= Ender Lilies: Quietus of the Knights =

2021 platform-adventure video game

- Developers: Adglobe; Live Wire
- Publisher: Binary Haze Interactive
- Director: Keisuke Okabe
- Programmers: Amir Gouini; Aoi Saito
- Composer: Mili
- Engine: Unreal Engine 4
- Platforms: Microsoft Windows; Nintendo Switch; Xbox One; Xbox Series X/S; PlayStation 4; PlayStation 5
- Release: Nintendo Switch, Windows; June 22, 2021; Xbox One, Xbox Series X/S; June 29, 2021; PlayStation 4; July 20, 2021; PlayStation 5; TBA
- Genres: Platform-adventure, action role-playing
- Mode: Single-player

Ender Lilies: Quietus of the Knights (Note: Japanese: エンダーリリーズ: クワイタス オブ ザ ナイツ, Hepburn: Endā Rirīzu: Kuwaitasu obu za Naitsu; stylized as ENDER LILIES: Quietus of the Knights) is a 2021 action role-playing platform game developed by Adglobe and Live Wire and published by Binary Haze Interactive, featuring a dark fantasy fairy tale.

The story follows Lily, the last surviving priestess in a land devastated by an endless and oppressive rain (named rain of death) that drives living things demented and transforms them into undead while granting immortality, also known as blighted. Awakening in a church with no recollection of recent events, Lily turns to exploring beyond the safety of the sanctuary to find the source of the rain. Along the way, Lily can summon the spirits of purified undead to protect her.

The title debuted on Steam Early Access on January 21, 2021, and was subsequently released on June 22, 2021, for Windows through Steam and Nintendo Switch. Other console launches followed on June 29, with Xbox One and Xbox Series X and Series S releases, and later with PlayStation 4 release on July 20. It received positive reviews from critics.

On March 25, 2024, the sequel Ender Magnolia: Bloom in the Mist was released in early access, later being fully released on January 22, 2025.

== Plot ==
Ender Lilies: Quietus of the Knights begins after the Blight has destroyed the entire kingdom of Land's End and turned all of its inhabitants into the Blighted. The protagonist and player character is Lily, the last surviving descendant of the White Priestesses, who has the ability to cleanse spirits of corruption. Lily is accompanied on her journey by the souls of spirits who have been purified of the Blight.

She is welcomed by the spirit of the Umbral Knight, who had sworn allegiance to an ancient White Priestess named Nymphilia (Priestess of the Dawn), who managed to bind the spirit of the faithful knight to Lily for her protection as she is quite young and defenseless. The knight will help navigate through the scourge kingdom, to find the way and recollect memories together, and, above all, to fight for the young priestess.

Lily and the Umbral Knight set off to find the current White Priestess, Fretia. Along the way, they encounter, defeat, and purify the Guardians who had sworn to protect Fretia. Lily can also learn of the past of Land's End through recovered memories and notes. In ancient times, the original founders of Land's End arrived on the continent and exterminated the native civilization, the Ancients, in a short but bloody war. Afterwards, the first king of Land's End learned of the existence of the Blight and the Ancients' experiments with it. Meanwhile, Ferin agreed to an immortality pact with Nymphilia (Priestess of the Dawn) when asked to do so by Eldred's guardian (another warrior and Ferin's friend who was the guardian of Nymphilia's mother, Eldred). However, due to the incomplete nature of the ritual, the Umbral Knight fell into a deep slumber, and the White Priestess was found by the king and employed to help purify the Blight, with subsequent White Priestesses continuing the role.

Many years later, the current king's obsession with researching the Blight to unlock the secrets of immortality, and a Blighted incursion led by the Blighted Lord, pushed the kingdom to the brink. Fretia managed to purify the Blighted Lord, but her body was overwhelmed and she was rendered paralyzed and powerless. As the Blight continued to encroach upon Land's End, the kingdom's researchers resorted to creating eight clones of Fretia to absorb the Blight collected in her body. Unwilling to sacrifice the clones who she viewed as her own daughters, Fretia sabotaged the ritual. While the clones were saved, the failed ritual caused the Rain of Death to begin to fall, immediately spreading the Blight across all of Land's End. The eight clones were split up among the remaining Guardians while a ninth clone was created as a last resort. Lily is the ninth clone, and due to sharing the bloodline of the White Priestesses, the Umbral Knight was summoned to her side when she awakened. However, the other eight clones died when their Guardians eventually fell to madness.

Eventually, after defeating Guardian Silva, Lily is approached by Fretia's spirit, who instructs Lily to meet her at the Fount at the edge of Land's End. From here, three endings are possible.

- If Lily heads to the Fount as instructed, Fretia's spirit purifies Lily and instructs her to leave Land's End behind and live her own life rather than inherit her burden. The Umbral Knight, unable to leave the borders of Land's End due to his pact, bids Lily farewell as he leaves to find Fretia's body.
- If Lily does not heed Fretia's advice and instead heads into the Verboten Domain, she meets Fretia in person, who transforms into the Blighted Lord. After defeating the Blighted Lord, Lily sacrifices herself to help Fretia contain the monster.
- If Lily instead decides to craft the Aegis Curio and equip it before defeating the Blighted Lord, the spirits of the clones combined with the Aegis Curio give Lily the power she needs to fully purify the Blighted Lord and put Fretia to rest. The Rain of Death finally stops, dispelling the Blight and giving Land's End a chance to recover, while Fretia's spirit assures Lily that she, the Umbral Knight, and the souls of the Guardians will continue to watch over her.

== Gameplay ==
Ender Lilies uses 2-dimensional side-scrolling gameplay. The player assumes control of Lily from a third-person perspective. The title is heavy on combat, puzzle-solving, and item collecting in a lost kingdom which the player must explore and uncover the mystery of as the game progresses.

Rather than wielding weaponry herself, Lily purifies the spirits of deceased knights, whose grateful souls join her in her quest, doing the fighting for her. The player starts with the spirit of a swordsman, who can unleash swift sword slashes around a small field, both above and below her. Defeating enemies will gain the player experience points. Special opponents can broaden the player's repertoire by discovering and defeating them, granting new abilities on the basis of their chosen offensive. The combat has the player equipping three different spirits, each of which is unique in their ability. The player can be equipped with two different loadouts and can switch seamlessly between them. Skills are not unlimited, however, and when they run out the player either needs to find a red flower or a place to rest. Players can synergize their skills with the relics that they find scattered over the world. To equip more relics, players will need to find Chains of Sorcery. There are multiple other upgrades that players might find scattered throughout the world, but blights are needed to enhance their skills, which will make them stronger and more potent. The main attack skill, helmed by the Umbral Knight, utilizes ancient souls, which are rare materials uncollectable in the alpha stage. Amulet fragments will increase maximum health points. The player can use the power of praying to restore their health, and can only pray three times before needing to rest. White flowers will restore one prayer. To upgrade the potency of Lily's prayers, players will need to find white priestesses.

There are also three different endings.

== Development ==
On September 10, 2020, Ender Lilies was revealed with a trailer during PAX Online 2020. The exhibitor behind the game, Binary Haze Interactive, was established in June 2020 by Hiroyuki Kobayashi. Keisuke Okabe will helm the story and game direction for this first entry of the studio's three upcoming titles.

On December 14, 2020, Binary Haze Interactive announced with a trailer that Ender Lilies: Quietus of the Knights will be arriving on Steam Early Access on January 21, 2021. Alongside the launch, the developers have stated that players can also participate in the development of the project through the Steam Discussions, and that they would be listening to the feedback from the community and implementing it into the final release in Summer 2021.

On April 14, 2021, during Nintendo's Indie World showcase, Binary Haze Interactive released a trailer announcing the full release of the game.

The developers considered stylizing the title as ENDER LILIES ~QUIETUS OF THE KNIGHTS~ before settling on ENDER LILIES: Quietus of the Knights, as all caps are very distinct in Japanese in the native character sets.

=== Release ===
Ender Lilies was originally scheduled for release in December 2020, three months after its announcement; however, the game was delayed to summer 2021.

The first build of the alpha version was released an Early Access on January 21, featuring three of the eight stages in addition to the alpha stages. The final version launched for Microsoft Windows through Steam and Nintendo Switch on June 22, 2021. It later released for Xbox One with Xbox Series X and Series S on June 29, 2021. A PlayStation 4 port of the game launched on July 20, 2021. The version 1.0 update offers new enemies, bosses and abilities, optimized gameplay balance, and character's maneuver and appearance. It also includes the five new areas to the game and complement the previous three, bringing the storyline to its conclusion.

The soundtrack will come to Spotify and Apple Music, iTunes and Amazon Music, and Steam as a DLC at a later date.

The developers have reportedly been tracking the number of people interested in physical editions of Ender Lilies; although bug fixes, balances, and community feature requests for the digital launch remain as their primary focus.

=== Music ===
The music from the game was composed and performed by Mili, a classical Japanese indie group consisting of Yamato Kasai, Cassie Wei, Yukihito Mitomo, Shoto Yoshida, and Ao Fujimori. The musical band has a host of anime credits including Ghost in the Shell and Goblin Slayer, as well as rhythm games such as Cytus and Deemo. Sound effects are provided by Keiichi Suigiyama, a former Sega producer with credits on franchises like Rez and Skies of Arcadia, completing the game's moving audio section.

== Reception ==
Reception

Aggregate score
Aggregator	Score
Metacritic	NS: 84/100; PC: 86/100; PS4: 86/100; XSX: 88/100

Review scores
Publication	Score
Nintendo Life	9/10
Nintendo World Report	8/10
RPGamer	3.5/5
RPGFan	89/100

=== Critical reception ===
Ender Lilies: Quietus of the Knights received "generally favorable reviews" according to review website Metacritic.

It was one of the top selling releases in January 2021 after launching in the second half of the month on Steam. The game gained praise regarding its art design and ambience, which is stated to bear resemblance to Salt and Sanctuary and titles by Vanillaware, as well as its fighting mechanics that appear to have been inspired by Hollow Knight and Monster Sanctuary. The orchestral, primarily piano-based soundtrack also garnered critical acclaim, with some stating they only listened to the music in the trailer and decided to purchase it. Kazuma Hashimoto of Siliconera declared Ender Lilies "has the potential to be an indie darling. All of the right elements are there, and they come together splendidly." Austin Suther of TechRaptor previewed Ender Lilies: Quietus of the Knights, and concluded it "seems like a very promising game."

=== Sales ===
As of March 2022, the game had sold a total of over 600,000 digital copies worldwide.

== Sequel ==
A sequel, Ender Magnolia: Bloom in the Mist, announced on February 21, 2024, was launched in Steam Early Access on March 25 of the same year. The full game was released on January 22, 2025, for Microsoft Windows, Nintendo Switch, PlayStation 4, PlayStation 5 and Xbox Series X/S.
