= Mili (band) =

Japanese indie music group

Background information
- Origin: Japan
- Genre: Indie
- Years active: 2012–present
- Label: Saihate Records
- Members: Cassie "Momocashew" Wei; Yamato "Hamo" Kasai; Yukihito Mitomo; Shoto Yoshida; Ao Fujimori
- Past members: Ame Yamaguchi
- Website: Official website

Mili is a Japanese indie music group founded in August 2012, consisting of Cassie Wei, Yamato Kasai, Yukihito Mitomo, Shoto Yoshida, and Ao Fujimori. Mili covers electronic classical, contemporary classical, and post-classical genres of music in Japanese, English, Chinese, and French. Apart from releasing their own songs, Mili has also contributed their music, lyrics, and/or songs to various media such as video games, commercial video, and for other artists. Mili is labeled under Saihate Records; as of October 2019 and announced in April 2020, they have separated from their music management company.

Three of their released CDs placed first in the Oricon Indies chart, and they appeared in Summer Sonic 2017 and 2018. The group is named after the Brothers Grimm fairy tale, "Dear Mili." The band has also released music under the name AWAAWA.

== Members ==
Mili consists of the following five members:

- Yamato Kasai (葛西大和) or HAMO – main composer, main arranger, secondary lyricist, and guitarist.
- Cassie Wei, or momocashew – lead vocalist and main lyricist. Born May 8, 1993, in Beijing, China, she was raised in Canada before relocating to Japan. Prior to co-founding Mili in 2012, she operated as an independent Vocaloid producer under the name momocashew, utilizing voicebanks such as OLIVER. She is married to fellow member Yamato Kasai. Following a public pregnancy announcement in November 2023, she gave birth to her first child in May 2024.
- Yukihito Mitomo (三友行人) – bassist. Joined Mili in December 2013.
- Shōto Yoshida (吉田翔人) – drummer. Joined Mili in December 2013.
- Ao Fujimori (藤森蒼) – illustrator and animator. Joined Mili in September 2014.

=== Former members ===
- Ame Yamaguchi (山口雨) – stylist, designer, and art director. Joined Mili in May 2014; left in August 2019 to work on personal projects.

== History and works ==
2012

- Founded (August)
- Contributed in Sound On Our Palms -TENORI-ON Compilation- (October 28)
- Songs for Cytus (November)
- Composed song for "Kaitai no Zōkei" (December)

2013

- Music for RICOH's commercial video (September 2)
- Music for Yamayuri (September 17)
- Song effect for "A lighthouse and a lilium auratum" and "A flower sings" (September 17)
- MuNiCa - Cry of Pluto was sent to Tokyo Game Show 2013 for display (September 27)
- Songs for Deemo (November 13)
- Arranged music for Sakevisual's otome game Backstage Pass (November 30)
- Arranged and composed song for voice comic "Gomen ne" (December 13)

2014

- Registered to ARTISTCROWD (January 8)
- Song for "Ye Hu Ba Zhong Zou+" (March 8)
- Music for Toto's Washlet commercial video (June)
- Music for Fuji Kyuko's La ville de Gaspard et Lisa (June 26)
- Song arrangement for Ferri's 2nd album "∞": "rusty chandelier" and "eternal return" (November 5)

2015

- Music for Combi's commercial video "Branding Movie" (January)
- Arrangement for DAOKO's 1st album "DAOKO": "Nai Mono Nedari" (March 25)
- Arrangement & composition for Astell & Kern's AK100II Kana Hanazawa Edition collaboration song, "Tadoritsuku Basho" (August)

2016

- Song for anime Bloodivores, "NENTEN" (October)
- Live tour (November 5–12)

2017

- Mini live "15158775" (イチゴ壱号バナナ七号, Ichigo Ichi Gō Banana Nana Gō) (May 27, June 11, & June 24)
- Performing at Summer Sonic 2017 (August 18)
- 5th anniversary live tour "Mag Milk All Songs" (September 30, October 1, October 9, & November 11)

2018

- Live Tour 2018 "Mommy, Where's My Left Hand Again?" at Osaka (May 19), Nagoya (May 20), Taipei, Taiwan (June 9), Tokyo (June 15), Guangzhou (November 8), Beijing(November 10) and Shanghai (November 11)
- Song for television anime series Goblin Slayer, "Rightfully" (October)
- Song for television anime series Merc Storia: The Apathetic Boy and the Girl in a Bottle "Origin" and arrangement & composition for its ending theme sung by Inori Minase, "Bottleship" (October)
- Performed at C3AFA 2018 Singapore (December 2)

2019

- 双島乳業 presents Mili 1st Live 2019 "Mother Ship Gi6pon" (February 3)
- Music in charge for Fuji TV's original drama Yuri Dano Kan Dano (May)
- New song, "Sloth" (September)
- Guest artist at Anime Festival Asia: I LOVE ANISONG Matsuri Malaysia 2019 (June 8, 9)
- Mili Tour 2019-2020: AJIWAIIAJI (December 2019–January 2020)

2020

- Song for anime film Goblin Slayer: Goblin's Crown, "Static" (February)
- Song for the animated webseries Ghost in the Shell: SAC 2045, "sustain++" (February)
- Song for mobile game Promise of Wizard, "Cast Me a Spell" (April)
- Song for television anime series Gleipnir, "Rain, body fluids and smell" (April)
- Original soundtrack for video game ENDER LILIES: Quietus of the Knights (September)

2021

- Album for video game Library of Ruina, "To Kill a Living Book -for Library of Ruina-" (October)
- Song for the video game Limbus Company, "In Hell We Live, Lament", in collaboration with Kihow of Myth & Roid (November)

2022

- Song for video game DEEMO II, "Bento Box Bivouac" (January)
- Song for the video game Welcome to Dreamland, "Sideshow Duckling" (February)
- Opening theme for the video game Thy Creature, "My Creator" (February)
- Song for the second part of mobile game Promise of Wizard, "Skin-Deep Comedy" (March)
- Opening theme for the anime adaptation of The Executioner and Her Way of Life, "Paper Bouquet" (April)
- Ending theme for the anime adaption of Vermeil in Gold, "Mortal With You" (July)
- Theme for the Mystery Novel NOIR DOLL, "Dancing Ghost's Ball Jointed Darling" (December)

2023

- Boss theme for Canto III of video game Limbus Company, "Between Two Worlds" (March)
- Song for video game DEEMO II, "Gunners in the Rain" (May)
- Boss theme for Canto IV of video game Limbus Company, "Fly, My Wings" (June)
- Performed at Anime Expo 2023 (July 2)
- Preinstalled song for Sony Xperia 5 V, "Sleep Talk Metropolis" (September)
- Song for the second season of television anime series Goblin Slayer, "Entertainment" (October 31)
- Boss fight theme for Canto V of video game Limbus Company, "Compass" (November)

2024

- Song for video game Goblin Slayer Another Adventure: Nightmare Feast, "Duetting Solo" (February 29)
- Original Soundtrack for video game Ender Magnolia: Bloom in the Mist (March 25)
- Boss fight theme for Canto VI of video game Limbus Company, "Through Patches of Violet" (April)
- Promotional theme for video game Arknights, "Grown-up's Paradise" (April 26)
- OST for video game Snowbreak: Containment Zone (May)
- Boss fight theme for Canto VII of video game Limbus Company, "Hero" (October)
- Image Song for Promise of Wizard, "Life We Sow" (November)

2025

- Song for the video game Limbus Company, "Tian Tian" (stylized as TIAN TIAN) for Canto VIII (June 1)
- Song for the video game Osu! "Peach Pit and Cyanide" (November 24th)

2026

- Song for the video game Limbus Company, "SAIKAI" for Canto IX (January 16th)
- Song for the video game Arknights, "TIE HUA FEI" (February)
- Song for the video game "Hell Maiden", "Not My Paradiso" (July 15th)
- Song for the video game Limbus Company, "Rendezvous" for Canto X (October 4th)

== Honours ==
In 2025, scientists named a fossil barklouse †Psyllipsocus mili. The species is from the Cretaceous and its name was given in honor to the band's "incredible music and art".

== Discography ==
=== Albums ===
==== Studio albums ====
Title	Album details	Track listing	Peak chart positions	
Title	Album details	Track listing	JPN Oricon	JPN Billboard
Mag Mell	Released: September 17, 2014; Label: Saihate Records; Formats: CD, digital download	13 tracks: 1. A Turtle's Heart; 2. Nine Point Eight; 3. Utopiosphere; 4. Friction; 5. Chocological; 6. YUBIKIRI-GENMAN; 7. Sacramentum: Unaccompanied Hymn for Torino; 8. Ephemeral; 9. Imagined Flight; 10. Fable; 11. Rosetta; 12. Maroma Samsa; 13. Witch's Invitation	31	21
Miracle Milk	Released: October 12, 2016; Label: Saihate Records; Formats: CD, Vinyl, digital download	19 tracks: 1. Red Dahlia; 2. Ga1ahad and Scientific Witchery; 3. RTRT; 4. Unidentified Flavourful Object; 5. Meatball Submarine; 6. Vulnerability; 7. Nenten (与我共鳴-NENTEN-); 8. Bathtub Mermaid; 9. Cerebrite; 10. Space Colony; 11. world.execute(me); 12. Utopiosphere -Platonism-; 13. Painful Death for the Lactose Intolerant; 14. Yubikiri-Genman -special edit-; 15. Sl0t; 16. Past the Stargazing Season; 17. Colorful; 18. Komm, süsser Tod (cover of movie The End of Evangelion's insert song); 19. Shitty Flowers (hidden track)	12	9
Millennium Mother	Released: April 24, 2018; Label: Saihate Records; Formats: CD, digital download	20 tracks: 1. Boys in Kaleidosphere; 2. Camelia; 3. Summoning 101; 4. Vitamins feat. World's End Girlfriend; 5. Lemonade; 6. Milk (奶水); 7. world.search(you); 8. Mushrooms; 9. Gertrauda; 10. Tokyo Neon; 11. Extension of You; 12. Mirror Mirror; 13. With a Billion Worldful of <3 feat. DÉ DÉ Mouse; 14. Every Other Ghost; 15. Fossil; 16. Rubber Human; 17. Excαlibur; 18. Let the Maggots Sing; 19. Nine Point Eight -special edit-; 20. Still Alive (cover of Portal's ending theme)	17	12

==== Mini albums ====
Title	Album details	Track listing	Peak chart positions	
Title	Album details	Track listing	JPN Oricon	JPN Billboard
Hue	Released: May 24, 2017; Label: Saihate Records; Formats: CD, digital download	6 tracks: 1. Rubber Human; 2. world.search(you); 3. DK; 4. Ikutoshitsuki (幾年月); 5. Opium; 6. Excαlibur	25	21
To Kill a Living Book -for Library Of Ruina-	Release: October 9, 2021; Label: Saihate Records; Format: CD, Cassette, Vinyl, digital download; Soundtrack from the video game Library of Ruina	8 tracks: 1. String Theocracy; 2. From a Place of Love; 3. And Then is Heard No More; 4. Iron Lotus; 5. Children of the City; 6. Gone Angels; 7. Poems of a Machine; 8. Salt, Pepper, Birds, and the Thought Police	-	-
Let's Lament	Released: Jan 21, 2024; Label: Saihate Records; Format: Digital download, Vinyl; Piano remixes of music from Limbus Company	2 tracks: 1. In Hell We Live, Lament (Let's Lament); 2. Between Two Worlds (Let's Lament)	-	-

=== Single ===
Title	Year	Track listing	Peak positions	Album
Title	Year	Track listing	JPN Oricon	Album
"Rightfully"	2018	5 tracks: 1. Rightfully (opening theme for television anime Goblin Slayer); 2. Mob Mentality; 3. Region; 4. Though Our Paths May Diverge; 5. Rightfully (instrumental)	24	Non-album single
"Intrauterine Education"	2020	6 tracks: 1. sustain++; (ending song for television anime Ghost in the Shell: SAC_2045); 2. Petrolea; 3. War of Shame; 4. sustain++; (instrumental); 5. Petrolea (instrumental); 6. War of Shame (instrumental)	30	Non-album single
"Ame to Taieki to Nioi/Static" (雨と体液と匂い/Static)	2020	4 tracks: 1. Ame to Taieki to Nioi (ending song for television anime Gleipnir); 2. Static(ending song for anime movie Goblin Slayer: Goblin's Crown); 3. Ame to Taieki to Nioi (instrumental); 4. Static (instrumental)	28	Non-album single

=== Others ===
Title	Release date	Notes	Track Listing	Source
"Chocological"	October 28, 2012	Included in compilation album Music on Our Palms	1 track: 1. Chocological	
MuNiCa – Cry of Pluto [Original Soundtrack]	April 7, 2013	Soundtrack for the video game MuNiCa - Cry of Pluto	8 tracks: 1. Main Theme; 2. A Wonderful Tale; 3. The Cathedral Which Burns; 4. In Imperial Cathedral; 5. Unexpected; 6. Madism; 7. Main Theme (Piano Version); 8. Outro	
H△G×Mili	November 27, 2013	Split album with H△G	4 tracks: 1. Witch's Invitation; 2. Sacramentum:Unaccompanied Hymn for Torino; 3. Nine Point Eight; 4. 星見る頃を過ぎても -Canon and Gigue in Plectrum Remix-	
"Klavier"	March 8, 2014	Piano album by Yamato Kasai	5 tracks: 1. A Flower Sings; 2. 999; 3. L.O.V.; 4. Flashback; 5. Ephemeral	
"Holy and Darkness 1"	December 22, 2014	Collaboration with Tasuku Arai	1 track: 1. Holy and Darkness 1	
H△G×Mili vol.2	May 9, 2015	Split album with H△G	4 tracks: 1. Cerebrite; 2. Space Colony; 3. Inhibition; 4. Colorful	
ENDER LILIES:Quietus of the Knights Original Soundtrack	June 22, 2021	Original soundtrack for Binary Haze Interactive's Ender Lilies: Quietus of the Knights	50 tracks	
Key Ingredient	June 2, 2022	Piano Cover album of previously released songs, instrumental version also released	13 tracks: 1. A Turtle's Heart; 2. world.execute(me); 3. Iron Lotus; 4. RTRT; 5. TOKYO NEON; 6. Rubber Human; 7. Birthday Kid; 8. String Theocracy; 9. Ga1ahad and Scientific Witchery; 10. Lemonade; 11. Summoning 101; 12. From a Place of Love; 13. Chocological	
