= Sdorica =

2018 role-playing video game

- Developers: Rayark
- Publisher: Rayark
- Platforms: iOS; Android
- Release: April 19, 2018

Sdorica is a 2018 gacha and tile-matching role-playing video game developed and published by Rayark. It was released on the iOS and Android platforms as a free-to-play game, supporting English, Japanese, and Chinese languages. The game underwent lengthy development and soft launch periods before being formally released in April 2018.

== Gameplay ==
Characters are divided into three classes: support, attack, and defense. Each character has three corresponding skills or attacks, relating to the number of orbs matched in the bottom of the screen. Players build teams of three characters, one of each class. Depending on what content is played, characters may be locked rather than freely chosen for challenges or storylines. There are two slots in the team for advisors, which provide passive or active abilities that affect the entire team.

Two rows of orbs corresponding to class colors (white, purple, and yellow for support, attack, and defense, respectively), fill the bottom of the screen with advisor abilities along the sides. The combat is turn-based, with enemies having a number above their head representing the amount of actions before their attack.

The game is played through a single-player campaign; however, players are able to join guilds with other players that allow for messaging, donations, in-game markets, and guild-specific rewards and challenges.

The game is progressed through chapter stages, with each stage having three waves of enemies or one final boss to defeat, with interluding dialogue.

== Plot ==
Sdorica is set in the fictional continent of Vendacti where players act as Watchers, or keepers of history. It initially follows the story of Angelia, the princess of the Sun Kingdom, as she prepares to take the throne from her late father. She is joined by Naya, a security officer, Pang, a traveler from the East Alliance, and Tica, a Rune Academy student. After meeting with Chieftain Crushfang and Dagger, two bears ruling nearby caves, Angelia is kidnapped and rescued by Naya and another officer, Sione, and goes into hiding in the Slums. Tica meets a girl named Leah while on a mission for the Rune Academy and they work together to find a magical seed. In the Slums, Angelia and Naya meet and Nigel and Hyacinth, as well as Lio, Leah's twin brother. They fight off void monsters, where Hyacinth is bitten and dies of her wounds. After receiving intelligence from Yamatsuki, a friend of Nigel, he finds out Angelia's real identity as the princess and confronts her over the current king, Theodore and his plans to make a flying castle, and they plan to head to the desert. Dagger meets Roger, Kittyeyes, and Nolva, and they head to a doctor to treat the void disease that Roger has. Aosta, the doctor, is able to treat Roger, and they stay in a nearby village. Pang enters Maple Lake and meets Yan-Bo, who he asks to train with. Yan-Bo declines, and Pang confronts his past indecisions by stopping Hestia and Karnulla from killing each other.

== Development and release ==
In the initial release of Sdorica, ten people had worked on the scripting of both main and side storylines. Continuous updates expanded both gameplay mechanics and the main storyline, with there being three seasons released as of September 2020.

The game was teased in December 2015 and released a soft launch in September 2017. It was formally released on April 19, 2018, with a pre-registration campaign offering in-game bonuses.

== Reception ==
Harry Slater of Pocket Gamer described Sdorica as a complex "match-stuff RPG" and praised the amount of strategy involved, giving the initial release a 4/5. At the same time, he found the tutorials to come with a steep learning curve and commented on the possibility of turning away more casual players. Arjun Sha of Beebom found the game to be similar to Genshin Impact in regards to the depth of story, complexity of gameplay, and character amounts. He found it to be less "graphically rich" than similar gacha games and RPGs, but still interesting and engaging. Christine Chan from App Advice gave the game an overall rating of 9.8/10, highly recommending the game to others. She found the UI to be crowded and sometimes slow, but thought that the soundtrack and voice acting was immersive and matched the theme of Sdorica. Waverly from Paste highlighted the storytelling of the game, praising the presence of both emotional narrative and themes. They did not offer commentary on gameplay, stating "I don't really care much for the gameplay of Sdorica".

Sdorica has been featured in multiple cross-game events with other Rayark games. Music from Sdorica was added to Cytus II and in-game events in Sdorica have included crossovers with Deemo and Mandora.
