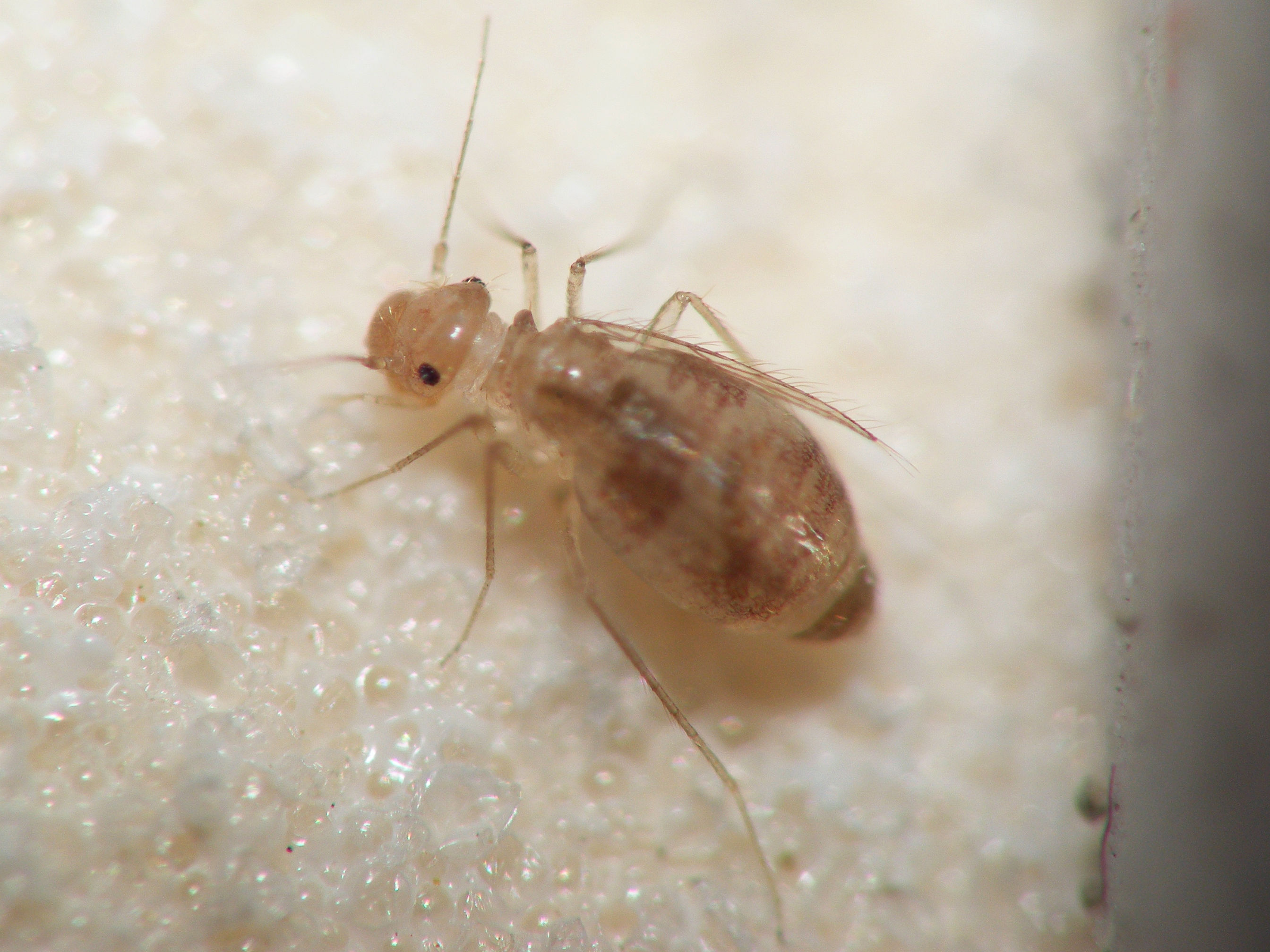

Scientific classification
- Domain: Eukaryota
- Kingdom: Animalia
- Phylum: Arthropoda
- Class: Insecta
- Order: Psocodea
- Family: Psyllipsocidae
- Genus: Dorypteryx
- Species: D. domestica

Binomial name
- Dorypteryx domestica (Smithers, 1958)

= Dorypteryx domestica =

Species of booklouse

Dorypteryx domestica is a species of cave barklouse in the family Psyllipsocidae. It is found in Africa, Europe and Northern Asia (excluding China), and North America.

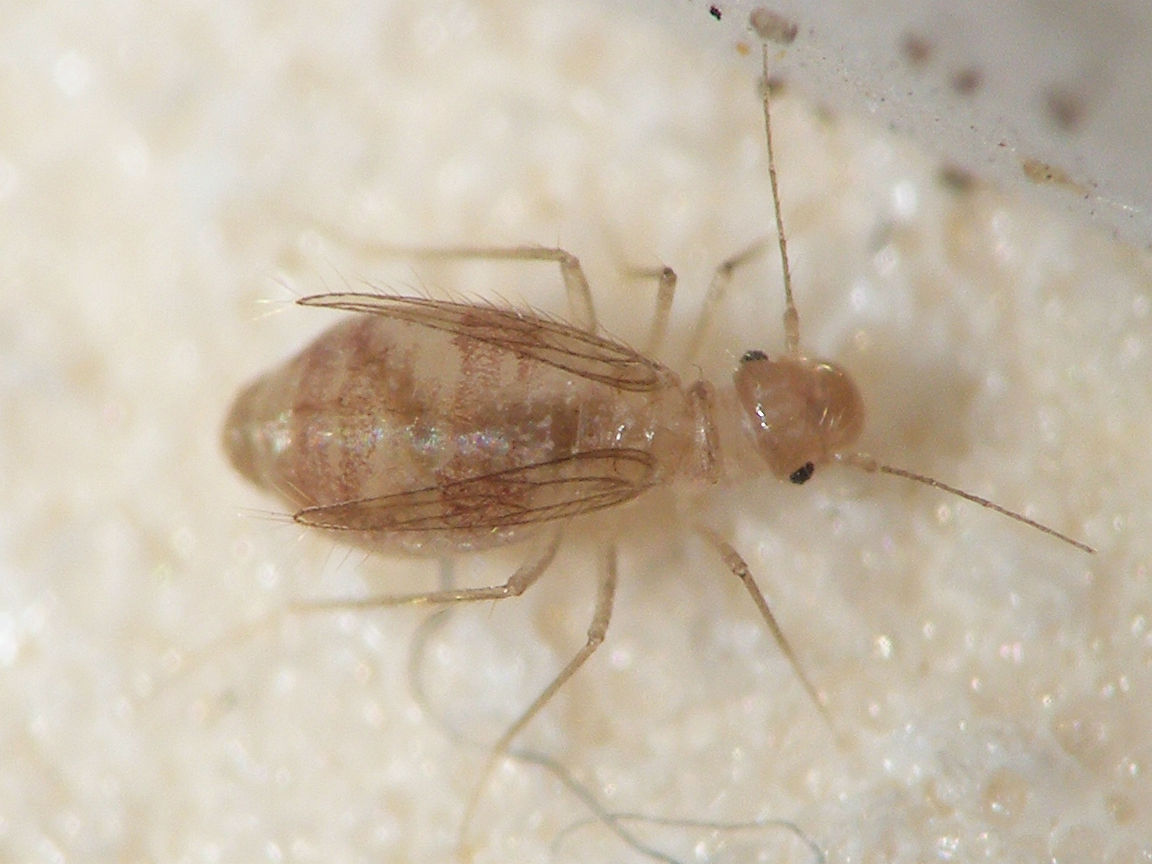
