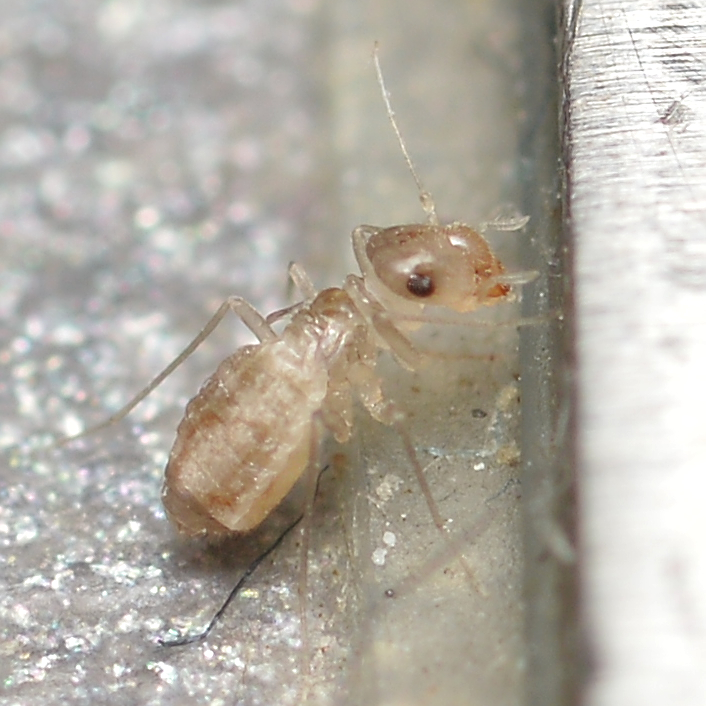

Scientific classification
- Domain: Eukaryota
- Kingdom: Animalia
- Phylum: Arthropoda
- Class: Insecta
- Order: Psocodea
- Family: Psyllipsocidae
- Genus: Psyllipsocus
- Species: P. ramburii

Binomial name
- Psyllipsocus ramburii Selys-Longchamps, 1872

= Psyllipsocus ramburii =

Species of booklouse

Psyllipsocus ramburii is a species of cave barklouse in the family Psyllipsocidae. It is found in Africa, Australia, the Caribbean, Europe, Northern Asia (excluding China), Central America, North America, Oceania, South America, and Southern Asia.
