= Ender Magnolia: Bloom in the Mist =

- Cover art featuring Nola (left) and Lilac (right)
- Developers: Adglobe; Live Wire
- Publisher: Binary Haze Interactive
- Composer: Mili
- Engine: Unreal Engine 5
- Platforms: Microsoft Windows; Nintendo Switch; Xbox One; Xbox Series X/S; PlayStation 4; PlayStation 5
- Release: January 22, 2025
- Genre: Metroidvania
- Mode: Single-player

Ender Magnolia: Bloom in the Mist is a 2025 Metroidvania video game developed by Adglobe and Live Wire and published by Binary Haze Interactive. It was released in early access for Microsoft Windows on March 25, 2024. Ender Magnolia is a sequel to the developers' previous game Ender Lilies: Quietus of the Knights, set in the same world. In Ender Magnolia the protagonist Lilac goes on a quest to purify the corrupted Homunculi that have overrun the kingdom.

== Plot ==
Ender Magnolia takes place decades after its predecessor Ender Lilies in the same world. The game is set in the Land of Fumes, where "machine-like artificial life forms" called Homunculi are built to serve the kingdom. These Homunculi have become corrupted from an underground toxic gas, causing them to become violent and insane. The protagonist Lilac is an “Attuner” with the ability to purify corrupted Homunculi. Lilac teams up with a Homunculi named Nola and sets out to rescue the kingdom.

Waking up in an abandoned lab with no memories of her past life, Lilac manages to escape with the help of Homunculi Nola using her Attuner powers. Nola has damaged memories as well, and decides to accompany Lilac. Upon reaching the surface, Nola explains they must reach the center of the Land of Fumes, the Upper Stratum where the nation's ruling class resides and may hold the answers that they are seeking. However, strange "Fumes" that rise from the ground have started spreading Blight and caused Homunculi to lose their sanity and transform into hostile Mutants, forcing Lilac to rely on her Homunculi companions for protection as they journey through the Lower Stratum. Along the way, they recruit additional Homunculi in their party before encountering Chief Attuner Joran, who upon hearing Lilac's story that she was rescued by a white haired woman, guesses that she is referring to the Attuner Lilia. As Joran attempts to fix the lift that will transport them to the Central Stratum, Lilac learns that Lilia and Nola found her as an infant in the mythical Land of Origin hidden beneath the Lower Stratum, and decided to raise her in secret. Lilac helps repair the lift, and in return Joran tells her everything he knows about Lilia. She was a skilled Attuner who, despite being in line to be the head of House Frost, decided to stay behind in the Lower Stratum to help the Homunculi, but has gone missing.

Lilac takes the lift up to the Central Stratum, where she finds that all of the Attuners there have been slaughtered by the nation's administrator, Gilroy, who has become a Mutant. Nola recognizes Gilroy as the Homunculi that stranded her in the Lower Stratum, but Gilroy manages to retreat after he is heavily damaged. As Lilac explores the Central Stratum and recruits more Homunculi, she finds that even the Central Stratum is not safe from the spreading Blight. She heads to an automated factory that continues to mass produce Mutants to shut it down, but while there also finds a lab where she and Lilia participated in several experiments. There, she encounters Gilroy again, who proclaims his purpose is to maintain the barrier above the city to prevent the Rain of Death from falling on it, and fears Lilac due to her immunity to the Rain since she is a descendant of the Ancients, which gives House Frost an advantage. Nola then accuses Gilroy of betraying House Milius, with Gilroy retorting that Nola is the traitor, having been assigned to spy on House Frost but abandoning her mission. Gilroy then retreats, telling Lilac and Nola to find him in the Upper Stratum.

If Lilac decides to proceed directly to the Upper Stratum to confront Gilroy, she learns that the structure that generates the barrier, the Empyrean Parasol, is in fact drawing energy directly from the Land of Origin to power the barrier, and that only specialized Homunculi like Gilroy can maintain its operations. With no other way to stop the barrier from deteriorating, Lilac and Nola challenge Gilroy and defeat him, with Nola remembering that she was also specifically built to manage the barrier. Gilroy reveals he took on the role to protect Nola, as maintaining the barrier causes excruciating pain and suffering. Regardless, Nola takes control of the barrier, and bids farewell to Lilac. However, even when the barrier is restored, it does not stop the spread of the Blight through the Fumes.

Instead of confronting Gilroy straight away, Lilac also has the option to continue to investigate Lilia's whereabouts. She learns that the head of House Frost, Abelia, attempted to transfer her soul into Lilia, but Joran sabotaged the process, taking Abelia's soul into his own body instead to save Lilia. Joran then orders his own Homunculus to kill him to eliminate Abelia for good. Lilac also receives help from a foreign Ancient priestess (implied to be the protagonist from Ender Lilies), who unseals the location in the Land of Origin Lilia is hidden in and helps craft a new Aegis Curio for Lilac to purify the Blight from Lilia. Lilac and Nola successfully purge the Blight from Lilia, and Nola remembers that her true name is Magnolia and that she was Lilia's Homunculus. Lilia explains that while both Gilroy and Magnolia have the power to maintain the barrier, Magnolia also has the power to destroy it. In addition, Gilroy's suffering and anguish is actually corrupting the Land of Origin, spreading the Blight from below and creating the Fumes. She insists that Nola destroy the barrier so they can harness the resulting energy to dispel both the Rain of Death and Blight, though this would also mean the disappearance of magic, which is sustaining both Lilia and the Homunculi. Lilia accepts her inevitable death, while Nola muses that it would finally give immortal Homunculi finite lifespans like humans. After defeating Gilroy, Lilac, Nola, and Lilia go through with their plan to destroy the barrier, purifying the Land of Fumes. With the Rain of Death and Blight gone, Lilac and Nola resolve to live their lives to the fullest with what time they have left.

== Gameplay ==
Ender Magnolia: Bloom in the Mist is a 2D side-scrolling Metroidvania. The player controls Lilac, who traverses the game world doing a mixture of platforming, exploration, and combat. As the player progresses through the game, they collect upgrades and new abilities which enables them to access new parts of the game world. Similar to Lily in the game's predecessor Ender Lilies, Lilac does not engage in combat directly, and instead summons Homunculi companions to fight in battle. When Lilac defeats corrupted Homunculi in battle, some of them can be purified and turned into summonable allies.

== Development ==
Ender Magnolia: Bloom in the Mist was announced for Nintendo Switch with a trailer on February 21, 2024 during a Nintendo Direct: Partner Showcase. It was later also confirmed for release on Microsoft Windows, Xbox Series X/S, PlayStation 4, and PlayStation 5.

=== Release ===
Ender Magnolia: Bloom in the Mist was released in early access on Steam on March 25, 2024. The full game was released on January 22, 2025.

A physical release was announced on June 24, 2025 by Limited Run Games for Nintendo Switch and PlayStation 5 in both standard and collector's edition.

== Reception ==
Reception

Aggregate scores
Aggregator	Score
Metacritic	NS: 85/100; PC: 84/100; PS5: 83/100
OpenCritic	94% recommend (Note: Based on 68 reviews)

Review scores
Publication	Score
Eurogamer	4/5
Famitsu	33/40
Game Informer	8.25/10
Hardcore Gamer	4.5/5
Nintendo Life	9/10
Push Square	8/10

Ender Magnolia: Bloom in the Mist received generally favorable reviews from critics, according to the review aggregation website Metacritic. Fellow review aggregator OpenCritic assessed that the game received "mighty" approval, being recommended by 94% of critics.

=== Early Access ===
Reviewing the early access version on PC, Ryan Radcliff from RPGamer commented, "Ender Magnolia feels like it will be a strong follow-up, and fans that want to enjoy challenging battles with tons of variety, along with fun rewards for exploration, should definitely mark this game on their wishlists." Chris Shive of Hardcore Gamer also had favorable impressions of the early access version, citing quality of life improvements over the previous game. Game Informer's Marcus Stewart praised the game's art direction and combat, while commenting that the lore was "interesting."

=== Post Release ===
Comparing Ender Magnolia to its predecessor Ender Lilies, Chris Shive from Hardcore Gamer stated that "Ender Magnolia: Bloom in the Mist recreates the overall vibe of its predecessor while generally improving the experience." Likewise Push Square's Liam Croft said the game was "elevating their addictive blend of combat, exploration, and platforming to new heights." Meanwhile Katharine Castle from Eurogamer preferred the previous game, commenting, "Is it a better game than Ender Lilies? In some respects, I still think the original just about edges this one out in terms of variety and visual spectacle." In Japan, four critics from Famitsu gave the game a total score of 33 out of 40.
