= Pseudorypteryx =

Scientific classification
- Domain: Eukaryota
- Kingdom: Animalia
- Phylum: Arthropoda
- Class: Insecta
- Order: Psocodea
- Family: Psyllipsocidae
- Genus: Pseudorypteryx; Garcia Aldrete, 1984
- Species: P. mexicana

Binomial name
- Pseudorypteryx mexicana Garcia Aldrete, 1984

Genus of booklice

Pseudorypteryx is a genus of cave barklice in the family Psyllipsocidae. There is one described species in Pseudorypteryx, P. mexicana.
