= Promise of Wizard =

2019 Japanese video game

魔法使いの約束 (Mahōtsukai no Yakusoku)
- Video game
- Developer: Coly
- Publisher: Coly
- Directed by: Kazumako (Worldview supervision)
- Designed by: Dangmill
- Genre: Simulation game
- Platform: Android, iOS
- Released: JP: November 26, 2019
- Manga
- Written by: Bunta Tsushimi; Coly
- Illustrated by: Uta Shinonome
- Published by: Ichijinsha
- Magazine: Monthly Comic Zero Sum
- Original run: April 28, 2020 – December 27, 2023
- Volumes: 3
- Manga

Promise of Wizard Comic
- Written by: Bunta Tsushimi; Coly
- Illustrated by: Shibatarō Nakamura
- Published by: Ichijinsha
- Magazine: Monthly Comic Zero Sum
- Original run: April 26, 2024 – present
- Volumes: 1
- Anime television series
- Directed by: Naoyuki Tatsuwa
- Produced by: Kiriko Horie; Fumi Teranishi; Hiromi Inoue; Jitsurou Kikuchi; Kyouhei Nishikawa; Hiroshi Kamei; Soujirou Arimizu; Reiko Sugimoto; Yuriko Nakano; Shintarou Abe
- Written by: Nanami Higuchi
- Music by: Shūji Katayama
- Studio: Liden Films
- Licensed by: Crunchyroll
- Original network: Tokyo MX, BS-TBS, MBS
- Original run: January 6, 2025 – March 24, 2025
- Episodes: 12

Promise of Wizard (魔法使いの約束, Mahōtsukai no Yakusoku) is a Japanese online simulation video game created by Coly. It was released for Android and iOS devices in November 2019 in Japan.

A manga adaptation with art by Uta Shinonome was serialized in Ichijinsha' josei manga magazine Monthly Comic Zero Sum from April 2020 to December 2023 and was collected in three tankōbon volumes. A second manga adaptation with art by Shibatarō Nakamura has been serialized in the same magazine since April 2024. The game also received various stage play and radio web drama adaptations. An anime television series adaptation produced by Liden Films aired from January to March 2025.

== Plot ==
Promise of Wizard revolves around the Sage (whose name and gender can be changed by the player), a human from modern-day Japan who has been summoned into a world where wizards and magic are real by a group of wizards known as the Sage's Wizards. The Sage's Wizards have been summoned by previous Sage's and must join the fight against the Great Calamity, the name for their moon, which descends once a year, causing havoc with the strength of its magic. The Sage's Wizards prior to the player character have lived apart from one another, only convening when it is time to fight the Great Calamity. At the start of the story, they have faced an unprecedented tragedy where half of their number died in the battle and must rely upon the new Sage (and the mysterious powers only the Sage has) for help in next year's battle.

There are multiple formats of stories used in game, including event stories, main stories, anniversary stories and card stories.The event stories focus on the Sage and a selection of the twenty-one Sage's Wizards as they train, negate the damage from the Great Calamity through missions, and deepen their bonds with each other.

=== Main Story One ===
Promise of Wizard begins with the player character being summoned into the world of wizards as the battle against the Great Calamity has finished. They are greeted by soldiers of Central Kingdom as well as the Minister of Magical Affairs, Drummond, and the secretary of Central Kingdom, Cock Robin. They attempt to persuade the Sage into joining them in order to bring the Sage's Wizards under Central's control but fail when two of the wizards (former Central knight Cain and Eastern noble Heathcliff) appear and ask the Sage to trust them. Cain explains how the Great Calamity was stronger this year than it ever had been in the past.

The Sage is brought to the Magic Manor where one of the wizards, Heathcliff's mentor Faust, lays dying. Tapping into the power of the Sage, they are able to revive Faust before he turns to stone, the result of a wizard's magic crystallizing upon being dealt a death-blow. The next day, the Sage agrees to perform a ritual to summon wizards to replace those who were killed by the Great Calamity. The majority of the Sage's Wizards convene - with the exception of the strongest wizard in the world, Oz, and the three younger Northern wizards; Mithra, Owen and Bradley - and Cain proposes that they all live together at the Manor in order to better prepare themselves before the next battle.

Meanwhile, Central kingdom prepares to hold a parade to honor the Sage's Wizards for defending the world, though it is marred by the suspicion and prejudice held against the wizards, heightened by the fear of the strength of the Calamity. Strange events and rumors plague Central kingdom's capital, including reports of seeing someone in the graveyard at night. Upon investigation, the Sage's Wizards discover the cause of the Great Calamity's increased strength, as well as the mastermind behind it - a mysterious figure named Nova who has been using human remains in a ritual in order to summon the Calamity closer.

== Characters ==
Promise of Wizard features twenty-one wizards in the core cast, each belonging to one of the five countries of the world.

=== Protagonist ===
Akira Masaki (真木 晶, Masaki Akira)
Voiced by: Yumiri Hanamori

=== Central Wizards ===
Arthur Granvelle (アーサー・グランヴェル, Āsā Guranberu)
Voiced by: Atsushi Tamaru
Arthur Granvelle is the prince of Central kingdom. Abandoned as a child by his mother for being a wizard, he was found and taken in by Oz. He lived with Oz for many years. When his father fell ill, he returned to Central kingdom to resume his roles as crown prince. He was summoned by the player Sage.
Oz (オズ, Ozu)
Voiced by: Takashi Kondō
Formerly a Northern wizard, Oz is regarded as the strongest wizard in the world and is seen as the only one who can keep the Northern wizards in line. He was mentored by Snow and White, and once tried to conquer the world with Figaro. He was summoned by a previous Sage.
Cain Knightley (カイン・ナイトレイ, Kain Naitorei)
Voiced by: Daichi Kanbara
Cain Knightley is a former knight of Central kingdom. Hiding his status as a wizard from the world, he rose through the ranks to become a captain of the Central knights. He was forced to reveal his magic after he and his men were attacked by Owen, a powerful Northern wizard. He was summoned by a previous Sage.
Riquet Ortiz (リケ・オルティス, Rike Orutisu)
Voiced by: Yuusuke Nagano
Riquet Ortiz is an apostle of the cult he was born and raised in. He was raised to believe that wizards are meant to serve humans and that the world outside his church is corrupted. He was summoned by the player Sage.

=== Northern Wizards ===
Snow (スノウ, Sunō)
Voiced by: Chihiro Suzuki
Despite his child-like appearance, Snow is one of the oldest wizards in the world, alongside his twin, White.
White (ホワイト, Howaito)
Voiced by: Takuma Terashima
One of the oldest wizards in the world, he is actually a spirit and was killed by Snow. To escape his loneliness, Snow tethered White's soul to his so they wouldn't be apart.
Mithra (ミスラ, Misura)
Voiced by: Hiroki Takahashi
A quiet but seemingly kindhearted wizard, he is a friend of Rutile and Mitile Flores's mother and made a promise to look after them after their mother's death. He views Oz as a rival and vows he will surpass him as the strongest wizard in the world.
Owen (オーエン, Ōen)
Voiced by: Shintarō Asanuma
A powerful wizard, Owen stole one of Cain's eyes and replaced it with his own.
Bradley Bain (ブラッドリ・ーベイン, Buraddorī Bein)
Voiced by: Satoshi Hino
The former leader of a gang of wizard bandits, Bradley is a prisoner after being captured by Snow, White and Figaro.

=== Eastern Wizards ===
Faust Lavinia (ファウスト・ラウィーニア, Fausuto Rauīnia)
Voiced by: Kent Itō
Faust Lavinia is a former revolutionary who turned to curse-working after being betrayed by his human comrades.
Shino Sherwood (シノ・シャーウッド, Shino Shāuddo)
Voiced by: Nobuhiko Okamoto
Shino was a monster hunter and guardian of the Sherwood Forest before he was summoned by the player Sage. He is childhood friends with Heathcliff and works as a servant for the Blanchett family.
Heathcliff Blanchett (ヒースクリフ・ブランシェット, Hīsukurifu Buranshetto)
Voiced by: Keisuke Koumoto
Heath is a quiet and gentle young man who distrusts humans. He views Faust as a beloved mentor.
Nero Turner (ネロ・ターナー, Nero Tānā)
Voiced by: Noriaki Sugiyama
Nero was a restaurant owner and chef before he was summoned by the player Sage. He kept his identity as a wizard hidden before to avoid others judging and treating him differently. He enjoys cooking for others, and despite his cool attitude, seems to genuinely care for others.

=== Western Wizards ===
Shylock Bennett (シャイロック・ベネット, Shairokku Benetto)
Voiced by: Shinnosuke Tachibana
Shylock is a mysterious man who has a history with Murr Hart. He presents himself as mild-mannered and charming, but hides a darker side.
Murr Hart (ムル・ハート, Muru Hāto)
Voiced by: Mizuki Nakamura
Murr is a wizard who proclaims he is in love with the moon, the Great Calamity. According to Shylock, his love for the Great Calamity resulted in his psyche/soul being shattered and dispersed. Originally, Murr was a great philosopher, and it was this persona the Player Sage encounters in the elevator to the new world.
Currently, Murr is a happy-go-lucky, eccentric guy who cares little of what others think and just wants to have fun.
Chloe Collins (クロエ・コリンズ, Kuroe Korinzu)
Voiced by: Kōhei Amasaki
Chloe Collins is a tailor who was rescued from his neglectful household by Rustica. He was summoned by the player Sage.
Rustica Ferch (ラスティカ・フェルチ, Rasutika Feruchi)
Voiced by: Katsuyuki Miura
He was summoned by the player Sage. He is currently searching for his bride, after waking up with no recollection of his previous memories, and intends to trap them in his birdcage

=== Southern Wizards ===
Figaro Garcia (フィガロ・ガルシア, Figaro Garushia)
Voiced by: Toshiyuki Morikawa
Figaro was the head physician at a small clinic and was already acquainted with Rutile, Mitile, and Lennox before he was summoned by the player Sage. Prior to even that, he worked with Oz to conquer the world.
Rutile Flores (ルチル・フローレス, Ruchiru Furōresu)
Voiced by: Shun'ichi Toki
Rutile Flores is an upbeat school teacher. He was summoned by the player Sage.
Lennox Ram (レノックス・ラム, Renokkusu Ramu)
Voiced by: Yuichi Jose
Lennox was a normal shepherd before he was summoned by the player Sage. He likes animals, has a gentle and quiet demeanor, and served under Faust during his revolutionary days.
Mitile Flores (ミチル・フローレス, Michiru Furōresu)
Voiced by: Ayumu Murase
Mitile Flores is Rutile's younger brother. He was summoned by the player Sage.

== Media ==
=== Anime ===
There have been two animated commercial messages, one produced by A-1 Pictures for the first anniversary and another produced by Wit Studio for the second anniversary.

An anime adaptation of Promise of Wizard was announced during the game's fourth anniversary livestream on November 12, 2023. It was later confirmed to be a television series produced by Liden Films and directed by Naoyuki Tatsuwa, with Nanami Higuchi writing and overseeing series scripts, Nozomi Nagatomo designing the characters and serving as chief animation director, and Shūji Katayama composing the music at Pony Canyon. The series aired from January 6 to March 24, 2025, on Tokyo MX and other networks. The opening theme song is "Year N", performed by Mili, and the ending theme song is "Bokura wa Ai ni Koishite Ikiru" (僕らは愛に恋して生きる, We live, falling in love with love), performed by virtual idol group LIP×LIP. Crunchyroll streamed the series.

==== Episodes ====
No.	Title	Directed by (Note: Production staff information is taken from the ending credits of each episode.)	Written by	Storyboarded by	Original release date
1	"The Wind Is Strong, and the Cats Are in a Frenzy"; Transliteration: "Kaze ga Tsuyokute, Neko ga Sawagu" (Japanese: 風が強くて、猫が騒ぐ)	Naoyuki Tatsuwa	Bunta Tsushimi	Naoyuki Tatsuwa	January 6, 2025
After completing her nightly routine, Akira Masaki is whisked away to a strange world where humans and wizards coexist as different peoples. Summoned as the next "Great Sage" who supposedly is able to lead the wizards and fight the Great Calamity that appears once every year to try and destroy the world, she encounters an unnamed, purple-haired man who professes he hopes they'll be friend in a magical elevator before he disappears. After arriving, she is almost taken into custody by force by humans when she is reluctantly to follow them. She is rescued by two wizards, Cain Knightley and Heathcliff Blanchett, and meets up with fellow wizards Shylock Bennett and Murr Hart (who appears to be the stranger from the elevator). They give her a brief rundown of events before her arrival and plead with her to at least help them heal their friend, Faust Lavinia, who was mortally wounded. They escape on broomsticks and make their way to the Wizards' Manor.
2	"Those Who Defy the Cruel Moon"; Transliteration: "Zankoku na tsuki ni Aragau Shatachi" (Japanese: 残酷な月に抗う者たち)	Nagaoka Yoshitaka	Bunta Tsushimi	Naoyuki Tatsuwa	January 13, 2025
At the manor before their arrival, wizards Oz, Snow, and White (young-appearing twin boys) discuss Faust's condition, and the Northern wizards--Mithra, Owen, and Bradley Bain--depart since they are no longer needed. Snow and White prevent Bradley, a convict in their custody, from leaving then check on Faust with Oz. Akira and the others arrive and Oz draws power from her to use advanced healing magic on Faust, saving his life. Oz then leaves amidst protest (mostly from Cain) and Akira struggles to adjust to her new reality. After spending some time with the wizards, Akira learns some things, including how she might return home, that the moon is the Great Calamity, and that she is needed to summon new wizards to replace the ones who were recently killed.
3	"A Heartfelt Breakfast"; Transliteration: "Magokoro o Komete, Chōshoku o" (Japanese: 真心を込めて、朝食を)	Misato Takada	Bunta Tsushimi	Takashi Tawabata	January 20, 2025
Cain has issues with his vision as he retrieves Akira to perform the wizard summoning and can't see her, but brushes it off even when he can't see the others initially, either. Ten new wizards from all regions of the world--North, South, East, West, and Central--are summoned after Akira chugs a goblet of black sludge, and she learns that these regions dictate the inhabitants' personality and values. After learning Southern wizards are kind and gentle, she really wants to meet them. In the South, Rutile and Mitile (who are brothers), Figaro, and Lennox discuss receiving their summoning marks and that all the Southern wizards must have been killed for them to have all been chosen.
4	"The Unknown, Fear, and Mutual Prosperity"; Transliteration: "Michi to Osore to Kyōei to" (Japanese: 未知と恐れと共栄と)	Shunji Yoshida	Bunta Tsushimi	Shinobu Yoshioka	January 27, 2025
A human Akira encountered from her arrival, Cock Robin, is caught sneaking around the wizards' base, and confesses he was ordered to draw the Sage out so the humans can use her to control the wizards. Everyone generally agrees that it would be best for humans and wizards to get along, and strange ailments are afflicting the wizards, likely a result of the Great Calamity's power having left wounds on their souls. As Minister Drummond and human soldiers of the Central Kingdom attack the Manor, the new wizards arrive in time to help--including Prince Arthur Granvelle of the Central Kingdom, who shames his subordinates. Arthur suggests they throw a party to welcome and get to know the new wizards.
5	"A Mixer With Some Free-Willed Wizards"; Transliteration: "Kimama na Mahōtsukai to Gōkon o" (Japanese: 気ままな魔法使いと合コンを)	Keiichi Sekino	Bunta Tsushimi	Keiichi Sekino	February 3, 2025
The group throws a small party, which really just functions like a mass meeting. Cain once again brings up wanting all the chosen wizards to stay at the Manor so they can all train and prepare for next year's Great Calamity together, to mixed reception. Tensions rise when Shino Sherwood, an Eastern wizard, states that Southern wizards are weak, and Akira defuses the situation. It's concluded that Oz is the only one capable of uniting the wizards because he's the only one strong enough to impose and uphold rules of cooperation. It's also decided that a parade and official inauguration should be held to introduce the new wizards and present a united front to assuage the fears of the populace. Arthur, Cain, Akira, and Riquet Oritz (a priest from the Central Kingdom), set off to recruit Oz, though he coolly refuses and orders them to leave just before an ancient Grand Dragon arrives that Oz faces alone.
6	"Something Someone as Innocent as You Can Do"; Transliteration: "Mukuna Anata ni Dekiru Koto" (Japanese: 無垢なあなたにできること)	Tetsuaki Matsuda	Bunta Tsushimi	Takashi Tawabata	February 10, 2025
The day of the parade, Chloe Collins, a Western wizard and tailor, brings a messenger from Arthur to Akira: they are to delay their departure, as the event itself has been delayed. While Chloe is excited, Nero, a restaurant owner from the Eastern region, doesn't have any faith it will endear them to the public and refuses to participate in the parade. Riquet struggles to adjust to life outside the Church, and Rutile and Mitile teach him how to read and write, which inspires Nero to change his mind about the parade. Robin, transformed into a bird, arrives suddenly and tells them the parade is about to start, revealing the earlier messenger seemingly deceived them intentionally to sabotage the event and make the wizards look bad. Chloe makes them all matching outfits so they'll be taken more seriously, and the parade goes off without a hitch.
7	"Uninvited Guests at the Party"; Transliteration: "Shuen ni Manekarezaru Kyaku" (Japanese: 酒宴に招かれざる客)	Nagaoka Yoshitaka	Bunta Tsushimi	Kaori Higuchi	February 17, 2025
8	"The Fragments of the Distorted Miracle"; Transliteration: "Ibitsuna Kiseki no Kakeratachi" (Japanese: いびつな奇跡のかけらたち)	Ryuta Yamamoto	Bunta Tsushimi	Manabu Yukawa	February 24, 2025
9	"A Melancholic Dance on Thin Ice"; Transliteration: "Hakuhyō no Ue de Monōgena Dansu o" (Japanese: 薄氷の上で物憂げなダンスを)	Shunji Yoshida	Bunta Tsushimi	Tomoko Akiyama	March 3, 2025
10	"I Can Keep Walking Even If I'm All Alone"; Transliteration: "Hitori Bocchi de Aruiteikeru" (Japanese: ひとりぼっちで歩いていける)	Masayuki Iimura	Bunta Tsushimi	migmi	March 10, 2025
11	"The Bird of Omen Awakens"; Transliteration: "Kizashi no Tori no Me wa Samete" (Japanese: 兆しの鳥の目は醒めて)	Nagaoka Yoshitaka	Bunta Tsushimi	Keiichi Sekino	March 17, 2025
12	"May Your World Be Blessed"; Transliteration: "Anata no Sekai ni Shukufuku o" (Japanese: あなたの世界に祝福を)	Tetsuaki Mita	Bunta Tsushimi	Tetsuaki Mita	March 24, 2025

=== Stage play ===
The first series of stage plays broke the first main story into three parts. The second series followed the plotlines of the first major event series in the game, entitled Preludes to the Festival, where the wizards of each country perform a ritual to appease the spirits of their homeland.

The third series has been announced to follow the second major event series of the game, the Etudes, which dive deeper into the relationships between the wizards.

== See also ==
- Idolish7, a rhythm game with Bunta Tsushimi serving as the scriptwriter of the game, author of its novel adaptation, author of multiple of its manga adaptations, and writer of its film's screenplay.
