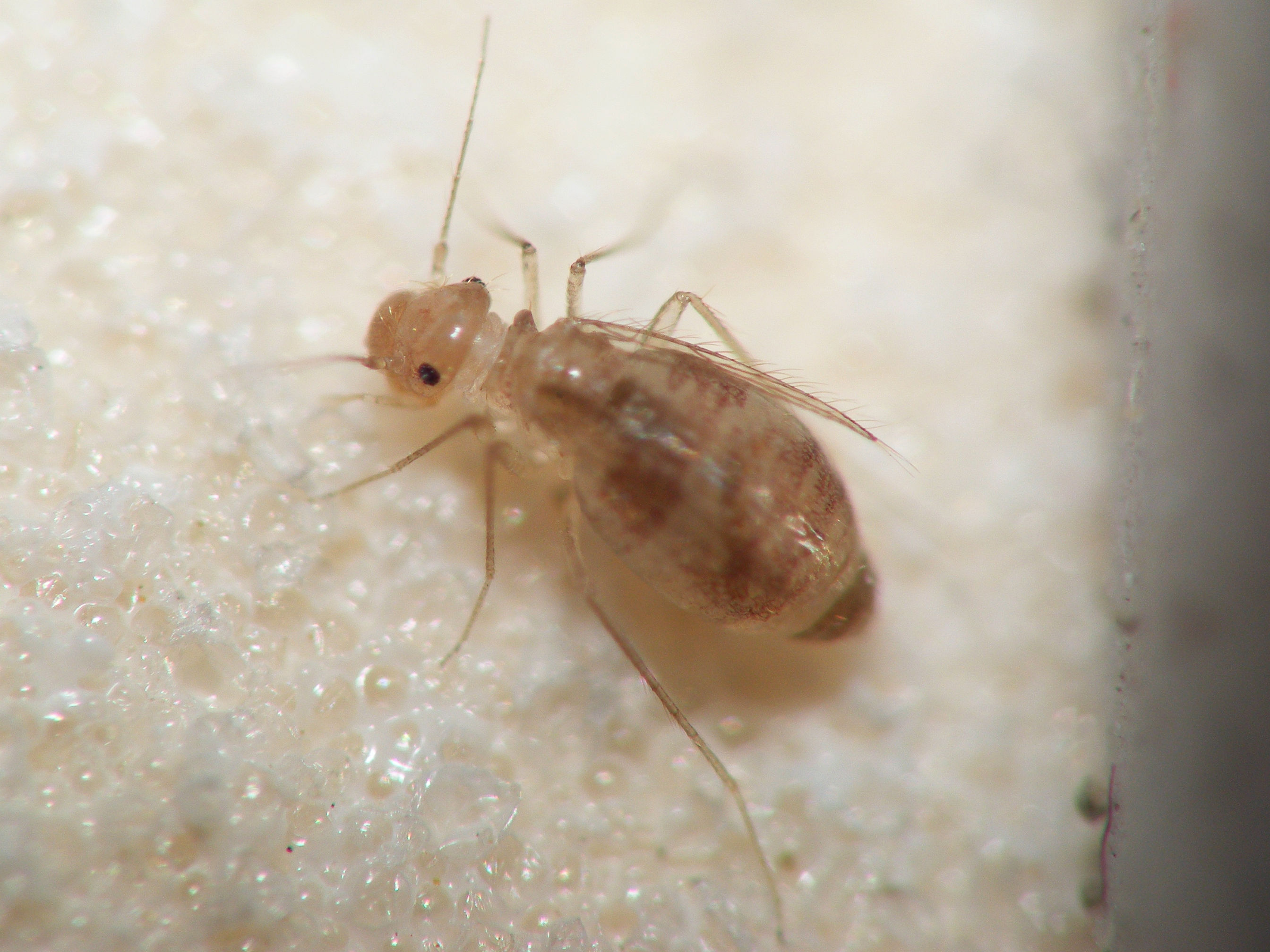
- Dorypteryx domestica

Scientific classification
- Domain: Eukaryota
- Kingdom: Animalia
- Phylum: Arthropoda
- Class: Insecta
- Order: Psocodea
- Family: Psyllipsocidae
- Genus: Dorypteryx; Aaron, 1883

= Dorypteryx =

Genus of booklice

Dorypteryx is a genus of cave barklice in the family Psyllipsocidae. There are at least 4 described species in Dorypteryx.

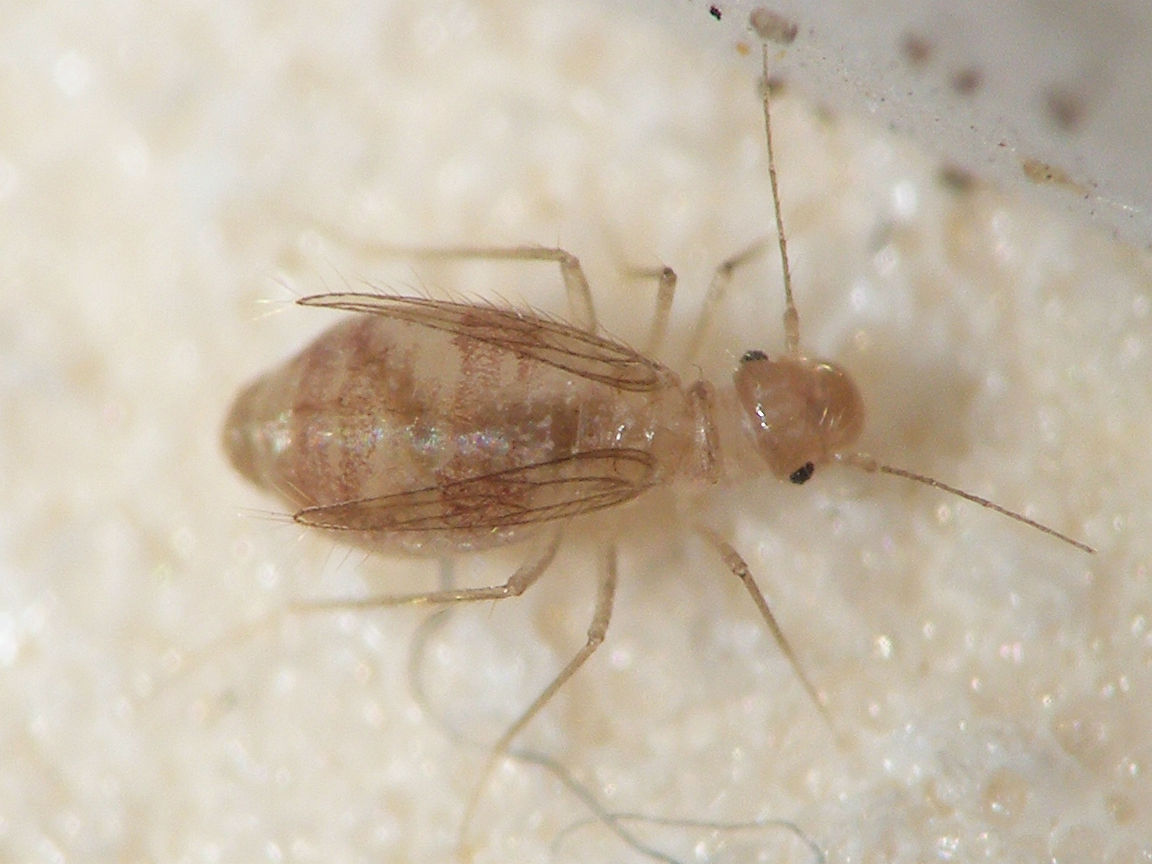
Dorypteryx domestica

== Species ==
- Dorypteryx domestica (Smithers, 1958)
- Dorypteryx longipennis Smithers, 1991
- Dorypteryx pallida Aaron, 1883
- Dorypteryx yunnanica Li, Fasheng & X. Liu 2009
