= List of Rayark games =

Video game company

Rayark Inc.
- Type: Private
- Industry: Video games
- Founded: September, 2011 in Taipei, Taiwan
- Headquarters: Taipei, Taiwan
- Key people: Alvin Chung; Ming-Yang, Yu; Jerry Chang; Holymars Hsieh; Tony Lee; Anton Mark-Hitchman; Shan-Yung
- Number of employees: 258 (2022)
- Website: https://www.rayark.com

Rayark Inc. (also known as Rayark Games and Rayark International Limited) is an independent video game company headquartered in Taipei, Taiwan. It was founded in September 2011. Rayark runs a branch in Tokyo, Japan, where the 2015 iOS Game of the Year award-winning title, Implosion: Never Lose Hope, and accompanying feature animation film was written and directed. The company develops and publishes videogames on PlayStation 4, Mobile, and PC platforms, showcasing titles in various genres including sci-fi, fantasy, rhythm, casual games, and strategy RPGs. Rayark is widely known for developing the breakout hits Cytus and Deemo, the PlayStation 4 title Deemo: Reborn, and a partnership with Capcom leading to the development of Japanese arcade machines.

== Awards ==
Rayark received the 2015 iOS Game of the Year for Asia, the Bahamut ACG, and the Unity Golden Cube.

== Games developed ==
Year	Title	Genre(s)	Platform(s)	Ref(s)
2011	Cytus	Rhythm	IOS, Android	
2012	Mandora	Casual	IOS, Android	
2013	Deemo	Rhythm	IOS, Android	
2015	Implosion: Never Lose Hope	Action role-playing game	IOS, Android, Nintendo Switch	
2016	Voez	Rhythm	IOS, Android, Nintendo Switch	
2018	Cytus II	Rhythm	IOS, Android	
2018	Sdorica	Tactical role-playing game	IOS, Android	
2019	Cytus α	Rhythm	Nintendo Switch	
2019	Deemo: Reborn	Rhythm	PS4, PlayStation VR, Microsoft Windows, Nintendo Switch, IOS, Android	
2020	Soul of Eden	Real-time strategy, Trading card game	IOS, Android	
2022	Deemo II	Rhythm	IOS, Android	

== Games published ==
Year	Title	Developer	Genre(s)	Platform(s)
2019	MO: Astray	Archpray	Platformer	Microsoft Windows, IOS, Android, Nintendo Switch
