= Implosion: Never Lose Hope =

2015 video game

- Developer: Rayark
- Publishers: WW: Rayark (iOS, Android); JP: Flyhigh Works (NS); WW: Circle Entertainment (NS)
- Directors: Yung-Ting Tony Lee; Alvin Chung; Anton Mark-Hitchman
- Producer: Ming-Yang Yu
- Designers: Ryan Lee; QQ Lin; Ada Tsukiyo
- Programmers: Jimmy Hwang; Chun-Fu Chao; Kenyi Feis Lee
- Artist: Agugu Lin
- Writer: Anton Mark-Hitchman
- Composers: Kevin Penkin; Taku Sakakibara
- Platforms: iOS; Android; Nintendo Switch
- Release: iOS, Android: WW: 8 April 2015; Nintendo Switch: WW: 6 July 2017
- Genres: Action, hack 'n' slash

Implosion: Never Lose Hope is an action video game developed and published by Rayark, and released on April 8, 2015, for iOS and Android and on July 6, 2017, for the Nintendo Switch.

Never Lose Hope received critical acclaim and was awarded the 2015 iOS Game of the Year for Asia, with praise going to its impressive visuals, exciting gameplay, first-class voice acting and full orchestral scores. While some critics praised the story, others argued it utilised cliché storytelling biased towards a "campy" sci-fi audience. Other criticisms went to the lack of explanation regarding the weapon upgrade system.

The gameplay—combining hack and slash and top-down shooting elements—features exploration and combat in various environments, in addition to VR Survival Modes that grant experience and allow customization of the main character's abilities with items called ARK fragments. Conversations between characters and animated cutscenes occur at crucial story points.

Set in the year 2201, Never Lose Hope focuses on Jacob Francis Carloway, a Warmech pilot serving the Ivonix, a faction on the leading edge of advanced technology. An attack on Earth by Alien life forms called XADA in 2178 forces humanity to evacuate to the nearest hospitable planet in the Tau system. Twenty years following the invasion, the survivors in the Tau system detect an incoming attack from the Earth and deploy two Warmech suits to investigate and eliminate the threat forming on the Earth's surface.

Development of Never Lose Hope began in 2012 with a small team within the indie studio Rayark, after a redirected attempt to create an Xbox title. Key influences included artificial intelligence and man-machine integration, which influenced the story, graphics and music while combining with typical cyberpunk elements.

After release, an expansion episode titled Implosion: Last Man Standing was developed, featuring a new playable character and a separate story mission. The Last Man Standing episode received additional praise for its revamped gameplay elements.

== Gameplay ==
The Avalon Warmech, advancing through a chapter 1 environment. Shown are the HUD with available Reactor Acquisition (RA) abilities, Jake's health and currently equipped weapon and ammunition level.

Implosion is a third-person hack-and-slash that allows players to use their mecha's sword as well as ranged gun attacks. The player's mecha uses rolling to dodge enemy attacks and can combo attacks in sequence. The mecha is also customizable with different parts bought from a shop, which can change how it controls, although the gameplay is mainly skill-based.

The mobile version uses touch controls and is also compatible with external controllers. For the Nintendo Switch, the dual stick controllers are used.

The game grades the player at the end of the level, lowering the reward if the player fails the same level multiple times. The levels can be replayed for a higher score, which is also displayed on the game's leaderboard.

An alternate Warmech named "Crimson" can be unlocked and is piloted by Jake's teammate, Diana May. Crimson is faster and harder-hitting than Jake's Avalon Warmech, and utilises hover-wings to fly out of the way of incoming attacks rather than a rolling dodge. Its primary weapon is a staff.

Finally, there is a third Warmech piloted by Jake's uncle, Jonathan Carloway. It is only accessible through a separate campaign following the story of the main campaign and through a VR combat simulator. It is a Warmech II, meaning it lacks any form of shield or dodge whatsoever, making it a very vulnerable target. However, its attacks are all ranged, allowing a significant amount of damage from a distance using both dual pistols, a laser rifle, and a multitude of abilities. Its ARK system is also unique, as it only has 3 slots (compared to Avalon's and Crimson's 6). These three slots are all the same type, and all of the corresponding parts unlock abilities.

== Synopsis ==
=== Setting ===
Implosion: Never Lose Hope takes place in the year 2201, 20 years after an alien invasion and subsequent evacuation of Earth. Never Lose Hope is set in a dystopian future splintered by opposing surviving factions and political subterfuge: among these factions are Ivonix, Thandeous and Adrillia. Leading up to Implosion: Never Lose Hope, there have been marked shortfalls in human society, with global warming and overpopulation taking a toll. To answer for this, advances in quantum mechanics and zero-point energy are made, leading to the testing of long-distance space travel technology. The testing of this exploration technology is what attracts the hostile "XADA" to Earth. Escaping Earth, the three factions settle in nearby to one another: Adrillia occupies the best land and colonises the prime planet "Gaia", creating a bitter rivalry with Thandeous who are forced onto a harsh nearby moon "Cetos". Orbiting Gaia in the Night Star artificial habitat is the Ivonix, the creators of the Warmech battle suits. 20 years following the evacuation, an Ivonix team returns to Earth to investigate a new threat coming from their former home which could reach across the galaxy and wipe out the surviving human factions 12 light years away.

Adrillia
Characterising themselves as superior pillars of democracy, the Adrillian nation has attracted backlashes from other well-equipped forces in the past. The Adrillian capital was able to withstand the initial XADA onslaught, thanks to the strength of their air force.
Thandeous
Thandeons are revered for their hardy infantry and mechanical ground force. The first iteration of the Warmech battle suit was created in their lab. The program was only relinquished to the better equipped Ivonix after the XADA adapted to overcome the technology.
Ivonix
A technocratic nation, the Ivonix possess the most advanced artificial habitat ever constructed, the Night Star. After their earth-based positions were overrun, engineers took over the Warmech project and deployed a complete redesign to the field.
Xeno-Axial Dianotropic Amorphid (XADA)
The name that was given to the ever-changing biological entity was first coined by Dr. Sefano Rutger, after a dissection of a small amount of separated tissue. He surmised that the creatures exist in an ever-present state of flux and that they can adapt their physical and chemical properties to make use of all other structures in their environment (organic or synthetic).

=== Characters ===
The main protagonist is Jake Carloway: the son of a military officer, he lived a humble childhood until the invasion, where custody was given to his Uncle following the death of his parents and paralysis of his younger sister. After escaping Earth without his uncle, Jake grew to adulthood on the Night Star artificial habitat, eventually becoming a Warmech pilot. Preoccupied with thoughts of his uncle's unknown status, Jake obsesses over the possibility that Jonathan Carloway may still be alive, fighting back the alien menace by himself on Earth.

=== Plot ===
Arriving back on Earth after a 20-year hiatus, Jake Carloway and Diana May deploy their Warmech battle-suits to combat a new threat growing on Earth's surface. They are tasked with destroying a collection of growing XADA material called an AZA, intended to attack whole planets. After arriving and discovering an enclave of survivors, Jake and Diana learn that a former Thandeous scientist "Dr Raymond Millar" had developed a masking agent to help hide survivors for the past two decades. It is revealed that the supply of mask has been cut off and the Doctor has recently sided with the invading entity, along with his wife "Dr Goldie Millar". The mystery behind the AZA growing on the Earth's surface is later discovered, revealing the scientists had been communicating over Quantum relay with their bitter Thandeous kin and set out on a plan to eliminate the Adrillian faction using an AZA, and then deploying mask to clear Gaia for colonisation by the "rightful" Thandeous. The Doctor, however, double-crossed his previously sworn faction when he sided with the XADA entity and plans on eliminating all remaining humans, regardless of factional allegiance.

Jake discovers his uncle is alive and joins forces with him to stop the XADA. Together they discover the Doctor used beacons to open a wormhole connecting Earth and Gaia and intends to send the large mass of XADA (called an AZA) through the rift to destroy the remnants of the human race. After shutting down all the visible beacons, they realise the final beacon keeping the wormhole open is inside Dr Millar's body. After eliminating him the wormhole remains open and they face the XADA Queen who has taken over control of the wormhole with psionic ability. Jake's uncle is killed by the Queen, and in turn, Jake gives his own life to eliminate her using his self-destruct protocol.

Three days later, war is on the verge of breaking out between Thandeous and Adrillia after the discovery of the Thandeous plan to commit genocide. Jake's body is shown being reanimated back on the Night-Star using an artificial intelligence, by a woman in a wheelchair. She asks the AI what its name is. The AI states it has no name and asks her to choose one for it. The game ends just as she is about to answer.

== Development ==
=== Scenario ===
The script of Implosion: Never Lose Hope was based on an original concept by Executive Producer, Ming-Yang Yu, and written and directed by Anton Mark-Hitchman, who also directed the game's cutscenes, the Last Man Standing expansion and the voice acting performances. The writer/director was brought on as a project lead after his work with teams from Diablo, Halo and Final Fantasy VII's Nobuo Uematsu. Lore surrounding technology in the game and many item names sought influence in large part from the writer's studies in medical science, biomechanics and cognitive psychology. The ending of the game was a nod to cliché sci-fi stories whereby destroying a single alien hive mind disables an entire enemy species and the protagonists reign victorious.

When creating the character interplay of Jake and co-pilot Diana, a sarcastic and cheesy camaraderie was used, born out of the idea that the characters were raised in computer simulations since a young age, away from any real danger or consequence and lived nearly their entire lives in space. Over 160 Graphene Display Unit entries were written in the form of e-mails between characters, diaries, and secret government communications to help explain the back-story. This world building device was a hidden narrative, with players having to complete a level, then scroll back to the level they had just completed and click a newly appeared cube on the level's image. The difficulty in discovering this without a tutorial led some players to confusion and misunderstanding of crucial plot points, technology, and the nature of the game's antagonist.

=== Music ===
The background music was composed by Kevin Penkin and performed by the Eminence Symphony Orchestra, while boss battle tracks were composed by Taku Sakakibara of Beatmania fame and performed by his symphony orchestra gaQdan. Mixing was handled by two-time Grammy Award winner John Kurlander of The Lord of the Rings Trilogy fame. The ending theme song was composed by Kevin Penkin with vocals provided by Donna Burke. The additional track "Waiting for you to die" was composed and performed by Alpha Legion.

== Related media ==
A 90-minute anime film is currently underway, entitled Implosion: Zero_Day, which acts as a prequel to the game and showcases the invasion of Earth and how Jake's uncle survived. The film explores the points that the game did not expand on, such as what the XADA really are and the real reason they hunted down humanity.

A 150-page Data_Book published by Rayark Inc. contains otherwise unreleased art and stories from the lives of the game characters.

== Reception ==
Reception

Aggregate score
Aggregator	Score
Metacritic	iOS: 93/100; NS: 74/100

Review score
Publication	Score
TouchArcade	iOS: 5/5

Implosion received multiple awards, including the 2015 iOS Game of the Year for the Asia region, 2015 Bahamut ACG award and a 2014 Unity Awards Golden Cube. One week into the release on App Store, Implosion was ranked 7th in Top Grossing and held a 91.9% five-star rating. Universal acclaim was sought from critics for the iOS version, and Implosion possesses an aggregate score of 93 out of 100 on Metacritic, matching Supergiant Games' hit title Transistor. Shaun Musgrave of TouchArcade rated the game 5/5 stars, calling it "a well designed game with enjoyable progression, fun customization, and fairly deep mechanics", and saying that he is "head over heels for Implosion". Harry Slater of Pocket Gamer rated the game 9/10 and gave it the Pocket Gamer Gold Award, calling the graphics "impressive" and the control system "brilliant", while calling the story of the game "not the most original [...] in the world". Rob Rich of 148Apps rated the game 4.5/5 stars, saying that while the game "makes some bold claims", it "actually lives up to expectations", and calls it a "blast to play".

The Nintendo Switch version has accumulated an aggregate score of 74 out of 100 on Metacritic. Justin Nation of Nintendo World Report rated the game 90/100, calling it "the best current example of an 'indie' title that looks and plays like a AAA game".
