= Psyllipsocus =

Psyllipsocus Temporal range: Cenomanian–Recent

Scientific classification
- Kingdom: Animalia
- Phylum: Arthropoda
- Class: Insecta
- Order: Psocodea
- Family: Psyllipsocidae
- Genus: Psyllipsocus; Selys-Longchamps, 1872

Genus of booklice

Psyllipsocus is a genus of cave barklice in the family Psyllipsocidae. There are more than 50 described species in Psyllipsocus.

== Species ==
These 56 species belong to the genus Psyllipsocus:

- Psyllipsocus albipalpus Mockford, 2011
- Psyllipsocus angustipennis Lienhard, 2014
- Psyllipsocus apache Mockford, 2011
- Psyllipsocus batuensis Thornton, 1962
- Psyllipsocus bombayensis Menon, 1942
- Psyllipsocus chamela Garcia Aldrete, 1984
- Psyllipsocus chiquibulensis Garcia Aldrete, 1997
- Psyllipsocus clunioventralis Lienhard, 2014
- Psyllipsocus clunjunctus Lienhard, 2013
- Psyllipsocus decoratus Mockford, 2011
- Psyllipsocus delamarei Badonnel, 1962
- Psyllipsocus didymus Lienhard, 2014
- Psyllipsocus disparunguis Lienhard, 2009
- Psyllipsocus dorae Badonnel, 1973
- Psyllipsocus edentulus Menon, 1942
- Psyllipsocus falcifer Lienhard, 2014
- Psyllipsocus flexuosus Mockford, 2011
- Psyllipsocus fuscipalpus Mockford, 2011
- Psyllipsocus fuscistigma Lienhard, 2014
- Psyllipsocus garciamolinai Garcia Aldrete, 1984
- Psyllipsocus hilli Mockford, 2011
- Psyllipsocus hirsutus Thornton, 1962
- Psyllipsocus huastecanus Mockford, 2011
- Psyllipsocus hyalinus Garcia Aldrete, 1993
- Psyllipsocus kintpuashi Mockford, 2011
- Psyllipsocus maculatus Li, 2002
- Psyllipsocus marconii Lienhard, 2014
- Psyllipsocus metamicropterus Enderlein, 1908
- Psyllipsocus mili Weingardt, Liang & Yoshizawa 2025
- Psyllipsocus minutissimus Enderlein, 1920
- Psyllipsocus monticolus Garcia Aldrete, 1989
- Psyllipsocus neoleonensis Garcia Aldrete, 1993
- Psyllipsocus oculatus Gurney, 1943
- Psyllipsocus orghidani Badonnel, 1977
- Psyllipsocus ornatus Badonnel, 1973
- Psyllipsocus poblanus Mockford, 2011
- Psyllipsocus proximus Lienhard, 2014
- Psyllipsocus punctulatus Lienhard, 2014
- Psyllipsocus radiopictus Lienhard, 2014
- Psyllipsocus ramburii Selys-Longchamps, 1872
- Psyllipsocus regiomontanus Mockford, 2011
- Psyllipsocus sanxiaensis Li, 1997
- Psyllipsocus sauteri Enderlein, 1906
- Psyllipsocus serrifer Lienhard, 2013
- Psyllipsocus similis Lienhard, 2013
- Psyllipsocus sinicus Li & Yang, 1988
- Psyllipsocus spinifer Lienhard, 2014
- Psyllipsocus spinosus Badonnel, 1955
- Psyllipsocus squamatus Mockford, 2011
- Psyllipsocus stupendus Lienhard & Garcia Aldrete, 2016
- Psyllipsocus subterraneus Mockford, 2011
- Psyllipsocus subtilis Lienhard, 2014
- Psyllipsocus thaidis Lienhard, 2014
- Psyllipsocus yongi New & Lee, 1992
- Psyllipsocus yucatan Gurney, 1943
- † Psyllipsocus eocenicus Nel, Prokop, De Ploeg & Millet, 2005 Oise amber, France, Eocene
- † Psyllipsocus yoshizawai Álvarez-Parra et al. 2020 Burmese amber, Myanmar, Cenomanian
