= Goblin Slayer =

Japanese dark fantasy light novel series and its franchise

- First light novel cover, featuring the Priestess (left) and Goblin Slayer (right)

ゴブリンスレイヤー (Goburin Sureiyā)
- Genre: Adventure; Dark fantasy
- Light novel
- Written by: Kumo Kagyu
- Illustrated by: Noboru Kannatsuki
- Published by: SB Creative
- English publisher: NA: Yen Press
- Imprint: GA Bunko
- Original run: February 15, 2016 – present
- Volumes: 16
Further information
Manga
Written by	Kōsuke Kurose
Published by	Square Enix
English publisher	NA: Yen Press
Magazine	Monthly Big Gangan
Original run	May 25, 2016 – present
Volumes	17
Manga
Goblin Slayer Side Story: Year One
Written by	Kento Eida
Published by	Square Enix
English publisher	NA: Yen Press
Magazine	Young Gangan
Original run	September 15, 2017 – present
Volumes	14
Light novel
Goblin Slayer Side Story: Year One
Written by	Kumo Kagyu
Illustrated by	Shingo Adachi
Published by	SB Creative
English publisher	NA: Yen Press
Original run	March 15, 2018 – present
Volumes	4
Manga
Goblin Slayer: Brand New Day
Written by	Masahiro Ikeno
Published by	Square Enix
English publisher	NA: Yen Press
Magazine	Monthly Big Gangan
Original run	May 25, 2018 – May 25, 2019
Volumes	2
Anime television series
Directed by	Takaharu Ozaki (Note: Credited as Chief Director (総監督, Sō Kantoku) for the second season.); Misato Takada (S2)
Produced by	Tsuyoshi Aida; Noritomo Isogai; Mitsutoshi Ogura; Tadayuki Akita (S1); Satoshi Fukao (S1); Yūichi Izumi (S1); Yōhei Kikuchi (S1); Tatsuya Ueki (S2); Yoshihiro Ishikawa (S2); Kazuki Matsumoto (S2); Reiko Fushimi (S2)
Written by	Hideyuki Kurata; Yōsuke Kuroda (S1)
Music by	Kenichiro Suehiro
Studio	White Fox (S1); Liden Films (S2)
Licensed by	Crunchyroll; SA/SEA: Muse Communication
Original network	AT-X, Tokyo MX, Sun TV, BS11
Original run	October 7, 2018 – December 22, 2023
Episodes	24
Light novel
Goblin Slayer Side Story II: Dai Katana
Written by	Kumo Kagyu
Illustrated by	Lack
Published by	SB Creative
English publisher	NA: Yen Press
Magazine	Gangan GA
Original run	August 9, 2019 – April 14, 2022
Volumes	3
Manga
Goblin Slayer Side Story II: Dai Katana
Written by	Takashi Minakuchi
Published by	Square Enix
Magazine	Manga Up!
Original run	December 28, 2018 – April 12, 2019
Manga
Goblin Slayer Side Story II: Dai Katana
Written by	Aoki Shogo
Published by	Square Enix
English publisher	NA: Yen Press
Magazine	Manga Up!
Original run	August 30, 2019 – present
Volumes	9
Anime film
Goblin Slayer: Goblin's Crown
Directed by	Takaharu Ozaki
Produced by	Tsuyoshi Aida; Tadayuki Akita; Satoshi Fukao; Noritomo Isogai; Yūichi Izumi; Yōhei Kikuchi; Mitsutoshi Ogura
Written by	Hideyuki Kurata
Music by	Kenichiro Suehiro
Studio	White Fox
Released	February 1, 2020
Runtime	85 minutes
Manga
Goblin Slayer: A Day in the Life
Written by	Daichi Matsuse
Published by	Square Enix
English publisher	NA: Yen Press
Magazine	Monthly Big Gangan
Original run	December 23, 2022 – November 25, 2024
Volumes	3
- icon

Goblin Slayer (Japanese: ゴブリンスレイヤー, Hepburn: Goburin Sureiyā) (stylized as GOBLIN SLAYER! in Latin script) is a Japanese dark fantasy light novel series written by Kumo Kagyu and illustrated by Noboru Kannatsuki. A manga adaptation by Kōsuke Kurose is serialized in the Monthly Big Gangan magazine, and a second adaptation by Masahiro Ikeno ran in the same magazine. A prequel manga by Kento Eida runs in Young Gangan. Both the novels and the manga adaptations have been licensed by North American publisher Yen Press. Three audio drama CDs have been released, bundled with the fourth, sixth, seventh, and eighth light novels. An anime television series adaptation by White Fox aired from October to December 2018. An anime film, titled Goblin Slayer: Goblin's Crown, premiered in February 2020. A second season by Liden Films aired from October to December 2023.

== Plot ==
In a world of fantasy, adventurers come from far and wide to join the Guild. They complete contracts to earn gold and glory. An inexperienced priestess joins her first adventuring party, but comes into danger after her first contact involving goblins goes wrong. As the rest of her party is either wiped out or raped, she is saved by a man known as Goblin Slayer, an adventurer whose only purpose is the eradication of goblins with extreme prejudice.

== Characters ==
The characters in this story do not carry proper names but are named by their classes or occupations.

Goblin Slayer (ゴブリンスレイヤー, Goburin Sureiyā)
Voiced by: Yūichirō Umehara (Japanese); Brad Hawkins (English)
A 20-year-old silver ranked adventurer who only concerns himself with hunting goblins (小鬼(ゴブリン), goburin; lit. 'little demon'). The Guild has given him a Specialist classification due to the number of goblins that he has killed as well as his work in studying their habits and biology. Uninterested in fame or glory, Goblin Slayer is only interested in goblin hunting quests. As a child, he was the sole survivor of a goblin attack on his village, an event that defined his deep hatred and obsession of killing all goblins.
Priestess (女神官, Onna Shinkan)
Voiced by: Yui Ogura (Japanese); Hayden Daviau (English)
The main female protagonist. She is initially a 15-year-old porcelain ranked adventurer, the lowest rank. She is capable of performing healing magic, miracle of holy light, and protective spells with a high amount of proficiency. She is saved by Goblin Slayer and joins his party. She is an orphan who was raised in a temple. She is very fond of Goblin Slayer.
Cow Girl (牛飼娘, Ushikai Musume)
Voiced by: Yuka Iguchi (Japanese); Brittany Lauda (English)
Goblin Slayer's childhood best friend and a farm hand on her uncle's farm. Her uncle took her in his farm as an assistant at first, but adopted her after her and the Goblin Slayer's families were massacred by Goblins. She clearly cares deeply for Goblin Slayer, though he seems oblivious of her affection.
Guild Girl (受付嬢, Uketsukejō)
Voiced by: Maaya Uchida (Japanese); Sara Ragsdale (English)
A young woman who runs the Guild's front office as a receptionist and hands out contracts to adventurers. She respects Goblin Slayer.
High Elf Archer (妖精弓手(エルフ), Erufu)
Voiced by: Nao Tōyama (Japanese); Mallorie Rodak (English)
A 2,000-year-old high elf (上森人(ハイエルフ), hai erufu; lit. 'high forest (hu)man') adventurer of Ranger (野伏(レンジャー), renjā) class. She came with Dwarf Shaman and Lizard Priest to find Goblin Slayer and recruit his help. She is a Silver ranked adventurer.
Dwarf Shaman (鉱人道士(ドワーフ), Dowāfu)
Voiced by: Yuichi Nakamura (Japanese); Barry Yandell (English)
A 107-year-old Dwarf (鉱人(ドワーフ), dowāfu; lit. 'ore (hu)man') adventurer of spellcaster (精霊使い(シャーマン), shāman; lit. 'spirit user') class and party member with High Elf and Lizard Priest. He sometimes proves more knowledgeable than High Elf, despite being much younger. He is a Silver ranked adventurer.
Lizard Priest (蜥蜴僧侶(リザードマン), Rizādoman)
Voiced by: Tomokazu Sugita (Japanese); Josh Bangle (English)
A Lizardman (蜥蜴人(リザードマン), rizādoman) adventurer and party member with High Elf and Dwarf Shaman. He can use healing magic, but he also uses a sword to fight and can summon skeletal familiars to assist him in battle. He often acts as a mediator between Dwarf and High Elf. His goal is to become a dragon. He is a Silver ranked adventurer.
Witch (魔女, Majo)
Voiced by: Yoko Hikasa (Japanese); Amanda Gish (English)
A sorceress who is an acquaintance of Goblin Slayer. She is Spearman's partner.
Spearman (槍使い, Yari Tsukai)
Voiced by: Yoshitsugu Matsuoka (Japanese); Kyle Igneczi (English)
A warrior who is Witch's partner. He has a crush on Guild Girl. Spearman has the reputation of being the strongest adventurer of the borderlands.
Sword Maiden (剣の乙女, Tsurugi no Otome)
Voiced by: Aya Endō (Japanese); Meg McClain (English)
A hero who helped defeat the previous Demon Lord, and now the highest authority in Water Town. Sword Maiden had no innate talents like the other heroes. She was blinded and raped by goblins and since then, she has a deep fear of them. She commands an alligator familiar and is a gold ranked adventurer and the archbishop of Supreme God. She is deeply in love with Goblin Slayer.
Noble Fencer (ノーブルフェンサー, Nōburu Fensā)
Voiced by: Sumire Uesaka (Japanese); Anairis Quiñones (English)
A swordswoman of noble origin, she left her home to become an adventurer until her party was slain by goblins and she was captured by them. She is rescued by Goblin Slayer's party by request of her parents and assists them to dispose of the goblins to avenge her fallen comrades.

== Production ==
Goblin Slayer was posted on an online textboard starting from October 2012, as a work that combined ASCII art with dialogue (the format is known as "Yaruo Thread" on Japanese internet). The series was then rewritten into the format of a novel and submitted to competitions organized by publishers. As such, the novel version was completed before the online version. The novel was subsequently amended to match the ending of the online version, which was created according to real time feedback from users on the internet. Although the novel version failed to win awards in the Fujimi Fantasia Contest, it was picked up by GA Bunko editors when the author enrolled his other works into their competition. As such the work started publishing commercially via GA Bunko.

The author and the publisher both consider the ASCII art version to be distinct from the novel. They do not consider the published novel to be based on the online version. Instead the published novel is said to be based on the version that was submitted to Fujimi Fantasia Contest.

== Media ==
=== Light novels ===
The light novels are written by Kumo Kagyu and illustrated by Noboru Kannatsuki. The series was originally published online. SB Creative published the first volume under their GA Bunko imprint on February 15, 2016. Sixteen volumes have been released in Japan as of July 2022.

The fourth volume of the light novel included an original audio drama CD written by Kagyu, as did the sixth, seventh, eighth, tenth, twelfth, and fourteenth volumes.

A spin-off novel written by Kagyu and illustrated by Shingo Adachi, titled Goblin Slayer Side Story: Year One (ゴブリンスレイヤー外伝：イヤーワン, Goburin Sureiyā Gaiden: Iyā Wan), published the first volume on March 15, 2018. It is a prequel series that reveals Goblin Slayer's past and the events that led him to become an adventurer with the sole purpose of exterminating all goblins from the world.

Kagyu released a second spinoff, titled Goblin Slayer Side Story II: Dai Katana (ゴブリンスレイヤー外伝2 鍔鳴の太刀《ダイ・カタナ》, Goburin Sureiyā Gaiden 2: Tsubanari no Daikatana), in the Gangan GA online magazine. The series ran for nine chapter and was collected into three volumes.

Yen Press licensed the novels for publication in North America, and released the first volume in English on December 20, 2016. Yen Press has also licensed the Year One and Dai Katana spinoffs.

=== Manga ===
A manga adaptation by Kōsuke Kurose began serialization in the June 2016 issue of Square Enix's seinen manga magazine Monthly Big Gangan on May 25, 2016. Yen Press licensed the series at the same time as the light novels, and are simulpublishing the chapters in English as they are released in Japan. Artist Kento Eida launched a prequel manga, titled Goblin Slayer Side Story: Year One, in Square Enix's seinen magazine Young Gangan on September 15, 2017. As with the main manga, the prequel is simulpublished by Yen Press.

A second adaptation of the main story, this one titled Goblin Slayer: Brand New Day and illustrated by Masahiro Ikeno, was serialized in Square Enix's Monthly Big Gangan from May 25, 2018, to May 27, 2019, and was compiled into two volumes. The story adapts the fourth volume of the light novel. Yen Press also simulpublished Brand New Day. The story follows the lives of the many other characters the main series' protagonists have encountered throughout their adventures, providing background on minor characters which further explores the world that Goblin Slayer takes place in.

Takashi Minakuchi launched a manga adaptation of the Goblin Slayer Side Story II: Dai Katana novel on Square Enix's Manga Up! app and on the Gangan GA website. Three chapters were published from December 28, 2018, to April 12, 2019. The manga was canceled and rebooted under a new artist, Aoki Shogo, with the first chapter published on August 30, 2019.

A manga by Daichi Matsuse titled Goblin Slayer: A Day in the Life, adapting the twelfth volume of the light novel, was serialized in Monthly Big Gangan from December 23, 2022, to November 25, 2024, and was compiled into three volumes.

=== Anime ===
A 12-episode anime television series adaptation by White Fox premiered from October 7 to December 30, 2018, (Note: The series is listed to premiere on October 6 at 24:30, which is the same as October 7 at 12:30 AM.) and was broadcast on AT-X, Tokyo MX, Sun TV, and BS11. The series is directed by Takaharu Ozaki, with scripts penned by Hideyuki Kurata and Yōsuke Kuroda, character designs handled by Takashi Nagayoshi and music composed by Kenichiro Suehiro. The opening theme song is "Rightfully" by Mili, while the ending theme song is "Gin no Kisei" (銀の祈誓; "Silver's Oath") by Soraru. Funimation produced an English dub for the series, while Crunchyroll simulcasted the series internationally. Muse Communication licensed the series in Southeast Asia and South Asia.

The premiere of the first episode caused some controversy for its content due to the series being mis-rated as TV-PG by Crunchyroll when it first aired. Crunchyroll has since given the series a rating of TV-MA and added a content warning.

At the "GA Fes 2021" event livestream, it was announced that anime series will receive a second season. It is produced by Liden Films and directed by Misato Takada, with Ozaki serving as chief director, and Hiromi Kato designing the characters. Kurata and Suehiro are returning as scriptwriter and composer, respectively. The second season aired from October 6 to December 22, 2023. The opening theme song is "Entertainment" by Mili, while the ending theme song is "Kasumi no Mukō e" (霞の向こうへ; "To the Other Side of the Mist") by Yuki Nakashima. On October 19, 2023, Crunchyroll announced that the second season will begin airing its dub the following day.

==== Film ====
A film, titled Goblin Slayer: Goblin's Crown, with returning staff and cast, premiered on February 1, 2020.

=== Video games ===
A browser RPG game, titled Goblin Slayer – Endless Hunting, was released on the G123 game platform published by CTW on December 20, 2022.

In January 2023, Goblin Slayer Another Adventurer: Nightmare Feast was announced for Nintendo Switch and PC (via Steam). Published by Bushiroad Games and developed by Apollosoft and Mebius, it is a strategy RPG featuring an original story. The game was released in Japan on February 29, 2024, with a digital Western release on November 15.

== Reception ==
The light novel ranked fifth in 2017 in Takarajimasha's annual light novel guide book Kono Light Novel ga Sugoi!, in the bunkobon category. By July 2020, the light novel had over 7 million copies in circulation.

The first volume of the manga reached 39th place on the weekly Oricon manga rankings, selling 20,360 copies in its first week.

=== Controversy ===
Goblin Slayer features graphic violence and a dark tone, as well as depictions of sexual violence by the goblins, leading to considerable controversy.

Goblin Slayer was one of two works cited by Matt Shaheen as pornographic when justifying his efforts to lead a book ban in Texas schools. In July 2020, the manga became one of seven titles to be removed from Books Kinokuniya in Australia for claims of promoting child pornography.

== See also ==
- Blade & Bastard, another light novel series with the same author
- Magical Explorer, another light novel series with the same illustrator
