= Deemo =

2013 vertical-scrolling rhythm game

- Taiwanese PlayStation Vita cover art
- Developers: Rayark; Esquadra (NS)
- Publishers: iOS, Android: WW: Rayark Games; PlayStation Vita: JP: Rayark Games; NA: PM Studios; Nintendo Switch: WW: Circle Entertainment; JP: Flyhigh Works
- Producers: Yu Ming-Yang; Chang Hsiang; Li Yung Ting
- Engine: Unity
- Platforms: iOS, Android, PlayStation Vita, Nintendo Switch, Microsoft Windows, PlayStation 4
- Release: iOS: WW: 13 November 2013; Android: WW: 27 December 2013; PlayStation Vita: JP: 24 June 2015; NA: 16 May 2017; Nintendo Switch: JP: 21 September 2017; WW: 28 September 2017; Reborn; PlayStation 4; WW: 21 November 2019; Windows; WW: 4 September 2020; Android, iOS, Nintendo Switch; WW: 17 December 2020
- Genre: Rhythm
- Mode: Single-player

Deemo is a rhythm video game developed by Taiwanese game developer Rayark. The game was released on iOS and Android mobile platforms on 13 November 2013. An enhanced port for the PlayStation Vita, titled Deemo: Last Recital (Japanese: DEEMO～ラスト・リサイタル～), first announced late 2014, was released in June 2015. A Nintendo Switch port was released worldwide in September 2017. A remake of the entire game in 3D, titled Deemo -REBORN-, was announced in October 2017 for PlayStation 4 with PlayStation VR compatibility, and was released on 21 November 2019. A PC port was released on 4 September 2020, and a mobile port for Android and iOS was announced on 23 November 2020. On 13 January 2022, Rayark announced the release of its sequel Deemo II.

== Gameplay ==
Demonstration of the typical gameplay style of Deemo.

The core gameplay of Deemo is a score-based music video game. Each playable song features three main levels, namely Easy, Normal, Hard, each given a difficulty rating measured in a 'Level' scale. The levels were originally being ranged between 1 and 10, however the introduction of the Level 11 song Myosotis in the 2.0 version and the Level 12 song Marigold in the 3.0 version, marks the extension of the levels range, now being ranged from 1 to 12. A few selected songs also have an unlockable "Expert" difficulty which may have letters in place of the level number. The player can also customize the speed of the notes before starting a level, in a scale of 0.5 (slowest) to 9.5 (fastest). Songs can also be "autoplayed" (in the Chart Mode), which plays the song automatically but disqualifies any scores and limiting tree growth.

In each level, a black line is affixed at the bottom of the screen, and horizontal bars known as "notes" approach the line at a perspective from background to foreground. The player must tap on the notes when they reach the bottom line in time with the music, resembling playing on a piano. Black notes require the player to tap each individually, while yellow notes allow the player to slide across in a chain. Black notes with a white interior are the same as normal black notes, only representing non-piano sounds, but otherwise the same gameplay-wise. Mine notes are the opposite: the player should not tap or slide the note when they reach the bottom line.

The player's performance is judged by the accuracy at which each note is hit, where a "Charming" hit is more accurate than a normal hit. "Charming" hits are subdivided into two types, "True Charming" and "Regular Charming", where "True Charming" means hitting exactly at the bottom line. Misses are also subdivided into three types, white, red, and no glow. At the end of each level, the game shows the player's overall performance in a result screen, providing the proportion of "Charming" hits, the longest chain of consecutive successful hits (Combo), and the overall accuracy in percentage form, with 100% denoting all hits are "Charming". The result screen will congratulate the player for hitting all notes successfully (Full Combo) or achieving 100% accuracy (All Charming). Hitting all notes with a "True Charming" is called 理論値.

The player's performance may also be judged by the "Energy", which starts at 100% in the beginning of the song. All types of hits (True Charming, Regular Charming, Normal) increase the Energy, white-glow Misses neither increase nor decrease the Energy, while red- and no-glow Misses decrease the Energy. The song is automatically failed when the Energy is empty at any time during the song. If there is a certain amount of Energy remaining at the end of the song, the song is cleared. One achievement in Deemo Reborn, called "I Miss You", requires a player to clear a song with all Misses. This means, a player should obtain as many white-glow Misses as possible while not obtaining any type of hits.

=== Playable songs ===
Deemo uses both instrumental and vocal music to accompany its rhythm game elements. The selection consists of works from composers from multiple regions including Taiwan, Japan, South Korea, and Hong Kong. Notable contributors include Earthbound Papas and guitarist Shinichi Kobayashi. Deemo also uses songs that were used in Cytus, another rhythm game by the same developer and songs from Alim's Role-playing game Brave Frontier for the game's collaboration event.

== Plot ==
The game's plot centers around a little girl named Alice who falls from an open trapdoor in the sky and a mysterious black being named Deemo, who, to help the girl return to her own world, plays piano music so that a special tree sapling sprouting from the piano will grow. As the tree grows, various rooms of the structure open for Alice to explore. She also encounters a person wearing a white gown and mask, referred to as the "Masked Lady", who expresses annoyance towards Deemo and the girl trying to grow the tree.

When the tree stops growing at a height of 20 meters, Alice discovers a stairway through a painting in the side room and walks into it with Deemo. The stairway leads to a chamber with another piano covered in thick thorns. As Deemo plays that piano, large-scale tremors occur and the tree resumes growth.

The tree stops growing again at a final height of 50 meters, and a final room is unlocked. As the girl and Deemo enter the thorny room, the Masked Lady grabs hold of Alice and the two struggle. Deemo stops the Masked Lady with pats on her head, and proceeds into the room with Alice, leaving the Masked Lady behind.

The final room contains a piano and a hovering platform. Deemo plays more piano music which builds a stairway to reach the platform. When the stairway is complete, Deemo walks up to a platform with Alice and raises her onto it, then returns to the piano to play one final tune. The playable song ends with the message "Goodbye, my beloved sister, Alice.", suggesting the girl's name.

As the song finishes, Deemo is revealed to be a manifestation of Alice's elder brother Hans, and gradually disintegrates. A series of flashbacks reveals that the siblings were involved in a fatal traffic accident in which Hans sacrificed himself to save Alice. Alice bursts into tears as the platform rises towards the trapdoor and the Masked Lady removes her hood and mask, revealing her as another Alice (whose name was revealed to be Celia in The Last Recital) who wanted to prevent her from leaving so that they could be with Hans. As Deemo's world crumbles and he disappears, Alice wakes up in a hospital bed, attached to medical monitors. She removes them and rushes to the window to find that she has escaped Deemo's world, that she was in a coma the whole time, and that Hans died after the two of them were hit by a truck. Alice collapses into tears as nurses rush to her side to try and comfort her. After the credits, it is revealed that she takes up piano playing in his memory.

== Release ==
Deemo was released on 13 November 2013, on the App Store, and 27 December 2013, on Google Play for Android devices. Formerly, the Android version is a free trial only allowing limited progress, the full version of which can be unlocked by an in-app purchase.

Deemo: Last Recital for the PlayStation Vita was released on 24 June 2015, in Japan exclusively as downloadable software. Different from mobile releases, Last Recital included additional modes for cooperative and competitive play, and an extra story exclusive to this version. Cutscenes were remade with full animation produced by CoMix Wave Films. All lines by the little girl are voiced in Japanese by voice actress Ayana Taketatsu.

The game's ending songs are titled "Sakurairo no Yume" (桜色の夢, Sakurairo no yume; lit. Cherry-Colored Dream) by Chihiro Toki and "Alice Good Night" by Riin for the 2.0 version.

The PlayStation Vita version was distributed physically by Limited Run Games in June 2017.

On 1 September 2017, Japanese publisher Flyhigh Works announced during a live stream that Deemo would be coming to the Nintendo Switch in Japan. The port was handled by ESQUADRA and published by Flyhigh Works in Japan, similar to their previous port of Voez to Nintendo Switch.

On 17 October 2017, Unties, a new publishing label under Sony Music Entertainment Japan, and Rayark announced Deemo -REBORN- for PlayStation 4. The game is fully remade in 3D and is compatible with PlayStation VR.

Deemo has been updated in late 2018 to include limited support for the piano Toy-Con that is part of the Nintendo Labo line.

== Reception ==
Reception

Aggregate score
Aggregator	Score
Metacritic	NS: 88/100; PS4: 75/100

Review score
Publication	Score
TouchArcade	iOS: 4.5/5

Rayark claims that Deemo saw 200,000 downloads within one month of release, and 7 million downloads as of October 2014, ranking first in the music game genre in the App Store of over 100 regions. At the time of the anime adaption's announcement in 2021, 28 million downloads of the original game were reported.

Deemo received generally positive critical reviews. Smartphone game review site TouchArcade gave a 4.5-star rating, citing "the game's art style and subtle story meld together beautifully to create an overall presentation that simply works". A Kotaku review praises the story delivering spectrum of emotions while accompanied by a fitting soundtrack, akin to "the rhythm game equivalent of musical theater". Last Recital for PlayStation Vita received a 33/40 Famitsu Score (8/8/9/8).

Deemo was nominated "Best of 2013" in the independent developer division by the App Store's Taiwan division. The game was later named "Best Game Music" by Google Play's Taiwan market editorial.

The playable song I Race the Dawn won the Outstanding Achievement – Vocal Theme award at the 2013 Annual Game Music Awards by Game Music Online.

== Media ==
=== Theatrical film ===
A theatrical film adaptation of the game titled Deemo: Memorial Keys (Japanese: DEEMO サクラノオト -あなたの奏でた音が、今も響く-, Hepburn: Deemo Sakura no Oto – Anata no Kanadeta Oto ga, Ima mo Hibiku) was announced by Rayark in November 2019. It was released on 25 February 2022, after being postponed from a planned 2020 release due to the ongoing COVID-19 pandemic. The film is animated by Production I.G and Signal.MD, and directed by Shūhei Matsushita, with Jun'ichi Fujisaku serving as executive director. Fujisaku and Bun'Ō Fujisawa are handling the series' composition, while Mebachi is designing the characters. Yuki Kajiura will compose the film's theme song.

=== Manga ===
A manga adaptation based on the game will be serialised on Ichijinsha's manga magazine ZERO-SUM by artist Niwa Haruki.
