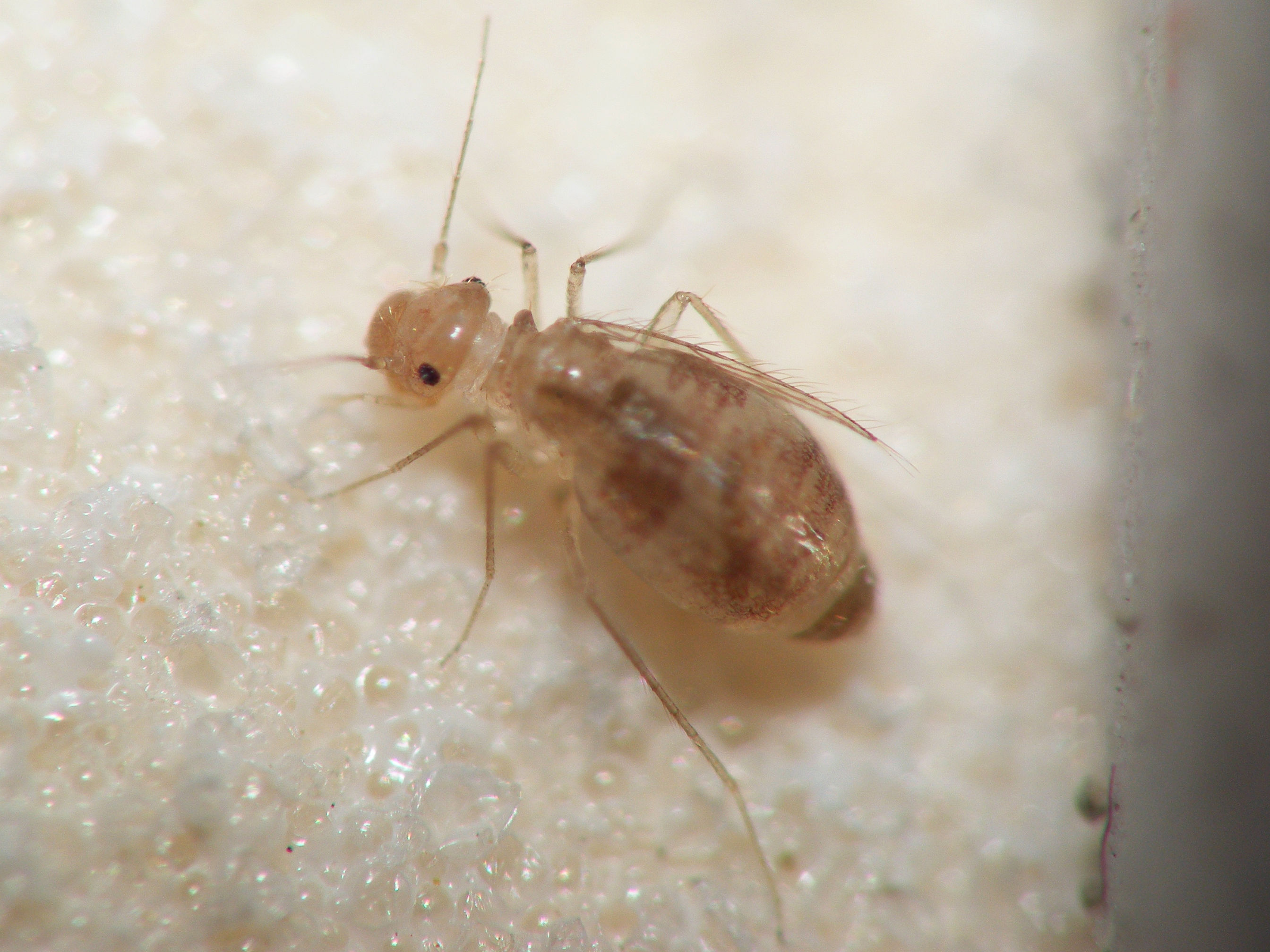
- Dorypteryx domestica

Scientific classification
- Kingdom: Animalia
- Phylum: Arthropoda
- Clade: Pancrustacea
- Class: Insecta
- Order: Psocodea
- Suborder: Trogiomorpha
- Infraorder: Psyllipsocetae
- Family: Psyllipsocidae; Lienhard & Smithers, 2002

= Psyllipsocidae =

Psyllipsocidae Temporal range: Barremian–Recent

Family of booklice

Psyllipsocidae is a family of cave barklice in the order Psocodea. There are about 7 genera and more than 70 described species in Psyllipsocidae.

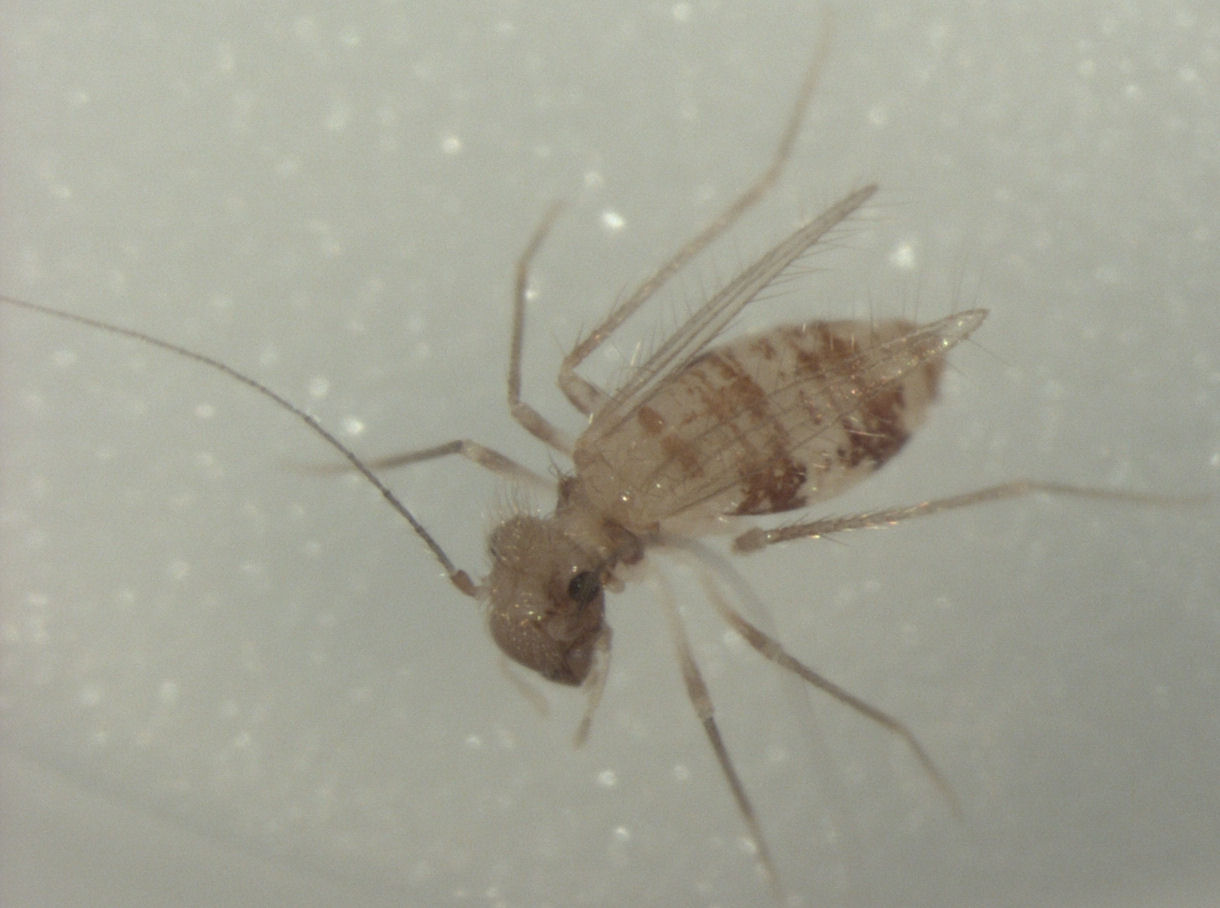
Dorypteryx longipennis

== Genera ==
These eight genera belong to the family Psyllipsocidae:

- † Annulipsyllipsocus Hakim, Azar, Maksoud, Huang & Azar, 2018 Burmese amber, Cenomanian
- † Libanopsyllipsocus Azar and Nel, 2011 Lebanese amber, Barremian
- † Concavapsocus Wang et al, 2019 Burmese amber, Cenomanian
- Dorypteryx Aaron, 1883
- † Khatangia Vishnyakova, 1975 Taimyr amber, Santonian
- Pseudopsyllipsocus Li, 2002
- Pseudorypteryx Garcia Aldrete, 1984
- Psocathropos Ribaga, 1899
- Psyllipsocus Selys-Longchamps, 1872
