= Voez =

2016 video game

- Cover for the Nintendo Switch port of the game in Japan
- Developers: Rayark; Esquadra (NS)
- Publishers: WW: Rayark (iOS, Android); NA: PM Studios; JP: Flyhigh Works (NS); WW: Circle Entertainment (NS)
- Engine: Unity
- Platforms: iOS, Android, Nintendo Switch
- Release: iOS: WW: 26 May 2016; Android: WW: 2 June 2016; Nintendo Switch: JP: 3 March 2017; PAL: 3 March 2017; NA: 9 March 2017
- Genre: Rhythm
- Mode: Single Player

Voez (stylized as VOEZ) is a rhythm game developed by Rayark, initially released in May 2016 for iOS devices, while an Android version of the game was released one week later in June 2016. In February 2017, it was announced that the game would be released on the Nintendo Switch by Japanese game publisher Flyhigh Works, and was released in March 2017 worldwide.

== Gameplay ==
The user interface while playing a song, showing Max Perfect (left) and Perfect (right) hit notes

In each level, there is a black horizontal line at the bottom of the screen, as notes fall down from the top of the screen on the note line. The note line can move horizontally depending on the song and its chosen difficulty. The player must either tap, hold, slide or swipe the note depending on which note it is.

Tap notes must be tapped when they reach the horizontal line to make them disappear. Hold notes are long notes that must be held on until the note ends. Swipe notes must be swiped in a specific direction to make them disappear, while slide notes require the player to hold their finger on the horizontal line and slide it to where the next white note will fall to so the note can disappear.

A score is given based on the performance of how accurate each note is hit. The accuracy of each note is judged by either as 'Max Perfect', 'Perfect', 'OK' or 'Miss'. The total score will also show a letter grade: an S rating from 950,000 points or when player receives a title, an A rating from 880,000 points, a B rating from 780,000 points, and a C rating for any lower score. There is a combo counter which keeps count of how many notes have been hit without missing. Hitting all the notes can reward the player with a title of 'Full Combo', and there is further reward by hitting every note at 'Perfect' or 'Max Perfect' accuracy, rewarding the player with an 'All Perfect' title.

Each song has three difficulty levels—Easy, Hard and Special. The difficulty of a song is also given a numerical rating, with the higher the rating, the more difficult the song is. The player can also decide how fast the music notes will fall.

VOEZ currently features more than 200 songs to play from a variety of genres, including as eurodance, synthpop, trance music, electronic music, pop music and more. The music comes from the East Asian indie artist and composers (Hong Kong, China, Macau, Taiwan, South Korea and Japan).

== Plot ==
An in-game diary serves as the means to give the player challenges to unlock each story episode. Each episode contains parts of the story and artwork. The player can also find out more about each episode on the official website.

The first ten episodes introduces each character and the setting of each location of the story. During the introduction, Lance quickly sneaks out of He Sheng Bakery to avoid work, leaving his sister Chelsea to do his part of the work. Ocean helps his father on his work in fixing cars at the garage, while Qian Qian works at Ocean Breeze Music, where they sell instruments and offer services such as teaching lessons and school clubs. Yuko Sasaki, as the class leader of Class 2.2, comes in to help Chelsea so that the class can decide what to do for a fair event. Chelsea and Ocean are classmates in Class 2.2.

For the school fair, Class 2.2 decides on the Maid Café while Class 2.3, which includes Qian Qian and Jessy, take part in a fun activity which uses big inflatable hammers to hit the class members with mole rat hat. The school also has an annual talent show, where Chelsea shows her talents in singing despite being initially nervous on stage. Jessy and Ocean also show their talents in playing the guitar in an improvised performance with someone playing the piano.

During the summer holidays, Chelsea, Qian Qian, Yuko, Ocean and Jessy spends one of their days to supposedly to do summer vacation homework at VOEZ Café but they end up having an outdoor barbeque instead. Chelsea goes to find wood to use as firewood but ends up getting lost in the forest. Everyone begins to look for her and Jessy finds Chelsea's phone on the ground. It begins to rain, and Chelsea gets lost in the woods for about 30 minutes before she manages to leave and head towards a small building. Ocean searches through the forest and manages to find a small temple, where he finds Chelsea. At the end of chapter 2, everyone is shown at the beach on their summer holiday, having a fun time and relaxing.

== Characters ==
There are several characters in the game's story, each with their own position in the VOEZ band, personality traits and their own associated colour.

- Sasaki Yuko: Born on 27 October, Yuko is the bassist of the VOEZ band. She is half Japanese, half Chinese and moved to Lan Kong with her father during high school, where she met Chelsea and Ocean and was recruited into the band. Her specialty is her entertainment industry connections, which she uses to help the band from a management perspective. Her associated colour is red.
- Chelsea: Born on 7 July, Chelsea is the female lead vocal of the band. She works with her parents in the local bakery, and is known to have a great enthusiasm for helping others. Lance is Chelsea's younger brother. Her associated colour is orange.
- Lance: Born on 16 December, Lance plays the drums in the band. Even though he excels academically, he is not known for taking many things seriously. After encouragement from Qian Qian, he joined the band and put more focus on his musical talents. Chelsea is Lance's older sister. His associated colour is yellow.
- Ocean: Born on 22 August, Ocean is the guitarist of the band. Raised solely by his father, he is fond of helping him when he can. He spent some time before the current iteration of the band in a duo with Jessy. His associated colour is green.
- Jessy: Born on 13 January, Jessy is the second guitarist of the band, as well as providing the band's lead male vocals. Originally from the United States of America, Jessy moved to Lan Kong while he was still young, where he met Ocean, and they formed a two-man band. He is generally level-headed and calculated. His associated colour is blue.
- Qian Qian: Born on 9 October, Qian Qian plays the keyboard in the band, having learned through playing the piano from a young age. Described as kind, but quiet and reserved, she helped bring the members of the band together due to her keen eye for the talents of others. Her associated colour is indigo.

== Release ==
VOEZ was released on 26 May 2016 on the App Store for iOS devices and 2 June 2016 on Google Play for Android devices. The game is free to play and it features optional in-app purchases which allows users to purchase keys to unlock songs. These keys can also be earned through gameplay. The game also features a free song rotation system which changes the song from being free to paid and vice versa at a certain date. The game was released for the Nintendo Switch in Japan and Europe on 3 March 2017, and in North America on 9 March 2017. As the game was initially still reliant on touch controls, it was incompatible with the Nintendo Switch's TV mode functionality and could not be played with button controls, though the update for version 1.3.1 added controller support and TV mode functionality. For the Switch, the game was made full-priced, but with no in-game purchases, so every song in the game is unlocked from the start. This version also removed the requirement to play online from the iOS/Android version. On 10 April 2018, VOEZ was removed from the Nintendo Switch eShop in North America, but it was later resubmitted.

The game is continually updated with new playable songs, including Shovel Knight music for example. The Switch also still got an updated version, which received its first major content update in June 2017. A physical retail release for VOEZ in Japan was released in January 2018.

== Reception ==
Reception

Aggregate score
Aggregator	Score
Metacritic	iOS: 90/100; NS: 81/100

Review score
Publication	Score
TouchArcade	iOS: 4.5/5

3 weeks after the game's debut, Rayark claimed there were more than 3 million total downloads of the app, with up to 900 thousand users playing daily.

VOEZ received mainly positive reviews. Smartphone game review site TouchArcade gave a rating of 4.5 stars, stating "the game shines because of the way it does the core mechanics so well". Gaming review site GameZebo gave a rating of 4.5 stars, praising the visuals of the game and how it affects the player's experience, citing "they're also very clean and crisp. There's also a real feeling of energy to everything as columns move."

Reviewing the Switch version, Ryan Craddock of Nintendo Life gave the game a "great" 8 out of 10, calling it "a beautiful rhythm game... that makes you want to keep going back for more." However, he did criticise the "quite repetitive" nature of the songs, while stating that the quality of the sound could be improved.

Additional reviews from The Game Deflators came in at Deflated for its visuals and low cost entry point to play.

During a presentation in December 2017, Flyhigh Works confirmed that the Nintendo Switch port has been downloaded 50,000 times worldwide.
