= Cytus =

Rhythm video game series

- Developer: Rayark
- Publisher: Rayark
- Director: Yung-Ting Li
- Producer: Ming-Yang Yu
- Engine: Unity
- Platforms: iOS, Android, PlayStation Vita (PlayStation Mobile), Nintendo Switch
- Release: iOS: 12 January 2012; Android: 13 April 2012
- Genre: Rhythm game
- Mode: Single Player

Cytus is a rhythm game series developed by Rayark, a Taiwanese indie game studio. The first installation, Cytus, was released in January 2012 as a mobile game, and ported to PlayStation Vita and Mobile as Cytus: Lambda, in June 2013. A planned arcade version, Cytus: Omega, was announced in 2015 as co-developed with Capcom, and ultimately cancelled in 2018. The sequel, Cytus II, was released in 2018, and a remake for Nintendo Switch was released in April 2019 as Cytus Alpha (Cytus α).

== Gameplay ==
Demonstration of the typical gameplay style of Cytus II. This is also retroactively applicable to the original Cytus.

The gameplay of Cytus relies on Active Scan Line, which moves up and down across the screen. The player must tap circular objects, known as Notes, as the Active Scan Line passes over them, following the music. Different types of notes are used: Click Note (a single circular note, that requires tapping the object in time), Drag Note (a continuous track of notes, that requires dragging along the track), and Hold Note (has an extended ribbon meter, requires the note to be held until the meter is filled).

The notes to be hit as the line rises are colored blue and purple (light green in Cytus II), while those as the line falls are colored yellow and green (light blue in Cytus II). Each note provides a score based on its accuracy, which can be "Perfect", "Good", "Bad" or "Miss!". Hitting consecutive notes in a row with either a "Good" or "Perfect" rating will result in a combo, which provides a score boost that increases as the combo rises. At the end of a song, the player is given a score out of 1,000,000, with a minimum of 700,000 required to clear it. The player also receives a letter grade: "Fail" if a song isn't cleared, C at 700,000 points, B at 800,000 points, A at 900,000 points, S at 950,000 points, and Million Master at the maximum 1,000,000.

There is a secondary scoring system, "Technical Points" or "TP". This introduced a new, stricter rating known as a "Rainbow Perfect" denoted by a rainbow outline on the disappearing note effect. TP is calculated purely on note accuracy and is given as a percentage.

Each song has two difficulty levels—Easy and Hard, with a difficulty rating from 1 to 9. Cytus II has three to six difficult levels—Easy, Hard, Chaos, Glitch, Crash, and Dream—with difficulty ratings ranging from 1 to 16. The player may also choose how the notes fade in and toggle tap effects.

The story of Cytus spans 10 main chapters as well as a prologue, and is told through various cutscenes.

== Plot ==
=== Cytus ===
The story of Cytus is carried through its 10 main chapters as well as a prologue. The story is told in-game through various cutscenes that are unique to the chapter title songs; individual songs within each chapter are at most only marginally relevant to the plot, except for a limited few. The plot features the disaster and the protagonist's struggle with identity.

The story revolves around the protagonist, Vanessa, who lives in a 22nd-century world where robots with human memories are the only things remaining while the other living humans are killed by a mutant alien virus that came from outer space. Later, she determined that she was one of person who entered memory transfer services powered by ExtenLife to extend their life and live with her loved ones. The transfer is interrupted due to limited memory space and her emotions are corrupted. As human emotions are stored in the form of music in "Cytus"; by playing the songs, the robots can revive their human emotions. When she revives it, she is sad about it. She tries to write a mini program with Lua to delete her emotions from their memory and starts to travel around the node to delete the emotions from the other robots called "The Operators". While traveling, she found the cyro-pods that store the living humans who survived the alien virus by freezing themselves into the pods. Vanessa tries to awaken the freezing humans and give them a mission to rebuild human society again.

=== Cytus II ===
Cytus II, the sequel to Cytus, takes place about seven hundred years after the establishment of the new human society called "The New Age (N.A.)" (as the ending of Cytus). And established A.R.C. to create a virtual Internet space called Cytus (stylized as cyTus). As more and more people used the virtual internet, more and more musicians held concerts on iM, a social networking service. One musician, Aesir (stylized as Æsir), decided to hold a large virtual concert in Node 08, one of the many nodes in Cytus. Attendees of the event included Paff (stylized as PAFF), a popular singer, Neko Asakura (stylized as NEKO#ΦωΦ), a famous streamer on iM, and Robo Head (stylized as ROBO_Head), an AI robot. A bunch of top musicians performed, but the organizer, Aesir, was nowhere to be seen, even after the end of the event. By browsing through iM and each character's private "OS logs", players can unlock new songs and gain insight into the story of Cytus.

Later, Paff and her media company, Monophonic Entertainment, announced the date for her annual event, PAFFCON. Tickets for her event sold out quickly. At the event, while Paff was performing Gravity, a song that she performed in Aesir Fest, she collapsed and was sent to the hospital, where she woke up a few days later and started recovering.

While Paff was in the hospital, one of Neko's streams got hacked and DDoS attacked by Aesir. Neko was arrested by Node 08's Administration Bureau because she was suspected of launching a widespread attack on her fans. Meanwhile, Robo Head later discovers that his memory of Aesir was corrupted, and starts data recovery. People wanted to know who was responsible for the hacking. After Robo Head completes data recovery, he learns that Aesir did show up at the event and that they wiped everyone's memory of Aesir after he finished performing, and this is the same attack method on the Neko hacked streams.

Soon after, a new band, Crystal Punk, created their new account and hosted their first major event. Paff was originally going to attend, but her health did not improve. Neko was acquitted a few weeks later by the Administration Bureau. Paff left the hospital and was reported missing by Monophonic Entertainment. Her real identity, Aroma White, was also released by the company. This sparked protests outside of Monophonic's headquarters regarding the location of Paff. The lead singer of Crystal Punk, Cherry, was inadvertently injured while entering the building's headquarters. Cherry was discharged from the hospital a few days later.

One afternoon, while walking home from school, Neko encounters Paff outside of her home on a rainy day. Neko decides to take Paff in and protect her. Paff was missing for two weeks. Cause Monophonic Entertainment breaks up on her contracts. Neko's fans and family members grew suspicious that she was hiding something. At the same time, Robo Head was analyzing memory files and eventually overwrote his "Supreme Command"—an order that he must follow, and heads back to the node where he was created, Node 03, to locate and find Nora. A few years earlier, Robo Head's supreme command was reprogrammed by Nora to prevent him from returning to Node 03 or Nora.

Not long after, the entire iM system was being affected by a data corruption bug. Eventually, iM was attacked by Aesir, preventing anyone from logging in and scrambling messages so readers could not see them. The attack led to Xenon (real name: Simon Jackson) being arrested on charges of doing everything that Aesir did: delete memories and attack the virtual Internet. Xenon pleads no contest to these charges, and he is sent to prison.

After Paff is located by her sister, Helena, Paff discovers that she has the memories of two people: Aroma White and Kaori Minamiya. Years earlier, her career started through a talent show at her school where the winner would sign a contract with an entertainment company. On the way to one of her events, she was seriously injured in a car accident. Aroma was sent to the hospital in critical condition. Noah, Helena's husband, was able to save Aroma by transplanting her memories into that of another body, Kaori. Through that, Paff could sing songs none of her family heard of, but she could not remember before the car accident. Paff goes to Node 03 along with Neko and Hayato, a reporter, to learn more about her past.

Unknown to the other characters, an Architect, or an intelligent AI android that assisted with the reconstruction of human society, attacked Neko's stream and iM. Architects also can feel emotions that humans can feel. Ivy (serial number: OPCI_2501_IV) was attempting to wake another Architect, Vanessa (serial number: OPCI_2501_V), through the Cytus platform. Ivy woke up 500 years after "the decommission", or when Architect robots were deactivated after human society was recovered from the "Ender Virus" (also known as Alien Virus from Cytus). She needed to collect memories of Ivy and Vanessa in order to wake her up. Ivy finally woke Vanessa up through OS space, a space in Cytus where people can meet and interact; however, because of a video that another Architect, Ilka, showed her before the Decommission, Vanessa's core was corrupted, changing her from thinking about helping with humanity to finding a way to end humanity. Ivy wants to find a way to save Vanessa.

After Ivy establishes contact with Vanessa, she encounters and captures Noah and asks him to transfer Vanessa's memories to that of an empty Architect unit to attempt to wake her up. Noah is unsuccessful and injured, and the empty unit is damaged beyond repair. As a safety measure, Ivy sets up a firewall in an attempt to prevent Vanessa from hacking or compromising any other Internet-connected devices.

Meanwhile, two members of Crystal Punk, Cherry and ConneR, break Xenon out of jail. In Node 03, Paff and Neko encountered Robo Head and met Nora. Nora is the leader of Kyuu Hou Hai, one of many gangs that prevail in Node 03. Nora explained to Paff that she has the ability to see into OS space. Nora had used this ability before, but it left her vision trapped in OS space, leaving her unable to see in the real world without technology. At one point, when entering OS space, Paff encounters Vanessa and discovers her intent to eradicate humanity. Kyuu Hou Hai was attacked a few days later by drones. The group successfully fights off the drones, but Cherry gets shot in the process. These same drone attacks also destroyed Joe's cafe.

Cherry was placed on life support in Kyuu Hou Hai. Nora guaranteed that she would recover successfully; however, the electricity at Kyuu Hou Hai blacks out. While backup power can reenergize lights and doors, the life support Cherry is on fails, and she dies. The band she created is disbanded as none of the other members knew how to sing well.

After a successful investigation in Node 13, ConneR determined that Ivy was likely the culprit of the drone attacks. He, Nora, and the rest of the group return to Node 08 to stop the destruction of humanity. After encountering Ivy at A.R.C., a technology company, they learn that Vanessa is causing the chaos. Soon after, Vanessa hacks the weather system and reprograms it to extreme weather to spread a virus, triggering the end of humanity. Noah attempts to disrupt Vanessa's signals by sending an electric shock to damage the robots, electrocuting himself in the process. Ivy successfully goes into the Library at A.R.C. and successfully encounters Vanessa following the advice of another Architect, Rin, to talk to her calmly to snap Vanessa out of the attitude of desiring to destroy humanity. Not long after, the A.R.C. Armed Forces find Ivy and kill her, forcing Paff, Neko, Nora, Xenon, ConneR, Robo Head, and the player into a final battle to inject a virus that they created earlier through OS space into Vanessa, ultimately killing her and restoring the peace that precedes. During the final battle, Paff calls out to the player for help sharing the burden of the virus in OS space. But they fail to kill Vanessa, causing her to release the virus, which wipes out all of humanity except the players and Paff, who are immunization to the Ender Virus, and traps them into OS Space forever, and brings back the beautiful world.

However, players can change the situations, characters, and humanity's fate. In this ending, the only character the player can play is Vanessa, which forces the player to retry the climax scene.

The story has three endings, depending on the player's choices in the climax. Another two endings is Vanessa's dreams about the world that going into peace.

- If the player doesn't share the load of the virus (fails to answer Paff's call for help), Paff will die from the burden of transferring the virus and her memories to Vanessa, who comments that Paff's memories are beautiful before she dies, and Paff's sister, Helena, is left to grieve.
- If the player shares the load of the virus (accepts Paff's call for help), Vanessa is destroyed, and Paff returns to singing and accepts her dual identity as Aroma and Kaori.

In these endings, the player will find themselves awoken in a hospital three months later. A.R.C. decides to decommission the library and improve transparency. Rin breaks out of A.R.C. and starts living a normal life, blending in with the crowd and hiding the fact that she is an Architect. Joe rebuilds his cafe that was destroyed in a drone attack, Neko gives up from game streamer to walking in a musician career path and finds the foundation to help victims in Vanessa events, Xenon's sister is successfully recovered from OS space, and the world bring back into a peace without Vanessa. In a post-credit scene, Ivy can be seen damaged somewhere surrounded by a group of Architects' Units.

Before the player wakes up (in a good or neutral ending), the player still searches the OS Space and creates a new feature called Object Analysis (OA) the player can virtualize and analyze the object within the OS Space. With this ability the player seem to virtualize Paff and Vanessa in OS space by accident. With memory in OS Space and OS Log, they both knew that the players watched and read stories about their lives, including the other character that the player played. The player character is a test subject "E00200", a person who let into a secret experiment with the Ender Virus by Violette and immunized to the virus. But it causes you to fall into a coma for a long time and your consciousness is still driving into the OS space for 10 years (since the release of the first Cytus game). While in this state, you can travel forward, and backward, move around the timeline, watch everyone, read files, log in, interfere with the virtual internet, and develop a new ability called "Eye of Horus", an ability that can connect to the OS Space from the real world. However, your travel in OS Space its cause you to lose your memory and any emotions that humans have.

They told you that the event of three endings is just a simulation and they have the "truth" you're looking for. The truth reveals the reason why the player is inside the game is because you've watched Paff's iM log-in scene, which brings us inside the game. Is this the truth we are looking for? Are we satisfied with that? After that, the emotions of the player it's now recovered and translated into music Incyde (by YbeLL) they know that you're feeling everything. After the song ends, Paff just asks that question that you saw in the first scene again. And now you can answer it was "Who am I?".

PAFF and Vanessa told to players that the future is in our hands and we can change it, and it will be a "new beginning" of Cytus's world.

Weeks after the event of the Architect Awakening Incident, people split into two groups. One stands for shutting down the A.R.C., the Cytus, and the virtual internet. While the other group stands for reviving of Cytus. Vicky, the reporter of 08 Daily has traveled around the Node to interview citizens about the event. But when she starts to go live from the memorial to the victims in Node 08, Vicky's interview is interrupted by protesters to publicize their broadcast in iM to show the darkest side of A.R.C, the Cytus, and the Architects.

During the broadcast, there are calls from an unknown person who used their identity as ?????. And the call is ringing to E00200 in the OS Space too. The Call explained that the World is live longer than the citizen can't imagine, but this World has faced the chaos created by the Ender. Humanity was fallen and they created the Architects to live on. But they receive a second chance. Survival is just to give the mission to rebuild humanity again which is called the New Age. They also said that the event of the Architect Awakening Incident was some chaos created by humans. And the chaos like this will never end. Because A.R.C. just found a way to use the broken architects to restart Cytus again. And this thing will happen again or not. As humanity moves forward, the minds of the architects will move to the end too. The Call to the public ends here. In the credits roll, E00200 will see that the people who watched the broadcast are also talking about this topic until one message that E00200 received "What will you choose..?".

After that, the call is call to E00200 to choose the last thing that you want to know:

- If the player accepts the contacts, the call will simulate the scene where Ivy and Vanessa live happily in their afterlife. Before the signal is cut with the command "Wake Up. Ivy.".
- If the player doesn't accept the contacts, the call will show the memory recovery process. When complete, the command "Wake Up. Ivy." is sent to Ivy remains. And she starts moving her hand again.

==== Voice cast ====
- Sumire Uesaka as PAFF / Aroma White / Kaori Minamiya, an introverted popular idol from Node 08 who has a split past that resulted from an operation performed after a severe car accident.
- Yumiri Hanamori as Neko Asakura, a popular live streamer from Node 08 who enjoys gaming and gossip on the iM platform.
- Tomokazu Seki as Xenon / Simon Jackson, a former A.R.C. administrator known for his hacking abilities and his musical ability in the band Crystal Punk.
- Eiji Takeuchi as ConneR / Colin Neumann, Jr., a researcher and musician who is interested in archaeology.
- Ai Fairouz as Cherry, the lead singer of the Cherry Punk band.
- Manaka Iwami as Nora, the creator of Robo Head and the leader of Kyuu Hou Hai, who possesses the ability to view electronic signals in OS space. She is unable to communicate in the real world or move around without the assistance of technology.
- Maki Kawase as Ivy (OPCI_2501_IV), an Architect who looked for ways to wake Vanessa up after being shut down for several centuries due to the Decommission.
- Tomori Kusunoki as Vanessa (OPCI_2501_V), an Architect acquainted with Ivy whose malfunction results in actions meant to the end of humanity.
- Mamiko Noto as Rin (OPCII_0584_X), an Architect who is employed at A.R.C.

=== Playable songs ===
Cytus includes 210 songs available for play in the game, spanning a variety of genres, including pop music, trance music, and drum and bass. The music is composed and performed by independent composers and artists from Taiwan, Hong Kong, Japan, South Korea, and the United States. Vocaloid engines are also used. A number of songs also have an alternate version(s) in addition to the normal version. These can be called upon by interacting with the song artwork in the song selection screen. Gestures used include tapping, swiping, and holding at a specific timing and location.

Cytus also includes a series of songs in the image of the overarching plot, collectively named Cytus: Alive, added in version 6.0 in July 2014. Unlike normal songs, Cytus: Alive songs contain added plot animation during gameplay.

== Releases and pricing ==
Cytus is available through the Apple App Store and Google Play. The full game charges a base price plus optional in-app purchases for players to purchase additional chapters of playable songs.

The release on Google Play is free but features a cooldown timer before starting each song. The cooldown is removed when the full price is paid.

The PlayStation Vita and PlayStation Mobile port Cytus: Lambda includes the then-exclusive chapter Prologue: Live, otherwise identical to its smartphone releases. A teaser video was released on YouTube before release on 7 June 2013. This version has since been made unavailable with the shutdown of PlayStation Mobile.

Cytus α, a remake of the game for the Nintendo Switch, was released on 25 April 2019. This version, along with a revamped interface, added two new chapters, extra story elements, and an online Battle Score mode.

=== Million Downloads Plan ===
Rayark Games announced the Million Downloads Plan (Chinese: 百首新歌，百萬下載; lit. 'hundred new songs', 'million downloads') in the wake of "illegal piracy harming the sales figures of Cytus". Starting from Version 2.0.0, a 10-song chapter would be made available to all players for free for each 100,000 paid downloads achieved, up to a million paid downloads or ten chapters. The plan is completed with Version 8.0, released in July 2015, opening ten chapters for free, including the special Chapter Million featuring remixes of past songs.

== Reception ==
=== Cytus ===
Reception (Cytus)

Review score
| Publication | Score |
|---|---|
| TouchArcade | 4/5 |

As of April 2021, Cytus ranks #8 in the iOS App Store's "Music" category in the United States.

Smartphone game reviewer TouchArcade gave the game 4 stars out of 5, saying that "the gameplay is pretty simple, but well executed", though noting it lacked a health system and had fairly loose hit detection.

=== Cytus α ===
Reception (Cytus α)

Aggregate score
| Aggregator | Score |
|---|---|
| Metacritic | 81/100 |

Review scores
| Publication | Score |
|---|---|
| IGN | 8.5/10 |
| Nintendo Life | 8/10 |

Cytus α received mostly positive reviews. Ryan Craddock of Nintendo Life gave the game a "great" 8 out of 10, praising the game's mechanics as "something particularly satisfying about dancing around the screen playing a musical version of whack-a-mole", but that its higher price compared to Rayark's other titles Deemo and Voez meant that "Rayark has almost shot itself in the foot with its previous releases." Shigeta Yuichi from IGN Japan gave the game an 8.5 out of 10, noting the Battle Mode's low player base and inability to search for friends, yet one that he could still "wholeheartedly recommend to new players".

== Controversy ==
=== Censorship in China ===
In 2020, Cytus II was temporarily banned in China following a discovery that one of their composers had written (privately and with no connection to Cytus II or Rayark, Inc.) a song with a hidden pro-Hong Kong protests message, written in morse code. The artist quickly resigned as they did not want the game and the company to be connected to their song. The Rayark CEO was also forced to condemn the actions of the composer in question.

== Other media ==
=== Soundtrack ===
Multiple Cytus soundtracks have been released both on iTunes and as physical CDs, featuring playable music and background composition from the game. Cytus -Prologue-, was released on 1 April 2012, Cytus -Hindsight- on 10 December 2013 and Cytus -Foresight- on 28 December 2013. A story album called Cytus -Alive- has also been released on 20 August 2012; the album features songs composed by Sta and Cranky with the same names as the ten chapters of the game. Each song corresponds to each chapter in the story plot.

The Cytus II soundtrack consists of music by indie composers from the United States, Japan, South Korea, and Taiwan. Notable collaborations in the game include those with Hatsune Miku and Kizuna AI.

=== Code: Cytus ===
Code: Cytus (Chinese: 柯基托斯) is a multimedia video game music stage production based on the story of Cytus, produced by Divertimento Media (Chinese: 樂乎乎工作坊) as commissioned by Quanta Arts Foundation (Chinese: 廣藝基金會). The production ran four shows in November 2014 in Taiwan.
