= List of Tokyo Mew Mew characters =

The five girls who make up Tokyo Mew Mew as seen in their Cafe Mew Mew uniforms in the anime adaptation. From left to right: Ichigo Momomiya, Zakuro Fujiwara, Bu-Ling Huang, Retasu Midorikawa, and Minto Aizawa.

The Tokyo Mew Mew manga and anime series features a cast of characters designed by Mia Ikumi. The series takes place in Tokyo, Japan, where five adolescent girls, called Mew Mews, are infused with the DNA of endangered species to combat aliens attempting to take over the Earth. The manga series is followed by a short sequel series, Tokyo Mew Mew a la Mode, which introduces a new Mew Mew and a new threat.

The Mew Mews are led by the main character, Ichigo Momomiya, whose first task is to gather the other four Mew Mews: Minto Aizawa, Retasu Midorikawa, Bu-Ling Huang, and Zakuro Fujiwara. As the series progresses, Ichigo goes from having a crush on Masaya Aoyama to becoming his girlfriend while trying to hide her secret double life from him. The series antagonists include three aliens, Quiche, Pie, and Tart, and their leader, Deep Blue. Originally from Earth, the aliens were forced to leave long ago due to deadly environmental changes. They have returned to kill the humans, who they feel are destroying their planet, and reclaim the planet. In a la Mode, middle school student Berry Shirayuki is introduced as the sixth Mew Mew and, in the absence of Ichigo, the temporary leader of the Mew Mews. A la Mode also introduces a new set of antagonists, the Saint Rose Crusaders, a group of human teenagers with various psychic abilities with a desire to create their own utopia. Led by Duke, they make several attempts to kill Berry, eventually turning the local populace against the Mew Mews.

Ikumi's initial vision for Tokyo Mew Mew was a story called Tokyo Black Cat Girl that featured a cat-girl battling alien invaders. After the story was transitioned to a more upbeat story of five female superhumans, the character designs were redone to have a lighter, more colorful feel. The main series characters were praised for being a perfect fit for the overall story, as well as for their cute appearances. The characters introduced in a la Mode were also praised for their visual appearances, but criticised as being repeats of the original series.

== Creation and conception ==
Mia Ikumi spent a year designing the Tokyo Mew Mew manga before the release of the first volume in February 2001. The story she originally presented to her editors, Tokyo Black Cat Girl, featured a heroine named Hime Azumi who is given the ability to transform into a cat-girl by an intergalactic police officer named Masha. He then asks her to aid him in defeating alien invaders called the Baku using her new powers. Azumi agrees, while trying to keep her new double life secret from her crush. After the production team decided to focus on five female superhumans, Ikumi was asked to reconstruct the lead character and the darker Hime Azumi was changed into the brighter and more colorful Ichigo. She had reservations about the changes, as the character was originally designed for a more dramatic series.

Ikumi created other girl–animal combinations while designing the four other Mew Mews, including a mouse girl with the same green coloring as Retasu. However, the mouse design was one of several designs rejected for use in the series as the choices were narrowed down. Once the main Mew Mew designs were finalized, Ikumi named them after various foods: Ichigo (Strawberry), Minto (Mint), Retasu (Lettuce), Bu-Ling (Pudding), and Zakuro (Pomegranate). During one of the project meetings, an unnamed editor remarked that the names might be hard to remember and suggested naming the characters after various colors instead, but the food names were kept. Although Ikumi initially suggested calling Ichigo's main attack "Strawberry Bell Bell" as a joke, the editorial team thought it was funny and kept the name. Ikumi noted that future attack names were decided by which sounded funniest. The only character from Ikumi's Tokyo Black Cat Girl to retain his original name and general appearance was Masha, but his gender was changed to female in Tokyo Mew Mew.

Mari Kitayama adapted the character designs from Ikumi's original artwork for the anime adaptation. Ikumi stated that she approved of the character designs, and agreed with the voice actor selections.

== Mew Mews ==
The Mew Mews are quintuple young girls who have been injected with the genes of endangered species, giving them the ability to transform into Mew Mews. The project chose endangered species because they felt that these species would have the strongest desire to preserve their kind. These superheroes are biological weapons tasked with fighting the chimera anima, the monsters created when alien parasites infect a living host. They are later called on to fight the aliens that were the source of the Chimera Anima invasion. The creation of the first five Mew Mews occurred accidentally. The head of the project, Ryô Shirogane, originally intended to inject a Chimera Anima with the endangered animal genes directly to see if that would reverse the effects of the infection. Instead, it was accidentally injected into five different girls when the earthquake happened.

The Mew Project was started by Ryô's father, Dr. Shirogane, five years before Tokyo Mew Mew is set. The manga never explains why the project was started or how they knew about Chimera Animas and the aliens, but Dr. Shirogane does mention that they must learn how to inject animal genes into human DNA in order to fight the aliens. In the anime adaptation, Dr. Shirogane discovered the fossilized remains of an ancient civilization called the Chimera during an archaeological dig and began researching the race of people who lived there with his assistant Keiichirô Akasaka. This would eventually become the Mew Project. A laboratory explosion and a fire that kills Dr. Shirogane and his wife, leaving then 10-year-old Ryô orphaned. He moved back to Japan, with Keiichirô, to continue the Mew Project. According to the anime, the lab explosion was caused by a Chimera fossil that woke up setting the house on fire.

In Tokyo Mew Mew, there are five Mew Mews: Ichigo Momomiya, Minto Aizawa, Retasu Midorikawa, Bu-Ling Huang, and Zakuro Fujiwara. Each Mew Mew has a "mew mark" left on her body, identifying her as a Mew Mew. Each mark is unique to the girl but all the marks are similar, representing an aspect of their power, such as Mew Ichigo's mark located on her inner thigh being shaped like her Strawberry Bell Bell weapon and Mew Mint's being a wing symbol on her back. The girls have powers related to their animal DNA when transformed while sporting the parts of the animals. They can also boost Mew Ichigo's power by combining their powers. The group were originally called the "Mew Mews," until they were accidentally caught on live television and Mew Ichigo introduced the group to the viewers as "Tokyo Mew Mew". This became the name the public would call them thereafter. As part of being Mew Mews, the girls work as part-time waitresses at the Cafe Mew Mew, their headquarters which was a cover from where they gather information on Chimera Anima activity.

In Tokyo Mew Mew a La Mode Ichigo moves to England for a little while and a sixth Mew Mew, Berry Shirayuki, fills in for Ichigo as the leader of the Mew Mews.

=== Ichigo Momomiya ===
Ichigo Momomiya (桃宮 いちご, Momomiya Ichigo) is the series' main protagonist and the leader of the Mew Mews. She has short red hair which is usually tied up in pigtails. Ichigo (12 years old at the beginning of the series) is merged with the DNA of the Iriomote wildcat, giving her the ability to transform into Mew Ichigo, a powerful and heroic cat girl with pink hair. The transformation also causes her to exhibit various feline mannerisms while in her human form. At first, her cat ears and tail appear when she is excited, but eventually her cat DNA grows strong enough that when she kisses anything, she turns into a small black cat. She remains in a cat form until someone (human or animal) kisses her. Her ability of transforming into a cat is most likely because of her obsession towards Masaya or sometimes because of her energetic, hyperactive and short temper attitude, leading her to engage in petty arguments with her friends and allies (particularly with Minto and Ryou)

At the start of the series, Ichigo has a crush on Masaya Aoyama. Although she believes that he is oblivious to her feelings, he later returns them and they begin dating. Midway through the series, Ichigo gains a mysterious protector, the Blue Knight. Throughout the series, Ichigo repeatedly rejects repeated advances by Quiche and although she can not accept his final declaration of love, she cries over his death and holds him as he dies. Ichigo dies after transferring her own life force into Masaya after Masaya kills himself and Deep Blue. She is subsequently revived by the last of the mew aqua which was housed within Masaya. Before Masaya goes off to study abroad in England at the end of the series, Ichigo participates in a mock wedding with Masaya. Tokyo Mew Mew a La Mode reveals that Ichigo lost all of her Mew Mew powers because of the Mew Aqua's influence and joined Masaya in England, but returned to Japan when her powers began to manifest again to aid in the battle against the Saint Rose Crusaders. Her theme color is pink.

In the 2002 anime adaptation, her voice actress is Saki Nakajima. In the 4Kids Entertainment adaptation titled Mew Mew Power, her name is changed to Zoey Hanson/Mew Zoey and she is voiced by Amanda Brown. In the 2022 anime remake, her voice actress is Yuuki Temma.

=== Minto Aizawa ===
Minto Aizawa (藍沢 みんと, Aizawa Minto; Spelled "Mint" in Tokyopop volumes) is a blue-haired preteen girl who is the second Mew Mew to be introduced in the series. Infused with the genes of a Blue Lorikeet, (Note: Tokyopop translated Minto's fused species as the Ultramarine Lorikeet, however in Mew Mew Power and the Finnish adaptation of the series, it is stated to be the Blue Lorikeet, a distinct species. In Japanese materials for the series, the kana is ノドジロルリインコ, which is the kana named of the Blue Lorikeet, versus コンセイインコ which would be the Ultramarine Lorikeet.) Minto grows a bird's tail and a pair of bird wings when she transforms into Mew Mint, a powerful bluebird. Initially depicted as spoiled, snobbish, and self-centered because of her wealth due to her being born into a rich family, she is shown to be an empathetic person who cares deeply about her friends as the series progresses. In the beginning, Minto called Ichigo a vulgar person. She is a fan of Mew Mew Zakuro Fujiwara's works. and owns a pet Pomeranian named Miki. Her theme color is blue.

In the 2002 anime adaptation, Minto is voiced by Yumi Kakazu. In the 4Kids Entertainment adaptation titled Mew Mew Power, her name is changed to Corina Bucksworth/Mew Corina and she is voiced by Andi Whaley. In the 2022 anime remake, her voice actress is Mirai Hinata.

=== Retasu Midorikawa ===
Retasu Midorikawa (碧川 れたす, Midorikawa Retasu; Spelled "Lettuce" in Tokyopop volumes) is a green-haired preteen girl who is the third member of the Mew Mews formally introduced to the readers. Infused with the DNA of a Finless Porpoise, Retasu's legs can change into a porpoise's tail while she is underwater, greatly improving her swimming ability and giving her an appearance of a mermaid. In the anime adaptation, this change can only occur when Retasu is in the presence of Mew Aqua. Retasu is portrayed as a shy and intelligent character lacking self-confidence and is the subject of frequent bullying from three girls. She is afraid of her Mew Mew powers at first, causing them to go out of control at her school until she is calmed by Ichigo and Minto. The other members of the group consider Retasu to be a kind and selfless person. As the series progresses, Retasu becomes a more confident person through the other Mew Mews' regular encouragement. In the anime, Retasu has a strong love interest towards Ryou and kissed him once, that only Bu-Ling is aware of their relationship. Her theme color is green.

In the 2002 anime series, her voice actress is Kumi Sakuma. In the 4Kids Entertainment adaptation titled Mew Mew Power, her name is changed to Bridget Verdant/Mew Bridget and she is voiced by Bella Hudson. In the 2022 anime remake, her voice actress is Ryōko Jūni.

=== Bu-Ling Huang ===
Bu-Ling Huang (黄 歩鈴, Fon Purin; Chinese Pinyin: Huáng Bùlīng; Spelled "Pudding Fong" in Tokyopop volumes) is a golden yellow-haired preteen girl who is the fourth Mew Mew introduced to the readers and the youngest and shortest of the bunch. Infused with the DNA of a Golden lion tamarin, Bu-Ling grows a monkey tail and ears while transformed, and fights with a pair of rings. Bu-Ling is introduced as being a busker due to her acrobatic skills to earn money for her family. Bu-Ling can also balance and ride on a ball. The other Mew Mews agree that her monkey DNA is a perfect match for her personality as she is full of energy and loves having fun, to the point Minto considers her very immature or childish. A running gag when it comes to referencing the Mew Mews' DNA had Bu-Ling thinking that her DNA is a lion where she is always corrected that she has the DNA of a Golden Lion Tamarin. Despite her age, Bu-Ling is raising her five younger siblings (Huacha, Qingcha, Lucha, Hongcha and Heicha) and managing the family finances while their father is training in the mountains. The manga never mentions Bu-Ling's mother while the anime adaptation states that she died. Midway through the series, Bu-Ling befriends Tart when he captures her and holds her hostage. She is reluctant to fight Tart during the final battle until he affirms they have no choice, and cries over him after he is defeated. Bu-Ling kisses Tart at the end of the series and tells him she does not want it "to be goodbye." He replies by saying that he may return to see her. In the anime adaptation, the relationship between Bu-Ling and Tart is expanded and the circumstances of their initial friendship changes – instead of being saved by the Mew Mews, Tart himself saves Bu-Ling from a cavern when he realizes that she is suffocating from a lack of oxygen. Her theme color is yellow.

She is voiced by Hisayo Mochizuki in the 2002 anime. In the 4Kids Entertainment adaptation titled Mew Mew Power, her name is changed to Kikki Benjamin/Mew Kikki and she is voiced by Kether Donohue. In the 2022 anime remake, her voice actress is Rian Toda.

=== Zakuro Fujiwara ===
Zakuro Fujiwara (藤原 ざくろ, Fujiwara Zakuro; Spelled "Zacro" in Kodansha volumes) is a purple-haired teenage girl who is the fifth and last of the Mew Mews introduced and the oldest and tallest of the group. As with the others, she first appears at the endangered animal exhibit without being named. Zakuro tends to be a loner and initially refuses to join the other Mew Mews, but changes her mind after they come to her aid. Infused with the DNA of a gray wolf (the only one not Endangered but has some subspecies that are), Zakuro has a wolf tail and ears while in her Mew Mew form. Zakuro is a professional model and actress and is presented as a mature character. As her biggest fan Minto describe, Zakuro has "long, glossy, raven hair" with "dark, intelligent, yet sensitive eyes" and "long, strong and thin legs". Zakuro's background is more developed in the anime adaptation and she is said to be estranged from her family since leaving home two years earlier. She apparently had lost a man she really cared for too. Her theme color is purple.

Junko Noda provides her voice in the 2002 anime. In the 4Kids Entertainment adaptation titled Mew Mew Power, her name is changed to Renée Roberts/Mew Renée and her voice is supplied by Mollie Weaver. In the 2022 anime remake, her voice actress is Momoka Ishii.

=== Berry Shirayuki ===
Berry Shirayuki (白雪 ベリー, Shirayuki Berī) is a blonde-haired preteen girl introduced in Tokyo Mew Mew a la Mode as the sequel series' main protagonist, the sixth Mew Mew, and, while Ichigo is studying abroad, the temporary leader of the Mew Mews. She becomes the first Mew Mew to be infused with the DNA of two endangered species: the Andes Mountain Cat and the Amami Black Rabbit. Like Ichigo, she is given a robot companion, Ucha, who gives her guidance and transforms into the staff Berry uses to fight. As the "second strongest" Mew Mew, Berry becomes the primary target of the series antagonists, the Saint Rose Crusaders. Throughout a la Mode, Berry comes to realize that she is in love with her close childhood friend Tasuku, which confuses her until she is able to come to terms with her feelings. Together, they use their warm feelings of love to release the city's citizens from the Saint Rose Crusaders hypnotism and change the hearts of the Crusaders. At the end of the series, Berry and Tasuku, the "lovebirds" of the café, work side by side as the cafe's new door-to-door delivery service and celebrate being in love. Her theme color is white.

=== Ringo Akai ===
Ringo Akai (赤井 りんご, Akai Ringo) is a brown-haired preteen girl who only appears in the PlayStation game, Tokyo Mew Mew – Tojo Shin Mew Mew! – Minna Issho ni Gohoshi Suru Nyan. She is depicted as a shy, lonely girl who lives on a nature reserve with her older brother Mashiro and pet penguin Yuki, having lost her mother when she was very young. She was given a pendant made of Mew Aqua by her mother which, combined with Yuki's Humboldt penguin DNA, allows her to transform into Mew Ringo and help the other Mew Mews protect her home from the aliens. Her theme color is red and her voice actress is Taeko Kawata.

== Antagonists ==
=== Aliens ===
The primary antagonists in Tokyo Mew Mew are aliens who appear on Earth to "reclaim it". According to the aliens, their ancestors lived on Earth three million years ago, but left after a series of catastrophes nearly led to their extinction. The aliens ended up on a planet with an inhospitable surface environment and were forced to live underground by sandstorms and high temperatures. They never forgot about Earth, and when they return they are disgusted by the human inhabitants, as they feel that humans are destroying the planet. The aliens use Chimera Animas to accelerate the humans' environmental damage to destroy all life, and reclaim the planet.

Deep Blue is the first alien to return, taking the form of a human boy and going to sleep within him. Quiche, Pie, and Tart arrive later to remove humans from Earth and allow the remaining aliens to return. After Deep Blue is destroyed, and they are defeated, the aliens return to their own planet with the remaining mew aqua to change their world into a place as beautiful as Earth.

The aliens are simply called "aliens" in the manga and the original anime, but the 4Kids Entertainment adaption titled Mew Mew Power refers to this alien race as the "Cyniclons" and changes their history so that they came from an uninhabitable planet. Jealous of the humans, they wishes to make Earth their new home.

The aliens have no role in Tokyo Mew Mew a la Mode besides appearing in a single panel in the first volume of the sequel when the Mew Mews complain about the aliens having left behind some chimera animas.

==== Deep Blue ====
Deep Blue (ディープ・ブルー, Dīpu Burū) is the leader of the aliens and the overarching antagonist of the first series. He came to Earth years before the others and assumed the form of a human boy, Masaya Aoyama, to avoid detection. Deep Blue went to sleep within his new body, leaving Masaya with no memories of who or what he really is, but retaining some of Deep Blue's disgust for the way humans were treating the environment. Despite being the primary antagonist, Deep Blue does not appear until the end of the sixth volume of the manga. Deep Blue is cold natured, cruel hearted, and will kill anyone who gets in his way. Upon awakening, he attacks and injures Ichigo as he does not share Masaya's love for her, and kills Quiche without any hesitation when challenged to a duel. This allows Masaya to temporarily re-emerge and release Mew Aqua inside his body, killing them both.

The anime adaptation shows Deep Blue as a voice coming from a blue light, to whom Kisshu gives progress reports, and a shadowed version of his true form is seen when Quiche brings him some mew aqua in episode twenty-six. His death is changed in the anime to come at the hands of Mew Ichigo rather than Masaya, though Masaya aids her by taking over the body. To keep the true identity of Deep Blue a secret, his voice actor's name is shown only as a question mark until his identity is revealed in episode forty-nine; after which the credits are changed to list Megumi Ogata (who also voices Masaya and the Blue Knight). Deep Blue is one of the few characters whose name remains unchanged in the Mew Mew Power dub. The anime slightly modified his role from that of a savior for the aliens to a destructive force that wants to do nothing but destroy the Earth which causes the aliens to turn against him.

In the 4Kids Entertainment adaptation titled Mew Mew Power, he is voiced by Scottie Ray.

==== Quiche ====
Quiche (キッシュ, Kisshu) is the second of the aliens to return to Earth. Introduced at the end of the first volume of the manga, Quiche primarily acts in a playful and carefree manner, seeming to enjoying fighting with the Mew Mews and treating it like a game. Throughout the series, Quiche develops increasingly stronger feelings for Ichigo, first regarding her as an "interesting toy" (that he would kill for his leader), and obsessing over her. Quiche eventually kidnaps Ichigo, confesses his love, and then demands that she cry because he loves seeing her frightened expression. Quiche again declares his love to Ichigo towards the end of the series, but attacks and begins strangling her while crying when she rejects him again. He eventually releases her after asking how he can make her love him. Quiche is killed after turning against Deep Blue by protecting Ichigo, but is revived with the power of the Mew Aqua after Deep Blue's defeat. He returns with Pie and Tart to their planet after wishing Ichigo happiness and stealing one final kiss. The name "Kishu" or "Kisshu" is a mistranslation in the fansubs.

In the anime adaptation, his voice actor is Daisuke Sakaguchi. In the 4Kids Entertainment adaptation titled Mew Mew Power, his name is changed to Dren and he is voiced by Andrew Rannells. In the 2022 anime remake, his voice actor is Nobuhiko Okamoto.

==== Tart ====
Tart (タルト, Taruto) is one of two aliens who come to Earth to aid Quiche after Quiche continues losing to the Mew Mews. Energetic and often childish, Tart taunts Quiche for losing to the Mew Mews by saying he is weak. He primarily fights using physical attacks and chimera animals, but is also capable of manipulating plants to bind people and attacking with an energy beam. Tartu shows a distinct dislike for Ichigo and refers to her as an "old woman" when they encounter one another, only to be called a "midget" in return. Midway through the series, Tart and Pie capture Bu-Ling and hold her hostage under the Tokyo Dome. While guarding her, Tart appears to be bewildered by her refusal to be scared and her attempts to befriend him. After she is freed by the others, he laughs while looking at some candy she gave him. The anime adaptation expands this incident by having Tart save Bu-Ling's life when she starts to suffocate after the cavern is sealed off. At the end of the manga Bu-Ling kisses him and he tells Bu-Ling that he might return to get another candy drop from her, and leaves for his own world. In the anime adaptation, Tart is killed by Pie when he tries to protect the Mew Mews, and revived by the final release of Mew Aqua at the end of the series.

He is voiced by Kiyomi Asai. In the 4Kids Entertainment adaptation titled Mew Mew Power, his name is changed to Tarb (Which is brat backwards) and he is voiced by Jimmy Zoppi. In the 2022 anime remake, he is voiced by Daiki Yamashita.

==== Pie ====
Pie (パイ, Pai) comes to Earth with Tart to aid Quiche in preparing the planet of the arrival of Deep Blue. He is calm and analytical during his initial attacks on the Mew Mews, scientifically escalating the "mortality rate" of each chimera anima he sends and, when they are defeated, noting that "stronger tactics will be needed". Unlike Quiche and Tart, Pie does not outwardly express his emotions often, and rarely smiles even when taunting the Mew Mews. After Deep Blue's defeat, Pie and the others return to their world. In the anime adaptation, Pie kills Tart for his disloyalty when Tart protects the Mew Mews, but sacrifices himself to protect the Mew Mews after Deep Blue destroys their base and all of the Chimera Anima. He is revived with the final release of Mew Aqua at the end of the series.

His voice actor is Nobutoshi Kanna. In the 4Kids Entertainment adaptation titled Mew Mew Power, his name is changed to Sardon (Which is short for sardonic) and he is voiced by Pete Zarustica. In the 2022 anime remake, his voice actor is Yūichirō Umehara.

==== Chimera Animals ====
Chimera Animals (キメラ・アニマ, Kimera Anima) are blob-shaped parasitic aliens used to infect animals and change them into monsters. (Note: In the first volume of the English language release of the Tokyo Mew Mew manga, Tokyopop used the spelling "kirema anima" to refer to the monsters. In subsequent volumes and in Tokyo Mew Mew a la Mode, this is changed to chimera anima.) The Mew Mews' attacks force the parasites out of the host bodies, after which the host returns to normal and Masha retrieves the parasite by "eating" it. Although Tokyo Mew Mew does not provide any details about the chimera anima after the aliens leaves, Tokyo Mew Mew a La Mode reveals that some were left behind, and are being used by the Saint Rose Crusaders as an aid in their plans for world domination.

In the anime series, Chimera Anima also infect plants, human spirits, a fossil, and Mew Aqua.

In the 4Kids Mew Mew Power English adaptation, infected animals are called "Predasites" and the Parasite Aliens (called Para Para for short) used to infect them are called "Infusors".

=== Saint Rose Crusaders ===
The members of the Saint Rose Crusaders, as seen in the first volume of Tokyo Mew Mew a la Mode. From top left to bottom right: Royal Highness, Duke (in the hooded robe), Sweet Juliet, Blue Bayou, Happy Child.

The Saint Rose Crusaders (セント・ローズ・クルセイダーズ, Sento Rōzu Kuruseidāsu) are a group of humans acting as the primary villains in the two-volume Tokyo Mew Mew sequel, Tokyo Mew Mew a la Mode. The group comprises four teenagers and their leader Duke. In a flashback to the group's founding, Royal Highness, Happy Child, Blue Bayou and Sweet Juliet are said to have been born with varying special powers which resulted in their being shunned by other people and their families abandoning them by sending them away to a boarding school where they met. Discovering their commonality, they devise a plot to blow up the school, but a mysterious person, known only as "Duke", convinces them not to waste their lives because they were necessary to the world.

The Saint Rose Crusaders seeks to reshape the "boring grownup world" into their own utopia by using their "intelligence, philanthropy, and elegance". To do this they use the chimera anima left behind by the aliens after the events in Tokyo Mew Mew, but when the Mew Mews continue to defeat the remaining alien parasites, the Saint Rose Crusaders attention shifts to the Mew Mews' new leader, Berry Shirayuki. When their plans to capture and kill Berry Shirayuki is foiled by the other Mews, including the returned Mew Ichigo, the Saint Rose Crusaders use subliminal messages and hypnotism to turn the citizens of Tokyo, including Berry's best friend and growing crush, Tasuku Meguro, against the Mew Mews.

Each of the Crusaders features in a single major attack against Mew Berry or the other Mew Mews, before fading into the background. Towards the end of the series, Mew Berry breaks the brainwashing spell on the public. Tasuku and Duke admits that the methods the Crusaders used were wrong. They are last seen in the series standing together on the roof of a building, enjoying the warm feelings being spread by Mew Berry.

==== Duke ====
The leader of the Saint Rose Crusaders, Duke (公爵, Dyūku) is never clearly identified within the series as being male or female but it is left to the readers to decide due to the ambiguous character designed used. Reviewers of the series found it both interesting and disturbing that Duke's clothing is similar in design to the white robes worn by members of the Ku Klux Klan (an American white supremacy group once led by a man named David Duke). Within a la Mode, Duke is not shown to have any racial prejudices – Duke instead appears before four ostracized children endowed with special powers, shunned by their families and societies because they were different. Duke, drawn by their loneliness and internal cries for help, takes them in, assures them that they are important, and helps them find a purpose in life. The manga suggests that Duke came up with the plan of using the remaining Chimera Anima to take over the world.

==== Royal Highness ====
Royal Highness is the first of the Crusaders to reveal himself to the Mew Mews. He is presented as being somewhat vain about his appearance, referring to his own face as beautiful when it is scratched, and another character, Happy Child, says that Royal Highness angers very easily. Royal Highness is seen displaying powers of telekinesis in flashback sequences, though he does not use them within the main story. During the series, he is shown to be capable of mass hypnosis and as having a thirst for blood. His primarily appearance in a La Mode is to commence the first attack on Mew Berry by posing as a special lecturer, Yuzen Akizuki (秋月 友禅, Akizuki Yūzen).

==== Happy Child ====
Happy Child first shows himself to the Mew Mews when he retrieves Royal Highness. He makes his main appearance during the second attack on Mew Berry. Happy Child is able to teleport himself, float in mid-air, speak directly into other people's minds, and attack with ultra-sonic waves. In the flashback where the Crusaders first met Duke, Happy Child attempts to commit suicide by jumping off the roof. The others call out to him, using the name "Utamaro", but they are not able to stop him. Duke saves him by catching him when he goes over the roof's edge.

==== Blue Bayou ====
Blue Bayou (ブルーバユー, Burū Bayū) is the least developed of the Crusader characters. He is described as having extraordinary physical strength and is shown in a flashback cracking a wall with his fist as a child. He makes his main appearance when he teams up with Sweet Juliet for the third, and final, attack against the Mew Mews.

==== Sweet Juliet ====
Sweet Juliet (スーイトー ジュリエット, Suito Jurietto), the only Crusader whose job is mentioned, is a television drama actor. According to Blue Bayou, he is a "genius" in the field. He is shown to tune things out when he cannot understand something. For his part in the final attack on the Mew Mews, Sweet Juliet disguises himself as a female announcer named "Otome Sakuragasumi" who gives an enthusiastic report of the Mew Mews saving the day. Sweet Juliet claims to feel bad for Berry when the plan successfully causes the public to attack Berry for "making the Mew Mews evil", towards the end of the series, but he also notes that he "guesses" Berry deserves it.

== Supporting characters ==
=== Masaya Aoyama ===
Masaya Aoyama (青山 雅也, Aoyama Masaya) is Ichigo Momomiya's classmate and romantic interest. He later reveals that he shares her feelings and they begin dating. Masaya knows Mew Ichigo's real identity, but initially pretends otherwise as he knows Ichigo does not want him to know. Ichigo describes Masaya as "smart", "cute", "very athletic" and "popular at school". He is also depicted as being a polite and calm person, though he does have moments when he yells at others in anger and acts jealous and possessive regarding Ichigo. Towards the end of the series, Masaya reveals that as an orphan, he began acting like a "perfect child" to be adopted, in reality, however, he felt sick of humans and disgusted by how they treat the planet. He also reveals that Ichigo is the sole exception, and it was only with her that he felt like a "real human being". As the series progresses, it is revealed that Masaya is the Blue Knight, but that Masaya did not know that he was the Blue Knight, nor did the Blue Knight appear to have any knowledge that he was Masaya. Once Masaya becomes aware of his transformation, he realizes it was born from his desire to protect Ichigo. Shortly after this revelation, Masaya collapses and reawakens as Deep Blue, the leader of the aliens and the Mew Mew's final enemy. Deep Blue claims that he created Masaya in order to deceive the world until the time was right for his awakening. Masaya sacrifices himself by releasing the final Mew Aqua inside his body in order to stop Deep Blue and is revived when Ichigo gives her life to save him. In turn, the Mew Aqua remaining his body then saves her. At the end of the series, Masaya decides to go to England to study the endangered species used for the Mew Project, and the Mew Mews hold a mock wedding for Masaya and Ichigo before he leaves. In Tokyo Mew Mew a la Mode, Masaya is the first to sense the new danger to the Mew Mews, and he encourages Ichigo to return to help her friends. Towards the end of a la Mode, he also returns to Tokyo.

In the anime series, his voice actor is Megumi Ogata. In the 4Kids Entertainment adaptation titled Mew Mew Power, his name is changed to Mark (his last name was not revealed), and he is voiced by Scottie Ray. In the 2022 anime remake, his voice actor is Yuma Uchida.

=== Blue Knight ===
The Blue Knight (蒼の騎士, Ao no Kishi) suddenly appears at the end of the fourth volume of the manga as an unknown alien male to rescue Ichigo during a battle with Quiche. He tells Ichigo that he "is hers" and that he was "born to protect her". After his first appearance, the Blue Knight reappears whenever Ichigo is in danger to protect her, and disappears after the situation is resolved. As the series progresses, Ichigo attempts to learn his true identity and suspects both Ryô and Keiichirô, before learning near the end of the series that the Blue Knight is an alternate persona of her boyfriend, Masaya. It is revealed that this persona was created out of his desire to protect Ichigo. After his true identity is revealed, the Blue Knight, now knowing he is Masaya, fights with Mew Ichigo and the Mew Mews, and it revealed that Masaya and the Blue Knight are both alternate personalities of their worst enemy: Deep Blue. The Blue Knight disappears after Masaya transforms into Deep Blue. In Tokyo Mew Mew a la Mode, Masaya notes that he does not possess the powers he had as the Blue Knight. In the anime adaptation, the Blue Knight is given a larger role, fighting with the Mew Mews several times, advising them to the weaknesses of the monsters, and encouraging them.

His voice actor is Megumi Ogata. In the 4Kids Entertainment adaptation titled Mew Mew Power, he is one of the few characters whose original name is retained where he is voiced by Sean Schemmel. In the reboot, he is voiced by Yuma Uchida.

=== Ryô Shirogane ===
Ryô Shirogane (白金 稜, Shirogane Ryō; "Ryou" in the Tokyopop version) is a wealthy high school student, the head of the Mew Project, and the proprietor of Cafe Mew Mew. Ryô is said to be a genius in the manga and the anime say that his IQ exceeds 180. After his parents' death when he was ten, he moved back to Japan to continue his father's work with his father's assistant Keiichirô. After he finished developing the technique for injecting genes into the future Mew Mews, he first tested it on himself to ensure that the subjects would not be harmed. As he was not a compatible host, it only gave him the ability to change into a cat at will for up to ten minutes at a time or else he will not be able to regain his human. Ryô also built Mew Ichigo's and Mew Berry's respective robot assistants, R2000 and R3000. Ryô tends to talk to the girls in an abrupt manner, but displays a strong sense of personal responsibility, particularly with regards to the Mew Mews.

He helps Ichigo several times, in his cat form, "Alto", including by kissing her to help her change back human. Although Ryô's age is never given in the series, the official Tōkyō Myū Myū – Tōjō Shin Myū Myū! – Minna Issho ni Gohōshi Suru Nyan game guide lists him as being fifteen years old. In Mew Mew Power promotional material he is listed as being sixteen.

In the anime series, his voice actor is Kouichi Toochika. In the 4Kids Entertainment adaptation titled Mew Mew Power, his name is changed to Elliot Grant and he is voiced by Sean Schemmel. In the 2022 anime remake, his voice actor is Yuichi Nakamura.

=== Keiichirô Akasaka ===
Keiichirô Akasaka (赤坂 圭一郎, Akasaka Keiichirō; "Keiichiro" in the Tokyopop version) is the manager and baker at Cafe Mew Mew and Ryô's partner in the Mew Project. Keiichirô worked with Dr. Shirogane, Ryô Shirogane's father, on the Mew project five years before Tokyo Mew Mew is set and continued working on it with Ryô after Dr. Shirogane's death. Keiichirô's age is given neither in the manga nor the anime adaptations. In the official game guide for the 2002 PlayStation game Tōkyō Myū Myū – Tōjō Shin Myū Myū! – Minna Issho ni Gohōshi Suru Nyan, he is listed as being twenty-one years old. while in Mew Mew Power promotional materials, he is stated to be seventeen. The Mew Mews consider him to be a gentleman, with a charming, tactful, and kind personality. He can be mischievous and flirtatious as well; for example, he has offered to kiss Ichigo to change her out of her cat form.

In the anime series, his voice actor is Hikaru Midorikawa. In the 4Kids Entertainment adaptation titled Mew Mew Power, his name is changed to Wesley J. Coolridge III and he is voiced by Andrew Rannells. In the 2022 anime remake, his voice actor is Yusuke Shirai.

=== Tasuku Meguro ===
Tasuku Meguro (目黒 侑, Meguro Tasuku) is Berry Shirayuki's best friend and love interest in Tokyo Mew Mew a la Mode. He has lived beside Berry since they were born and has been best friends all their lives. After her mother's death, he began giving her a hug each morning to replace her mother, and to express his own feelings. He also roller blades a long distance to her new school to check on her. When he discovers Berry has become a Mew Mew, he reassures her that it does not bother him and he will never quit being her friend. As the story progresses, initially he tries to hide his feelings, but finally admits to himself that he is in love with Berry. Eventually he asks her if he can stop being her "childhood friend" before kissing her, apologizing, and running away before she can answer. While he berates himself for his behavior, Duke uses the opportunity to hypnotize him and turn him against Berry. He is freed from the spell when Berry confesses her own feelings and kisses him, after which he asks her to stay with him forever and she agrees. After the Saint Rose Crusaders are defeated, Berry and Tasuku celebrating being in love and continue working at Cafe Mew Mew as the cafe's new door-to-door delivery service.

=== Masha ===
Masha (マシャ, Masha) is a robot created to detect chimera animals and Mew Aqua. Originally called by her model number of R2000, Ichigo renames her "Masha" after Masaya. After the aliens are defeated, Masha chooses to stay with Ichigo when she goes to London with Masaya. In addition to detecting the chimera animals, Masha eats the jelly-fish like parasites that come out of the victims after they are defeated. She can also merge with Mew Aqua found by the Mew Mews to transform into the Mew Aqua Rod, allowing any of the Mew Mews to perform the Ribbon Aqua Drops healing attack. Primarily communicating by repeating the sounds "pi" and "tweet", Masha does not appear to be designed to support high-level speech initially, though in Tokyo Mew Mew a la Mode she is once shown speaking in a complete sentence. In the Tokyo Mew Mew anime adaptation, Masha is male instead of female, has a more extensive vocabulary, and tries, unsuccessfully, to assist the Mew Mews in some battles.

In the original Japanese series, he is voiced by Junko Noda. In the 4Kids Entertainment adaptation titled Mew Mew Power, his name is changed to Mini-Mew and he is voiced by Tom Wayland. In the 2022 anime remake, his voice actress is Kaori Ishihara.

=== Ucha ===
Ucha (ウチャ, Ucha) is the second robot created by Ryô. Appearing only in Tokyo Mew Mew a la Mode, the R3000 is given to Berry Shirayuki who names him Ucha. Ucha has similar abilities to Masha, but speaks in complete sentences and complains a lot. It also has a different appearance, resembling a strawberry with bunny ears, and can transform into Berry's staff weapon.

== Merchandise ==
Several types of merchandise have been produced based on the likeness of the characters in the Tokyo Mew Mew series. Apparel such as clothing, backpacks, and other accessories, have been released, as well as full costumes used for cosplay. Other merchandise includes action figures, plush dolls, key chains, and calendars.

== Reception ==
The characters of Tokyo Mew Mew have received praise from several publications for anime, manga, and other media. Anime Fringe's Patrick King praised Ikumi's character designs for being a perfect first for the feel of the series, noting that "one of the most attractive aspects of Tokyo Mew Mew is easily Mia Ikumi's ultra-cute artwork. Big eyes, cat ears, fuzzy tails, and short skirts all come together in a cuteness combo that's hard to resist." In Manga: The Complete Guide, Shaenon Garrity referred to the Mew Mews as "cute girls in animal-themed lingerie".

The new characters introduced in Tokyo Mew Mew a La Mode received more mixed reviews. Mania Entertainment's Mike Dungan found new Mew Mew Berry Shirayuki to be a "fun character" due to her energy and cheerfulness. He also found Tasuku to be a well-crafted complement, considering him "an excellent complement to [Berry]" and noting that his "outgoing charm and clinginess ... is surprisingly never annoying." However, Janet Crocker of Anime Fringe felt Berry was an overly shallow heroine that just mirrored the life Mew Ichigo (from the original Tokyo Mew Mew) in a shorter form and she dismissed the Saint Rose Crusaders' costumes and plans as being nothing more than concepts borrowed from Sailor Moon. She also criticized the specific design used for the character Duke, whose white robe she felt was too similar to those used by the white supremacy group, the Ku Klux Klan. Anime News Network's Carlo Santos notes that "Berry has the potential to become insufferable", but felt she acted more like a "typical preteen girl" who was "sweet" and "silly" but "stop[s] right before it gets annoying", thus avoiding being a standard "marketable character trying to rack up charm points."

== See also ==
- List of Tokyo Mew Mew chapters
- List of Tokyo Mew Mew episodes
- List of Tokyo Mew Mew New episodes
