= List of Tokyo Mew Mew chapters =

The first volume of the original Japanese release of Tokyo Mew Mew, published by Kodansha on February 6, 2001

The chapters of the manga series Tokyo Mew Mew were written by Reiko Yoshida and illustrated by Mia Ikumi. The first chapter premiered in the September 2000 issue of Nakayoshi, where it was serialized monthly until its conclusion in the February 2003 issue. The series focuses on five girls infused with the DNA of rare animals that gives them special powers and allows them to transform into "Mew Mews". Led by Ichigo Momomiya, the girls protect the earth from aliens who wish to "reclaim" it. A sequel, Tokyo Mew Mew a la Mode written and illustrated solely by Mia Ikumi, was serialized in Nakayoshi from April 2003 to February 2004. The sequel introduces a new Mew Mew, Berry Shirayuki, who becomes the temporary leader of the Mew Mews while they face a new threat in the form of the Saint Rose Crusaders.

The 27 unnamed chapters were collected and published in seven tankōbon volumes by Kodansha starting on February 1, 2001; the last volume was released on April 4, 2003. The 11 chapters of Tokyo Mew Mew a la Mode were published in two tankōbon volumes on November 6, 2003, and April 6, 2004. Tokyo Mew Mew was adapted into a 52-episode anime series by Studio Pierrot that aired in Japan on TV Aichi and other TXN affiliates from April 6, 2002, to March 29, 2003. The manga series is licensed for regional language releases by Pika Édition in France, Japonica Polonica Fantastica in Poland, in Finnish by Sangatsu Manga, and Carlsen Comics in Germany, Denmark, and Sweden.

Tokyo Mew Mew was licensed for an English-language release in North America by Tokyopop. It released the first volume of Tokyo Mew Mew on April 8, 2003, and released new volumes monthly until the final volume was released on May 11, 2004. The company also licensed Tokyo Mew Mew a la Mode, publishing the first volume on June 7, 2005, and the second on December 8, 2006. In the original Japanese releases the chapters are unnamed, while Tokyopop added chapter names to their English release, sometimes combining numbered chapters under a single name. Tokyo Mew Mew and its sequel are among the first manga series Public Square Books chose to release in Spanish in North America. Tokyo Mew Mew was also released in English in Singapore by Chuang Yi.

== Volume list ==
=== Tokyo Mew Mew ===
No.	Original release date	Original ISBN	North America release date	North America ISBN
1	February 6, 2001	978-4-06-178955-5	April 8, 2003	978-1-59182-236-3
Chapters 1–4: In the Beginning (Note: In the North American English release of Tokyo Mew Mew, Tokyopop combined the four unnamed chapters in the first volume into a single named chapter.); Before Tokyo Mew Mew Was Created; Photo Shoot Report; Afterward
During an earthquake at an endangered species exhibit, Ichigo Momomiya and four other girls are bathed in a strange light. Ichigo sees herself being merged with a cat. Afterwards, she begins to display cat-like behaviors. The following day, Ichigo is at the river with her crush, Masaya Aoyama, when they are attacked by a monster rat. While Masaya is unconscious, Ichigo is rescued by Ryou Shirogane, who prompts her to defeat the monster. Ichigo transforms into the heroine Mew Ichigo and quickly defeats the rat, which Ryou explains is an alien parasite called a "chimera anima" that turns animals into monsters. (Note: In the first releases of the manga, Tokyopop misspells this as "kimera anima", but changed it to "chimera anima" in later volumes.) Ichigo learns that she is a "Mew Mew", a biological weapon created to protect the Earth from these aliens. After they are joined by Keiichiro Akasaka, they go to Cafe Mew Mew, the Mew Project's headquarters. Ryou and Keiichiro request that Ichigo find the other four Mew Mews, the girls she met at the exhibit. After meeting her through Masaya, Ichigo realizes that Mint Aizawa is a Mew Mew. After a battle with Mint's dog, which was infected by a chimera anima, Mint joins the project and both girls begin working at the café to help gather information and find the others. Hearing reports about a ghost haunting a school's pool, they investigate and learn the "ghost" is Lettuce Midorikawa, the third Mew Mew. Scared and confused, she had lost control of herself and her powers, but Ichigo and Mint calm her down and she joins the group. On another date with Masaya, Ichigo gets excited and is horrified to find that the cat ears she normally sports as Mew Ichigo have popped out. Though unseen by Masaya, they are seen by a young acrobatic girl. While Ichigo tries to think of an explanation, an alien named Quiche appears in front of them and kisses Ichigo.
2	July 6, 2001	978-4-06-178965-4	June 17, 2003	978-1-59182-237-0
Chapters 5–9: Three Plus Two (Note: In the North American English release of Tokyo Mew Mew, Tokyopop combined the four unnamed chapters in the second volume into a single named chapter.); Afterward; Final Thoughts
Quiche sends out numerous chimera animas to infect the various wild animals on display at the park. Joined by Mint and Lettuce, Ichigo defeats the monster animals, but the parasites evade capture by jumping into new animals. The acrobatic girl is revealed to be Pudding Fong, the fourth Mew Mew. She traps all of the chimera animas in a barrier, which allows them to be captured and Quiche retreats. Ichigo reunites with Masaya who is angry at her because he could not find her and was worried. After she apologizes he notices she has lost her choker, so he ties a belled cat ribbon taken from a stray cat around her neck and tells her that she is his "all-time favorite kitty." Later, girls identify the last Mew Mew, a model named Zakuro Fujiwara. When they go to meet her, they watch Zakuro transform without needing prompting and defeat some chimera animas. They introduce themselves, but she coldly refuses to join the others. Mint, who idolized her, is disappointed so the girls gather at her house to cheer her up. Quiche attacks Ichigo during the night, but the others drive him off. As he leaves, he says he is going to get the lone Zakuro, so the girls quickly go to the studio to protect her. With the five girls transformed together, Ichigo gains a stronger attack power and defeats the powerful monster. Afterwards, they realize the battle had been televised live, so Ichigo introduces the team to the viewers as "Tokyo Mew Mew." With Zakuro now a member of the team, Ryou and Keiichiro tell them more about the alien invasion and tell them to begin searching for a "mew aqua", a substance formed by pure water which is critical to defeating the aliens for good. Later after battling a chimera anima at Inohara Park, Masaya sees Mew Ichigo and calls her "Ichigo".
3	January 5, 2002	978-4-06-178981-4	August 12, 2003	978-1-59182-238-7
Chapter 10: "Shall We Dance?"; Chapter 11: "Cruise Control"; Chapter 12: "Alien Invasion"; Chapter 13: "The Truth About Cats and Dogs"; Afterward; Bonus Comic
Ichigo avoids Masaya out of fear that he knows her secret. Quiche is joined by two other aliens, Pie and Tart. While Quiche is confined for being unable to defeat the Mews Mews, Pie takes over attacking the girls and sends a chimera anima to attack Ichigo's school. Masaya watches the battle and afterwards tells Mew Ichigo that he called her "Ichigo" because she resembles someone he cares about. Happy that her secret is safe, she waits for him in the hall in her normal form. Pie attacks a cruise ship but the Mew Mews again defeat the monster he sends. With Pie's two failures, Quiche is released from his confinement and the trio wonder when their leader, "Deep Blue," will awaken to help them reclaim Earth. On a date with Masaya, Ichigo gets excited by a hug and runs away, only to find she has changed into a black cat. Thinking Ichigo ditched him, Masaya finds the cat and takes her home, but his dog later chases her out of the house. Ryou finds her and explains that her cat genes are taking over so they must hurry to defeat the aliens before she becomes a cat permanently. When they are accidentally separated, Masaya finds her again and takes her back to his house. Meanwhile, the other Mew Mews investigate a strange cocoon near the town's radio tower, but are defeated by Quiche, Pie, and Tart. While Masaya is asleep, Ichigo steals a kiss, which turns her back to normal, but lying beside him excites her so much she turns to a cat again. She leaves and runs into a gray cat who kisses her, changing her back to normal. After a brief run-in with Tart, Ichigo finds Ryou, who fills her in on what happened with the others.
4	April 5, 2002	978-4-06-178987-6	October 14, 2003	978-1-59182-239-4
Chapter 14: "Kiss and Tell"; Chapter 15: "Tokyo Power Tales"; Chapter 16: "Young Love"; Extra: "Tokyo Black Cat Girl"
The girls begin their search for mew aqua, but are pulled into another fight with Quiche. During the fight, Masaya calls Ichigo to ask her to meet him at five o'clock and she agrees just before Quiche's chimera anima eats her phone. The Mew Mews quickly defeat it and are subsequently attacked by Quiche, Pie, and Tart. While they fight, a dust waiburn hatches from the cocoon on the radio tower and begins spreading a pollution-filled dust around the city. The girls' attacks are not working until Mint senses that a mew aqua is in the air near the top of the tower. She flies up to get it, allowing her to receive a new power that clears away all of the dust. The Mew Mews defeat the waiburn by combining their powers to activate Mew Ichigo's most powerful attack and the aliens flee. Now almost 8 o'clock, Ichigo desperately rushes to the meeting spot, certain Masaya has left and will hate her. Though it is raining, he is still waiting. Ichigo cries, but he hugs her and tells her he loves her. With his jacket covering her head to protect her from the rain, Ichigo is able to confess she loves him too without fear of his seeing her ears. They make plans to meet again on Sunday, but while Ichigo is waiting she changes into a cat again. The gray cat appears again, introducing himself as Alto, and kisses her to return to normal. During the date, Quiche attacks and Ichigo is separated from Masaya, allowing her to transform. She is struggling to defeat the powerful chimera anima alone when a blond haired, blue-eyed alien who calls himself the Blue Knight appears and swears to protect her.
5	August 5, 2002	978-4-06-178995-1	January 13, 2004	978-1-59182-548-7
Chapter 17: "The Blue Knight"; Chapter 18: "Rescue Mission"; Chapter 19: "Truth or Dare"; Chapter 20: "Masaya Confessions"; About the Fifth Volume; Tokyo Mew Mew Another Story: "Petite Mew Mew"
After they defeat the monster, the Blue Knight also easily defeats Quiche. That evening, Pie and Tart capture Pudding and imprison her beneath the Tokyo Dome. The aliens have dug out the ground from under the dome, intending to collapse it and kill 50,000 people who are attending a concert inside. Tart guards Pudding, but instead of being afraid of the situation, Pudding acts friendly with Tart, calling him her buddy, nicknaming him Tar Tar, and giving him a piece of candy. Confused at her reaction, Tart leaves to attack the newly arrived Mew Mews. They defeat his chimera animas, and rescue Pudding by taunting Tart into breaking open the cage himself. Furious, he dispatches a chimera anima to attack Ichigo, but the Blue Knight protects her. Pudding senses a mew aqua and activates it, causing large trees to grow around the dome and spreading their roots under it to hold it up. As he leaves, Tart complains about his loss but laughs while looking at the candy Pudding gave him. The following day, Quiche attacks Ichigo and Masaya again. Ichigo is forced to reveal that she is Mew Ichigo to fight the alien. The Blue Knight joins her and badly wounds Quiche, nearly killing him, before Ichigo stops him allowing Pie and Tart to take their friend away. After the Blue Knight leaves, Masaya confesses that he already knew and had only pretended otherwise because she did not seem to want him to know. Ichigo explains about her excited states, including changing into a cat which Tart witnesses. Tart later tries to attack Ichigo while she is in cat form, but Alto arrives and transforms her back. Tart retreats and Ichigo learns that Alto is actually Ryou.
6	December 6, 2002	978-4-06-364006-9	March 9, 2004	978-1-59182-549-4
Chapter 21: "Who is the Blue Knight?"; Chapter 22: "A Kiss for Kish"; Chapter 23: "Finding Masaya"; Chapter 24: "A Dome of Doom"; "Sleeping Beauty of Strawberry Forest" (TokyoPop translation) Original title: "Sleeping Princess of Berry Forest"
Ryou and Keiichiro share the history of the Mew Project with Ichigo. They also explain that before the girls became Mew Mews, Ryou first tested the procedure on himself, resulting in his ability to change into a cat at will for up to ten minutes at a time. Upon learning this, Ichigo becomes more determined to do her best and defeat the aliens. Pie uses a chimera anima to infect the ocean waters with a red tide. While the other Mew Mews fight Pie and the monster, Lettuce detects a mew aqua and uses it to clean the water. After the battle, Ichigo runs into Masaya, but Quiche appears and kidnaps her. Masaya follows to demand her release and reveals that he is the Blue Knight, though until now he had been unaware of it. Freed, Ichigo leaves to help the other Mew Mews under attack at the café while the Blue Knight defeats Quiche. Pie and Tart erect a dome over the city that causes the temperature to rise dangerously, then join Quiche and bow before the Blue Knight, saying they have been waiting for him. Confused at their reaction, he leaves to find Ichigo. Ichigo is searching for the other Mew Mews when Quiche attacks her. He declares that he loves her, but she rejects him, causing him to cry and demand to know how he can make her love him. Before leaving, he promises to buy her more time. The Blue Knight finds her and they join the other Mew Mews. Zakuro finds another mew aqua and uses it to remove the dome. As they celebrate their victory, the Blue Knight collapses and transforms into Deep Blue, the alien leader. After attacking Ichigo, he tells her that both Masaya and the Blue Knight were only creations he made to deceive the world.
7	April 4, 2003	978-4-06-364017-5	May 11, 2004	978-1-59182-550-0
Chapter 25: "Deep Blue Revealed"; Chapter 26: "You Love the Earth"; Chapter 27: "A Transfer of Power"; "Petite Mew Mew"
Ichigo is initially unable to deal with Masaya's true identity of Deep Blue and attacks her fellow Mew Mews when they try to attack the alien. Realizing she hurt her friends, she is able to calm down enough to listen to her friends as they warn her that Deep Blue will kill everyone if they do not stop him. Deep Blue knocks the other Mew Mews back then tries to kill Ichigo, but Alto protects her. Wounded, he changes back to Ryou and reminds her of her duty to protect Earth. Certain Masaya would also want Deep Blue stopped no matter what, Ichigo goes after the final mew aqua in the air above Tokyo while the other Mew Mews engage Pie and Tart in a final battle. Ichigo finds the mew aqua, but Deep Blue is waiting for her and attacks. Quiche arrives and protects her then challenges Deep Blue to a duel, determined to protect Ichigo, but Deep Blue fatally wounds him. As he lies dying in a crying Ichigo's arms, he tells her again that he loves her. Masaya is able to regain control of Deep Blue's body long enough to encase Ichigo in a protective bubble and tell her he loves her. He releases the final mew aqua inside the body, killing both Deep Blue and himself. The power of the mew aqua spreads over the city, healing all of Tokyo, including the Mew Mews, Pie, and Tart. It also brings Quiche back to life. Heartbroken over Masaya's death, Ichigo gives her life to revive Masaya. After carrying Ichigo's body to her mourning friends, Masaya kisses her, releasing more of the mew aqua and bringing her back to life. The aliens return to their own planet, taking a gift of mew aqua with them so they can rejuvenate the planet. Masaya decides to study abroad to study endangered species, so the girls hold a mock wedding for he and Ichigo before he leaves.

=== Tokyo Mew Mew a la Mode ===
No.	Original release date	Original ISBN	North America release date	North America ISBN
1	November 6, 2003	978-4-06-364034-2	June 7, 2005	978-1-59532-789-5
Chapters 1–6; Extra: "Killing Time"; Postscript
Ryou and Keiichiro are concerned about the reappearance of chimera animas, and discuss making a new Mew Mew. Ichigo has gone to England with Masaya, leaving Mint, Lettuce, Pudding, and Zakuro with the task of dealing with the monsters by themselves. Berry Shirayuki transfers to a middle school in Tokyo because she likes the cute uniforms. After her first day of school, she is saved from a nasty fall by Ryou. Wanting to thank him, she follows him to the café, where she accidentally enters the Mew Project laboratory and is merged with the DNA of two endangered species. Shocked, she faints then pretends that she does not remember Ryou telling her she is now a Mew Mew, but later begins exhibiting rabbit-like behaviors. Her best friend and neighbor, Tasuku Meguro, realizes something is bothering her so he comes and convinces her to miss school. It is revealed that the Saint Rose Crusaders, Royal Highness, Happy Child, Blue Bayou, and Sweet Juliet, led by Duke, are now controlling the chimera animas. They send two of the monsters to attack the new Mew Mew, Berry. She transforms and defeats them. She worries about how Tasuku will react to her new abilities, but he thinks it is cool and that she is cute. Royal Highness goes to Berry's school disguised as a special lecturer. He hypnotizes her classmates and teacher and uses them to capture Berry, but she is rescued by Tasuku and the other Mew Mews. The other Mew Mews transfer to her school to help protect her, but Happy Child lures Berry away from them. With her alone, he attacks using an ultra-sonic wave, but Mew Ichigo suddenly appears and helps her defeat them. Berry and Tasuku join the Mew Mew members in working at the café. Blue Bayou attacks a stadium while Sweet Juliet, disguised as a reporter, broadcasts the Mew Mews defeating him and begins generating a lot of publicity and public affection for the girls.
2	April 6, 2004	978-4-06-364046-5	December 8, 2006	978-1-59532-790-1
Chapters 7–10; "Petite Mew Mew"; "Rabbit Starfall"
Berry realizes she is in love with Tasuku, but is unsure how to handle her feelings. Tasuku also loves her, but is hesitant to cross over from friend to boyfriend. Tasuku upsets her by asking if they can stop being childhood friends, causing Berry to begin apologizing for a variety of perceived wrongs. He stops her by almost kissing her, and then angry at himself, he runs away and is captured by Duke. The Mew Mews have become very popular due to the media buzz created by the Saint Rose Crusaders, so the group now begins spreading rumors that the Mew Mews are fakes and have been causing all the problems themselves to get attention. Hypnotized by Duke, Tasuku returns to work and forcefully kisses Berry before attacking her. The arrival of the Ichigo and the others cause him to flee. The girls go to Shibuya to evacuate people from a building that has a bomb planted in it. Berry barely escapes with the last person, a little girl, before the building explodes. However, the people in the area turn on them, accusing the Mew Mews of planting the bomb. Blaming her for the Mew Mews "becoming bad", the citizens direct their attacks at Mew Berry, who runs away to protect the others. She spots Tasuku and tries to talk to him, but the people catch up to her. The little girl she saved from the bomb tries to help Berry, but the people will not listen so Berry flees. Seeing the girl off to safety, she returns to Tasuku. When she tells him that she loves him and kisses him, the spell is broken. Together they send out the joy and love in their hearts to everyone, freeing the citizens from the hypnotism and causing the Crusaders to regret their actions. At the café, Tasuku and Berry team up for the shop's new delivery service and the Mew Mews agree that they will all be friends "to the very end."

== See also ==
- List of Tokyo Mew Mew characters
- List of Tokyo Mew Mew episodes
- List of Tokyo Mew Mew New episodes
