= List of Tokyo Mew Mew episodes =

Tokyo Mew Mew
- The first volume of the Region 2 DVD release of Tokyo Mew Mew; released August 21, 2002
- No. of episodes: 52 (Japanese); 26 (English)

Release
- Original network: TXN (TV Aichi)
- Original release: April 6, 2002 – March 29, 2003

The episodes of the Tokyo Mew Mew anime series are based on the manga series of the same name written by Reiko Yoshida and illustrated by Mia Ikumi. Directed by Noriyuki Abe and produced by Studio Pierrot, the episodes focus on five girls infused with the DNA of rare animals that gives them special powers and allows them to transform into "Mew Mews". Led by Ichigo Momomiya, the girls protect the earth from aliens who wish to "reclaim" it.

Broadcast on both TV Aichi and other TXN affiliates, the series premiered on April 6, 2002, and aired weekly until its conclusion on March 29, 2003. 4Kids Entertainment licensed the first 26 episodes of the series for the English-dubbed release in North America in 2004. Their release, initially titled Hollywood Mew Mew, would be heavily edited and localized to the point that viewers would not recognize its Japanese origins. The series was later referred to as The Mew Mews and Tokyo Mew Mew in subsequent 4Kids press releases.

The English dub premiered on 4Kids TV on February 19, 2005, under the name Mew Mew Power. As 4Kids had announced, the characters and episodes were renamed, scenes were cut, the original episode story lines were modified, and the music was replaced with a new score. Twenty-three episodes of Mew Mew Power aired before the series was canceled after 4Kids was unable to acquire the license for the remaining twenty-six episodes of the series. All 26 episodes of Mew Mew Power aired in Canada on YTV in 2005, and in the United Kingdom on Pop Girl in 2008. Mew Mew Power was licensed for regional-language broadcast in France by Arès Films.

The episodes use two pieces of theme music: "My Sweet Heart", performed by Rika Komatsu for the opening theme, and "Koi wa A La Mode", performed by the five voice actors who played the Mew Mews, for the ending. In the Mew Mew Power English adaptation, the opening theme for the episodes is replaced with "Team Up", performed by Bree Sharp. Nine DVD compilations were released by Interchannel in Japan. Although Mew Mew Power has not been released to home video in North America, ten of the 4Kids episodes were released to Region 4 in North American on Warner Bros. Home Entertainment. Madman Entertainment DVD in Australia and New Zealand by Magna Pacific and all twenty-six dubbed episodes were released to Region 2 DVD in South Africa. Warner Home Vidéo France released nine episodes of the Arès Films dub of Mew Mew Power to DVD in a single DVD volume. The final 26 episodes were released in two DVD box sets in uncut, French dubbed format through AK Vidéo.

== Episode list ==
=== Season 1 (2002) ===
No.	Title / Mew Mew Power Title	Directed by	Written by	Original release date	English air date
1	"Turning into a Cat, the Hero Is a Girl in Love" / "The Mew Kid in Town"; Transliteration: "Neko ni naru, seigi no mikata wa koisuru shōjo nyan" (Japanese: ネコになる、正義の味方は恋する少女にゃん)	Noriyuki Abe	Masashi Sogo	April 6, 2002	February 26, 2005
While Ichigo Momomiya is on her first date with Masaya Aoyama, she is bathed in a strange light and sees herself being merged with a cat. Afterwards, she begins to display cat-like behaviors. The next day, Ichigo follows Masaya into a park, where a strange jellyfish-like creature takes over a rat's body, turning it into a monster. Ryou Shirogane saves Ichigo and gives her a power pendant allowing her to transform into Mew Ichigo. With her new powers, she defeats the monster, turning it back into a normal rat. Afterwards, Ryou refuses to explain what just occurred, so the newly arrived Keiichirou Akasaka offers to do so instead.
2	"A New Comrade, the Hero is a Real Lady" / "Mew Two"; Transliteration: "Atarashī nakama, seigi no mikata wa chō ojōsama nyan" (Japanese: 新しい仲間、正義の味方は超お嬢様にゃん)	Akihiro Enomoto	Masashi Sogo	April 13, 2002	March 5, 2005
Ryou and Keiichirou tell Ichigo that the creature she saw was a parasitic alien, called a chimera anima. To stop them, the Mew Project infused five girls with the DNA from specific endangered species, enabling the girls to become "Mew Mews". Ichigo begins working at Cafe Mew Mew while searching for the other four girls who bear the Mew marks. Keiichirou gives her a robot, Masha, to help with her work. While going home, Ichigo meets Minto Aizawa and her dog, Miki. Later, Ichigo visits Minto's home to return a handkerchief, but Minto's dog becomes infected by a chimera anima. During the battle, Ichigo discovers that Minto is the second Mew Mew, Mew Mint. They defeat the monster, returning the dog to normal. Minto joins Ichigo in working at the café.
3	"School Ghost Stories, Finding the Ghost's True Identity" / "Pooltergeist"; Transliteration: "Gakkō no kaidan, obake no shōtai mitsukedasu nyan" (Japanese: 学校の怪談、おばけの正体見つけ出すにゃん)	Jōhei Matsuura	Masashi Sogo	April 20, 2002	March 12, 2005
Ichigo meets a shy and timid girl named Retasu Midorikawa. Later at the café, Ichigo sees her with three other girls, who are trying to coerce an unwilling Retasu to try to photograph a rumored school ghost. Ichigo "accidentally" dumps parfaits on them to get them to leave Retasu alone. After work, Minto and Ichigo go to the school to investigate the "ghost". Instead, they find Retasu who was afraid of being isolated because of her new powers and started "haunting" the pool. After a brief fight, Ichigo and Minto calm her by explaining her Mew powers and welcome her to the team. While Ichigo is walking home, an alien named Quiche appears, steals her first kiss, and introduces himself before disappearing again.
4	"A Date in Tears, a Secret I Can't Tell Aoyama" / "The Lion Thing"; Transliteration: "Namida no dēto, Aoyama-kun ni ienai himitsu nyan" (Japanese: 涙のデート、青山君にいえない秘密にゃん)	Hiroaki Nakajima	Natsuko Takahashi	April 27, 2002	March 19, 2005
Upset about her first kiss stolen, Ichigo avoids Aoyama, even declining a date with him. While looking for chimera animas, Masha leads her to the park where she runs into Masaya. Resolved to forget the kiss, Ichigo agrees to spend time with him. Quiche attacks the park, turning a lion into a chimera anima. Ichigo leaves a worried Masaya behind as she hides to transform and fight. After Mew Mint and Mew Lettuce arrive, the three defeat the monster. When Ichigo finds Masaya, he scolds her for running away. As they walk home, he explains his worry about her, and Ichigo promises not to do it again.
5	"Stormy Rhythmic Gymnastics, Becoming a Shining Star with a Cat Dance" / "Gymewstics"; Transliteration: "Arashi no shintaisō, neko no mai de kagayaku hoshi ni naru nyan" (Japanese: 嵐の新体操、ネコの舞で輝く星になるにゃん)	Noriyuki Abe	Tetsuo Tanaka	May 4, 2002	March 26, 2005
The school rhythmic gymnastics team sees Ichigo avoid the path of an on-coming bus by leaping over it, and the team recruits her. A promise from Masaya to come and cheer for her at the gymnastics meet changes Ichigo's participation from reluctant to enthusiastic. After Ichigo's spectacular individual performance, Quiche attacks with a chimera anima. After the Mew Mews defeat the monster, competition continues; but Ichigo's performance drops during her team's round due to exhaustion from the fight. The team is happy with their second place win and names Ichigo the team's Most Valuable Player.
6	"Piano of the Heart, the Exciting Ball" / "Party 'Til You Mew"; Transliteration: "Kokoro no piano, tokimeki no butōkai nyan" (Japanese: 心のピアノ、ときめきの舞踏会にゃん)	Junya Koshiba	Masashi Sogo	May 11, 2002	April 2, 2005
While cleaning the café, a woman approaches Ichigo and Retasu and begins speaking to them in English (Spanish in the 4Kids dub), but they cannot understand her. Masaya appears and translates for them. The woman, Mary McGuire (Maria Rivera in the 4Kids Dub), is a pianist who Ryou asked for a performance at an upcoming formal party to reward the girls for their good work ( the party was a wildlife charity event in the 4Kids dub). During the party, Quiche appears and uses a new technique to steal Mary's (Maria's) spirit to create a chimera anima. During the battle, he mentions the name of the mysterious alien leader, Deep Blue. The girls use Mary's (Maria's) music to weaken the monster, enabling the girls to defeat it and return her spirit back to her body.
7	"Enter Purin, the Ears and Tails are Part of the Act" / "Monkey See, Monkey Mew"; Transliteration: "Purin tōjō, mimi to shippo mo gei no uchi" (Japanese: 歩鈴登場、耳とシッポも芸のうち)	Shigeki Hatakeyama	Akatsuki Yamatoya	May 18, 2002	April 9, 2005
Returning from the grocery store, Ichigo stops to rest on a bench. A young girl, Bu-Ling Huang, begins performing acrobatic tricks in front of her and then demands a tip. Ichigo gives her a piece of candy then runs off. Angered, Bu-Ling causes Ichigo's cat ears and tail to pop out. Amazed, Bu-Ling chases Ichigo wanting her own set of ears and tail in order to make money. Ichigo finally yells at her but later at the café feels sorry for the girl as they wonder why she wants to make money so badly and goes to apologize. The next day, Quiche attempts to steal Bu-Ling's spirit, but the Mew Mews stop him. Using the spirit of another human stolen earlier, he attacks with a chimera anima. While protecting Ichigo and Minto from the monster's attacks, Bu-Ling's Mew mark is revealed and she transforms into Mew Pudding. She quickly helps them defeat the monster and is ecstatic to join the Mew Mews.
8	"To the Hot Spring! The Miracle of Love in the Mysterious Mountains" / "Spa Blahs!"; Transliteration: "Onsen e GO! Shinpi no yama no ai no kiseki" (Japanese: 温泉へGO！神秘の山の愛の奇跡)	Jōhei Matsuura	Tetsuo Tanaka	May 25, 2002	April 16, 2005
The girls win a day-trip to a resort in the mountains. On the way up the mountain, they stop at a shrine to eat lunch where a boy named Masazou Aoyamada yells at them for desecrating the shrine of Bacchigappa, the god of the mountain. The girls find a natural hot spring and stop to relax. There they learn that the resort is under construction and that their prize trip is for the following year. Masazou tries to stop the construction workers, claiming that the work has scared away the local otters and is destroying their habitat. Quiche arrives and steals the boy's spirit to create a chimera anima. The Mew Mews defeat the monster and restore Masazou's spirit. The incident prompts the other villagers to join in Masazou's cause to oppose the construction.
9	"My Dear Brother, Memories Are in the Photos" / "Do Mew Want to Dance?"; Transliteration: "Itoshi no onīsama, omoide wa shashin no naka ni" (Japanese: 愛しのお兄様、思い出は写真の中に)	Hiroaki Nakajima	Natsuko Takahashi	June 1, 2002	April 23, 2005
While at Minto's house to borrow a dress, Ichigo meets her older brother, Seiji, who is going to study abroad. She is saddened to learn that they have grown apart after seeing an old photo of the two. Wanting to help the siblings reconcile, Ichigo invites him to attend Minto's next ballet performance. When the girls bring Seiji to Minto's dressing room before the performance, Minto maintains her distance from her brother. As he is leaving, a chimera anima attacks and Seiji tries to protect Minto. After the Mew Mews defeat it, Minto again tells Seiji he should not waste his time there. He gives her a bouquet of flowers and tells her that she is still important to him.
10	"The Last Comrade, the Phantom Lone Wolf" / "Hollywood Mew Mew Part 1"; Transliteration: "Saigo no nakama, maboroshi no ippikiōkami" (Japanese: 最後の仲間、まぼろしの一匹狼)	Akihiro Enomoto	Tetsuo Tanaka	June 8, 2002	April 30, 2005
One night, a mysterious girl saves two people from a chimera anima. At the café, the girls read a newspaper article about the incident and realize that none of them is the girl shown in the picture. Minto arrives and recognizes the girl as Zakuro Fujiwara, a famous model whom she idolizes. Ryou sends the girls to an audition to meet her, but Bu-Ling's tricks nearly get them kicked out. That night, the girls find her praying at a church where she is attacked by a flock of crows infected by chimera animas. Before the girls acted, Zakuro transforms and defeats them all. Afterwards, the girls are shocked when she refuses to join them and stubbornly dismisses them as annoying.
11	"Having Faith, All Five of Us Are Tokyo Mew Mew" / "The Taming of the Mew Part 2"; Transliteration: "Shinjiru kokoro, gonin sorotte Tōkyō myūmyū" (Japanese: 信じる心、五人そろって東京ミュウミュウ)	Junya Koshiba	Masashi Sogo	June 15, 2002	May 7, 2005
Minto is upset by Zakuro's rejection, and the others try to cheer her up. Ichigo and the others go to talk to Zakuro. Meanwhile, Quiche approaches Zakuro and offers her a deal to return her body to normal if she joins him. When the girls arrive, Quiche traps Minto, Retasu, and Bu-Ling in an alternate dimension. He then demands a fight between Ichigo and Zakuro in exchange for the trapped friends. Ichigo refuses and returns to the café where Ryou encourages her to trust in Zakuro and share her feelings. While shooting a television show, Zakuro is attacked by a chimera anima. Ichigo arrives and battles the monster while Zakuro saves the others. After its defeat, Zakuro agrees to be a part of the team. Apparently, the entire battle was aired on live television, and so they introduce themselves to Tokyo as the protectors of justice, "Tokyo Mew Mew".
12	"Identity Revealed, Cherry Blossoms Falling Out of Season" / "The Main Mew's Muse"; Transliteration: "Barechatta, kisetsuhazure no sakura chiru" (Japanese: バレちゃった、季節はずれの桜散る)	Shigeki Hatakeyama	Masashi Sogo	June 22, 2002	February 19, 2005
Masaya takes Ichigo to Inohara Park to show her a large cherry tree that is unusually blooming out of season. The next day, Keiichirou discovers that five cherry trees have been infected by the aliens explaining the early blooming. The Mew Mews set out to destroy them simultaneously, or the trees will release a poison dangerous to Tokyo. Mew Ichigo takes the tree in Inohara Park, where Quiche waits for her. A fight keeps Ichigo from attacking the tree, and it begins releasing its poison. Ichigo jumps into the tree and successfully destroys it. After Quiche leaves, Mew Ichigo finds Masaya standing behind her after he called out "Ichigo".
13	"Hearts at Odds, Aoyama the Target" / "Slime and Slime Again"; Transliteration: "Surechigau kokoro, nerawareta Aoyama-kun" (Japanese: すれ違う心、狙われた青山くん)	Junya Koshiba	Akatsuki Yamatoya	June 29, 2002	May 14, 2005
Worried Masaya discovered her identity, Ichigo avoids him. Later, Ichigo intends to cheer for Masaya during a kendo match but is unable to face him. Later, a jealous Quiche attacks him with a chimera anima capable of recreating itself when attacked. Ichigo tries to fight the monster but is unable to destroy it. Quiche tells her that he will let Masaya go if Ichigo becomes his, but Ichigo refuses and instead dives into the slime and grabs Masaya's hand. Her body begins to glow and she breaks free, destroying the monster. Quiche retreats and Masaya apologizes to Mew Ichigo for calling her "Ichigo", explaining that she looked like someone he knew. Later, he thanks Ichigo for coming to cheer for him and ties a bell collar around her neck so she cannot run from him anymore. Disappointed in Quiche's continued failures, Deep Blue sends two more aliens, Pie and Tart, to help him destroy the Mew Mews.
14	"Secrets of Akasaka, a Story of Sad Love" / "Butterflies Are Freaky"; Transliteration: "Akasaka no himitsu, setsunai koi no monogatari" (Japanese: 赤坂の秘密、切ない恋の物語)	Yutaka Hirata	Masashi Sogo	July 6, 2002	September 10, 2005
Keiichirou begins making a beautiful birthday cake for someone, and the girls ponder whom it might be for. Later, Ichigo meets a woman named Rei studying butterflies. She later learns that Rei is Keiichirou's ex-girlfriend, and the intended recipient of the cake. Even though they separated due to their different interests and jobs, he continues making her new birthday cakes for her. The girls try to get them meet again to resolve their lingering feelings. At Rei's house, her spirit is stolen by Pie and Tart and used to make a chimera anima. With help from Keiichirou, they are able to defeat the monster and retrieve Rei's spirit. In the end, Rei and Keiichirou truly go their separate ways.
15	"Masha, the Little Hero—Life-Threatening Friendship" / "The Hero Lies in Mew"; Transliteration: "Chīsana yūsha, Masha inochigake no yūjō" (Japanese: 小さな勇者、マシャ 命がけの友情)	Junya Koshiba	Tetsuo Tanaka	July 13, 2002	September 17, 2005
The girls wonder about Masha's usefulness beyond just detecting chimera animas and eating the parasites. The discussion leads Masha to question his confidence. While the Mew Mews fight a chimera anima, he tries to fight alongside and ends up swallowed by the monster. Tart and Pie retreat to the alien dimension. Upon discovery of Masha, Pie tries to extract Masha's data. In turn, Masha uses the connection to the aliens' computers to send a message to the girls, enabling them to find a way to the dimension. Before they leave, Ryou gives Ichigo a new weapon, the Mewberry Rod. When the girls reach the alien area, they are quickly captured, but Masha gets himself free and rescues them. Ichigo uses her new attack to destroy the chimera anima, allowing them to return to their own dimension. Masha promises not to try to fight anymore.
16	"Retasu's Love, an Earnest Love in the Library" / "Books Of Love"; Transliteration: "Retasu no koi, ichizu na omoi wa toshokan de" (Japanese: れたすの恋、一途な思いは図書館で)	Jōhei Matsuura	Akatsuki Yamatoya	July 20, 2002	September 24, 2005
Retasu meets a young man named Norihiro at the library. She falls in love with him and begins going there every day to see him. When he gives her a present, the girls encourage her to tell him how she feels. During their next meeting at the library, they are attacked by a chimera anima. Seeing Norihiro rush to protect the young librarian, Satsuki, Retasu realizes that she is the girl he really loves. The other Mew Mews arrive, but the monster begins reading a dull book in a hypnotic voice, putting all of the girls to sleep except the book loving Retasu. She transforms and defeats the monster. Later, she sees Norihiro gives Satsuki an engagement ring. Though sad at how her first love ended, she says she is happy she was able to love someone.
17	"A Knight in Blue, I'll protect you!" / "A Knight to Remember Part 1"; Transliteration: "Ao no kishi, omae wa ore ga mamoru!" (Japanese: 蒼の騎士、おまえは俺が守る！)	Noriyuki Abe	Masashi Sogo	July 27, 2002	October 1, 2005
The data gathered by Masha reveals that the aliens originally inhabited the earth, but had to leave because of changes in the environment, ending up on an even worse planet. Ichigo is upset at this, but Ryou reminds her that it is not an excuse for trying to kill humans. Ichigo goes on a date with Masaya, which cheers her up, but the next day she is sick with a cold. The girls and Masaya visit, but after he leaves Quiche appears. Ichigo escapes out a window, while the others prepare to battle multiple chimera animas released by Pie and Tart. Too weak to fight, Ichigo is unable to protect herself from Quiche, but is suddenly rescued by a mysterious alien who introduces himself as The Blue Knight.
18	"Midsummer Love! Ichigo's Heart is Swaying" / "My Knight In Blue Armor Part 2"; Transliteration: "Manatsu no koi! Ichigo no hāto wa yurayura" (Japanese: 真夏の恋！いちごのハートはゆらゆら)	Akihiro Enomoto	Masashi Sogo	August 3, 2002	October 8, 2005
While the four Mew Mews are fighting the chimera animas created by Pie and Tart, the Blue Knight battles Quiche. He is injured while protecting Ichigo, but the arrival of the other Mew Mews causes the aliens to retreat. Before leaving, the Blue Knight tells Ichigo that he was born to protect her. Ryou appears out of nowhere to catch Mew Ichigo as she faints from her illness. At the café, the girls wonder who the Blue Knight is, and decide it must be Ryou but he claims he does not know anything about it. While on a date with Masaya, Ichigo is distracted and imagining she is seeing Ryou, but eventually discovers it is actually Retasu and Bu-Ling who were spying on the couple out of concern for Ichigo. After Masaya leaves, Ichigo admits she also believes Ryou is the Blue Knight. That evening while Ichigo is cleaning the café, Ryou surprises her by inviting her to go to the beach.
19	"The Power of Kindness, May the Wish Come True in the Sea Depths" / "A Girl With A Porpoise"; Transliteration: "Yasashisa no chikara, umi no fukaku ni negai yo todoke" (Japanese: 優しさの力、海の深くに願いよ届け)	Hiroaki Nakajima	Tetsuo Tanaka	August 10, 2002	October 15, 2005
At the beach, the girls enjoy swimming and playing in the water. However, Retasu does not know how to swim. A girl named Iruka is being picked on for her inability to swim despite having a name meaning "dolphin". Retasu offers support. Later, Iruka admits her ability to swim but she has a fear of water. To encourage her, Retasu jumps into the water but nearly drowns shaking her confidence. The next day, the aliens attack the beach with chimera animas and cause a storm to appear. During the fight, one of the boys from the day before falls into the water. Iruka jumps in to save him, and Mew Lettuce follows to rescue them both. Struggling to swim, Mew Lettuce's legs change into a porpoise tail, enabling her to swim easily and save the children.
20	"Mother's Memory, the Big Sister's in Trouble" / "Daughter Of The Year"; Transliteration: "Haha no kioku, onēchan wa taihen na noda" (Japanese: 母の記憶、お姉ちゃんは大変なのだ)	Junya Koshiba	Akatsuki Yamatoya	August 17, 2002	October 22, 2005
When Bu-Ling falls sick, Ichigo, Minto, and Retasu agree to go to pick up Bu-Ling's little sister Heicha from school. Heicha's teacher explains that Bu-Ling's mother died and her father is always traveling, so Bu-Ling is the primary caretaker of her five siblings. The little girl refuses to leave the school with the others, but Bu-Ling arrives to get her. The others go with them back home to help care for Bu-Ling's siblings. The next day, Heicha's teacher drives her home and offers to help Bu-Ling, but Bu-Ling declines her offer. Tart appears and steals the teacher's spirit to make a chimera anima. Bu-Ling is still too sick to fight, but the others arrive and defeat it. Later, the teacher offers to drive Heicha to school, but Bu-Ling says she would not get to see the teacher anymore like that. Instead, she asks the teacher if she can pretend to be her mom for a little while.
21	"The Spark of the Heart, Ichigo and Minto at Odds" / "One Flew Out Of The Mew Mew's Nest"; Transliteration: "Kokoro no hibana, Ichigo to Minto no surechigai" (Japanese: 心の火花、いちごとみんとのすれ違い)	Shigeki Hatakeyama	Masashi Sogo	August 24, 2002	October 29, 2005
Minto has a strange dream in which she is talking with her merged animal, the ultramarine lorikeet. Later at the café, Ryou and Keiichirou tell the girls about a substance called mew aqua and its power. After her dream, Minto is concerned about their mission. When she learns the late-arriving Ichigo was on a date with Masaya, she gets angry and stomps out of the café. Later the girls receive a package with Minto's pendant and uniform in it. Zakuro goes to talk to her while the others begin searching for mew aqua. The aliens are also searching for it and find it just as Ichigo, Retasu, and Bu-Ling appear. Quiche merges five parasites into the mew aqua, creating a powerful new chimera anima. The girls are struggling to fight it but Mew Zakuro is able to convince Minto to transform and together they defeat the monster. They learn the mew aqua was a fake and Minto apologizes to Ichigo for her earlier actions.
22	"Farewell Summer, Ichigo's Longest Day" / "Buggin'"; Transliteration: "Natsu yo saraba, Ichigo no ichiban nagai hi" (Japanese: 夏よさらば、いちごの一番長い日)	Jōhei Matsuura	Akatsuki Yamatoya	August 31, 2002	November 5, 2005
As summer break comes to an end, Ichigo has to scramble to finish all of her homework before the start of school. The aliens also are enjoying the last day of summer and are avoiding working, but finally send Tart to continue their plans. Though she has no time left, Ichigo agrees to go on a date with Masaya, but just as she arrives, she is called back to the café to help clean up the mess made by water pipes. Ichigo laments her undone homework but gets no help. Masha detects a chimera anima just before they are attacked by one created by Tart. Angry, Mew Ichigo quickly defeats it, but Tart releases more. Ichigo must spend the rest of the day with the others defeating the monsters, leaving no time to finish her homework.
23	"Love is Sudden! Catch the Heart of a Maiden" / "I've Got A Crush On Mew"; Transliteration: "Koi wa totsuzen! Otome no hāto o uketomete" (Japanese: 恋は突然！ 乙女のハートをうけとめて)	Akihiro Enomoto	Tetsuo Tanaka	September 7, 2002	November 12, 2005
Ichigo discovers that her school friends Moe and Miwa have developed crushes on Ryou and Keiichirou. Though Ichigo fears her friends will be disappointed, she agrees to help them. They make gifts for the boys, but when they go to the café to present them, the boys are busy searching for mew aqua and ignore them. Hurt, the girls run out of the café and Ichigo scolds Ryou and Keiichirou for ignoring the girls' feelings. Quiche appears and creates two chimera animas from the spirits he stole from Miwa and Moe. Ichigo defeats them, and the girls spirits' are restored, but Quiche takes a light out of the lake before he disappears. When Moe and Miwa wake up, Ryou and Keiichirou properly thank them for the gifts. The girls decide to start a fan club for them.
24	"The Wonder Jewel, the Brilliance is in You" / "Diamonds Are A Girl's Worst Enemy"; Transliteration: "Fushigi na hōseki, kagayaki wa anata no naka ni" (Japanese: 不思議な宝石、輝きはあなたの中に)	Hiroaki Nakajima	Natsuko Takahashi	September 14, 2002	2005 (YTV)
Zakuro takes Ichigo to the rehearsal of a jewelry company premiere where she befriends a clumsy crew member named Tsukiko. Tsukiko really wants Zakuro to wear a rainbow stone necklace for the show, but both the stage manager and Zakuro reject it for being too modest. Ryou, Keiichirou, and the aliens all believe the stone is made from mew aqua. During the show, Quiche tries to steal the necklace. The Mew Mews fight for the stone but are having a hard time with the chimera anima Quiche is using until they are helped by the Blue Knight. After the monster is defeated, they discover the stone is not mew aqua. Deciding it is not an ordinary stone, Zakuro arranges for Tsukiko herself to appear in the show wearing a simple white dress and the necklace, proving Tsukiko's claim that the stone can make any girl shine.
25	"Hurdles in Love, Ichigo's Love is Full of Obstacles" / "The Hunt For Blue Aqua Part 1"; Transliteration: "Koi no hādoru, Ichigo no koi wa shōgai-darake" (Japanese: 恋のハードル、いちごの恋は障害だらけ)	Junya Koshiba	Masashi Sogo	September 21, 2002	2005 (YTV)
When Ryou and Keiichirou discover that mew aqua is most likely to be found underground, Ichigo cancels a date with Masaya to search for it. Ryou and Keiichirou decide to use an ancient rod unearthed at the archaeological site where they first learned about the aliens. Meanwhile, the aliens are already underground, searching with chimera animas. Quiche also plants a cocoon at the top of Tokyo Tower. In one month, a moth will hatch from it and release pollutants over Tokyo. Tired from searching for the mew aqua, a grouchy Ichigo accidentally yells at Masaya. When she nearly faints, he takes her to the nurse's office. Talking with him restores her good mood and they agree to go on a date. Later, Ryou lets the girls leave work early, but then Masha and Keiichirou discover the cocoon, and the Mew Mews rush to Tokyo Tower.
26	"Time, Stop! My Heart Overflows with Love" / "Coo Coo Cocoon Part 2"; Transliteration: "Toki yo tomare! Mune ni afureru itoshī kimochi" (Japanese: 時よ止まれ！ 胸にあふれる愛しい気持ち)	Noriyuki Abe	Masashi Sogo	September 28, 2002	2005 (YTV)
The Mew Mews attack the cocoon at the top of Tokyo Tower but are unable to destroy it, and a huge moth hatches from it. It moves too fast for the girls' attacks to hit it, so Mew Ichigo jumps onto its back to try attacking it from there. Quiche interrupts, causing her to fall, but the Blue Knight saves her. The moth begins to release its pollutants, but Ichigo's feelings make the mew aqua react. Sensing it, Quiche pulls it out of the ground, while Ryou gives Mew Ichigo the ancient rod, the Mew Aqua Rod. Using the power of the mew aqua and the rod, Ichigo destroys the moth. However, Quiche is able to send some of the mew aqua used by the attack into the alien dimension, partly revealing Deep Blue's true form. Although it is already past the time she was supposed to meet Masaya, Ichigo returns to normal and rushes to their agreed upon meeting place.

=== Season 2 (2002–03) ===
No.	Title	Directed by	Written by	Original release date
27	"I Love You, Aoyama's Shocking Confession!"; Transliteration: "Anata ga suki, Aoyama-kun shōgeki no kokuhaku!" (Japanese: あなたが好き、 青山くん衝撃の告白！)	Shigeki Hatakeyama	Masashi Sogo	October 5, 2002
Hours late, Ichigo arrives at the meeting place. At first, she thinks Masaya has left, but he appears near her and tells her that he was waiting for her and that he loves her. Ichigo's cat ears pop out, but she hides them with a handkerchief and tells him that she loves him too. The next day, while Masaya is visiting the café, the aliens attack in search of the mew aqua rod. Ryou gives Masaya a sleeping drug to knock him out so the girls can fight. Quiche is able to get the rod, but Keiichirou says the rod does not have any mew aqua anymore anyway. After the aliens leave, everyone begins cleaning the café. Outside, Ichigo bends over the sleeping Masaya and thinks about kissing him. She gets excited and instead of her ears and tail emerging, she turns into a small black cat.
28	"Kitty Panic, the Key to the Secret is the Maiden's Lips"; Transliteration: "Neko panikku, himitsu no kagi wa otome no kuchibiru" (Japanese: ネコパニック、秘密のカギは乙女のくちびる)	Jōhei Matsuura	Masashi Sogo	October 12, 2002
As a cat, Ichigo gets lost while trying to escape from a large amorous cat. She finds herself standing in front of Masaya's house, where he discovers her and takes her inside. That night while he's asleep, she decides to kiss him, but accidentally kisses his dog instead. The kiss turns her back into a human, but before she can escape out a window, the dog licks her and she changes back into a cat again. Outside the house, the large cat finds her again, but she is rescued by a small grey cat wearing a green bandanna. Ichigo falls into the river, but the cat saves her again and tells her his name is Alto before she loses consciousness. She wakes up back on land and in her human form with Ryou bending over her and Alto gone. Ryou tells her that she must defeat the aliens as soon as possible if she wants to stop turning into a cat. While taking her home, he apologizes to her though does not say why.
29	"A Forbidden Love? I Can Understand Cats"; Transliteration: "Kindan no koi? Neko no kotoba ga wakaru nyan" (Japanese: 禁断の恋？ ネコの言葉がわかるニャン)	Yutaka Hirata	Tetsuo Tanaka	October 19, 2002
Ichigo meets a cat at the train station and discovers that, even in her human form, she can understand him. The cat, named Asano, later comes to the café, and tells her that he is searching for the cat he loves, a Lilac Point Siamese named Jacqueline whose owner moved away. The girls agree to help him find her, but learn that her owner has taken her to a cat fair to find her a fiancé. Asano speaks to her there, but she says she cannot leave her owner because she is his most precious memory of his late wife. When one of the other cats is turned into a chimera anima, Asano comes to Jacqueline's aid. After the girls defeat the monster, Jacqueline's owner decides to allow the two cats to be together.
30	"Be Honest, Unrequited Love in a Crystal Ball"; Transliteration: "Sunao ni natte, suishōdama ni himeta kataomoi" (Japanese: 素直になって、水晶玉に秘めた片思い)	Hiroyuki Ishidō	Natsuko Takahashi	October 26, 2002
Ichigo asks for advice on her relationship with Masaya from the school fortune-teller Mariko. At first, Mariko says Masaya is a bad person, but then says he and Ichigo are good for each other as long as Ichigo is honest with her feelings. The next day, Ichigo sees Mariko watching a soccer player named Shunsuke. Later, Mariko tells him that he should confess his feelings to the person he loves on Sunday in the park. Meanwhile, the aliens search for Mariko's crystal ball, believing it contains mew aqua. On Sunday, Ichigo sees Shunsuke in the park and ducks behind a tree, where Mariko is also hiding to see who he meets. Quiche appears and tries to steal Mariko's spirit, but Shunsuke's jumps in front of her to protect her, so his spirit is stolen instead and turned into a chimera anima. The other Mew Mews arrive, along with the Blue Knight, and they defeat the monster, freeing Shunsuke's spirit. Mariko's crystal ball shatters, proving it was not mew aqua. Shunsuke tells Mariko that she is the one he was waiting for.
31	"Father's Back, a One-Game Match with Ichigo On the Line!"; Transliteration: "Chichi no senaka, Ichigo o kaketa ipponshōbu!" (Japanese: 父の背中、いちごをかけた一本勝負！)	Shigeki Hatakeyama	Akatsuki Yamatoya	November 2, 2002
When Ichigo's father finds out that she has a boyfriend, he does not approve. He demands that Masaya defeat him in a kendo match before he will allow them to continue dating. Ichigo complains to her mother, who explains that her father loves her and just wants to protect her. Her mother also tells her that they too had to fight to be together when they were young. Ichigo rushes to stop the fight, reminding her father of the past and how her mother did the same thing for him. Though he does not want to face that his "little girl" is growing up, he grudgingly gives his approval of the relationship.
32	"Princess Fight, the Hero that Money Can't Buy"; Transliteration: "Ojōsama taiketsu, okane ja kaenai seigi no mikata" (Japanese: お嬢さま対決、お金じゃ買えない正義の味方)	Noriyuki Abe	Akatsuki Yamatoya	November 9, 2002
Minto surprises the other girls by inviting them to a tea party. When they arrive, they meet a spoiled, wealthy girl named Kanna, who declares that she is Minto's "eternal rival." A box arrives, containing something Minto wanted to share with everyone. Watching nearby, Quiche believes it must be mew aqua and tries to take the box. Not realizing the danger, Kanna takes the box back. Quiche unleashes a chimera anima and Minto rescues the girl from the monster. The others transform and fight the monster, but are losing until the Blue Knight arrives and reveals its weak point allowing Mew Ichigo and Mew Mint to defeat the monster. Afterwards, Kanna admits she has always envied Minto. The box is opened to reveal that it is a special tea that Minto wanted to share with her friends. They invite Kanna to join them, but she declines and promises to invite them to her house for even better tea.
33	"The Fiancé Appears, Purin's Fated Marriage?!"; Transliteration: "Konyakusha arawaru Purin, shukumei no kekkon?!" (Japanese: 婚約者現わる 歩鈴、宿命の結婚？！)	Jōhei Matsuura	Tetsuo Tanaka	November 16, 2002
While the Mew Mews are battling one of Tart's chimera animas, a young man named Yuebin Ron appears and defeats it with his bare hands. An apprentice of Bu-Ling's father, he has come to spend a night competing with Bu-Ling so that he can be the successor of the family's fighting style. He defeats Bu-Ling, and tells her that she must also now become his fiancée. While talking, he accidentally knocks over Bu-Ling's photo album and damages it. Upset, Bu-Ling locks herself in the café where Tart attacks her. While the other girls are stuck fighting Quiche and defeat his chimera anima, Yuebin rescues Bu-Ling. Afterwards, Yuebin goes to China to continue his training so he can be strong enough to protect his future wife.
34	"The Most Important Thing, to Believe in Someone"; Transliteration: "Ichiban taisetsu na koto, dareka o shinjiru kimochi" (Japanese: 一番大切な事、誰かを信じる気持ち)	Miki Fujimoto	Masashi Sogo	November 23, 2002
The girls participate in an open market where Retasu sells a variety of dolls that she made herself, which are popular with the crowd. The last doll is purchased by famous doll maker Ayano Uemura who invites Retasu to work with her at her workshop. Retasu happily accepts and they make a doll together that Ayano takes to an exhibition. When the girls go to see the doll, they discover that Ayano took all of the credit for making it and denies that Retasu helped her. Quiche appears and steals Ayano's spirit to make a chimera anima. The girls transform and defeat the monster, returning Ayano to normal. Afterwards, Ayano confesses that she was envious of Retasu's talent and had run out of new ideas. Retasu forgives her, and tells her she does not care whose name is on the doll as long as it makes people happy.
35	"Don't Cry, Lonely Little Zakuro"; Transliteration: "Nakanaide, hitoribotchi no chīsana Zakuro" (Japanese: 泣かないで、ひとりぼっちの小さなざくろ)	Akihiro Enomoto	Natsuko Takahashi	November 30, 2002
Ichigo meets a lonely girl named Momoka whose parents are always busy. Ichigo learns she is a fan of Zakuro, so she tells Zakuro about the girl. Zakuro later runs into the girl at a restaurant. Momoka is upset at learning her parents have cancelled their dinner plans, but Zakuro assures her that her parents still love her and invites the girl to have dinner with her instead. The next day, Momoka's parents send her a beautiful pendant that Quiche believes is made of mew aqua. When the daycare holds a family picnic, Momoka's parents do not show up and the upset girl runs off. Along the way, she loses the handkerchief that Zakuro gave her. Quiche offers to help her, if she gives him her pendant. Zakuro arrives to help her, but is entangled in some vines by Quiche. After realizing the pendant contains no Mew Aqua, Quiche leaves. Zakuro returns the handkerchief and pendant to Momoka. Her parents arrive for the picnic, and Zakuro feels certain they will not leave her alone again.
36	"Shirogane's Past, the Secret of the Mew Mews' Birth!"; Transliteration: "Shirogane no kako, Myūmyū tanjō no himitsu!!" (Japanese: 白金の過去、ミュウミュウ誕生の秘密！！)	Junya Koshiba	Akatsuki Yamatoya	December 7, 2002
Ichigo tries to talk to Ryou about the problems caused by her cat genes, but he ignores her. On the way to school, Ichigo changes into a cat again and gets in trouble, but is saved by Alto who also kisses her to change her back to normal. Despite his struggling, Ichigo picks him up and is shocked when he suddenly changes into Ryou. After school, she goes to the café where Keiichirou tells her the history of the Mew Project, which was started by Ryou's father. After his parents were killed by an ancient chimera anima, Ryou decided to continue his father's research. Wanting to be sure the merging process was safe, he tested it by merging himself with cat genes. This gave him the ability to change into a cat at will, but only for 10 minutes at a time or he will remain a cat permanently. Ichigo promises to do her best as a Mew Mew.
37	"Tears of Brilliance, a Christmas for Two"; Transliteration: "Kagayaki no namida, futarikiri no kurisumasu" (Japanese: 輝きの涙、二人きりのクリスマス)	Shigeki Hatakeyama	Tetsuo Tanaka	December 14, 2002
As Christmas approaches, Ichigo grows depressed as she thinks about how she is regularly lying to Masaya to hide her being a Mew Mew. Zakuro invites her to go shopping with her and tells Ichigo that since she cannot open her heart, she should give Masaya something that reflects her feelings. Ichigo chooses a necklace called "Tears for Christmas." She is still initially reluctant to face him, but finally arranges to meet him at the big Christmas tree in Odaiba. While she is waiting, the aliens attack. When Ichigo transforms, her emotions cause mew aqua to materialize at the top of the tree. Joined by the others, the Mew Mews prepare to fight the aliens to acquire it.
38	"Miracle of the Holy Night, the Night of Vanished Secrets"; Transliteration: "Seiya no kiseki, himitsu no kieta yoru" (Japanese: 聖夜の奇跡、秘密の消えた夜)	Junya Koshiba	Masashi Sogo	December 21, 2002
The aliens add more energy to the mew aqua, putting the area in danger of being destroyed. The Mew Mews are able to reduce the power of the explosion, however no one had noticed Masaya was nearby. He is hit by one of the fragments of the mew aqua and knocked unconscious. At the hospital, Ichigo watches over him and talks to him, telling him she is sorry for hiding the truth from him. As she cries, the mew aqua reacts and it begins snowing. Masaya wakes up and they return to the tree where Ichigo tells Masaya the truth about her being a Mew Mew. Masaya tells her that he already knew, and that it does not bother him. He pretended not to know because it was what she seemed to want. Ichigo gives him the necklace.
39	"Stolen Dreams, the Sweet Lavender Trap"; Transliteration: "Nusumareta yume, rabendā no amai wana" (Japanese: 盗まれた夢、ラベンダーの甘い罠)	Hiroaki Nakajima	Tetsuo Tanaka	December 28, 2002
Pie creates a chimera anima capable of manipulating dreams. The monster puts Ichigo to sleep and reforms itself into a replica of her to go to the café and send the other four girls into Ichigo's dreams. They transform, but as the dream is being manipulated by the chimera anima, their attacks are sent back at them. They realize that they must wake Ichigo up to win, but are unable to do so. Quiche suddenly stops Pie from killing Ichigo and wakes her up, freeing the others. After they defeat the chimera anima, Quiche tries to kill Mew Ichigo, but he is still too injured from his last battle with the Blue Knight. Ichigo yells at the aliens, but they tell her they are fighting for their friends. The Mew Mews realize that the aliens do have their own feelings and something they are trying to protect, the same as them.
40	"You Two Are Friends? Purin in Imminent Danger!"; Transliteration: "Futari wa tomodachi? Purin, kikiippatsu!!" (Japanese: 二人は友達？歩鈴、危機一髪！！)	Jōhei Matsuura	Akatsuki Yamatoya	January 4, 2003
Masaya is having weird dreams in which an unidentified voice is telling him to wake up. Meanwhile, Bu-Ling is watching performance at the Tokyo Dome when a huge hole opens in the floor. She transforms and investigates, finding Tart under the Dome. He tells her they are going to make the whole area collapse by having chimera animas dig holes under it, starting with the Dome. While showing off his monster, it goes out of control and leaves, trapping Mew Pudding and Tart inside by falling debris. Mew Pudding is happy, though, and tells Tart that since they are both trapped, they do not need to fight. She gives him some candy and starts calling him "Taru-taru." Outside, the other Mew Mews defeat the chimera anima then use their powers to keep the dome from collapsing while it is evacuated. Tart decides it would be boring if Bu-Ling died, so uses his powers to make trees grow around the Dome so the roots support it. He teleports Bu-Ling to the surface and she says they are friends now. He yells at her and leaves, but smiles while looking at the candy she gave him.
41	"The Winds that Brings Happiness, an Earnest Prayer"; Transliteration: "Shiawase o hakobu kaze, ichizu na inori" (Japanese: 幸せを運ぶ風、一途な祈り)	Akihiro Enomoto	Natsuko Takahashi	January 11, 2003
The aliens decide to use special chimera animas to release pollutants into Tokyo Bay. The Mew Mews arrive, sans Retasu, and find themselves having to fight numerous smaller chimera animas made from fish. Mew Lettuce and Ryou arrive by boat, but the larger monster destroys it and they are thrown into the water. While the others defeat the fish monsters by combining Minto and Bu-Ling's attacks, Retasu tries to save the drowning Ryou. Her emotions activate the mew aqua around his neck, causing her legs change to a porpoise fin and easily bring Ryou back to the surface. The mew aqua weakens the remaining chimera anima, enabling them to defeat it.
42	"Zakuro's Dilemma, Only Four Mew Mews Now"; Transliteration: "Zakuro no mayoi, yonin ni natta Myūmyū" (Japanese: ざくろの迷い、四人になったミュウミュウ)	Shigeki Hatakeyama	Masashi Sogo	January 18, 2003
Zakuro is offered a leading role in a movie in Hollywood, but this would require her to move to America. She has not decided whether to take the job or not, but she tells Ichigo that the girls still know nothing about saving the Earth and that she is losing patience with them. Meanwhile, Quiche learns that the conditions on his planet have gotten worse and that he must hurry to find the mew aqua so he can save his people. The girls also renew their search for mew aqua, however when the aliens appear, Zakuro refuses to transform. Mew Mint is hurt while protecting Zakuro, but Zakuro does nothing. After the battle at the café, Ichigo complains to Ryou who acts indifferent. The girls decide to confront Zakuro about her behavior. Masha leads them to a church where they find Zakuro with Quiche.
43	"Friend or Foe? Fight, Big Sister!"; Transliteration: "Teki ka mikata ka? Tatakatte onēsama!!" (Japanese: 敵か味方か？戦ってお姉さま！！)	Hiroyuki Ishidō	Masashi Sogo	January 25, 2003
Quiche tells the girls that Zakuro has betrayed them, and then invites Zakuro to join them. Ichigo yells at Quiche, and he tells her more about Deep Blue, their "god" and that the mew aqua is needed to help him awaken, before teleporting away with Zakuro. Ryou calls the rest of the Mew Mews to a bird sanctuary, where they believe a swan is holding the mew aqua. As they try to figure out how to find the swan, all of the birds in the area gather near, realizing Minto can understand them. As the swan is about to bring them the mew aqua, the aliens attack but Minto refuses to transform. The swan flies up to her and honks at her, but Minto refuses to listen. It absorbs the mew aqua and flies away. Afterwards, she explains the birds were crying for help. Ichigo still believes Zakuro has not betrayed them; Minto says people change. That night at the café, Ryou reveals that Zakuro told him she felt they were still little girls, and not the true warriors they would need to be to protect the Earth. The girls rush off to the sanctuary to stop Mew Zakuro and Mew Mint, who have begun fighting one another. As Mew Ichigo tries to calm Minto down, a twister created by the alien appears that sucks in all the birds. Mew Mint flies into the twister and retrieves the mew aqua from the swan. Mew Ichigo uses its power to stop the twister and the aliens retreat. Zakuro apologizes and explains that she was bothered the girls were listening to rumors instead of believing in one another.
44	"The City that Became a Forest! What Keeps Ichigo Smiling"; Transliteration: "Mori ni natta machi! Ichigo no egao o mamoru mono" (Japanese: 森になった街！いちごの笑顔を守るもの)	Miki Fujimoto	Tetsuo Tanaka	February 1, 2003
Ryou and Keiichirou learn that mew aqua may have been made by the aliens when they inhabited Earth. A strange type of energy begins emerging in Tokyo and trees grow out of control, turning the city into a forest. The Mew Mews find something that appears to be a large mew aqua in a tree but before they collect it, Tart arrives and turns the tree into a chimera anima. During the fight, Mew Ichigo realizes that Ryou cannot be the Blue Knight as they both appear at the battle to aid her. The Mew Mews defeat the monster, but they are unable to figure out what caused the forest to appear in the first place.
45	"Mystery Solved! The Truth about the Blue Knight"; Transliteration: "Hodoketa nazo! Ao no kishi no shinjitsu" (Japanese: 解けた謎！蒼の騎士の真実)	Junya Koshiba	Natsuko Takahashi	February 8, 2003
For Valentine's Day, Ichigo decides to make chocolate for Masaya, with help from Keiichirou. On her way to meet him, she is attacked by Quiche who knocks away her transformation pendant. Masaya senses that Ichigo is danger and comes to her rescue. After Quiche injures him, Masaya begins glowing and transforms into the Blue Knight, however with the injury he is unable to fight at his full strength. Just as Quiche is about to kill him, Ichigo grabs her pendant and runs in front Masaya to block the attack using a shield from the pendant. Ichigo rejects Quiche and he leaves. Later, as Masaya enjoys the chocolates from Ichigo, Quiche wonders who or what Masaya and the Blue Knight really are.
46	"A New Reinforcement! The Comrades Who Protect the Earth!"; Transliteration: "Atarashī senryoku! Chikyū o mamoru nakama" (Japanese: 新しい戦力！地球を守る仲間)	Jōhei Matsuura	Masashi Sogo	February 15, 2003
Masaya begins having prophetic dreams, including one where he is invited to join the team and one where he sees Ichigo crying. The next day, his first dream comes true, against Ryou's protests and Zakuro's concerns, and he becomes a member of the Mew Project. The group goes to investigate a strange light being emitted from a river to determine if it is mew aqua. The aliens also go to the river. As the two groups battle, Mew Pudding and Tart both jump into the river to look for the mew aqua, eventually discovering there is none. After Mew Ichigo uses her attack to increase the Blue Knight's sword's power, he destroys the many chimera animas being used by Pie. The light disappears and the aliens leave as the Mew Mew wonder what is going on.
47	"The Power of Love! I'll Protect You, Aoyama!"; Transliteration: "Ai no pawā! Aoyama-kun wa watashi ga mamoru!!" (Japanese: 愛のパワー！青山君は私が守る！！)	Junya Koshiba	Akatsuki Yamatoya	February 22, 2003
Deep Blue orders the aliens to destroy the Blue Knight. They decide to kidnap Mew Ichigo in order to draw him out. Meanwhile, Ichigo is happy to have Masaya now working at the Cafe Mew Mew. The next day, the aliens attack with a chimera anima that resembles a large octopus. Masaya, as the Blue Knight, joins the Mew Mews in the battle. The creature captures the Mew Mews and the Blue Knight is forced to drop his sword when Pie and Tart threaten to kill Ichigo. It is able to capture the Mew Mews, including Ichigo, in its arms. Pie and Tart force the Blue Knight to kill Ichigo. The aliens then repeatedly attack him, but before they can kill him, Mew Ichigo suddenly breaks free and attacks the aliens with an unbelievable new power. As Pie and Tart flee, the nearby Quiche wonders where the power came from, as he is certain it did not come from Ichigo.
48	"A Maze in Another Dimension! Quiche's Gamble!"; Transliteration: "Ijigen no meiro! Kisshu no kake!!" (Japanese: 異次元の迷路！キッシュの賭け！！)	Akihiro Enomoto	Tetsuo Tanaka	March 1, 2003
The group is searching for mew aqua around a large rock formation in the forest when the girls and Masaya get separated. Something strange begins happening and everyone transforms. Masaya transforms into the Blue Knight, but falls from the rock and returns to normal. Quiche confronts him and reveals that he cannot maintain his Blue Knight form if he is not protecting Ichigo. The alien moves to kill Masaya, but Mew Ichigo transports and appears between them. Masaya is knocked unconscious as Quiche tries to kill Ichigo. This triggers Masaya's transformation, but his powers go out of control due to his rage at Quiche. The other Mew Mews teleport to Mew Ichigo just in time to put up a shield around her as the rock explodes from the Blue Knight's power. Masaya returns to normal, seemingly unharmed. Quiche tells Pie and Tart that the Blue Knight is the one who can save them.
49	"The Blue Awakening, Another Appearance!"; Transliteration: "Ao no mezame, mō hitotsu no sugata!" (Japanese: 青の目覚め、もうひとつの姿！)	Shigeki Hatakeyama	Akatsuki Yamatoya	March 8, 2003
Ryou and Keiichirou tell the girls to take a vacation, feeling the final battle is approaching and wanting them to be refreshed. Ichigo, however, cannot find Masaya to enjoy the downtime with. Meanwhile, Quiche tells Pie and Tart that he is going to use the Blue Knight's powers rather than waiting for Deep Blue to awaken. Pie disagrees, but Tart is convinced. They release all the chimera animas they have in order to distract the Mew Mews and the Blue Knight, while the aliens search for Masaya. Ryou realizes it is a trap and sends the Mew Mews to find Masaya as well. When the girls eventually find him, he is lying unconscious. Mew Ichigo approaches him, but he transforms into the Blue Knight. All of the strange energy in the city gathers around him and he transforms again, into Deep Blue.
50	"Ichigo's Trial! I Am a Mew Mew"; Transliteration: "Ichigo no shiren! Atashi wa myūmyū" (Japanese: いちごの試練！あたしはミュウミュウ)	Katsuyoshi Yatabe	Natsuko Takahashi	March 15, 2003
As Ichigo stands in disbelief that Masaya is Deep Blue, Pie explains why they have been waiting for him. Ichigo tries to reach Masaya, showing him the bell collar, but it is useless. Unable to fight him, the other Mew Mews rush to protect Ichigo as the alien attacks her, eventually being wounded enough that they are forced back into their human forms. When Deep Blue uses his sword to destroy Tokyo, Ichigo finally realizes he is not Masaya anymore and attacks, but he is too strong. Ryou arrives and protects her from his attack, then tells her that everything is just as the Earth wanted it to be, that the planet chose her and the other Mew Mews to protect it. Her determination renewed, the final battle begins.
51	"The Final Battle! I Believe in Your Smile"; Transliteration: "Saigo no tatakai! Anata no egao o shinjiteru" (Japanese: 最後の戦い！あなたの笑顔を信じてる)	Hiroyuki Ishidō	Masashi Sogo	March 22, 2003
Deep Blue teleports to his base, where Keiichirou detects the final mew aqua. Pie creates a chimera anima similar to the one that killed Ryou's parents. As the Mew Mew's battle, Mew Ichigo tries to reach Deep Blue's base. Pie goes after her, but Tart protects her and is killed by Pie. Ichigo reaches the room with the mew aqua just as Deep Blue does and he attacks. Quiche appears and pretends he is going to kill Mew Ichigo, but instead teleports right in front of Deep Blue and tries to attack. Deep Blue dodges the attack and kills him. Quiche dies in Ichigo's arms as she cries, mirroring Masaya's prophetic dream. Deep Blue begins screaming and releasing tremendous amounts of energy. It knocks Ichigo unconscious and destroys all of the chimera animas and everything else around the base. Pie uses his fans to protect the Mew Mews, at the cost of his own life. Inside the base, Mew Ichigo comes to and finds Deep Blue standing in front of her. He drops his sword and calls her by name, revealing Masaya has regained control of the body.
52	"We Serve the Future of the Earth!"; Transliteration: "Chikyū no mirai ni, go hōshi suru nyan!" (Japanese: 地球の未来に、ご奉仕するにゃん！)	Junya Koshiba	Masashi Sogo	March 29, 2003
Masaya and Ichigo realize that the final mew aqua is inside his body. Deep Blue's spirit remerges, despite Masaya's attempts to regain control. Eventually, Deep Blue wins and claims to have destroyed Masaya completely. He goes to activate the mew aqua so he can destroy the Earth. Masaya's spirit emerges from his body, pulling Deep Blue's spirit out as well. He tells Ichigo to attack, knowing it will kill both of them. Before he dies, he tells Ichigo he wanted to save the Earth and that he loves her. With Deep Blue's death, the mew aqua is released, healing the destroyed city, the Mew Mews' wounds, and reviving the dead aliens. Masaya's body is returned to normal. Unwilling to let him die, Ichigo kisses him and gives him all of her power. Masaya awakens to find Ichigo lying beside him, dead. The other Mew Mews teleport into the base and begin crying over her death. They suddenly return to their normal forms as the base begins to fall apart. Quiche appears with the last of the mew aqua. Pie and Tart also come and they thank the girls before teleporting them safely to the ground. The three aliens destroy the base to prevent it from falling on the city, then leave to return to their own world. Masaya kisses Ichigo. She detransforms and wakes up, to everyone's delight. The girls believe that they have lost their powers permanently, but discover that they only faded temporarily and are told that they have a new enemy.

== Home media ==
=== Japanese ===
==== VHS ====
Pony Canyon (Japan, VHS)
Volume		Episodes	Release date	Ref.
東京ミュウミュウ	1	01–04	July 17, 2002	
東京ミュウミュウ	2	05–08	August 21, 2002	
東京ミュウミュウ	3	09–12	September 19, 2002	
東京ミュウミュウ	4	13–16		
東京ミュウミュウ	5	17–20		
東京ミュウミュウ	6	21–24		
東京ミュウミュウ	7	25–28		
東京ミュウミュウ	8	29–32		
東京ミュウミュウ	9	33–36		
東京ミュウミュウ	10	37–40		
東京ミュウミュウ	11	41–44		
東京ミュウミュウ	12	45–48		
東京ミュウミュウ	13	49–52		

== See also ==
- List of Tokyo Mew Mew chapters
- List of Tokyo Mew Mew characters
- List of Tokyo Mew Mew New episodes
