= Satoshi Hino =

Japanese voice actor

- 日野 聡
- Born: August 4, 1978 (age 48); San Francisco, California, U.S.
- Occupation: Voice actor
- Years active: 2000–present
- Agent: Axl-One
- Notable work: Overlord as Ainz Ooal Gown; Bakuman as Akito Takagi; Shakugan no Shana as Yuji Sakai; The Familiar of Zero as Saito Hiraga; Bleach as Lille Barro; Haikyu!! as Daichi Sawamura; Naruto: Shippuden as Sai; A Certain Magical Index as Shiage Hamazura; Beyblade Metal Fusion as Kyoya Tategami; Black Clover as Gauche Adlai, En Ringard; Gintama as Kamui; Honkai: Star Rail as Phainon; Yowamushi Pedal as Hayato Shinkai; Demon Slayer: Kimetsu no Yaiba as Kyōjurō Rengoku
- Spouse: Saki Nakajima (m. 2014)
- Children: 2

Satoshi Hino (日野 聡, Hino Satoshi; born August 4, 1978) is a Japanese voice actor. He is known for his roles in various anime series, such as Shakugan no Shana, The Familiar of Zero, Gintama, Nabari no Ou, Naruto Shippuuden, Overlord, and Yowamushi Pedal.

== Personal life ==
Hino lived in San Francisco until the age of five. He moved to Tokyo.

In January 2015, he announced on his blog that he married Saki Nakajima in 2014. On September 3, 2020, both Hino and Nakajima formally announced that not only are they parents, but also tweeted the arrival of their second child. He is a first dan in kendo.

== Career ==
He was a member of the Children's Theater Company when he was a teenager. Hino originally aimed to be a stage actor, but changed goals to become a voice actor in earnest following his participation in the dubbing of the American drama television series ER. In 2001, he played his first lead role as Eddie in the overseas drama Wanda Eddy broadcast on NHK Educational TV.

While initially not aware of dubbing's connection to anime, he was called to the audition for, and eventually secured a role in, Ikki Tousen, a work in which the dubbing director participated. Hino has performed as a voice actor in various fields such as dubbing, animation, games and narration. Until June 2011, he was affiliated with Production Baobab. Hino joined Axl-One in July 2011.

== Filmography ==
=== Anime series ===
2003

- Ikki Tousen, Kokin Shuyu
- Nitaboh, Nitaro/Nitaboh

2004

- Meine Liebe, Anri
- Yakitate!! Japan, Masanobu Tsutsumi
- Yu-Gi-Oh! Duel Monsters GX, Kagurazaka

2005

- Shakugan no Shana, Yūji Sakai
- Trinity Blood, Abel (young)
- Da Capo: Second Season, Furuta

2006

- Asatte no Hōkō, Hiro Iokawa
- Hell Girl: Two Mirrors, Seiichi Meshiai
- Project Sylpheed, Katana Faraway
- The Familiar of Zero, Saito Hiraga
- Reborn!, Arachide
- Naruto, Akio

2007

- Hayate the Combat Butler, Kyonosuke Kaoru
- Kimikiss Pure Rouge, Kōichi Sanada
- Naruto Shippuden 2007–2017, Sai, Shiba
- Shakugan no Shana II, Yūji Sakai
- The Familiar of Zero: Knight of the Twin Moons, Saito Hiraga

2008

- Cross Edge, Yūto Kannagi
- Nabari no Ou, Kōichi Aizawa
- Nodame Cantabile: Paris, Li Yunlong
- The Familiar of Zero: Rondo of Princesses, Saito Hiraga
- Black Butler, Ash Landers

2009

- First Love Limited, Yoshihiko Bessho
- Gintama, Kamui
- Beyblade: Metal Fusion, Kyoya Tategami
- Taishō Baseball Girls, Saburou Kitani
- Tayutama: Kiss on my Deity, Yuuri Mito
- La Corda d'Oro: Secondo Passo, Kiriya Eto

2010

- Hanamaru Kindergarten, Naozumi Tsuchida
- Bakuman, Akito Takagi
- Cat Shit One, Botasky
- The Legend of the Legendary Heroes, Luke Stokkart
- Otome Yōkai Zakuro, Riken Yoshinokazura
- A Certain Magical Index II, Shiage Hamazura
- The Betrayal Knows My Name, Senshiro Furuori
- Mazinkaizer SKL, Ryo Magami
- Highschool of the Dead, Tsunoda
- Beyblade: Metal Masters, Kyoya Tategami

2011

- Bakuman 2, Akito Takagi
- Mayo Chiki!, Kinjirō Sakamachi
- Beyblade Metal Fury, Kyoya Tategami
- Gintama, Kamui
- Sket Dance, Akitoshi Daimon
- Shakugan no Shana III Final, Yūji Sakai
- Working'!!, Kirio Yamada

2012

- Accel World, Rust Jigsaw
- The Familiar of Zero F, Saito Hiraga
- Hesthetica of a Rogue Hero, Ryohei Uesaki
- Rock Lee & His Ninja Pals, Sai
- Bakuman 3, Akito Takagi
- Code Geass: Akito the Exiled, Ryou Sayama
- The Pet Girl of Sakurasou, Sōichirō Tatebayashi
- Dramatical Murder, Noiz

2013

- Aikatsu!, King
- Amnesia, Toma
- Cuticle Detective Inaba, Hamada Iyori
- Hakkenden: Eight Dogs of the East, Sosuke Inukawa/Ao
- Gifuu Doudou!! Kanetsugu to Keiji, Miyoshi Nagayoshi
- Hayate the Combat Butler! Cuties, Kyounosuke Kaoru
- Yu-Gi-Oh! Zexal, Rei Shingetsu/Vector
- Magi: The Labyrinth of Magic, Koumei Ren
- Log Horizon, Issac
- Yowamushi Pedal, Hayato Shinkai

2014

- Haikyu!!, Daichi Sawamura
- Rail Wars!, Shō Iwaizumi
- La Corda d'Oro: Blue Sky, Leiji Myoga, Kiriya Eto
- Dramatical Murder, Noiz
- Naruto Shippuden, Byakuren
- Future Card Buddyfight, Kyoya Gaen
- Gugure! Kokkuri-san, Kureha's Lover
- Francesca, Yoshitsune Minamoto
- Inari Kon Kon, Shishi
- Yowamushi Pedal Grande Road, Hayato Shinkai
- Akame ga Kill!, Ibara
- Amagi Brilliant Park, Dornel
- Monthly Girls' Nozaki-kun, Tomoda

2015

- Plastic Memories, Constance
- Samurai Warriors, Ōtani Yoshitsugu
- Overlord, Momonga/Ainz Ooal Gown
- My Teen Romantic Comedy SNAFU, Tamanawa
- Go! Princess PreCure, Shut
- Absolute Duo, Clovis
- One-Punch Man, Superalloy Blackluster
- Lovely Muco, Komatsu-san
- Gintama, Kamui
- Working!!!, Kirio Yamada
- Haikyu!! 2, Daichi Sawamura

2016

- Haikyū!! 3, Daichi Sawamura
- The Disastrous Life of Saiki K., Kineshi Hairo
- Yuri!!! on Ice, Emil Nekola
- The Heroic Legend of Arslan: Dust Storm Dance, Merlane

2017

- ACCA: 13-Territory Inspection Dept., Warbler
- Atom: The Beginning, Reckless Takeshi
- Boruto, Sai
- Classroom of the Elite, Kohei Katsuragi
- The Ancient Magus' Bride, Mikhail Renfred
- Gintama., Kamui
- Chain Chronicle: The Light of Haecceitas, Rafalgar
- Tales of Zestiria the X Season 2, Michael
- A Sister's All You Need, Haruto Fuwa
- King's Game, Takuya Sakamoto
- Yowamushi Pedal: New Generation, Hayato Shinkai

2018

- Black Clover, Gauche Adlai, En Ringard
- Record of Grancrest War, Lassic David
- Overlord II, Ainz Ooal Gown
- Overlord III, Ainz Ooal Gown
- The Disastrous Life of Saiki K. 2, Kineshi Hairo
- Devils' Line, Ryusei Yanagi
- Cells at Work!, Teacher Neutrophil
- Kakuriyo: Bed and Breakfast for Spirits, Raijū
- 100 Sleeping Princes and the Kingdom of Dreams, Gary
- Kitsune no Koe, Ji Hetian
- A Certain Magical Index III, Shiage Hamazura
- Gintama.: Shirogane no Tamashii-hen 2, Kamui
- Back Street Girls: Gokudolls, Ryuu Tachibana
- High School DxD Hero, Rudiger Rosenkreutz
- School Babysitters, Kosuke Mamizuka
- Yowamushi Pedal: Glory Line, Hayato Shinkai
- Ulysses: Jeanne d'Arc and the Alchemist Knight, Henry V
- Free! Dive to the Future, Nao Serizawa
- Run with the Wind, Kazuma Fujioka
- Lord of Vermilion: The Crimson King, Dōmyōji Kotetsu
- As Miss Beelzebub Likes, Azazel

2019

- The Quintessential Quintuplets, Isanari Uesugi
- Isekai Quartet, Ainz Ooal Gown
- One-Punch Man 2, Superalloy Blackluster
- Fire Force, Foien Li
- Kochoki: Wakaki Nobunaga, Tsuzuki Kurando
- High Score Girl II, Masaru
- Isekai Cheat Magician, Inimeex
- Didn't I Say to Make My Abilities Average in the Next Life?!, Elbert
- Vinland Saga, Willibald
- Demon Slayer: Kimetsu no Yaiba, Kyōjurō Rengoku
- Ascendance of a Bookworm, Otto

2020

- A Certain Scientific Railgun T, Shiage Hamazura
- Infinite Dendrogram, Shu Starling
- Isekai Quartet 2, Ainz Ooal Gown
- Haikyū!! 4, Daichi Sawamura
- Plunderer, Taketora Douan
- Ascendance of a Bookworm: Part II, Otto
- Komatta Jii-san, Old Man
- Tomica Kizuna Gattai: Earth Granner, Gao Granner Eagle
- Moriarty the Patriot, Sebastian Moran
- My Teen Romantic Comedy SNAFU Fin, Tamanawa
- Jujutsu Kaisen, Noritoshi Kamo

2021

- Suppose a Kid from the Last Dungeon Boonies Moved to a Starter Town, Merthophan
- Skate-Leading Stars, Shotaro Terauchi
- That Time I Got Reincarnated as a Slime Season 2, Grucius
- Log Horizon: Destruction of the Round Table, Issac
- Full Dive, Tesla
- Tokyo Revengers, Masataka "Kiyomasa" Kiyomizu
- The Aquatope on White Sand, Tetsuji Suwa
- Muteking the Dancing Hero, Seo
- Irina: The Vampire Cosmonaut, Mikhail Yashin
- The Fruit of Evolution, Xelos, the Noble of the Darkness
- Build Divide -#00000 (Code Black)-, Loinel
- Takt Op. Destiny, Lenny

2022

- Orient, Naotora Takeda
- Requiem of the Rose King, William Catesby
- The Strongest Sage with the Weakest Crest, Ayrias
- World's End Harem, Ryuu Mizuhara
- Life with an Ordinary Guy Who Reincarnated into a Total Fantasy Knockout, Tsukasa Jinguuji
- Ascendance of a Bookworm: Part III, Otto
- Classroom of the Elite 2nd Season, Kohei Katsuragi
- Overlord IV, Ainz Ooal Gown
- Nights with a Cat, Fuuta
- Bleach: Thousand-Year Blood War, Lille Barro

2023

- Campfire Cooking in Another World with My Absurd Skill, Fel
- The Ancient Magus' Bride 2nd Season, Mikhail Renfred
- Sacrificial Princess and the King of Beasts, Leonhart
- Sorcerous Stabber Orphen: Sanctuary Arc, Pluto
- Tokyo Mew Mew New, Ichigo Momomiya's father
- Rurouni Kenshin, Saitō Hajime
- Reign of the Seven Spellblades, Alvin Godfrey
- The Kingdoms of Ruin, Yamato
- Jujutsu Kaisen Season 2, Noritoshi Kamo
- A Playthrough of a Certain Dude's VRMMO Life, Skeleton Knight

2024

- Classroom of the Elite 3rd Season, Kohei Katsuragi
- Doctor Elise, Ron
- One Piece, Prince Grus
- Yatagarasu: The Raven Does Not Choose Its Master, Natsuka
- Chillin' in Another World with Level 2 Super Cheat Powers, Flio
- Bye Bye, Earth, Gaf Shandy
- Blue Lock vs. U-20 Japan, Oliver Aiku
- Demon Lord 2099, Demon Lord Veltol
- Goodbye, Dragon Life, Georg
- Haigakura, Sontō

2025

- Promise of Wizard, Bradley
- Orb: On the Movements of the Earth, Schmidt
- I Left My A-Rank Party to Help My Former Students Reach the Dungeon Depths!, Saga
- Lazarus, Billy
- Princession Orchestra, Seishirō Sorano
- Sakamoto Days, Kanaguri
- Gachiakuta, Gris
- Yano-kun's Ordinary Days, Yano's father

2026

- Hana-Kimi, Makoto Kagurazaka
- Agents of the Four Seasons: Dance of Spring, Itechō Kangetsu
- Ghost Concert: Missing Songs, Setsutei
- Star Detective Precure!, Usonoir
- Nia Liston: The Merciless Maiden, Gandolf Rogen

2027

- SSS-Class Revival Hunter, Sword Emperor
- Kindergarten Wars, Luke

=== Original net animation ===
- Akame ga Kill! Theater (2014), Ibara
- Kare Baka (2015), Peruhiko Saijō
- The Disastrous Life of Saiki K.: Reawakened (2019), Kineshi Hairo
- Powerful Pro Yakyū Powerful Kōkō-hen (2021), Yūto Saiga
- The Way of the Househusband (2021), Miku's Father
- JoJo's Bizarre Adventure: Stone Ocean (2021), Johngalli A.
- Thermae Romae Novae (2022), Regulus
- Dandelion (2026), Inuyama

=== Original video animation ===
- Air Gear (2010), Black Burn
- Re:Zero – Starting Life in Another World: Hyōketsu no Kizuna (2019), Chap
- Arifureta: From Commonplace to World's Strongest (2022), Naiz Gruen

=== Special ===
- Amagi Brilliant Park: Nonbirishiteiru Hima ga Nai! (2015), Dornel
- Working!!!: Lord of the Takanashi (2016), Kirio Yamada
- The Disastrous Life of Saiki K. Final Arc (2018), Kineshi Hairo

=== Television drama ===
- The Way of the Househusband (2020), Narrator (ep. 2)

=== Anime films ===
- Naruto Shippuden 2: Bonds, Sai (2008)
- Naruto Shippuden 3: Inheritors of the Will of Fire, Sai (2009)
- Naruto Shippuden 4: The Lost Tower, Sai (2010)
- Naruto the Movie: Blood Prison, Sai (2011)
- Road to Ninja: Naruto the Movie, Sai (2012)
- The Last: Naruto the Movie, Sai (2014)
- Boruto: Naruto the Movie, Sai (2015)
- Yu-Gi-Oh!: The Dark Side of Dimensions, Mani (2016)
- Free! -Take Your Marks-, Nao Serizawa (2017)
- Free! Road to the World - the Dream, Nao Serizawa (2019)
- Demon Slayer: Kimetsu no Yaiba – The Movie: Mugen Train, Kyōjurō Rengoku (2020)
- Pretty Guardian Sailor Moon Eternal: The Movie -Part 1-, Tiger's Eye (2021)
- Jujutsu Kaisen 0, Noritoshi Kamo (2021)
- Sing a Bit of Harmony (2021), Thunder
- The Quintessential Quintuplets Movie (2022), Isanari Uesugi
- Black Clover: Sword of the Wizard King (2023), Gauche Adlai
- Haikyu!! The Dumpster Battle (2024), Daichi Sawamura
- Overlord: The Sacred Kingdom (2024), Ainz Ooal Gown

=== Tokusatsu ===
2016

- Doubutsu Sentai Zyuohger, Mantor (ep. 16)

2018

- Kaitou Sentai Lupinranger VS Keisatsu Sentai Patranger, Jenko Copamino (ep. 12)
- Hero Mama League, Space Ninja Demost
- Uchu Sentai Kyuranger vs. Space Squad, Space Ninja Demost

2019

- Ultraman Taiga - Ultraman Titas (eps. 1, 3 - 26)

2022

- Kamen Rider OOO 10th: Core Medal of Resurrection, Goda

=== Video games ===
- Naruto (series), Sai
- League of Legends, Ezreal
- Little Anchor, Fennel York
- Several Shades of Sadism (SSS), Chiaki Kira
- Higurashi: When They Cry (2008), Akira Todou
- Yu-Gi-Oh! ZEXAL World Duel Carnival (2013), Vector
- DRAMAtical Murder (2012), Noiz
- DRAMAtical Murder Re:connect (2013), Noiz
- DRAMAtical Murder re:code (2014), Noiz
- Granblue Fantasy (2014), Orologia
- Samurai Warriors 4 (2014), Yoshitsugi Otani
- Tales of Zestiria (2014), Michael
- Yakuza Kiwami (2016), Takashi
- Samurai Warriors: Spirit of Sanada (2016), Yoshitsugi Otani
- Yakuza Kiwami 2 (2017), Takashi
- Fate/Grand Order (2018), Napoleon Bonaparte
- A3! Act! Addict! Actors! (2018), Guy
- Food Fantasy (2018) – Peking Duck, Sanma, Steak
- Warriors Orochi 4 (2018), Yoshitsugi Otani
- Dragalia Lost (2018), Wake
- Promise of wizard (2019), Bradley
- Persona 5 The Royal (2019), Takuto Maruki
- Honkai Impact 3rd (2019), Kevin Kaslana
- Arknights (2020), Hung
- Bleach: Brave Souls (2020), Lille Barro
- HELIOS Rising Heroes (2020), Gast Adler
- Bravely Default 2 (2021), Prince Castor
- Tokyo Afterschool Summoners (2021), Tindalos
- Alchemy Stars (2021), Seleucid and Chainsaw Rick
- Witch on the Holy Night (2022), Kazuki Yamashiro
- Wo Long: Fallen Dynasty (2023), Zhao Yun
- Honkai: Star Rail (2024), Hakuhatsu Ki, Phainon
- Yu-Gi-Oh! Duel Links (2025) Rei Shingetsu/Vector
- Trails in the Sky 1st Chapter (2025), Lorence Belgar
- Romancing SaGa 3: Destinies United (2027), Mikhail Ausbach von Loanne

=== Dubbing ===
==== Live-action ====
- Ju Ji-hoon
  - Princess Hours, Crown Prince Lee Shin
  - Five Fingers, Yoo Ji-ho
  - Along with the Gods: The Two Worlds, Haewonmak
  - Along with the Gods: The Last 49 Days,
  - Dark Figure of Crime, Kang Tae-oh
- 65, Mills (Adam Driver)
- The Adventurers, Po Chen (Tony Yang)
- Arrow, Oliver Queen / Arrow (Stephen Amell)
- Awake, Sheriff Roger Bower (William Forsythe)
- Breaking and Entering, Mirsad "Miro" Simić (Rafi Gavron)
- Burying the Ex, Max (Anton Yelchin)
- Captain Marvel, Att-Lass (Algenis Perez Soto)
- Christine (2019 Blu-Ray edition), Dennis Guilder (John Stockwell)
- Crash Landing on You, Ri Jeong-hyeok (Hyun Bin)
- Crisis on Earth-X, Oliver Queen / Arrow (Stephen Amell)
- The Day After Tomorrow, Brian Parks (Arjay Smith)
- A Discovery of Witches, Matthew Clairmont (Matthew Goode)
- Eragon, Roran (Christopher Egan)
- Good People, Tom Wright (James Franco)
- Good Sam, Dr. Caleb Tucker (Michael Stahl-David)
- Harry Potter and the Goblet of Fire, Cedric Diggory (Robert Pattinson)
- Helix, Dr. Kyle Sommer (Matt Long)
- Jappeloup (2021 BS TV Tokyo edition), Pierre Durand Jr. (Guillaume Canet)
- Jurassic World Dominion, Ramsay Cole (Mamoudou Athie)
- Just like Heaven, Darryl (Jon Heder)
- The Legend of 1900 (2020 Blu-Ray edition), 1900 (Tim Roth)
- Megalopolis (Clodio Pulcher (Shia LaBeouf))
- Napoleon Dynamite, Pedro Sánchez (Efren Ramirez)
- NCIS: Origins, Leroy Jethro Gibbs (Austin Stowell)
- Pawn Shop Chronicles, Raw Dog (Paul Walker)
- The Penguin, Alberto Falcone (Michael Zegen)
- Resident Evil: Welcome to Raccoon City, Albert Wesker (Tom Hopper)
- RRR, Alluri Sitarama Raju (Ram Charan)
- A Royal Night Out, Jack Hodges (Jack Reynor)
- Simple Simon, Simon (Bill Skarsgård)
- Snow White, Sneezy (Jason Kravits)
- Stranger Things, Henry Creel / Vecna (Jamie Campbell Bower)
- The Suicide Squad, Javelin (Flula Borg)
- Superbad, Evan (Michael Cera)
- Tom & Jerry, Ben (Colin Jost)
- Valerian and the City of a Thousand Planets, Major Valerian (Dane DeHaan)

==== Animation ====
- Kim Possible, Ron Stoppable
