= Saki Nakajima =

Saki Nakajima may refer to:

- Saki Nakajima (voice actress) (born 1978), Japanese voice actress
- Saki Nakajima (singer) (born 1994), J-pop singer in the Hello! Project group °C-ute
