= Saki Nakajima (voice actress) =

Japanese voice actress (born 1978)

- 中島 沙樹
- Born: September 1, 1978 (age 48); Saitama, Japan
- Occupation: Voice actress
- Years active: 1996-present
- Agent: Tokyo Actor's Consumer's Cooperative Society
- Spouse: Satoshi Hino (m. 2014)
- Children: 2

Saki Nakajima (中島 沙樹, Nakajima Saki; born September 1, 1978) is a Japanese voice actress affiliated with Tokyo Actor's Consumer's Cooperative Society. Her major roles include Ichigo Momomiya, the main character of magical girl series Tokyo Mew Mew, Chizuru Honshou in Bleach and Mimi Tasogare in Duel Masters.

== Personal life ==
Her voice type is mezzo-soprano. She has a First-class Kindergarten Teacher License and her special skill is playing the flute. On September 3, 2020, she announced on Twitter the birth of her second child with Hino.

== Filmography ==
=== Television animation ===
- Bleach as Chizuru Honshou
- Blue Dragon as Bouquet
- Circlet Princess as Miyuki Kasahara
- Daitoshokan no Hitsujikai as Maho Mochizuki
- Duel Masters as Mimi Tasogare
- Princess Tsubame as Tsubame Akizuki; ED theme song performance
- Gravion Zwei as Dika
- Hayate the Combat Butler as Saki Kijima, Taiga Ookouchi
- Märchen Awakens Romance as Dorothy
- Muteki Kanban Musume as Wakana Endou
- Ragnarok The Animation as Alice
- Shodan, Secret of Heaven Wars as Kana Murata
- Star Twinkle PreCure as Yumika Nasu
- Strawberry Panic! as Chikaru Minamoto
- To Heart 2 as Karin Sasamori
- Tokyo Mew Mew as Ichigo Momomiya; ED theme song performance
- Tokyo Mew Mew New as Sakura Momomiya (Ichigo's mother)
- Zettai Karen Children as Keiko Kojika

=== Video games ===
- Hayate the Combat Butler as Saki Kijima
- Kajiri Kamui Kagura: Akebono no Hikari as Rindou Suzuka Kouga, Lady-in-Waiting
- Märchen Awakens Romance as Dorothy
- Rockman Zero 4 as Sol Titanion
- Rockman ZX as Sol Titanion
- Star Ocean: Second Evolution as Celine Jules
- Star Ocean: The Second Story R as Celine Jules
- Strawberry Panic as Chikaru Minamoto
- Suikoden V as Faylen, Lelei
- To Heart 2 as Karin Sasamori
- Tokyo Mew Mew as Ichigo Momomiya
- Trapt as Allura
- Eiyuu Senki as Alexander the Great, William Kidd

=== Japanese-Other ===
- Ganko the Sea Castle as Oto
- Sora no Iro, Mizu no Iro OVA 2 as Asa Mizushima
