= List of Tokyo Mew Mew New episodes =

Tokyo Mew Mew New
- The Mew Mews
- No. of episodes: 24

Release
- Original network: TV Tokyo
- Original release: July 6, 2022 – June 21, 2023

The episodes of the Tokyo Mew Mew New anime series are based on the manga series of the same name written by Reiko Yoshida and illustrated by Mia Ikumi. The episodes focus on five girls infused with the DNA of rare animals that gives them special powers and allows them to transform into "Mew Mews". Led by Ichigo Momomiya, the girls protect Earth from aliens who wish to "reclaim" it. It is a reboot/remake of the original series.

A new anime adaptation was announced to commemorate the manga's 20th anniversary. It was later revealed that the adaptation would be animated by Yumeta Company and Graphinica, and directed by Takahiro Natori, with Yuka Yamada handling the series' scripts, Satoshi Ishino designing the characters, and Yasuharu Takanashi composing the music. New cast members were chosen to play the Mew Mews through a public audition held in Q2 2020, and they would also be promoting the anime as an idol group named Smewthie as their characters. The group also sings the opening and ending themes for the series. The opening theme is "Cat! We Are Super Girls" (Cat!!してSuperGirls, Catto!! Shite SuperGirls) and the ending theme is "Heartbeat Once-in-a-Lifetime" (トキメキ☆イチゴいちえ, Tokimeki Ichigo Ichie). A special ending theme for episode 12, "My Sweet Heart" (New ver.) (my sweet heart~にゅ~♡Ver.~, my sweet heart~Nyū~♡Ver.~), was sung by Yūki Tenma, as Ichigo Momomiya.

The first season aired from July 6 to September 21, 2022, on TV Tokyo. A second season was announced at the end of the twelfth episode, which aired from April 5 to June 21, 2023. The opening theme for the second season is "Megamorphose" (めがもるふぉ～ぜ♡, Megamorufōze) and the ending theme is "Can-do Dreamer".

Sentai Filmworks has licensed the series outside of Asia and streams it on Hidive.

== Episode list ==
=== Season 1 (2022) ===
No. overall	No. in season	Title (Note: English titles are taken from HIDIVE.)	Directed by	Written by	Original release date
1	1	"Wait, What?! I'm a Superhero Now?! Meow!"; Transliteration: "Dōnatteruno!? Kyō kara Seigi no Mikata da Nyan!" (Japanese: どーなってるの！？今日から正義の味方だにゃん！)	Natsumi Higashida	Yuka Yamada	July 6, 2022
Ichigo Momomiya is a first-year high school student who longs for love. She meets Masaya Aoyama, the most popular boy at school, and goes on a date with him. However, on the day of the date, she is hit by a mysterious beam of light. She is fused with the genes of an Iriomote cat, an endangered species, and becomes Mew Ichigo, a heroine of justice who protects the Earth. Ichigo has her first fight with a Chimera Anima made from a rat.
2	2	"What Makes a Real Friend?"; Transliteration: "Hontō no Tomodachi tte Nan Desu ka?" (Japanese: 本当の友達ってなんですか？)	Takaaki Ishiyama	Yuka Yamada	July 13, 2022
Ichigo is asked by Ryô Shirogane and Keiichirô Akasaka to join the Mew Project to protect the earth from aliens. She starts working part-time at Café Mew Mew, their hideout, while searching for the rest of the yet-to-be-discovered Mew Mews with Mint Aizawa. One day at the café, Ichigo meets a kind girl named Lettuce Midorikawa and wants to become friends with her. However, Lettuce seems to be troubled by something. Ichigo and Mint hear a rumor about a strange phenomenon, which they believe to be the work of Chimera Animas.
3	3	"A Stolen Kiss?! Mew Pudding is Here!"; Transliteration: "Ubawareta Kuchibiru!? Myū Purin Sanjō!" (Japanese: 奪われた唇！？ミュウプリン参上！)	Yasutaka Yamamoto	Kunihiko Okada	July 20, 2022
Ichigo goes to the zoo with Masaya where they both run into a cheerful girl, Bu-Ling Huang, who enacts street performances like a monkey. While being disappointed that her date was interrupted, an alien who calls himself Kish appears before Ichigo's eyes. It was their new friend, Mew Pudding, who saved Mew Strawberry and her friends from a crisis involving Chimera Animas made from an elephant, a giraffe, a lion, and a rhinoceros.
4	4	"Who Doesn't Want to Be Her? Our Last Member is a Huge Star!"; Transliteration: "Akogare no Onēsama Saigo no Hitori wa Dai Sutā" (Japanese: 憧れのお姉さま 最後の一人は大スター)	Tatsuya Ishiguro	Ayumi Kuo	July 27, 2022
The Mew Mews find their final member, Zakuro Fujiwara, a popular celebrity. In order to get in touch with her, Ichigo, Mint, and Lettuce decide to attend an audition for a musical while also having to contend with Kish and his Chimera Animas he made from some crows.
5	5	"Smile, Mint! A Fancy Lady, Forlorn"; Transliteration: "Waratte Minto! Ojō-sama no Yūutsu" (Japanese: 笑ってみんと！お嬢様の憂鬱)	Kōjin Ochi	Yuka Yamada	August 3, 2022
After Mint became depressed by Zakuro not joining the Mew Mews, Ichigo and her friends came to Mint's mansion to cheer her up. Mint regains her energy after talking with the others about her dream and decides to go see Zakuro again. Kish then shows up and turns Mint's dog Mickey into a Chimera Animas which Mint and the Mew Mews must save.
6	6	"Hear My Voice! I will Surpass Myself"; Transliteration: "Kokoro ni Hibike! Watashi wa Watashi o Koete Iku" (Japanese: 心に響け！私は私を超えていく)	Natsumi Higashida	Nobuo Kabyakuyū	August 10, 2022
Ichigo, Mint, Lettuce, and Bu-Ling go to the TV station to protect Zakuro after hearing Kish's plan to attack her. In order to do this, they disguise themselves and succeed in infiltrating the station. They meet Zakuro again and persuade her to join the Mew Mews when Kish unleashes a slimy snake-like Chimera Animas.
7	7	"A Farewell in a Flurry of Petals"; Transliteration: "Owakare no Sakura Fubuki" (Japanese: お別れの桜吹雪)	Misuzu Hoshino	Kunihiko Okada	August 17, 2022
Instead of Kish, who has been making a string of mistakes, the cool-headed Pie and the mischievous Tart attack Ichigo, who was with Masaya. As the unseasonal cherry blossoms are in full bloom, Ichigo and Masaya are attacked by the Chimera Animas made from a swarm of hornets. Ichigo wants to transform into a Mew Mew to protect Masaya, but is worried that her true identity will be revealed.
8	8	"Believe in Yourself! Romance on the High Seas!"; Transliteration: "Jishin o Motte Kurūjingu wa Hatsukoi Fūmi" (Japanese: 自信を持って クルージングは初恋風味)	Takaaki Ishiyama	Ayumi Kuo	August 24, 2022
The Mew Mews attend a luxury party held on a cruise ship. Lettuce wants to make herself useful by protecting everyone from the attacking Chimera Animas made from different sea creatures. Then, she must overcome her inability to swim as one of Bu-Ling's siblings is drowning.
9	9	"Let Cupid's Arrow Fly! The Super Secret Date Scheme!"; Transliteration: "Koi no Kyūpiddo! Dēto Maru Hi Daisakusen!" (Japanese: 恋のキューピッド！デートマル秘大作戦！)	Natsumi Higashida	Yuka Yamada	August 31, 2022
Masaya has obtained two tickets to a live concert which he wants to invite Ichigo to. But with a part-time job, school, and being a Mew Mew, Ichigo is so busy that she doesn't get to see Masaya as much. That is, until he shows up at Cafe Mew Mew. When they realize that Masaya wants to give Ichigo a concert ticket, the Mew Mews try their best to help the two. Though Kish plans to ruin these plans with help from some Chimera Animas made from lizards.
10	10	"Cat Got My Tongue?! A Heart-Pounding Transformation!"; Transliteration: "Nyan te Kotta! Dokidoki ga Tomaranai?" (Japanese: にゃんてこった！ドキドキが止まらない？)	Tadao Ōkubo	Ayumi Kuo	September 7, 2022
Following a fight with a Chimera Animas made from a bat, Ichigo is looking forward to a date with Masaya. But there is one thing that is worrying her: she is becoming more and more like a cat.
11	11	"Everyone is Waiting for You! Run, Ichigo!"; Transliteration: "Minna ga Matteru! Hashire Ichigo!" (Japanese: みんなが待ってる！走れいちご！)	Shunji Yoshida	Kunihiko Okada	September 14, 2022
The aliens commence their "Tokyo Gondwana Renaissance" operation. Shirogane and his team detect Mew Aqua, a super substance that can purify the world, and without knowing where Ichigo is, they are forced to dispatch Mint, Lettuce, Bu-Ling, and Zakuro to Tokyo Tower. Meanwhile, Ichigo, who is still a cat, runs away from Masaya's house and wanders around town by herself. Mint contends with Kish and some Chimera Animas made from mantises.
12	12	"Rain and Tears"; Transliteration: "Ame to Namida" (Japanese: 雨と涙)	Natsumi Higashida	Kunihiko Okada	September 21, 2022
Ichigo rushes to the scene, and the Mew Mew quintet face Kish at their strongest and his fellow aliens in a great battle. However, the pollutants released by the Dust Wyvern, a creature born from a giant cocoon, cover the sky above and all of Tokyo is in a mass panic. Meanwhile, Masaya is waiting for Ichigo at the concert for another of their dates.

=== Season 2 (2023) ===
No. overall	No. in season	Title	Directed by	Written by	Original release date
13	1	"Step Up! Ichigo's Romance Enters the Next Stage!"; Transliteration: "Suteppu Appu! Ichigo Koi no Sekando Sutēji!" (Japanese: Step up！いちご恋のセカンドステージ！)	Daisuke Nishimura	Yuka Yamada	April 5, 2023
Ichigo decides to spend the weekend with Masaya helping out at the aquarium for a children's event. On the day of the event, Ichigo is enjoying her date night while volunteering, but then Kish shows up and wants a date of his own with her as he transforms the sea creatures in the aquarium into Chimera Animas.
14	2	"Mint, the Runaway?! I'm Going to Change the World!"; Transliteration: "Minto ga Iede!? Watakushi ga Sekai o Kaemasuwa!" (Japanese: みんとが家出！？わたくしが世界を変えますわ！)	Takaaki Ishiyama	Kunihiko Okada	April 12, 2023
Blue Knight, a mysterious handsome man, appears when Ichigo is in a pinch. As Ichigo is pondering who he is, Mint suddenly comes to visit her house. Mint is running away from home because she is angry that her family treats her like a child. Mint tries hard to come up with a wind power business plan to show her family that she's no longer a child. Things get worse when Pie attacks with a swarm of Chimera Animas made from dragonflies.
15	3	"Hi Mom, It's Purin! I'm Doing Great!"; Transliteration: "Zenryaku Hahaue Purin wa Genki de Yatteiru noda" (Japanese: 前略母上 歩鈴は元気でやっているのだ)	Oyunamu	Kunihiko Okada	April 19, 2023
Purin is going to see a circus at the TOKIO Dome with her younger siblings who are celebrating their birthdays. At the same time however, the aliens are about to launch the second plate of Operation "Tokyo Gondwana Renaissance". The target of this operation is the TOKIO Dome as they use their Xenodiggers to help out.
16	4	"Droplets of Love! Lettuce and The Little Mermaid"; Transliteration: "Koi no Shizuku Retasu to Ningyohime" (Japanese: 恋のしずく れたすと人魚姫)	Natsumi Higashida	Yuka Yamada	April 26, 2023
Word comes in that there is something that looks like Mew Aqua at the Maritime Museum and Shirogane and Lettuce decide to go there to find out if it is true or not. They investigate the ancient earrings, but Quiche comes to attack them. Lettuce falls into the sea and wakes up in a strange land.
17	5	"Music Video Madness: When Two Prodigies Clash!"; Transliteration: "Futari no Tensai Hibanachiru Emubui Satsuei!" (Japanese: 二人の天才 火花散るMV撮影！)	Masafumi Satō	Kunihiko Okada	May 3, 2023
Zakuro is self-producing a music video, and invites Ichigo and the others to star in it. The music video is directed by Rika Minagawa, a classmate of Zakuro's who is a genius filmmaker. When filming begins, Zakuro responds perfectly to every order, but Rika is not satisfied as she wants to capture the "real" Zakuro. Kish crashes the event with some Chimera Animas made from rabbits.
18	6	"His Hidden Resolve: The Birth of the Mew Project"; Transliteration: "Himeta Kakugo Myū Purojekuto ga Umareta Hi" (Japanese: 秘めた覚悟 μプロジェクトが生まれた日)	Shigeki Awai	Ayumi Kuo	May 10, 2023
Akasaka tells Ichigo about Shirogane's past and the start of the Mew Project which started the day when two Chimera Animas attacked Shirogane's home and led to the death of Shirogane's parents. Meanwhile, Mint visits Tokyo Bay to see Seiji's company's new product as Pie unleashes the Xenojelly.
19	7	"My Future Starts Now: This Is the Real Me"; Transliteration: "Ugokidasu Mirai Kore ga Hontō no Atashi" (Japanese: 動き出す未来 これが本当のあたし)	Natsumi Higashida	Yuka Yamada	May 17, 2023
Aoyama and Ichigo have their first date in a while. However, a big challenge is about to come to Ichigo when Kish attacks them with a Chimera Anima made from a chicken.
20	8	"Kish and the Blue Knight"; Transliteration: "Kisshu to Ao no Kishi" (Japanese: キッシュと蒼の騎士)	Daisuke Nishimura	Ayumi Kuo	May 24, 2023 (Note: This episode aired at 1:00 a.m. JST, 1 hour after the original air time on TV Tokyo.)
Aoyama is worried about Ichigo and does not want her to fight anymore. The aliens launch a sudden attack with Tart leading some Chimera Animas and Kish kidnaps Ichigo. As Kish is pouring out his feelings for Ichigo, the Blue Knight comes to the rescue.
21	9	"Deep Blue"; Transliteration: "Fukaki Ao" (Japanese: 深き蒼)	Unknown	Unknown	May 31, 2023
22	10	"Scattered Hearts & A Tearful Night"; Transliteration: "Barabara no Kokoro Namida no Yoru" (Japanese: バラバラの心 涙の夜)	Unknown	Unknown	June 7, 2023
23	11	"Hear Our Cry! The Final Battle!!"; Transliteration: "Omoiyo Todoke! Saigo no Tatakai!!" (Japanese: 想いよとどけ！ 最後の戦い！！)	Unknown	Unknown	June 14, 2023
24	12	"The Future We Build Together"; Transliteration: "Watashitachi ga Tsukuru Mirai" (Japanese: 私たちがつくる未来)	Unknown	Unknown	June 21, 2023

== See also ==
- List of Tokyo Mew Mew chapters
- List of Tokyo Mew Mew characters
- List of Tokyo Mew Mew episodes
