= Mia Ikumi =

Japanese manga artist (1979–2022)

Mia Ikumi 征海美亜
- Born: March 27, 1979
- Died: March 7, 2022 (aged 42)
- Area: Manga artist
- Notable works: Tokyo Mew Mew, Super Doll Licca-chan (manga)

Mia Ikumi (Japanese: 征海美亜, Hepburn: Ikumi Mia; March 27, 1979 – March 7, 2022) was a Japanese manga artist best known for being the creator, illustrator, and storyboarder of Tokyo Mew Mew, a manga series Ikumi created with writer Reiko Yoshida. Her first manga story, The Rabbit Who Makes It Rain Stars was written when she was just 18 years old, and was a winning entry in the Nakayoshi Newcomer manga contest.

Ikumi died of a subarachnoid hemorrhage on March 7, 2022.

== Works ==
Title	Year	Notes	Refs
The Rabbit Who Makes It Rain Stars	1997	Debut work Also known as Usagi no Furasu Hoshi, Rabbit Starfall; Winner of the 24th Nakayoshi Newcomer Manga Award; Published in RunRun, January 1998; Reprinted in Tokyo Mew Mew à La Mode, volume 2	
The Sleeping Beauty of Berry Forest	1997	Also known as Sleeping Princess of Berry Forest; Published in Nakayoshi August 1998 Summer Break Land Special Edition; Reprinted in Tokyo Mew Mew, volume 6	
Tokyo Black Cat Girl	1999	Published in Nakayoshi February 2000 Winter Break Land Special Edition; Reprinted in Tokyo Mew Mew, volume 4	
Super Doll Licca-chan	1999	Serialized in Nakayoshi; Published by Kodansha Comics for 2 volumes	
Tokyo Mew Mew	2000–03	Illustrator and co-creator, written with Reiko Yoshida. Serialized in Nakayoshi magazine Published by Kodansha for 7 volumes	
Tokyo Mew Mew à la Mode	2003-04	Sequel to Tokyo Mew Mew	
Girls Fight	2004	Published in Nakayoshi March 2004	
Repure	2004	Published in Asuka Comics for 1 volume	
Koi Cupid	2005–08	Serialized in Comi Digi and Comi Digi+ Published in Flex Comix for 5 volumes	
Only One Wish	2005	Serialized in Nakayoshi magazine Published by Kodansha for one volume	
Tokyo Mew Mew Re-Turn	2020	Serialized in Nakayoshi magazine	
