= List of In Another World with My Smartphone characters =

The following is a list of characters and locations from the Japanese fantasy series In Another World with My Smartphone which originated as a web novel in 2013 and has been since adapted into a series of light novels, manga, and two seasons of anime.

== Characters and locations ==
=== Duchy of Brunhild ===
A sovereign city located between the Kingdom of Belfast and Regulus Empire, governed by Touya Mochizuki. The city's development is being managed by Kousaka Masanobu of the Elite Four, who is also the counselor of the city.

Touya Mochizuki (望月冬夜, Mochizuki Tōya)
Voiced by: Katsumi Fukuhara (Japanese); Jessie James Grelle (season 1), Bryson Baugus (season 2) (English)
A fifteen-year-old from Earth and the series' main protagonist, reborn by God into another world as a way of apology for the latter's mistake of killing him. His smartphone is his only remaining connection to Earth; while he can no longer call anyone from his old life, he can still access the Internet, and the battery can be recharged with magical energy. He is bestowed with all seven attributes of magic: Fire, Water, Wind, Earth, Light, Dark, and Null, making him so powerful that it is nearly impossible for his enemies to take him down. Touya forms good friendships with Ende, Lyon, Lux, Cloud, and Reinhard. He has nine wives and nine children. He spends most of his time learning new kinds of spells, helping out people with business and political improvements, and recreating modern Earth's culture like food, culinary goods, entertainment, games, technology, infrastructure, attractions, luxury items, weapons, combat gear, and even Earth holidays. When Touya starts his new life, he worked as an adventurer then eventually in the series after foiling most of the villains' schemes and being engaged to four princesses, a duchess, a fairy court magician, and three female companions, he has become the founder and ruler of Duchy of Brunhild.
Elze Silhoueska (エルゼ・シルエスカ, Eruze Shiruesuka)
Voiced by: Maaya Uchida (Japanese); Leah Clark (English)
The elder sister of the Silhoueska twins, a pair of wandering adventurers, and with her natural impulsiveness as a fighter by profession. She has long hair and feels less feminine than Linze. Touya meets her and Linze early in his journey, rescuing them from rogues in an alleyway, and thereafter, they register as adventurers in his party with the local guild. Elze fights with a pair of enchanted gauntlets and can only use the Null magic 'Boost', which increases her physical abilities, She also forms close friendship with Yae and Hildegard. She is Touya's third fiancée and seventh wife and Elna's mother.
Linze Silhoueska (リンゼ・シルエスカ, Rinze Shiruesuka)
Voiced by: Yui Fukuo (Japanese); Jill Harris (English)
The younger sister of the Silhoueska twins. With her intelligence and natural talent, she is the magic specialist of the two sisters. She has short hair and can use three magic attributes: Fire, Water, and Light. Touya meets her and Elze early in his journey, rescuing them from rogues in an alleyway, and thereafter, they register as adventurers in his party with the local guild and helps him how to read and write in her world as well use most of the magic she knows. She has a strong passion for romantic novels, especially Yaoi stories and fills Touya's Moon Reader Cafe with whichever series she knows on his list. She even forms good terms with Yumina, Lucia and Princess Reliel Rehm Refreese, who too is a Yaoi fangirl and secretly a novelist of gay romances; even Prim and her fellow female guild receptionists & the elven guildmaster Relisha are also fans of the same genre alongside her. She is Touya's second fiancée and eighth wife and Linne's mother.
Yae Kokonoe (九重八重, Kokonoe Yae)
Voiced by: Chinatsu Akasaki (Japanese); Michelle Rojas (English)
Born in the far eastern country of Eashen to a samurai family, Yae left her home to travel and hone her skills elsewhere. Touya's group crosses paths with her during their travels, helping to fend off a group of ruffians attacking her. Thereafter, she decides to accompany Touya on his travels and became a adventurer herself. However, Yae is practically a human garbage disposal; regularly putting a strain on the group's funds to compensate for her high metabolism. After beatin' by her family's close friend Viscount Swordrick and watching a video recording his secret shadesword technique on Touya's smartphone, she gained everyone's support for getting stronger and improving her fighting skills with their help. Eventually, she returns to Eashen alongside the group to save her father, brother, and hometown from a provincial war within the country. Yae also made close friendship with Elze and especially Hildegard for their equal skills of swordsmanship. She is Touya's fourth fiancée and ninth wife and Yakumo's mother.
Sushie Ernea Ortlinde (スゥシィ・エルネア・オルトリンデ, Sūshī Erunea Orutorinde)
Voiced by: Nanami Yamashita (Japanese); Sarah Wiedenheft (English)
The daughter of Duke Alfred and Duchess Ellen Ernes Ortlinde, older sister of Edward, the niece of King Tristwin and Queen Yuel, and Yumina and Yamato's cousin (although she calls Yumina her big sister instead of cousin). Sushie prefers for her friends and family to call her Sue (スゥ, Sū). She meets Touya's group early in the story when they rescue her from an attempted kidnapping (later revealed to have been arranged by Count Balsa) and also saved her family butler Leim from dying of an arrow shot, leading to her forming a crush on Touya, though he sees her as a little sister. Due to her innocent naivety, Sue causes embarrassing moments. She is also good friends with Renne and Arma. She gets special training of self-defense from Lapis and Cecile and Light healing magic teachings from Leen. Later, to protect Sue from a political betrothal to a foreign fake prince suspected of pedophilia, she becomes Touya's sixth fiancée and fourth wife. She is also Stephania's mother.
Yumina Ernea Belfast (ユミナ・エルネア・ベルファスト, Yumina Erunea Berufasuto)
Voiced by: Marika Kōno (Japanese); Felecia Angelle (season 1), Celeste Perez (season 2) (English)
The princess of Belfast, the daughter of King Tristwin and Queen Yuel, older sister of Prince Yamato, the niece of Duchess Ellen and Duke Alfred Ernes Ortlinde, and Sue and Edward's cousin (although she treats Sue more like a little sister rather than a cousin). Yumina met Touya when he heals her father from attempted poisoning, and quickly started to fall in love with him. Yumina possesses the Null magic "Mystic Eyes" of intuition, an ability that comes from her heterochromic eyes, which gives her the ability to see a person's true nature, Later on in the series, Yumina gains a dependent rait called foresight, which is the ability to see the future. She also possess Dark, Earth and Wind magic and uses them when she joins Touya's adventure party. Yumina forms close friendships with Lucia and Linze, and even Reliel for supporting her gay romantic materials that she writes in secret. She is Touya's first fiancée and wife and Kuon's mother.
Leen (リーン, Rīn)
Voiced by: Sumire Uesaka (Japanese); Monica Rial (English)
As head of the Fairy Tribe of Mismede, Leen serves as the court mage of the Kingdom of Mismede and is capable of using her personal null magic, 'Program'. Over the span of 200 years, she has used 'Program' to create an automated teddy bear named Paula who can interact with humans and other beings, though it has yet to gain the capability to speak. Because she had not used her wings for a long period of time, she is unable to fly. She meets Touya during a diplomatic trip from Belfast when Paula brings him to her personal chambers. Intrigued by his abilities, she asks him to become her disciple; when Touya declines, she becomes Mismede's ambassador to Belfast and Brunhild Dukedom as an excuse to spend more time around him and getting information from her apprentice Charlotte as well punishing her for telling Touya about her master's vile sadistic past teachings. She gets along well with Sakura and teaches her, Sue and Renne how to mastered their magic. She is Touya's eighth fiancée & fifth wife and Quun's mother.
Lucia Leah Regulus (ルーシア・レア・レグルス, Rūshia Rea Regurusu)
Voiced by: Miyu Takagi (Japanese); Jalitza Delgado (English)
The third princess of the Regulus Empire. Touya meets Lucia when he saved the empire from being overthrown by the imperial army in a coup, and she began to fall in love with him. He agrees to marry her after the Emperor of Regulus creates a truce with the King of Belfast, then she moves into the Brunhild Dukedom with Touya and everyone else. Lucia is a competitive person who hates losing. Her main weapons are twin swords. She is also diligent at cooking, has a sensitive taste bud, and is on good terms with Yumina. Like Sushie, she also prefers to be called by her nickname Lu (ルー, Rū). She is Touya's fifth fiancée and second wife and Arcia's mother.
Hildegard Minas Lestia (ヒルデガルド・ミナス・レスティア, Hirudegarudo Minasu Resutia)
Voiced by: Yu Serizawa (Japanese); Molly Searcy (English)
Hildegard is the first princess of Lestia Knight Kingdom. She is a rather chivalrous noble person and usually wears magic-enchanted armor. She is on good terms with Yae, as the two are quite equally skilled in swordsmanship, and is known as "Knight Princess". Hildegard fell in love with Touya after the battle with the Phrase. Then, she moves into the Brunhild Dukedom with Touya and appoints herself as his personal knight after officially joining the bride conference. Like Sushie and Lucia, she too prefers her nickname Hilda (ヒルデ, Hiruda). She is Touya's seventh fiancée and third wife and Freigard's mother.
Sakura (桜, Sakura)
Voiced by: Miyu Kubota (Japanese); Reshel Mae (English)
She is actually a potential successor of Xenoahs Demon Kingdom. However, due to her being a half-human and half demonkin, she is considered an outcast to others except Spica Frennel, who is her loyal personal bodyguard and Leen, whom she formed good terms with while living in Xenoahs and Brunhild regardless of her highest magic quality to take the throne once her horns grows at age ten, even though she has no intention of succeed her goofy and overdoting father, especially after what he did to her life as well her mother's. One day, she survived an assassination attempt from Yulong's assassins arranged by her step-uncle Severus Arnos and escaped with her Null magic: Teleport, after faking her death, leading the people of her kingdom to believe she was killed. After being rescued by Touya and regenerating her lost limbs, she suffered amnesia and was nicknamed 'Sakura' by Touya for her pink hair. Her real name is Farnese Forneus, although she chooses to continue using her nickname. Prior to the series, she was bestowed with Phantom of Eyes on her enchanted medallion which altered her face and changed her hair color, with sharp hearing ability. Currently, she stays with Touya at Brunhild Dukedom even after regaining her memories. Sakura has a beautiful singing voice which captures everyone's hearts as she sings to the piano music that Touya was playing in the castle and during the festivities. As well Null magic of Teleportion, She also possess Dark and Water magic in which Leen and Linze are teaching her how to control them. She becomes Touya's ninth fiancée and sixth wife and is also Yoshino's mother.
Renne (レネ, Rene)
Voiced by: Yoshino Aoyama (Japanese); Alison Viktorin (Season 1), Madeleine Morris (Season 2) (English)
A young orphan girl who pickpockets people to survive poverty. Her mother died shortly after she was born, later in the following years, her father never returned from a quest to slay a magical beast, presumably having been killed. She was taught how to pickpocket by a kind travelling old lady in order to survive through hard times. Touya encounters her when she stole his wallet, he followed her with his smartphone (this does not happen in the anime). After saving her from territorial thugs, he took her in and had her work as a personal maid in his mansion and castle. Despite her difficult early childhood, she has shown to be a highly dependable, polite, and professional young woman with resourcefulness and fast learning skills. She can ride a bicycle that Touya made for her pretty well. In the following series, she learn the truth from Touya and Carol that her late mother is a runaway noblewoman from Regulus Empire and her necklace is magical tool with a wind stone that only triggers if the wearer is from the Rilettes bloodline. Renne was happy to stay with Touya and everyone who cares for her like family as well gladly taking holidays with her grandmother Mary and aunt Carol in Regulus and Brunhild. She also has feelings for Touya, but has yet to marry him or become his mistress (whichever she chooses to be) while training to be a head maid. She is also good friends with Sue and Arma. Renne takes special training of self-defense with dagger technique from Cecile and Lapis, and wind magic teachings from Leen.
Arcia Mochizuki (望月アーシア, Mochizuki Āshia)
Touya's fifth child and Lucia's daughter. Like her mother, she is a skilled cook.
Elna Mochizuki (望月エルナ, Mochizuki Eruna)
Touya's sixth child and Elze's daughter. Unlike her mother, she doesn't like fighting.
Freigard Mochizuki (望月フレイガルド, Mochizuki Fureigarudo)
Touya's second child and the daughter of Hildegard. Just like her mother, she prefers her nickname Frei (フライ, Furai). She is also a skilled fighter and is considered to be the scariest out of Touya's children when she's angry.
Kuon Mochizuki (望月久遠, Mochizuki Kuon)
Touya's eighth child and the son of Yumina. He is Touya's only son. Kuon was named after his great-grandfather on his father's side. He is infatuated by Allistella, his fellow visitor from the future. Later in the series, Kuon and Allistella are engaged.
Linne Mochizuki (望月リンネ, Mochizuki Rinne)
Touya's seventh child and Linze's daughter. She formed good terms with Allistella.
Quun Mochizuki (望月クーン, Mochizuki Kūn)
Touya's third child and the daughter of Leen. Like her mother, Quun has a thirst for knowledge. Though unlike Leen's obsession with Ancient Magic, Quun is obsessed with Golems, having created one that looks similar to Paula, named Parla. She is a naughty child among all of her siblings and likes teasing her family if that's required. Quun is heavily aware of how she will live several centuries and will outlive her siblings, seemingly not aware of her divine lineage; so she takes as many pictures with her own smartphone as she can of her family, so she can have them as solace when she misses them in later life.
Stephania Mochizuki (望月ステファニア, Mochizuki Sutefania)
Touya's ninth child and Sushie's daughter. She was named after Renne's mother Stephanie in honor of their friendship. Just like her mother, she prefers her nickname Steph. She is also Renne's goddaughter. Like her elder half-sister Quun, she is very troublesome.
Yakumo Mochizuki (望月八雲, Mochizuki Yakumo)
Touya's first child and the daughter of Yae. She won't marry anyone unless they can beat her in a fight. Yakumo also takes infiltration training from Tsubaki.
Yoshino Mochizuki (望月ヨシノ, Mochizuki Yoshino)
Touya's fourth child and the daughter of Sakura. Compared to her mother, who likes singing, she likes playing musical instruments.

=== Babylon ===
A floating island facility built by Professor Babylon, which is named after her. It houses a library, a garden, an alchemy lab, a workshop, a hanger, a rampart, a laboratory, a storehouse, and a tower. It is also capable of developing a variety of weapons such as the Frame Gears. Prior to the series, Babylon was broken into nine pieces and scattered across the world. The Babylon Sisters were created to watch over each part of Babylon. One by one, Touya found each island piece and reassembled the facility.

Regina Babylon (レジーナ・バビロン, Rejīna Babiron)
Voiced by: Minako Kotobuki (Japanese); Terri Doty (English)
A scientist and the creator of the Babylon Sisters, Babylon, and the Frame Gears. She lived around 5000 years ago and was one of the citizens of the ancient Partheno Sacred Empire. She is mainly referred to as Professor Babylon. Touya usually speaks to her via holograms. She tasks Touya to find all the parts of Babylon to defeat the Phrase. It is later revealed that she converted herself into a cyborg, which explains how she was able to live for so long. She's a bisexual horny scientist who goes towards Touya and other females, and even delights teasing them mostly just Touya and his fiancées. Prof. Babylon designed her gynoids to manage each of pieces of the islands and to be highly sexual. In fact, it's revealed that each of them are designed with a fragment of her personality.
Francesca "Cesca" (フランシェスカ, Furanshesuka)
Voiced by: Rumi Okubo (Japanese); Brittney Karbowski (English)
A 5000-year old terminal gynoid, who received a task from Prof. Regina Babylon to manage the Sky Garden of Babylon. Her air frame number is 23. Additionally, she works as a maid at Brunhild Dukedom. She is Touya's personal maid after the contract was sealed with a kiss. Her personality is described as perverted and shameless when she does something lewd towards Touya at any opportunity she gets.
High Rosetta "Rosetta" (ハイロゼッタ, Hairozetta)
Voiced by: Madoka Asahina (Japanese); Jad Saxton (English)
A 5000-year old terminal gynoid, who received a task from Prof. Regina Babylon to manage the Workshop of Babylon. Her air frame number is 27. She is able to make anything from available resources with the exception of if she knows how to make it.
Bell Flora "Flora" (ベルフローラ, Berufurōra)
Voiced by: Hisako Kanemoto (Japanese); TBA (English)
A 5000-year old terminal gynoid, who received a task from Prof. Regina Babylon to manage the Alchemy Lab of Babylon. Her air frame number is 21. She has possessed medical knowledge and skill to a certain degree.
Fredmonica "Monica" (フレドモニカ, Furedomonika)
Voiced by: Miharu Hanai (Japanese); Brittany Lauda (English)
A 5000-year old terminal gynoid, who received a task from Prof. Regina Babylon to manage the Hangar of Babylon. Her air frame number is 28. She is shown to have some level of aptitude in mechanics. Monica plays well with other of her sisters, But never gets along with Atlantica "Tica" who is a Lolicon.
Preliora "Liora" (プレリオラ, Pureriora)
Voiced by: Moe Kahara (Japanese); Kelly Greenshield (English)
A 5000-year old terminal gynoid, who received a task from Prof. Regina Babylon to manage the Rampart of Babylon. Her air frame number is 20. She was Professor Babylon's sexual partner millennia ago. Liora was also the first of the gynoids built.
Pamela Noel "Noel" (パメラノエル, Pameranoeru)
Voiced by: Misaki Watada (Japanese); Lindsay Seidel (English)
A 5000-year old terminal gynoid, who received a task from Prof. Regina Babylon to manage the Tower of Babylon. Her air frame number is 25. She is lazy and sleepy, yet, she easily wakes up by the smell of hot food, which was the only way to bribe her.
Irisfam "Fam" (イリスファム, Irisufamu)
A 5000-year old terminal gynoid, who received a task from Prof. Regina Babylon to manage the Library of Babylon. Her air frame number is 24. Unlike the other gynoids, she has been awake for 5000 years, reading every book in the Library the entire time. Fam has a compatibility test is a series of riddles. She knows all kind of multiple languages of the Parthenon era and can also trace influences of it in more modern language.
Lileleparshe "Parshe" (リルルパルシェ, Riruruparushe)
A 5000-year old terminal gynoid, who received a task from Prof. Regina Babylon to manage the Storehouse of Babylon. Her air frame number is 26. She is highly energetic, excitable, handful and unbelievably clumsy, which resulted in a few being dropped to the surface, such as the jewel which reanimates the dead in Oedo, Eastern; bracelets of defense and magic resistance that enabled a coup in Regulus, and a few other incidents like dropping a magical picture frame at the noble castle in Regulus, leading to haunting stories that Touya and the others have to clean up, and the healing sword in Lestia which leads to the founding of the country less than 300 years ago.
Atlantica "Tica" (アトランティカ, Atorantika)
A 5000-year old terminal gynoid, who received a task from Prof. Regina Babylon to manage the Laboratory of Babylon. Her air frame number is 22. On the outside, she is well-mannered, hard-working, and responsible. Although, in reality, she is very perverted when it comes to little girls, especially Sue and Renne. Tica is the only gynoid that Monica, Touya, and his brides despise the most.

=== Kingdom of Belfast ===
This country was the first place that Touya had visited at the start of the story, which is where he met Sushie, Yae, the Silhoueska twins, Yumina, and Renne. It is located in the western Europa continent and also the second largest country in the west. The country largest and capital city is Alephis Capital City. It has relatively peaceful atmosphere thanks to the good management from its king, Tristwin Ernes Belfast. The country founded the West Alliance together with Kingdom of Mismede, which later evolved into the World Alliance.

Duke Alfred Ernes Ortlinde (アルフレッド・エルネス・オルトリンデ, Arufureddo Erunesu Orutorinde)
Voiced by: Taiten Kusunoki (Japanese); Christopher Sabat (English)
The duke of Belfast, the husband of Duchess Ellen, the father of Sue and Edward, the uncle of Yumina and Yamato, brother of King Tristwin, and brother-in-law of Queen Yuel. He comes to respect Touya after he saves his daughter and cures his wife's blindness.
Duchess Ellen Ernea Ortlinde (エレン・エルネア・オルトリンデ, Eren Erunea Orutorinde)
Voiced by: Asami Yano (Japanese); Tia Ballard (English)
The duchess of Belfast, the wife of Duke Alfred, the mother of Sue and Edward, the sister-in-law of King Tristwin and Queen Yuel, and the aunt of Yumina and Yamato. Prior to the series, she suffers an illness that renders her blind. Her father did cure his daughter's illness with null magic recovery, but aftereffects robbed her eyesight through the years that follow after the time of her father's death. After Touya cures her with the same magic, she and her family began to respect Touya. When Ellen and Alfred are having trouble conceiving another baby, Touya loans them a magical fertility-enhancing necklace named the Life Blesser, which ends up leading to the conception of Edward.
Edward Ernes Ortlinde (エドワード・エルネス・オルトリンデ, Edowādo Erunesu Orutorinde)
Alfred and Ellen's newborn son, Sue's baby brother, Yumina and Yamato's younger cousin, and Touya's second godson. He is now currently the next heir to the House of Ortlinde. He was born through a magical fertility-enhancing necklace lent to Ellen and Alfred by Touya helped Edward get conceived.
Leim (レイム, Reimu)
Voiced by: Tomomichi Nishimura (Japanese); Ben Phillips (English)
A butler who works for the Ortlindes. He is gravely injured during an attack by a magician who attempts to kidnap Sue, but Touya was able to save him. His recovery took part in earning the Ortlindes' respect.
Tristwin Ernes Belfast (トリストウィン・エルネス・ベルファスト, Torisutowin Erunesu Berufasuto)
Voiced by: Jouji Nakata (Japanese); David Wald (English)
The king of Belfast, the husband of Yuel Ernea, the brother of Duke Alfred, the father of Yumina, and the uncle of Sue and Edward. When Touya met him, he was poisoned by Count Balsa, but manages to cure him and expose Balsa's crimes. This earns his respect. Tristwin has offered Touya knighthood, but he knew Touya would turn that down, so he give him money and a mansion instead, Then, later in the series, he and the Emperor of Regulus made Touya the Grand Duke of Brunhild as they gave him the land between their countries and form a truce after the coup d'état in Regulus Empire.
Yuel Ernea Belfast (ユエル・エルネア・ベルファスト, Yueru Erunea Berufasuto)
Voiced by: Yumi Kakazu (Japanese); Morgan Lauré (English)
The queen of Belfast, the wife of Tristwin Ernes, the mother of Yumina and Yamato, the sister-in-law of Duke Alfred and Duchess Ellen, and the aunt of Sue and Edward. She comes to respect Touya after he saves her husband. She hoped her daughter would find someone special soon, and when Yumina chooses Touya, she gives her an engagement challenge to win Touya's heart and if she fails to make Touya hers, Yumina will end up being a nun, and he eventually gives in for Yumina's sake, which both she and her husband are pleased that their daughter did very well to succeed it.
Yamato Ernes Belfast (ヤマト・エルネス・ベルファスト, Yamato Erunesu Berufasuto)
Tristwin and Yuel's newborn son and Yumina's baby brother, Sue's younger cousin, Edward's older cousin, and Touya's first godson, He is now currently the next heir for the throne of the Kingdom of Belfast. Earlier in the series, his parents have no male heirs to inherented the throne, until Touya provided them with a fertility medicine from the Alchemy Lab of Babylon to bring the end of potential succession crisis. He became the most recent Sovereign Phrase core host after being born until his godfather magically removed Melle from Yamato without harming him.
Laim (ライム, Raimu)
Voiced by: Tomomichi Nishimura (Japanese); Charles Campbell (English)
A butler who used to work for the royal family of Belfast and the older brother of Leim. He has moved to the Belfast Mansion and Brunhild Dukedom to serve Touya as his personal butler for saving his younger brother from death and secretly watch over Yumina under her father's orders to ensured his daughter's safety, while handing over his position to his son.
Leon Blitz (レオン・ブリッツ, Reon Burittsu)
Voiced by: Hiroki Yasumoto (Japanese); Jarrod Greene (English)
The general of the Belfastian military and the father of Lyon. He was known as Fire Fist Leon when he's famously duel the stone golems with his pair of flame-enchanted gauntlets. Leon was gratefully impressed with Touya's heroic actions and pats his back hard in respect and declares that he likes him. Leon also forms an interclass friendship with Elze after he learns that she also specializes in hand to hand combat and gives her training.
Charlotte (シャルロッテ, Sharurotte)
Voiced by: Yūki Kuwahara (Japanese); Alexis Tipton (English)
The court magician of Belfast who takes an interest in Touya's magical abilities. She is a passionate woman with a thirst for knowledge. In the past, she was Leen's apprentice and has been tortured into a masochist by her sadist master as punishment for withholding information that did not do something that should be obvious.
Count Balsa (バルサ, Barusa)
Voiced by: Kōji Ishii (Japanese); Chris Guerrero (English)
The treacherous count of Belfast who hates beast-men and believes that humans are better than any other species. He opposed Tristwin's attempts to form an alliance with the Kingdom of Mismede. In an attempt to cancel the alliance, Balsa hired a magician to abduct Sue so he could control the duke. However, Touya saved Sue at the last second. After his plan to blackmail the duke failed, he then schemed to kill the king so that he could control Yumina, who was at the time the heir to the throne, by poisoning the wine glasses and use Olga as the scapegoat of the assassination by making her wine gift as the source of the poison. Despite how well planned out his assassination plot was, Touya ends up foiling his plans again by curing the king, clearing Olga's name, and proving Balsa to be the true mastermind behind the poisoning. After failing to escape, he was arrested and executed for his crimes alongside his assets who were involved in the conspiracy. Even his possession was being liquidated, while the rest of his family was exiled and their noble title was also annulled.
Lyon Blitz (リオン・ブリッツ, Rion Burittsu)
Voiced by: Soma Saito (Japanese); Ricco Fajardo (English)
A knight of Belfast and the son of Leon Blitz. He has feelings for Olga and forms a relationship with her with the help of Touya, his friends, and Arma. The two eventually got married later in the story.
Micah (ミカ, Mika)
Voiced by: Sayuri Hara (Japanese); Caitlin Glass (English)
Dolan's daughter and the owner of the Silver Moon Inn. When Touya first meets her, he stays and helps making improvements for the place. She later moves to Brunhild to open the Silver Moon's branch as its sole manager.
Aer (アエル, Aeru)
Voiced by: Mayu Yoshioka (Japanese); Natalie Hoover (English)
The owner of a café named Parent and Micah's close friend. When Touya first meets her, she needed to find a new kind of dessert for the customers, so he teaches her how to make ice cream and roll cakes. She later moves to Brunhild.
Zanac Zenfield (ザナック・ゼンフィエルド, Zanakku Zenfierudo)
Voiced by: Takuma Suzuki (Japanese); Mark Stoddard (English)
The owner of a clothes shop in Belfast. Upon meeting Touya, Zanac took him to Reflet Town where he bought the clothes Touya was wearing and gave him a new set of clothes. Zanac later opened a branch of his clothing store in Brunhild Dukedom at his behest and was later given several clothing designs by Touya as going away presents when they moved to Alephis to live in the mansion and the castle in Brunhild. Touya first encounters him in the new world.
Cecile (セシル, Seshiru)
Voiced by: Madoka Yonezawa (Japanese); Amanda Gish (English)
A maid who works at the Belfast Mansion and later in Brunhild. She is also a spy hired to watch over and protect Yumina. Although Touya finds out about this, he agrees not to tell Yumina. She is also assigned as a guardian and mentor for Renne, and she's very protective of her.
Lapis (ラピス, Rapisu)
Voiced by: Himika Akaneya (Japanese); Rachel Glass (English)
A headmaid who works at the Belfast Mansion and later in Brunhild. She is also a spy hired to watch over and protect Yumina. Although Touya finds out about this, he agrees not to tell Yumina. She is assigned as a guardian and mentor for Renne, and takes responsibility in teaching her how to be a headmaid and assigning Francesca and Renne as Touya's personal maids. Like Cecile, she is protective of her apprentice.
Prim (プリム)
Voiced by: Hazuki Ogino (Japanese); Kelsey Maher (English)
The receptionist of Belfast's guild. She handles guild's quest and magically stamps the adventurers cards when their jobs are done. When Prim heard that Touya is the owner of the Moon Reader café, she requested him to order many romantic books from Refreese Imperium for her and the female co-workers to read at the café whenever they have free time from work, mostly yaoi materials, including Reliel Rehm Refreese's own book series. Prim and her fellow guild workers formed good terms with Linze and Reliel who shared the same obsession.
Julio (フリオ, Furio)
He is the gardener of Touya's mansion. He later becomes a gardener fully dedicated to the Royal Palace of Brunhild. He is Claire's husband. He grows cherry trees in the Dukedom. Julio had an odd friendship with Cesca, one of the Babylon gynoids, as both of them enjoy gardening. Sometimes he acts like a father figure to Renne when Touya is not around as he helps Claire with matetnal care.
Claire (クレア, Kurea)
She is the cook of Touya's mansion. She later becomes a head chef of the Royal Palace of Brunhild. She is able to reproduce any recipe that she receives from Touya Mochizuki. She teaches Renne, Yae and Lu how to cook and make special meals for Touya and their families. She is Julio's wife. She had an interclass friendship with Lu, after the latter expressed interest in learning how to cook. Claire is also Renne's mother figure and treats her well as a daughter she and her husband never had.
Lim (リム, Rimu)
Voiced by: Yuka Amemiya (Japanese); Lara Woodhull (English)
A young girl whom Yae and Touya meet in Belfast after she was separated from her mother. The two help her find her mother.
Huck (ハック, Hakku)
A guard at the Embassy Building of Brunhild for the Kingdom of Belfast along with Thomas.
Thomas (トマス, Tomasu)
A guard at the Embassy Building of Brunhild for the Kingdom of Belfast along with Huck.
Carlossa Galune Swordrick (カルロッサ・ガルン・ソードレック, Karurossa Garun Sōdorekku)
A swordsman who was trained by Jubei Kokonoe. He holds the noble title of Viscount within the Kingdom of Belfast and is the recipient of the letter from Zanac Zenfield that Touya, Elze, and Linze go to the capital to deliver. He is also the person whom Yae Kokonoe is going to the capital to meet since he is acquainted with her father. Yae had a sparring match with Swordrick so she can gauge her progress of her training. Since he was trained by Jubei Kokonoe, he knows the same style as Yae although he is at a higher level than her, as it was shown that he can use the style's shadow move while Yae cannot.
Neil Suleiman (ニール・スレイマン, Nīru Sureiman)
The deputy general of Belfastian Knights. Touya assigns him to train Will so he can protect the girl he loves. Despite his old age and position, he's not above joking around with his friends. He was gifted with a transforming weapon that can turn into a spear, sword and dagger along with non-lethal mode with paralysis that Touya made for the order of knights. Neil has sternly and coldly delivered a serious speech to a group of prideful noble-born knights who had been harassing Touya and Elze before dismissing them from the order entirely, while Lyon reminds faithful to Neil.
Raul (ラウル, Rauru)
A royal doctor of Kingdom of Belfast. He serves the royal family for years and reminds faithful to them, even to Touya when he argeed to keep secrets while providing refuge to the Emperor of Regulus, Princess Lucia and Carol after saving them from a coup. Like all good doctors, Raul was able to tell immediately that Princess Lucia was smitten with Touya after he saved her life.
Simon (シモン, Simon)
The owner of the item shop in Reflet Town. He was mentioned when Touya's group was replenishing their hunting expendables.
Sushie's grandfather
Ellen's late father, Alfred's late father-in-law, and Sue's late maternal grandfather, who was mentioned by Sue while talking about curing Ellen's blindness. He seems to be the original user of null magic Recovery.
Sushie's grandmother
Ellen's mother, Alfred's mother-in-law, Sue's grandmother, who was mentioned by Sue after her rescue from attempted kidnapping. She was the only surviving relative in the royal family. Sue usually takes time off away from the royal capital so she can spend time her grandmother. When Touya made letterbox mirror portals, Alfred kindly asks him for a couple of them so Ellen and Sue can write letters to his mother-in-law.
Dolan (ドーラン, Dōran)
Voiced by: Nobuaki Kanemitsu (Japanese), Cris George (English)
Micah's father and the owner of the Silver Moon Inn in the town of Reflet. He is a former Blue-rank adventurer and a close friend of his co-adventurer Barral.
Barral (バラル, Bararu)
Voiced by: Kouzou Douzaka (Japanese), Jeremy Inman (English)
The owner of the Eight Bears weapon shop in the town of Reflet and a former Blue-rank adventurer and a close friend of his co-adventurer Dolan.
Renne's Father
Steph's husband, Carol's late brother-in-law, Mary's late son-in-law, and Renne's late father. He was mentioned by Renne after she and Touya first encountered, He was adventurer and raised his only daughter all by himself after his wife died shortly sometime ago after Renne was born. According to her, she and her father were staying in an inn, He drinks to his sorrows and talks endlessly about his beloved wife Steph while Renne watches and listen, although he never told her much about any her relatives at all. He was last seen and heard that he went off to take a monster subjection, Unfortunately, a year later, he never came back and was killed in action, leaving his daughter alone and homeless in the streets surviving with her dependence until she met Touya, who rescued and adopted her into his mansion and castle as a maid. Despite not telling Renne about her families on his side and Steph, he told her that her mother was happy looking at Renne a lot whenever she does before she died and left her enchanted necklace pendant as a memento to her husband and daughter.
Stephanie Rillettes (ステファニー・リレット, Sutefanī Riretto)
The older sister of Carol Rillettes, the elder daughter of Mary Rillettes, and the mother of Renne. She was only mentioned by Renne and Carol and she is also descendant of Kir Rillettes, the famous knight of Twelve Blades of the Empire. She was rebellious free spirited young noblewoman who lived in Regulus Empire with her family for seventeen years and had talent skills of swordsmanship. Her unnamed strict father gave her training; however, she hates being restricted by the rules of knights and always fights her father because of it.

=== Kingdom of Mismede ===
A kingdom where demi-humans mostly reside. The kingdom eventually forms an alliance with the Kingdom of Belfast. This is also where Touya met Leen.

Jamukha Blau Mismede (ジャムカ・ブラウ・ミスミド, Jamuka Burau Misumido)
Voiced by: Tetsu Inada (Japanese); R. Bruce Elliott (English)
The current king of Mismede. He is a tall muscular snow leopard demi-human who enjoys doing arena combats and other competitions. Sometimes, he goes out in disguise to clear his head from his duties, much to his ministers' annoyances.
Tilier Frau Mismede (ティリエ・フラウ・ミスミド, Tirie Furau Misumido)
The current Queen of the kingdom of Mismede. She is a snow leopard beastwoman.
Olga Strand (オリガ・ストランド, Origa Sutorando)
Voiced by: Kikuko Inoue (Japanese); Amber Lee Connors (English)
A fox demi-human who is Arma's older sister, Olba's elder daughter and the ambassador of Mismede. When Touya's group first met her, they helped reunite her with Arma. When Tristwin was poisoned by Count Balsa, he attempts to frame Olga by claiming that she sent poisoned wine to the king, but Touya proves her innocence and exposes Balsa as the true culprit. She has feelings for Lyon Blitz and Touya's group and Arma help them build up their relationship. They eventually got married later in the series.
Arma Strand (アルマ・ストランド, Aruma Sutorando)
Voiced by: Honoka Inoue (Japanese); Bryn Apprill (English)
A fox demi-human, the youngest daughter of Olba and the younger sister of Olga. Touya's group came across her after she got separated from her sister, so they help her find Olga. She and Touya and his group later help Olga and Lyon fall in love after discovering that they have feelings towards each other. She formed a good friendship with Sue and Renne.
Olba Strand (オルバ・ストランド, Oruba Sutorando)
Voiced by: Masaaki Ihara (Japanese): Alex Hom (English)
A merchant and the father of Olga and Arma. He makes good business with Touya when they first met in the Kingdom of Mismede. He's travelled far and wide to seek out interesting goods for his company to sell. Although he prefers Brunhild, as Touya is a veritable fountain of merchandise opportunities. He has two wives named Arisa and Irma Strand who are too fox demi-humans.
Solum (ソルム, Sorumu)
The village chief of Eld Village. His village was once raided by a black dragon, but Touya, who was nearby at that time, saved his village from destruction. He is a genial old man who does not seem to be greedy, having acknowledged and revered Touya and his group for defending his village. He also showed his gratitude by sharing the gift that the village got from his benefactor without any sense of greed.
Glatz (グラーツ, Gurātsu)
The chancellor of Mismede.
Garn (ガルン, Garun)
The captain of the Mismedian Knights.
Thea Frau Mismede (テア・フラウ・ミスミド, Tea Furau Misumido)
The First Princess of the kingdom of Mismede, Jamukha and Tiller's daughter, and Remza and Alba's older sister. At some point in the series, Karen (The Goddess of Love) eagerly pointed out the romance blooming between her and Prince Ridis Reek Refreese. They eventually got engaged.
Remza Blau Mismede (レムザ・ブラウ・ミスミド, Remuza Burau Misumido)
The First Prince of the kingdom of Mismede. Jamukha and Tiller's elder son, Thea's younger brother, and Alba's older brother.
Alba Blau Mismede (アルバ ブラウ ミスミド, Aruba Burau Misumido)
The Second Prince of the kingdom of Mismede. Jamukha and Tiller's youngest son, and Thea and Remza's youngest brother.
Arisa Strand (アリサ・ストランド, Arisa Sutorando)
A fox demi-human, one of Olba's wives, Ikusa's mother, and Olga and Arma's stepmother.
Irma Strand (イルマ・ストランド, Iruma Sutorando)
A fox demi-human, one of Olba's wives, Olga and Arma's mother, and Ikusa's stepmother.
Ikusa Strand (イクサ・ストランド, Ikusa Sutorando)
A fox demi-human, Olba and Arisa's son, and Olga and Arma's half-brother.
Eris (エリス, Erisu)
She's the current court mage of Mismede, Matriarch of the Fairies, and an old friend of Leen's. She is a lot more responsible and qualified for the fairy folk and the country's affairs than Leen. When Leen's engagement to Touya is announced to Mismede's nobility, she's the only one who opposes it, and puts Touya through a number of trials to prove that he's worthy of marrying Leen. After challenging Touya to a magical duel one of her trials for Leen's hand in marriage, naturally she lost and is forced to accept their engagement.

=== Divine Nation of Eashen ===
An island nation located in the eastern ocean and it is similar to Japan in Touya's old world. This is where Yae originally came from. Touya is also mistakenly thought to have come from here too. It is also where Touya found Sakura.

Jubei Kokonoe (ここのえじゅうべえ, Kokonoe Jūbee)
Voiced by: Takaya Kuroda (Japanese): Bill Jenkins (English)
The father of Yae and Jutaro. He is also the husband of Nanae. He comes to respect Touya after the battle in Eashen, and felt proud of his daughter Yae when he finds out she's serving as a personal bodyguard to the Princess of Belfast Yumina, and again when he finds out that she and Touya got engaged.
Nanae Kokonoe (ここのえななえ, Kokonoe Nanae)
Voiced by: Sayaka Ohara (Japanese): Nicole Endicott (English)
The wife of Jubei Kokonoe and the mother of Jutaro Kokonoe and Yae Kokonoe. She comes to respect Touya after the battle in Eashen, and she apparently knew that Yae would end up marrying him some day, something that came as a surprise to her husband. Nanae is also close to her family maid Ayane before she married her son Jutaro and became part of the Kokonoe family later in the series.
Jutaro Kokonoe (ここのえじゅうたろう, Kokonoe Jūtarō)
Voiced by: Yūki Inoue (Japanese); Stephen Fu (English)
A samurai and member of the Takeda faction. He is Yae's older brother. Jutaro is also a soldier. Later in the series, he married the family maid Ayane whom he's in love with.
Ayane (綾音, Ayane)
Voiced by: Yui Otagiri (Japanese): Jeannie Tirado (English)
A maid who works for the Kokonoe family. Later in the series, she married Jutaro and become properly part of the family.
Takeda Shingen (たけだしんげん, Takeda Shingen)
A daimyō from Eashen. After being betrayed and murdered by Yamamoto Kansuke, his corpse was used to fight against Touya and the Elite Four, but after Kansuke was killed, his corpse becomes lifeless again. Shingen was said to have been a good warrior and leader.
Tsubaki (椿, Tsubaki)
Voiced by: Yū Kobayashi (Japanese); Dawn M. Bennett (English)
One of the members of the Takeda's Elite Four. She works with Touya to take down Yamamoto Kansuke. Following the downfall of her clan, she and her people move to Brunhild. She is now currently the chief of Brunhild's intelligence unit. In some point of the series, Tsubaki mentored Touya and Yae's daughter Yakumo for infiltration skills.
Baba Nobuharu (ばばのぶはる, Baba Nobuharu)
Voiced by: Kenji Hamada (Japanese); Cris George (English)
One of the Elite Four of the Takeda faction. He was originally from Eashen before he moved to Brunhild.
Kousaka Masanobu (こうさかまさのぶ, Kōsaka Masanobu)
One of the Elite Four of the Takeda faction. He was originally from Eashen before he moved to Brunhild. He works as Brunhild's prime minister and is also responsible for the development of the country.
Yamagata Masakage (やまがたまさかげ, Yamagata Masakage)
Voiced by: Itou Kentarou (Japanese); Orion Pitts (English)
One of the Elite Four of the Takeda faction. He was originally from Eashen before he moved to Brunhild.
Naito Masatoyo (ないとうまさとよ, Naitō Masatoyo)
Voiced by: Daisuke Kishio (Japanese); Daman Mills (English)
One of the Elite Four of the Takeda faction. He was originally from Eashen before he moved to Brunhild.
Yamamoto Kansuke (やまもとかんすけ, Yamamoto Kansuke)
Voiced by: Kenjiro Tsuda (Japanese); Dave Trosko (English)
An evil necromancer who plans to stir up a war between the Takeda clan and the Tokugawa clan. He betrays and murders Shingen, using his corpse to fight Touya and the Elite Four using an immortality gem (which is the source of his corruption) embedded in his eye. Touya defeats him by removing the gem and destroying it, which kills him along with his army of undead corpses. It is later discovered that the immortality gem came from the Storehouse of Babylon.
Tokugawa Ieyasu (川とくがわいえやす, Tokugawa Ieyasu)
Voiced by: Tesshō Genda (Japanese), Kent Williams (English)
One of the nine lords of Eashen.
Takeda Katsuyori (たけだかつより, Takeda Katsuyori)
The son of former daimyō, Takeda Shingen. He became the new daimyō after Kansuke Yamamoto was dealt with. Unlike his father, Katsuyori was said to be a bad leader; an example of this would be when he raised taxes because he ran out of money and because he neglects his duty. It was he who caused the disbandment of the Takeda house.

=== Kingdom of Sandora ===
A country located to the south of Kingdom of Mismede past the Great Sea of Trees. It is the only kingdom that allows slavery and slave trade. The kingdom was eventually destroyed by Touya, who liberated all the slaves. Now the land is called the Region of Sandora.

Rebecca (レベッカ, Rebekka)
Voiced by: Sarah Emi Bridcutt (Japanese); Brianna Roberts (English)
A former mercenary-turned-adventurer from Sandora. She, Logan, and Will rescued seven slave girls and attempted to flee the kingdom, but came under attack by a Sandworm in the light novel and manga, or a Phrase in the anime. After Touya rescues them and removes the slave girls' enslavement collars, he lets them stay at the Belfast Mansion until they can find work. After the Moon Reader Café was established, she became a security guard of the café. She also became a member of the Knights Order in Brunhild. Rebecca even formed good friendship with Carol Rillettes due to their mutual ties with Touya and his brides.
Logan (ローガン, Rōgan)
Voiced by: Wataru Komada (Japanese); TBA (English)
A former mercenary-turned-adventurer from Sandora. He, Rebecca, and Will rescued seven slave girls and attempted to flee the kingdom, but came under attack by a Sandworm in the light novel and manga, or a Phrase in the anime. After Touya rescues them and removes the slave girls' enslavement collars, he lets them stay at the Belfast Mansion until they can find work. After the Moon Reader Café was established, he became a security guard of the café. He also became a member of the Knights Order in Brunhild. He is also engaged to an unknown person.
Will (ウィル, Wiru)
Voiced by: Aimi Tanaka (Japanese): Kristen McGuire (English)
A former mercenary-turned-adventurer from Sandora. He, Rebecca, and Logan rescued seven slave girls and attempted to flee the kingdom, but came under attack by a Sandworm in the light novel and manga, or a Phrase in the anime. After Touya rescues them and removes the slave girls' enslavement collars, he lets them stay at the Belfast Mansion until they can find work. After the Moon Reader Café was established, he became a security guard of the café. He also became a member of the Knights Order in Belfast. Because he has feelings for Wendy, one of the former slave girls, Touya decides to have him train with the knights so he can protect her.
Wendy (ウェンディ, Wendi)
Voiced by: Momoko Nishio (Japanese); TBA (English)
A slave girl from Sandora, outfitted with an enslavement collar that prevents her from disobeying orders. Following the death of her owner, she was rescued by Rebecca, Logan, and Will along with six other slave girls. She is the youngest of the slaves. While attempting to flee the kingdom, they were attacked by a Sandworm in the light novel and manga, or a Phrase in the anime. After Touya rescues them and removes her and the other slave girls' collars, he lets them stay at the Belfast Mansion until they can find work. After the Moon Reader Café was established, she works as a waitress in the café along with the other former slave girls. She is in love with Will who is now training in the Knights Order in Belfast in order to become strong enough to protect her.
Sulas (スーラス, Sūrasu)
One of the slaves that was rescued from Sandora by Rebecca's group and Touya, who helps remove her enslavement collar. She works as a receptionist at the Moon Reader Café.
Belle (ベル, Beru)
One of the slaves that was rescued from Sandora by Rebecca's group and Touya, who helps remove her enslavement collar. She currently works at the Moon Reader Café as a receptionist.
Nia (ニア)
One of the slaves that was rescued from Sandora by Rebecca's group and Touya, who helps remove her enslavement collar. She works as a cook at the Moon Reader Café. She is Mia's older sister.
Mia (ミア)
One of the slaves that was rescued from Sandora by Rebecca's group and Touya, who helps remove her enslavement collar. She is currently working as a cook in the Moon Reader Café. She is Nia's younger sister.
Sylvie (シルヴィ, Shiruvi)
One of the slaves that was rescued from Sandora by Rebecca's group and Touya, who helps remove her enslavement collar. She works as a waitress in the Moon Reader Café.
Marika (マリカ)
One of the slaves that was rescued from Sandora by Rebecca's group and Touya, who helps remove her enslavement collar. She works as a waitress in the Moon Reader Café.
Abdul Jafar Sandora III (アブダル・ジャーバ・サンドラ三世, Abudaru Jāba Sandora Sansei)
He was the last king of Sandora and was the owner of all slaves in the Kingdom's domain. He was killed by one of his former slaves during Touya's visit to the country. Due to an intense grudge that he held against Touya, he was able to return to life as zombie to try and exact revenge against him. However, this attempt ended in dismal failure.

=== Regulus Empire ===
A kingdom located in the west of the continent and is the largest country in the west. This is where Touya met Lucia and finds Renne's long lost family.

Zephyrus Roa Regulus (ゼフィルス・ロア・レグルス, Zefirusu Roa Regurusu)
The emperor of the Regulus Empire and the father of Lucia, Sarah, Elysia and Lux. General Bazoar tries to murder him in hopes of taking over the nearby kingdoms, but he is saved by Touya. After foiling Bazoar's plan, he joins Touya's alliance.
Caroline Rillettes (キャロライン・リエット, Kyarorain Rietto)
The loyal and kind-hearted second-born daughter of the Rillettes House, and a knight of the Regulus Empire & Lucia's bodyguard. She prefers to be called by her nickname, Carol (キャロル, Kyaroru). She is also Renne's maternal aunt, but she detests being called "aunt", so Renne calls her "sis" instead. She is a descendant of Kir Rillettes, a member of the Twelve Blades of the Empire, who were the loyal retaining knights who helped the first emperor found the country. Ever since her rebellious, free-spirited older sister Stephanie (or Steph) ran away from home after an argument with their strict father, she has missed her dearly, but she was happy to hear that she has a niece named Renne. When the House of Rillettes is on a brink of declined over a lack of great deeds for years, Carol has been devoting her life to restore the family's reputation. Thanks to Touya who saved her life from the evil soldiers, she has performed great deeds in stopping the coup and secured the family household. Like her ancestors and her only niece Renne, Carol has the affinity of wind magic. She also mentored Lucia with combat skills of twin blades, Now with Cecile and Lapis help, she takes charge of training Renne with dagger and twin blade defence. She even formed good friendships with Rebecca and Lain Netherland due to mutual ties with Touya and his brides. Carol frequenty visits Brunhild to see her niece and Lucia while taking off-duties from Regulus, She is hot-blooded when it comes to battle and personal grievance. Despite being single and never married, which worries her mother, she was proud and happy enough to have earned Renne's confidence about her aunt's lifestyle and hopes of finding the right man to marry.
General Bazoar (バズール, Bazūru)
A wicked general who seeks to conquer the surrounding kingdoms. He wields two magical bracelets that allow him to resist magic and physical attacks, and can summon a large demon monster called the Demon Lord. He attempts to murder Zephyrus and his family to take over Regulus and declare war on the nearby kingdoms, but Touya saves them and defeats him by exposing him to a foul stench created by Sludge-slime. It is later revealed that his magic bracelets came from the Storehouse of Babylon. So far, he is the only human antagonist who was able to mostly stand a chance against Touya, but still proved to be no match for him.
General Romero (ロメロ, Romero)
A loyal general who has no intention of following Bazoar's treachery and coup. He was providing the prince a place to hide until Bazoar is defeated.
Lux Roa Regulus (ルクス・レア・レグルス, Rukusu Rea Regurusu)
The prince of the Regulus Empire, Zephyrus's son, and Lucia, Sarah, Elysia's brother. He attempted to escape the palace during the coup by disguising himself as a knight. Unfortunately, the knights were among the people being targeted by the military. But luckily, Lux was given a heads start when Touya saved him before the confrontation with General Bazoar. He has multiple concubines, but he had difficulty fathering children with his royal harem. So he required a special medicine requested by his father, from Touya, to get each of them pregnant.
Mary Rillettes (メアリー・リレット, Mearī Riretto)
The matriarch of the Rillettes family, Steph and Carol's mother and Renne's grandmother. A kind elderly woman who accepted Renne's choice to remain in Belfast and Brunhild as a maid and stay on Touya's side rather than join nobility. She's happy, yet mildly shocked to suddenly find herself with such a big grandchild. Mary gives Carol plenty of space, but does not hesitate to nag her remaining and youngest daughter about how she is still single at her age, She wishes Carol to find a good son-in-law and sees her own children before Mary joins her eldest daughter and husband in the afterlife. Mary originally wants to visit Belfast to meet her long lost granddaughter, but Carol stopped her because she prefer that she brings Renne up to the Rillettes Household to meet her mother. Mary was joyfully pleased that Renne cooked a special meal for her as gratitude for their meeting and acceptance. They usually allow to visit each other and exchange letters through mirror portals that Touya gave them. She also frequenty visits Brunhild to spend hoildays with her granddaughter as well having quality time with her at Regulus.
Robinson (ロビンソン)
A huge muscular butler who has been serving the Rillettes family for years. He was excited to meet Renne, the long lost daughter of Stephanie Rillettes and is happy to assist her with a special dish for her family.
Carol's Father
The patriarch of the Rillettes family, Mary's husband, Steph and Carol's father and Renne's grandfather. He was only mentioned by Carol when she told Touya about her older sister's disappearance. He was a loyal and strict knight who gave both of his daughters swordsmanship training. Despite this, Steph hates being restricted by the rules of knights and rebelliously fights her father, leading her to run away from home to settle down in Belfast. After years of lamenting over his behavior for being too hard on his elder daughter, he died of an unknown cause. Carol and Mary did hope that he and Steph reconciled in the afterlife.

=== Kingdom of Lihnea ===
A kingdom located on the southern half of the Island of Palnea. It borders the northern the Kingdom of Palouf and had many previous skirmishes in the past, though they have never developed into a war.

Cloud Zeph Lihnea (クラウド・ゼフ・リーニエ, Kuraudo Zefu Rīnie)
Voiced by: Shunichi Toki (Japanese); Justin Briner (English)
The (true) prince of the Lihnea kingdom, the son of Schlaf and Erya, and the (fake) stepbrother of Zabune. He comes to Brunhild to seek Touya's help in saving his mother, who is held hostage by Zabune and his parents who are scheming to take over Lihnea, murder Cloud and his father, and start a war with the Kingdom of Palouf. Once Erya is rescued, Touya exposes their plan, allowing the king to retire and pass the throne to Cloud, who has Zabune and his parents sold into slave labor in Sandora. He then joins Touya's alliance. He is engaged to Princess Lucienne Dia Palouf and also has formed good terms with Touya and King Reidhard.
Schlaf Zeph Lihnea (シュラフ・ゼフ・リーニエ, Shurafu Zefu Rīnie)
Voiced by: Mitsuru Miyamoto (Japanese); TBA (English)
The former ruler of Lihnea, Erya's husband, and Cloud's father. Wardack kidnaps his mistress to force him to cooperate with his plan to take over the kingdom, and later kill him and his son. However, Touya saves Erya, allowing him to pass the throne to Cloud without any threats so he can retire and be with his new wife and spending the rest of his days doting on her to make up for lost time.
Erya Zes Lihnea (エリア・ゼス・リーニエ, Eria Zesu Rīnie)
Voiced by: Namiko Morimoto (Japanese); Diane Meo (English)
Schlaf's mistress then official wife and the mother of Cloud. Wardack and his family kidnap her to force the king to help them with their plans. She is rescued by Touya, who later foils Wardack's plans. She was born to commoner parents who abandoned her, but was eventually adopted by a loving family of merchants. She then became the King's lover and eventually his wife.
Marquis Koupe (クープ, Kūpu)
Voiced by: Susumu Akagi (Japanese); TBA (English)
The current prime minister who is a close ally to Cloud. When Wardack came into power, he was removed from his position. Following the defeat of Wardack and his family and Cloud becoming king, he was reinstalled and had all the nobles who helped Wardack banished.
Zabune (ザブン)
Voiced by: Jun Fukushima (Japanese); Dallas Reid (English)
Cloud's cruel stepbrother, who tends to keep female slaves. He is later revealed to be Wardack and Dacia's son, meaning that he and Cloud are not blood related. They plot to kill Cloud and his father so they can take over Lihnea and declare war on Palouf. They also kidnap Cloud's mother Erya to force the king to help. Zabune also intends to marry Sue and enslave her to support his rise to the throne, but the proposal was canceled when he learns that Sue is engaged to Touya (who is actually doing this to protect her). In retaliation, he tries to have Cloud spread rumors about Touya to ruin his reputation in hopes of preventing the engagement, which Cloud refuses to do, not realizing that Touya had overheard his entire scheme. After Touya rescues Erya and a slave girl named Fleur that Zabune recently bought, he then foils Wardack's plan, leading Cloud to become the new king and had Zabune and his parents sentenced to death, but secretly sold to a slave trader who sends them to work as slaves in Sandora. Zabune at first vowed revenge on Touya, but he violently discourages him from trying.
Dacia (ダキア, Dakia)
Voiced by: Kyou Yaoya (Japanese); Corey Pettit (English)
Zabune's mother and Wardack's cousin and secret wife. She and her family plan to kill Cloud and his father so they can take over Lihnea and declare war on Palouf. They kidnap Cloud's mother Erya to force the king to help. After Touya rescues Erya, he then foils their plot, leading Cloud to become the new king and had Dacia and her family sentenced to death, but secretly sold to a slave trader who sends them to work as slaves in Sandora.
Wardack (ワルダック, Warudakku)
Voiced by: Masafumi Kimura (Japanese); TBA (English)
The former prime minister, who is Zabune's father and Dacia's cousin and secret husband. He and his family seek to kill Cloud and his father so they can take over Lihnea and declare war on Palouf. They kidnap Cloud's mother Erya to force the king to help. After Touya rescues Erya and exposes their plot, Cloud becomes the new king and has Wardack and his family sentenced to death, but secretly sold to a slave trader who sends them to work as slaves in Sandora.
Fleur (フルール, Furūru)
A female slave that Zabune bought from a Sandora merchant. Touya later rescues her and removes her enslavement collar before Zabune can kill her for her disobedience by crippling the collar. After the situation in Lihnea, Touya sends her to Brunhild where she took a job as a cook at the Silver Moon Inn and formed good terms with Micah and Aer.
Angie (アンジー, Anjī)
A chambermaid who was one of Marquis Koupe's personal maids assigned to protect Erya, who was imprisoned in a fortress tower, in order to protect her from Wardack's men. After Wardack and Dacia's schemes were exposed, she continues to serve as Erya's own personal maid and bodyguard.

=== Kingdom of Lestia ===
A kingdom that was once ruled by Galen Yunas Lestia before he retired and gave the throne to his son, Reid Yunas Lestia, who will later pass it down to his son, Reinhard Yunas Lestia. This kingdom is also a member of the World Alliance. This is where Touya first met Hildegard.

Galen Yunas Lestia (ギャレン・ユナス・レスティア, Gyaren Yunasu Resutia)
Voiced by: Kenichi Ogata (Japanese); TBA (English)
Hildegard's grandfather who takes an interest in Touya and his technology. He was the former king of Lestia and a gold rank adventurer. Despite his old age, he is a powerful swordsman. During his visit to Brunhild, he challenges his granddaughter to prove if she is worthy to be Touya's next fiancée, but ends up losing due to Touya distracting him, and he approves of their future marriage. Galen is a perverted old man with a bad habits of harassing any attractive women that catches his eye by groping their buttocks in quick flash, which proves to be an annoyance to his son and granddaughter; the only woman he can never grope on is Touya's fake older sister Karen Mochizuki (the Goddess of Love).
Reid Yunas Lestia (リード・ユナス・レスティア, Rīdo Yunasu Resutia)
He is Galen's son, Esther's husband, and Hildegard and Reinhard's father. He was the former king of Lestia, he retired from the throne leaving his elder son Reinhard in his stead after the abdication ceremony by knighting him with a sacred Holy Sword of Lestia that Touya fixed, which turned out to be the missing Recovery Blade from the Storehouse of Babylon and made by Regina Babylon, and it also has not been used since Hilde's knighting when it got broken until Touya repaired it with his magic. Reid was pleased about the sword restored to its original condition and his daughter's engagement to Touya. Like his daughter, he is disgusted and embarrassed by his own father's perverted behavior.
Esther Minas Lestia (エスター・ミナス・レスティア, Esutā Minasu Resutia)
She is Galen's daughter-in-law, Reid's wife, and Hildegard and Reinhard's mother. She is the former queen of Lestia. Like all the rest of her family, she was happy for Hildegard's engagement to Touya and how he fixed the sacred Holy Sword of Lestia (Recovery Blade).
Reinhard Yunas Lestia (ラインハルト・ユナス・レスティア, Rainharuto Yunasu Resutia)
He is Galen's grandson, Hildegard's older brother, and Reid and Esther's elder son. He is current king of Lestia after the abdication ceremony by knighting him with a sacred Holy Sword of Lestia (Recovery Blade) which was broken after his sister's knighting, so they cannot have the ceremony without it, even the greatest blacksmith can never restoring because of the blade's material. They have no choice but prepare a fake sword and they didn't made one yet. But luckily, Touya manages to fix it with his magic. Now the blade has been restored to its original condition, the ceremony for Reinhard's abdication has proceed as planned. He is happily married to Sophia and expecting their first child named Beatrice. He has formed good terms with Touya and Cloud, especially as they approach to helping each other getting Cloud together with Princess Lucienne.

=== Refreese Imperium ===
One of the major countries in the world. It is amongst of those countries that already forms good terms with its neighbouring kingdom of Belfast south east of it. Linze and Elze's uncle, aunt, and cousins live here.

Rig Reek Refreese (ゼフィルス・ロア・レグルス, Zefirusu Roa Regurusu)
Voiced by: Masaki Terasoma (Japanese); TBA (English)
The imperator of the Refreese Imperium, husband of Zelda Rehm Refreese and father of Reliel and Ridis. When he came to Belfast with Tristwin to meet Touya in the mansion, he was very informed about Touya's heroic actions and his new country establishment, According to Touya, he looks like Bruce Willis. Rig is deeply worry for his daughter's future for not been engaged and pushy about finding a fiancé for her, so he nearly offers Touya to Reliel's hand in marriage, but he rejects it due to him disliking her, which her father took very well for the time being. Even supposedly he, his wife and son did not know that Reliel is secretly a famous romantic novelist and a yaoi fangirl, and writes her own yaoi, yuri and reverse-harem materials.
Zelda Rehm Refreese (ゼルダ・レーム・リーフリース, Zeruda Rēmu Rīfurīsu)
The queen of the Refreese Imperium, wife of Rig Reek Refreese, and mother of Reliel and Ridis. Like the rest of her family, she supposedly doesn't know about her daughter's hidden secrets as a yaoi fangirl and a novelist of gay and reverse-harem romances.
Reliel Rehm Refreese (リリエル・リーム・リーフリース, Ririeru Rīmu Rīfurīsu)
Voiced by: Misaki Kuno (Japanese); Lindsay Sheppard (English)
The princess of the Refreese Imperium, daughter of Rig Reek Refreese the imperator and Queen Zelda Rehm Refreese and older sister of Ridis. She secretly writes romantic novel series of all kinds of genres from yaoi to yuri, even reverse-harem under her pen name Riel Rifrese. She is a friend and big sister figure of Yumina's because she's the only one who knows Reliel's secrets and supports her hobbies alongside Lucia, Leen, and Sakura, who become part of her key confidantes and strongest supporters. She's also became good friends with Linze, Including Prim and her fellow guild receptionists due to their love for yaoi novels and supports her writing endeavors. She was so completely over-obsessed with gay romance between males that she gets wrong ideas when she first met Touya at the local book store at Refreese, believing he's into those materials and men. Once Yumina clears the misunderstanding, Touya helps her get the book that she wanted by creating a copy of it from the workshop, But she disappointed that he's not a fan of the yaoi literature, as much to his chagrin he threatens her with his hand chop. Afterwards, Reliel begins to starts writing a rather unsettling reverse-harem story with the main characters based on Touya and his fiancés, including her younger brother and Touya's male acquaintance he interacts with, even adding hot springs for the erotic romantic scenes for other stories; Touya swears revenge on her for humiliating him. She is also engaged to an unknown person, which is good news for Touya since he did not want to marry her due to his personal issues towards Reliel. But, later at some point in the series, her fiancé ran away with a commoner girl, which doesn't upsets Reliel due to a political marrage arranged by her father, who was pushy about finding her a fiancé. However, during a masquerade ball incident, she was saved from a creepy nobleman by a dashing young man, only to learn afterwards that it was Princess Listis Le Triharan of the Triharan Holy Empire, who was raised as a boy to prevent the corrupt nobles of the senate from forcing her into a marriage with one of their own. This whole set up reminded Reliel of one of her own yuri novel series "Defenders of the Lily", and it didn't change her romantic infatuation with Listis and her masculine charm due to her bisexuality. It also implies Princesss Reliel and Litis might be are on the road to becoming a couple. Reliel also had been givin' a nickname "Lady Riri" or "Sister Riri" by Yumina."
Ridis Reek Refreese (リディス・リーク・リフリーズ, Ridisu Rīku Rifurīzu)
The crown prince of the Refreese Imperium, son of Rig Reek Refreese the Imperator and Queen Zelda Rehm Refreese, and younger brother of Reliel Rehm Refreese. Like his parents, he is supposedly not aware that his sister's secret of writing romantic gay novels. Later in the series, Karen (The Goddess of Love) eagerly pointed out the romance blooming between him and Princess Thea of Mismede. They eventually got engaged.
Joseph (ジョセフ, Josefu)
Elze and Linze's uncle on their mom's side and Lana's husband. His family lives on a farm in the countryside of Refreese and raised the twins after their parents died. He often finds it difficult to converse with city folk, even royalties due to nervous frenzy in his youth.
Lana (ラナ, Rana)
Elze and Linze's aunt and Joseph's wife. Her family lives on a farm in the countryside of Refreese and raised the twins after their parents died. Unlike her husband, she's much more kindly and outgoing to city folk and royalty. She's incredibly friendly and welcoming to Touya.

=== Ramissh Theocracy ===
Unlike most countries, it is not ruled by a hereditary monarch, but it instead elects a Pope from the highest ranked priests. The Pope rules the country until they either die or abdicate the throne. It is later discovered that the Theocracy was under the spell of the Dark Spirit and that its religion was formed under a lie. The Dark Spirit was later defeated by Touya.

Elias Altra (エリアス・オルトラ, Eriasu Orutora)
The current pope of Ramissh who ruled the country and discovered the truth about the Theocracy and the Dark Spirit, as she knew from the beginning that the god of light named Lars they originally worshiped was not real and was the only member of the church willing to admit it. Like Yumina, she possesses the Null magic "Mystic Eyes" of sincerity that allow her to see when a person is lying or telling the truth. Elias was locked up in prison alongside her fellow priestess Phyllis until Touya came to the rescue in return to meet God in person. She gave Touya respect after saving Theocracy, her own life, and Phyllis'. She was the first person besides Phyllis that Touya revealed to that his "relatives" were in fact Gods.
Phyllis Rugit (フィリス・ルギット, Firisu Rugitto)
A priestess of Ramissh who accompanied the envoy that wished to put the Ramissh Theocracy's religion on Brunhild. However, after Touya refused to allow a single religion dominate his country and snapped at her superior for insulting the God that Touya believed in. Phyllis got to meet the God in charge of the world, who told her that Gods only watch over them and will never interfere; meaning that the Theocracy was built on a lie. Phyllis was later saved from execution along with the Pope Elias, who were the only ones not under the spell of the Dark Spirit, who was the real "god" of the religion. After its destruction by Touya, Phyllis is promoted to cardinal and became Elias' next in-line because she had the right mindset to succeed her.
Nest Renaud (ネスト・レナード, Nesuto Renādo)
A priest who only cares about raising his status and will easily takes offense when things do not go his way. He is known to wear wigs. He was later arrested and imprisoned alongside his fellow corrupt officials.
Cardinal Kyurei
The older sister of Cardinal Zeon. She posed as the Pope of Ramissh during Touya's visit to the country. Kyurei are one of corrupt officials who upheld the lie about their deity Lars in ursuit of power. She was later arrested and imprisoned.
Cardinal Zeon
The younger brother of Cardinal Kyurei. Zeon is one of the corrupt officials who worked to maintain the lie of their religion in pursuit of power. Both him and his older sister were later arrested and imprisoned.
Ramirez
The founder of the Ramissh Theocracy. Originally believed to be a priest that summoned the god of light that purified the land, though it was later discovered that he was a magician that possessed the darkness attribute.

=== Divine Realm ===
A place where gods mostly resides. This is where Touya ended up following his accidental death. Many of the gods here pretend to be Touya's relatives whenever they visit him.

God (神様, Sekai Kami-sama)
Voiced by: Fumihiko Tachiki (Japanese); Barry Yandell (English)
At the start of the series, he accidentally kills Touya and as an apology, he revives him in a new world and grants him immense power that renders him almost undefeatable, also allowing him to keep his smartphone. He usually contacts Touya using the phone and whenever he shows up in person, he pretends to be Touya's grandfather under the alias Shinnosuke Mochizuki (望月神之助, Mochizuki Shinnosuke). He is also known as the God of Worlds.
Goddess of Love (恋愛神, Ren'ai-shin)
Voiced by: Yui Horie (Japanese); Jamie Marchi (English)
A goddess from the Divine Realm who controls romantic related matters. She is currently in the Brunhild Dukedom and pretending to be Touya Mochizuki's older sister under the alias Karen Mochizuki (望月花恋, Mochizuki Karen).
Goddess of Swords (剣神, Kenjin)
A goddess from the Divine Realm who is skilled with sword techniques. While in Brunhild, she uses the alias Moroha Mochizuki (望月諸刃, Mochizuki Moroha) and pretends to be Touya's second older sister. She usually mentors Touya and Yae in combat skills.
God of Agriculture (農耕神, Nōkōshin)
A god from the Divine Realm who pretends to be Touya's uncle when he visits Brunhild under the alias Kousuke Mochizuki (望月耕助, Mochizuki Kōsuke). He is very helpful to Touya when it comes to harvesting.
God of Combat (武神, Bushin)
A god from the Divine Realm who pretends to be Touya's uncle when he visits Brunhild under the alias Takeru Mochizuki (望月武道, Mochizuki Takeru). He mentors Ende and Elze in combat training.
Goddess of Space-Time (時空神, Jikūshin)
A goddess from the Divine Realm who pretends to be Touya's grandmother when she visits Brunhild under the alias Tokie Mochizuki (望月時江, Mochizuki Tokie).
God of Music (音楽神, Ongakushin)
A god from the Divine Realm who pretends to be one of Touya's cousins and Kousuke's eldest son when he visits Brunhild under the alias Sousuke Mochizuki (望月奏助, Mochizuki Sōsuke). He is skilled with playing music.
Goddess of the Hunt (狩猟神, Shuryōshin)
A goddess from the Divine Realm who pretends to be one of Touya's cousins and Kousuke's eldest daughter when she visits Brunhild under the alias Karina Mochizuki (望月狩奈, Mochizuki Karina). She loves to hunt.
Goddess of Alcohol (酒神, Sakeshin)
A lesser goddess from the Divine Realm who pretends to be one of Touya's cousins and Kousuke's second daughter under the alias Suika Mochizuki (望月酔花, Mochizuki Suika). She resembles a little girl and loves to drink alcohol.

=== Other characters ===
Ende (エンデ, Ende)
Voiced by: Yuma Uchida (Japanese); Howard Wang (English)
A mysterious young boy with powerful abilities, who suddenly appears at the commercial area of the southern district of Belfest. He encounters Touya at some points during his travels. Later, it is revealed that his real name is Endymion (エンデミュオン, Endemyuon). He's revealed to be a unique humanoid called a Drifter from a dimensional world Phrasia and he's been traveling across worlds searching for the dormant Sovereign Phrase, Melle for nearly 5000 years. He has two allies: Ney and Lycee. Sometime later, he, Ney, and Lycee married Melle and had a daughter named Allistella, or Allis for short.
Dark Magician
This unnamed mage was hired by Count Balsa to kidnap Sue in order to blackmail her father. He can use dark magic and can summon Lizardmen. His attack was foiled by Touya, Elze, Linze and Yae.
Melle (メル, Meru)
The former ruler of the Phrase. Melle spends nearly 5000 years of running away from her dimensional homeworld Phrasia, because she dislikes her role and wants to be free of them and abdicating to her younger brother Halle. She had been stayed dormant in the form of a nucleus inside of living beings many times down to her last host, Yamato, Yumina's little brother, until Touya extracted her from his godson's body and gave her a pendent that makes her appear human. She stayed at Brunhild for a while as a refugee. She soon marries Ende, Ney, and Lycee, then she and Ende had a daughter named Allistella.
Ney (ネイ, Nei)
One of Ende's allies and Lycee's sister. She was very short temper, aggressive and ruthless, especially towards Ende. However, this was merely because of her extreme loyaity to Melle. So, Ney wishes to remain on her side rather than serving any other Sovereign. She later marries Melle.
Lycee (リゼ, Rize)
One of Ende's allies and Ney's sister. She has always been considerd an oddball by many. Unlike her aggressive sister, Lycee is quite, reserve and usually does things at her own pace, Yet she is loyal to Melle as well Ende and sworn to protect her from the invading Phrase. She later marries Melle.
Allistella (アリステラ, Arisutera)
Ende and Melle's daughter. Her nickname is Allis (アリス, Arisu). She is good friends with Linne and has a crush on Kuon. Later in the series, she and Kuon are engaged. Allis does often get mistaken for a boy by Touya because of her toyboyish appearance.
Halle
Melle's younger brother who has abdicating in his sister's place, Like his future niece Allis, He had an androgynous appearance and often mistaken for a girl and dressed up like one due to his feminine like appearance.
Yula (ユラ, Yura)
The main antagonist of the series along side with the Servile God. He was one of the ruler-class phrases and the mastermind behind the Phrase invasion that plagued the multiverse. He originally sought the power of the Sovereign, but eventually discovered an even higher power. Yula also learned that the only person stands in the way of his power hungry goals is his newfound nemesis Touya. He met the Servile God, who escaped into the dimensional gap to hide from the other gods. He is subsequently tricked into thinking the Servile God is actually a very powerful God and subsequently betrayed the NEET God by having the evil god consume his body. Yula sets up a plot to trap Touya while simultaneously launching a massive invasion campaign, but this eventually fails. After the fall of the evil god, he is located and summarily executed by Melle.
Gila
A battle-crazed member of the Combat Strain of Dominant Constructs who also sought to take the Sovereign's power for his own. He invades the capital city of Xenoskull with an army of Phrase to ultimately kill Touya and Sakura, but was defeated and killed.
Xeno
A former general of the Phrase and member of the Combat Strain. He is the elder brother of Gila. He joined Yula not because he wanted the Sovereign's power; he simply wanted to kill the Sovereign for the adrenaline rush. He was killed in action by Melle.
Leto and Luto
Twin Dominant Constructs who joined Yula's faction to seek out the Sovereign.
The Servile God/NEET God
The secondary antagonist of the series. He is a rogue, lower-ranking, humanoid deity from the Divine Realm. He is lazy, arrogant, and fled to the mortal world because he was unhappy with his minor status in the Pantheon. He joined Yula to take over or destroy Touya's world, until he was subsequently betrayed by Yula by allowing the wicked god to devour him, which caused the evil deity to gain a massive power boost, equaling both as the biggest threat to Touya and himself during the climatic battle and was eventually destroyed alongside with Yula for good by Melle.
Lain Netherland (レイン・ネザーランド, Rein Nezārando)
She used to be a knight of the Kingdom of Mismede before becoming the commander of the knight order of Brunhild.
Nore Siberia (ノルエ・シベリア, Norue Shiberia)
A former soldier of the Kingdom of Mismede, the younger sister of Garn, and a commanding officer in the Mismedian Guard. She later becomes one of the Vice-Commanders of the Brunhild Knight Order along with Nikola Strand. Her original name is Norn Siberia (ノルエ・シベリア, Norun Shiberia).
Nikola Strand (ニコラ・ストランド, Nikora Suturando)
A fox beast-man who is the nephew of Olba and a former soldier for Kingdom of Mismede. He eventually becomes one of the Vice-Commanders of the Brunhild Knight Order along with Nore Siberia.
Mr. Mittens (ニャンタロー, Nyantarō)
A cat sìth and contracted cat beast of Sakura. His prefer name is D'Artagnan (ダルタニャン, Darutanyan); however, most people call him by the first name that Touya already picked, much to his chagrin, while Sakura called him by the second name Touya suggested.
Pam (パム, Pamu)
A tan-skinned and well-endowed Rauli tribeswoman from the Great Sea of Trees who met Touya and his fiancees in the village where the Spider Phrase attacked, After the battle, Pam was impressed with Touya's actions as a strong warrior and bite his neck as a sign of oath that he belongs to her. Pam once came over to Brunhild in attempted to try to bear a powerful child with Touya to strengthened her tribe for the sake of winning the Pruning Ceremony rather than joining in Touya's harem as a wife and mistress. She is now the chief of the tree nation. Despite keeping her promise to give up Touya after winning the Pruning Ceremony, Pam still wants to have his child one way or another. In the prior series, she follows Touya's good advice on gender equalities by splitting pruning according to gender.
Ripple (リップル, Rippuru)
A living picture frame artifact created by Dr. Babylon that can take on the appearance of any paintings; she take their form and manifest in the physical world. She formerly lived in an abandoned castle in Regulus and is mistaken for a ghost or a mistress, before Touya found her and brought her to live in his new country as a sort of magic security surveillance through numerous copies of picture frames created by High Rosetta set up through the castle.
Fiana Forneus (フィアナ・フォルネウス, Fiana Foruneusu)
She was the former lover of the Overlord of Xenoahs and Sakura's mother. In the prior series, Touya was helping Sakura restoring her memories. Thanks to her long lost bodyguard Spica Frennel and her used her null magic recall, Sakura decided to return to the Demon Kingdom with Touya and Spica to be reunited with her beloved mother. Afterwards, Fiana moved to Brunhild to become its school's principal alongside her beloved daughter as the teacher. She's fond of Mr. Mittens and allows his subordinate stray cats to hang out on school grounds, but she's still a well-adjusted woman and an absolute master at invoking this to stop children from misbehaving. She's not above using it on her former lover either.
Spica Frennel (スピカ・フレネル, Supika Fureneru)
A Dark Elf from a noble family in Xenoahs, who joined Brunhild's knight order after Touya cured her of a terrible illness called Demoderma. In the prior series, she was revealed to be Sakura's personal bodyguard during her time in the Demon Kingdom of Xenoahs. She places herself into exile when Sakura, formally known as Farnese Forneus, was thought to have been killed by the assassins from Yulong Heavenly Kingdom sent by her treacherous uncle Severus Arnos, but later resumes her duties and used her null magic recall to restore Sakura's memories when she was discovered to be alive in the Brunhild Dukedom thanks to her singing voice, which Spica easily recognized during the Brunhild Festival.
Severus Arnos
Sakura's evil stepuncle on her deceased stepmother's side, who hired Yulong assassins to kill his stepniece so he can get nephew stand in line of the throne. She was thought to have been killed, but she survived by teleporting away and was found and healed by Touya. Once Severus was found out by Touya and Sakura's father Zelgadi von Xenoahs, he was placed under arrest for conspiracy.

=== Other locations ===
Roadmare Union
A country that is composed of seven provinces, each of which is ruled by an elected governor, while the country itself is ruled by a doge that is chosen from among the seven governors. In the future, this country becomes a republic called Republic of Roadmare. 300 years later long after the Yulong Heavenly Empire was destroyed by the second Phrase Invasion, Roadmare Union has claimed on quarter of the Yulong Remnants for territorial expansion.
Kingdom of Felsen
This country was the most magically advanced country currently in existence. It is actively researching obsolete sorcery such as artifacts, ancient magic research, engraving sorcery, talisman arts, enchanting sorcery, beast faith sorcery, and ninjutsu. It is also responsible for producing 60% of the magically enhanced weapons and armor that exist, but the success rate is low. Long after the Yulong Heavenly Empire was destroyed by the second Phrase Invasion, their territory expand 300 years later, leaving center parts of the Yulong Remnants as the monster-infested wastelands.
Demon Kingdom of Xenoahs
A kingdom that is comprised mostly (if not completely) of demon folks. The country is bordered by both the Yulong Heavenly Empire and the Nokia Kingdom to the south. This is Sakura's hometown. Later in 300 years, the Demon Kingdom expand further south to expand their territory in the Yulong Remnants along with other surrounding kingdoms, leaving only the center parts as it became a monster-infested wasteland.
Kingdom of Hannock
A country that is bordered by the Yulong Remnants (formerly the Yulong Heavenly Empire) to the east and is adjacent to both the Kingdom of Elfrau and the Regulus Empire to the west by crossing the river. They had troubles with the Yulong Heavenly Empire until the second Phrase Invasion destroyed the rival country, leaving Hannock to expand its territory in 300 years time while the remaining part of the Yulong Remnant as a monster-infested wastelands.
Kingdom of Egret
A kingdom that is to the southwest of the main continent and directly to the west of the Great Sea of Trees. The kingdom is divided into two separate islands: the larger of the two, Egrand, and the smaller, Mallet. Its people are descended from migrants from the Great Sea of Trees, and their culture and architecture bear similarity to that of historical Mayan/Mesoamerican peoples.
Kingdom of Ryle
A country that has a relatively high population of dwarves, and its king and much of the royal family have dwarven blood. The kingdom's dwarves are particularly skilled in metal working and engineering.
Kingdom of Palouf
A kingdom located on the northern half of the Island of Palnea, which is the largest island in the west. The country almost got into a war with Lihnea, but this was prevented by Touya.
Kingdom of Elfrau
This kingdom was founded 1200 years before the start of the story. The land where the kingdom resides was originally unfit for people to live in, but thanks to the efforts of an adventurer named El Carterede and a displaced group known as the Frau Clan, it was reclaimed. El Carterede would later become the first (and possibly only) King of Elfrau marrying the current (and only) queen in the process.
Kingdom of Palerius
It is an island nation to the north of Xenoahs and Elfrau. The country is composed of four separate cities set in a different part of the island (north, south, east, and west) and a large temple located at the center of the island.
Yulong Heavenly Empire
A kingdom which continued to exist after the first Phrase invasion. This empire is known to conquer other regions due to its residents being wicked people. The assassins who tried to kill Sakura are revealed to have come from here. They even once tried to steal Touya's technology, but he foils their plans before the second Phrase Invasion, which resulted in the empire's collapse. What's left of it became known as the Yulong Remnants. Afterwards, A former adventurer turned thief named Chieh Xiaofah appears in Yulong as a fake heavenly emperor trying rebuilt the country with the help of the secret society called the Golden Order and their Iron Machine Soldiers which were made from stolen damaged Frame Gears parts, Luckily, Touya put an end to this treachery and war leaving the country in ruins once again. Eventually, in 300 years time, most of its remnants have been claimed by a few neighboring kingdoms for territorial expansions while one remaining part of the Remnant claimed by the monster-infestation.
Great Sea of Trees
A major location found between Mismede and Sandora run by various warror tribes.
Kingdom of Horn
A country located on the east border of the Magic Kingdom of Felsen and the south of Yulong. After the fall of the Yulong Heavenly Empire, the small Kingdom of Horn expanded and claimed a quarter of the Yulong Remnants 300 years later.
Kingdom of Nokia
A mountainous country reminiscent of Tibet. Sharing borders only with Yulong and Xenoahs to its West and Northwest, the country has historically been diplomatically isolated and has repelled many invasions from Yulong. 300 years later after its rival country's fall, the Nokia Kingdom expanded and claim the Yulong Remnants.

=== Creatures ===
Kohaku (琥珀, Kohaku)
Voiced by: Yuki Kaida (Japanese); Marissa Lenti (English)
Formerly known as The White Monarch (白帝, Byakutei). She is a companion and a contracted beast of Touya on his journey. She is one of the Four Heavenly Beasts and also the leader of the Magical Beasts. She can change between a fearsome large tiger to a gentle tiger cub.
Kokuyou (黒曜, Kokuyou) and Sango (珊瑚, Sango)
Voiced by: Issei Futamata and Naoko Matsui (Japanese); Jerry Jewell (Kokuyou), Elizabeth Maxwell (Sango) (English)
Formerly known as The Black Monarch (玄帝, Gentei). They are companions and contracted beasts of Touya on his journey. They are both parts of the Genbu. They are one of the Four Heavenly Beasts and also the leader of the Scaled Creatures. Like Kohaku, they can change from their more giant monstrous form into their small less harmless chibi snake and turtle form.
Kougyoku (紅玉, Kōgyoku)
Voiced by: Houko Kuwashima (Japanese); TBA (English)
Formerly known as The Flame Monarch (炎帝, Entei). She is a companion and contracted beast of Touya on his journey. She is one of the Four Heavenly Beasts and also the leader of the birds. She can change from her large majestic phoenix form to her chibi tiny bird form.
Luli (瑠璃, Ruri)
Formerly known as The Azure Monarch (蒼帝, Soutei) is a companion and contracted beast of Touya on his journey. She is one of the Four Heavenly Beasts and also the leader of the Dragons. Like her fellow Heavenly Beasts, She can also change from her giant magnificent dragon form to her small baby dragon form. She is also shown to have a difficult relationship with Kohaku due to their opposing personalities.
Phrases (フレイズ, Fureizu)
Evil crystal creature who once attacked the kingdoms in the past, but their attack was mysterious stopped. They later return in the present to search for their ruler, whose core is inside someone; however, they must eliminate any humans and demi-humans that they encounter because their heartbeats make it hard for them to track the core. Due to their thick armor, they can only be killed by destroying their power cores. Another way to defeat them is with weapons that are made from the same material as their armor.
