= The Executioner and Her Way of Life =

2020s light novel series

- First light novel volume cover, featuring Menou

処刑少女の生きる道(バージンロード) (Shokei Shōjo no Bājin Rōdo)
- Genre: Adventure; Isekai; Yuri
- Light novel
- Written by: Mato Sato
- Illustrated by: Nilitsu
- Published by: SB Creative
- English publisher: NA: Yen Press
- Imprint: GA Bunko
- Original run: July 12, 2019 – March 15, 2025
- Volumes: 11
- Manga
- Written by: Mato Sato
- Illustrated by: Ryō Mitsuya
- Published by: Square Enix
- English publisher: NA: Yen Press
- Magazine: Young Gangan
- Original run: June 5, 2020 – April 19, 2024
- Volumes: 7
- Anime television series
- Directed by: Yoshiki Kawasaki
- Written by: Shōgo Yasukawa
- Music by: Michiru
- Studio: J.C.Staff
- Licensed by: Sentai Filmworks: SA/SEA: Medialink
- Original network: Tokyo MX, BS11, AT-X
- Original run: April 2, 2022 – June 18, 2022
- Episodes: 12
- icon

The Executioner and Her Way of Life (Japanese: 処刑少女の生きる道(バージンロード), Hepburn: Shokei Shōjo no Bājin Rōdo; lit. 'The Executioner Girl's Virgin Road' (Note: The kanji 生きる道 are normally read as ikiru michi ("way of life"); however, in the title they are glossed using ruby characters with the furigana バージンロード (bājin rōdo, lit. 'virgin road'). The latter phrase is a Japanese term for a wedding aisle.)) is a Japanese light novel series written by Mato Sato and illustrated by Nilitsu. SB Creative released eleven volumes from July 2019 to March 2025 under its GA Bunko imprint. The series follows Akari, a girl summoned from Japan to another realm who gains the power to control time, and Menou, a young priestess tasked with killing Akari to protect her own world.

A manga adaptation with art by Ryō Mitsuya was serialized in Square Enix's seinen manga magazine Young Gangan from June 2020 to April 2024, with its chapters collected in seven tankōbon volumes. Both the light novel and manga are licensed in North America by Yen Press. A 12-episode anime television series adaptation by J.C.Staff aired between April and June 2022.

Sato wrote The Executioner and Her Way of Life after deciding to create a story he described as harsh and merciless, using its darker style as a way to challenge himself creatively. He drew inspiration from a wide variety of existing works, such as the anime series Darker than Black, while also deliberately subverting isekai conventions. The subsequent manga and anime adaptations were created with an emphasis on the pacing and visuals of their respective mediums, as well as fidelity to the original work.

The debut light novel volume won a Grand Prize at the 2018 GA Bunko Awards, and by January 2024, the series had over 400,000 copies in circulation. The light novels and manga have been well received by critics, particularly for their characters, worldbuilding, and approach to the isekai genre. The anime adaptation has also received favorable reviews, with praise for its story and pacing, and was named by several publications as being among the best anime of 2022.

== Synopsis ==
In a world parallel to Earth, people built an advanced civilization by summoning Japanese individuals, known as Lost Ones, with powerful abilities called Pure Concepts. However, these Lost Ones eventually lost control of their Pure Concepts, leading to calamity. A thousand years ago, four Lost Ones devastated the world and rendered much of it uninhabitable.

In response, the summoning of Lost Ones has been outlawed by the Church. Among the Church's servants are Executioners, who are secretly tasked to assassinate any Lost Ones who appear. One of these Executioners, Menou, is ordered to eliminate Akari Tokitou, a Lost One summoned by King Grisarika. When her attempt fails, she discovers that Akari possesses the Pure Concept of Time, which allows her to reverse her own death.

Pretending to escort Akari home, Menou sets out on a journey with her across the land while searching for a way to kill her. Along the way, the two face threats from monsters, criminals, and even the Church itself. Meanwhile, as Menou becomes closer with the kind and innocent Akari, she struggles with conflicted feelings about her mission.

== Characters ==
Menou (メノウ, Menō)
Voiced by: Iori Saeki (Japanese); Annie Wild, Brittney Karbowski (young) (English)
A young priestess who assassinates Lost Ones before their Pure Concepts become a threat. She knows that most of the Lost Ones she kills are innocent, but her training dictates that they cannot be allowed to live. After failing to execute Akari, Menou acts as her escort while searching for a way to kill her.
As a child, Menou was the sole survivor of an accident involving a Lost One. The disaster left her soul "bleached" and wiped away her memories and desires. She was discovered by Flare, a top Executioner, and taken on as an apprentice. Menou possesses strong control over her magical Guiding Force (Note: Referred to as "ether" in the anime adaptation.) and wields a knife and enchanted scripture.
Akari Tokitou (時任 アカリ, Tokitō Akari)
Voiced by: Moe Kahara (Japanese); Melissa Molano (English)
A Japanese high school student summoned to the world by King Grisarika. Her Pure Concept, "Time", gives her the ability to manipulate time, allowing her to instinctively reverse her death. She is naive but kind and innocent, leading her to easily trust Menou out of a belief that their encounter is fate. In truth, Akari has already made the world regress multiple times to prevent Menou's death, erasing her own memories each time and leaving only a deep love for Menou.
Momo (モモ)
Voiced by: Hisako Kanemoto (Japanese); Cat Thomas, Holly Segarra (young) (English)
A young priestess and Menou's aide. Momo has been in love with Menou ever since they became childhood friends. She grows jealous of Akari as she becomes closer with Menou. She wields a wire saw and prefers to fight physically.
Ashuna (アーシュナ, Āshuna)
Voiced by: M.A.O (Japanese); Rachael Messer (English)
A warrior princess from the Grisarika kingdom. Rash and bold, Ashuna has little regard for noble duties and prefers to seek out strong opponents to battle. Though she dislikes the Church, she is willing to work with Menou and Momo against common enemies. She fights using a greatsword enchanted with flames.
Flare (フレア, Furea)
Voiced by: Yūko Kaida (Japanese); Molly Searcy (English)
A legendary and ruthless Executioner famed for her incredible skill in magecraft and for killing many Lost Ones. After saving a young Menou from a Lost One, Flare took her in as an apprentice. She has the ability to remember past iterations of the world created by Akari's power and is responsible for killing Menou and Akari if Menou fails to follow through on her mission.
Orwell (オーウェル, Ōweru)
Voiced by: Tamie Kubota (Japanese); Shelley Calene-Black (English)
The Archbishop of the Church and Menou's direct superior. She orders Menou to bring Akari to be executed. Menou later discovers that Orwell, having grown disillusioned from her years of service, has been kidnapping young girls to drain their youth and intends to use Akari to reverse time on herself. Her plan fails after Menou uses Akari's Pure Concept to age Orwell to death.
Mitsuki (ミツキ)
Voiced by: Yuma Uchida (Japanese); Bryson Baugus (English)
A Japanese high school student summoned to the world with Akari by King Grisarika. His Pure Concept is "Null", which allows him to destroy any object. He is killed by Menou to prevent him from abusing his power.
Manon Libelle (マノン リベル, Manon Riberu)
Voiced by: Manaka Iwami (Japanese); Kristen McGuire (English)
The daughter of Count Libelle, her father, and a Lost One, her mother. Because she never inherited her mother's powers, people often scorned her, and she began seeking death after her mother was killed by Flare. She leads a subversive group called The Fourth, who aim to tear down the world's class system. While seemingly mild-mannered, she has a penchant for sadistic murder. She is Pandemonium's older sister, though Pandemonium arrived in the world long before her.
Pandemonium (パンデモニウム, Pandemoniumu)
Voiced by: Anzu Haruno (Japanese); Juliet Simmons (English)
A Lost One that came to this world one thousand years ago. She appears like a ten-year-old child. Her Pure Concept is "Evil", (Note: Referred to as "Chaos" in the anime adaptation.) allowing her to summon monsters. After losing control of her powers, she became one of the disasters known as the Four Major Human Errors. Having completely lost her sense of self, she wants only to spread chaos. She is Manon's younger sister despite having arrived before her in this world.
Sicilia (シシリア, Shishiria)
Voiced by: Akeno Watanabe (Japanese); Courtney Lomelo (English)
A priestess in the city of Libelle who manages the local church. She is initially unfriendly towards Menou, having encountered her mentor Flare in the past, but eventually grows to respect her.
Sahara (サハラ, Sahara)
A nun who encounters Menou on her journey. She has known Menou since childhood. Though she betrays Menou out of jealousy for Menou's apprenticeship under Flare, she eventually changes her mind and reluctantly helps her.

== Production ==
=== Light novels ===
==== Development ====
Sato had published two series prior to writing The Executioner and Her Way of Life. He cited Tomihiko Morimi as an influence on his approach to engaging storytelling, as well Kaho Nashiki as an inspiration to creating his stories' atmosphere. Watching the anime series Darker than Black led him to explore a new genre as a personal challenge.

The initial idea for the series came from Sato's desire to write a harsh and merciless story. However, he avoided placing characters in "tragic positions" solely because of this, and instead developed the narrative with conflict he believed they could overcome. In particular, he used the story's dark setting to force Menou, the protagonist, to face conflict and grow as a character. Sato sought to depict characters as incomplete individuals who changed over time, and identified a central theme as being able to accept oneself despite having committed unforgivable acts.

The evolution of magic systems in light novels served as a basis for the story's magic system. Sato explained that early series like Slayers and Sorcerous Stabber Orphen featured spoken spells, whereas more recent works had shifted towards faster-paced incantations. He combined these two elements, later describing his design as "modern steampunk [constructed] in a magical way".

Although the novels draw on established conventions of isekai stories (a genre where characters are transported to another world), Sato aimed to subvert the genre by incorporating his own original elements. In addition, several of the story's aspects were chosen to challenge himself and improve his writing. For instance, he had no prior experience with darker subject matter, but included such themes anyway to "step up as an author". He also included extensive worldbuilding and fight sequences, two other areas in which he had minimal experience. He called the story a "stylish spy action fantasy" with chūnibyō and steampunk elements, which he explained was a "mash-up of [his] interests".

Sato began writing by visualizing several crucial moments, then developing the rest of the plot around them. The first scene that he created was the story's opening sequence in which Menou kills a Lost One, while the second was one where Menou and Akari had an argument. He said that he "had to come up with a story that would let [him] include both these scenes". From there, he focused on deciding each character's role within the plot and developing their personalities and backgrounds. For subsequent volumes, he adopted a more flexible approach; in an afterword to the second book, he remarked that he seemed to "never know the characters' futures until they happen".

===== Characters =====
Sato believed that the inclusion of a male protagonist would create expectations of heterosexual romance, which he wanted to avoid. By focusing on an all-female main cast, he sought to portray their relationships with greater emotional depth and depict their lives and struggles.

Sato developed the principal characters with an emphasis on clearly defined motivations. Menou was conceived as a character faithful to her duties yet burdened by them. Although she holds herself to strict standards, Sato described her as comparatively lenient with others and a "strong and determined" person. He focused the narrative around her perspective, calling the story a "world with Menou at the center even as it threatens to leave her behind". He felt that Menou was a fragile character, which allowed her to change and grow. To this end, he portrayed Akari with an emphasis on her unconditional kindness towards Menou, which gradually starts to affect her. He cited Akari's lack of self-awareness about her own flaws as one of her most endearing traits.

For the supporting cast, Sato took a differing approach but still strived to portray each character as a fully realized individual. He initially wrote Momo as a simple character but gradually revealed the complexities of her personality, particularly through the use of flashbacks. Sato described her as his favorite character and one he especially enjoyed writing. In contrast, Ashuna was characterized more consistently as a strong and honest individual who becomes involved with the other protagonists against common enemies. Sato considered her distinctive for her personality's constancy.

==== Release ====
"I wanted to take a step forward. I wanted to incorporate elements I hadn't included in my previous work—things like more realistic combat scenes and worldbuilding—and write an even better novel. I wanted to start something new. Having a work completed with those desires receive an award like this has been tremendously encouraging."

— Mato Sato, interview with Da Vinci (translated), explaining why he submitted his work to the GA Bunko contest

Sato enjoyed reading web novels and intended the initial volume to follow their "momentum". However, he released his work as a light novel out of a desire to create a "single epic story", rather than relying on "real-time developments" to maintain reader interest.

Sato remarked that the writing process was not difficult, with the first volume taking just two months to write. He submitted the manuscript to the 2018 GA Bunko Awards, a contest hosted by the publishing company SB Creative. To his surprise, he secured publication by winning the Grand Prize, the first time in seven years that it had been awarded. Although he initially planned on a bimonthly release schedule, he decided on a slower pace for subsequent volumes.

The light novels are illustrated by Nilitsu, who contributed to the setting's visuals and assisted with character designs. Sato was pleased by the final illustrations, which he felt effectively conveyed the characters' personalities and emotions.

=== Manga ===
Ryō Mitsuya, the artist for the manga adaptation, described adapting an existing work as a difficult process. Although the plot was already established, they (Note: Mitsuya has not publicly revealed their gender.) found it challenging to adapt the story into a form that would please different audience sectors. In particular, they noted that while they disliked fan service, it would appeal to parts of the magazine's readership.

To begin the adaptation, Mitsuya read the light novels and identified ideal points at which to divide the story for serialization, as well as particularly interesting scenes. From there, they focused on balancing the narrative to build tension and concluding chapters with cliffhangers whenever possible. According to Mitsuya, achieving proper pacing required frequent cutting and rearrangement of material. In an afterword to the sixth volume, they added that the fast pace of the adaptation required omitting several of the light novels' interludes.

Mitsuya emphasized the characters' visual portrayal, stating that they wanted to "draw lots of interactions and expressions that do them justice". They described becoming "invested" emotionally in the story and wrote that they "hope[d] my art conveys all of [the characters'] charm to the reader too". While smaller details like background art and coloring were typically left to assistants, Mitsuya sometimes completed entire scenes personally. Because visual detail plays a central role in manga, they considered the art comparable in importance to the plot itself.

After completing each chapter draft, Mitsuya would consult with both an editor and Sato for revision prior to publication. Sato wrote short stories and afterwords for the manga, while Nilitsu contributed original illustrations at the end of each volume. During the production of the anime adaptation, Mitsuya visited the recording studio to observe the voice actors' performances.

=== Anime ===
==== Adaptation ====
Sato worked closely with the director, Yoshiki Kawasaki, and writer, Shōgo Yasukawa, of the anime adaptation. He attended every script meeting to determine which parts of the original work were most essential to adapt. Yasukawa stated that Sato's "diligence" allowed the studio to "do justice" to the original work. Kawasaki likewise praised Sato's collaboration, explaining that Sato was flexible when changes were required and open to explaining his work. Sato himself was pleased by the adaptation, announcing that his "heart [was] full of gratitude and excitement" for the coming series. He spoke positively of the working environment, stating that it was easy to express his opinions.

Kawasaki aimed to convey the overarching emotions of the original novels while prioritizing unusual moments that embodied the "author's soul". To this end, Kawasaki's main directorial priorities were showing the characters' feelings and telling the story clearly, with particular focus on Menou's deepening relationship with Akari. Meanwhile, Yasukawa described Momo as his favorite character to write due to her energetic personality. He stated that the pairings between characters were a major part of the story, with the "quirks" of each pairing often giving rise to especially "entertaining dialogue". Alongside this, Kawasaki worked to create a "weird and appealing setting" that supported the central drama. Kawasaki mentioned the challenge of balancing humorous moments with more serious ones and remarked that he was only satisfied after considerable trial and error.

The adaptation required careful planning of the plot structure. Kawasaki initially focused on creating a memorable premiere by pairing what he saw as the strength of the original premise with expressive animation. Later episodes were written to stay faithful to the source material, particularly its focus on Menou's perspective. Producer Nobuhiro Ōsawa described episodes 1–6 as being like a prologue, with the second half of the series increasing in both narrative and visual complexity. Yasukawa remarked that while he found the ending of the first volume "cathartic", it was an "enormous pressure" to depict onscreen.

The project marked Kawasaki's first time as a director. He was initially apprehensive, since his storyboarding and direction for the first episode would set the foundation for the entire series. He was also concerned about whether the anime would appeal to a wide audience while pleasing the production committee, staff, and original author. Since it was his directorial debut, he decided to take creative risks, such as including animation techniques that would normally be considered overly labor-intensive. Ōsawa later stated that such risks were necessary for first-time directors and ultimately worked out for the first episode.

==== Animation ====
Kawasaki used animation as a means of characterization; in contrast to traditional animation techniques, which portray highly stylized facial features, he incorporated realistic expressions to depict a wider emotional range, particularly as the story progressed. Though he noted that it was different than what the studio's animation team normally worked on, he felt that a novel approach would be enjoyable for both them and the viewers.

For action sequences, Kawasaki gave the animation team considerable creative freedom, believing that visual execution would be more impactful than detailed directorial choices. One noteworthy exception was a request that the animators incorporate stylistic influences from Western cinema; he cited the movie Once Upon a Time in the West as an inspiration for a scene set in a ruined town, as well as aspects of Flare's character design. In addition, Flare's outfit was modeled on the poncho that Clint Eastwood would wear in his Spaghetti Western films.

The animation of the magic system, which was noted as a challenge for the adaptation, used a "sci-fi" style.

The series's visual settings drew on a wide range of influences. Kawasaki modeled technological designs on elements of Art Deco aesthetics and incorporated motifs inspired by the late 19th and early 20th centuries. Although he planned to feature prominent Japanese signage, the idea was scaled back at the request of what he described as "surprisingly conservative" producers.

One of the adaptation's primary challenges was the visual portrayal of the story's magic system. After consulting with Sato, Kawasaki opted to preserve the rapid incantation style of the novels while emphasizing aesthetic appeal. He compared the final result to computer code rendered with a "sci-fi angle". Another challenge mentioned by Yasukawa was depicting scenes set in the past. Because these moments were central to the narrative, he had to consult extensively with Kawasaki to portray them well.

==== Voice acting ====
Iori Saeki, the voice actress for Menou, found her part challenging due to her character's emotional ambiguity. Kawasaki gave her considerable freedom in interpreting her role, so she focused on conveying her feelings as naturally as possible throughout the narrative. Moe Kahara, who voiced Akari, also emphasized her character's ambiguity, such as through the emotional expression of scenes that hinted at Akari's secrets and backstory. In an interview where the two discussed their impressions of the light novels, Kahara described the frequent plot twists as being a core element, whereas Saeki was more interested in the interactions between characters. Both Saeki and Kahara stated that they wanted their performances to respect the original work.

Hisako Kanemoto and M·A·O, who voiced Momo and Ashuna, respectively, portrayed a secondary character pairing. Because their characters frequently appeared together, their actresses focused on making their interactions engaging, depicting the two becoming closer despite their initially hostile encounter. Kanemoto adjusted her tone and vocal register depending on Momo's degree of friendliness with the other lead characters, using this variation as a means of characterization.

Several other voice actors gave brief insights into their characters. Manaka Iwami, who voiced Manon, described her character as having a gentle demeanor; she focused on conveying darker and more hidden aspects of her personality. Similarly, Yūko Kaida, the voice of Flare, felt that her character's exterior masked deep loneliness, which she tried to express despite finding her role initially difficult. Tamie Kubota, Orwell's voice actor, commented on the originality of the series, stating that she was repeatedly surprised by each episode's script. She decided to portray Orwell with distinct and often contradictory traits like kindness and bitterness.

==== Soundtrack ====
External music videos
- "Paper Bouquet" performed by Mili
- "Tomoshibi Serenade" performed by ChouCho

While planning the opening theme, "Paper Bouquet" by Mili, Kawasaki sought to avoid an "utterly banal 'correct anime opening'" and instead focus on symbolic expression. In particular, a scene that he highlighted as "ridiculously 'incorrect'" compared to a typical anime visual was one where Akari reverses time on Menou's body to bring her back to life, intended to represent Akari's repeated rewinding of the world to save her. He also aimed to synchronize animation with the music, such as by "showing off" dynamic visuals timed to the start of the chorus. Cassie Wei, Mili's lead vocalist, characterized the song's mood as one of "fortitude, intensity, and [...] poignancy".

ChouCho, who composed the ending theme, "Tomoshibi Serenade" (Serenade by Lamplight), based her music off the atmosphere of the original work. She aimed to convey the story's dark tone while maintaining a delicate sound. At the studio's request, she kept the lyrics ambiguous so that they could be interpreted from either Menou's or Akari's perspective. ChouCho described the lyrics as being emotionally intense despite their restrained expression.

In his portrayal of Ashuna, Kawasaki drew inspiration from the dark heroes of Japanese period dramas such as Hissatsu Shigotonin and Ōedo Sōsamō. He asked the music composer, Michiru, to evoke the mood of these heroes in Ashuna's background music. Kawasaki was pleased by the final result, which featured stylized elements such as a flamenco guitar motif.

== Themes and analysis ==
=== Isekai ===
The Executioner and Her Way of Life is part of the isekai genre, which involves a character being transported to a different world. In Exploring Isekai, Travis Nishii argues that the story critiques colonial assumptions embedded in many isekai narratives. He notes that Japanese traditions and customs from Lost Ones have supplanted those of Menou's own world, effectively erasing its original culture; this is especially reflected in the setting, which features extensive Japanese architecture and the absence of native ones. Thus, he suggests that the anime's visuals constantly reminds the viewer of the "contemporary postcolonial anxiety of total and complete cultural loss and assimilation by a colonial power."

=== Gender ===
Nishii notes that the main characters of Executioner are all female, which he suggests is a reversal of typical gendered power dynamics. In comparison to the male gaze, he contends that the series' gaze is "lesbian, for women, and made by women." Together with the seemingly contemporary Japanese style of the setting, Nishii argues that Executioner portrays an idealized modern society with "visibly queer" relationships.

== Media ==
=== Light novels ===
After Sato won the Grand Prize at the 2018 GA Bunko Awards for the first light novel's manuscript, SB Creative released the debut volume in July 2019 under its GA Bunko imprint. SB Creative published eleven light novel volumes in total, ending with the simultaneous release of the final two volumes in March 2025. The light novels are licensed in North America by Yen Press, and an English-language release was announced in September 2020. As of June 2026, ten English-language volumes have been released.

Yen Press published an audiobook version of the first light novel volume under its Yen Audio imprint on December 12, 2023. The audiobooks subsequently covered up to the eighth volume of the series and are narrated by Annie Wild, the English voice actor for Menou.

=== Manga ===
A manga adaptation was serialized in Square Enix's Young Gangan magazine from June 5, 2020, to April 19, 2024. Square Enix published the first tankōbon volume of the series on February 9, 2021; the seventh and final volume was released on September 25, 2024. On September 24, 2025, Square Enix began publishing English chapters of the manga on its Manga Up! service. The manga is licensed in North America by Yen Press. On December 30, 2025, the last of the seven volumes was released in English.

=== Anime ===
An anime television series adaptation of the light novels was announced on January 31, 2021. The series is animated by J.C.Staff and directed by Yoshiki Kawasaki, making his directorial debut, with Shōgo Yasukawa supervising scripts, Keiko Tamaki designing characters, and Michiru composing music. Egg Firm and SB Creative produced the series.

The series aired from April 2 to June 18, 2022, on Tokyo MX, BS11, and AT-X. (Note: Tokyo MX lists the series premiere at 24:30 on April 1, 2022, which is effectively 12:30 a.m. JST on April 2.) The first six episodes cover the first volume of the light novels, while the last six cover the second one. The opening theme song is "Paper Bouquet" by Mili, and the ending theme song is "Tomoshibi Serenade" (Serenade by Lamplight) by ChouCho.

Sentai Filmworks licensed the series outside of Asia on Hidive. An English dub of the series premiered on Hidive on May 20, 2022. Medialink licensed the series in Southeast Asia, South Asia, and Oceania (minus Australia and New Zealand).

On August 31, 2022, a Blu-ray edition of the first part of the anime was released, featuring episodes 1–6 of the anime, episodes 1–9 of the radio program, art by Nilitsu, a special character booklet, and an original short story by Sato. On September 28, 2022, a Blu-ray edition of the second part of the anime was released, featuring episodes 7–12 of the anime, episodes 10–16 of the radio program, and similar bonuses to the first edition, including another short story by Sato.

=== Other media ===
A 12-episode internet radio program to promote the show aired on Onsen Internet Radio Station from January 28 to July 1, 2022. It was hosted by Iori Saeki and Moe Kahara, who played Menou and Akari, respectively, and featured guest appearances by Hisako Kanemoto (Momo), Yuko Kaida (Flare), Tamie Kubota (Orwell), M·A·O (Ashuna), Manaka Iwami (Manon), Anzu Haruno (Pandemonium), and ChouCho (singer and lyricist of the ending theme).

A crossover event between the series and the game Is It Wrong to Try to Pick Up Girls in a Dungeon? Infinite Combate was held from April 22 to May 6, 2022, featuring Momo as a playable character. Another crossover event, between the franchise and the online game Girls & Creatures, was held from June 23 to July 7, 2022, featuring the four main characters as heroes and Manon as a boss.

On March 14, 2025, GA Bunko released an art book by Nilitsu with illustrations from the light novels. It included several original drawings and a short story by Sato.

== Reception ==
=== Light novels ===
==== Sales ====
By February 2022, the series had over 300,000 copies in circulation. By January 2024, the series had over 400,000 copies in circulation. BookWalker, a Japanese e-book platform, reported that the series ranked 25th on its list of most-downloaded light novels in 2022.

==== Accolades ====
The debut volume won a Grand Prize at the 2018 GA Bunko Awards, becoming the first work to win one in seven years. The judge review described it as creative, with particular praise for the pacing and balance of the narrative.

In 2020, the series was awarded seventh place at the Light Novel Lover Bookseller Awards, an event in which bookstore clerks across Japan voted for their favorite light novels. Two selected reviews spoke positively of the emotional themes and story's pacing, while the last review opined that the story filled in a perspective missing from traditional isekai works.

==== Critical reception ====
The premise of the work and its approach to the isekai genre were commended by several reviewers. Anthony Gramuglia of CBR praised the first volume, calling it "required reading" for fans of isekai. He surmised that it would also appeal to readers less interested in the genre due to its "distinctive" nature that subverted typical conventions. Similarly, Demelza of UK Anime News voiced her enjoyment of the "fresh take" of the first novel, scoring it a 9/10 and concluding it offered "plenty to keep readers invested".

The worldbuilding was generally well received. Sean Gaffney of Manga Bookshelf described the magic system as "fantastic", "well thought-out", and "integrat[ing] nicely with the world's religion". Erica Friedman of Okazu was similarly impressed, calling the worldbuilding "deeply unusual" for a light novel in its detail and originality and giving the first two volumes an 8/10 rating. However, both Gaffney and Friedman were less enthused about the dark tone of the story, with Friedman feeling it was unnecessary.

Several reviewers praised the characterization of the all-female leads. Gaffney wrote that while the story featured typical archetypes, each character had significant depth. He was particularly impressed by Momo for her background and "terrific romantic epilogue". Demelza called Menou a "compelling protagonist" and opined that Akari's backstory hinted at greater depth beyond her carefree portrayal. Adam Symchuk of Asian Movie Pulse remarked that the first volume was "endearing" and "utterly adorable", praising Sato for "excel[ling] at capturing personality in every aspect". The story's yuri elements were also generally well-received, with both Friedman and Demelza opining that they had strong potential.

The pacing and balance of the plot were more divisive. Symchuk was ambivalent on the balance between humor and action, calling it "choppy at certain points", but nevertheless noted that he found the book a "joy to read". In contrast, Demelza commented positively on the continuity of the story, stating that the second volume "buil[t] on the mysteries" of the first volume while setting up "fascinating" possibilities. In a piece for Anime Corner, Brett Orr named the fifth volume as one of his top ten light novels of 2023, calling it a "high water mark" and a "climactic reveal" for the series.

=== Manga ===
==== Critical reception ====
The series's perspective on isekai was well received by several reviewers. Orr, writing for Honey's Anime, recommended the manga for its "redux" of the genre, stating that it "cut straight through the mundane mess of so-so fantasy", while Sara Smith of Graphic Library enjoyed the story's "spin" on isekai through its examination of genre conventions. A reviewer from Anime News Network (ANN) praised how "what starts out as a typical isekai [...] gets turned on its head with dramatic flair", though he expressed reservations about the later plotline, which he felt was predictable.

Regarding the cast, Orr described the story as "perfect female-led fiction" that "refused to compromise on its own ideals", noting its relative lack of fan service and its prominent yuri subplot. Jean-Karlo Lemus of ANN praised Akari's portrayal in particular, calling her a "fascinating character" set in a succinctly built world.

The pacing and narrative received generally positive reviews. Smith praised the "satisfying amount of buildup" before the intense action scenes, while Orr considered the pacing a "little slow" but nevertheless described the narrative as a "ride" that would "twist and turn" readers' emotions. Both Smith and Lemus commended the ending, with Lemus calling it a "fantastic cliffhanger". Lemus, comparing the manga to the anime adaptation, wrote that it "retained all of the charm and sharp wit", while Orr called the manga a "streamlined take" on the light novels that was able to "bring [...] the world to life".

=== Anime ===
==== Popularity ====
After the first episode aired, the series ranked first on Anime Corner's weekly audience survey, receiving 12.04% of audience votes. After the sixth episode, the midpoint of the show, the series ranked third, while after the twelfth episode, the finale, the series ranked fifth out of forty-two series in total.

In a poll conducted by Anime Corner with 26,734 participants, the show placed fifth in the "Fantasy Anime of the Year" category with 9.63% of the votes.

==== Critical reception ====
The first episode received warm reviews from several critics. Vrai Kaiser of Anime Feminist praised the balance between "slick and inventive" fighting sequences and quieter moments, emphasizing that the show avoided "empty action". Caitlin Moore and Nicholas Dupree of ANN both awarded the premiere five stars; Moore lauded the pacing's "incredible sense of balance", while Dupree commended the "compelling" conflict and concluded that the show gave "every reason to come back for more".

Reviewers frequently praised the series's character writing, particularly the complexity and chemistry of its female leads. Steve Jones of ANN described the diverse personalities of the main cast as the "real appeal" of the show, while Moore spoke positively of how the story created "complicated, varied, and messy" characters without "softening" them. Menou's characterization was particularly well-received, with Berkely Hermann of The Geekiary voicing approval of her sympathetic portrayal despite being morally ambiguous. However, some criticism was directed at Momo's personality; Kaiser felt that her antics were a "jarring swerve" that "thankfully taper[ed] off" later on.

Menou and Akari's relationship received particular acclaim; James Beckett, writing for ANN, mentioned their dynamic as an engrossing plot point with its "warped expression of genuine love", while Jones opined that their mutual secrets made their "nice, twisted" relationship "fraught, and thus all the more interesting". Several reviewers analyzed the yuri undertones between the two characters; Richard Eisenbeis of ANN praised their complex relationship and the "bittersweet note of tragedy [...] looming on the horizon", while Hermann commented positively on how the show embraced its yuri elements far more than similar series like Otherside Picnic. Dawn H. of ANN commended the show for its serious treatment of lesbian relationships, stating she was "thrilled" to see "obvious sapphic romantic plots" that "weren't being played up as jokes".

The series's originality and narrative direction were well received by critics. Hermann described it as "unlike any other" series for defying "commonly used tropes" from its opening episode; similarly, Gracie Qu of Anime Trending was enthused with the story for consistently being able to "throw a curveball". Regarding pacing, Jean-Karlo Lemus of ANN wrote that the story was "absolutely entertaining" from beginning to end, while Zeerak Ahmad of Anime Corner remarked that he found the series "fantastic" for being able to "surprise you with a great episode when you least expect it". The uniqueness of the worldbuilding was also praised; the "instantly fascinating" and "fleshed-out" world impressed Dupree, who called it a "minor miracle" for its unusual depth. Qu gave particular praise for the story's magic system, calling it "incredibly interesting", and the resulting fight scenes "exhilarating".

Similarly to the light novels and manga, the show's approach to the isekai genre was widely acclaimed. Kaiser argued that the show used genre conventions as a "springboard" for a "satisfying" narrative, while Beckett acclaimed the premise for putting a "fun twist" on "tired modern isekai tropes" and concluded that the story was "genuinely compelling". Analyzing the series as a whole, Richard Eisenbeis of ANN summarized that the show was a "fantastic deconstruction" of isekai, which "buil[t] a world" around taking typical elements to their "most logical extremes". Comparing the story to others in the genre, Lemus concluded that it was "heads and shoulders above other isekai in so many ways".

The production value received mixed-to-positive comments. Mansfield was hesitant on the animation, stating that the show had "visual storytelling prowess" but occasionally failed to deliver on its potential. Qu concurred, stating that it often "fell flat" outside of fight scenes. Conversely, Berkely acclaimed the "amazing" animation as a key production value, while Ahmad was impressed by the overall production, particularly the "excellent" cuts. The music was less divisive; Beckett named the opening theme, "Paper Bouquet", as his favorite song of the year for its "perfect fairytale vibe" and "loaded lyrics", and Mansfield commended the soundtrack as a "dark horse production value".

Following the series's conclusion, Moore chose it as the best anime of the year, citing its complex characterization of female leads, rejection of clichés, and consistently "tense" plot. Kaiser, together with three other Anime Feminist reviewers, recommended the show as one of the top three anime of 2022, explaining that it put "genuine work" into exploring sophisticated themes and was "deliciously dark". Eisenbeis named the series as the best anime of Spring 2022, calling it an "engrossing" show with a "fascinating" premise and "complex" characters. Ahmad regarded the show as the best anime of the season, citing its production value and "fantastic" progression. In 2025, the ANN editorial team selected the show as one of its favorite isekai titles of all time, mentioning its worldbuilding, character writing, and serious approach to mature themes.

== See also ==
- Is It Wrong to Try to Pick Up Girls in a Dungeon?: Familia Chronicle, another light novel series illustrated by Nilitsu
- A Certain Item of Dark Side, another light novel series illustrated by Nilitsu
