= How a Realist Hero Rebuilt the Kingdom =

Japanese light novel series and its franchise

- First light novel volume cover, featuring Liscia Elfrieden (front) and Kazuya Souma (back)

現実主義勇者の王国再建記 (Genjitsu Shugi Yūsha no Ōkoku Saikenki)
- Genre: Fantasy comedy; Harem; Isekai
- Novel series
- Written by: Dojyomaru
- Published by: Shōsetsuka ni Narō (2014–2016); Pixiv (2016–2024)
- Original run: 2014 – 2024
- Light novel
- Written by: Dojyomaru
- Illustrated by: Fuyuyuki
- Published by: Overlap
- English publisher: NA: J-Novel Club (digital); Seven Seas Entertainment (print)
- Imprint: Overlap Bunko
- Original run: May 25, 2016 – December 25, 2024
- Volumes: 20
- Manga
- Written by: Dojyomaru
- Illustrated by: Satoshi Ueda
- Published by: Overlap
- English publisher: NA: J-Novel Club
- Imprint: Gardo Comics
- Magazine: Comic Gardo
- Original run: July 10, 2017 – present
- Volumes: 15
- Anime television series
- Directed by: Takashi Watanabe
- Produced by: Yukio Kikukawa; Fumihiro Ozawa; Riko Koarai; Shouhei Yoshida; Mou Lanfeng
- Written by: Gō Zappa; Hiroshi Ōnogi
- Music by: Akiyuki Tateyama
- Studio: J.C.Staff
- Licensed by: Crunchyroll (Note: In North America through Crunchyroll, LLC (formerly known as Funimation).); SEA: Mighty Media
- Original network: Tokyo MX, BS11
- English network: SEA: Animax Asia
- Original run: July 4, 2021 – April 3, 2022
- Episodes: 26
- icon

How a Realist Hero Rebuilt the Kingdom (Japanese: 現実主義勇者の王国再建記, Hepburn: Genjitsu Shugi Yūsha no Ōkoku Saikenki), also known as Re:Construction – The Elfrieden Kingdom Tales of Realistic Brave, (Note: This title is seen on the cover of the Japanese version of the light novel.) is a Japanese light novel series written by Dojyomaru and illustrated by Fuyuyuki. The story follows Kazuya Souma, a humanities-student-turned-hero as he pulls on his knowledge gained from studying politics in order to rebuild the kingdom. A manga adaptation by Satoshi Ueda began serialization online on Overlap's Comic Gardo manga website in July 2017. Digital publisher J-Novel Club has licensed both the light novel and manga for an English release. An anime television series adaptation by J.C.Staff aired from July 2021 to April 2022.

== Plot ==
Kazuya Souma is a young man who is suddenly transported to another world where he is informed by Albert Elfrieden, the king of the Elfrieden Kingdom, that he is abdicating the throne to him. He is also informed that he has been betrothed to Albert's daughter, Liscia. Deciding he is going to rebuild the country's struggling economy, Kazuya gathers talented citizens who are going to help him with the reform.

== Characters ==
=== Main characters ===
Kazuya Souma (相馬 一也 / ソーマ・カズヤ, Sōma Kazuya)
Voiced by: Yūsuke Kobayashi (Japanese); Alejandro Saab (English)
Summoned to another world to reportedly deal with the threat of the Demon Lord's Domain, Kazuya instead finds himself with the throne of the Kingdom of Elfrieden and the hand of Liscia Elfrieden forced on him. Now acting king, Kazuya begins radical reforms in order to improve the standard of living in the kingdom. In the One Week War, Kazuya finds himself in a civil war between himself and Dukes Georg Carmine and Castor Vargas while also having to fight the Principality of Amidonia. Through a series of military strategies, Kazuya emerges victorious and annexes Amidonia (although this was unplanned on his part) to create the Unified Kingdom of Elfrieden and Amidonia, otherwise known as the Kingdom of Friedonia. He then forges a secret alliance with Empress Maria Euphoria of the Gran Chaos Empire. Although he cannot do much combat, he is capable of wielding dark magic. Before his summoning, he was an avid reader.
Liscia Elfrieden (リーシア・エルフリーデン, Rīshia Erufurīden)
Voiced by: Inori Minase (Japanese); Anairis Quiñones (English)
The crown princess of the Elfrieden Kingdom and Kazuya's first fiancée, Liscia was at Kazuya's side from the very beginning. Initially dissatisfied with the unannounced engagement, Liscia soon softens and eventually develops deep feelings for Kazuya. Following the end of the One Week War, both Kazuya and Liscia affirm their love for each other, which results with the beginning of a series of nightly activities. Liscia is tolerant of Kazuya's many female admirers, even encouraging him to take more wives. However, she remains adamant about wanting to remain the first wife.
Aisha Udgard (アイーシャ・ウドガルド, Aīsha Udogarudo)
Voiced by: Ikumi Hasegawa (Japanese); Emily Fajardo (English)
Daughter of the Chief of the Dark Elves of the God Protected Forest, Aisha is one of the five people discovered during the gathering of the Gifted People, the first policy Kazuya implemented upon his impromptu accession to the throne. She serves as Kazuya's bodyguard and falls deeply in love with him during the landslide incident that struck her home. Following the One Week War, Aisha becomes Kazuya's second fiancée in recognition for her actions in that war concerning the hostile Principality of Amidonia. She is an accomplished warrior and big eater and Kazuya thinks of her as a cute pet.
Juna Doma (ジュナ・ドーマ, Juna Dōma)
Voiced by: Reina Ueda (Japanese); Morgan Garrett (English)
Also known as Lady Canaria of the Elfrieden Navy's Marine force, Juna is the granddaughter of Duchess Excel Walter, who was sent to spy on Kazuya when he was first announced as the new King. She is one of the five people discovered during the gathering of the Gifted People. She primarily aids Kazuya in both war and in peace by being the Prima Lorelei, Kazuya's implementation of the concept of the Japanese idol. After falling in love with Kazuya, she is secretly made into his third fiancée with the reason for withholding the fact of their betrothal is the possibility of starting riots when the commonfolk discovers that the famous idol is being wed.
Roroa Amidonia (ロロア・アミドニア, Roroa Amidonia)
Voiced by: M.A.O (Japanese); Jad Saxton (English)
The princess of the former Principality of Amidonia, Roroa Amidonia's craftiness had forced Kazuya to not only take her as his fourth fiancée but also annex the entirety of Amidonian territory instead of just the capital in order to prevent the Turgis Republic and the Orthodox Papal State of Lunaria from getting their claws on the territory after the Principality had lost the war. She has a very keen sense of economics and heads the Silver Deer, a private company whose public face is that of her acquaintance, Sebastian Silvadia.
Naden Delal (ナデン・デラール, Naden Derāru)
A dragon hailing from the Star Dragon Mountain Range, Naden had been bullied for not having wings but Kazuya realized that she was a ryu and made a contract with her despite not being part of the Nothung Dragon Knight Kingdom. Naden eventually became Kazuya's fifth fiancée.

=== Kingdom of Elfrieden/Kingdom of Friedonia ===
Hakuya Kwonmin (ハクヤ・クオンミン, Hakuya Kuonmin)
Voiced by: Kazuyuki Okitsu (Japanese); Howard Wang (English)
The Prime Minister of the Elfrieden Kingdom (now the Kingdom of Friedonia), Hakuya is one of the five people discovered during the gathering of the Gifted People. He serves as Kazuya's right-hand man and has extremely great insight into the human psyche. He is casual friends with Jeanne Euphoria, the younger sister of Maria Euphoria, the Empress of the Gran Chaos Empire.
He has respect for the philosophies Kazuya references, seeing the wisdom Earth holds.
Poncho Panacotta (ポンチョ・パナコッタ, Poncho Panakotta)
Voiced by: Masaaki Mizunaka (Japanese); Jim Foronda (English)
The Minister of Agriculture and Forestry of the Elfriedon Kingdom, Poncho is one of the five people discovered during the gathering of the Gifted People. Due to his vast knowledge of edible delicacies, he was a key player in ending the food shortages in the kingdom. Kazuya has given him the name of Ishizuka.
Tomoe Inui (トモエ・イヌイ, Tomoe Inui)
Voiced by: Moeka Kishimoto (Japanese); Emi Lo (English)
A member of the Mystic Wolf race and one of the five people discovered during the gathering of the Gifted People, Tomoe possesses the rare ability to speak to all manner of beasts and animals. When it was revealed that she could speak to a demon, Kazuya immediately recognized her as extremely valuable and she was adopted by Albert and Elisha Elfrieden in order to shelter her, in the process, becoming Kazuya's sister-in-law-to-be and Liscia's adoptive sister.
Halbert Magna (ハルバート・マグナ, Harubāto Maguna)
Voiced by: Taku Yashiro (Japanese); Kellen Goff (English)
Son of the noble house of Magna and member of the Elfrieden Army under Duke Georg Carmine. He met Kazuya when the king overheard an argument between Halbert and his childhood friend Kaede Foxia. Rather than being arrested for Lese Majeste, Halbert was instead transferred to the Forbidden Army, under Kazuya's jurisdiction. The two have since become friends, and Halbert is one of the few people permitted to disregard the rules of royal etiquette with Kazuya and carry on a casual conversation. In the aftermath of the Storm Crisis, it is revealed that he and Kaede got engaged. He is also partnered with Ruby, a Red Dragon of the Star Dragon Mountain Range.
Kaede Foxia (カエデ・フォキシア, Kaede Fokishia)
Voiced by: Marika Kōno (Japanese); Anjali Kunapaneni (English)
A member of the Mystic Fox race, Kaede is the daughter of the noble house of Foxia, and childhood friend to Halbert Magna. She is an intelligent and talented young woman, and a mage in the Forbidden Army specializing in Earth Magic. She is currently serving as a staff officer under Captain Ludwin Arcs and is Hal's direct superior, a situation that both pleases and irritates the both of them at times. Kaede cares deeply for Hal, and she spoke in his defense when the two first met Kazuya. In the aftermath of the Storm Crisis, it is revealed that she is engaged to Halbert when she chastises him for unthinkingly riding on Ruby's back.
Ludwin Arcs (ルドウィン・アークス, Rudowin Ākusu)
Voiced by: Makoto Furukawa (Japanese); Daman Mills (English)
Captain of the Royal Guard and Commander of the Forbidden Army under the direct command of Kazuya. He is a popular man in Kazuya's royal court, but despite his looks and position, remains unattached. This is mainly due to rumors of financial trouble, as Ludwin is often seen eating the cheapest items on offer in the castle's cafeteria. He is childhood friends with Genia Maxwell, whom he regards with a brotherly affection, despite her eccentricity. After Kazuya realizes Genia's usefulness as an inventor, he and Liscia pressure Ludwin into an engagement to Genia, which he shyly accepts.
Genia Maxwell (ジーニャ・マクスウェル, Jīnya Makusuweru)
Voiced by: Konomi Kohara (Japanese); Steph Garrett (English)
Last of the noble house of Maxwell, and childhood friend of Ludwin. She is an eccentric genius and self-proclaimed Overscientist, specializing in the study of technology and artifacts discovered in the various dungeons found throughout the world. Her talents have been recognized by Kazuya, and the king is currently seeking to develop and implement several of her inventions for the good of the kingdom. In order to ensure her safety and continued loyalty, Kazuya and Liscia convince Ludwin and Genia to get engaged, which Genia shows some minor affections for, but states that she was certain that it would happen someday.
Excel Walter (エクセル・ヴォルター, Ekuseru Vorutā)
Voiced by: Yui Horie (Japanese); Marti Etheridge (English)
A sea serpent who is over 500 years old at the time of Kazuya's summoning. Despite her age, as a member of a "long-lived" race she still has the appearance of a human in her mid-to-late twenties. She is the Admiral of the Kingdom of Elfrieden's Navy, based in Lagoon City of the Walter Duchy. She is the only one of the three duchies to publicly side with Kazuya during the Civil War.
Castor Vargas (カストール・バルガス, Kasutōru Barugasu)
Voiced by: Jun Fukuyama (Japanese); Jason Liebrecht (English)
A dragonewt and the General of the Kingdom of Elfrieden's Air Force. He is a loyal and skilled warrior, yet is impulsive to action. As the head of the Vargas Duchy, he opted during the Civil War to have the Air Force take a neutral stance, but publicly supported Duke Carmine with his personal members of the Air Force. In his youth, he attempted to engage in romantic relations with Duchess Excel Walter, but was rejected. He ended up marrying one of the duchess's daughters, making him her son-in-law. Though defeated and enslaved by Kazuya using a slave collar during the Civil War, Kazuya decided to spare Castor from execution for his treason.
Carla Vargas (カルラ・バルガス, Karura Barugasu)
Voiced by: Aimi (Japanese); Madeleine Morris (English)
A dragonewt and daughter of Castor. She is Castor's eldest child, also having a younger brother named Carl. She is friends with Liscia from their time together at the military academy. Despite Liscia's attempts to use Carla's connection to Castor, Liscia was unable to convince both to support Kazuya during the Civil War. Carla sided with her father during the Civil War despite Castor's attempt to disinherit her along with her mother and brother as to spare her from potential treason charges. They are defeated by Kazuya, who outfits her with a slave collar that forces her to ally with him. Kazuya decided to likewise spare Carla from execution for treason, forcing her to become one of the royal families maids instead. Despite this fall from grace, she has remained in good terms with him and Liscia who still sees her as a friend regardless.
Georg Carmine (ゲオルグ・カーマイン, Georugu Kāmain)
Voiced by: Taiten Kusunoki (Japanese); Marcus D. Stimac (English)
A lion-headed beastman and General of the Kingdom of Elfrieden's Army. He was a loyal vassal, a widely respected tactician, and a mentor to Liscia. However, during the Civil War, he was the public opposition to Kazuya's reign as king. It is revealed after being defeated during the Civil War that he actually supported Kazuya's decisions, but was sacrificing himself to be a rally point for Kazuya's domestic enemies within the nobility of Elfrieden. Though he would be sentenced to be executed for treason, Kazuya offered him "poisoned wine" to escape his sentence. Though officially dead, according to an Elfrieden news report, a leader of Kazuya's personal spy network, the Black Cats, looks suspiciously like the "late" duke.
Albert Elfrieden (アルベルト・エルフリーデン, Aruberuto Erufurīden)
Voiced by: Mugihito (Japanese); Keith Silverstein (English)
The previous king of Elfrieden before Kazuya and father of Liscia. He was regarded as a friendly, yet overall weak, king. In order to satisfy the demands of the Gran Chaos Empire for either supporting funds or a summoned hero, he orders the summoning which brought Kazuya to the world. After seeing Kazuya's initial plans, he abdicates the throne to Kazuya and arranges for Liscia to be married to him. Albert married into the royal family through Elisha and thus is not technically the blood royal. It is also revealed that in an earlier timeline, he dismissed Kazuya due to the aristocrats having issues with him, which resulted in the kingdom's downfall, but through his wife's abilities, his past self learned of this and changed his decision, erasing the dystopian future from existence.
Elisha Elfrieden (エリシャ・エルフリーデン, Erisha Erufurīden)
Voiced by: Kikuko Inoue (Japanese); Anastasia Muñoz (English)
The previous queen of Elfrieden before Kazuya and mother of Liscia. She is a quiet woman who leaves the decisions of leadership to Albert, despite technically being the blood royal. She is the sole survivor of the royal family from the succession war that occurred after "the king before the previous king" died, the "previous king" being Albert. She possesses a dark-type magical ability which she reveals to Kazuya after the events of the Civil War. Her ability enables her to send memories to her past self in order to change patterns of events. She can also use this ability on others at the same time. It is revealed that this ability was the reason she was the survivor of the succession war and was the catalyst for why Albert abdicated the throne to Kazuya.
Gatsby Colbert (ギャツビー・コルベール, Gyatsubī Korubēru)
Voiced by: Seiichiro Yamashita (Japanese); Caleb Yen (English)
The former Minister of Finance of Amidonia and current Minister of Finance of Friedonia. Along with Roroa, he attempted to dissuade Gaius and Julius Amidonia from invading Elfrieden but was unsuccessful, resulting in the One Week War. Before conflict could occur, he disappeared from the Amidonian capital of Van along with Roroa and several other bureaucrats loyal to her. During the Amidonian revolution, he returned with the others and was granted his current position by Kazuya.

=== Principality of Amidonia ===
Gaius Amidonia (ガイウス・アミドニア, Gaiusu Amidonia)
Voiced by: Tetsu Inada (Japanese); Brandon Potter (English)
The last sovereign prince of the Principality of Amidonia, Gaius Amidonia the Eighth is one of the major players during the One Week War. Having trespassed the southwestern border of Elfrieden, Gaius laid siege to the city of Altomura. In a clever plan crafted by Kazuya, Hakuya, and Georg Carmine, Elfrieden was able to outwit Gaius, forcing him to flee back into Amidonia proper. In the subsequent battle, Kazuya himself ended Gaius's life but not before Gaius instructed his son to keep the flames of vengeance burning. Gaius's death resulted in the Elfrieden occupation of Amidonia's capital city, Van.
Julius Amidonia (ユリウス・アミドニア, Yuriusu Amidonia)
Voiced by: Kenji Nojima (Japanese); David Matranga (English)
The son of Gaius and the older brother of Roroa, Julius Amidonia is the prince who hastily inherited his post from his father prior to his death. However, after negotiations with the Gran Chaos Empire ended and Julius was given back his country to govern, rebellions soon rose up due to his ineffective and harsh leadership. Julius himself was driven out of the country, fleeing to the Empire, and with Roroa's intervention, the Principality of Amidonia was annexed into Elfrieden with the added bonus of Princess Roroa's hand in marriage.

=== Gran Chaos Empire ===
Maria Euphoria (マリア = ユーフォリア, Maria Yūforia)
Voiced by: Hisako Kanemoto (Japanese); Dawn M. Bennett (English)
Known as the Saint, Maria is the Empress of the Gran Chaos Empire. Having held up the Declaration of Mankind's Common Front Against the Demon Race, simply, the Mankind Declaration, she is Kazuya's idealistic opposite. After the One Week War and the annexation of Amidonia, Kazuya and Maria forged a secret alliance in order to prepare for a full-on war with the Demon Lord's Domain.
Jeanne Euphoria (ジャンヌ = ユーフォリア, Jan'nu Yūforia)
Voiced by: Yui Ishikawa (Japanese); Michelle Rojas (English)
The younger sister of Maria, she was the one sent by the Gran Chaos Empire to take part in the negotiations of the Kingdom of Elfrieden and the Principality of Amidonia. Since then, she has been in constant contact with the Kingdom of Elfrieden (now the Kingdom of Friedonia) through the broadcasting jewel, especially with the prime minister Hakuya Kwonmin with whom she shares a close relationship, despite having rarely met him in person.

=== Star Dragon Mountain Range ===
Tiamat (ティアマト, Tiamato)
Also known as the Mother Dragon, she is an ancient dragon who is the ruler of the Star Dragon Mountain Range. Her age is unknown, but also possesses the title of Old One, which she does not have the authority to explain. She has great magical powers including transformation into a human form, a form of telepathy, and teleportation abilities.
Ruby (ルビィ, Rubi)
A red dragon who called the Star Dragon Mountain Range home. She was one of the dragons that bullied Naden directly due to her appearance and abilities. During the Storm Crisis in the Star Dragon Mountain Range, she was beaten by the other dragons as they blamed her for Naden's disappearance. After Naden's return, she was the first to decide to help Naden in order to restore her pride in herself. Despite her inability to utilize her wings in the storm, with the assistance of Halbert, she plunged into the storm and aided Naden for several moments before carrying a message to the other dragons. As during these events Halbert rode on her back, Ruby was no longer considered chaste and was contract partnered with Halbert with the blessing of the Mother Dragon.
Pai Long (パイ・ロン, Pai Ron)
A white dragon and the only one that Naden considers a friend. Pai often shows concern for Naden and constantly supports her despite not fully understanding Naden's obsessions with human culture.
Sapphire
A blue dragon and one of Ruby's companions when bullying Naden.
Emerald
A green dragon and one of Ruby's companions when bullying Naden.

== Media ==
=== Light novels ===
Written by Dojyomaru and illustrated by Fuyuyuki, How a Realist Hero Rebuilt the Kingdom originally started as a web novel in 2014 on Shōsetsuka ni Narō, but it was subsequently deleted and resumed on Pixiv. The series was later acquired by Overlap, who published twenty volumes of it as a light novel under their Overlap Bunko imprint from May 25, 2016, to December 25, 2024. Digital English light novel publisher J-Novel Club announced their acquisition of the series on February 23, 2017. The print version is published by Seven Seas Entertainment.

=== Manga ===
A manga adaptation of the series by Satoshi Ueda began serialization on Overlap's Comic Gardo website on July 10, 2017. The series is also licensed in North America by J-Novel Club. As of June 2026, fifteen tankōbon volumes have been released.

=== Anime ===
An anime television series adaptation was announced by Overlap on April 17, 2020. The series was animated by J.C.Staff and directed by Takashi Watanabe, with Gō Zappa and Hiroshi Ōnogi penning the scripts, Mai Otsuka designing the characters, and Akiyuki Tateyama composing the series' music. The first half aired from July 4 to September 26, 2021, on Tokyo MX and BS11. (Note: Tokyo MX listed the series premiere at 25:30 on July 3, 2021 (first half) and January 8, 2022 (second half), which is effectively July 4 and January 9 at 1:30 a.m. JST.) The first half ran for 13 episodes. The second half aired from January 9 to April 3, 2022. The first opening theme song, "Hello Horizon", was performed by Inori Minase, while the first ending theme song, "Kazanear", was performed by Aimi. The second opening theme song is "Real-Eyes" by Inori Minase, while the second ending theme song is "Lights" by Aimi.

Funimation licensed the series outside of Asia. On July 30, 2021, Funimation announced the series would receive an English dub, which premiered the following day. Following Sony's acquisition of Crunchyroll, the series was moved to Crunchyroll. Mighty Media licensed the series in Southeast Asia and streamed it on iQIYI and Bilibili and also aired on Animax starting on March 9, 2022.

== Reception ==
Rebecca Silverman of Anime News Network described the first novel as "feel[ing] a little bit like a thoughtful isekai", and wrote: "It's a bit too fond of info-dumps and has some narrative issues with voice, but generally speaking, if you've ever wanted to see the summoned hero do more than fight the bad guys and win the ladies, this is the book you've been waiting for".
