= Mato Sato =

Japanese novelist

- 佐藤真登
- Occupation: Novelist
- Writing career
- Period: 2017–present
- Genres: Fantasy; adventure; isekai
- Notable work: The Executioner and Her Way of Life

Mato Sato (Japanese: 佐藤真登, Hepburn: Sato Mato) is a Japanese novelist best known for his light novel series The Executioner and Her Way of Life, which won a Grand Prize at the 2018 GA Bunko Awards and was adapted into an anime television series in 2022.

== Career ==
=== Early years ===
Sato's decision to become a novelist was influenced by his childhood, since his family had an extensive collection of books. Initially, during high school, he was busy with studying and extracurricular activities, but in his second year, he improved his time management and found free time for himself. He took up writing stories as a way to fill his free time.

After creating short stories for three years, he began writing a full-length novel. In 2016, he published three volumes of his first series, Hiroin na Imōto, Akuyaku Reijō na Watashi (ヒロインな妹、悪役令嬢な私). In the same year, he submitted a manuscript to a contest by the publishing company Tsugikuru Books, where it was commended as a distinguished work. He published it under the title Usotsuki Senki, Meikyū o Yuku (嘘つき戦姫、迷宮をゆく) in 2017, with four sequel volumes later released.

=== Breakthrough ===
Sato's breakthrough work came with The Executioner and Her Way of Life, which won a Grand Prize at the 2018 GA Bunko Awards, the first awarded in seven years. Sato was surprised but pleased with his win, saying that he "couldn't imagine anyone winning [Grand Prize]". The story was published by GA Bunko in 2019, and the series had over 400,000 copies in circulation by January 2024.

=== Later career ===
Shortly after publishing The Executioner and Her Way of Life, Sato released another light novel, Zen-Kōtei Dorei Shōjo: Ikkai Juppun Sen-rin (全肯定奴隷少女: 1回10分1000リン).

In 2022, an anime adaptation of The Executioner and Her Way of Life was announced. Sato worked closely with the director, Yoshiki Kawasaki, and writer, Shōgo Yasukawa, of the anime adaptation, attending every script meeting to determine which parts of the original work were most essential to adapt. Sato was pleased by the adaptation, announcing that his "heart [was] full of gratitude and excitement" for the show.

Sato wrote ten additional volumes of The Executioner and Her Way of Life, ending with the simultaneous release of the final two volumes in March 2025. The series was adapted into seven manga volumes illustrated by Ryō Mitsuya and crediting Sato as a writer, ending with the release of the final and seventh volume in December 2024.

== Influences and style ==
Sato named Tomihiko Morimi, author of The Night is Short, Walk on Girl, as an inspiration to his approach to engaging storytelling and Kaho Nashiki as an influence to his writing's atmosphere. He was also inspired by anime shows which he began watching around the same time as he started writing his first novel. He named the anime series Darker than Black as a motivation for him to explore a new genre with The Executioner and Her Way of Life.

Sato stated that writing the first volume of The Executioner and Her Way of Life took only two months, and was not difficult. He remarked that he enjoyed the process of revising a manuscript and improving it more than writing it. In terms of his writing process for the story, Sato initially focused on writing a single scene, and worked on the rest of the narrative from there. He wanted to deliberately subvert the isekai genre by incorporating his own original elements. Several aspects of the work were chosen to challenge himself as a writer, such as a focus on darker subject matter and worldbuilding.

== Personal life ==
In a 2019 interview, Sato said he was living in Tokyo. He has two older siblings, whose novel and manga collections helped expose him to literature from a young age.

Sato often talked about struggling with deadlines. In an afterword to the second volume of The Executioner and Her Way of Life, he mentioned that he tried to rewrite the entire second and third chapters of the book three days before the submission deadline.

== Works ==
=== Novels ===
- The Executioner and Her Way of Life (処刑少女の生きる道(バージンロード), Shokei Shōjo no Bājin Rōdo) (2017–2025, 11 volumes, GA Bunko)
- Hiroin na Imōto, Akuyaku Reijō na Watashi (ヒロインな妹、悪役令嬢な私) (2016, 3 volumes, PASH! Books)
- Usotsuki Senki, Meikyū o Yuku (嘘つき戦姫、迷宮をゆく) (2017–2019, 5 volumes, Hero Bunko)
- Zen-Kōtei Dorei Shōjo: Ikkai Juppun Sen-rin (全肯定奴隷少女: 1回10分1000リン) (2019, 1 volume, MF Bunko J)

=== Manga ===
- The Executioner and Her Way of Life (処刑少女の生きる道(バージンロード), Shokei Shōjo no Bājin Rōdo) (2019–2024, 7 volumes, SB Creative)
