= Moe Kahara =

Japanese voice actress

- 佳原 萌枝
- Born: 18 December 2000 (age 25)
- Occupation: Voice actress
- Years active: 2019–present
- Notable work: How a Realist Hero Rebuilt the Kingdom as Tomoe Inui; The Executioner and Her Way of Life as Akari; Undead Unluck as Fuuko Izumo

Moe Kahara (Japanese: 佳原 萌枝, Hepburn: Kahara Moe; born 18 December 2000) is a Japanese voice actress from Osaka Prefecture, affiliated with Holy Peak. She is known for playing Tomoe Inui in How a Realist Hero Rebuilt the Kingdom, Akari in The Executioner and Her Way of Life, and Fuuko Izumo in Undead Unluck.

== Biography ==
Kahara, a native of Osaka Prefecture, was born on 18 December 2000. As an elementary school student, she learned about anime by watching Sailor Moon and Pretty Cure. After hearing about that her favorite novel was being adapted into an anime, she had a question about the characters' voices, and after seeing the voice actors' names on a trailer, she began to consider a career in voice acting. During her first year of high school, she enrolled in the Osaka School of Music and studied acting. After graduating from high school, she moved to Tokyo and joined agency Yūrin Pro, having auditioned during her second year of high school.

Kahara's first job in voice acting was for a browser game. In April 2021, she was cast as Tomoe Inui in How a Realist Hero Rebuilt the Kingdom. In July 2021, she was cast as Akari in The Executioner and Her Way of Life. In March 2022, she was cast as Hasu in In the Heart of Kunoichi Tsubaki. In November 2022, she was cast as Fuuko Izumo in Undead Unluck. She attended the United States premiere of Kaina of the Great Snow Sea: Star Sage at Anime Expo 2023.

She changed her stage name from Moeka Kishimoto (岸本 萌佳, Kishimoto Moeka) to Moe Kahara (佳原 萌枝, Kahara Moe) on 1 July 2021. She left Yūrin Pro on 31 March 2022, and after a period as a freelancer, she transferred to Holy Peak on 1 July 2022.

== Filmography ==
=== Anime television ===
2020

- BanG Dream!, junior high school student B
- Shadowverse, Alice fan
- Yu-Gi-Oh! Sevens, audience

2021

- How a Realist Hero Rebuilt the Kingdom, Tomoe Inui
- Hyperdimension Neptunia, female B
- Mushoku Tensei, Jūzoku child, child B
- Osamake, high school girl B
- Tawawa on Monday, schoolgirl
- The Duke of Death and His Maid, Beto
- The Way of the Househusband, child B

2022

- The Executioner and Her Way of Life, Akari
- Fuuto PI, classmate
- Kiyo in Kyoto, Maiko
- In the Heart of Kunoichi Tsubaki, Hasu
- Play It Cool, Guys, high school girl
- The Strongest Sage with the Weakest Crest, Lilia
- Vermeil in Gold, Rin

2023

- Ayakashi Triangle, girl
- In Another World with My Smartphone, Preliora
- Undead Unluck, Fuuko Izumo

2024

- Murder Mystery of the Dead, Mikoto Amano
- Narenare: Cheer for You!, Shion Tanizaki
- That Time I Got Reincarnated as a Slime, Momiji

2026

- Tune In to the Midnight Heart, Seira Oizumi
- Hana-Kimi, Mayumi Nikaido

=== Animated film ===
2022

- Fruits Basket: Prelude, girl B
- Goodbye, Don Glees!, schoolgirl

=== Video games ===
2019

- Genjū-hime, Poltergeist

2020

- Monster Strike, Nana, Yunitil, Storm
- Requartz Reido, Takatsukasa Mikoto
- Robot Girls Z Online, Wing
- Sakura Kakumei, Shino Sakura

2021

- Genjū Keiyaku Cryptract, Eustia, boy
- Lost Ark, Nia
- 100% Orange Juice!, Halena
- The Idolmaster SideM Growing Stars, young Aslan

2022

- Path to Nowhere, Demolia, Victoria
- Touhou Arcadia Record, Aya Shameimaru

2024

- Umamusume: Pretty Derby, Fusaichi Pandora

2025

- Stella Sora, Cosette
