= List of The Executioner and Her Way of Life volumes =

The Executioner and Her Way of Life is a Japanese light novel series written by Mato Sato and illustrated by Nilitsu, which later received a manga adaptation. The series follows Akari, a girl summoned from Japan to another realm who gains the power to control time, and Menou, a young priestess tasked with killing Akari to protect the stability of her own world.

SB Creative released eleven light novel volumes from July 2019 to March 2025 under its GA Bunko imprint. The series ended with the simultaneous release of the tenth and eleventh volumes in March 2025. A manga adaptation with art by Ryo Mitsuya was serialized in Square Enix's Young Gangan magazine from June 5, 2020, to April 19, 2024. Its chapters were collected in seven tankōbon volumes. On September 24, 2025, Square Enix began releasing English chapters of the manga on its Manga Up! service. Both the light novels and manga are licensed in North America by Yen Press.

== Light novels ==
| No. | Title | Original release date | English release date |
|---|---|---|---|
| 1 | Thus, She Is Reborn; Soshite, Kanojo wa Yomigaeru (そして、彼女は甦る) | July 12, 2019; 978-4-8156-0118-8 (regular edition) March 18, 2022; 978-4-8156-1580-2 (anime adaptation special edition) | March 9, 2021; 978-1-9753-1969-4 |
Chapter 1: "The Executioner"; Chapter 2: "Departure"; Chapter 3: "Terrorist Express from the Royal Capital"; Chapter 4: "At the Ancient Capital"
Menou is a priestess who is tasked with executing Lost Ones, people summoned from Japan, before their powers corrupt them and cause disaster. After two are summoned, she kills one, Mitsuki, but fails to kill the other, Akari, when her power over the Pure Concept of Time unconsciously reverses her death. Realizing Akari, a kind and innocent girl, cannot be killed normally, Menou pretends to be escorting Akari home and takes her to the city of Garm, where the church has prepared a ritual to execute her. Joined by her aide Momo and warrior princess Ashuna, Menou fends off a terrorist attack en route. At Garm, Archbishop Orwell betrays Menou, seeking Akari's power to make herself immortal. Akari escapes, revealing that she has repeatedly reset the world to save Menou, sealing away her memories each time to only return at crucial moments. Menou, with her allies, manages to kill Orwell. Knowing Menou must kill her to avoid being executed herself, which she has failed to do in the past, Akari hides her memories once again. Meanwhile, Menou suspects that Akari knows more than she lets on and vows to Momo that she will dispatch Akari for good.
| 2 | Whiteout; Howaito Auto (ホワイト・アウト) | September 13, 2019; 978-4-8156-0393-9 | July 27, 2021; 978-1-9753-1971-7 |
Chapter 1: "Port City of Libelle"; Chapter 2: "No One Knows Where the Fog Goes"; Chapter 3: "Scattered Sparks at the Evening Ball"; Chapter 4: "Maiden Dried from Dew"; Chapter 5: "Maiden Bathed in Blood"
Menou and Akari arrive in the city of Libelle, next to the Pandæmonium, a sealed-away disaster caused by a Lost One. The local church asks Menou to investigate criminal activity in exchange for travel funds. Her search leads to the Fourth, a terrorist group led by Manon, a noble whose mother was killed by Menou's mentor, Flare, for being a Lost One. Menou infiltrates Manon's ball, and with Momo's assistance, finds enough evidence to arrest Manon. As Menou and Manon fight, Manon is mortally wounded and sacrifices herself to summon a fragment of Pandæmonium, who appears as the young girl who caused the original disaster. Menou defeats Pandæmonium with Ashuna and Akari's help, but before Pandæmonium disappears, she reveals to Menou that the Sword of Salt, a weapon created by another Lost One, can kill Akari. The two start on a journey towards the island where it resides, though Menou grows increasingly troubled by her deception. Elsewhere, Pandæmonium, who escaped, uses her powers to revive Manon using Mitsuki's body.
| 3 | The Cage of Iron Sand; Tessha no Ori (鉄砂の檻) | February 14, 2020; 978-4-8156-0481-3 | November 16, 2021; 978-1-9753-3580-9 |
Chapter 1: "The Traitorous Vessel"; Chapter 2: "The Traitorous Eyes"; Chapter 3: "The Traitorous Heart"; Chapter 4: "The Traitorous Arm"; Chapter 5: "The Traitorous Scripture"
After leaving Libelle, Akari is kidnapped by smugglers. Menou rescues her and Sahara, an old acquaintance, and they travel to Balar Oasis, where they meet Momo and Ashuna. While the others go investigate the smugglers, Momo attempts to take Akari to the Sword of Salt to spare Menou the pain of killing Akari. Akari regains her memories and realizes that the timeline has diverged significantly. She leaves with Momo in the hope that her death will let Menou live. Menou defeats the smugglers, but is betrayed by Sahara, who, jealous over Menou having been chosen as an apprentice by Flare, had sought forbidden power from the Mechanical Society. Menou overcomes Sahara with a conjuring that inadvertently seals Sahara's spirit inside Menou's scripture. Menou returns to find Momo and Akari missing. Elsewhere, Manon, who remains on the run with Pandæmonium, discovers that Menou has no family record.
| 4 | Crimson Nightmare; Akai Akumu (赤い悪夢) | August 6, 2020; 978-4-8156-0713-5 | May 3, 2022; 978-1-9753-3645-5 |
Chapter 1: "The Escape Begins"; Chapter 2: "The Escape Takes a Rest"; Chapter 3: "The Escape at Its Height"; Chapter 4: "The Escape Reaches Its End"; Chapter 5: "And Thus the Chase Begins"
Momo takes Akari to hide at a hot spring town in the mountains. However, Menou deduces where Momo is headed and joins with Ashuna in pursuit. The Fourth in town target Momo and Akari for assassination, with Manon, Pandæmonium, and the former Director of the Fourth en route. Under the guise of combat training, Momo encourages Akari to use her Pure Concept to defeat Fourth assailants. In truth, Momo plots for Akari to overuse her Pure Concept and go berserk as a Human Error, which would prompt the wider church to take action against Akari and free Menou from her mission. However, Momo begins to have doubts as the alternative of sending Akari back to Japan is raised. Pandæmonium steals the scripture holding Sahara's spirit and conjures her a new body. Manon confronts Menou and attempts to recruit her after questioning the nature of scripture conjurings and Lost One abilities. Menou retreats after Pandæmonium, Sahara, and the Director join the fray. Menou attempts to reunite with Akari, but Momo interferes to allow Akari to escape. Master Flare, in the disguise of Ashuna, takes custody of Akari while the real Ashuna interrupts Menou and Momo's battle to reveal Flare's ploy. Flare reveals to Akari the "Four Major Human Errors" caused by Lost Ones were not mindless calamities, but rather attempts at a ritual to return to Japan, breaking her morale. Menou rushes to the train station before Flare can leave with Akari and learns the truth of Akari's repeated time loops to save Menou – and her own repeated death at the hands of Flare for openly defying the church to save Akari. Promising to catch up to Akari later, Menou allows Flare to take Akari away to the Sword of Salt as she reevaluates "her way of life" and searches for a different path forward.
| 5 | The Promised Land; Yakusoku no Chi (約束の地) | February 10, 2021; 978-4-8156-0936-8 | October 4, 2022; 978-1-9753-4561-7 |
Chapter 1: "Invading the Holy Land"; Chapter 2: "Unrest in the Holy Land"; Chapter 3: "Chaos in the Holy Land"; Chapter 4: "Despair in the Holy Land"; Chapter 5: "The Land of Salt"
| 6 | A Casket of Salt; Shio no Hitsugi (塩の柩) | August 12, 2021; 978-4-8156-1140-8 | March 21, 2023; 978-1-9753-5006-2 |
Chapter 1: "Those Who Take Back"; Chapter 2: "Lost to Time"; Chapter 3: "The Last Nail"; Chapter 4: "A Heart That Harbors a Farewell"
| 7 | Lost; Rosuto (ロスト) | April 14, 2022; 978-4-8156-1399-0 | March 26, 2024; 978-1-9753-8063-2 |
Chapter 1: "Flarette"; Chapter 2: "Pandæmonium's Pinky"; Chapter 3: "Governor of the Fourth"; Chapter 4: "Ability Control"; Chapter 5: "Pure Concept 'Time'"
| 8 | Fall Down; Fōru Daun (―フォール・ダウン―) | March 14, 2023; 978-4-8156-1723-3 | July 23, 2024; 978-1-9753-8833-1 |
Chapter 1: "Underground Hub"; Chapter 2: "City of Ruins"; Chapter 3: "Star's Shell"; Chapter 4: "Time's Nap"; Chapter 5: "Genom Cthulha"; Chapter 6: "Evil's Awakening"
| 9 | Wish Upon a Star, Pray to a Flower; Hoshi ni Negai wo, Hana ni Inori wo (―星に願いを、花に祈りを―) | January 15, 2024; 978-4-8156-2514-6 | August 12, 2025; 979-8-8554-0890-4 |
Chapter 1: "Scheme"; Chapter 2: "Strife"; Chapter 3: "Sedition"; Chapter 4: "Stirring"; Chapter 5: "Sentiment"; Chapter 6: "Start"
| 10 | Otherworlders Must Die; Isekai Hito Shi Subeshi (―異世界人死すべし―) | March 15, 2025; 978-4-8156-2515-3 | May 12, 2026; 979-8-8554-2744-8 |
| 11 | Curtain Call; Kāten Kōru (―カーテン・コール―) | March 15, 2025; 978-4-8156-2516-0 | November 10, 2026; 979-8-8554-2747-9 |

== Manga ==
| No. | Original release date | Original ISBN | English release date | English ISBN |
|---|---|---|---|---|
| 1 | February 9, 2021 | 978-4-7575-7098-6 | October 18, 2022 | 978-1-9753-5114-4 |
Chapter 1: "A Chance Meeting, and..."; Chapter 2: "All for the Sake of This World"; Chapter 3: "Intertwining Fates"; Chapter 4: "The Journey Begins"; Chapter 5: "The Path to Destiny"; Chapter 6: "Primary Red"; Interlude: "Killing Time"
| 2 | August 10, 2021 | 978-4-7575-7414-4 | April 18, 2023 | 978-1-9753-5229-5 |
Chapter 7: "Berserker"; Chapter 8: "Final Strike"; Chapter 9: "Pure Trust"; Chapter 10: "The Will to Walk On"; Chapter 11: "Ancient Capital Garm"; Chapter 12: "Guiding Figure"; Chapter 13: "Cries for Help"; Interlude: "Prelude to a Journey"
| 3 | March 25, 2022 | 978-4-7575-7838-8 | September 19, 2023 | 978-1-9753-6195-2 |
Chapter 14: "Crossing Time"; Chapter 15: "What Matters Most"; Chapter 16: "My Best Friend; Chapter 17: "Way of Life"; Chapter 18: "City of Fog"; Chapter 19: "The Fourth"
| 4 | June 23, 2022 | 978-4-7575-7982-8 | January 23, 2024 | 978-1-9753-7550-8 |
Chapter 20: "Until the Day Comes"; Chapter 21: "An Unexpected Reunion"; Chapter 22: "Undercover Investigation"; Chapter 23: "Iron Maiden"; Chapter 24: "The Time of Rebirth"; Chapter 25: "The Right to Rebel"; Chapter 26: "B Movie"
| 5 | March 25, 2023 | 978-4-7575-8484-6 | September 17, 2024 | 979-8-8554-0235-3 |
Chapter 27: "Opening"; Chapter 28: "Do or Die"; Chapter 29: "The Cost of Regression"; Chapter 30: "Ending"; Chapter 31: "Beyond Chaos"; Chapter 32: "Stronghold in the Sand"; Chapter 33: "Their Intentions"
| 6 | August 25, 2023 | 978-4-7575-8737-3 | February 18, 2025 | 979-8-8554-0237-7 |
Chapter 34: "The Definition of Life"; Chapter 35: "Servant of Disaster"; Chapter 36: "Reunion at the Water's Edge"; Chapter 37: "The Beginning"; Chapter 38: "From Here On"; Interlude: "Until That Day Arrives"
| 7 | September 25, 2024 | 978-4-7575-9433-3 | December 30, 2025 | 979-8-8554-1938-2 |
Chapter 39: "Dance of the Princess Knight"; Chapter 40: "Undercover Operation"; Chapter 41: "The Attached Vessel"; Chapter 42: "Proof of Being Special"; Chapter 43: "A Scorching Blaze"; Chapter 44: "Vessel and Ivory"; Chapter 45: "A Pure Blank White"; Chapter 46: "That Which Should Not Exist"; Chapter 47: "Where the Road Leads"
