= Kurihara (surname) =

Kurihara (written: 栗原) is a Japanese surname. Notable people with the surname include:

- Ayane Kurihara (born 1989), Japanese badminton player
- Ayumi Kurihara (born 1984), joshi puroresu wrestler.
- Harumi Kurihara (born 1947), Japanese celebrity homemaker and television personality
- Hiroko Kurihara, American designer and activist
- Hitomi Kurihara (born 1981), Japanese actress
- Joseph Kurihara (1895–1965), Japanese American internee who renounced U.S. citizenship under the Renunciation Act of 1944 in protest of the internment
- Katsushi Kurihara (born 1977), Japanese football player
- Kazuaki Kurihara (born 1979), Japanese instructor of Shotokan karate
- Keisuke Kurihara (born 1973), Japanese football player and manager
- Keisuke Kurihara (motorcyclist) (born 1997), Japanese motorcycle racer
- Kenneth K. Kurihara, Japanese-American professor of economic theory
- Kenta Kurihara (born 1982), Japanese batting coach
- Koji Kurihara (born 1964), Japanese sprinter
- Komaki Kurihara (born 1945), Japanese stage and film actress
- Louis Kurihara (born 1994), Japanese fashion model, TV personality and actor
- Megumi Kurihara (born 1984), Japanese volleyball player
- Michio Kurihara (born 1961), Japanese guitarist
- Mika Kurihara (born 1989), Japanese basketball player
- Ryoya Kurihara (born 1996), Japanese baseball player
- Sadako Kurihara (1913–2005), Japanese poet
- Shigeru Kurihara (born 1970), Japanese gymnast
- Takashi Kurihara (born 1947) Japanese golfer
- Thomas Kurihara (1885–1926), Japanese actor and film director
- Toru Kurihara (born 1978), Japanese rugby union player
- Yasuhide Kurihara (1908–1936), Imperial Japanese Army officer who was a conspirator in the February 26 Incident in 1936
- Yuzo Kurihara (born 1983), Japanese football player

== See also ==
- Kurihara (disambiguation)
