= The One. Later On... =

Japanese light novel series

- First light novel volume cover

その者。のちに… (Sono Mono. Nochi ni...)
- Genre: Fantasy
- Novel series
- Written by: NAHAaTO
- Published by: Shōsetsuka ni Narō
- Original run: September 24, 2015 – March 20, 2016
- Light novel
- Written by: NAHAaTO
- Illustrated by: Miya Kazumoto
- Published by: Earth Star Entertainment
- Imprint: Earth Star Novel
- Original run: August 15, 2016 – August 10, 2019
- Volumes: 12 + 1 side story
- Manga
- Written by: NAHAaTO
- Illustrated by: Urasuke Ayano
- Published by: Earth Star Entertainment
- Imprint: Earth Star Comics
- Magazine: Comic Earth Star
- Original run: March 31, 2017 – August 31, 2017
- Volumes: 1
- Manga
- Written by: NAHAaTO
- Illustrated by: Shinichiro Nariie
- Published by: Earth Star Entertainment
- English publisher: NA: Titan Manga
- Imprint: Earth Star Comics
- Magazine: Comic Earth Star
- Original run: August 31, 2018 – present
- Volumes: 6
- Anime television series
- Directed by: Koichi Ohata (chief); Seung Deok Kim
- Written by: Koichi Ohata; Hisashi Morimiya
- Studio: Jumondou
- Original run: 2027 – scheduled

The One. Later On... (Japanese: その者。のちに…, Hepburn: Sono Mono. Nochi ni...) is a Japanese light novel series written by NAHAaTO and illustrated by Miya Kazumoto. It was originally serialized as a web novel on the online publication platform Shōsetsuka ni Narō from September 2015 to March 2016. Earth Star Entertainment later began publishing it as a light novel under their Earth Star Novel imprint, releasing 12 volumes and a side story volume between August 2016 and August 2019. A manga adaptation illustrated by Urasuke Ayano was serialized on Earth Star Entertainment's Comic Earth Star service from March to August 2017, with its chapters compiled into a single volume. A second manga adaptation illustrated by Shinichiro Nariie began serialization on the same service in August 2018, with six volumes released as of November 2022. An anime television series adaptation produced by Jumondou is set to premiere in 2027.

== Plot ==
Wazu, an adventurer still haunted by the memory of being rejected by his childhood friend Aria, trains for two years in the mountains, hoping to get stronger. During his training, he discovers that he has become an S-Rank adventurer, now strong enough to defeat the Demon Lord. Despite his newfound strength, he realizes that he still has poor luck regarding love, especially regarding his new crush Salona.

== Characters ==
Wazu (ワズ)
Voiced by: Kent Itō
An adventurer who spent two years training in the mountains. He was previously engaged to his childhood friend Aria, only for that engagement to be broken off after she becomes engaged to the Hero. Heartbroken, Wazu leaves their villages and takes up training to get stronger. Even after getting stronger, he still has not gained more luck when it comes to love.
Salona (サローナ, Sarōna)
A warrior from the elf village, who is known for her beauty. Wazu has feelings for her, although she does not reciprocate his feelings.
Mear (メア, Mea)
Voiced by: Yui Ogura
Tata (タタ)

== Media ==
=== Light novels ===
NAHAaTO originally serialized the series as a web novel on the online publication platform Shōsetsuka ni Narō, posting chapters between September 24, 2015, and March 20, 2016, with four bonus chapters being released on August 15, 2016. Earth Star Entertainment later began publishing it as a light novel under their Earth Star Novel imprint, releasing twelve volumes between August 15, 2016, and April 15, 2019, with a side story volume being released on August 10, 2019.

No.	Release date	ISBN
1	August 15, 2016	978-4-8030-0952-1
2	November 15, 2016	978-4-8030-0968-2
3	January 16, 2017	978-4-8030-0986-6
4	April 15, 2017	978-4-8030-1036-7
5	July 15, 2017	978-4-8030-1082-4
6	October 17, 2017	978-4-8030-1122-7
7	January 16, 2018	978-4-8030-1151-7
8	April 16, 2018	978-4-8030-1184-5
9	July 14, 2018	978-4-8030-1212-5
10	October 16, 2018	978-4-8030-1239-2
11	January 17, 2019	978-4-8030-1262-0
12	April 15, 2019	978-4-8030-1288-0
SS	August 10, 2019	978-4-8030-1326-9

=== Manga ===
A manga illustrated by Urasuke Ayano was serialized on Earth Star Entertainment's Comic Earth Star service from March 31 to August 31, 2017, with its chapters compiled into a single tankōbon volume released on October 17, 2017. A second manga adaptation illustrated by Shinichiro Nariie began serialization on the same service on August 31, 2018. The first tankōbon volume was released on February 12, 2019; six volumes have been released as of November 11, 2022. The second manga series is licensed in English by Titan Manga.

==== First series ====
No.	Release date	ISBN
1	October 17, 2017	978-4-8030-1119-7

==== Second series ====
No.	Original release date	Original ISBN	English release date	English ISBN
1	February 12, 2019	978-4-8030-1266-8	June 9, 2026	978-1-78774-743-2
2	August 10, 2019	978-4-8030-1320-7	October 27, 2026	978-1-78774-744-9
3	February 13, 2020	978-4-8030-1381-8	January 6, 2027	978-1-78774-745-6
4	June 12, 2021	978-4-8030-1525-6	—	—
5	February 10, 2022	978-4-8030-1611-6	—	—
6	November 11, 2022	978-4-8030-1710-6	—	—

=== Anime ===
On November 22, 2026, an anime television series adaptation was announced. It will be produced by Jumondou and directed by Seung Deok Kim, with Koichi Ohata serving as chief director, handling series composition with Hisashi Morimiya, and designing the characters with Choi Yeon-soo. The series is set to premiere in 2027. The opening theme song will be performed by Kent Itō.

== See also ==
- Sexiled, another light novel series by the same illustrator
