= Kazuaki =

- Gender: Male

Origin
- Origin: Japanese
- Meaning: Different meanings depending on the kanji used

Kazuaki (written: 和明, 和昭, 和彰, 一晃, 一信, 一章, 一西 or 一昭) is a masculine Japanese given name. Notable people with the name include:

- Kazuaki Ando (安藤 和明; born 1967), Japanese freestyle skier
- Kazuaki Hayashi (林 一章; born 1976), Japanese football goalkeeper (J2 League)
- Kazuaki Ichimura (市村 和昭; born 1957), Japanese speed skater
- Kazuaki Kamizono (上園 和明; born 1981), Japanese footballer
- Kazuaki Kimura (木村 一信; 1946–2015), Japanese scientist
- Kazuaki Kiriya (紀里谷 和明; born 1968), Japanese photographer, film director and music video director
- Kazuaki Koezuka (肥塚 一晃; born 1967), Japanese football midfielder (J.League)
- Kazuaki Kurihara (born 1979), Japanese Shotokan karate instructor
- Kazuaki Mawatari (馬渡 和彰; born 1991), Japanese football midfielder (J.League)
- Kazuaki Mimoto (三本 和明; born 1972), Japanese rower
- Kazuaki Minami (南 和彰; born 1981), Japanese baseball pitcher
- Kazuaki Miyaji (宮路 和明; born 1940), Japanese politician
- Kazuaki Nagasawa (長澤 和明; born 1958), Japanese football midfielder and manager
- Kazuaki Sasaki (佐々木 一昭; born 1967), Japanese cyclist
- Kazuaki Takano (高野 和明; born 1964), Japanese writer
- Kazuaki Tanahashi (棚橋 一晃; born 1933), Japanese calligrapher, Zen teacher, writer and translator
- Kazuaki Tasaka (田坂 和昭; born 1971), Japanese football midfielder (J.League)
- Toda Kazuaki (戸田 一西; 1542–1604), Japanese samurai
