= Fushi Tantei Reidō Momiji =

Japanese light novel series

- First light novel volume cover

不死探偵・冷堂紅葉
- Genre: Mystery
- Light novel
- Written by: Shizuku Rei
- Illustrated by: Rag Miwano
- Published by: SB Creative
- Imprint: GA Bunko
- Original run: July 14, 2023 – present
- Volumes: 4
- Manga
- Written by: Shizuku Rei
- Illustrated by: Touka Kusumoto
- Published by: Kill Time Communication
- Magazine: KimiComi; Comic Shiny
- Original run: October 27, 2026 – present

Fushi Tantei Reidō Momiji (不死探偵・冷堂紅葉; lit. 'Immortal Detective Momiji Reidō') is a Japanese light novel series written by Shizuku Rei and illustrated by Rag Miwano. The series began publication under SB Creative's GA Bunko imprint in July 2023; four volumes have been released as of June 2026. A manga adaptation illustrated by Touka Kusumoto began serialization on Kill Time Communication's KimiComi and Comic Shiny manga services in October 2026.

== Plot ==
The series follows Haruma Amanai, a high school student and a fan of detective novels. One day, a new student named Momiji Reidō transfers to his class. While touring Momiji around the school, they discover that one of their classmates, Yamato Sasamura, had been murdered. The two decide to investigate Yamato's murder, taking advantage of Haruma's time travel powers and Momiji's immortality.

== Characters ==
Haruma Amanai (天内 晴麻, Amanai Haruma)
A high school student. He is interested in detective novels and runs his own literature study group, separate from the school's main Literature Club. He is an expert in kendo. He has the ability to go back in time by kissing.
Momiji Reidō (冷堂 紅葉, Reidō Momiji)
A new student who transferred to Haruma's class. Despite appearances, she is actually 24 years old, being immortal. She also becomes a member of Haruma's literature group.

== Media ==
=== Light novel ===
The series is written by Shizuku Rei and illustrated by Rag Miwano. The novel was originally submitted to a competition run by SB Creative's GA Bunko imprint under the title Kimi to Saigo no Kiss o Suru (君と最後のキスをする, Kimi to Saigo no Kisu o Suru), later being chosen as one of four Silver Award winners. Rei had an interest in mystery novels since junior high school, finding satisfaction in following mysteries and solving puzzles; they also cited the visual novel series Umineko When They Cry as an inspiration. They were inspired to write the novel after watching Evangelion: 3.0+1.0 Thrice Upon a Time; the novel's original title was a reference to Hikaru Utada's song "One Last Kiss", which was used in the film. SB Creative released the first volume on July 14, 2023; four volumes have been released as of June 2026.

| No. | Japanese release date | Japanese ISBN |
|---|---|---|
| 1 | July 14, 2023 | 978-4-8156-2149-0 |
| 2 | November 15, 2023 | 978-4-8156-2150-6 |
| 3 | August 12, 2025 | 978-4-8156-3656-2 |
| 4 | June 15, 2026 | 978-4-8156-3980-8 |

=== Manga ===
A manga adaptation illustrated by Touka Kusumoto began serialization on Kill Time Communication's KimiComi and Comic Shiny manga services on October 27, 2026.

== Reception ==
The series ranked highly in multiple surveys by the website Anime! Anime! on light novels that people wanted to see adapted into an anime, ranking 2nd for the first half of 2024, and 1st for the second half of 2024 and the first half of 2025. The first and second volumes received multiple awards from the Ranobe News Online Awards in 2023. The series was included in the 2024 edition of Kono Light Novel ga Sugoi!, ranking 12th in the paperback category and 8th in the new release category.
