= Shinichiro Nariie =

Japanese manga artist (born 1984)

Shinichiro Nariie 成家慎一郎
- Born: 18 May 1984 (age 42) Ishinomaki, Tōhoku Region, Japan
- Area: Manga
- Pseudonyms: Kusakari Ichiro; Naruse Yoshiki

Shinchiro Nariie (Japanese: 成家慎一郎; born 18 May 1984) is a Japanese manga artist. He made his debut with the work Gerard (ジェラール) in 2004. He has published works under the pseudonyms Kusakari Ichiro (草刈 一朗) and Naruse Yoshiki (成瀬芳貴).

Nariie has publicly declared himself to be a trans man.

== Published works ==
=== Manga and lights novels ===
Series

Published under the name Naruse Yoshiki:

- Kyōdai -BROTHER- (兄弟-BROTHER-), serialised in the magazine Gangan WING
- Jūgo Meisatsu Kōgyō Kōkō Ragubī-bu (15 明刹工業高校ラグビー部), serialised by Gangan ONLINE in 2010 and 2011

Published under the name Shinichiro Nariie:

- Steins;Gate Aishin Meizu no Baberu (STEINS;GATE 哀心迷図のバベル), original work by MAGES.; serialized in Ultra Jump between 2012 and 2014
- Absolute Duo (アブソリュート・デュオ Abusoryūto Dyuo), original story by Takumi Hiiragi; original character design by Yū Asaba. Serialized in Monthly Comic Alive between 2013 and 2017
- Cross x Regalia (クロス×レガリア), original story by Makoto Sanda; original character designs by Yūgen. Serialized in Famitsu Comic Clear between 2013 and 2015
- Drop Frame (ドロップフレーム), serialized in Comic REX from the April 2015 issue to the December 2016 issue
- Rapaz Tēma Pāku (ラパス・テーマパーク), serialized in Ultra Jump between 2015 and 2018
- Manaka no Mori, serialized in Comic Heaven from the April 2017 issue to the November 2018 issue; the series was canceled
- Shin'en Rejisuto CURE (シンエンレジスト CURE), original story by AltPlus/SCBIZ and script by Kazuyoshi Yamamoto. Serialized in Ultra Jump from the September 2018 issue to the August 2019 issue
- The One. Later On... (その者。のちに… 〜気がついたらS級最強!? 勇者ワズの大冒険〜 Sono Mono. Nochi ni… 〜Ki ga Tsuitara S-kyū Saikyō!? Yūsha Wazu no Daibōken〜), serialized in Comic Earth Star since 31 August 2018 and continues in publication
- See You Tomorrow at the Food Court (フードコートで、また明日。 Fūdo Kōto de, Mata Ashita.), serialized in Comic Newtype since 10 March 2020 and is still ongoing, has an anime adaptation
- Oshiego-kun to wa Dekimasen (教え子くんとはデキません), serialized in GetsuMaga Kichi since 17 November 2023 and is still ongoing. It is the commercial serialized version of a work that the author had previously published on his personal X account under the title Dekkaku natta seito ni kyūkon sareru hanashi (でっかくなった生徒に求婚される話).

One-shots

- Jūgo Meisatsu Kōgyō Kōkō Ragubī-bu (15 明刹工業高校ラグビー部), published in Gangan ONLINE in 2009. It consists of two chapters
- Shinken Zemi Chūgaku Kōza (進研ゼミ中学講座), promotional manga published in 2014
- PSI, published in the magazine Pollyanna
- Kimi to Iru Shima (君といる島), published in 2020 by Charles Comics
- Tottemo Yasashii Tegome-san (とってもやさしい手籠さん), published in the June 2021 issue of Young King BULL.

=== Other jobs ===
- Hanajutsushi (花術師), a novel written by Tamaki Itomori and published by Futabasha in 2012. Nariie was in charge of the illustrations.
