= GA Bunko =

Japanese publishing imprint

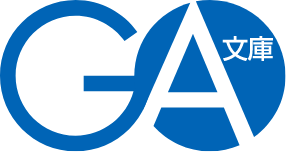
GA Bunko logo

GA Bunko (GA文庫) is a publishing label affiliated with the Japanese publishing company SB Creative, a subsidiary of Softbank. It was established in January 2006 and is a light novel label. The label is aimed at males in their teens to their twenties.

== Light novels published under GA Bunko ==
=== 0–9 ===
Title	Author	Illustrator	No. of volumes
29 to JK	Yuji Yuji	Yan-Yam	8
8 Girls Odyssey	Chikashi Yoshida	Uki	1

=== A ===
Title	Author	Illustrator	No. of volumes
Akitsushima	Yūki Takano	Kaori Minakami	3
Alchemist no Nirvana	Kisetsu Morita	Natsuki Haruka	5
Ar tonelico: Melody of Elemia	Kei Tanaka & Gust Corporation, Banpresto	Nagira	1
Ayakashi Maniacs!	Tane Kakino	An Inugahora	5
Ayakashi Rotenshou Tikitaka	Itsuki Inoue	Yuran	2

=== B ===
Title	Author	Illustrator	No. of volumes
Bakerano!	Hikaru Sugii	Akahito	2
Black Magic	Hideki Kakinuma, Masamune Shirow (Original Creator)	Harusame Tsubaki	2
Boku no Shion	Tōru Honda	Hisashi Momose	3
Bōkyaku Kenshi no Excellio	Mamoru Nagamono	Hirotaka Akagi	1

=== C ===
Title	Author	Illustrator	No. of volumes
Calamity Knight: Alternative	Kanata Takase	Reine Hibiki	2
Charlotte wa Glass no Kutsu no Yume wo miruka	Yoshihiro Tsuzuki	Yōko Fujioka	1
Chōjin-Kokoseitachi wa Isekai demo Yoyu de Ikinuku Yōdesu!	Riku Misora	Sacraneco	8
Chō-jitaku Keibi Shōjo Chinori	Yasumi Obata	Shū	1
Chūko demo Koi ga Shitai!	Noritake Tao	ReDrop	5
Clear Voice	Yukiko Iida	Nagare Yūryū	1
Crazy Kangaroo no Natsu	Ako Yoshimi	Miyuki Fujimoto	2

=== D ===
Title	Author	Illustrator	No. of volumes
De-ko-tsu-n	Kenji Nojima	Sugar-Piccola	1
Demon's Summoner	Yūji Nakazato	Riya Hozumi	4
Die Nachtjäger	Yūichi Suzumoto	Kazumi	1
Dungeon ni Deai o Motomeru no wa Machigatteiru Darō ka?	Fujino Ōmori	Suzuhito Yasuda	18

=== E ===
Title	Author	Illustrator	No. of volumes
EX!	Oda Kyōdai	Uki	15

=== F ===
Title	Author	Illustrator	No. of volumes
Fata Morgana no Yakata: Anata no Genten ni Itaru Monogatari	Keika Hanada	Moyataro	4
Furifuro	Tōru Takasaki	Okurō Tsuchida	1
Fushi Tantei Reidō Momiji	Shizuku Rei	Rag Miwano	3

=== G ===
Title	Author	Illustrator	No. of volumes
Gin no Te no Shiva: Hakase to Kotori	Tōya Tachihara	Mizuki Takayama & Shūji Sokabe	1
Goblin Slayer	Kumo Kagyu	Noboru Kannatuki	6
Genocide Reality finally getting published	Fujinyama	Keroshiki	2

=== H ===
Title	Author	Illustrator	No. of volumes
Haikyo Hotel e Yōkoso	Rio Matsudono	Ganpon	2
Haiyore! Nyaruko-san	Manta Aisora	Koin	12
Hanamori	Tesshū Echigoya	Jū Ayakura	1
Hankōki no Imōto wo Maō no Chikara de Shinai Shite Mita	Akira	Subaru Homura	4
Hanon: Kimi no Mezasu Ashita e	Oda Kyōdai	Eiji Totsuka	1
Happy Death Day	Kōta Nozomi	Akira Banpai	2
Hareta Sora ni Kujira	Kagaku Ōnishi	refeia	3
Hauhau	Tōmon Bugi	Koin	1
Hikikomari Kyūketsuki no Monmon	Kotei Kobayashi	Riichu	11
Hundred	Jun Misaki	Nekosuke Ōkuma	7

=== I ===
Title	Author	Illustrator	No. of volumes
Inō-Battle wa Nichijō-kei no Naka de	Kota Nozomi	029	12
Irregular's Rebellion	Shizuku Ochi	Ochau	3
Isa to Yuki	Aoi Yūya	Kakeru Mikazuki	5
Ittōu Ryōudan no Amber Kiss	Senya Mihagi	Coffee Neko	2

=== J ===
Title	Author	Illustrator	No. of volumes
Jinx Game	Ataru Adachi	Niritsu	3
Johnpei to Boku to	Kagaku Ōnishi	Ginpachi	4
Jōki Teikoku Sōdōki	Yasuhiro Kawasaki	Katsuhiko Yūki	3

=== K ===
Title	Author	Illustrator	No. of volumes
Kagura Kenbu no Aerial	Jujin Chiba	Masato Mutsumi	4
Kamen Majo no Resistance	Ken Suebashi	Manyako	2
Kamisama ga Yōi Shitekureta Basho	Arimi Yazaki	Fuzzy	3
Kamunagi	Jun Okigaki	Munch Mutsuki	5
Karakuri-sō no Ijin tachi	Kei Shimojima	Migi	2
Kawaii Onnanoko ni Kōryaku Sareru no Wa Suki desu ka?	Seiju Amano	Kakao	5
Kishiō Kōho no Guarvant	Hiro Itō	Kurogin	2
Koko wa Mahō Shōnen Ikusei Center	Saori Kumi	Yuri Narushima	5
Kuraki wa Ware wo ōu	Ken Asamatsu	Ryō Kanai	3
Kyokō no Senshi	Okina Kamino	Yūichirō Tanuma	3

=== L ===
Title	Author	Illustrator	No. of volumes
Light novel no Tanoshii kakikata	Tōru Honda	Kasumi Kirino	10
Lady General	Masayuki Chida	Shōshirō Shirayuki	3

=== M ===
Title	Author	Illustrator	No. of volumes
Maid Deka	Yūji Hayami	Kiyotaka Haimura	9
Mal'ākh no Tane: Katayoku no Kioku	Hiromi Hosoe	Mikako Mikaki	1
Maō to Hime to Ecchi no Hon	Otsukai Shimono	Syroh	2
MAPS: Shared world	Yūichi Hasegawa (Original Creator)		2
Meikyū-gai Chronicle	Ryōsuke Hayashi	Tsuyuki	1
Metal Witch Sisters	Yū Hibiki	Koin	4
Mugen no Linkage	Akamitsu Awamura	Senmu	5

=== N ===
Title	Author	Illustrator	No. of volumes
No-Rin	Shirō Shiratori	Kippu	12

=== O ===
Title	Author	Illustrator	No. of volumes
Oda Nobuna no Yabō	Mikage Kasuga	Miyama-Zero	10
Odoru Hoshi Furu Reneshikuru	Yuuji Yuuji	TakayaKi	6
Ore no Kanojo to Osananajimi ga Shuraba Sugiru	Yuuji Yuuji	Ruroo	18 + Extra
Oto x Maho	Shū Shirase	Yasu	16
Otonari no Mahō tsukai	Sami Shinozaki	Osamu Oya	3
Otonari no Tenshi-sama ni Itsu no Ma ni ka Dame Ningen ni Sareteita Ken	Saekisan	Hanekoto	10 + 2 Short stories

=== P ===
Title	Author	Illustrator	No. of volumes
Parallel Mariners	Kōichi Kino	Sikorsky	2
Pochi no Winning shot	Shin'ya Kasai	John Hathway	2
Princess Sword!	Okina Kamino	Waka Miyama	5

=== Q ===
Title	Author	Illustrator	No. of volumes
Quintet!	Tesshū Echigoya	Senmu	2

=== R ===
Title	Author	Illustrator	No. of volumes
Radical Elements	Shirō Shiratori	Haruaki Katō	3
Rakudai Kishi no Eiyūtan	Riku Misora	Won	18
Ryūō no Oshigoto!	Shirow Shiratori	Shirabi	14

=== S ===
Title	Author	Illustrator	No. of volumes
Sacred Chronicle	Rei Mikogami	KeG	1
Sadistic Agent	Yūji Nakazato	Imusanjo	2
Sahō Tsukai no Shishō-chan	Kemuri Haruhara	Koin	2
Saijaku Muhai no Bahamut	Senri Akatsuki	Ayumu Kasuga	15
Samurai Guard	Hikaru Maisaka	Yui Shiino	2
Sanada Jūyūki!	Takuya Baba	Yūji Naruse	3
School Girl Strikers Novel Channel	Ichirō Sakaki, Keiichi Hikami, Seiju Amano, Yū Hibiki	Gen Kobayashi, Hinase Momoyama	2
Seiken Tsukai no World Break	Akamitsu Awamura	refeia	5
Senjin Gaishi	Isamu Hanada	Masaki Hirooka	4
Senpūden: Rera-Siw	Ken Asamatsu	Akihiro Yamada	3
Shaggy Dog	Akira Nanao	Miyagi	5
Shamrock	Miya Sawagami	Yūri Nishiwaki	12
Shinkyoku Sōkai Polyphonica	Ichirō Sakaki (Crimson); Jun'ichi Ōsako (Black & Leon the Resurrector); Madoka Takatono (White); Toshihiko Tsukiji (Blue); Kōhei Azano (Don Sariel) et al.	Noboru Kannazuki (Crimson); Bunbun (Black); Hiro Kinako (White, 1-5); Kasumi Nagi (White, 6-); Eiji Usatsuka (Blue); Shōryū Shinobu (Leon); Kazuaki (Don Sariel)	10 (Crimson); 10 (Black); 6 (White); 2 (Blue); 3 (Leon); 1 (Don Sariel); 2 (Marble); 1 (Palette)
Shokei Shōjo no Virgin Road	Mato Sato	Nilitsu	4
Shōnen Kyūmashi to Koi suru Otome	Rei Mikogami	Tetsuhiro Nabeshima	2
Sōkai Girls!	Shirow Shiratori	Yasuyuki	3
Sol Bright	Ransei Etō	Komeko Amajio	3
S.P.A.T.!	Yūki Takano	Tsukune Taira	1
Storage Over	Akira Nakao	Toworu Takura	3
Surveillance Manual	Ryōko Seki	Taketo Sanada	4
Survived Five	Shin'ya Kasai	Shōtarō Tokunō	3
Sword Junker	Sow Kamishiro	Chinatsu Kurahana	1

=== T ===
Title	Author	Illustrator	No. of volumes
Tatoeba Last Dungeon Mae no Mura no Shōnen ga Joban no Machi de Kurasu Yō na Monogatari	Toshio Satō	Nao Watanuki	7
Tenjō Ugatsu Shinma no Ken	Kōichi Takagi	Koin	3
Tenshi ga ochita Machi	Akio Higuchi	Suke Akurō	1
Tensai Ōji no Akaji Kokka Saisei Jutsu: Sō da, Baikoku Shiyō	Toru Toba	fal_maro	8
Tokyo Stray Wizards	Eita Nakatani	Riv	1
Tomodachi no Imōto ga Ore ni Dake Uzai	Ghost Mikawa	Tomari	6

=== U ===
Title	Author	Illustrator	No. of volumes
Uchi no Isōrō ga Sekai wo Shōaku Shiteiru!	Tsuyoshi Nanajoh	Tsubame Nozomi	9

=== V ===
Title	Author	Illustrator	No. of volumes
Valkyrie Works	Manta Aisora	Hagane Tsurugi	1

=== W ===
Title	Author	Illustrator	No. of volumes
Warelf Online	Mamoru Nagamono	Umiko	1
War Generation: Hōkago Bōeitai	Hideki Kakinuma	Hōden Eizō	1
Wasureenu Majo no Monogatari	Usa Naruharu	Kamo Kamen	2
White Album 2: Yuki ga Tsumugu Senritsu	Masaya Tsukishima; Leaf (Original Creator)	Takeshi Nakamura; Keiichirō Katsura	6

=== Y ===
Title	Author	Illustrator	No. of volumes
Yggdrasill	Ikumi Mizuki	Halsame Tsubaki	1

=== Z ===
Title	Author	Illustrator	No. of volumes
Zoa Hunter	Jun'ichi Ōsako	Bunbun	6
