= Sexiled =

Japanese light novel series

- Sexiled: My Sexist Party Leader Kicked Me Out, So I Teamed Up With a Mythical Sorceress!
- First light novel volume cover

女だから、とパーティを追放されたので伝説の魔女と最強タッグを組みました！ (Onna dakara, to Party o Tsuihou Sareta no de Densetsu no Majo to Saikyou Tag wo Kumimashita)
- Genre: Yuri
- Novel series
- Written by: Ameko Kaeruda
- Published by: Shōsetsuka ni Narō
- Original run: August 2, 2018 – April 22, 2019
- Light novel
- Written by: Ameko Kaeruda
- Illustrated by: Miya Kazumoto
- Published by: Overlap
- English publisher: NA: J-Novel Club
- Imprint: Overlap Novels
- Original run: February 25, 2019 – August 25, 2019
- Volumes: 2
- Manga
- Written by: Ameko Kaeruda
- Illustrated by: Yomiya Ririura
- Published by: Shogakukan
- Magazine: Sunday Webry
- Original run: April 12, 2021 – July 8, 2024
- Volumes: 6

Sexiled: My Sexist Party Leader Kicked Me Out, So I Teamed Up With a Mythical Sorceress! (女だから、とパーティを追放されたので伝説の魔女と最強タッグを組みました！, S Onna dakara, to Party o Tsuihou Sareta no de Densetsu no Majo to Saikyou Tag wo Kumimashita), is a Japanese yuri light novel series, written by Ameko Kaeruda and illustrated by Miya Kazumoto. It was serialized online between August 2018 and April 2019 on the user-generated novel publishing website Shōsetsuka ni Narō. It was acquired by Overlap, who published both volumes of the light novel in 2019 under their Overlap Novels imprint. It is licensed in North America by J-Novel Club. A manga adaptation by Yomiya Ririura was serialized on Shogakukan's Sunday Webry manga website from April 2021 to July 2024.

== Synopsis ==
Tanya Artemiciov is a talented Mage adventurer who is kicked from her party by its sexist leader. Upset by this turn of events, Tanya goes to the wasteland to blow off some steam, however in the process she inadvertently frees a mythical Sorceress named Laplace who has been sealed away for 300 years. The two decide to work together so that Tanya can get her revenge on her old party by beating them in the upcoming adventurer tournament.

== Media ==
=== Light novels ===
J-Novel Club first announced it had licensed Sexiled in North America for a digital release in August 2019, However, on November 16, 2019, during J-Novel Club's Anime NYC panel, it was announced that they would also be releasing print editions of Sexiled and My Next Life as a Villainess: All Routes Lead to Doom!. The light novel was inspired by the manipulation of test scores at Tokyo Medical University, which was brought to light in August 2018, where in it was revealed that the university had deliberately lowered entrance exam scores of female applicants by 10-20% in order to keep the number of female students below 30%.

No.	Original release date	Original ISBN	English release date	English ISBN
1	February 25, 2019	978-4-86554-452-7	October 5, 2019 (e-book); June 2, 2020 (paperback)	978-1-7183-6640-4
2	August 25, 2019	978-4-86554-536-4	December 14, 2019 (e-book); September 1, 2020 (paperback)	978-1-7183-6641-1

=== Manga ===
A manga adaptation by Yomiya Ririura was serialized on Shogakukan's Sunday Webry manga website from April 12, 2021, to July 8, 2024.

No.	Release date	ISBN
1	October 12, 2021	978-4-09-850770-2
2	May 12, 2022	978-4-09-851133-4
3	December 12, 2022	978-4-09-851430-4
4	July 12, 2023	978-4-09-852535-5
5	January 12, 2024	978-4-09-853078-6
6	August 8, 2024	978-4-09-853470-8

== Reception ==
Sexiled has received positive reviews, with Kim Morrissy from Anime News Network giving it the series an overall A grade. Morrissy praised its "Breezy prose, witty dialogue, a fun yet deeply honest look at gender discrimination issues". Erica Friedman of Yuricon noted in her review that while the revenge aspect of the plot is satisfying, "What made this book so wonderful was the humor, the teamwork, the humanity of it."

The series has been featured on BookWalker's top-selling light novels for 2019 and 2020.

== See also ==
- The One. Later On..., another light novel series by the same illustrator
