= Suppose a Kid from the Last Dungeon Boonies Moved to a Starter Town =

Japanese light novel series

- First light novel volume cover

たとえばラストダンジョン前の村の少年が序盤の街で暮らすような物語 (Tatoeba Rasuto Danjon Mae no Mura no Shōnen ga Joban no Machi de Kurasu Yō na Monogatari)
- Genre: Adventure, fantasy comedy
- Light novel
- Written by: Toshio Satō
- Illustrated by: Nao Watanuki
- Published by: SB Creative
- English publisher: NA: Yen Press
- Imprint: GA Bunko
- Original run: February 15, 2017 – July 14, 2022
- Volumes: 15
- Manga
- Written by: Toshio Satō
- Illustrated by: Hajime Fusemachi
- Published by: Square Enix
- English publisher: NA: Square Enix
- Magazine: Gangan Online
- Original run: September 28, 2017 – August 31, 2023
- Volumes: 12
- Manga

Tatoeba Last Dungeon Mae no Mura no Shōnen ga Joban no Machi no Shokudō de Hataraku Nichijō Monogatari
- Written by: Toshio Satō
- Illustrated by: Souchuu
- Published by: Square Enix
- Magazine: Monthly Shōnen Gangan
- Original run: January 11, 2020 – February 12, 2022
- Volumes: 4
- Anime television series
- Directed by: migmi
- Written by: Deko Akao
- Music by: Michiru
- Studio: Liden Films
- Licensed by: Crunchyroll: SA/SEA: Muse Communication
- Original network: AT-X, Tokyo MX, BS11, AbemaTV, SUN
- Original run: January 4, 2021 – March 22, 2021
- Episodes: 12

Suppose a Kid from the Last Dungeon Boonies Moved to a Starter Town (Japanese: たとえばラストダンジョン前の村の少年が序盤の街で暮らすような物語, Hepburn: Tatoeba Rasuto Danjon Mae no Mura no Shōnen ga Joban no Machi de Kurasu Yō na Monogatari), abbreviated as LasDan (ラスダン, Rasudan), is a Japanese light novel series written by Toshio Satō and illustrated by Nao Watanuki. SB Creative released fifteen volumes under their GA Bunko label from February 2017 to July 2022. The light novel is licensed in North America by Yen Press and the English translation is done by Andrew Cunningham. A manga adaptation with art by Hajime Fusemachi was serialized online from September 2017 to August 2023 via Square Enix's online manga magazine Gangan Online. It has been collected in twelve tankōbon volumes. An anime television series adaptation by Liden Films aired from January to March 2021.

== Plot ==
Lloyd Belladonna was raised in Conron, a town where everyone is extraordinarily powerful. Unable to keep up, he moves to Azami to become a soldier and make a name for himself. His intense training has given him incredible strength, speed, magic, and other talents, but his crippling self-esteem issues from being overshadowed his entire life prevent him from seeing how amazing he truly is. For example, he can often defeat monsters with one blow, but does not see this as special since his villagers treat these monsters like bugs. He goes through life oblivious to his talents and the various girls who become attracted to him.

== Characters ==
Lloyd Belladonna (ロイド・ベラドンナ, Roido Beradonna)
Voiced by: Yumiri Hanamori (Japanese); Erica Schroeder (English)
Lloyd is a teenage boy from the legendary town of Kunlun who left to become a soldier in the kingdom's army. In his village, he is known as a weakling who cannot perform any typical jobs to the "normal" expected level. However, the standards of this town, in the most dangerous region of the world, are incredibly skewed and truthfully he is terrifyingly powerful by outside standards. He is kind and generous, eager to help and very humble. He excels at cooking and cleaning, but cannot be convinced of his true power.
Marie (マリー, Marī)
Voiced by: Ai Kayano (Japanese); Krystal LaPorte (English)
A teenage witch who lives in the east side slums of the capital of Azami, selling potions to the residents, usually for information rather than money on account of the poverty in the east side. She is a former pupil of Alka and secretly the missing princess of the kingdom, Maria Azami (マリア・アザミ).
Alka (アルカ, Aruka)
Voiced by: Natsumi Hioka (Japanese); Lindsay Sheppard (English)
The village chief of Kunlun Village. While she resembles a twelve-year-old girl, she is actually hundreds of years old, and an incredibly powerful magic user. She deliberately filled Lloyd's mind with stories of the army to convince him to leave. She secretly has a crush on him and frequently teleports to the capital to check up on him.
Selen Hemein (セレン・ヘムアエン, Seren Hemuaen)
Voiced by: Madoka Asahina (Japanese); Alexis Tipton (English)
Also known as the "Cursed Belt Princess". Daughter of a noble, Selen was cursed as a child by a magic belt that wrapped tightly around her head and could not be removed by any known magic. This accident led to scandal and shame to the nobility. She desperately developed her strength on account of a claim that power greater than the belt would break it, and came to the capital to join the army and further hone her power. When Lloyd broke the curse on their first meeting, she developed a very powerful crush on him. She has a tendency to talk of herself and Lloyd as already being mutually in love and showing animosity toward those she perceives as rivals. It is later revealed that the belt is made from the skin of Vritra, a divine beast native to Kunlun, and protects the wearer from all evil.
Riho Flavin (リッホー・フレービン, Rihhō Furēbin)
Voiced by: Minami Tsuda (Japanese); Elizabeth Maxwell (English)
A mercenary with one arm. Her left arm has been replaced with a powerful mechanical prosthesis. She joined the army as part of an agreement with the military instructor Merthophan Dextro in exchange for having her criminal record expunged. She is constantly watching for ways to use others to her benefit.
Phyllo (フィロ, Firo)
Voiced by: Miku Itō (Japanese); Elsie Lovelock (English)
Allan Twein Lidcain (アラン・トウィーン・リドカイン, Aran Towiin Ridokain)
Voiced by: Seiichirō Yamashita (Japanese); Billy Kametz (English)
A student of noble background who looks down on Selen as the "Cursed Belt Princess", fearing her presence could damage his own status. After being helped by Lloyd during Abaddon's attack, he assists in getting Lloyd enrolled at the academy. He looks up to Lloyd's strength and declared himself as his student.
Shōma (ショウマ)
Voiced by: Sōma Saitō (Japanese); Nazeeh Tarsha (English)
Merthophan (メルトファン, Merutofan)
Voiced by: Satoshi Hino (Japanese); Doug Erholtz (English)
An instructor at the Azami military academy who scouted several of the new students. He wanted to start a war to avenge his village, and manipulated the king into doing so, before instead being controlled by the king, at the time possessed by the Demon Lord Abaddon. After the Demon Lord's defeat, Merthophan is sentenced to work near Kunlun with Alka.
Choline (コリン, Korin)
Voiced by: M.A.O (Japanese); Jad Saxton (English)
Mena (メナ)
Voiced by: Haruka Tomatsu (Japanese); Felicia Valenti (English)
Chrome (クロム, Kuromu)
Voiced by: Taketora (Japanese); Justice Washington (English)
A former bodyguard for Marie who retired and opened a café after her disappearance. He hired Lloyd after Lloyd initially failed his entry exam, before returning to the military as a teacher after the Demon Lord Abaddon was defeated, to cover for Merthophan.
Rol Calcife (ロール, Rōru)
Voiced by: Naomi Shindō (Japanese); Michele Knotz (English)
Micona (ミコナ, Mikona)
Voiced by: Natsumi Fujiwara (Japanese); Dawn M. Bennett (English)
Sou (ソウ, Sō)
Voiced by: Takaya Hashi^{Ep. 6 credits} (Japanese); R. Bruce Elliott (English)
Vritra (ヴリトラ, Vuritora)
Voiced by: Katsuyuki Konishi^{Ep. 9 credits} (Japanese); Christopher Sabat (English)
Eug (レナ・ユーグ, Rena Yūgu)
Voiced by: Yūko Sanpei (Japanese); Leah Clark (English)

== Media ==
=== Light novel ===
No.	Original release date	Original ISBN	English release date	English ISBN
1	February 15, 2017	978-4-7973-9029-2	November 5, 2019	978-1-9753-0566-6
2	June 15, 2017	978-4-7973-9266-1	May 26, 2020	978-1-9753-0623-6
3	September 15, 2017	978-4-7973-9385-9	September 22, 2020	978-1-9753-1304-3
4	February 15, 2018	978-4-7973-9553-2	December 15, 2020	978-1-9753-1329-6
5	July 14, 2018	978-4-7973-9752-9	March 23, 2021	978-1-9753-1331-9
6	January 15, 2019	978-4-7973-9933-2	June 29, 2021	978-1-9753-1333-3
7	July 12, 2019	978-4-8156-0016-7	October 5, 2021	978-1-9753-1335-7
8	November 14, 2019	978-4-8156-0468-4	January 11, 2022	978-1-9753-1847-5
9	April 14, 2020	978-4-8156-0510-0; 978-4-8156-0509-4 (SE)	May 17, 2022	978-1-9753-1849-9
10	September 11, 2020	978-4-8156-0777-7	October 4, 2022	978-1-9753-4047-6
11	January 14, 2021	978-4-8156-0924-5	January 17, 2023	978-1-9753-4049-0
12	March 12, 2021	978-4-8156-0960-3	April 18, 2023	978-1-9753-4051-3
13	September 14, 2021	978-4-8156-0990-0	September 19, 2023	978-1-9753-7482-2
14	March 12, 2022	978-4-8156-1244-3	February 20, 2024	978-1-9753-7906-3
15	July 14, 2022	978-4-8156-1245-0	July 23, 2024	978-1-9753-8903-1

=== Manga ===
A manga adaptation with art by Hajime Fusemachi was serialized in Square Enix's online manga magazine Gangan Online from September 28, 2017, to August 31, 2023. Square Enix is also publishing the series in English.

A spin-off manga with art by Souchuu titled Tatoeba Last Dungeon Mae no Mura no Shōnen ga Joban no Machi no Shokudō de Hataraku Nichijō Monogatari was serialized in Square Enix's Monthly Shōnen Gangan magazine from January 11, 2020, to February 12, 2022, and collected into four volumes.

==== Volume list ====
===== Suppose a Kid from the Last Dungeon Boonies Moved to a Starter Town =====
No.	Original release date	Original ISBN	English release date	English ISBN
1	February 13, 2018	978-4-75-755620-1	March 24, 2020	978-1-64-609037-2
2	July 12, 2018	978-4-75-755778-9	June 23, 2020 (digital); August 25, 2020 (print)	978-1-64-609038-9
3	February 2, 2019	978-4-75-756002-4	December 22, 2020	978-1-64-609039-6
4	September 12, 2019	978-4-75-756290-5	June 22, 2021	978-1-64-609054-9
5	April 11, 2020	978-4-75-756554-8	December 14, 2021	978-1-64-609055-6
6	September 12, 2020	978-4-75-756842-6	October 25, 2022	978-1-64-609119-5
7	December 11, 2020	978-4-75-757003-0	January 24, 2023	978-1-64-609154-6
8	March 12, 2021	978-4-75-757152-5	April 25, 2023	978-1-64-609155-3
9	September 10, 2021	978-4-75-757471-7	July 25, 2023	978-1-64-609172-0
10	April 12, 2022	978-4-75-757880-7	October 3, 2023	978-1-64-609218-5
11	November 11, 2022	978-4-75-758253-8	February 20, 2024	978-1-64-609251-2
12	October 12, 2023	978-4-75-758850-9	October 22, 2024	978-1-64-609264-2

===== Tatoeba Last Dungeon Mae no Mura no Shōnen ga Joban no Machi no Shokudō de Hataraku Nichijō Monogatari =====
No.	Release date	ISBN
1	December 11, 2020	978-4-75-757002-3
2	March 12, 2021	978-4-75-757151-8
3	September 10, 2021	978-4-75-757472-4
4	April 12, 2022	978-4-75-757881-4

=== Anime ===
An anime television series adaptation was announced during a livestream for the "GA Fes 2019" event on October 19, 2019. The series was animated by Liden Films and directed by migmi, with Deko Akao handling series composition, Makoto Iino designing the characters, and Michiru composing the series' music. The series was originally set to premiere in October 2020, but was delayed and it aired from January 4 to March 22, 2021. The opening theme song is "Suppose It's the Magic of Courage" (たとえばそれは勇気の魔法, Tatoeba Sore wa Yūki no Mahō) performed by Haruka Yamazaki, while the ending theme song is "I'mpossible?" performed by Luce Twinkle Wink☆.

Funimation acquired the series and streamed it on its website in North America, the British Isles, Mexico, and Brazil, in Europe through Wakanim, and in Australia and New Zealand through AnimeLab. Following Sony's acquisition of Crunchyroll, the series was moved to Crunchyroll. In Southeast Asia and South Asia, Muse Communication licensed the series and streamed it on its Muse Asia YouTube channel and Bilibili in Southeast Asia.

No.	Title (Note: All English titles are taken from Funimation.)	Directed by	Written by	Original release date
1	"Suppose a Kid from the Last Dungeon Boonies moved to a starter town?" Transliteration: "Tatoeba Rasuto Danjon Mae no Mura no Shōnen ga Joban no Machi de Kurasu Yō na Monogatari" (Japanese: たとえばラストダンジョン前の村の少年が序盤の街で暮らすような物語)	Seo Hye-Jin	Deko Akao	January 4, 2021
Lloyd lives in Kunlun Village with his grandfather and older brother. Years later, he travels to Azami Kingdom where he will be staying with the East Side Witch, Marie, while he takes the soldier exam. Marie almost refuses until he produces a magic crystal, which summons his village chief, Alka, Marie's former master. Alka tells Marie to look after Lloyd. Marie learns that Lloyd, who considers himself to be weak, is actually very powerful. Lloyd defeats a monster attacking Selen, a young girl with a belt around her head. Selen reveals the belt was cursed onto her as a child and was told only great strength would remove it. However, after meeting Lloyd, the belt simply falls off, causing her to fall in love with him. Before the exam, Riho, an ex-criminal turned military cadet, senses Lloyd is extremely dangerous. Selen shows extreme jealousy when Lloyd talks to Riho. Marie reveals Kunlun is by a still undefeated dungeon containing the most powerful monsters in the country, so while Lloyd is considered weak by people from his village, he is probably one of the strongest humans in the world. After the exam, Lloyd's name is not listed amongst the candidates.
2	"Suppose a majestic lion showed up to the petting section of a zoo and dozed off?" Transliteration: "Tatoeba Hyakujū no Ō ga Dōbutsuen no Fureai Kōnā ni Nekorogaru Yō na Bachigai-kan" (Japanese: たとえば百獣の王が動物園のふれあいコーナーに寝転がるような場違い感)	Yasushi Muroya	Deko Akao	January 11, 2021
Selen, Riho, and officers Merthohan and Choline are confused as to why Lloyd failed to become a military cadet. It is announced that Princess Maria is still missing. Lloyd gets a part-time job at a café owned by Chrome, an ex-royal guard. Choline discovers Lloyd failed his written test because he wrote ancient runes. Selen decides to find Marie and have Lloyd admitted to the academy as her reward. Lloyd tells Alka and Marie he will work at the café until the next exam. Marie tells Alka that her father, King Azami, is being controlled by someone planning war with the Jiou Empire, but Alka refuses to help as people from Kunlun are too powerful and only provide aid in situations like apocalyptic disasters. Selen gets in a fight with fellow noble student Allan Lidocaine and her cursed belt, which she now wears at her waist, protects her, which she takes as another sign Lloyd is her soulmate. When Lloyd arrives, Selen declares he is her champion and will fight Allan for her. Allan agrees, thinking he can impress the officers. Marie swoops in and steals Lloyd away with wind magic before he can kill Allan by accident.
3	"Suppose someone told you they'd do anything for you, which you appreciate but you know you should push back?" Transliteration: "Tatoeba "Nan Demo Shimasu!" to Iwarerya Warui Ki wa Shinai Kedo Soko wa Damette Iwanakya Ikenai Yō na Jirenma" (Japanese: たとえば「なんでもします！」と言われりゃ悪い気はしないけどそこはダメって言わなきゃいけないようなジレンマ)	Michiru Itabisashi	Deko Akao	January 18, 2021
Lloyd mistakenly assumes Marie saved him from Allan. Chrome then confronts Marie, who he recognizes as the missing Princess Maria. Marie reveals that whoever is manipulating her father will likely have him declare war at a summit in three days and requests Chrome's assistance. Selen, searching for Princess Maria, decides to ask Marie for help, only to furiously realize Lloyd lives with her. Just as Marie is about reveal her true identity, Lloyd blurts out his mistaken belief Marie is the hero who saves people in secret. Taking advantage of this, Marie claims he is a weakling. Once Lloyd leaves, Marie asks Selen and Riho for their help. Alka praises Marie for keeping Lloyd out of it, but then punishes her for dropping her magic crystal down a well. Based on information gathered from assassins searching for Marie, Chrome accuses Merthohan of cursing the king, which he admits is true. As Marie, Riho and Selen arrive, the king suddenly reveals he is possessed by Demon Lord Abbadon and he was actually controlling Merthohan. Marie chases after her father, hoping to use one of Lloyd's runes to free him from possession, but he breaks her hand containing the rune.
4	"Suppose the protagonist of a novel led the story to a grand finale?" Transliteration: "Tatoeba Shōsetsu no Shujinkō ga Monogatari o Daidan'en ni Michibiita Yō na Asa" (Japanese: たとえば小説の主人公が物語を大団円に導いたような朝)	Michiru Itabisashi; Yasuaki Fujii	Deko Akao	January 25, 2021
Marie realizes a Demon Lord is something Lloyd is allowed to fight. Lloyd finds Allan hiding from Abbadon's locust monsters and Allan is encouraged to act like a real soldier and fight. Alka later destroys the monsters for ruining her romantic plans for Lloyd. Chrome, Riho and Selen fight Merthohan, who is turned into a locust hybrid. Lloyd arrives and while appealing to Merthohan's desire to be a true soldier, defeats him with a slap. Marie then asks him to clean the dirt from the king's body, which he does, not knowing his cleansing rune is so powerful it purges Abbadon from the king's body. The next day, Lloyd's brother Shōma arrives but disappears before Alka sees him. Chrome rejoins the army while Merthohan is exiled to Kunlun. With the king cured, Marie decides to remain a witch. Grateful that Lloyd helped him, Allan declares Lloyd his master and gets him admitted to the academy. Alka clashes with Selen over Lloyd and realizes her belt is a powerful protective relic that went missing from Kunlun years ago. Annoyed with everyone, Marie banishes Alka back to Kunlun through her crystal and sends Lloyd and his friends to school.
5	"Suppose someone took flirtation advice on a magazine way too seriously?" Transliteration: "Tatoeba Zasshi ni Notte Ita Moteru Kudoki Monku o Ma ni Ukete Shimatta Yō na Daitan'na Sasoi-ppuri" (Japanese: たとえば雑誌に載っていたモテる口説き文句を真に受けてしまったような大胆な誘いっぷり)	Tatsuji Yamazaki	Yoriko Tomita	February 1, 2021
Marie takes Lloyd on a job where he draws a Holy Sword from a stone. Choline later announces the inter-academy match against Rokujou Academy. Selen and Lloyd decide to learn healing magic. Marie meets sisters Mena and Phyllo of Rokujou Academy, who are searching for Riho. Sensing Lloyd's powerful aura, Phyllo instinctively attacks him. Alka then turns Marie into a butterfly. Rol, Rokujou's headmistress, tries to make Riho come home, but Riho angrily refuses. Seeing Riho upset, Lloyd asks Riho on a date thanks to Marie's advice. Riho reveals Rol gave her the prosthetic Mithril arm, but Riho realized Mithril drains magic and Rol only wanted the arm to draw a holy sword, so she ran away. The next day, Micona, a second year student, tries to outdo Lloyd, but is instantly defeated. Micona goes to Marie for healing as she has a crush on her, only to realize Lloyd lives with her. As the matches begin, Riho swears to defeat Rol, just as it is announced the grand prize is the Holy Sword Lloyd previously pulled out. Micona is later seen telling her story to Shōma.
6	"Suppose the obviously superior contestant wins, but the clearly inferior contestant also wins?" Transliteration: "Tatoeba Zettai Katsu Darōtte Yatsu ga Katte, Zettai Makeru Darōtte Yatsu mo Katsu Yō na Kōryūjiai no Kaishi" (Japanese: たとえば絶対勝つだろうってやつが勝って、絶対負けるだろうってやつも勝つような交流試合の開始)	Kōtarō Miyake	Yoriko Tomita	February 8, 2021
Selen duels Phyllo, but is disqualified when she physically strikes Phyllo. In the next match, Mena tries to use her water magic against Lloyd, but he ultimately wins. Later, Rol removes Riho's prosthetic. Riho then begins chanting a high level water spell, causing Rol to pass out from fear. Rol wakes up furious and learns a witch, who lives with a young man, retrieved the holy sword. Deciding to force the witch to become her ally, she orders Phyllo to take the young man hostage, but Phyllo misunderstands and steals Alka's magic crystal. Lloyd, believing Marie has been kidnapped, rushes to find her. Phyllo demands Lloyd duel her to the death, but he insists they arm wrestle. Lloyd defeats Phyllo, who decides she wants to marry him. Alka appears from her crystal and punishes Rol following an insult. Allan saves Rol from the river and is unintentionally credited with saving the town. Riho visits Rol in hospital and Rol remembers she only became so ambitious because she wanted to help Riho rebuild their failing orphanage. Meanwhile, an unknown magician is revealed to have been manipulating Rol's memories to get the sword so he can defeat the dungeon in Kunlun.
7	"Suppose it's looking like you need to clean up the mess, and you kind of saw it coming?" Transliteration: "Tatoeba Fuan ga nai Wake de wa Nakatta ga Yappari Shirinugui o Suru no wa Jibun ni Nari Sō na Yokan" (Japanese: たとえば不安がないわけではなかったがやっぱり尻拭いをするのは自分になりそうな予感)	Seo Hye-Jin	Yū Satō	February 15, 2021
Lloyd takes a job as a cleaner at a hotel. The owner, Coba, admits something keeps attacking his workers. A notoriously difficult guest, Lord Threonine, arrives and asks Lloyd's opinion on a cypress forest his family takes care of and is impressed with Lloyd's answer. Later, Threonine meets one of Coba's maids, Kikyou, and shares his suspicions that Coba is illegally raising treants in the forest. He also shares his is annoyance that local lord wants his daughter to marry his son, Allan. As treants are linked to Demon Lords, Kikyou accuses Lloyd of possession due to his abilities and is given an antidote by Threonine. She mixes it into Lloyd's tea, but it is accidentally drunk by an outraged Coba. Kikyou flees and Coba starts to suspect Kikyou and Threonine are behind the attacks on his workers. Riho later appears as a guest as does Selen and her father, the lord wanting her to marry Threonine's son. However, Selen is overjoyed when Lloyd appears instead, as Threonine asked Lloyd to stand in for Allan after he had passed out. Selen immediately suggests she and Lloyd go on a date so they can investigate the local area.
8	"Suppose you were just pretending to be lovers, but somehow the pretense transforms into the real deal!" Transliteration: "Tatoeba Engi de mo Koibito no Furi o Shite Itara Honki ni Natchau Koto mo Arimasu wa yo ne! Na Jōkyō" (Japanese: たとえば演技でも恋人のふりをしていたら本気になっちゃうこともありますわよねっ！な状況)	Yasushi Muroya	Yū Satō	February 22, 2021
Shōma arrives with a delivery of firebombs. Kikyou is determined to expel Lloyd's treant and convinces him to have an antidote massage, but is forced to flee when Selen sees her trying to stick the antidote down Lloyd's pants. Lloyd goes to a hot spring, not realizing it is mixed bathing, and Selen is furious when her lewd plans are interrupted by the arrival of Riho, Marie, Alka, Phyllo and Mena. Kikyou meets Minoki, Threonine's secretary, who reveals he is responsible for the treants. The Demon Lord of Trees, Erkling, takes over Minoki. Lloyd easily deals with the treants while Erkling heads for the hotel. Selen's father reveals he has been legally dealing in treants with Shōma. Lloyd's friends hold Erkling back with the firebombs while Lloyd tears out Erkling's demon seed, returning Minoki to normal. Alka is later confronted by Shōma, who leaves after revealing he has been working with one of her enemies since the holy sword was removed. Selen's father cancels her arranged marriage and lets her continue her career as a soldier. Alka tries to con Lloyd into giving her a massage for her hard work, but Lloyd inadvertently performs a German Suplex instead.
9	"Suppose you visited an early dungeon but encountered three final bosses?" Transliteration: "Tatoeba Joban no Danjon ni Dekaketeittara Rasubosu ga Sannin Ita Yō na Tenkai" (Japanese: たとえば序盤のダンジョンに出かけて行ったらラスボスが3人いたような展開)	Yasuaki Fujii	Yoriko Tomita	March 1, 2021
Micona meets Shōma and a priest named Father Sou. Meanwhile, the king asks Lloyd and his friends to defeat a giant snake in a new dungeon. Sou decides to defeat the snake first. Alka enters the dungeon to find Sou. Marie finds Micona in the dungeon infected by a treant. Lloyd fights Micona but is hurt when he protects Selen and Phyllo. Micona claims friends have made him weak, but Lloyd claims they helped him become a real soldier and he defeats her. The snake is awakened and reveals he is Vritra, Guardian of Kunlun and a source of Alka's power. Sou appears and kills Vritra, but Vritra reveals Selen's belt is made from his skin and he avoids death by passing his soul into it. Alka admits she inadvertently created it years prior. Sou teleports away, promising to unlock Kunlun's dungeon. The dungeon then collapses so Alka teleports everyone to safety. Due to a mix up, Allan is credited with defeating Vritra, so the king grants him the title Dragon Slayer. Lloyd realizes Sou is the name of the hero in a Kunlun fairy tale. Alka later kidnaps Selen and Vritra, claiming she needs them in Kunlun.
10	"Suppose someone suggested taking a short trip to Neverland, or something impossible like that?" Transliteration: "Tatoeba "Nebārando ni Ippaku Futsuka Shite Kuru" Nami ni Arienai Densetsu no Mura e no Kikyō" (Japanese: たとえば「ネバーランドに一泊二日してくる」並みにありえない伝説の村への帰郷)	Tatsuji Yamazaki	Yoriko Tomita	March 8, 2021
To celebrate peace between Azami and Jiou, an exhibition match is arranged. Meanwhile, Alka, Selen, and Vritra are accompanied to Kunlun by Lloyd, Marie and everyone else except for Allan, who is forced to fight in the exhibition match. Lloyd and company are joined by Eug, a Dwarven resident of Kunlun where they are surprised to see how overpowered the villagers are. Choline and Chrome visit Merthophan and are disappointed he has no plans to return. Riho finds out that the people of Kunlun consider legendary dragons to be common pests, while Selen's marriage plans are foiled when several children turn her marriage licences into weapons to drive the dragon away. Later, Selen is furious when all the girls manage to impress Lloyd's relatives except her. Elsewhere, Alka and Eug discuss Sou, Vritra in particular, revealing they erased part of Vritra's memory for an unexplained reason. Merthophan reveals to Marie he was given a mysterious egg by a travelling merchant, after which the king became possessed, and though Merthophan is unable to describe what the merchant looked like, he remembers the merchant used a particular phrase during their conversation that Marie has heard before.
11	"Suppose the villain starts appearing on and off like the middle part of a movie?" Transliteration: "Tatoeba Eiga no Chūban no Yō ni Akuyaku ga Chirachira Suru Kuraimakkusu Ippotemae" (Japanese: たとえば映画の中盤のように悪役がチラチラするクライマックス一歩手前)	Kazuki Yokoyama	Yū Satō	March 15, 2021
To ensure Alka keeps her powers, Vritra's body must be resurrected. Alka reveals that Kunlun's dungeon is actually a prison holding multiple Demon Lords, and the villagers are its guards. The prison also holds a mysterious power capable of affecting the entire world if misused, and the dungeon is in danger of being unlocked because Alka, being so absent-minded, forgot that Vritra was so important. Eug further reveals the key to the prison is the Holy Sword. Eug begins Vritra's resurrection into an egg, rendering Alka powerless until it hatches. Once alone with Alka, Eug betrays her, revealing that she waited for Alka to be powerless before beginning her plan to open the dungeon herself. She next sends Lloyd to search for Alka, trapping him in Kunlun while Eug teleports everyone else back to Azami and permanently closes the portal. Riho visits Rol, who starts to remember things about the magician who altered her memories, sounding suspiciously like Eug, but Riho does not notice the significance. At the match, the king is accompanied by Shōma and Sou. Suspicious, Riho asks the king to cancel the match. Meanwhile, Lloyd locates Alka and frees her.
12	"Suppose a kid from the last dungeon boonies got used to life in a starter town?" Transliteration: "Tatoeba Rasuto Danjon Mae no Mura no Shōnen ga Joban no Machi de Kurasu to Konna Kaze ni Naru yo Nette Tenkai" (Japanese: たとえばラストダンジョン前の村の少年が序盤の街で暮らすとこんな風になるよねって展開)	migmi	Deko Akao	March 22, 2021
Alka uses a cannon to blast Lloyd back to Azami. Meanwhile, during the match, Sou suggests Azami and Jiou take over the world, but the king refuses. Merthophan arrives to fight Shōma, who admits the world is too boring, so he plans to start a war so Lloyd could become a hero. Sou reveals he is an artificial being created by Alka hundreds of years ago to save the world. However, after he completed his task, he was unable to die. Therefore, his plan is to have Lloyd kill him. Lloyd suddenly arrives and accuses Eug of faking Vritra's resurrection as a prank. Realizing Alka had to lie to Lloyd due to his naivete, Marie plays along and gets him to defeat Eug's creatures. Selen steals back Vritra's egg from Eug and verbally torments him into turning back into a belt. Alka arrives with her powers restored so Sou and Shōma leave now Lloyd is publicly a hero, taking a furious Eug with them. As Allen defended the king from Sou, he is once again given the credit for Lloyd's heroics. Lloyd continues living with Marie and his friends, still oblivious as to what really happened.

=== Video game ===
A free-to-play smartphone game developed for Android and iOS devices was released in Japan and traditional Chinese-speaking areas in 2021.
