= Kurihara (disambiguation) =

Kurihara is a Japanese city in Miyagi Prefecture, Japan.

Kurihara may also refer to:

- Kurihara (surname), including a list of people with the surname
- Kurihara District, Miyagi
- Kurihara Ruins, ruins of a dwelling in Nerima Ward, Tokyo, Japan

== See also ==
- Kurihara Den'en Railway Line
- Kurihara Tamachi Station, in Kurihara, Miyagi
