= Haruka Yamazaki =

Japanese voice actress and singer

- 山崎 はるか
- Born: June 27, 1991 (age 35); Kanagawa Prefecture, Japan
- Occupations: Voice actress; singer
- Years active: 2011–present
- Agent: Arts Vision
- Spouse: SHiN (m. 2023)
- Children: 1
- Musical career
- Genres: J-Pop; Anison
- Instrument: Vocals
- Years active: 2018-2023 (first contract)
- Label: NBCUniversal Entertainment Japan
- Website: yamazakiharuka.com

Haruka Yamazaki (山崎 はるか; born June 27, 1991 in Kanagawa Prefecture) is a Japanese voice actress and singer affiliated with Arts Vision. Yamazaki has had main roles in several anime shows including as Tomoyo Kanzaki in When Supernatural Battles Became Commonplace, Lilith Bristol in Absolute Duo, and Mero in Monster Musume.

In February 2023, Yamazaki married Granrodeo drummer SHiN.

In May 2024, it was revealed that Yamazaki was pregnant with her first child. On October 3, 2024, she gave birth to her first child, a son.

== Appearance ==
=== Television animation ===
==== 2011 ====
- YuruYuri as Eri's mother, girl student A, Hiro Takaoka, light music club member, student, visiting salesperson

==== 2012 ====
- Kokoro Connect as Kaidō
- YuruYuri♪♪ as Elementary school teacher, Eri's mother, ōmuro family's mother, TV newscaster
- Hayate the Combat Butler! Heaven Is a Place on Earth as Ruka Suirenji
- Hayate the Combat Butler! Can't Take My Eyes Off You as Ruka Suirenji
- Lagrange: The Flower of Rin-ne as Kana Nitta
- Say I Love You as boy, female student, Izumi

==== 2013 ====
- Vividred Operation as Mizuha Amagi
- Hayate the Combat Butler! Cuties as Ruka Suirenji
- High School DxD New as Aika Kiriyuu
- AKB0048 as audience A
- Oreshura as Satuki Aoba, Yoshino Suzumiya, Female Student
- Kotoura-san as girl
- The Pet Girl of Sakurasou as Hase Kanna
- Suisei no Gargantia as Parinuri
- Stella Women's Academy, High School Division Class C³ as Miyagi Motiduki
- Da Capo III
- A Certain Scientific Railgun as older sister, woman
- Nagi-Asu: A Lull in the Sea as Nachi Yanagi
- The Devil Is a Part-Timer! as Kaori Shouji, clerk
- Free! as girl
- White Album 2 as Aki Hukaya
- Love Live! as student A
- Ro-Kyu-Bu! as Yume Nakano

==== 2014 ====
- Haikyū!! as Natsu Hinata, Ms.Ono, student A
- When Supernatural Battles Became Commonplace as Tomoyo Kanzaki
- Black Butler as girl
- Your Lie in April as boy
- WIXOSS as female student
- Doraemon as clerk, girl

==== 2015 ====
- Absolute Duo as Lilith Bristol
- High School DxD BorN as Aika Kiriyuu
- Monster Musume as Meroune "Mero" Lorelei
- Mobile Suit Gundam: Iron-Blooded Orphans as Fuka Uno
- Crayon Shin-chan as sister's Kappa
- A Boring World Where the Concept of Dirty Jokes Doesn't Exist as boy named Yukiti
- Nintama Rantarō as princess

==== 2016 ====
- Danganronpa 3: The End of Hope's Peak High School as Natsumi Kuzuryu
- Keijo!!!!!!!! as girl
- Pandora in the Crimson Shell: Ghost Urn as gym uniform, caster
- Alderamin on the Sky as ninica, sia
- Bubuki/Buranki as child
- Heavy Object as cleaning service
- Magical Girl Raising Project as Yoshiko
- Monster Hunter Stories as Nariki

==== 2018 ====
- Magical Girl Site as Sarina Shizukume

==== 2019 ====
- My Roommate Is a Cat as Haru

==== 2021 ====
- Suppose a Kid from the Last Dungeon Boonies Moved to a Starter Town as Kikyou

=== Animation film ===
==== 2011 ====
- Hayate the Combat Butler! Heaven Is a Place on Earth as Ruka Suirenji

==== 2015 ====
- Pandora in the Crimson Shell: Ghost Urn as bunny girl, girl
- Love Live! The School Idol Movie as school idol

=== OVA ===
==== 2014 ====
- Hayate the Combat Butler as Ruka Suirenji

==== 2016 ====
- Monster Musume as Meroune "Mero" Lorelei

=== Web animation ===
==== 2016 ====
- Monster Strike as Mariko Kobayashi

=== Games ===
==== 2012 ====
- Waguruma as Neverell

==== 2013 ====
- The Idolmaster Million Live! as Mirai Kasuga
- Akiba's Trip: Undead & Undressed as Kati Räikkönen
- Vividred Operation as Mizuha Amagi

==== 2014 ====
- The Idolmaster One For All as Mirai Kasuga
- DYNAMIC CHORD feat.[reve parfait] as Ayu Suzuhara
- Majika★Majika as Airi Gekkyō

==== 2015 ====
- Omega Labyrinth as Aina Akemiya
- Photon Angels as Fee, Fran
- magicianwiz as Sophie Hernnet
- Crusader Quest as Sara
- White cat Project as Makina
- ja:しんぐんデストロ〜イ! as Mirai Kasuga
- Muramasa miyabi as Claws of Akane, Iwami Mitsumitsu
- Diss World as Bertha
- Tokyo Xanadu as Mitsuki Hokuto
- NET HIGH as Yuuko Megasawa
- Popup Story as Ōgami Kirara
- Monster Musume Online as Meroune "Mero" Lorelei
- Royal flush Heroes as Joyce Fraser

==== 2016 ====
- Akiba's Trip as Kati Raikkonen
- Collar×Malice as HANA
- Code:Realize as Shirley Gordon
- Vacuum tube dolls as Nancy
- Muramasa miyabi as Houzouin Insyun
- Tokyo Xanadu eX+ as Mitsuki Hokuto
- Drift Girls as Haruka Umitani
- Formation Girls as Kira Sasai

2017

- Azur Lane as USS Independence, KMS U-81

==== 2018 ====
- Bullet Girls Phantasia as Silvia Hortensia

==== 2019 ====
- Arknights as Grani

==== 2020 ====
- The Idolmaster: Starlit Season as Mirai Kasuga

==== 2021 ====
- Livestream: Escape from Hotel Izanami as Mio Ikoma

==== 2023 ====
- Honkai: Star Rail as Herta
- Sentimental Death Loop as Akane Higuchi

=== Drama CD ===
==== 2015 ====
- The Idolmaster Million Live! as Mirai Kasuga
- Millennial War Aigis as Kaguya

=== Radio ===
- Yamazaki Haruka "To the sky where we are running" (2011)
- THE IDOLM@STER MillionRADIO (2013 -, Live Niconico)
- When Supernatural Battles Became Radio (2014–2015, Internet Radio Station Onsen)
- Absolute Radio ~Couryou Academy Broadcasting Club~ (2014–2015, Internet Radio Station Onsen)
- Radio Dot AI, Yamazaki Haruka "Piyoshichi was said to be a pretty royal female voice actor but the enthusiast temperament inside of her disturbs." (2015, AG-ON and A&G+)
- Daily conversation with Monster Girls (2015, Internet Radio Station Onsen)
- Aimi and Haruka 2 years A group youth active club! (2016 -, Live Niconico)

=== Radio CD ===
==== 2015 ====
- THE IDOLM@STER MILLION RADIO! DJCD Vol.01
- Radio CD "Absolute Radio ~Couryou Academy Broadcasting Club~" Vol.1 – 2
- Radio CD "When Supernatural Battles Became Radio" Vol.1 – 2

=== TV program ===
- Animemasite (2015, TV Tokyo) MC

=== DVD•Blu-ray disc ===
- Hayate the Combat Butler×The World God Only Knows•Joint Concert2013 "Today, Full bloom Sakura color!" (2013)
- THE IDOLM@STER 8th ANNIVERSARY HOP! STEP!! FESTIV@L!!! (2014)
- THE IDOLM@STER M@STERS OF IDOL WORLD!!2014 (2014)
- THE IDOLM@STER MILLION LIVE! 1stLIVE HAPPY☆PERFORM@NCE!! Blu-ray (2014)
- Animelo Summer Live 2013 -FLAG NINE- 8.24 (2014)
- THE IDOLM@STER MILLION LIVE! 2ndLIVE ENJOY H@RMONY!! Live Blu-ray (2015)
- Animelo Summer Live 2014 (2015)
- THE IDOLM@STER M@STER OF IDOL WORLD!!2015 Live Blu-ray (2016)

=== Stage ===
- Sizu☆Geki Stride (2016)

=== Other contents ===
- AG Academy Ani☆Bun as China Haruno (2010)
- Kimino Tonaride Seisyun Tyu as Miu Kashiwagi (2011)

== Discography ==
=== Singles ===
Year	Song	Peak Oricon chart positions
2011	"Bokura, Kakeyuku Sora e"	43
2012	"Koi no Wana / Precious Nativity"	34
2018	"Zenzen Tomodachi"	32

=== Album ===
Year	Title	Peak Oricon chart positions
2019	"C'est Parti!!"	21
2021	"Mystère"	46
