= See You Tomorrow at the Food Court =

Japanese manga series

- First tankōbon volume cover, featuring Yamamoto (left) and Wada (right)

フードコートで、また明日。 (Fūdo Kōto de, Mata Ashita)
- Genre: Comedy drama; Slice of life
- Manga
- Written by: Shinichiro Nariie
- Published by: Kadokawa Shoten
- English publisher: NA: Yen Press
- Imprint: Kadokawa Comics
- Magazine: Comic Newtype
- Original run: March 10, 2020 – present
- Volumes: 2
- Anime television series
- Directed by: Kazuomi Koga
- Written by: Jukki Hanada
- Music by: Kana Utatane
- Studio: Atelier Pontdarc
- Licensed by: Crunchyroll; SEA: Medialink
- Original network: Tokyo MX, KBS Kyoto, SUN, TV Aichi, tbc, BS NTV, AT-X
- Original run: July 7, 2025 – August 11, 2025
- Episodes: 6

See You Tomorrow at the Food Court (Japanese: フードコートで、また明日。, Hepburn: Fūdo Kōto de, Mata Ashita) is a Japanese manga series written and illustrated by Shinichiro Nariie. It originally began as a webcomic published on the author's Twitter account in October 2019. It was later acquired by Kadokawa Shoten who began serializing it on their Comic Newtype website in March 2020. An anime television series adaptation produced by Atelier Pontdarc aired from July to August 2025.

== Plot ==
Wada and Yamamoto are perceived by their classmates as being a quiet rich girl who is an honor student and an intimidating gyaru, respectively. In actuality, the former is a huge fan of mobile games, while the latter enjoys urban legends. The two are also friends who hang out together at the food court every day after school.

== Characters ==
Wada (和田)
Voiced by: Hiyori Miyazaki
A seemingly straight-laced model student, Wada struggles academically and barely keeps her temper in check over petty issues, often using her time with Yamamoto to vent about the things that annoy her. Wada and Yamamoto have known each other for several years. However, they only became close when they were in junior high school. As they go to different high schools, their daily meetings at the food court are their only opportunity to catch up.
Yamamoto (山本)
Voiced by: Yoshino Aoyama
A supposedly carefree gyaru with flashy appearance, Yamamoto is actually a studious teen who humors her friend's complaints. She studies English in-between working part-time at a shop at the mall, and hopes to visit America one day.
Saito (斉藤, Saitō)
Voiced by: Saori Hayami
Wada's classmate who spends a lot of time on her makeup while at school. Wada refers to her as a "gorilla".
Duke Abel (エイベル公爵, Eiberu Kōshaku)
Voiced by: Jun Fukuyama
The SSR (super-super-rare) character from a gacha game that Wada claims to hate but admits she spent a lot of money to pull for him and his related merchandise.
Yamada (山田)
Voiced by: Rina Hidaka
A girl who has a similar appearance as Wada, to the point she earned the unwanted nickname of "Generic Wada". She is dating Takizawa, who also started dating her due to her similarity to Wada.
Takizawa (滝沢)
Voiced by: Yoshitsugu Matsuoka
Yamada's boyfriend. He was previously one of Wada's classmates in elementary school, nicknamed "Takizawa the Skirt-Flipper" by her for his juvenile habit.

== Media ==
=== Manga ===
Written and illustrated by Shinichiro Nariie, See You Tomorrow at the Food Court began as a webcomic published on the author's Twitter account on October 24, 2019. It was later acquired by Kadokawa Shoten who began serializing it on their Comic Newtype website on March 10, 2020. The series ended its first part on January 12, 2021, and began its second part on September 6, 2022. Kadokawa Shoten began releasing it in tankōbon volumes on March 10, 2021. Two volumes have been released as of March 31, 2025.

During their panel at Anime NYC 2021, Yen Press announced that they licensed the series for English publication.

| No. | Original release date | Original ISBN | North American release date | North American ISBN |
|---|---|---|---|---|
| 1 | March 10, 2021 | 978-4-04-109892-9 | August 23, 2022 | 978-1-97534-298-2 |
Chapters 1–15; To Be Continued... (Note: This is titled "To be continue..." in the Japanese version.); Bonus: Chapter 0
| 2 | March 31, 2025 | 978-4-04-114803-7 | — | — |
Re: Chapters 16–25

=== Anime ===
An anime television series adaptation was announced on December 13, 2024. It was produced by Atelier Pontdarc and directed by Kazuomi Koga, with series composition handled by Jukki Hanada, characters designed by Kyuta Sakai, and music composed by Kana Utatane. The series aired from July 7 to August 11, 2025, on Tokyo MX and other networks. The opening theme song is "Mikansei ni Matataite" (未完成に瞬いて; Twinkling Incompletely), performed by Oisicle Melonpan, while the ending theme song is "Tonari Awase" (となりあわせ; Side by Side), performed by Hiyori Miyazaki and Yoshino Aoyama as their respective characters. Crunchyroll is streaming the series. Medialink licensed the series in Southeast Asia and Oceania (except Australia and New Zealand) for streaming on Ani-One Asia's YouTube channel.

==== Episodes ====
| No. | Title | Directed by (Note: Production staff information is taken from the ending credits of each episode.) | Storyboarded by | Original release date |
|---|---|---|---|---|
| 1 | "WADA1234" | Kazuomi Koga | Kazuomi Koga & Kyūta Sakai | July 7, 2025 |
| 1 | "Nazca Lines Aliens"; Transliteration: "Nasuka Chijō-e Uchūjin" (Japanese: ナスカ地上絵 宇宙人) | Kazuomi Koga | Kazuomi Koga & Kyūta Sakai | July 7, 2025 |
| 1 | "psibola" | Kazuomi Koga | Kazuomi Koga & Kyūta Sakai | July 7, 2025 |
| 1 | "Change before you have to" | Kazuomi Koga | Kazuomi Koga & Kyūta Sakai | July 7, 2025 |
Wada meets up with her friend Yamamoto at a local shopping mall's food court. The two talk about a wide variety of topics together: aliens leaving crop circles, Wada feeling awkward about correcting a worker who almost overcharged her for chicken but did not, Wada getting the SSR character "Duke Abel" in her gacha game "Starlight Fantasy", Yamamoto studying English and working part-time in hopes of visiting America someday, and Wada getting irritated about a couple other ladies talking about pointless stuff while in line.
| 2 | "Rigged Crane Game"; Transliteration: "Kakuritsu-ki" (Japanese: 確率機) | Ken'ichi Kawamura | Ken'ichi Kawamura | July 14, 2025 |
| 2 | "Single-Ply Double Roll"; Transliteration: "Shinguru Ni-bai" (Japanese: シングル二倍) | Ken'ichi Kawamura | Ken'ichi Kawamura | July 14, 2025 |
| 2 | "Dream Theater"; Transliteration: "Yume-shibai" (Japanese: 夢芝居) | Ken'ichi Kawamura | Ken'ichi Kawamura | July 14, 2025 |
| 2 | "A Doggy Purpose"; Transliteration: "Boku no Wandā Raifu" (Japanese: ぼくのワンだーらいふ) | Ken'ichi Kawamura | Ken'ichi Kawamura | July 14, 2025 |
Wada spends 3,000 yen trying to get a Duke Abel figure from a crane game, which Yamamoto then wins on her first try. Wada talks trash about her "gorilla" classmate Saito and her habit of stealing toilet paper from the women's room. Wada gets immersed in spicy fanfiction about Duke Abel. Wada spots Yamamoto talking to a man at a shop, only to find she was talking to her boss to adjust her shift schedule. Wada and Yamamoto both try to eat a bowl of spicy ramen. Wada reminds Yamamoto of when they first met.
| 3 | "Breastibility"; Transliteration: "Nyūryoku" (Japanese: 乳力) | Satoshi Nakagawa | Satoshi Nakagawa | July 21, 2025 |
| 3 | "Naokin"; Transliteration: "Naokin" (Japanese: ナオキン) | Satoshi Nakagawa | Satoshi Nakagawa | July 21, 2025 |
| 3 | "Sisters"; Transliteration: "Shimai" (Japanese: 姉妹) | Satoshi Nakagawa | Satoshi Nakagawa | July 21, 2025 |
| 3 | "October 21st" Transliteration: "Jū-gatsu Nijūichi-nichi" (Japanese: 十月二十一日) | Satoshi Nakagawa | Satoshi Nakagawa | July 21, 2025 |
Wada voices her frustrations with learning the different kanji of various words. Yamamoto recommends her favorite YouTuber, an American-born man who talks about urban legends. Wada talks about her fear of animals, and how she would defend herself from being attacked by one. Wada shows up at the food court one day to find Yamamoto is not there, but Saito visits her instead and encourages her to learn more about Yamamoto. Wada then discovers that Saito is the writer of her favorite Duke Abel fanfiction.
| 4 | "Caramel Ribbon"; Transliteration: "Kyarameru Ribon" (Japanese: キャラメルリボン) | Ryūta Imaizumi | Ken'ichi Kawamura | July 28, 2025 |
| 4 | "We Live in Opposite Directions"; Transliteration: "Betsuhōkō da kedo" (Japanese: 別方向だけど) | Ryūta Imaizumi | Ken'ichi Kawamura | July 28, 2025 |
| 4 | "It Doesn't Stink"; Transliteration: "Kusaku wa nai" (Japanese: 臭くはない) | Ryūta Imaizumi | Ken'ichi Kawamura | July 28, 2025 |
| 4 | "Generic Wada"; Transliteration: "Ippanteki Wada" (Japanese: 一般的和田) | Ryūta Imaizumi | Ken'ichi Kawamura | July 28, 2025 |
As the summer sun bears down on the two girls, Wada talks about going to the dentist. Wada talks about stereotypical "girl" and "boy" reactions, which Yamamoto uses later to play a prank on her. Yamamoto tells Wada about a fight with her brother over their estranged father. Wada throws a tantrum until Yamamoto fixes her hairstyle. Yamamoto talks to a girl who looks similar to Wada, but is actually named Yamada, and is mad that her boyfriend Takizawa started dating her because he also mistook her for Wada at first. Yamamoto reluctantly offers some relationship advice to Yamada.
| 5 | "SSR" | Ryūta Imaizumi | Satoshi Nakagawa | August 4, 2025 |
| 5 | "So Annoying"; Transliteration: "Uzai" (Japanese: ウザい) | Ryūta Imaizumi | Satoshi Nakagawa | August 4, 2025 |
| 5 | "Arahama Beach"; Transliteration: "Arahama Kaisuiyoku-jō" (Japanese: 荒浜海水浴場) | Ryūta Imaizumi | Satoshi Nakagawa | August 4, 2025 |
The girls talk about putting honey on different foods and drawing on people with permanent marker. Yamamoto gets annoyed at Wada after she left with Takizawa the previous day without telling her, leading to an argument that causes them both to split up. After a few days, Wada returns with ice cream and the girls make up. The girls talk about struggling to keep up appearances compared to their real personalities, including their time as classmates in middle school, and how they first agreed to meet at the mall's food court shortly before graduation. The girls then talk about buying swimsuits for a beach trip.
| 6 | "Randy"; Transliteration: "Randi" (Japanese: ランディ) | Ken'ichi Kawamura | Ken'ichi Kawamura | August 11, 2025 |
| 6 | "Gorilla Tape"; Transliteration: "Gorira Tēpu" (Japanese: ゴリラテープ) | Ken'ichi Kawamura | Ken'ichi Kawamura | August 11, 2025 |
| 6 | "Toxic Fan"; Transliteration: "Yakkai" (Japanese: 厄介) | Ken'ichi Kawamura | Ken'ichi Kawamura | August 11, 2025 |
| 6 | "See You Tomorrow at the Food Court"; Transliteration: "Fūdo Kōto de, Mata Ashita." (Japanese: フードコートで、また明日。) | Ken'ichi Kawamura | Ken'ichi Kawamura | August 11, 2025 |
Wada is in tears after finding out Starlight Fantasy is about to hit end of service, taking her beloved Duke Abel with it. Yamamoto then recommends her a male long-haired YouTuber named Randy. Wada tests out product recommendation searches through her phone, with strange results. Wada is afraid of losing a bet with Yamamoto, and calls Saito to be a judge, but ends up angering her. Wada can barely hold back her emotions, both positive and negative, about Randy. Yamamoto and Wada act like a couple to drive away Yamada and Takizawa. Wada compliments Saito's new makeup. Yamamoto and Wada agree to meet up at the food court tomorrow.

== Reception ==
In a review for the anime adaptation, Bolts of Anime News Network gave it a B-minus. While they claimed that the series accomplished everything it wanted to and was positive of the relatable conversations, they thought it was overall a bit forgettable even at its best.
