= Absolute Duo =

Japanese light novel series and its adaptations

- First light novel volume cover featuring Julie Sigtuna.

アブソリュート・デュオ (Abusoryūto Duo)
- Genre: Action, fantasy, harem
- Light novel
- Written by: Takumi Hiiragiboshi
- Illustrated by: Yū Asaba
- Published by: Media Factory
- Imprint: MF Bunko J
- Original run: August 24, 2012 – July 25, 2016
- Volumes: 11
- Manga
- Written by: Takumi Hiiragiboshi
- Illustrated by: Shinichiro Nariie
- Published by: Media Factory
- English publisher: NA: Seven Seas Entertainment
- Magazine: Monthly Comic Alive
- Original run: April 27, 2013 – July 27, 2017
- Volumes: 4
- Manga

Absolute Duo Tea Party
- Written by: Takumi Hiiragiboshi
- Illustrated by: Toru Oiwaka
- Published by: Media Factory
- Magazine: Monthly Comic Alive
- Original run: October 27, 2014 – December 27, 2014
- Volumes: 1
- Anime television series
- Directed by: Atsushi Nakayama
- Produced by: Hidetake Komiya; Kazuo Ōnuki; Keisuke Kaminaga; Makoto Ito; Mika Shimizu; Uesama
- Written by: Takamitsu Kōno
- Music by: Atsushi Hirasawa
- Studio: Eight Bit
- Licensed by: AUS: Madman Entertainment; NA: Crunchyroll
- Original network: AT-X, Tokyo MX, Sun TV, KBS, TV Aichi, BS11
- Original run: January 4, 2015 – March 22, 2015
- Episodes: 12
- icon

Absolute Duo (Japanese: アブソリュート・デュオ, Hepburn: Abusoryūto Duo) is a Japanese light novel series by Takumi Hiiragiboshi with illustrations by Yū Asaba. Media Factory has published eleven volumes since 2012 under their MF Bunko J imprint. It has received two manga adaptations. A 12-episode anime television series adaptation by Eight Bit aired between January 4 and March 22, 2015.

== Plot ==
Tor Kokonoe enrolls in Koryo Academy, a high school where its students battle each other with weapons known as Blaze (焔牙/ブレイズ, Bureizu) as training to become future peacekeepers. The students must pass a battle during the qualification ceremony of the freshmen day in order to be enrolled in the academy. Although most students manifest their Blazes as melee weapons, Tor's ability manifests as a shield, making him an Irregular (イレギュラー, iregyurā). The school uses a special Duo system in which students are assigned partners. Tor is paired with Julie Sigtuna, a silver-haired girl from Scandinavia, and must share a room with her.

== Characters ==
=== Main ===
Tor Kokonoe (九重 透流, Kokonoe Tōru)
Voiced by: Yoshitsugu Matsuoka (Japanese); Ricco Fajardo (English)
Tor is the narrator of the Absolute Duo light novels. He enrolls in Koryo Academy with the hope of getting stronger so he can avenge the death of his younger sister Otoha (音羽). He is dubbed an Irregular for having a shield for a Blaze. He learns a powerful punch attack to use in conjunction with his Blaze. Julie sometimes refers to him as Thor. After spending some time with Julie, his goal switches from avenging his sister to becoming strong so that he can protect Julie. He obtains the Level 4 Sublimation which is "Aegis Desire".^{vol. 4}
Julie Sigtuna (ユリエ・シグトゥーナ, Yurie Shigutūna)
Voiced by: Nozomi Yamamoto (Japanese); Bryn Apprill (English)
Julie is a girl with red eyes and silver hair, styled in twin tails who becomes Tor's Duo partner at the academy. She takes a liking towards Tor and after some time she becomes his duo. She is from a village named Gimlé in Scandinavia. Her Blaze is a Sword Type, known as Twin Blades. The reason she came to Japan and enrolled at Koryo Academy is that she wants to get stronger to avenge her family's death; the scar on her back serves as a reminder of the incident. Because of this she seeks out Tor for help and to teach her his Final Move. Julie says "Yes" and "No" in Danish/Swedish/Norwegian: "Ja" (ヤー, Yā) and "Nej" (ナイ, Nai). One of her interesting features is her single strain of hair that stands and moves around
Tomoe Tachibana (橘 巴, Tachibana Tomoe)
Voiced by: Ayaka Suwa (Japanese); Whitney Rodgers (English)
Tor and Julie's classmate. She is described as a yamato nadeshiko: smart and talented and possesses a dignified atmosphere. She cares very much about the people who are close to her especially Miyabi, who despite being weak still chooses her to form a duo. She is very much into martial arts and Shogi. She can never tolerate idly work, so she always wakes others when they're about to be late. Being a vegetarian, she often gives Tor a plate of vegetables to maintain his stamina and power. Her Blaze is a Kusarigama.
Miyabi Hotaka (穂高 みやび, Hotaka Miyabi)
Voiced by: Ayaka Imamura (Japanese); Ashleigh Domangue (English)
Tor's classmate who forms a Duo with Tomoe. She is a buxom girl who tends to be shy around others. Her shyness, especially around boys, comes from how she used to be in an all-girls school before coming to Koryo Academy. She lacks stamina that keeps her from doing any physical activity for long periods of time. She eventually comes to realize she is in love with Tor and confesses, however, he instead turned her down telling her that he's too weak (having a flashback of his sister's death). Despite his rejection, she takes Tor´s words to her heart, even accepting Equipment Smith´s offer to become stronger, getting a Unit suit, despite having to fight against her friends. Her Blaze is a huge and heavy lance that is capable of doing large scale destruction, however, she has a hard time using it as she lacks stamina.
Lilith Bristol (リーリス・ブリストル, Rīrisu Burisutoru)
Voiced by: Haruka Yamazaki (Japanese); Caitlin Glass (English)
A transfer student from England came from an affluent family. She is a very exceptional student who at a young age has learned how to shoot and hunt, however, she is also selfish and arrogant. She is called an "Exception" and due to this, she claims to be able to do anything regardless of the rules. She went to Japan in order to form a duo with Tor after hearing news about his capability and being special just like Lilith, however much to her disappointment Tor declines. She later falls in love with Tor, and declares he will be her future husband and win his heart. Though she is officially enrolled in Koryo Academy, she never attends class claiming that she had already finished her studies a long time ago which is why she prefers loitering around the school garden sipping tea with her confidant Sarah. Her Blaze is a rifle, and she is a superb marksman. Though she is armed with a weapon that she can fire from a distance, she is surprisingly very agile to the point that she can shoot anybody at point blank range.

=== Other ===
Sakuya Tsukumo (九十九 朔夜, Tsukumo Sakuya)
Voiced by: Yui Horie (Japanese); Felecia Angelle (English)
The Chairwoman of Koryo Academy, and is always seen wearing a Gothic Lolita dress. Her way of running the school is so ruthless that she actually encourages battle amongst the students. She's known as the Blaze Diabolica.
Rito Tsukimi (月見 璃兎, Tsukimi Rito)
Voiced by: Yukari Tamura (Japanese); Jennifer McDaniel (English)
Tor's homeroom teacher, who is always energetic and dresses like a maid with bunny ears, which greatly disturbs her entire class. She has two personalities; the first one is a child-like, carefree, and happy person who likes calling her students various names, while the second is a foul-mouthed, sadistic, and ruthless villain, who doesn't even think twice about attacking her own students. Despite her cold attitude, it is shown that she does care for her students, as she defended them against K's attack and even gave them a thumbs up. She does not appear to like a lot of attention on her, as she is seen running away from a bunch of students the next day. Her Blaze is a sword. She gains Level 4 Sublimation from Sakuya and she has a new ability "Ouburos"
Imari Nagakura (永倉 伊万里, Nagakura Imari)
Voiced by: Haruka Tomatsu (Japanese); Michelle Rojas (English)
Imari is the first person Tor talks to after entering the school. However, she is soon expelled from the school after losing against Tor during the entrance ceremony's combat exam. Her Blaze consists of a single sword, which she wields like a katana. She reappeared when Tor's class was sent to a summer training camp at some remote island where Koryo Academy has another branch, where students like her who failed the combat exam from the main branch were actually transferred there and were trained to become shinobis. She was also one of the greeting parties who ambushed Tor's class the moment they arrived on the island.
Aoi Torasaki (虎崎 葵, Torasaki Aoi)
Voiced by: Natsuki Hanae (Japanese); Anthony Bowling (English)
Commonly known as Tora. He is Tor's childhood friend who is also considered an Irregular. His Blaze is a katar.
Ryutaro Tatsuno (辰乃 龍太朗, Tatsuno Ryūtarō)
Voiced by: Yoshihisa Kawahara (Japanese); Tyson Rinehart (English)
Known by his nickname Tatsu, he is Tora's roommate. Tatsu has a muscular physique; he is also the tallest person in class. His Blaze is a naginata. His full name is Ryutaro Tatsuno (辰乃 龍太朗, Tatsuno Ryūtarō) (in the manga). Rito often calls him "Barbarian".
K
Voiced by: Takahiro Sakurai (Japanese); Z. Charles Bolton (English)
A soldier of Equipment Smith and the younger brother of Ryan Wayfair. His real name is Kevin Wayfair (ケヴィン＝ウェイフェア, Kevin Weifea). Since he lost his family at a young age, he was sold to Equipment Smith, who made him a ruthless killing machine that only cares about power and results.
Sakaki Narukami (榊鳴神, Narukami Sakaki)
Tor's former best friend who is responsible for killing Tor's sister Otoha and Julie's father in the past.
Equipment Smith (イクイップメント・スミス, Ikuippumento Sumisu)
Voiced by: Tomomichi Nishimura (Japanese); Kent Williams (English)
A scientist who developed the Unit suits and resents Sakuya's grandfather for defeating him many years ago, believing Units are superior to Exceeds. His real name is Edward Walker (エドワード·ウォルカー, Edowādo Worukā). After K is defeated and he begins to insult him and call him a failure, K kills him.
Silent Diva (洌游の對姫/サイレントディーバ, Sairento Dība)
Voiced by: Ai Kayano (Japanese); Dawn M. Bennett (English)
Silent Diva is a young woman, with her light blue hair coming down to her hips, and she has purple clothes with diamonds on each side of her hair, and she has purple eyes, just like Sakuya. Also known as Beatrix Emerald.
Sarah (サラ, Sara)
Voiced by: Nozomi Nishida (Japanese); Alex Moore (English)
Sara is Lilith Bristol's female butler. Sara comes from a family that serves as their butlers.
Dark Ray Disaster
Voiced by: Takuya Eguchi (Japanese); Joel McDonald (English)
Also known as Hugo.
Tempest Judge
Voiced by: Satoshi Hino (Japanese); J. Michael Tatum (English)
Also known as Cloweiss.
Grave Phantom
Voiced by: Kentarō Itō (Japanese); Chris Rager (English)
Also known as Ougi.
Momo Kibitsu (吉備津 桃, Kibitsu Momo)
Voiced by: Mami Uchida (Japanese); Leah Clark (English)
One of Rito Tsukimi's students.
Otoha Kokonoe (九重 音羽, Kokonoe Otoha)
Voiced by: Manami Tanaka (Japanese); Lara Woodhull (English)
Tor's deceased sister who was killed by Sakaki Narukami.
Ryan Wayfair (ライアン ウェイフェア, Raian Weifea)
Voiced by: Takahiro Miyake (Japanese); Robert McCollum (English)
K's brother who died after protecting K.
Miwa
Voiced by: Aimi Tanaka (Japanese); Jamie Marchi (English)
Imari Nagakura's duo partner.

== Media ==
=== Light novels ===
The first light novel was published on August 24, 2012, by Media Factory under their MF Bunko J imprint. Eleven volumes have been published as of July 2016.

No.	Title	Release date	ISBN
1	Kokuhaku wa Sōkoku no Yoru ni (告白は蒼刻の夜に)	August 24, 2012	978-4-04-066487-3
2	Uso to Shin to Akai Kurenai (嘘と真と赤い紅)	December 25, 2012	978-4-04-066470-5
3	Nagisa ni Yureru Koi Monogatari (渚に揺れる恋物語り)	June 25, 2013	978-4-8401-5228-0
4	Reimei Seshi Inō no Kyōkai (黎明せし異能の境界)	November 25, 2013	978-4-04-066029-5
5	Yami no Gin Ōkami, Hikari no Shinen (闇ノ銀狼、光ノ深淵)	March 25, 2014	978-4-04-066312-8
6	Kaze to Homura to Kaminari to (風と焔と雷と)	July 25, 2014	978-4-04-066911-3
7	Kinki no Kajitsu (禁忌の果実)	December 25, 2014	978-4-04-067312-7
8	Memories Connect	March 25, 2015	978-4-04-067473-5
9	Ashes to Ashes (ashes to ashes,)	July 24, 2015	978-4-04-067717-0
10	Dust to Dust (dust to dust.)	January 25, 2016	978-4-04-068036-1
11	Jeg kan lide dig,	July 25, 2016	978-4-04-068455-0

=== Manga ===
A manga adaptation with art by Shinichiro Nariie started serialization in Media Factory's seinen manga magazine Monthly Comic Alive from April 27, 2013, and has been collected in a three tankōbon volumes. A second spin-off four-panel comedy manga adaptation titled Absolute Duo Tea Party (アブソリュート・デュオ TEA PARTY) with art by Tor Oiwaka will also be serialized in Monthly Comic Alive magazine with the December 2014 issue to be sold on October 27, 2014. Seven Seas Entertainment has licensed the series in North America.

==== Volumes ====
===== Absolute Duo =====
No.	Original release date	Original ISBN	English release date	English ISBN
1	November 22, 2013	978-4-04-066113-1	August 29, 2017	978-1-626925-39-7
2	September 23, 2014	978-4-04-066850-5	December 26, 2017	978-1-626926-64-6
3	March 23, 2015	978-4-04-067288-5	April 3, 2018	978-1-626927-16-2
4	September 23, 2017	978-4-04-069202-9	November 27, 2018	978-1-626929-39-5

===== Absolute Duo Tea Party =====
No.	Release date	ISBN
1	January 23, 2015	978-4-04-067245-8

=== Anime ===
An anime television series adaptation by Eight Bit was announced at Media Factory's 2014 Summer School Festival event. It aired between January 4 and March 22, 2015, on AT-X. It also aired on Tokyo MX, Sun Television, Kyoto Broadcasting System, Television Aichi Broadcasting and Nippon BS Broadcasting at later dates. Crunchyroll began streaming episodes to parts of Europe, the Middle East and Northern Africa in the same week, and Funimation has licensed the anime, broadcasting English-dubbed episodes on its online service starting March 16. Following Sony's acquisition of Crunchyroll, the series was moved to Crunchyroll.

The opening theme song is "Absolute Soul" by Konomi Suzuki, the first ending theme song is "BelievexBelieve" by Nozomi Yamamoto, the second ending theme song is "Apple Tea no Aji" (アップルティーの味, lit. The Taste of Apple Tea) by Yamamoto and Haruka Yamazaki, and the third ending theme song is "2/2" by Ayaka Imamura and Ayaka Suwa.

==== Episodes ====
No.	Title	Original release date
1	"Blaze" "Bureizu" (Japanese: 焔牙/ブレイズ)	January 4, 2015
Tor is in a small battle with anyone that is seated next to each other, in a head-to-head fight. Meanwhile, Sakuya tells everyone in the building the same, to pass the test.
2	"Duo" "Dyuo" (Japanese: 絆双刃/デュオ)	January 11, 2015
The following day, rumors of Tor and Julie had spread. The two, the only boy-girl duo in the year, become quick friends with Tomoe and Miyabi at breakfast. After they had a strange and weird lesson on the rules and basics, the class then went onto training. More misunderstandings were made by Tomoe. After that, they went onto sparring. Due to Julie's remarkable talent in sparring, no one other than Tor volunteered to spar with her. The end of the week has come and Tor had discovered that Julie still doesn't have a Duo after Tomoe's rejection so he runs after her and with the sounds of the bells on her hairband, he finds her standing on the balcony of the clock tower. It was there that they made their Duo oath to each other and became a Duo...
3	"Avenger" "Avenjā" (Japanese: 復讐者/アヴェンジャー)	January 18, 2015
On the day after the official duos have been determined, Rito Tsukimi informed her students in the classroom of the upcoming New Blade Battle which will be held in the next couple of days. In preparation for the battle, Tor and Julie trained themselves and practiced their combat skills with their Blazes. Later at the sport stadium, Tor found Miyabi, exhausted, running along the track when she suddenly collapsed. Unconscious, she is picked up and carried back to her dormitory by Tor. On the way, she wakes up and Tor encouraged her to keep training in order to become stronger...
4	"Exception" "Ekusepushon" (Japanese: 特別/エクセプション)	January 25, 2015
Being told that they're someone like her, Lilith Bristol travels to Japan in order to meet Tor Kokonoe, because he is special, just like her. Much later, everyone gathered at the classroom, Tora and Tatsu thanks Miyabi and Tomoe for helping them when they were injured. During the lesson, Tor thinks about what Sakuya said before. But in the middle of the lesson, Lilith appears and tells Tor to come with her, which annoys Rito. Lilith says that starting from now on, Tor will be her Duo partner, but Tor explains that he already has a Duo partner and declined. Later, Tor asks Julie if she wants to go somewhere the next break, and she says yes...
5	"Level Up" "Reberuappu" (Japanese: 位階昇華/レベルアップ)	February 1, 2015
After the events of the New Blade Battle, Tor and his companions sublimate to level 2. Likewise, their stats increase dramatically. Later, however, Tor is forced to leave school with Lilith to go to New Death Land, an amusement park. In the end, Tor declines her offer to be a Duo once again, and goes back to his dorm meeting up with Julie. Upset the following day, Lilith trespasses on the 2nd year's battles and defeats them all. She then challenges the entire 1st year class to her Survive.
6	"Survive" "Sabaibu" (Japanese: 生存闘争/サバイブ)	February 8, 2015
Lilith quickly takes out everyone, leaving Tor's group. After a well-executed plan, Tor's group manages to push Lilith into a corner. Then, a group of men in armor show up and shoot both Tor and Lilith. They took Lilith with them, but before they could, Tor broke the ground beneath them. Having defeated them, Tor and Lilith face off. In the next scene, Tor is shown in the infirmary, surrounded by his friends, healing his wounds. Lilith comes in and after thanking him for rescuing her, kisses him and tells them that he is her future husband, to the shock of everyone.
7	"Silver-Blonde, Yellow Topaz" "Gin'iro no kami Koganeiro no kami" (Japanese: 銀色の髪, 黄金色の髪)	February 15, 2015
On the way to the island for the training camp with a boat, Julie's laying at Tor's lap because she is feeling bad. Later, Tora and Tatsu tell them that Rito wants to see them; she tells the students that they're going to swim from the boat to the island where the camping is. But Julie can't swim, so Tor has to carry her. On their way, Lilith appears and jumps from the helicopter to play with Tor, however, he tells her that there's no time to play, which Lilith agrees on. After reaching the island, Tor is laying at the beach to rest after the long trip. Continuing to reach the camp, the three have to go through the forest, however, some people attacked them – causing them to fight back. But what Tor didn't expect is that he met someone he is familiar with; which is the lively Imari Nagakura, his opponent during the Kouryou Academy enrollment exam...
8	"Selection" "Hinpyō-kai" (Japanese: 品評会/セレクション)	February 22, 2015
Miyabi confesses to Tor, but he refuses, remembering his past failure of saving someone else.
9	"Rebels" "Ribērusu" (Japanese: 神滅部隊／リベールス)	March 1, 2015
Koryo Academy is under attack. Tor and Julie work together in battling the chief of the marauding corps, while Tomoe searches for Miyabi.
10	"Reign Conference" "Reinkanfarensu" (Japanese: 七芒夜会/レインカンファレンス)	March 8, 2015
In the ruins of the facility, Tor and his friends are searching for a missing Miyabi, only to be stopped by Rito who tells the students that they had to leave the island. Despite Tomoe's and Tor's plea to stay in for their search, the rabbit teacher tells them that it was under the headmistress orders, forcing them aboard the ship and leave the island. Two days have passed since the incident, Tor senses something different about Tomoe even her discipline remains unchanged, though only Lilith seeing Tomoe's upset reaction over Miyabi's disappearance while passing through the shower room...
11	"Killing Game" "kiringugēmu" (Japanese: 殺破遊戯/キリングゲーム)	March 15, 2015
Having witnessed Miyabi's strange behavior and her power that defeats the securities with ease, Tor asks K what they did to Miyabi which K replies as merely a "gift", power which is combined with Exceeds and Unit; she is actually brainwashed by K. Tomoe comes for Miyabi for her protection from K, only to be shocked as not only does Miyabi hurt her, she also learned from Lilith about her brainwashing. Unable to stand K's mockery, Tor is going to attack K but instead, he is confronting Miyabi. Meanwhile, during the Reign Conference, Equipment Smith is gloating by telling Sakuya, who realized that he has been keeping an eye onto the girl who was desperately gaining Tor's attention, that Miyabi is his best creation...
12	"Absolute Duo" "Abusoryūto Dyuo" (Japanese: 絶対双刃/アブソリュート・デュオ)	March 22, 2015
The idea of wanting to protect someone is still foreign to K, so in a dramatic, no-holds-barred faceoff, Tor decides to show him how it is done. After K's defeat, Tor is discharged from the hospital, and he and Julie renew their vows as duo partners.
