= When Supernatural Battles Became Commonplace =

Japanese light novel series and its franchise

- First light novel volume cover, featuring Tomoyo Kanzaki

異能バトルは日常系のなかで (Inō-Batoru wa Nichijō-kei no Naka de)
- Genre: Romantic comedy; Slice of life; Supernatural
- Light novel
- Written by: Kōta Nozomi
- Illustrated by: 029
- Published by: SB Creative
- English publisher: NA: J-Novel Club
- Imprint: GA Bunko
- Original run: June 15, 2012 – January 13, 2018
- Volumes: 13
- Manga
- Written by: Kota Nozomi
- Illustrated by: Kōsuke Kurose
- Published by: Kadokawa Shoten
- Magazine: Comp Ace
- Original run: September 2013 – February 2015
- Volumes: 4
- Anime television series
- Directed by: Masahiko Otsuka (chief); Masanori Takahashi
- Produced by: Ryousuke Inagaki
- Written by: Masahiko Otsuka
- Music by: Elements Garden
- Studio: Trigger
- Licensed by: Crunchyroll (Note: In Australia via Madman Anime and the UK via Crunchyroll UK and Ireland.); NA: Sentai Filmworks
- Original network: TV Tokyo, TVO, TVA, AT-X
- Original run: October 6, 2014 – December 22, 2014
- Episodes: 12
- icon

When Supernatural Battles Became Commonplace (Japanese: 異能バトルは日常系のなかで, Hepburn: Inō-Batoru wa Nichijō-kei no Naka de), (Note: Also translated as Inou-Battle in the Usually Daze (light novel) and Inou Battle Within Everyday Life (anime).) simply known as InoBato, is a Japanese light novel series written by Kōta Nozomi with illustrations by 029. SB Creative has published it in thirteen volumes from 2012 to 2018 under their GA Bunko imprint. A manga adaptation with art by Kōsuke Kurose was serialized in Kadokawa Shoten's Comp Ace from September 2013 to February 2015 and compiled in four volumes. A 12-episode anime television series adaptation by Trigger aired between October and December 2014.

== Plot ==
The story focuses on Senkō High School's Literature Club, whose five members—Jurai, Tomoyo, Hatoko, Sayumi, and Chifuyu—have all somehow developed superpowers. Their superpowers have now become a part of their everyday lives as they battle against others wielding similar powers while struggling through growing up.

== Characters ==
=== Literature Club members ===
Jurai Andō (安藤 寿来, Andō Jurai)
Voiced by: Mamoru Miyano (drama CD), Nobuhiko Okamoto (anime) (Japanese); Mateo Mpinduzi-Mott (English)
The main protagonist, who has a notable case of 'chunibyo' (eighth grader syndrome), which he maintains even after getting actual superpowers. As such, he is the one who has given names to everyone's powers, which are each spelled with kanji characters but have English readings. His power is "Dark and Dark" (黒焰(ダークアンドダーク), Dāku ando Dāku; lit. 'Black Flame'), which is a seemingly useless black flame.
Tomoyo Kanzaki (神崎 灯代, Kanzaki Tomoyo)
Voiced by: Asami Imai (drama CD), Haruka Yamazaki (anime) (Japanese); Shanae’a Moore (English)
A red-haired girl who is constantly bemused by Jurai's antics and has feelings for him. Her power is "Closed Clock" (永遠(クローズドクロック), Kurōzudo Kurokku; lit. 'Eternity'), which lets her speed up, slow down, or stop time, though she cannot rewind it. It is later revealed that she is trying to become a light-novelist but this is only known to Jurai where he accidentally found out.
Hatoko Kushikawa (櫛川 鳩子, Kushikawa Hatoko)
Voiced by: Hisako Kanemoto (drama CD), Saori Hayami (anime) (Japanese); Melissa Molano (English)
A polite airheaded girl who often takes Jurai's chuunibyou antics seriously. She is also Jurai's childhood best friend and has feelings for him as well. Her power is "Over Element" (五帝(オーバーエレメント), Ōbā Eremento; lit. 'Five Emperors'), giving her the ability to manipulate five main elements: earth, water, fire, wind, and light. She can use these elements simultaneously to create a variety of effects (i.e combining earth and fire to create magma).
Sayumi Takanashi (高梨 彩弓, Takanashi Sayumi)
Voiced by: Yumi Hara (drama CD), Risa Taneda (anime) (Japanese); Maggie Flecknoe (English)
The literature club's president. She is normally seen reading books and appears to have hints of feelings for Ando. Her power is "Root of Origin" (始原(ルートオブオリジン), Rūto obu Orijin; lit. 'The Beginning'), in which anyone or anything she touches returns to its original state, although the exact nature of this remains vague. Later on, she "awakens" to the ability of returning people and possibly objects to places they have been before.
Chifuyu Himeki (姫木 千冬, Himeki Chifuyu)
Voiced by: Rie Kugimiya (drama CD), Nanami Yamashita (anime) (Japanese); Sasha Paysinger (English)
A fourth year elementary school student who is the adviser's niece. Her power is "World Create" (創世(ワールドクリエイト), Wārudo Kurieito; lit. 'Genesis'), allowing her to create matter and space itself. She can also tap into the earth's memory to create matter she has never seen before. She once had a fight with her best friend, Madoka, before she requested Shiharu to help her to make up with her best friend. Also has romantic feelings for Ando.

=== Others ===
Mirei Kudō (工藤 美玲, Kudō Mirei)
Voiced by: Kana Asumi (drama CD) Kaori Fukuhara (anime) (Japanese); Melissa Pritchett (English)
The student council president who develops her own ability. Her ability is "Grateful Robber" (強欲(グレイトフルラバー), Gureitofuru Rabā; lit. 'Greed'), which allows her to steal any ability she witnesses being activated. She initially mistook a letter from Jurai to be a love confession (due to robber and lover having the pronunciation rabā) and falls for him. Even after getting rejected, she remains friends with Jurai.
Hajime Kiryū (桐生 一, Kiryū Hajime)
Voiced by: Tomokazu Seki (drama CD) Takuma Terashima (anime) (Japanese); Benjamin McLaughlin (English)
Tomoyo's older half-brother who left home a year ago. Like Jurai, he is also quite into 'chunibyo'. His ability is "Pinpoint Abyss" which allows him to open up black holes that sucks his opponents in and returning them into their previous location before the meeting without any memories of what has transpired, prior to being a power user, he used to attend college and even has a job.
Hitomi Saito (斉藤 一十三, Saitō Hitomi)
Voiced by: Ayumi Fujimura (Japanese); Regina Chen (English)
The second-in-command for Hajime's gang.
Lithia (リーティア, Rītia)
Voiced by: Yuka Ōtsubo (drama CD) Sayuri Hara (anime) (Japanese); Chaney Moore (English)
She is a fairy assigned to Kiryu's clique, who advises them with all matters pertaining to the fairy wars. Though, small in size, she can be quite a handful when arguing with anyone within the group.
Shizumu Sagami (相模 静夢, Sagami Shizumu)
Voiced by: Yoshimasa Hosoya (Japanese); Blake Shepard (English)
A boy at school who constantly gets dumped by his girls due to his otaku behavior. Despite both enjoying anime, he and Jurai do not get along. It is suggested that he too is a power user who also belongs to Kiryu's clique. However, Kiryu dislikes him for his usurping nature.
Madoka Kuki (九鬼 円, Kuki Madoka)
Voiced by: Emiri Katō (Japanese); Terri Doty (English)
Chifuyu's best friend and classmate in elementary school, who she nicknames "Cookie". Madoka once got into a fight with Chifuyu, before Chifuyu requested Shiharu to help her win Madoka as a gift to make up with her.
Shiharu Satomi (里見 詩春, Satomi Shiharu)
Voiced by: Kaori Nazuka (Japanese); Kaytha Coker (English)
The literary club's advisor and Chifuyu's aunt, who often brings Chifuyu to the club due to her busy schedule.
Maiya Takanashi (高梨 舞矢, Takanashi Maiya)
Voiced by: Sumire Morohoshi (Japanese); Karlii Hoch (English)
Sayumi's younger sister.

== Media ==
=== Light novels ===
The first light novel volume was published on June 16, 2012, by SB Creative under their GA Bunko imprint. The series ended with the release of its 13th volume on January 13, 2018. Digital light novel publisher J-Novel Club is publishing the series in English.

No.	Original release date	Original ISBN	English release date	English ISBN
1	June 16, 2012	978-4-7973-6991-5	February 13, 2022	978-1-71-830298-3
2	October 17, 2012	978-4-7973-7197-0	May 1, 2022	978-1-71-830300-3
3	March 16, 2013	978-4-7973-7303-5	July 18, 2022	978-1-71-830302-7
4	July 16, 2013	978-4-7973-7470-4	October 2, 2022	978-1-71-830304-1
5	November 15, 2013	978-4-7973-7525-1	December 19, 2022	978-1-71-830306-5
6	March 17, 2014	978-4-7973-7660-9	June 28, 2023	978-1-71-830308-9
7	July 14, 2014	978-4-7973-7790-3	August 2, 2023	978-1-71-830310-2
8	October 14, 2014	978-4-7973-8017-0	October 18, 2023	978-1-71-830312-6
9	November 14, 2014	978-4-7973-8159-7	January 11, 2024	978-1-71-830314-0
10	March 13, 2015	978-4-7973-8236-5	April 4, 2024	978-1-71-830316-4
11	April 15, 2016	978-4-7973-8735-3	June 30, 2024	978-1-71-830318-8
12	September 14, 2016	978-4-7973-8890-9	January 19, 2025	978-1-71-830320-1
13	January 13, 2018	978-4-7973-9386-6	April 3, 2025	978-1-71-830322-5

=== Anime ===
A 12-episode anime television series adaptation by Trigger aired in Japan between October 6 and December 22, 2014, and was simulcast by Crunchyroll. It is directed by Masahiko Ōtsuka, who also handled series composition. Satoshi Yamaguchi designed the characters and Elements Garden composed the music. The opening theme is "OVERLAPPERS" by Qverktett:II (Haruka Yamazaki, Saori Hayami, Risa Taneda, and Nanami Yamashita) whilst the ending theme is "You Gotta Love Me!" by Kato＊Fuku (Emiri Katō and Kaori Fukuhara). The series has been licensed by Sentai Filmworks in North America.

==== Episodes ====
No.	Title	Directed by	Written by	Original release date
1	"Alpha Episode"; Transliteration: "Arufa episōdo" (Japanese: 『異変』アルファ・エピソード)	Masanori Takahashi	Masahiko Ōtsuka; Masanori Takahashi	October 6, 2014
The members of Senkō High School's literature club become shocked when Jurai Andou, a boy usually known for his 'chunibyo' delusions, suddenly develops superpowers of his own. Six months later, each of the club members have since developed their own superpowers, which they put to the test in their monthly check-up. When student council member Mirei Kudou comes to check on the club, she ends up misinterpreting Jurai's chunibyo behavior and inadvertently reveals that she herself has developed superpowers as well. Mirei challenges the club to a superpower battle, using her own ability to steal Jurai's "Dark and Dark" ability, only to find it to be nothing more than a useless lukewarm flame. With the other members knowing not to show off their powers before her, Sayumi easily beats Mirei in a physical match. Learning that Mirei learned of the club's powers from an anonymous text, the group become curious about just who sent it.
2	"Misconception"; Transliteration: "Misukonsepushon" (Japanese: 『誤想』ミスコンセプション)	Yoshihiro Miyajima	Masahiko Ōtsuka	October 13, 2014
Mirei receives an elaborately-phrased letter from Jurai, intended to give her ability the name of "Grateful Robber", but misreads it as "Grateful Lover", misinterpreting the letter as a love letter and declaring herself to now be Jurai's girlfriend, leading the entire club, Jurai included, baffled. After having to deal with both Mirei's over-the-top affections and the jealous glares of the other girls, Jurai explains the situation to Mirei, who seems heartbroken from being turned down. As Tomoyo Kanzaki comes to cheer up Jurai during his moment of guilt, he explains he chose that particular name for Mirei's power so it would match the others and show that she was one of their friends. Afterwards, Jurai receives an e-mail from Mirei apologising for the misunderstanding and accepting the name he gave her power.
3	"Rendezvous Point"; Transliteration: "Randebū pointo" (Japanese: 『邂逅』ランデブーポイント)	Kazuhiko Ishii	Masahiko Ōtsuka	October 20, 2014
The literature club have a recreation day spent playing tennis with their abilities. Later, as Jurai goes off to search for his misplaced "Bloody Bible", the other girls reflect on how he, despite his odd behavior, has been helping them all this time. While retrieving his book, Jurai comes across an alumnus named Hajime Kiryuu, who seems to share his passion for chunibyo naming. He is later revealed to be Tomoyo's older half-brother who left home a year ago. The next day, honorary literature club member Chifuyu Himeki appears before Jurai, stating she has quit elementary school.
4	"Capricious Lady"; Transliteration: "Kapurishasu redi" (Japanese: 『奇行』カプリシャスレディ)	Yasuo Ejima	Nanami Higuchi	October 27, 2014
Jurai brings Chifuyu back to her school, meeting up with her friend, Madoka Kuki, before returning to his own school. Later, the club use Chifuyu's "World Create" ability to dress up in various cosplay outfits, after which Chifuyu's aunt, teacher Shiharu Satomi, mentions that Chifuyu had left school early. Later, Chifuyu shows up at Jurai's house after getting into a fight with Madoka, who told her not to spend time with the Literature Club anymore. Things get worse between them due to Chifuyu being unable to tell Madoka about her powers, leading her to believe she likes them more than her. Jurai attempts his own dubious manner of trying to get the two to make up, but Chifuyu accomplishes this on her own by having Shiharu help her win Madoka a plush to match with hers. Afterwards, Chifuyu reveals that her wanting to quit elementary school was from a desire to skip grades and enter high school alongside the other members.
5	"Sensitive Age"; Transliteration: "Senshitibu eiji" (Japanese: 『厨二』センシティブエイジ)	Hisatoshi Shimizu	Nanami Higuchi	November 5, 2014
Jurai buys himself a guitar, which he risks in a game against Chifuyu. Whilst retrieving his bag later that day, Jurai learns that Tomoyo is trying to become a light novel author, being, to her, surprisingly supportive about it. Tomoyo feels pleased the next day when she passes the first round of a light novel award, so Jurai invites her to lunch on the weekend to celebrate. As the two spend time together on what many would see as a "date", element manipulator Hatoko Kushikawa is shocked to see them together.
6	"Vice Penalty"; Transliteration: "Vaisu penaruti" (Japanese: 『罪悪』ヴァイスペナルティ)	Yoshinari Suzuki	Masahiko Ōtsuka	November 12, 2014
After working with the Literature Club members to make a personalized video game for Jurai's birthday, Sayumi Takanashi, who has the power to revert things to their original state, catches a cold. Jurai pays Sayumi a visit at her house, where he meets her younger sister, Maiya, though Sayumi's attitude suddenly changes when Jurai brings up how she was the student council in middle school yet not currently. The next day, after Jurai hears from Maiya about how Sayumi had originally wanted to join the student council during high school, Mirei theorizes she may have turned it down due to her powers. This leads Jurai to recall an incident that happened ten months ago in which Sayumi, who suggested they use her "Root of Origin" ability to remove everyone's powers, battled against Jurai who was against it. The result of that battle showed that Sayumi's power could not erase Jurai's Dark and Dark, as their powers were meant to be accepted as part of themselves. Sayumi later explains that her change in attitude was purely due to her medication, also stating she has no regrets turning down the student council for the sake of her fellow club members.
7	"Juggernaut On"; Transliteration: "Jagānōto on" (Japanese: 『覚醒』ジャガーノートオン)	Yoshihiro Miyajima	Nanami Higuchi	November 17, 2014
Hatoko is invited to Jurai's house to make dinner for him and his sister, but gets downhearted when Jurai decides to stay at school to talk with Tomoyo about her writing. Hatoko gets angry at Jurai when he refuses to tell her what he talked about with Tomoyo and snaps at him, going on a rant about how she just can't understand his chunibyo behavior no matter how hard she tries before running off. As Jurai goes off in search for Hatoko, he worries that he might have been putting stress on her the entire time, but Tomoyo slaps some sense into him and helps him search. Meanwhile, Hatoko comes across Hajime, who teaches her not to worry about not being able to understand chunibyo, before using his own power to knock Hatoko unconscious. With Jurai having no luck in finding Hatoko, Sayumi decides to bring her Root of Origin to the next stage in order to find her.
8	"Holmgang Battle"; Transliteration: "Horumugangu batoru" (Japanese: 『戦争』ホルムガングバトル)	Kazuhiko Ishii	Masahiko Ōtsuka	November 24, 2014
A few weeks earlier, Hajime is seen using his "Pinpoint Abyss" ability to defeat another ability user, returning him to his regular life with no memory of his ability. It is revealed that the appearance of the special abilities is the result of a "Fairy War" pitting superpowered humans against each other, for the entertainment of a group of fairies, with the last eight users standing being granted a wish. One of these fairies, Litia, informs Hajime's band of ability users, Fallen Black, that an organization known as F is fighting against the war, tasking Hajime with crushing it. While Hajime is meeting up with Jurai, his second-in-command, Hitomi Saito, leads the group in attacking F's base, encountering a mysterious girl allegedly possessing an unstoppable ability, though Hajime soon explains this girl is actually a new member known as System. Back in the present, it is revealed that Hajime's group kidnapped Hatoko by mistake whilst trying to obtain Sayumi for her healing ability. Meanwhile, Sayumi uses her Root of Origin to return the Literature Club back to its original state, teleporting Hatoko back to their side safely, after which Tomoyo clears up the confusion Hatoko had while Jurai apologizes in his own way. While trying to open a bag of potato chips, Jurai's "Dark and Dark" awakens its next evolution.
9	"Girls Approach"; Transliteration: "Gāruzu apurōchi" (Japanese: 『布告』ガールズアプローチ)	Yasuo Ejima	Nanami Higuchi	December 1, 2014
While asking Jurai for some feedback on her completed novel, Tomoyo becomes embarrassed when she hears about a certain silver-wigged girl who convinced Jurai to continue his chunibyo lifestyle. Later, after the girls make Jurai to promise never to use his awakened power ever again, Hatoko helps Tomoyo with her studies. The next day, Jurai makes a promise with Chifuyu to take her to the pool during summer break, with Chifuyu learning that she may have developed feelings for him, while another male classmate, Shizumu Sagami, approaches Sayumi with the prospect of getting together with Jurai. Meanwhile, Hatoko reveals to Tomoyo that she is in love with Jurai, asking if she also feels the same.
10	"Fool's Labyrinth"; Transliteration: "Fūruzu rabirinsu" (Japanese: 『迷路』フールズラビリンス)	Shinsuke Gomi	Masahiko Ōtsuka	December 8, 2014
As Jurai goes on his pool date with Chifuyu, Madoka tries to concoct a plan to get Chifuyu to hate Jurai. However, Jurai overcomes her expectations each time, leaving Madoka to become impressed by him as well. The next day, Sayumi brings Jurai to the very same pool, where Shizumu equips her with a swimsuit that would allegedly become see-through if she gets wet, but it turns out to be a normal swimsuit. Later that night, Tomoyo tries inviting Jurai to the pool, only to learn he is going on a family vacation with Hatoko.
11	"Cupid Error"; Transliteration: "Kyūpiddo erā" (Japanese: 『存在』キューピッドエラー)	Yoshihiro Miyajima	Nanami Higuchi	December 15, 2014
Tomoyo recalls how she first met Jurai during her chunibyo days. Meanwhile, Hatoko tries to follow a magazine's advice to get Jurai to fall for her during their vacation, though with not too much success. Upon his return, Jurai invites Tomoyo to a summer festival where they talk things out and watch the fireworks together, leading Tomoyo to realise she is also in love with Jurai. The next day, Mirei, who was captured by Naoe Hagiura the previous night, summons the literature club members together and steals Hatoko's ability, using it against her.
12	"Usual Days"; Transliteration: "Yūjuaru deizu" (Japanese: 『日常』ユージュアルデイズ)	Masahiko Ōtsuka	Masahiko Ōtsuka	December 22, 2014
Mirei steals Chifuyu's ability when she uses it to protect Hatoko, before Tomoyo helps everyone to escape. Regrouping at a karaoke box, the group deduce that the Mirei they fought against was an imposter possessing her body. Jurai goes by himself to confront the imposter, tricking her into stealing his enhanced "Dark and Dark of the End", which only serves to burn its user's hand with a neverending flame that cannot be extinguished. This forces the imposter to return Mirei to her body, after which they use Chifuyu's powers to chop off the burning hands and send them to another dimension whilst Sayumi heals them. Elsewhere, Hajime defeats Naoe back in her original body, who was also revealed to have set up, and subsequently betrayed by Shizumu. Following the incident, Tomoyo and Hatoko discuss their respective feelings for Jurai, before everyone returns to their everyday lives.
