= Kazuaki Kurihara =

Japanese karateka

- Born: 20 August 1979; Ibaraki Prefecture, Japan
- Style: Shotokan Karate
- Teacher(s): Masaaki Ueki
- Rank: 6th Dan karate (JKA)

Kazuaki Kurihara (Kurihara Kazuaki, 20 August 1979) is a Japanese instructor of Shotokan karate. He has won the JKA's version of the world championships for kata on 3 occasions. He has also won the JKA All-Japan championships for kata on 10 occasions and once for kumite. He is currently an instructor of the Japan Karate Association.

== Biography ==
Kazuaki Kurihara was born in Ibaraki Prefecture, Japan on 20 August 1979. He studied at Komazawa University. His karate training began during his Age 5.

== Competition ==
Kazuaki Kurihara has had considerable success in karate competition.

=== Major Tournament Success ===
- 56th JKA All Japan Karate Championship (2013) - 1st Place Kata
- 55th JKA All Japan Karate Championship (2012) - 1st Place Kata
- 12th Funakoshi Gichin Cup World Karate-do Championship Tournament (Pattaya, 2011) - 1st Place Kata
- 54th JKA All Japan Karate Championship (2011) - 1st Place Kumite
- 54th JKA All Japan Karate Championship (2011) - 1st Place Kata
- 53rd JKA All Japan Karate Championship (2010) - 1st Place Kata
- 52nd JKA All Japan Karate Championship (2009) - 1st Place Kata
- 50th JKA All Japan Karate Championship (2007) - 1st Place Kata, 3rd Place Kumite
- 10th Funakoshi Gichin Cup World Karate-do Championship Tournament (Sydney, 2006) - 1st Place Kata
- 49th JKA All Japan Karate Championship (2006) - 1st Place Kata
- 48th JKA All Japan Karate Championship (2005) - 2nd Place Kata
