= List of Isekai Quartet episodes =

Logo for Isekai Quartet

Isekai Quartet is a Japanese anime series that serves as a chibi-style crossover between the light novel series KonoSuba, Overlord, Re:Zero − Starting Life in Another World and The Saga of Tanya the Evil, all published by Kadokawa Corporation.

The series is produced by Studio Puyukai, directed and written by Minoru Ashina, with character designs by Minoru Takehara, who also is chief animation director. The first season aired from April 9 to June 25, 2019. Funimation licensed the series and streams it in both Japanese and English dubbed. In April 2019, it was added to Crunchyroll's streaming library as well. The opening theme song is "Isekai Quartet" (異世界かるてっと, Isekai Karutetto), performed by Satoshi Hino, Jun Fukushima, Yūsuke Kobayashi and Aoi Yūki, while the ending theme song is "Isekai Girls Talk" (異世界ガールズ♡トーク, Isekai Gāruzu Tōku) , performed by Yumi Hara, Sora Amamiya, Rie Takahashi and Aoi Yūki.

Following the final episode of the first season, a second season was announced, with the staff returning to reprise their respective roles, and aired from January 14 to March 31, 2020. The season includes guest appearances of characters from The Rising of the Shield Hero. The opening theme song is "Isekai Showtime" (異世界ショータイム, Isekai Shōtaimu), performed by Hino, Fukushima, Kobayashi and Yūki, while the ending theme song is "Ponkotsu! Isekai Theater" (ポンコツ!異世界シアター, Ponkotsu! Isekai Shiatā), performed by Sumire Uesaka, Rie Takahashi, Inori Minase, and Saori Hayami. Funimation licensed the series for a simuldub. Crunchyroll also streamed the season. Muse Asia streamed the season in Southeast Asia.

Following the final episode of the second season, a sequel to the anime series was announced, which was later confirmed to be an anime film, with returning staff and cast. The film, titled Isekai Quartet: The Movie – Another World, premiered on June 10, 2022. The film's theme song is "Melodic Road Movie" (メロディックロードムービー, Merodikku Rōdo Mūbī), performed by Konomi Suzuki featuring Kashitarō Itō.

A third season of the anime series was announced on June 13, 2025, and features characters from The Eminence in Shadow., which aired from October 13 to December 22, 2025. The opening theme song is "Isekai Concerto" (異世界こんちぇると, Isekai Konchieruto), performed by Hino, Fukushima, Kobayashi and Yūki, the ending theme song is "Kimi Iro, Boku Iro" (君色、僕色; Your Color, My Color), performed by Konomi Suzuki and Kashitaro Ito. Crunchyroll streamed the season.

== Series overview ==
Season	Episodes	Originally released	
Season	Episodes	First released	Last released
1	12	April 9, 2019	June 25, 2019
2	12	January 14, 2020	March 31, 2020
3	11	October 13, 2025	December 22, 2025

== Episodes ==
=== Season 1 (2019) ===
No. overall	No. in season	Title	Directed by	Storyboarded by	Original release date
1	1	"Come Together! Quartet"; Transliteration: "Shūketsu! Karutetto" (Japanese: 集結！かるてっと)	Minoru Ashina	Minoru Takehara	April 9, 2019
In the KonoSuba world, Kazuma Satou's party comes across a big red button. Meanwhile in the Overlord world inside the Great Tomb of Nazarick, Ainz Ooal Gown receives reports from Floor Guardian Demiurge of strange red buttons randomly appearing throughout Nazarick. Megumin intentionally pushes the button and soon Ainz follows by setting theirs off as a result of accidentally sitting on one that suddenly appeared on his throne. Both series' casts are sent to another world featuring a school. They soon learn they are not alone in the new world as the cast of The Saga of Tanya the Evil were also sent to the world as a result of Tanya von Degurechaff pushing two buttons during the upgraded Elenium Type-97 experiment. Soon the cast of Re:Zero joins them inside the school as Kurt von Rudersdorf takes on the role of school principal.
2	2	"Tension! Introductions"; Transliteration: "Kinpaku! Jiko Shōkai" (Japanese: 緊迫！じこしょうかい)	Minoru Ashina	Minoru Takehara	April 16, 2019
Roswaal L. Mathers takes position as one of the school teachers and introduces the "school life" rules for the students. The students are then allowed to introduce themselves to their class peers. Later after school is over, Ainz and his Floor Guardians walk on a sidewalk when they are confronted by Aqua, who explains that she cannot allow the undead to continue and attempts to use her magic to vanquish them. She fails and is immediately hit on the head by Kazuma, who proceeds to apologize to Ainz and drag Aqua away. The next day, Aqua is punished by Roswaal for trying to start a fight with her fellow students.
3	3	"Deadlock! Classmates"; Transliteration: "Kōchaku! Kurasumeito" (Japanese: 膠着！くらすめいと)	Nurutema	Nurutema	April 23, 2019
After Roswaal tells to the class not to do anything to that threatens their school life, Demiurge explains to the class that his belief is if they try and break any rules of school life, they would be hindering their opportunity to return to their respective worlds. The class is then presented with a talent show that'll happen in the upcoming days, where Subaru explains to his series' cast during lunch that he has a good talent planned. Meanwhile, Tanya is eating lunch with Viktoriya Ivanovna Serebryakov outside when she notices Ainz and starts to suspect he might be the accursed "Being X". When class resumes, she confronts him and demands that he meets her outside of class in park after school, which angers Albedo. The two instead agree to discuss the matter now at the park while Albedo is forced by another teacher, Erich von Rerugen, to remain in class.
4	4	"Encounter! Classmates"; Transliteration: "Kaikō! Kurasumeito" (Japanese: 邂逅！くらすめいと)	Minoru Ashina	Minoru Takehara	April 30, 2019
Tanya and Ainz discover in the park that they are both humans that have been sent to other worlds. As the two get to know each other better, Viktoriya arrives after class to retrieve Tanya and leave. Albedo, who spied on the two talking before they departed, becomes infuriated. The next day, Subaru and Kazuma are respectively carried by the much faster Rem and Darkness as to avoid being late to class. After seeing that they both had the same idea, both ask to be dropped but are consequently late for school, while Rem and Darkness arrive just in time. Subaru and Kazuma are punished and discover that they both have been transported to another world based on the fact that they have Japanese names. The two talk on the school roof and Kazuma becomes jealous when he finds out Subaru is surrounded with girls that are actually useful, unlike his party. Kazuma declares Subaru his enemy as a result.
5	5	"Explosion! Talent Show"; Transliteration: "Sakuretsu! Konshinkai" (Japanese: 炸裂！こんしんかい)	Minoru Ashina	Minoru Takehara	May 7, 2019
Roswaal begins the class talent show by drawing names and draws assistant teacher Erich first. Erich is confused as to why he must participate but Roswaal encourages him to set an example. Seeing no way out, he decides to perform the Empire's national anthem. Darkness gushes over how he is embarrassing himself. Next, Subaru unveils his string figure of Tokyo Tower and bores the class. Next, Rem activates her oni blood and uses her ball to accurately smash a watermelon. Weiss exclaims that he has no particular talent and starts to undress, but Tanya uses her magic to electrocute and stop him and she apologizes to the class for his actions. Darkness attempts to show off her "strong body" by trying to have Grantz use a whip on her, inadvertently getting the class to belittle Grantz who did not know about her talent act. Aqua attempts to use her Turn Undead on Ainz and his group for her talent act but is smacked by Kazuma again. Roswaal lets Megumin be the last talent act of the day, and the class goes outside to witness her explosion magic. After witnessing her casting, Roswaal decides to end the talent show for the day but Ainz requests that he show off his talent act. Ainz shows off a super-tier snow cast spell and the class looks in awe.
6	6	"Decision! Class Rep"; Transliteration: "Kettei! Iīnkai" (Japanese: 決定！いいんかい)	Minoru Ashina	Mai Nihei	May 14, 2019
Roswaal decides that it is time to select a Class Rep and Vice Rep. Seeing that Ainz, Aqua, and Emilia have elected themselves as candidates, he draws their names and Emilia wins the position of Class Rep. Aqua drops out and Ainz wins the Vice Rep position. Albedo and Shalltear elect themselves as second Vice Rep candidates and Albedo wins the position. In addition to these selections, several classmates have been grouped together into different committees: Animal Care - Subaru, Aura, and Aqua; Disciplinary - Tanya, Demiurge, and Kazuma; Lunch - Ram, Visha; Library - Mare and Beatrice; Gym - Cocytus, Darkness, Weiss, Koenig, and Neumann - Nurse: Rem, and Shalltear - Intercom: Megumin and Grantz. Leaving Roswaal tells them to get along. Roswaal listens to the class from behind the closed door and is approached by Beatrice. She tells him that she finds that the drawings result being fair to be ridiculous and accuses him of tampering the results. Kazuma laments how he finds himself going back to school in yet another world as Demiurge and Tanya each abuse their magical casting powers over him by forcing him onto the ground and making him stand up again against his own will. Tanya declares that she will not accept any foolery as part of the Disciplinary Committee while Demiurge agrees. Cocytus, Darkness, Koenig, Weiss, and Neumann are outside as part of the Gym Committee. Darkness becomes eager to start and begins spewing perverted fantasies to the confusion of the men.
7	7	"Carry Out! Class Rep"; Transliteration: "Suikō! Iīnkai" (Japanese: 遂行！いいんかい)	Minoru Ashina	Minoru Takehara	May 21, 2019
Emilia lands in bed, exhausted from her work as Class Rep. She enjoys that everyone in her new world is unique and has no prejudice at her for being a half-elf. Subaru, Rem, and Beatrice talk about their experiences in their positions while walking to class in the morning. Subaru's experience in the Animal Care Committee with Aura and Beatrice's interaction with Mare as library keepers are discussed. Aura and Mare run to school, briefly meeting the trio. Aura exchange greetings with Subaru before running ahead. Mare greets Beatrice shyly and the two decide to head to the library together. As Megumin and Grantz fight over the intercom, Subaru and Rem arrive in school where they both depart and Subaru meets up with Emilia, Ainz, and Albedo in homeroom. Emilia explains to him that they were discussing ideas on how to get everyone to get along with each other. Ainz introduces himself to Subaru and agrees with Emilia's sentiment, but notices a flame burning within Subaru's chest and attempts to investigate by placing his hand over his chest. Ainz apologizes to Subaru for his intrusion and they both share a laugh together. Roswaal comes into the room and informs the group that the class will be going on a field trip to the beach.
8	8	"Prepare! Field Trip"; Transliteration: "Junbi! Rinkai Gakkō" (Japanese: 準備！りんかいがっこう)	Minoru Ashina	Minoru Takehara	May 28, 2019
Ainz proposes to the class that they all do something together for their beach field trip. Aqua raises her hand in disagreement in part to her prejudice towards him being an undead until Emilia tells her it was her idea, wanting them all to become better friends. Emilia writes down a list of activities the class could do while there and class ends late in the afternoon. Tanya and Viktoriya decide to go shopping to buy swimsuits. They spot Albedo and Shalltear admiring several male swimming suits which they hope to see Ainz wear. Kazuma and Aqua get spotted by the two Floor Guardians, and Aqua and the guardians grow hostile towards each other. Kazuma reminds them that Emilia wants them to become better friends and both parties oblige to cease. Being jogged by Aqua's dialogue thereafter, Kazuma discovers that Albedo is a succubus. Shalltear shares with him the fact that Albedo is a virgin, which embarrasses her. Aqua defends Albedo and says the only thing that nobody should ever do is wear pads in their bras, which stuns and angers Shalltear since she does it, while Albedo laughs hysterically. The commotion is overheard by Tanya and Viktoriya.
9	9	"Enjoy! Field Trip"; Transliteration: "Mankitsu! Rinkai gakkō" (Japanese: 満喫！りんかいがっこう)	Minoru Ashina	Nurutema	June 4, 2019
The class arrives at the beach for their field trip. Kazuma spies on the girls from the bushes while the male 203rd Aerial Mage Battalion members gush over Darkness' chest during push ups. Subaru meets up with Ram and Viktoriya and Ram proceeds to insult him by calling him Barasu when Viktoriya asks for his name. Tanya and Demiurge punish Kazuma for disrupting the peace as a Disciplinary Committee member. Under a medical tent, Shalltear is flustered by seeing Rem's bust and being reminded of her earlier incident with Albedo. Later at night, the test of courage begins. Subaru, Tanya, Ainz and Aqua walk as a tagged group through the event's passage until Aqua stops them and asks the group if they are from Earth. She explains she can tell because she is a goddess who sent Kazuma to his new world. Tanya becomes infuriated, believing Aqua is Being X and discharges her magic in a fit of rage at her. Subaru and Ainz convince her that Aqua and Being X cannot be the same people because they have vastly different personalities. The rest of the class joins them after witnessing the magical spike in the atmosphere.
10	10	"Join In! Rivals"; Transliteration: "Sansen! Rai barutachi" (Japanese: 参戦！らいばるたち)	Minoru Ashina	Yuka Akabane	June 11, 2019
Roswaal announces a field day is coming and the winners will be allowed to return to their worlds. Subaru questions who the class could compete against since there are no other classes. Roswaal corrects him and much to the surprise of Class 2, reveals there's a Class 1 room down the hallway with additional characters from each individual worlds. After class, Subaru, Tanya and Ainz discuss the upcoming field day and the competing strengths of the students from Class 1. Kazuma, Aqua and Darkness discover Chris is a member of Class 1, and in addition to telling them that she has no control over their current situation, reveals to them that they cannot revive if they are killed in their current world. Subaru questions whether his "Return by Death" curse is still in effect in his current world and tests it out, covering Tanya's ears to protect her from dying. Much to the dismay of Subaru, the curse is still in effect. Subaru is then hit by Hamsuke and Death Knight, seemingly by his ability to attract magical beasts. Later in Class 2, everyone announces their intention of doing their best in the upcoming field day to return to their worlds. When Kazuma refutes doing anything to help for being lazy, Tanya uses an initiative to motivate him by having him run outside of school while Puck bombards him using crystal magic.
11	11	"Work Together! Field Day"; Transliteration: "Kyōryoku! Taīkusai" (Japanese: 協力！たいいくさい)	Minoru Ashina	Bonde	June 18, 2019
The field day begins as Yunyun makes an appearance (as the sole member of Class 3) to continue her rivalry with Megumin. The classes face off against each other in a variety of games, but Reinhard's abilities give him a slight advantage over those of Class 2, giving Class 1 a ten point advantage. Finally, the last match is a "cavalry battle" game worth 100 million points, which confuses the students as to why the previous games mattered. Class 2's team of Ainz, Subaru, Kazuma, and Tanya face off against Class 1's team of Chris, Reinhard, Felt, and Julius. However, the teachers suddenly decide to jump into the fight as well, with their own cavalry team of Roswaal, Erich, Vanir, and Pandora's Actor. The 2 student teams decide to team up to fight the teachers. Principal Kurt feels the teachers are at a slight disadvantage and decides to activate a secret weapon from underneath the ground to help them: Destroyer from the KonoSuba world.
12	12	"Band Together! Quartet"; Transliteration: "Danketsu! Karutetto" (Japanese: 団結！かるてっと)	Minoru Ashina	Minoru Takehara	June 25, 2019
Roswaal reveals that Destroyer has a giant headband, and is considered another participant in the cavalry battle. Kazuma tries to use his Steal skill on both Destroyer and the teacher's headband, but to no avail, with Subaru remarking that he wouldn't easily be able to use a "one-shot" ability on a "final boss" character. Class 1's team decides to attack the teachers, leaving Class 2's team to combine their abilities to get Tanya on top of Destroyer's head. After a dramatic finish, Tanya grabs Destroyer's headband and wins the game for Class 2. However, Roswaal does not send them back to their respective worlds, as he only said that they might go home. As the students agree that they are enjoying their experiences in this new world, Roswaal shocks the class by announcing that new transfer students are joining them. The class door opens and the episode ends just before they are able to see the new transfer students.

=== Season 2 (2020) ===
No. overall	No. in season	Title	Directed by	Storyboarded by	Original release date
13	1	"Join the Fight! Transfer Student"; Transliteration: "Sansen! Tenkōsei" (Japanese: 参戦！てんこうせい)	Minoru Ashina	Minoru Ashina	January 14, 2020
Once the door opens, the students meet Naofumi Iwatani, who watches their faces briefly before he closes it and leaves. Roswaal explains that Naofumi will be transferred to Class 1, while the transfer student for Class 2 is actually Chomusuke, and has the others rearrange their seats by a lottery. Naofumi keeps roaming around the school until he meets Wilhelm and explains to him that he was fighting a monster alongside his companions Raphtalia and Filo when he suddenly was transferred to the school and is searching for them since then. Meanwhile, Kazuma and Ainz meet Raphtalia, who is also looking for Naofumi while Subaru and Aura find Filo with the other pets and start riding her. With the other students playing baseball together, Raphtalia eventually reunites with Filo and just when the two are about to be hit by a stray ball from Mare, Naofumi arrives and uses his shield to protect them. With the three reunited, Naofumi, Raphtalia, and Filo decide to stay at the school with the others until they find a way back to their own world.
14	2	"Sneak In! The Principal's Office"; Transliteration: "Sennyū! Kō chōshitsu" (Japanese: 潜入！こうちょうしつ)	Minoru Ashina	A.e.Suck	January 21, 2020
Kazuma Satou, Vooren Grantz, Wilibald Koenig, and Rhiner Neumann are all reminiscing about "red stuff". After hearing that there might be some in the Principal's Office, the group decide to head there after class and try their luck, but are suddenly joined by Aqua who has terrible luck. Inside the Principal's Office, Aqua grabs a bottle of the "red stuff" and unwittingly sets off a security system, forcing the group to disarm the traps. After they disarm the traps, the system then summons four giant toads from the Konosuba world. With five people in the heist group, Tanya's comrades sacrifice themselves to save Aqua, but Kazuma uses his stealth skill and the last toad chases Aqua through the hallway. Kazuma grabs the bottle of "red stuff" just as Roswaal appears, giving everyone in the group detention.
15	3	"Uh-Oh! Detention!"; Transliteration: "Hansei! Shi-dōshitsu" (Japanese: 反省！しどうしつ)	Minoru Ashina	Bonde	January 28, 2020
Kazuma, Aqua, and the three members of Tanya's unit involved in the heist undergo a hellish detention with demonic bugs entering their bodies. Emilia asks if there is a way to end their detention faster, and hears that they might be able to get out if they perform a "good deed". Later, in science class, Megumin creates a miniature explosion with her classmates' help, blowing up the water pipes and flooding part of the school. The detention group uses their magic powers to divert the flood away from the Principal and the school, earning his favor and getting themselves out of detention early.
16	4	"Pinch! Test of Learning"; Transliteration: "Kyūchi! Gakuryoku tesuto" (Japanese: 窮地！ がくりょくてすと)	Minoru Ashina	Minoru Takehara	February 4, 2020
Class 2 will have an SAT-style test, so everybody has study sessions. During the test, Ainz is nervous because he was a slacker in school, so he tries to cheat by freezing time so he can copy answers. He is shocked when Aqua, Tanya, and Subaru are still able to move in frozen time. The three wander the room wondering what is going on because Ainz pretends to also be frozen. When the time freeze ends, everybody is able to quickly return to their seats except for Aqua, whom Roswaal accuses of cheating and fails. Ainz, after solving only the simple questions, discovers that the right answer bubbles form the image of Pandora's Actor's (who made the test) head. He completes the head and gets 100%.
17	5	"Work Hard! Valentine's Day"; Transliteration: "Kinben! Barentaindē" (Japanese: 勤勉！ばれんたいんでー)	Minoru Ashina	Minoru Takehara	February 11, 2020
It is Valentine's Day and the students who haven't heard of it are informed of the tradition of giving chocolates to loved ones. Petelgeuse Romanee-Conti breaks into the school and decides to help Albedo make chocolates for Ainz until he is caught and kicked out for trespassing. Weiss simply wants chocolate (having not eaten it in years due to the war in his world) and believes Kazuma's lie that a man can simply demand chocolates from girls. Trying it results in the girls beating Weiss up. The students give chocolates to their loved ones, but Ainz laments that his skeletal lich body renders him physically incapable of eating (In the English dub, he is allergic to chocolates).
18	6	"Clash! Dodgeball!"; Transliteration: "Gekitotsu! Dojjiboru" (Japanese: 激突！どっじぼーる)	Minoru Ashina	Mai Nihei	February 18, 2020
Ainz, Tanya, and Subaru argue on the best topping for fried chicken: Ainz prefers ketchup, Tanya prefers salt and pepper, and Subaru prefers mayonnaise. Their classmates take sides and are unable to settle it by voting, so Rerugen tells them to settle it in a three-way game of dodgeball. To even out the teams, Rerugen orders Naofumi, Raphtalia, and Filo to participate. The highly destructive game ends in a draw when the ball bursts. The students agree their argument was foolish and make up, but then start arguing on the best topping for croquettes.
19	7	"Excitement! Physicals Day"; Transliteration: "Kōfun! Shintaisoku tei" (Japanese: 興奮！しんたいそくてい)	Minoru Ashina	Nurutema	February 25, 2020
It is time for the school physical examination day. Rem and Shalltear are asked to help examine the girls in the nurse's office while Naofumi is asked to help examine the boys in the gym. Albedo and Shalltear try to sneak away and see Ainz naked, but Rem stops them. Kazuma decides to sneak away and see the girls naked, but by the time he does, their examination is already finished. Megumin boasts about how Pandora's Actor complemented her looks as fitting Ainz's aesthetic, causing Albedo to be jealous. Ram becomes upset because Pandora's Actor had been complementing several girls' looks but ignored her.
20	8	"Challenge! Part-Time Job"; Transliteration: "Chōsen! Arubaito" (Japanese: 挑戦！あるばいと)	Minoru Ashina	Bonde	March 3, 2020
The students find out Viktoriya is working multiple part-time jobs after school. They confront her and she explains she is trying to earn enough money to buy the special menu in the cafeteria, which costs 30,000 yen. Intrigued, the other students take part-time jobs as well. Viktoriya eventually earns enough and buys the special menu, but the food looks completely ordinary except for its sheer volume. As Viktoriya happily eats it, the disappointed students decide not to buy it. In the final scene, Destroyer reactivates.
21	9	"Investigate! First Errand"; Transliteration: "Chōsa! Hajimete no Otsukai" (Japanese: 調査！はじめてのおつかい)	Minoru Ashina	A.e.Suck	March 10, 2020
Class 1 will do a school play, so they ask Filo to decide on a theme. She wanders around asking people for suggestions; Ainz's followers suggest a play about Ainz. Meanwhile, Tanya trains Megumin to improve her explosion magic; Tanya teaches her how to blow up a single target without massive collateral damage, but cannot convince her to use a shorter incantation. Mare and Beatrice give Filo a book of fairy tales, but she doesn't know how to read, so she decides to find Naofumi so he can read it to her. Lupusregina gives her outrageous suggestions and gets beaten up by Yuri and Narberal for it, but when Narberal insults Tanya's men, Lupusregina then suggests The Ugly Duckling. After Naofumi reads the story to her, Filo chooses The Ugly Duckling for the play. Naofumi praises Filo, making Raphtalia jealous.
22	10	"Rise Up! School Festival"; Transliteration: "Kekki! Gakuensai!" (Japanese: 決起！がくえんさい!)	Minoru Ashina	Minoru Takehara	March 17, 2020
Roswaal tells Class 2 that a school festival is coming up and they have to set up a food stand and a school play, promising a reward if they do well, but Ainz points out he didn't keep his promise during field day. Weiss and Viktoriya set up the food stand and Weiss is happy to finally have chocolate. Class 2 chooses Cinderella for the play. They draw lots to decide Ram will play Cinderella, Rem will play the Prince, Aqua will play the Fairy Godmother, Shalltear will play the stepmother, Darkness and Demiurge will play the stepsisters, and Ainz, Tanya, Kazuma, and Subaru will play the horses pulling the pumpkin carriage, which infuriates Shalltear who wanted Ainz to play the Prince and herself to play Cinderella. Naofumi is annoyed that he has to play the Ugly Duckling himself. Hamsuke and Death Knight report to the teachers that Destroyer has broken out from where it was buried. The students find an arch they built has been destroyed and Aqua laments that they can't fix it in time for the festival, but Rem assures her they can if they work together. The teachers discuss that regardless of the danger, they will continue testing the students.
23	11	"It Begins! School Festival"; Transliteration: "Kaimaku! Gakuensai" (Japanese: 開幕！がくえんさい)	Minoru Ashina	Minoru Takehara	March 24, 2020
As the school festival begins, Seiya Ryuguin and Ristarte from Cautious Hero: The Hero Is Overpowered but Overly Cautious arrive, but the overly cautious Seiya refuses to enter the unfamiliar school and leaves to Ristarte's chagrin. For Class 3's play, Yunyun performs The Little Match Girl all by herself. Destroyer attacks the school, but Roswaal refuses to let Classes 1 and 2 fight it until their plays are done. Emilia, Puck, Albedo, Aqua, and Viktoriya volunteer to fight it, then Naofumi gives Raphtalia and Filo permission to fight it as well. Kazuma asks Megumin to take Aqua's place as the Fairy Godmother, but she refuses until Ainz and Tanya goad her into it. The volunteers make their stand against Destroyer.
24	12	"The Show Begins! Showtime"; Transliteration: "Kaien! Shotaimu" (Japanese: 開演！しょーたいむ)	Minoru Ashina	Bonde	March 31, 2020
The Cinderella play hits a few snags because Ram, Darkness, and Megumin cannot let go of their personality flaws, but the play eventually finishes. Aqua creates a flood that Emilia and Puck freezes to immobilize Destroyer, allowing Albedo, Viktoriya, and Filo to heavily damage it. To Aqua's surprise, Destroyer displays some new techniques like missiles from its legs and laser eye beams. Albedo and Viktoriya try to block the lasers with a barrier, but start to get overwhelmed until Raphtalia steps in to absorb them with her sword. Aqua finishes off Destroyer with her God Blow attack. The next day, Class 2 is irritated that they did not get any reward, but Roswaal tells them they can only change the future if they truly come together. The class asks what he means, but he tells them class is in session.

=== Season 3 (2025) ===
No. overall	No. in season	Title	Directed by	Storyboarded by	Original release date
25	1	"Come Together! School Life"; Transliteration: "Kesshū! Gakuen Seikatsu" (Japanese: 結集！がくえんせいかつ)	Minoru Ashina	Minoru Takehara & Minoru Ashina	October 13, 2025
Ristarte opens a portal back to her original world. She speculates on the nature of this world and if it needs protection, but Seiya is unconcerned and drags her through the portal. Albedo got a perfect score on a test and mocks Aqua for her low score. Some characters decide to test Weiss' strength in sumo matches and get Tanya to be referee; she asked Naofumi to do it, but he refused since he is baking Raphtalia and Filo a cake. Weiss is defeated by Garfiel and Albedo, who then decide to face each other. Ainz shares a theory with Roswaal that everyone in this world is actually a copy of the original. Ainz is asked to help because the battle between Albedo and Garfiel is wrecking everything. As Ainz rushes over, Roswaal declares the Dragon, Goddess, Witch, and Being X have no influence in this world. Cid Kagenou lounges somewhere and declares that no matter where he is, he will do what he wants.
26	2	"Lurking! Eminence"; Transliteration: "Senpuku! Jitsuryokusha" (Japanese: 潜伏！じつりょくしゃ)	Minoru Ashina	Bonde	October 20, 2025
Cid and the Seven Shadows join Class 1, where he fades into the background. There is confusion because the Seven Shadows share names with the Pleiades. Naofumi suggests using nicknames, but they are insulted because they were named by Cid and Ainz and consider them as important. Meanwhile, Ainz, Demiurge, Tanya, and Kazuma gather at the school roof and discuss the new students; Kazuma is the only one to notice Cid in the background. Cid is impressed by Ainz's status. Rerugen forbade Megumin from using her Explosion on school grounds, so she goes with Subaru, Emilia, and Beatrice to the nearby forest to cast her spell in the form of fireworks. When Megumin casts it, Cid flies up, absorbs the spell, then casts I Am Atomic, much to her dismay. This creates a fireworks display that a shocked Ainz, Tanya, and Kazuma note is much grander in scale than anything Megumin has done.
27	3	"Working Together! Morning Glories"; Transliteration: "Kyōchō! Asa ga Oshi Iku" (Japanese: 協調！あさがおしいく)	Minoru Ashina	Toyama.	October 27, 2025
Tanya and Demiurge think the stranger who created the fireworks may be a threat. Kazuma says maybe they just wanted to look cool. Class 2 is assigned to raise morning glory flowers. Some like Mare and Garfiel cheat using magic to instantly grow them, making Kazuma jealous. Aqua is displeased to be partnered with Ainz and Shaltear, who say their powers cannot grow plants. Tanya and Ram are unenthusiastic and refuse to participate. Suddenly, the day turns to night and Cid appears in his Shadow guise, claiming responsibility. Cid confronts Ainz before saying some cryptic words and retreating, with the night turning back to day. While discussing the incident, Tanya and Demiurge try to decipher Cid's words, thinking they are some kind of code, but Kazuma says he was just trying to sound cool. They urge him to take this seriously, but Subaru and Ainz agree with Kazuma.
28	4	"Chaos! Cooking Class"; Transliteration: "Konran! Chōri Jisshū" (Japanese: 混乱！ちょうりじっしゅう)	Minoru Ashina	Minoru Takehara	November 3, 2025
Wiz bought an excessive amount of pasta and other unnecessary ingredients for cooking class, leading Vanir to angrily zap her with laser eye beams. Class 2 takes the cooking class and Wiz is suspended from the ceiling as punishment from Vanir. Tanya freaks out when she discovers that the pasta are still alive and wriggling, while the others do not mind. The groups each cook their own unique pasta dishes. When they are about to eat, the pasta comes back to life and becomes golem-like zombies. The class fights back and defeats them. As they clean up, Ainz is annoyed when Demiurge thinks he knows why the pasta reanimated, and Tanya reprimands Visha not to eat the remains of the zombie pasta.
29	5	"Attack! Of the Spear Hero"; Transliteration: "Shingeki! Yari no Yūsha no" (Japanese: 進撃！槍の勇者の)	Minoru Ashina	Toyama.	November 10, 2025
In Class 3, the teacher Kyouhukou tells the only student Yunyun she is finally getting a classmate. It is Motoyasu Kitamura, whom due to his delusions, calls Yunyun a pig, resulting in her slapping him. She is sent to the principal's office for the outburst and the incident is discussed by Class 2, as Motoyasu is calling any girl he sees a pig. Subaru has to explain to Emilia why being called a pig is an insult and Kazuma angers Megumin and Chris by saying they are too flat to be mistaken for pigs. Motoyasu wanders the halls, confused by this world, but is determined to find Filo and Naofumi. He calls Rem and Ram pigs and is beaten up. He then calls Darkness, Shalltear, and Shadow Garden's Epsilon pigs, resulting in them commanding Aura to bury him in the ground. After he digs himself out, Hamsuke tells him Filo and Naofumi are in the music room. He runs into Ainz, Albedo, and Tanya and sees the girls as normal due to mistaking them for filolials because of Albedo's wings and their cowlick hair. He enters the music room and calls all the girls inside pigs, resulting in Reinhard burying him in the ground. It is revealed that Naofumi, Raphtalia, and Filo went home early due to getting an unpleasant feeling when Motoyasu arrived.
30	6	"Search! Shadow and Devil"; Transliteration: "Sensaku! Kage to Akuma" (Japanese: 詮索！かげとあくま)	Minoru Ashina	Toyama.	November 17, 2025
Motoyasu was suspended for his behavior. Tanya suspects Shadow is responsible for the recent strange occurrences, then sees Neuman talking to Cid, whom no one realizes is Shadow. Neuman tells her Cid is completely ordinary, then they and Visha are invited to a picnic by Naofumi and Subaru's groups. Naofumi says he doesn't know what to make of Shadow Garden, then when Tanya wishes to question Shadow Garden's Alpha, Filo turns into her filolial form and drags her and Raphtalia over to her. Alpha and Raphtalia bond over their love for Shadow and Naofumi and frustration of not knowing what they think, then Alpha tells them of Shadow Garden's conflict with the Cult of Diablos. Before leaving, Tanya asks if Cid is part of Shadow Garden, which Alpha denies. Pandora's Actor describes Tanya as a "devil in a little girl's skin", which makes Alpha suspect she is from the Cult of Diablos. The morning glories become too big for their pots and must be replanted, but some become giant sized and require Ainz using his magic to relocate them to the forest. Later, Wiz buries the pasta zombies and eavesdrops on Shadow Garden telling Shadow their suspicions that Ainz and Tanya are from the Cult of Diablos. Shadow says some cryptic words and Shadow Garden scrambles to gather info, except for Delta who did not understand. Shadow says he did not understand either and tells her not to think.
31	7	"Slip-Sliding! Ski Trip!"; Transliteration: "Subette Subette! Sukī Ryokō!" (Japanese: 滑って滑って！スキー旅行！)	Minoru Ashina	Toyama.	November 24, 2025
Class 2 goes on a field trip to a snowy mountain, but Tanya is disappointed that the weather is perfect for activities like skiing and snowboarding as she wanted a test of survival skills. Mare and Aura drag Weiss and Grantz into helping them build an igloo. When Darkness falls down the mountain, Aqua, Puck, Otto, Garfiel, Cocytus, and Tanya's men save her. Tanya's men bat away some snow sprites, attracting a Winter Shogun. Aqua and Darkness warn everyone to put away their weapons and prostrate themselves, but Garfiel and Cocytus refuse. Puck and Otto convince the Winter Shogun to leave. Ainz and Tanya admit the trip is a relaxing diversion and Roswaal claims his purpose is to help the class adjust to school life. Subaru and Beatrice fall down the mountain and everyone goes over to help.
32	8	"Popular! Online Game"; Transliteration: "Ninkinoaru! Onrain Gēmu" (Japanese: 人気のある！オンラインゲーム)	Minoru Ashina	Minoru Takehara	December 1, 2025
Kazuma is absent for the fourth time in a row. Megumin finds and drags him to class, but he immediately tries to leave because he is addicted to an online game. He then falls asleep and is taken to the nurse's office. Ainz also plays the game, Jörmguld, an MMORPG, as much as Kazuma does since he does not require sleep. Kazuma wakes up and complains, but Naofumi scolds him and reveals he plays it as well without letting it cut into his class time. The three discuss the game until Raphtalia and Filo come to eat lunch with Naofumi. Aqua is addicted to the game as well and falls asleep in class. Ainz tells Puck that Jörmguld is not as great as his game, YGGDRASIL. Tanya and Rerugen bring up that multiple students are addicted to the game and are absent or falling asleep, and demand they limit play to one hour a night. However, Rerugen plays it as well and almost falls asleep the next day. Ainz, Kazuma, and Naofumi plan to play and meet a player called Honey Please. Honey Please is Rerugen using a female avatar, who accidentally opens his video chat. When they point out they can see him, he logs off, embarrassed. Meanwhile, the morning glories in the forest continue to grow huge.
33	9	"Get Closer! Music Festival"; Transliteration: "Motto Chikadzukou! Myūjikku Fesutibaru" (Japanese: もっと近づこう！ミュージックフェスティバル)	Minoru Ashina	Toyama.	December 8, 2025
Roswaal tells Class 2 there will be a music festival in a week and offers a button like the ones that brought them to this world as a prize. Ainz, Kazuma, and Tanya tell Subaru about the buttons, since he never pressed one and was unaware of them, but speculate on whether Roswaal's button is real. Shadow Garden confronts them and Alpha accuses Tanya of being part of the Cult of Diablos, then they extend the accusations to everyone in Class 2. Tanya reminds them that violence is not allowed in this world, so they declare that Class 1 will win the music festival and the button, return home, and leave Class 2 stranded. As Class 1 prepares for the festival, Shadow Garden presents their research on Class 2, deeming Ainz, Tanya, Demiurge, and Albedo the biggest threats, but Julius Juukulius insists Subaru is a bigger threat and Chris says Kazuma is one as well. Cid thinks becoming Shadow in the music festival may be fun. Class 2 picks parts for their performance by drawing lots, but Tanya asks them if they really want to go home. She says the war in her world was hellish, but she has a duty to return. Megumin and Darkness want to go back and defeat the Devil King and are outraged when Kazuma and Aqua want to stay. Subaru wants to go back and make Emilia ruler. Ainz says it does not matter where he is as long as his friends are there, but declares they will win to help anyone who wants to go home. They start practicing. That night, the morning glories turn monstrous.
34	10	"Terror! Music Festival"; Transliteration: "Tero! Ongaku-sai" (Japanese: テロ！音楽祭)	Minoru Ashina	Toyama.	December 15, 2025
Petelgeuse tries to sneak into the school, but Sebas throws him out. The music festival starts. Shadow Garden mocks Delta for being untalented at music, but Alpha is missing. Class 3's Yunyun goes first and sings a solo. As Sebas keeps Petelgeuse and Motoyasu out, CZ finds Alpha sulking and admits she feels that Class 2 may win, but they should at least try. Yunyun finishes her song to applause, then Class 2 is up playing instruments. The monstrous morning glories break in and attack. Class 1 and Yunyun find that their powers don't work, but Class 2's powers do and they defeat the flowers while playing. The teachers say their powers were negated to prevent interference. Class 2 puts away their instruments and prepares to sing with Cocytus on piano, but a giant morning glory attacks, then Cocytus panics since his sheet music was destroyed. Shadow relieves him and plays the piano while casting I Am Atomic, blowing up the building. Now they can face the monster in the open air as they start to sing.
35	11	"Melody! Music Festival"; Transliteration: "Merodī! Ongaku-sai" (Japanese: メロディー！音楽祭)	Minoru Ashina	Minoru Takehara	December 22, 2025
Alpha interprets Shadow helping Class 2 to mean they are not the enemy. Class 1 and Yunyun decide to help Class 2's performance as they fight the monster while singing. In the end, Kazuma helps channel Class 2's power into Ainz and he hurls a dodgeball that destroys the monster's core and kills it. Class 2 wins the contest, but everyone agrees it was fun. Roswaal gives Ainz the button. Kazuma invites Class 1 and Yunyun to share it. As they gather around, Ainz tells Subaru to press it since he had not pressed one yet. He presses it, but nothing happens. Aqua grabs it and presses it repeatedly, causing Albedo to restrain her. Ainz, Tanya, Kazuma, and Subaru conclude the button was fake and they are still stuck in this world, but this world is not so bad.
