= Isekai Quartet: The Movie – Another World =

2022 Japanese animated film by Minoru Ashina

- Theatrical release poster
- Kanji: 劇場版 異世界かるてっと ～あなざーわーるど～
- Revised Hepburn: Gekijōban Isekai Karutetto: Anazā Wārudo
- Directed by: Minoru Ashina
- Screenplay by: Minoru Ashina
- Based on: Overlord by Kugane Maruyama; KonoSuba by Natsume Akatsuki; Re:Zero by Tappei Nagatsuki; The Saga of Tanya the Evil by Carlo Zen; The Rising of the Shield Hero by Aneko Yusagi
- Produced by: Kazufumi Kikushima
- Starring: Satoshi Hino; Yumi Hara; Sumire Uesaka; Emiri Katō; Yumi Uchiyama; Masayuki Katō; Kenta Miyake; Jun Fukushima; Sora Amamiya; Rie Takahashi; Ai Kayano; Hitomi Nabatame; Yūsuke Kobayashi; Inori Minase; Rie Murakawa; Satomi Arai; Aoi Yūki; Saori Hayami; Daiki Hamano; Jun Kasama; Daichi Hayashi; Kaito Ishikawa; Asami Seto; Rina Hidaka
- Cinematography: Jun'ichi Ōkubo
- Music by: Ruka Kawada
- Production company: Studio Puyukai
- Distributed by: Kadokawa Animation
- Release dates: June 5, 2022 (Shinjuku); June 10, 2022 (Japan)
- Running time: 112 minutes
- Country: Japan
- Language: Japanese
- Box office: ¥80 million (US$608,374)

Isekai Quartet: The Movie – Another World (Japanese: 劇場版 異世界かるてっと ～あなざーわーるど～, Hepburn: Gekijōban Isekai Karutetto: Anazā Wārudo) is a 2022 Japanese animated film featuring a crossover between the chibi-style characters of the light novel series Overlord, KonoSuba, Re:Zero, The Saga of Tanya the Evil, and The Rising of the Shield Hero, which were published by the divisions of Kadokawa Future Publishing. Produced by Studio Puyukai and distributed by Kadokawa Animation, the film was written and directed by Minoru Ashina. In the film, a wormhole brings Class 1 and 2 students to another world where out-of-control golems exist.

The anime television series Isekai Quartet was set to have a film in July 2021, with Ashina attached to write and direct it. The cast from the anime series was also confirmed to be returning that month, with Minami Tanaka, Nana Mizuki, and Toshiyuki Morikawa joining them in March 2022 to voice the original characters. Additional staff working on the film were also announced that month.

Isekai Quartet: The Movie – Another World premiered in Shinjuku on June 5, 2022, and was released in Japan on June 10. The film grossed ¥80 million in Japan.

== Plot ==
A wormhole suddenly appears inside Class 2's room and absorbs the students there and Class 1 students Naofumi Iwatani, Raphtalia, and Filo who are only visiting. They arrive in another world, except Ainz Ooal Gown and Chomusuke who have arrived first and found themselves inside a facility housing golems that are similar from his world. The students get attacked by a large golem, resulting in them getting split up. The group consisting of Mare Bello Fiore, Aqua, Rem, Ram, Wilibald Koenig, Rhiner Neumann, and Naofumi escapes a swarm of small golems and arrives at a village, where a human named Alec lives. The other group consisting of Shalltear Bloodfallen, Aura Bella Fiora, Demiurge, Darkness, Subaru Natsuki, Puck, Beatrice, Viktoriya Ivanovna "Visha" Serebryakov, and Filo is saved by a girl golem named Pantagruel and brings them to the village, where they reunite with Naofumi's group.

Kazuma Satou, who gets separated from the group alone, follows a girl in a military outfit to the facility and reunites with Ainz. The girl introduces herself as Vera Mitrohina and reveals a sphere device that is capable of traveling between worlds. The three form an alliance to learn about the device. Meanwhile, the other group consisting of Albedo, Cocytus, Megumin, Emilia, Tanya von Degurechaff, Matheus Johann Weiss, Vooren Grantz, and Raphtalia continues to fight a swarm of small golems. At the village, Naofumi and Subaru's groups learn that there is no way home and the golems can be controlled by a ring, but it has been stolen by Vera to bring them back to her world and end the war there. Back at the facility, Vera reveals that they need the "Sign of the Chunibyo" to activate the sphere. After Ainz explained what chūnibyō is and Kazuma pointed out the keyhole looks like an eyepatch, Vera realizes Pantagruel has those features.

Aqua, Subaru, Beatrice, Naofumi, and Pantagruel head out to Tanya's group after their location was found by Visha. Pantagruel confesses about the device at the facility that can bring them home. Upon their return to the village with Tanya's group, Vera takes Pantagruel hostage and reveals to Tanya that she has come from her world and is a spy of the Unified States to the Empire who wants to destroy the latter with golems. Back at the facility, Ainz and Kazuma explore the place when the latter finds a diary of the facility's owner, whom he recognizes as the creator of the Destroyer from his world. Ainz and Kazuma learn that the golem that had destroyed the world where they are now will emerge once the device is activated. Despite the warnings, Vera activates the device, causing the sphere to crack and the golem to emerge.

The students arrive near the facility and fight the golems protecting it. With large golems remaining, the students execute their plan to teleport them inside a large hole and for Megumin to destroy them with her Explosion magic. Kazuma joins his classmates with a golem he found while wandering the forest alone. Inside the facility, Vera learns that Pantagruel can control the golem from the inside, at the cost of her personality ceasing to exist. The students form into small groups to toss Pantagruel toward the golem's left eye. Afterward, the golem, now merged with Pantagruel, destroys its core to reveal the wormhole. Kazuma uses his Steal ability to retrieve Pantagruel from the golem as he enters the wormhole. Pantagruel reunites with Alec and Vera. In a post-credits scene, Subaru finds Garfiel Tinsel and Otto Suwen as transfer students.

== Voice cast ==
- Satoshi Hino as Ainz
- Yumi Hara as Albedo
- Sumire Uesaka as Shalltear
- Emiri Katō as Aura
- Yumi Uchiyama as Mare
- Masayuki Katō as Demiurge
- Kenta Miyake as Cocytus
- Jun Fukushima as Kazuma
- Sora Amamiya as Aqua
- Rie Takahashi as Megumin
- Ai Kayano as Darkness
- Hitomi Nabatame as Chomusuke
- Yūsuke Kobayashi as Subaru
- Rie Takahashi as Emilia
- Yumi Uchiyama as Puck
- Inori Minase as Rem
- Rie Murakawa as Ram
- Satomi Arai as Beatrice
- Takehito Koyasu as Roswaal
- Nobuhiko Okamoto as Garfiel
- Kōhei Amasaki as Otto
- Aoi Yūki as Tanya
- Saori Hayami as Visha
- Daiki Hamano as Weiss
- Yūsuke Kobayashi as Grantz
- Jun Kasama as Koenig
- Daichi Hayashi as Neumann
- Kaito Ishikawa as Naofumi Iwatani
- Asami Seto as Raphtalia
- Rina Hidaka as Filo
- Chō as Professor
- Minami Tanaka as Pantagruel
- Tomoyuki Morikawa as Alec Hoshin
- Nana Mizuki as Vera Mitrohina

== Production ==
In July 2021, an anime film version of the anime television series Isekai Quartet was announced, with Minoru Ashina writing and directing it at Studio Puyukai and Minoru Takehara serving as the character designer and chief animation director. That month, the cast of the anime series were confirmed to be reprising their roles, including Satoshi Hino as Ainz, Yumi Hara as Albedo, Sumire Uesaka as Shalltear, Emiri Katō as Aura, Yumi Uchiyama as Mare, Masayuki Katō as Demiurge, Kenta Miyake as Cocytus, Jun Fukushima as Kazuma, Sora Amamiya as Aqua, Rie Takahashi as Megumin and Emilia, Ai Kayano as Darkness, Yūsuke Kobayashi as Subaru and Grantz, Yumi Uchiyama as Puck, Inori Minase as Rem, Rie Murakawa as Ram, Satomi Arai as Beatrice, Aoi Yūki as Tanya, Saori Hayami as Visha, Daiki Hamano as Weiss, Jun Kasama as Koenig, Daichi Hayashi as Neumann, Kaito Ishikawa as Naofumi, Asami Seto as Raphtalia, and Rina Hidaka as Filo.

In March 2022, Minami Tanaka, Nana Mizuki, and Toshiyuki Morikawa were announced to be voicing the original characters Pantagruel, Vera Mitrohina, and Alec, respectively, while Hitomi Nabatame was set to reprise her role as Chomusuke. That month, additional staff of the film were also revealed, including Yū Saitō as the art director, Hironobu Shinohara for the art setting, and Jun'ichi Ōkubo as the cinematographer, with Kadokawa Animation serving as the distributor.

== Music ==
Ruka Kawada was revealed to be composing Isekai Quartet: The Movie – Another World in March 2022. That month, the theme song for the film was revealed as "Melodic Road Movie" (メロディックロードムービー, Merodikku Rōdo Mūbī), performed by Konomi Suzuki featuring Kashitarō Itō. Written and arranged by Hige Driver, the song is included in Suzuki's album Ultra Flash, which was released in Japan on May 25, 2022.

== Marketing ==
The teaser visual and the promotional video for Isekai Quartet: The Movie – Another World were released in July 2021. The teaser trailer and the main visual for the film were released in March 2022. The main trailer, which features the theme song, was released in April 2022. In June 2022, Fuji-Q Highland announced a collaboration with the film. A bonus novel written by Re:Zero author Tappei Nagatsuki, titled Anazā Wārudo, Anazā Episōdo (あなざーわーるど あなざーえぴそーど; lit. 'Another World, Another Episode'), was given to the filmgoers during the first week of the film's theatrical run. Another bonus novel written by The Saga of Tanya the Evil author Carlo Zen, titled Watashi wa Daredarou ka (私は誰だろうか; lit. 'Who Am I?'), was given during the second week of the film's theatrical run.

== Release ==
=== Theatrical ===
Isekai Quartet: The Movie – Another World had its advanced screening at EJ Anime Theater in Shinjuku, Tokyo on June 5, 2022, and was released in Japan on June 10. The film was screened at the Odex Film Festival in Singapore on September 2–4, 2022, and in Malaysia on September 3.

=== Home media ===
U-Next was the first streaming service in Japan to exclusively stream Isekai Quartet: The Movie – Another World, beginning October 31, 2022. The film was released on Blu-ray and DVD in Japan on November 25, 2022. Crunchyroll began streaming the film on December 22, 2022. The transactional video on demand of the film on streaming services in Japan began on March 1, 2023.

== Reception ==
Isekai Quartet: The Movie – Another World grossed ¥80 million (US$608,374) in Japan. Outside Japan, the film earned $19,133–26,101 in South Korea and $3,496 in Vietnam.

Richard Eisenbeis of Anime News Network graded the film "B-", feeling that it was "full of fun moments and comedic beats—but also manages to delve into a surprising bit of heartfelt drama." Eisenbeis found the film's main theme was centered on "loneliness and lies"–Pantagruel being alone in the world until Alec and Vera's arrival, and the latter feeling being lied by them about a way to return home, where she was also shunned by the community that she grew up in the Unified States due to being born from Imperial parents. He stated that the film "actually feels like a movie" due to its fantasy world setting, unlike the school setting of the anime series. He lauded the cinematography, visual composition, the fight scene at the climax, and the "surprising and interesting connections" found in the film to every original series.
