= Daiki Hamano =

Japanese voice actor

- 濱野 大輝
- Born: Tokyo, Japan
- Occupation: voice actor
- Years active: 2013–present
- Agent: Arts Vision
- Notable work: Chainsaw Man as Samurai Sword/Katana Man; SSSS.Dynazenon as Gauma; I Parry Everything as Noor; Tomodachi Game as Tenji Mikasa

Daiki Hamano (濱野 大輝, Hamano Daiki) is a Japanese voice actor. He is affiliated with Arts Vision.

== Filmography ==
=== Anime series ===
Year	Title	Role	
2014	Yona of the Dawn	Mua	
2014	Shirobako	Gorō Hamasaki, Yūji Atsumi, Zaruyoshi Yakushide	
2015	Aoharu x Machinegun	Watanabe	
2015	Gate	Hitoshi Furuta	
2015	Is It Wrong to Try to Pick Up Girls in a Dungeon?	Guile India	
2015	Mobile Suit Gundam: Iron-Blooded Orphans	Dante Mogro	
2015	The Heroic Legend of Arslan	Pars Citizen, Sanjeh, Soldier	
2016	All Out!!	Hirokuni Kasuga	
2016	Days	Takanobu Hayase, Arima, Mucchan's friend	
2016	Gate season 2	Hitoshi Furuta, Communication soldier	
2016	Mob Psycho 100	Hideki Yamamura, Shirihiko Saruta, Gozo	
2016	Mobile Suit Gundam: Iron-Blooded Orphans season 2	Dante Mogro	
2016	Prince of Stride: Alternative	Hisato Harigaya, Attendant	
2016	Re:Creators	Ryō Yatōji	
2016	Sakura Quest	Mino	
2016	Terra Formars: Revenge	Tatsuhiro Someya	
2017	Altair: A Record of Battles	Colbert	
2017	Black Clover	Valtos	
2017	Clean Freak! Aoyama kun	Kiyoshi Satō, Jinnai-sensei, Kirishima's friend, Narita's father	
2017	Saiyuki Reload Blast	Eijin	
2017	The Idolmaster SideM	Michiru Enjoji	
2017	The Saga of Tanya the Evil	Matheus Johann Weiss	
2017	The Seven Deadly Sins: Revival of The Commandments	Nanashi	
2017	TSUKIPRO THE ANIMATION	Makoto Sugai	
2017	Yu-Gi-Oh! VRAINS	Go Onizuka	
2018	Darling in the Franxx	Goro	
2018	Double Decker! Doug & Kirill	James	
2018	JoJo's Bizarre Adventure: Golden Wind	Luca	
2018	Layton Mystery Tanteisha: Katori no Nazotoki File	young Harry Gilmont	
2018	Mr. Tonegawa	Hidetoshi Nakata	
2018	That Time I Got Reincarnated as a Slime	Biddo	
2019	B Rappers Street	Onepac	
2019	Case File nº221: Kabukicho	Tsujimoto	
2019	Isekai Quartet	Matheus Johann Weiss	
2019	Mob Psycho 100 II	Hideki Yamamura, Shirihiko Saruta, Nozomu Hatori	
2019	The Seven Deadly Sins: Wrath of the Gods	Nanashi, Soldier	
2019	Wise Man's Grandchild	Kent McGregor	
2020	Hypnosis Mic: Division Rap Battle: Rhyme Anima	Rex Taromaru	
2020	Is It Wrong to Try to Pick Up Girls in a Dungeon? III	Guile India	
2020	Isekai Quartet 2	Matheus Johann Weiss	
2020	TSUKIUTA THE ANIMATION 2	Makoto Sugai	
2021	2.43: Seiin High School Boys Volleyball Team	Yorimichi Kuroba	
2021	Mushoku Tensei	Gyes Dedoldia	
2021	Lupin the 3rd Part 6	Eliot Buckingham	
2021	Record of Ragnarok	Chen Gong	
2021	SSSS.Dynazenon	Gauma	
2021	The Seven Deadly Sins: Dragon's Judgement	Nanashi	
2022	Bleach: Thousand-Year Blood War	Luders Friegen	
2022	Chainsaw Man	Samurai Sword	
2022	Salaryman's Club	Shiryū Tonozaki	
2022	Skeleton Knight in Another World	Dakares	
2022	The Case Study of Vanitas	Jean-Jacques	
2022	The Genius Prince's Guide to Raising a Nation Out of Debt	Lachram	
2022	Tomodachi Game	Tenji Mikasa	
2023	Synduality: Noir	Bob	
2023	The Eminence in Shadow	Kouadoi	ep. 10
2023	Technoroid Overmind	Bōra	
Beyblade X	Toguro Okunaga		
2024	Snack Basue	Kawa-chan	
2024	Go! Go! Loser Ranger!	Sōjirō Ishikawa	
2024	Mission: Yozakura Family	Ouga Inugami	
2024	Days with My Stepsister	Tomokazu Maru	
2024	I Parry Everything	Noor	
2025	Betrothed to My Sister's Ex	Kyuros	
2025	Solo Camping for Two	Gen Kinokura	
2025	Digimon Beatbreak	Murasamemon	
2025	Isekai Quartet 3	Matheus Johann Weiss	
2026	A Tale of the Secret Saint	Zachary Townsend	
2026	Magic Repo Man	Guy	

=== Anime films ===
Year	Title	Role
2019	Saga of Tanya the Evil: The Movie	Matheus Johann Weiss
2022	Isekai Quartet: The Movie – Another World	Matheus Johann Weiss
2023	Gridman Universe	Rex

=== Original net animation ===
- Monster Strike (2015), John Manjiro
- Japan Sinks: 2020 (2020), Osamu Asada

=== Original video animation ===
- Yarichin Bitch Club (2018), Yū Kashima

=== Dubbing ===
Title	Role	Dubbing actor	Source
Aquaman	David Kane / Black Manta	Yahya Abdul-Mateen II	
Bumblebee	Dropkick	Justin Theroux	
City on a Hill	Kelvin Campbell	Kameron Kierce	
Extreme Job	Detective Young-ho	Lee Dong-hwi	
The Falcon and the Winter Soldier	Sam Wilson / Falcon / Captain America	Anthony Mackie	
Godzilla vs. Kong	Ben	Chris Chalk	
Good Sam	Dr. Joey Costa	Davi Santos	
Harriet	Gideon Brodess	Joe Alwyn	
I Care a Lot	Alexi Ignatyev	Nicholas Logan	
The Marksman	Mauricio	Juan Pablo Raba	
Midsommar	Josh	William Jackson Harper	
Mortal Engines	Herbert Melliphant	Andrew Lees	
Sonic the Hedgehog	Agent Stone	Lee Majdoub	
Sonic the Hedgehog 2	Agent Stone	Lee Majdoub	
A Star Is Born	Tommy	Gabe Fazio	
Teenage Mutant Ninja Turtles: Out of the Shadows	Carmelo Anthony		
The Trial of the Chicago 7	Bobby Seale	Yahya Abdul-Mateen II	
Trolls Band Together	Cooper	Ron Funches	

=== TV drama ===
- Avataro Sentai Donbrothers: Donblaster (Voice)
- Masters of the Air: Major Gale "Buck" Cleven

=== Video games ===
Year	Title	Role
2016	Yu-Gi-Oh! Duel Links	Go Onizuka
2017	Fire Emblem Heroes	Barts
2018	Alternate Jake Hunter: Daedalus The Awakening of Golden Jazz	Mason
2019	Daemon X Machina	Savior
2021	NEO: The World Ends With You	Shiba Miyakaze
2021	Melty Blood: Type Lumina	Kouma Kishima
2021	Tales of Luminaria	Gaspard Herbet
2021	Alchemy Stars	Wayne Pittman
2021	Valorant	Chamber
2022	Dawn of the Monsters	Eiji Murasame
2022	Dragon Quest Treasures	Monsters
2023	TEVI	Tybrious, Ribauld
2023	Loop8: Summer of Gods	Max Baldur
2023	Final Fantasy XVI	Theodore
2023	Final Fantasy VII: Ever Crisis	Glenn Lodbrok
2023	Silent Hope	King
2024	Final Fantasy VII Rebirth	Glenn Lodbrok
2024	Unicorn Overlord	Magellan
2025	Story of Seasons: Grand Bazaar	Arata
