= Isekai Quartet =

Japanese anime series

- Promotional art, featuring (clockwise from left) Ainz Ooal Gown, Albedo, Subaru Natsuki, Emilia, Aqua, Tanya von Degurechaff, Kazuma Satou, and Viktoriya Ivanovna Serebryakov
- 異世界かるてっと; Isekai Karutetto
- Genre: Comedy, isekai
- Based on: KonoSuba by Natsume Akatsuki; Overlord by Kugane Maruyama; Re:Zero by Tappei Nagatsuki; The Saga of Tanya the Evil by Carlo Zen; The Rising of the Shield Hero by Aneko Yusagi; Cautious Hero: The Hero Is Overpowered but Overly Cautious by Light Tuchihi; The Eminence in Shadow by Daisuke Aizawa
- Written by: Minoru Ashina
- Directed by: Minoru Ashina
- Voices of: Jun Fukushima; Sora Amamiya; Satoshi Hino; Yumi Hara; Yūsuke Kobayashi; Rie Takahashi; Aoi Yūki; Saori Hayami
- Music by: Ruka Kawada
- Country of origin: Japan
- Original language: Japanese
- No. of seasons: 3
- No. of episodes: 35 (list of episodes)

Production
- Executive producer: Daiji Horiuchi
- Producer: Yukiko Ishibashi
- Cinematography: Jun'ichi Ōkubo
- Animator: Studio Puyukai
- Running time: 12 minutes
- Production company: Kadokawa

Original release
- Network: Tokyo MX, MBS, BS11, AT-X; TVA (S1–2)
- Release: April 9, 2019 – December 22, 2025

Related
- Isekai Quartet: The Movie – Another World; KonoSuba; Overlord; Re:Zero; The Saga of Tanya the Evil; The Rising of the Shield Hero; Cautious Hero: The Hero Is Overpowered but Overly Cautious; The Eminence in Shadow

Isekai Quartet (Japanese: 異世界かるてっと, Hepburn: Isekai Karutetto) is a Japanese anime series that is a chibi-style crossover between the light novel series KonoSuba, Overlord, Re:Zero and The Saga of Tanya the Evil, all published by Kadokawa Corporation. The first season aired from April to June 2019. A second season aired from January to March 2020, including characters from The Rising of the Shield Hero and Cautious Hero: The Hero Is Overpowered but Overly Cautious. An anime film set after the second season, titled Isekai Quartet: The Movie – Another World, was released in June 2022. A third season aired from October to December 2025, including characters from The Eminence in Shadow.

== Premise ==
One day, a magic button suddenly appears. The protagonists from KonoSuba, Overlord, Re:Zero, and The Saga of Tanya the Evil all press the button occasionally, unintentionally and move to a parallel world — another brand new isekai — where a new story featuring high school life begins. Soon, they are joined by protagonists from The Rising of the Shield Hero, Cautious Hero: The Hero Is Overpowered but Overly Cautious and The Eminence in Shadow.

== Characters ==
Series	Character	Japanese	English
KonoSuba: God's Blessing on this Wonderful World!	Kazuma Sato	Jun Fukushima	Arnie Pantoja
KonoSuba: God's Blessing on this Wonderful World!	Aqua	Sora Amamiya	Faye Mata
KonoSuba: God's Blessing on this Wonderful World!	Megumin	Rie Takahashi	Erica Mendez
KonoSuba: God's Blessing on this Wonderful World!	Lalatina Dustiness Ford (Darkness)	Ai Kayano	Cristina Vee
KonoSuba: God's Blessing on this Wonderful World!	Chris	Ayaka Suwa	Kira Buckland
KonoSuba: God's Blessing on this Wonderful World!	Vanir	Masakazu Nishida	Anthony Bowling
KonoSuba: God's Blessing on this Wonderful World!	Yunyun	Aki Toyosaki	Kayli Mills
KonoSuba: God's Blessing on this Wonderful World!	Chomusuke	Hitomi Nabatame	Ryan Bartley
KonoSuba: God's Blessing on this Wonderful World!	Wiz	Yui Horie	Brianna Knickerbocker
KonoSuba: God's Blessing on this Wonderful World!	Ruffian	Tetsu Inada	Jeremy Inman
Overlord	Ainz Ooal Gown	Satoshi Hino	Chris Guerrero
Overlord	Albedo	Yumi Hara	Elizabeth Maxwell
Overlord	Shalltear Bloodfallen	Sumire Uesaka	Felecia Angelle
Overlord	Aura Bella Fiora	Emiri Katō	Jill Harris
Overlord	Mare Bello Fiore	Yumi Uchiyama	Megan Shipman
Overlord	Demiurge	Masayuki Katō	Jeff Johnson
Overlord	Cocytus	Kenta Miyake	Bryan Massey
Overlord	Hamsuke	Akeno Watanabe	Heather Walker
Overlord	Yuri Alpha	Hiromi Igarashi	Whitney Rodgers
Overlord	Lupusregina Beta	Mikako Komatsu	Alexis Tipton
Overlord	Narberal Gamma	Manami Numakura	Anastasia Muñoz
Overlord	CZ2128 Delta	Asami Seto	Michelle Rojas
Overlord	Solution Epsilon	Ayane Sakura	Mallorie Rodak
Overlord	Entoma Vasilissa Zeta	Kei Shindō	Tia Ballard
Overlord	Pandora's Actor	Mamoru Miyano	Eric Vale
Overlord	Sebas Tian	Shigeru Chiba	Bill Jenkins
Overlord	Kyouhukou	Hiroshi Kamiya	John Swasey
Re:Zero − Starting Life in Another World	Subaru Natsuki	Yūsuke Kobayashi	Sean Chiplock
Re:Zero − Starting Life in Another World	Emilia	Rie Takahashi	Kayli Mills
Re:Zero − Starting Life in Another World	Puck	Yumi Uchiyama	Erica Mendez
Re:Zero − Starting Life in Another World	Rem	Inori Minase	Brianna Knickerbocker
Re:Zero − Starting Life in Another World	Ram	Rie Murakawa	Ryan Bartley
Re:Zero − Starting Life in Another World	Beatrice	Satomi Arai	Kira Buckland
Re:Zero − Starting Life in Another World	Roswaal L. Mathers	Takehito Koyasu	Ray Chase
Re:Zero − Starting Life in Another World	Felt	Chinatsu Akasaki	Christine Marie Cabanos
Re:Zero − Starting Life in Another World	Reinhard van Astrea	Yuichi Nakamura	Robbie Daymond
Re:Zero − Starting Life in Another World	Julius Juukulius	Takuya Eguchi	Chris Niosi
Re:Zero − Starting Life in Another World	Wilhelm van Astrea	Kenyu Horiuchi	Sonny Franks
Re:Zero − Starting Life in Another World	Petelgeuse Romanee-Conti	Yoshitsugu Matsuoka	Todd Haberkorn
Re:Zero − Starting Life in Another World	Alec Hoshin	Toshiyuki Morikawa	
Re:Zero − Starting Life in Another World	Garfiel Tinzel	Nobuhiko Okamoto	Zeno Robinson
Re:Zero − Starting Life in Another World	Otto Suwen	Kōhei Amasaki	Zach Aguilar
The Saga of Tanya the Evil	Tanya von Degurechaff	Aoi Yūki	Monica Rial
The Saga of Tanya the Evil	Viktoriya Ivanovna Serebryakov (Visha)	Saori Hayami	Jeannie Tirado
The Saga of Tanya the Evil	Matheus Johann Weiss	Daiki Hamano	Daman Mills
The Saga of Tanya the Evil	Vooren Grantz	Yūsuke Kobayashi	Jeff Johnson
The Saga of Tanya the Evil	Wilibald Koenig	Jun Kasama	Chris Wehkamp
The Saga of Tanya the Evil	Rhiner Neumann	Daichi Hayashi	Ben Phillips
The Saga of Tanya the Evil	Erich von Rerugen	Shinichiro Miki	J. Michael Tatum
The Saga of Tanya the Evil	Kurt von Rudersdorf	Tesshō Genda	Greg Dulcie
The Saga of Tanya the Evil	Hans von Zettour	Hōchū Ōtsuka	Mark Stoddard
The Saga of Tanya the Evil	Adelheid von Schugel	Nobuo Tobita	Charlie Campbell
The Rising of the Shield Hero	Naofumi Iwatani	Kaito Ishikawa	Billy Kametz (Season 2); Stephen Fu (Season 3)
The Rising of the Shield Hero	Raphtalia	Asami Seto	Erica Mendez
The Rising of the Shield Hero	Filo	Rina Hidaka	Brianna Knickerbocker
The Rising of the Shield Hero	Motoyasu Kitamura	Makoto Takahashi	Xander Mobus
Cautious Hero: The Hero Is Overpowered but Overly Cautious	Seiya Ryuuguuin	Yūichirō Umehara	Anthony Bowling
Cautious Hero: The Hero Is Overpowered but Overly Cautious	Ristarte	Aki Toyosaki	Jamie Marchi
The Eminence in Shadow	Cid Kagenou (Shadow)	Seiichiro Yamashita	Adam Gibbs
The Eminence in Shadow	Alpha	Asami Seto	Christina Kelly
The Eminence in Shadow	Beta	Inori Minase	Annie Wild
The Eminence in Shadow	Gamma	Suzuko Mimori	Elissa Cuellar
The Eminence in Shadow	Delta	Ai Fairouz	Raven Troup
The Eminence in Shadow	Epsilon	Hisako Kanemoto	Ellen Elise Evans
The Eminence in Shadow	Zeta	Ayaka Asai	Dominique Meyer
The Eminence in Shadow	Eta	Reina Kondo	Genevieve Simmons
Original characters	Pantagruel	Minami Tanaka	
Original characters	Vera Mitrohina	Nana Mizuki	

== Production and release ==
The anime is produced by Studio Puyukai, directed and written by Minoru Ashina, with character designs by Minoru Takehara, who also is chief animation director. The series aired from April 9 to June 25, 2019. Funimation licensed the series and is streaming it in both Japanese and English dubbed. In April 2019, it was added to Crunchyroll's streaming library as well. The opening theme song is "Isekai Quartet" (異世界かるてっと, Isekai Karutetto), performed by Satoshi Hino, Jun Fukushima, Yūsuke Kobayashi and Aoi Yūki, while the ending theme song is "Isekai Girls Talk" (異世界ガールズ♡トーク, Isekai Gāruzu Tōku), performed by Yumi Hara, Sora Amamiya, Rie Takahashi and Aoi Yūki.

Following the final episode of the first season, a second season was announced, with the staff returning to reprise their respective roles, and aired from January 14 to March 31, 2020. The season includes guest appearances of characters from The Rising of the Shield Hero. The opening theme song is "Isekai Showtime" (異世界ショータイム, Isekai Shōtaimu), performed by Hino, Fukushima, Kobayashi and Yūki, while the ending theme song is "Ponkotsu! Isekai Theater" (ポンコツ!異世界シアター, Ponkotsu! Isekai Shiatā), performed by Sumire Uesaka, Rie Takahashi, Inori Minase, and Saori Hayami. Funimation licensed the series for a simuldub. Crunchyroll is also streaming the season. Muse Asia is streaming the season in Southeast Asia.

Following the final episode of the second season, a sequel to the series was announced, which was later confirmed to be an anime film, with returning staff and cast. The film, titled Isekai Quartet: The Movie – Another World, premiered on June 10, 2022. The film's theme song is "Melodic Road Movie" (メロディックロードムービー, Merodikku Rōdo Mūbī), performed by Konomi Suzuki featuring Kashitarō Itō.

A side-scrolling action game, Pixel Game Maker Series Isekai Quartet: Adventure Action Game, was released for Nintendo Switch and Steam on July 17, 2021.

A third season of the anime series was announced on June 13, 2025, and features characters from The Eminence in Shadow, which aired from October 13 to December 22, 2025. The opening theme song is "Isekai Concerto" (異世界こんちぇると, Isekai Konchieruto), performed by Hino, Fukushima, Kobayashi and Yūki, the ending theme song is "Kimi Iro, Boku Iro" (君色、僕色; Your Color, My Color), performed by Suzuki and Itō. Crunchyroll streamed the season and features English voice-over talent from Houston-based Sentai Studios.

== Cultural impact ==
Gadget Tsūshin listed "beautiful Megumin" (Note: A fan nickname for Re:Zero's Emilia who shares the same voice actress with Konosuba's Megumin.) in their 2019 anime buzzwords list.
