= List of Overlord characters =

The floor guardians, with the exceptions of Ainz and Sebas, as they appear in the first light novel. From left to right: Demiurge, Mare, Shalltear, Albedo, Ainz, Sebas, Aura, and Cocytus.

This is a list of characters appearing in the novel series Overlord, written by Kugane Maruyama and illustrated by so-bin, and its anime and manga adaptations.

== Great Tomb of Nazarick ==
The headquarters of the guild Ainz Ooal Gown in YGGDRASIL. After Nazarick is transported to the New World with its NPCs, who gain sentience, Ainz begins to take action to protect the tomb. However, the NPCs believe that he is planning world domination and begin to formulate plans of their own; by the time Ainz realizes their intentions, he has no choice but to go along with what they believed his plans were. This eventually leads to Nazarick becoming its own nation: the Sorcerer Kingdom.

Ainz Ooal Gown (アインズ・ウール・ゴウン, Ainzu Ūru Goun) / Momonga (モモンガ)
Voiced by: Satoshi Hino (drama CD, anime) (Japanese); Chris Guerrero (English)
The leader and sole remaining member of the guild Ainz Ooal Gown. Originally, he was a salaryman named Satoru Suzuki (鈴木悟, Suzuki Satoru) who played the VR online game YGGDRASIL, and was transported to the New World following its shutdown. He decides to make himself a legend in hopes of finding his old guildmates and changes his name from Momonga to Ainz Ooal Gown. While he inadvertently sets Nazarick on the path to world domination after a comment he made is misinterpreted, over time he grows into his role as a leader and aims to create a kingdom where humans and non-humans are equal. Due to having the form of a lich, he does not need to eat or sleep and cannot be poisoned or killed by conventional means. As well, although his emotions and empathy are suppressed, he remembers having a "heart" and so maintains some of his humanity. Because of his formerly high level in YGGDRASIL, he can easily overpower even the strongest of magic casters in the New World; despite lacking the skills of natural warriors, he compensates for it with raw strength. Over time, he learns to improve in fighting with physical weapons, but his greatest asset remains his magic. Ainz also has access to a wide variety of instant death and summoning spells which, though ineffective against fellow players, are effective against the inhabitants of the New World. He also has several items he purchased with real money back in YGGDRASIL, which give him abilities ranging from summoning high-level items from the Guild's bank to instantly casting a spell that usually has a long casting time. When traveling incognito as an adventurer, he uses the alias Momon the Dark Hero.

=== Floor Guardians ===
A group of NPCs who act as the bosses of Nazarick's floors, having gained great influence over its affairs after coming to the New World and gaining sentience. They are among the most powerful beings in Nazarick, with some exceeding Ainz in stats. Their personalities and quirks come from the backstories the creators programmed into them.

Albedo (アルベド, Arubedo)
Voiced by: Yumi Hara (drama CD, anime) (Japanese); Elizabeth Maxwell (English)
A succubus and overseer of the Floor Guardians, whose beautiful appearance hides a dark personality. Shortly before YGGDRASIL was shut down, Ainz modified her to be in love with him as a joke; as a result, she falls in love with him when she arrives in the New World. Despite being a succubus, Albedo is a virgin, which she is ashamed of; however, she wishes to sleep with Ainz despite it being impossible. She despises humans, viewing them as "lower lifeforms", and also harbors hatred towards the members of the Ainz Ooal Gown Guild for leaving Ainz. While in battle, she wears a suit of armor called Hermes Trismegistus, which repels physical damage, and wields a bardiche named 3F. She also possesses the World Item Ginnungagap, which can be used to devastate large areas.

Shalltear Bloodfallen (シャルティア・ブラッドフォールン, Sharutia Buraddofōren)
Voiced by: Sumire Uesaka (drama CD, anime) (Japanese); Felecia Angelle (English)
A vampire and the Guardian of Nazarick's First, Second, and Third Floors. She is said to be somewhat of a pervert and a necrophile, causing her to fall in love with Ainz and putting her at odds with Albedo. She is the most powerful Floor Guardian in terms of overall stats, specializing in both melee and magic combat. After the Slane Theocracy brainwashes her, she rebels against Nazarick until Ainz kills her and she is later resurrected. Afterwards, she blames herself for her actions despite having had no control over herself; while she later recovers from the incident, she is insecure and often belittles herself.

Aura Bella Fiora (アウラ・ベラ・フィオーラ, Aura Bera Fiōra)
Voiced by: Emiri Katō (drama CD, anime) (Japanese); Jill Harris (English)
An energetic and extroverted girl who is the Guardian of Nazarick's Sixth Floor along with her twin brother Mare. She takes on the form of a young Dark Elf and cross-dresses as a boy. Despite their constant bickering, she is close to Shalltear, similar to the relationship between their creators. Along with Mare, Ainz treats them as if they were his children. She wields a whip and bow and can summon beasts to fight with her.

Mare Bello Fiore (マーレ・ベロ・フィオーレ, Māre Bero Fiōre)
Voiced by: Yumi Uchiyama (drama CD, anime) (Japanese); Megan Shipman (English)
One of the Guardians of Nazarick's Sixth Floor along with his twin sister Aura. He takes on the form of a young Dark Elf and cross-dresses as a girl. Unlike Aura, he is shy and quiet, though it is implied that this personality is an act. Along with Aura, Ainz treats them as if they were his children. He specializes in Druid magic and has the ability to manipulate earth.

Demiurge (デミウルゴス, Demiurugosu)
Voiced by: Masayuki Katō (drama CD, anime) (Japanese); Jeff Johnson (English)
The Guardian of Nazarick's Seventh Floor, who is in charge of its defenses. He takes on the form of a demon who wears a business suit and glasses. He is one of Nazarick's most intelligent and evil NPCs, being willing to commit atrocities and manipulate people to further his goals. While he gets along with the other Guardians, his relationship with Sebas is strained due to their opposing natures, which were inherited from the guild members who created them, who were also often at odds. He believes that Ainz determined his schemes and only reveals parts of his true plans to appease the other Guardians' curiosity. He is known to the people of the New World as Jaldabaoth (ヤルダバオト, Yarudabaoto), an alternate identity he assumed to further his goals without raising suspicion, who is referred to as a powerful Demon Emperor leading armies of demons against humanity.

Cocytus (コキュートス, Kokyūtosu)
Voiced by: Kenta Miyake (drama CD, anime) (Japanese); Bryan Massey (English)
The Guardian of the Fifth Floor of Nazarick, who is in charge of Nazarick's security and later the Lizardmen tribes. He takes on the form of a four-armed, humanoid insect. He is noble and respects anyone with strong fighting spirit and is closest to Demiurge, who he sees as a rival and a friend. He has the power of cryokinesis and possesses several weapons.

Victim (ヴィクティム, Vuikutimu)
Voiced by: Nao Tōyama (Japanese); Marla Acevedo (English)
The Guardian of Nazarick's Eight Floor of Nazarick, who speaks the Enochian language. It is Nazarick's last line of defense, with its only ability being a self-destruct skill. Despite this, it is humble and modest, believing its sole purpose is to serve the members of the guild.

Gargantua (ガルガンチュア, Garuganchua)
The Guardian of Nazarick's Fourth Floor. It is a stone golem which, unlike the other Guardians, is not a custom NPC but an in-game bonus Ainz Ooal Gown won. As a result, it was not granted personality or free will upon coming to the New World. Due to its unique nature, it is noted to be the strongest Floor Guardian, but its strength is weakened by its inability to react on its own.

=== Area Guardians ===
NPCs that serve as mini-bosses for a specific portion of a floor. Some of them serve as subordinates to the Floor Guardians, while others act outside the chain of command.

Pandora's Actor (パンドラズ・アクター, Pandorazu Akutā)
Voiced by: Mamoru Miyano (drama CD, anime) (Japanese); Eric Vale (English)
The Area Guardian of Nazarick's Treasury, who Ainz created and is as strong as a Floor Guardian. He has the ability to assume the appearance and abilities of the members of Ainz Ooal Gown, which Ainz uses to have him act as a stand-in when situations require both Ainz and Momon to be active at the same time. Because Ainz created him while going through a chuunibyou phase, he programmed him to act with exaggerated gestures and body language, which now embarrasses him. Despite not being able to spend much time together, he and Ainz share a strong bond, with Ainz allowing him to call him "father".

Nigredo (ニグレド, Niguredo)
Voiced by: Kikuko Inoue (Japanese); Trina Nishimura (English)
The Area Guardian of the Frozen Prison on Nazarick's Fifth Floor, who specializes in information gathering. She is Albedo's older sister, as they were created by the same creator, and they get along well despite being polar opposites in appearance and personality.

Rubedo (ルベド, Rubedo)
Nazarick's hidden super boss and Nazarick's strongest NPC. She is Albedo and Nigredo's younger sister, as they were created by the same creator, and Albedo loves her while Nigredo fears her. Ainz is initially wary of her because she might turn against them, but Albedo assures him that she is as loyal as the other NPCs in Nazarick..

=== Pleiades ===
A group of NPCs dressed as maids, with the exception of Sebas, who resembles a butler. They serve as Nazarick's last line of defense before the final floor. Though they, with the exception of Sebas and Aureole, are relatively weak, their strength is on par with the legendary monsters of the New World. Despite their appearance, Nazarick's denizens see them more as like an idol group than maids.

Sebas Tian (セバス・チャン, Sebasu Chan)
Voiced by: Shigeru Chiba (drama CD, anime) (Japanese); Ed Blaylock (season 1), Bill Jenkins (season 2-4) (English)
The head butler of Nazarick and overseer of the Pleiades, who takes on the form of an elderly gentleman. Although he is not a Floor Guardian, he has abilities on par with them and specializes in unarmed combat. Unlike other NPCs, he does not hate outsiders, and like his creator, Touch Me, has a strong sense of justice. As a result, he has a habit of trying to rescue those in need, which often brings him into conflict with other NPCs and, on occasion, calling his loyalty to Ainz into question. He does not get along well with Demiurge, due to the poor relationship between their creators. In Isekai Quartet, he appears as a school staff member.

Yuri Alpha (ユリ・アルファ, Yuri Arufa)
Voiced by: Hiromi Igarashi (drama CD, anime) (Japanese); Whitney Rodgers (English)
A dullahan who uses a choker to attach her head to her body and appear human. She is the second in command of the Pleiades, who look up to Aureole like a big sister, and in charge of the Sorcerer Kingdom's orphanage, which was built following the war against the Re-Estize Kingdom. She is programmed to behave like a teacher because her creator was one and holds a neutral stance towards humans, as she does not dislike them but does not want to help them either. She wields gauntlets in battle.

Lupusregina Beta (ルプスレギナ・ベータ, Rupusuregina Bēta)
Voiced by: Mikako Komatsu (drama CD, anime) (Japanese); Alexis Tipton (English)
A werewolf who serves as the group's healer. In public, she is sociable and friendly, but in reality she is a psychopath who enjoys using her healing abilities to torture others. Ainz later assigns her to protect Carne Village.

Narberal Gamma (ナーベラル・ガンマ, Nāberaru Ganma)
Voiced by: Manami Numakura (drama CD, anime) (Japanese); Anastasia Muñoz (English)
A doppelgänger who is permanently in human form as a result of investing her levels into combat abilities; she is the strongest of the Pleiades, being a magic caster who specializes in lightning spells. She serves as Ainz's companion while under his "Momon" identity, going by the alias Nabe (ナーベ, Nābe), during which she becomes known as "The Beautiful Princess" due to her appearance and some of the Pleiades become jealous of her due to her closeness to Ainz. She despises and looks down on humans, which often causes trouble for him.

CZ2128 Delta (シズ・デルタ, Shizu Deruta)
Voiced by: Asami Seto (drama CD, anime) (Japanese); Michelle Rojas (English)
An automaton who is silent and emotionless, and as such holds no particular dislike towards humans. She wields guns and war knives and favors long-range combat, and is the only one who knows how to unlock Nazarick's doors. She likes cute things, and is idolized by the homunculus maids.

Solution Epsilon (ソリュシャン・イプシロン, Soryushan Ipushiron)
Voiced by: Ayane Sakura (drama CD, anime) (Japanese); Mallorie Rodak (English)
A slime in human form who is an assassin and can absorb people and objects into her body to be stored or devoured. Being a Slime, she preys on humans and generally despises and looks down on them.

Entoma Vasilissa Zeta (エントマ・ヴァシリッサ・ゼータ, Entoma Vuashirissa Zēta)
Voiced by: Kei Shindo (drama CD, anime) (Japanese); Tia Ballard (English)
An Insectoid who disguises herself as a human by wearing a mask and changing her voice and has the ability to summon other Insectoids. As an Insectoid, she preys on humans when she is hungry, but otherwise does not consider them worthy of her attention. She holds a grudge against Evileye, who defeated and humiliated her, and seeks revenge against her. She is called the "Predator of Family" because she sometimes eats Kyouhukou's family as a snack, which has caused him to be afraid of her.

Aureole Omega (オーレオール・オメガ, Ōreōru Omega)
The secret seventh member of the Pleiades and becomes their leader after Sebas stepped down, as well as the Area Guardian of the Cherry Blossom Sanctuary. She is a human and the only true human in Nazarick as of the beginning of the series. Because of her dual positions, she is often unable to lead the group, with Yuri Alpha serving as leader in her stead. She is in charge of Nazarick's Teleportation Gates. Ainz seems to trust her greatly, as he entrusts her with the Staff of Ainz Ooal Gown when he leaves Nazarick.

=== Five Worst ===
An unofficial group composed of Nazarick's five most disgusting NPCs, who each have something that is considered "the worst".

Kyouhukou (恐怖公, きょうふこう, Kyōfukou)
Voiced by: Hiroshi Kamiya (anime) (Japanese); John Swasey (English)
The Area Guardian of the Black Capsule and a member of the Five Worst, holding the title of "Worst Residence". He is a large cockroach who walks on his hind legs and wears a crown and a cloak and holds a scepter. Despite his appearance, he is polite.

Gashokukochuuou (餓食狐蟲王, Gashokukochuuō)
The Area Guardian of the Large Hole and a member of the Five Worst, holding the title of "Worst Appearance". It is a parasitic creature, and it and its family are currently residing inside of Hekkeran and Imina, two members of Foresight who were defeated and killed during their attempted raid on Nazarick.

Neuronist Painkill (ニューロニスト・ペインキル, Nyūronisuto Peinkiru)
Voiced by: Tesshō Genda (anime) (Japanese); Aaron Dismuke (English)
Nazarick's investigator and torturer and a member of the Five Worst, who holds the title of "Worst Occupation". Her love for Ainz has caused him to avoid her.

Chacmool (チャックモール, Chakkumōru)
Nazarick's musical instructor and a member of Five Worst, who holds the title of "Worst Personality". He views humans as food or toys and commands several Greater Doppelgängers.

=== 9th-Floor ===
NPCs who work as personnel on Nazarick's 9th-Floor. Having been created as part of the scenery, most of them are level 1 and lack abilities.

Pestonya Shortcake Wanko (ペストーニャ・ショートケーキ・ワンコ, Pesutōnya Shōtokēki Wanko)
Voiced by: Satomi Arai (Japanese); Jamie Marchi (English)
The Head-Maid of Nazarick, who has the body of a human but the head of a Shetland Sheepdog. Unlike most of the 9th-Floor's inhabitants, she harbors no dislike towards humans and has abilities, specializing in healing and resurrection magic.

Eclair Ecleir Eicler (エクレア・エクレール・エイクレアー, Ekurea Ekurēru Eikureā)
Voiced by: Nobuyuki Hiyama (Japanese); Kyle Phillips (English)
The assistant butler of Nazarick under Sebas, who takes the form of a rockhopper penguin. His creator programmed him to have a superiority complex and a desire to take over Nazarick as a joke, but instead he has deluded himself into believing that he will be promoted to the position if he works hard enough. Nazarick's inhabitants are aware of his ambitions, as he constantly brags about them, but they do not care as they know that it is part of his settings and he is not a threat.

Clavu (クラヴゥ, Kuravū)
Voiced by: Takuya Satō (Japanese); John Burgmeier (English)
A mushroom dressed as a barkeep who runs a bar on the 9th-Floor. He tries his best to help his customers with their problems; as such, the tomb's denizens often turn to him for help.

Shihoutu Tokitu (シホウツ・トキツ, Shihōtsu Tokitsu)
Nazarick's head chef, an orc who works on the 9th-Floor and provides meals to its denizens. He holds great pride in his job .

=== Supreme Beings ===
Ainz's former comrades and the members of the Ainz Ooal Gown guild whom the NPCs now revere as gods. Unfortunately, they all eventually quit the guild and YGGDRASIL as a whole in order to focus on their lives in the real world.

Touch Me (たっち・みー, Tatchi Mī)
A player who recruited Momonga into the original Nine's Own Goal and is Sebas' creator. Touch Me was a strong believer of justice and honor which stems from his real life job as a policeman. His doctrine "Helping others is just common sense" helps Ainz to retain some of his humanity, even as an undead. His avatar name was a challenge to attempt to land a blow on him, as, according to Ainz, he never lost a single bout. He was the leader of the original Nine's Own Goal clan, but after a particularly nasty argument with another member who quit the game afterwards, he dissolved the clan out of guilt, and chose Momonga as the new leader of the new Ainz Ooal Gown guild. Touch Me was also one of only nine players to hold the powerful "World Champion" title, which he obtained after winning a major YGGDRASIL tournament.
Nishikienrai (弐式炎雷, Nishikienrai)
Narberal Gamma's creator, and original member of Nine's Own Goal. A ninja who possessed high stealth, speed, and attack power to perform quick one-hit kills.
Wish III (ウィッシュIII, Wisshu III)
Bujintakemikazuchi (武人建御雷, Bujintakemikazuchi)
Cocytus's creator, who is also known as "Warrior Takemuchizuki". He was a weapon hoarder and gave Cocytus most of his weapons. His ultimate goal in YGGDRASIL was to defeat Touch Me, often creating swords for this singular purpose.
Ancient One (エンシェント・ワン, Enshento Wan)
One of the original members of Nine's Own Goal. He, along with Takemikazuchi, came up with the idea to raid the Great Tomb of Nazarick, making it the guild's main base.
Flatfoot (フラットフット, Furattofutto)
The guild's assassin who was skilled in scouting and reconnaissance. He also assisted Peroroncino in creating Shalltear.
Amanomahitotsu (あまのまひとつ, Amanomahitotsu)
The blacksmith of the guild. Due to lack of combat abilities, he usually stayed out of fighting.
Ulbert Alain Odle (ウルベルト・アレイン・オードル, Uruberuto Arein Odoru)
Demiurge's creator, who was known for his love of the macabre, which is reflected in Demiurge's artistry. In YGGDRASIL, Ulbert possessed the incredibly powerful "World Disaster" class, which made him one of the strongest offensive spellcasters in the game. In real life, both of Ulbert's parents were killed in an industrial work accident, which resulted in him developing a deep hatred for the world and society, and a fixation for evil. This results in him often clashing with Touch Me, due to their opposite beliefs and upbringings. This is reflected in their creations, Demiurge and Sebas, who also frequently argue with each other.
Peroroncino (ペロロンチーノ, Peroronchīno)
Shalltear's creator and Bukubukuchagama's younger brother. Despite his high archery skills, he had a reputation in the guild for his immature behavior, and his interest in eroge material.
Bukubukuchagama (ぶくぶく茶釜, Bukubuku Chagama)
Marie and Aura's creator and Peroroncino's older sister. In real life, she worked as a voice actress, primarily in eroge media. She and her brother frequently argued with each other, but she would often come out on top in these arguments. The relationship between Aura and Mare seems to reflect her own relationship with Peroroncino.
Herohero (ヘロヘロ, Herohero)
Solution Epilson's creator. During his time in the guild, he assisted Whitebrim and Coup De Grâce in creating the homunculus maids. In combat, he would use powerful acid to dissolve the equipment and weapons of other players. He is the only other member of the guild to log in on YGGDRASIL's final day. His avatar is a slime.
Blue Planet (ブルー・プラネット, Burū Puranetto)
One of the later members of Ainz Ooal Gown, and Clavu's creator. An avid nature lover, he is the creator of the night sky on the 6th floor of Nazarick.
Garnet (ガーネット, Gānetto)
CZ2128 Delta's creator. Thanks to his skills in programming, he created all of Nazarick's traps and gimmicks.
Bellriver (ベルリバー, Beruribā)
A magic knight, and original member of Nine's Own Goal. In real life, Bellriver uncovered vital information about the megacorporations that rule Japan. He was later assassinated to keep it from going public, but before dying, he was able to pass the info over to an unknown individual. He is the only member of the guild known to have died in real life.
Variable Talisman (ばりあぶる・たりすまん, Bariaburu Tarisuman)
Nearata (ねあらた, Nearata)
Nubo (ぬーぼー, Nubo)

A member of the guild known for his high perception abilities to detect any intruders, earning him the title "The Eyes of Ainz Ooal Gown."

Genjiro (源次郎, Genjirō)
Entoma Vasilissa Zeta's creator. He was tasked with organizing and categorizing the many items that the guild obtained.
Yamaiko (やまいこ, Yamaiko)
Yuri Alpha's creator, and one of three female members of Ainz Ooal Gown. Specializing in healing magic, she was known for her kind and gentle personality, despite her rather hideous appearance. She works as an elementary school teacher in real life, and has a younger sister named Akemi who often played YGGDRASIL with her.
Whitebrim (ホワイトブリム, Howaitoburimu)
Designer of the homunculus maids. A mangaka in real life, Whitebrim was infamous for his unhealthy obsession with maids, with his latest manga having a maid as the protagonist.
Punitto Moe (ぷにっと萌え, Punitto Moe)
A cautious player and master strategist, known for his understanding of player behavior. As the main strategist of Ainz Ooal Gown, Punitto Moe's skills played a role in the guild's reputation as an invincible force.
Tabula Smaragdina (タブラ・スマラグディナ, Tabura Sumaragudina)
Creator of Albedo, Nigredo, and Rubedo. Described as a "settings maniac" by Momonga, Tabula was known for being incredibly meticulous in his creations. These include many of Nazarick's traps and security systems, which are said to be very intricate. He was also known for his bizarre interests, including horror movies, the occult, and "gap moe".
Beast King Mekongawa (獣王メコン川, Kemono-ō Mekongawa)
Lupusregina Beta's creator, and original member of Nine's Own Goal. He and Nishikienrai were close friends, often playing together in another game called Aberage.
Tigris Euphrates (チグリス・ユーフラテス, Chigurisu Yūfuratesu)
An original member of Nine's Own Goal. He is named after the two Mesopotamian rivers of the same name.
Temperance (テンパランス, Tenparansu)
Chacmool's creator.
Suratan (スーラータン, Sūrātan)
Ankoro Mocchi Mochi (餡ころもっちもち, Ankoro Mocchi Mochi)
Éclair and Pestonya's creator, and one of three female members of the guild. She appeared to have a fascination for food, and believed that sweets were the answer to ease any tension. She also had a close relationship with her female guildmates, Bukubukuchagama and Yamaiko.
Shizyuutensuzaku (死獣天朱雀, Shijuuten Sujaku)
A university professor in real life, he is supposedly the oldest member of Ainz Ooal Gown. He was known for being an avid fan of PKing due to the stress of his job in real life, often imagining his targets as the students and associates who annoy him.
Luci★Fer (るし★ふぁー, Rushi★Fā)
A guildmember infamous for being a troublemaker who often played pranks on his guildmates. He also created many of the golems scattered throughout Nazarick. The stone lion in the lady's bath attacks Albedo and Shalltear when they attempt to peep; being a leftover prank from Luci★Fer.
Coup De Grâce (ク・ドゥ・グラース, Ku Du Gurāsu)
A guildmember who created the homunculus maids alongside Whitebrim and Herohero.
Yasa Swi (やさ・ スィ一, Yasa Sui Ichi)

== New World ==
=== Nazarick's allies ===
Hamsuke (ハムスケ, Hamusuke)
Voiced by: Akeno Watanabe (drama CD, anime) (Japanese); Heather Walker (English)
A giant hamster with a snake-like tail who is capable of human speech. She lived in the forest near Carne Village and was thought to be the strongest beast among the forest denizens, being known as "The Wise King of the Forest". After learning about her, Ainz seeks her out to increase his fame and defeats and tames her, naming her "Hamsuke". She then joins Ainz's adventurer group as his registered beast and devotes herself to him. While initially arrogant due to being strong by the New World's standards, upon meeting Nazarick's NPCs, she realizes her weakness and devotes herself to becoming stronger.

Tuareninya "Tuare" Veyron (ツアレニーニャ・ベイロン, Tsuarenīnya Beiron)
Voiced by: Yū Shimamura (Japanese); Rachel Glass (English)
Nazarick's newest apprentice-maid under Sebas Tian's supervision. She was a slave of Eight Fingers until Sebas found and saved her while on a mission and nursed her back to health; over time, she opened up to him and developed a crush on him. However, this brings Sebas' loyalty to Ainz into question, and they are forced to appear before him. However, learning about Ainz does not change her feelings towards Sebas, as she is willing to let him kill her to prove his loyalty; however, she is spared, as it turns out this was merely a test. She is later revealed to be the older sister of Ninya Berion, with Ainz taking her under his protection due to feeling indebted to her.

==== Carne Village ====
A small village located at the Re-Estize Kingdom's eastern border, close to where Nazarick resides. The villagers became loyal to Ainz after he saved them from an attack by the Slane Theocracy, and side with Nazarick when it goes to war with the Re-Estize Kingdom and later becomes part of the newly founded nation and part of Ainz' territory after he wins the war. It later comes to be inhabited by other races, including goblins, ogres, and dwarves.

Enri Emmot (エンリ・エモット, Enri Emotto)
Voiced by: M·A·O (anime) (Japanese); Skyler McIntosh (English)
A girl from Carne Village who Ainz saves from soldiers of the Sunlight Scripture, giving her two Goblin-Summoning Horns that she later uses to protect her village. Enri shares a close bond with her childhood friend Nfirea, who later becomes her lover. She and the villagers admire and respect Ainz for saving them from Nigun, and willingly leave the kingdom when the crown prince attempts to force them to join the fight against him. She and Nfirea later marry and move into their own house.

Nemu Emmot (ネム・エモット, Nemu Emotto)
Voiced by: Marika Kōno (anime) (Japanese); Jeannie Tirado (English)
A girl from Carne Village and Enri's younger sister, who Ainz save from soldiers of the Sunlight Scripture. She joins Enri and Nfirea when they are invited to Nazarick for dinner, and is amazed by Ainz's wealth and Nazarick's beauty, and he adds her name to the list of Carne people that Lupusregina must protect. It is later revealed that she moved in with Lizzie after Enri got married.

Nfirea Bareare (ンフィーレア・バレアレ, Nfīrea Bareare)
Voiced by: Ayumu Murase (anime) (Japanese); Morgan Berry (English)
A pharmacist in the city of E-Rantel, who is Lizzie's grandson and Enri's childhood friend and has the innate talent to use any magic item. He is one of the only residents in the New World that knows of Momon's true identity as Ainz, and later manages to create a purple potion from materials from Nazarick and the New World, which he is pleased with. Nfirea harbors romantic feelings for Enri, which eventually come to fruition after they later marry and move into their own house.

Brita (ブリタ, Burita)
Voiced by: Satsuki Yukino (anime) (Japanese); Katherine Bourne (English)
The leader of Carne Village's vigilante committee and a former iron-ranked adventurer. She first encounters Ainz when he accidentally destroys her potion in a tavern and gives her a red potion as compensation. This potion ends up saving her life during Shalltear's rampage since it makes the vampire interrogate her instead of killing her. She quits being an adventurer after encountering Shalltear and moves to Carne Village, where she later joins its people in fighting against the kingdom and for Ainz.

Lizzie Bareare (リィジー・バレアレ, Ryijī Bareare)
Voiced by: Ikuko Tani (anime) (Japanese); Juli Erickson (English)
Nfirea's grandmother, who is considered the best pharmacist in E-Rantel. After Clementine captures Nfirea, she gives up "everything" to Momon in order to save him. She and Nfirea are later sent to Carne Village, where they are told to create a Red Potion from Yggdrasil. They come close by creating a Purple Potion, within their first attempts.

==== Lizardmen ====
A demi-human species with both human and reptilian characteristics. They live in a tribal-like society with five known tribes: Green Claw, Red Eye, Dragon Tusk, Razor Tail, and Small Fang. Nazarick attempts to massacre them to solidify control over the region, but Cocytus, who oversaw the operation, develops respect for them, causing him to instead subjugate them. After Ainz resurrects them, they begin to worship him as a god.

Zaryusu Shasha (ザリュース・シャシャ, Zaryūsu Shasha)
Voiced by: Hiroki Touchi (Japanese); Josh Bangle (English)
A Lizardman of Green Claw and Shasuryu's younger brother, who wields the ice sword Frost Pain. After leaving his tribe to explore the world, he returned with knowledge about cultivating fish. He manages to unify the Lizardman tribes to fight against Ainz, and in the process meets Crusch Lulu, who later becomes his wife. He, along with the other lizardmen, manage to beat Ainz's first attack and later face Cocytus, with him being the last one remaining before being slain. However, Crush requests Ainz to resurrect him, and afterward he comes to view Ainz as a god and swears servitude to him. He later becomes a father to an albino Lizardman.

Shasuryu Shasha (シャースーリュー・シャシャ, Shāsūryū Shasha)
Voiced by: Naomi Kusumi (Japanese); David Wald (English)
Zaryusu's elder brother and chieftain of Green Claw.

Crusch Lulu (クルシュ・ルールー, Kurushu Rūrū)
Voiced by: Sora Amamiya (Japanese); Amanda Lee (English)
An albino Lizard who is Zaryusu's wife and acting chieftain of Red Eye, as well as a powerful magic user. Due to being albino, she would have been abandoned at birth, but her parents raised her to keep her safe. During a famine, her father, the chief, committed fratricide to prevent the death of his people. Unable to bear the shame, Crusch arranged a successful uprising and became Chief. She and Zaryusu meet when he comes to ask for an alliance between Lizardmen, and they fall in love, later marrying and having a son, who is also albino. Following the fight against Cocytus, she becomes a representative for the Lizard people and meets Ainz, who offers to resurrect Zaryusu in return for her acting as an informant to him.

Zenberu Gugu (ゼンベル・ググー, Zenberu gugū)
Voiced by: Kōji Ishii (Japanese); Chris Rager (English)
The chieftain of the Dragon Tusk Tribe, who becomes Zaryusu's close companion after proving his strength in a duel against him. He is bigger than the average Lizardman and his right arm is bigger and more muscular than his left. Like Zaryusu, he was also a traveler.

Kyuku Zuzu (キュクー・ズーズー, Kyukū Zūzū)
Voiced by: Junpei Asashina (Japanese); Brandon Luna (English)
The chieftain of the Razor Tail Tribe, who wears enchanted armor that increases his strength but suppresses his intelligence.

Sukyu Juju (スーキュ・ジュジュ, Sūkyu Juju)
Voiced by: Tooru Sakurai (Japanese); Jason Douglas (English)
The chieftain of the Small Fang Tribe, who is known for being the best ranger among the Lizardmen.

==== Eight Fingers ====
A crime syndicate within the Re-Estize Kingdom that effectively controls it from the shadows. They come into conflict with Nazarick after Sebas saves one of their slaves, Tuareninya, causing Ainz to order their destruction. However, Demiurge sees a use for them and instead takes control of the organization.

Hilma Cygnaeus (ヒルマ・シュグネウス, Hiruma Shiguneusu)
Voiced by: Toa Yukinari (Japanese); Jo Lorio (English)
The leader of Eight Fingers' Drug Department, who was a prostitute and gained her current position by manipulating the nobles she slept with. She is the first member of Eight Fingers that Nazarick abducts and tortures, causing her to swear servitude to them out of fear and sell out the rest of Eight Fingers. After seeing that Ainz is a just and benevolent ruler, the trauma of this experience heals somewhat and she becomes genuinely loyal to him.

Cocco Doll (コッコドール, Kokkodōru)
Voiced by: Yoshimitsu Shimoyama (Japanese); Ian Sinclair (English)
The leader of Eight Fingers' Slave Trade Department within Eight Fingers, who the Re-Estize Kingdom takes into custody after Climb and Brain defeat him. During Eight Fingers evacuation of the kingdom, he is rescued and sent to be tortured into being loyal to Nazarick.

===== Six Arms =====
Eight Fingers' security department, which is disbanded after its members are either killed or taken into custody.

Zero (ゼロ, Zero)
Voiced by: Rintarō Nishi (Japanese); Dave Woodward (English)
The leader of Six Arms, who is known as the "Battle Demon". He specializes in unarmed combat and possesses a skill that temporally grants him the abilities of animals he kills. He develops a one-sided rivalry with Sebas after he humiliates the group, causing him to abduct Tuareninya to lure him into a trap. He later fights Climb and Brain while the other members fight Sebas, but Sebas kills them and then him.

Succulent (サキュロント, Sakyuronto)
Voiced by: Atsushi Imaruoka (Japanese); Chuck Huber (English)
A member of Six Arms, who is known as the "Phantom Demon". He fights using sword skills and illusions. While guarding Cocco Doll, he fights Climb and Brain, and after Brain defeats him, the Re-Estize Kingdom takes him into custody. However, he later breaks out and given a chance to redeem himself, but after Climb defeats him, he is presumably recaptured.

Davernoch (デイバーノック, Deibānokku)
Voiced by: Shunichi Maki (Japanese); Greg Dulcie (English)
An Elder-Lich and a member of Six Arms, who is known as the "Undying King". He possesses several magic items and, unlike most undead, is able to suppress his natural disdain towards the living. When Sebas learns of his title, he kills him in anger, believing it to be an insult to Ainz.

Edström (エドストレーム, Edosutorēmu)
Voiced by: Eriko Matsui (Japanese); Haileigh Todd (English)
The only female member of Six Arms, who is known as the "Dancing Scimitar". She wields floating swords that she can control telepathically and has the ability to use parts of her body independently. Sebas kills her by decapitating her with such speed that she is unaware of her death.

Peshurian (ペシュリアン, Peshurian)
Voiced by: Shōta Yamamoto (Japanese); Randy E. Aguebor (English)
A member of Six Arms, who is known as the "Spacial Slash". He wields a sword and uses a technique called "Dimension Slash", which is a fast slash that is difficult to see due to its speed. He is killed by Sebas after he blocks his technique.

Malmvist (マルムヴィスト, Marumuvuisuto)
Voiced by: Hiromichi Tezuka (Japanese); Tyler Carson (English)
A member of Six Arms, who is known as "Thousand Kills". He wields a rapier that can kill most people in one hit. Sebas kills him after killing the other members of the group.

==== Baharuth Empire ====
A human nation east of Nazarick, which is an absolute monarchy ruled by an emperor that has annual territorial skirmishes with the Re-Estize Kingdom. They are the first nation to make contact with Nazarick; fearing their power, the Emperor accepts them as an independent nation while unsuccessfully attempting to rally other human nations against them. As a result, the Empire submits to Nazarick and becomes a vassal state.

Jircniv Rune Farlord El Nix (Jirukunifu Rūn Fārōdo Eru Nikusu)
Voiced by: Takahiro Sakurai (Japanese); Austin Tindle (English)
The current emperor of the Baharuth Empire, he is calm and pragmatic. However, he purges anyone who gets in his way and replaces them with those he deems more suitable, earning him the nickname "Bloody Emperor". When he learns of Ainz, he plans to use him as a pawn by sending several workers to Nazarick and blaming the Re-Estize Kingdom. However, his plan is discovered, and he is forced to travel to the tomb to apologize to Ainz. After seeing Nazarick's power, he proposes an alliance to prevent them from attacking the Empire, and also plans to form an alliance with the other human nations against Nazarick. However, after they abandon him, he surrenders and submits to Ainz.

Fluder Paradyne (フールーダ・パラダイン, Fūrūda Paradain)
Voiced by: Takaya Hashi (Japanese); Kenny Green (English)
The Empire's imperial court wizard and one of the strongest magic casters in the New World. He aims to see the void of magic and is willing to betray anyone to achieve this goal. Upon meeting Ainz and seeing his tenth-tier magic aura, he immediately swears loyalty to him. Ainz explains that his "teachings" include translating the YGGDRASIL books, claiming new magic must be earned, rather than handed over.

==== Dwarf Kingdom ====
A nation of dwarves living in the Azerlisia Mountains, north of Nazarick. They are a mobile nation made up mostly of miners, with everything mined belonging to the state. Ainz makes a trade deal with the nation in exchange for reclaiming their former capital, which was occupied by Frost Dragons and the demi-human Quagoa.

Gondo Firebeard (ゴンド・ファイアビアド, Gondo Faiabiado)
Voiced by: Mitsuaki Kanuka
A miner, craftsman, and explorer who is somewhat antisocial, as he does not feel excited when relaxing with friends, but not introverted. He feels guilty about being unable to use or make runes like his father and grandfather' despite this, he hopes to one day revive runecraft. He and the other runesmiths of the Dwarf Kingdom are given to the Sorcerer Kingdom as part of the treaty between nations and because Ainz wants to learn and understand runes. They currently reside in Carne Village, where they work in secret..

==== Frost Dragons ====
A subspecies of dragons that inhabit the Azerlisia Mountains. In an attempt to build a "Frost Dragon Empire", they take the Dwarf Kingdom's former capital as a nesting ground. Ainz confronts them to reclaim the capital as part of a trade deal with the dwarves, and they eventually swear allegiance to him out of fear after he kills their patriarch.

Hejinmal (ヘジンマール, Hejinmāru)
Voiced by: Yūya Hirose (Japanese); Dallas Reid (English)
A frost dragon and son of the Frost Dragon Lord. Unlike most dragons, who are brute and violent, he is more scholarly. He wears glasses because of his weak eyesight, which was caused by constant reading. When Ainz invades his family's home, the Frost Dragon Lord sends him to fight him, but he surrenders after realizing he is outmatched. After Ainz kills his father, he convinces him to spare the rest of his family.

==== Quagoa ====
A race of mole-like demi-humans who inhabit the Azerlisia Mountains and wage war against the Dwarf Kingdom. After Ainz interferes in the conflict as part of a trade deal with the dwarves and has Aura and Shalltear massacre them, the survivors swear servitude to him to ensure their survival.

Pe Riyuro (ペ・リユロ, Pe Riyuro)
Voiced by: Masaya Matsukaze (Japanese); Phil Parsons (English)
The king of the Quagoa, who has united the tribes under his rule. He has great ambitions for his people, wishing for them to become the sole rulers of the Azerlisia Mountains. To this end, he wages war against the dwares and forges an alliance with the Frost Dragons. However, this results in Quagoa being the Frost Dragons' servants, causing him to conspire against them. After Aura and Shalltear appear before him and tell him to surrender before massacring his brethren, he swears servitude to Ainz.

==== Abelion Hills ====
A vast wilderness inhabited by demi-human tribes who constantly attempt to invade the neighboring Roble Holy Kingdom. Under the alias of Jaldabaoth, Demiurge conquers the Abelion Hills and forces its inhabitants to attack the Holy Kingdom. Ainz later claims the region, officially making it a part of Nazarick. However, most are unaware that this was Demiurge's true plan.

Beebeezee (ピービーゼー, Bībīzē)
The prince of the Zern, a race of earthworm-like demi-humans. After the Demi-Human Alliance captures him, the Zern are forced to fight on his behalf until Neia Baraja and CZ2128 Delta rescue him under the orders of the Holy Kingdom Liberation Army, who the Zern had made a deal with. Afterwards, he and the surviving Zern find refuge with Nazarick. He later returns to aid the Liberation Army in their final battle against the Demi-Human Alliance.

Buser (バザー, Bazā)
The ruler of the Bafolk Tribes, a race of sheep-like beastman, and a member of Demiurge's army, who is notorious for killing many Holy Kingdom soldiers. After the alliance lays siege to the Northern Holy Kingdom, he and his people are tasked with guarding a city that is eventually attacked by the Holy Kingdom Liberation Army, where he faces off against Ainz. Realizing he is outmatched, he offers his loyalty to Ainz, but Ainz kills him, disgusted by his habit of wearing children's skulls as trophies.

Vijar Rajandala (ヴィジャー・ラージャンダラー, Vu~ijā Rājandarā)
The ruler of the Zoastia, a race of tiger-like beastman, and a member of Demiurge's army, who only cares about fighting strong opponents. When the Holy Kingdom Liberation Army reclaims a city, he is part of a force sent to recapture it. While he initially has the upper hand against the Liberation Army, Ainz kills him after he takes to the front lines.

Nasrene Belt Cure (ナスレネ・ベルト・キュール, Nasurene Beruto Kyūru)
The ruler of the Magelos, a race of demi-humans with four arms, and a member of Demiurge's army. She admires strength and seeks to sire Jaldabaoth's offspring. When the Holy Kingdom Liberation Army reclaims a city, she is part of a force sent to recapture it. While she initially has the upper hand against the Liberation Army, Ainz kills her after she takes to the front lines.

Halisha Ankara (ハリシャ・アンカーラ, Harisha Ankāra)
The ruler of the Stone Eaters, a race of demi-humans who eat stones and take on their properties, and a member of Demiurge's army. When the Holy Kingdom Liberation Army reclaims a city, he is part of a force sent to recapture it. While he initially has the upper hand against the Liberation Army, Ainz kills him after he takes to the front lines.

=== Adventurers ===
Members of the international Adventurers Guild., whose work primarily involves hunting monsters and escorting people.

==== Swords of Darkness ====
An adventurer group based in the Re-Estize Kingdom, who join Momon on his first mission while infiltrating the Adventurers Guild. After Clementine and Khajiit kill most of its members, the group is effectively disbanded.

Peter Mauk (ペテル・モーク, Peteru Mōku)
Voiced by: Kazuyuki Okitsu (anime) (Japanese); Clifford Chapin (English)
The leader of the Swords of Darkness, who, along with Lukrut and Dyne, is later killed by Khajiit and turned into a zombie.

Lukrut Volve (ルクルット・ボルブ, Rukurutto Borubu)
Voiced by: Natsuki Hanae (anime) (Japanese); Christopher Wehkamp (English)
The ranger of the Swords of Darkness, who falls in love with Nabe after meeting her. Along with Peter and Dyne, he is later killed by Khajiit and turned into a zombie.

Ninya (ニニャ, Ninya)
Voiced by: Mutsumi Tamura (anime) (Japanese); Lara Woodhull (English)
The magic caster and strategist of the Swords of Darkness, who wants to find the swords of darkness but prioritizes finding her older sister, who was abducted by a noble. After Clementine tortures her to death, Ainz and Nabe discover her body and find that she masqueraded as a man to maintain respect amongst her peers. Sebas later rescues her sister as repayment for the knowledge Ainz obtained about the new world from her diary.

Dyne Woodwonder (ダイン・ウッドワンダー, Dain Uddowandā)
Voiced by: Ryōta Takeuchi (anime) (Japanese); Ben Phillips (English)
The druid of the Swords of Darkness, who, along with Peter and Lukrut, is later killed by Khajiit and turned into a zombie.

==== Blue Roses ====
An all-female adventurer group based in the Re-Estize Kingdom, who were regarded as its strongest adventure group until Darkness arrived.

Evileye (イビルアイ, Ibiruai) / Landfall (国堕とし)
Voiced by: Yumiri Hanamori (Japanese); Stephanie Garrett (English)
Born Keeno Fasris Inberun (キーノ・ファスリス・インベルン, Kīno Fasurisu Inberun), she is a vampire who is Blue Roses' magic caster and its strongest member. She was once known as Landfall, a former member of the Thirteen Heroes who was infamous for destroying the nation of Inveria. She develops a crush on Momon after he saves her from Jaldabaoth but hates Ainz, as she is unaware that they are the same person. She is a main character in The Vampire Princess of the Lost Country, which takes place in an alternate universe where she was the princess of Inveria and travels with Ainz in search of a way to turn her back into a human.

Lakyus Alvein Dale Aindra (ラキュース・アルベイン・デイル・アインドラ, Rakyūsu Arubein Deiru Aindora)
Voiced by: Ami Koshimizu (Japanese); Jad Saxton (English)
The leader of Blue Roses, who uses faith-based magic, including resurrection magic, and wields the demonic sword Kilineiram, one of the legendary "Swords of Darkness" held by one of the Thirteen Heroes. She is close friends with Princess Renner. During Nazarick's invasion of Re-Estize, Lakyus wanted to stay and defend the kingdom, but the other members of Blue Roses wanted to flee. Not wanting to lose their leader, the rest of the group concocted a plan to take her out of the kingdom by force. After drinking drugged tea, Tia and Gagaran attack her, weakening her enough for Evileye to cast mind control on her, allowing the team to escape with Lakyus.

Gagaran (ガガーラン, Gagāran)
Voiced by: Kimiko Saitō (Japanese); Colleen Clinkenbeard (English)
A warrior and a member of Blue Roses. She has a muscular and bulky build, but is ashamed of it and seems to try to deny it by giving herself nicknames like "Lovely Warrior Full of Mystery". She is somewhat vulgar, but is often seen as the "big brother" of the team, and is close friends with Climb, often helping him train.

Tia & Tina (ティアとティナ, Tia to Tina)
Voiced by: Shizuka Ishigami (Tia), Miyu Tomita (Tina) (Japanese); Ariel Graham (Tia), Krystal LaPorte (Tina) (English)
Blue Roses' twin assassins, who have a third sister named Tira. They have the same features and attire, with the only difference between them being the color of their hair ribbons; Tina's is red while Tia's is blue. They were originally hired to assassinate Lakyus but failed; however, rather than kill them, she instead had them join the group.

=== Workers ===
Mercenaries who do similar work to adventurers, but outside of the regulations of the Adventurer Guild. Like adventurers, they do not swear allegiance to a nation.

==== Foresight ====
A worker group based in the Baharuth Empire, whose members left the Adventurer Guild because they disagreed with its politics. They are one of four groups hired to raid Nazarick, but their members are killed in the process.

Arche Eeb Rile Furt (アルシェ・イーブ・リリッツ・フルト, Arushe Ibu Ririttsu Furuto)
Voiced by: Kei Shindo (Japanese); Corinne Sudberg (English)
The magic caster of Foresight. A prodigy with a talent that allows her to see a person's magic potential. She was a noble until Emperor Jircniv stripped her family of their title; her parents, unable to accept this, constantly borrowed money to continue their lavish lifestyle, accumulating debt which she became a Worker to help pay off. Eventually, however, she gave up and planned to run away with her younger sisters. When she and her comrades encounter Ainz while raiding Nazarick, she is the only one of her group to escape, only for Shalltear to kill her. Afterward, Entoma takes her voice after Evileye destroyed her original one. Her fate in the web novel is different, as fans wanted her to survive after Maruyama asked for their opinion. She ends up as Shalltear's toy until Ainz asks for her help to learn about high society; he rewards her with a home on the 6th floor along with her sisters, whom he rescued from slavery..

Hekkeran Termite (ヘッケラン・ターマイト, Hekkeran Tāmaito)
Voiced by: Kaito Ishikawa (Japanese), Michael Jones (English)
The Leader of Foresight, who was expelled from the Adventurers Guild after getting into a fight with a guild master. He wields several weapons, including a dagger, a mace, and a hidden blade, but primarily dual wields two swords. He also holds affection for fellow Foresight member Imina. When he and his comrades encounter Ainz while raiding Nazarick, he tries to trick him into believing that they were sent by his "friends". Ainz, however, knowing that they are lying, murders him and his comrades out of anger.

Roberdyck Goltron (ロバーデイク・ゴルトロン, Robādeiku Gorutoron)
Voiced by: Daisuke Hirakawa (Japanese); Vic Mignogna (English)
The priest of Foresight. He is a kind man who donates most of his earnings to the needy. He became a worker because regulations within the Adventurers Guild and the Temple prevented him from healing those who could not pay for it. When he and his comrades encounter Ainz while raiding Nazarick, he survives but is taken captive to be experimented on for faith-based magic.

Imina (イミーナ, Imīna)
Voiced by: Ayahi Takagaki (anime)(Japanese); Lindsay Jones (English)
The archer of Foresight. She is a half-elf who is strict, but kind to her friends, and is implied to be Hekkeran's lover. When she and her comrades encounter Ainz while raiding Nazarick, Hekkeran sacrifices himself to save her from one of his spells, but her death at Ainz's hands makes his sacrifice in vain.

==== Dragon Hunt ====
A Worker Group based in the Baharuth Empire, who took their name from a dragon they slain. They are one of four Worker Groups hired to raid Nazarick, and while they did not enter the tomb, they are killed by undead while guarding the entrance, effectively disbanding the group.

Parpatra Ogrion (パルパトラ・オグリオン, Parupatora Ogurion)
Voiced by: Chō (Japanese); Bill Flynn (English)
The leader of Dragon Hunt. He is a veteran worker who fights with a spear made from a dragon he and his team slain. He is discreet and prefers to avoid risks, causing him to become suspicious and volunteer his group to guard the entrance as they are raiding Nazarick. Despite this, they are ambushed and killed by a group of undead.

==== Heavy Masher ====
A Worker Group based in the Baharuth Empire which is one of the four Worker Groups hired to raid Nazarick. The group originally consisted of fourteen members, but five die during the raid on Nazarick.

Gringham (グリンガム, Guringamu)
Voiced by: Yasuhiro Mamiya (Japanese); Jim Johnson (English)
The leader of Heavy Masher, who talks in antiquated style to hide his incompetence. While raiding Nazarick, his comrades die after falling prey to the tomb's traps, and he dies after being transported to Kyouhukou's residence, where he is devoured by his cockroaches.

==== Tenmu ====
A Worker Group based in the Baharuth Empire. While a Group in name, aside from the leader, all other members are his elven slaves. They are one of four Worker Groups hired to raid Nazarick; after they disband following Eyra's death. because they did not willingly trespass into Nazarick, Ainz spares the elves and gives them to Aura and Mare.

Erya Uzruth (エルヤー・ウズルス, Eruyā Uzurusu)
Voiced by: Ryōhei Kimura (Japanese); Kyle Igneczi (English)
The leader of Tenmu. He is a chauvinistic warrior who believes in human superiority, owning elven slaves whom he constantly abuses. While raiding Nazarick, he is killed by Hamsuke when she uses him as a training dummy.

=== Re-Estize Kingdom ===
A human nation west of Nazarick, which is being undermined from within by corrupt nobles and crime lords while the Baharuth Empire encroaches on its territory. The nation falls after two wars with Nazarick, who absorbs its territories.

Gazef Stronoff (ガゼフ・ストロノーフ, Gazefu Sutoronōfu)
Voiced by: Hiroshi Shirokuma (anime) (Japanese); Ray Hurd (English)
King Ramposa III's personal bodyguard. Because they do not want a commoner in such a high position, the kingdom's nobles try to limit his actions, such as preventing him from being knighted. In response, the king creates a new title for him: "Warrior Captain", and gives him his own "Warrior Troop" to command. He first meets Ainz while investigating the destruction of several villages and comes to greatly respect him due to him saving Carne Village. They later become enemies when the Kingdom and Nazarick go to war. He dies after challenging Ainz to a one-on-one duel; before he dies, he wishes not to be resurrected if he is defeated, which Ainz honors by casting a spell that nullifies resurrection.

Brain Unglaus (ブレイン・アングラウス, Burein Angurausu)
Voiced by: Koji Yusa (anime) (Japanese); Chad Halbrook, Matthew David Rudd (Season 4) (English)
A warrior turned mercenary who sees himself as Gazef's rival. When Shalltear raids his hideout and slaughters his men, he barely escapes and loses his will to fight, which he regains after seeing Climb withstand Sebas' intense killing intent, now understanding that humans can change and become stronger. When he reunites with Shalltear, who has no memory of him due to mind control, he manages to cut off the nail on her pinky finger, reinforcing his belief that he can still defeat her. Brain personally witnesses Gazef's duel with Ainz and is deeply affected by his death. During Nazarick's invasion of Re-Estize, he refuses an offer to escape, choosing instead to fight Ainz directly. However, before he can fight him. he encounters Cocytus and dies in battle with him. As a sign of respect for his resolve, Cocytus has his Frost Virgin servants freeze his body in ice and taken away for preservation.

Climb (クライム, Climu)
Voiced by: Ryōta Ōsaka (Japanese); Coby Lewin (English)
Princess Renner's personal bodyguard, who she saved when he was a street urchin dying from sickness. As such, he sees his service to her as fulfilling the debt he owes her, and is willing to sacrifice himself for her. He is unpopular because he holds such a position despite being an urchin rather than a commoner. Despite this position, he has no talent for combat, which he compensates for with sheer effort. He eventually meets Sebas, and after persuading him to teach him some of his skills, they become friends, though he remains unaware of his loyalty to Ainz. He also has close friendships with Gazef and Brain, as well as several members of the Blue Roses. During the final stages of Nazarick's invasion of Re-Estize, Climb challenges Ainz to a duel and is killed, then resurrected. After seeing Renner's new demon form, she asks him to become a demon as well so that she will not be lonely, which he accepts.

Renner Theiere Chardelon Ryle Vaiself (ラナー・ティエール・シャルドルン・ライル・ヴァイセルフ, Ranā Tiēru Sharudorun Rairu Vuaiserufu)
Voiced by: Kiyono Yasuno (Japanese); Jessica Peterson (English)
The kingdom's Third Princess, who is known as the Golden Princess for her great beauty and kindness and for bringing positive changes to the kingdom. In reality, however, she is a yandere who, as a result of her overdeveloped mental abilities, makes her manipulative and harbors a obsession for her bodyguard Climb. While she initially influences events behind the scenes to increase Climb's reputation, she later sells out the kingdom to Nazarick in exchange for being transformed into a demon. She later convinces Climb to become a demon as well, so that they can be together for eternity.

Philip Dayton L'Eyre Montserrat (フィリップ・ディドン・リイル・モチャラス, Firippu Didon Riiru Mocharasu)
Voiced by: Yoshitsugu Matsuoka (Japanese); Aaron Campbell (English)
The third son of a low-class noble family of the Re-Estize Kingdom. As a result of family neglect and a lack of education, Philip is incompetent and delusional, often believing himself to be a genius. After the deaths of his siblings, he becomes the family's heir and eventually its new baron, but struggles with finances due to the new trade agreements between the Sorcerer Kingdom and Roble Holy Kingdom. In response, Philip and some of his allies attack one of the Sorcerer Kingdom's food transports, leading the Sorcerer Kingdom to declare war on Re-Estize. Shortly after Re-Estize's destruction, Albedo confronts Philip, having massacred his family and everyone else in his domain, revealing that before his death, his father had personally requested that she use Philip however she wanted as punishment for the trouble he caused. She decides to use him as a test dummy for "information gathering torture techniques" before presumably killing him.

Ramposa III (ランポッサIII, Ranpossa III)
Voiced by: Katsumi Chou (Japanese); Philip Weber (English)
The former king of the Re-Estize Kingdom. An elderly man who truly cares for his people and struggles to keep his nation united amidst political infighting and invasions by other countries while struggling to balance his duties as a king and a father. However, he is later overthrown by his second son, Zanac, amidst the kingdom's second conflict with Nazarick before being killed by his daughter, Renner, after her defection to Nazarick.

Zanac Valleon Igana Ryle Vaiself (ザナック・ヴァルレオン・イガナ・ライル・ヴァイセルフ, Zanakku Varureon Igana Rairu Vaiserufu)
Voiced by: Kouji Fujiyoshi (Japanese); Cris George (English)
The Second Prince of the Re-Estize Kingdom, who wants the throne for himself and has a rivalry with his older brother, Crown Prince Barbro. Though publicly considered to be incompetent, he is quite intelligent and has powerful allies, including Marquis Raeven. He becomes the new crown prince after Barbro is killed during the kingdom's first conflict with Nazarick and later takes up the role of king regent during the second, having overthrown his father after deeming him to be inadequate to handle the situation. After taking the throne, Zanac attempts to negotiate with Ainz in order to stop the invasion. This ultimately fails, but their discussion is enough to gain Ainz's respect, who promises to give Zanac a quick and painless death. He is later assassinated by traitorous nobles, who attempt to surrender to Nazarick by offering his severed head as a peace offering. However, this act enrages Ainz, who decides that no one in Re-Estize is worth saving, and gives the order to massacre everyone left in the kingdom.

Elias Brandt Dale Raeven (エリアス・ブラント・デイル・レエブン, Eriasu Buranto Deiru Reebun)
Voiced by: Takuya Kirimoto (Japanese); Jerry Jewell (English)
One of the highest ranked nobles in the Re-Estize Kingdom. While he is publicly known as an opportunist who uses the Kingdom's political infighting to advance his own agenda, he is actually a patriot who uses his influence to prevent the situation from escalating into a civil war. He retires from politics after being traumatized by the events of the Massacre of the Katze Plains, and Albedo later blackmails him into assisting in Nazarick's war against the kingdom.

Barbro Andrean Ield Ryle Vaiself (バルブロ・アンドレアン・イエルド・ライル・ヴァイセルフ, Baruburo Andorean Ierudo Rairu Vaiserufu)
Voiced by: Taiten Kusunoki (Japanese); Newton Pittman (English)
The Crown Prince of the Re-Estize Kingdom. He is self-centered and short-tempered, and competes with his younger brother, Zanac, for the throne. Eager to prove himself in the Kingdom's war against Nazarick, he tries to join the effort, but is instead sent to Carne Village to gather information. However, after he loses his temper and threatens the villagers, he is driven out and soon after ambushed and tortured to death by Lupusregina.

=== Slane Theocracy ===
A human nation located south of Nazarick. It was founded over 600 years ago by a group known as the Six Great Gods, who are heavily implied to have been Players. It is the strongest human nation and promotes human supremacy and the persecution of other races.

Nigun Grid Luin (ニグン・グリッド・ルーイン, Nigun Guriddo Rūin)
Voiced by: Takehito Koyasu (anime) (Japanese); Phil Parsons (English)
The captain of the Sunlight Scripture, the Theocracy's demi-human extermination unit. He is highly arrogant and self-righteous, having led secret genocides against non-humans. He and his Scripture are hired by corrupt Re-Estize nobles to assassinate Gazef Stronoff, but Ainz thwarts the plot and defeats him. He is then captured and tortured to death by Demiurge.

Black Scripture Captain
Voiced by: Kentaro Tone (Japanese); Mike McFarland (English)
The current leader of the Black Scripture, the Theocracy's strongest military unit.

Antilene Heran Fouche (アンティリーネ・ヘラン・フーシェ, Antirīne Heran Fūshe)
Voiced by: Yukari Tamura (Japanese); Monica Rial (English)
A member of the Black Scripture. She has heterochromia, with one of her eyes being silver and the other being black, and her hair is half silver and half black. She is the illegitimate daughter of Elf King Decem Hougan and Faine, a human woman who was known as the "Ace" of the Black Scripture, making her a half-elf. However, she despises her father and rejects her elven heritage by using her hair to hide her pointy ears. She is arguably the strongest non-dragon inhabitant of the New World and stronger than the Pleiades, but is weaker than the Floor Guardians, as she is defeated by Mare and taken captive by Nazarick.

=== Roble Holy Kingdom ===
A human nation located southwest of the Re-Estize Kingdom. It is a heavily militarized nation that has had to prioritize defending itself against invasions from the neighboring Albelion Hills, which are inhabited by several demi-human tribes. Jaldabaoth briefly controls the nation by uniting the tribes into the Demi-Human Alliance and started invading the country. However, the inhabitants are able to retake their land with the help of the Sorcerer Kingdom, but are unaware that they were behind the invasion.

Neia Baraja (ネイア・バラハ, Neia Baraha)
Voiced by: Yoshino Aoyama (Japanese); Sarah Wiendenheft (English)
A squire and the daughter of Pavel Baraja. She greatly admires her mother, who was a paladin, and aspires to become one herself. She lacks her mother's talent, however, and instead is skilled in archery like her father. Upon meeting Ainz, she comes to share his belief that strength is needed to protect others, and later becomes his guard after he agrees to aid the Holy Kingdom. During her service to him, Ainz provides her with advanced equipment, allowing her to play a central role in the liberation of the Northern Holy Kingdom. After the liberation, she becomes known as the Faceless Preacher and the leader of a cult that worships Ainz and later takes over the northern nation. It makes its creed "Weakness without the drive to improve one's self is a sin, everyone must strive towards the goal of becoming stronger" the new official religion of the North, with Ainz hailed as their new god.

Remedios Custodio (レメディオス・カストディオ, Remediosu Kasutodio)
Voiced by: Hitomi Nabatame (Japanese); Corey Pettit (English)
The former bodyguard of the late Holy Queen Calca and the elder sister of High-Priestess Kelart and the grandmaster of the Paladin Order. She is also a member of the Nine Colors, holding the title of "White". Unfortunately, she is very selfish, arrogant, self-righteous, and driven primarily by emotion, which often prevents her from making hard decisions. After the fall of the Northern Holy Kingdom, she became a captain in the Holy Kingdom Liberation Army. She is prejudiced against demi-humans and distrusts Ainz due to his undead nature, which only increases as he gains the trust and admiration of the citizens. After the liberation, she is demoted by the new Holy King, Caspond, and later killed.

Calca Bessarez (カルカ・ベサーレス, Karuka Besāresu)
Voiced by: Saori Hayami (Japanese); Kelly Greenshield (English)
The former Holy Queen of the Holy Kingdom and the first female monarch in the nation's history, who is skilled at using divine magic. She cares deeply about the well-being of her nation and people, including Demi-Humans, and held no prejudice against Ainz Ooal Gown, viewing him as potentially benevolent. When Jaldabaoth attacked the Holy Kingdom, she battles him, but is taken captive and later dies while in captivity.

Kelart Custodio (ケラルト・カストディオ, Keraruto Kasutodio)
Voiced by: Haruka Tomatsu (Japanese); Molly Zhang (English)
The High Priestess of the Holy Kingdom and younger sister of Remedios, who is a powerful magic user. When Jaldabaoth attacks the Holy Kingdom, she battles him alongside Calca, but they are defeated and she is killed, with her head being taken by a demon and used as a magic source.

Caspond Bessarez (カスポンド・ベサーレス, Kasupondo Besāresu)
Voiced by: Yūya Uchida (Japanese); Bradley Gareth (English)
The current Holy King and the older brother of Calca, who gives up his claim to the throne. After Jaldabaoth attacks to the Northern Holy Kingdom, he is taken prisoner by demi-humans until he is rescued by the "Holy Kingdom Liberation Army". Afterward, he takes command of the Liberation Army and leads it to victory. Unbeknownst to the public, however, the real Caspond is long dead, having been replaced by a döppelganger who serves Demiurge and works to destabilize the Holy Kingdom.

Gustav Montagnés (グスターボ・モンタニェス, Gusutābo Montanyesu)
Voiced by: Hidenobu Kiuchi (Japanese); Brent Mukai (English)
An adjutant of the Paladin Order. Unlike his superior, Remedios, he is a realist who is willing to compromise if necessary. As a result, he often serves as an adviser and a voice of reason to her. After the liberation, he takes the demoted Remedios' place as grandmaster of the order.

Pabel Baraja (パベル・バラハ, Paberu Baraha)
Voiced by: Kohsuke Toriumi (Japanese); Jonah Scott (English)
Neia's father and a soldier in the Holy Kingdom's army, who is an expert archer. He is killed when Jaldabaoth attacks the Holy Kingdom.

Orlando Campano (オルランド・カンパーノ, Orurando Kanpāno)
Voiced by: Masami Iwasaki (Japanese); Phil Parsons (English)
A corporal in the Holy Kingdom's army. He possesses a unique technique that is so powerful that it causes his weapons to break, so he carries up to eight swords so that he has replacements. He is killed when Jaldabaoth attacks the Holy Kingdom.

=== Others ===
==== Thirteen Heroes ====
Legendary figures in the New World who, 200 years ago, defeated a group known as the "Evil Deities," who are implied to have been YGGDRASIL NPCs. At least two members, including the leader, were Players. Despite their name, there were more than thirteen members, but they were not honored because they were not human.

Rigrit Bers Caurau (リグリット・ベルスー・カウラウ, Riguritto Berusū Kaurau)
Voiced by: Masako Nozawa (Japanese); Wendy Powell (English)
A member of the Thirteen Heroes and a former member of the Blue Roses, which she transformed into a top-ranked adventuring group before retiring and having Evileye take her position. She is a necromancer who has used her abilities to extend her life beyond natural limits, and maintains a cheerful and mischievous personality despite her age. She sees Nazarick as a great threat to the New World.

==== Dragon Lords ====
The most powerful dragons in the New World and the strongest beings in the New World. Around 500 years ago, they went to war with a group of Players known as the Eight Greed Kings and lost, causing their kind to be greatly reduced in population.

Tsaindorcus Vaision (Tsuaindorukusu vuaishion)
Voiced by: Jin Yamanoi (Japanese); R. Bruce Elliot (English)
Also known as the 'Platinum Dragon Lord'. He is a True Dragon Lord and son of the Dragon Emperor, as well as a former member of the Thirteen Heroes and councilor of the Argland Council State. He resides at the castle of the former Eight Greed Kings, guarding their magic items to prevent them from falling into the wrong hands. He sees Nazarick as a great threat to the New World. Like his kin, he can use Wild Magic, but due to the players' intrusion and introduction of Tier-Magic influencing the New World, he can no longer use it as well as he used to.

==== Zurrernorn ====
A criminal cult notorious for their use of necromancy and obsession with death. They are led by a group known as the Twelve Executives, who in turn take orders from an individual known as the Night Lich.

Clementine (クレマンティーヌ, Kuremantīnu)
Voiced by: Aoi Yūki (drama CD, anime) (Japanese); Mikaela Krantz (English)
A rogue warrior and a former member of the Slane Theocracy's Black Scripture. She is a psychopath who wears armor made from the medals of Adventurers she has slain. She is not a true member of Zurrernorn, but rather associated with them for protection. Ainz kills her and loots her equipment from her corpse, which mysteriously disappears soon after.

Khajiit Dale Badantel (カジット・デイル・バダンテール, Kajitto Deiru Badantēru)
Voiced by: Minoru Inaba (drama CD, anime) (Japanese); Brad Venable (English)
One of the twelve core members of Zurrernorn. He attempts to turn the city of E-Rantel into an undead city in order to turn himself into an immortal Lich and resurrect his mother. However, Narberal kills him before he can begin his plan. Like Clementine, his body mysteriously disappears after E-Rantel officials retrieve it and take it to their morgue.
