= Jun Fukushima =

Japanese voice actor and narrator (born 1976)

- 福島 潤
- Born: September 4, 1976 (age 50); Ehime Prefecture, Japan
- Occupations: Voice actor, Narrator
- Years active: 1998–present
- Agent: Arts Vision
- Notable credit(s): Yowamushi Pedal as Shoukichi Naruko; Kotoura-san as Yoshihisa Manabe; KonoSuba as Kazuma Sato; JoJo's Bizarre Adventure: Golden Wind as Formaggio

Jun Fukushima (福島 潤, Fukushima Jun; born September 4, 1976 in Ehime Prefecture) is a Japanese voice actor and narrator who is affiliated with Arts Vision. He is well known for his role as Kazuma Sato in the anime/light novel series Konosuba, and for his role as Shoukichi Naruko in Yowamushi Pedal. He has been acting since the 1990s.

== Personal life ==
He is the eldest of three brothers.

He also works as a lecturer at Nihon Narēshon Engi Kenkyūjo.

His first appearance in Niconico live broadcast (for Kotoura-san) have created a huge impact on the Japanese audience, due to the way he acted freely (he was often compared to a comedian by the Japanese audience) during the broadcast, which was completely opposite to the image of the character he voiced previously – Jin Muso from Aquarion Evol. But according to other voice actors (such as Kana Hanazawa and Hiroki Yasumoto), Fukushima is actually a very serious person at the recording studio that barely speaks. His style during live broadcast and radio is likely to be affected by the personality of the characters he voiced.

== Filmography ==
=== Anime ===
Year	Title	Role	Notes
1998	Yoshimoto Muchikko Monogatari	Yokobaeyoshi	
1999	Trouble Chocolate	Saury	
2000	Gear Fighter Dendoh	Garufa Body B	
2000	Gate Keepers	Classmate B	
2000	NieA_7	Station Announcer	episode 8
2000	Boogiepop Phantom	Boy B	episodes 1 and 11
2001	Argento Soma	Operator B	
2001	Offside	Yūji Nishizaki	
2001	A Little Snow Fairy Sugar	Alan, Sam, Thunder Tsukai	
2001	The Family's Defensive Alliance	Comedian, Onlookers B, Passer	
2001	Hikaru no Go	Student	
2002	Aquarian Age: Sign for Evolution	Passer	
2002	Weiß Kreuz	Additional Voices	
2002	Kiddy Grade	Golden hair	
2002	The Twelve Kingdoms	Classmate at desk	
2002	Panyo Panyo Di Gi Charat	Boy painter	
2003	Dokkoida?!	Additional Voices	
2003	Dear Boys	Yuki Nozomi	
2003	D.N.Angel	Yūji Nishimura	
2003	Human Crossing	Wada	
2012	Aquarion Evol	Jin Muso	
2013	Danbōru senki u~ōzu	Itami kyōji	
2013	Kotoura-san	Yoshihisa Manabe	
2013	Yowamushi Pedal	Shoukichi Naruko	
2014	Yowamushi Pedal: Grande Road	Shoukichi Naruko	
2014	No Game No Life	King	
2014	Kenzen Robo Daimidara	Neruson	
2015	Q Transformers: Return of the Mystery of Convoy	Wheeljack	
2015	Shirobako	Shinsuke Chazawa	
2015	Dyueru Masutāzu VSRF	Akagiyama Basara	
2015	Fate/stay night: Unlimited Blade Works	Atrum Galliasta	
2016	Dyueru Masutāzu VSRF	Akagiyama Basara	
2016	KonoSuba	Kazuma Sato	
2016	Super Lovers	Jūzen Kurosaki	
2016	Mysterious Joker	Captain Blue	
2016	Shōnen Maid	Kōji Hino	
2016	Touken Ranbu -Hanamaru-	Urashima Kotetsu	
2017	KonoSuba 2	Kazuma Satō	
2017	Yowamushi Pedal: New Generation	Shoukichi Naruko	
2017	Super Lovers 2	Jūzen Kurosaki	
2017	Re:Creators	Nishio Ōnishi	
2018	Yowamushi Pedal: Glory Line	Shoukichi Naruko	
2018	Hugtto! PreCure	Harriham Harry	Human Form
2018	A Place Further than the Universe	Dai Himi	
2018	JoJo's Bizarre Adventure: Golden Wind	Formaggio	
2018	That Time I Got Reincarnated as a Slime	Gabiru	
2019	Bakugan: Battle Planet	Wynton Styles	
2019	Ace of Diamond Act II	Kazuto Kōtari, Yuto Kōtari	
2019	Isekai Quartet	Kazuma Satō	
2019	The Helpful Fox Senko-san	Mitaka	
2019	Fruits Basket	Makoto Takei	
2019	Kemono Michi	Heat Haze	
2020	Bakugan: Armored Alliance	Wynton Styles	
2020	Science Fell in Love, So I Tried to Prove It	Kosuke Inukai	
2020	Isekai Quartet 2	Kazuma Satō	
2020	Princess Connect! Re:Dive	Charlie	
2021	That Time I Got Reincarnated as a Slime Season 2	Gabiru	
2021	The Slime Diaries: That Time I Got Reincarnated as a Slime	Gabiru	
2021	Vivy: Fluorite Eye's Song	M-00205	
2021	Drugstore in Another World	Reiji Kirio	
2022	Science Fell in Love, So I Tried to Prove It r=1-sinθ	Kosuke Inukai	
2022	Ya Boy Kongming!	Owner Kobayashi	
2023	The Legend of Heroes: Trails of Cold Steel – Northern War	Ivano	
2023	The Dangers in My Heart	Chikara Ōta	
2023	Ao no Orchestra	Osamu Shibata	
2023	KonoSuba: An Explosion on This Wonderful World!	Kazuma Satō	Archival audio from KonoSuba
2023	16bit Sensation: Another Layer	Kiyoshi Gomikawa	
2023	The Vexations of a Shut-In Vampire Princess	Arman Gandesblood	
2023	Undead Unluck	Clothes	
2024	'Tis Time for "Torture," Princess	Kanage	
2024	Snack Basue	Kazama	
2024	KonoSuba 3	Kazuma Satō	
2024	The Fable	Jackal Tomioka	
2024	Kaiju No. 8	Miike	
2024	Chillin' in Another World with Level 2 Super Cheat Powers	Hugi-Mugi	
2024	Suicide Squad Isekai	Cecil	
2025	Witch Watch	Kyōki Saiko	
2026	Sentenced to Be a Hero	Tsav	
2026	Champignon Witch	Claude	
2026	Steel Ball Run: JoJo's Bizarre Adventure	Pork Pie Hat Kid	

=== Animated films ===
Year	Title	Role	Notes
2018	I Want to Eat Your Pancreas	Gamu-kun	
2019	KonoSuba: God's Blessing on This Wonderful World! Legend of Crimson	Kazuma Satō	
2019	The Saga of Tanya the Evil: The Movie	Edgar	
2022	That Time I Got Reincarnated as a Slime the Movie: Scarlet Bond	Gabiru	

=== Original video animation (OVA) ===
Year	Title	Role	Notes
2015	Shirobako	Taguchi	
2015	Aquarion LOVE	Shin Tsukishima	

=== Original net animation (ONA) ===
Year	Title	Role	Notes
2015	Monster Strike	Oragon	
2021	The Way of the Househusband	Kunimi Lieutenant	
2026	JoJo's Bizarre Adventure: Steel Ball Run	Pork Pie Hat Kid	

=== Games ===
Year	Title	Role	Notes
2014	Super Robot Wars Z3: Hell Chapter	Jin Muso	Also Heaven Chapter
2015	Touken Ranbu	Urashima Kotetsu	
2017	Fire Emblem Heroes	Michalis	
2017	Akane-sasu Sekai de Kimi to Utau	Taira no Kiyomori	
2018	Grand Chase: Dimensional Chaser	Kassias Grandiel	Japanese voice-over
2019	Hero's Park	Kao Dylan	
2020	KonoSuba: Fantastic Days	Kazuma Satō	
2021	Final Fantasy XIV: Endwalker	Vrtra	Japanese voice
2023	Puzzle Bobble Everybubble!	Develon	

=== Live-Action ===
Year	Title	Role	Notes
2015	Death Note (2015 TV series)	Ryuk	

=== Dubbing ===
==== Live-action ====
Title	Role	Notes
Thunderbirds Are Go	John Tracy (Replacing Ray Barrett's voice)	DVD Version
Thunderbird 6	John Tracy (Replacing Keith Alexander's voice)	DVD Version

==== Animation ====
Title	Role	Notes
Teen Titans	Soto's Dog	
