= Re:Zero (TV series) =

Japanese anime television series

Re:Zero − Starting Life in Another World
- Re:ゼロから始める異世界生活; Ri:Zero kara Hajimeru Isekai Seikatsu
- Genre: Adventure; Dark fantasy; Isekai
- Based on: Re:Zero by Tappei Nagatsuki (Note: Author) and Shinichirou Otsuka (Note: Illustrator)
- Developed by: Masahiro Yokotani
- Directed by: Masaharu Watanabe (S1–2); Masahiro Shinohara (S3–4)
- Voices of: Yūsuke Kobayashi; Rie Takahashi; Inori Minase; Rie Murakawa; Satomi Arai; Takehito Koyasu; Yūichi Nakamura; Kōhei Amasaki; Nobuhiko Okamoto
- Music by: Kenichiro Suehiro
- Opening theme: List: "Redo" by Konomi Suzuki (S1A); "Paradisus-Paradoxum" by Myth & Roid (S1B); "Realize" by Konomi Suzuki (S2A); "Long Shot" by Mayu Maeshima (S2B); "Reweave" by Konomi Suzuki (S3); "Recollect" by Konomi Suzuki featuring Ashnikko (S4)
- Ending theme: List: "Styx Helix" by Myth & Roid (S1A); "Straight Bet" by Myth & Roid (S1E7); "Theater D" by Myth & Roid (S1E14); "Stay Alive" by Rie Takahashi (S1B); "Memento" by Nonoc (S2A); "Believe in You" by Nonoc (S2B); "Nox Lux" by Myth & Roid (S3); "Ender Ember" by Myth & Roid featuring TK from Ling Tosite Sigure (S4)
- Country of origin: Japan
- Original language: Japanese
- No. of seasons: 4
- No. of episodes: 85 + 2 OVAs (list of episodes)

Production
- Executive producers: Daiji Horiuchi; Noboru Yamada; Ryoki Takagishi; Taiji Misaka; Yoshikuni Murata; Yūichi Oshida (S1)
- Producers: List: Aya Iizuka; Eriko Aoki; Akihito Ikemoto (S1–3); Shō Tanaka (S1–2); Kazuo Ōnuki (S1); Yoshikazu Beniya (S1); Satoshi Fukao (S2–4); Ken Suzuki (S2–4); Mitsuhiro Ogata (S2); Naoto Setoguchi (S3–4)
- Cinematography: Kentarō Minegishi (S1–2); Miori Miyagi (S3–4)
- Animator: White Fox
- Editor: Hitomi Sudō
- Running time: 23–29 minutes; 52 minutes (#1); 90 minutes (#51); 47–57 minutes (S1DC)
- Production company: Re:Zero Partners (Note: A production committee label consisting of various companies)

Original release
- Network: TV Tokyo, TV Osaka, TV Aichi, AT-X (S1); AT-X, Tokyo MX, BS11, TVh, KHB, TV Aichi, KBS Kyoto, SUN, TVQ (S2–4)
- Release: 4 April 2016 – present

Related
- Isekai Quartet (2019–2025); Isekai Quartet: The Movie – Another World (2022)

Re:Zero − Starting Life in Another World (Japanese: Re:ゼロから始める異世界生活, Hepburn: Ri:Zero kara Hajimeru Isekai Seikatsu), often referred to simply as Re:Zero and also known less commonly as Re: Life in a Different World from Zero, (Note: Stylized in sentence case; This alternative English title is featured on the Japanese version of the logo and directly borrowed from the original light novels.) is a Japanese isekai anime television series based on the light novel series Re:Zero − Starting Life in Another World written by Tappei Nagatsuki and illustrated by Shinichirou Otsuka. It premiered on 4 April 2016 and has aired four seasons across television networks such as TV Tokyo, TV Osaka, TV Aichi, and AT-X. The fourth season aired from 8 April to 30 September 2026. A fifth season has been announced.

The series has been streamed by Crunchyroll outside Asia, which released the anime on home media in the United States and through Anime Limited in the United Kingdom. In Southeast Asia and South Asia, the series is licensed by Muse Communication.

== Plot ==
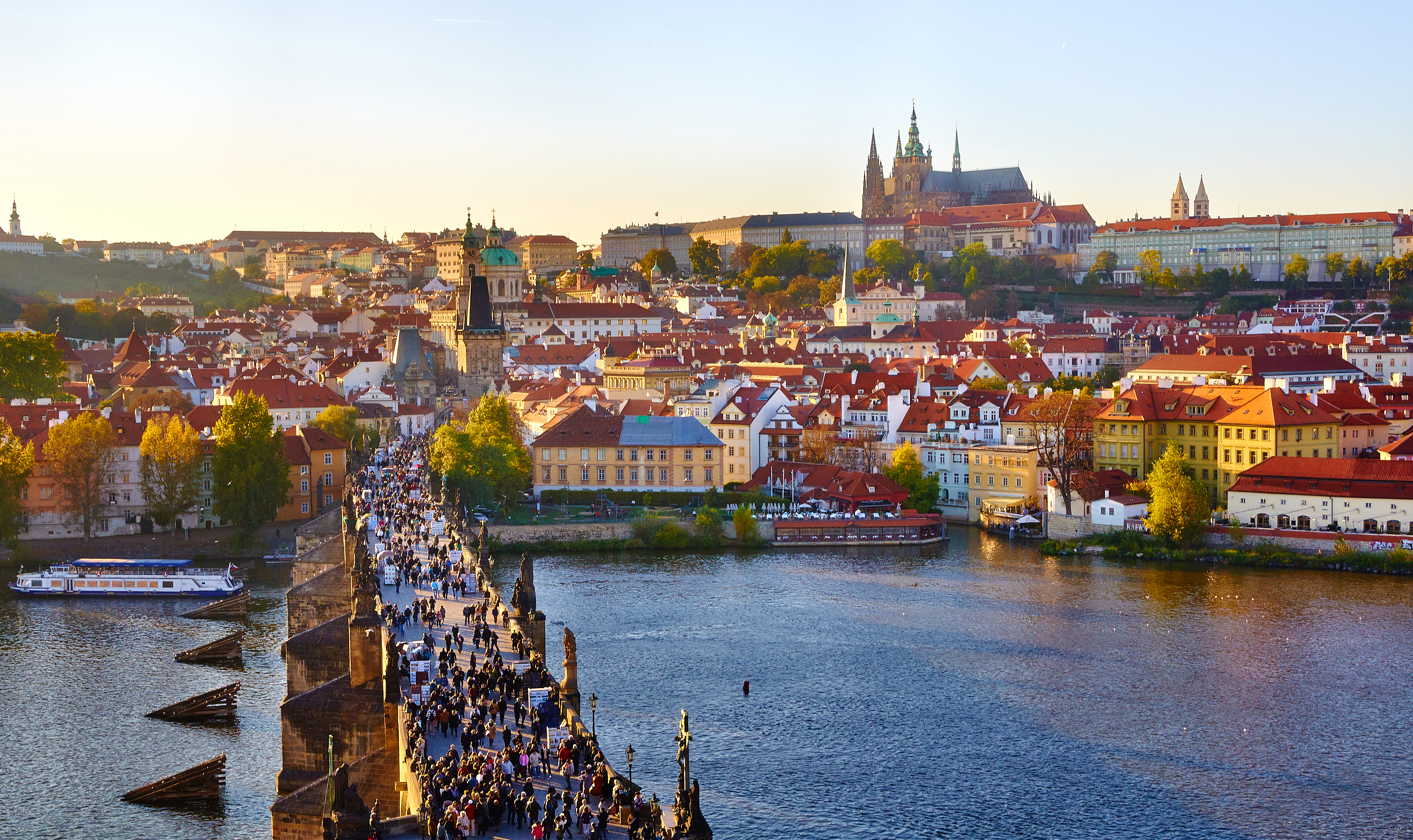
The Kingdom of Lugunica was modelled after Prague

Subaru Natsuki is a NEET who is suddenly summoned to a fantasy-like world. Just after arriving, he is killed while trying to help a young half-elf he befriends, Emilia, who is a candidate to become the next ruler of the Kingdom of Lugunica, only to revive some hours in the past. After dying a few times, Subaru realizes that he has the power to turn back time after his death. After successfully helping Emilia, Subaru starts living in one of the Mansions of Roswaal L. Mathers as a butler. Out of gratitude and affection for Emilia, Subaru makes use of his newfound ability to protect her and help on her ambition to be successfully appointed as the next queen, also providing assistance to other friends he makes along the way, while suffering due to the pain inflicted on him every time he dies, and carrying along the memories of everything that happened before his power activates, which is forgotten by everybody except for him.

Although Subaru is at first only devoted to supporting Emilia, the appearance of the Witch Cult who represent seven deadly sins forces him to fight against them in each "arc" the novel is divided into. As Subaru's relationship with Emilia improves, the protagonist becomes concerned about allies whose memories he can only remember and searches for methods to recover them. He obtains multiple close allies like Garfiel and Otto who force him to depend on others.

== Series overview ==
Season	Episodes		Originally released	
Season	Episodes		First released	Last released
1	25		4 April 2016	19 September 2016
2	25	13	8 July 2020	30 September 2020
2	25	12	6 January 2021	24 March 2021
3	16	8	2 October 2024	20 November 2024
3	16	8	5 February 2025	26 March 2025
4	19	11	8 April 2026	17 June 2026
4	19	8	12 August 2026	30 September 2026

== Cast and characters ==
- Yūsuke Kobayashi (Japanese) / Sean Chiplock (English) as Subaru Natsuki
- Rie Takahashi (Japanese) / Kayli Mills (English) as Emilia
- Inori Minase (Japanese) / Brianna Knickerbocker (English) as Rem
- Rie Murakawa (Japanese) / Ryan Bartley (English) as Ram
- Satomi Arai (Japanese) / Kira Buckland (English) as Beatrice
- Takehito Koyasu (Japanese) / Ray Chase (English) as Roswaal L. Mathers
- Yūichi Nakamura (Japanese) / Robbie Daymond (English) as Reinhard van Astrea
- Kōhei Amasaki (Japanese) / Zach Aguilar (English) as Otto Suwen
- Nobuhiko Okamoto (Japanese) / Zeno Robinson (English) as Garfiel Tinzel

== Production ==
=== Development ===
The possibility of an anime adaptation came up early during development of the light novels; Shō Tanaka, a producer at Kadokawa Corporation, asked Ikemoto about properties which might lend themselves to being animated, and Ikemoto recommended that Tanaka read Nagatsuki's web novels. Despite an initial miscommunication which led to Ikemoto believing that Tanaka was not interested, talks of adapting the series began soon after the web novels began the transition to print.

As part of talks for the potential anime adaptation, Ikemoto and Tanaka spoke to Tsunaki Yoshikawa, an animation producer at studio White Fox, about the possibility of his studio animating the series. Hoping to adapt the series into an anime similar to Steins;Gate (which White Fox also produced), and having a positive impression of the studio as one that did faithful adaptations, Tanaka then formally approached them about producing the show. White Fox's president contacted Yoshikawa for his opinion, and Yoshikawa recommended they accept, as long as the series "doesn't violate any broadcasting regulations."

Production on the anime began sometime after the release of the fifth novel in October 2014. Masaharu Watanabe was chosen by Yoshikawa to direct the series because he had previously worked for the studio doing key animation, while Kyūta Sakai was chosen to be the series' character designer and chief animation director because Yoshikawa felt that she would be able to do the novel's art justice whilst maintaining a consistent animation quality throughout the series' 25-episode run. Masahiro Yokotani was brought on board as the main writer, with the series being his first time composing for a "reborn in another world"-type story. Yoshikawa warned him about the violence in the series, but Yokotani was still surprised by the violent and disturbing scenes in novels three and beyond, having only read the first novel when he agreed to work on the project; he delegated the script writing of those episodes in the second cours to the other two scriptwriters. Yoshiko Nakamura joined the project sometime after Yokotani had completed the script for episode 3. When it proved unfeasible for Yokotani and Nakamura to write the scripts alone, the decision was made to bring another scriptwriter on board. Gaku Iwasa, the president of White Fox, asked them to hire someone "younger", leading Yokotani to suggest Eiji Umehara. Nagatsuki had recently been playing Chaos;Child, which Umehara had written for, and he approved the choice, suggesting that they let Umehara write the "painful parts"; Umehara was invited to join the project around the time that the scripts for episodes 8 and 9 were being written. Re:Zero was the first light novel adaptation that either of the screenwriters had worked on.

Original author Tappei Nagatsuki was very active in the production of the anime, attending script meetings and recording sessions. When the staff would encounter a problem with a scene, he would occasionally write lines for them to use as reference while writing the script. The series was not initially intended to have 25 episodes, but was extended to give more time to the battle with the White Whale (which was expanded from two to three episodes) and to the content of episode 18 (episodes 16 to 18 were originally supposed to be covered in two episodes). Watanabe's main directive to the staff was to "capture the mood of the novel as much as possible"; the scriptwriters had discussions about how to compress the dense source material without losing the central elements of the story, and Nakamura recalls working with composition notes that "went on for pages". While planning and scripting the anime, choosing a proper conclusion was one of the most difficult parts for the staff, and a significant amount of time was devoted to choosing what to cover in the final episode, which included material not yet covered in the light novel. (Note: The episode, which was released on 19 September 2016, included material from the ninth novel, which was released four days later on 23 September 2016.)

After joining the project, both Nakamura and Umehara had to adjust their views of the main character, and were forced to rewrite scenes where they had made Subaru appear "cool". At Watanabe's direction, Nakamura was made to rewrite Subaru's telling of The Red Ogre Who Cried in episode 6 multiple times. The staff also had difficulty deciding on a song to use for Subaru's ringtone that plays during the closing scene of episode 19, considering songs like "Kanpaku Sengen", "The Beard Song", and "M" by Princess Princess, before settling on "Yoake no Michi" from Dog of Flanders.

=== Soundtrack ===
While choosing a composer to produce the series' music, director Watanabe wanted to choose someone who had "hit a nerve" with him. A fan of drama series, Watanabe was struck by a piece of music in the medical drama Death's Organ, and found that the series' composer, Kenichiro Suehiro, had also worked on a number of his favorite anime and drama series. After Suehiro was attached to the production, Watanabe gave him three major guidelines: use human voices during the Return by Death sequences; compose the music like he would for a drama or a movie to capture the emotional scenes; and "pull all the stops" for the suspenseful scenes. Additionally, for the first cours, Watanabe asked for music with a "suspenseful" vibe, while requesting music with a "romantic" feel for the second cours. Both Watanabe and Suehiro are fans of Italian composer Ennio Morricone, and Suehiro tried to take inspiration from his works while composing the soundtrack. Watanabe also requested that there be songs that mimicked Hans Zimmer's score from The Dark Knight. While Suehiro used music that was not very "anime-ish" during most of the series, he was asked to use more traditional anime music during the slice of life scenes. A number of times during the series, such as in episodes 7 and 15, Watanabe made it a point to use an entire song, something which is unusual in most anime.

The series makes limited use of its opening and ending themes, and Watanabe has said that he wished he could use them more frequently.

== Release ==
=== Season 1 ===
The 25-episode first season premiered on 4 April 2016, (Note: TV Tokyo listed the series premiere as airing on April 3 at 25:35, which is effectively April 4 at 1:35 a.m. JST.) with an extended 52-minute first episode. It was broadcast on TV Tokyo, TV Osaka, TV Aichi, and AT-X. The series was simulcast by Crunchyroll. Episode 14 and 18 ran 2 minutes longer than a typical anime episode, clocking at 25 minutes and 45 seconds. The final episode ran 3 minutes longer, clocking at 27 minutes and 15 seconds.

A series of anime shorts featuring chibi versions of the characters, titled Re:Zero − Starting Break Time From Zero (Re:ゼロから始める休憩時間(ブレイクタイム), Re:Zero kara Hajimeru Bureiku Taimu), were produced by Studio Puyukai to accompany the series. The shorts ran for eleven episodes before being replaced by a new series of shorts, titled Re:Petit − Starting Life in Another World from Petit (Re:プチから始める異世界生活, Re:Puchi kara Hajimeru Isekai Seikatsu), which began airing on 24 June 2016, and ran for 14 episodes. (Note: The shorts aired every Friday after each episode on AT-X, then streamed online four days later.) The shorts are directed, written, and produced by Minoru Ashina, with character designs by Minoru Takehara, who also animated the series alongside Sumi Kimoto and Chisato Totsuka. Kenichiro Suehiro reprised his role as composer for the shorts, while Tomoji Furuya of Suwara Pro produced the sound effects. Jin Aketagawa directed the sound at production company Magic Capsule.

The shorts aired on AT-X after each episode of the regular series, starting on 8 April 2016. Crunchyroll acquired the streaming rights to both series of shorts. Animax Asia later aired the series starting on 13 January 2017.

=== Season 2 ===
In March 2019, it was announced that a second season was in production. The cast and staff would reprise their roles for the second season. It was scheduled to premiere in April 2020, but was delayed to July 2020 due to production complications caused by the COVID-19 pandemic. Before the arrival of the second season's initial premiere date, an edited version of the first season premiered on 1 January 2020, on AT-X and other channels, with the edited version recapping the first season through one-hour episodes. It also included new additional footage. The OVA "Memory Snow" was also broadcast in between the episodes 5 and 6 of the edited version.

The second season was announced to be in a split-cours format, with the first half airing from 8 July to 30 September 2020, and the second half airing from 6 January to 24 March 2021. The English dub for the second season began streaming from 26 August onwards.

=== Season 3 ===
A third season of the anime series was announced at AnimeJapan 2023. The season is animated by White Fox and directed by Masahiro Shinohara, with Haruka Sagawa serving as character designer. It premiered in October 2024 with a 90-minute special, titled "Gekijō-gata Akui" (劇場型あくい; lit. 'Theatrical Malice'). The first cours, entitled the "Attack Arc", (Note: Shūgeki-hen (襲撃編)) ran from 2 October to 20 November 2024. The second cours, entitled the "Counterattack Arc", (Note: Hangeki-hen (反撃編)) ran from 5 February to 26 March 2025.

=== Season 4 ===
Immediately following the conclusion of the third season, a fourth was announced. Like the third, the fourth season ran in two batch cours. The first cours, entitled the "Loss Arc", (Note: Sōshitsu-hen (喪失編)) ran from 8 April to 17 June 2026. The second cours, entitled the "Recapture Arc", (Note: Dakkan-hen (奪還編)) ran from 12 August to 30 September of the same year. The first episode of the season was screened at the 2025 Lucca Comics & Games convention on 1 November 2025.

=== Season 5 ===
During the show's 10th anniversary event in November 2026, a fifth season was announced.

=== OVAs ===
An original video animation (OVA) episode was announced at the "MF Bunko J Summer School Festival 2017" event on 10 September 2017. All of the main staff and cast returned for the OVA, with Tatsuya Koyanagi joining as chief director. Titled Memory Snow, the OVA was screened in Japanese theaters starting on 6 October 2018. A second OVA, titled The Frozen Bond (氷結の絆, Hyōketsu no Kizuna), was announced on 23 September 2018. The OVA is an adaptation of the prequel novel Re:Zero Kara Hajimeru Zenjitsu-tan: Hyōketsu no Kizuna (Re:ゼロから始める前日譚 氷結の絆) which was included with the first Japanese Blu-ray release of the television series, and focused on the meeting of Emilia and Puck. It was released in Japanese theaters on 8 November 2019.

== Music ==
The first opening theme song is "Redo", performed by Konomi Suzuki, and the first ending theme is "Styx Helix", performed by Myth & Roid, while for episode 7 the ending theme is "Straight Bet", also performed by Myth & Roid. The second opening theme song, titled "Paradisus-Paradoxum", is performed by Myth & Roid, while the second ending theme, "Stay Alive", is performed by Rie Takahashi. Myth & Roid also performed the ending theme for episode 14 titled "theater D".

The second season's first opening theme song is "Realize", performed by Konomi Suzuki, while the first ending theme song is "Memento", performed by Nonoc. The second season's second opening theme song is "Long Shot", performed by Mayu Maeshima, while the second ending theme song is "Believe in You", performed by Nonoc.

The third season's opening theme song is "Reweave", performed by Konomi Suzuki, while the ending theme song is "Nox Lux", performed by Myth & Roid.

The fourth season's opening theme song is "Recollect", performed by Konomi Suzuki and Ashnikko, while the ending theme song is "Ender Ember", performed by Myth & Roid and TK from Ling Tosite Sigure.

The series' soundtrack was released on CD on 26 October 2016. The disk contains 21 tracks composed by Kenichiro Suehiro.

Re: Life in a different world from zero Original Sound Track
No.	Title	Length
1.	"Rondo of Love and Darkness – Main Theme –" (愛と漆黒の輪舞曲 – MainTheme - Ai to Shikkoku no Rondo – Main Theme -)	3:49
2.	"Takt of Heroes – Origin –" (英雄のタクト – 起源 - Eiyū no Takuto – Kigen -)	2:53
3.	"Hymne of Despair and Atonement" (絶望と贖罪のヒュムネ Zetsubō to Shokuzai no Hyumune)	3:11
4.	"Dragon Kingdom Lugunica" (親竜王国ルグニカ Shinryū Ōkoku Rugunika)	2:43
5.	"Otherworld March" (異世界行進曲 Isekai Kōshinkyoku)	1:59
6.	"Memories of Time and Sky" (時と空の想い出 Toki to Sora no Omoide)	1:39
7.	"Promenade of Whistles and Creation" (笛と創造の散歩道 Fue to Sōzō no Sanpomichi)	2:06
8.	"Re:verse"	2:32
9.	"Heartbeat of Determination" (決意の心音 Ketsui no Kokone)	2:05
10.	"Fantasy Lied" (幻想リート Gensō Rīto)	3:41
11.	"Echt of Sorrow" (哀しみのエヒト Kanashimi no Ehito)	3:51
12.	"Chain of Memories" (記憶の鎖 Kioku no Kusari)	3:31
13.	"Roar of Malice" (悪意の咆哮 Akui no Hōkō)	2:56
14.	"Sloth" (怠惰 Taida)	2:05
15.	"Call of the Witch" (魔女の呼び声 Majo no Yobigoe)	2:46
16.	"Activation of Fate" (運命の起動 Unmei no Kidō)	2:23
17.	"Requiem of Silence" (沈黙のレクイエム Chinmoku no Rekuiemu)	7:03
18.	"Death Ballet"	2:47
19.	"Waltz of Rage" (激昂の円舞 Gekikō no Enbu)	2:12
20.	"Overture of the Final Battle" (決戦の序曲 Kessen no Jokyoku)	3:01
21.	"Wish of the Stars" (星の願い Hoshi no Negai)	3:32
Total length:		52:45

"Redo", Suzuki's 10th single, was released on CD on 11 May 2016. The single was also released as a limited edition with a DVD featuring a music video, a live concert video, and a "making of" video. The songs were performed by Suzuki, with lyrics by Genki Mizuno and arrangement by Makoto Miyazaki.

Redo
No.	Title	Length
1.	"Redo"	4:18
2.	"Mebius" (メビウス)	4:16
3.	"The Continuation of Dreams" (メビウス Yume no Tsuzuki)	5:46
4.	"Redo" (Instrumental)	4:18
5.	"Mebius" (メビウス Instrumental)	4:16
Total length:		22:54

The CD for "Styx Helix", the series' first ending theme, was Myth & Roid's 3rd single. Written, arranged, and performed by the group, it was released on 25 May 2016 and included both regular and instrumental versions of "Styx Helix" and "Straight Bet".

"Stay Alive", the second ending theme, was released as a single on 24 August 2016. The songs were performed by Takahashi (Emilia) and Minase (Rem). The songs were written and arranged by Heart's Cry.

Stay Alive
No.	Title	Performer	Length
1.	"Stay Alive"	Rie Takahashi	4:26
2.	"Wishing"	Inori Minase	6:00
3.	"Dream of a Boy" (ぼうやの夢よ Bōya no Yumeyo)	Rie Takahashi	3:30
4.	"Stay Alive" (Instrumental)		4:26
5.	"Wishing" (Instrumental)		6:00
6.	"Dream of a Boy" (ぼうやの夢よ Bōya no Yumeyo (Instrumental))		3:30
Total length:			27:52

Myth & Roid released the second opening theme as a single on 24 August 2016. The CD included regular and instrumental versions of "Paradisus-Paradoxum" and "Theater D".

For Memory Snow, three pieces of theme music were used: the ending theme "Memory Memory Snow" and the image song "Relive" by Nonoc, and the insert song "Memories" by Riko Azuna.

Memory Snow Original Sound Track
No.	Title	Performer	Length
1.	"Takt of Heroes – Origin –" (英雄のタクト -起源)		2:55
2.	"Fantasy Clap" (空想クラップ)		1:41
3.	"Timbre of the Beginning" (始まりの音色)		2:06
4.	"Fur Craftsman" (毛並み職人)		1:58
5.	"Fool" (おたんこナス)		1:35
6.	"Waking Up with Rem" (寝起きとレム)		1:47
7.	"Yoake no Michi" (よあけのみち)		0:23
8.	"Relive" (イメージソング)	nonoc	4:01
9.	"Appa" (リンガ)		1:33
10.	"Emilia's Secret" (エミリアの隠し事)		1:54
11.	"Roswaal" (ロズワール)		2:25
12.	"Departure" (発魔期)		2:37
13.	"Walker of Whistle and Creation" (笛と創造の散歩者)		2:07
14.	"Subaru Concerto" (スバル協奏曲)		1:53
15.	"March from Another World" (異世界行進曲)		1:59
16.	"Discussion" (相談中)		2:05
17.	"Eclipse of Macht" (侵食のマハト)		2:29
18.	"Start of Fate" (運命の起動)		2:24
19.	"Chikichiki" (チキチキ)		1:46
20.	"Memories"	Riko Azuna	4:15
21.	"Memories of Time and Sky" (時と空の思い出)		1:42
22.	"Snow Festival" (雪まつり)		1:55
23.	"EMT!!"		1:42
24.	"Lively Days" (賑やかな日々)		1:55
25.	"Train of Thought" (思考回路)		2:50
26.	"Festive Night" (宴の夜)		2:47
27.	"Fascinating Alcohol" (魅惑の酒)		2:53
28.	"Memory Snow"		4:49
29.	"White White Snow"	nonoc	3:53
Total length:			1:08:17

== Home media release ==
Funimation announced during their Katsucon 2018 panel that they would release the first season on home video with an English dub in North America as part of the two companies' partnership. Funimation released the first part of the first season on Blu-ray and DVD in North America on 19 June 2018, and the second part on 5 February 2019. Funimation later released all of season 1 on one Blu-ray on 9 June 2020. In the United Kingdom, the series is distributed by Anime Limited, who released the first part of the first season on DVD on 25 June 2018 and the second part on 20 May 2019. Anime Limited later released both parts on Blu-ray on 19 August 2019, with a complete collection being released on 15 February 2021. Both Funimation and Anime Limited's Season 1 Part 1 Blu-ray releases received negative attention after it was discovered that they showed visible color banding and compression artifacts. Madman Anime released the first part of the first season in Australia on Blu-ray on 8 May 2019.

== Reception ==
The series was the 21st best selling anime on home video during 2016, selling approximately 68,791 Blu-ray and DVD sets. The OVA, "Memory Snow", released in 2018, sold a total of 10,429 Blu-ray and DVD copies.

The first season ranked first in a poll of 820 people conducted by the Japanese website Anime! Anime!, to determine the best anime series of spring 2016. Andy Hanley from UK Anime Network considered the anime adaptation as one of 2016's best series.

The Managing Editor from Anime Now!, Richard Eisenbeis lists the anime as one of his top picks from 2016 for its "culturally complex" world and characters that have "their own plans, faults, and motivations". He praised Subaru as the "most complex character of the year" due to provoking the audience to "cheer him and despise him" in a world that portrayed him as the "least special person in it". The series' fourth season broke record in IMDb's site, making it the first isekai anime to achieve such a great appeal in Western regions, competing with mainstream series like Jujutsu Kaisen, Chainsaw Man and Demon Slayer: Kimetsu no Yaiba.

In a survey of (primarily female) Otamart users, the series was ranked second on a list of the most successful media titles of 2016 and was also the Crunchyroll most-watched series of 2016, topping Yuri on Ice..

=== Accolades ===
Award	Year	Category	Recipient(s)	Result	Ref.
6th Newtype Anime Awards	2016	Anime of the Year	Re:Zero − Starting Life in Another World	2nd place	
6th Newtype Anime Awards	2016	Best Director	Masaharu Watanabe	Won	
6th Newtype Anime Awards	2016	Best Male Character	Subaru Natsuki	Won	
6th Newtype Anime Awards	2016	Best Female Character	Rem	Won	
6th Newtype Anime Awards	2016	Best Mascot Character	Puck	Won	
6th Newtype Anime Awards	2016	Best Screenplay	Masahiro Yokotani	2nd place	
6th Newtype Anime Awards	2016	Best Character Design	Shin'ichirō Ōtsuka and Kyuta Sakai	3rd place	
6th Newtype Anime Awards	2016	Best Soundtrack	Re:Zero − Starting Life in Another World	4th place	
6th Newtype Anime Awards	2016	Best Opening Theme	"Redo"	4th place	
Sugoi Japan Award	2017	Best Light Novel	Re:Zero − Starting Life in Another World season 1	Won	
Sugoi Japan Award	2017	Best Anime	Re:Zero − Starting Life in Another World season 1	Won	
1st Crunchyroll Anime Awards	2017	Anime of the Year	Re:Zero − Starting Life in Another World season 1	Nominated	
1st Crunchyroll Anime Awards	2017	Best Girl	Rem	Won	
5th Crunchyroll Anime Awards	2021	Best Antagonist	Echidna	Nominated	
5th Crunchyroll Anime Awards	2021	Best VA Performance (Japanese)	Yūsuke Kobayashi as Subaru Natsuki	Won	
5th Crunchyroll Anime Awards	2021	Best VA Performance (English)	Anairis Quiñones as Echidna	Nominated	
5th Crunchyroll Anime Awards	2021	Best Fantasy	Re:Zero − Starting Life in Another World season 2	Won	
9th Crunchyroll Anime Awards	2025	Best Isekai Anime	Re:Zero − Starting Life in Another World season 3	Won	
10th Crunchyroll Anime Awards	2026	Best Isekai Anime	Re:Zero − Starting Life in Another World season 3 (cours 2)	Won	
16th Newtype Anime Awards	2026	Best Work (TV/Streaming)	Re:Zero − Starting Life in Another World season 4	4th place	
