= Lost Song (TV series) =

Japanese anime television series

- Genre: Fantasy, musical
- Created by: Morita to Jumpei (Note: The penname of Junpei Morita.)
- Anime television series
- Directed by: Morita to Jumpei
- Produced by: Shinji Ōmori; Fuyuna Iizuka; Yoshiyuki Shioya; Kō Otani; Akio Iijima (Note: Unconfirmed romanization of 飯島章夫.); Doris Ng
- Written by: Morita to Jumpei
- Music by: Yūsuke Shirato
- Studio: Liden Films; Dwango
- Licensed by: Netflix
- Original network: Tokyo MX, SUN, TVA, BS Fuji, KBS
- Original run: March 31, 2018 – June 16, 2018
- Episodes: 12

Lost Song (stylized in all caps) is a musical fantasy anime television series produced by Liden Films in collaboration with Dwango and Mages. The series follows Rin and Finis, two girls with opposite backgrounds and personalities yet sharing the commonality of performing miraculous songs worthy of healing, wind, water and fire. Rin and Finis each embark on an arduous journey during a time of war in the kingdom, and they must find each other in order to sing a duet that will restore world peace once again. The project stars musician Konomi Suzuki as Rin and voice actress Yukari Tamura as Finis. The series aired from March to June 2018.

== Plot ==
Rin is an energetic girl who lives in a grassy frontier village. Finis spends her days in solitude deep within the royal palace in the bustling capital city. While the girls appear to be opposites, they share a special power that no other person has—the power of song, which can heal wounds, create and control the elements water, fire, earth, and air. Guided by destiny, the two young women each face an arduous journey as the shadow of war looms over the kingdom, tainting their miraculous songs with the blood of innocents. Loved ones meet their deaths as silent screams echo through a stone prison, and Rin and Finis hope that their last song will be one of hope.

== Characters ==
Rin (リン, Rin)
Voiced by: Konomi Suzuki (Japanese); Cherami Leigh (English)
Rin is an energetic young brown-haired girl harboring a passion for singing living with her adopted younger brother Al, adopted older sister Mel and grandfather Talgia Hawklay in a reclusive village near a forest. She discovers her ability to sing Spirit Songs, legendary songs that can manipulate the four elements of the world and bring about miracles. Unlike Finis, her songs energize her instead of taking away her lifespan. After Mel and Talgia died, she promised to live her dream of singing with the Court Orchestra in the Capital and save as many lives as she can with her powers. Rin was originally a part of Finis, the last bit of Finis's hope of her feelings for Henry and Song of Healing, who came to existence after Finis purged it from herself to sing the destructive and deathly Song of Mortality. Singing the Song of Healing for Finis to grant her wish to restore the world to its former state ultimately would lead to Rin's "death" but she follows through regardless. After the duet of the Lost Song is completed, Rin vanishes and emerges with Finis as the verse states that hope (Rin herself) would disappear after the ultimate wish was fulfilled. A memorial is created using the original Henry Leobolt's sword as a marker. However, with the revelation of Finis's pregnancy, implies that Rin may indeed be reborn as her daughter in her next life. That explains why when Rin disappeared Finis heard the beating of a heart that was not his own.
Finis (フィーニス, Fīnisu)
Voiced by: Yukari Tamura (Japanese); Melissa Fahn (English)
Finis is a beautiful, clumsy, naïve and innocent young woman with the uniquely powerful ability to sing Spirit Songs, although they eat away at her lifespan each time she does. Because of her ability, she was captured and married to the Prince to work as a human weapon for war. Believing she was helping people and later for her lover Henry, she followed his orders until he tricked her into killing Henry, driving her to snap and unleash a forbidden song's incredible deathly and destructive powers onto the world out of sheer sorrow and rage. Unfortunately, the Song of Mortality was designed to gift her immortality in exchange for the gradual annihilation and continuous reset of the world. After singing the Lost Song, her hope (Rin) returned to her. The last scene seen of her is when Corte finds her, heavily pregnant; indicating that Rin may be reborn as her firstborn child.
Al (アル, Aru)
Voiced by: Misaki Kuno (Japanese); Erika Harlacher (English)
Al is Rin and Mel's younger brother. He is introduced as a boy who wants to go to the Capital to show off his prototype inventions. His weapon of choice is his Star Bombs, firecracker bombs which act as a smokescreen. He later becomes an apprentice under Dr. Weissen and separates from Rin and the others. However, he returns in his jet pet fueled with Dr. Weissen's echo devices to save Rin from being attacked by Bazra. Al also combines efforts with Henry to defeat Bazra after he was equipped with the new model of the Symphony Killer.
Pony Goodlight (ポニー・グッドライト, Ponī Guddoraito)
Voiced by: Chiaki Takahashi (Japanese); Reba Buhr (English)
Pony is a kind court minstrel that used to work at the palace and Rin and Al's first companion on their journey to the Capital. She was the eye of the alternate Henry after see her perform; according to Henry, she was originally thought to be lost during war. She has a great talent for music and is often seen carrying a portable piano around to play songs on. After she quit her job, she got most of her money from winning bets. She also has a great fear of bugs and can appreciates flattery. She is revealed to be none other than Princess Alea Golt who had mysterious disappeared. She later becomes Queen of Golt, with Henry as general.
Monica Lux (モニカ・ルックス, Monika Rukkusu)
Voiced by: Asami Seto (Japanese); Cassandra Morris (English)
Monica is Allu's younger sister and a rhythmist. It is characteristic of her to wear a pink zipper bunny suit, and fall asleep when she is afraid. Along with Allu, she gave up her dream of entering the Court Orchestra to work as rhythmists to heal their mother's blindness. Apart from drumming and keeping time, she is also a good singer, and can imitate any music perfectly after hearing it just once, so she can greatly amplify the strength and effects of Rin's song from time to time.
Allu Lux (アル, Aru Rukkusu)
Voiced by: Misaki Kuno (Japanese); Kira Buckland (English)
Allu is Monica's oldest sister and a rhythmist. She is the bravest of the sisters and is very protective of her younger sister, although sometimes her harsh attitude can come off as rude. Along with Monica, she gave up her dream of entering the Court Orchestra to work as rhythmists to heal their mother's blindness.
Henry Leobolt (ヘンリー・レオボルト, Henrī Reoboruto)
Voiced by: Seiichirō Yamashita (Japanese); Kyle McCarley (English)
Henry is a handsome, brave and caring knight well known for his noble family heritage and expert swordsmanship. Because he was the only one that looked at Finis as a human instead of a weapon, she fell in love with him and so did he. He is accidentally and unknowingly killed by Finis, who did not know it was him; after Prince Rudo fooled her into executing a traitor. He reincarnated several time during different eras; such as being witness to Finis's being burned at the stake to a bespectacled scientist who is married with a young daughter; meeting Finis in some form; and in some cases, witnessing her destructive and deathly Song of Mortality firsthand, as it was his demise that had caused her to snap and sing the forbidden song of mortality that contained such destructive power.
Corte (コルテ, Korute)
Voiced by: Ai Kayano (Japanese); Kira Buckland (English)
Corte is Finis's personal maid who is one other person who cared for her as a human. While trying to feed the Prince Rudo poison to let her lady and Henry escape together. However, she is found out and the plan backfiring; she is then and forced to drink the poison. Her final moments was the sight of Finis and Henry. After the world is saved from yet another reset, she became the pregnant Finis's protector once again.
Mel (メル, Meru)
Voiced by: Ai Kayano (Japanese); Kira Buckland (English)
Mel is Al and Rin's older sister who also acts as a motherly figure to them. She is found by Rin and Al mortally wounded. Rin tries to use her Song of Healing to save her, but comes too late. She wished for Rin to sing at the Capital before ultimately dying from her wounds.
Bazra Bearmors (バズラ・ベアモルス, Bazura Beamorusu)
Voiced by: Tsuyoshi Koyama (Japanese); Keith Silverstein (English)
Bazra is the ruthless general of the army and Talgia's successor. Unlike his predecessor, he is a ruthless, violent and wicked man that withholds information from the royal family for his personal gain. He started as a regular mercenary, but then stumbled upon Finis and witnessing her power firsthand; used her powers as a tool of war and rising in the ranks of the Capital Army as General; much to Talgia, Dr. Weissen, and Henry's disdain. Talgia dueled him, but cheated using one of Dr. Weissen's inventions causing him to burn Talgia's right hand. After he and his men witness Rin use song to heal Henry, he decides to attack Rin's village; once again crossing paths with Talgia; which resulted in the incineration of the village, and the demise of Mel and Taiga. Bazra attempted to use the Symphony Killer weapon to destroy the elderly King of Golt, but is ultimately killed by the combined efforts of Henry and Al.
Prince Rudo Bernstein IV (ルード・ベルンシュタイン4世, Rūdo Berunshutain 4-sei)
Voiced by: Yuto Suzuki (Japanese); Todd Haberkorn (English)
Rudo is the cunning, manipulative and coldhearted prince of the country. He desires to use Finis as a human weapon to win the war. After he used her to "cremate" Henry Leobolt, he was incinerated by the saddened and enraged Finis' Song of Mortality's destructive powers.
During Rin's present, now known as Prince Rudo Golt, he looks a bit more younger and has blond hair. He is also Princess Alea Golt's younger brother. Unlike the original, he was opposed to using Finis as a human weapon. He was oppose to General Bazra's methods as not only it was reckless, but put the kingdom's economy in jeopardy. After, General Bazra's attack, he fell into the waterfall, but was saved by Henry's loyal men, Berrow and Snore; also, telling him that the King of Golt has died causing him to curse Bazra. He is present at his elder sister's, Princess Alea, side during her coronation.
Doctor Weissen (ドクター・ヴァイゼン, Dokutā Vaizen)
Voiced by: Mitsuru Ogata
Dr. Weissen is a famous scientist, physicist and inventor that used to conduct research for the army in bringing about peace for the country. With the beginning of the war, Bazra and the army started to use his inventions for killing purposes by enhancing the destructive nature of Finis's songs; to which Dr. Weissen disapproved of. As such, they submerged his entire lab, drowned his lab assistants, and stole his inventions, in addition to making him lose hope. Upon meeting Rin and her companions, she saved his lab and he lets Al stay with him as his assistant. He was the best friend of Talgia and was surprised to learn that Rin was his granddaughter. He is also the first to learn from Rin about the unfortunate consequences of singing the Song of Healing during the Starsong Festival.
Talgia Hawkray (タルジア・ホークレイ, Tarujia Hōkurei)
Voiced by: Hiroshi Ito (Japanese); Michael Sorich (English)
Talgia is Al, Rin and Mel's grandfather who strongly disapproves of Rin singing, revealing that he knew about her power ever since she was young as he knew the Capital would attempt to use Rin as a human weapon just like Finis. Before he moved to the village, he was a strong commander and general in the army until he started to realize its brutal methods of violence and bloodshed. He dueled with Bazra in attempts from stopping him from using the Song of Mortality; but lost due to Bazra using one of Weissen's echo devices, which burned his right arm and rendered it immobile. However, a young Rin used her Song of Healing to heal it entirely; thus he had vowed to protect Rin from the Capital. He was also a good friend of Dr. Weissen.
Berrow
Voiced by: Isamu Yusen (Japanese); Julien Chatelet (English)
Berrow is burly bearded man who wields a giant axe. His first incarnation was a cynical mercenary who fought the front lines and mocked Henry for being a spoiled rich kid and tried to scare him saying the front line soldiers are discarded trash meant to die. However, over time and having witnessed Henry's resolve, he begins to respect him. He also comes to befriend Finis. After the end of the war, he swears loyalty to Henry. It is unclear of his first demise either by execution for swearing loyalty to Henry or a portion of the deathly Song of Mortality.
His current self is no different from his past self, but seems to be more cheerful with blonde. He serves as a member of Henry's rebellion against the Capital.
Snore
Voiced by: Katsuhiro Tokuishi (Japanese); Arnaud Laurent (English)
Snore is skinny man who wields a saber. Like Berrow, was a mercenary who served the front lines. He also comes to befriend Finis. After the end of the war, he swears loyalty to Henry. It is unclear of his first demise, either by execution for swearing loyalty to Henry or the Song of Mortality.
His alternate is more or less the same. He serves as a member of Henry's rebellion against the Capital.

== Production and release ==
The series was revealed in an announcement during a birthday concert held by Suzuki in November 2016. The series was first released online in Japan through Netflix on March 31, 2018, followed by a TV airing on Tokyo MX, SUN, TVA, BS Fuji and KBS on April 7, 2018. Netflix began streaming the series globally on September 30, 2018.

The opening theme is "Utaeba Soko ni Kimi ga Iru Kara" (歌えばそこに君がいるから; lit. 'If I Sing, You Will Be There') by Konomi Suzuki, and the ending theme is "Tears Echo" by Yukari Tamura. Both songs were released on May 23, 2018.

A new project was announced on September 24, 2018.

== Episodes ==
| No. | Title | Original release date |
|---|---|---|
| 1 | "The Song of Healing"; Transliteration: "Iyashi no Uta" (Japanese: 癒やしの歌) | March 31, 2018 |
A young girl named Rin lives with her younger brother Al, older sister Mel and grandfather Talgia Hawkray in the faraway Dandera Village deep within a forest. Rin is devoted to go to the Capital and sing in the Court Orchestra, while Al is determined to show off his prototype inventions. However, Talgia refuses and even forbids Rin from singing. Rin and Al are given the opportunity to sneak out by venturing into the forest and picking berries, whereupon they stumble upon an injured knight from the Capital, later recognized as Henry Leobolt. Although Al wants to return to get medicine, Rin decides to treat Henry with the Song of Healing. After Henry formally introduces himself and tries to honor their wish of going to the Capital, ice mysteriously begins to spread throughout the forest, separating Rin and Al from Henry. As Rin and Al are trapped in the forest, they overhear a knight witnessing Rin's Song of Healing and reporting back to general Bazra Bearmors, who went to kill Talgia and burn down the village. Rin and Al hurry back to the village, desperately trying to save Mel from under the debris, but Mel ends up dying in Rin's arms.
| 2 | "The Song of Departure"; Transliteration: "Tabidachi no Uta" (Japanese: 旅立ちの歌) | April 7, 2018 |
Henry returns to the Capital, only to be told that a war is upon the country in its competition for the power of their songstress, later recognized as Finis, whose songs can rejuvenate and heal soldiers. Henry refuses to see Finis as a tool to be used in war. Finis, a beautiful but clumsy woman, is forbidden to leave the palace tower, according to her maid Corte. The ruthless prince Rudo Bernstein IV intends to marry Finis and keep her bound to the castle. While Finis enjoys fresh air in the garden on a rare occasion with her attendants, she gets lost and almost killed by an assassin. Henry arrives to save her and earns the title of being her bodyguard. Meanwhile, Rin and Al reach a small town after a day of trekking, where they manage to get food in an inn. They meet Pony Goodlight, a former court minstrel from the Capital trying to pay her lodging fee by performing. Rin joins Pony in song, and Pony's lodging fee is free of charge. Pony eventually realizes that Rin is a songstress, warning her that she will be hunted down for her powers by the Capital Army.
| 3 | "The Song of Love"; Transliteration: "Aibo no Uta" (Japanese: 愛慕の歌) | April 14, 2018 |
The innkeepers sell out Rin, Al and Pony to some knights of the Capital Army. Pony attempts to stall them, but she is knocked out. Al then throws a Star Bomb, a type of firecracker bomb invention that can act as a smoke screen. However, Al gets stabbed by a dagger in the process, and Rin uses the Song of Healing to treat him. The knights promptly capture Rin, Al and Pony on boats. Al uses a knife to saw through his ropes before untying Rin and Pony. Also, Pony teaches Rin the Song of Wind. With Al's Star Bombs and then Rin's Song of Wind, the knights are successfully defeated. At the palace, Henry and Finis grow close after he protects her from more assassins, although Corte goes missing in the process. Later on, Finis and Henry camp out together in the woods, and Finis sings the Song of Fire to return his kindness and chivalry, despite shortening her lifespan by doing so. The next morning, Corte finds Finis and escorts her back to the palace tower, while an envious Rudo discharges Henry from his bodyguard duties and send him on the fiercest front lines of war.
| 4 | "The Song of Depravity"; Transliteration: "Ochi Yuku Uta" (Japanese: 堕ち行く歌) | April 21, 2018 |
Henry fights in the front lines alongside comrades Berrow and Snore. Finis later arrives on the front lines and put her life in danger to use her Song of Healing in order to revive the soldiers. Henry then hears word that Finis plans to use the destructive Weapon of Song against the enemy. In the countryside, Rin, Al and Pony find a wagon transporting military weapons along with a pair of female rhythm masters, who raise morale of the troops and increase their productivity. When the wagon hits a bump in the road, the rhythm masters are thrown out and introduce themselves as Monica Lux and Allu Lux before each group parts ways. Rin, Al and Pony soon lodge at an inn to eat and stay the night. Monica and Allu later enter the inn and reveal themselves to be daughters of the blind innkeeper. While Al searches for Monica, who has run off, Allu tells Rin and Pony that they are rhythm masters to earn money for their mother's eye treatment, instead of chasing their dream of playing in the Court Orchestra. Rin, Pony, Monica and Allu make music together, inevitably healing the innkeeper's blindness.
| 5 | "The Song of Encounter"; Transliteration: "Kaigō no uta" (Japanese: 邂逅の歌) | April 28, 2018 |
Corte realizes that a frail Finis is using her powers for war to protect Henry. Being told that Rudo would execute Henry if Finis did not use her powers against the enemy, Corte runs into the forest to gather herbs. When a knight tells Corte that Finis has gone to the watering hole, Corte instinctively runs back into the forest. Finis meets Berrow and Snore while wandering in the forest. Meanwhile, Rin, Al, Pony, Monica and Allu eventually encounter Henry at the western checkpoint of the Capital, as Rin uses the Song of Wind to rescue him from being shot with arrows. While imprisoned, Henry reveals that the purpose of the minstrel hunt was to capture Rin for her power of songs. After Henry reveals that another songstress has been manipulated into a weapon, later recognizing her as Finis, he unlocks the cell doors to help the others escape from the western checkpoint. Henry holds back the knights, while telling the others to seek refuge at a laboratory due west. Rin uses the Song of Wind to fly the horse-drawn carriage over the western checkpoint gate.
| 6 | "The Song of Goodbye"; Transliteration: "Wakare no Uta" (Japanese: 別れの歌) | May 5, 2018 |
Henry reunites with Finis, Berrow and Snore in the forest. Although Corte is relieved to find them, Rudo arrives to take Finis to the Montvale Fortress, but Henry proposes that it can be captured without the use of Finis. Henry, Berrow and Snore ultimately conquers the Montvale Fortress. Meanwhile, Rin, Al, Pony, Monica and Allu find a cottage owned by Doctor Weissen, who has all sorts of contraptions. Al finds a wooden box with a five-dial combination lock, as he deduces that the password is "Finis", despite Weissen claiming not to know her. The box contains the same military weapons on the wagon from before, which Weissen reveals that they are echo devices designed to amplify and preserve the power of the songstress in order to relax the burden. However, since he refused to cooperate with the Capital Army, his research was confiscated and his laboratory was sunken, leading him to give up on everything. Rin tells Weissen that she also suffered losses, giving her the reason to continue singing. Rin, Pony, Monica and Allu make music together, restoring Weissen's laboratory from the lake. Weissen offers Al to stay as his assistant while the others continue on their journey.
| 7 | "The Song of Mortality"; Transliteration: "Tsui Metsu no Uta" (Japanese: 終滅の歌) | May 12, 2018 |
While the front line knights celebrate with a banquet in honor of their victory at their army camp, Corte sternly warns Finis and Henry to run away. Corte personally serves Rudo her wine, but Rudo sees through this act of kindness as a way of poisoning him, by which he forces her to drink the wine and kills her for good. Rin, Pony, Monica and Allu have made it to Ash City, where a mural depicts a goddess who destroys the world. However, they are concerned of a meteor that seems to be expanding towards them. They then approach the army camp amidst the heavy fog. Rudo takes Henry to see the prisoners at night for unknown reasons. In the morning, Finis bumps into Rudo, who brings her to burn the prisoners outside using the Song of Fire, but she is distraught when she unknowingly burns her beloved Henry at the stake instead, set by Rudo himself. Disheartened and enraged, Finis summons the last of her strength to unleash a portion of the forbidden Song of Mortality's destructive powers onto the Earth, killing Rudo and his men just as Rin, Pony, Monica and Allu arrive in the present.
| 8 | "The Song of Eternity"; Transliteration: "Yūkyū no Uta" (Japanese: 悠久の歌) | May 19, 2018 |
In an alternate timeline, astronomer Henry predicts that the Moon has changed its orbit and will collide into Earth in about 60,000 years. When Henry and Finis meet, she tells him that she is an ancient songstress who was blessed with the great magical power to make miracles with her singing alone until she had used that very power to kill her dearly beloved. According to her, life is an endless yet hopeless cycle between past and future. Finis appears to be immortal and ageless after singing the Song of Mortality several times, no matter what era she finds herself to be in. She endured many sufferings from constantly resetting the world in hopes of reuniting with the man whom she once loved. Finis reveals to Henry that she was responsible for the change in the orbit of the Moon long ago. To end everything, she plans to sing the Song of Mortality one more time at the annual Starsong Festival, where people sing to the stars to grant their wishes. This is when the Moon will be at its closest to Earth. In the alternate present, Bazra is responsible for abusing Finis's strong mystical power of songs for his personal gain.
| 9 | "The Song of Nostalgia"; Transliteration: "Kyōshū no Uta" (Japanese: 郷愁の歌) | May 26, 2018 |
Finis, now in cloaked attire, is told by Bazra that her power of songs will achieve world domination, but she states that their prior agreement was for her to sing her Song of Mortality during the Starsong Festival. Rin, Pony, Monica and Allu realize that Finis has only been seen by a few knights of the Capital Army. A daring plan is concocted to pretend in bringing Finis to the knights while using a wind echo device, hijacking Weissen's stolen machine called the Symphony Killer and ensuing chaos to save the real Finis. The plan backfires when Monica, who was pretending to be Finis, is the only one allowed onboard the Symphony Killer. Monica subsequently falls asleep out of fear, accidentally activating the Symphony Killer at random. Pony, Monica and Allu are then rescued by Berrow and Snore. Meanwhile, Rin touches Henry's original sword containing black spirits, transporting herself into Finis's past. Rin discovers how Finis eventually abandoned her feelings for Henry after burning him at the stake. Finis discarded the Song of Healing, which represents hope, and it manifested itself as Rin, who was found by Talgia serving in the Capital Army at that time.
| 10 | "The Song of Determination"; Transliteration: "Kakugo no Uta" (Japanese: 覚悟の歌) | June 2, 2018 |
Rin was taken in by Talgia and Mel as a baby. Talgia was against Bazra's views of using Finis's power of songs as a tool of war. While dueling, Bazra used a fire echo device to disable Talgia's right arm from wielding his sword. After Talgia later held Rin by his left arm, Rin sang the Song of Healing to treat his right arm, as he vowed to always protect her. In the present, Henry, revealed to be alive, sadly has no recollection of Finis. Pony, Monica, Allu, Berrow and Snore notice that the ash is moving despite the wind not blowing. Bazra confronts Henry, who finds himself near Rin. As Finis subconsciously tells Rin to help her, this purifies Henry's original sword. Pony, Monica, Allu, Berrow and Snore arrive, but Henry warns them that Bazra has a crossbow loaded with echo devices. When Bazra prepares to aim at Rin, she is saved by the timely arrival of Al, who launches Star Bombs while flying in a jet pack, causing Bazra to retreat. After Al advises Pony, Monica, Allu, Henry, Berrow and Snore to head to Weissen's laboratory, Rin vows to save Finis, no matter what.
| 11 | "The Song of Silence"; Transliteration: "Mukyō no Uta" (Japanese: 無響の歌) | June 9, 2018 |
Al reveals that his jet pack is powered by wind echo devices, but the weight of Rin causes both of them to fall. While Rin, Al, Pony, Monica, Allu, Henry, Berrow and Snore camp out, they spot an airship, which they assume that Bazra is heading to the Capital. As Rin, Al, Pony, Monica, Allu and Henry visit Weissen, they reveal that Finis and Bazra have a common interest in using her power of songs. Meanwhile, as Finis and Bazra are heading to the Capital, he mentions that the Symphony Killer was just a prototype, so as long as she holds her end of the agreement. Upon his return, Bazra is waiting for the new model of the Symphony Killer to be ready. Henry tells Al that he laid eyes on a masked princess in the Court Orchestra five years ago, but she disappeared soon after. The eventual plan is for Rin to sing the Song of Healing before Finis sings the Song of Mortality. Weissen gives everyone mechanical flying horses as their way of transportation to the Capital, while Rin previously revealed to Weissen that she will ultimately disappear as she is Finis's Song of Healing that was discarded many centuries ago.
| 12 | "The Song of Beginning"; Transliteration: "Hajimari no Uta" (Japanese: 始まりの歌) | June 16, 2018 |
Finis and the Court Orchestra perform the deathly Song of Mortality, forcing the Moon to start falling towards Earth. Henry, Berrow and Snore fight against Bazra, who is equipped with the new Symphony Killer. Henry and Al ultimately combine their efforts to kill Bazra. Upon finding Finis, Rin reveals herself as the Song of Healing that Finis chose to throw away long ago. Pony reveals herself as the long-lost Princess Alea Golt, convincing the Court Orchestra and Rin's Orchestra to perform with Rin and Finis in singing the Lost Song. Weissen tells Al that this is the union between Rin's Song of Healing and Finis's Song of Mortality, which means that saving Finis will end in Rin's death. After the performance, the Moon crumbles over Earth, thus saving everyone for the better. Henry is appointed the new general and crowned the king alongside Pony as the queen. Monica and Allu return to their hometown performing in their mother's inn. Weissen spends his time in seclusion in his laboratory making experiments. Al is the youngest scientist ever seen and even succeeds Weissen. Now guarded by a knighted Corte, Finis is presumably pregnant with a reborn Rin.
