= List of Re:Zero episodes =

Re:Zero − Starting Life in Another World is an anime television series based on the light novel series Re:Zero − Starting Life in Another World written by Tappei Nagatsuki and illustrated by Shinichirou Otsuka. The series follows Subaru Natsuki, a high school student transported to another world with the ability to automatically rewind time to a certain checkpoint upon his death. Masaharu Watanabe serves as series director for the first two seasons, while Masahiro Shinohara succeeded his role beginning with the third season. Masahiro Yokotani serves as the series composition writer, while Kyuta Sakai serves as both a character designer and chief animation director. The series is streamed by Crunchyroll.

Re:Zero premiered on April 3, 2016, with the first season airing across four networks: TV Tokyo, TV Osaka, TV Aichi, and AT-X. The first season concluded on September 19. After season one, two original video animations (OVAs) based on the series were released on October 6, 2018, and November 8, 2019, respectively. On March 23, 2019, it was announced that a second season was in production with the original cast and staff reprised returning for the second season. The season was originally set to release in April 2020, before being delayed due to the COVID-19 pandemic. It was aired in two parts, with the first half releasing from July 8 to September 30, 2020, and the second half airing on January 6, 2021. The third season was also released in two parts, with the first batch of eight episodes running from October 2 to November 20, 2024, and the second batch, also eight episodes, following from February 5 to March 26, 2025. Immediately following the conclusion of the third season, a fourth was announced to be in production. It released in the same two-part format, with the first batch of eleven episodes running from April 8 to June 17, 2026, and the second batch of eight episodes running from August 12 to September 30 of the same year. During its 10th anniversary event, a fifth season was announced.

Along with the first season's initial broadcast, a series of shorts featuring chibi style versions of the characters, titled Re:Zero − Starting Break Time From Zero (Re:ゼロから始める休憩時間(ブレイクタイム), Ri:Zero kara Hajimeru Bureiku Taimu) and produced by Studio Puyukai, aired on AT-X after each episode of the series, starting on April 8, 2016. It was replaced by a new series of shorts, titled Re:Petit − Starting Life in Another World from Petit (Re:プチから始める異世界生活, Ri:Puchi kara Hajimeru Isekai Seikatsu), which began airing on June 24, 2016. Additional episodes of Re:Zero − Starting Break Time From Zero were released alongside the following seasons.

== Series overview ==
Season	Episodes		Originally released	
Season	Episodes		First released	Last released
1	25		April 4, 2016	September 19, 2016
2	25	13	July 8, 2020	September 30, 2020
2	25	12	January 6, 2021	March 24, 2021
3	16	8	October 2, 2024	November 20, 2024
3	16	8	February 5, 2025	March 26, 2025
4	19	11	April 8, 2026	June 17, 2026
4	19	8	August 12, 2026	September 30, 2026

== Episodes ==
=== Season 1 (2016) ===
In January 2020, a "director's cut" of season one was released, altering some scenes and repackaging the season into 13 one-hour episodes.

No. overall	No. in season	Title	Directed by	Written by	Storyboarded by	Original release date
1	1	"The End of the Beginning and the Beginning of the End"; Transliteration: "Hajimari no Owari to Owari no Hajimari" (Japanese: 始まりの終わりと終わりの始まり)	Masaharu Watanabe	Masahiro Yokotani	Masaharu Watanabe	April 4, 2016 (Note: Episode 1 is a 52-minute special.)
2	2	"Reunion with the Witch"; Transliteration: "Saikai no Majo" (Japanese: 再会の魔女)	Masahiro Shinohara	Masahiro Yokotani	Kenichi Kawamura	April 11, 2016
3	3	"Starting Life from Zero in Another World"; Transliteration: "Zero kara Hajimaru Isekai Seikatsu" (Japanese: ゼロから始まる異世界生活)	Kazuomi Koga	Masahiro Yokotani	Masaharu Watanabe	April 18, 2016
4	4	"The Happy Roswaal Mansion Family"; Transliteration: "Rozuwāru-tei no Danran" (Japanese: ロズワール邸の団欒)	Yoshinobu Tokumoto	Masahiro Yokotani	Masayuki Sakoi	April 25, 2016
5	5	"The Morning of Our Promise Is Still Distant"; Transliteration: "Yakusoku Shita Asa wa Tōku" (Japanese: 約束した朝は遠く)	Daisuke Takashima	Masahiro Yokotani	Manabu Okamoto	May 2, 2016
6	6	"The Sound of Chains"; Transliteration: "Kusari no Oto" (Japanese: 鎖の音)	Hideyo Yamamoto	Yoshiko Nakamura	Shunsuke Nakashige	May 9, 2016
7	7	"Natsuki Subaru's Restart"; Transliteration: "Natsuki Subaru no Risutāto" (Japanese: ナツキ・スバルのリスタート)	Yoshito Mikamo	Yoshiko Nakamura	Masaharu Watanabe & Pyeon-Gang Ho	May 16, 2016
8	8	"I Cried, Cried My Lungs Out, and Stopped Crying"; Transliteration: "Naite Naki Wameite Naki Yandakara" (Japanese: 泣いて泣き喚いて泣き止んだから)	Manabu Okamoto	Masahiro Yokotani	Manabu Okamoto	May 23, 2016
9	9	"The Meaning of Courage"; Transliteration: "Yūki no Imi" (Japanese: 勇気の意味)	Hiroyuki Tsuchiya	Yoshiko Nakamura	Ryouki Kamitsubo	May 30, 2016
10	10	"Fanatical Methods Like a Demon"; Transliteration: "Oni Gakatta Yarikata" (Japanese: 鬼がかったやり方)	Yoshinobu Tokumoto	Masahiro Yokotani	Naoto Hosoda	June 6, 2016
11	11	"Rem"; Transliteration: "Remu" (Japanese: レム)	Daigo Yamagishi	Masahiro Yokotani	Daigo Yamagishi	June 13, 2016
12	12	"Return to the Capital"; Transliteration: "Sairai no Ōto" (Japanese: 再来の王都)	Daisuke Takashima	Masahiro Yokotani	Kazuhiro Ozawa	June 20, 2016
13	13	"Self-Proclaimed Knight Natsuki Subaru"; Transliteration: "Jishō Kishi Natsuki Subaru" (Japanese: 自称騎士ナツキ・スバル)	Kazuomi Koga	Masahiro Yokotani	Nobuyoshi Nagayama	June 27, 2016
14	14	"The Sickness Called Despair"; Transliteration: "Zetsubō to iu Yamai" (Japanese: 絶望という病)	Mamoru Taisuke	Eiji Umehara	Taisuke Mori	July 4, 2016
15	15	"The Outside of Madness"; Transliteration: "Kyōki no Sotogawa" (Japanese: 狂気の外側)	Hiroyuki Tsuchiya	Eiji Umehara	Naoto Hosoda	July 11, 2016
16	16	"The Greed of a Pig"; Transliteration: "Buta no Yokubō" (Japanese: 豚の欲望)	Yoshinobu Tokumoto	Yoshiko Nakamura	Shunsuke Nakashige	July 18, 2016
17	17	"Disgrace in the Extreme"; Transliteration: "Shūtai no Hate ni" (Japanese: 醜態の果てに)	Yoshito Mikamo	Yoshiko Nakamura	Takaharu Ozaki	July 25, 2016
18	18	"From Zero"; Transliteration: "Zero kara" (Japanese: ゼロから)	Kazuomi Koga	Yoshiko Nakamura	Nobuyoshi Nagayama	August 1, 2016
19	19	"Battle Against the White Whale"; Transliteration: "Hakugei Kōryaku Sen" (Japanese: 白鯨攻略戦)	Daisuke Takashima	Eiji Umehara	Shunsuke Nakashige	August 8, 2016
20	20	"Wilhelm van Astrea"; Transliteration: "Viruherumu van Asutorea" (Japanese: ヴィルヘルム・ヴァン・アストレア)	Hiroyuki Tsuchiya	Eiji Umehara	Masaharu Watanabe	August 15, 2016
21	21	"A Wager That Defies Despair"; Transliteration: "Zetsubō ni Aragau Kake" (Japanese: 絶望に抗う賭け)	Yoshinobu Tokumoto	Eiji Umehara	Masaharu Watanabe, Kenji Takahashi & Cagetzu Aizawa	August 22, 2016
22	22	"A Flash of Sloth"; Transliteration: "Taida Issen" (Japanese: 怠惰一閃)	Kenji Takahashi & Mamoru Taisuke	Masahiro Yokotani	Nobuyoshi Nagayama	August 29, 2016
23	23	"Nefarious Sloth"; Transliteration: "Akuratsu Naru Taida" (Japanese: 悪辣なる怠惰)	Yoshinobu Tokumoto	Masahiro Yokotani	Kazuhiro Ozawa	September 5, 2016
24	24	"The Self-Proclaimed Knight and the Greatest Knight"; Transliteration: "Jishō Kishi to Saiyū no Kishi" (Japanese: 自称騎士と最優の騎士)	Yoshito Mikamo	Yoshiko Nakamura	Yoshikazu Miyao	September 12, 2016
25	25	"That's All This Story Is About"; Transliteration: "Tada Soredakeno Monogatari" (Japanese: ただそれだけの物語)	Masaharu Watanabe	Masahiro Yokotani	Masaharu Watanabe	September 19, 2016

=== Season 2 (2020–2021) ===
==== Part 1 ====
No. overall	No. in season	Title	Directed by	Written by	Storyboarded by	Original release date
26	1	"Each One's Promise"; Transliteration: "Sorezore no Chikai" (Japanese: それぞれの誓い)	Masaharu Watanabe & Naoko Takeichi	Masahiro Yokotani	Masaharu Watanabe	July 8, 2020
27	2	"The Next Location"; Transliteration: "Tsuginaru Basho" (Japanese: 次なる場所)	Hiroyuki Tsuchiya	Yoshiko Nakamura	Masayuki Kojima	July 15, 2020
28	3	"The Long-Awaited Reunion"; Transliteration: "Machikaneta Saikai" (Japanese: 待ちかねた再会)	Kenichi Kawamura	Eiji Umehara	Kenichi Kawamura	July 22, 2020
29	4	"Parent and Child"; Transliteration: "Oyako" (Japanese: 親子)	Yoshito Mikamo	Yoshiko Nakamura	Masaharu Watanabe	July 29, 2020
30	5	"A Step Forward"; Transliteration: "Fumidashita Ippo" (Japanese: 踏み出した一歩)	Baito Akai	Masahiro Yokotani	Tomoyuki Kurokawa	August 5, 2020
31	6	"The Maiden's Gospel"; Transliteration: "Shōjo no Fukuin" (Japanese: 少女の福音)	Kazuhiro Ozawa	Eiji Umehara	Kazuhiro Ozawa	August 12, 2020
32	7	"Friend"; Transliteration: "Yūjin" (Japanese: ユージン)	Hiroyuki Tsuchiya	Yoshiko Nakamura	Hiroyuki Shimazu	August 19, 2020
33	8	"The Value of Life"; Transliteration: "Inochi no Kachi" (Japanese: 命の価値)	Baito Akai	Eiji Umehara	Kenichi Kawamura	August 26, 2020
34	9	"Love Love Love Love Love Love You"; Transliteration: "Rabu Rabu Rabu Rabu Rabu Rabu Yū" (Japanese: らぶらぶらぶらぶらぶらぶゆー)	Hiroyuki Tsuchiya	Eiji Umehara	Masayuki Sakoi	September 2, 2020
35	10	"I Know Hell"; Transliteration: "Jigoku nara Shitte iru" (Japanese: 地獄なら知っている)	Yoshito Mikamo	Masahiro Yokotani	Hiroyuki Shimazu	September 9, 2020
36	11	"The Taste of Death"; Transliteration: "Shi no Aji" (Japanese: 死の味)	Kazuhiro Ozawa & Baito Akai	Yoshiko Nakamura	Kazuhiro Ozawa	September 16, 2020
37	12	"The Witches' Tea Party"; Transliteration: "Majo-tachi no Chakai" (Japanese: 魔女たちの茶会)	Hiroyuki Tsuchiya	Masahiro Yokotani	Masaharu Watanabe	September 23, 2020
38	13	"The Sounds That Make You Want to Cry"; Transliteration: "Nakitakunaru Oto" (Japanese: 泣きたくなる音)	Kazuomi Koga	Eiji Umehara	Akira Nishimori	September 30, 2020

==== Part 2 ====
No. overall	No. in season	Title	Directed by	Written by	Storyboarded by	Original release date
39	14	"Straight Bet" (Note: Stylized in all caps)	Hiroyuki Tsuchiya	Yoshiko Nakamura	Kenichi Kawamura	January 6, 2021
40	15	"Otto Suwen"; Transliteration: "Ottō Sūwen" (Japanese: オットー・スーウェン)	Kazuhiro Ozawa	Yoshiko Nakamura	Kazuhiro Ozawa	January 13, 2021
40	15	"A Reason to Believe"; Transliteration: "Shinjiru Riyū" (Japanese: 信じる理由)	Kazuhiro Ozawa	Yoshiko Nakamura	Kazuhiro Ozawa	January 13, 2021
41	16	"Nobody Can Lift a Quain Stone Alone"; Transliteration: "Kuwein no Ishi wa Hitori ja Agaranai" (Japanese: クウェインの石は一人じゃ上がらない)	Kazuomi Koga	Eiji Umehara	Kazuomi Koga	January 20, 2021
42	17	"A Journey Through Memories"; Transliteration: "Kioku no Tabiji" (Japanese: 記憶の旅路)	Takashi Sakuma	Masahiro Yokotani	Hiroyuki Shimazu	January 27, 2021
43	18	"The Day Betelgeuse Laughed"; Transliteration: "Heikeboshi no Waratta Hi" (Japanese: 平家星の笑った日)	Yoshito Mikamo	Masahiro Yokotani	Kenichi Kawamura	February 3, 2021
44	19	"The Permafrost of Elior Forest"; Transliteration: "Eriōru Dai Shinrin no Eikyū Tōdo" (Japanese: エリオール大森林の永久凍土)	Hiroyuki Tsuchiya	Masahiro Yokotani	Goichi Iwahata	February 10, 2021
45	20	"The Beginning of the Sanctuary and the Beginning of the End"; Transliteration: "Seiiki no Hajimari to, Hōkai no Hajimari" (Japanese: 聖域の始まりと、崩壊の始まり)	Kazuomi Koga	Masahiro Yokotani	Goichi Iwahata	February 17, 2021
46	21	"Reunion of Roars"; Transliteration: "Hōkō no Saikai" (Japanese: 咆哮の再会)	Takashi Sakuma	Yoshiko Nakamura	Hiroyuki Shimazu	February 24, 2021
47	22	"Happiness Reflected on the Water's Surface"; Transliteration: "Minamo ni Utsuru Shiawase" (Japanese: 水面に映る幸せ)	Hiroyuki Tsuchiya	Eiji Umehara	Masayoshi Nishida	March 3, 2021
48	23	"Love Me Down to My Blood and Guts"; Transliteration: "Chi to Zōmotsu Made Aishite" (Japanese: 血と臓物まで愛して)	Kazuomi Koga	Eiji Umehara	Kenichi Kawamura	March 10, 2021
49	24	"Choose Me"; Transliteration: "Ore o Erabe" (Japanese: 俺を選べ)	Kazuhiro Ozawa	Yoshiko Nakamura	Kazuhiro Ozawa	March 17, 2021
50	25	"Offbeat Steps Under the Moonlight"; Transliteration: "Gekka, Detarame na Suteppu" (Japanese: 月下、出鱈目なステップ)	Masaharu Watanabe	Masahiro Yokotani	Masaharu Watanabe	March 24, 2021

=== Season 3 (2024–2025) ===
==== Attack Arc ====
No. overall	No. in season	Title	Directed by	Written by	Storyboarded by	Original release date
51	1	"Theatrical Malice"; Transliteration: "Gekijō-gata Akui" (Japanese: 劇場型悪意)	Masahiro Shinohara, Hiroyuki Tsuchiya & Risa Suzuki	Masahiro Yokotani	Masahiro Shinohara, Goichi Iwahata & Risa Suzuki	October 2, 2024 (Note: Episode 51 is a 90-minute special.)
52	2	"A Showdown of Fire and Ice"; Transliteration: "Hyōen no Ketsumatsu" (Japanese: 氷炎の結末)	Ichinosuke Akikaze	Yoshiko Nakamura	Shinji Itadaki	October 9, 2024
53	3	"Gorgeous Tiger"; Transliteration: "Gōjasu Taigā" (Japanese: ゴージャス・タイガー)	Takashi Nagayoshi	Masahiro Yokotani	Takashi Nagayoshi	October 16, 2024
54	4	"Operation: Take Back the Government Office"; Transliteration: "Toshi Chōsha Dakkan Sakusen" (Japanese: 都市庁舎奪還作戦)	Hiroyuki Tsuchiya	Eiji Umehara	Yasuaki Fujii	October 23, 2024
55	5	"A Dark Torrent"; Transliteration: "Dakuryū" (Japanese: 濁流)	Kazue Otsuki	Eiji Umehara	Susumu Nishizawa	October 30, 2024
56	6	"Conditions of the Knight"; Transliteration: "Kishi no Jōken" (Japanese: 騎士の条件)	Masahiro Shinohara, Ichinosuke Akikaze & Kazue Otsuki	Masahiro Yokotani	Masatoshi Hakada	November 6, 2024
57	7	"The Newest of Heroes and the Most Ancient of Heroes"; Transliteration: "Mottomo Atarashī Eiyū to Mottomo Furui Eiyū" (Japanese: 最も新しい英雄と最も古い英雄)	Masato Gotō	Yoshiko Nakamura	Masahiro Shinohara	November 13, 2024
58	8	"The One I'll Love Someday"; Transliteration: "Itsuka Sukininaru Hito" (Japanese: いつか好きになる人)	Hidekazu Hara	Yoshiko Nakamura	Ryūhei Aoyagi	November 20, 2024

==== Counterattack Arc ====
No. overall	No. in season	Title	Directed by	Written by	Storyboarded by	Original release date
59	9	"City Scramble"; Transliteration: "Konsen Toshi" (Japanese: 混戦都市)	Ichinosuke Akikaze	Masahiro Yokotani	Yasuaki Fujii	February 5, 2025
60	10	"The Plan to Conquer Greed"; Transliteration: "Gōyoku Kōryaku-sen" (Japanese: 強欲攻略戦)	Yasuaki Fujii	Eiji Umehara	Yasuaki Fujii	February 12, 2025
61	11	"Liliana Masquerade"; Transliteration: "Ririana Masukarēdo" (Japanese: リリアナ・マスカレード)	Hiroyuki Tsuchiya	Masahiro Yokotani	Goichi Iwahata	February 19, 2025
62	12	"Regulus Corneas"; Transliteration: "Regurusu Koruniasu" (Japanese: レグルス・コルニアス)	Kazue Otsuki	Yoshiko Nakamura	Shinji Itadaki	February 26, 2025
63	13	"The Warrior's Commendation"; Transliteration: "Senshi no Shōsan" (Japanese: 戦士の称賛)	Masahiro Shinohara	Eiji Umehara	Susumu Nishizawa & Masahiro Shinohara	March 5, 2025
64	14	"Theresia van Astrea"; Transliteration: "Tereshia van Asutorea" (Japanese: テレシア・ヴァン・アストレア)	Hinako Masaki	Eiji Umehara	Kazuhiro Ozawa	March 12, 2025
65	15	"A Hideous Dinner Party"; Transliteration: "Shūakunaru Bansan-kai" (Japanese: 醜悪なる晩餐会)	Ichinosuke Akikaze	Yoshiko Nakamura	Shinji Itadaki	March 19, 2025
66	16	"The Result of the Battle for Priestella"; Transliteration: "Purisutera Kōbō-sen Rizaruto" (Japanese: プリステラ攻防戦リザルト)	Mamiko Sekiya	Masahiro Yokotani	Ryūhei Aoyagi	March 26, 2025

=== Season 4 (2026) ===
==== Loss Arc ====
No. overall	No. in season	Title	Directed by	Written by	Storyboarded by	Original release date
67	1	"The Reason I'm Taking You With Me"; Transliteration: "Kimi o Tsuredasu Riyū" (Japanese: 君を連れ出す理由)	Masahiro Shinohara	Masahiro Yokotani	Shinji Itadaki	April 8, 2026
67	1	"Gorgeous Tiger Reloaded"; Transliteration: "Gōjasu Taigā Rirōdeddo" (Japanese: ゴージャス・タイガー・リローデッド)	Masahiro Shinohara	Masahiro Yokotani	Shinji Itadaki	April 8, 2026
68	2	"Overcome Sand Time"; Transliteration: "Suna Jikan o Koero" (Japanese: 砂時間を越えろ)	Hinako Masaki	Yoshiko Nakamura	Shinji Itadaki	April 15, 2026
69	3	"The Keeper of the Watchtower"; Transliteration: "Kanshi-tō no Ban'nin" (Japanese: 監視塔の番人)	Hidekazu Hara	Yoshiko Nakamura	Hidekazu Hara	April 22, 2026
70	4	"A White Sky Asterism"; Transliteration: "Shiroi Hoshizora no Asuterizumu" (Japanese: 白い星空のアステリズム)	Tamaki Nakatsu	Masahiro Yokotani	Kazue Otsuki	April 29, 2026
71	5	"Stick Swinger"; Transliteration: "Bōburi" (Japanese: 棒振り)	Takashi Nagayoshi	Yoshiko Nakamura	Yasuaki Fujii	May 6, 2026
72	6	"Julius Juukulius"; Transliteration: "Yuriusu Yūkuriusu" (Japanese: ユリウス・ユークリウス)	Daisuke Eguchi	Eiji Umehara	Goichi Iwahata & Masahiro Shinohara	May 13, 2026
73	7	"Walking Out of the Convenience Store and Into a Wondrous World"; Transliteration: "Konbini o Deru to, Soko wa Fushigi no Sekai Deshita" (Japanese: コンビニを出ると、そこは不思議の世界でした)	Kazuhiro Ozawa	Masahiro Yokotani	Kazuhiro Ozawa	May 20, 2026
74	8	"Who Are You?"; Transliteration: "Omae wa Dareda" (Japanese: オマエハダレダ)	Hinako Masaki	Yoshiko Nakamura	Shinji Itadaki	May 27, 2026
75	9	"Empty Shell"; Transliteration: "Zangai" (Japanese: 残骸)	Shinya Kawabe	Eiji Umehara	Shinji Itadaki	June 3, 2026
76	10	"Murder Is a Habit"; Transliteration: "Satsujin wa Kuse ni Naru" (Japanese: 殺人は癖になる)	Masato Gotō	Masahiro Yokotani	Kei Oikawa	June 10, 2026
77	11	"Re:Zero − Starting Life in Another World"; Transliteration: "Ri:Zero kara Hajimaru Isekai Seikatsu" (Japanese: Re:ゼロから始まる異世界生活)	Yūdai Ishikawa	Yoshiko Nakamura	Kazuhiro Ozawa	June 17, 2026

==== Recapture Arc ====
No. overall	No. in season	Title	Directed by	Written by	Storyboarded by	Original release date
78	12	"From Now On"; Transliteration: "Korekara no Hanashi" (Japanese: これからの話)	Tamaki Nakatsu	Eiji Umehara	Shinji Itadaki & Masahiro Shinohara	August 12, 2026
79	13	"Stand Up"; Transliteration: "Tachi Nasai" (Japanese: 立ちなさい)	Hinako Masaki	Masahiro Yokotani	Masahiro Shinohara	August 19, 2026
80	14	"Five Obstacles"; Transliteration: "Itsutsu no Shōgai" (Japanese: 五つの障害)	Shinya Kawabe	Yoshiko Nakamura	Shinji Itadaki	August 26, 2026
81	15	"A Single-Minded Star"; Transliteration: "Ichizuna Hoshi" (Japanese: 一途な星)	Hidekazu Hara	Eiji Umehara	Hidekazu Hara & Masayuki Kojima	September 2, 2026
82	16	"Subaru Natsuki"; Transliteration: "Natsuki Subaru" (Japanese: ナツキ・スバル)	Kazuhiro Ozawa	Masahiro Yokotani	Kazuhiro Ozawa	September 9, 2026
83	17	"Good Loser"; Transliteration: "Guddo Rūzā" (Japanese: グッドルーザー)	Akihisa Shibata & Hinako Masaki	Eiji Umehara	Takaharu Ozaki	September 16, 2026
84	18	"Ram"; Transliteration: "Ramu" (Japanese: ラム)	Tamaki Nakatsu	Yoshiko Nakamura	Tetsuya Miyanishi	September 23, 2026
85	19	"Shaula"; Transliteration: "Shaura" (Japanese: シャウラ)	Masahiro Shinohara, Kazue Otsuki & Yūsuke Maruyama	Masahiro Yokotani	Masahiro Shinohara	September 30, 2026
85	19	"Hero"; Transliteration: "Eiyū" (Japanese: 英雄)	Masahiro Shinohara, Kazue Otsuki & Yūsuke Maruyama	Masahiro Yokotani	Masahiro Shinohara	September 30, 2026

== OVAs (2018–2019) ==
No.	Title	Directed by	Written by	Storyboarded by	Original release date	Ref.
1	"Memory Snow"	Yoshito Mikamo & Kazuomi Koga	Masahiro Yokotani	Tatsuya Koyanagi	October 13, 2018	
Shortly after the Mabeast incident, Subaru goes the Village, looking for a spot for his date with Emilia, and chooses a hidden flower patch. Over the following days, the weather gets surprisingly colder, forcing the date to be postponed, though Emilia doesn't appear to be bothered by it. Subaru wakes up the next day to find the mansion frozen over by Puck, currently releasing all of his excess ice magic, with Emilia and Beatrice helping confine it to the mansion. To avoid freezing, Subaru suggests staying outside in the normal weather, but is halted by rain. He fails to find options to stay warm or quickly release the rest of Puck's magic, and as the ice is turning the rain outside into snow, he decides to host a Snow Festival, inviting the villagers to take part in a snow sculpture competition. While everyone has fun with the snow, Subaru tries to convince a recluse Beatrice to join, and eventually succeeds with Puck's help. Afterwards, the mansion residents celebrate with an afterparty, in which Emilia and Rem get drunk. Subaru talks to Beatrice about the constellations in the stars, revealing he got his name from one of them. While the rest of the group marvel at the snow spirits, Puck releases his remaining magic, sharing the snowfall with the rest of the people in the Capital. As Beatrice heads back inside, Roswaal pokes fun at her for not drinking because of Subaru's request. As the snow melts, Emilia and Puck reflect on Subaru's wish to host the festival again next year, though wondering if he'll still be with them then. She then meets Subaru outside as they head to the flower patch for their date. Note: This OVA takes place between episodes 11 and 12 of the anime television series.
2	"The Frozen Bond"; Transliteration: "Hyōketsu no Kizuna" (Japanese: 氷結の絆)	Kenichi Kawamura & Yūsuke Kubo	Masahiro Yokotani	Kenichi Kawamura & Yūsuke Kubo	November 8, 2019	
Shortly after her date with Subaru, Emilia reflects upon her history with Puck. In the past, Emilia saves a family from a Snow Blight, but they fearfully run away, as she resembles the Witch of Envy, and accidentally froze the father's arm. Emilia lives by herself in a frozen forest, occasionally heading to the nearby village for supplies. Puck frequently visits, and the two have fun together. One day, a group of villagers approach Emilia, saying that the village committed a crime by trading with a demi-human, and that she must give up her body to them or else they'll be punished; she reluctantly agrees. A Snow Blight suddenly attacks, and Emilia defeats it, but once again loses control of her magic and starts freezing the men. Puck stops her, and scares the men off. Waking up, Emilia returns to the village, and is ordered to never return. She reveals her identity, and instructs them not to enter the forest. The leader of the men, Chap, tries to get revenge on Emilia, but fails when Puck threatens him again; a red orb consumes Chap afterwards. Puck convinces Emilia to make a contract with lesser spirits, which she agrees to. Puck is later confronted by the red orb, which turns out to be Melakuera the Arbitrator, blaming Emilia for the unnaturally frozen forest, though Puck claims responsibility. Emilia, accompanied by her new spirits, discover a large black mass, revealed to be the Black Serpent's venom, starting to head to the village. Puck tries to stop it, but is halted by Melakuera, leading to a battle between the two. Emilia tries to divert the mass, but gets engulfed by it. Through her magic and the spirits' help, she completely freezes it. Her spirits are then destroyed by Chap, who's become a new vessel for Melakuera to act out his revenge. Emilia calls on Puck for help, who defeats Chap. Puck then reveals to Emilia that she is a half-elf, leading her to believe that she is the cause of the frozen forest. Melakuera appears to confirm this, trapping her in his flames. Puck rebukes that the black mass attack was orchestrated by Melakuera just to draw Emilia out, with him claiming it to be "fate". Puck then asks Emilia to form a contract with him; she's afraid to since she's worried he'll leave her, but he insists he never will, so she accepts. Transforming into his true form, the two beasts battle, and Puck wins. Puck and Emilia watch the sunset as she asks why he formed a contract with her now. He claims that he was not allowed to do so before because of his "oath", but felt that it was worth breaking. In the present, Emilia sees Subaru cleaning up their snow sculpture as it starts to melt. Subaru comments that there's no such thing as snow that doesn't melt, which causes Emilia to feel elated, thinking back to her forest, with Puck silently agreeing. Note: The present day scenes of this OVA take place between episodes 11 and 12 of the anime television series and almost immediately following Memory Snow, but mostly focuses on flashback events that occur before the first season.

== Break Time ==
=== Season 1 (2016) ===
No. overall	No. in season	Title	Original release date
1	1	"World 1-1"	April 8, 2016
Subaru and Emilia discuss how names in Lugunica are similar to those in Japan, such as apples (リンゴ, ringo) becoming appas (リンガ, ringa) and peppers (ピーマン, pīman) becoming pepples (ピーマル, pīmaru) Emilia admits that she hates pepples.
2	2	"World 1-4 Side A"	April 15, 2016
Felt is leading Subaru to the loot house, and he correctly guesses that she is taking a circuitous route. He then asks her to explain how people tell the time in Lugunica. She explains, but he interrupts her before she finishes, telling her that he can't possibly memorize it all.
3	3	"World 1-4 Epilogue"	April 22, 2016
Puck and Emilia discuss Reinhard and his divine protections, such as one that keeps him from being struck by arrows. They then discuss Subaru's role in saving them from Elsa and wonder who he is and where he came from.
4	4	"World 2-1"	April 29, 2016
Subaru asks the twins about a hand sign Rem made when he complimented her food, and Ram explains that it is used when one is happy. She then tries to trick him into believing that a random gesture he made in response is in fact offensive. Complaining about how unkindly she treats him, Subaru agrees to work hard in the mansion.
5	5	"World 2-2"	May 6, 2016
Subaru and Roswaal share a hot bath, and Subaru notices that Roswaal has removed his makeup. They then discuss how the water in the bath is changed each time someone uses it, and Subaru admits that he drank some when he believed that he had gotten in after Emilia, which is overheard by a disgusted Ram.
6	6	"World 2-3"	May 13, 2016
Emilia worries that she hasn't been able to do anything to thank Subaru. When Subaru unconsciously touches her hair, Puck tells him that he won't let Subaru pet him anymore after he "cheated" on him.
7	7	"World 2-4"	May 20, 2016
After he and Beatrice form a contract, Subaru asks her to teach him some things. She becomes irate when he attempts to give her a nickname.
8	8	"World 2-5 Side A"	May 27, 2016
After his rest on Emilia's lap, Subaru is feeling refreshed. When Ram criticizes him for this, he apologizes and says that he has now been looked down on by all the women at the mansion, to which the twins respond by calling him a masochist. When he leaves after Emilia, Ram notes that Rem has been watching Subaru a lot recently.
9	9	"World 2-5 Side B"	June 3, 2016
Subaru complains to Ram after she makes him carry a large barrel of food all the way back from the village, and she explains that she did it for his sake, not wanting Emilia to see Rem doing all the heavy lifting for him. After Rem worries that he and Ram are getting too close, Ram tells her that in his gratitude, Subaru has agreed to do the rest of the day's chores.
10	10	"World 2-5-3 Side C"	June 10, 2016
Subaru and Ram are searching for Rem in the forest, and Ram asks Subaru, who is tired, why he came along. He says that he promised to let Rem give him a haircut, and swears to work hard to make it happen.
11	11	"World 2-5 Epilogue"	June 17, 2016
Subaru and Emilia discuss the events of the week, and when Subaru accidentally angers Emilia, he apologizes profusely. Happy to have made it through the ordeal successfully, they discuss their date the next day.

=== Season 2 (2020–2021) ===
No. overall	No. in season	Title	Original release date
12	1	"Otto's Diary"; Transliteration: "Ottō Nikki" (Japanese: オットー日記)	July 8, 2020
After being saved from the Witch Cult, Otto is now working for Subaru. He recalls moments during those events and sees him as an old friend that he had met before. He thought to himself that Subaru may be from Kararagi, but he wasn't sure. Subaru enters the carriage and gave him encouraging banters, which made Otto a little bit embarrassed. He then tells Otto to hurry and meet with Roswaal.
13	2	"Otto's Diary"; Transliteration: "Ottō Nikki" (Japanese: オットー日記)	July 15, 2020
Otto meets Petra for the first time, who keeps mispronouncing his name.
14	3	"Otto's Diary"; Transliteration: "Ottō Nikki" (Japanese: オットー日記)	July 22, 2020
After encountering Garfiel and escorted to the Sanctuary, he finds himself stranded in the middle of nowhere. He suddenly noticed that Garfiel was right next to him. He tells Otto to go to Roswaal, but he was told by Ram to not visit him. He then asks him how did he know Frederica and Garf are related. Otto didn't understand what he meant and he thought that Subaru told him that and he insists that it was due to their sharp teeth, but Garfiel didn't get it. The episode ends with them trying to find the saying is either "The rushing ladybug folds leaves" or "The rushing ladybug blows up".
15	4	"The Diary of Petra's Struggles"; Transliteration: "Petora no Meido Funtō-ki" (Japanese: ペトラのメイド奮闘記)	July 29, 2020
Petra writes about her works at Roswaal Manor, including taking care of Rem and Beatrice as Subaru has asked.
16	5	"Otto's Diary"; Transliteration: "Ottō Nikki" (Japanese: オットー日記)	August 5, 2020
Otto recalls at the time when he before he joined Emilia's camp, he would compare Emilia to the Witch of Envy because she has the same looks as her. But seeing her kindness, and that she works hard to help others, he reconsiders her as a friend rather than an enemy.
17	6	"Otto's Diary"; Transliteration: "Ottō Nikki" (Japanese: オットー日記)	August 12, 2020
Ram and Subaru tease Otto by speaking as if they have just adopted a pet.
18	7	"Otto's Diary"; Transliteration: "Ottō Nikki" (Japanese: オットー日記)	August 19, 2020
Otto returns to Garfiel to talk about the deal they had made. He had decided to turn down the offer that Garfiel had made and had sided with Subaru. And with that, he returned the ore to Garfiel and quickly escaped to search for Subaru.
19	8	"Maid's Days"; Transliteration: "Meido-san Deizu" (Japanese: メイドさんデイズ)	August 26, 2020
Six days had passed since Petra worked as a maid at Roswaal Manor. Frederica recalled the time that Petra wanted to apply to work as a maid. She warns her that working as the mansion's maid takes a lot of hardships and dedication and it isn't easy to do. Despite her warnings, Petra is still obligated to work as a maid. And so, Frederica accepts her.
20	9	"Fang of Iron Report"; Transliteration: "Tetsu no Kiba Hōkoku-sho" (Japanese: 鉄の牙報告書)	September 2, 2020
Ricardo writes a report of the mission after the subjugation of the White Whale and the battle of the Witch Cult. Ricardo asks her about her report, but Tivey enters and told him that she didn't and he had to do it for her. Mimi exclaims that she did her report and takes out her book. They read through the report and recalled the time they had rescued Otto. Anastasia entered the room and sees them reminiscing what happened during that mission. Ricardo recalled that she and the Pearlbattons had been tied up before in the past, making Anastasia feel nostalgic about that time. The conversation ends as they all head to the meeting that they appointed for their next job.
21	10	"Maid's Days"; Transliteration: "Meido-san Deizu" (Japanese: メイドさんデイズ)	September 9, 2020
Petra recalls the time she first met Frederica.
22	11	"Diary of the Dark Work Sisters"; Transliteration: "Ura Kagyō Shimai An'yaku Nippō" (Japanese: 裏稼業姉妹暗躍日報)	September 16, 2020
Elsa and Meili have a chat after a mission, with reference to Subaru - their victim - as a boy with the look of "dead isn't the end".
23	12	"Maid's Days"; Transliteration: "Meido-san Deizu" (Japanese: メイドさんデイズ)	September 23, 2020
Frederica teaches Petra to properly address superiors, and asks Petra to call her "Frederica nee-sama". It is later revealed that Frederica's formal speech is pretty old-fashioned, due to her being brought up by her grandmother.
24	13	"Otto's Diary"; Transliteration: "Ottō Nikki" (Japanese: オットー日記)	September 30, 2020
Otto appreciates that Subaru has seen him as a reliable friend.
25	14	N/A	January 6, 2021
Ram considers Subaru's request to join his side in the bet with Roswaal. While Emilia is in despair, Roswaal's sitting in his room expecting Subaru to lose the bet. Meanwhile, Otto expresses his belief in Subaru's plan.
26	15	"Fang of Iron Report"; Transliteration: "Tetsu no Kiba Hōkoku-sho" (Japanese: 鉄の牙報告書)	January 13, 2021
Ricardo complains about Mimi being childish, but Anastasia protects her. Julius asks Anastasia about her greatest responsibility as a merchant, to which she answers "keeping promises", and states that she has a high regard for Otto for having that responsibility.
27	16	"Otto's Diary"; Transliteration: "Ottō Nikki" (Japanese: オットー日記)	January 20, 2021
Garfiel finds Otto's diary and has a look at it, only to learn that Otto has always kept a will in his diary, and why Otto never takes off his hat.
28	17	"Witch's Tea Confectionery"; Transliteration: "Majo no o Chagashi" (Japanese: 魔女のお茶菓子)	January 27, 2021
When Emilia is taking her first trial, Echidna admits that she is incompatible with Emilia's memories. It is also revealed that Echidna runs really slow and gets tired easily.
29	18	"Days Waiting for the Gospel"; Transliteration: "Fukuin o Matsu Hibi" (Japanese: 福音を待つ日々)	February 3, 2021
Beatrice recalls one time Geuse paid her and Echidna a visit, and is saddened as Geuse is now gone. She also deduces that Subaru could be "that one" she's waiting for.
30	19	"Otto's Diary"; Transliteration: "Ottō Nikki" (Japanese: オットー日記)	February 10, 2021
On their way to Roswaal to call for his surrender, Subaru, Otto and Garfiel have a discussion over how far Roswaal has planned everything ahead.
31	20	"Diary of the Dark Work Sisters"; Transliteration: "Ura Kagyō Shimai An'yaku Nippō" (Japanese: 裏稼業姉妹暗躍日報)	February 17, 2021
After receiving orders from Roswaal via a Metia, Elsa tells Meili that she hates Roswaal for being a disgusting person who doesn't cherish lives.
32	21	"Otto's Diary"; Transliteration: "Ottō Nikki" (Japanese: オットー日記)	February 24, 2021
Otto has a talk to Ram about their plan before leaving for the Manor.
33	22	"The Stone of the Miracle and the Path to the Miracle"; Transliteration: "Kiseki e no Kiseki" (Japanese: 奇跡へのキセキ)	March 3, 2021
Ram and Puck talks about Roswaal and Emilia, and that they both entrust Subaru with the ones they cherish.
34	23	"Witches' Tea Party"; Transliteration: "Majo no Ochakai" (Japanese: 魔女のお茶会)	March 10, 2021
The witches comment what they think about Emilia, and over her proposal for a tea party with all the witches. Echidna says that she's planning something, but refuses to further disclose.
35	24	N/A	March 17, 2021
Gazing at the ruin of the Mansion, Meili recalls the time Elsa revealed that her immortality was due to a curse, and is sad as now that she is lonely. Garfiel says it's OK for her to cry, which she does.
36	25	"Otto's Diary"; Transliteration: "Ottō Nikki" (Japanese: オットー日記)	March 24, 2021
Everyone has a small chat on a balcony before Subaru's accolade. Frederica tells Petra that as an older sister, she's glad Garfiel has found himself a trusted friend. She later comes speak to Garfiel and welcomes him home.

=== Season 3 (2024–2025) ===
No. overall	No. in season	Title	Original release date
37	1	"Night Tales of the Sleeping Oni"; Transliteration: "Nemureru Oni no Yawa" (Japanese: 眠れる鬼の夜話)	October 2, 2024
Subaru recounts to the sleeping Rem about how Mimi played with Beatrice's hair, sharing his hopes for Beatrice to try new experiences. He reflects on the way Emilia and Beatrice connect with him. For a moment, Subaru envisions Rem talking to him, and he vows that he will bring her back.
38	2	"Emilia Party Struggles"; Transliteration: "Emiria Jin'ei Funtō-ki" (Japanese: エミリア陣営奮闘記)	October 9, 2024
Petra, Frederica, and Ram talk about their various attitudes towards their employer, Roswaal.
39	3	"Chomp of Love and Passion"; Transliteration: "Ai to Jōnetsu no Gaburi" (Japanese: アイとジョーネツのガブリ)	October 16, 2024
At the entrance to the mansion, Mimi becomes enamored with Garfiel, leading to a heated argument about his name, before Ram reminds him to lead Mimi inside.
40	4	"Doki-Doki Royal Selection Social Gathering"; Transliteration: "Doki-Doki-Ō-sen Konshin-kai" (Japanese: ドキドキ王選懇親会)	October 23, 2024
During a visit to the royal capital, Subaru, Emilia, and Beatrice meet up with Crusch and Felix. Felix notices that Subaru's Gate is completely broken and reveals that without Beatrice feeding on his mana due to their contract, his body would eventually explode from the daily accumulation of mana.
41	5	"Great Waterfalls Followers"; Transliteration: "Dai Bakufu Forowāzu" (Japanese: 大瀑布フォロワーズ)	October 30, 2024
Al pays a visit to Subaru and Beatrice at the Priestella inn. He then repeats a peculiar saying to Subaru, making the latter realize that Al was also summoned from Japan. Al reveals that he was summoned nineteen years ago and that Subaru was the first person he met that was in a similar situation, before reminding Beatrice to look after him.
42	6	"Great Waterfalls Followers"; Transliteration: "Dai Bakufu Forowāzu" (Japanese: 大瀑布フォロワーズ)	November 6, 2024
Al and Subaru talk about how normally, no one would believe their outlandish origins due to everyone believing that nobody could arrive from beyond the Great Waterfall at the edge of the world. However, Al recounts about how Priscilla was willing to hear him out due to his peculiar appearance. He then bids Subaru and Beatrice farewell to go look for Priscilla.
43	7	"Doki-Doki Royal Selection Social Gathering"; Transliteration: "Doki-Doki-Ō-sen Konshin-kai" (Japanese: ドキドキ王選懇親会)	November 13, 2024
44	8	"Doki-Doki Royal Selection Social Gathering"; Transliteration: "Doki-Doki-Ō-sen Konshin-kai" (Japanese: ドキドキ王選懇親会)	November 20, 2024
45	9	"Emilia Party Struggles"; Transliteration: "Emiria Jin'ei Funtō-ki" (Japanese: エミリア陣営奮闘記)	February 5, 2025
46	10	"Pre-Theatrical Malice"; Transliteration: "Gekijō-zen Akui" (Japanese: 劇場前悪意)	February 12, 2025
47	11	"Scarlet Romantic Tales"; Transliteration: "Hiiro Roman-tan" (Japanese: 緋色浪漫譚)	February 19, 2025
48	12	"Emilia Party Struggles"; Transliteration: "Emiria Jin'ei Funtō-ki" (Japanese: エミリア陣営奮闘記)	February 26, 2025
49	13	"Emilia Party Struggles"; Transliteration: "Emiria Jin'ei Funtō-ki" (Japanese: エミリア陣営奮闘記)	March 5, 2025
50	14	"Emilia Party Struggles"; Transliteration: "Emiria Jin'ei Funtō-ki" (Japanese: エミリア陣営奮闘記)	March 12, 2025
51	15	"Emilia Party Struggles"; Transliteration: "Emiria Jin'ei Funtō-ki" (Japanese: エミリア陣営奮闘記)	March 19, 2025
52	16	"Emilia Party Struggles"; Transliteration: "Emiria Jin'ei Funtō-ki" (Japanese: エミリア陣営奮闘記)	March 26, 2025

=== Season 4 (2026) ===
No. overall	No. in season	Title	Original release date
53	1	"Emilia Party Struggles"; Transliteration: "Emiria Jin'ei Funtō-ki" (Japanese: エミリア陣営奮闘記)	April 8, 2026
Ram reports to Roswaal regarding the state of the mansion following a recent trip he took, but gets too close to his personal space, much to the delight of Petra and Frederica.
54	2	"Emilia Party Struggles"; Transliteration: "Emiria Jin'ei Funtō-ki" (Japanese: エミリア陣営奮闘記)	April 15, 2026
Petra visits Meili in her room and strikes up a conversation regarding the former's opinion of Roswaal along with expressing hope that Meili will change her ways following continued interactions with the mansion's residents.
55	3	"Everyone Is Quite a Handful, I Suppose."; Transliteration: "Min'na Komatta mon Kashira" (Japanese: みんな困ったもんかしら)	April 22, 2026
While preparing for their departure, Subaru reveals the truth about Foxidna/Anastasia to Beatrice, who is immediately forced to coverup this revelation when Emilia startles them, having partially overheard them. However, Emilia misinterprets their conversation as Beatrice wanting to be friends with Anastasia.
56	4	"Everyone Is Quite a Handful, I Suppose."; Transliteration: "Min'na Komatta mon Kashira" (Japanese: みんな困ったもんかしら)	April 29, 2026
After Ram wakes up following the deep sleep she had in the carriage, she becomes mortified upon learning that Subaru held onto her tightly during their sleeping arrangement.
57	5	"Walk-the-Talk Log"; Transliteration: "Yūgen Jikkō Bibōroku" (Japanese: 有言実行備忘録)	May 6, 2026
In Priestella, Julius watches over his brother Joshua, who fell into a coma after both his name and memories were consumed by Gluttony. Ricardo pays a visit and despite not remembering Julius, reintroduces himself to him and entrusts Anastasia's safety to Julius.
58	6	"Walk-the-Talk Log"; Transliteration: "Yūgen Jikkō Bibōroku" (Japanese: 有言実行備忘録)	May 13, 2026
Julius showcases his chivaric nature to Anastasia, but she gets intimidated by his overbearing personality. Using Emilia to distract Julius, Subaru tells Foxidna that he will keep Julius in check, but gets mad when he sees Emilia trying to massage Julius' facial wrinkles.
59	7	"Walk-the-Talk Log"; Transliteration: "Yūgen Jikkō Bibōroku" (Japanese: 有言実行備忘録)	May 20, 2026
Subaru talks with Julius about the latter attempting to rebuild his relationships from scratch. Julius declares that despite his current status, he will attempt to regain his old life back, which Subaru affirms is his the desired choice.
60	8	"The Wiry-Armed Success in Kararagi"; Transliteration: "Kararagi Hosoude Hanjō-ki" (Japanese: カララギ細腕繁盛期)	May 27, 2026
Foxidna recounts to Julius the details of how she first met Anastasia during the latter's childhood.
61	9	"Emilia Party Struggles"; Transliteration: "Emiria Jin'ei Funtō-ki" (Japanese: エミリア陣営奮闘記)	June 3, 2026
While Garfiel visits Otto in the hospital, the two of them lament how they weren't able to accompany Subaru's party to the Auguria Dunes, but vow to get stronger for when they return.
62	10	"Emilia Party Struggles"; Transliteration: "Emiria Jin'ei Funtō-ki" (Japanese: エミリア陣営奮闘記)	June 10, 2026
Felt and Reinhard visit Otto, with Felt thanking Otto for his help in freeing her when she was held hostage by Reinhard's father. The three of them reflect on the paths they traveled in life and wish each other luck before Felt and Reinhard depart.
63	11	"Golden Lion & the Sword Saint"; Transliteration: "Kinshishi to Ken Sei" (Japanese: 金獅子と剣聖)	June 17, 2026
64	12	"Diary of the Dark Work Sisters"; Transliteration: "Ura Kagyō Shimai An'yaku Nippō" (Japanese: 裏稼業姉妹暗躍日報)	August 12, 2026
65	13	"Golden Lion & the Sword Saint"; Transliteration: "Kinshishi to Ken Sei" (Japanese: 金獅子と剣聖)	August 19, 2026
66	14	"Golden Lion & the Sword Saint"; Transliteration: "Kinshishi to Ken Sei" (Japanese: 金獅子と剣聖)	August 26, 2026
67	15	"Cheers for Me"; Transliteration: "Mekake Banzai" (Japanese: 妾バンザイ)	September 2, 2026
68	16	"Cheers for Me"; Transliteration: "Mekake Banzai" (Japanese: 妾バンザイ)	September 9, 2026
69	17	"The Pleiades Travelogue"; Transliteration: "Mutsuraboshi Manyū-ki" (Japanese: 六連星漫遊記)	September 16, 2026
70	18	"The Pleiades Travelogue"; Transliteration: "Mutsuraboshi Manyū-ki" (Japanese: 六連星漫遊記)	September 23, 2026
71	19	"Scorpion Tail"; Transliteration: "Sasori no Otogi-banashi" (Japanese: サソリのおとぎ話)	September 30, 2026

== Re:Petit (2016) ==
No.	Title	Original release date
1	"Return to School"; Transliteration: "Sairai no Gakkō" (Japanese: 再来の学校)	June 24, 2016
Subaru wakes up to find himself in a classroom where Emilia is a teacher. Attempting to ask her about Puck, she tells him that the familiar is the school's principal. After his questions disrupt class and he is sent to stand in the hall, Subaru vows to return to his own world, before wondering what world that really is.
2	"Beatrice, Self-Proclaimed Teacher"; Transliteration: "Jishō Sensei, Beatorisu" (Japanese: 自称先生、ベアトリス)	July 1, 2016
Subaru is shocked to find that he is in the same class as Felt, and even more surprised to discover that their teacher is Beatrice. When he expresses his disbelief that someone who looks so much like a child could be a teacher, she tickles him. He tells her that he thought she was going to suck his mana out, and both her and Felt mishear him as saying "mayo".
3	"The Master and His Maids"; Transliteration: "Goshujinsama to, Sono Meido-tachi" (Japanese: ご主人様と、そのメイドたち)	July 8, 2016
Subaru visits a maid café where Ram and Rem work, and finds that all they serve is steamed potatoes. When he pays them 500 yen (approximately $3.16) to assume a "special pose", Ram sneers at him, and when he asks for some "maid service", Ram attempts to crush his head with her fist (a Japanese word for underworld, 冥土, is also pronounced meido).
4	"That Menu Item Is..."; Transliteration: "Sono Menyū wa―――" (Japanese: そのメニューは―――)	July 15, 2016
Visiting a café where Beatrice and Anastasia work, Subaru orders their most popular item, a Meow Meow Omelet. The omelet is delivered by Puck, who then eats it.
5	"Ditz"; Transliteration: "Ten'nen" (Japanese: 天然)	July 22, 2016
At an arcade Subaru meets with Felt who finding her arcade coin while explaining she's having a game contest with Reinhard. Failing to retrieve her only coin Emilia suggests a game machine to Felt that give coins.
6	"Greed That Isn't a Pig's"; Transliteration: "Butadenai Yokubō" (Japanese: 豚でない欲望)	July 29, 2016
Once again Subaru met Felt reaching for a coin under the crane game machine, this time Priscilla walks in on them. Felt managed to retrieve her coin this time and is about to head off to contest Reinhard when Priscilla produced an "Old Man Rom" plush toy offering to give it to Felt on the condition that she bow down to her. Felt rejected the offer as the contest is between herself and Reinhard and it would be wrong to obtain a prize that way, she then heads off to get a toy.
7	"From Zero"; Transliteration: "Zero kara" (Japanese: ゼロから)	August 5, 2016
Subaru attends a doujin event (Comiket) and is surprised that Rem is in a circle. He proceeds to read the book she made and it describes everything that Rem knew about Subaru to a disturbing accuracy. As expected zero volumes were sold and Rem used her famous quote "Let's start here from square one, no from zero!".
8	"The Day of the Battle"; Transliteration: "Kessen Tōjitsu" (Japanese: 決戦当日)	August 12, 2016
At the same event as the previous episode, Subaru found Crusch and asked her what she learnt from the event, awhile later Priscilla joins in the conversation. Subaru thought that Priscilla is about to say unpleasant things about the attendees of the event however to his surprise she express positive interest in them. Priscilla then forcefully drags Subaru to the 18+ section of the event with Crusch in tow.
9	"Conquering the Watermelon"; Transliteration: "Suika Kōryaku-sen" (Japanese: スイカ攻略戦)	August 19, 2016
Subaru appears at a beach (reference to fanservice episodes), he compliments Crusch's and Rem's swimsuit accordingly. Rem suggests that they play Suikawari since they are at the beach. Crusch was the first to try and she claim to be able to hit the watermelon in one swing. Rem is up next however she used her watermelon designed Flail instead and smashed the watermelon. Anastasia popped in and expressed her disappointment for not being able to sell the ruined watermelon.
10	"Just Resisting Desires of the Flesh"; Transliteration: "Bon'nō Ni Aragau Dake" (Japanese: 煩悩に抗うだけ)	August 26, 2016
Subaru wakes up to find himself immobile and buried up to his neck under the sand and thought it was Ram being mean to him. Emilia cleared up the misunderstanding and explained they were trying to prevent him from getting sunburn. Eventually Subaru requested help from both of them to be freed and while Emilia was digging up the sand he got his reward.
11	"That and That and (Omitted) at Checkout"; Transliteration: "Are to Are to (Ikaryaku) no Seisan" (Japanese: アレトアレと（以下略）の精算)	September 2, 2016
Subaru goes to a convenience store to buy a bottle of cola when he saw Anastasia as the cashier. Anastasia managed to persuade Subaru to spend up to 100K yen in total through deals and discounts, Priscilla enters the store and decides to buy everything it has which led to Anastasia ignoring Subaru to serve her rich customer.
12	"Buy It"; Transliteration: "―――Kae" (Japanese: ―――買え)	September 9, 2016
Subaru entered another convenience store and is excited that Emilia is the cashier. Subaru proceeds to order a soft-serve ice-cream which Emilia went to the back of the store to make and told the Manager who is Puck to man the cashier. Puck tries to convince Subaru to buy fried chicken by talking directly into his mind. When Emilia eventually returns, Puck falsely states that Subaru ordered fried chicken. Subaru eventually agreed to give Puck and Emilia a treat after Puck convinced him that he could share the ice cream with Emilia.
13	"The Book the Lion King Saw"; Transliteration: "Shishiōnomita Hon" (Japanese: 獅子王のみた本)	September 16, 2016
Subaru enters a bookstore and is greeted unpleasantly by Beatrice as the cashier. Beatrice later accuses Subaru of entering the store to browse undesirable books and even hired Crusch as a part timer discern if Subaru will ogles at the aforementioned books or not. Crusch proceeds to use her ability on Subaru while he comments on the unusual sound effect, she declares that Subaru has no intention of reading those book shocking Beatrice. Crusch however states that the result only applies at that instance. Subaru ends up buying the series's Light Novel volumes and shamelessly promotes it and himself.
14	"That's All This Promotion Is About"; Transliteration: "Tada Soredake no Senden" (Japanese: ただそれだけの宣伝)	September 23, 2016
Subaru and Emilia are cashiers at a certain store to promote the release of the series's DVDs and BDs, as they amicably mention how Puck put in his best effort for the day Rem, Ram and Beatrice enter the store to buy the products. When Subaru was about to pack Ram's order, Satella used her unseen hand to purchase a copy whilst promoting the bonus and sale of the series's DVD and BD. Ram reminds Subaru of her order again and while he reaffirms the order he realized his copy of the product was gone and Puck sold it while Subaru was on a break. Emilia and Rem proposes that everyone watch the series together at the end.
