= Realize (Konomi Suzuki song) =

Single by Konomi Suzuki
- Released: August 26, 2020
- Recorded: 2020
- Genre: J-pop
- Label: Sony, Kadokawa
- Songwriters: Ayato Shinozaki, Ryosuke Tachibana
- Composers: Ayato Shinozaki, Ryosuke Tachibana

Konomi Suzuki singles chronology
"Theater of Life" (2020)	"Realize" (2020)

Music video
- "Realize" on YouTube

"Realize" is a song by Japanese pop singer Konomi Suzuki. It was released as her eighteenth single on August 26, 2020. It reached number 38 on Oricon and number 86 on Japan Hot 100. It was used as the opening theme to the second season of Re:Zero − Starting Life in Another World. This single was originally scheduled to be released on May 13, 2020, but was delayed due to the postponement of the anime because of the COVID-19 pandemic.

== Release ==
On 15 January 2020, the official website of the anime Re:Zero − Starting Life in Another World revealed about the opening theme song "Realize" would be sung by Konomi Suzuki. The single was released on 26 August 2020. The single was originally scheduled to be released on May 13, 2020, but was delayed due to the postponement of the anime because of the COVID-19 pandemic. The single reached number 38 on Oricon, 86 on Japan Hot 100, and 8 on Japan Hot Animation.

== Music video ==
The music video for "Realize" was directed by Hiro. The video show Konomi Suzuki singing the song with fire effects surrounding her (red and blue flames). Some scenes also show her holding the flower, and also she sings with a grey background.

== Track listing ==
=== Regular edition ===
CD
No.	Title	Length
1.	"Realize"	4:04
2.	"A Beautiful Mistake"	3:58
3.	"Realize" (Instrumental)	4:04
4.	"A Beautiful Mistake" (Instrumental)	3:58

== Charts ==
Year	Chart	Peak position
2020	Oricon	38
2020	Japan Hot 100	86
2020	Japan Hot Animation	8

== Release history ==
Region	Date	Label	Format	Catalog
Japan	26 August 2020	Kadokawa	CD	ZMCZ-14011
