= Nonoc =

- Born: July 12; Utashinai, Hokkaido
- Genre: Anison
- Occupation: Singer
- Years active: 2018–present
- Labels: Kadokawa (2018–2024); New World Line (2024 – present)
- Website: https://nonoc.bitfan.id/

Nonoc (stylized as nonoc, born July 12) is a Japanese singer from Utashinai, Hokkaido who was affiliated with Kadokawa Corporation until 2024, when she joined the brand-new record label New World Line.

== Career ==
She made her debut in 2018 with the release of the songs "Relive" and "White White Snow", which were used in the original video animation Re:Zero − Starting Life in Another World: Memory Snow. Her first single "Kodo" was released on February 27, 2019, and peaked at number 70 on Oricon's weekly singles charts. The title track is used as the opening theme to the anime television series Magical Girl Spec-Ops Asuka. Her second single entitled "start*frost" was released on August 7, 2019—this time the song was played for opening theme to the anime television series Astra Lost in Space, while the second song "Hollow Veil" was used as the episode 5 ending theme to the anime Isekai Quartet. Her third single "Memento" was released on September 2, 2020—and is used as the initial ending theme to the second season of Re:Zero − Starting Life in Another World. Her digital single "Reloaded" was used as the theme song of the game, "Re:Zero − Starting Life in Another World Lost in Memories". Her fourth single "Believe in you" was released on March 3, 2021, where the title song was used as the second ending theme to the second season of Re:Zero − Starting Life in Another World.

Her fifth single "Change" was released on February 2, 2022—where the title song was used as the ending theme to the anime television series Police in a Pod. Her sixth single, "Tomoshibi", was used as the opening theme to the anime television series Spy Classroom and released on January 25, 2023. Her seventh single, "Rakuen", was used as the opening theme to the second season of the anime television series Spy Classroom and released on August 2, 2023.

On February 3, 2024, it was announced that she joined the record label New World Line and transferred all of her activities from Hokkaido to Tokyo to start a "new Phase" of her career.

== Discography ==
=== Albums ===
| Title | Album details | Peak chart positions | | | Sales (JPN) |
| Title | Album details | JPN | JPN DS | JPN Hot | Sales (JPN) |
|---|---|---|---|---|---|
| A Photon Away | Released: October 28, 2026 (JPN); Label: New World Line; Formats: Streaming, download | — | — | — | |
"—" denotes releases that did not chart.

=== Extended plays ===
| Title | EP details | Peak chart positions | | | Sales (JPN) |
| Title | EP details | JPN | JPN DS | JPN Hot | Sales (JPN) |
|---|---|---|---|---|---|
| "Unmarked Story" (栞のない物語) | Released: August 21, 2025 (JPN); Label: New World Line; Formats: CD, streaming, download | — | — | — | |
"—" denotes releases that did not chart.

=== Singles ===
| Title | Year | Peak chart positions | | Sales | Album |
| Title | Year | JPN | JPN Hot | Sales | Album |
|---|---|---|---|---|---|
| "Kodo" | 2019 | 70 | — (Note: "Kodo" did not enter the Japan Hot 100 but peaked at number 54 on Download Songs chart.) | | A Photon Away |
| "star*frost" | 2019 | 105 | — (Note: "star*frost" did not enter the Japan Hot 100 but peaked at number 97 on Download Songs chart.) | | Non-album singles |
| "Memento" | 2020 | 25 | 100 | JPN: 1,513 | Non-album singles |
| "Believe in you" | 2021 | 50 | — (Note: "Believe in you" did not enter the Japan Hot 100 but peaked at number 33 on Download Songs chart.) | JPN: 780 | Non-album singles |
| "Change" | 2022 | 83 | — | | Non-album singles |
| "Tomoshibi" (灯火) | 2023 | 113 | — (Note: "Tomoshibi" did not enter the Japan Hot 100 but peaked at number 74 on Download Songs chart.) | | Non-album singles |
| "Rakuen" (楽園) | 2023 | 115 | — | | Non-album singles |
"—" denotes releases that did not chart.

==== Digital singles ====
| Title | Year | Peak chart positions | | Sales (digital) | Album |
| Title | Year | JPN DS | JPN DL | Sales (digital) | Album |
|---|---|---|---|---|---|
| "Reloaded" | 2020 | — | — | | Non-album single |
| "On the other side of the door" (ドアの向こう) | 2024 | — | — | | A Photon Away |
| "Monologue" (モノローグ) | 2025 | — | — | | A Photon Away |
| "Float time" | 2026 | — | — | | A Photon Away |
| "Weightless" | 2026 | — | — | | A Photon Away |
"—" denotes releases that did not chart.

=== Other appearances ===
List of guest appearances that feature nonoc
| Title | Year | Album | Peak |
|---|---|---|---|
| "Relive" | 2018 | Re:Zero Kara Hajimeru Isekai Seikatsu OVA: Memory Snow OST by Kenichiro Suehiro | 134 |
| "White White Snow" | 2018 | Re:Zero Kara Hajimeru Isekai Seikatsu OVA: Memory Snow OST by Kenichiro Suehiro | 134 |
| "Gaze (PC Game Kosai Toshi Opening Theme)" | 2025 | PC Game Kosai Toshi Opening Theme by Visual Arts/Key | — |
"—" denotes releases that did not chart.
