= Konomi Suzuki =

Japanese singer

Konomi Suzuki 鈴木 このみ
- Born: November 5, 1996 (age 29); Osaka Prefecture, Japan
- Genres: J-pop; anison
- Occupation: Singer
- Instruments: Vocals; guitar
- Years active: 2012–present
- Labels: Sony Music (2012); Media Factory (2012–2017); MAGES. (2018–2021); Kadokawa (2020–present)
- Website: konomi-suzuki.net

Konomi Suzuki (鈴木 このみ, Suzuki Konomi) is a Japanese singer from Osaka Prefecture who is affiliated with Kadokawa. After winning the Animax All-Japan Anisong Grand Prix in 2011, she made her debut in 2012 with the release of her first single "Choir Jail", which peaked at 34 on the Oricon charts; the title track of which was used as the opening theme to the anime television series Dusk Maiden of Amnesia. She released her first album 17, in 2014, two albums in 2015, and a further album Lead, in 2016.

Suzuki cites the character Sheryl Nome from Macross Frontier as her inspiration for making music for anime. Her music has been featured in anime series such as The Pet Girl of Sakurasou, No Matter How I Look at It, It's You Guys' Fault I'm Not Popular!, No Game No Life, and Re:Zero − Starting Life in Another World. She has also performed in events in Japan such as Animelo Summer Live and Animax Musix, and at international events in China, Germany, the United States, and Southeast Asia. In 2018, Suzuki made her voice acting debut, playing the role of Rin in the anime television series Lost Song.

== Career ==
Suzuki was born in Osaka, Japan as the youngest of three children. She began aspiring to become a singer at a young age, taking dance lessons with the encouragement of her mother, and participating in singing competitions by the age of six. After being inspired in high school by the character Sheryl Nome from the anime series Macross Frontier, she decided that she wanted to become an anison singer. She applied for the Animax All-Japan Anisong Grand Prix in 2010 but failed to qualify.

Suzuki started her musical career after winning the Animax All-Japan Anisong Grand Prix in 2011 signed into Sony Music Japan. Her first single "Choir Jail" was released on April 25, 2012, as the opening theme for the 2012 anime television series Dusk Maiden of Amnesia. She also made a voice acting cameo during the series' fifth episode. "Choir Jail" peaked at number 34 on the Oricon weekly charts and charted for nine weeks.

Suzuki's singles have corresponded with anime themes for much of her career. Her second single, "Days of Dash", was released in November 2012 as The Pet Girl of Sakurasou's ending theme. She made her first live concert appearance at Animelo Summer Live in August 2012, followed by Animax Musix in November 2012. Her third single "Yume no Tsuzuki" (夢の続き) was released in February 2013 as the second opening theme to The Pet Girl of Sakurasou. Her fourth single was a double-release titled "Watashi ga Motenai no wa dō Kangaetemo Omaera ga Warui!/Tears Breaker" (私がモテないのはどう考えてもお前らが悪い!/TEARS BREAKER), a collaboration in August 2013 with the band Kiba of Akiba. and the songs were used in the 2013 anime television series No Matter How I Look at It, It's You Guys' Fault I'm Not Popular!, and in an animated promotional video for the trading card game Ange Vierge. Her fifth single "Avenge World/Sekai wa Kizu o Dakishimeru" (Avenge World／世界は疵を抱きしめる) was released in November 2013, as the opening and ending themes to the anime television series Freezing Vibration.

Suzuki released her first album 17 in February 2014. Her sixth single "This Game" was released in May 2014, and was used as the opening theme to No Game No Life. Her seventh single "Ginsen no Kaze" (銀閃の風) was released in November 2014, and was used as the opening theme to Lord Marksman and Vanadis. Her eighth single "Absolute Soul" was released in February 2015 as the opening theme to Absolute Duo. She released her second album 18: Colorful Gift in March 2015, and a mini-album titled 18: More in October 2015. She transferred to the talent agency Amuleto in January 2016. Her ninth single "Beat Your Heart" was released in January 2016 as the opening theme to BBK/BRNK. Her tenth single "Redo" was released in May 2016, and was used as the first opening theme to Re:Zero − Starting Life in Another World. Her eleventh single "Love is My Rail" was released in August 2016 as the opening theme to anime adaptation of Ange Vierge.

Her twelfth single "Chaos Syndrome" was released in February 2017 as the ending theme to Chaos;Child. Suzuki made an appearance at Anime Festival Asia in Singapore in November 2016. During a birthday live held at Makuhari Messe on November 5, 2016, it was announced that she would make her voice acting debut as the heroine of the anime series Lost Song, a new anime project produced by Mages.

Suzuki released her third album Lead in March 2017, and her thirteenth single "Blow Out" was released in May 2017; the title track was used as the opening theme to the 2017 anime television series Akashic Records of Bastard Magic Instructor. She made an appearance at Anime Expo in Los Angeles in July 2017, and at Germany's AnimagiC anime convention in August 2017. Her song "There is a Reason" was used as the theme song for anime film No Game No Life Zero; the song was included on the album No Song No Life in July 2017. She appeared at Anime Festival Asia Indonesia in August 2017, Cosplay Mania in the Philippines in October 2017, and Anime Festival Asia Singapore in November 2017. She released the compilation album Life of Dash in December 2017. Her fourteenth single "Utaeba Soko ni Kimi ga Iru Kara" (歌えばそこに君がいるから, If I Sing, You Will Be There), released in May 2018, was used as the opening theme for Lost Song.

In 2018, Suzuki returned to AnimagiC and also performed at Asia Comic Con in Bangkok and Penang Anime Matsuri in Malaysia. Her fifteenth single "Ao no Kanata" (蒼の彼方, Beyond the Blue) was released in October 2018; the title song was used for the anime series Between the Sky and Sea and features Suzuki playing guitar. She performed at New York's Anime NYC event in November 2018, and at Ressaca Friends in São Paulo, Brazil, in December 2018.

In January 2019, her song "aNubis" was used in the video game Robotics;Notes DaSH. Her sixteenth single "Shinri no Kagami, Ken no Yō ni" (真理の鏡、剣乃ように, Mirror of Truth, Like a Sword) was released in May 2019; the title track is used as the ending theme to the anime series YU-NO: A Girl Who Chants Love at the Bound of this World. She made an appearance at SMASH! in Sydney, Australia in July 2019. She went on an Asian tour in the second half of 2019, with performances in Shanghai, Hong Kong, and Taiwan. She released her fourth album Shake Up! in November 2019.

In January 2020, Suzuki's management announced that she had transferred to the talent agency Double Digital, a newly formed subsidiary of internet company CyberAgent. She released her seventeenth single "Theater of Life" in July 2020, which was used as the opening theme to the anime series Deca-Dence. She released her eighteenth single "Realize" in August 2020, which was used as the opening theme to the second season of Re:Zero − Starting Life in Another World. (Note: This single was originally scheduled to be released on May 13, 2020, but was delayed due to the postponement of the anime. The anime was delayed due to the COVID-19 pandemic.) Her nineteenth single "Maioritekita Yuki" (舞い降りてきた雪) was released in September 2020, which was used as the ending theme of the anime series Mr Love: Queen's Choice. In October 2020, Suzuki announced she would go on a hiatus in December 2020 for vocal cord surgery. After returning from her hiatus, she released her twentieth single "Bursty Greedy Spider" in May 2021, which was used as the second opening theme to the anime series So I'm a Spider, So What?. Her twenty-first single "Missing Promise" was released on August 25, 2021, which was used as the ending theme of the anime series Higurashi When They Cry: Sotsu. Her twenty-second single "Inochi no Tomoshibi" was released on November 5, 2021; the title song was used as the opening theme of the anime series Deep Insanity: The Lost Child.

Suzuki released her album Ultra Flash on May 25, 2022; it includes the song "Proud Stars" which was used as the ending theme to the anime series Shin Ikki Tousen. She and Kashitarō Itō also performed the song "Melodic Road Movie" which was used as the theme song to the anime film Isekai Quartet: The Movie – Another World. Later that year, she announced that she would be leaving Digital Double and forming her own personal management office. She released the single "Love? Reason why!!" on October 26, 2022; the title track is used as the opening theme to the anime series Love Flops, while the coupling song "Secret Code" was later used as the ending theme to the anime series Spy Classroom. Her twentieth-fourth single, "Ganbare to Sakebu tabi" (頑張れと叫ぶたび), was released on October 25, 2023, which was used as the ending theme to the anime series Bullbuster.

== Musical style and influences ==
In an interview with Anime News Network, Suzuki listed One Direction and Avril Lavigne as among her favorite Western artists, and considers the character Sheryl Nome (voiced by May'n) from Macross Frontier as her inspiration for entering the anison industry. She described how, although she was already determined to become a singer, the voice of Sheryl, which Suzuki describes as "really special, crystal clear, yet powerful enough", gave her chills and influenced her to perform music for anime. She described how excited she was performing in front of crowds shortly after her debut. She describes the song "Love Is My Rail" as the song which encouraged her to continue pursuing her dream of being a singer.

In an interview with Real Sound, Suzuki related her experiences working on her single "Redo". She describes the title song as difficult but fun and exciting to sing live. Having watched Re:Zero, she thought about the series' world view and the character Subaru, and sang the song to fit that worldview. She wanted to put "50% of the anime's worldview" and "50% her own feelings" into the song. She describes the single's coupling song "Moebius" as stemming from a policy where she was not to lie to anyone, and how she reflected on that four years after her debut. She mentioned how the song represents that she wants to establish a relationship of trust with her fans. In an interview with Eplus, she mentions that the name of her 20th birthday live, "Cheers", is meant to convey a message of "thank you" to the people who had supported her career up to that point.

In an interview with Diga Online, Suzuki described the production of her album Lead and single "Blow Out". She described how difficult life was as a high school student while she was focusing on her music career. Following her graduation from high school and entering university, she felt that she had made many sacrifices for her career. The title of the album came from the idea that she had become a new person after her concert during her 20th birthday, as she wanted to "lead everyone" through her songs. The song "My Shining Ray" was written to represent a big star that would lead people; she also described her experience singing the song as feeling like she was spreading wings. While singing the song "Redo" for Re:Zero, she considered it fun to sing as it "was completely different from herself". She describes "Blow Out" as a song about blowing away negative feelings.

In her Anime NYC 2018 interview with Arama! Japan, Suzuki stated that as she grows older, "I'm able to express my feelings more freely and show my true self without holding back. I've always had fun performing live, but the ability to fully be myself on stage has allowed me to enjoy my live shows even more."

== Voice roles ==
=== Anime ===
- Lost Song as Rin

== Discography ==
=== Albums ===
==== Studio albums ====
Title	Details	Peak chart positions		Sales
Title	Details	JPN	JPN Hot	Sales
17	Released: February 26, 2014; Label: Kadokawa Media Factory; Formats: CD, digital download, streaming; Track listing: 1. "DAYS of DASH"; 2. "Yume no Tsuzuki (夢の続き)"; 3. "CHOIR JAIL"; 4. "Watashi ga Motenai no wa Dou Kangaete mo Omaera ga Warui (私がモテないのはどう考えてもお前らが悪い)"; 5. "Unmei no Engagement (運命のEngagement)"; 6. "AVENGE WORLD(Album ver.)" 7. "Shuujin -Paradox 2013- (囚人 -Paradox 2013-)"; 8. "Sekai wa Kizu wo Dakishimeru(Album ver.) (世界は疵を抱きしめる(Album ver.))" 9. "Anata ni (あなたに)"; 10. "Yakusoku no Tsuzuki (約束の続き)"; 11. "Tears BREAKER(Album ver.)" 12. "Tsuioku no Kuroki ma Kenshi(Album ver.) (追憶の黒き魔剣士(Album ver.))" 13. "I say "Happy day!" 14. "Open Heart"; 15. "DAYS of DASH (Pf Ver.)"	34	—N/a	JPN: 3,351
18 -Colorful Gift-	Released: March 4, 2015; Label: Kadokawa Media Factory; Formats: CD, digital download, streaming; Track listing: 1. "Absolute Soul(ALBUM Ver.)"; 2. "This game" 3. "Ginsen no Kaze (銀閃の風)"; 4. "Omoi Yari (思い遣り)"; 5. "NOT PYGMALION"; 6. "Tomorrow's best" 7. "Fly to the stars 2015"; 8. "Fragile na Kimi (フラジャイルな君)"; 9. "LLL:CONNECTION"; 10. "Watashi ga Oba-san ni Natte mo (私がオバさんになっても)"; 11. "Ibelieve"; 12. "Sotsugyou Shashin (卒業写真)"; 13. "Suzuki Konomi AniSummer 10thSP Medley (Studio REC Ver.) (BONUS TRACK!!) (鈴木このみアニサマ10thSPメドレー(Studio REC Ver.)"	32	—N/a	JPN: 3,517
Lead	Released: March 8, 2017; Label: Kadokawa; Formats: CD, digital download, streaming; Track listing: 1. "Love is MY RAIL"; 2. "Watashi" wo Kureta Minna e (「わたし」をくれたみんなへ)"; 3. "yell! ~Kuchibiru Kara Hajimaru Mahou~ (yell! ～くちびるから始まる魔法～)"; 4. "one day sky" 5. "Tears BREAKER with piano(instrumental)" 6. "MY SHINING RAY"; 7. "BE THE ONE"; 8. "Absolute Soul"; 9. "Higashi no Sindbad (東のシンドバッド)"; 10. "Beat your Heart"; 11. "Redo"; 12. "Moment"; 13. "Zenbu Kimi ga Ita Kara Shittanda (全部君がいたから知ったんだ)"	31	50	JPN: 2,595
Shake Up!	Released: November 6, 2019; Label: Mages.; Formats: CD, digital download, streaming; Track listing: 1. "Shiawase Spice (シアワセスパイス)"; 2. "Sparking light" 3. "Humming Flight!"; 4. "Shinri no Kagami, Tsurugi no Youni (真理の鏡、剣乃ように)"; 5. "ANOTHER REAL"; 6. "ALKATALE ( アルカテイル)"; 7. "p.u.p.a." 8. "Relight"; 9. "MOTHER"; 10. "Utaeba Soko ni Kimi ga Iru Kara (歌えばそこに君がいるから)"; 11. "My Days"; 12. "Ao no Kanata (蒼の彼方)"; 13. "Anata ga Waraeba (あなたが笑えば)"	42	49	JPN: 1,671
Ultra Flash	Released: May 25, 2022; Label: Kadokawa; Formats: CD, digital download, streaming; Track listing: 1. "Bursty Greedy Spider"; 2. "ULTRA FLASH"; 3. "Damage Shoudeshita (ダメージ小でした)"; 4. "Missing Promise"; 5. "Glorious Day"; 6. "HELLO"; 7. "PROUD STARS"; 8. "Maioritekita Yuki (舞い降りてきた雪)"; 9. "Theater of Life"; 10. "Inochi no Tomoshibi (命の灯火)"; 11. "Realize"; 12. "Melodic Road Movie - featuring Kashitaro Ito (メロディックロードムービー featuring 伊東歌詞太郎)"; 13. "Ordinary Wish"	50	58	JPN: 932

==== Extended plays ====
Title	Details	Peak chart positions	Sales
Title	Details	JPN	Sales
18-More-	Released: October 16, 2015; Label: Kadokawa Media Factory; Formats: CD, digital download, streaming; Track listing: 1. "Before too long" 2. "Nice to Me CHU!!!"; 3. "Tomorrow’s best (Remix.ver)"; 4. "Suzuki Konomi AniSummer 11thSP Medley (鈴木このみアニサマ11thSPメドレー) (Studio Rec ver.)/Ginsen no Kaze (銀閃の風)～CHOIR JAIL～Absolute Soul)"; 5. "Ma Seiki no Metamorphosis (真聖輝のメタモルフォシス)"; 6. "Ma Seiki no Metamorphosis (真聖輝のメタモルフォシス) (duet.ver)" 7. "Hikari no Metamorphosis"; 8. "Before too long (instrumental)" 9. "Nice to Me CHU!!! (instrumental)" 10. "Ma Seiki no Metamorphosis (真聖輝のメタモルフォシス) (instrumental)"	48	JPN: 1,188

==== Compilation albums ====
Title	Details	Peak chart positions	
Title	Details	JPN	JPN Hot
Life of Dash	Released: December 20, 2017; Label: Kadokawa; Formats: CD, digital download, streaming; Track listing: 1. "CHOR JAIL"; 2. "DAYS of DASH"; 3. "Yume no Tsuzuki (夢の続き)"; 4. "Watashi ga Motenai no wa Dou Kangaete mo Omaera ga Warui (私がモテないのはどう考えてもお前らが悪い)"; 5. "AVENGE WORLD"; 6. "Sekai wa Kizu wo Dakishimeru (世界は疵を抱きしめる)"; 7. "This game" 8. "Ginsen no Kaze (銀閃の風)"; 9. "Absolute Soul"; 10. "Beat your Heart"; 11. "Redo"; 12. "Love is MY RAIL -running start-" 13. "Chaos Syndrome (カオスシンドローム)"; 14. "Blow Out"; 15. "THERE IS A REASON"; 16. "Yume e Tsunagu Ima (夢へ繋ぐ今)"	45	64

=== Singles ===
Title	Year	Peak chart positions		Sales	Album
Title	Year	JPN	JPN Hot	Sales	Album
"Choir Jail"	2012	34	—		17
"Days of Dash"	2012	28	68		17
"Yume no Tsuzuki" (夢の続き)	2013	34	—		17
"Watashi ga Motenai no wa dō Kangaetemo Omaera ga Warui!/Tears Breaker" (私がモテないのはどう考えてもお前らが悪い!/TEARS BREAKER) (with Kiba of Akiba)	2013	23	—		17
"Avenge World/Sekai wa Kizu o Dakishimeru" (AVENGE WORLD／世界は疵を抱きしめる)	2013	47	—		17
"This Game"	2014	13	9		18 -Colorful Gift-
"Ginsen no Kaze" (銀閃の風)	2014	31	32	JPN: 4,917	18 -Colorful Gift-
"Absolute Soul"	2015	25	26	JPN: 4,313	18 -Colorful Gift-
"Beat your Heart"	2016	38	67		Lead
"Redo"	2016	21	29	JPN: 3,351	Lead
"Love is My Rail"	2016	52	—		Lead
"Chaos Syndrome" (カオスシンドローム)	2017	58	98		Life of Dash
"Blow Out"	2017	28	19	JPN: 3,109	Life of Dash
"Utaeba Soko ni Kimi ga Iru Kara" (歌えばそこに君がいるから, If I Sing, You Will Be There)	2018	41	—		Shake Up!
"Ao no Kanata" (蒼の彼方, Beyond the Blue)	2018	68	—		Shake Up!
"Shinri no Kagami, Tsurugi no Yō ni" (真理の鏡、剣乃ように, Mirror of Truth, Like a Sword)	2019	36	— (Note: "Shinri no Kagami, Tsurugi no Yō ni" did not enter the Japan Hot 100 but peaked at number 70 on Download Songs chart.)		Shake Up!
"Theater of Life"	2020	30	—	JPN: 800	Ultra Flash
"Realize"	2020	38	86	JPN: 1,908	Ultra Flash
"Maioritekita Yuki - featuring Konomi Suzuki" (舞い降りてきた雪 featuring Konomi Suzuki, The falling snow)	2020	92	—		Ultra Flash
"Bursty Greedy Spider"	2021	15	— (Note: "Bursty Greedy Spider" did not enter the Japan Hot 100 but peaked at number 8 on Download Songs chart.)	JPN: 986	Ultra Flash
"Missing Promise"	2021	34	— (Note: "Missing Promise" did not enter the Japan Hot 100 but peaked at number 48 on Download Songs chart.)	JPN: 1,437	Ultra Flash
"Inochi no Tomoshibi" (命の灯火, Light of Life)	2021	71	— (Note: "Inochi no Tomoshibi" did not enter the Japan Hot 100 but peaked at number 44 on Download Songs chart.)		Ultra Flash
"Love? Reason Why!!"	2022	99	— (Note: "Love? Reason Why!!" did not enter the Japan Hot 100 but peaked at number 72 on Download Songs chart.)		Non-album singles
"Ganbare to Sakebu Tabi" (頑張れと叫ぶたび, Tearful Shout)	2023	—	—		Non-album singles
"—" denotes a recording that did not chart.

==== Digital singles ====
Title	Year	Peak chart positions		Sales (digital)	Album
Title	Year	JPN Dig.	JPN DL	Sales (digital)	Album
"Hanakabuki" (花傾奇)	2022	—	—		Non-album single
"Glorious Day"	2022	—	—		Ultra Flash
"Hakka" (白花)	2024	—	—		Non-album singles
"Hakka" (白花) (English ver.)	2024	—	—		Non-album singles
"Resurrection"	2024	—	—		Non-album singles
"Reweave"	2024	26	26	JPN: 7,053	Non-album singles
"Reweave (English Version)"	2024	—	—		Non-album singles
"Kimi-iro, Boku-iro" (君色、僕色, Your color, my color) (with Kashitaro Ito)	2025	—	—		Non-album singles
"Garando"	2026	—	—		Non-album singles
"Recollect" (feat. Ashnikko)	2026	17	17	JPN: 6,813	Non-album singles
"Tsuyoki Max Sengen" (強気MAX宣言, Max Mettle Mode)	2026	—	—		Non-album singles
"—" denotes a recording that did not chart.

==== Collaboration singles ====
Title	Year	Peak chart positions	Album
Title	Year	JPN	Album
"Never-End Tale" (with Tatsuyuki Kobayashi)	2015	108	Non-album singles
"Now or Never!" (as Konomi Suzuki from The Ultra League)	2022	54	Non-album singles
"E Hanano Keiji~ougon No Ichigeki" (e花の慶次～黄金の一撃) (with OxT)	2025	—	Non-album singles
"Kimi-iro, Boku-iro Quartet" (君色、僕色 Quartet, Your color, my color Quartet) (with Kashitaro Ito, Yusuke Kobayashi, Azki)	2025	—	Non-album singles
"Saikyo Mirai Shodo" (最強未来衝動) (with Azki)	2026	—	Non-album singles

==== As guest singer ====
Title	Year	Album
"Tsuioku no Kuroki Makenshi" (追憶の黒き魔剣士)	2012	THE BEST OF DRAGON GUARDIAN SAGA by Dragon Guardian
"Zankyou FANATIC BRAVE HEART" (残響FANATIC BRAVE HEART)	2016	"Hoko to Tate" (矛と盾) by Fly or Die
"Hoshi no Na ha Zetsubou" (星の名は絶望)	2016	Q-MHz by Q-MHz
""Gomen ne" no Cinderella" (「ごめんね」のシンデレラ)	2016	Q-MHz by Q-MHz
"Alkatale"	2018	Summer Pockets OP 'ALKATALE' by Konomi Suzuki & VisualArts / Key
"aNubis"	2019	”ROBOTICS;NOTES DaSH” Original Soundtrack by Takeshi Abo
"Asterlore"	2020	Summer Pockets REFLECTION BLUE OP 'ASTERLORE' by Konomi Suzuki, Shiroha Naruse (CV. Konomi Kohara) & VISUAL ARTS/Key
"Aoi Bara" (青い薔薇)	2021	bouquet by toku
"Champion Girl"	2022	-Season.1- The Lights by Den-On-Bu
