= Rem (Re:Zero) =

Fictional character in the Re:Zero series

- Re:Zero character
- Rem as seen in promotional artwork for Illusion Connect
- First appearance: "The Road to Redemption Begins"; February 25, 2014
- Created by: Tappei Nagatsuki
- Voiced by: Inori Minase (Japanese); Brianna Knickerbocker (English)

In-universe information
- Alias: "Remu-Rin" (by Subaru)
- Species: Oni
- Gender: Female
- Occupation: Maid
- Relatives: Quark (father); Temae (mother); Ram (sister)
- Nationality: Kingdom of Lugnica

Rem (Japanese: レム, Hepburn: Remu) is a fictional character from the fantasy light novel and anime series Re:Zero, created by Tappei Nagatsuki. She is voiced by Inori Minase in Japanese and by Brianna Knickerbocker in the English dub. She first appeared within Volume 2 of the light novel, "The Road to Redemption Begins" in 2014 and made her anime debut in the episode "The Happy Roswaal Mansion Family", the fourth episode of the anime, in April 2016.

Rem is the younger sister of Ram and works as a maid for Roswaal L. Mathers and is a supporter of Emilia's faction. She initially and mistakenly accused Subaru of being a member of the Witch's Cult due to having the Witch's Scent which results in her killing him two times. However, after he managed to save her at the Elior Forest, she becomes infatuated with him, deeming Subaru as her "hero". Despite Subaru turning her proposal down, she remains to be one of his closest allies throughout the earlier chapters.

Rem was ranked as the most popular female character in a poll conducted in 2016 and has become a fan-favorite within the anime, being consistently ranked in the Top 3 in popularity polls. She has also won the "Best Girl" category during the 1st Crunchyroll Anime Awards and had an official special event dedicated to her and Ram.

== Characteristics ==
Rem is a young girl with water-blue hair and water-blue pupils and has a similar appearance with her sister Ram. Her right eye is covered with bangs and only her left eye is exposed, which is the opposite to Ram. In their original designs, Rem and Ram weren't as distinctive and had longer, more traditional maid uniforms. Her name derives from the English word "Left" as it's pronounced similarly to the Katakana letter レ (Re). When it came time for the translation of the anime, her name was transliterated to "Rem". During the anime, Subaru nicknamed her "Remu-Rin".

At the beginning of the story, Rem is described as a 17-year-old girl, the younger sister of the twin maids and works at Roswaal L. Mathers' mansion. Her birthday is on February 2 and is 5 feet and a half tall. Rem's race is later revealed to be a demi-human as she's partly an Oni. The Oni in Re:Zero are described as adorning a pair of horns on their heads, but because Rem is twins with Ram, they were born with only one horn. Although they are twin sisters, Rem, unlike Ram who was described as a prodigy, doesn't have much personal skills to herself. Due to the gap in ability between the sisters, Rem had been under a lot of mental pressure since her childhood and gained an inferiority complex towards her sister.

When Ram lost her horn because of the Witch's Cult attacking their tribe, she felt the joy of being relieved from the pressure of long-term inferiority but also felt guilt. As a result, she forced himself to replicate what Ram did and tried her best to imitate the "life that her sister should have", and her loyalty to Roswaal was only based on "being able to protect her sister". Rem has also shown to take a personal interest in opera and poetry books. Her magical attributes are primarily in water but also can also use healing magic and fire magic for attacking. When participating in active combat, she wields a meteor hammer and can transform into her Oni form but can be prone to confusion at times.

== Character biography ==
Rem first appeared in Volume 2 of the light novel titled "The Road to Redemption Begins". In the Volume, she mistakenly believes that because of the Witch's Scent being detected on Subaru's body and due to being hostile towards the Cult, kills him twice. This changed after Emilia stated that Subaru was a good guy in a slightly coercive tone and warned Rem not to kill Subaru. When she saw that Subaru persisted in saving the villagers despite his lack of ability, she let go of her hostility and regretted and blamed herself for hesitating to save Subaru, which led to Subaru being cursed. Deeming that she must atone for her sins, he entered the Elior Forest alone but was saved by Subaru from the mabeasts and fell in love with him.

In the third chapter, after the end of the royal election, Rem stayed with Subaru at the mansion in the royal capital of Coursius. After a few days, she found out that there was a change in the mansion through mutual empathy with Ram, and tried to return with Subaru but was killed in every scenario that she attempted to do so. After her fourth death, Subaru, who gave up on trying to escape and feeling distraught upon seeing her corpse, becomes catatonic after his revival from freezing to death but thanks to Rem's encouragement, manages to pull through and participates in the White Whale Crusade. In the extra "What If?" scenario of Arc 3, after Subaru revives from his fourth death, he successfully manages to runs away with Rem. In the scenario, she imitates Emilia with her longer hair, marries Subaru and proceed to raise two children together.

At the end of Chapter 3, after an intense fight with the White Whale, Rem becomes seriously injured and weakened but while resting, becomes a victim of the Archbishop of Greed, Regulus Corneus and the Archbishop of Gluttony, Lye Batenkaitos after they ambushed Emilia and Crusch. This causes Rem to go into a state of coma and nobody but Subaru remembering her existence at all.

In Chapter 3, Subaru eloped, thinking that Rem would forgive his laziness and inaction, but Rem sternly refused to allow him to fall by himself. This trait propels Subaru even after Rem falls to a coma. In Chapter 4, Subaru uses this to recognize that an imitation of Rem, who was pretending to be Carmilla, was a fake during the Second Trial.

In Chapter 6, Rem was taken by Subaru to the watchtower. She got separated from Subaru for some reason halfway, and finally arrived at the watchtower and was taken care of by Ram. She currently resides in the "Green House" on the fourth floor of the watchtower.

=== Role in the web novel ===
In Chapter 6, Chapter 90 of the web novel, with Subaru and the Bishop of Gluttony, Lui Arnep, were swallowed by Satella at the Tower of the Sages and in Chapter 7 of the Web Novel of the first volume, it was confirmed that she was teleported to the Flakia Empire and at one point, woke up but suffered from memory loss. Feeling guilty, Subaru began denying that he was a hero due to his failure of saving Rem and losing a valuable ally.

== In other media ==
Rem has her own personal theme titled "Wishing". The song was written and composed by Heart's Cry and was played in Episode 18 of the anime. Rem has also made appearances in several Re:Zero video games, usually having a role similar to her anime appearance.

== Reception and popularity ==
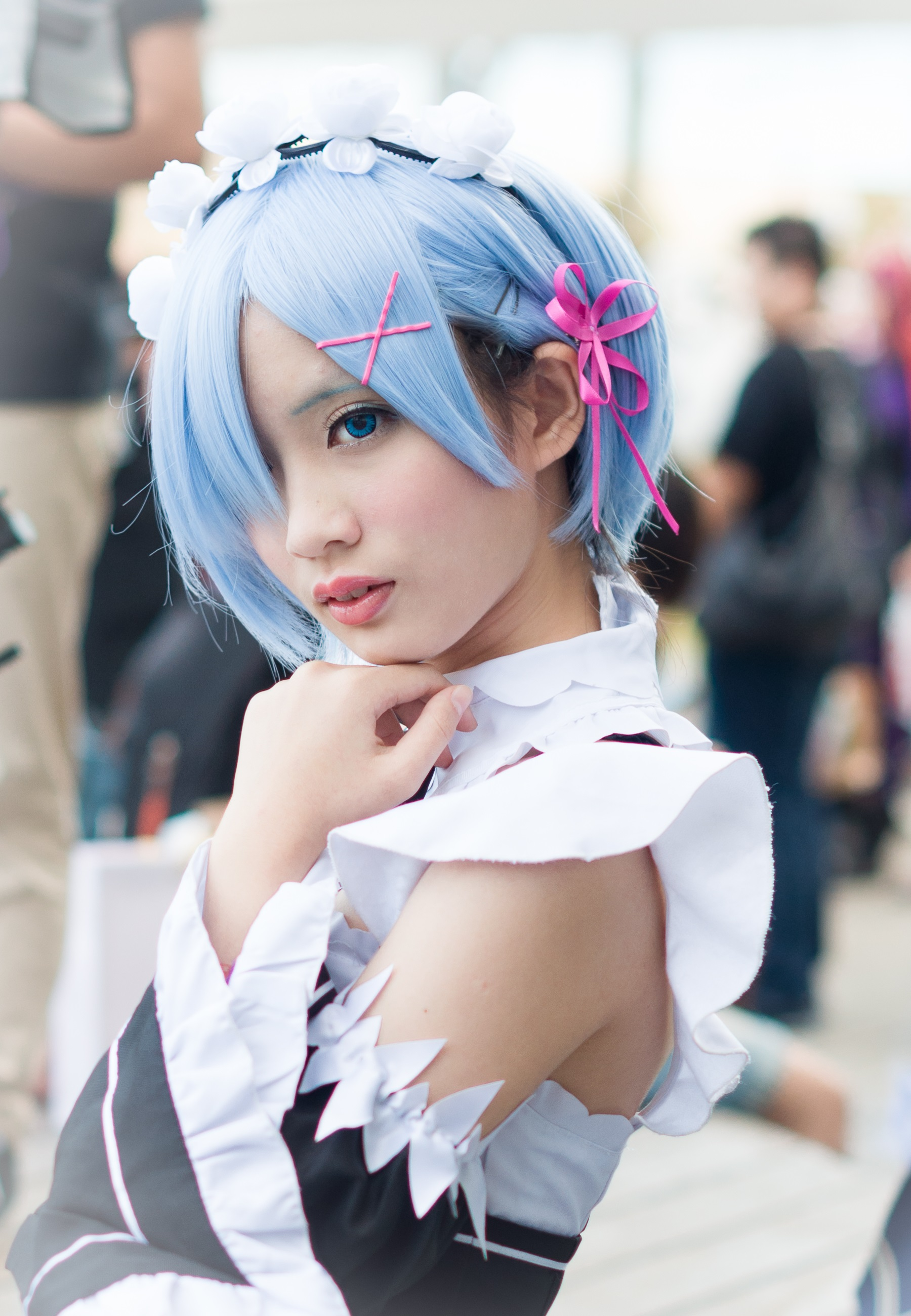
A cosplay of Rem on November 6, 2016.

Rem has gone on to become a fan favorite as the series went on. After her debut in the anime, she was praised for her role in the story and received consistently high rankings in popularity polls. In a poll conducted in 2017, she managed to outrank the series' main heroine, Emilia despite being a supporting character.

Rem is highly regarded in multiple polls and awards. In the character selection of the 2015–2016 Innovative Animation Awards held by Kadokawa Corporation, Rem won first place. She ranked sixth place in "The Most Attractive Female Character" held by Charapedia in Japan and the first place in the comprehensive selection. In the 2017 annual Kono Light Novel ga Sugoi!, she won second place and eighth place in the 2018 awards. In the "2016 Anime Popularity Awards" hosted by Chinese video service Bilibili, Rem was ranked first in the female characters category. In Newtype's monthly character survey, she also has a fairly high rating, ranking eighth in August, in the top five in September, and ranked first on October. On November and December however, her ranking declined to the third and seventh places. Her most notable award was ranking first place at the Best Girl category of the 1st Crunchyroll Anime Awards. Rem was also one of the five recipients for the "Best Girls of the Decade" category at the Funimation's Decade of Anime fan poll. She has also gained the highest number of votes in Otamart's poll for the most popular two-dimensional character.

=== Cultural impact ===
Due to the high popularity of Rem, a special event commemorating the official birthdays of Ram and Rem would take place but controversy would rise over the event not containing as many exhibition items for Ram. Later, the official prepared Ram's related exhibition items. However, the peripheral products related to other works still mostly featured Rem.

Rem has also had an impact on popular culture, such as "Dou Ni Rem", because its pronunciation is similar to the Cantonese profanity 屌你老母 ("Throw Your Old Mother"). However, contrary to popular belief, there was not a scene where Rem is thrown out. There was also a phenomenon where fans of the character were often described as the "Rem Cult", which caused controversy within the Re:Zero community.

Rem also played a major role during the eighteenth episode of the anime to the point where she was referred as the true heroine of the series. In Bahamut Animation Crazy, the number of bullet screens in the episode were the highest in history with the total number of bullet screens ranking in the top three and the number of views ranking first.

Rem has also gained some notability within Taiwan's fitness and fighting circles when internet celebrity and entrepreneur Holger Chen, once publicly stated "I like Rem" and was a major critic of Emilia's character, causing controversy.

=== Merchandise ===
Hug pillows of Rem were initially delayed due to the unprecedented levels of high fan demand. A officially licensed life-sized figure of the character has also been released. In 2017, Japanese manufacturer Good Smile Company released figures of Rem in their Nendoroid and Figma lines. Plushies were also released by some manufacturers.
