= Sean Chiplock =

American voice actor (born 1990)

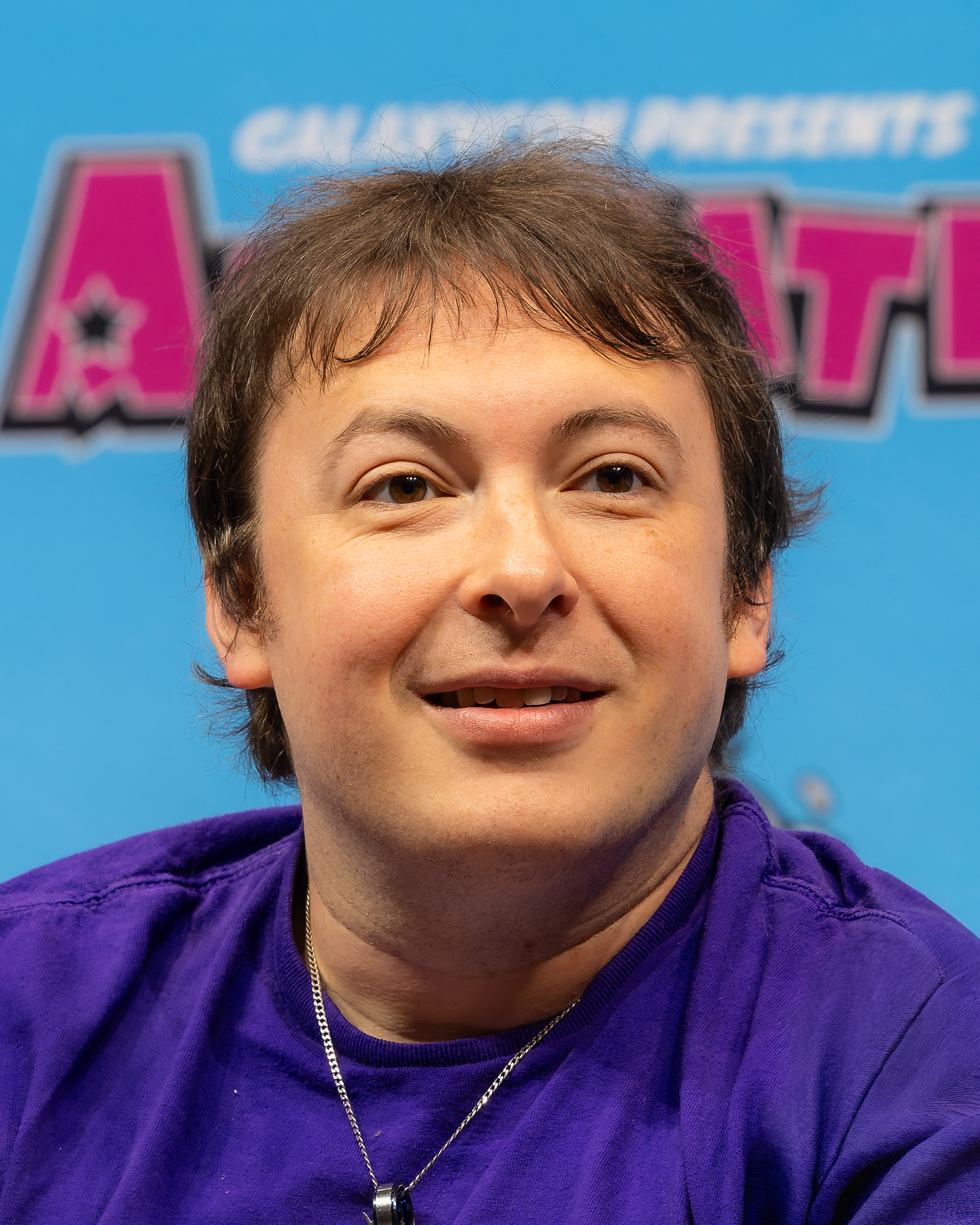
- Chiplock in 2026
- Born: Sean Edward Chiplock; June 21, 1990 (age 36); Kalamazoo, Michigan, U.S.
- Education: Western Michigan University (BA)
- Occupation: Voice actor
- Years active: 2012–present

Sean Edward Chiplock (born June 21, 1990) is an American voice actor who is known for his work in English versions of Japanese video games and anime, as well as in numerous indie games. Based in Los Angeles, California, Chiplock is known as the voice of Rean Schwarzer in the Trails series, Revali in The Legend of Zelda: Breath of the Wild, Kiyotaka Ishimaru in Danganronpa: Trigger Happy Havoc, Monotaro in Danganronpa V3: Killing Harmony, Yuuki Mishima in Persona 5, Diluc in Genshin Impact, Shiki Granbell in Edens Zero, Subaru Natsuki in Re:Zero, Guido Mista and Sex Pistols in JoJo's Bizarre Adventure: Golden Wind, Spider-Man in Marvel's Avengers, Pewter in AI: The Somnium Files, Noob Saibot in Mortal Kombat 11, and Kinger in The Amazing Digital Circus.

== Early life ==
Sean Edward Chiplock was born on June 21, 1990, in Kalamazoo, Michigan, United States, the oldest of two sons to Deneane (née Crawley) and Jerome Chiplock. He was raised in Saginaw, Michigan. Chiplock has a family history of ALS, including his mother, his grandmother, and his great-aunt; his mother died when he was 14.

== Filmography ==
=== Anime ===
Year	Title	Role	Notes	Source
2013	Accel World	Yuya Kamioka, Sugeno		
2013	Sword Art Online	Diabel		
2013	Magi: The Labyrinth of Magic	Cassim		
2014	Coppelion	Ibuse		
2014	Toradora!	Kuroma	2008 series	
2016	Hunter x Hunter	Riehlvelt	2011 series	
2016	Mobile Suit Gundam: Iron-Blooded Orphans	Dante Mogro		
2016	One Punch Man	Eyelashes		
2016	Charlotte	Male students, Gameshow Host		
2018	JoJo's Bizarre Adventure: Diamond is Unbreakable	Toyohiro Kanedaichi		
2018	Hero Mask	Grimm	Netflix dub	
2018−21	Re:Zero − Starting Life in Another World	Subaru Natsuki		
2019	Gundam Build Divers	Karuna (reprised the role in Re:Rise), Patrick Colasour		
2019	Mob Psycho 100	Keiji Mogami		
2019	Isekai Quartet	Subaru Natsuki		
2019	Cells at Work!	Neutrophil 4989		
2019	JoJo's Bizarre Adventure: Golden Wind	Guido Mista, Sorbet		
2019	Demon Slayer: Kimetsu no Yaiba	Swamp Demon		
2020	Fate/Grand Order - Absolute Demonic Front: Babylonia	Sherlock Holmes		
2020	Dorohedoro	Shin		
2020	Persona 5: The Animation	Yuuki Mishima		
2020	The God of High School	Daewi Han		
2020	Noblesse	Frankenstein		
2021	Kuroko's Basketball	Kazunari Takao		
2021	Burn the Witch	Bruno Bangnyfe		
2021	Mr. Osomatsu	Choromatsu		
2021	High-Rise Invasion	Rukiya		
2021	Yashahime: Princess Half-Demon	Ginka		
2021	Godzilla Singular Point	Bearach "BB" Byrne		
2021	Beastars	Tao, Carl, Lycaon	Season 2	
2021	Vinland Saga	Torgrim	Netflix dub	
2021	Edens Zero	Shiki Granbell		
2021	2.43: Seiin High School Boys Volleyball Team	Keita Yanome		
2021−26	Tokyo Revengers	Ken "Draken" Ryuguji		
2022	Komi Can't Communicate	Shigeo Chiarai		
2022	Lycoris Recoil	Majima		
2022	Odd Taxi	Shun Imai		
2022	Fire in His Fingertips	Rei Hidaka		
2022	The Rising of the Shield Hero	Kyo Ethnina		
2022−present	Boruto: Naruto Next Generations	Metal Lee	Ep. 211 onwards, succeeding Billy Kametz	
2023	Bastard!! Heavy Metal, Dark Fantasy	Vai Staebe	Netflix dub	
2023	Gamera Rebirth	Douglas Ken Osborn ("Brody")	Netflix dub	
2023–present	Beyblade X	Number Zero		
2024–present	Mission: Yozakura Family	Kyoichiro Yozakura	Hulu dub	
2024–25	Blue Exorcist	Lewin Light		
2024	Mashle	Ryoh Grantz		
2025	Blue Box	Shoichiro Kishi, Yuki Tateyama, Oizumi	Netflix dub	
2025	Digimon Ghost Game	Kyoshiro Higashimitarai		
2025	Nukitashi the Animation	Hamedori		
2026	The Elusive Samurai	Yasuie Hōjō		

=== Animation ===
Year	Title	Role	Notes	Source
2012	The Bedfellows	Sheen, Fatigue		
2013	Totes Burgers	Jason	Short film	
2013	Journey to the Center of the Nerd	Chip		
2018	Treehouse Detectives	Ollie, Wayne		
2019	Screechers Wild	Revadactyl		
2020−21	The VeggieTales Show	Scallini, Scooter, Awful Alvin		
2021	Kayko and Kokosh	Kayko	English dub	
2021−24	Murder Drones	Thad, Ronathon, Sam, Mitchell		
2023	SMG4	One-Shot Wren	Movie: WESTERN SPAGHETTI"	
2023−26	The Amazing Digital Circus	Kinger, Coach Dictatorer		
2024	Dew Drop Diaries	Phoebe's Dad		
2024	The Adventures of Ben Born Again & Yellow Dog	Ben, Yellow Dog		
2024	Monkey Wrench	Kinger	Episode: "The Tape (April Fools 2024)"	
2025−26	Death Battle	Mahito, Superboy-Prime	2 episodes: "Shigaraki VS Mahito", "The Sentry VS Superboy-Prime"	
2025	MAU MAKAN APA?	Jaya Utomo	Episode 2 English Dub	

=== Film ===
Year	Title	Role	Notes	Source
2019	Detective Pikachu	Train PA System, Roundhouse Arena match result announcer		
2021	Violet Evergarden: The Movie	Additional Cast	English dub	
2022	Bubble	Denki Ninja Member A	English dub	
2023	Under the Boardwalk	Nigel		
2024	Revision After Revision	Sorbitol	Short film; English dub	
2025	Fixed	Ol' Spice		

=== Video games ===
Year	Title	Role	Notes	Source
2012	Loren the Amazon Princess	Amukiki		
2012	Dust: An Elysian Tail	Sanjin		
2012	Strike Force Heroes	All male voices		
2012	Earn to Die	Main character		
2013	Strike Force Heroes 2	Engineer, Mercenary, General, Sniper, Juggernaut		
2013	Heroes of Newerth	Sir Benzalot, Sir Terrowin		
2013	Ys: Memories of Celceta	Ozma, Leo, Gruda	English dub	
2013	Power Rangers Megaforce	Vrak, Dragonflay		
2013	Stick it to the Man!	Various		
2014	Earth Defense Force 2025	Male Victim C	English dub	
2014	Danganronpa: Trigger Happy Havoc	Kiyotaka Ishimaru	English dub	
2014	Children of Liberty	Doug Knight, William Dawes		
2014	Freedom Planet	Spade, Prince Dail		
2014	Fairy Fencer F	Zenke	English dub	
2014	Earn to Die 2	Main character		
2015	Pixelmon	Various Pixelmon	Minecraft mod	
2015	Killer Instinct	Rash		
2015	The Legend of Heroes: Trails of Cold Steel	Rean Schwarzer	English dub	
2015	Zombie Vikings	Various		
2016	The Legend of Heroes: Trails of Cold Steel II	Rean Schwarzer	English dub	
2016	Shin Megami Tensei IV: Apocalypse	Navarre	English dub	
2016	Alice VR	Alchemist	English dub	
2017	Seiyuu Danshi	Hikaru		
2017	Valentine Panic	Quinn		
2017	Bedfellows Frenzy	Sheen, Fatigue, additional voices		
2017	The Legend of Zelda: Breath of the Wild	Revali, Teba, Great Deku Tree	English dub	
2017	Zero Escape: The Nonary Games	Santa	English dub	
2017	Persona 5	Yuuki Mishima	English dub	
2017	Shiness: The Lightning Kingdom	Ayron, Nashoba, Reize, Villager		
2017	Fire Emblem Echoes: Shadows of Valentia	Halcyon, Blake, Wolff, Jerome	English dub	
2017	Valkyria Revolution	Isaak Berggreen	English dub	
2017	Akiba's Beat	Twiggy Slims, Belligerent Youth	English dub	
2017	Ys VIII: Lacrimosa of Dana	Hummel	English dub	
2017	Mary Skelter: Nightmares	Mamoru, Chiharu	English dub	
2017	Danganronpa V3: Killing Harmony	Monotaro, Kiyotaka Ishimaru	English dub	
2017	Tavern Brawl Tactics	Morphling, Bombardier, Vampire, Sir Shaqiri		
2017	Paladins	Oni Talus		
2017–2020	MapleStory	Cadena (male), Darius, Ancient Crystal (Ancient God), Moody Student, Cedric	English dub	
2017–2023	Smite	Rain Singer Vamana, Worldwalker Janus, Anubis King Jackal, Chiron Unicorn, Warchief Raijin, Heimdallr Vice, Dinosaur Slasher Cernunnos, Candy Shop Achilles, Blood Raven Horus, Ah Muzen Cab Lich Madness, Duke Hou Yi, Tabby Toil Ganesha		
2018	Hyper Universe	Cain, Migenhardt, Green Pitbull	English dub	
2018	Secret of Mana	Dyluck, Joch, Jehk, Sylphid	English dub	
2018	Mobius Final Fantasy	Bandits, Referees	English dub	
2018	Monster Retsuden Oreca Battle	Samurai Hien, Underworld Warden Yama, Zhu Bajie	English dub	
2018	Returners	Aladdin, Alexander, Xiehan Yu, Hong Qing-lin	English dub	
2018	Camp Buddy	Aiden Flynn		
2018	Identity V	Thief	English dub	
2018	God of War	Bandit, Hel-Walkers		
2018	Octopath Traveler	Darius, Werner	English dub	
2018	Flipping Death	Hocus, Santa, Whale, Dr. Rubert		
2018	MapleStory 2	Berserker (male), Rovey, Cheerful Merchant, Bigfoot Merchant, Oarsmen	English dub	
2018	Earn to Die 3	Main character		
2018	Hex Gambit	Salvador, Lolli, Dr. Superior		
2018	Grand Chase: Dimensional Chaser	Lulu, Corrupted Gaian	English dub	
2018	Command & Conquer: Rivals	Various		
2018	Vindictus	Grimden	English dub	
2019	Ace Combat 7: Skies Unknown	Quang, Halo 11	English dub	
2019	Wargroove	Valder, Greenfinger, Sedge		
2019	Chocobo's Mystery Dungeon Every Buddy!	Mayor Gale	English dub	
2019	Zanki Zero: Last Beginning	Zen Kubota, Creature of Wrath, Male Creature	English dub	
2019	Mr Love: Queen's Choice	Kiro	English dub	
2019	Ghost Giant	Monsieur Toux		
2019	Super Neptunia RPG	Various	English dub	
2019	Mortal Kombat 11	Noob Saibot, Kharon		
2019	Yokai Kitchen	Pegasus Ryker	English dub	
2019	KurtzPel	Male Voice (ITP)	English dub	
2019	Pokémon Masters	Siebold, Nanu	English dub	
2019	Astral Chain	Additional voices	English dub	
2019	AI: The Somnium Files	Pewter	English dub	
2019	Dauntless	Janek Zai		
2019	The Legend of Heroes: Trails of Cold Steel III	Rean Schwarzer	English dub	
2019	Catherine: Full Body	Archangel	English dub	
2019	Winds of Change	Sovy, Pro, Mylus	English dub	
2019	Art of Conquest	Bazric	English dub	
2019–2024	Shadowverse	Belphomet, additional voices	English dub	
2020	GYEE	Chang, Eddie, Rald Schwarz	English dub	
2020	Persona 5 Royal	Yuuki Mishima	English dub	
2020	Final Fantasy VII Remake	Additional voices	English dub	
2020	The Last of Us Part II	Seraphites		
2020	Ghost of Tsushima	Additional voices		
2020	The Legend of Heroes: Trails of Cold Steel IV	Rean Schwarzer	English dub	
2020	Genshin Impact	Diluc Ragnvindr, Wagner, Cyrus, additional voices	English dub	
2020	Marvel's Spider-Man: Miles Morales	The Underground		
2020–2021	Hyrule Warriors: Age of Calamity	Revali, Teba, Great Deku Tree	English dub	
2021	Re:Zero − Starting Life in Another World: The Prophecy of the Throne	Subaru Natsuki	English dub	
2021	Fallen Legion: Revenants	Alestir, Marius, Obed Vinge, Nigel	English dub	
2021	Final Fantasy VII Remake Intergrade	Nero the Sable	English dub	
2021	Guilty Gear Strive	Ky Kiske	English dub	
2021	Indigo 7: Quest for Love	Guille, Grim Reaper		
2021	Cris Tales	Ardo		
2021	Shadowverse: Champion's Battle	Luca Yonazuki, Belphomet, Chrono Witch, Undead Outbreak, Bloodlust Demon, Reaper of Madness	English dub	
2021	Aliens: Fireteam Elite	Synth Soldier, Human Soldier, HQ Contact		
2021	Kraken Academy!!	Kraken, Headmaster, Jean		
2021	Lost Judgment	Matsui	English dub	
2021	New World	Adjudicator Hallock, Alchemist Santos, Watcher Reynolds		
2021	Demon Slayer: Kimetsu no Yaiba – The Hinokami Chronicles	Swamp Demon	English dub	
2021	Mary Skelter Finale	Mamoru, Chiharu	English dub	
2021	Demon Turf	Demon King		
2021	Marvel's Avengers	Spider-Man		
2021	Halo Infinite	Additional voices		
2021, 2026	Cookie Run: Kingdom	Purple Yam Cookie, Sugar Gnome, Kinger Cookie	English dub	
2022	Lost Ark	Additional voices	English dub	
2022	Horizon Forbidden West	Additional voices		
2022	Chocobo GP	Camilla's Pa	English dub	
2022	Relayer	Additional voices	English dub	
2022	Corpse Factory	Shinya		
2022	Garena Free Fire	Kenta	English dub	
2022	Guardian Tales	Panda	English dub	
2022	Ragnarok M: New Start!	Additional voices	English dub	
2022	Azure Striker Gunvolt 3	Gunvolt	English dub	
2022	AI: The Somnium Files – Nirvana Initiative	Pewter	English dub	
2022	Camp Buddy: Scoutmasters' Season	Aiden Flynn		
2022	La Pucelle: Ragnarok	Yattanya, Barsom, additional voices	English dub	
2022	Freedom Planet 2	Spade, Prince Dail		
2022	Gods Unchained	Thaeriel		
2022	Star Ocean: The Divine Force	Gaston Gaucier	English dub	
2022	God of War Ragnarök	Berserker Stag		
2022	Tactics Ogre: Reborn	Beylevra, Ragnar, Hiram, Gannon, Bingham, Nathalork, Voltare, additional voices	English dub	
2022	Lunistice	Accel		
2022	Marvel's Midnight Suns	Additional voices		
2022	Crisis Core: Final Fantasy VII Reunion	Nero the Sable	English dub	
2023	Path of the Midnight Sun	Christoph		
2023	Octopath Traveler II	Pirro, additional voices	English dub	
2023	Advance Wars 1+2: Re-Boot Camp	Hachi	English dub	
2023	Afterimage	Aqil, Brandr, Ferryman, Roke, Whitefeather		
2023	Black Desert Online	Taesoo, Bareeds III, additional voices	English dub	
2023	Final Fantasy Brave Exvius	Gigot	English dub	
2023	Ragnarok X: Next Generation	Israel, Tatanka, Thought Manifestation	English dub	
2023	The Tale of Food	Cured Meat, Yipin Pot, Longjing Shrimp	English dub	
2023	Cassette Beasts	Zedd, Lodestein, additional voices		
2023	The Legend of Zelda: Tears of the Kingdom	Teba, Sage of Wind, Great Deku Tree	English dub	
2023	Street Fighter 6	Additional voices	English dub	
2023	Master Detective Archives: Rain Code	Fink the Slaughter Artist	English dub	
2023	Diablo IV	Locran	English dub	
2023	Eternal Return	Alex	English dub	
2023	MapleStory M	Isaac, Veda, Algol	English dub	
2023	Komorebi	Isaac		
2023	The Legend of Heroes: Trails into Reverie	Rean Schwarzer	English dub	
2023	Starfield	Clay Dietrich, Noam, Toby		
2023	Anonymous;Code	Davide Iesue	English dub	
2023	Cards and Castles 2	Sarus, Lionel		
2023	Strike Force Heroes	Riggs, Toad, Bull, Jenkins, Scientist, various		
2023	Astral Ascent	Ikki	English dub	
2023	Persona 5 Tactica	Additional voices	English dub	
2023	Lego Fortnite	Additional voices		
2024	Granblue Fantasy Versus: Rising	Lucilius	English dub	
2024	Granblue Fantasy: Relink	Rolan, Lucilius	English dub	
2024	Persona 3 Reload	Mr. Ono, additional voices	English dub	
2024	Final Fantasy VII Rebirth	Nero the Sable	English dub	
2024	Duck Detective: The Secret Salami	Duck Detective		
2024	Earn to Die Rogue	Main character		
2024	The Elder Scrolls Online – Gold Road	The Indrik, Otho Florius, Belwelas		
2024	Gundam Breaker 4	Artal	English dub	
2024	Starstruck: Hands of Time	Zach		
2024	Romancing SaGa 2: Revenge of the Seven	Bokhohn	English dub	
2024	Card-en-Ciel	Gunvolt	English dub	
2024	Loco Motive	Arthur Ackerman		
2024	Ashe: Crystal Heart	Various	Skyrim mod	
2025	Lunar Remastered Collection	White Knight Leo	English dub	
2025	Fatal Fury: City of the Wolves	Salvatore Ganacci, Ken Ryuguji	English dub	
2025	Duck Detective: The Ghost of Glamping	Duck Detective		
2025	Dune: Awakening	The Vulture		
2025	No Sleep for Kaname Date – From AI: The Somnium Files	Pewter	English dub	
2025	Honkai: Star Rail	Zephyro	English dub	
2025	Bubsy in: The Purrfect Collection	Narrator		
2025	Borderlands 4	Additional voices		
2025	Sushi Ben	Gen, Kyo, Ryourin	English dub	
2025	Octopath Traveler 0	Alfyn	English dub	
2025	Shadowverse: Worlds Beyond	Doctor / Belphomet Ardelyte, Stray Beastman	English dub	
2026	The Legend of Heroes: Trails Beyond the Horizon	Rean Schwarzer	English dub	
2026	Monster Hunter Stories 3: Twisted Reflection	Murray, Glazer	English dub	
2026	Bubsy 4D	Bubsy		
2026	Marvel's Wolverine	Additional voices		
2026	Ace Combat 8: Wings of Theve	Additional voices	English dub	
TBA	Billie Bust Up	Scrimshaw		
TBA	Jock Studio	Ace Anderson		
TBA	Nekojishi: Lin & Partners	Lin Tian-Liao		
TBA	SML Movie: BLOODSHOT!	Makes Bad Decisions Guy		

=== Other media ===
Year	Title	Role	Medium	Notes
2025	The Adventures of the Fox in the Fedora	The Grand Commissioner	Audio drama	
2025	Crowd Control	Himself	Web series (Episode: "Tiny Celebrity")	
2025	Mau Makan Apa?	Jaya Utomo	English dub; web series (Episode: "The Last Place My Father Was Ever Seen")	
