= Subaru Natsuki =

Fictional character in Re:Zero created by Tappei Nagatsuki

- Re:Zero character
- Subaru Natsuki as illustrated by Shin'ichirō Ōtsuka
- First appearance: Prologue: "The Waste Heat of the Beginning" (2012)
- Created by: Tappei Nagatsuki
- Voiced by: Sean Chiplock (English); Yūsuke Kobayashi (Japanese)

In-universe information
- Nationality: Japanese

Subaru Natsuki (Japanese: 菜月 昴, Hepburn: Natsuki Subaru) is a fictional character from Re:Zero, a series of light novels written by Tappei Nagatsuki and illustrated by Shin'ichirō Ōtsuka. Subaru is a young hikikomori who suddenly finds himself transported to another world on his way home from the convenience store. While dealing with the new world's society, he also encounters catastrophes that result in his death, though he is always revived to a point in time where he can make substantial changes. Using this "Return by Death" (死に戻り, Shinimodori) ability, Subaru searches for a way to protect his newly found friends. Aside from the anime and video games based on the series, Subaru also appears in the gag series Isekai Quartet.

Named after the Pleiades asterism, Subaru was originally created by Nagatsuki in 2012 with the intention of creating a web novel. A publishing house editor was impressed and asked Nagatsuki to write light novels for publication. Ōtsuka's first sketch of the character was rejected due to the editor's fear of making him unlikable. In the anime adaptation of the series, Subaru is voiced by Yūsuke Kobayashi in Japanese and Sean Chiplock in English.

Subaru has been a popular character in Japan and won "Best Character (Male)" at the Newtype Anime Awards. Despite early mixed reception to Subaru's characterization, anime and manga critics have praised the handling of his stress and the way he overcomes it in a heroic manner, making him a likable protagonist. The character has been often analyzed as the opposite of the typical archetypes presented in the isekai genre due to Subaru's heroic complex and the weakness he often shows in most episodes.

== Creation and development ==
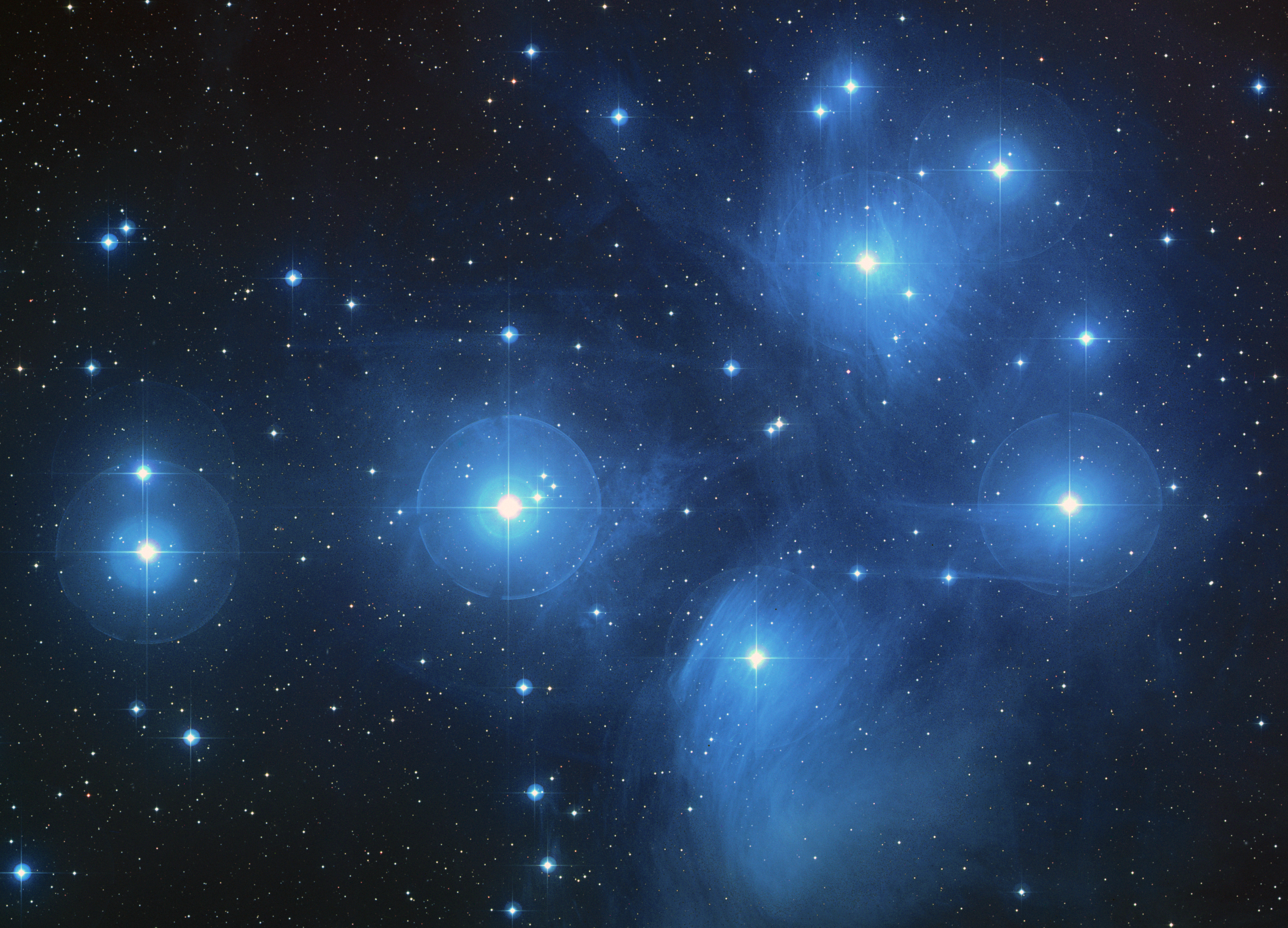
The Pleiades asterism which Subaru was named after.

The series' editor at MF Bunko J, Masahito Ikemoto, first became aware of Tappei Nagatsuki's web novel in April 2013 when it began to appear on his Twitter feed. He was immediately impressed by the series' use of Subaru's Return by Death, and how it was a "depressing, yet surprising, twist on the fantasy genre" before he began working with Nagatsuki to adapt the series into a light novel.

Subaru was created to be a young man assisting a silver-haired girl named Emilia. The character's first name was a reference to the Pleiades star cluster, known as "Subaru" in Japan, explained in-universe as chosen by his parents because their first date was in a planetarium. Nagatsuki conceived of Return by Death under the assumption that it would help the main character become stronger with each use before changing his mind. Instead, he decided to develop Subaru through the latter's deaths. Nagatsuki decided to explore Subaru's deaths in the light novel as he found this concept to be rarely explored in other series. In order to keep the narrative entertaining, Nagatsuki gives Subaru a challenge with every Return by Death and subjects him to gruesome experiences.

Early concept art for the characters Subaru and Emilia

Although Subaru dies multiple times, the scene where he is eaten by rabbits was the most gruesome to the novelist, who claimed nothing scarier would happen in the novels. The scene was based on the 1997 film The Lost World: Jurassic Park where Compsognathus dinosaurs devour the character of Dieter Stark. In particular, Nagatsuki said that he liked the fear the Jurassic Park franchise shows when showing small creatures able eat people. Despite the rabbits' scene being the scariest death for the author, he still tries to come up with surprises when killing Subaru in each arc of the novels. When Subaru becomes unable to use his Return by Death power and everybody around him becomes an enemy, the novelist found it difficult to write the story.

Illustrator Shin'ichirō Ōtsuka submitted to Ikemoto a number of character designs for the major characters. Subaru's initial design made him look like a delinquent, with Ōtsuka later describing it as "not the face of a boy in his teens". Ikemoto requested that the character be "more friendly and less fierce" so that the audience could empathize with him during emotional scenes. Given that Subaru was conceived as an ordinary teenager, Ōtsuka avoided giving him the stylishness of an ikemen.

After joining the project, Yoshiko Nakamura and scriptwriter Eiji Umehara had to readjust their views of the main character and rewrite scenes where they had made Subaru appear "cool". At Masaharu Watanabe's direction, Nakamura had to rewrite Subaru's telling of The Red Ogre Who Cried in episode 6 multiple times.

=== Voice actors ===
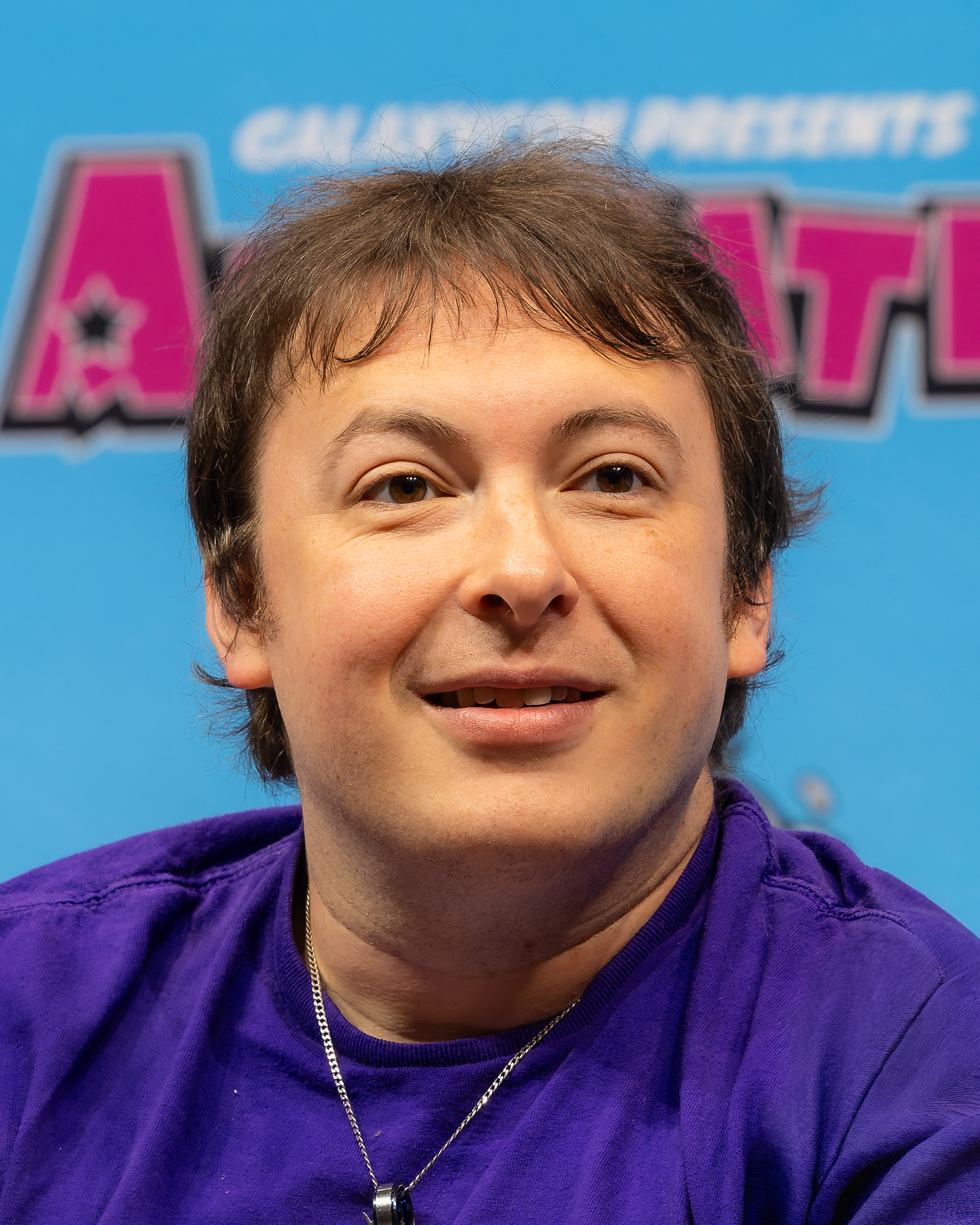
Sean Chiplock voices Subaru in English

Yūsuke Kobayashi voices Subaru in the Japanese version. He initially believed the series was a romantic comedy. However, upon reading more of the narrative, Kobayashi was attracted by the series. He describes Subaru as a character who tries his best to avoid a negative future thanks to his Return by Death ability. As a result, he views his character more as a cheerful teenager despite the threats the character faces. Kobayashi recalls being surprised as he was immediately cast for the role once the staff heard his voice. When Kobayashi was preparing, he said "Isn't this too many lines for an anime?!". However, based on the multiple moods he had to portray, he became exhausted during recording sessions. During initial episodes, Kobayashi befriended Puck's actor Yumi Uchiyama who supported him.

Kobayashi had difficulties voicing Subaru in the first season, as a result of being given little direction, but got Nagatsuki's approval, as he found his work appealing. The two lines "I hate myself" and "I love you, Emilia" were written to be the strongest lines in developing Subaru in the first season. With the second season, Kobayashi believes the way Otto supports Subaru is a major turning point for the main character, now that Rem was not available to assist Subaru. The actor said that there was a noticeable change between Subaru and Emilia's relationship as they became a couple; so their interactions are more straightforward and his transformation into a knight appealed to the actor.

Sean Chiplock voiced the character in the English dub of the series. Chiplock found Subaru as an energetic character with a sense of justice, comparing his personality with that of Jin-Mori, the protagonist of The God of High School. Chiplock claimed that he drew on his own personal insecurities to make Subaru sound properly scared, eventually forming Subaru's trauma.

== Appearances ==
=== Re:Zero − Starting Life in Another World ===
Subaru is the main protagonist of the series; he is a 17-year-old NEET who, on his way home from a convenience store, is suddenly transported to the Kingdom of Lugunica, a nation in another world. There, he meets and falls in love with a silver-haired half-elf girl named Emilia, leading to him getting recruited into her camp for the Royal Selection, a competition to decide the kingdom's next ruler, and meeting the other members: nobleman Roswaal, twin maids Ram and Rem, and the spirit of their mansion's library, Beatrice. Upon his arrival, Subaru also acquires an ability he dubs "Return by Death" that sends him back to a predetermined point in time whenever he dies, which was seemingly gifted to him by Satella, the Witch of Envy, who bears an uncanny resemblance to Emilia and haunts him throughout the narrative.

==== Arcs 1–3 ====
The first two arcs follow Subaru as he navigates his new environment and meets the other cast members, all whilst feeling isolated as the only person who remembers Return by Death's loops, since Satella silences him whenever he attempts to talk about it. After arriving in this new world, Subaru falls in love with Emilia at first sight after crossing paths with her, which unfortunately leads to them both being killed by an assassin targeting Emilia. Here, Subaru learns about Return by Death and decides to use the extra chances he's been given to save Emilia, only to fail continually. In the end, Subaru realizes he cannot save Emilia on his own and yells for help, prompting Reinhard van Astrea, the world's strongest knight, to appear and fight off the assassin.

Afterward, Emilia takes Subaru to Roswaal's manor, where he meets Roswaal, Ram, Rem, and Beatrice. However, unable to talk about himself or Return by Death because of Satella, the others soon grow suspicious of him. Meanwhile, Subaru becomes increasingly paranoid as he keeps dying, sometimes via a curse or other times when someone attacks him. After Rem is eventually revealed to be his attacker, Subaru completely isolates himself in his next loop and survives, only to then find that Rem died instead, and everyone is in mourning. Finally seeing those around him as actual people with flaws, Subaru resolves to save them in his next loop before committing suicide. In the end, the curse that has been killing Subaru and Rem is revealed to be from a monster pack preparing to attack a nearby village, and Subaru holds them off long enough for Roswaal to arrive and deal with them, earning Rem and the others' trust.

The third arc centers around Subaru's flaws: his entitlement and need for validation. When Emilia starts focusing on the Royal Selection over him, Subaru interrupts the proceedings before publicly declaring himself her knight, only to make a fool of himself and her. He also meets the knight of one of Emilia's rivals, Aldabran, or "Al", who is revealed to also be from Japan, shattering his perception that he is special. Subsequently, the manor comes under attack from the Witch's Cult, a group of zealots who worship Satella, led by the Sin Archbishop of Sloth, Petelgeuse Romanée-Conti, who serves as a foil to Subaru—a madman who feels entitled to the witch's affection. To fight off the Cult, Subaru attempts to recruit help from the other camps but is turned down during several loops due to his self-centered behavior, always resulting in his friends' deaths. Eventually reaching his breaking point, Subaru gives up and admits his faults to Rem, revealing that, beneath his eccentricities, he actually has a severe inferiority complex. However, rather than chastise him, Rem declares that he has been her "hero" ever since he saved her in the second arc, giving him a reason to keep going.

Acquiescing to those around him, rather than expecting them to conform to him, Subaru wins the other camps' support before defeating Petelgeuse using information he acquired during his previous failed loops. Unfortunately, the victory comes at a price: Rem is left in a comatose state after being attacked by another Sin Archbishop, Gluttony, with waking her becoming Subaru's secondary goal throughout the series.

==== Arc 4 ====
Seeking answers regarding the Witch's Cult, Subaru and his friends travel to a place known as "The Sanctuary", which houses the souls of deceased witches—Greed, Echidna; Sloth, Sekhmet; Pride, Typhon; Gluttony, Daphne; Wrath, Minerva; and Lust, Carmilla—and is surrounded by a magical barrier that can only be lifted by completing three trials: face your past, face your present, face your future. When Subaru accidentally takes the first trial, the origin of his inferiority complex is revealed: his father was well-respected in their community, and Subaru wanted to be like him but failed to live up to that image, subsequently going through a downward spiral that culminated in him becoming a hikikomori. Having effectively already overcome his hikikomori tendencies in previous arcs, Subaru easily passes the trial.

The arc's central conflict is introduced when a horde of monsters attacks Sanctuary while assassins raid the manor. Throughout the following loops, Subaru showcases extreme disregard for his own life, immediately attempting suicide so he can loop back when things do not go well and not wanting to burden others by attempting to do everything himself. This reveals that, although Subaru has overcome his hikikomori tendencies, the underlying mindset that made him one remains: the belief that his life has no worth. Subaru's mindset is mirrored in Beatrice and Roswaal. Beatrice, a centuries-old spirit, is tired of life and wants someone to euthanize her. Meanwhile, Roswaal has dedicated his life to one goal—reviving his master, Echidna—while disregarding everything else. Roswaal is also revealed to know about Return by Death, and he instigated these conflicts to mold Subaru; Subaru can save the Sanctuary or the manor, not both.

The turning point comes when Subaru accidentally enters the second trial, where he sees alternate presents in which others grieve for him after dying in his previous loops, ultimately failing the trial because he can't accept these realities. Afterward, Satella confronts him alongside the other witches, who tell him to care more for himself, which makes Subaru realize he has been disregarding his various lives. Acknowledging he cannot control everything, Subaru instead trusts his companions to figure things out on their own. After betting with Roswaal that he will save both Sanctuary and the manor in a single loop, Subaru helps Emilia overcome her self-esteem issues, allowing her to complete the trials. At the same time, by recruiting the merchant Otto, whom he befriended in Arc 3, and Sanctuary's guardian Garfiel, Subaru saves the manor's residents. Subaru also convinces Beatrice to live, and she becomes his contracted spirit.

Afterward, for his accomplishments in saving the Sanctuary and the manor's residents, Emilia officially knights Subaru.

==== Arc 5 ====
During the fifth arc of the novels (anime season three), one year after the fourth arc, Subaru and the rest of Emilia's camp are invited to a get-together with the other camps in the city of Priestella. Unfortunately, the city comes under attack by the remaining Sin Archbishops: Wrath, Sirius Romanée-Conti; Greed, Regulus Corneus; Lust, Capella Emerada Lugunica; and three Gluttonies, Lye Batenkaitos, Roy Alphard, and Rui Arneb. Emilia is kidnapped by Regulus after the latter falls in love with her, intending to marry her by force. In response, Subaru and the other camps form an alliance and succeed in driving out the Witch Cult, resulting in Regulus's death and Sirius's capture, though Capella and the Gluttony trio escape. Though Subaru has a comparably smaller role in this arc compared to previous ones, due to the narrative shifting focus to other characters, he still has several notable achievements: giving a motivational speech to Priestella's citizens and helping to defeat Regulus by deducing the mechanics of the latter's invulnerability power and how to disable it.

==== Arc 6 ====
In the sixth arc (anime season four), Subaru and his friends head toward the Pleiades Watchtower to meet the sage Shaula in hopes that she might cure the people affected by the Sin Archbishops' powers during the fifth arc. Unfortunately, Shaula cannot help them as she is revealed to be merely the apprentice of the actual missing sage, whom she mysteriously mistakes Subaru for; and they are stuck in the tower until they complete three exams. Worse, mid-way through the arc, Subaru inexplicably loses all his memories from his time in this world and becomes paranoid toward his friends as someone keeps killing him. However, with Emilia's help, the amnesiac Subaru ultimately realizes that his friends are genuinely good people and decides to act in response to how they view the normal Subaru to save them from whatever is killing them. After finding a series of books with his name, Subaru reexperiences his life, recovering his old persona. Now with full knowledge about his enemies, Subaru makes a strategy to pass the tests of the tower but is unable to save Shaula from her own death. In the aftermath, Rem awakes in front of Subaru who reintroduces himself to her upon realizing she has no memories.

=== Other appearances ===
Subaru also appears in the mobile game Re:Zero − Starting Life in Another World: Lost in Memories, which features branching paths that lead Subaru Natsuki to a different outcome of the story, turning into a "What if" scenario. The visual novel based on the series, titled Re:Zero – Starting Life in Another World – Death or Kiss, tells an original story that differs from the light novel and the anime, and allows the player to choose between routes featuring Emilia, Rem, Ram, Felt, Beatrice, Crusch, Priscilla, or Anastasia. Subaru has also made an appearance in the tactical-adventure video game Re:Zero − Starting Life in Another World: The Prophecy of the Throne. He stars in the crossover comedy series Isekai Quartet where the cast of Re:Zero interact with other isekai series in a school.

== Reception ==
=== Critical reception ===
Critical reception to Subaru in the light novels has been mixed. At Anime News Network, Theron Martin lauded the series for being a somewhat fresher take on the "transported to another world" concept, but leveled criticism at it for bumpy and awkwardly timed dialogue and a tendency for redundancy, making Subaru come across as unlikable. In the next volume of the series, Rebecca Silverman praised Subaru's use of Return by Death to save the people he cares about.

Andy Hanley from UK Anime Network considered the use of Subaru's death scenes in the anime adaptation as one of the most unique elements from the series due to how the narrative uses it to reexamine the cast, most notably Subaru. He described Subaru as "a very flawed and very human character, whose personality and reactions are very distinctly coloured by the events he's witnessed and taken part in." Anime Now had mixed feelings towards Subaru; they regarded him as a "genre-savvy character" as while he might have common traits from other characters, his character arc makes him highly complex. The Fandom Post enjoyed Subaru's gradual accomplishments in the anime, despite his weak initial portrayal, as by the ninth episode he obtains Ram's trust while discovering the shaman's identity.

In another article centered around Subaru, Manga.Tokyo compared the differences between the light novel and the anime based on how he deals with a suicide in order to undo Rem's death. The difference from the anime shows Subaru's psychological state and the way his suicide was highly praised for being more realistic than in the original printed version. Crunchyroll stated that despite the attention given to romances involving Subaru with other characters, his relationship with Emilia proved to be more appealing based on Subaru's progression as a character and the mutual help they give each other, something that other couples failed to deliver. When it comes to Subaru's amnesia in the fourth season, Polygon noted a tactic the writer used to bring back the series's charm of horror and gore as Subaru's evolution following the second season made the story feel like a more typical fantasy series, drawing parallels with the film Memento.

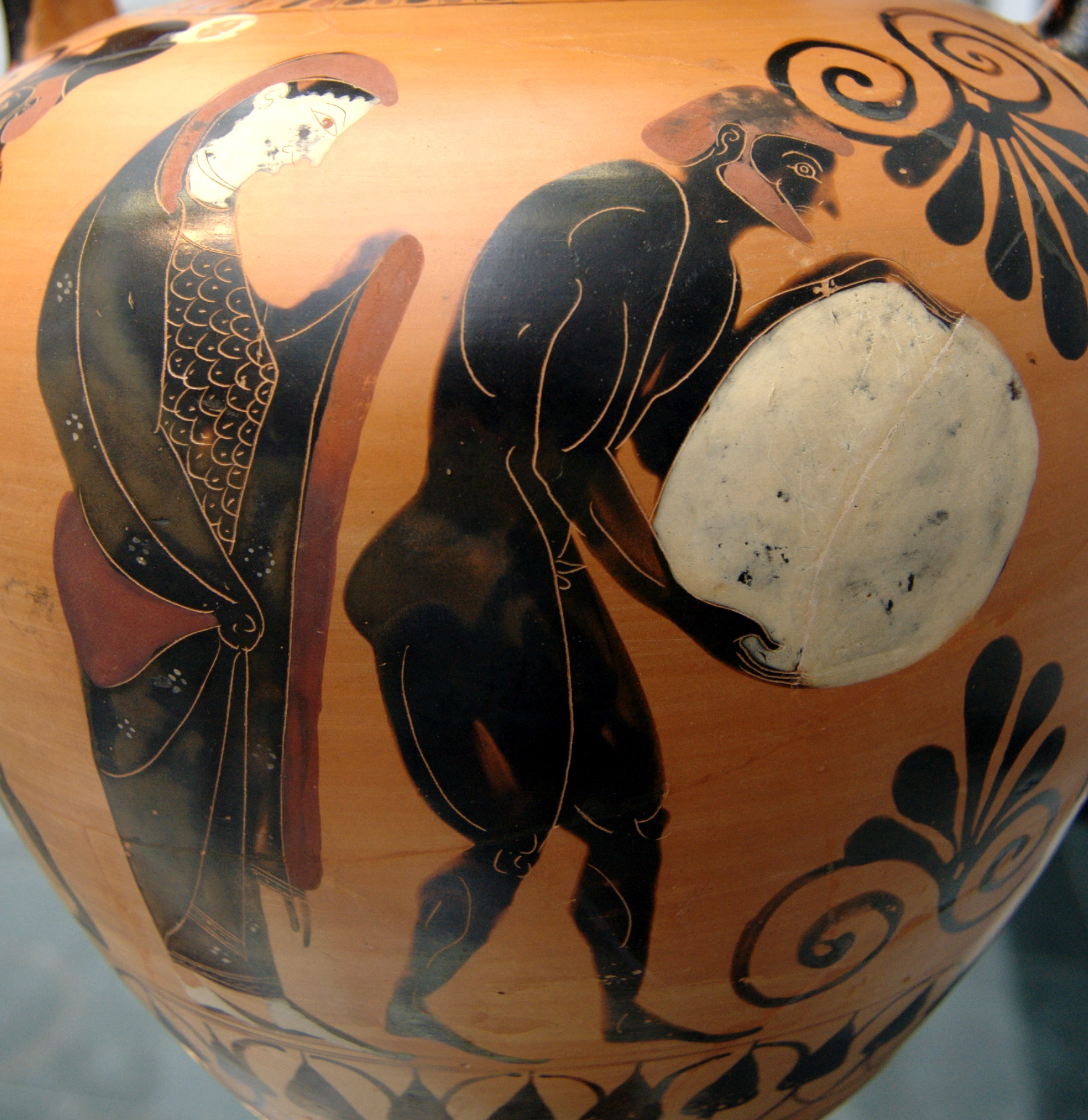
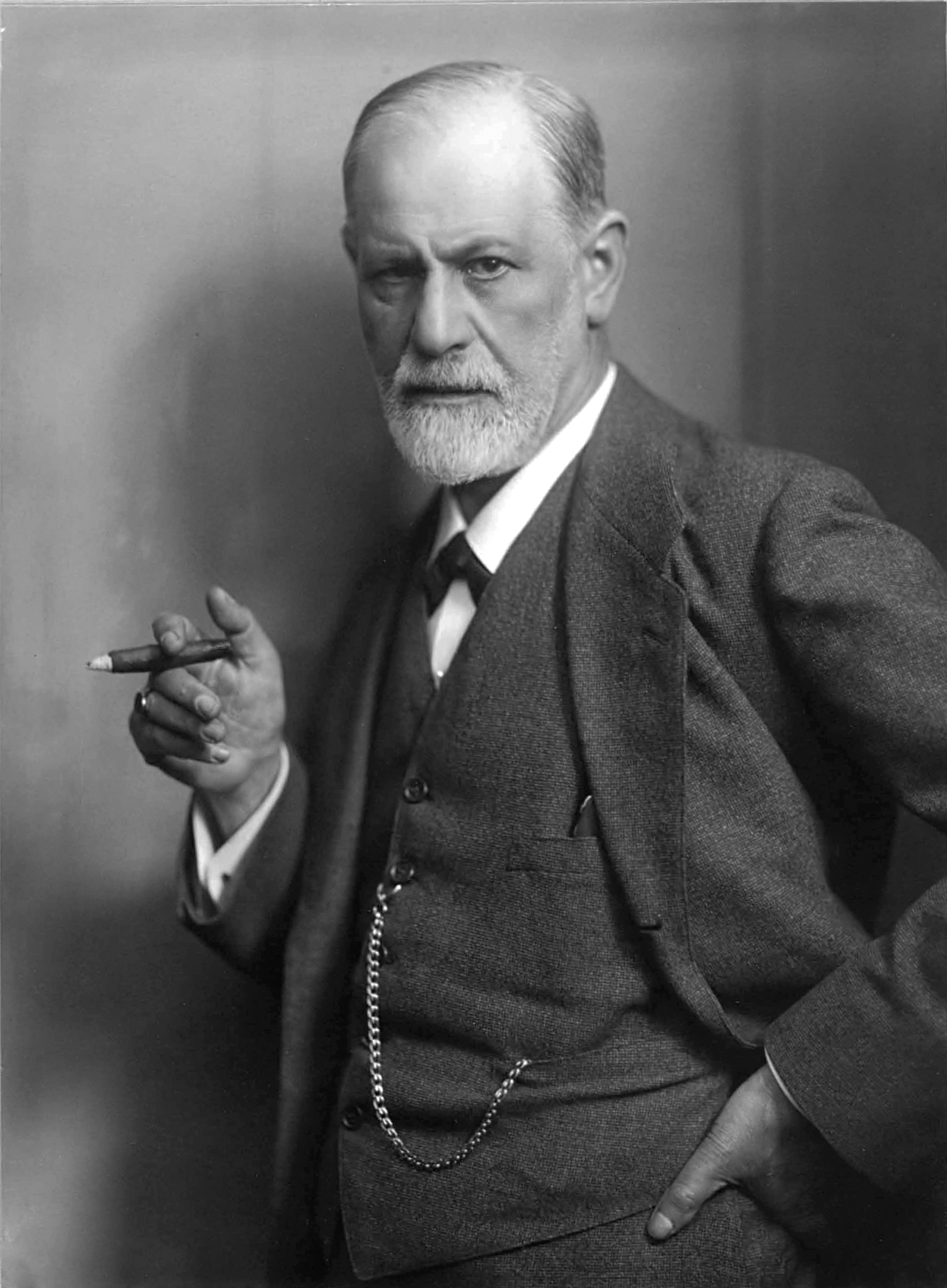
Subaru's character has been compared to Sisyphus (left) from Greek myths as well as the Thanatophobia anxiety hypothesized by Sigmund Freud

=== Analysis ===
In the book Mitos y Pantallas, Subaru was compared to Sisyphus from the Greek myths as both cheat death in their lives. However, the isekai protagonist does not seek his own suffering but instead lives. Subaru's skill and psychological state were also linked with the concept of Thanatophobia of Sigmund Freud which is also rooted in Greek myths based on the god Thanatos.

Kim Morrissy regarded Subaru's traits as unique within the isekai genre as, rather than accomplishing tasks with ease, he suffers from multiple traumas that lead to self-loathing. THEM Anime Reviews had a negative impression of Subaru and criticized the impulsive demeanor Subaru has due to his quick actions, as well as his persistent use of Return by Death which reduced the tension in the anime. They also describe him as the "antithesis" of Kirito due to Subaru's poor life contrasting against the latter's. The reviewers note that the character arc had notable development in the anime, and point out a scene where Subaru has a deep conversation with Rem which helps him become more likable.

Manga.Tokyo notes that Subaru's attempts at saving others through his own deaths made the Japanese audience appreciate him more. The writer feels Subaru's deaths were gruesome and compared them to Puella Magi Madoka Magica's. The site also compared Subaru with Konosuba's main character Kazuma Sato due to their similar situations as they find themselves in different worlds. However, rather than focusing on quests like in other isekai stories, the two series are more character-driven. The similarities between Subaru and Kazuma led to more parallelism in Isekai Quartet, which Anime News Network found hilarious. Crunchyroll saw him as a more realistic isekai protagonist due to his notable flaws and realism, with his having to mature in order to develop as a character and make the story progress positively.

Anime Feminist praised the handling of Subaru's characterization as coming across as a deconstruction of a "nice guy" who is desperate for somebody else's affection, but often becomes manipulative or controlling of those he likes. The writer was praised for still making Subaru come across as a relatable protagonist. This attitude is mostly seen through his desire to provoke feelings from Emilia which leads to several strong scenes where the protagonist's mental state deteriorates into causing toxic behavior and a traumatic state due to his hero complex, becoming the victim of multiple enemies that take his life, and having to stand to live again. The handling of Subaru's development was praised for showing the protagonist a harsh reality rather than other isekai protagonists who are always rewarded for their actions, citing Naofumi Iwatani from The Rising of the Shield Hero or Rudeus Greyrat from Mushoku Tensei who rarely get punished and even get their love interest. Screenrant also found Subaru as an antithesis to typical isekai heroes and instead a "weaponization of self-insertion as a concept" as the main character of Re:Zero is the "tragic mirror constructed solely from the viewers' empathy and suspension of disbelief." Additionally, Subaru was praised for not being the only hero of the series, with the series providing several supporting characters who often overshadow him when it comes to the power they possess.

=== Popularity and awards ===
The character won the Best Character (Male) award in the 2015–2016 Newtype Anime Awards. In a poll by Crunchyroll, Subaru, with 2,246 votes, was voted as the second best Re:Zero character after Rem. In the Crunchyroll 2020 awards, Yūsuke Kobayashi won the category of best male seiyuu (voice actor) for his role as Subaru.

=== Cultural impact ===
The anime's fourth season led to multiple internet memes involving Subaru's mental health as he loses his memories and pretends to kill somebody. Fans started creating satirical videos, using artificial intelligence, involving Subaru running across a tower's stairs as he smiles maniacally. This led to the nickname of "Aura Monster" and "Happy Birthday Daniel".
