= Emilia (Re:Zero) =

Fictional character in the Re:Zero series

- Re:Zero character
- Emilia as illustrated by Shin'ichirō Ōtsuka
- First appearance: Prologue: "The Waste Heat of the Beginning" (2014)
- Created by: Tappei Nagatsuki
- Voiced by: Kayli Mills (English); Rie Takahashi (Japanese)

Emilia (Japanese: エミリア, Hepburn: Emiria) is a character from Tappei Nagatsuki's light novel series Re:Zero serving as the primary heroine. A half human half-elf living in a fantasy world, Emilia meets the young protagonist Subaru Natsuki who becomes attached to her. She is a candidate to become the next ruler in the royal election and become the Queen of Lugnica. During her trials presented in the story arcs of the novels, Emilia is comforted by Subaru which leads her accept her own identity, eventually choosing him as her only knight.

Tappei Nagatsuki created Emilia out of his ideal of her type being a heroine he wanted to have in the story with the protagonist being devoted to her too. Her design was originally made by Shin'ichirō Ōtsuka for the light novels. Emilia is voiced by Rie Takahashi in Japanese and Kayli Mills in English in the anime adaptation.

The character has been praised for the role and character arc across the anime adaptation, coming across as an outstanding heroine. While sometimes overshadowed by Rem as in early seasons, Emilia was also praised for her relationship with Subaru grows from a deconstruction of an attempt of manipulation to a more authentic romance.

== Appearances ==
Emilia is a silver-haired half-elf girl and a Spirit Art User; she is one of the candidates to become the next ruler in the royal election, which would make her the 42nd Queen of Lugunica. The main character Natsuki Subaru, first meets her when her insignia is stolen by Felt, which she needs to possess in order to be eligible to participate in the election. She is from the Frozen Forest, and is 117 years old chronologically (though her biological age is 17, as she was frozen for 100 years inside the forest). Her mental state is still that of a teenager. "Satella", is also the name of the "Witch of Envy", whose appearance is said to resemble her own and is responsible for the discrimination against half-elves. Emilia is often accompanied by Puck, a familiar and a spirit in the form of a cat. His true identity is that of "Beast of the End of the Eternally Frozen Lands", one of 4 Great Spirits of the world who can control heat.

Among the half breeds and other discriminated or disenfranchised races and people in Lugunica, she is seen as their hope for a better future due to her ideal of democracy and better social equality. Because of her heritage and resemblance to Satella, however, Emilia is often shunned and hated by most people, leaving her lonely and without any friends prior to meeting Subaru. Initially, she regards Subaru as a helpful boy but powerless, and for that reason always needs to be taken care of. After he risks his life to save her from the Witch's Cult, however, Emilia starts to develop deep feelings for him, as Subaru is the first person after her awakening from being frozen to ever make her feel truly happy, accepted and loved. Later on she chooses Subaru as her knight.

== Creation ==
Early concept art for the characters Subaru and Emilia

The light novel Re:Zero started due to the desire of Tappei Nagatsuki's desire to write the heroine Emilia. He specifically liked silverhaired heroines to the point he considers Emilia his favorite character in the entire series since Subaru's journey to protect her represents the core of the story. Emilia's lines makes him particularly nervous and flustered as he has an impression of her being cute in every line she says, mainly though it is because he is madly in love with her. As a result, Nagatasuki takes a break when writing her and switches to others.

Originally, Emilia's character design by Shin'ichirō Ōtsuka appeared plain, so a number of features were added to make her more interesting. Series' editor at MF Bunko J, Masahito Ikemoto, specified that she must fit the "archetypal heroine" mold. Emilia's fight with Subaru appealed to the staff themselves due to the negativity Subaru displays. The multiple arguments between fans involving whether Emilia or Rem are the true heroines of the series led to Watanabe choose the former, claiming that Rem was a "subheroine", believing Emilia's characterization fits more the archetype.

In Japanese, Emilia is voiced by Rie Takahashi. The actress was impressed by Emilia's trial as it showed her childhood which shows how it affected her growth into the character from the present. She also enjoyed the growing relationship between the heroine and the protagonist due to starting as a tragic relationship and evolving into a more romantic one to the point their dynamic in the third season feels natural.

Kayli Mills voices Emilia in the English dub. She was a fan of the Re:Zero before auditioning and assumed that being cast was a mistake. Mills said Emilia is endearing thanks to her unwavering, good-hearted nature. Additionally, she likes how she supports others despite receiving hatred and prejudice as a result of being a half-elf.

== Critical reception ==
In "Which Re:Zero Girl Should Win the Election?", an Anime News Network focused on the anime's first season, Lynzee Loveridge said Emilia's number one goal of signifies a major changed in the order in Lugunica, symbolizing a "small light at the end of the tunnel for a better future" and thus rooted for her to win. With the development of the first season, writers from Anime News Network said Emilia is a more appealing character, claiming that while Subaru is well-written, he sometimes comes across as unlikable when compared to Emilia. This was made more noticeable with the original video animation that adapts season 1 with more focus on key characters, most notably Emilia. In contrast, Rem managed to overshadow the heroine Emilia despite being a supporting character in multiple polls. Additionally, Rem was referred as the true heroine of the series.

The love triangle involving Emilia, Subaru and Rem appealed to the writers too for how Subaru is conflicted about protecting Emilia but his constant failure almost led him to give up but it is Rem rather than Emilia the one who motivates him to keep fighting for Emilia's side. Anime Feminist praised the handling of Subaru's characterization as comes across as deconsturction of a "nice guy" who is desperate for Emilia's affection, but often becomes manipulative or controlling to those he likes. The writer was praised for still making Subaru come across as a relatable protagonist. This atttitude is mostly seen through his desire to get responding feelings from Emilia which leads to several strong scenes where the protagonist's mental state deteriorates into a toxic behavior and traumatic state due to his hero complex and becoming the victim of multiple of enemies that take his life and he has to stand to live again. Crunchyroll also stated that despite the multiple attention given to romances involving Subaru with other characters, his relationship with Emilia proved to be more appealing based on Subaru's progression as a character and the mutual help they give each other, something which other couples failed to deliver, as more notably in the second season of the anime.

By the time of the anime's third season, Emilia was noted for her growth; ScreenRant also said that Emilia is one of the most outstanding heroines in the isekai genre as noted in the third season of the anime when she notices that Subaru tries to keep saving other on his own but Emilia's development in her previous appearances where she fights racism allows her to grow into a stronger character to fight Regulus alongside the protagonist. GameRant said that in retrospect, Emilia's character has been the subject of undergoing a notable growth by surpassing her isolation she initially suffered due to being called Witch and lacked self-worth to the point she helped others at the expense of herself. While Subaru's arc is involving his resilience with death, Emilia's arc "revolves around conquering emotional death—fears of abandonment, self-doubt, and the trauma of isolation".
