= Warlords of Sigrdrifa =

Japanese anime television series

- Anime key visual

戦翼のシグルドリーヴァ (Sen'yoku no Shigurudorīva)
- Genre: Fantasy
- Created by: War Wings Club (戦翼倶楽部)
- Light novel

Warlords of Sigrdrifa Rusalka
- Written by: Tappei Nagatsuki
- Illustrated by: Takuya Fujima
- Published by: Kadokawa Shoten
- English publisher: NA: Yen Press
- Imprint: Kadokawa Sneaker Bunko
- Original run: May 1, 2020 – July 1, 2020
- Volumes: 2
- Manga

Senyoku no Sigrdrifa Non-Scramble
- Written by: Kanari Abe
- Published by: Media Factory
- Magazine: Monthly Comic Alive
- Original run: July 27, 2020 – March 26, 2022
- Volumes: 2
- Light novel

Senyoku no Sigrdrifa Sakura
- Written by: Tappei Nagatsuki
- Published by: Kadokawa Shoten
- Imprint: Kadokawa Sneaker Bunko
- Original run: October 1, 2020 – December 1, 2020
- Volumes: 2
- Anime television series
- Directed by: Hirotaka Tokuda
- Produced by: Yasuhiro Nakajima; Tomoyuki Oowada; Manabu Jinguuji; Gorou Ishida
- Written by: Tappei Nagatsuki (Note: Series composition and screenplay); Takaaki Suzuki (Note: World setting and screenplay)
- Music by: Shigeo Komori; Hajime Hyakkoku
- Studio: A-1 Pictures
- Licensed by: Crunchyroll
- Original network: Tokyo MX, BS11, GYT, GTV, Chukyo TV, CTC, MBS
- English network: US: Crunchyroll Channel
- Original run: October 3, 2020 – December 26, 2020
- Episodes: 12
- Manga

Senyoku no Sigrdrifa Kurū no Eiyū
- Written by: Takeshi Nogami
- Published by: Kadokawa Shoten
- Magazine: Comic Hu
- Original run: October 4, 2020 – July 4, 2021
- Volumes: 2
- icon

Warlords of Sigrdrifa (Japanese: 戦翼のシグルドリーヴァ, Hepburn: Sen'yoku no Shigurudorīva; "Battle Wing Sigrdrifa") is a Japanese anime television series produced by A-1 Pictures. It aired from October to December 2020. Two light novel series, titled Warlords of Sigrdrifa Rusalka and Senyoku no Sigrdrifa Sakura, were published by Kadokawa Shoten under their Kadokawa Sneaker Bunko imprint. Additionally, two manga series, titled Senyoku no Sigrdrifa Non-Scramble and Senyoku no Sigrdrifa Kurū no Eiyū, are serialized by Kadokawa Shoten.

== Premise ==
When humanity is threatened by mysterious Pillars, the Norse god Odin offers humanity a way to fight back: young female pilots called "Valkyries", each piloting a special, magically enhanced plane capable of fighting this mysterious new foe. One of these Valkyries is Claudia Braford, a German pilot who gets transferred to Tateyama Air Base, where she befriends a trio of Japanese Valkyries, and learns the value of friendship.

== Characters ==
Claudia Bradford (クラウディア・ブラフォード, Kuraudia Burafōdo)
Voiced by: Hibiku Yamamura (Japanese); Katelyn Barr (English)
Nicknamed "Claudy" (クラウ, Kurau), she is a socially-withdrawn pilot and one of the world's most experienced Valkyries with the title "Valkyrie Schwertleite". Although she is praised as the "Valkyrie of Salvation", she silently refers to herself as the "Grim Reaper" because she survives battles that kill all of her teammates. Upon being transferred to Japan, she is surprised that the Japanese military is less formal to what she is normally used but nevertheless endeavors to befriend her new teammates. She flies a Gloster Gladiator.
Miyako Muguruma (六車 宮古, Muguruma Miyako)
Voiced by: Nene Hieda (Japanese); Sarah Wiedenheft (English)
An energetic and friendly Valkyrie stationed at Tateyama Base. Miyako maintains a positive outlook on life and works to ensure everybody is smiling. She brings her katana with her on missions. She flies a Nakajima Ki-44.
Azuzu Komagome (駒込 アズズ, Komagome Azuzu)
Voiced by: M.A.O (Japanese); Brittany Lauda (English)
A socially awkward and slightly arrogant Valkyrie stationed at Tateyama Base. Azuzu is a genius inventor and master tactician, often modifying her plane with special equipment and coming up with clever plans to combat Pillars. She was the de facto leader of the 909th Squadron until Claudia was transferred in. She flies a Heinkel He 100.
Sonoka Watarai (渡来 園香, Watarai Sonoka)
Voiced by: Sayaka Kikuchi (Japanese); Tia Ballard (English)
A kind hearted Valkyrie stationed at Tateyama Base. Sonoka is often polite and reserved, but when in the cockpit, she becomes the most reckless pilot in the squadron. She flies a Macchi M.C.72.
Rusalka Evereska (ルサルカ・エヴァレスカ, Rusaruka Evaresuka)
Voiced by: Ai Kayano
Lizbeth Crown (リズベット・クラウン, Rizubetto Kuraun)
Voiced by: Mikako Komatsu
A European S-class Valkyrie who previously flew with Claudia.
Leyli Haltija (レイリー・ハルティア, Reirī Harutia)
Voiced by: Hitomi Ueda
A European S-class Valkyrie who previously flew with Claudia.
Misato Honjo (本庄 美智, Honjō Misato)
Voiced by: Yui Horie (Japanese); Kristen McGuire (English)
Nono Kazuura (和浦 野乃, Kazuura Nono)
Voiced by: Rina Hidaka
Komachi Mikuri (御厨 小町, Mikuri Komachi)
Voiced by: Sumire Uesaka
Ichiro Satomi (里美 一郎, Satomi Ichirō)
Voiced by: Hiroaki Hirata
Maintenance teamleader (整備班長, Seibi Hanchō)
Voiced by: Shigeru Chiba
Ronge (ロン毛)
Voiced by: Yūichi Nakamura
A member of Shield Squadron who assists the 909th against the Pillars. He is identified by his mullet and red headband. He flies a Mitsubishi F-15J.
Kinpatsu (金髪)
Voiced by: Tomokazu Sugita
A member of Shield Squadron who assists the 909th against the Pillars. He is identified by his blond buzz cut. He flies a Mitsubishi F-15J.
Gurasan (グラサン)
Voiced by: Mafia Kajita
A member of Shield Squadron who assists the 909th against the Pillars. He is identified by his bald head and sunglasses. He flies a Mitsubishi F-15J.
Odin (オーディン, Ōdin)
Voiced by: Akira Kamiya, Yumiri Hanamori (young) (Japanese); Ciarán Strange (English)
King of the Norse gods. He offers humanity the opportunity to defend itself from the Pillars through the power of the Valkyries. He can change his physical appearance, often choosing to look like an old man or a young boy, and holds some interest in Claudia.
Yayoi Amatsuka (天塚弥生, Amatsuka Yayoi)
Voiced by: Marina Inoue
A veteran Valkyrie who travels all over Japan to respond to hotspots. Amatsuka is already close friends with Miyako, Azuzu, and Sonoka, though her relationship with Sonoka has become strained due to an event in their past. She flies a Grumman F7F Tigercat.
Kurumi Suzuhara (鈴原くるみ, Suzuhara Kurumi)
Voiced by: Kanon Takao
Moe Isurugi (石動萌, Isurugi Moe)
Voiced by: Mayu Sagara (Japanese); Rachel Thompson (English)
Toshizo Okita (沖田歳三, Okita Toshizō)
Voiced by: Akio Otsuka^{Ep. 6 credits}
Alma Conturo (アルマ・コントーロ, Aruma Kontōro)
Voiced by: Akari Kitō^{Ep. 6 credits}
Lhasa Lurizar (ラサ・ルリザーレ, Rasa Rurizāre)
Voiced by: Shizuka Itō^{Ep. 6 credits}
Nina Kolmakov (ニーナ・コルマコフ, Nīna Korumakofu)
Voiced by: Momo Asakura^{Ep. 6 credits}

== Media ==
=== Light novels ===
A light novel spin-off prequel series to the anime, titled Warlords of Sigrdrifa Rusalka (戦翼のシグルドリーヴァ Rusalka), was published by Kadokawa Shoten under their Kadokawa Sneaker Bunko imprint. It is written by series writer Tappei Nagatsuki and illustrated by Takuya Fujima. The light novel is licensed in North America by Yen Press.

Another light novel spin-off prequel titled Senyoku no Sigrdrifa Sakura (戦翼のシグルドリーヴァ Sakura), also written by Nagatsuki, was published by Kadokawa Shoten under their Kadokawa Sneaker Bunko imprint.

==== Volume list ====
===== Warlords of Sigrdrifa Rusalka =====
No.	Original release date	Original ISBN	English release date	English ISBN
1	May 1, 2020	978-4-04109402-0	May 24, 2022	978-1-97-533514-4
2	July 1, 2020	978-4-04109403-7		

===== Senyoku no Sigrdrifa Sakura =====
No.	Japanese release date	Japanese ISBN
1	October 1, 2020	978-4-04-109398-6
2	December 1, 2020	978-4-04-109401-3

=== Manga ===
A manga spin-off series by Kanari Abe, titled Senyoku no Sigrdrifa Non-Scramble (戦翼のシグルドリーヴァ ノンスクランブル), began serialization in Kadokawa Shoten's Monthly Comic Alive magazine on July 27, 2020.

A second series by Takeshi Nogami, titled Senyoku no Sigrdrifa Kurū no Eiyū (戦翼のシグルドリーヴァ 狂撃の英雄), began serialization on Kadokawa Shoten's Comic Hu website on October 4, 2020.

==== Volume list ====
===== Senyoku no Sigrdrifa Non-Scramble =====
No.	Release date	ISBN
1	November 21, 2020	978-4-04-064746-3
2	March 23, 2022	978-4-04-681132-5

===== Senyoku no Sigrdrifa Kurū no Eiyū =====
No.	Release date	ISBN
1	December 4, 2020	978-4-04-064821-7
2	August 4, 2021	978-4-04-680112-8

=== Anime ===
The anime television series was written by Tappei Nagatsuki and directed by Hirotaka Tokuda, making his directorial debut, featuring character designs from Takuya Fujima. Shigeo Komori and Hajime Hyakkoku composed the series' music, while Takaaki Suzuki served as the co-writer and provided world-building and research for the series. The series was originally set to premiere in July 2020. However, it aired from October 3 to December 26, 2020, due to the COVID-19 pandemic.

Akari Nanawo performed the opening theme song "Higher's High," while Spira Spica performed the ending theme song "Sayonara Namida" (サヨナラナミダ; "Goodbye Tears"). The series began with a 1-hour special and ran for 12 episodes.

The series was licensed by Funimation via Aniplex. On November 6, 2020, Funimation announced that the series would receive an English dub, which premiered the following day. Following Sony's acquisition of Crunchyroll, the series was moved to Crunchyroll.

No.	Title (Note: All English titles are taken from Funimation.)	Directed by	Written by	Original release date
1	"Welcome to Tateyama Base!"; Transliteration: "Tateyama Kichi e Yōkoso!" (Japanese: 館山基地へようこそ！)	Hirotaka Tokuda	Tappei Nagatsuki; Takaaki Suzuki	October 3, 2020
In 2020, mysterious alien lifeforms called Pillars appear, threatening the existence of humanity. When even nuclear weapons fail to destroy them, the world's leaders are left wondering how to resist. Suddenly, a boy claiming to be Odin appears, promising to help humanity battle against Ragnarök by providing Valkyries who have the ability to destroy the Pillars. However, instead of modern jet fighters, Valkyries fly magically enhanced propeller driven fighters. In 2025, after a successful but costly attack on a Pillar in Europe, S-class Valkyrie Claudia is transferred to Japan. On the way there she is ambushed, but is assisted by a local, inexperienced Valkyrie squadron. Later, when she arrives at the Tateyama Base, Claudia meets the pilots she previously encountered, Miyako, Sonoka, and Azuzu, who are members of the 909th Valkyrie Wing. Claudia believes she was sent there due to her reputation as the "Grim Reaper". Suddenly, a Pillar is detected approaching Tateyama, but since it is underwater, it is almost impossible to attack. Azuzu comes up with a plan to force it to the surface with explosives. Working together, the 909th are able to destroy the Pillar. Afterwards, the 909th and Tateyama Base staff officially welcome Claudia.
2	"Umihotaru Sea Assault!"; Transliteration: "Umihotaru Kaijō Totsugeki-sen!" (Japanese: 海ほたる海上突撃戦！)	Minami Yoshida	Tappei Nagatsuki; Takaaki Suzuki	October 10, 2020
Miyako organizes a get together between Claudia and the rest of the 909th so that they can get to know each other better. However, a Pillar appears offshore near Umihotaru, creating a large barrier and trapping a number of civilians and one of Tateyama's reconnaissance helicopters. The Pillar is also slowly draining the life force of the trapped civilians, putting a time limit on when they can be rescued. Azuzu comes up with a plan to fly through an underwater subway tunnel, which will allow them to pass under the Pillar's barrier. Getting up close to the Pillar, Miyako is able to break its water barrier while Sonoka uses fire retardant to neutralize its heat barrier, allowing Claudia to destroy it. With the mission a success thanks to their teamwork, Claudia finally begins to feel that she can be a part of the 909th. Meanwhile, it is revealed that Odin is personally observing Claudia's actions.
3	"Disaster Recovery Assessment!"; Transliteration: "Gekisen-chi Kaifuku Chōsa Ninmu!" (Japanese: 激戦地回復調査任務！)	Yuki Watanabe	Tappei Nagatsuki; Takaaki Suzuki	October 17, 2020
Early in the morning, Claudia spots Miyako cleaning when Odin suddenly summons her. While praising her, he confirms that Sakura has died. He then tells her to muster as much strength as she can. Later, Claudia helps Miyako cook breakfast. Afterwards, Claudia has a conversation with Sonoka and Miyako in the cafeteria. Azuzu then arrives as well. Suddenly, the commander, Ichiro Satomi, shows up and he asks them to go on a disaster recovery assessment of Umihotaru. Claudia, Miyako, and Sonoka arrive at Umihotaru where they spend the day having fun. While they are taking a break, Miyako and Sonoka reveal to Claudia why they came to Tateyama. Miyako then heads off when she receives a call from Azuzu. Later that night, Claudia meets Azuzu in the hospital where they see Miyako with a mortally wounded soldier. Claudia and Miyako comfort the soldier before he passes away. In her bedroom, Claudia thinks about her reputation as the "Grim Reaper". The next morning, Claudia hangs out with Miyako, Sonoka, and Azuzu in the cafeteria.
4	"Tateyama Castle Swimsuit Skirmish!"; Transliteration: "Tateyama-jō Mizugi Danjo Kaiyū-sen!" (Japanese: 館山城水着男女回遊戦！)	Tsuyoshi Tobita	Tappei Nagatsuki; Takaaki Suzuki	October 24, 2020
The 909th are battling against four Pillars, which seem to endlessly regenerate when Azuzu's plane is hit. She then passes out after she makes an emergency landing. When she awakes, she finds out that the Pillars emit ultra high frequency sound waves whenever one of them is destroyed, which she surmises is them signaling to the other Pillars to help regenerate them. However, the Valkyries learn that one of the Pillars has appeared just outside of the base, cutting them off from access to their planes. Ronge, Kinpatsu, and Gurasan overhear the conversation and offer to help take them to the base, though everybody must wear swimsuits first. The trio then lead the Valkyries through a secret underground passage that takes them directly to the base. Once they finally reach the base, the Valkyries receive backup from another Valkyrie. They then take off to fight the four Pillars, and Azuzu instructs them that in order to defeat the Pillars, they must all be destroyed simultaneously. After the 909th defeat the Pillars, they meet the new Valkyrie in person.
5	"Tateyama Joint Forces!"; Transliteration: "Tateyama Kichi Gōryū Yūgeki-tai!" (Japanese: 館山基地合流遊撃隊！)	Keisuke Inoue	Tappei Nagatsuki; Takaaki Suzuki	October 31, 2020
The Valkyrie who helped the 909th is introduced as an old friend of Miyako, Azuzu, and Sonoka's named Yayoi Amatsuka, who is accompanied by her own squad. At the base's bathhouse, Amatsuka reveals that they are at the base due to a counteroffensive against the Fuji Primary Pillar. Afterwards, Azuzu and Claudia leave to meet Odin. When a skeptical Azuzu confronts him, he assures her that the Fuji Primary Pillar will become inactive, leaving it vulnerable to attack. He then tells her what her glaring flaws are as a Valkyrie. When Claudia asks him about her transfer to Japan, Odin confirms that a replacement for Sakura was needed. The next day, Satomi tells everyone about how the counteroffensive will commence. Later, while the 909th and Amatsuka are eating lunch, Sonoka heads back to the base. Once Sonoka leaves, it is revealed that Miyako was trying to smooth things over between Sonoka and Amatsuka as Sonoka had a falling out with Amatsuka. In Satomi's office, Sonoka and Satomi have a conversation about their past. That night, the base monitors the Fuji Primary Pillar and it goes inactive as predicted. Odin gleefully proclaims that the coming of Ragnarök is nigh.
6	"Fuji Pillar Assault!"; Transliteration: "Fuji Pirā Kōryaku-sen!" (Japanese: 富士ピラー攻略戦！)	Kōta Mori	Tappei Nagatsuki; Takaaki Suzuki	November 7, 2020
The 909th join a coalition of Valkyries from all around the world and air forces who have gathered for the assault on the Fuji Primary Pillar, including Claudia's previous squadmates Lizbet and Leyli. Amatsuka then privately meets with Satomi in an attempt to convince him to keep Sonoka grounded, though Satomi suspects that Amatsuka sabotaged Sonoka's plane in order to prevent her from flying on an important mission in the past. Sonoka overhears this and is outraged. Amatsuka explains that in a mission two years prior, she had a bad feeling about it and sabotaged Sonoka's plane. During that mission, their entire squadron was wiped out with Amatsuka barely surviving. Sonoka was deeply traumatized by the experience ever since. The attack on the Fuji Primary Pillar then commences, with the Valkyries being able to breach the Pillar's outer wall. The 909th fly into the breach, which seems to lead to a separate dimension. There, they find the wrecks of countless Valkyrie planes that had been shot down by the Pillars, and encounter a monstrous being that Odin identifies as Thor. Suddenly, previously shot down Valkyrie planes appear and attack the 909th, including one that was flown by Sonoka and Amatsuka's deceased squadmate Jinguuji.
7	"Fuji Pillar Retreat!"; Transliteration: "Fuji Pirā Tettai-sen!" (Japanese: 富士ピラー撤退戦！)	Takayuki Kikuchi	Tappei Nagatsuki; Takaaki Suzuki	November 14, 2020
Inside the Fuji Primary Pillar, the 909th quickly realize their opponents are fallen Valkyries, and are attacked by Sakura's plane. Claudia, Leyli, and Lizbet distract Sakura while the rest of the 909th attack Thor. Outside the Fuji Primary Pillar, additional Pillars begin to appear, risking overwhelming the human forces, causing Major General Okita to order a retreat. During the retreat, Sonoka is injured. Meanwhile, at the base, Odin dodges Okita's questions about the true nature of Thor and Valhalla. Thor meanwhile unleashes an energy blast at the base, killing Leyli, Okita, and most of the command staff. After the battle, it is revealed that Claudia, Miyako, and Azuzu will undertake a civilian evacuation, while Amatsuka volunteered to rescue Valkyries still trapped inside the Fuji Primary Pillar. Sonoka and Amatsuka then have a private conversation where Amatsuka promises she will return. Afterwards, Amatsuka and her squad are given a sendoff. Sometime later, an injured Lizbet arrives at the rally point and she reveals that Amatsuka did not survive.
8	"Exploring a Mythical World!"; Transliteration: "Shinwa Sekai Tansaku Sakusen!" (Japanese: 神話世界探索作戦！)	Keisuke Inoue	Tappei Nagatsuki; Takaaki Suzuki	November 21, 2020
In the aftermath of the assault, the combined human forces are left in disarray with the loss of their main base and leadership. In addition, they only have 36 hours to retake Tateyama Base before it is lost to the Pillars. However, Satomi reveals that he kept emergency supplies underneath Mt. Nokogiri. Satomi also lets Azuzu listen to a recording of the final conversation between Odin and Okita. Meanwhile, Claudia visits Lizbet in the hospital, who tells her that Amatsuka suspected Claudia is carrying some sort of secret that is key to defeating the Pillars. Azuzu comes to the same conclusion and confronts Claudia about it. Claudia remembers Odin's words, which causes a portal of light to open. With Sonoka now unwilling to fly, it is decided that Claudia and Azuzu will explore Valhalla while Miyako goes to retake Tateyama with Shield Squadron. In Valhalla, Claudia and Azuzu begin to learn about Norse mythology and Odin and Thor's true nature when they are suddenly attacked by a Pillar. At Tateyama, Miyako is caught inside a Secondary Pillar while Sonoka is forced to tend to a pregnant woman going into labor.
8.5	"Battle Records of the 909th Valkyrie Wing!"; Transliteration: "Dai 909 Senjutsu Hime-tai Sentō Kiroku!" (Japanese: 第909戦術姫隊戦闘記録！)	N/A	N/A	November 28, 2020
A recap episode summarizing the first eight episodes.
9	"Retaking Tateyama Air Base!"; Transliteration: "Tateyama Kokyō Dakkan-sen!" (Japanese: 館山故郷奪還戦！)	Masakazu Ohara	Tappei Nagatsuki; Takaaki Suzuki	December 5, 2020
A frantic Sonoka attempts to fly her plane, but she still has self-esteem issues. Inside the Secondary Pillar, Miyako and Shield Squadron are struggling against it while Claudia and Azuzu are able to escape from Valhalla. Back at the shelter, Sonoka learns that the Pillars are after the pregnant woman's baby since it is rumored that they prioritize stealing the life force from young people and children. Just as Sonoka begins to lose hope, she remembers to look inside Amatsuka's good luck charm, which gives her the motivation needed to fly again. She then joins Miyako and together they defeat the Secondary Pillar to retake Tateyama. Once the 909th reunite, they arrive at the shelter in time to hear the baby being born. Later that night, Azuzu reports that Odin lied about Ragnarök. Meanwhile, in Valhalla, it is revealed that Odin survived.
10	"The Eve Before the Battle of Tateyama Bay!"; Transliteration: "Tateyama-wan Kessen Zen'ya!" (Japanese: 館山湾決戦前夜！)	Tsuyoshi Tobita	Tappei Nagatsuki; Takaaki Suzuki	December 12, 2020
Satomi reports to the world's leaders that Odin lied about Ragnarök. Just then, Odin interrupts the summit meeting to declare war. At Tateyama, Sonoka and Miyako are hanging out in the bath when Miyako decides to organize the summer festival. Meanwhile, Satomi, Claudia, and Azuzu have a meeting about Odin's declaration. The next morning, Claudia and Lizbet say their goodbyes while Azuzu runs away when Miyako mentions the festival. Once Miyako finds Azuzu, they make up. That night, everyone has fun at the festival.
11	"Reattacking Fuji Pillar!"; Transliteration: "Fuji Pirā Sai-kōryaku-sen!" (Japanese: 富士ピラー再攻略戦！)	Ken Takahashi	Tappei Nagatsuki; Takaaki Suzuki	December 19, 2020
The world's nations unite for one final attack against the Fuji Primary Pillar, knowing that failure will mean the end of humanity. As the human forces make their preparations, Claudia is visited by Odin in a dream, who tries to convince her to join him, explaining that he started the war so he can obtain more einherjar to fight against Ragnarök. Claudia refuses the offer and points out that Ragnarök already occurred and the age of the gods is past, though Odin remains in denial. Finally, the human forces begin their second attack on the Fuji Primary Pillar. However, they have learned from the first attack by holding the 909th in reserve and distributing their forces to intercept Pillar reinforcements. With the other Valkyries and pilots clearing a path, the 909th are able to break through to Thor, but Odin appears with his dark Valkyries to confront them personally.
12	"Welcome to Tateyama Base!!"; Transliteration: "Tateyama Kichi e Yōkoso!!" (Japanese: 館山基地へようこそ！！)	Hirotaka Tokuda	Tappei Nagatsuki; Takaaki Suzuki	December 26, 2020
The battle continues as Claudia decides to take on Odin personally. Meanwhile, Sonoka distracts the dark Valkyries while Miyako focuses on attacking Thor and Azuzu searches for the Fuji Primary Pillar's core. As Claudia battles Odin, he reveals that she is a direct descendant of the gods, and questions her resolve. Claudia replies that she is fighting for her friends and family, and she realizes that Odin is simply afraid of being alone. Odin is enraged, but cannot bring himself to kill Claudia and retreat. Meanwhile, Shield Squadron sacrifice themselves to give Miyako the opening she needs to destroy Thor while Sonoka is able to shoot down the dark Valkyries. Azuzu reaches the core, but she encounters Odin. She manages to distract him long enough for Miyako to arrive and destroy the core. Defeated, Odin allows Azuzu to shoot him. Afterwards, the Fuji Primary Pillar disappears, resulting in a decisive victory for humanity. In the aftermath, the 909th mourn the loss of Shield Squadron, but Valkyries are still needed since the Pillars still remain in the world. The 909th welcomes two new Valkyries, Kurumi Suzuhara and Moe Isurugi, before they take off on another mission.

== See also ==
- Highspeed Etoile, another original anime television series with character designs by Takuya Fujima
- R-15, a light novel series illustrated by Takuya Fujima
- Weiß Survive, a manga series illustrated by Takuya Fujima
