= Re:Zero − Starting Life in Another World: The Prophecy of the Throne =

- Developer: Chime
- Publishers: WW: Spike Chunsoft; EU: Numskull Games
- Artist: Shinichirou Otsuka
- Platforms: Microsoft Windows; PlayStation 4; Nintendo Switch
- Release: JP: January 28, 2021; NA: January 29, 2021; PAL: February 5, 2021
- Genres: Visual novel; tactical role-playing
- Mode: Single-player

Re:Zero -Starting Life in Another World- The Prophecy of the Throne, known in Japan as Re:Zero -Starting Life in Another World- The False Royal Election Candidate is a 2021 tactical adventure video game developed by Chime published by Spike Chunsoft for Nintendo Switch, PlayStation 4 and Windows. It is the second official Re:Zero game as well as the first to be released outside of Japan and localized with English voices.

== Gameplay ==
In Re:Zero -Starting Life in Another World- The Prophecy of the Throne, the player plays the role of Subaru Natsuki, who finds himself transported to another world. They can explore the Kingdom of Lugunica and interact with either both new or familiar characters from the anime. Subaru's "Return by Death", as in the original, is an important element in terms of game systems. The characters will appear in chibi form during exploration and combat, and see their in-game illustrations during conversations. Before combat, Subaru is required to gather information for his allies. If Subaru has enough information, the player can have two different opinions to choose from and depending on the choice, the number of allies participating in the mission and the behavior of the allies during the mission will change. However, if there is a lack of information, there may be only one opinion or no opinion at all. As a result, the actions of Subaru's peers may not take effect and the difficulty of the mission may increase.

The combat runs in a 3-D turn-based battle system. The player controls characters with limited movement, similar to Sakura Wars and Valkyria Chronicles series. However, the player can only control Subaru while other characters fight independently, following the orders they're given by the player, similar to Persona 3. The player Progress through the story mainly through conversations with smooth character animations and fully voiced dialogue. Subaru can speak with characters, check out points on the map, and gather items and information. Obtaining useful items and intel is key to completing missions successfully. In "Briefings", players can devise plans with allies to decide how to proceed through upcoming missions. Subaru can propose opinions based on any items and information that have been gathered to affect the actions of his allies. Then they take action to resolve conflicts standing in the way of Subaru and his friends. Players can only control Subaru, and his allies move independently based on the decisions made during Briefings. Subaru has an "action gauge" that decreases as the player moves on. When Subaru takes some action or the action gauge reaches 0, Subaru's phase ends and the next phase begins. The player is given a limited number of turns. If Subaru doesn't meet the requirements, the mission will fail. If Subaru dies during combat, the player will automatically lose.

== Story ==
The world takes place in the Kingdom of Lugunica where humans and demi-humans alike lived together and hosting an election for becoming the next king of Lugunica. The main protagonist, Subaru Natsuki, a 17-year-old NEET who suddenly finds himself transported to another world on his way home from the convenience store. There, he meets a silver-haired half-elf girl named Emilia, and falls deeply in love with her. Upon his arrival, Subaru acquires an ability which he calls "Return by Death", that allows him to go back in time when he dies, while still retaining his memories of the previous timelines. He cannot tell anyone about this ability, because any attempt to do so causes him to black out momentarily as unseen hands emerge to squeeze his heart, and may even kill those around him.

The game centers on the Royal Selection storyline from the anime's first season (mainly around the 3rd arc of the series), but contains entirely new "what-if" events, with plot supervision by original author Tappei Nagatsuki.

One month after Subaru's new life in another world began, an emissary sent by the Royal Castle suddenly appears with news that the Royal Selection has been postponed, but offers no reason as to why. The postponement of this grand event that decides the next ruler of the Kingdom of Lugunica stirs Subaru and his friends into action. They return to the Royal Capital only to find that a sixth candidate has claimed their stake for the throne. But the Dragon Stone prophesizes that only five candidates would be chosen. With one candidate being an imposter, suspicions are immediately cast toward one woman in particular: Emilia. What answers lie beyond the mysterious web of assassination, betrayal, and conspiracies...?

== Development ==
Re:Zero -Starting Life in Another World- The Prophecy of the Throne was developed by Chime and published by Spike Chunsoft, and was fully supervised by Japanese light novel series author Tappei Nagatsuki. At the same time, he was also supervising Re:Zero -Starting Life in Another World- Lost in Memories. It also included the original light novel artist Shinichirou Otsuka who designed the characters for the game as well as characters from the series.

== Reception ==
Reception

Aggregate score
Aggregator	Score
Metacritic	NS: 75/100; PS4: 68/100

Review scores
Publication	Score
RPGamer	2.5/5
RPGFan	64/100

Re:Zero -Starting Life in Another World- The Prophecy of the Throne received mixed to generally positive reviews according to the review-aggregating website Metacritic with a score of 68/100 for the PlayStation 4 version and 75/100 for the Nintendo Switch version.
