= Re:Zero − Starting Life in Another World: Lost in Memories =

2020 video game

- App icon
- Developer: Sega
- Publisher: Sega
- Designer: Sakai Munehisa
- Engine: Live2D
- Platforms: Android; iOS
- Release: JP: September 9, 2020; KO: July 30, 2021
- Genre: Action role-playing
- Mode: Single-player

Re:Zero − Starting Life in Another World: Lost in Memories is a mobile game developed by Sega. Based on the novel series Re:Zero − Starting Life in Another World, it was the first official mobile game in the series. The game was a free-to-play game with microtransactions.

The pre-registration of the game started on May 22, 2020. As of July 27, 2020, only a Japanese-language version of the game was announced. The game was launched on September 9, 2020, in Japan servers. The Korean servers of the game launched on July 30, 2021.

The game was discontinued on May 12, 2023.

== Plot ==
=== Story ===
The game features a story that is a retelling of the anime. It features branching paths that lead Subaru Natsuki to a different outcome of the story, turning into a "What if" scenario. In addition, the game includes a new original story that was not included in the anime and the project will be supervised by the series's author Tappei Nagatsuki. It features the original voice actors Yūsuke Kobayashi, Rie Takahashi, Inori Minase, Rie Murakawa, Yumi Uchiyama, and more, reprising their roles from the anime and the opening animation will be animated by White Fox.

=== Synopsis ===
The game begins when the main character, Natsuki Subaru, who suddenly lost his memories while he wanders around in the forest at night. The mysterious girl named Shion (a game original character in Lost in Memories) suddenly rescued Subaru from being attacked by someone. With the help of Shion, who calls herself an illusionist, Subaru takes action to regain his lost memories.

In order to regain Subaru's memories, the player will first challenge the "Recollection Town Quest". In the remembrance town, he will relive the scene where Subaru's memories is reproduced with Shion, but there is also a scene where the characters he knows are attacked by the enemy's technique called "tampering".

== Gameplay ==
Lost in Memories is a turn-based role-playing game. The player can select up to a party of five. Each of them will have three attacks and has cooldown depending on which attacks. During combat, the characters will appear in chibi forms. Each character will have their own 2D illustrations that can be viewed on their stats page or using one of their moves. Additionally, the characters will have levels and skill trees called "Memory Board". Players can further strengthen characters by gaining permanent stats boosts and enhance skills.

Characters in the story can be interacted with. The game uses Live2D engine during interaction. The game features branching paths that deviate the story. The options leads the player to a different outcome of the story, turning it into a "What if" scenario. The game will show the different bonds with Subaru and the other characters had he made different choices or met under certain circumstances. Players set out in the world of "Remembrance Village" in the Subaru's memories, and proceed with "Re-experience (Story)" and "Exploration of Remembrance (Quest)" to solve the mystery of Subaru's lost memories.

== Reception ==
The game became overwhelmingly popular in Japan, receiving more than one million downloads within the first day.
