= Re:Zero =

Japanese light novel series and its adaptations

- Re:Zero − Starting Life in Another World
- First light novel volume cover, featuring Emilia

Re:ゼロから始める異世界生活 (Ri:Zero kara Hajimeru Isekai Seikatsu)
- Genre: Adventure; Dark fantasy; Isekai
- Novel series
- Written by: Tappei Nagatsuki
- Published by: Shōsetsuka ni Narō (self-published)
- Original run: April 20, 2012 – present
- Light novel
- Written by: Tappei Nagatsuki
- Illustrated by: Shinichirou Otsuka
- Published by: Media Factory
- English publisher: NA: Yen Press
- Imprint: MF Bunko J
- Original run: January 24, 2014 – present
- Volumes: 45 + 6 side stories and 14 short story collections
- Manga

Chapter 1: A Day in the Capital
- Written by: Tappei Nagatsuki
- Illustrated by: Daichi Matsuse
- Published by: Media Factory
- English publisher: NA: Yen Press
- Magazine: Monthly Comic Alive
- Original run: June 27, 2014 – February 27, 2015
- Volumes: 2
- Manga

Chapter 2: One Week at the Mansion
- Written by: Tappei Nagatsuki
- Illustrated by: Makoto Fūgetsu
- Published by: Square Enix
- English publisher: NA: Yen Press
- Magazine: Monthly Big Gangan
- Original run: October 25, 2014 – January 25, 2017
- Volumes: 5
- Manga

Chapter 3: Truth of Zero
- Written by: Tappei Nagatsuki
- Illustrated by: Daichi Matsuse
- Published by: Media Factory
- English publisher: NA: Yen Press
- Magazine: Monthly Comic Alive
- Original run: May 27, 2015 – September 27, 2019
- Volumes: 11
- Manga

Chapter 4: The Sanctuary and the Witch of Greed
- Written by: Tappei Nagatsuki
- Illustrated by: Haruna Atori
- Published by: Media Factory
- English publisher: NA: Yen Press
- Magazine: Monthly Comic Alive
- Original run: September 27, 2019 – present
- Volumes: 14
- Manga

Chapter 5: Stars that Engrave History
- Written by: Tappei Nagatsuki
- Illustrated by: Wakaya Takase
- Published by: Media Factory
- Magazine: Comic Alive+
- Original run: February 19, 2024 – present
- Volumes: 3
- Anime television series
- Re:Zero (2016–present)
- Video games
- Re:Zero − Starting Life in Another World: Death or Kiss (2017); Re:Zero − Starting Life in Another World: Infinity (2020); Re:Zero − Starting Life in Another World: Lost in Memories (2020); Re:Zero − Starting Life in Another World: The Prophecy of the Throne (2021); Re:Zero − Starting Life in Another World: Forbidden Book and the Mysterious Spirit (2021); Re:Zero − Starting Life in Another World: Witch's Re:surrection (2024)
- icon

Re:Zero − Starting Life in Another World (Japanese: Re:ゼロから始める異世界生活, Hepburn: Ri:Zero kara Hajimeru Isekai Seikatsu), often referred to simply as Re:Zero and also known less commonly as Re: Life in a Different World from Zero, (Note: Stylized in sentence case; this alternative English title is featured on the covers of the Japanese version of the light novels.) is a Japanese light novel series written by Tappei Nagatsuki and illustrated by Shinichirou Otsuka. It started serialization as a web novel on the user-generated website Shōsetsuka ni Narō in 2012. 46 light novels, as well as six side story volumes and fourteen short story collections have been published by Media Factory under their MF Bunko J imprint. The story centers on Subaru Natsuki, a hikikomori who suddenly finds himself transported to another world while on his way home from a convenience store.

The series' first four arcs have been adapted into separate manga series. The first, by Daichi Matsue, was published between June 2014 and March 2015. The second, by Makoto Fugetsu, has been published by Square Enix between October 2014 and January 2017. The third, also by Matsue, was also published between May 2015 and September 2019. The fourth, by Haruno Atori, with composition by Yu Aikawa, has been published since September 2019. Additionally, Media Factory has published two anthology manga with stories by different artists. In March 2017, game developer 5pb. released a visual novel based on the light novels.

An anime television series adaptation produced by White Fox aired from April to September 2016, starting with an hour-long first episode. Two original video animations (OVAs) were released in October 2018 and November 2019. A second season aired in a split-cours format, with the first half airing from July to September 2020, and the second half airing from January to March 2021. A third season also premiered in a split-cours format, with the first half airing from October to November 2024, and the second half airing from February to March 2025. A fourth season aired from April to September 2026. A fifth season has been announced.

The novels and all three manga adaptations are published in North America by Yen Press. The overall series (light novel and manga volumes) had over 13 million copies in circulation by March 2023 (including digital versions), while the anime series has sold more than 70,000 copies on home video. The light novels have been praised for their fresh take on the "another world" (isekai) concept, fleshed-out characters, complex world and lore, and thought-provoking topics and themes.

== Premise ==
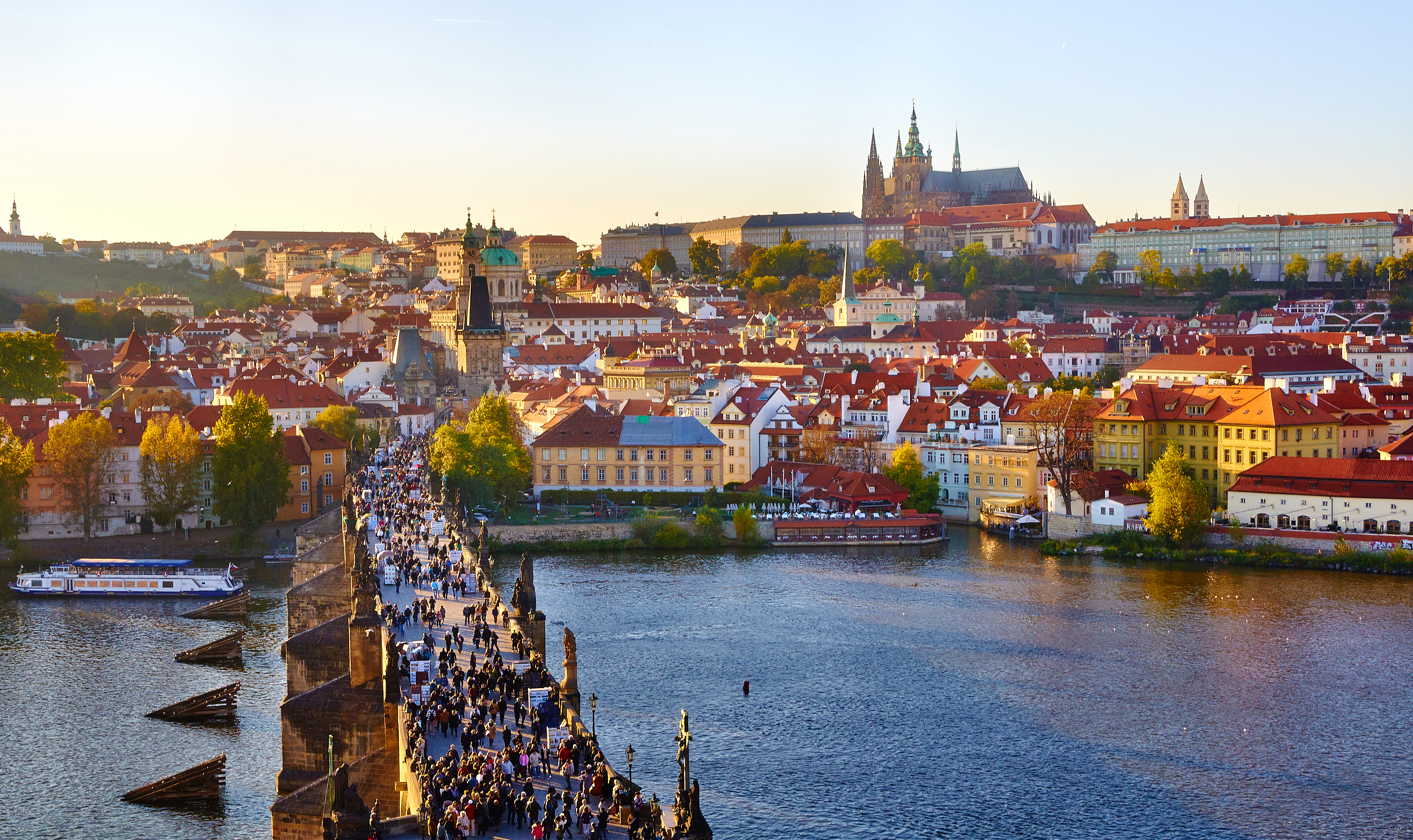
The Kingdom of Lugunica was modelled after Prague

Subaru Natsuki is a NEET who is suddenly summoned to a fantasy-like world. Just after arriving, he is killed while trying to help a young half-elf he befriends, Emilia, who is a candidate to become the next ruler of the Kingdom of Lugunica, only to revive some hours in the past. After dying a few times, Subaru realizes that he has the power to turn back time after his death. After successfully helping Emilia, Subaru starts living in one of the Mansions of Roswaal L. Mathers as a butler. Out of gratitude and affection for Emilia, Subaru makes use of his newfound ability to protect her and help on her ambition to be successfully appointed as the next queen, also providing assistance to other friends he makes along the way, while suffering due to the pain inflicted on him every time he dies, and carrying along the memories of everything that happened before his power activates, which is forgotten by everybody except for him.

Although Subaru is at first only devoted to supporting Emilia, the appearance of the Witch Cult who represent seven deadly sins forces him to fight against them in each "arc" the novel is divided into. As Subaru's relationship with Emilia improves, the protagonist becomes concerned about allies whose memories he can only remember and searches for methods to recover them. He obtains multiple close allies like Garfiel and Otto who force him to depend on others.

== Production ==
=== Writing ===
In the late 2000s, the light novel series The Familiar of Zero (Zero no Tsukaima) inspired numerous fan fiction works on the website Shōsetsuka ni Narō ("Let's Become Novelists"), commonly referred to as Narō. Tappei Nagatsuki initially wrote The Familiar of Zero fan fiction on Narō before adapting its isekai ("other world") premise to create his own original web novel series, Re:Zero, which began serialization on Narō in 2012.

The series' editor at MF Bunko J, Masahito Ikemoto, first became aware of the web novel in April 2013, when it began appearing on his Twitter feed. He was immediately struck by the series' use of Return by Death, describing it as a "depressing, yet surprising, twist on the fantasy genre", and subsequently collaborated with Nagatsuki to adapt the series into a light novel. Although most light novels are approximately 250 pages in length, Nagatsuki submitted a manuscript exceeding 1,000 pages for the first volume, requiring extensive editing by Ikemoto. Nagatsuki had intended to incorporate worldbuilding early in the narrative, but Ikemoto argued that engaging readers with the characters should take priority. Consequently, he restructured the story so that the world and lore elements were deferred until the third arc of the series.

Re:Zero originated from Nagatsuki's desire to write the heroine Emilia. He expressed a particular fondness for silver-haired heroines to the extent that he considered Emilia his favorite character in the entire series, as Subaru's journey to protect her constitutes the core of the narrative. Subaru's given name was conceived as a reference to the Pleiades asterism, which in turn connects to the Seven Sisters of Greek mythology. Nagatsuki found it difficult to write the story during a segment in which Subaru is unable to use his Return by Death ability and becomes surrounded by enemies.

Although Subaru dies multiple times throughout the series, Nagatsuki identified the scene in which he is devoured by rabbits as the most gruesome, and stated that nothing more frightening would occur in the novels. The scene was inspired by the 1997 film The Lost World: Jurassic Park, in which Compsognathus dinosaurs consume the character Dieter Stark. Nagatsuki noted that he appreciated the fear conveyed in the Jurassic Park franchise through depictions of small creatures consuming humans. Despite considering the rabbit scene the most harrowing death, Nagatsuki continued to devise surprising ways for Subaru to perish in each arc of the novels.

=== Art ===
Early concept art for the characters Subaru and Emilia

Before joining Re:Zero, illustrator Shinichirou Otsuka had worked on video games, which led him to prioritize drawing backgrounds when illustrating the series. After reading the web novel, he submitted preliminary character designs for the main characters to Ikemoto.

Otsuka incorporated character data provided by Nagatsuki but also added extra features according to his own preferences. He favored Emilia's regular outfit, despite her frequent costume changes in the story. He also felt pressure when designing her, both because she was the main heroine and because of the extensive data Nagatsuki supplied. When creating characters, he tailored their clothing to suit their personalities. Otsuka estimated that he had designed over 200 characters, including those from side stories beyond the main novels. He avoided reusing old designs and intended to broaden his inspiration by exposing himself to a wider variety of media. For settings, the Royal Capital of Lugunica was modeled on the city of Prague.

Subaru's initial design made him resemble a delinquent, with Otsuka later describing it as "not the face of a boy in his teens"; Ikemoto consequently requested that the character appear "more friendly and less fierce" to enable audience empathy during emotional scenes. Given that Subaru was conceived as an ordinary teenager, Otsuka avoided giving him an ikemen style, which emphasizes stylishness. Emilia's original design was considered extremely plain, so multiple features were added to increase her visual interest. Ikemoto specified that she had to conform to the "archetypal heroine" mold. Ram and Rem also underwent significant revisions from the first draft: their original designs lacked the characteristic hair parts, and their maid uniforms were longer and more "traditional". Otsuka also worked on the series' video game and expressed concern about seeing his artwork animated, owing to the difficulty of rendering such detailed designs in motion. Among his favorite characters was Beatrice, though he also showed interest in the handling of Rem.

== Media ==
=== Web novel ===
The Re:Zero web novel was initially serialized by Tappei Nagatsuki (writing under the username Nezumi-iro Neko (鼠色猫, "Gray Cat")) on the user-generated content site Shōsetsuka ni Narō from April 20, 2012, onwards. As of May 25, 2026, nine story arcs have been completed and six "EX" side stories have been published, with the tenth arc in progress. In total the webnovel has 782 chapters available.

=== Light novels ===
Following the web novel's publication, Media Factory acquired the series for print publication. The first light novel volume, with illustrations by Shin'ichirō Ōtsuka, was published on January 24, 2014, under their MF Bunko J imprint. As of September 2026, 46 volumes have been published, as well as six side story volumes and fourteen short story collections. Nagatsuki and Otsuka began publishing a series of short side-stories focusing on characters from the series in Monthly Comic Alive, starting with the character Elsa in August 2016. It was followed with one focused on Petra Leyte on November 26, 2016, and one featuring Ram and Rem on January 27, 2017. The light novels are published in English by Yen Press, who announced their acquisition of the license via Twitter on December 2, 2015. The publisher has also acquired the license to the Re:Zero EX side novels.

=== Manga ===
A manga adaptation by Daichi Matsue, titled Re:ZERO: -Starting Life in Another World- Chapter 1: A Day in the Capital (Ｒｅ：ゼロから始める異世界生活 第一章 王都の一日編, Ri: Zero Kara Hajimeru Isekai Seikatsu Dai-Ichi-Shō: Ōto no Ichinichi-hen), began serialization in the August 2014 issue of Media Factory's seinen manga magazine Monthly Comic Alive on June 27, 2014. The final volume was released on March 23, 2015. On December 2, 2015, Yen Press announced that they had licensed the series.

A second manga, titled Re:Zero -Starting Life in Another World-, Chapter 2: One Week at the Mansion (Re：ゼロから始める異世界生活 第二章 屋敷の一週間編, Ri: Zero Kara Hajimeru Isekai Seikatsu Dai-Ni-Shō: Yashiki no Ishūkan-hen), with art by Makoto Fugetsu, began serialization in Square Enix's seinen magazine Monthly Big Gangan on October 25, 2014. The final chapter was published on December 24, 2016, and an extra chapter was published on January 25, 2017. The second adaptation has also been licensed by Yen Press.

A third manga by Matsuse, titled Re:Zero -Starting Life in Another World-, Chapter 3: Truth of Zero (Re:ゼロから始める異世界生活 第三章 Truth of Zero, Ri: Zero Kara Hajimeru Isekai Seikatsu Dai-San-Shō: Truth of Zero) began serialization in Comic Alive's July 2015 issue on May 27, 2015. The final chapter was published on September 27, 2019. Yen Press also publishes the third adaptation.

A fourth manga, titled Re:Zero -Starting Life in Another World- Chapter 4: The Sanctuary and the Witch of Greed (Re:ゼロから始める異世界生活 第四章 聖域と強欲の魔女), with art by Haruno Atori and composition by Yu Aikawa began serialization in Comic Alive's November 2019 issue on September 27, 2019.

A fifth manga, titled Re:Zero -Starting Life in Another World- Chapter 5: Stars that Engrave History began serialization under the Comic Alive+ label on the ComicWalker website on February 19, 2024.

A manga anthology, titled Re:Zero -Starting Life in Another World- Official Anthology Comic (Re:ゼロから始める異世界生活 公式アンソロジーコミック, Ri:Zero kara Hajimeru Isekai Seikatsu Kōshiki Ansorojī Komikku), was published by Media Factory on June 23, 2016. A second anthology was published on September 23, 2017. A third volume was released on March 23, 2018.

A manga adaptation of the novel Re:Zero Prequel: The Frozen Bond (Re：ゼロから始める前日譚 氷結の絆), released with the Season 1 Blu-rays, was illustrated by Minori Tsukahara and released from 2020 to 2021. It was licensed by Yen Press.

=== Internet radio show ===
An Internet radio show to promote the series, named Re: Radio life in a different world from zero (Re：ゼロから始める異世界ラジオ生活), began broadcasting on March 27, 2016. The show was aired every Monday and was hosted by Rie Takahashi, the voice actress for Emilia. Guests that appeared on the show included Yūsuke Kobayashi (Subaru Natsuki), Inori Minase (Rem), Yumi Uchiyama (Puck), Rie Murakawa (Ram), Satomi Arai (Beatrice), Chinatsu Akasaki (Felt), Kana Ueda (Anastasia Hoshin), and Yui Horie (Felix). The series ran for 33 episodes and concluded on December 19, 2016. The first radio CD, which contains episodes 1–8 of the show, was released on June 27, 2016. The second, which contains episodes 9–16 of the show, was released on September 28, 2016. The third, containing episodes 17–24, was released on November 30, 2016, and the fourth, containing episodes 25–33, was released on March 29, 2017.

=== Anime ===
An anime television series adaptation was announced by Kadokawa in July 2015. The series is directed by Masaharu Watanabe and written by Masahiro Yokotani, with animation by the studio White Fox. Kyuta Sakai is serving as both character designer and as chief animation director. Music for the series is composed by Kenichiro Suehiro. Kentaro Minegishi is the series' director of photography, and Yoshito Takamine serves as art director. Jin Aketagawa handled sound direction for the anime, and sound effects were produced by Yuji Furuya. Other staff members include Hitomi Sudo (editing), Yu Karube (3D director), Saaya Kinjō (art configuration), Izumi Sakamoto (color design), and Noritaka Suzuki and Gōichi Iwabatake (prop design).

The series also became part of Isekai Quartet, a crossover comedy series with characters drawn in a chibi style, which also features characters from other Kadokawa Corporation's light novel franchises, including KonoSuba, Overlord, and The Saga of Tanya the Evil.

=== Video games ===
Cover art for the PlayStation 4 release of the first visual novel

In August 2016, game developer 5pb. announced that they were developing a visual novel based on the series, titled Re:Zero − Starting Life in Another World: Death or Kiss (Re:ゼロから始める異世界生活 -DEATH OR KISS-, Re:Zero kara Hajimeru Isekai Seikatsu -Death or Kiss-). The game follows an original story that differs from the light novel and the anime, and allows the player to choose between routes featuring Emilia, Rem, Ram, Felt, Beatrice, Crusch, Priscilla, or Anastasia. A DLC allows players who pre-ordered the game to replace the character's costumes with swimsuits. The opening theme, "yell! magic starts with a kiss" (yell！～くちびるからはじまる魔法～, Yell! Kuchibiru kara Hajimaru Mahō), was performed by Suzuki, who sung the anime's first opening theme, while the ending theme, "Dai Dai Daisuki" (ダイ・ダイ・ダイスキ), was performed by Minase and Murakawa. The game has received a generally positive score of 30/40 on Famitsu.

In Japan, the game was originally scheduled to be released for PlayStation 4 and PlayStation Vita on March 23, 2017, but was delayed to March 30, 2017, due to certain circumstances. The limited edition of the game came with a soundtrack CD and either a Ram (for the PS4 version) or Rem (for the PSVita version) SD figure.

A virtual reality app that allows the user to interact with the character Rem was released for iOS and Android on May 26, 2017. A version featuring the character Emilia was released on June 6, 2017. The game was later ported to both PC and to the PlayStation VR.

A role-playing mobile game called Re:Zero − Starting Life in Another World: Infinity that was made by Tianjin Tianxiang Interactive Technology and authorized by White Fox was released on January 14, 2020, in China. Another mobile game that made by Sega titled Re:Zero − Starting Life in Another World: Lost in Memories (Re:ゼロから始める異世界生活 Lost in Memories, Ri:Zero kara Hajimeru Isekai Seikatsu Lost in Memories) was released for Android and iOS on September 9, 2020. In the game, the player can become protagonist Subaru Natsuki and relive the story of the anime. From there, the player can branch into "What If" stories. Furthermore, a new story original to the game was produced under the full supervision of original author Tappei Nagatsuki.

A tactical adventure video game was developed by Chime and published by Spike Chunsoft titled Re:Zero − Starting Life in Another World: The Prophecy of the Throne (Re:ゼロから始める異世界生活 偽りの王選候補, Ri:Zero kara Hajimeru Isekai Seikatsu Tsuwarino-ō-Sen kōho) and was released for PlayStation 4, PC, and Nintendo Switch in January 2021. The game has an original story and was produced under the full supervision of original author Tappei Nagatsuki and illustrated by the series' illustrator Shinichiou Otsuka. It is the first official Re:Zero game to have an English release.

A role-playing browser game called Re:Zero -Starting Life in Another World- Forbidden Book and the Mysterious Spirit that was made by DMM Games released on July 14, 2021, in Japan. On March 14, 2022, DMM Games has announced the game will be shut down on July 14, 2022.

A mobile game called Re:Zero − Starting Life in Another World: Witch's Re:surrection was announced at the series' stage in AnimeJapan 2023. It was released for iOS and Android on August 26, 2024, and ended service on May 30, 2025.

=== Other media ===
Kadokawa published a 272-page guide to the series' first three arcs, titled Re:zeropedia, alongside the 10th volume of the novels on October 24, 2016. An official dōjinshi art book was published at Comiket, with art by Ponkan 8 (Shirobako and My Youth Romantic Comedy Is Wrong, As I Expected), Yuka Nakajima (Listen to Me, Girls. I Am Your Father!, Amagi Brilliant Park), and TakayaKi (Arifureta Shokugyou de Sekai Saikyou). A crossover with Natsume Akatsuki's light novel series KonoSuba, titled Re:Starting Life Blessing This World was published on December 21, 2016. The book featured interviews with each series' authors and illustrators, as well as the principal voice actors in their respective anime adaptations. A one-shot crossover manga by Daichi Matsuse and Masahito Watari (illustrator of the KonoSuba manga adaptation) was also included. A fanbook containing commentary on the episodes of the anime, as well as the collected Animate Times cast and staff interviews, was published on December 31, 2016. Bushiroad released a Booster Pack set and Trial Deck+ of Re:ZERO -Starting Life in Another World- for Weiß Schwarz on December 28, 2018.

== Reception ==
=== Sales and popularity ===
According to Japanese light novel news website LN News, the series had 1 million copies in print by June 2016; over 2 million by September of the same year; and over 3.1 million by May 2017. It had over 11 million copies in circulation by January 2022. The overall series (light novel and manga adaptations volumes) had over 13 million copies in circulation by March 2023 (including digital versions). The light novel series was the tenth best-selling light novel series in Japan between November 2015 and May 2016, selling 263,357 copies. During that period, the first and second volumes were the 35th and 48th best-selling light novel volumes, selling 49,194 and 41,617 copies, respectively. The series was the fourth best-selling series in 2016, selling 1,007,381 copies between November 2015 and November 2016. Its first three volumes were the fourteenth, 21st, and 30th best selling volumes of the year, selling 155,363, 127,970, and 110,574 copies, respectively. In 2017, the series was the third best-selling series, with 925,671 copies sold. Its first, tenth, eleventh, and twelfth volumes respectively ranked nineteenth (60,135 copies), 25th (56,001 copies), seventh (101,480 copies), and twelfth (79,431 copies) in the period between November 2016 and May 2017. In 2019, the series sold 550,202 copies.

The light novels and the anime both took first place in their respective categories in the 2017 Sugoi Japan Awards.

In a survey of (primarily female) Otamart users, the series was ranked second on a list of the most successful media franchises of 2016.

=== Critical reception ===
Theron Martin of Anime News Network reviewed the first book, praising it for being a somewhat fresher take on the "transported to another world" concept, but leveled criticism at it for bumpy and awkwardly timed dialogue and a tendency for redundancy. In the following volume, Rebecca Silverman commended Subaru’s use of Return by Death as a means of protecting those he cares for. Anime UK News similarly found Subaru's ability intriguing, despite describing the novel's premise as generic, and praised Shinichirou Otsuka's illustrations. In a separate analysis focused on Subaru, Manga.Tokyo contrasted the light novel and anime adaptations in their portrayal of his suicide to undo Rem's death; the anime's direction was commended for depicting Subaru's psychological state and for presenting the act with greater realism than the original printed version.

In a major analysis of the series, Manga News observed that the author explores the concept of the isekai genre more extensively than other works that draw from video game, fantasy, or virtual reality tropes. The time-loop mechanism in Re:Zero invokes parallels with films such as Groundhog Day and All You Need Is Kill. The combination of these two elements, according to the review, grants Re:Zero a distinct identity and a degree of originality that enhances its narrative appeal. Another notable feature is the reversible death mechanic, which functions similarly to a checkpoint or save system in video games, particularly as Subaru requires multiple iterations to fully comprehend his situation. Initially dismissing his first death as a dream, he approaches his second day with lessons drawn from that perceived reverie, aiming to avoid prior errors. Only during the fourth loop, after reliving the same day on four separate occasions, does he become fully cognizant of his circumstances and act decisively to accomplish his objectives. Once aware of his unique ability, Subaru resolves to employ it judiciously. In the book Mitos y Pantallas, the series is characterized as a modern reinterpretation of Greek mythology, with Subaru likened to Sisyphus; both figures circumvent death, yet the isekai protagonist does not pursue suffering but rather strives to persevere. Subaru's abilities and psychological condition have also been associated with the concept of Thanatophobia as articulated by Sigmund Freud, a notion itself rooted in the Greek mythological figure Thanatos.
