= Tappei Nagatsuki =

Japanese novelist

- 長月達平
- Born: March 11, 1987 (age 39)
- Other names: Nezumi-iro Neko (鼠色猫, "Mouse-Colored Cat")
- Occupation: Novelist
- Notable work: Re:Zero

Tappei Nagatsuki (長月達平) is a Japanese novelist. He is the author of the light novel series Re:Zero. The series has been adapted into an anime. He initially serialized the series as a web novel (writing under the username Nezumi-iro Neko (鼠色猫, "Mouse-Colored Cat")) on the user-generated content site Shōsetsuka ni Narō from April 20, 2012, onwards. As of April 1, 2026, he has published thirty eight novels and five side stories, comprising a total of 686 chapters. Following the web novel's publication, Media Factory acquired the series for print publication. As of December 2025, forty three volumes have been published, as well as six side story volumes and thirteen short story collections. The series adapted into anime, manga and visual novel. Nagatsuki was very active in the production of the anime, attending script meetings, recording sessions, and dubbing.

== Works ==
List of Nagatsuki's major works
Title	Year	Notes
Re:Zero − Starting Life in Another World (novels)	2012–ongoing (web novel); 2014–ongoing (print)	Published by Media Factory, 43 volumes released
Warlords of Sigrdrifa Rusalka (novels)	2020	
Senyoku no Sigrdrifa Sakura (novels)	2020	
Warlords of Sigrdrifa (anime)	2020	Series composition, screenplay
Re:Zero − Starting Life in Another World: The Prophecy of the Throne (video game)	2021	Scenario supervisor
Vivy: Fluorite Eye's Song	2021	Creator, screenwriter
Vivy Prototype (novel)	2021	
Suicide Squad Isekai	2024	Script supervisor, screenwriter
Re:Zero – Starting Life in Another World: Witch's Re:surrection (video game)	2024–2025	Scenario supervisor
