= Alderaan (disambiguation) =

Alderaan may refer to:

- Alderaan, a fictional planet in the Star Wars universe
- Alderaan (astronomy), a former name for a group of stars in the constellation of Gemini

Alderaan may also refer to:

- Alderan, a character in the Hungarian epic poem The Siege of Sziget
- the fictional Aldaran family in the Darkover series of books

== See also ==
- Aldebaran (disambiguation), a star in the constellation of Taurus
- Alderano, a given name
