= Re:Zero season 2 =

Second season of anime television series

Re:Zero − Starting Life in Another World
- Season 2
- Cover art for the first home media volume of the second season, featuring Echidna
- No. of episodes: 25

Release
- Original network: AT-X
- Original release: July 8, 2020 – March 24, 2021

Season chronology
- ← Previous; Season 1 Next → Season 3

Re:Zero − Starting Life in Another World is an anime television series based on the light novel series Re:Zero − Starting Life in Another World written by Tappei Nagatsuki and illustrated by Shinichirou Otsuka. In March 2019, it was announced that a second season of the anime series was in production. The cast and staff reprised their roles for the second season. It was originally scheduled to premiere in April 2020, but was delayed to July 2020 due to production complications caused by the COVID-19 pandemic. The season aired in two split cours, with the first half premiering on July 8, 2020, and the second half premiering on January 6, 2021. The season adapts "Arc 4" of the series (volumes 10–15 of the light novel).

For the first cours, the opening theme song is "Realize", performed by Konomi Suzuki, while the ending theme song is "Memento", performed by Nonoc. For the second cours, the opening theme song is "Long Shot", performed by Mayu Maeshima, while the ending theme song is "Believe in You", performed by Nonoc.

== Episodes ==
=== Part 1 ===
No. overall	No. in season	Title	Directed by	Written by	Storyboarded by	Original release date
26	1	"Each One's Promise"; Transliteration: "Sorezore no Chikai" (Japanese: それぞれの誓い)	Masaharu Watanabe & Naoko Takeichi	Masahiro Yokotani	Masaharu Watanabe	July 8, 2020
After the battle with the Witch Cult, Subaru travels back to Crusch's manor with Emilia, when he discovers, to his horror, that everyone has forgotten Rem. Earlier, she and Crusch were ambushed by the Sin Archbishops of Gluttony, Lye Batenkaitos, and Greed, Regulus Corneus. Although they fought fiercely, both ended up having their existences eaten by Lye. This caused Rem to fall into a coma, with no one but Subaru remembering her, and Crusch losing her memories. After learning what happened, a devastated Subaru commits suicide in hopes of going back in time to before the ambush to prevent it. However, it fails as he returns to after the ambush had already occurred. Subaru later attends a meeting with Emilia, the amnesiac Crusch, Felix and Wilhelm. After a heated discussion, they decide to continue their alliance. After the meeting, Emilia comforts Subaru as he grieves for Rem.
27	2	"The Next Location"; Transliteration: "Tsuginaru Basho" (Japanese: 次なる場所)	Hiroyuki Tsuchiya	Yoshiko Nakamura	Masayuki Kojima	July 15, 2020
Subaru and Emilia return to Roswaal's manor with Otto and the comatose Rem. There they meet Frederica Baumann, an ex-maid who returned at Ram's request, and Petra Leyte, an Arlam villager who just started as an apprentice. While Frederica fills in Emilia, Subaru seeks out Beatrice for questions he has regarding Petelgeuse's gospel. However, she tells him to go to a place called the Sanctuary for the answers; Frederica reveals that Roswaal is also currently there with Ram and the evacuated Arlam villagers. Emilia, Subaru, and Otto thus decide to head to the Sanctuary. Frederica explains it is surrounded by a barrier that locks it off from the outside world and gives Emilia a crystal to open it. As they enter the Sanctuary, the crystal lights up and Emilia falls unconscious, causing Subaru to grab it off her. He is then transported to the middle of a forest where he finds an elf girl who immediately flees. Subaru gives chase but loses track of her at a ruin. Heading inside, Subaru once again finds himself transported, this time to an open plain where he meets a woman who introduces herself as the Witch of Greed: Echidna.
28	3	"The Long-Awaited Reunion"; Transliteration: "Machikaneta Saikai" (Japanese: 待ちかねた再会)	Kenichi Kawamura	Eiji Umehara	Kenichi Kawamura	July 22, 2020
Subaru learns that he's in a mental space that houses Echidna's soul before she invites him for tea. However, after probing each other for information for a while, he eventually recalls his objective and leaves. Waking up back at the ruin, he is then attacked by the Sanctuary's Guardian, Garfiel Tinzel, until he mentions Frederica, causing him to stop. Subaru meets up with the others and Garfiel escorts them to Roswaal and Ram. Roswaal reveals that the Sanctuary's barrier keeps half-breeds in, including Emilia, and that the only way to break it is to pass a trial; Roswaal attempted it but was rejected due to him not being a half-breed. Garfiel then reveals that the Sanctuary's inhabitants have taken the Arlam villagers hostage and demand Emilia take the trial, which she agrees to. That evening, Emilia takes the trial at the ruin, but Subaru follows her when something seems wrong. Having been allowed to partake in the trial by Echidna, Subaru collapses once inside and inexplicably wakes up to find himself back in Japan.
29	4	"Parent and Child"; Transliteration: "Oyako" (Japanese: 親子)	Yoshito Mikamo	Yoshiko Nakamura	Masaharu Watanabe	July 29, 2020
Subaru finds himself back in Japan without his memories of Lugunica, causing him to revert into a Hikikomori. Every day his father, Kenichi, and mother, Naoko, try to encourage him to go back to school, but to no avail. Something is different this time, however, as Subaru finds himself having headaches whenever he tries to run from his problems. Seeing something is off, Kenichi takes his son for a walk. The headaches are eventually revealed to be Subaru's suppressed memories, and, after recalling everything, he comes clean to his father; growing up, Subaru was always compared to his father but found himself unable to live up to that image, leaving him without an identity of his own. Subaru tells his father that he wanted him to abandon him but also assures him that he has finally found people who accept him, and the two reconcile. The next day, Subaru prepares to go to school and his mother wishes him well, which saddens him as he has deduced that this world is an illusion and that he will likely never see his parents again. Subaru then goes to school, where he finds Echidna waiting for him.
30	5	"A Step Forward"; Transliteration: "Fumidashita Ippo" (Japanese: 踏み出した一歩)	Baito Akai	Masahiro Yokotani	Tomoyuki Kurokawa	August 5, 2020
Echidna congratulates Subaru on clearing the first trial, overcoming his past, and reveals that there are two more. He then wakes up next to Emilia back at the ruin as she suffers a mental breakdown, having failed her own trial. He takes her back to their residence in the Sanctuary where he, Otto, and Garfiel try to think of a way to get around the barrier only to be told by the elf girl Subaru encountered earlier, the Sanctuary's elder Ryuzu, that clearing the trials is the only way. The next day, Emilia once again tries and fails to clear her trial whilst Puck has been mysteriously absent ever since they arrived at the Sanctuary. Subaru later has a talk with Roswaal and is angered when the latter claims his inaction regarding the Witch Cult was because he wanted the former to take the credit. Several days later, Subaru convinces the Sanctuary residents to let the Arlam Villagers go while Emilia stays behind to clear the trials. During the ride back, Garfiel suggests to Subaru that the latter could complete the trials in Emilia's place to avoid watching her suffer. Upon returning to Roswaal's Mansion, however, Subaru finds it deserted before suddenly being stabbed in the gut by Elsa Granhiert.
31	6	"The Maiden's Gospel"; Transliteration: "Shōjo no Fukuin" (Japanese: 少女の福音)	Kazuhiro Ozawa	Eiji Umehara	Kazuhiro Ozawa	August 12, 2020
Respawning back in the Sanctuary graveyard, Subaru once again comforts the crying Emilia, and proposes the idea of completing the other trials himself. In sharp contrast with the previous timeline, this is met with disgust from Garfiel and disappointment from Emilia, who thinks he doesn't trust her. Subaru confides in Roswaal his plan to head back to the mansion early to check in with Frederica; Roswaal volunteers Ram to join him. On the road, Ram starts to have vague memories about past events, leading Subaru to tell her about Rem. Upon arrival, Subaru escorts Ram to Rem, then tries to pry information out of Frederica about why she gave them the teleporting stone. Frederica refuses to reveal anything however due to her oath. Elsa suddenly appears, holding Petra hostage, forcing the three to save her and make their escape. Frederica transforms into a beast to fight Elsa, while the others go to rescue Rem, only to be attacked by a surprise Mabeast. Eventually, everyone except Subaru is killed, when he's confronted by Elsa. He tries to get her to say who sent her, but she only gives vague hints. As she's about to kill him, he jumps into Rem's room to protect her, only to end up in Beatrice's instead, reacting in sheer terror.
32	7	"Friend"; Transliteration: "Yūjin" (Japanese: ユージン)	Hiroyuki Tsuchiya	Yoshiko Nakamura	Hiroyuki Shimazu	August 19, 2020
Subaru is angry at Beatrice for only saving him and attempts suicide so he can restart, but she stops him. He then notices that she has what appears to be a Witch Cult Gospel and questions her until she snaps, claiming everything she did for him was under the book's orders. Elsa then finds them and kills Subaru. After respawning, Subaru once again plans to take the trial in Emilia's stead and proposes his plan in a private talk with Garfiel and Ryuzu. However, due to the miasma around him having increased from recent respawns, they believe him to be a Witch Cultist and take him captive. During his captivity, Subaru ponders over all the events that have led up to the current situation. Fortunately, Otto finds him three days later and reveals that he and Ram have an escape plan. While Subaru questions his motives for helping him, Otto admits it is because they are "friends".
33	8	"The Value of Life"; Transliteration: "Inochi no Kachi" (Japanese: 命の価値)	Baito Akai	Eiji Umehara	Kenichi Kawamura	August 26, 2020
Despite Otto and Ram insisting they flee, Subaru decides to first confront Roswaal about Beatrice. Roswaal reveals that what Beatrice has is not a gospel but one of two Tomes of Wisdom, books that tell the readers their future, and that Subaru need only tell her that he is "that person", much to his confusion. Garfiel then finds them, forcing Subaru to flee on his land dragon, Patrasche. While Ram holds off Garfiel, Otto and the Arlam villagers help Subaru flee. However, Garfiel soon catches up to Subaru after killing them all. Subaru makes it across the barrier but is then teleported by Frederica's crystal and falls unconscious. Waking up back at the Sanctuary sometime later, Subaru finds it abandoned and frozen over before being ambushed and devoured by a horde of rabbit Mabeasts. After respawning, Subaru is traumatized from being eaten alive until Echidna confronts him. She then reveals that she knows about Return By Death and that Subaru can freely speak about it in her space. Upon confirming this, Subaru breaks down, finally able to talk about everything he's been through, while Echidna comforts him.
34	9	"Love Love Love Love Love Love You"; Transliteration: "Rabu Rabu Rabu Rabu Rabu Rabu Yū" (Japanese: らぶらぶらぶらぶらぶらぶゆー)	Hiroyuki Tsuchiya	Eiji Umehara	Masayuki Sakoi	September 2, 2020
Echidna concludes the rabbit Mabeasts to be the Great Rabbit, one of the Three Great Mabeasts created by the Witch of Gluttony, Daphne; another being the defeated White Whale. She then reveals that the other Witches of Sin also inhabit her space, offering Subaru an audience with Daphne. However, he is instead confronted by the Witch of Pride, Typhon, who shatters his body using her power "to punish those who consider themselves guilty" to see if he is a "sinner". Fortunately, the Witch of Wrath, Minerva, heals him before he finally meets Daphne. While they mostly argue in circles, she does reveal that the Rabbit is attracted to strong magic. Having learned everything he could, Subaru takes his leave. After waking, he goes outside to find the Sanctuary covered in a layer of shadows. He realizes that as punishment for repeatedly talking about Return By Death, Satella emerged and killed nearly everyone at the Sanctuary. She then starts devouring Subaru with her miasma but Garfiel saves him. Elsewhere, Roswaal is being devoured by the miasma and comments to himself that Subaru will have to try harder "next time".
35	10	"I Know Hell"; Transliteration: "Jigoku nara Shitte iru" (Japanese: 地獄なら知っている)	Yoshito Mikamo	Masahiro Yokotani	Hiroyuki Shimazu	September 9, 2020
Garfiel launches a counter-attack against Satella with an army of Ryuzu clones, but it fails and he is killed. She then begins driving Subaru mad with her miasma, but he escapes by committing suicide. After respawning, Subaru worries for Emilia and is happy that she is still herself. Subaru later slips away to explore the Sanctuary and discovers an abandoned lab where he finds the original Ryuzu Meyer in suspended animation. He is then confronted by the village elder Ryuzu, who explains that Echidna created her and the other clones as part of an immortality experiment. She also reveals that having met Echidna makes Subaru an "Apostle of Greed", giving him command over them. After this, Subaru has a heart-to-heart with Emilia and convinces her to depend on him. The next morning, Subaru leaves early for the mansion but is stopped by Garfiel. However, having learned from Echidna that Return By Death's lives are infinite, he isn't scared and has him back off. Upon reaching the mansion, Subaru quickly has Frederica and Petra take Rem and evacuate before confronting Beatrice.
36	11	"The Taste of Death"; Transliteration: "Shi no Aji" (Japanese: 死の味)	Kazuhiro Ozawa & Baito Akai	Yoshiko Nakamura	Kazuhiro Ozawa	September 16, 2020
Subaru takes the Tome of Wisdom from Beatrice only to find it blank and she reveals that she is under a contract to wait for "that person" who will euthanase her. However, their argument is interrupted by Elsa's arrival. Subaru takes Beatrice and flees but is intercepted by the Mabeast tamer, Meili Portroute, who has already killed the others. Beatrice fights and seemingly kills Elsa but she somehow revives and stabs her in the back. Before Beatrice dies, she uses Frederica's crystal to teleport Subaru back to Sanctuary. Upon arrival, Subaru finds it is snowing and that Emilia has gone insane from repeatedly failing the trial. He is then confronted by Garfiel, who demands Emilia stop the snow, but Subaru deduces that this is Roswaal's doing and they confront him. Roswaal proceeds to kill Garfiel and Ram before revealing himself as owning the second Tome of Wisdom. He knows Subaru has been time-looping. The Great Rabbit then attacks and Roswaal lets them kill him while Subaru survives long enough to reach Emilia and die in her arms.
37	12	"The Witches' Tea Party"; Transliteration: "Majo-tachi no Chakai" (Japanese: 魔女たちの茶会)	Hiroyuki Tsuchiya	Masahiro Yokotani	Masaharu Watanabe	September 23, 2020
After respawning, Subaru finds himself at wit's end and decides to consult Echidna. However, he is instead put through the second trial, in which he faces scenarios where others react to his many deaths which causes him to break down even more. Fortunately, Rem inexplicably appears before him and calms him down. However, Subaru realizes something is wrong and it is revealed that the person before him is actually the Witch of Lust, Carmilla. Echidna, who sent her to calm Subaru, confronts him and, after learning about his plight, offers to make a contract with him that would allow him to consult with her at any time. However, just as he is about to accept, the other witches interrupt and warn him not to trust Echidna. In response, Echidna comes clean to Subaru, revealing her desire is for his Return By Death and that she was the one who put Beatrice in the library to await "that person", who doesn't exist. Realizing that Echidna is a psychopath, Subaru cuts ties with her when Satella suddenly invades the mental space.
38	13	"The Sounds That Make You Want to Cry"; Transliteration: "Nakitakunaru Oto" (Japanese: 泣きたくなる音)	Kazuomi Koga	Eiji Umehara	Akira Nishimori	September 30, 2020
Satella confronts Subaru and tells him he should love himself more. However, hearing this by the person responsible for his suffering causes him to snap, ranting about how his life doesn't matter before attempting suicide to get out of the situation. However, Minerva revives him and Carmilla reminds him of how people grieved for him in the second trial, causing him to second guess himself. Having regained his fear of death, Subaru thanks the witches before parting ways, as Satella tells him when the time comes to "kill her". Waking up, Subaru is comforted by Patrasche and Otto and finds he can't take the trials anymore. He confronts Roswaal and, after confirming they know each others' secrets, Roswaal voices his disappointment in Subaru for still not taking full advantage of his looping ability. He further reveals that he hired Elsa with the end goal of molding Subaru in his image; Subaru can either save the mansion or Sanctuary, not both. Realizing that Roswaal is a madman, Subaru flees until being confronted by Otto, who realized something is wrong, and tells him to stop shouldering his problems alone.

=== Part 2 ===
No. overall	No. in season	Title	Directed by	Written by	Storyboarded by	Original release date
39	14	"Straight Bet" (Note: Stylized in all caps)	Hiroyuki Tsuchiya	Yoshiko Nakamura	Kenichi Kawamura	January 6, 2021
Otto convinces Subaru to let him help and, after telling him everything, the two form a plan. The next day, Subaru confronts Roswaal with a wager: if he saves both Sanctuary and the mansion in this loop Roswaal will give up his tome. Roswaal agrees under the proviso that if he wins Subaru will follow the tome's instructions. After talking to Ryuzu about Garfiel, Subaru checks on Emilia and she tells him about her past: Puck found her frozen in ice and the two lived an isolated life until Roswaal found them. Roswaal promised to save her fellow elves, who were turned into ice sculptures, should she win the Royal Selection. However, she can't remember anything from before that. Subaru manages to get Puck to appear and he reveals that their contract is suppressing Emilia's memories. Thus, deeming her to not need him anymore, he breaks it and disappears. Overcome with grief, Emilia runs away and the Arlam Villagers search for her. Garfiel helps in the search but also finds that Subaru is plotting something just as he is confronted by Otto. Meanwhile, Emilia hides out at the ruin when she is confronted by Subaru.
40	15	"Otto Suwen"; Transliteration: "Ottō Sūwen" (Japanese: オットー・スーウェン)	Kazuhiro Ozawa	Yoshiko Nakamura	Kazuhiro Ozawa	January 13, 2021
40	15	"A Reason to Believe"; Transliteration: "Shinjiru Riyū" (Japanese: 信じる理由)	Kazuhiro Ozawa	Yoshiko Nakamura	Kazuhiro Ozawa	January 13, 2021
Otto holds off Garfiel by getting him to chase after him and uses his ability to talk to animals to have them make all sorts of traps. As he runs away, Otto recalls his past growing up as an outcast due to his ability. He was constantly on the move up until he met Subaru after he and his comrades saved him from the Witch Cult. Garfiel eventually catches Otto, but Ram comes to his defense and a fight ensues. Meanwhile, at the ruin, Emilia demands Subaru reprimand her for running away. Realizing Emilia is suffering from a severe negativity bias she holds toward herself, Subaru confesses to her. However, she believes he is just pushing his ideal image of her onto her again, so in response, Subaru says he is aware of her flaws but loves her in spite of them. They then kiss, which Emilia does not reject, giving her the courage to believe in herself. The two then exit the ruin and find that Garfiel is waiting for them, having defeated Otto and Ram.
41	16	"Nobody Can Lift a Quain Stone Alone"; Transliteration: "Kuwein no Ishi wa Hitori ja Agaranai" (Japanese: クウェインの石は一人じゃ上がらない)	Kazuomi Koga	Eiji Umehara	Kazuomi Koga	January 20, 2021
Subaru realizes that Garfiel's aggression is a result of his insecurity over the reason for the departure of his mother from the Sanctuary. Garfiel believes that his mother left the Sanctuary 10 years ago because she preferred to find a better life outside, rather than stay with him and Frederica. Garfiel reveals that he witnessed his mother die in a landslide as she was leaving the Sanctuary, and that this is the reason why he so vehemently opposes Subaru's campaign to liberate it. Using the power of "Invisible Providence" from the Sloth Witch Factor, he is able to best Garfiel in one-on-one combat. At this point, Ram convinces Garfiel to confront his past and re-take the trial. In the trial, Garfiel learns that his mother actually left the sanctuary to find his father; accepting the truth of his past, he makes peace with Subaru. As Emilia prepares to retake her own trial, Subaru promises to go on a proper date with Emilia after everything is finished. As Emilia begins the trial, Echidna welcomes her as the "Witch's Daughter".
42	17	"A Journey Through Memories"; Transliteration: "Kioku no Tabiji" (Japanese: 記憶の旅路)	Takashi Sakuma	Masahiro Yokotani	Hiroyuki Shimazu	January 27, 2021
Accompanied by Echidna, Emilia is surrounded with dreamlike memories of her childhood. She is immediately presented with scenes of the Princess Room, her childhood home in the forest, as well as her aunt, Mother Fortuna, who is raising her in her parents' absence. Young Emilia follows a lesser spirit into the nearby village to observe Mother Fortuna, who speaks with Petelgeuse and other witch cultists as they deliver donations of books and clothing. Petelgeuse asks Fortuna about "the seal" and states that Emilia's parents would be cross if anything were to happen to it. Emilia sneaks out of the Princess Room from time to time, continuing to eavesdrop upon Fortuna and Petelgeuse, who repeatedly asks about the seal. Curious about the seal, Emilia asks the lesser spirits to lead her to it and finds a large black door in a snowy forest clearing. Petelgeuse and Fortuna cross paths with Emilia in the forest, cementing a close relationship with each other. Fortuna learns of Emilia's ability to use spiritual arts and Petelgeuse accidentally says Emilia's parents have passed away. Fortuna promises to Emilia that they will talk about her parents someday. As they escort Emilia back to her Princess Room, they are suddenly confronted by the Sin Archbishop of Greed, Regulus Corneus.
43	18	"The Day Betelgeuse Laughed"; Transliteration: "Heikeboshi no Waratta Hi" (Japanese: 平家星の笑った日)	Yoshito Mikamo	Masahiro Yokotani	Kenichi Kawamura	February 3, 2021
Outside the graveyard, Ryuzu Shima reveals to Subaru and the group that she has undergone the trial as well and possesses some of the memories of the original Ryuzu Meyer. Many generations ago, Ryuzu befriended Beatrice and spent time with her while her "mother", Echidna, was busy. During this time, she also meets a young Roswaal. Meanwhile, in Emilia's trial, Fortuna and Petelgeuse stand to protect young Emilia from Regulus, who is now joined by the Witch of Vanity, Pandora, a white-haired girl who is searching for the "key" and "seal". Petelgeuse tells Fortuna to run away with Emilia while he holds them off. He opens a cursed box and is granted the ability to use his Unseen Hands in his fight against Regulus. Seeing this, Pandora grants him the title of "Sloth" in recognition of his resolve. Echidna then convinces the current Emilia to face her past and they are transported back to young Emilia and Fortuna. Recognizing the need to rejoin Petelgeuse, Fortuna asks Archi to escort Emilia to safety. Prior to parting, she tells young Emilia she will never leave her and that she will never be alone, and both Emilias break down. Archi is attacked by the Black Serpent as he runs with Emilia in the forest, and succumbs to the infection just after he gets Emilia to continue to run on her own. As Fortuna rejoins Petelgeuse, Pandora urges an animated Regulus to calm down, and he seems to kill Pandora in an attack of rage. Suddenly reappearing, Pandora sends a stunned Regulus away. Thinking of a way to help Petelgeuse and Fortuna, Emilia returns to the seal, only to find Pandora there waiting for her.
44	19	"The Permafrost of Elior Forest"; Transliteration: "Eriōru Dai Shinrin no Eikyū Tōdo" (Japanese: エリオール大森林の永久凍土)	Hiroyuki Tsuchiya	Masahiro Yokotani	Goichi Iwahata	February 10, 2021
Pandora reveals to Emilia that, as the Witch's Daughter, she possesses the key to unlock the seal and tries to convince Emilia to open it for her. Despite Pandora promising no harm to the forest's residents if Emilia unlocks the seal, Emilia refuses because of a promise she made to Mother Fortuna. Fortuna soon arrives and comforts Emilia while fighting off Pandora. Petelgeuse also arrives to assist in the fight, but in an enraged haze, accidentally attacks and mortally wounds Fortuna. The dying woman apologizes to her brother for not doing enough for his daughter, while Emilia tearfully forgives her. Meanwhile, Petelgeuse goes insane after realizing what he has done, his actions being praised by Pandora for stemming from his love. Emilia's deep grief causes her magic to go out of control as she attempts to kill Pandora, but eventually freezes the entirety of the forest. Before Emilia herself ends up in deep sleep, Pandora erases Emilia's memory of her existence and then disappears with a laughing Petelgeuse. Having now finished the trial, Emilia reconciles with the actions of her past self and acknowledges the decisions she made at that time; she will fight to save her frozen friends and family for a world where they can live in happily. Echidna declares that she has passed the trial, and Emilia wakes up in the temple and mourns over her mother. Subaru, Otto, and Garfiel confront Roswaal, who reveals that Otto, a seemingly insignificant contributor to the prophecy, has allowed Subaru to rewrite "the game" and has gained his respect. Subaru then demands that Roswaal surrender because he now knows the true purpose of the Sanctuary.
45	20	"The Beginning of the Sanctuary and the Beginning of the End"; Transliteration: "Seiiki no Hajimari to, Hōkai no Hajimari" (Japanese: 聖域の始まりと、崩壊の始まり)	Kazuomi Koga	Masahiro Yokotani	Goichi Iwahata	February 17, 2021
In the past, Roswaal is saved during his "magical release period" by Echidna, becoming her pupil and falling in love with her. He develops a close bond with her as they, Beatrice, and Ryuzu look after the Sanctuary. One day, the "Devil of Melancholy", Hector, shows up, leaving Roswaal worried about what to do since the Sanctuary's barrier is still incomplete. Ryuzu, as thanks to Echidna for saving her, volunteers to act as the core to erect the barrier at the cost of her own life. Roswaal and Echidna buy time fighting Hector, allowing Beatrice to take Ryuzu to the core, where she soon realizes she'll be sacrificing herself. Beatrice tries to convince her not to, but Ryuzu goes through with it as they tearfully say their goodbyes. In the present, Subaru asks Roswaal to call off the attack on the mansion but he refuses, believing that a couple minor changes isn't enough to overwrite the tome's will. Roswaal argues with Subaru over his belief that feelings are weakness and how no one can change, expressing how he has since grown obsessed over his love for Echidna. He accuses Subaru of being just like himself because of pushing each other's ideals on the women they love, though Subaru denies this and defends Emilia. Meanwhile, Emilia leaves the graveyard and meets Ram, who had been waiting for her.
46	21	"Reunion of Roars"; Transliteration: "Hōkō no Saikai" (Japanese: 咆哮の再会)	Takashi Sakuma	Yoshiko Nakamura	Hiroyuki Shimazu	February 24, 2021
With the surrender negotiations having failed, Subaru, Otto, and Garfiel plan to head back to the mansion to stop Elsa. Garfiel reveals that he has a mixed-blood father and human mother and therefore can also leave the Sanctuary at will. Ram tells Emilia about Subaru's plans, and asks her to save Roswaal from his obsessive delusions just as he reveals himself. Roswaal attempts to claim that he and Subaru are one and the same because of how he pushes his ideals onto her, but Emilia retaliates. Recalling her earlier conversation with Subaru, she tells Roswaal how Subaru loves her, including all her flaws, which shocks Roswaal. As Emilia heads back in to start the second trial, Roswaal heads off as he instructs Ram to wait for Emilia to finish the trial. Instead, she confronts him shortly afterwards in front of Ryuzu's crystal, as he wields the Tome. He reveals that he plans to use the excess mana stored in the crystal to create snowfall (thus summoning the Great Rabbit), and expects Ram is there to fight him as retribution for being enslaved by him, as one of the men who burned down her village. However, Ram states that she wants to save him from Echidna's delusions and also reveals her trump card, assistance from Puck, and the three prepare to duel. At the mansion, Elsa starts her attack on Petra and Frederica, but an armored Garfiel arrives and reunites with his sister. As he prepares to fight Elsa, Petra is met by Subaru who confronts her before leaving to find Beatrice.
47	22	"Happiness Reflected on the Water's Surface"; Transliteration: "Minamo ni Utsuru Shiawase" (Japanese: 水面に映る幸せ)	Hiroyuki Tsuchiya	Eiji Umehara	Masayoshi Nishida	March 3, 2021
While Garfiel and Elsa engage in combat, Subaru confronts Beatrice in her library. She claims that since her death was foretold in the Tome, she is satisfied with that being her purpose. Subaru tries to talk sense into her - to leave behind her promise to Echidna and carve out a new path for herself. When she asks if he is "that person", he says no - but before he can clarify, she instinctively kicks him out of her room. He regroups with Otto, Petra, and Frederica (carrying the unconscious Rem), where they encounter Meili. Frederica stays behind to fight her while the others head to a secret escape passage, only to be stopped by a mabeast guiltylowe. Meanwhile, Emilia takes the second trial where she ends up in an alternate present, happily living back in her forest with Fortuna and Petelgeuse. After having a picnic where she tells them to be more open about their feelings for each other, she has a conversation with Archi. She expresses that she will stand by her resolve to be an admirable person like all those who have looked out for her, past and present, and wants to help others. Archi, now replaced by Echidna, is thanked by Emilia for showing her this world. Echidna merely looks on depressed, tearfully telling her she hates her before disappearing. Emilia heads back outside where she's met with the support of both the villagers and the demi-humans. They have started to come around after hearing about Garfiel's resolve, and they cheer her on. She enters the graveyard once more to take the third and final trial, ready to face "a disaster yet to come."
48	23	"Love Me Down to My Blood and Guts"; Transliteration: "Chi to Zōmotsu Made Aishite" (Japanese: 血と臓物まで愛して)	Kazuomi Koga	Eiji Umehara	Kenichi Kawamura	March 10, 2021
As a result of the fight against the mabeast guiltylowe, the mansion is set ablaze. Subaru leaves to find Beatrice while Otto and Petra run to escape the burning mansion. Back in the graveyard, Emilia undergoes the third trial, where she is subjected to a series of visions and voices from potential futures. She finds herself alone in Echidna's head space, until Minerva appears (keeping her face and identity hidden), remarking that Echidna was too upset to see Emilia. During their conversation, Minerva briefly mentions Emilia's mother, but won't say anything more. Before she leaves, Emilia tells the witch the next time they see each other they'll all have a tea party together, including Echidna. Waking up, Emilia enters the now open grave of Echidna and undoes the magic spell powering the barrier. Leaving the graveyard again, she finds the Sanctuary covered in a blizzard. Back at the burning mansion, Garfiel reveals his knowledge of Elsa being a vampire, and despite her near invulnerability, can be killed. She reveals her backstory of living alone in cold until she found that slicing up people to be the only thing that would keep her warm. During the fight, Elsa is distracted as Frederica escapes with Meili, and ends up underneath Garfiel, biting each other on the neck. Garfiel finally ends things by crushing her under a rock pig's corpse. Meanwhile, in a snowless sanctuary, Puck and Ram continue their battle against Roswaal. During the fight he reveals that he intentionally put a spell on Emilia's contract with Puck before entering the Sanctuary to discourage her during the trials. Ram also reveals she loves Roswaal and wishes to save him, completely bewildering him. She manages to steal the Tome, happily throwing it into the fire, just as an enraged Roswaal shoots a fire blast directly at Ram.
49	24	"Choose Me"; Transliteration: "Ore o Erabe" (Japanese: 俺を選べ)	Kazuhiro Ozawa	Yoshiko Nakamura	Kazuhiro Ozawa	March 17, 2021
In the aftermath of their battle, snow begins to fall in the Sanctuary and Puck realizes Roswaal had activated the spell to change the weather before their fight. Puck leaves to buy time to help the others while Roswaal stays behind, trying to heal the unconscious Ram. Emilia finds a large ice sculpture protecting the villagers from the snow and learns that Puck used most of his magic to save them. As she ventures out to save them, she encounters the Ryuzu clones, where Shima fuses herself with the original Ryuzu Meyer before disappearing. Emilia and the clones find Roswaal and Ram, having them taken to safety so that she can stay behind to fight against the Great Rabbit horde that has appeared. At the burning mansion, Beatrice reflects on her life: when Echidna first instructed her to watch over the library, her encounters with the many generations of the Mathers, and waiting for "that person", who she thinks may be Subaru. He returns and tries to convince her again to take his hand and join him. As the library begins to burn, she kicks him out again after he refuses to tell her the lie she wishes to hear. He emerges one final time as the last unopened door in the mansion is opened. He asks Beatrice to choose him, as even though he won't live as long as she will, she'll never be alone because he'll always be there for her for the tomorrows to come. A blast of light suddenly appears from the mansion, streaking across the sky. Beatrice, having taken Subaru's hand, reappears with him in the Sanctuary next to Emilia, and they prepare to face off against the Great Rabbit.
50	25	"Offbeat Steps Under the Moonlight"; Transliteration: "Gekka, Detarame na Suteppu" (Japanese: 月下、出鱈目なステップ)	Masaharu Watanabe	Masahiro Yokotani	Masaharu Watanabe	March 24, 2021
With a contract now in place, Subaru and Beatrice work with Emilia to use their combined powers to trap the Great Rabbit. Beatrice seals the mabeasts in another dimension using Al Shamac, saving the Sanctuary. Beatrice and Roswaal then visit the grave of Echidna, where he reveals he is in fact the original Roswaal, having figured out how to use soul transcription into each of his descendents. Meanwhile, Subaru and Emilia reconnect outside, where she mistakenly believes she's pregnant due to their kiss. Most of the group take turns punching Roswaal as punishment for everything he's done, before trying to negotiate what to do next; Subaru being aware that they'll still need his assistance in the future. Roswaal reveals that due to their bet, an oath curse has appeared on his chest preventing him from betraying them without dying. They finally agree to believe him, though some reluctantly so; Emilia gets him to apologize as well. Later, everyone attends a ceremony where Subaru is formally knighted in Emilia's service. Roswaal reveals to Subaru that he ultimately plans to find a way to revive Echidna. Now without the Tome of Wisdom, he expresses his faith in Subaru while also threatening to reduce everyone to ashes should Subaru lose anyone important to him. Alone on a balcony after being knighted, Subaru is met by Emilia where they reaffirm their trust and belief in each other before rejoining the festivities.

== Home media release ==
=== Japanese ===
Kadokawa Corporation (Japan – Region 2/A)
Vol.	Episodes	Break Time	Cover art	Release date
1	26–29	12–15	Echidna	October 28, 2020
2	30–32	16–18	Natsuki Subaru, Natsuki Kenichi and Natsuki Naoko	November 25, 2020
3	33–35	19–21	Elsa Granhiert and Meili Portroute	December 23, 2020
4	36–38	22–24	Petra Leyte and Frederica Baumann	January 27, 2021
5	39–41	25–27	Garfiel Tinzel and Ryuzu Meyer clone	April 28, 2021
6	42–44	28–30	Petelgeuse Romanée-Conti, Emilia and Fortuna	May 26, 2021
7	45–47	31–33	Roswaal L. Mathers and Beatrice	June 30, 2021
8	48–50	34–36	Natsuki Subaru and Emilia	July 28, 2021
Box	26–50	12–36	Ram and Beatrice	October 25, 2024

=== English ===
Crunchyroll, LLC (North America – Region 1/A)
Box	Episodes	Break Time	Release date
Season 2	26–50	12–36	September 19, 2023
