= Re:Zero season 3 =

Third season of anime television series

Re:Zero − Starting Life in Another World
- Season 3
- Cover art for the first home media volume of the third season, featuring Emilia
- No. of episodes: 16

Release
- Original network: AT-X
- Original release: October 2, 2024 – March 26, 2025

Season chronology
- ← Previous; Season 2 Next → Season 4

Re:Zero − Starting Life in Another World is an anime television series based on the light novel series Re:Zero − Starting Life in Another World written by Tappei Nagatsuki and illustrated by Shinichirou Otsuka. In March 2023, it was announced that a third season of the anime series was in production. The season is animated by White Fox and directed by Masahiro Shinohara, who replaces Masaharu Watanabe as series director. Haruka Sagawa is serving as character designer. It premiered on October 2, 2024, with a 90-minute special season premiere. The first cours, entitled the "Attack Arc", (Note: Shūgeki-hen (襲撃編)) ran from October 2 to November 20, 2024. The second cours, entitled the "Counterattack Arc", (Note: Hangeki-hen (反撃編)) ran from February 5 to March 26, 2025. The season adapts "Arc 5" of the series (volumes 16–20 of the light novel).

The opening theme song is "Reweave", performed by Konomi Suzuki, while the ending theme song is "Nox Lux", performed by Myth & Roid. Both theme songs are used for the entire season.

Immediately following the conclusion of the third season, a fourth season was announced to be in production.

== Episodes ==
=== Attack Arc ===
No. overall	No. in season	Title	Directed by	Written by	Storyboarded by	Original release date
51	1	"Theatrical Malice"; Transliteration: "Gekijō-gata Akui" (Japanese: 劇場型悪意)	Masahiro Shinohara, Hiroyuki Tsuchiya & Risa Suzuki	Masahiro Yokotani	Masahiro Shinohara, Goichi Iwahata & Risa Suzuki	October 2, 2024 (Note: Episode 51 is a 90-minute special.)
One year after the Sanctuary Incident, Emilia's camp is invited by Anastasia's camp to the Watergate City of Priestella, alongside Felt and Crusch's camps, enticed by a magic stone to revive Puck. Unfortunately, after arriving in the city with Subaru, Beatrice, Otto, and Garfiel, Emilia's deal for the stone falls through when Subaru befriends local bard Liliana Masquerade, who the merchant is infatuated with. After reuniting with the camp leaders, including Julius, Reinhard, Felix, and Wilhelm, they are surprised when Priscilla's camp crashes the meet-up, including Reinhard's father, Heinkel Astrea. This causes Subaru to learn about Wilhelm's strained relationship with Reinhard, whom he unjustly blamed for his wife's death. Meanwhile, mocked by visions of Elsa, Garfiel wanders the city with Anastasia's follower, Mimi, when he shockingly runs into his mother, who is still alive. Later, Subaru, Emilia, and Beatrice encounter Liliana performing with Priscilla, who is fond of the Songstress. However, after breaking with the group, Subaru is confronted by the Sin Archbishop of Wrath, Sirius Romanée-Conti, who preaches to a crowd before dropping a child to his death, which inexplicably kills the audience too. As a result, Subaru "Returns by Death" to his encounter with Liliana and Priscilla.
52	2	"A Showdown of Fire and Ice"; Transliteration: "Hyōen no Ketsumatsu" (Japanese: 氷炎の結末)	Ichinosuke Akikaze	Yoshiko Nakamura	Shinji Itadaki	October 9, 2024
Having mere minutes, Subaru rushes to the spot Sirius will appear to rescue the child, Lusbel, only to learn that the Sin Archbishop has also captured his friend, Tina. Sirius then arrives and easily overpowers Subaru, killing him. Respawning again, Subaru realizes he is no match for Sirius and seeks Reinhard's help, convincing Felt's follower, Rachins, to summon him. However, while Reinhard quickly arrives and easily kills Sirius, this inexplicably causes everybody else to die in the exact same way, including Subaru. Respawning for a third time, Subaru privately informs Beatrice about the incoming attack, and they brainstorm a countermeasure against Sirius' damage-sharing ability. Having noticed their actions, Emilia appears and insists on helping them, which Subaru reluctantly allows. After confronting Sirius, the Sin Archbishop becomes enraged upon seeing Emilia and fights her while Subaru and Beatrice rescue Lusbel. Sirius seemingly immolates Emilia by catching her off guard using Tina as a hostage. However, although knocked unconscious, she is saved by the Sin Archbishop of Greed, Regulus Corneus, who intends to take her as his 79th wife.
53	3	"Gorgeous Tiger"; Transliteration: "Gōjasu Taigā" (Japanese: ゴージャス・タイガー)	Takashi Nagayoshi	Masahiro Yokotani	Takashi Nagayoshi	October 16, 2024
At the city gates, Otto encounters the Sin Archbishop of Gluttony, Lye Batenkaitos. Back at the battle, Subaru tries to rescue Emilia from Regulus using Invisible Providence, but it fails. However, it causes Sirius to focus on him, believing Subaru is Petelgeuse. The Archbishops then leave per the Gospel's instructions, with Regulus grievously injuring Subaru, which is copied to everyone else in the area by Sirius' Authority. Meanwhile, after interacting with his mother's new family, Garfiel learns she has amnesia after her current husband rescued her from the landslide. Later, Subaru wakes up in an underground bunker, tended to by Al and Felix, and learns that Beatrice used up her mana to heal the injured. Joining Crusch, Anastasia, and Wilhelm, he is informed that the Witch's Cult has taken control of the four towers surrounding the city and the Sin Archbishop of Lust, Capella Emerada Lugunica, is threatening to flood it if they don't receive the remains of the witch buried beneath the city. Concurrently, Garfiel runs into his mother again, who is worried about her missing family, and promises he will find them.
54	4	"Operation: Take Back the Government Office"; Transliteration: "Toshi Chōsha Dakkan Sakusen" (Japanese: 都市庁舎奪還作戦)	Hiroyuki Tsuchiya	Eiji Umehara	Yasuaki Fujii	October 23, 2024
In the city, Heinkel holds Felt hostage to prevent Reinhard from leaving. At the Muse Company base, Subaru and the group discuss Capella's potential relationship to a Emerada Lugunica from fifty years ago, and that the witch's remains are only known by the Council of Ten, including Muse's leader Kiritaka. Garfiel then arrives carrying a bloodied Mimi, due to an encounter with two Witch Cultists, a woman and a man with four arms, with Mimi having a wound that won't close, which Wilhelm recognizes. After Kiritaka reveals that the witch's remains can't be removed or else it will destroy the city, and learning that Capella has several hostages, they plan a counterattack to regain control of city hall, now joined by Julius and Ricardo; Al heads off to find Priscilla. The group battle the Witch Cultists, as Capella, transformed into a dragon, appears to taunt them before leaving. Subaru, Crusch, and Julius chase after her, when they run into the Sin Archbishop of Gluttony, Roy Alphard. Meanwhile, Emilia wakes up naked in a bed and is greeted by Regulus, who asks if she is a virgin.
55	5	"A Dark Torrent"; Transliteration: "Dakuryū" (Japanese: 濁流)	Kazue Otsuki	Eiji Umehara	Susumu Nishizawa	October 30, 2024
Regulus is delighted by Emilia's ignorance and introduces her to one of his wives, "Number 184". Julius stays behind to fight Roy while Subaru and Crusch head into city hall, quickly subduing a dragon and rescuing a hostage. Subaru is shocked to find a room covered in giant flies, just as Crusch is knocked out by the hostage, revealing herself to be Capella, who has the power to transform herself and others. She transforms into Emilia to mock Subaru's idea of love, rips off his injured leg, and proceeds to give him and Crusch some of her dragon's blood. Meanwhile, Kiritaka is unable to get in contact with the Council of Ten, when the Muse Company is attacked by Sirius. Anastasia is able to escape thanks to her followers and Kiritaka's personal guard, the White Dragon's Scales. Elsewhere, Otto uses his powers to cause a distraction allowing Reinhard to rescue Felt from Heinkel. Just then, the watergates are suddenly opened and the city begins flooding. The transformed dragon attempts to fly away with Crusch and Subaru, but Capella's attack causes Subaru to plummet into the water. As Emilia watches the devastation, Capella announces three more demands: the Tome of Wisdom, the artificial spirit, and to not interfere with the upcoming wedding.
56	6	"Conditions of the Knight"; Transliteration: "Kishi no Jōken" (Japanese: 騎士の条件)	Masahiro Shinohara, Ichinosuke Akikaze & Kazue Otsuki	Masahiro Yokotani	Masatoshi Hakada	November 6, 2024
184 tells Emilia that if she tries to escape the Witch Cult will re-open the flood gates. Subaru awakens having been saved from the flood by Priscilla and Liliana, and is shocked to discover his leg fully healed and with regenerative properties, thanks to the dragon's blood Capella gave him. Priscilla informs him of the new demands, just as she takes out a group of demi-beasts that have been unleashed on the city. They enter a refugee shelter, where the civilians are erratic due to Wrath's Authority, but Liliana sings to them, revealing she has the power to override the Authority. Elsewhere, while trying on her wedding dress with Regulus, he takes his anger out on 184, nearly killing her, causing Emilia to be shocked that 184 displays no emotion over it. Subaru reunites with the group learning that while they lost the Muse Company, they regained city hall, but also that Crusch is currently suffering badly due to the dragon's blood. Subaru informs Anastasia and Julius about Beatrice being an artificial spirit and that the Tome of Wisdom has been destroyed. While discussing how to deal with the unrest in the refugee shelters with little casualties, Subaru declares his desire to save everyone, defeat all their enemies, and achieve their happy ending. Meanwhile, Emilia spies on Regulus, who is arguing with Capella on a metia, learning they weren't responsible for opening the floodgates. She goes to use the metia for herself, when unexpectedly Al calls it.
57	7	"The Newest of Heroes and the Most Ancient of Heroes"; Transliteration: "Mottomo Atarashī Eiyū to Mottomo Furui Eiyū" (Japanese: 最も新しい英雄と最も古い英雄)	Masato Gotō	Yoshiko Nakamura	Masahiro Shinohara	November 13, 2024
Al finds a metia from a witch cultist, inadvertently calling Emilia who informs him of the locations of Regulus and Capella. He delivers her message to Subaru and the group, now joined by Garfiel, at city hall, just as Subaru plans to use the master metia to combat Wrath's Authority affecting the city by broadcasting a hopeful message to everyone. Garfiel volunteers Subaru to do it, which is supported by everyone else; Al voices his concerns over Subaru taking up so much responsibility, which ultimately convinces him to accept. Meanwhile, Emilia learns from 184 that Regulus killed everyone who knew her and all his other wives, all for the sake of his possessiveness. Subaru gives an impactful and earnest speech to the city, talking about his insecurities, yet firm resolve to save everyone and defeat the threats, which manages to reach all the civilians and relieving some of their anxiety. Emilia voices her confidence in Subaru and her desire to help 184, while the rest of the group in the city hall express their approval over Subaru's speech. Just as they are about to resume their counter-attack planning, they are joined by Otto and Reinhard.
58	8	"The One I'll Love Someday"; Transliteration: "Itsuka Sukininaru Hito" (Japanese: いつか好きになる人)	Hidekazu Hara	Yoshiko Nakamura	Ryūhei Aoyagi	November 20, 2024
While discussing the Witch Cult's demands, Otto reveals that he acquired the burned up remains of the Tome of Wisdom and brought it into the city to be restored; he secretly tells Subaru he desires to use it to future proof against any secret plans of Roswaal's. Subaru visits an awakened and suffering Crusch, but upon touching her, parts of her infection is healed and transferred to his right arm; she stops him before he can do anymore. Wilhelm then reveals to Subaru the identities of the two Witch Cultists, the resurrected bodies of "Eight-Arms" Kurgan, the strongest swordsman of the Volakia Empire, and his wife, the previous Sword Saint Theresia van Astrea. He also reveals that Theresia lost her divine protection, which transferred to Reinhard, during her battle with the White Whale, which lead to her death. The group are soon joined by Priscilla and Liliana, who volunteers to confront Sirius, using Liliana's singing to counter Wrath's Authority. Wilhelm and Garfiel are assigned to confront Capella, Kurgan, and Theresia, Reinhard and Subaru in confronting Regulus to rescue Emilia, and Julius and Ricardo to track down Gluttony. At the church, Regulus begins the ceremony, in which Emilia confronts him on his feelings about love, increasingly enraging him. Before he can retaliate, Subaru and Reinhard bust through the doors and introduce themselves, to Emilia's delight.

=== Counterattack Arc ===
No. overall	No. in season	Title	Directed by	Written by	Storyboarded by	Original release date
59	9	"City Scramble"; Transliteration: "Konsen Toshi" (Japanese: 混戦都市)	Ichinosuke Akikaze	Masahiro Yokotani	Yasuaki Fujii	February 5, 2025
As Priscilla suits up alongside Liliana to confront Sirius, she entrusts the protection of city hall to Al, as well as telling Liliana someone other than the Witch Cult has been hunting down the Council of Ten. Garfiel and Wilhelm find Capella and the corpse cultists, engaging in battle with Kurgan and Theresia respectively. At the church, Regulus halts Subaru and Reinhard from attacking him by threatening to kill his wives, and when he starts to choke out Emilia, Reinhard surrenders to him. Reinhard is forced to endure a fatal attack, initially killing him, but is quickly revived thanks to his divine protection and retaliates. Otto encounters Felt and the city knights facing off against Lye, realizing that there are two Sin Archbishops of Gluttony; he starts to distract him upon learning he wants to find Subaru. Elsewhere, Julius and Ricardo find Roy and engage in battle. As Reinhard continues to fight Regulus, Subaru and Emilia attempt to get 184 and the rest of the wives to safety, but they refuse, too scared of incurring Regulus' wrath. Subaru and Emilia head out to join the battle, in order to understand how Regulus' invincibility functions. Meanwhile, Garfiel and Kurgan are crushed by a mass of flesh left behind by Capella, while the real Archbishop confronts Crusch and Felix.
60	10	"The Plan to Conquer Greed"; Transliteration: "Gōyoku Kōryaku-sen" (Japanese: 強欲攻略戦)	Yasuaki Fujii	Eiji Umehara	Yasuaki Fujii	February 12, 2025
Capella provokes Felix into attacking her, and after stating she has no idea how to cure dragon's blood, "Crusch" is revealed to be a disguised Anastasia, blasting Capella down a trap into the underground tunnels, where Al is waiting for her. Meanwhile, Subaru, Emilia, and Reinhard try multiple different attempts to injure Regulus, but he remains unscathed each time. Attempting to deduce any information, Emilia says the wives referred to him as a "Little King"; Subaru then realizes that all the Archbishops are named after stars from Earth (Regulus meaning "little king" in Latin). Elsewhere, Sirius almost immediately puts Liliana under her spell, leading Priscilla to kiss her to snap her out of it. Sirius lures a group of brainwashed civilians toward them, so Priscilla tasks Liliana with breaking the spell while she fights her. Sirius is impressed by Priscilla's resistance towards her, but is able to rile her up by mentioning the names of stories, allowing her to land a direct hit. Back with Regulus, upon Emilia mentioning she felt nothing when he touched her, Subaru gets Reinhard to confirm his heart isn't beating, only to then be thrust up far into the atmosphere. With this knowledge, Subaru develops a plan, letting Emilia flee the battle while he confidently reveals to Regulus the power of his Authority: "Lion Heart", the ability to freeze his body in time, to the Archbishop's absolute fury.
61	11	"Liliana Masquerade"; Transliteration: "Ririana Masukarēdo" (Japanese: リリアナ・マスカレード)	Hiroyuki Tsuchiya	Masahiro Yokotani	Goichi Iwahata	February 19, 2025
Priscilla survives Sirius' attack unscathed, revealing her power to transfer any damage towards herself to one of her valuable items. Sirius attempts to reaffirm her desire for a "mutual understanding" with everyone, but when Liliana calls her out on the absurdities of it, her facade is broken and she retaliates in a rage. While Priscilla continues fighting, Liliana reaches the top of the tower to sing her song towards the brainwashed civilians. She reflects upon her life when she grew up with her family in a travelling troupe, and unsatisfied with her contributions, went off on her own to become "king of the bards". She travelled from town to town with mixed success, even discovering her parents moved on with a new child, nearly giving up in exhaustion until she receives inspiration for a song that is warmly received, eventually leading to her meeting Kiritaka in Priestella. Liliana's song successfully frees all of the civilians; in her anger, Sirius attempts to use Tina as her hostage again, but Priscilla easily rescues the girl and slashes Sirius, knocking her into the canal. Liliana falls into the lake after the tower is destroyed, and is saved by Kiritaka before she passes out. Meanwhile, as Subaru continues his explanation about Regulus' Authority, he deduces his wives are connected to his "little kingdom", entrusting Emilia with severing it.
62	12	"Regulus Corneas"; Transliteration: "Regurusu Koruniasu" (Japanese: レグルス・コルニアス)	Kazue Otsuki	Yoshiko Nakamura	Shinji Itadaki	February 26, 2025
Arriving at the church, Emilia convinces Regulus' wives to help defeat him, getting them to admit how much they hate him; 184 also reveals her real name, Sylphy. Emilia discovers the wives' role in Regulus' power: he connects his heart with theirs, allowing him to stop time on himself without consequence. Concluding that defeating Regulus requires their deaths, the wives prepare to commit suicide. However, Emilia instead puts them into cryosleep using her magic. She then returns to Subaru's side, but Regulus' Authority is still in effect since he considers Emilia one of his wives. Recalling his experiences with Petelgeuse and Satella, Subaru uses Invisible Providence to destroy the connection between Emilia and Regulus' hearts, finally rendering him vulnerable. Panicking, Regulus challenges the two to a one-versus-one duel, only to be met by a returned Reinhard, who accepts his challenge. The Sword Saint blasts the Sin Archbishop into the sky before striking him back down, critically injuring him. As he dies, Regulus realizes Emilia is the girl from 100 years ago and curses her with his last breath, despite her not even remembering him. Afterward, Emilia unfreezes the wives, and Subaru expresses confidence in the others winning their own battles.
63	13	"The Warrior's Commendation"; Transliteration: "Senshi no Shōsan" (Japanese: 戦士の称賛)	Masahiro Shinohara	Eiji Umehara	Susumu Nishizawa & Masahiro Shinohara	March 5, 2025
While battling Lye, Otto learns Felt's group was looking for a powerful metia, so agrees to stay behind with the city knights to keep him busy while Felt retrieves it. Elsewhere, Capella reveals to Al she's deduced he is the one responsible for opening the floodgates and killing the Council of Ten, disrupting her plans. She attempts to rile him up by transforming into Priscilla, but he slices her head off and destroys her body, only for it to regenerate once again. Meanwhile, Garfiel continues to fight Kurgan, but is overwhelmed by the warrior, being further distracted by his visions of Elsa. Knocked into the catacombs, Garfiel recalls a conversation with Wilhelm about Kurgan's life in the Vollachian Empire, and how he only wields all his Devil Cleavers to opponents he respects, which Garfiel intends to make him do. Their battle leads them into a shelter, where his half-siblings are, and he overcomes the Elsa illusions after defeating a loose demon. The civilians proceed to cheer on Garfiel to succeed, giving him confidence and gaining Kurgan's respect, who unleashes all his Cleavers. After the two brutally beat each other, Kurgan briefly regains his sense of self to tell Garfiel "Well done" as he crumbles away. At the same time, Wilhelm continues his battle against Theresia at a stalemate.
64	14	"Theresia van Astrea"; Transliteration: "Tereshia van Asutorea" (Japanese: テレシア・ヴァン・アストレア)	Hinako Masaki	Eiji Umehara	Kazuhiro Ozawa	March 12, 2025
As they fight, Wilhelm attempts to reason with Theresia, but is caught off guard and defeated when Heinkel stumbles upon them. Fortunately, Reinhard arrives before Theresia can kill them and instantly defeats her. Theresia then recalls her life: disliking violence, she initially rejected her calling after receiving the Divine Protection of the Sword Saint, but reluctantly accepted when her relatives died fighting in her place, until she met Wilhelm and he took over her duties. Afterward, they started a family and lived happily for many years, until the White Whale appeared and Heinkel convinced Theresia to join a subjugation party, despite Wilhelm's protests. Unfortunately, the assault fails when her Divine Protection gets transferred to Reinhard, and she is promptly killed by Pandora. Theresia awakens in the present in Wilhelm's arms, and the two confess their love to each other as she once again passes on. Heinkel tries berating Reinhard over killing his grandmother, only for the Sword Saint to show indifference. This prompts a detached Wilhelm to dismiss Reinhard after collecting Theresia's remains, leaving behind a manic Heinkel.
65	15	"A Hideous Dinner Party"; Transliteration: "Shūakunaru Bansan-kai" (Japanese: 醜悪なる晩餐会)	Ichinosuke Akikaze	Yoshiko Nakamura	Shinji Itadaki	March 19, 2025
Otto and the city knights find themselves unable to corner Lye, while elsewhere Roy is able to easily outmatch Julius and Ricardo with his sword mastery, martial arts, and magic. Roy further disturbs Julius by constantly calling him "Brother" and referring to a past event he can't remember. Meanwhile, Al activates the trap set for Capella, crumbling the entire city hall directly onto her. Outside he reunites with Anastasia and Felix, growing suspicious upon learning that Anastasia used a magic attack earlier. Capella then reconstitutes herself in front of them, however she states her intention to leave, which Anastasia deduces is due to the Gospel. Before fleeing, she siccs several demi-beasts after them, forcing them to escape until Reinhard arrives to take them out. Back with Lye, Otto deduces that Lye's superhuman ability is the result of obtaining the skills of whoever he consumes with his Authority. Lye proceeds to demonstrate his Gluttony on one of the city knights, instantly erasing his memory from everyone. After surviving more attacks, Lye is about to torture Otto to force him to give up his name, when an awakened Beatrice arrives as back-up. Lye surprisingly reveals to already know Beatrice's name, mimicking Rem, causing the two to realize that they must beat him now so Subaru doesn't meet him.
66	16	"The Result of the Battle for Priestella"; Transliteration: "Purisutera Kōbō-sen Rizaruto" (Japanese: プリステラ攻防戦リザルト)	Mamiko Sekiya	Masahiro Yokotani	Ryūhei Aoyagi	March 26, 2025
Beatrice holds off Lye, powering her spells with magic stones given to her by Al, until Felt arrives with their secret weapon: Echidna's staff. Lye attempts to eat Felt's name, only to convulse, revealing "Felt" is not her birth name. Seizing the opening, Beatrice activates the staff, unleashing a magic beam that critically injures Lye. However, before they can finish him off, a third Sin Archbishop of Gluttony, Louis Arneb, appears and forces them to let her and her brothers escape, ending the Battle for Priestella. After reuniting with Beatrice, Garfiel, and Otto, Subaru and Emilia meet with the other camps. They decide to have Emilia put Lust's victims into cryosleep until they find a cure, while the captured Sirius is to be transported to the capital for interrogation. Subaru attempts to question Sirius himself, however, she claims to be uninterested in the Cult's goals and only wants to revive Petelgeuse, who she believes now resides within Subaru; she also warns him to watch out for Gluttony. Afterward, as the city rebuilds, Subaru reunites with Julius but is stunned when Emilia does not recognize him, causing him to realize Roy ate his name.

== Home media release ==
=== Japanese ===
Kadokawa Corporation (Japan – Region 2/A)
Vol.	Episodes	Break Time	Cover character(s)	Release date
1	51	37	Emilia	January 24, 2025
2	52–55	38–41	Sirius Romanée-Conti and Petelgeuse Romanée-Conti	February 26, 2025
3	56–58	42–44	Liliana Masquerade	March 26, 2025
4	59–62	45–48	Regulus Corneas	May 28, 2025
5	63–66	49–52	Wilhelm van Astrea and Theresia van Astrea	June 25, 2025
