= Aldebaran (disambiguation) =

Aldebaran is the brightest star in the constellation Taurus.

Aldebaran may also refer to:

== Geography and geology ==
- Aldebaran Rock, conspicuous nunatak of bright red rock, located near the head of Bertram Glacier, Antarctica
- Aldebaranium, alternative name for the element Ytterbium

== Military and technology ==
- Aldebaran (rocket), airborne micro launcher
- USS Aldebaran (AF-10), a US navy ship
- Italian ship Aldebaran, several ships
- Aldebaran, French nuclear test in moruroa atoll

== Entertainment ==
- Aldebaran (film), a 1935 Italian drama film
- Worlds of Aldebaran (aka "Aldebaran"), a Franco-Belgian science fiction comic book series by Luiz Eduardo de Oliveira
  - Aldebaran (comics), a graphic novel within the comic book series
- Aldebaran (1975 film), a 1975 Greek drama film
- Aldebaran (novel), a 2007 Greek novel

=== Music ===
- "Aldebaran" (song), a song by Japanese-American singer Ai
- "Aldebaran", a song by Irish singer Enya from her album Enya
- "Aldebaran", a movement from Olivier Messiaen's Des canyons aux étoiles
- "Aldebaran", an album by French duo Natural Snow Buildings

=== Fictional elements ===
- Aldebaran, a city within the game Ragnarok Online
- Aldebaran (Re:Zero), a character in the light novel series Re:Zero − Starting Life in Another World
- Taurus Aldebaran, a character of the Saint Seiya manga/anime

== Other uses ==
- Aldebaran Robotics, makers of the Nao robot
