= Re:Zero season 4 =

Fourth season of anime television series

Re:Zero − Starting Life in Another World
- Season 4
- Key visual for the fourth season
- No. of episodes: 19

Release
- Original network: AT-X
- Original release: April 8 – September 30, 2026

Season chronology
- ← Previous; Season 3

Re:Zero − Starting Life in Another World is an anime television series based on the light novel series Re:Zero − Starting Life in Another World written by Tappei Nagatsuki and illustrated by Shinichirou Otsuka. Immediately following the conclusion of the third season, a fourth was announced to be in production. Like the third, the fourth season is animated by White Fox and directed by Masahiro Shinohara, with Haruka Sagawa serving as character designer. The first cours, entitled the "Loss Arc", (Note: Sōshitsu-hen (喪失編)) ran from April 8 to June 17, 2026, for a total of 11 episodes. The second cours, entitled the "Recapture Arc", (Note: Dakkan-hen (奪還編)) ran from August 12 to September 30 of the same year for a total of 8 episodes. The season adapts "Arc 6" of the light novel series (volumes 21–25).

The opening theme song is "Recollect", performed by Konomi Suzuki and Ashnikko, while the ending theme song is "Ender Ember", performed by Myth & Roid and TK from Ling Tosite Sigure.

== Episodes ==
=== Loss Arc ===
No. overall	No. in season	Title	Directed by	Written by	Storyboarded by	Original release date
67	1	"The Reason I'm Taking You With Me"; Transliteration: "Kimi o Tsuredasu Riyū" (Japanese: 君を連れ出す理由)	Masahiro Shinohara	Masahiro Yokotani	Shinji Itadaki	April 8, 2026
67	1	"Gorgeous Tiger Reloaded"; Transliteration: "Gōjasu Taigā Rirōdeddo" (Japanese: ゴージャス・タイガー・リローデッド)	Masahiro Shinohara	Masahiro Yokotani	Shinji Itadaki	April 8, 2026
Following the Battle of Priestella, Julius' name was consumed by Gluttony, leaving him forgotten by everyone besides Subaru. To cure Julius, along with the other victims of Gluttony and Lust, Anastasia proposes seeking out the legendary Sage, Shaula. Subaru, Emilia, Beatrice, Anastasia, and Julius head back to Roswaal's mansion to prepare for the journey to the Pleiades Watchtower, where Shaula is said to reside. Along the way, Subaru also deduces that an artificial spirit Anastasia is contracted with is possessing her—a copy of Echidna in the form of a fox, whom Subaru nicknames "Foxidna". Foxidna explains that Anastasia's consciousness has gone dormant and the possession is gradually consuming the latter's lifeforce; thus, she seeks Shaula for a method to awaken her. After arriving at the mansion, Subaru decides to bring the comatose Rem along on the trip, wanting to be there when she wakes up. He also recruits Meili to help traverse the mabeast-infested Auguria Dunes surrounding the Watchtower. Meanwhile, back in Priestella, Garfiel and Mimi visit the former's mother and bond with her new children, Fred and Rafiel, before parting ways.
68	2	"Overcome Sand Time"; Transliteration: "Suna Jikan o Koero" (Japanese: 砂時間を越えろ)	Hinako Masaki	Yoshiko Nakamura	Shinji Itadaki	April 15, 2026
With Ram joining them, Subaru's party sets off for the Auguria Dunes. After several days of traversing the desert, the group deduces that the area is under a huge spatial magic that prevents them from reaching the watchtower. Having been told by a local that birds have been spotted reaching the tower, Subaru has Ram use her clairvoyance on one, allowing them to find the way through. Unfortunately, they then find themselves surrounded by a pack of mabeasts, forcing them to flee until a flash of light from the tower snipes Subaru in the head, killing him. Respawning just before the chase, Subaru, Beatrice, and Patrasche take a different path towards the tower, only for the light to kill all three of them. Respawning again, Subaru successfully avoids the entire chase this time before having Ram use her clairvoyance to detect who is targeting him, allowing Emilia and Julius to deflect the first shot. Subaru and Beatrice erect an anti-magic field to neutralize more shots, but this interferes with the area's spatial magic, opening a rift that the group falls into. Meanwhile, at the watchtower, the girl who has been killing Subaru notes that she "found him".
69	3	"The Keeper of the Watchtower"; Transliteration: "Kanshi-tō no Ban'nin" (Japanese: 監視塔の番人)	Hidekazu Hara	Yoshiko Nakamura	Hidekazu Hara	April 22, 2026
Separated from the others and finding himself in an underground passage with Ram, Foxidna, and his land dragon, Patrasche, Subaru and his companions search for an exit. Going right after encountering a fork in the road, they encounter multiple closed doors that mysteriously open when Subaru interacts with them, until they reach one that refuses to open for some reason. Concurrently, the group grows strangely fatigued and anxious, leading to a fight between Subaru and Ram, resulting in Foxidna fatally stabbing the latter. However, Ram survives and bisects Foxidna, killing her. Patrasche then kills Ram before she can kill Subaru, only for the land dragon to turn on Subaru and kill him herself. Returning to before they turned right, Subaru deduces that the path is laden with madness-inducing miasma and convinces the others to go left this time. However, this leads them to cross paths with a powerful centaur-like mabeast. Fortunately, a girl from the watchtower appears and kills it, after which Subaru loses consciousness from fatigue.
70	4	"A White Sky Asterism"; Transliteration: "Shiroi Hoshizora no Asuterizumu" (Japanese: 白い星空のアステリズム)	Tamaki Nakatsu	Masahiro Yokotani	Kazue Otsuki	April 29, 2026
Following a strange dream featuring the people whose witch factors he absorbed—Satalla, Petelgeuse, and Regulus—Subaru wakes up at the watchtower to find that his group has reunited with the others. He then meets the girl who saved him, who mistakes him for her "master", whose return she has been awaiting for 400 years, due to the miasma from his recent deaths. The girl reveals herself to be Shaula but clarifies that, contrary to common belief, she is merely the sage's disciple; the actual Sage was her master, a man named Flügel. Though Shaula cannot help them, the party concludes that they might obtain the knowledge they seek from the tower's library. However, they find that accessing it requires solving a riddle left by Flügel: "Who is the hero Shaula defeated"? While the others cannot make sense of it, Subaru deduces that the riddle refers to the star Shaula and concludes that the hero is Orion from Greek mythology. Having solved the riddle, the group is then teleported to the library.
71	5	"Stick Swinger"; Transliteration: "Bōburi" (Japanese: 棒振り)	Takashi Nagayoshi	Yoshiko Nakamura	Yasuaki Fujii	May 6, 2026
Since Flügel's riddle used knowledge from Earth, Subaru concludes that the sage must have been transported to this world like himself. Exploring the library, he is shown Typhon's memories after picking up a book titled after the Witch of Pride: raised by an executioner, she developed a twisted morality that gave her the power to shatter those who consider themselves a "sinner". Deducing that these "Books of the Dead" contain the deceased's memories, the group searches for one with the answers they seek, but finds nothing. Concurrently, Subaru attempts to bond with Meili, prompting the latter to reveal that she was abandoned by her parents and raised by mabeasts. Foxidna also deduces that the tower has rules, and Shaula is contracted to kill those who violate them: 1. They cannot leave before completing all the exams; 2. They cannot violate the rules; 3. They cannot vandalize the library; 4. They cannot damage the tower. Concluding that completing the exams is their only option, the group takes the second exam on the next floor: a duel against an individual materialized by the tower, who calls himself a "Stick Swinger".
72	6	"Julius Juukulius"; Transliteration: "Yuriusu Yūkuriusu" (Japanese: ユリウス・ユークリウス)	Daisuke Eguchi	Eiji Umehara	Goichi Iwahata & Masahiro Shinohara	May 13, 2026
Julius accepts the Stick Swinger's challenge but gets utterly defeated despite Foxidna attempting to support him with magic. Emilia then takes the exam and successfully lands a hit on the Stick Swinger when he lets his guard down, after which he announces that she passed and grants her access to the top floor. Afterward, with the others denied access until they pass as well, the group moves to another floor to discuss strategy, during which Shaula reveals the Stick Swinger's identity: the Astrea family ancestor—the original sword saint, Reid Astrea. Meanwhile, Julius slips away and retakes the exam only to be repeatedly beaten by Reid, plummeting his already-damaged self-worth after his name was eaten. In the end, Subaru arrives and takes the injured Julius back with him. While Julius initially rejects Subaru's aid, he ultimately relents when Subaru remains insistent about helping him.
73	7	"Walking Out of the Convenience Store and Into a Wondrous World"; Transliteration: "Konbini o Deru to, Soko wa Fushigi no Sekai Deshita" (Japanese: コンビニを出ると、そこは不思議の世界でした)	Kazuhiro Ozawa	Masahiro Yokotani	Kazuhiro Ozawa	May 20, 2026
After getting Julius' injuries treated, Subaru checks up on his companions and agrees to keep watch as they sleep, only to slumber away himself. Upon waking, he finds Foxidna is gone and eventually finds her atop a balcony by following one of the birds nesting at the tower. Now in private, the two openly proclaim they distrust each other; Subaru is wary of Foxidna because she is a copy of Echidna, and Foxidna is suspicious of Subaru's unknown origins. Julius then finds them and, having overheard their discussion about Anastasia's condition, demands an explanation. This prompts Foxidna to come clean to Julius, causing him to relent but also leaving him distraught about failing to notice his mistress's condition. After Julius and Foxidna take their leave, Subaru brainstorms ways to pass Reid's exam and rushes off somewhere after having an idea. The next day, Subaru is woken up by Emilia and Beatrice. However, he does not recognize them and then excitedly realizes that he is in another world, having seemingly lost all of his memories since being transported from Earth.
74	8	"Who Are You?"; Transliteration: "Omae wa Dareda" (Japanese: オマエハダレダ)	Hinako Masaki	Yoshiko Nakamura	Shinji Itadaki	May 27, 2026
Deducing from Emilia and Beatrice's reactions that he has amnesia, Subaru is nevertheless excited about being in another world. However, upon being reintroduced to his comrades, Julius and Ram are respectively devastated that he and Rem have now been forgotten by everyone. Foxidna also comes clean about herself and Anastasia's situation. Learning he had collapsed in the library, Subaru heads there to uncover the cause of his amnesia. However, on the way, someone pushes him down a staircase, killing him. Respawning when he woke, Subaru believes he had a prophetic dream and repeats the previous loop, but cannot find his attacker. However, upon regrouping with the others, he overhears them calling him a liability before someone once again pushes him down the stairs. Respawning again, Subaru becomes paranoid and runs away, only to get beaten up by Reid after accidentally entering his exam and being silenced by Satella when he talks about having died. After being found by Emilia and having his injuries healed, Subaru deduces Return by Death's mechanics and flees the tower, unknowingly breaking its rules. Meanwhile, in the library, Shaula suddenly collapses.
75	9	"Empty Shell"; Transliteration: "Zangai" (Japanese: 残骸)	Shinya Kawabe	Eiji Umehara	Shinji Itadaki	June 3, 2026
Subaru is attacked by mabeasts upon exiting the tower and gets rescued by Shaula. However, he subsequently falls into a sinkhole and momentarily blacks out. Waking up in the miasma-filled underground passage, he finds himself surrounded by mabeast corpses and now able to open four of its doors instead of the previous three before getting teleported back to the tower. Influenced by the miasma, the paranoid Subaru resolves to kill his companions. However, he comes to his senses upon discovering that Shaula, Ram, Julius, Meili, and Foxidna have all been killed, causing him to second-guess whether one of them was his attacker. The tower then starts getting destroyed as Subaru is mockingly confronted and beheaded from behind by a seemingly now-awake Rem. In the next loop, Subaru hides his amnesia and investigates his companions to find his attacker. However, Subaru blacks out again when Meili confronts him alone and awakens to discover that he strangled her to death before noticing the words "Subaru Natsuki was here" etched into his forearm.
76	10	"Murder Is a Habit"; Transliteration: "Satsujin wa Kuse ni Naru" (Japanese: 殺人は癖になる)	Masato Gotō	Masahiro Yokotani	Kei Oikawa	June 10, 2026
Believing the "real Subaru's" consciousness momentarily returned and killed Meili, Subaru hides her corpse before being confronted by Emilia, who has deduced something is wrong and tells him to confide in her. However, the others then inform them that the library has materialized Meili's Book of the Dead, revealing her fate. To hide his involvement, Subaru volunteers to read it: raised by mabeasts and recruited into an assassin organization by Elsa and their leader, Capella, Meili joined the expedition due to not knowing what to do anymore following her capture until last night, when an out-of-character Subaru told her to "follow her desires", culminating in him killing her after he began acting strange again when she attempted to continue their conversation. Afterward, Subaru is haunted by visions of Meili and briefly contemplates killing the others and reading their Books as well to find out what they truly think of him, but ultimately does not after Beatrice showcases concern for him. That night, Subaru checks on Meili's corpse to find that it is gone before being confronted by Ram, who has deduced that he is not the "real Subaru", causing him to consider killing her to protect his cover.
77	11	"Re:Zero − Starting Life in Another World"; Transliteration: "Ri:Zero kara Hajimaru Isekai Seikatsu" (Japanese: Re:ゼロから始まる異世界生活)	Yūdai Ishikawa	Yoshiko Nakamura	Kazuhiro Ozawa	June 17, 2026
Subaru reveals he has amnesia after getting restrained by Emilia when he attacked Ram. However, while Emilia believes him, Ram does not, leading the girls to fight. Getting knocked out in the crossfire, Subaru wakes up alone later to find the tower under attack by mabeasts. Julius faces them until Reid, who was confined to his exam but can now move freely, kills them all and resumes his duel with him. Subaru meets up with Beatrice and Foxidna before getting attacked by a scorpion mabeast, resulting in both girls being killed whilst driving it off. Concurrently, the imaginary Meili continues to mock Subaru. Satella then appears and begins to devour Subaru with her miasma, but Emilia saves him. However, Subaru has given up, admitting that his suspicions of the others were wrong and just wanting to die now. In response, Emilia tells him about everything they went through. However, he believes himself incapable of such accomplishments until she confesses her love to him, causing him to realize what had changed since coming to this world: he had fallen in love with Emilia. The miasma then devours them, killing them both. Subsequently, after respawning, Subaru vows to save everyone this time.

=== Recapture Arc ===
No. overall	No. in season	Title	Directed by	Written by	Storyboarded by	Original release date
78	12	"From Now On"; Transliteration: "Korekara no Hanashi" (Japanese: これからの話)	Tamaki Nakatsu	Eiji Umehara	Shinji Itadaki & Masahiro Shinohara	August 12, 2026
Starting his new loop, Subaru immediately reveals his amnesia to the others. While Ram initially does not believe him, Subaru realizes she is just distraught that everyone has now forgotten Rem and promises to wake her, earning her trust. Subaru then heads to the staircase and catches his attacker—Meili—when she tries to push him off, but he dodges. From reading her Book of the Dead in the previous loop, Subaru deduces that Meili was just acting on the "real Subaru's" words to "follow her desires" by living how Elsa taught her—by killing people—and he does not hold it against her. However, this causes Meili to snap, not knowing how to live without Elsa, before attempting suicide by jumping off the stairs herself. Fortunately, Subaru and Emilia, who secretly followed them, save her and promise to help her find a new way to live. Afterward, upon meeting back up with the others, Subaru proposes they hold off on recovering his memories and instead try to find Reid’s weakness by reading his Book of the Dead in the library, reasoning that his amnesia is likely related to the tower and they can find the cause by progressing through it.
79	13	"Stand Up"; Transliteration: "Tachi Nasai" (Japanese: 立ちなさい)	Hinako Masaki	Masahiro Yokotani	Masahiro Shinohara	August 19, 2026
En route to the library, Subaru gives the still insecure Julius a pep talk. Upon arriving, the group quickly finds Reid's Book and Subaru volunteers to read it. However, instead of experiencing his memories, he ends up in Od Lagna—the "world's cradle" where souls are "filtered" upon death—where he encounters the Sin Archbishop of Gluttony, Rui Arneb. Meanwhile, the tower is suddenly attacked by mabeasts led by Lye Batenkaitos, prompting the others into action. Back with Subaru, after Rui taunts him about his past and his deaths, he deduces that she ate his memories, which she admits to, and attacks. However, he backs off when she insinuates that his current self would vanish if his memories returned. Rui goes on to torment Subaru about the "real Subaru", nearly breaking him. However, Rem then confronts him and tells him to "stand up", causing him to regain his resolve. This enrages Rui, who wanted to turn the amnesiac Subaru into his own existence so she could eat his memories again but was foiled by a materialization of Rem's memories that she discarded. Subaru then returns to the tower when Rui reveals it is under attack, after which she throws a tantrum.
80	14	"Five Obstacles"; Transliteration: "Itsutsu no Shōgai" (Japanese: 五つの障害)	Shinya Kawabe	Yoshiko Nakamura	Shinji Itadaki	August 26, 2026
Regaining consciousness in the library, Subaru learns about the mabeast attack and that Lye has infiltrated the tower. Discovering that Lye has eaten Emilia's name, Subaru and the others come to her aid, but it turns into a three-way battle when a third obstacle arrives: Reid. Concurrently, Subaru begins experiencing weird pains in his chest until a fourth obstacle appears: the scorpion mabeast. He then dies when the entire tower is devoured by the miasma of a final, fifth obstacle: Satella. Respawning after his return from Od Lagna, Subaru intercepts Lye with Beatrice and Ram before he eats Emilia's name after he sends Shaula and Meili to deal with the mabeasts while Julius occupies Reid. During the battle, Subaru's pains are revealed to be the Authority of Greed manifesting, awakening a sixth sense that tracks his allies. The scorpion then appears again and kills Lye, with Subaru realizing through his new power that the mabeast is actually a transformed Shaula. While Subaru, Emilia, Beatrice, and Ram drive Shaula off, Julius and Reid then crash in, and the knight reveals that the sword saint is holding the third and final Gluttony, Roy Alphard, inside him.
81	15	"A Single-Minded Star"; Transliteration: "Ichizuna Hoshi" (Japanese: 一途な星)	Hidekazu Hara	Eiji Umehara	Hidekazu Hara & Masayuki Kojima	September 2, 2026
Julius explains that Roy consumed Reid, but the latter was too strong and took control of the Sin Archbishop's body; thus, he can now leave his exam. Reid then overpowers Subaru and the others before Satella appears and destroys the tower, culminating in Reid killing Subaru. After respawning, Subaru has the others deal with the enemy as he converses with Shaula, who explains that the scorpion is a form she is contracted to assume to kill rulebreakers. Told the tower's rules, Subaru deduces Shaula is concealing a fifth rule for fear of being alone again after he and the others leave and has her reveal it: 5. The exams themselves can be destroyed. Shaula then involuntarily transforms due to a rule violation, and Subaru vows to save her before committing suicide. Over the next fifteen loops, Subaru tries to prevent Reid from consuming Roy and defeat Lye, but continuously fails. At his sixteenth respawn, Beatrice sees he is unwell and has him rest while the others face the enemy. This leaves him feeling inadequate compared to the "real Subaru" before sensing something through his Authority of Greed, which leads him to find his own Book of the Dead.
82	16	"Subaru Natsuki"; Transliteration: "Natsuki Subaru" (Japanese: ナツキ・スバル)	Kazuhiro Ozawa	Masahiro Yokotani	Kazuhiro Ozawa	September 9, 2026
Subaru finds a series of Books of the Dead storing the "real Subaru's" deaths and reads them to uncover what made him special. However, he finds nothing and, after reading the Book from the loop where he lost his memories, gets transported back to Od Lagna, where he meets the "real Subaru". The amnesiac Subaru demands the "real Subaru" tell him how he continuously saved his comrades, but he just claims it is because he loves them. Realizing they are no different, the amnesiac Subaru calls his counterpart amazing and recombines with him. The reunited Subaru Natsuki then faces the one possessing him: a clone of Rui. After reading Reid's Book and ending up in Od Lagna, Subaru encountered Rui, who had the clone possess him to experience Return by Death, causing his amnesia. Now bereft of Subaru's willpower, the clone is traumatized by his deaths and expels him from Od Lagna. The real Rui then appears to recombine with the clone, but she fears for her life and resists, resulting in the two cannibalizing each other. Meanwhile, back at the tower, Subaru goes to support Emilia, who is overjoyed upon realizing he has regained his memories.
83	17	"Good Loser"; Transliteration: "Guddo Rūzā" (Japanese: グッドルーザー)	Akihisa Shibata & Hinako Masaki	Eiji Umehara	Takaharu Ozaki	September 16, 2026
After driving Lye off, Subaru and Emilia reunite with the others. Though unable to prevent Emilia's name from being eaten, Subaru concludes that Satella won't appear anymore now that Rui, who learned about Return by Death, is gone. A rule violation then forces Shaula into her scorpion form, and Subaru splits the group: he, Beatrice, and Meili distract Shaula, Ram confronts Lye, and Emilia goes to the tower's peak to take the final exam. Concurrently, Foxidna goes to support Julius, who is still dueling Reid. From Reid's taunts, Julius realizes what has been restraining him: since losing his name, he has clung to his former identity, but he now accepts that he must move forward, breaking and subsequently reforging his spirit contract. Julius then defeats Reid, who could not use his full strength in Roy's body, leaving the Sin Archbishop's body behind. Meanwhile, having deduced that Anastasia switched places with her to avoid forgetting Julius, Foxidna speaks to her in their mind and convinces her to return, causing her to forget Julius but also allowing the two to start over. Elsewhere, atop the tower, Emilia finds that the final exam's overseer is Lugunica's guardian beast: the Divine Dragon, Volcanica.
84	18	"Ram"; Transliteration: "Ramu" (Japanese: ラム)	Tamaki Nakatsu	Yoshiko Nakamura	Tetsuya Miyanishi	September 23, 2026
Emilia finds Volcanica unresponsive until she notices something behind him and approaches it, prompting the Divine Dragon to attack her. Meanwhile, Subaru, Beatrice, and Meili draw Shaula into the mabeast horde outside the tower, but one of her attacks injures Meili. Elsewhere, inside the tower, Ram engages Lye and pushes him back with her oni powers; Subaru's Authority of Greed—Cor Leonis—which also lets him take on his allies' burdens, reduces the fatigue of utilizing them without her horn. In response, Lye assumes the appearances and abilities of the people he has eaten, including Rem, while targeting the real Rem. With Subaru forced to redirect Cor Leonis onto the injured Meili, Lye overpowers and seemingly defeats Ram. However, using a magical connection she shares with her twin, Ram channels her oni powers through Rem, allowing her to defeat Lye with ease. Lye flees, regurgitating all the memories and names he has eaten along the way, as he realizes he has developed a crush on Ram before being decapitated by her mid-confession, killing the Sin Archbishop. Back atop the tower, as she fights Volcanica, Emilia sees what he is protecting: a monolith inscribed with multiple handprints.
85	19	"Shaula"; Transliteration: "Shaura" (Japanese: シャウラ)	Masahiro Shinohara, Kazue Otsuki & Yūsuke Maruyama	Masahiro Yokotani	Masahiro Shinohara	September 30, 2026
85	19	"Hero"; Transliteration: "Eiyū" (Japanese: 英雄)	Masahiro Shinohara, Kazue Otsuki & Yūsuke Maruyama	Masahiro Yokotani	Masahiro Shinohara	September 30, 2026
Subaru and Beatrice treat the injured Meili, but Shaula defeats the mabeast horde and begins pressuring them. Fortunately, Julius comes to their aid. Meanwhile, atop the tower, Emilia deduces that touching the monolith as Volcanica tries to stop her is the final exam and, with Ram's help, does so, clearing the tower. Unfortunately, with the tower's rules no longer applying, Shaula goes berserk, forcing Subaru and his companions to fight her. Shaula is ultimately subdued, but she is too injured and begins fading away. Still, Shaula tells Subaru she is satisfied with this outcome, continuing to mistake him for Flügel, leaving only a tiny scorpion housing her soul behind. When everyone meets up, Lye's death is revealed to have returned Emilia's name, but Rem remains comatose. Also, Julius sealed away the unconscious Roy. Subaru recuperates when an unconscious Rui inexplicably emerges from Od Lagna, causing Satella to appear and begin destroying the tower. Fortunately, Volcanica drives her away. Afterward, Subaru finds himself transported to an open plain with Rem, who then suddenly wakes up. Subaru is overjoyed until Rem asks who he is, revealing she has amnesia. In response, Subaru introduces himself and declares himself her "hero".

== Home media release ==
=== Japanese ===
Kadokawa Corporation (Japan – Region 2/A)
Vol.	Episodes	Break Time	Cover character(s)	Release date
1	67–70	53–56	Shaula	July 24, 2026
2	71–74	57–60	Julius Juukulius and Reid Astrea	August 26, 2026
3	75–78	61–64	Subaru Natsuki	September 25, 2026
4	79–82	65–68	Rui Arneb	October 28, 2026
5	83–85	69–71	TBA	November 27, 2026
