= Alderano =

Alderano is a given name. Notable people with the name include:

- Alderano Cybo-Malaspina (1552–1606), an Italian nobleman, Crown prince of Massa and Carrara
- Alderano Cybo (1613–1700), an Italian Catholic Cardinal
- Alderano I Cybo-Malaspina (1690–1731), an Italian nobleman, Duke of Massa and Carrara.

The name Alderan may refer to:

- Alderan, a character in the Hungarian epic poem The Siege of Sziget
- the fictional Aldaran family in the Darkover series of books

== See also ==
- Alderaan (disambiguation)
