= Italian ship Aldebaran =

Aldebaran was the name of at least two ships of the Italian Navy and may refer to:

- Italian torpedo boat Aldebaran, a Spica-class torpedo boat launched in 1936 and sunk in 1941.
- Italian frigate Aldebaran (F 590), a Cannon-class destroyer escort launched in 1943 as USS Thornhill. Transferred to Italy and renamed in 1951. Re-rated as a frigate in 1957 and scrapped in 1976.
