= List of Re:Zero characters =

The central characters of the series. First row, from left: Subaru Natsuki, Emilia, and Puck. Second row, from left: Ram, Rem, and Felt.

The light novel Re:Zero and its derivative anime and manga adaptations feature a cast of characters created by Tappei Nagatsuki and designed by Shinichirou Otsuka.

== Main characters ==
Subaru Natsuki (ナツキ・スバル, Natsuki Subaru)

Voiced by (English): Sean Chiplock
Voiced by (Japanese): Yūsuke Kobayashi
The main protagonist of the series, Subaru is a 17-year-old NEET who suddenly finds himself teleported to another world on his way home from the convenience store. There, he meets a silver-haired half-elf girl named Emilia, and falls deeply in love with her. Upon his arrival, Subaru acquires an ability which he calls "Return by Death" (死に戻り, Shinimodori), that allows him to go back in time when he dies, while still retaining his memories of the previous timeline.
Emilia (エミリア, Emiria)

Voiced by (English): Kayli Mills
Voiced by (Japanese): Rie Takahashi
The main heroine, Emilia is a silver-haired half-elf girl and a Spirit Art User; she is one of the candidates to become the next ruler in the royal election, which would make her the 42nd Queen of Lugunica. Subaru first meets her when her insignia, which she needs to possess in order to be eligible to participate in the election, is stolen by Felt. She is from the Frozen Forest, and is over a hundred years old (although most of the time she was frozen in the forest). Her mental state is still that of a teenager. The name Emilia first used when introducing herself to Subaru, "Satella", is also the name of the "Witch of Envy", whose appearance is said to resemble her own and is responsible for the discrimination against half-elves. Among the half breeds and other discriminated or disenfranchised races and people in Lugunica, she is seen as their hope for a better future due to her ideal of democracy and better social equality. Because of her heritage and resemblance to Satella, however, Emilia is often shunned and hated by most people, leaving her lonely and without any friends prior to meeting Subaru. Initially, she regards Subaru as a mischievous child who always needs to be taken care of. After he risks his life to save her from the Witch's Cult, however, Emilia starts to develop deep feelings for him, as Subaru is the first person to ever make her feel truly happy, accepted and loved.

== Supporting characters ==
=== Emilia's Faction ===
Puck (パック, Pakku)
Voiced by (English): Erica Mendez
Voiced by (Japanese): Yumi Uchiyama
Emilia's familiar and a spirit in the form of a cat. His work time is from 9 a.m. to 5 p.m., similar to a salaryman's. He has an empathic ability that allows him to read people's minds through their emotions/intent. Should Emilia ever die, Puck turns into a huge beast intent on destroying the world, since Emilia, the purpose of his existence, is gone. His true identity is that of "Beast of the End of the Eternally Frozen Lands", one of 4 Great Spirits of the world who can control heat.
The character won the award for Best Character (Mascot) in the 2015–2016 Newtype Anime Awards.
Roswaal L. Mathers (ロズワール・L・メイザース, Rozuwāru L Meizāsu)
Voiced by (English): Ray Chase
Voiced by (Japanese): Takehito Koyasu
A Margrave, as well as an Imperial Wizard and Count who is a benefactor and sponsor for Emilia's bid for the throne. He has an appearance and affect that lead to Subaru initially mistaking him for a clown. He is a highly influential individual who is also one of Lugunica's most powerful mages. It is revealed that his reason for supporting Emilia is for him to kill the Dragon. It is eventually revealed that he is actually far older than he appears, having possessed the bodies of his descendants in hopes of living long enough to revive Echidna, his master and the love of his life.
Rem (レム, Remu)

Voiced by (English): Brianna Knickerbocker
Voiced by (Japanese): Inori Minase
One of the twin demons who work at Roswaal's mansion as maids, Rem is Ram's twin sister. She has blue hair which she wears parted on the left, and still has a full horn, which grants her magical power. She does work at the mansion, although her ability to cook is better than her sister. She used to have an inferiority complex towards her sister. Bearing an intense hatred for the Witch's Cult, Rem initially hates Subaru for having the scent of the Witch on him and kills him. After Subaru saves her from the mabeasts of Elior Forest, however, Rem discards her suspicions and falls deeply in love with him, and even when he turns her down in favor of Emilia, she still becomes one of his most loyal followers. An extra story in Arc 3 of the novel tells a "What If" story about what could've happened if Subaru and Rem had decided to run away instead; they lived happily ever after with two children.
The character has become popular with fans of the series, leading to a hug pillow featuring the character being delayed due to unanticipated demand. She was also the eighth ranked female character in the August issue of Newtype's monthly character polls, and fifth ranked in the September issue, before rising to first place in the October issue. Her rank began to decline after that, slipping to third and then seventh place in the November and December issues. She won the award for Best Character (Female) in the 2015–2016 Newtype Anime Awards, as well as first place on a list of "most popular two-dimensional character" based on a poll of Otamart users.
The character won the Best Girl award at The Anime Awards 2016.
Ram (ラム, Ramu)
Voiced by (English): Ryan Bartley
Voiced by (Japanese): Rie Murakawa
One of the demons who work at Roswaal's mansion as maids, Ram is Rem's twin sister. She has pink hair which she wears parted on the right. Together, the twins often make sarcastic remarks towards Subaru. Ram always calls Subaru "Barusu", and rarely shows any respect for him. Despite twins being prohibited in their clan, the two were spared due to Ram being a prodigy at a young age. She lost her powers after her horn was cut off during the attack on their village by the Witch's Cult. Outside of magic, Ram only excels Rem in cleaning, whereas Rem is far superior to Ram in almost all other tasks, contrary to Rem's constant praise of Ram. Ever since losing her horn, her body has become very weak with low stamina and magic powers. It is shown that master Roswaal helps heal her daily.
Beatrice (ベアトリス, Beatorisu)
Voiced by (English): Kira Buckland
Voiced by (Japanese): Satomi Arai
A mysterious girl who was contracted by Roswaal to keep his ancient magical tomes safe in his enormous library. She has the ability to warp any room in the mansion to this library whenever she chooses, but cannot completely leave the mansion. She tends to suffix many of her sentences with "I suppose", and has a deep affection for Puck. Despite her cold behavior and verbal abuse towards Subaru, stemming from his ability to easily guess where she is located and tendency to barge into the library without asking, Beatrice cannot stand if people are hurt in front of her and becomes one of the people that Subaru can trust. During Arc 4 of the web novel, she is revealed to be an artificial spirit and forms a contract with Subaru at the end. She is about four hundred years old.
Garfiel Tinzel (ガーフィール・ティンゼル, Gāfīru Tinzeru)
Voiced by (English): Zeno Robinson
Voiced by (Japanese): Nobuhiko Okamoto
Garfiel Tinzel is a demi-human who guards the Sanctuary and is Frederica Baumann's half-brother with both of them having the same mother. He serves as a secondary antagonist in the first half of Arc 4, but later joins the Emilia Camp after his defeat at the hands of Subaru and getting over his past.
Frederica Baumann (フレデリカ・バウマン, Furederica Bauman)
Voiced by (English): Dawn M. Bennett; Faye Mata (episode 11)
Voiced by (Japanese): Kaori Nazuka
A demi-human maid who works in another mansion that belongs to relatives of Roswaal, House Miload. She made a cameo appearance in episode 11. She returns to the Roswaal mansion at the beginning of Arc 4 to fill in for the erased Rem. She left the Sanctuary ten years prior to the events of Arc 4, in order to find a safe haven for the citizens of the Sanctuary if and when the barrier surrounding the Sanctuary is lifted.
Patrasche (パトラッシュ, Patorasshe)
Voiced by (English): Erik Scott Kimerer
Voiced by (Japanese): Kouichi Souma
Subaru's female black Land/Ground Dragon which he received as a gift from Crusch. It's of the Diana breed which are known for their fierce temperament and strong pride. Surprisingly enough though, she has taken quite a liking to Subaru, sometimes in a maternal like way.
Otto Suwen (オットー・スーウェン, Ottō Sūwen)
Voiced by (English): Zach Aguilar
Voiced by (Japanese): Kōhei Amasaki
A traveling merchant Subaru meets in Arc 3 en route to Roswaal's territory, who was drunk and down on his luck. While he can be somewhat skittish and cowardly he's generally a well meaning person and very loyal to those who earned his friendship. In the light novel, he states out of all the candidates Otto supports Emilia the most because, like her, he is used to being misunderstood and treated badly for being different. He has a blessing that allows him to communicate with any animal, plant or being in the world. Unfortunately, this tends to unsettle people and makes him come across as shady and sinister when it is in use. He joins Emilia's camp in Arc 4 and helps to defeat Garfiel.
Petra Leyte (ペトラ・レイテ, Petora Reite)
Voiced by (English): Erica Mendez
Voiced by (Japanese): Marika Kōno
One of the village children whom Subaru befriends, who planned to become a seamstress in the capital one day. She develops a crush on him after he saves her and the village twice, and later works as a maid in Roswaal's mansion to fill in for Rem in the 4th Arc becoming an official member.

=== Ruler Candidates ===
Felt (フェルト, Feruto)
Voiced by (English): Christine Marie Cabanos
Voiced by (Japanese): Chinatsu Akasaki
A 15-year-old thief who grew up in the slums of the capital. She initially appeared as a thief who stole Emilia's insignia and attempted to sell it to the highest bidder. Subsequently, Emilia's insignia reacted to her, making Felt a worthy candidate for the next ruler in royal election. Due to her difficult upbringing, Felt supports anarchism in order to destroy the current system. It is later revealed that she might be related to the royal family due to her appearance resembling them, but there is no way to confirm this because all of them are currently deceased. It is later revealed in arc 5 that Felt is not her real name.
Priscilla Barielle (プリシラ・バーリエル, Purishira Bārieru)
Voiced by (English): Faye Mata
Voiced by (Japanese): Yukari Tamura
One of the candidates for the royal election to become the 42nd Queen of Lugunica and head of House Barielle. Men are captivated by her beauty. Priscilla has an extravagant self-centered personality and supports totalitarianism where everyone must treat her with divinity, because of how much the world turns into her favor. Even though she is only 19, Priscilla had 8 husbands who have all "mysteriously" died; despite that, lands she has acquired have prospered under her thanks to her almost supernatural good luck.
Anastasia Hoshin (アナスタシア・ホーシン, Anasutashia Hōshin)
Voiced by (English): Cassandra Lee Morris
Voiced by (Japanese): Kana Ueda
One of the candidates for the royal election to become the 42nd Queen of Lugunica, who speaks in "Kansai" dialect. She is the 22-year-old head of the famous Hoshin Trading Company and has been billed as second coming of the company's founder "Hoshin of the Wilderness" for her near unprecedented success in business, which she hopes to use for Lugunica via capitalism. Anastasia likes it when people benefit while she benefits, despite her greed as an orphan, and is actually sympathetic. She hails from Kararagi, which lies west of Lugunica and has a personal mercenary company known as the "Iron Fang".
Crusch Karsten (クルシュ・カルステン, Kurushu Karusuten)
Voiced by (English): Erika Harlacher
Voiced by (Japanese): Yuka Iguchi
A 20-year-old woman and one of the candidates for the royal election to become the 42nd Queen of Lugunica. Despite her age, Crusch has become the family head of House Karsten, who are known to have strong ties to the late royal family and has become quite well known as one of the most upcoming prominent women in Lugunica. She has a blessing that allows her to tell when someone is lying, and thus, is not easily fooled. Crusch's ideal is meritocracy, and to free the country from the centuries long heavy dependency on the Dragon's guidance which she believes has led Lugunica into stagnation and stripped the country's will to govern without it, betraying the hopes of the conservative ruling class who pin her as favorite to win the election. She has the pride of being a warrior, but with a dense and strict personality.

=== Candidate Knights ===
Reinhard van Astrea (ラインハルト・ヴァン・アストレア, Rainharuto van Asutorea)
Voiced by (English): Robbie Daymond
Voiced by (Japanese): Yūichi Nakamura
An easygoing Royal Guard knight and holder of the title "Sword Saint", who easily becomes friends with Subaru. He exhibits extraordinary powers in combat, and is stronger than all of his predecessors due to his unique ability to generate magical countermeasures to whatever his opponents past or present use. After discovering that Emilia's insignia reacted to Felt, Reinhard becomes Felt's knight for the royal election. He is, stated directly by the author, the most powerful character in the world of the series.
Felix Argyle (フェリックス・アーガイル, Ferikkusu Āgairu) A.K.A. Ferris (フェリス, Ferisu)
Voiced by (English): Sarah Anne Williams
Voiced by (Japanese): Yui Horie
Crusch's knight and member of the Royal Guard, who is skilled in Water Magic, which includes healing, and refuses to use a sword. Despite having a feminine and cat-like appearance, Felix is a male. He often speaks in the third person, using female pronouns for himself; despite this, he has stated that he is "in body and in soul, I am a man". A "Beast Human" hybrid, Ferris was locked up at birth, and later rescued by Crusch herself. The author of Re:Zero has stated in a twitter reply that Ferris's "女の子っぽい" [Girl-like] behavior is a result of his and Crusch's promise they made a long time ago.
Julius Juukulius (ユリウス・ユークリウス, Yuriusu Yūkuriusu)
Voiced by (English): Chris Niosi (anime); Alejandro Saab (The Prophecy of the Throne)
Voiced by (Japanese): Takuya Eguchi
Anastasia's knight, member of the Royal Guard and a type of Spirit Arts user known as a "Spirit Knight". He has a strict side for nobility, leading him to put those without respect in their place. As such, it seems that Julius initially looks down on Subaru, considering him not worthy to be called a knight, but his actions of brutally beating Subaru in a one-sided duel Julius ended up tarnishing his knight status and reputation. But after Subaru's realization on his own faults, and his successful exploits at subjugating the White Whale (a great mabeast many knights sought to kill), Julius reveals his true face and develops a deep respect for Subaru, becoming one of his trustworthy allies and friends. Julius is contracted to six Quasi Spirits; each representing an element which are "Ia" (Fire), "Kua" (Water)、"Aro" (Wind), "Ik" (Earth), "In" (Light), and "Nes" (Shadow).
Aldebaran (アルデバラン, Arudebaran) a.k.a. Al (アル, Aru)
Voiced by (English): Keith Silverstein
Voiced by (Japanese): Keiji Fujiwara (anime); Tomokazu Seki (The Prophecy of the Throne)
Priscilla's knight who is known as Al for short. Like Subaru, he is a normal person summoned from a different world 18 years ago. Before being enlisted by Priscilla, he worked as a gladiator in the Vollachia Empire which is located in the south of Lugunica, and became a wanderer for a time. Al wears a helmet to hide his heavily scarred and disfigured face. It is hinted that he may have some sort of history with Ram. His age is around the late 30s.

=== Other Faction members ===
==== Felt's Faction ====
Old-Man Rom (ロム爺, Romu-ji)
Voiced by (English): Beau Billingslea (anime); Richard Brown (The Prophecy of the Throne)
Voiced by (Japanese): Mugihito
Valga Cromwell, also known as Rom, is a giant and Felt's longtime caretaker, who is like a grandfather to her. He runs a tavern and has a storehouse full of stolen goods. Rom was born and raised as the slave of a noble, but he was saved by Libre, and since then he fostered a hatred of humans. He was one of the three commanders of the Demi-human Alliance during the Demi-human War, serving as the chief staff officer. He fought against Wilhelm and Bordeaux at Lugnica castle and lost. He subsequently got lost underground and managed to survive, later becoming the owner of the Stolen Goods Warehouse.

==== Priscilla's Faction ====
Schult (シュルト, Shuruto)
As his body is still developing, Schult's voice is high pitched like a child. He is absolutely loyal to Priscilla.

==== Anastasia's Faction ====
Ricardo Welkin (リカード・ウェルキン, Rikādo Werukin)
Voiced by (English): Imari Williams
Voiced by (Japanese): Kenji Nomura
One of Anastasia's followers, and the jovial Captain of the mercenary group Iron Fang. He is a large kobold with a muscular build and is covered with short brown body fur with an oblong, dark-brown mane which he adorns as a mohican. Ricardo is usually laid back and outgoing, and he talks in a loud voice which sounds like a heavy wind blowing by. As the captain of the Iron Fang, he usually calms his teammates down right before battling, such as making jokes to make others laugh. Like Anastasia, Ricardo speaks with a Kansai dialect. Ricardo was formerly a slave until he met Anastasia and she pledged that she would remove his collar one day, which had been left as a reminder of what he had been. Ricardo would remember her pledge from that moment on.
Mimi Pearlbaton (ミミ・パールバトン, Mimi Pārubaton)
Voiced by (English): Erica Mendez
Voiced by (Japanese): Yukiyo Fujii
One of Anastasia's followers, and one of the vice captains of the mercenary group Iron Fang. She is the eldest of the triplets. The siblings were abandoned by their parents and were taken in by Anastasia and Ricardo, who they've lived with ever since. Mimi has a bright and optimistic personality with straightforward intentions. She typically acts like a child, often causing problems for her brothers Hetaro and Tivey. She considers the other members of the Fang of Iron to be family and loves them, referring to Ricardo as their father, though as it's her own unique way of loving others it tends to cause problems especially for her brothers.
Hetaro Pearlbaton (ヘータロー・パールバトン, Hētarō Pārubaton)
Voiced by (English): Kira Buckland
Voiced by (Japanese): Megumi Han
One of Anastasia's followers, and one of the captains of the mercenary group Iron Fang. He is the second oldest of the triplets and the responsible one. The siblings were abandoned by their parents and were taken in by Anastasia and Ricardo, who they've lived with ever since. Hetaro has a more cautious personality, which comes from his experiences of taking care of his sister. As he is a siscon, he generally tends to let his sister do whatever she wants, leading her to grow into her current personality, though because of this he is attentive and is sensitive to changes in mood. Despite this, he is also on good terms with his younger brother Tivey, who listens to what he has to say. Due to Ricardo's habit of heading straight into the battle, he is virtually the commander of the Iron Fang while in battle.
Tivey Pearlbaton (ティビー・パールバトン, Tibī Pārubaton)
Voiced by (English): Julie Ann Taylor
Voiced by (Japanese): Hiroki Shimowada
One of Anastasia's followers, and treasurer of the mercenary group Iron Fang. The youngest of the triplets, he wears a monocle over his left eye. The siblings were abandoned by their parents and were taken in by Anastasia and Ricardo, who they've lived with ever since. Contrary to their love of the outdoors, he prefers to stay indoors and gain knowledge, such as reading books in the corner, though even then he is bothered by Mimi. He is in charge of the Iron Fang's clerical duties, which he excels at to the point where it's said that the mercenary group would not function correctly without him. Because of this, he sometimes helps Anastasia with her business, however he refuses her offers to have him permanently move to her company.
Joshua Juukulius (ヨシュア・ユークリウス, Yoshua Yuukuriusu)
Voiced by (Japanese): Shōya Ishige
He is Julius Juukulius' younger brother. Unlike his brother Julius, Joshua does not have the same composed personality, as shown when he gets flustered with the antics of the Emilia Camp members. Despite this, he has a serious yet amiable personality. He respects his brother to the utmost degree and cannot stop when he starts talking about him. Joshua was born sickly until he was 14 and has not learned combat skill because of this. His Name and Memories are eaten by Roy Alphard in Arc 5.

==== Crusch's Faction ====
Wilhelm van Astrea (ヴィルヘルム・ヴァン・アストレア, Viruherumu van Asutorea)
Voiced by (English): Marc Diraison (season 1), Brock Foster Powell (season 2; The Prophecy of the Throne), Billy Kametz (young)
Voiced by (Japanese): Kenyu Horiuchi, Kaito Ishikawa (young)
Reinhard's grandfather and Crusch's butler who is a retired member of the Royal Guard. Despite his age, Wilhelm is still known as one of the best swordsmen in Lugunica, nicknamed "Sword Demon" for his prowess and accomplishments in the civil war. A wise and perceptive man, he could tell from seeing Subaru's eyes that he had experienced death. He holds a strong grudge against the White Whale for killing his wife, Theresia van Astrea. The story of Wilhelm and his first encounter with Theresia is told in the light novel's spin-off. His former surname was Trias.

=== Witches of Sin ===
Satella (サテラ, Satera)
Voiced by (English): Kayli Mills
Voiced by (Japanese): Rie Takahashi
She is the Witch of Envy and the main figure of worship of the Witch Cult. She is believed to be responsible for bringing Subaru to the parallel world and for his "Return by Death" ability. 400 years earlier, Satella absorbed Envy Witch Genes which she had no compatibility with, resulting in the creation of her Witch of Envy personality, subsequently going out of control and killing the six other Witches of Sin, while nearly destroying the world. Despite the efforts of many, including the Dragon, the first Sword Saint, and the Sage, Satella could not be killed and was instead sealed in a shrine at the Grand Cascade that is currently being watched over by the Sage. Infamously known for being a silver-haired half-elf girl, Satella's past actions resulted in severe prejudice and discrimination against half-breeds, especially half-elves like Emilia, due to her own strong resemblance to the Witch.
Echidna (エキドナ, Ekidona)
Voiced by (English): Anairis Quiñones
Voiced by (Japanese): Maaya Sakamoto
She is the Witch of Greed. She is one of the primary characters in the fourth arc of the series. Echidna's curiosity toward the unknown and her thirst for knowledge are the two things that define her behavior. She refers to it as love, and currently directs those feelings toward Subaru's Return by Death, which she is interested to the point that she longs to become his advisor to record the many possibilities created from his ability. Described as being black hearted, she cannot understand the feelings of others, and can be seen as a sociopath by normal standards. In order to get ahold of more knowledge, she has no problems with employing sophistry, lying, and deceiving others. However, she interacts with ill will only toward three people in the world: Satella, Emilia, and one other person.
Minerva (ミネルヴァ, Mineruva)
Voiced by (English): Skyler Davenport
Voiced by (Japanese): Mikako Komatsu
She is the Witch of Wrath. She is one of the primary characters in the fourth arc of the series. Minerva does not like conflict as she always lamented it while healing people. She also only cares about what is in front of her, stating that she did not care about what she cannot see, such as the side effects of her ability, though she will immediately head off to address it once her current problem is dealt with as long as there are injured people. She is seen being prideful of her work. In the past, people in the world around Minerva were constantly fighting, causing her to cry. Eventually, she realized that crying would not solve anything and decided to train herself in order to gain enough power to be a deterrent to fighting, though that still did not change anything. As she fought, she came to understand that she'd been crying out of rage and not sorrow, causing her to start punching people, resulting in their wounds being healed. From that moment on, she traveled the world to heal people wherever she found people in need.
Carmilla (カーミラ, Kāmira)
Voiced by (English): Lisa Reimold
Voiced by (Japanese): Manaka Iwami
She is the Witch of Lust. She is one of the primary characters in the fourth arc of the series. Carmilla has extremely low self confidence, often having downcast eyes and overall acts very timid. She tends to stutter and question her own words, more often than not ticking other people off by doing so. She speaks in a very polite manner, trying not to cause any disagreements or disapproval. At times, she shows a rather submissive side of her, when dealing with her fellow Witches of Sin, as seen when she had no problem in taking part of Echidna's scheme to lure Subaru into her castle of dreams, despite knowing it will end badly for her. Due to her timid personality and low self confidence, she is frequently seen shying away from stern gazes, often pleading people not to hit her or exercise any form of violence towards her which likely stems from her past bad experiences with other people. In the past, Carmilla was the reason why her village, the neighboring villages and cities and even the great country she lived in, were engulfed in the flames of war. Everyone desired and loved her but she desired none of it, hence she left everything and everyone behind in search of the love she lost. A long time ago, Carmilla was a normal girl who was loved by the people in her village, and even had a fiancé. However, one day a man of power came to the man and desired her. Angered by the man's actions, the villagers rose up in defiance and fought against him, eventually burning him down along with his mansion. The cities and villages around theirs began to regard them as dangerous, causing the fighting to spread, and soon their force was toppling countries, all the while claiming that it was for her sake. Carmilla began to be regarded as a heavenly maiden, nevertheless she did not desire such a thing, and saw that they were being misled by their own fantasies and manipulated by their ideals. After they had toppled a large country, her fiancé proposed to her at the top of the castle, though she ignored him and left everything behind, despairing that what she had originally wanted no longer existed.
Daphne (ダフネ, Dafune)
Voiced by (English): Michelle Marie
Voiced by (Japanese): Nao Tōyama
She is the Witch of Gluttony. As the Witch of Gluttony, Daphne's reason for living is to feel full, causing her to care about the amount more than taste. She was also seen repeatedly vomiting out food and eating it again, although she seems to indulge in such acts only when there is no more food left. If that option fails, she will resort to eating objects she can chew, like rugs, curtains, clothes, etc. In an effort to try and get rid of the never ending hunger, she created the Demon Beasts but soon after lost control of them and accidentally released them into the world. Despite the threat the Demon Beasts present, they were created with a positive mindset – to save the world from hunger. Her view on hunger is bizarre and weird, stating that those who try to eat others should be wary of being eaten themselves, therefore she was unable to comprehend Subaru's counterarguments to her theory. A long time ago, a man was afflicted with an incurable disease, and, as he was afraid of dying, he began using various methods to try and prolong his life. Daphne was one of the many people he used in his experiments, and eventually he succeeded in achieving his goal by using her body. In his joy, he forcibly undid her binds, and when she came to her senses she found herself all alone in the man's castle, suffering from hunger. To satisfy her hunger, she began eating everything in the castle, including things like the throne and the carpets, and resorted to eating what she threw up when necessary. As she was immortal, she could not die, however she felt like she was going to die from hunger. Eventually, she somehow began creating Demon Beasts in the castle, which she considered to be illusions at the time, and started to use them as a food source. After a while, her binds broke from the fighting between her and the beasts, allowing her to leave the castle.
Typhon (テュフォン, Tyufon)
Voiced by (English): Kimberley Anne Campbell
Voiced by (Japanese): Misaki Kuno
She is the Witch of Pride. Typhon acts really child-like, which reflects on her actual age, often doing things on impulse, not reading the mood properly and rarely listening to other people. She has trouble understanding heavier, philosophical topics, as seen when she did not understand Subaru's view on "good" and "bad" people. Her replies sometimes tend to be younger than expected for a 10 year old child. She shows heavy interest in people's "sins", more often than not disregarding topics and entire conversations (often important) in order to figure out if a person is an "evildoer" or not. She shows little to no compassion for people who she regards as evildoers however, she feels solicitude towards people who are not evildoers but have a guilty conscience, even though she is perfectly capable of killing them. She is said to have judged criminals with the innocence and ruthlessness of a child, which stemmed from her past of watching her father execute people, in order to find an answer about the concept of good and evil. This later resulted in her killing her own father, alongside other members of her village. Her view on the world is described as easygoing and bizarre, completely different from what you would expect from a 10 year old girl. When Typhon was a young girl, she was troubled with the concept of good and evil, and tended to watch her father execute people as a part of his job to find an answer. One day, she broke his wine cup, prompting her to confess her deed to him while fearing execution, though fortunately he accepted her apology, leading her to believe that the scale that measured a person's sin was inside of their own heart. Ever since then, Typhon began asking people if they were sinners, and brought down punishment to those that were guilty.

Sekhmet (セクメト, Sekumeto)
Voiced by (English): Nicole Gose
Voiced by (Japanese): Mai Nakahara
She is the Witch of Sloth. True to her position as the Witch of Sloth, Sekhmet's personality can be summed up in one word, lazy, which can also be seen through her appearance. She is also lazy enough that she finds breathing even once to be a pain and gives off a gloomy atmosphere. Before she was born, Sekhmet's clan expected things from her, wanting to bring back their founder known as God. However, after she was born, she disappointed them, causing them to hold her in disdain and abandon her as punishment. Many years later, upon hearing of a wild woman in the mountains, men came and captured her, taking her down to the city. While there, she gained knowledge, a way of life, and emotions. Eventually, not understanding at the time that what she felt was gratitude and obligation, she snapped the necks of the men in the place she lived in and left. Returning to her homeland, she proceeded to kill her entire clan, not understanding at the time that what she felt was hatred and a desire for revenge. She then returned to her previous home to give the men she killed a proper burial, and once she was alone, she felt a peace of mind, which she felt happy about. Over 400 years ago, Sekhmet drove Volcanica past the Great Waterfall just so she could rest, following into a fight between the two with Sekhmet falling from the Great Waterfall while fighting, concluding into her death.

Pandora (パンドラ, Pandora)
Voiced by (English): Deneen Melody
Voiced by (Japanese): Rie Kugimiya
Pandora is the Witch of Vanity as well the true main antagonist of the series who has a mysterious relationship with the Witch Cult and appears throughout history as the driving force behind several major events prior to the beginning of the series. The only witch still freely roaming the world after Satella's imprisonment, she acts dignified and graceful, but when Geuse takes the Sloth Genes, she's a maniac and not calm and composed at all. She dodges direct questions, answering with "for the greater good" and "sacrifices are necessary" when she brought the rest of the cult for her amusement. She does what she wants and wraps it nicely. Pandora's very existence is made to be a secret, as talking about her is a taboo for both the moderate and radical members of the Witch Cult. Pandora attacked the Elven village 100 years ago along with Regulus, and was also behind the attack on Garkla 30 years ago and the failed White Whale conquest battle 15 years ago where Theresia died, and has somehow turned both her and Kurgan into puppets for the Witch Cult.
Hector (ヘクトール, Hekutōru)
Voiced by (English): J. Michael Tatum
Voiced by (Japanese): Junichi Suwabe
Hector is the Warlock of Melancholy. Very little is known about him, and he seems to be completely absent from historical records. Hector also seems to hold some significance in the pasts of Roswaal and Echidna, with the Sanctuary apparently being created as a way to hide from him.

== Antagonists ==
=== Witch Cult ===
==== Sin Archbishops ====
Petelgeuse Romanée-Conti (ペテルギウス・ロマネコンティ, Peterugiusu Romanekonti)
Voiced by (English): Todd Haberkorn; Mark Whitten (as Geuse)
Voiced by (Japanese): Yoshitsugu Matsuoka
One of the leaders of the Witch Cult, who represents the sin of Sloth. He was once a respectable man, but was driven insane long ago. In arc 4, he is revealed to have been a close family friend to Emilia and her aunt Fortuna. When the "Witch of Vanity" attacked the Elf settlement a hundred years previously, he absorbed the unstable Witch Factors of Sloth and accidentally killed Fortuna, which became the source of his insanity and devotion to Satella. His true nature is that of a spirit that possessed compatible bodies. Petelgeuse wields the Authority of Sloth, which manifests a supernatural ability known as Unseen Hands, invisible shadow-like tentacles that are also capable of phasing through objects. He's usually accompanied by a particularly special group of ten hand picked cultists called "Fingers" who act as sub-commanders and spare bodies for Petelgeuse, each leading one unit of several cultists. He targets Subaru, sensing his deep connection to the Witch of Envy. He is eventually defeated by Julius and Subaru, and crushed to death underneath carriage wheels by Subaru.
Regulus Corneas (レグルス・コルニアス, Regurusu Koruneasu)
Voiced by (English): Kyle McCarley (Season 1); Khoi Dao (Season 2)
Voiced by (Japanese): Akira Ishida
One of the leaders of the Witch Cult, who represents the sin of Greed. More than 100 years ago, Regulus used to live with his family. His father was an alcoholic but tried to be a good father, his mother complained about bad earnings but apologized for it occasionally, and his two brothers who were sometimes mean to him but gave him their share of their meal if he accidentally spilled his. At some point in the past, Regulus obtained the Witch Factors of Greed, and subsequently killed his entire family, then village and then everyone in the surrounding cities. He broke his childhood love's mind, slaughtered her family and forced her to marry him, thus making her become his first of many wives. Regulus was talkative, and tended to describe himself as "unselfish" despite representing greed. He would often go on and on about plausible theories, though in actuality he forced his own selfishness on others and tried to justify it. If his opponents had said something that went against his opinions and beliefs, he would find unreasonable faults in them, becoming angry while accusing them of "violating his rights". He was extremely prideful and viewed himself as a "divine being" or "the most complete being", which greatly hindered his assessment of people, no matter if they were his enemies or allies, to the point he would make light of the Sword Saint. He often pointed out his dislike for needlessly involving himself with others. Regulus wielded the Authority of Greed, which allowed him to stop the time of objects so that no outside force can interfere with them. Thus, he can attack with any object, even the air itself, turning it into a projectile which cannot be blocked by anything. His Lion Heart ability stops his heart's time, and his Little King ability links his heart to his wives's, removing Lion Heart's time limit, making Regulus completely invincible and immortal. His megalomaniacal and hot-tempered personality often resulted in unneeded fights, however due to his overwhelmingly powerful Authority of Greed, he always came out victorious and unharmed. Due to his long life as a Sin Archbishop without ever getting his life threatened, he grew naive and arrogant; he disclosed his secret to Subaru, who in turn was able to connect all the dots and unravel his formidable Authority, allowing Reinhard to deal the finishing blow. In his final moments, Regulus revealed how he hated being pitied, going even as far as saying he became a Sin Archbishop just so he could protect himself and his kingdom from such people; whoever offended him or his wives would end up getting killed, no matter their acquaintanceship with him. Regulus never realized his "sins", not even in the moments before his demise. His view on the world was corrupt and distorted from the beginning until the end.
Lye Batenkaitos (ライ・バテンカイトス, Rai Batenkaitos)
Voiced by (English): Erik Scott Kimerer
Voiced by (Japanese): Kengo Kawanishi
One of the leaders of the Witch Cult, who represents the Gourmet aspect of the sin of Gluttony. Lye believes that everything comes down to experiences, and the one who manages to get better knowledge is the one who enriches his life and wins over people, also remarking that knowledge is power and memories are bonds, ultimately concluding that this means that he is the greatest. Due to that, he also refers to himself as intellectual Sin Archbishop.
Roy Alphard (ロイ・アルファルド, Roi Arufarudo)
Voiced by (English): Edward Mendoza
Voiced by (Japanese): Kengo Kawanishi
One of the leaders of the Witch Cult, who represents the Bizarre Eating aspect of the sin of Gluttony. He is absorbed by Reid Astrea after eating him in arc 6.
Louise Arneb (ルイ・アルネブ, Rui Arunebu)
Voiced by (Japanese): Konomi Kohara
One of the leaders of the Witch Cult, who represents the Satiation aspect of the sin of Gluttony. Louise resides in the Hall of Memories, a place that functions as a cradle for Od Lagna. She does not have a physical body and experiences life through the Memories and Names her brothers, Lye and Roy, provide for her and through possessing them. She becomes obsessed with Subaru for a variety of reasons including eating his memories and discovering his Return by Death ability and realizing he retains memories of people her brothers have eaten. Wanting to experience and obtain Return by Death for herself, she splits her soul and plants one of the parts in Subaru's soul so she can collect it and the ability later. However, when her split soul awakens again, the terror of dying scars her mentally and she becomes afraid of Subaru. Louise believes that the act of eating Names and Memories she and her brothers commit is a sure-fire way to find and build the perfect life, saying that life is so unfair and that this is the correct way to correct it.
Sirius (シリウス, Shiriusu)
Voiced by (English): Jennifer Sun Bell
Voiced by (Japanese): Chika Anzai
One of the leaders of the Witch Cult, who represents the sin of Wrath. A very eccentric individual who is completely wrapped in bandages. As shown by her position, Sirius can be scary when she becomes angry, though normally she gives off a disgusting aura. She is also Petelgeuse's stalker and is his self proclaimed wife. She has a distinct way of speaking; in an intimate, rational manner, which makes her even more off-putting, and repeatedly apologizes to everyone about nothing or small things. She does not stand people who belittle her relationship with Petelgeuse as seen when she tried to kill Regulus for saying how disgusting she is, clinging to a deceased person. Strangely enough, she harbours hatred towards the Witch of Envy, going as far as promising Subaru (who she thought was Petelgeuse) that she would burn her before him if he ever managed to revive the Witch. Sirius despises any woman that's too close to her beloved Petelgeuse, as seen when she expressed her hatred towards Beatrice for simply standing next to Subaru, asking him what he finds so appealing on her, before threatening to burn her alive. Sirius wields the Authority of Wrath, which forces people's emotions to resonate with each other however she pleases, an ability Subaru refers to as "soulwashing". She can also transmit physical sensations, so if she or anyone else is killed or injured, she forces everyone in an area to die or be injured in the exact same way. She is captured at the end of arc 5 after being defeated by Priscilla and Lilliana.
Capella Emerada Lugnica (カペラ・エメラダ・ルグニカ, Kapera Emerada Rugunica)
Voiced by (English): Brittany Lauda
Voiced by (Japanese): Aoi Yūki
One of the leaders of the Witch Cult, who represents the sin of Lust. Capella is considered to be the worst personality wise within the Sin Archbishops. She speaks in a way that sounds like she spat and trampled upon courtesy, complete with a child like cruelty. She claims that all the love and respect in the world exists to be monopolized by her, changing her and others' appearances so that everyone would come to love her, making her a monster that plays with the dignity and values of people, all the while spitting her brand of ridicule. She is shown to not think highly of her fellow Sin Archbishops, referring to them with degrading nicknames when not using their names. Capella wields the Authority of Lust, which gives her the power to use her Transmutation and Transfiguration ability. This ability not only allows her to transform and alter her own body into anything she desires, but also rapidly heal and regenerate herself from any injury. Capella's ability is not just limited to herself, as she can also manipulate and transform the bodies of other creatures, and she can turn corpses into creatures called Demi-Beasts.
Stride Vollachia (ストライド・ヴォラキア, Sutoraido Vorakia)
One of the leaders of the Witch Cult, who represents the sin of Pride. Stride was born during the Emperor Selection Ceremony as one of the sons of the Emperor. However, he was born sick, and his family sent him to train under Kurgan. He was fully expected to die under Kurgan's harsh training regime, nevertheless Kurgan took care of him and he grew stronger under him. After growing up under Kurgan, they approached the throne as part of the Imperial Selection. It's presumed he won the Selection, and was the rightful next Emperor. However, Stride was poisoned by his father, the former emperor, as Stride was unable to have children which was a duty expected of an Emperor. However, Stride survived the poison. Stride self-proclaims that he has the seen the truth by being on the boundary of life and death, and believes that there is an outside entity called viewers in this world. As the Sin Archbishop of Pride, Stride is vain and prideful, disliking being told what to do by others, as shown when he rebuked Yaktol Suwen for trying to restrict his actions, and later did the same to Kurgan for talking back to him. He is openly rude to those he views to be lower than himself and Theresia noted that he fluently insulted others. Despite this, he is a quick thinker, and praises things he finds to be satisfactory. He was willing to ignore formalities to stop Wilhelm and Kurgan's first duel in order to prevent himself from potentially losing a valuable pawn. He plots against the Kingdom of Lugnica knowing full well the power of Volcanica's protection, earning him his alias. He is later revealed to be the Sin Archbishop of Pride, though he does not have any faith in The Witch of Envy. Stride speaks in a very archaic, regal and scornful manner. He favors using the pronoun "mine venerable" self when speaking, which is a pronoun used only by kings or emperors. He also refers to people using "thou" with it having connotations of Stride treating everyone he speaks to as an inferior.

==== Followers ====
Ketty Muttart (ケティ・ムッタート, Keti Muttaato)
Voiced by: Hiroshi Yanaka
One of the Witch Cult members posing as a merchant. Additionally he's one of Petelgeuse's "Fingers", people that are born with an aptitude of contracting with spirits and have special magic implanted in their bodies to make it easier for Petelgeuse to take them over when his current body is damaged or destroyed. Petelgeuse used him in an unsuccessful attempt to kill Wilhelm by self-destructing with a fire stone that was implanted his body. He's first seen in the town Fleur where he refers Subaru to Otto.

=== Assassin Guild ===
Elsa Granhiert (エルザ・グランヒルテ, Eruza Guranhirute)
Voiced by (English): Cristina Vee
Voiced by (Japanese): Mamiko Noto
A supposedly immortal assassin from a northern country called Gusteko. She is the first person to kill Subaru and trigger his time rewind ability. She is after Emilia's insignia for reasons yet to be explained. She attempts to buy it from Felt and Rom, but ends up killing them instead when negotiations fail during the first and second timelines. Elsa is known for killing her 'prey' by cutting open their stomach, earning her the epithet "Bowel Hunter". She is also able to sense fear in others as she did when she saw Subaru passing by on the way to the loot house. In the final timeline of the stolen insignia, Elsa is defeated by Reinhard and retreats, vowing to come after Subaru again. She reappears in arc 4 along Meili to attack Roswaal's mansion, once again being responsible for several of Subaru's deaths. In the end, she is defeated in battle against Garfiel Tinsel, who inflicts enough damage to negate her regeneration and crush her to death.
Meili Portroute (メィリィ・ポートルート, Meiri Pootoruuto)
Voiced by (English): Erika Harlacher
Voiced by (Japanese): Eri Suzuki
A blue haired girl who lives in Irlam village. In reality, she is an assassin who comes from the same organization as Elsa, who has the power to tame and control mabeasts. She is the mastermind behind the events of the 2nd Arc, and returns in the 4th Arc along with Elsa and is defeated by Garfiel Tinsel and taken as prisoner. In arc 6, Subaru and his friends request her help in crossing the Augria sand dunes. At the tower, Meili is responsible for two of Subaru's deaths, but after Subaru read her book of the dead, he tried to help her, ultimately making her join the Emilia camp.

== Other characters ==
Kadomon Risch (カドモン・リッシュ, Kadomon Risshu)
Voiced by (English): Patrick Seitz
Voiced by (Japanese): Kenta Miyake
A muscular and firmly built fruit seller in the royal capital, often seen holding a twig in his mouth. Subaru considers him a friend, even though Kadomon barely remembers him.
Theresia van Astrea (テレシア・ヴァン・アストレア, Tereshia van Asutorea)
Voiced by (English): Xanthe Huynh
Voiced by (Japanese): Minami Takahashi
Theresia is Wilhelm's late wife, Reinhard's grandmother, and one of the key figures who ended the Demi-human Revolt/War 40 years ago. She was the previous generation's Sword Saint. Theresia was described as an open-minded and sociable person, who had a flaw of shoving aside her own personal feelings only to focus on others. Despite her immense talent and lineage, she never wanted to be a swordsman and take up the mantle of the "Sword Saint". However, certain circumstances forced her to resign to her fate in order to end the civil war and protect the loved ones she had left. This eventually led Wilhelm to "take" the sword from her and free her from a life of bondage by duty. Theresia was an avid flower lover, and could often be found viewing them in ruins where she and Wilhelm routinely met. She went missing while fighting the White Whale 14 years ago and is presumed dead. In arc 5, what appears to be her animated corpse is used by the witch cult in their attack on Priscilla, which in turn is defeated by Reinhard.
Marcos Gildark (マーコス・ギルダーク, Maakosu Girudaaku)
Voiced by (English): Chris Tergliafera
Voiced by (Japanese): Tetsu Inada
The stern and strict Knight Commander of the Royal Guard. Nicknamed "Boulder" for his specialized magic.
Miklotov McMahon (マイクロトフ・マクマホン, Maikurotofu Makumahon)
Voiced by (English): John Snyder
Voiced by (Japanese): Motomu Kiyokawa
One of the Representatives of the Sage Council whom serve as the highest ruling administrative body in the wake of the late royal family. A kindly and wiry old man, he was impressed by Subaru's courage and passion to stand up for Emilia against the harsh discrimination directed towards her during the Royal Selection meeting.
Bordeaux Zellgef (ボルドー・ツェルゲフ, Borudoo Tserugefu)
Voiced by (English): Marc Diraison
Voiced by (Japanese) Jiro Saito
One of the Representatives of the Sage Council, and one of the most outspoken critics against Emilia's inclusion into the Royal Selection. He was one of the war heroes who fought by Wilhelm's side during the Demi-human Revolt/War 40 years ago.
Russell Fellow (ラッセル・フェロー, Rasseru Feroo)
Voiced by (English): Chris Cason
Voiced by (Japanese): Tōru Ōkawa
The Treasurer of Lugnica's Merchant Trade Union. He's a considerably shrewd individual who was initially seen by Subaru helping the Crusch Camp acquire weapons, personnel and munitions in preparation for the second White Whale subjugation. Along with Anastasia, he helps Subaru legitimatize and finalized negotiations with Crusch regarding the trade with magic stones being offered by Roswaal (via Rem as a proxy) in-exchange for sharing in the distribution of the stones in the capital and acquiring Subaru's flip-phone.
Liliana Masquerade (リリアナ・マスカレード, Ririana Masukareedo)
Voiced by (Japanese): Aya Yamane
The Songstress of Pristella and traveling bard and diva. Liliana has a highly eccentric personality, constantly yelling and exclaiming in odd ways and displaying unbridled enthusiasm. She is already acquainted with the members of the Emilia Camp, having played music for them between Arcs 2 and 3. Priscilla takes a liking to Liliana and selects her to aid her in her battle against Sirius. Liliana uses her music and her Divine Protection of Telepathy to override Sirius's authority, allowing Priscilla to defeat the Archbishop.
Halibel (ハリベル, Hariberu)
The Admirer, a shinobi and mercenary from Kararagi. Halibel is a friendly wolf human.
