= List of Saga of Tanya the Evil episodes =

Saga of Tanya the Evil, known in Japan as Yōjo Senki (幼女戦記; lit. 'The Military Chronicles of a Little Girl'), is a Japanese anime television series produced by NUT based on the light novel series The Saga of Tanya the Evil, written by Carlo Zen and illustrated by Shinobu Shinotsuki. The first season of the anime series aired from January 6 to March 31, 2017. Crunchyroll (Note: Formerly known as Funimation) licensed the series in North America and streamed it as it aired. The opening theme song for the season is "Jingo Jungle", performed by Myth & Roid, while the ending theme song is "Los! Los! Los!" ("Go! Go! Go!"), performed by Aoi Yūki, who is Tanya Degurechaff's voice actress.

In June 2021, a second season was announced. The main cast and staff returned to reprise their roles. It aired from July 8 to September 23, 2026. The opening theme song for the season is "Why? Red Induction", performed by Myth & Roid. While the ending theme song "Weiter! Weiter!" ("Further! Further!"), is performed by Aoi Yūki, who is Tanya Degurechaff's voice actress.

== Series overview ==
Season	Episodes	Originally released	
Season	Episodes	First released	Last released
1	12	January 6, 2017	March 31, 2017
2	12	July 8, 2026	September 23, 2026

== Episodes ==
=== Season 1 (2017) ===
No. overall	No. in season	Title	Directed by	Storyboarded by	Original release date
1	1	"The Devil of the Rhine"; Transliteration: "Rain no Akuma" (Japanese: ラインの悪魔)	Yutaka Uemura	Yutaka Uemura & Hiromi Taniguchi	January 6, 2017
At the Rhine, the Imperial Army fights a battle of attrition against the Francois Republic. There, Second Lieutenant Tanya Degurechaff leads the 3rd platoon of the Imperial Army 205th Assault Mage Company in combat against enemy forces, with Corporal Viktoriya Serebryakov as a member of her platoon. When two mages under Tanya's command disobey her orders, she transfers them to the rear. Some time later, while the 205th is en route to reinforce the 403rd Assault Mage Company, the 403rd is wiped out by Republican Army mages. Tanya orders the three other members of her platoon to rendezvous with other members of the 205th and engages the Republican mages herself. Tanya annihilates them after they refuse her demands to stand down. Later, in the Republican capital of Parisee, military leaders discuss Tanya, who is given the moniker of "Devil of the Rhine" by Republican Army troopers for her fearsome combat abilities and performance. At Imperial Strategic Headquarters (located in the Imperial capital of Berun), Lieutenant Colonel Rerugen is concerned that Tanya had been sent to Rhine and calls her 'a monster in the form of a girl'. Meanwhile at the Rhine, Viktoriya learns that the insubordinate mages that Tanya had previously sent to the rear are dead after enemy forces shelled the pillbox where they had been stationed, something Tanya had anticipated and planned for.
2	2	"Prologue"; Transliteration: "Purorōgu" (Japanese: プロローグ)	Yasuhiro Akamatsu	Yutaka Uemura & Hiromi Taniguchi	January 13, 2017
In modern-day Tokyo in 2013, an underperforming salaryman is fired by his supervisor, who then pushes said supervisor in front of a moving train. As the supervisor falls onto the tracks, time stops and he hears the words of a self-proclaimed God coming from the people at the station, demanding the supervisor acknowledge him as God. The supervisor asserts his opinion that the being is not God and names it 'Being X'. Being X comes to the conclusion that the salaryman lacks faith in Him because he does not live in circumstances that would require him to have faith, and decides to reincarnate the unrepentant supervisor in an alternate 1913-era Europe, where he would potentially face enough troubles that he would have no choice but to have faith in Being X. Tanya grows up in a poorly funded orphanage in Berun, where it is discovered by routine tests that she has an exceedingly high magical aptitude. Tanya decides to enlist in the Imperial Army, where she believes that she would fare better than as an orphan in wartime. She performs well and is entrusted with training new cadets at a military academy, but is ruthless and unforgiving to her students, much to Rerugen's horror. In 1923, a 9-year-old Tanya is operating as an artillery observer at the Northern Theater Force Garrison during the initial invasion of the Empire by the Entente. Lieutenant Colonel Anson Sioux of the Entente leads a company of the 5th Aerial Mage Battalion after Tanya who is ordered to stay and delay them, which Tanya does so at great injury to herself. Later, back at Garrison Headquarters, Tanya is awarded the Silver Wings Assault Badge and hopes she isn’t sent to the frontlines. Instead, she is dressed up and lauded as a hero of the Empire.
3	3	"Deus Vult"; Transliteration: "Kami ga Sore o Nozomareru" (Japanese: 神がそれを望まれる)	Kana Shundo	Kana Shundo	January 20, 2017
After recovering from her injuries, Tanya is assigned to the Tactical Instructor Squad away from the front, to her great relief. She tests a new type of computation jewel (a device necessary for mages to perform magic), the Elenium Type-95, but this proves to be as dangerous as fighting on the frontlines due to the extreme instability of the Type-95. Chief Development Engineer Adelheid von Schugel pushes her to her limits, but is unable to make the Type-95 sufficiently stable. After criticizing the technology, she requests a transfer which is approved, and the project is frozen. That night, Being X animates a nutcracker doll and accuses Tanya of not having developed any faith or insight, but Tanya disagrees with Being X and destroys the toy. She wakes up the next day and assumes it was a dream, but sees a paper with Deus lo vult (God wills it) written on her bedside. Tanya participates in one more experiment and just as the Type-95 is about to explode, Being X performs a miracle and stabilizes the jewel to prove His power to Tanya. As a result, the Type-95 is now usable only to Tanya, and greatly amplifies her power when used, on the condition that she prays to Being X. She views this as a curse. The next year, Tanya is again sent to the front, eventually leading to the events of Episode 1. Headquarters decides to send her to officer training and she recommends Viktoriya for officer training as well. They both prepare to return to Berun for officer training. Meanwhile, Headquarters realises the necessity of a rapid response unit in the Imperial Army.
4	4	"Campus Life"; Transliteration: "Kyanpasu Raifu" (Japanese: キャンパス・ライフ)	Yūsuke Maruyama	Yasuhiro Akamatsu, Kana Shundo, Hiromi Taniguchi & Yutaka Uemura	January 27, 2017
Six months after leaving the frontlines, Tanya is still training to be an officer at a military academy and is doing well at her studies. She meets General Zettour in the academy's library and he asks for her opinion on the war. She predicts that it will become a world war and outlines a strategy for the Empire, using the firepower and agility of mages to minimise military losses. He is impressed by her battle knowledge and ideas and asks for a report, which she sees as an opportunity for career advancement. Later, Tanya meets Captain Uger, one of her academy rivals, in a café. Uger reveals to Tanya that he is more concerned about his family than the war and of the future impact the war will have on his daughter, who he fears may one day be forced to fight. Tanya is able to emotionally manipulate him to drop out of academy in exchange for a safer line of work, securing her position as one of the elite students at the academy. Zettour passes Tanya's plan to General Kurt von Rudersdorf. At a conference held at the Imperial Strategic Headquarters, Zettour tables Tanya's plan for a rapid-response mage battalion, which is accepted. At the Western Theater Garrison, Rerugen is furious when he learns that Tanya's plan has been implemented with her in command of the rapid reaction force. Tanya is invited to dinner with the Colonel, where she is put in charge of a new 48-strong rapid-response mage battalion and will be promoted to the rank of Captain. Much to her horror, this will actually be more dangerous than fighting on the front lines. She tries to find ways to delay the implementation of the battalion, especially after a large number of applications for the battalion are received, but a newly-promoted Viktoriya is assigned to assist her, thus preventing Tanya from further delaying the formation of the battalion.
5	5	"My First Battalion"; Transliteration: "Hajimari no Daitai" (Japanese: はじまりの大隊)	Yūta Takamura	Shinji Satō	February 3, 2017
Tanya holds a test to decide whether or not the mages who have sent in the applications are worthy of joining the new battalion, but most fail, resulting in a low recruitment rate, leading to her superiors complaining that her standards are set too high. Tanya accepts this compromise to accept more lower-standard mages, and declares that she will bring all the mages to an acceptable standard in just a month. She is granted free rein on how to go about it. She holds a gruelling training regime, with many nearly dying (which she hopes would deter them from further training), but the mages are instead frightened that dropping out will incur even worse punishment and decide to continue. Some are even inspired to meet her lofty standards. Within a month, they have been successfully transformed into skilled soldiers, even by Tanya's standards. She then receives instructions to go with her battalion (named the 203rd Aerial Mage Battalion, or Pixie Battalion) to the Grand Duchy of Dakia which has mobilised its troops and crossed Imperial borders. There, the first battle the 203rd encounters is totally in their favour. The Dakians have no mages and still use techniques for out-dated forms of warfare, even lacking the capability for the most basic of anti-aircraft operations. The Dakian attack is repulsed with ease by the elite 203rd, resulting in massive Dakian casualties. Tanya commands the 203rd to follow her to the Dakian capital to test their combat prowess, leaving the remainder of the Dakian invasion force to regular Imperial forces. There, they locate the Republic-backed Carbelius Arms Factory that is undefended from aerial attack. Tanya orders the 203rd to attack it; but in accordance with international law, they can only destroy the factory if they have declared their intentions in advance, allowing for armed retaliation. This would give away the 203rd's surprise advantage. However, Tanya uses a child-like voice to broadcast her intentions to destroy the factory over a radio, which is dismissed by factory workers as a harmless child's prank, allowing the 203rd to completely destroy the factory. The 203rd, satisfied with their overwhelming success, returns to base.
6	6	"Beginning of Madness"; Transliteration: "Kyōki no Makuake" (Japanese: 狂気の幕開け)	Yasuhiro Akamatsu	Yuuji Kumazawa	February 10, 2017
Headquarters concludes that Imperial troops should be able to completely occupy Dakia by winter and turns their attention to the fact that the Empire is still fighting on two fronts: against the Entente and the Republic. They decide to focus their efforts on destroying the Entente first, but are worried that there will not be sufficient supplies to do so with there only being enough to last the Imperial Army through winter. Finally, an order is sent for the 203rd to transfer to Norden against the Entente. Later, Tanya and Viktoriya discuss the possibility of the Entente being allied to the Republic and/or the Allied Kingdom (analogous to the United Kingdom), which is later shown to be true. Tanya realises that Being X may be orchestrating the upcoming world war in order to force a situation wherein she would have no choice but to worship Him. At Norden, Viper Battalion fights against attacking Entente forces but faces heavy losses. The 203rd comes in just in time to rescue Viper Battalion and to launch a counterattack. When offered to be reinforced by additional Imperial Army units, Tanya turns down the offer to create a reputation for the 203rd. She chooses to go after enemy bombers, leaving the rest of the 203rd to carry out the attack. After downing a flight of bombers and landing to look for survivors, Being X once again stops time and animates a dead Entente soldier, and asks Tanya how it feels to fight a war against the whole world. Tanya shoots Being X's avatar down and later eradicates a hidden Allied Kingdom observation post that was gathering data on her. At Parisee, Lieutenant Colonel Zevran Biantot informs General Pierre Michelaud Lugo of the failure of the Entente's attacks and of Republican mage casualties, advising him to refrain from sending more Republican mages to assist the Entente. However, Lugo refuses, seemingly under the influence of Being X. In the Entente Ministry of Defence, it is revealed that Anson Sioux has been promoted to Colonel, but is worried about dying and leaving his wife and daughter (Mary Sioux) behind.
6.5	6.5	"War Report"; Transliteration: "Senkyō Hōkoku" (Japanese: 戦況報告)	N/A	N/A	February 17, 2017
A recap of previous episodes from Tanya's point of view.
7	7	"The Battle of the Fjord"; Transliteration: "Fiyorudo no Kōbō" (Japanese: フィヨルドの攻防)	Kana Shundo	Kana Shundo	February 24, 2017
At Port Arnelus, Colonel Sioux bids farewell to his family as he leaves for his post at the relatively quiet Orse Fjord, located far from the front. Some time later, he discovers that he had received a rifle from his daughter as an early Christmas present. Meanwhile at the Imperial Army Northern Theater Command's Strategy Conference, Tanya proposes a strategic retreat, thus shortening supply lines for retreating Imperial forces, allowing the Imperial Army to resupply and making it easier for them to launch an offensive in spring. She asserts that while the retreat would continue the war, an offensive at the moment would exhaust the Imperial army in Norden, thus limiting its effectiveness. Despite this, it is decided that an offensive would be carried out regardless of the potential losses. Afterwards, during a conversation with Rerugen and Rudersdorf, she deduces that the offensive's main purpose is to be a diversion for Imperial forces to launch an amphibious offensive at the rear of the enemy. Rudersdorf decides to send the 203rd to launch a surprise attack at the heavily defended Orse Fjord in advance of their North Sea Fleet. During the attack, the 203rd is intercepted by a battalion-sized unit of mages led by Colonel Sioux. Tanya leads the 1st Company in intercepting enemy mages while the 2nd and 3rd Companies destroy the defensive cannons located along the coast, allowing the fleet to land and take control of the railroads, in turn allowing for Imperial forces to take over the port. Sioux’s mages are devastated by the 1st Company. In a final confrontation, Tanya bayonets Sioux, who falls into the sea. Tanya recovers Sioux's rifle and claims it as her own. Post-credits scene: Mary Sioux and her mother in Arkansas hear over the radio that the Orse Fjord's defenders were wiped out, causing Mary to cry.
8	8	"Trial by Fire"; Transliteration: "Hi no Shiren" (Japanese: 火の試練)	Migmi	Hiroshi Kobayashi	March 3, 2017
Bientot and the Republican Army's 2nd Mage Company support a rebel uprising in Arene City against Imperial occupiers, located in former Republican territory in the Western Theater. This is a problem because the Arene rebels now control the large railroad that passes through Arene, which is straining Imperial supply lines. The 203rd are ordered to intercept and destroy all resistance even if it means civilian casualties. They find the city heavily defended. However, Strategic Command has a plan to rapidly suppress the Arene rebellion; as in accordance to international law, should a city not be evacuated after an evacuation order, all remaining people in a city will be treated as enemy soldiers. After a fierce attack by the 203rd, battered Republican mages seek shelter in a building. Following a refusal to surrender or evacuate, the 203rd observes the murder of a captured Imperial soldier by Arene rebels, providing a casus belli for retaliation. Arene comes under sustained attack from Imperial artillery, causing countless civilian deaths; the Republican mages are driven off completely and control of Arene is returned to the Empire. Second Lieutenant Vooren Grantz refuses to open fire at the Arene rebels but Tanya pressures him into doing so. At Strategic Headquarters, Zettour reveals to Rerugen that the idea for the destruction of Arene actually came from a thesis written by Tanya that details methods to circumvent international laws on city bombardment. At an Allied Kingdom hospital, the critically wounded Colonel Sioux slowly recovers from his encounter with Tanya and says that God told him to destroy the Devil.
9	9	"Preparations for Advance"; Transliteration: "Zenshin Junbi" (Japanese: 前進準備)	Yūsuke Maruyama	Yūsuke Maruyama, Hiromi Taniguchi & Yutaka Uemura	March 10, 2017
Some days after the battle at Arene, Tanya meets Major Uger from the academy, who tells her of a plan to withdraw Imperial forces on the Rhine to draw Republican forces into a trap: "Operation Revolving Door", consisting of four separate phases. Zettour proposes this plan at the Command Strategy Conference and arranges to use the 203rd to attack the rear of Republican forces. The Empire carries out a widespread disinformation campaign as the first phase "Operation Fog and Sun" to trick Republican forces of a large-scale Imperial retreat. Rerugen tells Tanya that the plan for the second phase "Operation Shock and Awe" is to take out Republican command headquarters and their communication systems. Schugel announces that a new high-speed rocket weapon, the V-1, will transport the 203rd to the three potential locations of the enemy headquarters. Meanwhile at the Rhine, Imperial troops retreat from the front, resulting in the confident advance of Republican forces. Unbeknownst to them, the Imperial Army left booby traps while retreating.
10	10	"Path to Victory"; Transliteration: "Shōri e no Michi" (Japanese: 勝利への道)	Yūsuke Onoda	Yutaka Uemura & Hiromi Taniguchi	March 17, 2017
Sioux is shown to have survived, and seen to be travelling on an Allied Kingdom ship and plotting his revenge on Tanya. Following the success of "Operation Shock and Awe", the 203rd proceeds to retreat via submarine. At the Imperial High Council, various military leaders undergo a grilling by government officials on their strategy of withdrawal, accused of exposing Imperial manufacturing facilities to potential Republican attack. They delay their response, stalling for time while they wait for Tanya’s unit to report on their status. Finally, Zettour announces to the Imperial High Council that the enemy command structure has been destroyed and the commencement of the third phase of "Operation Lock Pick". It starts with the detonation of the traps left behind by the retreating Imperial Army, resulting in widespread Republican losses. Without communications, the Republican forces are in disarray and suffer a sustained counterattack by Imperial heavy armour and mechanised infantry who completely encircle Republican forces. During an investigation on the cause of the communications breakdown, Bientot arrives at the ruins of the Republican Army’s headquarters and is horrified. The 203rd takes part in the fourth phase of "Operation Revolving Door", a series of mop-up operations against Republican Army remnants but suddenly come under attack from an Allied Kingdom mage unit with long-range weapons led by Sioux.
11	11	"Resistance"; Transliteration: "Teikō-sha" (Japanese: 抵抗者)	Yuzuru Tachikawa	Yuzuru Tachikawa	March 24, 2017
The diminished 203rd goes on the offensive rather than retreat. They use their altitude advantage but suffer heavy losses, especially when Sioux uses a magically-enhanced trench gun. Sioux pursues Tanya and when they come face-to-face, she bayonets him. She then recognises him from their previous encounter, but he is possessed by Being X and grabs her. Viktoriya helps Tanya break free and Tanya empties an entire magazine into Sioux, penetrating his magical defenses. Riddled with bullets, he detonates an explosive, but Tanya and Viktoriya resist the blast just as a battalion of Imperial reinforcements arrive and chase off the Allied Kingdom mages. It is shown that while injured, most of the 203rd has survived. After the severe losses suffered by Republican forces because of the Operation Revolving Door, the Republican Army abandon Parisee, resulting in Imperial forces moving in and occupying the city. Imperial High Council congratulates the military on their success, and discuss the acquisition of the Republic's colonies. While the men of the 203rd celebrate on a Republican beach, Tanya and Viktoriya discuss the ending of the war, and Tanya suspects the Republic is planning to evacuate by sea to prepare a counter-offensive. She requests permission to attack the Republican military port of Brest, but it is refused and she is also prevented from undertaking her own "reconnaissance". She bemoans this opportunity to end the war.
12	12	"How to Use a Victory"; Transliteration: "Shōri no Tsukaikata" (Japanese: 勝利の使い方)	Kana Shundo & Yutaka Uemura	Kana Shundo, Yutaka Uemura & Hiromi Taniguchi	March 31, 2017
While the Empire celebrates the truce (that could finally lead to an armistice and so to the end of the war), Tanya explains to Rerugen of her being aware of the fact that it is only a matter of time for the war to restart, since the Republic and all other nations will never allow the Empire to become the most powerful country in Europe; but more so that refusing to admit defeat and choosing to keep fighting no matter the consequences is simply part of human nature. In fact, the Empire's overwhelming growth finally pushes the remaining superpowers of the World (the Allied Kingdom, the Russy Federation and the Unified States) to form an alliance against the Empire. When General Lugo of the Republican Army proclaims the birth of the Free Republic from Tunis, it becomes clear to the Empire's citizens and soldiers that the war is far from over. While the battles begin once again, Tanya and her squad are sent to Africa to begin the fight against the Free Republic. While haranguing her men, Tanya tells them that the war is proof that God has failed, and that the power to influence mankind is now in the hands of Man and, especially, of the soldiers, once again launching her challenge against Being X. Meanwhile, in the Unified States, Mary Sioux (blessed with Being X's power) enlists in the U.S. Army, seeking vengeance for her father's death.
12.5	SP	"Operation Desert Pasta"; Transliteration: "Sabaku no Pasuta Dai Sakusen" (Japanese: 砂漠のパスタ大作戦)	Yutaka Uemura	Yutaka Uemura & Hiromi Taniguchi	June 19, 2021
Tanya and the 203rd Air Mage Battalion are sent to fight the Free Republic and its foreign allies in the southern desert. Food is scarce, but Colonel Rerugen sends a shipment of dried pasta to the battlefield for the troops. However, given the harsh conditions and shortage of water, the pasta cannot be cooked. Following a raid, the 203rd manages to acquire a substantial quantity of water but the boiled pasta is virtually tasteless. Tanya gains approval from headquarters for the 203rd to embark on a series of "force recon" raids under the name of "Operation Desert Pasta" on the outposts of the Free Republic and its foreign allies. She omits the detail that they also plan to gather ingredients for a pasta sauce. The operation is highly successful and the 203rd enjoy the benefits of eating pasta with a delicious sauce, accompanied by quality wine. Note: This television special takes place after the first season and before the events of Saga of Tanya the Evil: The Movie.

=== Season 2 (2026) ===
No. overall	No. in season	Title	Directed by (Note: Production staff information is taken from the ending credits of each episode.)	Storyboarded by	Original release date
13	1	"Salamander Combat Team"; Transliteration: "Saramandā Sentō-dan" (Japanese: サラマンダー戦闘団)	Takayuki Yamamoto	Takayuki Yamamoto & Shinichi Kurita	July 8, 2026
Tanya addresses her newly formed combined arms unit, Salamander, before they head out to the eastern front against the Federation. There they face stiff resistance and heavy attrition, while Loria proposes freeing the previously purged mages from the internment camps to use against the Empire. Dismayed that her new forces are utterly incompetent, Tanya is forced into more hands-on work than she would like. After repelling a Federation offensive, she grills her new officers for their operational errors, then has the unit maintain a base to hold the line. Later that night, two Federation convoys approach under heavy snowfall. Using Weiss for aerial spotting, Tanya's artillery team demolishes the enemy forces, leaving only silence. Worried at first by the lack of visibility and the eerie quiet, she orders everyone to stay vigilant. She soon realizes there was no need to worry as the artillery strike was devastatingly effective, and the enemy proved even more incompetent than her own unit. After the battle, Tanya uses her child-like voice to praise the artillery team while giving the other officers less harsh feedback, hoping to leave them with a positive impression of her kindness. It backfires, leaving the officers even more terrified of her, though motivated. Note: The second season takes place after the events of Saga of Tanya the Evil: The Movie.
14	2	"A Strange Friendship"; Transliteration: "Kimyōna Yūjō" (Japanese: 奇妙な友情)	Koyo Ogata	Koyo Ogata & Hiromatsu Shū	July 15, 2026
Zettour and Rudersdorf share drinks at a bar, where Rudersdorf reminisces about the past while showing Zettour a rare music record he discovered. Meanwhile, the Allied Kingdom commits the Multinational Volunteer Force to support the Federation, with Loria contributing personnel of its own. On the eastern front, Tanya's unit struggles to maintain its supply lines as partisans repeatedly sabotage their logistics. Realizing that their interrogations have produced only vague and useless information, Tanya uses Visha's fluency in the Federation's primary language to conduct another interrogation. She discovers that the partisans have little interest in communism and are instead motivated by ethnic nationalism and loyalty to their homeland. Recognizing their mistake, Tanya returns to high command and informs Zettour that the Empire is not fighting communists, but ethnonationalists. Zettour and Tanya then devise a plan to exploit ethnic divisions within the Federation by turning minority regions against its communist government. Zettour delivers a persuasive speech to representatives of territories conquered by the Empire, promising friendship and local self-government if they cooperate against the Federation. Tanya is stunned by Zettour's ability to manipulate them and concludes that he must have a place reserved in hell. The strategy succeeds: partisan attacks cease, supply lines stabilize, Tanya can finally enjoy her coffee, and Visha receives new socks. Meanwhile, in Moskva, Loria is horrified that the Empire, the world's common enemy, has begun making allies.
15	3	"Well-Intentioned Mediator"; Transliteration: "Zen'i no Chūkai Hito" (Japanese: 善意の仲介人)	Satoshi Matsubara	Satoshi Matsubara	July 22, 2026
Morale is up at the Eastern front with the new supplies, although military force is stretched thin as the Empire is required to support the new break-off states created. The Kingdom of Ildoa decides to stage a training exercise to pressure the Empire into allowing it to be the peace mediator for the war. Colonel Rerugen meets Virginio Calandro while acting as an observer for the training exercise in Ildoa. Virginio asks to observe the Eastern front and brings up allowing Ildoa to become a peace mediator for the war. Later, Rerugen arrives at the Eastern front and takes over the Salamander combined arms group. Virginio observes the war and is horrified to see that Tanya is ordering artillery to attack civilian targets with thin legal justifications. Further, when he asks Tanya what it would take for the Empire to give up the war, she simply presents herself as a fiercely loyal soldier who only acts on logic and patriotic loyalty. Misled by Tanya's attitude and the discipline of her very well-trained combined arms group, Virginio assumes everyone in the Empire is similar. He reports back to HQ, and Ildoa sends a message to the Empire proposing a treaty with no reparations and a restoration of prewar borders. The Empire's leadership, actually being highly emotional about the large sacrifices already made, rudely rejects the offer from Ildoa and announces preparations for Operation Iron Hammer.
16	4	"Operation Iron Hammer"; Transliteration: "Tettsui Sakusen" (Japanese: 鉄槌作戦)	Tomoaki Takatsudo	Kai Fujisawa	July 29, 2026
Rudersdorf walks through an empty Berun street and visits a grave. He later arrives at work and talks to Zettour about the direction of the war. Both of them hope this final counterattack ends the war. Tanya receives instructions to protect paratroopers who have taken important bridges from the Federation. She relays the mission to her officers, explaining that they are to hit the enemies from behind like an iron hammer and connect to their paratroopers. While the officers are apprehensive about the plan, Tanya tells them she has a secret trick. The combined arms group has the mages ride on tanks to avoid emitting any magic signatures, so the Federation is unaware mages are arriving. The mage battalion in the Salamander unit finds the enemy HQ and destroys it, leading to a success for Operation Iron Hammer. Despite the positive results of the last-ditch effort, the politicians in the Empire are not satisfied and are unwilling to accept a ceasefire. They pressure Rudersdorf to keep moving forward until all of the Empire's enemies are soundly defeated. Zettour clenches his fist, knowing the Empire is doomed on its current path.
17	5	"Unlucky Draw"; Transliteration: "Binbōkuji" (Japanese: 貧乏籤)	Kei Miura	Takayuki Yamamoto	August 5, 2026
Zettour is transferred to the Eastern front after disagreeing with the politicians in Berun. Tanya meets him at Eastern command and is dismayed that there will be no ceasefire. The two discuss Operation Andromeda, a new offensive operation to seize territories rich in resources from the Federation. Zettour proposes that Tanya's combined arms unit be used as a decoy to draw out Federation forces for a reserve unit to destroy. Tanya is terrified and tries to avoid the assignment, but she fails and is forced to accept it. The Federation receives aid from the Unified States, and Operation Andromeda grows more precarious for the Empire. At the headquarters in Berun, Rudersdorf learns that Allied Kingdom bombers have significantly damaged the Empire's industrial capacity. Meanwhile, at the Federation's headquarters, Loria learns that Tanya is within reach and deploys a large number of forces to capture her. The Federation troops swarm the defenses, while the mages from the Multinational Volunteer Force arrive to assist. Weiss is hit by a mage blade and is incapacitated.
18	6	"Decoy"; Transliteration: "Otori" (Japanese: 囮)	Kazuomi Koga	Yūsuke Kubo	August 12, 2026
Major Weiss is woken up by a rescuer. Mary Sioux and Mikael argue about hunting down members of Tanya's unit. At a field clinic, Tanya is informed by Weiss that it was a Federation mage who took him down. Zettour is blocked from assisting Tanya's encircled unit by cautious staff officers, so he instead enlists Grantz and heads to the front himself. The relief unit breaks through the Federation's lines. At Federation HQ, the commanding officers identify Zettour as exposed and redirect their forces toward him. Using himself as a decoy, Zettour tricks the Federation forces into overcommitting, opening the possibility for Tanya to hit their forces from the rear. Reading Zettour's intent, Tanya and her mage unit attempt to withdraw undetected, though the allied mages figure out that Tanya has left. Mary immediately gives chase but runs into Visha, who is acting as a decoy. The Federation mages locate Tanya, and her unit holds them off in a close engagement. While fighting, Tanya sees Grantz at ground level and connects with him. They coordinate a strike from behind to take down the Federation mages. Zettour is severely wounded while left unguarded but survives the encounter and fights back to back with Tanya on the ground.
19	7	"Purgatory"; Transliteration: "Rengoku" (Japanese: 煉獄)	Shunpei Umemoto	Shunpei Umemoto	August 19, 2026
Away from the front lines, Zettour has tea with Tanya, and they discuss the Empire's future following the failure of Project Andromeda. Zettour explains that the Empire has become drunk on victory and suggests that the only way to end the war may be to upend its leadership. Tanya gives a noncommittal response, unwilling to betray her nation. After returning to the capital, Rerugen meets Tanya and implies that she may need to conduct an air raid on their own capital to shock the politicians into action. At Strategic HQ, Rudersdorf argues that the high command is delusional, pursuing victory without any clear objective while leaving the military trapped in endless attrition. Later, Tanya meets Ugar at a cafe, where he suggests attending a funeral to understand the Empire's current atmosphere. At the funeral, Being X appears and visually demonstrates how far the Empire has declined, with its citizens' sense of normality completely distorted. Tanya initially rationalizes their calm demeanor as a positive sign, but Rudersdorf rebukes her, explaining that they are simply so exhausted that they no longer have the energy to scream. Walking alone through the city afterward, Tanya realizes that even if the war ends, no peaceful or happy life awaits her. She curses Being X for her situation.
20	8	"Torpedo Strike"; Transliteration: "Raigeki" (Japanese: 雷撃)	Madoka Yaguchi	Nagisa Miyazaki	August 26, 2026
Tanya lies in bed pondering her experience with the funeral in Berun. Visha knocks on the door and tells Tanya that high command is calling her. With the ongoing attrition on three fronts, high command makes the decision to pull out of the southern front. The withdrawal is initially centered around moving through the Kingdom of Ildoa, but the Kingdom decides to refuse the Empire entry to avoid political risk. Due to this, the Empire is forced to take a sea route controlled by the Allied Kingdom, which enjoys significant naval supremacy. Tanya and the 203rd Aerial Battalion are tasked with attacking the Allied Kingdom's fleet using custom torpedoes developed by Professor von Shugel that are piloted by people. The 203rd executes the plan successfully, destroying several ships, including an aircraft carrier. Afterwards, they are informed by HQ that they are allowed to rest in Ildoa for twenty-four hours for the purpose of symbolically humiliating their noncommittal ally.
21	9	"Sightseeing Tour"; Transliteration: "Kankō Ryokō" (Japanese: 観光旅行)	Kei Miura	Takayuki Yamamoto & Kei Miura	September 2, 2026
Triumphantly landing at a port in Ildoa, Tanya and her mage unit participate in a sightseeing tour. Traveling by train, they admire Ildoa's scenery and architecture, while Tanya grows uneasy at how comfortable and detached from the war the country seems. Thanks to excellent logistics and its avoidance of conflict, Ildoa's citizens enjoy rich meals and a relaxed lifestyle. During the train ride, Calandro meets Tanya for lunch, where she is impressed by a seafood dish. After arriving in the capital, Calandro provides Tanya with a stipend for her unit to spend during their tour. She also learns that Ildoa is supporting the Empire by supplying its surplus fuel. Eventually, the mage unit departs Ildoa, leaving Tanya melancholic over how wonderful life in a nation at peace can be. Upon returning, von Rerugen informs Tanya that two Salamander officers, Molbert and Tospan, were arrested and later released for disobeying absurd orders during an enemy raid, demonstrating the growing chaos within Imperial leadership. General Romel also complains that high command is living in a fantasy world, unaware that the Empire is clearly losing the war. Finally, von Rudersdorf reveals that the Empire is considering attacking Ildoa to stabilize the southern front and secure vital resources. Recognizing the absurdity of the situation, Tanya and Rudersdorf agree that it is time to end the war once and for all.
22	10	"A Way to Survive"; Transliteration: "Katsuro" (Japanese: 活路)	Satoshi Matsubara	Satoshi Matsubara	September 9, 2026
High Command after careful analysis, deems a successful invasion of Ildoa unfeasible; given the Empire's current situation, the best outcome would be conquering the nation's northern region. At the same time, Rudersdorf and Rerugen realize that Ildoa is not a reliable enough ally to justify leaving the Empire's southern border undefended, so they decide to secretly push for peace talks. Rerugen, accompanied by Tanya, meets with Councilor Konrad of the Foreign Ministry. When asked for her assessment, Tanya bluntly admits that the war is lost and that the only remaining option is to secure good enough terms to avoid their exit being a total defeat that could trigger the collapse of the Empire. The diplomat therefore proposes negotiating covertly with the Allies via Ildoa, this time keeping extremist factions and the general public in the dark until the deal is finalized. After considerable effort, Rudersdorf and Rerugen manage to secure the army's backing to accept the original peace terms and Rerugen immediately travels to Ildoa to deliver the peace proposal. Unfortunately, this time it is the Allies who reject peace talks; in a conversation with Rerugen, Calandro makes it clear that, having realized the Empire's strength, the Allies will not stop until they have annihilated it. The war is therefore destined to continue.
23	11	"Hourglass"; Transliteration: "Sunadokei" (Japanese: 砂時計)	Koyo Ogata	Koyo Ogata	September 16, 2026
Rudersdorf's wife and daughter in law return to the capital after the government orders the evacuation of towns and villages along the southern border. Meanwhile, the Empire's situation has become increasingly desperate. High Command has been reduced to conscripting the very young and those previously deemed unfit for service. Allied air raids on the capital have become a daily occurrence. On the Eastern Front, Zettour is promoted to General despite his recent demotion. After he writes to Rudersdorf dismissing the plan to invade Ildoa, Rudersdorf rushes to meet him in person. Following a heated argument, particularly when Rudersdorf floats the idea of a military coup to remove politicians from the chain of command, Zettour seemingly promises to support his friend's plan for total war. In reality, immediately after the meeting, Zettour summons Tanya and orders her to assassinate Rudersdorf, deeming him too stubborn to lead the Empire during such a critical time. Tanya agrees only on the condition that this will be the first step of their own coup to purge fanatics from both the military and the political establishment, thereby laying the groundwork for a peace agreement. She proposes shooting down his plane and passing it off as an accident. However, the Albion government, tipped off by its own intelligence, is simultaneously plotting its own attack on Rudersdorf's aircraft.
24	12	"Exit"; Transliteration: "Deguchi" (Japanese: 出口)	Takayuki Yamamoto	Takayuki Yamamoto	September 23, 2026
Tanya and her mage squadron escort the plane carrying Rudersdorf. Only the most trusted members of the squadron are aware of the plan to crash the plane. Meanwhile, the capital of the Empire is under an air raid, which is acting as a decoy for the Allied mage coalition. The Federation mages head out to escort the Allied mages, who plan on using the bombing as a cover to assassinate Rudersdorf. On the plane, Rudersdorf has a premonition of his upcoming assassination. Right before Tanya is set to detonate the explosives on the plane, the Allied mages run into her team. Mary and Mikael engage in fierce combat against Tanya, nearly killing her multiple times. Mary is defeated after Tanya climbs to an extremely high altitude, forcing Mary to pass out during the chase. Mikael is later tricked by Tanya into impaling her with his bayonet. Tanya prays and uses her Type-95 at maximum output to ram him into an Albion bomber. After dispatching Mikael, Tanya runs into a bloodthirsty Mary, whom she baits into firing a maximum-power energy beam directly at the plane carrying Rudersdorf. Tanya defends it as best she can, but the beam kills Rudersdorf, indirectly achieving Tanya and Zettour's goal. Rudersdorf dies happily, believing that Zettour and Tanya never betrayed him and that he was killed in action. Zettour later arrives in the capital to be placed in charge of the entire military. Tanya is confident the war is finally over, but to her dismay, Zettour immediately moves to invade Ildoa.
