= List of Cautious Hero episodes =

Cautious Hero: The Hero Is Overpowered but Overly Cautious is an anime television series adapted from the light novel series of the same title written by Light Tuchihi and illustrated by Saori Toyota.

Announced on November 7, 2018, the series was produced by White Fox. It was directed by Masayuki Sakoi, with Kenta Ihara handling series composition, Mai Toda designing the characters, and Yoshiaki Fujisawa composing the music. It aired from October 2 to December 27, 2019, on AT-X and other channels. Myth & Roid performed the series' opening theme song "TIT FOR TAT", while Riko Azuna performed the series' ending theme song "be perfect, plz!".

Funimation licensed the series for a SimulDub. Following Sony's acquisition of Crunchyroll, the series was moved to Crunchyroll.

The third episode, which was supposed to air on October 16, 2019, was delayed by a week due to production issues, with a re-broadcast of Episode 2 taking its place. Similarly, Episode 10 was delayed for a week due to production issues, with a recap episode taking its place.

== Episodes ==
No.	Title (Note: All English titles are taken from Funimation.)	Original release date
1	"This Hero Is Too Cautious"; Transliteration: "Kono Yūsha ga Gōman Sugiru" (Japanese: この勇者が傲慢すぎる)	October 2, 2019
Ristarte, a novice Goddess of Healing, is tasked with summoning a hero to save the world of Gaeabrande from a Demon Lord. She picks Seiya Ryuuguuin, a Japanese hero who has unusually high stats. She immediately summons him and while he appears to be ideal for the situation, she soon realizes that she forgot to check to see what Seiya's personality was before picking him, which states that he is "impossibly cautious". After seeking advice from fellow goddess Ariadoa, Ristarte decides to leave Seiya alone to train. A week later, he manages to reach level 15 doing only basic exercises. When they finally travel to Gaeabrande, Seiya tries to buy multiple sets of armor and other items. Outside of town, the first monster they encounter is a basic slime, which Seiya defeats, though he goes overboard, burning the entire area with explosions just in case any fragments are still alive. Just then, they are approached by Chaos Machina, a level 66 demon who is one of the Four Heavenly Kings. She reveals that she was sent out to scout the area in order to kill Seiya before he can pose a threat.
2	"Too Much For a Novice Goddess to Bear"; Transliteration: "Shinmai Megami ni wa Ni ga Omo Sugiru" (Japanese: 新米女神には荷が重すぎる)	October 9, 2019
When Ristarte and Seiya flee to the Divine Realm, Chaos Machina decides to attack Edona. Seiya learns time moves differently in the Divine Realm. Two days later, Ristarte receives a message from Chaos Machina demanding that they return or she will execute one resident every ten minutes. Seiya is unconcerned as ten minutes on Gaeabrande is roughly sixteen hours in the Divine Realm. When he is finally ready, Ristarte is shocked to learn he has reached level 21. They return to Gaeabrande where Chaos Machina realizes all Seiya's stats are higher than hers, so she transforms into her true form. When Seiya survives, it is revealed that he has been using the Fake Out skill the whole time to hide his true level, which is actually at level 37. Seiya then destroys Chaos Machina, which earns him and Ristarte the town's admiration. However, concerned that Chaos Machina might regenerate, Seiya blankets her charred remains with explosions. In the process, Edona is also destroyed and the formerly thankful Mayor of Edona now tearfully begs them to leave. When Ristarte and Seiya return to the Divine Realm, Ristarte wonders how the situation with Seiya is going to work out.
3	"This Hero Is Too Self-Serving"; Transliteration: "Kono Yūsha wa Migatte Sugiru" (Japanese: この勇者は身勝手すぎる)	October 23, 2019
Seiya realizes that his level increase has started to slow down. Ariadoa suggests he train with a god, so Ristarte introduces Seiya to the Divine Blade God, Cerceus. As the days go by, Ristarte notices Cerceus becoming depressed and even losing weight. On the fourth day of training, she finds Cerceus hiding as Seiya has already surpassed him but still refuses to let him take a break. Cerceus is now so terrified that when Seiya finally catches him, he throws his sword into the ocean, but Seiya simply drags him away. Meanwhile, Ristarte learns from Ishtar that in response to Chaos Machina's death, the Demon Lord plans on sending the demon Deathmagla and an undead army to the town of Seimul where there are two warriors Ishtar has foreseen will be the hero's allies. Ristarte takes Seiya to Seimul, where they meet Mash and Elulu, two dragonkin descendants, at a church. Seiya reveals that Father Marth is an undead in disguise and defeats him without even drawing his sword. He then thoroughly destroys the body with explosions. In the process, he also destroys the church. Afterwards, he bluntly tells Mash and Elulu he does not need them.
4	"I So Don't Need Any Allies"; Transliteration: "Nakama Nante Chō Irana Sugiru" (Japanese: 仲間なんて超いらなすぎる)	October 30, 2019
Outside the destroyed church, Seiya explains to Mash and Elulu the reason why he does not need them. Just then, they are confronted by a group of knights who asks for help. Seiya agrees under the condition that he receives payment. When Seiya and Ristarte arrive in the area where the undead army is, Seiya uses the Meteor Strike skill twice to wipe them out. In Seimul, Elulu tells Ristarte that she has not seen Mash in two days. Heading to Seiya's room, Ristarte learns that Seiya used the Synthesis skill to synthesize a powerful sword. Via a two way viewing mirror, Deathmagla reveals to them that he has kidnapped and tortured Mash. Just as he is about to kill him, Seiya uses the Dimension Blade skill to cut off Deathmagla's hand through the mirror. After receiving Deathmagla's physical location, they arrive there. During the fight, Deathmagla summons Dark Firus. A confident Deathmagla taunts Seiya by revealing what Dark Firus weaknesses are. Seiya explains that he created different magic bracelets allow him to use magic attributes he has not trained with. After he defeats Dark Firus, he turns his attention to a stunned Deathmagla.
5	"This Goddess Is Too Spooky"; Transliteration: "Kono Megami ga Bukimi Sugiru" (Japanese: この女神が不気味すぎる)	November 6, 2019
In Seimul, Seiya tells Mash and Elulu that they will be his baggage carriers. Mash then offers to take Seiya to the Dragons' Den, but Seiya wants to head to the Divine Realm first. There, Seiya has Mash train with Cerceus, while Ristarte has Elulu train with Hestiaca, the Goddess of Fire. Afterwards, Ristarte accidentally bumps into Valkyrie, the Goddess of Destruction. Noticing how powerful she is, Seiya tells Valkyrie to train him. Valkyrie angrily confronts him until Ariadoa stops her. She then arranges for him to train with Adenela, the Goddess of War. After three days of training, Mash has improved, while Elulu's training has mostly failed due to her having no affinity for flame magic. As the party is about to leave, Adenela asks Seiya if she can come with him. Seiya bluntly rejects her offer. When they finally arrive at the Dragon Village, they are met by Lagos, who escorts them to see Leviae, the Great Mother of Dragons. Leviae shows Mash how to transform into a dragon. When Elulu asks Leviae to show her how to transform as well, Leviae tells her that she is to become the mighty weapon Igzasion instead.
6	"The Great Dragon Mother Is Too Sneaky"; Transliteration: "Ryūō nano ni Zuru Sugiru" (Japanese: 竜王なのにズルすぎる)	November 13, 2019
Leviae explains to the party about a legend that states that the Demon Lord can be defeated using Igzasion, which can only be forged when a female dragonkin of human appearance offers her life. When Mash protests, Leviae reveals that the Demon Lord's forces controls seventy percent of Gaeabrande. Leviae then offers everyone a feast prior to conducting the sacred sword ceremony. Later that night, Ristarte, Seiya, and Mash are enjoying the feast. When Elulu has second thoughts, Seiya saves her. Leviae reveals she anticipated that this might happen so she laced their food with a paralytic. However, Seiya counters that he only pretended to eat, explaining why the drug did not work on him. Leviae decides to confront Seiya. When she refuses to lift Elulu's curse, Seiya fights Leviae head on. It appears that she is winning until she notices that she is about to fall into the abyss. Feigning her surrender, Leviae attempts to kill Seiya. However, he manages to defeat her. Afterwards, Igzasion appears. Once the party leaves the village, Seiya admits to Ristarte that the sword he acquired is not Igzasion. They are then confronted by a group of knights.
7	"This Lady Knight Is Too Doglike"; Transliteration: "Kono Onna Kishi ga Inuppo Sugiru" (Japanese: この女騎士が犬っぽすぎる)	November 20, 2019
The Roseguard Imperial Knights asks the party to help them fight the Demon Lord's forces at Olga Fortress. Once they arrive in the area, they see Beel Bub's horde kill several knights. Afterwards, the party meets up with Rosalie Roseguard. They then head to Olga Fortress. Inside, the council holds a strategy meeting. However, Seiya feels that the best course of action is for him to head to Divine Realm. When he calls Rosalie out for being too reckless, she angrily confronts him where she continually gets slapped by him. In the Divine Realm, Seiya asks Ristarte to introduce him to a god who can help him. She takes him to the Verdent Forest to meet Mitis, the Goddess of Archery. While Seiya is training, Ristarte, Mash and Elulu runs into Cerceus, who tells them that Adenela is still angry with Seiya. At Ariadoa's house, Ariadoa agrees to unlock Mash and Elulu's dormant powers. Ristarte then heads to Adenela's house. When she tries to warn Seiya, Adenela confronts him. He is able to calm her down to the point where she is no longer angry with him. Afterwards, it is revealed that Mitis was watching the incident the entire time.
8	"Neat and Tidy but Overly Nymphomaniacal"; Transliteration: "Seiso na Kuse ni Inran Sugiru" (Japanese: 清楚なくせに淫乱すぎる)	November 27, 2019
At Ariadoa's house, Ariadoa shows Ristarte some of the dormant powers that Mash and Elulu have unlocked. When Ristarte tells Ariadoa about Seiya's training with Mitis, a worried Ariadoa reveals that Mitis was banished because she is a nymphomaniacal goddess. When Ristarte attempts to warn Seiya, they see Mitis tied up to a tree. After she frees herself, she lustfully attacks Seiya and Mash. However, Seiya is ultimately able to stop her. The party then heads to Olga Fortress where they learn that Rosalie left. Arriving at Beel Bub's lair, they see him capture Rosalie. Just as he is about to drop her, Ristarte distracts him long enough for Seiya to shoot an arrow at him. Once Rosalie is rescued, Beel Bub turns his attention to Seiya. When he attempts to attack Seiya, he gets killed. After Beel Bub's horde is dealt with, Rosalie reluctantly tells Seiya about a legendary suit of armor in a shrine near the village of Izale. When the party arrives there, they find the village in ruins. They are then confronted by Kilkapul, one of the Four Heavenly Kings, who reveals that he destroyed the armor so Seiya cannot use it.
9	"This Reaper Is Just Too Invincible"; Transliteration: "Shinigami ga Tonikaku Muteki Sugiru" (Japanese: 死神がとにかく無敵すぎる)	December 4, 2019
Kilkapul admits to the party that he knows that he is not powerful enough, so he going to exchange his life to invoke the greatest of summoning magic. Once he does, the reaper Krosde Thanatus is summoned. Seiya has Ristarte send the party to the Divine Realm. When they arrive there, Seiya reveals that he has a plan. On the temple roof, Valkyrie is painting when Krosde Thanatus destroys her piece. After a while, she uses her ultimate skill, Gate of Valhalla, to finally get rid of it. Despite Valkyrie's warning about the skill, Seiya is impressed enough to ask her to train him. Mash and Elulu then decide to head to Ariadoa's house. Meanwhile, Cerceus tells Ristarte that Ishtar wants to see her. At Ishtar's house, Ishtar tells Ristarte that the last of the Four Heavenly Kings is leading an army. The next day, Ristarte arrives at Ariadoa's house to see how advanced Mash and Elulu's training has gone. They then head to Valkyrie's house. Afterwards, they head to Gaeabrande, where they see Wohlks Roseguard easily defeat Eraser Kaiser and his army. When Ristarte wonders why Wohlks does not fight the Demon Lord, he turns into a child.
9.5	"Omnibus"; Transliteration: "Sōshūhen" (Japanese: 総集編)	December 11, 2019
A recap episode summarizing the first six episodes.
10	"This Man Is Too Strong for Being So Old"; Transliteration: "Rōjin nano ni Tsuyo Sugiru" (Japanese: 老人なのに強すぎる)	December 18, 2019
The party is stunned when they see Wohlks turn into a child. Later, the party decides to head to town. Once they are done, they head to the castle. Inside, Rosalie tells them that her father does not have long to live. While the party is meeting with Wohlks, he receives a message that the Demon Lord's forces are attacking the capital. Seiya takes Mash and Elulu with him while he has Ristarte stay behind with Wohlks. When Wohlks shows Ristarte around the cathedral, he reveals that the Demon Lord created a magical item called Chain Destruction, which is capable of destroying the real souls of gods and heroes. He also reveals that he has joined forces with the Demon Lord. Just as he about to kill her, Seiya returns. During the fight, Wohlks becomes a demonkin. Wohlks appears to have the fight won. However, Seiya uses the Counter Break skill to return the same damage back to Wohlks. Once Wohlks is defeated, Seiya has Rosalie speak to her father before he dies. Three days later, Seiya recovers and allows the party to have fun. While Ristarte, Mash, and Elulu are enjoying themselves, Seiya heads off on his own.
11	"The Truth Is Too Much to Bear"; Transliteration: "Sono Shinjitsu wa Omo Sugiru" (Japanese: その真実は重すぎる)	December 25, 2019
Ristarte, Mash, and Elulu spend the day enjoying themselves. When they head back to their hotel room, they notice that Seiya is not there. Heading to Ishtar's house, they find a distraught Ariadoa who escorts them to Ishtar's location. Ishtar reveals that Seiya went to the Demon Lord's castle alone. She also reveals that despite his personality and demeanor, Seiya actually cares about them more than he lets on. She then shows Ristarte footage from 100 years ago when Ariadoa previously summoned Seiya to Ixphoria. Back then, Seiya would recklessly fight enemies while unprepared. When the party fought the Demon Lord, it appeared they had killed him. However, he revealed that he had two lives. As a result, he was able to kill the party, including Seiya, Princess Tiana and their unborn child. After watching the footage, Ishtar reveals to Ristarte that she is the reincarnation of Princess Tiana. Despite warnings from Ariadoa and Ishtar, Ristarte insists on finding Seiya and opens a portal to the Demon Lord's castle, taking Mash and Elulu with her to save their friend.
12	"The Hero Is Overpowered but Overly Cautious"; Transliteration: "Kono Yūsha ga Ore Tsuē Kuse ni Shinchō Sugiru" (Japanese: この勇者が俺TUEEEくせに慎重すぎる)	December 27, 2019 (Note: Episode 12 first aired on AbemaTV on December 27, 2019.)
Ristarte, Mash, and Elulu arrive in the heart of the Demon Lord's castle. Before they can help, however, Seiya unleashes the Gate of Valhalla. Due to the skill's effects, Seiya's life force begins to crumble. Ristarte demands the full use of her healing ability. With her full strength, Ristarte manages to heal Seiya's wounds in time. Before they can celebrate, the Demon Lord again bursts through the doors. Suddenly, Seiya stands up and calls forth a second Gate of Valhalla, finally defeating the Demon Lord once and for all. Seiya then says his goodbyes to his companions and disappears with a smile after he realizes who Ristarte really is. Sometime later, Ristarte is subsequently summoned to be punished. She is informed that she will be sent to save Ixphoria once again, but without any of her divine healing powers, and if she fails, she will be stripped of her divinity. Before Ristarte can accept, Ishtar reveals that the effects of the Chain Destruction were lifted when the second Gate of Valhalla was used. Ristarte receives the note of her hero's information, and cries tears of joy when she sees Seiya's name and impossibly cautious personality written on it.
