= Overlord (novel series) =

Japanese light novel series and its adaptations

- Cover art for the first light novel volume

オーバーロード (Ōbārōdo)
- Genre: Dark fantasy; Isekai
- Novel series
- Written by: Kugane Maruyama
- Published by: Arkadia; Shōsetsuka ni Narō
- Original run: May 9, 2010 – March 30, 2012
- Light novel
- Written by: Kugane Maruyama
- Illustrated by: So-bin
- Published by: Enterbrain
- English publisher: NA: Yen Press
- Original run: July 30, 2012 – present
- Volumes: 16
Further information
Manga
Written by	Satoshi Ōshio
Illustrated by	Hugin Miyama (Part I); Matsuki (Part II)
Published by	Kadokawa Shoten
English publisher	NA: Yen Press
Magazine	Comp Ace
Original run	November 26, 2014 – present
Volumes	23
Anime television series
Directed by	Naoyuki Itō
Produced by	Kazufumi Kikushima; Satoshi Fukao; Noritomo Isogai; Yūki Yoshida; Shō Tanaka (I); Toyokazu Nakahigashi (II–IV)
Written by	Yukie Sugawara
Music by	Shūji Katayama (Team-MAX)
Studio	Madhouse
Licensed by	Crunchyroll (Note: Formerly known as Funimation); SA/SEA: Medialink
Original network	AT-X, Tokyo MX, Sun TV, KBS, TV Aichi, BS11, MBS
Original run	July 7, 2015 – September 27, 2022
Episodes	52
Original video animation
Directed by	Minoru Ashina
Studio	Studio Puyukai
Licensed by	Crunchyroll; SA/SEA: Medialink
Released	September 30, 2016
Original net animation
Overlord: Ple Ple Pleiades
Directed by	Minoru Ashina
Produced by	Minoru Ashina
Studio	Studio Puyukai
Released	September 25, 2015 – July 26, 2022
Episodes	44
Anime film series
Overlord: The Undead King; Overlord: The Dark Warrior
Directed by	Naoyuki Itō
Written by	Yukie Sugawara
Music by	Shūji Katayama (Team-MAX)
Studio	Madhouse
Licensed by	Crunchyroll
Released	February 25, 2017 (Part 1); March 11, 2017 (Part 2)
Runtime	117 minutes (Part 1); 108 minutes (Part 2)
Anime film
Overlord: The Sacred Kingdom (2024)
- icon

Overlord (Japanese: オーバーロード, Hepburn: Ōbārōdo) is a Japanese light novel series written by Kugane Maruyama and illustrated by So-bin. It began serialization online in 2010, before being acquired by Enterbrain. Sixteen volumes have been published since July 2012. A manga adaptation by Satoshi Ōshio, with art by Hugin Miyama, began serialization in Kadokawa Shoten's manga magazine Comp Ace from November 26, 2014. Both the light novels and the manga are licensed in North America by Yen Press since 2016.

The light novels have been adapted into an anime television series produced by Madhouse, consisting of four seasons with thirteen episodes each, with the first season airing from July to September 2015. Two compilation films recapping events from the first season were released in February and March 2017, respectively. The second season ran from January to April 2018, the third season ran from July to October 2018, and the fourth season ran from July to September 2022. A theatrical anime film, set within the fourth season, titled Overlord: The Sacred Kingdom, was released in September 2024.

== Plot ==
In 2126, a Full-Dive massively multiplayer online role-playing game or DMMORPG (VRMMORPG) called YGGDRASIL was released, standing out among all other DMMORPGs due to its unusually high ability for the player to interact with the game. After an intense twelve-year run, the game servers are about to be shut down. Within the game exists a guild, Ainz Ooal Gown, once consisting of 41 members and credited as one of the strongest guilds in the game. Now only four of the members remain, the other 37 having quit the game, and only one, a skeletal Lich "Overlord" character named Momonga, continues to play as the guild leader, maintaining their headquarters in The Great Tomb of Nazarick. In the minutes before the shutdown he invites the remaining guild members, but of those only one appears and only for a short while before leaving. While saddened by this, he accepts the reality that his friends have their other lives to take care of and decides to stay logged in until the servers shut down.

When the shut-down time arrives, Momonga discovers that the game has not vanished; instead, it appears as if Nazarick has been transported to another world altogether and its various NPCs have become actual living beings. Momonga has been trapped in the form of his game avatar, leaving him unable to use the normal player functions such as General Message, or even log out. With no other option, Momonga sets out to learn if any players like himself are in this new world. Taking on the name of the guild, Ainz Ooal Gown, as a message to any other remaining players, Momonga begins exploring the world in an attempt to figure out what has happened while searching for anyone or anything that could help him solve this mystery, while ensuring the safety of Nazarick. Ainz Ooal Gown seems to have modifications made to his behavior by in-game mechanics, because he demonstrates no moral qualms with killing and other actions that are taboo in the real world.

== Media ==
=== Light novels ===
The light novel series written by Maruyama, with illustrations by So-bin, began its serialization online in 2010 via the novel publishing website Arcadia. It was also uploaded to the novel publishing website Shōsetsuka ni Narō in 2012, prior to Enterbrain's acquisition. The first volume was released on July 30, 2012. As of July 29, 2022, sixteen volumes have been released. In the afterword in the second part of the sixteenth volume, it was announced that the series is set to end with its eighteenth volume.

Yen Press announced its license to the series in October 2015 for North America and began publishing the novels in English, with the first volume releasing on May 24, 2016.

No.	Title	Original release date	English release date
1	The Undead King; Fushisha no Ō (不死者の王)	July 30, 2012; 978-4-04-728152-3	May 24, 2016; 978-0-316-27224-7
2	The Dark Warrior; Shikkoku no Senshi (漆黒の戦士)	November 30, 2012; 978-4-04-728451-7	September 27, 2016; 978-0-316-36391-4
3	The Bloody Valkyrie; Senketsu no Ikusa Otome (鮮血の戦乙女)	March 30, 2013; 978-4-04-728689-4	January 24, 2017; 978-0-316-36393-8
4	The Lizardman Heroes; Rizādoman no Yūsha-tachi (蜥蜴人の勇者たち)	July 31, 2013; 978-4-04-728953-6	May 23, 2017; 978-0-316-39759-9
5	The Men of the Kingdom Part I Ōkoku no Otoko-tachi (Jō) (王国の漢たち [上])	December 28, 2013; 978-4-04-729259-8	September 19, 2017; 978-0-316-39761-2
6	The Men of the Kingdom Part II; Ōkoku no Otoko-tachi (Ge) (王国の漢たち [下])	January 31, 2014; 978-4-04-729356-4	January 1, 2018; 978-0-316-39879-4
7	The Invaders of the Great Tomb; Daifunbo no Shinnyūsha (大墳墓の侵入者)	August 30, 2014; 978-4-04-729809-5	May 22, 2018; 978-0-316-39881-7
8	The Two Leaders; Futari no Shidōsha (二人の指導者)	December 26, 2014; 978-4-04-730084-2	September 18, 2018; 978-0-316-39884-8
9	The Caster of Destruction; Hagun no Mahō Eishō-sha (破軍の魔法詠唱者)	June 29, 2015; 978-4-04-730473-4	January 22, 2019; 978-0-316-39886-2
10	The Ruler of Conspiracy; Bōryaku no Tōchisha (謀略の統治者)	May 30, 2016; 978-4-04-734089-3	May 21, 2019; 978-0-316-44498-9
11	The Dwarven Crafter; Yama Kobito no Kōshō (山小人の工匠)	September 30, 2016; 978-4-04-734230-9	October 29, 2019; 978-0-316-44501-6
12	The Paladin of the Sacred Kingdom Part I Sei Ōkoku no Sei Kishi (Jō) (聖王国の聖騎士 [上])	September 30, 2017; 978-4-04-734845-5	June 23, 2020; 978-1-9753-0806-3
13	The Paladin of the Sacred Kingdom Part II; Sei Ōkoku no Sei Kishi (Ge) (聖王国の聖騎士 [下])	April 27, 2018; 978-4-04-734947-6	June 1, 2021; 978-1-9753-1153-7
14	The Witch of the Doomed Kingdom; Mekkoku no Majo (滅国の魔女)	March 12, 2020; 978-4-04-735885-0	June 28, 2022; 978-1-9753-2380-6
15	The Half-Elf Demigod Part I Han Mori Yōsei no Shinjin (Jō) (半森妖精の神人 [上])	June 30, 2022; 978-4-04-736555-1	March 21, 2023; 978-1-9753-6056-6
16	The Half-Elf Demigod Part II; Han Mori Yōsei no Shinjin (Ge) (半森妖精の神人 [下])	July 29, 2022; 978-4-04-736556-8	July 18, 2023; 978-1-9753-6780-0

=== Manga ===
A manga adaptation by Satoshi Ōshio, illustrated Hugin Miyama, was serialized in Kadokawa Shoten's manga magazine Comp Ace from November 26, 2014, to May 25, 2023.

A sequel manga series, titled Overlord New World, illustrated by Matsuki, started in the same magazine on April 26, 2024.

No.	Original release date	Original ISBN	English release date	English ISBN
Part 1
1	June 26, 2015	978-4-04-103071-4	June 28, 2016	978-0-316-27227-8
2	July 25, 2015	978-4-04-103072-1	September 27, 2016	978-0-316-39766-7
3	December 26, 2015	978-4-04-103857-4	December 13, 2016	978-0-316-43425-6
4	June 25, 2016	978-4-04-104399-8	October 31, 2017	978-0-316-47643-0
5	August 26, 2016	978-4-04-104400-1	January 23, 2018	978-0-316-51724-9
6	December 26, 2016	978-4-04-104679-1	April 17, 2018	978-0-316-51727-0
7	May 24, 2017	978-4-04-105764-3	July 24, 2018	978-1-9753-5335-3
8	December 26, 2017	978-4-04-106389-7	November 13, 2018	978-1-9753-2813-9
9	April 26, 2018	978-4-04-106390-3	February 19, 2019	978-1-9753-8284-1
10	July 26, 2018	978-4-04-107168-7	May 21, 2019	978-1-9753-5739-9
11	February 26, 2019	978-4-04-107896-9	September 24, 2019	978-1-9753-3230-3
12	September 24, 2019	978-4-04-108688-9	May 19, 2020	978-1-9753-1296-1
13	March 24, 2020	978-4-04-108689-6	June 1, 2021	978-1-9753-2309-7
14	November 25, 2020	978-4-04-110815-4	November 16, 2021	978-1-9753-2335-6
15	July 26, 2021	978-4-04-111589-3	August 23, 2022	978-1-9753-4485-6
16	January 26, 2022	978-4-04-111590-9	November 22, 2022	978-1-9753-5994-2
17	June 24, 2022	978-4-04-112615-8	May 23, 2023	978-1-9753-6640-7
18	March 25, 2023	978-4-04-113501-3	February 20, 2024	978-1-9753-7954-4
19	December 26, 2023	978-4-04-114353-7	October 15, 2024	979-8-8554-0381-7
Part 2
1	September 25, 2024	978-4-04-115221-8	—	—
2	March 25, 2025	978-4-04-115865-4	—	—
3	October 23, 2025	978-4-04-116482-2	—	—
4	March 26, 2026	978-4-04-117093-9	—	—

=== Anime ===
A 13-episode anime television series adaptation produced by Madhouse aired between July 7 and September 29, 2015. The opening theme is "Clattanoia" by OxT, and the ending theme is "L.L.L." by Myth & Roid. Both are bands of the musician Tom-H@ck. A 30-minute original video animation was bundled with the eleventh limited edition volume of the light novel series, which was released on September 30, 2016. Two compilation films serving as a recap to the first season were released in 2017; the first compilation film, titled Overlord: The Undead King (劇場版総集編 オーバーロード 不死者の王, Gekijō-ban Sōshūhen Ōbārōdo: Fushisha no Ō), was released on February 25, 2017, while the second compilation film, titled Overlord: The Dark Warrior (劇場版総集編 オーバーロード 漆黒の戦士, Gekijō-ban Sōshūhen Ōbārōdo: Shikkoku no Senshi), was released on March 11, 2017. The films' theme song, titled "Crazy Scary Holy Fantasy", was performed by Myth & Roid.

A second season was announced at film screenings of the second compilation film. It premiered on January 9, 2018. It ran for a total of 13 episodes. Outside of Asia, Funimation has licensed the second season for a simuldub. Following Sony's acquisition of Crunchyroll, the series was moved to Crunchyroll. In South and Southeast Asia, Medialink holds the rights to the series. The opening theme is "Go Cry Go" by OxT and the ending theme is "Hydra" by Myth & Roid.

A third season premiered on July 10, 2018. The opening theme is "Voracity" by Myth & Roid, and the ending theme song is "Silent Solitude" by OxT.

On May 8, 2021, a fourth season was announced. The staff and cast members returned to reprise their roles for the fourth season, which aired from July 5 to September 27, 2022. The opening theme is "Hollow Hunger" by OxT, and the ending theme is "No Man's Dawn" by Mayu Maeshima. On July 18, 2022, Crunchyroll announced an English dub for the fourth season, which began streaming on July 19.

=== Film ===
A theatrical anime film was announced alongside the TV anime's fourth season, covering the "Sacred Kingdom" arc from the light novels that was skipped over in that season. Also produced by Madhouse, it premiered with regular screenings in Japan on September 20, 2024, while an advanced IMAX screening began one week earlier on September 13.

=== Crossover ===
A comedy crossover anime series titled Isekai Quartet features characters from Overlord in a chibi style. It also features characters from KonoSuba: God's Blessing on This Wonderful World!, Re:Zero − Starting Life in Another World, The Saga of Tanya the Evil, The Rising of the Shield Hero, Cautious Hero: The Hero Is Overpowered but Overly Cautious, and The Eminence in Shadow, whose light novels are all published under divisions owned by Kadokawa Future Publishing. It began airing on April 9, 2019.

=== Video games ===
A mobile game titled Mass for the Dead was launched in late 2019 in Japan, with a global (English) version launched in early 2020. It received poor reviews, with reviewers noting it was rather simple and did not offer anything new compared to many other similar gacha games. The global version has been shut down as of March 31, 2021.

A Metroidvania game titled Overlord: Escape from Nazarick was announced on December 17, 2021, for Nintendo Switch and PC via Steam and was released on June 16, 2022.

Overlord: Lord of Nazarick, a turn-based gacha video game, was released worldwide for iOS and Android devices on October 29, 2024.

== Reception ==
By June 2015, prior to the release of the anime and manga, the light novel series had about 600,000 copies in print in Japan with eight volumes. By August 1, 2015, the light novel and manga series had a total of 1 million copies in circulation in Japan. On August 4, a 600,000-copy reprint of the novels was announced. By August 20, 2015, the nine-volume Overlord light novel series and two-volume manga series have, together, more than 1.5 million copies in circulation in Japan. By September 18, 2015, Overlord light novel and manga has over 2 million copies in circulation. By May 2016, the Overlord light novel series had 2.5 million copies in print. Overlord was the top-selling light novel series of 2015. By April 2018, the light novel and manga combined had over 7 million copies in print. By December 2021, the light novel and manga combined had over 11 million copies in circulation.

The light novel ranked first in 2017 in Takarajimasha's annual light novel guide book Kono Light Novel ga Sugoi!, in the tankōbon category. It ranked fourth in 2018.

In reviewing the anime adaptation, Kotaku called the Overlord anime a "magnificent power fantasy" which "brings up a very relatable theme for anyone who has played an MMORPG before."

== See also ==
- Blade & Bastard, another light novel series with the same illustrator
- Yakitori: Soldiers of Misfortune, a novel series with the same illustrator
