= List of The Saga of Tanya the Evil volumes =

The Saga of Tanya the Evil, known in Japan as Yōjo Senki (幼女戦記; lit. The Military Chronicles of a Little Girl), is a Japanese light novel series written by Carlo Zen and illustrated by Shinobu Shinotsuki. It was initially serialized on the web novel hosting website Arcadia, before Enterbrain's acquisition. The first volume was released on October 31, 2013, and fourteen volumes have been released. A manga adaptation with art by Chika Tōjō began serialization in Kadokawa Shoten's Comp Ace magazine from April 26, 2016, and has been collected into 35 volumes.

== Light novels ==
No.	Title	Original release date	English release date
1	Deus lo Vult	October 31, 2013; 978-4-04-729173-7	December 19, 2017; 978-0-316-51244-2
Chapter 0: Prologue; Chapter I: The Sky over Norden; Chapter II: The Elinium Type 95 Computation Orb; Chapter III: The Watch/Guard on the Rhine; Chapter IV: War College; Chapter V: The Primeval Battalion
2	Plus Ultra	May 31, 2014; 978-4-04-729569-8	March 20, 2018; 978-0-316-51246-6
Chapter I: The Dacian War; Chapter II: Norden I; Chapter III: Norden II; Chapter IV: The Devil off the Coast of Norden; Chapter V: The Devil of the Rhine; Chapter VI: Ordeal of Fire; Chapter VII: Preparation to Move Forward; Side Story: A Borrowed Cat
3	The Finest Hour	November 29, 2014; 978-4-04-730037-8	July 31, 2018; 978-0-316-51248-0
Chapter I: Open Sesame; Chapter II: The Intervention, Which Was Too Late; Chapter III: Operation Ark; Chapter IV: How to Use Victory; Chapter V: Internal Affairs; Chapter VI: The Southern Campaign
4	Dabit Deus His Quoque Finem	June 29, 2015; 978-4-04-730474-1	November 27, 2018; 978-0-316-56062-7
Chapter I: A Long-Range Reconnaissance Mission; Chapter II: A Goodwill Visit; Chapter III: A Magnificent Victory; Chapter IV: Reorganization; Chapter V: The Battle of Dodobird; Chapter VI: Operation Door Knocker
5	Abyssus Abyssum Invocat	January 30, 2016; 978-4-04-730902-9	March 26, 2019; 978-0-316-56069-6
Chapter 0: A Letter Home; Chapter I: Rapid Advance; Chapter II: Strange Friendship; Chapter III: Northern Operation; Chapter IV: Long-Range Assault Operation; Chapter V: Out of Time; Chapter VI: "Liberator"
6	Nil Admirari	July 30, 2016; 978-4-04-734210-1	July 30, 2019; 978-0-316-56071-9
Chapter I: Winter Operation: Limited Offensive; Chapter II: Paradox; Chapter III: Lull in the Wind; Chapter IV: Diplomatic Deal; Chapter V: Portent; Chapter VI: Structural Problems
7	Ut Sementem Feceris, ita Metes	December 28, 2016; 978-4-04-734407-5	June 23, 2020; 978-0-316-56074-0
Chapter I: Disarray; Chapter II: Restoration; Chapter III: Effort and Ingenuity; Chapter IV: Operation Iron Hammer; Chapter V: Turning Point; Chapter VI: Excessive Triumph
8	In Omnia Paratus	June 30, 2017; 978-4-04-734655-0	December 22, 2020; 978-1-9753-1049-3
Chapter I: A Journalist's Memories of the Eastern Front; Chapter II: Andromeda Eve; Chapter III: Andromeda; Chapter IV: Encounter and Engage; Chapter V: Pocket; Chapter VI: Hans von Zettour
9	Omnes una Manet Nox	January 12, 2018; 978-4-04-734877-6	January 18, 2022; 978-1-9753-1086-8
Chapter I: Erosion; Chapter II: The Home Front; Chapter III: Necessity Is the Mother of Invention; Chapter IV: Love from Underwater; Chapter V: Sightseeing; Chapter VI: At Dusk
10	Viribus Unitis	September 29, 2018; 978-4-04-735326-8	May 24, 2022; 978-1-9753-1052-3
Chapter 0: Prologue; Chapter I: Blueprint; Chapter II: Con Artist; Chapter III: Boss; Chapter IV: Value Verification; Chapter V: Imperial Door Knocker; Chapter VI: Hourglass
11	Alea Iacta Est	February 20, 2019; 978-4-04-735496-8	December 20, 2022; 978-1-9753-1054-7
Chapter I: Create a Rift; Chapter II: Memoir; Chapter III: The Incident; Chapter IV: Turning Point; Chapter V: Stage; Chapter VI: Impact
12	Mundus Vult Decipi, Ergo Decipiatur	February 20, 2020; 978-4-04-735734-1	September 19, 2023; 978-1-9753-2352-3
Chapter 0: Prologue; Chapter I: The World's Enemy; Chapter II: The Stage; Chapter III: An Appointment; Chapter IV: A Temporary Visitor; Chapter V: Hard Work; Chapter VI: The Logistics of War
13	Dum Spiro, Spero — Part 1	August 30, 2023; 978-4-04-736819-4	December 17, 2024; 979-8-8554-0287-2
Chapter 0: Prologue; Chapter I: End of the Beginning; Chapter II: House of Cards; Chapter III: Last Ditch; Chapter IV: Setback; Chapter V: Dawn; Chapter VI: Mutiny
14	Dum Spiro, Spero — Part 2	September 29, 2023; 978-4-04-737595-6	October 21, 2025; 979-8-8554-0289-6
Chapter I: In the Name of Duty; Chapter II: Untimely AirLand Battle Doctrine; Chapter III: Liar Today, Thief Tomorrow; Chapter IV: Professionalism; Chapter V: Mage Graveyard; Chapter VI: By a Whisker; Chapter VII: Living the Dream

== Manga ==
No.	Original release date	Original ISBN	English release date	English ISBN
1	December 10, 2016	978-4-04-105125-2	February 6, 2018	978-0-316-44404-0
1. "The Sky over Norden" (北辺の空, Hokuhen no Sora); 2. "The Elinium Type 95" (工レ二ウム九五式, Erenium 95-shiki); 3. "Guarding the Rhine I" (ラインの護りI, Rain no Mamori I)
In June 1923, a young Empire soldier, Tanya, has a flash back to when she was a salaryman in 2013. She recalls the first conversation she has with a deity claiming to be God, Tanya dubs the deity Being X. She was subsequently reincarnated as a young girl into another world. She grows up and after discovering her aptitude for magic, joins the Imperial Army. On her first training deployment she is targeted by an unexpected enemy counterattack and is forced to engage alone. Unable to withstand, she blows herself and surrounding enemies up in an attempted suicide attack. In the capital Berun, Erich von Rerugen broods over Tanya's military record, contemplating whether she is a monster or a hero. After her first mission, Tanya is ordered to test an experimental operation orb, the Type 95 Elinium Operation Orb. After many experiments with the orb, it was deemed unsuccessful and its development discontinued. However, just before the project is discontinued, Tanya is sent to test the orb again with a promise of success. In the midst of the test, the operation orb is about to explode and kill her. However, an intervention by Being X prevents this and makes the Type 95 function, thereby creating a miracle. Using the orb forces her to pray or praise god involuntarily. At the boarding house of the Imperial Army Cadet Corps, Viktoriya Ivanovna Serebryakov is having breakfast while discussing her new platoon leader (Tanya). Tanya has received her reassignment from the technology department and will depart to the frontline against the Republic of François. She is named leader of a flight in the 205th Assault Mage Squadron under the command of the Squadron Commander Lieutenant Iren Schwarzkopf. After a short briefing of the Rhine front situation she went to greet her new squadron consisting of two volunteers and a conscript Visha (Serebryakov) to which she expresses some respect for performing her duties as a citizen.
2	December 26, 2016	978-4-04-105126-9	May 22, 2018	978-0-316-44407-1
4. "Guarding the Rhine II" (ラインの護りII, Rain no Mamori II); 5. "Guarding the Rhine III" (ラインの護りIII, Rain no Mamori III); 6. "War College I - Admissions Committee" (軍大学I 大学選考軍議会, Gundaigaku I - Daigaku Senkō Gungikai)
3	January 26, 2017	978-4-04-105127-6	July 24, 2018	978-1-9753-5337-7
7. "War College II - Total War Theory" (軍大学II 総力戦理論, Gundaigaku II - Sōryokusen Riron); 8. "War College III - Creating the Quick Reaction Mage Battalion" (軍大学III 即応魔導大隊構想, Gundaigaku III - Sokuō Madō Daitai Kōsō); 9. "Andrew's Report: On the Mysteries of the Eleventh Goddess and V600" (アンドリューレポート：「十一番目の女神」と「V600」についての謎, Andoryū Repōto: "11-banme no Megami" to "V600" Nitsuite no Nazo)
4	April 10, 2017	978-4-04-105533-5	October 30, 2018	978-1-9753-5374-2
10. "The Primeval Battalion I" (始まりの大隊I, Hajimari no Daitai I); 11. "The Primeval Battalion II" (始まりの大隊II, Hajimari no Daitai II)
5	May 10, 2017	978-4-04-105534-2	January 22, 2019	978-1-9753-5375-9
12. "The Dacian War I" (ダキア戦役I, Dacia Sen'eki I); 13. "The Dacian War II" (ダキア戦役II, Dacia Sen'eki II); 14. "Norden I" (ノルデンI, Noruden I)
6	June 9, 2017	978-4-04-105766-7	April 30, 2019	978-1-9753-0413-3
15. "Norden II" (ノルデンII, Noruden II); 16. "Norden III" (ノルデンIII, Noruden III); 17. "Norden IV" (ノルデンIV, Noruden IV); 18. "Norden V" (ノルデンV, Noruden V)
7	November 10, 2017 (Special Edition); November 25, 2017 (Regular Edition)	978-4-04-105767-4	July 23, 2019	978-1-9753-5778-8
19. "Norden VI" (ノルデンVI, Noruden VI); 20. "Norden VII" (ノルデンVII, Noruden VII); 21. "Norden VIII" (ノルデンVIII, Noruden VIII)
8	February 26, 2018	978-4-04-106544-0	October 29, 2019	978-1-9753-5781-8
22. "Norden IX" (ノルデンIX, Noruden XI); 23. "Devil of the Norden Coast I" (ノルデン海岸の悪魔I, Norden Kaigan no Akuma I); 24. "Devil of the Norden Coast II" (ノルデン海岸の悪魔II, Norden Kaigan no Akuma II)
9	April 26, 2018	978-4-04-106943-1	January 21, 2020	978-1-9753-5784-9
25. "Devil of the Norden Coast III" (ノルデン海岸の悪魔III, Norden Kaigan no Akuma III); 26. "Devil of the Norden Coast IV" (ノルデン海岸の悪魔IV, Norden Kaigan no Akuma IV)
10	September 25, 2018	978-4-04-106944-8	June 23, 2020	978-1-9753-1088-2
27. "Devil of the Norden Coast V" (ノルデン海岸の悪魔V, Norden Kaigan no Akuma V); 28. "Devil of the Norden Coast VI" (ノルデン海岸の悪魔VI, Norden Kaigan no Akuma VI)
11	November 24, 2018	978-4-04-106945-5	September 22, 2020	978-1-9753-1091-2
29. "The Devil of the Rhine I" (悪魔のラインI, Akuma no Rain I); 30. "The Devil of the Rhine II" (悪魔のラインII, Akuma no Rain II)
12	January 25, 2019	978-4-04-106946-2	December 15, 2020	978-1-9753-1094-3
31. "The Devil of the Rhine III" (悪魔のラインIII, Akuma no Rain III); 32. "The Devil of the Rhine IV" (悪魔のラインIV, Akuma no Rain IV); 33. "The Devil of the Rhine V" (悪魔のラインV, Akuma no Rain V)
13	April 25, 2019	978-4-04-108117-4	February 23, 2021	978-1-9753-1097-4
34. "The Devil of the Rhine VI" (悪魔のラインVI, Akuma no Rain VI); 35. "Ordeal of Fire I" (火の試練 I, Hi no Shiren I); 36. "Ordeal of Fire II" (火の試練 II, Hi no Shiren II); 37. "Ordeal of Fire III" (火の試練 III, Hi no Shiren III)
14	May 24, 2019	978-4-04-108118-1	June 8, 2021	978-1-9753-1100-1
38. "Ordeal of Fire IV" (火の試練 IV, Hi no Shiren IV); 39. "Ordeal of Fire V" (火の試練 V, Hi no Shiren V); 40. "Andrew's Report: The Arene Massacre" (アンドリューレポート：アレーネ虐殺, Andoryū Repōto: Arēne Gyakusatsu)
15	July 25, 2019	978-4-04-108119-8	November 30, 2021	978-1-9753-1103-2
41. "Preparation to Move Forward I" (事前準備 I, Jizen Junbi I); 42. "Preparation to Move Forward II" (事前準備 II, Jizen Junbi II); 43. "Preparation to Move Forward III" (事前準備 III, Jizen Junbi III)
16	October 25, 2019	978-4-04-108120-4	May 10, 2022	978-1-9753-4258-6
44. "Open Sesame I" (開けゴマ I, Hirakegoma I); 45. "Open Sesame II" (開けゴマ II, Hirakegoma II); 46. "Open Sesame III" (開けゴマ III, Hirakegoma III)
17	January 23, 2020	978-4-04-109035-0	July 19, 2022	978-1-9753-4260-9
47. "The Royal Army Historical War Records" (英国陸軍戦争局アーカイブの記録, Igirisu Rikugun Sensō-Kyoku Ākaibu no Kiroku); 48. "Open Sesame IV" (開けゴマ IV, Hirakegoma IV); 49. "Open Sesame V" (開けゴマ V, Hirakegoma V); 50. "The Intervention, Which Was Too Late I" (遅すぎた介入I, Oso Sugita Kainyū I)
18	April 25, 2020	978-4-04-109330-6	January 17, 2023	978-1-9753-4262-3
51. "The Intervention, Which Was Too Late II" (遅すぎた介入II, Oso Sugita Kainyū II); 52. "The Intervention, Which Was Too Late III" (遅すぎた介入III, Oso Sugita Kainyū III)
19	July 21, 2020	978-4-04-109331-3	April 18, 2023	978-1-9753-4264-7
53. "The Intervention, Which Was Too Late IV" (遅すぎた介入IV, Oso Sugita Kainyū IV); 54. "The Intervention, Which Was Too Late V" (遅すぎた介入V, Oso Sugita Kainyū V); 55. "Operation Ark Begins I" (箱舟作戦発動I, Hakofune Sakusen Hatsudō I); 56. "Operation Ark Begins II" (箱舟作戦発動II, Hakofune Sakusen Hatsudō II)
20	December 26, 2020	978-4-04-109991-9	August 22, 2023	978-1-9753-4266-1
57. "How to Use Victory I" (勝利の使い方I, Shōri no Tsukaikata I); 58. "How to Use Victory II" (勝利の使い方II, Shōri no Tsukaikata II); 59. "How to Use Victory III" (勝利の使い方III, Shōri no Tsukaikata III); 60. "How to Use Victory IV" (勝利の使い方IV, Shōri no Tsukaikata IV)
21	May 26, 2021	978-4-04-111352-3	November 21, 2023	978-1-9753-4268-5
61. "The Southern Campaign I" (南方戦役I, Nanpō Sen'eki I); 62. "The Southern Campaign II" (南方戦役II, Nanpō Sen'eki II)
22	June 25, 2021	978-4-04-111449-0	March 19, 2024	978-1-9753-4270-8
63. "The Southern Campaign III" (南方戦役III, Nanpō Sen'eki III); 64. "The Southern Campaign IV" (南方戦役IV, Nanpō Sen'eki IV); 65. "The Southern Campaign V" (南方戦役V, Nanpō Sen'eki V); 66. "The Southern Campaign VI" (南方戦役VI, Nanpō Sen'eki VI)
23	October 26, 2021	978-4-04-112103-0	July 30, 2024	978-1-9753-6279-9
67. "The Southern Campaign VII" (南方戦役VII, Nanpō Sen'eki VII); 68. "The Southern Campaign VIII" (南方戦役VIII, Nanpō Sen'eki VIII); 69. "The Southern Campaign IX" (南方戦役IX, Nanpō Sen'eki IX); 70. "The Southern Campaign X" (南方戦役X, Nanpō Sen'eki X)
24	March 26, 2022	978-4-04-112377-5	October 15, 2024	978-1-9753-6281-2
71. "Scorching Autumn I" (灼熱の秋I, Shakunetsu no Aki I); 72. "Scorching Autumn II" (灼熱の秋II, Shakunetsu no Aki II); 73. "Scorching Autumn III" (灼熱の秋III, Shakunetsu no Aki III); 74. "Scorching Autumn IV" (灼熱の秋IV, Shakunetsu no Aki IV)
25	July 26, 2022	978-4-04-112702-5	February 18, 2025	978-1-9753-6960-6
75. "A Long-Range Reconnaissance Mission I" (長距離偵察任務I, Chōkyori Teisatsu Ninmu I); 76. "A Long-Range Reconnaissance Mission II" (長距離偵察任務II, Chōkyori Teisatsu Ninmu II); 77. "A Long-Range Reconnaissance Mission III" (長距離偵察任務III, Chōkyori Teisatsu Ninmu III); 78. "A Long-Range Reconnaissance Mission IV" (長距離偵察任務IV, Chōkyori Teisatsu Ninmu IV); 79. "A Long-Range Reconnaissance Mission V" (長距離偵察任務V, Chōkyori Teisatsu Ninmu V); 80. "A Long-Range Reconnaissance Mission VI" (長距離偵察任務VI, Chōkyori Teisatsu Ninmu VI)
26	November 25, 2022	978-4-04-112703-2	June 24, 2025	978-1-9753-7677-2
81. "A Long-Range Reconnaissance Mission VII" (長距離偵察任務VII, Chōkyori Teisatsu Ninmu VII); 82. "Apostle's Awakening I" (使途の目覚めI, Shito no Mezame I); 83. "Apostle's Awakening II" (使途の目覚めII, Shito no Mezame II)
27	March 25, 2023	978-4-04-112704-9	December 2, 2025	979-8-8554-0077-9
84. "A Goodwill Visit I" (親善訪問I, Shinzen Hōmon I); 85. "A Goodwill Visit II" (親善訪問II, Shinzen Hōmon II); 86. "A Goodwill Visit III" (親善訪問III, Shinzen Hōmon III)
28	August 25, 2023	978-4-04-113894-6	May 26, 2026	979-8-8554-0079-3
87. "A Goodwill Visit IV" (親善訪問IV, Shinzen Hōmon IV); 88. "A Magnificent Victory I" (完璧な勝利I, Kanpekina Shōri I); 89. "A Magnificent Victory II" (完璧な勝利II, Kanpekina Shōri II); 90. "A Magnificent Victory III" (完璧な勝利III, Kanpekina Shōri III)
29	January 26, 2024	978-4-04-113895-3	November 24, 2026	979-8-8554-0684-9
91. "A Magnificent Victory IV" (完璧な勝利IV, Kanpekina Shōri IV); 92. "A Magnificent Victory V" (完璧な勝利V, Kanpekina Shōri V); 93. "A Magnificent Victory VI" (完璧な勝利VI, Kanpekina Shōri VI)
30	July 25, 2024	978-4-04-113896-0	—	—
94. "A Magnificent Victory VII" (完璧な勝利VII, Kanpekina Shōri VII); 95. "A Magnificent Victory VIII" (完璧な勝利VIII, Kanpekina Shōri VIII); 96. "A Magnificent Victory IX" (完璧な勝利IX, Kanpekina Shōri IX); 97. "A Magnificent Victory X" (完璧な勝利X, Kanpekina Shōri X); 98. "Reorganization I" (再編I, Saihen I)
31	December 26, 2024	978-4-04-115840-1	—	—
99. "Reorganization II" (再編II, Saihen II); 100. "Reorganization III" (再編III, Saihen III); 101. "Reorganization IV" (再編IV, Saihen IV); 102. "Reorganization V" (再編V, Saihen V); 103. "Reorganization VI" (再編VI, Saihen VI)
32	July 25, 2025	978-4-04-116221-7	—	—
104. "Reorganization VII" (再編Ⅶ, Saihen VII); 105. "Reorganization VIII" (再編Ⅷ, Saihen VIII); 106. "The Battle of Dodobird I" (ドードーバード航空戦Ⅰ, Dōdō Bādo kōkū-sen Ⅰ); 107. "The Battle of Dodobird II" (ドードーバード航空戦Ⅱ, Dōdō Bādo kōkū-sen ⅠⅠ); 108. "The Battle of Dodobird III" (ドードーバード航空戦Ⅲ, Dōdō Bādo kōkū-sen ⅠⅠⅠ)
33	December 26, 2025	978-4-04-116748-9	—	—
109. "The Battle of Dodobird IV" (ドードーバード航空戦IV, Dōdō Bādo kōkū-sen IV); 110. "The Battle of Dodobird V" (ドードーバード航空戦V, Dōdō Bādo kōkū-sen V); 111. "The Battle of Dodobird VI" (ドードーバード航空戦VI, Dōdō Bādo kōkū-sen VI); 112. "The Battle of Dodobird VII" (ドードーバード航空戦VII, Dōdō Bādo kōkū-sen VII)
34	March 26, 2026	978-4-04-117263-6	—	—
113. "The Battle of Dodobird VIII" (ドードーバード航空戦VIII, Dōdō Bādo kōkū-sen VIII); 114. "The Battle of Dodobird IX" (ドードーバード航空戦IX, Dōdō Bādo kōkū-sen IX); 115. "The Battle of Dodobird X" (ドードーバード航空戦X, Dōdō Bādo kōkū-sen X)
35	August 25, 2026	978-4-04-117676-4	—	—
116. "Encounter I" (邂逅I, Kaigō I); 117. "Encounter II" (邂逅II, Kaigō II); 118. "Encounter III" (邂逅III, Kaigō III); 119. "Encounter IV" (邂逅IV, Kaigō IV)
