= Jingo Jungle =

Single by Myth & Roid
- Language: Japanese, English
- Released: February 8, 2017
- Genre: J-pop
- Length: 3:50
- Label: Kadokawa
- Composer(s): Tom-H@ck
- Lyricist(s): hotaru
- Producer(s): Tom-H@ck

Myth & Roid singles chronology
"Paradisus-Paradoxum" (2016)	"Jingo Jungle" (2017)	"Hydra" (2018)

"Jingo Jungle", stylized "JINGO JUNGLE", is the fifth single by Japanese pop rock band Myth & Roid. The single was released on February 8, 2017.

The single sold 4,831 copies in its first week of release, peaking at no. 22 on the Oricon Singles Chart.

== Usage and appearances in other media ==
"Jingo Jungle" was used as the opening for the first season of the anime The Saga of Tanya the Evil.

The HBB remix of the song appeared on the band's debut album eYe's. The original version of "Jingo Jungle" later appeared on the band's 2020 compilation album Museum–The Best of Myth & Roid–.

== Track listing ==
No.	Title	Length
1.	"Jingo Jungle"	3:50
2.	"Frozen Rain"	3:50
3.	"Jingo Jungle" (Instrumental)	3:50
4.	"Frozen Rain" (Instrumental)	3:48

== Charts ==
Chart (2017)	Peak position
Japan (Oricon)	22
Japan Hot 100 (Billboard)	11

== Personnel ==
Myth & Roid

- Mayu Maeshima – vocals
- Tom-h@ck – guitar, programming, composer, producer
- hotaru – keyboards, lyrics
