= Full Dive =

Japanese light novel series and its franchise

- Full Dive: This Ultimate Next-Gen Full Dive RPG Is Even Shittier than Real Life!
- First light novel volume cover, featuring Reona Kisaragi (above) and Hiroshi Yuki (below)

究極進化したフルダイブRPGが現実よりもクソゲーだったら (Kyūkyoku Shinka shita Furu Daibu RPG ga Genjitsu yori mo Kusoge Dattara)
- Light novel
- Written by: Light Tuchihi
- Illustrated by: Youta
- Published by: Media Factory
- Imprint: MF Bunko J
- Original run: August 25, 2020 – present
- Volumes: 4
- Manga
- Written by: Light Tuchihi
- Illustrated by: Kino
- Published by: Media Factory
- Magazine: Monthly Comic Alive
- Original run: January 27, 2021 – January 27, 2022
- Volumes: 2
- Anime television series
- Directed by: Kazuya Miura
- Written by: Kenta Ihara
- Music by: Ryosuke Nakanishi
- Studio: ENGI
- Licensed by: Crunchyroll (Note: In North America through Crunchyroll, LLC (formerly known as Funimation).)
- Original network: AT-X, Tokyo MX, SUN, KBS Kyoto, BS11
- Original run: April 7, 2021 – June 23, 2021
- Episodes: 12
- icon

Full Dive, short for Full Dive: This Ultimate Next-Gen Full Dive RPG Is Even Shittier than Real Life! (Japanese: 究極進化したフルダイブRPGが現実よりもクソゲーだったら, Hepburn: Kyūkyoku Shinka shita Furu Daibu RPG ga Genjitsu yori mo Kusogē Dattara), is a Japanese light novel series written by Light Tuchihi and illustrated by Youta. Media Factory has published four volumes since August 2020 under their MF Bunko J imprint. A manga adaptation with art by Kino was serialized in Media Factory's seinen manga magazine Monthly Comic Alive from January 2021 to January 2022. An anime television series adaptation by ENGI aired from April to June 2021.

== Plot ==
Hiroshi Yuki, with the player name of Hiro, is a high school boy who loves to play virtual reality MMORPGs (VRMMORPG) in order to escape reality. When a game store manager named Reona Kisaragi tricks him into buying the game Kiwame Quest, he soon discovers that it is not what it seems. Unlike regular games, it is a game that tries to pursue realism to a fanatical point. As such, Hiroshi struggles to eke out a niche. Despite the disadvantages, he is determined to complete the game.

== Characters ==
=== Main characters ===
Hiroshi Yuki (結城宏, Yūki Hiroshi)
Voiced by: Daiki Yamashita, Riho Sugiyama (young) (Japanese); Johnny Yong Bosch, Michele Knotz (young) (English)
Hiroshi is a high school student who is tricked into buying Kiwame Quest by game store manager, Reona Kisaragi. He is a former member of the track team who quit following an unfortunate incident and he likes to play VRMMORPGs in order to escape reality. His player name is Hiro.
Reona Kisaragi (如月玲於奈, Kisaragi Reona)
Voiced by: Ayana Taketatsu (Japanese); Natalie Van Sistine (English)
Reona is a game store manager who tricks Hiroshi into buying Kiwame Quest. She likes to tease him and her in-game avatar is that of a fairy.
Alicia (アリシア, Arishia)
Voiced by: Fairouz Ai (Japanese); Kayli Mills (English)
Alicia is one of Hiroshi's childhood friends in Kiwame Quest. She has an older brother named Martin in-game.
Mizarisa (ミザリサ)
Voiced by: Shiori Izawa (Japanese); Sarah Anne Williams (English)
Mizarisa is the town inquisitor in Kiwame Quest.
Kaede Yuki (結城楓, Yūki Kaede)
Voiced by: Aoi Koga (Japanese); Kate Bristol (English)
Kaede is Hiroshi's younger sister. She used to look up to her older brother, but their relationship has been strained ever since he quit the track team.

=== NPCs ===
Martin (マーチン, Māchin)
Voiced by: Haruki Ishiya, Natsumi Fujiwara (young) (Japanese); Ben Lepley, Krystal LaPorte (young) (English)
Martin is one of Hiroshi's childhood friends in Kiwame Quest. He is also Alicia's older brother in-game.
Tesla (テスラ, Tesura)
Voiced by: Satoshi Hino (Japanese); Jason Liebrecht (English)
Tesla is the captain of the City Guard in Kiwame Quest.
Govern (ガバン, Gaban)
Voiced by: Shizuka Itō (Japanese); Lisa Ortiz (English)
Govern is the queen of Ted in Kiwame Quest.

=== Other characters ===
Ginji (ギンジ)
Voiced by: Katsuyuki Konishi (Japanese); Brent Mukai (English)
Ginji is a veteran player of Kiwame Quest.
Soichiro Kamui (神居宗一郎, Kamui Sōichirō)
Voiced by: Yoshitsugu Matsuoka (Japanese); Samuel Drake (English)
Kamui is the only known player who has successfully completed Kiwame Quest.

== Media ==
=== Light novels ===
Light Tuchihi launched the light novel series, with illustrations by Youta, under Media Factory's MF Bunko J label on August 25, 2020.

==== Volumes ====
No.	Release date	ISBN
1	August 25, 2020	978-4-04-064807-1
2	December 25, 2020	978-4-04-064808-8
3	April 24, 2021	978-4-04-064809-5
4	July 21, 2021	978-4-04-680609-3

=== Manga ===
A manga adaptation by Kino was serialized in Media Factory's Monthly Comic Alive magazine from January 27, 2021, to January 27, 2022. Two tankōbon volumes were released from May 21, 2021, to January 21, 2022.

==== Volumes ====
No.	Release date	ISBN
1	May 21, 2021	978-4-04-680594-2
2	January 21, 2022	978-4-04-680941-4

=== Anime ===
An anime television series adaptation was announced on December 4, 2020. The series was animated by ENGI and directed by Kazuya Miura, with Kenta Ihara writing the series' scripts, and Yūta Kevin Kenmotsu designing the characters. It ran from April 7 to June 23, 2021, on AT-X, Tokyo MX, SUN, KBS Kyoto, and BS11. Mayu Maeshima performed the opening theme "Answer", while Ayana Taketatsu, Fairouz Ai, Shiori Izawa, and Aoi Koga performed the ending theme "Kisuida!". It ran for 12 episodes.

Funimation licensed and streamed the series. On June 8, 2021, Funimation announced that the series would receive an English dub, which premiered the following day. Following Sony's acquisition of Crunchyroll, the series was moved to Crunchyroll.

==== Episodes ====
No.	Title (Note: All English titles are taken from Funimation.)	Directed by	Written by	Storyboarded by	Original release date
1	"VR⨯Reality"; Transliteration: "Bui Āru×Riaru" (Japanese: ＶＲ×リアル)	Shin'ichi Fukumoto	Kenta Ihara	Kazuya Miura	April 7, 2021
In Japan, VRMMORPGs reach new levels of sophistication where players experience the game with all their five senses and NPCs react like real humans. Hiroshi Yuki realizes he does not have enough money to buy Finalizing Quest XXII, the latest installment in the series, so he goes to a smaller store to try and find it cheaper. The manager, Reona Kisaragi, tricks him into buying a ten-year-old game titled Kiwame Quest, pointing out its higher than normal rating. Entering the game as his character, Hiro, he is impressed with how realistic the world seems. His first quest is to leave the beginner city of Ted and find Flora Castle, but his childhood friend NPCs, Alicia and her brother Martin, inform him leaving the city is illegal and try to stop him. Annoyed when Martin punches him and he actually feels the pain, Hiro accidentally kills Martin. When Alicia goes mad, he flees into the city where he meets Reona in character as a fairy. She is shocked to find he has already ruined his chances of becoming the Hero by earning the title "Best Friend Killer".
2	"Living in a Dead Game"; Transliteration: "Kasogē no Jūnin" (Japanese: 過疎ゲーの住人)	Yoshitsugu Kimura	Kenta Ihara	Royden B	April 14, 2021
Reona explains the game was designed to be totally realistic, so there is no restarting from the beginning. Reona suggests Hiro get help from Ginji, a player who also killed his best friend NPC, Enrique. Hiro realizes being a murderer has gameplay disadvantages. Alicia reappears and Reona explains Alicia is a skilled knife user and most players make her a permanent teammate, but having killed Martin, this option is unavailable. Reona, who is invisible to NPCs, attacks Alicia's eyes, allowing Hiro to log out. At school, Hiro's friend Takafumi advises him that his bullies might leave him alone if he stops playing games. Logging back in, Hiro finds Ginji, a middle-aged drunk, who reveals he killed his best friends, not realizing his actions were irreversible, and after ten years of gameplay, he still has not won. As their characters are based on their real bodies, he advises Hiro to learn martial arts in real life. He also tells him about the one player who won the game named Kamui. Then, claiming it will help, Ginji removes Hiro's disguise and exposes him as the wanted murderer.
3	"Adult Event Time"; Transliteration: "Otona no Ibento Taimu" (Japanese: 大人のイベントタイム)	Fumio Maezono	Kenta Ihara	Fumio Maezono	April 21, 2021
Ginji advises Hiro to never admit he killed Martin or he will have to serve an actual prison sentence. In prison, Martin's ghost appears and decides to haunt Hiro until he remembers their childhood promise, which Hiro has no memory of. Hiro realizes Ginji is similarly haunted by his best friends. Hiro is then retrieved by a girl named Mizarisa. The game warns him he is about to experience "Intense Stimulation" and he gives consent, thinking he and Mizarisa are going to have sex, only to realize she is actually the town inquisitor. She explains if he confesses, he goes to prison, but if he endures torture, he will be freed. Reona finally appears, explaining if he does not want to be treated as a murderer for the entire game, he must endure the torture. Mizarisa prepares to cut off his legs and arms, but the torture is suddenly stopped. Examining Hiro's title, Reona realizes that having wet his pants in fear, Hiro accidentally unlocked a previously unknown skill and storyline that avoids the torture. While Reona is ecstatic, Hiro furiously quits the game and swears to never play again.
4	"The Only One to Beat the Game"; Transliteration: "Tada Hitori no Kōryakusha" (Japanese: ただ一人の攻略者)	Takashi Andō	Kenta Ihara	Hidetoshi Yoshida	April 28, 2021
Hiro remembers how he tripped and accidentally wet himself during his first race in high school. Mike McLachlan, an Olympic medalist in the audience, identified his lack of mental strength and advised him to look inward. As such, Hiro quit the track team and became the target of bullies. In the present, his sister criticizes him for quitting just because the game became difficult. After bullies take his money again, he goes to Reona's shop to return the game. However, she lets him know about Soichiro Kamui, a local politician who attributed his personal success to lessons he learned from winning the game. She then shows Hiro a walkthrough Kamui created, but no one used it because as a teenager, Kamui was unbearably rude. Hiro learns he must beat Alicia without fighting, acquire a sword, allow Martin to continue haunting him and begin acquiring items as shops in the game can and will run out of necessary items. Reona convinces Hiro to continue playing by promising to marry him if he beats the game. Logging back in, Hiro decides to play the unknown storyline while Mizarisa decides Hiro is her favorite victim ever and hopes to torture him again.
5	"The Tribulation of a Killer"; Transliteration: "Satsujinki no Kunō" (Japanese: 殺人鬼の苦悩)	Tatsuya Sasaki	Kenta Ihara	Toshihiko Masuda	May 5, 2021
Tesla, Captain of the City Guard, explains he is declaring Martin's death an unfortunate accident, so Hiro is set free. Unfortunately, due to the realism, Alicia still wants revenge and the villagers still believe he is guilty. Needing money to acquire necessary items, Hiro asks Ginji for a loan. When Ginji refuses, Hiro loses his temper. Martin's ghost then appears, reminding Hiro what happened the last time he was enraged. The ghosts of Ginji's childhood friends also appear to speak to him, though Hiro cannot see or hear them. Reona convinces Ginji the fight was a duel, so he hands over his gold and Hiro's title unfortunately changes. Deciding he needs smoke bombs to defend against Alicia, Hiro goes to an item shop run by Melissa, only to find he is still being charged inflated prices. He attempts to retrieve the sword he should have started the game with, but finds Alicia waiting. Attempting to use a smoke bomb, Hiro forgets that due to the realism, he actually needs to light the fuse first. Alicia tries to kill him but he is saved by Mizarisa, who refuses to let Alicia kill her favorite victim.
6	"Knife vs. Saw"; Transliteration: "Naifu to Nokogiri" (Japanese: ナイフとノコギリ)	Fumio Itō	Kenta Ihara	Fumio Itō	May 12, 2021
Alicia proves to be more skilled than expected and knocks Mizarisa unconscious. Remembering he is supposed to defeat Alicia without fighting, Hiro gropes her breasts, but due to the realism, she reacts like a real woman and grows angrier. Martin's ghost appears to assist Alicia in killing him so Hiro blurts out a love confession. As his childhood friend, Alicia reveals she is conflicted and runs away. Hiro realizes Alicia is unaware she is a game character and actually believes he is her beloved childhood friend, and while Martin's death was an accident, he ran like a coward rather than grieve with her. Realizing the point of Kamui's walkthrough, Hiro asks Martin to continue haunting him, which unlocks one of his character's childhood memories. Learning the childhood promise was that he and Martin would stay friends forever, Martin forgives Hiro and moves on to the afterlife. When Hiro's title changes to something slightly better, Reona believes he might once again have the opportunity to become the Hero, starting with getting his rusty sword repaired. They then notice the city is on fire, which Reona has never seen happen before.
7	"Chance of Survival 0.1%"; Transliteration: "Seizon Kakuritsu Rei Ten Ichi Pāsento" (Japanese: 生存確率０.１％)	Yuki Kanezawa	Kenta Ihara	Toshihiko Masuda	May 19, 2021
Hiro learns from the blacksmith that goblins are attacking. Reona warns Hiro goblins are ridiculously powerful and if he dies, his game console will be irreversibly shut down as a realism penalty. When Hiro asks if any players have defeated a goblin before, Reona reveals Kamui and SHOW HEY have, the latter being a boxing champion named Shouhei Aida who publicly admitted defeating a goblin was harder than defeating a real life human opponent. Hiro has Reona distract a goblin to save a little girl NPC who resembles his sister. When the goblin almost kills her, Hiro unlocks a super speed skill based on his real life running ability and saves her. Tesla then arrives and kills the goblins, with Reona revealing he is one of the game's strongest NPCs. Hiro furiously discovers saving the girl added Lolita Complex to his title. Tesla asks him to join the City Guard as a mercenary and Hiro accepts before logging out. While watching Kamui's walkthrough later on, Hiro learns doing this is actually the worst choice to make in-game as the survival rate is only 0.1%, meaning there is a 99.9% chance Hiro's console will be destroyed if he continues playing.
8	"Enlistment and Baptism"; Transliteration: "Nyūtai to Senrei" (Japanese: 入隊と洗礼)	Yoshitsugu Kimura	Kenta Ihara	Royden B	May 26, 2021
Hiro learns that having kept the childhood promise and defeating Alicia without fighting, he actually has a 0.5% chance of surviving, but only if he endures Tesla's intense five days training and survives the second goblin attack. Hiro then informs Kaede he is not quitting and will be spending five days in the game. Reentering it, Tesla introduces Hiro to Queen Govern, the enthusiastic ruler of the city. Hiro later meets two mercenary recruits like himself, Granada and Palù, as well as Cathy and Bob, soldiers who help train recruits. His main trainer is Amos, the soldier who initially arrested him for Martin's murder. Hiro fails miserably against Amos and realizes, like his real body, he has no fighting ability at all, so he is ostracized. Hiro oversleeps and is late to his second day, so Amos has him practice alone. Granada and Palù bully Hiro for being a friend killer and weak soldier, but Cathy offers to train with him and show him the basics. On the third day, Hiro is beaten in a duel by Granada, who along with Palù continues to mock him. Hiro realizes they are exactly like his real life bullies.
9	"A Fairy's Power"; Transliteration: "Yōsei no Chikara" (Japanese: 妖精の力)	Naoki Murata	Kenta Ihara	Ten Ōguro	June 2, 2021
Reona takes Hiro to the City Guard's counselor for depression, but the counselor criticizes Hiro for his lack of combat skills. Cathy suggests Hiro pray for guidance, but all that happens is a nun douses him with holy water. On day four, Palù viciously beats him and warns Cathy if she is Hiro's friend, he and Granada will beat her too, so Cathy rejects Hiro. The next day, Granada is pranked so badly he quits. Tesla later arrives with a letter supposedly from Palù, claiming Amos was responsible for the pranks. Tesla demands to know what has been happening and Cathy reveals the bullying Hiro suffered and how Amos, the recruits, and herself did nothing to stop it. As a result, Tesla fires Amos while Cathy and the recruits apologize to Hiro. That night, Reona reveals to Hiro the pranks were her doing, which causes his title to change as though it was his fault. Despite the disastrous training, Hiro decides to fight the second goblin assault, even if it destroys his console. For his bravery, Reona decides to reveal the true reason she wants him to keep playing.
10	"A New Ally"; Transliteration: "Arata na Nakama" (Japanese: 新たな仲間)	Yūki Morita	Kenta Ihara	Hidetoshi Yoshida	June 9, 2021
Reona reveals Kamui once rejected her in-game because her breasts were too big, so she swore to marry the next person who completed the game. Logging out, Hiro finds Kaede is increasingly worried about him. Checking the walkthrough, Kamui tells Hiro to stop relying on it and just fight. Tesla announces he has replaced Granada and Palù with Mizarisa and Alicia and orders them to patrol the evacuated city with Hiro. Alicia and Mizarisa apprehend a thief who admits a crime boss ordered the thieves to steal as much as possible before the goblins arrive. Infiltrating the thieves headquarters, they find the boss is Ginji. Annoyed at Ginji's selfishness, Hiro insists on fighting him alone, only for Alicia to defeat Ginji to save time. Ginji is impressed with Alicia and slightly regrets having killed both his childhood friends, but is happy to go to prison as prison cells are exempt from being attacked. The goblins attack and despite having already gone the bathroom, Hiro has to go again. While he is in the bathroom, an unprepared Hiro is confronted by a goblin.
11	"City of Dead Ends"; Transliteration: "Ikidomari no Machi" (Japanese: 行き止まりの町)	Fumio Itō	Kenta Ihara	Hiroshi Kugimiya	June 16, 2021
Mizarisa decapitates the goblin and offers to seduce Hiro. Alicia interrupting them allows Hiro to escape, but he has to use the bathroom yet again. Reona asks about his past so he explains what happened. Reona teases him about it, angering him, which stops his stomach ache but changes his title to reflect his bathroom habits. When the goblin king One-Eye invades Queen Govern's palace, Hiro suspects he is the reason the mission has a 0.1% survival rate. Tesla brings in three captured goblins to distract One-Eye. Based on several clues, Hiro realizes they have been abducted for a long time. When Tesla kills One-Eye, he admits he captured the goblins seven years ago and One-Eye was their father. Govern then arrives and they reveal goblins are actually intelligent and peaceful, but fearsome when enraged. As such, they used that to their advantage to terrify people from leaving and entering Ted, thus allowing them to rule the city completely unchallenged. Tesla kills his men to hide the truth, which causes Hiro to realize Tesla is the true final boss he must defeat.
12	"Reality⨯VR"; Transliteration: "Riaru×Bui Āru" (Japanese: リアル×ＶＲ)	Yoshitsugu Kimura	Kenta Ihara	Royden B	June 23, 2021
Alicia defends Hiro, having decided to forgive him, and is killed. Hiro then manages to use his speed skill to defend against Tesla. It is revealed via Kamui's walkthrough that the player's strong emotions temporarily negate realism. Hiro outmaneuvers and stabs Tesla, only for his sword to snap. Just as Tesla prepares to strike, Hiro's soul goes to meet Martin, who offers to give Hiro a hand. Hiro returns to finds his broken sword has become a cursed best friend killer blade. Hiro prepares to kill Tesla, only to wake up in his room having forgotten about Govern, who bumped him from behind, allowing Tesla to kill him and destroy his console. Depressed, Hiro notices a new section of Kamui's walkthrough which informs him of a way of resuming the game an hour prior to his death. Hiro decides to spend an entire month preparing and begins exercising, lifting himself out of his depression, becomes closer to his sister, and even inadvertently stands up to his bullies. Hiro realizes the same thing happened to Kamui, which gives him hope. A month later, Reona loans Hiro a new console and he reenters the game.

== See also ==
- Cautious Hero: The Hero Is Overpowered but Overly Cautious, another light novel series by the same author
