= Anthony Bowling =

American voice actor (born 1982)

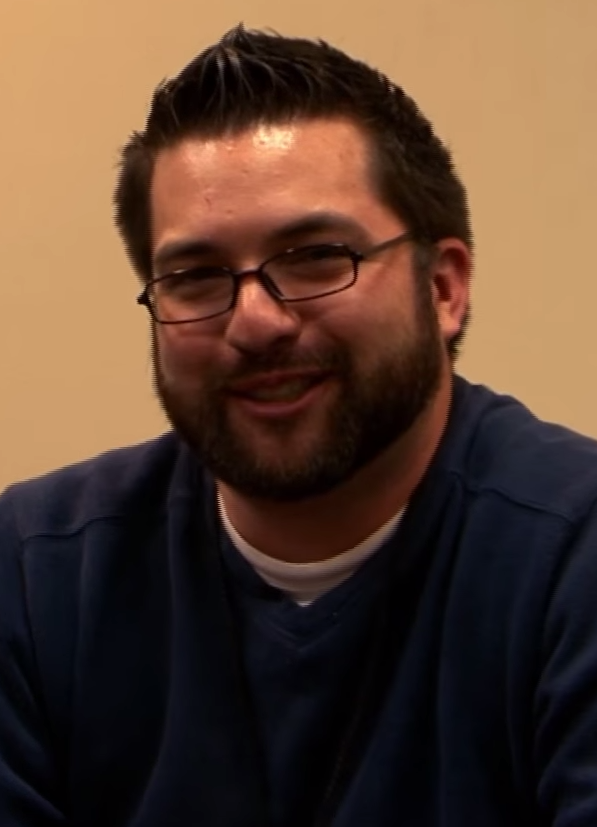
- Bowling in 2016
- Born: Anthony Wesley Bowling; December 23, 1982 (age 43); El Paso, Texas, U.S.
- Occupation: Voice actor
- Years active: 1997–present
- Spouse: Noa Gavin

Anthony Wesley Bowling (born December 23, 1982) is an American voice actor who has provided voices and directed for English-language versions of Japanese anime films and television series. As of 2026, he is best known for his role as Han Juno, one of Gazelle's close friends and computer hacker in the anime series Eureka Seven: AO. Some of his major roles include Ukyo in Samurai 7, Shiro Ashiya / Alciel in The Devil Is a Part-Timer!, Shin Fukuhara in Baka and Test, Orito in Is This a Zombie?, Aoi Torisaki in Absolute Duo, and Junichiro Kagami, the title character in Ultimate Otaku Teacher.

== Personal life ==
Bowling is married to Noa Gavin.

== Filmography ==
=== Anime ===
List of voice performances in anime
Year	Title	Role	Notes	Source
2009	Big Windup!	Shoji Suyama		
2010	Hetalia: The Beautiful World	New Zealand		
2010	Baka to Test to Shokanjuu	Shin Fukuhara		
2010	My Bride Is a Mermaid	Hideyoshi "Chimp" Sarutobi		
2011–2019	Fairy Tail	Yuka Suzuki		
2012	Is This a Zombie? series	Orito		
2013–present	The Devil Is a Part-Timer!	Shiro Ashiya / Alciel	Also season 2	
2013	Eureka Seven AO	Han Juno		
2013	Toriko	Gido		
2014	Red Data Girl	Shibata		
2015	Ultimate Otaku Teacher	Junichiro Kagami		
2015	Ping Pong the Animation	Manabu Sakuma / Demon		
2015	Absolute Duo	Aoi "Tora" Torasaki		
2016–2018	Ace Attorney	Gregory Edgeworth, Additional Voices	Five episodes	
2016	Maken-ki!	Kengo Usui	Season 2, replaced Scott Freeman	
2016	Zankyou no Terror	Kinoshita		
2017	Tsuredure Children	Takuro Sugawara		
2017	The Saga of Tanya the Evil	Isaac Dustin Drake		
2018	Dragon Ball Super	Ag, Roselle		
2018–2024	My Hero Academia	Hiryu Rin/Dragon Shround, Hari Kurono/Chronostasis, Tomoyasu Chikazoku/Skeptic (Seasons 6–7)		
2019	Dragon Ball Super: Broly	Beets		
2019	Isekai Quartet	Vanir		
2019	Nichijou	Sakamoto		
2019	One Piece: Stampede	Donald Moderate		
2019	Cautious Hero: The Hero Is Overpowered but Overly Cautious	Seiya Ryuuguuin		
2020	Bofuri: I Don't Want to Get Hurt, so I'll Max Out My Defense	Kuromu		
2020	Our Last Crusade or the Rise of a New World		ADR Director	
2020	By the Grace of the Gods	Reinhart Jamil		
2021	Ikebukuro West Gate Park	Zero-One		
2022–present	Spy × Family	Franky Franklin		
2022	Estab Life: Great Escape	Alga		
2022	Heroines Run the Show	Kodai		
2022	I'm the Villainess, So I'm Taming the Final Boss	Almond		
2022	PuraOre! Pride of Orange	Takahito Suzuki		
2023	One Piece	Kawamatsu		
2023	The Great Cleric	Monster Luck		
2024	The Wrong Way to Use Healing Magic	Gomul		
2024	Cherry Magic! Thirty Years of Virginity Can Make You a Wizard?!	Company Director		
2024	I'll Become a Villainess Who Goes Down in History	Arnold Williams		
2025	Zenshu	Veteran Episode Director		
2025	Solo Leveling: Arise from the Shadow	Hyun Kichul		
2025	Honey Lemon Soda	Mizoguchi		

=== Films ===
Year	Title	Role	Notes	Source
2021	Josee, the Tiger and the Fish	Yukichi		
2024	Spy × Family Code: White	Franky Franklin		
