= Mayu Maeshima =

Mayu Maeshima 前島 麻由
- Born: April 14, 1993 (age 33); Tokyo, Japan
- Genres: Anison; rock; J-pop
- Occupation: Singer
- Years active: 2013–present
- Labels: Warner Music Japan (2019); KADOKAWA (2021–present)
- Formerly of: Ms. Velonica; MYTH & ROID
- Website: mayumaeshima.com

Mayu Maeshima (前島 麻由, Maeshima Mayu; born April 14, 1993) is a Japanese singer from Tokyo who is affiliated with Newcome. Beginning her music activities as an independent recording artist, she was the lead vocalist of the pop rock band MYTH & ROID from 2015 to 2017. After leaving MYTH & ROID, she resumed activities as a solo artist, making her major debut in 2019. Her music has been featured in anime series such as Re:Zero − Starting Life in Another World, Full Dive, Overlord and Uncle from Another World.

== Career ==
Maeshima's music activities began as a member of the band Ms. Velonica, which was active from 2012 until 2013. In 2015, she became a member of the music unit MYTH & ROID, serving as its lead vocalist until November 2017. In 2019, she released the digital single "YELLOW" under Warner Music Japan. This was followed by the release of her first solo album From Dream And You in September 2019. Her first solo single "Long shot" was released on February 24, 2021, under KADOKAWA; the title song was used as the second opening theme to the second season of the anime series Re:Zero − Starting Life in Another World, while the coupling track "Reline" was used as the main theme to the game Re:Zero: The Prophecy of the Throne. Her second single "ANSWER" was released on May 26, 2021; the title song was used as the opening theme to the anime series Full Dive: This Ultimate Next-Gen Full Dive RPG Is Even Shittier than Real Life!. Her third single "No Man's Dawn" was released on July 27, 2022; the title song was used as the ending theme to the fourth season of the anime series Overlord. Her fourth single "story" was released on August 3, 2022; the title song was used as the opening theme to the anime series Uncle from Another World. Her songs "Ruler" and "Foreshadow" were used as the opening themes to the first and second season of the anime series Clevatess in 2025 and 2026.

== Discography ==
=== Album ===
Title	Album details	Peak chart positions		Sales
Title	Album details	JPN	JPN Hot	Sales
From Dream And You	Released: September 25, 2019; Label: Warner Music Japan; Formats: CD, digital download, streaming	102	—	
"—" denotes releases that did not chart.

=== Singles ===
Title	Year	Peak chart positions		Sales	Album
Title	Year	JPN	JPN Hot	Sales	Album
"Long shot"	2021	61	— (Note: "Long shot" did not enter the Japan Hot 100 but peaked at number 17 on Download Songs chart.)		Non-album singles
"Answer"	2021	80	—		Non-album singles
"No Man's Dawn"	2022	64	— (Note: "No Man's Dawn" did not enter the Japan Hot 100 but peaked at number 15 on Download Songs chart.)	JPN: 748 (phy.); JPN: 10,713 (dig.)	Non-album singles
"Story"	2022	52	— (Note: "Story" did not enter the Japan Hot 100 but peaked at number 10 on Download Songs chart.)	JPN: 1,045 (phy.); JPN: 15,551 (dig.)	Non-album singles
"—" denotes releases that did not chart.

==== Digital singles ====
Title	Year	Peak chart positions		Sales (digital)	Album
Title	Year	JPN DS	JPN DL	Sales (digital)	Album
"Yellow"	2019	—	—		From Dream And You
"Everything is Changing"	2023	—	—		Non-album singles
"Love or Hate?"	2024	47	61	JPN: 3,139	Non-album singles
"The Ban"	2024	—	—		Non-album singles
"Sayonara, subarashiki sekaiyo" (さよなら、素晴らしき世界よ)	2024	—	—		Non-album singles
"True Peak"	2025	—	—		Non-album singles
"Ruler"	2025	—	—		Non-album singles
"Melting days"	2025	—	—		Non-album singles
"Beautiful"	2026	—	—		Non-album singles
"Foreshadow"	2026	—	—		Non-album singles
"—" denotes releases that did not chart.
