= Myth & Roid =

Japanese pop rock band

- Origin: Japan
- Genres: J-pop; Anison; pop rock; electronic rock
- Years active: 2015 – present
- Labels: Media Factory (2015–2020); TaWaRa Creative (2020–2021); Kadokawa (2022 – present)
- Members: Tom-H@ck hotaru Kihow
- Past members: Mayu Maeshima (2015–2017)
- Website: mythandroid.com

YouTube information
- Channel: Myth & Roid Official Channel
- Years active: 2020–present
- Genre: Music
- Subscribers: 179 thousand
- Views: 185.1 million
- Last updated: October 14, 2026

Myth & Roid (stylized in all caps) is a Japanese pop rock band centered around Tom-H@ck (guitar, composer, production) and hotaru (lyrics, story planning), featuring multiple vocalists. The band made its debut in 2015 with the release of its first single "L.L.L". The band's music has been featured in various anime series, mostly of the isekai genre such as Re:Zero, Isekai Quartet (Note: The Isekai Quartet franchise consists of Overlord, Re:Zero − Starting Life in Another World, KonoSuba and Saga of Tanya the Evil.), Boogiepop and Others, BBK/BRNK, Cautious Hero: The Hero Is Overpowered but Overly Cautious, Made in Abyss, Isekai Cheat Magician, Overlord, and Arknights: Perish in Frost.

== History ==
According to the band's official website, its name comes from two words: "myth" representing the past, and "android" representing the future; the band hopes that these two aspects will allow the creation of "a new world".

The band debuted with Mayu Maeshima on vocals in 2015, with the release of its first single "L.L.L" (Leashed Luminous Love); the ending theme to the 2015 anime television series Overlord. The single peaked at No. 29 on the Oricon weekly charts, and reached a ranking of No. 3 on iTunes' Japanese download rankings.

The band's second single "Anger/Anger" was released on February 24, 2016; the title track is used as the ending theme to the 2016 anime television series BBK/BRNK. The single peaked at No. 82 on the Oricon weekly charts. The band's third single "Styx Helix" was released on May 25, 2016; the title song is used as the first ending theme to the 2016 anime television series Re:Zero − Starting Life in Another World, and the coupling song "Straight Bet" is used as the ending theme for episode 7. The band's fourth single "Paradisus-Paradoxum" was released on August 24, 2016; the title track is used as the second opening theme to Re:Zero -Starting Life in Another World-, and the coupling song "theater D" is used as the ending theme for episode 14. The unit's fifth single "Jingo Jungle" was released on February 8, 2017; the single's title track is used as the opening theme to the 2017 anime television series The Saga of Tanya the Evil. The band also performed theme songs for two Overlord theatrical movies released in 2017.

In 2017, Kihow joined the band after being discovered by Tom-H@ck. Having lived overseas in the past, she is capable of singing in both English and Japanese. Able to freely transform her singing style, her voice is known as the "rainbow-colored voice".

On April 24, 2017, the band's first album eYe's was released.

In November 2017, it was announced that vocalist Mayu Maeshima would be "graduating" from the band in order to pursue a solo career.

On December 18, 2017, the band's sixth single "Hydra" was announced, and Kihow's face was revealed as part of the cover for the album

The band debuted Kihow on lead vocals in 2018, with the release of "Hydra", the title track is used as the ending to the 2018 anime series Overlord II.

Later in 2018 the band's seventh single "Voracity" was the opening for Overlord III.

In 2019, the band's song "shadowgraph" was used as the opening theme for the anime Boogiepop and Others. Its coupling track, "Remembrance", was featured in the first theatrical movie release of "The Saga of Tanya the Evil". The band's song "Panta Rhei" was used as the opening theme for the anime Isekai Cheat Magician while their song "Tit for Tat" was used as the opening theme for the anime Cautious Hero: The Hero Is Overpowered but Overly Cautious.

In December 2019, it was announced that the band's best of album Museum: The Best of Myth & Roid would be released on March 4, 2020. The song "Forever Lost" was included as new song and used as the ending theme to the film Made in Abyss: Dawn of the Deep Soul while "Cracked Black" was also included in the album and used for the Overlord mobile game "Mass for the Dead"'s first anniversary theme song.

In October 2020, it was announced that their 2 songs "Future is Mine" and "Reminiscence Reincarnation", respectively used as "Shin Kaku Gi Kou and The Eleven Destroyers" and "Eternal City" mobile games theme songs, would be finally released on their first digital album Future Is Mine under their independent label "TaWaRa Creative" where both Tom-H@ck and hotaru work. The album was released on October 28, 2020. This was their first digital worldwide release.

In March 2021, they announced a collaboration song with Honkai Impact 3rd to celebrate the 3rd anniversary of the global version. The preview of the new song "Brilliant Bright" was shown on the anniversary special video by miHoYo, uploaded on Honkai Impact 3rd official YouTube Channel, featuring various female characters from the game with a bunny dress. The full song was pre-released on March 31, 2021, on the official full MV by miHoYo.

"Brilliant Bright" was released worldwide on April 7, 2021, on streaming platforms.

In May 2021, Kihow announced that she was in charge of the theme songs of a new Japanese Theatrical Drama called "Boiled, Shrimp & Crab". The opening and ending songs were released as a digital single, produced by MOS, under TaWaRa Creative.

In July 2021, Kihow participated in an album called "Wacompi" as guest vocalist, released by Grater Records. The album is a compilation of songs by virtual and real artists. She performed "Narcosis".

In August 2021, Kihow collaborated with Touhou LostWord mobile game. She was featured in a vocalized version of one of the most popular OST from the game "U.N Owen Was Her?" called "I'm Alright!"

In October 2021, Kihow announced that she would debut as a solo singer with a new artist photo, though she would remain a Myth & Roid vocalist. On November 8, 2021, her first digital single glitter was released.

In November 2021, Kihow and Mili's vocalist Cassie announced a collaboration song, produced by Mili, for Limbus Company by Project Moon. On December 21, 2021, "In Hell We Live, Lament" by Mili feat. Kihow was released worldwide on streaming platforms as a digital single.

In January 2022, Kihow announced a collaboration song with Touhou Danmaku Kagura called "Don't Unravel". She was a secret guest of the live stream for the half year anniversary of the game. She also performed the song. It was included in the game on February 4.

In March 2022, Kihow announced a collaboration song with Artiswitch for its MV series. "Paint" was released as her second digital single on April 15.

In May 2022, it was announced that the band would perform the ending theme for the second season of the anime series, Made in Abyss: Retsujitsu no Ōgonkyō (Made in Abyss: The Golden City of the Scorching Sun), titled "Endless Embrace". The song was released as their eleventh single on August 24, 2022.

In August 2023, it was announced that the band's first mini album would be released in two parts. Azul <Episode 1> was released for October 25, 2023, while Verde <Episode 2> was released on March 27, 2024. The song "Ache in Pulse" was included in <Episode 1> as new song and used as the opening theme to the anime series Arknights: Perish in Frost.

In October 2024, the single "Nox Lux" was used as the ending theme for the third season of Re:Zero − Starting Life in Another World.

== Discography ==
=== Albums ===
==== Studio albums ====
| Title | Album details | Peak chart positions | | Sales |
| Title | Album details | JPN | JPN Hot | Sales |
|---|---|---|---|---|
| eYe's | Released: April 26, 2017; Label: Kadokawa; Formats: CD, Blu-ray, digital download, streaming | 6 | 6 | JPN: 8,839 |

==== Compilation albums ====
| Title | Album details | Peak chart positions | | Sales |
| Title | Album details | JPN | JPN Hot | Sales |
|---|---|---|---|---|
| Museum–The Best of Myth & Roid– | Released: March 4, 2020; Label: Kadokawa; Formats: CD, Blu-ray, digital download, streaming | 10 | 8 | JPN: 10,701 |

==== Extended plays ====
| Title | Album details | Peak chart positions | | Sales |
| Title | Album details | JPN | JPN Hot | Sales |
|---|---|---|---|---|
| Future is Mine | Released: October 28, 2020; Label: TaWaRa Creative; Formats: Digital download, streaming | N/A | — | |
| Azul〈Episode 1〉 | Released: October 25, 2023; Label: Kadokawa; Formats: CD, digital download, streaming | 139 | 83 | JPN: 143 (dig.) |
| Verde〈Episode 2〉 | Released: March 27, 2024; Label: Kadokawa; Formats: CD, digital download, streaming | 181 | — | |
"—" denotes releases that did not chart.

=== Singles ===
| Title | Year | Peak chart positions | | Sales | Album |
| Title | Year | JPN | JPN Hot | Sales | Album |
|---|---|---|---|---|---|
| "L.L.L" | 2015 | 29 | 21 | JPN: 3,774 | eYe's |
| "Anger/Anger" | 2016 | 82 | — | JPN: 812 | eYe's |
| "Styx Helix" | 2016 | 26 | 12 | JPN: 4,696 | eYe's |
| "Paradisus-Paradoxum" | 2016 | 24 | 12 | JPN: 5,582 | eYe's |
| "Jingo Jungle" | 2017 | 22 | 11 | JPN: 4,831 | eYe's |
| "Hydra" | 2018 | 33 | 18 | JPN: 1,912 | Museum–The Best of Myth & Roid– |
| "Voracity" | 2018 | 47 | 22 | JPN: 1,874 | Museum–The Best of Myth & Roid– |
| "Shadowgraph" | 2019 | 40 | 35 | JPN: 1,828 | Museum–The Best of Myth & Roid– |
| "Panta Rhei" | 2019 | 80 | — (Note: "Panta Rhei" did not enter the Japan Hot 100 but peaked at number 42 on Download Songs chart.) | | Museum–The Best of Myth & Roid– |
| "Tit for Tat" | 2019 | 90 | — (Note: "Tit for Tat" did not enter the Japan Hot 100 but peaked at number 32 on Download Songs chart.) | | Museum–The Best of Myth & Roid– |
| "Endless Embrace" | 2022 | 50 | — (Note: "Endless Embrace" did not enter the Japan Hot 100 but peaked at number 11 on Download Songs chart.) | JPN: 941 (phy.); JPN: 4,971 (dig.) | Non-album single |
"—" denotes releases that did not chart.

==== Digital singles ====
| Title | Year | Peak chart positions | | Sales (digital) | Album |
| Title | Year | JPN Dig. | JPN DL | Sales (digital) | Album |
|---|---|---|---|---|---|
| "Brilliant Bright" | 2021 | — | — | | Non-album singles |
| "Nox Lux" | 2024 | 24 | 23 | JPN: 3,963 | Non-album singles |
| "Nox Lux (English Version)" | 2024 | — | — | | Non-album singles |
| "Ender Ember" (feat. TK from Ling Tosite Sigure) | 2026 | 19 | 18 | JPN: 2,692 | Non-album singles |
| "Why? Red induction" | 2026 | 20 | 17 | JPN: 5,323 | Non-album singles |
| "Awake Anew" | 2026 | — | — | | Non-album singles |
| "True-Taboo" | 2027 | TBA | | | Non-album singles |
"—" denotes releases that did not chart.
