= The Saga of Tanya the Evil =

Japanese novel series and its adaptations

- First light novel volume cover, featuring Tanya von Degurechaff

幼女戦記 (Yōjo Senki)
- Genre: Dark fantasy; Isekai; Military
- Novel series
- Written by: Carlo Zen
- Published by: Arcadia
- Original run: 2010 – 2017
- Light novel
- Written by: Carlo Zen
- Illustrated by: Shinobu Shinotsuki
- Published by: Enterbrain
- English publisher: NA: Yen Press
- Original run: October 31, 2013 – present
- Volumes: 14
- Manga
- Written by: Carlo Zen
- Illustrated by: Chika Tōjō
- Published by: Kadokawa Shoten
- English publisher: NA: Yen Press
- Magazine: Comp Ace
- Original run: April 26, 2016 – present
- Volumes: 35
- Anime television series

Saga of Tanya the Evil
- Directed by: Yutaka Uemura (S1); Takayuki Yamamoto (S2)
- Produced by: Shō Tanaka; Norifumi Kikujima; Takuya Tsunoki; Noritomo Isogai; Keisuke Arai
- Written by: Kenta Ihara
- Music by: Shūji Katayama
- Studio: NUT
- Licensed by: Crunchyroll (Note: Formerly known as Funimation): SA/SEA: Medialink
- Original network: AT-X, Tokyo MX, SUN, KBS, TVA, BS11
- Original run: January 6, 2017 – September 23, 2026
- Episodes: 24 + SP
- Anime film
- Saga of Tanya the Evil: The Movie
- icon

The Saga of Tanya the Evil, (Note: The starting "The" is occasionally omitted, especially when referring to the anime adaptation.) known in Japan as Yōjo Senki (幼女戦記; lit. 'The Military Chronicles of a Little Girl'), is a Japanese light novel series written by Carlo Zen and illustrated by Shinobu Shinotsuki. It began serialization online in 2010, on the user-generated novel publishing website Arcadia. Enterbrain acquired the series in October 2013 and has published fourteen volumes by September 2023. A manga adaptation with art by Chika Tōjō began serialization in Kadokawa Shoten's Comp Ace magazine from April 2016.

The series focuses on a salaryman whose reincarnation as the titular character living in an alternate version of a great European war leaves her struggling to avoid an untimely death while on the front lines of one of the largest conflicts in human history. Tanya must take upon herself a bloodthirsty, sadist ego in hopes of joining the ranks of the Empire's Mage Corps as part of her plan to become a seemingly indestructible foe.

An anime television series adaptation by NUT was broadcast in Japan from January to March 2017. Saga of Tanya the Evil: The Movie, a theatrical film taking place after the events of the anime series, was released in Japan in February 2019. A second season aired from July to September 2026.

== Plot ==
In 2013 of modern-era Tokyo, an unnamed atheist Japanese salaryman, in the moment of being murdered by a disgruntled subordinate whom he had fired due to poor performance at work, is confronted by an entity that declares itself to be God who condemns the salaryman for not having 'faith'. The salaryman disbelieves in its existence, criticises its various statements from his perspective as an atheist and mockingly terms it as 'Being X'. The entity decides to reincarnate the salaryman into a world where he would face sufficiently difficult circumstances to turn to Being X for help.

The salaryman is reborn as Tanya Degurechaff, an orphaned girl in an alternate universe's equivalent of Imperial Germany, known as the Empire, in which World War I has been delayed until the 1920s and where magic has been incorporated into the military. According to Being X, if Tanya either does not die a natural death or refuses to have faith in it, her soul will leave the cycle of reincarnation and will be sent to hell for the countless sins that Tanya has committed in her previous life. In search for an escape, Tanya decides to join the Empire's Mage Corps and fight in the war, hoping to reach a high enough rank as fast as possible to remain far from the battlefield, and in this way avoid the risk of being killed. Even if she's now forced to speak with a young girl's lips, Tanya soon turns into a ruthless soldier who prioritizes efficiency and her own career over anything else, even the lives of those beneath her, especially those that get on her bad side.

== Characters ==
=== Empire ===
Tanya Degurechaff (later Tanya von Degurechaff) (ターニャ・フォン・デグレチャフ, Tānya Degurechafu (Tānya fon Degurechafu))
Voiced by: Aoi Yūki (Tanya), Kōsuke Toriumi (salaryman) (Japanese); Monica Rial (Tanya), Jessie James Grelle (salaryman) (English)
Tanya is a young blonde, blue-eyed girl who is the reincarnation of a cold-hearted, atheistic, and social-darwinistic Japanese salaryman. She is a mage with magical powers that enable her to fly and fire explosive bullets from guns. Compared to others, Tanya has a high latent magical ability and is the only one capable of using an experimental Type-95 operation orb due to Being X's interference. She controls a battalion of elite mages whose main purpose is to overwhelm enemy forces while also remaining highly mobile and relatively small. Tanya is quite ruthless and intolerant of failings in others, much the same as in her previous life, and employs several extreme punishments and training methods. After she graduated from War College as one of the Twelve Knights, she was granted the title of von. By the end of the TV series her rank is major. At the end of the movie, she finally gets her dream job working with an office job in the rear for 2 months with a promotion to lieutenant colonel, much to her joy and triumphs against her hated enemy, Being X. But that joy was short-lived when she received a phone call from General Zettour, who informed her that he had put her proposal, titled "Unit Usage and Operational Maneuvers in the Current War" to use and organized a Kampfgruppe codenamed "Salamander", which consisted of infantry, armor, and artillery, gave her command of the special army and wanted to see her research in action by having her and the 203rd mage battalion return to the front lines once more, much to her shock and horror.
Viktoriya Ivanovna "Visha" Serebryakov (Виктория Ивановна "Виша" Серебряков) (ヴィクトーリヤ・イヴァーノヴナ・セレブリャコーフ (ヴィーシャ), Vīkutōriya Ivuānovuna "Vīsha" Sereburyakōfu)
Voiced by: Saori Hayami (Japanese); Jeannie Tirado (English)
Viktoriya is a Second Lieutenant in the Imperial Army and serves under Tanya Degurechaff, and later becomes her adjutant. Different from other characters from the Empire, Viktoriya is a refugee from the Revolution of the Rus' Union and her family was originally a member of the Rus aristocracy. Having served under Tanya during the Battle of the Rhine, Viktoriya is more familiar with Tanya's true personality, to which she shows fear, but also respect. As a result of knowing Tanya, Viktoriya is more able to keep up with Tanya compared to her other soldiers. However, despite knowing Tanya's side character, Viktoriya seems to believe that Tanya actually cares for her subordinates and her harsh treatment of them, is to ultimately ensure their survival. In the manga, Viktoriya's "particular" point of view of Tanya's character, seems to have started when Viktoriya, during her first true battle, is saved by Tanya at the last second, who (to hide her enjoyment in killing the enemy soldiers) quoted General Robert E. Lee, saying to Viktoriya "It is well that war is so horrible, otherwise men would grow fond of it", starting the misunderstanding. Tanya is also shown to perceive Viktoriya as identical in appearance to their former secretary in 2013 Japan; whether or not Viktoriya is the reincarnation of Tanya's secretary has not been confirmed.
Erich Rerugen (later von Rerugen) (エーリッヒ・フォン・レルゲン, Ērihhi Rerugen (Ērihhi fon Rerugen) / Erich von Lehrgen
Voiced by: Shin-ichiro Miki (Japanese); J. Michael Tatum (English)
Erich is a Lieutenant Colonel in the Imperial Army and has known Tanya since she joined the military. He has seen Tanya's true nature during her time in training, and views her as a monster in a little girl's form.
His last name is spelled "Lergen" in English light novel translation.
Kurt von Rudersdorf (クルト・フォン・ルーデルドルフ, Kuruto fon Rūderudorufu)
Voiced by: Tesshō Genda (Japanese); Greg Dulcie (English)
He is the Deputy Chief of Operations in the Imperial General Staff Office.
Hans von Zettour (ハンス・フォン・ゼートゥーア, Hansu fon Zētūa)
Voiced by: Hōchū Ōtsuka (Japanese); Mark Stoddard (season 1), Jason Douglas (season 2) (English)
He is the Deputy Chief of Logistics in the Imperial General Staff Office.
Matheus Johann Weiss/Matheus Johann Weiß (ヴァイス)
Voiced by: Daiki Hamano (Japanese); Daman Mills (English)
Vooren Grantz (グランツ)
Voiced by: Yūsuke Kobayashi (Japanese); Jeff Johnson (English)

=== Legadonia ===
Anson Sue/Sioux (アンソン・スー, Anson Sū)
Voiced by: Kenyuu Horiuchi (Japanese); Jarrod Greene (English)
He is the commander of the 5th Aerial Mage Wing. He has a daughter called Mary Sue. He is later promoted to the grade of Colonel after the death of his superior officer. In the anime, he is believed to have been killed in battle by Tanya, during the Battle of the Orse Fjord. Later it is revealed that he actually survived and had a vision of God ("Being X") who told him to kill the "Devil", granting him additional power. In order to achieve his objective, he accepted to be part of an Allied Kingdom mage special force, managing to corner Tanya and her battalion over the sea. However, though in the end, he almost succeeds in killing Tanya, even willing to blow himself up to kill her, through Viktoriya's intervention, Anson failed to kill her and eventually died in his own explosion.

=== Allied Kingdom ===
Drake (ドレイク, Doreiku)
Voiced by: Binbin Takaoka (Japanese); Anthony Bowling (English)
He is an Allied Kingdom marine mage and intelligence officer. He encounters Tanya in several instances while conducting intelligence activities in countries hostile to the Empire. He later becomes Mary Sue's superior following her enlistment in a multinational volunteer unit he takes command of and struggles to handle her frequent acts of insubordination and fits of rage during battles. In the web and light novel, he is a single character but split into multiple from the same family in the anime and manga adaptations.

=== Unified States ===
Mary Sue/Sioux (メアリー・スー, Mearī Sū)
Voiced by: Haruka Tomatsu (Japanese); Tia Ballard (English)
She is the only daughter of Anson Sue. She fled to the Unified States along with her mother prior to her father's death at the hands of Tanya. After enlisting in the military and surviving a battle against Tanya, she becomes rather more vengeful and stubborn in nature. Her hatred grows when she hears the name "Devil of the Rhine," leading her to begin to rage and expose an uncontrollable side. Granted additional power by Being X, she becomes the counterbalance of the main protagonist of the series. Her name is a direct reference to the "Mary Sue" trope.

=== Divine Realm ===
Being X/Existence X (存在X, Sonzai Ekkusu)
Voiced by: Hideaki Tezuka (Japanese); Bill Jenkins (English)
An entity that claims itself to be a god of reincarnation. After a philosophical argument with a Japanese salaryman, it reincarnates him into Tanya in hopes that he will come to believe in God. The name "Being X" is designated by Tanya who does not believe in the existence of God. It is characterized as being frustrated with the increasing faithlessness in the modern world. Occasionally, it converses with Tanya to taunt her or see if she has come to believe.

== Media ==
=== Light novels ===
The novel series is written by Carlo Zen and was initially serialized on the web novel hosting website Arcadia, before Enterbrain's acquisition. It was subsequently published as light novels with illustrations by Shinobu Shinotsuki. The first volume was released on October 31, 2013, and as of September 29, 2023, fourteen volumes have been released. A drama CD was released with the third volume. It was licensed by Yen Press.

==== Audiobooks ====
On November 16, 2021, Yen Press released an audiobook of the first light novel, read by the English voice actress for Tanya, Monica Rial. Volumes 2–6 were voiced by audiobook narrator Shiromi Arserio. Volumes 7–14 were done by Erin Rieman.

=== Manga ===
A manga adaptation illustrated by Chika Tōjō began serialization in Kadokawa Shoten's Comp Ace magazine on April 26, 2016. Kadokawa released the first volume on December 10, 2016. As of August 25, 2026, 35 volumes have been released.

=== Anime ===
An anime television series adaptation by NUT aired from January 6 to March 31, 2017. Crunchyroll and Funimation has licensed the series in North America. The opening theme is "Jingo Jungle" by Myth & Roid and the ending theme is "Los! Los! Los!" by Aoi Yūki as Tanya Degurechaff. A chibi parody short OVA produced by Studio Puyukai, titled Youjo Shenki, premiered in January 2017.

On June 19, 2021, a second season was announced. The main cast and staff are returning to reprise their roles, with Takayuki Yamamoto replacing Uemura as director. It aired from July 8 to September 23, 2026. The opening theme is "Why? RED induction" by Myth & Roid and the ending theme is "Weiter! Weiter!" by Aoi Yūki as Tanya Degurechaff.

A comedy crossover anime, Isekai Quartet featured characters from The Saga of Tanya the Evil in a Chibi style, much like the OVA. It also featured characters from the light novel series KonoSuba, Overlord and Re:Zero − Starting Life in Another World, all published by Kadokawa Corporation. The anime series began airing on April 9, 2019.

=== Film ===
An anime film based on the series was announced in January 2018, serving as a direct sequel to the first season. The film premiered on February 8, 2019. The film received a limited U.S. theater release on May 16, 2019, by Crunchyroll. Crunchyroll and Anime Limited screened the film at MCM London Comic Con on May 26, 2019. Crunchyroll also screened the film at Supanova Expo in Sydney and Perth in Australia on June 23 and June 30, 2019, respectively.

== Reception ==
By April 2018, the light novels and manga had a combined 3 million copies in print. By May 2020, the overall print series had over 6.5 million copies in circulation.

Writing for Anime News Network, Nick Creamer says Saga of Tanya the Evil is differentiated from the majority of isekai anime that have heroic otaku or everyday young men as their protagonists by having Tanya be evil. Creamer explicitly says "Tanya's crimes are our crimes", indicting the capitalist system that produced her past self as a ruthless salaryman, and the consequences thereof for her new self.
