= Cautious Hero: The Hero Is Overpowered but Overly Cautious =

Japanese light novel series and its franchise

- First light novel cover, featuring (from left to right) Elulu, Mash, Seiya Ryuuguuin, and Ristarte

この勇者が俺TUEEEくせに慎重すぎる (Kono Yūsha ga Ore Tsuē Kuse ni Shinchō Sugiru)
- Genre: Fantasy comedy, isekai
- Novel series
- Written by: Light Tuchihi
- Published by: Kakuyomu
- Original run: June 4, 2016 – present
- Light novel
- Written by: Light Tuchihi
- Illustrated by: Saori Toyota
- Published by: Fujimi Shobo
- English publisher: NA: Yen Press
- Imprint: Kadokawa Books
- Original run: February 10, 2017 – present
- Volumes: 7
- Manga
- Written by: Light Tuchihi
- Illustrated by: Koyuki
- Published by: Fujimi Shobo
- English publisher: NA: Yen Press
- Magazine: Monthly Dragon Age
- Original run: November 9, 2018 – October 7, 2022
- Volumes: 6
- Anime television series
- Directed by: Masayuki Sakoi
- Written by: Kenta Ihara
- Music by: Yoshiaki Fujisawa
- Studio: White Fox
- Licensed by: Crunchyroll (Note: In North America through Crunchyroll, LLC (formerly known as Funimation).); SA/SEA: Muse Communication
- Original network: AT-X, Tokyo MX, KBS, SUN, TVA, BS11
- English network: SEA: Aniplus Asia
- Original run: October 2, 2019 – December 27, 2019
- Episodes: 12
- icon

Cautious Hero: The Hero Is Overpowered but Overly Cautious (Japanese: この勇者が俺TUEEEくせに慎重すぎる, Hepburn: Kono Yūsha ga Ore Tsuē Kuse ni Shinchō Sugiru) is a Japanese light novel series written by Light Tuchihi and illustrated by Saori Toyota. It began serialization online in June 2016 on the Kadokawa's novel publishing website Kakuyomu. It was then acquired by Fujimi Shobo, who published the first light novel volume in February 2017 under their Kadokawa Books imprint. Seven volumes have been released as of December 2019. The light novel series is licensed in North America by Yen Press. A manga adaptation with art by Koyuki was serialized in Fujimi Shobo's shōnen manga magazine Monthly Dragon Age from November 2018 to October 2022. It has been collected in six tankōbon volumes. An anime television series adaptation by White Fox aired from October to December 2019.

== Plot ==
Ristarte is a novice goddess who is placed in charge of saving the world of Gaeabrande from a Demon Lord by summoning a human hero. An S-class world, Gaeabrande is extremely dangerous, so Ristarte is careful to select a hero who will be able to prevail against the enemies. She settles on Seiya Ryuuguuin, whose stats are many times greater than any other contender. Upon summoning him, Ristarte finds to her dismay that he is ridiculously cautious about everything, including her. Refusing to even enter Gaeabrande's safest areas until he has trained to a level that he is comfortable with, Seiya's reticence drives the goddess crazy. However, when the pair finally do set foot on Gaeabrande, events may prove this hero's caution is well justified.

== Characters ==
Seiya Ryuuguuin (竜宮院 聖哉, Ryūgūin Seiya)
Voiced by: Yūichirō Umehara (Japanese); Anthony Bowling (English)
An overpowered hero who excels at everything, except for one minor problem – he is too cautious.
Ristarte (リスタルテ, Risutarute)
Voiced by: Aki Toyosaki (Japanese); Jamie Marchi (English)
The Goddess of Healing who is tasked with choosing a hero to save Gaeabrande, to which end she summons Seiya. Upon first meeting Seiya, she is immediately infatuated with him due to his perfect physique and complexion.
Mash (マッシュ, Masshu)
Voiced by: Kengo Kawanishi (Japanese); Chris Thurman (English)
A young dragonkin warrior who ends up being Seiya's apprentice and one of his baggage carriers.
Elulu (エルル, Eruru)
Voiced by: Aoi Koga (Japanese); Sarah Wiedenheft (English)
A young dragonkin mage who is Mash's childhood friend. Like Mash, she ends up being one of Seiya's baggage carriers. Starting off as a magic caster, she learns and focuses more on support type abilities.
Ariadoa (アリアドア)
Voiced by: Hibiku Yamamura (Japanese); Marissa Lenti (English)
Ristarte's senior goddess, and her go-to goddess if Seiya needed someone to train him. The Goddess of Sealing, she has saved numerous worlds.
Cerceus (セルセウス, Seruseusu)
Voiced by: Atsushi Ono (Japanese); Chris Rager (English)
A brawny god who wields a sword. He is known as the Divine Blade. Seiya ran him to the ground during training, even to the point of hiding from him.
Ishtar (イシスター, Ishisutā)
Voiced by: Keiko Han (Japanese); Jessica Cavanagh (English)
The Great Goddess who serves as the leader of the other gods.
Valkyrie (ヴァルキュレ, Varukyure)
Voiced by: Fairouz Ai (Japanese); Katelyn Barr (English)
The Goddess of Destruction. Despite resistance, she goes on to train Seiya with a few restrictions.
Hestiaca (ヘスティカ, Hesutika)
Voiced by: Sayumi Watabe^{Ep. 5 credits} (Japanese); Kimberly Grace (English)
The Goddess of Fire.
Adenela (アデネラ, Adenera)
Voiced by: Shiori Izawa (Japanese); Alexis Tipton (English)
The Goddess of War. She has a major crush on Seiya, going berserk and demented when he rejected her at first.
Mitis (ミティス, Mitisu)
Voiced by: Kotono Mitsuishi (Japanese); Samantha Herek (English)
The Goddess of Archery. She is known for her nymphomania.

== Media ==
=== Light novels ===
The series was first published online in Kadokawa's user-generated novel publishing website Kakuyomu in June 2016 by Light Tuchihi. Later on, publisher Fujimi Shobo acquired the title and published the first volume as a light novel under their Kadokawa Books imprint in February 2017. The series is licensed in North America by Yen Press.

==== Volumes ====
No.	Original release date	Original ISBN	English release date	English ISBN
1	February 10, 2017	978-4-04-072184-2	June 18, 2019	978-1-9753-5688-0
2	June 9, 2017	978-4-04-072322-8	November 5, 2019	978-1-9753-5690-3
3	November 10, 2017	978-4-06-381415-6	April 14, 2020	978-1-9753-5692-7
4	May 10, 2018	978-4-04-072716-5	July 21, 2020	978-1-9753-5694-1
5	November 10, 2018	978-4-04-072956-5	November 17, 2020	978-1-9753-1575-7
6	October 10, 2019	978-4-04-073349-4	March 30, 2021	978-1-9753-2202-1
7	December 10, 2019	978-4-04-073417-0	October 5, 2021	978-1-9753-2204-5

=== Manga ===
A manga adaptation by Koyuki was serialized in Fujimi Shobo's Monthly Dragon Age from November 9, 2018, to October 7, 2022. The manga is also licensed in North America by Yen Press.

==== Volumes ====
No.	Original release date	Original ISBN	English release date	English ISBN
1	May 9, 2019	978-4-04-073152-0	February 4, 2020	978-1-9753-3286-0
2	October 9, 2019	978-4-04-073355-5	July 28, 2020	978-1-9753-1408-8
3	September 9, 2020	978-4-04-073798-0	July 13, 2021	978-1-9753-2557-2
4	June 8, 2021	978-4-04-074118-5	May 17, 2022	978-1-9753-4294-4
5	March 9, 2022	978-4-04-074462-9	February 28, 2023	978-1-9753-6285-0
6	December 9, 2022	978-4-04-074783-5	October 24, 2023	978-1-9753-7464-8

=== Anime ===
An anime television series adaptation by White Fox was announced on November 7, 2018. The series was directed by Masayuki Sakoi, with Kenta Ihara handling series composition, Mai Toda designing the characters, and Yoshiaki Fujisawa composing the music. It aired from October 2 to December 27, 2019, on AT-X and other channels. Myth & Roid performed the series' opening theme song "TIT FOR TAT", while Riko Azuna performed the series' ending theme song "be perfect, plz!".

Funimation licensed the series for a SimulDub. Following Sony's acquisition of Crunchyroll, the series was moved to Crunchyroll.

The third episode, which was supposed to air on October 16, 2019, was delayed by a week due to production issues, with a re-broadcast of Episode 2 taking its place. Similarly, Episode 10 was delayed for a week due to production issues, with a recap episode taking its place. Characters from the series have also appeared in the crossover anime series Isekai Quartet.

== Reception ==
Gadget Tsūshin listed Seiya's catchphrase in their 2019 anime buzzwords list.

== See also ==
- Full Dive, another light novel series by the same author
