= Drecom =

Japanese video game and light novel publisher

Drecom Co., Ltd.

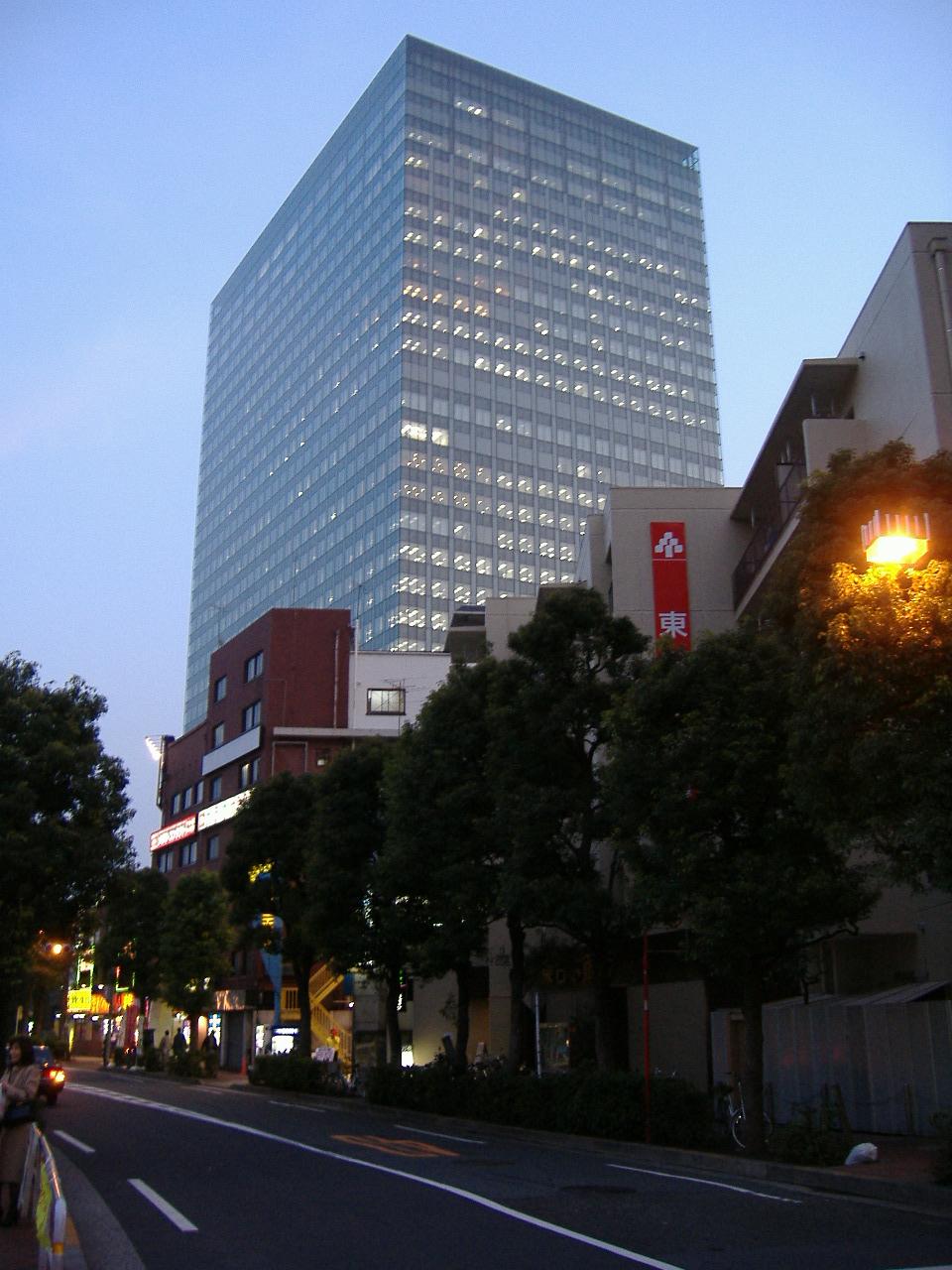
- Headquarters in Shinagawa, Tokyo
- Native name: 株式会社ドリコム
- Romanized name: Kabushiki gaisha Dorikomu
- Type: Public Company (K.K)
- Traded as: TYO: 3793
- Industry: Information and communications technology, Video games
- Founded: 13 November 2001; 24 years ago
- Founder: Yuki Naito
- Headquarters: Ōsaki, Shinagawa, Tokyo, Japan
- Key people: Representative Director, President, and chief executive officer: Yuki Naito; Director: Hideki Goto; Director, Audit and Supervisory ccommittee member: Rie Aoki; Director, Audit and Supervisory ccommittee member: Masao Murata; Director, Audit and Supervisory ccommittee member: Katsuhiko Shimizu; Executive Vice President: Yoshio Okumura; Executive Vice President: Yoshihiro Matsue; Executive Officer: Takeo Kawamura; Executive Officer: Motochika Furuya; Executive Officer: Keisuke Kanayama; Executive Officer: Masaaki Sato; Executive Officer: Shinnosuke Aimi
- Products: GGGGG; Wizardry Variants Daphne; New Japan Pro Wrestling Strong Spirits; Chokotto Farm; D Cide Traumerei; One Piece Treasure Cruise; Disgaea RPG; Derby Stallion Masters
- Services: Video games
- Total assets: 1,792,000,000 yen
- Number of employees: 386 (2022)
- Subsidiaries: Happy Happy Happy, Ltd. (株式会社ハッピーホッピーハッピー); DreUp, Ltd. (株式会社ドリアップ); Studio Rex, Ltd. (株式会社スタジオレックス); BlasTrain, Ltd. (株式会社BlasTrain)
- Website: drecom.co.jp; drecom-media.jp; drecom-media.jp/drenovels

Drecom Co., Ltd. (株式会社ドリコム, Kabushiki Gaisha Dorikomu) is a Japanese software, web, video game development and video game publishing company. Subsidiaries Drecom Media and DRE Novels publish light novels.

== History ==
The company was founded in 2001 by Representative Director and President Yuki Naito, who was a student at Kyoto University at the time. In 2006, Drecom went public, and was listed on the Mothers (Tokyo Stock Exchange) section of the Tokyo Stock Exchange starting on February 9 of that year.

== Web services ==
In 2003, Drecom started MyProfile, a service where users could write self-introductions and publish diaries. In September 2004, MyProfile was renamed to Drecom Blog, and upgraded with features better suited to blogging. The Drecom Blog service, which had over 230,000 members, ended in March 2010. It was announced that the personal service operation would be transferred to Livedoor, merging with Livedoor Blog. The corporate blogging packages were to be transferred to GaiaX.

On January 15, 2021, Drecom launched fan community service Rooot, which uses Twitter to connect fans with each other to boost fandom via point incentives.

== Blockchain and NFT ==
On July 5, 2018, the company released LoveChain, a service developed by the Drecom Invention Project department using blockchain technology, in both Japanese and English. With this service, couples could register their memories and promises together in the form of text and photographs to Ethereum's blockchain, preserving them. In the event of a breakup, couples had the ability to delete their pages, retaining the ability to create new ones for future relationships.

In a July 2022 interview, President Yuki Naito expressed an interest in releasing a blockchain game within the year. Naito further elaborated on his interest in Web3, stating that he hopes to get people more familiar and comfortable with the technology, including NFTs, via games such as the upcoming GGGGG.

== Partnerships and subsidiaries ==
On March 21, 2008, Rakuten announced its investment in 20.02% of Drecom's shares, becoming an equity-method affiliate. The two companies additionally made an agreement to form an internet advertising business alliance, leading to the user targeting technology of Rakuten ad4U.

On September 12, 2014, Drecom and Rakuten formed a joint venture, Social Learning Junbi Kaisha, in which Drecom owned 50.01%, with Drecom's Manabu Ishii as company president. Drecom's social learning business, which developed apps including Eipontan!, was to be split off and taken over by Social Learning Junbi Kaisha on November 5 of that year. According to a Drecom financial report, Social Learning Junbi Kaisha was renamed to ReDucate on November 5, 2014.

On May 12, 2016, it was announced that ReDucate would undergo a third-party allotment, changing the company from a subsidiary of Drecom to an equity-method affiliate. The business model was to shift from B2C to B2B, based on Rakuten's strength in that area.

On September 19, 2018, Drecom announced the dissolution of its capital and business alliance with Rakuten, as Rakuten had sold all of its shares in the company to Bandai Namco Holdings for 3 billion yen.

On March 1, 2020, it was reported that ReDucate was to disband, and its titles, including Eipontan!, were to close by the end of the next year.

Drecom first announced its cooperation with CrowdStar on December 15, 2009, along with the news that it would be localizing their title Happy Aquarium and offering it as a mixi application, along with plans to develop a mobile version. On August 25, 2010, CrowdStar announced its partnership with Drecom for the purpose of publishing its social games in Japan. Drecom launched CrowdStar titles Happy Aquarium and Happy Island on mixi, GREE, Yahoo! Mobage, and Hangame, with plans for the entire CrowdStar catalog to follow. The partnership was said to allow CrowdStar to launch its games in Japan more quickly, localize, test new mechanics, and improve its marketing. On November 11, 2010, Drecom additionally released CrowdStar simulation game HappyPets on Hangame.

On October 31, 2016, wholly owned subsidiary Grimoire (developer of Sword x Sword, Dragon x Dreizehn, and Brave Sword x Blaze Soul in the same Maken Denshō series, the latter of which has continued separately from Drecom) was sold to mobile game developing and management company Happy Elements, Ltd. for 226 million yen.

On August 3, 2017, Drecom, Ltd. and Bandai Namco Entertainment partnered and co-founded subsidiary BXD (shorthand for "Breakthrough x Digital Life"). BXD created the HTML5 gaming platform enza, which amassed over 5,000,000 players in 2019, bringing the project into profit in its second year of operation. It also created titles Dragon Ball Z Bucchigiri Match, Idolmaster Shiny Colors, Pro Yakyuu Famista Master Owners, and Naruto x Boruto Ninja Tribes.

On January 31, 2020, an agreement was made for Drecom to sell its remaining 49% stake in BXD to Bandai Namco Entertainment, which made it a fully owned subsidiary of Bandai Namco when the acquisition was completed in March 2020.

On June 7, 2023, Drecom pre-opened a manga publishing website called "DRE Comics".

== Games ==
- Chocotto Farm, a farming simulation game that has been running since January 18, 2011 on GREE, December 15, 2011, on mixi, August 20, 2013, on DoCoMo's dGame platform, February 19, 2014, on Mobage, and December 8, 2015, on Ameba. A special package of in-game items was offered as a bonus with the debut issue of Famitsu GREE magazine. The title has featured various collaborations with Sanrio characters, including a campaign for the 20th anniversary of Cinnamoroll, as well as a separate event collaboration with Mofy. Although standalone Android and iPhone versions of the game had also been released, they were both discontinued on November 27, 2019. However, the browser version still remains active.
- Disgaea RPG, a mobile entry in the Disgaea series, released on November 27, 2019, for Android and iOS and on August 25, 2020, for PC via DMM Games.
- Derby Stallion Masters, the first mobile entry in the Derby Stallion series, released on November 1, 2016, for Android and November 2, 2016, for iOS. Over 100,000 people signed up for the game in advance of its release.
- Evil Prince and the Puppet, an upcoming Android and iOS release scheduled for 2024, a dark fantasy adventure title aimed at the female market and planned/developed by Liber Entertainment (creators of A3!). The main scenario is written by Takumi Miyajima, who worked on Tales of the Abyss.
- Kirara Fantasia A fantasy RPG based on Manga Time Kirara, for Android and iOS. Over 770,000 people signed up for the game in advance of its December 11, 2017 release. Although the online mode is scheduled to close following maintenance on February 28, 2023, at 4 pm JST, the offline mode will remain playable afterwards for those who have already created data for it by that time.
- Mingol, a mobile entry in the Everybody's Golf series for both Android and iOS, released on July 4, 2017. It was ranked in the top 5 games of 2017 on Google Play. As of October 21, 2021, the application has been downloaded over 9,000,000 times. The application has featured collaboration campaigns featuring Xperia, Taiheiyo Club, Xxio, Dunlop Phoenix Tournament, RIZAP Golf, Fist of the North Star, #FR2Golf, and Ape Escape.
- New Japan Pro Wrestling Strong Spirits, a raising simulation game developed in collaboration with Bushiroad and featuring a starting roster of over 40 actual Japanese pro wrestlers, released worldwide for Android and iOS on February 28, 2022. Over 400,000 people signed up to join the game in advance. In the game, players train the wrestlers and battle them, accompanied by video of the real-life wrestlers. Starting on August 10, following maintenance (and continuing in later waves), women's professional wrestling promotion Stardom wrestlers were added to the game, beginning with Syuri and Manatsu Iwatani. A collaborative exhibition with Stardom was also run. Additional campaigns have featured Wrestling Dontaku and NJPW Dominion.
- One Piece Treasure Cruise, an RPG released on May 12, 2014, for iOS and Android. In November 2014, the game hit No. 1 in sales rankings on the iPhone App Store, and also held onto that spot at the time of its 5th anniversary in 2019. The game was additionally released in Canada, the United States, Europe, and Australia on February 4, 2015, at which time it had already been downloaded over 10,000,000 times.
- Project BEAT (working title), an upcoming versus fighting action game announced for Android and iOS.
- Tokyo Stories, announced for console and PC release on unannounced date, from Rain director Yuki Ikeda and featuring a style that combines 3D and pixel art.
- Wizardry Variants Daphne, a 3D dungeon RPG installment in the Wizardry series for smartphones released on October 15, 2024 and for PC released on March 6, 2025 via Steam. It was initially announced under the temporary title Wizardry VA. Drecom has announced the acquisition of international trademarks for "Wizardry", as well as copyrights for "Wizardry 6," “Wizardry 7," “Wizardry 8," and "Wizardry Gold."

=== Discontinued games ===
- Bikkuriman, a social card battle game released on April 18, 2011, for Android, GREE, and mixi, using the angel and devil themes of the chocolate wafers of the same name. As of December 17, 2012, when a Google Play version of the game was released for Android, it already had over 1,000,000 players.
- Cinderella Nine, a baseball scouting and raising sim game for smartphones and feature phones, initially released on Mobage and GREE. After it had over 300,000 players between the two platforms, it was additionally released for mixi on September 5, 2012.
- D Cide Traumerei, a turn-based RPG released on September 30, 2021, for Android and iOS, with a DMM PC version released on January 19, 2022; a closed beta test was run from July 29 until August 2, 2021. It was accompanied by a TV anime series, animated by Sanzigen, and featured motifs of the Cthulhu mythos. The game was written by Tadashi Satomi, who was also the writer for Persona 2: Innocent Sin and The Caligula Effect, and featured theme song "Kemono no Kotowari", which was written by Ringo Shiina, composed by Seiji Kameda, and arranged by Tokyo Jihen. It was discontinued on October 28, 2022.
- Dakkan! Mappa Mundi, released on August 9, 2012, for smartphones and feature phones via GREE. This game was Drecom's first original game created through foreign subsidiary, Snout. The game system was developed based on Drecom's hit title Sengoku Frontier. The title is Latin, meaning "world map".
- Dragon x Dreizehn, a fantasy card battle game released for feature phones and smartphones via GREE on July 20, 2012, developed by then-subsidiary Grimoire, and part of the Maken Denshō series along with Sword x Sword and later release Brave Sword x Blaze Soul. This title later became the basis for Drecom's Reign of Dragons.
- Eipontan! Anata no Level de Manaberu Eitango ("Eipontan! English vocabulary that can be learned at your level"), a social edutainment game for learning English, released on both Android and iOS on December 17, 2013. As of March 5, 2014, it had been downloaded over 1,000,000 times. A collaboration campaign ran featuring San-X character Rilakkuma.
- Fantasista Doll Girls Royale Based on the anime Fantasista Doll, this game was released for iOS on September 2, 2013, and for Android on October 18, 2013. In its first four days, the iOS version had been downloaded over 100,000 times.
- FullBokko Heroes X, an action RPG for iOS and Android. Over 250000 people signed up for the game in advance of its release. As of April 11, 2016, the application had been downloaded over 5,500,000 times. The game featured collaborations with Attack on Titan, Puella Magi Madoka Magica, Fate/stay night, Mr. Osomatsu, God Eater, Fairy Tail, Secret of Mana, Rise of Mana, Fullmetal Alchemist, and Show by Rock!!. The game ended on May 27, 2019.
- Gakeppuchi Busters, an action RPG game for smartphones, released on April 27, 2015.
- GGGGG, a cooperative and versus fighting mobile game which uses blockchain technology. Up to 100 players can compete against each other in a battle royale, teams can be formed of up to four people for cooperative dungeon exploration; various battle modes will be featured. Advance signups were opened on the App Store and Google Play on September 20, 2022. A limited run of 3,456 in-game NFT skins will be offered, of which there will only be one of each worldwide. Although these NFTs are free to mint, the game can be fully played without them. Service ended in November 30, 2023.
- Guildian Brave, a social card battle game released via GREE on January 18, 2013.
- Himegami Blade, a social card battle game set in the Sengoku era and released for smartphones and feature phones via GREE on September 14, 2012.
- Kamioku no Frontier, a card battle game released for smartphones and feature phones via GREE in June 2013. Users could create their own original cards, using over 10,000,000 possible combinations of customizations.
- Kronos Mirai Senki, a social card battle game released on October 12, 2012, for smartphones and feature phones via mixi and on December 26, 2012, via Mobage.
- Maple Story Brave Monsters, a GREE release playable on iPhone, Android, and feature phones. It reached 100,000 players in approximately two weeks.
- Miko Note, a miko raising sim and 3D action RPG released on February 21, 2022, for Android and iOS. The game had initially been announced on February 5, 2019, by Korean development company MADORCA. An accompanying web short anime was also released, along with a set of LINE stickers. It had been featured by FamitsuApp as an anticipated release for 2022. The game closed in July 2022.
- Monster Arms, a social card battle game for iOS, released in Japan on April 24, 2012, after first being released in Canada and the United States. Players were able to connect with users in different countries.
- Onmyoji ~Heian Youkitan~, released on December 20, 2010, for Android and iOS, via GREE and mixi.
- Reign of Dragons, an Android and iOS successor to Dragon x Dreizehn, released in both Japan and the United States via GREE. It was additionally released in China, Macau, Hong Kong, and Taiwan on April 9, 2014, under the title 龙之崛起-风靡欧美战争卡牌. At that time, it had already been installed over 4,000,000 times, and ranked in the top 10 App Store games in the United States.
- Seikoku no Jeanne d'Arc, a GREE exclusive with scenarios by Ichiro Tezuka
- Sangoku Frontier, a Romance of the Three Kingdoms-themed social game, released for smartphones and feature phones via GREE on August 21, 2012.
- Sengoku Frontier, a social card battle game for Android, iOS, feature phones, GREE and mixi. As of September 18, 2012, the game had over 500,000 players on GREE and 100,000 on mixi.
- Spirit Force, Drecom's first native iOS game, which was released on April 9, 2012.
- Sword x Sword, a February 22, 2012 GREE release for smartphones and feature phones. It was developed by then-subsidiary Grimoire, and part of the Maken Denshō series along with Dragon x Dreizehn and later release Brave Sword x Blaze Soul. In April 2021, the 10th anniversary of this game was commemorated with a special illustration from Kawasumi, a 10th anniversary logo designed by staff from the time, and a message from the producers.
- World of Final Fantasy Meli-Melo a Final Fantasy monster summoning and raising simulation RPG released on December 12, 2017, for Android and iOS, featuring Shinji Hashimoto as executive producer and Hiroki Chiba as director. Over 400,000 people signed up for the game in advance. Based on the PlayStation 4 and PlayStation Vita title World of Final Fantasy, it was billed as "the cutest Final Fantasy". The game ended approximately one year later, on December 13, 2018, with Twitter users lamenting its short operation period and wishing for a console release.
- Yankee Legend, a GREE social card battle game released on April 19, 2011.

== Light novels published by Drecom ==
Title	Author	Illustrator	No. of volumes
The 100th Time's the Charm: She Was Executed 99 Times, So How Did She Unlock "Super Love" Mode?!	Yuji Yuji	Nami Hidaka	3
Accidentally in Love: The Witch, the Knight, and the Love Potion Slipup	Harunadon	Eda	2
The Apothecary Witch Turned Divorce Agent	Kosuzu Kobato	Yasuyuki Syuri	2
Blade & Bastard	Kumo Kagyu	so-bin	4
The Crown of Rutile Quartz	Surume Enoki	ttl	2
The Death of the Skeleton Swordsman: Dominating as a Cursed Saint	Hozumi Mitaka	fame	2
Fiancée No More: The Forsaken Lady, the Prince, and Their Make-Believe Love	Mari Morikawa	Bodax	3
The Greatest Magician's Ultimate Quest: I Woke From a 300 Year Slumber to a World of Disappointment	Matsue Fukuyama	Genyaky	2
The Holy Grail of Eris	Kujira Tokiwa	Yuunagi	5
I Only Have Six Months to Live, So I’m Gonna Break the Curse with Light Magic or Die Trying	Genkotsu Kumano	Falmaro	3
Jeanette the Genius: Defying My Evil Stepmother by Starting a Business with My Ride-or-Die Fiancé!	Miyako Miyano	Hayase Jyun	3
Make It Stop! I'm Not Strong… It's Just My Sword!	Manzi Mazi	Kabotya	2
Marriage, Divorce, and Beyond: The White Mage and Black Knight's Romance Reignited	Takasugi Naturu	kieshi akaz	2
A Pale Moon Reverie	Kuji Furumiya	Teruko Arai	3
The Royal Hostage Has Vanished: The Black Wolf Knight Yearns for the Persecuted Princess	Ajigozen	Yura Chujo	2
A Royal Rebound: Forget My Ex-Fiancé, I'm Being Pampered by the Prince!	Micoto Sakurai	Kuroyuki	3
RVing My Way into Exile with My Beloved Cat: This Villainess Is Trippin'	Punichan	Canarinu	3
Safe & Sound in the Arms of an Elite Knight	Fuyu Aoki	Minori Aritani	3
Stuck in a Time Loop: When All Else Fails, Be a Villainess	Sora Hinokage	Tsukasa Kiryu	3
Survival Strategies of a Corrupt Aristocrat	Wanta	Yunagi	3
The Troubles of Miss Nicola the Exorcist	Ito Iino	Kinokohime	3
