= Carlo Zen (author) =

Japanese novelist

Carlo Zen カルロ・ゼン
- Occupation: Novelist
- Writing career
- Language: Japanese
- Period: 2013–present
- Notable work: The Saga of Tanya the Evil (2013–present)
- Website: sonzaix.blog.fc2

Carlo Zen (カルロ・ゼン) is a Japanese novelist and game scenario writer. Almost nothing is known about his real identity and his pseudonym is based on the Venetian admiral Carlo Zeno.

== Career ==
Zen originally released his novel The Saga of Tanya the Evil (幼女戦記, Yōjo Senki; lit. The Military Chronicles of a Little Girl') on the user-generated novel publishing website Arcadia. In June 2013, the first volume of this series was published by Enterbrain.

The series would later be adapted to manga, anime and a film. The novel and manga are being translated into English by Yen Press.

== Works ==
=== Novels ===
- The Saga of Tanya the Evil (幼女戦記) (Illustrated by Shinobu Shinotsuki, published by Enterbrain, 14 volumes, 2013–)
- Yakusoku no Kuni (約束の国) (Original character designs by Shinobu Shinotsuki, illustrated by Hidetoshi Iwamoto, published by Seikaisha FICTIONS, 4 volumes, 2014–2017)
- Seventh Dragon 3 UE72 Mikan no Yūma (セブンスドラゴン3 UE72 未完のユウマ) (Original by Sega, illustrated by Shirow Miwa, published by Seikaisha FICTIONS, 2016)
- Jyūma Taisen Okotahakarigoto Renri (銃魔大戦 怠謀連理) (Illustrated by Mura, published by Enterbrain, 2016)
- Yakitori: Soldiers of Misfortune (ヤキトリ) (Illustrated by so-bin, published by Hayakawa Bunko JA, 2 volumes, 2017–)

=== Manga ===
- The Saga of Tanya the Evil (幼女戦記) (Original character designs by Shinobu Shinotsuki, illustrated by Chika Tōjō, published by Comp Ace, 29 volumes, 2016–)
- Baikoku Kikan (売国機関) (Illustrated by Yoshinao Shina, published by Kurage Bunch, 5 volumes, 2018–)
- Terror-kyōju no Ayashii Jyugyō (テロール教授の怪しい授業) (Illustrated by Ten Ishida, published by Morning, 4 volumes, 2018–)
- Ashita no Teki to Kyō no Akushu o (明日の敵と今日の握手を) (Illustrated by Ikumi Fukuda, published by Dokodemo Young Champion, 2022–)

=== Game scenarios ===
- Chaos Dragon Konton Sensō (ケイオスドラゴン 混沌戦争) (Vallagan Kyōwakoku Renbō (ヴァラガン共和国連邦) scenario)
- Jyūma no Reza Nation (銃魔のレザネーション) (Original creator, scenario)

=== Magazine publications and anthologies ===
Fiction

- Yakitori 1 Issengorin no Kidō Kōka (ヤキトリ 1 一銭五厘の軌道降下) (Published in S-F Magazine) (August 2017 edition)
- Shinsei Songen (神聖尊厳) (Saredo Zainin wa Ryū to Odoru Orchestra = Dances with the Dragons) (されど罪人は竜と踊るオルケストラ = Dances with the Dragons) (Original creator Rabo Asai, published by Gagaga Bunko, January 2018 edition)
- Carlo Zen no Baai (Jyaga Tom Keisatsu no Koroshikata) and others, (Sakka Tobōmeshi), (Published by Seikaisha FICTIONS, May 2020, reprint from dōjinshi)

Essays

- a day in my squad731 - case.177 (Published in Shōsetsu Subaru, November 2017 edition)
