= Disgaea RPG =

2019 video game

- Developers: Drecom, ForwardWorks
- Publisher: JP: Nippon Ichi Software
- Series: Disgaea
- Platforms: iOS, Android, Microsoft Windows
- Release: JP: March 19, 2019; WW: April 13, 2021
- Genre: Role-playing game
- Mode: Single-player

Disgaea RPG (Note: Japanese: 魔界戦記ディスガイア, Hepburn: Makai Senki Disgaea RPG; lit. 'Netherworld Battle Chronicle: Disgaea RPG') is a spin-off title of the Disgaea series for iOS and Android devices. It is published by Nippon Ichi Software and jointly developed by Drecom and ForwardWorks. It was released in Japan on March 19, 2019. The game is free-to-play and monetized with microtransactions to obtain in-game currency; this in-game currency allows players to collect randomized characters in a gacha system.

== Gameplay ==
Disgaea RPG is an active-time turn-based RPG, unlike the strategy RPG nature of the console titles. Players form parties consisting of five characters and take on waves of enemies in various modes. Many features from the mainline games return, including character reincarnation, lifting and throwing of items or characters, Team and "Tower" attacks, character special abilities known as evilities, and the Item World system for powering up equipment. This also includes "the tremendous levels and damage that is synonymous with Disgaea" according to Nippon Ichi president Sohei Niikawa, such as a maximum level of 9999 and attacks that deal 1 trillion damage.

The story of the game takes place after the events of the mainline Disgaea titles. It continues the development of the main characters from every title and introduces several original characters, notably Lucy, Diez, and Torachiyo. The game casts the player as a human who has been summoned to the Netherworld to raise The Strongest Overlord.

== History ==
Since its initial release on March 19, 2019, the service faced multiple reported issues and underwent maintenance for several months, relaunching in November 2019. Since the relaunch, the game has proceeded more smoothly and successfully without the technical glitches that marred the original release. In December 2020, it was announced that the game will have an English version release on April 13, 2021. The English version of the game is developed by Boltrend Games.

In November 2021, Boltrend released an early-access Steam port of the international (English) version of Disgaea RPG for Windows PCs.

In April 2023, Boltrend announced that their international version of Disgaea RPG would be shutting down in May 2023.
