= My Next Life as a Villainess: All Routes Lead to Doom! =

Japanese light novel series and its franchise

- First light novel volume cover, featuring (from left to right) Geordo Stuart, Alan Stuart, and Catarina Claes

乙女ゲームの破滅フラグしかない悪役令嬢に転生してしまった… (Otome Gēmu no Hametsu Furagu Shika Nai Akuyaku Reijō ni Tensei Shite Shimatta…)
- Genre: Isekai, reverse harem, romantic comedy
- Novel series
- Written by: Satoru Yamaguchi
- Published by: Shōsetsuka ni Narō
- Original run: July 6, 2014 – March 23, 2015
- Light novel
- Written by: Satoru Yamaguchi
- Illustrated by: Nami Hidaka
- Published by: Ichijinsha
- English publisher: NA: J-Novel Club
- Imprint: Ichijinsha Bunko Iris
- Original run: August 20, 2015 – present
- Volumes: 16
- Manga
- Illustrated by: Nami Hidaka
- Published by: Ichijinsha
- English publisher: NA: Seven Seas Entertainment
- Magazine: Monthly Comic Zero Sum
- Original run: August 28, 2017 – present
- Volumes: 13
- Manga

My Next Life as a Villainess Side Story: On the Verge of Doom!
- Written by: Satoru Yamaguchi
- Illustrated by: Nishi
- Published by: Ichijinsha
- English publisher: NA: Seven Seas Entertainment
- Magazine: Monthly Comic Zero Sum
- Original run: November 1, 2019 – July 2, 2021
- Volumes: 3
- Anime television series
- Directed by: Keisuke Inoue
- Produced by: Hiroyuki Aoki; Takashi Jinguuji; Kei Nishi; Yutaka Suwa
- Written by: Megumi Shimizu
- Music by: Natsumi Tabuchi; Hanae Nakamura; Tatsuhiko Saiki; Miki Sakurai; Shuu Kanematsu
- Studio: Silver Link
- Licensed by: Crunchyroll (streaming); NA: Sentai Filmworks (home video); SEA: Muse Communication
- Original network: Tokyo MX, BS11, MBS, AT-X, J Tele
- English network: SEA: Animax Asia
- Original run: April 5, 2020 – June 21, 2020
- Episodes: 12
- Anime television series

My Next Life as a Villainess: All Routes Lead to Doom! X
- Directed by: Keisuke Inoue
- Produced by: Hiroyuki Aoki; Takashi Jinguuji; Kei Nishi; Yutaka Suwa
- Written by: Megumi Shimizu
- Music by: Natsumi Tabuchi; Hanae Nakamura; Tatsuhiko Saiki; Miki Sakurai; Shuu Kanematsu; Sayaka Aoki; Junko Nakajima; Kanade Sakuma
- Studio: Silver Link
- Licensed by: Crunchyroll (streaming); SEA: Muse Communication
- Original network: JNN (MBS, TBS), BS Asahi
- English network: SEA: Animax Asia
- Original run: July 3, 2021 – September 18, 2021
- Episodes: 12 + OVA
- Anime film
- My Next Life as a Villainess: All Routes Lead to Doom! The Movie (2023)
- icon

My Next Life as a Villainess: All Routes Lead to Doom! (Japanese: 乙女ゲームの破滅フラグしかない悪役令嬢に転生してしまった…, Hepburn: Otome Gēmu no Hametsu Furagu Shika Nai Akuyaku Reijō ni Tensei Shite Shimatta…; lit. I Reincarnated into an Otome Game as a Villainess with Only Destruction Flags…), also known as HameFura (はめふら) for short, is a Japanese light novel series written by Satoru Yamaguchi and illustrated by Nami Hidaka. It began serialization online in July 2014 on the user-generated novel publishing website Shōsetsuka ni Narō. It was acquired by Ichijinsha, which published the first light novel volume in August 2015 under its Ichijinsha Bunko Iris imprint. Sixteen volumes have been released as of August 2026. The light novel has been licensed in North America by J-Novel Club.

A manga adaptation with art by Hidaka has been serialized in Ichijinsha's josei manga magazine Monthly Comic Zero Sum since August 2017. It has been collected in thirteen tankōbon volumes and licensed in English by Seven Seas Entertainment. A spin-off manga was serialized from November 2019 to July 2021. An anime television series adaptation produced by Silver Link aired from April to June 2020, and a second season aired from July to September 2021. An anime film premiered in December 2023.

== Premise ==
Catarina Claes, the young daughter of a noble family, one day bumps her head and regains memories of her past life as a 17-year-old otaku girl. It is then that she realizes she has been reborn into the world of the otome game Fortune Lover as the game's villainess who, regardless of what route the player took in the original game, is doomed to be either exiled or killed. To avoid these routes that lead to doom, Catarina begins taking countermeasures. This, however, ends up having unexpected consequences on her relations with the other characters of the game's world.

== Characters ==
Catarina Claes (Note: Written as "Katarina" in the English light novel and manga releases.) (カタリナ・クラエス, Katarina Kuraesu; nicknamed "Bakarina" by fans)
Voiced by: Maaya Uchida (Japanese); Jeannie Tirado (English)
A 17-year-old high school student and otaku who has been reincarnated as the real-life villainess character of the game Fortune Lover after she was hit by a car while heading to school. Having extensive knowledge of the game, she intentionally changes the most important game scenes, altering her own path to avoid as many bad endings as possible. Even though her earth magic is weak, she has excellent charisma. Her good-hearted nature leads to many of the main characters falling in love with her, but Catarina is too dense to understand their true intentions. In her mind, she has five Catarina personalities, discussing and solving problems whenever she is in a crisis.
Geordo Stuart (ジオルド・スティアート, Jiorudo Sutiāto) (Note: Written as "Jeord" in the English light novel and manga releases.)
Voiced by: Shouta Aoi, Asami Seto (childhood) (Japanese); Griffin Burns (English)
The third prince of Sorcier Kingdom who became Catarina's fiancé after he inadvertently caused her to trip and become injured, forcing him to take responsibility. He is the first capture target in Fortune Lover. In the game, he exiles Catarina and marries the protagonist Maria in the good ending, while the bad ending has him kill Catarina and abandoning Maria due to guilt. Due to Catarina's continued efforts to improve her situation and avoid the bad endings, he now has developed genuine feelings for her and continuously tries to demonstrate his affection, only for her to remain oblivious of his feelings.
Katarina blatantly tells him she wants to end the engagement, Geordo ignores her input; despite the fact she clearly wants nothing to do with him.
Keith Claes (キース・クラエス, Kīsu Kuraesu)
Voiced by: Tetsuya Kakihara, Sora Amamiya (childhood) (Japanese); Griffin Puatu (English)
Catarina's adoptive brother and an earth magic prodigy, who her father adopted after his father, a distant relative, died. He is the second capture target in Fortune Lover. In the game, he grows up lonely and becomes a womanizer but abandons his womanizing ways for the protagonist. In the game's endings, he either exiles Catarina for her crimes or kills her with magic as a retaliation for fatally injuring Maria. Due to this, Catarina decided to treat Keith better and stop him from feeling lonely. As a result, Keith grew up to be a proper gentleman who treats ladies gently and kindly, but also became a sis-con, resulting in him wanting to annul Catarina and Geordo's engagement.
Alan Stuart (アラン・スティアート, Aran Sutiāto)
Voiced by: Tatsuhisa Suzuki, Mutsumi Tamura (childhood) (Japanese); Bryce Papenbrook (English)
Geordo's twin brother and Mary's fiancé, and the third capture target in the game Fortune Lover. He's competitive, hotheaded, and a bit dense. His route in the original game does not feature Catarina, with Mary becoming Maria's rival instead. In this timeline, however, due to Mary falling in love with Catarina, Alan saw her as a rival and challenged her to various contests, leading to her discovering his talent for music, which he downplays due to his jealousy of Geordo for being treated as his superior by other nobles. After Catarina showed him Geordo's weakness, Alan became more confident and befriended Catarina. He harbors feelings for Catarina but has not realized it yet due to Mary and Geordo's efforts to mislead him.
Nicol Ascart (ニコル・アスカルト, Nikoru Asukaruto)
Voiced by: Yoshitsugu Matsuoka, M.A.O (childhood) (Japanese); Nicolas Roye (English)
Geordo and Alan's childhood friend and Sophia's brother. He is the fourth capture target in Fortune Lover. He is silent, aloof, and very handsome, with his smile capable of knocking out all girls who saw it. As with Alan, Catarina is not featured in his route, and Sophia is the "rival" instead, with his route requires the player to befriend her first to get him to start loving Maria. He is the only capture target that Catarina has little knowledge about, as she has not played his route yet before she died in her previous life.
In the current timeline, as Sophia is friends with Catarina, Nicol began taking interest in her as well, much to Geordo and Keith's chagrin and Sophia's deep support. Though he acknowledge that his feelings were wrong (as Catarina is already engaged to his childhood friend), he would not hesitate to take some chances to earn her affection.
Mary Hunt (メアリ・ハント, Meari Hanto)
Voiced by: Miho Okasaki (Japanese); Colleen O'Shaughnessey (English)
Alan's fiancée and the rival character during his path in the game. In the original game, they never interacted with each other. After Catarina praises her gardening in place of Alan by accident, Mary falls in love with her; developing plans to elope and escape the country should Katarina chose her. She is very possessive with Catarina and attempt to shoo away Geordo and Keith, while preventing Alan from realizing his feelings to Catarina.
As Mary and Alan never fell in love with each other in this timeline, they used the engagement as an excuse to prevent future suitors from chasing them, while having a partner-in-crime relationship.
Sophia Ascart (ソフィア・アスカルト, Sofia Asukaruto)
Voiced by: Inori Minase (Japanese); Kira Buckland (English)
Nicol's sister and the rival character during his path in the game. She has silver hair and red eyes, resembling an albino snake, causing her to be bullied by other noble children, while also shunned by their parents for being "cursed". She loves reading so much, and was surprised to find a reading friend in Catarina. After befriending her and realizing that her brother has feelings for her, she tried her best to help him realize this feeling, so that she can be Catarina's sister-in-law.
It is eventually revealed that she is actually the reincarnation of Catarina's best friend during her previous life, Atsuko Sasaki (佐々木 敦子, Sasaki Atsuko). Unlike Katarina, she is not aware of her past life, though a lot of her mannerisms reminds Catarina of her.
Maria Campbell (マリア・キャンベル, Maria Kyanberu)
Voiced by: Saori Hayami (Japanese); Melissa Fahn (English)
A girl who, in Fortune Lover, was the main protagonist. She has a rare light magic ability. Because the game world has no concept of recessive traits coming from ancestors, her mother was falsely accused of infidelity; leading to her father leaving them and her mother keeping her distance.
In the game's storyline, the capture targets fell in love with her kind and steadfast attitude, with her falling in love with the capture targets in turn after they saved her from Catarina's bullying or after they praised her homemade sweets. In this timeline, it was Catarina who did all of the above, causing Maria to fall in love with her.
Later, when Catarina was supposed to face her exile ending, with other jealous nobles trying to frame her for bullying Maria, she and her friends defends her honor, thus allowing Catarina to avoid her first doom flag.
Sirius Dieke (シリウス・ディーク, Shiriusu Dīku) / Raphael Walt (ラファエル・ウォルト, Rafaeru Woruto)
Voiced by: Toshiki Masuda, Yoko Hikasa^{Ep. 11 credits} (childhood) (Japanese); Chris Hackney (English)
A second-year student and the president of the student council, who played a side role in Fortune Lover. He possesses the fabled dark magic and is the second villain in a secret route.
Katarina saves him by having the secret of why he's resentful exposed; he is illegitimate child who resembled his half brother who was dying. The legal wife attempted to transfer the boy's soul into him, but it only gave Sirius his memories.
Anne Shelley (アン・シェリー, An Sherī)
Voiced by: Azumi Waki (Japanese); Cherami Leigh (English)
Catarina's personal maid. She keeps tabs on Catarina for her mother. She was born from an infidelity between a noble and a maid, but her father kept her for political reasons, until she got into an accident that scars her body and killed her mother, causing her father to kick her out of the house for being "useless goods". She then worked at the Claes household until her father found a suitor for her. She was forced to come home, but Catarina heavily protests this, and after a negotiation with the Claes patriarch, she permanently became Catarina's personal maid, earning her eternal gratitude and loyalty.
Millidiana Claes (ミリディアナ・クラエス, Miridiana Kuraesu)
Voiced by: Akiko Hiramatsu^{Ep. 1 credits} (Japanese); Laura Post (English)
Duchess Millidiana Claes is Catarina's biological mother and Keith's adopted mother. In the original game, her strict and snobbish attitude served as a template for Catarina's personality later in life. In the current timeline, she has a better disposition due to Catarina's drastic change in personality, which causes her to slowly mellow out. She is dismayed with her daughter's wild and unladylike behavior since the latter is engaged to a prince. As a result, she would prefer Catarina break her engagement with Geordo to save the Claes family any more embarrassment; Katarina wants nothing more than to oblige, but Geordo won't take a clue.
Luigi Claes (ルイジ・クラエス, Ruiji Kuraesu)
Voiced by: Takuto Yokoyama^{Ep. 1 credits} (Japanese); Chris Hackney (English)
Duke Luigi Claes is Catarina's biological father and Keith's adopted father. In the original game, him spoiling Catarina rotten is the root cause of her arrogant and demanding attitude. In the current timeline, not much has changed, but due to Catarina's new independent personality, she never asked too much from her father. After Catarina got engaged to Geordo, he adopted Keith, the bastard son of one of his relatives, to continue the Claes family name. However, this caused a misunderstanding with his wife who thought that Keith was his biological son before Catarina helped cleared up the misunderstanding.
Geoffrey Stuart (ジェフリー・スティアート, Jefurī Sutiāto)
Voiced by: Takehito Koyasu (Japanese); Adin Rudd (English)
The oldest prince, brother of Geordo and Alan. Despite being first line for the throne, Geoffrey has no interest in becoming king and would rather have one of his younger brothers be king instead.
Susanna Randall (スザンナ・ランドール, Suzanna Randōru)
Voiced by: Sumire Uesaka (Japanese); Erin Yvette (English)
Geoffrey's fiancée. A master of disguise, she is also known as Larna Smith (ラーナ・スミス, Rāna Sumisu), the head of the Kingdom's Department of Magic. Though they are engaged, both Susanna and Geoffrey have no feelings for each other and are only engaged out of convenience.
Ian Stuart (イアン・スティアート, Ian Sutiāto)
Voiced by: Yusuke Shirai (Japanese); Daman Mills (English)
The second prince in line for the throne and Geordo and Alan's second eldest brother. He is quiet and reserved. Currently, he is competing with his brother Geordo for the throne, as Geoffrey has forfeited his right to it.
Selena Berg (セリーナ・バーグ, Serīna Bāgu)
Voiced by: Yui Ogura (Japanese); Julia McIlvaine (English)
Ian's fiancée. The daughter of a prominent noble family with powerful magic, she was engaged to Ian as part of an arrangement between their families. However, she herself has weak magic.
Rufus Brode (ルーファス・ブロード, Rūfasu Burōdo) / Sora Smith (ソラ・スミス, Sora Sumisu)
Voiced by: Kohsuke Toriumi, Yūko Sanpei (young) (Japanese); Kylen Deporter, Amber Lee Connors (young) (English)
A butler employed by Selena, he is befriended by Catarina.

== Media ==
=== Light novels ===
The first light novel volume was published by Ichijinsha under their Ichijinsha Bunko Iris imprint on August 20, 2015. As of August 2026, sixteen volumes have been published. The light novel is licensed in North America by J-Novel Club.

No.	Original release date	Original ISBN	English release date	English ISBN
1	August 20, 2015	978-4-7580-4753-1	November 17, 2018 (e-book); May 5, 2020 (paperback)	978-1-7183-6660-2
2	September 19, 2015	978-4-7580-4756-2	February 8, 2019 (e-book); July 7, 2020 (paperback)	978-1-7183-6661-9
3	February 20, 2016	978-4-7580-4800-2	May 4, 2019 (e-book); September 1, 2020 (paperback)	978-1-7183-6662-6
4	July 20, 2016	978-4-7580-4838-5	August 6, 2019 (e-book); November 3, 2020 (paperback)	978-1-7183-6663-3
5	May 20, 2017	978-4-7580-4950-4	April 26, 2020 (e-book); January 5, 2021 (paperback)	978-1-7183-6664-0
6	March 20, 2018	978-4-7580-9045-2	June 28, 2020 (e-book); March 2, 2021 (paperback)	978-1-7183-6665-7
7	October 20, 2018	978-4-7580-9113-8; 978-4-7580-9114-5 (SE)	September 23, 2020 (e-book); May 4, 2021 (paperback)	978-1-7183-6666-4
8	July 20, 2019	978-4-7580-9189-3	November 28, 2020 (e-book); July 6, 2021 (paperback)	978-1-7183-6667-1
9	April 20, 2020	978-4-7580-9261-6; 978-4-7580-9262-3 (SE)	July 1, 2021 (e-book); February 1, 2022 (paperback)	978-1-7183-6668-8
10	February 20, 2021	978-4-7580-9339-2	October 20, 2021 (e-book); June 7, 2022 (paperback)	978-1-7183-6669-5
11	August 20, 2021	978-4-7580-9390-3; 978-4-7580-9391-0 (SE)	January 24, 2022 (e-book); September 6, 2022 (paperback)	978-1-7183-6670-1
12	October 20, 2022	978-4-7580-9499-3	January 31, 2024 (e-book); December 10, 2024 (paperback)	978-1-7183-6671-8
13	September 20, 2023	978-4-7580-9582-2	December 20, 2024 (e-book); November 11, 2025 (paperback)	978-1-7183-6672-5
14	August 20, 2024	978-4-7580-9668-3	June 4, 2025 (e-book); May 11, 2026 (paperback)	978-1-7183-6673-2
15	July 18, 2025	978-4-7580-9743-7	May 15, 2026 (e-book)	978-1-7183-3228-7
16	August 20, 2026	978-4-8251-0107-4	—	—

=== Manga ===
There have been two manga series associated with the light novel. The first, My Next Life as a Villainess: All Routes Lead to Doom!, has been serialized in Ichijinsha's Monthly Comic Zero Sum since August 28, 2017, and adapts the light novel series into manga format. The second, My Next Life as a Villainess Side Story: On the Verge of Doom! (乙女ゲームの破滅フラグしかない悪役令嬢に転生してしまった... 絶体絶命！破滅寸前編), was also serialized in Monthly Comic Zero Sum from November 1, 2019, to July 2, 2021. This manga focuses on the question of what would happen if Catarina were to recover her memories when she was fifteen as opposed to during her childhood, leaving her without the friends and relationships that she garnered as a result of early planning against her bad ends. Both manga series are licensed by Seven Seas Entertainment.

Ichijinsha published a yuri anthology of the series, titled My Next Life as a Villainess Side Story: Girls Patch (乙女ゲームの破滅フラグしかない悪役令嬢に転生してしまった... GIRLS PATCH), on June 26, 2020. The anthology is also licensed by Seven Seas Entertainment.

==== Volumes ====
===== My Next Life as a Villainess: All Routes Lead to Doom! =====
No.	Original release date	Original ISBN	English release date	English ISBN
1	March 24, 2018	978-4-7580-3338-1	September 7, 2019	978-1-64275-329-5
2	October 25, 2018	978-4-7580-3394-7	November 19, 2019	978-1-64275-730-9
3	April 25, 2019	978-4-7580-3429-6; 978-4-75-803430-2 (SE)	April 7, 2020	978-1-64505-230-2
4	October 25, 2019	978-4-7580-3464-7	October 13, 2020	978-1-64505-765-9
5	May 25, 2020	978-4-7580-3513-2; 978-4-7580-3514-9 (SE)	April 13, 2021	978-1-64827-107-6
6	January 25, 2021	978-4-7580-3576-7	November 23, 2021	978-1-64827-355-1
7	September 30, 2021	978-4-7580-3653-5; 978-4-7580-3654-2 (SE)	August 9, 2022	978-1-63858-307-3
8	September 30, 2022	978-4-7580-3792-1	August 22, 2023	978-1-63858-897-9
9	June 30, 2023	978-4-7580-3903-1	April 23, 2024	979-8-88843-764-3
10	March 29, 2024	978-4-7580-8484-0	December 24, 2024	979-8-89160-647-0
11	December 26, 2024	978-4-7580-8632-5	August 26, 2025	979-8-89561-698-7
12	August 29, 2025	978-4-7580-8783-4	June 30, 2026	979-8-89765-350-8
13	May 29, 2026	978-4-7580-9913-4	—	—

===== My Next Life as a Villainess Side Story: On the Verge of Doom! =====
No.	Original release date	Original ISBN	English release date	English ISBN
1	May 25, 2020	978-4-7580-3515-6	December 28, 2021	978-1-64827-382-7
2	January 25, 2021	978-4-7580-3577-4	March 29, 2022	978-1-63858-148-2
3	July 30, 2021	978-4-7580-3632-0	November 8, 2022	978-1-63858-609-8

=== Anime ===
An anime adaptation of the light novel series was announced by Ichijinsha on October 19, 2018. The anime was later announced to be a television series on July 18, 2019. The series was animated by Silver Link and directed by Keisuke Inoue, with Megumi Shimizu handling series composition, and Miwa Oshima designing the characters. Natsumi Tabuchi, Hanae Nakamura, Tatsuhiko Saiki, Miki Sakurai, and Shu Kanematsu composed the music.

The series aired on Tokyo MX, BS11, MBS, AT-X, J Tele, and other channels from April 5 to June 21, 2020. (Note: Episodes were released every Sunday at 12:00 a.m. JST on Netflix Japan and d Anime Store, an hour and 30 minutes before the original air time on Tokyo MX and BS11.) Angela performed the series' opening theme song "Otome no Route wa Hitotsu Janai!" (乙女のルートはひとつじゃない！; "There's More Than Just One Route For a Maiden!"), while Shouta Aoi performed the series' ending theme song "Bad End". Crunchyroll streamed the series with subtitles. On May 15, 2020, Crunchyroll announced the series would receive an English dub, which premiered the following day. Muse Communication has licensed the series in Southeast Asian territories and released via Animax Asia.

A second season aired from July 3 to September 18, 2021, on the Super Animeism programming block on MBS, TBS and their affiliates, as well as BS Asahi. (Note: MBS listed the season premiere at 25:25 on July 2, 2021, which is July 3 at 1:25 am.) Angela performed the second season's opening theme song "Andante ni Koi o Shite!" (アンダンテに恋をして！; "Fall in Love at Andante!"), while Shouta Aoi performed the second season's ending theme song "give me ♡ me." An OVA was bundled with the special edition of manga's seventh volume, which was released on September 30, 2021. After the conclusion of the second season, it was announced that the series would receive an anime film. The film's title was revealed in April 2022; it premiered in Japan on December 8, 2023.

On May 18, 2021, it was announced that Sentai Filmworks had acquired the home video distribution rights.

==== Episodes ====
===== Season 1 =====
No. overall	No. in season	Title (Note: All English titles are taken from Crunchyroll.)	Directed by (Note: Information is taken from the ending credits of each episode.)	Written by	Storyboarded by	Original release date
1	1	"I Recalled the Memories of My Past Life..."; Transliteration: "Zense no Kioku o Omoidashite Shimatta..." (Japanese: 前世の記憶を思い出してしまった...)	Keisuke Inoue	Megumi Shimizu	Keisuke Inoue	April 5, 2020
Catarina Claes, a young noble girl, one day bangs her head and recalls lost memories from her past life, in which she was an otaku who had been killed in a traffic accident after staying up all night to play an otome game known as Fortune Lover. After inadvertently entering an engagement with the young prince Geordo Stuart, Catarina realizes that she is in the world of Fortune Lover itself, reincarnated as the villainess who is doomed to either exile or death regardless of the routes the player take in the original game. As Catarina begins taking up magic and farming as countermeasures to avoid a "doom flag", she acts friendly towards her new adopted younger brother Keith to keep him from becoming lonely. Catarina tries to get Keith to teach her golem magic, but ends up getting herself injured, leading Keith to feel guilty, attempting to isolate himself in his room. However, Catarina goes as far as chopping down his bedroom door with an axe to reach him. Unfortunately for her, her mother finds out about the broken door and drags Catarina away to scold her with Keith looking on with a warm smile.
2	2	"A Prince Challenged Me to a Fight..."; Transliteration: "Ōji ni Shōbu o Idomarete Shimatta..." (Japanese: 王子に勝負を挑まれてしまった...)	Junya Koshiba	Megumi Shimizu	Mirai Minato	April 12, 2020
Catarina is invited to a tea party where she meets Mary Hunt, a shy young girl whom she asks for advice on growing her vegetables. As the two become friends, Catarina unintentionally uses a line from Fortune Lover that Mary's fiancé, Geordo's brother Alan, was originally supposed to say to her. This causes Mary to pay more attention to Catarina. The next day, Alan visits the Claes household and accuses Catarina of seducing Mary, challenging her to a tree climbing contest as chosen by Catarina. However, he loses every time as Catarina's previous otaku incarnation was an excellent tree climber. To change the tides, as well as wanting the matches to end so as not be found out by her mother, Catarina suggests a musical competition in which she is blown away when she hears Alan play the piano. Praising his skills, Alan becomes upset when Geordo makes a comment and runs off. As Alan feels inferior compared to Geordo, Catarina, noticing his talent with the piano, shows him that even Geordo has things he's bad at, and that Alan should be proud of his own individuality and strengths, causing Alan's heart to begin healing.
3	3	"I Met a Beautiful Brother and Sister..."; Transliteration: "Uruwashi no Bikei Kyōdai to Deatte Shimatta..." (Japanese: 麗しの美形兄妹と出会ってしまった...)	Yamato Ōuchi	Megumu Sasano	Kōji Sawai	April 19, 2020
At a tea party hosted by Geordo and Alan, Catarina comes to the aid of the beautiful Sophia Ascart, finding she has read one of her favorite romance novels. Thrilled to have found a companion to share her love for reading, Catarina quickly befriends the timid girl. Coming over to Catarina's house alongside her brother Nicol, another love interest from Fortune Lover, Sophia is delighted when Catarina compliments her appearance, which is often insulted by others, and asks to be her friend. Catarina then spends the day at Sophia's house, where she meets the siblings' parents and learns about some of Nicol's charms. Noticing Nicol's love for his family, something overlooked by others, Catarina delightfully praises it, causing Nicol to open up to her and genuinely smile for the first time. Seven years later, as Catarina turns 15 years old, she prepares to enter the magic academy, where the main story of Fortune Lover begins.
4	4	"I Enrolled in the Magic Academy..."; Transliteration: "Mahō Gakuen ni Nyūgaku Shite Shimatta..." (Japanese: 魔法学園に入学してしまった...)	Keisuke Inoue	Megumi Shimizu	Yūichi Nihei	April 26, 2020
Upon enrolling at the magic academy, where Fortune Lover is set, Catarina becomes concerned about Maria Campbell, the main heroine of the game, who is allegedly already forming relationships with the boys. As Catarina spends time at the student council and gets to know Maria, she steps in to protect her from some bullies when Maria brings in sweets she had made herself. Catarina later realizes that in the original game, it was she who bullied Maria and Geordo who comes to Maria's rescue which is what begins their romance route. However, since Catarina inadvertently stole Geordo's event, it seems the route is taking a unique, unexpected turn.
5	5	"I Visited the Heroine's Parents' House..."; Transliteration: "Shujinkō no Jikka ni Ojama Shite Shimatta..." (Japanese: 主人公の実家にお邪魔してしまった...)	Hidehiko Kadota	Megumi Shimizu	Kōji Sawai	May 3, 2020
While seeking to become closer with Maria, Catarina once again saves her from being bullied. As a result, she unintentionally steals a major romantic scene from Keith. While visiting a farm on her day off with Keith, Catarina decides to visit Maria's hometown, where she meets Maria's mother. Remembering how Maria experienced severe loneliness in her childhood due to false rumors about being a noble's illegitimate child, her mother is relieved to find that she has found a true friend in Catarina. Catarina's mother, on the other hand, is less than pleased to see Catarina after finding out she had secretly been running a farm at school and prepares to scold her, much to Catarina's dismay.
6	6	"I Had Fun Over Summer Vacation..."; Transliteration: "Natsuyasumi da Kara Tanoshiku Asonde Shimatta..." (Japanese: 夏休みだから楽しく遊んでしまった...)	Junya Koshiba	Megumi Shimizu	Katsuyuki Kodera	May 10, 2020
During summer vacation, Geordo plans to take Catarina with him to the lake for a date, but Catarina, misunderstanding the situation, ends up inviting everyone else along too. Later, Catarina goes shopping with Sophia and Nicol, where Catarina is taken aback by Nicol's sudden advance. Afterwards, Catarina joins Mary in attending a piano recital by Alan in which it is hinted that Alan has feelings towards Catarina which he is oblivious about due to Mary's interference. Catarina then tries to finish her summer homework before school resumes as she has left everything for the last day of vacation. As she falls asleep that night, she has memories of a friend she spoke to in her previous life.
7	7	"I Entered a Dangerous Dungeon..."; Transliteration: "Kiken na Danjon ni Haitte Shimatta..." (Japanese: 危険なダンジョンに入ってしまった...)	Yamato Ōuchi	Megumi Shimizu	Kōji Sawai	May 17, 2020
Sophia has a dream about Catarina's friend in the real world, Atsuko Sasaki, who was very saddened by Catarina's sudden death, thus she made a wish that when it was her turn to die, she would like to live her next life again as Catarina's friend. Meanwhile, as part of their practical exams, everyone is tasked with entering a dangerous dungeon for a magic stone, with Catarina on a team with Geordo, Keith, and Sophia. During the chaos of one of the dungeon's traps, which Catarina sets off by accident, Catarina ends up falling down into a hidden passage, where she unknowingly finds the magic stone while harvesting mushrooms. Guided by Nicol's wind magic, Sophia comes to Catarina's rescue when she almost falls off a cliffside, upon which they are both saved by a mysterious whirlwind. As the rest of the group joins them, Maria notices a dark presence clinging to Catarina
8	8	"I Became Engulfed by Desire..."; Transliteration: "Yokubō ni Mamirete Shimatta..." (Japanese: 欲望にまみれてしまった...)	Michiru Itabisashi	Megumu Sasano	Kagetsu Aizawa	May 24, 2020
While studying in the library, Catarina and several others get sucked inside a magic book. Mary and Maria, who witness everything, try to figure out how to rescue everyone and find that the only way to free them is to let one of them fulfill their desires within the book world. Unfortunately, Mary is unable to let them play out their stories to the end since they all involve everyone hitting on Catarina. Realizing that none of the stories have involved Catarina's desire, the two let a scenario play out in which Catarina gets to eat as many sweets as she wants, a desire that proves too much for the book to contain, which frees everyone as a result. In the aftermath, Alan, whose story was the only one not read as a result of Mary not wanting him to realize his feelings, finds Catarina playing outside and joins her. They share an intimate moment as they sit atop a tree to look at the sunset, but it is cut short when Mary finds them and runs towards them to prevent anything from happening.
9	9	"Things Got Crazy at a Slumber Party..."; Transliteration: "Pajama Pāti de Moriagatte Shimatta..." (Japanese: パジャマパーティで盛り上がってしまった...)	Hidehiko Kadota	Megumu Sasano	Yūichi Nihei	May 31, 2020
As Catarina and the girls hold a slumber party to celebrate passing their exams, her maid, Anne Shelley, notices everyone's feelings towards Catarina that Catarina herself is oblivious of. A flashback reveals how Anne, the daughter of baron and his maid, was scarred in a fire that took her mother's life and was deemed unfit for marriage by her father. Upon joining the Claes family, she originally tried to act as merely a tool until Catarina's personality changed following her accident, after which she learned to be herself thanks to Catarina's kindness. When Anne's father tried to marry her off, Catarina stood up to him and convinced him to call the marriage off and let Anne stay by her side. On another day, Geordo has high expectations upon receiving a fancy invitation from Catarina, only to discover she had invited everyone to help harvest her crops. Afterwards, Catarina is confronted by someone who claims she will expose her evil deeds.
10	10	"The Moment of My Doom Arrived... Part 1"; Transliteration: "Hametsu no Toki ga Otozurete Shimatta... Zenpen" (Japanese: 破滅の時が訪れてしまった...前編)	Hyottokosai Ichimuan	Megumu Sasano	Kōji Sawai	June 7, 2020
Mimicking the judgment event from the game, Catarina is accused of bullying Maria, but Maria and the others vouch for her innocence. Although Catarina is relieved that she has evaded a major doom flag, Maria goes missing after investigating a dark aura coming off the instigators. Three days later, Geordo discovers that the list of "evidence" the instigators used against Catarina was not actually written by them, and that they themselves have no memory as to why they accused her. He suspects that they were being manipulated by dark magic, with Maria's ability to detect it leading to her capture. That night, Catarina has a dream where all of her friends die and is unable to sleep. Fatigued the next morning, she takes a rest at the infirmary. As she walks back to class, Catarina sits down on a bench and reminisces her first time meeting Maria. However, she is interrupted by Sirius Dieke, the student council president. Recalling what Atsuko said in her past life about a hidden character from the game who possessed dark magic, Catarina soon realizes that the true culprit is Sirius, who declares his hatred for Catarina and puts her into a slumber.
11	11	"The Moment of My Doom Arrived... Part 2"; Transliteration: "Hametsu no Toki ga Otozurete Shimatta... Kōhen" (Japanese: 破滅の時が訪れてしまった...後編)	Keisuke Inoue	Megumi Shimizu	Keisuke Inoue	June 14, 2020
While remaining unconscious, Catarina's mind is trapped in a world resembling her previous life as an otaku. Realizing that she could die if she remains in an eternal sleep, everyone tries their best to find ways to wake up Catarina to no avail. As Geordo and the others lament on how they feel about Catarina, Sophia, who is revealed to be Atsuko's reincarnation, hears her voice and goes to Catarina's side so Atsuko can reach her inside the dream world and guide her back to the world she belongs to. Going off Atsuko's parting words, Catarina learns where Maria is located and goes with the others to rescue her and confront Sirius.
12	12	"The Final Event Has Begun..."; Transliteration: "Saishū Ibento ga Kite Shimatta..." (Japanese: 最終イベントが来てしまった...)	Kagetsu Aizawa	Megumi Shimizu	Mirai Minato	June 21, 2020
Sirius, whose real name is revealed to be Raphael Walt, explains how Marchioness Dieke had a mage kill his mother to acquire dark magic to do a ritual to transfer the real Sirius' mind and memories into Raphael's body. She then murdered the mage to keep him quiet. Gaining dark magic alongside Sirius' memories while still retaining his own, Raphael swore vengeance. Reminded of his mother's kindness thanks to Catarina's help, Raphael learns that the true dark magic was the mage that possessed him following his death and finally manages to drive him out. Afterwards, Raphael leaves the school to atone for his sins while Marchioness Dieke is brought to justice. At the second year graduation party, the setting of the final event of the game where Maria is supposed to confess to one of the romance interests, Catarina finds herself greeted with what she believes to be a friendship ending, remaining oblivious that she is actually the focus of a reverse harem ending. With Raphael joining the Department of Magic and becoming another one of Catarina's admirers, Catarina looks forward to a life that goes beyond what is covered in Fortune Lover.

===== Season 2: X =====
No. overall	No. in season	Title	Directed by	Written by	Storyboarded by	Original release date
13	1	"I Avoided My Doom Flags, So I Got Carried Away at the Cultural Festival..."; Transliteration: "Hametsu Furagu o Kaihi Shita no de Bunkasai de Ukarete Shimatta..." (Japanese: 破滅フラグを回避したので文化祭で浮かれてしまった...)	Keisuke Inoue	Megumi Shimizu	Keisuke Inoue	July 3, 2021
Catarina is excited she avoided her doom flags. While she is gardening, a flashback shows how she was able to accomplish this. Sometime later, Geordo informs her of the school festival before he is confronted by a jealous Keith. Afterwards, Catarina meets up with everyone in preparation for it. On the day of the festival, Catarina is enjoying herself. During this time, she misinterprets Keith and Mary's argument as them secretly having feelings for each other, receives a love confession from Nicol disguised as a rehearsal of Sophia's play, and Maria asks her to join the Department of Magic. Finally, while Catarina is hanging out with Geordo and Alan, she meets their brothers Geoffrey and Ian as well as their respective fiancées, Susanna Randall and Selena Burke. Geordo is then informed of a troubling situation.
14	2	"I Turned Into a Villain..." (Note: In the episode, it is titled "I Turned Into a Villainess..."); Transliteration: "Akuyaku ni Natte Shimatta..." (Japanese: 悪役になってしまった...)	Junya Koshiba	Megumu Sasano	Masayoshi Nishida	July 10, 2021 (Note: This episode aired at 1:40 a.m. JST, 15 minutes after the original air time.)
When one of the actresses in Sophia's play is unable to act due to injury, Catarina reluctantly agrees to take over. Sophia's play, which is similar to the story of Cinderella, has Maria as Cinderella, Mary and Catarina as the wicked stepsisters, Geordo as the Prince and Keith as a villager who's friends with Cinderella. During the play, Catarina loses the script she hid in her fan so she improvises by acting as a villainess, which impresses the audience. Inspired by Catarina's performance, Sophia adds a new character for the play, the Masked Thief played by Nicol. However, a jealous Geordo and Keith duel with Nicol due to the latter's role of kidnapping Catarina's character during the ball scene. With some quick thinking, Catarina explains to the audience the fight was part of her character's plan to win the attention of the Prince. In the end, Sophia's play becomes a success with many of the actors thanking Catarina for saving it. Later that night, Catarina heads to a party to celebrate the end of the festival but is suddenly drugged and kidnapped.
15	3	"I Was Captured..."; Transliteration: "Toraware no Mi ni Natte Shimatta..." (Japanese: 囚われの身になってしまった...)	Chihiro Kumano	Megumi Shimizu	Kagetsu Aizawa	July 17, 2021
Geordo receives a ransom letter demanding he renounced his right to the throne. Meanwhile, Catarina wakes up in an unknown mansion and learns her kidnappers are Selena, her butler Rufus, and maid Lana. While Catarina is treated well as a hostage, every time she asks Selena why did she kidnap her, Rufus dissuades Selena. Elsewhere, Catarina's friends conclude another dark mage is behind the kidnapping. Later that night, Selena meets with Catarina and explains that due to her insecurities and Ian acting cold to her, Selena started to believe rumors that he hates her, so she came up with the kidnapping to help Ian's chances of becoming king as a final act of love to him before she turns herself in to the authorities. Catarina tells Selena she does not blame her and she should not trust rumors and ask Ian himself if he does love her. Touched by her kindness, Selena decides to release Catarina, but is put under a sleeping spell by Rufus, who reveals himself as the true mastermind as he wants Selena to be the scapegoat for his plans to make Ian, Geordo, and Catarina disappear.
16	4	"I Had a Friendly Tea Time With an Attractive Butler..."; Transliteration: "Iroppoi Shitsuji to Nakayoku Ocha o Shite Shimatta..." (Japanese: 色っぽい執事と仲良くお茶をしてしまった...)	Keisuke Inoue	Keisuke Inoue	Keisuke Inoue	July 24, 2021 (Note: This episode aired at 1:35 am. JST, 10 minutes after the original air time.)
Rufus reveals his master, David Mason, wants Geoffrey to become king. He is flabbergasted and amused that not only is Catarina not afraid of him but finds his life as a spy cool. As they get to know each other, Rufus reveals he was sold into slavery as a child for stealing and was bought by Mason. Rufus also remembers his past as a nameless orphan living in the slums before being adopted by a kind mage who gave him the name Sora before he was captured for trying to steal medicine for his dying guardian. When Rufus learns Mason's plot has been exposed, he accepts his upcoming fate to be arrested by the authorities led by Lana, who is actually Larna Smith, the head of the Department of Magic and Raphael's boss, but not before making a promise to travel with Catarina to other countries if they ever meet again. Ian is reunited with Selena and reveals he does love her and he apologies. Catarina is reunited with her friends, who freak out when they discovered Rufus gave Catarina a hickey without her realizing it. To make Catarina realize his feelings, Geordo kisses her much to everyone's shock.
17	5	"Love for the Younger Brothers Poured Forth..."; Transliteration: "Otōto-tachi e no Ai ga Afurete Shimatta..." (Japanese: 弟たちへの愛が溢れてしまった...)	Michiru Itabisashi	Megumi Shimizu	Kōji Sawai	July 31, 2021 (Note: This episode aired at 2:00 am. JST, 35 minutes after the original air time.)
Catarina dismisses Geordo's kiss as a dream while her friends become overprotective to prevent Geordo from seeing her. Meanwhile, Larna is revealed to be Susanna, who is a master of disguise. The Stuart brothers talk about their past where Alan, who was sick as a child, had to be cared by their mother while the others were raised by servants. As a result, Geordo became cold and indifferent as their mother was not there for him while Alan grew insecure and resentful due to everyone always comparing him to Geordo. But thanks to Catarina's influence, she help mend the relationship between Geordo and Alan. When a succession crisis made their father the new king, the Stuart brothers became targets of opportunistic nobles who wanted one of them to become the next king. Ironically, despite what the nobles think, the brothers care for each other in their own way and are not rivals for the throne. Later, Catarina meets Geordo again with the latter kissing her again to prove what happened was not a dream, which makes her realize Geordo really loves her.
18	6	"I Had a Summer Adventure..."; Transliteration: "Hito Natsu no Bōken o Shite Shimatta..." (Japanese: ひと夏の冒険をしてしまった...)	Kōki Onoue	Megumi Shimizu	Masayoshi Nishida	August 7, 2021
Geordo invites Catarina to his family vacation home during summer vacation, but much to his annoyance, Alan has also invited their friends over as well. Despite being aware of Geordo's feelings, Catarina admits she does not feel the same way and does not want to marry into the royal family since it would mean the end of her carefree lifestyle. Hearing her worries, Maria suggests Catarina should join her at the Department of Magic. As they stay inside a cottage while it rains, Catarina, Mary, and Sophia tells Maria about their childhood when they first stay at the Stuarts' vacation home. While searching for a ghost at a nearby forest, Catarina, Mary, Sophia, and their maids headed inside the cottage while waiting for a thunderstorm to end. With Catarina's help, Sophia was able to overcome her fear of thunder using her imagination. Later that night, the children learned the so called ghost in the forest was actually Catarina's mother scolding her daughter for climbing up trees again. Back in the present, the girls show Maria the beautiful scenery of the forest after the rain stops. Catarina and her friends then watch the fireworks from the balcony.
19	7	"My Wish Was Granted..."; Transliteration: "Negai ga Kanatte Shimatta..." (Japanese: 願いが叶ってしまった...)	Toshiyuki Sone	Megumu Sasano	Mirai Minato	August 14, 2021
Raphael is at the Department of Magic where he complains to Sora about the work environment. He then reminisces when Larna took him under her wing. The next day, Catarina and her friends arrive there. Inside, Larna shows them a wish-granting dollhouse. While she is away, the dollhouse activates itself when Catarina opens the door. Larna, Raphael, Sora, and Anne observe Alan, Nicol, Sophia, and Geordo's dreams where they want to be with Catarina while they are a bird, cat, fairy, and pirate, respectively. Meanwhile, Catarina dreams about doing nothing. Raphael and Anne then decide to find the doll that controls the dollhouse and rescue everyone. When they split up, Anne observes Maria wanting to have bulging muscles, Mary wanting to take Catarina away from Geordo while being of a higher rank than him, and Keith wanting everyone to be genderswapped. When Anne finally finds Catarina, they go looking for Raphael, only to find that he does not want to leave. When Catarina gets through to him, they are confronted by the doll, which is ultimately defeated by Catarina. Once everyone is set free, Anne prevents Catarina from learning about the dreams they had.
20	8	"I Had an Arranged Marriage Meeting..."; Transliteration: "Omiai Shite Shimatta..." (Japanese: お見合いしてしまった...)	Shuntarō Tozawa	Megumu Sasano	Shuntarō Tozawa	August 21, 2021
After giving it much thought, Nicol agrees to participate in an arranged marriage meeting as a way to move on from Catarina. Meanwhile at the Magic Academy, Fray Randall has a conversation with her friend, Ginger Tucker. Just then, Catarina arrives and Ginger acts like a tsundere towards her. Back at Nicol's mansion, Nicol spends several days interacting with the candidates. When he meets with Fray, she admits to him that she is not interested in getting engaged. While they are taking a walk, Fray reveals she wants work at the Department of Magic due to her admiration for Larna. She then tells him that he should be honest with himself concerning Catarina since she has not reciprocated Geordo's feelings despite their engagement, which is similar to the advice he previously received from Raphael. Afterwards, Fray tells Ginger what happened. Later that night, Sophia scolds Nicol for participating in the meeting, revealing their mother was once engaged to another man before she met and married their father, much to his surprise. Following Raphael and Fray's advice, Nicol makes an effort to spend more time with Catarina.
21	9	"Keith Disappeared... Part 1"; Transliteration: "Kīsu ga Inaku Natte Shimatta... (Zenpen)" (Japanese: キースがいなくなってしまった...（前編）)	Yūsuke Onoda	Megumi Shimizu	Kōji Sawai	August 28, 2021 (Note: This episode aired at 1:30 am. JST, 5 minutes after the original air time.)
Catarina and Keith run into their friends while they are hanging out together. Once they are finally alone again, she admits to him that she is not really interested in marrying Geordo. A few days later, Catarina's mother gives her a letter from Keith claiming that he has run away. As such, Catarina vows to find him and apologize. Just as she about leave, Geordo has her see Larna first. At the Department of Magic, Catarina receives a teddy bear Larna made for Geoffrey named Alexander, which is capable of locating people. Afterwards, Catarina, Geordo, Maria, Larna, and Sora begin searching for Keith. While taking a break, Larna reveals to Catarina how she became interested in magic before they continue on. Meanwhile, a kidnapped Keith recalls being approached by a woman he recognized. He is then confronted by his older brother, Thomas Coleman, and a mysterious young girl.
22	10	"Keith Disappeared... Part 2"; Transliteration: "Kīsu ga Inaku Natte Shimatta... (Chūhen)" (Japanese: キースがいなくなってしまった...（中編）)	Chihiro Kumano	Megumu Sasano	Yūichi Nihei	September 4, 2021
Catarina, Geordo, Maria, Larna, and Sora decide to spend the night at an inn. Later that night, while Catarina and Maria are having a conversation, Larna contacts Raphael about the investigation into Keith's disappearance. The next day, the group continues the search. Meanwhile, Keith is again confronted by the young girl, who reveals that she is going use him as a test subject for dark magic. Back at the inn, Geordo attempts to comfort Catarina, but he is interrupted by Sora. The group then heads to Noir where they split up. When they get back together, Maria notices the young girl walking in an alley. Larna later informs everyone that Keith was actually kidnapped when his birth mother was manipulated by dark magic into handing him over to someone else. She also tells them that they will be heading to a mansion on the outskirts of town first thing in the morning.
23	11	"Keith Disappeared... Part 3"; Transliteration: "Kīsu ga Inaku Natte Shimatta... (Kōhen)" (Japanese: キースがいなくなってしまった...（後編）)	Keisuke Inoue	Megumi Shimizu	Keisuke Inoue	September 11, 2021
The next morning, the group heads to the mansion where they notice it is heavily guarded. Sora creates a distraction allowing them to sneak in. Once Sora, Geordo, and Larna defeat the guards, the group finds a mortally wounded Thomas. They then notice a secret room where Keith is being held. However, he is engulfed by a large aura of dark magic. When a distraught Catarina approaches him, an item Geordo bought her activates, allowing her to save Keith. When he awakens, he kisses Catarina. Afterwards, she gains a dark familiar in the form of a dog. This is immediately followed by Catarina and Geordo being confronted by the young girl, who tells them that they will meet each other again someday. The group soon heads home. Sometime later, when Catarina and Keith have a conversation, he confesses his love for her before they are joined by their friends.
24	12	"My Graduation Ceremony Happened..."; Transliteration: "Sotsugyōshiki ga Yatte Kite Shimatta..." (Japanese: 卒業式がやって来てしまった...)	Junya Koshiba	Megumi Shimizu	Mirai Minato	September 18, 2021
Susanna informs Geoffrey that the real culprit behind Keith's kidnapping was a young girl named Sarah. She also informs him of Sarah's potential ties to the Dieke family and how Catarina was able to save Keith. Meanwhile, Catarina and her friends have graduated from the Magic Academy. Afterwards, Catarina enjoys herself at the ceremony before she heads off to a party and a girls' night in. At the party, Catarina has fun with her friends. Later that night, she meets up with Keith, who once again confesses his love for her. She then has a conversation with Mary, Sophia, and Maria during the girls' night in. While she is asleep, Catarina has a dream about Atsuko where she learns about Fortune Lover II. After tending to the garden with her friends, Catarina and Maria head to the Department of Magic. There, they meet Cyrus Lanchester and Dewey Percy. Catarina is shocked as she saw them in her dream.
25	13 (OVA)	"I Met My Destined One..."; Transliteration: "Unmei no Hito ni Deatte Shimatta..." (Japanese: 運命の人に出会ってしまった...)	Michiru Itabisashi	Megumi Shimizu	Shuntarō Tozawa	September 30, 2021
Geordo, Keith, Mary, Alan, Sophia, and Nicol reminisce about their first meeting with Catarina.

=== Video games ===
Bonus DVDs containing demo versions of Fortune Lover, the in-universe otome game, were included in the limited editions of the anime's first season Blu-ray releases. A free-to-play mobile game titled Katarina's Farm (カタリナ農園, Katarina Nōen) was released on July 31, 2020, with an online trial version being made available from June 19 to August 31, 2020. A game for the Nintendo Switch titled My Next Life as a Villainess: All Routes Lead to Doom! Pirates of the Disturbance was released on December 23, 2021. The game has an original story that takes place beyond Fortune Lover's final graduation event, showing Catarina having evaded all the doom flags only to face a new doom flag related to a new meeting and encounter with a pirate. The game was released in English by Idea Factory International on November 28, 2023.

=== Merchandise ===
On September 27, 2020, Premium Bandai began selling book cushions which "feature art of Catarina and her four (main) suitors" from the series, which each cushion folding up like a book, "featuring the character's name on the outside."

== Reception ==
The light novel and manga have over 600,000 copies in print. The manga adaptation was ranked 4th in the 2019 Next Manga Awards in the print category.

Some reviewers have described the anime series as focusing around Catarina Claes, who amasses a polyamorous, bisexual harem pining for her as she tries to avoid being a villain and becomes very thoughtful. Reviewers pointed out two queer female characters: Mary Hunt and Maria Campbell, all of whom have crushes on Catarina, as reviewer James Beckett of Anime News Network pointed out.

In May 2020, seven of the 10 spots of a "weekly favourite couple poll" by Anime Trending featured Catarina paired with most of the characters. (Note: Specifically Maria and Catarina, Mary and Catarina, Sophia and Catarina, Keith and Catarina, Gerald and Catarina, Alan and Catarina, Nicole and Catarina.) After the first season ended, with a "friendship ending", one reviewer calling it a "very definitive ending for Catarina and Her Polyamorous Bisexual Harem of Doom," and the series was later praised by Rebecca Silverman and Theron Martin of the Anime News Network for being well-done, and offers "a rewarding bisexual power fantasy" which Catarina is unaware of due to her dense nature.

In a piece for Anime Feminist, Alex Henderson considered the series' "fantasy world [to be] accepting of queer love and queer identity," noting acceptance of female character's crushes on Katarina and the presence of queer romance novels being "seemingly mainstream" in the series' world.

== See also ==
- The 100th Time's the Charm, another light novel series illustrated by Nami Hidaka
