= Yakitori: Soldiers of Misfortune =

Japanese light novel series

- First novel volume cover

ヤキトリ (Yakitori)
- Genre: Science fiction
- Novel series
- Written by: Carlo Zen
- Illustrated by: so-bin
- Published by: Hayakawa Publishing
- Imprint: Hayakawa Bunko JA
- Original run: August 8, 2017 – present
- Volumes: 2
- Original net animation
- Directed by: Hideki Anbo
- Written by: Mitsuyasu Sakai
- Music by: Ken Ishii
- Studio: Arect
- Licensed by: Netflix
- Released: May 18, 2023
- Runtime: 28–45 minutes
- Episodes: 6
- icon

Yakitori: Soldiers of Misfortune (Japanese: ヤキトリ, Hepburn: Yakitori) is a Japanese novel series written by Carlo Zen and illustrated by so-bin. It began publication by Hayakawa Publishing in August 2017.

Licensed by Netflix, an original net animation (ONA) series adaptation by Arect premiered in May 2023.

== Plot ==
Set in a future where Earth and the wider solar system are dominated by powerful alien-led trade federations, which are constantly locked in constant warfare. Humanity exists under the influence of a superior extraterrestrial civilization, and opportunities for advancement are limited. Seeking to escape the constraints of his life in Japan, Akira Ihotsu enlists in an orbital drop infantry unit at the urging of his friend Pupkin, a military cook. These infantry soldiers are notoriously expendable, suffering casualty rates as high as seventy percent, being given the nickname "Yakitori", likening them to skewered meat.

As a member of this unit, Akira is deployed into brutal interplanetary conflicts where survival is uncertain and loyalty is tested. The series follows Akira's experiences on the battlefield and within the ranks of the federation's forces, portraying the cost of ambition in a system that treats soldiers as disposable assets in a vast power struggle.

== Characters ==
Akira Ihotsu (伊保津明, Ihotsu Akira)
Voiced by: Taito Ban (Japanese); Stephen Fu (English)
Japanese member of the K321 Unit known as Yakatori who values his independence but lacks cooperation.
Zi Han Yan (楊紫涵, Yan Zi Han)
Voiced by: Asami Seto (Japanese); Frankie Kevich (English)
Chinese member of the K321 Unit who is calm under pressure and is a good strategist.
Tyron Baxter (タイロンバクスター, Tairon Bakusutā)
Voiced by: Shunsuke Takeuchi (Japanese); Zeno Robinson (English)
American member of the K321 Unit who is good natured and physically very strong.
Erland Martonen (エルランドマルトネン, Erurando Marutonen)
Voiced by: Kengo Kawanishi (Japanese); Alejandro Saab (English)
Swedish member of the K321 Unit who is withdrawn and tries to encourage the others to cooperate.
Amalia Schulz (アマリヤシュルツ, Amariya Shurutsu)
Voiced by: Akari Kitō (Japanese); Cherami Leigh (English)
British member of the K321 Unit who is strong-willed and outspoken, and inclined to act rashly.
Vasha Pupkin (ヴァーシャパプキン, Bāsha Papukin); Russian
Vasya Pupkin
Voiced by: Kenjiro Tsuda (Japanese); Ron Bottitta (English)
Recruiter for the Trade Federation who enlists Akira and known as the "cook".
Rimel (リメル, Rimeru)
Voiced by: Wataru Takagi (Japanese); Patrick Seitz (English)
Bulldog-like commander of a section of the Trade Federation forces.
John Do (ジョン・ドゥ, Jon Dō)
Voiced by: Tetsu Inada
Authoritarian and brutal training commander of Yakatori units who tries to get the K321 Unit to work as a team.
Hatsune Mimi (初音ミミ, Hatsune Mimi)
Voiced by: Saki Fujita
Artificial Intelligence assistant hologram allocated to the K321 Unit.

== Media ==
=== Novel ===
Written by Carlo Zen and illustrated by so-bin, the series began publication by Hayakawa Publishing on August 8, 2017. As of April 2018, two volumes have been released.

==== Volumes ====
No.	Japanese release date	Japanese ISBN
1	August 8, 2017	978-4-15-031280-0
2	April 18, 2018	978-4-15-031318-0

=== Anime ===
An original net animation was announced at AnimeJapan on March 25, 2023. It was produced by Arect and directed by Hideki Anbo, with Mitsuyasu Sakai writing the scripts, Atsushi Yamagata designing the characters, and Ken Ishii composing the music. It premiered on Netflix on May 18, 2023.

==== Episodes ====
No.	Title	Original release date
1	"A Diplomatic Mission"; Transliteration: "Gaikō Ninmu" (Japanese: 外交任務)	May 18, 2023
The disaffected Akira, sick of his boring life on Earth, takes up the offer from his acquaintance, Vasha Pupkin, to enlist in a trade federation orbital drop infantry unit known as Yakitori even though the casualty rate is 70%. He is teamed up with four other recruits to form the K321 unit and are sent on a diplomatic mission as part of an intergalactic force to guard a cat-like special envoy on the planet Barka. They are almost immediately caught up in a battle against the mole-like inhabitants who are rebelling against an unfair financial deal proposed by the trade federation which will exploit their planet.
2	"Counterattack"; Transliteration: "Hangeki" (Japanese: 反撃)	May 18, 2023
The K321 unit is assigned by commander Rimel-bukan to launch a counterattack in an armored transport against a spider tank captured by the rebels. Footage is shown of ten months ago when their unit was formed on Earth before they are transported to a training camp on Mars referred to as the "Kitchen". There they introduce themselves to each other: Japanese Akira Ihotsu, Swedish Erland Martonen, Chinese Zihan Yang, Englishwoman Amalia Schulz and American Tyrone Baxter.
3	"Harassment"; Transliteration: "Harasumento" (Japanese: ハラスメント)	May 18, 2023
After successfully destroying the spider tank, the K321 are assigned to attack and destroy an enemy artillery base. In a flashback to their training period on Mars, it is shown that they were being trained differently from other recruits to fight as a team under the authoritarian John Doe. However, they performed badly because they acted as individuals they lacked effectiveness. Meanwhile, they manage to reach their target, a heavily fortified artillery base.
4	"Atrocity"; Transliteration: "Kyōkō" (Japanese: 凶行)	May 18, 2023
With Mimi's assistance, the K321 gain access to the artillery base and find that it is deserted and that the weapons are being remotely controlled. They call on Rimel to launch orbital strikes from above the planet onto the other three enemy-controlled bases. He obliges with devastating results, destroying huge numbers of native Barkans in the bombardment. In another flashback to the Kitchen, the team are shown developing basic teamwork skills which improves their effectiveness over the usual military memory-implanted trainees. John Doe allows them to graduate and hopefully improve their chances of surviving as Yakatori.
5	"The Rear Guard"; Transliteration: "Shingari" (Japanese: しんがり)	May 18, 2023
Following the success of the orbital strike, the trade federation are able to evacuate the special envoy, but K321 must make their own way back to the main base before the Trade Federation leaves the planet. On their way back, they defeat on spider tank by Akira acting as a decoy while the others launch missiles at it. Surprisingly, they are then rescued by Rimel's marines and taken back in time to join the departing fleet where he declares that they are now considered comrades in arms. However, on returning to the Trade Federation home fleet, the K321 unit is arrested.
6	"Yakitori" (Japanese: ヤキトリ)	May 18, 2023
The K321 unit is scapegoated and arrested for the wholesale destruction of the citizens on Baraka. During their trial, Vasa Pupkin admits that the K321 unit's involvement contributed to the genocide on Barka. However, their dog-like defense attorney argues that because the Yakatori are considered "equipment" and not trained in the rules of engagement, he argues that the cat-like special envoy bears responsibility for the mission on Barka and its consequences and requests a mistrial. The K321 unit is acquitted, but they must undertake training in ethics and morals before being sent back to Barka on another mission, to rescue the mole-like Barkan ambassador and her children from rat-like revolutionaries.

== See also ==
- Blade & Bastard, a light novel series with the same illustrator
- Overlord, a light novel series with the same illustrator
- The Saga of Tanya the Evil, a war themed light novel series with the same author
