= Blade & Bastard =

Japanese light novel series

- First light novel volume cover

ブレイド&バスタード (Bureido & Basutādo)
- Genre: Dark fantasy
- Light novel
- Written by: Kumo Kagyu
- Illustrated by: so-bin
- Published by: Drecom Media
- English publisher: NA: J-Novel Club; Yen Press (print)
- Imprint: DRE Novels
- Original run: December 9, 2022 – present
- Volumes: 6
- Manga
- Written by: Kumo Kagyu
- Illustrated by: Makoto Fugetsu
- Published by: Drecom Media
- English publisher: NA: Yen Press
- Imprint: DRE Comics
- Magazine: DRE Comics
- Original run: June 23, 2023 – present
- Volumes: 9
- Anime television series
- Directed by: Tomoki Kobayashi
- Written by: Naruhisa Arakawa
- Music by: Hayato Matsuo
- Studio: Xingfu
- Licensed by: Sentai Filmworks
- Original run: 2027 – scheduled
- icon

Blade & Bastard (Japanese: ブレイド&バスタード, Hepburn: Bureido & Basutādo) is a Japanese light novel series written by Kumo Kagyu and illustrated by so-bin, based on the role-playing video game series Wizardry. Drecom Media have published six volumes since December 2022 under their DRE Novels imprint. A manga adaptation with art by Makoto Fugetsu has been serialized online via Drecom Media's DRE Comics website since June 2023 and has been collected in nine tankōbon volumes. An anime television series adaptation produced by Xingfu is set to premiere in 2027.

== Plot ==
In the deep and unexplored labyrinth, a place infested with monsters and dangers, a corpse that should not exist is discovered. Iarumas, an adventurer resurrected from the Temple of Resurrection, has completely lost all memory of his previous life and spends his days exploring the dungeon to recover the bodies of fallen adventurers. His goal is to determine whether they can be brought back to life, else they will end up reduced to ashes on the divine altar. Although his skills earn him a certain respect, Iarumas is viewed with suspicion due to his cold and pragmatic attitude, and he lives in isolation, associating almost exclusively with the dead. His existence changes radically when he meets Garbage, a wild young swordswoman and the sole survivor of a massacred group. Together, the two delve deeper into the labyrinth, facing monsters, traps, and the threat of permanent death, searching for clues to Iarumas's past and the truth hidden within the dark maze.

== Characters ==
Iarumas (イアルマス, Iarumasu)
Voiced by: Makoto Furukawa
Garbage (ガーベイジ, Gābeiji)
Voiced by: Tomori Kusunoki
Raraja (ララジャ)
Voiced by: Daiki Yamashita
Ainikki (アイニッキ)
Voiced by: Saori Hayami
Berkanan (ベルカナン, Berukanan)
Voiced by: Shion Wakayama

== Media ==
=== Light novels ===
Written by Kumo Kagyu and illustrated by so-bin, Blade & Bastard began publication under Drecom Media's DRE Novels imprint on December 9, 2022. Six volumes have been released as of March 10, 2026. The series' volumes are simultaneously published digitally in English by J-Novel Club. The volumes are released in print by Yen Press.

| No. | Title | Original release date | North American release date |
|---|---|---|---|
| 1 | Warm Ash, Dusky Dungeon; Hai wa Atatakaku, Meikyū wa Honogurai (灰は暖かく、迷宮は仄暗い) | December 9, 2022; 978-4-434-31101-7 | December 9, 2022 (digital); December 12, 2023 (print); 978-1-7183-9348-6 (digital); 978-1-9753-8975-8 (print) |
| 2 | Wireframe Dungeon & Dragon with Red Dead; Tekkotsu no Shiren-ba, Akakishi no Ryū (鉄骨の試練場、赤き死の竜) | June 9, 2023; 978-4-434-31878-8 | June 9, 2023 (digital); August 20, 2024 (print); 978-1-7183-9350-9 (digital); 978-1-9753-9288-8 (print) |
| 3 | Return of The Hrathnir; Kongōseki no Kishi no Kikan (金剛石の騎士の帰還) | December 8, 2023; 978-4-434-33013-1 | February 16, 2024 (digital); January 21, 2025 (print); 978-1-7183-9352-3 (digital); 979-8-8554-0573-6 (print) |
| 4 | Dungeon Chronicle; Meikyū-gai Bōken Kitan (迷宮街冒険奇譚) | July 10, 2024; 978-4-434-34124-3 | July 10, 2024 (digital); June 10, 2025 (print); 978-1-7183-9354-7 (digital); 979-8-8554-1613-8 (print) |
| 5 | Drag Him High; Yatsu no Shikabane o Hiite Yuke (奴の屍を曳いてゆけ) | June 10, 2025; 978-4-434-35881-4 | October 10, 2025 (digital); May 12, 2026 (print); 978-1-7183-9356-1 (digital); 979-8-8554-3365-4 (print) |
| 6 | Saga of the Unknown Adventurers; Bōkensha-tachi no Gaika (冒険者達の凱歌) | March 10, 2026; 978-4-434-37569-9 | September 8, 2026 (digital); 978-1-7183-9358-5 |

=== Manga ===
A manga adaptation illustrated by Makoto Fugetsu published its "0th" chapter on Drecom Media's DRE Comics website on June 7, 2023. It later began serialization on June 23, 2023. The manga's chapters have been compiled into nine tankōbon volumes as of October 2026. The manga is also licensed by Yen Press.

| No. | Original release date | Original ISBN | North American release date | North American ISBN |
|---|---|---|---|---|
| 1 | October 25, 2023 | 978-4-434-32634-9 | October 15, 2024 | 979-8-8554-0017-5 |
1. "Iarumas, Part I"; 2. "Iarumas, Part II"; 3. "Raraja, Part I"; 4. "Raraja, Part II"; 0. "All-Stars"; Original short story: "At the Tavern before the Adventure"
| 2 | December 22, 2023 | 978-4-434-32637-0 | April 1, 2025 | 979-8-8554-0877-5 |
5. "Raraja, Part III"; 6. "Scale, Part I"; 7. "Scale, Part II"; 8. "Scale, Part III"; Original short story: "Status"
| 3 | May 24, 2024 | 978-4-434-33869-4 | November 25, 2025 | 979-8-8554-1948-1 |
9. "Garbage, Part I"; 10. "Garbage, Part II"; 11. "Garbage, Part III"; 12. "Ainikki"; Intermission: "Wizardry"; Original short story: "A Cot"
| 4 | October 25, 2024 | 978-4-434-34538-8 | June 23, 2026 | 979-8-8554-2061-6 |
13. "Berkanan, Part I"; 14. "Berkanan, Part II"; 15. "The Edge of Town"; Original short story: "Your Entire Party Has Been Slaughtered!"
| 5 | March 19, 2025 | 978-4-434-35419-9 | September 22, 2026 | 979-8-8554-3704-1 |
16. "Dragon Slayer, Part I"; 17. "Dragon Slayer, Part II"; 18. "Adventurer's Inn"; Original short story: "Pointless Talk"
| 6 | June 20, 2025 | 978-4-434-35993-4 | March 23, 2027 | 979-8-8554-4556-5 |
19. "Hawkwind"; 20. "Dungeon and..., Part I"; 21. "Dungeon and..., Part II"; Original short story: "An Unidentified Corpse"
| 7 | October 20, 2025 | 978-4-434-36668-0 | — | — |
22. "Dungeon and..., Part III"; 23. "Dragon, Part I"; 24. "Dragon, Part II"; 25. "Dragon, Part III"; 26. "Dragon, Part IV"; 27. "Dragon, Part V"; 28. "Contra-Dextra Avenue, Part I"; 29. "Contra-Dextra Avenue, Part II"; Intermission: "Camp"; Original short story: "Whispers from the Labyrinth"
| 8 | March 10, 2026 | 978-4-434-37381-7 | — | — |
30. "Broken Item, Part I"; 31. "Broken Item, Part II"; 32. "Broken Item, Part III"; 33. "Golden Key, Part I"; 34. "Golden Key, Part II"; 35. "Golden Key, Part III"; 36. "Golden Key, Part IV"; 37. "Golden Key, Part V"; Intermission: "Drag Him High"; Original short story: "The Golden Box"
| 9 | October 20, 2026 | 978-4-434-38698-5 | — | — |
38. "Golden Key, Part VI"; 39. "Elevator, Part I"; 40. "Elevator, Part II"; 41. "Greater Demon, Part I"; 42. "Greater Demon, Part II"; 43. "Greater Demon, Part III"; 44. "Greater Demon, Part IV"; 45. "Greater Demon, Part V"; Original short story: "The Heavy Armor"

==== Chapters not yet released in tankōbon format ====
46. "Greater Demon, Part VI"

=== Anime ===
An anime adaptation was announced on October 20, 2024. It was later confirmed to be a television series that will be produced by Xingfu and directed by Tomoki Kobayashi, with Naruhisa Arakawa handling series composition, Rina Iwamoto designing the characters, and Hayato Matsuo composing the music. It is set to premiere in 2027. Sentai Filmworks has licensed the series in North America for streaming on Hidive.

== See also ==
- Goblin Slayer, another light novel series by the same author
- Overlord, another light novel series with the same illustrator
- Wizardry, the role-playing video game series which Blade & Bastard is based on
- Yakitori: Soldiers of Misfortune, a novel series with the same illustrator
