= Fantasista Doll =

Japanese anime television series

- Fantasista Doll promotional image. From top (left to right): Madeleine, Sasara, Uzume Uno, Akari, Katia and Shimeji.

ファンタジスタドール (Fantajisuta Dōru)
- Genre: Science fiction
- Created by: Fantasista Doll Project: Toho; Amber Filmworks; Gorō Taniguchi
- Manga

Fantasista Doll Mix
- Illustrated by: Anmi
- Published by: Kadokawa Shoten
- Magazine: Newtype Ace (former); Comptiq
- Original run: April 10, 2013 – present
- Novel series

Fantasista Doll: Osatō to Spice to Nanika Suteki na Mono de Onna no Ko wa Dekiteiru
- Written by: Hiroaki Jinno
- Illustrated by: Anmi
- Original run: April 19, 2013 – July 19, 2013
- Volumes: 14 chapters
- Manga

Fantasista Doll: Prelude Kagami
- Illustrated by: Tomiyaki Kagisora
- Published by: Media Factory
- Magazine: Monthly Comic Alive
- Original run: July 2013 – present
- Manga
- Illustrated by: Mekimeki
- Published by: Kadokawa Shoten
- Magazine: Comp Ace
- Original run: July 2013 – present
- Anime television series
- Directed by: Hisashi Saitō; Toshihito Naka (assistant)
- Written by: Yūko Kakihara; Noboru Kimura
- Music by: Yasuharu Takanashi
- Studio: Hoods Entertainment
- Licensed by: AUS: Madman Entertainment; NA: Sentai Filmworks
- Original network: AT-X, MBS, BS11, Tokyo MX
- Original run: July 7, 2013 – September 28, 2013
- Episodes: 12
- Video game

Fantasista Doll Girls Royale
- Developer: Drecom
- Publisher: Drecom
- Platform: Android, iOS
- Released: September 2, 2013
- Novel

Fantasista Doll Eve
- Written by: Mado Nozaki
- Published by: Hayakawa Publishing
- Published: September 20, 2013
- Novel
- Written by: Akane Mizushima
- Illustrated by: Hiromi Katō (cover); Webisu Daikanyama
- Published by: Fujimi Shobo
- Published: October 19, 2013

Fantasista Doll (ファンタジスタドール, Fantajisuta Dōru) is a Japanese anime television series produced by Hoods Entertainment and directed by Hisashi Saitō. Gorō Taniguchi serves as the creative producer, while the series composition is handled by Noboru Kimura and Yūko Kakihara. The series aired in Japan between July 7 and September 28, 2013. Three manga adaptations are published by Kadokawa Shoten and Media Factory.

== Plot ==
One day, Uzume Uno – a girl who used to be an elite player at card tournaments – is given a curious device which uses special cards to summon artificial intelligence female warriors known as Fantasista Dolls. From this day on, she spends each day spending time with her new friends, while also fighting battles against other card masters, who seek to have their wishes granted by the Mutual Dream Association Group (希望相互扶助委員会, Kibō Sōgo Fujo Iinkai) in exchange for defeating her.

== Characters ==
=== Card club ===
Uzume Uno (鵜野 うずめ, Uno Uzume)
Voiced by: Ayaka Ōhashi
Uzume 14-year-old junior high school student, and the master of five Fantasista Dolls. She is an elite card player who won a card tournament prior to the beginning of the series. At first she was seriously troubled being responsible for five Dolls all of a sudden, although she eventually develops bonds with them and does not hesitate to fight alongside her Dolls in battles.
Kagami Todori (戸取 かがみ, Todori Kagami)
Voiced by: Sachika Misawa
Kagami is Uzume's underclassman and rival. She is the first opponent Uzume faces after she becomes a Doll Master. Kagami joined the Mutual Dream Association Group to search for information on her older brother, who went missing several years ago. However, she eventually comes to believe in Uzume's friendship.
Manai Uzuki (羽月 まない, Uzuki Manai)
Voiced by: Sumire Uesaka
Manai is president of the card club and Uzume's childhood friend who has named the club "Masquerade Curry Upbeat". She is also a Doll Master.

=== Uzume's Dolls ===
Sasara (ささら)
Voiced by: Minami Tsuda
Sasara is the first Fantasista Doll that Uzume meets. Her color is yellow and she is a strong swordsman who often argues with Uzume a lot due to her stubbornness.
Katia (カティア)
Voiced by: Sora Tokui
Katia is a small, blue-haired Fantasista Doll who has unconscious luck. She is childish and careless. Katia becomes friends with Uzume's younger sister, Miko, and eventually hangs out with her when the opportunity rises.
Shimeji (しめじ)
Voiced by: Chinatsu Akasaki
Shimeji is a pink-haired Fantasista Doll. Having been abandoned by her last master, she is sensitive and fragile. Shimeji initially does not believe much in Uzume, thinking that she will abandon them again. However, Shimeji is relieved when Uzume makes a promise that she will never do that.
Akari (小明)
Voiced by: Akiko Hasegawa
Akari is a gothic lolita-wearing Fantasista Doll who attacks using yo-yo. She is expressionless and naive.
Madeleine (マドレーヌ, Madorēnu)
Voiced by: Sayaka Ohara
Madeleine is a tall busty Fantasista Doll who is always ready to help out her master. She also plans out tactics in battles.

=== Mutual Dream Association Group ===
Komachi Seishou (清正 小町, Seishou Komachi)
Voiced by: Kaori Nazuka
Uzume's upperclassman, Komachi is a top fashion model and often gives Uzume advice whenever she is down. She is later revealed to be the chairman of the Mutual Dream Association Group who desires Uzume's cards for some reason. She was the original owner of the Uzume's dolls. She formed the MDAG after her doll, Sonnet, was destroyed in a traffic accident, hoping to use the data from Uzume's dolls to rebuild Sonnet using her personal doll, Proto-Zero (プロトゼロ, Puroto Zero; Voiced by: Kotori Koiwai).
Anne (アンヌ, Annu)
Voiced by: Satomi Akesaka
Anne is a dark-haired spectacled woman who was initially thought to be the director of the MDAG.
Kazunari Kira (吉良 一成, Kira Kazunari)
Voiced by: Yoshitsugu Matsuoka
Kazunari is a man who sought out the MDAG to reunite with his ex-girlfriend, using any means necessary to win.
Umihiro Yamada (山田 海洋, Yamada Umihiro)
Voiced by: Megumi Matsumoto
Umihiro is a young boy from the MDAG.
Miina Rurukawa (瑠々川 みいな, Rurukawa Miina)
Voiced by: Megumi Han
Mina is a girl who saw her dolls as her masters as opposed to their servants.
Kiyoshi Kiyomizu (清水 潔, Kiyomizu Kiyoshi)
Voiced by: Susumu Chiba
Kiyoshi is a rugby player who sought out the MDAG so that people would appreciate rugby as a true sport instead of a way to meet girls.
Rin (リン)
Voiced by: Haruna Ikezawa
Rin is an amateur model who is jealous of Komachi always being ahead of her.
Jun Fujihisa (藤玖 純, Fujihisa Jun)
Voiced by: Natsuki Hanae
Jun is a novice filmmaker who sought out the MDAG to get people to watch his experimental film, that tends to go under-appreciated by the general viewing public.

=== Other characters ===
The Rafflesia Man (ラフレシアの君, Rafureshia no Kimi)
Voiced by: Sōichirō Hoshi
A mysterious man who watches Uzume closely. He is secretly one of the teachers at Uzume's school.
Rinto Mikasa (三笠 凛人, Mikasa Rinto)
Voiced by: Kyousei Tsukui
Rinto is a teacher at Uzume's school who is also Rafflesia's partner.
Miko Uno (鵜野 みこ, Uno Miko)
Voiced by: Yuri Yamaoka
Miko is Uzume's younger sister who befriends Katia, later learning about the other dolls and keeping it a secret.
Mikoto Uno (鵜野 みこと, Uno Mikoto)
Voiced by: Masayo Kurata
Mikoto is Uzume and Miko's mother. She was a former gambler who exceled at poker, initially tricking the Director during their play.
Reika Okazaki (岡崎 れいか, Okazaki Reika)
Voiced by: Mariko Honda
Reika is Uzume's classmate who is often lending her horror DVD.

== Media ==
=== Manga ===
A manga adaptation, illustrated by Anmi and titled Fantasista Doll Mix (ファンタジスタドール Mix), began serialization in volume 20 of Kadokawa Shoten's Newtype Ace magazine sold on April 10, 2013. It was later transferred to Kadokawa Shoten's Comptiq magazine with the September 2013 issue. A spin-off manga, illustrated by Tomiyaki Kagisora and titled Fantasista Doll: Prelude Kagami (ファンタジスタドール ～プレリュードかがみ～, Fantajisuta Dōru: Pureryūdo Kagami), began serialization in the July 2013 issue of Media Factory's Monthly Comic Alive magazine. A third manga, illustrated by Mekimeki and titled Fantasista Doll, began serialization in the July 2013 issue of Kadokawa Shoten's Comp Ace magazine.

=== Novels ===
A web novel titled Fantasista Doll: Osatō to Spice to Nanika Suteki na Mono de Onna-no-ko wa Dekiteiru (ファンタジスタドール お砂糖とスパイスと何か素敵なもので女の子はできている, Fantajisuta Dōru: Osatō to Supaisu to Nanika Suteki na Mono de Onna-no-ko wa Dekiteiru; Fantasista Doll: Something that the Girl Can Do with Some Sugar and Spice), written by Hiroaki Jinno and illustrated by Anmi, was serialized 14 chapters on the official website of the anime series between April 19 and July 19, 2013. A novel titled Fantasista Doll Eve (ファンタジスタドール イブ, Fantajisuta Dōru Ibu), written by Mado Nozaki, was released by Hayakawa Publishing on September 20, 2013. A novel titled Fantasista Doll, written by Akane Mizushima and illustrated by Webisu Daikanyama with the cover illustrated by Hiromi Katō, was published by Fujimi Shobo on October 19, 2013.

=== Anime ===
The 12-episode anime series, produced by Hoods Entertainment, aired between July 7 and September 28, 2013, on MBS and was simulcast by Crunchyroll. The series is directed by Hisashi Saitō and is written by Noboru Kimura and Yūko Kakihara, while Gorō Taniguchi is the creative producer. The original concept is credited to the Fantasista Doll Project. The character designs are by the animation director Hiromi Katō, who adapted the anime designs from Anmi's original designs. The music is composed by Yasuharu Takanashi, and the sound director is Yōta Tsuruoka. The opening theme is "Ima yo! Fantasista Doll" (今よ!ファンタジスタドール, Ima yo! Fantajisuta Dōru; Now! Fantasista Doll) and the ending theme is "Day by Day" – both performed by Ayaka Ōhashi, Minami Tsuda, Sora Tokui, Chinatsu Akasaki, Akiko Hasegawa and Sayaka Ohara. The anime has been licensed by Sentai Filmworks for streaming and home video release in 2014.Anime Network streams the anime online.

==== Episode list ====
No.	Title	Directed by	Written by	Original release date
1	"Eager Uzume: A Suspicious Creeping Shadow?"; Transliteration: "Uzume Uzu-Uzu: Shinobiyoru Ayashii Kage?" (Japanese: うずめうずうず 忍び寄る怪しい影？)	Toshihito Naka	Yūko Kakihara	July 7, 2013
While riding the train to school, Uzume Uno finds a mysterious device slipped into her bag. Later at school, Uzume finds herself running from a supposed stalker whilst also hearing a voice in her head. Wanting to be safe, Uzume makes a contract to become a Fantasista Doll master, bringing forth one of these dolls, Sasara. Just then, another student wielding the same device attacks Uzume using a doll named Kunoichi. Luckily, Uzume manages to use her new cards to allow Sasara to defeat Kunoichi. Upon returning home, Uzume finds she is also in command of four other dolls, Katia, Shimeji, Akari and Madeleine, and must keep them a secret from her family.
2	"Sasara Sarasara: You're My "Master"?"; Transliteration: "Sasara Sarasara Karini mo Mai Masutā?" (Japanese: ささらさらさら 仮にもマイマスター？)	Shigeru Ueda; Katsuya Shigehara	Noboru Kimura	July 14, 2013
Following an argument with Sasara, who wasn't happy with Uzume being dishonest about turning down an invitation by her classmate, Manai Uzuki, Uzume stubbornly states that she wants to stop being the dolls' master and return the cards to where they came. Tracing it back to a seemingly abandoned factory, she is faced with various other dolls tasked with guarding the facility. Overcoming her feud, Uzume manages to work with the dolls to beat back their opponents. Reaching the main office, they find a man known only as Rafflesia, who awards Uzume with various support cards. Whilst heading home, having made up with Sasara and the others, Uzume encounters Manai, who summons out dolls of her own.
3	"The Expedient Errand: Madeleine's Devotion?"; Transliteration: "Sakutto Sakusen Madorēnu no Kenshin?" (Japanese: さくっと作戦 マドレーヌの献身？)	Naruyo Takahashi	Yūko Kakihara	July 21, 2013
After beating back Manai's dolls, Uzume learns she had been brainwashed to attack them. Meanwhile, Uzume gets a little annoyed with Madeleine's insistence on helping out and urges her not to come out as much. Just then, they come across Kazunari Kira, another Doll Master who uses his dolls with little regard for their safety. Thanks to Madeleine's help, they manage to get out of the fight okay by sacrificing one of their support cards, whilst Shimeji helps pick out a seal for Uzume's device.
4	"Jimejime Shimeji: Counter-attack by the Pathetic Prince?"; Transliteration: "Jimejime Shimeji Zan'nen Ōji no Gyakushū?" (Japanese: じめじめしめじ 残念王子の逆襲？)	Tomoaki Koshida	Yūko Kakihara	July 28, 2013
Shimeji recognises one of Kira's dolls as Aloe and is reminded of her previous master who eventually abandoned her. As such, Shimeji starts behaving oddly, not wanting to get close to Uzume out of fear of being abandoned. Just then, the gang once more encounter Kira, who is capturing cards for the Mutual Dream Assurance Group in the hopes of retrieving a keepsake from his long lost love. When Aloe, along with Kira's other dolls, realise the folly of Kira's harsh treatment and announce their resignation, Kira plans to take them all out by having Aloe self-destruct. Aloe decides to sacrifice herself to save the others, but thankfully Uzume manages to use a repair card to restore her. Despite everything, Aloe decides to stay by Kira's side as she feels he wouldn't last without her, whilst Shimeji receives a gift from Uzume.
5	"Work Work Working: Katia's Beginning?"; Transliteration: "Batabata Baito Hajimete no Katia?" (Japanese: ばたばたバイト はじめてのカティア？)	Yoshitaka Nagaoka	Noboru Kimura	August 4, 2013
Agreeing to join Manai's card club, Uzume discovers the girl that previously attacked her, Kagami Totori, is also a member. Kagami acts coldly towards her, but becomes less so after returning the Kunoichi card she had won earlier. After Uzume decides to ban the dolls from having snacks due to the damage it does on her wallet, the dolls decide to take up part time jobs, with Katia taking up a delivery job. Whilst trying to find her way, Katia meets Uzume's little sister, Miko, who helps show her the way, winding up being interviewed on a TV broadcast. This catches the attention of a boy named Yamada, who attempts to attack Katia with his own dolls, but ends up falling prey to Katia's unconscious luck ability. As Katia and Miko manage to find the recipient of their delivery just in time, Kagami confronts Yamada and beats his dolls, telling the MDAG that she intends to take on Uzume herself. With Katia eventually disappearing due to the time limit on her materialisation, she makes a pinky promise with Miko that they'll meet again.
6	"Akari Karikari: Restrictions and Devotion?"; Transliteration: "Akari Karikari Kōsoku to Kenshin?" (Japanese: 小明かりかり 拘束と献身？)	Nanako Shimazaki	Sadayuki Murai	August 18, 2013
As Uzume takes everyone out after inadvertently waking up early on a Sunday, Akari worries about getting too close to her in the event that they be abandoned again. They soon meet a girl named Miina Rurukawa who acts like a doll, with her actual dolls acting as her masters. Later that night, Miko ends up discovering Uzume's dolls, but is too happy to see Katia to bother blabbing about it. The next day, Uzume meets Miina again, who explains why she chose to become a doll. Meanwhile, Miina's dolls come to Uzume's device to ask Akari to be one of her dolls. When it comes to her time to answer, Akari declines her offer, saying she likes her current master. Although Miina initially accepts the declination with grace, she is soon commanded by the organization to attack her with the offer of healing her scarred arm, which she believed to cause her mother to abandon her. Through her battle, Uzume and her dolls shows what it truly means to be devoted to each other, eventually exposing Miina's bandaged arm as just for show. Miina's dolls decide to give up being masters and instead be her friends, whilst Akari becomes more friendly with Uzume.
7	"A Heart Tart? All Together As One"; Transliteration: "Kokoro Kororo? Awasete Hitotsu" (Japanese: 心ころころ？ あわせてひとつ)	Shigeru Ueda; Katsuya Shigehara	Kiyoko Yoshimura	August 25, 2013
On her way home from school, Uzume is challenged by another member of the MDAG named Kiyoshi Kiyomizu, who overwhelms her dolls with his team's rugby formation, but she is aided by Manai and Kagami, who force Kiyoshi to retreat. Rafflesia gives Uzume a card that brings forth a special technique when master and dolls work together as one, but it appears to only summon random objects upon scanning. As Uzume trains them to work cooperatively, the objects soon take the form of pieces of a cannon, though they can't figure out how to use them, with Sasara placing the blame on Uzume. Downhearted, Uzume is approached by her friend, Komachi Seishou, who encourages her to think of what she can do for her friends. As Uzume is once again challenged by Kiyoshi, she decides to help protect her friends just like they protect her, which serves to be the key to mastering the technique, the Friendship Cannon, which breaks through Kiyoshi's defenses. Just then, they are attacked by another doll master, believed to be the MDAG's director, who takes everyone by surprise with her witch doll, Proto-Zero, before taking her leave.
8	"Onion On On: A Cultural Festival?"; Transliteration: "Tamanegi Tamatama - Bunka no Matsuri?" (Japanese: 玉ねぎたまたま 文化の祭り？)	Toshihito Naka	Tomoko Shinozuka; Sadayuki Murai	September 1, 2013
It is time for the culture festival, with many members of the MDAG looking to target Uzume for her cards. Among these are Rin, a ditzy fashion model who keeps placing second behind Komachi, and Jun, a director who is scorned when his experimental film isn't received well. During the festival, Kagami, who had been looking after Miko after she got separated from Katia, becomes worried when she loses sight of her. Hearing a PA announcement from Rin calling Uzume to meet her, Kagami goes herself and quickly beats all of Rin's dolls. As Uzume arrives after they have all left, she is confronted by Jun and his dolls, but she manages to beat them back with a shower of onions. Despite his defeat and the backfiring of trying to get several people to watch his movie, he finds comfort in the fact Miko enjoyed it. As the day comes close to an end, Uzume and Kagami become more friendly with each other.
9	"Kagami Kami Kami? Confusing Feelings"; Transliteration: "Kagami Kami Kami? Magireru Kimochi" (Japanese: かがみかみかみ？ まぎれる気持ち)	Naruyo Takahashi; Nanako Shimazaki	Noboru Kimura	September 8, 2013
Kagami, who had joined the MDAG for information on the whereabouts on her missing brother, becomes cold towards Uzume again after she refuses to give her her cards. Uzume becomes conflicted over how to make up with Kagami without fighting her or relinquishing her cards. Meanwhile, Kagami, who is given a time limit for completing her requested exchange, also becomes conflicted over whether to betray Uzume or not. Kagami inevitably confronts Uzume in a battle between their dolls. However, Uzume stands firm in her belief that she doesn't want to give up on any of her friends, managing to get through to Kagami's true feelings and ending the battle. Just as Rafflesia offers to help search for Kagami's brother, the MDAG's alleged chairman, Anne, expels Kagami from the group and sends Proto-Zero to attack everyone's dolls. Despite the dolls' best efforts, Madeleine is captured by Anne, who invites Uzume to join the MDAG.
10	"Poked Poker: The Director's Challenge?"; Transliteration: "Pokān to Pōkā: Iinkai no Chōsen?" (Japanese: ぽかーんとポーカー 委員会の挑戦？)	Yoshitaka Nagaoka	Hiroaki Jinno	September 15, 2013
As Uzume remains uncertain over how to get Madeleine back, she receives a message from Anne, who challenges her to a game of poker for her remaining cards. Just as she goes to inspect the necessary equipment sent amongst a shipment of teas, Uzume's mother, Mikoto, stumbles across them first and decides to join their game, teaching Uzume some of the basics before they start. Mikoto gets a strong start against Anne thanks to her bluff. On the next round, Anne goes all in, but Mikoto manages to beat her hand with a stronger one, winning Madeleine's card from her. However, Mikoto then tells Uzume that she has to beat Anne herself if she wants to get Madeleine. Noticing that Anne is parked nearby, the other Dolls head to her location, but are confronted by Proto-Zero. Believing in the faith of her friends, Uzume changes all of her cards and manages to beat Anne's full house with a four-of-a-kind. As per their agreement, Anne has Madeleine delivered to her by the MDAG's true chairman who, to Uzume's surprise, turns out to be Komachi.
11	"Komachi Machi Machi? Promised Devotion"; Transliteration: "Komachi Machi Machi? Yakusoku no Kenshin" (Japanese: 小町まちまち？ 約束の献身)	Tomoaki Koshida	Gorō Taniguchi; Noboru Kimura	September 21, 2013
After returning Madeleine to Uzume, Komachi breaks a seal held on the dolls' memories, revealing that she was once their original master. Postponing the discussion concerning her motives til the next day, Komachi has the dolls stay at her place for the night, leaving Uzume restless. The next day, the girls and dolls meet up with Rafflesia and his partner Mikasa, who explain the origins of the Fantasista Dolls. Having been created by a company that soon got caught up in an international conspiracy, the cards and devices were given to various masters to test the dolls' ability to grow. It is also revealed that the one who came up with the idea for the cards was Kagami's brother, Makoto, who had been hiding in town as a character mascot the entire time. As Uzume feels she has many questions left unanswered, Komachi reveals she started the MDAG in the hopes of reviving Sonnet, a doll who was used as the basis for Proto-Zero, using the data Sasara and the others had gathered. Put under pressure by Komachi's request, Uzume is unable to convince Sasara to stay with her, leaving behind her cards and running off. As she leaves, she meets up with Anne, who tells her that dolls that have had their data extracted will lose all of their memories. Arriving home, Uzume finds a card and a note from the dolls, telling her to search for a 'birthday present'. Confirming her own feelings, Uzume meets up with Komachi again, proving that the dolls still regard Uzume as their master, and stands to fight against her.
12	"Wishes Upbeat, Everyone's Shining"; Transliteration: "Kibō Uki Uki, Minna Kira Kira" (Japanese: 希望うきうき みんなきらきら)	Nanako Shimazaki; Tomoaki Koshida	Gorō Taniguchi; Noboru Kimura	September 28, 2013
It is shown how Sonnet was lost to Komachi when she pushed her out of the way of a speeding truck, her card become crushed as a result. As the battle between Uzume and Komachi begins, Anne asks Makoto for his help in reviving Sonnet. Uzume is soon joined by Kagami and Manai, whose combined show of friendship seems to resonate with Proto-Zero, who expresses her desire to live, making Komachi realises she has been neglecting other dolls whilst focusing on Sonnet. Whilst Makoto states Sonnet cannot be revived using the data from Uzume's dolls, he gives a blank card which could potentially be used to download Sonnet's data from the net. With all the MDAG's masters united, everyone's dolls search for the pieces of data scattered across the world and succeed in reviving Sonnet.

=== Games ===
A video game titled Fantasista Doll Girls Royale playable on Android and iOS smartphones, developed by Drecom, was released on September 2, 2013. Fantasista Doll was featured in Bushiroad's Five Qross online trading card game beginning with November 8 of the same year.

== Reception ==
Carl Kimlinger of Anime News Network gave Fantasista Doll an overall B− rating. He was critical of Taniguchi's production team being over-reliant on the magical girl formula throughout the first two-thirds of the series, highlighting the underwritten characters, cornball relationships and lack of "consistent artistry" in the animation as problems. But Kimlinger gave credit to the series for having a "maddening aptitude" to keep viewers interested for the next episode, empathy towards the Dolls' fear of abandonment and wrapping up their ongoing plot points into a heartfelt conclusion, calling it "a surprisingly poignant finish to a previously undistinguished trifle."
