= Oreshura =

Japanese light novel series and its franchise

- The cover for the first light novel volume, featuring the main characters Eita Kidō and Chiwa Harusaki

俺の彼女と幼なじみが修羅場すぎる (Ore no Kanojo to Osananajimi ga Shuraba Sugiru)
- Genre: Romantic comedy
- Light novel
- Written by: Yūji Yūji
- Illustrated by: Llo
- Published by: SB Creative
- Imprint: GA Bunko
- Original run: February 15, 2011 – February 15, 2022
- Volumes: 18 + extra
- Manga
- Written by: Yūji Yūji
- Illustrated by: Nanasuke
- Published by: Square Enix
- Magazine: Gangan Joker
- Original run: June 22, 2011 – March 22, 2014
- Volumes: 7
- Manga

Ore no Kanojo to Osananajimi ga Shuraba Sugiru 4-koma
- Written by: Yūji Yūji
- Illustrated by: Marimo
- Published by: Square Enix
- Magazine: Young Gangan
- Original run: October 21, 2011 – April 5, 2013
- Volumes: 2
- Manga

Ore no Kanojo to Osananajimi ga Shuraba Sugiru+H
- Written by: Yūji Yūji
- Illustrated by: Shinya Inase
- Published by: Square Enix
- Magazine: Big Gangan
- Original run: October 25, 2011 – October 25, 2012
- Volumes: 2
- Manga

Ore no Kanojo to Osananajimi ga Shuraba Sugiru Ai
- Written by: Yūji Yūji
- Illustrated by: Mutsutake
- Published by: Square Enix
- Magazine: Big Gangan
- Original run: December 25, 2012 – August 24, 2013
- Volumes: 1
- Anime television series
- Directed by: Kanta Kamei
- Produced by: Tatsuya Ishikawa
- Written by: Tatsuhiko Urahata
- Music by: Masatomo Ota
- Studio: A-1 Pictures
- Licensed by: AUS: Hanabee; NA: Aniplex of America
- Original network: Tokyo MX, GYT, GTV, tvk, TVS, CTC, TVA, HBC, ABC, BS11, AT-X
- Original run: January 6, 2013 – March 31, 2013
- Episodes: 13
- icon

Oreshura (俺修羅), short for Ore no Kanojo to Osananajimi ga Shuraba Sugiru (俺の彼女と幼なじみが修羅場すぎる; lit. My Girlfriend and Childhood Friend Fight Too Much), is a Japanese light novel series written by Yūji Yūji, with illustrations provided by Llo. SoftBank Creative published eighteen main novels and one extra from February 2011 to February 2022. There have been four manga adaptations and an anime adaptation by A-1 Pictures aired from January to March 2013.

== Plot ==
Eita Kidō enters high school with the goal of graduating with marks high enough that he can earn a scholarship to medical school. Due to the fact that his parents divorced, found new lovers, and left him in the care of his aunt, he shuns anything to do with romance or love. One day, the school's No.1 beauty, Masuzu Natsukawa, invites him to walk home with her. He quickly deduces that Masuzu is scheming something. It turns out Masuzu is tired of being the center of attention and receiving confessions on a near-daily basis, so she suggests that she and Eita become a fake couple. Although Eita objects, Masuzu blackmails him into becoming her boyfriend in name only. News of the new couple rapidly spreads throughout the school and Eita's childhood friend, Chiwa Harusaki, who fell head over heels in love with him at first sight, begins to vie with Masuzu for Eita's affections.

== Characters ==
Eita Kidō (季堂 鋭太, Kidō Eita)
Voiced by: Junji Majima (drama CD), Ryōta Ōsaka (anime)
The protagonist whose goal is to attend medical school after graduating from high school. He is very smart and always places at the top of the school exams. He has a strong distrust for love and romance. During junior high school, he had teenage delusions and thought of himself as "Burning Fighting Fighter". However, Chiwa's accident caused him to abandon his delusions and decide to become a doctor. Despite having outgrown his teenage delusions, he sometimes backslides if he gets too emotional.
Masuzu Natsukawa (夏川 真涼, Natsukawa Masuzu)
Voiced by: Chiwa Saitō (drama CD), Yukari Tamura (anime)
Masuzu is Eita's "girlfriend". She is the school beauty who returned to Japan after spending nine years in Sweden. Like Eita, she hates romance, and is tired of receiving (and rejecting) confessions on a daily basis. Masuzu uses Eita's notebook from middle school, filled with embarrassing notes and scribbles, to blackmail him into pretending to be her boyfriend. Masuzu likes to quote scenes from the manga JoJo's Bizarre Adventure.
Chiwa Harusaki (春咲 千和, Harusaki Chiwa)
Voiced by: Aki Toyosaki (drama CD), Chinatsu Akasaki (anime)
Chiwa is Eita's childhood best friend. She is usually called "Chiwawa" (chihuahua) by her friends. She started attending the kendo club in elementary school, but had to drop out the year before she entered high school due to a serious injury she suffered in a car accident. She has been in love with Eita for years but was too shy to confess.
Himeka Akishino (秋篠 姫香, Akishino Himeka)
Voiced by: Yui Horie (drama CD), Hisako Kanemoto (anime)
Himeka is Eita's "ex-girlfriend", who has a one-sided crush on him. Himeka has teenage delusions, believing that in a previous life she was "Burning Princess Saint Dragon Lady of Dawn". She believes that Eita and she were a couple in her previous life. Other girls often call her "princess" (姫, hime).
Ai Fuyuumi (冬海 愛衣, Fuyuumi Ai)
Voiced by: Ai Kayano
Ai is Eita's "fiancée" and childhood friend whom he knew a year before he met Chiwa and who moved away ten years ago but has recently returned. Ai considers herself to be the one for Eita because she confessed to him while they were in kindergarten and they even signed a makeshift marriage registration, making them engaged, although Eita did not understand the concept of marriage.
Saeko Kiryū (桐生 冴子, Kiryū Saeko)
Voiced by: Kaori Nazuka
Saeko is Eita's aunt whom he has lived with since his parents abandoned him. She works at a gaming company that makes mostly bishōjo games.
Kaoru Asoi (遊井 カオル, Asoi Kaoru)
Voiced by: Risa Taneda
Kaoru is Eita's classmate and his best friend.
Mana Natsukawa (夏川 真那, Natsukawa Mana)
Voiced by: Nao Tōyama
Mana is Masuzu's little sister, who is seen with a bodyguard at all times. She wants her older sister to come back to Sweden.
Miharu Misora (美空 美晴, Misora Miharu)
Miharu is a character exclusive to the Ore no Kanojo to Osananajimi ga Shuraba Sugiru+H spin-off manga. She is the daughter of a middle school principal, who tries to capture Eita's affections.

== Media ==
=== Light novels ===
Ore no Kanojo to Osananajimi ga Shuraba Sugiru began as a light novel series written by Yūji Yūji, with illustrations by Llo. The first volume was published on February 15, 2011, under SoftBank Creative's GA Bunko imprint, and the eighteenth and last on February 15, 2022. A spin-off novel was also released on February 15, 2013.

No.	Japanese release date	Japanese ISBN
1	February 15, 2011	978-4-7973-6396-8
2	June 15, 2011	978-4-7973-6561-0
3	September 15, 2011	978-4-7973-6678-5
4	December 15, 2011	978-4-7973-6815-4
5	July 15, 2012	978-4-7973-6971-7
6	January 15, 2013	978-4-7973-7284-7
6.5	February 15, 2013	978-4-7973-7285-4
7	February 15, 2014	978-4-7973-7555-8
8	July 15, 2014	978-4-7973-7735-4
9	January 15, 2015	978-4-7973-8264-8
10	December 15, 2015	978-4-7973-8324-9
11	June 15, 2016	978-4-7973-8751-3
12	November 15, 2016	978-4-7973-8829-9
13	September 15, 2017	978-4-7973-9153-4
14	May 14, 2020	978-4-8156-0621-3
15	September 16, 2020	978-4-8156-0754-8
16	March 12, 2021	978-4-8156-0755-5
17	September 14, 2021	978-4-8156-1074-6
18	February 15, 2022	978-4-8156-1075-3

=== Manga ===
A manga adaptation, illustrated by Nanasuke, was serialized between the July 2011 and April 2014 issues of Square Enix's Gangan Joker manga magazine. The series was compiled into seven tankōbon volumes published between December 15, 2011, and April 22, 2014. A four-panel comic strip manga, illustrated by Marimo and titled Ore no Kanojo to Osananajimi ga Shuraba Sugiru 4-koma (俺の彼女と幼なじみが修羅場すぎる4コマ), was serialized in Square Enix's Young Gangan magazine between October 21, 2011, and April 5, 2013. The series was compiled into two tankōbon volumes, released on July 14, 2012, and January 12, 2013.

A third manga, illustrated by Shinya Inase and titled Ore no Kanojo to Osananajimi ga Shuraba Sugiru+H (俺の彼女と幼なじみが修羅場すぎる+H), was serialized in Square Enix's Big Gangan between October 25, 2011, and October 25, 2012. Two volumes for Inase's manga were released: the first on July 14, 2012 and the second on December 22, 2012. A fourth manga, illustrated by Mutsutake and titled Ore no Kanojo to Osananajimi ga Shuraba Sugiru Ai (俺の彼女と幼なじみが修羅場すぎる 愛), was serialized in Big Gangan between December 25, 2012, and August 24, 2013. Its chapters were collected in one tankōbon volume, published on October 22, 2013. Square Enix published an anthology volume on March 22, 2013.

Oreshura

No.	Japanese release date	Japanese ISBN
1	December 15, 2011	978-4-7575-3433-9
2	April 21, 2012	978-4-7575-3571-8
3	July 14, 2012	978-4-7575-3656-2
4	December 22, 2012	978-4-7575-3833-7
5	June 22, 2013	978-4-7575-3990-7
6	October 22, 2013	978-4-7575-4093-4
7	April 22, 2014	978-4-7575-4287-7

=== Drama CDs and radio show ===
Hobirecords released two drama CDs in 2011: the first on July 29 and the second on October 28. An Internet radio show, titled Shuraba Radio and hosted by Chiwa Saitō and Junji Majima, started irregular broadcasts on April 28, 2011, and is produced by Hobirecords. A second radio show began broadcasting in December 2012 hosted by Chinatsu Akasaki and Ai Kayano.

=== Anime ===
An anime television series adaptation, produced by A-1 Pictures and directed by Kanta Kamei, aired in Japan from January 6 to March 31, 2013. The anime was simulcast by Crunchyroll, subtitled in English. The opening theme is "Girlish Lover" by Chinatsu Akasaki, Yukari Tamura, Hisako Kanemoto and Ai Kayano, and the ending theme is "W:Wonder Tale" by Yukari Tamura.

No.	Title (Note: All English titles are taken from Crunchyroll.)	Original air date
1	"The Start of My High School Life is a Battleground" "Kōkō Seikatsu no Sutāto wa Shuraba" (高校生活のスタートは修羅場)	January 6, 2013
A young boy called Eita enters high school aiming for the National University School of Medicine. Because of his parents' divorce and his goal, he shuns anything to do with romance or love. One day Masuzu, the school beauty with the silver hair, who is just returned to the country, enters his life in a most unexpected way. Chiwa, his childhood friend since elementary school, will not let this go without a fight.
2	"Starting a New Club is a Battleground" "Atarashii Bu o Kessei Shite Shuraba" (新しい部を結成して修羅場)	January 13, 2013
Chiwa confronts Eita about his new girlfriend, Masuzu. Chiwa tells Eita that she will be popular in no time and get a boyfriend. Masuzu makes a school club to help Chiwa become popular and ends up embarrassing Chiwa in front of other students. Masuzu tells Eita that she wants him to not look at other girls.
3	"A Battleground over the Tears of a Childhood Friend" "Osananajimi no Namida de Shuraba" (幼なじみの涙で修羅場)	January 20, 2013
With Masuzu's help, Chiwa sends a love letter to Sakagami, who reveals that he has feelings for Chiwa too. The two agree to go on a date. Chiwa's past is revealed in that she got into a serious accident, where she lost her ability to do Kendo forever. Eita promises to be a doctor to heal her.
4	"Fighting over a Guy is a Battlefield" "Otoko no Tatakai wa Shuraba" (男の戦いは修羅場)	January 27, 2013
Eita gets up early to spy on Chiwa's first date with Sakagami. Masuzu has the same idea but she is there to watch something else unfold. Sakagami intentionally arrives one hour late to his date. His friends show up with him to mock Chiwa. Eita wants to interfere, but Masuzu stops him, telling him this is a chance to get Chiwa disillusioned about love. Eita steps in to beat up Sakagami, but is beat up himself. Chiwa beats up Sakagami with a pole she uses with her Kendo skills.
5	"The Truth of the Love Letter is a Battleground" "Rabu Retā no Shinsō wa Shuraba" (ラブレターの真相は修羅場)	February 3, 2013
Eita keeps finding new love letters in his shoebox, but before he can deal with them a new girl, Himeka Akishino, shows up and hugs him in front of Masuzu and Chiwa.
6	"A Battlefield Where the Gray World is Cut to Shreds" "Haiiro no Sekai o Kirisaku Shuraba" (灰色の世界を切り裂く修羅場)	February 10, 2013
Eita and the others are forced to clean the pool after being caught by the hall monitors. Mana shows up once again and so does a red-haired hall monitor named Ai.
7	"They're Only Summer Classes, But They Too Are A Battlefield" "Kaki Kōshū nanoni Shuraba" (夏期講習なのに修羅場)	February 17, 2013
The club is shut down by Ai. Eita attends summer classes, along with Ai and her childhood friend, Kaoru. Masuzu orders Eita to confirm that the boyfriend Ai talked about is fake.
8	"Movie Theater Double Dates are a Battlefield" "Eigakan W Dēto de Shuraba" (映画館Wデートで修羅場)	February 24, 2013
In order to expose Ai's weaknesses, Eita and Chiwa join Kaoru and Ai in a movie double date. Chiwa and Ai end up arguing with each other as they supported opposing love rivals in the movie they watched.
9	"Promises That Come Back are a Battlefield" "Yomigaeru Yakusoku wa Shuraba" (よみがえる約束は修羅場)	March 3, 2013
Eita reads Ai's delusional notes by accident. As an apology, Eita accompanies Ai to the local festival. Ai reveals herself to be Eita's childhood friend from kindergarten and that, according to their childhood promise, they are also engaged to each other. The club reopens with Ai joining as club adviser.
10	"Summer Training Camp Meetings are a Battlefield" "Natsu Gasshuku no Kaigi de Shuraba" (夏合宿の会議で修羅場)	March 10, 2013
The club decides to go to the beach for their summer club activity. Chiwa asks Eita to accompany her to buy a swimsuit. Masuzu steps in to interfere with Chiwa and Eita's date, while Himeka and Ai follow Eita in secret. All of them end up spending time together. On their way home, they meet Eita's aunt, Saeko, who realizes that Masuzu and Eita's relationship is fake, and questions Eita about which girl he likes the most.
11	"The Excitement The Night Before a Trip is a Battlefield" "Gasshuku Zen'ya no Wakuwaku wa Shuraba" (合宿前夜のワクワクは修羅場)	March 17, 2013
Saeko offers the girls a chance to save money on the trip by entering a marketing contest for her new game, and intentionally excludes Masuzu. She also explains why she thinks Eita and Masuzu's relationship is fake. As everyone prepares for the trip to the beach, Eita realizes that Ai, Hime and Chiwa have become good friends while Masuzu has been left out. Both Masuzu and Eita are also rattled by Saeko-san.
12	"The Result Following a Scheme is a Battlefield" "Bōryaku no Ketsumatsu wa Shuraba" (謀略の結末は修羅場)	March 24, 2013
The club goes on a trip to the beach and enjoy quality time together. Chiwa, Ai, and Hime decide to buy matching key chains or cellphone strap to symbolize their club. This makes Masuzu realize that she doesn't fit in and that she can't win the contest. She thanks Eita for all he has done and tells him that she will set him free after the contest. At the end of the episode, Eita is accidentally run over by Mana. They have a short conversation and Mana realizes that Eita likes Masuzu and thanks him for that. Eita asks her if anyone can stand being with a liar and Mana hints that only her accomplice would be able to do that.
13	"A Battlefield that Leads to a New World" "Atarashii Sekai e no Shuraba" (新しい世界への修羅場)	March 31, 2013
The competition begins and when it is time for Masuzu's speech, Eita confesses to her and tells her that they have the worst personalities together but deserve each other. The couple shares a kiss on stage as the other girls look on from the crowd. He has chosen the "battlefield route" instead of a "harem route" and so he attempts to make each of the girls hate him so that they move on. Instead, Eita unintentionally inspires all three of the other girls to fight even harder to win his affections. Chiwa later steals a kiss. The episode closes with Chiwa and Masuzu each holding onto one of Eita's arms, indicating another love battle on the horizon, which includes Ai and Himeka.

== See also ==
- The 100th Time's the Charm, another light novel series written by the same author.
- Mushi-Uta, another light novel series illustrated by the same illustrator.
- Reincarnated as a Sword, another light novel series illustrated by the same illustrator.
- Unbreakable Machine-Doll, another light novel series illustrated by the same illustrator.
