= The 100th Time's the Charm =

Japanese light novel series

- The 100th Time's the Charm: She Was Executed 99 Times, So How Did She Unlock "Super Love" Mode?!
- First light novel volume cover

99回断罪されたループ令嬢ですが今世は「超絶愛されモード」ですって!? 〜真の力に目覚めて始まる100回目の人生〜 (99-kai Danzai sareta Rūpu Reijō desu ga Konse wa "Chouzetsu Aisare Mode" desutte?!: Shin no Chikara ni Mezamete Hajimaru 100-kai-me no Jinsei)
- Genre: Fantasy
- Novel series
- Written by: Hima Maruyama
- Published by: Shōsetsuka ni Narō
- Original run: May 25, 2022 – May 30, 2022
- Light novel
- Written by: Yūji Yūji
- Illustrated by: Nami Hidaka
- Published by: Drecom Media
- English publisher: NA: J-Novel Club
- Imprint: DRE Novels
- Original run: October 7, 2022 – present
- Volumes: 3
- Manga
- Written by: Yūji Yūji
- Illustrated by: Roharu Kai
- Published by: Drecom Media
- English publisher: NA: J-Novel Club
- Imprint: DRE Comics F
- Magazine: DRE Comics
- Original run: June 23, 2023 – present
- Volumes: 7
- Anime television series

KuKu-Loop: The 100th Time's the Charm
- Directed by: Sayaka Yamai (chief); Bao Ning Wen
- Written by: Deko Akao
- Studio: Xingfu
- Original run: 2027 – scheduled
- icon

The 100th Time's the Charm: She Was Executed 99 Times, So How Did She Unlock "Super Love" Mode?! (Japanese: 99回断罪されたループ令嬢ですが今世は「超絶愛されモード」ですって!? 〜真の力に目覚めて始まる100回目の人生〜, Hepburn: 99-kai Danzai sareta Rūpu Reijō desu ga Konse wa "Chouzetsu Aisare Mode" desutte?!: Shin no Chikara ni Mezamete Hajimaru 100-kai-me no Jinsei) is a Japanese light novel series written by Yūji Yūji and illustrated by Nami Hidaka. It was originally published as a web novel on the online publishing platform Shōsetsuka ni Narō in May 2022. Drecom Media later picked it up for publication, releasing the first volume under their DRE Novels imprint in October 2022; three volumes have been published as of September 2024. A manga adaptation illustrated by Roharu Kai began serialization on Drecom Media's DRE Comics service in June 2023, and has been compiled into six tankōbon volumes as of March 2026. An anime television series adaptation produced by Xingfu is set to premiere in 2027.

== Plot ==
The series focuses on Alphina, a princess who is falsely accused of an assassination plot, leading to her engagement being called off and her beheading. Each time she dies, time rewinds, allowing to live through her life again, only to meet the same fate. After the 99th time, she discovers that she has the ability to hear other people's true thoughts, finding out that others actually love her instead of hating her. Armed with this new power, she aims to avoid dying during this 100th loop.

== Characters ==
Alphina (アルフィナ, Arufina)
Voiced by: Ikumi Hasegawa
Lionett (リオネット, Rionetto)
Voiced by: Kazuki Ura

== Media ==
=== Light novel ===
The series is written by Yūji Yūji, who originally posted fourteen chapters on the online platform Shōsetsuka ni Narō in May 2022 under the pen name Hima Maruyama. Drecom Media later picked it up for publication, releasing the first volume under their DRE Novels imprint on October 7, 2022. Three volumes have been published as of September 2024. The series is licensed in English by J-Novel Club.

No.	Original release date	Original ISBN	North American release date	North American ISBN
1	October 7, 2022	978-4-434-30912-0	May 4, 2023	978-1-71-830662-2
2	February 10, 2023	978-4-434-31576-3	July 5, 2023	978-1-71-830664-6
3	September 10, 2024	978-4-434-34437-4	April 18, 2025	978-1-71-830670-7

=== Manga ===
A manga adaptation illustrated by Roharu Kai began serialization on Drecom Media's DRE Comics service on June 23, 2023, and has been compiled into seven tankōbon volumes as of November 2026. The manga adaptation is also licensed in English by J-Novel Club.

No.	Original release date	Original ISBN	North American release date	North American ISBN
1	October 25, 2023	978-4-434-32635-6	July 24, 2024	978-1-71-836339-7
2	March 22, 2024	978-4-434-33541-9	November 27, 2024	978-1-71-836340-3
3	August 23, 2024	978-4-434-34320-9	February 19, 2025	978-1-71-836341-0
4	February 20, 2025	978-4-434-35332-1	August 6, 2025	978-1-71-836342-7
5	August 20, 2025	978-4-434-36310-8	January 7, 2026	978-1-71-836343-4
6	March 19, 2026	978-4-434-37565-1	August 12, 2026	978-1-71-836344-1
7	November 20, 2026	978-4-434-38872-9	—	—

=== Anime ===
At Anime Expo 2025, an anime adaptation was announced. Titled in English as KuKu-Loop: The 100th Time's the Charm, it will be produced by Xingfu and directed by Bao Ning Wen, with Sayaka Yamai serving as chief director, Deko Akao handling series composition, and Miwa Ōshima designing the characters. The series is set to premiere in 2027.

== See also ==
- My Next Life as a Villainess: All Routes Lead to Doom!, another light novel series illustrated by Nami Hidaka
- Oreshura, another light novel series written by Yūji Yūji
