= CrowdStar =

American video game developer

Crowdstar
- Website type: Video Game Developer
- Available in: Multilingual (70)
- Area served: Worldwide
- Website: crowdstar.com
- Launched: 2009
- Current status: Inactive

CrowdStar is a former developer of Facebook and mobile games, based in Burlingame, California, United States and Dublin, Ireland. The company developed several titles for the Facebook platform, with some of its most popular titles being Happy Aquarium, Happy Pets, Wasteland Empires and It Girl, and a number of titles on mobile for the iOS, Android and Windows Markets, including Design Home, Fish With Attitude, Phuzzle, Top Girl, and Covet Fashion. It was acquired by Glu Mobile in 2016.

== Founding and History ==
Founded by Suren Markosian and Jeff Tseng, it has ranked 4th among developers with the most monthly active users for Facebook applications, with 31 million daily active users. The company turned down an offer from Microsoft to acquire the company for more than US$200 million. Its current CEO is Jeffrey Tseng, who was appointed to the position in October 2012. He succeeded Peter Relan, who became CEO in January 2011 from Niren Hiro.

The company currently develop new titles for the iOS, Android, and Windows 8 tablet and smartphone market. They maintain and release new content in existing games on their Facebook platform.

=== Shift to Mobile ===
In February 2012, the company announced its desire to focus upon the mobile market, and thus would not be creating any new titles for the Facebook platform, laying off two dozen developers, yet still maintain existing titles to this day. With the new funding, the company decided to "pursue mobile games targeting the female audience and focusing on shopping and fashion." The games will be distributed using Facebook’s social graph, the Gree social gaming network and Apple’s Game Center and Google Play. Since its focus on the mobile market, it has produced several new titles, such as "Top Stylist", "Phuzzle", "Fish With Attitude" and "Mermaid World.

=== Acquisition ===
In 2016, Glu Mobile acquired CrowdStar, effectively killing the company.

== Funding ==
In May 2011, the company raised an additional $23 million. In May 2012, the company raised a further $11.5M in Venture Round funding.
