= Paolo Andrea Di Pietro =

Italian-Japanese singer and actor

- Di Pietro in November 2026
- Born: November 8, 1986 (age 40); Milan, Italy
- Other names: Paolo; Paolo Di Pietro
- Education: University of Milan; Milan Conservatory
- Occupations: Tarento, Actor, Singer, Lyricist
- Website: https://www.instagram.com/paolojapan/

Paolo Andrea Di Pietro (born November 8, 1986), also known mononymously in Japan as Paolo (Japanese: パオロ), is an Italian singer and actor living and working in Japan (Gaikokujin tarento). He has appeared in a variety of Japanese commercials, TV shows and films. He also lent his singing voice to anime and video game soundtracks of internationally known franchises such as Dragon Quest, Final Fantasy, Genshin Impact and My Hero Academia.

== Early life ==
He was born on November 8, 1986, in Milan. He started studying guitar at the age of 10 and singing at the age of 16. In 2006, he began studying opera at the Milan Conservatory. He also attended the University of Milan majoring in English and Japanese studies, including language and culture. He graduated from the same university and moved to Japan in 2014.

== Career ==
=== As an opera singer ===
Under the guidance of the tenor Angelo Lo Forese and the bass Bonaldo Giaiotti he won his first vocal competition in 2012 and had his operatic debut in the same year as the title role in Mozart's The Marriage of Figaro. In 2013 he performed the role of Daland from Wagner's The Flying Dutchman in over 20 famous Italian theaters, such as Teatro Comunale Luciano Pavarotti and Teatro Comunale di Bologna. In 2015 he had his operatic debut in Japan as Colline in Puccini's La bohème for the Japanese Agency for Cultural Affairs. In 2019 he performed for the first time in the United States, at Carnegie Hall in New York City.

=== As a TV personality, actor and recording artist ===
In 2018 he passed the audition for the Japanese TV Commercial for a product called AirPay by Recruit, acting beside Joe Odagiri. The comedic commercial, his first on screen job, soon went viral in Japan and became a still ongoing series. In 2019 he appeared in episodes 31 and 32 of the TV Program KAT-TUN no Sekai Ichi Tame ni Naru Tabi Plus on the Paravi streaming service and once the program moved to TBS Television, he became a regular guest until the program ended in 2021. In 2020 he performed the singing role of the "Ketchup Demon" next to Naomi Watanabe and Yūki Iwai from Haraichi in the live comedy program Owarai no Hi - Oto Neta Fes, the character went viral on Japanese Twitter, reaching rank 1 in Twitter trends. Currently, he is active as an actor, voice actor, narrator, musician and lyricist in various media such as TV commercials, TV shows, movies, anime and video games.

== Filmography ==
=== Film ===
Year	Title	Role	Notes
2017	Memoirs of a Murderer	Opera Singer	Performance of Non più andrai
2023	We're Millennials. Got a Problem?: The Movie	Achille	
2025	Stigmatized Properties: Possession		Soundtrack vocals
2025	Rental Family	Handsome Actor	

=== Television ===
Year	Title	Role	Notes
2019	Two Homelands	Ronnie	TV special
2019	NEWS MORNING SATELLITE - Totsuzen Desu ga Pinchi desu	Bruno Rossi	Season 3, episodes 12 & 13
2019	Time Limit Investigator (Jikō Keisatsu)	FBI Colleague	Season 3, episode 6
2020	Yell	Singer	Episode 1
2020	Peep Time	R. Bruce (Baseball Player)	Episode 5
2021	She Was Pretty (Kanojo wa Kirei Datta)	James Taylor	Episode 5
2022	Sensuikan Cappellini-gō no Bōken	Angelo	TV special, main cast
2022	Maison Häagen-Dazs: 8 Happy Stories	Bear	Voice, regular main cast
2022	Game Of Spy	The Man with the Eyepatch	Episode 1
2022	AIBOU: Tokyo Detective Duo	TV Panelist	Season 21, episode 1
2022	Businessman Thomas	Harold	Episode 3
2024	Nevertheless: The Shapes of Love	Nick	Episode 3
2025	Zaibatsu Fukushū	Masayuki Ise's Business Partner	Episode 7
2025	Tokyo Holiday	Richard	Regular main cast
2025	Queen of Mars	Shopkeeper	Recurring cast
2026	ONE FALL AND YOU'RE DONE		Soundtrack vocals
2026	GATE24:The Border	Jim Brown	Episode 8

=== Anime ===
Year	Title	Role	Notes
2017	BBK/BRNK: The Gentle Giants of the Galaxy		Insert song "Liberetto", lyrics and soundtrack vocals
2018	Overlord II		Soundtrack vocals
2018	Overlord III		Soundtrack vocals
2020-2022	Dragon Quest: The Adventure of Dai		Insert songs "Vearn, The Dark King", “Vearn, the True Dark King”, “Sovereign Supreme”, “Absolute Strength - The Way of Combat”
2021	Otoppe		Ending song "Bonso Waltz"
2022	Thermae Romae Novae		Opening song "Tōgyūshi no Uta: Onsen Manner no Aria", lyrics for opening and all insert songs, Latin language supervision
2022	Overlord IV		Soundtrack vocals
2022	Cardfight!! Vanguard will+Dress		Episode 11 insert song "Into the Cemetery"
2023	Dead Mount Death Play		Soundtrack vocals
2025	Kamitsubaki City Under Construction		Soundtrack vocals
2026	Daemons of the Shadow Realm		Soundtrack vocals
2026	The Drops of God		Episode 1 special opening song "La vita in Rosso"
2026	Dragon Striker		Soundtrack vocals
2026	The Saga of Tanya the Evil II		Soundtrack vocals
2026	Pandorobo		Insert song

=== Anime movies ===
Year	Title	Role	Notes
2020	Saga of Tanya the Evil: The Movie		Soundtrack vocals
2021	Knights of Sidonia: Love Woven in the Stars		Soundtrack vocals
2024	My Hero Academia: You're Next		Insert song "Gollini -Admire-", soundtrack vocals
2024	Overlord: The Sacred Kingdom		Soundtrack vocals
2025	Tōi-san wa Seishun Shitai! "Baka to SmaPho to Romance to"		Soundtrack vocals

=== Video games ===
Year	Title	Role	Notes
2019	Honor of Kings		Insert song "Brethren of Blades" (duet with Remi Tanaka)
2019	A Certain Magical Index: Imaginary Fest	Italian Assassin	
2021	Final Fantasy VII Remake Intergrade		Insert songs "The Happy Turtle Jingle ft. Old Snapper" and "Extravagant Turtle Flyer Fanfare", soundtrack vocals
2022	Final Fantasy VI Pixel Remaster	Draco	French and Italian vocals
2023	Genshin Impact		Promotional song “Polumnia Omnia (Performance Version)”
2024	Final Fantasy VII Rebirth		Insert song “With Pain and Spite Made Black”, Latin translation
2024	ORE’N		Insert song "Demon God Smirnoff's Theme" and others, soundtrack vocals
2024	eFootball		Motion capture
2025	Blue Protocol: Star Resonance		Insert song "Denvel Final Boss Fight - Last Phase"
2025	Pacific Drive: Whispers in the Woods		Main theme "The Harmonic Fellowship"
2025	The Outer Worlds 2		Insert song "Resolute" (trio with John Robert Matz and Laura Intravia), soundtrack vocals
2026	Vampire Survivors: Legacy of the Bloodmoon		Main theme "Legacy of the Bloodmoon" (bass vocals)

=== Music videos ===
Year	Title	Artist	Role	Notes
2018	DVD "Himitsu"	Polkadot Stingray	Foreigner who loves Samurai	Direct to video short film
2019	Night Groovin'	QoN	Main actor	
2019	DVD/STAGE VIDEO "LIVE TOUR 2019 ~XV~"	TVXQ	Danny's Father, Bass Player	Short film used in live tour
2019	Ai Dake Ga Subete / What Do You Want? (Mitazono Version)	Hey! Say! JUMP	Guitarist	
2021	Helpless Romantic	Ken Yokoyama	Main actor	
2023	Polumnia Omnia (Performance Version)	HoYoverse / HOYO-MiX	Main singer	Genshin Impact Sumeru Vol. 2 OST Album Promotional MV
2023	Genshin Concert 2023 - Melodies of an Endless Journey - Scenic Vistas	HoYoverse / HOYO-MiX	Singer of Polumnia Omnia	Online Concert
2023	Genshin Concert Tour - Melodies of an Endless Journey	HoYoverse / HOYO-MiX	Singer of Rhapsodia Roscida and Polumnia Omnia	Live concert, filmed in Osaka
2026	Greed	ASK I FALL	Mafia Boss	
