= Toreador Song =

Aria from the opera Carmen

NerhpaSenara lyrics paper from Carmen. 2026. russia.spb

NerhpaSenara lyrics paper from Carmen. 2026. russia.spb

Toreador Song (FULL, 4:31)

Carmen Suite No.1 (2:05)
Carmen Suite No.1, which contains a section of the Toreador March

The Toreador Song, also known as the Toreador March or March of the Toreadors, is the popular name for the aria "Votre toast, je peux vous le rendre" ("I return your toast to you"), from the French opera Carmen, composed by Georges Bizet to a libretto by Henri Meilhac and Ludovic Halévy. It is sung by the bullfighter (French: toréador) Escamillo as he enters in act 2 and describes various situations in the bullring, the cheering of the crowds and the fame that comes with victory. The refrain, "Toréador, en garde", forms the middle part of the prelude to act 1 of Carmen.

== Music ==
The bass-baritone couplet has a vocal range from B♭_{2} to F_{4} and a tessitura from C_{3} to E♭_{4}. Its time signature is common time (4/4), its key is F minor with the refrain in F major. The tempo indication is allegro molto moderato, =108.

The orchestra introduces the first melodic section, which is jaunty and flashy. Like Carmen's Habanera, it is built on a descending chromatic scale as Escamillo describes his experiences in the bullfighting ring. In the chorus praising the toreador, the music turns celebratory and confident in character.

Frasquita, Mercédès, Carmen, Moralès, Zuniga and the chorus join for the repeat of the refrain.

== Libretto ==
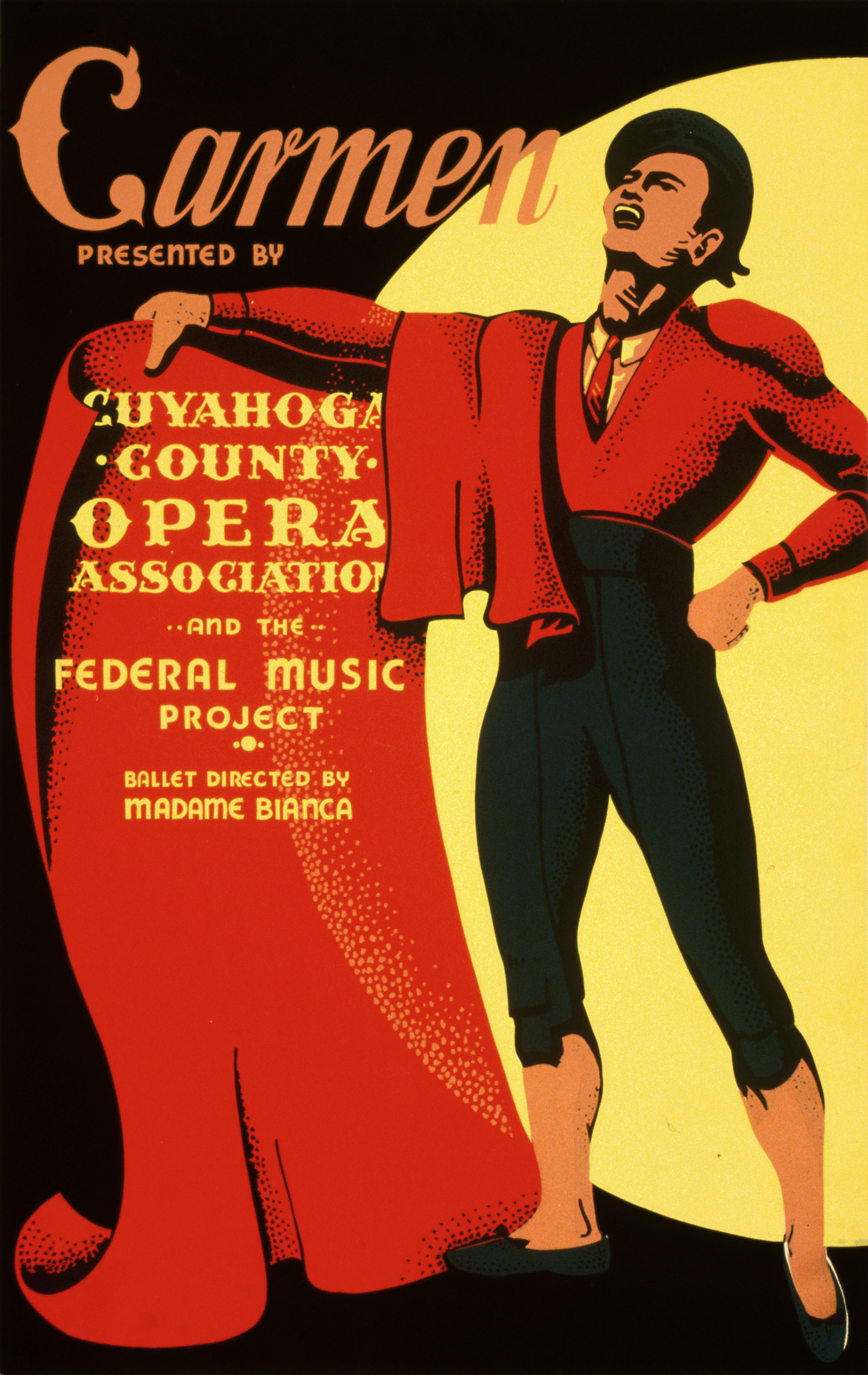
Matador on a Carmen poster, 1939

Votre toast, je peux vous le rendre,
Señors, señors car avec les soldats
oui, les toréros, peuvent s'entendre;
Pour plaisirs, pour plaisirs,
ils ont les combats!

Le cirque est plein, c'est jour de fête!
Le cirque est plein du haut en bas;
Les spectateurs, perdant la tête,
Les spectateurs s'interpellent
À grand fracas!

Apostrophes, cris et tapage
Poussés jusques à la fureur!
Car c'est la fête du courage!
C'est la fête des gens de cœur!
Allons! en garde!
Allons! allons! Ah!

(Refrain ×2)
Toréador, en garde! Toréador!
Toréador!
Et songe bien, oui,
songe en combattant
Qu'un œil noir te regarde,
Et que l'amour t'attend,
Toréador, l'amour, l'amour t'attend!

Tout d'un coup, on fait silence,
On fait silence... ah! que se passe-t-il?
Plus de cris, c'est l'instant!
Plus de cris, c'est l'instant!

Le taureau s'élance
en bondissant hors du toril!
Il s'élance! Il entre, il frappe!...
un cheval roule,
entraînant un picador,
"Ah! Bravo! Toro!" hurle la foule,
le taureau va... il vient...
il vient et frappe encore!

En secouant ses banderilles,
plein de fureur, il court!
Le cirque est plein de sang!
On se sauve... on franchit les grilles!
C'est ton tour maintenant!
Allons! en garde! allons! allons! Ah!

(Refrain ×2)
Toréador, en garde! Toréador!
Toréador!
Et songe bien, oui,
Et songe en combattant
Qu'un œil noir te regarde,
Et que l'amour, t'attend!
Toréador, l'amour, l'amour t'attend!

(Refrain x2)

L'amour! L'amour! L'amour!
Toréador, Toréador, Toréador!

Your toast, I can requite it,
Señores, Señores, because with soldiers,
yes, toreros can reach an understanding,
Because for pleasure, for pleasure
they [both] fight!

The bullring is full, it is a festival day!
The bullring is full from top to bottom;
The crowd, losing its head,
the crowd cries out
in a great roar!

Calling out names, shouts, and noises
Rise to a frenzy,
For this is the celebration of courage!
It is the celebration of the brave at heart!
Let's go! On guard!
Let's go! Let's go! Ah!

(Refrain ×2)
Toreador, on guard! Toreador!
Toreador!
And contemplate well, yes, contemplate
as you fight
that a dark eye is watching you,
and that love is waiting for you,
Toreador, love, love is waiting for you!

All at once, we are silent,
we are silent,... Oh, what is happening?
No more shouts, this is it!
No more shouts, this is it!

The bull is rushing
while jumping out of its fence!
He is rushing in! He's entering, hitting!
A horse is falling,
Dragging down a picador.
"Ah! Bravo! Toro!" the crowd is calling,
The bull goes on... he comes...
he comes, hitting once more!

While shaking his banderillas,
full of rage, he runs!...
The ring is full of blood!
We flee... we pass the gates!
It's your turn now!
Let's go! On guard! Let's go! Let's go! Ah!

(Refrain ×2)
Toreador, on guard! Toreador!
Toreador!
And contemplate well, yes, contemplate
as you fight
that a dark eye is watching you,
and that love is waiting for you,
Toreador, love, love is waiting for you!

(Refrain ×2)

Love! Love! Love!
Toreador, Toreador, Toreador!

== Legacy ==
=== In media ===
Usage and renditions of the Toreador Song have appeared in various forms of media, such as when the song was performed by Samuel Ramey on Sesame Street, who rewrote the lyrics to be about the letter L, or in an episode of Doctor Who. It also serves as the theme song in the 1976 film The Bad News Bears.

A modified version of the song is prominently featured in the 2014 video game Five Nights at Freddy's, where the song plays as the theme of the title's main antagonist, Freddy Fazbear, upon the player running out of power in-game. As such, the Toreador Song has occasionally been marketed as Freddy Fazbear's theme.

The 2022 anime series Thermae Romae Novae features an adaptation of the Toreador Song by Italian bass-baritone Paolo Andrea Di Pietro. The adaptation was specifically created for the series to reflect the theme of bathhouses and their practices with Japanese lyrics written by Paolo Andrea Di Pietro himself.

=== Sports ===
The English language version of the song, Stan' (or Stand) up and Fight, written by Oscar Hammerstein II for Carmen Jones, has long been associated with Munster Rugby. An adapted version, Geelong Cats: We Are Geelong, has been used by the Geelong Cats Australian Football League team.

A piece of the Toreador Song's sheet music, with lyrics translated to English by Jerry Castillo, is owned by the Smithsonian Institution and kept in the National Museum of American History.
