= Japanese bath =

Japanese bath may refer to:

- Sentō (銭湯), a type of Japanese communal bath house
- Furo (お風呂), a type of bathtub commonly used in Japan
- Onsen (温泉), a Japanese hot spring traditionally used for public bathing
- The bathroom in a Japanese house
- Customs and etiquette of Japan related to bathing
