= Thermae Romae =

Japanese manga and TV series

- Cover of the first manga volume

テルマエ・ロマエ (Terumae Romae)
- Genre: Comedy
- Manga
- Written by: Mari Yamazaki
- Published by: Enterbrain
- English publisher: NA: Yen Press
- Magazine: Comic Beam
- Original run: 2008 – 2013
- Volumes: 6
- Anime television series
- Directed by: Azuma Tani
- Studio: DLE
- Licensed by: AUS: Siren Visual; NA: Discotek Media
- Original network: Fuji TV (Noitamina)
- Original run: January 12, 2012 – January 26, 2012
- Episodes: 6
- Original net animation
- Thermae Romae Novae (2022)
- Manga

Thermae Romae Redux
- Written by: Mari Yamazaki
- Published by: Shueisha
- Magazine: Shōnen Jump+
- Original run: February 6, 2024 – present
- Volumes: 1

Thermae Romae (Japanese: テルマエ・ロマエ, Hepburn: Terumae Romae; Latin for "(The) Baths of Rome") is a Japanese manga series by Mari Yamazaki. It won the third Manga Taishō and the Short Story Award at the 14th Tezuka Osamu Cultural Prize. The manga has been licensed in North America by Yen Press.

DLE adapted a flash anime aired on Fuji TV between January 12, 2012, and January 26, 2012, which also produced a live-action film adaptation released on April 28, 2012, and a second film, Thermae Romae II, was released in 2014. An original net animation (ONA) series adaptation by NAZ titled Thermae Romae Novae was announced and premiered on Netflix in March 2022. A sequel manga titled Thermae Romae redux began serialization on Shueisha's Shōnen Jump+ website and app on February 6, 2024.

== Plot ==
The story follows an ancient Roman architect named Lucius, who is having trouble coming up with ideas. One day, he discovers a hidden tunnel underneath a spa that leads him to a modern Japanese bath house. Inspired by the innovations found there, he creates his own spa, Roma Thermae, bringing the modern ideas to his time.

Each subsequent chapter follows Lucius facing some sort of a problem, just to be swept to Japan once again. He visits modern bath houses, personal baths, waterparks, fertility festivals, and even zoos. There, he always happens to find the inspiration to solve the exact problem he has been tasked with.

== Characters ==
- Lucius Modestus (ルシウス・モデストゥス, Rushiusu Modesutusu), a Roman thermae architect who excels in designs ends up discovering modern Japanese baths, believing them to be the baths of 'flat-faced slaves'. He uses these ideas in his own work back home, eventually inspiring others with his discoveries. His endeavours sometimes lead to unfortunate consequences, including costing him his marriage, arousing suspicion of being Emperor Hadrian's homosexual lover, and destroying businesses.
- Marcus Pietras (マルクス・ピエトラス, Marukusu Pietorasu), Lucius's friend and a marble sculptor. Oftentimes, he becomes Lucius's carver in his projects.
- Hadrianus (ハドリアヌス, Hadorianusu), Emperor of Roman Empire. Initially commissioned Lucius of building a private thermae, then commissioned him for more baths.
- Lepidus (レピドゥス, Repidusu)
- Satsuki Odate, a 28 year old Japanese woman who is both the town geisha, and an expert in Roman history. She is also a polyglot, can speak and translate Latin. Fell in love with Lucius.
