= Thermae Romae (flash anime) =

Japanese anime series

Thermae Romae (Japanese: Terumae romae) is a flash anime adaptation by DLE of manga Thermae Romae, aired on Fuji TV in its Noitamina block between January 12, 2012, and January 26, 2012. The series was released on Blu-ray Disc on April 20, 2012, and included an unaired episode. The ending theme is "Thermae Roman" (テルマエ・ロマン, Terumae Roman) by Chatmonchy. Siren Visual released an English-subtitled version in Australia in October 2012. The series was licensed by Discotek Media for release in North America in 2013, and a re-release is planned on December 29, 2020, with an English dub. An original net animation advertisement of toothbrush company Reach was released on April 15, 2014.

== Characters ==
- Frogman (Japanese) and David Wald (English) as Lucius Modestus (ルシウス・モデストゥス, Rushiusu Modesutusu), a Roman thermae architect who excels in designs ends up discovering modern Japanese baths, believing them to be the baths of 'flat-faced slaves'. He uses these ideas in his own work back home, eventually inspiring others with his discoveries. His endeavours sometimes lead to unfortunate consequences, including costing him his marriage, arousing suspicion of being Emperor Hadrian's homosexual lover, and destroying businesses.
- Hiroki Tōchi (Japanese) and Christopher Guerrero (English) as Marcus Pietras (マルクス・ピエトラス, Marukusu Pietorasu), Lucius's friend and a marble sculptor. Oftentimes, he becomes Lucius's carver in his projects.
- Akio Ōtsuka (Japanese) and Jim Foronda (English) as Hadrianus (ハドリアヌス, Hadorianusu), Emperor of Roman Empire. Initially commissioned Lucius of building a private thermae, then commissioned him for more baths.
- Hiroshi Shirokuma (Japanese) and R. Bruce Elliott (English) as Lepidus (レピドゥス, Repidusu)

== Episode list (DLE) ==
No.	Title	Original release date
1	"The Roman Who Leapt Through Time" "Toki wo Kakeru Rōmajin" (時をかけるローマ人)	January 12, 2012
1	"Swan Lake" "Hakuchou no Mizu'umi" (白鳥の湖)	January 12, 2012
In Rome in the year 128 AD, a Roman named Lucius Modestus is having trouble coming up with ideas for architecture. While contemplating in a bathhouse, he discovers a strange drain than sends him to a bathhouse in Modern Japan. While confused by his surroundings, he becomes amazed by some of their innovations, such as fruit flavored milk. Taking these ideas back to Rome, he incorporates these ideas into a new bathhouse to great success. A year later, Lucius is commissioned by a sickly man to build an outdoor bath near Vesuvius. While inspecting a heated well, Lucius is once again sent to modern Japan, this time winding up in a hot spring, where he gets to sample slow cooked eggs and sake. These innovations help nurse the old man back to health.
2	"Shampoo Hat" "Sanpū Hatto" (サンプーハット)	January 19, 2012
2	"The Melancholy of the Emperor" "Koutei no Yuu'utsu" (皇帝の憂鬱)	January 19, 2012
As Lucius hears fancies about a bath closer to home, he once again ends up in modern Japan, this time in someone's bathtub. Mistaken as a foreign caretaker by the house's owner, Lucius comes to learn about more modern conveniences. After he builds a bath using this knowledge, his invention gets round to the Emperor Hadrian. There, Lucius suddenly finds himself with a strong urge to use the toilet, however he is summoned by the Emperor and has to bear it. He is to become the Emperor's new architect but he feels he is not worthy of such an honor. Not a moment later he is sent once again to modern Japan, this time in a toilet-showroom, where he sees sea life footage from a digital TV (which he interprets as an aquarium) and a modern bidet toilet. He then uses this knowledge to create these for the Emperor.
3	"The Power of Baths (First Part)" "Yu no Chikara (Zenpen)" (湯のちから・前篇)	January 26, 2012
3	"The Power of Baths (Second Part)" "Yu no Chikara (Kouhen)" (湯のちから・後篇)	January 26, 2012
Lucius is sent to a hot spring near Vesuvius to build some public baths, managing to enlighten some smelly robbers living there. When he slips up, he once again enters modern Japan, discovering a city filled with public hot spring baths. He samples the delights of an amusement stand and a ramen shop before bringing some souvenirs back to Rome, where he builds a village full of baths.
OVA1	"The Fascination of Pharos" "Miwaku no Farosu" (魅惑のファロス)	April 20, 2012
Lucius is met with phallus worshipping in both past and present times.
OVA2	"I Want to Slip Honestly" "Hitasura Suberitai" (ひたすら滑りたい)	April 20, 2012
OVA2	"The Three Office Lady Sisters' Thermae Murder Mystery" "Sanshimai OL Terumae Satsujinjiken" (三姉妹OLテルマエ殺人事件)	April 20, 2012
OVA2	"I Want to Feel Smooth" "Subesube ni Naritai" (スベスベになりたい)	April 20, 2012
In the first part Lucius is sent to a water park looking for something for the children to do, in the second part he happens to resurface at a murder scene and in the last part he visits a spa.
ONA	"Pietrada's Marriage" "Pietorāda no Kekkon" (ピエトラーダの結婚)	April 13, 2014
Lucius is beseeched by his friend, Marcus, to help his younger sister, Pietrada, whose bad teeth turns away any potential marriage candidates. Travelling to modern day times again, Lucius discovers the wonder of toothbrushes.
