= Overlord season 1 =

2015 Japanese television season

Overlord
- Season 1
- Key visual
- No. of episodes: 13

Release
- Original network: AT-X
- Original release: July 7 – September 25, 2015

Season chronology
- Next → Overlord II

Overlord is an anime series based on the light novel series of the same name written by Kugane Maruyama and illustrated by so-bin. The series is directed by Naoyuki Itō, written by Yukie Sugawara, and music composed by Shūji Katayama. The series aired from July 7 to September 25, 2015, on AT-X, Tokyo MX, Sun TV, KBS Kyoto, TV Aichi, and BS11.

The opening theme is "Clattanoia" by OxT, and the ending theme is "L.L.L." by Myth & Roid.

== Episodes ==
No. overall	No. in season	Title	Directed by	Written by	Original release date	Ref.
1	1	"End and Beginning"; Transliteration: "Owari to Hajimari" (Japanese: 終わりと始まり)	Kunihiro Wakabayashi	Yukie Sugawara	July 7, 2015	
YGGDRASIL is a Dive Massively Multiplayer Online Role Playing Game released in 2126 that is to be discontinued after 12 years of standing as the top DMMO-RPG. Momonga, guildmaster of Ainz Ooal Gown, is conversing with guild mate Herohero during the last moments of YGGDRASIL in their guild hall, The Great Tomb of Nazarick. Herohero bids farewell to Momonga and logs out. Momonga is enraged about his friends leaving the game, but cools down after noting that they did not abandon the guild – it was that they had real life issues to deal with. Now all alone in Nazarick, except for NPCs and still engrossed in the memories of the past, he takes the Staff of Ainz Ooal Gown and heads to the throne room. On the way, he orders Sebas and the Battle Maids to follow him there, where he meets Albedo. On a whim, he changes her settings to be in love with him as its originally setting created by Tabula was that she was an absolute "bitch". Momonga closes his eyes to await the forced logout by server, but realizes something is wrong as he is not ejected and remains in the game. He discovers, to his astonishment, that the NPCs have developed their own personalities and can be directly communicated with as if they were humans. Albedo, in particular, begins exhibiting the personality traits based on the settings Momonga made, much to his shock. Momonga attempts to test the limits of this new discovery but is forcefully calmed down. He also notices he can smell now, which was not possible in the game so far. Dazed at all that has occurred, Momonga orders Albedo to call every guardian except those from 4th and 8th floor to meet him in the arena floor. He teleports himself to the arena to test his skills. There he meets the Floor Guardians Aura Bella Fiora and Mare Bella Fiore Momonga and asks them to help him test out his newfound powers. After they finish sparing with the Fire Elemental Spirit, they are given refreshments by Momonga, at which they are surprised. Shortly after, the Floor Guardians enter the Arena and introduces themselves.
2	2	"Floor Guardians"; Transliteration: "Kaisō shugo-sha" (Japanese: 階層守護者)	Shūji Miyazaki	Yukie Sugawara	July 14, 2015	
The Floor Guardians of Nazarick enter the Arena and introduces themselves. Arriving first is Shalltear Bloodfallen: a true vampire and Guardian of the 1st, 2nd, and 3rd Floor; then enters Cocytus: The Guardian of the Fifth floor, whom Momonga tells is the definition of the Warrior; finally enters Demiurge: The Guardian of the seventh floor, a true demon. Along with him enters Albedo: the overseer of the Floor Guardians. Upon arriving, they all at once pledge their loyalty to Momonga, to which he is greatly pleased. Sebas comes and reports that the guild hall was somehow moved to an unknown location. Astonished by this revelation, Momonga starts by strengthening their defences and requests Mare to use his earth magic to blend the Great Tomb of Nazarick into the surrounding area. He gives the Guardians their respective orders before leaving. The Guardians, astonished at his dark aura of instilling fear and intelligence, leave to do their assigned works while Momonga continues to test his capabilities in the New World. He heads outside with Demiurge and glances at the world, jokingly commenting that conquering the world might not be a bad thing, to which Demiurge misunderstands this as an actual order.
3	3	"The Battle of Carne Village"; Transliteration: "Karune-mura no tatakai" (Japanese: カルネ村の戦い)	Naoyuki Itō	Yukie Sugawara	July 21, 2015	
While using a magic mirror to examine nearby lands with the help of Sebas, Momonga discovers a village under attack from knights of unknown affiliation. At first, Momonga intends to ignore the slaughter. But when he remembers the debt he owed to his guild mate 'Touch Me', he decides to save the villagers and arrives there through a gate, which make the soldiers afraid. As they were about to kill two siblings, Momonga casts a high tier spell, easily killing one of the soldiers and uses them to make a death knight. Momonga orders the knight to kill every soldier in the area. Meanwhile, a group of warriors led by a man named Gazef encounter sacked villages, looking for survivors.
4	4	"Ruler of Death"; Transliteration: "Shi no shihai-sha" (Japanese: 死の支配者)	Masaki Matsumura	Yukie Sugawara	July 28, 2015	
Nigun Grid Luin, the captain of the Sunlight Scripture of the Slane Theocracy marches on Carne Village with a team of magic casters to kill Gazef. Realizing this, Gazef attempts to convince Ainz Ooal Gown (Momonga's new name) to defend the village to no avail, so he sets out with his men to confront them while Ainz assists the villagers in escaping. Gazef and his men fight bravely, but they are beaten severely by Nigun's men. Before Nigun's magic casters can deal the final blow, an item that Ainz had previously given Gazef activates and swaps the latter and his men with Ainz and Albedo. Ainz reveals that his whole scheme was to test the power that the Slane Theocracy's men had, and that he was using Gazef to do so. Immediately, Ainz begins effortlessly batting away the attacks of Nigun's men, much to their shock. This leads Nigun to activate a 7th tier spell, summoning a powerful angel to attack Ainz. The attack barely inflicts pain on Ainz, which he scoffs about. Albedo, however, is infuriated that someone hurt her "beloved" Ainz and threatens to massacre them. Ainz calms her down, and then proceeds to obliterate the angel with a black hole. Dumbfounded and horrified at the power Ainz displayed, Nigun begins to beg for his life. Laughing, Ainz responds by quoting one of Nigun's previous statements. After the battle, Ainz returns to Nazarick to announce his name change and their goal of spreading his new name, Ainz Ooal Gown, across these new lands. However, his servants misinterpret this as a declaration that he wishes to rule the world.
5	5	"Two Adventurers"; Transliteration: "Futari no bōken-sha" (Japanese: 二人の冒険者)	Mihiro Yamaguchi	Yukie Sugawara	August 4, 2015	
Ainz and Narberal (one of the Battle Maids of Nazarick) take on the aliases of Momon and Nabe, respectively, in order to join the adventurer's guild in the city of E-Rantel to learn more about the world. Several complications arise when "Momon" finds it troublesome to keep "Nabe" from blowing their cover while rowdy adventurers try to win Nabe's attention (which only annoys her). Meanwhile, a dangerous necromancer and a bloodthirsty female assassin plot a takeover of E-Rantel.
6	6	"Journey"; Transliteration: "Tabiji" (Japanese: 旅路)	Ryōichi Kuratani	Yukie Sugawara	August 11, 2015	
Momon, Nabe, and the Swords of Darkness are hired by Nfirea to accompany him to Carne Village. On the journey, the party is attacked by a large group of Goblins and Ogres. A battle plan is made quickly; while the Swords of Darkness pick off the goblins, Momon and Nabe would eliminate the ogres. As the fight proceeds, Momon immediately breaks formation and instantly bifurcates several ogres to the shock of the Swords of Darkness. The other goblins and ogres panic and retreat at the sight of Momon cutting down their kin. Later, around a campfire, Momon and Nabe share a tense moment with the rest of the group when one of the Swords inquires about Momon's past.
7	7	"Wise King of Forest"; Transliteration: "Mori no ken-ō" (Japanese: 森の賢王)	Masayuki Ōzeki	Yukie Sugawara	August 18, 2015	
Momon's group arrives at Carne Village and meet Enri Emmot and her Goblin Troop. Enri tells Nfirea why the village is fortified and she also mentions Ainz Ooal Gown, the red potion that healed her, and Albedo which leads Nfirea to conclude that Momon is Ainz Ooal Gown. Nfirea apologizes to Ainz for deceiving him and Ainz tells him not to reveal his identity to anyone. Overhearing this, Nabe immediately becomes distraught as she was responsible for Nfirea uncovering Momon's identity. Later, as Nfirea requests the Swords of Darkness along with Momon and Nabe to help him collect medical herbs in the forest, Momon learns of the "Wise King of the Forest", a supposedly powerful magical creature. Seeing an opportunity to gain fame, Momon contacts Aura back in Nazarick and has her draw out the beast from its den. The beast angrily runs out of its den and charges Momon. Momon immediately recognizes the beast as a giant Djungarian hamster, a species that one of his guild mates kept as a pet in real life. Noting how much of a disappointment the Wise King was, Momon instead opts to use one of his skills to scare the beast into submission. Aura, seeing this, asks if she can take its pelt, but Momon decides to make the King his servant instead. Naming the Wise King Hamsuke, Momon introduces Hamsuke to the Swords of Darkness who are in awe over its wisdom. Momon, however, is floored by their perception of Hamsuke as he can not see her as anything other than a giant cute hamster. After successfully collecting the herbs, the group returns to E-Rantel. Momon and Nabe then part ways with the group to register Hamsuke while the Swords of Darkness return to the pharmacy for their payment from Nfirea. The group is intercepted by Clementine, however, who menacingly mocks the group.
8	8	"Twin Swords of Slashing Death"; Transliteration: "Shi o kirisaku sōken" (Japanese: 死を切り裂く双剣)	Kunihiro Wakabayashi	Yukie Sugawara	August 25, 2015	
Clementine appears in front of Nfirea to kidnap him. The Swords of Darkness attempt to buy time for Nfirea and Ninya to escape but Khajiit blocks their way of escape. After registering Hamsuke at the Adventurer's Guild, Momon's group meets Lizzie Bareare and guides them to her house. However, they find the Swords of Darkness turned into zombies. After killing them off, Momon immediately deduces three things: first, whoever did it did not hide the bodies, meaning they did not care to cover their tracks. Second, a piercing weapon was used to kill the Swords. Third, their target was Nfirea. With this knowledge, Momon asks Lizzie if she wants to hire him to save her grandson at the cost of all she has. Agreeing to the pseudo "Faustian Contract", Momon uses several locator spells to track Clementine to an old cemetery on the edge of town. Using Crystal Monitor, Momon discovers an undead army with Nfirea at its center. Ordering Lizzie to alert the guild and town, Momon immediately rushes to the cemetery. Upon arriving at the gate, Momon astonishes the guards by single-handedly annihilating the undead attacking them despite being only a copper plate. Along with Nabe and Hamsuke, Momon carves a path to Khajiit and Clementine. Confronting them, he mocks Khajiit and demands that they hand over Nfirea while also drawing out Clementine. Momon then leaves Nabe to deal with Khajiit while he and Clementine leave to take their battle elsewhere. As Momon and Clementine are walking, the latter attempts to psychologically taunt Momon. Momon brushes it off with laughter, and then enrages Clementine by declaring he does not need to fight seriously to kill her.
9	9	"The Dark Warrior"; Transliteration: "Shikkoku no senshi" (Japanese: 漆黒の戦士)	Masaki Matsumura	Yukie Sugawara	September 1, 2015	
Momon and Nabe begin their respective fights against Khajiit and Clementine. Khajiit summons two skeletal dragons that he declares are impervious to magic, but this is proven partially false as Nabe easily obliterates both the dragons and Khajiit with a seventh tier spell (as the dragons can only block six and below.) Momon, continuing to give Clementine a handicap, clashes with her repeatedly. Furious at how Momon repeatedly mocks her as weak, Clementine charges Momon with a full force attack and stabs him in both eyes with elemental strikes. Momon brushes off the move to Clementine's shock and pins her with a one-armed bear hug. Revealing his true nature as an undead, Ainz torments Clementine that she was defeated by a magic caster that did not even use magic. Visibly shaken, Clementine snaps and flails relentlessly while thrashing at Ainz to release her. Her efforts prove futile, and Ainz crushes her body with both arms, killing her. Ainz then returns victorious with Narberal, Hamsuke, and Nfirea, and for his efforts is immediately promoted to Mithril rank. As he discusses his new promotion with Narberal, Ainz contacts Albedo who alerts him that Shalltear Bloodfallen has rebelled against Nazarick.
10	10	"True Vampire"; Transliteration: "Shinso" (Japanese: 真祖)	Mihiro Yamaguchi	Yukie Sugawara	September 8, 2015	
Shalltear is outside Nazarick, trying to find Martial Arts users with Sebas and Solution. After encountering some bandits, she sends Sebas and Solution back to the kingdom and goes to the bandits' base, where she confronts their leader, Brain Unglaus, who knows Martial Arts. However. he is so weak compared to her that she does not even realize that he is using them. She then goes into a Blood Frenzy and kills all of the bandits except Brain, who escapes. She tries to follow him, but encounters Adventurers, who are there to fight the bandits. She kills all of them except Brita, who had Ainz's red potion, which makes Shalltear believe that Ainz wanted her alive. When she realizes that one adventurer was set to run away beforehand should it all go bad, she tries to find him, but ends up being attacked by some unknown people who attack her with a weapon; but not before she manages to wound the user. After Ainz hears that she has betrayed Nazarick, he decides to go to her and find out why.
11	11	"Confusion and Understanding"; Transliteration: "Konran to haaku" (Japanese: 混乱と把握)	Ryōichi Kuratani	Yukie Sugawara	September 15, 2015	
Ainz and Albedo find Shalltear and Ainz states that even though Shalltear is under mind control, she was left behind without any orders. Ainz attempts to use a Super Tier magic item to free her, but it fails. Because of this, Ainz realizes that Shalltear has been mind controlled by a World Class Item, the strongest of all types of items. He decides to equip the Floor Guardians with the World Class Items that Nazarick has to protect them before he goes to fight Shalltear; but he also states that Shalltear is one of the Strongest NPCs in Nazarick and that he might not be able to beat her.
12	12	"The Bloody Valkyrie"; Transliteration: "Senketsu no ikusaotome" (Japanese: 鮮血の戦乙女)	Masaki Matsumura	Yukie Sugawara	September 22, 2015	
Ainz, while being observed by the other available Floor Guardians from Nazarick, finally goes and confronts Shalltear, who proves to be on par with Ainz. But Ainz beats her with a special move, after which she uses a skill to prevent her death, at the cost of using up all her mana. However, Ainz then states how everything has been going according to his plan.
13	13	"Player VS Non Player Character" (Japanese: PVN)	Kunihiro Wakabayashi	Yukie Sugawara	September 29, 2015	
Ainz and Shalltear Bloodfallen continue their fight. However it is revealed that outcome of their fight was already predicted by Ainz. Using the knowledge about Shalltear, provided by her creator and his friend Peroronchino, he had the whole battle preplanned. With his MP reduced, he changed to a warrior class and used the World Champion armor. Then using various other cash shop items and finally using a super tier spell, Ainz defeats and kills Shalltear. Then back at Nazarick, Ainz resurrects Shalltear using 500 million gold. However, Shalltear has no memory of her time under mind control, although it is revealed that the Slane Theocracy was responsible for it. Momon and Nabe return to the guild to look for a new job, and it is shown that he has been promoted directly to adamantite class, making them the third Adamantite party in the kingdom.

== Home media release ==
=== Japanese ===
Media Factory (Region 2, Japan)
Vol.	Discs	Episodes	Release date	Ref.
1	1	1–3	September 25, 2015	
2	1	4–5	October 28, 2015	
3	2	6–7	November 25, 2015	
4	1	8–9	December 25, 2015	
5	2	10–11	January 27, 2016	
6	2	12–13	February 24, 2016	

=== English ===
Funimation (Region 1, USA)
Vol.	Discs	Episodes	Release date	Ref.
Season 1	2	1–13	August 14, 2018	
