= Thermae Romae Novae =

2022 Netflix original net animation series

テルマエ・ロマエ ノヴァエ
- Genre: Comedy
- Original net animation
- Directed by: Tetsuya Tatamitani
- Written by: Yūichirō Momose
- Music by: ryo Kawasaki
- Studio: NAZ
- Licensed by: Netflix
- Released: March 28, 2022
- Episodes: 11

Thermae Romae Novae (テルマエ・ロマエ ノヴァエ) is an original net animation series adaptation by NAZ of the Japanese manga series Thermae Romae. It was announced during Netflix Anime Festival 2020 and premiered on Netflix on March 28, 2022. The series is directed by Tetsuya Tatamitani and written by Yūichirō Momose.

Each episode also has a live action section where author Mari Yamazaki explores different hot springs in Japan at the end of the episode. The opening theme is "Toreador Song ~An Aria for Bath House Manners~" (闘牛士の歌 ～温泉マナーのアリア～, Tōgyūshi no Uta ~Onsen Manner no Aria~) by Paolo Andrea Di Pietro.

== Plot ==
Lucius Modestus, a proud bathhouse architect in ancient Rome, struggles in his profession after running out of new ideas. Seeking relief, he visits a public bath, where an unexpected incident causes him to be transported through a hidden passage to modern-day Japan. There, Lucius encounters contemporary Japanese bathhouses and is astonished by their advanced designs, technologies, and cultural practices surrounding bathing.

Each time Lucius returns to Rome, he attempts to recreate the innovations he has observed in Japan using the limited materials and knowledge available in his era. Although his reproductions are often imperfect, their originality and ingenuity earn widespread admiration, allowing him to renew his reputation and secure many new commissions.

== Characters ==
- Kenjiro Tsuda/David Wald as Lucius Modestus (ルシウス・モデストゥス, Rushiusu Modesutusu), a Roman thermae architect who excels in designs ends up discovering modern Japanese baths, believing them to be the baths of 'flat-faced slaves'. He uses these ideas in his own work back home, eventually inspiring others with his discoveries. His endeavours sometimes lead to unfortunate consequences, including costing him his marriage, arousing suspicion of being Emperor Hadrian's homosexual lover, and destroying businesses.
- Chikahiro Kobayashi/Chris Guerrero as Marcus Pietras (マルクス・ピエトラス, Marukusu Pietorasu), Lucius's friend and a marble sculptor. Oftentimes, he becomes Lucius's carver in his projects.
- Tsutomu Isobe/Richard Epcar as Hadrianus (ハドリアヌス, Hadorianusu), Emperor of Roman Empire. Initially commissioned Lucius of building a private thermae, then commissioned him for more baths.
- Yong Yea as Lepidus (レピドゥス, Repidusu)

== Episode list ==
No. overall	No. in season	Title	Directed by	Written by	Original release date
1	1	"All Baths Lead to Rome" (Japanese: 全ての風呂はローマに通ず)	Tetsuya Tatamitani	Yûichirô Momose	March 28, 2022
A small and weak kid called Lucius, goes with his grandfather to the bathhouse he designed, where he learns the importance of the work of his grandfather (and late father). During his stay he slips and he awakes in a very strange place. After he comes back he realizes he wants to follow his ancestor steps and he is determined to build bathhouses that pulls him to study them in Athens.
2	2	"The Thermae Architect Who Leapt Through Time" (Japanese: 時をかける銭湯技師 ルシウス・モデストゥス)	Tetsuya Tatamitani	Yûichirô Momose	March 28, 2022
In Rome in the year 128 AD, a Roman named Lucius Modestus is having trouble coming up with ideas for architecture. While contemplating in a bathhouse, he discovers a strange drain than sends him to a bathhouse in Modern Japan. While confused by his surroundings, he becomes amazed by some of their innovations, such as fruit flavored milk. Taking these ideas back to Rome, he incorporates these ideas into his grandfather's bathhouse with successful results. However, the old bathhouse where he slipped is closed.
3	3	"Lucius Builds an Outdoor Bath" (Japanese: ルシウス、露天風呂を作る)	Tetsuya Tatamitani	Yûichirô Momose	March 28, 2022
Some time later, Lucius is commissioned by the sick and old Consul Lepidus to build an outdoor bath near Mount Vesuvius. While inspecting a heated well, Lucius is once again sent to modern Japan, this time winding up in a hot spring, where he gets to sample slow cooked eggs and sake, while also learning that the natural settings allow monkeys to bath as well. Also he learns how to redirect the dangerous hot water from the spring to make it more bearable for bathing. These innovations lead Lepidus to improve his health and get married, while also Lucius learns, to his shock, that one monkey from Japan is bathing there.
4	4	"Lucius Builds an Indoor Bath" (Japanese: ルシウス、内風呂を作る)	Tetsuya Tatamitani	Yûichirô Momose	March 28, 2022
As Lucius learns that his friend Marcus spends too much time bringing his master to the bathhouse, he begin to wonder how to build an indoor bath. He once again ends up in modern Japan, this time in someone's bathtub. Mistaken as a foreign caretaker by the house's owner, Lucius comes to learn about more modern conveniences. He builds an indoor bath with this knowledge and Marcus is able to bring his work on time for Emperor Hadrian, when his servant learns of the indoor bath, Hadrianus becomes interested of Lucius's work.
5	5	"Lucius Builds a Bath in Emperor Hadrian's Villa" (Japanese: ルシウス、ハドリアヌス帝の別荘に風呂を作る)	Tetsuya Tatamitani	Yûichirô Momose	March 28, 2022
Lucius is summoned by Emperor Hadrian, and he became so nervous that he finds himself with a strong urge to use the toilet, however he has to bear it. The Emperor asks him to build a bath in his Villa as long as he needs to have a private space to think about the Roman incursion in Jerusalem Bar Kokhba revolt. Some moments later he is sent once again to modern Japan, this time in a toilet-showroom, where he sees sea life footage from a digital TV (which he interprets as an aquarium) and a modern bidet toilet. He then uses this knowledge to create these for the Emperor who become impressed for his work and asks him to go with Jerusalem with him.
6	6	"Lucius Builds a Hot Stone Spa" (Japanese: ルシウス、岩盤浴を作る)	Tetsuya Tatamitani	Yûichirô Momose	March 28, 2022
During Hadrianus campaign in Jerusalem, the soldiers become sick of drinking poisoned wine and tire and hurt from the battles. Lucius try to build a hot spring to help the army get healed and he slips back again to Modern Japan where he finds himself in a healing spa where the hot stones are used to improve the circulation of the body and reduce the pain. He got sick by drinking expired sake, but this allows him to figure out the cure for his poisoned partners. The success of the project makes Hadrianus name him his personal bath builder, but Lucius asks him to go back to Rome to see his wife.
7	7	"Lucius appears on the Tokaido Road in the Edo Period" (Japanese: ルシウス、江戸末期の東海道に現る)	Tetsuya Tatamitani	Yûichirô Momose	March 28, 2022
In the road home, Lucius finds himself in a very unwelcoming tavern where the service is poor. While trying to take a bath, he slips to the Edo-era Tokyo, where he notices the onsen has both men and women bathing together. He is invited to stay in a ryokan where the devoted employees allows him to see the conveniences of good services. A woman working there tries to seduces him but he slips back to his time where he inputs his knowledge to improve the services in the tavern, something that Hadrianus appreciates when he goes to the tavern some time later.
8	8	"Lucius Learns Bathing Etiquette in Japan" (Japanese: ルシウス、入浴の礼儀作法を日本で知る)	Tetsuya Tatamitani	Yûichirô Momose	March 28, 2022
Lucius notices his grandfather's bathhouse has lost clients due to some foreign soldiers making bad use of the place. When confronting them he slips back to modern Japan where he tries to defend a peaceful bathhouse against a trio of rude tourists. After a useless fight, both the Roman and the tourists learn that the rules are shown in the place as pictures, something that Lucius takes back to Rome and helps him allow the foreigners to make good use of the place.
9	9	"Lucius Meets a Fellow Architect in Japan" (Japanese: ルシウス、平たい顔の同業者と出会う)	Tetsuya Tatamitani	Yûichirô Momose	March 28, 2022
Lucius is summoned to create a bath house for the poor people that is expected to be covered in vulgar details, when confronting his patron he slips into the modern Japan to meet a young architect tasked to build a Roman style bath house where his rich patron is tasking to input some vulgar and blinky elements. However, when watching the moon and the design of the Kinkaku-ji temple in his borrowed shirt, Lucius comes with an idea that helps to show luxury and modesty at the same time in both places to show respect to goddess Diana.
10	10	"Lucius Builds a Theme Bath" (Japanese: ルシウス、アミューズメント風呂を作る)	Tetsuya Tatamitani	Yûichirô Momose	March 28, 2022
Lucius is tasked to build a new bathhouse for the Emperor's adopted son and heir Lucius Aielus Caesar, but accepting this project makes his wife Livia leaving him for good. While not happy with Aielus's behavior, Lucius goes to the Baths of Trajan to meditate about it but he ends pushed to the water by a group of children playing there. He resurfaces into a water park in Japan where he learns about slides, pools for kids and wine baths. His new bath house becomes a success bringing popularity to Aielus, while also bringing the kids and adults a place to have fun with water.
11	11	"Lucius Builds a Spa Town" (Japanese: ルシウス、温泉街を作る)	Tetsuya Tatamitani	Yûichirô Momose	March 28, 2022
Three senators, envious of Hadrian's success with the thermal baths, decides to get rid of Lucius by sending him to investigate a good place to put a bathhouse near Mt. Vesuvius. Lucius, unaware of the danger, ends surrounded by bandits. Lucius convinces them to help him build a bath and everyone ends enjoying the place. When the bandits wonder if they really found a treasure, Lucius slips into a modern hot spring town in Japan, where he learns that the economy of the place is not only based on the hot springs, but also in the food and the souvenirs sold there. This allows Lucius to build a hot spring town near Mt. Vesuvius that bring work and prosperity to the bandits. His success is repaid by Hadrian by bringing Livia with him. She finally gets convinced about all the good work he did for Rome, while he finally recognizes that he distanced for her due to his hard work, allowing them to reconcile.
