= Overlord season 4 =

2022 Japanese television season

Overlord IV
- Season 4
- Key visual
- No. of episodes: 13

Release
- Original network: AT-X
- Original release: July 5 – September 27, 2022

Season chronology
- ← Previous; Overlord III

Overlord is an anime series based on the light novel series of the same name written by Kugane Maruyama and illustrated by so-bin. On May 8, 2021, a fourth season was announced with the staff and cast members returning to reprise their roles. It aired from July 5 to September 27, 2022. The opening theme is "HOLLOW HUNGER" by OxT while the ending theme is "No Man's Dawn" by Mayu Maeshima. On July 18, 2022, Crunchyroll announced an English dub for the fourth season, which began streaming on July 19.

== Episodes ==
No. overall	No. in season	Title	Directed by	Written by	Original release date	Ref.
40	1	"Sorcerous Nation of Ainz Ooal Gown"; Transliteration: "Ainzu Ūru Goun Madō Koku" (Japanese: アインズ・ウール・ゴウン魔導国)	Kyōsuke Takada	Yukie Sugawara	July 5, 2022	TBA
Ainz is depressed to be surrounded only by loyal servants and misses his former guild members. Ainz establishes an orphanage in E-Rantel to identify talented individuals at a young age for the benefit of Nazarick. He also hires widows of the dead Re-Estize soldiers as workers to provide them with a living. Albedo clashes with Aura over spending time with Ainz; making Ainz consider sending Aura and Mare to the Dark elves to make friends. Albedo reveals E-Rantel is suffering a lack of resources as merchants are too scared to visit now Ainz is king. Albedo is granted permission to visit Re-Estize. As Pandora's Actor still has an annoying personality, Ainz suggests he would be proud if he grew beyond his original programming, though he asks this be kept secret in case the Floor Guardians think he is showing favouritism. Pandora's Actor reveals that while posing as Momon many humans have been asking him about Ainz. Ainz worries the Floor Guardians still see humans as lesser creatures. Ainz approaches Ainzach, Master of the local adventurer's guild. Since Ainz's Death Knights keep the peace a lot of the adventurers security work has dried up, so Ainz asks to absorb the guild into his kingdom and put the adventurers to work exploring unknown lands and establishing diplomatic ties with undiscovered kingdoms. Ainz announces his plan now is to rule both human and non-human species in a kingdom where all can live together in peace.
41	2	"Re-Estize Kingdom"; Transliteration: "Ri Esutīze Ōkoku" (Japanese: リ・エスティーゼ王国)	Yasumi Mikamoto	Yukie Sugawara	July 12, 2022	TBA
Ainz worries his plan to establish a peaceful kingdom might clash with his servants' plans for world domination. Princess Renner establishes an orphanage in Re-Estize to identify magically talented orphans. As Prince Barbro is still missing, his brother Zanac becomes acting crown prince of Re-Estize. Deeply affected by Gazef's death, Brain seeks out children with sword skills to potentially replace Gazef. Albedo arrives in Re-Estize and meets with Zanac. At her welcoming party, a minor noble named Phillip Montserrat, enamored by Albedo's beauty and seeking to improve his family standing, invites Albedo to a party. His father is furious as Phillip's older brother died fighting against Ainz, but Phillip is adamant establishing a relationship with the Sorcerous Kingdom will benefit them. A rich commoner named Hilma Cygnaeus has been supporting Phillip financially and hopes to profit from him once he inherits his father's title. Albedo is completely disgusted when Phillip touches her but Phillip, believing he made a good impression, shares with Hilma his plan to seduce and marry Albedo. Hilma, who is secretly under Albedo's influence, offers to have Phillip murdered and replaced, but Albedo lets him live temporarily. Hilma and Albedo secretly meet with the nobles who actually matter and begin planning to alleviate the shortage of supplies in E-Rantel. Princess Renner, who established the orphanage under Ainz's orders, is rewarded by Albedo for her loyalty.
42	3	"Baharuth Empire"; Transliteration: "Baharusu Teikoku" (Japanese: バハルス帝国)	Kyōsuke Takada	Yukie Sugawara	July 19, 2022	TBA
Before Albedo had departed for Re-Estize Ainz gave her a world item, Ginnungagap, to prevent the brainwashing that affected Shalltear. Albedo was then surprised when, after requesting a goodbye kiss, Ainz kissed her on the cheek. Elsewhere, the Cardinals of the Slane Theocracy discuss the Sorcerous Kingdom and Emperor Jircniv. Their spy, the Thousand League Astrologer, secludes herself in despair, having seen Ainz use 11th Tier magic to massacre 130,000 men. Without enough information, the Cardinals decide to spy on Jircniv. Meanwhile, Jircniv is unable to handle the stress of dealing with Ainz and losing the war has caused his hair to begin falling out. Jircniv hopes the Slane Theocracy will be his secret allies against Ainz, so he hires the Adamantite adventurers Silver Thread Bird as guards while meeting their representatives. At a gladiatorial display in the coliseum, Jircniv meets the representatives but in the coliseum the Empire's strongest gladiator, the Warrior King, is suddenly challenged by Ainz. Jircniv panics as he believes Ainz somehow manipulated the entire meeting to force Jircniv to either support Ainz, or publicly betray him and ask the Theocracy for an alliance. The Theocracy accuse Jircniv of conspiracy but remain steadfast in opposing Ainz who, as an undead, is the enemy of their Temple. Ainz leaves for his duel and Jircniv begs the High Priests to at least watch Ainz fight and maybe discover his weakness.
43	4	"The Ruler of Conspiracy"; Transliteration: "Bōryaku no Tōchisha" (Japanese: 謀略の統治者)	Masaki Matsumura	Yukie Sugawara	July 26, 2022	TBA
Following Albedo's departure to Re-Estize, Ainz decided upon a publicity stunt to show his power and mercy. Along with Ainzach, Ainz smuggled himself into Jircniv's Empire. Ainzach pointed out hiring experienced adventurers could be problematic, so it would benefit Ainz to train amateurs. Ainz decided a fight in the coliseum would advertise to potential trainees so Ainzach set up a meeting with a fight promoter. Ainz met with Fluder to gather information and rewarded his loyalty with a book detailing the exact nature of souls. Meeting Osk the fight promotor Ainz takes an interest in a runecrafted sword from the Dwarven Kingdom. Osk arranged for Ainz to fight the Warrior King. Now, in the present, Ainz meets the Warrior King, a troll named Go-Gin who is quite intelligent. Deciding he likes Go-Gin, Ainz offers to hire him should Go-Gin lose their fight and he agrees. For the sake of fairness Ainz uses no high tier magic and equips Clementine's triple daggers. Go-Gin is thrilled to have faced someone of Ainz' strength and swears to one day reach his level. Ainz kills Go-Gin and announces to the audience his desire to train adventurers to explore the entire world and that they need not fear death in his service as he resurrects Go-Gin before their eyes. Out of desperation Jircniv requests the Empire become a vassal state of the Sorcerous Kingdom. Ainz hesitates but agrees to negotiate the details. Jircniv hopes to survive by being useful as one of Ainz' servants.
44	5	"In Pursuit of the Land of Dwarves"; Transliteration: "Dowāfu no Kuni o Motomete" (Japanese: ドワーフの国を求めて)	Masaki Matsumura	Yukie Sugawara	August 2, 2022	TBA
Albedo suggests to Demiurge that Ainz is unhappy with his plans, and Ainz wants him and Albedo to arrange for the Empire to become a vassal state. Ainz hopes to make an alliance with the Dwarven Kingdom to gain access to their rune technology. He takes Aura, Shalltear and lizardman Zenberu who has experience with dwarves. Ainz hopes the experience will broaden Shalltear's mind. In private, Ainz reveals the runes are from the Yggdrasil game and wonders if it was another player who taught them to the dwarves. Aura suggests to Shalltear that she should try to understand Ainz actions. They arrive at Feo-Raidho city, but find it abandoned except for Gondo Firebeard, a dwarf miner. Ainz explains his interest in an alliance and in runes. Gondo admits not many runesmiths remain since it is easier to use enchantments, and Dwarven society has been in decline for years. Ainz offers his support in helping the dwarves recover their pride, so Gondo swears loyalty. They encounter Quagoa, a race of mole people who eat metal to make their fur impenetrable. Ainz orders Shalltear to capture them alive and is pleased when she correctly deduces his reason for doing so. Ainz learns the Quagoa are a support force for an army led by Clan Lord Pe Riyuro who, at this very moment, is leading an army to destroy what is left of the Dwarven Kingdom.
45	6	"The Impending Crisis"; Transliteration: "Semarikuru Kiki" (Japanese: 迫りくる危機)	Norikazu Ishigōoka	Yukie Sugawara	August 9, 2022	TBA
The Quagoa army attacks the stronghold Feo Jera. Ainz arrives and offers assistance to the General, who is so desperate he accepts immediately. Ainz' Death Knights push the Quagoa back but two of them are destroyed when Quagoa pack leader Yohz destroys the bridge they are standing on, dropping them into a bottomless chasm. Ainz offers the Dwarves Regency Council a Trade Alliance as well as Ainz' guarantee of protection. Ainz also offers to reclaim the Dwarven Royal capital of Feo Berkana from the Quagoa, despite the Quagoa's numbers and a Frost Dragon living nearby, in exchange for all runesmiths relocating to his kingdom. Despite their reservations the Council agrees. Ainz meets the runesmiths and informs them he wants them to totally revive their craft and they gladly accept. Gondo is touched that rune crafting, an art practised by his family for generations, will be saved from decline. He also offers to act as guide to the Royal Capital, in exchange for Ainz' complicity in stealing a valuable book on runes from the treasury. Ainz instructs Shalltear on strategic thinking in case they meet whoever killed the two Death Knights. Ainz also looks forward to meeting a real dragon in person.
46	7	"Frost Dragon Lord"; Transliteration: "Shimo no Ryūō" (Japanese: 霜の竜王)	Kyōsuke Takada	Yukie Sugawara	August 16, 2022	TBA
Yohz reports his defeat to Pe Riyuro who visits the Frost Dragon Olasird'arc in the Royal Palace, hoping to persuade him to attack the dwarves. Olasird'arc sends one of his sons, Hejinmal, an overweight coward. Hejinmal is so scared he immediately surrenders to Ainz. After killing Olasird'arc Ainz helps Gondo steals the Rune book. Shalltear is wary of whoever killed the Death Knights, until Aura reveals Ainz always knew the Death Knights fell into the chasm, he just hid this so Shalltear would think there was a strong enemy, requiring her to think strategically. By Ainz' orders, Shalltear offers Riyuro a choice, either all 60,000 Quagoa swear loyalty, or she will kill all except 8000 males and females and 2000 children. Riyuro chooses to fight but is devastated when Shalltear kills 50,000 Quagoa. All dragons swear loyalty to Ainz, except one of Olasird'arc's sons whom Ainz kills when he attacks him. Riyuro swears loyalty and Ainz promises both dragons and Quagoa will prosper in his kingdom as long as they remain loyal. Shalltear shares what she learned from the experience and Ainz is proud of her. Ainz summons Demiurge to report on progress with the Roble Holy Kingdom. Demiurge is impressed Ainz now has both the Empire and the Dwarven Kingdoms loyalty and through a series of misunderstandings, believes Ainz has formulated plans for at least the next 10,000 years.
47	8	"An Unexpected Move"; Transliteration: "Keisangai no Itte" (Japanese: 計算外の一手)	Yasumi Mikamoto	Yukie Sugawara	August 23, 2022	TBA
Demiurge manipulates the Roble Holy Kingdom into trading with the Sorcerous Kingdom. Phillip becomes the new Baron Montserrat but his farmers are unable to farm as much food as Ainz' undead and his finances suffer when Ainz gives food to the Holy Kingdom for free so they stop buying from Phillip. One of Ainz' food deliveries is stolen and the theft traced back to Phillip after Albedo and Ainz interrogate Hilma. Hilma is surprised when Ainz blames himself instead of her and becomes devoted to him, describing his mercy to the other Eight Fingers. Albedo explains to the Floor Guardians that Phillip was supposed to incite the commoners into rebelling against the nobility; Ainz would then peacefully absorb Re-Estize into the Sorcerous Kingdom, but Phillip provoked war instead. Ainz agrees an example is required but privately is not happy his plan failed. Ainz sends a letter to the Re-Estize king, warning that the Sorcerous Kingdom, Baharuth Empire, Dwarven Kingdom, Dragon Kingdom, Roble Holy Kingdom, and a powerful figure called the Faceless all hold the Re-Estize Kingdom responsible for the attack on the transport and may declare war. King Ramposa, Zanac and his ministers are trapped between fighting a war they cannot win, or blaming everything on Phillip and hoping Ainz shows mercy. Albedo arrives and is surprised when Ramposa offers his own head in exchange for mercy for his kingdom.
48	9	"Countdown to Extinction"; Transliteration: "Metsubō e no Hajimari" (Japanese: 滅亡への始まり)	Masaki Matsumura	Yukie Sugawara	August 30, 2022	TBA
Albedo refuses Ramposa's head and declares war on Re-Estize, though she promises Ainz will use no higher tier spells. Brain, who now holds Gazef's sword Razor Edge, decides to evacuate his sword students out of Re-Estize. Demiurge moves soldiers to surround Re-Estize, preventing other countries interfering. Ainz worries victory will be too easy; since more can be learned by experiencing failure, the Floor Guardians won't actually learn anything if they win without trying. At Pestonya's request Ainz visits the Frozen Prison on Nazarick's fifth floor to see Nigredo, Albedo's older sister. Nigredo and Pestonya wish for Ainz to stop massacring humans as they believe humans have infinite potential that Ainz is wasting. Ainz agrees but points out the need to set an example of what happens to kingdoms who oppose him. He decides to massacre the coastal city of E-Naeul but leave some humans alive. Count Naeul hires the Four Armaments, mithril level adventurers, to protect E-Naeul. One of them, Lilynette, agrees to marry Naeul's twelve year old son in exchange for Naeul's family heirloom, the Five-Colour Holy Sword. Four Armaments are almost overwhelmed by two of Ainz' Death Knights, but are saved when the Death Knights are easily destroyed by an adamantite level adventurer wearing red flying armour from the adventurer party Drop of Red.
49	10	"The Last King"; Transliteration: "Saigo no Ō" (Japanese: 最後の王)	Ryūta Kawahara	Yukie Sugawara	September 6, 2022	TBA
Ainz, recognising the armour from YGGDRASIL, lets E-Naeul survive and moves his army to the Re-Estize capital to destroy it. The Blue Roses and Drop of Red, whose armour-wearing leader Azuth is Lakyus' uncle, are summoned to meet a special forces group from the Theocracy, the Black Scripture, who ask them to switch loyalty to the Theocracy to fight Ainz, but they refuse. Azuth plans to fight Ainz alone to save Re-Estize. Zanac meets with Ainz and demands to know why Ainz has ignored his attempts to surrender. Ainz admits he is using Re-Estize as an example to other kingdoms. Zanac demands to know Ainz ultimate goal, and in a moment of genuine honesty, Ainz admits he is seeking happiness. Ainz also learns Gazef's sword is with Brain at Re-Estize castle. Zanac wonders if he was ever actually fit to be a king. Returning to his army, a group of nobles are so terrified they betray him. The traitors beg Ainz for mercy and present him Zanac's severed head. Ainz demands to know where Zanac's armour is, as it also belonged to Gazef, then hands the traitors to Neuronist at the Frozen Prison, promising them they will receive mercy, that mercy being death once they have begged Neuronist to kill them to escape her expert torture. Disgusted by the nobles actions, Ainz hands his army to Cocytus and Mare with the order to completely massacre Re-Estize using any method they desire.
50	11	"Well-prepared Traps"; Transliteration: "Harimegurasaseta Wana" (Japanese: 張り巡らされた罠)	Ryūta Kawahara	Yukie Sugawara	September 13, 2022	TBA
Ramposa mourns the death of his son, believing it marks the end of his Kingdom. Shalltear retrieves Eight Fingers, including Cocco Doll whom she gives to Kyouhukou to test Cocco's loyalty. As Ainz advances on the capital, Azuth flies to stop them and fights Albedo. Ainz is ambushed by another warrior in platinum armour, Riku Aganeia, who traps Ainz in a barrier he cannot break. Ainz realises the armour is being controlled remotely, and battles Aganeia after he refuses to become a subordinate. Backed into a corner, Ainz takes the unusual decision to kneel and beg for mercy, claiming he is the victim and Re-Estize the criminals. Aganeia agrees but claims Ainz went too far so he has to die. Albedo breaks into the barrier to defend him, causing Aganeia to retreat and regroup with Azuth. Aganeia is revealed to be Tsaindorcus Vaision, the Platinum Dragon Lord. He is curious that Albedo broke the barrier while Ainz could not, meaning either Albedo possesses a World Item or she is actually stronger than Ainz. He theorizes Albedo might actually be a "Player" and Ainz an NPC, and begins making plans to destroy them both. He also considers whether to kill Azuth in order to give his YGGDRASIL armour to someone stronger. Ainz and Albedo return to Nazarick, where it is revealed "Ainz" was actually Pandora's Actor and the real Ainz was observing the battle from Nazarick. He demands Pandora's Actor tell him everything he learned about Riku Aganeia.
51	12	"Invasion of the Royal Capital"; Transliteration: "Ōto Shinkō" (Japanese: 王都侵攻)	Norikazu Ishigōoka	Yukie Sugawara	September 20, 2022	TBA
Ainz is curious about Aganeia's barrier skill, which Albedo only broke as she carries Ginnungagap, the world item Ainz gave her. Ainz concludes Aganeia must defeat them again so they can learn more, though he is reluctant in case he is killed and cannot be resurrected. Renner visits Brain, Lakyus and the Blue Roses in Re-Estize where the Blue Roses betray Lakyus, poisoning and beating her until she is too weak to resist Evileye's hypnosis. They reveal that Lakyus planned to stay in Re-Estize to fight, so they decided to take her with them by force to keep her alive. Preparing to teleport out of Re-Estize they offer to take Brain and Renner with them to safety in a distant kingdom wiped out centuries ago, which they decline. Brain in particular refuses as he hopes to duel Ainz, but he gives Gazef's sword to Renner and Climb to return to Ramposa. Cocytus and Aura arrive and begin destroying the city. Brain, while searching for Ainz, encounters Cocytus who agrees to duel him after a brief introduction. Despite his training and increased abilities, Brain is killed instantly. Cocytus is impressed at Brain's skill and warrior spirit. Following Ainz' lessons on strategic thinking, Cocytus reasons that Brain might have value, so he collects Brain's sword as a trophy and has his body frozen to potentially be resurrected later, should Ainz wish it.
52	13	"The Witch of the Falling Kingdom"; Transliteration: "Mekkoku no Majo" (Japanese: 滅国の魔女)	Kyōsuke Takada	Yukie Sugawara	September 27, 2022	TBA
As the attack on capital continues, Renner convinces Ramposa have Climb hide the royal treasures around the city, hoping Ainz will want to obtain them and thus spare more people. Elsewhere, Aura raids the city's magician's guild. After completing his mission, Climb returns to the palace only to find Ainz on the throne and Ramposa dead. Believing Ainz [Charmed] Renner into killing her father, Climb challenges the Sorcerer King to a duel but is easily killed. However, he is later resurrected and finds that Renner is a demon now. While Renner claims that she was forced to swear loyalty to Ainz, a later conversation with Albedo reveals that she willingly sold out her country. Renner asks Climb to become a demon like her so that she wouldn't be alone, which he accepts. Meanwhile, Albedo visits Phillip, who expects thanks for providing her a casus belli. Instead, Albedo tortures him to death, revealing that Phillip's father requested that she punish him for his actions. In the aftermath of the war, Ainz meets Marquis Raeven and puts him in charge of the Kingdom's former territory. The Sorcerer King also asks the marquis if this conflict made the world understand the foolishness of opposing him, to which he affirms that it did, leaving the Overlord satisfied with this outcome.
