= Overlord season 3 =

2018 Japanese television season

Overlord III
- Season 3
- Key visual
- No. of episodes: 13

Release
- Original network: AT-X
- Original release: July 11 – October 2, 2018

Season chronology
- ← Previous; Overlord II Next → Overlord IV

Overlord is an anime series based on the light novel series of the same name written by Kugane Maruyama and illustrated by so-bin. The third season aired from July 11 to October 2, 2018.

The opening theme is "VORACITY" by MYTH & ROID, and the ending theme song is "Silent Solitude" by OxT.

== Episodes ==
No. overall	No. in season	Title	Directed by	Written by	Original release date (Note: Tokyo MX listed the broadcast times as Tuesday nights at 24:30, meaning the first broadcast technically occurred on Wednesday at 12:30 am JST. Dates in this article reflect the actual calendar date of the broadcast.)	Ref.
27	1	"A Ruler's Melancholy"; Transliteration: "Shihaisha no Yūutsu" (Japanese: 支配者の憂鬱)	Tatsuya Shiraishi	Yukie Sugawara	July 11, 2018	
Following the events in Re-Estize, Ainz has some of the Floor Guardians take a day off. The ladies (Albedo, Shalltear, and Aura) spend time by the Sixth Floor Lake where Albedo learns she can not ride her Bicorn mount summon due to her being a "pure maiden"- to the other two's shock; while Ainz sends a memo to the male Floor Guardians to meet later for a bath house gathering for relaxation. Later on, as Ainz is in his personal quarters practicing his "Overlord Posturing" he exits to meet with Mare and Albedo; but after a heartfelt admission of joy over having them in his life, Albedo succumbs to her lust and tries to have sex with Ainz in his office. It is with the total efforts of the guards and Mare that Albedo was removed. In the evening, the men are relaxing in the spa house, but hearing Albedo blatantly try to climb the wall, when a defense golem programmed by Luci★Fer attacks them for "lacking bathing manners"; Ainz orders the male floor guardians to help the ladies, internally hoping next time they will have more time to relax.
28	2	"Carne Village Once More"; Transliteration: "Karune-mura Futatabi" (Japanese: カルネ村再び)	Kazuaki Terasawa	Yukie Sugawara	July 18, 2018	
Ainz brings together the NPCs to review the grand plan overall with Demiurge recounting; when really he just wants to learn the demon's thought process. It is revealed that all the NPCs are planning world domination, with Ainz completely oblivious. As Demiurge states this was Ainz's goal, ascertained by his actions, starting with Carne Village being subjugated with no casualties and having the residences living peacefully. Thus, it meant Ainz wanted world domination, and experimenting on ruling his subjects. Meanwhile at Carne Village, Nfirea is spending entire nights developing a potion for Ainz, while Enri is caring for the Goblin Troop as they teach and protect the village; Enri has even given names to each goblin. The only new resident to the village was Brita, who quit as an adventurer after surviving her encounter with Shalltear. After running low on medicinal herbs, Enri, Nfirea, and three Goblins search the forest for said herb. Finding a growing patch, they see a wounded Hobgoblin child being hunted by a Barghest, so the Goblins supported by Nfirea kill the dark beast, saving the child. Nfirea uses the experimental Purple Potion to fully heal Agu, the boy hobgoblin; Agu explains that he was attacked by minions of the Giant of the East, who himself has allied with the Demon Snake of the West. This shifts the balance of power in the forest, threatening the village.
29	3	"Enri's Upheaval and Hectic Days"; Transliteration: "Enri no Gekidō Katsu Awatadashī Hibi" (Japanese: エンリの激動かつ慌ただしい日々)	Shigeki Awai	Yukie Sugawara	July 25, 2018	
Enri, Nfirea, and the Goblin Troop bring Agu to Carne Village to inform them of the situation in the Great Forest: sometime ago, the Monument of Ruin was being built and guarded by Undead, and after the Great Beast of the South (Hamsuke) vanished, the Giant of the East allied himself with the Demon Snake of the West to defeat whoever this master of the Undead may be. Taking into account a possible threat, Brita goes to inform the Vigilante Committee to ready evacuation procedures, while Nfirea asks Lupusregina to deliver a Purple Potion to Ainz with a progress report. While Lupus nominates to ask Ainz for aid, Enri believes they should do their own efforts first. After the meeting, the Goblin Troop warn Agu not to trust Lupusregina, that she is more dangerous than she lets on. At night, the Goblin Troop find the rest of Agu's tribe and group of Ogres; one Goblin, Jugem, instructs Enri to act as Alpha to make them submissive, which works and they swear loyalty. As the survivors need medical treatment, Nfirea must stay up all night while Enri goes to E-Rantel in the morning. Arriving at the main gate, her Goblin General Horn is detected and is about to be put in custody, until Momon arrives to vouch for her and she is released. As Enri goes about her day, Momon covertly allows her to ask the Adventurer's Guild for aid with the trouble in the Forest. After a hectic day, Enri meets her Goblin Troop and offer new weapons out of thanks for all they have done for the village; with the Troop in a state of intense gratitude. Upon return, Enri is voted as new Village Chief, but is taken aback by this and consults Lupusregina and Nfirea. After a self-reflective talk with Nfirea, Enri decides to accept the position. Over the village high above, Lupusregina is met by Yuri Alpha for a summons by Ainz; when asked why she smiling, Lupusregina answers that the village dynamic has shifted and she would love to see the faces of the residents if the whole village were to burn down, hoping to see the village destroyed.
30	4	"Giant of the East, Demon Snake of the West"; Transliteration: "Higashi no Kyojin, Nishi no Maja" (Japanese: 東の巨人、西の魔蛇)	Akiko Nakano	Yukie Sugawara	August 1, 2018	
Ainz reprimands Lupusregina for her failure to report on Carne Village. Lupusregina states that she did not think it was important, but Ainz informs her of Nfirea's value and orders her to protect him, Enri, and Lizzie above all else. Afterward, Ainz and Aura goes to find the Giant of the East and Demon Snake of the West to see what sort of monsters they are. They discover the Giant is a large troll named Guu and the Demon Snake is a naga named Ryraryus. Ainz offers them to submit or die. Ryraryus quickly complies after failing to escape, however, Guu refuses and the two duel. Guu's attacks prove ineffective and Ainz neutralizes him and the remaining trolls and ogres. Afterwards, Ainz has Demiurge review the menu for a dinner Ainz is planning when Ainz is informed that the village is under attack and gives Lupusregina permission to engage.
31	5	"Two Leaders"; Transliteration: "Futari no Shidō-sha" (Japanese: 二人の指導者)	Masaki Matsumura	Yukie Sugawara	August 8, 2018	
Guu's forces begin their attack on Carne Village. While the goblin troop, allied ogres, and the vigilante committee prepare to defend the village, the remaining villagers take shelter. As the battle begins at the front gate, Enri and Nfirea search the village to ensure everyone is safe when they see a troll climbing over the rear gate. To prevent the troll from finding the hidden villagers, the two distract it by disguising their odor. However the troll catches on and Nfirea tells Enri to run for help and confesses his love to her. Nfirea continues to fight the troll while Enri gets backup, however, he is overwhelmed by the troll strength. Just before the troll is about the kill him, Lupusregina appears and kills the troll. The battle at the gate also ends successfully and Lupusregina informs Nfirea and Enri of Ainz's invitation to a dinner at Nazarick.
32	6	"Invitation to Death"; Transliteration: "Shide~e no Sasoi" (Japanese: 死出への誘い)	Kang Tai-sik	Yukie Sugawara	August 15, 2018	
Royal Mage, Fluder Paradyne is told that the adamantite adventurers from Darkness, wish to meet him. Meanwhile, the Worker group, Foresight, prepares to take on a mission exploring an undiscovered tomb within the borders of the Re-Estize Kingdom. The mission, appears to be well-paying albeit dangerous, but they have accepted it since one of their members, Mage Arche, needs money to take her little sisters and escape her heavily in-debt parents who refuse to cut back on their spending. They meet up with three other Worker Groups; Green Lead, Heavy Masher and Tenmu. They have all been hired by a noble of the Baharuth Kingdom, who has also hired Momon and Nabe as extra protection. Just before they all set off on the job, Momon inquires as to the reason why all of the Workers have agreed to this mission, to which they reason, "Money". Momon accepts the answer, deeming his question as unnecessary.
33	7	"Butterfly Entangled in a Spider's Web"; Transliteration: "Kumo ni Karame Rareru-chō" (Japanese: 蜘蛛に絡められる蝶)	Tatsuya Shiraishi	Yukie Sugawara	August 22, 2018	
The Workers arrive at Nazarick and briefly explore the outside and discover immense riches. They all decide to move deeper inside, except for Green Leaf, who decides to stay outside as a guard and look for other routes inside, while also secretly using the other groups as Canaries. Inside Nazarick, the groups are quickly separated in their eagerness to find more treasure. Outside, Green Leaf encounters the Pleiades, who summon a series of powerful Undead warriors called Nazarick Old Guarders, who make quick work of the worker group, slaughtering all of them. Heavy Masher is chased by a number of Elder Liches briefly, before the members are teleported to two places; Some are transported to the Black Capsule, where they are fed to cockroaches; the family of Area Guardian, Kyouhukou. One other member is teleported to the torture chamber and is tortured by Neuronist Painkill, presumably to death. Tenmu encounters Hamsuke, who is training to become a warrior. After a brief fight, the leader of Tenmu, Erya Uzruth is killed easily after Hamsuke activates the Martial Arts, Slashing Strike and beheads him. His elf slaves are left alone, after they start to kick his body, leaving Hamsuke uncertain as to what to do with them. Foresight is teleported to the 6th Floor Arena, where they are introduced as invaders and will be facing Ainz himself.
34	8	"A Handful of Hope"; Transliteration: "Hitonigiri no Kibō" (Japanese: 一握りの希望)	Kazuaki Terasawa	Yukie Sugawara	August 28, 2018	
Foresight tries to apologize to Ainz for trespassing into Nazarick, but Ainz rebuffs their words, refusing to listen to their excuses and declaring them to be worse than maggots for daring to enter Nazarick as thieves, without permission. The leader of Foresight, Hekkeran tries to bluff and say they received permission from a "large monster", but Ainz sees through the lie, which enrages him further. He initially attacks them with a sword and shield, but while he overwhelms them in strength, their own skill, experience and ability to work as a team, allow them to remain relatively unharmed. Ainz decides he has "played" enough and reveals himself as a magic caster; Arche initially denies his claim until Ainz shows off his true power, which he had concealed during the physical battle. The impact from this reveal shocks Arche to the point where she vomits in sheer terror and Foresight once more attempts to fight back, but fails miserably, with Hekkeran ending up paralyzed. Roberdyck and Imina, tell Arche to flee after Hekkeran falls, in order to go back to her sisters. Once she runs away, they beg Ainz to grant her mercy, and he accepts, but only by telling Shalltear to show Arche the depths of despair and then to kill her painlessly. He then beats Roberdyck and Imina easily. He keeps Roberdyck for mental experiments, while Imina and Hekkeran are given to Gashokukochuuou; a parasitic NPC. Arche attempt to run away from Shalltear, and fails when she discovers that she is actually underground and there is no way out, after which Shalltear reveals her true form and kills her. Mara and Aura later travel to the Baharuth Empire, where they confront Emperor Jircniv for sending the Workers into the tomb and demand that he atone for this crime.
35	9	"War of Words"; Transliteration: "Zessen" (Japanese: 舌戦)	Akiko Nakano	Yukie Sugawara	September 4, 2018	
Emperor Jircniv travels to Nazarick to apologize for the invasion of Nazarick, and is immediately given a show of Nazarick's power when they use Tier 6 magic easily, and use Death Knights, monsters capable of slaughtering armies for menial tasks like setting tables. Ainz further shows off his power, when he is given the head of the noble who was responsible for sending Workers to Nazarick (albeit, secretly on Jircniv's orders) and turns it into a Death Knight. Ainz reveals his intention to crush anyone who would dare go against him, and restore peace to his surroundings, and Jircniv extends an offer of friendship to protect the Baharuth Empire, while suggesting that Nazarick establish a proper kingdom, but secretly intends to set up an alliance behind his back in order to defeat him. However Demiurge has already figured out the Emperor's plan, and reveals it to Ainz and the other NPCs later. Jircniv realizes that Fluder Paradyne has actual been working with Ainz the entire time, and has betrayed him; This is confirmed in a flashback, where Ainz has revealed his true power to Fluder, who in turn pledges his undying loyalty to Ainz, in exchange for giving Fluder the opportunity to "peer into the abyss of magic".
36	10	"Preparation for War"; Transliteration: "Sensō Junbi" (Japanese: 戦争準備)	Masaki Matsumura	Yukie Sugawara	September 11, 2018	
Ainz establishes the Sorcerous Kingdom of Nazarick, and demands that the Re-Estize Kingdom withdraw from all lands around E-Rantel, claiming they belong to the Sorcerous Kingdom, and the Baharuth Empire backs them. Gazef requests the king to do as Ainz asks, claiming fighting Ainz would be a terrible idea, but the King refuses as doing so would be a sign of weakness and he cannot afford to show weakness when the Royal Faction in Re-Estize has begun to grow in strength after the Jaldabaoth Incident. Marquis Raeven agrees with this path, and is set up as commander for the war. Crown Prince Barbro is eager to prove himself and tries to join in, but instead is sent to Carne Village to question the villagers about Ainz. Barbro decides to draft the villagers once he has questioned them in order to use them as hostages against Ainz. Ainz arrives at the Baharuth Army camp before summoning his army of Death Knights.
37	11	"Another Battle"; Transliteration: "Mōhitotsu no Tatakai" (Japanese: もう一つの戦い)	Ryūta Kawahara	Yukie Sugawara	September 18, 2018	
Barbro's army arrives at Carne village, and Enri, the new chief, struggles to delay them as they hid the goblins and ogres. Barbro has a watch tower burnt down as a threat, but the action only reminds the villagers of the incident Ainz saved them from, inspiring the villagers to take up arms against Barbro for Ainz. Lupusregina watches the incident unfold and is broadcasting it to Ainz. Enri and Nfirea decide to lead the women and children out from the back, while the able-bodied men, goblins and ogres act as a distractions from the front. The strategy seems to work, but the soldiers present at the back notice the fleeing villagers, and in an attempt to delay them Enri blows on the second goblin horn Ainz gave her, but somehow summons not a small group of mercenary-like goblins but an army of goblins 5000-strong. Ainz is surprised, but theorizes that the horn in fact hides a true power that no one has unlocked, and that Enri somehow managed to unlock these conditions. The Goblin Army proves to be more than a match for Barbro's conscripts and send them running, saving the village. Later, Barbro's army is surrounded by Level 41 Redcaps, and Lupusregina who reveals her intentions of massacring Barbro's remaining army and himself. Barbro attempts to bargain, pointing out that he is the crown prince, but Lupusregina is unconcerned pointing out that he is not necessary for Ainz' plans.
38	12	"Massacre"; Transliteration: "Dai Gyakusatsu" (Japanese: 大虐殺)	Hideki Hosokawa	Yukie Sugawara	September 25, 2018	
Jircniv reveals to his advisors that he plans on having Ainz cast the first stone in the upcoming war, in order to truly gauge his strength and to reveal the threat he poses to the world, hoping to use that and have the Re-Estize kingdom realize the necessity of an alliance. The Baharuth Empire's 60,000-strong army consists of well-trained knights, while the Kingdom's army is 240,000 strong, but consists mainly of average people; Conscripts over trained soldiers. Gazef and Raeven are at the front-lines, and Gazef has been given the four treasures of the kingdom; adamantite armour, a magic sword called Razor Edge that can cut through anything, Gauntlets of Endurance that provide endless stamina and The Amulet of Immortality that provides regeneration. Ainz approaches the front lines with his army of Death Knights, but proceeds to begin casting a Super-Tier spell. On realizing the danger Ainz poses, Raeven and Gazef attempt to issue order to retreat, but fail to do so in time. The left flank of the Kingdom's army, consisting of 70,000 men, charges as Ainz casts the spell, Iä Shub-Niggurath, which slaughters the entire left flank and proceeds to sacrifice them to summon 5 massive monsters called 'The Dark Young', who he directs towards the Kingdom's army to literally crush underfoot. Gazef attempts to fight back, but the Dark Young prove to be unstoppable, until Ainz walks onto the battle-field and approaches Gazef and asks him to become his subordinate in exchange for calling off the Dark Young. Gazef refuses even as Ainz tries to goad him, and just as Ainz is about to continue the massacre, Gazef challenges Ainz to duel.
39	13	"PVP"	Tatsuya Shiraishi; Kazuaki Terasawa	Yukie Sugawara	October 2, 2018	
Gazef challenges Ainz, despite knowing that he has no chance of winning, and Ainz accepts the duel. Before fighting, Ainz examines Gazef's sword to reveal that he has unknown properties and despite being imbued with lesser amounts of Mana, it is able to harm and possibly kill Ainz. The duel begins, Climb is asked to be the starter of the duel and asks if he can use a magical bell. Ainz agrees. As soon as Climb rings the bell, Ainz casts time-stop magic. He uses an instant death spell to kill Gazef during the stopped time. He calls off the Dark Young, out of respect for Gazef, but warns Brain that if the Kingdom refuses to surrender, then they will rampage through the Capital. Jircniv is informed about Ainz's power, much to his horror. The King and Nobles of the Kingdom are terrified at the result, and have no choice but to give up E-Rantel, as per Ainz's demands. Brain and Climb believe that Gazef's useless attempt to fight Ainz was a way to help them learn more about him, to set up their defences and Brain vows to become better than Gazef. Ainz arrives at E-Rantel in a large procession, but all the people hide inside out of fear. A child attempts to throw a rock at Ainz, but the sign of disrespect has Albedo attempt to execute him, until he is saved by Momon. Momon, played by Pandora's Actor, is enlisted by Ainz to act as a City representative and law enforcer. This is revealed to be part of Demiurge's plan in order to find and kill any enemies as the humans will rally under Momon, while Momon serves Ainz. The Guardians once more pledge their fidelity to Ainz as the Sorcerer King, and he declares it to be the founding of the Sorcerous Kingdom.

== Home media release ==
=== Japanese ===
Media Factory (Region 2, Japan)
Vol.	Discs	Episodes	Release date	Ref.
1	2	1–5	October 24, 2018	
2	2	6–9	November 28, 2018	
3	2	10–13	December 21, 2018	

=== English ===
Funimation (Region 1, USA)
Vol.	Discs	Episodes	Release date	Ref.
Season 3	4	1–13	June 25, 2019	
