= Overlord season 2 =

2018 Japanese television season

Overlord II
- Season 2
- Key visual
- No. of episodes: 13

Release
- Original network: AT-X
- Original release: January 10 – April 4, 2018

Season chronology
- ← Previous; Overlord Next → Overlord III

Overlord is an anime series based on the light novel series of the same name written by Kugane Maruyama and illustrated by so-bin. The second season was announced at film screenings of the second compilation film. It aired from January 10 to April 4, 2018. The season also saw a change in broadcast network with Sun TV and KBS Kyoto dropping the series while MBS added the series to its schedule.

Funimation has licensed the second season for a simuldub.

The opening theme is "Go Cry Go" by OxT while the ending theme is "Hydra" by Myth & Roid.

== Episodes ==
No. overall	No. in season	Title	Directed by	Written by	Original release date (Note: Tokyo MX listed the broadcast times as Tuesday nights at 24:30, meaning the first broadcast technically occurred on Wednesday at 12:30 am JST. Dates in this article reflect the actual calendar date of the broadcast.)	Ref.
14	1	"The Dawn of Despair"; Transliteration: "Zetsubō no Makuake" (Japanese: 絶望の幕開け)	Tatsuya Shiraishi	Yukie Sugawara	January 10, 2018	
In the Slane Theocracy, the Captain of the Black Scripture and Zesshi Zetsumei discuss the mystery of Ainz Ooal Gown for his growing celebrity as a magic caster, and a recent vampire attack which killed two Scripture members and severely wounded Lady Kaire. Zesshi expresses intrigue in Ainz, as she seeks a man capable of defeating her so as to sire for her a more powerful child. Meanwhile in another location, former adventurer Rigrit of the original 13 Heroes and the Platinum Dragon Lord discuss the possibility that a dark and powerful player from YGGDRASIL may have arrived to this New World. In the Re-Estize Capital, Gazef Stronoff is with the King as the nobles of the Kingdom decide to bring the annual war to Baharuth, and the King apologizes for not having sent full support for the events of Carne Village. After a brief visit by Princess Renner and her squire Climb, the King asks Gazef to request a meeting with Ainz Ooal Gown to show his gratitude for saving Gazef. After Ainz finishes a job as Momon, he returns to Nazarick to give a debriefing to Albedo (simply ecstatic at his return) of what he has learned in relation to the notable nation states in the known world in proximity of Nazarick's position on the map. Aura, overseeing the construction of the decoy replica of Nazarick, receives a gift from Ainz in the form of a talking wristwatch with the voice of her creator Lady BukubukuChagama dictating Lunch Hour. Meanwhile, Shalltear (guilt-ridden over trying to kill Ainz while under mind control) drinks herself into a stupor while Eclair, Sebas' assistant Butler, fails at trying to cheer her up. Cocytus is sent to start a war with the Lizardmen and claim the fallen for a later army of undead. In the village of the Lizardmen, Green Claw Tribe Chieftain Shasryu discuss daily life with his younger brother Zaryusu when a monstrous entity comes from the clouds.
15	2	"Departure"; Transliteration: "Tabidachi" (Japanese: 旅立ち)	Naoyuki Itō; Kazu Terasawa	Yukie Sugawara	January 17, 2018	
The dark entity which descends from the sky is a herald forewarning the Lizardmen of the Green Claw Tribe of an invasion in eight days time. Zaryusu advises an alliance with the other Lizardmen tribes- Small Fang, Razor tail, Dragon Tusk, and Red Eye. But as Dragon Tusk has survivors of defeated Tribes Yellow Speckle and Sharp Edge, there is little to no hope of alliance with them. Zaryusu is permitted by his brother the Chieftain to be the envoy to seek an alliance with the other tribes. Reaching the Red Eye tribe, Zaryusu meets Crusch Lulu the Interim Chief/Priestess of the village. Enamored by her, he instinctively lets out a mating cry desiring to marry her. After an awkward start, the two discuss an alliance and reach a consensus. Planning to build an alliance, Zaryusu and Crusch arrive in the Dragon Tusk village and meet the Chieftain Zenburu Gugu, who also received the herald's message, but will only join the alliance if Zaryusu can prove his worth in combat. Back in Nazarick, Demiurge talks with Eclair, and it is revealed both are aware of Eclair's hidden agenda to usurp Nazarick's Throne as that was his design by Ankoro Mochi Mochi. As a decoy replica of Nazarick is under construction, Cocytus is informed by his subordinates of Demiurge's scroll mission and the need to report regularly. Cocytus takes this news, and readies his army for the coming war in a few days.
16	3	"Lizard Men, Gathering"; Transliteration: "Tsudou, Rizādoman" (Japanese: 集う、蜥蜴人)	Hiro Soetakazu	Fūta Takei; Yukie Sugawara	January 24, 2018	
Zenburu fights Zaryusu, and they wager the role of Chief and Crusch for a mate. Zaryusu realizes his physical strength is less than Zanburu, but uses his Frost Pain, a magic item, to freeze Zenburu with each attack, causing Zenburu to yield realizing he can not keep fighting an item which will kill him as he fights. The group parties to discuss the alliance, and Dragon Tusk joins in. Heading to the Razor Tail Tribe, the first attack site of the herald's message, Shasryu greets the trio and everyone gathers for a scout reports the odds are against them with forces 3:1. Cocytus views on a crystal monitor their gathering and orders the attack. The Lizardmen put up a moderate resistance, until the five Chiefs use their Magic Caster abilities to quickly summon Swamp Elementals. Entoma informs Lord Ainz, who views the situation with the Battle as unexpected. Cocytus messages Demiurge for insight, the latter informing him to think for himself as to how to ration and deploy troops against the Lizardmen, as it may be the undisclosed wish of Lord Ainz. Cocytus orders an Elder Lich Caster Commander into the fight, tearing down resistance with relative ease. Seeing their chance to enter the fight, Zaryusu sacrifices his steed, the Hydra Snake Rororo, to get in close to the Lich to fight alongside Crusch and Zenburu, who are later rendered incapacitated, leaving Zaryusu to muster what strength he has left to trap himself and the Lich Commander in a massive ice cage. After much pain and many attacks, Zaryusu is victorious by surprise attacking the Lich in a fog and driving his Frost Pain into the former's brain. With the Lizardmen victorious in the battle, Cocytus must answer to Ainz.
17	4	"Army of Death"; Transliteration: "Shi no Gunzei" (Japanese: 死の軍勢)	Tatsuya Shiraishi	Yukie Sugawara	January 31, 2018	
The Lizardmen celebrate victory; Zaryus and Crusch are alone in a tent blushing, when Zenburu barges in wondering if their "having fun"- much to their shock. Back in Nazarick, Ainz introduces 8th Floor Guardian 'Victim' to the others, to prepare for unforeseen encounters; Demiurge was successful in making higher quality scrolls using Sheep Beastmen; Ainz promises to fulfill Shalltear's need for punishment later on. Lastly, as Cocytus was defeated, Ainz explains he gave Cocytus a weak army so he would learn to adapt and reapply resources as a leader. As all of Cocytus' forces were low tier undead, there was no risk for Nazarick. But Cocytus must face punishment: he is to eradicate the Lizardmen. Cocytus instead asks the Lizardmen be spared into servitude of Nazarick. When Ainz asks why, Demiurge steps in proposing it could benefit them to see how governing a new people under Nazarick would work, as they may have to again in the future and starting now would help prepare them. Ainz agrees, but demands Cocytus rule them by means without fear. Ainz only wanted to hear Cocytus' free opinion, demanding his Guardians think over their orders so as to bring greater benefit to Nazarick. After departing, Demiurge states to the Guardians that Ainz intended for all this, wishing they learn to be more interdependent in their goal for conquest, and Cocytus' mission was also a probe of the Lizardmen. In his bedroom, Momonga is happy his guardians are learning to evolve, and also notices a familiar floral scent (Albedo's). The next day, the Guardians and Ainz himself return to the battlefield in a grand show of force: freezing the lake, Gargantua (twice the height of the forest) throws a massive stone in the center of the lake, and the undead perform a royal procession for Ainz to sit atop the stone and speak before the Lizardmen. When the Shasha brothers act as representatives, Demiurge uses controller magic to have them bow properly before Ainz' decree: Cocytus will arrive in 4 hours time to fight them on his own, and if they win they're forever free of Nazarick. The Five Tribe leaders discuss sending only themselves, with Crusch to stay behind and lead. As she argues against this, the Tribe Leaders leave Zaryusu to talk with her- they both accept that there will be death and Crusch demands Zaryusu impregnate her to preserve their love.
18	5	"The Freezing God"; Transliteration: "Hyōketsu no Bushin" (Japanese: 氷結の武神)	Kazuaki Terasawa	Yukie Sugawara	February 7, 2018	
The Lizardmen champions- The Shasha Brothers, Zenburu, with Kyuku Zuzu and Sukyu Juju (Razor Tail and Small Fang Chieftains respectively) prepare for battle with Cocytus. During this preparation, Ainz and his guardians enter a temporary base of operations while Victim Guards the First Floor as they are out. Upon seeing a make shift throne for himself by his guardians, he opts to use Shalltear as a chair as her due punishment (when really he felt uneasy about sitting in a chair made of bones); this enrages Albedo but hyper stimulates Shalltear's pleasure. While observing the Lizardmen, the Mirror of Remote Viewing stumbles on Zaryusu and Crusch having sex- which starts a conversation Ainz forces to be quiet. The Lizardmen champions stand ready, and Cocytus arrives to do battle equipped in his Floor Guardian gear. Many Lizardmen die leaving only the Shasha brothers. Cocytus asks for their names and grants them the honor of death by his God Slaying Emperor Blade. Repeating the fog and surprise attack maneuver, they are easily countered and Shasryu is killed. Later, Ainz congratulates Cocytus for his victory and summons Crusch over for a deal: report and monitor her people for any signs of rebellion and Ainz will revive Zaryusu. Crusch agrees and Ainz resurrects Zaryusu (suffering confusion and level loss from the YGGDRASIL resurrection function) among the villagers- who now worship him a god. After pledging their fidelity, Zaryusu asks for his brother and Zenburu be returned as well, and Ainz takes it into consideration having the Lizardmen keep their bodies safeguarded. Tired, Zaryusu and Crusch go to get rest.
19	6	"Those Who Pick Up, Those Who Are Picked Up"; Transliteration: "Hirou mono, Hirowa reru mono" (Japanese: 拾う者、拾われる者)	Akiko Nakano	Itsuki Yokoyama	February 14, 2018	
While still in the Re-Estize capital, Sebas goes to the Magician's Guild to purchase a spell scroll, and on his way back to the mansion stumbles upon a brutalized young woman. After remembering the words of his creator Player Touch Me, he decides to take her to safety. The man who threw her away begs Sebas not to as he will be killed by the Eight Fingers crime syndicate for allowing an asset to be taken; Sebas gives the man money to flee town as a response. Upon his return, Solution is taken aback by Sebas' care for the young girl and having Solution heal her of injury. Waking up she is fed, and breaks down crying for being shown the level of kindness Sebas has given, and revealing her name is Tuare. Sebas orders Solution not inform Lord Ainz, stating it is not worth his time knowing about a meager human girl. Meanwhile, Gazef has breakfast with Brain Unglaus, who is in a depressive state following his encounter with Shalltear, and Gazef tries to help him. Out in a secluded region, Adamantite Adventurer Team Blue Rose destroys an illegal crop used in the production of a powerful narcotic called Black Dust. While scouting, Blue Rose member Evileye finds a parchment with code which can lead them to the leaders of Eight Fingers. At the same time, the heads of Eight Fingers discuss the crop burning and the girl's rescue by Sebas. At the table, Zero, head of Eight Fingers Security, promises Coco Doll, head of the Slave Department, that his men will return the girl to their possession.
20	7	"Blue Roses"; Transliteration: "Aoi no Bara" (Japanese: 蒼の薔薇)	Kim Min Sun	Yukie Sugawara	February 21, 2018	
As Ainz reviews the New World finances, he finds it difficult to manage funds for the Lizardmen budget and the undercover Nazarick agents. Narberal, as Nabe, comes to Ainz in regards to the various ore samples he had bought to do an appraisal experiment on the Exchange Box, to see which ore from where yields the most gold. He gives Nabe all the money he has left, reminding her to be covert and pleasant to humans for their covers, and silently frets on financial woes. Elsewhere, Climb is given a sparring session by Gazef, who informs Climb of Ainz Ooal Gown, having saved his life, for the young bodyguard to remember. After the spar, Gazef notes to his Vice-Chief that Climb's power can not go pass that of a Gold ranked Adventurer and his efforts will not change that, but he can still learn from experience. Across the way, Gazef sees Prince Zanac talking with Marquis Raeven, likely forming an alliance despite Kingdom factions as Raeven is an opportunist. Meeting with Princess Renner, Climb is introduced to Blue Roses Leader Lakyus Alvein Dale Aindra along with one of Blue Roses' Twin Assassins, Tina. Under Renner's guidance, they learn the code they discovered at the Black Dust crop is really a list of locations of importance to Eight Fingers in the capital city. One location not listed, is an underground brothel in the capital, and Blue Roses brings Climb to investigate alongside them; however, remembering a Nobleman's daughter serves as one of Renner's maids, they worry of their plans having been uncovered. Meanwhile, Sebas has Tuare serve as the maid of the manor he and Solution are using as cover to better sell that identity, but are later found by Succulent (an Eight Fingers agent) and Constable Staffan Havish. The two 'ask' for compensation for Sebas' purchasing Tuare despite the Anti-Slave laws, so as to be pardoned for his 'crime'. Permitting Sebas two days to think over their proposal, the two take their leave. As Sebas goes on a "walk" to clear his mind, Solution messages Ainz to inform him Sebas may have been compromised.
21	8	"A Boy's Feeling"; Transliteration: "Shōnen no Omoi" (Japanese: 少年の思い)	Shinsuke Gomi	Satoko Sekine	February 28, 2018	
Climb heads to an inn where Gagaran and Evileye are having lunch and informs them that Lakyus wants them to be ready to mobilize. As the conversation goes on, Evileye informs the both of them of the new Adamantite team "Darkness", which is made up of the adventurers Momon and Nabe with The Wise King of the Forest as a pet - leaving Gagaran astounded by their reported feats. Climb wishes to be capable of such strength, but the duo advise him to go his own pace, and not to lose his humanity in pursuit of power. Meanwhile, Brain Unglaus runs errands for Gazef, and goes past a crowd watching a group of drunk men assaulting a boy for simply bumping into them; Climb also goes by the crowd and moves to stop the matter. Both see Sebas move with skill and speed to resolve the matter in one punch. They separately follow the butler into an alleyway, where Climb enthusiastically asks Sebas for a quick lesson in strength after witnessing him recently. Sebas sees Climb as trustworthy and gives him a lesson: how to overcome fear of death. By flooding Climb's sense with killing intent, Climb dodges at the last possible instance by overcoming his fear by thinking of Renner. Brain, having witnessed this around the corner, is moved by Climb's ability to overcome intense fear and asks to also learn from Sebas. However, the trio are beset by five assassin's sent by Succulent- of which Sebas downs three, for the last two to be handled by Brain and Climb. With their attackers downed, Sebas uses a skill to easily interrogate one of them on where to find Succulent and the Eight Fingers. The trio move together out of a grown respect for each other, and move to destroy Eight Fingers in the Capital of Re-Estize. They head for Succulent's brothel – the same place Sebas rescued Tuare from.
22	9	"Soaring Sparks of Fire"; Transliteration: "Mai Agaru Hi no ko" (Japanese: 舞い上がる火の粉)	Motohiro Abe	Fūta Takei; Yukie Sugawara	March 7, 2018	
Sebas, Brain and Climb arrive at the brothel and use two entryways: the front door to the main brothel, and the side entrance to the underground storage area. Climb and Brain take the latter door, while Sebas charges the front. Sebas forewarns the duo that if needed, he will kill opposition inside if he is forced to, with the both of them understanding; they only ask that the Eight Fingers leaders Coco Doll and Succulent be captured. Sebas easily removes the steel door and knocks away the guards, and comes across Constable Staffan Havish mercilessly assaulting a slave girl for pleasure. Sebas slaps Staffan into a bloody state, and after the Constables pleas for mercy with money, Sebas concludes he is unworthy of life and kicks him in half. Brain and Climb stop their opposition and locate a trap door (courtesy of items by Gagaran) leading to the underground storage. While Brain scouts further in having Climb stand watch, Coco Doll and Succulent arrive by a hidden passage in front of the young warrior. Succulent uses his illusion magic to gravely injure Climb, until Brain returns and defeats him with his God Slash Technique. The trio are successful in apprehending two of the Eight Fingers, and return to their respective homes: Brain returns to Gazef's home and the two have dinner discussing Climb's progress and Shalltear by name; Sebas returns to the manor, only for Solution to be in her Pleiades attire, telling him Ainz is in the next room waiting to speak with him; Climb returns to Renner, who is pleased he is safe. After Climb retires for the night, Renner calls in the maid she knows is spying on her to tell her about how amazing Climb was- only for her to actually plan on killing the maid for disrespecting Climb within her earshot, revealing her obsessive love for him. Late at night, Zero gathers the remaining members of Six Arms to kill Sebas, Climb, and Brain for opposing them.
23	10	"Disturbance Begins in the Royal Capital"; Transliteration: "Ōto Dōran Joshō" (Japanese: 王都動乱序章)	Tatsuya Shiraishi	Itsuki Yokoyama	March 14, 2018	
Ainz (actually Pandora's Actor in disguise) investigates Sebas' possible betrayal, with Demiurge, Victim, and Cocytus as witnesses. He orders Sebas to kill Tuare to confirm his loyalty. Sebas does so and, having his attacked blocked by Cocytus, is proven to be a steadfast servant to Nazarick. After the real Ainz arrives, the Overlord hears Tuare's full name and realizes she is the sister of Ninya (the spell caster from the Swords of Darkness), thus he allows Sebas' request of having her as a provisional maid. In the Royal Palace, Renner and Blue Rose meet to discuss the raids on Eight Fingers, but Marquis Raeven and Prince Zanac arrive with a solution to the lack of manpower. After a mild topic of Renner's true persona and her feelings for Climb, she reveals she has damning intelligence on the Royal and Noble Factions, and coerces Raeven to lend his private army to the simultaneous raids of Eight Fingers. He reluctantly agrees, and Zanac reveals their eldest brother Barbro has a hidden storehouse in trade with Eight Fingers, which is now added to the map. Renner also reveals her ace against the syndicate, aside from Blue Rose's aid, is Gazef Stronoff. After a long day of acquiring materials for Demiurge to feed his livestock of Arbelion Sheep (humans), Sebas and Solution return to the manor to find Tuare missing and a note from Six Arms challenging Sebas for her freedom. Solution reminds Sebas of Ainz's words, and they message their master of the situation. Ainz, preoccupied as Momon elsewhere, relays to Albedo to send reinforcements. While initially hesitant to aid a human, she relents and sends the forces for Demiurge to command onsite to destroy Eight Fingers. Albedo, to herself, then thinks of the name Ainz Ooal Gown after the Guild name to be ridiculous, preferring Momonga - as evident by his original player banner draped on the wall, and the guild flag on the floor.
24	11	"Jaldabaoth"; Transliteration: "Yarudabaoto" (Japanese: ヤルダバオト)	Kazuaki Terasawa	Satoko Sekine	March 21, 2018	
After Sebas departs to rescue Tuare from Six Arms, Demiurge lays out the plan for his "Operation: Gehenna" to the Pleiades, Mare, and Shalltear. Meanwhile in the Royal Encampment, Climb and Brain team up with former adventurer Lockmyer to raid one of the known Eight Fingers bases. There they encounter Sebas, who was summoned to the same base as the trio to fight the Six Arms. When Sebas encounters four members of Six Arms, he takes a few seconds to kill them and the surrounding customers. Solution reports that Zero is not amongst the patrons. Elsewhere at Hilma's residence, she wakes up to find her home encased in shrubbery. Encountering Mare, he breaks her leg to drag her away, leaving Entoma to empty the manor. While Entoma is snacking on a human body part, Gagaran has a chance encounter with her and fights the bug maid thinking she is with Eight Fingers. Blue Rose members Tia and Evileye arrive, and together they overpower and defeat Entoma. Before the finishing blow, the bug maid is rescued by Jaldabaoth and taken to safety. After Gagaran and Tia are killed by the demon's Hellfire Wall, an enraged Evileye charges at the demon but is halted by the arrival of Momon.
25	12	"The Final Battle of the Disturbance"; Transliteration: "Dōran Saishū Kessen" (Japanese: 動乱最終決戦)	Ryūta Kawahara	Yukie Sugawara	March 28, 2018	
Evileye requests Momon's help to defeat Jaldabaoth, to which he obliges. Momon (Ainz) proves himself to be Jaldabaoth's (Demiurge's) equal while defending Evileye at the same time, which results in Evileye developing romantic feelings for Momon. Jaldabaoth eventually leaves the fight, claiming to search for an item within the city, and that he will guard the region the item is in. While Evileye wants to follow him, Momon decides not to, citing the reason as Jaldabaoth's restrained fighting. She accidentally angers Momon and Nabe, when she mentions how Gagaran, Tia and herself nearly killed Entoma. Meanwhile, Brain, Climb and Lockmyer are escorting Tuare out when the encounter Zero, who challenges Brain to a fight. Together, Lockmyer and Climb manage to beat Succulent disguised as Tuare, while Brain and Zero prove to be evenly matched. Sebas, after rescuing the real Tuare, wanders in and discovers the fight. To the disbelief of Zero, Sebas states that the Six Arms were all killed. He abandons his fight with Brain and unleashes his strongest attack on Sebas, who takes it without flinching and kills Zero with a single drop kick. Sebas leaves with Tuare, but promises to return the debt he owes to Climb and Brain for their assistance in her rescue. A circle of fire created by Jaldabaoth emerges within the city, and is seen by everyone. Princess Renner arranges for the adventurers and the soldiers to enter the ring and kill the demons present inside, while Climb, Brain and Lockmyer attempt to save the citizens. Momon, Nabe and Evileye are to move into the center to fight Jaldabaoth. It is revealed that she intends to use the adventurers and soldiers as cannon fodder, while Momon's group moves in to kill Jaldabaoth.
26	13	"The Ultimate Trump Card"; Transliteration: "Saikyō Saikō no Kirifuda" (Japanese: 最強最高の切り札)	Masaki Matsumura; Tōru Takahashi; Naoyuki Itō	Yukie Sugawara	April 4, 2018	
The Adventurer Coalition moves in to rescue the captured civilians in the residential sector, while the royal guards hold back a wave of demons until Momon, Nabe and Evileye arrive. Brain notices a disguised Shalltear and challenges her in order to give his comrades time to escape. Brain manages to cut Shalltear's fingernail with Four Fold Slash of Light, and happily retreats while she is distracted. As he runs, Shalltear notices Climb and Lockmyer, leaving them behind after remembering the order Demiurge gave her. The three find a warehouse of civilians and are faced with the people pleading for their taken loved ones; confirming the Princess' theory of family separation. As Momon, Nabe, and Evileye encounter Jaldabaoth, they see his five Masked Demon Maids. While the female adventurers handle the maids, Momon battles Jaldabaoth. Lakyus fights off wave after wave of demon hordes while support mages heal wounded adventurers, until Gazef arrives with the King's personal army. Elsewhere, Demiurge and Ainz speak in private in an abandoned building to discuss Demiurge's full plan. Lastly, all blame is to be laid on Jaldabaoth in order to boost Momon's fame. As Evileye fights, a hidden Narberal calmly chats with three of her sisters. As Mare gives the Earthquake signal, the maids return to their intended roles. Evileye regroups with Nabe, and Jaldabaoth is thrust into the scene by Momon. Jaldabaoth calls for a retreat, and the disturbance comes to an end. The adventurers and soldiers gather and hail Momon a hero of the Kingdom. Elsewhere, Aura captures the remaining Eight Fingers leaders and makes them servants to Ainz Ooal Gown. After some resistance, Hilma urges the Dark Elf Twins to let her make them loyal out of fear of returning to Kyouhukou for torture. Aura allows it, affirming they now control half of the country. In the Baharuth Empire, Fluder Paradyne informs Emperor Jircniv Rune Farlord El Nix that, while investigating Ainz Ooal Gown, he concludes the magic caster is greater than or equal to his level of magical power. While wishing to meet Ainz personally, Jircniv orders Fluder to investigate Adamantite Adventurer Momon as well.

== Home media release ==
=== Japanese ===
Media Factory (Region 2, Japan)
Vol.	Discs	Episodes	Release date	Ref.
1	2	1–5	April 25, 2018	
2	2	6–9	May 25, 2018	
3	2	10–13	June 27, 2018	

=== English ===
Funimation (Region 1, USA)
Vol.	Discs	Episodes	Release date	Ref.
Season 2	4	1–13	January 15, 2019	
