= Furo =

Traditional Japanese bath

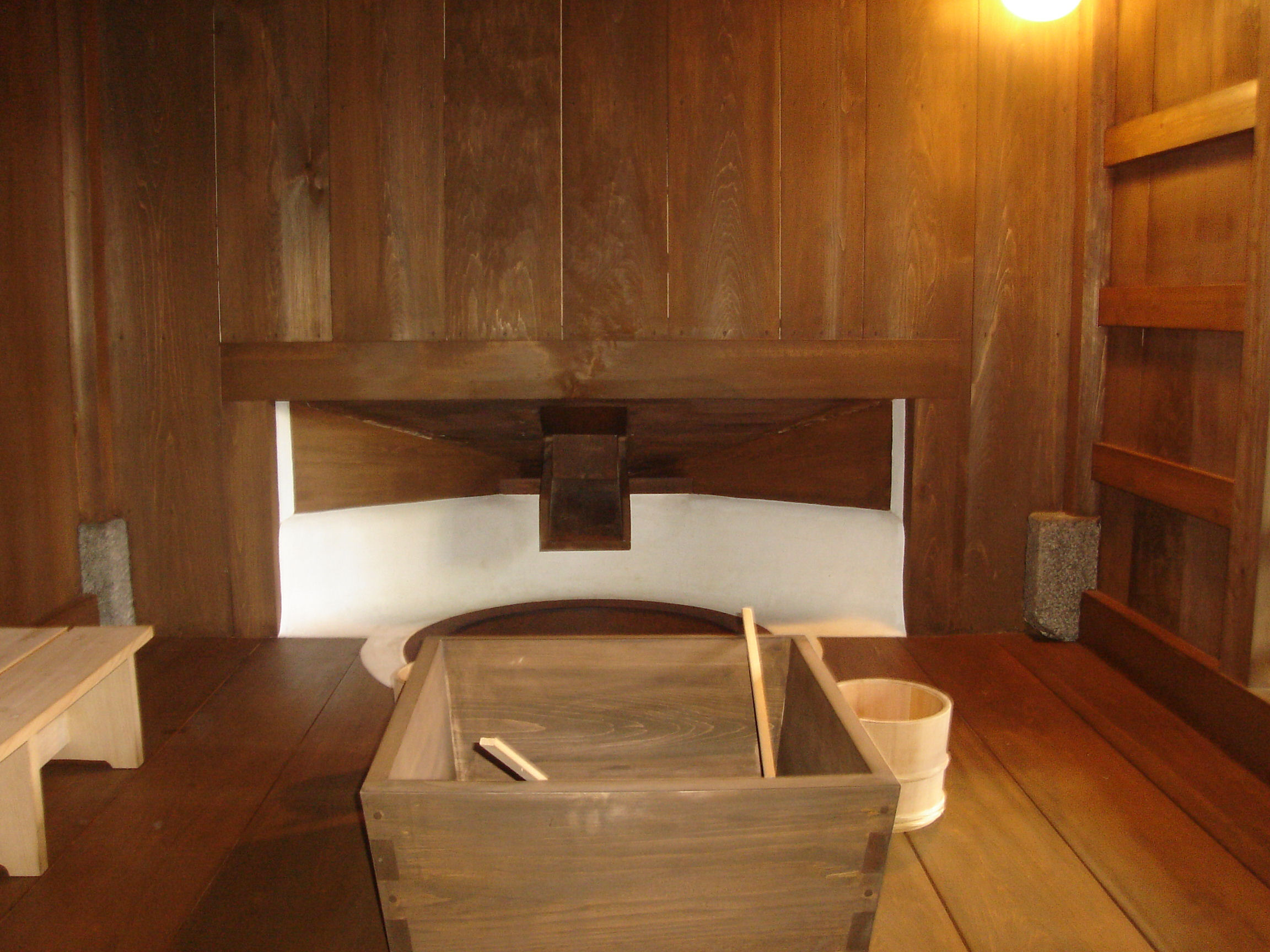
Senmyō (宣明), furo of Shōkoku-ji (built 1400, reconstruction 1596) in Kyoto, Japan

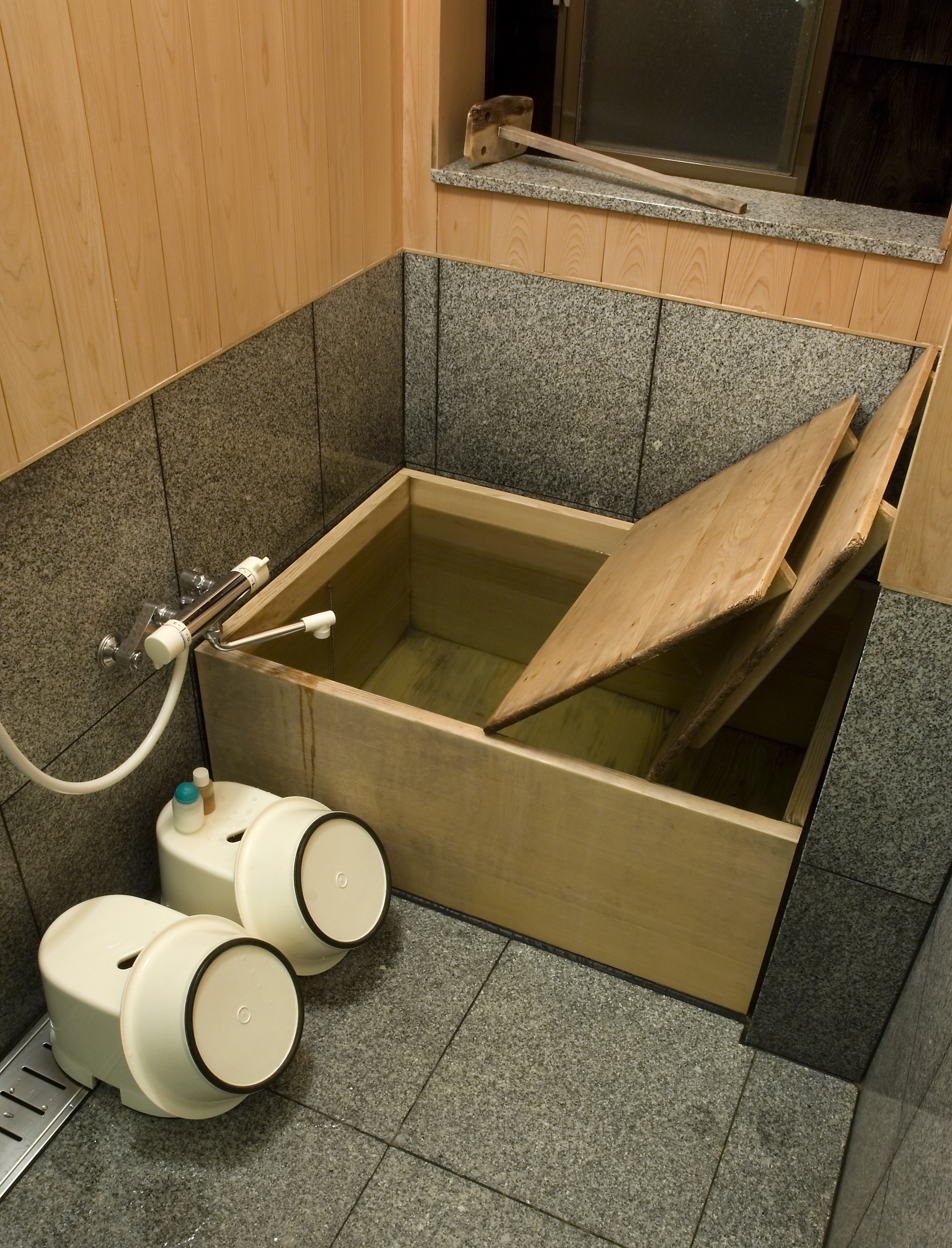
A traditional private furo in a ryokan in Kyoto

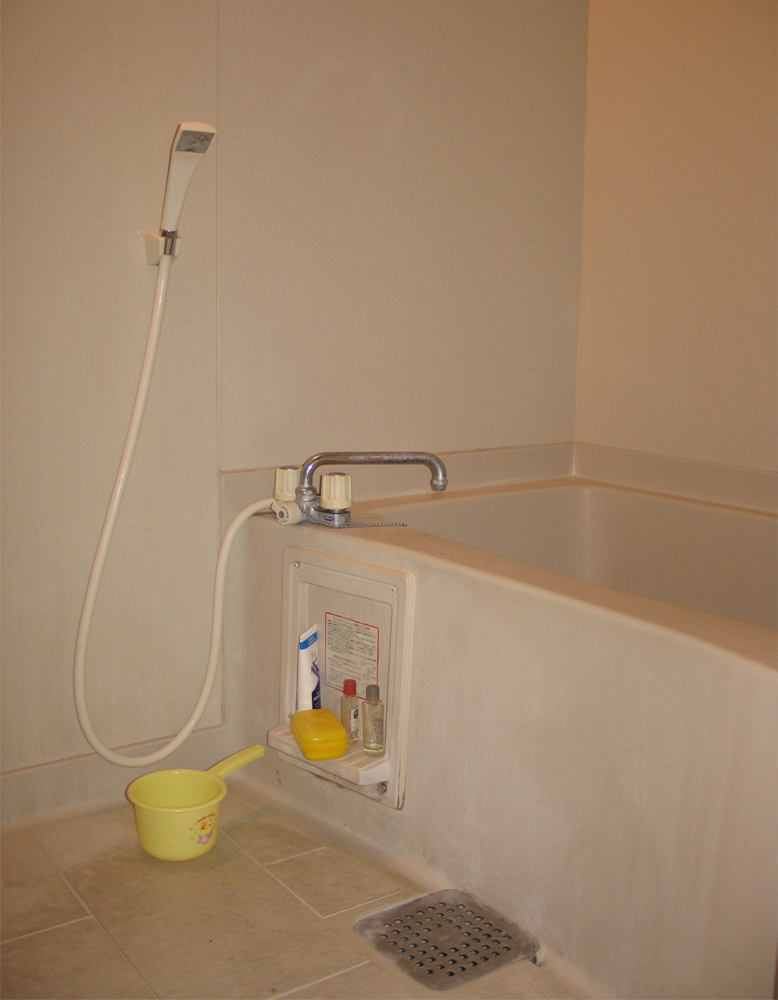
A modern acrylic furo in a Japanese apartment

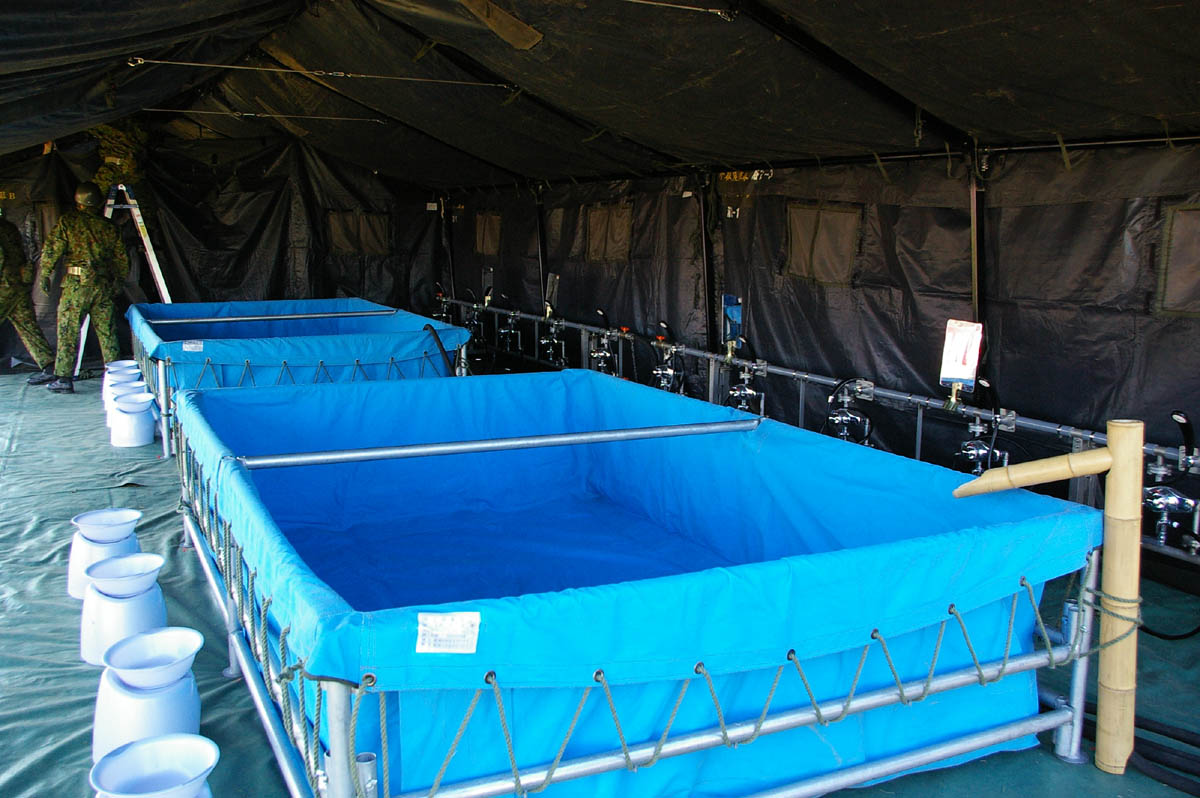
A JGSDF military furo in Camp Matsudo

Furo (風呂), or the more common and polite form ofuro (お風呂), is a Japanese bath and/or bathroom. Specifically it is a type of bath which originated as a short, steep-sided wooden bathtub. Baths of this type are found all over Japan in houses, apartments and traditional Japanese inns (ryokan) but are now usually made out of a plastic or stainless steel.

A furo differs from a conventional Western bathtub by being of a deeper construction, typically in the region of 60 cm (24 inches). The sides are generally square rather than being sloped. They typically have no overflow drainage. Traditional pot-shaped cast iron furo were heated by a wood-burning stove built-in below them.

Furo (or yubune (湯船) which specifically refers to the bath with water) are usually left filled with water overnight, and in some households the water is reused or recycled for washing clothes the next day. As in the West, it was the custom for more than one member of the family to use the same bath water, though that custom mostly ended in the West while it continued in Japan. In Japan, it is expected to "clean" oneself before entering the furo by rinsing without soap. In Japan, this is believed to be "cleaner" to do before sharing bathwater.

Furo are part of the Japanese ritual of bathing, not meant for washing but rather for relaxing and warming oneself. Washing is carried out separately outside the yubune. The bather should enter the water only after rinsing or lightly showering. Generally Japanese bathrooms are small by Western standards, so the bathroom is set up much like a walk-in shower area but containing the furo. Since the bathroom is a complete wet area, in modern buildings and ryokan heating is provided by air conditioners overhead. The water is hot, usually about 38 to 42 °C (100 to 108 °F).

A modern furo may be made of acrylic, and the top of the range models fitted with a re-circulation system (oidaki) which filters and re-heats the water. This system is connected with the hot water heater, either gas/propane fired or electric/heat pump types. Luxury models are still made out of traditional or expensive woods like hinoki, and can be retrofitted with Western-style fittings and used as signature pieces by architects and interior designers internationally.

== See also ==
- Onsen (bathing facility at hot springs)
- Sentō (communal bath house)
