= Uikousen =

2024 song by Ui Shigure

"Uikousen" is a song by Shigure Ui, a Japanese illustrator and virtual YouTuber. Its music video was released on YouTube on May 30, 2025. It appears on her second full album, Fiction, released on September 11, 2024.

== Overview ==
Against the backdrop of VTuber culture and internet culture, it depicts the struggles and hopes of young people living in modern society with a pop and addictive sound. The lyrics are sprinkled with humorous yet emotional phrases like "Let's set sail on a big ship gathering all the otaku" and "Press the button for paradise, dance for heaven".

== Musicality and reception ==
This song features a melody reminiscent of Touhou Project's "U.N. Owen wa Kanojo nanoka?" and has garnered online praise for being "great for live performances" and "highly addictive." The music video sparked discussion with its unique visuals, showing Shigure Ui firing beams and playing Tetris.

== Other notes ==
This song is frequently performed at Shigure Ui's live events and streams, making it one of the symbolic tracks in her career.
