= IOSYS discography =

The Japanese dōjin circle and musical ensemble IOSYS has self-released over 300 CDs since 1999.

== As IOSYS ==
=== Major Albums ===
Title	Release date	Label	Catalog number
Takahashi Meijin Densetsu - Tamashii no 16 Rensha - (高橋名人伝説 - 魂の16連射 -)	2010-01-27	Beat Shake Records	HBSR-8014P

=== Major Singles ===
Title	Release date	Label	Catalog number
Yume to Utsutsu to Hatsuyume to ~Character Songs & Remixes~ (幻界と現界と初夢と ～Character Songs & Remixes～)	2010-12-29	Pony Canyon	DMCS.00019

=== Dōjin Works ===
Title	Release date	Catalog number
armED chiLD	1999-01-15	IO-0001
in the end of the age	1999-01-15	IO-0002
High-technology (ハイテクノロジー)	1999-01-15	IO-0003
IOSYS Dou Deshō (イオシスどうでしょう)	1999-01-15	IO-0004
FINAL FANTASY VIII beatmania Mix	1999-03-28	IO-0005
High Quality (ハイクオリティー)	1999-03-28	IO-0006
End of Holiday original sound trax	1999-03-28	IO-0007
Gekkan IOSYS vol.1 (月刊イオシスョ vol.1)	1999-03-28	IO-0008
IOSYS, Shitemasuka? (イオシス、してますか？)	1999-04-01	IO-0009
minimal office	1999-05-05	IO-0010
wave ride	1999-05-05	IO-0011
THE DONADONA	1999-05-05	IO-0012
Gekkan IOSYS vol.2 (月刊イオシスョ vol.2)	1999-05-05	IO-0013
20kHz	1999-06-04	IO-0014
Gekkan IOSYS vol.3 (月刊イオシスョ vol.3)	1999-08-15	IO-0016
Gekkan IOSYS Gōgai ~Utage~ (月刊イオシスョ号外～宴～)	1999-09-09	IO-0017
Five Colors of Mana	1999-10-10	IO-0018
Gekkan IOSYS vol.4 (月刊イオシスョ vol.4)	1999-10-10	IO-0019
Ja, IOSYS de. (じゃ、イオシスで。)	1999-10-10	IO-0020
i need all E.P.	1999-11-11	IO-0021
green leaf	1999-11-11	IO-0022
Gekkan IOSYS vol.5 (月刊イオシスョ vol.5)	2000-01-01	IO-0023
ALIVE or NOTHING <high-technique++>	2000-01-18	IO-0024
Famicom CD1 (ファミコンCD1)	2000-04-04	IO-0025
Gekkan Ahodesu vol.1 (月肝アホデスョ vol.1)	2000-05-05	IO-0026
Famicom CD2 (ファミコンCD2)	2000-06-06	IO-0027
Gekkan Ahodesu vol.2 (月肝アホデスョ vol.2)	2000-07-07	IO-0028
minimal fiction	2000-08-01	IO-0030
loveless life E.P.	2000-08-01	IO-0033
Famicom CD3 (ファミコンCD3)	2000-08-27	IO-0029
CORE IOSYS DEATH.	2000-09-22	IO-0032
Gekkan Ahodesu vol.3 (月肝アホデスョ vol.3)	2000-09-30	IO-0031
Famicom CD4 (ファミコンCD4)	2001-01-01	IO-0034
Gekkan Ahodesu Gōgai ~Mu~ (月肝アホデスョ号外 ～無～)	2001-03-25	IO-0035
finetuner	2001-04-04	IO-0036
Famicom CD5 (ファミコンCD5)	2001-07-22	IO-0038
Gyarugei CD (ギャルゲーCD)	2001-08-08	IO-0037
That's Doraemondo (ザッツドラエモンドー)	2001-10-10	IO-0039
The Best of IOSYS (ザベストオブイオシスョ)	2001-10-10	IO-0040
The Ka←Mu Tōjō!! (ザ・カ←ム登場！！)	2001-11-11	IO-0042
TOY DOLL COMPLEX	2001-11-11	IO-0048
Yappa Multi ka. ~IOSYS CD Shichōban~ (やっぱマルチか。～イオシスCD試聴盤～)	2001-11-18	IO-0043
Gomi CD (ゴミCD))	2001-12-12	IO-0046
Fuyu / Snake & Frog (冬 / Snake & Frog)	2001-12-21	IO-0047
Kōkaku Kidōtai 2 MANMACHINE INTERFACE Image Soundtrack (攻殻機動隊2 MANMACHINE INTERFACE イメージサウンドトラック))	2001-12-22	IO-0049
Gyarugei CD2 (ギャルゲーCD2)	2002-01-18	IO-0045
Famicom CD6 (ファミコンCD6)	2002-03-21	IO-0050
20c -D.wat. musical works	2002-04-08	IO-0041
stardust	2002-08-08	IO-0051
Itte CD (逝ってョCD)	2002-08-08	IO-0052
Yodoba CD (ヨドバCD)	2002-12-30	IO-0053
Toire CD (トイレCD)	2002-12-30	IO-0055
Iraq CD (イラクCD)	2003-03-15	IO-0044
Saitama CD (さいたまCD)	2003-08-17	IO-0054
ESCAPE	2003-08-17	IO-0057
Toire CD Full Throttle (トイレCD フルスロットル)	2003-12-30	IO-0056
Itte CDDX (逝ってョCDDX)	2003-12-30	IO-0058
BLIND DIVE	2003-12-30	IO-0060
Toire CD Revolution-nu (トイレCD レボリューションヌ)	2004-03-21	IO-0061
Ramen CD (ラーメンCD)	2004-06-30	IO-0059
Nurupo CD1 (ぬるぽCD1)	2004-08-10	IO-0062
Denpa Special ~Katte ni Shōhin PR Song Shū~ (電波スペシャル ～勝手に商品PRソング集～)	2004-11-11	IO-1001
Nurupo CD2 (ぬるぽCD2)	2004-11-19	IO-0065
Nurupo CD Gōgai ~Denpa Special Tokushū~ (ぬるぽCD号外 ～電波スペシャル特集～)	2004-12-15	IO-0066
22c	2004-12-30	IO-0064P
Nurupo CD3 (ぬるぽCD3)	2005-05-05	IO-0067
Okusan, Denpadesu yo (奥さん、でんぱですよ！)	2005-07-07	IO-0070
Famicom CDDX (ファミコンCDDX)	2005-08-08	IO-0063
A La Maid: Yōkoso Milk Hall e (ア・ラ・メイド ようこそミルクホールへ)	2005-08-08	IO-0068
Matāri CD (マターリCD)	2005-08-08	IO-0069
DEATH chronicle	2005-09-18	IO-0072
BEAT chronicle	2005-09-18	IO-0073
Gekkan Haitenai 10-gatsu-gō Ōmori (月刊はいてない10月号大盛)	2005-10-10	IO-0077
Gekkan Haitenai 11-gatsu-gō (月刊はいてない11月号)	2005-11-10	IO-0078
Gekkan Haitenai 12-gatsu-gō Ōmori (月刊はいてない12月号大盛)	2005-12-10	IO-0079
Kiyohara no Naku Koro ni (キヨハラのなく頃に)	2005-12-30	IO-0071
Itte CD Terawarosu (逝ってョCDテラワロス)	2005-12-30	IO-0074
Itte CD Terayabasu (逝ってョCDテラヤバス)	2005-12-30	IO-0075
Maria-sama ga Miteru ~JAZZ~ (マリア様がみてる～JAZZ～)	2005-12-30	IO-0076
Gekkan Haitenai 1-gatsu-gō (月刊はいてない1月号)	2006-01-10	IO-0080
Gekkan Haitenai 2-gatsu-gō Ōmori (月刊はいてない2月号大盛)	2006-02-10	IO-0081
Gekkan Haitenai 3-gatsu-gō (月刊はいてない3月号)	2006-03-10	IO-0082
Gekkan Haitenai 4-gatsu-gō Ōmori (月刊はいてない4月号大盛)	2006-04-10	IO-0083
Gekkan Haitenai 5-gatsu-gō (月刊はいてない5月号)	2006-05-10	IO-0084
Doku Juice CD vol.1 (毒ジュースCD vol.1)	2006-05-10	IO-0091
Tōhō desu kedo Nanika? (東方ですけど何か？)	2006-05-21	IO-0089
Tōhō Kazakuraen (東方風櫻宴)	2006-05-21	IO-0090
Gekkan Haitenai 6-gatsu-gō (月刊はいてない6月号)	2006-06-10	IO-0085
Gekkan Haitenai 7-gatsu-gō Ōmori (月刊はいてない7月号大盛)	2006-07-10	IO-0086
Doku Juice CD vol.2 (毒ジュースCD vol.2)	2006-07-10	IO-0092
Famicom CD Classic (ファミコンCDクラシック)	2006-07-28	IO-0096
Gekkan Haitenai 8-gatsu-gō (月刊はいてない8月号)	2006-08-10	IO-0087
Maria-sama dake wa Gachi!! (マリア様だけはガチ!!)	2006-08-13	IO-0098
8-ji Jane! Haitenai Zenin Shūgō (8時じゃねえョ！はいてない全員集合)	2006-08-13	IO-0099
Tōhō Otome Bayashi (東方乙女囃子)	2006-08-13	IO-0100
Shinjō no Naku Koro ni: Kai (シンジョウのなく頃に 改)	2006-08-13	IO-0118
Gekkan Haitenai 9-gatsu-gō Ōmori (月刊はいてない9月号大盛)	2006-09-10	IO-0088
Doku Juice CD vol.3 (毒ジュースCD vol.3)	2006-09-10	IO-0093
Dōmin Zasshi Ioriti 10-gatsu-gō (道民雑誌イォリティ10月号)	2006-10-10	IO-0101
Doku Juice CD vol.4 (毒ジュースCD vol.4)	2006-11-10	IO-0094
Dōmin Zasshi Ioriti 11-gatsu-gō (道民雑誌イォリティ11月号)	2006-11-10	IO-0102
Dōmin Zasshi Ioriti 12-gatsu-gō (道民雑誌イォリティ12月号)	2006-12-10	IO-0103
Grand Slam 2006 (グランドスラム2006)	2006-12-31	IO-0097
Tōhō Tsukitōrō (東方月燈籠)	2006-12-31	IO-0117
Dōmin Zasshi Ioriti 1-gatsu-gō (道民雑誌イォリティ1月号)	2007-01-10	IO-0104
Dōmin Zasshi Ioriti 2-gatsu-gō (道民雑誌イォリティ2月号)	2007-02-10	IO-0105
AMX Gakuen Hōsō-bu! Feb'07 (AMX学園放送部！ Feb'07)	2007-02-25	IO-0121
Dōmin Zasshi Ioriti 3-gatsu-gō (道民雑誌イォリティ3月号)	2007-03-10	IO-0106
AMX Gakuen Hōsō-bu! Mar'07 (AMX学園放送部！ Mar'07)	2007-03-25	IO-0122
Dōmin Zasshi Ioriti 4-gatsu-gō (道民雑誌イォリティ4月号)	2007-04-10	IO-0107
AMX Gakuen Hōsō-bu! Apr'07 (AMX学園放送部！ Apr'07)	2007-04-25	IO-0123
Sekaiju no Omochabako (世界樹のおもちゃ箱)	2007-04-30	IO-0120
Sangokushi NOW da! (三国志NOWだ！)	2007-04-30	IO-0126
Dōmin Zasshi Ioriti 5-gatsu-gō (道民雑誌イォリティ5月号)	2007-05-10	IO-0108
Tōhō Eijanhō (東方永雀峰)	2007-05-20	IO-0130
AMX Gakuen Hōsō-bu! May'07 (AMX学園放送部！ May'07)	2007-05-25	IO-0124
Dōmin Zasshi Ioriti 6-gatsu-gō (道民雑誌イォリティ6月号)	2007-06-10	IO-0109
Dōmin Zasshi Ioriti 7-gatsu-gō (道民雑誌イォリティ7月号)	2007-07-10	IO-0110
WBBC2007	2007-07-25	IO-0131
Dōmin Zasshi Ioriti 8-gatsu-gō (道民雑誌イォリティ8月号)	2007-08-10	IO-0111
Sweet	2007-08-17	IO-0113
Sangokushi NOW da! Natsu no Kanshasai Ariake no Utage (三国志NOWだ！ 夏の感謝祭・ありあけの宴)	2007-08-17	IO-0127
Tōhō Suisuisūsū (東方萃翠酒酔)	2007-08-17	IO-0140
AMX Gakuen Hōsō-bu! Aug'07 (AMX学園放送部！ Aug'07)	2007-08-25	IO-0132
Dōmin Zasshi Ioriti 9-gatsu-gō (道民雑誌イォリティ9月号)	2007-09-10	IO-0112
AMX Gakuen Hōsō-bu! Sep'07 (AMX学園放送部！ Sep'07)	2007-09-25	IO-0133
AMX Gakuen Hōsō-bu! Oct'07 (AMX学園放送部！ Oct'07)	2007-10-25	IO-0134
Gossun Toka no Karaoke (ごっすんとかのからおけ)	2007-11-11	IO-0095
AMX Gakuen Hōsō-bu! Nov'07 (AMX学園放送部！ Nov'07)	2007-11-25	IO-0135
WBBC2007 Fuyu (WBBC2007冬)	2007-12-12	IO-0136
Sangokushi NOW da! ver.2.99 (三国志NOWだ！ver.2.99)	2007-12-31	IO-0128
Tōhō Kasokusōchi (東方河想狗蒼池)	2007-12-31	IO-0141
Neko Miko Toka no Karaoke (ねこみことかのからおけ)	2008-03-03	IO-0115
Anison o Sugoi Opera Koe de Utatte Mita (アニソンをすごいオペラ声で歌ってみた)	2008-03-31	IO-0116
Tōhō Makashinsai (東方真華神祭)	2008-05-25	IO-0142
Gossun Remix Ain (ごっすんリミックス アイン)	2008-05-25	IO-0143
Gossun Remix Tsubain (ごっすんリミックス ツバイン)	2008-05-25	IO-0144
Sangokushi NOW da! Ver. 3.594 (三国志NOWだ！Ver. 3.594)	2008-08-17	IO-0129
We are"IOSYS".	2008-08-17	IO-0145
Tōhō Sōyū Shinpi (東方想幽森雛)	2008-08-17	IO-0146
WBBC2008	2008-09-13	IO-0137
Osaisen Toka no Karaoke (おさいせんとかのからおけ)	2008-10-13	IO-0138
voild child	2008-10-13	IO-0139
Nettō! Meruhen Ōzumō Digest 08-nen 7-gatsu Bashō (熱闘！メルヘン大相撲ダイジェスト08年7月場所)	2008-10-13	IOH-0001
Nettō! Meruhen Ōzumō Digest 08-nen 8-gatsu Bashō (熱闘！メルヘン大相撲ダイジェスト08年8月場所)	2008-10-13	IOH-0002
Nettō! Meruhen Ōzumō Digest 08-nen 9-gatsu Bashō (熱闘！メルヘン大相撲ダイジェスト08年9月場所)	2008-10-13	IOH-0003
A&D WORKS Jikken Gekijō Vol.1 Sound Drama ~Cure~ (A&D WORKS実験劇場 Vol.1 サウンドドラマ ～Cure～)	2008-10-13	IOH-0004
Tōhō Hyōsetsu Kashū (東方氷雪歌集)	2008-11-02	IO-0147
IOSYS 10-shūnen Kinen Talk Live DVD (イオシス10周年記念トークライブDVD)	2008-11-11	IO-0119
milk	2008-12-29	IO-0114
Tōhō Hōmatsutengoku (東方泡沫天獄)	2008-12-29	IO-0149
Are you"IOSYS"?	2008-12-29	IO-0150
WBBC2008 Fuyu (WBBC2008冬)	2008-12-29	IOH-0005
Dekiru Misoji ☆ Shirafu-hen (できる三十路☆シラフ編)	2008-12-29	IOH-0006
Tōhō Chotto Matten (東方超都魔転)	2009-03-08	IO-0154
bloom	2009-03-08	IO-0155
Hokushin Kaidō (北辰街道)	2009-03-08	IO-0158
Tōhō Tsukitōrō Safe! (東方月燈籠セーフ!)	2009-04-05	IO-0148
Shall we "IOSYS"?	2009-05-05	IO-0156
Kimi to Deatte Ni-nen Sugoshita Watashi ga Bimyō ni Kawatta Riyū (君と出会って二年過ごした私が微妙に変わった理由)	2009-05-05	IO-0160
Tōhō Nengara Nenjū (東方年柄年中)	2009-08-15	IO-0157
Bitter	2009-08-15	IO-0161
WBBC2009	2009-08-15	IOH-0007
Tōhō JeuXinTerdiTs (東方JeuXinTerdiTs)	2009-12-12	IO-0164
Ayuson*Antipasto* (あゆそん*Antipasto*)	2009-12-30	IO-0162
Wow! Hyper Denpa-chan - ARM Shōgyō Sakuhinshū - (ワァオ！ハイパー電波チャン - ARM商業作品集 -)	2009-12-30	IO-0165
Aka to Nomiya mo Yonde Mita 2009 (Kari) OFFICIAL EVENT DVD (赤と野宮も呼んでみた2009（仮）OFFICIAL EVENT DVD)	2009-12-30	IO-0167
Tōhō Ageha (東方アゲハ)	2010-02-14	IO-0170
Tōhō Ginshōtengoku (東方銀晶天獄)	2010-03-14	IO-0163
Moero! Tōhō Brass Band (燃えろ！東方ブラスバンド)	2010-05-05	IO-0168
Tōhō Faithful Star (東方Faithful Star)	2010-07-11	IO-0169
Kazaoto Resonansick (風音レゾナンシック)	2010-07-25	IO-0172
Tōhō Utau Cirno-chan (東方うたうチルノちゃん)	2010-08-14	IO-0171
Tōhō Koi Ichigo Musume+ (東方恋苺娘+)	2010-08-14	IO-0177
WBBC2010 THe FinaL	2010-08-14	IOH-0010
Tōhō IO-BEST BEATS (東方IO-BEST BEATS)	2010-09-19	IO-0180
Tōhō Merry-go-round (東方メリーゴーランド)	2010-09-19	IO-0181
Kimi ga Mitsumeru Sora no Sakini (きみが見つめる空の先に)	2010-09-25	IO-0173
Tōhō Fushigikakumei (東方浮思戯革命)	2010-10-11	IO-0178
Roku-jō Hitoma no Dancehall (六畳一間のダンスホール)	2010-11-25	IO-0174
Tōhō Unfufūfu (東方云符不普)	2010-12-30	IO-0184
Megapeer DJ Battlers (メガピアDJバトラーズ)	2010-12-30	IOB-0004
Haitenai Soine CD (はいてない添い寝CD)	2010-12-31	IOH-0011
Tōhō Meringue Shōjo Yakō (東方メレンゲ少女夜行)	2011-03-13	IO-0186
Re:Candid! ARM Tōhō Remix (リ:キャンディッド! ARM東方リミックス)	2011-03-13	IO-0190
Tōhō Variable Spellcaster (東方Variable Spellcaster)	2011-05-08	IO-0189
Tōhō IO-BEST BEATS 2 (東方IO-BEST BEATS 2)	2011-05-08	IO-0192
Tōhō Ageha DESTINY (東方アゲハ DESTINY)	2011-07-10	IO-0183
Grimoire of IOSYS - Tōhō BEST ALBUM vol.1 - (Grimoire of IOSYS - 東方BEST ALBUM vol.1 -)	2011-07-10	IO-0191
Sengoku Onkei United @OKEHAZAMA (せんごく音系ユナイテッド @OKEHAZAMA)	2011-07-29	IO-0198
Tōhō Precious Ryūsei Shōjo (東方プレシャス流星少女)	2011-08-13	IO-0197
Tōhō Reflection of a Drive (東方Reflection of a Drive)	2011-09-11	IO-0200
Tōhō Telepath Shōjo Kashū (東方テレパス少女歌集)	2011-10-16	IO-0202
Tōhō Electric Denpa Shōjo (東方エレクトリック電波少女)	2011-12-30	IO-0203
Tōhō IO-BEST BEATS 3 (東方IO-BEST BEATS 3)	2012-02-12	IO-0210
Grimoire of IOSYS - Tōhō BEST ALBUM vol.2 - (Grimoire of IOSYS - 東方BEST ALBUM vol.2 -)	2012-02-29	IO-0199
Teppei-sensei no Perfect Violin Kyōshitsu ~ Teppei-sensei x ARM no Tōhō Special Collab ~ (てっぺい先生のパーフェクトヴァイオリン教室 ～ てっぺい先生 × ARM の東方スペシャルコラボ ～)	2012-03-10	IO-0205
Quality Underground	2012-4-22	IO-0217
Tōhō Shiutengoku (東方紫雨天獄)	2012-04-30	IO-0221
Haru da yo! IOSYS Daishūgō! 2012-nen-ban (春だよ！イオシス大集合！2012年版)	2012-04-30	IO-0224
Kazakura SECOND PHANTASMA IOSYS TOHO COMPILATION vol.21 (風櫻 SECOND PHANTASMA IOSYS TOHO COMPILATION vol.21)	2012-05-27	IO-0214
Tōhō Ageha NIGHTMARE (東方アゲハ NIGHTMARE)	2012-05-27	IO-0218
Tōhō Utau Chireiden (東方うたうちれいでん)	2012-07-14	IO-0175
Moero! Tōhō Brass Band Nama (燃えろ！東方ブラスバンド生)	2012-08-11	IO-0229
Papa Love 2-kenme ~Original Soundtrack~ (パパラブ2軒目 ～オリジナル・サウンドトラック～)	2012-9-28	IO-0193
Tōhō Eternal Fantasia (東方Eternal Fantasia)	2012-09-28	IO-0212
Quaky Divines	2012-09-28	IO-0230
Otome Bayashi COLORFUL GIRLS -IOSYS TOHO COMPILATION vol.22- (乙女囃子 COLORFUL GIRLS -IOSYS TOHO COMPILATION vol.22-)	2012-10-07	IO-0234
Night Gypsy - Tōhō JAZZROCK - (Night Gypsy - 東方JAZZROCK -)	2012-10-07	IO-0238
Project U-Ta-Hi-Me Original Soundtrack	2012-10-28	IO-0194
Grimoire of IOSYS - Tōhō BEST ALBUM vol.3 - (Grimoire of IOSYS - 東方BEST ALBUM vol.3 -)	2012-11-30	IO-0201
Oshiete: Shiri-sensei (おしえて しりせんせい)	2012-12-08	IO-0233
TOHO EDM	2012-12-09	IO-0235
ROCKIN'ON TOUHOU VOL.1	2012-12-30	IO-0240
re:takes ～best of minami's toho guitar works～	2013-02-03	IO-0242
PUNK IT!TOUHOU! -IOSYS HITS PUNK COVERS-	2013-03-13	IO-0244
Stellar Nursery	2013-03-31	IO-0243
Haitoku no Phantasmagoria (背徳のファンタスマゴリア)	2013-04-29	IO-0236
ROCKIN'ON TOUHOU VOL.2	2013-05-26	IO-0247
Geki Oko ☆ Magus (げきおこ☆メイガス)	2013-05-26	IO-0249
RoughSketch TOHO WORKS 2007-2012	2013-05-26	IO-0250
Scary Halloween Show	2013-10-13	IO-0255
King of SABUKARUTYA-	2013-10-27	IO-0176
Chinjufu ni Chakunin Shita kedo Shitsumon Aru? (鎮守府に着任したけど質問ある？)	2013-10-27	IO-0256
miko BEST Toho of IOSYS	2013-12-11	IO-0220
Geki Kawa ☆ Vampin' (げきかわ☆ヴァンピン)	2013-12-28	IO-0258
Bauxite ga Soko o Tsuita Kudan (ボーキサイトが底をついた件)	2014-01-19	IO-0259
PUNK IT!TOUHOU!2 - IOSYS HITS PUNK COVERS -	2014-02-02	IO-0257
Nothing but the TOHO EDM	2014-03-30	IO-0239
ROCKIN'ON TOUHOU VOL.3	2014-05-11	IO-0262
Hyper Denpa Collection! -Freedom ★ Tōhō-hen- (はいぱぁ電波これくしょん！ -フリーダム★東方編-)	2014-05-11	IO-0263
Prank Masters!	2014-05-11	IO-0264
Hangyaku no Phantasmagoria (叛逆のファンタスマゴリア)	2014-05-11	IO-0265
Black Chinjufu ni Arigachi na Koto (ブラック鎮守府にありがちなこと)	2014-08-08	IO-0268
V-ROCK TOUHOU	2014-10-12	IO-0274
Steampunk Rapsodia (スチームパンク・ラプソディア)	2014-10-26	IO-0276
IOSYS Aki no Nikushoku Matsuri 2014 (イオシス秋の肉食祭2014)	2014-10-26	IO-0280
Yamatai ★ Night Party (ヤマタイ★ナイトパーティー)	2014-10-26	IO-0281
Across Phantasm	2014-11-24	IO-0275
Night Zealot - Tōhō JAZZROCK2 - (Night Zealot - 東方JAZZROCK2 -)	2014-11-24	IO-0277
Geki Pyosu ☆ Puppet (げきぴょす☆パペット)	2014-11-24	IO-0278
まじかる☆ジゴワット	2015-04-26	IO-0287
#TOHO_SEAWAVES	2015-05-10	IO-0284
GENSOKYO DEMPA EXPO -IOSYS Tōhō Compilation vol.23- (GENSOKYO DEMPA EXPO ─イオシス東方コンピレーション vol.23─)	2015-05-10	IO-0285
ROCKIN'ON TOUHOU VOL.4	2015-05-10	IO-0286
Tōhō Bakumari Taisen myu314(COOL&CREATE) vs ARM(IOSYS) Dengeki Match-up (東方爆まり大戦 myu314(COOL&CREATE) vs ARM(IOSYS) 電撃マッチアップ)	2015-05-10	IOCC-001
PUNK IT!TOUHOU!3 - IOSYS HITS PUNK COVERS -	2015-10-18	IO-0291
IOSYS TOHO MEGAMIX - GENSOKYO HOUSE EDITION -	2015-10-18	IO-0294
Haunted Halloween Town	2015-10-18	IO-0295
Hyper Denpa Collection! Amazing ★ Enjō-hen (はいぱぁ電波これくしょん！ アメイジング★炎上編)	2015-10-25	IO-0293
MAGIC TO MUSIC TOHO	2015-12-28	IO-0297
Geki Rimi! -Geki Oko Series Remix- (げきリミ！ ─げきおこシリーズリミックス─)	2015-12-28	IO-0298
IOSYS Otogē BEST!! -Tōhō Arange-hen- (IOSYS音ゲーBEST!! —東方アレンジ編—)	2016-01-31	IO-0296
DREAM TO MUSIC TOHO	2016-03-13	IO-0301
Fantastic Picoration (ファンタジックぴこれーしょん!)	2016-04-24	IO-0300
ROCKIN'ON TOUHOU VOL.5	2016-05-08	IO-0302
MIRACLE TO MUSIC TOHO	2016-06-19	IO-0303
Touhou Hits Covers —Ska Punk Flavor—	2016-08-13	IO-0306
Spooky Halloween Tour	2016-10-09	IO-0307
Tōhō Gokurakutoukai -IOSYS Tōhō Compilation vol.24- (東方極楽湯界 ─イオシス東方コンピレーション vol.24─)	2016-10-16	IO-0309
MADE in KYUN-CTUARY☆ (メイド・イン・きゅんクチュアリ☆)	2016-10-30	IO-0310
Kirei na IOSYS (きれいなイオシス)	2017-01-15	IO-0308
Hyper Denpa Collection! Fantastic ★ Yamato-hen (はいぱぁ電波これくしょん！ ファンタスティック★大和編)	2017-04-30	IO-0312
Tōhō Golden Time -IOSYS Tōhō Compilation vol.25- (東方ゴールデンタイム ─イオシス東方コンピレーション vol.25─)	2017-05-07	IO-0313
Tōhō Freestyle Dungeon (東方フリースタイル弾ジョン)	2017-05-07	IO-0314
Tōhō Hyōsetsu Daikansha -Cirno no Perfect Sansū Kyōshitsu 9-shūnen Kinen Compilation Album- (東方氷雪大感謝 —チルノのパーフェクトさんすう教室⑨周年記念コンピレーションアルバム—)	2017-10-15	IO-0311
ROCKIN'ON TOUHOU The Best	2017-10-15	IO-0315
Tōhō Freestyle Dungeon Rec7 (東方フリースタイル弾ジョン Rec7)	2017-10-15	IO-0316
ROCKIN'ON TOUHOU VOL.6	2018-04-29	IO-0317
Anison o Sugoi Opera Koe de Utatte Mita+ (アニソンをすごいオペラ声で歌ってみた+)	2018-04-29	IO-0318
Tenkū Candy ☆ Star (天空キャンディ☆スター)	2018-05-06	IO-0319
ROCKIN'ON TOUHOU VOL.7	2018-10-14	IO-0320
IOSYS TOHO MEGAMIX - GENSOKYO IIKYOKU EDITION - Mixed by DJ sada	2019-05-05	IO-0324
TOHO BOOTLEGS	2019-05-05	IO-0325
ROCKIN'ON TOUHOU VOL.8	2019-10-06	IO-0323
Minna no Perfect Chirpa Tengoku - Cirno no Perfect Sanū Kyōshitsu Cover Album - (みんなのパーフェクトチルパ天国 - チルノのパーフェクトさんすう教室カバーアルバム -)	2019-10-06	IO-0326
TOHO BOOTLEGS 2	2019-10-06	IO-0328
Virtual World ga Bokura no Machi ni Yattekita (バーチャルワールドが僕らの町にやってきた)	2019-10-27	IO-0322
Animal Strike! (アニマル・ストライク!)	2019-10-27	IO-0327
Tōhō Komainukachō (東方狛犬歌帖)	2020-03-01	IO-0331
TOHO BOOTLEGS 3	2020-03-22	IO-0329
IOSYS TOHO MEGAMIX - GENSOKYO SUGOIKYOKU EDITION - Mixed by DJ sada	2020-03-22	IO-0330
TOHO BOOTLEGS 4	2021-08-28	IO-0332
Scarlet Keisatsu Shōshūhen Haru no Tokubetsukeikai Special (スカーレット警察・総集編 春の特別警戒スペシャル)	2022-05-08	IO-0333
TOHO BOOTLEGS 5	2022-10-23	IO-0334
IOSYS ALL TIME TOHO BEST COLLECTION	2023-04-30	IO-0335
TOHO BOOTLEGS 6	2023-05-07	IO-0336
IOSYS RHYTHMICAL WORKS PERFECT HITS	2023-10-10	IO-0337
IOSYS RHYTHMICAL WORKS CRITICAL HITS	2023-10-10	IO-0338
TOHO BOOTLEGS 7	2023-10-10	IO-0339

== As IOSYS jk Girls (イオシスjkガールズ) ==
=== Major Singles ===
Title	Release date	Label	Catalog number
Stalemate! (すているめいと！)	2014-02-26	Media Factory	ZMCZ-9121

== As IOSYS TRAX ==
Title	Release date	Catalog number
I/O/P SELECTED vol.01	2013-10-27	IOTX-0001
GOOD MUSIC ONiiCHAN ～I/O/P SELECTED vol.02～	2016-04-24	IOTX-0002
Kanzen Yūshō ~I/O/P SELECTED vol.03~ (完全優勝 ～I/O/P SELECTED vol.03～)	2016-10-30	IOTX-0003
Bazurizushi ~I/O/P SELECTED vol.04~ (バズリズシ ～I/O/P SELECTED vol.04～)	2017-04-30	IOTX-0004
SUGOI DANCE ～I/O/P SELECTED Vol.5～	2017-10-29	IOTX-0005
New Normal Party Music ~ I/O/P SELECTED Vol.6 (ニュー・ノーマル・パーティミュージック ～ I/O/P SELECTED Vol.6)	2021-10-31	IOTX-0006

== As ALBATROSICKS ==
Title	Release date	Catalog number
ALBATROSICKS (アルバトロシクス)	2007-12-31	IO-5001
PLANET LIBERATION	2008-08-17	IO-5002
e	2008-12-29	IO-5003
STAR CRACKER	2009-08-15	IO-5004
PARAMOUNT FEVER!!!!!!!!!!11111	2010-08-14	IO-5005
AERAS	2011-08-13	IO-5007
rebirth era	2011-12-30	IO-5008
MERGE THE STRAWBERRY!	2010-12-31	IO-5011
ALBATROSICKS BEST ALBUM	2012-08-11	IO-5009
DEKKAINO	2014-08-17	IO-5101
CHICCHAINO	2014-12-30	IO-5102
SHINING SPACE DEBRIS 2015	2015-12-31	IO-5103
ALBATROSICKS THE FINAL	2017-12-02	IO-5104

== As Yuunoumi (ユウノウミ) ==
Title	Release date	Catalog number
Teigai Tectonics (定概テクトニクス)	2008-12-29	IOY-0001
Tōhō Hectopascal (東方ヘクトパスカル)	2009-08-15	IOY-0003
Tōhō Love Stream (東方ラブストリーム)	2009-12-30	IOY-0004
Tōhō Independence (東方インデペンダンス)	2010-08-14	IOY-0005
Kirisame Requiem (霧雨レクイエム)	2010-12-30	IOY-0006
Ore no Cirno ga Konnani Tensai na Wakeganai (俺のチルノがこんなに天才なわけがない)	2011-08-13	IOY-0007
Tōhō Hitozuma Yōchien (東方人妻ようちえん)	2011-12-30	IOY-0008
ENCYCLOPEDIA <Hito> human beings (ENCYCLOPEDIA <人> human beings)	2012-05-27	IOY-0009
ENCYCLOPEDIA <Ma> magical beings (ENCYCLOPEDIA <魔> magical beings)	2012-05-27	IOY-0010
ENCYCLOPEDIA <Yō> monstrous beings (ENCYCLOPEDIA <妖> monstrous beings	2012-08-11	IOY-0011
Toho Warfare:BLACK	2012-08-11	IOY-0012
Toho Warfare:BLACK ONYX	2012-12-30	IOY-0013
Toho Warfare:BLACK SWORD	2013-08-12	IOY-0014
Toho Warfare:BLACK SOUL	2013-12-30	IOY-0015
Wadatsumi (海神 wadatsumi)	2013-12-30	IOY-0016
Toho Warfare:BLACK BRAVE	2014-08-16	IOY-0017
Toho Warfare:BLACK I+II+III+EX	2014-12-29	IOY-0018
Shigo Risutora Niau God never knows, but you know me. (死後リストラにあう God never knows, but you know me.)	2014-12-29	IOY-0019
Toho Warfare:BLACK SPARK	2015-08-14	IOY-0020
Toho Darkness:Pierce the DESTINY	2015-12-30	IOY-0021
Aoki Hibana no Shi edge-s pain (青キ火花ノ詩 edge-s pain)	2016-08-13	IOY-0022
Toho Warfare:MASTERMIND	2016-08-13	IOY-0023
Toho Maboroshi Stars	2018-08-10	IOY-0025

== As Project RIOSS ==
Title	Release date	Catalog number
SCARLET FICTION	2018-08-10	RIOSS-001

== As OTAKU-ELITE Recordings ==
Title	Release date	Catalog number
what do you want/Boku no Natsu Shūryō no Oshirase (what do you want/僕の夏終了のおしらせ)	2008-08-01	OER-0002
Sangokushi NOW da! ver3.594 (三国志NOWだ！ver3.594)	2008-08-17	OER-0001
ABLITROSICKS (アブリトロシクス)	2008-10-13	OER-0003
Purple and Cherrypink	2008-12-29	OER-0004
Ruby and Aquamarine	2009-03-08	OER-0005
Nothing is Liberated	2009-08-01	OER-0006
Sangokushi NOW da! Ver.3.5963 (三国志NOWだ！ Ver.3.5963)	2009-08-15	OER-0007
Tsukuyomi and Amateras	2009-08-15	OER-0008
Hakutaku ☆ Ribbon Maji Kimo Kē ne (はくたく☆りぼん まじキモけーね)	2009-12-30	OER-0009
Tabibito to, Sono Koibito (旅人と、その恋人)	2009-12-30	OER-0011
Sensha o Karite, ■■ha (戦車を駆りて、■■は)	2010-10-11	OER-0012
Kijo ga Ikiru, Kono Sekai (貴女が生きる、この世界)	2011-03-13	OER-0013
OER toho REWORX vol.1	2011-03-13	OER-0014
OER toho REWORX vol.1+2	2011-08-13	OER-0015
Lost in the silent ocean EP	2012-05-27	OER-0016
OTAKU-ELITE's Crystal DISCO	2012-07-14	OER-1001
KEINE KAMISHIRASAWA - The Chosen Place of Yours -	2012-08-12	OER-0017
Opium and Purple haze EP	2014-05-11	OER-2001
Spade and Diamond EP	2014-08-16	OER-2002
QUEEN'S TROOPS	2016-05-08	OER-0018
OER WHITELABEL C90	2016-08-14	OER-3001
OER WHITELABEL C91	2016-12-31	OER-3002
BASSLINE SUCCUBUS EP	2018-12-30	OER-3003

== As MOF ==
Title	Release date	Catalog number
AKKUMA TIME 6:66/mgmg Happy (AKKUMA TIME 6:66/mgmg はっぴー)	2016-04-24	MOF-001

== As program YMG ==
Title	Release date	Catalog number
Scramble!	2009-12-12	IOH-0008
Megane Holic	2010-05-05	IOH-0009

== As Sugar Honey Babies ==
Title	Release date	Catalog number
Koi no Love Love Hatsu Date (恋のラブラブ初デート)	2011-05-01	SHB-0001
Zenryokushissō Manatsu Shōjo (全力疾走真夏少女)	2011-08-13	SHB-0002
Sweet Happy Blanket	2011-12-31	SHB-0003

== As monoROSETTA ==
Title	Release date	Catalog number
GREATEST HITS(Yotei) Vol.1 (GREATEST HITS(予定) Vol.1)	2011-05-08	MONR-0001
Koi no Recipe to Et Cetera (恋のレシピとエトセトラ)	2011-12-30	MONR-0002
Sweet Beat TV	2012-05-27	MONR-0003
Lotus Land St.	2012-08-11	MONR-0004

== As M-COMMUNICATIONS ==
Title	Release date	Catalog number
Tōhō Double Maximization (東方Double Maximization)	2012-04-15	MCO-002
WE wa Final Nihon (WEはファイナル日本)	2013-06-30	MCO-003
ROCK N' HUMANITY vol.1	2013-12-31	MCO-004

== As ARM no Armageddon Records (ARMのArmageddon Records) ==
Title	Release date	Catalog number
infinity	2011-12-30	ARM-0001
distant	2012-05-27	ARM-0002
