= Police in a Pod =

Japanese manga series

- First tankōbon volume cover, featuring Mai Kawai

ハコヅメ～交番女子の逆襲～ (Hakozume: Kōban Joshi no Gyakushū)
- Genre: Comedy
- Manga
- Written by: Miko Yasu
- Published by: Kodansha
- English publisher: NA: Kodansha USA (digital)
- Imprint: Morning KC
- Magazine: Morning
- Original run: November 22, 2017 – present
- Volumes: 23
- Television drama
- Directed by: Seiichi Nagumo; Shintaro Sugawara; Shunpei Marutani; Akiki Ito
- Written by: Nemoto Nonji
- Music by: Akio Izutsu
- Studio: Nippon Television
- Original network: NNS (Nippon TV)
- Original run: July 7, 2021 – September 15, 2021
- Episodes: 9 + 2 special episodes
- Anime television series
- Directed by: Yuzo Sato
- Written by: Ryunosuke Kingetsu
- Music by: Nobuaki Nobusawa
- Studio: Madhouse (Note: Animation production assistance (アニメーション制作協力) for all episodes provided by DR Movie.)
- Licensed by: Crunchyroll: SA/SEA: Muse Communication
- Original network: AT-X, Tokyo MX, KBS Kyoto, SUN, TV Aichi, BS NTV
- English network: SEA: Animax Asia
- Original run: January 5, 2022 – March 30, 2022
- Episodes: 13
- icon

Police in a Pod (Note: Japanese: ハコヅメ ～交番女子の逆襲～, Hepburn: Hakozume: Kōban Joshi no Gyakushū; "Packed Up: A Police Box Woman's Counterattack") is a Japanese manga series written and illustrated by Miko Yasu. It has been serialized in Kodansha's Morning since November 2017. A television drama adaptation aired on Nippon TV from July to September 2021, while an anime television series adaptation produced by Madhouse aired from January to March 2022.

By August 2021, the manga had over 2.3 million copies in circulation. Police in a Pod won the 66th Shogakukan Manga Award in the general category in 2021 and the 46th Kodansha Manga Award in the same category in 2022.

== Plot ==
Mai Kawai is a new police officer who only decided to take the job due to a desire to have a stable income. Having become dissatisfied with her career path, she decides to resign from the police force. On the day she planned to tender her resignation, she meets Seiko Fuji, who had been reassigned to serve as the director of her station. Fuji's dedication to the police force becomes an inspiration to Kawai, who decides to delay her resignation. The series follows the two and other members of the police forms solving crimes in their local area.

== Characters ==
Mai Kawai (川合 麻依, Kawai Mai)
Voiced by: Shion Wakayama
Portrayed by: Mei Nagano
Kawai is a fresh graduate from the police academy. She joined the Okajima Prefectural Police (Note: Okajima Prefecture is a fictitious prefecture, and was changed to Saitama Prefecture in the television drama.) in order to have a stable income unlike her father, whose livelihood was affected by the exploitive practices of his company. However, she has had enough of the unkind treatment received as a police officer and decides to resign, but just as she was about to submit her letter of resignation, she is introduced to Seiko Fuji.
Seiko Fuji (藤 聖子, Fuji Seiko)
Voiced by: Yui Ishikawa
Portrayed by: Erika Toda
Kawai's partner and instructor. She is nicknamed "Miss Perfect". She previously belonged to the local police's Criminal Affairs Division but was reassigned.
Seiji Minamoto (源 誠二, Minamoto Seiji)
Voiced by: Ryōta Suzuki
Portrayed by: Shohei Miura
He is part of the police department's investigation department. His strong interrogation skills have led him to being called an "interrogation genius".
Takeshi Yamada (山田 武志, Yamada Takeshi)
Voiced by: Shimba Tsuchiya
He is also a member of the police department's investigation department, and usually works with Seiji. Takeshi is frequently the target of Seiko's harassment, and thus sees female police officers as gorillas.
Portrayed by: Yuki Yamada
Miwa Makitaka (牧高 美和, Makitaka Miwa)
Voiced by: Kana Hanazawa
Portrayed by: Nanase Nishino
Deputy Captain (副署長, Fuku Shochō)
Voiced by: Kendo Kobayashi
Tamotsu Hōjō (北条 保, Hōjō Tamotsu)
Voiced by: Rikiya Koyama
Portrayed by: Yūsuke Hirayama

== Media ==
=== Manga ===
Written and illustrated by Miko Yasu, Police in a Pod has been serialized in Kodansha's seinen manga magazine Morning since November 22, 2017. The series finished its first part on June 16, 2022, and Yasu put the manga on hiatus to work on a new manga series. Kodansha has collected its chapters into individual tankōbon volumes. The first volume was released on April 23, 2018. As of February 21, 2023, twenty-three volumes have been released.

The series is licensed in English digitally by Kodansha USA. The first volume was released on June 8, 2021. As of June 13, 2023, twenty-three volumes have been released.

==== Volumes ====
No.	Original release date	Original ISBN	English release date	English ISBN
1	April 23, 2018	978-4-06-511322-6	June 8, 2021	978-1-63699-143-6
2	June 22, 2018	978-4-06-511692-0	July 13, 2021	978-1-63699-219-8
3	August 23, 2018	978-4-06-512637-0	August 10, 2021	978-1-63699-293-8
4	October 23, 2018	978-4-06-513020-9	September 14, 2021	978-1-63699-354-6
5	January 23, 2019	978-4-06-514527-2	October 12, 2021	978-1-63699-406-2
6	March 22, 2019	978-4-06-514963-8	November 9, 2021	978-1-63699-461-1
7	May 23, 2019	978-4-06-515420-5	December 14, 2021	978-1-63699-513-7
8	July 23, 2019	978-4-06-516266-8	January 11, 2022	978-1-63699-553-3
9	September 20, 2019	978-4-06-517128-8	February 8, 2022	978-1-63699-606-6
10	November 21, 2019	978-4-06-517759-4	March 8, 2022	978-1-63699-645-5
11	January 23, 2020	978-4-06-518157-7	April 12, 2022	978-1-68491-118-9
12	April 23, 2020	978-4-06-518944-3	May 10, 2022	978-1-68491-164-6
13	June 23, 2020	978-4-06-518966-5	June 14, 2022	978-1-68491-213-1
14	September 23, 2020	978-4-06-518967-2	July 12, 2022	978-1-68491-343-5
15	November 20, 2020	978-4-06-521759-7	August 9, 2022	978-1-68491-385-5
16	March 23, 2021	978-4-06-522711-4	September 13, 2022	978-1-68491-440-1
17	June 23, 2021	978-4-06-523557-7	October 11, 2022	978-1-68491-482-1
18	August 23, 2021	978-4-06-524537-8	November 8, 2022	978-1-68491-538-5
19	November 22, 2021	978-4-06-526127-9	December 13, 2022	978-1-68491-588-0
20	February 22, 2022	978-4-06-526751-6	January 10, 2023	978-1-68491-637-5
21	June 22, 2022	978-4-06-527611-2	February 14, 2023	978-1-68491-702-0
22	October 21, 2022	978-4-06-529572-4	April 11, 2023	978-1-68491-887-4
23	February 21, 2023	978-4-06-531164-6	June 13, 2023	978-1-68491-969-7

=== Drama ===
A Japanese television drama adaptation aired for nine episodes on Nippon TV from July 7 to September 15, 2021. Two special episodes aired on August 4 and August 11, 2021. RöE performed the opening "YY", and milet performed the ending theme "Ordinary Days".

=== Anime ===
An anime television series adaptation was announced on August 1, 2021. The series was animated by Madhouse and directed by Yuzo Sato, with Ryunosuke Kingetsu overseeing the scripts, Kei Tsuchiya designing the characters, and Nobuaki Nobusawa composing the music. It aired from January 5 to March 30, 2022, on AT-X and other networks. Riko Azuna performed the opening theme "Shiranakya" (I Gotta Know), while Nonoc performed the ending theme "Change". Funimation streamed the series outside of Asia. Muse Communication licensed the series in South and Southeast Asia.

==== Episode ====
No.	Title	Directed by	Written by	Storyboarded by	Original release date
1	"Unbox & Punching Bag"; Transliteration: "Anbokkusu Ando Sandobakku" (Japanese: アンボックス&サンドバック)	Kim Minsun	Ryunosuke Kingetsu	Yuzo Sato	January 5, 2022
Kawai, a fresh graduate from police academy, has had enough of the bad rap she has been getting as a member of the police force. However, before she could submit her letter of resignation, a new instructor gets assigned to her. Chief Fuji used to be a detective but got transferred for allegedly harassing one of her juniors. The pair heads off for patrol and Kawai soon witnesses Fuji's coping mechanisms and skill as a detective by capturing a burglar suspect on the first day.
2	"Beginner's Luck"; Transliteration: "Bigināzu Rakku" (Japanese: ビギナーズ・ラック)	Park Jaeik	Ryunosuke Kingetsu	Yuzo Sato	January 12, 2022
2	"Police Jungle"; Transliteration: "Porisu Janguru" (Japanese: ポリス・ジャングル)	Park Jaeik	Ryunosuke Kingetsu	Yuzo Sato	January 12, 2022
3	"Enter the Ace"; Transliteration: "Ēsu Tōjō" (Japanese: エース登場)	Kang Taesik	Ryunosuke Kingetsu	Koji Sawai	January 19, 2022
3	"The Corpse's Tale"; Transliteration: "Itai wa Kataru" (Japanese: 遺体は語る)	Kang Taesik	Ryunosuke Kingetsu	Koji Sawai	January 19, 2022
4	"Dear Dog-Sama"; Transliteration: "Haikei Oinu-sama" (Japanese: 拝啓お犬様)	Kim Minsun	Ryunosuke Kingetsu	Yuzo Sato	January 26, 2022
4	"Runner's High"; Transliteration: "Rannāzu Hai" (Japanese: ランナーズ・ハイ)	Kim Minsun	Ryunosuke Kingetsu	Yuzo Sato	January 26, 2022
5	"Late-Night Patrol"; Transliteration: "Shin'ya no Patorōru" (Japanese: 深夜のパトロール)	Park Jaeik	Ryunosuke Kingetsu	Ken'ichi Kawamura	February 2, 2022
5	"Vs. the Groper"; Transliteration: "Bāsasu. Chikan" (Japanese: VS．チカン)	Park Jaeik	Ryunosuke Kingetsu	Ken'ichi Kawamura	February 2, 2022
6	"The Roaring Mixer"; Transliteration: "Gōkon Kyōsō Kyoku" (Japanese: 合コン狂騒曲)	Park Jaeik	Ryunosuke Kingetsu	Koji Sawai	February 9, 2022
6	"Runaway Police"; Transliteration: "Bōsō Porisu" (Japanese: 暴走ポリス)	Park Jaeik	Ryunosuke Kingetsu	Koji Sawai	February 9, 2022
7	"Tailing Championship"; Transliteration: "Bikō Senshuken" (Japanese: 尾行選手権)	Kang Taesik	Ryunosuke Kingetsu	Koji Sawai	February 16, 2022
7	"Smooth Talker"; Transliteration: "Hito Tarashi" (Japanese: 人たらし)	Kang Taesik	Ryunosuke Kingetsu	Koji Sawai	February 16, 2022
8	"Rampage of Justice"; Transliteration: "Seigi no Bōsō" (Japanese: 正義の暴走)	Park Sihu	Ryunosuke Kingetsu	Yoshiaki Kawajiri	February 23, 2022
8	"Musclehead"; Transliteration: "Kinniku Baka" (Japanese: 筋肉バカ)	Park Sihu	Ryunosuke Kingetsu	Yoshiaki Kawajiri	February 23, 2022
9	"Arrest Techniques"; Transliteration: "Taiho Jutsu" (逮捕術)	Park Sihu	Ryunosuke Kingetsu	Kyōsuke Takada	March 2, 2022
9	"UFO"	Park Sihu	Ryunosuke Kingetsu	Kyōsuke Takada	March 2, 2022
10	"Police ID"; Transliteration: "Keisatsu Techō" (Japanese: 警察手帳)	Kang Taesik	Ryunosuke Kingetsu	Koji Sawai	March 9, 2022
10	"Trauma"; Transliteration: "Torauma" (Japanese: トラウマ)	Kang Taesik	Ryunosuke Kingetsu	Koji Sawai	March 9, 2022
11	"Cannabis and Likeness"; Transliteration: "Taima to Nigaoe" (Japanese: 大麻と似顔絵)	Park Jaeik	Ryunosuke Kingetsu	Yoshiaki Kawajiri	March 16, 2022
11	"Sketch Artist Rhapsody"; Transliteration: "Nigaoe Kyōsō Roku" (Japanese: 似顔絵狂騒録)	Park Jaeik	Ryunosuke Kingetsu	Yoshiaki Kawajiri	March 16, 2022
12	"Reenactment Doll"; Transliteration: "Saigen Ningyō" (Japanese: 再現人形)	Park Sihoo	Ryunosuke Kingetsu	Yuzo Sato	March 23, 2022
12	"First Investigation Division"; Transliteration: "Sōsa Ikka" (Japanese: 捜査一課)	Park Sihoo	Ryunosuke Kingetsu	Yuzo Sato	March 23, 2022
13	"Decisive Moment"; Transliteration: "Shōbu wa Isshun" (Japanese: 勝負は一瞬)	Kim Minsun; Park Jaeik Sihoo	Ryunosuke Kingetsu	Yoshiaki Kawajiri	March 30, 2022
13	"Run Pawn Run"; Transliteration: "Koma yo Hashire" (Japanese: コマよ走れ)	Kim Minsun; Park Jaeik Sihoo	Ryunosuke Kingetsu	Yoshiaki Kawajiri	March 30, 2022

== Reception ==
By August 2021, Police in a Pod had over 2.3 million copies in circulation.

It was one of the Jury Recommended Works at the 22nd Japan Media Arts Festival in 2019. Police in a Pod won the Mandō Kobayashi Manga Grand Prix 2019, created by comedian and manga enthusiast Kendo Kobayashi. In 2021, along with Dead Dead Demon's Dededede Destruction, the series won the 66th Shogakukan Manga Award in the general category. The manga was nominated for the 45th Kodansha Manga Award in the general category in 2021; it won the 46th edition in the same category in 2022. The series ranked 23rd on the 2021 "Book of the Year" list by Da Vinci magazine; it ranked 13th on the 2022 list.
