= Riko Azuna =

Japanese singer and songwriter

Riko Azuna 安月名 莉子
- Born: December 3, 1993 (age 32); Japan
- Genres: J-pop; anison
- Occupations: Singer; songwriter; voice actress
- Instruments: Vocals; guitar
- Years active: 2018–present
- Labels: Kadokawa (2018–2023, 2026 – present); Flyingpan Record (2023–2026)
- Website: azuna-riko.com

Riko Azuna (安月名 莉子, Azuna Riko; born December 3, 1993) is a Japanese singer and songwriter who is affiliated with Kadokawa. She made her major debut in 2018 with the song "Kimi ni Furete" (君にふれて; "Touched By You"), which was used as the opening theme to the anime series Bloom Into You. Her music has also been featured in Re:Zero − Starting Life in Another World, Boogiepop and Others, Astra Lost in Space, Cautious Hero: The Hero Is Overpowered but Overly Cautious, Isekai Quartet, So I'm a Spider, So What?, Osamake: Romcom Where The Childhood Friend Won't Lose, Police in a Pod, Trapped in a Dating Sim: The World of Otome Games Is Tough for Mobs and Made in Abyss. She officially announced her debut as a voice actress on April 1, 2022, and signed a contract with EARLY WING agency. On April 3, 2024, it was announced that she left EARLY WING to join CAT entertainment.

== Career ==
Azuna was born on December 3, 1993. She had an interest in music and performing since her youth, and she participated in musicals from her second year of elementary to her third year of high school. While performing in musicals, she engaged in singing, dancing, and acting, but enjoyed singing the most out of the three. Because of this, she decided to focus on singing, and upon entering university, she began performing at various live venues in Tokyo.

Azuna's professional music career began after she first learned of an audition to perform a song for the anime television series Bloom Into You. At the time, she only knew that the series was about love between two girls, and only read the original manga series later. She passed the audition, and the resulting song "Kimi ni Furete" (君にふれて; "Touched By You"), which was used as the series' opening theme song, was released as her 1st single on November 28, 2018. She also performed the song "Memories", which was used as an insert song in the original video animation Re:Zero − Starting Life in Another World: Memory Snow.

Her 2nd single "Whiteout" was released on February 27, 2019; the title track was used as the ending theme song to the anime series Boogiepop and Others. Her 3rd single "Glow at the Velocity of Light" was released on August 21, 2019; the title track was used as the ending theme song to the anime series Astra Lost in Space. Her 4th single "be perfect, plz!" was released on November 6, 2019; the title track was used as the ending theme song to the anime series Cautious Hero: The Hero Is Overpowered but Overly Cautious.

Her 5th single "keep weaving your spider away" was released on January 27, 2021; the title track was used as the first opening theme song to the anime series So I'm a Spider, So What?. Her 6th single "Chance! & Revenge!" was released on April 28, 2021; the title track was used as the opening theme song to the anime series Osamake: Romcom Where The Childhood Friend Won't Lose. Her 7th single "Shiranakya" (知らなきゃ; "I Have to Know") was released on January 26, 2022; the title track was used as the opening theme song to the anime series Police in a Pod.

Her 8th single "selfish" was released on May 11, 2022; the title track was used as the ending theme song to the anime series Trapped in a Dating Sim: The World of Otome Games Is Tough for Mobs. Her 9th single "Katachi" (かたち; "Shape") was released on August 24, 2022; the title track was used as the opening theme song to the anime series Made in Abyss: The Golden City of the Scorching Sun, while its coupling track "Tomoshibi" (灯火; "Light") was used as the ending theme song to the video game Made in Abyss: Binary Star Falling into Darkness.

== Discography ==
=== Studio albums ===
Title	Album details	Peak chart positions		Sales
Title	Album details	JPN	JPN Hot	Sales
Blue Moon	Released: March 29, 2023; Label: Kadokawa; Formats: CD, download, streaming	141	—	
Emoria	Released: March 25, 2026; Label: Flyingpan Records; Formats: CD, download, streaming	—	—	
"—" denotes releases that did not chart.

=== Singles ===
Title	Year	Peak chart positions		Sales	Album
Title	Year	JPN	JPN Hot	Sales	Album
"Kimi ni Furete" (君にふれて; Feeling You)	2018	39	—		Blue Moon
"Whiteout"	2019	91	— (Note: "Whiteout" did not enter the Japan Hot 100 but peaked at number 95 on Download Songs chart.)		Blue Moon
"Glow at the Velocity of Light"	2019	79	— (Note: "Glow at the Velocity of Light" did not enter the Japan Hot 100 but peaked at number 34 on Download Songs chart.)		Blue Moon
"be perfect, plz!"	2019	128	—		Blue Moon
"keep weaving your spider way"	2021	56	— (Note: "keep weaving your spider way" did not enter the Japan Hot 100 but peaked at number 73 on Download Songs chart.)		Blue Moon
"Chance! & Revenge!"	2021	62	—		Blue Moon
"Shiranakya" (知らなきゃ; I Have to Know)	2022	83	— (Note: "Shiranakya" did not enter the Japan Hot 100 but peaked at number 98 on Download Songs chart.)		Blue Moon
"selfish"	2022	89	— (Note: "selfish" did not enter the Japan Hot 100 but peaked at number 84 on Download Songs chart.)		Blue Moon
"Katachi" (かたち; The Shape Of)	2022	30	66	JPN: 2,120 (phy.); JPN: 25,123 (dig.)	Blue Moon
"Azu is"	2023	—	—		Emoria
"Silver Floworld" (シルバーフラワールド)	2024	—	—		Emoria
"Horizon"	2025	—	—		Emoria
"Grasshopper / Ame Nochi Niji" (Grasshopper / 雨のち虹; Grasshopper / Rain then Rainbow)	2025	—	—		Emoria
"—" denotes releases that did not chart.

==== Digital singles ====
Title	Year	Peak chart positions		Sales (digital)	Album
Title	Year	JPN DS	JPN DL	Sales (digital)	Album
"Hana" (花, Flower)	2019	—	—		Blue Moon
"Horizon"	2024	—	—		Emoria
"Ame Nochi Niji" (雨のち虹, Rain then Rainbow)	2025	—	—		Emoria
"Grasshopper"	2025	—	—		Emoria
"Truly / Chill Choose!"	2026	—	—		Non-album single
"—" denotes releases that did not chart.

=== Other appearances ===
List of guest appearances that feature Riko Azuna
Title	Year	Album	Peak
Memories	2018	Re:Zero Kara Hajimeru Isekai Seikatsu OVA: Memory Snow OST by Kenichiro Suehiro	134
Snow Globe	2020	Kinetic Novel robot trilogy arrange "Jukemata"	—N/a
Via Lactea	2022	Over The Galaxy 2 Trilogy by Asami Imai, Riko Azuna, Jin Ogasawara	—N/a
Via Lactea	2022	Over The Galaxy Trilogy Union Song - ver. Al Di La with Asami Imai, Jin Ogasawara	—N/a
Via Lactea	2022	Over The Galaxy Trilogy Union Song - ver. Will go on with Asami Imai, Jin Ogasawara	—N/a
Dream to you... -original fu11 length-	2024	Apo11o program Rhythm Game Music Selection Vo.2 by Apo11o program	—N/a
Haruka	2025	Fure fure kimi no haru by Utahime Dream	—N/a
