= Shukusei!! Loli Kami Requiem =

2022 song by Shigure Ui

- Thumbnail for "Shukusei!! Loli Kami Requiem", featuring Niconico-style “barrage” comments and Ui holding her personal alarm

Song by Shigure Ui

from the album The Rain Doesn't Stop Yet
- Language: Japanese
- Released: May 25, 2022
- Genre: J-pop, EDM
- Length: 4:34
- Composer: D.watt (IOSYS)
- Lyricist: Maron (IOSYS)

Music video
- "Shukusei!! Loli Kami Requiem" on YouTube

"Shukusei!! Loli Kami Requiem" (Note: Japanese: 粛聖!! ロリ神レクイエム☆; Hepburn: Shukusei!! Rori Kami Rekuiemu; lit. 'Divine Purge! Requiem of the Loli God'; Shukusei means 'to purge' and is spelled ordinarily as 粛清; however, its use in the title is a Japanese wordplay, replacing the second kanji with 聖 sei ('holy' or 'divine').) is a song by Japanese artist Shigure Ui from her debut album The Rain Doesn't Stop Yet. (Note: Japanese: まだ雨はやまない; Hepburn: Mada Ame wa Yamanai) Featuring vocals by Shigure in her nine-year-old schoolgirl persona and narration by Tamaki Inuyama, it was composed by D.watt and written by Maron, both members of IOSYS. It is musically a denpa song, having lyrics that playfully and comedically mock lolicons in a scenario of power reversal, which is a common storytelling trope borrowed from the lolicon subgenre.

Though it was released in 2022, the song suddenly went viral in September 2023 after the release of its music video. Users on TikTok and other social media platforms posted their own dance videos and remixes. The song peaked at number 28 on the Billboard Japan Hot 100 and otherwise charted in Japan on Billboard Japan, Oricon, and Count Down TV. Authors note its catchy tune combined with the video as significant contributors to its popularity. Because of the severity of its lyrics, it also amassed controversy online.

== Composition ==
The lyrics to "Shukusei!! Loli Kami Requiem" are written from the perspective of Shigure Ui's fictional grade-schooler persona, nine-year-old Ui. She assails and taunts imprisoned child abusers while simultaneously acting as their goddess who will lead them to salvation. The music video visualizes these two factions: Ui sings and dances at the viewer in disgust, while danmaku 'barrage' comments inspired by video-sharing platform Nico Nico Douga scroll across the screen, representing the sexual predators (and her audience, which was the original playful target of her ridicule).

The song is considered a denpa 'nonsense' song with an electronic dance music tune to its track. Kitagawa of Kai-you divides the song into two main halves both separated by a middle section. The upbeat first half is described with pop music aspects that includes Ui's girlish singing and interjecting shouts, which then leads into a dubstep-like track to reveal Ui's hostile side towards pedophiles. Right in the middle part of the song, in an act of divine purging, the music cuts to her firing her Ui Beam to electrocute sludge creatures while the narrator explains the situation and the attack. Ultimately, the music descends into a dark second half that alternates between her hostile and girlish side.

== Production and release ==
The song features vocals from Japanese illustrator and virtual YouTuber (VTuber) Shigure Ui in her nine-year-old persona, dubbed "Loli Ui", who is featured occasionally in her livestreams. The song's lyrics and composition were written by Maron and D.watt, respectively, both of whom are members of dōjin 'indie' music group IOSYS. The song features a narration by fellow VTuber Tamaki Inuyama. In a 2022 interview with Febri, Shigure said that, as an otaku herself, she quickly decided on a denpa song when collaborating with IOSYS. Additionally, she said that the lyrics she had received were far more brutal compared to the final revision, calling it seemingly "as painful as hitting someone with concrete". According to Maron, the working title was "Shukusei: Butabakomyunikēshon!!". (Note: Japanese: 粛聖☆ブタバコミュニケーション!!; possibly a blend between butabako 'police cell' and komyunikēshon 'communication')

The song was previewed on May 21, 2022, in one of Shigure's livestreams on YouTube. (Note: Although Know Your Meme writes that the song was released as a single on May 21, 2022, Shigure's livestream on said date, (Note: Shigure, Ui (2022-05-21). みんなをしゅくせいするはいしん Archived October 5, 2023, at the Wayback Machine. Retrieved 2023-10-08 – via YouTube.) which was the first time it was made public, merely previewed snippets of it.) It was included in her debut album The Rain Doesn't Stop Yet, which was released on May 25. She performed it at her first live event in Tokyo on May 28. The music video for the song was released on September 10, 2023, on her YouTube channel, after she had performed it virtually in a livestream (Note: Shigure, Ui (2023-10-09). またあえたね！. Retrieved 2023-10-09 – via YouTube.) that revealed nine-year-old Ui's three-dimensional model. Illustrations thereof are credited to Shigure herself and animator Gagame, while the movie production is credited to Warabe Hōzuki.

== Reception ==
Upon its release, the song did not receive immediate notability and was supposedly overshadowed by the album's opening track, "Shinkakei Sketch". "Shukusei!! Loli Kami Requiem" came to be known by Shigure's fans as one of the "cute" songs on the album. However, after the release of its music video a year later, the song went viral worldwide on social media and became an Internet meme. This was unexpected for Shigure herself, who expressed that she hoped not to be perceived as a mesugaki to newcomers. The video reached 10 million views within three weeks, making it the fastest song by a VTuber to reach it. In June 2024, it passed 100 million views (Japanese: １億), the first VTuber original song to reach this milestone.

The dance featured during the song's chorus, which has been described as "of overwhelming quality", "brisk" and "hard to reproduce", helped amplify the sudden growth in popularity. Users on TikTok began posting videos of themselves or characters of their own or from video games, such as Genshin Impact, imitating the dance as an Internet challenge. Originality of such dance videos increases watch time and, thus, takes advantage of the recommendation algorithm. Gagame released template material of the video (Note: Gagame (2023-09-29). ロリ神_後記…_20230916rr_29 [Loli Kami afterword]. Archived from the original on 2023-10-28. Retrieved 2023-11-10 – via Pixiv Fanbox.) which also made apparent contributions to its popularity. Cover versions and remixes have also been posted online. By the end of September, it is estimated that over six thousand videos about the song had been posted on TikTok. Its popularity then spread to other platforms like YouTube Shorts and Twitter. It hit number one on the domestic Viral charts of Spotify on September 18. In what was originally a fan edit, the dance appeared in the Spotify background video of "9mm" by rap group Memphis Cult. BMW and Lotus Cars used the dance filter in their Instagram and TikTok advertisements respectively. The song has also appeared at a nightclub and department store. NHK declined to play the song on Buiāru!: VTuber no Ongaku Radio when a guest had requested it be played.

The Taiwanese Yahoo! News' MrSun called its lyrics and melody "really earwormy" such that "after letting someone hear it once, they will hum along subconsciously." Kitagawa praised the detailed structure and noted its unique rise in popularity as an intersection between music video and song. Writing for The Magazine of TuneCore Japan, Masahiro Saitou notes that, while popular among the youth, the music is also reminiscent of Japanese Internet culture during when Nico Nico Douga was the primary video-sharing platform in Japan. In a Real Sound analysis on 2000s Japanese Internet culture, Natsume Sogami echoes this assessment, who attributes it to the song's "easy-to-understand Nico Nico Douga-style comments" and being a work by IOSYS, who exerted influence on otaku culture at the time, in addition to having an idol-like call-and-response element.

=== Criticism ===
The song has amassed controversy due to its subject of pedophilia. The child safety alarm maker Artec came under fire on social media after it pointed out the alarm featured in the music video was based on one of their products and uploaded a video on YouTube and TikTok featuring one of their employees dancing to the song and prostrating in gratitude for featuring their product on September 29. The company posted an apology on their website on October 2 for their "extremely inappropriate behaviour that lacks consideration and self-awareness", then deleted their TikTok account. On October 3, Daisuke Yokoyama, the former actor for the children's television program Okaasan to Issho, deleted a video on TikTok of him performing the dance, after it had faced criticism on social media. Yokoyama apologized for it, saying he was unaware of the context behind the song in addition to it being trendy, and also deleted his account. A planned collaboration between Shigure Ui and the children's clothing brand Mezzo Piano raised controversy in September 2026 because of Shigure's association with the song. The collaboration was ultimately cancelled out of concern for the personal safety of those involved as they have had threats of violence directed towards them. Conversely, some VTuber fans claimed the song was "not a lolicon song".

=== Charts ===
Chart performance for "Shukusei!! Loli Kami Requiem"
Chart (2023)	Peak position
Download Songs (Billboard Japan)	18
Global Japan Songs excl. Japan (Billboard Japan)	19
Hot 100 (Billboard Japan)	25
Heatseekers Songs (Billboard Japan)	1
Japan Songs (South Korea; Billboard Japan)	9
TikTok Weekly Top 20 (Billboard Japan)	16
Top User Generated Songs (Billboard Japan)	1
Japan Digital Singles (Oricon)	35
Japan Streaming (Oricon)	38
Japan YouTube (Oricon)	3
Weekly Count Down TV (Tokyo Broadcasting System)	27
