= Osamake =

Japanese light novel series

- Osamake: Romcom Where The Childhood Friend Won't Lose
- First light novel volume cover featuring Sueharu Maru (left) and Kuroha Shida (right)

幼なじみが絶対に負けないラブコメ (Osananajimi ga Zettai ni Makenai Rabu Kome)
- Genre: Romantic comedy
- Light novel
- Written by: Shūichi Nimaru
- Illustrated by: Ui Shigure
- Published by: ASCII Media Works
- Imprint: Dengeki Bunko
- Original run: June 8, 2019 – February 7, 2025
- Volumes: 13
- Manga
- Written by: Shūichi Nimaru
- Illustrated by: Ryō Itō
- Published by: Media Factory
- Magazine: Monthly Comic Alive
- Original run: November 27, 2019 – May 27, 2024
- Volumes: 8
- Manga

Osananajimi ga Zettai ni Makenai Rabu Kome: Otonari no Yon-shimai ga Zettai ni Honobono suru Nichijō
- Written by: Shūichi Nimaru
- Illustrated by: Mutsumi Aoki
- Published by: Media Factory
- Magazine: Monthly Comic Alive
- Original run: January 27, 2021 – November 26, 2022
- Volumes: 3
- Anime television series
- Directed by: Takashi Naoya
- Produced by: Satoshi Motonaga; Aya Iizuka; Yuuichirou Kurokawa; Hajime Kamata; Soujirou Arimizu; Akihihiro Sotokawa; Yuuki Uchiyama; Takahiro Hibino
- Written by: Yoriko Tomita
- Music by: Akiyoshi Yasuda
- Studio: Doga Kobo
- Licensed by: Crunchyroll; SA/SEA: Muse Communication
- Original network: AT-X, SUN, Tokyo MX, KBS Kyoto, TV Aichi, BS11
- English network: SEA: Animax Asia
- Original run: April 14, 2021 – June 30, 2021
- Episodes: 12
- icon

Osamake: Romcom Where The Childhood Friend Won't Lose (幼なじみが絶対に負けないラブコメ, Osananajimi ga Zettai ni Makenai Rabu Kome; "A Romantic Comedy Where the Childhood Friend Absolutely Will Not Lose"), abbreviated as Osamake (おさまけ), is a Japanese romantic comedy light novel series written by Shūichi Nimaru and illustrated by Ui Shigure. A manga adaptation with art by Ryō Itō has been serialized in Media Factory's seinen manga magazine Monthly Comic Alive since November 2019. An anime television series adaptation by Doga Kobo aired from April to June 2021.

== Plot ==
Sueharu Maru is a seventeen-year-old high school boy who has never had a girlfriend. He lives next door to his childhood friend Kuroha Shida, a small and cute Onee-san type of girl with an outgoing character that frequently annoys him. One day, Kuroha confesses to Sueharu, but he immediately rejects her; Sueharu only has eyes for his first love, Shirokusa Kachi, who is a beautiful idol and an award-winning author in school. Shirokusa is indifferent to all boys in school but Sueharu, which makes Sueharu think that he might have a chance. When Sueharu decides to confess his feelings, he is devastated to find out that Shirokusa already has a boyfriend. Kuroha approaches Sueharu, offering to help him get revenge on Shirokusa and her boyfriend. Sueharu initially declines, wanting nothing to do with Kuroha, but eventually agrees to let her help him, thinking he might still have a chance with Shirokusa. However it turns out that Shirokusa also has feelings for Sueharu.

== Characters ==
=== Ultramarine Channel ===
Sueharu Maru (丸 末晴, Maru Sueharu)
Voiced by: Yoshitsugu Matsuoka
A former child actor. He is traumatized by his mother's death and quits acting at the peak of his fame, becoming a regular high school student at the beginning of the series. Despite his acting prowess, he is easy to read and does not know much about romance, making him highly susceptible to teasing by the opposite sex. He is constantly annoyed by Kuroha's antics and flirting, and immediately rejects her confession, but grows closer to her later on.
Kuroha Shida (志田 黒羽, Shida Kuroha)
Voiced by: Inori Minase
Sueharu's childhood friend and next-door neighbor. As the eldest of four sisters, she is caring and socially adept. She has loved him since their first meeting, though he has never returned her feelings. She desires his happiness but uses her deep understanding of him to manipulate situations for her own ends, which consistently provokes his antagonistic behavior toward her.
Shirokusa Kachi (可知 白草, Kachi Shirokusa)
Voiced by: Ayane Sakura
An award-winning novelist and Sueharu's first love. When Sueharu entered high school, he did not recognize her at first as she had a boyish appearance as a child. She is renowned as a "cool beauty" at school due to her fame, demeanor, intelligence, and looks. Despite being cold and aloof toward most of her male classmates, she acts friendly around Sueharu after he praises her writing.
Maria Momosaka (桃坂 真理愛, Momosaka Maria)
Voiced by: Saori Ōnishi
A famous actress known for starring in the hit drama The Ideal Little Sister. Sueharu was assigned to be her mentor when he was a child actor, through which they developed a sibling-like relationship. She idolizes Sueharu and yearns for him to return to acting.
Tetsuhiko Kai (甲斐 哲彦, Kai Tetsuhiko)
Voiced by: Nobunaga Shimazaki
Sueharu's close friend. He enjoys watching Sueharu react to various events and often orchestrates things behind the scenes.

=== Supporting characters ===
Mitsuru Abe (阿部 充, Abe Mitsuru)
Voiced by: Takuma Terashima
Shirokusa's fake boyfriend. He is a big fan of Sueharu when Sueharu was the child actor.
Meiko Mine (峰 芽衣子, Mine Meiko)
Voiced by: M.A.O
Shirokusa's close friend.
Soichiro Kachi (可知 総一郎, Kachi Soichiro)
Voiced by: Tetsu Inada
Shirokusa's father.
Rena Asagi (浅黄 玲菜, Asagi Rena)
Voiced by: Tomoyo Takayanagi
A kouhai in Sueharu's school.
Midori Shida (志田 碧, Shida Midori)
Voiced by: Akane Fujita
Kuroha's next younger sister. She is the tallest in four sisters of Shida family.
Aoi Shida (志田 蒼依, Shida Aoi)
Voiced by: Miyuri Shimabukuro
Kuroha's second younger sister, Akane's elder twin sister.
Akane Shida (志田 朱音, Shida Akane)
Voiced by: Natsumi Hioka
Kuroha's youngest sister, Aoi's younger twin sister.
Shion Ōragi (大良儀 紫苑, Ōragi Shion)
Voiced by: Kaede Hondo
Shirokusa's maid who has lived with her family for years. Because of this, she and Shirokusa have a sister-like relationship. She is also classmates with Sueharu.
Shun Hardy (ハーディ・瞬, Hādi Shun)
Voiced by: Wataru Takagi
Eri Momosaka (桃坂 絵里, Momosaka Eri)
Voiced by: Minami Takahashi

== Production ==
The names of the characters are references to characters in Fire Emblem: for instance, Maru, Shida, Kachi, Kai and Maria are named after Marth, Sheeda, Catria, Cain and Maria respectively. The names of the female characters include colors: for instance, Kuroha (lit. "black feather/wing"), Shirokusa (lit. "white grass"), Momosaka (lit. "pink slope/hill"), Asagi (lit. "pale/shallow yellow"), Midori (lit. "green"), Aoi (lit. "blue-i"), Akane (lit. "red sound") and Shion (lit. "purple garden").

== Media ==
=== Light novels ===
Written by Shūichi Nimaru and illustrated by Ui Shigure, Osamake was published by ASCII Media Works, under its Dengeki Bunko, in thirteen volumes, released from June 8, 2019, to February 7, 2025.

No.	Japanese release date	Japanese ISBN
1	June 8, 2019	978-4-04-912524-5
2	October 10, 2019	978-4-04-912852-9
3	February 7, 2020	978-4-04-912899-4
4	June 10, 2020	978-4-04-913213-7
5	October 10, 2020	978-4-04-913371-4
6	February 22, 2021	978-4-04-913496-4; 978-4-04-913497-1 (SE)
7	April 9, 2021	978-4-04-913736-1
8	June 10, 2021	978-4-04-913737-8
9	February 10, 2022	978-4-04-913902-0
10	October 7, 2022	978-4-04-914227-3
11	June 9, 2023	978-4-04-914808-4
12	March 8, 2024	978-4-04-915133-6
13	February 7, 2025	978-4-04-915704-8

=== Manga ===
A manga adaptation by Ryō Itō began serialization in Media Factory's Monthly Comic Alive in November 2019, with six tankōbon volumes were published so far.

No.	Japanese release date	Japanese ISBN
1	May 23, 2020	978-4-04-064697-8
2	February 22, 2021	978-4-04-680003-9; 978-4-04-680004-6 (SE)
3	April 23, 2021	978-4-04-680385-6
4	November 22, 2021	978-4-04-680870-7
5	October 21, 2022	978-4-04-681769-3
6	March 23, 2023	978-4-04-682247-5
7	November 22, 2023	978-4-04-682747-0
8	August 23, 2024	978-4-04-683639-7

A spin-off manga series illustrated by Mutsumi Aoki titled Osananajimi ga Zettai ni Makenai Love Come: Otonari no Yon-shimai ga Zettai ni Honobono suru Nichijō ("Daily Lives Where the Four-Sister Neighbour Absolutely Will Make You Warm") began serialization in Media Factory's Monthly Comic Alive on January 27, 2021. Three tankōbon volumes have been published so far.

No.	Japanese release date	Japanese ISBN
1	May 21, 2021	978-4-04-680386-3
2	February 22, 2022	978-4-04-680869-1
3	March 23, 2023	978-4-04-682248-2

=== Anime ===
An anime television series adaptation was announced on October 3, 2020. The series was animated by Doga Kobo and directed by Takashi Naoya, with Yoriko Tomita handling series' composition. Naoya also designed the characters. It aired from April 14 to June 30, 2021, on AT-X and other channels. Riko Azuna performed the series' opening theme song "Chance! & Revenge!", while Inori Minase and Ayane Sakura performed the series' ending theme song "Senryakuteki de Yosō Funō na Love Comedy no Ending Tema Kyoku" (lit. "An Ending Theme Song for a Tactically Unpredictable Romantic Comedy"). Crunchyroll streamed the series outside of Asia. Muse Communication has licensed the series in Southeast Asia and South Asia, and will stream it on their Muse Asia YouTube channel and Bilibili. The series ran for 12 episodes.

==== Episodes ====
No.	Title (Note: All English titles are taken from Crunchyroll.)	Directed by	Written by	Original release date
1	"Romcom Where The Childhood Friend Won't Lose"; Transliteration: "Osananajimi ga Zettai ni Makenai Rabu Kome" (Japanese: 幼なじみが絶対に負けないラブコメ)	Matsuo Asami	Yoriko Tomita	April 14, 2021
Sueharu Maru develops an infatuation with his classmate, the school idol and award-winning novelist Shirokusa Kachi, and forms a friendship with her. His childhood friend, the other school idol Kuroha Shida, had previously confessed her feelings to him, but he rejected her due to his devotion to Kachi. After overhearing a rumor that Kachi is in a relationship with Mitsuru Abe, Maru falls into a deep depression. Shida seizes this opportunity to propose a scheme: they will begin a fake relationship to make Kachi jealous and upstage her alleged romance. Shida's true motive is to use this pretense to get closer to Maru and win his affection, though her efforts consistently backfire as he finds her behavior creepy and annoying, repeatedly clarifies he has no feelings for her, and actively avoids her. While Maru attempts to uncover compromising information on Abe, his investigation fails and culminates in a confrontation where Abe reveals he knows about Maru's past as a child actor.
2	"His and Her and Her Circumstances"; Transliteration: "Kare to Kanojo to Kanojo no Jijō" (Japanese: 彼と彼女と彼女の事情)	Sung Min Kim	Yoriko Tomita	April 21, 2021
Abe reveals that Maru's childhood acting career inspired his own and that his relationship with Kachi is a calculated ploy for revenge after learning of Maru's affection for her; he plans to formally confess to her at the upcoming school festival. In response, Maru resolves to upstage Abe by convincing his class to perform a play for the festival, and he persuades Kachi to write it. During rehearsals, Maru hyperventilates and loses consciousness. He awakens to Kachi, who knows his former identity as an actor, watching over him. He confesses that he quit acting due to trauma after his mother died in an on-set accident, which led to the show's hiatus. Kachi later reflects and unveils that she and Maru were childhood friends—she was known as "Shiro" and her father was Maru's co-star. It was Maru who originally encouraged her to write. After the show was cancelled and they were separated, she devoted herself to becoming a great writer out of bitterness toward him for leaving, revealing that he, too, is her first love.
3	"I Have Achieved My Revenge on My First Love"; Transliteration: "Ga, Hatsukoi Fukushū Kanryō su" (Japanese: 我、初恋復讐完了す)	Akane Ōzora; Takashi Naoya	Yoriko Tomita	April 28, 2021
At the festival, Kachi visits Maru disguised as her childhood persona "Shiro" and is moved that he remembers his promise to act in her work. Revealing herself, she admits her jealousy over his proximity to Shida and encourages him to be more open. After she leaves, Shida confronts her and both declare their pursuit of Maru. He and Shida walk the grounds, where she ends their fake relationship to free him. Maru upstages Abe's musical confession to Kachi during the closing ceremony. Instead of confessing to Kachi, he admits his initial revenge plan and, realizing Shida's constant support, confesses to her. Shida surprisingly rejects him. Later, it is revealed Abe was Kachi's fake boyfriend in her failed scheme to win Maru, and that Shida's rejection was her own act of petty revenge. All parties are left disappointed. Elsewhere, an unknown girl recognizes Maru from a video of his performance.
4	"Momosaka Maria Strikes"; Transliteration: "Momosaka Maria Shūrai" (Japanese: 桃坂真理愛襲来)	Yoshiyuki Shirahata	Ayumu Hisao	May 5, 2021
Maru remains distressed over his failed confession, a sentiment shared by Kachi and Shida. His frustration increases when his friend Kai uploads the video of his festival performance and confession, making it go viral. His situation is further complicated by the arrival of Maria Momosaka, a popular actress whom he once mentored; her enthusiastic return irritates both Kachi and Shida. Kai also introduces Rena Asagi, a helpful first-year student and an old friend. Kachi appears to ask Maru out, though her friend Meiko Mine clarifies that her father, Maru's former co-star, wishes to see him. When a still-traumatized Shida reappears, Maru hides behind Kachi, causing Shida to leave in tears. Both Maru and Shida receive separate counsel from Kai as they contemplate their feelings. Maru returns home to find Momosaka has made dinner; she reveals their former agency, under new management, wants to recruit both him and Shida back into acting. Suddenly, Shida's siblings arrive and announce that Shida has developed amnesia.
5	"The Girl Who Lost Her Memories"; Transliteration: "Kioku Kakeru Shōjo" (Japanese: 記憶カケル少女)	Matsuo Asami	Ayumu Hisao	May 12, 2021
5	"The Octopus Wiener Trap"; Transliteration: "Tako-san Uinnā no Wana" (Japanese: タコさんウインナーの罠)	Matsuo Asami	Ayumu Hisao	May 12, 2021
Following Momosaka's departure, Shida's sisters claim her amnesia has erased all memories since her initial confession to Maru. Though hesitant after their history, he resolves to assist her, and she expresses a desire to rebuild their trust. Kachi arrives, suspects Shida is feigning amnesia due to her jealousy, and Maru devises a test. At lunch, he serves her a bento containing octopus wieners, a food tied to a past traumatic incident, which she eats without reaction. During a discussion about Maru potentially returning to acting, Kachi and Kai interrupt with their own input; Kai proposes starting a video production club with Kachi writing scripts and urges Maru to join. To consider the offer, Maru visits the agency accompanied by Shida, Kachi, Kai, and Momosaka. The president, Shun Hardy, presents a lucrative offer exceeding one hundred million dollars. Shida declines, and when Hardy insults her over this refusal, Maru retaliates by pouring a bottle of wine over him.
6	"The One Who Laughs Last"; Transliteration: "Saigo ni Warau Mono" (Japanese: 最後に笑う者)	Matsuo Asami	Seiko Takagi	May 19, 2021
After Hardy threatens legal action, a compromise is brokered by Kachi's father and Momosaka: a competition wherein both the agency and Maru's group, the Ultramarine Alliance, will produce a commercial for a pharmaceutical company. If the Alliance wins, they gain creative freedom; if they lose, Maru must join the agency. Momosaka stars in the agency's commercial to demonstrate her growth. The Ultramarine Alliance ultimately wins, and Maru commits to the group. It is then revealed that Shun Hardy is Kai's father, and that Kai founded the Alliance and befriended Maru solely to exact revenge. Momosaka, having escaped her agency contract, transfers into Maru's class, irritating Shida and Kachi. Later, Maru catches Shida in a lie, confirming she fabricated her amnesia.
7	"I Know! Let's Go to Okinawa!"; Transliteration: "Sō da, Okinawa e Ikō!" (Japanese: そうだ、沖縄へ行こう！)	Sung Min Kim	Yoriko Tomita	May 26, 2021
A confrontation erupts between Maru and Shida over her fabricated amnesia, with Maru frustrated by his inability to comprehend her motives. Concurrently, Kachi conspires with Kai to advance her position in their romantic rivalry. The Ultramarine Alliance boys propose a summer trip to Okinawa to create "memories", a plan the girls reluctantly accept after dismissing the idea of filming in swimsuits. Shida joins the group a day later due to prior obligations watching her sisters. That evening, Aoi visits Maru and cautions him about the "magic of travel" and the potential for impulsive romantic entanglements. In a separate conversation, Kai reveals to Kachi that Rena is his half-sister, a relationship she wishes to keep secret. The group, now including Momosaka's sister Eri, prepares for the trip as Kachi and Momosaka engage in a heated argument over their culinary skills, culminating in a planned cooking competition.
8	"Shirokusa's Counterattack"; Transliteration: "Gyakushū no Shirokusa" (Japanese: 逆襲の白草)	Matsuo Asami	Seiko Takagi	June 2, 2021
Kachi becomes dejected as the group decides on a hot pot competition, a dish she struggles with, having wanted to prepare Maru's favorite food, fried chicken. After overhearing Maru and Kai discuss his conflicted feelings for her and Shida, Momosaka begins plotting her own approach. The group arrives at Kachi's family villa and begins to relax. Shida internally struggles to suppress her jealousy, imagining the other girls growing closer to Maru. He later receives a text from Kachi summoning him to a secluded part of the beach, where she seductively models her swimsuit. The rest of the group intervenes before the situation escalates. Later, while practicing a dance routine, Kachi encounters difficulties. That night, she returns dejectedly to the beach, where Maru comforts her as she shares her anxieties. They nearly kiss before Maru recalls Aoi's warning and pulls away. The next morning, Maru is awakened by Shida and her sisters.
9	"Paradise SOS"; Transliteration: "Paradaisu Esu Ō Esu" (Japanese: パラダイスSOS)	Shōgo Arai	Ayumu Hisao	June 9, 2021
Maru and Shida maintain their antagonistic dynamic until she confronts him, refusing to apologize but instead proactively declaring "I love you" throughout the day, leaving him persistently flustered. During a study session, Maru recognizes the extra effort Shida invested in his assignments and begins to appreciate her dedication. While preparing the stage for a performance, Akane voices her confusion over seeing Maru with multiple girls. That night, Maru finds Kachi practicing her dance despite a sprained ankle and offers his encouragement. Akane secretly observes them, and Aoi discerns that her sister is developing feelings for Maru—something she has been trying to suppress to avoid emotional pain. The performance the next day is successful, though Maru breaks his arm saving Kachi from a fall off the stage. Back at school, Abe and Kai discuss the situation, with Kai surmising that Kachi is currently in the lead as she fits Maru's preferred type. Maru then learns that Kachi and her maid are moving in to care for him during his recovery, much to Shida's discomfort.
10	"The Girls' Secret Discussion"; Transliteration: "Otome-tachi no Mitsudan" (Japanese: 乙女たちの密談)	Matsuo Asami; Sung Min Kim	Yoriko Tomita	June 16, 2021
Shida and Momosaka are denied permission by their parents to stay overnight at Maru's residence alongside Kachi. Aoi and Akane also begin distancing themselves from Maru, much to his disappointment. As everyone departs, Kachi declares to Shida her intention to use this opportunity to grow closer to Maru. Meanwhile, Kachi's maid, Shion Oragi, informs Maru that Shida's actions stem from a "sense of respect" and he should not misinterpret her motives. Momosaka begins school, spending all her free time openly flirting with Maru, inciting jealousy among the boys and annoyance from Kachi. During lunch, Kachi feeds him, adding to his confusion based on Oragi's earlier remarks. He later talks with Shida on the roof, where they begin to reconcile. Kai informs the Ultramarine Alliance of an offer to produce a documentary about Maru's life since leaving acting. Though hesitant, Shida is persuaded when Kai asks Maru if he seeks closure on his own terms. They compromise by having the Alliance produce the documentary themselves, which will include Maru filming a new version of the final scene from his former series, Child King—a proposal he accepts. Later, the girls meet to establish boundaries against openly flirting with Maru while simultaneously scheming to use the documentary as a way to get closer to him.
11	"Come and Catch the Me from That Day"; Transliteration: "Ano Hi no Watashi o Tsukamaete" (Japanese: あの日のわたしをつかまえて)	Sung Min Kim	Ayumu Hisao	June 23, 2021
The group discovers tabloids are publishing stories about Maru's past, which Kai attributes to Shun Hardy. Undeterred, they proceed with their documentary and the refilming of the true ending for Child King, now backed by Collect Japan TV. Momosaka proposes that each girl interview Maru due to their connections to his history. Kachi begins, inviting him to her home where they reminisce about their childhood friendship and how he helped her overcome nervousness; their session concludes with a date to Tokyo Tower. The next day, Momosaka takes him to the location where his mother died, intending to help him reconcile with the trauma and position herself as his support. As Maru describes his profound loneliness following the tragedy, Momosaka breaks down, overwhelmed by her own love for his mother and regret over harsh words she once said to him. This emotional exchange finally allows Maru to cry as the two share a comforting embrace.
12	"Childhood Girlfriend"; Transliteration: "Osa Kano" (Japanese: おさかの)	Takashi Naoya	Yoriko Tomita	June 30, 2021
Following Momosaka's continued pursuit of Maru, Kai announces that due to the retirement of the original Child King cast, Shida and Kachi will join Maru and Momosaka in filming the true ending. Walking home together, Shida reflects on her history with Maru and the moment she began falling for him. She leads him to an old hiding spot from their childhood, where they reminisce over shared memories. Shida confesses her love once more and admits her previous rejection was an act of revenge for his initial refusal—a honesty Maru appreciates. When she asks for his response, however, he hesitates, his feelings for Kachi and Momosaka still unresolved. Sensing his conflict, Shida withdraws her demand and instead proposes becoming his "childhood girlfriend", a flexible promise allowing them to remain close while leaving future possibilities open. After the documentary's release, Abe visits Kai and exposes all the girls' scheming, including Shida's strategy, concluding that Kai has ultimately "won". Maru later discovers a school fan club formed in his honor, leaving him bashful as the girls resolve not to let these admirers interfere.

== Reception ==
The light novel ranked fifth in 2020 in Takarajimasha's annual light novel guide book Kono Light Novel ga Sugoi!, in the bunkobon category.
