= IOSYS =

Japanese musical ensemble

- Type: Yūgen gaisha
- Industry: Digital media
- Genre: Denpa song • Shibuya-kei
- Founded: October 10, 1998; Sapporo, Japan
- Headquarters: Sapporo, Japan
- Products: CDs
- Website: iosysos.com

IOSYS (イオシス, ioshisu) is a Japanese musical ensemble and doujin circle from Sapporo, Japan. The group is primarily known for producing rearrangements of music from the Touhou Project series of shoot 'em up video games. They are not signed to a label, instead preferring to release their music through dōjin channels such as the Comiket convention and via their website. Their music frequently parodies characters or themes of games such as those of the Touhou Project or Atlus's Etrian Odyssey.

== Works ==
IOSYS is best known for the Flash movies that go along with their songs.

The first Flash movie was a music video for their original song "Farewell 2005 (逝ってよし2005, Itte Yoshi 2005)" sang 2channelculture, and was published in April 2006. It was created by a dōjin animation producer Kagi (カギ), also known as locker room production. IOSYS offered Kagi to create animations for them after being impressed by Kagi's animation entitled "NANAME City".

In May 2006, IOSYS released the first Touhou Project arrangement CD,Tōhō Kazakuraen (東方風櫻宴). ARM, a main composer of IOSYS, recalled that he was interested in dojin music circles competed with each other for arrangements of the same original music. He was inspired by the Touhou Project arrangement song "Help me, EIRINNNNNN!!" created by the dōjin circle COOL&CREATE in 2004.

In August 2006, IOSYS released the second Touhou Project arrangement CD, Tōhō Otomebayashi (東方乙女囃子). In November 2006, they published a promotional video using the second track of the CD, "Marisa Stole the Precious Thing (魔理沙は大変なものを盗んでいきました, Marisa wa Taihen na Mono wo Nusundeikimashita)", which quickly became the ensemble's most iconic arrangement, and whose movie was made by Kagi. It had a positive critical reception from visitors. Flash movies were followed by "Stops at the Affected Area and Immediately Dissolves ~ Lunatic Udongein (患部で止まってすぐ溶ける ～ 狂気の優曇華院, Kanbu de Tomatte Sugu Tokeru ~ Kyōki no Udongein)" (known in English speaking circles as "Overdrive") from their third Touhou Project arrangement album, "Rabbi-Tewi (ウサテイ, Usatei)" co-worked with COOL&CREATE, and "Cirno’s Perfect Math Class (チルノのパーフェクトさんすう教室, Chiruno no Paafekuto Sansuu Kyoushitsu)". Their Flash movies and fan-made videos were often uploaded to video streaming sites such as Nico Nico Douga and YouTube without permission from the animator or IOSYS. They caused a large sensation among the Japanese Internet forum 2channel, Nico Nico Douga and in other otaku internet circles.

IOSYS also produced the second ending credits for Penguin Musume Heart and composed opening and ending credits music for Yumekui Merry. Couple of weeks later, they collaborated with the Virtual YouTuber Shigure Ui for a special track called "Shukusei! Loli Kami Requiem", which gained popularity in Japan via TikTok and YouTube.

On August 21st 2024, McDonald's Japan, in collaboration with IOSYS and Team Shanghai Alice, released a parody advert of "Marisa Stole the Precious Thing" featuring new vocals by miko and new visuals by Kagi.

== Members ==
=== Music creators ===
- ARM - Composer and lyricist. Founding member.
- Yoshimi Youno (夕野ヨシミ, Yōno Yoshimi) - Lyricist and graphics designer. Founder of the IOSYS doujin circle.
- D.watt a.k.a. Lettuce Shichijou (七条レタス, Shichijō Retasu) - Lyricist, composer, and DJ. Early member.
- Yuya Kobayashi (コバヤシユウヤ, Kobayashi Yūya) a.k.a. void - Composer and arranger. Joined in 2007.
- uno a.k.a. RoughSketch - Composer and DJ. Joined in July 2010.
- Maron (まろん) - Composer, lyricist, and DJ. Joined in 2016.
- john=hive - Composer, lyricist, and bassist.
- Katahotori (かたほとり) - Composer and lyricist.

=== Other members ===
- Takuya (たくや)
- Hakase (はかせ)
- Momiji Yamamoto (山本椛, Yamamoto Momiji)
- Misa (未早)
- Aikorin (あいこりん)
- Chiyoko (ちよこ)
- Ayu (あゆ)
- quim
- MOC
- GIGYO
- Ja-mane (ジャーマネ) a.k.a. Arima.Y
- Tsukatsuka (ツカツカ)
- tsZ
- Kazutoku (かずとく)
- iTOK
- Asami Kakka (アサミ閣下)
