= Shigure Ui =

Japanese illustrator and VTuber

- しぐれうい
- Ui Shigure's VTuber persona
- Born: Yokkaichi, Japan
- Occupations: Illustrator; manga artist; musician; virtual YouTuber

YouTube information
- Channel: しぐれうい
- Years active: 2019–present
- Genres: Livestreaming; Chatting; Let's Play; Drawing
- Subscribers: 2.28 million
- Views: 517 million
- Last updated: 29 May 2026

Shigure Ui (しぐれうい) is a Japanese illustrator, manga artist, light novel character designer, musician and VTuber.

== Career ==
Shigure was born in Yokkaichi, Mie Prefecture, Japan. She is an art graduate.

After working in a game development company, she began working as a freelance illustrator.

In August 2018, she started designing the appearance for Hololive Production's Virtual YouTuber Oozora Subaru, who debuted in September the same year. Since then, she occasionally appears as a guest on Hololive member livestreams, particularly with Subaru and Miko. In May 2019, she began livestreaming as a virtual YouTuber, where she livestreams herself chatting to the audience, illustrating and playing video games.

Shigure's 2022 song—"Shukusei!! Loli Kami Requiem", which was included in her debut solo album, The Rain Doesn't Stop Yet—went viral online in September 2023 after the release of its music video. She has expressed her surprise at the sudden growth of her song and subsequently her channel.

== Personal life ==
Shigure has said that from a young age, her mother influenced her to start drawing. She also cites Arina Tanemura, Noizi Ito and Cocoa Fujiwara as major influences on her work.

== Notable work ==
=== Book illustrations ===
==== Standalone ====
- Fushishisha to Ansatsusha no Desu Gēmu (不死者と暗殺者のデスゲーム製作活動) (Written by Kaede Asamiya, published by Dengeki Bunko, ISBN 9784048939188)
- Kanojo no L ~Usotsukitachi no Kōbōsen~ (彼女のL〜嘘つきたちの攻防戦〜) (Written by Chie Sanda, published by Famitsu Bunko, ISBN 9784047352308)
- JK Anken Suishinchyū!! ~Torihikisaki no Youkyū de Ojōsama Joshikō no Ryō ni Sumikomu ni Natta~ (JK案件推進中!! 〜取引先の要求でお嬢様女子校の寮に住み込むことになった〜) (Written by Kazuki Fujimiya, published by Kadokawa Sneaker Bunko, ISBN 9784041074664)
- Kūru Bisho Kei Senpai ga Ie ni Tomatteike to Otomari o Yōkyūshitekimashita…… (クール美女系先輩が家に泊まっていけとお泊まりを要求してきました......) (Written by Kano Shikihara, published by Earth Star Novels, ISBN 9784803012910)
- 101 Mētoru Hanareta Koi (101メートル離れた恋) (Written by Rei Komatsu, published by Kodansha Light Novel Bunko, ISBN 9784065164747)
- Tensai Shōjo A to Kokuhakusuru Noberugēmu (天才少女Aと告白するノベルゲーム) (Written by Chie Sanda, published by Famitsu Bunko, ISBN 9784047358935)

==== Series ====
- Aoiro Noizu to <Yakimochi> Kirāchūn Wakeari JK to Hajimeru Dansō V Kei Bando (青色ノイズと〈やきもち〉キラーチューン ワケありJKと始める男装V系バンド) (Written by Mukai Sōya, published by MF Bunko J)
- Osamake (幼なじみが絶対に負けないラブコメ) (Written by Shūichi Nimaru, published by Dengeki Bunko)
- Kimi wa Boku no Kōkai (Written by Shimesaba, published by Dash X Bunko)

=== Anime ===
- BBK/BRNK The Gentle Giants of the Galaxy (Ep. 10, opening card illustrator)
- Rascal Does Not Dream of Bunny Girl Senpai (Anime adaptation announcement picture illustrator)
- PROJECT MAPLUS Pure Mon no Monster (Yoshiki Machida, character designer)
- WIXOSS DIVA (A) LIVE (Character designer)
- Osamake (2021 anime, original illustrator, voice-cameo)

=== Manga ===
- Kankitsu Panchi! (かんきつパンチ!) (Published by Manga Time Kirara Miracle!, Houbunsha)

=== Art collections ===
- Ame ni Kou (雨に恋う) (Published by Kenkōsha)

=== Character design ===
- Oozora Subaru (Hololive Production Virtual YouTuber, character designer)
- Shijimi Matsueshinjiko (Onsen Musume, character designer)
- Sendo Yuuhi (Virtual eSports Project Virtual YouTuber, character designer)

=== Other ===
- WIXOSS Trading Card Game (Card illustrator)

== Discography ==
=== Collaborative albums ===
Release date	Title	SKU number	Tracks	Peak chart positions
Release date	Title	SKU number	Tracks	JPN Hot
24 March 2021	SPOTLIGHT vol.1	SNCL-42	D1M09: メランコリック／しぐれうい; D2M07: 奏（かなで）／カグラナナ×しぐれうい	—
25 January 2022	SPOTLIGHT Vol.2	SNCL-59	D1M02:「夕立のりぼん」／しぐれうい; D2M07:「Fantastic future」／潤羽るしあ×しぐれうい	17

=== Solo albums ===
Release date	Title	SKU number	Tracks	Peak chart positions		
Release date	Title	SKU number	Tracks	JPN	JPN Comb.	JPN Hot
25 May 2022	まだ雨はやまない - The rain doesn't stop yet.	SNCL-66	Track listing M-01: シンカケイスケッチ; M-02: もうそう♡えくすぷれす; M-03: 放課後マーメイド; M-04: 寝・逃・げでリセット! M-05: インドア系ならトラックメイカー; M-06: 粛聖!!ロリ神レクイエム☆ M-07: ルル; M-08: 夕立のりぼん; M-09: 花ざかりWeekend✿ M-10: プラチナジェット; M-11: rainy lady M-12: Pris-Magic! M-13: シンカケイスケッチ (Instrumental); M-14: 放課後マーメイド (Instrumental); M-15: 粛聖!!ロリ神レクイエム☆ (Instrumental); M-16: rainy lady (Instrumental); M-17: Pris-Magic! (Instrumental)	9	9	11
11 September 2024	fiction	UPCH-20678	Track listing: 1. ハッピーヒプノシズム; 2. うい麦畑でつかまえて; 3. ひっひっふー; 4. 微炭酸SWIMMER; 5. Paint it delight!; 6. 二人模様; 7. ういこうせん; 8. あいしてやまない; 9. 勝手に生きましょ	11	13	10

== Appearances ==
- Numa ni Hamattekiitemita (5 April 2021, NHK Educational TV)
