= Spiral (Longman song) =

2023 single by Longman

Single by Longman
- Released: August 30, 2023
- Recorded: 2023
- Genre: J-pop; anime song
- Label: Sony Music Records
- Composer: Hiroya Hirai
- Lyricist: Hiroya Hirai

Alternative cover
- Limited anime edition cover

"spiral" is the third single by Longman. It was released on August 30, 2023, and peaked at #40 on the Oricon single chart. The song primarily serves as the opening theme from the second season of the anime series Mushoku Tensei. It was re-released on October 4, 2023, as part of "10/4" alongside other themes from Longman.

Inspired by Rudeus Greyrat's return to his journey but alone as shown at the end of the first season, lyric writer Hiroya Hirai aimed to expressed Rudeus' shut-in behaviour through the lyrics and show an inspirational message. The song was influenced by Sum 41 and Travis Barker with the staff also practising English in order to perform an alternate version. "Spiral" was the subject positive response by anime fans, often appearing in the polls where it was voted as one of the best anime songs of the season. Streams were also notable, surpassing 4.5 million views online.

== Origin and reception ==
The theme song was first revealed in May 2023, promoting the second season of the anime series Mushoku Tensei. According to Real Sound, the song became highly popular reaching over 4.5 million streams. Longman re-released it in the jacket and contents of their 2nd major full-length album "10/4", which was released on October 4, 2023. The DVD that comes with the first limited edition includes the music videos for the album's songs as well as a making-of video. It has also been played 5.51 million times on the music streaming service Spotify as of September 29, 2023.

Animehunch describes the opening sequence of Mushoku Tensei as a visual narrative from Rudeus's perspective, eloquently portraying his yearning to be united with his beloved. This sentiment is portrayed through the graceful entwining of hands, a poignant depiction of his longing. The counterpart figure, however, remains blank, symbolizing the yet unfulfilled search. This sequence portrays Rudeus revisiting his past adventures, as he steadily moves forward. A transformative sequence follows up on this, as we see Rudeus ascend a spiral staircase. This is a metaphor for his evolving self. This staircase signifies his active role in shaping destinies, showcasing his growth. Overall, this opening captures Rudeus' profound yearning, personal evolution, and the exciting journey that lies ahead. The song won "Favorite Opening Theme Song" in the "Summer 2023 Anime Awards" from Anime Trending

In a survey conducted by AnimeAnime "Which song do you like the theme song of summer 2023 anime? OP anime version", it was ranked 7th, and ranked 3rd in male votes only. It was ranked 4th in the theme song ranking of Anime Corner. Daiichi Kosho Co., Ltd. conducted a karaoke ranking survey of TV anime theme songs for summer anime works scheduled for July 2023 on online karaoke DAM. "Spiral" took third place.

== Production ==
Hiroya Hirai, who was in charge of the music, said that he imagined the scene depicted in the climax of the 23rd episode of the first season, in which Rudeus Greyrat stands up and walks away after being abandoned by Eris, and created the song so that it could flow there. He was influenced by the previous themes composed by Yuiko Ōhara in the first season. After composing the song, the band received a call from Ohara herself who was surprised by "Spiral". At first Hirai was thinking of submitting two songs, but in the end he ended up creating six songs, brushing up on three of them, narrowing it down to two, and submitting it. That is why he chose "spiral." Hirai was on tour and had a tight schedule while making this, but it was exciting for him. It was a period where the band were able to produce such good songs that even the five songs that were rejected made us wish we could release them in a different form. Besides the feelings of Rudeus, Hirai wanted to generalize hikikomori and relate to them through the lyrics. Some phrases like "The map I drew" were based on his own worldview.

Hirai wanted to do something different from what he done before, so he decided to make it a concept album. Machine Gun Kelly started doing punk rock in 2020, and because he comes from hip-hop, he used hip-hop rhythms and synchronized things. When he heard that, he realized that even punk rock can still do new things. From then on, we started incorporating more and more synchronization. Also, regarding the key of the vocals, up until then both Sawa and he had been singing in a relatively high key, but started using his male voice to sing in a lower key. Anyway, I got into a mode where I wanted to do more and more things that I hadn't done before. The intro guitar phrase is an homage to the intro phrase of Sum 41's "Heart Attack".

While "spiral" is one thing, he thinks this album as a whole was quite a turning point. Up until then, the group had thought that drums were something that was behind the scenes, something that didn't really come to the fore. But while he was in the hospital, he learned the drums of Travis Barker, and thought that influence is evident in this album. Travis Barker's drumming is the type of drummer who goes out front in terms of sound, which fascinated him and influenced the style of "spiral". He feels like he is able to play the drums more "live-like" than before at live shows. I think it helped me come out of my shell. It is not "spiral", the drum sounds are completely different depending on the song. In that sense, I think the expressions have become even richer. Horihori recorded the instruments after recording the vocals, so he was able to record the drums along with the actual vocals for the first time. That is why he belivese the performance became even more expressive. Sawa suffered a broken bone, the recording schedule had to be changed drastically. The original plan was to record 8 songs in 3 months, but the schedule ended up recording 8 drum songs in 2 days. They recorded the vocals in Tokyo, but this time we recorded them in Ehime by themselves. Thanks to that, the group was able to show more expressions than before. Their pronunciation was also thoroughly investigated. It was extremely difficult, but the band is glad with what they did. While recording, they changed the singing parts.

== Content ==
- 1. "spiral"
- 2. "Don't kill my vibe"
- 3. "spiral (TV size)"
- 4. "spiral (English Short Ver.)"
- Catalog Number: AICL-4413/4
- Lyrics: Hiroya Hirai
- Compositions: Hiroya Hirai
- Arrangement: TBA

== Charts ==
Weekly chart performance for "Spiral"
Chart (2023)	Peak position
Japan (Oricon)	40
Japan Download Songs (Billboard Japan)	25
