= List of Mushoku Tensei episodes =

Key visual for the series

Mushoku Tensei: Jobless Reincarnation is a Japanese anime television series based on Rifujin na Magonote's light novel series of the same title. The series follows a jobless and hopeless man who dies after having a sad and reclusive life and reincarnates in a fantasy world while keeping his memories, determined to enjoy his second chance at life without regrets as Rudeus Greyrat.

The first season was directed by Manabu Okamoto and animated by Studio Bind, with Kazutaka Sugiyama designing the characters, and Yoshiaki Fujisawa composing the music. Egg Firm is credited for production. The series was originally scheduled to premiere in 2020, but was delayed to January 2021. The first part aired from January 11 to March 22, 2021, on Tokyo MX, KBS, BS11, and SUN. (Note: Tokyo MX listed the series premiere as January 10, 2021, at 24:00, which is effectively January 11 at midnight JST) The second part was originally set to premiere in July 2021, but was delayed to October 2021. The second part aired from October 4 to December 20, 2021. (Note: Tokyo MX listed the second part premiere as October 3, 2021, at 24:00, which is effectively October 4 at midnight JST) The season ran for 23 episodes. Toho Animation released both parts of the first season on Blu-ray across 4 volumes, with the first volume releasing in April 2021. The season's fourth Blu-ray volume was released in March 2022 and included a bonus original video animation (OVA) episode.

Funimation licensed the series and streamed it on its website in North America, Mexico, Brazil and the British Isles, in parts of Europe, Central Asia and North Africa through Wakanim, and in Australia and New Zealand through AnimeLab. The series also streamed on Hulu in the United States. On February 13, 2021, Funimation announced the series would be receiving an English dub, with the first episode premiering the next day. Following Sony's acquisition of Crunchyroll, the series was moved to Crunchyroll. Crunchyroll released the first 11 episodes on DVD and Blu-ray in North America on December 5, 2022, with the latter 12 episodes a well as the unaired episode being released by the company on March 7, 2023. Crunchyroll also released the first season across two Blu-ray volumes in the United Kingdom and across two Blu-ray and DVD volumes in Australia.

Muse Communication has licensed the series in Southeast Asia and South Asia and streamed it on their Muse Asia YouTube channel and its respective regional variants, and on iQIYI, Bilibili and WeTV in Southeast Asia, Netflix in South Asia and Southeast Asia, Catchplay in Indonesia and Singapore, meWatch in Singapore, and Sushiroll in Indonesia.

In March 2022, it was announced that a second season had been green-lit. The season was directed by Hiroki Hirano, with scripts supervised by Toshiya Ono, and character designs handled by Sanae Shimada. The second season consisted of 25 episodes (Note: Number count total includes "Episode 0") and aired in two split season cours. The first part aired from July 3 to September 25, 2023. (Note: Tokyo MX listed the season premiere as July 2, 2023, at 24:00, which is effectively July 3 at midnight JST) The second part aired from April 8 to July 1, 2024. (Note: Tokyo MX lists the second part premiere as April 7, 2024, at 24:00, which is effectively April 8 at midnight JST) The second season was collected into a total of four Blu-ray volumes in Japan between October 2023 and September 2024.

A third season was announced following the airing of the second season's final episode. The first part aired with its first two episodes from July 4 to September 28, 2026. The second part is set to premiere in 2027.

== Series overview ==
Season	Episodes		Originally released	
Season	Episodes		First released	Last released
1	23	11	January 11, 2021	March 22, 2021
1	23	12	October 4, 2021	December 20, 2021
2	25	13	July 3, 2023	September 25, 2023
2	25	12	April 8, 2024	July 1, 2024
3	TBA	14	July 4, 2026	September 28, 2026
3	TBA	TBA	2027	TBA

== Episodes ==
=== Season 1 (2021) ===
No. overall	No. in season	Title	Directed by (Note: Production staff information is taken from the ending credits of each episode.)	Written by	Chief animation directed by	Original release date
Part 1
1	1	"Jobless Reincarnation"; Transliteration: "Mushoku Tensei" (Japanese: 無職転生)	Directed by : Hiroki Hirano; Storyboarded by : Manabu Okamoto	Manabu Okamoto	Kazutaka Sugiyama	January 11, 2021 (Note: Episodes 1 and 2 were pre-screened on December 27, 2020.)
2	2	"Master"; Transliteration: "Shishō" (Japanese: 師匠)	Directed by : Hiroki Hirano; Storyboarded by : Manabu Okamoto & Hiroki Hirano	Manabu Okamoto	Yoshiko Saitō	January 18, 2021
3	3	"A Friend"; Transliteration: "Tomodachi" (Japanese: 友達)	Directed by : Chiaki Ōji; Storyboarded by : Manabu Okamoto & Chiaki Ōji	Hiroki Hirano	Yoshiko Saitō	January 25, 2021
4	4	"Emergency Family Meeting"; Transliteration: "Kinkyū Kazoku Kaigi" (Japanese: 緊急家族会議)	Directed by : Nao Miyoshi & Asahi Oka; Storyboarded by : Hiroki Hirano	Manabu Okamoto	Toshimitsu Kobayashi, Masaru Yoshioka, Atsushi Aono, Taeko Ōgi & Yukiyo Komito (Note: De facto via animation director credits)	February 1, 2021
5	5	"A Young Lady and Violence"; Transliteration: "Ojōsama to Bōryoku" (Japanese: お嬢様と暴力)	Hiroyuki Takashima	Manabu Okamoto	Yoshiko Saitō	February 8, 2021
6	6	"A Day Off in Roa"; Transliteration: "Roa no Kyūjitsu" (Japanese: ロアの休日)	Directed by : Mihiro Yamaguchi, Takahiro Tamano, Ōri Yasukawa & Hiroki Hirano; Storyboarded by : Kazuya Aiura	Hiroki Hirano	Miyachi	February 15, 2021
7	7	"What Lies Beyond Effort"; Transliteration: "Doryoku no Saki ni Aru Mono" (Japanese: 努力の先にあるもの)	Katsuya Shigehara	Manabu Okamoto & Hirohisa Saitō	Yoshiko Saitō	February 22, 2021
8	8	"Turning Point 1"; Transliteration: "Tāningu Pointo Ichi" (Japanese: ターニングポイント１)	Tenpei Mishio	Manabu Okamoto & Hirohisa Saitō	Mizuki Takahashi	March 1, 2021
9	9	"A Chance Encounter"; Transliteration: "Kaikō" (Japanese: 邂逅)	Directed by : Takahiro Tamano & Hiroki Hirano; Storyboarded by : Atsushi Kobayashi	Hiroki Hirano	Miyako Nishida	March 8, 2021
10	10	"The Value of a Life and the First Job"; Transliteration: "Hito no Inochi to Hatsu Shigoto" (Japanese: 人の命と初仕事)	Directed by : Hiroki Hirano & Ōri Yasukawa; Storyboarded by : Shizutaka Sugawara & Hiroki Hirano	Manabu Okamoto & Hirohisa Saitō	Miyachi & Yoshiko Saitō	March 15, 2021
11	11	"Children and Warriors"; Transliteration: "Kodomo to Senshi" (Japanese: 子供と戦士)	Shingo Fujii	Muneo Nakamoto	Mizuki Takahashi	March 22, 2021
Part 2
12	12	"The Woman with the Demon Eyes"; Transliteration: "Magan o Motsu Onna" (Japanese: 魔眼を持つ女)	Directed by : Fumiaki Kataoka; Storyboarded by : Atsushi Kobayashi	Kōhei Urushibara	Mizuki Takahashi & Miyachi	October 4, 2021
13	13	"Missed Connections"; Transliteration: "Surechigai" (Japanese: すれ違い)	Directed by : Yoshitsugu Kimura; Storyboarded by : Hiroki Hirano	Atsushi Takayama	Yoshiko Saitō & Mizuki Takahashi	October 11, 2021
14	14	"No Such Thing As a Free Lunch"; Transliteration: "Tada yori Takai Mono wa Nai" (Japanese: 只より高いものはない)	Yoshinobu Tokumoto	Hirohisa Saitō, Kōhei Urushibara & Manabu Okamoto	Yoshiko Saitō	October 18, 2021
15	15	"Slow Life in the Doldia Village"; Transliteration: "Dorudia Mura no Surō Raifu" (Japanese: ドルディア村のスローライフ)	Katsuya Shigehara	Hirohisa Saitō, Kōhei Urushibara & Manabu Okamoto	Mizuki Takahashi	October 25, 2021
16	16	"Family Squabble"; Transliteration: "Oyako Genka" (Japanese: 親子げんか)	Directed by : Michiru Itabisashi; Storyboarded by : Yoshinobu Tokumoto & Tatsuyuki Nagai	Kōhei Urushibara	Miyachi	November 1, 2021
17	17	"Reunion"; Transliteration: "Saikai" (Japanese: 再会)	Directed by : Hiroyuki Takashima; Storyboarded by : Tatsuyuki Nagai	Muneo Nakamoto	Yoshiko Saitō	November 8, 2021
18	18	"Separate Journeys"; Transliteration: "Sorezore no Tabi" (Japanese: それぞれの旅)	Directed by : Chihiro Kumano; Storyboarded by : Taichi Yumemi	Atsushi Takayama	Mizuki Takahashi	November 15, 2021
19	19	"Route Selection"; Transliteration: "Rūto Sentaku" (Japanese: ルート選択)	Yoshinobu Tokumoto	Shigekazu Kondō & Manabu Okamoto	Yoshiko Saitō	November 22, 2021
20	20	"The Birth of My Little Sister, the Maid"; Transliteration: "Imōto Jijo no Umareta Hi" (Japanese: 妹侍女の生まれた日)	Katsuya Shigehara	Shigekazu Kondō & Manabu Okamoto	Kō Aine & Mizuki Takahashi	November 29, 2021
21	21	"Turning Point 2"; Transliteration: "Tāningu Pointo Ni" (Japanese: ターニングポイント２)	Hiroyuki Takashima	Shigekazu Kondō & Manabu Okamoto	Yoshiko Saitō	December 6, 2021
22	22	"Dreams and Reality"; Transliteration: "Genjitsu (Yume)" (Japanese: 現実(ユメ) (Note: The Ruby text in this case is used to provide a subtitle rather than serve as Japanese phonology.))	Directed by : Kai Hasako; Storyboarded by : Hiroki Hirano	Atsushi Takayama	Nanako Ninomiya	December 13, 2021
23	23	"Wake Up and Take a Step"; Transliteration: "Mezame, Ippo," (Japanese: 目覚め、一歩、)	Directed by : Chihiro Kumano; Storyboarded by : Manabu Okamoto	Muneo Nakamoto & Rifujin na Magonote	Yoshiko Saitō, Hiroyuki Saita & Mizuki Takahashi	December 20, 2021

=== Season 2 (2023–2024) ===
No. overall	No. in season	Title	Directed by	Written by	Chief animation directed by	Original release date
Part 1
24	0	"Guardian Fitz"; Transliteration: "Shugo Jutsushi Fittsu" (Japanese: 守護術師フィッツ)	Directed by : Hakaribito Ketsuzuki; Storyboarded by : Hiroki Hirano, Yukihiro Komawo & Makoto Hirasawa	Toshiya Ono	Aya Tanaka	July 3, 2023
25	1	"The Brokenhearted Mage"; Transliteration: "Shitsui no Majutsushi" (Japanese: 失意の魔術師)	Directed by : Ayumu Uwano; Storyboarded by : Hiroki Hirano	Toshiya Ono	Aya Tanaka	July 10, 2023
26	2	"The Forest in the Dead of Night"; Transliteration: "Mayonaka no Mori" (Japanese: 真夜中の森)	Nobuyoshi Arai	Kōhei Urushibara	Hong Zhi Sun	July 17, 2023
27	3	"Abrupt Approach"; Transliteration: "Kyūsekkin" (Japanese: 急接近)	Directed by : Sayaka Tsuji; Storyboarded by : Mie Ōishi	Atsushi Takayama	Aya Tanaka	July 24, 2023
28	4	"Letter of Invitation"; Transliteration: "Suisenjō" (Japanese: 推薦状)	Directed by : Yoshitsugu Kimura; Storyboarded by : Ayako Kōno	Toshiya Ono	Kazuhiro Ōta	July 31, 2023
29	5	"Ranoa University of Magic"; Transliteration: "Ranoa Mahō Daigaku" (Japanese: ラノア魔法大学)	Komari Kamikita	Kōhei Urushibara	Hong Zhi Sun	August 7, 2023
30	6	"I Don't Want to Die"; Transliteration: "Shinitakunai" (Japanese: 死にたくない)	Ayumu Uwano	Atsushi Takayama	Aya Tanaka	August 14, 2023
31	7	"The Kidnapping and Confinement of Beast Girls"; Transliteration: "Kemonozoku Reijō Rachikankin Jiken" (Japanese: 獣族令嬢拉致監禁事件)	Ryōsuke Shibuya	Toshiya Ono	Takuma Yamasaki, Kōta Sera, Nanako Ninomiya, Shinobu Isoko & Shunryo Yamamura	August 21, 2023
32	8	"The Fiancé of Despair"; Transliteration: "Zetsubō no Konyakusha" (Japanese: 絶望の婚約者)	Directed by : Yasuhiko Akiyama; Storyboarded by : Tomohiko Itō	Kōhei Urushibara	Yūki Miyagi & Jia Li	August 28, 2023
33	9	"The White Mask"; Transliteration: "Shiroi Kamen" (Japanese: 白い仮面)	Directed by : Kento Shintani; Storyboarded by : Hiroki Hirano	Atsushi Takayama	Aya Tanaka	September 4, 2023
34	10	"These Feelings"; Transliteration: "Kono Kimochi" (Japanese: この気持ち)	Takahiro Hirata	Toshiya Ono	Hong Zhi Sun	September 11, 2023
35	11	"To You"; Transliteration: "Anata e" (Japanese: あなたへ)	Directed by : Sayaka Tsuji; Storyboarded by : Komari Kamikita	Atsushi Takayama	Aya Tanaka	September 18, 2023
36	12	"I Want to Tell You"; Transliteration: "Tsutaetai" (Japanese: 伝えたい)	Directed by : Yoshitsugu Kimura & Tomoaki Takatsudo; Storyboarded by : Ryōsuke Shibuya	Toshiya Ono	Hong Zhi Sun	September 25, 2023
Part 2
37	13	"My Dream Home"; Transliteration: "Yume no Mai Hōmu" (Japanese: 夢のマイホーム)	Directed by : Takashi Mizuzono; Storyboarded by : Ayumu Uwano	Kōhei Urushibara	Shinobu Ikakko	April 8, 2024
38	14	"Wedding Reception"; Transliteration: "Hirōen" (Japanese: 披露宴)	Directed by : Yui Kanbe; Storyboarded by : Tomohiko Itō	Atsushi Takayama	Hong Zhi Sun	April 15, 2024
39	15	"Afar"; Transliteration: "Haruka" (Japanese: 遥か)	Directed by : Tomoaki Takatsudo; Storyboarded by : Shinsaku Sasaki	Toshiya Ono	Hong Zhi Sun	April 22, 2024
40	16	"Norn and Aisha"; Transliteration: "Norun to Aisha" (Japanese: ノルンとアイシャ)	Directed by : Sayaka Tsuji; Storyboarded by : Tomohiko Itō	Kōhei Urushibara	Kōta Sera	April 29, 2024
41	17	"My Older Brother's Feelings"; Transliteration: "Aniki no Kimochi" (Japanese: 兄貴の気持ち)	Directed by : Yui Kanbe; Storyboarded by : Tomohiko Itō	Naoto Taniuchi	Kōta Sera	May 6, 2024
42	18	"Turning Point 3"; Transliteration: "Tāningu Pointo San" (Japanese: ターニングポイント3)	Directed by : Sayaka Tsuji; Storyboarded by : Tomohiko Itō	Toshiya Ono	Shinobu Ikakko	May 13, 2024
43	19	"Desert Journey"; Transliteration: "Sabaku no Tabi" (Japanese: 砂漠の旅)	Tomoaki Takatsudo	Kōhei Urushibara	Hong Zhi Sun	May 27, 2024
44	20	"Into the Labyrinth"; Transliteration: "Meikyūiri" (Japanese: 迷宮入り)	Directed by : Hiroki Nagashima & Masami Kashimama; Storyboarded by : Ayumu Uwano	Atsushi Takayama	Kōta Sera	June 3, 2024
45	21	"Magic Circles of the Sixth Stratum"; Transliteration: "Dai Roku Kaisō no Mahō-jin" (Japanese: 第六階層の魔法陣)	Directed by : Sayaka Tsuji & Ryōsuke Shibuya; Storyboarded by : Akira Nishimori & Yasuaki Fujii	Atsushi Takayama	Kōta Sera & Hong Zhi Sun	June 10, 2024
46	22	"Parents"; Transliteration: "Oya" (Japanese: 親)	Directed by : Q Kawa & Yasuhiko Akiyama; Storyboarded by : Hiroshi Shirai	Kōhei Urushibara	Shinobu Ikakko	June 17, 2024
47	23	"Let's Go Home"; Transliteration: "Kaerou" (Japanese: 帰ろう)	Directed by : Oreki Jōgorō; Storyboarded by : Tōru Harumizu	Kōhei Urushibara	Hong Zhi Sun	June 24, 2024
48	24	"Succession"; Transliteration: "Tsugu" (Japanese: 嗣ぐ)	Directed by : Tomoaki Takatsudo, Hiroki Nagashima & Ryōsuke Shibuya; Storyboarded by : Mie Ōishi	Naoto Taniuchi	Kōta Sera & Hong Zhi Sun	July 1, 2024

=== Season 3 (2026) ===
No. overall	No. in season	Title	Directed by	Written by	Chief animation directed by	Original release date
49	1	"Burn Bright, Mad Dog"; Transliteration: "Moeyo Kyōken" (Japanese: 燃えよ狂犬)	Directed by : Shōgo Katō; Storyboarded by : Ryōsuke Shibuya	Atsushi Takayama	Keiya Nakano & Satoshi Shimada	July 4, 2026
50	2	"Howl, Mad Dog"; Transliteration: "Hoeyo Kyōken" (Japanese: 吠えよ狂犬)	Directed by : Akari Ranzaki; Storyboarded by : Akari Ranzaki & Ryōsuke Shibuya	Atsushi Takayama & Rifujin na Magonote	Kazuhiro Ōta (Note: This episode contains no chief animation director credit, making those credited under "animation director" chief by default.)	July 4, 2026
51	3	"Life Back at Home"; Transliteration: "Kaettekita Nichijō" (Japanese: 帰ってきた日常)	Directed by : Ryō Ishimaru; Storyboarded by : Yasuhiko Akiyama	Kōhei Urushibara	Satoshi Shimada	July 13, 2026
52	4	"A King-Class Water Mage"; Transliteration: "Mizuōkyū Majutsushi" (Japanese: 水王級魔術師)	Hiroki Nagashima	Naoto Taniuchi	Ikuma Fujibe	July 20, 2026
53	5	"Celebrations"; Transliteration: "Oiwai" (Japanese: お祝い)	Directed by : Yuki Tateno; Storyboarded by : Tomohiko Itō	Kōhei Urushibara	Haruka Katsutani & Shunryō Yamamura	July 27, 2026
54	6	"Another Domestic Disaster?"; Transliteration: "Shuraba Futatabi?" (Japanese: 修羅場再び？)	Directed by : Keito Hoshi; Storyboarded by : Mie Ōishi	Naoto Taniuchi	Keiya Nakano	August 3, 2026
55	7	"Phase Four"; Transliteration: "Dai Yon Dankai" (Japanese: 第四段階)	Directed by : Shōgo Katō; Storyboarded by : Yuri Pinzon	Atsushi Takayama	Ikuma Fujibe	August 10, 2026
56	8	"The Flying Fortress"; Transliteration: "Kūchū Jōsai" (Japanese: 空中城塞)	Directed by : Ryō Ishimaru; Storyboarded by : Shōgo Kōmoto & Ryōsuke Shibuya	Kōhei Urushibara	Shunryō Yamamura	August 17, 2026
57	9	"Lament"; Transliteration: "Dōkoku" (Japanese: 慟哭)	Directed by : Satoru Yamashita; Storyboarded by : Shinji Itadaki	Naoto Taniuchi	Satoshi Shimada	August 24, 2026
58	10	"An Audience with an Immortal Demon King"; Transliteration: "Fushi Maō to no Ekken" (Japanese: 不死魔王との謁見)	Directed by : Hiroki Nagashima; Storyboarded by : Hiroki Nagashima, Yasuhiko Akiyama & Ryōsuke Shibuya	Atsushi Takayama	Ikuma Fujibe	August 31, 2026
59	11	"Turning Point 4"; Transliteration: "Tāningu Pointo Yon" (Japanese: ターニングポイント4)	Directed by : Keito Hoshi; Storyboarded by : Keiichiro Kawaguchi	Kōhei Urushibara	Satoshi Shimada	September 7, 2026
60	12	"An End and a Beginning"; Transliteration: "Owari to Hajimari" (Japanese: 終わりと始まり)	Directed by : Shōgo Katō; Storyboarded by : Tomohiko Itō & Ryōsuke Shibuya	Naoto Taniuchi	Keiya Nakano	September 14, 2026
61	13	"The Diary"; Transliteration: "Nikki" (Japanese: 日記)	Directed by : Ryō Ishimaru, Mizuki Sakuma, Ruvu Ōshima & Ryōsuke Shibuya; Storyboarded by : Tomohiko Itō, Shinji Itadaki & Ryōsuke Shibuya	Ryōsuke Shibuya	Ikuma Fujibe	September 21, 2026
62	14	"Resolve"; Transliteration: "Kakugo" (Japanese: 覚悟)	Directed by : Satoru Yamashita & Hiroki Nagashima; Storyboarded by : Ryōsuke Shibuya & Ayumu Uwano	Atsushi Takayama	Ikuma Fujibe, Satoshi Shimada, Jia Li & Keiya Nakano	September 28, 2026

== OVA ==
No.	Title	Directed by	Written by	Chief animation directed by	Original release date
1	"Eris the Goblin Slayer"; Transliteration: "Erisu no Goburin Tōbatsu" (Japanese: エリスのゴブリン討伐)	Directed by : Fumiaki Kataoka, Yoshinobu Tokumoto & Kai Hasako; Storyboarded by : Fumiaki Kataoka & Katsuya Shigehara	Shigekazu Kondō & Manabu Okamoto	Kō Aine & Yoshiko Saitō	March 16, 2022
Eris decides to take on a goblin slaying quest and witnesses a boastful young mage named Cliff Grimoire getting into trouble. Eris saves him, but when he calls her ugly, she beats him up. Eris reluctantly agrees to form a party with Cliff when he asks but is furious when Cliff burns the goblins to ashes, leaving no evidence of the completion of the quest. They soon get lost in the forest. Witnessing assassins attacking a little girl and her guard Therese, Eris kills the assassins and claims to Therese she is Ruijerd the Superd. As they leave, one of the surviving assassins recognizes Cliff as Master Cliff and wonders why he is with a Temple Knight. Ruijerd interrogates the assassin before he dies and learns they are allies of the Pope, who supports co-existence between humans and demons, whereas the Temple Knights and their leader, the Archbishop, do not. As they return to town, Cliff asks Eris to marry him, claiming he must be more impressive than Rudeus, but when he sees Eris's face while she thinks about Rudeus, he realizes he stands no chance against her feelings for Rudeus and goes home depressed where it is revealed the dead assassins were actually his tutors. Eris returns to Rudeus and finds him upset after his fight with Paul. Cliff sits in his room, thinking about Rudeus. Note: This OVA takes place during episode 16 of the series, titled "Family Squabble," but follows Eris instead of Rudeus.
