= Mushoku Tensei (TV series) =

Japanese anime television series

- Mushoku Tensei: Jobless Reincarnation
- 無職転生 〜異世界行ったら本気だす〜 Mushoku Tensei: Isekai Ittara Honki Dasu
- Type: Television series
- Genre: Fantasy; Harem; Isekai
- Based on: Mushoku Tensei
- Created by: Rifujin na Magonote (story); Shirotaka (art)
- Directed by: Manabu Okamoto (S1); Hiroki Hirano (S2P1); Ryōsuke Shibuya (S2P2–S3)
- Series composition: Manabu Okamoto (S1); Toshiya Ōno (S2); Ryōsuke Shibuya (S3); Naoto Taniuchi (S3)
- Character designers: Kazutaka Sugiyama (S1); Mizuki Takahashi (S1P2); Yoshiko Saitou (S2); Sanae Shimada (S2–S3); Ryouta Furukawa (S3)
- Music by: Yoshiaki Fujisawa
- Voices of: Yumi Uchiyama; Konomi Kohara; Ai Kayano; Ai Kakuma; Toshiyuki Morikawa; Hisako Kanemoto
- Country of origin: Japan
- Original language: Japanese
- No. of seasons: 3
- No. of episodes: 62 + OVA (list of episodes)

Production
- Art director: Masakazu Miyake (Note: Various other art directors worked on Season 1 episodically.)
- Sound director: Jin Aketagawa
- Cinematographer: Shinji Tonsho
- Color designer: Makiko Doi
- Editor: Akinori Mishima
- Animation producers: Toshiya Ootomo (S1, S2P2–S3); Kouji Yoneda (S2P1)
- Studio: Studio Bind
- Producers: List: Takahiro Yamanaka; Ryōsuke Imai; Tomoyuki Ōwada; Shōji Ōsuga; Takurō Hatakeyama; Takumi Morii (S1); Sōkichi Onoda (S1P1); Kouki Hishiyama (S1P2–S2P1, S3); Sō Yurugi (S2); Takao Iwata (S2P2); Keiichi Takizawa (S3)
- Production companies: Mushoku Tensei Production Committee: Hakuhodo DY M&P; Toho; Kadokawa; Frontier Works; Nippon BS Broadcasting; Gree; Egg Firm
- Runtime: 23 minutes

Original release
- Networks: Tokyo MX, KBS, BS11
- Release: January 11, 2021 – present

Mushoku Tensei: Jobless Reincarnation (Note: Japanese: 無職転生 〜異世界行ったら本気だす〜, Hepburn: Mushoku Tensei: Isekai Ittara Honki Dasu; lit. 'Jobless Reincarnation: If (I) Go to Another World, (I) Will Make a Serious Effort') is a Japanese anime television series produced by Studio Bind based on the light novel series Mushoku Tensei, written by Rifujin na Magonote (Note: Japanese: 理不尽な孫の手; lit. 'Unreasonable Backscratcher') and illustrated by Shirotaka. The series is notable for being the primary reason for the formation of Studio Bind, a joint venture between White Fox and Egg Firm, specifically to ensure a high-quality, long-term adaptation of the source material.

The series follows a 34-year-old shut-in who dies while saving a teenager, and is reincarnated in a world of sword and sorcery as Rudeus Greyrat. Retaining his memories, he resolves to live his new life to the fullest without regrets.

== Plot ==
=== Season 1 ===
Rudeus begins his life in the village of Buena, training in magic under the tutelage of Roxy Migurdia and befriending Sylphiette. Rudeus is sent to the city of Roa to tutor his distant cousin, Eris Boreas Greyrat. He begins teaching her magic and literacy while learning combat from Ghislaine Dedoldia. A massive mana disaster teleports Rudeus and Eris to the Demon Continent. They team up with the "Dead End" warrior Ruijerd Superdia to begin a multi-year journey back to the Central Continent. After crossing the sea and navigating the Millis Continent, Rudeus briefly reunites with his father, Paul, leading to a breakdown and eventual reconciliation regarding the fate of their family.

=== Season 2 ===
A depressed, teenage Rudeus travels northern lands as an adventurer, searching for his mother Zenith while gaining fame under the moniker "Quagmire." Rudeus enrolls in the Ranoa Magic Academy to investigate the mana incident. He encounters a masked "Silent Sevenstar" and reunites with a disguised Sylphiette. Following his marriage to Sylphiette, the story focuses on domestic life, building a home, and the arrival of his sisters, Norn and Aisha. Rudeus receives a distress signal from Paul regarding Zenith. He travels to the Begaritt Continent to enter the Teleportation Labyrinth, culminating in a tragic battle against a Mana Hydra.

=== Season 3 ===
Rudeus lives happily with his family after taking Roxy as his second wife, until he has an encounter with an alternate, future version of him, who warns Rudeus about an impending crisis that will lead to the destruction of everybody he cares for. Thus he begins taking measures to avoid this tragic fate.

== Series overview ==
| Season | Episodes | | Originally released | |
| Season | Episodes | | First released | Last released |
|---|---|---|---|---|
| 1 | 23 | 11 | January 11, 2021 | March 22, 2021 |
| 1 | 23 | 12 | October 4, 2021 | December 20, 2021 |
| 2 | 25 (Note: Number count total includes "Episode 0") | 13 | July 3, 2023 | September 25, 2023 |
| 2 | 25 | 12 | April 8, 2024 | July 1, 2024 |
| 3 | TBA | 14 | July 4, 2026 | September 28, 2026 |
| 3 | TBA | TBA | 2027 | TBA |

== Production ==
Director Manabu Okamoto found the novel both controversial and first-rate. This made him interested in adapting it into an anime. However, the length of the novels made it difficult. The biggest challenge was Rudeus's constant growth from a toddler to a teenager in the first story arcs, which the staff made subtle rather than using time-skips. To characterize Rudeus properly, his character was given the two voice actors of Tomokazu Sugita for his thoughts and Yumi Uchiyama for his dialogue. The composer Yoshiaki Fujisawa wanted modern background themes to fit the classic fantasy world.

For the second season, Hiroki Hirano replaced Okamoto as director. He said he aims to develop Rudeus again from a low point, as the first season ends with Rudeus falling into depression after losing all his allies. He hopes he and the development staff will address the character growth. Producer Nobuhiro Osawa expressed uncertainty on whether the team would include more side stories from the original series to help develop Rudeus.

== Release ==
In March 2019, the official website of MF Books announced that an anime adaptation of Mushoku Tensei would be produced. The anime was later announced on October 18, 2019, to be a television series directed by Manabu Okamoto and animated by Studio Bind, with Kazutaka Sugiyama designing the characters and Yoshiaki Fujisawa composing the music. Egg Firm is credited for production. The series was originally scheduled to premiere in 2020, but was delayed until January 2021. The first half aired from January 11 to March 22, 2021, on Tokyo MX, KBS, BS11, and SUN. (Note: Tokyo MX lists the series premiere at 24:00 on January 10, 2021, which is effectively 12:00 a.m. JST on January 11.) A second half was announced after the first half of the series on March 22, 2021. The second half was set to premiere in July 2021 but was delayed to October 2021. The second half aired from October 4 to December 20, 2021. (Note: Tokyo MX lists the second half premiere at 24:00 on October 3, 2021, which is effectively 12:00 a.m. JST on October 4.) Toho released both parts of the first season on Blu-ray across four volumes, with the first volume releasing on April 21, 2021. The anime's fourth Blu-ray volume was released on March 16, 2022, and included an unaired episode.

Funimation streamed the series on its website in North America, Mexico, Brazil, and the British Isles, in parts of Europe, Central Asia and North Africa through Wakanim, and in Australia and New Zealand through AnimeLab. The series also streamed on Hulu in the United States. On February 13, 2021, Funimation announced the series would have an English dub, with the first episode premiering the next day. Following Sony's acquisition of Crunchyroll, the series was moved to Crunchyroll. Crunchyroll released the first 11 episodes on DVD and Blu-ray in North America on December 5, 2022, with the latter 12 episodes as well as the unaired episode being released by the company on March 7, 2023. Crunchyroll also released the first season across two Blu-ray volumes in the United Kingdom and two Blu-ray and DVD volumes in Australia. Muse Communication has licensed the series in Southeast Asia and South Asia and streamed it on their Muse Asia YouTube channel and its respective regional variants, and iQIYI, Bilibili and WeTV in Southeast Asia, Netflix in South and Southeast Asia, Catchplay in Indonesia and Singapore, meWATCH in Singapore, and Sushiroll in Indonesia.

In March 2022, it was announced that a second season had been green-lit. It was directed by Hiroki Hirano, with scripts supervised by Toshiya Ono, and character designs handled by Sanae Shimada. The season premiered in two parts. The second season was collected into four Blu-ray volumes in Japan between October 18, 2023, and September 18, 2024. The first part of the second season aired from July 3 to September 25, 2023. The second part aired from April 8 to July 1, 2024, with Ryōsuke Shibuya replacing Hirano as the director.

A third season was announced following the airing of the second season's final episode. Shibuya returned to direct the season and also handled the series composition with Naoto Taniuchi. Ryōta Furukawa designed the characters with Shimada. The first part of the season premiered with the first two episodes back-to-back and aired from July 4 to September 28, 2026. The second part is set to premiere in 2027.

== Music ==
The soundtrack for Mushoku Tensei is composed by Yoshiaki Fujisawa. The series is unique in that the first season uses five different opening themes as background tracks for narrative progression rather than anime's traditional opening credit animation sequence.

=== Opening theme songs ===
| No. | Song Title | Artist | Season |
|---|---|---|---|
| 1 | "Tabibito no Uta" (The Traveler's Song) | Yuiko Ōhara | S1 (1–8) |
| 2 | "Mezame no Uta" (The Song of Awakening) | Yuiko Ōhara | S1 (10–13) |
| 3 | "継承の唄" (The Song of Inheritance) | Yuiko Ōhara | S1 (14–15) |
| 4 | "祈りの唄" (The Song of Prayer) | Yuiko Ōhara | S1 (16–18) |
| 5 | "遠くの子守の唄" (A Distant Lullaby) | Yuiko Ōhara | S1 (19–21) |
| 6 | "Spiral" | Longman | S2 (Part 1) |
| 7 | "On the Frontline" | Hitorie | S2 (Part 2) |

=== Ending theme songs ===
| No. | Song Title | Artist | Season |
|---|---|---|---|
| 1 | "Only" | Yuiko Ōhara | S1 (1–11) |
| 2 | "Kaze to Iku Michi" (The Way with the Wind) | Yuiko Ōhara | S1 (12–23) |
| 3 | "Musubime" (Knot) | Yuiko Ōhara | S2 (Part 1) |
| 4 | "Mamoritai Mono" (Something I Want to Protect) | Yuiko Ōhara | S2 (Part 2) |

=== Notable insert songs ===
| Song Title | Artist | Context |
|---|---|---|
| "Clover" | Yuiko Ōhara | Used during the emotional climax of season 2, episode 12. |
| "Heartfelt Cry" | Yoshiaki Fujisawa | Instrumental theme played during major battle sequences. |

== Reception ==
The anime adaptation received a positive response from IGN and was one of their Best Anime of 2021 nominees. IGN wrote, "In a time where every type of isekai is being developed, Mushoku Tensei: Jobless Reincarnation takes a joyful and wholehearted approach to the genre." Anime News Network's review was more mixed, with Theron Martin offering praise in his review while other critics offered mixed or negative impressions.

At the Anime Trending Awards, the series received eighteen nominations in total, resulting in seven wins. At the Crunchyroll Anime Awards, it received five nominations, including Best Isekai Anime (formerly known as Best Fantasy) for four consecutive years. Writing about the first season, Irfan Ghani Muhammad from Universitas Kiai Haji Achmad Siddiq Jember observed that Mushoku Tensei frequently challenges Rudeus's morality from various perspectives. His fear of the outside world starts changing when Roxy trains him and takes him on a journey through town, broadening his understanding of society. Ghani Muhammad also notes that Roxy undergoes a similar character arc, shaped by her differences from her people. HITC found that the anime properly followed the novel's narrative, most importantly Rudeus's coming-of-age story, which resonated with audiences. Comic Book Resources saw the focus on Rudeus's emotions as what marks the series as a major departure from other isekai storylines.

The second season's early episodes received mixed reactions, with controversy stemming from Rudeus's more despondent portrayal and a slight yet noticeable decline in animation quality due to scheduling issues. The positive reactions highlighted how Rudeus's character gained more depth through his solitude and attempts to connect with new characters. During the release of the anime's second season, a student of Rudeus buys a slave. Rudeus connects with her and gives her a name, Juliette. This led to several fans asking on Twitter why was Rudeus approving such act; Rifujin said that Rudeus has no hatred towards the idea of slavery due to the world he is exposed in the narrative and how it clashes with his original values. Rifujin's comment attracted controversial and negative response in media, which led him to clarifying that he does not condone slavery and neither does his character as "the original story is written with a kind of mild setting where it is accepted that".

The anime's Japanese Blu-ray releases have frequently appeared on Oricon's sales charts. The first Blu-ray volume of the third season reached the number one position on Oricon's daily anime Blu-ray chart.

=== LexBurner's controversy ===
On February 8, 2021, before the premiere of the fifth episode of the anime adaptation, a Chinese streaming network, Bilibili, temporarily halted the streaming of the anime on the grounds of a "technical failure". According to fan speculation, it might have been linked to the actions of the popular Chinese influencer LexBurner, who made derogatory remarks about the series and its fans, including a comment describing it as "for bottom-feeders in the social hierarchy". Following his comments, some of his followers left many low ratings for the series on the media-reviewing website, Douban, to review-bomb the series with a 1-star rating. However, the series concurrently enjoyed a 9.2/10 rating on Bilibili. This led to LexBurner being banned from the site. Later, author Rifujin na Magonote commented on LexBurner's actions:

His words are only his personal opinion, and he is free to hold whatever views he likes. Although I am displeased at how he has insulted other viewers, anime is not made only for successful people, so I hope that those who can enjoy it will enjoy it.

He further commented:

If that is the kind of online presence he is, that's just the way it is sometimes. Even in Japan, there are plenty of people like him, although they might not have his influence. As far as I am concerned, instead of engaging with him, I think it is more important to ignore him and grow your own communities. Thank you!
