= Land of the Lustrous =

Japanese manga series

- First tankōbon volume cover, featuring (top to bottom) Bort, Phosphophyllite, Diamond, and Morganite

宝石の国 (Hōseki no Kuni)
- Genre: Action; Fantasy; Post-apocalyptic
- Manga
- Written by: Haruko Ichikawa
- Published by: Kodansha
- English publisher: NA: Kodansha USA
- Imprint: Afternoon KC
- Magazine: Monthly Afternoon
- Original run: October 25, 2012 – April 25, 2024
- Volumes: 13
- Anime television series
- Land of the Lustrous (2017)
- icon

Land of the Lustrous (Japanese: 宝石の国, Hepburn: Hōseki no Kuni; lit. 'Land of Jewels') is a Japanese manga series written and illustrated by Haruko Ichikawa. It was serialized in Kodansha's seinen manga magazine Monthly Afternoon from October 2012 to April 2024, with its chapters collected in thirteen tankōbon volumes. Set in a world inhabited by Lustrous—immortal humanoid lifeforms who are the embodiments of gemstones—it chronicles their efforts to find the place where they belong while fighting to defend themselves against the celestial humanoid race known as the Lunarians. An anime television series adaptation by Orange aired between October and December 2017.

== Synopsis ==
Land of the Lustrous is set in a far distant future, where the Earth had been struck six times by meteorites, ravaging it in the process. All of the remaining land was reduced to a single coast, and nearly all life was destroyed. Over vast periods, a new race of sentient lifeforms emerged: immortal humanoids embodied by gemstones known as the Lustrous. Phosphophyllite (Phos) is weak (with one of the lowest hardnesses) and considered useless by their peers since they are too brittle to fight. Phos asks their aloof but wise colleague Cinnabar for help after they receive an assignment to create a natural history encyclopedia, thus beginning their friendship and personal growth. Meanwhile, the twenty-eight Lustrous led by their master, Kongo, are fighting to defend themselves against a celestial humanoid race called the Lunarians (Moon people), who inhabit the Moon and invade Earth every few days to take advantage of their luxury value while seeking to harvest the Lustrous' bodies for decorations.

== Characters ==
=== Jewels ===
Phosphophyllite (フォスフォフィライト, Fosufofiraito)
Voiced by: Tomoyo Kurosawa (Japanese); Sarah Wiedenheft (English)
Known as "Phos" for short. One of the weaker gems, having a hardness of 3.5. Declared too weak for battle, Phos is tasked with creating an encyclopedia logging new information. Despite this, as well as their immaturity and clumsiness, Phosphophyllite desires to enter the battlefield to be acknowledged by their peers and prove their worth. As Phos keeps experiencing hardships in battle, their limbs, along with their memories, are gradually lost and replaced with other minerals. At the same time, their personality and perspective begin to change gradually with each replacement.
Cinnabar (シンシャ, Shinsha)
Voiced by: Mikako Komatsu (Japanese); Avery Smithhart (English)
An aloof but wise gem that is even weaker than Phos, with a hardness of 2. They exude a powerful poison in their body. However, because this poison taints the environment and erases memories stored inside affected gem shards, Cinnabar is kept on night watch, although they yearn to escape.
Diamond (ダイヤモンド, Daiyamondo)
Voiced by: Ai Kayano (Japanese); Savanna Menzel (English)
A kind-hearted gem with a maximum hardness of 10, but is still fragile against enemy attacks.
Bort (ボルツ, Borutsu)
Voiced by: Ayane Sakura (Japanese); Genevieve Simmons (English)
An intimidating diamond-class gem who is powerful in combat and is the most durable of the gems. They are also very protective of Diamond.
Morganite (モルガナイト, Moruganaito)
Voiced by: Mutsumi Tamura (Japanese); Olivia Swasey (English)
A haughty gem who is very confident in their fighting capabilities. Goshenite's partner.
Goshenite (ゴーシェナイト, Gōshenaito)
Voiced by: Saori Hayami (Japanese); Juliet Simmons (English)
A sweet and responsible gem. Morganite's partner.
Rutile (ルチル, Ruchiru)
Voiced by: Yumi Uchiyama (Japanese); Shelley Calene-Black (English)
The medic gem in charge of fixing the other gems when they are broken, although they have a habit of wanting to dissect what catches their attention.
Jade (ジェード, Jēdo)
Voiced by: Ayahi Takagaki (Japanese); Heidi Hinkle (English)
A gem who works as secretary for Master Kongo. Euclase's partner.
Red Beryl (レッドベリル, Reddo Beriru)
Voiced by: Maaya Uchida (Japanese); Cat Thomas (English)
A gem in charge of designing and fixing the outfits of the other jewels, changing their hairstyle frequently.
Amethyst (アメシスト, Ameshisuto)
Voiced by: Kanae Itō (Japanese); Teresa Zimmerman (English)
Crystal twinning."84" and "33".
Twin gems that are always together and act in synchrony while talking and fighting. They also excel in sword fighting.
Benitoite (ベニトアイト, Benitoaito)
Voiced by: Ari Ozawa (Japanese); Elissa Cuellar (English)
A gem who is incapable of saying "no" to people who ask for their help.
Neptunite (ネプチュナイト, Nepuchunaito)
Voiced by: Atsumi Tanezaki (Japanese); Carli Mosier (English)
A young jewel person with a sharp tongue. Benitoite's partner.
Zircon (ジルコン, Jirukon)
Voiced by: Himika Akaneya (Japanese); Brittney Karbowski (English)
The second youngest gem after Phos, and Yellow Diamond's partner.
Obsidian (オブシディアン, Obushidian)
Voiced by: Ryō Hirohashi (Japanese); Shanae'a Moore (English)
A jewel person in charge of manufacturing the tools, weapons, and daily items for the other jewels.
Yellow Diamond (イエローダイヤモンド, Ierō Daiyamondo)
Voiced by: Junko Minagawa (Japanese); Allison Sumrall (English)
The oldest of the gems, and the fastest. Zircon's partner. They were once partnered with a Green Diamond.
Euclase (ユークレース, Yūkurēsu)
Voiced by: Mamiko Noto (Japanese); Serena Varghese (English)
One of the oldest gems, they are wise and kind. Jade's partner.
Alexandrite (アレキサンドライト, Arekisandoraito)
Voiced by: Rie Kugimiya (Japanese); Shelby Blocker (English)
A gem with an obsession with understanding the Lunarians, although they have a tendency to turn berserk when they see one. As such, Master Kongo has forbidden them from fighting.
Peridot (ペリドット, Peridotto)
Voiced by: Houko Kuwashima (Japanese); Jessica Portillo (English)
Papermaker, obsessed with their job.
Antarcticite (アンタークチサイト, Antākuchisaito)
Voiced by: Mariya Ise (Japanese); Alyssa Marek (English)
A gem who only appears during the winter when the other gems undergo hibernation. They have become much sturdier thanks to the cold.
Sphene (スフェン, Sufen)
Voiced by: Hitomi Nabatame (Japanese); Natalie Jones (English)
Artisan, a sweet and calm gem. Peridot's partner.
Watermelon Tourmaline (ウォーターメロントルマリン, Wōtāmeron Torumarin)
Voiced by: Sayaka Harada (Japanese); Jessica Portillo (English)
Energetic younger gem.
Hemimorphite (ヘミモルファイト, Hemimorufaito)
Voiced by: Reina Ueda (Japanese); Aimee Heimbuecher (English)
Known as Hemimor, a fighter and Watermelon Tourmaline's partner.
Heliodor (ヘリオドール, Heriodōru)
Voiced by: M·A·O (Japanese); Samantha Stevens (English)
A golden-colored gem, taken by the Lunarians before the beginning of the story.
Padparadscha (パパラチア, Paparachia)
Voiced by: Romi Park (Japanese); Christina Kelly (English)
Rutile's partner. A gem nearly as old and strong as the diamonds, who was born incomplete, hence spending most of their time asleep.
Ghost Quartz (ゴースト・クォーツ, Gōsuto Kuōtsu)
A quiet and calm gem who works as a librarian and takes part in patrol duty. They are also in charge of the long-term recovery facilities located on the fourth floor (third floor in the anime).
Lapis Lazuli (ラピスラズリ, Rapisu Razuri)
A charming gem who is a former partner of Ghost Quartz after they were taken by the Lunarians. Upon being taken, only their head was able to be retrieved. This head would later on be used by Phosphophyllite.
Cairngorm (カンゴーム, Kangōmu)
A Gem created from the inner shell of Ghost Quartz, who accompanied Phosphophyllite to the moon, albeit reluctantly. After Cairngorm arrived, they earned the role of the "Princess" of the Lunarians and developed a romantic relationship with Aechmea.
Master Kongo (金剛先生, Kongō-sensei)
Voiced by: Jouji Nakata (Japanese); Brian Mathis (English)
A powerful monk who oversees the gems and acts as a teacher and father figure to them. He is much sturdier than the gems, and when meditating or sleeping, he scarcely wakes up. His outer shell is composed of hexagonal diamond (lonsdaleite). He is later revealed to have a connection to the Lunarians, a mysterious celestial humanoid race who inhabits the Moon and frequently comes down to Earth to capture the gems.

=== Admirabilis ===
Ventricosus (ウェントリコスス, Wentorikosusu)
Voiced by: Chiwa Saitō (Japanese); Luci Christian (English)
She is the king of the admirabilis.
Aculeatus (アクレアツス, Akureatsusu)
Voiced by: Yūko Sanpei (Japanese); Maggie Flecknoe (English)
He is the younger brother of Ventricosus.

=== Lunarians ===
Prince Aechmea (エクメア, Ekumea)
The leader of the Lunarians. Though his people call him the "prince", it is an honorific title. He is revealed to have connections with Kongo, as he and his people rely on him to allow them to pass on. He goes as far as capturing the Gems and grinding them to dust to get Kongo's attention from Earth.
Cicada (セミ, Semi)
A big and muscular Lunarian who assists Phos during their stay on the Moon. They are shown to possess a demon-like battle form when on land.
Barbata
The lead scientist of the Lunarians, known as the "tech supervisor", is in charge of the synthetic Gem factory with Amethyst 84 as their work partner. He is seen first running the Gem restoration project and later teaching the Gems on the Moon about science.
Quieta
A fashion designer who has designed Cairngorm's outfits.
Kima
A fashion designer and student of Quieta who has designed Phosphophyllite's outfits.

== Media ==
=== Manga ===
Written and illustrated by Haruko Ichikawa, Land of the Lustrous started in Kodansha's seinen manga magazine Monthly Afternoon magazine on October 25, 2012. The manga entered on hiatus from December 2020 to June 2022, and later from October 2023 to February 2024. It ended serialization on April 25, 2024. Kodansha has collected its chapters into individual tankōbon volumes. The first volume was released on July 23, 2013, with a promotional video by Studio Hibari released on the same day. The thirteenth and last volume was released on November 21, 2024.

Kodansha Comics announced during their 2016 New York Comic Con panel that they have licensed the manga in North America in English. The thirteen volumes were released from June 27, 2017, to November 4, 2025.

==== Volumes ====
No.	Original release date	Original ISBN	English release date	English ISBN
1	July 23, 2013	978-4-06-387906-3	June 27, 2017	978-1-68233-728-8 (digital); 978-1-63236-497-5 (print)
1. "Phosphophyllite" (フォスフォフィライト, Fosufofiraito); 2. "Cinnabar" (シンシャ, Shinsha); 3. "Diamond" (ダイヤモンド, Daiyamondo); 4. "Cochlea" (コクレア, Kokurea); 5. "Metamorphosis" (メタモルフォス, Metamorufosu); 6. "Extract" (エクストラクト, Ekusutorakuto); Bonus: "Land of the Late-Night Gaming" (よあそびのくに, Yoasobi no Kuni)
2	January 23, 2014	978-4-06-387950-6	August 22, 2017	978-1-68233-809-4 (digital); 978-1-63236-498-2 (print)
7. "Ventricosus" (ウェントリコスス, Wentorikosusu); 8. "Ocean" (海, Umi); 9. "Spirit, Flesh, Bone" (魂・肉・骨, Tamashī, Niku, Hone); 10. "Homecoming" (帰還, Kikan); 11. "New Legs" (新しい足, Atarashī Ashi); 12. "Yellow Diamond" (イエローダイヤモンド, Ierō Daiyamondo); 13. "Twin Crystals" (双晶, Sōshō); Bonus: "Land of the Latest Fashion" (おしゃれのくに, Oshare no Kuni)
3	August 22, 2014	978-4-06-387992-6	October 24, 2017	978-1-68233-936-7 (digital); 978-1-63236-528-6 (print)
14. "First Battle" (初陣, Uijin); 15. "Hibernation" (冬眠, Tōmin); 16. "Ice Floes" (流氷, Ryūhyō); 17. "The Shore of Nascency" (緒の浜, Cho no Hama); 18. "Antarcticite" (アンタークチサイト, Antākuchisaito); 19. "New Hands" (新しい手, Atarashī Te); 20. "Winter's End" (冬の終わり, Fuyu no Owari); Bonus: "Land of the Lonely Winter" (冬のくに, Fuyu no Kuni)
4	May 22, 2015	978-4-06-388044-1; 978-4-06-362299-7 (LE)	December 26, 2017	978-1-64212-046-2 (digital); 978-1-63236-529-3 (print)
21. "Spring" (春, Haru); 22. "Changed" (変容, Henyō); 23. "Acumen" (判断, Handan); 24. "Retreat" (撤退, Tettai); 25. "Division" (分岐, Bunki); 26. "Cry" (鳴き声, Nakigoe); 27. "Secret" (秘密, Himitsu); 28. "Shiro" (しろ); Bonus: "Land of the Transformation" (変身のくに, Henshin no Kuni)
5	November 20, 2015	978-4-06-388101-1	March 13, 2018	978-1-64212-144-5 (digital); 978-1-63236-635-1 (print)
29. "Padparadscha" (パパラチア, Paparachia); 30. "Empty Black Spot" (虚黒点(からこくてん), Kara Kokuten); 31. "Fresh" (新鮮な, Shinsenna); 32. "Angst" (不安, Fuan); 33. "Distance" (距離, Kyori); 34. "Reversal" (反転, Hanten); 35. "A Pair" (ふたり, Futari); 36. "A New Job" (新しい仕事, Atarashī Shigoto); Bonus: "Land of the Longstanding Puzzle" (パズルのくに, Pazuru no Kuni)
6	September 23, 2016	978-4-06-388185-1; 978-4-06-362329-1 (LE)	July 17, 2018	978-1-64212-338-8 (digital); 978-1-63236-636-8 (print)
37. "Instead" (代わりに, Kawari ni); 38. "Ghost Quartz" (ゴースト・クオーツ, Gōsuto Kuōtsu); 39. "Self-Admonition" (自戒, Jikai); 40. "A Name" (名前, Namae); 41. "Scene" (景色, Keshiki); 42. "Explosion" (破裂, Haretsu); 43. "The Game Board" (盤上, Banjō); 44. "Shortcut" (近道, Chikamichi); Bonus: "Land of the Lucky Sightings" (幸運のくに, Kōun no Kuni)
7	May 23, 2017	978-4-06-388259-9; 978-4-06-362365-9 (LE)	November 13, 2018 (digital); November 20, 2018 (print)	978-1-64212-526-9 (digital); 978-1-63236-637-5 (print)
45. "The Long Winter" (長い冬, Nagai Fuyu); 46. "Lapis Lazuli" (ラピス・ラズリ, Rapisu Razuri); 47. "102 Years" (百二年, Hyaku Ni-nen); 48. "An Old Tale Heard in the Sea" (海で聞いた昔話, Umi de Kīta Mukashibanashi); 49. "On the Trail" (辿(たど)る, Tadoru); 50. "The Doctor" (博士, Hakase); 51. "Legend" (伝説, Densetsu); 52. "Journey" (旅路, Tabiji); Bonus: "Land of the Linen Launching" (枕投げのくに, Makura Nage no Kuni)
8	November 22, 2017	978-4-06-510363-0	April 9, 2019	978-1-64212-811-6 (digital); 978-1-63236-727-3 (print)
53. "Moon World" (月世界, Gessekai); 54. "A Machine For Prayer" (祈りのための機械, Inori no Tame no Kikai); 55. "Curse" (呪い, Noroi); 56. "Synthetic Pearl" (合成真珠, Gōsei Shinju); 57. "Crossroads" (岐路, Kiro); 58. "Hope" (希望, Kibō); 59. "Unrest" (動揺, Dōyō); 60. "Suspicion" (懐疑, Kaigi); 61. "Parting" (訣別(けつべつ), Ketsubetsu); Bonus: "Land of the Loungewear" (ねまきのくに, Nemaki no Kuni)
9	October 23, 2018	978-4-06-513101-5; 978-4-06-513102-2 (LE)	September 24, 2019	978-1-64659-021-6 (digital); 978-1-63236-844-7 (print)
62. "Distant View" (遠景, Enkei); 63. "High Hopes" (期待, Kitai); 64. "One Day" (或(あ)る日, Aru Hi); 65. "Today" (今日, Kyō); 66. "Freedom" (自由, Jiyū); 67. "Cairngorm" (カンゴーム, Kangōmu); 68. "Change" (変転, Henten); 69. "Constancy" (不変, Fuhen); 70. "Before Dawn" (未明, Mimei); Bonus: "Land of the New Labels" (どうぐのくに, Dōgu no Kuni)
10	August 23, 2019	978-4-06-516738-0; 978-4-06-516739-7 (LE)	February 25, 2020	978-1-64659-335-4 (digital); 978-1-63236-915-4 (print)
71. "Failure" (失敗, Shippai); 72. "Savior" (救世主, Kyūseishu); 73. "Choice" (選択, Sentaku); 74. "Ceremony" (祭典, Saiten); 75. "Wish" (願い事, Negaigoto); 76. "Admirabilis" (アドミラビリス, Adomirabirisu); 77. "Authentication" (認証, Ninshō); 78. "Passage" (経過, Keika); 79. "220 Years" (二百二十年, Ni Hyaku Ni Jū-nen); Bonus: "Land of the Lavish Gowns" (ドレスのくに, Doresu no Kuni)
11	July 20, 2020	978-4-06-520224-1; 978-4-06-520223-4 (LE)	August 24, 2021 (digital); August 31, 2021 (print)	978-1-63699-178-8 (digital); 978-1-63236-989-5 (print)
80. "Three Races" (三族, San-zoku); 81. "Souvenir" (土産, Miyage); 82. "Outcome" (成り行き, Nariyuki); 83. "Reflection" (返照, Henshō); 84. "The Eve" (前夜, Zenya); 85. "Birthday" (誕生日, Tanjōbi); 86. "War" (開戦, Kaisen); 87. "Silence" (静寂, Seijaku); 88. "Nature, Experiments, Future" (自然・実験・未来, Shizen, Jikken, Mirai); Bonus: "Land of the Less Aged" (若さのくに, Waka-sa no Kuni)
12	November 22, 2022	978-4-06-529732-2; 978-4-06-529733-9 (LE)	August 22, 2023	979-8-88933-171-1 (digital); 978-1-64651-620-9 (print)
89. "Yama" (エンマ, Enma); 90. "Crushed" (破砕, Hasai); 91. "Jade" (ジェード, Jēdo); 92. "Night" (夜, Yoru); 93. "The Promise" (約束, Yakusoku); 94. "Kongo" (金剛, Kongō); 95. "War's End" (終戦, Shūsen); 96. "Ten Thousand Years" (一万年, Ichi Man-nen); 97. "Dream" (夢, Yume); 98. "Prayer" (祈り, Inori); Bonus: "Land of the Loving Reunions" (再会のくに, Saikai no Kuni)
13	November 21, 2024	978-4-06-537477-1; 978-4-06-537478-8 (LE)	November 4, 2025	979-8-89478-742-8 (digital); 979-8-88877-055-9 (print)
99. "Beginning" (始まり, Hajimari); 100. "Harmony" (調和, Chōwa); 101. "Vestiges" (残余, Zanyo); 102. "The Sibling" (兄, Ani); 103. "Clean" (無垢, Muku); 104. "Paradise" (楽園, Rakuen); 105. "The Sun" (太陽, Taiyō); 106. "The Bridge" (橋, Hashi); 107. "In the End" (終わりに, Owari ni); 108. "Land of the Lustrous" (宝石の国, Hōseki no Kuni)

=== Anime ===
An anime television series adaptation aired in Japan between October 7 and December 23, 2017. Takahiko Kyōgoku directed the series at the Orange CG animation studio. Toshiya Ono wrote series scripts and Yōichi Nishikawa created the concept art. Asako Nishida designed the characters. The opening theme is "Kyōmen no Nami" (鏡面の波; 'The Waves on the Mirror's Surface') by Yurika and the ending theme is "Kirameku Hamabe" (煌めく浜辺; 'Sparkling Beach') by Yuiko Ōhara. Sentai Filmworks have licensed the series and streamed the anime on Anime Strike. MVM Films has licensed the series in the UK. The series ran for 12 episodes, which was released across six DVD and Blu-ray sets in Japan.

== Reception ==
Land of the Lustrous was number 10 on the Takarajimasha's Kono Manga ga Sugoi! list of top 20 Manga for Male Readers in 2014. It was number 48 on the 15th Book of the Year list by Da Vinci magazine in 2014; and 46 on the 20th edition in 2020. It was nominated for the eighth Manga Taishō award in 2015. The series ranked 19th in the first Next Manga Award in the print manga category. The series won the 2024 Sense of Gender Awards Grand Prize. In 2025, the series won the grand prize at the 45th Nihon SF Taisho Awards and the Seiun Award in the Best Comic category.

By October 2017, Land of the Lustrous had over 1.4 million copies in circulation. By April 2018, the manga had over 1.8 million copies in circulation. The first volume of the manga series reached the 47th place on the weekly Oricon manga chart and, by July 27, 2013, has sold 21,204 copies; volume 2 reached the 35th place; and, by February 2, 2014, has sold 44,511 copies; volume 3 reached the 30th place; and, by August 31, 2014, has sold 56,765 copies.
