= List of The Executioner and Her Way of Life episodes =

The Executioner and Her Way of Life is a 2022 anime television series directed by Yoshiki Kawasaki and animated by J.C.Staff. The 12 episodes are adapted from the light novels of the same name written by Mato Sato and illustrated by Nilitsu. The story focuses on Akari, a girl summoned from Japan to another realm who gains the power to control time, and Menou, a young priestess tasked with killing Akari to protect the stability of her own world.

At the "GA Fes 2021" event livestream, it was announced that the light novels would be receiving an anime adaptation by J.C.Staff. Shōgo Yasukawa supervised the scripts, Keiko Tamaki designed the characters, and Michiru composed the series' music. Egg Firm and SB Creative produced the series. It aired from April 2 to June 18, 2022, on Tokyo MX, BS11, and AT-X. (Note: Tokyo MX lists the series premiere at 24:30 on April 1, 2022, which is effectively 12:30 a.m. JST on April 2.)

The first six episodes cover the first volume of the novel series, and the last six cover the second one. The opening theme song is "Paper Bouquet" by Mili, while the ending theme song is "Tomoshibi Serenade" (Serenade by Lamplight) by ChouCho.

Sentai Filmworks licensed the series outside of Asia and is streaming it on Hidive. On May 11, 2022, Hidive announced that the series would receive an English dub, which premiered on May 20. Medialink licensed the series in Southeast Asia, South Asia, and Oceania (minus Australia and New Zealand).

== Episodes ==
No.	Title	Directed by	Written by	Storyboarded by	Original release date (Note: Tokyo MX and BS11 listed the series air dates on Friday at 24:30, which is effectively Saturday at 0:30 a.m. JST.)
1	"The Executioner"; Transliteration: "Shokeinin" (Japanese: 処刑人)	Yoshiki Kawasaki	Shōgo Yasukawa	Yoshiki Kawasaki	April 2, 2022
Mutou Mitsuki is summoned from Japan to another world by King Grisarika, who evaluates him for his power. Mitsuki is surprised when the king summons another person, a girl from Japan, while he is thrown out of the castle. He meets a priestess called Menou who explains that people from Japan with powers called Lost Ones have been summoned throughout history and influenced the world's culture. She also explains that besides the commoners, society is split between the nobility, the Noblesse, and the Church, the Faust. Exploring his power, Mitsuki discovers his Pure Concept is highly destructive in nature. Menou kills him instantly, revealing she is an assassin for the Faust, specializing in killing Lost Ones before they can harm the world. She reports her successful kill to Archbishop Orwell and the existence of the second Lost One. A flashback shows Menou was the sole survivor of a disaster caused by a Lost One, who was then assassinated by Flare, the Executioner who eventually trained Menou. In the present, soldiers attack, revealing the king wants to use the other Lost One's unusually powerful Pure Concept to overthrow the church. Menou gets assistance from Momo, her aide and childhood friend obsessed with her, and kills the soldiers then infiltrates the castle where the Japanese girl, Akari Tokito, is being kept.
2	"The Lost One"; Transliteration: "Mayoibito" (Japanese: 迷い人)	Yoshiaki Iwasaki	Shōgo Yasukawa	Yoshiki Kawasaki	April 9, 2022
Akari reveals her Pure Concept is a healing ability before Menou assassinates her. However, upon Akari's death, her power activates, revealing it is actually the Pure Concept of Time, capable of reversing her death and reviving her with no memory of Menou's kill. Contacting Orwell, Menou explains Akari's power; Orwell demands Akari be brought to her in Garm in three days for a ritual that will kill her. Menou finds Akari is absent-minded but also a romantic who desires adventure. She convinces her the ceremony will send her back to Japan, but Akari is disappointed, as she feels meeting Menou was fate. Momo is upset that Menou has to spend time with a target and insists on secretly travelling with them to Garm. Menou warns Akari not to use her power, but is forced to cover for her anyway when Akari does so to heal a little girl's hand. Momo notices Grisarika's warlike daughter Ashuna on the same train to Garm. As they depart, Menou feels sorry for Akari that she is taking her to her death. Elsewhere, the church arrests King Grisarika for heresy.
3	"Taboo in [Red]"; Transliteration: "Kinki no [Aka]" (Japanese: 禁忌の【赤】)	Shigeru Ueda	Shōgo Yasukawa	Shigeru Ueda	April 16, 2022
Terrorists seeking to capture Ashuna take over the train, and Momo learns they want to trade Ashuna for their imprisoned leader. Heading to the roof of the train, Momo meets Ashuna, who has a grudge against the Faust. Seeing Momo is a priestess, Ashuna starts a fight, leading to the two falling off the train. In the train, Menou defeats the terrorists, who sacrifice their bodies to craft an armored warrior that damages the engine, causing the train to speed out of control. Menou, Ashuna and Momo suddenly experience extreme déjà vu, and Menou is joined by Akari, who says she was worried. Menou defeats the warrior, but is forced to borrow power to stop the train by connecting her soul to Akari's Pure Concept. Menou cannot shake the uncomfortable feeling that the train actually did crash and kill everyone, meaning Akari must have reversed time for the entire world to save everyone on board. Meanwhile, Momo is annoyed when her duel with Ashuna lasts long into the next morning with no end in sight.
4	"The Ancient Capital Garm"; Transliteration: "Koto Garumu" (Japanese: 古都ガルム)	Yoshiyuki Nogami	Shōgo Yasukawa	Yoshiki Kawasaki	April 23, 2022
As Menou and Akari continue their journey to Garm, Menou recalls her childhood after being rescued by Flare. Having had her soul bleached from the disaster, Menou lost her own desires, deciding only to follow Flare wherever she went. After witnessing Flare kill numerous Lost Ones, Menou asked to become Flare's apprentice despite Flare warning that Executioners like her are villains. When Menou explained her desire to not allow anyone else to have to take on the burden of being an Executioner, Flare decided to train Menou to become a perfect copy of her. In the present, Menou and Akari arrive at Garm, and Akari asks Menou to take her on a "date" around the city. At the cathedral, Orwell welcomes the two girls, saying the special chamber will be ready in two days. In the meantime, Menou is tasked with investigating the mysterious disappearances of young girls. Menou assigns Momo, who managed to evade Ashuna, to take care of the investigation so she can go out with Akari.
5	"Goodbye"; Transliteration: "Sayonara" (Japanese: さよなら)	Yoshihiro Mori	Shōgo Yasukawa	Yūichi Nihei	April 30, 2022
Menou and Akari spend time with each other before heading to the ritual chamber, where Menou prepares to witness Akari's death. Meanwhile, Momo investigates the case of the missing women and follows a lead into the sewers. There, she finds Ashuna, who proposes joining together into a temporary alliance to figure out what is going on below Garm. Underneath the palace, the two girls discover a summoning chamber, proving the Noblesse in Garm are involved in summoning. However, Ashuna points out that the knowledge of summoning is exclusive only to the Faust, meaning a high ranking Faust must be collaborating with them. Momo realizes that this would have to be Orwell, and sends a warning to Menou before she and Ashuna are attacked by monsters. Menou tries to interrupt the ritual but is cornered by Orwell, who explains that she plans to use the chamber to erase Akari's mind so Orwell can control her Pure Concept to reverse her aging, effectively becoming immortal. Orwell was actually responsible for the missing women, and was attempting to use them in failed experiments before Akari was summoned. Intending to use Menou as a sacrifice for the ritual, Orwell summons a monster to attack her.
6	"[Regression: Memories, Soul, Spirit]"; Transliteration: "[Kaiki: Kioku Tamashii Seishin]" (Japanese: 【回帰:記憶・魂・精神】)	Katsushi Sakurabi	Shōgo Yasukawa	Yoshiki Kawasaki	May 7, 2022
While Menou fights Orwell's monster, the archbishop reveals that it was her manipulation of a Lost One's power that destroyed Menou's village. In the ritual chamber, as Akari is about to get sacrificed, her power of Pure Concept of Time takes effect automatically, retrieving her memories, soul and spirit to a certain time point from the past. This allows her to consciously use her Pure Concept to escape the ritual, before she willingly erases her memories again to avoid jeopardizing the future through her knowledge. Meanwhile, when one of the monsters she and Ashuna are fighting destroys Momo's hair ribbons, a gift from Menou, Momo goes berserk and attacks Orwell's cathedral, allowing Akari to rejoin Menou. Menou taps into Akari's Pure Concept, super-aging Orwell to death, and Ashuna takes her leave. However, during their joining, Menou and Akari have troubling visions of their future, in which Akari unwillingly causes Menou to die to Flare after Menou fails to complete her mission. Akari wishes to herself for only Menou to kill her, so that Menou can live even if Akari dies. Meanwhile, Menou vows to Momo that she will find a way to kill Akari once and for all.
7	"Port City of Libelle"; Transliteration: "Minatomachi Ribēru" (Japanese: 港町リベール)	Yoshiyuki Nogami	Shōgo Yasukawa	Katsushi Sakurabi	May 14, 2022
Menou realizes that the visions are actually flashbacks from past timelines, and that Akari used her Pure Concept to rewind time after she caused Menou's death, which also made Akari lose her conscious memories of their time together. On the way to the Sanctuary, which Menou claims is a residential area for Lost Ones, Menou and Akari arrive at Libelle, a port city and the site where one of the Four Major Human Errors, the Pandæmonium, had manifested and was sealed away. The city is also a base for the Fourth, a radical group led by Count Libelle and his daughter Manon, who both have a grudge against Flare for killing Manon's mother, a Lost One. Upon learning of Menou's arrival, the Fourth decide to assassinate her. Meanwhile, Menou tries to eliminate Akari by drugging her and sending her through the fog wall which contains the Pandæmonium, but Akari's power activates once more, sending her back to Menou's side. Menou's resolve begins to falter as she develops feelings for Akari. Elsewhere, Manon leads a young girl into an iron maiden-like device which harvests her blood.
8	"Monstrine"; Transliteration: "Mayaku" (Japanese: 魔薬)	Yoshiaki Iwasaki	Shōgo Yasukawa	Kiyotaka Ōhata	May 21, 2022
Menou returns to Libelle with Akari only to be ambushed by members of the Fourth. The attackers are defeated and arrested, but are forcibly turned into monsters by Manon to prevent them from spilling secrets. The other members of the Fourth confront Manon, who reveals that she used the drug monstrine, an addictive substance sold in the city to fund their operations, to turn the captured attackers into monsters. She also reveals that she slipped monstrine into their food earlier, leaving them no choice but to follow her orders as she plans her revenge on Flare's apprentice. Meanwhile, Menou is tasked by Pastor Silica to stop the production of monstrine in return for travel funds. Menou is able to secure an invitation to a ball hosted by Manon so that she can investigate her, but is forced to bring Akari along when she insists on attending too. As Momo helps track down the source of monstrine, she encounters Ashuna, who is also investigating the Fourth.
9	"At the Evening Ball"; Transliteration: "Yakai nite" (Japanese: 夜会にて)	Shigeru Ueda	Shōgo Yasukawa	Kōichirō Sōtome	May 28, 2022
Menou infiltrates Libelle Island and tries to find evidence implicating Manon in monstrine production, but encounters Ashuna, who challenges her to a duel when Menou tries to hide her identity. With no other choice, Menou battles Ashuna and is able to evade her, but loses her chance to scout the castle. Meanwhile, Akari regains her memories again and realizes events in this timeline have diverged significantly from previous ones. Manon then approaches her, revealing she knows Akari is a Lost One. Elsewhere, Momo infiltrates the monstrine production facility and opens an iron maiden, finding the girl that Manon put inside earlier and triggering a trap that leaves Momo severely injured. Learning what Momo discovered, Menou asks Pastor Silica to have the authorities surround Libelle Island since she has enough evidence linking Manon and the Fourth to monstrine production. As the authorities lay siege to the island, Akari confronts Manon, intending to get answers from her.
10	"The Daughter of a Lost One"; Transliteration: "Mayoibito no Musume" (Japanese: 迷い人の娘)	Katsushi Sakurabi	Shōgo Yasukawa	Katsushi Sakurabi	June 4, 2022
Manon reveals that somebody informed her that Akari has regressed the timeline multiple times, which allowed Manon to take action to change it. She uses monstrine to give herself a living shadow and attacks Akari, whose Pure Concept is ineffective against her, but Menou arrives just in time to save Akari. Menou then faces off against Manon, who reveals she wanted to obtain taboo power to provoke the Faust into killing her, just like they did to her mother. Menou mortally wounds Manon, who uses her death as a sacrifice to summon the young girl in the iron maiden, who reveals herself to be the Human Error Pandæmonium. Like Akari, Pandæmonium cannot be killed due to her Pure Concept of "Evil", which regenerates a new body whenever she is killed. Pandæmonium challenges Menou to find a way to kill her as she summons an army of monsters.
11	"Pandæmonium"; Transliteration: "Pandemoniumu" (Japanese: 万魔殿(パンデモニウム))	Yoshiyuki Nogami	Shōgo Yasukawa	Takeshi Mori	June 11, 2022
Menou battles Pandæmonium but soon begins to run out of ether. Fortunately, Ashuna arrives and provides crucial support, allowing Menou to use a powerful spell to trap Pandæmonium. However, she manages to escape and summons a large monster. Meanwhile, Akari uses her power to heal Momo, but is confronted by a clone of Pandæmonium. The clone reveals that due to Akari's repeated resets of the timeline, the world is slowly collapsing, weakening the fog wall enough for her to squeeze a small portion of her real body through. Pandæmonium also reveals that Akari's attempts to be killed by Menou are doomed to fail due to beings like Flare having access to powerful magic that records past timelines, and that there is a way for Akari to return to Japan. Elsewhere, Menou figures out that the monster Pandæmonium summoned will only manifest temporarily before it is pulled back into the fog wall, with the same happening to Pandæmonium herself. However, before Pandæmonium is fully pulled back in, she transforms herself into a monster for one final battle against Menou and Ashuna.
12	"The Duo's Journey"; Transliteration: "Futari no Tabiji" (Japanese: ふたりの旅路)	Yoshiki Kawasaki	Shōgo Yasukawa	Yoshiki Kawasaki	June 18, 2022
Menou and Ashuna battle Pandæmonium, but are forced to split up when Pandæmonium sends her minions to attack the town. While Ashuna protects the town, Menou fights Pandæmonium alone until Ashuna comes back to lend Menou her sword and Akari arrives to provide her with power. Menou powers up Ashuna's sword with Akari's ether and destroys Pandæmonium. As her body dissolves, Pandæmonium reveals to Menou that the Sword of Salt, the creation of another Human Error, can kill Pure Concepts like Akari. Menou is left troubled, wondering what she would do if she could ensure Akari would not be a threat without killing her. Akari once again suppresses her memories and the two continue their journey. As Momo observes Menou's growing friendship with Akari, she vows to kill Akari in Menou's stead. Elsewhere, Manon is revived by another Pandæmonium fragment, and wonders if Pandæmonium is her older sister, having been sent to this world far ahead of her mother. Manon agrees to help Pandæmonium spread chaos across the world. Meanwhile, Flare is informed that Pandæmonium and the Mechanical Society, another Human Error, are beginning to become active. Encouraged by this news, Flare resolves to kill Menou again to continue forcing Akari to reset the timeline.
