= Longman (band) =

Japanese punk rock band

- Origin: Matsuyama, Japan
- Genres: Rock; Punk rock
- Years active: 2012–present
- Labels: Katachidake Records (2013); Belde Records (2014); VION (2015–2019); Sony Music Entertainment Japan (2020–)
- Members: Sawa Yoriki; Hiroya Hirai; Yuki Horikawa
- Website: longman.jp

Longman (stylized as LONGMAN) is a Japanese punk rock band formed in 2012 in Matsuyama, Ehime Prefecture, currently consisting of Sawa Yoriki, Hiroya Hirai and Yuki Horikawa. They released their first studio album, Neverland in 2014, and made their major label debut with Sony Music Entertainment Japan in 2020 with their third album Just A Boy.

The band was formed from a music club at Matsuyama University, and made their debut in 2013 with the EP Stay Hungry, Stay Foolish. Longman have released 5 studio albums, their fourth, This Is Youth, peaking at 20th on the Oricon Albums Chart. In 2023, their song Spiral released as the opening theme to the first cour of the second season of Mushoku Tensei.

== Biography ==
Longman formed in 2012 from a music club at Matsuyama University. The band name comes from the Longman English-Japanese Dictionary. Member Hiroya Hirai told an interviewer in 2015: "I was looking for good words in that dictionary, and when I closed it thinking, 'I can't find it', I looked at the cover and thought, 'This is it'.

The band released their first full-length album, Neverland, in July 2014.

They released their second mini album, tick, in August 2015. The album won the Shikoku Block Award at 8th CD Shop Award.

The band's second full-length album, So Young, was released in November 2016.

Longman temporarily suspended live activities from June 2017 to July 2018 while member Sawa Yoriki received treatment for health issues related to her throat. The group resumed live activities with a concert in Ehime Prefecture.

The group's third mini album, Walking, was released in September 2018.

On March 10, 2019, during a concert in Matsuyama, Longman announced they had signed to major label Sony Music Associated Records. The group made its major label debut in November with the single "Wish On", which served as the ending theme for Boruto: Naruto Next Generations.

The group released the album Just A Boy in February 2020. The album features the song "Replay", the theme song for the TV Tokyo drama Yuru Camp△.

In April 2021, the group released the album This Is Youth, which includes the song "Hello Youth", the theme song for the TV Tokyo drama Yuru Camp△2.

The group released the EP Lyra (ライラ) in May 2022. The title track of the same name served as the ending theme for Yomiuri TV/Nippon TV anime series Love All Play.

In 2023, Longman released "Spiral", the opening theme for the second season of Mushoku Tensei. They released the full-length album 10/4 in October.

== Members ==
- Sawa Yoriki – bass, vocals
- Hiroya Hirai – guitar, vocals
- Yuki "Horihori" Horikawa – drums, vocals

== Discography ==
=== Studio albums ===
Title	Album details	Peak chart positions
Title	Album details	JPN
Neverland	Released: July 16, 2014; Label: Belde Records; Formats: CD, digital download	—
So Young	Released: November 2, 2016; Label: VION; Formats: CD, digital download	33
Just A Boy	Released: February 5, 2020; Label: Sony Music Associated Records; Formats: CD, digital download	21
This Is Youth	Released: May 19, 2021; Label: Sony Music Associated Records; Formats: CD, digital download	20
10/4	Released: October 4, 2023; Label: Sony Music Associated Records; Formats: CD, digital download	31

=== Compilation albums ===
Title	Album details	Peak chart positions
Title	Album details	JPN
Dictionary～indies BEST 2013–2019～	Released: June 12, 2019; Label: VION; Formats: CD, digital download	15

=== Extended plays ===
Title	Album details	Peak chart positions
Title	Album details	JPN
Stay Hungry, Stay Foolish	Released: February 10, 2013; Label: Katachidake Records; Formats: CD, digital download	—
tick	Released: August 19, 2015; Label: VION; Formats: CD, digital download	—
Walking	Released: September 26, 2018; Label: VION; Formats: CD, digital download	21

=== Singles ===
Title	Year	Peak chart positions	Album
Title	Year	JPN	Album
"Wish On"	2019	38	Just A Boy
"Lyra" (ライラ)	2022	44	10/4
"Spiral"	2023	40	10/4
