= Land of the Lustrous (TV series) =

Japanese anime television series

- 宝石の国; Hōseki no Kuni
- Genre: Action; Fantasy; Post-apocalyptic
- Based on: Land of the Lustrous
- Created by: Haruko Ichikawa
- Directed by: Takahiko Kyōgoku
- Series composition: Toshiya Ono
- Character designer: Asako Nishida
- Music by: Yoshiaki Fujisawa
- Voices of: Tomoyo Kurosawa; Mariya Ise; Mikako Komatsu; Ai Kayano; Romi Park; Ayane Sakura; Yumi Uchiyama; Junko Minagawa; Rie Kugimiya; Joji Nakata; Mutsumi Tamura; Saori Hayami; Ayahi Takagaki; Himika Akaneya
- Opening theme: "Kyōmen no Nami" (鏡面の波) by Yurika
- Ending theme: "Kirameku Hamabe" (煌めく浜辺) by Yuiko Ōhara
- Country of origin: Japan
- Original language: Japanese
- No. of episodes: 12

Production
- Art director: Hisako Akagi
- Sound director: Yukio Nagasaki
- Cinematographer: Kenji Fujita
- Color designer: Osamu Mikasa
- CG director: Eiji Inomoto
- Editor: Daisuke Imai
- Animation producer: Katsuhiro Takei
- Studio: Orange
- Producers: Yōko Baba; Maya Fujino; Hiroshi Kamei; Tomoyo Kamiji; Hirotaka Kaneko; Mika Shimizu; Yūichi Tada; Yoshihiko Yamazaki; Kento Yoshida
- Production companies: "Land of the Lustrous" Production Committee (Note: Label consisting of various companies)

Original release
- Networks: AT-X, Tokyo MX, BS11, MBS
- Release: October 7 – December 23, 2017

Land of the Lustrous (Japanese: 宝石の国, Hepburn: Hōseki no Kuni; lit. 'Land of Jewels') is a Japanese anime television series based on Haruko Ichikawa's manga series Land of the Lustrous. It was produced by the computer graphics (CG) animation studio Orange and directed and written by Takahiko Kyōgoku and Toshiya Ono, respectively. It was broadcast from October to December 2017. It follows the Lustrous—immortal humanoid lifeforms who are the embodiments of gemstones—who fight to defend themselves against a celestial humanoid race known as the Lunarians, who seek to harvest their bodies for decorations. Phosphophyllite is the youngest of the Lustrous, and is given the task to assemble a natural history since they are too brittle to fight.

Orange created the series with 3D animation as a base, a decision made partially due to the difficulty in depicting translucent gemstones using hand-drawn animation. Yoichi Nishikawa's concept art greatly influenced Kyōgoku's vision for the series, with several shots directly based on Nishikawa's art. While the manga is more ambiguous and subtle, the anime had to be clear on a single viewing, so Phos was given more close-up shots and repeated lines to give them a larger presence and more easily identifiable goals. As Kyōgoku was used to writing teenaged characters with clear motives and desires, he initially had problems with portraying Phos, but his image of the character solidified after hearing Tomoyo Kurosawa's performance as them.

The series was well received by critics, frequently called among the best of the 2010s and a turning point for CG anime, and convincing skeptics that an action series could be well done outside of a 2D production. The writing was also positively received, with critics calling the characters and world likable and intriguing. It received several awards and nominations, namely for its visuals.

== Premise ==
Land of the Lustrous is set in the far future, in a land inhabited by an immortal life form called the Lustrous, who is the embodiment of gemstones. The twenty-eight Lustrous led by their teacher, Kongo, are fighting to defend themselves against a celestial humanoid race called the Lunarians, who inhabit the Moon and invade Earth every few days while seeking to harvest the Lustrous' bodies for decorations. Phosphophyllite, nicknamed Phos, currently 300 years old, is the youngest of the Lustrous, and because of their brittleness is unable to fight. They feel useless, but are given the task of assembling a natural history by Kongo. While looking for information to include in the book, Phos meets the nightwatch, Cinnabar, who is poisonous and thus dangerous even to other Lustrous, and therefore lives in isolation. Finding this sad, Phos decides to find Cinnabar a better job.

== Voice cast ==
Character	Japanese	English
Phosphophyllite	Tomoyo Kurosawa	Sarah Wiedenheft
Cinnabar	Mikako Komatsu	Avery Smithhart
Diamond	Ai Kayano	Savanna Menzel
Bort	Ayane Sakura	Genevieve Simmons
Morganite	Mutsumi Tamura	Olivia Swasey
Goshenite	Saori Hayami	Juliet Simmons
Rutile	Yumi Uchiyama	Shelly Calene-Black
Jade	Ayahi Takagaki	Heidi Hinkel
Zircon	Himika Akaneya	Brittney Karbowski
Yellow Diamond	Junko Minagawa	Allison Sumrall
Euclase	Mamiko Noto	Serena Varghese
Alexandrite	Rie Kugimiya	Shelby Blocker
Red Beryl	Maya Uchida	Cat Thomas
Amethyst 84 & 33	Kanae Itō	Teresa Zimmerman
Benitoite	Ari Ozawa	Elissa Cuellar
Neptunite	Atsumi Tanezaki	Carli Mosier
Obsidian	Ryō Hirohashi	Shanae’a Moore
Sphene	Hitomi Nabatame	Natalie Jones
Peridot	Houko Kuwashima	Jessica Portillo
Watermelon Tourmaline	Sayaka Harada	Jessica Portillo
Hemimorphite	Reina Ueda	Aimee Heimbuecher
Antarcticite	Mariya Ise	Alyssa Marek
Padparadscha	Romi Park	Christina Kelly
Heliodor	Mao Ichimichi	Samantha Stevens
Kongo	Joji Nakata	Brian Mathis
Ventricosus	Chiwa Saitō	Luci Christian
Aculeatus	Yūko Sanpei	Maggie Flecknoe
Ice		Kalin Coates

== Production ==
Land of the Lustrous was produced at the computer graphics (CG) animation studio Orange, and adapts Haruko Ichikawa's 2012 manga series Land of the Lustrous, covering little over its first four volumes. The series had Katsuhiro Takei and Kiyotaka Waki as production staff; and was directed by Takahiko Kyōgoku, with Toshiya Ono in charge of the series scripts, Eiji Inomoto serving as chief CG director, Kenji Fujita being director of photography, and with Daisuku Imai in charge of editing. Asako Nishida designed the characters, while Yōichi Nishikawa created the concept art, and Osamu Mikasa painted the color key art. The sound team included composer Yoshiaki Fujisawa and sound director Yukio Nagasaki. The opening theme, "Kyōmen no Nami" (鏡面の波; lit. 'The Waves on the Mirror's Surface'), was performed by Yurika, and the ending theme, "Kirameku Hamabe" (煌めく浜辺; lit. 'Sparkling Beach'), was performed by Yuiko Ōhara.

The project started in 2015, while Kyōgoku was working on the anime series Gate, and was approached by Katsuhiro Takei from Toho to work on an adaptation of the Land of the Lustrous manga. Kyōgoku had always wanted to create a work based on CG animation with complementing 2D animation, rather than the more common use of a 2D base with complementing 3D, and both Kyōgoku and Takei thought that that style would fit Land of the Lustrous. Takei wanted Orange to work on the project from the start; despite trusting their abilities due to the staff's previous experience with action in the Rebuild of Evangelion films, Kyōgoku was initially worried about them handling the full production due to the low number of staff members, but the studio expanded from 50 to 100 staff members during the production.

Although voice recording for anime productions typically is done after the animation is finished, it was done prior to the CG creation for Land of the Lustrous, after the animatics were created. Kyōgoku was happy with the casting, saying that Kurosawa embraced her role and "became" Phos, acting out lines physically, and that the supporting cast helped support the spontaneity of Phos's character. Kyōgoku also specifically noted being happy with casting Nakata as Kongo, as they had worked together before and as he loved Nakata's acting. Describing Nakata as a gentleman, he thought he was perfectly suited for the role, and said that a too charming or sultry voice would not have worked for the character.

=== Storytelling ===
After reading the manga for the first time, Kyōgoku thought that it would be difficult to surpass the manga by simply copying what was shown in each panel: according to him, the appeal of the manga was its ambiguity and subtlety, saying that there is more room for subtle portrayal in a manga since the reader can re-read it, whereas an anime aired on television needs to be clearer on a single viewing. Because of this, they made the protagonist clearer by giving Phos more close-up shots and having them repeat certain important lines, leading to them appearing to have a larger presence in the story and have more easily identifiable goals. Ono helped in this by breaking down difficult portions of the manga's story into scenes.

Kyōgoku and Ichikawa discussed the story development, and Kyōgoku was asked to leave it uncertain whether Phos's changes during the story are good or not, and to portray the change as starting with their meeting with Cinnabar, as Ichikawa saw those two elements as the foundation of Land of the Lustrous. She partook in story development meetings, and discussed how to achieve the right balance between exploring subjects in detail and prompting questions, such as what the true nature of the Lunarians is, due to how not everything could have been explained in twelve episodes. Although she told Kyōgoku about events in not yet published manga chapters, she asked him to avoid incorporating elements from future chapters; he saw his role as consisting of him organizing the manga material, and was happy with how much of the manga's story they were able to adapt, with the anime covering all parts he wanted to include.

Initially, Kyōgoku had some issues with how to portray Phos, as he was used to working with teenaged characters with obvious desires and motives, whereas Phos lacks resolve and is resigned to their frustration due to having spent 300 years doing nothing, not being too serious about their emotions even when angry. His image of Phos solidified after hearing Kurosawa's performance, saying that her acting had the right level of ambiguity for the character.

=== Visuals ===
Nishikawa's concept art (top) greatly influenced Kyōgoku's vision for the series, and several shots were directly based on his pieces.

The decision to create the series using CG came in part from how the beauty of gemstones was seen as part of the series' appeal, and how it would have been difficult to depict their translucency using hand-drawn animation, whereas CG enabled this; Kyōgoku had from the beginning envisioned the characters as figures with clear, moving parts. As Land of the Lustrous was Orange's first anime project as the main production studio, they spent a lot of time adjusting to the new series from the types of CG productions they were used to, balancing how detailed the CG work should be and figuring out how to achieve Kyōgoku's vision for the visual treatment of the characters. While Kyōgoku was happy with the final versions of the episodes, he said that it took much longer to create than had the series been created using 2D animation, saying that the first storyboards were not finished until June 2016 and that the first produced cuts took months to create, although the process started to go more smoothly once the first cuts were finished.

Nishikawa became involved in the production as Waki nominated him for the role as concept artist. Although Nishikawa had not been familiar with the source material previously, his wife was a fan of the manga, and he thought that he could be able to express himself through the background artwork due to how the manga does not use a lot of backgrounds. His concepts greatly influenced Kyōgoku's vision for what he wanted to accomplish with the series, with Kyōgoku specifically citing a piece showing a cel-shaded Phos with photo-realistic hair, behind CG grass, as influential. Many shots featured in the show were directly based on Nishikawa's pieces, including the framing and the shading used. He used triadic color schemes for his pieces, noting that the large amount of open spaces in the anime meant that the visuals would look flat if the color work was done incorrectly.

As Kyōgoku had worked with Nishida in the past, and she was a fan of the Land of the Lustrous manga, it was an easy decision to appoint her as the character designer. She designed a lot of reference artwork for the character proportions and facial expressions, creating a wide range of expressions despite Kyōgoku being unspecific in the instructions; this helped the production a lot, as the comedic sequences demanded a lot of different expressions and exaggerated faces. Translating the 2D character designs into 3D models was a very simple process due to how the characters all have about the same bodily proportions, allowing the artists to mostly focus on the characters' faces and hair.

Due to Orange's technical experience there were not a lot of technical problems with the production, although there were sometimes difficulties in reproducing the intended colors from the concept art in the 3D renderings. Cinnabar was also a difficult character to animate due to their subtle character acting and their finely detailed hair, and how they are surrounded by mercury. Orange had a lot of freedom in creating the action sequences, as Kyōgoku gave mostly vague directions for them, such as what general camera movement to use. To guide the 3D animation, 2D "guide animation" was produced; one animator working on these was Norio Matsumoto, known for his work on action sequences in the Naruto anime series.

== Release ==
Land of the Lustrous was announced in the magazine Monthly Afternoon in May 2017, and aired for twelve episodes on Japanese television on AT-X, Tokyo MX, BS11 and MBS from October 7 to December 23, 2017. Sentai Filmworks licensed the series and simulcast it through Amazon's Anime Strike platform in the United States; following the cancellation of Anime Strike in January 2018, it was transferred to the Amazon Prime Video service. The series was also simulcast through Hidive in the United Kingdom, Ireland, South Africa, Oceania, and Central and South America.

The series was released across six DVD and Blu-ray sets by Toho in Japan starting on December 22, 2017; the Japanese home video packaging was designed by the book design artist Tomoko Yamada as her first anime work, who modeled the packaging after jewelry boxes. Sentai Filmworks released the series on Blu-ray in a Steelbook case in North America on January 22, 2019. MVM Films acquired the series for distribution in the United Kingdom, with a release on Blu-ray on April 29, 2019. Sentai Filmworks produced English and Latin American Spanish dubs.

For the English release of the anime, series translator Deven Neel was instructed by the manga's creator, Haruko Ichikawa, to use gender-neutral pronouns for the characters, as Ichikawa wanted to portray them as genderless: the Japanese script uses a pronoun similar to "he", although noted by Neel as being more ambiguous, while the English translation uses singular "they".

The series' opening and ending themes were released separately on December 6, 2017, on CD, and the album Land of the Lustrous Sound Track Complete was released on January 17, 2018. An art exhibit featuring the production art from the series was held in Yūrakuchō, Tokyo from January 19 to February 25, 2018; it was originally intended to run until February 18, but was extended due to the popularity of it. The production art was also collected in the art book Houseki no Kuni Concept Arts, which was released on February 28, 2018. Other merchandise based on the show has also been released, including plush toys, pins, bags and mugs.

=== Episodes ===
No.	Title	Directed by	Written by	Original air date
1	"Phosphophyllite"; Transliteration: "Fosufofiraito" (Japanese: フォスフォフィライト)	Takahiko Kyōgoku	Toshiya Ono	October 7, 2017
The Lustrous, a life form of humanoid embodiments of gemstones, fights against the Lunarians, who seek to harvest them for jewellery on the moon. The Lustrous' master, Kongō, assigns one of the weaker jewels, Phos, to assemble a natural history since they are unsuited for battle. Struggling to find new information to include in it, Phos is recommended to seek out the nightwatch, a Lustrous named Cinnabar, whose body carries a powerful poison. As Phos is looking for them, Cinnabar shows up to protect Phos from Lunarians despite wanting to avoid battle due to how their poison damages the land. The next day, Phos once again comes across Cinnabar, objecting to their wishes to be taken away to the moon and vowing to find them something they can do.
2	"Diamond"; Transliteration: "Daiyamondo" (Japanese: ダイヤモンド)	Takahiko Kyōgoku	Toshiya Ono	October 14, 2017
Phos approaches Diamond for advice on what to add to the encyclopedia when another group of Lunarians appear. Diamond's sword is knocked away while trying to deflect the Lunarians' attack, but they are saved by another diamond-class Lustrous, Bort, who Diamond laments they can not surpass. As Bort scolds Diamond for putting themselves at risk, another Lunarian heads towards the school while Kongō is deep in meditation. Diamond follows Bort as they fight the Lunarians, and Phos is swallowed by a large snail creature, whose acidic form starts to melt away Phos's body.
3	"Metamorphos"; Transliteration: "Metamorufosu" (Japanese: メタモルフォス)	Kenji Mutō	Kazuyuki Fudeyasu	October 21, 2017
Detecting Phos inside the snail, Diamond finds a weak point in its shell, allowing Bort to defeat it. Discovering that Phos supposedly has transformed into a small slug creature, Diamond tries to find a way to turn them back to normal, but finds little help from the other Lustrous. They come across Cinnabar, who states that the slug is not actually Phos, but nonetheless gives Diamond a vital clue in saving Phos. The Lustrous managing to gather up pieces of Phos that were left behind in the snail's shell ultimately rebuilds Phos, who now is able to understand what the slug is saying.
4	"Soul - Flesh - Bone"; Transliteration: "Tamashii - Niku - Hone" (Japanese: 魂・肉・骨)	Shinichi Matsumi	Kazuyuki Fudeyasu	October 28, 2017
While conversing with the slug, who is revealed to be an Admirabilis named Ventricosus, Phos hears more about Cinnabar from Kongō. Hearing from Ventricosus that there is someone like them in their homeland, Phos decides to go under the sea, where Ventricosus transforms into a humanoid form. Ventricosus explains how humans once roamed the planet before evolving into three separate species representing flesh, bone, and soul: the Admirabilis, the Lustrous, and the Lunarians. Upon reaching their destination, Phos discovers that they had been led into a trap by Ventricosus, who wishes to give Phos to the Lunarians in exchange for her captured brother, Aculeatus.
5	"Return"; Transliteration: "Kikan" (Japanese: 帰還)	Takahiko Kyōgoku	Kazuyuki Fudeyasu	November 4, 2017
Despite having captured Phos, the Lunarians demand more Lustrous from Ventricosus, but Aculeatus manages to break free and beat the Lunarians. Aculeatus proposes that they use Phos for negotiations with the Lunarians, but Ventricosus convinces him to return Phos to the others. With their legs lost in the battle, along with some of their memories, Phos receives new legs made from agate shards that Ventricosus left with them. Despite losing their job writing the encyclopedia, Phos discovers that their new legs allow them to run at high speeds.
6	"First Battle"; Transliteration: "Uijin" (Japanese: 初陣)	Kenji Mutō	Toshiya Ono	November 11, 2017
Following another Lunarian battle, Yellow Diamond discovers that Phos is having trouble controlling their new legs. Theorizing that this speed is allegedly the result of Phos's hidden potential finally being unleashed, Kongō assigns Phos to join the twins Amethyst 84 and 33 on lookout duty, while also becoming perturbed when Phos vaguely recollects something concerning humans. While the first two days of lookout duty prove to be mentally exhausting, Lunarians appear on the third day, bringing with them a new type of Lunarian that ensnares the Amethysts and shatters them. As Kongō and the others arrive to defeat the Lunarians, Phos is confronted by Bort over what happened.
7	"Hibernation"; Transliteration: "Tōmin" (Japanese: 冬眠)	Shinichi Matsumi	Mio Inoue	November 18, 2017
While the other Lustrous undergo winter hibernation, Phos is unable to sleep and joins up with Antarcticite, who serves as the only Lustrous on duty during the winter. As the two cut down ice floes to keep the noise down, Phos hears voices coming from one of the floes, which lures Phos into the water and bites off their arms.
8	"Antarcticite"; Transliteration: "Antākuchisaito" (Japanese: アンタークチサイト)	Takahiko Kyōgoku	Mio Inoue	November 25, 2017
With Antarcticite unable to find Phos's missing arms, Kongō instructs them to go to the Chord Shore where Lustrous are born for replacement material. Phos is given a gold arm as an intended temporary replacement, but it starts to grow out of control and engulfs them just as more Lunarians appear. With Kongō held up by another group of Lunarians, Antarcticite is forced to fight alone against a rare Lunarian, only to be shattered by a surprise attack when their guard is dropped. Wanting to save them, Phos manages to will the gold to change shape and wield it as a weapon, but is ultimately unable to stop the Lunarians from escaping with Antarcticite.
9	"Spring"; Transliteration: "Haru" (Japanese: 春)	Shinichi Matsumi	Kazuyuki Fudeyasu	December 2, 2017
Phos is still tormented by the loss of Antarcticite as they spend the rest of the winter mastering the gold alloy running through their body. As spring arrives and the other Lustrous awaken from hibernation, Phos, who appears to be forgetting about Cinnabar, becomes the center of attention due to their gold arms, particular as they take down a group of Lunarians single-handedly.
10	"Shiro"; Transliteration: "Shiro" (Japanese: しろ)	Kenji Mutō	Kazuyuki Fudeyasu	December 9, 2017
Intrigued by Phos's new fighting ability, Bort asks them to become their partner in place of Diamond while Kongō is asleep. The next day, another new type of giant Lunarian appears, proving resilient to Bort and Phos's attacks. As Phos and Bort retreat and order the other Lustrous to hold their position, the Lunarian makes its way inside the school and starts chasing after Diamond. Feeling that they cannot rely on Bort to protect them, Diamond goes up against the Lunarian, using their diamond limbs to slice it. As Bort comes to Diamond's aid, they discover that the Lunarian has now split into two separate Lunarians.
11	"Secrets"; Transliteration: "Himitsu" (Japanese: 秘密)	Yōko Kuno	Kazuyuki Fudeyasu	December 16, 2017
The Lustrous discover that every time they slice through the Lunarians, it splits into increasingly smaller clones of itself, eventually winding up in tiny dog-like form. After almost all the smaller pieces are found and caged, the Lunarian reforms into its original size but is tamed by Kongō, who refers to it as "Shiro". As Phos ponders about the relationship between Kongo and Shiro, Cinnabar, who had come across Shiro's final piece, reveals that the others are aware that Kongō has an apparent relationship with the Lunarians that Kongō is keeping secret, but they still follow Kongō regardless. After Shiro regains all its pieces and disappears after finding peace, Phos helps Rutile find ruby fragments to successfully restore Padparadscha, a Lustrous who has laid dormant due to the holes they were born with.
12	"New Work"; Transliteration: "Atarashī Shigoto" (Japanese: 新しい仕事)	Takahiko Kyōgoku	Kazuyuki Fudeyasu	December 23, 2017
Asked about how to talk to the Lunarians, Padparadscha gives Phos cryptic advice before falling into slumber again. The next day, Bort tests Zircon as their next partner while Phos learns more about Lunarians from Alexandrite, who holds their own agenda against them. When Lunarians appear, Phos attempts to interrogate one of them, but is unable to get anything useful out of it before Cinnabar shows up to destroy them. Remembering their promise to find Cinnabar a new job, Phos asks for their help in finding out the truth concerning Kongō and the Lunarians.

== Reception ==
=== Critical reception ===
Land of the Lustrous was positively received by critics, (Note: See AniWay, The Japan Times, Anime News Network, and Otaku USA) and called among the best anime of the season and of the decade, and one of the most inventive and fresh anime in years. The story and characters were praised by critics, who called them unique and relatable, with engrossing, likable characters and an intriguing world, and succeeding both at internal and external struggles.

Michelle Villanueva of Syfy stated that the gems are portrayed as non-binary, noting the relationship between Phosphophyllite "Phos" and Cinnabar, with Rutile having deep feelings for Padparadscha, saying that both have feelings for each other. She added that while the series isn't perfect in terms of "queer representation" as the gems are thin-limbed and shiny, with all the gems voiced by "cis female actors, hopefully that it is a "daring stepping stone on the road to queer representation," which will lead to more "queer-themed mainstream anime and manga." Villanueva noted this because when the anime was released in English, series translator Deven Neel was instructed by the manga's creator, Haruko Ichikawa, to use gender-neutral pronouns for the characters, as Ichikawa wanted to portray them as genderless: the Japanese script uses a pronoun similar to "he", although noted by Neel as being more ambiguous, while the English translation uses singular "they".

The series was well received for its visuals and use of CG; (Note: See AniWay, The Japan Times, Anime News Network, Otaku USA, and The Fandom Post) although some critics were initially unsure about its look, it was later praised as a turning point for CG anime and something even skeptics of CG anime would enjoy, with Otaku USA calling it Orange's best visual work and one of the best-looking TV anime in recent memory. The animation itself was also well received, with character posing, timing and acting described as unusually good for CG anime, particularly Phos's animation in combination with Kurosawa's voice performance. Anime News Network and the Japanese publication Animate Times enjoyed the prominent action sequences in the series, and Otaku USA liked how those sequences took advantage of the CG production, making use of dynamic camerawork that would not have been as feasible in a fully 2D production. They also liked the implementation of supplementary 2D elements, such as facial animations and close up, and how they were integrated into the larger 3D production. The art direction was similarly well received, and was described as a good conversion of both the original manga's atmosphere and of Nishikawa's concept art. Otaku USA liked the Lustrous' character designs, but particularly liked how the Lunarians were designed and arranged like serene, divine and inscrutable Buddhist processions, which helped in making them more menacing.

=== Accolades ===
The series won VFX-Japan Awards 2018 "Excellence" and "Best" awards in the "Television Anime CG" category, and was nominated for the 2017 CG World Awards in the "Best Work in CG Animation" category; CG World also nominated Orange for the "Grand Prix" category, for their work on action sequences, facial expressions and character presentation within Land of the Lustrous. The series won the 2nd Crunchyroll Anime Awards in the "Best CGI" category in 2017, and was nominated for "Anime of the Year", "Best Action", and "Best Animation"; the series' composer Yoshiaki Fujisawa and its ending theme "Kirameku Hamabe" by Yuiko Ōhara were also nominated for "Best Score" and "Best Ending" categories, respectively. The series won the 4th Anime Trending Awards in the "Best in Sceneries and Visuals" category, and was nominated for their "Best in Adaptation", "Best in Soundtrack", "Best in Character Design", "Best in Animation Effects and Sequence", "Action or Adventure Anime of the Year" and "Fantasy or Magical Anime of the Year" categories.

Polygon named the series as one of the best anime of the 2010s, and Crunchyroll listed it in their "Top 100 best anime of the 2010s". IGN also listed the series among the best anime series of the 2010s. Lauren Orsini of Forbes included Land of the Lustrous on her list of the best anime of the decade. The series was also included in multiple Anime News Network writers' individual lists of the best anime of the season, and in the publication's 2018 feature about "visually striking anime productions".

=== Sales ===
The first two Japanese DVD volumes sold around 900 copies each, ranking sixteenth and fifth on the weekly Japanese DVD charts, the third sold around 800 copies, ranking eighth, and the fourth and fifth sold around 700, ranking sixth and ninth. The first five Japanese Blu-ray volumes all sold around 5,000 copies each, ranking sixth, first, first, second and second on the Blu-ray charts. (Note: Volume 1, 2, 3, 4, and 5)

== See also ==
- Steven Universe, a 2013–2019 American animated series with a similar theme involving gems
