= Egg Firm =

Japanese production company

Egg Firm, Inc.
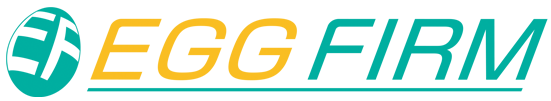
- Native name: 株式会社EGG FIRM
- Romanized name: Kabushiki-gaisha Eggu Fāmu
- Type: Kabushiki gaisha
- Industry: Anime
- Founded: March 10, 2015; 11 years ago
- Founder: Nobuhiro Osawa
- Headquarters: Honchō, Nakano, Tokyo, Japan
- Key people: Nobuhiro Osawa (CEO); Yoshimi Nakajima (Director); Kazuma Miki (Outside director)
- Total equity: ¥ 31,500,000
- Parent: Aniplex (2026–present)
- Subsidiaries: Studio Bind (joint venture with White Fox)
- Website: www.eggfirm.com

Egg Firm, Inc. (Japanese: 株式会社EGG FIRM, Hepburn: Eggu Fāmu) is a Japanese company with its business focused on production, planning and management for anime. It is a wholly owned subsidiary of Aniplex.

== History ==
The company was founded by ex-Genco producer Nobuhiro Osawa on March 10, 2015, with the objective of being a production and planning company for anime.

In July 2016, the company announced that it was collaborating with light novel author Reki Kawahara, anime scriptwriter Ichiro Okouchi, and anime director Akiyuki Shinbo to expand the company business for planning, production and animating anime projects. It also joined forces with Straight Edge of Kazuma Miki, Kadokawa's former Dengeki Bunko Editor-in-Chief. Due to the collaboration, Kawahara, Okouchi, and Shinbo all became shareholders of Egg Firm.

In February 2026, Aniplex acquired Egg Firm as a wholly owned subsidiary.

== Works ==
=== Television series ===
- Is It Wrong to Try to Pick Up Girls in a Dungeon? (2015–2023) – Production Cooperation
- Gate (2015) – Production Cooperation
- Shimoneta (2015) – Production Cooperation
- Prison School (2015) – Production Cooperation
- The Disastrous Life of Saiki K. (2016–2019) – Production
- Schoolgirl Strikers: Animation Channel (2017) – Production
- Rin-ne (2017) – Production Cooperation
- Is It Wrong to Try to Pick Up Girls in a Dungeon? On the Side: Sword Oratoria (2017) – Production Cooperation
- Knight's & Magic (2017) – Production Cooperation
- UQ Holder! (2017) – Production
- Kino's Journey —the Beautiful World— the Animated Series (2017) – Production
- Konohana Kitan (2017) – Production Cooperation
- Last Period (2018) – Production
- Sword Art Online Alternative: Gun Gale Online (2018–2024) – Production
- Sword Art Online: Alicization (2018–2020) – Production
- Endro! (2019) – Production
- No Guns Life (2019–2020) – Production
- Kandagawa Jet Girls (2019) – Production
- Obake Zukan (2020–2023) – Production
- Mushoku Tensei: Jobless Reincarnation (2021–present) – Production
- Rumble Garanndoll (2021) – Production
- The Executioner and Her Way of Life (2022) – Production
- Immoral Guild (2022) – Production
- Onimai: I'm Now Your Sister! (2023) – Production
- My Love Story with Yamada-kun at Lv999 (2023) – Production
- World Dai Star (2023) – Production
- I Got Married to the Girl I Hate Most in Class (2025) – Production
- Ruri Rocks (2025) – Production
- Uglymug, Epicfighter (2025) – Production
- Overgeared (2026) – Production

=== Films ===
- Accel World: Infinite Burst (2016) – Production Cooperation
- Sword Art Online the Movie: Ordinal Scale (2017) – Production Cooperation
- Is It Wrong to Try to Pick Up Girls in a Dungeon?: Arrow of the Orion (2019) – Production
- Sword Art Online Progressive: Aria of a Starless Night (2021) – Production
- Sword Art Online Progressive: Scherzo of Deep Night (2022) – Production

=== Other ===
- Seishun Buta Yarō wa Bunny Girl Senpai no Yume o Minai with Sakura-sō no Pet na Kanojo (2016; tasūketsu drama) – Production
- Last Period (2016; video game) – Opening Animation Production
- Kino's Journey (2016; tasūketsu drama) – Production
- Triple Monsters (2018; video game) – Planning Cooperation
