= Studio Bind =

Japanese animation studio

Studio Bind, Inc.
- Native name: 株式会社スタジオバインド
- Romanized name: Kabushiki-gaisha Sutajio Baindo
- Type: Kabushiki gaisha
- Industry: Japanese animation
- Founded: November 2018; 7 years ago
- Headquarters: Ogikubo, Suginami, Tokyo, Japan
- Key people: Toshiya Otomo (president)
- Total equity: ¥ 5,000,000
- Owner: Egg Firm; White Fox
- Website: st-bind.jp

Studio Bind, Inc. (Japanese: 株式会社スタジオバインド, Hepburn: Kabushiki-gaisha Sutajio Baindo), is a Japanese animation studio founded in November 2018 as a joint venture by Egg Firm and White Fox. It is best known for the adaptation of the light novel series Mushoku Tensei.

== History ==
The company was founded in November 2018 as a joint venture between animation studio White Fox and production, planning and management company Egg Firm. The first work of the studio was on the anime Karakuri Circus for the episodes 22 and 31, while the first work of the company as a lead animation studio is Mushoku Tensei, which debuted in 2021.

On January 31, 2021, Egg Firm CEO and Mushoku Tensei chief producer Nobuhiro Osawa stated that he built the new production studio for Mushoku Tensei. In October 2019, production company Egg Firm explained their rationale for setting up a separate studio from the existing White Fox studio, stating they "needed a system that would allow us to move forward with the project in a continuous, long-term, and systematic manner" so they "will be able to concentrate more on the production of Mushoku Tensei." Egg Firm noted that "Studio Bind will use Mushoku Tensei as a launchpad for its full-scale animation production business."

== Works ==
=== Television series ===
Title	Director(s)	First run start date	First run end date	Eps	Note(s)	Ref(s)
Mushoku Tensei	Manabu Okamoto	January 11, 2021	December 20, 2021	23	Based on a light novel series written by Rifujin na Magonote and illustrated by Shirotaka.	
Onimai: I'm Now Your Sister!	Shingo Fujii	January 5, 2023	March 23, 2023	12	Based on a manga series written and illustrated by Nekotofu.	
Mushoku Tensei II	Hiroki Hirano (part 1); Ryōsuke Shibuya (part 2)	July 3, 2023	July 1, 2024	25	Sequel to Mushoku Tensei.	
Flower and Asura	Ayumu Uwano	January 7, 2025	March 26, 2025	12	Based on a manga series written by Ayano Takeda and illustrated by Musshu.	
Ruri Rocks	Shingo Fujii	July 6, 2025	September 21, 2025	13	Based on a manga series written and illustrated by Keiichirō Shibuya.	
Mushoku Tensei III	Ryōsuke Shibuya	July 4, 2026	TBA	TBA	Sequel to Mushoku Tensei II.	

=== OVAs ===
Title	Director(s)	Release date	Eps	Note(s)	Ref(s)
Mushoku Tensei: Eris the Goblin Slayer	Manabu Okamoto	March 16, 2022	1	Based on a light novel series written by Rifujin na Magonote and illustrated by Shirotaka.	
