= Onimai =

Japanese manga series

- Onimai: I'm Now Your Sister!
- Cover of the first volume featuring Mahiro Oyama

お兄ちゃんはおしまい! (Onii-chan wa Oshimai!)
- Genre: Comedy, slice of life
- Manga
- Written by: Nekotofu
- Published by: Ichijinsha
- English publisher: NA: Kodansha USA (digital)
- Magazine: Monthly Comic Rex (April 27, 2019–present)
- Original run: February 25, 2017 – present
- Volumes: 11
- Anime television series
- Directed by: Shingo Fujii
- Produced by: Takurou Hatakeyama; Mitsuteru Hishiyama
- Written by: Michiko Yokote
- Music by: Daisuke Achiba; Alisa Okehazama
- Studio: Studio Bind
- Licensed by: Crunchyroll; SEA: Medialink
- Original network: AT-X, Tokyo MX, BS11
- Original run: January 5, 2023 – March 23, 2023
- Episodes: 12
- icon

Onimai: I'm Now Your Sister! (Japanese: お兄ちゃんはおしまい!, Hepburn: Onii-chan wa Oshimai!; lit. 'Older Brother Is Done For!') (Note: "Oshimai" written phonetically to have a double meaning of お終い "done for" and お姉妹 "sister") is a Japanese manga series written and illustrated by Nekotofu. The series has been serialized online since 2017; it is also currently serialized in Ichijinsha's Monthly Comic Rex magazine since April 2019. It is licensed in English by Kodansha USA. An anime television series adaptation by Studio Bind aired from January to March 2023 with high ratings.

== Plot ==
The series follows Mahiro Oyama, an otaku and NEET who lives alone with his scientist younger sister Mihari. One day he wakes up to find himself transformed into a young girl, a result of one of Mihari's experiments. Mahiro must now learn to become comfortable in his new body whilst living life as a middle school girl.

== Characters ==
Mahiro Oyama (緒山 真尋, Oyama Mahiro) (Note: As a girl, Mahiro's name is written as 緒山 まひろ, spelled phonetically in hiragana.)
Voiced by: Marika Kōno
The protagonist of the series, Mahiro was previously an otaku man living with her younger sister Mihari until she was turned into a girl as a result of one of her experiments. Mahiro ends up transferring to a middle school. Mahiro is fond of playing video games and mainly stayed at home before being turned into a girl.
Mihari Oyama (緒山 みはり, Oyama Mihari)
Voiced by: Kaori Ishihara
Mahiro's younger sister and a scientist. She turned Mahiro into a girl as a result of one of her experiments. Due to her high intelligence, she skipped several grades and is now a university student. Although she has yet to finish her university studies, she is called "Professor" by Asahi.
Kaede Hozuki (穂月 かえで, Hozuki Kaede)
Voiced by: Hisako Kanemoto
Mihari's classmate during middle school and a gyaru. She is Momiji's older sister. She is good at cooking and using cosmetics. She also works part-time at a fast food restaurant.
Momiji Hozuki (穂月 もみじ, Hozuki Momiji)
Voiced by: Minami Tsuda
Kaede's younger sister and Mahiro's classmate. She has a tomboyish personality and greatly admires Mahiro. She has been friends with Asahi for several years.
Asahi Ōka (桜花 朝日, Ōka Asahi) (Note: Her given name is usually written in hiragana (あさひ) in the series.)
Voiced by: Kana Yūki
Mahiro's classmate. She has an energetic personality but tends to not perform well in tests. She also calls Mahiro by many nicknames.
Miyo Murosaki (室崎 美夜, Murosaki Miyo) (Note: Her given name is usually written in hiragana (みよ) in the series.)
Voiced by: Natsumi Hioka
Mahiro's classmate. She is interested in yuri and tries to hide it poorly. She enjoys imagining her friends in romantic situations. Miyo is notably bustier than her classmates and embarrassed about it.
Nayuta Tenkawa (天川 那由多, Tenkawa Nayuta) (Note: Her given name is usually written in hiragana (なゆた) in the series.)
Mahiro's classmate who joins during the cast's second year of middle school. She is a bright, yet shy girl who is the ward of Mihari's faculty advisor Chitose Azuma, who is having her monitor Mahiro without Mihari's knowledge. After revealing to Mahiro that she knows the truth about her, she is quickly accepted into Mahiro's group of friends. She is very knowledgeable due to the many hours she spent in the university library, and speaks in a very polite tone with everyone she encounters.
Chitose Azuma (吾妻 ちとせ, Azuma Chitose)
Voiced by: Mayu Mashiro (drama CD)
Mihari's faculty advisor and senpai at the university Mihari attends, as well as Nayuta's guardian. She made key contributions that allowed for the creation of the drug that turned Mahiro into a girl. Although Mihari believes that she did this out of the goodness of her heart, she is actually using Mihari to fulfill an unknown agenda and enrolled Nayuta into the same class as Mahiro to spy on her without Mihari's knowledge.

== Production ==
Prior to creating the series, Onimai's author, Nekotofu, was a fan of the "gender bender" genre of anime and manga that included such works as Ranma ½, Kashimashi: Girl Meets Girl, and Idol Pretender. As such, Nekotofu had harbored a longtime interest in creating his own such series, and was inspired to do so after seeing Your Name. He was also motivated by the positive response to a doujinshi he had created which also featured similar gender-bending elements. Nekotofu began self-publishing Onimai on Pixiv in January 2017, and later on Niconico Seiga, where it became significantly more popular. In April 2019, the manga began serialization in Ichijinsha's Monthly Comic Rex magazine. Nekotofu continues to self-publish the series online and produce doujinshi with permission from Ichijinsha.

== Media ==
=== Manga ===
Written and illustrated by Nekotofu, Onimai: I'm Now Your Sister! began serialization online via Pixiv and other platforms in 2017. It also started in Ichijinsha's Monthly Comic Rex magazine on April 27, 2019. As of May 2026, eleven tankōbon volumes have been released by Ichijinsha. In North America, Kodansha USA is publishing the series digitally in English.

==== Volumes ====
No.	Original release date	Original ISBN	English release date	English ISBN
1	June 27, 2018	978-4-7580-6750-8	August 31, 2021	978-1-63-699336-2
2	January 26, 2019	978-4-7580-6792-8	October 5, 2021	978-1-63-699337-9
3	September 27, 2019	978-4-7580-6828-4	November 30, 2021	978-1-63-699373-7
4	July 27, 2020	978-4-7580-6883-3	January 25, 2022	978-1-63-699431-4
5	May 27, 2021	978-4-7580-6917-5	March 22, 2022	978-1-63-699481-9
6	April 27, 2022	978-4-7580-6977-9	October 25, 2022	978-1-68-491505-7
7	January 7, 2023	978-4-7580-8400-0; 978-4-7580-8401-7 (SE)	July 25, 2023	979-8-88-933052-3
8	November 27, 2023	978-4-7580-8456-7; 978-4-7580-8457-4 (SE)	June 18, 2024	979-8-88-933498-9
9	September 27, 2024	978-4-7580-8582-3; 978-4-7580-8583-0 (SE)	April 22, 2025	979-8-89-478515-8
10	July 26, 2025	978-4-7580-8756-8; 978-4-7580-8757-5 (SE)	January 27, 2026	979-8-89-478844-9
11	May 27, 2026	978-4-7580-9908-0; 978-4-7580-9909-7 (SE)	November 10, 2026	979-8-89-830207-8

=== Anime ===
An anime television series adaptation was announced on April 22, 2022. It is produced by Studio Bind and chief directed by Shingo Fujii, with Michiko Yokote as head writer, character designs handled by Ryo Imamura, and music composed by Daisuke Achiba and Alisa Okehazama. The series aired from January 5 to March 23, 2023, on AT-X and other networks. The opening theme song is "Identeitei Meltdown" (アイデン貞貞メルトダウン) by Enako feat. P Maru-sama, while the ending theme song is "Himegoto*Crisisters" (ひめごと＊クライシスターズ) by Marika Kōno, Kaori Ishihara, Hisako Kanemoto, and Minami Tsuda. Crunchyroll streamed the series. Medialink has licensed the series in Asia-Pacific.

==== Episodes ====
No.	Title	Directed by	Written by	Storyboard by	Original release date
1	"Mahiro's Confusing New Body" (lit. 'Mahiro and the body that can't get off'); Transliteration: "Mahiro to Ikenai Karada" (Japanese: まひろとイケないカラダ)	Shingo Fujii	Michiko Yokote	Shingo Fujii	January 5, 2023
Mahiro Oyama is a hikikomori living with his grade-skipping wunderkind little sister Mihari who is a researcher. One day he wakes up as a young girl after being drugged by Mihari, as a part of her Big Brother Rehabilitation project. She forces him to take a shower and wear feminine clothes upon a health checkup. Seeing him obsess over his newfound interest in a yaoi visual novel, she takes him out for a jog and buys him a new bra; he refused to have one on for the jog in an attempt to hang onto his ever-decreasing masculinity.
2	"Mahiro's Time of the Month" (lit. 'Mahiro and the girl's day') (Note: "girl's day" (女の子の日) is a euphemism for menstrual day); Transliteration: "Mahiro to Onnanoko no Hi" (Japanese: まひろと女の子の日)	Eri Irei	Michiko Yokote	Eri Irei	January 12, 2023
The water heater is broken for the night, so Mihari and Mahiro visit a public bath, where the former teaches him about hair care; quickly exhausted, he leaves to reminisce about the time when he was the one helping his little sibling bathe. Upon finishing breakfast, Mahiro naturally tries out new hairstyles, which Mihari records for her research. As nearly one month passes since start of the transition, Mahiro has his first menstruation and Mihari takes care of him.
3	"Mahiro's Close Encounter" (lit. 'Mahiro and the encounter with the unknown'); Transliteration: "Mahiro to Michi to no Sōgū" (Japanese: まひろと未知との遭遇)	Yasuhiko Akiyama	Miharu Hirami	Yasuhiko Akiyama	January 19, 2023
Mahiro meets Kaede Hozuki, a gyaru and friend of Mihari, who cooks him lunch and puts make-up on him. In a shopping mall, the three buy new clothes before watching a film—in the middle of which, Mahiro runs to the bathroom but urinates himself before he reaches it. Kaede helps him clean up and buys him new panties. Mihari catches a cold from the movie theater, so Mahiro does the housework, incompetently.
4	"Mahiro's New Friend" (lit. 'Mahiro and new friends'); Transliteration: "Mahiro to Atarashii Tomodachi" (Japanese: まひろとあたらしい友達)	Hayato Kakinokida	Michiko Yokote	Hayato Kakinokida	January 26, 2023
Mihari catches Mahiro mimicking an anime magical girl character before departing for campus, leaving him to laze around until morning. Mahiro loses in a video game match against Mihari and thus shops for groceries, where he befriends Momiji, Kaede's tomboyish middle school sister. Days after, Mahiro swiftly tidies up his room when he sees the two sisters come over; however, he accidentally knocks over his hentai manga collection in front of Momiji.
5	"Mahiro Discovers Adventure and Social Gatherings" (lit. 'Mahiro and guidance and invitations'); Transliteration: "Mahiro to Hodō to Osasoi to" (Japanese: まひろと補導とお誘いと)	Yukihiro Komawo	Michiko Yokote	Tomomi Mochizuki	February 2, 2023
Mahiro voluntarily goes outside to buy himself anime-imprint folders and gets caught by a truant officer at an arcade; he escapes the traumatic encounter and a worried Mihari thinks of initiating her plan B. Mihari takes him to a hair salon for a new style, where he is overloaded by small talks. The Oyamas and Hozukis plan a trip to an onsen while having a dinner at the latter's residence.
6	"Mahiro Goes Back to Middle School" (lit. 'Mahiro and a second time as a middle schooler'); Transliteration: "Mahiro to Nidome no Chūgakusei" (Japanese: まひろと二度目の中学生)	Nobuyoshi Arai	Miharu Hirami	Nobuyoshi Arai	February 9, 2023
Mahiro gets to know Momiji's friends Asahi and Miyo, and learns that he has been enrolled in middle school in the same class as them, which helps his social anxiety in the first days. Still not fully integrated into his new body, he makes mistakes such as using the boys' restroom and changing clothes in the classroom. Miyo tells the teacher that Mahiro is having menstrual cramps, and as a result he does not need to run a race in physical education.
7	"Mahiro's Role-Playing Game" (lit. 'Mahiro and role-play'); Transliteration: "Mahiro to Rōrupurei" (Japanese: まひろとロールプレイ)	Ayumu Uwano	Miharu Hirami	Ayumu Uwano	February 16, 2023
Despite studying at least a week prior, Mahiro faces difficulties in the final examinations; in addition, he sleeps through the mathematics phase, one of the only subjects he is good at. He talks with two male classmates who share the same interests in a video game series, but quickly becomes depressed realizing that the installment he plays had been released before they were born. In home economics, Mahiro and his friends bake black tea cookies, the recipe of which is taught to him and Momiji by Kaede.
8	"Mahiro's First Girls Sleepover" (lit. 'Mahiro and a first all-female gathering'); Transliteration: "Mahiro to Hajimete no Joshikai" (Japanese: まひろとはじめての女子会)	Hironori Tanaka	Michiko Yokote	Hironori Tanaka	February 23, 2023
During winter break, Mihari secretly invites Mahiro's friends to a sleepover. They play a video game together and take a bath. Mahiro with Mihari, along with Momiji her friends, reminisce about their pasts. A game of rock-paper-scissors escalates into a pillow fight. Asahi tells everyone a horror story before falling asleep with Mahiro's comforter; as he slides over to Momiji, she mistakes him for a monster and urinates in her futon. Mahiro washes it and takes the blame for it the next morning.
9	"Mahiro Rings in the New Year" (lit. 'Mahiro and year-end holidays'); Transliteration: "Mahiro to Nenmatsu Nenshi" (Japanese: まひろと年末年始)	Yasuhiko Akiyama	Michiko Yokote	Mamoru Kurosawa	March 2, 2023
Mihari and Kaede catch their younger siblings stalking them at a Christmas market and decide to spend quality time together. Mihari forces him to visit a shrine to ring in the New Year and offer prayers with them, joined by Asahi and Miyo. Kaede takes them all back home for dinner and lets Mihari try amazake for the first time; after a single drink she becomes heavily intoxicated and shows everyone strong romantic affections.
10	"Mahiro Ponders Boobs and Identity" (lit. 'Mahiro and boobs and identity'); Transliteration: "Mahiro to Oppai to Aidentiti" (Japanese: まひろとおっぱいとアイデンティティ)	Aose Sakaguchi	Miharu Hirami	Aose Sakaguchi	March 9, 2023
On the first day of school after the break, Mahiro and his colleagues discuss fashion during the cold months. Kaede takes tutoring lessons from Mihari and, as a reward, massages her and Mahiro. On Valentine's Day, he trades chocolate bars for miscellaneous sweets with his classmates, buying an additional one for his sister in the evening. He catches the two male classmates attempting to sneak into the adults-only section of a bookstore before encountering the yuri-affectionate Miyo. The girls share a meal of crêpes together.
11	"Mahiro Pretties Up" (lit. 'Mahiro and girls' tastes'); Transliteration: "Mahiro to Joshi no Tashinami" (Japanese: まひろと女子のたしなみ)	Shinji Nagata & Yukihiro Komawo	Miharu Hirami	Shinji Nagata	March 16, 2023
The class talks about a trendy book about astrology, a topic which Mihari despises. In an attempt by a chūnibyō Momiji—who believes in astrology—to get Mahiro's birth date, he realizes it is on the current day. His friends surprise him with a party the next day and give him presents, one of which is a lipstick from Kaede. He wears it to school, which gets the class' attention as it is against the rules. At home, Kaede dresses up the Oyama siblings with gyaru-style clothing.
12	"Mahiro's Future as a Sister" (lit. 'Mahiro's ending and future'); Transliteration: "Mahiro no Oshimai to Kore kara" (Japanese: まひろのおしまいとこれから)	Shingo Fujii	Michiko Yokote	Shingo Fujii	March 23, 2023
As planned, they stay at an onsen together with Asahi and Miyo for one night. In the middle of playing with his friends at the pool, Mahiro's drug slowly wears off and his penis grows back. Without anyone noticing it, he storms back to the hotel room with Mihari who presents him with a backup potion, telling him to consider that it will make him stay female for "a long time" if taken. After taking the evening's time to reflect on it, he decides to drink it. On the way home by train, Mihari reveals to him that her conspiring rehabilitation project has been overly successful.

== Reception ==
=== Accolades ===
Onimai: I'm Now Your Sister! ranked fifth in Da Vinci's Next Manga Award 2018 in the web manga category in August 2018, and ranked ninth in Web Manga Overall Election 2019 in October 2019. The manga also ranked third in AnimeJapan's Manga We Want to See Animated Ranking in 2020, and ranked seventh in 2021.

=== Critical reception ===
The series received positive reviews and was ranked by viewers in Japan as the top-rated TV anime of the Winter 2023 season on both Niconico and anime ranking website Anikore.jp. One Japanese-language reviewer, writing for 4Gamer.net, echoed positive sentiments regarding its music and art style. Shoki Ota, writing for KAI-YOU, said the series was remarkable for its meticulous depiction of everyday life, and said, "While it might not be for everyone due to its gender swap themes, it feels like a condensed work amid the recent 'anime festival', making it a must-see this season".

In early English-language coverage of the series, the critical response to Onimai's first few episodes were mixed despite the high user ratings. Some reviewers criticized the first episode's premise and lolicon themes, and perceived incestuous overtones, while praising the animation and music, which was near-universally deemed to be of exceptional quality. Rebecca Silverman was softer in her criticisms, describing the fan service as "relatively toned down" but stated that the narrative premise was too "mean" for her to enjoy and squandering its potential.

Kim Morrissy, reviewing the anime for Anime News Network, was more positive, saying "Onimai is the best anime of the season." Morrissy strongly praised the narrative, humor, art, and animation production, particularly the work of series director Shingo Fujii, who previously worked on Precure. Sakugablog also mentioned Onimai multiple times in their Sakugabooru Animation Awards 2023 for Best Show, Best Animation Design, and other categories but did not give it any awards.

=== Popularity ===
In February 2023, fans of Onimai sent numerous gifts to the staff of Studio Bind, the production studio of the anime, which series director Shingo Fujii posted photos of in a tweet voicing thanks for the support.
