= Yuiko Ōhara =

Japanese singer and songwriter

Yuiko Ōhara 大原 ゆい子
- Born: Yuiko Ōhara (大原 由衣子, Ōhara Yuiko); February 5, 1992 (age 34); Chiba Prefecture, Japan
- Genres: Anison
- Years active: 2012–present
- Label: Toho Animation Records
- Website: http://yuiko-ohara.com

Yuiko Ōhara (大原 ゆい子, Ōhara Yuiko; born February 5, 1992) is a Japanese singer and songwriter from Chiba Prefecture who is affiliated with Toho Animation Records. Starting her career as a live performer in 2012, she would also participate in several auditions and competitions. She made her major debut in 2015 with the song "Magic Parade", which was used as the theme song to the short film Little Witch Academia: The Enchanted Parade. Apart from Little Witch Academia, her music has also been featured in anime series such as Land of the Lustrous, Teasing Master Takagi-san, Hanebado!, and Mushoku Tensei: Jobless Reincarnation.

== Biography ==
Ōhara was born in Chiba Prefecture on February 5, 1992. She had an interest in music since she was at least three years old, when her mother enrolled her in a music class. While in elementary, she became a member of her school's orchestra club, where she played the violin. In junior high school, she learned to play the guitar after being inspired by the music of artists such as Spitz and Yui. Her parents initially thought it would be better for her to enter university and pursue a profession, but later on would support her decision to enroll in a music vocational school.

In 2012, Ōhara began performing at live venues in Tokyo. She also began participating in various auditions and music competitions. In 2012, she was a finalist in an audition held by Sony and Lotte. She was also a finalist in the 2014 iteration of the Miss iD idol audition sponsored by Kodansha. Her major music break came in 2015, after passing an audition held by Toho Animation Records to perform the theme song for the anime short film Little Witch Academia: The Enchanted Parade. That song, "Magic Parade", would be released as her major debut single on October 7, 2015.

Ōhara's second single "Hoshi o Tadoreba" (星を辿れば; "If You Follow the Stars") was released on February 22, 2017; its title track is used as the first ending theme to the Little Witch Academia anime television series. Her third single "Tōmei na Tsubasa" (透明な翼; "Transparent Wings") was released on May 24, 2017; its title track is used as the second ending theme to Little Witch Academia. Her fourth single "Kirameku Hamabe" (煌めく浜辺; "Glittering Shore") was released on December 6, 2017; the title track is used as the ending theme to the anime series Land of the Lustrous. "Kirameku Hamabe" was also released as a mini-album on the same day.

Ōhara released her fifth single "Iwanaikedo ne." (言わないけどね。; "Do Not Say That.") on February 14, 2018; the song is used as the opening theme to the anime series Teasing Master Takagi-san and was covered by Rie Takahashi as an ending theme for the show's second season. Her sixth single "High Stepper" (ハイステッパー) was released on August 15, 2018; the title track is used as the ending theme to the anime series Hanebado!.

In July 2018, it was announced that Ōhara had been chosen to serve as a brand ambassador of the Baseball Challenge League and would also perform the league's official support song.

In 2021, she began performing opening and ending themes for the anime television series Mushoku Tensei: Jobless Reincarnation; the songs were released in a compilation album on December 22, 2021. In 2023, it was announced that Ōhara had been married for a number of years and would be going on hiatus due to pregnancy.

== Discography ==
=== Singles ===
Title	Peak Oricon rank
"Magic Parade": Release date: October 7, 2015	—
"Hoshi o Tadoreba" (星を辿れば; "If You Follow the Stars"): Release date: February 22, 2017	71
"Tōmei na Tsubasa" (透明な翼; "Transparent Wings"): Release date: May 24, 2017	80
"Kirameku Hamabe" (煌めく浜辺; "Glittering Shore"): Release date: December 6, 2017	69
"Iwanaikedo ne." (言わないけどね。; "Do Not Say That."): Release date: February 14, 2018	43
"High Stepper" (ハイステッパー): Release date: August 15, 2018	61
"Egao no Mahou" (えがおのまほう; "The Magic of Smile"): Release date: April 24, 2019	—
"Zero Centimeter" (ゼロセンチメートル): Release date: July 17, 2019	55

=== Mini-albums ===
Title	Peak Oricon rank
"Kirameku Hamabe" (煌めく浜辺, Glittering Shore): Release date: December 6, 2017	—
"TV Anime "Mushoku Tensei: Isekai Ittara Honki desu" Theme Song Collection" (TVアニメ『無職転生 ～異世界行ったら本気だす～』Theme Song Collection, TV Anime "Jobless Reincarnation: I Will Seriously Try If I Go to Another World" Theme Song Collection): Release date: December 22, 2021	34
"Island Memories": Release date: July 13, 2022	85

=== Albums ===
Title	Peak Oricon rank
"Hoshi ni Namae wo Tsukeru Toki" (星に名前をつけるとき, When Naming The Stars): Release date: September 25, 2019	37
