= List of Mushoku Tensei volumes =

Mushoku Tensei is a Japanese light novel series written by Rifujin na Magonote. (Note: Japanese: 理不尽な孫の手, Hepburn: Rifujin na Magonote; lit. "Unreasonable Backscratcher") Originally published on the internet web novel site Shōsetsuka ni Narō since November 22, 2012.

In November 2013, the author announced his work was to be released as a light novel under Media Factory's MF Books imprint; regardless, the author stated his intentions to continue publishing his chapters online. The illustrator for the light novel is a Pixiv user called Shirotaka. (Note: シロタカ, Shiro Taka; lit. "White Hawk") Seven Seas Entertainment has licensed the light novels for publication in North America. Seven Seas made changes in their translations of the light novels such as toning down Rudeus's perverted behavior and removing references to rape.

A manga adaptation by Yuka Fujikawa began serialization in the June 2014 issue of Monthly Comic Flapper. Seven Seas Entertainment also licensed the tankōbon volumes of the manga for localization in North America.

== Web novel ==
Volume no.	Title	Web novel release date
1	Childhood (幼年期, Yōnen-ki)	November 22 – December 2, 2012
A 34-year-old NEET is kicked out of his home following the death of his parents. He comes upon a speeding truck heading towards a group of teenagers, and manages to pull one of them out of the way before dying. He then awakens in a baby's body and realizes he has been reincarnated in a world of sword and sorcery. While initially indulging in his perversion, he resolves to become successful in his new life, discarding his past identity aside for his new life as Rudeus Greyrat. At the age of three, Rudeus teaches himself magic arts and begins training to increase his mana capacity. Discovering his talent in magic, his parents hire a girl named Roxy Migurdia to be a live-in teacher. During his two years with Roxy, Rudeus learns more about the world and overcomes the trauma that was making him a recluse. After Roxy's departure, Rudeus befriends a bullied girl named Sylphie, whom he has mistaken for a boy. Rudeus teaches her everything he knows, allowing her to become proficient with magic. Realizing the co-dependence between Rudeus and Sylphie is limiting their potential (and because Rudeus wanted a job), Rudeus's father, Paul Greyrat, sends Rudeus to his relatives to work as a tutor and enlighten him about the world.
2	Boyhood: Home Tutor Part (少年期 家庭教師編, Shōnen-ki Kateikyōshi-hen)	December 9–16, 2012
Rudeus is bought into the Boreas branch of the Greyrat family and becomes a tutor to Eris Boreas Greyrat, an arrogant and violent girl. To become her tutor, Rudeus and the Boreas family arrange a fake kidnapping, which is turned into a real kidnapping when a butler betrays them. Regardless, Rudeus wins her favor and becomes her tutor for mathematics, languages, and magic. Over the years, Rudeus bonds with the Boreas family and especially with Eris, and teaches himself more about the world, learning several different languages on the side. On his tenth birthday, Eris and the Boreas family presents Rudeus with a magic staff. Shortly after, a magic beam hits the country, transporting people throughout the world. Roxy arrives at the city, and decides to join a search party led by Rudeus's father.
3	Boyhood: Adventurers Introduction Part (少年期 冒険者入門編, Shōnen-ki Bōken-sha Nyūmon-hen)	December 23, 2012 – January 13, 2013
Rudeus can pull Eris and himself to safety mid-teleportation and finds themselves on the Demon Continent, an area inhabited by demon citizens and powerful monsters. Cautiously heeding the words of a mysterious Human-God, Rudeus befriends Ruijerd Superdia who volunteers to escort them home. Passing through Roxy's hometown, they arrive in a city named Rikaris and sign up at an adventurer's guild to make money for the voyage. Coming upon a group of pet kidnappers, Rudeus destroys their operation and uses their rank to take higher level quests from the guild. Eventually, they are discovered and blackmailed, forcing them to leave town. Acknowledging his leadership was at fault, Rudeus changes the group dynamic to take Eris and Ruijerd's opinions into account.
4	Boyhood: Journey Part (少年期 渡航編, Shōnen-ki Tokō-hen)	January 14–24, 2013
The party arrives at a part that will take them to their next destination, the Milis continent. Following the Human-God's advice, Rudeus enters an alleyway and encounters the Demon Empress Kishirika Kishirisu, who gives him the power of foresight as a reward. Due to the Milis' discrimination against the Supard race, Rudeus pays an organized crime group to smuggle Ruijerd. Once there, Rudeus and Ruijerd betray the organization to save kidnapped children from the beast race. After freeing the Holy Beast, the beast race's deity, the beast race mistaken Rudeus to be part of the organization and is incarcerated. After clearing the misunderstanding, Rudeus, Ruijerd, and Eris spend a few months with the beast race as they wait for the seasonal rainstorm to pass. They then continue onwards and are accompanied by Gisu, Rudeus's cellmate, who was imprisoned for gambling.
5	Boyhood: Reunion Part (少年期 再会編, Shōnen-ki Saikai-hen)	February 7–17, 2013
Arriving in Milis' capital, Milishion, the group and Gisu go their separate ways. Rudeus comes upon a kidnapping and intervenes, learning that the kidnapping is actually a rescue orchestrated by Paul's search group. Paul chastises Rudeus for failing to search for teleportation victims on the magic continent, who is taunted by Rudeus in return, causing the two to fight. Rudeus realizes that aside from Norn, the rest of his family are still missing. After some self-reflection, Rudeus and Paul reconcile before continuing on their journey. Arriving at West Port to travel to the Asura continent, Ruijerd's connection and Rudeus's aunt (Therese Latreia), allows them to board a ship despite the ban against the Supard race.
6	Boyhood: Homecoming Part (少年期 帰郷編, Shōnen-ki Kikyō-hen)	March 16–29, 2013
Arriving in the Dragon King Kingdom, the Human-God advises Rudeus to travel to Shirone Kingdom to save Lilia and Aisha. There, Rudeus meets Pax, the seventh prince of Shrione, who captured Lilia and Aisha to bait Rudeus and, in turn, Roxy, who he desires to court aka rape & dominate. Due to Pax's authoritarian rule, his soldiers rebel; at the same time Rudeus befriends the third Prince Zanoba, who helps free him from the prison. In the aftermath, Pax and Zanoba are sent out of the country, while Lilia and Aisha journey to reunite with Paul. On their journey, Rudeus and his companions meet the Dragon God Orsted, who attacks after hearing the Human-God's name. Utterly defeated, Rudeus is spared by Nanahoshi Shizuka, Orsted's companion. Continuing onwards, the party arrives at Eris's hometown. After saying their goodbyes to Ruijerd, Eris learns her entire family is dead. In response, Eris asks Rudeus to become her family and sleeps with him. She then leaves to train her sword skills, in order to become a worthy woman by his side, but doesn't tell Rudeus any of this beforehand. Instead, Rudeus believes his sexual performance was lacking, leaving him heartbroken and believing that was the real reason why Eris left. Elsewhere, Roxy becomes acquainted with Kishirika who reveals the location of Rudeus' mother.
7	Adolescence: Admission Part (青少年期 入学編, Seishōnen-ki Nyūgaku-hen)	April 16–22, 2013
Two years after Eris's departure, the psychological trauma left Rudeus impotent. Since then, Rudeus has been adventuring and spreading his name in order to search for his missing mother. Roxy's companion, Elinalise Dragonroad, relays Zenith's location to Rudeus, and how the others wish for him to live his life instead. On the Human-God's advice, Rudeus and Elinalise enroll into Ronoa Magic University to cure his erectile dysfunction. There, he becomes reacquainted with Zanoba and befriends Fitts.
8	Adolescence: Special Student Part (青少年期 特別生掌握編, Seishōnen-ki Tokubetsu-sei Shōaku-hen)	April 23 – May 9, 2013
Growing impatient, Zanoba requests Rudeus to teach him how to create figurines; Zanoba's lack of magic and talent makes him a lost cause. Instead, they search the slave market and purchase a young female dwarf they name Juliet and teach her magic. Rudeus soon learns that Linia Dedoldia and Pursena Adoldia destroyed his precious Roxy figurine, and enacts vengeance against them. Later, Cliff Grimoire, requests Rudeus to introduce him to Elinalise. After an earnest proposal, the two begin dating and Cliff begins his research on curses in order to cure Elinalise's ailment. Next, the beast race's mating season starts and Rudeus is besieged with challengers who wish to wed Linia or Pursena. Coincidentally, the demon lord Badigadi also challenges Rudeus to affirm Kishirika's speculations. Rudeus achieves Badigadi's conditions for victory, causing his fame to rise within the school. Afterwards, Rudeus becomes reacquainted with Nanahoshi, who is a student under the name Silent Seven Stars. It is revealed Nanahoshi was one of the teenagers Rudeus failed to save before his death, and was transported to the current world with her original body. She requests Rudeus to power her magic circles in order to create a spell to return home.
9	Adolescence: Sylphiette Part (青少年期 シルフィエット編, Seishōnen-ki Shirufietto-hen)	June 8–18, 2013
Fitts' monologue reveals her identity to be Sylphiette, whose hair has turned white following the teleportation incident. Following the incident, she was teleported to Ariel Anemoi Asura's palace and saved her from a monster. With her home gone, Ariel has Sylphie become her bodyguard. Due to the political strife and assassination for the throne, Ariel and her companions were forced to flee; they enroll into Ronoa Magic University as a political farce and to have Ariel build up connections to claim the throne. In the present, Sylphie's timidness forces Ariel and her knight, Luke Notos Greyrat, to plot a way to have her seduce Rudeus. Eventually succeeding, Sylphie reveals her identity to him, and uses an aphrodisiac to cure his impotency. In Ariel's presence, Rudeus clears up any misunderstandings and declares his loyalty and marriage to Sylphie.
10	Adolescence: Newlywed Part (青少年期 新婚編, Seishōnen-ki Shinkon-hen)	June 26 – July 2, 2013
Rudeus begins searching for a house for his marriage. With Zanoba and Cliff's support, Rudeus investigates a haunted machine and neutralizes an automated doll which killed the past inhabitants. Zanoba researches the doll and the creator's notes while Rudeus renovates his new home. Rudeus and Sylphie hold a wedding reception, where they learn Elinalise is Sylphie's great-grandmother.
11	Adolescence: Younger Sister Part (青少年期 妹編, Seishōnen-ki Imōto-hen)	July 28 – August 9, 2013
On Paul's behalf, Ruijerd escorts Norn and Aisha to Rudeus's home where they will be staying until Zenith is rescued. Aisha decides to become Rudeus's maid while Norn enrolls and dorms at Ronoa Magic University. However, being always compared to Rudeus and feeling completely alone, Norn secludes herself in her dorm. Rudeus sneaks into the dorms to see Norn, allowing her to sort out her negative feelings towards him. Months pass, and Sylphie becomes pregnant. Shortly after, Rudeus receives a letter from Paul's group, requesting for his assistance. The Human-God tells Rudeus to stay home, but is convinced to leave when Norn attempts to sneak out and go on the journey herself.
12	Adolescence: Begaritt Continent Part (青少年期 ベガリット大陸編, Seishōnen-ki Begaritt Tairiku-hen)	August 30 – September 6, 2013
Learning that Rudeus will need two years for his journey, Nanahoshi informs him about a hidden area containing a teleportation circle, which would shorten his overall journey to six months. Together with Elinalise, they are teleported to the Begaritt Continent, where they traverse a desert of monsters and accompany a band of merchants. Arriving at their destination, they are reunited with Paul's group, and learn that Zenith is inside a legendary dungeon called the Teleport Labyrinth, and that Roxy is missing inside.
13	Adolescence: Labyrinth Part (青少年期 迷宮編, Seishōnen-ki Meikyū-hen)	October 5–21, 2013
Rudeus had coincidentally brought a book with him about the Teleport Labyrinth, allowing the party to map and navigate the dungeon quickly. After finding Roxy, they retreat, allowing her to recuperate before re-entering the dungeon. The party proceeds to the final room and battles a Lernaean Hydra resulting in the loss of Paul's life and Rudeus's left hand. The party free Zenith from a magic crystal and discover she is in a dreamlike state. Rudeus mourns Paul's death and agonizes the neglect he's shown his parents from the past life. To cheer him up, Roxy seduces him, and the two start a relationship. Returning home, Rudeus gains Sylphie's permission to have Roxy as his second wife. Months later, Sylphie gives birth to Lucy Greyrat.
14	Young Man: Everyday Part (青年期 日常編, Seinen-ki Nichijō-hen)	November 23 – December 4, 2013
Rudeus and friends life are highlighted and developed: Roxy becomes a teacher at the Ronoa Magic University; a fanclub is built around Norn; Rudeus learns lightning magic, achieves a threesome with his wives, and hosts a party to celebrate his sisters' birthdays and marriage to Roxy; Pursena defeats Linia in a duel and returns home to become the village chief, and Nanahoshi makes progress in her experiments to create a teleportation circle home. As thanks, she invites Rudeus and his friends to meet Perugius Dola, a dragon tribe known for defeating Laplace.
15	Young Man: Summoning Part (青年期 召喚編, Seinen-ki Shōkan-hen)	January 6–17, 2014
Travelling to Perugius's floating castle, Nanahoshi becomes sick, spurring Rudeus and his friends to search for Kishirika, who may know a cure to her ailment. Their search leads them to a confrontation with the demon Atoferatofe Raibaku, and Perugius eventually rescue them. With Nanahoshi cured, Rudeus returns home and is advised by the Human-God to check his basement. Rudeus is stopped by a future version of himself, revealing a mouse will leave the cellar and inflict Roxy with a terminal disease. The future Rudeus explains that following Roxy's death, the Human-God kills everyone he cares about. Before dying, the future Rudeus gives his diary and instructs his present self to do three things: consult with Nanahoshi, write an apology letter to Eris, and doubt but not oppose the Human-God.
16	Young Man: Human-god Part (青年期 人神編, Seinen-ki Hito-gami-hen)	February 17–28, 2014
The Human-God confesses his plans, explaining how Orsted and Rudeus's descendants will cause his death; to appease him, Rudeus agrees to kill Orsted. Rudeus sends a letter to Eris, requesting her assistance, and develops a battle suit for the upcoming battle. As they battle, Orsted comes to understand Rudeus's predicament and offers to employ him. Rudeus accepts upon learning Orsted knows how to protect his family. Rudeus returns home with Eris and takes her as his third wife after resolving their misunderstandings.
17	Young Man: Kingdom Part (青年期 王国編, Seinen-ki Ōkoku-hen)	April 1–11, 2014
Orsted and Rudeus discuss information regarding the Human-God, the power of destiny, and employment conditions. Without much detail, Orsted tasks Rudeus to help Ariel become queen as that outcome will be unfavorable to the Human-God. Also, Orsted provides Rudeus with a summoning circle to summon a familiar with a strong destiny, to protect his family from the Human-God's powers. Rudeus ends up summoning the beast race's deity, the Holy Beast, and nicknames it Leo. Meanwhile, Perugius will offer his assistance to Ariel's campaign if she correctly answers his question about kingship. Rudeus guides Ariel to the correct answer, earning Perugius's favor, and they prepare for their journey to the Asura Kingdom.
18	Young Man: Asura Kingdom Part (青年期 アスラ王国編, Seinen-ki Asura Ōkoku-hen)	May 22 – June 4, 2014
With Orsted's guidance, Rudeus comes into contact with an Asuran criminal network to smuggle them into the kingdom. In doing so, Ariel recruits one of the personnel to testify against a rival for the throne. After thinning out the assassins after Ariel, a banquet is held for the nobles of Asura. There, Ariel uses Perugius's to sway the nobles to her faction and incriminate a rival minister. Under the Human-God's urging, a powerful swordsman crashes the banquet to help the minister escape; the two are thwarted, securing Ariel's position for the crown. In the aftermath, Sylphie resigns from being Ariel's knight, Orsted reveals he is in a perpetual time loop until the Human-God is killed. Rudeus begins training again after reflecting on his earlier weakness.
19	Young Man: Subordinates Part (青年期 配下編, Seinen-ki Haika-hen)	July 3–13, 2014
Rudeus lives his daily life while completing missions for Orsted. Roxy gives birth to a girl named Lara Greyrat, and Eris becomes pregnant. Linia, who has become a slave following her failed career as a merchant, is freed from captivity by Eris. Rudeus pays off the slave owners, and in turn, Linia is forced to work off the debt. Instead, Linia causes discord in the house, so Rudeus decides to put her and Aisha in charge of recruiting subordinates to help Orsted's cause. Aisha's management results in the Rodos company's formation, an employment agency, yielding great profits. Linia receives a letter from the beast race urging her to seek the Holy Beast. Rudeus, Linia, and Leo travel to the beast race's home and convinces the chief to let Leo stay with the Greyrat family. On the behest of Linia, Pursena returns with them. Afterwards, Zanoba receives a letter from Pax, who has taken the Shirone throne by force and has ordered for his return.
20	Young Man: Zanoba Part (青年期 ザノバ編, Seinen-ki Zanoba-hen)	August 21 – September 2, 2014
Zanoba's recall deviates from future Rudeus's diary, leading them to believe it is a ploy by the Human-God. Since Pax's kingship will lead to a republic nation's formation, Orsted orders Rudeus to ensure his survival. Rudeus and Roxy accompany Zanoba on his return, where they are later stationed at a fort. After successfully warding off a foreign nation's invasion, the party learns that rebels led by an exiled prince have cornered the castle. Feeling betrayed by his people and lacking results, Pax commits suicide, fulfilling the Human-God's goal. With the annulment of the republic nation, Orsted will not be able to predict Laplace's birthplace and intervene in the latter's war campaign. In response, Rudeus decides to prepare an army to confront Laplace eighty years in the future.
20.5	Part 2 (間章, Kanshō)	October 16–21, 2014
The events of two years are highlighted in the volume. Rudeus uses the Rodos company and his figurine production to spread the news about the upcoming war with Laplace. Cliff and Rudeus graduate from the university. Norn and Aisha have a party to celebrate their coming of age. Cliff decides to return to Milishion to take a position of power within the Milis religion. Rudeus also receives a letter from Zenith's mother, demanding they travel to Milis. Together, Rudeus, Aisha, Zenith, and Cliff arrive within the city walls.
21	Young Man: Cliff Part (青年期 クリフ編, Seinen-ki Kurifu-hen)	November 7–22, 2014
Zenith's mother, Claire Lateria, wishes to wed her off to another man; Rudeus protests and cuts off all ties with the Lateria family. The Milis religion is divided into two factions; one accepts demons and the other persecutes them and are led by the pope and cardinal, respectively. Rudeus appeals to the pope in order to build a Rodos company branch there. Claire manages to take Zenith into custody by using Gisu and denies her plan. Contacting his aunt Theresa, a peaceful resolution is almost reached until the cardinal orders his knights to cripple Rudeus. Rudeus is forced to rebel and kidnaps the cardinal's religious figure, the mind-reading miko, to ensure his family's safety. Religious politics forces Claire and Zenith to reveal themselves. The miko reveals Claire's intentions were well-meaning towards Rudeus and Zenith; Claire hoped the rumors about Elinalise's adventures would cure Zenith but is disproved. After reconciliation, the miko reveals Zenith is conscious and is living a happy life with her grandchildren. Gisu reveals himself as Human-God's follower who manipulated the volume events and intended to build an army to kill Rudeus.
22	Young Man: Organization Part (青年期 組織編, Seinen-ki Soshiki-hen)	January 5–15, 2015
Rudeus travels around the world to make peace with influential people to dissuade them from joining Gisu's campaign; he ends up winning the favors of the swordsman known as the Death God, the Dragon King's Kingdom, and the leaders of the magic continent. Sylphie gives birth to a son with green hair, leading to unease until confirmed he is not Laplace's incarnate. Nanahoshi has completed her invention of a magic circle to go home, but a strange problem causes it to fail. She deduces she and Rudeus are the results of a time paradox in the future, which prevents her from returning home; she then enters stasis to close the time loop. Rudeus locates Kishirika, who gives him the power of clairvoyance and reveals Gisu is in the Bihaeril kingdom.
23	Young Man: Battle Part (青年期 決戦編, Seinen-ki Kessen-hen)	March 1–20, 2015
Rudeus and his allies travel to the Bihaeril kingdom and find Ruijerd and the superd survivors. Through a series of events by the Human-God, the supard village is stricken with a plague and is to be invaded by an army. After curing the disease, Rudeus and his allies overcome the invading army and earn the kingdom's cooperation. Gisu equips Badigadi with a legendary armor passed onto the North God Swordsman, Alexander Kallman, following his defeat. Orsted overwhelms Alexander and forces him to be his subordinate. With all matters settled, Rudeus returns home to his family.
24	Conclusion Part (青年期 完結編, Kanketsu-hen)	April 3, 2015
The characters' lives are highlighted during the time Rudeus is 34 and on his deathbed at 74. The story shifts years into the future and follows Lilia, a girl with the power to control time and is trapped in a perpetual time loop. She is used to summoning Nanahoshi's friend, Akito Shinohara, and falls in love with him. Akito's death causes Lilia to travel to the past where she bargains with an unknown entity, revealing her to be the cause of Rudeus's reincarnation, Nanahoshi's summoning and the teleportation incident. Rudeus's action creates a new future for Lilia as she starts her time loop for the final time.

== Light novel ==
Volume no.	Content	Japanese release date	Japanese ISBN	English release date		English ISBN
Volume no.	Content	Japanese release date	Japanese ISBN	Digital	Physical	English ISBN
1	Web Novel 1	January 24, 2014	978-4-04-066220-6	April 4, 2019	May 21, 2019	978-1-64275-138-3
2	Web Novel 2	March 25, 2014	978-4-04-066393-7	May 23, 2019	July 30, 2019	978-1-64275-140-6
3	Web Novel 3	May 23, 2014	978-4-04-066755-3	August 1, 2019	October 29, 2019	978-1-64275-705-7
4	Web Novel 4	August 25, 2014	978-4-04-066961-8	October 10, 2019	January 7, 2020	978-1-64505-179-4
5	Web Novel 5	October 24, 2014	978-4-04-067130-7	January 16, 2020	April 14, 2020	978-1-64505-228-9
6	Web Novel 6	February 25, 2015	978-4-04-067412-4	April 2, 2020	July 28, 2020	978-1-64505-488-7
7	Original story set between Web Novel 6 and 7	August 25, 2015	978-4-04-067759-0	July 9, 2020	October 27, 2020	978-1-64505-753-6
8	Web Novel 7 and start of 8	October 23, 2015	978-4-04-067946-4	October 1, 2020	December 8, 2020	978-1-64505-793-2
9	End of Web Novel 8 and part of 9	January 25, 2016	978-4-04-068046-0	January 21, 2021	March 30, 2021	978-1-64505-952-3
10	Web Novel 10 and start of 11	March 25, 2016	978-4-04-068192-4	March 25, 2021	April 20, 2021	978-1-64827-087-1
11	End of Web Novel 11 and 12	May 25, 2016	978-4-04-068347-8	May 6, 2021	June 1, 2021	978-1-64827-222-6
12	Web Novel 13	August 25, 2016	978-4-04-068483-3	July 15, 2021	August 17, 2021	978-1-64827-260-8
13	Web Novel 14	December 22, 2016	978-4-04-068745-2	September 23, 2021	November 16, 2021	978-1-64827-322-3
14	Web Novel 15	April 25, 2017	978-4-04-069189-3	November 25, 2021	January 18, 2022	978-1-64827-360-5
15	Web Novel 16	July 25, 2017	978-4-04-069355-2	February 17, 2022	April 5, 2022	978-1-63858-128-4
16	Web Novel 17	October 25, 2017	978-4-04-069587-7	April 21, 2022	May 10, 2022	978-1-63858-194-9
17	Web Novel 18	January 25, 2018	978-4-04-069664-5	June 16, 2022	July 19, 2022	978-1-63858-241-0
18	Web Novel 19	May 25, 2018	978-4-04-069925-7	July 14, 2022	October 25, 2022	978-1-63858-350-9
19	Web Novel 20	August 25, 2018	978-4-04-065167-5	September 29, 2022	November 8, 2022	978-1-63858-765-1
20	Web Novel 20.5 and start of 21	January 25, 2019	978-4-04-065502-4	December 22, 2022	January 31, 2023	978-1-63858-860-3
21	End of Web Novel 21	March 25, 2019	978-4-04-065637-3	February 23, 2023	March 21, 2023	978-1-63858-978-5
22	Start of Web Novel 22	July 25, 2019	978-4-04-065908-4	May 4, 2023	June 6, 2023	978-1-68579-636-5
23	End of Web Novel 22	June 25, 2020	978-4-04-064540-7	July 6, 2023	August 15, 2023	978-1-68579-645-7
24	Start of Web Novel 23	December 25, 2020	978-4-04-680069-5	August 24, 2023	October 17, 2023	978-1-68579-470-5
25	Continuation of Web Novel 23	September 25, 2021	978-4-04-680509-6	October 26, 2023	December 26, 2023	978-1-68579-571-9
26	End of Web Novel 23 and 24	November 25, 2022	978-4-04-681933-8	February 1, 2024	March 12, 2024	979-8-88843-435-2

=== Redundant Reincarnation ===
No.	Original release date	Original ISBN	English release date	English ISBN
1	August 25, 2023	978-4-04682-560-5	October 31, 2024 (digital); November 26, 2024 (physical)	979-8-89160-510-7
2	May 24, 2022	978-4-04683-328-0	December 19, 2024 (digital); March 18, 2025 (physical)	979-8-89160-906-8
3	June 25, 2025	978-4-04684-717-1	December 18, 2025 (digital); February 24, 2026 (physical)	979-8-89373-339-6
4	November 25, 2026	978-4-04660-536-8	July 6, 2027 (physical)	979-8-89863-210-6

== Manga ==
In the May 2014 issue of Monthly Comic Flapper, it was announced that the manga adaptation of Mushoku Tensei by Yuka Fujikawa would premiere in the June issue; though Yuka is the author of the manga series, character designs are credited to ShiroTaka. Media Works collected the individual chapters into tankōbon volumes; the first volume was released in October 2014. In January 2015, Seven Seas Entertainment announced its licensing of the manga series for localization in North America.

=== Volumes ===
No.	Original release date	Original ISBN	English release date	English ISBN
1	October 23, 2014	978-4-04-066884-0	November 24, 2015	978-1-62692-235-8
2	March 23, 2015	978-4-04-067293-9	February 9, 2016	978-1-62692-244-0
3	September 19, 2015	978-4-04-067808-5	June 7, 2016	978-1-62692-279-2
4	March 23, 2016	978-4-04-068226-6	October 18, 2016	978-1-62692-342-3
5	September 23, 2016	978-4-04-069418-4	April 18, 2017	978-1-62692-454-3
6	March 23, 2017	978-4-04-069109-1	October 24, 2017	978-1-62692-562-5
7	September 23, 2017	978-4-04-069418-4	April 24, 2018	978-1-62692-723-0
8	March 23, 2018	978-4-04-069776-5	December 18, 2018	978-1-62692-945-6
9	October 23, 2018	978-4-04-065100-2	August 20, 2019	978-1-64275-119-2
10	March 23, 2019	978-4-04-065576-5	February 25, 2020	978-1-64505-204-3
11	October 23, 2019	978-4-04-064046-4	September 8, 2020	978-1-64505-740-6
12	March 23, 2020	978-4-04-064469-1	February 16, 2021	978-1-64827-077-2
13	August 20, 2020	978-4-04-064816-3	July 6, 2021	978-1-64827-283-7
14	January 21, 2021	978-4-04-680113-5	February 15, 2022	978-1-63858-105-5
15	June 23, 2021	978-4-04-680670-3	September 27, 2022	978-1-63858-608-1
16	November 22, 2021	978-4-04-680885-1	March 7, 2023	978-1-68579-472-9
17	June 22, 2022	978-4-04-681385-5	August 8, 2023	978-1-68579-915-1
18	December 22, 2022	978-4-04-681985-7	March 5, 2024	979-8-88843-373-7
19	July 22, 2023	978-4-04-682607-7	August 13, 2024	979-8-89160-193-2
20	February 22, 2024	978-4-04-683275-7	February 18, 2025	979-8-89160-882-5
21	August 22, 2024	978-4-04-683847-6	August 12, 2025	979-8-89373-913-8
22	March 22, 2025	978-4-04-684617-4	February 3, 2026	979-8-89561-996-4
23	August 22, 2025	978-4-04-685014-0	July 21, 2026	979-8-89765-861-9
24	February 24, 2026	978-4-04-685622-7	March 30, 2027	979-8-89863-209-0
25	September 18, 2026	978-4-04-660458-3	—	—
