= List of Mushoku Tensei characters =

The Greyrat family members as of the final volume of the light novel: the main characters Rudeus and his three wives Roxy Migurdia, Sylphiette, and Eris Boreas; supporting characters Zenith, Lilia, Norn, and Aisha; Rudeus's children Lucy, Lara, Ars, Sieghart, Lily, and Christina.

Mushoku Tensei takes place in a fantasy world based on the sword and sorcery genre. The story revolves around an unnamed Japanese NEET who dies and reincarnates in the fantasy world as Rudeus Greyrat. He retains all the knowledge from his previous life and vows to make the best out of his second life without any regrets.

== Main characters ==
Rudeus Greyrat (Note: ルーデウス・グレイラット, Rūdeusu Gureiratto)
Voiced by: Hiro Shimono (audio drama), Tomokazu Sugita (anime, former self, alternate future self), Yumi Uchiyama (anime) (Japanese); Ben Phillips (former self), Madeleine Morris (English)
Before his reincarnation, he was a plump 34-year-old Japanese NEET who became a recluse following his high school persecution and dropout after being tormented by an upperclassman; although his family, friends and school peers encouraged him to return to school, he refused and pushed them all away. When his parents passed away twenty years later, he refused to attend their funeral, as a result, he was disowned by his siblings and kicked out of the family home, making him homeless; while wandering the streets, he spotted a truck headed towards a group of high school students crossing the street at high speed and ran over to save them; causing the truck to hit and kill him in the process.^{WN 1.P} After his reincarnation, he discards his past identity, and works hard to make his new life as Rudeus Greyrat more meaningful. As such, he adopts a gentleman persona, though his past life's perversion sometimes emerges and scares those around him. Since he retains his intelligence, Rudeus was able to start magic training at age 3, and learn how to cast magic without chanting. Due to this training, he has an abnormally large mana capacity. Because his magic teacher, Roxy Migurdia, helped him to overcome his fear of the outside world, he admires her and ties his accomplishments to her.^{WN 1.10} During his spare time, Rudeus makes figurines to enhance his earth magic, which has become his main offensive magic.
Roxy Migurdia (Note: ロキシー・ミグルディア, Rokishī Migurudia)
Voiced by: Ryō Hirohashi (audio drama), Konomi Kohara (anime) (Japanese); Michelle Rojas (English)
A mage from the Migurd tribe known for their telepathy, blue hair, youthful appearance, and longevity. She leaves her village due to feelings of isolation: she is not telepathic, but Migurds prefer to use telepathy for communication. Unable to make a stable living as an adventurer, she becomes a traveling tutor and eventually becomes Rudeus' teacher. After the teleportation incident, Roxy helps Paul search the world for survivors. She later becomes Rudeus' second wife.
Sylphiette (Note: シルフィエット, Shirufietto)
Voiced by: Ai Kayano (Japanese); Emily Neves (English)
An elf who is Rudeus' childhood friend and longtime crush. Bullied as a child, she was helped by Rudeus. Rudeus then teaches her magic when she asked him to after she witnessed him helping her with his magic and her hair is green. Rudeus' influence helped her learn how to cast magic without chanting. After the Teleport Incident, her hair turns white from mana exhaustion, and she became Princess Ariel's personal bodyguard under the alias Fitts. She later becomes Rudeus' girlfriend and first wife.
Eris Boreas Greyrat (Note: エリス・ボレアス・グレイラット, Erisu Boreasu Gureiratto)
Voiced by: Ai Kakuma (Japanese); Lindsay Seidel (English)
A noble girl and a second cousin of Rudeus. She is a girl with a short temper and has reddish hair, but has potential in the Sword-God style. During her journey with Rudeus to return home following the teleportation incident, she grows to love Rudeus but gets worried after seeing how Rudeus was defeated by Orsted and nearly died as a result of her not being strong enough to protect Rudeus with her sword skills. She then leaves Rudeus on a journey to further enhance her sword fighting power. Some time after beginning her training in the Holy Land of Swords, she relinquished her Boreas name. After reuniting with Rudeus, she became his third wife.

== Greyrat family ==
Paul Greyrat (Note: パウロ・グレイラット, Pauro Gureiratto)
Voiced by: Eiji Takemoto (audio drama), Toshiyuki Morikawa (anime) (Japanese); Jared Smith (English)
Rudeus' father. He discarded his noble lineage due to its restrictive lifestyles and became a proficient swordsman skilled in all three sword styles: Sword-God, Water-God, and North-God style. He is described as a playboy and an adventurer with sharp intuition. Following the teleportation incident and unable to find his family, Paul falls into a depression and drowns his sorrows in alcohol until his reunion with Rudeus.^{WN 5.45}He was killed by the hydra in the labyrinth while trying to save Rudeus and rescue Zenith.
Zenith Greyrat (Note: ゼニス・グレイラット, Zenisu Gureiratto)
Voiced by: Hisako Kanemoto (Japanese); Bryn Apprill (English)
Paul's first wife and Rudeus' mother. She also left her noble home due to the restrictive lifestyle, and she sought to become an adventurer with her skills in healing magic.^{LNS 1} Paul saves her from people attempting to take advantage of her and she falls in love with him.^{LNS 1} When Lilia becomes pregnant with Paul's child, Rudeus convinces her to forgive them. Following the Teleport Incident, however, she was transported into the Teleportation Labyrinth and encased within a mana crystal. After being rescued, she awoke as a Miko, but was left in a constant dream-like state.
Lilia Greyrat (Note: リーリャ・グレイラット, Rīrya Gureiratto)
Voiced by: Lynn (Japanese); Dani Chambers (English)
Originally Paul's classmate in a swordsman dojo. A crippling injury forces her to leave her position as a princess guard. She becomes a maid to Paul and Zenith.^{WN 1.2} She later has an affair with Paul and becomes pregnant. After working through the revelation with the family, she is taken in as Paul's second wife and becomes closer friends with Zenith. Rudeus' behavior as an infant scared her, though she swears her loyalty to him after he helps her to reconcile with Zenith.^{WN 1.9}
Norn Greyrat (Note: ノルン・グレイラット, Norun Gureiratto)
Voiced by: Saya Aizawa (Japanese); Bryn Apprill (English)
Zenith's daughter and Rudeus' younger sister. She was with Paul after the teleportation incident and loved him dearly.^{WN 5.45} When she saw a violent argument break out between Rudeus and Paul, she grew scared of the former and began to resent him.
Aisha Greyrat (Note: アイシャ・グレイラット, Aisha Gureiratto)
Voiced by: Yūki Takada (Japanese); Meg McClain (English)
Lilia's daughter and Rudeus' younger half-sister. From her mother's teachings, Aisha takes it upon herself to manage Rudeus' housework. She is exceptionally talented and intelligent but dedicates herself to housework instead of furthering her skills.
Lucy Greyrat (Note: ルーシー・グレイラット, Rūshī Gureiratto)
Rudeus' first child, and Sylphiette's first child and only daughter. At the age of three, she began to receive the same training as Rudy when she was a child, learning magic and swordsmanship. She always thought that because of her father was a great genius, she didn't have any expectations for the late-blooming children, so she have been working hard to get her father's praise and approval.
Lara Greyrat (Note: ララ・グレイラット, Rara Gureiratto)
Rudeus' second child, and Roxy's first daughter. The way she grew up with her hair tied behind her back is very similar to her mother, to the extent that even her father once mistook her and hugged her from behind. Unlike Roxy, she has the telepathic ability of the Migurd tribe to talk to her. According to Rifujin na Magonote, it is heavily implied Lara is the key to defeat Hitogami in the future.
Ars Greyrat (Note: アルス・グレイラット, Arusu Gureiratto)
Rudeus' third child, and Eris' first child and only son. He inherits his late grandfather's dead-ringing personality due to his similar hairstyle, sexual perversion, and interest of swordsmanship. When visiting the Holy Kingdom of Milis, he sneaked out with Lily and Sieghart for an adventure and was almost kidnapped when he got lost on the trip until his half-aunt Aisha helped Leo to arrive in time to protect them.
In Redundant Reincarnation Volume 3 (nicknamed "Jobless Red Carpet"), he genuinely developed a romantic relationship with Aisha at the time they were caught by Rudeus and leads to family crisis, causing them to elope elsewhere; Roxy was the only one who regretted their incident and eventually lets them go. The following year, he and Aisha are living in a cottage, where the latter was pregnant as a result of their relationship. After their sword fight and genuine love, Rudeus decided to forgive them with several conditions, one of which was that Ars had to continue his education and had to be old enough to propose to Aisha, along with their newborn child Leroy needs to stay in the household as Aisha departs to look forward in an uncertain future. Since several years later, Ars finally met Aisha again. He seems to have grown into a handsome and mature man and now he is ready to propose to Aisha as his wife.
As a result of controversy from readers as well as a violation of their terms of service caused by this decision, Rifujin na Magonote ultimately decided to retain it in the light novel onwards.
Sieghart Saladin Greyrat (Note: ジークハルト・サラディン・グレイラット, Jīkuharuto Saradin Gureiratto)
Rudeus' fourth child, and Sylphiette's second child and only son. Due to his emerald green hair which is similar to previous antagonist "Laplace", Rudeus and Sylphiette felt anxious about his hair after the birth. However, Rudeus faced Perugius with the will to defend Sieghart to the end even if he was the reincarnation of Laplace. Perugius asked Rudeus to take Sieghart to the Sky Continent to complete a trial that allows Rudeus to dispel his doubts.
Lily Greyrat (Note: リリ・グレイラット, Riri Gureiratto)
Rudeus' fifth child, and Roxy's second daughter. She wanted to be a researcher despite her ordinary fencing and magic skills through her mother.
Christina Greyrat (Note: クリスティーナ・グレイラット, Kurisutīna Gureiratto)
Rudeus' sixth and youngest child, and Eris' second child and only daughter. Out of all Rudeus' children, she is extremely attached to her father and even spoiled by him, her mothers or her siblings.

== Fangs of the Black Wolf ==
Ghislaine Dedoldia (Note: ギレーヌ・デドルディア, Girēnu Dedorudia)
Voiced by: Megumi Toyoguchi (Japanese); Rachel Robinson (English)
A powerful swords-woman from a beast race and a member of the Dedoldia tribe, she has the epithet of Sword King and is a former member of Paul and Zenith's old party, Fangs of the Black Wolf. She is also the aunt of Linia Dedoldia. Ghislaine is employed as the Eris' family bodyguard; however, because she never learned to read and write, she was susceptible to scams until Rudeus taught her literacy and magic, including spells to enhance her abilities.
Elinalise Dragonroad (Note: エリナリーゼ・ドラゴンロード, Erinarīze Doragonrōdo)
Voiced by: Houko Kuwashima (audio drama), Rie Tanaka (anime); Mallorie Rodak (English)
An elf. She was Paul's former comrade and was part of Roxy's search party to help her look for Rudeus after his disappearance and enrolled in the academy with him to get young men. She is also found to be Sylphiette's grandmother and also becomes Cliff Grimoire’s wife.
Geese Nukadia (Note: ギース・ヌーカディア, Gīsu Nūkadia)
Voiced by: Yōji Ueda (Japanese); Spencer Liles (English)
Geese is a Demon Tribe member and an S-ranked adventurer in the thief role of the group.
Tallhand (Note: タルハンド, Taruhando)
Voiced by: Hōchū Ōtsuka (Japanese); Cris George (English)
He is the dwarf magician of the party with an affinity for Water and Wind magic. He is the 37th out of 51 siblings.

== Boreas Greyrat Family ==
Sauros Boreas Greyrat (Note: サウロス・ボレアス・グレイラット, Saurosu Boreasu Gureiratto)
Voiced by: Binbin Takaoka (Japanese); Brian Mathis (English)
He is the strict and outspoken landlord of Fittoa and the grandfather of Eris. His son is Philip Boreas Greyrat and he is also Paul's uncle. He was the first one to talk to Rudeus criticizing him for improper noble etiquette. He also fell for the charm of young Rudy, stating that he would wage war to make him head of the Notos house hold. After the Teleport Incident, he was blamed for the loss of the Fittoa Region and was executed.
Hilda Boreas Greyrat (Note: ヒルダ・ボレアス・グレイラット, Hiruda Boreasu Gureiratto)
Voiced by: Ryoka Yuzuki (Japanese); Samantha Herek (English)
She is the sophisticated and protective mother of Eris and Philip's wife. At first, Hilda is very cold toward Rudeus Greyrat as her two children were taken from her and she always looks at him with anger. However, as the years pass, she eventually grows fond of him, acting in a very maternal and proud manner; she even goes so far as to call him her son and offer her daughter Eris to him in marriage during the party for Rudeus' 10th birthday. In the Teleportation Incident, she and Philip were teleported to a dangerous location where they were found dead.
Philip Boreas Greyrat (Note: フィリップ・ボレアス・グレイラット, Firippu Boreasu Gureiratto)
Voiced by: Daisuke Ono (Japanese); Anthony Bowling (English)
He is the most easy-going member of the family and the father of Eris. Philip hires Rudeus that he reluctantly accepted him to be her daughter's tutor. After Rudeus' birthday party, Philip discusses his plans from behind the scenes to make Rudeus the head of the Boreas Family to that was previously impossible with Eris but Rudeus dismisses it as merely drinking chatter. In the Teleport Incident, he and Hilda were teleported into a dangerous location where they were found dead.

== Beast Tribe ==
Gustav Dedoldia (Note: ギュスターヴ・デドルディア, Gyusutāvu Dedorudia)
Voiced by: Shinpachi Tsuji (Japanese); Charlie Campbell (English)
Gustav is the chieftain of the Beast Tribe and Ghislaine's father.
Gyes Dedoldia (Note: ギュエス・デドルディア, Gyuesu Dedorudia)
Voiced by: Daiki Hamano (Japanese); Aaron Roberts (English)
Gyes is Ghislaine's impulsive older brother and the father of Linia and Minitona.
Minitona Dedoldia (Note: ミニトーナ・デドルディア, Minitona Dedorudia)
Voiced by: Shiori Izawa (Japanese); Kimmie Britt (English)
Minitona is the cheerful little sister of Linia.

== Migurd Tribe ==
Rowin Migurdia (Note: ロイン・ミグルディア, Roin Migurdia)
Voiced by: Yūsuke Kobayashi (Japanese); Howard Wang (English)
Roxy's youthful father, who is only capable of speaking telepathically.
Rokari Migurdia (Note: ロカリー・ミグルディア, Rokari Migurdia)
Voiced by: Satomi Satō (Japanese); Kimmie Britt (English)
Roxy's youthful mother, who is only capable of speaking telepathically.

== Demon Tribe ==
Kishirika Kishirisu (Note: キシリカ・キシリス, Kishirika Kishirisu)
Voiced by: Yuka Iguchi (Japanese); Jamie Marchi (English)
The demon empress known for her demon powers and the ability to bestow others with power. She is engaged to Badigadi.
Badigadi (Note: バーディガーディ, Badigadi)
Voiced by: Taiten Kusunoki (Japanese); Ray Hurd (English)
Badigadi is a boisterous demon at the university and Kishirika's betrothed. He is the younger brother of Atoferatofe.
Atoferatofe Rybak (Note: アトーフェラトーフェ・ライバック, Atoferatofe Raibaku)
Voiced by: Nanako Mori (Japanese); Erin Lundquist (English)
Atoferatofe is a demon who bestows strength. She is the older sister of Badigadi.
Moore (Note: ムーア, Mūa)
Voiced by: Yasuhiro Mamiya (Japanese); Tom Henry (English)
Moore is a stern and clever demon general serving Atoferatofe Rybak.

== Ranoa University of Magic ==
Zanoba Shirone (Note: ザノバ・シーローン, Zanoba Shīrōn)
Voiced by: Satoshi Tsuruoka (Japanese); Ian Sinclair (English)
A human born with unique abilities. His ability grants him superhuman strength and endurance. Since his youth, he had a fondness for dolls.
Cliff Grimoire (Note: クリフ・グリモル, Kurifu Gurimoru)
Voiced by: Ryōta Ōsaka (Japanese); Ry McKeand (English)
The grandson to the pope of Milis (Note: ミリス, Mirisu). He is a Special Student in the school due to his talents and he also becomes Elinalise Dragonroad's husband.
Linia Dedoldia (Note: リニア・デドルディア, Rinia Dedorudia) and Pursena Adoldia (Note: プルセナ・アドルディア, Purusena Adorudia)
Voiced by: Fairouz Ai (Linia), Minami Tanaka (Pursena) (Japanese); Alexis Tipton (Linia), Sara Ragsdale (Pursena) (English)
The beast-girl candidates to become the leader of their village. They are from the beast race with cat and dog characteristics, respectively. Initially, they were the academy’s troublemakers, but Rudeus tames them, and they begin to take their classes seriously. Linia is also Ghislaine's niece.
Shizuka Nanahoshi (Note: ナナホシ・シズカ, Nanahoshi Shizuka)
Voiced by: Shion Wakayama (Japanese); Suzie Yeung (English)
One of the Special Students. A genius in her own right, she never shows up to class due to her research. She was one of the two teenagers whom Rudeus failed to save before his reincarnation. She was transported to the new world, where she was discovered by Orsted. As a result of this transport, her body is frozen in time; she requires medication to disperse the buildup of magic within her, even though she herself possesses no magical power. She begins researching magic circles in an attempt to create a portal back to her own world.
Ariel Anemoi Asura (Note: アリエル・アネモイ・アスラ, Arieru Anemoi Asura)
Voiced by: Reina Ueda (Japanese); Sarah Wiedenheft (English)
A princess of the Asura kingdom who competes with her brother to the right to succeed the throne. Ariel is wise charismatic but vents her stress out through sadistic acts.^{WN 9.83} She and her bodyguards develop a strong friendship during their time together. Ariel intends to become the queen to honor the people who died for her.
Luke Notos Greyrat (Note: ルーク・ノトス・グレイラット, Rūku Notosu Gureiratto)
Voiced by: Kazuyuki Okitsu (Japanese); Aaron Campbell (English)
He is Rudeus' cousin and the personal knight to princess Ariel Anemoi Asura on the university grounds.
Juliette (Note: ジュリエット, Jurietto)
Voiced by: Sumire Morohoshi (Japanese); Ariel Graham (English)
A young dwarf girl whom Zanoba purchased to train her to help him create figurines.
Jinas Halfas (Note: ジーナス・ハルファス, Jīnasu Harufasu)
Voiced by: Yutaka Aoyama (Japanese); Sean Hennigan (English)
The recently promoted vice-principal of the Ranoa Magic University, and Roxy's teacher.

== Counter Arrow ==
Suzanne (Note: スザンヌ, Suzannu)
Voiced by: Yū Kobayashi (Japanese); Giovannie Cruz (English)
She is the caring Vice leader of Counter Arrow, an adventurer party that helps Rudeus after he parts ways with Eris.
Sara (Note: サラ, Sara)
Voiced by: Haruka Shiraishi (Japanese); Molly Searcy (English)
An impulsive young member of Counter Arrow, who eventually takes interest in Rudeus, however, her relationship with him did not work out.
Timothy (Note: ティモシー, Timoshī)
Voiced by: Wataru Hatano (Japanese); Phil Parsons (English)
A kind and experienced magician of Counter Arrow specialized in Fire and Earth magic.
Mimir (Note: ミミル, Mimiru)
Voiced by: Chiharu Sawashiro (Japanese); Dalton Tindall (English)
The healer of Counter Arrow.
Patris (Note: パトリス, Patorisu)
Voiced by: Itaru Yamamoto (Japanese); Reagan Murdock (English)
A Warrior Mage and a frontliner of the Counter Arrow party.

== Sword Sanctuary ==
Gal Farion (Note: ガル・ファリオン, Garu Farion)
Voiced by: Tetsu Inada (Japanese); Bradley Gareth (English)
He is the head master of the Sword Sanctuary and Sword God, ranked 6th on the Seven Great Powers, who takes Eris as an apprentice due to their shared desire to beat Orsted at his former student Ghislaine's behest. He is also Nina's father.
Nina Farion (Note: ニナ・ファリオン, Nina Farion)
Voiced by: Haruka Tomatsu (Japanese); Katie Otten (English)
She is initially a proud and conceited young student under her father, who becomes the rival and later, the friend of Eris. Her romantic interest is fellow student Gino.
Gino Britz (Note: ジノ・ブリッツ, Jino Burittsu)
Voiced by: Reiji Kawashima (Japanese); Rowan Gilvie (English)
Gino is a young and naive student, who grows to be a powerful practitioner of the Sword God Style, and Nina's love interest.
Timothy Britz (Note: ティモシー・ブリッツ, Timoshī Burittsu)
Voiced by: Hiroshi Tsuchida (Japanese); Seth Magill (English)
Timothy is Gino's father and a disciple of Gal and one of the current two Sword Emperors.

== Chaos Breaker ==
Perugius Dola (Note: オルステッド, Perugiusu Dōra)
Voiced by: Rikiya Koyama (Japanese); Kenny James (English)
A member of the Dragon Tribe, also called Armored Dragon King and one of the warriors who defeated Laplace during the war between humans and demons. He resides in a giant floating fortress called Chaos Breaker and has eleven familiar spirits serving him, as well as an angelic humanoid named Sylvaril. He awaits the day Laplace is reincarnated to kill him again.
Almanfi (Note: アルマンフィ, Arumanfi)
Voiced by: Kengo Kawanishi (Japanese); Aaron Campbell (English)
He is one of eleven summoned servants of Armored Dragon King Perugius Dola. A loyal and witty Spirit Familiar, who is skilled with a blade and can teleport.
Sylvaril (Note: シルヴァリル, Shiruvariru)
Voiced by: Ayumi Tsunematsu
She is a member of the Heaven Tribe, a majestic, angelic race of humanoids with wings. She is one of the most loyal servants of Perugius and the only one besides him, who can cast teleportation magic.

== Antagonists ==
Man-God (Note: 人神, Hito-gami)
Voiced by: Kujira (Japanese); Brandon McInnis (English)
An unidentified being who calls himself a "human god" or "Hitogami". He appears in the dreams of the mortals, gives them omens, and manipulates the world according to his own convenience. He possesses precognitive abilities, which allow him to see the many possible futures that may unfold. From the very beginning, the human god attempts to gain Rudeus’s trust in order to kill his family and avert a prophecy in which Rudeus’s descendants kill him once and for all.
Laplace (Note: ラプラス, Rapurasu)
The instigator of the human demon war. Initially, he was the second Dragon God, but he split into two during a confrontation with the Fighting God. One half became the Demon God Laplace known for his magical powers and his hatred of humans while the other half became the Technique God, who sided with the humans during the war. It is prophesied that, eighty years in the future, Laplace will instigate another war between demons and humans; his death is necessary to open the gateway to the Human God’s dimension.

== Other characters ==
Ruijerd Superdia (Note: ルイジェルド・スペルディア, Ruijerudo Superudia)
Voiced by: Daisuke Namikawa (Japanese); Christopher Wehkamp (English)
A kind man from the demon race known as supards.^{WN 3.23} They were manipulated and cursed by Laplace during the war between humans and demons. They developed a stigma of being murderous monsters. Under manipulation, Ruijerd killed his son, who could free him from Laplace's control. Following his species' death, Ruijerd travels the world to dissolve the stigma against the supard race.^{WN 3.23}
Orsted (Note: オルステッド, Orusuteddo)
Voiced by: Kenjiro Tsuda (Japanese); Gabe Kunda (English)
A member of the dragon tribe, humanoids with powerful abilities. He is considered the strongest of his kind, giving him the title of the hundredth Dragon God. Orsted has a constitution that makes everyone that meets him feel fear except for a few individuals. He is also present at Rudeus deathbed, musing that Rudeus' offspring is the only lineage that didn't fear him as badly as others.
Pax Shirone (Note: パックス・シーローン, Pakkusu Shīrōn)
Voiced by: Jun Fukushima (Japanese); Stephen Fu (English)
A spoiled and arrogant prince of the Kingdom of Shirone, Zanoba's younger brother and a former student of Roxy.
Soldat Heckler (Note: ゾルダート・ヘッケラー, Zorudāto Hekkerā)
Voiced by: Kohsuke Toriumi (Japanese); Alejandro Saab (English)
An arrogant S-ranked adventurer and the leader of the party Stepped Leader, who takes Rudy in after his departure from Counter Arrow. His party consists of 6 members.
Auber Corvette (Note: オーベール・コルベット, Ōbēru Korubetto)
Voiced by: Katsuyuki Konishi (Japanese); Cory Koehler (English)
Also known as "Peacock Sword" Auber, he is a pragmatic intuitive master of the North God Style, ranked as North Emperor.
Reida Lia (Note: レイダ・リィア, Reida Reia)
Voiced by: Mari Yokoo
She is a shrewd and perceptive elderly woman, who is also the Water God and grandmother of Isolte Cruel.
Isolte Cruel (Note: イゾルテ・クルーエル, Izorute Kurūeru)
Voiced by: Yoko Hikasa
She is a skilled and somewhat manipulative apprentice of her grandmother the Water God, initially ranked as Water King.

== Reception ==
Early response to Rudeus was primarily negative due to his perverted nature to the point the original writer noted that such was the point of his characterization. However, his relationship with his mentor and his father Paul were praised for bringing the narrative hidden depths. Roxy became a break out character in her own series which was praised by Otaku USA for being accessible but hoped to further develop her in future volumes. Comic Book Resources said that Mushoku Tensei is enjoyable thanks to the large amount of characters. TwinInfinite listed Roxy as one of the best teachers in anime. In a manga review from the early arcs, Akiba Station noted that while Rudeus gets into less fights, he is contrasted by the parallel adventures of Roxy. The figurine of Roxy that Rudeus creates in the series was popular enough to get its own replica in real life.

One of the web novel short stories from the after-story collection Redundant Reincarnation titled "The Day Aisha Quit Being a Maid" received backlash from some Japanese readers, criticizing its depiction of incestuous relationship between Ars and Aisha Greyrat. After receiving a notice from Shōsetsuka ni Narō management that it violated their terms of service on February 24, 2016, the author had decided to remove the short story from the website and make some minor changes for adaptations. The author stated that the core part of the after-story would remain the same; it returned as the third volume of the light novel, released on June 25, 2025.

== Notes ==
Japanese

- ^WN represents the web novel of the series in the format of X.Y, where X represents the volume and Y represents the chapter number. P stands for the prologue chapter, which is not numbered.
- ^LNS represents a special chapter added in the light novel volumes. The number beside the note denotes the volume number.
