= Yumi Uchiyama =

Japanese voice actress

- 内山 夕実
- Born: October 30, 1987 (age 39); Tokyo, Japan
- Occupation: Voice actress
- Years active: 2005; 2010–present
- Agents: Arts Vision (2005, 2010–2017); Office Osawa (2017–present)
- Notable work: Mushoku Tensei as Rudeus Greyrat; Digimon Universe: App Monsters as Haru Shinkai; DokiDoki! Precure as Davi/DB; Yuki Yuna Is a Hero as Fū Inubōzaki; Good Luck Girl! as Momiji; Nisekoi as Ruri Miyamoto; Re:Zero − Starting Life in Another World as Puck; Overlord as Mare Bello Fiore; The Irregular at Magic High School as Erika Chiba; Fire Force as Arrow
- Height: 160 cm (5 ft 3 in)
- Spouse: Yūsuke Kobayashi (m. 2024)

Yumi Uchiyama (内山 夕実, Uchiyama Yumi; born October 30, 1987) is a Japanese voice actress affiliated with Office Osawa.

== Biography ==
Uchiyama signed to Arts Vision and made her debut in 2005. However, she attended college and had family circumstances. After a five-year hiatus, she returned to Arts Vision and made her comeback with the dubbing role of Abbey in the overseas drama Let's Love Vampire delivered on BeeTV. The following year, she won the first regular role as Nagisa Tennōji in A Channel. In April 2017, it was reported that Uchiyama moved from Arts Vision to Office Osawa.

=== Personal life ===
Her husband is fellow voice actor Yūsuke Kobayashi, they had jointly announced their marriage through their official social media account on December 31, 2024.

== Filmography ==
=== Anime ===
2005

- Aria the Animation (voice-acting debut)

2011

- A-Channel: Nagisa "Nagi" Tennōji
- Blue Exorcist: Kashino
- Kimi to Boku: Junko; young Kaname Tsukahara; The Asaba twins mother
- Ro-Kyu-Bu!: Kikuchi
- Shinryaku!? Ika Musume: Tomomi Mochizuki
- Usagi Drop: Kazumi Kawachi

2012

- Aesthetica of a Rogue Hero: Valkyria (Ep. 1)
- Bakuman. 3: Hitomi Shiratori
- Baku Tech! Bakugan: Jinza
- Good Luck Girl!: Momiji
- Hyōka: Manga club member Sawai (Ep. 16); Noriko Shimizu (Ep. 13)
- Kimi to Boku 2: young Kaname Tsukahara; The Asaba twins mother; Aunt 2
- Kuromajo-san ga Toru!!: An Sakurada
- Saki Achiga-hen episode of Side-A: Arata Sagimori
- Say "I love you": Aiko Mutō

2013

- Ace of Diamond: Rei Takashima
- Aiura: Sumiko Yamashita
- Arpeggio of Blue Steel: Kirishima
- Doki Doki! PreCure: Daybi
- Genshiken Nidaime: Mirei Yajima
- Kin-iro Mosaic: Yoko Inokuma
- Kotoura-san: Hajime, Hiyori's mother
- The Devil Is a Part-Timer!: Mayumi Kisaki
- The Severing Crime Edge: Houko Byouinzaka
- Walkure Romanze: Emma
- Senyu: Ares

2014

- Brynhildr in the Darkness: Hatsuna Wakabayashi
- Buddy Complex: Margaret O'Keefe
- Buddy Complex Kanketsu-hen: Ano Sora ni Kaeru Mirai de: Margaret O'Keefe
- Cross Ange: Sayla's Mother
- Girl Friend Beta: Otome Kayashima (Ep. 5)
- Nanana's Buried Treasure: Shiki Maboro
- Nisekoi: Ruri Miyamoto
- Riddle Story of Devil: Mako Azuma (Tokaku's aunt)
- Sabagebu!: Miou Ootori
- Strike the Blood: Yuuma Tokoyogi
- The Irregular at Magic High School: Erika Chiba
- The Pilot's Love Song: Sonia Palez
- Yuki Yuna Is a Hero: Fū Inubōzaki

2015

- Lance N' Masques: Nori Hizuki
- Maria the Virgin Witch: Edwina
- Mobile Suit Gundam: Iron-Blooded Orphans: Fumitan Admoss
- Nisekoi:: Ruri Miyamoto
- Hello!! Kin-iro Mosaic: Yoko Inokuma
- Magical Girl Lyrical Nanoha ViVid: Harry Tribeca
- Overlord: Mare Bello Fiore
- The Asterisk War: Irene Urzaiz
- The Heroic Legend of Arslan: Etoile
- Ultimate Otaku Teacher: Yukino Kuribayashi

2016

- Bakuon!!: Onsa Amano
- Nijiiro Days: Mari Tsutsui
- Re:Zero − Starting Life in Another World: Puck
- Undefeated Bahamut Chronicle: Shalice Balshift
- Magical Girl Raising Project: Top Speed (Eps. 1-9)/ Tsubame Murota (Ep. 8)
- Digimon Universe: Appli Monsters: Haru Shinkai
- Servamp: Ophelia
- Tsukiuta. The Animation: Yuki Wakaba
- Rin-ne: Kuromitsu

2017

- Kabukibu!: Maruko Janome
- The Irregular at Magic High School: The Movie – The Girl Who Summons the Stars: Erika Chiba
- Battle Girl High School: Anko Tsubuzaki
- Land of the Lustrous: Rutile
- Yuki Yuna is a Hero: Hero Chapter: Fū Inubōzaki
- Schoolgirl Strikers: Animation Channel: Itsumi Natsume

2018

- Bakutsuri Bar Hunter: Potepen
- Katana Maidens ~ Toji No Miko: Maki Shidō
- The Seven Heavenly Virtues: Michael
- Slow Start: Hajime Nishimura
- Overlord II: Mare Bello Fiore
- Overlord III: Mare Bello Fiore

2019

- Pastel Memories: Irina Leskova
- Bermuda Triangle: Colorful Pastrale: Chante
- Kakegurui XX: Miyo Inbami
- Bakugan: Battle Planet: Shun Kazami
- Isekai Quartet: Puck, Mare Bello Fiore
- Granbelm: Sasha
- Fate/Grand Order - Absolute Demonic Front: Babylonia: Siduri
- Val × Love: Ichika Saotome
- Fire Force: Arrow
- Ace of Diamond act II: Rei Takashima

2020

- Fire Force 2nd Season: Arrow
- Bakugan: Armored Alliance: Shun Kazami
- Re:Zero − Starting Life in Another World 2nd Season: Puck
- Wandering Witch: The Journey of Elaina: Estelle

2021

- Cells at Work! Code Black: White Blood Cell (Neutrophilic)
- Mushoku Tensei: Jobless Reincarnation: Rudeus Greyrat
- Farewell, My Dear Cramer: Rei Kutani
- Vivy: Fluorite Eye's Song: Elizabeth
- Tokyo Revengers: Emma Sano
- Yuki Yuna is a Hero: The Great Mankai Chapter: Fū Inubōzaki

2022

- I'm Quitting Heroing: Melnes
- In the Heart of Kunoichi Tsubaki: Hana
- The Devil Is a Part-Timer!!: Mayumi Kisaki
- Overlord IV: Mare Bello Fiore

2023

- The Ice Guy and His Cool Female Colleague: Komori-san
- Ippon Again!: Shino Natsume
- Oshi no Ko: Aqua (young)
- Bleach: Thousand-Year Blood War: Candice Catnipp
- Undead Unluck: Akira Kuno
- That Time I Got Reincarnated as a Slime: Visions of Coleus, Blanc

2024

- Mission: Yozakura Family: Nanao Yozakura
- The Strongest Magician in the Demon Lord's Army Was a Human: Fiorentina
- Fairy Tail: 100 Years Quest: Kiria
- Kagaku×Bōken Survival: Marley

2025

- Welcome to Japan, Ms. Elf!: Wridra
- Sakamoto Days: Obiguro
- Shangri-La Frontier Season 2: Megumi Natsume

2026

- Easygoing Territory Defense by the Optimistic Lord: Van
- Eren the Southpaw: Eren Yamagishi
- Kill Blue: Eri Wanibuchi
- Daemons of the Shadow Realm: Dr. Sakurazawa
- My Stepmother and Stepsisters Aren't Wicked: Nago
- Even the Student Council Has Its Holes! Satomi Hiratsuka
- That Time I Got Reincarnated as a Slime season 4: Testarossa

=== Original video animation (OVA) ===
- A Channel + smile (2012), Nagisa "Nagi" Tennōji
- Arata-naru Sekai (2012), Itsushiya
- Nogizaka Haruka no Himitsu: Finale (2012), Setsugetsuka Tennōji
- Nisekoi: Loss / Shrine Maiden (2014), Ruri Miyamoto
- Nisekoi: Change / Work (2015), Ruri Miyamoto
- Nisekoi: Bath House (2015), Ruri Miyamoto
- Onna no Sono no Hoshi (2022), Haruko Kagawa
- Code Geass: Rozé of the Recapture (2024), Nala

=== Original net animation (ONA) ===
- Gakumon! Ōkami Shōjo wa Kujikenai (2014), Shushu
- Kengan Ashura (2019), Kaede Akiyama
- Rising Impact (2024), Platalissa Bonaire
- Yu-Gi-Oh! Card Game The Chronicles (2026), Rucia
- Yu-Gi-Oh! Card Game The Chronicles (2026), Rcielago

=== Video games ===
- Fantasista Doll Girls Royale (2013), Ukiwa
- schoolgirl strikers (2014), Itsumi Natsume
- Dragon Ball Xenoverse (2015), Time Patroller (Female 9)
- Battle Girl High School (2015), Tsubuzaki Anko
- Persona 5 (2016), Ichiko Ohya
- Girls und Panzer: Great Tankery Operation! (2016), Shizuka Tsuruki
- Granblue Fantasy (2016), Canna
- Azur Lane (2017), USS Oklahoma, USS Nevada, KMS Graf Zeppelin (Note: Uchiyama replaced Kayano for this role since 2022, after the latter's voice lines was removed from the Chinese servers of Azur Lane following her backlash as a result of her controversial Yasukuni Shrine visit in 2021.)
- Blue Reflection (2017), Ninagawa Mao
- Yuki Yuna is a Hero: Hanayui no Kirameki (2017), Fū Inubōzaki
- Girls' Frontline (2018), OTs-12, AAT-52
- Dragalia Lost (2018), Cleo
- Arknights (2019), Akafuyu
- Bleach: Brave Souls (2020), Candice Catnipp
- Sonic the Hedgehog (2021), Tangle the Lemur
- Honkai: Star Rail (2023), Natasha
- That Time I Got Reincarnated as a Slime: The Saga of How the Demon Lord and Dragon Founded a Nation (2023), Blanc (Primordial of White)
- Touhou Spell Carnival (2024), Marisa Kirisame
- The Apothecary Diaries: The False Imperial Brother (2027), Yanxi

=== Dubbing ===
- Erased as Amy Logan (Liana Liberato)
- The Ward as Zoey (Laura-Leigh)
