= Rudeus Greyrat =

Fictional character from Mushoku Tensei

- Mushoku Tensei character
- Manga illustration featuring Rudeus reborn as a toddler alongside his past-life self at the moment of his death.
- First appearance: Mushoku Tensei web novel 1: "Childhood" (2012)
- Created by: Rifujin na Magonote
- Voiced by: Japanese: Yumi Uchiyama (anime); Tomokazu Sugita (anime; former self, alternate future self); Hiro Shimono (audio drama); English: Madeleine Morris; Ben Phillips (former self)

In-universe information
- Nicknames: List: "Rudy"; "Rudeus of the Quagmire"; "The Owner of Dead End"; "Right Hand of the Dragon God"
- Race: Human
- Gender: Male
- Occupation: Sorcerer
- Weapon: Aqua Heartia (magic staff)
- Family: List: Paul Greyrat (father, deceased); Zenith Greyrat (mother); Norn Greyrat (younger sister); Aisha Greyrat (younger half-sister); Lilia Greyrat (stepmother)
- Spouses: List: Sylphiette Greyrat (1er wife); Roxy Migurdia Greyrat (2nd wife); Eris Boreas Greyrat (3er wife)
- Children: List: with Sylphiette: Lucy Greyrat (daughter); Sieghart Saladin Greyrat (son); with Roxy: Lara Greyrat (daughter); Lily Greyrat (daughter); with Eris: Ars Greyrat (son); Christina Greyrat (daughter)

Rudeus Greyrat (Japanese: ルーデウス・グレイラット, Hepburn: Rūdeusu Gureiratto) (Note: Nicknamed as Rudy) is the main protagonist of Rifujin na Magonote's novel series Mushoku Tensei. An unnamed 34-year-old Japanese hikikomori is evicted from his home. Upon some self-introspection, he had concluded that his life was ultimately pointless, but still intercepts a speeding truck heading towards a group of teenagers in an attempt to do something meaningful for once in his life and manages to pull one of them out of harm's way before dying. Awakening as a newborn baby, he realizes that he's been reincarnated in a world of sword and sorcery and resolves to live his second life to the fullest as Rudeus Greyrat. Due to inherited affinity and early training, in addition to his mother's influence, Rudeus becomes highly skilled at magic, and sets out to enjoy life and overcome his past.

In Japanese, the character is voiced by Tomokazu Sugita in his inner mind and former self, while Yumi Uchiyama voices the reborn Rudeus. Ben Phillips takes Sugita's work in the English dub, while Madeleine Morris does the young Rudeus.

Critical response to Rudeus has been mixed, with polarizing response due to his excessively perverted or even potentially pedophilic nature with regards to his early interactions with young female characters, while others have praised his growth into a more mature appearance later in the story.

== Creation ==
Concept artwork of Rudeus by Shirotaka, which gradually changes across the narrative.

Rifujin na Magonote said he came up with Rudeus's story by the premise of what he would do with his life if he was in another world; The idea of having a better childhood was the chosen for protagonist. He commented that he created Rudeus while being aware of how controversial he would be. He intended Rudeus's actions to be more meaningful in the process. He had no issue with criticizing Rudeus at the beginning stage, and left it to the audience to judge him. Magonote wanted the audience to pay attention to a specific side of his character and be able to relate to him. The author said it was a little strange for the hero who had ruined his entire life because of his failure at school in his life to call the school "a place where he can fail". Rifujin na Magonote had thought that he should give such impression. However, he also wanted to depict a student who fails at school trying to have another chance at life through this series. Earlier, he said that he felt a big response in episodes 6 to 7 of the web version of the novels, but that was just when Roxy took Rudeus out. Thanks to her, Rudeus overcomes the trauma. Such a story gave a warm impression to his readers, and made him, think, "Let's grow this character in this direction."

Ever since the novel started, Rifujin had the overall plot elaborated. The human spirit that Rudeus interacts with and the setting the protagonist explored remained the same. Regarding the ending of this novel, he was thinking of writing until Rudeus dies, and at the same time, writing until Rudeus turned 34, because he died at the age of 34. He also said that since the prologue is about an unemployed man who is kicked out of his house, he did not want the story to end with someone being beaten up. In addition, even if he continued the story, it would just be a repetition.

Originally, the story arc where Rudeus reunites with Aisha was supposed to be completely different from the published work. The original plan was not to make the trip so long, because Rudeus's plot was planned to be more stuffed, in the form of having an affair with Sylphiette while being tied to Eris. In the final scenario, Rudy is not cheating with anyone, so his relationships can be perceived as a little forcible, but the author decided to get him misunderstood. Seven Seas made localization changes in their translations of the light novels, such as toning down Rudeus's perverted behavior. They later decided to "re-evaluate" their localization decisions.

Anime director Manabu Okamoto said the "character has an opposing personality: a vulgar side that is incredibly difficult to sympathize with, as well as a more normal and conventional side that can be sympathized with. Those negative traits are a part of his identity, so he can't be rid of them", but took consideration to in avoiding discomfort with the audience. The staff felt it was extremely difficult to portray the gradual growth of a Rudeus going through significant body changes. In contrast to traditional time-skips to change Rudeus's design, the team decided to make the protagonist change little by little. The director left it up to the viewers to decide whether they did that well or not.

For the second season, director Hiroki Hirano said that he aims to develop Rudeus again from a low point as the first season ends up with Rudeus falling into depression after losing all his allies. He hopes he and the development staff will properly be able to address the growth of the character. Producer Nobuhiro Osawa expressed doubts about whether or not the team was sure about including more sidestories from the original series that helped in developing more Rudeus. The fact that Rudeus become a student of a magic school was one of the biggest points from the work. The producer noted that while Rudeus comes across as a crude person, he had a major changed after properly interacting with his father, to the point it became his favorite part so far. He was particularly fascinated by Rudeus's desire to avoid having regrets and instead enjoy life as much as possible.

=== Casting ===
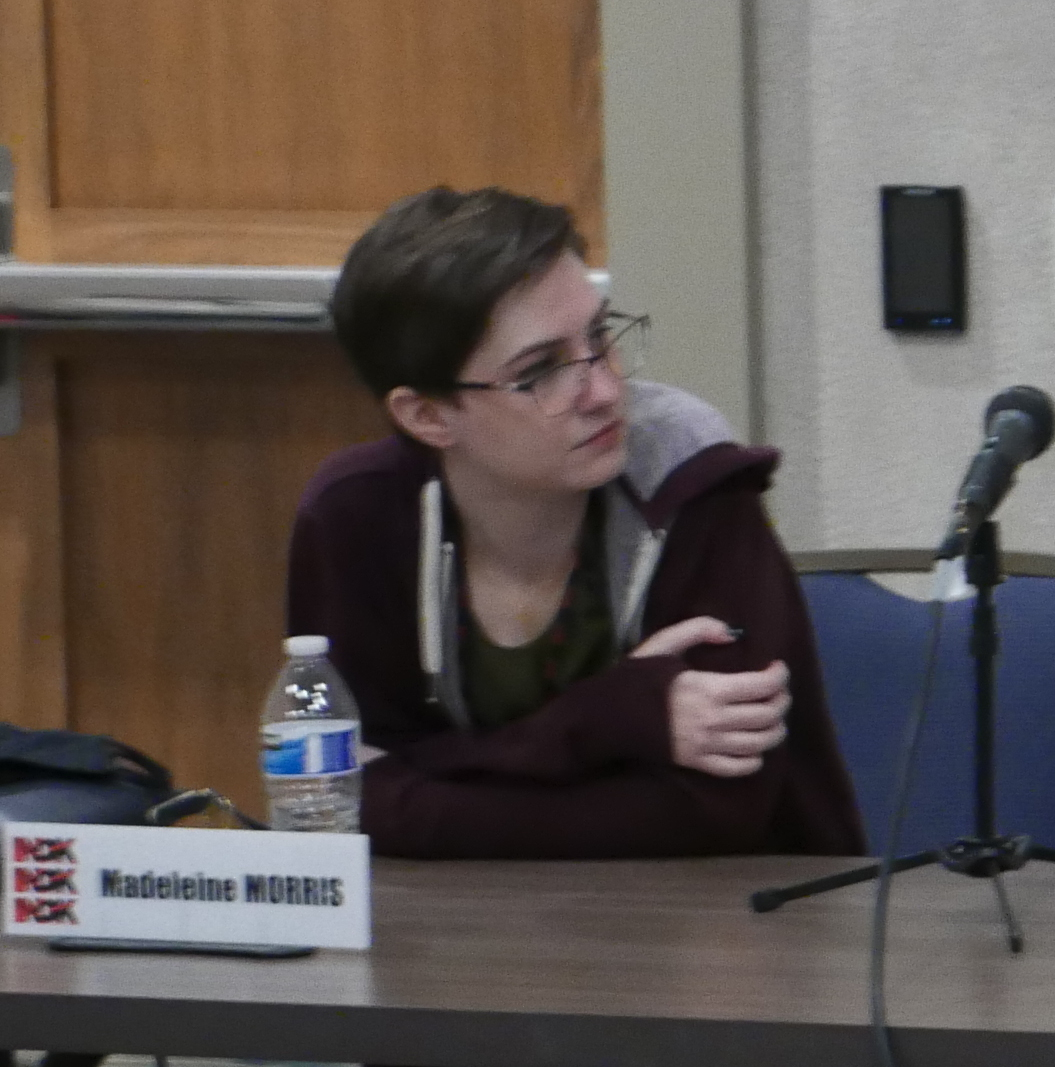
Madeleine Morris voices the young Rudeus in English.

In the first Mushoku Tensei audio drama, Rudeus was voiced by Hiro Shimono. The actor enjoyed the work despite being unfamiliar with the novels. He still expressed difficulties in delivering certain lines where the character yells. Rudeus's father Paul was voiced by Eiji Takemoto who wanted to connect with his "son" which led him to connect with Shimono during recording. Shimono stated that he felt the audio drama to be quite dark, despite his beliefs of the original novel being more comical.

The reason the anime staff cast Tomokazu Sugita as the man in Rudy's previous life was because when the director read the original story, he thought it was "impossible for him [Rudeus] to be [portrayed by] anyone else". It also served as an homage to his (Sugita) role in a beloved anime that once aired in the past, and that was the starting point for the casting. After that, Rudeus lives in his new world by generally acting with a mask on. His voice actor Yumi Uchiyama was noted to be "very skilled person", to the point "she nails that nuance". Upon first seeing the character, Sugita said he could not blame Rudeus for his actions based on how much bullied he was in his previous one. As a result, he is not sure how he would act in the story. In regards to season two, Sugita believes that despite the notable changes to Rudeus's life, the protagonist still has several lines much to his surprise. Osawa heavily praised Sugita's performance for making the character and story more effective to show to the audience. Rifujin na Magonote noted Sugita often asked for directions in order to play the role more seriously.

In the scene where Rudeus and Paul quarrel in episode 3, Uchiyama was able to know that there was a conflict from the perspective of the parents, but it is because the backbone and human drama of each of those characters are drawn very carefully. She felt that each and every character has a reality and is loved by everyone. From the standpoint of Rudeus, she was very encouraged when Eris said, "Rudeus is amazing!" thanks to how both characters have been interacting. Regarding Rudeus's mind, she says that she wants to be able to trace the character of Sugita, who played the role of the man from his [Rudeus's] previous life, but she also plays her own character. So as an actor, she was also experiencing a feeling that she cannot easily experience in other works. Uchiyama relates to Rudeus's second chance at life because she once quit her job but ended up taking it again, which helped her to become a more skilled worker. The original novel artist provided his own comments during the recording this scene. In the original, there is a scene where the two meet face to face at a bar, but at first Rudeus could not see Paul's face at all. For the anime, Rifujin said he wanted a support to either character when they are arguing and have Rudeus properly look at Paul's face, noting Rudeus also had experience from his previous side. In the end, this scene was Rifujin's favorite moment from the "Boyhood arc" due to how more mature was the portrayal of the protagonist.

In December 2021, Uchiyama posted an update on Twitter that she would leaving the series after the next episode and was glad with her work and support. However, on December 10, 2022, it was announced that the voice actress will continue to play the main character Rudeus, into the 2nd season as well. Uchiyama noted the anime attracted several fans and thus wanted to avoid disappointing them with her portrayal.

In the English dub of the series, the character is voiced by Ben Phillips; as his former self and Madeleine Morris in his reborn persona. In November 2021, Morris claimed she grew fond of Rudeus due to all the hidden depths he has, which leaves his traumatic past as a mystery.

== Role in the series ==
Rudeus is a hopeless man who dies after having a sad and withdrawn life and reincarnates in a fantasy world while keeping his memories, he determined to enjoy his new life without regrets under the name Rudeus Greyrat. He lives with his father Paul, his mother Zenith, his younger sister Norn, and even Lilia, a maid who was pregnant by Paul and gave birth to his younger half-sister Aisha. Due to inherited affinity and early training, Rudeus becomes highly skilled at magic. During his childhood, he becomes a student of a Migurd mage named Roxy Migurdia, a friend to an Elf named Sylphiette, and a magic teacher to noble heiress Eris Boreas Greyrat. The Mushoku Tensei series is divided in several story arcs that follow Rudeus's coming-of-age from an infant surpassing his Hikikomori fears while learning magic from Roxy.

Rudeus starts a journey across the world as a major magical catastrophe destroys his nation, teleporting and stranding hundreds of thousands of people far from home. He meets a strange Human figure called Hitogami, who often guides him In the last chapter of the "Boyhood arc", Rudeus becomes intimate with Eris but she abandons him shortly without word, making him believe he was rejected. In the "Adolescence arc", the depressed Rudeus continues his journey to find his missing mother and forms new allies. Rudeus and Elinalise enroll into Ronoa Magic University to cure his erectile dysfunction. As he befriends several students, Rudeus also develops feelings for his superior Fitz who is actually Sylphiette in disguise. As time passes, Sylphiette tries to seduce Rudeus who discovers her identity. With the two retaining their love since their childhoods, Rudeus and Sylphiette become intimate, allowing the former to surpass his impotence and they get married.

A few months later, Sylphiette gets pregnant with their child, but Rudeus receives a letter from his father Paul, asking for his help to rescue his mother Zenith, who is trapped inside a labyrinth in the distant Bengaritt Continent, and sending his sisters Norn and Aisha with him to look after them. Ignoring Hitogami's warnings to not leave home, Rudeus attends to his father's request and join the search party. He also reunites with his magic teacher Roxy and the two get close. Rudeus joins Paul and their party to fight and defeat a hydra in the deepest part of the labyrinth to rescue Zenith, but he loses his left hand and his father is killed in the occasion after Roxy begins to develop feelings for a sad Rudeus. Back to his home, Rudeus, with consent from Sylphiette, takes Roxy as his second wife and witnesses the birth of his first child named Lucy.

In the "Adulthood arc", Rudeus lives happily with his wifes Sylphiette and Roxy, his daughter Lucy, his mothers Zenith and Lilia and sisters Norn and Aisha, and his friends embarking on new adventures after obtaining a prosthetic left hand. He discovers that his life is about to take an unexpected turn when he's visited by a unknown stranger, who turns out to be an older version of himself, who came to warn him of a tragic future, that everything he loves would be taken from him by someone he should never have trusted, who turned out to be Hitogami, who really wanted Roxy’s life, who discovered that she was pregnant. Being terrified by what will happen, Rudeus must do everything possible to save his future and ensure it doesn’t end in tragedy once again. For this, he heard about three things: asking Nanahoshi for advice, to have doubts about Hitogami and without becoming enemies with him, and finally to write a letter to Eris, who thought she had rejected and forgotten him but she had, in fact, loved him all this time. Wanting to protect his family, Rudeus decides to go and confront the Dragon God Orsted, who tried to finish him off years ago.

== Reception ==
At the 8th Anime Trending Awards, Rudeus was a nominee for "Best Boy" with Sugita and Uchiyama's performance also being nominated in 2022. He was still present in anime popularity polls by Anime Trending from 2021. He was ranked 5th in the popularity ranking of characters appearing in Mushoku Tensei by the Netorabo research team.

The initial response to Rudeus was generally negative, with Anime Feminist calling out his lust for women with the mention of lolicon in the novel, making him come across as disgusting. His first interactions with Roxy were also called out for how Rudeus takes advantage of his young age to accidentally spy on her while suggesting that she could be his future wife due to her antisocial personality. Anime News Network found Rudeus hard to sympathize, as in early chapters he barely develops connections, to the point he always refers to his parents by their names. However, the way Rudeus interacts with Roxy during his training as a mage was noted to benefit him, as thanks to her, he manages to mature and deal with his new life on a more positive note.

HITC found the anime properly followed the novel's narrative, most importantly Rudeus's coming-of-age story, which appealed to the audience. The character has also received user criticism in China for containing perceived misogynistic comments and content. The series includes sexually charged plot elements, like the main character stealing used underwear. Real Sound was concerned about how the narrative portrays Rudeus's previous life, as it appears to focus highly on retired school students and issues they had at school, comparing it to the famous isekai Re:Zero − Starting Life in Another World. Nevertheless, they noted the fact that Rudeus dedicates his new life to focus on surpassing his flaws, turning him into a more sympathetic main character.

Despite the several negative comments about Rudeus, his character progression led to praise. IGN praised the characterization of Rudeus for reincarnating in a life where he has to deal with the traumas of his previous life which were seen as harsh, accomplishing multiple goals in the process. In a general overview, Roxy's training of Rudeus was noted to have generated a major impact within light novels as a result of how much Rudeus matures accidentally when his mentor helps him deal with his fears of leaving his house, something that tormented him in his past life. The writer from Anime News Network described Rudeus as "a mean-spirited caricature of a pedophilic otaku" that contrast his growth in the narrative. In later story arcs from the series, Anime News Network acclaimed Rudeus's dilemma when dealing with his father on an antagonistic side on their a brief fight, Rudeus comes to sympathize with Paul, seeing his past sins on his own father and rather than attacking him again, he makes the peace he regretted not making in his past life. Although Rudeus sinks into depression when Eris leaves him, Anime News Network praised how Rudeus overcomes his situation on his own and leaves on a journey on his own which, according to the reviewer, helps to further develop himself as he continues facing his past life. Re:Zero − Starting Life in Another World novelist Tappei Nagatsuki said that one of the strongest points of Mushoku Tensei was the handling of Rudeus who is noted to suffer similarly to the main character from the visual novel Clannad.

Upon the reveal of Rudeus's teenage persona, Yahoo praised the design due to how striking it was and looked forward to his role in the second season. With the premiere of the anime's second season, But Why Though praised the writing as how the depressed Rudeus is able to continue working while becoming more social thanks to his new allies. The ending of the episode was praised as it highlighted Rudeus's growth when comparing the two seasons. Spiel Times noticed the character never used his actual power developed in the first season during the premiere and noticed such reason for that being his loneliness dilemma which they praised for the depth it helped to give the character. AnimeCorner found Rudeus's sense of departure from his lonely persona to be a major selling point of the season, as he gets over his apparent rejection from Eris despite finding his fighting sequences normal when compared with the works from the first season. Kotaku said that while Rudeus's story was meant for the sake of redemption, his arc in the second has a poor execution as he faces erectile dysfunction and depression by marrying both Sylphie and Roxy despite their mutual age gaps, making the story more problematic for the writer.

Irfan Ghani Muhammad from Universitas Kiai Haji Achmad Siddiq Jember noticed Mushoku Tensei often tests Rudeus's morality from different point of views. His fears of the outside world change when Roxy starts training him and takes him through a ride across the town which changes the protagonist's point of view of how society works. The scholar mentions that as Rudeus grows up, his morals change and are challenged by Ruijerd when it comes to the idea of killing other people, something which the former does not approve. This often leads to the main character thinking from another point of view to fill peaceful solutions to his problems with others, which expands on the idea of Rudeus becoming more active and mature than in his past life. Rudeus's style is challenged heavily when meeting Paul years after the family split and have a problem with their relationship. Once again, Rudeus thinks about his personal problems from his previous life and searches for the most adequate solution to solve his dilemma with Paul and form a more genuine bond with his father, staying true to his decision having less regrets. Mindo Manihar Pasaribu from State Islamic University of North Sumatera notes Rudeus, who was previously a cowardly, weak, insecure character into a hard-working, strong, or fearless character who is more confident and compassionate; This makes the novels of Mushoku Tensei served as a major appeal to the audience.

=== Response by Rifujin na Magonote ===
The original author Rifujin na Magonote noted that there were several negative comments about how perverted Rudeus was in the series. In response, he said that in the series' beginning, he is "100%" perverted when being reborn and "0%" regarding seriousness. As a result, when the narrative progresses in the series, Rudeus becomes a more serious character but without erasing his original self. However, the anime omitted such event from the original novel, which makes the protagonist more perverted in comparison. In retrospect, when Rudeus lusts for Roxy in the first chapters, the author commented Rudeus was still not used to his new life and asked fans to look forward to future episodes where the protagonist starts developing more. When the anime was released, Rifujin na Magonote was surprised by the amount of negative comments by viewers. Still, he believes he managed to give Rudeus a good balance when it comes to his characterization.

During the release of the anime's second season, a student of Rudeus buys a slave. Rudeus connects with her and gives her a name, Juliette. This led to several fans asking on Twitter why was Rudeus approving such act; Rifujin said that Rudeus has no hatred towards the idea of slavery due to the world he is exposed in the narrative and how it clashes with his original values. Rifujin's comment attracted controversial and negative response in media, which led him to clarifying that he does not condone slavery and neither does his character as "the original story is written with a kind of mild setting where it is accepted that".
