= Rifujin na Magonote =

Japanese writer

- 理不尽な孫の手
- Born: April 3, 1985 (age 41); Gifu Prefecture, Japan
- Occupation: Novelist
- Writing career
- Genre: Fantasy
- Notable work: Mushoku Tensei

Rifujin na Magonote (Japanese: 理不尽な孫の手; lit. Unreasonable Backscratcher) is the pen name of a Japanese novelist who is best known for novel series Mushoku Tensei.

== Career ==
Magonote's interest in fiction began when he watched the 1995 animated film Whisper of the Heart while in elementary school. Upon entering junior high school, he joined the computer club where he began writing novels using a text editor and creating picture stories using PowerPoint. After graduating university in 2007, he began submitting manuscripts to publishers. After getting no results, he wanted to quit becoming an author. Some years later, he was reading Kanekiru Kogitsune's Re:Monster where he learned of the web fiction website Shōsetsuka ni Narō. After reading some of the serials on the website, thinking he would not be ridiculed for his writing, he began submitting there.

From 2012 to 2015, he began publishing the series Mushoku Tensei, which remained the number one ranked work on the site from October 2013 to February 2019. Mushoku Tensei was published under Media Factory imprint MF Books since January 2014. Since 2017, it has ranked highly in the annual Kono Light Novel ga Sugoi! (Note: 4th (2017), 7th (2018), 8th (2019), 4th (2020), 5th (2023) (Tankōbon editions)) It has received a manga adaptation, an anime, and been translated into English.

== Personal life and influences ==
"Rifujin na Magonote" is a combination of two out of five previous pen names he has used online. Magonote is a fan of Satoshi Mizukami, mentioning the series Lucifer and the Biscuit Hammer as influencing his own work. He is also influenced by fantasy video game series such as Dragon Quest and Final Fantasy.

He is friends with fellow Shōsetsuka ni Narō writers Tappei Nagatsuki, Natsume Akatsuki, Kugane Maruyama and Carlo Zen, who all debuted around the same time as him. They have shared copies of their new releases with each other and until 2015, ran a communal chatroom together.

== Works ==
=== Novels ===
- Mushoku Tensei (無職転生 〜異世界行ったら本気だす〜, Mushoku Tensei: Isekai Ittara Honki Dasu) (Illustrated by Shirotaka, published by MF Books, 26 volumes, 2014 – 2022)
- Orc Eroica (オーク英雄物語 忖度列伝, О̄ku Eiyūmonogatari Sontaku Retsuden) (Illustrated by Asanagi, published by Fujimi Fantasia Bunko, 6 volumes, 2020 – ongoing)

=== Anime ===
- Mushoku Tensei (Supervising Director, Season 1 Episode 23 Screenplay)

=== Video games ===
- Mushoku Tensei (Original Game Scenario "Paul Gaiden" Supervising Director)
