= Orc Eroica =

Japanese light novel series

- First light novel volume cover

オーク英雄物語 忖度列伝 (Ōku Eiyū Monogatari Sontaku Retsuden)
- Genre: Fantasy; Romantic comedy
- Novel series
- Written by: Rifujin na Magonote
- Published by: Shōsetsuka ni Narō
- Original run: January 8, 2019 – present
- Light novel
- Written by: Rifujin na Magonote
- Illustrated by: Asanagi
- Published by: Fujimi Shobo
- English publisher: NA: Yen Press
- Imprint: Fujimi Fantasia Bunko
- Original run: July 17, 2020 – present
- Volumes: 8
- Manga
- Written by: Tsubakurō Shibata
- Published by: Kadokawa Shoten
- Imprint: Kadokawa Comics A
- Magazine: Young Ace Up
- Original run: December 17, 2020 – present
- Volumes: 2
- icon

Orc Eroica (Japanese: オーク英雄物語 忖度列伝, Hepburn: Ōku Eiyū Monogatari Sontaku Retsuden) is a Japanese light novel series written by Rifujin na Magonote and illustrated by Asanagi. It began serialization on the user-generated novel publishing website Shōsetsuka ni Narō in January 2019. It was later acquired by Fujimi Shobo who began publishing it under their Fujimi Fantasia Bunko imprint in July 2020. A manga adaptation illustrated by Tsubakurō Shibata began serialization on Kadokawa Shoten's Young Ace Up manga website in December 2020.

== Plot ==
A millennia ago, on the continent of Vastonia in another world, a long and devastating war broke out between the forces of Humans and Demons. Lord Geddigs, the leader of the Demon forces, gathered monstrous allies to fight by his side, the Coalition of Seven, which included Orcs, Ogres, Fairies, Harpies, Succubi and Lizardmen. Against them stood the Alliance of Four Races, which included Humans, Elves, Dwarves, and Beastkin. The war was won when Geddigs was killed by a commando team from the Alliance, and the Coalition disbanded and was forced to surrender unconditionally. In the aftermath, peace was established between the factions, and the former enemies now co-exist in a delicate but generally peaceful balance.

With the end of the war three years ago, however, the Orcs are slowly nearing the verge of extinction. Since their kind has no females, the Orcs must copulate with women from other races to produce offspring, which they did during the war by raping war prisoners. After the war, this practice was forbidden; while it was agreed that female criminals would be sent to the Orcs to compensate, the number of available candidates has been decreasing. Moreover, Orcs reaching their 30th year without having lost their virginity turn into Orc Wizards, who are somewhat valued for their magical powers but looked down on by Orc Warriors, who are proud of their fighting skills, strength, and virility.

Bash, an Orc hero of the war, is a virgin approaching the age of 30. To prevent his people from discovering this, he obtains his king's permission to search for a bride. Meanwhile, a group seeks to resurrect the Demon Lord and restart the war.

== Characters ==
=== Main characters ===
Bash
A 28-year-old Orc Warrior and seasoned veteran of the great war. He wields an enchanted greatsword, gifted to him for his achievements in that conflict. Superhumanly strong, but modest, stoic and honorable, his legendary reputation as a mighty warrior has passed even beyond the Orclands. Still a virgin because he refused to rape war prisoners, he embarks on a quest to find himself a wife among the other humanoid races on Vastonia. While he is unsuccessful in his initial approaches, his respectful behavior towards them nonetheless ends up impressing and inspiring his candidates.
Zell
An energetic, shrewd and cocky Fairy who served as a scout in the Coalition of Seven, and an old friend of Bash. Upon meeting him again by chance after he frees her from captivity by Humans, she joins him in his quest, providing good general knowledge about other cultures but rather dubious advice on how to approach a woman romantically. Like with all other fairies, the fairy dust Zell exudes has magical healing and vitalizing properties. She adores Bash, but because fairies have no clear gender, as well as her size, she cannot mate with him. She is known (among many other nicknames) as "Fake-Bait Zell" for her usual tactic of intentionally letting herself captured by an enemy and then calling her allies, particularly Bash, down on them.

=== Humans ===
Judith
A female junior knight and resident of the city of Krassel in the Human Realm. Initially, she is highly prejudiced against Orcs after her older sister, also a knight, was kidnapped by Orcs during the war and used for breeding until liberated, an ordeal which left her incurably traumatized. Judith's beauty and strong spirit make her Bash's first bridal candidate, but she refuses his advances. Her attitude towards him changes drastically, however, after he single-handedly saves her from captivity and rape by the rogue Orc Boggs.
Houston Jale
A high-ranking male knight in Krassel, a decorated hero of the war, and Judith's superior. Known as the "Pig Slayer" for his successful campaigns against the Orc forces, he still respects them and has even studied their culture. He has met Bash on the battlefield, and recognizing his honorable spirit, he is both respectful to him as a fellow warrior and fearful of the consequences of Bash ever becoming agitated.
Nazar Liscia Gainius Grandolius / Errol
The second prince of the Human Nation and a member of the Alliance's four heroes team who killed Geddigs. Also known as the "Heaven-Sent Prince" and the "Cloudbreak Prince", he wields the Sun Sword, a legendary weapon of the Human's royal house which killed Geddigs. After the war, he has taken to wandering the lands under the assumed identity of Errol the bard, wearing a mask to hide his identity and working to promote peace between the former enemies of the Alliance and the Coalition. While as Errol he appears foppish, grandiloquent and totally untalented in the bardic skills, in secret Nazar and his old battlemate Thunder Sonia are looking out for elements trying to disrupt the new peace between the nations.
Liscia Gainius Grandolius / The Nameless Woman
Nazar's older twin sister who is believed killed during the great war. Nazar was close to her despite a certain rivalry between them, and he assumed her name after her demise to keep her memory and her wish for a peaceful world alive. After the war, Liscia re-emerges as an enigmatic, ruthless Human warrior woman with a hideously scarred face. She belongs to a secret organization intending to resurrect the Demon Lord Geddigs by stealing the eldritch cores of sacred sites in the realms of the Coalition. She is also responsible for killing the Ogre heroine Rula Rula, sending her adopted children Ludo and Luca in pursuit of revenge against her.
Breeze Kugel
A Magic Knight (a knight capable of using arcane magic) known under the title The Strangler. Bash meets him in the Elf lands while both are looking for a bride among the Elves, only to be disappointed. He later joins Bash in his fight against Gandaguza's Orc zombie horde encroaching on the Elven country, forming a brothers-in-arms friendship with him.
Bly
A Human wizard who gained notoriety during the great war as the leader of the Alliance's intelligence division. A master at information gathering, his achievements have resulted in the thwarting of many of the Coalition's campaigns. Now known as the "Great Merchant Bly" and "Paper Mage Bly", he makes his living by publishing magazines centered on romance and marriage, which given his reputation have become strong sellers in the Alliance territories.

=== Elves ===
Thunder Sonia / Aurantiaca
An Elf Mage who also fought in the great war, and a member of the Alliance's hero team who took down Geddigs. She is over 1,200 years old (whereas the rest of her people reach an average lifespan of 500), ever since she used dark magic to reverse and then halt her aging in order to lead the Elf army to victory. Her byname is derived from the trademark thunderstrikes she uses in battle. While widely regarded as a great hero in the Elf country, she is still single - both because of her unusually high age, and the fact that at the end of the war, she had met Bash on the battlefield. She was defeated by him, but instead of violating her, Bash had walked away, too dazed from his injuries to carry on. This being totally contrary to the Orcs' usual treatment of female prisoners, it gained Sonia, to her unending frustration, an unwanted reputation as an "old woman whose age smell would even repel an Orc". After meeting Bash on his wiving quest three years later (and becoming its main objective), she ends up fighting by his side against the Orc lich Gandaguza and the army of Orc zombies he has raised. When he proposes to her afterwards, her pent-up nervousness gets the better of her despite her newfound admiration for Bash, and she rejects him, although this incident ends up (somewhat) restoring her reputation. Afterwards, she joins her wartime companion Nazar in rooting out elements intending to disurpt the new peace, using the masked alias of Aurantiaca.
Bougainvillea
The leader of an assassination squad during the war, and Acontium's childhood friend. She is madly in love with Acontium, and upon learning of his impending marriage with Beast-Kin princess Innuella, her jealousy drives her into joining a conspiracy against this union, infiltrating the Beast-Kin Kingdom and try to assassinate a member of its nobility in order to see the wedding cancelled, until Thunder Sonia manages to talk her down and takes her in as her assistant.
Azalea
A female Elf warrior and veteran of the great war, who bears a large burn scar on her face. She is notorious under the nickname "Azalea the Hyena" because of the manic bloodthirst she displayed during the fightings; but upon finding a husband after the war's end, she has mellowed considerably. She is the first Elf approached by Bash for marriage, and while she politely turns him down, she is able to give him a valuable piece of advice.
Acontium
A captain in the Elf nation's army, the designated heir to the Elf Nation's throne, and Sonia's grandnephew and bodyguard. He has fallen in love with Innuella, the third daughter of the king of the Beastkin.
Calendula
A general in the Elven army.
Leucanthemum
The king of the Elves. In view of the Elves' lack of males to propagate their kind following the war, he has successfully lobbied for interracial marriages between the normally xenophobic Elves and other races, particularly humans.

=== Dwarves ===
Primera
A female Half-Dwarf weaponsmith. Despite being quite beautiful, she is prejudiced against by her community due to her half-Human heritage. Eager to prove her talent as a smith at an armament festival, she asks Bash to be her champion in the festival and showcase the quality of her weapons. He helps her out; but when her weapons and armor fail to endure the stress of combat, she realizes that her smithing talent does not live up to her stubborn pride yet. And after witnessing Bash stoically enduring her impatience, she eventually falls genuinely in love with him, but he misunderstands her proposal and takes his leave.
Doradora Dobanga
A Dwarf hero and Battlelord, and Primera's father. Highly successful as a weaponsmith, he died while battling Geddigs as a member of the four heroes of the Alliance.
Barabara Dobanga
Doradora Dobanga's firstborn son, Primera's half-brother, and celebrated arena champion who fights and is beaten by Bash during the tournament's semifinals.

=== Beastkin ===
Silviana Rivergold
The fifth and second-youngest of the Beastkin Kingdom's princesses. Having adored her uncle Leto, his death made her emotionally hardened, reckless and afire with vengeance against Bash, his killer. When Bash arrives in her kingdom to seek a bride, she begins flirting with him in order to lure him into a trap and use this as an excuse to ignite a war against the Orcs. The Succubus Carrot uses Silviana's hatred to trick her and obtain a holy item she needs to resurrect Demon Lord Geddigs. After Bash intervenes and drives Carrot off, Silviana realizes her mistake and shamefully refuses his proposal to her after confessing and apologizing to him.
Innuella Rivergold
The third princess of the Beastkin's Rivergold royal family, and Acontium's fiancée.
Queen Leona Rivergold
Silviana's mother and the queen of the Beastkin Kingdom.
Taiga Rivergold
Queen Leona's prince consort, who was killed in the great war.
Reese Rivergold
The first princess of the Beastkin and Queen Leona's successor to the throne.
Lavina, Quina and Fululu Rivergold
The second, fourth and sixth princess of the Beastkin royal family, respectively.
Leto Rivergold
The younger brother of Beastkin Queen Leona, and one of the four heroes of the Alliance who killed Geddigs. Right afterwards, he and Thunder Sonia faced Bash in combat, and he was killed by the Orc Hero while covering Nazar and Sonia's escape; but instead of claiming Leto's corpse, Bash left it behind following orders to recover Geddig's body first; a deed for which Leto's nieces, the Rivergold princesses, have resented Bash.
Gordon the Fairy Eater
A Beastkin warrior who earned his title from his perverse habit of eating captured Fairies during the war. However, when he captured Zell after she had ended up sweating following a hard day of battle and taste-licked her, he ended up so violently sick that he lost his appetite for Fairies, earning Zell the nickname "Gutwrecker" among the Beastkin.

=== Ogres ===
Ludo and Luca
Two adolescent twin Half-Ogres, and the adopted children of the Ogre heroine Rula Rula. They are the children of two turncoat spies - an Ogre and a Human - who worked for the Alliance and were killed after being found out. After her adopted mother is killed by an assassin, they set out to avenge her murder and encounter Bash near the border to the Succubus Country. Upon his insistence, Ludo becomes Bash's first apprentice so he can personally take the fight to the murderess. Luca, on the other hand, adores Bash and offers herself to him in return for helping them take revenge on the assassin, but she is too young for the Orc Hero to consider taking her as his wife. But after realizing that their goal to avenge Rula Rula is unattainable as things are right now, they abandon their immediate pursuit, although they resolve to fulfill their vows once they are of the right age.
Rula Rula
A powerful Ogress fighter from the great war. She was known as "Frozen Eye Rula Rula", because of her third eye on her forehead which could create ice projectiles.

=== Orcs ===
Nemesis
The incumbent Orc King. He is the only one of his people to know about the reason for Bash's quest after the latter turned to him for permission to leave the Orclands. In return for this trust, Bash intones Nemesis' name to affirm a solemn oath whenever needed.
Boggs
A former chief and general of the Orc forces during the war, and a skilled Beast Master specialized in training bugbears. Resentful of Nemesis' peaceful politics after the war, he left the Orclands and joined forces with a team of Human bandits, using his trained bugbears to wreak havoc on the Human Realm's trading routes. After capturing Judith, he prepares to rape her when he is hindered by Bash and killed after a vicious swordfight.
Gandaguza
A 10-foot-tall Orc Wizard and advisor to Chief Baraben during the great war. He fell on Elven lands when the Elves launched a surprise night attack on Baraben's camp, but his magic resurrected him and the Orc army he marched with as an undead horde to take revenge on the Elves. But after Bash intervenes and destroys Baraben, Gandaguza allows Bash to kill him as well.
Baraben
An Orc clan chief, childhood friend of Nemesis, and Bash's personal idol. He fought and fell alongside Gandaguza, and is later raised as a lich alongside his former army by Gandaguza's magic. When he ends up threatening Thunder Sonia, Bash faces and decapitates him in a hard-fought duel.
Donzoi
An old comrade-in-arms of Bash. He went rogue after the war, was captured by the Dwarves and enslaved as a gladiator. When Bash comes to the Dwarf Realm and champions Primera in an armament tournament, Donzoi ends up fighting Bash in the final match and winning by default after Bash's sword is snapped. As his prize, he asks for his and the other gladiators' liberation from slavery, and returns to his home, where he keeps spreading (and embellishing) Bash's legend.

=== Succubi ===
Carrot
A purple-haired Succubus known as "The Breathstealer", and an old battlemate of Bash. While they are attracted to each other, she does not fulfill the conditions for his quest because Succubi cannot bear children with mortal partners and an Orc does not actually lose his verginity by having sex with one. She is part of the underground conspiracy intent on bringing Geddigs back to life, mainly because of her concern for her people, who, similar to the Orcs, are dying out from lack of male life energy to feed on due to the conditions of the peace contract.
Curly Kale
The reigning queen of the succubi. Like most of her people, she is highly respectful towards Bash after he singlehandedly saved her army during the war. To feed her people, she has established a special "cafeteria" where men are kept and pampered like lifestock, but become unhealthy from obesity in the process; but upon Ludo's suggestion, a fitness program is eventually implemented to keep the "feeding stock" healthy.
Venus
A petite, pink-haired Succubus whose most notable feature is her missing right-side wing and tail, which she lost in the great war. When Bash visits her country, she is assigned to him as a guide by her queen.
Nion
A succubus and facility director for the feeding cafeteria.

=== Demons ===
Geddigs
A Demon Lord and the instigator of the great war, whose death ended the conflict. However, a faction of secret loyalists seek to resurrect him.
Sequence
Once one of Geddigs's most notorious generals, titled the Dark General, Sequence has become the Demon Realm's effective regent after the Demon Lord's demise. When Bash comes to the Demon Lands, he asks Sequence for the hand of one of his daughters in return for killing a dragon terrorizing the land.
Propraktika
A Demon mage known under the title "Shadow Vortex", and Sequence's daughters. She is part of the secret conspiracy determined to return Geddigs to the mortal world.
Asmonadia
One of Sequence's daughters, also known under the titulation "Dusk Lightning" for her fighting skills, who undertook a mission to slay the dragon (Eyes) plagueing their land. As the only survivor, and burned beyond recognition, she is rescued by Bash and brought back to her father. After her full restoration, she feels obligated to marry the Orc Hero, if only for her ambition to make it on her own as the prospective Queen of the Orcs, and follows him after he leaves the Demonlands following Eye's departure.
Rimendia
One of Sequence's daughters who died in the aftermath of the great war.
Neverthanks
A general of the Demon army, also known by his title "Mightysword" for the four magical blades he wields. He is also part of the secret conspiracy.

=== Dragons ===
Eyes
A female red dragon. After her best friend Bones was killed, she went on a revenge campaign against humans and humanoids, whom she holds responsible for Bones' death. When confronted and heavily wounded by Bash, she used a magic she had never used before on herself in an attempt to escape his cutches, turning herself into a demon woman in the process. When Bash, who doesn't recognize her, proposes to her, she accepts, but then reveals her true shape to him and leaves to prepare for the next mating season, leaving him utterly baffled.
Bones
A female dragon who befriended Eyes and had a fascination for mortal creatures. She assisted the humans during the great war, but was killed by Bash, which earned him the title "Dragon Decapitator".

== Media ==
=== Light novel ===
Written by Rifujin na Magonote, Orc Eroica began serialization on the user-generated novel publishing website Shōsetsuka ni Narō on January 8, 2019. It was later acquired by Fujimi Shobo who began releasing it with illustrations by Asanagi under their Fujimi Fantasia Bunko light novel imprint on July 17, 2020. Eight volumes have been released as of July 2026. The series is licensed in English by Yen Press.

| No. | Original release date | Original ISBN | North American release date | North American ISBN |
|---|---|---|---|---|
| 1 | July 17, 2020 | 978-4-04-073665-5 | November 23, 2021 | 978-1-9753-3433-8 |
| 2 | December 19, 2020 | 978-4-04-073666-2 | April 26, 2022 | 978-1-9753-4304-0 |
| 3 | November 20, 2021 | 978-4-04-074184-0 | December 13, 2022 | 978-1-9753-4847-2 |
| 4 | November 18, 2022 | 978-4-04-074605-0 | March 26, 2024 | 978-1-9753-9148-5 |
| 5 | September 20, 2023 | 978-4-04-075013-2 | October 15, 2024 | 978-1-9753-9378-6 |
| 6 | July 20, 2024 | 978-4-04-075500-7 | February 10, 2026 | 979-8-8554-1764-7 |
| 7 | June 20, 2025 | 978-4-04-075941-8 | December 8, 2026 | 979-8-8554-3793-5 |
| 8 | July 17, 2026 | 978-4-04-076444-3 | — | — |

=== Manga ===
A manga adaptation illustrated by Tsubakurō Shibata began serialization on Kadokawa Shoten's Young Ace Up manga website on December 17, 2020. The manga's chapters have been collected into two tankōbon volumes as of May 2024.

| No. | Release date | ISBN |
|---|---|---|
| 1 | December 10, 2021 | 978-4-04-111580-0 |
| 2 | May 10, 2024 | 978-4-04-113358-3 |
