= Mushoku Tensei =

Japanese light novel series and its franchise

- Mushoku Tensei: Jobless Reincarnation
- First light novel volume cover, featuring Paul Greyrat, Lilia (top row), Roxy Migurdia, Rudeus Greyrat, Zenith Greyrat, and Sylphiette (bottom row)

無職転生 〜異世界行ったら本気だす〜 (Mushoku Tensei: Isekai Ittara Honki Dasu)
- Genre: Fantasy; Harem; Isekai
- Novel series
- Written by: Rifujin na Magonote
- Published by: Shōsetsuka ni Narō
- Original run: November 22, 2012 – April 3, 2015
- Volumes: 25
- Light novel
- Written by: Rifujin na Magonote
- Illustrated by: Shirotaka
- Published by: Media Factory
- English publisher: NA: Seven Seas Entertainment
- Imprint: MF Books
- Original run: January 24, 2014 – November 25, 2022
- Volumes: 26
Further information
Manga
Written by	Rifujin na Magonote
Illustrated by	Yuka Fujikawa
Published by	Media Factory
English publisher	NA: Seven Seas Entertainment
Magazine	Monthly Comic Flapper
Original run	May 2, 2014 – present
Volumes	25
Novel series
Mushoku Tensei: Redundant Reincarnation
Written by	Rifujin na Magonote
Published by	Shōsetsuka ni Narō
Original run	May 19, 2015 – September 9, 2017
Volumes	9
Audio drama
Mushoku Tensei: Isekai Ittara Honki Dasu – Ten'i Meikyū-hen
Studio	Frontier Works
Released	April 26, 2017
Manga
Mushoku Tensei: Roxy Gets Serious
Written by	Rifujin na Magonote
Illustrated by	Shoko Iwami
Published by	Kadokawa Shoten
English publisher	NA: Seven Seas Entertainment
Magazine	ComicWalker
Original run	December 21, 2017 – July 14, 2023
Volumes	12
Manga
Mushoku Tensei: 4-koma ni Natte mo Honki Dasu
Written by	Rifujin na Magonote
Illustrated by	Nogiwa Kaede
Published by	ASCII Media Works
Magazine	Comic Dengeki Daioh "g"
Original run	October 25, 2018 – August 27, 2020
Volumes	3
Manga
Mushoku Tensei: Isekai Ittara Honki Dasu – Anthology
Written by	Rifujin na Magonote
Illustrated by	Various artists
Published by	Media Factory
Imprint	MFC
Original run	March 22, 2019 – December 23, 2020
Volumes	3
Video game
Mushoku Tensei: Game ni Natte mo Honki Dasu
Developer	Aiming Co., Ltd.
Publisher	Beaglee Co., Ltd.
Genre	RPG
Platform	Android, iOS
Released	March 27, 2021
Manga
Mushoku Tensei: Isekai Ittara Honki Dasu – Shitsui no Majutsushi-hen
Written by	Rifujin na Magonote
Illustrated by	Kazusa Yoneda
Published by	NTT Solmare
Magazine	Comic Cmoa
Original run	December 20, 2021 – present
Volumes	3
Manga
Mushoku Tensei: Eris Sharpens Her Fangs
Written by	Rifujin na Magonote
Illustrated by	Take Higake
Published by	Square Enix
English publisher	NA: Square Enix
Magazine	Gangan Online
Original run	March 15, 2022 – October 11, 2022
Volumes	1
Light novel
Mushoku Tensei: Jobless Reincarnation – Recollections
Written by	Rifujin na Magonote
Illustrated by	Shirotaka
Published by	Media Factory
English publisher	NA: Seven Seas Entertainment
Imprint	MF Books
Published	March 25, 2022
Light novel
Mushoku Tensei: Jobless Reincarnation – A Journey of Two Lifetimes [Special Book]
Written by	Rifujin na Magonote
Illustrated by	Shirotaka
Published by	Media Factory
English publisher	NA: Seven Seas Entertainment
Imprint	MF Books
Published	November 25, 2022
Light novel
Mushoku Tensei: Redundant Reincarnation
Written by	Rifujin na Magonote
Illustrated by	Shirotaka
Published by	Media Factory
English publisher	NA: Seven Seas Entertainment
Imprint	MF Books
Original run	June 23, 2023 – present
Volumes	3
Video game
Mushoku Tensei: Jobless Reincarnation – Quest of Memories
Developer	Lancarse
Publisher	Bushiroad Games
Genre	RPG
Platform	Microsoft Windows, Nintendo Switch, PlayStation 4, PlayStation 5
Released	June 20, 2024
Anime television series
Mushoku Tensei: Jobless Reincarnation
- icon

Mushoku Tensei: Jobless Reincarnation (Note: Japanese: 無職転生 〜異世界行ったら本気だす〜, Hepburn: Mushoku Tensei: Isekai Ittara Honki Dasu; lit. 'Jobless Reincarnation: If (I) Go to Another World, (I) Will Make a Serious Effort') is a Japanese light novel series written by Rifujin na Magonote (Note: Japanese: 理不尽な孫の手; lit. 'Unreasonable Backscratcher') and illustrated by Shirotaka. The series follows Rudeus Greyrat, a jobless, overweight, and reclusive man who dies and is reincarnated in a fantasy world. Retaining the memories from his previous life, he is determined to enjoy his new life without any regrets.

The series was originally published online at Shōsetsuka ni Narō in November 2012. The following year, Media Factory's MF Books imprint announced a print edition with illustrations by Pixiv user Shirotaka. (Note: シロタカ, Shiro Taka; "White Hawk") A manga adaptation by Yuka Fujikawa began serialisation in the June 2014 issue of Monthly Comic Flapper, and three spin-offs were also released. Seven Seas Entertainment licensed the tankōbon volumes of the manga for North America along with the original light novels. Studio Bind produced an anime television series adaptation. The first season aired between January and December 2021. The second season aired from July 2023 to July 2024. The third season premiered in July 2026.

== Plot ==
An unnamed 34-year-old NEET (Not in Education, Employment, or Training) is evicted from his home. As he wanders the streets, he laments his life and wishes to start over. Simultaneously, he sees a group of teenagers quarrelling, and is reminded of a childhood friend he had feelings for in middle school. When a speeding truck threatens to hit them, he pushes them out of the way and dies in the process.

He awakens in a baby's body and realizes he has been reincarnated into a magical world of swords and sorcery. Determined to make the most of this second chance, he discards his past identity to embrace a new life as Rudeus Greyrat. Due to inherited affinity and early training, Rudeus becomes highly skilled in magic. During his childhood, he studies under the mage Roxy Migurdia, befriends an elf named Sylphiette, and becomes a magic tutor to noble heiress Eris Boreas Greyrat.

Just as Rudeus begins to feel like he has found his place in this world, a major magical catastrophe destroys his nation, teleporting and stranding hundreds of thousands of people far from home. Some end up in dangerous places or situations, resulting in their deaths due to murder, war, execution, monster attacks, or exposure to the elements. Stranded in a foreign land with Eris, Rudeus begins the journey home with the help of a noble warrior named Ruijerd Superdia. During their travels, Rudeus is approached by a mysterious entity called Hitogami, who offers cryptic advice with unclear motives. After three years, including a defeat by a powerful warrior named Orsted, Rudeus successfully escorts Eris home to their devastated homeland. However, political tensions and a misunderstanding lead to Eris's sudden departure, leaving Rudeus heartbroken.

Two years later, Rudeus, still affected by the fallout of the incident with Eris, suffers from erectile dysfunction. He enrolls in Ranoa Magic University following advice from Hitogami. There, he reunites with Sylphiette, who helps him recover. The two marry shortly thereafter. Rudeus later joins his father's quest to find his missing mother, ignoring Hitogami's advice. During the journey, he develops a romantic relationship with Roxy, who becomes his second wife. Orsted eventually warns him that Hitogami will be responsible for the deaths of those close to him. Rudeus attempts to kill Orsted but instead offers him his allegiance in exchange for his family's safety. After reconciling with Eris, Rudeus marries her as his third wife. The series continues based on Rudeus's daily life and growing family, along with his and Orsted's efforts to ensure Hitogami's precise demise. After an unsuccessful attempt on his life, Hitogami abandons his plans against Rudeus and shifts focus to his descendants. Rudeus eventually dies at the age of 74.

== Production ==
After graduating from university in 2007, Rifujin na Magonote began submitting manuscripts to publishers. After receiving no results, he decided to quit. Some years later, he was reading Kanekiru Kogitsune's Re:Monster, where he learned of the web fiction website Shōsetsuka ni Narō. After reading some of the serials on the website and thinking he would not be ridiculed for his writing, he began submitting there. Magonote wanted to depict a student who fails at school, trying to have another chance at life through this series. The setting of the work was created by adding elements of several popular Naro-kei works to the story that he had wanted to write for a long time. From then on, Isekai stories were popular and the approach was "If I were you, I would do this", "If I'm going to be reincarnated, I should write about my childhood properly" or "Is it possible to make use of the settings before reincarnation?" During his youth, Magonote was a fan of fighting games in arcades. He often regretted leaving his hometown and he channeled that sorrow as a driving force when he began writing Mushoku Tensei, aiming to overcome his past difficulties and see the story to its end. Magonote says his influences were Lucifer and the Biscuit Hammer and Parasyte, which focused on family and human relationships.

Magonote commented that he made Rudeus aware of his controversial personality and intended for Rudeus's actions to become more meaningful in the process. He left it to the readers to judge him. Magonote wanted the audience to pay attention so they could relate to him. He got a great response in episodes 6 and 7 of the web version of the novels when Roxy took Rudeus out. This acceptance made him think, "Let's grow in this direction." The message of the series is that "everybody can make mistakes."

After publishing the first parts of his work, Magonote wrote that he intended the series to last at least a hundred chapters. Due to criticism of his work, Magonote considered ending the series prematurely but decided to continue when it topped Syosetu's daily rankings. Originally, the story arc, in which Rudeus reunites with Aisha, was supposed to be completely different from the published work. Magonote intended to have Lilia die off-screen, with Aisha hiding under a different identity. He decided against Lilia's death and rewrote the story arc to make sense of her survival and lack of contact. Magonote stated the story arc might be bizarre due to the changes, but expressed no regrets; he noted Lilia's survival made him reconsider Zenith's condition in the story. The climax was influenced by Tappei Nagatsuki's Re:Zero. Regarding the ending of this novel, Magonote was thinking of writing until Rudeus died, and at the same time, writing until Rudeus turned 34 because he died at the age of 34. He has also said that since the prologue is about an unemployed man who is kicked out of his house, he did not want the story to end with someone being beaten up.

Magonote intended to create a sequel to the web novel series based on the Six-Sided Universe. On January 15, 2021, Magonote announced that he plans to finish the Orc Eroica web novel first. Due to his health problems, its completion has been delayed.

== Media ==
=== Web novel and light novel ===
Rifujin na Magonote published his work on the online web novel website, Shōsetsuka ni Narō; the chapters were uploaded from November 22, 2012, to April 3, 2015. In November 2013, the author announced his work would be released as a light novel under Media Factory's MF Books imprint. The illustrator for the light novel is a Pixiv user called Shirotaka. The series was published in 26 light novel volumes from January 24, 2014, to November 25, 2022, with the seventh volume completely original.

A spin-off after-story series, Mushoku Tensei: Redundant Reincarnation (無職転生 – 蛇足編, Mushoku Tensei – Dasoku-hen; lit. "Jobless Reincarnation: Redundancy"), was published as nine short stories on Shōsetsuka ni Narō from May 19, 2015, to September 9, 2017 (with the seventh story, "The Day Aisha Quit Being a Maid", removed shortly after publication). Media Factory will publish Redundant Reincarnation in four volumes from June 23, 2023, to November 25, 2026, with the first two volumes containing three web stories and an additional original short story each, the fourth two republished and one new, and the third, "Jobless Red Carpet", being a rewrite of "The Day Aisha Quit Being a Maid."

Two companion volumes were published by Media Factory on March 25 and November 25, 2022, respectively: Mushoku Tensei: Jobless Reincarnation – Recollections (無職転生 ～異世界行ったら本気だす～ リコレクション, Mushoku Tensei ~ Isekai Ittara Honki Dasu ~ Recollection) (a digital compilation of 32 short stories set between the first ten volumes of the series, with a new short story exclusive to the collection and an interview with Rifujin na Magonote) and Mushoku Tensei: Jobless Reincarnation – A Journey of Two Lifetimes [Special Book] (無職転生 ～異世界行ったら本気だす～ スペシャルブック, Mushoku Tensei ~ Isekai Ittara Honki Dasu ~ Special Book) (featuring series chronology, a special manga from the artists adapting the series, 40 short stories (including five new ones) and an interview with Shirotaka).

Seven Seas Entertainment has licensed the light novels for publication in North America and published the series from 2019 to 2024. They made localization changes in their translations of the light novels, such as toning down Rudeus's perverted behavior and removing references to rape. They later decided to "re-evaluate" their localization decisions. An audiobook version of the series narrated by Cliff Kurt was released by Seven Seas Entertainment in 2023 and 2024. Seven Seas Entertainment also released Recollections (digitally and as an audiobook), A Journey of Two Lifetimes and the first volume of Redundant Reincarnation in 2024.

=== Manga ===
The May 2014 issue of Monthly Comic Flapper announced that the manga adaptation of Mushoku Tensei by Yuka Fujikawa would premiere in the June issue. Though Yuka is the author of the manga series, character designs are credited to Shirotaka. Media Works collected the individual chapters into tankōbon volumes; the first volume was released on October 23, 2014. In 2015, Seven Seas Entertainment began publishing the manga series in North America.

A second manga series illustrated by Kazusa Yoneda, titled Mushoku Tensei: Isekai Ittara Honki Dasu – Shitsui no Majutsushi-hen (無職転生 ～異世界行ったら本気だす～ 失意の魔術師編; lit. "Jobless Reincarnation: Giving His Best When Transferred to Another World - The Depressed Magician Arc") began serialization on NTT Solmare's Comic Cmoa website on December 20, 2021. It adapts the light novel's seventh volume.

==== Spin-offs ====
A spin-off manga illustrated by Shoko Iwami, titled Mushoku Tensei: Roxy Gets Serious (無職転生 ～ロキシーだって本気です～, Mushoku Tensei: Rokishī Datte Honki Desu), was serialized online on Kadokawa Shoten's ComicWalker website from December 21, 2017, to July 14, 2023. Twelve tankōbon volumes were published from March 22, 2018, to August 23, 2023. Seven Seas Entertainment licensed the manga in September 2018 for print and digital release, and released it from April 30, 2019, to September 10, 2024.

A second spin-off manga illustrated by Kaede Nogiwa, titled Mushoku Tensei: 4-koma ni Natte mo Honki Dasu (無職転生 ～4コマになっても本気だす～; lit. "Jobless Reincarnation: I'll Be Serious Even in 4-koma"), was serialized in ASCII Media Works' Comic Dengeki Daioh "g" magazine from October 25, 2018, to August 27, 2020. Three tankōbon volumes were published from October 26, 2019, to December 26, 2020.

A third spin-off manga illustrated by Take Higake, titled Mushoku Tensei: Eris Sharpens Her Fangs (無職転生～エリスは本気で牙を砥ぐ～, Mushoku Tensei: Eris wa Honki de Kiba o Togu; lit. "Jobless Reincarnation: Eris Gets Serious About Sharpening Her Fangs"), was serialized online on Square Enix's Gangan Online service from March 15 to October 11, 2022. It was compiled into a single tankōbon volume, published on November 25 of the same year. Square Enix's Manga Up! service published the manga in English on November 24, 2023.

Media Factory published an anthology manga illustrated by various artists in three volumes: Side: Roxy on March 22, 2019, and Side: Eris and Side: Sylphie on December 23, 2020.

=== Audio drama ===
An audio drama adaptation, titled Mushoku Tensei: Isekai Ittara Honki Dasu – Ten'i Meikyū-hen (無職転生 ～異世界行ったら本気だす～ 転移迷宮編), was released by Frontier Works on April 26, 2017. The story involves Rudeus, who Hiro Shimono voiced. The actor enjoyed the work despite being unfamiliar with the novels. Still, he expressed difficulties in delivering certain lines where the character yells. Rudeus's father, Paul, was voiced by Eiji Takemoto, who wanted to connect with his "son" Shimono during the recording. Shimono stated that he felt the audio drama to be quite dark, despite his beliefs that the original novel was more comical.

=== Anime ===
In March 2019, the official website of MF Books announced that an anime adaptation of Mushoku Tensei would be produced. The anime was later announced on October 18, 2019, to be a television series directed by Manabu Okamoto and animated by Studio Bind, with Kazutaka Sugiyama designing the characters and Yoshiaki Fujisawa composing the music. Egg Firm is credited for production. The series was originally scheduled to premiere in 2020, but was delayed until January 2021. The first half aired from January 11 to March 22, 2021, on Tokyo MX, KBS, BS11, and SUN. (Note: Tokyo MX lists the series premiere at 24:00 on January 10, 2021, which is effectively 12:00 a.m. JST on January 11.) A second half was announced after the first half of the series on March 22, 2021. The second half was set to premiere in July 2021 but was delayed to October 2021. The second half aired from October 4 to December 20, 2021. (Note: Tokyo MX lists the second half premiere at 24:00 on October 3, 2021, which is effectively 12:00 a.m. JST on October 4.) Toho released both parts of the first season on Blu-ray across four volumes, with the first volume releasing on April 21, 2021. The anime's fourth Blu-ray volume was released on March 16, 2022, and included an unaired episode.

In March 2022, it was announced that a second season had been green-lit. It was directed by Hiroki Hirano, with scripts supervised by Toshiya Ono, and character designs handled by Sanae Shimada. The first part of the second season aired from July 3 to September 25, 2023. The opening theme song is "Spiral" by Longman, while the ending theme song is "Musubime" (ムスビメ) by Yuiko Ōhara. The second part aired from April 8 to July 1, 2024, with Ryōsuke Shibuya replacing Hirano as the director. The opening theme song is "On the Frontline" (オン・ザ・フロントライン) performed by Hitorie while the ending theme song is "Mamoritai Mono" (守りたいもの; lit. 'What I Want to Protect') performed by Yuiko Ōhara. The second season was collected into four Blu-ray volumes in Japan between October 18, 2023, and September 18, 2024.

A third season was announced following the airing of the second season's final episode. The first part aired from July 4 to September 28, 2026. The second part is set to premiere in 2027.

=== Video games ===
A smartphone game developed by Aiming Co., Ltd. titled Mushoku Tensei: Game ni Natte mo Honki Dasu (無職転生 ～ゲームになっても本気だす～; lit. "Jobless Reincarnation – I'll Seriously Try Even If It's Made Into a Game") was released on Android and iOS on March 27, 2021. The game ended service on August 31, 2022. The light novel artist served as supervisor, especially in the "Paul Gaiden" scenario.

A role-playing video game, titled Mushoku Tensei: Jobless Reincarnation – Quest of Memories, developed by Lancarse and published by Bushiroad Games, was released on June 20, 2024, for Microsoft Windows, Nintendo Switch, PlayStation 4, and PlayStation 5.

Characters of Mushoku Tensei have also appeared in the smartphone titles The Seven Deadly Sins: Grand Cross and Grand Summoners.

== Reception ==
Kono Light Novel ga Sugoi!, an annual light novel guidebook, ranked Mushoku Tensei as the fourth most popular manga in its 2017 edition. According to Syosetu's rankings, the web novel consistently appeared as the website's most popular work. The light novels have also appeared on Oricon's charts and ranked in T-site's novel popularity polls.

By August 2021, the light novel series had reached 8.5 million copies in circulation, increasing to over 13 million copies by June 2023, and to over 18 million by April 2026.

The main character of the series, Rudeus, has been criticized for being overtly perverted. Anime News Network found Rudeus difficult to sympathize with due to his immaturity. In addition, the novel has been criticized for its sexualization of underage characters.

Real Sound expressed concern about how the narrative portrays Rudeus's previous life, noting its heavy focus on reclusive former students and their issues as well as comparing it to the popular light novel series Re:Zero. Nevertheless, Rudeus's commitment to overcoming his flaws in his new life helped to make him a more sympathetic main character. Real Sound writer Niji Kusano stated that the key to Mushoku Tensei's success was Rudeus's achievements in his new life, despite this being a common isekai trope.

Tappei Nagatsuki, author of Re:Zero, commented that one of the strongest aspects of Mushoku Tensei is its handling of Rudeus, noting that he suffers similarly to the main character from the visual novel Clannad.
