= Crunchyroll Anime Award for Best Isekai Anime =

- Awarded for: Best isekai anime series of the previous year
- Country: United States; Japan
- First award: CloverWorks — The Promised Neverland (2020)
- Currently held by: White Fox — Re:Zero − Starting Life in Another World Season 3 (2026)

Highlights
- Most wins: Studio: White Fox (3); Anime: Re:Zero − Starting Life in Another World (3)
- Most nominations: Studio: MAPPA / Wit Studio (5); Anime: Mushoku Tensei: Jobless Reincarnation (4)
- Website: Crunchyroll Anime Awards

The Crunchyroll Anime Award for Best Isekai Anime, formerly known as Crunchyroll Anime Award for Best Fantasy, is a genre-specific award given at the Crunchyroll Anime Awards since its fourth edition in 2020. Originally given for best fantasy anime series, it was eventually removed or renamed starting in its ninth edition in 2025 (partially due to confusion over anime genres between fantasy and isekai). It is given for the best fantasy and isekai anime series from the previous year. Winners are determined through a combined voting process by judges and public voting.

The Promised Neverland by CloverWorks first won the award in 2020. Mushoku Tensei: Jobless Reincarnation, Re:Zero − Starting Life in Another World and That Time I Got Reincarnated as a Slime were the only three anime series to received nominations altogether in both categories, the latter two also were the previous respective winners of the Best Fantasy genre.

In the latest edition in 2026, the third season of Re:Zero − Starting Life in Another World by White Fox won the award.

== Winners and nominees ==
In the following list, the first titles listed in gold are the winners; those not in gold are nominees, which are listed in alphabetical order. The years given are those in which the ceremonies took place.

=== 2010s ===
Best Fantasy

| Year | Anime | Studio(s) |
2019 (4th)
| 2019 (4th) | The Promised Neverland | CloverWorks |
| 2019 (4th) | Ascendance of a Bookworm | Ajiado |
| 2019 (4th) | Astra Lost in Space | Lerche |
| 2019 (4th) | Attack on Titan (season 3) | Wit Studio |
| 2019 (4th) | Demon Slayer: Kimetsu no Yaiba | Ufotable |
| 2019 (4th) | Sarazanmai | MAPPA / Lapin Track |

=== 2020s ===
| Year | Anime | Studio(s) |
2020 (5th)
| 2020 (5th) | Re:Zero − Starting Life in Another World (season 2) | White Fox |
| 2020 (5th) | Ascendance of a Bookworm (season 2) | Ajiado |
| 2020 (5th) | Deca-Dence | NUT |
| 2020 (5th) | Dorohedoro | MAPPA |
| 2020 (5th) | Dragon Quest: The Adventure of Dai | Toei Animation |
| 2020 (5th) | Tower of God | Telecom Animation Film |
2021 (6th)
| 2021 (6th) | That Time I Got Reincarnated as a Slime (season 2) | Eight Bit |
| 2021 (6th) | Mushoku Tensei: Jobless Reincarnation (season 1 cour 1) | Studio Bind |
| 2021 (6th) | Ranking of Kings | Wit Studio |
| 2021 (6th) | The Case Study of Vanitas | Bones |
| 2021 (6th) | To Your Eternity | Brain's Base |
| 2021 (6th) | Wonder Egg Priority | CloverWorks |
2021/2022 (7th)
| 2021/2022 (7th) | Demon Slayer: Kimetsu no Yaiba Entertainment District Arc (season 2 cour 2) | Ufotable |
| 2021/2022 (7th) | Made in Abyss: The Golden City of the Scorching Sun (season 2) | Kinema Citrus |
| 2021/2022 (7th) | Mushoku Tensei: Jobless Reincarnation (cour 2) | Studio Bind |
| 2021/2022 (7th) | Overlord (season 4) | Madhouse |
| 2021/2022 (7th) | Ranking of Kings (cour 2) | Wit Studio |
| 2021/2022 (7th) | The Case Study of Vanitas (cour 2) | Bones |
2022/2023 (8th)
| 2022/2023 (8th) | Demon Slayer: Kimetsu no Yaiba Swordsmith Village Arc (season 3) | Ufotable |
| 2022/2023 (8th) | Hell's Paradise | MAPPA |
| 2022/2023 (8th) | Mashle: Magic and Muscles | A-1 Pictures |
| 2022/2023 (8th) | Mushoku Tensei: Jobless Reincarnation (season 2) | Studio Bind |
| 2022/2023 (8th) | Ranking of Kings: The Treasure Chest of Courage | Wit Studio |
| 2022/2023 (8th) | The Ancient Magus' Bride (season 2) | Studio Kafka |

Best Isekai Anime

| Year | Anime | Studio(s) |
2023/2024 (9th)
| 2023/2024 (9th) | Re:Zero − Starting Life in Another World (season 3) | White Fox |
| 2023/2024 (9th) | KonoSuba: God's Blessing on This Wonderful World! (season 3) | Drive |
| 2023/2024 (9th) | Mushoku Tensei: Jobless Reincarnation (season 2 cour 2) | Studio Bind |
| 2023/2024 (9th) | Shangri-La Frontier (season 2) | C2C |
| 2023/2024 (9th) | Suicide Squad Isekai | Wit Studio |
| 2023/2024 (9th) | That Time I Got Reincarnated as a Slime (season 3) | Eight Bit |
2025 (10th)
| 2025 (10th) | Re:Zero − Starting Life in Another World (season 3 cour 2) | White Fox |
| 2025 (10th) | Campfire Cooking in Another World with My Absurd Skill (season 2) | MAPPA |
| 2025 (10th) | Disney Twisted-Wonderland: The Animation — Season 1 "Episode of Heartslabyul" | Yumeta Company and Graphinica |
| 2025 (10th) | From Bureaucrat to Villainess: Dad's Been Reincarnated! | Ajiado |
| 2025 (10th) | KonoSuba: God's Blessing on This Wonderful World! Bonus Stage (season 3) | Drive |
| 2025 (10th) | Zenshu | MAPPA |

== Records ==
=== Anime series ===
Re:Zero − Starting Life in Another World holds the record for the most wins in an anime series.

Mushoku Tensei: Jobless Reincarnation holds the record for the most nominations–and also the most nominations without a win in an anime series.

| Franchise | Wins | Nominations | Seasons |
|---|---|---|---|
| Re:Zero − Starting Life in Another World | 3 | | Season 2, Season 3 cour 1, Season 3 cour 2 |
| Demon Slayer: Kimetsu no Yaiba | 2 | 3 | Unwavering Resolve Arc, Entertainment District Arc, Swordsmith Village Arc |
| That Time I Got Reincarnated as a Slime | 1 | 2 | Season 2, Season 3 |
| Mushoku Tensei: Jobless Reincarnation | 0 | 4 | Season 1 cour 1, Season 1 cour 2, Season 2 cour 1, Season 2 cour 2 |
| Ranking of Kings | 0 | 3 | Cour 1, Cour 2, The Treasure Chest of Courage |
| The Case Study of Vanitas | 0 | 2 | Cour 1, Cour 2 |
| KonoSuba: God's Blessing on This Wonderful World! | 0 | 2 | Season 3, Bonus Stage |

=== Studios ===
White Fox holds the record for the most wins in an anime studio.

MAPPA and Wit Studio holds the record for the most nominations–and also the most nominations without a win in an anime studio.

White Fox has the most wins in an anime studio with 3, with Re:Zero − Starting Life in Another World and Ufotable's Demon Slayer: Kimetsu no Yaiba were the only anime series to win multiple awards. The remaining studios (CloverWorks and Eight Bit) received a single award.

MAPPA and Wit Studio received the most nominations for an anime studio without a single win with 5. Mushoku Tensei: Jobless Reincarnation received four nominations, but did not win a single award.

| Studio | Wins | Nominations | Seasons |
|---|---|---|---|
| White Fox | 3 | | Re:Zero − Starting Life in Another World (Season 2, Season 3 cour 1, Season 3 cour 2) |
| Ufotable | 2 | 3 | Demon Slayer: Kimetsu no Yaiba (Unwavering Resolve Arc, Entertainment District Arc, Swordsmith Village Arc) |
| CloverWorks | 1 | 2 | The Promised Neverland, Wonder Egg Priority |
| Eight Bit | 1 | 2 | That Time I Got Reincarnated as a Slime (Season 2, Season 3) |
| MAPPA | 0 | 5 | Campfire Cooking in Another World with My Absurd Skill (Season 2), Dorohedoro, Hell's Paradise, Sarazanmai, Zenshu |
| Wit Studio | 0 | 5 | Attack on Titan (Season 3), Ranking of Kings (Cour 1, Cour 2, The Treasure Chest of Courage), Suicide Squad Isekai |
| Studio Bind | 0 | 4 | Mushoku Tensei: Jobless Reincarnation (Season 1 cour 1, Season 1 cour 2, Season 2 cour 1, Season 2 cour 2) |
| Ajiado | 0 | 3 | Ascendance of a Bookworm (Season 1, Season 2), From Bureaucrat to Villainess: Dad's Been Reincarnated! |
| Bones | 0 | 2 | The Case Study of Vanitas (Cour 1, Cour 2) |
| Drive | 0 | 2 | KonoSuba: God's Blessing on This Wonderful World! (Season 3, Bonus Stage) |
