= From Bureaucrat to Villainess =

Japanese manga series

- From Bureaucrat to Villainess: Dad's Been Reincarnated!
- First tankōbon volume cover

悪役令嬢転生おじさん (Akuyaku Reijō Tensei Oji-san)
- Genre: Comedy; Isekai
- Manga
- Written by: Michiro Ueyama
- Published by: Shōnen Gahōsha
- Imprint: Young King Comics
- Magazine: Young King Ours GH (March 16, 2020 – November 17, 2025); Comic Y-OURs (January 13, 2026 – present)
- Original run: March 16, 2020 – present
- Volumes: 11
- Anime television series
- Directed by: Tetsuya Takeuchi
- Written by: Shingo Irie
- Music by: Natsumi Tabuchi; Misaki Tsuchida; Tsugumi Tanaka; Reiko Abe; Kaho Sawada
- Studio: Ajiado
- Licensed by: Sentai Filmworks; SA/SEA: Muse Communication
- Original network: JNN (MBS, TBS)
- Original run: January 10, 2025 – March 28, 2025
- Episodes: 12
- icon

From Bureaucrat to Villainess: Dad's Been Reincarnated! (Note: Japanese: 悪役令嬢転生おじさん, Hepburn: Akuyaku Reijō Tensei Oji-san; lit. 'The Middle-Aged Man that Reincarnated as a Villainess') is a Japanese manga series written and illustrated by Michiro Ueyama. It was serialized in Shōnen Gahōsha's monthly seinen manga magazine Young King Ours GH from March 2020 to November 2025, and later transferred to the publisher's Comic Y-OURs website in January 2026; its chapters have been collected in eleven tankōbon volumes as of November 2026. An anime television series adaptation produced by Ajiado aired from January to March 2025.

== Premise ==
A bureaucrat named Kenzaburo Tondabayashi is killed by a passing truck after saving a boy and is reborn in the Otome game Magical Academy: Love & Beast as its villainess, Grace Auvergne. Due to his politeness, he makes Grace's personality change into a more kind person and even becomes friends with the game's heroine, Anna Doll, whom the original Grace is antagonistic towards. Meanwhile, Kenzaburo's original body is revealed to have survived, but he is stuck in a coma. His wife and daughter discover that he is trapped in the game and attempt to help him complete it in hopes of getting him out.

== Characters ==
Kenzaburo Tondabayashi (屯田林 憲三郎, Tondabayashi Kenzaburō)
Voiced by: Kazuhiko Inoue (Japanese); James Belcher, Joe Daniels (young) (English)
A 52-year old salaryman. After saving the life of a boy from being hit by a truck, he finds himself reincarnated into the video game of his daughter's favorite otome game Magical Academy: Love & Beast as the game's villainess, Grace Auvergne. Despite being knowledgeable about the villainess character during his youth, he is unfamiliar with the otome genre. Although he tries to act like a villainess, his politeness keeps getting in the way. Instead, he uses his lifelong skills as a salaryman and father to progress the game's storyline, unaware that he is significantly altering the game's plot. Thanks to the cheat skill, "Elegance Cheat", any physical actions he does as Grace turns out elegantly. In the real world, Kenzaburo is still alive but has fallen into a coma, unaware that his actions in the game world are being watched by his wife and daughter, who try to help him advance through the game so they can bring him back.
Grace Auvergne (グレイス・オーヴェルヌ, Gureisu Ōverunu)
Voiced by: M.A.O (Japanese); Rachael Messer, Alyssa Marek (young) (English)
The villainess of the Magical Academy: Love & Beast game, whose body has been possessed by Kenzaburo. In the game, Grace is Anna's rival, who treats her cruelly due to her commoner background. As a result of Kenzaburo's influence, Grace is much nicer and more friendly, much to the surprise of everyone who knew her. Instead of being Anna's rival, Grace becomes Anna's friend and mentor.
Anna Doll (アンナ・ドール, Anna Dōru)
Voiced by: Akira Sekine (Japanese); Cat Thomas (English)
The main character in the video game Magical Academy: Love & Beast. Due to Kenzaburo's actions where he treats Anna like a daughter instead of a villainess, she and Grace become friends instead of rivals.
Virgile Vierge (ヴィルジール・ヴィエルジ, Virujīru Vieruji)
Voiced by: Kaito Ishikawa (Japanese); Brandon Hearnsberger (English)
The crown prince, President of the Student council and Grace's fiancé. In the game, he was one of Anna's love interests. Although he did not show much love to Grace at first, he started to develop romance after seeing her change her ways.
Hinako Tondabayashi (屯田林 日菜子, Tondabayashi Hinako)
Voiced by: Tomoyo Kurosawa (Japanese); Karlii Hoch (English)
Kenzaburo's only daughter. A proud Otaku just like her parents, she is the first to discover her father is now the villainess Grace in her favorite video game and attempts to aid him so they can bring his mind back to the real world. While she cannot communicate with her father, the only thing she can do is control Orion, Grace's familiar.
Mitsuko Tondabayashi (屯田林 美津子, Tondabayashi Mitsuko)
Voiced by: Takako Honda (Japanese); Joanne Bonasso (English)
Kenzaburo's wife and Hinako's mother. Just like her husband and daughter, she is also an otaku and the second person to find out her husband is in her daughter's favorite video game. She works with her daughter to complete the game to bring her husband back to their world.
Richard Verseau (リシャール・ヴェルソー, Rishāru Verusō)
Voiced by: Yūichirō Umehara (Japanese); Alan Brincks (English)
The vice president of the Student Council.
Auguste Lion (オーギュスト・リオン, Ōgyusuto Rion)
Voiced by: Ryōta Suzuki (Japanese); Michael Wronski (English)
The head of the student council security division.
Pierre Gemeaux (ピエール・ジェモー, Piēru Jemō)
Voiced by: Takuma Nagatsuka (Japanese); James Marler (English)
The Student council secretary and Virgile's valet.
Lambert Balance (ランベール・バランス, Ranbēru Baransu)
Voiced by: Seiichiro Yamashita (Japanese); Dylan Godwin (English)
The student council treasurer.
Lucas Vierge (リュカ・ヴィエルジ, Ryuka Vieruji)
Voiced by: Aoi Koga (Japanese); Clint Bickham (English)
Virgile's younger brother and second prince of the kingdom.
Leopold Auvergne (レオポルド・オーヴェルヌ, Reoporudo Ōvuerunu)
Voiced by: Akio Otsuka
Grace's father. He serves as the kingdom's Minister of Finance.
Josette (ジョゼット, Jozetto)
Voiced by: Yū Sasahara (Japanese); Brittney Karbowski (English)
A cat girl and apprentice maid at Grace's household. She at first fears Grace due to her cruelty, but starts to warm up to her after seeing her personality change.
Francette Mercure (フランセット・メルキュール, Furansetto Merukyūru)
Voiced by: Yūki Kuwahara
A member of the Drama club. In the original game, she was Anna's best friend at school, only for that role to be taken by Grace. She instead becomes the theatrical advisor as well as Anna and Grace's helper.
Grenat (ガーネット, Gānetto)
Voiced by: Yuna Kamakura (Japanese); Monica Rial (English)
A half-elf and a magic professor at school.
Headmaster (学園長, Gakuenchō)
Voiced by: Hōchū Ōtsuka (Japanese); John Swasey (English)
A powerful wizard and headmaster of the school.
Tsuchii
Voiced by: (Japanese); Andrew Love (English)
One of the students.
Orion (オリオン)
Voiced by: (Japanese); Brittney Karbowski (English)
Grace's dragon familiar, whom Kenzaburo created with Hinako's help.
Pollux (ポルックス, Porukkusu)
Pierre's gargoyle familiar.
Spica (スピカ, Supika)
Voiced by: (Japanese); Annie Wild (English)
Virgile's Griffin familiar.
Sirius (シリウス, Shiriusu)
Voiced by: (Japanese); Carolyn Medrano (English)
Anna's Pegasus familiar.
Regulus (レグルス, Regurusu)
Voiced by: (Japanese); Elissa Cuellar (English)
Auguste's Garuda familiar.
Sadalmelik (サダルメリク, Sadarumeriku)
Richard's sea serpent familiar.
Zubenelgenubu
Lambert's sphinx familiar.
Violet Corbeau (ヴィオレ・コルポー, Viore Korupō), Jaune Moineau (ジョーヌ・モワノー, Jōnu Mowanō), and Marron Chouette (マロン・シュエット, Maron Shuetto)
Voiced by: (Japanese); Ellen Evans (English)
Voiced by: (Japanese); Alyssa Marek (English)
Voiced by: (Japanese); Elissa Cuellar (English)
Three girls who are at first antagonistic towards Grace and Anna, but are convinced to get along with them instead.
Mathilde
A cat girl maid who works for Grace. She can wield fire magic.
Olive
The head maid of Grace's family.
Walz
Voiced by: (Japanese); Joe Daniels (English)
A dwarf craftsman employed by the Duke's family. He is in charge of the workshop within the mansion.
Jacqueline
Grace's mother, who can foresee the future. She is usually away from home and works with a strange talking orb of light.

== Media ==
=== Manga ===
Written and illustrated by Michiro Ueyama, From Bureaucrat to Villainess: Dad's Been Reincarnated! started in Shōnen Gahōsha's seinen manga magazine Young King Ours GH on March 16, 2020. The magazine ceased publication on November 17, 2025, and the series resumed on the publisher's Comic Y-OURs website on January 13, 2026. Shōnen Gahōsha has collected its chapters into individual tankōbon volumes. The first volume was released on December 16, 2020. As of November 9, 2026, eleven volumes have been released.

==== Volumes ====
No.	Japanese release date	Japanese ISBN
1	December 16, 2020	978-4-7859-6827-4
2	August 2, 2021	978-4-7859-6968-4
3	April 5, 2022	978-4-7859-7114-4
4	December 28, 2022	978-4-7859-7308-7
5	June 5, 2023	978-4-7859-7406-0
6	January 4, 2024	978-4-7859-7578-4
7	August 5, 2024	978-4-7859-7726-9
8	March 10, 2025	978-4-7859-7901-0
9	October 10, 2025	978-4-7859-8045-0
10	May 8, 2026	978-4-7859-8192-1
11	November 9, 2026	978-4-7859-8318-5

=== Anime ===
In January 2024, it was announced that the manga would receive an anime television series adaptation. It was animated by Ajiado and directed by Tetsuya Takeuchi, with series composition by Shingo Irie, character designs by Haruka Matsunae and monster designs by Yuki Miyamoto. The music is composed by Natsumi Tabuchi, Misaki Tsuchida, Tsugumi Tanaka, Reiko Abe, and Kaho Sawada. The series aired from January 10 to March 28, 2025, on the Super Animeism Turbo programming block on all JNN affiliates, including MBS and TBS. (Note: MBS listed the premiere date on January 9 at 24:26, which is effectively January 10 at 12:26 JST.) The opening theme song is "Choose!!!", performed by Cider Girl, while the ending theme song is "Matsuken Samba II" (マツケンサンバII), performed by Kazuhiko Inoue and M.A.O as their respective characters.

Sentai Filmworks licensed the series in North America for streaming on Hidive. In South and Southeast Asia, the series has been licensed by Muse Communication.

==== Episodes ====
No.	Title	Directed by (Note: Production staff information is taken from the ending credits of each episode.)	Written by	Storyboarded by	Original release date
1	"Dad Becomes a Villainess"; Transliteration: "Oji-san, Akuyaku Reijō ni Naru" (Japanese: おじさん、悪役令嬢になる)	Tetsuya Takeuchi	Shingo Irie	Tetsuya Takeuchi	January 10, 2025
Kenzaburo Tondabayashi, a 52-year old bureaucrat, gets hit by a truck and awakens as Grace Auvergne, the villainess in his daughter Hinako's favorite otome game, Magical Academy: Love & Beast. As Kenzaburo's politeness clashes with Grace's cruelty, the characters he interacts with become confused. Using his knowledge about the game from watching Hinako play, Kenzaburo tries to role-play as a villain to the game's protagonist, Anna Doll, but cannot break away from his polite etiquette and instead, Grace becomes friends with Anna on the way to the entrance ceremony at Royal Magic Academy. Virgile Vierge, the crown prince and one of Anna's love interests, approaches the two and becomes friends with Anna. After the ceremony, Anna sits next to Grace in class and encourages her to work hard. Meanwhile, Virgile and head of student council security Auguste Lion discuss who they want on the student council and Virgile puts a recommendation for Grace and Anna. At lunchtime, students are tasked with serving themselves, which several students are unwilling to do having been served by their servants, but after seeing Grace carry the food in an elegant manner and complementing the chefs at the end, the other students follow Grace's lead.
2	"Dad Becomes a Sorcerer"; Transliteration: "Oji-san, Mahōtsukai ni Naru" (Japanese: おじさん、魔法使いになる)	Hidekazu Oka	Shingo Irie	Tetsuya Takeuchi	January 17, 2025
Grace and Anna are introduced to the boys of the student council, who are Anna's love interests in the game, and the council is surprised to hear that Grace is endorsing Anna as they were expecting Grace to act with hostility since Kenzaburo is too kind and polite to act like this. Grace agrees to help Anna with her etiquette as they both join the student council. Afterwards, the students take practical lessons in sorcery with Grace and Anna standing out. Tsuchii, one of the students, grows jealous of them and summons a giant golem that goes berserk, but Grace casts a spell to stop it and Tsuchii is sent to the magic teacher's office for his foolish actions. Meanwhile, Grace's clumsy maid-in-training Josette recalls the time when Grace's behavior suddenly changed. One day after hearing rumors circulating about incompetent maids being pawned off, Josette accidentally breaks a teapot while attempting to serve tea to Grace and fears that she will be punished, but instead Grace assured her that she will never pawn her off understanding that mistakes happen and offered her sweets. Afterwards, Grace and Josette visit a blacksmith to get the teapot fixed while asking him to make an abacus.
3	"Dad Makes a Pun!"; Transliteration: "Oji-san, Dajare o Iu!" (Japanese: おじさん、ダジャレを言う！)	Yūki Morita	Shingo Irie	Shinpei Matsuo	January 24, 2025
Using the abacus, Grace makes quick work of the accounting assignment given by the student council, while also helping Anna with her task as Kenzaburo continues to forget that he is supposed to be a villainess. Afterwards, Auguste and vice president Richard Verseau have a duel to determine who the strongest man in the student council is, which ends in a draw. After the duel, a Miyama stag beetle lands on Auguste's back. Unwilling to kill it, Grace grabs the beetle and uses magic to return it to the forest. Richard then brings Grace, Anna, and Virgile to the academy's secret vault where various weaponry and armor are stored and maintained. Richard makes various puns about the items there, which Grace does not find amusing, and Grace responds with her own puns that Richard admits are better than his. The next day, Anna feels depressed after the treasurer Lambert Balance brags about finishing his work before Anna does getting her to think that Lambert hates her. Virgile's younger brother Lucas Vierge clears the air and tells Anna that he sees this as a rivalry. The next day, Anna finishes her work before Lambert does, while Grace tells Lambert that student council work is not a competition and gives him his own abacus. She also gives another one to Lucas, who treats it like a toy. Kenzaburo then decides that even though he has become the villainess that he will continue to help others like he had been doing in his previous life.
4	"Dad Summons a Beast"; Transliteration: "Oji-san, Bīsuto o Shōkan Suru" (Japanese: おじさん、ビーストを召喚する)	Yūsuke Onoda	Hiroyuki Kishikura	Tetsuya Takeuchi	January 31, 2025
One month since the start of the school year, the students summon their beasts having incubated their beast eggs as their real magic lessons do not begin until they obtain their beasts. Anna summons a Pegasus with the wind attribute, while Auguste summons a Garuda with the fire attribute, and Virgile summons a Griffin with wind. Grace summons a rare Ancient Dragon with both fire and water attributes much to everybody's surprise since it is unheard of for a beast to have more than one attribute. Back in Japan, Hinako and her mother Mitsuko visit Kenzaburo in the hospital and is informed that while he is still alive, he has not awakened. After returning home from the hospital, Hinako notices that her game and TV are on and cannot be switched off after discovering that the TV's remote and game controller are not working, and sees that her father's mind is inside the game's universe as Grace. She tells this to Mitsuko, who surprisingly believes her as they check the game's stats to confirm that Kenzaburo is indeed Grace. Hinako is able to watch the events unfold from Grace's perspective and intervene at the major events in the game as she helped summoned Grace's beast by combining the mana forms of Kenzaburo and Grace to create the dual-attribute dragon, also discovering that she can reach into the TV screen as if it were a portal. She and Mitsuko decide to continue the game in hopes of bringing Kenzaburo back to the real world.
5	"Dad Gets Into Dual-wielding"; Transliteration: "Oji-san, Nitōryū de Iku" (Japanese: おじさん、二刀流でいく)	Takahiro Okao	Shingo Irie	Takeshi Mori	February 7, 2025
After naming the dragon Orion, Grace begins magic lessons finding out that while Orion's magic is powerful. Orion cannot use both fire and water magic simultaneously. Grace reveals that a second soul and merged with her own, making the others understand why she has changed, although she does not reveal her true identity, to Hinako's relief. The principal recommends Grace to take part in the upcoming Magic Exhibition and Grace hesitantly accepts. It is revealed that Hinako named the dragon Orion, and in order for it to use the other attribute, she has to switch it; in fact, controlling Orion is the only thing she can do. She must also help Kenzaburo to make him proceed in the game's plot. Afterwards, Grace heads to the library to research magic and beasts and as they enter, Francette Mercure, who is doing research for the drama club's next performance, secretly observes Grace and Anna and collapses after being moved by their friendship. Grace meets Pierre Gemeaux, the student council secretary and Virgile's dedicated personal attendant, who expresses his concern about Virgile ignoring him for so long. Instead of scolding him as Grace in the game does, Grace spins this as Virgile not wanting to overwork him to the point where his performance suffers from fatigue. Grace asks Pierre to show them his beast, a Gargoyle with the water attribute named Pollux. When Pierre asks about the marriage with Virgile, Grace tells Pierre that the marriage is not guaranteed until it happens, prompting Virgile, who had overheard their conversation, to appear and offer to train Anna in wind magic. Kenzaburo sees this as an opportunity to play the villainess and asks Anna to be Grace's assistant once she has finished her training, which to his surprise, Anna enthusiastically accepts with Virgile's blessing.
6	"Dad is Moved to Tears"; Transliteration: "Oji-san, Kanrui Suru" (Japanese: おじさん、感涙する)	Akira Katō	Aoi Uno	Shinpei Matsuo	February 14, 2025
Grace, Anna, Richard, and Auguste train for the Magic Exhibition. During their training, a Dragon Skeleton monster emerges and attacks the four. Richard and August engage in combat while Grace and Anna are instructed to go get backup, but Grace uses their magic circles and her "magic fand" (combination of a magic wand and hand fan) to convert their beasts into weapons to defeat the monster. Back at the academy, after placing a barrier around the school to keep magic inside, Grace and Anna train together with Anna making great progress in her training. Afterwards, Hinako sees the screen turn 8-bit as three girls, Violet Corbeau, Jaune Moineau, and Marron Chouette, appear in front of Grace to spread bad rumors about Anna, but Grace tells them to be careful about what they say. The student council convenes, and the boys talk about how exceptional Grace and Anna are for participating in the Magic Exhibition in their first year, which is unheard of. Lucas warns Grace that while the student council accepts Anna as Grace's partner despite being a commoner, others do not hold the same opinion. Violet, Jaune, and Marron bully Anna to get her to give up her role as Grace's assistant, but responds by expressing her unwavering devotion to Grace. With both Kenzaburo and Hinako moved by Anna's words, Grace comes out to apologize to the three and encourages them to all get along despite their differences in social standing.
7	"Dad Puts On a Exhibition"; Transliteration: "Oji-san, Mohan Enshū Suru" (Japanese: おじさん、模範演習する)	Hidekazu Oka	Hiroyuki Kishikura	Tetsuya Takeuchi	February 21, 2025
Grace's father Leopold Auvergne arrives home to visit his daughter, having been worried about her after learning that she fell off her horse. He then gifts her with a wooden rocking horse, which the real Grace loved in her childhood. Though Kenzaburo knows that Grace will throw an outburst for being too old for it, he instead makes her feel grateful for the gift that she plans to give to her cousin Francois. Auvergne and the servants are all amazed by how much Grace has changed. Grace and Josette go to visit the same blacksmith from before and find him playing tops with Auvergne, where Kenzaburo learns more about Grace and her family's past. Grace also decides to join in on the fun and wins since Kenzaburo is skilled with tops. The next day, the magical exams begin, and Kenzaburo's family begin to see that his personality is changing. As Grace and Anna take part in the tournament, Auvergne sees the improvement in his daughter. Grace and Anna summon their familiars to hit the moving targets, but the magic teacher merges them into a single beast-like target for their next challenge. Unable to hurt it with fire, Grace has Orion switch to using water attributes with Hinako's help, and she and Anna manage to destroy the target. Auvergne is impressed by the display, and Anna reveals that she has gained weight. She explains that she earlier tried to go on a diet by eating less meat, but changed her mind and instead decided to exercise to lose weight.
8	"Dad Becomes a Maid"; Transliteration: "Oji-san, Meido ni Naru" (Japanese: おじさん、メイドになる)	Takahide Ogata	Shingo Irie	Takahide Ogata	February 28, 2025
One week after the magic exhibition, Anna, Lucas, and Lambert come over to the Auvergne Estate as Lambert tries out his new wand book that was custom made for him by Meister Walz. While sitting together for sweets, Kenzaburo thinks about the ideal route for Anna, believing that Lambert is best suited for her due to him being from a fringe noble family. With summer vacation coming up, Grace convinces Anna to spend it at the Auvergne Estate as a way to better understand high class society. That night, Grace has a dream where Kenzaburo finds Grace locked in a cage tries to free her from it. The next day, Grace wakes up being greeted by Josette and Anna, who decides to work as a maid for Grace's family. Hinako notices that the scenario unfolding is one not a possible route from the original game as either she stays in the dorms or goes home for the summer. Anna meets Mathilde, Grace's hairdresser, who can only use basic fire magic, and she explains how her skills served everybody in the estate well. Afterwards, Anna meets the head maid Olive, who explains the Augverne family and the activities that go on around the estate, mentioning that there are around 300 servants working at the estate. At the end of the day, Grace shows up dressed up as a maid, and asks Anna about her impression about the estate. Anna answers by explaining that the estate is a place of learning and that while it appears to be just a lavish place to commoners, it is also a place with a great sense of community. Grace compliments her answer and believes that she will become a noble someday.
9	"Dad Gets Trapped"; Transliteration: "Oji-san, Toji Komera reru" (Japanese: おじさん、閉じ込められる)	Kōji Komurakata	Hiroyuki Kishikura	Kei Oikawa	March 7, 2025
As Grace and Anna enter the secret vault to meet up with the student council, the boys vanish after Lucas solves a Rubik's Cube puzzle. Soon after, Grace and Anna exit the room and find themselves in the Labyrinth of Trials where the two must solve a series of riddles with one of the boys. The first riddle with Virgil has Grace using Orion's fire and water magic to create a bath in a small tank. Afterwards, Virgil returns to the cube and Lambert comes out for the next trial centered around the Riddle of the Sphinx with each person simultaneously standing on the designated number of legs and shouting the answer, which relates to a human's lifetime. As Grace and Anna move in for the third trial, Hinako explains that this event is a bonus game designed to boost intimacy with random characters that most players skip due to the difficulty of solving the cube. For the next trial, Pierre is tasked with making an ice barrier around a ring to light a torch using the sun like a magnifying glass, but is too afraid of heights. Instead, Orion uses water magic to create the barrier to clear the trial. Richard and Auguste come out for the next trial, based on the fable The North Wind and the Sun with Lucas being the traveler. Richard brings out a taiko drum, but being terrible at singing, Grace plays instead. Grace uses Kenzaburo's experience with rhythm games and karaoke to sing the ending theme of Galaxy Express 999 to get Lucas to come out and pass the trial. Afterwards, Orion (controlled by Hinako) grabs the cube and takes it apart for Grace and Anna to reconstruct piece-by-piece like what Kenzaburo once taught Hinako, but the cube reverts to its previous state; it will not allow cheating. However, Anna solves the puzzle to bring everybody back to the secret vault.
10	"Dad Cross-dresses"; Transliteration: "Oji-san, Dansō Suru" (Japanese: おじさん、男装する)	Hidekazu Oka	Aoi Uno	Tomoko Iwazaki	March 14, 2025
Grace and Josette visit Anna's home, whose family runs a bakery. They are greeted by Anna's mother, who quickly figures out Grace's identity. Grace meets up with Anna while helping a boy get down from a tree combining Anna's wind with Grace's water magic to create an ice slide, and afterwards Anna reveals Grace's identity to the townspeople, much to her embarrassment. Sometime later back at the academy, Grace is in charge of organizing the academy festival and has Anna decide the activity for being the first-year valedictorian, and Anna decides to put on a play involving a prince and a commoner who became friends and then swapped places through a magic spell. Hinako and Mitsuko watch these events and recall how Grace previously acted in the original story. Lucas mentions a restriction that is traditional at the academy. That night, Grace talks about the festival with Leopold, and he mentions that he used to serve the student council with his wife Jacqueline Auvergne serving as the president, and that Jacqueline is the one who started the tradition with the restriction for the play being cross-gender casting. Hinako mentions that the origins of the cross-gender casting idea are different and cannot hold back their excitement as fangirls; however, they also worry about the outcome. The next day, Grace and Anna discuss casting with Anna accepting her lead role as the prince.
11	"Dad Gets into an Elegant Pickle"; Transliteration: "Oji-san, Ereganto na Dai-pinchi!" (Japanese: おじさん、エレガントな大ピンチ！)	Takahide Ogata	Shingo Irie	Takahide Ogata	March 21, 2025
After spending the whole day at the library to do research to write the play's script, Anna collapses and Grace brings her to the nurse's office to rest. Anna considers herself a failure, but Grace assures her otherwise. Afterwards, Grace and Anna look for somebody with theatrical expertise and are introduced to Francette (or Fran for short). The three look at scripts that were written in the past and they stumble across one that stands out written by Jacqueline. Hinako explains that in the game's original script, Fran serves as Anna's best friend, but that role was taken by Grace and Fran is instead the theatrical advisor. With two weeks left before the festival, Grace provides an overview of the script and the cast with Grace cast as the prince Edmond, Anna as the commoner Toby, Richard as Toby's mother, Virgile as the queen, Pierre as a maid, Lucas as the fairy Fee, Auguste as the knight Marielle, and Lambert as the queen's sister Simone. Before that, Grace practices playing as Edmond, but struggles with her lines after the body swap due to it clashing with her Elegant Cheat skill, prompting Grace to ask Fran to revise the script to have Anna stand out more. After reading Jacqueline's script, Fran realizes how much of an amateur she is. That night, Leopold informs Grace that Jacqueline plans to attend the play. With the festival approaching, the student council boys tell Grace that they have other commitments in the lead-up to the festival that will make doing a group rehearsal impossible.
12	"Dad Celebrates at the Campus Festival"; Transliteration: "Oji-san, Gakuen-sai de Uchiageru" (Japanese: おじさん、学園祭で打ち上げる)	Hidekazu Oka	Shingo Irie	Kei Oikawa	March 28, 2025
The festival begins with Grace and Anna meeting Anna's mother, then Leopold arriving to destroy a golem a member of the Earth Magic Enthusiast Club was illegally using outside the club's designated area. Afterwards, Grace and Anna head off to the student council room to prepare for the play. Shortly afterwards, the play of The Prince and the Peasant begins with Jacqueline in attendance. During the scene after Edmond and Toby switch bodies, Grace struggles with her lines due to Elegant Cheat that nearly ruins the play, but Lucas bails her out with an ad-lib, having been informed of Grace's predicament by Jacqueline, who can see into the future. The play continues without any problems to the end and is a great success. After the play, Grace meets up with Leopold, who tells her that Jacqueline had another matter to attend to and leaves Grace with a letter instead, while Jacqueline gets emotional, expressing this to a mysterious orb of light as she leaves. Hinako and Mitsuko are disappointed by this while Hinako reveals what happens next. That night, Anna and the student council go searching for Grace to watch the fireworks show together, but they are unable to find her. The fireworks show begins and after seeing dual-colored fireworks that only Grace is capable of producing, everybody realizes that Grace is helping out with the show. Kenzaburo then declares that his life as the villainess has only begun.

== Reception ==
In 2020, the manga was nominated for the sixth Next Manga Awards in the print category and placed fourth out of the 50 nominees with 17,633 votes. By October 2025, it had over 2.5 million copies in circulation.

At the 10th Crunchyroll Anime Awards in 2026, the anime was nominated for Best Isekai Anime.
