= Mushoku Tensei season 3 =

Mushoku Tensei III: Jobless Reincarnation
- Season 3
- Cover of the first Blu-ray featuring Rudeus Greyrat
- No. of episodes: 14

Release
- Original network: Tokyo MX, BS11, KBS, SUN
- Original release: July 4, 2026 – present

Season chronology
- ← Previous; Season 2

The third season of the anime television series Mushoku Tensei: Jobless Reincarnation, also marketed as Mushoku Tensei III: Jobless Reincarnation, is based on Rifujin na Magonote's light novel series of the same title. The series follows a jobless and hopeless man who dies after having a sad and reclusive life and reincarnates in a fantasy world while keeping his memories, determined to enjoy his second chance at life without regrets as Rudeus Greyrat.

A third season was announced following the airing of the second season's final episode. Ryōsuke Shibuya directed the season and handled the series composition with Naoto Taniuchi, and Sanae Shimada and Ryōta Furukawa designed the characters. The first cour premiered with its first two episodes on July 4, 2026, and ended on September 28. The second cour is set to premiere in 2027.

The opening theme song is "Ketsui no Uta" (決意の唄; lit. 'Song of Resolve'), performed by Yuiko Ōhara, while the ending theme song is "Inori, Owareba" (祈り、終われば; lit. 'If the Prayers Are Over'), performed by Mika Nakashima.

== Episodes ==
| No. overall | No. in season | Title | Directed by (Note: Production staff information is taken from the ending credits of each episode.) | Written by | Chief animation directed by | Original release date |
|---|---|---|---|---|---|---|
Part 1
| 49 | 1 | "Burn Bright, Mad Dog"; Transliteration: "Moeyo Kyōken" (Japanese: 燃えよ狂犬) | Directed by : Shōgo Katō; Storyboarded by : Ryōsuke Shibuya | Atsushi Takayama | Keiya Nakano & Satoshi Shimada | July 4, 2026 |
After leaving Rudeus, Eris travels with Ghislaine to the Sword Sanctum to meet the latter's sword master, Sword God Gal Farion. Intrigued by Eris' desire to kill Orsted, Farion has her duel two of his students, whom she easily defeats. Farion then duels her and, impressed at seeing her survive his opening attack, promotes her to the rank of Sword Saint and accepts her as his personal student. Over the next several years, Eris trains endlessly to try and master the Sword God style, to the point where Farion and her fellow students nickname her "Mad Dog". One night, she encounters a traveling swordsman, North Emperor Auber Corbett, and starts a duel with him before being interrupted by Farion. Despite this, Auber is impressed with Eris' skill. The next day, Ghislaine confronts Farion about his hands-off training style and demands to know why he hasn't taught Eris the Blade of Light technique yet. Farion admits that nothing he can teach Eris will help her defeat Orsted, since he has mastered every sword style in existence. To that end, Farion invites other sword masters, such as Auber, to train Eris in their respective styles. That morning, Eris and Auber have a proper duel with each other. Remembering she wants to get stronger not just to defeat Orsted, but also to protect Rudeus, Eris manages to perform the Blade of Light on her own, impressing everybody. Auber then challenges her to a rematch, which she gladly accepts.
| 50 | 2 | "Howl, Mad Dog"; Transliteration: "Hoeyo Kyōken" (Japanese: 吠えよ狂犬) | Directed by : Akari Ranzaki; Storyboarded by : Akari Ranzaki & Ryōsuke Shibuya | Atsushi Takayama & Rifujin na Magonote | Kazuhiro Ōta (Note: This episode contains no chief animation director credit, making those credited under "animation director" chief by default.) | July 4, 2026 |
Nina, Farion's daughter and student, quickly grows jealous of Eris' skill. Annoyed at Eris' reverence for Rudeus, Nina travels to the Ranoa University of Magic to confront him and see if he is really as powerful as Eris claims. She arrives at the same time various beastman students are challenging Rudeus for the right to marry Linia and Pursena. When Badigadi arrives and goads the other beastmen into fighting him, Nina joins in as well and is easily defeated. When she awakens, she witnesses Rudeus wound Badigadi, and she comes to understand who Eris is trying to catch up to. Inspired by Eris' resolve, Nina decides to start training alongside her. Later, the Water God Reida Lia arrives at Farion's invitation. Reida agrees to train Eris and Nina on the condition they defeat her apprentice, Water King Isolde Cluel. Isolde defeats Eris, but Nina knocks her out with superior speed. Eris, Nina, and Isolde train together, but are unable to decisively decide who is best among them. Isolde points out that Eris' style of goading opponents into moving the way she wants isn't compatible with the Water style, which relies on detecting aggression and counterattacking, and advises her to find a way to control her aggression. Upon observing Eris whenever she talks about Rudeus, Nina advises her to use her thoughts about him to calm herself so she can slip past Isolde's defenses. Taking Nina's advice into account, Eris finally defeats Isolde in a duel, while their masters watch and are impressed by all three students' rapid improvement.
| 51 | 3 | "Life Back at Home"; Transliteration: "Kaettekita Nichijō" (Japanese: 帰ってきた日常) | Directed by : Ryō Ishimaru; Storyboarded by : Yasuhiko Akiyama | Kōhei Urushibara | Satoshi Shimada | July 13, 2026 |
Back in Sharia, Rudeus lives an idyllic life with his family as he starts reattending classes with Sylphie while Roxy joins the university as an instructor. He is pleased to see that Norn has adjusted better to school life, and he also helps take care of Zenith and write Ruijerd's story. Rudeus also reunites with his classmates but is surprised to learn that Roxy has been assigned as their homeroom teacher. This causes friction with Cliff, as he follows Millis, who does not support polygamy. Still, he is willing to overlook things as long as Rudeus takes better care of Norn. Zanoba and Cliff then gift Rudeus a prototype enchanted glove they developed that can act as a prosthetic for his missing left hand, which was based on research on the automated puppet. With some testing, Rudeus also discovers to his delight that he can still cast magic with the glove as well. With Zanoba and Cliff's blessings, Rudeus christens the glove the "Hand of Zaliff". Returning home, Rudeus is thankful for this peaceful life he has been able to experience, and prays to Roxy's panties in a shrine he has erected in his mansion's secret chamber.
| 52 | 4 | "A King-Class Water Mage"; Transliteration: "Mizuōkyū Majutsushi" (Japanese: 水王級魔術師) | Hiroki Nagashima | Naoto Taniuchi | Ikuma Fujibe | July 20, 2026 |
Geese and Talhand decide to leave to continue adventuring, and give Rudeus his and Paul's share of the loot from the Teleporter Labyrinth. Upon returning home, he discovers Aisha has been secretly raising a treant and instructs her to destroy it, since it's a potentially dangerous monster. Aisha threatens to tell Roxy and Sylphie about the secret shrine when Roxy arrives and confirms treants can be tamed, so Aisha adopts it and names it Byt. After doing some research with Cliff and Zanoba and inviting them to dinner, Rudeus realizes that he needs to become stronger if he wants to protect his family in the future. With that in mind, he asks Roxy to teach him and Sylphie King-class water magic. While reluctant at first, Roxy eventually agrees and shows them her most powerful spell, Lightning. Rudeus is able to copy the spell on his first try, while Sylphie is unable to cast it yet. On the way home, the three reminisce about their time in Buena Village, which only hardens Rudeus' resolve to protect his family.
| 53 | 5 | "Celebrations"; Transliteration: "Oiwai" (Japanese: お祝い) | Directed by : Yuki Tateno; Storyboarded by : Tomohiko Itō | Kōhei Urushibara | Haruka Katsutani & Shunryō Yamamura | July 27, 2026 |
Shortly before Cliff and Elinalise's wedding, the latter convinces Rudeus to help procure a special Asuran aphrodisiac for her in return for convincing Sylphie and Roxy to have a threesome with him. After attending the wedding ceremony, Rudeus realizes that due to the Teleportation Disaster, nobody had a chance to celebrate Norn and Aisha's fifth and tenth birthdays properly, so he decides to hold a surprise birthday party for them. The next day, Rudeus, Sylphie, and Roxy head to town to do some shopping for the party, and thanks to Elinalise's arrangements, they all agree to stay at an inn for the night to conduct the threesome. The next day, Rudeus invites Norn and Aisha out for fishing as a pretext to get them out of the house so the party preparations can be made, as well as try to get Norn to accept Roxy as a member of the family. The fishing trip ends up being a success, and Rudeus also shows off a new spell he developed, a powered-down variation of Lightning he dubs Electric. The party goes off without a hitch, and Norn and Aisha receive their presents while Zenith shows signs of recovery. Rudeus and Sylphie then gift Roxy a new hat as a wedding present, and Rudeus makes plans to throw another party when Norn and Aisha turn fifteen.
| 54 | 6 | "Another Domestic Disaster?"; Transliteration: "Shuraba Futatabi?" (Japanese: 修羅場再び？) | Directed by : Keito Hoshi; Storyboarded by : Mie Ōishi | Naoto Taniuchi | Keiya Nakano | August 3, 2026 |
By chance, Rudeus had reunited with Suzanne, who retired to Sharia after Counter Arrow disbanded and has been hired as Lucy's wet nurse. Roxy then recruits Rudeus to help guard Ranoa's princess along with Ariel and Sylphie during an important pilgrimage, but he is surprised to discover Sara was also hired for the job as part of the all-female adventurer group Amazon Ace. Unsure of how to deal with Sara, Rudeus does his best to avoid her during the quest. Sensing the tension, Ariel and Sylphie arrange for Rudeus and Sara to run an errand together as a pretext for them to speak privately. While away from the party, Rudeus apologizes for not reciprocating Sara's feelings, admitting that he was desperate to put Eris' abandonment behind him and didn't hold any actual romantic feelings for her. Sara also apologizes since she was not aware of Rudeus' erectile dysfunction at the time, and appreciates him being more honest with her now. Having aired their feelings out, they both reconcile with each other and decide to remain fellow adventurers. After the quest is resolved, Rudeus admits to Sylphie and Roxy that he holds special feelings for girls who have saved him at his lowest points, and hints he may marry Eris in the future. Meanwhile, Farion grants Eris the title of Sword King after she defeats Nina in a duel.
| 55 | 7 | "Phase Four"; Transliteration: "Dai Yon Dankai" (Japanese: 第四段階) | Directed by : Shōgo Katō; Storyboarded by : Yuri Pinzon | Atsushi Takayama | Ikuma Fujibe | August 10, 2026 |
Linia and Pursena graduate from the university and ask Rudeus to witness a duel between them. Since none of their suitors were strong enough to defeat them, they have decided to use the duel to determine who will become the next chief of the Dedoldia tribe, with the loser going off to live a life free of the tribe's expectations. After a brutal physical fight, Pursena comes out the victor. However, despite them both swearing never to see each other again, they end up taking the same stagecoach out of town and begin bickering again. Rudeus then begins assisting Nanahoshi with "phase three" of her summoning experiments, despite worries about her declining health in the past year. Nanahoshi successfully summons a watermelon from the other world, and everybody celebrates her achieving a new milestone in her research. During the party, Norn announces her intention to join the Student Council, and Rudeus supports her. Nanahoshi thanks Rudeus for his help and offers to introduce him and his friends to her mentor, who may be able to help her reach "phase four" and restore Zenith's memories, revealing that he is the famous hero Perugius, the Armored Dragon King.
| 56 | 8 | "The Flying Fortress"; Transliteration: "Kūchū Jōsai" (Japanese: 空中城塞) | Directed by : Ryō Ishimaru; Storyboarded by : Shōgo Kōmoto & Ryōsuke Shibuya | Kōhei Urushibara | Shunryō Yamamura | August 17, 2026 |
Nanahoshi guides Rudeus and his friends to a location where they can teleport to Perugius' flying fortress Chaos Breaker, but Roxy is forced to stay behind due to Perugius' distrust of demons. One of Perugius' servants, Sylvaril, asks Rudeus and Sylphie if they are familiar with the Man-God, but Rudeus feigns ignorance due to his previous experience with Orsted. During their audience with Perugius, he reveals many things. He doesn't know of a cure for Zenith's condition, but he knows that people who have served as "hearts" for dungeons lose their memories and gain mysterious powers, revealing that Elinalise is a similar individual who was rescued from a dungeon. He informs Zanoba that the late Mad Dragon King Kaos developed the autonomous puppet. He tells Sylphie that, to his knowledge, nobody can create the Teleportation Disaster, so it must have been a random occurrence. Afterward, Elinalise admits she received her curse from the dungeon; in return, her body periodically produces mana crystals, but her memory never returned. Later, Nanahoshi approaches Rudeus and Sylphie for a detox spell, as her condition continues to worsen. Sylphie attempts to cast the spell, but it somehow backfires and causes Nanahoshi to vomit blood before passing out.
| 57 | 9 | "Lament"; Transliteration: "Dōkoku" (Japanese: 慟哭) | Directed by : Satoru Yamashita; Storyboarded by : Shinji Itadaki | Naoto Taniuchi | Satoshi Shimada | August 24, 2026 |
After an examination, Sylvaril determines that Nanahoshi is suffering from Dryne Syndrome, a rare illness where people with low mana tolerance are exposed to too much mana. Perugius decides that he will do the minimum necessary to keep Nanahoshi alive, but he won't devote his resources to finding a cure, since he needs to remain prepared for the eventual return of the Demon God Laplace. After witnessing Nanahoshi suffering another nervous breakdown over not wanting to die in the fantasy world without having a chance to return home, Rudeus is determined to find a cure to her condition. He convinces Perugius to teleport him to the Demon Continent, and he leads a party consisting of himself, Elinalise, Zanoba, and Cliff to find Kishirika, who may know more about Dryne Syndrome. After teleporting, Rudeus finds himself back in Rikarisu, but their efforts to find Kishirika prove difficult, and Rudeus only learns she is apparently trying to find Badigadi's older sister, King Atofe. While buying food, Cliff decides to feed a hungry beggar, who happens to be Kishirika. In thanks, she promises to grant Cliff one wish.
| 58 | 10 | "An Audience with an Immortal Demon King"; Transliteration: "Fushi Maō to no Ekken" (Japanese: 不死魔王との謁見) | Directed by : Hiroki Nagashima; Storyboarded by : Hiroki Nagashima, Yasuhiko Akiyama & Ryōsuke Shibuya | Atsushi Takayama | Ikuma Fujibe | August 31, 2026 |
Cliff asks Kishirika for a cure to Dryne Syndrome, and she explains that sokas grass, native to the Demon Continent, was used to treat it. Atofe's soldiers then confront them and offer to trade sokas grass in return for turning Kishirika over. Upon learning Kishirika stole all of Atofe's alcohol, Rudeus gladly agrees to the trade. They are then granted an audience with Atofe, but the captain of her guard, Moore, warns them not to accept any reward from her. Atofe arrives, thanks Rudeus for apprehending Kishirika, and offers him a place in her royal guard. Rudeus turns down the offer, causing her to attack him in anger. Zanoba manages to distract Atofe long enough for Rudeus to blast her away, and Moore advises them to flee before she forces them to serve her for life. The party heads back to the teleportation circle only to find Atofe already waiting for them. A fierce battle breaks out between the two groups until Perugius intervenes. He uses his magic to cut Atofe in half and send her body flying away, and her guards retreat to retrieve her. Despite this, Perugius insists Atofe will survive. Kishirika escapes, and Rudeus is glad they will be able to cure Nanahoshi.
| 59 | 11 | "Turning Point 4"; Transliteration: "Tāningu Pointo Yon" (Japanese: ターニングポイント4) | Directed by : Keito Hoshi; Storyboarded by : Keiichiro Kawaguchi | Kōhei Urushibara | Satoshi Shimada | September 7, 2026 |
Rudeus and his friends recover at Perugius' fortress, and it is revealed that Cliff received the Mystic Eye of Discernment, which shows him information on everything he sees. Nanahoshi also recovers thanks to the sokas grass, but it only treats her condition, as it is not a full cure. Rudeus promises to help her get home. Perugius is impressed that Rudeus held his own against Atofe and gave him a chance to get some revenge on her, and he gifts him a whistle that can summon him. Rudeus and Zanoba also convince Perugius to allow figurines of Ruijerd to be distributed, as he owes Ruijerd a debt for saving his life during the final battle against Laplace. Ariel tries to curry favor with Perugius, but he tells her he will only give her his backing if she can tell him the most important quality of a king. Back home, Rudeus starts a diary to track his thoughts. That night, the Man-God approaches Rudeus again, claiming that if he had not joined Paul's party to rescue Zenith, Paul would have succeeded and lived. Rudeus is shocked, but takes responsibility for his decision. The Man-God then instructs Rudeus to inspect his basement. However, before he can enter the basement, he meets a mysterious old man claiming to be his future self, who warns him not to trust the Man-God.
| 60 | 12 | "An End and a Beginning"; Transliteration: "Owari to Hajimari" (Japanese: 終わりと始まり) | Directed by : Shōgo Katō; Storyboarded by : Tomohiko Itō & Ryōsuke Shibuya | Naoto Taniuchi | Keiya Nakano | September 14, 2026 |
The old man reveals he is Rudeus fifty years in the future, and warns him that opening the basement door will cause a chain of events that leads to Roxy being afflicted with Petrification Sickness, which will kill her before Rudeus can find a cure. Afterward, Sylphie is killed during Ariel's failed attempt to seize Asura's throne. Eris will eventually die shielding Rudeus from an attack. Many of Rudeus' friends will also end up dying, leaving him completely alone. He further warns that the Man-God, who used to be called the "Human God", admitted that he arranged for their deaths and tricked Rudeus to further his own agenda. The old man then instructs Rudeus that he must do three things: ask Nanahoshi for advice, reconcile with Eris, and doubt the Man-God while not antagonizing him. The old man then leaves behind his diary and admits he is dying, having sacrificed most of his organs in exchange for traveling back in time. He uses his mystic eye to see Roxy and Sylphie one last time before passing away. Rudeus quietly cremates the old man's corpse and carefully inspects the basement, finding the Petrification-infected rat he was warned about. Realizing the old man really was his future self, Rudeus decides to read his diary to find out his story.
| 61 | 13 | "The Diary"; Transliteration: "Nikki" (Japanese: 日記) | Directed by : Ryō Ishimaru, Mizuki Sakuma, Ruvu Ōshima & Ryōsuke Shibuya; Storyboarded by : Tomohiko Itō, Shinji Itadaki & Ryōsuke Shibuya | Ryōsuke Shibuya | Ikuma Fujibe | September 21, 2026 |
Rudeus reads the diary of his alternate self. In the alternate world, Rudeus is shocked to learn Roxy, unknowingly pregnant with his child, is afflicted with Petrification Sickness. He, Cliff, and Zanoba head to Millis to steal the only sacred text containing the spell needed to cure Roxy, but Rudeus is forced to kill several Millis knights, and Cliff dies from a poisoned arrow. Returning to Sharia, Rudeus encounters Eris, who wishes to marry him, but he is still traumatized and rejects her. Unfortunately, he is too late to save Roxy, and he falls out with Elinalise because of Cliff's death. Devastated, he turns to alcoholism and cheats on Sylphie with a prostitute. Discovering this, Sylphie angrily leaves Rudeus to help Ariel in Asura. Rudeus follows Sylphie to Asura but discovers she was already executed as a rebel. Rudeus subsequently destroys Asura in a rage and goes into a downward spiral that causes his remaining family to leave him, with only Aisha later returning to take care of him. After hitting a dead end in her research, Nanahoshi hangs herself. Rudeus helps Zanoba create an automaton in Sylphie's image, but destroys it in his grief. The Man-God then contacts him, gloating that his plan to arrange Roxy's death was a success and that he no longer has any use for him. Afterwards, Rudeus goes on a quest for vengeance against the Man-God, searching for leads at any cost, but cannot prevent a Millis attack on his home that results in the deaths of Aisha, Zanoba, Ginger, and Julie. Rudeus then battles Atofe to question her, resulting in Eris taking a fatal blow meant for him, with Ghislaine telling him that Eris never stopped loving him. In his advanced age, Rudeus continues to research the Man-God and finds out he resides in the "World of Naught", but he currently has no means to reach there. Using a combination of Summoning and Dragon magic, he teleports to the past to warn his younger self. After passing his warning, he uses his Mystic Eye to see the images of Sylphie and Roxy before passing away.
| 62 | 14 | "Resolve"; Transliteration: "Kakugo" (Japanese: 覚悟) | Directed by : Satoru Yamashita & Hiroki Nagashima; Storyboarded by : Ryōsuke Shibuya & Ayumu Uwano | Atsushi Takayama | Ikuma Fujibe, Satoshi Shimada, Jia Li & Keiya Nakano | September 28, 2026 |
Haunted by what happened to his future self, Rudeus continues harboring fears of losing his family. He decides to follow his future self's advice by writing a letter to reach out to Eris. He also comes clean to Sylphie and Roxy about his nightmare about the future, and that he would like to bring Eris into the family. While reluctant at first, Sylphie and Roxy agree to support Rudeus on the condition they be allowed to meet Eris first. That night, the Man-God approaches Rudeus and complains how the future Rudeus ruined his plans. Rudeus maintains his cool and assures since nothing has happened to him yet, he will not consider the Man-God his enemy. The Man-God then explains that his greatest enemy is Orsted, who is out to kill him. Thankfully, Orsted's curse means that he can never gather the allies he needs. However, Rudeus is not affected by the curse, and his descendants will inherit this trait, and they will eventually ally with Orsted and kill the Man-God. In addition, Rudeus and his family's powerful "destiny" makes it difficult to interfere in their affairs, so the Man-God chose to kill Roxy while she was pregnant since that would be when she is the most vulnerable. While still not trusting the Man-God, Rudeus agrees to kill Orsted so he will leave his family alone. He makes an addition to his letter to Eris and sends it. Eris is about to leave for Sharia when she receives the letter, and upon learning Rudeus intends to challenge Orsted, eagerly leaves to assist him.
