= Mushoku Tensei season 1 =

Mushoku Tensei: Jobless Reincarnation
- Season 1
- Japanese cover art for the fourth Blu-ray volume of the season as released by Toho Animation
- No. of episodes: 23

Release
- Original network: Tokyo MX, KBS, BS11, SUN
- Original release: January 11 – December 20, 2021

Season chronology
- Next → Season 2

Mushoku Tensei: Jobless Reincarnation is a Japanese anime television series based on Rifujin na Magonote's light novel series of the same title. The series follows a jobless and hopeless man who dies after having a sad and reclusive life and reincarnates in a fantasy world while keeping his memories, determined to enjoy his second chance at life without regrets as Rudeus Greyrat. The first season of the anime series adapts the first six volumes of the light novels.

The first season was directed by Manabu Okamoto and animated by Studio Bind, with Kazutaka Sugiyama designing the characters, and Yoshiaki Fujisawa composing the music. Egg Firm is credited for production. The series was originally scheduled to premiere in 2020, but was delayed to January 2021. The first part aired from January 11 to March 22, 2021, on Tokyo MX, KBS, BS11, and SUN. (Note: Tokyo MX listed the series premiere as January 10, 2021, at 24:00, which is effectively January 11 at midnight JST.) The second part was originally set to premiere in July 2021, but was delayed to October 2021. The second part aired from October 4 to December 20, 2021. (Note: Tokyo MX listed the second part premiere as October 3, 2021, at 24:00, which is effectively October 4 at midnight JST.) The season ran for 23 episodes. Toho Animation released both parts of the first season on Blu-ray across 4 volumes, with the first volume releasing on April 21, 2021. The anime's fourth Blu-ray volume was released on March 16, 2022, and included an extra OVA episode.

The first opening theme song is "Tabibito no Uta" (旅人の唄; lit. 'The Traveler's Song'). The second opening theme song is "Mezame no Uta" (目覚めの唄; lit. 'The Awakening Song'). The third opening theme song is "Keishō no Uta" (継承の唄; lit. 'The Inheritance Song'). The fourth opening theme song is "Inori no Uta" (祈りの唄; lit. 'The Prayer Song'). The fifth opening theme song is "Tōku no Komori no Uta" (遠くの子守の唄; lit. 'A Distant Child Guard Song'). The first cour ending theme song is "Only" (オンリー), while the second cour ending theme song is "Kaze to Iku Michi" (風と行く道; lit. 'The Way to Go With the Wind'). All of the openings and endings for the season were performed by Yuiko Ōhara.

Funimation licensed the series and streamed it on its website in North America, Mexico, Brazil and the British Isles, in parts of Europe, Central Asia and North Africa through Wakanim, and in Australia and New Zealand through AnimeLab. The series also streamed on Hulu in the United States. On February 13, 2021, Funimation announced the series would be receiving an English dub, with the first episode premiering the next day. Following Sony's acquisition of Crunchyroll, the series was moved to the streaming platform. Crunchyroll released the first 11 episodes on DVD and Blu-ray in North America on December 5, 2022, with the latter 12 episodes a well as the OVA episode being released by the company on March 7, 2023. Crunchyroll also released the first season across two Blu-ray volumes in the United Kingdom and across two Blu-ray and DVD volumes in Australia.

Muse Communication has licensed the series in Southeast Asia and South Asia and streamed it on their Muse Asia YouTube channel and its respective regional variants, and on iQIYI, Bilibili and WeTV in Southeast Asia, Netflix in South Asia and Southeast Asia, Catchplay in Indonesia and Singapore, meWatch in Singapore, and Sushiroll in Indonesia.

== Episodes ==
No. overall	No. in season	Title	Directed by (Note: Production staff information is taken from the ending credits of each episode.)	Written by	Chief animation directed by	Original release date
Part 1
1	1	"Jobless Reincarnation"; Transliteration: "Mushoku Tensei" (Japanese: 無職転生)	Directed by : Hiroki Hirano; Storyboarded by : Manabu Okamoto	Manabu Okamoto	Kazutaka Sugiyama	January 11, 2021 (Note: Episodes 1 and 2 were pre-screened on December 27, 2020.)
After being hit by a truck and dying, a homeless and jobless Japanese man reincarnates into a fantasy-like world as Rudeus Greyrat, son of the swordsman Paul Greyrat and his wife, the healer Zenith. Keeping his memories of his previous life, Rudeus quickly learns to read and eventually starts practicing magic. Noticing his aptitude, Rudeus's parents hire the adventurer Roxy Migurdia as his magic teacher. Roxy initially doubts about tutoring him due to his tender age until she witnesses his unique ability to cast magic without incantations and realizes his potential. As the Greyrat family gives Roxy a welcome party, Rudeus vows to work hard to improve himself and make proper use of the second chance he was given to have a happy and fulfilling life.
2	2	"Master"; Transliteration: "Shishō" (Japanese: 師匠)	Directed by : Hiroki Hirano; Storyboarded by : Manabu Okamoto & Hiroki Hirano	Manabu Okamoto	Yoshiko Saitō	January 18, 2021
Rudeus reminisces about his past life when he was expelled from home and was hit by the truck that killed him while attempting to save some teenagers. He spends the next months training magic with Roxy until the day of his five-year-old birthday party when Roxy declares that she has nothing more to teach him and will hold his graduation exam. The next day, Rudeus, accompanied by Roxy, leaves his home for the first time. He gets distressed over his past trauma when he was severely bullied by his classmates in school, which led to him becoming a recluse. Still, he ends up overcoming it once he realizes how Roxy has blended well with the villagers despite all the prejudice she usually suffers due to her demon origin. In the exam, Rudeus manages to summon a massive thunderstorm, and Roxy declares that he has passed. Roxy then departs to continue her journey, and Rudeus thanks her for everything she has done for him.
3	3	"A Friend"; Transliteration: "Tomodachi" (Japanese: 友達)	Directed by : Chiaki Ōji; Storyboarded by : Manabu Okamoto & Chiaki Ōji	Hiroki Hirano	Yoshiko Saitō	January 25, 2021
After losing his fear of leaving his home thanks to Roxy, Rudeus starts playing outdoors by himself until he rescues a quarter-elf child, whom he assumes is a boy named Sylph, from a group of bullies. Sylph becomes friends with Rudeus and starts learning magic from him, and it is revealed Sylph is capable of casting magic without incantations as well. Six months later, Rudeus brings Sylph home during a storm and takes away Sylph's clothes by force so that they can take a bath together. However, he discovers that Sylph is a girl whose full name is Sylphiette. Despite Rudeus's apology to Sylphiette, she starts avoiding him, much to his chagrin. Sometime later, Sylphiette approaches Rudeus, and the two make up, with Rudeus determined to cherish the first true friend he has made in his new life.
4	4	"Emergency Family Meeting"; Transliteration: "Kinkyū Kazoku Kaigi" (Japanese: 緊急家族会議)	Directed by : Nao Miyoshi & Asahi Oka; Storyboarded by : Hiroki Hirano	Manabu Okamoto	Toshimitsu Kobayashi, Masaru Yoshioka, Atsushi Aono, Taeko Ōgi & Yukiyo Komito (Note: De facto via animation director credits)	February 1, 2021
The Greyrat family is overjoyed upon learning that Zenith is pregnant again. However, their happiness is cut short when their maid, Lilia, reveals that she is also pregnant after having an affair with Paul. To protect Lilia from Zenith's wrath, Rudeus convinces his mother to forgive her by having Paul take all the blame for the incident, despite realizing that she was the one who seduced him, which earns him Lilia's gratitude and loyalty. Zenith and Lilia give birth to two girls, Norn and Aisha, respectively. Rudeus considers leaving to study at the Ranoa University of Magic after receiving a letter from Roxy encouraging him to. Still, Sylphiette does not want him to leave her side, and he decides to look for a job to pay for her tuition as well. Sometime later, his parents decide to entrust Rudeus to a friend of theirs, the beast woman Ghislaine Dedoldia, who leaves the village with him.
5	5	"A Young Lady and Violence"; Transliteration: "Ojōsama to Bōryoku" (Japanese: お嬢様と暴力)	Hiroyuki Takashima	Manabu Okamoto	Yoshiko Saitō	February 8, 2021
As Ghislaine and Rudeus leave the village, he reads a letter from Paul explaining that he found a tutoring job for him to pay for his and Sylphiette's studies. However, Paul forbids him from returning home or meeting Sylphiette for the next five years, as he felt the two have become co-dependent on each other. In the city of Roa, Rudeus meets his employer, Philip Boreas Greyrat, who is also Roa's mayor and his father's cousin, and is tasked to teach Philip's daughter, Eris. However, once Rudeus is introduced to Eris, she acts hostile towards him. Certain that Eris will not listen to him at all, Rudeus conjures a plan to gain her trust by faking their kidnapping with her father's consent. Rudeus and Eris are captured, and after convincing her to cooperate, he uses his magic to escape with her. Back in Roa, Rudeus discovers that one of Philip's servants is working with their captors, who took advantage of his plan to stage a real kidnapping. Rudeus fights the kidnappers to protect Eris until Ghislaine comes to their rescue, killing the criminals and arresting the servant. Once they return home, Eris accepts Rudeus as her tutor, and he begins living in her house.
6	6	"A Day Off in Roa"; Transliteration: "Roa no Kyūjitsu" (Japanese: ロアの休日)	Directed by : Mihiro Yamaguchi, Takahiro Tamano, Ōri Yasukawa & Hiroki Hirano; Storyboarded by : Kazuya Aiura	Hiroki Hirano	Miyachi	February 15, 2021
Philip thanks Rudeus for protecting Eris and warns him not to reveal his connections with the Greyrat family to anyone, or he may be targeted again. While Ghislaine begins teaching swordsmanship to Eris and Rudeus, Rudeus teaches Eris and Ghislaine magic, literacy, and math. However, Eris usually skips classes out of boredom, and Rudeus decides to give her one day off per week to encourage her. While taking a stroll in the city, Eris attempts to buy Rudeus an expensive book, but he refuses, claiming that she cannot give presents to others without her own money and suggesting her father give her an allowance. With her allowance, Eris presents Rudeus with a vial he was previously interested in, which puts him in a pinch, as he fears revealing to her and Ghislaine that it is, in fact, an aphrodisiac.
7	7	"What Lies Beyond Effort"; Transliteration: "Doryoku no Saki ni Aru Mono" (Japanese: 努力の先にあるもの)	Katsuya Shigehara	Manabu Okamoto & Hirohisa Saitō	Yoshiko Saitō	February 22, 2021
With Eris's tenth birthday party approaching, Rudeus allows her dance teacher to take over part of his tutoring schedule to help her improve. At the same time, he makes use of his newfound free time to learn other languages. Despite that, Eris barely improves her dancing and considers giving up, but Rudeus encourages her to continue and starts helping with her lessons. As Rudeus makes some progress on his foreign language skills with Ghislaine and Roxy's help, Eris does not improve at all, and on the day of the party, she fails to dance with another noble. Rudeus steps in and successfully dances with Eris after instructing her to incorporate some of her fighting skills in her moves. After the party, Rudeus meets Eris's grandfather and the head of the greater Fittoa region, Sauros, who sees a strange ball of light in the sky and fears it could be an ominous sign.
8	8	"Turning Point 1"; Transliteration: "Tāningu Pointo Ichi" (Japanese: ターニングポイント１)	Tenpei Mishio	Manabu Okamoto & Hirohisa Saitō	Mizuki Takahashi	March 1, 2021
Two years later, Eris and her family hold a birthday party for Rudeus, who is disappointed at first that his own family could not attend due to the increase of monster activity around the country. Rudeus is presented with a top-quality magic staff, and Philip expresses his will to have Rudeus marry Eris and become his successor, but Rudeus rejects the offer. Later that night, Rudeus is surprised to see Eris waiting in his room. He then attempts to have sex with her, but she pushes him away. Realizing his mistake, Rudeus apologizes to Eris, who forgives him. A few days later, a huge cloud of mana forms in the sky, and the legendary hero Perugius Dola sends his aide Arumanfi to investigate. Suspicious that Rudeus, who was practicing with his new staff alongside Eris and Ghislaine, could be involved with the cloud's appearance, Arumanfi attacks him, but Ghislaine defends Rudeus and confirms his innocence when a massive burst of light envelops them.
9	9	"A Chance Encounter"; Transliteration: "Kaikō" (Japanese: 邂逅)	Directed by : Takahiro Tamano & Hiroki Hirano; Storyboarded by : Atsushi Kobayashi	Hiroki Hirano	Miyako Nishida	March 8, 2021
Inside his dreams, and looking like his past self, Rudeus has a short encounter with an elusive being known as the Man-God, who instructs him to rely on and help the man who saved him. He then awakens in his current body and learns that he and Eris are stranded in the middle of the Demon Continent and were rescued by Ruijerd Superdia, a member of the dreaded Superd race, who becomes their friend and promises to escort them home. Ruijerd brings Rudeus and Eris to the nearby Migurd village, which is Roxy's birthplace. During their stay, Rudeus learns from Ruijerd that his tribe's ill repute comes from the cursed spears they received from the Demon-God Laplace, which turned them into mindless murderers, and that the spear in his possession belonged to his son, whose death by his hands made him recover his senses. Moved by Ruijerd's determination to clear his race's name, Rudeus decides to help him, and the trio departs from the village to begin their journey across the Demon Continent.
10	10	"The Value of a Life and the First Job"; Transliteration: "Hito no Inochi to Hatsu Shigoto" (Japanese: 人の命と初仕事)	Directed by : Hiroki Hirano & Ōri Yasukawa; Storyboarded by : Shizutaka Sugawara & Hiroki Hirano	Manabu Okamoto & Hirohisa Saitō	Miyachi & Yoshiko Saitō	March 15, 2021
Rudeus, Eris, and Ruijerd arrive at the city of Rikarisu. To have Ruijerd enter the city without trouble, Rudeus dyes his hair and has him pretend to be a member of the Migurd tribe. The three become an official party of adventurers called "Dead End," but their novice status prevents them from taking quests that pay well enough for them to make ends meet. By the Man-God's suggestion, Rudeus accepts a quest to look for a lost pet, which leads them to another group of adventurers who kidnap pets to get the bounty for finding them. After the kidnappers are defeated, Rudeus attempts to interrogate them, but is hit by one of them, which leads Ruijerd to kill him instantly. Rudeus reprimands Ruijerd for it and forbids him from killing again. Taking advantage of the kidnappers' higher rank, Rudeus coerces them into taking higher-ranking jobs for their own party while helping improve their reputation.
11	11	"Children and Warriors"; Transliteration: "Kodomo to Senshi" (Japanese: 子供と戦士)	Shingo Fujii	Muneo Nakamoto	Mizuki Takahashi	March 22, 2021
After the Mana Surge in Fitoa, all of Paul's family members are missing except for Norn, and he asks for his contacts to make search parties to find them. Meanwhile, to accomplish a quest, Rudeus's party looks for a mysterious monster in the middle of a forest. They encounter two other parties also searching for the monster. One of the parties is ambushed by monsters, but Rudeus decides to wait, which ends with one of the adventurers being killed. The monster they are looking for attacks and kills the other party before Rudeus and co slay it. Back in Rikarisu, Rudeus is approached by another adventurer, who discovers his scheme to take higher-ranked quests and attempts to blackmail him. Moved by Rudeus's resolve to protect Eris, Ruijerd drops his disguise, revealing himself as a Superd, and threatens to kill the adventurer should he reveal their secret. After leaving the city, Rudeus reconciles with Ruijerd. Rudeus keeps traveling with Eris and Ruijerd all the way to a coastal city on the edge of the Demon Continent, unaware that Roxy is also arriving at the continent to look for him, accompanied by two of Paul's former companions.
Part 2
12	12	"The Woman with the Demon Eyes"; Transliteration: "Magan o Motsu Onna" (Japanese: 魔眼を持つ女)	Directed by : Fumiaki Kataoka; Storyboarded by : Atsushi Kobayashi	Kōhei Urushibara	Mizuki Takahashi & Miyachi	October 4, 2021
After traveling for a year, Rudeus and his party finally arrive at a coastal city with a port while Roxy and her party arrive at the same time by boat, but both parties fail to encounter each other. Unfortunately, Rudeus and Eris learn that due to Ruijerd being a Superd, his boat fee to travel the ocean to the neighboring Millis Continent is too high for them to pay. While looking for a solution, Rudeus is once again contacted by Man-God, who instructs him to buy some food in a specific place, where he stumbles upon a hungry vagrant and feeds her. The vagrant reveals herself as the reincarnated Demon Emperor Kishirika Kishirisu, who rewards him with a Demon Eye that allows him to see a few seconds in the future. Rudeus uses this power to save a man from harm. After getting used to his new ability, Rudeus decides to sell his staff to get enough money for Ruijerd's ticket, but Ruijerd himself dissuades him from doing so, pointing out it will hurt Eris's feelings. Then, the man Rudeus saved arrives and introduces himself as Gallus Cleaner.
13	13	"Missed Connections"; Transliteration: "Surechigai" (Japanese: すれ違い)	Directed by : Yoshitsugu Kimura; Storyboarded by : Hiroki Hirano	Atsushi Takayama	Yoshiko Saitō & Mizuki Takahashi	October 11, 2021
Roxy and her companions, Talhand and Elinalise, begin searching the city for any sign of Paul's missing family, including Rudeus. Unfortunately, since Rudeus has been traveling under an alias, Roxy doesn't realize he is in the same city. As Roxy explores the city, she comes across Eris and Ruijerd sparring, but flees when she assumes they are both Superds. Failing to find any information, Roxy and her party leave for the next town. Meanwhile, Rudeus and his party are able to leave the city by sea after Gallus helps smuggle Ruijerd onto the ship in return for Rudeus "liberating" some goods for him in Zant Port. Upon reaching Zant, Rudeus heads to the smuggler's hideout, where he finds out he is supposed to liberate beast children being held captive by the smugglers. Ruijerd kills all the smugglers and escorts the children to safety, while Rudeus stays behind to free a magical dog. However, he is ambushed and captured by a pair of beastmen who were also looking to save the children and their Sacred Beast. Mistaking Rudeus as one of the smugglers, they take him to their village for questioning.
14	14	"No Such Thing As a Free Lunch"; Transliteration: "Tada yori Takai Mono wa Nai" (Japanese: 只より高いものはない)	Yoshinobu Tokumoto	Hirohisa Saitō, Kōhei Urushibara & Manabu Okamoto	Yoshiko Saitō	October 18, 2021
Rudeus is imprisoned in Doldia Village, later joined by another human prisoner, a rogue named Geese. A few days later, the village is attacked by the smugglers seeking to kidnap beast children, and both Rudeus and Geese break free and help the villagers. Together, they defeat all enemies except for Gallus, who reveals himself as the head of the smuggling ring who deceived him in order to use Ruijerd as a distraction to lure the village's warriors away. Gallus overpowers the village guardian Gyes and kills two of his men. Realizing that Gallus is too strong to deal with alone, Rudeus considers letting him escape until the Sacred Beast arrives to help, and all parties defeat him together. After the battle, Rudeus reunites with Eris and Ruijerd, who explain that they were delayed due to helping the Doldians wipe out the rest of the smuggling ring. The villagers apologize for falsely accusing Rudeus and thanking him for his help. Back at Fittoa, Eris's grandfather is blamed for the situation at the city after the Mana Surge, stripped of his position and executed before the king.
15	15	"Slow Life in the Doldia Village"; Transliteration: "Dorudia Mura no Surō Raifu" (Japanese: ドルディア村のスローライフ)	Katsuya Shigehara	Hirohisa Saitō, Kōhei Urushibara & Manabu Okamoto	Mizuki Takahashi	October 25, 2021
With the rainy season starting, Rudeus and his party are forced to stay in Doldia Village for the next three months. During this time, Eris befriends some of the beast children, including Tona, Gyes's daughter. However, when Ghislaine's name is mentioned, this elicits a negative reaction from Gyes, who reveals that Ghislaine is his younger sister who left the village long ago and is considered a traitor for refusing to become a village guardian. This sparks Tona's interest in learning sword fighting, and Eris gladly becomes her instructor. Three months later, Rudeus and his party are preparing to depart after the rains stop. However, Tona doesn't want Eris to leave and has a falling out with her over it. Gyes manages to convince her to apologize by revealing that Ghislaine was very rebellious when she was young, and the village allowed her to be taken away by an adventurer to be rid of her. He has come to regret letting Ghislaine leave without trying to understand her. Rudeus and his party then leave for the Holy Country of Millis while Geese hitches a ride with them.
16	16	"Family Squabble"; Transliteration: "Oyako Genka" (Japanese: 親子げんか)	Directed by : Michiru Itabisashi; Storyboarded by : Yoshinobu Tokumoto & Tatsuyuki Nagai	Kōhei Urushibara	Miyachi	November 1, 2021
The party reaches the capital city of Millis, Millishion. Geese parts ways with the group while Rudeus decides everyone should take the day off. However, Rudeus notices what appears to be a kidnapping taking place and follows the kidnappers. He confronts the kidnappers and is surprised to see Paul is their leader. Paul explains that their hometown was caught in the teleportation disaster, and he and his party have spent the past year and a half tracking down the missing villagers and their families. When Rudeus tells Paul about his journey from the Demon Continent, Paul asks Rudeus why he never tried to write a letter home or even think about the other victims of the disaster, to which Rudeus has no answer. They both get into a fight, which is only broken up by Norn's intervention. Seeing Paul's party scorning him triggers memories of being shunned in his past life, and Rudeus flees. Seeing Rudeus in a poor mood, Eris does her best to cheer him up, which he is grateful for.
17	17	"Reunion"; Transliteration: "Saikai" (Japanese: 再会)	Directed by : Hiroyuki Takashima; Storyboarded by : Tatsuyuki Nagai	Muneo Nakamoto	Yoshiko Saitō	November 8, 2021
Geese pays a visit to Paul, revealing he is a member of Paul's party, and encourages him to make amends with Rudeus, reminding him that Rudeus is still just a child. Paul has nightmares about what could have happened to Rudeus and decides to quit drinking. The next day, Rudeus and Paul meet again. While the meeting starts off awkwardly, Rudeus realizes Paul misinterpreted his initial intentions and is trying to apologize for it. After having a heart-to-heart, they tearfully reconcile. In the occasion, Rudeus reveals that he will begin looking for the rest of his family after escorting Eris home, despite knowing that her family is still missing. After parting ways with Rudeus, Paul learns from Geese that he will continue searching for the rest of Paul's family, traveling to places they have not checked yet.
18	18	"Separate Journeys"; Transliteration: "Sorezore no Tabi" (Japanese: それぞれの旅)	Directed by : Chihiro Kumano; Storyboarded by : Taichi Yumemi	Atsushi Takayama	Mizuki Takahashi	November 15, 2021
While Rudeus and his party cross the sea to the Central Continent, Roxy returns to her home village, where she reunites with her parents. Still feeling herself displaced for being unable to use telepathy to communicate with her fellow villagers, Roxy considers leaving immediately but reconsiders after realizing how much her parents missed her. Roxy learns from her parents that Rudeus visited them two years ago. Relieved that he is safe, she departs with her companions to keep searching the Demon Continent for the rest of his family.
19	19	"Route Selection"; Transliteration: "Rūto Sentaku" (Japanese: ルート選択)	Yoshinobu Tokumoto	Shigekazu Kondō & Manabu Okamoto	Yoshiko Saitō	November 22, 2021
Rudeus has another encounter with the Man-God, who instructs him on how to reunite with Lilia and Aisha. Once arriving at the Kingdom of Shirone, Rudeus sends a letter to Roxy, who works as a teacher in the palace, and rescues Aisha from some pursuers. Following the advice of the Man-God, Rudeus refrains from revealing his identity to his sister, who thinks Rudeus is a pervert due to finding Roxy's panties that Lilia had confiscated from him. Rudeus is then summoned to the palace for an audience with Roxy but falls into a trap set by Shirone's seventh prince, Pax, who holds Lilia hostage. Infatuated with Roxy, Pax reveals that he intends to use Rudeus as bait to capture her.
20	20	"The Birth of My Little Sister, the Maid"; Transliteration: "Imōto Jijo no Umareta Hi" (Japanese: 妹侍女の生まれた日)	Katsuya Shigehara	Shigekazu Kondō & Manabu Okamoto	Kō Aine & Mizuki Takahashi	November 29, 2021
While waiting in his cell, Rudeus is met by Shirone's third prince, Zanoba, who idolizes him for making such lifelike sculptures of Roxy and Ruijerd and seeks to become his apprentice. When Rudeus explains that only Pax can undo the seal on his cell, Zanoba promises to resolve the situation. Meanwhile, Pax's guards smuggle Ruijerd, Eris, and Aisha into the palace in return for rescuing their families, who are being held hostage by Pax. Zanoba then captures Pax, with Aisha revealing that Zanoba is a Blessed Child born with superhuman strength and known as the Decapitator Prince. Zanoba coerces Pax into freeing Rudeus while Pax's guards refuse to help the moment they hear their families are safe. Afterward, Lilia and Aisha are arranged to be sent home, and Lilia returns Roxy's panties to Rudeus and gives him a necklace Sylphiette made for his tenth birthday. Rudeus then gifts his forehead protector to Aisha as a keepsake. As she leaves, Aisha apologizes to Rudeus for calling him a pervert, revealing she knew his true identity all along. Meanwhile, Pax and Zanoba are exiled from the Shirone Kingdom due to the scandal under the guise of studying abroad.
21	21	"Turning Point 2"; Transliteration: "Tāningu Pointo Ni" (Japanese: ターニングポイント２)	Hiroyuki Takashima	Shigekazu Kondō & Manabu Okamoto	Yoshiko Saitō	December 6, 2021
Rudeus, Eris, and Ruijerd continue their journey when they come across Orsted, the Dragon God. Eris and Ruijerd are stricken with fear and refuse to move, but Rudeus, ignoring their warnings, talks with him. Orsted inquires Rudeus about the Man-God and, believing Rudeus to be one of his apostles, attacks him. Ruijerd and Eris try to protect Rudeus but are easily defeated by Orsted, who mortally wounds Rudeus. As he dies, Rudeus meets the Man-God, who reveals that Orsted is afflicted with several curses, including one that makes all living beings fear him irrationally, but somehow Rudeus was not affected. Despite not knowing the Man-God's real intentions, Rudeus thanks him for his help. Instead of dying, Rudeus returns to the world of the living, where he learns that Orsted's companion, Nanahoshi, interceded in his favor and convinced Orsted to save his life and spare him before the two left.
22	22	"Dreams and Reality"; Transliteration: "Genjitsu (Yume)" (Japanese: 現実(ユメ) (Note: The Ruby text in this case is used to provide a subtitle rather than serve as Japanese phonology.))	Directed by : Kai Hasako; Storyboarded by : Hiroki Hirano	Atsushi Takayama	Nanako Ninomiya	December 13, 2021
During the night, Rudeus reveals the nature of the Man-God to Ruijerd and the fact that the Superd curse on him is gradually fading away. The next day, the party reaches the ruins of Rudeus's hometown, where he has flashbacks to his early life there. Ruijerd then announces that since Rudeus and Eris are strong enough that they do not require his protection anymore, he will take his leave. Rudeus and Eris bid Ruijerd farewell before continuing on to Roa, which is also in ruins. There, Eris reunites with Ghislaine and her servant Alphonse. However, Alphonse reveals that Eris's parents were both killed as a result of the teleportation incident while the king executed her grandfather. Alphonse also explains that another branch of the Greyrat family led by Lord Pilemon has offered to allow Eris to marry into them to preserve the family line, though Ghislaine is against it. Rudeus later finds confirmation that Sylphiette was not found dead, but her location remains unknown to him. That night, Eris enters Rudeus's tent and has sex with him. The next morning, however, Rudeus wakes up to find that Eris has left with Ghislaine to an unknown location, which leaves him distraught and confused.
23	23	"Wake Up and Take a Step"; Transliteration: "Mezame, Ippo," (Japanese: 目覚め、一歩、)	Directed by : Chihiro Kumano; Storyboarded by : Manabu Okamoto	Muneo Nakamoto & Rifujin na Magonote	Yoshiko Saitō, Hiroyuki Saita & Mizuki Takahashi	December 20, 2021
Rudeus falls into a state of depression and begins having flashbacks to his old life, where severe bullying at school traumatized him into becoming a social recluse. Meanwhile, Eris has left on her own journey with Ghislaine so that she can grow strong enough to fight Orsted and protect Rudeus. Ruijerd rescues some travelers from beasts, earning their praise despite revealing his identity as a Superd to them. Zanoba and Geese continue on their respective journeys as they recall Rudeus fondly. Gyes and Tona continue to train together in Doldia Village. Roxy encounters Kishirika and helps pay her enormous bar tab. In gratitude, Kishirika uses her Demon Eyes to locate the whereabouts of Rudeus's family, revealing Aisha and Lilia have safely reunited with Paul and Norn, while Zenith is located in the Labyrinth City of Rapan on the Begaritt Continent. Roxy and her party immediately make preparations to leave for the Begaritt Continent to rescue her. Rudeus is still depressed, but after having a dream about Zenith, he remembers he still has a duty to find her and overcomes his insecurities to continue his journey. Elsewhere, Sylphiette, who is alive and now has white hair, tries to convince an unknown group to recruit Rudeus into their ranks.

== Home media release ==
=== Japanese ===
Toho Animation (Japan – Region 2/A)
Chapter	Episodes	Artwork	Release date	Ref.
1	1–5	Rudeus Greyrat and Roxy Migurdia	April 21, 2021	
2	6–11	Rudeus Greyrat and Sylphiette	June 23, 2021	
3	12–17	Rudeus and Eris Boreas Greyrat	January 19, 2022	
4	18–23 + OVA	Rudeus Greyrat, Roxy Migurdia, Eris Boreas Greyrat and Sylphiette	March 16, 2022	

=== English ===
Crunchyroll (North America – Region 1/A)
Part		Episodes	Regular edition release date	Limited edition release date	Ref.
Season 1	1	1–11	December 5, 2022		
Season 1	2	12–23 + OVA	March 7, 2023	N/A	
