= Mushoku Tensei season 2 =

Mushoku Tensei II: Jobless Reincarnation
- Season 2
- Japanese cover art for the first Blu-ray volume of the season as released by Toho Animation
- No. of episodes: 25 (Note: Number count total includes "Episode 0")

Release
- Original network: Tokyo MX, KBS, BS11, SUN
- Original release: July 3, 2023 – July 1, 2024

Season chronology
- ← Previous; Season 1 Next → Season 3

The second season of the anime television series Mushoku Tensei: Jobless Reincarnation, also marketed as Mushoku Tensei II: Jobless Reincarnation, is based on Rifujin na Magonote's light novel series of the same title. The series follows a jobless and hopeless man who dies after having a sad and reclusive life and reincarnates in a fantasy world while keeping his memories, determined to enjoy his second chance at life without regrets as Rudeus Greyrat. The second season of the anime series adapts volumes seven to twelve of the light novels. Now a grown teenager, Rudeus travels the world alone in search of his missing mother, later enrolling at the Ranoa University of Magic where he reunites with his childhood friend Sylphie. "Episode 0" focuses on the whereabouts of Sylphie after the magic crisis from the middle of the previous season, which resulted in her being transported.

In March 2022, it was announced that a second season had been green-lit. The season was directed by Hiroki Hirano, with scripts supervised by Toshiya Ono, and character designs handled by Sanae Shimada. The second season consists of 25 episodes and aired in two split season cours. The first part aired from July 3 to September 25, 2023 (Note: Tokyo MX listed the season premiere as July 2, 2023, at 24:00, which is effectively July 3 at midnight JST.) and the second part aired from April 8, 2024, to July 1, 2024. (Note: Tokyo MX listed the second part premiere as April 7, 2024, at 24:00, which is effectively April 8 at midnight JST.) The second season was collected into a total of four Blu-ray volumes in Japan between October 18, 2023, and September 18, 2024.

For the first cour, the opening theme song is "Spiral" performed by Longman while the ending theme song is "Musubime" (ムスビメ; lit. 'Knot') performed by Yuiko Ōhara. For the second cour, the opening theme song is "On the Frontline" (オン・ザ・フロントライン) performed by Hitorie while the ending theme song is "Mamoritai Mono" (守りたいもの; lit. 'What I Want to Protect') performed by Yuiko Ōhara. Episodes 0 and 12 of the season respectively use the special ending theme songs "Clover", performed by Yuiko Ōhara, and "Hanasakimi" (花咲み; lit. 'Flowers Blooming'), performed by Ai Kayano.

== Episodes ==
No. overall	No. in season	Title	Directed by (Note: Production staff information is taken from the ending credits of each episode.)	Written by	Chief animation directed by	Original release date
Part 1
24	0	"Guardian Fitz"; Transliteration: "Shugo Jutsushi Fittsu" (Japanese: 守護術師フィッツ)	Directed by : Hakaribito Ketsuzuki; Storyboarded by : Hiroki Hirano, Yukihiro Komawo & Makoto Hirasawa	Toshiya Ono	Aya Tanaka	July 3, 2023
In the wake of the teleportation disaster, Sylphie finds herself transported to the palace of the Kingdom of Asura, where she inadvertently kills a monster threatening the life of Asura's second princess, Ariel; in the process, Sylphie's hair turns from green to white. Witnessing Sylphie's abilities, Ariel uses the threat of charging her with trespassing to blackmail her into becoming one of her bodyguards under the alias of "Fitz". Ariel is currently engaged in a secret feud with her half-brother and the first prince, Grabel, over succession to Asura's throne, with her most loyal supporters being her other bodyguard, Luke, and his father, Lord Pilemon. Later, Ariel learns that Sylphie suffers from nightmares related to the teleportation disaster, and Ariel confides that she has nightmares about her own near-death experience as well. The two decide to sleep together for the night; that night, Sylphie thwarts an assassination attempt arranged by Grabel. Pilemon suggests that Ariel study abroad for the time being for her own safety. Accepting the idea, Ariel releases Sylphie from her service, but Sylphie, who has grown to see Ariel as a friend and confidant, decides to stay with her.
25	1	"The Brokenhearted Mage"; Transliteration: "Shitsui no Majutsushi" (Japanese: 失意の魔術師)	Directed by : Ayumu Uwano; Storyboarded by : Hiroki Hirano	Toshiya Ono	Aya Tanaka	July 10, 2023
In the wake of Eris leaving him, a deeply depressed Rudeus continues his search for his mother Zenith by traveling to the remote northlands, subsequently making a stop in the Duchy of Basherant and formally disbanding the Dead End party. Needing to earn money to continue his travels, he reluctantly agrees to join the party Counter Arrow, consisting of frontline fighters Suzanne and Patrice, mage Timothy, healer Mimir, and archer Sara. However, Sara is mistrustful of Rudeus, and he finds himself comparing her to Eris in his head. He accompanies Counter Arrow on a quest to slay grizzlies, but the situation escalates when the party becomes surrounded by them. Witnessing the Counter Arrow members fighting for their lives, Rudeus regains the motivation to continue living and helps the party fight off the grizzlies. Upon returning to town, Rudeus is accepted as a member of Counter Arrow. After realizing that he has not lost everything and still has friends and family like Roxy to count on, Rudeus burns the lock of Eris's hair he had as a keepsake.
26	2	"The Forest in the Dead of Night"; Transliteration: "Mayonaka no Mori" (Japanese: 真夜中の森)	Nobuyoshi Arai	Kōhei Urushibara	Hong Zhi Sun	July 17, 2023
Several months pass, and Rudeus builds his fame and reputation in Basherant, hoping that word of his exploits will reach Zenith or that someone will know her whereabouts. He decides to accompany Counter Arrow on another quest to collect snow drake scales, but they accidentally run into another party, Stepped Leader, who are out to hunt the snow drakes. Despite this setback, Counter Arrow successfully completes the quest and returns to town, where Sara convinces Rudeus to join their victory celebration. However, during the celebration, the leader of Stepped Leader, Soldat, goes on a drunken rant, revealing that Rudeus, whom he can tell is holding back his true power, irritates him badly. The next day, Rudeus learns that Mimir has been killed and Sara has gone missing during a quest, with the rest of Counter Arrow being forced to retreat due to a blizzard. He heads into the nearby forest alone, recovers Mimir's remains, and rescues Sara. After being thanked profusely by Sara and Counter Arrow, Rudeus feels a sense of catharsis and regains more of his lost emotions.
27	3	"Abrupt Approach"; Transliteration: "Kyūsekkin" (Japanese: 急接近)	Directed by : Sayaka Tsuji; Storyboarded by : Mie Ōishi	Atsushi Takayama	Aya Tanaka	July 24, 2023
After the rescue, Sara gets closer to Rudeus, eventually deciding to ask him out on a date. Later that night, Sara flirts with Rudeus and indicates that she is willing to have sex with him. However, Rudeus discovers he is suffering from erectile dysfunction, which causes a disappointed Sara to leave. Afterward, an embarrassed Rudeus tries to drink away his sorrows and ends up venting his feelings to Soldat. Soldat, figuring that Rudeus's issues lay with his lingering subconscious feelings for Eris, agrees to help Rudeus. He takes Rudeus to a local brothel where one of the prostitutes, Elise, also fails to arouse him; she theorizes that Rudeus cannot feel passion because he fears rejection from women. On the way home, a frustrated, drunk Rudeus goes on a rant, declaring that he dislikes Sara and finds her ugly. Sara overhears his tirade; angrily confronting him, she slaps Rudeus, telling him she never wants to see him again before leaving. With his depression freshly renewed, Rudeus almost immediately tries to commit suicide, but Soldat, quickly appraising Rudeus's despair, stops him and offers to bring him along to clear a labyrinth in the neighboring Duchy of Neris. Meanwhile, Elinalise, who has been searching for Rudeus, learns he has gone to the northlands.
28	4	"Letter of Invitation"; Transliteration: "Suisenjō" (Japanese: 推薦状)	Directed by : Yoshitsugu Kimura; Storyboarded by : Ayako Kōno	Toshiya Ono	Kazuhiro Ōta (Note: De facto via animation director credits)	July 31, 2023
Rudeus spends the next two years adventuring with Soldat's party, eventually culminating in him slaying a red dragon singlehandedly. Shortly after, Elinalise finally catches up with Rudeus and informs him that Paul and Roxy have already set off to the Labyrinth City of Rapan on the Begaritt Continent to find Zenith. In the meantime, Rudeus decides to stay in the northlands until winter passes before traveling to Rapan himself; he quickly finds out about Elinalise's promiscuity. Sometime later, Rudeus receives a letter from the Ranoa University of Magic inviting him to attend as a "special student" due to his recent exploits. Rudeus is intrigued but is inclined to find Zenith first. That night, Rudeus encounters the Man-God in his dreams again, with the Man-God advising him to enroll at the university and investigate the teleportation disaster there, promising him that doing so will cure his erectile dysfunction. This persuades Rudeus to accept the university's invitation, and with Elinalise following, he journeys to the Kingdom of Ranoa, where Sylphie, Ariel, Luke, Cliff, and Zanoba are students at the same university he is set to attend.
29	5	"Ranoa University of Magic"; Transliteration: "Ranoa Mahō Daigaku" (Japanese: ラノア魔法大学)	Komari Kamikita	Kōhei Urushibara	Hong Zhi Sun	August 7, 2023
Rudeus arrives at the university, where his ability to cast spells silently is tested in a mock duel against another silent caster, a boy named Fitz, who, unbeknownst to Rudeus, is Sylphie in disguise. Rudeus easily defeats Fitz and is accepted as a student, along with Elinalise. After attending a speech by Ariel, who is the student council president, Rudeus attends his homeroom class. There, he reunites with Zanoba and meets some of his classmates: Gyes's daughter Linia Dedoldia, beastgirl Pursena, and self-proclaimed magical genius Cliff Grimoire, who tells him he knows Rudeus because of Eris. He also learns Fitz is part of his class, but rarely attends. After a brief encounter with Fitz, Rudeus meets Luke, who reveals he is also a Greyrat and Rudeus's cousin. Later, while Rudeus is on his way back to his dorm, Fitz accidentally drops Ariel's panties from a window above him; when Rudeus catches them, the female students angrily confront him, accusing him of having stolen them. The senior in charge of dorm security attempts to punish him, but Fitz arrives to defend Rudeus, forcing the mob to stand down by threatening them with violence and injury. Fitz apologizes for getting Rudeus into trouble, but Rudeus thanks Fitz for helping him, and Fitz decides to tease Rudeus by not telling him her true identity.
30	6	"I Don't Want to Die"; Transliteration: "Shinitakunai" (Japanese: 死にたくない)	Ayumu Uwano	Atsushi Takayama	Aya Tanaka	August 14, 2023
Rudeus begins to get used to school life in the university, where he studies magic he lacks experience in, as well as researches the cause of the teleportation disaster alongside Fitz. However, Rudeus begins to realize he may have a crush on Fitz, much to his confusion since he still believes Fitz is male. Meanwhile, he also attempts to teach Zanoba how to create his own sculptures, but his own lack of magic capacity and his super strength prevent him from being able to sculpt. Fitz suggests that Zanoba purchase a slave who can create sculptures for him. Rudeus, Fitz, and Zanoba then travel to the local slave market in the nearby city of Sharia and purchase a young dwarf girl they name Julie. Afterward, Rudeus begins tutoring Julie to teach her magic and general skills while she acts as Zanoba's servant.
31	7	"The Kidnapping and Confinement of Beast Girls"; Transliteration: "Kemonozoku Reijō Rachikankin Jiken" (Japanese: 獣族令嬢拉致監禁事件)	Ryōsuke Shibuya	Toshiya Ono	Takuma Yamasaki, Kōta Sera, Nanako Ninomiya, Shinobu Isoko & Shunryo Yamamura	August 21, 2023
As Sylphie gets used to school life with Rudeus back in her life, she begins to realize that she may have romantic feelings for him. One month after Zanoba purchased Julie, Rudeus has been able to teach her basic magic as well as how to cast without incantations. However, when Zanoba shows Julie Rudeus's sculpture of Rujierd, Rudeus asks about the sculpture of Roxy that he had also made. Zanoba is forced to admit that in his first year, he lost a duel to Linia and Pursena, who destroyed the sculpture. Angered at this slight against Roxy, Rudeus defeats Linia and Pursena in a fight and confines them in his room but leaves them tied up for so long that they wet themselves, forcing him to clean them up. He then consults with Fitz on the best way to punish them without creating a grudge, and Fitz comes up with the idea to prank the beastgirls by forcing them to wear embarrassing face markings for one day. Linia and Pursena leave with a grudging respect for Rudeus after learning he trained under Ghislaine, and Rudeus spends some time alone with Fitz. Fitz considers removing her sunglasses to show Rudeus her face but decides against it.
32	8	"The Fiancé of Despair"; Transliteration: "Zetsubō no Konyakusha" (Japanese: 絶望の婚約者)	Directed by : Yasuhiko Akiyama; Storyboarded by : Tomohiko Itō	Kōhei Urushibara	Yūki Miyagi & Jia Li	August 28, 2023
Cliff approaches Rudeus one day and asks him to introduce him to Elinalise, whom he has developed a crush on. Rudeus goes through with the introduction, but Elinalise privately reminds him the curse that forces her to sleep with men won't be fulfilled if she's dedicated to a single partner. Rudeus advises her to turn down Cliff's feelings, but the next day, he is shocked to see that both she and Cliff are in a genuine relationship, with Cliff promising to find a way to lift the curse. Later, the beastmen of the school begin challenging Rudeus for the right to marry Linia and Pursena, having been misled by the beastgirls that he is their pack leader. However, the beastmen are all defeated by the Demon King Badigadi, the fiancé of Kishirika, who challenges Rudeus to a duel after hearing Kishirika's praise of him. Rudeus wins the duel by wounding Badigadi with his first attack, convincing the demon king to concede. When winter arrives, Rudeus and his classmates are surprised when they discover that Badigadi has enrolled in the university and joined their class.
33	9	"The White Mask"; Transliteration: "Shiroi Kamen" (Japanese: 白い仮面)	Directed by : Kento Shintani; Storyboarded by : Hiroki Hirano	Atsushi Takayama	Aya Tanaka	September 4, 2023
Fitz wants to reveal her true identity to Rudeus but fears he might have forgotten her. She gets encouraged by Ariel's approval. Meanwhile, Rudeus continues to study teleportation and sees many similarities to summoning magic. Fitz suggests Rudeus consult with a summoning specialist, Silent Sevenstar, but is shocked to discover it is Nanahoshi and faints after reliving the trauma of his death at Orsted's hands. Fitz revives Rudeus, and Nanahoshi shows Rudeus two Japanese names, Shinohara Akito and Kuroki Satoshi, and asks if either of those names belongs to him. Rudeus doesn't recognize the names and comes to the realization that Nanahoshi is a person from his pre-reincarnation world. Nanahoshi removes her mask and formally introduces herself as Nanahoshi Shizuka, and Rudeus notes she resembles the high school girl he died attempting to save. However, Nanahoshi wants to find a way back to their world, while Rudeus wants to stay. She explains that unlike Rudeus, who was reincarnated as a child, she was summoned to the fantasy world as she is now five years ago, though she hasn't aged since. Orsted found her and took her under his care, and she has been studying summoning magic ever since, though she lacks mana capacity and cannot cast magic herself. She makes a deal with Rudeus where he will use his mana to assist her in her experiments in return for her knowledge about teleportation. She further explains that the mass teleportation disaster was possibly a side effect of the spell that summoned her to the fantasy world. On the way back, Fitz is glad to hear Rudeus has no romantic feelings for Nanahoshi.
34	10	"These Feelings"; Transliteration: "Kono Kimochi" (Japanese: この気持ち)	Takahiro Hirata	Toshiya Ono	Hong Zhi Sun	September 11, 2023
Fitz continues to feel jealous that Rudeus spends most of his time assisting in Nanahoshi's experiments but remains too afraid to reveal her identity to him. One year after enrolling in the university, Rudeus notices that the other students are in awe of him thanks to the reputation he had built up from defeating Fitz, Linia, Pursena, and Badigadi, but he turns down suggestions to take a leadership role. Later, he receives an invitation from Soldat to attend a clan reunion. After the reunion, he parts with Elinalise and Cliff, who plan to do some adventuring to give Cliff experience. After meeting Fitz again in town and the library, Rudeus realizes that he has romantic feelings for Fitz and begins to have doubts that Fitz is male. During another meeting in the library, Fitz accidentally falls on top of Rudeus, and he confirms that she is, in fact, female. Fitz flees in embarrassment, and Rudeus realizes that, for a brief moment, he felt an erection. Knowing Fitz's true sex and that she holds the key to curing his impotence, Rudeus decides to start a relationship with her.
35	11	"To You"; Transliteration: "Anata e" (Japanese: あなたへ)	Directed by : Sayaka Tsuji; Storyboarded by : Komari Kamikita	Atsushi Takayama	Aya Tanaka	September 18, 2023
With Fitz's secret now known to Rudeus, Ariel pressures her to reveal her identity to him. However, Fitz is still uncertain if Rudeus remembers her as Sylphie, so Ariel and Luke devise a plan to help jog Rudeus's memory. Later, Fitz invites Rudeus to accompany her to gather a rare flower deep in the forest despite it being the middle of winter. Rudeus agrees, and the pair travel into the forest. Fitz then secretly casts a spell to cause it to rain, soaking both her and Rudeus before they can reach shelter inside a cave. Rudeus strips off his wet clothes to avoid hypothermia and advises Fitz to do the same, but Fitz insists that Rudeus strip her instead. Rudeus complies and recognizes her as Sylphie, much to her relief. Now properly reunited with Rudeus, Sylphie admits she has fallen in love with him.
36	12	"I Want to Tell You"; Transliteration: "Tsutaetai" (Japanese: 伝えたい)	Directed by : Yoshitsugu Kimura & Tomoaki Takatsudo; Storyboarded by : Ryōsuke Shibuya	Toshiya Ono	Hong Zhi Sun	September 25, 2023
Rudeus admits he loves Sylphie as well, but to his dismay, he cannot make love to her since his impotence still isn't fully cured. Sylphie reports back to Ariel and Luke, with Luke agreeing to help Sylphie find a cure for Rudeus's impotence out of sympathy for him. Luke gifts Sylphie a rare and powerful aphrodisiac that should counter Rudeus's impotence, while Ariel provides some advice on how to seduce him. Sylphie meets Rudeus later that night, and they both imbibe the aphrodisiac, which helps push them to make love. The next morning, after realizing that Sylphie hasn't abandoned him, Rudeus experiences an emotional catharsis, overcomes the trauma caused by Eris leaving him, and is cured of his impotence. Rudeus then thanks Ariel for her help by pledging his loyalty to her and then asks for Sylphie's hand in marriage, which she accepts. Ariel releases Sylphie from her obligation to disguise herself as Fitz and accepts Rudeus as part of her inner circle. Sylphie then thanks Ariel and Luke for everything they've done for her.
Part 2
37	13	"My Dream Home"; Transliteration: "Yume no Mai Hōmu" (Japanese: 夢のマイホーム)	Directed by : Takashi Mizuzono; Storyboarded by : Ayumu Uwano	Kōhei Urushibara	Shinobu Ikakko	April 8, 2024
Now that he is engaged to Sylphie, Rudeus considers marriage, but has little idea on how it works in the fantasy world. After taking advice from Zanoba and Cliff, Rudeus decides that the first step is buying a house. He settles for an abandoned mansion that he can purchase at a very low price, but it has a reputation for being haunted, with past residents being mysteriously murdered in the night. Rudeus, Zanoba, and Cliff travel to the mansion to get to the bottom of the hauntings, and discover that the mansion is haunted by a moving doll which was created in secret by a previous resident of the mansion. Fascinated with the moving doll, Zanoba volunteers to take charge on researching it in hopes of replicating it. Rudeus then shows Sylphie the renovated mansion and formally proposes to marry her, which she accepts.
38	14	"Wedding Reception"; Transliteration: "Hirōen" (Japanese: 披露宴)	Directed by : Yui Kanbe; Storyboarded by : Tomohiko Itō	Atsushi Takayama	Hong Zhi Sun	April 15, 2024
Rudeus and Sylphie decide to organize the customary wedding reception feast, and invite all of their friends and classmates to attend, including Princess Ariel and Nanahoshi. On the day of the reception, Sylphie finally reveals her true identity to everybody. At the end of the reception, as everybody gives their blessings to Rudeus and Sylphie, Elinalise suddenly breaks down and begins to cry. Sylphie then asks Elinalise if she is her grandmother, since she heard stories her grandmother was one of Paul's companions. Elinalise confirms this, and admits that she hid her relation out of fear that her curse and reputation might bring harm to her descendants. Ariel then asks Rudeus to duel Luke to see if he is worthy to be Sylphie's husband. Rudeus easily defeats Luke, and Ariel asks him to stop Sylphie from helping her take Asura's throne so she can focus on her family. Upon seeing Elinalise reconcile with Sylphie, Cliff is even further motivated to lift her curse and asks for Rudeus's help, to which he agrees. After all of the guests leave, Rudeus and Sylphie officially begin their life as a married couple.
39	15	"Afar"; Transliteration: "Haruka" (Japanese: 遥か)	Directed by : Tomoaki Takatsudo; Storyboarded by : Shinsaku Sasaki	Toshiya Ono	Hong Zhi Sun	April 22, 2024
Rudeus receives a letter from Paul informing him that he and his party are about to depart for the Begaritt Continent to search for Zenith. However, since Begaritt is as dangerous as the Demon Continent, Paul has decided to send Aisha and Norn to live with Rudeus while he is away. Meanwhile, Nanahoshi's latest teleportation experiment ends in failure, causing her to have a nervous breakdown and go catatonic. Realizing that Nanahoshi has been overworking herself and has fallen into the same despair he had suffered, Rudeus decides to host her at his house until she recovers. Rudeus then calls his classmates together to figure out how to solve Nanahoshi's latest magic circle, which keeps malfunctioning. Zanoba suggests using compound circles, multiple magic circles layered on top of each other, which he learned studying the doll. Upon learning this new method, Nanahoshi regains her inspiration and works with Rudeus and his classmates to redesign the circle. During the next test, the magic circle successfully summons a plastic bottle from the modern world, giving Nanahoshi hope she can return to her own world. Afterwards, Nanahoshi attends a party with the rest of the class, and Rudeus notes she is much happier now that she can rely on her classmates for help. Upon returning home, Rudeus finds Aisha and Norn waiting for him, escorted by Ruijerd.
40	16	"Norn and Aisha"; Transliteration: "Norun to Aisha" (Japanese: ノルンとアイシャ)	Directed by : Sayaka Tsuji; Storyboarded by : Tomohiko Itō	Kōhei Urushibara	Kōta Sera	April 29, 2024
After catching up with Rudeus and having a brief confrontation with Badigadi, Ruijerd takes his leave, and suggests to Rudeus that Eris likely couldn't properly convey her feelings to him. While Aisha is happy to see Rudeus, Norn remains wary of him ever since his fight with Paul back at Millis and becomes isolated without Paul or Ruijerd by her side. Rudeus then reads another letter from Paul, requesting him to enroll both Aisha and Norn in the university. Aisha instead insists on taking care of all of the housework for the mansion, with Rudeus relenting when she passes the university's entrance exam with perfect marks. Norn has below average grades, and suggests that she lives in a dorm by herself, much to Aisha's chagrin. Rudeus reluctantly allows Norn to live in the university dorms in hopes of her making friends, but one month after her enrollment, he sees that she still remains isolated from her classmates. Rudeus is then forced to deal with Linia and Pursena stealing girls' underwear in an attempt to cheer him up, having to explain the situation to Ariel. Meanwhile, Norn begins to isolate herself in her room and skip her classes.
41	17	"My Older Brother's Feelings"; Transliteration: "Aniki no Kimochi" (Japanese: 兄貴の気持ち)	Directed by : Yui Kanbe; Storyboarded by : Tomohiko Itō	Naoto Taniuchi	Kōta Sera	May 6, 2024
Upon learning of Norn's situation, Rudeus confronts her class, believing they have been bullying her. However, after talking with them, Rudeus realizes that the problem is that Norn doesn't like to be compared to him, which her class were inadvertently doing. Sylphie, Linia, and Pursena help Rudeus infiltrate the girls' dorms so that he can talk to Norn personally. Upon entering Norn's room, Rudeus recalls memories of being a shut-in during his past life and how his older brother tried to help him. Meanwhile, Norn reflects on her deep seated fear of being rejected by Rudeus, as well as her classmates and teachers constantly comparing her to him. Eventually, she recalls the advice both Paul and Ruijerd gave her to trust Rudeus and realizes he is genuinely worried about her. Rudeus tells Norn that he's there for her and will listen to any problems she has. With that, Norn finally opens up to Rudeus and accepts him as her brother. Afterwards, Rudeus and Sylphie are glad to see that Norn's mood has greatly improved and she is attending classes again, with Rudeus being impressed that Norn was able to accomplish something he couldn't in his past life. He then considers asking Nanahoshi to carry a message back to their old world to apologize to and thank his older brother.
42	18	"Turning Point 3"; Transliteration: "Tāningu Pointo San" (Japanese: ターニングポイント3)	Directed by : Sayaka Tsuji; Storyboarded by : Tomohiko Itō	Toshiya Ono	Shinobu Ikakko	May 13, 2024
Rudeus spends the next few months spending time with Sylphie and his sisters, writing a book about Ruijerd, assisting Nanahoshi in her experiments, helping Cliff develop a device to counteract Elinalise's curse, and witnessing Zanoba improve his sculpting skill. One day though, Sylphie approaches Rudeus and informs him that she is pregnant, and he is overwhelmed with emotion at the thought of becoming a father. However, Rudeus later receives a letter from Geese informing him that the mission to rescue Zenith has proven more difficult than expected and he requires assistance. The Man-God then approaches Rudeus and reminds him not to go to Begaritt, warning him that traveling there and back will take at least two years meaning he will have to leave Sylphie alone and miss the birth of his child. The Man-God also advises Rudeus to have relations with Linia or Pursena during the next mating season. Despite hearing out the Man-God's advice, Rudeus is left conflicted on whether to go help Paul or stay. Suddenly, Norn attempts to go to Begaritt by herself when Rudeus won't, and then confronts him about the issue, and realizing that he is the only one strong enough to make the journey to Begaritt. Realizing she's right, Rudeus decides to leave to help Paul save Zenith.
43	19	"Desert Journey"; Transliteration: "Sabaku no Tabi" (Japanese: 砂漠の旅)	Tomoaki Takatsudo	Kōhei Urushibara	Hong Zhi Sun	May 27, 2024
Rudeus relays his decision to Elinalise, who agrees to accompany him to Begaritt even though a round trip to the continent takes 16 months at a minimum. Rudeus then informs Nanahoshi of his departure, and she discloses the location of a secret teleportation circle nearby that can instantly transport him to Begaritt and back, which would shorten the trip to just one month. Rudeus then lets his family know he is leaving, and despite Sylphie's reservations about the use of teleportation, Rudeus assures her he will be back before their child is born. Having finishing their preparations, Rudeus and Elinalise depart for Begaritt, with Cliff declaring his love for Elinalise and promising to marry her upon her return. The two use the teleportation circle to travel to a desert in Begaritt and keep traveling on foot. After defeating some monsters on the way, Rudeus and Elinalise arrive at the city of Rapan in order to rendezvous with Paul and the others.
44	20	"Into the Labyrinth"; Transliteration: "Meikyūiri" (Japanese: 迷宮入り)	Directed by : Hiroki Nagashima & Masami Kashimama; Storyboarded by : Ayumu Uwano	Atsushi Takayama	Kōta Sera	June 3, 2024
Rudeus and Elinalise quickly encounter Geese in Rapan, who agrees to take them to Paul. Paul is shocked that Rudeus and Elinalise made it to Rapan so quickly, and makes amends with Elinalise over an incident in their past. He then explains that Zenith went missing in a nearby, highly dangerous labyrinth. Despite numerous expeditions, Paul's party had been unable to locate her and Roxy had gone missing after accidentally triggering a teleportation trap. Upon learning the labyrinth is the infamous Teleporter Labyrinth, Rudeus shows a book he had borrowed from the university to study teleportation magic, which details a past exploration of the labyrinth. Geese confirms the information is real and can lead them to Zenith. Rudeus then spends the night catching up with Paul, telling him about his marriage with Sylphie and her pregnancy. The next day, Rudeus, Elinalise, Paul, Geese, and Talhand enter the Teleporter Labyrinth. With the information from the book, the party is able to quickly make their way to the third stratum. While there, Rudeus discovers signs of Roxy's presence and manages to save her from a horde of monsters.
45	21	"Magic Circles of the Sixth Stratum"; Transliteration: "Dai Roku Kaisō no Mahō-jin" (Japanese: 第六階層の魔法陣)	Directed by : Sayaka Tsuji & Ryōsuke Shibuya; Storyboarded by : Akira Nishimori & Yasuaki Fujii	Atsushi Takayama	Kōta Sera & Hong Zhi Sun	June 10, 2024
Rudeus is happy at reuniting with Roxy, but is disheartened when she initially doesn't recognize him due to the time they have spent apart. The party then returns to town to let Roxy rest for some days while preparing for their next expedition, with Rudeus and Roxy spending some time together, but Rudeus refrains from telling her about his marriage with Sylphie or his child. Roxy meanwhile appears to have fallen in love with Rudeus now, and has him promise to explore an easier labyrinth with her sometime in the future. After Roxy recovers, the party returns to the labyrinth and pushes all the way through the fifth stratum, down to the last room described in the book. As the party examines the room, Paul uses his two swords as an analogy to give Rudeus advice about having relationships with both Sylphie and Roxy, having recognized Roxy's crush on Rudeus. While figuring out how to proceed, Rudeus deduces that the room resembles those from the ruins he and Elinalise used to teleport to Begaritt and finds some secret stairs which allow them to move forward to the sixth stratum in their search for Zenith.
46	22	"Parents"; Transliteration: "Oya" (Japanese: 親)	Directed by : Q Kawa & Yasuhiko Akiyama; Storyboarded by : Hiroshi Shirai	Kōhei Urushibara	Shinobu Ikakko	June 17, 2024
Upon arriving in the sixth stratum, the party is shocked to see that the labyrinth's guardian is a hydra protecting a crystal with Zenith encased inside it. Paul goes into a berserk fury upon seeing Zenith and attacks the hydra, but it can repel magic and can instantly regenerate its heads no matter how many times Paul cuts them off. Seeing that their attacks have no effect, the party retreats back to the fifth stratum to regroup. Paul is initially angry at leaving behind Zenith again, but the party stresses that they need a plan. Roxy reveals that she read this particular hydra, a Manatite Hydra, can absorb mana so it can only be harmed by magic attacks at point blank range. Rudeus recalls the ancient Greek myths about the hydra and suggests they can counter its regeneration with fire. With a proper plan in place, the party attacks the hydra again and eventually able to kill it. However, in the course of the battle, Rudeus loses his left hand and Paul dies protecting Rudeus from one of the hydra's attacks. Disheartened at Paul's death, the party cremates his body and returns to town with an unconscious Zenith. Four days later, Zenith finally awakens from her coma, but Rudeus and Lilia are shocked to see that Zenith has apparently suffered brain damage.
47	23	"Let's Go Home"; Transliteration: "Kaerou" (Japanese: 帰ろう)	Directed by : Oreki Jōgorō; Storyboarded by : Tōru Harumizu	Kōhei Urushibara	Hong Zhi Sun	June 24, 2024
Devastated with Paul's death, Rudeus reminisces about his parents from his previous life and regrets not having paid his respects when they died. Roxy then comes to his room to comfort Rudeus and spends the night having sex with him. The next day, Lilia tells Rudeus that according to Elinalise, Zenith lost her memories and it is unlikely she will ever fully recover. Regardless, Lilia assures Rudeus that she will take care of Zenith in Paul's stead, so he should focus on his own family. The party departs from Rapan back to Sharia, taking Lilia and Zenith with them. During the journey, Rudeus confesses to Roxy that he is married and isn't sure if he reciprocates her feelings, but Roxy reveals that she was previously informed by Elinalise and admits that she fell in love with him when he rescued her in the labyrinth. However, not wanting to interfere in Rudeus's marriage with Sylphie, Roxy is willing to bury her own feelings and move on with her life. Realizing he actually does love Roxy as much as he loves Sylphie, Rudeus is divided between them and doesn't know what to do, until Elinalise persuades him to take Roxy as his second wife since Paul was able to maintain relations with both Zenith and Lilia. Rudeus asks Roxy to marry him, but she tells Rudeus that she will only answer him after he asks for Sylphie's permission first. As he watches the sun rise, Rudeus muses that he isn't all that different from Paul after all.
48	24	"Succession"; Transliteration: "Tsugu" (Japanese: 嗣ぐ)	Directed by : Tomoaki Takatsudo, Hiroki Nagashima & Ryōsuke Shibuya; Storyboarded by : Mie Ōishi	Naoto Taniuchi	Kōta Sera & Hong Zhi Sun	July 1, 2024
Rudeus finally returns home and, worried about the Man-God's words, looks for Sylphie and the others, getting relieved upon confirming that they are safe. Once Norn returns home, Rudeus talks to the rest of the family about Paul's death and welcomes Lilia and Zenith to live with them. Rudeus reveals to Sylphie his relationship with Roxy and asks for Sylphie's permission to marry her too. Norn reprimands Rudeus for being unfaithful to his wife, but Sylphie, recognizing Rudeus's longtime admiration for Roxy, accepts his request and welcomes her as his second wife, reminding Norn that she accepted Paul having two wives as well. Roxy decides to not marry Rudeus until the birth of Sylphie's child. One month later, Sylphie gives birth to Rudeus's daughter, Lucy Greyrat. After marrying Roxy, Rudeus pays a visit to Paul's grave and thanks his father for everything he has done for him, promising to watch over the Greyrat family in his stead and determined to fulfill his vow of living a life with no regrets.

== Home media release ==
=== Japanese ===
Toho Animation (Japan – Region 2/A)
Chapter	Episodes	Artwork	Release date	Ref.
1	0–5	Rudeus and Eris Boreas Greyrat	October 18, 2023	
2	6–12	Fitz (Sylphiette), Luke Notos Greyrat and Ariel Anemoi Asura	December 20, 2023	
3	13–18	Rudeus, Norn and Aisha Greyrat	July 17, 2024	
4	19–24	Roxy Migurdia, Paul and Rudeus Greyrat	September 18, 2024	
