= The Rising of the Shield Hero season 4 =

The Rising of the Shield Hero
- Season 4
- Key visual for the fourth season
- No. of episodes: 12

Release
- Original network: AT-X
- Original release: July 9 – September 24, 2025

Season chronology
- ← Previous; Season 3

The Rising of the Shield Hero is an anime television series based on the light novel series of the same name written by Aneko Yusagi. In January 2024, it was announced that a fourth season was in production, which aired from July 9 to September 24, 2025., adapting volumes 13 to 14 of the light novel series. Hitoshi Haga reprises his role as series director. The series composition is handled by Keigo Koyanagi, character design and chief animation direction by Franziska van Wulfen, Sana Komatsu and Masahiro Suwa, and soundtrack by Kevin Penkin, Alfredo Sirica and Natalie Jeffreys. Crunchyroll is streaming the English dub simultaneously as the season airs.

The opening theme song is "Resolution", performed by Madkid, while the ending theme song is "Eien ni Ikkai no" (永遠に一回の, lit. 'Once in a Lifetime'), performed by Chiai Fujikawa.

== Episodes ==
No. overall	No. in season	Title	Directed by	Written by	Chief animation directed by	Original release date
51	1	"Siltvelt"; Transliteration: "Shirutoveruto" (Japanese: シルトヴェルト)	Takanori Yamamoto	Keigo Koyanagi	Franziska van Wulfen	July 9, 2025
52	2	"Official Welcome"; Transliteration: "Kantai" (Japanese: 歓待)	Wataru Arakawa	Mika Tanaka	Franziska van Wulfen & Masahiro Suwa	July 16, 2025
53	3	"A True People"; Transliteration: "Shinnaru Min to wa" (Japanese: 真なる民とは)	Directed by : Wataru Arakawa & Motohiko Niwa; Storyboarded by : Takanori Yamamoto	Akiko Waba	Franziska van Wulfen & Masahiro Suwa	July 23, 2025
54	4	"Entrusted Power"; Transliteration: "Takusa-reta Chikara" (Japanese: 託された力)	Directed by : Hitoshi Haga, Xingwen Yao & Hiroki Yamamoto; Storyboarded by : Huang Jiawen	Ohine Ezaki	Sana Komatsu, Masahiro Suwa & Franziska van Wulfen	July 30, 2025
55	5	"White Tiger"; Transliteration: "Hakuko" (Japanese: 白虎(ハクコ))	Directed by : Motohiko Niwa; Storyboarded by : Daiki Yonemori & Shingo Kaneko	Keigo Koyanagi	Sana Komatsu & Franziska van Wulfen	August 6, 2025
56	6	"Leaving Port"; Transliteration: "Shukkō" (Japanese: 出港)	Wataru Arakawa	Satoshi Ōshio	Sana Komatsu & Masahiro Suwa	August 13, 2025
57	7	"Arriving in Q'ten Lo"; Transliteration: "Ku'ten Rou Jōriku" (Japanese: クテンロウ上陸)	Takanori Yamamoto	Satoshi Ōshio	Franziska van Wulfen	August 20, 2025
58	8	"Orochi" (Japanese: 大蛇)	Directed by : Kazuho Kunimoto, Takehiro Kubota, Masahiro Suwa & Hitoshi Haga; Storyboarded by : Tetsuro Tanaka & Hidetoshi Namura	Keigo Koyanagi	Sana Komatsu & Masahiro Suwa	August 27, 2025
59	9	"Zodia" (Japanese: ゾディア)	Directed by : Hitoshi Haga & Haruka Watanabe; Storyboarded by : Hitoshi Haga	Mika Tanaka	Franziska van Wulfen	September 3, 2025
60	10	"Prayer"; Transliteration: "Inori" (Japanese: 祈り)	Directed by : Se-Ting Liang; Storyboarded by : Yusuke Kubo	Yoshikazu Tominaga	Sana Komatsu, Masahiro Suwa & Kōta Sera	September 10, 2025
61	11	"Oracle Miko"; Transliteration: "Shintaku no Miko" (Japanese: 神託の巫女)	Directed by : Xiaoyue Zhu; Storyboarded by : Hidetoshi Namura & Toshihiko Masuda	Ohine Ezaki	Masahiro Suwa & Sana Komatsu	September 17, 2025
62	12	"Return of the Emperor"; Transliteration: "Tenmei no Kikan" (Japanese: 天命の帰還)	Takanori Yamamoto	Keigo Koyanagi	Sana Komatsu, Franziska van Wulfen & Masahiro Suwa	September 24, 2025

== Home media release ==
=== Japanese ===
Kadokawa Corporation (Japan – Region 2/A)
Vol.	Episodes	Release date	Ref.
1	1–4	October 29, 2025	
2	5–8	November 26, 2025	
3	9–12	December 24, 2025	
