= Alfredo Sirica =

Italian film composer

Background information
- Born: 25 April 1999 (age 27); Rome, Italy
- Genre: Soundtrack (Film score)
- Occupations: Composer, pianist, orchestrator

Alfredo Sirica (born 25 April 1999) is an Italian composer, pianist and orchestrator.

Best known for his activity as soundtrack composer, he has written and produced music for cinema, video games and TV series. With his work for the Italian animated series Lampadino e Caramella nel MagiRegno degli Zampa, produced by Rai Ragazzi, he became the first composer of a soundtrack suitable also for children with disabilities such as blindness or autism, merging narration with music therapy. With the third season of The Rising of the Shield Hero, he also became the first Italian musician to work with Kadokawa as music composer for an anime.

== Career ==
He writes his first soundtrack at the age of sixteen for the feature film Porches and Private Eyes, after winning an online competition promoted by Running Wild Films.

In 2017, he is chosen by HeR Interactive and Eric Lindstrom, screenwriter for Tomb Raider, to write the soundtrack for the videogame Odyssey – The Story of Science, promoted by the scientific communicator Vsauce and currently in use in several institutes for educational purposes. During the same year, he worked on the short film Pawns by David Barbeschi, which soon becomes viral, reaching over 2 million views on YouTube and becoming part of the MUBI catalogue.

In 2018, for the feature film Sincerely, Brenda, he gets nominated for "Best Original Soundtrack" at the Detroit Filmmaker Awards. In the same year, for the Vatican Foundation, he creates the music for the animated film Bernadette. This project marks the beginning of his collaboration with the animation studio Animundi.

In 2019, together with voice actor Laura Bailey and the New York School of Visual Arts, he works on the animated short A Moonlight's Tale. The project gains immediate universal acclaim by critics and public alike, reaching over 12 million views on the web.

His collaboration with the Italian animation studio Animundi resumes. With a financial contribution from the Ministry of Cultural Heritage and Activities (Italy) and Rai Ragazzi, production for the animated series Lampadino e Caramella nel MagiRegno degli Zampa starts. It is the first TV product accessible by all children, including those affected by disabilities. The cartoon aired on 29 March 2020 on the national channel Rai Yoyo, soon becoming the most popular program watched by Italian children in the preschool age. For his work, he gets invited as a guest at the Giffoni Film Festival and several Italian television programs. At the 24th edition of the Cartoons on the Bay, the series receives the UNICEF award for "best animated series".

In 2020, with the work-in-progress animated film Bigger than Us, he wins the "Studio Alhambra Prize" at the Annecy International Animated Film Festival MIFA Pitch, obtaining significant funding for his latest soundtrack. He also writes the music for the feature film Time for Love, directed by Miguel J. Veléz, officially selected at the Cannes Film Festival Marché du Film, as well as the Austin Film Festival and the RIFF.

In 2021, he writes the soundtrack for the second season of the Italian TV series Lampadino e Caramella. In February 2022, he promotes the new episodes on the TV show I Soliti Ignoti.

In 2023, with The Rising of the Shield Hero, he becomes the first Italian musician to work with Kadokawa as music composer for an anime.

In March 2024, he completes his master's degree in Music Composition for Media at the Conservatorio Santa Cecilia in Rome. In May, the announcement trailer for the Japanese anime series "Goodbye, Lara" is released. Alfredo Sirica composes the music, performed by the Budapest Scoring Orchestra. On October 6, he also participates as a guest at the Romics convention, to talk about his soundtrack for "Lampadino e Caramella", following the release of its third season.

On March 26, 2025, Nippon Columbia publishes the soundtrack album for the third season of The Rising of the Shield Hero, with five new tracks by Alfredo Sirica. On April 21, 2025, the first trailer for the fourth season of The Rising of the Shield Hero is released. Alfredo Sirica, Kevin Penkin and Natalie Jeffreys are announced as music composers.

For the Dutch documentary "The Gold of the Sun" ("Het Goed van de Zon"), for which he composes the soundtrack, he writes two music pieces for the bell tower of St. Martin's Cathedral in Utrecht, the Domtoren, performed by Malgosia Fiebig, the official city carilloneur. The main musical theme of the film also turns into a music box crafted by the artisan Rob de Looff, from Robin Wood Music Boxes. The story is documented on national TV, within the Italian TV show TG2 Storie.

== Partial filmography ==
=== Feature films ===
- Porches and Private Eyes, directed by Travis Mills (2016)
- Sincerely, Brenda, directed by Kenneth Nelson Jr. (2018)
- Time for Love, directed by Miguel J. Veléz (2020)

=== Short films ===
- Pawns, directed by Tyrees A. Lamptey (2017)
- A Moonlight's Tale, directed by Aarif Attarwala (2019)
- Hush, directed by Tyler Chipman (2019)
- The Shade, directed by Tyler Chipman (2019)

=== Documentaries ===
- The Gold of the Sun (Het Goud van de Zon), directed by Vincent van Esch (2025)

=== TV shows ===
- Lampadino e Caramella nel MagiRegno degli Zampa, directed by Raffaele Bortone (2020)
- Lampadino e Caramella nel MagiRegno degli Zampa 2, directed by Raffaele Bortone and Andrea Martini (2022)
- The Rising of the Shield Hero 3 (with Kevin Penkin and Natalie Jeffreys), directed by Hitoshi Haga (2023)
- Lampadino e Caramella nel MagiRegno degli Zampa 3, directed by Raffaele Bortone and Andrea Martini (2024)
- The Rising of the Shield Hero 4 (with Kevin Penkin and Natalie Jeffreys), directed by Hitoshi Haga (2025)
- Made in Abyss: Princess's Diary (2026)
- Lampadino e Caramella nel MagiRegno degli Zampa 5, directed by Raffaele Bortone and Andrea Martini (2026)
- The Rising of the Shield Hero 5 (with Kevin Penkin and Natalie Jeffreys), directed by Hitoshi Haga (2027)
- The Triplets, directed by Javier Galan (2027)

=== Videogames ===
- Warhammer 40,000: Regicide (translator)
- Demetrios – The Big Cynical Adventure
- Odyssey – The Story of Science
- Everdate – Let's Play: The Dating Game (2026)
- Asteria: Fate of the Fallen (2027)

== Awards and acknowledgements ==
Annecy International Animation Film Festival

- MIFA Pitch 2020 – Studios Alhambra Award for Bigger Than Us

Cartoons on the Bay

- UNICEF Award 2020 – Award for Lampadino e Caramella nel MagiRegno degli Zampa

Austin Filmmaker Awards

- Best soundtrack for a feature film – Nomination for Sincerely, Brenda

Castle Film & Media Awards

- Best soundtrack award for The Gold of the Sun

Veneto International Film Festival

- Best soundtrack – Nomination for The Gold of the Sun

International sound & film music festival

- Best soundtrack for a documentary – Nomination for The Gold of the Sun
