= List of The Rising of the Shield Hero volumes =

The Rising of the Shield Hero is a Japanese light novel series written by Aneko Yusagi. Originally published as a web novel, the series has since been published by Media Factory with an expanded story-line featuring illustrations by Seira Minami. As of June 25, 2019, twenty-two volumes have been published. The novel series was adapted into a manga series by Aiya Kyū and published by Media Factory, with thirty volumes released as of May 22, 2026. Both the novel and manga series were licensed by One Peace Books and were published in North America starting with the first volume on September 15, 2015. One Peace Books licensed the spin-off novel The Reprise of the Spear Hero.

== Light novel ==
=== The Rising of the Shield Hero ===
No.	Original release date	Original ISBN	English release date	English ISBN
1	August 22, 2013	978-4-8401-5275-4	September 15, 2015	978-1-935548-72-0
Chapter One: "A Royal Summons"; Chapter Two: "The Heroes"; Chapter Three: "A Heroic Discussion"; Chapter Four: "Specially-Arranged Funding"; Chapter Five: "The Reality of the Shield"; Chapter Six: "A Backstabber Named Landmine"; Chapter Seven: "False Charges"; Chapter Eight: "Ruined Reputation"; Chapter Nine: "They Call it a Slave"; Chapter Ten: "Kids' Menu"; Chapter Eleven: "The Fruits of Slavery"; Chapter Twelve: "What's Yours is Mine"; Chapter Thirteen: "Medicine"; Chapter Fourteen: "To Take a Life"; Chapter Fifteen: "Demi-Humans"; Chapter Sixteen: "The Two-Headed, Black Dog"; Chapter Seventeen: "Preparing for the Wave"; Chapter Eighteen: "Barbarian Armor"; Chapter Nineteen: "The Dragon Hourglass"; Chapter Twenty: "The Sword"; Chapter Twenty-One: "The Wave of Destruction"; Chapter Twenty-Two: "The Clash of Spear and Shield"; Chapter Twenty-Three: "All I'd Wanted To Hear"; Epilogue; Special Extra Chapter One: "The Spear Hero's Buffoonery"; Special Extra Chapter Two: "The Flag on the Kid's Meal"
2	October 1, 2013	978-4-04-066049-3	October 20, 2015	978-1-935548-78-2
Prologue: "Shared Pain"; Chapter One: "Egg Machine"; Chapter Two: "Gratitude for Life"; Chapter Three: "Filo"; Chapter Four: "Growth"; Chapter Five: "Kick and Run"; Chapter Six: "Wings"; Chapter Seven: "Transformation"; Chapter Eight: "Carrot and Stick"; Chapter Nine: "Rewards"; Chapter Ten: "Traveling Merchant"; Chapter Eleven: "Travel by Carriage"; Chapter Twelve: "Rumors of the Heroes"; Chapter Thirteen: "Take Everything but Life"; Chapter Fourteen: "Magic Practice"; Chapter Fifteen: "Why it Was Sealed"; Chapter Sixteen: "Invading Vines"; Chapter Seventeen: "Improving the Product Line"; Chapter Eighteen: "Diseased Village"; Chapter Nineteen: "Curse Series"; Chapter Twenty: "The Shield of Rage"; Epilogue: "As a Shield..."; Special Extra Chapter: "Presents"
3	December 21, 2013	978-4-04-066166-7	February 16, 2016	978-1-935548-66-9
Prologue; Chapter One: "Filo's Friend"; Chapter Two: "The Fruits of Peddling"; Chapter Three: "Everyone Loves Angels"; Chapter Four: "The Volunteer"; Chapter Five: "A Royal Order"; Chapter Six: "Welcome"; Chapter Seven: "General Commander"; Chapter Eight: "Before the Storm"; Chapter Nine: "Framed Again?"; Chapter Ten: "The Third Wave"; Chapter Eleven: "Grow Up"; Chapter Twelve: "Iron Maiden"; Chapter Thirteen: "Parting Ways"; Chapter Fourteen: "On the Road Again"; Chapter Fifteen: "The Shield Demon"; Chapter Sixteen: "Appointment Arrangements"; Chapter Seventeen: "The Princess's True Strength"; Chapter Eighteen: "Persuasion"; Chapter Nineteen: "The Tools"; Chapter Twenty: "Shadow"; Epilogue: "Name"; Extra Chapter: "Before I Met My Best Friend"
4	February 25, 2014	978-4-04-066321-0	June 14, 2016	978-1-935548-65-2
Prologue: "On The Run"; Chapter One: "Demi-Human Adventurer Town"; Chapter Two: "Noblemen"; Chapter Three: "Tyrant Dragon Rex"; Chapter Four: "The Legendary Bird God"; Chapter Five: "Filo vs Fitoria"; Chapter Six: "The Bird God's Peace"; Chapter Seven: "The Battle of Shield and Spear"; Chapter Eight: "Judgment"; Chapter Nine: "Replica"; Chapter Ten: "Shield of Wrath"; Chapter Eleven: "The Queen"; Chapter Twelve: "Paying the Piper"; Epilogue: "Friends Forever"; Extra Bonus Chapter: "The Fearful Filolial"
5	April 25, 2014	978-4-04-066718-8	August 23, 2016	978-1-935548-67-6
Prologue: "Class Up"; Chapter One: "The Heroes' Teammates"; Chapter Two: "Meeting of the Heroes"; Chapter Three: "Power Up"; Chapter Four: "Weapon Copy"; Chapter Five: "Gravestones"; Chapter Six: "Cal Mira"; Chapter Seven: "The Tavern"; Chapter Eight: "Karma"; Chapter Nine: "Island Days"; Chapter Ten: "The Water Temple"; Chapter Eleven: "Inter-dimensional Whale"; Chapter Twelve: "L'Arc Berg"; Chapter Thirteen: "Soul-Healing Water"; Epilogue: "The Problem We Face"; Extra Chapter: "The Cal Mira Hot Springs"
6	June 25, 2014	978-4-04-066790-4	November 22, 2016	978-1-935548-56-0
Prologue: "Cal Mira Superstitions"; Chapter One: "The Seven Star Heroes"; Chapter Two: "An Unhappy Girl"; Chapter Three: "Framed Again"; Chapter Four: "Custom Order"; Chapter Five: "Battle Advisors"; Chapter Six: "Hengen Muso Style"; Chapter Seven: "Impossible Training?"; Chapter Eight: "Life-Force Water"; Chapter Nine: "What it Means to Train"; Chapter Ten: "Kigurumi"; Chapter Eleven: "——'s Familiar"; Chapter Twelve: "Getting Ahead of the Enemy"; Chapter Thirteen: "Game Knowledge Bares its Fangs"; Chapter Fourteen: "What it Means to be a Hero"; Chapter Fifteen: "The Spirit Tortoise"; Chapter Sixteen: "The Country Above the Spirit Tortoise"; Epilogue: "A Disquieting Place"; Extra Chapter: "Trials and Tribulations of the Bow Hero"
7	September 25, 2014	978-4-04-066996-0	April 18, 2017	978-1-944937-08-9
Prologue: "The Search"; Chapter One: "Helping Others"; Chapter Two: "Spirit Tortoise Familiar (Human Type)"; Chapter Three: "The Spirit Tortoise Reawakens"; Chapter Four: "Spirit Tortoise Tyrant"; Chapter Five: "Mass Destruction"; Chapter Six: "Versus the Spirit Tortoise, Opening Stages"; Chapter Seven: "Buying Time"; Chapter Eight: "The Search"; Chapter Nine: "The Spirit Tortoise Cave"; Chapter Ten: "Strangers"; Chapter Eleven: "The Heroes' Inscription"; Chapter Twelve: "The Spirit Tortoise's Heart"; Chapter Thirteen: "Who Pulls the Strings"; Chapter Fourteen: "Liberation"; Chapter Fifteen: "The Spirit Tortoise's Soul"; Epilogue: "Ost Horai"; Extra Chapter: "Searching for the Soul-Healing Water"
8	November 21, 2014	978-4-04-067180-2	June 13, 2017	978-1-944937-09-6
Prologue: "The Never-Ending Labyrinth"; Chapter One: "The Hunting Hero"; Chapter Two: "Escape"; Chapter Three: "The Unknown World"; Chapter Four: "Selling Drop Items"; Chapter Five: "Sales Demonstration"; Chapter Six: "Otherworldly Equipment"; Chapter Seven: "The Legend of the Waves"; Chapter Eight: "On the Way to the Hunting Hero's House"; Chapter Nine: "Shikigami"; Chapter Ten: "The Katana of the Vassal Weapons: Chapter Eleven: "Rescuing the Angel"; Chapter Twelve: "Humming Fairy"; Chapter Thirteen: "The Hunting Hero's Skills"; Chapter Fourteen: "Return Dragon Vien"; Chapter Fifteen: "The Katana's Choice"; Chapter Sixteen: "No Incantations"; Chapter Seventeen: "Blood Flower Strike"; Epilogue: "Together Again"
9	January 23, 2015	978-4-04-067355-4	November 15, 2017	978-1-944937-25-6
Prologue: "The Waves of Another World"; Chapter One: "Otherworldly Techniques"; Chapter Two: "Quick Draw"; Chapter Three: "Lure"; Chapter Four: "Like a Charging Wild Boar"; Chapter Five: Together, With Conditions"; Chapter Six: "The Reformed"; Chapter Seven: "Barbaroi Armor"; Chapter Eight: "Two Swords"; Chapter Nine: "Kyo's Laboratory"; Chapter Ten: "When Trust is Lost"; Chapter Eleven: "Sacrifice Aura"; Chapter Twelve: "A Heavy Price to Pay"; Epilogue: "Kizuna Between Worlds"
10	March 25, 2015	978-4-04-067485-8	March 20, 2018	978-1-944937-26-3
Prologue: "The Spirit Tortoise's Barrier"; Chapter One: "The Seven Star Staff Hero"; Chapter Two: "Whereabouts of the Slaves"; Chapter Three: "Acquaintances"; Chapter Four: "E Float Shield"; Chapter Five: "The Seaetto Territory"; Chapter Six: "Feeding the Herd"; Chapter Seven: "Employing the Bioplant"; Chapter Eight: "Children of the Sea"; Chapter Nine: "Hanging Out the Shield"; Chapter Ten: "Zeltoble"; Chapter Eleven: "Slave Hunters"; Chapter Twelve: "The Department Store"; Chapter Thirteen: "The Underground Coliseum"; Chapter Fourteen: "Ring Name"; Chapter Fifteen: "Surprise Attacks and Conspiracies"; Chapter Sixteen: "Nadia"; Chapter Seventeen: "Farce"; Chapter Eighteen: "Exhibition Match"; Chapter Nineteen: "Big Shots of the Underground"; Epilogue: "Come-On"
11	June 25, 2015	978-4-04-067698-2	June 12, 2018	978-1-944937-46-1
Prologue: "To Market"; Chapter One: "Sacred Tree Elixir"; Chapter Two: "Return of the Village"; Chapter Three: "Alps"; Chapter Four: "A Shield to Protect the Shield"; Chapter Five: "Trash and the Hakuko"; Chapter Six: "The Fruits of Training"; Chapter Seven: "The Plan to Capture the Spear Hero"; Chapter Eight: "The Day the Game Ended"; Chapter Nine: "I Dub Thee Witch"; Chapter Ten: "New Awakening"; Chapter Eleven: "Loincloth Pup"; Chapter Twelve: "The Decision"; Chapter Thirteen: "Oodles of Ambushes"; Chapter Fourteen: "Official Request"; Chapter Fifteen: "The Masked Man"; Chapter Sixteen: "The Merits of Invading Other Worlds"; Chapter Seventeen: "Temptation"; Chapter Eighteen: "Flash"; Epilogue: "Making Peace with the Sword Hero"
12	September 25, 2015	978-4-04-067787-3	August 18, 2018	978-1-944937-95-9
Prologue: "The Shield Hero's Morning"; Chapter One: "Instant Awakening"; Chapter Two: "The Alchemist"; Chapter Three: "Filolials and Dragons"; Chapter Four: "Stardust Blade"; Chapter Five: "Knock and Run"; Chapter Six: "Level Drain"; Chapter Seven: "Plagued Earth"; Chapter Eight: "Demon Dragon"; Chapter Nine: "Forced Power-Up"; Chapter Ten: "Purification"; Chapter Eleven: "Perfect Hidden Justice"; Chapter Twelve: "Justice vs. Justice"; Chapter Thirteen: "Atonement"; Chapter Fourteen: "Secret Base"; Chapter Fifteen: "Form is Emptiness"
13	November 25, 2015	978-4-04-067965-5	December 18, 2018	978-1-944937-96-6
Prologue: "Team Assignments"; Chapter One: "Advance Payment"; Chapter Two: "Sending Word of Our Visit"; Chapter Three: "Arrival in Siltvelt"; Chapter Four: "Shield of the Beast King"; Chapter Five: "Harem"; Chapter Six: "Conspiracy"; Chapter Seven: "A True Siltveltian"; Chapter Eight: "Honor in Battle"; Chapter Nine: "Beast Transformation"; Chapter Ten: "Assigning the Heroes"; Chapter Eleven: "The Flawed Master"; Chapter Twelve: "A Little Help from the Water Dragon"; Chapter Thirteen: "Q'ten Lo Revolutionaries"; Chapter Fourteen: "Sakura Stone of Destiny"; Chapter Fifteen: "Sakura Stone of Influence"; Epilogue: "The Old Guy's Master"
14	February 25, 2016	978-4-04-068121-4	October 15, 2019	978-1-64273-018-0
Prologue: "Planning the Q'Ten Lo Invasion"; Chapter One: "The Sealed Orochi"; Chapter Two: "Sharing Power-Ups"; Chapter Three: "The Cursed Ama-no-Murakumo Sword"; Chapter Four: "Tailwind"; Chapter Five: "Information on the Enemy"; Chapter Six: "Use of Life Force"; Chapter Seven: "A Terrible Sense of Direction"; Chapter Eight: "Big Sister"; Chapter Nine: "The Miko Priestess of Carnage"; Chapter Ten: "Shield Power-Up Method"; Chapter Eleven: "A Brief Return Trip"; Chapter Twelve: "Past and Present"; Chapter Thirteen: "The Past Heavenly Emperor"; Chapter Fourteen: "The True Terror of Monsters"; Epilogue: "Dusk"
15	September 23, 2016	978-4-04-068638-7	December 15, 2019	978-1-64273-019-7
Prologue: "A Problem with Bandits"; Chapter One: "Birth of the Raph Species"; Chapter Two: "Territory Reform"; Chapter Three: "Spirit Tortoise Shell"; Chapter Four: "Fitoria's Request"; Chapter Five: "The Street Racer"; Chapter Six: "The Love Hunter"; Chapter Seven: "Filolial Terror"; Chapter Eight: "The Third Hero Conference"; Chapter Nine: "Siblings' Squabble"; Chapter Ten: "Home of the Phoenix"; Chapter Eleven: "The Lost Hero's Diary"; Chapter Twelve: "The Final Seven Star Weapon"; Chapter Thirteen: "The Night Before the Phoenix Battle"; Chapter Fourteen: "Fighting the Phoenix"; Chapter Fifteen: "A Forbidden Flicker"; Epilogue: "The Girl Who Became a Shield"
16	January 25, 2017	978-4-04-069051-3	March 15, 2020	978-1-64273-020-3
Prologue: "The Funeral"; Chapter One: "The Ocean Floor"; Chapter Two: "The Festival"; Chapter Three: "The Genius"; Chapter Four: "Stolen Power"; Chapter Five: "The Spirits"; Chapter Six: "The Staff Hero"; Chapter Seven: "The Wisest King of Wisdom"; Chapter Eight: "X"; Chapter Nine: "Fenrir Force"; Chapter Ten: "Two Regular Guys and the Strongest Seven Star Hero"; Chapter Eleven: "The Shield Hero Now Orders You"; Chapter Twelve: "The Execution"; Epilogue: "Vanguard of the Waves"
17	March 25, 2017	978-4-04-069190-9	July 14, 2020	978-1-64273-053-1
Prologue: "The Coronation"; Chapter One: "Talk of Love"; Chapter Two: "Limit break"; Chapter Three: "Party Selection"; Chapter Four: "Arrival into Conflict"; Chapter Five: "Inter-World Adaptation"; Chapter Six: "Hidden Abilities"; Chapter Seven: "Finding Kizuna"; Chapter Eight: "Subterranean Maze City"; Chapter Nine: "Outsider Theory"; Chapter Ten: "A Familiar Face"; Chapter Eleven: "The Mirror Vassal Weapon"; Chapter Twelve: "A Falling Out"; Chapter Thirteen: "Forced Possession"; Chapter Fourteen: "Quick Adaptation"; Chapter Fifteen: "Mirror"; Epilogue: "A Responsibility to Justice"
18	July 25, 2017	978-4-04-069354-5	November 12, 2020	978-1-64273-082-1
Prologue: "The Meeting to Discuss Efficient Eating Enhancement"; Chapter One: "Sloth"; Chapter Two: "Library Search"; Chapter Three: "Fishing Fool's Determination"; Chapter Four: "Sisters and Jealousy"; Chapter Five: "Ultimate Soup Stock"; Chapter Six: "Seya's Restaurant"; Chapter Seven: "Contentious Cooking Battle"; Chapter Eight: "Medicinal Cooking"; Chapter Nine: "Resolution via Violence"; Chapter Ten: "Dragon of Ultimate Magic"; Chapter Eleven: "Volunteer Soldiers"; Chapter Twelve: "Double Reflection"; Chapter Thirteen: "The Reborn"; Epilogue: "The Game Knowledge Pitfall"
19	January 25, 2018	978-4-04-069665-2	April 27, 2021	978-1-64273-104-0
Prologue: "An Exchange of Otherworldly Information"; Chapter One: "A Visit to the Head Temple"; Chapter Two: "Holy Tool Grotto"; Chapter Three: "The Work of Men and Monsters"; Chapter Four: "A Visit to Demon Dragon Castle"; Chapter Five: "Appraisal Camouflage"; Chapter Six: "A New Heavenly King"; Chapter Seven: "The Demon Dragon's Treasure"; Chapter Eight: "An Alluring Pudding"; Chapter Nine: "Just to Make Sure"; Chapter Ten: "The importance of Anger"; Chapter Eleven: "Opposing Nullification"; Chapter Twelve: "Intelligence Operative"; Chapter Thirteen: "Insensitive Individuals"; Chapter Fourteen: "Megido Iron Maiden"; Chapter Fifteen: "Defense of the Port"; Epilogue: "A Visitor Late at Night"
20	December 25, 2018	978-4-04-065134-7	June 22, 2021	978-1-64273-105-7
Prologue: "Believing Sloth Will Save the World"; Chapter One: "Prisoner Transport"; Chapter Two: "Training for an Obstinate Man"; Chapter Three: "The Sword Hero’s Sense of Responsibility"; Chapter Four: "The Filolial Ruins"; Chapter Five: "Village Abnormality"; Chapter Six: "Encounter with Extinct Monsters"; Chapter Seven: "Double the Shield Heroes"; Chapter Eight: "Hero Worship"; Chapter Nine: "Ancient Siltran"; Chapter Ten: "The Evil Researcher"; Chapter Eleven: "Bread Trees and Bread Troubles"; Chapter Twelve: "A Determination to War"; Chapter Thirteen: "Online Trolling"; Epilogue: "Different Constellations"
21	February 25, 2019	978-4-04-065546-8	October 26, 2021	978-1-64273-132-3
Prologue: "Use of Floating Weapons"; Chapter One: "The Siltran Situation"; Chapter Two: "Wagon Travel with Keel and the Gang"; Chapter Three: "Wave Trauma"; Chapter Four: "Thanks to the Assassin"; Chapter Five: "Genetic Modification"; Chapter Six: "Mikey"; Chapter Seven: "The Raph Species Upgrade Plan"; Chapter Eight: "The Troubles of the Shield Hero"; Chapter Nine: "Confusion Target"; Chapter Ten: "Filolia"; Chapter Eleven: "The Imitations (Improved)"; Chapter Twelve: "The Origin of the Waves"; Chapter Thirteen: "How to Kill a God"; Epilogue: "The Fear of Those Who are Eternal"
22	June 25, 2019	978-4-04-065839-1	December 21, 2021	978-1-64273-133-0
Prologue: "The Reticent Blacksmith"; Chapter One: "The Progenitor"; Chapter Two: "Claws and Hammer Power Up Method"; Chapter Three: "Holn's Research Weapon"; Chapter Four: "Quality Check of Heroes"; Chapter Five: "Gathering the Power of the Raph Species"; Chapter Six: "Selecting the Hammer Hero"; Chapter Seven: "Origin of the Past Heavenly Emperor"; Chapter Eight: "0 Territory"; Chapter Nine: "Heroic Presence"; Chapter Ten: "Exclusive Equipment"; Chapter Eleven: "Dinosaur Hunting"; Chapter Twelve: "Unexpected Visitors from Piensa"; Chapter Thirteen: "Beast Transformation of Rage"; Chapter Fourteen: "Known Vassal Weapon Heroes"; Chapter Fifteen: "In the Sanctuary"; Epilogue: "Dragon Slayer"

=== Limited Edition The Rising of the Shield Hero Season 1 Light Novel ===
Originally released as 4 separate volumes with the Japanese Special Editions of the Season 1 anime.

No.	Original release date	Original ISBN	English release date	English ISBN
	April 24, 2019; May 24, 2019; June 26, 2019; July 24, 2019	—	May 26, 2020	—
Raphtalia's Stay in Lute Village; Filo's Gourmet Trading Journey; Melty's Survival Dinner; Naofumi's Cal Mira Sightseeing

=== The Reprise of the Spear Hero ===
No.	Original release date	Original ISBN	English release date	English ISBN
1	September 25, 2017	978-4-04-069502-0	October 16, 2018	978-1-64273-003-6
Prologue: "Before Traveling to Another World"; Chapter One: "The Reprise of the Spear Hero"; Chapter Two: "Repaying Kindness"; Chapter Three: "Leveling"; Chapter Four: "Time Reversal"; Chapter Five: "Trap"; Chapter Six: "Dungeon"; Chapter Seven: "Gerontocracy"; Chapter Eight: "Aiming"; Chapter Nine: "Filolial Farmer"; Chapter Ten: "Hallucinations"; Chapter Eleven: "Camping Out"; Chapter Twelve: "Finesse"; Chapter Thirteen: "Peeping"; Chapter Fourteen: "Fitoria-Tan"; Chapter Fifteen: "Church of the Faux Heroes"; Epilogue: "Arrival at Siltvelt"
2	November 25, 2017	978-4-04-069588-4	September 29, 2020	978-1-64273-083-8
Prologue: "The Heroes' Arrival"; Chapter One: "Soulmate"; Chapter Two: "Poison"; Chapter Three: "Beast Spy"; Chapter Four: "In the Back Alley"; Chapter Five: "Shieldfreeden"; Chapter Six: "The Seven Star Whip Hero"; Chapter Seven: "Half-Burnt Charcoal"; Chapter Eight: "Remnants"; Chapter Nine: "Lingering Frangrance"; Chapter Ten: "Carved into the Heart"; Chapter Eleven: "A Guarantee of Safety"; Chapter Twelve: "Assassination"; Chapter Thirteen: "False Proof"; Chapter Fourteen: "Avoiding War"; Chapter Fifteen: "A Better World"; Chapter Sixteen: "Bluff"; Chapter Seventeen: "An Order"; Chapter Eighteen: "A Peddling Permit"; Epilogue: "Peddling Preparations"
3	July 25, 2018	978-4-04-069805-2	March 26, 2021	978-1-64273-106-4
Prologue: "Peak Racing"; Chapter One: "Carriage-Crafting"; Chapter Two: "A Lazy Pig"; Chapter Three: "A Hidden Passage"; Chapter Four: "Experts Know Best"; Chapter Five: "An Underestimation"; Chapter Six: "Emergency Exit"; Chapter Seven: "Rebirth of the Paradox"; Chapter Eight: "Bad Status"; Chapter Nine: "Unfair"; Chapter Ten: "The Egg Raffle"; Chapter Eleven: "Dressing Up the Panda"; Chapter Twelve: "The Fruit of Idleness"; Chapter Thirteen: "Tourist Attractions"; Chapter Fourteen: "The Assistant and the Dragon Girl"; Epilogue: "To Filolials, I Sound My Cry of Passion"
4	September 25, 2023	978-4-04-682894-1	—	—
5	December 25, 2024	978-4-04-684335-7	—	—

== Manga ==
=== The Rising of the Shield Hero ===
No.	Original release date	Original ISBN	English release date	English ISBN
1	June 23, 2014	978-4-04-066593-1	November 17, 2015	978-1-935548-70-6
1. "A Royal Summons" (王道的召喚, Ōdō-teki Shōkan); 2. "Framed" (冤罪, Enzai); 3. "Kid's Meal" (お子様ランチ, Okosama Ranchi); 4. "The Two-Headed Black Dog" (双頭黒犬, Sōtō Kokken); Chapter 4.5: "The Three Heroes" (三人の勇者達, San'nin no Yūsha-tachi)
2	October 23, 2014	978-4-04-066883-3	April 19, 2016	978-1-935548-89-8
5. "The Dragon Hourglass" (龍刻の砂時計, Ryūkoku no Sunadokei); 6. "The Wave of Destruction" (厄災の波, Yaku Wazawai no Nami); 7. "The Duel" (決闘, Kettō); 8. "The Words I Wanted to Hear" (聞きたかった言葉, Kikitakatta Kotoba); Chapter 8.5: "The Flag On The Kid's Meal"
3	March 23, 2015	978-4-04-067294-6	May 17, 2016	978-1-935548-90-4
9. "Gratitude" (命の御礼, Inochi no Orei); 10. "Hit and Run" (蹴り逃げ, Keri Nige); 11. "Filo" (フィーロ, Fīro); 12. "The Shield of Rage" (憤怒の盾, Fundo no Tate); Chapter 12.5: "Special Extra Chapter"
4	September 19, 2015	978-4-04-067809-2	July 19, 2016	978-1-935548-94-2
13. "Flames of Rage" (怒りの炎, Ikari no Honō); 14. "Filo's Friend" (フィーロの友達, Fīro no Tomodachi); 15. "A Royal Order" (王直々の命令, Ō Jikijiki no Meirei); 16. "Grow Up" (グロウアップ, Gurō Appu); Chapter 16.5: "New Equipment" (新装備, Shin Sōbi)
5	January 23, 2016	978-4-04-067879-5	October 18, 2016	978-1-935548-54-6
17. "Iron Maiden" (アイアンメイデン, Aian Meiden); 18. "Breaking Point" (決別, Ketsubetsu); 19. "Wanted" (指名手配, Shimei Tehai); 20. "The Second Princess's Power" (第二王女の強さ, Dai ni ōjo no Tsuyo-sa); Chapter 20.5: "Extra Story"
6	June 23, 2016	978-4-04-068280-8	May 16, 2017	978-1-944937-10-2
21. "A Nightmare" (悪夢, Akumu); 22. "Nobleman from the past" (因緑の貴族, In Midori no Kizoku); 23. "Tyrant Dragon Rex" (タイラントドラゴンレックス, Tairanto Doragon Rekkusu); 24. "The Legendary Bird God" (伝説の神鳥, Densetsu no Kandori); Chapter 24.5: "Accessories" (付属品, Fuzokuhin)
7	November 21, 2016	978-4-04-068580-9	November 14, 2017	978-1-944937-27-0
25. "Fitoria" (フィトリア, Fitoria); 26. "Filo vs Fitoria" (フィーロVSフィトリア, Fīro VS Fitoria); 27. "The Battle of Shield and Spear" (盾と槍の戦い, Tate to Yari no Tatakai); 28. "Judgement" (裁き, Sabaki)
8	April 22, 2017	978-4-04-069154-1	May 15, 2018	978-1-944937-47-8
29. "Replica" (複製品, Fukuseihin); 30. "Shield of Wrath" (ラースシールド, Rāsu Shīrudo); 31. "The Queen" (女王, Joō); 32. "Paying the Piper" (年貢の納め時, Nengunoosamedoki)
9	September 23, 2017	978-4-04-069414-6	July 17, 2018	978-1-944937-97-3
33. "Meeting of the Heroes" (勇者会議, Yūsha Kaigi); 34. "Last Respects" (墓参り, Hakamairi); 35. "The Cal Mira Islands" (カルミラ島}, Karumira Shima); 36. "NightTime Combat" (夜間戦闘, Yakan Sentō)
10	February 23, 2018	978-4-04-069693-5	April 16, 2019	978-1-64273-016-6
37. "Our Time on the Cal Mira Islands" (カルミラ島の日々, Karumira Shima no Hibi); 38. "Underwater Shrine" (水中神殿, Suichū Shinden); 39. "Inter-Dimensional Whale" (次元の勇魚, Jigen no Isana); 40. "L'Arc Berg" (ラルクベルク, Rarukuberuku)
11	July 23, 2018	978-4-04-069973-8	May 28, 2019	978-1-64273-017-3
41. "Soul-Healing Water" (魂癒水, Tamashī ie Mizu); 42. "Rucolu Barrel Bomb" (ルコ爆樽, Ruko Baku Son); 43. "An Unfortunate Girl" (幸薄少女, Shiawase Usu On'nanoko); 44. "False Accusations Again" (冥罪再び, Mei Tsumi Futatabi); Chapter 44.5: "The Cal Mira Hot Springs"
12	December 21, 2018	978-4-04-065347-1	December 10, 2019	978-1-64273-033-3
45. "New Companion" (新しい仲間, Atarashī Nakama); 46. "Combat Adviser" (戦闘顧問, Sentō Komon); 47. "Hengen Muso Style" (変幻無双流, Hengen Musō-ryū); 48. "Familiars" (使い魔, Tsukai ma)
13	April 23, 2019	978-4-04-065641-0	June 23, 2020	978-1-64273-061-6
49. "Getting Ahead of the Enemy" (出し抜く, Dashinuku); 50. "And So it Begins" (始まり, Hajimari); 51. "The Spirit Tortoise" (霊亀, Reiki); 52. "The Country Above the Spirit Tortoise" (霊亀の上にある国, Reiki no Ue ni Aru Kuni); 53. "Spirit Tortoise Familiar (Human Type)" (霊亀の使い魔（人型), Reiki no Tsukai ma (Hito-gata))
14	September 21, 2019	978-4-04-065825-4	September 8, 2020	978-1-64273-080-7
54. "The Spirit Tortoise Reawakens" (霊亀の再動, Reiki no Sai Dō); 55. "Spirit Tortoise Tyrant" (暴君霊亀, Bōkun Reiki); 56. "Buying Time" (時間稼ぎ, Jikan Kasegi); 57. "The Search" (探索, Tansaku); 58. "Strangers" (霊亀事件の容疑者, Reiki Jiken no Yōgisha)
15	February 22, 2020	978-4-04-064337-3	March 16, 2021	978-1-64273-108-8
59. "The Mastermind" (黒幕, Kuromaku); 60. "A United Front" (共闘, Kyōtō); 61. "The Heart of the Spirit Tortoise" (霊亀の心, Reiki no Kokoro); 62. "Ost Horai" (オスト＝ホウライ, Osuto Hōrai)
16	July 20, 2020	978-4-04-064759-3	September 28, 2021	978-1-64273-131-6
63. "The Never-Ending Labyrinth" (無限迷宮, Mugen Meikyū); 64. "The Hunting Hero" (狩猟具の勇者, Shuryōgu no Yūsha); 65. "Escape" (脱出, Dasshutsu); 66. "Raphtalia" (ラフタリア, Rafutaria); Chapter 66.5: Special Shorts
17	November 21, 2020	978-4-04-065973-2	February 15, 2022	978-1-64273-172-9
67. "The Auction" (実演販売, Jitsuen Hanbai); 68. "Homebound Dragon Vein" (帰路の龍脈, Kiro no Ryūmyaku); 69. "The House of the Hunting Hero" (狩猟具の勇者の帰宅, Shuryōgu no Yūsha no Kitaku); 70. "Shikigami" (式神)
18	March 23, 2021	978-4-04-680287-3	June 14, 2022	978-1-64273-173-6
71. "Angel Rescue Mission" (天女救出作戦, Ten'nyo Kyūshutsu Sakusen); 72. "Humming Fairy" (ハミングフェーリー, Hamingu Fērī); 73. "Reunion" (再会, Saikai); 74. "The Chosen Sword" (刀の選定, Katana no Sentei)
19	September 22, 2021	978-4-04-680728-1	September 13, 2022	978-1-64273-215-3
75. "The Skill of the Hunting Hero" (狩猟具の勇者の技能, Shuryōgu no Yūsha no Ginō); 76. "The Waves" (異世界の波, Isekai no Nami); 77. "The Seeds of War" (戦争の火種, Sensō no Hidane); 78. "A Boar of a Warrior" (猪のような襲撃者, Inoshishi no Yōna Shūgeki-sha)
20	February 22, 2022	978-4-04-681047-2	February 7, 2023	978-1-64273-240-5
79. "Together, With Conditions" (条件付きの同行, Jōken-tsuki no Dōkō); 80. "Reconstructed Beings" (改造された者たち, Kaizō sa Reta-sha-tachi); 81. "Struggling Heart" (抗う心, Aragau Kokoro); 82. "Kyo's Aim" (キョウの狙い, Kyō no Nerai); 83. "The Forest of Fog" (霧の森, Kiri no Mori)
21	June 22, 2022	978-4-04-681452-4	September 19, 2023	978-1-64273-284-9
84. "Kyo's Research" (キョウの研究所, Kyō no Kenkyūjo); 85. "Dimension Wave" (ディメションウェーブ, Dimenshon Wēbu); 86. "Sacrifice Aura" (サクリファイス・オーラ, Sakurifaisu Ōra); 87. "Borrowed Might" (代償の力, Daishō no Chikara); 88. "The Battle's End" (戦いの終わり, Tatakai no Owari)
22	December 22, 2022	978-4-04-681984-0	February 27, 2024	978-1-64273-342-6
89. "The Return of the Shield Hero" (盾の勇者の帰還, Tate no Yūsha no Kikan); 90. "Seaetto" (セーアエット領, Sēaetto-ryō); 91. "Feeding" (餌付け, Edzuke); 92. "The Men and Women of the Sea" (海の男女, Umi no Danjo)
23	June 22, 2023	978-4-04-682516-2	January 7, 2025	978-1-64273-391-4
93. "Zeltoble" (ゼルトブル, Zerutoburu); 94. "Department Store" (デパート, Depāto); 95. "The Dark Coliseum" (闇のコロシアム, Yami no Koroshiamu); 96. "Combat and Intrigue" (襲撃と陰謀, Shūgeki to Inbō)
24	November 22, 2023	978-4-04-683042-5	July 22, 2025	978-1-64273-453-9
97. "Nadia" (ナディア); 98. "Transformation" (獣人化, Jūjinka); 99. "Exhibition Match" (エキシビジョンマッチ, Ekishibijon Matchi); 100. "The Might of the Underworld" (闇の権力, Yami no Kenryoku)
25	April 23, 2024	978-4-04-683504-8	October 14, 2025	978-1-64273-503-1
101. "Herbs of the Sacred Tree" (神木の薬, Shinboku no Kusuri); 102. "The Shield that Guards the Shield" (盾を守る盾, Tate o Mamoru Tate); 103. "Trash and the Hakuko" (クズとハクコ, Kuzu to Hakuko); 104. "The Spear Hero Hunt" (槍の勇者捕縛計画, Yari no Yūsha Hobaku Keikaku)
26	October 22, 2024	978-4-04-684073-8	May 26, 2026	978-1-642735-40-6
105. "The Day the Game Ended" (ゲームが終わった日, Gēmu ga Owatta hi); 106. "Witch" (ヴィッチ, Vitchi); 107. "A New Awakening" (新たな目覚め, Aratana Mezame); 108. "The Fundoshi Dog" (ふんどし犬, Fundoshi inu)
27	February 21, 2025	978-4-04-684489-7	September 8, 2026	978-1-642735-78-9
109. "Ambush" (襲撃, Shūgeki); 110. "An Official Quest" (正式依頼, Seishiki Irai); 111. "The Masked Man" (仮面の男, Kamen no Otoko); 112. "The Rewards of Invading Another World" (異世界侵略のメリット, Isekai Shinryaku no Meritto)
28	July 23, 2025	978-4-04-684916-8	—	—
113. "Temptation" (テンプテーション, Tenputēshon); 114. "Flash" (閃光, Senkō); 115. "Reconciling with the Sword Hero" (剣の勇者との和解, Ken no Yūsha to no Wakai); 116. "A Morning in the Life of the Shield Hero" (盾の勇者の朝, Tate no Yūsha no Asa)
29	December 23, 2025	978-4-04-685428-5	—	—
117. "Alchimist" (錬金術師, Renkinjutsushi); 118. "Dragon Egg" (ドラゴンの卵, Doragon no Tamago); 119. "Gaelion" (ガエリオン, Gaerion); 120. "Filolial and Dragon" (フィロリアルとドラゴン, Firoriaru to Doragon)
30	May 22, 2026	978-4-04-660111-7	—	—
121. Dragon's Roar (竜の咆哮, Ryū no Hōkō); 122. The Corrupted Land (汚染された大地, Osen Sareta Daichi); 123. The Demon Dragon (魔竜, Maryū); 124. Forced Power-Up (強制強化, Kyōsei Kyōka)
31	November 20, 2026	978-4-04-660680-8	—	—
125. Perfect Hidden Justice (パーフェクト＝ハイド＝ジャスティス, Pāfekuto＝Haido＝Jasutisu); 126. Itsuki and Rishia (イツキとリーシア, Itsuki to Rīshia); 127. Seigi VS Seigi (正義VS正義); 128. Hīrō Ganbō (ヒーロー願望)

=== The Reprise of the Spear Hero ===
No.	Original release date	Original ISBN	English release date	English ISBN
1	December 22, 2017	978-4-04-069525-9	November 12, 2019	978-1-64273-034-0
2	March 22, 2018	978-4-04-069781-9	May 19, 2020	978-1-64273-060-9
3	December 21, 2018	978-4-04-065341-9	December 16, 2020	978-1-64273-081-4
4	March 22, 2019	978-4-04-065603-8	June 15, 2021	978-1-64273-109-5
5	August 23, 2019	978-4-04-065848-3	August 17, 2021	978-1-64273-129-3
6	February 22, 2020	978-4-04-064355-7	November 30, 2021	978-1-64273-130-9
7	November 21, 2020	978-4-04-065961-9	February 1, 2022	978-1-64273-171-2
8	September 21, 2021	978-4-04-680478-5	July 11, 2023	978-1-64273-250-4
9	February 21, 2022	978-4-04-680872-1	October 3, 2023	978-1-64273-285-6
10	August 20, 2022	978-4-04-681525-5	November 26, 2024	978-1-64273-399-0
11	March 23, 2023	978-4-04-681525-5	—	—

=== Tate no Yūsha no to aru Ichi Nichi ===
No.	Japanese release date	Japanese ISBN
1	March 27, 2019	978-4-04-912431-6
2	December 26, 2019	978-4-04-912922-9
3	August 26, 2020	978-4-04-913351-6

=== Tate no Yūsha no Oshinagaki ===
No.	Japanese release date	Japanese ISBN
1	February 22, 2020	978-4-04-064199-7
2	September 23, 2020	978-4-04-064908-5
3	March 23, 2021	978-4-04-680268-2
4	February 21, 2022	978-4-04-680873-8
5	June 23, 2022	978-4-04-681441-8
6	February 22, 2023	978-4-04-682143-0
7	September 22, 2023	978-4-04-682803-3
