= The Rising of the Shield Hero season 1 =

The Rising of the Shield Hero
- Season 1
- Logo for the first season
- No. of episodes: 25

Release
- Original network: AT-X
- Original release: January 9 – June 26, 2019

Season chronology
- Next → Season 2

The Rising of the Shield Hero is an anime television series produced by Kinema Citrus and directed by Takao Abo, with Keigo Koyanagi handling series composition, Masahiro Suwa designing the characters, and Kevin Penkin composing the music. The first season adapts the first five volumes of the light novel series of the same title written by Aneko Yusagi. The first season ran from January 9 to June 26, 2019, on AT-X and other networks. The season ran for 25 episodes and adapted the first five volumes of the light novel series, including parts from volume 6. It uses four pieces of theme music: two opening themes and two ending themes. The first opening theme is "Rise", performed by Madkid, while the first ending theme is "Kimi no Namae" (きみの名前), performed by Chiai Fujikawa. The second opening theme is "Faith", also performed by Madkid, while the second ending theme is "While I'm Next to You" (あたしが隣にいるうちに, Atashi ga Tonari ni Iru Uchi ni), performed by Fujikawa. For episode 4, Asami Seto sang an insert song titled "Falling Through Starlight" as her portrayed character Raphtalia.

== Episodes ==
No. overall	No. in season	Title	Directed by	Written by	Storyboarded by	Original release date
1	1	"The Shield Hero"; Transliteration: "Tate no Yūsha" (Japanese: 盾の勇者)	Hitoshi Haga	Keigo Koyanagi	Takao Abo	January 9, 2019
While in the library, college student Naofumi Iwatani finds a fantasy book about "The Four Heroes": Spear, Sword, Bow, and Shield. He is then suddenly sucked into the book and summoned to another world with three others to save mankind from The Waves, a series of demonic invasions. Naofumi discovers he is the Shield Hero, and learns from the other Heroes, who were each summoned from different Earths, that the Shield Hero is considered the weakest of them all. When the party members are assigned, nobody joins Naofumi, until Myne, a member of the Spear Hero's party, offers to join him. Soon afterward, Myne steals his belongings and accuses him of raping her. Naofumi's denials are ignored by all, and he becomes an outcast, shown kindness only by Erhard, the weapon-smith who realizes he is innocent. Embittered and enraged, Naofumi begins scrounging for materials and learns how to upgrade his shield with resources he finds in the world. After fighting away some thugs who wanted to rob him, he realizes he can't upgrade without experience or strength. Approached by slave trader Beloukas, Naofumi is brought to a slave market so a slave may gain XP and fight for him. In the corner of the room, Naofumi finds a demi-human slave girl cowering in a cage.
2	2	"The Slave Girl"; Transliteration: "Dorei no Shōjo" (Japanese: 奴隷の少女)	Seung-hui Son	Ohine Ezaki	Seung-hui Son	January 16, 2019
While Beloukas offers Naofumi a high-level Wolf-man, Naofumi instead buys the much cheaper Tanuki girl, Raphtalia. They place a slave crest on her to prevent Raphtalia from betraying or disobeying Naofumi without feeling intense pain, while also linking shared experience gained by one to the other. Raphtalia's recurring nightmares of her parents' deaths in the first Wave have deeply scarred her, making her initially hesitant to kill. Both leave the capital for the small town of Lute for a mine to collect valuable ore, but they're attacked by a high-level dog monster that wounds Naofumi; as the same beast type which killed her parents, the monster's appearance sends Raphtalia into shock. Seeing her fear, Naofumi tells her to escape while he buys time. Confronting her feelings of regret and helplessness, Raphtalia summons up the courage to kill the beast. Naofumi comforts Raphtalia, promising not to leave her and she agrees to help him defeat the Waves so other children won't suffer as she has. Later at dinnertime, Naofumi decorates a toothpick flag to make the Flag of Japan, a sign of his intent to someday return home.
3	3	"Wave of Catastrophe"; Transliteration: "Saiyaku no Nami" (Japanese: 災厄の波)	Satoshi Mori	Ohine Ezaki	Satoshi Mori	January 23, 2019
After a month of leveling up in preparation for the next Wave, Naofumi unlocks a huge variety of transformations for his shield, each with a unique ability, while Raphtalia rapidly matures into a young woman. To determine the time remaining until the next Wave, Naofumi and Raphtalia visit the Capital's Cathedral and its Dragon Hourglass, which measures the time between Waves. Much to his chagrin, they also meet the three other Heroes, who still scorn him and view him as a liability. Rapthalia wonders why the other Heroes despise Naofumi, but he refuses to tell her. The next day, the Wave begins. While the other Heroes and their allies rush to defeat the main force, Naofumi and Raphtalia head to Lute to help evacuate the civilians. Some knights arrive to help but initially disregard Naofumi's orders, though when they realize he is trying to protect the villagers, some choose to aid him. The others leave to join the other Heroes, who defeat the main boss and end the Wave. After the battle, the villagers thank Naofumi for his help. The hourglass resets, starting the countdown for the next Wave.
4	4	"Lullaby at Dawn"; Transliteration: "Akatsuki no Komoriuta" (Japanese: 暁の子守唄)	Seung-hui Son	Ohine Ezaki	Takao Abo, Yuka Kuroda	January 30, 2019
After repelling the Wave of Catastrophe, the Heroes are treated to a state dinner, which Naofumi reluctantly attends. Myne informs Motoyasu that Raphtalia is a slave, prompting him to challenge Naofumi to a duel for her freedom. Despite Naofumi declining the challenge, King Aultcray Melromarc takes Raphtalia, forcing the duel. Despite Motoyasu's higher level, Naofumi's many shields and superior tactics quickly give him the upper hand, but Myne openly uses wind magic to trip Naofumi, letting Motoyasu claim victory. When Aultcray reveals Myne is his daughter, Malty, Naofumi realizes they planned his defamation. With Raphtalia's slave seal removed, Naofumi's burning hatred within him unlocks the "Cursed Series". However, Raphtalia slaps Motoyasu, condemning him for his false chivalry and positing that if he truly wanted to free slaves, he'd have some freedmen in his party. Ren and Itsuki also openly condemn Myne's interference, incensed Aultcray would allow such blatant cheating. Raphtalia returns to Naofumi's side, maturing into a young adult, reaffirming her loyalty to him, and the Cursed Series subsides. The next morning, Naofumi eats a breakfast sandwich Raphtalia made him, finding that he can finally taste food again. His confidence and hope renewed, Naofumi is now assured that Raphtalia is truly his ally.
5	5	"Filo"; Transliteration: "Fīro" (Japanese: フィーロ)	Toshiharu Kudō	Daisuke Tazawa	Hitoshi Haga	February 6, 2019
In another land on diplomatic travel, Queen Mirellia Q. Melromarc learns of the duel at the castle. At Beloukas' tent, Raphtalia asks for a new slave seal as a show of good faith to Naofumi, while Naofumi buys a gatcha monster egg, which later hatches into a Filolial. Naming her "Filo", she immediately imprints on Naofumi, reaching adulthood in a few days due to a skill of his. Visiting Lute Village, Naofumi is shocked by Motoyasu and Myne declaring the village to be under Motoyasu's rule by royal decree. Naofumi, aware of the town's money limitations, attempts to block the heavy taxes Myne plans to levy, until Mirellia's envoys arrive to deliver a message to Myne. Disturbed with the contents, she challenges Naofumi to a race to possess the village. Naofumi joins when Filo comically kicks Motoyasu into the air, and rides her against Motoyasu's dragon. The soldiers use magic to cheat in Motoyasu's favor, but Naofumi still wins, forcing Malty to relent when Mirellia's envoys expose her cheating. On the way back from Lute, Naofumi and Raphtalia stop to rest, and the next day, they are surprised to find Filo transformed into a little girl with wings and can talk.
6	6	"A New Comrade"; Transliteration: "Atarashii Nakama" (Japanese: 新しい仲間)	Shigeki Awai	Daisuke Tazawa	Hidetoshi Namura	February 13, 2019
Naofumi brings Filo to Erhard, who sends them to the Dressmaker, who in turn sends them to the Magic Shop Owner to make magic clothes for Filo. However, the Magic Shop Owner needs a new magic gemstone for her loom, vital to make the magic thread. Escorting a wealthy trader who will help his party, a bandit group attack his wagon and are defeated. When they gloat they will go unpunished due to Naofumi's defamation, he extorts them into giving him all their loot or Filo will eat them. Impressing the Trader, Naofumi learns new skills and is introduced to new contacts, even gaining a warrant to mine a quarry at a discount. As Naofumi's party and the Magic Shop Owner search for the magic gemstone, they find an abandoned alchemist tomb housing a cursed seed, but find the seed missing. After fighting creatures through the tunnels, they locate a gem vein where a Nue has made a nest in it. After they kill the beast and obtain the gemstone, the Magic Shop Owner helps Filo make the magic thread, which in turn lets the Dressmaker make Filo a dress that transforms with her body.
7	7	"The Savior of the Heavenly Fowl"; Transliteration: "Shinchō no Seijin" (Japanese: 神鳥の聖人)	Yūji Tokuno	Daisuke Tazawa	Seung-hui Son, Yuka Kuroda	February 20, 2019
Tasked by the Trader to deliver herbicide to a village, Naofumi's party discover the village overrun by a monstrous plant. They learn that the seed from the tomb is what Motoyasu used to end a local famine, but the sprouted plant came alive and began attacking the villagers. With Motoyasu gone, they turn to Naofumi, who defeats the monster plant and alters the seeds to be safe. With the villagers unable to pay him for the seeds, he takes them to the Trader for sale, who gives him a job to deliver merchandise to a hot springs' village. Staying the night, Raphtalia is jealous of Naofumi and Filo spending time together, but learns of a special gem a local bird collects. Raphtalia ventures off to get the gem for Naofumi, but she is joined by Filo who wants the bird eggs. On the way, a silver boar attacks and chases them to the nest, knocking the jewels off the cliff and trampling over the eggs. Enraged, the two kill it and sell the body, taking the proceeds to buy a special tool which they give to Naofumi to use in his gem work.
8	8	"Curse Shield"; Transliteration: "Noroi no Tate" (Japanese: 呪いの盾)	Hitoshi Haga	Daisuke Tazawa	Hitoshi Haga	February 27, 2019
Learning of a mysterious disease spreading through a village, Naofumi's party goes to investigate and finds out the disease began after Ren killed a Dragon nearby and left the body to rot instead of properly disposing of it. Monsters had gathered around its corpse and the decomposing body rendered the entire area toxic. Naofumi's party set out for the corpse, which resurrects into a zombie dragon. During their fight, the dragon swallows Filo, seemingly killing her, which triggers Naofumi's despair and rage to activate his cursed "Rage Shield". Naofumi repels the dragon's attacks with strong defense and passive flames at the cost of losing his composure. When Naofumi recovers, he realizes Raphtalia was burned trying to bring him to his senses. To their surprise Filo bursts out of the dragon's belly, having eaten the internal crystal empowering it. Filo finds another crystal and gives it to Naofumi, but his level isn't high enough to use the shield it unlocks. Back at the village, Naofumi learns Raphtalia's wounds from the cursed shield can only be cured with high-grade Holy Water and regrets having put his companions in trouble, determined to make himself and his party stronger.
9	9	"Melty"; Transliteration: "Meruti" (Japanese: メルティ)	Toshiharu Kudō	Ohine Ezaki	Toshiharu Kudō, Kōji Furukuwa	March 6, 2019
Naofumi's party head to the capital for Holy Water to heal Raphtalia, and comes across a blue-haired girl named Melty with some Filolials. Melty quickly befriends Filo, who asks to accompany them to the capital. Once there, Filo and Melty go their own way as Naofumi and Raphtalia go to the Church. The clergy attempt to scam Naofumi with their lowest-quality Holy Water, but the Pope cordially grants Naofumi High Grade Pure Holy Water when the Hero points out the issue. In the town square, Motoyasu attacks Naofumi having learned about Filo, demanding her freedom from being his slave, unaware Filo is Naofumi's Filolial. Motoyasu starts attacking with reckless abandon as Myne permits it, but Melty arrives to order them to stop just as Filo, remembering Motoyasu's insults, transforms and kicks him away. Meeting at Erhard's shop, Melty explains to Naofumi's party that she is the second princess who was made heiress apparent by Mirellia due to her older sister Malty's toxic personality. Before she can continue, Naofumi states his distrust towards the royal family and dismisses her.
10	10	"In the Midst of Turmoil"; Transliteration: "Konmei no Naka de" (Japanese: 混迷の中で)	Jun Takahashi	Ohine Ezaki	Takao Abo	March 13, 2019
Dejected, Melty goes to her father to talk while Naofumi is met by a small party wishing to join him to fight in the Wave after he saved Lute Village, their hometown. Naofumi will only allow it if they pay 150 silver coins to prove their loyalty. As Raphtalia and Filo are ready for Class Upgrades (level cap increases), a royal decree forbids the Shield Hero's party from using Melromarc's Dragon Hourglass. On advice by Beloukas, Naofumi plans to head for neighboring Shieldfreeden for their Hourglass, but the next Wave will strike before they reach it. While scouting towns, Naofumi happens upon starving refugees who fled a revolution started by Itsuki. Returning for the next Wave, Naofumi encounters Ren and Itsuki, who accuse him of stealing their rewards. Naofumi explains Itsuki's "revolution" only put in a new government just as corrupt as the old one, and Ren leaving the slain dragon's corpse behind caused a plague. Ren sees Raphtalia's wounds and believes him, but Itsuki remains adamant that Naofumi is lying. Later, Erhard gives Naofumi upgraded armor and the Lute party returns with 150 silvers. Naofumi has them buy better gear with the money, accepting them, as the next Wave approaches 24 hours away.
11	11	"Catastrophe Returns"; Transliteration: "Saiyaku, Futatabi" (Japanese: 災厄、再び)	Hodaka Kuramoto	Daisuke Tazawa	Erukin Kawabata	March 20, 2019
Equipping Raphtalia and Filo and annexing the Lute Party with Knight Ake as their unit captain, the Wave starts and Ake's unit help civilians while Naofumi's party kills monsters. Seeing an elderly woman, who Naofumi healed during his travels, easily defeat monsters, she reveals herself to be a retired adventurer. After three hours, Naofumi worries about the other Heroes' progress, so he leaves Ake's party with the elderly woman to protect the civilians. Finding the other Hero parties haphazardly attacking a Dutchman, Naofumi chastises their inattention, having Raphtalia expose the hidden Boss: a massive Soul Eater. Naofumi resorts to using his Cursed Shield, but the Zombie Dragon's soul inhabiting the Shield is furious for Ren killing it and Naofumi incorporating it into his gear. The attempted takeover sends Naofumi and Filo into a fury against the Soul Eater, but Naofumi remembers his mission and regains control to use a new power for the win: Iron Maiden. Victorious, Naofumi returns to normal, but a second Soul Eater appears and is easily killed by a new enemy: Glass, a woman in a black kimono wielding twin-bladed War Fans, the true enemy of this Wave.
12	12	"The Raven Invader"; Transliteration: "Shikkoku no Ihōsha" (Japanese: 漆黒の異邦者)	Shigeki Awai	Daisuke Tazawa	Yasuhiro Irie	March 27, 2019
Glass easily defeats the other three hero parties, and challenges Naofumi's party. Even against Naofumi's many shields with Raphtalia and Filo's support, they can't land a single blow. Calling for tactical retreat, Glass attempts long range attacks, but retreats when the Waves' time limit hits, ending on a stalemate. After the battle, Naofumi ponders the Wave's time limits and their true purpose when he is summoned back to the castle. Aultcray demands he reveal the secret behind his abilities, but Naofumi demands Aultcray kneel and beg. Enraged, Aultcray attempts to extort Filo and Raphtalia, but Naofumi threatens him with a worse outcome should he try. As he leaves, a woman covertly warns Naofumi about the Church conspiring against him. Melty attempts to convince her father to reconcile with Naofumi, but Malty exacerbates the situation. After Erhard provides them with travel gear and supplies, Naofumi's party departs to Shieldfreeden for Raphtalia and Filo's Class Ups. While en route, they are met by Melty, who wants Naofumi to reconcile with Aultcray. Naofumi senses something is wrong moments before one of Melty's bodyguards attempts to assassinate her, but Naofumi protects her.
13	13	"The Devil of the Shield"; Transliteration: "Tate no Akuma" (Japanese: 盾の悪魔)	Hitoshi Haga	Ohine Ezaki	Hitoshi Haga	April 3, 2019
Seeing Naofumi protect Melty, the attacking knights accuse him of taking her hostage, but are repelled. Naofumi finds the pendant on a guard for the Church of the Three Heroes, which hates the Shield. At the Royal Palace, wizards edit the recording of Naofumi "kidnapping" Melty, making him a fugitive. Planning to protect Melty to fix their situation, Naofumi's party hike the mountains to reach nearby Siltvelt. At night, a loose rock alerts nearby guards, and the other three Heroes. As Melty attempts to explain the situation, Malty orders they ignore her, claiming Naofumi has a brainwashing shield, despite lack of evidence; the Heroes fall for this. Naofumi attempts to flee with Melty, but Motoyasu uses a magic shackle to stop Filo. After Naofumi resorts to using his Rage Shield to escape, Itsuki and Ren begin to doubt Myne when she openly attacks without regard for Melty's safety. Naofumi gives Ren the Church pendant, calling for an investigation as he departs. One of Mirellia's Emissaries helps remove Filo's shackle and relays Mirellia's desire to meet Naofumi. Naofumi realizes the emissary is the same woman who warned him about the Church. Naofumi, however, decides to keep heading for Siltvelt, since meeting Mirellia would take them in the opposite direction. Meanwhile, Myne sets a forest fire to flush Naofumi out.
14	14	"Everlasting Memory"; Transliteration: "Kesenai Kioku" (Japanese: 消せない記憶)	Naoki Murata	Ohine Ezaki	Hidetoshi Namura	April 10, 2019
Naofumi's party are forced to avoid the forest fire to escape Myne's knights. The next morning, the border to Siltvelt is closed by Royal decree, leaving Naofumi no choice but to meet Mirellia. As they travel, they run into Nobleman Van Reichnott, who rules the area and who is acquaintances with Melty. Bringing them to his manor, Reichnott is informed of their situation, and invites them to stay the night. Come dawn, Reichnott is arrested while the maids hide Naofumi and Raphtalia in the kitchen pantry and Melty distracts the knights. Their leader, Nobleman Idol Rabier, arrives and escorts Melty to his manor. Seeing Raphtalia's anxiety with Rabier, Naofumi calms her to let Melty's plan work. Once Rabier leaves, Naofumi finds Filo, and they make their way to Rabier's estate. As demi-humans loyal to Reichnott besiege the gates for his release, Naofumi uses this to infiltrate the castle, where Reichnott is tortured in front of Melty for Rabier's amusement. Naofumi manages to enter the manor and rescue Melty and Reichnott. Raphtalia confronts Rabier, who pitifully begs for mercy.
15	15	"Raphtalia"; Transliteration: "Rafutaria" (Japanese: ラフタリア)	Toshiharu Kudō	Ohine Ezaki	Takao Abo	April 17, 2019
In a flashback, Raphtalia's home village is destroyed by the first Wave, and the villagers are enslaved by Melromarc troops. She and her best friend Rifana are sold to Idol Rabier. Raphtalia ultimately breaks as Rifana dies from illness and Rabier sells her to Beloukas, leading her to Naofumi. Back in the present, Raphtalia is about to strike when Naofumi reminds her how much she's grown. Realizing killing Rabier would bring her no peace, she spares him. Insulted, Rabier fights to kill her, but using her Mana Sword she wounds him, and he falls back out of a window. Helping Reichnott, Raphtalia guides them to the underground prison, finding demi-human survivors, including her old friend Keel. Raphtalia breaks down upon finding Rifana's remains, left in the cell to rot, believing she abandoned her. To restore her spirits, Naofumi admits that he finally started to trust again because of her, and how she saved him from darkness. Reassured, Raphtalia promises to go home someday to rebuild and give Rifana a proper burial. In the courtyard, a still living Rabier frees a sealed away ancient Tyrannosaurus-like Dragon monster, which promptly kills him and heads for Naofumi.
16	16	"Filolial Queen"; Transliteration: "Firoriaru no Joō" (Japanese: フィロリアルの女王)	Ryū Nakayama	Ryū Nakayama	Ryū Nakayama	April 24, 2019
As Naofumi's party confronts the Rex-Dragon Rabier released, Melty sees Filo and the monster glow with the same light, deducing how to bait it to a large lake. There they fight the monster, but their attacks have no effect until a massive Filolial Queen appears and easily defeats it. The Filolial Queen takes a human form, introducing herself as Fitoria, and spirits them to a Filolial sanctuary in a far away ruins. Naofumi asks Fitoria about Filo's true nature, and Fitoria answers Filo's growth is due to a Hero raising her, and Naofumi informs her of his story. Frustrated by the Heroes' infighting, Fitoria informs Naofumi about the Waves ravaging the entire world, not just Melromarc. Fitoria has been protecting the other nations alone to fulfill the last wish of the Hero who raised her, but knows she will soon perish. She urges Naofumi to make amends with the other Heroes, but he refuses. Fitoria explains that if the Heroes can't unite, she has no choice but to kill them so four new Heroes can be summoned. Meanwhile, Ren and Itsuki follow Naofumi's lead to investigate the Church, discovering a hidden library, unaware Malty is observing them.
17	17	"A Promise Made"; Transliteration: "Tsumugareru Yakusoku" (Japanese: 紡がれる約束)	Hodaka Kuramoto	Katsuji Yatsushige, Keigo Koyanagi	Tatsuhiko Komatsu	May 1, 2019
The next morning, Fitoria takes Melty hostage to coerce Naofumi to make up with the Heroes. To test his convictions, she fights Filo with both limited to human form. While outmatched, Filo is able to break Fitoria's magic defense. Satisfied, Fitoria names Filo as her successor which grants her base stat increases. Fitoria force-unlocks many Filolial Shields for Naofumi, which he can't use yet. After everyone goes to sleep, she asks Naofumi to try to work with the other Heroes, warning him that saving "the world" is far different than saving "the people", and the Heroes will eventually have to make that choice later. Additionally, Fitoria notes the Heroes are still too weak to defeat the Waves properly, and if they don't unite, she will make good on her promise to kill them. She enchants Naofumi's armor to better resist the negative effects of the Rage Shield. Based on her actions and behavior, Naofumi deduces a previous Shield Hero raised Fitoria, but she can't remember after living for so long. In Melromarc, Ren and Itsuki's parties find a hidden cave, but an attack from above collapses the cave.
18	18	"A Conspiracy Linked"; Transliteration: "Tsuranaru Inbō" (Japanese: 連なる陰謀)	Naoki Murata	Daisuke Tazawa	Hitoshi Haga, Tatsuhiko Komatsu	May 8, 2019
Fitoria takes Naofumi and his party to a place near one of the Heroes so that he can start reconciling with them. Parting ways, Naofumi's party arrives at an outpost where they encounter Motoyasu, who Naofumi attempts to reason with. However, Motoyasu refuses to listen, accusing Naofumi of killing Ren and Itsuki. As Naofumi tries to question him, Malty affirms a Church official found evidence against Naofumi. Their fight escalates into a full battle between Naofumi and Motoyasu's parties, with Naofumi's side winning despite the severe level gaps. Suddenly, Filo senses impending danger from above and convinces Naofumi to use multiple shields to defend against a massive ray of light that soon after incinerates everything around them. The attack was sent by Pope Balmus and his followers, revealing he ordered Ren and Itsuki's deaths as part of his plan to kill the "false heroes" and the princesses in order to overthrow the monarchy. Pope Balmus then draws a magical sword and prepares to attack both parties.
19	19	"The Four Cardinal Heroes"; Transliteration: "Shisei Yūsha" (Japanese: 四聖勇者)	Hitoshi Haga	Daisuke Tazawa	Hitoshi Haga	May 15, 2019
Melty recognizes that Pope Balmus wields an ancient weapon that replicates all the Four Cardinal Weapons, that was supposedly lost long ago. Naofumi and Motoyasu are unable to breach the weapon's defenses as it is powered by hundreds of Balmus' loyalists. Just then, Ren and Itsuki appear to help, explaining they were rescued by Mirellia's special forces, the Shadows. They also reveal an army, personally led by Mirellia, is coming to subdue the Church, who refuse to surrender. While the Heroes join forces against the Pope, Naofumi refuses given the harm they caused, detailing their consequences, lack of coordination, and how he had to rectify them. Naofumi explains they were ignorant of how to be Heroes and properly clean up, leading the Church to see them as fakes and plan a coup d'état. The Pope takes advantage of their discussion to fire an attack, which Naofumi blocks. Naofumi equates the other Heroes to the Pope, but agrees to work with them only out of his promise to Fitoria. Now, the Four Cardinal Heroes stand together, but Pope Balmus responds by enclosing the battlefield inside a magical cathedral.
20	20	"Battle of Good and Evil"; Transliteration: "Seija Kessen" (Japanese: 聖邪決戦)	Takuma Suzuki	Daisuke Tazawa	Takao Abo, Yuka Kuroda	May 22, 2019
The Four Heroes have no success in breaking through Balmus' Cathedral Spell and Naofumi finds his Rage Shield's curse effect is greatly nullified within the Cathedral. Pope Balmus endangers the lives of his followers by siphoning more mana from them to charge a larger attack. In order to block it, Naofumi takes the risk of releasing the Dragon Soul in his Rage Shield. Donning new Berserker armor and struggling to keep control while his rage fuels him, Raphtalia, Filo, and Melty snap him out of it, though they are all burned by the cursed flames. A focused Naofumi blocks Balmus' attack and the loss of many of his followers prevents him from quickly regaining mana. With the other three Heroes coordinating an attack to break Balmus' defenses, Naofumi charges on Filo, setting Balmus ablaze. However, Balmus uses an advanced counter ability and nearly wins until Queen Mirellia's army arrives to support them. Using the opportunity, Naofumi uses his Blood Sacrifice power, severely draining his own blood to power it, to kill Balmus and destroy his Replica Weapon. As Mirellia's army arrests the Pope's followers, she properly introduces herself to the Heroes and promises to save the dying Naofumi's life.
21	21	"Naofumi's Triumphant Return"; Transliteration: "Naofumi no Gaisen" (Japanese: 尚文の凱旋)	Takao Abo	Keigo Koyanagi	Takao Abo	May 29, 2019
After Naofumi spends three days recovering, Queen Mirellia apologizes to Naofumi for all the troubles the Church of the Three Heroes, Myne, and Aultcray had caused him, claiming that she was absent due to the commotion caused by them summoning all four Heroes, as they originally intended to have a hero summoned by a different nation to fight the Waves around the world. The next day, she dethrones Aultcray and puts a slave sigil on Myne to force her to confess all her crimes. For their transgressions, Mirellia removes all of Myne and Aultcray's royal privileges and sentences them to death. However, just as they are about to be executed, Naofumi, realizing that Myne is truly pleading for her life, interrupts the execution and proposes that both Myne and Aultcray should be spared; that the death penalty is too merciful for them. He then proposes having their names officially changed to "Bitch"/"Whore" and "Trash" respectively, mandating all citizens not address them otherwise. The Queen agrees to this, seeing it as a more suiting punishment, and then declares that the Church of the Three Heroes will be abolished while the original religion that worshipped all four Heroes will be reinstated in its place. Afterward, Naofumi's party bid farewell to Melty, who decides to remain at the castle as a princess whilst they fight the Waves. After they leave, Mirellia reveals to Melty she was going to sacrifice herself to appease the public opinion and stop the execution had Naofumi not intervened on his own. Exiting the city, the Shield party is bid farewell by the Melromarc citizens and Naofumi finally accepts his role as the Shield Hero.
22	22	"Four Heroes Council"; Transliteration: "Yūsha Kaigi" (Japanese: 勇者会議)	Kōji Furukuwa	Ohine Ezaki	Kōji Furukuwa	June 5, 2019
Naofumi's party goes to the Dragon Hourglass to receive their Class Up upgrades, but the ritual does not let Raphtialia and Filo pick their upgrades, most likely due to their slave marks; instead they are forced into a class; this also means they actually do have an upgraded class. When they go to upgrade there are two icons for each of them. Raphtalia's is a sword and bow, she was given the sword class, while Filo's icons were wind and heals, she was given the wind class. Later they complain that they were unable to choose a class and they were forced into one. Mirellia speculates Fitoria's blessing is interfering somehow, revealing herself a Filolial Otaku. During a banquet, the Four Heroes have a private meeting whilst Raphtalia fights a drunken Bow Party member, Mald, for insulting Naofumi, causing a brawl amongst the Hero parties. Meanwhile, Melty thwarts Bitch (Myne) attempting to poison Raphtalia's and Filo's food. During the meeting, Mirellia informs the Heroes of the upcoming special Cal Mira Archipelago event, where everyone gains bonus experience points, giving them the opportunity to level up before the next Wave. To help each other, the Heroes elaborate on their weapons' hidden functions, including a special weapon copy system. However, they devolve into arguing over the better power leveling method, so Naofumi leaves in disgust. The next day, Naofumi copies all of Erhard's shields before visiting Raphtalia's abandoned village to pay respect to Rifana's grave. As he ponders rebuilding the village someday, Naofumi briefly encounters a pair of travelers. The next morning, Naofumi boards the ship headed for Cal Mira. However, since the other Heroes took most of the ship's cabins, Naofumi's party must share a room with the aforementioned pair of travelers: L'Arc Berg and Therese Alexandrite.
23	23	"Cal Mira Archipelago"; Transliteration: "Karu Mira-tō" (Japanese: カルミラ島)	Toshiharu Kudō	Daisuke Tazawa	Toshiharu Kudō	June 12, 2019
Introducing themselves, L'Arc and Therese think Naofumi's name is an alias, having heard of the despicable Shield Hero. Once the Heroes arrive at Cal Mira, Governor Habenburg escorts Naofumi's party to the Resort Inn, while the other Hero Parties recover from seasickness. Learning a new Boosting Spell, Naofumi takes his party for XP Grinding across the archipelago, fashioning new weapons from monsters for Raphtalia and Filo. At night, a concerned L'Arc and Therese find Naofumi's party and take them to a party at a diner to end the day. After Therese patrons Naofumi for an accessory, he crafts a beautiful item with a rare gem, much to Therese's jubilation. The following day, co-oping with L'Arc and Therese to grind XP, Naofumi also learns Therese's magic flames actually heal him when engulfed. By sunset, the duo take their leave, thanking Naofumi for the day and hope to meet again soon. As Naofumi's Party are relaxing at the beach, Filo discovers an Undersea Temple, piquing Naofumi's curiosity to investigate. Upon arrival, Naofumi's Shield opens the door, where a Dragon Hourglass resides and by linking to it, he learns the next Wave is due at Cal Mira in 48 hours.
24	24	"Guardians of Another World"; Transliteration: "Isekai no Shugosha" (Japanese: 異世界の守護者)	Takanori Yamamoto, Takuma Suzuki	Daisuke Tazawa	Yuka Kuroda, Hidetoshi Namura	June 19, 2019
Learning of the Wave, Naofumi warns Mirellia and she amasses a large naval fleet while L'Arc and Therese also sail to the Waves with the Fleet. While the navy fights the smaller creatures, the Four Heroes fight the Boss monster, but they are unable to do much damage to it and it is L'Arc and Therese that ultimately kill it. L'Arc and Therese then attack the Heroes, explaining they are from yet another world besieged by the Waves. In order to save their homeworld, they must kill the Four Heroes. L'Arc easily knocks the other Three Heroes away, while Therese keeps the Fleet at bay, leaving only Naofumi's party to face them. L'Arc and Therese initially have the upper hand, fending off Raphtalia and Filo's attacks while managing to partly bypass Naofumi's defenses. Melty then intervenes in the battle, with her presence contributing magical support, helping Naofumi focus on the battle. Naofumi's party soon outsmart L'Arc and Therese through clever tactics, resulting in L'Arc being wounded, but Glass suddenly arrives, revealing she is allied with L'Arc and Therese. Glass is impressed with Naofumi being stronger since last they met, preparing to battle him again.
25	25	"The Rising of the Shield Hero"; Transliteration: "Tate no Yūsha no Nariagari" (Japanese: 盾の勇者の成り上がり)	Shinpei Wada, Kōji Furukuwa, Takao Abo	Keigo Koyanagi	Takao Abo	June 26, 2019
Naofumi confronts Glass in single combat, where she reveals herself as a Hero from L'Arc's homeworld, the "Fan Hero". Naofumi discovers Glass is weak against his Soul Eater shield, but hesitates, unwilling to kill her since he realizes she is trying to protect her own world. Raphtalia then intervenes, reminding Naofumi that there are many people in this world that he wants to protect. Meanwhile, Mirellia finds Rishia Ivyred, a Bow Party novice, and has her launch liquor barrels at Glass. Glass is quickly intoxicated by the powerful alcohol, forcing L'Arc and Therese to help her to withdraw as the Wave's time limit runs out. Returning to Cal Mira, Naofumi ponders the revelation of other worlds fighting the Waves, and Fitoria's words. He also recruits Rishia into his party, who had attempted suicide by drowning after she was kicked out of Itsuki's party due to a false accusation against her. Sailing back to the mainland, Naofumi takes up Mirellia's reward: Lordship of Seyaette, with people Naofumi trusts to rebuild it. Raphtalia expresses her feeling that this is insurance should he die or go home, though Naofumi reveals it's his new beginning with them. As Naofumi and Raphtalia oversee her village rebuilding, the other Heroes resolve to become stronger than Naofumi. Meanwhile, Beloukas gains a secret new patron.

== Home media release ==
=== Japanese ===
Kadokawa Corporation (Japan – Region 2/A)
Box	Episodes	Release date	Ref.
1	1–7	April 24, 2019	
2	8–13	May 24, 2019	
3	14–19	June 26, 2019	
4	20–25	July 24, 2019	
Complete	1–25	March 30, 2022	

=== English ===
Funimation (North America – Region 1/A)
Part		Discs	Episodes	Release date	Ref.
Season 1	1	2 (BD); 2 (DVD)	1–13	May 26, 2020	
Season 1	2	2 (BD); 2 (DVD)	14–25	May 26, 2020	
Season 1	Complete	4 (BD)	1–25	November 2, 2021	
