= The Rising of the Shield Hero season 3 =

The Rising of the Shield Hero
- Season 3
- Key visual for the third season
- No. of episodes: 12

Release
- Original network: AT-X
- Original release: October 6 – December 22, 2023

Season chronology
- ← Previous; Season 2 Next → Season 4

The Rising of the Shield Hero is an anime television series based on the light novel series of the same name written by Aneko Yusagi. At 2019's Crunchyroll Expo, it was announced that the anime series would receive a second and third season. The third season is produced by Kinema Citrus and directed by Hitoshi Haga, with the rest of the main staff from the previous season returning. Alfredo Sirica and Natalie Jeffreys serve as additional music composers alongside Kevin Penkin for the season. It aired from October 6 to December 22, 2023, adapting volumes 10 to 12 of the light novel series. Crunchyroll streamed the English dub two weeks after the season's initial broadcast.

The opening theme song is "Sin", performed by Madkid, while the ending theme song is "Suki ni Natte wa Ikenai Riyū" (好きになってはいけない理由, lit. 'Reasons Why You Shouldn't Fall in Love'), performed by Chiai Fujikawa.

== Episodes ==
No. overall	No. in season	Title	Directed by	Written by	Chief animation directed by	Original release date
39	1	"The Dark Coliseum"; Transliteration: "Yami no Koroshiamu" (Japanese: 闇のコロシアム)	Hitoshi Haga	Keigo Koyanagi	Sana Komatsu	October 6, 2023
With the Spirit Tortoise's defeat, Naofumi prepares for the impending awakening of the Phoenix within the next few months. He learns from Queen Mirellia that after handling the last Wave while Naofumi was in the other world, the other three Heroes have gone missing. She also says the Seven Star Heroes are missing as well, with the only one they know about being the Staff Hero: disgraced King Aultcray (Trash). The Queen also warns Naofumi that Malty (Bitch) has disappeared too. Naofumi and his party visit slave trader Beloukas in order to free the demi-humans that came from Lurolona Village to bring them back home, only to learn most of them have been purchased already. He frees all the slaves he does have and follows a lead to the nation of Zeltoble to free more. He discovers an underground auction featuring demi-humans being sold at exorbitant prices, and is convinced to take part in an underground fighting arena in order to gain enough money to free them. Naofumi talks at a bar with a mysterious woman to learn about the rules, while watching a fight with a demi-human boy named Fohl who purposefully loses the match. Naofumi, Raphtalia, and Filo enter the arena under disguises, playing up the theatrics until they win the match.
40	2	"Nadia" (Japanese: ナディア)	Directed by : Motohiko Niwa; Storyboarded by : Hiroshi Yoneda	Keigo Koyanagi	Sana Komatsu & Yuka Kuroda	October 13, 2023
Naofumi is taken out for drinks by the mysterious woman, Nadia, when they are ambushed by several of their competitors who forfeited, who they easily deal with. Naofumi and his party restock on items at the local shop, where he gets acquainted with the famous merchant who runs it. With all the fighters forfeiting, the finals are set for Naofumi's team against Nadia. Using her lightning magic, she proves to be difficult for them to fight, even moreso when she transforms, revealing herself to be a killer whale demi-human. However, Raphtalia recognizes her, calling her "Sadeena", which causes her to stop and recognize both Raphtalia and Naofumi. Realizing his intentions to win the prize money to free the Lurolona slaves, which she was also doing, Sadeena throws the fight. But then, the sponsors stop Naofumi from winning, forcing them and Sadeena to team up against a new challenger, the mysterious "Murder Clown", who commands several puppets. Raphtalia and Filo fight it head on, while Naofumi and Sadeena cast a choral spell, granting Raphtalia an increase in power. She seemingly defeats the clown, but they escape using a dummy at the last moment. Murder Clown gives Naofumi vague warnings about the future before disappearing. The sponsors once again attempt to prevent Naofumi from winning his earnings, but the slave and shop merchants intervene, revealing his identity and backing them up. Meanwhile, Fohl picks up medicine which he takes to his gravely injured sister, Atla.
41	3	"The White Tiger Siblings"; Transliteration: "Hakuko no Kyōdai" (Japanese: ハクコの兄妹)	Directed by : Shunsuke Kishi; Storyboarded by : Masayuki Kojima	Takuya Asahina	Sana Komatsu, Yuka Kuroda & Franziska van Wulfen	October 20, 2023
Fohl and Atla are bought by Naofumi, who uses one of his potions to heal Atla. Naofumi returns to Seyaette with the freed demi-humans, making preparations to bolster their defenses, while Fohl helps his sister recover. One night, a group of slavers attack the village but Fohl uses a flare left by Naofumi to warn him and his party, who return in time to defeat the attackers and protect the children. As the enemies have ties to another noble, Naofumi is informed that he could neither arrest nor execute them and decides to make an example of them by selling them as slaves in Siltvelt. At the capital, Naofumi holds a ceremony at the Dragon Hourglass to reset Sadeena and Fohl's stats, welcoming them to his party. At the castle, they pass by Aultcray, who approaches Fohl and Atla, finding them familiar. Queen Mirellia tells Naofumi about Aultcray's days as the Staff Hero, how he used to be a renowned warrior and tactician, fighting for the sake of his younger sister, until her death left him vengeful and ruthless. She also reveals that they've discovered Motoyasu's whereabouts.
42	4	"The Operation to Capture the Spear Hero"; Transliteration: "Yari no Yūsha Hokaku Sakusen" (Japanese: 槍の勇者捕獲作戦)	Shunsuke Takarai	Akiko Waba	Sana Komatsu & Franziska van Wulfen	October 27, 2023
Alongside Motoyasu's resurgence, the Queen also reveals that Ren's companions were all killed, and that Myne is still missing. In Seyatte, Naofumi meets an unfamiliar girl named S'yne, who Filo recognizes as being Murder Clown. She asks to join the village but he kicks her out, unable to trust her. Naofumi, Raphtalia, and Filo head out to the nearby city where they find a down-trodden Motoyasu attempting to reunite with his old party member Elena. Naofumi tries to talk with him but he escapes, so he questions Elena about what happened. She revealed they went to attack the Spirit Tortoise first, but upon realizing Motoyasu wasn't strong enough to defeat it, they abandoned him. At a nearby tavern, Naofumi encounters Ren, whose party members all died when they tried to fight the Tortoise; however, he refuses to take responsibility and blames them for being too weak. Naofumi tries to reason with him, but it is all upended by the sudden arrival of Myne, who easily manipulates Ren into believing Naofumi to be the cause of everything, as well as claiming Motoyasu assaulted her too. She also reveals to have somehow blocked the influence of her slave crest. Ren goes mad and starts wildly attacking Naofumi, before escaping with Myne. As a result of being painfully rejected by Myne, Motoyasu drowns into a depressive spiral, until seeing Filo dancing rejuvenates his spirits. Now completely obsessed with Filo, Motoyasu begs Naofumi for her, so they knock him out and leave.
43	5	"Each of Their Paths"; Transliteration: "Sorezore no Michi" (Japanese: それぞれの道)	Directed by : Takanori Yamamoto; Storyboarded by : Hitoshi Haga	Momoka Toyoda	Sana Komatsu & Franziska van Wulfen	November 3, 2023
Naofumi, Raphtalia, and Filo leave Motoyasu behind and on their way back home, are attacked by a group of surprisingly powerful assailants. S'yne appears and helps the party to defeat them, with their bodies mysteriously disappearing. With Naofumi still suspicious of her, S'yne reveals that she is a vassal hero from a world that was previously destroyed and the enemies they fought had ties with those responsible, thus she wants to protect the other heroes to prevent the same from happening to their world. Despite still having some doubts, Naofumi takes S'yne in and sets to the Dragon Hourglass with some of the children who reached Level 40 to class up. Meanwhile, both Aultcray and Mirellia acknowledge that Atla has a striking resemblance with someone they know. Once back home, Naofumi learns from Eclair that a group of bandits appeared nearby and decides to hunt them down with his party, including Keel, Fohl, and Atla. Serving as bait for the bandits, Naofumi roams alone with Raph-chan until he comes across Motoyasu fighting a masked bandit, whom he recognizes as Ren.
44	6	"Where You Point Your Strength"; Transliteration: "Tsuyo-sa no Hokosaki" (Japanese: 強さの矛先)	Directed by : Motohiko Niwa; Storyboarded by : Youhei	Momoka Toyoda	Sana Komatsu, Yuka Kuroda & Franziska van Wulfen	November 10, 2023
Ren recalls when his party was wiped out by the Tortoise, with his knowledge from the video game he played in his old world proving insufficient. After running away with Myne, she betrays him and steals his equipment. This event, the townspeople chastising him for disappearing during the Tortoise's attack, and the otherworldly assailants trying to kill him spiral Ren into further madness, causing him to unlock his Curse series, and take on his bandit identity. In the present, Naofumi takes over the battle from Motoyasu, where Ren reveals his Greed and Gluttony abilities, ranting about his desire to become the strongest. The rest of the party members arrive and Eclair decides to fight Ren head-on, with her superior sword skills in conjunction with his erratic behaviour eventually allowing her to win the fight. The otherworldly assailants return to attack everyone, but Motoyasu effortlessly kills them, revealing his power increase as a result of taking Naofumi's advice, and Raphtalia destroys their souls to prevent them from reviving again. Eclair brings Ren back to his senses, saying she will help him find a purpose to get stronger, as he remembers dying in his old life protecting some girls from a knife attack.
45	7	"The Girl and the Dragon"; Transliteration: "Shōjo to Doragon" (Japanese: 少女とドラゴン)	Directed by : Min Kyung Hee; Storyboarded by : Hitoshi Haga	Ohine Ezaki	Sana Komatsu	November 17, 2023
Naofumi continues to care for the residents of Lurolona Village in preparation of the Phoenix's rising in two months, with Ren now having joined, training with Eclair. A woman named Ratotille Anthreya is sent by the Queen to the village to help them with monster breeding, after she was exiled from her hometown due to her experiments. They receive a package from Siltvelt which includes a dragon egg, and upon one of the demi-humans, Wyndia's, insistence, Naofumi agrees to raise it. He's forced to carry it around with him at all times in order to help with its growth, to his annoyance and everyone's amusement. Meanwhile, Atla continues to sleep in Naofumi's bed each night, irritating Fohl and Raphtalia. S'yne creates a doll using an accessory from the enemies from the other world to help communicate better with the others. The egg eventually hatches into a baby red dragon, which Wyndia names Gaelion. The two grow to become close, playing with the other demi-humans, though Gaelion wants to play with Naofumi. He ends up swallowing the jewel of the Emperor Dragon's Core, causing him to suddenly grow and evolve. He briefly attacks the others, before then flying off into the mountains.
46	8	"Dragon's Den"; Transliteration: "Ryū no Su" (Japanese: 竜の巣)	Directed by : Testuro Tanaka; Storyboarded by : Shingo Kaneko & Tetsuro Tanaka	Ohine Ezaki	Sana Komatsu, Yuka Kuroda & Franziska van Wulfen	November 24, 2023
As Naofumi and his party are about to head after Gaelion, they learn that Filo has started to be inflicted by the curse as a result of her previous connection to the zombie dragon. Atla is able to temporarily heal her, and Filo insists on joining on the journey. They arrive near the mountains, where the villagers that Naofumi previously saved from the dragon's plague tell him that Gaelion has taken residence in the Dragon's Den. On the trip up, Wyndia demonstrates her magic abilities, and Ren voices his regret over how he handled killing the original dragon. They enter the cave and confront the evolved Gaelion, only for Filo to suddenly arrive. Despite staying back to rest, the curse compels her to face the dragon, and is promptly swallowed by it. The party fights the dragon, eventually knocking it down, but before they can deliver a final blow, Wyndia stops them. She reveals that the dragon was her father, and while she initially detested the Heroes for killing him, she's grown to like Naofumi, and begs the dragon to return the body to Gaelion. Just then, the dragon evolves once again, as the Emperor Dragon from Kizuna's world takes control, declaring its desire to destroy everything and to take revenge against Kizuna. After knocking everyone out, the Dragon attacks Wyndia, forcing Naofumi to use his last remaining strength to attempt to defend her.
47	9	"Emperor Dragon"; Transliteration: "Ma Ryū" (Japanese: 魔竜)	Directed by : Takanori Yamamoto & Yuuto Ooizumi; Storyboarded by : Hiroshi Yoneda & Huang Jiawen	Ohine Ezaki	Sana Komatsu, Yuka Kuroda & Franziska van Wulfen	December 1, 2023
Naofumi barely survives the attack and Atla uses her special power to wound the Emperor Dragon, allowing the party to escape with their lives down the river. Once they regroup, Naofumi confirms that the Emperor Dragon will absorb Filo fully by sunrise unless they defeat it first, and comes with a plan to lure it out of its cave with his Shield of Wrath. Wyndia reveals to Atla and Fohl how she was raised by the dragon, also named Gaelion, after her father's death, until it was killed by Ren. Having finished their preparations, Naofumi lures the Emperor Dragon out, and while the rest of the party do what they can to keep dragon busy, Atla and Fohl are successfully able to finish the job, rescuing Filo and Gaelion. Wyndia says goodbye to her father, as they proceed to destroy the Emperor Dragon when it tries to flee, its essence returning to Naofumi's Shield. Naofumi chastises the villagers, realizing they manipulated Ren into killing the original Gaelion just to take his treasure; Ren apologizes to Wyndia and she forgives him. Naofumi discovers that the original Gaelion's soul now resides within Gaelion's body, but is told to not reveal the truth to Wyndia for her sake; he also discovers Filo's curse has been dispelled. Due to absorbing Filo's levels, Gaelion evolves and takes Naofumi and Wyndia for a ride, to Filo's great annoyance.
48	10	"Perfect Hidden Justice"; Transliteration: "Pāfekuto Haido Jasutisu" (Japanese: パーフェクト = ハイド = ジャスティス)	Directed by : Arisa Shima, Toshisuke Kishi & Akemi Kabata; Storyboarded by : Yusuke Kubo	Akiko Waba	Sana Komatsu, Yuka Kuroda & Franziska van Wulfen	December 8, 2023
Naofumi excuses Melty from her duties in order to help Filo regain her levels, as well as let herself level up too. S'yne is revealed to have been taking part in underground fights for extra money, and tells the group about one of the fighters, an archer known as "Perfect Hidden Justice", who Naofumi, Ren, and Rishia realize its Itsuki. The party, accompanied with several demi-humans, enter the stadium where Rishia finds Itsuki. They confront him, but he refuses to listen to them, revealing to also have been manipulated by Myne like Ren was, and insisting on what he is doing is right. After seeing him fight in the stadium, Rishia says she wants to fight him in order to get him to listen while also showing him how much she's grown. Meanwhile, it's revealed after failing to defeat the Tortoise, Itsuki's party abandoned him, but have since returned alongside Myne, manipulating him into competing in the underground fights under the pretence of using the money to buy and free slaves. They learn that Naofumi is nearby and secretly scheme how to deal with Itsuki. With help from the slave merchant, Naofumi's party lure Itsuki into a private arena, where Rishia is able to confront him alone and fight.
49	11	"Justice VS Justice"; Transliteration: "Seigi tai Seigi" (Japanese: 正義 VS 正義)	Daiki Yonemori	Akiko Waba	Sana Komatsu, Yuka Kuroda & Franziska van Wulfen	December 15, 2023
Itsuki realizes Naofumi's plan, and wanting to punish him for his supposed crimes, attacks him with his new "Justice Bow", effected by the Curse of Pride. Itsuki declares his version of "justice" and his intent to rid evil, revealing his bow's new power and its capability to brainwash others. Rishia stands firm and fights Itsuki, demonstrating her significant growth, causing Itsuki to let himself become further corrupted by the curse series. However, when he tries to attack Rishia with the bow, the energy from the ki manifests into Rishia's hand as a translucent weapon, surprising everyone as they realize even the bow is rejecting Itsuki's "justice". Rishia promptly uses the new weapon to defeat Itsuki. He reflects back on his past life, how he always wanted to become a hero and got into a prestigious high school, however was placed into the lowest class where he soon fell into a depression due to his insecurities. Refusing to accept his loss and remembering Myne's words, believing her to be the only one who still believes in him, he runs back to her, only to discover that she and his old party abandoned him, taking the money and leaving behind a load of debt for him. Itsuki passes out in exhaustion, but awakens in Lurolona, where Rishia helps him slowly recover.
50	12	"The Ones We Must Protect"; Transliteration: "Mamorubeki Mono-tachi" (Japanese: 守るべき者達)	Directed by : Wataru Arakawa; Storyboarded by : Yoshiaki Okumura	Keigo Koyanagi	Sana Komatsu, Yuka Kuroda & Franziska van Wulfen	December 22, 2023
Naofumi and Raphtalia start training with Sadeena and Gaelion to tap into the power of the Dragon Veins to increase their abilities. Some time later, they are visited by Erhard, who delivers some supplies, among them being a new priestess garb Naofumi ordered for Raphtalia. After she wears it, however, she is suddenly attacked by some unknown assailants, who are resistant to the heroes' attacks. Naofumi and Raphtalia use the power of the Dragon Vein to confuse them, allowing everyone in the village to defeat them, while the enemies resort to a suicide bombing. Sadeena reveals that Raphtalia is a descendant of the royal family of Q'ten Lo, an isolated nation, with Sadeena protecting her and her parents since they took refuge in Lurolona, fleeing from the dispute for the throne. She also reveals the garb is perceived by the assassins as a declaration of contesting for the throne, which prompted their attack and affirms that they will not rest until she is killed. Enraged by their insistence to get rid of Raphtalia, even after she declares having no interest in the throne, Naofumi decides to confront the empire of Q'Ten Lo, and willing to fight if he has to. While Naofumi informs the Queen of his plans, Atla and Fohl approach a nearby Aultcray, who is shaken upon talking to them. Having completed his task to assemble the four heroes, Naofumi decides to solve the dispute with Q'ten Lo as fast as possible so they can concentrate on their imminent fight with the Phoenix, which will awaken in two months, and departs with Wyndia and Gaelion ahead to Siltvelt to arrange a transport there for his party.

== Home media release ==
=== Japanese ===
Kadokawa Corporation (Japan – Region 2/A)
Vol.	Episodes	Release date	Ref.
1	1–4	January 24, 2024	
2	5–8	February 28, 2024	
3	9–12	March 27, 2024	

=== English ===
Crunchyroll LLC (North America – Region 1/A)
Season	Discs	Episodes	Regular edition release date	Limited edition release date	Ref.
3	2 (BD); 2 (DVD)	1–12	February 25, 2025		
