= Dimension Wave =

Japanese light novel series

- First light novel volume cover

ディメンションウェーブ (Dimenshon Uēbu)
- Genre: Adventure; Fantasy; Slice of life
- Novel series
- Written by: Aneko Yusagi
- Published by: Shōsetsuka ni Narō
- Original run: October 13, 2012 – present
- Light novel
- Written by: Aneko Yusagi
- Illustrated by: Ryō Ueda
- Published by: Shufunotomo
- English publisher: NA: J-Novel Club
- Imprint: Hero Bunko
- Original run: December 27, 2019 – present
- Volumes: 7
- Manga
- Written by: Aneko Yusagi
- Illustrated by: Ichiko Kameyoshi
- Published by: Kadokawa Shoten
- Magazine: KadoComi
- Original run: October 15, 2024 – present
- Volumes: 1

Dimension Wave (ディメンションウェーブ, Dimenshon Uēbu) is a Japanese light novel series written by Aneko Yusagi and illustrated by Ryō Ueda. It initially began serialization on the user-generated novel publishing website Shōsetsuka ni Narō in October 2012. It was later acquired by Shufunotomo who began publishing it under their Hero Bunko imprint in December 2019. A manga adaptation illustrated by Ichiko Kameyoshi began serialization on Kadokawa Corporation's KadoComi manga website in October 2024.

== Synopsis ==
Kizuna has just won the opportunity to participate in the second wave of the virtual reality MMO (VRMMORPG) game Dimension Wave, a game that lets people experience years of gameplay in 24 real-time hours. Inspired by his sisters' participation in the first wave, Kizuna is excited by the opportunity, but then discovers that his sisters played a trick on him by making his character a girl with the name "Kizuna†Exceed". Kizuna decides to not let it bother him and focus on fishing alongside his sisters Kanade and Tsumugi, and other people they meet in the game.

== Media ==
=== Light novel ===
Written by Aneko Yusagi, Dimension Wave initially began serialization on the user-generated novel publishing website Shōsetsuka ni Narō on October 13, 2012. It was later acquired by Shufunotomo who began publishing the series with illustrations by Ryō Ueda under their Hero Bunko light novel imprint on December 27, 2019. Seven volumes have been released as of September 30, 2024.

During their panel at Anime NYC 2024, J-Novel Club announced that they had licensed the series for English publication.

No.	Original release date	Original ISBN	North American release date	North American ISBN
1	December 27, 2019	978-4-07-441900-5	November 21, 2024	978-1-71-837074-6
Prologue; Chapter 1: "The Dismantling Knife and the Worn-Out Rod"; Chapter 2: "Herring and Dismantling"; Chapter 3: "Altorese the Merchant"; Chapter 4: "Revenge and Results"; Chapter 5: "Spirit of Glass"; Chapter 6: "The Second City"; Chapter 7: "The Shadow That Crawls from the Dark"; Chapter 8: "An Efficient and Lucrative Spot with No Competition"; Chapter 9: "On to the Great Blue"; Chapter 10: "A Small Mistake, a Large Experience"; Chapter 11: "Dimension Wave Kicks Off"; Chapter 12: "The Frontliners"; Chapter 13: "Defensive Battle"; Chapter 14: "Dimension Wave Complete"
2	March 20, 2020	978-4-07-443499-2	February 6, 2025	978-1-71-837076-0
Prologue: "The Plank of Death"; Chapter 1: "Merchant of Death"; Chapter 2: "The Sea of No Return"; Chapter 3: "Limited Dimension Wave"; Chapter 4: "Enter the Gimmick! An Enemy to Protect, An Enemy to Defeat"; Chapter 5: "Limited Dimension Wave Clear"; Chapter 6: "Seven Tools of the Pioneer"; Chapter 7: "Enter Development"; Chapter 8: "Pekkle Life"; Chapter 9: "Second Dimension Wave Complete"; Chapter 10: "Master and Disciple"; Chapter 11: "New Land"; Chapter 12: "Mistake"; Chapter 13: "Impromptu Dungeon Diving"; Chapter 14: "The Lord of the Pond"; Chapter 15: "Tribal Style"; Chapter 16: "The Battle for the Lake"; Chapter 17: "Underground Fishing Log"
3	March 21, 2021	978-4-07-447280-2	April 24, 2025	978-1-71-837078-4
4	September 30, 2021	978-4-07-449734-8	July 10, 2025	978-1-71-837080-7
5	April 28, 2022	978-4-07-450832-7	October 7, 2025	978-1-71-837082-1
6	September 30, 2022	978-4-07-453256-8	December 30, 2025	978-1-71-837084-5
7	September 30, 2024	978-4-07-460492-0	April 23, 2026	978-1-7183-7086-9

=== Manga ===
A manga adaptation was announced on January 4, 2020. The manga adaptation illustrated by Ichiko Kameyoshi began serialization on Kadokawa Corporation's KadoComi website on October 15, 2024. The manga's chapters have been compiled into a single tankōbon volume as of January 2026.

No.	Release date	ISBN
1	January 7, 2026	978-4-04-811539-1

=== Other ===
In commemoration of the release of fifth novel volume on April 28, 2022, a promotional video with narration from Vtuber Shirakami Fubuki was uploaded to the Hero Bunko YouTube channel that same day.
