= Demetrios (video game) =

2016 point-and-click video game

Demetrios - The BIG Cynical Adventure
- Developer: COWCAT Games
- Publisher: COWCAT Games: EU: Red Sky Games (Physical PSVITA/PS4 release)
- Composers: Fabrice Breton, Alfredo Sirica, James Thorley
- Engine: GameMaker: Studio
- Platforms: Mac OS X, Microsoft Windows, Linux, Nintendo Switch, PlayStation Vita, PlayStation 4, Xbox One, PlayStation 5
- Release: Windows, Mac OS X, Linux: WW: May 31, 2016; PlayStation Vita: WW: December 6, 2016; EU: December 28, 2018; (Limited physical release); Xbox One and PlayStation 4: EU: August 1, 2017; WW: August 2, 2017; EU: December 28, 2018; (Limited physical PS4 release) Nintendo Switch: WW: December 3, 2018; JP: January 14, 2021; PlayStation 5: WW: March 8, 2022
- Genre: Point and click
- Mode: Single-player

Demetrios - The BIG Cynical Adventure is a point and click adventure game for the Mac OS X, Microsoft Windows, and Linux platforms. The game was developed and published by the independent French studio COWCAT Games and was released on May 31, 2016. It features hand drawn art and is the first commercial release by Fabrice Breton. It was released later (December 6, 2016) for PlayStation Vita. A physical release for the PlayStation Vita and PlayStation 4 of the game was published by Red Sky Games in Europe. On August 1st, 2017, the game was released on the Xbox Store. A Nintendo Switch port of the game was released worldwide on December 3, 2018, on the Nintendo eShop, followed by a Japanese localization release of the game on January 14, 2021. A remastered version with 4K assets and improved colors was released on March 8, 2022 for the PlayStation 5.

== Plot ==
One night Bjorn Thonen, an antique dealer from Paris, Shmaris, is robbed after coming home drunk. A certain stone tablet was stolen and Bjorn is forced to conduct his own investigation. He gets help from his neighbor Sandra and her daughter Caroline. They travel to the fictional country of Nogo where they learn more about the tablet and the ancient legends about King Demetrios. They have to find all stone tablets in order to save the world.

== Gameplay ==
The player has to solve puzzles and find objects to advance in the game. Some objects can be combined and have to be used in certain places to advance. The player can also interact with other characters and choose among some dialog options and show them collected items. With the help of a map, the player can travel to different locations to find clues and solve puzzles.

== Development ==
Between 1999 and 2001, Fabrice Breton already created the first prototype of the game, which was never released. In 2014, he began working on the remake, which was financed through a crowdfunding campaign on Kickstarter in October 2015 with the game receiving €4,245 surpassing the goal of €2,500. It was developed with GameMaker: Studio. The game is inspired by adventure game classics such as Broken Sword, Discworld and Phoenix Wright. Although being developed by a French studio, the game was written in English first and later translated into French, Spanish, German, and Italian.

=== Replastered ===
A remastered version of Demetrios with the subtitle Replastered released on March 8, 2022 for the PlayStation 5. It contains 4K assets and improved colors. These graphical changes were added to the PC version on May 31st, 2026.

== Reception ==
Reception

Aggregate scores
Aggregator	Score
GameRankings	69.10%
Metacritic	72/100

Demetrios received mixed to positive reception by video game critics, resulting in an averaged Metacritic score of 72/100 based on 14 reviews. Adventure-Treff praised the German translation and said the game's texts are similar to visual novels, while cricitizing the lack of voice acting. Just Adventure gave a B rating and said, "There's enough diversity within the game to hold the interest of most players."
