= The Rising of the Shield Hero season 2 =

The Rising of the Shield Hero
- Season 2
- Logo for the second season
- No. of episodes: 13

Release
- Original network: AT-X
- Original release: April 6 – June 29, 2022

Season chronology
- ← Previous; Season 1 Next → Season 3

The Rising of the Shield Hero is an anime television series based on the light novel series of the same name written by Aneko Yusagi. At 2019's Crunchyroll Expo, it was announced that the anime series would receive a second and third season. Masato Jinbo replaced Takao Abo as director, with the rest of the main staff members from the previous season returning and production by Kinema Citrus and DR Movie. During "Kadokawa Light Novel Expo 2020", it was revealed that the second season was originally set to premiere in October 2021, but it was later delayed by 6 months. The second season aired from April 6 to June 29, 2022, on AT-X and other networks. It ran for 13 episodes, adapting volumes 6 to 9 of the light novel series. Crunchyroll streamed the English dub one month after the season's initial broadcast.

The opening theme song is "Bring Back", performed by Madkid, while the ending theme song is "Yuzurenai" (ゆずれない, lit. 'I Can't Give Up'), performed by Chiai Fujikawa.

== Episodes ==
Note: All episodes from this season were written by Keigo Koyanagi.

No. overall	No. in season	Title	Directed by	Chief animation directed by	Original release date
26	1	"A New Roar"; Transliteration: "Arata na Hōkō" (Japanese: 新たな咆哮)	Directed by : Masato Jinbo; Storyboarded by : Masato Jinbo & Mayu Hirotomi	Masahiro Suwa	April 6, 2022
Naofumi continues to watch over Seyaette, as well as oversee Rishia's training, who struggles to keep up due to her low base stats. They are suddenly attacked by bat familiars, and while Raphtalia and Filo easily dispose of them, Naofumi becomes perturbed when the countdown for the Waves stops. He and the other Heroes are summoned to Queen Mirellia, who reveals that a beast known as the "Spirit Tortoise" has awakened and has begun its rampage through several territories, asking for their assistance. The other Heroes hastily decline and leave, with Naofumi the only one to accept. Rishia continues to feel distraught over not being good enough for Itsuki, so Raphtalia suggests also becoming Naofumi's slave so she can gain his EXP boost; she's reluctant but ultimately agrees. As the party travels to the Spirit Tortoise Kingdom, Filo communicates with Fitoria, reminding Naofumi of the Heroes fate should they refuse to work together. Reaching the Kingdom, they overhear from civilians that the three Heroes were supposedly killed by the Tortoise, but Fitoria confirms they're still alive. They're then attacked by more incoming tortoise familiars, with Naofumi forced to unleash his Wrath Shield to finish them off. In the aftermath, they're approached by a hooded woman, who tells him to kill her.
27	2	"Footprints of the Spirit Tortoise"; Transliteration: "Reiki no Ashiato" (Japanese: 霊亀の足跡)	Takahiro Hirata	Kōta Sera	April 13, 2022
After the hooded woman disappears, Naofumi and the Queen meet up with the generals of the surrounding nations to discuss their plan to deal with the Spirit Tortoise. They reveal that the Seven Star Heroes, people who possess vassal weapons, have been called upon to assist, but may not make it within the three days until the Tortoise wakes back up. They are then approached by the hooded woman, revealing herself to be Ost Hourai, the Regent of the Spirit Tortoise Kingdom, and in actuality, the familiar of the Spirit Tortoise itself. She reveals her plan was to integrate into society, to collect souls for the Spirit Tortoise, which he can use to permanently stop the Waves, however he's been prematurely awoken and being controlled by an unknown party, so Ost has sought everyone's help to destroy it. The generals start to argue amongst each other over who should be in charge, causing Naofumi to storm out in annoyance. Later that night, Raphtalia convinces Naofumi they are merely worried of protecting their territories, just like him, and suggests he take charge by coming up with a plan themselves. They plan to lure the Tortoise out by dispersing the large armies around the area, while Naofumi and his party, accompanied by Ost and swordswoman Eclair Seyatte, prepare to fight the Tortoise.
28	3	"Shaking Land"; Transliteration: "Yureru Daichi" (Japanese: 揺れる大地)	Directed by : Tomonori Mine; Storyboarded by : Kahoru Fujiki	Masahiro Suwa	April 20, 2022
The Spirit Tortoise awakens as the armies prepare their assault. Eclair leads the main army to distract and intercept the Tortoise, while Naofumi, his party, and Ost lure away the incoming familiars. Naofumi also fashions his cart with a Shield Hero flag which inspires the soldiers. Ost uses her control over the familiars to freeze them in place, allowing Naofumi and his party to dispatch them with ease. However, after luring it into a canyon, the armies have trouble keeping the Tortoise at bay, losing over half their manpower, so the commander of the Spirit Tortoise Kingdom sacrifices himself to activate explosives, trapping the Tortoise in the canyon. But then, the Tortoise unleashes its magic power that start to decimate the armies with its long-range attacks. While they scramble, Naofumi orders the second phase of the plan, which is for the magic-users to unleash a "Judgment" attack, blasting the side of the Tortoise's neck. Naofumi, empowered by Ost, and Raphtalia and Filo, empowered by Rishia, pierce through the wound hard enough until the Tortoise's head is sliced off. The group mourn over Ost, who was to disappear after the Tortoise's death, but seeing her still there causes them to realize the Tortoise is still alive.
29	4	"Ruins in the Fog"; Transliteration: "Muchū no Iseki" (Japanese: 霧中の遺跡)	Mayu Hirotomi	Kōta Sera	April 27, 2022
At night, Rishia explains how she was taken away from her family by nobles to "pay off" her parents' debts, until she was saved by Itsuki, inspiring her to join his party. The following day, Naofumi and his party travel onto the back of the Spirit Tortoise to find a way to stop it from reviving. During this time, Ost learns that many of the soldiers are thankful for her help in saving their lives, causing her to feel guilty due to her true purpose as the Tortoise's familiar. While resting, Ost helps to cheer up a distraught Rishia, reminding her of her new role in the Shield Hero's party. The group then discover the ruins of a massacred town on the Tortoise's back, as well as a temple where Rishia is able to read the inscriptions about the Spirit Tortoise. They then discover some faded Japanese text from an older Hero, which Naofumi reads, mentioning the Tortoise's seal. Just as the temple collapses, Ost remembers the way to destroy the Tortoise for good is to destroy its heart inside the body, which they can enter through a cave. As the group prepares to split up, Rishia insists on joining Naofumi and his party, which they accept. Inside, they come across three adventurers who claim to have been sent on the Queen's orders, but finding it fishy, Naofumi gets Raphtalia to unveil their disguises, revealing them to be L'Arc, Therese, and Glass.
30	5	"Ost Hourai"; Transliteration: "Osuto Hōrai" (Japanese: オスト＝ホウライ)	Takahiro Hirata	Masahiro Suwa	May 4, 2022
L'Arc reveals to the group that they don't intend on fighting them and are instead there to deal with the person who woke up the Spirit Tortoise. He suggests a truce with Naofumi to take him down, but he bluntly refuses, not wanting to work with people he'll have to fight later, so they go their separate ways. As they continue their trek, an increasingly guilty Ost is comforted by Rishia and Raphtalia, reminding her that despite her initial purpose, they're comrades now. They reach the Spirit Tortoise's heart where they're confronted by an illusion of the man responsible for everything, Kyo Ethnina, wielder of the Book Vassal Weapon, who attempts to taunt Naofumi by offhandedly mentioning the other three Heroes. The group successfully destroy the Tortoise's heart, however Ost still doesn't disappear, leading to further confusion. While the Queen readies her forces to halt the regenerating Tortoise, Ost, now having fully regained her memories, takes the party to the inner depths of the Tortoise. They encounter the real Kyo at the base of the operations, who mocks them for not taking the easy route to stop the Tortoise by simply killing Ost, as it turns out she's not merely a familiar, but a physical manifestation of the Spirit Tortoise itself.
31	6	"Racing to Catch Up"; Transliteration: "Okkake" (Japanese: 追駆)	Directed by : Takuma Suzuki; Storyboarded by : Masayuki Kojima, Tomoko Hiramuki & Takuma Suzuki	Kōta Sera & Masahiro Suwa	May 11, 2022
With the Spirit Tortoise revived, its core is shielded up, meaning its head and heart must be destroyed again to kill it. The Tortoise is about to attack the Queen and her army when Fitoria appears to deal with it herself, planning to take out its head while the army escapes. Meanwhile, Kyo reveals to Naofumi's party he captured the other three Heroes and have been using their holy weapons as an extra power source to control the Tortoise. L'Arc and his team soon arrive and join Naofumi's party in fighting Kyo, but he uses the Tortoise's gravity magic to pin them all to the ground. He beats up and berates Naofumi over his uselessness, when surprisingly Rishia, due to her inherent ability to master ki, is able to resist the gravity spell and fights Kyo on even terms. Ost grants the power of the Spirit Tortoise to Naofumi, allowing him to break free everyone of Kyo's control, while Ost sends L'Arc's group and Filo to destroy the heart. Rishia frees the Heroes from their containment, while the head and heart are successfully destroyed at the same time. Despite this, Kyo executes his backup plan to shield the core with his remaining soul magic. Expecting this, Naofumi plans to finish him off with the Shield of Wrath, but finds himself unable to use it due to not carrying the hatred required. This however allows Naofumi to unlock the Spirit Tortoise Heart Shield, and Ost forcefully uses it to destroy the core, killing the Tortoise. Kyo escapes to his world with the remaining soul energy, and a dying Ost gives Naofumi and his party the ability to travel and follow after him. As she dies, she hopes she'll be reborn as their comrade, while the Tortoise's remains bring life back to the wastelands.
32	7	"Infinite Labyrinth"; Transliteration: "Mugenmeikyū" (Japanese: 無限迷宮)	Ippei Ichii	Kōta Sera & Masahiro Suwa	May 18, 2022
Naofumi, Rishia, and a de-aged Raphtalia wake up in a cell, discovering that all their stats have gone down back to Lv. 1. After leaving the unlocked prison, they find themselves on an eerie island with no way out, with Naofumi unable to track Filo's location. The three fight low level monsters to gain EXP, but find trouble when a kappa appears too strong for Raphtalia and Rishia to fight, seriously injuring Naofumi. They are then rescued by a girl named Kizuna Kazayama, who introduces herself as one of the four Cardinal Heroes of her world, the Hunting Hero, summoned from Japan just like Naofumi. She tells them that she's been trapped in the "Infinite Labyrinth" for years, imprisoned by an enemy country, and unaware of what the Waves are. Naofumi becomes suspicious of her after learning she's friends with L'Arc and Glass, but after revealing as the Hunting Hero she can't harm people, he decides to trust her. Naofumi states his desire to escape, while Kizuna informs him of the struggles and despair she felt attempting to do so. She shows the group an exposed opening where she believes to be the edge of the labyrinth, something her and Naofumi akin to a "bug" in a game. Taking advantage of this, Naofumi gets Kizuna to create a bioplant that he unleashes on the room, destroying it and forcefully opening up the "bug" in the wall, allowing the four of them to enter it. They all re-emerge on the outside, as Kizuna excitedly and tearfully thanks everyone now that she's returned to her world.
33	8	"A Parting in the Snow"; Transliteration: "Yuki no Wakare" (Japanese: 雪の別れ)	Directed by : Min Sun Kim; Storyboarded by : Hideaki Uehara	Masahiro Suwa, Kōta Sera & Jin Woo Woo	May 25, 2022
With their options limited and the next Wave ten days away, Kizuna suggests travelling to her summoned country of Sikul for help. However, due to needing to cross several borders to do so, she suggests an alternative, using the Dragon Hourglass in the capital of Mikakage, the city they're currently in, to use her "Return Codex" skill to teleport them all there. While waiting in town to grind for EXP and obtain money, Kizuna introduces Naofumi to the many different inhabitants of the world, including demi-humans known as the "Grass", the "Jewel" people, and "Spirits", who possess incredible spirit energy. Learning how valuable his SP recovery items are to the Spirits, he utilizes his businessman skills and shrewd-ish tactics in order to sell them all, giving them enough money for travel passes and new outfits. Later, they learn of a man who has been doing experiments on the Hourglass that will allow normal people to teleport rather than just the Heroes, however it doesn't turn out to be Kyo like they expected. As it starts to snow, Raphtalia suggests using the opportunity to sneak into the capital, only for it to turn out to be a trap, forcing them to fight their way through the guards. They reach the Hourglass, confronted by the man, Kazuki, and while Kizuna is able to reach and activate the Hourglass no problem, Raphtalia isn't affected. The voice of Kyo mockingly reveals he left Raphtalia with Naofumi so he could snatch her away at this moment, as she stands her guard to fight Kazuki, while Naofumi is forcefully teleported away to his horror.
34	9	"Humming Fairy"; Transliteration: "Hamingu Fērī" (Japanese: ハミングフェーリー)	Marina Maki	Masahiro Suwa	June 1, 2022
Arriving in Sikul, Naofumi demands Kizuna return them to rescue Raphtalia, but she finds the location has been locked preventing them from teleporting, further enraging Naofumi. Kizuna introduces them to the people of Sikul, who react in apprehension upon learning Naofumi's from another world, to her confusion. Naofumi then meets Ethnobalt, the wielder of the Boat Vassal Weapon and an ancient rabbit beast similar to Fitoria, who is good with tracking down people. In order to find Raphtalia, Ethnobalt creates a shikigami for Naofumi out of Raphtalia's hair, which results in a small tanuki creature to accompany them. Her and Kizuna's shikigami, Chris, locate Raphtalia and Glass in Raybul, enemy territory where Kazuki resides, so with Ethnobalt's help, they quickly and secretly travel there to track them down. However once they arrive, Naofumi ends up shockingly finding Filo, who since being separated had been captured and abused by a slaver, forced to put on live performances. The fury he feels at seeing her treatment causes the Shield of Wrath to re-emerge in Naofumi's heart, but Rishia helps calm him down, so they can stealthily rescue her during the night. They successfully free Filo, who due to filolials not existing in this world takes on the form of a humming bird, and promptly torture her slaver for revenge and information. After reuniting, Filo names the tanuki "Raph-chan", and Kizuna learns that the Mirror Vassal Weapon wielder has gone missing. Just then, Naofumi starts to freak out when Raphtalia's stats in his drop menu suddenly disappear. Meanwhile, Raphtalia is taken to a mansion in the frozen mountains.
35	10	"Katana Hero"; Transliteration: "Katana no Yūsha" (Japanese: 刀の勇者)	Takahiro Hirata	Masahiro Suwa & Kōta Sera	June 8, 2022
Raphtalia is thrown into a prison cell alongside L'Arc, Therese, and Glass, who themselves ended up there due to Kyo's trap re-entering their world. After she tells them about meeting and rescuing Kizuna from the Infinite Labyrinth, Raphtalia uses her illusionary magic to allow them to steal a talisman from a guard, giving Glass the power to let them escape. The four plan to make their way to Sikul, with Therese selling some of her jewels to give them money for new clothes, food, and weapons. They then stumble across a ceremony where the new Katana Vassal Weapon Hero will be declared, with Raphtalia realizing it's Kazuki about to claim the katana, when suddenly, it vanishes and reappears in her hands. Due to being unable to remove the Vassal Weapon, similar to the Holy Weapons of the Cardinal Heroes, Raphtalia makes a break for it on her own, leaving L'Arc's group behind, while Kazuki's guards give chase. Raphtalia finds herself unsure what to do as her slave crest disappears and her body suddenly ages up to normal. She ends up in front of the temple of a clan who serve the Katana Hero, who re-dresses her in the Hero's traditional garb, regaining her confidence. She faces down Kazuki outside, where he siccs two copies of the Holy Beast Byakko on her that she easily dispatches. She then slices Kazuki's stomach with a special move, telling him not to move or else he'll die, leaving while he begs her to return the katana to him. Eventually her energy is drained, just as a giant Byakko copy appears, fearing this is her end, until she is rescued by Naofumi, Filo, Rishia, and Kizuna, who destroy the copy. She thanks everyone, while happily telling Naofumi she's returned.
36	11	"Kizuna" (Japanese: 絆)	Directed by : Jeong Hee Yang & Yang Ho Ji; Storyboarded by : Ippei Ichii	Masahiro Suwa & Jin Woo Woo	June 15, 2022
After Raphtalia's reunion with her party, Kizuna is reunited with Glass, L'Arc, and Therese. At the same time, Kyo visits and taunts the still stunned Kazuki, resulting in him moving and being cut in half. His two companions mourn his death, while a green-haired woman appears before Kyo, saying she'll eliminate their threats. While traveling back to Sikul, Kizuna learns Glass' party's plan to kill the Cardinal Heroes of Naofumi's world to stop the Waves, berating them over the foolish decision. Even when Naofumi suggests there may not be another way to stop the Waves without fighting, Kizuna remains adamant to do whatever she can to find some way to stop it without needing to. It's also at this time Naofumi learns that L'Arc is the young King of Sikul. Elsewhere, Kyo puts the body of Kazuki into a stasis chamber, while his two companions ask him for more power for revenge. After the party visits the blacksmith Romina for armor upgrades, they are suddenly attacked by the green-haired woman, Yomogi Emarl, intending to kill the Heroes for Kyo. She is immediately overpowered by the party, when her sword begins to take on a mind of its own and start to absorb Yomogi, so the party successfully breaks it free as it explodes. Surrendered, Yomogi claims that Kyo is doing everything in order to stop the Waves, so Kizuna takes her to her house to interrogate. Yomogi reveals that she and Kyo were childhood friends, and after seeing Naofumi's visceral reaction towards Kyo, she wants to uncover the truth and have him to atone for his crimes. The next day as the party suits up to take on Kyo, the Waves abruptly activate, teleporting Kizuna, Yomogi, Glass, L'Arc, and Therese away from Naofumi and his party. Ending up in front of Kyo's laboratory, Yomogi devastatingly realizes Kyo wasn't trying to stop the Waves, but create his own.
37	12	"Reason to Fight"; Transliteration: "Tatakau Riyū" (Japanese: 戦う理由)	Daigo Yamagishi	Masahiro Suwa & Kōta Sera	June 22, 2022
It is revealed that Kyo was a shut-in gamer before committing suicide and reincarnating in the other world, where he decided to indulge in his desires. With the Waves in progress, Ethnobolt and Yomogi arrive to pick up Naofumi and his party to take them to Kyo's laboratory, while Kizuna's party deal with the Wave. Inside the group is attacked by Kazuki's subordinates, who have been transformed into half-animal chimeras, but are swiftly disposed of by Raphtalia, while the exploding sword is blocked by Naofumi. Kyo then reveals that he has "resurrected" Kazuki's body using the soul of the Mirror Vassal Weapon wielder, sending him to attack the party. Naofumi and Rishia go ahead to face Kyo while the rest stay back to deal with "Kazuki". Kyo laughs and taunts at Naofumi, further and further enraging him to the point that he allows the Shield of Wrath to completely consume him. Rishia attempts to calm him down but the possessed Naofumi nearly kills her, berating her for her uselessness. Rishia manages to get through to him reminding him of his true feelings for Raphtalia and Filo, and fights Kyo. Thanks to the soul of Ost, followed by a returned Raphtalia and Filo, Naofumi regains his composure, annoying Kyo. Using the Spirit Tortoise Shield, combined with the Mirror Vassal Weapon, Naofumi shoots a beam of energy that overpowers Kyo's, finally defeating him in an explosion. In the aftermath, Naofumi and his party are teleported back to the world, saying their quick goodbyes to Kizuna and everyone. Back in Melromarc, Naofumi is awarded for defeating the Spirit Tortoise, learning the other Cardinal Heroes managed to handle the Wave in his absence.
38	13	"Flowers Offered in Recollection"; Transliteration: "Tsuioku no Kenka" (Japanese: 追憶の献花)	Directed by : Muneki Ogasawara, Sakumi Inoha, Masatsugu Arakawa & Daigo Yamagishi; Storyboarded by : Masayuki Kojima, Yōhei, Shingo Kaneko, Daigo Yamagishi & Sakumi Inoha	Masahiro Suwa, Kōta Sera & Ga Young Park	June 29, 2022
Naofumi, Raphtalia, Filo, and Rishia go out to travel early one morning. While taking a rest stop to fish, Filo laments no longer being able to fly like she could in the other world. Raphtalia and Rishia proceed to reminisce about the time when Kizuna initially took them to get new outfits. Noticing Raphtalia wanted to impress Naofumi, Kizuna got Rishia to help her to try on a bunch of different clothes. After picking her choice, Raphtalia tried to ask Naofumi who has the best, but he simply said his was, causing Kizuna to note his denseness. Meanwhile in the other world, Kizuna and Yomogi are also fishing, with Kizuna telling Yomogi stories about Naofumi. Yomogi asks to tell her about her time in the Infinite Labyrinth, so Kizuna explains all she did to survive throughout the years, to fight her suicidal thoughts, until Naofumi eventually arrived. Yomogi starts to voice her concerns regarding her memories of Kyo, so Kizuna tells her to remember all the happy times they had, leading her to recall a humorous moment between them shortly before the Spirit Tortoise incident, putting her mind at ease. As Naofumi's party continues travelling, Rishia starts to think about a conversation they had with Ost, sparking embarrassing memories out of Raphtalia, as Ost had explained to her and Filo what it meant to "get intimate" with someone. Naofumi's party finally reach their destination, the spot of the Spirit Tortoise's demise, where they are to pay their respects to Ost. Before leaving, Naofumi sees the spirit of Ost as the two smile to each other.

== Home media release ==
=== Japanese ===
Kadokawa Corporation (Japan – Region 2/A)
Vol.	Episodes	Release date	Ref.
1	1–4	July 27, 2022	
2	5–8	August 24, 2022	
3	9–13	September 28, 2022	

=== English ===
Crunchyroll LLC (North America – Region 1/A)
Season	Discs	Episodes	Regular edition release date	Limited edition release date	Ref.
2	2 (BD); 2 (DVD)	1–13	August 29, 2023		
