= Kevin Penkin =

Australian composer

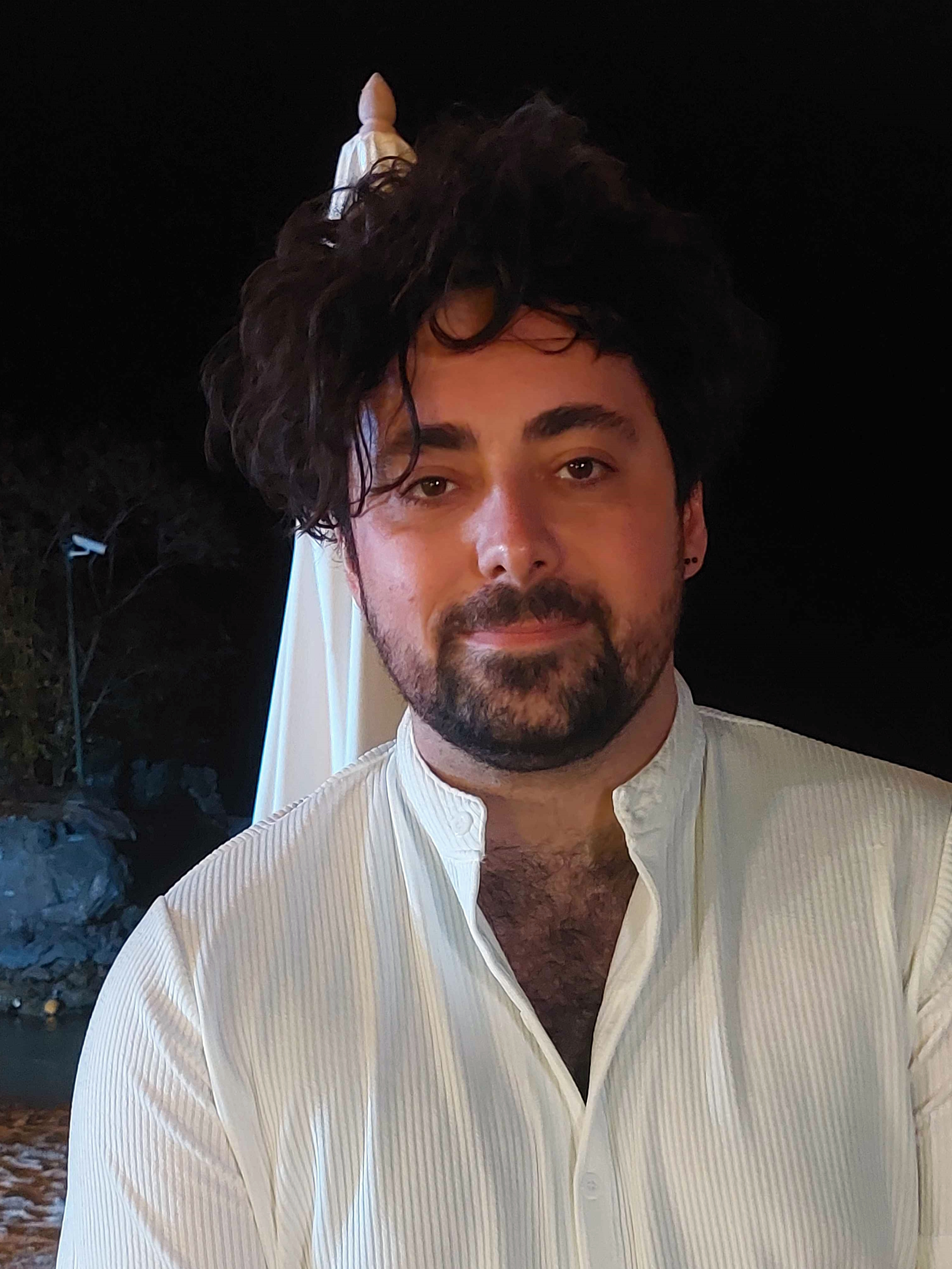
- Penkin in 2026

Background information
- Born: 22 May 1992 (age 34); United Kingdom
- Origin: Perth, Western Australia
- Genres: Orchestral; ambient; vocal; video game music
- Occupation: Composer
- Years active: 2011–present
- Website: kpenkmusic.com

Kevin Penkin (born 22 May 1992) is a British-born Australian composer, primarily for video games and anime. He is best known for composing the score of the anime Made in Abyss, which won Best Score at the 2nd Crunchyroll Anime Awards, and the score for the Tower of God anime adaptation, also won the same category at the fifth edition.. He has also composed the music for Dragon Striker.

== Biography ==
Penkin was born on 22 May 1992 in the United Kingdom, and grew up in Perth, Western Australia. Penkin's interest in video game music started from when he first heard the "Phendrana Drifts" theme from Metroid Prime; in a 2012 interview, he referred to the theme's electronic synths and acoustic instruments as "absolute bliss".

Penkin began his career with composition credits in the 2011 short films Play Lunch and The Adventures of Chipman and Biscuit Boy. In the same year, Penkin composed the soundtrack of the video game Jūzaengi: Engetsu Sangokuden; this soundtrack represented Penkin's first collaboration with Nobuo Uematsu. Penkin has continued to collaborate with Uematsu in titles such as Norn9 and Defender's Quest II: Mists of Ruin.

In 2013, Penkin received a Bachelor of Music in Composition and Music Technology at Edith Cowan University's Western Australian Academy of Performing Arts. In 2015, Penkin graduated from the Royal College of Music with a Master of Composition degree in Composition for Screen. His studies were supported by a grant from the Tait Memorial Trust as the inaugural Tait Scholar at the Royal College of Music.

In 2016, Penkin collaborated with Kinema Citrus on the Norn9 anime and the Under the Dog original video animation soundtracks. Penkin's relationship with Kinema Citrus continued through to 2017 for the soundtrack of Made in Abyss, winning the 2017 Crunchyroll Anime Award for Best Score with it. In 2018, Penkin composed the score for the video game Florence. Penkin composed the music for Kinema Citrus' anime adaptation of The Rising of the Shield Hero and NetEase's VR game Nostos in 2019. He composed the score for the 2020 anime adaptation of the South Korean webtoon Tower of God. Penkin was working with artist Takashi Murakami on the sequel to the movie Jellyfish Eyes, but the project was cancelled due to the COVID-19 pandemic. In 2021, Penkin composed the score for "The Village Bride" episode in the Disney+ animated anthology series Star Wars: Visions.

Penkin lived in the United Kingdom for some time, but now lives in Melbourne, Australia.

== Works ==
=== Anime ===
Year	Title	Note(s)
2016	Under the Dog	
2016	Norn9	
2017	Made in Abyss	Won "Best Score" at the 2nd Crunchyroll Anime Awards
2019	The Rising of the Shield Hero	Nominated for "Best Score" at the 4th Crunchyroll Anime Awards
2020	Made in Abyss: Dawn of the Deep Soul	
2020	Tower of God	Won "Best Score" at the 5th Crunchyroll Anime Awards
2021	Eden	
2021	Star Wars: Visions	Episode: "The Village Bride"
2022	The Rising of the Shield Hero 2	
2022	Made in Abyss: The Golden City of the Scorching Sun	
2022	Legend of Mana: The Teardrop Crystal	Composed the opening theme "Tear of Will"
2023	Pokémon: Paldean Winds	
2023	The Apothecary Diaries	With Satoru Kōsaki and Alisa Okehazama
2023	The Rising of the Shield Hero 3	
2024	Bye Bye, Earth	
2024	Spice and Wolf: Merchant Meets the Wise Wolf	
2024	Tower of God season 2	
2025	The Apothecary Diaries Season 2	With Satoru Kōsaki and Alisa Okehazama
2025	Bâan: The Boundary of Adulthood	
2025	Star Wars: Visions	Episode: "The Lost Ones"
2025	Tatsuki Fujimoto 17–26	Episode: "Nayuta of the Prophecy"
2026	Nippon Sangoku	
2026	Made in Abyss: Mezameru Shinpi	
2026	The Apothecary Diaries Season 3	With Satoru Kōsaki and Alisa Okehazama
2026	The Apothecary Diaries: The Late Lady's Treasure	With Satoru Kōsaki and Alisa Okehazama

=== Animation ===
Year	Title	Note(s)
2026	Dragon Striker	

=== Video games ===
Year	Title	Note(s)
2011	Jūzaengi: Engetsu Sangokuden	With Nobuo Uematsu
2012	Defender's Quest: Valley of the Forgotten	
2013	Norn9	With Nobuo Uematsu
2013	Deemo	Composed "I Race the Dawn"
2013	Leviathan: The Last Defense	
2014	Project Phoenix	
2015	Implosion: Never Lose Hope	Composed cutscenes music
2017	Kieru	
2018	Florence	Nominated at the 15th British Academy Game Awards for music
2018	This Is the Police 2	With Ben Matthews
2019	Nostos	
2019	Rebel Cops	With Ben Matthews
2020	Necrobarista	
2021	Grow: Song of the Evertree	
2021	Arknights	Composed "Heal the World"
2022	Sin Chronicle	With various others
2025	Defender's Quest II: Mists of Ruin	
2026	Sky: Children of the Light	Composed "Dear Van Gogh" experience's music
2027	Winds of Viridia	With Christopher Larkin
TBA	Renaine	With various others

=== Concert works ===
Year	Title	Note(s)
2013	Blossom Crossroads	Perth Symphony Orchestra
2013	Looking for Serenity	Perth Chamber Orchestra
2013	Altered Illustrations	Perth Chamber Orchestra; Joshua Webster, cimbalom
2014	Atmosphere	RCM Student Film Orchestra; Anaïs Laugenie, cello
2014	Changing Feet	Tait Memorial Trust Chamber Orchestra; Nicola Crowe, flute
2015	First Blood	"And So Forth" Opera Company; Rebecca Hardwick, soprano
2016	Throughtones	Greywing Ensemble
2016	Houn Maru	Commissioned by Rio Tinto, Perth Symphony Orchestra
