= The Rising of the Shield Hero =

Japanese light novel series and its adaptations

- First light novel volume cover, featuring Naofumi Iwatani (left), Raphtalia (middle), and Myne Sophia (top-right)

盾の勇者の成り上がり (Tate no Yūsha no Nariagari)
- Genre: Dark fantasy; Isekai
- Novel series
- Written by: Aneko Yusagi
- Published by: Shōsetsuka ni Narō
- Original run: 2012 – present
- Light novel
- Written by: Aneko Yusagi
- Illustrated by: Seira Minami
- Published by: Media Factory
- English publisher: NA: One Peace Books
- Imprint: MF Books
- Original run: August 22, 2013 – present
- Volumes: 22
- Manga
- Written by: Aiya Kyū
- Published by: Media Factory
- English publisher: NA: One Peace Books
- Magazine: Monthly Comic Flapper
- Original run: February 5, 2014 – present
- Volumes: 31
- Manga

The Reprise of the Spear Hero
- Written by: Neet
- Published by: Media Factory
- English publisher: NA: One Peace Books
- Imprint: MF Comics
- Original run: August 21, 2017 – January 26, 2023
- Volumes: 11
- Light novel

The Reprise of the Spear Hero
- Written by: Aneko Yusagi
- Illustrated by: Minami Seira
- Published by: Media Factory
- English publisher: NA: One Peace Books
- Imprint: MF Books
- Original run: September 25, 2017 – present
- Volumes: 5
- Manga

Tate no Yūsha no Oshinagaki
- Written by: Tendou Akano
- Published by: Kadokawa
- Imprint: MF Comics
- Original run: August 21, 2019 – present
- Volumes: 7
- Anime television series
- The Rising of the Shield Hero (2019–present)
- icon

The Rising of the Shield Hero (Japanese: 盾の勇者の成り上がり, Hepburn: Tate no Yūsha no Nariagari) is a Japanese light novel series written by Aneko Yusagi. Originally published as a web novel in the user-generated novel site Shōsetsuka ni Narō, the series has since been published by Media Factory with an expanded story-line featuring illustrations by Seira Minami. As of June 2019, 22 volumes have been published.

The light novel series was adapted into a manga series by Aiya Kyū and published by Media Factory, with 31 tankōbon volumes released as of November 2026. Both the light novel and manga series were licensed by One Peace Books and were published in North America starting in September 2015. The 25-episode anime television series adaptation produced by Kinema Citrus aired from January to June 2019. A second season, co-produced by DR Movie, aired from April to June 2022. A third season aired from October to December 2023. A fourth season aired from July to September 2025. A fifth season is set to premiere in 2027.

== Plot ==
Naofumi Iwatani, an easygoing Japanese youth, was summoned into a parallel world along with three other young Japanese men from parallel universes to become the world's Cardinal Heroes and fight inter-dimensional hordes of monsters called Waves. Only by constantly fighting against the waves can they return to their own world. Each of the heroes were equipped with their own legendary equipment when summoned. Naofumi happened to receive the Legendary Shield, the sole defensive equipment, while the other heroes received respectively, a sword, a spear, and a bow, weapons meant for attack. Furthermore, the "status magic" all four also have make it like they are in a computer game, except Naofumi is the only member of the group who has not played one. Because of these differences, he quickly is considered weak, and so as the other heroes are fully supported by the kingdom and gain several strong allies each, Naofumi's luck turns to the worse after his single companion, revealed to be the kingdom's princess, betrays him, steals all his belongings, and leaves him devoid of all assistance and supplies by framing him of sexually assaulting her.

Mocked by the nobility and shunned by everyone from his fellow heroes to peasants, a now cynical Naofumi, with nothing but his legendary equipment and current outfit that he bought prior, is forced to train as a hero alone while working to make ends meet, until he buys from a slave trader a young tanuki demi-human girl named Raphtalia, and later an egg that hatches into a bird-like monster whom he names "Filo", both quickly growing into adulthood and becoming powerful warriors under his care. As they little by little gain the trust and gratitude of the people with their heroic actions, Naofumi and his companions work together to carry out their mission as saviors as they unravel the mystery of the Waves and the reason why they are a threat not only to their world, but to other worlds as well. This is a story about mutual redemption after establishing connections with companions.

== Media ==
=== Light novel ===
Originally published as a web novel, the series has been re-written with an expanded story-line. The series is currently published by Media Factory and features illustrations by Seira Minami. As of June 25, 2019, 22 volumes have been published. The novel series and the spin-off novel The Reprise of the Spear Hero was licensed by One Peace Books.

=== Manga ===
The light novel series was adapted into a manga series by Aiya Kyū and published by Media Factory, with 31 tankōbon volumes released as of November 20, 2026. Both the novel and manga series were licensed by One Peace Books and were published in North America starting in September 2015.

=== Spin-off ===
A comedy spin-off series was released in the 61st issue of Kadokawa Dengeki Daioh G. The four-panel comedy manga, titled A Day in the Life of the Shield Hero (盾の勇者のとある一日, Tate no Yūsha no to Aru 1-Nichi), was drawn by Akagashi.

=== Anime ===
An anime television series adaptation produced by Kinema Citrus and directed by Takao Abo was broadcast from January 9 to June 26, 2019, on AT-X and other networks. It ran for 25 episodes. A second season, directed by Masato Jinbo and co-produced by DR Movie, aired from April 6 to June 29, 2022. A third season, directed by Hitoshi Haga, aired from October 6 to December 22, 2023. The fourth season aired from July 9 to September 24, 2025. Following the finale, a fifth season was announced to be in production. It is set to premiere in 2027.

The series is streamed globally by Crunchyroll, which also provides the English dub. In Southeast Asia, the series is licensed by Plus Media Networks Asia and available on platforms including Netflix, Disney+ Hotstar, and bilibili.

Characters from the series are featured in the comedy crossover series Isekai Quartet starting from its second season, which premiered on January 14, 2020.

=== Video games ===
A mobile game titled Tate no Yūsha no Nariagari Rerise (盾の勇者の成り上がり RERISE) was released for Android and iOS devices on February 24, 2021. An adaptation of the anime titled The Rising of the Shield Hero: Relive the Animation was released for Steam on September 24, 2019, for Android and iOS devices on October 24, 2019. In September 2025, a global game project for PC and smartphones based on the anime was announced.

== Reception ==
=== Sales and accolades ===
The light novel series had over 3.3 million volumes in print by December 2018, and the manga adaptation had 1 million tankōbon volumes in print by January 2019. By April 2019, the light novels and manga have sold a combined 6.2 million copies in Japan, after their sales increased by 1.2 million copies in two months, mainly due to the success of the anime adaptation.
