= Aneko Yusagi =

Japanese light novelist

- アネコユサギ
- Occupation: Novelist
- Writing career
- Genre: Fantasy
- Notable work: The Rising of the Shield Hero
- Notable awards: 7th Netto Shо̄setsu Award (Manga Adaptation Prize)

Aneko Yusagi (アネコユサギ) is a Japanese novelist.

== Career ==
Yusagi debuted with Dimension Wave in October 2012 on the Japanese web fiction website Shōsetsuka ni Narō. It would later be officially published by the Hero Bunko label in 2019.

Later the same month, they began publishing The Rising of the Shield Hero on Shōsetsuka ni Narō, which would receive its official release in 2013 under the Media Factory MF Books imprint. It received a manga adaptation in 2014. The light novel and manga adaptation began releasing in English under the One Peace Books label in 2015. The series was first adapted into anime in 2019, and later got a second season in 2022. In 2017, Yusagi would also begin releasing a spin-off series, The Reprise of the Spear Hero, which began releasing in English the following year.

In May 2015, they began publishing Ore dake Kaereru Kurasu Teni on Shōsetsuka, which later was officially released in 2016.

Their next work, Dokutsukai no Dōbōsha ~Shōgeki no Afureta Isekai de, Nazeka Ore wa Kaifukushiteiru~, was published on Shōsetsuka from 2017 to 2018, before being officially published by Media Factory that same year.

January 2019 saw the release of Isekai no Sensha Toshite Kuni ni Manekareta Kedo, Kotowatte Heishi Kara Hajimeru Koto ni Shita on Shōsetsuka, which began officially publishing later that year. It won the 7th Netto Shōsetsu Award (Manga Adaptation Prize), which resulted in it getting a manga adaptation in 2020.

== Bibliography ==
- Dimension Wave (ディメンションウェーブ) (Published by Hero Bunko, 6 volumes, 2019 -)
- The Rising of the Shield Hero (盾の勇者の成り上がり) (Published by MF Books, 22 volumes (plus 3 spin-off volumes), 2013 -)
- Ore dake Kaereru Kurasu Teni (俺だけ帰れるクラス転移) (Published by MF Books, 3 volumes, 2016–2017)
- Dokutsukai no Dōbōsha ~Shōgeki no Afureta Isekai de, Nazeka Ore wa Kaifukushiteiru~ (毒使いの逃亡者 〜瘴気のあふれた異世界で、なぜか俺は回復している〜) (Published by MF Books, 2 volumes, 2018)
- Isekai no Sensha Toshite Kuni ni Manekareta Kedo, Kotowatte Heishi Kara Hajimeru Koto ni Shita (異世界の戦士として国に招かれたけど、断って兵士から始める事にした) (Published by SB Creative, 2 volumes, 2019)
- Kinō Atsukaisarete Pātī kara Tsuihōsareta - Kedo, Nazeka Joyūsha ga "Kimi ga Hitsuyō da" to Itte Issho ni Tsuitekita!? (無能扱いされてパーティーから追放された――けど、なぜか女勇者が「君が必要だ」と言って一緒についてきた!?) (Published by MF Books, 2 volumes, 2021)
