= The Rising of the Shield Hero (TV series) =

Japanese anime television series

- 盾の勇者の成り上がり
- Genre: Dark fantasy; Isekai
- Based on: The Rising of the Shield Hero by Aneko Yusagi
- Written by: Keigo Koyonagi; Kinema Citrus (S3)
- Directed by: Takao Abo (S1); Masato Jinbo (S2); Hitoshi Haga (S3–5)
- Voices of: Kaito Ishikawa; Asami Seto; Rina Hidaka; Yoshitsugu Matsuoka; Makoto Takahashi; Yoshitaka Yamaya
- Music by: Kevin Penkin; Alfredo Sirica (S3–5); Natalie Jeffreys (S3–5)
- Country of origin: Japan
- Original language: Japanese
- No. of seasons: 4
- No. of episodes: 62 (list of episodes)

Production
- Producers: List of producers: Hiroyasu Taniguchi; Kenichi Tokumura; Nobuhiko Kurosu; Toyokazu Nakahigashi; Yasuhiro Nakajima; Junichirou Tamura (S1); Mitsuhiro Ogata (S1); Naoki Kishida (S1–2); Shou Nakata (S1–2); Takashi Tachizaki (S1–2); Yutaka Kashiwagi (S1–2); Masakatsu Umeda (S2); Kousuke Arai (S2–3); Aya Iizuka (S3); Masashi Hirayama (S3)
- Animators: Kinema Citrus; DR Movie (S2)
- Production company: Shield Hero Project (Note: Label consisting of various companies.)

Original release
- Network: AT-X, Tokyo MX, TVA, KBS, SUN, TVQ, BS11
- Release: January 9, 2019 – present

The Rising of the Shield Hero (Japanese: 盾の勇者の成り上がり, Hepburn: Tate no Yūsha no Nariagari) is a Japanese anime television series based on the light novel series The Rising of the Shield Hero written by Aneko Yusagi and illustrated by Seira Minami.

== Series overview ==
Season	Episodes	Originally released	
Season	Episodes	First released	Last released
1	25	January 9, 2019	June 26, 2019
2	13	April 6, 2022	June 29, 2022
3	12	October 6, 2023	December 22, 2023
4	12	July 9, 2025	September 24, 2025

=== Season 1 ===
Naofumi Iwatani is summoned to the Kingdom of Melromarc as the Shield Hero, one of four Cardinal Heroes. Princess Malty S. Melromarc falsely accuses him of sexual assault, leading the kingdom to ostracize him. Naofumi acquires a demi-human slave, Raphtalia, and a monster bird, Filo. Together, they defend the kingdom from the "Waves of Calamity." Naofumi eventually proves his innocence during a trial overseen by Queen Mirellia Q. Melromarc, resulting in the stripping of Malty and King Aultcray's titles.

=== Season 2 ===
Naofumi and the other Cardinal Heroes are tasked with stopping the Spirit Tortoise, a giant creature harvesting souls. After the other heroes are captured, Naofumi’s party and Ost Hourai, a manifestation of the Tortoise's soul, enter the creature to destroy its core. They discover the Spirit Tortoise was manipulated by Kyo Ethnina, a hero from a parallel dimension. Naofumi pursues Kyo into his world, where he joins the Hunting Hero, Kizuna Kazayama, to defeat Kyo and release the captured souls.

=== Season 3 ===
Following the Spirit Tortoise's death, Naofumi is granted the territory of Lurolona Village. To find and purchase the former inhabitants of the village who were sold into slavery, he participates in underground arena battles in the nation of Zeltoble. During this time, he tracks down the Spear, Sword, and Bow Heroes, who have become disillusioned following their previous defeats. He convinces them to return to Melromarc to train for the awakening of the next Guardian Beast.

=== Season 4 ===
Naofumi's party travels to the demi-human nation of Siltvelt and later to the isolated country of Q'ten Lo. After Raphtalia is targeted by assassins from Q'ten Lo, Naofumi leads a diplomatic mission that escalates into a military intervention. They join a localized rebellion against the nation's government to stop the assassination attempts and stabilize the region.

== Cast and characters ==
Character	Japanese	English
Naofumi Iwatani (岩谷 尚文, Iwatani Naofumi)	Kaito Ishikawa	Billy Kametz (S1); Stephen Fu (S2–present)
Raphtalia (ラフタリア, Rafutaria)	Asami Seto	Erica Mendez
Filo (フィーロ, Fīro)	Rina Hidaka	Brianna Knickerbocker
Motoyasu Kitamura (北村 元康, Kitamura Motoyasu)	Makoto Takahashi	Xander Mobus
Ren Amaki (天木 錬, Amaki Ren)	Yoshitsugu Matsuoka	Alan Lee
Itsuki Kawasumi (川澄 樹, Kawasumi Itsuki)	Yoshitaka Yamaya	Erik Scott Kimerer
Malty S. Melromarc (マルティ・S・メルロマルク, Maruti S Meruromaruku) / Myne (マイン, Main)	Sarah Emi Bridcutt	Faye Mata
Melty Q. Melromarc (メルティ・Q・メルロマルク, Meruti Q Meruromaruku)	Maaya Uchida	Jackie Lastra
Mirellia Q. Melromarc (ミレリア・Q・メルロマルク, Mireria Q Meruromaruku)	Kikuko Inoue	Morgan Berry
Aultcray Melromarc XXXII (オルトクレイ・メルロマルク３２世, Orutokurei Meruromaruku 32-sei)	Yutaka Nakano	Jamieson Price
Glass (グラス, Gurasu)	Megumi Han	Morgan Laure
L'Arc Berg (ラルク・ベルク, Raruku Beruku)	Jun Fukuyama	Alejandro Saab
Therese Alexanderite (テリス・アレキサンドライト, Terisu Arekisandoraito)	Saori Hayami	Mallory Rodak
Rishia Ivyred (リーシア・アイヴィレッド, Rīshia Aivireddo)	Natsuko Hara	Kira Buckland
Kizuna Kazayama (風山 絆, Kazayama Kizuna)	Miyu Tomita	Lizzie Freeman
Ost Hourai (オスト・ホウライ, Osuto Hōrai)	Kana Hanazawa	Dawn M. Bennett
Fohl (フォウル, Fōru)	Kōhei Amasaki	Kieran Flitton
Atla (アトラ, Atora)	Konomi Kohara	Emi Lo

== Production and release ==
The anime adaptation was announced in June 2017. The television series is produced by Kinema Citrus and directed by Takao Abo, with Keigo Koyanagi handling series composition, Masahiro Suwa designing the characters, and Kevin Penkin composing the music. The series aired from January 9 to June 26, 2019, on AT-X and other channels. It ran for 25 episodes.

The first opening theme is "Rise", performed by Madkid, while the first ending theme is "Kimi no Namae" (きみの名前), performed by Chiai Fujikawa. The second opening theme is "Faith," performed by Madkid, while the second ending theme is "While I'm Next to You" (あたしが隣にいるうちに, Atashi ga Tonari ni Iru Uchi ni), performed by Fujikawa. For episode 4, Asami Seto sang an insert song titled "Falling Through Starlight" as her character Raphtalia. Both Crunchyroll and Funimation streamed the series. Crunchyroll streamed the show in both the original Japanese version and the English dub. Plus Media Networks Asia licensed the series in Southeast Asia and is streaming it on Aniplus Asia, iQIYI, bilibili, Netflix, and Disney+ Hotstar. Funimation started streaming the dub on May 1, 2019. Originally intending to air the English dub simultaneously with the original Japanese, Crunchyroll announced that there would be a two-week delay in the release of the English version on May 14, the day before episode 19, "The Four Cardinal Heroes", was scheduled to release.

At 2019's Crunchyroll Expo, it was announced that the series would receive a second and third season. Masato Jinbo replaced Takao Abo as director, and the rest of the staff members reprised their roles; Kinema Citrus is joined by DR Movie for animation production. During "Kadokawa Light Novel Expo 2020", it was originally revealed that the second season would premiere in October 2021, but it was later delayed. The second season aired from April 6 to June 29, 2022. It ran for 13 episodes. In Southeast Asia, Plus Media Networks Asia licensed the second season and is simulcasting it on Aniplus Asia, bilibili, IQIYI, and Netflix. The opening theme is "Bring Back", performed by Madkid, while the ending theme is "Yuzurenai" (ゆずれない), performed by Chiai Fujikawa. On May 2, 2022, Crunchyroll announced that the second season would begin airing its dub on May 4.

The third season is directed by Hitoshi Haga, with the rest of the staff from the previous season returning, with Alfredo Sirica and Natalie Jeffreys also joining as additional composers. It aired from October 6 to December 22, 2023. The opening theme is "Sin", performed by Madkid, while the ending theme is "Suki ni Natte wa Ikenai Riyū" (好きになってはいけない理由), performed by Chiai Fujikawa. On October 19, 2023, Crunchyroll announced that the third season would begin airing its dub the following day.

In January 2024, it was announced that a fourth season was in production, and aired from July 9 to September 24, 2025. The opening theme is "Resolution", performed by Madkid, while the ending theme is "Eien ni Ikkai no" (永遠に一回の), performed by Chiai Fujikawa. Hitoshi Haga reprises his role as director. The series composition is done by Keigo Koyanagi, the character design by Franziska van Wulfen, Sana Komatsu and Masahiro Suwa, the soundtrack by Kevin Penkin, Alfredo Sirica and Natalie Jeffreys. Crunchyroll is streaming the dub in the same day the season aired.

Following the fourth season finale, a fifth season was announced. It is set to premiere in 2027.

Characters from this series are featured in Isekai Quartet, a comedy crossover series featuring franchises published by Kadokawa Corporation, from season 2 onwards. That season premiered on January 14, 2020.

== Reception ==
=== Controversy in North America ===
When the anime adaptation began airing in North America, the first episode came under controversy. Several Anime News Network reviewers criticized the series for its framing of a false rape accusation, and the protagonist purchasing a girl as a slave was controversial. When producer Junichiro Tamura was asked about it, he responded that there "have not been any controversies regarding the series in Japan, so it is difficult to say. In the case there were any controversy domestically, we will try to address all issues with the staff and people involved to bring our customers a better product the next time."

Reviews of subsequent episodes have been generally positive. Theron Martin of Anime News Network gave a rating of B− for the first two episodes, stating "the series looks like it's gotten over its initial problematic hump and should hopefully slide into a more agreeable story flow." He gave a B+ rating for the third episode, stating that "the series seems like it's angling to build Naofumi up more as a folk hero than the famously brazen heroes we're used to seeing in fantasy stories" and that "episode 3 gives the best argument to date for the series' possible potential."

The second season received heavy scrutiny from both fans and critics due to its fast pacing and changes to the source material.

=== Accolades ===
At the 4th Crunchyroll Anime Awards in 2020, the character Raphtalia was selected as Best Girl, while Billy Kametz was awarded the Best Voice Artist Performance (English) for his role as Naofumi Iwatani. Kevin Penkin was nominated in the Best Score category for his series' work.
