= Makoto Takahashi =

Makoto Takahashi may refer to:

- Makoto Takahashi (voice actor)
- Makoto Takahashi (fighter)

== See also ==
- Macoto Takahashi, Japanese painter, illustrator, and manga artist
