= List of The Rising of the Shield Hero characters =

The light novel, manga, and anime series The Rising of the Shield Hero features a diverse cast of characters. The visuals of the characters were designed by Minami Seira and their stories were created by Aneko Yusagi.

== Main characters ==
=== Naofumi Iwatani ===
Voiced by: Kaito Ishikawa (Japanese); Billy Kametz (season 1), Stephen Fu (season 2–present) (English)
The Shield Hero and protagonist, Naofumi Iwatani (岩谷 尚文, Iwatani Naofumi) was a university student who was summoned from another world after finding a book about the Four Heroes. Originally an open minded person, he becomes cynical and distrustful of others due to being looked down by his fellow heroes, subjected to religious prejudice from citizens, and being robbed and falsely accused of attempted rape by Malty. It is only after Raphtalia defended him and proclaimed her loyalty that Naofumi began to slowly open up to those around him and realizing his mistakes. Viewing his role as a Hero burdensome, having been summoned against his will, Naofumi shows little remorse in using underhanded tactics to ensure the survival of his party despite the criticism of his fellow heroes. Generally reluctant to trust strangers, often asking to be paid upfront or using slave curses to prevent lying, he tries his best to live up to the expectations of those who have placed their faith in him or treat him as an equal.

=== Raphtalia ===
Voiced by: Asami Seto (Japanese); Erica Mendez (English)
The Vassal Katana Hero and main heroine. Originally living in a village on Melromarc's coast, Raphtalia (ラフタリア, Rafutaria) is a Tanuki-Raccoon demi-human who was left orphaned in the wake of the first Wave to strike the world. Shortly after, she and her fellow villagers were captured and sold into slavery by Melromarc's Royal Knights. First purchased by a nobleman, she is physically and emotionally tortured out of racial resentment towards demi-humans and left a shell of her former self. Near death and suffering from panic attacks, she was sold back and later purchased by Naofumi who, unable to fight himself, desired to use her as his sword in the coming Waves.
Under Naofumi's protection, Raphtalia becomes a skilled sword-fighter and is able to find closure from her past traumas. Able to see past Naofumi's cynical nature, she falls in love with him and does her best to help him overcome his resentment towards others and losing himself to the Shield of Wrath, even volunteering to have her slave curse re-applied after it is forcibly removed as a sign of devotion. It is later revealed that through her Tanuki heritage, she is an heir to the throne of Q'Ten Lo, her father having eloped to Melromarc and putting her at odds with her distant relatives.
Technically a 10 year old girl, being a demi-human, Raphtalia's body is able to age to that of a young woman as her levels increase. Due to this, she often gets annoyed when Naofumi treats her as his daughter or is oblivious to her feelings; the latter believing she is only focused on getting stronger. While traveling in Kizuna's world, she is chosen as the wielder of the Vassal Katana (Sever Star Hammer in the web novel). She comes to specialize in Light/Dark magic through which she can generate illusions and turn invisible. Through her royal heritage, she also gains the ability to pacify some of the abilities of the Legendary & Vassal Weapon wielders.
Raphtalia was selected as Best Girl at the 4th Crunchyroll Anime Awards in 2020.

=== Filo ===
Voiced by: Rina Hidaka (Japanese); Brianna Knickerbocker (English)
A Filolial Queen. Hatching her from an egg purchased from the Beloukas, Filo (フィーロ, Fīro) is the youngest of Naofumi's allies. She is part of a monster species called Filolials that enjoy pulling carts, and having been raised by a Hero, develops into a Queen. As a Queen, she resembles a large flightless owl and possesses higher attack strength and speed than normal members of her species. In addition, she possesses the unique ability to shapeshift into a young blonde girl with wings, retaining the strength of her true form.
Young and boisterous, she has a short attention span, has a ravenous appetite, and often fights with Raphtalia and Gaelion for Naofumi's attention. Also highly impressionable, she has been shown to pick up on some of Naofumi's habits much to Raphtalia's distress. A capable learner, she is able to use advanced wind magic spells and many of the teachings of Hengen Muso with minimal instruction. Her skills are recognized by her Queen predecessor, Fitoria, and is given some of her power.
In spite of her sometimes overbearing personality, Filo is able to quickly make friends with others and takes other Filolials on as her underlings. True to her Filolial instincts, her favorite hobby is to pull a custom cart Naofumi made for her. While in Kizuna's world, due to Filolial's not existing, she is transformed into a species called a Humming Fairy, losing her strength in favor of being able to fly and cast magic through singing.

=== Raph-chan ===
A Shikigami/Familiar and the progenitor of the Raph species of Tanuki-like monsters. With assistance from Ethnobolt, Raph-chan (ラフちゃん, Rafu-chan) was created by Naofumi in order to help locate Raphtalia after they had become separated in Kizuna's world. Through continued experimentation and strength enhancement by Naofumi, Raph-chan quickly gains abilities that exceed that of a normal Shikigami. Through her influence upon class-up process, the tamed monsters of Lurolona Village, seeking Naofumi's affection, choose to become just like her, resulting in creation of the Raph species of monsters.
Created using a mixture of Raphtalia's hair and Naofumi's blood, Raph-chan most heavily resembles her former parent in appearance and is able to use many of the same Light/Dark magic abilities as her to assist in battle. She is also able to track her parents' whereabouts at all times and can be automatically summoned to either of their locations. While generally highly friendly and affectionate, due to Naofumi's inherited influence, she is shown to not be above punishing those who cross her allies.
Named after Raphtalia herself, upon Raph-chan's creation, Naofumi quickly becomes obsessed with her, openly doting over and petting her as a way to relief stress; unironically vowing to make the Raph species become the new dominate monsters of the land. Embarrassed over her creation and Naofumi's obsession, Raphtalia, however, comes to view Raph-chan with slight frustration and jealously.

== Summoned Heroes ==
=== Legendary Heroes ===
Motoyasu Kitamura (北村 元康, Kitamura Motoyasu)
Voiced by: Makoto Takahashi (Japanese); Xander Mobus (English)
The Spear Hero. Motoyasu was a university student before he was summoned, having been stabbed to death after a misunderstanding between a childhood friend and a classmate. While generally a kindhearted person, he is immensely gullible and thick-headed; showing near complete unawareness of the actions of his manipulative party members or the foresight to plan ahead. A heavy womanizer, he is looked down upon by his fellow heroes for his skirt chasing habits, and is extremely trusting of women to his own detriment. He also displays a Lolita complex towards Filo, as she resembles a video game character in his home-world.
Initially the leader of a party composed entirely of women who act as his cheerleaders. Unaware of her true nature, Motoyasu sympathizes with Malty's claims against Naofumi and invites her to join him; initially leading Naofumi to believe the two were working together. Despite warnings from his fellow heroes and Mirellia, he believes Malty's claims of Naofumi brainwashing others and clashes with him repeatedly, even after Malty's true nature is exposed. Later, he is abandoned by his party and left for dead during the battle with the Spirit Tortoise, leaving him critically depressed. Comforted by Filo, he chooses to re-dedicate his efforts to winning her heart and seeks approval from Naofumi to marry her; leading many to question his mental stability and causing Filo distress with his unwanted advances.
Motoyasu is shown to be physically the strongest of the Heroes. He unlocks the cursed Spears of Lust and Envy after Malty's betrayal, and as a result of their cursed aftereffects: literally seeing/hearing most women as squealing pigs, his mental state deteriorates even further. More rash in his actions than ever, only through Filo is Naofumi able to get him to listen to reason. Unaware of the aftereffects, he creates a party composed of Filolials; having fallen madly in love with the species as a whole. As a result of needing to regularly clothe his newfound party's human forms, he quickly becomes an able tailor with his fashion sense leaving allies in awe. In the anime, he has referred to Raphtalia as a "racoon-pig" and Malty comes up in his HUD as "Crimson Swine".
The title protagonist of The Reprise of the Spear Hero, Motoyasu, upon being killed in battle, unlocks the ability to time travel and returns to the start of the series with his stats and memories of Filo intact. Proclaiming himself: "The Love Hunter", he dedicates himself again to trying to win Filo's heart and protecting Naofumi from the events that turned him cynical; generally with mixed results.

Ren Amaki (天木 錬, Amaki Ren)
Voiced by: Yoshitsugu Matsuoka (Japanese); Alan Lee (English)
The Sword Hero. The youngest of the Heroes, Ren was a high school student before he was summoned after being killed trying to save a childhood friend. A loner by nature, he does his best to keep his image as a cool guy intact; at one point resorting to cheating when in a losing duel against Eclair. Viewing things through the lens of a single player RPG, he prefers to run his party like a guild and only working directly together as a last resort, believing each member is only responsible for themselves. While the most willing of the Heroes to hear out Naofumi's claims and advice, his condescending nature towards those at lower levels than himself still leads to tension between the two. To the amusement of his fellow heroes, he has a fear of water and is unable to swim.
After his entire party is killed by the Spirit Tortoise, having blindly led them into battle, he falls into a state of denial and grief. Despite Naofumi's initial attempts to help him, he instead turns to Malty for emotional support and is soon robbed of his belongings. Donning a disguise, he resorts to stealing to get by and becomes the leader of a group of bandits; unlocking the cursed Swords of Greed and Gluttony in the process.
In his cursed state, he is re-challenged by Eclair and is easily defeated. Finally willing to accept responsibility for his past mistakes and unable to gain experience or money as a result of using his cursed weapons, he chooses to stay in Naofumi's village and become Eclair's student. He later takes himself up as a new apprentice to Motoyasu II, training himself to become a blacksmith and create new weapons for his allies. In the anime, he can still gain experience and fight; only (at least for a time) anything living he touches will lose levels and degrade, but he still remains a swordsman and has not gone into blacksmithing as of yet.

Itsuki Kawasumi (川澄 樹, Kawasumi Itsuki)
Voiced by: Yoshitaka Yamaya (Japanese); Erik Scott Kimerer (English)
The Bow Hero. Itsuki was a high school student before he was summoned, having been killed after a large truck took a sudden left turn. Calling himself an ally of Justice, he holds a superiority complex and has an innate need for attention, often bragging about his exploits to others. He chooses to run his party in a vigilante-like fashion, primarily taking on missions that involve corrupt officials and assisting others at the most opportune moments. He runs his party within a strict hierarchy of seniority, treating new party members as servants. Due to his self-indulgent attitude and treatment of his party members, Naofumi comes to dislike him the most of his fellow heroes. Itsuki's feud with Naofumi comes to a head after his party frames Rishia for a crime as a thinly veiled excuse to get him kick her out of his party; already viewing her as weak and upset for upstaging them during the Wave in Cal Mira.
His remaining party later betrays him during the battle with the Spirit Tortoise by tying him up and leaving him for dead. In a state of denial, he is soon tricked by Malty into fighting on her behalf in tournaments in Zeltoble; believing he was raising money to help her stop Naofumi from abusing his slaves and extorting citizens for money. Unlocking the cursed Bow of Pride, he fights against Rishia and is defeated as Naofumi and Ren expose the truth. Left in debt by Malty and having lost his volition as a result of his cursed weapon, he begs Rishia for forgiveness and chooses to stay in Naofumi's village as he recovers.
Coming from a world where humans have recently developed psychic powers, Itsuki was born with the precision ability called "Accuracy." Initially over-confident at a young age, as he grew older and learned that his ability was classified as low-ranking, he turned to games as an escape. While traveling in the parallel world, Itsuki reveals his talent at playing music, leading him to obtain possession of the Vassal Musical Instrument; temporarily replacing his disabled Legendary Bow.

Kizuna Kazayama (風山 絆, Kazayama Kitzuna)
Voiced by: Miyu Tomita (Japanese); Lizzie Freeman (English)
The Hunting Hero. One of the four Legendary Heroes of the parallel world, Kizuna was playing a virtual reality game when she was summoned. Unlike the other Heroes called upon to fight the Waves, she was summoned prior to their appearance and was tasked with defeating the Demon Dragon Emperor. A strong-willed woman, she has an easy time making friends and enjoys traveling the world. An avid fisherman, her party members sometimes have to restrain her to help keep her focus on tasks at hand. Despite her looks, she is eighteen years old and takes pride in being an otaku. She lives in a home she built herself alongside Glass; later inspiring Naofumi to found his own village.
After her party defeated the Demon Dragon, she found herself in a hostile country and was cast into a magic labyrinth. By the time she meets Naofumi and Rishia, having been cast themselves into the labyrinth by Kyo, several years had passed. With Naofumi's assistance, they are able to escape and work together to find their displaced party members. Initially unaware of the threat of the Waves, she orders her party to cease their attacks on Naofumi's world. She and her party join Naofumi in defeating Kyo and vow to work together to solve the mystery of the Waves and save their worlds without resorting to killing their opposing Legendary Heroes.
Her Legendary Hunting Tool can turn into a large hunting knife or fishing rod. Not unlike Naofumi, she is restricted in her attacking capabilities in that she can only attack monsters. After needing to be rescued a second time, she unlocks the cursed Hunting Tool of Sloth. Kizuna does not appear in the original web novel, although Glass, near the end of the story, mentions a close friend gone missing, probably referring to Kizuna.

Shildina (シルディナ, Shirudina)
The Ofuda Hero. Originally hailing from Q'Ten Lo, Shildina is the younger sister of Sadeena and a Orca demi-human. Born shortly after Sadeena had fled, Shildina was viewed as nothing more than a substitute for her genius older sister and fulfilling her abandoned duties as a priestess and royal executioner. Only loyal to the child Emperor Ruftmilia and head advisor Makina, she comes to hold a deep resentment towards her family and especially her older sister.
Shildina first appears before Naofumi in disguise as he assists local rebels in overthrowing the corrupt Q'Ten Lo government; the two not realizing each others true identity. Quickly taking a liking to him, she gifts Naofumi with an Ofuda containing part of her soul before disappearing. She reappears as the head General leading the remaining army of government loyalists and challenging her older sister to a duel. In the chaos of battle, Makina's treachery is exposed and Naofumi is able to restore her soul. Having made peace with her older sister, she joins her in returning to Naofumi's village and watching over Ruftmilia.
A scatterbrained individual, Shildina is shown to have little awareness for her surroundings and often loses track of where she is going. Like her sister, she regularly flirts with Naofumi and, despite only being 10 years old, is an avid alcoholic; presumably due to her training as a priestess. While not as experienced as her older sister, having fully completed her priestess training, she is able to channel the spirits of past warriors into herself to temporarily gain their knowledge and abilities. Having been summoned to join the battle against the Vanguards of the Waves in the parallel world, Shildina is selected as the new Legendary Ofuda Hero upon its liberation. While normally Legendary Heroes are selectively summon, Naofumi theorizes that she must have always been a top candidate for wielding the weapon, but was unable to be summoned at first due to her initial duties as a priestess.

=== Seven Star and Vassal Heroes ===
Rishia Ivyred (リーシア＝アイヴィレッド, Rishia Aivireddo)
Voiced by: Natsuko Hara (Japanese); Kira Buckland (English)
The Seven Star Projectile Hero. The daughter of a lesser noble family, she was originally kidnapped by a corrupt nobleman and was saved by Itsuki. Having fallen in love with him and admiring his sense of justice, Rishia joined Itsuki's party. Itsuki, however, seeing her as a burden, tries to drive her away by treating her as more of a servant than a teammate. After inadvertently upstaging them during the Cal Mira Wave, Itsuki's party resorts to framing her for breaking an important item and convinces him to kick her out. Left emotionally frail, Rishia attempts to commit suicide but is rescued by Naofumi and Filo. Sensing a kindred spirit in her and wanting to prove Itsuki wrong, Naofumi takes her into his party, hoping to train her into a capable fighter.
Upon meeting the Elrasla, she is selected to be her apprentice and undergoes heavy training to be able to utilize Life Force energy. Later, when Itsuki is corrupted by his cursed weapon, she challenges him to a duel with the intent of teaching him the difference between justice and self-righteousness. For her courage, the Legendary Bow chooses her to wield the Seven Star Projectile (Knives/Boomerangs/Throwing Stars); its true power is only unlocked upon its liberation from Takt later on. After defeating Itsuki, she re-joins his party and works to help him recover from his curse.
A shy young girl with poor stamina, Rishia has lack of confidence in herself but learns to open up after joining Naofumi's party. Despite being at a high level, her stats are notably weak and have poor growths. It is only in times of crisis does her hidden power shine through, allowing her to take on powerful opponents such as Kyo single-handedly. She also displays a remarkable learning ability and is a budding scholar; leading Naofumi to believe that there are hidden stats she specializes in.

Aultcray Melromarc XXXII (オルトクレイ＝メルロマルク, Orutokurai Meromaruku XXXII)
Voiced by: Yutaka Nakano (Japanese); Jamieson Price (English)
The King Consort of Melromarc and the Seven Star Staff Hero. His real name: Lüge Lansarz Faubrey (リュージュランサーズフォーブリー, Ryūju Ransāzu Fōburī), Aultcray was formerly an heir to the throne of Faubrey. After his parents are killed by the Hakuko of Siltvelt and losing his right to the throne as a result, he and his blind younger sister changed their names and moved to Melromarc. Shortly after, he joined Melromarc's army and rose through the ranks, becoming the Staff Hero, winning an on-going war with Siltvelt, and marrying Mirellia. His hatred of demi-humans is intensified after his sister is kidnapped/murdered by the Hakuko clan (not realizing she was in love with Siltvelt's Hakuko Prince) and his son is assassinated (Siltvelt having been framed) and leading him to follow the Church of the Three Heroes.
Taking charge of Melromarc while his wife is away on diplomatic business, Aultcray turned a blind eye to Melromarc's knights when they enslaved Raphtalia's village, and at the behest of the Church, has all four of the Legendary Heroes summoned. Initially tolerant of Naofumi being the Shield Hero, he stages a kangaroo court after his daughter Malty accuses Naofumi of rape and puts in place obstacles to make his life more difficult. Having broken several treaties and degrading the status of the Shield Hero, he is later placed under arrest by his wife in an attempt to prevent war from breaking out. He is stripped of his nobility and, in lieu of Naofumi's push for the death penalty, has his named legally changed to "Trash".
Still firm in his beliefs that the Shield Hero will bring nothing but ruin to Melromarc, Aultcray initially remained defiant of Mirellia's attempts to make amends with Naofumi. His attitude begins to change slightly after a chance encounter with Fohl and Atla; the children of his deceased sister who are traveling with Naofumi. Falling into a deep depression upon the deaths of both his wife and his niece Atla, Aultcray is convinced by Naofumi to live up to Mirellia's final request, re-assuming his role as protector of Melromarc as the Staff Hero, choosing to remain being called "Trash" in recognition of his past mistakes.

Fitoria (フィトリア, Fitoria)
Voiced by: Sakura Tange (Japanese); Cristina Vee (English)
Queen of the Filolials and the lost Vassal Carriage Hero. Several hundred years old, Fitoria is the last surviving party member of the previous generation of the Legendary Heroes and the created daughter of Mamoru & Filolia. Before their passing, the previous Legendary Heroes tasked her with protecting the world from the Waves upon their return. Acting in secret, Fitoria and her army fight the Waves that affect areas left unprotected by the current Legendary Heroes.
She first appears before Naofumi's party and offers a safe haven while they're on the run from the Church of the Three Heroes. Threatening to kill him and the other Legendary Heroes to continue the summoning cycle, Fitoria orders Naofumi to work with his fellow Legendary Heroes. Upon Naofumi's refusal, she takes Melty as a hostage and challenges Filo to a duel. Recognizing her potential, she chooses Filo as a potential successor and to trust in Naofumi, gifting Filo with some of her power. Using Filo as a medium, she is able to contact Naofumi with telepathy and assists his party in the battle against the Spirit Tortoise that was controlled by Kyo.
A stern figure, Fitoria has come to hold a pessimistic view of humanity. Immensely powerful and taking her duties seriously, she's willing to resort to any measure to protect the world even if it means forcibly continuing the Legendary Hero cycle or allowing the Guardian Beasts to rampage. Like Filo, she can take on the appearance of a young girl. The current owner of the Vassal Carriage, it has been in her possession for so long that its existence has been forgotten, leading to the remaining known Vassal Weapons being dubbed: "Seven Star Weapons."

Fohl (フォウル, Fouru)
Voiced by: Kōhei Amasaki (Japanese); Kieran Regan (English)
The Seven Star Gauntlet Hero and a White Tiger demi-human. The grandson of the former king of Siltvelt, he travels to Zeltoble and sells himself into slavery after the funds left by his deceased parents run out; fighting in coliseums to pay for medicine for his younger sister. He and Atla are later purchased by Naofumi and brought to his village. Grateful to Naofumi for curing his sister's disease, Fohl vows to pull his fair share of work to pay him back by fighting in the Waves.
A member of the Hakuko, a rare and powerful species of demi-humans, Fohl is both proud, stubborn, and a natural martial artist. Deeply overprotective of his younger sister, he often clashes with Atla's adamant personality resulting in him being left on receiving end of her attacks; causing Naofumi to wonder who is stronger between two. Despite being only half demi-human, he obtains the ability transform into a Therianthrope and later, with Naofumi's help, gains the ability to use the even stronger: Beast Transformation. Vowing to continue fighting to honor his late sister's final wishes when she is fatally injured during the Phoenix battle, Fohl is chosen to wield the Seven Star Gauntlet.

Sadeena (サディナ, Sadina)
Voiced by: Ami Koshimizu (Japanese); Alice Himora (English)
The Vassel Harpoon Hero. An Orca demi-human hailing from Q'Ten Lo, Sadeena is a former shrine priestess. Viewed as a child prodigy within her clan, Sadeena was forcibly trained from a young age to act as the royal executioner and leading her to detest her family and Q'Ten Lo's leadership. Loyal to Raphtalia's father, an heir to the Q'Ten Lo throne, she joined him and Raphtalia's mother in their elopement. Away on a fishing trip during the First Wave, Sadeena was unable to protect her fellow villagers or prevent their enslavement by Melromarc's Royal Knights. She tracks the survivors down to Zeltoble, and enslaves herself as a coliseum fighter to buy back their freedom and leading her to a chance meeting with Naofumi's party.
A motherly figure to her fellow villagers, she deeply regrets her initial failure to protect her home and Raphtalia in particular. Acting as an older sister, she tries her best to protect Raphtalia from her family history, knowing it could spark a war. An avid alcoholic, she often flirts with Naofumi, who unwittingly beat her in a drinking contest; though it is unknown how true her feelings are. An extremely capable veteran fighter, she possesses enough power to hold her own against Naofumi's entire party and willingly break free of her slave curse; a feat that would kill most.
Wielding a trident, she uses a mix of water and lightning magic and can increase her stats by using her Therianthrope form. With Naofumi's assistance, she is later able to unlock her Beast Transformation, allowing her to fly through the air as if she was swimming. Rescuing it from the Vanguards of the Waves while traveling in the parallel world, Sadeena is chosen as the new wielder of the Vassal Harpoon.

Glass (グラス, Gurasu)
Voiced by: Megumi Han (Japanese); Morgan Berry (English)
The Vassal Fan Hero. A martial artist chosen to wield the Vassal Fan, she joined Kizuna's party and became her closest ally. Cold and stern, she has a high sense of honor and only opens up to Kizuna; whom she considers her best friend. After Kizuna's disappearance, as an act of desperation, Glass and Kizuna's remaining allies decide to invade Naofumi's world upon learning their world may be spared from the Waves should the opposing world's Legendary Heroes perish.
Glass first appears before the Legendary Heroes during the third Wave and challenges Naofumi to a duel, recognizing him as the only true hero among them. Overwhelmed by her power, Naofumi's party narrowly survives. She appears again before Naofumi during the Cal Mira Wave to aid her allies in killing him, but are forced to retreat after Naofumi discovers her weakness. Ordered by her weapon to kill Kyo after he goes rogue, she forms an alliance with Naofumi to defeat him; eventually reuniting with Kizuna in the process. Initially looking down upon Naofumi, she comes to respect him and is grateful for his help in rescuing Kizuna. As a sign of friendship, Naofumi leaves her with a recipe for Soul-Healing Water, to help her cover her weakness in future battles.
A member of a race known as Spirit People, at any given time her level and stats are tied directly to her Soul Power. As such, Glass is vulnerable to attacks that can drain this stat. Using her fans, she fights using a graceful form of martial arts. Similar to Raphtalia, she discovers that she hails from a long fallen Kingdom that parallels Q'Ten Lo in its ability to pacify the Legendary Weapons. Due to her thinner bloodline, however, she can only access these abilities with assistance from Shildina.

L'Arc Berg Sickle (ラルクベルク＝シクール, Rarukuberuku Shikūru)
Voiced by: Jun Fukuyama (Japanese); Alejandro Saab (English)
The Vassal Scythe Hero. The young king of a country that revers the Hunting Hero, he is chosen to wield the Vassal Scythe and joins Kizuna's party upon her summoning. A relaxed person, he enjoys traveling and fighting despite his duties as king. He and his companion, Therese, secretly travel to Naofumi's world, hoping to find and defeat the Legendary Heroes to save his own world.
L'Arc unwittingly befriends Naofumi when they travel to the Cal Mira islands to train, offering to team up during their stay. Hearing rumors that the Shield Hero is a criminal, he insists that Naofumi could not be the Legendary Hero, believing him to be a good person and calling him "kiddo" instead. It is only during the Cal Mira Wave does he come to realize who Naofumi is and challenges him, but is forced to retreat. He later returns and allies with Naofumi in order to defeat Kyo; renouncing his goal of killing the Legendary Heroes upon Kizuna's orders. L'Arc does not appear in the web novel.

Ethnobalt (エスノバルト, Esunobaruto)
Voiced by: Kengo Kawanishi (Japanese); Caleb Yen (English)
The Vassal Book Hero. The leader of the Library Rabbit species, a race of scholars that inhabit the parallel world. Like the Filolial species, he has the ability to take the form of a young boy. Introduced to Naofumi by Kizuna, he uses his knowledge in the creation of Shikigami/Familiars to help in the search for their missing friends and later joins in the battle against Kyo. A reserved individual, due to his species not being suited for combat, he generally leaves himself to playing a supportive role in battle.
Initially introduced as the Vassal Boat Hero, giving himself the ability to fly and transport allies, it is subsequently stolen by the Vanguards of the Waves. During the battle against Hidemasa, Ethnobalt is chosen to be the new Vassal Book Hero, giving him the ability to take offensive action in battle. While in Naofumi's world, due to Library Rabbits not existing, he takes the form of a Usapil monster.

S'yne Lokk (セイン＝ロック, Sein Rokku)
Voiced by: Maria Naganawa (Japanese); Lisa Reimold (English)
The Vassal Sewing Set Hero. The sole survivor of a world that had been destroyed after its Legendary Heroes were killed, she was left traveling aimlessly from world to world. Left without purpose, she disguises herself and joins the Zeltoble coliseum circuit, quickly rising to become the top fighter. She meets Naofumi's party in the finals of a tournament and is narrowly defeated. Afterwards, she re-appears in Naofumi's village, hoping to join his party in fighting against the Vanguards of the Waves and offering proceeds from her coliseum matches.
S'yne's primary weapon is a pair of scissors and can bind opponents using threads. She can create stuffed animal familiars, to fight and speak on her behalf, and also special sewing pins that allow her teleport to their location. Deceptively quiet and emotionless, S'yne comes to hold a deep respect for Naofumi; placing her pins on his armor so she can keep track of him at all times. Due to the destruction of her home world, the translation feature of her weapon is broken, leaving her speech partially static and slowly causing her weapon to lose strength. A member of the Skywing race, she slowly regains her race's lost ability to fly through training with her ancestor R'yne. S'yne does not appear in the web novel.

=== Past Heroes ===
Mamorou Shirono

The Shield Hero of Legend and eventual founder of Siltvelt. Mamorou is a kind and caring hero if rather flawed. After being sent to the past by an unknown force, and a chance encounter with him, Naofumi teams up with Mamorou to navigate his way and help out his current growing community.
It is later revealed that that with the help of Rat's ancestor, Holn Anthreya, Mamorou has been modifying several of the demi-human children within his care. Thus creating the eventual ruling races of Siltvelt.
Mamorou's reasoning for his unethical behavior is so that the children can become stronger. And more importantly, to find a way to bring back his girlfriend, L'yne/Filolia.
In his experiments with Holn, Mamorou has created several familiars which include Fitoria, the progenitor of the Filolial race.

R'yne

An ancestor to S'yne Lokk and the Sewing Kit Hero of the ancient past. After her sister L'yne/Filolia had been summoned to the Shield and Bow World of the past, R'yne had followed and eventually found her.
While initially disliking it, she had allowed Mamorou and Holn to try to find a way to bring her sister back to life.
As a member of the Skywing race, she recognizes S'yne as one and her descendant. She late comes to teach her the Skywing's apparent lost techniques and much of her lineage.

== Antagonists ==
Malty S. Melromarc (マルティ＝S＝メルロマルク, Maruti Meruromaruku)
Voiced by: Sarah Emi Bridcutt (Japanese); Faye Mata (English)
The former first Princess of Melromarc and primary antagonist of the series. Using "Myne Sophia" as her adventurer name, Malty was the first and only person to join Naofumi in the beginning, but shortly after, she stole his money and equipment, and then claimed he raped her. She joins Motoyasu's party, believing his good looks will be able to help her standing within Melromarc's nobility. While in Motoyasu's party she acts as his second-in-command, taking advantage of his gullibility and manipulating him into doing her dirty work or making Naofumi's life more miserable. Despite Motoyasu's kindness, she insults him behind his back and sells her fellow party members into sexual slavery should they get in her way.
After the defeat of the Church of the Three Heroes, whose members she worked with in an attempt to assassinate her sister Melty and frame Naofumi, Malty's true nature is exposed by her mother. Disowned from the royal family, Malty is placed under a special slave curse and is forced to reveal the rest of her crimes. In lieu of Naofumi's push for the death penalty, her name is legally changed to "Bitch". She stays in Motoyasu's party so she can repay her debts; Motoyasu still believing her lies. She and her followers, however, abandon Motoyasu during the battle with the Spirit Tortoise. Now a wanted criminal, she goes on the run, later manipulating and robbing both Ren and Itsuki.
Traveling to Faubrey, Malty briefly joins Takt's harem of women and works with him to steal the Legendary Weapons and killing her family in exchange for removing her slave curse. Thereafter she appears as a member of the Vanguards of the Waves, assisting them in stealing the Legendary & Vassal Weapons of Kizuna's world.
Specializing in fire magic, Malty is sadistic, power hungry, and manipulative. She uses her looks and status to control others, often appealing to their egos or taking advantage of their naivety. Prior to the start of the series, believing her unfit to rule and having found evidence of her potential involvement in her younger brother's assassination, Mirellia placed her second-in-line to the throne after her younger sister.

Mald (マルド, Marudo)
Voiced by: Taiten Kusunoki (Japanese); D. C. Douglas (English)
Nicknamed "Armor" by Naofumi due to never being seen without wearing a heavy suit of armor and general lack of interest in remembering his name, Mald is a former member of Itsuki's party. Having joined Itsuki's party to boost his own sense of superiority, he has a stuck up attitude and looks down upon Naofumi and all demi-humans. Deluded and self righteous, he views anyone who disagrees with him as evil.
Annoyed with Naofumi's successes and Itsuki's lack thereof, Mald joins his fellow party members in abandoning Itsuki during the battle against the Spirit Tortoise by tying him up and leaving him for dead. Joining Malty and her allies as they escape Melromarc, he assists her in tricking Itsuki into fighting in Zeltoble's coliseum.
Alongside Malty, Mald reappears before Naofumi and Itsuki in Kizuna's world as a member of the Vanguards of the Waves. Having stolen the power of the Seven Star Axe, he assists them in stealing Legendary & Vassal Weapons. However following his initial defeat, his ownership of the Seven Star Axe is relinquished leading to his defeat and capture by Itsuki's party.

Church of the Three Heroes
The primary religion of Melromarc who view the Shield Hero as a demon. Originally a part of the Church of the Four Heroes, which worshiped the Legendary Heroes equally, the Church broke off due to racial resentment when a former Shield Hero assisted in the founding of demi-human nations such as Siltvelt. Helping found Melromarc in opposition, the Church holds sway among Melromarc's citizens and guards the country's Dragon Vein Hourglass; a tool used to Class Up, predict the Waves, and can be used as warp points by Legendary Heroes.
After Queen Mirellia, who doesn't subscribe to their beliefs, left on a diplomatic tour of the world, the Church used their sway with King Aultcray to prematurely summon the Legendary Heroes; hoping to manipulate Motoyasu, Ren, and Itsuki to gain more power while making Naofumi's life more difficult. Yet despite their efforts, Naofumi's heroics and the general incompetence of the remaining Three Heroes causes them to start losing influence among the populace. Taking drastic measures, they attempt to frame Naofumi for assassinating, later kidnapping, Princess Melty. Coming to the conclusion that Motoyasu, Ren, and Itsuki are fake Heroes and proclaiming himself to be a God, the High Priest (Biscas T. Balmus (ビスカ＝T＝バルマス, Bisuka Barumasu) in the anime) leads his followers in an attempt to eliminate all four of the Legendary Heroes and overthrow the royal family. With assistance from a returning Mirellia, Naofumi kills the High Priest with the Shield of Wrath as his followers are arrested. In the aftermath, Mirellia uses the political opportunity to proclaim the Church as heretical and outlaw them.

Demon Dragon Emperor
A Dragon Emperor from the parallel world, who prior to the start of the series, attempted to conquer humanity. Defeated by the Hunting Hero Kizuna and her allies, his remains are taken and used to forge new weapons. In preparation against Kyo, Naofumi is gifted with part of his dragon core, unwittingly merging it Dragon Emperor Gaelion's core to power up his shield. Now inside the Legendary Shield, the Demon Dragon chooses to bide his time and secretly assists Naofumi in his battle against Kyo.
He makes his presence fully known after Gaelion is possessed by Dragon Emperor Gaelion by hijacking the connection between them and Naofumi and Filo; who had previously powered themselves up using dragon cores. Absorbing power from his victims, he uses Naofumi as medium and takes his strength from the Shield of Wrath; becoming an embodiment of Naofumi's inner darkness called the Wrath Dragon. Upon defeat, no longer able to maintain his physical form, he retreats to the inside of the Legendary Shield and Filo's body, vowing to return should Naofumi allow his rage to take control again.
Seeking counter measures in the fight against the Vanguards of the Waves, Naofumi and Kizuna reluctantly choose to revive the Demon Dragon using the remains of his core, in addition to wanting him to be enslaved and under Kizuna ownership, which would ultimately fail on both accounts. Reborn as a female dragon, the Demon Dragon recognizing the threat at hand agrees to a century long truce with her rivals. Having taking a liking to Naofumi and vowing loyalty solely to him, often sexually harassing him, she shares her knowledge of ancient magic and resources. She later uses her magic to place a copy of her mind within the Legendary Shield to assist Naofumi in casting magic and provide guidance even while in different worlds. Despite their alliance, she unnerves her allies in battle by devouring the souls of fallen enemies and turning their corpses into zombie servants, while also finding great enjoyment in killing those who are inferior to her.

=== Vanguards of the Waves ===
The primary antagonistic force of the series. Founded and led by an unknown leader referred to in legend as a God, the organization seeks power by enforcing the destruction of the Worlds through the Waves by sabotaging and killing the Legendary Heroes who protect them. The bulk of the organization's membership is made up by individuals from other worlds. Unlike the Legendary Heroes who are selectively summoned, these individuals are reincarnated into new bodies allowing them to pass by unnoticed and retain the knowledge of their past lives.
Having been told by their God that they have been chosen to live out new lives, they accept their offer believing themselves to now have a chance at living out their dreams. Believing themselves to be special and having little regard for the original world's inhabitants, they pledge loyalty to their God and are mostly given free rein to live out their new lives. In reality, however, they have been purposely chosen due to the negative personality traits they exhibited in their prior lives making them easy to control.
Viewing the Legendary Heroes as threats to their new lives and statuses, their God gives them a variety of special abilities to counteract them such as being able to steal Legendary Weapons or resurrect themselves so long as their soul remains. Should they, however, attempt to reveal their true selves or information about the organization their bodies and souls are immediately destroyed.

Kyo Ethnina (キョウ＝エスニナ, Kyō Esunina)
Voiced by: Ryōhei Kimura (Japanese); Sean Chiplock (English)
The former Vassal Book Hero. Chosen by his country to wield the Vassal Book, Kyo became a traveling scientist studying the Waves hoping to wield their power for himself. His research leads him to secretly travel to Naofumi's world and prematurely awaken the Guardian Beast known as the Spirit Tortoise.
Taking control of its body, Kyo uses the Spirit Tortoise's power to absorb energy from deceased souls and leads it in a murderous rampage across several kingdoms. Defeating the parties of Motoyasu, Ren, and Itsuki, Kyo imprisons them to steal even more power from their Legendary Weapons. With help from Ost, Naofumi's party and Fitoria succeed in destroying the Spirit Tortoise, forcing him to flee back to his parallel world with the remaining energy he had collected.
Using the Spirit Tortoise's collected energy, Kyo binds his Vassal weapon after it attempts to rebel. Continuing his research, he secretly abducts many adventurers, including the Vassal Mirror Hero, and conducts live-human experiments. Creating an army of familiars and homunculus monsters, he attempts to take over his world. Storming his laboratory, Naofumi's party succeeds in killing him with the Shield of Wrath and the Spirit Tortoise Shield. His soul survives and attempts to possess a homunculus copy of his body, but is devoured by a nearby Soul Eater monster. The Vassal Book and Mirror, free of his control, disappear to find new wielders.
Kyo is later deduced to have been one of the Vanguards of the Waves; a person from a version of Japan who upon his death was reincarnated into Glass's world. In the anime, he was shown to have been a hardcore gamer who committed suicide after his profile in the game he was obsessed with was hacked.

Takt Alsaholn Faubrey (タクト＝アルサホルン＝フォブレイ, Takuto Arusahorun Foburei)
The former Seven Star Whip Hero. A nobleman of Faubrey and having helped his country advance militarily, Takt was labeled as a genius and chosen to wield the Seven Star Whip. Thanks to his status, he created a harem of women followers, many of whom were power-hungry in their own right, and uncovered the method to overcome the regular level cap of the world, as well as brainwash other women into servitude.
Given the ability to steal and use multiple Seven Star & Legendary Weapons by the Vanguards of the Waves, Takt began a power hungry crusade to take over the world. Together with his allies, he secretly assassinated the Seven Star Claw, Axe, Projectile, and Hammer Heroes, and overthrow the entire Faubrey royal family. Later, in an attempt to steal the power of the Legendary Weapons, he secretly interferes with the battle against Guardian Beast Phoenix.
Upon hearing that Takt single-handedly defeated the Guardian Beast Kirin, Naofumi and the Legendary Heroes request an audience with the King of Faubrey, whereby Takt reveals himself; stealing the Legendary Shield, fatally wounding Mirellia, and declaring war on Melromarc.
Having been given temporary possession of the Seven Star Staff, Naofumi and his party use their superior command over the Legendary Weapons to defeat Takt and strip him of his control over his stolen weapons. Captured by Melromarc's allied army, Takt and his followers are tortured and executed. Initially confident he'll be resurrected by his benefactor and take revenge for the deaths of his followers, he eventually relents. Before he is able to reveal the source of his power, however, his head magically explodes with his soul being destroyed.

Hidemasa Miyaji (宮地 秀正, Miyaji Hidemasa)
The former Vassal Musical Instrument Hero. Unintentionally summoned as an extra Hero alongside the Legendary Heroes of the parallel world, Hidemasa's initial lack of a weapon left him in great envy of the Heroes who had and their higher ranking statuses as a result. Disappearing shortly after, he made his reappearance before Kizuna's party as the new Vassal Musical Instrument Hero and nobleman of a country that is in a cold war with L'Arc's kingdom.
Seeking further power, Hidemasa works with the Vanguards of the Waves to kidnap Kizuna while she is on a diplomatic trip, steal the Vassal Boat & Scythe, and personally kill the remaining Legendary Heroes of his world. Confronted by Naofumi, Itsuki, and Glass, he is able to back them into a corner by suppressing the Legendary Shield and Bow. With assistance from the Vassal Mirror and Book, however, Naofumi's party is able to liberate the Vassal Musical Instrument from Hidemasa's control; choosing Itsuki as its new wielder. His power gone, a desperate Hidemasa attempts to steal the Seven Star Axe from Mald but is killed in retaliation with his soul being destroyed.

S'yne's Sister
The Vassal Chain Hero and S'yne's older sister. An unnamed individual, she is one of the higher ups of the Vanguards of the Waves. Little is known about her beyond her direct involvement in the destruction of her home world. Often acting as a commanding officer, she first appeared before Naofumi's party as she and Malty lead an assault on Kizuna's world; successfully kidnapping her and killing the remaining Legendary Heroes of that world.
Unlike most of the members of the Vanguards of the Waves, she is shown to have much cooler demeanor and actively enjoys toying with her opponents; often providing hints to her adversaries or poking holes in her ally's plans. Immensely powerful, she is shown to be able to hold her own against both Naofumi and Kizuna's parties and is able to command the loyalty of her Vassal Weapon without the assistance of Vanguard technology.

== Supporting characters ==
=== Party members / Lurolona Village ===
Keel (キール, Kīru)
Voiced by: Natsumi Fujiwara (Japanese); Kimlinh Tran (English)
Raphtalia's childhood friend, a Dog demi-human. In the web novel she was one of the first batch of slaves from the village that Naofumi bought, while in the light novel she was imprisoned in the dungeon of the noble who'd previously tortured Raphtalia. Initially jealous of Naofumi's relationship with Raphtalia, she comes to view him as an older brother figure giving him the nickname: "Bubba Shield." Wanting to help protect her friends, she asks to join Naofumi's party as well as choosing to become his slave as to take advantage of the stat bonuses of the Legendary Shield. She later becomes the unofficial leader of Naofumi's younger slaves, often poking holes in Naofumi's attempts to act tough and helping train to defend themselves. She also assists in Naofumi's merchant business, dressing up to help attract customers of both genders.
Wanting to be like her Father, Keel initially thought she was a boy; having not learned the differences between genders. It is only after her friends point out her misconception does she come to realize her misunderstanding. Initially distraught, Naofumi comforts her, explaining and reaffirming his belief in gender equality; stating she's still welcome in his party. She later gains the ability to use a Therianthrope form, resembling a puppy. In the anime, Keel appeared to be a male only until revealed as a female much later.

Atla (アトラ, Atora)
Voiced by: Konomi Kohara
A White Tiger demi-human, and sister to Fohl. Blind from birth, she originally suffered from a weak constitution and a multitude of diseases. After being purchased by Naofumi she is given a powerful medicine called Yggdrasil, and boosted by the passive effects of the Legendary Shield, is cured aside from her eyes. Able to sense the kindness in his heart, she falls in love with Naofumi and dedicates herself to winning his heart and helping him fight the Waves.
Adamant and highly assertive, she often tries to micro-manage and speak on Naofumi's behalf, praising those who show him favor and vowing death to his enemies, much to Naofumi's frustration. She sees Raphtalia as her rival and becomes her sparring partner. Able to naturally sense chi to help her see her surroundings, she uses a gentle fist type of martial arts, often imitating the teachings of Hengen Muso. Considered a prodigy, she is able to easily overpower and outmaneuver opponents of greater physical or defensive strength, outshining her brother despite her lack of combat experience and former afflictions.
During the battle against the Guardian Beast Phoenix, Alta sacrifices herself to protect Naofumi and the Coalition Army. Dying in Naofumi's arms, she confesses her love and kisses him, asking for him to be more aware of the feelings of those around him. To Naofumi's surprise, her body subsequently is absorbed into Legendary Shield unlocking the Blessed Shield of Compassion. Atla's soul lingers inside the world of the Legendary Weapon spirits, where she and Ost later appeared to explain to Naofumi the nature of the one behind the Waves.

Imiya Leuthurn Reethela Teleti Kuwariz (イミア＝リュスルン＝リーセラ＝テレティ＝クーアリーズ, Imia Ryusurun Rīsera Tereti Kuārīzu)
One of the slaves Naofumi purchased to repopulate the village and a member of the mole-like demi-human race known as Lumo. Imiya was selected by Naofumi due to her race's reputation for being good at doing detailed work and began learning accessory-making. Initially quite timid, her fellow villagers are able to bring her out of her shell as Naofumi is able to reunite her with her Uncle. Under Naofumi's direct instruction, Imiya comes to excel at accessory-making to the extent that Naofumi and Therese acknowledge she has potentially surpassed her teacher. It is also implied that she has developed a crush on Naofumi.

Wyndia (ウィンディア, Uindia)
A Dog-type demi-human with a fondness for monsters, particularly dragons, whom Naofumi purchased to repopulate the village. Wyndia was initially raised by the Dragon Emperor Gaelion until he was killed by Ren and his party. She was later found by the nearby villagers, with her remaining Dragon family being killed and herself being sold into slavery. Without Naofumi's knowledge, she helped to gather additional monsters for the village, and when Naofumi found out, Wyndia tried to deny that there were more monsters by standing directly in front of one in vain, leading Naofumi to briefly refer to her as "Valley Girl" as a reference to an anime he'd seen.
Taking an interest in the dragon egg gifted to Naofumi, Wyndia named it Gaelion when he hatched, after her adoptive father, and becoming his caretaker. Wyndia is unaware that the current Gaelion also contains that consciousness of her deceased father; having made Naofumi promise not to reveal his existence. Along with Ratotille, Wyndia looks after most of the village's monsters and maintains a rocky relationship with Ren, who tries to make amends with her for killing her the original Gaelion.

Ratotille Anthreya (ラトティル＝アンスレイア, Ratotiru Ansureia)
A monster researcher and alchemist from Faubrey who came to the village after being exiled due to being unwilling to fall under Takt's sway.

Gaelion ((ガエリオン Gaerion)
A dragon that was hatched and raised by Naofumi from an egg gifted to him by an anonymous source from another nation.

Ruftmilia (ルフトミラ, Rufutomira)
Raphtalia's cousin, who is the former Heavenly Emperor of Q'Ten Lo who was used by Makina as a puppet-ruler.

=== Melromarc ===
Erhard (エルハルト, Eruharuto)
Voiced by: Hiroki Yasumoto (Japanese); Imari Williams (English)
The local blacksmith of Castletown, Erhard was originally an adventurer, making a living by traveling around and hunting monsters. One day, Erhard met a blacksmith and was enchanted by the weapons he made. Giving up on being an adventurer, he and another student became apprentices to the blacksmith; though their apprenticeship was left incomplete due to their womanizing Master disappearing. Years later, Erhard settled down in Melomarc, and opened his own blacksmith shop in the castle town.
Erhard first met Naofumi after Malty brought him to his shop and became fond of the boy's haggling for lower prices. Upon hearing of Naofumi's purported crimes, he became very angry and went to confront him, pulling Naofumi aside. Noting his demeanor, however, Erhard realizes Naofumi's innocence and gives him a bag of basic equipment to help him survive. Being the first person to believe Naofumi, he comes to hold Erhard in high regard. Seeking his advice and providing him business whenever he can, Naofumi comes to view his skills as a blacksmith almost second to none; often unsuccessfully asking him to relocate to this village. He later joins Naofumi's party in their journey to Q'Ten Lo, seeking to reunite with his Master and complete his apprenticeship, as well as have him repay the debts Erhard was saddled with when he left.

Beloukas (ベローカス, Berōkasu)
Voiced by: Kenichi Ogata (Japanese); Frank Todaro (English)
A cunning merchant who deals in selling wild monsters and slaves in Melromarc's black market, referred to only as the Slave Trader in most media. Seeking to take advantage of Naofumi's situation and profit off the reputation of a Legendary Hero, he approaches Naofumi and convinces him to purchase as a slave in helping him raise his levels; particularly noting that a slave cannot lie to him.
Selling Raphtalia and later Filo to him, Beloukas is able to expand his business throughout the black market. Disgusted by his greed and dislike of being used, Naofumi tries to keep his interactions with Beloukas as transactional as possible but often turns to his assistance when gathering information or seeking out the displaced residents of Raphtalia's original village. It is later shown that he also works with and has family throughout the many countries of the world including demi-human nations all of whom bare a striking resemblance to one-another. He is shown to be unbiased when it comes to slaves, even when a new batch of them he was presented with were former slavers.

Melty Q. Melromarc (メルティ＝Q＝メルロマルク, Meruti Meruromaruku)
Voiced by: Maaya Uchida (Japanese); Jackie Lastra (English)
The second princess and heir to Melromarc's throne. Unlike her older sister, she is good-natured and kind. She holds extreme fondness for Filolials and quickly becomes Filo's best friend. Initially, Naofumi assumed she was like her sister, ignoring her attempts to have him repair relations with her father. Only after being nearly assassinated by her sister and the same knights who protected her, Naofumi accepts her as an ally, offering his protection. She later leaves Naofumi's party to focus on her responsibilities to her kingdom.
Melty specializes in water magic and is a skilled diplomat, having traveled the world with her mother. Often teasing her young age, Naofumi respects her wisdom and governing ability and hopes to leave Filo in her care should he return home. To her embarrassment, she is egged on by her mother to try and marry him, believing their marriage would bring peace with demi-human nations. After her mother's death, she is crowned as the new Queen.

Mirellia Q. Melromarc (ミレリア＝Q＝メルロマルク, Mireria Meromaruku)
Voiced by: Kikuko Inoue (Japanese); Katelyn Gault (English)
The Queen Regnant of Melromarc. Initially away at the start of the series on a diplomatic tour of the world, Mirellia returns to help the Legendary Heroes defeat the Church of the Three Heroes. Furious at her husband and eldest daughter for their crimes, she disowns them and revokes their nobility as punishment. Outlawing the Church of the Three Heroes, she wishes to make things right with Naofumi and does her best to support him.
Specializing in ice magic, Mirellia is a skilled diplomat and politician and employs several ninja-like bodyguards called "Shadows" to keep watch on each of the Heroes. Naofumi comes to hold deep respect for her, having successfully convinced him to punish her family in other ways in lieu of the death penalty and noting the lack of international stability in Kizuna's world. Unlike most of Melromarc's citizens, she holds no prejudice towards demi-humans and tries her best to improve relations by setting up demi-human friendly provinces and promising her late middle son's hand in marriage to Siltvelt. Despite their mistakes, she still loves her family and even goes as far as offering to take her life in-exchange for Naofumi's help in fighting the Waves; which he turns down. Mirellia later issues orders for Malty's arrest after she abandons Motoyasu during the battle with the Spirit Tortoise.
Joining the Heroes in their investigation of the aftermath of the Guardian Beast Phoenix battle, Mirellia is killed in an ambush arranged by Takt and Malty. Using the last of her strength, she asks her husband to put aside his differences with Naofumi and reclaim his role as the Staff Hero, which he eventually does.

Elrasla Ragnarok (エルラスラ＝ラグラロック, Erurasura Ragurarokku)
Voiced by: Maki Izawa (Japanese); Barbara Goodson (English)
An aged-yet-vigorous user of the Hengen Muso style of martial arts, who is referred to mostly as the Hengen Muso Lady. She is a former adventurer and the last practitioner of the Hengen Muso style; a style of martial arts that utilizes Life Force energy in combat.
Elrasla first met Naofumi while ill and on her death bed, having been brought to her by her son. Naofumi is not only able to cure her illness but also restores much of her youthful vigor, allowing her to participate during the third Wave. Queen Mirellia later commissions Elrasla to train the Heroes and their parties to boost their strength, though only Naofumi's party and Eclair follow through learning Hengen Muso under her instruction. Elrasla takes particular interest in Rishia, whom she discerns to have a rare talent for the Hengen Muso style and takes her on as her apprentice. Soon after, she is hired by Naofumi to become a regular instructor in his village, helping train his slaves to defend themselves.

Eclair Seaetto (エクレール＝セーアエット, Ekurēru Sēatto)
Voiced by: Ruriko Aoki (Japanese); Dawn M. Bennett (English)
A Noblewoman and Knight of Melromarc. The daughter of a nobleman selected by Mirellia to watch over a demi-human friendly province. Shortly after the first Wave, of which her father fell victim to, she conducted her own investigation into the Royal Knights that had enslaved Raphtalia's village but was charged with treason and imprisoned by the Church of the Three Heroes. Upon Mirellia's return, she is released and tasked with helping train the Legendary Heroes' Parties; though only Naofumi's party take her instruction seriously.
Appointed to look after her late father's territory, she and Naofumi often argue with each other over her greater interest in training instead of governing and Naofumi's morals. Despite this, Naofumi respects her as a swordswoman, being able to outmatch foes of higher levels such as Raphtalia and Ren using skill alone.

=== Other characters ===
Therese Alexanderite (テリス＝アレキサンドライト, Terisu Arekisandoraito)
Voiced by: Saori Hayami (Japanese); Erika Harlacher (English)
L'Arc's companion and member of Kizuna's party. Traveling together with L'Arc to defeat the Legendary Heroes and save their parallel world, she meets Naofumi's party on their way to the Cal Mira islands to train. She unwittingly befriends Naofumi, believing him to be a good person unlike the circulating rumors about the Shield Hero being a criminal. She regretfully joins L'Arc & Glass in their fight against Naofumi's party during the Cal Mira Wave. Along with the rest of her party members, she joins Naofumi in the fight against Kyo.
A member of a race known as Jewels, Therese was born with a large gemstone on her head. Her heritage allows to her communicate with special gemstones and receive power from them: being able to cast offensive magic that doesn't harm allies. Generally a reserved individual, she comes to obsess over Naofumi's crafting abilities and enjoys watching him at work. Her obliviousness to L'Arc's crush on her later leads to a one-sided rivalry between him and Naofumi. Therese does not appear in the web novel.

Ost Horai (オスト＝ホウライ, Osuto Hōrai)
Voiced by: Kana Hanazawa (Japanese); Amber Lee Connors (English)
A human-type familiar of the Spirit Tortoise, whose intended purpose was to pave the way for the Spirit Tortoise's awakening by manipulating nations into war and gathering souls of the recently deceased to power a defensive barrier against the Waves.
When Kyo prematurely unsealed the Spirit Tortoise's power and began controlling it to go on a rampage, Ost approached Naofumi to ask for his aid in killing it, even knowing this would end her life as well. Accompanying the Shield Hero's party into the Spirit Tortoise, Ost assists in navigating the way to the Guardian Beast's heart, using gravity magic and limited control over other familiars to hasten their progress. Inside the Beast's core, the group fight Kyo but are almost overwhelmed, with Ost guiding Naofumi in Liberation class support magic and unlocking the Spirit Tortoise Shield for him so that he could destroy its heart.
As she lay dying, Ost confirmed Naofumi's suspicion that she was in fact a manifestation of the Spirit Tortoise itself, and was content in knowing that while her job meant that she was to die hated and alone, she made true friends that would mourn for her loss. With Kyo having escaped to his home world with the energy taken by the Spirit Tortoise, Ost uses her authority as a Guardian Beast to allow Naofumi to travel between worlds to reclaim it before fading away. Naofumi and his party soon fulfill their promise to Ost by defeating Kyo and releasing the stolen energy back into the world.
Ost's soul lingers inside the world of the Legendary Weapon spirits, where she and Atla later appeared to explain to Naofumi the nature of the one behind the Waves.

Yomogi Emarl (ヨモギ＝エーマール, Yomogi Ēmāru)
Voiced by: Maki Kawase (Japanese); Kimberly Woods (English)
A person full of strong sense of justice, forthcoming, and self-righteousness, Yomogi, residing in Kizuna's world, was Kyo Ethina's childhood friend and travelling companion who takes it upon herself to assist him in what she believed to be stopping the waves. After her sword given to by Kyo explodes when she first engages in a fight against Naofumi and Kizuna's parties as part of her mission given by Kyo to kill Naofumi and Raphtalia, she began to question her motives and decides to uncover the truth of Kyo, until she soon discovers his real intentions when the Wave of Catastrophe activates prematurely. After Kyo's death at the hands of Naofumi, she has since worked with Kizuna to fight against the waves.
