= List of The Rising of the Shield Hero episodes =

The Rising of the Shield Hero is an anime television series based on the light novel series of the same title written by Aneko Yusagi. The first season is produced by Kinema Citrus and directed by Takao Abo, with Keigo Koyanagi handling composition, Masahiro Suwa designing the characters, and Kevin Penkin composing the music. The season aired from January 9 to June 26, 2019, on AT-X and other networks. It ran for 25 episodes. The anime series is licensed by Crunchyroll in North America.

At 2019's Crunchyroll Expo, it was announced that the series would receive a second and third season. Then later at 2020's virtual Crunchyroll Expo, it was originally announced that the second season would premiere in October 2021, but it was later delayed by 6 months. The second season aired from April 6 to June 29, 2022, on AT-X and other networks. Masato Jinbo replaced Takao Abo as series director, and the rest of the staff members reprised their roles, with production by Kinema Citrus and DR Movie. The second season ran for 13 episodes. Crunchyroll announced that the second season's English dub would begin streaming on May 4.

The third season aired from October 6 to December 22, 2023. Hitoshi Haga, who directed and storyboarded episodes from the first season, replaced Jinbo as series director, with the rest of the main staff reprising their roles. Alfredo Sirica and Natalie Jeffreys serve as additional music composers alongside Kevin Penkin for the third season. On October 19, 2023, Crunchyroll announced that the third season would begin airing its dub the following day.

In January 2024, it was announced that a fourth season was in production, which aired from July 9 to September 24, 2025. The opening theme song is "Resolution", performed by Madkid, and the ending theme song is "Eien ni Ikkai no" (永遠に一回の), performed by Chiai Fujikawa. Hitoshi Haga reprises his role as series director. The series composition is handled by Keigo Koyanagi, character design by Franziska van Wulfen, Sana Komatsu and Masahiro Suwa, and soundtrack by Kevin Penkin, Alfredo Sirica and Natalie Jeffreys. Crunchyroll is streaming the dub in the same day the season aired.

Following the fourth season finale, a fifth season was announced. It is set to premiere in 2027.

== Series overview ==
Season	Episodes	Originally released	
Season	Episodes	First released	Last released
1	25	January 9, 2019	June 26, 2019
2	13	April 6, 2022	June 29, 2022
3	12	October 6, 2023	December 22, 2023
4	12	July 9, 2025	September 24, 2025

== Episodes ==
=== Season 1 (2019) ===
No. overall	No. in season	Title	Directed by	Written by	Storyboarded by	Original release date
1	1	"The Shield Hero"; Transliteration: "Tate no Yūsha" (Japanese: 盾の勇者)	Hitoshi Haga	Keigo Koyanagi	Takao Abo	January 9, 2019
2	2	"The Slave Girl"; Transliteration: "Dorei no Shōjo" (Japanese: 奴隷の少女)	Seung-hui Son	Ohine Ezaki	Seung-hui Son	January 16, 2019
3	3	"Wave of Catastrophe"; Transliteration: "Saiyaku no Nami" (Japanese: 災厄の波)	Satoshi Mori	Ohine Ezaki	Satoshi Mori	January 23, 2019
4	4	"Lullaby at Dawn"; Transliteration: "Akatsuki no Komoriuta" (Japanese: 暁の子守唄)	Seung-hui Son	Ohine Ezaki	Takao Abo, Yuka Kuroda	January 30, 2019
5	5	"Filo"; Transliteration: "Fīro" (Japanese: フィーロ)	Toshiharu Kudō	Daisuke Tazawa	Hitoshi Haga	February 6, 2019
6	6	"A New Comrade"; Transliteration: "Atarashii Nakama" (Japanese: 新しい仲間)	Shigeki Awai	Daisuke Tazawa	Hidetoshi Namura	February 13, 2019
7	7	"The Savior of the Heavenly Fowl"; Transliteration: "Shinchō no Seijin" (Japanese: 神鳥の聖人)	Yūji Tokuno	Daisuke Tazawa	Seung-hui Son, Yuka Kuroda	February 20, 2019
8	8	"Curse Shield"; Transliteration: "Noroi no Tate" (Japanese: 呪いの盾)	Hitoshi Haga	Daisuke Tazawa	Hitoshi Haga	February 27, 2019
9	9	"Melty"; Transliteration: "Meruti" (Japanese: メルティ)	Toshiharu Kudō	Ohine Ezaki	Toshiharu Kudō, Kōji Furukuwa	March 6, 2019
10	10	"In the Midst of Turmoil"; Transliteration: "Konmei no Naka de" (Japanese: 混迷の中で)	Jun Takahashi	Ohine Ezaki	Takao Abo	March 13, 2019
11	11	"Catastrophe Returns"; Transliteration: "Saiyaku, Futatabi" (Japanese: 災厄、再び)	Hodaka Kuramoto	Daisuke Tazawa	Erukin Kawabata	March 20, 2019
12	12	"The Raven Invader"; Transliteration: "Shikkoku no Ihōsha" (Japanese: 漆黒の異邦者)	Shigeki Awai	Daisuke Tazawa	Yasuhiro Irie	March 27, 2019
13	13	"The Devil of the Shield"; Transliteration: "Tate no Akuma" (Japanese: 盾の悪魔)	Hitoshi Haga	Ohine Ezaki	Hitoshi Haga	April 3, 2019
14	14	"Everlasting Memory"; Transliteration: "Kesenai Kioku" (Japanese: 消せない記憶)	Naoki Murata	Ohine Ezaki	Hidetoshi Namura	April 10, 2019
15	15	"Raphtalia"; Transliteration: "Rafutaria" (Japanese: ラフタリア)	Toshiharu Kudō	Ohine Ezaki	Takao Abo	April 17, 2019
16	16	"Filolial Queen"; Transliteration: "Firoriaru no Joō" (Japanese: フィロリアルの女王)	Ryū Nakayama	Ryū Nakayama	Ryū Nakayama	April 24, 2019
17	17	"A Promise Made"; Transliteration: "Tsumugareru Yakusoku" (Japanese: 紡がれる約束)	Hodaka Kuramoto	Katsuji Yatsushige, Keigo Koyanagi	Tatsuhiko Komatsu	May 1, 2019
18	18	"A Conspiracy Linked"; Transliteration: "Tsuranaru Inbō" (Japanese: 連なる陰謀)	Naoki Murata	Daisuke Tazawa	Hitoshi Haga, Tatsuhiko Komatsu	May 8, 2019
19	19	"The Four Cardinal Heroes"; Transliteration: "Shisei Yūsha" (Japanese: 四聖勇者)	Hitoshi Haga	Daisuke Tazawa	Hitoshi Haga	May 15, 2019
20	20	"Battle of Good and Evil"; Transliteration: "Seija Kessen" (Japanese: 聖邪決戦)	Takuma Suzuki	Daisuke Tazawa	Takao Abo, Yuka Kuroda	May 22, 2019
21	21	"Naofumi's Triumphant Return"; Transliteration: "Naofumi no Gaisen" (Japanese: 尚文の凱旋)	Takao Abo	Keigo Koyanagi	Takao Abo	May 29, 2019
22	22	"Four Heroes Council"; Transliteration: "Yūsha Kaigi" (Japanese: 勇者会議)	Kōji Furukuwa	Ohine Ezaki	Kōji Furukuwa	June 5, 2019
23	23	"Cal Mira Archipelago"; Transliteration: "Karu Mira-tō" (Japanese: カルミラ島)	Toshiharu Kudō	Daisuke Tazawa	Toshiharu Kudō	June 12, 2019
24	24	"Guardians of Another World"; Transliteration: "Isekai no Shugosha" (Japanese: 異世界の守護者)	Takanori Yamamoto, Takuma Suzuki	Daisuke Tazawa	Yuka Kuroda, Hidetoshi Namura	June 19, 2019
25	25	"The Rising of the Shield Hero"; Transliteration: "Tate no Yūsha no Nariagari" (Japanese: 盾の勇者の成り上がり)	Shinpei Wada, Kōji Furukuwa, Takao Abo	Keigo Koyanagi	Takao Abo	June 26, 2019

=== Season 2 (2022) ===
No. overall	No. in season	Title	Directed by	Chief animation directed by	Original release date
26	1	"A New Roar"; Transliteration: "Arata na Hōkō" (Japanese: 新たな咆哮)	Directed by : Masato Jinbo; Storyboarded by : Masato Jinbo & Mayu Hirotomi	Masahiro Suwa	April 6, 2022
27	2	"Footprints of the Spirit Tortoise"; Transliteration: "Reiki no Ashiato" (Japanese: 霊亀の足跡)	Takahiro Hirata	Kōta Sera	April 13, 2022
28	3	"Shaking Land"; Transliteration: "Yureru Daichi" (Japanese: 揺れる大地)	Directed by : Tomonori Mine; Storyboarded by : Kahoru Fujiki	Masahiro Suwa	April 20, 2022
29	4	"Ruins in the Fog"; Transliteration: "Muchū no Iseki" (Japanese: 霧中の遺跡)	Mayu Hirotomi	Kōta Sera	April 27, 2022
30	5	"Ost Hourai"; Transliteration: "Osuto Hōrai" (Japanese: オスト＝ホウライ)	Takahiro Hirata	Masahiro Suwa	May 4, 2022
31	6	"Racing to Catch Up"; Transliteration: "Okkake" (Japanese: 追駆)	Directed by : Takuma Suzuki; Storyboarded by : Masayuki Kojima, Tomoko Hiramuki & Takuma Suzuki	Kōta Sera & Masahiro Suwa	May 11, 2022
32	7	"Infinite Labyrinth"; Transliteration: "Mugenmeikyū" (Japanese: 無限迷宮)	Ippei Ichii	Kōta Sera & Masahiro Suwa	May 18, 2022
33	8	"A Parting in the Snow"; Transliteration: "Yuki no Wakare" (Japanese: 雪の別れ)	Directed by : Min Sun Kim; Storyboarded by : Hideaki Uehara	Masahiro Suwa, Kōta Sera & Jin Woo Woo	May 25, 2022
34	9	"Humming Fairy"; Transliteration: "Hamingu Fērī" (Japanese: ハミングフェーリー)	Marina Maki	Masahiro Suwa	June 1, 2022
35	10	"Katana Hero"; Transliteration: "Katana no Yūsha" (Japanese: 刀の勇者)	Takahiro Hirata	Masahiro Suwa & Kōta Sera	June 8, 2022
36	11	"Kizuna" (Japanese: 絆)	Directed by : Jeong Hee Yang & Yang Ho Ji; Storyboarded by : Ippei Ichii	Masahiro Suwa & Jin Woo Woo	June 15, 2022
37	12	"Reason to Fight"; Transliteration: "Tatakau Riyū" (Japanese: 戦う理由)	Daigo Yamagishi	Masahiro Suwa & Kōta Sera	June 22, 2022
38	13	"Flowers Offered in Recollection"; Transliteration: "Tsuioku no Kenka" (Japanese: 追憶の献花)	Directed by : Muneki Ogasawara, Sakumi Inoha, Masatsugu Arakawa & Daigo Yamagishi; Storyboarded by : Masayuki Kojima, Yōhei, Shingo Kaneko, Daigo Yamagishi & Sakumi Inoha	Masahiro Suwa, Kōta Sera & Ga Young Park	June 29, 2022

=== Season 3 (2023) ===
No. overall	No. in season	Title	Directed by	Written by	Chief animation directed by	Original release date
39	1	"The Dark Coliseum"; Transliteration: "Yami no Koroshiamu" (Japanese: 闇のコロシアム)	Hitoshi Haga	Keigo Koyanagi	Sana Komatsu	October 6, 2023
40	2	"Nadia" (Japanese: ナディア)	Directed by : Motohiko Niwa; Storyboarded by : Hiroshi Yoneda	Keigo Koyanagi	Sana Komatsu & Yuka Kuroda	October 13, 2023
41	3	"The White Tiger Siblings"; Transliteration: "Hakuko no Kyōdai" (Japanese: ハクコの兄妹)	Directed by : Shunsuke Kishi; Storyboarded by : Masayuki Kojima	Takuya Asahina	Sana Komatsu, Yuka Kuroda & Franziska van Wulfen	October 20, 2023
42	4	"The Operation to Capture the Spear Hero"; Transliteration: "Yari no Yūsha Hokaku Sakusen" (Japanese: 槍の勇者捕獲作戦)	Shunsuke Takarai	Akiko Waba	Sana Komatsu & Franziska van Wulfen	October 27, 2023
43	5	"Each of Their Paths"; Transliteration: "Sorezore no Michi" (Japanese: それぞれの道)	Directed by : Takanori Yamamoto; Storyboarded by : Hitoshi Haga	Momoka Toyoda	Sana Komatsu & Franziska van Wulfen	November 3, 2023
44	6	"Where You Point Your Strength"; Transliteration: "Tsuyo-sa no Hokosaki" (Japanese: 強さの矛先)	Directed by : Motohiko Niwa; Storyboarded by : Youhei	Momoka Toyoda	Sana Komatsu, Yuka Kuroda & Franziska van Wulfen	November 10, 2023
45	7	"The Girl and the Dragon"; Transliteration: "Shōjo to Doragon" (Japanese: 少女とドラゴン)	Directed by : Min Kyung Hee; Storyboarded by : Hitoshi Haga	Ohine Ezaki	Sana Komatsu	November 17, 2023
46	8	"Dragon's Den"; Transliteration: "Ryū no Su" (Japanese: 竜の巣)	Directed by : Testuro Tanaka; Storyboarded by : Shingo Kaneko & Tetsuro Tanaka	Ohine Ezaki	Sana Komatsu, Yuka Kuroda & Franziska van Wulfen	November 24, 2023
47	9	"Emperor Dragon"; Transliteration: "Ma Ryū" (Japanese: 魔竜)	Directed by : Takanori Yamamoto & Yuuto Ooizumi; Storyboarded by : Hiroshi Yoneda & Huang Jiawen	Ohine Ezaki	Sana Komatsu, Yuka Kuroda & Franziska van Wulfen	December 1, 2023
48	10	"Perfect Hidden Justice"; Transliteration: "Pāfekuto Haido Jasutisu" (Japanese: パーフェクト = ハイド = ジャスティス)	Directed by : Arisa Shima, Toshisuke Kishi & Akemi Kabata; Storyboarded by : Yusuke Kubo	Akiko Waba	Sana Komatsu, Yuka Kuroda & Franziska van Wulfen	December 8, 2023
49	11	"Justice VS Justice"; Transliteration: "Seigi tai Seigi" (Japanese: 正義 VS 正義)	Daiki Yonemori	Akiko Waba	Sana Komatsu, Yuka Kuroda & Franziska van Wulfen	December 15, 2023
50	12	"The Ones We Must Protect"; Transliteration: "Mamorubeki Mono-tachi" (Japanese: 守るべき者達)	Directed by : Wataru Arakawa; Storyboarded by : Yoshiaki Okumura	Keigo Koyanagi	Sana Komatsu, Yuka Kuroda & Franziska van Wulfen	December 22, 2023

=== Season 4 (2025) ===
No. overall	No. in season	Title	Directed by	Written by	Chief animation directed by	Original release date
51	1	"Siltvelt"; Transliteration: "Shirutoveruto" (Japanese: シルトヴェルト)	Takanori Yamamoto	Keigo Koyanagi	Franziska van Wulfen	July 9, 2025
52	2	"Official Welcome"; Transliteration: "Kantai" (Japanese: 歓待)	Wataru Arakawa	Mika Tanaka	Franziska van Wulfen & Masahiro Suwa	July 16, 2025
53	3	"A True People"; Transliteration: "Shinnaru Min to wa" (Japanese: 真なる民とは)	Directed by : Wataru Arakawa & Motohiko Niwa; Storyboarded by : Takanori Yamamoto	Akiko Waba	Franziska van Wulfen & Masahiro Suwa	July 23, 2025
54	4	"Entrusted Power"; Transliteration: "Takusa-reta Chikara" (Japanese: 託された力)	Directed by : Hitoshi Haga, Xingwen Yao & Hiroki Yamamoto; Storyboarded by : Huang Jiawen	Ohine Ezaki	Sana Komatsu, Masahiro Suwa & Franziska van Wulfen	July 30, 2025
55	5	"White Tiger"; Transliteration: "Hakuko" (Japanese: 白虎(ハクコ))	Directed by : Motohiko Niwa; Storyboarded by : Daiki Yonemori & Shingo Kaneko	Keigo Koyanagi	Sana Komatsu & Franziska van Wulfen	August 6, 2025
56	6	"Leaving Port"; Transliteration: "Shukkō" (Japanese: 出港)	Wataru Arakawa	Satoshi Ōshio	Sana Komatsu & Masahiro Suwa	August 13, 2025
57	7	"Arriving in Q'ten Lo"; Transliteration: "Ku'ten Rou Jōriku" (Japanese: クテンロウ上陸)	Takanori Yamamoto	Satoshi Ōshio	Franziska van Wulfen	August 20, 2025
58	8	"Orochi" (Japanese: 大蛇)	Directed by : Kazuho Kunimoto, Takehiro Kubota, Masahiro Suwa & Hitoshi Haga; Storyboarded by : Tetsuro Tanaka & Hidetoshi Namura	Keigo Koyanagi	Sana Komatsu & Masahiro Suwa	August 27, 2025
59	9	"Zodia" (Japanese: ゾディア)	Directed by : Hitoshi Haga & Haruka Watanabe; Storyboarded by : Hitoshi Haga	Mika Tanaka	Franziska van Wulfen	September 3, 2025
60	10	"Prayer"; Transliteration: "Inori" (Japanese: 祈り)	Directed by : Se-Ting Liang; Storyboarded by : Yusuke Kubo	Yoshikazu Tominaga	Sana Komatsu, Masahiro Suwa & Kōta Sera	September 10, 2025
61	11	"Oracle Miko"; Transliteration: "Shintaku no Miko" (Japanese: 神託の巫女)	Directed by : Xiaoyue Zhu; Storyboarded by : Hidetoshi Namura & Toshihiko Masuda	Ohine Ezaki	Masahiro Suwa & Sana Komatsu	September 17, 2025
62	12	"Return of the Emperor"; Transliteration: "Tenmei no Kikan" (Japanese: 天命の帰還)	Takanori Yamamoto	Keigo Koyanagi	Sana Komatsu, Franziska van Wulfen & Masahiro Suwa	September 24, 2025
