= Yuyushiki =

Japanese manga series

- Cover of first manga volume featuring the main characters (from left to right): Yui Ichii, Yuzuko Nonohara and Yukari Hinata.

ゆゆ式
- Genre: Comedy, slice of life
- Manga
- Written by: Komata Mikami
- Published by: Houbunsha
- Magazine: Manga Time Kirara
- Original run: April 2008 – present
- Volumes: 15
- Anime television series
- Directed by: Kaori
- Written by: Natsuko Takahashi
- Music by: Asuka Sakai
- Studio: Kinema Citrus
- Licensed by: NA: Sentai Filmworks
- Original network: Tokyo MX, SUN-TV, KBS, tvk, TV Aichi, AT-X, BS11, Anime Network
- Original run: April 9, 2013 – June 26, 2013
- Episodes: 12
- Original video animation

Annoying and Being Annoyed
- Directed by: Kaori
- Written by: Natsuko Takahashi
- Music by: Asuka Sakai
- Studio: Kinema Citrus
- Released: February 22, 2017

Yuyushiki (Japanese: ゆゆ式) is a Japanese 4-panel manga series written and illustrated by Komata Mikami, which began serialization in Houbunsha's Manga Time Kirara magazine from April 2008 issue. An anime television adaptation by Kinema Citrus aired in Japan between April and June 2013. An original video animation was released on February 22, 2017. The series' name is derived from the term "yuyushiki jitai" (由々しき事態, lit. "in a serious situation").

== Plot ==
The series follows the daily lives of three high school girls: the intelligent but childish Yuzuko, the kind but airheaded Yukari, and the mature and easily irritated Yui, who are all part of their school's Data Processing Club (情報処理部, Jōhōshori-bu). As the girls spend their days having meaningless discussions, they occasionally come up with topics to research while in their clubroom.

== Characters ==
Yuzuko Nonohara (野々原 ゆずこ, Nonohara Yuzuko)
Voiced by: Rumi Ōkubo
The first member of the Data Processing Club. Her nature is usually innocent, but will sometimes break out into outrageous bouts. Despite her dimwitted demeanour and crazy ideas, she is actually quite intelligent when it comes to the studies.
Yukari Hinata (日向 縁, Hinata Yukari)
Voiced by: Risa Taneda
The second member of the Data Processing Club and its president. A generally light headed girl who will often copy Yuzuko's antics if she finds them amusing. She comes from a rich family and was friends with Yui in elementary school.
Yui Ichii (櫟井 唯, Ichii Yui)
Voiced by: Minami Tsuda
The third member of the Data Processing Club. A generally serious girl who often serves as the straight person to the antics of Yuzuko and Yukari, who often like to tease her.
Yoriko Matsumoto (松本 頼子, Matsumoto Yoriko)
Voiced by: Yui Horie
The girls' homeroom teacher and advisor of the Data Processing Club. She is often called "Mom" (お母さん, Okā-san) by her students due to her generally kind nature.
Chiho Aikawa (相川 千穂, Aikawa Chiho)
Voiced by: Ai Kayano
A classmate of the girls and the class president. She is a quiet girl who admires Yui a lot and wants to become friends with her, but is usually intimidated by Yuzuko and Yukari's antics.
Kei Okano (岡野 佳, Okano Kei)
Voiced by: Megumi Han
A classmate of the girls and Chiho's friend. She is quite fond of Chiho and is often cold towards Yui for allegedly taking Chiho away from her.
Fumi Hasegawa (長谷川 ふみ, Hasegawa Fumi)
Voiced by: Mana Shimizu
A classmate of the girls and Chiho and Kei's friend. She is aware of Kei's fondness for Chiho and often teases her about it.

== Media ==
=== Manga ===
The original manga by Komata Mikami began serialization in Houbunsha's Manga Time Kirara magazine from April 2008. The first tankōbon volume of the manga was released March 26, 2009, and fifteen volumes have been published as of September 27, 2025.

No.	Release date	ISBN
1	March 26, 2009	978-4-8322-7794-6
2	February 27, 2010	978-4-8322-7892-9
3	March 26, 2011	978-4-8322-4006-3
4	March 27, 2012	978-4-8322-4126-8
5	April 26, 2013	978-4-8322-4287-6
6	May 27, 2014	978-4-8322-4442-9
7	May 27, 2015	978-4-8322-4570-9
8	June 27, 2016	978-4-8322-4708-6
9	August 26, 2017	978-4-8322-4865-6
10	January 25, 2019	978-4-8322-7061-9
11	August 27, 2020	978-4-8322-7208-8
12	November 26, 2021	978-4-8322-7321-4
13	March 27, 2023	978-4-8322-7446-4
14	July 25, 2024	978-4-8322-9561-2
15	September 27, 2025	978-4-8322-9665-7

=== Anime ===
The anime television adaptation is produced by Kinema Citrus and is directed by Kaori. Series composition is done by Natsuko Takahashi and character design by Hisayuki Tabata. The series aired between April 9 and June 26, 2013, and was simulcast with by Crunchyroll. The opening theme is "One Two!" (せーのっ!, Sēno!) by Rumi Ōkubo, Risa Taneda and Minami Tsuda, while the ending theme is "Affection" by Mayumi Morinaga. Sentai Filmworks licensed the series in North America and released it on subtitled DVD on July 1, 2014. An original video animation episode was released in Japan on February 22, 2017. The opening and ending themes respectively are "Kirameki! no Hi" (きらめきっ！の日, A Sparkling Day!) and "Aozora no Tsukurikata" (青空のつくりかた, How to Make a Blue Sky), both performed by Ōkubo, Tsuda, and Taneda. In March 17, 2026, the anime debuted on the HIDIVE platform, with Comic Book stating that the series had yet to be "renewed for a second season".

==== Episode list ====
No.	Title	Original release date
1	"Now We're High School Students" "Kōkōsei ni Narimashita" (高校生になりました)	April 9, 2013
Yuzuko Nonohara, Yukari Hinata, and Yui Ichii begin their first day at high school before visiting a few shops around town. Noticing the Data Processing Club is rendered memberless, the girls check out the clubroom and spend all day looking up information on the computer.
2	"Data Processing Club" "Jōhōshori-bu" (情報処理部)	April 16, 2013
Following an odd discussion about breasts, Yui points out that their class representative, Chiho Aikawa, doesn't seem to get along with Yuzuko and Yukari due to their constant teasing. Feeling they are more or less an official club, the others decide to nominate Yukari as the president. Later, as the summer heat gets to everyone, the girls look up various facts about ice-cream.
3	"It's Summer Vacation!" "Natsu Yasumi Jāi!" (夏休みじゃーい!)	April 23, 2013
It's summer vacation and the girls visit the pool and hang around before having a sleepover at Yui's house. Later, Yukari goes on a trip to an island resort, prompting much conversation between Yui and Yuzuko.
4	"Chairman" "Iinchō" (いいんちょう)	April 30, 2013
The club's advisor, Yoriko Matsumoto, tries to get used to being called "Mom" by her students, whilst the girls look up whale facts. Later, Yui ends up spending the entire night reading a book, leaving her irritable due to lack of sleep. As she eventually collapses and rests in the nurse's office, Chiho feels a sense of joy when she is able to take a photo of her sleeping face.
5	"Yui and Yukari and Yuzuko" "Yui to Yukari to Yuzuko" (唯と縁 とゆずこ)	May 7, 2013
Yui recalls when she and Yukari met each other in elementary school and became friends. The next day, the girls have various discussions, which mostly revolve around death.
6	"First Snow Nabe" "Hatsuyuki Nabe" (初雪なべ)	May 14, 2013
On a particularly cold day, the girls talk about potatoes and look into the days of the week. Later, the girls have a nabe party at Yoriko's apartment after failing to get approval to have it in the clubroom.
7	"3rd Semester!" "San Gakki!" (3学期っ!)	May 21, 2013
As the new year begins, both Yuzuko and Yukari take turns coming over to Yui's house, where they mostly sleep, before coming round together. At the start of the new semester, as Chiho offers to make the girls chocolate, they end up researching about eyes.
8	"We're In Our Second Year Now" "Ninensei ni Narimashita" (2年生になりました)	May 28, 2013
After the girls enter their second year and reminisce about their past year at school, they look up some facts about water. Meanwhile, Chiho's friend Kei Okano, who is usually cold towards Yui due to Chiho's fondness of her, changes her opinion of her after she helps to pay for some snacks at the convenience store. Later, the girls try to get to know Yoriko a little better.
9	"Mish Mash" "Majarinko" (まじゃりんこ)	June 4, 2013
The girls invite Chiho to visit the Data Processing club, where she gets to know Yui a little better. After looking up ogres, the girls decide to go with Chiho and Kei to their friend Fumi Hasegawa's house.
10	"Because It's Fun" "Tanoshii kara" (楽しいから)	June 11, 2013
Yuzuko plays around with some artist dolls before indulging in a little comic artistry herself.
11	"Times Like These" "Kōyū Jikan" (こーゆー時間)	June 18, 2013
The girls look into the various aspects of time, before pondering what they'd like to do in the future.
12	"Uneventful Good Life" "No Event Good Life" (ノーイベントグッドライフ)	June 25, 2013
As summer vacation begins again, the girls spend most of their days at Yui's house, before later going to the beach.
OVA	"Annoying and Being Annoyed" "Komarasetari, Komarasaretari" (困らせたり、困らされたり)	February 22, 2017
Yuzuko and Yukari's routine annoyance of Yui leads the girls to look into the history of teasing others. While visiting the clubroom, Chiho explains how she came to be friends with Kei and Fumi. Later, the girls discuss what they'd like to do during their third school year.

=== Video game ===
Characters from the series appear alongside other Manga Time Kirara characters in the 2017 mobile RPG, Kirara Fantasia.
