= Magimoji Rurumo =

Japanese manga and anime series

- Cover of the first manga volume featuring titular character Rurumo

まじもじるるも (Majimoji Rurumo)
- Genre: Fantasy, slapstick comedy
- Manga
- Written by: Wataru Watanabe
- Published by: Kodansha
- Magazine: Monthly Shōnen Sirius
- Original run: October 2007 – February 2011
- Volumes: 7
- Manga

Magimoji Rurumo: Makai-hen
- Written by: Wataru Watanabe
- Published by: Kodansha
- Magazine: Monthly Shōnen Sirius
- Original run: April 2011 – March 2013
- Volumes: 5
- Manga

Magimoji Rurumo: Hōkago no Mahō Chugakusei
- Written by: Wataru Watanabe
- Published by: Kodansha
- Magazine: Monthly Shōnen Sirius
- Original run: July 2013 – June 2019
- Volumes: 9
- Anime television series
- Directed by: Chikara Sakurai
- Produced by: Noritomo Isogai; Youhei Itou; Yuuichi Izumi; Gorou Shinjuku; Yoshifumi Yarimizu
- Written by: Mariko Kunisawa
- Music by: Manual of Errors: Suguru Yamaguchi; Kimitaka Matsumae; Tarou Nagata
- Studio: J.C.Staff
- Original network: AT-X, Tokyo MX, KBS, Sun TV, TV Aichi, BS11, NBC
- Original run: July 9, 2014 – September 24, 2014
- Episodes: 12
- Original video animation

The Conclusion
- Directed by: Chikara Sakurai
- Produced by: Youhei Itou; Tooru Miyajima; Mihoko Shirado
- Written by: Seishi Minakami
- Music by: Manual of Errors: Suguru Yamaguchi; Kimitaka Matsumae; Tarou Nagata
- Studio: J.C.Staff
- Released: July 9, 2019
- Runtime: 30 minutes
- Episodes: 2

Magimoji Rurumo (まじもじるるも, Majimoji Rurumo) is a Japanese manga series by Wataru Watanabe, author of the manga series Yowamushi Pedal. The series follows Kōta Shibaki, a high school student, who trains with a witch named Rurumo through the use of magic tickets. However, whenever a ticket is used to make a wish, Shibaki's life will be shortened.

The first manga series was serialized in Kodansha's Monthly Shōnen Sirius magazine from October 2007 to 2011. A second and third manga have been serialized, from 2011 to 2013, and from 2013 to 2019, respectively. An anime television series adaptation produced by J.C.Staff aired from July to September 2014. Crunchyroll streamed the series.

== Plot ==
Shibaki is a high-school boy whose only interest is girls. Except he's been branded as the most perverted boy at school and girls avoid him like the plague. One day he finds a book in the library about how to summon witches. He tries it as a joke, but it turns out to be the real thing. An apprentice witch named Rurumo appears to grant him a wish. Shibaki helps Rurumo and she in return refuses to take his soul. When the story starts, Shibaki wishes he could see Rurumo again. His wishes is granted immediately as Rurumo falls from the sky and crash lands in front of him. He finds out that as punishment for not taking his soul she's been busted down to an apprentice witch. Now, she must complete the task of getting Shibaki to use up 666 magic tickets that grant wishes before she can become a witch again. However, what she does not know is that each time he uses a ticket it shortens his life. When the last ticket is used up, Shibaki will die. Shibaki knows this because Rurumo's familiar black cat Chiro tell him as part of the "contract" for giving him the tickets. Now, Shibaki has a choice, make a wish and help Rurumo become a witch again or resist the temptation and try to save his own life.

== Characters ==
Kōta Shibaki (柴木 耕太, Shibaki Kōta)
Voiced by: Makoto Takahashi
A high school student. Because of his various perverted actions in the past, which earned him the title "Pervert Shibaki" (ヘンタイシバキ, Hentai Shibaki), every girl alienates him, leading to an empty school life. He is part of his school's resident Mysterious Discovery (不思議発見クラブ, Fushigi Hakken Kurabu) Club, but he's not interested in the occult.

Rurumo (るるも)
Voiced by: Suzuko Mimori
A witch who made a contract with Shibaki. Her full name is Rurumo Magi Mojiruka (マジ＝モジルカ・ルルモ, Maji Mojiruka Rurumo). When Shibaki uses the tickets given to him, she can use magic to grant his wishes. On the outside, she looks like a normal middle school girl, and people usually assume she's a cosplayer, due to her clothes. She is expressionless and reticent to the extreme, but is by nature more shy than others, also being very clumsy and oblivious. After defying various rules, she was made to spend 60 years in prison.

Chiro (チロ)
Voiced by: Misato Fukuen
She's Rurumo's magical familiar, a purple-furred cat. Chiro is the one that informs Shibaki that once he uses up all 666 tickets that Rurumo gave him, he will die. She is able to transform into a human girl at will, in which form she becomes a tan-skinned teenage girl. She used to be a stray cat, who tried selling magic wands for a living, but Rurumo offered her to become her familiar, for which she's very thankful.

Shibaki's Mother (柴木の母, Shibaki no Haha)
Voiced by: Mamiko Noto
Shibaki's mother, whom he fears very much due to her violent tendencies, whereby she would, at times, threaten him with a knife, especially when she thinks he might be doing something illegal, such as abducting minors. It is hinted that she has a reverse form of Oedipus complex towards Shibaki.

Seitarō Shibaki (柴木 誠太郎, Shibaki Seitarō)
Voiced by: Yuka Takakura
Shibaki's little brother, who is deeply frightened by his mother's violent tendencies.

Senior (先輩, Senpai)
Voiced by: Junji Majima
The stern, straightforward president of the Mysterious Discovery Club, composed of himself, Shibaki, Mameo Fukusuke, and Hiro Tokoda. His real name is unknown. He expresses interest in Rurumo, and he often tries asking her to join the club. He is obsessed with the occult, often mistaking normal objects for UFOs. He frequently drags Shibaki, who he calls "Shibaraku" (しばらく), into his schemes.

Tanako Kujirai (鯨井 棚子, Kujirai Tanako)
Voiced by: Yurika Endō (anime), Minori Suzuki (OVA)
Rurumo's self-proclaimed rival. She joins the Mysterious Discovery Club, mainly due to having a crush on Senior. She claims to be a wizard, trying to impress Senior (who likewise ignores her advances), yet she fails to support her claim. She expresses very little interest in Shibaki, despite his attempts to impress her.

Mameo Fukusuke (福助 豆男, Fukusuke Mameo)
Voiced by: Kazutomi Yamamoto
A member of the Mysterious Discovery Club. A short and squat boy, who is frequently seen eating dumplings.

Hiro Tokoda (床田 広, Tokoda Hiro)
Voiced by: Shuta Morishima
Another member of the Mysterious Discovery Club. Tall and thin.

Sumiko Inoue (井上 澄子, Inoue Sumiko)
Voiced by: Shizuka Ishigami
The head of the school's "Disciplinary Committee," who has an uptight personality. She takes her duty of enforcing the school rules very seriously, together with Kyouko and Shimomura. She and Shibaki are childhood friends, as their families are old friends, and has been going to the same school as him since Kindergarten. It is hinted that despite her usual attitude, she wants to be victimized by Shibaki's perversion. She also seems to have a weakness for cute things.

Masako Shimomura (下村 雅子, Shimomura Masako)
Voiced by: Minami Takahashi
She is a member of the school's "Disciplinary Committee", where she serves as Inoue's secretary. She is an otaku who is into cosplay, which she keeps as a closely guarded secret. She befriends Rurumo, who she believes to be a cosplayer, and introduces her to the world of cosplaying and anime.

Kyōko Izumi (泉 強子, Izumi Kyōko)
Voiced by: Mari Shiraishi
She is a member of the school's "Disciplinary Committee," along with Inoue and Shimomura. She serves as an enforcer, physically punishing anyone found guilty of violating the school rules and public morals. She does not speak very often, and is much stronger than she appears to be. She appears to have a crush on Sakurai, who noted her to be a gentle person.

Maaya Sawashita (沢下 真綾, Sawashita Maaya)
Voiced by: Juri Nagatsuma
A popular student, and the main victim of Shibaki's perversion. Despite his lecherous behavior, Sawashita does not seem to antagonize him like the other girls do. She seems to be good friends with Tanako.
Hiroshi Nishino (西野 宏司, Nishino Hiroshi)
Voiced by: Hiro Shimono
A friend of Shibaki's, and also one of his "clients."

Hajime Suguwara (菅原 始, Sugawara Hajime)
Voiced by: Haruki Ishiya
Another of Shibaki's friends and "clients", who seems to like picking on Nishino. He often tries to impress Rurumo, but is usually ignored.

Tomoha Sakurai (桜井 知葉)
Voiced by: Yūsuke Kobayashi
Another of Shibaki's classmates and "clients," who is popular with the girls.
Harulily Walura (ワルラ ハルリリ, Warura Haruriri)
Voiced by: Natsumi Takamori
A stern high-tier witch. At first, she seems to be mean-spirited and abrasive, but is shown to have a softer side. She admires Rurumo, and is somewhat bothered by her unexpressiveness.

Ruri Iida (飯田 瑠璃, Iida Ruri)
Voiced by: Harumi Sakurai
A childish yet strict state enforcer. She provides directions for Rurumo in episode 5, but Rurumo is unable to remember her assistance. She often fends off Shibaki's attempts to approach schoolgirls, as well as Iida herself, although she likes playing with him.

== Media ==
=== Manga ===
The manga was serialized in Kodansha's shōnen manga magazine Monthly Shōnen Sirius from 2007 to 2011. The manga first appeared as a one-shot short story bonus for Watanabe's previous work Owarai Chibius (お笑いチビウス), included in Monthly Shōnen Sirius' July 2007 issue, and then became a regular serialization from October 2007 to February 2011, compiled into total of seven tankōbon volumes. The second manga, Magimoji Rurumo: Magic World Arc (まじもじるるも 魔界編 Majimoji Rurumo: Makai-hen) began serialization in April 2011 until March 2013, compiled into 5 volumes. The ongoing third manga, titled Magimoji Rurumo: After School Magic Junior High Student (まじもじるるも 放課後の魔法中学生 Majimoji Rurumo: Hōkago no Mahō Chugakusei) begun serialization in July 2013 and ended in June 2019, compiled into nine tankōbon volumes.

=== Anime ===
An anime adaptation, produced by J.C.Staff and directed by Chikara Sakurai, it aired from July 9 to September 24, 2014, on AT-X and later on Tokyo MX, KBS Kyoto, Sun TV, TV Aichi, BS11, and NBC. Kodansha was simulcasting the series on Crunchyroll with subtitles in English. The opening theme is "Seiippai, Tsutaetai!" (せいいっぱい、つたえたい!, I Want to Convey This to You With All My Might!) by Suzuko Mimori, who also voices Rurumo, and the ending theme is "Futari no Chronostasis" (ふたりのクロノスタシス, Our Chrono Stasis) by Yurika Endō. An OVA episode was bundled with the manga's 9th volume which was released on July 9, 2019.

No.	Title	Original release date
1	"I Will Grant You Your Wish" "Anata no Nozomi Kanaemasu" (あなたののぞみかなえます)	July 9, 2014
As a member of the Mysterious Discovery Club, one day Shibaki Kota summons a witch using a witch summoning manual he stumbled upon in the library. He jokingly asks for girls' panties. Rurumo is summoned, and delivers Shibaki what he'd wished for. However, he had no idea having his wish granted meant creating a contract with a witch and giving her his life. When Rurumo appears again, Shibaki receives 666 magic tickets from her that allow him to freely use magic. Making a human use up the magic tickets had been considered a form of training for Rurumo. However, Rurumo does not know the owner of the tickets dies once they are used up. When Shibaki learns this from Rurumo's cat familiar, Chiro, he swears never to use the tickets again.
2	"The Dream of Living Together" "Yume no Dōsei Seikatsu" (夢の同棲生活)	July 16, 2014
Rurumo cannot return to underworld and starts living in a tent like a homeless person. Shibaki and his club mates stumble upon her. Wanting to avoid her from getting found, Shibaki takes her to his home. He hides her in his room without his mom's knowledge and tries to keep them living there, even though his mother starts suspecting something. When Shibaki's mother suddenly barges into his room to find Shibaki and a sleeping Rurumo, Shibaki uses a ticket and Rurumo activates memory altering spell to make everyone think she is Shibaki's little sister and begins to live in his house.
3	"Magical Girl's Showdown" "Mahō Shōjo Taiketsu" (魔法少女対決)	July 23, 2014
Through the power of a memory alteration spell, Rurumo begins living with the Shibaki family under the guise of Shibaki's younger sister. Despite them living together, Shibaki experiences great distress at his inability to do anything to his "younger sister." Meanwhile, in order to punish herself for having too much leisure time, Rurumo begins working in the cafeteria at Shibaki's high school, where she makes mistake after mistake. Meanwhile, Tanako Kujirai joins the Mysterious Discovery Club, and takes the role as the club's resident "wizard."
4	"Inoue of the Disciplinary Committee" "Jajjimento no Inoue-san" (風紀委員の井上さん)	July 30, 2014
Strictly cracking down on students and beating offenders with their fists are the West High Student Council's student monitors. Student monitor Inoue Sumiko has known Shibaki since elementary school and cannot stand the sight of "Shibaki the Pervert." The student monitors conduct a school-wide "cleansing" of pornographic media that Shibaki had been leasing to his fellow students.
5	"My First Errand" "Hajimete no Otsukai" (はじめてのおつかい)	August 6, 2014
One summer Sunday, as Rurumo makes mistake after mistake while trying to clean the house, she is sent by Shibaki's mother to deliver a package he'd ordered to him, while he is working at his grandmother's farm. Rurumo and Chiro head to the post office to purchase "stamps" to ride the train, with Shibaki's friends and acquaintances from school spotting her on her journey.
6	"Incident on a Rainy Day" "Ame no Hi no Jiken" (雨の日のジケン)	August 13, 2014
Some underclassmen witness Shibaki picking up gravure magazines off the ground. Through his attempt to conceal his actions, he ends up taking three abandoned kittens, Man, Slaughter, and Case, home. However, his animal-hating mother discovers them, and he decides to keep them at school until he finds homes for them, using any means possible.
7	"The Legendary Swimsuit" "Densetsu no Mizugi" (伝説の水着)	August 20, 2014
Shibaki and his friends go to the beach at the suggestion of Senior. There they run into the student monitors, their busty classmate Maya, and policewoman Ruri Iida. No matter how much Shibaki recommends it, Rurumo refuses to change out of her witch outfit and into a swimsuit, and it becomes clear she forgot to buy one. Chiro then sets off to bring Rurumo the perfect swimsuit. Meanwhile, Senior drags Shibaki to search through the forest for what he has claimed to be the "legendary swimsuit."
8	"First Class Witch, Harulily, Appears" "Daiikkyū Majo Haruriri Kōrin" (第一級魔女ハルリリ降臨)	August 27, 2014
A witch called "Harulily Walura" comes to town, offering Shibaki a contract which, unlike Rurumo's, won't result in his death. After he tries out the tickets given to her, he realizes that they disappeared. Rurumo and Chiro then come after them after sensing Magic, and they recognize her. Harulily spends the day helping Rurumo out in different jobs, where Rurumo's clumsiness would always get them fired. Harulily confronts Rurumo about her unexpressiveness, reminiscing about the past, and asks her if she's really intent on finishing her training.
9	"A Secret That No One Can Know" "Darenimoienai Himitsu" (誰にも言えない秘密)	September 3, 2014
The serious student monitor Shimomura Masako loves anime and creates her own cosplay. When Masako brings her cosplay accessory to school, she drops it on the ground. Rurumo witnesses the event. Masako already feels a sense of affinity for Rurumo due to her mistaken belief that her witch's outfit is a form of cosplay, and is moved when Rurumo does not mock her hobby, inviting her to a cosplay event.
10	"Mixed Bathing Trip in Okamimura" "Kon'yoku ryokō in Ookamimura" (混浴旅行in尾々神村)	September 10, 2014
Surrounded by legends of the Japanese wolf since long ago, the town of Okamimura lies deep within the mountains. Members of the Mysterious Discovery Club along with Kōta, Rurumo, his classmates Nishino, Sugawara, Sakurai, Maya, and the student monitor trio take a train to Okamimura. Transforming herself into a human, Chiro tags along as Rurumo's younger sister. The Mysterious Discovery Club discovers a magic potion, which Senior gives Kōta for him to drink. The potion ends up transforming Kōta into a wolf, and he has to run for his life before he is hunted down by the inn's owners.
11	"Girls Band Formed" "Kessei Gāruzu Bando" (結成☆ガールズバンド)	September 17, 2014
In order to attract more members to the Mysterious Discovery Club, Tanako suggests them to try joining a famous televised band contest. After raiding the school for band members, they end up enlisting Maaya (Guitar), Sumiko (Bass), Kyōko (Drums), Tanako herself (Keyboard) and Rurumo as the Vocalist, and also Masako as a costume designer, who suggests them to use costumes similar to Rurumo's, since it matches the Mysterious Discovery Club's theme. They do well, in the auditions, but when Rurumo realizes she'll have to sing in front of many people, she is unable to go on. Kōta decides to sing in her place, only to realize he's tone deaf, giving the band a bad score. Later, Rurumo sings to Kōta alone.
12	"A Day Without Rurumo" "Rurumo no Inai Hi" (るるものいない日)	September 24, 2014
Kōta talks to Rurumo about the new year festival that is coming on, while she sees a Yukata in a vitrine, and finds it really pretty. Kōta, wanting to make her a surprise, starts working to save money to buy the Yukata for Rurumo to wear in the festival. When the festival comes, however, everyone seems to have forgotten about Rurumo's existence, as they remember what has happened over the year, but ignore her presence in these events. Kōta then starts remembering Rurumo, and then runs into her, who is wearing the Yukata he bought her. She explains that every year on a set day, which happens to be the same day as the festival, someone would come to the human world to check how a contracted witch was, and thus Rurumo's existence was temporarily erased from everyone's memory in order to avoid confusion. Rurumo then tries to look surprised, since Kōta was trying to surprise her.
