= Billy Kametz =

American voice actor (1987–2022)

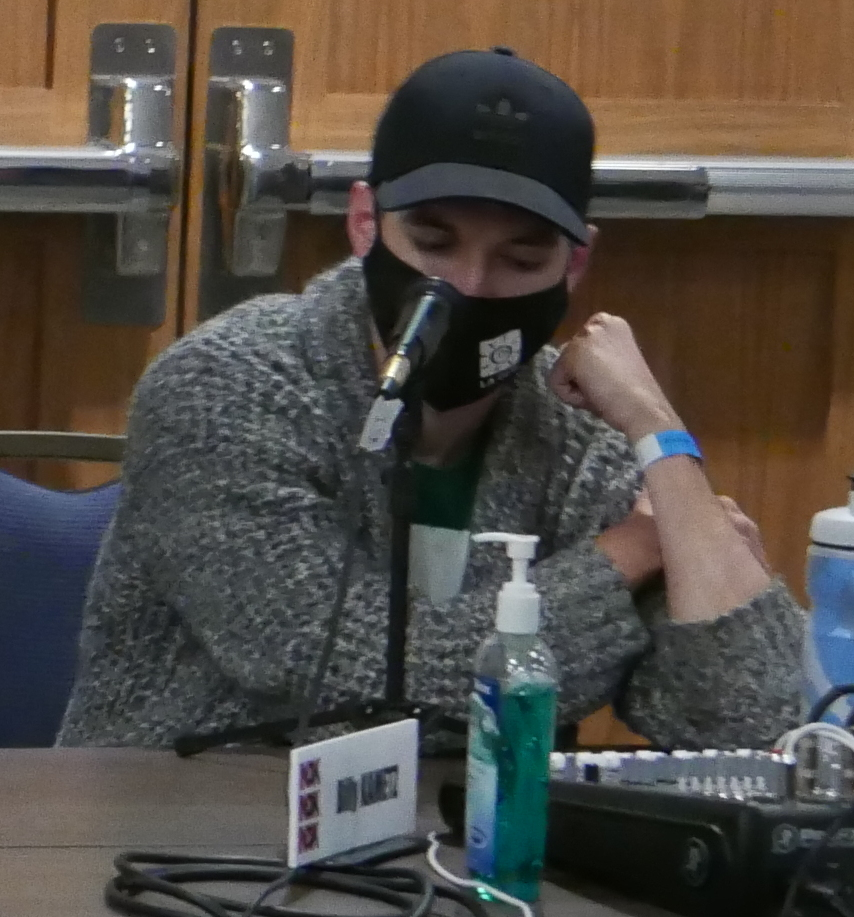
- Kametz in 2021
- Born: Billy P. Kametz; March 22, 1987; Lancaster, Pennsylvania, U.S.
- Died: June 9, 2022 (aged 35); Hershey, Pennsylvania, U.S.
- Education: West Chester University
- Occupation: Voice actor
- Years active: 2016–2022
- Agent: AVO Talent
- Notable work: Promare as Galo Thymos; JoJo's Bizarre Adventure: Diamond Is Unbreakable as Josuke Higashikata; Fire Emblem: Three Houses and Fire Emblem Warriors: Three Hopes as Ferdinand von Aegir; Persona 5 Royal as Takuto Maruki; Brawl Stars as Colt; The Rising of the Shield Hero as Naofumi Iwatani

Billy P. Kametz (/ˌkəˈmɛts/; March 22, 1987 – June 9, 2022) was an American voice and stage actor. He was best known for his work dubbing anime and video games. Kametz began his voice acting career in 2016. He provided the English voices for Josuke Higashikata in JoJo's Bizarre Adventure: Diamond Is Unbreakable, Takuto Maruki in Persona 5 Royal, Naofumi Iwatani in The Rising of the Shield Hero, Colt in Brawl Stars, and Ferdinand von Aegir in the Fire Emblem series. Kametz died from colorectal cancer at the age of 35.

== Early life ==
Kametz was born on March 22, 1987, in Lancaster, Pennsylvania, and was raised in Hershey, Pennsylvania. He had a sister. He attended West Chester University. Kametz started out acting by doing theatres in university for years.

== Career ==
In 2016, Kametz moved to Sherman Oaks in Los Angeles to play Aladdin in the final performance of Disney's Aladdin: A Musical Spectacular. While living in California, Kametz began working as a voice actor. He achieved one of his first major roles when he was cast as Josuke Higashikata in the Viz Media dub of JoJo's Bizarre Adventure: Diamond Is Unbreakable. He went on to voice other prominent roles, including Colt in Brawl Stars, Takuto Maruki in Persona 5 Royal, Galo Thymos in Promare, Ren in Pokémon, and Ferdinand von Aegir in Fire Emblem: Three Houses, among many other roles in animation and video games.

Kametz was able to posthumously reprise his role as Ferdinand in Fire Emblem Warriors: Three Hopes and Rui in Demon Slayer games "Sweep the Board!" and "The Hinokami Chronicles 2".

In 2020, for his performance as Naofumi Iwatani in The Rising of the Shield Hero, Kametz won the Best VA Performance (EN) award at the 4th Crunchyroll Anime Awards.

== Personal life ==
Kametz dated voice actress Erica Lindbeck.

== Cancer and death ==
On April 26, 2022, Kametz revealed that he had been diagnosed with colorectal cancer ten weeks prior, which had metastasized to his liver, lungs, and spine, and that he had begun chemotherapy and radiation therapy. He also announced that he would be taking a hiatus from voice acting and moving back to Hershey, Pennsylvania. A GoFundMe page was posted on May 1, 2022, to help cover travel, insurance costs, medical bills not covered by insurance, and everyday life necessities; these online fundraising efforts yielded more than US$184,000.

Five weeks after the fundraiser was launched, Kametz died on June 9, 2022, in Hershey, Pennsylvania at the age of 35. He was cremated.

== Filmography ==
=== Animation ===
List of voice performances in animation
Year	Title	Role	Notes	Source
2020	The Owl House	Nevareth	Episode: "Witches Before Wizards"	
2020–2023	Lego Monkie Kid	Macaque	Season 1–Season 4 episode 5, released posthumously; "New Adventures" dedicated in memory	
2023	RWBY	Roman Torchwick	2 episodes; released posthumously; "Tea Amidst Terrible Trouble" dedicated in memory	
2023	Hailey's On It!	Road Rash, Paul	2 episodes; released posthumously	

=== Anime ===
List of voice performances in anime
Year	Title	Role	Notes	Source
2018	Sword Gai	Seiya Ichijō		
2018	Fate/Extra Last Encore	Hakuno Kishinami		
2018	Sirius the Jaeger	Mikhail		
2018–19	JoJo's Bizarre Adventure: Diamond Is Unbreakable	Josuke Higashikata		
2018–19	Beyblade Burst Turbo	Fubuki Sumiye		
2018–22	Boruto: Naruto Next Generations	Metal Lee, Hidari, Tanuki Shigaraki, Hyōi Yorishiro, Kokushi		
2018–20	Baki	Kosho Shinogi, Gaia		
2019–20	KonoSuba	Kyouya Mitsurugi	Seasons 1 and 2 only	
2019	High School Prodigies Have It Easy Even in Another World	Elch		
2019	Hunter × Hunter: The Last Mission	Jed		
2019	Re:Zero − Starting Life in Another World	Wilhelm van Astrea (young)		
2019	The Rising of the Shield Hero	Naofumi Iwatani	Season 1 only	
2019	Promare	Galo Thymos		
2019	Neon Genesis Evangelion	Shigeru Aoba	Netflix dub	
2019	Neon Genesis Evangelion: Death & Rebirth	Shigeru Aoba	Netflix dub	
2019	The End of Evangelion	Shigeru Aoba	Netflix dub	
2019	To the Abandoned Sacred Beasts	Claude Withers		
2019	Teasing Master Takagi-san	Nishikata	Season 2	
2019	The Disastrous Life of Saiki K.	Kineshi Hairo	Reawakened	
2019–21	Aggretsuko	Anai		
2019–21	Cells at Work!	White Blood Cell (Neutrophil)		
2019–21	Welcome to Demon School! Iruma-kun	Asmodeus Alice	Seasons 1 and 2 only	
2020	Demon Slayer: Kimetsu no Yaiba	Rui		
2020	Science Fell in Love, So I Tried to Prove It	Shinya Yukimura	Season 1 only	
2020	Gundam Build Divers Re:Rise	Hiroto Kuga		
2020	Tower of God	Katan, Alexay Amigocharz		
2020	Dorohedoro	Tenjin, Risu		
2020–21	Beastars	Durham, Mayor		
2020–22	Pokémon	Ren, Inteleon, Ash's Rotom Phone		
2021	Fire Force	Amon Hajike		
2021	Suppose a Kid from the Last Dungeon Boonies Moved to a Starter Town	Allan Twein Lidcain		
2021	Osomatsu-san	Osomatsu		
2021	The Way of the Househusband	Kunimi		
2021	Number24	Syouta U		
2021	Vivy: Fluorite Eye's Song	Tatsuya Saeki		
2021	Resident Evil: Infinite Darkness	Patrick		
2021	The Prince of Tennis II: Hyotei vs. Rikkai Game of Future	Ryo Shishido		
2021	Vinland Saga	Ari	Netflix dub	
2021	Magatsu Wahrheit Zuerst	Conrad Wisdom		
2021	Battle Game in 5 Seconds	Madoka Kirisaki		
2021	Ikebukuro West Gate Park	Kyōichi Ozaki		
2021	Pokémon the Movie: Secrets of the Jungle	Dr. Zed		
2021	Otherside Picnic	Greg		
2021	Edens Zero	Master Noah Glenfield, Murray Morrison		
2021–22	Attack on Titan	Niccolo		
2021–22	86	Shinei Nouzen	Episodes 1–21 only	
2021–22	Re-Main	Takekazu Ejiri		
2022	Tokyo 24th Ward	Shuta Aoi	6 episodes	
2022	The Prince of Tennis	Ryo Shishido		

=== Video games ===
List of voice performances in video games
Year	Title	Role	Notes	Source
2016	Marvel Avengers Academy	Agent Coulson, Iron Lad, Collector, Thor Noir		
2018	BlazBlue: Cross Tag Battle	Naoto Kurogane		
2018	Brawl Stars	Colt		
2019	JumpStart Academy	Max Martian		
2019	AFK Arena	Angelo		
2019	Fire Emblem: Three Houses	Ferdinand von Aegir		
2019	Pokémon Masters	Blue	2019–2021	
2019	Mario & Sonic at the Olympic Games Tokyo 2020	Male Announcer		
2020	One-Punch Man: A Hero Nobody Knows	Additional voices		
2020	Fire Emblem Heroes	Ferdinand von Aegir		
2020	Persona 5 Royal	Takuto Maruki		
2020	13 Sentinels: Aegis Rim	Nenji Ogata		
2021	Ys IX: Monstrum Nox	Marius		
2021	Shin Megami Tensei III: Nocturne HD Remaster	Raidou Kuzunoha		
2021	Earth Defense Force: World Brothers	Lightning Alpha, Air Strike Unit		
2021	Demon Slayer: Kimetsu no Yaiba – The Hinokami Chronicles	Rui		
2021	Epic Seven	Ran		
2022	Triangle Strategy	Jerrom Laesmi		
2022	Relayer	Director of Defense Isaac, additional voices		
2022	The Elder Scrolls Online	Additional voices		
2022	AI: The Somnium Files – Nirvana Initiative	Tearer	Posthumous release	
2022	Fire Emblem Warriors: Three Hopes	Ferdinand von Aegir	Posthumous release	
2024	Demon Slayer: Kimetsu no Yaiba – Sweep the Board	Rui	Archive audio	
2025	Demon Slayer: Kimetsu no Yaiba – The Hinokami Chronicles 2	Rui	Archive audio	

== Awards and nominations ==
Award	Year	Category	Nominated work	Result	Ref.
Crunchyroll Anime Awards	2020	Best VA Performance (EN)	The Rising of the Shield Hero	Won	
