= Naofumi Iwatani =

Fictional character from The Rising of the Shield Hero

- The Rising of the Shield Hero character
- Naofumi Iwatani, as illustrated by Seira Minami
- First appearance: The Rising of the Shield Hero chapter 1: "A Royal Summons" (2013)
- Created by: Aneko Yusagi
- Voiced by: Japanese; Kaito Ishikawa; English; Billy Kametz (season 1); Stephen Fu (season 2–present)

Naofumi Iwatani (Japanese: 岩谷 尚文, Hepburn: Iwatani Naofumi) is a fictional character from the light novel The Rising of the Shield Hero written by Aneko Yusagi and illustrated by Seria Minami. Naofumi is a young man summoned into a parallel world along with three other young men to become the world's Cardinal Heroes and fight inter-dimensional hordes of monsters called Waves. Equipped with the Legendary Shield, the character earns the title of "Shield Hero" (盾の勇者, Tate no Yuusha) and goes on a journey with hatred towards society after being falsely accused of sexually assaulting a princess.

Naofumi was written by Aneko Yusagi to be a character affected by morality and how he forges bonds with other characters to recover himself from the presented crime. The anime staff aimed to portray him carefully when dealing with the character's relationships, most notably Raphtalia. He is voiced by Kaito Ishikawa in Japanese. In the English dub, he was voiced by Billy Kametz (season 1) and Steve Fu (season 2–present).

While reception of the character has been mixed based on his dark traits, multiple critics enjoyed his character arc presented in the story, most notably when dealing with his slave Raphtalia as the two grow close despite Naofumi's initial characterization. Kametz's voice acting earned him an award from Crunchyroll.

== Creation and development ==
Naofumi was created by Aneko Yusagi. Yusagi stressed the importance of leading with one's morality and the idea of negative effects or impacts on other people in the making of the character as Naofumi is accused of sex abuse. Naofumi was written to come across as a composed otaku, but Yusagi believes he is stronger in the anime to the point he believes that Naofumi is seen from Raphtalia's point of view. Throughout the first chapters Naofumi is comforted by Raphtalia, which Yusagi felt was one of the best adapted parts of the anime. Another important relationship Naofumi forges in the narrative is with L'arc Berg, who is made to act like his older brother despite often irritating him.

Anime director Takao Abo aimed to portray him as the weakest of the summoned heroes due to his relative lack of aid when fighting. Screenwriter Keigo Koyanagi described these hardships as common in the isekai genre but described Naofumi as a different type of protagonist, aiming to make him come across as unique. Producer Junichiro Tamura elaborated on these difficulties and specified that ones Naofumi has to face involve unspecified dark areas as a more realistic hero. The anime staff elaborated on the difficulties of dealing with adapting the parts of the light novel when Naofumi buys Raphtalia as a slave, reminding the audience that since the character is aware he is hated by society, having a slave would not affect his popularity. Abo considers Naofumi's growthing relationship with Raphtalia and the rest of his allies as the concept of a family-like story he wanted to make.

In regards to his fighting abilities, Naofumi was found interesting by the anime staff for how his only weapon is a shield and thus he has to rely on tactics as well as Raphtalia to fight. In order to make combat more appealing, the shield was animated to have multiple forms. The staff found it challenging to properly adapt the light novel's details about Naofumi's weapon.

In the anime version, Naofumi is voiced by Kaito Ishikawa who expressed shock at how Myne falsely accused him of having assaulted her. Nevertheless, Ishikawa tried to give the character a more positive tone in order to contrast his poor state, and especially when the protagonist trains to become a stronger fighter. As a result of his brooding personality, Ishikawa tries having a mind in regards to Naofumi to portray him properly. Furthermore, when exploring Naofumi taking care of Raphtalia, the actor realized his character displayed a more charming personality. Nevertheless, he states that while he often does nice actions, he is unwilling to be open to himself and still pretends to act coldly. In the English dub of the series, Naofumi is voiced by Billy Kametz for the first season. After Kametz announced that he was taking a leave of absence from voice acting after being diagnosed with stage IV colon cancer, which ultimately led to his death on June 9, 2022, Stephen Fu replaced him for the ongoing seasons.

== Appearances ==
Naofumi is a university student who was summoned from another world after finding a book about the Four Heroes. Originally an open minded person, he becomes cynical and distrustful of others due to being looked down by his fellow heroes, subjected to religious prejudice from citizens, and being robbed and falsely accused of attempted rape by Malty. It is only after Raphtalia defended him and proclaimed her loyalty that Naofumi began to slowly open up to those around him and realizing his mistakes. Viewing his role as a Hero burdensome, having been summoned against his will, Naofumi shows little remorse in using underhanded tactics to ensure the survival of his party despite the criticism of his fellow heroes. Generally reluctant to trust strangers, often asking to be paid upfront or using slave curses to prevent lying, he tries his best to live up to the expectations of those who have placed their faith in him or treat him as an equal.

After defeating Kyo and ending the threat of the Spirit Tortoise (the Cal Mira Wave in the anime), Naofumi is given control of Raphtalia's hometown. He soon plans to rebuild and make a makeshift army to fight against the Waves and remaining Guardian Beasts, purchasing the original displaced inhabitants and other slaves to repopulate. He often enjoys pretending to be the villain, much to Raphtalia's annoyance and the reluctance of his allies, and working as a merchant/craftsman in his spare time. Believing he'll one day return home, he considers himself a foster parent to Raphtalia and Filo and desires to make sure they can protect themselves in his absence.

Although Naofumi has a slow start because of the public's perception of him and being unable to attack enemies directly, he is still able to keep up with his fellow heroes and even outshine them due to unlocking a wide variety of shields that boost his allies and passive skills. Given his high defenses, he is able to shrug off most attacks and displays immunity to most poisons, being only vulnerable to attacks that use his stats against him such as Hengen Muso. His strongest shield: the cursed Shield of Wrath, allows him to counterattack opponents with black flames that rise with his anger at the cost of temporarily decreasing his stats and threatening to allow his inner darkness to take control. While the Legendary Shield is temporarily disabled in Kizuna's world, he is chosen as the new Vassel Mirror Hero.

Outside The Rising of the Shield Hero, Naofumi, Raphtalia and Filo appeared as guest characters in the comical spin-off Isekai Quartet.

== Reception ==
Critical reception to Naofumi's character has been mixed-to-positive. In a review of the first light novel, Anime News Network found Naofumi's hatred towards society for accusing him of a crime as too much to follow him, based on some actions, most notably buying Raphtalia as a slave. Nevertheless, the dynamic these two characters is well written as it helps to shows the gentle side of his personality rather than the initial cruel traits. As a result, she found Naofumi as a more unusual hero than the ones seen more commonly in other works. Similarly, Theron Martin stated that "the series seems like it's angling to build Naofumi up more as a folk hero than the famously brazen heroes we're used to seeing in fantasy stories" and that "episode 3 gives the best argument to date for the series' possible potential." Anime UK News found that while the initial parts of the series' narrative might be hard difficult too in the anime form due to Naofumi's actions, the way the relationship evolves makes the duo more likable protagonists. The Fandom Post praised the setup provided by Naofumi as how twisted the premise becomes when Naofumi is accused of committing a crime and becomes a darker character to gain more power. In a following review, ANN praised the author's handling of Naofumi's quirks as "His cynicism helps to drive the plot forward, and more importantly, it shows that he thinks about his actions and their consequences more than the other Heroes do". Anime UK Network compared Naofumi's dilemma with Mystara's Penhaligon Trilogy of books by D.J Heinrich and said that while Naofumi initially treats Raphtalia poorly, he grows to care for her, resulting in one of the best scenes from the light novel; Raphtalia comforts a depressed Naofumi who states he has abused her but Raphtalia has grown to care about him too. As a result, Locksley refers to Naofumi as person seeking redemption as he grows into a more caring person despite his negative emotions displayed in the early chapters.

Some critics focused more on the character's portrayal in the anime form. Manga.Tokyo praised Naofumi's character arc in the anime due to how decides to stay to protect his friends rather than returning to his own world as he thanks Raphtalia for his constant aid, something which made the reviewer look forward to them in form of a romantic relationship in a future season. Anime UK News felt that Naofumi comes across as a more believable character in the anime than in the light novel referring to the latter as possibly bitter hero as a message from the author to explain a darker story he could not properly tell. Anime UK News felt Naofumi was given more scenes in the anime to be more likeable than in the light novel. Nevertheless, he criticized an early scene where Naofumi judges a princess. The Fandom Post also felt that Naofumi became a more engaging character across the anime series as well as more powerful than the other heroes despite his initial weakness.

Some critics were far more negative in regards to the character. Timothy Donohoo of Comic Book Resources heavily criticized how Naofumi comes across as an "overpowered protagonist who's seemingly never wrong" and for the "socially contentious undertones", noting that "the series has gotten its fair share of well deserved flak". He speculates that some viewers may sympathize with the protagonist, noting that this would "justify the show's label as an 'incel fantasy'". In retrospective, Anime News Network referred to Naofumi's and Raphtalia's relationship as the worst one in anime, claiming that despite Naofumi wanted to free her from being a slave, Raphtalia decided to keep this bond with her master.

In the Anime Awards 2020 from Crunchyroll, Billy Kametz won the category "Best Voice Actor (En)" for voicing Naofumi. Kametz expressed joy over this award and thanked the remaining members from the series' cast for aiding him.

FandomSpot author R. Romero ranked him as the 10th best Isekai protagonist in anime as, despite criticizing his disdain towards women, he becomes likable in the story thanks to his character arc.
