= Kinema Citrus =

Japanese animation studio

Kinema Citrus Co., Ltd.
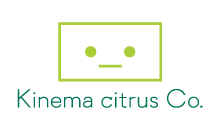

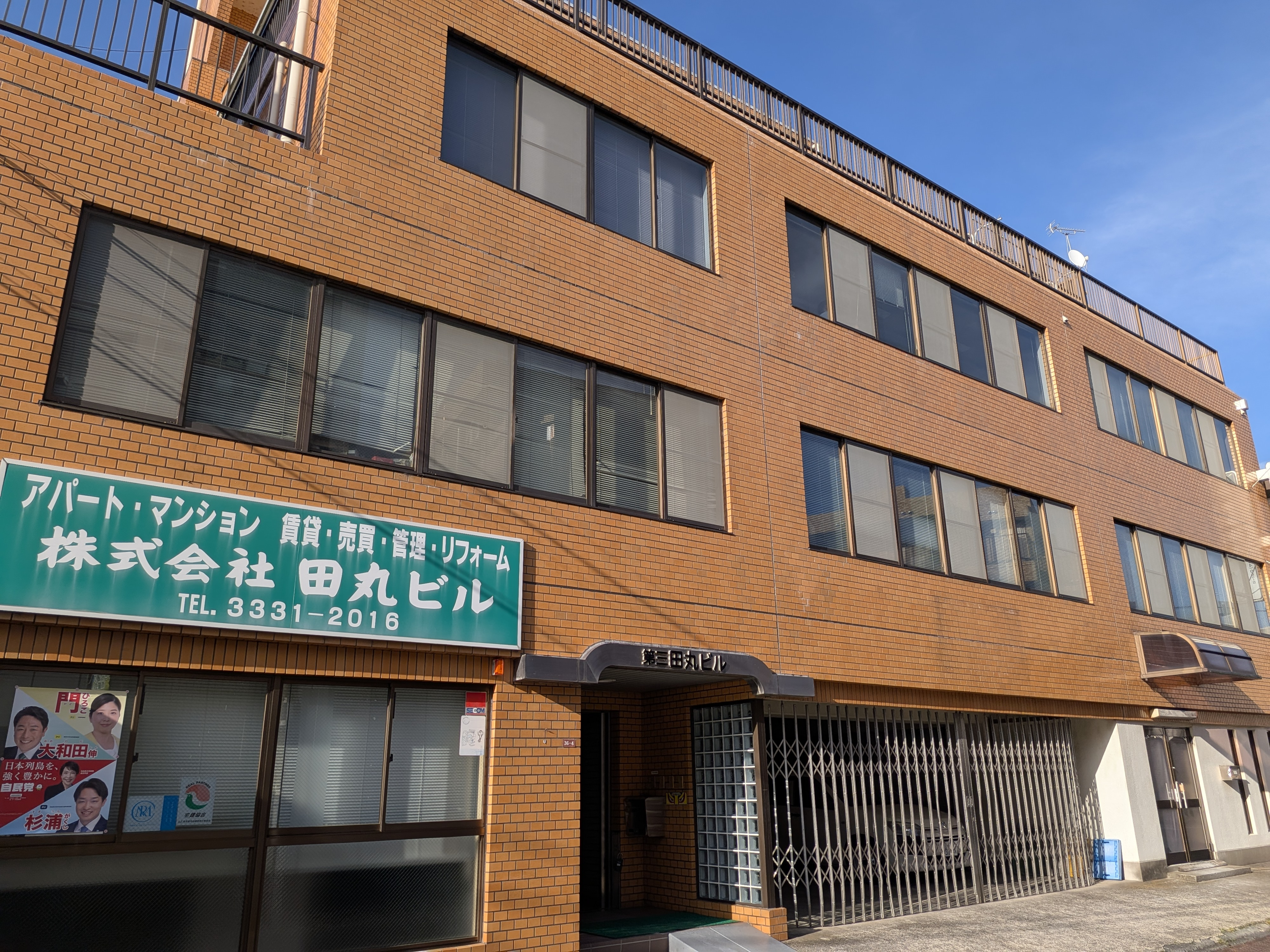
- Headquarters in Suginami, Tokyo
- Native name: 株式会社キネマシトラス
- Romanized name: Kabushiki-gaisha Kinema Shitorasu
- Type: Kabushiki gaisha
- Industry: Japanese animation
- Founded: March 3, 2008; 18 years ago
- Founders: Muneki Ogasawara; Yuichiro Matsuka; Masaki Tachibana
- Headquarters: Ogikubo, Suginami, Tokyo, Japan
- Key people: Muneki Ogasawara (Chairman); Koji Sone (President)
- Owner: Muneki Ogasawara (36.4%); Kadokawa (31.8%); Bushiroad (31.8%)
- Number of employees: 92 (as of 2026)
- Subsidiaries: Gift-o'-Animation (Note: Gift-o'-Animation (ぎふとアニメーション), an animation subsidiary studio located in Gifu founded in 2015.)
- Website: kinemacitrus.biz

Kinema Citrus Co., Ltd. (Japanese: 株式会社キネマシトラス, Hepburn: Kabushiki-gaisha Kinema Shitorasu) is a Japanese animation studio, founded on March 3, 2008, by former Production I.G and Bones members and based in Suginami, Tokyo. Its business directors are Muneki Ogasawara, Yuichiro Matsuka and Masaki Tachibana. Notable works include Tokyo Magnitude 8.0 in 2009, co-produced with Bones, .hack//Quantum, a 3-episode OVA series, Black Bullet and Barakamon in 2014, Made in Abyss in 2017, and The Rising of the Shield Hero in 2019.

== History ==
On December 12, 2019, Kinema Citrus announced that Kadokawa and Bushiroad acquired each of them a total of 31.8% on the company. The three companies previously announced a partnership in the same year for the creation of different anime, and one of the reasons for the deal was due to that partnership.

== Works ==
=== Television series ===
Title	Director(s)	First run start date	First run end date	Eps	Note(s)
Higepiyo	Atsushi Takeyama	April 3, 2009	February 26, 2010	39	Adaptation of the four-panel gag manga series written by Risa Itō.
Tokyo Magnitude 8.0	Masaki Tachibana	July 9, 2009	September 17, 2009	11	Original work. Co-animated with Bones.
Oshiri Kajiri Mushi	Masayuki Kojima (season 1–2); Pon Kozutsumi (season 1); Kaori (season 2); Masatsugu Arakawa (season 3)	October 7, 2012	December 7, 2015	72	A children's anime series based on a children's song in Japan.
Code:Breaker	Yasuhiro Irie	October 7, 2012	December 30, 2012	13	Adaptation of the manga series written by Akimine Kamijyo.
Yuyushiki	Kaori	April 9, 2013	June 26, 2013	12	Adaptation of the 4-panel manga series written by Komata Mikami.
Black Bullet	Masayuki Kojima	April 8, 2014	July 1, 2014	13	Adaptation of the light novel series written by Shiden Kanzaki. Co-animated with Orange.
Barakamon	Masaki Tachibana	July 6, 2014	September 27, 2014	12	Adaptation of the manga series written by Satsuki Yoshino.
Is the Order a Rabbit??	Hiroyuki Hashimoto	October 10, 2015	December 26, 2015	12	Sequel to Is the Order a Rabbit? Co-animated with White Fox.
Norn9	Takao Abo	January 7, 2016	March 31, 2016	12	Based on an otome game by Otomate. Co-animated with Orange.
Kuma Miko: Girl Meets Bear	Kiyoshi Matsuda	April 3, 2016	June 19, 2016	12	Adaptation of the manga series written by Masume Yoshimoto. Co-animated with EMT Squared.
Scorching Ping Pong Girls	Yasuhiro Irie	October 3, 2016	December 19, 2016	12	Adaptation of the manga series written by Yagura Asano.
Made in Abyss	Masayuki Kojima	July 7, 2017	September 29, 2017	13	Adaptation of the manga series written by Akihito Tsukushi.
Revue Starlight	Tomohiro Furukawa	July 12, 2018	September 27, 2018	12	Based on a Japanese media franchise created by Bushiroad and Nelke Planning.
The Rising of the Shield Hero	Takao Abo	January 9, 2019	June 26, 2019	25	Adaptation of the light novel series written by Aneko Yusagi.
Show by Rock!! Mashumairesh!!	Seung Hui Son	January 9, 2020	March 26, 2020	12	Sequel to Show by Rock!!
Show by Rock!! Stars!!	Takahiro Ikezoe (chief); Daigo Yamagishi	January 7, 2021	March 25, 2021	12	Sequel to Show by Rock!! Mashumairesh!!.
Cardfight!! Vanguard overDress	Ken Mori	April 3, 2021	December 28, 2021	25	New anime series for Cardfight!! Vanguard. Co-animated with Gift-o'-Animation and Studio Jemi.
The Rising of the Shield Hero (season 2)	Masato Jinbo	April 6, 2022	June 29, 2022	13	Sequel to The Rising of the Shield Hero. Co-animated with DR Movie.
Cardfight!! Vanguard will+Dress	Ken Mori (chief); Ryūtarō Suzuki	July 5, 2022	September 29, 2023	38	Sequel to Cardfight!! Vanguard overDress. Co-animated with Gift-o'-Animation and Studio Jemi.
Made in Abyss: The Golden City of the Scorching Sun	Masayuki Kojima	July 6, 2022	September 28, 2022	12	Sequel to Made in Abyss: Dawn of the Deep Soul.
My Happy Marriage	Takehiro Kubota	July 5, 2023	September 20, 2023	12	Adaptation of the light novel series written by Akumi Agitogi.
The Rising of the Shield Hero (season 3)	Hitoshi Haga	October 6, 2023	December 22, 2023	12	Sequel to The Rising of the Shield Hero season 2.
Cardfight!! Vanguard DivineZ	Taku Yamada	January 12, 2024	TBA	TBA	Sequel to Cardfight!! Vanguard will+Dress.
My Happy Marriage (season 2)	Takehiro Kubota; Masayuki Kojima	January 6, 2025	April 9, 2025	13	Sequel to My Happy Marriage.
The Rising of the Shield Hero (season 4)	Hitoshi Haga	July 9, 2025	September 24, 2025	12	Sequel to The Rising of the Shield Hero season 3.
Goodbye, Lara	Takushi Koide	July 6, 2026	September 20, 2026	12	Original work.
My Happy Marriage (special)	Takehiro Kubota	October 25, 2026		3	Sequel to My Happy Marriage season 2.
The Rising of the Shield Hero (season 5)	Hitoshi Haga	2027	TBA	TBA	Sequel to The Rising of the Shield Hero season 4.

=== Films ===
Title	Director(s)	Release date	Notes
Eureka Seven: Pocket Full of Rainbows	Tomoki Kyoda; Hiroshi Haraguchi	April 25, 2009	A theatrical adaptation of Eureka Seven. Co-animated with Bones.
Neppu Kairiku Bushi Road	Masayuki Sakoi	December 31, 2013	Based on a Japanese media franchise created by Bushiroad, Bandai Visual, and Nitroplus. Co-animated with Orange.
Made in Abyss: Journey's Dawn	Masayuki Kojima	January 4, 2019	A summary of the first half of Made in Abyss.
Made in Abyss: Wandering Twilight	Masayuki Kojima	January 18, 2019	A summary of the second half of Made in Abyss.
Made in Abyss: Dawn of the Deep Soul	Masayuki Kojima	January 17, 2020	Sequel to Made in Abyss.
Revue Starlight Rondo Rondo Rondo	Tomohiro Furukawa	August 7, 2020	A summary of Revue Starlight.
Revue Starlight the Movie	Tomohiro Furukawa	June 4, 2021	Sequel to Revue Starlight.
Made in Abyss: Awakening Mystery	Masayuki Kojima	October 23, 2026	Sequel to Made in Abyss: The Golden City of the Scorching Sun.

=== Original video animations ===
Title	Director	Release date	Eps	Notes
.hack//Quantum	Masaki Tachibana	December 27, 2010– March 25, 2011	3	Original OVA series presented by Bandai Visual.
The Legend of Heroes: Trails in the Sky The Animation	Masaki Tachibana	November 25, 2011– February 24, 2012	2	Based on a role-playing video game by Nihon Falcom.
Marimo no Hana	Akitoshi Yokoyama	March 18, 2012	1	
Nagareboshi Lens	N/A	March 18, 2012	1	Based on a shōjo manga series written by Mayu Murata.
Under the Dog	Masahiro Andō	August 1, 2016	1	A Kickstarter-funded anime project. Co-animated with Orange.
Yuyushiki	Kaori	February 22, 2017	1	

=== Original net animation ===
Title	Director	First run start date	First run end date	Eps	Note(s)
Busou Shinki: Moon Angel	Masayuki Kojima	September 7, 2011	January 26, 2012	10	Animation created to coincide with release of the second PSP video game, 'Busou Shinki Battle Masters Mk. 2. Co-animated with TNK.
Star Wars: Visions - The Village Bride	Hitoshi Haga	September 22, 2021		3	Short film; part of the Star Wars: Visions anthology.
Star Wars: Visions - Yuko's Treasure	Masaki Tachibana	October 29, 2025		3	Short film; part of the Star Wars: Visions anthology
Star Wars: Visions - The Lost Ones	Hitoshi Haga	October 29, 2025		3	Short film; part of the Star Wars: Visions anthology
