= Makoto Takahashi (voice actor) =

Japanese voice actor

- 高橋 信
- Born: January 16; Kanagawa, Japan
- Occupation: Voice actor
- Years active: 2012-present

Makoto Takahashi (高橋 信, Takahashi Makoto; born January 16) is a male Japanese voice actor from Kanagawa prefecture. He is affiliated with Atomic Monkey. He is a Tokyo Animation University graduate.

== Filmography ==
=== Anime ===
2012

- Shin Sekai Yori as Bakenezumi
- Sword Art Online as Sylph Corps (ep 23)

2014

- Lord Marksman and Vanadis as Knight (ep 7); Chamberlain (ep 8); Soldier (eps 11-12)
- Magimoji Rurumo as Kōta Shibaki
- Wolf Girl and Black Prince as Male Friend (ep 7); Class 2 Boy (ep 9)

2015

- The Disappearance of Nagato Yuki-chan as Tennis club member A (ep 5)
- The Seven Deadly Sins as Holy Knight C (ep 23)
- Triage X as Yasuomi Hachisuka

2016

- Haven't You Heard? I'm Sakamoto as Schoolboy (ep 8)
- Kiss Him, Not Me as Student
- OZMAFIA!! as Judie

2017

- Anonymous Noise as Male Student

2019

- The Rising of the Shield Hero as Kitamura Motoyasu
- Afterlost as Kōta
- Kochoki: Wakaki Nobunaga as Sassa Narimasa

2022

- The Rising of the Shield Hero 2 as Kitamura Motoyasu

=== Video games ===
2013

- Ken ga Kimi as Shiguragi
- OZMAFIA!! as Judie

2014

- Sword Art Online: Hollow Fragment
- Shoumetsu Toshi as Kouta

2016

- Ichichimanji Jie Online as Benkei

2021

- Guilty Gear Strive as Happy Chaos

=== TV commercials ===
Bandai Namco Games (Reading Company title)

=== Voice drama ===
- Mairunovich (Vomic) as Ikeda
- Kono Oto Tomare! Sounds of Life (Vomic)

=== Stage ===
- Makai Tensei as Servant 2-Dan

=== Dubbing ===
- West Side Story as Quique (Julius Rubio)
