= List of A Certain Magical Index characters =

The main characters of A Certain Magical Index (from top to bottom): Tōma Kamijō, Index (top); Accelerator, Mikoto Misaka, and Shiage Hamazura (bottom) with Academy City (background)

The following is a list of characters from A Certain Magical Index light novel, manga and anime series, and its side-story manga and anime series titled A Certain Scientific Railgun and A Certain Scientific Accelerator, as well as a number of spin-off media. The series primarily takes place in Academy City, a city filled with students who strove to become powerful espers and were brought into conflict by the appearance of sorcerers.

== Central characters ==
=== Toma Kamijo ===
Voiced by: Atsushi Abe (Japanese); Micah Solusod (English)

Toma Kamijo (上条 当麻, Kamijō Tōma) is a first-year high school student and a Level 0 esper, yet has an ability called "Imagine Breaker" (幻想殺し(イマジンブレイカー), Imajin Bureikā; lit. "Illusion Killer") in which he uses his right hand to negate abilities whether they are magic or scientific. Upon meeting Index, Toma becomes involved in major events that take place in A Certain Magical Index franchise. With his frequent encounters with Mikoto Misaka, Toma has also been involved in major events in A Certain Scientific Railgun franchise.

=== Mikoto Misaka ===
Voiced by: Rina Satō (Japanese); Brittney Karbowski (English)

Mikoto Misaka (御坂 美琴) is one of the main heroines from the science side in A Certain Magical Index, as well as the main protagonist and the titular character of A Certain Scientific Railgun. She is Academy City's third most powerful Level 5 esper with an ability called "Railgun" (超電磁砲(レールガン), Rērugan; lit. "Super Electromagnetic Cannon") which allows her to produce one billion volts of electricity, making her the most powerful Electromaster in Academy City.

=== Index ===
Voiced by: Yuka Iguchi (Japanese); Monica Rial (English)

Index Librorum Prohibitorum (禁書目録(インデックス), Indekkusu), also known as Index, is a fifteen-year-old English nun from Church of England's Necessarius, with Dedicatus545 ("The devoted lamb protects the knowledge of the strong") as her magic name. She is always seen wearing the Walking Church, a white robe with a golden embroidery sewn on every edge of it (later with golden pins after it is destroyed by Toma Kamijo with his Imagine Breaker). Index's mind has been implanted with 103,000 grimoires of the Index Librorum Prohibitorum since she possesses photographic memory and is the only magician who can read grimoires that are deadly to a normal magician or individual. She has a self-protection system personality called "John's Pen" (自動書記(ヨハネのペン), Yohane no Pen; lit. "Automatic Writing") which allows her to cast high-class magic attacks such as St. George's Sanctuary (聖(セント)ジョージの聖域, Seinto Jōji no Seīki) and Dragon's Breath (竜王の殺息(ドラゴンブレス), Doragon Buresu; lit. "Dragon King's Killing Breath"). Her self-protection system has a by-product called "Feather of Light" (光の羽, Hikari no Hane) which forces a reset on her memory in case a manual reset fails to be performed. Although she does not know that she has magic abilities, Index can easily identify the types of magic by seeing it or somebody describing it to her and know how to counter them. Her vast knowledge of the Index Librorum Prohibitorum within her mind makes her one of the most powerful characters so far and becomes helpful to her friends in various situations like using Spell Intercept (強制詠唱 (スペルインターセプト), Superu Intāseputo; lit. "Force Chant") and Sheol Fear (魔滅の声(シェオールフィア), Sheōru Fia; lit. "Voice of Destruction of Evil") in the fight against the battle nuns of the Roman Catholic Church led by Agnese Sanctis.

Index is often elated by a variety of things and is slightly ignorant and curious about modern technology. She usually is gentle and polite with people and has a kind nature, but is also a selfish spoiled brat when together with Toma. She is also abusive towards him and hypocritical, chiding him for doing things she doesn't like, yet does the same things herself. She constantly jumps to conclusions without learning the circumstances first and constantly punishes Toma, wrongfully, by biting him or starting arguments with him, much to his confusion and exasperation. Index also has a large appetite and likes watching an anime series titled Magical Powered Kanamin. She has strong feelings toward Toma and even confessed her love after hearing Toma lost his memories because of her. However, he avoided answering by changing the theme of the talk since he has no idea about what kind of feelings he used to have with Index.

When she returns to England, Index is sought out by Fiamma of the Right, who wants her knowledge, and is reactivated in her John's Pen mode by her remote control magical item. Later during her stay at Necessarius' headquarters in St. George Cathedral, Index learns the bitter truth about Toma when Fiamma reveals him lying to her about his memories, which sends her on a rampage and grows an angelic Crimson Wings that corners Stiyl Magnus, who tries to restrain her, with ease just by flapping her wings. She also has displayed the ability to summon legendary weapons and artifacts to attack, such as the Sword of Freyr, the magic sword of the Norse god of the same name. After defeating Fiamma, Toma releases Index's mind from his control, apologizes to her, and both promise each other to meet again. At the end of the twenty-second volume of A Certain Magical Index, Index returns to St. George Cathedral with Stiyl to learn Toma's condition. In A Certain Magical Index: New Testament, Index eventually reunites with Toma when he returns to Academy City after the events of World War III. She later joins Toma, Accelerator, Shiage Hamazura, Rikō Takitsubo, and Aleister Crowley during the latter's invasion of London, where she learns another grimoire for a total of 103,001. She also engages in a fight with Mikoto Misaka during a conflict between Toma and his doppelganger in Windsor Castle. In A Certain Magical Index: Genesis Testament, Index returns to Academy City with Toma in time for a Christmas holiday but is later sent on a mission to investigate the disappearance of residents in Los Angeles.

=== Kuroko Shirai ===
Voiced by: Satomi Arai (Japanese); Alison Viktorin (English)

Kuroko Shirai (白井 黒子) is a first-year student and Mikoto Misaka's kōhai. She is one of the main protagonists of A Certain Scientific Railgun. Kuroko is a Level 4 esper with an ability called "Teleport" (空間移動(テレポート), Terepōto; lit. "Spatial Movement") which allows her to teleport herself or objects she touches under a total weight of around 130–137 kilograms (287–302 lb) to anywhere within a radius of around 81–85 metres (266–279 ft), but her ability it requires an amount of concentration for successful execution. She is a member of Judgment and generally carries a strap of nails around her thighs, which she used during her work to pin down enemies. Kuroko has an obsessive and perverted crush on Mikoto, whom she addresses as "Onē-sama" (おねえさま, revered big sister) or "Sissy" in the anime series' English dub. She is on the constant lookout for a chance to get physically intimate with her, which ends up in her being electrocuted. She gets jealous of other people who got Mikoto's attention, mostly Toma Kamijo. Kuroko officially debuts in the eighth volume of A Certain Magical Index when she investigates a robbery of the remnants of the Tree Diagram and discovers Mikoto's involvement in the incident. She gets injured by Awaki Musujime during their fight in a restaurant, but she is later saved by Tōma and Mikoto before Awaki can unleash an enormous teleported mass on her. After the events surrounding the Tree Diagram, Kuroko has been a wheelchair user for some time because of the injuries she sustained from the battle. In A Certain Magical Index: Genesis Testament, Kuroko works with Anti-Skill to apprehend the members of the dark side organization during Operation Handcuffs and later teams up with Toma, Alice Anotherbible, and Yōen Hanatsuyu to stop the rampage of Frillsand #G following the conclusion of the operation.

=== Accelerator ===
Voiced by: Nobuhiko Okamoto (Japanese); Austin Tindle (English)

Accelerator (一方通行(アクセラレータ), Akuserarēta) is one of the central characters in the science side in A Certain Magical Index, as well as the main protagonist and titular character of A Certain Scientific Accelerator. He is the most powerful Level 5 esper in Academy City with an eponymous ability that allows him to control any vector he touches, ranking him at the top of the seven Level 5s in the city. Since his natural ability blocks all ultraviolet radiation, he has an appearance with white hair. His name is written as "Ippōtsūkō", meaning "One-Way Road". His real name is unknown, though Accelerator recalls his surname is composed of two kanji characters, and his given name consists of three kanji characters. First appearing as an antagonist in the third volume, he later becomes the main protagonist in the science side.

Accelerator's unique ability makes him the subject of an experiment attempting to create the first Level 6 esper, in which according to the city's best supercomputer known as the Tree Diagram (which is destroyed by Index's Dragon Breath), this feat can only be achieved by killing Misaka Mikoto 128 times without a single failure. Since it is impossible to procure 128 results out of a single target, an alternative plan is formed to "level up" Accelerator by having him kill 20,000 of her clones. He willingly joins the experiment to gain a reputation as the most powerful and feared esper so that no one can be foolish enough to challenge him. His desire to achieve this goal leads him to kill many who gets in his way. Mikoto tries to stop the experiment to save her clones, but it is Toma Kamijo who finally does so and defeats Accelerator after discovering his weakness of being physically weak because of his total reliance on his powers and his overconfidence in his esper abilities. Therefore, Toma beat him with his Imagine Breaker and street-fighting skills.

The fifth volume reveals his past where he is taken to Academy City at a young age after his ability was first discovered but because of the lack of understanding, people fear him and in some cases attempt to kill him. Due to the many attempts on his life and the numerous experiments performed on him, these events shape Accelerator into a sadist and makes it difficult for him to trust anyone except for Kikyō Yoshikawa, the only scientist who cares about him and saves his life. He also takes a more heroic and fatherly role by protecting a young girl named Last Order, the last Misaka clone who believes through the memories of the Sister clones who fought him that Accelerator is not a bad person and never wanted to hurt the clones but tried to merely intimidate them into not fighting him, a theory Accelerator dismisses. In the aftermath of the incident, Accelerator is shot in the head by Ao Amai and acquires aphasia due to brain damage. The injury also affects his ability but Heaven Canceller jury-rigs a choker-like device to his brain, allowing Accelerator to tap into the Misaka Network to make up for his injury and function normally. He can also switch the transmitter to full power, restoring his ability for a maximum of 15 minutes in the beginning, but the time is later extended to 30 minutes by an update to the device. Toward the end of the thirteenth volume, Accelerator begins to "awaken" after nearly being killed by Amata Kihara and his aphasia is somehow temporarily cured. He truly "awakens" in the fifteenth volume, gaining black wings when fighting another "awakened" Level 5 esper, Teitoku Kakine. In the events of the nineteenth volume, he meets Aiwass, a higher dimensional being, summoned to their plane of existence. Aiwass explains to him when AIM entities like him are manifested, Last Order is heavily strained and may die if left untreated. To help Last Order, who has collapsed from sustaining Aiwass, Accelerator follows Aiwass's advice and heads to Russia during World War III in search of Index, unaware that he has met her before.

In Russia, after being ambushed by Russian mages, he acquires the Goatskin, a mysterious document sought after by both Academy City and the Russian government that contains knowledge about the Archangels and Heaven, and later runs into a clone known as Misaka Worst, learning that Aleister intends to eliminate Last Order, now obsolete to create a new Misaka network. Despite being more powerful than Misaka Worst, Accelerator is unable to bring himself to harm another clone after the Level 6 experiment and becomes mentally unstable after the clone attempts to kill Last Order and later tries to kill herself. Accelerator goes on a rampage until Toma arrives where he turns his frustration regarding Last Order's condition into him and a fight ensues between the two. After Accelerator is defeated again, Toma uses his Imagine Breaker to stabilize Last Order and leaves a note informing him of Index's true whereabouts. Later, he joins forces with Elizarinian soldiers and Misaka Worst to find spies in their country and fights Archangel Gabriel along with Hyōka Kazakiri, where after studying the Goatskin, he learns to understand the angel's language and turns himself into an angel as a side effect. With his new powers, he can decode one of Index's songs and is finally able to cure Last Order but is injured in the process.

After World War III, Accelerator is given his freedom with the help of Shiage Hamazura, after he threatens the Academy City's administration to leave him, Last Order, and Misaka Worst alone and orders them to stop all illegal black projects in the city. However, both he and Shiage actions anger a new group of espers called the "Freshmen" who are aware of the existences of magic and sees them as an obstacle in Academy City's war against the magic factions. After being helped by Toma and Leivinia Birdway, the latter invites him to join the world of magic and brings him in an operation in Hawaii. With the apparent death of Aleister Crowley against and the full authority of the Board Chairman from the dying Aleister Crowley, become the new Board Chairman of Academy City.

=== Shiage Hamazura ===
Voiced by: Satoshi Hino (Japanese); Clifford Chapin (English)

Shiage Hamazura (浜面 仕上) is one of the main characters in the science side in A Certain Magical Index. He is a former member of Skill-Out, a group of Level 0s who use various means to counter esper abilities, who accidentally gets caught up with the Dark Side of Academy City. He is first introduced in the Side Story novels where he became the leader of his Skill-Out gang after Accelerator killed the former leader, his best friend Ritoku Komaba on the orders of the Board of Directors. On the same day he became the new leader, his gang was forced by the Board of Directors to kill Mikoto's mother, Misuzu, or face extermination. However, he and his gang were defeated by Tōma and Accelerator and they failed to kill Misuzu. Humiliated, he left the gang to his friend Hattori Hanzo and became a chauffeur and informant for Team ITEM where he fell in love with one of their members, Rikō Takitsubo.

During the 15th novel, Team ITEM is involved in a war between the various underground organization where Shiage helps them by providing transport by stealing cars around the city. But when Team ITEM is defeated by Team SCHOOL led by its leader, Teitoku Kakine, Shizuri Mugino, the leader of Team ITEM, wants revenge for being humiliated no matter what and forces an injured Rikō to use her powers to find Teitoku despite the fact that repeated use of her powers will kill her. In order to save Rikō, Shiage fights against Shizuri and despite the odds, he manages to defeat Shizuri by using her pride and powers against her. However, this unexpected incident becomes a thorn in Aleister's plans as there was no way Shiage could defeat Shizuri as she is a Level 5. Seeing him as an unpredictable anomaly that will disrupt his future plans, Aleister puts a bounty on Shiage and orders the forces of Academy City's dark side to kill him. Ironically, he is saved by Shizuri, who survived their battle and now has a sense of twisted love for him (declaring she will castrate him as her sign of affection). She lets him and Rikō escape Academy City by stealing a jet and shoots down his pursuers, declaring that he is her prey and hers alone.

Shiage and Rikō escape to Russia only to find themselves in a war between Academy City and Russia. After being saved by Acqua of the Back, Shiage and Rikō head to the nation of Elizarina where Rikō is partially healed by Accelerator and aids Acqua. In order to protect a document called the Kremlin Report, Shiage and Rikō head towards the same nuclear military base that Mikoto went to while they were being chased by Academy City forces and later Shizuri. However, Shizuri collapses from over-exhaustion as her fragile body is suffering from the effects of using too much Body Crystal, a dangerous drug that Rikō uses to activate her powers. Unable to see her this way, Shiage begs Shizuri to let go of her pride and see reason and be the Shizuri that use to care for her teammates which strokes a cord within her and makes peace with him as she protects him and Rikō from the rest of the invading Academy City forces. After capturing a member of the Board of Directors who led the Academy City forces and torturing him, he reveals to Shiage a document called the Parameter List, which reveals that the Academy City administration has been secretly interfering with the Power Curriculum Program and preventing most of the city's students from gaining or raising their powers.

After the Third World War, Shiage is given amnesty and the assassination order on him removed thanks to Accelerator and makes a deal with the Academy City's administration, where he will not expose the truth about the Parameter List and he, along with Rikō and Shizuri is allowed to return to Academy City to reform Team ITEM. However, his and Accelerator's actions have made them enemies with a new group of espers called the "Freshmen" who is aware of the existence of Magic who sees both of them as an obstacle in Academy City's war against the Magic factions. After Tōma and Leivinia help him and Accelerator against the "Freshmen", Tōma introduces them to the world of Magic and involved in an operation in Hawaii.

=== Teitoku Kakine ===
Voiced by: Matsukaze Masaya (Japanese); Daman Mills (English)

Teitoku Kakine (垣根 帝督) is the leader of SCHOOL. He is Academy City's second most powerful Level 5 esper with an ability called "Dark Matter" (未元物質(ダークマター), Dāku Mat; lit. "Unknown Matter") which allows him to create and control an unknown matter unbounded by laws of physics. Teitoku is Aleister Crowley's spare plan if Accelerator fails to meet his expectations, which he finds undesirable. He later sparks a revolution by orchestrating an assassination attempt on Monaka Oyafune to disrupt the security in Elementary Particle Engineering Laboratory that houses the Tweezers. Teitoku plans on using it to grab a minuscule machine called "UNDER_LINE" that serves as Aleister's sole method of collecting information while inside the Windowless Building, helping him contact the Board Chairman. However, he decides to kill Accelerator instead because he has not gained any leverage to serve as a bargain for Aleister. Teitoku then tortures Kazari Uiharu for information about Last Order's location when Accelerator shows up. The two engage in a fight, during which they both become awakened by their hidden powers, until Accelerator hardly beats Teitoku, ripping apart most of his body. His brain is later preserved in Dark Legacy, a tool created by Heaven Canceller which rapidly reproduces cells to keep anything alive. Teitoku returns in the sixth volume of A Certain Magical Index: New Testament when he manages to recreate his body. During the Ichihanaran Festival, he is requested by Yuītsu Kihara to capture Fräulein Kreutune. He summons Dark Matter-made Japanese rhinoceros beetles called "White Beetle" to hunt down her while he fights Accelerator for his revenge. However, one of the White Beetles loses its programmed command because of Rikō Takitsubo's AIM Stalker ability and starts to take over the system, becoming the new Teitoku named Beetle 05 which possesses a caring personality. The original Teitoku is taken by Ollerus, who disguises himself as Thor, to create the Lance of Gungnir for GREMLIN.

He is also the protagonist of his own spin-off series A Certain Scientific Dark Matter.

=== Misaki Shokuhō ===
Voiced by: Azumi Asakura (Japanese); Teri Rogers (English)

Misaki Shokuhō (食蜂 操祈) is a second-year student who leads the largest clique in the school, earning her the title "The Queen of Tokiwadai". She is Academy City's #5 Level 5 esper, and has an ability called Mental Out (心理掌握(メンタルアウト), Mentaru Auto; lit. "Psychological Control") that uses remote controls hidden in her sling bag to execute her mind-related powers such as mind reading, telepathy, brainwashing, psychometry, and memory erasure. However, her power cannot be used on Electromasters, animals and machines. It also does not affect Tōma Kamijō. Misaki does not trust anyone whose minds she cannot read, with the exception of Tōma. She often prefers to hide from the public, and sends her followers or a mind-controlled individual as her representative instead.

Misaki is involved in the Exterior Project that would greatly boost her power by cultivating a cut portion of her brain's cerebral cortex. She is then requested by researchers of the Clone Dolly Project to act as Dolly's missing friend aliased "Mi-chan" by altering her memories that would make Misaki the friend in her mind. Misaki eventually learns about the researchers' plan of disposing of her upon the Exterior's completion. She decides to brainwash the scientists involved in the project and take over the building.

Misaki's backstory makes a debut in the eleventh volume of New Testament: A Certain Magical Index light novel series when she bumped into Tōma for the first time at an intersection road during her early days as a first-year student. She then meets him several times during the summer and receives a cheap whistle from him to be used for emergencies, which she greatly treasured. Their meeting is short-lived when Misaki was targeted by an organization called "Deadlock", causing Tōma to get badly injured after he protected her from their attacks using his body. Misaki uses her power to manipulate his brain's fluids, which would cut off his sense of pain and lets the EMT continue treating him, but she finds her treatment ineffective because of his low blood pressure, leaving him brain damage that caused him unable to remember or make memories with her.

In the Ichihanaran Festival story arc, Misaki prevents Mikoto Misaka from taking a trial enrollment in Tōma's high school by making mind-controlled individuals chase after her. She then competes in a swimsuit contest against Seria Kumokawa. In the Agitate Halation story arc, Misaki helps Tōma in finding the magician who infiltrated the School Garden. She later joins Tōma in London along with Mikoto as he confronts the Golden Dawn magic cabal during the Coronzon story arc. Misaki is heavily involved in the Kamijō story arc as she becomes mentally unstable due to her confusion between Tōma's doppelganger, who could remember her, and the real one, who retained the brain damage that prevented him from remembering or making memories with her. Misaki is last seen in a hospital where she was confined because of the injuries she sustained from her fight against Anna Sprengel to acquire the vaccine for a dying Tōma.

She is also the protagonist of her own spin-off series A Certain Scientific Mental Out.

== Science side ==
=== Schools in Academy City ===
==== Toma Kamijo's unnamed high school ====
- Komoe Tsukuyomi (月詠 小萌)
  Voiced by: Kimiko Koyama (Japanese); Jad Saxton (English)
  Komoe Tsukuyomi is the homeroom teacher of Toma Kamijo's class. She is well-known for her height of 135 centimetres (53 in) yet is an adult who loves to drink beers and smoke cigarettes, and appears to be childish in her voice and mannerism as she contradicts her age in front of her students by ending her sentences with desu (a Japanese copula). Komoe does not possess an esper power but becomes capable of casting a healing spell after helping in treating Index and Aisa Himegami. She is regarded as one of the school's seven mysteries and postulated by Accelerator to be a successful test subject for an experiment involving ways to stop cell aging. A Certain Magical Index light novel author Kazuma Kamachi revealed that she is the oldest character he introduced so far.
- Motoharu Tsuchimikado (土御門 元春)
  Voiced by: Anri Katsu (Japanese); Newton Pittman (English)
  Motoharu Tsuchimikado is an onmyōdō magician from Necessarius, with Fallere825 ("the backstabbing blade") as his magic name, and one of Toma Kamijo's best friends after infiltrating Academy City as a spy. He is also a Level 0 esper with an ability called "Auto-Rebirth" (肉体再生(オートリバース), Ōto Ribāsu; lit. "Body Regeneration") which allows him to repair damaged blood vessels, making him the only successful magician-esper hybrid but limiting his use of magic. Motoharu is always seen wearing sunglasses and an aloha shirt, and ends his sentences with nya (an onomatopoeia equivalent to the Japanese word for "meow"). He is deeply involved during the events of the Angel Fall spell incident, in a manhunt of Oriana Thomson amid Daihasei Festival in Academy City, in a mission with Toma to retrieve the Document of Constantine in France, and during the uprising of several dark side organizations in Academy City as the de facto leader of GROUP. Motoharu's major appearance in A Certain Magical Index: New Testament centers around the involvement of his stepsister Maika when he begins investigating the Agitate Halation Project and attempts to escape Academy City with her after shooting Aleister Crowley for failing to keep her safe in the city. Motoharu is last seen at Tahiti along with Maika in the final volume.
- Pierce Aogami (青髪 ピアス, Aogami Piasu; lit. "blue hair and piercings")
  Voiced by: Yoshihisa Kawahara (Japanese); Scott Freeman (Index I, Index II, Railgun S, Endymion), Patrick McAlister (Index III, Railgun T) (English)
  Pierce Aogami is one of Toma Kamijo's best friends and the president of their class. His name is an aptronym based on his appearance, with his true name remaining a secret to this day, but most of his admirers call him Blau (a German word for "blue"). He is always seen tagging along with Toma and Motoharu, with them forming "the three idiots of the class" (クラスの三バカ), and is proud of his fetish for any kind of girl. In A Certain Scientific Railgun franchise, he is revealed to be an S-ranked Dream Ranker, one of the highest ranks in creating dreams for Indian Poker cards.
- Aisa Himegami (姫神 秋沙)
  Voiced by: Mamiko Noto (Japanese); Lindsay Seidel (English)
  Aisa Himegami is a rare esper who wears miko clothing and has an ability called "Deep Blood", which attracts vampires with her sweet blood scent. Her life becomes miserable after her power killed her family and friends, causing her to arrive in Academy City for a cure and meet Aurelous Izzard. After Toma Kamijo rescued her from Aurelous, Aisa is given a Celtic cross necklace by Necessarius to restrain her power, moves into Komoe Tsukuyomi's apartment, and transfers from Kirigaoka Girls' Academy to Toma's high school. Aisa begins showing feelings for Toma but jokingly compares his life to a dating sim because of his involvement with other girls. Kamachi wrote the character as a "girl who couldn't become the story's heroine".
- Aiho Yomikawa (黄泉川 愛穂)
  Voiced by: Yūko Kaida (Japanese); Martha Harms (English)
  Aiho Yomikawa is a physical education teacher and an Anti-Skill officer. She is known for wearing a green jersey that outlines her large breasts and ending her sentences with jan. Aiho's colleagues at Anti-Skill call her the "woman who makes the serious comical" due to her habit of subduing delinquents with protective gears like riot shields and helmets. She becomes the guardian of Accelerator and Last Order after her friend Kikyō Yoshikawa asked a favor to take care of them.
- Seiri Fukiyose (吹寄 制理)
  Voiced by: Ayumi Fujimura (Japanese); Skyler McIntosh (English)
  Seiri Fukiyose is one of Toma Kamijo's classmates and acts as their class president despite the position being held by Pierce Aogami. Her appearance is described as "pretty but lacks sex appeal" and has a big forehead, which she uses for her special move called "Fukiyose Forehead DX". She has a crush on Toma but acts tsundere when in his presence, hating him for blaming his life on misfortunes. Seiri is a health freak due to her frequent ordering of different health products from shopping channels.
- Suama Oyafune (親船 素甘)
  Voiced by: Yumi Hara (Japanese); Natalie Hoover (English)
  Suama Oyafune is a math teacher and Monaka's daughter. She shows an obsession with her beauty as she takes multiple baths a day, puts on lotion before going to bed, eats breakfast every day, keeps her weight in check, spends her morning hours putting on makeup, and buys Western clothes from shopping channels.
- Saigo (災誤)
  Voiced by: Bryan Massey (English)
  Saigo is a teacher and counsels students when Suama Oyafune requests him by whistling. Saigo is mistaken for Acqua of the Back by Itsuwa when she finds him chasing after Toma Kamijo.
- Seria Kumokawa (雲川 芹亜)
  Voiced by: Yukiyo Fujii
  Seria Kumokawa is Maria's older sister and a third-year student who serves as Tsugutoshi Kaizumi's advisor and the leader of his Use of Force Unit. She is usually seen wearing the school-issued sailor uniform that shows her navel between the blouse and skirt. Seria knows Toma Kamijo even before his memory loss and has regrets about having limited control over his frequent involvement in dangerous situations. She has romantic feelings for him, causing a rift between her and Misaki Shokuhō. Seria does not have special powers yet her skills can rival Misaki's Mental Out ability since she defeats her opponents using intelligence and psychology.

==== Tokiwadai Middle School ====
- Tokiwadai Dorm Supervisor (寮監, Ryōkan)
  Voiced by: Shizuka Okohira (Index), Hitomi Nabatame (Railgun) (Japanese); Cynthia Cranz (English)
  The Tokiwadai Dorm Supervisor is the unnamed housemaster of the dormitory that Mikoto Misaka and Kuroko Shirai reside. She strictly enforces the rules for all residences and has zero tolerance for violators, becoming feared among the students. She is also a volunteer caretaker for the Child Errors in Asunaro Park, where she shows her great affection towards children instead of her usual scary and fearsome nature.
- Mitsuko Kongō (婚后 光子)
  Voiced by: Minako Kotobuki (Japanese); Jamie Marchi (English)
  Mitsuko Kongō is a transfer student and heiress to Kongō Airlines. She is a Level 4 esper with an ability called "Aero Hand" (空力使い(エアロハンド), Earo Hando; lit. "Vacuum User") which allows her to create a powerful gust of wind to propel any objects she touches like a missile. Mitsuko shows pride in herself despite being a new student in the school but shows ignorance of common routines such as finding directions and kitchen-related work. She is usually seen carrying a fan that she usually uses for her ability and has a pet boa constrictor named Ekaterina. Mitsuko is first introduced as a minor character in the eighth volume of A Certain Magical Index light novel when she tells Kuroko Shirai about her plan to create a clique in the school and hears Mikoto Misaka's power being tested at a swimming pool.
- Kinuho Wannai (湾内 絹保)
  Voiced by: Haruka Tomatsu (Japanese); Kristi Kang (English)
  Kinuho Wannai is Kuroko Shirai's classmate and Mitsuko Kongō's friend. She is a Level 3 esper with an ability called "Hydro Hand" (水流操作(ハイドロハンド), Haidoro Hando; lit. "Water Current Manipulation") which allows her to manipulate water with a maximum volume of 400 litres (400,000 mL) in four separate clumps and launch them within a range of 18 metres (59 ft). She befriends Mikoto Misaka after she is saved by her from delinquents during her early days as a transferee student. Kinuho has a small cameo appearance in the sixteenth volume of A Certain Magical Index: New Testament light novel when she joins an expedition to destroy the Crystal Tower that guides the creatures known as Elements. She briefly converses with Toma Kamijo but immediately runs away due to her shyness.
- Ma'aya Awatsuki (泡浮 万彬)
  Voiced by: Yoshino Nanjō (Japanese); Tia Ballard (English)
  Ma'aya Awatsuki is Mitsuko Kongō's friend and a member of the school's swimming team along with Kinuho Wannai. She is a Level 3 esper with an ability called "Float Dial" (流体反発(フロートダイヤル), Furōto Daiyaru; lit. "Fluid Repulsion") which allows her to manipulate the surrounding's buoyancy to lift heavy objects, walk on water without breaking its surface tension, and leap several meters.
- Mitsuki Unabara (海原 光貴)
  Voiced by: Daisuke Kishio (Japanese); Justin Pate (English)
  Mitsuki Unabara is the grandson of the school's director. He is a Level 4 esper with an ability called "Telekinesis" (念動力(テレキネシス), Terekineshisu; lit. "Telekinetic Force") which allows him to control objects from a distance. Mitsuki manages to get the best grades in his class through cheating by putting a thin layer of his power on the computer used for the exam, examining the minute heat and radiation, and reverse-engineering the correct answers. He is later abducted by Etzali to take his form and begin his mission of investigating Toma Kamijo's influence.
- Junko Hokaze (帆風 潤子)
  Voiced by: Minami Tsuda (Japanese); Michelle Lee (English)
  Junko Hokaze is a third-year student known for her ringlet-styled curly hair and the most loyal member of Misaki Shokuhō's clique. She is a Level 4 esper with an ability called "Rampage Dress" (天衣装着(ランペイジドレス), Ranpeiji Doresu; lit. "Heavenly Garment Equipping") which allows her to manipulate her body cells' electric signals to achieve certain results like an increased sensitivity of her olfaction by enhancing her olfactory cells and superhuman maneuver by boosting her muscle cells. Junko is the protagonist of the spin-off manga series A Certain Scientific Railgun: Astral Buddy and makes an appearance in the eleventh volume of A Certain Magical Index: New Testament light novel when she finds Misaki visiting Seria Kumokawa for information regarding her memories with Toma Kamijo. During the heatwave incident in Academy City, Junko offers Misaki her help in carrying Toma to the infirmary but gets declined instead.
- Watanabe (綿辺)
  Voiced by: Saitō Yuka (Japanese); Brianna Roberts (English)
  Watanabe is an elderly teacher of the school and an acquaintance of Komoe Tsukuyomi. She prevents the festival committee from recruiting Mikoto Misaka to demonstrate in the opening ceremony of the Daihasei Festival because of the rumors with her involvement. Watanabe is later brainwashed by Misaki Shokuhō to escort Mikoto in her clique.
- Satori Kobayashi (口囃子 早鳥)
  Voiced by: Hazuki Ogino (Japanese); Sarah Roach (English)
  Satori Kobayashi is a third-year student and a member of Misaki Shokuhō's clique. She is a Level 3 esper with an ability called "Telepath" (念話能力(テレパス), Terepasu; lit. "Mind Induction") which allows her to telepathically communicate with someone she connects with a "circuit", an extension of her AIM diffusion field.
- Megumi Kirifu (切斑 芽美)
  Voiced by: Naoko Komatsu (Japanese); Meg McClain (English)
  Megumi Kirifu is a student and Level 4 esper with an ability related to telekinesis. She is invited by Mitsuko Kongō to join her clique but teases her by moving her fan telekinetically until she realizes the prank results in Mitsuko's accident. She later apologizes and refuses her recruitment offer. During the Daihasei Festival in Academy City, Megumi is part of the school's team for the Balloon Hunter game alongside Misaka 10032, and later in the Cavalry Battle game together with Kinuho Wannai and Ma'aya Awatsuki.
- Ayu Mitsuari (蜜蟻愛愉)
  Voiced by: Yumiri Hanamori
  Ayu Mitsuari is a first-year student introduced in the eleventh volume of A Certain Magical Index: New Testament light novel as the antagonist for Misaki Shokuhō. She is a Level 3 esper with an ability called "Mental Stinger" (心理穿孔(メンタルスティンガー), Mentaru Sutingā; lit. "Psychological Perforation") in which she uses smartphones to manipulate the moisture of the target's brain and control its fluid distribution and chemical secretion. Ayu has a grudge against Misaki because the latter is selected as a candidate for Level 5 instead of her and her wish to be saved by Toma Kamijo from her suicide attempt is interrupted by her as well.
- Yuri Sakibasu (咲蓮誘璃, Sakibasu Yuri)
  Yuri Sakibasu is a first-year student and member of Misaki Shokuhō's clique. She is at least a Level 3 esper with an ability called "Carbon Search" (有機探査(カーボンサーチ), Kābon Sāchi; lit. "Organic Exploration") which allows her to precisely measure carbon isotopes of an object. Yuri is a talented violinist skilled in playing the genuine Stativarius that she is able to obtain from an auction with the help of her ability.
- Iruka Yumiya (弓箭入鹿)
  Iruka Yumiya is the younger sister of Rakko and the captain of the school's archery club. She is a Level 4 esper with an ability called "Wave Conductor" (波動操作(ウェイブコンダクター), Weibu Kondakutā; lit. "Wave Manipulation") which allows her to control light and sound waves. Her right eye hidden by her peek-a-boo hairstyle contains a prism that can combine with her ability to turn the light around her into lasers. Iruka serves as one of the antagonists in Astral Buddy until she reconciles with Junko Hokaze, whom she reveres since their first meeting back in the Ideal lab. She later teams up with Junko to foil Ayu Mitsuari's plan and save Senya Yūri. She eventually finds Gunha Sogīta a rival to her affection for Junko upon his arrival in their fight against Seigo Hōjō.
- Arei Hōjō (北条彩鈴, Houjou Arei)
  Arei Hōjō is a third-year technical exchange student and the younger sister of Seigo. She is a Level 2 esper with an ability called "Whisper Bell" (感情音叉(ウィスパーベル), Wisupā Beru; lit. "Emotional Tuning Fork") which allows her to hear the target's emotions as a sound to identify their location, direction, and distance. She is also a ninja specialized in using kunai. Arei's esper level is not within the school's admission requirements yet she is allowed to be enrolled because her ability is considered as a Level 3.
- Komaki Makigami (牧上 小牧)
  Komaki Makigami is Kuroko Shirai's colleague at Judgment 3 Branch Office and a member of Misaki Shokuhō's clique. She is at least a Level 3 esper with an optical control-related ability that allows herself and the objects she touches to become invisible to the naked eye, but she needs to move quietly since making sounds can give away her location.
- Kiyoshi Kessai (潔斎 雪紫)
  Kiyoshi Kessai is a first-year student and a member of Reiri Hasekura's clique. She is the roommate of Mikoto Misaka, whom she addresses as 'Mikoto-chan', before being replaced by Kuroko Shirai.
- Rurikakesu Shin'enkōji (神苑小路 瑠璃懸巣)
  Rurikakesu Shin'enkōji, or Ruri, is a second-year student who befriends Mikoto Misaka. She is known for her gyaru appearance and signature roundhouse kick to vending machines with a "Chaser!" shout, which inspires Mikoto to emulate.
- Reiri Hasekura (支倉 冷理)
  Reiri Hasekura is a third-year student and the leader of one of the oldest of the "big three" cliques in the school before the popularity of Misaki Shokuhō's clique.
- Nagisa Mikagami (水鏡 凪紗)
  Nagisa Mikagami is a third-year student and the leader of one of the "big three" cliques in the school before the rise of Misaki Shokuhō's clique. She is at least a Level 3 esper with an oil control-related ability that allows her to manipulate the target's oil component. Nagisa uses her ability to reward her clique members with the most contribution by manipulating their body fats to enhance their bust or slim them down.
- Danshan Sha (沙 淡扇(シア=タンシャン), Shia Tanshan)
  Danshan Sha is a second-year student and the leader of the largest of the "big three" cliques in the school before Misaki Shokuhō's clique takes over, earning her the nickname "Infirmary Empress". Her leadership helps Tokiwadai to become one of the top five schools in Academy City.

==== Nagatenjōki Academy ====
- Shinobu Nunotaba (布束 砥信)
  Voiced by: Ikumi Hayama (Japanese); Mariela Ortiz (English)
  Shinobu Nunotaba is a third-year high school student and the designer of the machine called "Testament" for the Radio Noise Project (or Sisters Project). She adherently wears a gothic lolita clothes aside from her school uniform and lab coat. Shinobu has her trademark fish-like eyes in the manga, which do not appear in the anime adaptation of the character. She is reassigned to the Level 6 Shift Project when Mikoto Misaka's clones from the Radio Noise Project are reused for it. After conversing with one of the clones, Shinobu's perspective about their purpose changes. This causes her to quit the project and plan on stopping it by distributing cash cards in alleyways where the experiment takes place. Shinobu is later taken down by Saiai Kinuhata when she infiltrates one of the laboratories involved in the project to install an emotion program throughout the Misaka Network. In A Certain Scientific Railgun S, Shinobu is dragged into an organization called "STUDY" to create Febri and Janie. She tells Febri to look for Mikoto and helps her escape because of her trauma about her research being used for their creation.
- Asako Jōnan (城南 朝来)
  Voiced by: Fuyuka Ōra
  Asako Jōnan is a supervisor for the school's Power Curriculum Program and an officer of Anti-Skill, who is introduced in the original video animation of A Certain Scientific Railgun anime series. She is removed from her school position after failing to develop a Level 5 esper. Asako then plans an experiment that tests Electromasters' reaction to stimuli, which results in Mikoto Misaka becoming a victim.
- Mio Aizono (相園 美央)
  Voiced by: Rie Tanaka
  Mio Aizono is the main antagonist of the 2011 PSP game A Certain Scientific Railgun. She is a Level 4 esper with an ability called "Military Oil" (油性兵装(ミリタリーオイル), Miritarī Oiru; lit. "Oil-based Armament") which allows her to manipulate oil and transform it into various weapons. Mio is a test subject of White Alligator, a project designed to make an esper move past the set limits of Academy City's Parameter List.

==== Kirigaoka Girls' Academy ====
- Hyōka Kazakiri (風斬 氷華)
  Voiced by: Kana Asumi (Japanese); Alexis Tipton (English)
  Hyōka Kazakiri is a mysterious top student and considered by Index as her first friend. She is an unidentified high-level esper with an ability called "Counter Stop" (正体不明(カウンターストップ), Kauntā Sutoppu; lit. "Unknown Identity") as a reference to her phantom-like appearance. Hyōka is discovered to be an aggregation of esper's AIM diffusion fields that they release unknowingly and is referred to as the Key to the Imaginary Number District, a hidden realm formed from the same discharged AIM diffusion fields inside Academy City. Hyōka officially debuts in the sixth volume of A Certain Magical Index when she meets Index for the first time after manifesting herself in the real world. During the infiltration of Vento of the Front in the city, Hyōka is activated by Aleister Crowley into her artificial angel mode called "Fuse Kazakiri" (ヒューズ=カザキリ, Hyūzu Kazakiri) as a countermeasure against her rampage. She returns during the World War III story arc in the same mode to restrain Archangel Gabriel.
- Awaki Musujime (結標 淡希, Musujime Awaki)
  Voiced by: Harumi Sakurai (Japanese); Bryn Apprill (English)
  Awaki Musujime is a second-year high school student and the guide for visitors inside the Windowless Building. She is a Level 4 esper with an ability called "Move Point" (座標移動(ムーブポイント), Mūbu Pointo; lit. "Coordinate Movement") which allows her to teleport anyone or anything she points with her flashlight under a maximum weight of 4,520 kilograms (9,960 lb) to a maximum radius of 800 metres (2,600 ft). Awaki's ability is more powerful than Kuroko Shirai's, but she is reluctant to teleport herself because of her trauma of accidentally teleporting her leg inside a wall in her childhood, which results in its skin and muscles tearing up. She officially debuts in the eighth volume of A Certain Magical Index when she is hired by an outside organization called "Science Association" to retrieve the remnants of the Tree Diagram. Awaki tells Kuroko during their fight in a restaurant about her plan of testing animals to see if they can receive esper powers. She breaks down after being rebuked by Kuroko for her reasoning in going with this plan and teleports a huge amount of mass on her. A fleeing Awaki is defeated by Accelerator as he destroys the suitcase containing the remnants. She is later coerced to join the dark side organization GROUP for her captured comrades' safety. Awaki later hears the BLOCK's plan of using her captured friends in District 10's Reformatory as a bargaining chip in exchange for her assistance to help the mercenaries infiltrate the Windowless Building. She then successfully defeats Megumi Teshio after overcoming her trauma to use her power against her.
- Mitori Kōzaku (警策 看取, Kōzaku Mitori)
  Voiced by: Miyu Tomita (Japanese); Rachel Michelle Thompson (English)
  Mitori Kōzaku is a third-year middle school student who is nicknamed "Mi-chan" by Dolly. She is a Level 4 esper with an ability called "Liquid Shadow" (液化人影(リキッドシャドウ), Rikiddo Shadō; lit. "Liquefaction Figure") in which she has a free control of her preferred liquid metal with a specific gravity of 20 or higher. Mitori is a test subject of Clone Dolly Project, where she befriends Dolly. She soon finds out about Dolly's neglected health and threatens a researcher about revealing the project to the public if no necessary treatment is done for her. This is when she learns about the involvement of the Board of Directors on the project, causing her hatred towards them as she becomes the intermediary of MEMBER to use the team for her revenge against the board members. By the end of the Daihasei Festival, Mitori is helped by Misaki Shokuhō to reunite with Dolly.

==== Sakugawa Middle School ====
- Kazari Uiharu (初春 飾利)
  Voiced by: Aki Toyosaki (Japanese); Cherami Leigh (English)
  Kazari Uiharu is a first-year student who shares the same class with Ruiko Saiten. She is a Level 1 esper with an ability called "Thermal Hand" (定温保存(サーマルハンド), Sāmaru Hando; lit. "Fixed Temperature Preservation") which allows her to keep the current temperature of basketball-sized objects she touches, but this ability is only revealed to Erī Haru'ue. Kazari is a member of Judgment alongside Kuroko Shirai, where she displays various computer-related skills such as hacking and surveillance. She wears a headband made of artificial flowers and craves sweet foods which she misses a chance to enjoy as she is being called for work right away. Aside from her role as one of the protagonists of A Certain Scientific Railgun franchise, Kazari also makes a cameo appearance in A Certain Magical Index franchise.
- Ruiko Saten (佐天 涙子)
  Voiced by: Kanae Itō (Japanese); Brina Palencia (English)
  Ruiko Saten is a first-year student and Kazari Uiharu's close friend. She is a Level 0 esper yet has shown a low-level version of Mitsuko Kongō's ability when she manages to move leaves on her palm by a small gust of wind after using the Level Upper. Ruiko loses her power by the conclusion of the incident revolving around Level Upper but shows no remorse anymore as she learns to appreciate her current state. She shamelessly teases Kazari by flipping her skirt in public and loves to read urban legends. Ruiko has a small cameo in the fifteenth volume of A Certain Magical Index: New Testament when she drags Kazari away from a mob for safety and passes by Toma Kamijo wearing a Bunny Grey costume.
- Erī Haru'ue (春上 衿衣)
  Voiced by: Kana Hanazawa (Japanese); Carrie Savage (English)
  Erī Haru'ue is a Child Error and transfer student who shares the same class as Kazari Uiharu and Ruiko Saten. She is a Level 2 esper with an ability called "Telepathy" (精神感応(テレパス), Terepasu; lit. "Mind Induction") which allows her to telepathically communicate with other people and can be increased above her normal level when being exposed to certain frequencies. Erī keeps a locket that contains a photo of Banri Edasaki, who gets separated from her after transferring to another Child Error facility. She can hear her beckoning voice in her mind, causing her to feel a daze and a poltergeist-like phenomenon around her area. In Railgun S, Erī is targeted by Therestina Kihara Lifeline because of her potential to become a Level 6 esper. She is saved by Mikoto and her friends and later reunites with Banri.
- Banri Edasaki (枝先 絆理)
  Voiced by: Satomi Satō (Japanese); Luci Christian (English)
  Banri Edasaki is a Child Error and transfer student whom Harumi Kiyama considers as a valued student. She possesses telepathic ability as she can telepathically communicate with Erī Haru'ue. Banri is in a coma when she is found by Harumi and Heaven Canceller. She is later saved by Mikoto and her friends from Therestina Kihara Lifeline, who plans to use her and the other children for an experiment involving Body Crystals. She regains consciousness and reunites with her teacher. Banri later moves into Erī's dormitory.
- Daigo (大圄)
  Voiced by: Junji Majima (Japanese); Eric Vale (English)
  Daigo is Kazari Uiharu and Ruiko Saten's teacher, whom the Tokiwadai Dorm Supervisor has shown her affection. He facilitates the transfer of Erī Haru'ue to Kazari's dormitory. Daigo is also a volunteer caretaker for Child Errors in Asunaro Park, where he falls in love with its principal named Kazuko Shigenomori.

==== Ryōran Maid School ====
- Maika Tsuchimikado (土御門 舞夏)
  Voiced by: Misato Fukuen (Japanese); Lara Woodhull (English)
  Maika Tsuchimikado is Motoharu's stepsister after being adopted by him from an orphanage outside Academy City before his infiltration. She is always seen wearing a maid attire and sitting atop a cleaning robot that keeps on spinning, but she shows no signs of dizziness. Maika has a friendly relationship with Toma Kamijo and Index and is also friends with Mikoto Misaka and Kuroko Shirai as she does maid-related work in Tokiwadai Middle School. Maika lives in her school dormitory but usually stays in her stepbrother's room to serve him like cooking his meals. She likes to read books about an older brother falling in love with his younger sister. Maika is later cursed by Aleister Crowley as she and Motoharu attempt to escape the city after the latter's fatal shooting of the Board Chairman, leading them to infiltrate the Windowless Building along with Toma, Index, and Othinus for a cure. She is last seen in Tahiti along with her stepbrother.
- Maria Kumokawa (雲川 鞠亜)
  Maria Kumokawa is Seria's younger sister and Maika Tsuchimikado's classmate. She is a Level 2 esper with an ability called "Violence Doughnut" (暴風車軸(バイオレンスドーナツ), Baiorensu Dōnatsu; lit. "Windstorm Axle") which allows her to increase her centrifugal force by 0.5 to 2 times. Maria is formally introduced in the fourth volume of A Certain Magical Index: New Testament when she arrives in Baggage City to find her missing teacher Kagun Kihara. She later joins Toma Kamijo, Index, Mikoto Misaka, and Leivinia Birdway during the GREMLIN invasion of Tokyo to deal with Kagun.

==== Sekisho Middle School ====
- Miho Jūfuku (重福 省帆)
  Voiced by: Yukari Tamura (Japanese); Leah Clark (English)
  Miho Jūfuku is a second-year student. She is a Level 2 esper with an ability called "Dummy Check" (視覚阻害(ダミーチェック), Damī Chekku; lit. "Visual Inhibition") which allows her to become invisible to other people's views, except for secondary sources (like mirrors) and technologies (like security cameras). Miho is ashamed of her thick eyebrows hidden by her bangs that cover almost her left eye. Her boyfriend ends his relationship with her because of her weird eyebrows and falls in love with a student from Tokiwadai Middle School, causing her grudge against Tokiwadai students. Miho uses the Level Upper to enhance her ability and begins her revenge by attacking them with a stun gun and drawing large eyebrows on them with a special marker. She later begins showing affection to Ruiko Saten by writing letters for her after being complimented by her for her eyebrows.

==== Other unnamed schools ====
- Mī Konori (固法 美偉)
  Voiced by: Kana Ueda (Japanese); Trina Nishimura (English)
  Mī Konori is a high school student and branch chief of Judgment 177 Branch Office, where Kazari Uiharu and Kuroko Shirai work. She is a Level 3 esper with an ability called "Clairvoyance" (透視系能力(クレアボイアンス), Kureaboiansu; lit. "See-through Ability") which allows her to use X-ray vision for finding concealed weapons. Mī is a former member of Big Spider, which she considers her haven, and shows affection towards its founder Wataru Kurozuma. His presumed death leads to her enlistment in Judgment.
- Tsuzuri Tessō (鉄装 綴里)
  Voiced by: Aya Endō (Japanese); Kara Edwards (English)
  Tsuzuri Tessō is a teacher and member of Anti-Skill, who often partners with Aiho Yomikawa. She has wavy, green hair that she ties in a ponytail and wears eyeglasses. Tsuzuri shows clumsiness at work, which results in her being reprimanded by Aiho. She is a fan of the arcade beat 'em up game titled Gekisho. Tsuzuri makes her light novel debut in the fifth volume of A Certain Magical Index: Genesis Testament as an Anti-Skill negotiator with the criminals belonging to Academy City's dark side. Once a timid person, her personality changes significantly following the failure of Operation Handcuffs, as she now has black hair and wearing a black jacket and tight skirt with types of equipment used to get the large animals in nature parks and circuses to obey as her weapons.
- Gunha Sogīta (削板 軍覇)
  Voiced by: Kengo Kawanishi (Japanese); Matt Shipman (English)
  Gunha Sogīta is a high school student and the strongest Gemstone esper. He is Academy City's seventh powerful Level 5 esper with an unknown ability yet demonstrates a range of skills such as Attack Crash (念動砲弾(アタッククラッシュ), Atakku Kurasshu; lit. "Telekinesis Cannonball"), which is capable of unleashing a blow powerful enough to destroy a mass of rubble, and Aurora Guard (磁力戦線(オーロラガード), Ōrora Gādo; lit. "Magnetism Front"), which is capable of leveling electricity attacks. Gunha is seen wearing a white headband and his signature Rising Sun T-shirt, which is replaced by a white T-shirt in the anime adaptation of the character. He is introduced in A Certain Magical Index SS2 when he saves a student named Yabumi Haratani from a group of Skill-Out. He later rebukes Ollerus for being gutless after the defeat of Misaka 10032 and other Sisters from the latter. During the Daihasei Festival, Gunha and Toma Kamijo work together to save an unstable Mikoto Misaka from becoming a Level 6. In A Certain Magical Index: New Testament, Gunha is present during the riot of "heroes" in the Learning Core and becomes concerned about the burning of trees caused by their actions. When Toma sides with Othinus against the whole world, he receives an email with orders to kill them but ignores it as he finds it gutless.
- Fremea Seivelun (フレメア=セイヴェルン, Furemea Seivuerun)
  Voiced by: Yui Ogura
  Fremea Seivelun is an eight-year-old elementary school student and Frenda's younger sister. Her ipso facto ability is called "Agitate Halation" (人的資源(アジテートハレーション), Ajitēto Harēshon; lit. "Human Resources") in which she is capable of influencing AIM diffusion fields to manipulate "heroes" and make them protect her at all cost, becoming a damsel in distress. Fremea officially debuts in the first volume of A Certain Magical Index: New Testament when she becomes a target of an organization called "Freshmen". She is later rescued by Toma Kamijo, Accelerator, and Shiage Hamazura, who becomes her guardian until Beetle 05 takes over.
- Kakeru Kamisato (上里 翔流)
  Voiced by: Yoshitsugu Matsuoka
  Kakeru Kamisato is a "normal high school boy" who originally lived in an ordinary town outside Academy City and the leader of the Kamisato Faction consisting of over 100 girls that he rescued before. He has an ability residing in his right hand called "World Rejecter" (理想送り(ワールドリジェクター), Wārudo Rijekutā; lit. "Ideal Exile") in which it is capable of banishing individuals with conflicting desires to a "new world". He arrives in Academy City to seek revenge against Magic Gods responsible for receiving this ability and finds Toma Kamijo whom he can share his circumstances with. Kakeru debuts in the fourteenth volume of A Certain Magical Index: New Testament when he meets Toma and Othinus doing grocery shopping. Their meeting is interrupted by fighting between the Birdway sisters over their resolution on the Sample Shoggoth infection. He later enrolls in an unnamed high school that Toma's class uses as a temporary facility due to their school's destruction at the hands of Magic God High Priest. Kakeru is later banished to the "new world" after Yuītsu Kihara severed his right hand and uses it against him. He is eventually rescued by Toma, Fran Karasuma, and Luca, and reunites with his faction as they prepare to leave the city.

=== Skill-Out ===
- Ritoku Komaba (駒場 利徳)
  Voiced by: Kenta Miyake (Japanese); Patrick Seitz (English)
  Ritoku Komoba is the leader of Skill-Out in District 7 and the guardian of Fremea Seivelun before his death at the hands of Accelerator. He is well-known for his gorilla-like appearance and wears a black leather jacket. He is generally an honorable person as he encourages his fellow Skill-Outs to not engage in prostitution as a source of money and violently attack espers, except for those who actively misuses their powers. Ritoku devises a plan to target espers on his hit list by disabling Academy City's communication network because of an increased number of esper's unreasonable attacks against Level 0s. This catches the attention of the Board of Directors, who then tasks GROUP to eliminate him and his Skill-Out operation.
- Hanzō Hattori (服部 半蔵)
  Voiced by: Yōhei Azakami
  Hanzō Hattori is the current leader of Skill-Out and a ninja descendant. During the uprising of different dark side organizations in Academy City, he saves Shiage Hamazura from being beaten by a group of thugs and hands him over a gun. Hanzō later meets him again after the latter defeated Shizuri Mugino in a plant refinery facility using that gun and invites him back to Skill-Out as their rightful leader. In the first volume of A Certain Magical Index: New Testament, he takes over Ritoku Komaba's role as Fremea Seivelun's guardian and protects her against Freshmen's attacks.
- Wataru Kurozuma (黒妻 綿流)
  Voiced by: Katsuyuki Konishi (Japanese); Brad Hawkins (English)
  Wataru Kurozuma is an anime-only character introduced in the first season of A Certain Scientific Railgun anime series as the founder of a Skill-Out faction called "Big Spider". He is well-known for his large spider tattoo on his back's right side hidden by his black leather jacket, and always seen carrying and drinking Musashino Milk. Wataru is presumed dead for two years after trying to save Tsuguo Hebitani, but he is later revealed to be alive and has been incarcerated for that time. Upon his release, he discovers that his group is now a ruthless gang and plans to dissolve it.
- Tsuguo Hebitani (蛇谷 次雄)
  Voiced by: Makoto Yasumura (Japanese); Jeremy Inman (English)
  Tsuguo Hebitani is the last leader of Big Spider before its disbandment. He takes over Wataru Kurozuma's name and role after his presumed death, and allows Big Spider to stock up weapons and attack innocent people, straying from the ways of the group's original incarnation. Tsuguo also acquires a machine that is capable of disrupting espers' powers called "Capacity Down".

=== Sisters ===
- Misaka 9982 (ミサカ9982号)
  Voiced by: Nozomi Sasaki (Japanese); Brittney Karbowski (English)
  Misaka 9982 is the 9,982nd clone of Sisters and the first clone that Mikoto Misaka meets. She shows curiosity toward the outside world as she walks around the city, which leads her to run into Mikoto. Upon meeting her, Misaka 9982 acts snarky in front of Mikoto but later bonds with her and receives a Gekota badge from her. Their first meeting is the last one as she is killed by Accelerator in the experiment while holding on to the very first gift she received.
- Misaka 10032 (ミサカ10032号)
  Voiced by: Nozomi Sasaki (Japanese); Brittney Karbowski (English)
  Misaka 10032 is the 10,032nd clone of Sisters and the most prominent clone to appear in the series. She is the second clone that Toma Kamijo meets, whom he calls Misaka Imōto (御坂妹; lit. "Misaka's little sister"), and has moments with him since then. She has soft spot for cats as she can pet a black kitten despite emitting EM waves from her body, which scares off them. During the experiment involving the Sisters clones, Misaka 10032 is the latest clone targeted by Accelerator for his experiment, but their fight is interrupted by Toma. She then provides him assistance in defeating Accelerator after reflecting on his words about self-worth. After the termination of the Level 6 Shift Project, Misaka 10032 becomes one of the 10 clones remaining in Academy City for body readjustment. She begins showing her feelings towards Toma and later receives a heart-shaped necklace from him to differentiate her from Mikoto Misaka, which she greatly treasures.
- Misaka 20001 (ミサカ20001号) / Last Order (ラストオーダー, Rasuto Ōdā)
  Voiced by: Rina Hidaka (Japanese); Brittney Karbowski (English)
  Last Order is the 20,001st clone of Sisters and administrator of the Misaka Network. Her name is written as "Uchidome" (打ち止め), meaning "The End", because she is designed as the fail-safe for the clones in the event they lose control. Her composition is different from other clones because she appears as a 10-year-old girl and shows emotions that she intercepts from Shinobu Nunotaba's installation of the emotion program throughout the network. She speaks the same way as her older clones but mentions "Misaka" twice instead. In the light novel series, Last Order follows Accelerator as he goes back to his apartment. She is infected by a virus installed by Ao Amai but is later saved by Accelerator. She and Accelerator are discharged from Heaven Canceller's hospital and are placed under Aiho Yomikawa's care. After playing tag with Misaka 10032 over her goggles, Last Order is abducted by Amata Kihara and is installed with another virus to activate Hyōka Kazakiri's angel mode. She later falls ill after Aiwass manifested in front of GROUP. Accelerator and Last Order then arrive in Russia to find Index for a cure she previously used during Vento of the Front's attack in Academy City.
- Misaka Worst (ミサカワースト, Misaka Wāsuto)
  Voiced by: Ai Kakuma (Japanese); Brittney Karbowski (English)
  Misaka Worst is the only clone produced by the Third Season Project who is ordered by Academy City to kill Last Order in Russia. Her name is written as "Bangai Kotai" (番外個体), meaning "Extra Individual". Her ability is similar to the previous generation of Mikoto Misaka's clones but is ranked as Level 4. Misaka Worst's appearance is slightly an older version of Mikoto with a dark personality. During World War III, she becomes Accelerator's ally after their first meeting in Russia. In A Certain Magical Index: New Testament, Misaka Worst starts to live in Aiho Yomikawa's apartment and is seen wearing an áo dài given by Kikyō Yoshikawa.
- Dolly (ドリー, Dorī)
  Voiced by: Konomi Kohara (Japanese); Brittney Karbowski (English)
  Dolly is the prototype for Mikoto Misaka's clones before their mass production. She befriends Mitori Kōzaku and Misaki Shokuhō in the building that holds both the Clone Dolly Project and Exterior Project, but their bonding is interrupted by her sudden death. They reunite by the end of the Daihasei Festival when Misaki learns that Dolly's original body is the only one that died and her memories are transferred into a new clone body.

=== Board of Directors ===
- Aleister Crowley (アレイスター・クロウリー, Areisutā Kurourī)
  Voiced by: Toshihiko Seki (original), Kaori Mizuhashi (young girl) (Japanese); Chuck Huber (English)
  Aleister Crowley is a magician, based on the real-life occultist of the same name, and the founder of Academy City after leaving the world of magic. He resides in the Windowless Building and is confined upside down inside a life-support tube created by Heaven Canceller. As the Board Chairman, he has the final say on the city's internal affairs but usually leaves the citizen's welfare to the twelve board directors. Aleister is considered the greatest magician in history, where more than half of all modern sorcerers are affected by his established theories and two-fifths of them are direct followers of his ways. He has his primary combat spell called "Spiritual Tripping" (霊的蹴たぐり, Reiteki Ketaguri) which allows a connection between him and the target to manifest illusionary weapons in their mind, resulting in having the same effects as the real one, and possesses a magic staff as his signature weapon called "Blasting Rod" (衝撃の杖(ブラスティングロッド), Burasutingu Roddo; lit. "Cane of Impact") in which it can amplify a magic's effect ten times from what the target assumes. Aleister's backstory is introduced in the eighteenth volume of A Certain Magical Index: New Testament when he becomes a member of the Golden Dawn magic cabal, and his membership there leads to his hatred towards magic and the eventual establishment of the science side.
- Monaka Oyafune (親船 最中)
  Voiced by: Mika Doi (Japanese); Linda Young (English)
  Monaka Oyafune is a member of the Board of Directors and Suama's mother. She is possibly the only board director who shows affection towards Academy City's students, unlike the other members that only see them as experiment subjects. Monaka seeks Toma Kamijo's help in ending the worldwide anti-Academy City protests and later gets shot by Motoharu Tsuchimikado as a means of covering up her illicit meeting with him. During the uprising of different dark side organizations in the city, she becomes the target of the assassination attempt orchestrated by SCHOOL.
- Thomas Platinaburg (トマス・プラチナバーグ, Tomasu Purachinabāgu)
  Voiced by: Yūya Murakami (Japanese); Randy Pearlman (English)
  Thomas Platinaburg is a member of the Board of Directors and the financier for ITEM. During the attack of Vento of the Front in Academy City, he is gravely injured by Accelerator who seeks revenge against the higher management responsible for kidnapping Last Order. Thomas later hires Stephanie to kill Accelerator but is killed by her instead when he mentions using Chimitsu Sunazara as a bargaining chip.
- Shiokishi (潮岸)
  Voiced by: Ryōsuke Kanemoto (Japanese); Doug Jackson (English)
  Shiokishi is a member of the Board of Directors who oversees military research, development, and production. He is always seen wearing a HsPS-15 Powered Suit because he feels uneasy without it. Shiokishi attempts to eliminate GROUP for their investigation of DRAGON, but his plan is thwarted by the efforts of the team and Monaka Oyafune. He later loses consciousness when Aiwass manifests in front of him and GROUP during their failed negotiation.
- Rizō Nakimoto (亡本 裏蔵)
  Voiced by: Hinata Tadokoro (Japanese); Brian Mathis (English)
  Rizō Nakimoto is a member of the Board of Directors and the financier for Disciplinary Action (DA) and Scavenger. He manages Academy City's food supply, including the farm buildings, and contributes to the city's defensive forces to protect its infrastructure. Rizō is introduced as an antagonist in A Certain Scientific Accelerator franchise.
- Tsugutoshi Kaizumi (貝積 継敏, Kaizumi Tsugutoshi)
  Tsugutoshi Kaizumi is a member of the Board of Directors whom Seria Kumokawa works for as his advisor. He is instrumental in rescuing Gemstones from around the world and bringing them inside Academy City, but he fails to cease the Agitate Halation Project until Toma Kamijo intervenes.
- Hisako Yakumi (薬味 久子)
  Hisako Yakumi is a member of the Board of Directors and an expert in the medical field. She is brainwashed by Yuītsu Kihara to have the same intellectual curiosity as hers, leading her to develop the Agitate Halation Project for the latter to enter the realm of Hyōka Kazakiri, Aiwass, and beyond. Hisako disguises the project under the pretext of purging the "heroes" who become a nuisance in Academy City and begins observing Fremea Seivelun as the "protection target" that will "agitate" the heroes in killing each other to protect her at all cost. She becomes an AIM-thought being with the help of the fluid mechanics-based computer called "Shading Computer" and later gets destroyed by Toma Kamijo's Imagine Breaker. Hisako's remaining existence is manifested using the scent emitted by the man-eating cockroaches, but her status is left unknown after Fräulein Kreutune ate 99% of her form.
- Norito Neoka (根丘則斗)
  Norito Neoka is a member of the Board of Directors and a former rescue squad elite. He is introduced in the first volume of A Certain Magical Index: Genesis Testament when he instructs Hoshimi Madono to abduct Last Order so that he can use her as a bargaining chip against the new Board Chairman Accelerator's plan of eliminating the Academy City's dark side.

=== Kihara family ===
- Therestina Kihara Lifeline (テレスティーナ・木原・ライフライン, Teresutīna Kihara Raifurain)
  Voiced by: Sayaka Ohara (Japanese); Colleen Clinkenbeard (English)
  Therestina Kihara Lifeline is Gensei's granddaughter, whom he uses as his first test subject for his research on Body Crystals, and the leader of Academy City's SAR unit called "Multi Active Rescue" (MAR). She is seen carrying a cylindrical tube of candies that she uses for her guessing games with others and is well-known for her exclusive pink-camouflaged HsPS-15 Powered Suit. Therestina leads MAR in investigating Poltergeist-related incidents along with Anti-Skill and Judgment. She later tricks Mikoto Misaka and Harumi Kiyama into allowing her to take the latter's comatose students under her custody for her actual goal of using them as test subjects for the Body Crystals experiment that will make Erī Haru'ue a Level 6 esper. Her plan is foiled by Mikoto and her friends, and she is later arrested by Anti-Skill.
- Amata Kihara (木原 数多)
  Voiced by: Keiji Fujiwara (Japanese); Marcus D. Stimac (English)
  Amata Kihara is a researcher assigned as the mentor for Accelerator and the commander of the black ops unit called "Hound Dog". He has a tattoo on the left side of his face and wears mechanical gloves. During the attack of Vento of the Front in Academy City, Amata is reunited with Accelerator when Hound Dog is tasked to abduct Last Order. The two engage in a fight until Accelerator kills him with his manifested black wings to send him to the sky, turning him into a plasma in the process.
- Gensei Kihara (木原 幻生)
  Voiced by: Binbin Takaoka (Japanese); Charlie Campbell (English)
  Gensei Kihara is an elderly scientist specialized in neurology and the antagonist introduced in A Certain Scientific Railgun franchise. He is Harumi Kiyama's superior who conducts the inhumane experiment involving her Child Error students, resulting in their coma. His research on Body Crystals continues later in the series when he involves Mikoto Misaka in his experiment that will turn her into a Level 6 esper. However, his plan is thwarted by the efforts of Toma Kamijo, Misaki Shokuhō, Gunha Sogīta, Kuroko Shirai, Kazari Uiharu, and Ruiko Saten. His current status is unknown after being defeated by Misaki inside the Exterior building.
- Nayuta Kihara (木原 那由他)
  Nayuta Kihara is introduced in A Certain Vending Machine's Proof of Existence mini-novel by Ryōgo Narita as Gensei's granddaughter and a member of Judgment 49 Branch Office. She is a cyborg despite looking like an ordinary elementary school girl because her grandfather experiments on her, and an esper with an ability that allows her to see and feel the flow of AIM diffusion fields. Nayuta is one of the Kiharas who care for Child Errors as she is friends with Harumi Kiyama's students and donates her earned money from experiments she participated in to Child Error facilities, including Asunaro Park.
- Kagun Kihara (木原 加群)
  Kagun Kihara is a scientist specializing in NDE-related research and a magician of GREMLIN going under the name Bersi. He is seen wearing a white coat and helmet to hide his appearance. Kagun resigns from being a researcher after questioning the morality of his experiments and becomes a teacher instead. However, he decides to quit teaching for almost three years after killing a young man who attacks a group of his students, including Maria Kumokawa. In Baggage City, Kagun dies after successfully killing Byōri Kihara, who is responsible for the corruption of the young man, thus completing his revenge on her.
- Yuītsu Kihara (木原 唯一)
  Voiced by: Mai Nakahara
  Yuītsu Kihara is the negotiator sent to Baggage City by Academy City to deal with the Science Guardian and a researcher responsible for influencing Hisako Yakumi in developing the Agitate Halation Project. She is always seen taking care of Nōkan Kihara, whom she addresses as "Sensei". Yuītsu has a grudge against Kakeru Kamisato after learning about his involvement in Nōkan's death, causing the citywide Elements attacks in Academy City. Her fate becomes unknown when her controlled Kamisato Faction turned against her after Toma Kamijo, Fran Karasuma, and Luca rescued Kakeru from his banishment.
- Nōkan Kihara (木原 脳幹)
  Voiced by: Show Hayami
  Nōkan Kihara is a Golden Retriever and the wielder of the anti-magic machine called "Anti-Art Attachment". He is seen wearing a collar and backpack installed with robotic arms for him to be able to smoke Cuban cigars. Nōkan has an understanding of magic due to his ties with Aleister Crowley. After his apparent death from the encounter with Kakeru Kamisato, he is revived by Heaven Canceller, whom he accompanies to Egypt for their mission to create a body for Aleister's daughter Lillith.

=== Dark side organizations ===
==== SCHOOL ====
- Kaibi Gokusai (獄彩 海美)
  Voiced by: Shiori Izawa (Japanese); Marti Etheridge (English)
  Kaibi Gokusai is one of the operatives of SCHOOL known as the Girl in the Dress. She is an esper with an ability called "Heart Measure" (心理定規(メジャーハート), Mejā Hāto; lit. "Mind Ruler", "Measure Heart") which allows her to regulate the distance between people's hearts, making her relationship with the target affectionate or distant. Kaibi participates in enjo kōsai but clarifies that she only accompanies her clients without sexual involvement. During the uprising of the dark side organizations in Academy City, she chases Shiage Hamazura after he was left behind by Shizuri Mugino and Rikō Takitsubo to pursue Teitoku Kakine but loses track of him. She finds Frenda Seivelun instead and brings her to Teitoku for interrogation. Kaibi later becomes a member of a new team formed from the remnants of dissolved dark side organizations. She leads the remaining Hound Dogs to hunt down Shiage upon the orders of Aleister Crowley. Kaibi returns in the third volume of A Certain Magical Index: Genesis Testament when she reunites with an imprisoned Shiage after voluntarily surrendering in an Anti-Skill station because she finds the place safer while Anti-Skill commences Operation Handcuffs against the members of the city's dark side.
- Banka Yobō (誉望 万化)
  Voiced by: Yūya Hirose
  Banka Yobō is an operative of SCHOOL known for his moniker Boy with Goggles (ゴーグルの少年, Gōguru no Shōnen). He is a Level 4 esper with an ability similar to psychokinesis. He is always seen wearing a ring-shaped metallic headgear with extended wires on its outer edge. During the uprising of several dark side organizations in Academy City, Banka is killed by Shizuri Mugino during their confrontation in Elementary Particle Engineering Laboratory.
- Chimitsu Sunazara (砂皿 緻密)
  Voiced by: Tarō Kiuchi (Japanese); Phil Parsons (English)
  Chimitsu Sunazara is a sniper of SCHOOL and Stephanie Gorgeouspalace's close friend. He is known for using a magnetic sniper rifle produced by Academy City called "MSR-001". During the uprising of several dark side organizations in Academy City, Chimitsu is hired by SCHOOL as their replacement for their previous dead sniper (Rakko Yumiya) and tasked to assassinate Monaka Oyafune. He later joins Teitoku Kakine and Kaibi Gokusai in infiltrating ITEM's hideout, where he provides sniping support. Chimitsu's sniping location is destroyed by Saiai Kinuhata's handheld anti-tank missile warhead. He is later revealed to be alive after surviving the blast but is in a coma since then.
- Rakko Yumiya (弓箭 猟虎)
  Voiced by: Sayumi Suzushiro (Japanese); Emi Lo (English)
  Rakko Yumiya is a sniper of SCHOOL and a student of Shidarezakura Academy. Her sniping method includes hiding two collapsible sniper rifles inside her uniform's sleeves and using her nose to smell the target's blood drip and follow their trail. Rakko targets Frenda Seivelun and Ruiko Saten for the latter's purchased Indian Poker card that might contain information about the Tweezers. However, she is defeated by Frenda and her mouth is blown up by her bombs. Rakko is later revealed to have survived with the help of Banka Yobō and is seen wearing a prosthetic mouth. She vows to take revenge on Frenda but is already taken out by ITEM before the uprising of several dark side organizations in Academy City.

==== ITEM ====
- Shizuri Mugino (麦野 沈利)
  Voiced by: Ami Koshimizu (Japanese); Lydia Mackay (English)
  Shizuri Mugino is the leader of ITEM. She is Academy City's fourth most powerful Level 5 esper with an ability called "Meltdowner" (原子崩し(メルトダウナー), Merutodaunā; lit. "Atom Breaker") which allows her to convert electrons into an unstable destructive matter for her to fire high-speed beams of light and make an energy shield. Shizuri is capable of showing kindness to her teammates and protecting them from the dangers they got involved in, but she usually looks down upon low-level espers and does not mind eliminating people who got in her way, regardless of whether they are an ally or enemy. Shizuri and her team are hired to defend the remaining facilities involved in the Level 6 Shift Project from Mikoto Misaka's attacks. She arrives in time just as Mikoto interrogates Frenda Seivelun. The two Level 5 espers engage in a fight until Shizuri is defeated by Mikoto with the help of Frenda's leftover explosive items. During the uprising of several dark side organizations in the city, Shizuri and her team discuss the recent assassination attempt on Monaka Oyafune. She deduces that SCHOOL uses this event as a diversion for their actual goal. Shizuri receives a call from their team's liaison and is tasked to deal with the Virus Isolation Center's hacking, but she informs her that she plans to destroy SCHOOL instead. Shizuri and her team arrive at the Elementary Particle Engineering Laboratory, where she kills Banka Yobō and confronted Teitoku Kakine. She then gives chase to a fleeing Teitoku, who successfully steals the Tweezers, but loses track of him. Shizuri is later attacked by him inside ITEM's hideout. A defeated Shizuri kills Frenda for revealing the team's lair to SCHOOL. As she drags Frenda's bloody upper body, a vengeful Shizuri demands Shiage Hamazura to hand over Rikō Takitsubo to track Teitoku by her power. She then fights him for stealing the Body Crystals needed for enabling Rikō's power until she loses her right eye and left arm and gets shot by him. Shizuri survives the predicament and receives treatment with the help of Dark Legacy. She then confronts Shiage for the second time in District 23's airport but is still defeated by him. Due to trauma and psychological breakdown, she develops a disturbing sense of twisted love for him and declares castrating him as a sign of affection before letting him and Riko escape Academy City via a supersonic passenger plane. During World War III, Shizuri intercepts Shiage in Russia and overdoses herself with Body Crystals as she feels like being defeated by him for the third time. She finally reconciles with him and Rikō after being moved by Shiage's words about how he wanted the old Shizuri who cares for her teammates to be back. In A Certain Magical Index: New Testament, Shizuri reforms ITEM and restores her relationship with other remaining members.
- Rikō Takitsubo (滝壺 理后)
  Voiced by: Aya Suzaki (Japanese); Megan Shipman (English)
  Rikō Takitsubo is an operative of ITEM and Shiage Hamazura's girlfriend. She is a Level 4 esper with an ability called "AIM Stalker" (能力追跡(AIMストーカー), AIM Sutōkā; lit. "Ability Tracker") which allows her to record espers' AIM diffusion fields for her to track their location. Her ability requires Body Crystals for its activation, which prevents her from becoming Academy City's eighth most powerful Level 5 esper. Rikō is always seen wearing a pink tracksuit that serves as her casual wear and sleepwear. During the uprising of several dark side organizations in the city, Rikō becomes the target of SCHOOL because they see her as a threat to their plans. She pushes Shiage inside an elevator to save him from Teitoku Kakine's attack but suffers damage to her body as she uses her ability against him. She is found unconscious by a returning Shiage and brought to Aiho Yomikawa for safety as he lures Shizuri Mugino away from her. During World War III, Rikō and Shiage arrive in Russia where she receives partial treatment from Elizalinan magicians. Her ability is further revealed by the arrival of ITEM's liaison to have the potential in altering an esper's Personal Reality, which can change their power level or give a non-powered esper an ability. In A Certain Magical Index: New Testament, Rikō becomes a member of the reformed ITEM and reunites with Shizuri, while her relationship with Shiage improves as they go on date and take care of Fremea Seivelun like a parent. During the Ichihanaran Festival, her ability helps one of the White Beetles to become free of Teitoku's control and take over him as the new one.
- Saiai Kinuhata (絹旗 最愛)
  Voiced by: Chinatsu Akasaki (Japanese); Apphia Yu (English)
  Saiai Kinuhata is an operative of ITEM and a test subject of the Dark May Project. She is a Level 4 esper with an ability called "Offense Armor" (窒素装甲(オフェンスアーマー), Ofensu Āmā; lit. "Nitrogen Armor") which allows her to automatically create a nitrogen-made barrier around her body. She is known for adding "super" (超, chou) in her sentences and loves watching B or C movies. Saiai subdues Shinobu Nunotaba as the latter attempts to install an emotion program throughout the Misaka Network. During the uprising of several dark side organizations in Academy City, she helps Shiage Hamazura and Rikō Takitsubo to escape SCHOOL's attack in their hideout and destroys Chimitsu Sunazara's sniping position with her handheld anti-tank missile warhead, but she is later knocked down by Teitoku Kakine. Saiai becomes a target of revenge by Stephanie Gorgeouspalace for her role in Chimitsu's condition. She manages to defeat her with the help of a reserved liquid nitrogen canister. In A Certain Magical Index: New Testament, Saiai becomes a member of the reformed ITEM and reunites with Shizuri Mugino.
- Frenda Seivelun (フレンダ セイヴェルン, Furenda Seivuerun)
  Voiced by: Maaya Uchida (Japanese); Leah Clark (English)
  Frenda Seivelun is an operative of ITEM and Fremea's older sister. She is the only member of the team capable of defeating opponents without any esper ability as she uses explosive items like dolls stuffed with bombs and explosive tapes, and hand-to-hand combat. Frenda is Norwegian and loves to eat mackerel because it reminds her of her hometown. Frenda fights Mikoto Misaka inside one of the facilities she is tasked to protect from her infiltration, but she is later defeated. During the uprising of several dark side organizations in Academy City, she is captured by SCHOOL and forced to reveal the location of ITEM's hideout with the help of Kaibi Gokusai's ability. Frenda is later killed by Shizuri Mugino for her betrayal. Before this event, she becomes friends with Ruiko Saten for their love of mackerel and gets invited by her over dinner, but she is already dead by the time their scheduled dinner arrives. In A Certain Magical Index: New Testament, Frenda's grave is visited by Shizuri at District 10.

==== MEMBER ====
- Professor (博士, Hakase)
  Voiced by: Ryō Sugisaki (Japanese); Ben Bryant (English)
  The Professor is the unnamed elderly leader of MEMBER. He equips Mimosa, a weapon containing microscopic-sized reflective alloy capable of decomposing organic matter. He loves numerical expressions and finds beauty within them. He is aware of the existence of magic because one of his teammates (Xochitl) is a magician. During the uprising of several dark side organizations in Academy City, the Professor is killed by Teitoku when he confronts him over the stolen Tweezers.
- Yoshio Baba (馬場 芳郎)
  Voiced by: Daichi Hayashi (Japanese); Dallas Reid (English)
  Yoshio Baba is an operative of MEMBER specialized in hacking and surveillance. He supports the Professor by using animal-shaped robots while inside an emergency shelter. He has a keen insight into his opponent's esper power and uses it to his advantage in fighting them. In A Certain Scientific Railgun franchise, Yoshio attempts to obtain one of the Sisters (Misaka 10032), but his plan is thwarted by Mitsuko Kongō, Kinuho Wannai, Ma'aya Awatsuki, and Mikoto Misaka. During the uprising of several dark side organizations in Academy City, he watches the defeat of the Professor and Saraku on-screen, and later gets trapped inside the shelter as the outside area is being flooded.
- Saraku (査楽)
  Voiced by: Daisuke Takahashi (Japanese); Alejandro Saab (English)
  Saraku is an operative of MEMBER. He is a Level 3 esper with an ability dubbed by Accelerator as "Kill Point" (死角移動(キルポイント), Kiru Pointo; lit. "Blind-spot Movement") in which he uses an individual as a reference point for his teleportation, teleporting himself behind the target. During the uprising of several dark side organizations in Academy City, Saraku is defeated by Accelerator as he protects District 23's parabolic antenna. In A Certain Scientific Railgun franchise, he meets Pierce Aogami and praises his S-ranked Indian Poker cards.

==== BLOCK ====
- Tatsuhiko Saku (佐久 辰彦)
  Voiced by: Ken Mizukoshi (Japanese); Chris Rager (English)
  Tatsuhiko Saku is the leader of BLOCK. He plans on bringing 5,000 foreign mercenaries inside Academy City to lead them in his attack against Aleister Crowley, whom he has hatred. During the uprising of several dark side organizations in the city, Tatsuhiko is rendered unconscious by Megumi Teshio after the two debated over his treatment of hostages inside District 10's Reformatory.
- Megumi Teshio (手塩 恵未)
  Voiced by: Chitose Morinaga (Japanese); Jeannie Tirado (English)
  Megumi Teshio is an operative of BLOCK who previously works as an officer of Anti-Skill. She joins the team to learn if Aleister Crowley has control over the children's fate on the dark side as she sympathizes with them. During the uprising of several dark side organizations in Academy City, she is defeated by Awaki Musujime inside District 10's Reformatory after the latter overcame her trauma of using her ability.
- Yamate (山手)
  Yamate is an operative of BLOCK. He is part of the squad that infiltrates the Management's apartment to prevent leakage of the SCHOOL's plan. Yamate is later killed by Etzali who then uses his appearance as his disguise to infiltrate the team.
- Tetsumō (鉄網)
  Voiced by: Tomoko Tsuzuki (Japanese); Sarah Wiedenheft (English)
  Tetsumō is an operative of BLOCK. She is an esper with an ability called "Skill Polygraph" (意見解析(スキルポリグラフ), Sukiru Porigurafu; lit. "Comment Analysis") which allows verification of the target's profile while holding their hands. During the uprising of several dark side organizations in Academy City, Tetsumō followed the rest of the members of BLOCK, but she was caught at the helicopter attack which has been caused by Etzali's magic in order to escape from BLOCK.

==== Scavenger ====
- Rita Īzumi (飯棲 リタ) / Leader (リーダー, Rīdā)
  Voiced by: Akane Fujita (Japanese); Felecia Angelle (English)
  Rita Īzumi is the leader of Scavenger. She is a Level 3 esper with an ability called "Predator" (鳥瞰把握(プレダター), Puredatā; lit. "Bird's-eye Grasp") which allows dispersion of eye-like shapes throughout the sky by covering her one eye to locate the target regardless of their distance. Rita is always seen wearing a surgical mask with dark, crossed hands printed on it.
- Itsuki Yakumaru (薬丸 医月)
  Voiced by: Nozomi Nishida (Japanese); Julie Shields (English)
  Itsuki Yakumaru is an operative of Scavenger. She is an esper with an ability called "Mix Master" (液比転換(ミックスマスター), Mikkusu Masutā; lit. "Liquid Ratio Conversion") which allows her to separate and mix liquids by manipulating their specific gravity.
- Naruha Sakuragi (作楽木 ナルハ)
  Voiced by: Aoi Koga (Japanese); Sarah Wiedenheft (English)
  Naruha Sakuragi is an operative of Scavenger. She is a Level 3 esper with an ability called "Perfect Paper" (浸紙念力(パーフェクトペーパー), Pāfekuto Pēpā; lit. "Immersed Paper Psychokinesis") which allows her to manipulate papers into various forms and shapes. Naruha is known for being childish among the team and unconcerned about exposing her body, except for her private parts that are covered with small pieces of paper, during the fight.
- Tarōmaru Seike (清ヶ 太郞丸)
  Voiced by: Yuka Nukui (Japanese); Rachel Glass (English)
  Tarōmaru Seike is an operative of Scavenger known for being the only male on the team. He is an esper with an ability called "Stick Slip" (摩擦増減(スティックスリップ), Sutikku Surippu; lit. "Friction Fluctuation") which allows him to control frictional coefficients within a meter of himself. Tarōmaru is always seen wearing seifuku and has a tattoo of a skull with horns and chains.

==== Freshmen ====
- Umidori Kuroyoru (黒夜 海鳥)
  Voiced by: Anzu Haruno
  Umidori Kuroyoru is an operative of Freshmen and a test subject of the Dark May Project. She is a cyborg and Level 4 esper with an ability called "Bomber Lance" (窒素爆槍(ボンバーランス), Bombā Ransu; lit. "Nitrogen Bomb Lance") which allows her to produce nitrogen-made spears from her hands. She is always seen wearing gothic lolita clothes with a white coat hanging on her head.

=== Others ===
- Heaven Canceller (ヘヴンキャンセラー, Hevun Kyanserā)
  Voiced by: Yutaka Nakano (Japanese); Cole Brown (Index I, Index II, Railgun, Railgun S, Endymion), Bill Brooks (Index III, Accelerator) (English)
  Heaven Canceller is a doctor in District 7's hospital known as The Frog-faced Doctor by Toma Kamijo and others. His name is written as "Meido Gaeshi" (冥土帰し), meaning "Rescuer from the Other World", due to his ability to fully restore fatally injured patients from their brink of death. Heaven Canceller is an exceptionally gifted and benevolent physician as he can cure any illness and heal any injuries, but he cannot bring back the dead and is unable to fix brain-related injuries such as Toma's wiped memories and Accelerator's computation ability. He saves anyone's health, whether they are an ally or enemy, as he faithfully follows the Hippocratic Oath.
- Sphynx (スフィンクス, Sufinkusu)
  Voiced by: Kotarō
  Sphynx is Index's pet calico cat after she found it abandoned in a box. Toma Kamijo tries to prevent her from keeping the cat because his dormitory prohibits pets, but they still pull it off without anyone suspecting them.
- Tōya Kamijo (上条 刀夜)
  Voiced by: Kenji Nomura (Japanese); Christopher Sabat (English)
  Tōya Kamijo is Toma's father and a businessman who travels a lot and collects various good luck charms for his son with unnatural streak of bad luck. Though he may seem silly at times, Tōya does care about his wife and son. He is partly responsible for causing the Angel Fall spell, bringing a powerful angel from heaven to Earth without his knowing about it. He is a playboy in his youth but later falls in love with his future wife Shīna. Despite being happily married and having no interest in other women, he still manages to attract women, much to the chagrin of his wife.
- Shīna Kamijo (上条 詩菜)
  Voiced by: Kikuko Inoue (Japanese); Lydia Mackay (English)
  Shīna Kamijo is Toma's mother who has a gentle personality and cares about her son. She commonly uses the phrase "ara-ara". While she is usually seen as calm and sweet, she can be jealous if another woman is interested in her husband. Since the Daihasei Festival in Academy City, she has become good friends with Misuzu Misaka.
- Kikyō Yoshikawa (芳川 桔梗)
  Voiced by: Yumi Tōma (Japanese); Caitlin Glass (English)
  Kikyō Yoshikawa is a researcher for the Level 6 Shift Project and Aiho Yomikawa's close friend. She is the first adult who Accelerator trusts because she casually chats with him and cares for him. Kikyō remains inside the facility despite the end of the project as she investigates Last Order's escape from her life-support machine and the virus that Ao Amai installs in her. She gets shot by Ao but is later saved by Heaven Canceller. After being discharged from the hospital, Kikyō stays in Aiho's apartment and becomes the guardian of Accelerator and Last Order along with her. She reveals her desire to become a teacher since that is her plan even before becoming a researcher.
- Ao Amai (天井 亜雄)
  Voiced by: Tatsuhisa Suzuki (Japanese); Kent Williams (English)
  Ao Amai is a researcher for the Radio Noise Project (or Sisters Project), where he specializes in creating personality data with self-learning capabilities, and later becomes involved in the Level 6 Shift Project. He later associates himself with an outside organization called "Science Association" to sell classified Academy City information as a means of repaying his large debts caused by the shutdown of the Level 6 Shift Project he heavily invests in. He is responsible for the virus installed in Last Order, which is capable of forcibly making her command Mikoto Misaka's clones to go on a rampage via the Misaka Network. Ao is killed by Kikyō Yoshikawa after shooting Accelerator in the head following the latter's interruption of the virus's activation.
- Misuzu Misaka (御坂 美鈴)
  Voiced by: Emi Shinohara (Japanese); Barrett Nash (English)
  Misuzu Misaka is Mikoto's mother who is currently studying in college. Due to her youthful looks, she is generally mistaken as Mikoto's older sister. She is aware that her daughter likes Toma Kamijo. Since the Daihasei Festival in Academy City, she has become good friends with Shīna Kamijo.
- Harumi Kiyama (木山 春生)
  Voiced by: Atsuko Tanaka (Japanese); Anastasia Muñoz (English)
  Harumi Kiyama is a teacher for the Child Errors and an AIM researcher who works for Gensei Kihara. She is well-known for her unashamed stripping in public as a result of being a researcher for years, earning her the alias Stripping Woman (脱ぎ女, Nugi Onna) by urban legends web forums. Harumi is introduced in A Certain Scientific Railgun franchise as the creator of Level Upper, an audio file designed for unlocking or enhancing esper powers. Because of this, she gains an ability called "Multi-Skill" (多才能力(マルチスキル), Maruchi Sukiru; lit. "Versatility Ability") which allows her to access multiple abilities from espers connected to the Level Upper network such as water manipulation, wind manipulation, teleportation, Synchrotron, ice creation, shock wave creation, beam slicing, and concrete cutting. She later loses control of the network during her fight with Mikoto Misaka, producing an AIM entity on his head called the "AIM Burst". Harumi later reveals her true intention of saving her former Child Error students that are being used in an inhumane experiment by Gensei. She is later arrested by Anti-Skill but vows to continue her research of finding a cure for them. Harumi is later bailed out by Heaven Canceller and continues working for a cure along with him. She later manages to save the students with the help of Mikoto and her friends.
- Arisa Meigo (鳴護 アリサ)
  Voiced by: Sachika Misawa (Japanese); Megan Shipman (English)
  Arisa Meigo is the main heroine of A Certain Magical Index: The Movie – The Miracle of Endymion known for being a talented singer. She is a Level 0 esper yet has caused miracles to happen through singing. Arisa meets Toma Kamijo and Index and tells them about her audition to become the mascot of the space elevator Endymion. She is later targeted by Stiyl Magnus, who warns about her becoming the cause of a war between the magic and science sides. Arisa attracts Shutaura Sequenzia's interest for an unknown reason until the latter reveals that she is her alter ego, who gets separated from her during the Orion spaceplane incident. By the end of the film, Arisa and Shutaura merge back while their whereabouts are unknown.
- Shutaura Sequenzia (シャットアウラ=セクウェンツィア, Shattoaura Sekuuentsuia)
  Voiced by: Yoko Hikasa (Japanese); Whitney Rodgers (English)
  Shutaura Sequenzia is an original character introduced in A Certain Magical Index: The Movie – The Miracle of Endymion and the leader of a private security organization called "Black Crow Unit". She is a Level 4 esper with an ability called "Earth Palette" (希土拡張(アースパレット), Āsu Paretto; lit. "Rare Earth Expansion") which allows her to store rare-earth elements and release them as explosive energies. Shutaura is one of the 88 survivors of the spaceplane Orion crash where she loses her ability to discern music, resulting in her hearing them as static instead. She also becomes hateful of people who use the word "miracle" because they only highlight the survivors dubbed as "Miracle 88" without honoring the death of her father, the 89th passenger, caused by Academy City's release of the repudiated incident report to the public. At the end of the film, Shutaura merges back with Arisa after Toma Kamijo used his Imagine Breaker on her.
- Febri (フェブリ, Feburi)
  Voiced by: Iori Nomizu (Japanese); Kara Edwards (English)
  Febri is an original anime character introduced in A Certain Scientific Railgun S. She has a child-like innocence and has an interest in Gekota when she persuades Mikoto Misaka to hand over her pink Gekota finger puppet. Febri is friendly with Mikoto's friends, except Mikoto herself, but later begins to like her in the series. She is later revealed to be a Chemicaloid, an artificial human created by STUDY using Shinobu Nunotaba's Testament. Her body produces a poison that requires her to eat special lollipops made of neutralizing compounds to stay alive. After dealing with STUDY, Febri and her twin named Janie are flown outside Academy City to have their bodies readjusted.
- Mitsuko Kongō's father (婚后光子の父親, Kongō Mitsuko no Chichioya)
  Voiced by: Shinji Kawada
  He is the unnamed father of Mitsuko and Tabigake Misaka's friend who currently leads the Kongō Airlines. He assists Mikoto Misaka and her friends in their fight against STUDY by sending a large robot called "Ekaterina II S" upon the request of his daughter.
- Seigo Hōjō (北条 静護)
  Seigo Hōjō is introduced in A Certain Scientific Railgun: Astral Buddy as a doctor in Heaven Canceller's hospital and a researcher assigned in Clone Dolly Project's third laboratory called "Ideal". He loses his senses of pain and taste along with his emotions after getting possessed by an uncontrollable AIM aggregation during his tenure in the Ideal lab.
- Stephanie Gorgeouspalace (ステファニー=ゴージャスパレス, Sutefanī Gōjasuparesu)
  Voiced by: M·A·O
  Stephanie Gorgeouspalace is a mercenary and close friend of Chimitsu Sunazara. She is seen wearing an urban camouflage jacket over her green shirt and goggles, appearing overall as more of an actress than a hitman. Stephanie's style of eliminating targets is through the use of powerful explosives instead of the long-distance sniping that Chimitsu usually does. She kills Thomas Platinaburg instead of her assigned target (Accelerator) after hearing his plan of using Chimitsu as a bargaining chip against her. Stephanie then fights Saiai Kinuhata in an underground mall as she robs her control of nitrogen around the area, but Saiai manages to defeat her with the help of a reserved liquid nitrogen canister. She returns in the seventh volume of A Certain Magical Index: New Testament when she is taken out of prison and coerced to work with Anti-Skill. Stephanie and Aiho Yomikawa are partnered to deal with fluid mechanics expert Dr. Matsusada as he tries to leave Academy City illegally via airplane at District 23.
- Mikihiko Hishigata (菱形幹比古)
  Voiced by: Ryōta Ōsaka (Japanese); Adam Gibbs (English)
  Mikihiko Hishigata is a neuroscientist introduced in A Certain Scientific Accelerator franchise as the inventor of the machine capable of housing a deceased esper called "Coffins". He affiliates himself with Disciplinary Action for his agenda. Mikihiko is often seen with a lollipop in his mouth and has verbal tic, sometimes ending his sentences with "yeah" (うん, un).
- Keitz Nokleben (カイツ=ノックレーベン, Kaitsu Nokkurēben)
  Voiced by: Kazuyoshi Hayashi (Japanese); Mark Stoddard (English)
  Keitz Noklebem is a researcher assigned as the security supervisor for the Level 6 Shift Project. His name is originally unknown in A Certain Scientific Railgun manga series until the release of its anime adaptation. He learns about Mikoto Misaka's attacks at research facilities involved in the project. Since the shutdown of the project, Keitz becomes Misaki Shokuhō's informant and secures Misaka 10032 inside the Exterior building for protection against the organizations interested in the Sisters clones.
- Rensa #28 (恋査 #28)
  Rensa #28 is the 28th designated operator of the Rensa cyborg and Hisako Yakumi's assistant in her hospital. She is seen wearing a purple cardigan over her pink nurse attire. Rensa #28 has an odd habit of nicknaming patients and hospital rooms.
- Etsu Aihana (藍花 悦)
  Etsu Aihana is the mysterious Academy City's sixth most powerful Level 5 esper. His ability allows an individual to receive power from his name and make it their "ideal self". His personal information and identity are currently unknown. In A Certain Magical Index: New Testament, Etsu officially debuts during the incident involving Magic God Othinus when he silently toys with his phone after receiving an email with instructions to kill Toma Kamijo and the Magic God. After the attack in Dianoid, he speaks over the phone to Skill-Out member Yokosuka about his plan of helping other people by lending his name. In A Certain Magical Index: Genesis Testament, Etsu appears in front of Toma inside a hospital and offers his name to gain power for his fight against Anna Sprengel.
- Tabikake Misaka (御坂 旅掛)
  Tabikake Misaka is Mikoto's father who is a rich and prominent businessman. He meets Tōya Kamijo during a business trip in one of the side-story chapters. He has been employed to find and correct flaws in the world and is currently investigating Gemstone espers to prevent them from falling into the hands of governments and agencies unaffiliated with Academy City. Tabikake has numerous connections worldwide and access to Aleister Crowley, whom he does not hesitate to threaten when he suspects that he might use his wife and daughter in his plans.
- Mina Mathers (ミナ=メイザース, Mina Meizāsu)
  Voiced by: Chiwa Saitō
  Mina Mathers is a thought entity reproduced by the question-and-answer type thought-assisted artificial intelligence created by Aleister Crowley called "Reading Thoth 78", who resembles the deceased wife of the Golden Dawn magic cabal founder Samuel Liddell MacGregor Mathers. She is seen wearing a mourning black dress and has black cat ears and a tail. Mina is introduced as a guide for Toma Kamijo during his infiltration of the Windowless Building, during which she reveals to him the history behind Aleister.

== Magic side ==
=== British royal family ===
- Elizard (エリザード, Erizādo)
  Voiced by: Yōko Sōmi (Japanese); Casey Casper (English)
  Elizard is the current queen regnant of the United Kingdom. She is the wielder of a ceremonial sword called "Curtana Second" that allowed her to receive empowerment from Archangel Michael's angelic power.
- Riméa (リメエア, Rimēa)
  Voiced by: Mari Hino (Japanese); Katelyn Barr (English)
  Riméa is the eldest daughter of Elizard and the first princess of the British royal family. She has shoulder-length black hair and wears a monocle on her left eye. While she is notably very intelligent, Riméa is extremely cautious and does not trust anyone who identified her as a princess. Before the events of the English revolution called the "British Halloween", Riméa does not join Carissa in investigating the bombing of Eurotunnel and likely hides in London or a nearby city. She later observes afar the battle that took place in Buckingham Palace and learns about Carissa's true plans. She then uses a communication spell to plead to the people present in the palace to save Carissa. Riméa returns in the New Testament: A Certain Magical Index light novel series during Crowley's Hazards' invasion of London. Riméa and the rest of the British royal family (except Carissa) get evacuated from London to refuge in Scotland via royal carriages. She brandishes the Curtana Lost towards Samuel Liddell as he attacks the convoy. In the Kamijō story arc, Riméa assists Tōma in infiltrating Windsor Castle as he confronts his doppelganger there.
- Carissa (キャーリサ, Kyārisa)
  Voiced by: Kei Shindō (Japanese); Dawn M. Bennett (English)
  Carissa is the second daughter of Elizard and the second princess of the British royal family. She is always seen wearing a red dress with added arm-length red gloves and a golden crown. Carissa possesses an impressive understanding of military strategy and tactics. In the British Royal Family story arc, she stages a coup d'état along with the Knights of England against the monarchy to shift the power balance away from the growing influence of the Roman Catholic Church throughout Europe. She is later defeated by Tōma and her Curtana Original gets destroyed. In the World War III story arc, Carissa leads the British military forces in Dover Strait against the Maiden of Versailles and her French forces. She later works with her to fight the sudden appearance of Archangel Gabriel but the two struggle to defeat the angel until Carissa forces it to retreat by ordering multiple surface-to-air missiles towards the Star of Bethlehem. In the New Testament: A Certain Magical Index light novel series, Carissa voluntarily imprisons herself in the Tower of London for her role in the British Halloween but she is temporarily freed to aid the United Kingdom and its allies in defeating GREMLIN. She later arrives in Denmark to capture Tōma and attack Othinus when he suddenly allied himself with the Magic God. During Crowley's Hazards' invasion of London, Carissa remains imprisoned in the Tower of London and gives Orsola advice about how she will determine if a prisoner disguises themselves as one of the prison guards.
- Villian (ヴィリアン, Virian)
  Voiced by: Sayaka Harada (Japanese); Emily Fajardo (English)
  Villian is the youngest daughter of Elizard and the third princess of the British royal family. She is a timid but benevolent young woman, causing her to become the public face of the royal family and be used in political marriages. In the British Royal Family story arc, Villian becomes upset about Carrisa's plan of using military forces to solve the country's crisis. She gets captured by her and is about to get beheaded when Acqua showed up and saved her. She later joins Tōma and Index in their mission to overload the Curtana Original so that they could begin their counter-attack against Carissa. In the New Testament: A Certain Magical Index light novel series, Villian is present during the chaos in Windsor Castle and meets Accelerator, who recently defeated Elizard, to secure her mother.

=== Necessarius ===
- Laura Stuart (ローラ=スチュアート, Rōra Suchuāto)
  Voiced by: Ayako Kawasumi (Japanese); Carli Mosier (English)
  Laura Stuart serves as an Archbishop of Canterbury and a leader of Necessarius. She appears as an eighteen-year-old girl but her age and appearance are the same as twenty years ago when Matthai first met her. She is known for her long, blonde hair that weighed 2.5 times her weight and reached her ankles, and is seen wearing a beige robe. Laura speaks funny Japanese because of how Motoharu taught her. Despite being an archbishop, her personality gets described by Stiyl as cold and calculating due to the number of good and evil deeds she had done being equal. In the New Testament: A Certain Magical Index light novel series, Laura reveals herself as possessed by a great demon named Coronzon.
- Stiyl Magnus (ステイル=マグヌス, Suteiru Magunusu)
  Voiced by: Kishō Taniyama (Japanese); Robert McCollum (English)
  Stiyl is a tall, red-haired magician and priest of Necessarius. His sorcery name is Fortis931, "I prove why my name is the strongest here" (我が名が最強である理由をここに証明する, Waga Na ga Saikyō de aru Riyū o Koko ni Shōmei suru), and magic skills base on runes and fire magic, which included summoning a fiery creature called "Innocentius" (魔女狩りの王 (イノケンティウス), Majogari no Ō (Inokentiusu); lit. "King of Witch Hunters"). Stiyl is known for wearing a black priest robe and has a barcode tattoo under his right eye. He has short temper but he shows kindness as he cares for Index's welfare and promises to protect her at all cost. Stiyl debuts in the first volume of A Certain Magical Index light novel series when he attempted to retrieve and reset Index's memories but his mission gets foiled by Tōma. He later learns how Necessarius lied to him about Index's condition and helps Tōma to subdue Index while in her John's Pen mode. In the Deep Blood story arc, Stiyl becomes the representative of the Church of England in Academy City to deal with Aurelous and his abduction of Aisa. In the Orsola Aquinas story arc, he receives information from Laura about the stolen Book of the Law. Stiyl, Tōma, and Index join Agnese Forces to rescue Orsola from Amakusas but he later fights the Roman Catholic battle nuns when their plan got revealed. In the Daihasei Festival story arc, Stiyl works with Tōma and Motoharu to stop Oriana and Lidvia from using Croce di Pietro to subjugate Academy City under Roman Orthodox Church. In the Document of Constantine story arc, he interrogates prisoners Lidvia and Biagio in the Tower of London for information about God's Right Seat. In the British Royal Family story arc, Stiyl receives an order from Laura to handle the Sky Bus 365 terrorist incident. He then boards a Royal Air Force transport plane and reaches the hijacked plane to help Tōma subdue the terrorist. At the end of the British Halloween, Stiyl becomes enraged with Laura as she uses a spare controller for Index after Fiamma activated her John's Pen mode using an external controller. In the World War III story arc, he attempts to restrain Index that gone berserk.
- Kaori Kanzaki (神裂 火織, Kanzaki Kaori)
  Voiced by: Shizuka Itō (Japanese); Morgan Garrett (English)
  Kaori is an eighteen-year-old Japanese sorceress from Necessarius. Unlike her partner Stiyl, she uses magic to magically strengthen her body. Her sorcery name is Salvare000, "Be the salvation of those who cannot be saved" (救われぬ者に救いの手を, Sukuwarenu Mono ni Sukui no Te o). She uses a two-meter-long nodachi called "Seven Heavens Seven Swords" as her weapon. She has a special attack called Nanasen (七閃; "Seven Flash") that uses her sword and some wires. She is to be a kind woman who treats Index like a sister, but when Index's memories are erased by Necessarius, Kaori becomes a ruthless and silent woman as Index is unable to remember her and consequently distrusts her. After Tōma rescues Index and her current memories, she decides to let Index stay at Academy City as she feels Tōma can protect her. Later in the novels, more of her past is revealed. Not only is Kaori a skilled swordswoman, but she is a Catholic Saint possessing the "Stigma" — the ability to call upon God's power — and the former leader of the Amakusa Catholics; however, Kaori leaves the group as she resents that she has been fated since birth to become its leader, which leads to her resenting the concept of luck and fortune. Though she is Catholic, she joins Necessarius in hopes of changing her fate and befriended Index, developing a sisterly relationship with her. The repeated failed attempts to make Index remember her after each memory erasure results in Kaori beginning to accept that no matter how much a person tries, no one can change their destiny. However, Kaori begins to show a kinder side to herself after Tōma rescues Index, giving her hope that anyone can defy their destiny, and eventually falls in love with him after he helps her reunite with the Amakusa Catholics, becoming more prone to showing emotion and sometimes showing a little embarrassment if she is with him. She is the protagonist of her spin-off mini-light novel bundled with the A Certain Scientific Railgun DVDs.
- Sherry Cromwell (シェリー=クロムウェル, Sherī Kuromuweru)
  Voiced by: Akeno Watanabe (Japanese); Stephanie Young (English)

Sherry is a member of Necessarius and the head of the Royal Academy of Arts. Her sorcery name is Intimus115, "I offer everything to my lost friend" (我が身の全ては亡き友のために, Waga mi no subete wa naki tomo no tame ni) and magic skills base on Kabbalah idols, which used chalk or oil pastel to summon a golem named Golem Ellis (ゴーレム=エリス, Gōremu Erisu). She is known for her dark skin and blonde hair and is seen wearing a black gothic lolita dress. Sherry is introduced as the antagonist in the sixth volume of A Certain Magical Index light novel series when she infiltrated Academy City intending to attack a person of importance to either Academy City or Necessarius as a means of sparking a war between the science and magic side. During her fight with Tōma, Sherry reveals the reason behind her attack is because of a past experiment conducted by the Church of England and Academy City to create a magician-esper hybrid, which resulted in the death of her friend esper named Ellis. She is later defeated by Tōma. In the Daihasei Festival story arc, Sherry is placed under house arrest by the archbishop and becomes an unlikely friend of Orsola as they search for information about Croce di Pietro in the British Library. In the Acqua of the Back story arc, she gives a lecture about heraldry in the Royal Academy of Arts when she received a call from Orsola regarding Acqua's history. Her knowledge about armorial bearings helps to unveil Acqua's identity as William Orwell. In the British Royal Family story arc, an out-of-control Sherry begins to attack the Knights of England by summoning Golem Ellis but she later calms down after Oriana helped her regain her senses. She then assists Tōma and Kaori in their fight against Carissa at Buckingham Palace. Sherry returns in the New Testament: A Certain Magical Index light novel series when she contacted Kaori regarding the plan to intercept Radiosonde Castle. In the Magic God Othinus story arc, she works with Orsola in the British Library to provide information and analysis for the Anti-GREMLIN Alliance and the invading force sent to attack GREMLIN's base in Sargasso located near Iceland.

- Orsola Aquinas (オルソラ=アクィナス, Orusora Akwinasu)
  Voiced by: Aya Endō (Japanese); Mallorie Rodak (English)
  Orsola is a former Roman Orthodox nun who resided in Chioggia, Italy. She specializes in preaching the gospel to pagan countries and in decoding written codes. Her contribution to the preaching of Christianity earns her a church named after her in Japan. Orsola becomes a target of the Roman Orthodox Church after they found her alleged skill in decoding The Book of the Law dangerous. In the Orsola Aquinas story arc, she gets rescued by Tōma and his friends for being persecuted by Agnese Forces. In the Daihasei Festival story arc, Orsola works with Sherry to gather details about Croce di Pietro and contacts Tōma and Motoharu to share her information about the artifact. In The Queen of the Adriatic Sea story arc, she invites Tōma and Index in her house at Chioggia as she prepares to move to London. Orsola and Tōma accidentally board a Queen's Fleet ship where she found Agnese. She then helps in the rescue of her from the hands of Biagio. In the Acqua of the Back story arc, Orsola is in the British Library to find information about Acqua and decides to call Sherry for help. She later calls Saiji to rely on the information she gathered about Acqua. During the British Halloween, Orsola meets Tōma with an injured Lessar and as she treats her wounds, she tells him to head towards Waterloo station for him to use the Eurostar line that would bring him to Folkestone where Index was. In the New Testament: A Certain Magical Index light novel series, Orsola feels helpless during Crowley's Hazards' invasion of London and offers herself to wield a Divine Mixture spiritual item called "Isis-Demeter". She begins to attack Tōma but she gets saved by him after his words about the benefits of a non-violent approach were properly conveyed to her. Orsola is last seen in the Kamijō story arc when she joined the party at Windsor Castle for their victory over Coronzon and appeared drunk.
- Oriana Thomson (オリアナ=トムソン, Oriana Tomuson)
  Voiced by: Ryoka Yuzuki (Japanese); Jennifer Green (English)
  Oriana is a blonde English magician who served as a devout Roman Orthodox nun before becoming a mercenary. Her sorcery name is Basis104, "The one who carries the basis." (礎を担いし者, Ishizue o Ninaishi Mono). She uses her version of a grimoire called Shorthand (速記原典 (ショートハンド), Sokki Genten (Shōtohando); lit. "Shorthand Original") that mixed in symbols and four elements from Western magic. Her physical appearance is that of beauty with a rather attractive figure, which made most women around her jealous. In the Daihasei Festival story arc, Oriana is hired by Lidvia for a special mission to take over Academy City. She is later captured by Necessarius but she makes a deal with them to investigate the source of the Eurotunnel explosion.
- Marie Spearhead (メアリエ=スピアヘッド, Mearie Supiaheddo)
  Voiced by: Asami Seto (Japanese); Maeghan Albach (English)
  Marie is an original character introduced in A Certain Magical Index: The Movie – The Miracle of Endymion as a witch of the Church of England who specialized in water-based magic.
- Mallybath Blackball (マリーベート=ブラックボール, Marībēto Burakkubōru)
  Voiced by: Megumi Han (Japanese); Haley Esposito (English)
  Mallybath is an original character introduced in A Certain Magical Index: The Movie – The Miracle of Endymion as a witch of the Church of England who specialized in earth-based magic.
- Jane Elves (ジェーン=エルブス, Jēn Erubusu)
  Voiced by: Risa Taneda (Japanese); Sarah Wiedenheft (English)
  Jane is an original character introduced in A Certain Magical Index: The Movie – The Miracle of Endymion as a witch of the Church of England who specialized in wind-based magic.
- Smartvery (スマートヴェリー, Sumātoverī)
  Voiced by: Nana Hamasaki (Japanese); Katlin Moon-Jones (English)
  Smartvery is a witch of the Church of England stationed in a mobile fortress called "Coven Compass". She leads the attack of witches against the Knights of England near the island of Islay in the Atlantic Ocean during the British Halloween.
- Theodosia Electra (テオドシア=エレクトラ, Teodoshia Erekutora)
  Theodosia is a member of Necessarius who specialized in Norse-based magic. She receives an order from Necessarius to eliminate Patricia but she discovers that the target was innocent as she does not know magic. Theodosia then protects her against Richard who manipulated the mission Necessarius tasked to her.
- Jeans Shop Owner (ジーンズ店主, Jīnzu Tenshu)

He is the unnamed owner of a small jeans store in London and an unofficial member of Necessarius. He usually partners with Kanzaki Kaori in various missions.

- Richard Brave (リチャード=ブレイブ, Richādo Bureibu)
  Richard is a magician and former member of Necessarius. During his tenure in the organization, Richard contributes to setting up a defensive line along the Atlantic Ocean to prevent American magic cabals from infiltrating the United Kingdom. He creates his signature spell called "Lævateinn" (破滅の枝 (レーヴァテイン), Hametsu no Eda (Rēvatein); lit. "Twig of Destruction") that used a Western sword with runic engravings on it to unleash flames capable of burning anything. His spell classifies as illegal by Necessarius as it includes some scientific elements instead of pure magic, causing his hatred of them. He plots on capturing Patricia because of the Rune Epitaph that Leivinia gave to her but he gets defeated by Stiyl and Theodosia along with Leivinia's Dawn-colored Sunlight operatives.

=== Amakusa Church ===
- Saiji Tatemiya (建宮 斎字, Tatemiya Saiji)
  Voiced by: Kōsuke Toriumi (Japanese); Duncan Brannan (English)
  The substitute-Supreme Pontiff of the Amakusa Catholics, who saves people for the sake of saving them rather than for any ulterior motive. A capable leader, he strives to rebuild the group so that Kaori, who left the group and rejected the position of Pontiff to protect them from any incidents that would occur as a result of her status as a Saint, would feel welcome to return to them someday. He has impressionable pitch-black hair and a unique sense of fashion, which includes an over-sized shirt and one-meter long shoelaces. Saiji is an expert in Amakusa-style combat and is equipped with a 180-centimeter-long Flamberge.
- Itsuwa (五和, Itsuwa)
  Voiced by: Ai Kayano (Japanese); Krishna Smitha (Season 2), Amanda Lee (Season 3) (English)
  An Amakusa girl. Originally introduced in the eleventh novel, she makes an earlier appearance in the anime episode "The Book of the Law" which is based on the beginning of the 7th novel. In the 11th novel, she fell in love with Tōma after their first meeting, claiming it was love at first sight but the anime suggests she fell for him much earlier during the Orsola incident in the seventh novel. However, due to her shyness, she is unable to properly tell him how she feels. Yet she hopes to get Tōma's attention, even when knowing her senpai and superior Kaori is also in love with him. She has accompanied Tōma and his friends on more than one occasion, including traveling with him to Italy, France, and Britain. In the events of the 16th novel, she becomes his bodyguard and caretaker. When Acqua first attacks Academy City, she fails to protect him and tries to heal Tōma with magic but unsuccessfully due to his Imagine Breaker. After Tōma is sent to the hospital she goes into despair for failing to protect him but Saiji rebukes her and tells her to snap out of it as she focuses on fighting with Acqua if she wants to protect him. During the Amakusas' rematch against Acqua, Itsuwa suddenly displays a change of personality, becomes full of tranquil fury that even the way she spoke changed. She performed a "Saint Destroyer" spell in that battle, harming Acqua and causing him to lose the "Divine Mother's Mercy" spell which allows them to defeat him. Her weapon is a Friulian Spear, which by adding layers of reinforcement magic, turns it into a symbol of a 'Thousand Years Tree', which symbolizes the growth of plants and makes certain magic spells to be more potent over time. She also can perform Nanasen (七閃; "Seven Flash") by manipulating her spear and steel wires just like Kaori.

=== Knights of England ===
- Knight Leader (騎士団長, Kishidanchō; lit "Knight Grandmaster")
  Voiced by: Takehito Koyasu (Japanese); David Matranga (English)
  The Knight Leader is the title held by the current unnamed leader of the Knights of England. He is a skilled swordsman equipped with a dark-red sword called "Hrunting" and his defensive spell is known as Spell of Thororm (ソーロルムの術式, Sōrorumu no Jutsushiki; lit. Thororm's Technique Formula) that allowed him to turn any magical or scientific weapons' offensive value into zero. He has shown interest in Kaori as he courts her and brings a bouquet for her so that he could invite her to a ball. In the British Royal Family story arc, the Knight Leader and the rest of the Knights of England side with Carissa as she stages a coup d'état against the monarchy. He later defeats Kaori in Folkestone due to the power boost given to him by Carissa's Curtana Original. As he prepares to behead a captured villain, the Knight Leader gets confronted by Acqua, who suddenly arrived and interrupted the execution, and gets defeated by his mercenary tactics. He later joins the resistance force in the battle at Buckingham Palace to stop Carissa. In the New Testament: A Certain Magical Index light novel series, the Knight Leader is not incarcerated for his role in the British Halloween and does not show a willingness to voluntarily imprison himself due to unknown circumstances that he needed to solve first. He becomes part of the invasion force sent to attack GREMLIN's base in Sargasso. After he survived the bombard of Sargasso, the Knight Leader joins Kaori, Carissa, and Acqua in Denmark to capture Tōma and attack Othinus. In the Coronzon story arc, he works with Kaori to fight Aleister (in his girl form) after he entered London when the last barrier of England-Londinium Fortress fell.
- Holegres Mirates (ホレグレス=ミレーツ, Horeguresu Mirētsu)
  Holegres is a member of the Knights of England tasked to defend London during Crowley's Hazards' invasion of the United Kingdom. He appears as a fat middle-aged British noble who took pride in his nobility but he lacks chivalry. In the Coronzon story arc, Holegres is found hiding in St. James Palace by Accelerator and gets interrogated atop Nelson's Column for being absent during the battle and using others as sacrificial pawns. He is later sent flying into the side of Elizabeth Tower. In the Kamijō story arc, Holegres reunites with Accelerator and redeems himself in front of him for being present and handling the chaos in Windsor Castle.

=== Magic cabals ===
==== New Light ====
- Lessar (レッサー, Ressā)
  Voiced by: Yūki Takada (Japanese); Brittany Lauda (English)
  Lessar is the most prominent member of New Light in A Certain Magical Index light novel series and its sequel. Her spiritual accessory is a dragon-like tail under her skirt, which allowed her to balance herself mid-air. Lessar shows patriotism to the United Kingdom and she does whatever is necessary to make Tōma work with New Light for the country's sake, like seducing him. In the British Royal Family story arc, Lessar gets chased by Tōma and Oriana, who both cornered her afterward. She later gets wounded by a shot using a magical arrow called "Robin Hood". A wounded Lessar reveals to them that New Light got hired to excavate Curtana Original and deliver it to Carissa. Lessar receives treatment from Orsola when Tōma carried her in the women's dormitory of Necessarius. In the World War III story arc, Lessar accompanies Tōma in Russia and attempts to seduce him throughout their journey. She helps Sasha in disrupting Fiamma's control over the Star of Bethlehem and tells Tōma to leave the place as soon as possible before she escapes. In New Testament: A Certain Magical Index light novel series, Lessar receives intel about Tōma's return to Academy City with the help of Leivinia. She becomes irritated because her seducing efforts get wasted and tells Lancis to take over in charming Tōma. In the Magic God Othinus story arc, Lessar and Leivinia visit Tōma's dormitory to seek his Imagine Breaker in destroying Gungnir. Near the end of the story arc, Lessar witnesses afar Tōma and Othinus' conclusion of their journey in Denmark, where the Magic God would later become a 15-centimeter fairy. In the Coronzon story arc, Lessar and Leivinia receive instruction to transport a Divine Mixture spiritual item called "Wadjet-Leto" to the British Museum. She is last seen in Genesis Testament: A Certain Magical Index light novel series when she investigated the sudden rise of R&C Occultics along with Leivinia.
- Bayloupe (ベイロープ, Beirōpu)
  Voiced by: Natsumi Fujiwara (Japanese); Michelle Rojas (English)
  Bayloupe is the leader of New Light and the eldest among the group. Her spiritual accessory is hearing-aid-like devices behind her ears with two vacuum-tube-like objects sticking from each one called "Gjallarhorn", which allowed her to incorporate its wisdom in her Steel Glove so that she could partially use the thunder attribute of Thor. In the British Royal Family story arc, Bayloupe subdues Itsuwa in an underground railway station platform but she later gets defeated by her when she succumbed to the traps in the tunnel that turned out as an off-limit Necessarius facility.
- Floris (フロリス, Furorisu)
  Voiced by: Minori Suzuki (Japanese); Morgan Berry (English)
  Floris is a member of New Light. Her spiritual accessory is small dragon-like wings at her back, which helped her to offset her falling speed. In the British Royal Family story arc, a captured Floris gets saved by Tōma inside a train as he sneaks in it to reach Folkestone but they alert the onboard Knights of England. Floris saves him with her wings after the two jumped out of the train to escape the guards and they end up floating on a nearby river, where they got found by an Amakusa Catholic scout. She becomes enraged at Tōma because she thinks that he brought her back to the Amakusas who defeated her earlier. This event has caused Floris to have a grudge against Tōma since then.
- Lancis (ランシス, Ranshisu)
  Voiced by: Rui Tanabe (Japanese); Kristen McGuire (English)
  Lancis is a member of New Light. Her spiritual accessory is dragon-like claws wore on her fingers. She has a strange magic condition that gave her a tickling sensation when she used magic power. In the British Royal Family story arc, Lancis holds the suitcase that contained Curtana Original and positions herself 30 km north of London. As her comrades get captured, she successfully delivers the artifact to Knight Leader.

==== Dawn-colored Sunlight ====
- Leivinia Birdway (レイヴィニア バードウェイ, Reivinia Bādowei)
  Voiced by: Yō Taichi (Japanese); Ariel Graham (English)
  Leivinia is a twelve-year-old, blonde-haired leader of Dawn-colored Sunlight and Patricia's older sister. Her sorcery name is Regnum771 that meant "kingdom" in Latin. She uses a magical wooden wand called "Wand of Swords and Cups" (剣と杯の杖, Ken to Hai no Tsue) that allowed her to cast magic based on the four elements and a full set card of Major Arcana that helped to boost her parameters and make a supersonic movement. Her actions and personality are described as merciless, unreasonable, and overwhelming. In the British Royal Family story arc, Leivinia advises Mark to not get involved during British Halloween despite their chance to analyze Curtana. In the World War III story arc, she saves Tōma from the Arctic Ocean after he defeated Fiamma. Leivinia majorly debuts in the New Testament: A Certain Magical Index light novel series when she brought Tōma back to Academy City and introduced Accelerator and Shiage to the world of magic. In the Hawaii Invasion story arc, she recruits the three along with Mikoto, Misaka Worst, and Umidori to draw out core members of GREMLIN by infiltrating Hawaii and making the 27 Cooperative Institutions of Academy City break off with Academy City due to her teammate's connection with the city once they save the island state. In the Ichihanaran Festival story arc, Leivinia works with Ollerus and arrives in Academy City to foil GREMLIN's plan of capturing Fräulein. She faces Tōma, who felt a grudge on her due to her betrayal of them back in Hawaii, but she becomes horrified when he got shot by Anti-Skill. Leivinia later fights Tōma and gets defeated by him. As she leaves Academy City, Leivinia gets teased by Silvia for her feeling of being like a little sister getting scolded by her big brother. In the Magic God Othinus story arc, she arrives in Tōma's dormitory along with Lessar to recruit him in destroying Gungnir. Leivinia later fights Tōma on Little Belt Bridge in Denmark when he suddenly sided with Othinus but she comes to an understanding with him of his reason behind saving the Magic God. In the World Rejecter story arc, she studies African cannibalization to use it for her sister that got infected by Sample Shoggoth. In the Coronzon story arc, Leivinia works with Lessar to deliver a Divine Mixture spiritual item called "Wadjet-Leto" to the British Museum. She is last seen in the Genesis Testament: A Certain Magical Index light novel series when she investigated the sudden rise of R&C Occultics along with Lessar.
- Mark Space (マーク=スペース, Māku Supēsu)

Mark is Leivinia's loyal personal assistant and member of Dawn-colored Sunlight. His sorcery name is Armare091 and he specializes in using Minor Arcana tarot cards to perform elemental spells.

=== Roman Orthodox Church ===
- Matthai Reese (マタイ=リース, Matai Rīsu)
  Voiced by: Masafumi Kimura (Japanese); Bob Magruder (Seasons 1-2), Jim White (Season 3) (English)
  Matthai serves as a Pope of the Roman Orthodox Church. When the magic world discovered the existence of Tōma and his right hand's power, he is convinced by Fiamma to declare him an enemy of the world and a heretic that must be eliminated. When he later learned about Fiamma's deception, Matthai is suddenly attacked by his powerful spell that could destroy Vatican City but he diverts the spell on himself to save the city. He is later hospitalized and manages to recover from his wounds. Matthai then quells the riot in Rome and takes back the church's leadership from the bishops who supported Fiamma. He is contacted by Vasilisa to work together in bringing down the Star of Bethlehem. He steps down from his position after World War III.
- Aureolus Izzard (アウレオルス=イザード, Aureorusu Izādo)
  Voiced by: Tomokazu Sugita (Japanese); Jason Liebrecht (English)
  Aureolus is an eighteen-year-old alchemist and a magician from the Roman Orthodox Church who betrayed the organization. His sorcery name is Honos628, "My honor is for the world" (我が名誉は世界のために, Waga Meiyo wa Sekai no Tame ni). Aurelous possesses a powerful form of alchemy called Ars Magna (黄金練成 (アルス=マグナ), Ōgon Rensei (Arusu Maguna); lit. "Golden Training") that allowed him to turn his thoughts into reality by uttering them in words. His ability is heavily reliant on his belief and state of mind; the more he doubts, the weaker his spell becomes until it does not activate at all. In the Deep Blood story arc, Aurelous reveals that he was Index's former partner three years ago and became devastated after he learned about the young nun's forceful erasure of her memory to save her life. He eventually works with Aisa to spare Index from yearly erasing her memories, and uses her powers to attract and catch a vampire so that he could use them as a method of transforming Index into a vampire, which would help her overcome her life expectancy. When he learned about Tōma's rescue of Index's life, Aurelous angrily makes everyone his enemy but he is stopped by Tōma using his Imagine Breaker against his power, which led to his madness. Out of pity, Aureolus' appearance is transformed by Stiyl so that the Roman Catholic Church could not capture and punish him.
- Lidvia Lorenzetti (リドヴィア=ロレンツェッティ, Ridovia Rorentsetti)
  Voiced by: Rei Sakuma (Japanese); Rachel Robinson (English)
  Lidvia is a Catholic nun and radical among the Roman Orthodox Church known as "Mardi Grass". She can convert people to Christianity regardless of their societal status: criminals, non-believers, or other magicians that shared no connection with the Roman Orthodox Church. In the Daihaisei Festival story arc, Lidvia attempts to convert Academy City's populace into Roman Orthodox using an artifact called Croce di Pietro but her plan gets thwarted by Tōma, Motoharu, and Stiyl, and she later gets captured by Necessarius. In the Document of Constantine story arc, she is being imprisoned in the Tower of London and gets interrogated by Stiyl for information about God's Right Seat.
- Biagio Busoni (ビアージオ=ブゾーニ, Biājio Busōni)
  Voiced by: Norio Wakamoto (Japanese); Barry Yandell (English)
  Biagio is a middle-aged bishop of the Roman Orthodox Church and a magician who specialized in cross-related powers. In The Queen of the Adriatic Sea story arc, he commands the mobilization of the Roman Orthodox Church's magical weapon called "The Queen of the Adriatic Sea" to annihilate Academy City after Lidvia failed her mission. His plan gets disrupted when Amakusa Catholics attacked the fleet and he is later defeated by Tōma. In the Document of Constantine story arc, Biagio is being imprisoned in the Tower of London and listens as Lidvia provides information to Stiyl about God's Right Seat.

=== Agnese Forces ===
- Agnese Sanctis (アニェーゼ=サンクティス, Anyēze Sankutisu)
  Voiced by: Rie Kugimiya (Japanese); Alex Moore (English)
  Agnese is the leader of the Agnese Forces. She wields a staff called "Lotus Wand" that could inflict any damage to her opponent by damaging the staff as well. She has long red braided hair and wears chopine to compensate for her small stature. In the Orsola Aquinas Rescue story arc, Agnese and her forces help Necessarius in their search for Orsola and The Book of the Law grimoire. After Agnese Forces successfully rescued the missing Roman Orthodox nun, Agnese tortures Orsola while inside the Church of Orsola but gets defeated by Tōma. In The Queen of the Adriatic Sea story arc, Agnese boards The Queen of the Adriatic Sea's fleet to serve as a sacrificial pawn for the activation of the Rosary of the Appointed Time spell that would make the flagship destroy Academy City. She is later rescued by Orsola. Agnese then joins Necessarius but she tries to reconnect with the Roman Orthodox Church.
- Lucia (ルチア, Ruchia)
  Voiced by: Mariya Ise (Japanese); Lauren Landa (English)
  Lucia is a member of the Agnese Forces. She is a tall woman with long blonde hair and blue eyes. She has a serious nature and dislikes non-Catholics very much. Lucia uses a large carriage wheel called "Catherine Wheel", based on the legend of Saint Catherine of Alexandria, which could explode into pieces of shrapnel that injured her opponents and revert to its original form.
- Angelene (アンジェレネ, Anjerene)
  Voiced by: Azusa Kataoka (Japanese); Kristin Sutton (English)
  Angelene is a member of the Agnese Forces and Lucia's partner. She is slightly shorter than her partner with long honey-colored braided hair. She seems to be quite shy in contrast to her partner, though her personality at times can be childish, and she does get angry. She has a real sweet tooth for various desserts and sweet drinks. Her magic uses four bags of coins hanging around her waist, referencing Apostle Matthew's position as a tax collector, which could transform into four elements (air, earth, fire, and water) and launch them as projectiles to her opponents. In her childhood, Angelene is abandoned by her parents while in France but she is later taken into custody by the Roman Orthodox Church, where she became a nun-in-training.
- Agata (アガター, Agatā)
  Voiced by: Mai Fuchigami (Japanese); Leah Clark (English)
  Agata is a member of the Agnese Forces. She has blue eyes and long brown hair and is seen wearing eyeglasses. In The Queen of the Adriatic Sea story arc, Agata helms the 47th ice ship of the Queen's Fleet and reports to Biagio about the surprise attack conducted by Amakusa Catholics in their fleet. In the British Royal Family story arc, she helps the Agnese Forces in their investigation of New Light's hideout. Agata returns in the New Testament: A Certain Magical Index light novel series when she and some members of the Agnese Forces got picked up by Shiage with his pickup truck while fleeing from Crowley's Hazards.

=== God's Right Seat ===
- Vento of the Front (前方のヴェント, Zenpō no Vento)
  Voiced by: Akiko Hiramatsu (Japanese); Kara Edwards (English)
  Vento is a member of God's Right Seat blessed with the nature of "God's Flame" and aligned with Archangel Uriel. She uses a suppression spell called Divine Punishment (天罰術式, Tembatsu Jutsushiki; lit. Damnation Arts) that could render people with evil intentions against her unconscious and wields a barbed hammer that represented the hammer used to nail the Son of God. Her face is heavily pierced with heavy makeup over it. In her childhood, Vento visits an amusement park with her brother, who died in an accident inside the park; thus, she grows up with a deep hatred for science and technology. In the Academy City Invasion story arc, she invades Academy City and causes havoc to kill Tōma, but she fails due to the intervention of Hyōka (in Fuse Kazakiri mode) and later gets defeated by Tōma. Vento later returns during World War III to hunt down Fiamma for betraying Vatican City.
- Terra of the Left (左方のテッラ, Sahō no Terra)
  Voiced by: Hōchū Ōtsuka (Japanese); George Manley (Season 2), Garrett Schenck (Season 3) (English)
  Terra is a member of God's Right Seat blessed with the nature of "God's Medicine" and aligned with Archangel Raphael. He uses a spell called Execution of Light (光の処刑, Hikari no Shokei) that used its by-product (flour) to manipulate the "hierarchy" of everything around him. He appears to be a small, menacing-looking old man and is seen wearing a green ceremonial robe. In the Document of Constantine story arc, Terra meets Tōma and Itsuwa in a museum where the two tried to destroy a spell pipeline. In their fight later in Palace of the Popes, Terra seems to know something about Tōma's Imagine Breaker when he correctly deduced about his memory loss but he misses the chance to explain it to him. He is later killed by Acqua upon his return to Vatican City. In the Acqua of the Back story arc, Terra's corpse is sent to the Church of England as Acqua challenges them.
- Acqua of the Back (後方のアックア, Kōhō no Akkua; "Acqua of the Rear" in English dub) / William Orwell (ウィリアム=オルウェル, Uiriamu Oruueru)

Voiced by: Hiroki Tōchi (Japanese); Andrew T. Chandler (Season 2), Chris Ryan (Season 3) (English)
Acqua is a member of God's Right Seat blessed with the nature of "Power of God" and aligned with Archangel Gabriel. Because of his alignment, he is blessed with an ability called Divine Mother's Mercy (聖母の慈悲, Seibo no Jihi) that could nullify the liabilities of certain special spells to allow him to perform powerful spells under unfit conditions. Unlike the other members of God's Right Seat, he is not corrupt and does not ignore the opinions of the Pope. Before joining the Roman Orthodox Church, Acqua serves as a mercenary for the Church of England and is friends with the current Knight Leader of the Knights of England. His true name is William Orwell and his sorcery name is Flere210, "The one who changes the reason of tears" (その涙の理由を変える者, Sono Namida no Riyū o Kaeru Mono). Acqua is a Saint that endowed him with superhuman capabilities such as the strength to carry weapons twice as large as him. With the help of his Divine Mother's Mercy ability, he can use 100% of the capabilities offered to him as a Saint, which demonstrated a considerable gap between his abilities and Kaori's. In the Acqua of the Back story arc, he is defeated by Tōma and the Amakusa Catholics then he loses the Divine Mother's Mercy ability. In the British Royal Family story arc, Acqua returns to England during the British Halloween wielding a replica of the dragon slayer sword called "Ascalon" (アスカロン, Asukaron) and saves Princess Villian. He then fights his former friend and comrade Knight Leader. In the World War III story arc, Acqua heads to Russia to stop Fiamma's plans and saves Shiage and Rikō from a group of mercenaries upon encountering them. He ends up helping Accelerator and Hyōka against Archangel Gabriel and weakens the angel by absorbing its powers. Acqua returns in the New Testament: A Certain Magical Index light novel series during the Magic God Othinus story arc when he is temporarily freed from the Tower of London to assist the United Kingdom in their fight against GREMLIN. He later joins Carissa and Knight Leader during their hunt of Tōma and Othinus in Denmark.

- Fiamma of the Right (右方のフィアンマ, Uhō no Fianma)
  Voiced by: Toshiyuki Morikawa (Japanese); Christopher Wehkamp (English)
  Fiamma is the leader of God's Right Seat blessed with the nature of "Likeness of God" and aligned with Archangel Michael. He holds the symbol of miracles called Holy Right (聖なる右, Seinaru Migi) that could manifest a bird-like claw from his shoulder to use as his main form of attack. However, he is unable to use its full potential and believes that Tōma, Index, and Sasha held the answer to his dilemma. He is a tall, slim man wearing a red suit. In the British Royal Family story arc, Fiamma mocks a defeated Carissa as he reveals his influence that caused the Eurotunnel incident. He shows Queen Elizard's spiritual remote control for Index in front of her and Tōma. In the World War III story arc, he heads to Russia to capture Sasha, who served as the key to invoke Archangel Gabriel and to acquire the Star of Bethlehem, so that he could fix the elemental balance affecting the creation of the Holy Right ability and could gain full control of it. Knowing that Tōma is aboard the Star of Bethlehem, Fiamma fights him and tries absorbing the flesh of his right hand but he fearfully notices that his arm gathered not one but two massive and overwhelming powers. He is then challenged by Tōma, who remarked about his existence being the most powerful and his unreasonable stealing of the power of various churches; furthermore, Fiamma's powers always adjust to match his opponent's so he triggers the war to cause enough 'ill will' in the world to set it as 'the enemy that needs to be defeated' as a result of fearing that he does not have the 'power enough to save the world'. With his conviction lost and defeated, Fiamma is saved by Toma, who convinced him to live to change the future. However, Fiamma is seen by Aleister as a threat for knowing too much about the true purpose of Imagine Breaker and is brought to death by him. However, a dying Fiamma is found by Silvia and Ollerus and gets questioned about his Aeon of Osiris power and Aleister's Aeon of Horus power.

=== Russian Orthodox Church ===
- Krans R. Tsarskiy (クランス=R=ツァールスキー, Kuransu R Tsuārusukī)
  Voiced by: Asuna Tomari (Japanese); Derick Snow (English)
  Krans is a young boy who currently served as the Patriarch of the Russian Orthodox Church. In the World War III story arc, he is imprisoned in his palace by Nikolai. After he is rescued by Vasilisa, Krans provides information regarding a spell that ran the Star of Bethlehem. He later signs a proclamation ending the war. In New Testament: A Certain Magical Index light novel series, Krans arrives in the United Nations headquarters to represent Russia as France, the United Kingdom, the United States, and Vatican City convene an allied conference to defeat GREMLIN.
- Nikolai Tolstoy (ニコライ=トルストイ, Nikorai Torusutoi)
  Voiced by: Ryūnosuke Watanuki (Japanese); Kent Williams (English)
  Nikolai serves as a Russian bishop of the Russian Orthodox Church. He is known for his spiritual item based on Russian folklore about a witch who guarded two springs called Water of Death (死の水, Shi no Mizu) that could disintegrate a target using water. He allies with Fiamma in exchange for him to become the next Patriarch. In the World War III story arc, Nikolai falsifies a document that would mobilize the Russian military using Kran's electronic signature from a dummy document. He is later killed by Vasilisa after his spiritual item failed on her.

=== Annihilatus ===
- Vasilisa (ワシリーサ, Washirīsa)
  Voiced by: Yōko Honna (Japanese); Leah Clark (English)
  Vasilisa is the leader of Annihilatus and Sasha's superior, based on a heroine of Russian folklore of the same name. She shows her childish behavior, vanity towards skincare, and weird interest in Japanese otaku culture, which earned her a dislike from Sasha. In the British Royal Family story arc, Vasilisa helps Sasha to escape the Russian Orthodox Church and fights Skogsfru. In the World War III story arc, she arrives in Moscow and confronts Nikolai, who got killed by her. After she defeated the remaining guards in the palace, Vasilisa reunites with Krans. She then contacts Matthai to work with her to bring down the Star of Bethlehem. Vasilisa returns in New Testament: A Certain Magical Index light novel series as Kran's bodyguard during his visit to the United Nations headquarters. She is later sent to Denmark by the Patriarch to deal with Tōma and Othinus but she retreats after he defeated the leader of the Russian Orthodox Church. She is present near Egeskov Castle and observes afar Tōma's rescue of Othinus.
- Sasha Kreutzev (サーシャ=クロイツェフ, Sāsha Kuroitsefu)
  Voiced by: Yuka Terasaki (Japanese); Kate Oxley (English)
  Sasha is a thirteen-year-old Russian nun and an operative of Annihilatus. She is always seen carrying around a large number of magical torture weapons such as hammers and saws. She usually converses in a question-and-answer format. In the Angel Fall story arc, Sasha's body is taken over by Archangel Gabriel, who was called down to earth from heaven by the Angel Fall spell. After the events, she is placed under observation in Moscow due to the unusual effects her body suffered when the archangel possessed it. In the British Royal Family story arc, Sasha is told by Vasilisa to escape the Russian Orthodox Church because an order has been issued for her capture due to the residual Telesma left by Archangel Gabriel in her body. She later encounters Vento, who arrived in Russia to capture Fiamma, and is advised by her to seek asylum in Elizalina Alliance of Independent Nations. In the World War III story arc, Sasha gets captured by Fiamma to be used for his Project Bethlehem but she later manages to escape the Star of Bethlehem. She returns in New Testament: A Certain Magical Index light novel series as part of Krans' security detail during his visit to the United Nations headquarters. She later accompanies Vasilisa in Denmark to capture Tōma and Othinus but she retreats after he defeated the Patriarch's spell against him. She watches afar Tōma's rescue of Othinus near Egeskov Castle.
- Skogsfru (スクーグズヌフラ, Sukūguzunufura)
  Skogsfru is an operative of Annihilatus, based on Russian folklore about a fairy who lived in the woods and fell in love with a human. Her magic uses sexual spells. In the British Royal Family story arc, Skogsfru is sent by Nikolai to acquire Sasha but she encounters Vasilisa instead, and the two fight until she gets defeated when Vasilisa blew up the room with her spell.

=== Elizalina Alliance of Independent Nations ===
- Elizalina (エリザリーナ, Erizarīna)
  Voiced by: Naomi Shindō (Japanese); Mikaela Krantz (English)
  Elizalina is the leader of Elizalina Alliance of Independent Nations and the twin sister of Maiden of Versailles. She is well-loved by Elizalinans and is revered by them as a saint because she fights against Russians to gain Elizarina Alliance's independence. In the World War III story arc, Elizalina agrees to help Tōma and Lessar in their fight against Fiamma until they safely escort Sasha out of Elizarina Alliance as the country wants to be neutral during the war. She gets defeated by Fiamma when her palace got attacked by him.
- Longhe (ロンギエ, Rongie)
  Voiced by: Masashi Yamane
  Longe serves as one of the bodyguards of Elizalina. He is present in her palace when Fiamma attacked the place.
- Bellagi (ベラッギ, Beraggi)
  Voiced by: Ryou Sugisaki (Japanese); Phil Parsons (English)
  Bellagi is one of the bodyguards protecting Elizalina. He is present in her palace when Fiamma attacked the place.

=== Return of the Winged One ===
- Etzali (エツァリ, Etsari)
  Voiced by: Daisuke Kishio (Japanese); Justin Pate (English)
  Etzali is a magician of Return of the Winged One who disguised himself as Mitsuki. His name is likely based on the sixth month of the Aztec calendar. He uses a copy of the obsidian spear of the Aztec god representing Venus called the "Spear of Tlahuizcalpantecuhtli" (トラウィスカルパンテクウトリの槍, Torawisukarupantekūtori no Yari) that used the light from the said planet to destroy anything it falls upon. He is sent to Academy City as a spy to stop and undermine the Kamijō Faction, a group of espers and magicians who were acquaintances of Tōma and were supposedly led by him since they see the group as a threat to the truce between science and magic sides. In the Three Stories story arc, Etzali borrows the appearance of Mitsuki and attempts to befriend Mikoto to kill her but he ends up falling in love with her instead. After he failed to kill Tōma, Etzali makes him promise to protect Mikoto and the world around her. In the Skill-Out Uprising story arc, he stays in Academy City and joins GROUP to protect Mikoto from the shadows. In the Battle Royale story arc, Etzali is tasked by Motoharu to investigate Management's apartment. He takes the appearance of Yamate when his fellow operatives from BLOCK stormed the place and infiltrates the team's hideout to investigate their plan. He later encounters Xochitl, who arrived to kill him due to his betrayal with the magic cabal, at District 10's Reformatory but he defeats her and takes away her grimoire as it erodes her body. In the DRAGON story arc, Etzali and his fellow GROUP operatives infiltrate Shiokishi's base to find information about DRAGON. He meets Tecpatl, who disguised as one of Shiokishi's bodyguards to kill him with Tochtli's grimoire. He manages to use his experience from his encounter with Xochitl's grimoire to defeat and kill him instead. Etzali returns in New Testament: A Certain Magical Index light novel series during the Homecoming story arc when he visited Xochitl and Tochtli in a hospital and had a debate with them over his continuous use of Mitsuki's appearance. In Genesis Testament: A Certain Magical Index light novel series, Etzali and Xochitl head to the hospital where Tochtli rest to retrieve the latter as Operation Handcuffs against Academy City's dark side is being commenced.
- Xochitl (ショチトル, Shochitoru)
  Voiced by: Hitomi Ōwada (Japanese); Jill Harris (English)
  Xochitl is a magician of Return of the Winged One known as "Corpse Worker" (死体職人, Shitai Shokunin; lit. "Corpse Artisan") due to her magic ability to retrieve a dead person's will to verify if it is correct after they died. Her name means "flowers" in the Nahuatl language. She uses Macuahuitl as her primary weapon. In A Certain Scientific Railgun SS: Liberal Arts City side story, Xochitl arrives in Liberal Arts City to sink the artificial island and meets Ruiko during her field trip. She saves Ruiko from the United States' attempt to kill her. Xochitl's plan for the city is foiled by Mikoto's intervention. She is given a new order to destroy all evacuation ships to prevent leakage of Aztec knowledge but she disagrees and decides to defy Tecpatl's order despite knowing that she will be punished. As her punishment, Xochitl has a grimoire merged into her and is sent to Academy City to kill Etzali for his betrayal of the Aztec magic cabal and ends up joining MEMBER. In the Daihasei Festival story arc, she receives help from Ruiko as she tries to operate her unique cellphone. She saves her from an attack by Mitori's liquid metal puppet inside the liquid metal factory. In the Battle Royale story arc, Xochitl battles Etzali at District 10's Reformatory. However, with the grimoire draining away her life, she loses to him and is saved by him after he took possession of her grimoire. In the DRAGON story arc, Xochitl is confined in a hospital and meets Etzali and his fellow GROUP operatives. In New Testament: A Certain Magical Index light novel series, Xochitl shares her hospital room with Tochtli. She argues with Etzali about his continuous use of Mitsuki's face in front of them. In Genesis Testament: A Certain Magical Index light novel series, Xochitl uses a borrowed face to hide her identity and accompanies Etzali to retrieve Tochtli in the hospital as Anti-Skill targets members of Academy City's dark side during their Operation Handcuffs.
- Tecpatl (テクパトル, Tekupatoru)
  Voiced by: Junichi Yanagita (Japanese); Ian Ferguson (English)
  Tecpatl serves as the leader of Return of the Winged One. He wields the Moon Rabbit (月のウサギ, Tsuki no Usagi; lit. "Rabbit of the Moon") grimoire, a derivative of the Aztec calendar stone based on the legend of the fifth sun's creation. In A Certain Scientific Railgun SS: Liberal Arts City side story, Tecpatl leads the operation to destroy Liberal Arts City due to his belief in living peacefully once the battle with the United States that he referred to as "World Police" ends. In the DRAGON story arc, he takes the appearance of Shiokishi's bodyguard named Minobe to hunt down Etzali. After he injured Shiokishi, Tecpatl challenges Etzali but he is killed by him instead.
- Tochtli (トチトリ, Tochitori)
  Voiced by: Ayasa Itō (Japanese); Ariel Graham (English)
  Tochtli is a magician of Return of the Winged One and Xochitl's partner. Her name means "rabbit" in the Nahuatl language. In A Certain Scientific Railgun SS: Liberal Arts City side story, Tochtli flies the organization's plane called "Mixcoatl" to retrieve Xochitl who got stranded in Liberal Arts City and notes Ruiko's kindness towards her partner. She later supports Xochitl's decision to allow the civilians to evacuate the artificial island. As punishment for disobeying their orders, Tochtli is sedated to allow Tecpatl to use her bones as materials his grimoire used to attack. In the DRAGON story arc, she appears alongside Tecpatl as they confront Etzali. Tochtli is saved by Etzali after he killed the Aztec leader. In New Testament: A Certain Magical Index light novel series, Tochtli recovers in the hospital where Xochitl was confined. She addresses Etzali as her older brother and tells him to continue visiting them for her to have a peaceful hospitalization. She annoyingly teases Xochitl about Etzali's advantage of using Mitsuki's appearance. In Genesis Testament: A Certain Magical Index light novel series, Tochtli joins Etzali and Xochitl in watching the sunrise as they ponder the future aftershock of the failed Operation Handcuffs.

=== France ===
- The Maiden of Versailles (ヴェルサイユの聖女, Verusaiyu no Seijō)
  Voiced by: Yuka Keichō (Japanese); Mikaela Krantz (English)
  The Maiden of Versailles is the unnamed mysterious blonde, blue-eyed twin sister of Elizarina and one of the most powerful magicians in Europe. Both she and her sister descend from both the British and French royal families. She secretly rules France despite being placed under house arrest by the French government to serve as a ruse to fool her enemies. The Maiden of Versailles wields the magical sword Durendal. In the World War III story arc, the Maiden of Versailles leads the French invasion forces to fight against the British forces in the Battle of Dover Strait. She clashes with Carissa but she later works with her to defeat the sudden appearance of Archangel Gabriel. The Maiden of Versailles and Carissa work together to protect targeted Russian and Academy City forces from the archangel as English and French forces evacuate them. In New Testament: A Certain Magical Index light novel series, the Maiden of Versailles represents France during an allied conference in the United Nations headquarters alongside representatives from Russia, the United Kingdom, the United States, and Vatican City to plan their attack against GREMLIN. After they witnessed Tōma's efforts in saving Othinus, the Maiden of Versailles mentions to her allies her decision to not send someone to go after Tōma in the first place when he suddenly allied with the Magic God.

=== GREMLIN ===
- Othinus (オティヌス, Otinusu)
  Voiced by: Asami Seto
  Othinus is the leader of GREMLIN and the current Magic God, with her name equivalent to the Latin translation of Odin. She is always seen wearing an eye patch to cover her right eye. Othinus makes her debut in the fourth volume of New Testament: A Certain Magical Index light novel series when she arrived in Baggage City to confront Tōma then she crushes his right wrist and severs his hand. She makes timid with Ollerus but she withdraws when he revealed the presence of Fiamma and his power currently not negated by Tōma's destroyed right hand. She then raises Kagun from the dead to become an einherjar. In the Ichihanaran Festival story arc, Othinus meets up with GREMLIN members at a port in Tokyo Bay and cuts off the right arm of Thor, who revealed to be Ollerus in disguise, as punishment for his failure to capture Fräulein. In the Magic God Othinus story arc, Othinus destroys the whole universe using the Lance of Gungnir and recreates many worlds for Tōma to be tormented and driven into suicide. After he died in their looping fight later, she realizes Tōma is the only person who could understand her and decides to return him to his original world. Othinus accepts Tōma's help to retrieve her right eye in a lake near Egeskov Castle for her to become human again. At the end of their journey in Denmark, she turns into a fifteen-centimeter fairy and begins to live with him in his dormitory. Othinus calls Tōma her human "understander". In the Mental Out story arc, Othinus becomes displeased at Tōma, who sneaked out of his hospital room last night, for removing his cast. In the St. Germain story arc, Othinus pushes Tōma to buy her a dollhouse to keep herself safe from Sphynx. She later helps him in his fight against St. Germain who took over the Dianoid building. In the World Rejecter story arc, Othinus tags along with Tōma on his way to buy ingredients and encounters Kakeru. In the Salome story arc, Othinus secretly sneaks into Tōma's bag and reveals herself in front of his classmates upon their arrival at his class' temporary school. In the Element story arc, Othinus stays in Tōma's temporary school as she experiences the heatwave and looks after Sphynx. In the Kamisato Rescue story arc, Othinus waits alongside Index for Tōma to arrive at District 7's station plaza per his message. She later bites him upon his return to the school due to his failure to meet her up earlier. In the Aleister Crowley story arc, Othinus joins Tōma and his friends in infiltrating the Windowless Building to find a way to remove the cursed magic sword from Maika. In the Processor Suit story arc, Othinus reunites with Tōma at Heaven Canceller's hospital after they got separated the whole day since the launch of the Windowless Building outside Earth. In the Coronzon story arc, Othinus joins Tōma on his quest in the United Kingdom to defeat Coronzon. In the Kamijō story arc, Othinus helps Tōma to confront his doppelganger inside the Windsor Castle. Othinus returns in Genesis Testament: A Certain Magical Index light novel series when she helped Tōma to defeat Norito using her knowledge as a Magic God. She encounters Anna and witnesses her kiss with him. She becomes furious at Anna for infecting Tōma with a St. Germain virus and discusses the situation with Index, who prayed in the altar inside Heaven Canceller's hospital. She then works with Index to save the patients who got injured from the magic they learned at R&C Occultics' website.
- Saronia A. Irivika (サローニャ=A=イリヴィカ, Sarōnya A Irivika)
  Saronia is a former member of the Russian Orthodox Church who disappeared in her mission in Vladivostok during World War III. She becomes a member of GREMLIN to fulfill her goal of making Russia continue its fight against Academy City. She bases her magic around the legend of the forest spirit Leshy to mind control people. Saronia debuts in the third volume of New Testament: A Certain Magical Index light novel series as the primary antagonist.
- Cendrillon (サンドリヨン, Sandoriyon)
  Cendrillon is a young blonde French magician. Her name is the French word for Cinderella. She uses the story of Cinderella to transform parts of it into an attack spell but her magic ability has a time limit of "midnight". Cendrillon is first introduced in the third volume of New Testament: A Certain Magical Index light novel series as a member of GREMLIN who was sent by the group to stop the bomb that Leivinia set up in New Honolulu International Airport. She defeats her guards using a spell based on Cinderella's glass slipper that forcibly widened or reduced their feet sizes into her foot size of 22.5 centimetres (8.9 in). She is defeated by Leivinia when the latter rammed a jet fuel tanker into her but she is left heavily bleeding after Saronia used a spell to force her into injuring herself as a means of silencing her. Cendrillon appears to have survived her predicament and is being held by American forces alongside Saronia. She escapes her imprisonment and upon confronting Marian, becomes angry at GREMLIN for their denial of helping her to turn the United States into a theocratic country. She attacks Marian but she gets defeated by her, who planned to turn her into furniture. In the Baggage City story arc, Cendrillon reappears in the form of a table inside Marian's room. In the Ichihanaran Festival story arc, Cendrillon's body is reconstructed with the help of an unaware Shizuri when the "ingredients" for her body parts were sent to Academy City. She then encounters an injured Tōma, whom she needed for her revenge against GREMLIN. Upon hearing Tōma's mention of defeating Marian back in Baggage City, Cendrillon agrees to help him by creating a brain from her leftover ingredients for Fräulein to eat instead of Last Order's brain.
- Thor (トール, Tōru)
  Voiced by: Soma Saito
  Thor is the representative combat member of GREMLIN, based on the Norse god of thunder and lightning of the same name. In the Ichihanaran Festival story arc, he disguises himself in the form of Mikoto and meets up with Tōma. When his identity got revealed, Thor requests Tōma's help in saving Fräulein inside the Windowless Building. Thor later reveals his intention behind saving Fräulein is to simulate his power growth through real-life battles. Thor uses electric arc blades in his fight with Tōma. He allows Ollerus to borrow his appearance for the latter to sneak in the GREMLIN and ponders whether he will continue his operations as a GREMLIN member after he betrayed them. In the Magic God Othinus story arc, Thor shows up at the Egeskov Castle and defeats GREMLIN members who planned to kill Othinus for her betrayal. He fights Tōma for the second time but he is eventually defeated yet satisfied with the battle experience he gained.
- Marian Slingeneyer (マリアン=スリンゲナイヤー, Marian Suringunaiya)
  Voiced by: Hiromi Igarashi
  Marian is a Dvergr and a key member of GREMLIN. She serves as Kagun's mentor after he left Academy City, becoming closer to him than to any other GREMLIN members. Her magic allows her to transform people into objects. Marian possesses Dáinsleif but she is instructed by Othinus to not remove the sword from its scabbard. Marian is introduced in the third volume of New Testament: A Certain Magical Index light novel series after the events that transpired in Hawaii. She encounters Cendrillon and tells her that GREMLIN never intended to go with her plan of turning the United States into a theocratic state, causing the French magician to attack her but she defeats her and wonders whether to transform her into a wardrobe or table. In the Baggage City story arc, Marian fights Byōri Kihara and defeats her at the garbage incinerator. She later encounters Maria and a Kōga ninja named Shuri Ōmi but she struggles to defeat Maria due to her esper ability. Marian witnesses Kagun's death and begins to mentally break down as she prepares to use Dáinsleif but she is defeated by Tōma. She sees Kagun carrying her after Othinus turned him into an einherjar. In the Ichihanaran Festival story arc, Marian arrives at Academy City alongside Thor and Mjölnir for their mission to retrieve Fräulein inside the Windowless Building but she falls into Tōma's trick when she found her wanted poster from Anti-Skill due to her involvement in Baggage City. She is later knocked down by Thor in her hideout. In the Magic God Othinus story arc, Marian begins to create the Lance of Gungnir for Othinus. When Othinus returned Tōma to his original world, Marian heads to Denmark to hunt down the Magic God and ends up fighting Tōma but she is knocked down during the battle with her summoned beings.
- Mjölnir (ミョルニル, Myoruniru)
  Mjölnir is a female magician of GREMLIN in cylindrical form and Marian's partner, based on Thor's hammer of the same name. Her appearance is caused by Marian's magic power and can change into other shapes such as a sphere and a cube. Mjölnir is introduced in the second volume of New Testament: A Certain Magical Index light novel series on-board the Radiosonde Castle. In the Hawaii Invasion story arc, she accompanies Marian and is used by her to defeat Cendrillon. In the Ichihanaran Festival story arc, Mjölnir accompanies Thor and Marian on their mission to retrieve Fräulein inside the Windowless Building. She witnesses Thor knocking down Marian but she is convinced by him to not endanger her partner since she is needed for the creation of the Lance of Gungnir. In the Magic God Othinus story arc, Mjölnir decides to not fight Tōma and picks up the defeated Marian to retreat.
- Útgarða-Loki (ウートガルザ・ロキ, Utogaruza-Roki)
  Útgarða-Loki is an illusionist of GREMLIN, based on the ruler of Útgarða of the same name. He is sent to Baggage City and deals with a representative of Science Guardian until he is interrupted by the arrival of Ransū Kihara.
- Fenrir (フェンリル, Fenriru)
  Fenrir is a member of GREMLIN, based on the Norse mythological wolf of the same name. He is sent to Alaska to destroy the anti-GREMLIN force's NORAD base to cut off their intelligence network and encounters Oriana, who arrived to stop his plan.
- Freyja (フレイヤ, Fureiya)
  Freyja is a fetus magician of GREMLIN, based on the Norse fertility goddess of the same name. She resides in her mother's womb and takes over her body to save her from death. She uses a spiritual item called "Brísingamen" to summon creatures. In the Magic God Othinus story arc, Freyja summons Níðhöggr that destroyed Tōma and his friends' plane over Tokyo during the invasion of GREMLIN in the city. She later fights Tōma, Index, and Mikoto above the moving train but she eventually ceases being antagonistic when he convinced her that she did not need Othinus' power to ensure her mother's safety.
- Hel (ヘル, Heru)
  Hel is a member of GREMLIN, based on the Norse goddess of death of the same name. She is tasked to destroy the allied force's supply ships and routes in the Pacific Ocean to cease their ammunition supply but her plan is intercepted by Silvia and Brunhild.
- Loki (ロキ, Roki)
  Loki is a member of GREMLIN, based on the Norse god of trickery of the same name. He reveals to be the one who cunningly deceived world leaders of Sargasso's location and led Carissa, Acqua, and the Knight Leader to invade the North Sea around Iceland instead of Tokyo Bay.
- Jörmungandr (ヨルムンガンド, Yorumungando)
  Jörmungandr is a member of GREMLIN, based on the Norse sea serpent of the same name. He intercepts the incoming Russian bombers to prevent them from interfering with GREMLIN's invasion of Tokyo and encounters Stiyl with his Innocentius.

=== Ollerus' group ===
- Ollerus (オッレルス, Orrerusu)
  Voiced by: Nobunaga Shimazaki (Japanese); Brad Hawkins (English)
  Ollerus is a magician who once had the chance to become a Magic God instead of Othinus, with his name based on Ullr. His magic ability is called "Hliðskjálf" that could change life energy and normal magical power into an unexplainable type of power. His power is so considerable that when Gunha fought him seriously, Ollerus only toys with him during the battle. He is currently being pursued by various magical organizations that sought his power but he manages to elude them. Ollerus is accompanied by Silvia, who acted cruelly to him on the surface yet still deeply cared for him. Ollerus makes an appearance in the final episode of A Certain Magical Index III anime series when he and Silvia found an injured Fiamma. He returns in the fourth volume of New Testament: A Certain Magical Index light novel series when he arrived in Baggage City to confront Othinus, who recently crippled Tōma's right hand. After the confrontation, Ollerus helps in restoring Tōma's destroyed hand and undoing Marian's spell to her victims that included Cendrillon. In the Ichihanaran Festival story arc, Ollerus and his team consisted of Fiamma, Silvia, Brunhild, and Leivinia arrive in Academy City to foil GREMLIN's plan of retrieving Fräulein inside the Windowless Building. He later meets Tōma being tasked by Seiri to buy food for the class. At the end of the fight between his group and GREMLIN, Ollerus successfully disguises himself as Thor and offers Othinus the organs of Teitoku as the replacement for Fräulein to create a holistic esper. In the Magic God Othinus story arc, Ollerus is present in Sargasso located at Tokyo Bay and secretly sends a message to the Church of England about its location. Before Othinus destroys the whole universe with her Lance of Gungnir, he and Fiamma work together to stab her with a spell that could transform her into a fairy. In Denmark later, Ollerus shows up to stop Silvia and Brunhild from killing Tōma and Othinus.
- Silvia (シルビア, Shirubia)
  Voiced by: Yū Kobayashi (Japanese); Anastasia Muñoz (English)
  Silvia is the head maid for the British royal family and a Saint. She is acquainted with both the Knight Leader and Kaori. Silvia leaves the United Kingdom to hone her skills as a maid and meets Ollerus on her travels. While she often becomes angry at him for his overly casual attitude and punishes him, Silvia stays with Ollerus because she believes he needs to be cared for. After she completed her training as a maid in Milan, she chooses to stay with him despite the royal family's repeated orders for her to return. Silvia makes a cameo in the final episode of A Certain Magical Index III anime series when she and Ollerus picked up a badly injured Fiamma. She returns in the fourth volume of New Testament: A Certain Magical Index light novel during the time the artificial Valkyries attack Brunhild inside a hospital. In the Ichihanaran Festival story arc, Silvia accompanies Ollerus in Academy City to stop GREMLIN's plan of retrieving Fräulein. She later fights Thor but she stops her attacks when Leivinia got defeated by Tōma. As they leave Academy City, Silvia teases Leivinia's actions with Tōma like a little sister being scolded by her older brother. In the Magic God Othinus story arc, Silvia is on board the fleet of ships heading towards Tokyo Bay and encounters Hel. In Denmark later, she hunts down Othinus to take revenge for what she had done to Ollerus and gruesomely beats Tōma to make the Magic God feel how to lose someone she cared for.
- Brunhild Eiktobel (ブリュンヒルド=エイクトベル, Buryunhirudo Eikutoberu)
  Brunhild is a magician from Finland who served as a Saint and a Valkyrie at the same time, with her name likely based on Brunhild. She has very long and curly blonde hair and wears clothes similar to the Valkyries from Norse mythology. She uses a big sword and the replica of Odin's spear. As she possesses the quality of a Christian Saint, which was deemed to be foreign by the Norse societies, Brunhild has been a target to kill since a young age, resulting in the deaths of people around her. She eventually decides to replicate the Gungnir to hopefully save a boy named Ceillier Flatley who fell in a coma due to attempted suicide as a result of the guilt from serving as a tool to make Brunhild mentally suffer under the Five Great Norse Societies, which managed to capture her by the time both of her powers conflict thus canceling out each other. After she recovered her power, Brunhild destroys the Five Great Norse Societies: "Those Who Nurture the World Tree", "The Knowledge Carved Into Iron", "The Champions Rising from the Sea", "Those Who Know the Words of God's Sword", and the "Golden Forged Hammer in the Earth" but she is eventually defeated by Kaori after several battles. However, she manages to save Ceillier from his comatose after she figured out the true nature of the magic that resulted in his state. In the fourth volume of New Testament: A Certain Magical Index light novel series, Brunhild fights the artificial Valkyries sent by GREMLIN while visiting Ceillier in a hospital but she is outnumbered until Silvia and Leivinia arrive to help her. In the Ichihanaran Festival story arc, Brunhild is part of Ollerus' group that arrived at Academy City to stop GREMLIN's plan of retrieving Fräulein. She later fights Mikoto but she stops when Leivinia got defeated by Tōma and leaves Academy City along with Leivinia and Silvia. In the Magic God Othinus story arc, Brunhild arrives in Denmark with Silvia to hunt down Tōma and Othinus and witnesses her partner's gruesome beating of him as she prepares to kill the Magic God.

=== Others ===
- Ladylee Tangleroad (レディリー=タングルロード, Redirī Tangururōdo)
  Voiced by: Ayane Sakura (Japanese); Maxey Whitehead (English)
  Ladylee Tangleroad is a magician and the president of Orbit Portal Company. She spearheads the construction of a space elevator called "Endymion" after the Orion incident. Ladylee Tangleroad is an immortal living for almost a thousand years after she ate a magic fruit called "ambrosia". She plans on ending her life already by destroying the Earth's Northern Hemisphere using Endymion and Arisa's voice, as the space elevator symbolizes the magical Tower of Babylon and her singing power can activate a magical array in space.
- Esther Rosenthal (エステル=ローゼンタール, Esuteru Rōzentāru)
  Voiced by: Yurika Kubo (Japanese); Amber Lee Connors (English)
  Esther Rosenthal is one of the heroines introduced in the A Certain Scientific Accelerator franchise as a magician who specialized in necromancy. In the Necromancer story arc, Esther evades the pursuing Disciplinary Action and enters a hospital room, where Accelerator rest. She asks him for information about Last Order but she is caught by a Disciplinary Action operative named Nishio. Esther manages to escape them and later teams up with Accelerator to foil the plan of rouge Anti-Skill members to add a new layer to the world using Last Order.
- Aiwass (エイワス, Eiwasu)
  Voiced by: Mitsuru Miyamoto (Japanese); Andy Mullins (English)
  Aiwass is a mysterious being based on an entity's voice of the same name who is summoned by Aleister Crowley and the writer of The Book of the Law. He judges things based on their value, unlike Aleister who judges them according to their efficiency. Aiwass manifests before Accelerator and the two clash. He later mentions to him a method of saving Last Order by finding Index in Russia. During World War III, Aiwass expands the AIM diffusion field into Russia with the assistance of the Misaka Network and instructs Hyōka Kazakiri to restrain Archangel Gabriel.
- Archangel Gabriel (神の力 (ガブリエル), Kami no Chikara (Gaburieru); lit. "Power of God")
  Voiced by: Yuka Terasaki (Japanese); Kate Oxley (English)
  Gabriel is one of the four Archangels of God, who was referred to as "The Power of God". The archangel is accidentally brought down to earth and switched bodies with Sasha when the Angel Fall spell was cast. Eager to return to Heaven and punish the one responsible for the spell, the archangel joins Tōma and his companions under the alias "Misha Kreutzev". Upon learning Tōya is responsible for the spell activation, Misha tries to kill him but she engages in battle with Kaori instead. The archangel returns to Heaven after Motoharu destroyed the site where the spell was cast. During World War III, the archangel is summoned back by Fiamma and fights Kazakiri (in Fuse Kazakiri mode) and Accelerator. Gabriel returns in New Testament: A Certain Magical Index light novel series when Samuel Liddell manifested the archangel for his attack against Aleister.
- Archangel Michael (神の如き者 (ミカエル), Kami no Gotokisha (Mikaeru); lit. "The Likeness of God")
  Archangel Michael is one of the four Archangels of God, who was referred to as "The Likeness of God". In the World War III story arc, the archangel is revealed by Fiamma to be the one who got brought down to Earth when the Angel Fall spell was cast, causing Fiamma to target Sasha because of the archangel's residual Telesma in her body. Michael is mistaken by Kaori for Gabriel due to a mix-up in the essence of Heaven by unknown forces, which switched Michael and Gabriel's positions.
- Fräulein Kreutune (フロイライン=クロイトゥーネ, Furoirain Kuroitūne)
  Fräulein Kreutune is a mysterious woman who exists for a long time and is imprisoned in the Windowless Building until her eventual rescue by Toma Kamijo and Thor. She becomes friends with Last Order and Fremea Seivelun.
- Dion Fortune (ダイアン=フォーチュン, Daian Fōchun)
  Voiced by: Rika Tachibana
  Dion Fortune is a magician belonging to the remnants of the Golden Dawn cabal. Her magic is aided by a black box called Archetype Processor, which provides unpredictable results yet is always in her favor. Despite being reproduced by Coronzon from tarot for the demon's fight against Aleister Crowley in London, Fortune later befriends Shiage Hamazura after being saved by his group. Following the events surrounding Coronzon and the incident involving Toma Kamijo's doppelgänger in Windsor Castle, Fortune is accepted by Queen Elizard as the new archbishop of the Church of England under the watch of Princess Villian.
- Qliphah Puzzle 545 (クリファパズル545, Kurifa Pazuru 545)
  Voiced by: Nichika Ōmori
  Qliphah Puzzle 545 is an artificial demon created by Coronzon as a weapon against Aleister Crowley. She later makes a contract with Accelerator to serve as his advisor in anything related to magic in exchange for him sparing her from death.

== Other characters ==
- Musset (ミュッセ, Myusse)
  Voiced by: Eiichirō Tokumoto (Japanese); Stephen Fu (English)
  Musset is a French terrorist and member of a French anti-English organization. In the British Royal Family story arc, he boards the Sky Bus 365 plane to sabotage its flight stabilizers near Tōma's seat. He later strangles Index, who witnessed his activity, inside a storage closet but he is attacked by Tōma to save her. Musset's plan to sabotage United Kingdom's air routes is finally foiled by Tōma and Necessarius.
- Eiker Lugoni (エーカー=ルゴーニ, Ēkā Rugōni)
  Voiced by: Takahiro Shimada (Japanese); Jim Johnson (English)
  Eiker is a French terrorist and member of a French anti-English organization. In the British Royal Family story arc, Eiker patiently waits in the cargo hold of the Sky Bus 365 plane with explosives. He is knocked down by Tōma but he manages to get up and grab a grenade. He is suddenly sucked in by a hole that Stiyl had blown on the side of the plane. His grenade is knocked away by Tōma as he screams in pain.
- Robert Katze (ロベルト=カッツェ, Roberuto Kattsue)
  Robert Katze is the current President of the United States of America who is introduced in volume 3 of Shinyaku Toaru Majutsu no Index where he becomes involved in the magical crisis involving Academy City and the main cast, forming an alliance with Tōma.
- Olay Blueshake (オーレイ=ブルーシェイク, Ōrei Burūsheiku)

Known as "The Media Queen", she is a highly influential businesswoman in America who attempts to take over America and turn it into a theocratic state.

- Lindy Blueshake (リンディ=ブルーシェイク, Rindi Burūsheiku)

Lindy is Olay's daughter who was targeted during the Hawaii Invasion in hopes of using her as leverage to bargain with Olay. She has since inherited her mother's economical empire after Olay's capture. Even though her company was initially destined for bankruptcy due to requiring to fund repair and reconstructions, it's back in business with the support of multiple several financial investment companies such as Tōya Kamijō's parent company.

- Patricia Birdway (パトリシア バードウェイ, Patorishia Bādowei)
  Voiced by: Satomi Amano
  Patricia Birdway is Leivinia Birdway's younger sister. She has a Ph.D. at the young age of 12, becoming a renowned researcher who got worked on university-run projects and sponsored by Academy City or its cooperative institutions to join laboratories and research ships as a guest researcher. Her twenty or more published research papers attract the attention of schools that wanted to bring her in. In the World Rejecter story arc, Patricia accompanies an Academy City-sponsored research team to Antarctica where she got infected by the Sample Shoggoth parasite. She eventually arrives in Academy City as she seeks medical institutions that would cure her. Patricia is saved by Magic God Nephthys who converted her own body into fats that would replace the ones consumed by the parasite. Despite the recent events that transpired in the story arc, she still shows oblivion about the existence of magic.
