= Homicide (disambiguation) =

Homicide is the act of killing of another human.

Homicide may also refer to:

== People ==
- Homicide (wrestler) (born 1977), American professional wrestler, born as Nelson Erazo
- DJ Homicide (born 1970), American DJ formerly of Sugar Ray

== Arts, entertainment and media ==
=== Films and television ===
- Homicide (1949 film), an American film directed by Felix Jacoves
- Homicide (1991 film), an American film by David Mamet
- Homicide (Australian TV series), a 1964–1977 Australian police procedural series

==== Simon's book and related media ====
- Homicide: A Year on the Killing Streets (1991), a non-fiction crime book by David Simon
  - Homicide: Life on the Street, a 1993–1999 American TV series inspired by David Simon's book
    - Homicide: The Movie (2000), a TV movie sequel to the series

=== Music ===
- "Homicide" (song), a song by Logic from his album Confessions of a Dangerous Mind
- "Homicide", a song by 999 from Separates
- "Homicide", a song by the German rapper Casper from his EP Grundstein
- "Homicide", a song by Psapp from The Camel's Back
- "Homicide", a song by Wiz Khalifa from mixtape called Cabin Fever
- "Homicide", a song from the soundtrack of Danganronpa 2: Goodbye Despair
- Homixide Gang, a rap duo signed to Playboi Carti's Opium label
