= Do Something Wrong =

Do Something Wrong EP
- Cover art by Galia Durant

EP by Psapp
- Released: 2003
- Genre: Electronic
- Length: 19:37
- Label: Melodic
- Producers: Carim Clasmann, Galia Durant

Psapp chronology
Do Something Wrong EP (2003)	Northdown (2004)

Do Something Wrong is the first EP released by electronic music duo Psapp.

== Track listing ==
All tracks are written by Carim Clasmann and Galia Durant, except where noted.

Side A
No.	Title	Length
1.	"Calm Down" (Psapp, Tim Whelan)	4:20
2.	"Biskitt"	1:44
3.	"Pocket"	3:27

Side B
No.	Title	Length
4.	"Dad's Breakdown"	2:41
5.	"Infra Red"	2:50
6.	"Northdown C"	4:35

== Personnel ==
- Carim Clasmann
- Galia Durant

== Notes ==
- "Calm Down" was later released on Tiger, My Friend.
- "Biskitt" was later released on Early Cats and Tracks.
- "Dad's Breakdown" and "Northdown C" were later released on Early Cats and Tracks Volume 2.
- "Dad's Breakdown" features spoken word vocals performed by Durant's father.
- A song entitled "Do Something Wrong" would appear the following year on Psapp's Rear Moth EP and later on Early Cats and Tracks.
