= That's the Spirit (disambiguation) =

That's the Spirit is the fifth studio album by British rock band Bring Me the Horizon.

That's the Spirit may also refer to:

- That's the Spirit (1933 film), an American short film featuring song, dance, and music performances
- That's the Spirit (1945 film), an American comedy film
- "That's the Spirit", 2013 song by Psapp from What Makes Us Glow
