= Early Cats and Tracks =

Early Cats and Tracks EP
- Cover art by Galia Durant

EP by Psapp
- Released: September 26, 2005
- Genre: Electronica
- Length: 19:41
- Label: Domino
- Producer: Carim Clasmann; Galia Durant

Psapp chronology
Tiger, My Friend (2004)	Early Cats and Tracks EP (2005)	The Only Thing I Ever Wanted (2006)

Early Cats and Tracks is the fourth EP released by electronica band Psapp. Unlike the band‘s other EPs, Early Cats and Tracks was released exclusively as a digital download through the iTunes Store rather than on vinyl record. The EP is often overlooked, possibly due to its digital distribution, and the fact that the only new track on the album is "In My Head". The band did not announce plans to release the EP on a more conventional format (such as CD or Vinyl).

== Track listing ==
All tracks are written by Carim Clasmann and Galia Durant.

No.	Title	Length
1.	"Dirt Is Falling"	3:37
2.	"Do Something Wrong"	3:49
3.	"Grand Opening"	3:46
4.	"Side Dish"	3:22
5.	"Biskitt"	1:46
6.	"In My Head"	3:21

== Personnel ==
Psapp

- Carim Clasmann
- Galia Durant

Additional personnel

- Mark Glover - clarinet, "Dirt Is Falling"
- Shawn Lee - vocals, "Grand Opening"

== Notes ==
- "Biskitt" was originally released on Do Something Wrong.
- "Grand Opening" and "Do Something Wrong" were originally released on Rear Moth.
- "Dirt Is Falling" and "Side Dish" were originally released on Northdown.
- "Side Dish" was later released on the Hi EP.
