= Early Cats and Tracks Volume 2 =

- Cover art by Galia Durant

EP by Psapp
- Released: April 6, 2009
- Genre: Electronica
- Length: 30:51
- Label: Domino
- Producer: Carim Clasmann; Galia Durant

Early Cats and Tracks Volume 2 is Psapp's sixth EP, released exclusively on iTunes on April 6, 2009. Like the first Early Cats and Tracks, it is distributed exclusively as a digital release and contains previously released material.

== Track listing ==
All tracks are written by Carim Clasmann and Galia Durant.

No.	Title	Length
1.	"Feel the Fur"	3:58
2.	"Dad's Breakdown"	3:04
3.	"Scissory"	4:09
4.	"Northdown C"	4:38
5.	"Happy Lamb"	3:53
6.	"Whores"	2:24
7.	"How Things Turn Up"	4:57
8.	"Who Knows My Ohs"	3:47

== Personnel ==
- Carim Clasmann
- Galia Durant

== Notes ==
- "Feel the Fur" was originally released on Buttons and War.
- "Dad's Breakdown" and "Northdown C" were originally released on Do Something Wrong.
- "Happy Lamb" was originally released on Northdown.
- "Whores" was originally released on Rear Moth.
- "Dad's Breakdown" and "How Things Turn Up" feature spoken word vocals performed by Durant's father.
