= The Monster Song =

- Cover art by Galia Durant

Single by Psapp

from the album The Camel's Back
- Released: November 3, 2008
- Recorded: 2008
- Genre: Electronic
- Length: 6:38
- Label: Domino Records (1993)
- Songwriters: Carim Clasmann, Galia Durant
- Producers: Carim Clasmann, Galia Durant

Psapp singles chronology
"The Camel's Back" (2008)	"The Monster Song" (2008)	"I Want That" (2009)

"The Monster Song" is the lead single from Psapp's album The Camel's Back. It was released on 3 November 2008 in the UK, a week after the parent album became available. The single peaked at No. 34 on the UK Independent Singles Chart.

Comparing to the sound of their prior album The Only Thing I Ever Wanted, one reviewer describes the song as "optimistically bright rather than mutedly reflective". Another reviewer describes the song as a "lullaby".

== Track listing ==
All tracks are written by Carim Clasmann and Galia Durant.

No.	Title	Length
1.	"The Monster Song"	3:29
2.	"Look at Me"	1:52
3.	"Overlord"	1:17

== Personnel ==
- Carim Clasmann
- Galia Durant
