= List of A Certain Magical Index albums =

This is a list of albums attributed to the Japanese anime adaptations of the light novel series A Certain Magical Index.

== Anime OP/ED ==
=== PSI-missing ===
PSI-missing is a single by Mami Kawada released on October 29, 2008, in Japan by Geneon. The song "PSI-missing" was the first opening theme to the anime Toaru Majutsu no Index. The coupling song Ame (雨, Rain) was used as an insert song in episode twelve of the same anime series.

==== Track listing ====
1. "PSI-missing" – 4:23
  - Lyrics by: Mami Kawada
  - Music & Arrangement by: Tomoyuki Nakazawa
2. "Ame" (雨) – 4:40
3. "PSI-missing" -instrumental- – 4:23
4. "Ame" -instrumental- (雨) – 4:36

=== Rimless ~Fuchinashi no Sekai~ ===
Rimless ~Fuchinashi no Sekai~ (Rimless～フチナシノセカイ～)is a single by Iku released on November 26, 2008, in Japan by Geneon. The song "Rimless ~Fuchinashi no Sekai~" was the first ending theme to the anime Toaru Majutsu no Index.

==== Track listing ====
1. "Rimless ~Fuchinashi no Sekai~" (Rimless～フチナシノセカイ～) – 4:01
  - Lyrics by: IKU
  - Music by: IKU, Kazuya Takase
  - Arrangement by: Kazuya Takase
2. "Nagori no tsuki" (名残の月) – 4:39
  - Music & Lyrics by: IKU
  - Arrangement by: Blues T
3. "Rimless ~Fuchinashi no Sekai~" -instrumental- (Rimless～フチナシノセカイ～) – 4:01
4. "Nagori no tsuki" -instrumental- (名残の月) – 4:35

=== masterpiece ===
masterpiece is a single by Mami Kawada released on February 4, 2009, in Japan by Geneon. The song "masterpiece" was the second opening theme to the anime Toaru Majutsu no Index. The song "jellyfish" was the insert song for the anime as well in episode 23.

==== Track listing ====
1. "masterpiece" – 4:37
  - Lyrics by: Mami Kawada
  - Music & Arrangement by: Maiko Iuchi
2. "jellyfish" – 4:26
  - Lyrics by: Mami Kawada
  - Music by: Tomoyuki Nakazawa
  - Arrangement by: Tomoyuki Nakazawa, Takeshi Ozaki
3. "masterpiece" -instrumental- – 4:37
4. "jellyfish" -instrumental- - 4:24

=== Chikaigoto ~Sukoshi Dake Mou Ichido~ ===
Chikaigoto ~Sukoshi Dake Mou Ichido~ (誓い言 〜スコシだけもう一度〜) is a single by Iku released on February 25, 2009, in Japan by Geneon. The song "Chikaigoto ~Sukoshi Dake Mou Ichido~" was the second ending theme to the anime Toaru Majutsu no Index.

==== Track listing ====
1. "Chikaigoto ~Sukoshi Dake Mou Ichido~" (誓い言 〜スコシだけもう一度〜)
  - Lyrics & Music by: Iku
  - Arrangement by: Kazuya Takase
2. "Yurari Haru" (ユラリハル)
  - Lyrics & Music by: Iku
  - Arrangement by: Kaoru Ookubo
3. "Chikaigoto ~Sukoshi Dake Mou Ichido~" -instrumental- (誓い言 〜スコシだけもう一度〜)
4. "Yurari Haru" -instrumental- (ユラリハル)

=== No buts! ===
No buts! is a single by Mami Kawada released on November 3, 2010, in Japan by Geneon. The song "No Buts!" was the first opening theme to the anime Toaru Majutsu no Index II.

==== Track listing ====
1. "No buts!" – 3:37
  - Lyrics by: Mami Kawada
  - Music & Arrangement by:
2. "SATANIC" – 4:53
  - Lyrics by:
  - Music by:
  - Arrangement by:
3. "No buts!" -instrumental- – 3:37
4. "SATANIC" -instrumental- - 4:50

=== Magic∞world ===
Magic∞world is a single by Maon Kurosaki released on November 24, 2010, in Japan by Geneon. The song "Magic∞world" was the first ending theme to the anime Toaru Majutsu no Index II.

==== Track listing ====
1. "Magic∞world" – 4:08
  - Lyrics by:
  - Music & Arrangement by:
2. "ANSWER" – 5:11
  - Lyrics by:
  - Music by:
3. "Magic∞world" -instrumental- – 4:07
4. "ANSWER" -instrumental- - 5:10

=== See visionS ===
See visionS is a single by Mami Kawada released on February 16, 2011, in Japan by Geneon. The song "See visionS" was the second opening theme to the anime Toaru Majutsu no Index II.

==== Track listing ====
1. "See visionS" – 5:26
  - Lyrics by: Mami Kawada
  - Music & Arrangement by:
2. "Don't interrupt me" – 4:16
  - Lyrics by:
  - Music by:
3. "See visionS" -instrumental- – 5:26
4. "Don't interrupt me" -instrumental- - 4:17
5. "PSI-missing -2011 remix-" - 04:30

=== Memories Last ===
Memories Last is a single by Maon Kurosaki released on March 2, 2011, in Japan by Geneon. The song "Memories Last" was the second ending theme to the anime Toaru Majutsu no Index II.

==== Track listing ====
1. "Memories Last" – 4:08
  - Lyrics by: Kurosaki Maon
  - Music: Tomoyuki Nakazawa
  - Arrangement: Tomoyuki Nakazawa, Takeshi Ozaki
2. "Best friends" – 4:58
  - Lyrics by: Kurosaki Maon
  - Music&Arrangement: Shinya Saito
3. "Memories Last" -instrumental- – 4:07
4. "Best friends" -instrumental- - 4:57

== Soundtracks ==
=== Toaru Majutsu no Index Original Soundtrack 1 - ELECTROMASTER ===
Toaru Majutsu no Index Original Soundtrack 1 - ELECTROMASTER

Soundtrack album by Maiko Iuchi
- Released: January 23, 2009
- Genre: Anime soundtrack
- Label: Geneon

The Toaru Majutsu no Index Original Soundtrack 1 - ELECTROMASTER (とある魔術の禁書目録 Original Soundtrack 1 - ELECTROMASTER) was first released on January 23, 2009, and was published by Geneon.

==== Track listing ====
1. "PSI-missing"
2. "Yochou" (予兆)
3. "Unmei no Hajimari" (運命の始まり)
4. "Overdrive" (オーバードライブ)
5. "Yami he no Iriguchi" (闇への入り口)
6. "Kuukyo" (空虚)
7. "Aseri" (焦り)
8. "Gakuen Toshi" (学園都市)
9. "Nichijou" (日常)
10. "Hurry Up" (ハリーアップ)
11. "Heat Island" (ヒートアイランド)
12. "Odayaka na You" (穏やかな陽)
13. "Hizumi" (歪み)
14. "Idai Naru Chikara" (偉大なる力)
15. "Kashiri" (呪)
16. "Ippou Tsuukou" (一方通行)
17. "Ukabiagaru mono" (浮かび上がるもの)
18. "Renkin Jutsu" (錬金術)
19. "Bousou" (暴走)
20. "Ikari" (怒り)
21. "Majo Kari no Ou" (魔女狩りの王)
22. "Time Limit" (タイムリミット)
23. "Kyuuketsu Koroshi" (吸血殺し)
24. "Ushinawareta mono" (喪われたもの)
25. "Eyecatch" (アイキャッチ)
26. "Rimless ~Fuchinashi no Sekai~" (Rimless～フチナシノセカイ～)

=== Toaru Majutsu no Index Original Soundtrack 2 - Dedicatus545 ===
Toaru Majutsu no Index Original Soundtrack 2 - Dedicatus545

Soundtrack album by Maiko Iuchi
- Released: April 24, 2009
- Genre: Anime soundtrack
- Label: Geneon

The Toaru Majutsu no Index Original Soundtrack 2 - Dedicatus545 (とある魔術の禁書目録 Original Soundtrack 2 - Dedicatus545) was first released on April 24, 2009, and was published by Geneon.

==== Track listing ====
1. "masterpiece"
2. "Konran" (混乱)
3. "Gensou Goroshi" (幻想殺し)
4. "Tachi Mukau Chikara" (立ち向かうチカラ)
5. "Natsu no Hizashi" (夏の日差し)
6. "Itsumo no Nakama to" (いつもの仲間と)
7. "Onakasuita" (おなかすいた)
8. "Index" (インデックス)
9. "Tsuugakuro" (通学路)
10. "Funny Days" (ファニー・デイズ)
11. "「Chou Kidou Shoujo Kanamin」no Teema" (「超機動少女カナミン」のテーマ)
12. "Ojou-sama no Nichijou" (お嬢様の日常)
13. "Kyosuu Gakku Gogyuu Kikan" (虚数学区・五行機関)
14. "Zetsubou" (絶望)
15. "Shousou" (焦燥)
16. "Gyakuten" (逆転)
17. "Negatta Mono" (願ったもの)
18. "Ningen de ha nai Mono" (ニンゲンデハナイモノ)
19. "Majutsu Kessha" (魔術結社)
20. "Yami no Naka" (闇の中)
21. "Hikari no Seijaku" (光の静寂)
22. "Breakthrough" (ブレイクスルー)
23. "Kokoro ni" (心に)
24. "Sorezore no Omoi" (それぞれの想い)
25. "Yasashii Ketsumatsu" (優しい結末)
26. "Hikari no Hane" (光の羽)
27. "Torimodosenai Mono" (取り戻せないもの)
28. "Soshite Futatabi" (そして再び)
29. "Chikaigoto ~Sukoshi Dake Mou Ichido~" (誓い言～スコシだけもう一度～)

=== Toaru Majutsu no Index II Original Soundtrack 1 ===
Toaru Majutsu no Index II Original Soundtrack 1

Soundtrack album by Maiko Iuchi
- Released: January 26, 2011
- Genre: Anime soundtrack
- Label: Geneon

The Toaru Majutsu no Index II Original Soundtrack 1 (とある魔術の禁書目録 II Original Soundtrack 1) was first released on January 26, 2011, and was published by Geneon.

==== Track listing ====
1. "No buts!"
2. "Fanatical" (ファナティック)
3. "Kyuushuu" (急襲)
4. "Tsuisou" (追走)
5. "To Aru Nichijou no Koukei" (とある日常の光景)
6. "Itan Shinmon" (異端審問)
7. "Semaru Kage" (迫る影)
8. "Saikyou no Nanori" (最強の名乗り)
9. "Konmei" (混迷)
10. "Psychic Battle" (サイキックバトル)
11. "Boukyaku no Hibi" (忘却の日々)
12. "Jigoujitoku?" (自業自得?)
13. "Tea Time" (ティータイム)
14. "Sakubou" (策謀)
15. "Sokki Genten" (速記原典)
16. "Madousho" (魔道書)
17. "Uchidome to Ippoutsuukou" (打ち止めと一方通行)
18. "Kyoudai na Chikara" (強大なチカラ)
19. "Cross Speed" (クロススピード)
20. "Junan" (受難)
21. "Honoo ni Yakareru mono" (炎に焼かれるモノ)
22. "Makuai" (幕間)
23. "Magic∞world"
