= Tourists (album) =

Tourist

Studio album by Psapp
- Released: September 3, 2019
- Genre: Electronica
- Length: 43:12
- Label: The state51 Conspiracy

Psapp chronology
| What Makes Us Glow (2013) | Tourist (2019) |

Tourists is the fifth album by electronica band Psapp. It was released on Monday 2 September 2019 through The state51 Conspiracy.

Professional ratings
Review scores
| Source | Rating |
|---|---|
| Narc Magazine | 4/5 |
| Onda Rock | 7.5/10 |

== Track listings ==
| No. | Title | Length |
|---|---|---|
| 1. | "uPVC" | 3:30 |
| 2. | "Progress" | 3:42 |
| 3. | "Tourist" | 3:35 |
| 4. | "Woods" | 0:58 |
| 5. | "Vision" | 3:52 |
| 6. | "Glove" | 4:57 |
| 7. | "Slippery" | 1:02 |
| 8. | "Pieces" | 4:55 |
| 9. | "Land" | 3:49 |
| 10. | "Orekche" | 3:41 |
| 11. | "Work" | 3:44 |
| 12. | "A Fit" | 4:01 |
| 13. | "BIG" | 1:21 |
| Total length: | | 43:12 |

== Personnel ==
Psapp

- Carim Clasmann
- Galia Durant

Additional Personnel

- Shawn Lee - Drums, "uPVC"
- Gwen Cheeseman - Violin, "Vision"
- Anna Katharina Schumann, "Glove"
