= Buttons and War =

Buttons and War EP
- Cover art by Galia Durant

EP by Psapp
- Released: 2004
- Genre: Electronic
- Length: 16:04
- Label: Melodic
- Producers: Carim Clasmann; Galia Durant

Psapp chronology
Rear Moth (2004)	Buttons and War EP (2004)	Tiger, My Friend (2004)

Buttons and War is the third EP released by electronic band Psapp.

== Track listing ==
All tracks are written by Carim Clasmann and Galia Durant.

Side A
No.	Title	Length
1.	"About Fun"	3:42
2.	"Velvet Pony"	3:49

Side B
No.	Title	Length
3.	"Feel the Fur"	3:50
4.	"About Fun" (Isan's Pet Visor Remix)	4:43

== Notes ==
- "About Fun" and "Velvet Pony" were later released on Tiger, My Friend.
- "Feel the Fur" was later released on Early Cats and Tracks Volume 2.
