= Maon Kurosaki =

Japanese singer-songwriter (1988–2023)

Maon Kurosaki 黒崎 真音
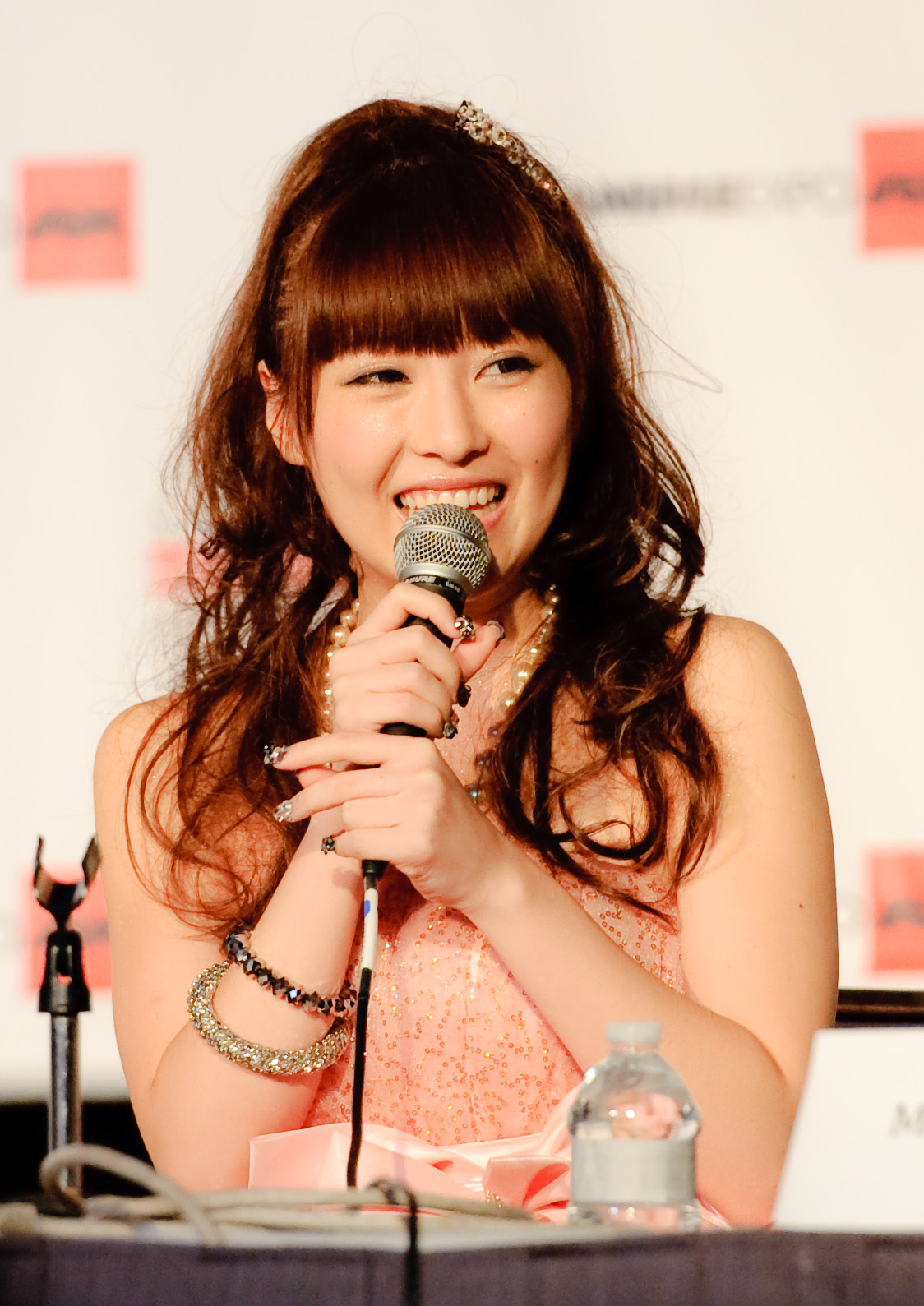
- Kurosaki at Anime Expo 2011 in Los Angeles

Background information
- Born: January 13, 1988; Tokyo, Japan
- Died: February 16, 2023 (aged 35)
- Genres: J-pop; Anison; rock
- Occupations: Singer; songwriter
- Instrument: Vocals
- Years active: 2008–2023
- Label: NBCUniversal Entertainment Japan (2010–2023)
- Formerly of: Altima; Alices
- Website: maonkurosaki.jp

Maon Kurosaki (Japanese: 黒崎 真音, Hepburn: Kurosaki Maon; January 13, 1988 – February 16, 2023) was a Japanese singer and songwriter. After being discovered while working as a performer in Akihabara, Tokyo, she signed to NBCUniversal Entertainment Japan and made her major debut in 2010, performing ending themes to the anime television series Highschool of the Dead. She released her debut album H.O.T.D. in September 2010, which features the ending themes from Highschool of the Dead. Her first two singles were used as ending themes to the anime television series A Certain Magical Index II.

Kurosaki's music was influenced by her love of anime and lolita fashion. Her songs have been featured in various anime series such as Jormungand, Tokyo Ravens, and The Fruit of Grisaia. She collaborated with artists such as Mami Kawada, Kotoko, and Trustrick for her music releases. She performed twice at Anime Expo 2011 in Los Angeles, California, and was a regular performer at Japanese anime events such as LisAni, Animelo Summer Live, and Animax Musix. She also appeared at Anime Festival Asia, Bangkok Comic Con, and CharaExpo. From 2011 to 2016, she was singer of the synthpop band Altima, together with Motsu of the band Move.

On September 18, 2021, Kurosaki collapsed in the middle of a livestreamed concert, which was soon suspended thereafter. She was then rushed to a hospital where she was diagnosed with an epidural hematoma. She died in February 2023 after a period of declining health.

== Early life ==
Kurosaki was born in Tokyo on January 13, 1988. She originally became interested in becoming a performer during her elementary years. During this time, she wanted to become a theater artist, and she participated in an audition in her school during her sixth grade. She did not pass the audition as she lacked talent in performing, but her singing was praised. This event would leave an impression on her, and as her parents were not interested in her taking up performance arts, she decided that she wanted to become a singer.

== Career ==
Kurosaki began her singing career in Akihabara at the performance venue and bar Dear Stage, where she had been singing since at least January 2008. Music producer Akihiro Tomita noticed her singing talent, and he subsequently became her producer when she made her major debut signed to Geneon Universal Entertainment (now NBCUniversal Entertainment Japan). She first announced her major debut to her fans in January 2010. Before she had her major debut, she posed as a gravure model for the cover of Yūsaku Kitano's novel Maid Road Reload sold on April 26, 2010, by ASCII Media Works under their Media Works Bunko imprint.

Kurosaki's first music release was her debut album H.O.T.D. on September 22, 2010, which contains the ending theme songs used in the 2010 anime series Highschool of the Dead. She also made a voice acting cameo during the series' twelfth episode. To commemorate the album and the broadcast of the anime, she performed songs from the album once a week at Dear Stage from July 7 to September 22, 2010. Another event to commemorate the album was held at Animate in Yokohama on October 16, 2010. Kurosaki became the regular host for the Thursday broadcast of the radio program A&G Artist Zone 2h on October 7, 2010; she would host the show until 2011. Her debut single "Magic World" was released on November 24, 2010, and she performed at Dear Stage on that day to commemorate the release. Kurosaki's second single "Memories Last" (メモリーズ・ラスト) was released on March 2, 2011. Both "Magic∞World" and "Memories Last" were used as ending theme songs to the 2010 anime series A Certain Magical Index II.

Kurosaki had her first solo live event titled "Maon Kurosaki Live 2011 Spring: Memories First" on March 4–5, 2011, in Harajuku. She made her North American debut at Anime Expo 2011 in Los Angeles, California where she performed on July 1 and 3. She released the mini-album Goshiki Uta: Immortal Lovers on August 10, 2011, which contains the ending theme songs used in the 2011 original video animation series Hakuōki Sekkaroku. She made her first appearance at Animelo Summer Live on during its 2011 iteration on August 28. Kurosaki released her second studio album Butterfly Effect on November 30, 2011, containing the song "Scars", the ending theme for the ninth episode of Hellsing Ultimate.

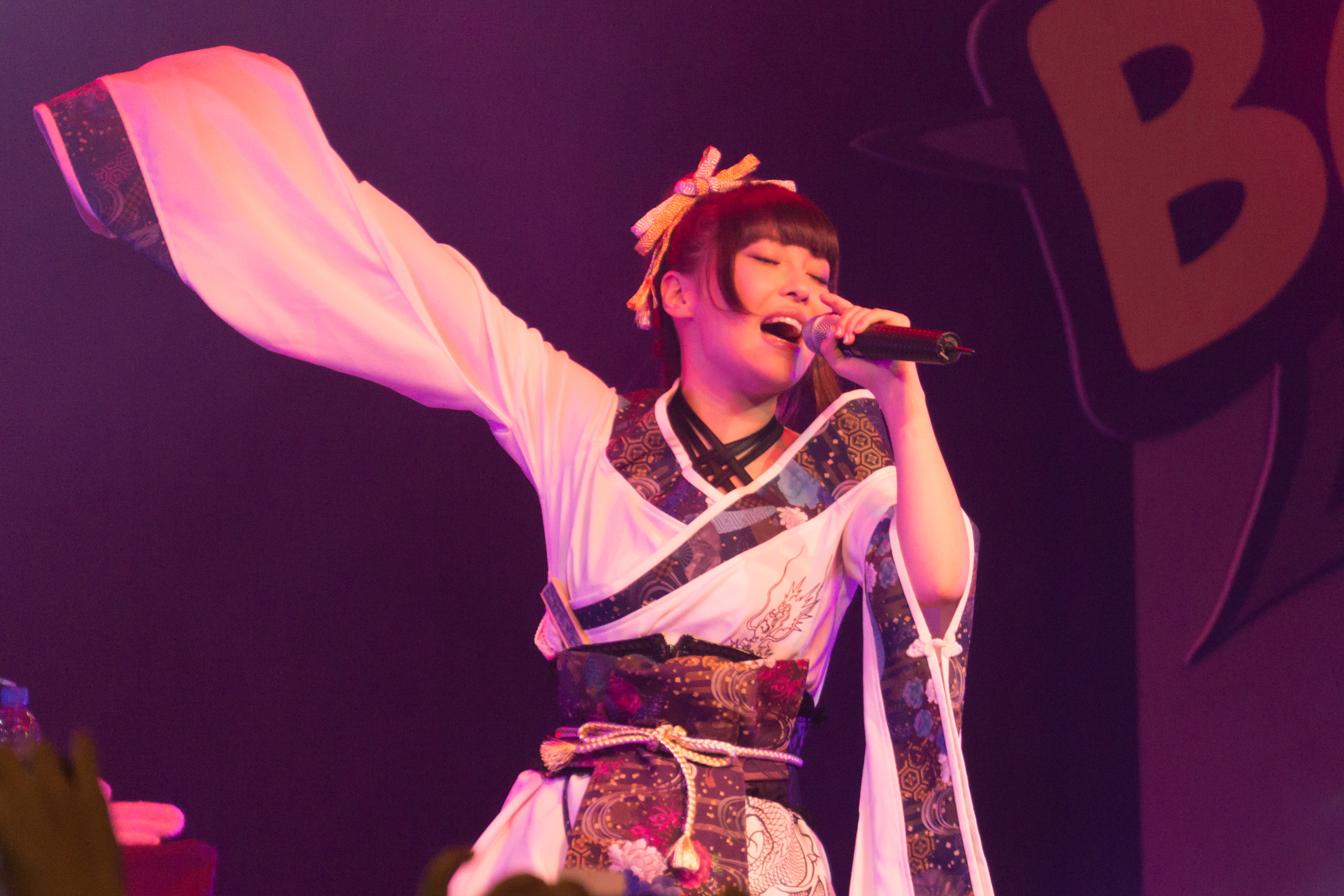
Kurosaki performs at Bangkok Comic Con in 2014

In 2011, Kurosaki formed the band Altima with Move's Mototaka "Motsu" Segawa and fripSide's Satoshi "Sat" Yaginuma. Kurosaki released three more singles in 2012: "Hell:ium" on May 9, "Reimei" (黎鳴) on August 8, and "Under / Shaft" on October 17. "Reimei" is used as the opening theme for the 2012 Hakuōki Reimeiroku anime series, and "Under / Shaft" is used as the opening theme for the 2012 Jormungand: Perfect Order anime series. She was a guest at Anime Festival Asia Malaysia in 2012. Her third studio album Vertical Horizon was released on April 10, 2013. Her single "X-Encounter", released on November 6, 2013, is used as the opening theme for the 2013 Tokyo Ravens anime series. Her fourth studio album Reincarnation was released on July 23, 2014. In July 2014, she attended the Bangkok Comic Con. Her seventh single "Rakuen no Tsubasa" (楽園の翼) was released on October 15, 2014; the song is used as the opening theme for the 2014 The Fruit of Grisaia anime series. Her eighth single "Setsuna no Kajitsu" (刹那の果実) was released on May 13, 2015; the titular track is used as the opening theme for the 2015 Le Eden de la Grisaia anime series. She made an appearance at CharaExpo in Singapore in June 2015.

Kurosaki's ninth single "Harmonize Clover" (ハーモナイズ・クローバー) was released on August 19, 2015. Harmonize Clover, along with "Afterglow" (アフターグロウ) from the same single, are both used as ending themes for the 2015 anime series School-Live!. She released her fifth studio album Mystical Flowers on November 25, 2015. As part of Altima, she collaborated with musician Kotoko in performing the song "Plasmic Fire", which was used as the theme song to the 2016 anime film Accel World: Infinite Burst. In 2016, Kurosaki played the role of Alisa Reinford in the premium 3D musical adaptation of The Legend of Heroes: Trails of Cold Steel. During the Animelo Summer Live event in August 2016, Altima announced a hiatus from music activities. She released her tenth single "Dead or Lie" on August 17, 2016, featuring the duo Trustrick; the song is used as the opening theme for the 2016 anime series Danganronpa 3: The End of Kibougamine Gakuen: Mirai-hen. Her 11th single "Vermillion" was released on November 23, 2016; the song is used as the ending theme for the 2016 anime series Drifters. Her tenth single "Last Desire" was released on March 22, 2017; the title track is used as an opening theme to the 2016 anime television series Rewrite, while the single's B-side track "Ignis Memory" is used as the theme song to the game Rewrite IgnisMemoria. Later that year, she released a compilation album titled Maon Kurosaki Best Album: M.A.O.N.

Kurosaki's eleventh single "Decadence" was released on May 9, 2018; the title track is used as the ending theme to the anime series Dances with the Dragons. Her twelfth single "Gravitation" was released on November 20, 2018; the title song will be used as the opening theme to the anime series A Certain Magical Index III. She made her live-action acting debut in both 2018 and 2020 live-action films for Blood-C anime, Blood-Club Dolls 1 and Blood-Club Dolls 2; she also performed the first film's theme song "Hazy Moon". Her thirteenth single "Roar" was released on March 6, 2019; the title track is used as the second opening theme to A Certain Magical Index III. Her fourteenth single "Gensō no Rondo" (幻想の輪舞) was released on March 13, 2019; the title song is used as the opening theme to the anime film Grisaia: Phantom Trigger The Animation. She released her sixth album Beloved One on June 19, 2019. She later formed the unit ALICes with Sayaka Kanda; the two released the song "Icy Voyage" in November 2020.

In 2021, Kurosaki went on a temporary hiatus after collapsing during an online live concert and being diagnosed with an epidural hematoma. She released the single "More Strongly" on November 16, 2022; the title song was used as the ending theme to the anime series Reincarnated as a Sword.

== Musical style and influences ==
Kurosaki was a long-time fan of anime and video games, and these two interests have influenced her throughout her career. She was a fan of the band Evanescence, and her first lyrics were inspired by the band's songs. She was also influenced the song "Powder Snow" by Ayumi Hamasaki. When writing lyrics for theme songs for anime, she would first read the anime's source material, then she would write lyrics based on the series' themes and setting.

In an interview during her North American debut in 2011, Kurosaki mentioned that it had been her long-time dream to perform theme songs for anime series, and that anime was a big part of her life. She related her experiences working at Dear Stage, where originally worked as a waitress and performer. She said that she worked hard to meet customer expectations, and that performing at the venue's stage would prove to be a valuable experience as it would allow her to perform at larger stages with more imagination and inspiration. She mentioned that while writing lyrics for anime series, she wants the tone and mood of her songs to match the anime's setting.

In an interview with Animate, Kurosaki related her experiences in writing the song "Memories Last". She mentioned how, after reading the A Certain Magical Index books, she sympathized with the character Accelerator and imagined his feelings as she wrote the song. She describes Accelerator is a character who initially has a lonely personality but gains kindness after meeting the character Last Order, and she wrote the song's lyrics based on his personality. She describes the song as an emotional song, and she originally sang it with a little pain.

In an interview with Misako Aoki in 2015, Kurosaki discussed the influence of lolita fashion on her work. Her life changed when she encountered lolita fashion, and modeling in the style would broaden her world and give her a sense of comfort. Kurosaki was inspired by the film Legally Blonde because of the film's main character always wearing what she wants to wear, and how the main character's bedroom is colored pastel pink, a color scheme that Kurosaki liked.

Kurosaki collaborated with musical duo Trustrick in performing the song "Dead or Lie". In an interview with Diga Online, Kurosaki mentioned how she had been a fan of the Danganronpa series and was surprised to learn that she had been chosen to perform a song for the series. She compared her duet with Trustrick's vocalist Sayaka Kanda to an angel and a demon, with her voice being compared to a demon, and Kanda's voice being transparent and feminine like an angel. It was her first time writing lyrics for a duet, and she had to consider the roles of Kanda and Trustrick's guitarist Billy in the song.

== Death and legacy ==
Kurosaki died on February 16, 2023, following a period of declining health, after being diagnosed with an epidural hematoma in 2021.

On September 22, 2023, the day Kurosaki had debuted, a memorial event had been held with the name Maon Kurosaki Memorial Days Event "Future & Past", at Shirokane Takanawa Selene.

On September 30, 2023, a crowdfunding project was launched by Art One Entertainment to finish the documentary Maon Kurosaki: The Movie "If You Become Me That Day", which was scheduled to be released in Q2 2023, but was left in a state of uncertainty after Kurosaki's death. The documentary was aiming to follow the artist's path from the collapse in 2021, to the reemergence with the live event on July 31, 2022. To provide an insight into the film, a trailer was also released with the crowdfunding announcement, which was originally suggested by Kurosaki herself during a production meeting for the documentary. The film ultimately received a theatrical release in Japan in 2024. A tribute album titled Memories Last (黒崎真音メモリアルアルバム MEMORIES LAST), which featured covers of her songs, was released on September 22, 2026.

== Discography ==
=== Studio albums ===
List of albums, with selected chart positions
Title	Album details	Peak positions
Title	Album details	JPN
H.O.T.D.	Released: September 22, 2010 (JPN); Label: Geneon; Formats: CD, digital download; Image album	25
Butterfly Effect	Released: November 30, 2011 (JPN); Label: Geneon; Formats: CD, CD/DVD, digital download	43
Vertical Horizon	Released: April 10, 2013 (JPN); Label: Geneon; Formats: CD, CD/Blu-ray, digital download	25
Reincarnation	Released: July 23, 2014 (JPN); Label: NBCUniversal Entertainment Japan; Formats: CD, CD/DVD, CD/Blu-ray, digital download; Tribute album	21
Mystical Flowers	Released: November 25, 2015 (JPN); Label: NBCUniversal Entertainment Japan; Formats: CD, CD/Blu-ray, digital download	27
Beloved One	Released: June 19, 2019 (JPN); Label: NBCUniversal Entertainment Japan; Formats: CD, CD/Blu-ray, digital download	24

=== Best albums ===
List of albums, with selected chart positions
Title	Album details	Peak positions
Title	Album details	JPN
Maon Kurosaki Best Album –M.A.O.N-	Released: September 27, 2017 (JPN); Label: NBCUniversal Entertainment Japan; Formats: CD, CD/Blu-ray, digital download	21

=== Extended play ===
List of extended plays, with selected chart positions
Title	Album details	Peak positions
Title	Album details	JPN
Goshiki Uta: Immortal Lovers (五色詠; "Five Color Songs")	Released: August 10, 2011 (JPN); Label: Geneon; Formats: CD, digital download; Image album	51

=== Singles ===
Title	Year	Peak chart positions		Album
Title	Year	JPN Oricon	JPN Hot 100 (Note: Sources for chart positions are as follows: "Memories Last", "X-Encounter", "Rakuen no Tsubasa", "Setsuna no Kajitsu", "Harmonize Clover", "Dead Or Lie", "Vermillion".)	Album
"Magic∞World"	2010	20	— (Note: Charted at number 20 on the Hot Singles Sales chart.)	Butterfly Effect
"Memories Last" (メモリーズ・ラスト, Memorīzu Rasuto)	2011	14	60	Butterfly Effect
Hell:ium (Note: Triple A-side single featuring the songs "Narihibiita Kodō no Naka de, Boku wa Seijaku o Kiku", "I'm Still Breathing" and "Just Believe".)	2012	61	— (Note: Charted at number 63 on the Hot Singles Sales chart.)	Vertical Horizon
"Reimei" (黎鳴-reimei-; "Dark Dawn")	2012	40	— (Note: Charted at number 37 on the Hot Singles Sales chart.)	Vertical Horizon
"Under/Shaft"	2012	36	— (Note: Charted at number 32 on the Hot Singles Sales chart.)	Vertical Horizon
"X-Encounter"	2013	13	22	Reincarnation
"Rakuen no Tsubasa" (楽園の翼; "Paradise Wings")	2014	16	27	Mystical Flowers
"Setsuna no Kajitsu" (刹那の果実; "Fruit of a Moment")	2015	21	21	Mystical Flowers
"Harmonize Clover" (ハーモナイズ・クローバー)	2015	36	62	Mystical Flowers
"Dead or Lie"	2016	27	25	Maon Kurosaki Best Album –M.A.O.N-
"Vermillion"	2016	44	64	Maon Kurosaki Best Album –M.A.O.N-
"Last Desire"	2017	29	—	Non-album single
"Decadence"	2018	39	—	Beloved One
"Gravitation"	2018	29	—	Beloved One
"Roar"	2019	32	—	Beloved One
"Gensō no Rondo" (幻想の輪舞)	2019	39	—	Beloved One
"Kimi o Sukueru nara Boku wa Nani ni demo Naru" (君を救えるなら僕は何にでもなる)	2020	34	—	Non-album singles
"Junction"	2021	—	—	Non-album singles
"Shunshuei -Beautiful world-" (春愁詠-Beautiful world-)	2021	110	—	Non-album singles
"More＜Strongly"	2022	65	—	Non-album singles

=== Other album appearances ===
Year	Song	Album	Notes	Ref.
2010	"Kimi to Taiyō ga Shinda Hi"	Highschool of the Dead Original Soundtrack	Short version theme song to Highschool of the Dead anime television series.	
2011	"Magic∞World"	A Certain Magical Index II O.S.T 1	Short version theme song to A Certain Magical Index II anime television series.	
2011	"Memories Last"	A Certain Magical Index II O.S.T 2	Short version theme song to A Certain Magical Index II anime television series.	
2013	"Snap out of it!!"	Toaru Majutsu no TV Songs	Sung with Mami Kawada.	

== Filmography ==
Year	Title	Role	Ref.
2018	Blood-Club Dolls 1	Michiru Arisugawa	
2020	Blood-Club Dolls 2	Michiru Arisugawa	
