= Rear Moth =

Rear Moth EP
- Cover art by Galia Durant

EP by Psapp
- Released: 2004
- Genre: Electronica
- Length: 12:28
- Label: Wiaiwya
- Producers: Galia Durant; Carim Clasmann

Psapp chronology
Northdown (2004)	Rear Moth EP (2004)	Buttons and War EP (2004)

Rear Moth is the second EP released by electronica duo Psapp.

== Track listing ==
All tracks are written by Carim Clasmann and Galia Durant.

No.	Title	Length
1.	"Grand Opening"	3:48
2.	"Do Something Wrong"	3:08
3.	"Whores"	2:26
4.	"Your Game"	3:06

== Personnel ==
Psapp

- Carim Clasmann
- Galia Durant

Additional personnel

- Shawn Lee - vocals, "Grand Opening"

== Notes ==
- "Grand Opening" and "Do Something Wrong" were later released on Early Cats and Tracks.
- "Whores" was later released on Early Cats and Tracks Volume 2.
- A song entitled "Rear Moth" would appear later in 2004 on Psapp's Tiger, My Friend.
