= Psapp =

British experimental electronica band

- Origin: London, England
- Genres: Electronic, indie pop
- Years active: 2002–present
- Labels: Melodic, Rallye, Wiaiwya, Arable, Leaf, Domino Records, The state51 Conspiracy
- Members: Galia Durant; Carim Clasmann

Psapp (/ˈsæp/) is a British experimental electronic music duo. The duo consists of Carim Clasmann and Galia Durant and are sometimes credited with inventing a musical style known as "toytronica", a form of electronic music made with toys and toy instruments. They are also noted for their use of found sounds and homemade instruments, including the meowing of live cats, a "mechanical chicken", and a xylophone-like instrument made of bones they call the "boneaphone". They have released five albums, a Japan exclusive mini-album, Northdown, and five EPs.

Psapp composed the song "Cosy in the Rocket", the main theme on the medical-drama TV series Grey's Anatomy, for which they have received multiple BMI awards. Some of their other songs have been used in other American TV shows such as The OC and Nip/Tuck as well as the UK Channel 4 TV show Sugar Rush.

In 2015 they were chosen by David Byrne to play at the Meltdown Festival in London.

Psapp's fourth album, What Makes Us Glow, was released on 11 November 2013, and their fifth album Tourists, was released on 2 September 2019, both under the label The state51 Conspiracy.

Psapp are known for their humour on stage, throwing toy cats (hand-made by the band) into the audience.

== Discography ==
=== Albums ===
- Tiger, My Friend (2004)
- The Only Thing I Ever Wanted (2006)
- The Camel's Back (2008)
- What Makes Us Glow (2013)
- Tourists (2019)

=== EPs ===
- Do Something Wrong (2003)
- Rear Moth (2004)
- Buttons and War (2004)
- Early Cats and Tracks (2005)
- Hi (2006)
- Early Cats and Tracks Volume 2 (2009)

=== Singles ===
- "Tricycle" (2006)
- "The Monster Song" (2008)
- "I Want That" (2009)
- "Wet Salt" (2013)

=== Compilation and soundtrack appearances ===
- Tracks for Horses (2003) - "Difficult Key"
- Indoor Shed (2003) - "Scissory"
- Northdown (2004)
- Grey's Anatomy Soundtrack (2005) - "Cosy in the Rocket"
- Merry Mixmas (2005) - "I've Got My Love to Keep Me Warm"
- Rewind! 5 (2006) - "Ev'rybody Wants to Be a Cat"
- Take It Easy: 15 Soft Rock Anthems (2006) - "Year of the Cat" (cover of Al Stewart song)
- David Shrigley's Worried Noodles (2007) - "Sad Song"
- Hallam Foe Soundtrack (2007) - "Tricycle" and "Eating Spiders"
- Verve Remixed, Vol. 4 (2008) - "Bim Bom"
