= Northdown (album) =

Studio album by Psapp
- Released: March 1, 2004
- Genre: Electronica
- Length: 30:23
- Label: Rallye label
- Producer: Carim Clasmann; Galia Durant

Psapp chronology
Do Something Wrong EP (2003)	Northdown (2004)	Rear Moth (2004)

Northdown is a mini album released by electronica band Psapp exclusively in Japan. Three of its tracks are exclusive to this album ("Side Dish" and "Dirt Is Falling" were later released on Early Cats and Tracks, "Curuncula" was later released as "Caruncula" on Tiger, My Friend, and "Happy Lamb" was later released on Early Cats and Tracks Volume 2).

== Track listing ==
All tracks are written by Psapp at Fishtank Studios, King's Cross, London, except where noted.

No.	Title	Length
1.	"Curuncula"	6:19
2.	"Kevin Paccashio" (Psapp, Shawn Lee)	5:35
3.	"Happy Lamb"	3:53
4.	"Glomb"	3:33
5.	"Ice Weasel"	4:07
6.	"Side Dish"	3:21
7.	"Dirt Is Falling"	3:35

== Personnel ==
Psapp

- Carim Clasmann
- Galia Durant

Additional personnel

- Mark Glover - clarinet, "Dirt Is Falling"

== Notes ==
- To date, Northdown's package art is the only to feature elements not created by Durant, though her drawings are incorporated into the design by Japan's marc graphic. The theme is outmoded technology, perhaps as a comment on Psapp's reputation for using both old and new technology to create their music. Besides the portable television shown above, the packaging includes photographs of:
  - A reel-to-reel audio tape recorder on the back of the tray card insert
  - A tape reel on the CD label
  - A pocket calculator beneath the clear plastic CD tray
  - A computer with integrated monitor and drives, similar to the Casio FX-9000P or TRS 80, on the back of the booklet
