= What Makes Us Glow =

- Cover art by Galia Durant

Studio album by Psapp
- Released: 11 November 2013
- Genre: Electronica
- Length: 39:20
- Label: The state51 Conspiracy
- Producer: Carim Clasmann; Galia Durant

Psapp chronology
The Camel's Back (2008)	What Makes Us Glow (2013)	Tourists (2019)

What Makes Us Glow is the fourth album by electronica band Psapp. On Monday 16 September 2013, Psapp announced that the album would be released on 11 November through The state51 Conspiracy.

== Track listing ==
All tracks are written by Psapp, London.

What Makes Us Glow track listing
No.	Title	Length
1.	"Life Hums"	0:17
2.	"Wet Salt"	3:24
3.	"The Cruel, the Kind and the Bad"	3:43
4.	"Seven"	3:42
5.	"That's the Spirit"	2:54
6.	"In the Black"	3:52
7.	"Everything Belongs to the Sun"	4:01
8.	"Bone Marrow"	2:44
9.	"Your Hot Knife"	3:47
10.	"The Well and the Wall"	3:28
11.	"What Makes Us Glow"	4:06
12.	"In and Out"	3:22

Deluxe edition
No.	Title	Length
13.	"Smallest War"	3:24
14.	"A Pillow"	4:09

== Personnel ==
Psapp

- Carim Clasmann
- Galia Durant
