= Music of the Danganronpa series =

Music of the Danganronpa video game franchise

Danganronpa discography
- English series logo
- EPs: 1
- Soundtrack albums: 7
- Singles: 6
- B-sides: 7
- Music videos: 2
- Remix albums: 4
- Mini albums: 7

Danganronpa is an adventure visual novel video game franchise created by Spike Chunsoft (previously Spike). The series follows groups of high school students who are trapped in an enclosed area, with the only way to escape being to murder a fellow student and not be caught in a subsequent investigation and trial. The music of Danganronpa comprises seven soundtrack albums, as well as numerous singles, mini albums, and other music releases. The main composer for the series is Masafumi Takada, who has composed for all of the series' soundtracks and has also released many of them on his label, Sound Prestige Records. Takada has been aided with the franchise's music by various artists, including other composers, lyricists, and singers.

The series has spanned a variety of different musical genres and styles, prominently electronic, jazz, and rock. The soundtracks have had a key focus to fit the settings, situations, and overall atmosphere of Danganronpa. This attempt at ambience has been enjoyed by music critics, who have also praised the series' many types of musical style. Several of the series' music releases have appeared on Oricon's Albums and Singles Charts, nation-wide music charts in Japan.

== Composition and themes ==
To give you a quick look at my thought process: Exploration music should burn itself into your brain. Trial music emphasizes rhythms, with voice samples to build the hype. Characters themes should each have some unique hook, sometimes I play around with voices samples.

— Takada on his thought process while composing music for Danganronpa, in an interview with Video Game Music Online.

While composing for the series, Masafumi Takada has aimed to make the soundtracks fit the different settings of Danganronpa, such as attempting to convey a claustrophobic atmosphere in Danganronpa: Trigger Happy Havoc, or a sense of freedom in Danganronpa 2: Goodbye Despair. According to Takada, he is helped in composing songs through specifications given to him by director Takayuki Sugawara and visual materials sent to him by series creator Kazutaka Kodaka. Takada has also said that he tries to conform the music to Danganronpa's "psycho-pop" style, a term coined by Kodaka meaning gruesome horror with a pop "flair".

The series has spanned across a variety of different genres, most primarily electronic, with frequent use of synthesizers, though other genres have also been featured, such as jazz (and avant-garde jazz), rock, trip hop, and chiptune. The series take frequent use of voice samples, commonly in character and trial themes, in an attempt to create hooks and to form momentum to help build players' hype. The titular theme of the franchise, "Danganronpa" (localized in the West as "Trigger Happy Havoc"), is an electronic and jazz track that is often reused, rearranged, and sampled throughout the franchise. The theme features a short audio line saying "Danganronpa" that was added by Takada after hearing a text-to-speech voice read it out to him, which Takada stated gave him goosebumps. The franchise also features multiple series of tracks, such as the "Beautiful" tracks, which play primarily during exploration, or the frequently lyrical "Punishment" songs.

== Soundtrack albums ==
=== Danganronpa: Trigger Happy Havoc Original Soundtrack ===
Danganronpa: Trigger Happy Havoc Original Soundtrack

Soundtrack album by Masafumi Takada
- Released: February 14, 2011
- Genre: Video game music; electronic; jazz; ambient; rock
- Length: 2:28:03
- Label: Sound Prestige Records

The soundtrack of the series' first game, Danganronpa: Trigger Happy Havoc, was released by Sound Prestige Records in Japan on February 11, 2011, with a condensed version published for music streaming services, such as iTunes. The soundtrack was headed by Masafumi Takada and spans 63 tracks across 2 discs, with a total length of 2:28:03. The first disc and the beginning half of the second consists of tracks from Trigger Happy Havoc, with the remainder of disc two being made up of sound effects from the game, as well as the ending theme "Rebirth, Rebuild", performed by Megumi Ogata and composed by Satoshi Iwase.

Trigger Happy Havoc followed Masafumi Takada's work on the third-person shooter game Vanquish and was his first major solo project since leaving the game development company Grasshopper Manufacture. For Trigger Happy Havoc, Takada wanted to convey a claustrophobic and mysterious atmosphere, which he attempted through the use of combinations of varying tones and phrases, as well as sudden melodies.

The soundtrack managed to reach No. 159 on the Oricon Albums Chart upon release and stayed on the chart for two weeks. The soundtrack was enjoyed by video game music critics; both Video Game Music Online's Don Kotowski and RPGFan's Patrick Gann praised the soundtrack for its stylistic diversity. Both reviewers described it as electronic and jazzy, with Kotowski also noting elements of rock, trip hop, pop, and ambient music in certain tracks. Gann complimented the soundtrack for its fitting use in-game, saying that it matches the "odd" artstyle of Danganronpa. While admitting to not being fully familiar with the game, Kotowski also praised the soundtrack's soundscape and said that it varies from track to track, describing one track as "liberating" and three others as "futuristic". Gann and Kotowski agreed that the soundtrack spans a wide array of tones: they both described "Mr. Monokuma's Lesson" as a more light track, positively contrasting to the action-oriented trial themes, which Kotowski called reminiscent to the sound of Vanquish. Ultimately, both reviewers recommended the soundtrack, with Gann calling Takada the perfect composer for Danganronpa and Kotowski saying that Trigger Happy Havoc illustrates Takada's "diversity as a composer".

All tracks are written by Masafumi Takada, unless otherwise noted.

CD release - Disc 1
No.	Title	Japanese title (romanization)	Length
1.	"Trigger Happy Havoc"	DANGANRONPA	1:36
2.	"Danganronpa!"	だんがんろんぱ! (Danganronpa!)	2:13
3.	"Punishment Rocket"	おしおきロケット (Oshioki Roketto)	0:55
4.	"Beautiful Day"	Beautiful Days	4:03
5.	"Beautiful Death"	Beautiful Dead	5:36
6.	"Class Trial (Dawn)"	学級裁判黎明編 (Gakkyū Saiban Reimei-hen)	6:13
7.	"Mr. Monokuma After Class"	モノクマ先生の課外授業 (Monokuma-sensei no Kagaijugyō)	2:49
8.	"Box 15"	BOX 15	4:05
9.	"100 Mile Junk Food Dash"	疾走する青春のジャンクフード (Shissō Suru Seishun no Jankufūdo)	4:17
10.	"Distrust"	DISTRUST	3:17
11.	"The 1,000 Blows"	千本ノック (Senbon Nokku)	1:35
12.	"Death Wish"	処刑に願いを... (Shokei ni Negai o...)	3:41
13.	"To Survive"	イキキル (Ikikiru)	4:22
14.	"The Cage of Death"	猛太亜最苦婁弟酢華恵慈 (Mōfutoasaikuru Desu Kēji)	1:13
15.	"Underground Trial"	開廷アンダーグラウンド (Kaitei Andāguraundo)	1:48
16.	"BTB"	M.T.B.	1:48
17.	"Argument [Break]"	議論 -BREAK- (Giron -BREAK-)	3:56
18.	"Despair Pollution Noise Music"	絶望汚染ノイズミュージック (Zetsubō Osen Noizumyūjikku)	0:10
19.	"Despair Syndrome (2)"	絶望症候群 (Zetsubō Shōkōgun)	3:19
20.	"The Burning of the Versailles Witch"	ベルサイユ産火あぶり魔女狩り仕立て (Berusaiyu-san Hiaburi Majogari Shitate)	1:33
21.	"Boys' Life of Despair"	週刊少年ゼツボウマガジン (Shūkan Shōnen Zetsubō Magajin)	2:52
22.	"Super BTB"	SUPER M.T.B.	2:29
23.	"Welcome to Despair"	ようこそ絶望学園 (Yōkoso Zetsubō Gakuen)	2:59
24.	"Master of Shovel"	ショベルの達人 (Shoberu no Tatsujin)	0:47
25.	"Extra Lessons for the Unlucky"	補習 for 不運 (Hoshū for Fuun)	1:44
26.	"Beautiful Morning"	Beautiful Morning	3:47
27.	"Closing Argument"	クライマックス推理 (Kuraimakkusu Suiri)	4:09

CD release - Disc 2
No.	Title	Japanese title (romanization)	Length
1.	"Trigger Happy Havoc (DR Version)"	DANGANRONPA (DR Version)	2:51
2.	"Momomomonokuma!"	モモモモノクマ! (Momomomonokuma!)	0:15
3.	"Mr. Monokuma's Lesson"	モノクマ先生の授業 (Monokuma-sensei no Jugyō)	3:45
4.	"Despair Syndrome (1)"	ゼツボウシンドローム (Zetsubō Shindorōmu)	3:46
5.	"Super Final BTB"	SUPER FINAL M.T.B.	2:09
6.	"Box 16"	BOX 16	5:32
7.	"Argument [Mix] (Edge Version)"	議論 -MIX- (EDGE Version) (Giron -MIX- (EDGE Version))	4:32
8.	"Class Trial [Chaos]"	学級裁判乱世編 (Gakkyū Saiban Ransei-hen)	3:53
9.	"Class Trial [The Sun]"	学級裁判太陽編 (Gakkyū Saiban Taiyō-hen)	4:40
10.	"Argument [Turn Up the Heat]"	議論 -HEAT UP- (Giron -HEAT UP-)	4:13
11.	"Hangman's Gambit"	閃きアナグラム (Hirameki Anaguramu)	3:34
12.	"Argument [Hope vs Despair]"	議論 -HOPE VS DESPAIR- (Giron -HOPE VS DESPAIR-)	4:30
13.	"Extra Lessons for the Mysterious"	補習 for ミステリアス (Hoshū for Misuteriasu)	1:23
14.	"All Star Apologies"	オール・オール・アポロジーズ (Āru・Āru・Aporojīzu)	4:37
15.	"Super High-School Level Despair-inducing Punishment"	超高校級の絶望的おしおき (Chōkō Kōkyū no Zetsubōteki Oshioki)	1:18
16.	"Climactic Re-enactment"	クライマックス再現 (Kuraimakkusu Saigen)	2:11
17.	"New World Order"	ニュー・ワールド・オーダー (Nyū・Wārudo・Ōdā)	4:44
18.	"Goodbye Despair High School"	さよなら絶望学園 (Sayonara Zetsubō Gakuen)	4:12
19.	"Rebirth, Rebuild" (by Satoshi Iwase, with vocals from Megumi Ogata)	再生-rebuild- (Saisei -rebuild-)	5:03
20.	"Prologue - Credits"	プロローグ・クレジット (Purorōgu・Kurejitto)	0:18
21.	"Chapter 1"	チャプター1 (Chaputā 1)	0:15
22.	"Chapter 2"	チャプター2 (Chaputā 2)	0:15
23.	"Chapter 3"	チャプター3 (Chaputā 3)	0:21
24.	"Chapter 4"	チャプター4 (Chaputā 4)	0:18
25.	"Chapter 5"	チャプター5 (Chaputā 5)	0:18
26.	"Chapter 6"	チャプター6 (Chaputā 6)	0:22
27.	"Your and My Report Card"	あなたと私の通信簿 (Anata to Watashi no Tsūshinbo)	0:07
28.	"Kotodama Get"	コトダマゲット (Kotodama Getto)	0:06
29.	"Present Get"	プレゼントゲット (Purezento Getto)	0:06
30.	"Rare Present Get"	レアプレゼントゲット (Rea Purezento Getto)	0:06
31.	"Mono-Mono Machine!"	モノモノマシーン! (Monomono Mashīn!)	0:06
32.	"Activation - Electronic Student Notebook"	起動・電子生徒手帳 (Kidō・Denshi Seitotenchō)	0:07
33.	"That Person Saw It!"	あの人は見た! (A no Hito wa Mita!)	0:08
34.	"Radio Exercise Ansatsuken"	ラジオ体操暗殺拳 (Rajio Taisō Ansatsu Kobushi)	0:32
35.	"Phase Results"	フェイズリザルト (Feizu Rizaruto)	0:06
36.	"Chapter Results"	チャプターリザルト (Chaputā Rizaruto)	0:07
Total length:			2:28:03

=== Danganronpa 2: Goodbye Despair Original Soundtrack ===
Danganronpa 2: Goodbye Despair Original Soundtrack

Soundtrack album by Masafumi Takada
- Released: August 31, 2012
- Genre: Video game music; electronic; jazz; rock
- Length: 3:19:51
- Label: Sound Prestige Records

A soundtrack album for the series' second game, Danganronpa 2: Goodbye Despair, was announced at a press conference in July 2012. The album was released by Sound Prestige Records on August 31, 2012, in Japan. Alike the first soundtrack, a condensed version was released for streaming services. The 3:19:51-long three-disc soundtrack of 102 tracks was primarily composed by Takada. It includes both new pieces and arrangements of songs from Trigger Happy Havoc, denoted by various affixes. The third disc is composed mostly of sound effects from the game. Some of the tracks were done in collaboration with other artists: Shingo Yasumoto and Jun Fukuda play the guitar on several tracks; the ending theme "Setting Sail, Departure" is composed by Satoshi Iwase and sung by Ogata; "Sending This to You" is performed by Ami Koshimizu as Ibuki Mioda.

With Danganronpa 2, Takada was told by series creator Kazutaka Kodaka to create a "tropical island theme" with the soundtrack, as per the game being set on a resort island. Using this as his base, Takada aimed to simulate the feel of open space, the opposite of what he set out to do with the soundtrack of Trigger Happy Havoc.

The soundtrack peaked at No. 61 on the Oricon Albums Chart and made a total of two appearances on the chart. RPGFan's Patrick Gann criticized some of the soundtrack's new tracks for being "filler", but still enjoyed many others for their atmosphere. Marc Chait of Video Game Music Online's also praised the tracks' ambience, but was also positive towards their engineering and mix. Gann and Chait were both keen to the rearranged tracks. Gann called Takada's task of rearranging his past work impressive and found the arrangements to typically be better than the originals, while still writing that he's "happy to listen to either version". Chait agreed on the superiority of the arrangements and also commented on the familiarity of tracks, but criticized certain remixes for being moreso identical to the Trigger Happy Havoc versions. Gann's review summarized the soundtrack as a better and expanded version of its predecessor, saying that listeners were likely better off only owning the soundtrack of Danganronpa 2. Chait concluded that the soundtrack lives up to Takada's past credits, but condemned the digital download release for discluding many tracks. In 2014, Video Game Music Online gave the soundtrack the award for "Best Score — Western Localisation" at their annual Game Music Awards.

All tracks are written by Masafumi Takada, unless otherwise noted.

CD release - Disc 1
No.	Title	Japanese title (romanization)	Length
1.	"Danganronpa Super Mix" (with Jun Fukuda and Shingo Yasumoto)	DANGANRONPA SUPER MIX	1:39
2.	"Dan-Dan-Danganronpa!"	だんだんだんがんろんぱ! (Danganronpa!)	1:36
3.	"Usamimimimi!"	ウサミミミミ! (Usamimimimi!)	0:19
4.	"I've Come to the Tropics"	南国に来ちゃった	0:14
5.	"Beautiful Ruin (Summer Salt)"	Beautiful Ruin (Summer Salt)	3:47
6.	"Beautiful Days (Piano Arrange)"	Beautiful Days (Piano Arrange)	3:51
7.	"Re: Beautiful Morning"	Re: Beautiful Morning	3:01
8.	"Ms. Monomi's Practice Lesson"	モノミ先生の教育実習 (Monomi-sensei no Kyōikujusshū)	3:18
9.	"Homicide"	イコロシア (Ikoroshia)	4:42
10.	"Re: Boys' Life of Despair"	Re: 週刊少年ゼツボウマガジン (Re: Shūkan Shōnen Zetsubō Magajin)	2:53
11.	"Re: Despair Syndrome (1)"	Re: ゼツボウシンドローム (Re: Zetsubō Shindorōmu)	2:00
12.	"Punishment feat. Hell-icopter"	おしおき feat.フライヘリ (Oshioki feat. Furai Heri)	1:17
13.	"Tropical Despair"	絶望トロピカル (Zetsubō Toropikaru)	3:21
14.	"Re: Mr. Monokuma's Lesson"	Re: モノクマ先生の授業 (Re: Monokuma-sensei no Jugyō)	3:45
15.	"Re: All All Apologies"	Re: オール・オール・アポロジーズ (Re: Āru・Āru・Aporojīzu)	3:02
16.	"3rd Island Theme"	3番目の島テーマ (3-banme no Shima Tēma)	3:28
17.	"Re: Mr. Monokuma's Extracurricular Lesson"	Re: モノクマ先生の課外授業 (Re: Monokuma-sensei no Kagaijukyō)	2:50
18.	"Welcome to Dangan Island!!! (OP Version)"	Welcome DANGAN IsLand!! (OP Version)	1:14
19.	"Re: Underground Trial"	Re: 開廷アンダーグラウンド (Re: Katei Andāguraundo)	1:49
20.	"P.T.A."	P.T.A.	2:14
21.	"Argument [Break] (2nd Mix)"	議論 -BREAK- (2nd Mix) (Giron -BREAK- (2nd Mix))	3:50
22.	"Re: Distrust"	Re: DISTRUST	3:18
23.	"Punishment feat. Puppet Girl"	おしおき feat.パペットガール (Oshioki feat. Papetto Gāru)	1:10
24.	"Class Trial (Turbulent Edition), Volume 2"	学級裁判乱世編 巻の二 (Gakkyū Saiban Ransei-hen Maki no Ni)	3:53
25.	"Re: Desire for Execution..."	Re: 処刑に願いを... (Re: Shokei ni Onegai o...)	3:41
26.	"Class Trial (Dawn Edition), Volume 2"	学級裁判黎明編 巻の二 (Gakkyū Saiban Reimei-hen Maki no Ni)	5:07
27.	"Re: Welcome to Despair Academy"	Re: ようこそ絶望学園 (Re: Yōkoso Zetsubō Gakuen)	1:38
28.	"Re: Climactic Reasoning"	Re: クライマックス推理 (Re: Kuraimakkusu Suiri)	4:09

CD release - Disc 2
No.	Title	Japanese title (romanization)	Length
1.	"Danganronpa (2nd Gig)"	DANGANRONPA (2nd GIG)	2:54
2.	"Momomomonokuma!"	モモモモノクマ! (Momomomonokuma!)	0:16
3.	"Beautiful Ruin"	Beautiful Ruin	4:35
4.	"Rabbit Ears and a Machine Gun"	ウサギの耳と機関銃 (Usagi no Mimi to Kikanjū)	0:43
5.	"Re: Junk Food for a Dashing Youth"	Re: 疾走する青春のジャンクフード (Re: Shussō Suru Seishun no Jankufūdo)	4:20
6.	"Class Trial (Odd Edition)"	学級裁判異形編 (Gakkyū Saiban Igyō-hen)	4:39
7.	"Class Trial (Solar Edition), Volume 2"	学級裁判太陽編 巻の二 (Gakkyū Saiban Taiyō-hen Maki no Ni)	4:41
8.	"Trapped by the Ocean Scent"	磯の香りのデッドエンド (Iso no Kaori no Deddo Endo)	2:02
9.	"Rebuttal [Cross Sword]"	反論 -CROSS SWORD- (Hanron -CROSS SWORD-)	2:51
10.	"Punishment feat. Rocket Panties"	おしおき feat.ロケットパンツ (Oshioki feat. Roketto Panshi)	0:56
11.	"Kill Now"	スグイコロシア (Sugui Koroshia)	2:39
12.	"Class Trial (Future Edition)"	学級裁判未来編 (Gakkyū Saiban Mirai-hen)	2:03
13.	"Argument [Heat Up] (2nd Mix)"	議論 -HEAT UP- (2nd Mix) (Giron -HEAT UP- (2nd Mix))	3:23
14.	"Re: Living to the Fullest"	Re: イキキル (Re: Ikikiru)	4:25
15.	"Anagram.Net"	ANAGRAM.NET	2:26
16.	"Hyper P.T.A."	HYPER P.T.A.	1:49
17.	"Dive Drive"	DIVE DRIVE	3:09
18.	"Justice for Our Prime Suspect!"	ど正義一番星! (Do Seigi Ichi-banboshi!)	1:32
19.	"Punishment feat. the Last Hike"	おしおき feat.ラストハイキング (Oshioki feat. Rasuto Haikingu)	1:25
20.	"Argument [Hope vs Despair] (2nd Mix)"	議論 -HOPE VS DESPAIR- (2nd Mix) (Giron -HOPE VS DESPAIR- (2nd Mix))	3:20
21.	"Hyper Ultra P.T.A."	HYPER ULTRA P.T.A.	1:31
22.	"Welcome Dangan Island!!"	Welcome DANGAN IsLand!!	1:58
23.	"5th Island Theme"	5番目の島テーマ (Go-banme no Shima Tēma)	1:44
24.	"Monokuma Overclocking"	モノクマオーバークロック (Monokuma Ōbākurokku)	0:41
25.	"Alter Ego of the New World"	新世界のアルターエゴ (Shinsekai no Arutāego)	1:41
26.	"Re: Despair Syndrome"	Re: 絶望症候群 (Re: Zetsubō Shōkōgun)	3:20
27.	"Punishment feat. Arcade Rabbit"	おしおき feat.アーケードラビット (Oshioki fet. Ākēdo Rabitto)	1:39
28.	"Re: Climactic Re-enactment"	Re: クライマックス再現 (Re: Kuraimakkusu Saigen)	2:10
29.	"Re: New World Order"	Re: ニュー・ワールド・オーダー (Re: Nyū・Wārudo・Ōdā)	4:45

CD release - Disc 3
No.	Title	Japanese title (romanization)	Length
1.	"Punishment feat. Dangan Island"	おしおき feat.だんがんアイランド (Oshioki feat. Dangan Airando)	1:13
2.	"Love is Survival"	らぶはサバイバル (Rabu wa Sabaibaru)	3:02
3.	"Master Monokuma's Special Class"	モノクマ師父の特別授業 (Monokuma Shifu no Tokubetsu Jugyō)	1:54
4.	"Sending This to You" (with vocals from Ami Koshimizu)	君にも届け (Kimi ni mo Todoke)	2:13
5.	"Welcome, Monobeast"	おいでやすモノケモノ (Oideyasu Monokemono)	0:16
6.	"Kill Command" (with Jun Fukuda)	エコロシア (Ekoroshia)	7:04
7.	"Desperate Mastermind Girl"	絶望的巨娘 (Zetsubō-teki Kyo Musume)	0:39
8.	"Let Us Sing of a Hollow Victory"	歌え、虚ろなるよろこびを (Utae, Utsuro Naru Yorokobi o)	2:21
9.	"Class Trial (Future Edition) [with Intro]"	学級裁判未来編 (イントロあり) (Gakkyū Saiban Mirai-hen (Intoro Ari))	2:21
10.	"Argument [B-side]"	議論 -B side- (Giron -B side-)	3:08
11.	"The Day Before the Future"	未来の前の日 (Mirai no Mae no Hi)	3:10
12.	"Setting Sail, Departure (Short Version)" (by Satoshi Iwase, with vocals from Megumi Ogata)	出航-departure- (Short Version) (Shūkō-departure- (Short Version))	2:27
13.	"Game Start"	GAME START	0:13
14.	"Hope's Breaking Noise Music"	希望断線ノイズミュージック (Kibō Dansen Noizu Myūjikku)	0:14
15.	"Searching the Twilight"	黄昏の探索 (Tasogare no Tansaku)	0:26
16.	"Beautiful Ruin [16-bit]"	Beautiful Ruin (16bit)	1:51
17.	"Homicide [16-bit]"	イコロシア (16bit) (Ikoroshia (16bit))	2:31
18.	"Truth of the Twilight"	黄昏の真相 (Dasogare no Shinsō)	0:20
19.	"All All Apologies [16-bit]"	オール・オール・アポロジーズ (16bit) (Āru・Āru・Aporojīzu (16-bit))	2:52
20.	"Homicide [8-bit Bug]"	エコロシア (8bitbug) (Ikoroshia (8bitbug))	3:39
21.	"Argument [Heat Up] (8-bit)"	議論 -HEAT UP- (8bit) (Giron -HEAT UP- (8bit))	1:31
22.	"Chapter End Prologue"	チャプターエンドPrologue (Chaputā Endo Prologue)	0:22
23.	"Chapter Title 00"	チャプタータイトル00 (Chaputā Taitoru 00)	0:10
24.	"Chapter End 00"	チャプターエンド00 (Chaputā Endo 00)	0:10
25.	"Chapter Title 01 A Part"	チャプタータイトル01 Aパート (Chaputā Taitoru 01 A Pāto)	0:15
26.	"Chapter Title 01 B Part"	チャプタータイトル01 Bパート (Chaputā Taitoru 01 B Pāto)	0:14
27.	"Chapter End 01"	チャプターエンド01 (Chaputā Endo 01)	0:20
28.	"Chapter Title 02 A Part"	チャプタータイトル02 Aパート (Chaputā Taitoru 02 A Pāto)	0:13
29.	"Chapter Title 02 B Part"	チャプタータイトル02 Bパート (Chaputā Taitoru 02 B Pāto)	0:10
30.	"Chapter End 02"	チャプターエンド02 (Chaputā Endo 02)	0:20
31.	"Chapter Title 03 A Part"	チャプタータイトル03 Aパート (Chaputā Taitoru 03 A Pāto)	0:13
32.	"Chapter Title 03 B Part"	チャプタータイトル03 Bパート (Chaputā Taitoru 03 B Pāto)	0:11
33.	"Chapter End 03"	チャプターエンド03 (Chaputā Endo 03)	0:21
34.	"Chapter Title 04 A Part"	チャプタータイトル04 Aパート (Chaputā Taitoru 04 A Pāto)	0:12
35.	"Chapter Title 04 B Part"	チャプタータイトル04 Bパート (Chaputā Taitoru 04 B Pāto)	0:10
36.	"Chapter End 04"	チャプターエンド04 (Chaputā Endo 04)	0:21
37.	"Chapter Title 05 A Part"	チャプタータイトル05 Aパート (Chaputā Taitoru 05 A Pāto)	0:14
38.	"Chapter Title 05 B Part"	チャプタータイトル05 Bパート (Chaputā Taitoru 05 B Pāto)	0:10
39.	"Chapter End 05"	チャプターエンド05 (Chaputā Endo 05)	0:21
40.	"Chapter Title 06"	チャプタータイトル06 (Chaputā Taitoru 06)	0:14
41.	"Chapter End 06"	チャプターエンド06 (Chaputā Endo 06)	0:23
42.	"Received"	モラッチャッタン (Moracchattan)	0:10
43.	"Deceived"	ヤラレチャッタン (Yararechattan)	0:10
44.	"Ranked"	クリアシチャッタン (Kuriashichattan)	0:10
45.	"End of the Twilight"	黄昏の終わり (Tasogare no Owari)	0:09
Total length:			3:19:51

=== Danganronpa: The Animation Original Soundtrack ===
Danganronpa: The Animation Original Soundtrack

Soundtrack album by Masafumi Takada
- Released: August 28, 2013
- Length: 1:42:47
- Label: Geneon Universal Entertainment Japan; Rondo Robe

A two-disc album consisting of music from Danganronpa: The Animation, an anime TV-series adaptation of Trigger Happy Havoc, was released by Geneon Universal Entertainment Japan and its subsidiary, Rondo Robe, on August 28, 2013. On the Oricon Albums Chart, the soundtrack appeared exclusively during the week of September 9, 2013, at No. 199.

The soundtrack consists mainly of tracks from the Trigger Happy Havoc video game, as executives Seiji Kishi and Yuji Higa had wanted the show's music to preserve Danganronpa's game-like atmosphere. The album also features the opening and ending themes and two character songs from the anime. The opening, "Never Say Never", is an English-language hip hop rendition of the main Danganronpa theme, written by TKDz2b and performed by American rap duo The 49ers, with backing vocals from British vocalist Natalie Oliveri. The ending theme, "Zetsubōsei: Hero Chiryōyaku", is an electronic rock theme that is written by composer and arranger Suzumu and is sung by Soraru, an artist known for his Vocaloid activities. "Zetsubōsei: Hero Chiryōyaku" was also released as a separate single. The two character songs are "Negaigoto Ensemble", sung by Makiko Ohmoto as Sayaka Maizono, and "Monokuma Ondo", sung by Nobuyo Ōyama as series antagonist Monokuma.

All tracks are written by Masafumi Takada, unless otherwise noted.

Disc 1
No.	Title	Japanese title	Length
1.	"Danganronpa The Animation"	DANGANRONPA The Animation	1:03
2.	"High-Speed Butsuri Action"	ハイスピード物理アクション	2:06
3.	"Momomomonokuma The Animation"	モモモモノクマ The Animation	0:22
4.	"Oshioki Rocket"	おしおきロケット	0:55
5.	"Chimidoro Fever"	チミドロフィーバー	1:56
6.	"Beautiful Days The Animation"	Beautiful Days The Animation	2:11
7.	"Monokuma-sensei no Jugyō"	モノクマ先生の授業	3:46
8.	"Laundry de Rendez-vous"	ランドリーでランデヴー	1:33
9.	"Hotel Kibōgamine"	HOTEL希望ヶ峰	2:04
10.	"Kibō Teki Kansoku 78 Seiun"	希望的観測78星雲	2:13
11.	"Zetsubō Eden"	絶望EDEN	2:19
12.	"Beautiful Dead The Animation"	Beautiful Dead The Animation	2:32
13.	"Nichijō no Seishi Suru Hi"	日常の静止する日	2:05
14.	"Kokoro no Riron"	ココロノリロン	2:15
15.	"Box 15 The Animation"	BOX 15 The Animation	2:18
16.	"Ikikiru The Animation"	イキキル The Animation	1:55
17.	"Monokuma Kara no Dōki X"	モノクマからの動機X	2:16
18.	"Yonimo Zetsubō na Monogatari"	世にも絶望な物語	2:11
19.	"Electric Boy Meets Metal Girl"	エレキボーイ・ミーツ・メタルガール	2:00
20.	"Zetsubō Shōkōgun The Animation"	絶望症候群 The Animation	3:02
21.	"Distruct"	DISTRUCT	1:52
22.	"Versailles San Hiaburi Majogari Jitate"	ベルサイユ産火あぶり魔女狩り仕立て	1:34
23.	"Yōkoso Zetsubō Gakuen The Animation"	ようこそ絶望学園 The Animation	1:58
24.	"Negaigoto Ensemble The Animation" (with vocals from Makiko Ohmoto)	ネガイゴトアンサンブル The Animation	3:17

Disc 2
No.	Title	Japanese title	Length
1.	"Never Say Never The Animation" (lyrics by The 49ers and vocals from TKDz2b)	Never Say Never The Animation	1:30
2.	"I Want Tune"	I Want Tune	1:36
3.	"Chō Kōkōgyū to Hito wa Yobu!"	超高校級と人は呼ぶ!	2:24
4.	"Hirameki Angagram The Animation"	閃きアナグラム The Animation	1:43
5.	"Super M.T.B. The Animation"	SUPER M.T.B.The Animation	2:12
6.	"Super Final M.T.B. The Animation"	SUPER FINAL M.T.B.The Animation	2:00
7.	"All All Apologies The Animation"	オール・オール・アポロジーズ The Animation	1:42
8.	"You Great Guitar (Yūgure to Gitā)"	YOU GREAT GUITAR (夕暮れとギター)	1:42
9.	"Dangan in the Dark"	Dangan in the Dark	1:35
10.	"Hōkago Daisakusen"	放課後大作戦	1:33
11.	"Old Comical Situation"	オールド・コミック・シチュエーション	1:58
12.	"Koroshiai Tokku"	コロシアイ特区	1:59
13.	"Kōron One Inch Punch"	口論・ワン・インチ・パンチ	2:18
14.	"Shokei ni Negai o The Animation"	処刑に願いを The Animation	2:40
15.	"Gakkyū Saiban Reimei Hen The Animation"	学級裁判黎明編 The Animation	2:08
16.	"Giron Break The Animation"	議論-BREAK-The Animation	2:54
17.	"Gakkyū Saiban Ransei Hen The Animation"	学級裁判乱世編 The Animation	2:18
18.	"Giron Heat Up The Animation"	議論-HEAT UP-The Animation	2:35
19.	"Gakkyū Saiban Taiyō Hen"	学級裁判太陽編 The Animation	2:04
20.	"Hoshū for Fuun"	補習 for 不運	1:43
21.	"Zetsubō Syndrome The Animation"	ゼツボウシンドローム The Animation	1:55
22.	"Box 16 The Animation"	BOX 16 The Animation	2:05
23.	"Chō Kōkō Gyū no Zetsubōteki Oshioki"	超高校級の絶望的おしおき	1:01
24.	"New World Order The Animation"	ニュー・ワールド・オーダー The Animation	2:15
25.	"Sayonara Zetsubō Gakuen The Animation"	さよなら絶望学園 The Animation	2:48
26.	"Zetsubōsei: Hero Chiryōyaku The Animation" (by Suzumu, with vocals from Soraru)	絶望性：ヒーロー治療薬 The Animation	1:32
27.	"Monokuma Ondo The Animation" (with vocals from Nobuyo Ōyama)	モノクマおんど The Animation	1:36
Total length:			1:42:47

=== Danganronpa Another Episode: Ultra Despair Girls Original Soundtrack ===
Danganronpa Another Episode: Ultra Despair Girls Original Soundtrack

Soundtrack album by Masafumi Takada
- Released: December 18, 2014
- Genre: Video game music
- Length: 2:47:39
- Label: Sound Prestige Records

The music of the action-adventure spin-off game Danganronpa Another Episode: Ultra Despair Girls was released by Sound Prestige Records in Japan on December 18, 2014. With a total length of 2:47:39, the soundtrack was headed by Takada and includes three discs with 75 tracks, some arrangements of songs from Ultra Despair Girls' predecessors. In terms of new tracks, in addition to some nonsense songs, the soundtrack features two lyrical pieces: the insert song "Let's Play with Monokuma", written by Kodaka and performed by the Monokuma Kids, and the game's ending theme "Progressive", composed and arranged by Tomohiro Nakatsuchi and sung by Ogata and Aya Uchida. "Progressive", which was also released as a separate single in 2015, serves as the soundtrack's effective ending, and is followed only by sound effects and an instrumental version of "Let's Play with Monokuma".

When writing the soundtrack, Takada attempted to avoid reusing melodies from Trigger Happy Havoc and Goodbye Despair, while still trying to maintain the general tone of the prior installments. In an interview with Video Game Music Online, Kodaka stated that he had requested the soundtrack to have an electro style reminiscent to the 1980s.

The soundtrack made a singular appearance on the Oricon Albums Chart, at No. 299. In a review for RPGFan, Patrick Gann expressed disappointment in the soundtrack's amount of returning themes and commented on abundant similaries between arranged tracks and their Danganronpa 2 counterparts; Gann advised listeners to only purchase the Ultra Despair Girls soundtrack if they did not already own the soundtracks to the first two games. Gann did, however, find himself liking the "occasional" new music pieces, praising many for their style and use in-game.

All tracks are written by Masafumi Takada, unless otherwise noted.

Disc 1
No.	Title	Japanese title (romanization)	Length
1.	"DSO Danganronpa"	DSO_DANGANRONPA	1:38
2.	"Ultra? Despair? Girls?"	絶対?絶望?少女? (Zettai? Zetsubō? Shōjo?)	3:31
3.	"DSO Beautiful Dead"	DSO_BeautifulDead	6:55
4.	"Wonderful Dead 001"	Wonderful dead001	4:46
5.	"DSO Distrust"	DSO_DISTRUST	2:05
6.	"Chapter Title"	チャプタータイトル (Chaputā Taitoru)	0:12
7.	"It's a Monokuma World"	イッツ・ア・モノクマワールド(Ittsu・A・Monokuma Wārudo)	4:35
8.	"Ultra Terrified Girl"	絶対恐怖少女 (Zettai Kyōfu Shōjo)	2:31
9.	"Business Trip Version Punishment [Helicopter Crash Episode]"	おしおき出張版～ヘリ墜落編～ (Oshioki Shucchōgen ~Heri Tsuiraku-hen~)	1:03
10.	"We Can't Change the World"	わたし達は世界を変えることができない (Watashi Tachi wa Sekai o Kaeru Koto ga Dekinai)	1:32
11.	"Hope of the Other Side"	向こう岸の希望 (Mukō Kishi no Zetsubō)	0:23
12.	"Secret Base [Left Behind by the Adults]"	secret base～オトナがのこしたもの～ (secret base ~Otona ga no Koshita Mono~)	3:53
13.	"Under Attack"	オソワレルモノ (Osowareru Mono)	0:28
14.	"Versus"	VERSUS	1:59
15.	"Wonderful Dead 002"	Wonderful dead002	4:46
16.	"DSO Living to the Fullest"	DSO_イキキル (DSO_Ikikiru)	3:29
17.	"Sortie! Its Name Is Robot"	出撃! その名はロボ (Shutsugeki! Sono Na wa Robo)	0:53
18.	"Riddle Land"	なぞなぞらんど (Nazonazo Rando)	3:58
19.	"Business Trip Version Punishment [Parachute Landing Episode]"	おしおき出張版～パラシュート落下編～ (Oshioki Shucchōgen ~Parashūto Rakka-hen~)	0:45
20.	"DSO 100 Mile Junk Food Dash"	DSO_ 疾走する青春のジャンクフード (DSO_Shissō Suru Seishun no Jankufūdo)	3:02
21.	"Welcome to Towa Tower"	Welcome to TOWA tower	3:52
22.	"Monster That Shouts Its Love in the Center of Hell"	地獄の中心で愛を叫ぶマモノ (Jigoku no Chūshin de Ai o Sakebu Mamono)	1:34
23.	"Business Trip Version Punishment [Swimming Explosion Episode]"	おしおき出張版～水泳爆破編～ (Oshioki Shucchōgen ~Suiei Bakuha-hen~)	0:41
24.	"DSO Desire for Execution"	DSO_処刑に願いを (DSO_Shokei ni Negai o)	2:50
25.	"This is the Path We Follow"	これが、わたし達の生きる道 (Kore ga, Watashi Tachi no Ikiru Michi)	2:12

Disc 2
No.	Title	Japanese title (romanization)	Length
1.	"Let's Play with Monokuma" (lyrics by Kazutaka Kodaka)	モノクマと遊ぼう (Monokuma Asobō)	3:09
2.	"Ghost Stories from the School District of Revolution"	革命学区のおとぎばなし (Kakumei Gakku no Otogibanashi)	3:53
3.	"Abnormality on the Girls' Front Line"	少女戦線異状あり (Shōjo Sensen Ijō Ari)	2:15
4.	"The Warriors of Hope"	希望の戦士たち (Zetsubō no Senshi Tachi)	3:18
5.	"DSO Despair-Syndrome"	DSO_絶望症候群 (DSO_Zetsubō Shōkōgun)	5:05
6.	"Punishment of the Hero"	勇者のおしおき (Yūsha no Oshioki)	1:22
7.	"DSO Shore-Scented Dead End"	DSO_磯の香りのデッドエンド (DSO_Iso no Kaori no Deddo Endo)	3:48
8.	"Ultra Despair Girl"	絶対絶望少女 (Zettai Zetsubō Shōjo)	3:05
9.	"Ultra Delusional Girl"	絶対妄想少女 (Zettai Mōsō Shōjo)	2:12
10.	"Business Trip Version Punishment [Adult Diorama Episode]"	おしおき出張版～オトナのジオラマ編～ (Oshioki Shucchōgen ~Otona no Jiorama-hen~)	0:43
11.	"Punishment of the Priest"	僧侶のおしおき (Sōryo no Oshioki)	1:07
12.	"It's a Kids' World"	イッツ・ア・キッズワールド (Ittsu・A・Kizzu Wārudo)	3:00
13.	"Wonderful Dead 003"	Wonderful dead003	4:46
14.	"Business Trip Version Punishment [Monokuma Raid Episode]"	おしおき出張版～モノクマ襲来編～ (Oshioki Shucchōgen ~Monokuma Shūrai-hen~)	0:54
15.	"Alice in the Children's Land"	コドモの国のアリス (Kodomo no Kuni no Arisu)	5:38
16.	"The Light of Darkness"	暗闇のアカリ (Kurayami no Akari)	0:20
17.	"DSO All All Apologies"	DSO_オール・オール・アポロジーズ (DSO_Āru・Āru・Aporojīzu)	3:03
18.	"Punishment of the Warrior"	戦士のおしおき (Senshi no Oshioki)	0:45
19.	"DSO Welcome Despair School"	DSO_ようこそ絶望学園 (DSO_Yōkoso Zetsubō Gakuen)	2:16
20.	"The Destruction of Darkness"	暗闇のハカイ (Kurayami no Hakai)	0:39
21.	"Like I Would Become a Monster"	魔物になんか、なるもんか (Mamono ni Nanka, Naru Monka)	3:15
22.	"Melody of Shivering"	戦慄の旋律 (Senritsu no Senritsu)	0:33
23.	"DSO New World Order"	DSO_ニュー・ワールド・オーダー (DSO_Nyū・Wārudo・Ōdā)	2:42
24.	"Chapter End"	チャプターエンド (Chaputā Endo)	0:12
25.	"Big Bang Monokuma Appears!!"	ビッグバンモノクマ登場!! (Biggu Ban Monokuma Tōjō)	0:18

Disc 3
No.	Title	Japanese title (romanization)	Length
1.	"Wonderful Dead 004"	Wonderful dead004	4:44
2.	"The Forbidden Playhouse"	禁じられたあそび場 (Kinjirareta Asobi Ba)	3:04
3.	"Last Versus"	ラストVERSUS (Rasuto VERSUS)	2:03
4.	"Re: Underground Trial"	Re: 開廷アンダーグラウンド (Re: Kaitei Andāguraundo)	1:50
5.	"Shou's Fever Time"	翔'sフィーバータイム (Shō' Fībā Taimu)	2:49
6.	"DSO Weekly Despair Magazine"	DSO_週刊少年ゼツボウマガジン (DSO_Shūkan Shōnen Zetsubō Magajin)	3:44
7.	"Punishment of the Sage!!"	僧侶のおしおき!! (Sōryo no Oshioki)	0:35
8.	"DSO Mr. Monokuma's Extracurricular Lesson"	DSO_モノクマ先生の課外授業 (DSO_Monokuma-sensei no Kagaijukyō)	2:49
9.	"DSO Despair Syndrome"	DSO_ゼツボウシンドローム (DSO_Zetsubō Shindorōmu)	2:42
10.	"Departing from Towa Towards the Hell"	塔和発地獄行き (Tōwa Hacchi Goku Iki)	2:51
11.	"Wonderful Dead 005"	Wonderful dead005	4:47
12.	"Decisive Battle with the Mage"	魔法使いとの最終決戦 (Mahōtsukai to no Saishū Kessen)	1:01
13.	"Argument [Hope VS Despair]"	議論 -HOPE VS DESPAIR- (Giron -HOPE VS DESPAIR-)	3:20
14.	"Punishment of the Mage"	魔法使いのおしおき (Mahōtsukai no Oshioki)	0:16
15.	"Day Before the Future"	未来の前の日 (Mirai no Mae no Hi)	3:09
16.	"Progressive (Short Version)" (by Tomohiro Nakatsuchi, with vocals from Megumi Ogata and Aya Uchida)	progressive-漸進-ShortVersion (progressive-Zenshin-ShortVersion)	1:46
17.	"Monoc-Man Activate"	モノックマン起動 (Monokkuman Kidō)	0:15
18.	"I'm Going Delusional"	妄想しちゃうわよん (Mōsō Shichauwayon)	0:15
19.	"The Store"	おみせやさん (Omiseya-san)	0:10
20.	"Challenge from a Child"	コドモの挑戦状 (Kodomo no Chōsenjō)	0:06
21.	"Saving on a Potty"	おまるでセーブ (Omaru de Sebbu)	0:06
22.	"Truth Bullet Get!"	コトダマGETだぜ! (Kotodama GET Daze!)	0:06
23.	"Skill Get!"	スキルGETだぜ! (Sukiru GET Daze!)	0:06
24.	"Hidden Kids Discovered!"	隠れキッズ発見! (Kakure Kizzu Hakken!)	0:07
25.	"Let's Play with Monokuma (Instruments)"	モノクマと遊ぼう(Instruments) (Monokuma to Asobō (Instruments))	3:07
Total length:			2:47:39

=== Danganronpa V3: Killing Harmony Original Soundtrack White and Black ===
Danganronpa: V3: Killing Harmony Original Soundtrack White; Danganronpa: V3: Killing Harmony Original Soundtrack Black

Soundtrack album by Masafumi Takada
- Released: February 24, 2017
- Genre: Video game music; jazz; electronic; rock
- Length: 2:32:38 (White); 2:47:16 (Black)
- Label: Sound Prestige Records

The music of Danganronpa's third mainline installment, Danganronpa V3: Killing Harmony, was released across two CD soundtrack albums, titled White and Black. The soundtrack was composed by Takada, and the two albums were jointly issued by Sound Prestige Records on February 24, 2017, with a collective length of 5:14:32–2:32:38 from White's 53 tracks and 2:47:16 from Black's 57 tracks. A bundle of both albums, packaged with a single-track remix CD by Takada called the Happy Holidays Mix, was sold through certain online retailers.

The soundtrack of Danganronpa V3 had a higher emphasize on jazz – something more "stylish than pop" – which Takada opined gave it a more mature and darker tone. The soundtrack was split across two albums due to having a larger track list than previous Danganronpa titles.

Both albums appeared on the Oricon Albums Chart: White peaked at No. 145 and Black peaked at No. 125. Black charted for two weeks, whereas White only charted for one. The soundtrack of V3 was nominated for best video game score in the "Rock / Electronic / Hybrid" category at Video Game Music Online's 2017 Game Music Awards, but lost to Splatoon 2.

All tracks are written by Masafumi Takada.

White - Disc 1
No.	Title	Japanese title (romanization)	Length
1.	"Danganronpa V3"	DANGANRONPA V3	1:57
2.	"Danganronpa! V3!"	だんがんろんぱ!ぶいすりー! (Danganronpa! Buisurī!)	1:36
3.	"Rise of the Ultimates"	Rise of the Ultimate	3:56
4.	"Exisal Tribe"	EXISAL TRIBE	4:35
5.	"Monokumaz"	モノクマーズ登場 (Monokumāzu Tōjō)	0:26
6.	"16 Makeover"	16人の変身 (Jūroku-hito no Henshin)	0:33
7.	"Rise and Shine, Ursine!"	おはっくまー! (Ohakkumā!)	3:21
8.	"Chapter A"	チャプタークレジット (Chaputā Kurejitto)	0:12
9.	"Mr. Monokuma Appearance"	モノクマ登場 (Monokuma Tōjō)	0:17
10.	"Becoming Friends"	Become Friends	4:23
11.	"Nightmare in the Locker"	Nightmare in Locker	3:50
12.	"Beautiful Lie"	Beautiful Lie	4:19
13.	"Dead Body Found A"	死体発見A (Shitai Hakken A)	0:20
14.	"New A.A. (Ch. 1)"	NEW T.A	4:57
15.	"DX Growth Plan"	DX育成計画 (DX Ikusei Keikaku)	2:19
16.	"Living in a Lazy Parallel World"	Living in Lazy Parallel World	4:00
17.	"Despair Searching"	絶望Searching (Zetsubō Searching)	4:23
18.	"Cool Morning"	Cool Morning	3:23
19.	"Death Road of Despair"	絶望デスロード (Zetsubō Desu Rōdo)	3:21
20.	"Psyche Taxi"	BRAIN DRIVER	3:39
21.	"Darkness Time"	Darkness Time	4:15
22.	"Der Flohwalzer"	ネコふんじゃった (Nekofunjatta)	1:50
23.	"Heaven of Almost Hell"	Almost Hell Heaven	2:39
24.	"Clair de Lune from Suite bergamasque C. Debussy"	Clair de Lune from Suite bergamasque C.Debussy Piano: 赤松楓 (Clair de Lune from Suite bergamasque C.Debussy Piano: Akamatsu Kaede)	2:16
25.	"Chapter C"	チャプターエンドクレジット (Chaputā Endo Kurejitto)	0:18
26.	"Hope of Spring"	Hope of Spring	1:56
27.	"Spirit, Praise, and Beauty"	霊と礼と麗と (Rei to Rei to Rei to)	3:56
28.	"Caged Child (Instrumental)"	かごのこ (Kago no Ko)	1:13

White - Disc 2
No.	Title	Japanese title (romanization)	Length
1.	"Danganronpa V3 (Loop Version)"	DANGANRONPA V3 Loop Version	3:59
2.	"Danganvegas"	DANVEGAS	4:46
3.	"Finding Peace Party"	Finding Peace Party	3:55
4.	"MonoMono Slots"	モノモノスロット (Monomono Surotto)	4:41
5.	"Mind Mine"	発掘イマジネーション (Hakkutsu Imajinēshon)	4:05
6.	"Death Road of Hope"	希望デスロード (Kibō Desu Rōdo)	2:45
7.	"Talent Selection"	才能Select (Sainō Select)	1:28
8.	"New Classmates of the Dead"	New Classmate of the Dead	3:28
9.	"Hope of Summer"	Hope of Summer	1:51
10.	"Mr. Monokuma's Lesson V3"	モノクマ先生の授業V3 (Monokuma-sensei no Jugyō V3)	3:35
11.	"Living in Lazy Parallel World (Short Ver.)"	Living in Lazy Parallel World (Short Ver.)	4:00
12.	"Moon on the Water"	Moon on the Water	3:26
13.	"Dead Body Found C"	死体発見C (Shitai Hakken C)	0:15
14.	"Real / Fiction"	REAL・FICTION	4:25
15.	"Mr. Monokuma After Class V3"	モノクマ先生の課外授業V3 (Monokuma-sensei no Kagaijugyō V3)	2:50
16.	"An Agony Thread"	苦悶の糸 (Kumon no Ito)	1:34
17.	"Wonderful Story"	Wonderful Story	2:32
18.	"Let's Start the Killing Game"	Let's コロシアイ (Let's Koroshiai)	2:17
19.	"Hyper New A.A. (Ch. 1)"	HYPER NEW T.A	3:59
20.	"Dead Body Found B"	死体発見B (Shitai Hakken B)	0:14
21.	"Immersion Picture Scrolls"	今昔仕置絵巻 (Konjaku Shioki Emaki)	1:38
22.	"Closing Argument V3"	クライマックス推理V3 (Kuraimakkusu Suiri V3)	5:30
23.	"Climactic Re-enactment V3"	クライマックス再現V3 (Kuraimakkusu Saigen V3)	4:24
24.	"Pretitle A"	アバンムービー (Aban Mūbī)	0:59
25.	"The End of DNG"	The END of DNG	5:22
Total length:			2:32:38

Black - Disc 1
No.	Title	Japanese title (romanization)	Length
1.	"Danganronpa V3 (Full Version)"	DANGANRONPA V3 Full Version	2:18
2.	"V3 Gallery Music"	V3Gallery Music	1:38
3.	"Chapter B"	チャプターブリッジ (Chaputā Burijji)	0:11
4.	"Beautiful Lie (Ver. B)"	スグBeautiful Lie (Sugu Beautiful Lie)	4:01
5.	"Dead Body Found D"	死体発見D (Shitai Hakken D)	0:20
6.	"Bugs Panic"	バグズパニック (Bagusu Panikku)	1:33
7.	"Our Class Trial"	私と僕の学級裁判 (Watashi to Boku no Gakkyū Saiban)	1:49
8.	"Class Trial: Dawn Edition Vol. 3"	学級裁判黎明編 巻の三 (Gakkyū Saiban Reimei-hen Maki no San)	5:07
9.	"Class Trial: Space Edition"	学級裁判宇宙編 (Gakkyū Saiban Uchū-hen)	6:05
10.	"Class Trial: Resurrection Edition"	学級裁判復活編 (Gakkyū Saiban Fukkatsu-hen)	4:07
11.	"V3 Argument [Break]"	V3議論 -BREAK- (V3 Giron -BREAK-)	2:55
12.	"Debate Scrum"	V3議論 -SCRUM- (V3 Giron -SCRUM-)	4:57
13.	"Class Trial: Sun Edition V3"	学級裁判太陽編V3 (Gakkyū Saiban Taiyō-hen V3)	4:41
14.	"V3 Argument [Turn Up the Heat]"	V3議論 -HEAT UP- (V3 Giron -HEAT UP-)	5:02
15.	"V3 Argument [Panic]"	V3議論 -PANIC- (V3 Giron -PANIC-)	2:54
16.	"V3 Argument [Hope VS Despair]"	V3議論 -HOPE VS DESPAIR- (V3 Giron -HOPE VS DESPAIR-)	3:20
17.	"Hangman's Gambit Ver. 3.0"	アナグラム.NEW (Anaguramu.NEW)	2:21
18.	"V3 Argument [Blade Lock]"	V3反論 -CROSS SWORD- (V3 Hanron -CROSS SWORD-)	4:42
19.	"Class Trial: Sun Edition V3 (Ver. B)"	スグ学級裁判太陽編V3 (Sugu Gakkyū Saiban Taiyō-hen V3)	4:05
20.	"V3 Argument [Perjury]"	V3議論 -PERJURY- (V3 Giron -PERJURY-)	2:54
21.	"Final A.A."	FINAL T.A	4:01
22.	"New World Order V3"	ニューワールドオーダーV3 (Nyū Wārudo Ōdā)	4:15

Black - Disc 2
No.	Title	Japanese title (romanization)	Length
1.	"Danganronpa Future Mix V3"	DANGANRONPA FUTURE MIX V3	1:33
2.	"Salmon Fishing"	SAKE NO TUKAMIDORI	2:44
3.	"Outlaw Run"	OUTLAW RUNNER	2:36
4.	"Hope of Autumn"	Hope of Autumn	1:37
5.	"Hope of Winter"	Hope of Winter	1:12
6.	"Dangan Growth Plan"	だんがん育成計画 (Dangan Ikusei Keikaku)	1:31
7.	"Dead Body Found E"	死体発見E (Shitai Hakken E)	0:11
8.	"Hope Searching"	希望Searching (Kibō Searching)	8:21
9.	"Class Trial: Resurrection Edition (No Intro)"	学級裁判復活編(イントロなし) (Gakkyū Saiban Fukkatsu-hen (Intoro Nashi))	2:54
10.	"Hyper Final A.A."	HYPER FINAL T.A	3:13
11.	"Season of Despair"	Season of Despair	1:17
12.	"New Space Journey"	ニュー宇宙旅行 (Nyū Uchūryokō)	1:49
13.	"Heartless Journey"	Heartless Journey	2:25
14.	"Hyper Ultra New A.A. (Ch. 1)"	HYPER ULTRA NEW T.A	3:19
15.	"Sing the Empty Truth"	歌え、虚ろなる真実を (Utae, Utsuro Naru Shinjitsu o)	2:55
16.	"Danganronpa Reissue"	DANGANRONPA reissue	5:23
17.	"Hyper Final Ultra A.A."	HYPER ULTRA FINAL T.A	2:42
18.	"Destruction of..."	才囚学園の破壊 (Saishū Gakuen no Hakai)	1:34
19.	"Killing Game Completion Ceremony"	みんなのコロシアイ修了式 (Minna no Koroshiai Shūryō Shiki)	5:45

Black - Disc 3
No.	Title	Japanese title (romanization)	Length
1.	"Pretitle B"	アバンムービー改 (Aban Mūbī Aratame)	1:17
2.	"Flashback Light"	思い出しライト (Omoidashi Raito)	0:35
3.	"Vote Slot"	投票スロット (Tōhyō Surotto)	0:24
4.	"Trial Preparation"	試練Prepare (Shiren Prepare)	1:17
5.	"Beautiful Lie in the Virtual World"	Beautiful Lie in ProgramWorld	2:48
6.	"Despair Searching: Virtual World"	絶望Searching in ProgramWorld	4:17
7.	"Battle with Despair"	絶望との戦い (Zetsubō to no Tatakai)	2:55
8.	"Island Ordeal"	Island Ordeal	2:29
9.	"Cave Ordeal"	Cave Ordeal	3:12
10.	"School Ordeal"	School Ordeal	4:40
11.	"Battle with True Despair"	真の絶望との戦い (Shin no Zetsubō to no Tataka)	3:19
12.	"Monokuma's Trial"	モノクマの試練 (Monokuma no Shiren)	1:36
13.	"Treasure Hunter! Monolith"	ここ掘る!モノリス (Koko Horu! Monorisu)	0:56
14.	"Battle with Final Despair"	最後の絶望との戦い (Saigo no Zetsubō to no Tatakai)	3:18
15.	"Let's Start the Killing Game (from Speaker)"	Let's コロシアイ放送 (Let's Koroshiai Hōsō)	2:18
16.	"Trial End"	試練END (Shiren END)	5:09
Total length:			2:47:16

=== Super Danganronpa 2: The Stage 2017 Original Soundtrack ===
Super Danganronpa 2: The Stage 2017 Original Soundtrack

Soundtrack album by Masafumi Takada
- Released: April 4, 2017
- Length: 2:25:00
- Label: Sound Prestige Records

A soundtrack album of songs from a 2017 stage play of Danganronpa 2 was published by Sound Prestige Records on April 4, 2017, in Japan, under the catalog number SPLR-1117~8. The album did not appear on any national charts.

== Other albums ==
From 2011 to 2012, two arrangement albums were released by Spike and Sound Prestige Records, containing tracks from the first two Danganronpa games. The first, containing remixes of tracks from Trigger Happy Havoc, as well as cutscene music, drama tracks, and cast comments, was released as part of a limited edition of the first game, and the second, containing tracks from Goodbye Despair, was released at a Comiket convention in 2014. Both albums were reviewed by RPGFan's Patrick Gann, who enjoyed the first album, while finding fault with how it can be hard or expensive to obtain due to its limited release, and found the second to be a possible "treasure" for fans of Takada. A third remix album, titled Danganronpa V3 ~Happy Holidays Mix~, was released in 2017 as a purchase incentive for bundles of the Danganronpa V3 soundtrack albums. Happy Holiday Mix contains a single, 21-minute long track by Takada that was originally played at a crossover livestream of Danganronpa and Gravity Rush. A fourth remix album, containing 10 tracks from the three mainline Danganronpa installments, was released in 2021 through a collector's edition of the Danganronpa Decadence game compilation.

Several mini soundtrack albums containing select Danganronpa tracks have been released, often bundled with limited releases of the series' games. Western series publisher NIS America has released five mini albums through their online store, exclusively in North America and Europe, containing tracks from Trigger Happy Havoc, Goodbye Despair, Another Episode: Ultra Despair Girls, the compilation game Danganronpa 1-2 Reload, and Killing Harmony. The Trigger Happy Havoc album would later be temporarily rereleased alongside the Steam release of the game in 2016. A separate mini album of Killing Harmony was released with early copies of the game, and with the limited edition of the game in Japan.

In 2020, a short album of character songs composed by Takada, titled Danganronpa-ism, was released by Sound Prestige Records in conjunction with the franchise's 10th anniversary.

== Songs ==
=== "Zetsubōsei: Hero Chiryōyaku" ===
"Zetsubōsei: Hero Chiryōyaku" is the ending theme to Danganronpa: The Animation. An electronic rock pop song, it is written by Suzumu and performed by Soraru. It was released both as a single and as track on the second disc of Danganronpa: The Animation's soundtrack album. The single was released by Geneon Universal Entertainment Japan and Rondo Robe on September 4, 2013. It came in both a regular and a limited edition; the limited edition included a bonus track and a DVD. The anime's soundtrack was released a month before the single.

With the B-sides "Haiiro Shōnen Rock" and "Zoku Hetakuso Utopia Seikin", the single release peaked at No. 17 on the Oricon Singles Chart and charted for seven weeks. Phile Web reported that the single had sold 5,920 copies by September 8, 2013.

All tracks are written by Suzumu.

No.	Title	Japanese title (romanization)	Length
1.	"Zetsubōsei: Hero Chiryōyaku" (featuring Soraru)	絶望性:ヒーロー治療薬 (Zetsubō-sei: Hīrō Chiryōyaku)	3:24
2.	"Haiiro Shōnen Rock" (featuring Soraru)	灰色少年ロック (Haiiro Shōnen Rokku)	4:09
3.	"Zoku Hetakuso Utopia Seikin" (featuring Soraru and Ron)	続・へたくそユートピア政策 (Zoku Hetakuso Yūtopia Seikin)	4:35
Total length:			12:08

Limited edition (bonus track)
No.	Title	Japanese title (romanization)	Length
1.	"Ka Shokusei: Idol Shōkōgun" (featuring Soraru and Ron) (KigiP Remix)	過食性:アイドル症候群 (Ka Shokusei: Aidoru Shōkōgun)	4:02

Limited edition (DVD)
No.	Title	Length
1.	"Interview"
2.	"Making of Zetsubōsei: Hero Chiryōyaku"

=== "World's End Curtain Call -Theme of Danganronpa the Stage-" ===
"World's End Curtain Call -Theme of Danganronpa the Stage-" is the theme song to Danganronpa: Kibō no Gakuen to Zetsubō no Kōkōsei The Stage, a 2014 stage play adaptation of Trigger Happy Havoc. It is by Trustrick, a musical duo consisting of guitarist Billy and vocalist Sayaka Kanda. "World's End Curtain Call" was released as a single by Nippon Columbia on November 12, 2014, though in a limited quantity of 3,868 copies. The song charted for a single week on the Oricon Singles Chart, making 27th place.

No.	Title	Length
1.	"World's End Curtain Call -Theme of Danganronpa the Stage-"	3:32
2.	"Trick or Holic" (Halloween Attack Mix) (by Ken Morioka))	3:49
3.	"World's End Curtain Call -Theme of Danganronpa the Stage-" (Off Vocal)	3:33
Total length:		10:54

=== "Progressive" ===
"Progressive", the ending theme to Ultra Despair Girls, is performed by Megumi Ogata and Aya Uchida as the characters Makoto and Komaru Naegi, respectively. It was composed and arranged by Tomohiro Nakatsuchi. The song was first released on the Ultra Despair Girls soundtrack album on December 18, 2014, on which it appeared on the third disc and acted as the album's effective final track. It was then released as a CD single on January 28, 2015, under the Lantis label. A reconstructed, high-resolution edition of the single, produced by Junnosuke Sato, was released on April 12, 2017.

"Progressive" charted once on the Oricon Singles Chart, at No. 62. A LisAni! review describes "Progressive" as a song that illustrates the singing characters' determination and courage to press on despite tough conditions. The review attributes the emotion to the song's intense rock and Ogata and Uchida's vocals, and also lauds the high-resolution release for achieving a more energetic sound that amplifies the lyrics' vividness. Reviewing the Ultra Despair Girls's soundtrack, Patrick Gann called "Progressive" his favorite Danganronpa game ending theme, and said that it made the soundtrack end on a high note.

The B-side on the "Progressive" single is "Poison -Gekiyaku-". It is performed by Ogata as the character Nagito Komaeda. Alike "Progressive", "Poison (Gekiyaku)" was praised in a LisAni! review, which referred to Ogata's vocals as the highlight of the track, with the lyrics walking on a line of good and bad luck, something indicative of Nagito's character.

All tracks are written by Tomohiro Nakatsuchi.

No.	Title	Japanese title (romanization)	Length
1.	"Progressive" (featuring Megumi Ogata and Aya Uchida)	progressive -漸進- (Progressive -Zenshin-)	4:01
2.	"Poison -Gekiyaku-" (featuring Ogata)	poison -劇薬- (Poison -Gekiyaku-)	5:20
3.	"Progressive" (Off Vocal)	progressive -漸進- (Progressive -Zenshin-)	4:01
4.	"Poison -Gekiyaku-" (Off Vocal)	poison -劇薬- (Poison -Gekiyaku-)	5:18
Total length:			18:40

=== Danganronpa 3: The End of Hope's Peak High School themes ===
The Danganronpa 3: The End of Hope's Peak High School anime series features original opening and ending themes. "Kamiiro Awase" is the opening theme to the show's Despair Arc, accompanied by "Zettai Kibō Birthday" as the corresponding ending theme. The Future Arc features "Dead or Lie" as its opening, whilst "Recall the End" is the ending. "Ever Free" by Hide with Spread Beaver is used as an ending theme exclusively in the final episode, being chosen to conclude the show since Kodaka had been listening to the song during the beginning of production.

The Despair Arc ending theme, "Zettai Kibō Birthday", is performed by Ogata as Nagito Komaeda. It was released as a single by NBCUniversal Entertainment Japan on August 3, 2016. The complementing opening theme, "Kamiiro Awase", is performed by the four-member music unit Binaria, made up of writer Annabel, composer Nagi Yanagi, arranger Yoshihisa Nagao, and visual artist Xai. "Kamiiro Awase" was released as a single by NBCUniversal Japan on the same day as "Zettai Kibō Birthday", and was available in both a regular and limited edition. "Zettai Kibō Birthday" featured on the Oricon charts for three weeks, peaking at 37th place, whilst "Kamiiro Awase" charted for four weeks and peaked at No. 38.

The opening theme to the Future Arc, "Dead or Lie", is performed by Maon Kurosaki and Trustrick. It is composed and arranged by Keisuke Kurose of the band Uroboros, with its lyrics having been written by Kurosaki. The Future Arc ending theme, "Recall the End", is performed by Trustrick alone, and is produced and arranged by Narasaki of Coaltar of the Deepers. "Recall the End" was released on August 10, 2016, by Nippon Columbia as part of an extended play. "Dead or Lie" was released as a single seven days later, on NBCUniversal Entertainment Japan. "Dead or Lie" stayed on the Oricon Singles Chart for five weeks, peaking at No. 27, whilst "Recall the End" charted for three weeks on the albums chart, peaking at No. 17.

Music videos for "Kamiiro Awase" and "Dead or Lie" were released by NBCUniversal Japan, after they had showcased them in 45 to 50 second previews on YouTube.

"Kamiiro Awase" single
No.	Title	Japanese title	Length
1.	"Kamiiro Awase"	カミイロアワセ	4:34
2.	"Reino Blanco"	reino blanco	4:51
3.	"Kamiiro Awase" (Instrumental)	カミイロアワセ	4:34
4.	"Reino Blanco" (Instrumental)	reino blanco	4:49
Total length:			18:48

"Zettai Kibō Birthday" single
No.	Title	Japanese title (romanization)	Length
1.	"Zettai Kibō Birthday"	絶対希望バースデー (Zettai Kibō Bāsudē)	4:21
2.	"Zanō (Zanka)"	残桜 -zanka- (Zanō -zanka-)	4:09
3.	"Zettai Kibō Birthday" (Instrumental)	絶対希望バースデー (Zettai Kibō Bāsudē)	4:21
4.	"Zanō (Zanka)" (Instrumental)	残桜 -zanka- (Zanō -zanka-)	4:05
Total length:			16:56

"Dead or Lie" single
No.	Title	Length
1.	"Dead or Lie"	4:26
2.	"Brand New, Standing Wings"	4:29
3.	"Dead or Lie" (Instrumental)	4:26
4.	"Brand New, Standing Wings" (Instrumental)	4:28
Total length:		17:49

Recall the End extended play
No.	Title	Japanese title	Length
1.	"Recall the End"	Recall THE END	4:22
2.	"Reborn at Caution Area -Theme of Danganronpa the Stage 2016-"	REBORN AT CAUTION AREA -theme of DANGANRONPA THE STAGE 2016-	4:13
3.	"Eien" (78th Last Hope Remix)	永遠	4:47
4.	"World's End Curtain Call -Theme of Danganronpa the Stage-"	World's End Curtain Call -theme of DANGANRONPA THE STAGE-	3:32
5.	"Good Bye School Dayz -Theme of Super Danganronpa 2 the Stage-"	Good Bye School Dayz -theme of SUPER DANGANRONPA 2 THE STAGE-	3:58
6.	"Recall the End" (Instrumental)	Recall THE END	4:24
7.	"Reborn at Caution Area -Theme of Danganronpa the Stage 2016-" (Instrumental)	REBORN AT CAUTION AREA -theme of DANGANRONPA THE STAGE 2016-	4:13
8.	"Recall the End" (Anime ED Version)	Recall THE END	1:32
Total length:			31:01

=== "Samurai Tunes" ===
"Samurai Tunes" is an electronic dance rap song by the boy band of the same name, that serves as the ending theme to Danganronpa 3 The Stage 2018 ~The End of Kibōgamine Gakuen~, a stage adaptation of Danganronpa 3: The End of Hope's Peak High School. The song was featured on Samurai Tunes' eponymous debut single, released by Nippon Columbia on July 18, 2018. The single charted on the Oricon charts for two weeks, peaking at No. 33.

No.	Title	Japanese title	Length
1.	"Samurai Tunes"	SAMURAI TUNES	3:49
2.	"Chō Gimon"	超GIMON	3:35
3.	"Samurai Tunes" (Instrumental)	SAMURAI TUNES	3:49
4.	"Chō Gimon" (Instrumental)	超GIMON	3:35
Total length:			14:48

== Reception and legacy ==
Danganronpa's music has been described as essential to the series' personality by both reviewers and staff: Destructoid's Eric van Allen called the series' music a vocal part of its tone, and Kodaka hailed the music as "super important" in an interview with Video Games Music Online. The soundtracks have been nominated twice in the Game Music Awards, an annual ceremony hosted by Video Game Music Online, and the series' titular main theme was listed by Screen Rant as one of the ten best theme songs in video games.

Danganronpa music has been performed live on different occasions. At the 2017 iteration of the gaming festival Tokaigi, eight tracks from Danganronpa V3 were performed by a Takada-led band. In November 2021, two performances of popular songs from the series were held in Saitama Prefecture, in conjunction with Danganronpa's 10th anniversary.

Remixed Danganronpa tracks are included in the rhythm game Crypt of the NecroDancer, along with a skin of Danganronpa mascot and antagonist Monokuma, as part of a collaboration between the two IPs. Two lyrical songs from the series have appeared in greatest hits albums of their artists: "Zetsubōsei: Hero Chiryōyaku" in Suzumu's Zoku Kebyoningen (2015) and "Dead or Lie" in Maon Kurosaki's M.A.O.N (2017).
