= The Camel's Back =

- Cover art by Galia Durant

Studio album by Psapp
- Released: 27 October 2008; 17 February 2009
- Recorded: 2008
- Genres: Electronica, experimental pop
- Length: 39:46
- Label: Domino
- Producers: Carim Clasmann; Galia Durant

Psapp chronology
The Only Thing I Ever Wanted (2006)	The Camel's Back (2008)	What Makes Us Glow (2013)

Professional ratings
Aggregate scores
Source	Rating
Metacritic	72/100
Review scores
Source	Rating
AllMusic	4/5 stars
Pitchfork Media	(5.6/10)
Boomkat	(favorable)
Gigwise	3.5/5 stars
inthenews.co.uk	(8/10)
Metro	4/5 stars
musicOMH	3.5/5 stars
Music Week	(favorable)
This Is Fake DIY	6/10 stars

The Camel's Back is the third album by Psapp.

"The Monster Song" was released as the album's first single on 3 November 2008 in the UK. "I Want That" was released as the second single in the UK on 30 March 2009.

== Track listing ==
All tracks are written by Carim Clasmann and Galia Durant at the new and old Fishtank Studios, London.

No.	Title	Length
1.	"I Want That"	3:53
2.	"Part Like Waves"	4:25
3.	"The Camel's Back"	1:58
4.	"Fickle Ghost"	2:48
5.	"The Monster Song"	3:29
6.	"Somewhere There Is a Record of Our Actions"	4:01
7.	"Marshrat"	3:58
8.	"Fix It"	3:03
9.	"Mister Ant"	4:01
10.	"Screws"	2:53
11.	"Homicide"	0:54
12.	"Parker"	4:23
13.	"Two" (iTunes Bonus Track)	2:53

== Personnel ==
Psapp

- Carim Clasmann
- Galia Durant

Additional personnel

- Alessandro Antonio Palmitessa – saxophone, "I Want That" and "Marshrat"
- Bekah Nelson – additional strings, "Part Like Waves"
- The Elysium Quartett – additional strings, "Part Like Waves"
  - Anna-Maria Smerd – violin
  - Jana Mishenina – violin
  - Gabrielle Kancachian – viola
  - Felicia Meric – cello
- Chris Walmsley – additional percussion, "Fix It" and "Mister Ant"
- Shawn Lee – unspecified noises, "Homicide"
- Pete Norman – mastering

== Alternate versions ==
- In addition to the bonus track listed above, the iTunes versions available in most regions outside of the United States include an exclusive 16-page booklet.
- As with Psapp's The Only Thing I Ever Wanted, a two-disc promotional version was produced in the UK. The first disc is identical to the commercial release, while the second disc contains all of the album tracks with the vocals removed where applicable. Both discs are marked "Not for Sale."

== Notes ==
- The first track from the album that Psapp made public on their MySpace page was "I Want That." It was later replaced by "Part Like Waves."
- The first video to be released was "The Monster Song." The video was made in conjunction with Stephen Irwin, features artwork created by Durant, and can be seen here.
- The title of "Mister Ant" was taken from an incident in which Durant's sister, a teacher, gave her name as "Miss Durant," to which a student replied, "Why are you called 'Mister Ant' when you're a woman?"
- "Homicide" is essentially an extended version of the underlying sounds heard during the outro to Psapp's recording of David Shrigley and Psapp's "Sad Song."
