= List of A Certain Magical Index episodes =

A Certain Magical Index is a Japanese light novel series written by Kazuma Kamachi and illustrated by Kiyotaka Haimura, which was later adapted into an anime series. The story follows the adventures of Toma Kamijo, a high school student in the scientific-advanced Academy City whose right hand contains a unique power called "Imagine Breaker", and Index, a young nun from the Church of England whose mind has been implanted with 103,000 grimoires of the Index Librorum Prohibitorum. The series broadcast 74 episodes over three seasons.

The first season aired on Chiba TV on October 4, 2008, and later on AT-X on January 8, 2009, upon the release of episode 14, until March 19, and consisted of twenty-four episodes. It adapts the first six volumes of the light novel. The second season aired from October 8, 2010, to April 1, 2011, and consisted of twenty-four episodes. It adapts the seventh to the thirteenth volume of the light novel. The third season aired from October 5, 2018, to April 5, 2019, and consisted of twenty-six episodes. It adapts the final nine volumes of the light novel. All three seasons are available on Blu-ray and DVD, as well as on streaming services.

== Series overview ==
Season	Episodes	Originally released		
Season	Episodes	First released	Last released	Network
1	24	October 4, 2008	March 19, 2009	Chiba TV
2	24	October 8, 2010	April 1, 2011	AT-X
3	26	October 5, 2018	April 5, 2019	AT-X

== Episodes ==
=== Season 1 (2008–2009) ===
No. overall	No. in season	Title	Directed by	Written by	Storyboarded by	Original release date (Note: Chiba TV lists the series premiere as airing on October 4 at 25:30, which is effectively October 5 at 1:35 a.m. JST)
1	1	"Academy City"; Transliteration: "Gakuen-toshi" (Japanese: 学園都市)	Hiroshi Nishikiori	Masanao Akahoshi	Hiroshi Nishikiori	October 5, 2008
2	2	"Innocentius (The Witch Hunter King)"; Transliteration: "Inokentiusu (Majokari no Ō)" (Japanese: 魔女狩りの王(イノケンティウス))	Katsushi Sakurabi	Masanao Akahoshi	Satoshi Iwataki	October 12, 2008
3	3	"Necessarius (The Church of Necessary Evil)"; Transliteration: "Nesesariusu (Hitsuyō Aku no Kyōkai)" (Japanese: 必要悪の教会(ネセサリウス))	Hideki Tachibana	Masanao Akahoshi	Hideki Tachibana	October 19, 2008
4	4	"Perfect Memory Ability"; Transliteration: "Kanzen Kioku Nōryoku" (Japanese: 完全記憶能力)	Kōsuke Kobayashi	Masanao Akahoshi	Noriyuki Nakamura & Hiroshi Nishikiori	October 26, 2008
5	5	"Limit (12 o'clock)" Transliteration: "Rimitto (Jūni-toki)" (Japanese: 十二時(リミット))	Shinya Kawatsura	Masanao Akahoshi	Tetsuya Yanagisawa	November 2, 2008
6	6	"Imagine Breaker"; Transliteration: "Imajin Bureikā" (Japanese: 幻想殺し(イマジンブレイカー))	Kei Umabiki	Masanao Akahoshi	Hiroshi Nishikiori	November 9, 2008
7	7	"The Science Cult (Misawa Cram School)"; Transliteration: "Kagaku Sūhai (Misawa Juku)" (Japanese: 三沢塾(かがくすうはい))	Kazuo Tomizawa	Akira Tanizaki	Satoshi Kuwabara & Hiroshi Nishikiori	November 16, 2008
8	8	"Ars Magna (Golden Transmutation)"; Transliteration: "Arusu = Maguna (Kogane Rensei)" (Japanese: 黄金錬成(アルス＝マグナ))	Noriyuki Fukuda	Masanao Akahoshi	Tetsuya Yanagisawa	November 23, 2008
9	9	"Deep Blood (Vampire Killer)"; Transliteration: "Dīpu Buraddo (Kyūketsu Koroshi)" (Japanese: 吸血殺し(ディープブラッド))	Tamaki Nakatsu	Seishi Minakami	Tamaki Nakatsu	November 30, 2008
10	10	"Mikoto Misaka (Sissy)"; Transliteration: "Misaka Mikoto (Onē-sama)" (Japanese: お姉様(みさかみこと))	Hideki Tachibana	Satoru Nishizono	Hideki Tachibana	December 7, 2008
11	11	"Sisters"; Transliteration: "Shisutāzu" (Japanese: 妹達(シスターズ))	Hiroshi Tsuruta	Satoru Nishizono	Tetsuya Yanagisawa	December 14, 2008
12	12	"Level 6 (Absolute Ability)"; Transliteration: "Reberu Shikkusu (Zettai Nōryoku)" (Japanese: 絶対能力(レベル6))	Shigeru Ueda	Satoru Nishizono	Hiroshi Nishikiori	December 21, 2008
13	13	"Accelerator (One Way)"; Transliteration: "Akuserarēta (Ippōtsūkō)" (Japanese: 一方通行(アクセラレータ))	Daisuke Takashima	Satoru Nishizono	Masahiko Komino	December 28, 2008
14	14	"Weakest vs. Strongest (Strongest vs. Weakest)"; Transliteration: "Saijaku tai Saikyō (Saikyō tai Saijaku)" (Japanese: 最強VS最弱(さいじゃくたいさいきょう))	Katsushi Sakurabi	Satoru Nishizono	Yūichi Nihei	January 8, 2009 (Note: Episode 14 onwards for the rest of the season began airing first on AT-X)
15	15	"Angel Fall"; Transliteration: "Enzeru Fōru" (Japanese: 御使堕し(エンゼルフォール))	Tamaki Nakatsu	Seishi Minakami	Tamaki Nakatsu	January 15, 2009
16	16	"Tōya Kamijō (Father)"; Transliteration: "Kamijō Tōya (Chichi Oya)" (Japanese: 父親(かみじょうとうや))	Takashi Kawabata	Seishi Minakami	Kazuo Takigawa	January 22, 2009
17	17	"The Power of God (Archangel)"; Transliteration: "Kami no Chikara (Dai Tenshi)" (Japanese: 大天使(かみのちから))	Toshikazu Hashimoto	Seishi Minakami	Yūichi Nihei	January 29, 2009
18	18	"Replica (Impostor)"; Transliteration: "Repurika (Nise-mono)" (Japanese: 偽者(レプリカ))	Hideki Tachibana	Akira Tanizaki	Hideki Tachibana	February 5, 2009
19	19	"Last Order (The End)"; Transliteration: "Rasuto Ōdā (Uchidome)" (Japanese: 打ち止め(ラストオーダー))	Tsuyoshi Yoshimoto	Masanao Akahoshi	Minoru Ōhara	February 12, 2009
20	20	"Virus Code (Final Signal)"; Transliteration: "Wirusu・Kōdo (Saishū Shingō)" (Japanese: 最終信号(ウィルス・コード))	Daisuke Takashima	Satoru Nishizono	Kunihisa Sugishima	February 19, 2009
21	21	"Counter Stop (Identity Unknown)"; Transliteration: "Kauntā Sutoppu (Shōtai Fumei)" (Japanese: 正体不明(カウンターストップ))	Shinsuke Yanagi	Satoru Nishizono	Tetsuya Yanagisawa	February 26, 2009
22	22	"Golem (Stone Figure)"; Transliteration: "Gōremu (Sekizō)" (Japanese: 石像(ゴーレム))	Hiroshi Tsuruta	Masanao Akahoshi	Yūichi Nihei	March 5, 2009
23	23	"Friends (Hyōka Kazakiri)"; Transliteration: "Tomodachi (Kazakiri Hyōka)" (Japanese: 風斬氷華(トモダチ))	Hideki Tachibana	Masanao Akahoshi	Yoshitomo Yonetani	March 12, 2009
24	24	"Imaginary Number School District - Five-Element Agency"; Transliteration: "Kyosū Gakku - Gogyō Kikan" (Japanese: 虚数学区・五行機関)	Tamaki Nakatsu	Masanao Akahoshi	Tamaki Nakatsu	March 19, 2009

=== Season 2: II (2010–2011) ===
No. overall	No. in season	Title	Directed by	Written by	Storyboarded by	Original release date
25	1	"The Last Day (August 31)"; Transliteration: "Saigo no Hi (Hachi-tsuki Sanjūichi-nichi)" (Japanese: 8月31日(さいごのひ))	Tamaki Nakatsu	Masanao Akahoshi	Tamaki Nakatsu	October 8, 2010
26	2	"The Book of Law"; Transliteration: "Hō no Sho" (Japanese: 法の書)	Yoshitaka Koyama	Masanao Akahoshi	Michio Fukuda	October 15, 2010
27	3	"The Amakusa Church"; Transliteration: "Amakusa-shiki" (Japanese: 天草式)	Tomohiro Kamitani & Masato Jinbo	Masanao Akahoshi	Tomohiro Kamitani	October 22, 2010
28	4	"Sheol Fear (Voice of the Magicbane)"; Transliteration: "Sheōru Fia (Mametsu no Koe)" (Japanese: 魔滅の声(シェオールフィア))	Makoto Sokuza	Masanao Akahoshi	Kyo Jyumonji	October 29, 2010
29	5	"Lotus Wand"; Transliteration: "Rōtasu Wando" (Japanese: 蓮の杖(ロータスワンド))	Masato Jinbo	Masanao Akahoshi	Yūichi Nihei	November 5, 2010
30	6	"Remnant (Wreckage)"; Transliteration: "Remunanto (Zangai)" (Japanese: 残骸(レムナント))	Mamoru Enomoto	Seishi Minakami	Tsuneo Kobayashi	November 12, 2010
31	7	"Move Point (Coordinate Relocation)"; Transliteration: "Mūbu Pointo (Zahyō Idō)" (Japanese: 座標移動(ムーブポイント))	Masato Jinbo	Seishi Minakami	Masayuki Miyaji	November 19, 2010
32	8	"The Daihasei Festival"; Transliteration: "Daihasei-sai" (Japanese: 大覇星祭)	Shinya Kawatsura	Miya Asakawa	Shinya Kawatsura	November 26, 2010
33	9	"Route Disturb (Pursuit Inhibited)"; Transliteration: "Rūto Disutābu (Tsuiseki Fūji)" (Japanese: 追跡封じ(ルートディスターブ))	Daisuke Tokudo	Miya Asakawa	Daisuke Tokudo	December 3, 2010
34	10	"Shorthand (Stenographic Sourcebook)"; Transliteration: "Shōtohando (Sokki Genten)" (Japanese: 速記原典(ショートハンド))	Tomohiro Kamitani	Miya Asakawa	Tomohiro Kamitani	December 10, 2010
35	11	"Stab Sword"; Transliteration: "Sutabu Sōdo" (Japanese: 刺突杭剣(スタブソード))	Mamoru Enomoto	Kurasumi Sunayama	Kyo Jyumonji	December 17, 2010
36	12	"Belvedere (The Observatory)"; Transliteration: "Beruvedēre (Tenmon-dai)" (Japanese: 天文台(ベルヴェデーレ))	Makoto Sokuza	Kurasumi Sunayama	Yūichi Nihei	December 24, 2010
37	13	"Croce di Pietro (Apostolic Cross)"; Transliteration: "Kurōche di Pietoro (Shito Jūji)" (Japanese: 使徒十字(クローチェディピエトロ))	Masato Jinbo	Kurasumi Sunayama	Michio Fukuda	January 7, 2011
38	14	"City of Water"; Transliteration: "Mizu no Miyako" (Japanese: 水の都)	Tamaki Nakatsu	Masanao Akahoshi	Tamaki Nakatsu	January 14, 2011
39	15	"Queen's Fleet"; Transliteration: "Joō Kantai" (Japanese: 女王艦隊)	Masato Jinbo	Masanao Akahoshi	Yūichi Nihei	January 21, 2011
40	16	"Rosary of the Appointed Time"; Transliteration: "Kokugen no Rozario" (Japanese: 刻限のロザリオ)	Shinya Watada	Masanao Akahoshi	Tetsuya Yanagisawa	January 28, 2011
41	17	"Penalty Game"; Transliteration: "Batsu Gēmu" (Japanese: 罰ゲーム)	Shinya Kawatsura	Seishi Minakami	Shinya Kawatsura	February 4, 2011
42	18	"Serial Number (Specimen Number)"; Transliteration: "Shiriaru Nanbā (Kentai Bangō)" (Japanese: 検体番号(シリアルナンバー))	Kōsuke Kobayashi	Seishi Minakami	Masayuki Miyaji	February 11, 2011
43	19	"The Researcher (Amata Kihara)"; Transliteration: "Kenkyū-sha (Kihara Amata)" (Japanese: 木原数多(けんきゅうしゃ))	Daisuke Tokudo	Seishi Minakami	Daisuke Tokudo	February 18, 2011
44	20	"Hound Dog (Hound Squad)"; Transliteration: "Haundo Doggu (Ryōken Butai)" (Japanese: 猟犬部隊(ハウンドドッグ))	Ayumu Kotake	Masanao Akahoshi	Ayumu Kotake	February 25, 2011
45	21	"Testament (Learning Device)"; Transliteration: "Tesutamento (Gakushū Sōchi)" (Japanese: 学習装置(テスタメント))	Takashi Ikehata	Masanao Akahoshi	Michio Fukuda	March 4, 2011
46	22	"The Divine Retribution Spell"; Transliteration: "Tenbatsu Jutsushiki" (Japanese: 天罰術式)	Masato Jinbo	Masanao Akahoshi	Masato Jinbo	March 11, 2011
47	23	"Prewar"; Transliteration: "Kaisen-mae" (Japanese: 開戦前)	Masato Jinbo	Masanao Akahoshi	Tamaki Nakatsu & Hiroshi Nishikiori	March 25, 2011 (Note: Episode 47 was delayed for one week due to the 2011 Tōhoku earthquake and tsunami)
48	24	"Skill Out (Armed Gang)"; Transliteration: "Sukiru Auto (Busō Shūdan)" (Japanese: 武装集団(スキルアウト))	Shinya Kawatsura	Masanao Akahoshi	Shinya Kawatsura & Hiroshi Nishikiori	April 1, 2011

=== Season 3: III (2018–2019) ===
No. overall	No. in season	Title	Directed by	Written by	Storyboarded by	Original release date
49	1	"Unrest"; Transliteration: "Konran" (Japanese: 混乱)	Yoshiyuki Nogami	Hiroyuki Yoshino	Hiroshi Nishikiori	October 5, 2018
50	2	"The Right Seat of God"; Transliteration: "Kami no Useki" (Japanese: 神の右席)	Yoshiyuki Nogami	Hiroyuki Yoshino	Kiyoko Sayama	October 12, 2018
51	3	"The Document of C"; Transliteration: "Shī Bunsho" (Japanese: C文書)	Hiroshi Nishikiori	Hiroyuki Yoshino	Shingo Yuki	October 19, 2018
52	4	"The Dark Side of Academy City"; Transliteration: "Gakuen-toshi Anbu" (Japanese: 学園都市暗部)	Yoshihiro Mori	Ryunosuke Kingetsu	Yūichi Nihei	October 26, 2018
53	5	"Dark Matter"; Transliteration: "Dāku Matā" (Japanese: 未元物質(ダークマター))	Takashi Kobayashi	Ryunosuke Kingetsu	Kōjin Ochi	November 2, 2018
54	6	"Super-espers"; Transliteration: "Chō Nōryoku-sha-tachi" (Japanese: 超能力者達)	Yoshiyuki Nogami	Ryunosuke Kingetsu	Yūichi Nihei	November 9, 2018
55	7	"The Third Level"; Transliteration: "Dai San Kaisō" (Japanese: 第三階層)	Akihiro Izumi	Kenji Sugihara	Kiyoko Sayama	November 16, 2018
56	8	"Saint Breakout"; Transliteration: "Seijin Kuzushi" (Japanese: 聖人崩し)	Toshikazu Hashimoto	Kenji Sugihara	Toshikazu Hashimoto	November 23, 2018
57	9	"Holy Mother Veneration"; Transliteration: "Seibo Sūhai" (Japanese: 聖母崇拝)	Kazuma Satō	Kenji Sugihara	Kiyotaka Ohata, Kōjin Ochi & Toshikazu Hashimoto	November 30, 2018
58	10	"Sky Bus 365"; Transliteration: "Sukai Basu Sanbyaku Roku-jū Go" (Japanese: スカイバス365)	Yūsuke Onoda	Takahiro Nagase	Hideaki Kurakawa	December 7, 2018
59	11	"British Labyrinth"; Transliteration: "Igirisu Meiro" (Japanese: 英国迷路)	Yoshihiro Mori	Takahiro Nagase	Kiyoko Sayama	December 14, 2018
60	12	"Mercenary"; Transliteration: "Yōhei" (Japanese: 傭兵)	Yoshiyuki Nogami	Hiroyuki Yoshino	Kōjin Ochi	December 21, 2018
61	13	"Curtana Original"; Transliteration: "Katēna=Orijinaru" (Japanese: カーテナ＝オリジナル)	Yuki Morita	Hiroyuki Yoshino	Kiyotaka Ohata & Kōhei Hatano	December 28, 2018
62	14	"Heroes"; Transliteration: "Eiyū-tachi" (Japanese: 英雄達)	Yūsuke Onoda & Shigeki Awai	Hiroyuki Yoshino	Takashi Watanabe & Kōjin Ochi	January 11, 2019
63	15	"Spark Signal"; Transliteration: "Supāku Shigunaru" (Japanese: 迎電部隊(スパークシグナル))	Yoshihiro Mori & Akihiro Izumi	Tsuyoshi Tamai	Tomoyuki Kurokawa	January 18, 2019
64	16	"The Governing Board"; Transliteration: "Tōkatsu Riji-kai" (Japanese: 統括理事会)	Toshikazu Hashimoto	Tsuyoshi Tamai	Toshikazu Hashimoto	January 25, 2019
65	17	"DRAGON"; Transliteration: "Doragon" (Japanese: 怪物(ドラゴン))	Masahiro Shinohara	Tsuyoshi Tamai	Masahiro Shinohara	February 1, 2019
66	18	"The Alliance of Independent Nations"; Transliteration: "Dokuritsu Gokudōmei" (Japanese: 独立国同盟)	Yoshihiro Mori	Ryunosuke Kingetsu	Shingo Yuki	February 8, 2019
67	19	"Misaka Worst"; Transliteration: "Misaka Wāsuto" (Japanese: 番外個体(ミサカワースト))	Masato Miyoshi & Shigeki Awai	Ryunosuke Kingetsu	Kōjin Ochi	February 15, 2019
68	20	"A Reason to Protect"; Transliteration: "Mamoru Riyū" (Japanese: 守る理由)	Yoshiyuki Nogami	Ryunosuke Kingetsu	Takashi Watanabe	February 22, 2019
69	21	"The Star of B'Tselem"; Transliteration: "Betsurehemu no Hoshi" (Japanese: ベツレヘムの星)	Yoshihiro Mori & Kouzou Kaihou	Tsuyoshi Tamai	Yūichi Nihei	March 1, 2019
70	22	"Angel Power (Gabriel)"; Transliteration: "Tenshi no Chikara (Gaburieru)" (Japanese: 天使の力(ガブリエル))	Yūsuke Onoda	Tsuyoshi Tamai	Shingo Yuki & Hiroshi Nishikiori	March 8, 2019
71	23	"Fuse=Kazakiri"; Transliteration: "Hyūzu=Kazakiri" (Japanese: ヒューズ＝カザキリ)	Shigeki Awai	Tsuyoshi Tamai	Kōjin Ochi, Kouzou Kaihou & Hiroshi Nishikiori	March 15, 2019
72	24	"List of Prohibited Books (Index)"; Transliteration: "Indekkusu" (Japanese: 禁書目録(インデックス))	Yoshiyuki Nogami & Kentarō Suzuki	Hiroyuki Yoshino	Kentarō Suzuki	March 22, 2019
73	25	"Wings"; Transliteration: "Tsubasa" (Japanese: 翼)	Yoshihiro Mori	Hiroyuki Yoshino	Shingo Yuki & Hiroshi Kawashima	March 29, 2019
74	26	"Son of God"; Transliteration: "Kami no Ko" (Japanese: 神の子)	Katsushi Sakurabi & Yoshiyuki Nogami	Hiroyuki Yoshino	Hiroshi Nishikiori & Katsushi Sakurabi	April 5, 2019

== OVAs ==
=== A Certain Magical Index-tan ===
A Certain Magical Index-tan (とある魔術の禁書目録(インデックス)たん) is an original video animation series included in the Japanese release of the first and fifth Blu-ray and DVDs of each season of A Certain Magical Index, which features a chibified Index and parodies of events that take place in the series.

No. overall	Original release date
1	January 23, 2009
Tōma Kamijō meets Index-tan, a chibified version of Index, hanging on his balcony, but she gets captured by a bird; Aisa Himegami pick-ups a palmtop tiger kitten, referencing Taiga Aisaka; Index-tan promotes Shakugan no Shana-tan; Komoe Tsukuyomi summons a "cute" angel during a ritual; Kaori Kanzaki angrily avoids questions about herself and her voice actress; Tōma gets puked by Index-tan as he tries to negate the spell in her mouth; While fighting Index in her John's Pen mode, Tōma tells Stiyl Magnus and Kaori to stop being as side characters; Motoharu Tsuchimikado and Pierce Aogami market a cleaning robot on air; and Aisa asks Komoe for some meat as the latter keeps on eating them. Before every new sketch is an intermission by Mikoto Misaka encouraging the viewers to conserve power. A post-credits scene shows Tōma and Index-tan going to a public bath when she asks about nasi goreng dish.
2	June 26, 2009
Index-tan dodges a bird while hanging on the balcony of Tōma's apartment but is caught by a cat instead; During their fight, Accelerator blushes when Tōma slaps his hand away from him; Tōma freaks out when he sees Komoe's car running without her on the driving seat; A childish Sherry Cromwell draws on the ground with chalk; Tōma questions Index-tan and Hyōka Kazakiri's mumbling singing; Kaori states Sasha Kreutzev's power when a marlin jumps out of the water; Index-tan talks with Tōma about his voice actor's blog; and the Sisters blow up Academy City's wind turbines as Accelerator proudly states his voice actor's win for a rookie award at Seiyu Awards while manipulating plasma in the air. Before every new sketch is an intermission by Aisa talking about her limited role and other thoughts. A post-credits scene shows Mikoto and the Sisters promoting the anime adaptation of A Certain Scientific Railgun manga series, and Aisa getting an opportunity to talk about herself.
3	January 26, 2011
Index-tan behaves like a certain squid girl when she gets caught by a cat while hanging on the balcony of Tōma's apartment; Tōma follows Sphinx as they look for a kidnapped Index-tan, only to find the cat from Tantei Opera Milky Holmes; A kidnapped Index-tan laments about the youth finding the celebration of Bon Festival unpopular, while her kidnapper Ōma Yamisaka plays the lyre; Ruiko Saten is seen doing her routines at night while the Remnant incident takes place; During their fight, Agnese Sanctis is dismayed with Stiyl littering his cigarette; Agnese, appearing in her chibi form, complains about being chibified; Kuroko Shirai notices the flowers on Kazari Uiharu's head are getting cuter; and Kaori beats the Knights of England, with Tōma getting caught in her rampage. She apologizes for being "drunk" and will offer him her body as an atonement; Misaka 10032 is seen in a dark room playing a computer game; and Aisa and Komoe are acknowledged for being absent during this episode with a laugh track.
4	June 22, 2011
Tōma finds Index-tan hanging on his apartment's balcony, only to punch her away; Accelerator brags his new award related to voice acting with Amata Kihara, with Kuroko appearing to mention her voice actress' award as well; After Tōma accidentally unhooked Aisa's bra, Seiri Fukiyose brags about wearing a front-hooked bra, causing a celebration among their class; Aisa is unable to eat meat due to Index-tan snatching them; Misaka 10032 and other Sisters provides commentary while playing a little sister game; Awaki Musujime teleports otakus as shields against Mikoto; Misaka 10032 introduces Virtual Boy to Last Order; Kuroko and Kazari discuss how to make A Certain Magical Index anime series popular around the world; and Tōma comments how the writers are running out ideas for Index-tan. Before every new sketch is an eyecatch featuring Itsuwa saying, "Go ahead".
5	August 28, 2013
See A Certain Magical Index-tan: The Movie – The Miracle of Endymion... Happened, or Maybe Not
6	December 26, 2018
Tōma and Index-tan talk about how long this episode has been released since the last one; Index-tan is carried away by the wind as Tōma and Itsuwa ride a tricycle; With Index-tan missing, Itsuwa ominously takes this chance to be with Tōma alone; Tōma and Index discuss how voice actors age and might be replaced in a long run; A dieting Terra of the Left says out loud the ingredients of bread and cookies before casting his spell towards Tōma and Itsuwa; A segment called "Accel-san" features Accelerator using his knowledge to solve problems presented by Teitoku Kakine; Another segment called "Left-san" features Terra using knowledge to solve problems, particularly about who ate Tōma's manju; and Tōma and Index-tan talk about how there is a little change to the protagonist of a new sequel 10 years after its first release. Before every new sketch is a "Who's that Pokémon?"-type eyecatch.
7	April 30, 2019
Tōma and Index-tan talk about how this episode will be the last one for Index-tan series; Shizuri Mugino only utters Shiage Hamazura's last name; After saving a kidnapped girl, Accelerator iterates that he is a villain as she keeps telling him that he is a good guy; Index guesses pictures with sharp teeth by answering "Terra"; Lessar questions how her name is related to "lesser"; In the "Accel-san" segment, Accelerator and Last Order talk about mochi; Lola Stuart is disappointed for a limited screen time in this series; Index-tan discusses different types of fish; The Knight Leader uses his Spell of Thororm to change everything to zero; and Tōma and Index-tan discuss the end of Index-tan series.
