= The Only Thing I Ever Wanted =

- Cover art by Galia Durant

Studio album by Psapp
- Released: June 6, 2006
- Recorded: 2006
- Genre: Electronic
- Length: 41:48
- Label: Domino
- Producers: Carim Clasmann, Galia Durant

Psapp chronology
Tiger, My Friend (2004)	The Only Thing I Ever Wanted (2006)	The Camel's Back (2008)

Professional ratings
Aggregate scores
Source	Rating
Metacritic	70/100
Review scores
Source	Rating
AllMusic	4/5 stars

The Only Thing I Ever Wanted is the second album by Psapp.

== Track listing ==
All tracks are written by Carim Clasmann and Galia Durant at Fishtank Studios, London.

No.	Title	Length
1.	"Hi"	3:56
2.	"King of You"	4:16
3.	"This Way"	3:20
4.	"Needle And Thread"	4:21
5.	"New Rubbers"	3:43
6.	"Tricycle"	2:49
7.	"Hill of Our Home"	5:29
8.	"The Words"	3:38
9.	"Make Up"	2:21
10.	"Eating Spiders"	4:16
11.	"Upstairs"	3:47

== Personnel ==
Psapp

- Carim Clasmann
- Galia Durant

Additional personnel

- Markus Liebetanz - drums, "Hi" and "Hill of Our Home"
- Ben Eshmade - French horn, "This Way" and "Upstairs"
- Gwen Cheeseman - violin, "This Way"
- Sybarite - samples, "King of You"
- Pete Norman - mastering

== Notes ==
- As an example of Psapp's use of found sounds, some of the sounds used on "Needle and Thread" include:
  - The bass drum sound is made of two cardboard boxes; one wet, one dry.
  - Some of the additional percussion sounds are "bits of wood being hit together."
  - The low rattling at the end of the song is Durant's mother's garden table.
  - The repeated melody throughout is a kalimba.
  - A Rhodes piano.
  - Another thumping sound was made with drumsticks banging on the couch.
  - Kitchen utensils.
- The sound samples used for "Upstairs" were recorded at Clasmann and Durant's shared flat shortly before it was demolished. The pair "spent hours recording the creak of the floorboards and the dry electricity of the carpet. They knocked on the hollow spaces in the walls; they stomped up the staircase."

== Reception ==
Pitchfork describes the album as "cuddly electronic indie pop". Salon describes the beats as "too busy", flagging single "Tricycle" as an exception.
