= Tiger, My Friend =

- Cover art by Galia Durant

Studio album by Psapp
- Released: November 2, 2004
- Recorded: 2004
- Studio: Fishtank Studios, London
- Genre: Electronic
- Length: 41:06
- Label: Domino
- Producer: Carim Clasmann, Galia Durant

Psapp chronology
Buttons and War EP (2004)	Tiger, My Friend (2004)	The Only Thing I Ever Wanted (2006)

Original Cover
- The original Leaf Label cover of Tiger, My Friend

Professional ratings
Aggregate scores
Source	Rating
Metacritic	78/100
Review scores
Source	Rating
AllMusic	link
Rockfeedback	link
Stylus Magazine	link

Tiger, My Friend is the debut studio album by English electronic music duo Psapp. It was originally released on The Leaf Label and was later reissued by Domino Records, which now controls Psapp's entire catalog.

== Reception ==
Gemma Padley in a review for BBC called it a "highly skillful album but not one for the masses", and said, "the unfussy quirky instrumentation and simple cylindrical melodic fragments create an intensity bubbling just below the surface. Every tiny fragment is carefully placed creating uniquely woven canvases".

== Track listing ==
All tracks are written by Psapp, except where noted.

No.	Title	Writer(s)	Length
1.	"Northdown Flat B1"		0:31
2.	"Rear Moth"		3:56
3.	"Leaving in Coffins"		4:13
4.	"Calm Down"	Psapp, Tim Whelan	4:21
5.	"Velvet Pony"		3:48
6.	"About Fun"		3:42
7.	"Caruncula"		5:45
8.	"King Kong"		4:10
9.	"The Counter"		3:51
10.	"Chapter"		2:40
11.	"Tiger, My Friend"		4:03

== Personnel ==
Psapp

- Carim Clasmann
- Galia Durant

Additional personnel

- Shawn Lee - drums, "Rear Moth"
- Matt Wasser - beer can, "Tiger, My Friend"
- Splodge the cat - squeaks, "About Fun"

== Notes ==
- Several of the tracks were originally available on EPs released earlier by the band:
  - "Caruncula" was on the Japanese Northdown mini album, as "Curuncula".
  - "Calm Down" was on Do Something Wrong.
  - "Velvet Pony" and "About Fun" were on Buttons and War.
- "Leaving in Coffins" has been released under the titles "Electricity In Pine Boxes" and "Attention Tokyo."
