= By hook or by crook (disambiguation) =

"By hook or by crook" is an English phrase meaning "by any means necessary".

By hook or by crook may also refer to:

== Films ==
- By Hook or Crook (film) -1918 American silent comedy film.
- I Dood It - 1943 musical comedy film known by its UK title of By Hook or by Crook.
- Hook a Crook - 1955 American short film.
- By Hook or by Crook (1980 film) - a Hong Kong kung fu film.
- By Hook or by Crook (2001 film) - an American queer buddy film.
- Ek Aur Ek Gyarah: By Hook or by Crook - 2003 Hindi comedy film by Indian director David Dhawan.

== TV Episodes ==
- By Hook or Crook - The 1984 10th episode of season 8 of the American romantic comedy drama The Love Boat.
- By Hook or Crook - The 1993 54th episode of season 9 of the British police procedural The Bill
- By Hook or Crook - The 1995 18th episode of season 2 of the American coming-of-age sitcom Boy Meets World.
- .By Hook or Crook - The 2018 7th episode of season 9 of the American police procedural Blue Bloods.

== Books ==
- American title of the 1946 novel The Spinster's Secret by Anthony Gilbert
- By Hook or by Crook; A Journey in Search of English - a 2007 book by British linguist David Crystal.

== Music ==
- By Hook or by Crook - A 1988 single by American R&B singer Marv Johnson.
- By Hook or by Crook - A 2010 album by English folk band The Bad Shepherds.

== Board Games ==
- Hoity Toity - a multiplayer board game known in the US as By Hook or by Crook.

== See also ==
- By any means necessary - A similar phase
- Shepherd's crook - A type of stick that is part of one of the theories on where the phase originates.
- Pyecombe hook - A type of Shepherd's crook crafted in the English village of Pyecombe in Sussex.
