= Seattle Queer Film Festival =

LGBTQ film festival in Seattle, USA

Seattle Queer & Trans Film Festival
- Location: Seattle, WA
- Founded: 1996
- Founded by: Skylar Fein
- Hosted by: Three Dollar Bill Cinema
- Website: Festival Website

Seattle Queer & Trans Film Festival is an annual film festival in Seattle, produced by the nonprofit Three Dollar Bill Cinema. It is the largest LGBTQIA+ film festival in the Pacific Northwest, showing films at the Broadway Performance Hall and Erickson Theater.

For the 2024 event, the festival offered a fully hybrid experience where participants could attend in-person, or stream the content virtually. For the 2025 event, the festival announced a partnership with Scarecrow Video that allowed for the inclusion of content that highlighted local films and filmmakers.

== History ==
The Seattle Queer Film Festival was founded in 1996 as the Seattle Lesbian & Gay Film Festival. In 2016, it was renamed TWIST: Seattle Queer Film Festival. In 2019, the word "Twist" was dropped and the festival became the Seattle Queer Film Festival.

TRANSlations: Seattle Trans Film Festival (TRANSlations) was launched in 2006 as one of few film festivals focused on films by and about transgender people. The festival began as part of the Gender Odyssey Conference but grew into an independent festival.

In April 2025, it was announced that the Seattle Queer Film Festival and TRANSlations: Seattle Trans Film Festival were merging to become the Seattle Queer & Trans Film Festival.

As of 2026, the festival is going on an indefinite hiatus. In an interview with The Seattle Times, Three Dollar Bill Cinema's board president, Lindy Boustedt shared that since 2023, the organisation had accumulated $70,000 in debt. Through the help of supporters, the organisation was able to break even. In efforts to not go back into the red, the organisation will pause both the Seattle Queer Film Festival and TRANSlations for the time being. Instead, the organisation is shifting towards holding more frequent experiences to stay active year-round.

== Films ==
The 2025 festival included 17 films:

- 1946: The Mistranslation That Shifted Culture. Director: Sharon "Rocky" Roggio (USA)
- Appropriate Behavior. Director: Desiree Akhavan (USA)
- Beautiful Thing. Director: Hettie Macdonald (UK)
- Big Eden. Director: Thomas Bezucha (USA)
- By Hook or By Crook. Director: Harry Dodge and Silas Howard (USA)
- Golden. Director: Kai Stänicke (Germany)
- Night Train. Director: Jerry Carlsson (Sweden)
- Of Hearts and Castles. Director: Ruben Navarro (USA)
- Outdoors. Director: John Mark Fitzpatrick (UK)
- Portrait of a Lady on Fire. Director: Céline Sciamma (France)
- Rafiki. Director: Wanuri Kahiu (Kenya)
- Rubber Dolphin. Director: Ori Aharan (Israel)
- Saving Face. Director: Alice Wu (USA)
- Song Lang. Director: Leon Le (Vietnam)
- Tangerine. Director: Sean Baker (USA)
- The Happy Sad. Director: Rodney Evans (USA)
- Were the World Mine. Director: Tom Gustafson (USA)
