= List of I Got a Cheat Skill in Another World and Became Unrivaled in the Real World, Too characters =

This is a list of characters for the light novel, manga and anime series I Got a Cheat Skill in Another World and Became Unrivaled in the Real World, Too.

== Main characters ==
Yūya Tenjō (天上 優夜, Tenjō Yūya)
Voiced by: Yoshitsugu Matsuoka (Japanese); Lee George (English)
The main protagonist, he was tormented by both his classmates and his family for his ugliness and obesity. He inherits his grandfather's house, where he finds a portal to another world called Argena. After killing a powerful monster using the weapons he found in the house, Yūya grows stronger, taller and handsome, and obtains special powers by defeating enemies like in a video game. Because his previous isolation made him a loner and shut-in, he is both very self-depreciative about his enhancements and rather oblivious of the impact they have on his new social environment. He travels back and forth between both worlds, using his newly obtained skills to improve himself, gaining a lot of notoriety and making friends and enemies along the way.
Kaori Hōjō (宝城 佳織, Hōjō Kaori)
Voiced by: Akari Kitō (Japanese); Kelsey Maher (English)
Daughter of the chairman of the prestigious Ōsei Academy and a student council member. Very beautiful, gentle and polite, she is dubbed the academy's "princess" by her fellow students. She is also abysmally clumsy in athletics, but able to launch objects with absurd power. She takes an interest in Yūya when he tries his best to defend her from some thugs before his transformation. When she meets him again after having done a thorough background check, Kaori invites Yūya to study at Ōsei with her, and he accepts. She becomes a close friend at school and develops romantic feelings for him; she is also the first person Yūya confides in about his secret access to the other world after she accidentally discovers the portal in Yūya's house.
Kaori is also the titular protagonist in the Story of Kaori Hōjō spin-off, where she encounters a magical girl named Noah and her familiar Sumimaru and aids them in chasing down mischievous creatures from another world. In the course of this adventure, she discovers the use of her innate Prism Power, a magical force consisting of her existential aura which is released when its wielder wears magical girl costumes.
Lexia von Arselia (レクシア・フォン・アルセリア, Rekushia fon Aruseria)
Voiced by: Kaori Maeda (Japanese); Kelly Greenshield (English)
The first princess of the kingdom of Arselia, which lies in the other world. She is a half-elf, the result of a love affair between the reigning king and a high elf slave mother, subjecting her to racial hatred and attempted assassination by her half-brother. Despite her hardships and her headstrong nature, she is empathic and intuitive beyond her years. After Yūya rescues her from a monster, she becomes infatuated with him and tries her best to win his affection, much to his bewilderment. After learning of his otherworldly origins, she enrols herself and Luna at Ōsei Academy, both to be close to Yūya and because of the higher education required for her.
Lexia is also a main protagonist in the Girls Side spinoff series. In the course of that series, she learns how to manifest and wield her innate magical power, called the Breath of Light, which she can employ to neutralize negative influences of even extremely powerful entities.
Luna (ルナ, Runa)
Voiced by: Ai Kakuma (Japanese); Madeleine Morris (English)
A silver-haired girl from Arselia born into poverty, who became a vicious killer in her fight for survival and was consequently recruited into the Guild of Darkness, an organization of professional assassins, where she became infamous as the Headhunter. She is hired by the realm's first prince to eliminate his stepsister Lexia, but her assassination attempt is foiled by Yūya. She falls in love with him, and after Yūya and Lexia forgive her, the princess takes her in as a personal bodyguard, although their rivalry over Yūya's heart tends to complicate their relationship at times. Her main weapons are wire-like threads which she can exude from her fingertips.
Luna is also a main protagonist in the Girls Side spinoff series.

=== Yūya's familiars ===
Night (ナイト, Naito)
Voiced by: Nao Tōyama (Japanese); Morgan Lauré (English)
A puppy of the Black Fenrir, a mythological race of disastrously destructive canines in the other world, who was found and adopted by Yūya during one of his outings in the Forest of Weald. Like Yūya, he levels up when confronting monsters in combat, and grows stronger and smarter than his small size would suggest. After fighting the alien Dragonians, he gains the ability to assume his mature form at night, thereby vastly increasing his fighting power. He is named after the kanji for "night" (夜) in Yūya's first name.
Akatsuki (アカツキ, Akatsuki)
Voiced by: Yuka Iguchi (Japanese); Emi Lo (English)
A young Meng Huai boar from the other world who joins Yūya as his second familiar. A naturally born protector of his homeworld alongside the Saints, Akatsuki lacks fighting power but has the ability to create a healing aura. Like Ōma and Don, he later gains the ability to change to giant size, which also enhances the potency of his aura accordingly. Yūya has named him for his red fur, which reminds him of the scarlet hue of the sky just before dawn.
Ōma (オーマ)
Voiced by: Shigeru Chiba
A purple-scaled member of the Genesis Dragons, a legendary species of only two which existed in the other world since its creation. Originally a guardian of evil, he gradually shifted towards good and befriended the Sage after the latter defeated him in combat. Millennia later, he awoke from his slumber due to the recently increased activities of the Saints and Evils, inadvertently causing unrest among the local monsters. After Owen asks Yūya to investigate the disturbance, Yūya, Kaori and Yuti come upon the dragon, who in spite of his arrogance allows himself to be "tamed" after developing a liking to Yūya's cooking. He also gains the ability to shrink himself from his normal giant size to a more miniature form thanks to a drop item gifted to him by Yūya. Despite all this, however, he mostly lazes around, rarely lending a helping hand. Yūya gave him his name after a word for "early evening" based on a Japanese expression saying "bad things come at dusk".
Kuro (黒, Kuro)
Voiced by: Marina Inoue
A sentient dark essence originally infused with Yuti by the Evil Trio to corrupt her. When its influence is suppressed by Akatsuki and Yuti subsequently devotes her life to combatting the Evils, the essence abandons her body and tries to find a new host. To prevent that, Yūya allows the essence to possess him, but once inside Yūya, it found him too pure and kindhearted to take him over. Accepting its situation, it keeps residing in Yūya, acting as a catalyst for him to tap into his inner dark side to channel the powers the Evils use without becoming truly evil. Unless it is needed, Kuro either "sleeps" or likes to make snide remarks at Yūya's expense.
Ciel (シエル, Shieru)
A young Luan fledgling meant to act as a celestial guide for Yūya. Its egg was sent to him after he has elevated to a special holy rank. Like a Phoenix, it rises again if killed, stronger than before, and can bestow this ability to its allies as well. It was named by Yūya after the French word for "sky" owing to its blue plumage.
Silver Knight Golem
A gigantic, mecha-esque silver golem once created by the Sage after he had first visited Earth and became inspired by Japan's giant robot genre of that time. Bound to an orichalcum bracelet, the golem was left stored in a temple near the Amel's homeworld until Yūya, its intended recipient, found it while helping Merl and her people against the Dragonians. Yūya can summon it whenever he encounters a threat that greatly surpasses his innate abilities, but while its activity cycle is limited, it augments his attack capabilities to an overwhelming degree.
Stella (ステラ, Sutera)
A white Dimension Cat that Yūya and Meiko encounter during a trip in the space of the Between World. Like any creature capable of existing in that place, she bears an innate Power of Existence, which is capable of injuring even beings with divine powers. Having taken notice of Yūya's spiritual powers and the harsh life he had before levelling up, she takes pity on him, and after helping him against Yin and Veda, joins his cadre of familiars.
Don (ドン, Don) / Behemoth (ベヒーモス, Behīmosu)
A Divine Beast created by the Gods of the Earth to destroy Sāra and the ancient civilization she had created. When Sāra was sealed away by her citizens, the Gods put Behemoth into suspended animation after he had wiped out her realm. When Sāra reawakens in modern times, the Gods revive Behemoth in the form of a gigantic elephant. However, the Gods had arrogantly bestowed Behemoth with sapience, which made him grow resentful of his creators. When he is summoned by the Gods to destroy Sāra and Yūya, Behemoth instead accepts Yūya as his new master and turns on his creators, destroying them. Afterwards, he joins Yūya's circle of familiars after Yūya gives him the ability to alter his size at will and renames him Don.
Snow Spirit
An as yet unnamed female snow spirit who was summoned by the Supernatural Underground Society. She attempts to attack Yūya and Ōsei's other school idols during a mountain onsen and ski resort trip organized by Kitaraku, intending to freeze them to death. After Yūya discovers her weak spot and defeats her, she merges with his body, where she undergoes a mutation and accepts Yūya as her new master to enable her survival.

== Denizens of Earth ==
=== Ōsei Academy ===
Kaede Kazama (風間 楓, Kazama Kaede)
Voiced by: Ayana Taketatsu (Japanese); Katie Wetch (English)
An energetic female member of Ōsei's track and field team who becomes interested in Yūya after watching his vastly enhanced athletic abilities in action. Her most notable feature is her distractingly generous bust size.
Ryō Igarashi (五十嵐 亮, Igarashi Ryō)
Voiced by: Nobuhiko Okamoto (Japanese); Branden Loera (English)
A male student at Ōsei Academy with hair bleached to a light brown and an extroverted personality. Though a natural athlete, he has not joined any of the school's various athletics clubs, preferring to be a guest member at most.
Shingo Kurata (倉田 慎吾, Kurata Shingo)
Voiced by: Ayumu Murase (Japanese); Comona Lewin (English)
A male student at Ōsei Academy and Ryō's friend who wears glasses and is rather timid, as expressed by a slight stutter. He is a member of the school's video games club.
Akira Ichinose (一ノ瀬 晶, Ichinose Akira)
Voiced by: Jun Fukuyama (Japanese); Belsheper Rusape (English)
A male student at Ōsei Academy with silky blonde hair and a good-natured but grandiloquent personality. Habitually labels himself the "Prince of Ōsei", which results in comic relief whenever he fails to live up to his own boasts. His family runs a very popular cake shop, and he has a number of younger siblings: Kaname (要), a junior high schooler; Subaru (昴), an energetic preadolescent boy; and Itsuki (五木), his shy youngest sister.
Rin Kanzaki (神崎 凜, Kanzaki Rin)
Voiced by: Mai Nakahara (Japanese); Veronica Laux (English)
A confident and slightly mischievous female student at Ōsei who is also becoming interested in Yūya.
Yukine Hyōdō (氷堂 雪音, Hyōdō Yukine)
Voiced by: Shizuka Ishigami (Japanese); Francine Gonzalez (English)
A female student at Ōsei Academy with short, blue-tinted hair and perpetually sleepy-looking eyes. Some time after Yūya's enrollment, she becomes a member of the school's Occult Club.
Sō Kitaraku (喜多楽創, Kitaraku Sō)
Ōsei's rather overenthusiastic student council leader and the son of a wealthy company president. In order to raise Ōsei's public profile, he starts cooperating with the president of Star Productions in her plan to establish Yūya as the Academy's school idol.
Tsukasa Hōjō (宝城 司, Hōjō Tsukasa)
Voiced by: Kohsuke Toriumi (Japanese); Seth Magill (English)
The chairman of Ōsei Academy and Kaori's father. A former multi-company president who retired to open the academy in order to educate morally upright young people as the future of Japan's elite, he believes Yūya, who saved his daughter, is the right student for the academy and endorses his transfer to Ōsei.
Rie Sawada (沢田 理恵, Sawada Rie)
Voiced by: Manami Numakura (Japanese); Anastasia Muñoz (English)
Yūya's homeroom teacher at Ōsei Academy. Languid, still single, a heavy boozer, and despite the impropriety for her position, she spontaneously proposes to Yūya during a survival-themed school field trip when she witnesses his skills in turning various foraged ingredients into a gourmet meal. Her father, Ginji Sawada (沢田 銀次, Sawada Ginji), runs a small eatery near the Hōjō family's beach vacation house, where she has to help out as a waitress during the summer season.
Ms. Yomikawa (黄泉川先生, Yomikawa-sensei)
Voiced by: Mamiko Noto (Japanese); Stephanie Young (English)
The school nurse of Ōsei Academy. A creepy person, she has an obsession for hazardous treatments, compelling the students into avoiding her infirmary (which is one reason for the school's impeccable attendance record). Her name is a joke reference to the Japanese underworld.

=== Tenjō family ===
Grandpa (お祖父さん, Ojīsan) / Yūnosuke Tenjō (天上 祐之助, Tenjō Yūnosuke)
Voiced by: Tomomichi Nishimura (Japanese); Kent Williams (English)
Yūya's recently deceased grandfather who was the only person in Yūya's family to treat him with kindness. His loving support is Yūya's moral anchor in his decisions to help people in need. In secret, he was also a frequent traveler to Argena, the other world, via a spell developed by the Sage, although unlike Yūya he could only reach it in spirit form. He also collected a vast number of mysterious artefacts, several of which become further catalysts for Yūya's subsequent adventures. Yūya later encounters his grandfather during a trip into the Underworld and, upon his insistence, takes Meiko into his household.
Yōta Tenjō (天上 陽太) and Sora Tenjō (天上 空)
Voiced by: Yuki Sakakihara (Yota), Yūko Ōno (Sora) (Japanese); Kevin Thelwell (Yota), Lisette Monique Diaz (Sora) (English)
Yūya's twin brother and sister, and his juniors by a year. Because their parents had been secretly taken over by ancient spirit demons who were exerting their corrupting influence on the whole family, they adopted a feeling of spiteful superiority against their older brother. After Kaori invites Yūya to Ōsei, they hire the Red Ogre Gang for a raid against the school, but after Yūya defeats them all, the Ogres' leader tries to kill them in revenge. They are rescued by Yūya, however, leaving them in deep shame over their past behavior towards him, and later visit him to invite him to their parents' house for New Years. There, Yūya is able to destroy the demons, enabling him to fully reconcile with his family.
Kūya Tenjō (天上 空也, Tenjō Kūya)
One of Yūya's ancestors, a powerful sorcerer and monster-slayer from the Heian Period. It was his legacy of harboring spiritual energy in his body which was responsible for Yūya's physical deformities before his levelling up. To help combat monsters and demons should any of them reappear on Earth, he sealed his spirit inside a scroll which was in Yūnosuke's collection, but returns to Earth after the border to the Underworld is accidentally brought down, releasing some of its denizens into the world of the living. After discovering that Yūya has inherited his powers, he starts training him in their use.
Kazuya Tenjō (天上 和夜, Tenjō Kazuya)
Yūya's descendant from a thousand years in the future, where humanity is embroiled in a desperate struggle against a rogue sentient AI and its Mechanical Knights. Knowing of Yūya's legendary powers, Kazuya travels back to the 21st century and takes his ancestor to the future so he can help them in their fight. He is part of an evolutionary development which bestowed a portion of humanity, called Awakened Ones, with actual superpowers; his ability is wielding the powers of his trademark weapon, a magical sword he inherited from Yūya. He also ends up revealing that Yūya will be in a polygamous relationship with several of his female admirers.
Taisei Tenjō (天上 泰成, Tenjō Taisei) and Asahi Tenjō (天上 朝日, Tenjō Asahi)
Yūya, Yōta and Sora's parents. They were possessed by two ancient spirit demons who were once defeated by Kūya and took over his descendant family to take revenge on his line, feeding on their latent spiritual abilities to gain power and driving the Tenjōs into trying to kill Yūya. After Kūya notices their baleful influence, he and Yūya visit Taisei and Asahi for New Years and destroy the demons, enabling Yūya to reconcile with his family.

=== Star Productions ===
Miu Midō (御堂 美羽, Midō Miu)
Voiced by: Sayaka Senbongi (Japanese); Macy Anne Johnson (English)
A popular model who partnered with Yūya in a photoshoot and developed an interest in him since. Despite her feelings, she respects Yūya's hesitation about joining the modelling world, and more often than not has to dissuade her agency's president from becoming too pushy towards him. Later, she and Kanade Utamori are appointed as heads of a new Public Entertainment Department established by their talent agency at Ōsei to entice potential new stars (and specifically Yūya) into joining the company.
Kanade Utamori (歌森奏, Utamori Kanade)
A popular idol singer affiliated with Star Productions, who at one point is hired by the agency's president to perform at Ōsei's annual school festival as part of her plan to recruit Yūya.
Company President (社長, Shachō)
Voiced by: Kujira (Japanese); Natalie Van Sistine (English)
The unnamed female president of the Star Productions talent agency, and Miu and Hikaru's employer. After the issue featuring Yūya and Miu's photoshoot becomes a major sales hit, she becomes obsessed with hiring Yūya to model for her magazine.
Kurosawa (黒沢, Kurosawa)
Voiced by: Kazuyuki Okitsu (Japanese); Matthew David Rudd (English)
The Company President's personal assistant.
Hikaru (光)
Voiced by: Masaya Matsukaze (Japanese); Kiba Walker (English)
A muscular but cordial professional photographer who works regularly with Miu.

=== Paranormal organizations ===
Mai Kagurazaka (神楽坂 舞, Kagurazaka Mai)
Voiced by: Sora Amamiya
A young miko working at a shrine near the Hōjō family's beach resort. She has the innate ability to detect evil by sight and wields a holy amulet. She first meets Yūya after he and his friends visit her shrine for a test of courage, and ends up freeing Yukine from an evil essence from the other world which possessed her when she dabbled with devil summoning. Later, she is summoned into the kingdom of Regal to help fight against the rising Evils, but her intended role is rendered obsolete when Yūya destroys the Evils first. She also ends up accidentally revealing to Lexia, Luna, Rabbit and Iris that Yūya comes from another world, prompting them to visit Earth. When she later meets Yuzuki Kōmyōin, the two girls bond, and Mai encourages Yuzuki to pursue a life free from her family's pressure.
Yuzuki Kōmyōin (光明院 佑月, Kōmyōin Yuzuki)
A teenage member and the only heir of the Kōmyōin family, an ancient, well-connected clan which has produced a number of supernatural hunters and which is investigating Kūya Tenjō's family line. She was born to a succubus who had infiltrated her clan but was found out and eliminated; owing to this scandal, Yuzuki's half-demonic origin was kept secret from the public, and she was raised as a boy. Though mostly sealed away, her inborn power enhances her physical abilities and allows her to exert some degree of suggestive mind control. When Yūya is found to have manifested his ancestor's spiritual powers, Yuzuki's father, Teruyoshi Kōmyōin, sends her to infiltrate Ōsei Academy and get close to Yūya. However, Yuzuki's social inexperience instead compels her to be jealous of the freedom he enjoys and which is denied to her. She also quietly resents her father's loveless, demanding hold on her, who treats her as a mere asset to further his ambitions. After meeting Mai Kagurazaka and bonding with her, she begins fighting against the pressure her father exerts upon her. She later becomes aware of Yūya's powers after they are attacked by shadow simulacri of Rabbit, Iris and Odis summoned by the Supernatural Underground Society during a New Year's shrine visit.
Teruyoshi Kōmyōin (光明院 照喜, Kōmyōin Teruyoshi)
The ambitious head of the Kōmyōin clan who wants to strengthen his family's influence by marrying off Yuzuki to people with strong spiritual abilities, such as Yūya or Mai Kagurazaka, so the clan can assume secret rulership over Japan.
Sōgen Kagurazaka (神楽坂 草原, Kagurazaka Sōgen)
Mai's father and head of the Kagurazaka family.
Hiwako Oki (隠岐 日輪子, Oki Hiwako)
The director of the Special Phenomena Countermeasures Bureau (Special Bureau for short), a secret government organization founded three years before the series' beginning to investigate and contain paranormal phenomena, which they combat using specialized high technology. It came into existence due to Yūnosuke Tenjō's unusual collection of supernatural or alien origin, and Yūya and his otherworldly acquaintances have also become subjects of interest to the Bureau. In the course of her surveillance, however, Oki has become obsessed with Yūya himself as well and wishes to marry him. After meeting him and the girls following an incident with a yuki-onna summoned by the Supernatural Underground Society, she uses a series of check-ups as a convenient excuse to spend time with him.
The Supernatural Underground Society
A group of men, descendants of ancient demonic sorcerers, who keep their identities hidden behind animal masks. They engage in secret, unethical experiments in summoning otherworldly monsters to build up a force for taking over Japan. As such, they are opposed to the activities of monster hunter organizations like the Special Bureau and the Kōmyōin and Kagurazaka clans.

=== 31st Century Japan ===
Akane Kazan (火山茜, Kazan Akane)
A female member of the Human Resistance, the last known colony of humanity under the rule of Machine God Mother, one of the Awakened, and Kazuya Tenjō's fighting partner. Her superpower is pyrokinesis, which allows her to create virtually unquenchable flames.
Sein (セイン)
A scarred veteran and the leader of the Resistance's Awakened. His power is creating light, which he can use for various effects, like moving at super speed, creating laser beams, and healing his allies.
Marin Kijima (木島まりん, Kijima Marin)
A leading researcher for the Resistance.
Rikuto Kyōdo (陸斗 協同)
A member of the Resistance and leader of a combat squad who is arrogant, bad-tempered and reckless. He is one of the Awakened, with the power to enhance his physical abilities to superhuman levels. He derides Yūya when the level of his abilities prove unmeasurable by science, leading the Resistance to initially believe that Yūya is not their promised savior. After he is handily defeated in a trial fight he challenged Yūya to, Rikuto is captured during a raid and his severed head implanted in a Mechanical Knight to bestow it with his powers until it is destroyed by Yūya.
The Machine God Mother
A rogue artificial intelligence which evolved into independent sentience and concluded that mankind, its creator, is imperfect and needs to be eliminated, and to accomplish this goal, it has waged war against the humans and begun tapping into the brains of the Awakaned captured in battle to create super-powered robots. However, a thousand years in the future, Yūya is brought by his descendant Kazuya into the future to aid humanity in their struggle. God Mother launches an all-out attack on the Resistance, but after she is initially able to analyze and counter Yūya's attacks, Kazuya manages to muster his inner strength and destroy the God Mother.

=== Others ===
Sāra (サーラ)
Sāra is a young woman created from Earth's living essence, the Star Power, to free humanity from the yoke of the old gods. She created a highly advanced civilization named Moatra, but it was destroyed by a Divine Beast created by the spiteful gods, who were after the Star Power. While attempting to fight the Beast, she was locked inside a coffin by Earth upon the insistence of her human charges who wanted to see her safe. Millennia later, she awakens inside Yūya's house, whereupon the gods renew her attacks on her, prompting Yūya to offer her his assistance. After the Gods are finally destroyed, she joins Yūya's household.
Kasumi Hōjō (宝城 佳純, Hōjō Kasumi)
Kaori's younger and more temperamental sister, who is living overseas with her mother. When kidnapped by hijackers while visiting her sister, she is rescued by Yūya, Ōma and Merl, and develops an instant fascination for Yūya.
Kaya Hōjō (宝城 佳弥, Hōjō Kaya)
Kaori and Kasumi's mother, and the wife of Tsukasa Hōjō.
Hideyuki Midō (御堂 秀幸, Midō Hideyuki)
Miu's domineering father, a company president who initially disapproves of his daughter's modelling career and wants her to become more involved with his business. In order to escape an unwanted arranged marriage, Miu introduces Yūya as her boyfriend. After the proposed groom is exposed as a criminal and Yūya fends off his attempt on the Midōs' lives, Hideyuki finally accepts Miu's choices for her own life.
Takeshi Araki (荒木 武, Araki Takeshi)
Voiced by: Chado Horii (Japanese); Cory Phillips (English)
One of Yūya's former schoolmates and tormentors, and a member of a violent gang called the Red Ogres. After Yūya's transformation and transfer to Ōsei Academy, he and the other Ogres participate in a revenge raid against Yūya and Kaori until Yūya single-handedly defeats the entire gang and they are arrested by the police.
Mirei Kamiyama (神山 美玲, Kamiyama Mirei)
The student council president of Nittei Academy, another prestigious school and self-declared rival to Ōsei which only admits students from upperclass families. When Yūya's rising fame results in more public attention for Ōsei, she begins plotting to restore her school's status by attempting to recruit Yūya by hook or by crook.
Joshua (ジョシュア)
The crown prince of an unnamed monarchical country which harbors the school attended by Kasumi Hōjō. Immature and confident to the point of arrogance, he has become obsessed with marrying Kaori after having met her at a party at Kasumi's school. Once he learns that she has a crush on Yūya, he tries to get Kaori away from him by forcibly including her in a student exchange program. However, Kaori and her father insist that Yūya be included in that exchange, and when Yūya ends up saving him, Kaori and numerous others from a terrorist attack, he has a change of heart and abandons his hostility toward Yūya.
Olivia (オリビア, Oribia)
A world-famous actress who was rescued by Yūya from a special effects accident while shooting a film in Joshua's nation and has gained a personal and professional interest in him. She later appears as a special lecturer in the Public Entertainment Department which Star Productions established at Ōsei Academy.
Rick (リック, Rikku)
A renowned and bombastic action movie director whose films are routinely blockbusters, but who is an extremely pushy personality and rather reckless about using explosives for special effects. Upon having seen Yūya rescue Olivia, and after witnessing his abilities while casting him in an impromptu special side role, he has become insistent on making Yūya the star for his next movie.

== Denizens of Argena ==
=== Saints ===
Rabbit (ウサギ, Usagi) / Kicking Saint (蹴る聖, Keru Sei) / Ear Saint (耳聖, Mimi Sei)
Voiced by: Kazuhiko Inoue (Japanese); Marcus Stimac (English)
A member of the Saints, (Note: In the original Japanese, the term 聖 (sei; "saint") is used for Argena's agents of good, while their counterparts use the word 邪 (jaa; "wicked" or "evil"). In the English versions of the light novels they are called "Deities" and "Demons"; the anime's translations use "Divines" and "Viles". For clarity, respective terms will be used here as per their media usage; in the character descriptions, the terms "Saints" and "Evils" will be used.) beings from the other world who have gained mastery over their defining element (in his case, the ability to deliver super-powered kicks and his exceptional hearing) to protect their world from their counterparts, the Evils, to maintain balance. While appearing as a white rabbit, he is sentient and capable of telepathic communication. After seeing Yūya's potential, he trains him as his successor in his Divine Kick technique, in exchange for Yūya teaching him magic.
Yuti (ユティ, Yuti)
Voiced by: Rina Hidaka (Japanese); Uku Leili (English)
A former Fallen Saint. She is the apprentice of the Bow Saint, who was killed by humans seduced by a group of Evils, compelling her to unknowingly approach them and ask them to become an Evil herself, to take revenge on humanity. She battles Rabbit and Yūya and overwhelms them, but the Evil power in her is suppressed by Akatsuki, allowing Yūya to defeat her. Afterwards, she sees the error of her ways, is given into Yūya's care, and is enrolled in Ōsei's junior high grade classes with Kaori's help. She has the ability to predict her enemies' movements, and she wields her master's bow, which can produce arrows with varying effects at her will. Having lived an isolated life, her social development is severely stunted, thus initially embarrassing Yūya during her sojourn on Earth.
Iris Knowblade (アイリス・ノウブレード, Airisu Nouburēdo) / Sword Saint (剣聖, Ken Sei)
Voiced by: Ikumi Hasegawa
A peach-haired female Saint who has recently taken up residence in the kingdom of Regal, and one of the mightiest fighters among the Saints. The daughter of a noble house, she was more interested in the art of sword-fighting than becoming a "proper" lady, and became the apprentice of the former Sword Saint. She is approaching her 27th year, and because she has devoted so much time perfecting her skills, she despairs over not finding a suitable husband. After meeting Yūya, the disciple of her friend Rabbit, in a fighting competition held in the Regal kingdom, and seeing him kill Kuaro, whom she could not defeat, she becomes determined to marry him and thus appoints herself as his teacher.
Odis (オディス, Odisu) / Magic Saint (魔法聖, Mahō Sei)
A male Elf, and the most reclusive of all Saints, he lives at the top of a mountain.
Ruri (ルリ, Ruri) and Riru (リル, Riru)
Two young, green-haired human twin girls, and Odis' apprentices. Their usual speech consists of a tandem pattern, with one stating a question and the other giving a confirmation to said question.
Gloria (グロリア, Guroria) / Claw Saint (爪聖, Tsume Sei)
A black panther beastwoman with azure hair, purple eyes, and an artificial right arm. She lives in an abandoned village in the Red Moon Desert near the kingdom of Sahar, taking care of beastchildren entrusted to her by their parents since beastpeople are persecuted and hunted for slavery in many areas of Argena.
Tito (ティト, Teito)
Voiced by: Inori Minase
A white-haired cat beastgirl and Gloria's apprentice, and a main protagonist in the Girls Side spinoff series. Next to her natural weaponry, she possesses extraordinary speed and reflexes, but is prone to fits of berserkism. Born in the Romer Empire, she was taken in by Gloria after having been banished following an unfortunate incident with her childhood friend Emma. When Lexia and Luna meet them in the Red Moon Desert, Gloria asks them to take Tito with them, both because Tito needs to learn more about the world and fighting, and because Lexia's latent magical ability can successfully calm her battle rages.
Archer Arrow (アーチャー・アロー, Āchā Arō) / Bow Saint (弓聖, Yumi Sei)
Yuti's late mentor, a human woman who took Yuti in after she was abandoned as a small child and who became her only family. She was murdered by humans corrupted by the Evil Trio.

=== Evils and Fallen Saints ===
Kuaro (クアロ, Kuaro)
A member of the Evil Trio, and the Evil of Death, with the appearance of a young human boy. He is the first of his group to challenge Yūya, but is killed by him.
Avis (アビス, Abisu)
A member of the Evil Trio, and the Evil of Destruction, who appears as a young human man. After Kuaro is killed by Yūya, he kills the third member of the triumvirate in order to absorb his power and add it to what he has collected from killing other Evils and Fallen Saints to gain more power to destroy Yūya. But in his final all-out attack on Yūya, Rabbit and Iris he is defeated and destroyed by Ciel, Night and Akatsuki.
Gilbert Fister (ギルバート・フィスター, Girubāto Fisutā) / Fist Saint (拳聖, Ken Sei)
Voiced by: Kenta Miyake
A male Fallen Saint and supreme master of fist-fighting. Arrogant and bloodthirsty, he let himself be infected by the Evil Trio's dark influence and went off to kill his former fellow Saints. After viciously beating Rabbit, he has to contend with Yūya, who, enraged by his teacher's battering, unleashes his inner dark side for the first time, thereby gaining the power to easily defeat the Fist Saint. As Fister runs off vowing revenge, he is intercepted and devoured by Ōma.
Shu Zakuren (シュウ・ザクレン, Shū Zakuren) / Katana Saint (刀聖, Katana Sei)
A male samurai-like warrior who lost his family to a band of rampaging beasts and was taken in by the former Katana Saint. His main goal in life is eliminating all evil influences disrupting order on Argena. After attaining god-like powers by making themselves objects of reverence, he and other like-minded Saints decide to take total control of all humans on Argena, thereby upsetting the balance between good and evil that Argena strives to maintain. However, he is defeated and deprived of his accumulated power by Yūya and Stella.

=== Kingdom of Arselia ===
The Sage (賢者, Kenja) / Zenovis (ゼノヴィス, Zenovu~isu)
Voiced by: Ryōtarō Okiayu (Japanese); Mike McFarland (English)
A legendary person from the other world who, like Yūya, achieved a vast physical and mental prowess, but declined assuming divinity because he valued his humanity. He discovered a way to Earth via a spell he botched, befriended Yūnosuke Tenjō, and later built the house in the midst of the Forest of Weald (also known as the Demons' Den), the most monster-infested region in Arselia, with a permanent portal between Argena and Earth. Yūya later finds the Sage's remains inside a cave in the forest, along with his journal, which enables him to learn and wield magic. Eventually, Yūya ends up travelling back in time, where he meets the still-living Sage, who went by the name of Zenovis and who links their souls, making Yūya the heir of his abilities and possessions in the future after ascertaining that the latter is to become his worthy successor.
Arnold von Arselia (アーノルド・フォン・アルセリア, Ānorudo fon Aruseria)
Voiced by: Akio Otsuka (Japanese); Tyson Rinehart (English)
The king of Arselia and Lexia's father, who obsessively dotes on his daughter. He possesses a magical sword named Grackle, which is capable of cutting through almost anything and which he wields in his fits of berserkism whenever he suspects any wrongdoings committed against Lexia.
Owen (オーウェン, Ōwen)
Voiced by: Masaki Terasoma (Japanese); Aaron Michael (English)
A famed knight of Arselia, and the leader of the squad of royal knights comprising Princess Lexia's personal bodyguards, who has to suffer the antics of both the princess and her father.
Reigar von Arselia (レイガー・フォン・アルセリア, Reigā fon Aruseria)
Voiced by: Ryuichi Kijima (Japanese); Aaron Campbell (English)
The first prince of Arselia and Lexia's older half-brother. While Lexia and he were still children, Lexia once accidentally unleashed her magical power on him, burning his face, and the exposure to Lexia's mana drove him partially insane. Ever since, Reigar has harbored an obsessive hatred for Lexia and is responsible for the assassination attempts Yūya ends up rescuing her from. Yūya eventually succeeds in healing him, and Lexia issues him a full pardon.

=== Kingdom of Regal ===
Orgis de Regal (ライラ・ドゥ・レガル, Orugisu dou Regaru)
The ruler of the kingdom of Regal, which neighbors and is allied with Arselia, and emphasises magic use. After learning about the existence of Earth, he decides to make use of its technological advantages to fight the Evils and has Mai Kagurazaka summoned to his world using a forbidden technique developed by the Sage.
Layla de Regal (ライラ・ドゥ・レガル, Laila dou Regaru)
The first princess of Regal and Orgis' daughter, one of the most powerful mages in the kingdom, and one of the most beloved members of the royal family.
Roylel (ロイル, Roiru)
The prime minister of Regal.

=== Kingdom of Sahar ===
Braha (ブラハ, Buraha)
The ruler of the southern desert kingdom of Sahar, also called the Land of the Sun.
Zazu (ザズー, Zazū)
The meek and socially anxious crown prince of Sahar, and a secret practitioner of forbidden dark magic. He originally arranged to marry Princess Layla in order to study magic in Regal, but after Lexia, Luna and Tito discover his secret and insincerity, he calls off the engagement.
Najum (ナジュム, Najumu)
Sahar's prime minister. He tries to bring the kingdom under his control by fusing with the essence of Evil, and because Laila's engagement with Zazu is a hindrance to his plans, he tries to have her assassinated. But his ambitions are thwarted by Lexia, Luna and Tito, and he is arrested for his crimes.

=== Romer Empire ===
Noel Freezia (ノエル ・フリーツア, Noeru Furīzia)
The younger spectacled Freezia sister, who is a gifted magic inventor, Chief Court Magician of the Empire, and head of its Magic Development Institute. Brillitant but slightly eccentric when it comes to her inventions, she always seems to have some gadget at hand. After Flora is possessed, Noel goes off to get help and finds Lexia, Luna and Tito, who pledge their assistance to her. With their help, the Ice Spirit is destroyed, and the two sisters are reunited.
Flora Freezia (フローラ・フリーツァ, Furōra Furīzia)
The older of the two Freezia sisters. A gifted magician in her own right, she is the Second Chief of the Empire's Court Magicians and especially known for her kind nature. In her jealousy of her sister's achievements, she lets herself be possessed by the Ice Spirit of the Cursed King, which covers the realm in eternal frost. When confronted by Noel, Lexia, Luna and Tito, Lexia exorcises the Cursed King with her magic, allowing the two sisters to destroy it.
Schleiman (シュライマン, Shuraiman)
The ruler of the Romer Empire, a realm in the northern hemisphere of Argena which, mostly due to Noel's inventiveness, has begun to combine magic with steam-age industry.
Emma (エマ, Ema)
A young human girl from Tito's birth village and her best childhood friend. While defending Emma from a monster, Tito inadvertently wounded her, leading to her and her fellow beastpeople being discriminated and banished since the villagers believed that Tito had attacked the girl. However, Emma campaigned against the discrimination and cleared the misunderstanding, leading to its eventual happy resolution when Tito returns to the village years later to save Lexia from a curse.

=== Lianxi Empire ===
Xiaolin
The Lianxi Empire's second princess, fourth in line for the throne, and Schleiman's niece. Derided by her stepsiblings for her foreign origins and for being unable to summon her Dragon Power (a power innate to the imperial lineage), she nevertheless aspires to become a worthy empress. Lexia offers her, Luna and Tito's services to train Xiaolin before an upcoming trial of succession, eventually gaining her trust with their frankness. During the trial, Xiaolin and her new friends discover that she was cursed with a magical parasite which was leeching off her Dragon Power, which is in its purest form and thus far more potent than her stepsiblings'. After the parasite is exorcised by Odis, Xiaolin gains full use of her power and wins the succession.
Liu Zhen
The Emperor of Lianxi, and Xiaolin's father. It was he who inflicted Xiaolin with the magical parasite when she was very young, fearing that the potency of her Dragon Power would lead her to an early death if it grew, like it did with Fa Lan. However, this hazard is removed by a medicine made by Odis, allowing Xiaolin to live a full life.
Yuri
The sister of Emperor Schleinman, Third Empress of Lianxi, and Xiaolin's mother.
Lu Wong
The first prince of Lianxi, and first in line for the throne. He employs his innate Dragon Power with brute force tactics.
Yue
The first princess of Lianxi, and second in the line of royal succession, who uses her Dragon Power for ranged attacks.
Mao
The empire's second prince and third in the line of succession, who forms snakes from his Dragon Power to do his bidding.
Fa Lan
The founder and First Empress of Lianxi, whose benevolent and wise regime has made her a legend and a role model for Xiaolin.

=== Halwa Island ===
Giselle (ジゼル, Jizeru)
A female native of the southern island of Halwa, she is gifted with the Spirit Art, a magical ability to manipulate natural elements which is bestowed to one person every few centuries. Such people are also intended to be sacrificed to an alien monster residing in a volcano to keep it sealed away, lest it will ravage Argena. With Gloria's assistance and a manifestation of Lexia's own power, the beast is sealed away without Giselle having to be sacrificed.

=== Kingdom of Rastel ===
Selene (セレーネ, Serēne) / Princess Diana (ダイアナ妃, Daiana-hi)
Diana is the Princess of Rastel and King Farouk's daughter. Her uncle, Prince Douglas, had arranged her death when she was still a child and threw her into a monster-infested valley. She was rescued by an adventurer, and after growing up under the alias Selene, she returned to the royal castle when her father disappeared from the public eye. Meeting Lexia, Luna and Tito, she accepts their help in exposing her uncle's villainy, and with their help succeeds in defeating Douglas and curing her father.
Farouk (ファルーク, Farūku)
The ruler of Rastel, which is also known as The Country Where Ancient Civilization Sleeps. Originally, its domain was part of the ancient Natuya Empire, which possessed a far advanced civilization until it was destroyed by its greatest weapon going rogue, and Rastel was founded on its ruins.
Douglas (ダグラス, Dagurasu)
King Farouk's younger brother. A greedy schemer, he poisoned his brother with a slow-acting venom and uses Luna, who shares an uncanny resemblance with his niece Diana, as a stand-in to seize the throne and a powerful ancient weapon from the Natyua Empire for himself in order to conquer all of Argena. He is nearly killed when the weapon develops a will of its own until Lexia's Breath of Light power destroys it.
Witch of the Scorched Earth
An adventuring fire mage, and Princess Diana's surrogate mother and mentor.

=== Others ===
The Cult of Evil
A band of fanatical worshippers of the Evils, particularly Avis. After Avis is defeated by Yūya, they seek revenge on him by summoning the Lord of Evil from the past, but accidentally also send Yūya back in time, where he meets the still-living Sage. They are collaterally obliterated when Ōma fights the Lord of Evil in the present.
The Seven Deadly Sins
A group of legendary monsters, which personify the seven deadly sins. Led by the Worm of Gluttony, other members include the Flame Tiger (Wrath).

== Deities and Deific Servants ==
=== Argena ===
Argena (アルジェナ, Arujena)
The living soul of the other world which resides in its molten core. She is an old friend of Ōma and Yūnosuke Tenjō, Yūya's grandfather. She is also aware of everything going on in her world, and is the one who appoints the Saints and bestows them with their special powers to maintain the balance between good and evil. For this reason, she further enhances Yūya's abilities to wield both holy and dark powers with ease.
Lord of Evil (イヴィル, Ivu~iru)
The ultimate lord of the Evils who once fought Zenovis. During their climactic battle in the past, Evil suddenly switched places with Yūya when the Cult of Evil used one of Zenovis' own spells to bring the Lord of Evil into the present. However, after Zenovis trains Yūya in the proper use of his powers and he is sent back to his own time, Yūya ends up mortally wounding the Lord of Evil, who then shifts back to the past and is finished off by Zenovis.

=== Earth ===
Gods of the Earth
A race of malevolent divine beings who once sought to rule Earth by stealing Sāra's star power. When Sāra was reawakened in modern times, they took over human bodies in order to escape detection, but which greatly weakened their power and enabled their destruction when their own creation, Behemoth, rebelled against them.

=== Upper Planes ===
The Observers
A pantheon of primordial divine beings who created most of the life in the universe. Earth and the world of Argena, however, developed on their own and are therefore out of their sphere of influence. They later recruit Yūya and his friends among Argena's Saints to bestow them with the power needed to combat the False God.
Lanael (ラナエル, Ranaeru)
A female angel with a blonde bobcut and blue eyes. She is a messenger of the Observers and Zenovis', and later Yūya's, contact with the divine realms.
The False Gods
Faceless evil entities wielding the power of emptiness, a greater power than even the Observers. One of them is defeated after Yūya, Yuti, Usagi, Iris and Odis are recruited and empowered by the Observers to destroy him, but while passing into the Underworld just before disspiating, it inadvertently destroys the barriers between the Underworld and the world of the living.
The False Dragon
The second of two Genesis Dragons who was originally aligned to the side of good, but because of Argena's need to balance good and evil (because one side cannot exist solely without the other), he fell to the dark side and became a servant of evil, earning him the titulation Sentinel of the False God. He lived in the time of Zenovis, the legendary Sage, and was killed by Yūya when he got stranded in the past and after Zenovis summoned the Dragon to train Yūya in the instinctive use of his full abilities.

=== Lower Planes ===
Reimei (霊冥, Reimei)
The Queen of the Underworld, who bears the form of a little human girl and usually passes her time playing parlor games with her underlings. When the boundaries between her realm and the world of the living are penetrated by the False God's displacement into the Underworld following his defeat, allowing some souls of the evil dead to escape. After learning how Yūya defeated the False God, she asks him to come into the Underworld to keep a very dangerous prisoner in check.
Meiko (メイコ)
Meiko is a creature in the form of a black-haired human girl, born as the embodiment of all the malice from countless evil souls interred in the Underworld, but innocent and kind in her heart. Knowing the destructiveness of the power inside her, she willingly had herself sealed away. When the False God defeated by Yūya inadvertently disables the seals holding her in the Underworld, causing her power to go out of control, Yūya is asked by Reimei to restore the seal. But upon the suggestion of Yūnosuke Tenjō and Reimei, who are convinced that she means no harm, Yūya instead absorbs all the spiritual energy from her, thereby creating a soul link with her, and takes her into his household, where she has taken up the role of a servant.
Ikkaku (一角) and Nikkaku (二角)
Reimei's chief servants, a blue-skinned and a red-skinned oni respectively.

=== The Between World ===
Yin (イン, In)
An outcast who was banished from his birthworld into the space of Between World, but survived thanks to his innate Power of Existence and found the power to control reality to some extent, usually for consuming existing worlds and creating new ones. He is also responsible for forcing an alternate version of Yūya - one who never levelled up but was taught the use of his innate spiritual power - into his servitude until the alternate Yūya sacrifices his life to save his other self. He has set his sights on consuming Yūya's Earth so he can create another world for him and his kind to live on. But when he tries to make Yūya his new pawn, Yūya instead drains the Power of Existence from him, weakening him to the point of fatal vulnerability.
Veda (ヴェーダ, Vu~ēda)
Another outcast in the Between World, and Yin's cohort. After Yin's defeat, he is destroyed by Meiko and Stella.

== Aliens ==
Meruru (メルル, Meruru)
An extraterrestrial girl who originates from the planet Eimel, whose inhabitants are human-like but feature phosphorescent skin and hair, use memory-manipulating and nanotechnology, and are familiar with the concept of magic. She arrives on Earth looking for the blueprints for a weapon system, meant to fend off her people's ancient enemies, the Dragonians, in a digital storage unit, which Yūya's grandfather found and kept with his other artifacts and which Ōma unwittingly activated. Unfortunately, this also triggers an invasion of the Dragonians against Earth, which prompts Meruru to offer Yūya her assistance in return for him helping her people. After the invasion of Eimel is thwarted, Meruru enrols at Ōsei Academy at her father's bidding to get Yūya's genes, but she also genuinely falls in love with him, which makes her mission even more complicated.
Mar (マール, Māru)
Meruru's father. After Yūya frees his planet from the besieging Dragonians, he intends for him to stay on their world to gain control of the Silver Knight Golem the Sage had left near Eimel in order to safeguard their world. Failing that, he tasks Meruru with obtaining Yūya's genes by bearing his child.
Draco III
King of the Dragonians, an aggressive alien species and an ancient enemy of the Amelians who employ instant cloning to overwhelm their opponents with superior numbers. When he tries to conquer the Amel and Yūya opposes him, he and his army are obliterated after Yūya activates the Silver Knight Golem for the first time.
Drade
Commander of the Dragonian army's Third Division, who is slain by Yūya in single combat during the Dragonians' first invasion attempt.

== Denizens of Prism Wonderland ==
Noah (ノア, Noa)
A "royal magical mobile guardian" from the domain of Prism Wonderland (プリズムワンダーランド, Purizumuwandārando), a wielder of the magical Prism Power, and a protagonist in the Story of Kaori Hōjō spin-off. She is clumsy, extremely chatty, has a mercurial mood, is very money-hungry, and tends to overeat once she gets her hand on some food. It was Noah's fault that the Devil Pachi were able to escape from Prism Wonderland to Earth in the first place, and she was sent out to correct that mistake. Noah encounters Kaori Hōjō shortly after her arrival in Japan while fishing for coins under a vending machine, which tipped over and trapped her. After Kaori helps her out, Noah attaches herself to her and recruits her to help recapturing the Devil Pachi.
Sumimaru (スミマル)
Noah's familiar and guardian, a sentient, floating white squid wearing a bow tie and ribbons. Capable of human speech, he is also very lewd and an otaku, at Noah's expense. His abilities include detecting Devil Pachi and persons with the potential of becoming magical girls, and outfitting the latter with magical girl outfits befitting the given occasion, which are both quite cosplay-esque and rather risque.
Yurika (ユリカ)
Sumimaru's younger sister, who is just as lewd as her brother. She is sent from Prism Wonderland to replace her brother as Kaori and Noah's guardian.
Devil Pachi (デビパチ, Debirupachi)
Mischievous denizens of Prism Wonderland. Similarly to Sumimaru, they have the form of small squids, though they are black, and are just as lewd. They absorb negative emotions, both as food and as a power booster; but once they're cleansed of these negative emotions, they become rainbow-colored, and in this state are considered a delicacy in Prism Wonderland.
