= By hook or by crook =

English phrase

"By hook or by crook" is an English phrase meaning "by any means necessary" suggesting that any means possible should be taken to accomplish a goal. The phrase was first recorded in the Middle English Controversial Tracts of John Wycliffe in 1380.

The origin of the phrase is obscure, with multiple different explanations and no evidence to support any particular one over the others. For example, a commonly repeated suggestion is that it comes from Hook Head in Wexford, Ireland and the nearby village of Crooke, in Waterford, Ireland. As such, the phrase would derive from a vow by Oliver Cromwell to take Waterford by Hook (on the Wexford side of Waterford Estuary) or by Crooke (a village on the Waterford side), although Wycliffe's tracts were published at least 260 years before Cromwell. Another is that it comes from the customs regulating which firewood local people could take from common land; they were allowed to take any branches that they could reach with a billhook or a shepherd's crook (used to hook sheep).

The phrase was featured in the opening credits to the 1960s British television series The Prisoner. It appears prominently (as "by hook and by crook") in the short stories "The Snows of Kilimanjaro" by Ernest Hemingway and "The Legend of Sleepy Hollow" by Washington Irving. It was also used as the title of the 2001 film By Hook or by Crook directed by Silas Howard and Harry Dodge. It was also used as a lyric in the chorus of Radiohead's song "Little by Little".
