= Paul Bernon =

American businessman and film producer

- Education: Boston University
- Occupations: Film producer Real estate executive
- Years active: 2004–present
- Partner: Bethenny Frankel (2018–2024)
- Awards: Peabody Award

Paul Bernon is an American businessman and film producer. He won a Peabody Award in 2014 for his film Best Kept Secret.

== Education and real estate career ==
Bernon studied film in college, earning a BS from Boston University. He went on to receive a graduate degree in real estate from New York University. Bernon is the founder and Managing Partner of PMB Ventures, an investment company that focuses on investments in real estate, entertainment, venture capital and sports. The company’s current portfolio includes Rubicon Real Estate, Burn Later Productions, Reggora, Forge, Mingle Mocktails, Pickle4, point.me, Religion of Sports, The Black Dog and WiTricity. He is a co-owner of Angel City FC.

== Film production ==
In 2012, Bernon produced a short film entitled Teacher of the Year that was screened at the Tribeca Film Festival, and now lives on Funny or Die. That year, he also co-founded the independent film production company Burn Later Productions, and executive produced and funded the completion of the documentary Best Kept Secret on the subject of Autism. Following the film, Bernon was named a "visionary leader" for his work advocating for those with disabilities, and awarded a Peabody Award for the work in 2014 as one of the film's executive producers.

One of the first films he financed and executive produced was An Oversimplification of Her Beauty. He then produced the film Drinking Buddies, which was financed with connections he made through his screenings of Teacher of the Year. He also produced the film Adult Beginners in 2015. That year, Bernon was also a producer of the film Results, a feature-length romantic comedy that initially screened at Sundance Film Festival. In 2016, he produced the relationship comedy The Intervention. In 2017, he produced the films Small Crimes and Lemon.

Two of his films, A Kid Like Jake, starring Claire Danes, Jim Parsons, Octavia Spencer and Priyanka Chopra, and Hearts Beat Loud, starring Nick Offerman, Kiersey Clemons, Ted Danson, and Toni Collette, had their world premieres at the 2018 Sundance Film Festival, and were released theatrically in June 2018.

Bernon was also an executive producer on the 2018 film Support the Girls, starring Regina Hall and Haley Lu Richardson. He executive produced Dude (2018). Paul produced Good on Paper, starring Iliza Shlesinger and Ryan Hansen, which was released in 2021. He executive produced the 2022 film I Love My Dad. Most recently, Bernon executive produced the film Mother, May I? in 2023.

Bernon is a member of the Producers Guild of America.
