= Bambi Lake =

American transgender performer and musician

Bambi Lake (October 20, 1950 – November 4, 2020) was an American transgender performer and musician.

== Early life ==
She grew up in California in an Irish Catholic family and was the fourth born of eight children.

== Career ==
In 1971, she joined The Angels of Light, which was an off-shoot of The Cockettes. After being in The Angels of Light she moved to Berlin and worked at Romy Haag's club Chez Romy Haag. During her years in Berlin, she went by the name Beverly Hills. In the mid-70s, she moved back to San Francisco.

In 1977, she became involved with punk. She was friends with Tomata du Plenty and Ginger Coyote and dated Baba Chenelle the drummer for The Zeros. In 1980, she joined the all-girl punk band VS. and with VS.she opened for bands such as X, Dead Kennedys, and Jayne County. On her own she toured with The Stranglers and opened for Black Flag. Henry Rollins said about Bambi Lake " She was the first trans person I ever met on a regular basis. I have known her for more than 30 years. She would go on before Black Flag and lip-synch to Marlene Dietrich tapes. She got the respect because she was more punk than anyone in the building."

In 1996, she wrote a memoir titled The Unsinkable Bambi Lake, published by Manic D Press. In 2005, she released the album "My Glamorous Life As A Broadway Hostess" which contained her most well known song "The Golden Age Of Hustlers" which was covered by Justin Vivian Bond. In 2014 Silas Howard made the short documentary "Sticks & Stones" about Bambi Lake.

In July 2026, a posthumous collection of Lake's poetry was published, titled Devour Me, Again: Collected Poems. The collection was edited by August Bernadicou, with a foreword by Brontez Purnell.

== Death ==
Bambi Lake died from cancer on November 4, 2020. She was 70 years old.
