= Steakhaus Productions =

Independent production company

Steakhaus Productions is an independent production company founded by Steak House and Dominic Ottersbach. It is headquartered in Los Angeles, California. Steakhaus Productions provides comprehensive development, production, post-production, festival and distribution strategies.

Steakhaus Productions debut feature, By Hook or by Crook (film), premiered at Sundance Film Festival in 2002. Steakhaus has produced 20 films and countless media projects including TV series, web series, branded content, commercials and music videos. Our films are currently in distribution with Focus Features, NBC/Universal, Disney, Magnolia, Syfy, IFC, Showtime and many more. Prior to distribution, many of their films had prestigious festival debuts including, Toronto, LAFF, Tribeca, SXSW, Outfest and Sundance. Their most recent productions are Queer for Fear for AMC / Shudder, Launchpad (TV Series) for Disney+ and The Mustang for Focus Features.
