= Queer for Fear =

2022 television documentary series

- Also known as: Queer for Fear: The History of Queer Horror
- Genre: Docuseries
- Directed by: Bryan Fuller (episodes 1–2); Tom Maroney; Sam Wineman
- Starring: Harry Benshoff; Michael Feinstein; Roberto Aguirre-Sacasa; Mark Gatiss; Kimberly Peirce; Karyn Kusama; Peaches Christ; Carmen Maria Machado; Emily St. James; Alonso Duralde; Justin Simien; Leslye Headland; Tommy Pico; Lea DeLaria; Bryan Fuller; Alaska Thunderfuck; Bruce Vilanch
- Composers: ShyBoy; Mark Nubar
- Country of origin: United States
- Original language: English
- No. of seasons: 1
- No. of episodes: 4

Production
- Executive producer: Bryan Fuller
- Producer: Sam Wineman
- Production companies: Shudder; Steakhaus Productions

Original release
- Network: Shudder
- Release: September 30 – October 21, 2022

Queer for Fear: The History of Queer Horror is a 2022 television documentary series from the AMC-owned streaming network Shudder and Steakhaus Productions, executive produced by Bryan Fuller and Steak House.

The series uses interviews with various LGBTQ+ creators to explore LGBTQ+ representation and queer coding in the horror genre throughout history, as well as influences from the Pansy Craze and the Lavender Scare to how 1980s vampire films were influenced by the AIDS epidemic.

The first episode looks at Gothic fiction such as Frankenstein and Dracula and its underlying queer and personal conflict themes; the second considers Pre-Code Hollywood and films made in the early years of the Production Code Administration, especially work by F. W. Murnau, James Whale and Alfred Hitchcock; the third highlights different sub-genres of horror, specifically transformation horror and body replacement; the fourth and final episode discusses the portrayal of lesbians and the predatory female trope.

== Episodes ==
No.	Title	Directed by	Written by	Original release date
1	"Episode 1"	Bryan Fuller	Bryan Fuller	September 30, 2022
Queer gothic writers Mary Shelley, Oscar Wilde, and Bram Stoker invent the horror genre.
2	"Episode 2"	Bryan Fuller	Bryan Fuller	October 7, 2022
Legendary gay director James Whale makes four classics for Universal that paved the way for all Hollywood horror movies after.
3	"Episode 3"	Tom Maroney	Tom Maroney	October 14, 2022
Werewolves and aliens are uniquely queer metaphors.
4	"Episode 4"	Tara Anaïse	Tara Anaïse and Tom Maroney	October 21, 2022
The dangerous queer woman has been terrorizing horror audiences since before the dawn of cinema.
