= List of Majestic Prince characters =

The following is a list of characters from the manga and anime series Majestic Prince.

== Characters ==
=== Team Rabbits ===
Izuru Hitachi (ヒタチ・イズル, Hitachi Izuru)
Voiced by: Hiroki Aiba (Japanese); Houston Hayes (English)^{Ep. 1 credits}
Izuru is the main protagonist and leader of Team Rabbits, piloting the all-around mecha "Red 5". He has black hair.^{Ep. 1} He is a positive thinker whose dream is to become a hero, often mentioning it in his interactions with his teammates. He also loves to draw manga.^{Ep. 1, 2, 3} His pit crew is composed of some mechanics that act together as a family and quickly welcome him.^{Ep. 7} His genetic enhancements give him high concentration.^{Ep. 3, 5:47} Just like the other evolved children, his memories from before joining the military academy were erased.^{Ep. 4} Despite this, Izuru somehow remembers about Teoria, and she mentions that they were very close in the past, unaware that she is actually his biological mother.^{Ep. 20} In the movie, Izuru is entrusted with the enhanced "Red 5 Plus", replacing his previous unit that was destroyed during his battle with Jiart.
Toshikazu Asagi (アサギ・トシカズ, Asagi Toshikazu)
Voiced by: Shintarō Asanuma (Japanese); Corey Hartzog (English)^{Ep. 1 credits}
Toshikazu is the vanguard of Team Rabbits and the oldest member, piloting the attack-oriented mecha "Blue 1". He has blue hair.^{Ep. 1} Asagi is able to process large amounts of data due to his genetic enhancements,^{Ep. 3} Asagi usually assumes command of Team Rabbits when Izuru is unavailable, but he often gets stage fright and an upset stomach.^{Ep. 2} His pit crew is composed of three members that appear to be from the same family; a little girl named Anne who is the Miss Star Rose, her father and her grandfather.^{Ep. 7, 12} It is later revealed that his and Izuru's DNA came from the same person, Commander Simon, making him Izuru's "big brother".^{Ep. 20, 21} In the movie, his unit is destroyed by Diorna and he returns to battle piloting the "White 0", a prototype, multipurpose AHSMB that was proven itself too difficult to pilot, and thus leading to the development of more specialized models, reducing complexity to increase their performance. He ends up sacrificing this unit as well to hold Diorna long enough to be finally defeated.
Kei Kugimiya (クギミヤ・ケイ, Kugimiya Kei)
Voiced by: Yōko Hikasa (Japanese); Genevieve Simmons (English)^{Ep. 1 credits}
Kei is the tactics controller of Team Rabbits, piloting the sensor-oriented "Purple 2".^{Ep. 1} She has long dark blonde hair and a serious look.^{Ep. 1} Her genetic enhancements give her highly developed auditory perception^{Ep. 3} She loves food that has an exceptional amount of sugar, and likes to bake cakes.^{Ep. 3}} Her pit crew is composed of beautiful ladies.^{Ep. 7} She despises anything perverted and will punch or slap the boys whenever they act that way.^{Ep. 5, 6, 12} Like Asagi, she is also self-conscious and shy on stage.^{Ep. 12} As the series progresses, she begins to show romantic interest in Izuru.
Tamaki Irie (イリエ・タマキ, Irie Tamaki)
Voiced by: Yuka Iguchi (Japanese); Monica Rial (English)^{Ep. 1 credits}
Tamaki is the booster of Team Rabbits, piloting the heavily armored "Rose 3", a mecha designed to put enemy formations in disarray with its speed,^{Ep. 1} taking advantage of her ability to withstand high levels of acceleration due to her genetic enhancements.^{Ep. 3} She is the shortest of the team members and has red hair,^{Ep. 1} but is fairly busty.^{Ep. 12} She is boy-crazy and is often seen impulsively asking handsome men to be her boyfriend.^{Ep. 3, 4} Her pit crew, however, is composed of fat unattractive men that prefer 2D girls, much to her dismay.^{Ep. 7}
Ataru Suruga (スルガ・アタル, Suruga Ataru)
Voiced by: Junya Ikeda (Japanese); Tyler Galindo (English)^{Ep. 1 credits}
Ataru is the gunner of Team Rabbits, piloting the "Gold 4", specializing in sniping and long/mid-range support fire.^{Ep. 1} He has orange feathered hair and wears rectangular-framed glasses.^{Ep. 1} Thanks to his superior selective memory due to his genetic enhancements,^{Ep. 3} Ataru is a military geek who incessantly talks about military hardware and weaponry, even when trying to flirt with girls.^{Ep. 2, 3} He is assessed as one of the most versatile pilots among Team Rabbits, able to choose the best weapon loadout for a mission.^{Ep. 3} His pit crew is composed of muscle-headed men.^{Ep. 7}
Ange Kuroki (クロキ・アンジュ, Kuroki Anju)
Voiced by: Akeno Watanabe (Japanese); Kalin Coates (English)^{Ep. 5 credits}
Ange joins Team Rabbits halfway through the series piloting the "Black 6", focused in mid-range artillery and close quarters combat, that later serves as the base for the mass-production "Shrike" units. Ange has purple hair. Ange's gender is never revealed and the rest of the team has divided opinions about it. Despite being farther skilled and better trained than the rest, Ange is usually shy when speaking to others, but displays a vicious and berserk demeanor when in battle. Ange's mecha has an automated maintenance system that dispenses the need of a pit crew most of the time.^{Ep. 13}

=== Staff ===
The Military Junior Pre-Academy (MJP) and Global Defense Force (GDF) staff include the following characters:

Rin Suzukaze (スズカゼ・リン, Suzukaze Rin)
Voiced by: Miyuki Sawashiro (Japanese); Shelley Calene-Black (English)^{Ep. 1 credits}
Commander of Team Rabbits, she is doubtful at first of their capability to master the Juria System, until their feats in battle prove otherwise. She has blonde hair styled in a bob with a part that covers her right eye.^{Ep. 1} She is usually the most troubled by their antics,^{Ep. 1, 2} and is annoyed in an early episode when the press calls her a manager as if she were in charge of a group of idols.^{Ep. 2} She enjoys lollipops.^{Ep. 1} A former pilot, she retired to teaching at the MJP.^{Ep. 4} After Team Rabbits graduates, she joins them as a captain of the Godinion.^{Ep. 6}
Simon Gato (シモン・ガトゥ, Shimon Gatu)
Voiced by: Hiroki Tōchi (Japanese); Jay Hickman (English)^{Ep. 1 credits}
Head of the MJP project responsible for the development of the Juria System.^{Ep. 1} He wears grey visor glasses.^{Ep. 1} It was him who chose Team Rabbits to take part in the project, claiming that their outstanding survival instincts and individual abilities shall eventually led them to become a force to be reckoned with once they overcome their personal weaknesses and lack of teamwork. It is later revealed that his DNA was used to produce both Izuru and Asagi, making him their biological father.^{Ep. 20}
Reika Saionji (西園寺 レイカ, Saionji Reika)
Voiced by: Sayaka Ohara (Japanese); Molly Searcy (English)^{Ep. 1 credits}
The head mechanic of Team Rabbits. She is usually seen in a green mechanics jumpsuit where the top is exposed to show much of her well-endowed chest.^{Ep. 1} She often drinks, and is a childhood friend of "Rin-Rin" since elementary school, having reunited with her after joining the military.^{Ep. 4} In episode 4, it is revealed she is an heiress of Saionji Pharmaceutical, but chose the mechanic's life as her career.^{Ep. 4}
Siegfried von Vestannah (ジークフリート・フォン・ヴェスターナッハ, Jīkufurīto fon Vuesutanahha)
Voiced by: Hirofumi Nojima (Japanese); David Wald (English)^{Ep. 1 credits}
A communications officer on the Godinion's bridge along Giuliano. He has dark hair. His family has been serving in some form of military service since the Holy Roman Empire and is a descendant of Prussian junkers.^{Ep. 9}
Giuliano Visconti (ジュリアーノ・ヴィスコンティ, Juriāno Visconti)
Voiced by: Kosuke Toriumi (Japanese); John Gremillion (English)^{Ep. 1 credits}
A communications officer of the Godinion's along with Siegfried. He has yellow-orange hair.^{Ep. 9}
Teoria (テオーリア, Teōria)
Voiced by: Shizuka Ito (Japanese); Maggie Flecknoe (English)^{Ep. 2 credits}
A mysterious girl with white hair with pink hair clips. Izuru finds her familiar, but does not remember when.^{Ep. 7} She is actually a member of the Wulgaru royal family who defected to help the humans, giving them the Wulgaru technology to build the AHSMB. ^{Ep. 9} She has met Izuru before his memory was erased and has shown great concern towards Izuru. It is later revealed that she is the younger sister of Jiart and Galkie. She also gave the maternal DNA used to make Izuru making her his biological mother and making Izuru half-Wulgaru.^{Ep. 20}
When the location of the Gate the Wulguru were using to invade the solar system was located, at the cost of the lives of two members of Team Doberman, she revealed herself to the world's governments and volunteered to join in on the assault to destroy the gate and halt the invasion.^{Ep. 20}
Daneel (ダニール, Danīru)
Voiced by: Chihiro Suzuki (Japanese); Blake Shepard (English)^{Ep. 4 credits}
Teoria's aide who followed her after she defected from the Wulgaru.^{Ep. 9}
Hazuki Amane (アマネ・ハヅキ, Amane Hazuki)
Voiced by: Masumi Asano (Japanese); Luci Christian (English)^{Ep. 2 credits}
A lieutenant of the GDF whose prowess in leadership earns her a quick rising to captain and then admiral in the military ranks.^{Ep. 15} She has short brown hair.^{Ep. 2} She is friends with Rin and Reika.
Dai Komine (コミネ・ダイ, Komine Dai)
Voiced by: Toshiharu Nakanishi (Japanese); John Swasey (English)^{Ep. 4 credits}
A GDF Vice Chief of Staff, he orders Team Rabbits to attack a group of Wulgaru ships that were supposedly transporting cargo. When it was soon discovered that the ships were actually a reconnaissance squad, he orders Team Rabbits to attack them anyway. He does not like to lose and is highly motivated by money, calling the mecha that Team Rabbits uses his investment.^{Ep. 3-4} In the movie. Komine is reassigned to command Star Rose 2, that was being developed in secret.
Peko Yamada (山田 ペコ, Yamada Peko)
Voiced by: Nao Tōyama (Japanese); Tiffany Grant (English)^{Ep. 7 credits}
Personal assistant to Team Rabbits, she arranges different PR events for the group. She has black hair with straight bangs that cover her eyes, and wears a red robe-like jacket over a white shirt and dark pants.^{Ep. 7, 12}
Lula Chang (ルーラ・チャン, Rūra Chan)
Voiced by: Mai Toudou (Japanese); Luci Christian (English)^{ep. 14 credits}
A medical officer of the MJP and Godinion. She has red hair styled in a high ponytail. She gives Team Rabbits their physicals and reports on their physical and mental welfare.^{Ep. 3, 14}
Sugita (スギタ)
Voiced by: Tomokazu Sugita
Team Fawn's instructor from Granzere City Academy. Introduced in the 25th episode.^{Ep. 25}

=== Team Doberman ===
Team Doberman (チーム・ドーベルマン, Chīmu Dōberuman) is a group of MJP students who are seniors to Team Rabbits. Their existence was kept a secret from GDF until episode 4 when they rescued Team Rabbits from a Wulgaru squadron.^{Ep. 4} Their mecha are called Rhinos, which served as prototypes for the AHSMB.^{Ep. 5} In the movie, its sole surviving pilot joins with a new partner to form Team Fox (チーム・フォックス, Chīmu Fokkusu).

Randy Maxwell (ランディ・マクスウエル, Randi Makusuueru)
Voiced by: Anri Katsu (Japanese); Andrew Love (English))^{Ep. 5}
The red-haired leader of Team Doberman, he enjoys having a cool attitude and flirting with the ladies.^{Ep. 5} He quickly adopted the role of a mentor figure to Izuru, encouraging him to trust his teammates' abilities.^{Ep. 5} He likes watching adult videos; his favorite type of girls is the big sister bossy types.^{Ep. 5, 19}
Rakesh Chandrasekhar (ラケシュ・チャンドラセカール, Rakeshu Chandorasekāru)
Voiced by: Yuki Fujiwara (Japanese); Kyle Colby Jones (English)^{Ep. 5}
Sub-leader and the level-headed tsukkomi member of Team Doberman. He has black hair and is from the Indian subcontinent.^{Ep. 5} He has a fiancee by arranged marriage, and intends to marry her once the war is over.^{Ep. 19} He is the only member of the team who returns alive after a reconnaissance mission to locate the Wulgaru's warp gate.^{Ep. 19} In the movie, he is reassigned to Team Fox with Patricia.
Patrick Hoyle (パトリック・ホイル, Patorikku Hoiru)
Voiced by: Ayumu Murase (Japanese); Johnny DeLaCerda (English)^{Ep. 4}
Youngest member of Team Doberman. He has blond hair, and appears like an aristocrat from the United Kingdom.^{Ep. 5} He later develops a huge crush for Tamaki.^{Ep. 17-19}
Patricia Hoyle (パトリシア・ホイル, Patorishia Hoiru)
Voiced by: Yuko Sanpei
Patrick's twin sister, she joins Chandra as part of Team Fox in the movie.

=== Wulgaru ===
The Wulgaru (ウルガル, Urugaru), also known as the United Pan-Galactic Empire,^{Ep. 3} are an alien race that serves as the antagonists in the series. Although they don't have the numbers as the Earth forces, they are extremely fast and fierce.^{Ep. 4, 5} Concerned that their species is too weak to sustain themselves, they embarked on a project in which they sent out genetic material to planets all over the universe with the hopes that some of the material would be able to evolve and adapt to new conditions. They would then "harvest" the genetic material as lamata (prey), with hopes that it would improve their own genes.^{Ep. 7-10} The main characters among the Wulgaru include the ruling nobility as well as the Legatus (レガトゥス, Regato-usu) or military commanders.^{Ep. 18}

Jiart (ジアート, Jiāto)
Voiced by: Hikaru Midorikawa (Japanese); David Matranga (English)^{Ep. 2}
Plegazus (second son) Jiart is the Prince of the Wulgaru and brother of the king and Teoria, His squad's mecha are black with a bluish outline glow, and his own mecha is white.^{Ep. 7} he has little care for the objectives and needs of his people and focuses himself on satisfy his desires, as he intends to only fight enemies that can quench his thirst for thrilling battles.^{Ep. 7} Not impressed when confronting Team Rabbits at first, he lets them live claiming they are not even worthy to be killed by him. However, he finds in Izuru a worthy opponent during their second clash, to the point of sparing his life once more hoping to fight him again^{Ep. 8} on a later occasion and becomes more obsessed with him each time they meet in battle. He doesn't get along well with his Wulgaru companions only listening to his brother's word. During the fight to defend the Warp gate from the Earth forces, Jiart finally satisfies his wish of having a bout to the death with Izuru, which ends with him killed.^{Ep. 24}
Galkie (ガルキエ, Garukie; also Garukie)
Voiced by: Kiyoyuki Yanada (Japanese); Marty Fleck (English)^{Ep. 7 credits}
The current emperor of Wulgaru,^{Ep. 7} being crowned the Emperor after the assassination of his father, the former emperor. He is the older brother of Jiart and Teoria. He has a good relationship with Jiart, and is tolerant of his uninterested behaviour. After the Earth forces defeat the Wulgaru garrison protecting one of there Warp gates and destroy it, Garukie does not show any contempt, but rejoices instead, claiming that humankind may be the species that will finally open a new evolutionary path to them based on dead human bodies for genetic material and human information and data recover from them and there technology.^{Ep. 24}
Dolgana (ドルガナ, Dorugana)
Voiced by: Masanori Machida (Japanese); George Manley (English)^{Ep. 7 credits}
A commander with a purple beard and scars across his face in a green and brown outfit. He is a strategist that specializes in heavy weapons and large forces. His mecha squad colors are a glowing red and black.^{Ep. 7}
Klein (クレイン, Kurein)
Voiced by: Kazutomi Yamamoto (Japanese); Greg Ayres (English)^{Ep. 7 credits}
A commander with spiky blond hair and a green cloak. He has a child-like appearance and is short tempered. He is brutal and merciless, and relies on speed tactics. His mecha squad colors are a glowing purple and black theme.^{Ep. 7} He leads an attack on the Team Rabbits' school on Earth, but he and his squad are ultimately destroyed by the Earth's special beam cannon.^{Ep. 18}
Rada (ラダ)
Voiced by: Chihiro Suzuki (Japanese); Patrick Poole (English)^{Ep. 1 credits}
A commander with a light blue buzzcut hair and a headband that consists of two strings crossed over. He wears a large pink and yellow jacket atop a white uniform. He usually operates in the vanguard of the attacks against Earth. He has a hysterical, merciless, and sadistic personality. His mecha squad colors are a glowing green and black. ^{Ep. 7} When he overhears Jiart and Lumes discussing contacting Teoria, he tries to escape. He is ultimately cut down by Jiart, who he and Lumes had reported Rada in for treason.^{Ep. 18}
Lumes (ルメス, Rumesu)
Voiced by: Junichi Suwabe (Japanese); Ricardo Contreras (English)^{Ep. 7 credits}
A commander with blond hair and a blue uniform with a white vertical stripe. He has a calm demeanor. His mecha squad colors are orange and blue.^{Ep. 7}
Lutiel (ルティエル, Rutieru)
Voiced by: Yukana (Japanese); Emily Neves (English)^{Ep. 7 credits}
A busty female commander with light purple hair and a red and white outfit that looks like a sling swimsuit and white feathers at her shoulders and thighs. Her mecha squad colors are glowing yellow and black. She tries to seduce Jiart and the others.^{Ep. 7} She and her fleet managed to kill Randy and Patrick while Team Doberman was doing a recon mission.^{Ep. 19} Later on, she was killed by Team Rabbits sans Izuru when the GDF went on their mission to close the Wulgaru gate at the edge of the solar system.^{Ep. 22}
Diorna (ディオルナ, Dioruna)
Voiced by: Misaki Kuno
The main villain of the movie. Created by infusing the DNA of Jiart and Teoria, Diorna is a child developed in laboratory at the Wulgaru's warp gate. After the gate's destruction in operation Heaven's Gate, Diorna assumes command of the remaining Wulgaru troops in the system and launches an attack on Earth. Like Teoria and Jiart's, Diorna's mecha is colored white, as a symbol of her royal heritage. While trying to breach into Granzere City Academy's shelter to attack the students, Diorna is intercepted by Team Rabbits and killed when all its members, in a combined effort, corner and restrain her mecha time enough to fire a fatal shot at her.

=== Team Fawn ===
Team Fawn (チーム・フォーン, Chīmu fōn) is a new group of MJP students from Granzere City Academy (グランツェーレ都市学園, Gurantsu~ēre toshi gakuen) introduced in the bonus episode 25 and are featured in the film.

Ahn Medikum (アン・メディクム, An Medikumu)
Voiced by: Aina Suzuki
Ahn is the vanguard of Team Fawn, piloting the attack-oriented "Orange 7". She is a bit of an airhead.^{Ep. 25}
Yui Magalanes (ユイ・マガリャネス, Yui Magaryanesu)
Voiced by: Sora Amamiya
Yui is the gunner of Team Fawn, piloting the sniping/artillery-oriented "Silver 8". A beautiful girl who has a cool attitude.^{Ep. 25}
Sei Yuzuriha (セイ・ユズリハ, Sei Yuzuriha)
Voiced by: Sōma Saitō
Sei is the control of Team Fawn, piloting the sensor-oriented "Green 9" who likes to talk a lot and his meals are composed of highly spiced foods.^{Ep. 25}
Chris Solfelino (クリス・ソルフェリーノ, Kurisu Soruferīno)
Voiced by: Tsubasa Yonaga
Chris is the booster of Team Fawn, piloting the speed-oriented "Magenta 10" who loves to race and idolizes Tamaki.^{Ep. 25}

== Works cited ==
- "Ch." is shortened form for chapter and refers to a chapter number of the Majestic Prince manga
- "Ep." is shortened form for episode and refers to an episode number of the Majestic Prince anime. English version by Sentai Filmworks. The listings for Japanese Vocal Cast and English Vocal Cast in the closing credits.
