= Daniel Cosgrove =

American actor

- Born: Daniel Thomas Cosgrove; December 16, 1970 (age 55); New Haven, Connecticut, U.S.
- Occupation: Actor
- Years active: 1996–present
- Spouse: Marie Cosgrove (m. 1997)
- Children: 4

Daniel Thomas Cosgrove (born December 16, 1970) is an American actor. He is known for his roles as Scott Chandler on All My Children, Matt Durning on Beverly Hills, 90210, Bill Lewis on Guiding Light, Christopher Hughes II on As the World Turns and Aiden Jennings on Days of Our Lives.

Cosgrove has been a cast member during the series finale of three consecutive cancelled soap operas: Guiding Light, As the World Turns, and All My Children.

Cosgrove joined General Hospital in March 2025, playing the role of Ezra Boyle.

== Personal life ==
Daniel Cosgrove was born in New Haven, Connecticut and grew up in Branford, Connecticut. He graduated from Notre Dame High School in 1989.

Cosgrove is married to Marie Cosgrove. The couple have four children.

== Career ==
In 1996, Cosgrove joined the cast of the ABC soap opera All My Children in the role of Scott Chandler. He left the show in the fall of 1998 to explore other opportunities. That same year, Cosgrove moved to Los Angeles to take the role of Matt Durning on Beverly Hills, 90210, where he remained until the show ended in 2000.

He played Richard "Dick" Bagg in the 2002 comedy film Van Wilder. In June 2002, he moved back to New York to join the cast of Guiding Light as Bill Lewis III, leaving the show in October 2005 after opting not to renew his contract. He later returned to the role in October 2007 and was nominated for his first Daytime Emmy for Outstanding Supporting Actor in a Drama Series in 2008. He remained on Guiding Light until the show left the air on Sept. 18, 2009.

Cosgrove moved back to California for his role as Jon Lemonick in the series, In Justice, which premiered on ABC in January 2006. In September 2007, he portrayed Freddy Mason on the ABC drama Dirty Sexy Money.

In March 2010, he began playing the role of Chris Hughes on As the World Turns until the show ended in September 2010.

Cosgrove returned to All My Children as Scott Chandler from December 2010 until the show's finale episode in September 2011. In January 2014, he joined the cast of Days of Our Lives as Aiden Jennings.

Cosgrove has been a cast member during the series finale of three consecutive cancelled soap operas: Guiding Light, As the World Turns, and All My Children.

In 2018, Cosgrove starred as Ron in the first season of the Lifetime thriller series You.

== Filmography ==
Year	Title	Role	Notes
1996–1998 & 2010–2011	All My Children	Scott Chandler #3	Main role
1998–2000	Beverly Hills, 90210	Matt Durning	Main role
1998	The Object of My Affection	Trotter Bull	
1999	Lucid Days in Hell	Dean	
2000	Satan's School for Girls	Mark Lantch	
2000	Artie	Frank Wilson	
2001	Valentine	Campbell Morris	
2001	All Souls	Dr. Brad Sterling	5 episodes
2001	The Way She Moves	Jason	
2001	They Crawl	Ted Gage	
2002	Van Wilder	Richard Bagg	
2002–2005; & 2007–2009	Guiding Light	Bill Lewis III	Main role
2006	In Justice	Jon Lemonick	Recurring role
2007	Dirty Sexy Money	Freddy Mason	Recurring role
2007	Mattie Fresno and the Holoflux Universe	David	
2009	The Forgotten	John Lucas	1 episode
2010	The Good Wife	Detective Bryan Murphy	1 episode
2010	As the World Turns	Christopher Hughes II	Main role
2011	Steamboat	Larry Trout	
2011	Jeremy Fink and the Meaning of Life	Herb Muldoun	
2012	Unforgettable	Chad Martin	Episode: "Brotherhood"
2013	Person of Interest	Jeremy Watkins	Episode: "Reasonable Doubt"
2014–2016	Days of Our Lives	Aiden Jennings	Main role
2016	Elementary	Len	Episode: "Henny Penny the Sky Is Falling"
2017	Law & Order: Special Victims Unit	Dr. Daniel Keller	Episode: "Motherly Love"
2018	You	Ron	7 episodes
2019	The Blacklist	Digby Tamerlane	Episode: "The Ethicist (No. 91)"
2019-2020	Almost Family	Chad	6 episodes
2020	Sticky	Lyle	Short
2021	Blue Bloods	Det. Felix Evans	2 episodes
2021	Bull	AUSA Carto	Episode: "Espionage"
2016–2021	Billions	Dan Margolis/Danny Margolis	7 episodes
2023	And Just Like That...	Edward	Episode: "Trick or Treat"
