= Annika Boras =

American actress

- Born: Annika Ley Boras; February 28, 1981 (age 45); Teaneck, New Jersey, U.S.
- Education: Royal Academy of Dramatic Art
- Occupation: Actress

Annika Boras (born February 28, 1981) is an American actress and director. As a theater actress, she received a Drama League Award nomination for her portrayal of Elektra in An Oresteia as well as a Lucille Lortel Award nomination for her performance in Edward Bond's Chair. In 2017, she appeared in the film A Kid Like Jake. She also appeared as Mrs. Alsop in The Post.

== Early life and education ==
Boras was born in New Jersey, to Erika (Nelson) Boras (now Erika Tesi), a classical cellist and music educator, and Dr. Tom Boras, a jazz saxophonist, composer and the director of jazz studies at NYU. She was raised in Bergen County, New Jersey and Greenwich Village. Boras has one sister, Brit Boras. She began studies to receive a Bachelor of Music at New York University. After a year, she left NYU to study acting in London. Boras graduated from the Royal Academy of Dramatic Art.

== Filmography ==
=== Film ===
Year	Title	Role	Notes
2009	Exit 19	Detective Steigerwald	TV film
2017	The Post	Mrs. Alsop	
2018	A Kid Like Jake	Lynn	

=== Television ===
Year	Title	Role	Notes
2006	Northern Lights	Becky	1 episode
2007	Law & Order	Trina Bailey	Episode: "The Family Hour"
2008	CSI: NY	Paramedic	Episode: "Veritas"
2008	Ugly Betty	Anna Diaz	Episode: "Betty Suarez Land"
2008	Law & Order: Special Victims Unit	Leslie Schuster	Episode: "Lunacy"
2010	Rescue Me	Alice	Episode: "Blackout"
2011	Lights Out	Charlie Baye	3 episodes
2011	Blue Bloods	Lacy Campisi	Episode: "Critical Condition"
2011	The Good Wife	Nina Dolan	Episode: "Feeding the Rat"
2011	Homeland	Jessica's Friend	Episode: "Semper I"
2012	NYC 22	Amber	Episode: "Lost and Found"
2012	Royal Pains	KJ Golan	2 episodes
2012	Elementary	Amy Damper	Episode: "Pilot"
2012	Made in Jersey	Penelope Banforth	Episode: "Camelot"
2013	Law & Order: Special Victims Unit	Melissa Murphy	Episode: "Criminal Hatred"
2013	The Following	Louise Sinclair	3 episodes
2013	Person of Interest	Nicole Spencer	Episode: "Reasonable Doubt"
2013	Unforgettable	Jacqueline Mikhailova	2 episodes
2014	The Blacklist	Kaja Tomczak	Episode: "Monarch Douglas Bank (No. 112)"
2015	Chicago Fire	Captain Lynette Cunningham	3 episodes
2016	The Get Down	Mrs. Gunns	Episode: "Raise Your Words, Not Your Voice"
2017	Time After Time	Phyllis Holland	2 episodes
2018	Succession	Anna Newman	Episode: "Sad Sack Wasp Trap"
2018	Random Acts of Flyness	White Reporter	Episode: "I tried to tell my therapist about my dreams/MARTIN HAD A DREEEEAAAAM"
2019	NCIS: New Orleans	Michelle Gardner	Episode: "Desperate Navy Wives"
2022	Bull	Kyla Moore	Episode: "Opening Up"
2022	FBI	Liza Peters	Episode: "Double Bind"

=== Theater ===
Year	Title	Role	Notes
2005	Carver	Waitress	Arcola Theatre, London, United Kingdom
2006	Romeo & Juliet	Juliet	ART, Boston
2007	The Error of Their Ways	Helena	HERE Arts, New York City
2008	The Miracle Worker	Annie Sullivan	Paper Mill Playhouse, New Jersey
2008	Chair	The Welfare Officer	Theatre for a New Audience, Duke Theatre, New York City
2009	The Importance of Being Earnest	Gwendolyn	Paper Mill Playhouse, New Jersey
2009	An Oresteia	Electra	Classic Stage Company, New York City
2009	Ernest in Love	Gwendoline	Irish Repertory Theatre, New York City
2010	Orlando	Sasha	Classic Stage Company, New York City
2011	Macbeth	Lady Macbeth	Theatre for a New Audience, Duke Theatre, New York City
2012	The Broken Heart	Penthea	Theatre for a New Audience, Duke Theatre, New York City
2014	The Danish Widow	Aline	New York Stage and Film, Poughkeepsie, New York
2016	Prodigal Son	Louise	Manhattan Theatre Club, New York City
2016	Junk	Amy Merkin	La Jolla Playhouse, California
2017	Man from Nebraska	Ashley	2nd Stage Theatre, New York City

== Awards and nominations ==
Year	Award	Category	Nominated work	Result
2009	Lucille Lortel Award	Outstanding Featured Actress in a Play	Chair	Nominated
2009	Drama League Award	Distinguished Performance in a Play	An Oresteia	Nominated

== Personal life ==
Boras is the maternal granddaughter of The Public Theater actor Herbert Nelson and actress/director Joan Deweese. As of September 2020, she is engaged to playwright Ayad Akhtar.
