= Stanya Kahn =

American video artist (born 1968)

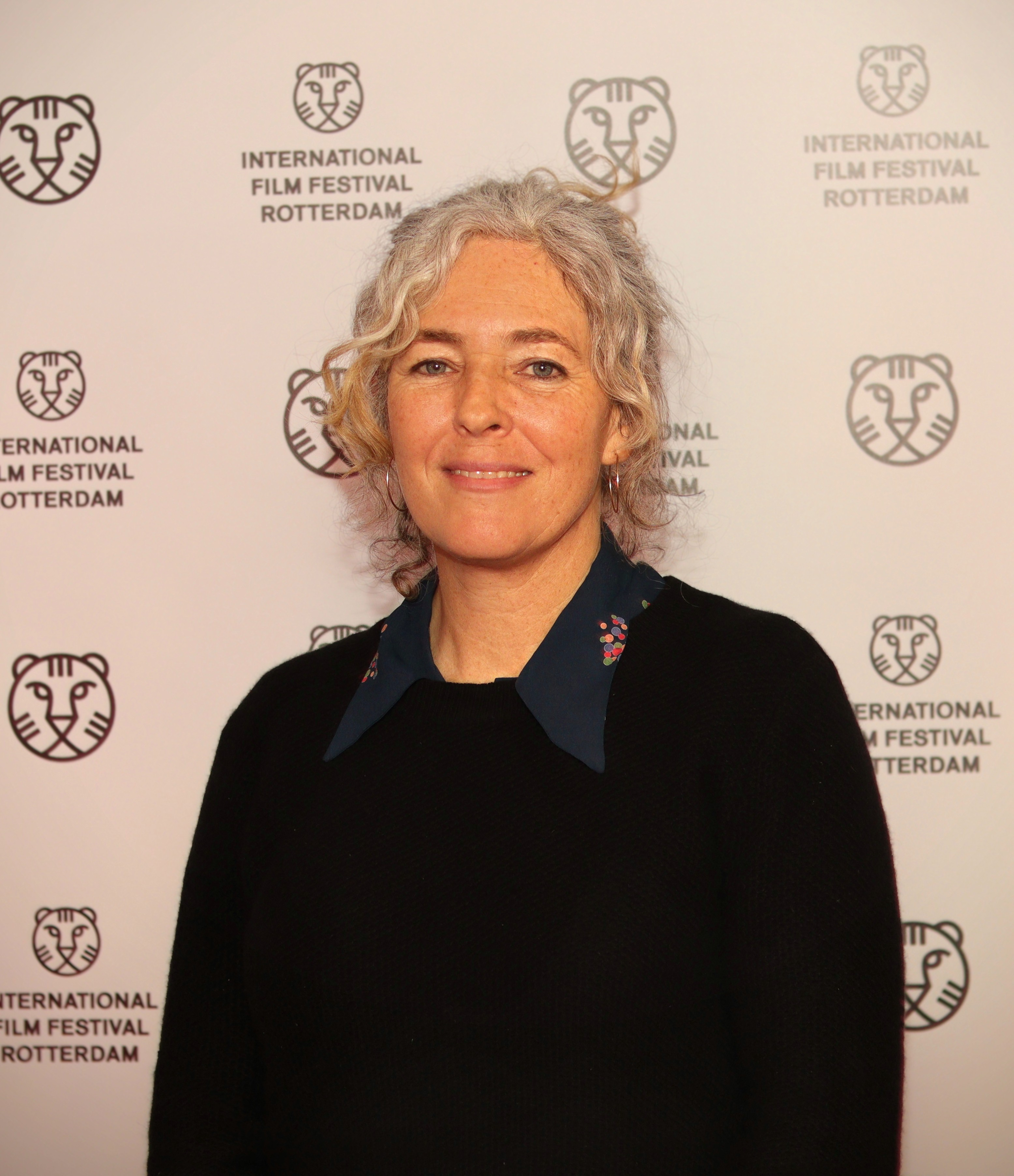
- Kahn at the IFFR 2023
- Born: 1968 (age 57–58); San Francisco, California, U.S.
- Education: San Francisco State University Milton Avery Graduate School of the Arts at Bard College
- Website: StanyaKahn.com

Stanya Kahn (born 1968) is an American artist. She graduated magna cum laude from San Francisco State University and received an MFA in 2003 from the Milton Avery Graduate School of the Arts at Bard College. Kahn lives and works in Los Angeles, California.

== Artwork ==
Kahn was a 2012 Guggenheim Fellow in Film/Video. She was a contributing writer and actor in the feature film By Hook or By Crook.

=== Films and videos ===
Kahn has made two feature films and multiple shorts and animations, including:

- 2020 No Go Backs (33 min short, 16mm transferred to 2K)
- 2011–2017 Stand in the Stream (60 min feature, HD video)
- 2014 Don't Go Back to Sleep (74 min feature, HD video)
- 2012 Happy Song for You (5 min short, HD video)
- 2010 It's Cool, I'm Good (35 min short, SD video)

=== Early work ===
From 1988 to 1999 Kahn made multidisciplinary performance works, both solo and collaborative, in San Francisco, New York, and touring nationally and internationally.

=== Collaborations with Harry Dodge ===
In the early 1990s, Kahn met Harry Dodge, a video artist. The two began collaborating in the late 1990s on performance and on the film By Hook or By Crook and continued making short videos until 2008, co-writing, directing and editing. Kahn improvised most of the language in the videos while Dodge often operated the camera.

Their comedic videos satirize the awkwardness of artmaking, video, and gender and touch upon the darker seriousness of trauma, privilege, and politics. Among several other museums and events, Kahn and Dodge's work has been shown in numerous venues nationally and internationally, including:

- The 2008 Whitney Biennial
- The 2010 California Biennial at the Orange County Museum of Art
- Getty Center, Los Angeles
- Hammer Museum, Los Angeles
- The Museum of Contemporary Art, Los Angeles
- The Museum of Modern Art, New York
- Sundance Film Festival, Utah

== Achievements ==
- 2012 – John Simon Guggenheim Memorial Foundation Fellowship
- 2012 – Jury Prize: Best Short, Narrative Fiction, Migrating Forms Film Festival
- 2013 – Artadia Award, Los Angeles
- 2014 CCI Investing in Artists Grant
- 2015 – San Francisco Art Institute Artist-in-Residence
- 2017 Acts of Life Residency, Singapore and Manila, NTU CCA & Goethe Institute
- 2017 Herb Alpert Award nomination (two categories: visual art and film/video)
- 2018 Herb Alpert Award nomination (film/video)
- 2018 MacDowell Residency
- 2020 Anonymous Was a Woman nomination
- 2020 Herb Alpert nomination (film/video)
- 2023 Anonymous Was a Woman Award
