= Yuka Iguchi =

Japanese voice actress (born 1988)

- 井口 裕香
- Born: July 11, 1988 (age 38); Tokyo, Japan
- Occupations: Voice actress; singer
- Years active: 2002–present
- Agent: Office Osawa
- Height: 157 cm (5 ft 2 in)
- Musical career
- Genre: J-pop
- Instrument: Vocals
- Years active: 2013–present
- Labels: Warner Bros. Home Entertainment (2013–2020); Kadokawa (2022–present)
- Website: https://iguchiyuka.jp/

Yuka Iguchi (井口 裕香, Iguchi Yuka; born July 11, 1988) is a Japanese voice actress and singer.

== Biography ==
She worked at Broccoli. Her song "Shining Star Love Letter" was used for A Certain Magical Index: The Movie – The Miracle of Endymion.

== Filmography ==
=== Anime ===
Year	Title	Role
2003	Di Gi Charat Nyo!	Akari Usada
2005	Canvas 2: Akane-iro no Palette	Kawana Takato
2006	Ghost Hunt	Kiyomi Itō
2006	Tokimeki Memorial Only Love	Sakura Shinjō
2007	Bakugan Battle Brawlers	Oberus
2007	Bokurano	Mako Nakarai
2007	Idolmaster: Xenoglossia	Haruka Amami
2007	Kenkō Zenrakei Suieibu Umishō	Chigusa Yasu
2007	Indian Summer	Ayumi Hagiwara
2008	A Certain Magical Index	Index
2008	Kamen no Maid Guy	Naeka Fujiwara
2008	The Garden of Sinners	Shizune Seo
2008	My-Otome 0: S.ifr	M-9
2008	True Tears	Aiko Andō
2008	The Familiar of Zero	Illococoo
2009	A Certain Scientific Railgun	Index
2009	Bakemonogatari	Tsukihi Araragi
2009	Fairy Tail	Sherry Blendy / Sherria Blendy
2009	Nyan Koi!	Kaede Mizuno
2009	Samurai Harem: Asu no Yoichi	Kano / Masayuki / Ukyo Saginomiya (young)
2009	Shakugan no Shana S	Index
2009	Shangri-La	Karin Ishida
2010	A Certain Magical Index II	Index
2010	Lilpri	Karen
2010	Demon King Daimao	Yūko Hattori / Yuri Hoshino
2010	Jewelpet	Tametorin /Toristein / Monica Sakura
2010	Mayoi Neko Overrun!	Chise Umenomori
2010	Otome Yōkai Zakuro	Sakura
2010	Sekirei: Pure Engagement	Oriha
2010	Tamayura	Norie Okazaki
2010	Yumeiro Patissiere SP Professional	Linda Parker
2011	Haganai	Maria Takayama
2011	C³	Sovereignty
2011	Chibi Devi!	Honoka Sawada
2011	Ground Control to Psychoelectric Girl	Yashiro Hoshimiya
2011	Fractale	Enri Granitz
2011	Mayo Chiki!	Konoe Subaru
2011	Mitsudomoe	Shiori Ito
2011	Ro-Kyu-Bu!	Maho Misawa
2011	Tamayura	Norie Okazaki
2012	A Channel	Keiko
2012	Waiting in the Summer	Chiharu Arisawa
2012	Arata-naru Sekai	Hoshigaoka
2012	Girls und Panzer	Mako Reizei
2012	Hayate the Combat Butler: Can't Take My Eyes Off You	Ruri Tsugumi
2012	Nekomonogatari (Black)	Tsukihi Araragi
2012	Nisemonogatari	Tsukihi Araragi
2012	Sankarea: Undying Love	Mero Furuya
2012	Symphogear	Miku Kohinata
2012	To Love Ru Darkness	Mea Kurosaki
2012	Touhou Musou Kakyou: A Summer Day's Dream 2	Tewi Inaba
2012	The Familiar of Zero: F	Illococoo
2013	A Certain Magical Index: The Movie – The Miracle of Endymion	Index
2013	Boku no Imōto wa "Ōsaka Okan"	Kaede
2013	Haganai NEXT	Maria Takayama
2013	Devil Survivor 2: The Animation	Otome Yanagiya
2013	Monogatari Series Second Season	Tsukihi Araragi
2013	Ro-Kyu-Bu! SS	Maho Misawa
2013	Senran Kagura	Hibari
2013	Strike the Blood	Astarte
2013	Tamayura: More Aggressive	Norie Okazaki
2013	The World God Only Knows: Goddesses Arc	Tsukiyo Kujō / Vulcan
2013	Encouragement of Climb	Aoi Yukimura
2013	Senki Zesshō Symphogear G	Miku Kohinata
2013	Majestic Prince	Tamaki Irie
2013	Dog & Scissors	Yuki Sumiya
2014	Battle Spirits: Saikyou Ginga Ultimate Zero	Mugen
2014	Sakura Trick	Yū Sonoda
2014	Lady Jewelpet	Luea
2014	No Game No Life	Chlammy Zell
2014	Nobunaga the Fool	Doree
2014	The Comic Artist and His Assistants	Rinna Fuwa
2014	Encouragement of Climb: Second Season	Aoi Yukimura
2014	Lord Marksman and Vanadis	Limlisha
2015	Girls und Panzer der Film	Mako Reizei
2015	Gourmet Girl Graffiti	Yuki Uchiki
2015	Is It Wrong to Try to Pick Up Girls in a Dungeon?	Chigusa Hitachi
2015	Kantai Collection	Kaga, Tone Sister
2015	Jewelpet: Magical Change	Luea
2015	Seraph of the End	Mitsuba Sangu
2015	To Love Ru Darkness 2nd	Mea Kurosaki
2015	Senki Zesshō Symphogear GX	Miku Kohinata
2015	Valkyrie Drive: Mermaid	Mirei Shikishima
2015	Chivalry of a Failed Knight	Nene Saikyō
2016	Phantasy Star Online 2: The Animation	Tia
2016	Flying Witch	Anzu Shiina
2016	Regalia: The Three Sacred Stars	Naru Arisaka
2016	Lostorage incited WIXOSS	Chinatsu Morikawa
2016	Keijo	Nami Nanase
2016	Re:Zero	Crusch Karsten
2017	Eromanga Sensei	Sagiri's Mother
2017	Angel's 3Piece!	Yuzuha Aigae
2017	Aho-Girl: Clueless Girl	Kuroko Shīna
2017	Symphogear AXZ	Miku Kohinata
2017	Kakegurui	Nanami Tsubomi
2017	Girls und Panzer das Finale: Part 1	Mako Reizei
2018	A Certain Magical Index III	Index
2018	A Place Further than the Universe	Hinata Miyake
2018	Encouragement of Climb: Third Season	Aoi Yukimura
2018	Goblin Slayer	Cow Girl
2018	Lostorage conflated WIXOSS	Chinatsu Morikawa
2019	Ascendance of a Bookworm	Myne/ Urano Motosu
2019	Fairy Gone	Patricia Pearl
2019	Fruits Basket	Mine Kuramae
2019	How Clumsy you are, Miss Ueno	Unogawa
2019	Is It Wrong to Try to Pick Up Girls in a Dungeon? II	Hitachi Chigusa
2019	Boruto	Sasami
2019	Kemono Friends 2	Domestic Dog
2019	Phantasy Star Online 2: Episode Oracle	Tia
2019	Symphogear XV	Miku Kohinata
2019	Girls und Panzer das Finale: Part 2	Mako Reizei
2020	Ascendance of a Bookworm Season 2	Myne/ Urano Motosu
2020	Food Wars! Shokugeki no Soma: The Fifth Plate	Lanterby
2020	Goblin Slayer: Goblin's Crown	Cow Girl
2020	Is It Wrong to Try to Pick Up Girls in a Dungeon? III	Hitachi Chigusa
2021	Mushoku Tensei: Jobless Reincarnation	Kishirika Kishirisu
2021	Tawawa on Monday 2	Little Sister
2021	That Time I Got Reincarnated as a Slime Season 2	Velzard
2021	Girls und Panzer das Finale: Part 3	Mako Reizei
2022	Ascendance of a Bookworm Season 3	Myne/ Urano Motosu
2022	Chiikawa	Momonga
2022	Delicious Party Pretty Cure	Ran Hanamichi / Cure Yumyum
2022	Encouragement of Climb: Next Summit	Aoi Yukimura
2023	I Got a Cheat Skill in Another World and Became Unrivaled in the Real World, Too	Akatsuki
2023	Girls und Panzer das Finale: Part 4	Mako Reizei
2023	Goblin Slayer II	Cow Girl
2024	The Dangers in My Heart Season 2	Kanna Andō
2024	Chillin' in Another World with Level 2 Super Cheat Powers	Sabea
2024	Plus-Sized Elf	Satero
2025	Hero Without a Class: Who Even Needs Skills?!	Mila
2025	Ninja vs. Gokudo	Tome Odaka
2026	Girls und Panzer: Motto Love Love Sakusen Desu!	Mako Reizei
2026	Ascendance of a Bookworm Season 4	Myne/ Urano Motosu
2026	Chiikawa the Movie: The Secret of the Mermaid Island	Momonga
2026	Horror Collector	Rima
2027	Wound & Bandage	Magical Penpengusa
2027	I Lost My Adventurer's License, but It's Fine Because I Have an Adorable Daughter Now	Rabi

=== Video games ===
Year	Title	Role
2004	Crash Twinsanity	Nitros Oxide
2005	Cross World - The World of Etatia	Tsukika
2007	Elsword	Lu
2009	Tokimeki Memorial 4	Fumiko Yanagi
2009	Muramasa: The Demon Blade	Sayo
2010	Atelier Totori: The Adventurer of Arland	Mimi Houllier Von Schwarzlang
2011	Senran Kagura Burst	Hibari
2011	Atelier Meruru: The Apprentice of Arland	Mimi Houllier Von Schwarzlang
2011	A Certain Magical Index	Index
2012	Phantasy Star Online 2	Tea
2013	Chain Chronicle	Orca / Bonito / Connely
2013	Counter-Strike Online 2	Yuri
2013	Kantai Collection	Chikuma / Tone / Isuzu / Natori / Kaga / Tenryuu / Tatsuta
2013	Senran Kagura Shinovi Versus	Hibari
2014	Etrian Odyssey 2 Untold: The Fafnir Knight	Chloe
2014	Granblue Fantasy	Lily
2014	Senran Kagura 2 Deep Crimson	Hibari
2015	Atelier Sophie: The Alchemist of the Mysterious Book	Plachta
2015	Senran Kagura Estival Versus	Hibari
2015	JoJo's Bizarre Adventure: Eyes of Heaven	Tsurugi Higashikata
2015	Busou Shinki	Lirbiete
2016	Valkyrie Drive: Bhikkhuni	Mirei Shikishima
2016	Gundam Breaker 3	Misa
2016	Atelier Firis: The Alchemist and the Mysterious Journey	Plachta
2017	Warriors All-Stars	Plachta
2017	Atelier Lydie & Suelle: The Alchemists and the Mysterious Paintings	Plachta
2017	Magia Record	Kirika Kure
2017	Kirara Fantasia	Sugar
2018	Mega Man 11	Roll
2018	Azur Lane	Kawakaze
2018	Crystar	Kokoro Fudōji
2018	Dragalia Lost	Lily
2018	Princess Connect! Re:Dive	Neneka
2019	Atelier Lulua: The Scion of Arland	Mimi Houllier Von Schwarzlang
2019	Arknights	Hibiscus / Saria
2020	Fate/Grand Order	Foreigner / Voyager
2020	Another Eden	Yukino
2021	Rune Factory 5	Lucy
2021	Blue Archive	Momoka Yuragi
2022	Atelier Sophie 2: The Alchemist of the Mysterious Dream	Plachta
2022	Return to Shironagasu Island	Neneko Izumozak
2022	Azur Lane	Kaga (Note: Iguchi replaced Ai Kayano for this role since 2022, after the latter's voice lines were removed from the Chinese servers of Azur Lane following her backlash as a result of her controversial Yasukuni Shrine visit in 2021.)
2022	Goddess of Victory: Nikke	Liter
2023	Girls' Frontline	QBZ-191 TF-Q
2024	Zenless Zone Zero	Koleda Belobog
2025	Magical Girl Witch Trials	Jougasaki Noah

=== Drama CD ===
- Shikisai-Train - Yuri Kaminuma, Megumi Kiryu, Kanade Sekina

== Discography ==
=== Singles ===
Release dates	Title	Peak Oricon chart position	Album
February 6, 2013	Shining Star-☆-LOVE Letter	#11	Hafa Adai
May 15, 2013	Grow Slowly	#10	Hafa Adai
November 27, 2013	rainbow heart♡ rainbow dream☆／Strike my soul	#25	Hafa Adai
April 29, 2015	Hey World	#20	az you like...
November 25, 2015	Little Charm Fang (リトルチャームファング)	#27	az you like...
January 14, 2016	Platinum Disco (白金ディスコ)	#18	az you like...
February 17, 2016	Kawaranai Tsuyosa (変わらない強さ)	#18	clearly
October 26, 2016	Lostorage	#35	clearly
May 24, 2017	Re-illusion	#19	clearly
July 17, 2019	Hello to Dream	#24	clearly
August 3, 2022	Ichibanboshi Sonority (一番星ソノリティ)	#41	Non-album singles
November 2, 2022	Prologue	—	Non-album singles

=== Albums ===
==== Studio albums ====
Year	Album details	Catalog No.	Peak Oricon chart positions
2014	Hafa Adai: Released: July 7, 2014; Label: Warner Home Video; Format: CD	1000497361 (Limited Edition); 1000497362 (Regular Edition)	14
2016	az you like...: Released: July 9, 2016; Label: Warner Home Video; Format: CD	1000601594 (Limited Edition) 1000601595 (Regular Edition)	17
2020	clearly: Released: August 12, 2020; Label: Warner Home Video; Format: CD	1000769388 (Limited Edition) 1000769389 (Regular Edition)	11

==== Mini albums ====
Year	Album details	Catalog No.	Peak Oricon chart positions
2017	Love: Released: November 15, 2017; Label: Warner Home Video; Format: CD	1000694661 (Limited Edition); 1000694662 (Regular Edition)	21
2023	Kimiga Kimide Kiminandayo: Released: July 12, 2023; Label: Kadokawa; Format: CD, Streaming, Download	ZMCZ-16731 (Regular Edition)	—
