= Reasonable Doubt (Person of Interest) =

- Person of Interest episode
- Episode no.: Season 3 Episode 4
- Directed by: Stephen Williams
- Written by: Melissa Scrivner Love
- Cinematography by: David Insley
- Editing by: Ray Daniels
- Production code: 2J7604
- Original air date: October 15, 2013
- Running time: 44 minutes

Guest appearances
- Kathleen Rose Perkins as Vanessa Watkins; Paul Ben-Victor as Detective Gary Cameron; Annika Boras as Nicole Spencer; Al Sapienza as Detective Raymond Terney; Brian Wiles as Officer Mike Laskey; Daniel Cosgrove as Jeremy Watkins; Treach as Reginald Marshall; Jennifer Ikeda as Dr. Rachel Jensen

Episode chronology
| ← Previous "Lady Killer" | Next → "Razgovor" |

"'Reasonable Doubt" is the 4th episode of the third season of the American television drama series Person of Interest. It is the 49th overall episode of the series and is written by producer Melissa Scrivner Love and directed by Stephen Williams. It aired on CBS in the United States and on CTV in Canada on October 15, 2013.

The series revolves around a computer program for the federal government known as "the Machine" that is capable of collating all sources of information to predict terrorist acts and to identify people planning them. A team, consisting of John Reese, Harold Finch and Sameen Shaw follow "irrelevant" crimes: lesser level of priority for the government. In the episode, the team follows a woman who has been accused of killing her husband. While the woman flees and maintains her innocence, the team is still unsure of what she is capable of doing and whether she actually did.. The title refers to "Reasonable doubt", a legal standard of proof required to validate a criminal conviction in most adversarial legal systems. Despite being credited, Amy Acker does not appear in the episode.

According to Nielsen Media Research, the episode was seen by an estimated 12.69 million household viewers and gained a 2.2/6 ratings share among adults aged 18–49. Critical reception was generally positive, although some critics expressed dissatisfaction for not following on the ending of the previous episode.

== Plot ==
After saving a veterinarian from hitmen, Reese (Jim Caviezel) and Finch (Michael Emerson) investigate their new number: Vanessa Watkins (Kathleen Rose Perkins), a prominent New York prosecutor married to Jeremy Watkins (Daniel Cosgrove), a Defense Attorney who went missing some time ago. The police, led by Detective Gary Cameron (Paul Ben-Victor), arrest Vanessa, having found evidence that she killed her husband.

Fusco (Kevin Chapman) is asked to check on Vanessa in her interrogation room but finds her lawyer unconscious, half-naked and Vanessa nowhere to be seen. Reese and Shaw (Sarah Shahi) then discover Vanessa meeting with a recently paroled criminal named Reginald Marshall (Treach), who gives her a kilogram of cocaine. When a group of police, including Carter (Taraji P. Henson), closes in on her, Vanessa flees in a truck while insisting that she did not kill Jeremy. While talking to Reese, Carter notices her partner, Laskey (Brian Wiles), walking in and spotting them.

Shaw infiltrates Vanessa's friends group and finds that her best friend, Nicole (Annika Boras), had an affair with Jeremy. Finch investigates Jeremy's murder and learns that he owed a great deal of money to a gangster while it appears the DNA collected on the scene may be incriminating Vanessa. Reese takes Vanessa and brings her to a safe house where Reese, Finch and Carter will decide her fate in a trial, still unsure if she is guilty or innocent.

Vanessa explains that due to Jeremy's insurance terms, she would never receive money if he died and she found evidence of bribery in the precinct to incriminate her in the crime scene. Moments later, they declare that Vanessa is innocent but also discover that Jeremy, who turns out to be alive, has emptied his bank accounts. They then conclude that Jeremy framed her and Reese drops Vanessa at a bus station to flee as Jeremy may try to kill her. But the team discovers that Vanessa lied in the testimony, had a fake passport for herself and did not leave the town, she intends to kill Jeremy. Elsewhere, Laskey meets with Raymond Terney (Al Sapienza), revealing he is part of HR.

On his yacht, Jeremy is held at gunpoint by Vanessa. Reese arrives but instead of saving Jeremy or talking Vanessa out of it, he just leaves his gun next to Jeremy and leaves the yacht before untying it from the port. Reese then has Finch call the authorities as gunshots are heard from the yacht, not revealing who survived or died.

== Reception ==
=== Viewers ===
In its original American broadcast, "Reasonable Doubt" was seen by an estimated 12.69 million household viewers and gained a 2.2/6 ratings share among adults aged 18–49, according to Nielsen Media Research. This means that 2.2 percent of all households with televisions watched the episode, while 6 percent of all households watching television at that time watched it. This was a 9% increase in viewership from the previous episode, which was watched by 11.65 million viewers with a 2.0/6 in the 18-49 demographics. With these ratings, Person of Interest was the third most watched show on CBS for the night, behind NCIS: Los Angeles and NCIS, second on its timeslot and sixth for the night in the 18-49 demographics, behind The Biggest Loser, Chicago Fire, NCIS: Los Angeles, Agents of S.H.I.E.L.D., and NCIS.

With Live +7 DVR factored in, the episode was watched by 16.98 million viewers with a 3.3 in the 18-49 demographics.

=== Critical reviews ===
"Reasonable Doubt" received generally positive reviews from critics. Matt Fowler of IGN gave the episode a "good" 7.3 out of 10 and wrote in his verdict, "'Reasonable Doubt' took us back to what this show was designed to mostly be in the first place. A 'mystery of the week' action series. And yes, it's kind of hard to go back to that after seeing just how expansive the show became last year. Still, the episode wasn't without merit and single mysteries can still be worthwhile when done right. This one got a bit too pretzely at times, but I enjoyed Reese getting to be a bit 'anti-hero' there at the end."

Phil Dyess-Nugent of The A.V. Club gave the episode a "B−" grade and wrote, "I had a bad feeling going into this one, just based on the episode title. 'Reasonable Doubt': It sounds like it ought to be a movie from the '90s that starred Harrison Ford or Ashley Judd, with a script based on a New York Times bestseller written by a popular novelist with a law degree."
