= A Kid Like Jake =

2018 film by Silas Howard

- Theatrical release poster
- Directed by: Silas Howard
- Written by: Daniel Pearle
- Based on: A Kid Like Jake by Daniel Pearle
- Produced by: Jim Parsons; Todd Spiewak; Eric Norsoph; Paul Bernon; Rachel Xiaowen Song
- Starring: Claire Danes; Jim Parsons; Priyanka Chopra; Amy Landecker; Ann Dowd; Octavia Spencer
- Cinematography: Steven Capitano Calitri
- Edited by: Michael Taylor
- Music by: Roger Neill
- Production companies: That's Wonderful Productions; Burn Later Productions; Double Nickel Entertainment; Bankside Films; Head Gear Films; Metrol Technology; XS Media
- Distributed by: IFC Films
- Release dates: January 23, 2018 (Sundance); June 1, 2018 (United States)
- Running time: 92 minutes
- Country: United States
- Language: English

A Kid Like Jake is a 2018 American drama film directed by Silas Howard and written by Daniel Pearle, based on his own 2013 play of the same name. It stars Claire Danes, Jim Parsons (who also produced), Priyanka Chopra, Amy Landecker, Ann Dowd, and Octavia Spencer. It follows a married couple struggling to navigate their roles as parents to a gender-nonconforming child.

The film had its world premiere at the Sundance Film Festival on January 23, 2018. It was theatrically released in the United States on June 1, 2018, followed by video on demand on June 8, by IFC Films. It received mixed reviews from critics, and was nominated for Outstanding Film – Limited Release at the 30th GLAAD Media Awards.

== Synopsis ==
Loving parents Alex and Greg are faced with the daunting task of applying to private kindergartens in Brooklyn, New York City for their 4-year-old, Jake. Competing in this cutthroat environment means focusing on what is most unique about a child, forcing Alex and Greg to consider Jake's love of dresses, fairy tales, and princesses. These qualities never seemed unusual before, but when Jake begins to act out in preschool, Alex and Greg must find a way to support Jake's identity without losing each other in the process.

== Cast ==
- Claire Danes as Alex Wheeler, a nervous newly pregnant mother, Greg's wife and Jake's mom.
- Jim Parsons as Greg Wheeler, a licensed master social worker, Jake's father and Alex's husband
- Priyanka Chopra as Amal, Alex and Greg's single mother friend
- Leo James Davis as Jake Wheeler, Alex and Greg's preschool age son
- Amy Landecker as Sandra, Greg's client who is facing marital issues
- Ann Dowd as Catherine, Alex's mom
- Octavia Spencer as Judith "Judy" Lawson, Jake's preschool principal
- Aasif Mandvi as Darren, Amal's boyfriend
- Rhys Bhatia as Sanjay, Amal's child
- Annika Boras as Lynn

== Production ==
On February 24, 2017, it was announced that Claire Danes and Jim Parsons had been cast in the drama film adaptation of A Kid Like Jake, a play by Daniel Pearle who would also adapt; while Silas Howard would direct. Parsons and Todd Spiewak would be producing the film through their banner That's Wonderful Productions along with Eric Norsoph, Paul Bernon for Burn Later, and Rachel Song for XS Media.

On May 12, 2017, Octavia Spencer was cast in the film, while Priyanka Chopra, Ann Dowd, and Michaela Watkins were in negotiations to be cast. In July 2017, Amy Landecker joined the cast.

== Release ==
A Kid Like Jake had its world premiere at the Sundance Film Festival on January 23, 2018. Shortly after, IFC Films acquired North American distribution rights to the film. It was released in select theaters in New York on June 1, and simultaneously in Los Angeles and VOD on June 8, 2018.

== Reception ==
=== Box office ===
A Kid Like Jake grossed $58,403 in the United States and Canada, and $2,381 in other territories, for a worldwide total of $60,784.

=== Critical response ===
On the review aggregator website Rotten Tomatoes, 52% of 50 critics' reviews are positive, with an average rating of 6.1/10. The website's consensus reads: "A Kid Like Jake poses some truly interesting possibilities — many of which are lost in its overly cautious approach to an admittedly sensitive subject." Metacritic, which uses a weighted average, assigned the film a score of 58 out of 100, based on 20 critics, indicating "mixed or average" reviews.

Glenn Kenny of The New York Times stated, "A Kid Like Jake is humane, compassionate and strangely detached, almost to the point of inconsequentiality. [...] It's probably difficult to get a child to credibly perform this role. The actor is present, but the character is absent. And this throws the movie off balance."

Robert Abele of the Los Angeles Times called the film a "modest but effective parenting drama" and noted, "Though its vibe is often too meandering, A Kid Like Jake shows that even the most accepting of environments aren't immune to the vulnerabilities and worries coursing through any well-intended parent's soul."

Ann Hornaday of The Washington Post wrote, "The only thing missing from the film is its title character" and "A Kid Like Jake is coming from an unassailably benevolent place, but it insists on holding its nominal protagonist at frustrating arm's length."

Leslie Felperin of The Hollywood Reporter described the film as a "simply lovely comedy-drama" and commented, "Howard elicits superb performances not just from the leads but from the crack cast of supports."

David Ehrlich of IndieWire gave the film a "B−" grade and opined, "Pearle's script admirably tries to make this story feel much bigger than it ever could on stage, but the movie flounders whenever it tries to pad out the sharp conversation scenes from the original version, or provide them with new context."

Amy Nicholson of Variety wrote, "Howard's film is adamantly realistic, which means everyone behaves as politely as possible until hell breaks loose in the final act. The movie doesn't feel like it's going anywhere until it explodes, and the dazzling fireworks don't quite offset its long, seemingly aimless fuse."

Christy Lemire of RogerEbert.com gave the film 2.5 out of 4 stars and remarked, "Danes and Parsons have an effortless, evolving chemistry that's always compelling. They enjoy an easy banter with each other at the film's start, which gives way to more prickly exchanges as the story grows more complicated."
