= Silas Howard =

American director, writer, and actor

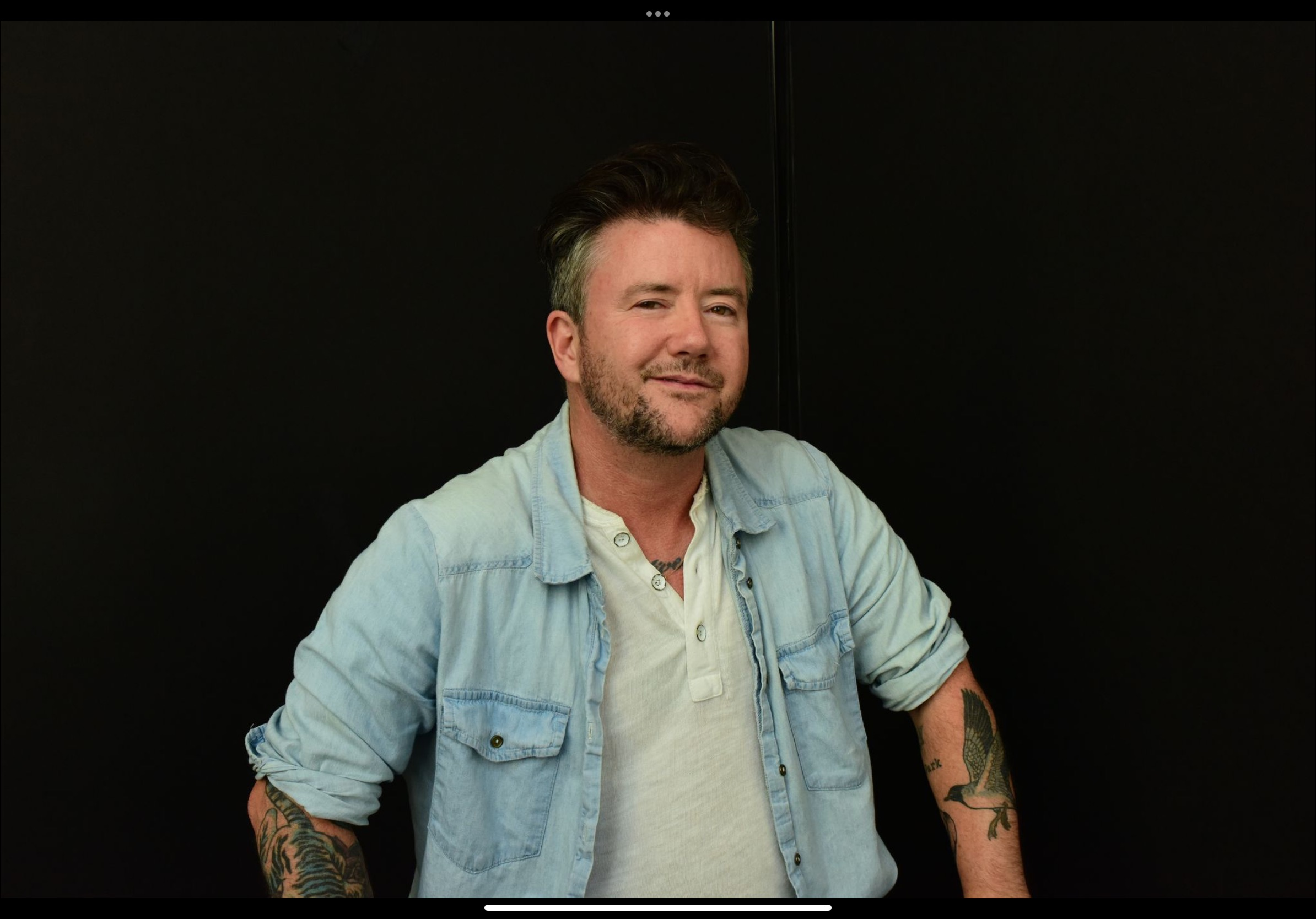
- Silas Howard in 2022
- Education: UCLA (MFA in directing)
- Occupations: Director; writer; actor
- Years active: 2001–present
- Notable work: By Hook or by Crook (2001); A Kid Like Jake (2018); Darby and the Dead (2022)
- Television: Transparent; Tales of the City; Dickinson
- Spouse: Naz Riahi
- Website: www.silashoward.com

Silas Howard is an American film and television director, writer, actor and musician. His first feature film By Hook or by Crook (2001), co-directed with Harry Dodge, is considered a seminal transmasculine film. Howard earned an MFA in directing at UCLA and is a 2015 Guggenheim Fellow. He began directing episodes during the second season of Transparent, making him the show's first transgender director.

== Early life ==
Howard grew up in Vermont. He arrived in San Francisco in the early 1990s. Howard played guitar for Tribe 8, a queer punk rock band originating in the San Francisco area. In San Francisco, he and Harry Dodge, a former band member, opened Red Dora's Bearded Lady Truckstop Café, where artists displayed their art.

== Career ==
Howard was a founding member of queercore band Tribe 8, and toured with the group across the U.S., Canada, and Europe. He was also cofounder of Red Dora's Bearded Lady Truckstop Café, a San Francisco coffeeshop that doubled as a gallery and performance space.

Howard co-wrote, co-directed, and co-stars with artist Harry Dodge in the 2001 feature film By Hook or by Crook. The plot follows two unlikely friends who commit petty crimes as they search for a path to understanding themselves and the outside world. "We totally home-schooled it, we made this feature film without having made a short or anything, because we're like, we have the urgent need to tell this story, to have these different faces on the screen." Howard later earned an MFA in directing at UCLA in 2008. He currently is a visiting lecturer at Cornell University. Twenty years after its release, the film has had a resurgence with a limited run at Alamo Draft House, as well as screenings at Outfest, Newfest, BFI, Metrograph and more. The film was also released on The Criterion Channel and widely lauded as a seminal trans masc film.

Howard was the first trans director for Transparent. The creator Joey Soloway wanted trans directors to tell their own stories. He directed the episodes "Bulnerable" (2015), "When the Battle Is Over", and "Just the Facts" (both in 2016). In September 2017's article in LGBT Weekly, one writer speaks of Howard as:

"A man whose ability to synthesize the messy intersection between life and art seem apparent yet remarkable... whose many previous videos speak volumes about his talent behind a camera, creates authentic and organic visions that rely on the inherent tension between the ideal and the real."

Howard's essays have been published in several anthologies including Zosia Mamet's My First Popsicle, Without a Net, edited by Michelle Tea and Live Through This, edited by Sabrina Chap. Howard wrote and performed with the spoken-word series, Sister Spit and toured a one-man show Thank you for Being Urgent about the real-life heartbreak of almost having his feature film about Billy Tipton greenlit and then watching it fall through the cracks.

Howard's third feature film A Kid Like Jake starring Claire Danes, Jim Parsons, Octavia Spencer and Transparent actress Amy Landecker premiered at the Sundance Film Festival in 2018. And his most recent feature, Darby and the Dead, a teen comedy about grief and friendship between girls premiered on Hulu.

In June 2019, to mark the 50th anniversary of the Stonewall Riots, sparking the start of the modern LGBTQ rights movement, Queerty named him one of the Pride50 "trailblazing individuals who actively ensure society remains moving towards equality, acceptance and dignity for all queer people."

== Personal life ==
Howard married writer and filmmaker Naz Riahi in 2023. He lives in Los Angeles.

== Filmography ==
=== Director ===
- Quantum Leap (2023)
- Darby and the Dead (2022)
- A League of Their Own (2022 TV series)
- Grand Army (2020 TV series)
- Everything's Gonna Be Okay (2020 TV series)
- Dickinson (2019-21 TV series, 9 episodes)
- The Affair (2019 TV series, 1 episode)
- Tales of the City - (2019 miniseries, 2 episodes)
- High Maintenance (2019 TV series, 1 episode)
- Pose (2018 TV series, 1 episode)
- Step Up: High Water (2018 TV series, 1 episode)
- A Kid Like Jake - (2018)
- More Than T (2017)
- This Is Us - (2016 TV series, 1 episode)
- The Fosters (2016 TV series, 1 episode)
- Faking It - (2016 TV series, 1 episode)
- Transparent - (2015-16 TV series)
- Sticks and Stones - (2014 short)
- Golden Age of Hustlers - (2014 Video short)
- Hudson Valley Ballers - (2013-15 TV series)
- Valencia: The Movie/S - (2013)
- Sunset Stories - 2012
- Brainstorm - 2009 (TV Series)
- Blink - 2007 (Short)
- How Do I Say This? - (2007 TV Series)
- Zero to Hero - (2006 Video Short)
- What I Love About Dying - (2006 Documentary short)
- Frozen Smile - (2005 Short)
- By Hook or by Crook - 2001

=== Writer ===
- Sticks and Stones - 2014 (Short)
- Blink - 2009 (Short) (Screenplay)
- How Do I Say This? 2007 (TV Series - 1 episode)
- Zero to Hero - 2006 (Video Short) (Story)
- Frozen Smile - 2005 (Short)
- By Hook or by Crook - 2001

=== Actor ===
- Happy Birthday, Marsha! (2016 Short) - Stonewall Manager
- Don't Mess with Texas (Short) - Al
- The Perfect Ones (Short) - Punk Gang Member
- By Hook or by Crook (2001) - Shy (Lead Role)
- Blue Diary (Short) - Narrator
- Framing Agnes (2022)

== Awards and nominations ==
=== Won ===
- Peabody Award - 2018 (POSE)
- Guggenheim Fellowship - 2015
- CAMMFest - 2013 / Emerging Filmmaker Award - Sunset Stories (shared with Ernesto Foronda)
- South by Southwest Film Festival - 2002 / Audience Award - Narrative Feature: By Hook or by Crook (shared with Harry Dodge)
- Philadelphia International Gay & Lesbian Film Festival - 2002 / Jury Prize Best Feature - Lesbian: By Hook or by Crook (shared with Harry Dodge)
- Paris International Lesbian and Feminist Film Festival - 2002 / Audience Award - Best Film By Hook or by Crook (shared with Harry Dodge)
- L.A. Outfest 2001 / Grand Jury Award -Outstanding Screenwriting: By Hook or by Crook (shared with Harry Dodge)
- Harry Dodge), Best Narrative Feature By Hook or by Crook (2001) (shared with Harry Dodge)
- Seattle Lesbian & Gay Film Festival - 2001 / Award for excellence -Best female director: By Hook or by Crook (shared with

=== Nominated ===
- VC FilmFest- Los Angeles Asian Pacific Film Festival - 2012 / Grand Jury Award -Best Narrative Feature: Sunset Stories (shared with Ernesto Foronda)
- South by Southwest Film Festival - 2012 / Audience Award - Emerging Visions: Sunset Stories (shared with Ernesto Foronda)

== See also ==
- List of transgender film and television directors
- CAAMFest - 2013 / Jury Award -Best Narrative - Sunset Stories (2012) (shared with Ernesto Foronda)
