= By any means necessary =

Expression from social and political discourse

This poster, based on a famous photograph from Ebony, popularized the slogan.

By any means necessary is an English phrase, or a translation of a French phrase that has been attributed to at least three famous sources. The earliest of these three sources is French leftist intellectual Jean-Paul Sartre in his 1948 play Dirty Hands where he used a French equivalent of the phrase. The second is Martinican anticolonialist intellectual Frantz Fanon who used another French equivalent of the phrase in his 1960 address to the Positive Action Conference in Accra, Ghana. The English phrase entered American civil rights culture through a speech given by Muslim minister Malcolm X at the Organization of Afro-American Unity's founding rally on 28 June 1964 in Manhattan, New York.

The phrase is generally considered to mean to leave open the option of all available tactics, strategies or methods for attaining or achieving desired ends, including any form or degree of violence as well as other methods typically considered unethical or immoral. It is part of a broader political idea that radical social change or liberation cannot be obtained by limiting one’s means to that which are considered "acceptable", debatably encapsulated in the suggestion by Audre Lorde that "The master’s tools will never dismantle the master’s house".

== Jean-Paul Sartre ==
The phrase is also a translation of a sentence used in French intellectual Jean-Paul Sartre's 1948 play Dirty Hands:

I was not the one to invent lies: they were created in a society divided by class and each of us inherited lies when we were born. It is not by refusing to lie that we will abolish lies: it is by eradicating class by any means necessary. [en usant de tous les moyens]

— Jean-Paul Sartre, Dirty Hands: Act 5, scene 3. 1948 (1963 translation).

== Frantz Fanon ==
The phrase is a translation of a sentence used in revolutionary philosopher Frantz Fanon's 1960 address to the Positive Action Conference for Peace and Security in Africa in Accra, Ghana, "Why we use violence", defending armed resistance against the colonial French as part of the Algerian War:

Violence in everyday behaviour, violence against the past that is emptied of all substance, violence against the future, for the colonial regime presents itself as necessarily eternal. We see, therefore, that the colonized people, caught in a web of a three-dimensional violence, a meeting point of multiple, diverse, repeated, cumulative violences, are soon logically confronted by the problem of ending the colonial regime by any means necessary. [par n'importe quel moyen]

— Frantz Fanon, Alienation and Freedom: Part 3, chapter 22, "Why we use violence". 1960.

== Malcolm X ==
It entered the popular culture through speeches given by Malcolm X (El-Hajj Malik El-Shabazz), founder of Muslim Mosque, Inc. and Organization of Afro-American Unity (OAAU), in the last year of his life. Its most prominent example was during the founding rally of the OAAU in 1964.

...We want freedom by any means necessary. We want justice by any means necessary. We want equality by any means necessary.

...We declare our right on this earth to be a man, to be a human being, to be respected as a human being, to be given the rights of a human being in this society, on this earth, in this day, which we intend to bring into existence by any means necessary.
...Anytime we know that an unjust condition exists and it is illegal and unjust, we will strike at it by any means necessary. And strike also at whatever and whoever gets in the way.
...And one thing that we are going to do, we're going to dispatch a wire, a telegram that is, in the name of the Organization of Afro-American Unity to Martin Luther King in St. Augustine, Florida, and to Jim Forman in Mississippi, worded in essence to tell them that if the federal government doesn't come to their aid, call on us. And we will take the responsibility of slipping some brothers into that area who know what to do by any means necessary.

...One of the best organized groups of black people in America was the Black Muslims. They've got all the machinery, don't think they haven't; and the experience where they know how to ease out in broad daylight or in dark and do whatever is necessary by any means necessary.

— Malcolm X, 28 June 1964.

So I don't believe in violence—that's why I want to stop it. And you can’t stop it with love, not love of those things down there, no. So, we only mean vigorous action in self-defense, and that vigorous action we feel we're justified in initiating by any means necessary. Now, the press, behind something like that, they call us racist and people who are “violent in reverse.” This is how they psycho you. They make you think that if you try to stop the Klan from lynching you, you're practicing “violence in reverse.”

— Malcolm X, 13 February 1965.

=== Mandela recusal ===
In the final scene of the 1992 movie Malcolm X, Nelson Mandela—then recently released after 27 years of political imprisonment—appears as a schoolteacher in a Soweto classroom reciting Malcolm X's speech. Yet Mandela informed director Spike Lee that he could not utter the famous final phrase "by any means necessary" on camera, fearing that the apartheid government would use it against him if he did. Lee obliged, and the final seconds of the film feature black-and-white footage of Malcolm X himself delivering the phrase.

== See also ==
- Countering violent extremism
- Deradicalization
- Incitement
- The end justifies the means
- By hook or by crook
- Nation of domination
- Contentious politics
