= Harry Dodge =

American artist (born 1966)

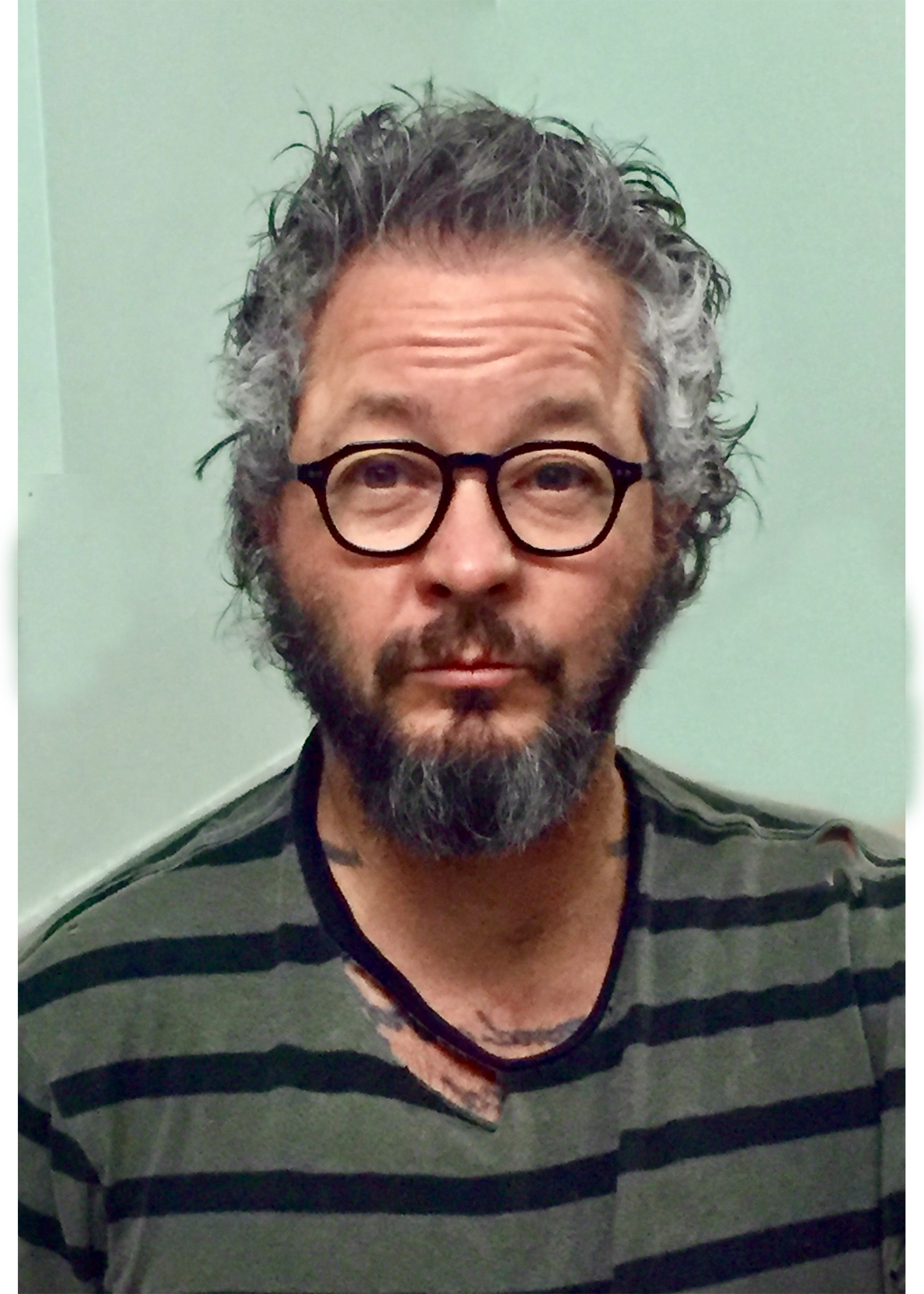
- Born: 1966 (age 59–60); San Francisco, California, U.S.
- Education: Bard College
- Occupations: sculptor, performer, video artist, professor, writer.
- Employer: California Institute of the Arts
- Spouse: Maggie Nelson
- Children: 2

Harry Dodge (born 1966) is an American sculptor, performer, video artist, professor, and writer.

His solo exhibitions have included works in New York, Los Angeles and Connecticut, while his group exhibitions have taken place at The New Museum, the Whitney Biennial, the Getty Museum and the Hammer Museum, among others. He was the recipient of a Guggenheim Fellowship in 2017 and is the author of the book My Meteorite: Or, Without the Random There Can Be No New Thing (2020). He lives and works in Los Angeles, California.

== Early life ==
Dodge was born in 1966 in San Francisco, California. Dodge earned an MFA degree in Fine Art in 2002 from the Milton Avery School of the Arts at Bard College.

== Career ==
In the early 1990s, Dodge was one of the founders of and curators for the San Francisco community-based performance space, Red Dora's Bearded Lady Coffeehouse. During this time Dodge wrote, directed, and performed several evening-length, monologue-based performances, including "Muddy Little River" (1996) and "From Where I'm Sitting (I Can Only Reach Your Ass)" (1997).

In the late 1990s, Dodge co-wrote, directed, edited and starred in (with Silas Howard) a narrative feature film, By Hook or By Crook, which premiered at the Sundance Film Festival (2002), and received five Best Feature awards at various film festivals. Dodge also performed in the 2000 John Waters film Cecil B. Demented.

From 2004 to 2008, while continuing to make solo work, Dodge formed half of a video-making collaboration with artist Stanya Kahn. Dodge also worked with director Jenni Olson, narrating her 2005 experimental film The Joy of Life.

Since 2008, Dodge has focused on sculpture, drawing, video, and writing. His interdisciplinary practice is “characterized by its explorations of relation, materiality and ecstatic contamination”. Artforum says his “dense, idea-rich” works are “designed to hold ideas of individuality and multiplicity in tension and to create spaces of dynamic slippage between the whole and its parts.”

Dodge teaches in the School of Art at California Institute of the Arts (CalArts) and in sculpture program of the Milton Avery School of the Arts at Bard College.

== Collections ==
Dodge's collaborative work with Stanya Kahn, Can't Swallow It, Can't Spit It Out, is part of the permanent collection of the Museum of Modern Art in New York. Dodge's solo work is also included in the collections of the Museum of Contemporary Art, Los Angeles, and the Hammer Museum.

== Awards ==
In 2017 Dodge was awarded a Guggenheim Fellowship. In 2012, he received an Art Matters grant.

His co-directed film By Hook or By Crook received several awards, including Best Feature, Audience Award at Outfest Los Angeles Lesbian & Gay Film Festival; Best Screenplay, Grand Jury Prize at Outfest Los Angeles Lesbian & Gay Film Festival; Best Feature, Jury Prize at Seattle Lesbian & Gay Film Festival; Best New Director, Jury Prize at Seattle Lesbian & Gay Film Festival; Best Feature, Audience Award at Mardi Gras Festival, Australia; Best Feature, Audience Award at South by Southwest Film Festival; Best Feature, Jury Award at Philadelphia Lesbian & Gay Film Festival.

== Personal life ==
Dodge is married to the author Maggie Nelson, with whom he has a child. He has an older child from a previous relationship.

Dodge uses the pronoun he, but has long expressed disinterest in gender designations. He identifies as a butch. In a 2017 interview with Lunch Ticket he discusses an interest in Jane Bennett's formulation of Adorno’s theory of "non-identity", or "non-language knowings".

== Bibliography ==
- Dodge, Harry (2020). My Meteorite: Or, Without the Random There Can Be No New Thing. Penguin Books. ISBN 978-0143134367.
