= By Hook or by Crook (2001 film) =

2001 film by Harry Dodge

- Directed by: Harry Dodge; Silas Howard
- Written by: Harry Dodge; Silas Howard; Stanya Kahn
- Produced by: Harry Dodge; Silas Howard; Steak House
- Starring: Harry Dodge; Silas Howard; Stanya Kahn
- Cinematography: Ann T. Rossetti
- Edited by: Harry Dodge
- Music by: Carla Bozulich
- Production companies: Steakhaus Productions; NGB Productions
- Distributed by: Artistic License
- Release dates: June 17, 2001 (Frameline Film Festival); October 25, 2002 (United States)
- Running time: 95 minutes
- Country: United States
- Language: English

By Hook or by Crook is a 2001 buddy drama film written, directed by, and starring Harry Dodge and Silas Howard. The story follows two unlikely friends as they commit petty crimes and figure out their places in the world.

The film premiered at the 2001 Frameline Film Festival and went on to screen at the 2002 Sundance Film Festival. It won multiple awards on the film festival circuit, including the Audience Award for Best Narrative Feature at the 2002 SXSW Film Festival.

== Plot ==
Shy, a transgender man, leaves his small town in Kansas for San Francisco after the death of his father. Along the way, he encounters Valentine, a quirky adoptee in search of his birth mother. An immediate kinship is sparked between the two men and they become partners in crime with Val's lover Billie to stay financially afloat. The duo faces money troubles, emotional problems, and physical confrontations as they learn to trust and support each other in pursuit of their goals.

== Cast ==
- Silas Howard as Shy
- Harry Dodge as Valentine (as Harriet Dodge)
- Stanya Kahn as Billie
- Carina Gia as Isabelle
- James Cotner as Attacker
- Joan Jett as News interviewee
- Kris Kovic as Crazy nut in park
- Maia Lorian as Parisol girl
- Tina Marie Murray as Ms. Red
- Aldo Pisano as Driver
- Nancy Stone as Waitress

== Production ==
The film is the directorial debut of both Howard and Dodge and was shot on mini DV.

It was produced by Howard, Dodge, and Steak House of Steakhaus Productions.

Carla Bozulich of the Geraldine Fibbers wrote the score for the film. The soundtrack also features a song that Carla Bozulich co-wrote with the Geraldine Fibbers, "Lilybelle", that was later covered by Kiki and Herb.

== Release ==
The film had its world premiere at the Frameline Film Festival in San Francisco on June 17, 2001. In addition, it screened at the 2002 Sundance Film Festival. It was given a limited theatrical release on October 25, 2002.

== Reception ==
On review aggregator Rotten Tomatoes, By Hook or by Crook has an approval rating of 64% based on 14 reviews.

Dave Kehr of The New York Times wrote the film "is, like its principal characters, a bit messy and maladroit but not without a certain charm", and "the humanity of the characters shines through, giving face and form to a subculture the movies have largely neglected". TV Guide described the film as "An appealing, if decidedly unconventional, buddy picture that seems to channel Midnight Cowboy (1969) while going its own quirky way."

== Awards ==
- 2001 LA Outfest: Audience Award: Outstanding Narrative Feature, Silas Howard and Harry Dodge; and Grand Jury Award: Outstanding Screenwriting, Silas Howard and Harry Dodge
- 2001 Seattle Lesbian & Gay Film Festival, Award for Excellence: Best Female Director, Silas Howard and Harry Dodge, and Award for Excellence: Best Narrative Feature, Silas Howard and Harry Dodge
- 2002 Paris Lesbian Film Festival, Winner of Audience Award: Best Film, Silas Howard and Harry Dodge
- 2002 Philadelphia International Gay & Lesbian Film Festival Jury Prize: Best Feature - Lesbian, Silas Howard and Harry Dodge
- 2002 SXSW Film Festival: Audience Award: Narrative Feature, Silas Howard and Harry Dodge
