= A Certain Magical Index: The Movie – The Miracle of Endymion =

2013 Japanese animated film by Hiroshi Nishikiori

- Theatrical release poster
- Kanji: 劇場版 とある魔術の禁書目録(インデックス) エンデュミオンの奇蹟
- Revised Hepburn: Gekijōban Toaru Majutsu no Indekkusu: Endyumion no Kiseki
- Directed by: Hiroshi Nishikiori
- Screenplay by: Hiroyuki Yoshino
- Story by: Kazuma Kamachi
- Based on: A Certain Magical Index by Kazuma Kamachi
- Produced by: Nobuhiro Nakayama; Kentarō Hattori; Kazuma Miki; Yasutaka Kimura; Satoshi Fujita
- Starring: Atsushi Abe; Yuka Iguchi; Rina Satō; Sachika Misawa
- Cinematography: Shingo Fukuyo
- Edited by: Shigeru Nishiyama
- Music by: Maiko Iuchi; Keiji Inai; Yasunori Iwasaki; Hayato Matsuo
- Production company: J.C.Staff
- Distributed by: Warner Bros. Pictures Japan
- Release date: February 23, 2013 (Japan)
- Running time: 90 minutes
- Country: Japan
- Language: Japanese
- Box office: US$4.7 million

A Certain Magical Index: The Movie – The Miracle of Endymion (Japanese: 劇場版 とある魔術の禁書目録(インデックス) エンデュミオンの奇蹟, Hepburn: Gekijōban Toaru Majutsu no Indekkusu: Endyumion no Kiseki) is a 2013 Japanese animated film based on an original story written by Kazuma Kamachi featuring the characters of his light novel series A Certain Magical Index. Produced by J.C.Staff and distributed by Warner Bros. Pictures Japan, the film is directed by Hiroshi Nishikiori from a script written by Hiroyuki Yoshino, and stars Atsushi Abe, Yuka Iguchi, Rina Satō, and Sachika Misawa. In the film, Toma Kamijo and Index meet Arisa Meigo, who has a mysterious past, as magicians target her for being a threat to the balance between the world of magic and science.

An anime film for the Index franchise was announced in October 2011. In July 2012, Nishikiori and Yoshino were confirmed to be directing and writing the film, respectively, with the cast of the franchise's anime television series returning to reprise their roles. Additional cast to voice the original characters in the film were announced in October 2012. The film was completed a week before its premiere in February 2013.

A Certain Magical Index: The Movie – The Miracle of Endymion premiered in Japan on February 23, 2013, and was released in the United States on January 12, 2015. The film grossed over $4 million at the Japanese box office.

== Plot ==
The Spaceplane Orion crash lands without any reported casualties among its 88 passengers, regarding the incident as a miracle. Three years later, (Note: Set shortly after the Remnant incident featured in seventh and eighth episodes of A Certain Magical Index II (2010)) Academy City nears completion of Endymion, a space elevator capable of bringing people into space without the need for spacecraft. Toma Kamijo and Index meet a singer and Level 0 esper named Arisa Meigo. While hanging out with them, Arisa learns that she passed an audition to be the campaign girl for Endymion. Later night, they are suddenly attacked by Stiyl Magnus and the witches from the Church of England named Marie Spearhead, Mallybath Blackball, and Jane Elves. The magicians encounter the Black Crow Unit, a private security organization led by Shutaura Sequenzia, and forces to retreat with assistance from Kaori Kanzaki. They leave Toma a cryptic message indicating that Arisa could bring a war between the magic and science sides.

Shutaura warns Toma to not get involved with Arisa. He offers Arisa to stay with him and Index to his dorm until her performance. Because Toma needs to take supplementary lessons, Mikoto Misaka and her friends accompany Arisa to a promotional performance held at a mall, where they also performed as backup dancers. During the event, Toma witnesses a battle between Shutaura and a mysterious male automaton who destroyed the stage. He then learns from her about her inability to process music and disbelief in miracles. Later night, Arisa explains to Toma her memory loss of before the past three years. As Toma meets up with Motoharu Tsuchimikado and Kaori, who believed in the possibility of Arisa being a Saint, Stiyl and his group kidnap Arisa and fight Shutaura and the Black Crow Unit while they try to escape. Stiyl explains to Toma about the Endymion being a makeshift Tower of Babel, which could be turned into a magical device with the combination of a Saint's power. Shutaura captures Arisa and brings her to the CEO of Orbit Portal Company named Ladylee Tangleroad.

Shutaura learns that Ladylee killed her father named Daedalus Sequenzia, who revealed to be the only casualty of the Orion incident without public knowledge, and stabs her but Ladylee remains alive and orders her two automatons to capture Shutaura. As Arisa is forced to sing in Endymion to activate a large magic circle above Earth, Toma and Index travel to space with Kaori's help. Shutaura also makes her way up after being rescued by her comrades. She confronts Ladylee, who sought Arisa's power to break her curse of immortality, but the ensuing battle with her automatons causes a crack in the space station, which would inevitably collapse and fall towards Earth. Arisa sings to protect the visitors present while Shutaura attempts to stop her but she is confronted by Toma. Index confronts Ladylee while Mikoto, Accelerator, and Stiyl destroy some explosive bolts to purge Endymion from the ground. Toma uses his Imagine Breaker on Shutaura, causing her to remember how Arisa was born out of her wish to save everyone on the plane even at the cost of those important to her. Arisa and Shutaura then sing together, which combined with Index's work, to break Ladylee's spell, stopping Endymion from falling onto Earth and resulting in the merging of the two as one. In the aftermath, Toma and Index can hear Arisa's song off in the distance.

== Voice cast ==
Character	Japanese	English
Toma Kamijo	Atsushi Abe	Micah Solusod
Index	Yuka Iguchi	Monica Rial
Mikoto Misaka	Rina Satō	Brittney Karbowski
Arisa Meigo	Sachika Misawa	Megan Shipman
Shutaura Sequenzia	Yōko Hikasa	Whitney Rodgers
Ladylee Tangleroad	Ayane Sakura	Maxey Whitehead
Kuroko Shirai	Satomi Arai	Alison Viktorin
Kazari Uiharu	Aki Toyosaki	Cherami Leigh
Ruiko Saten	Kanae Itō	Brina Palencia
Stiyl Magnus	Kishō Taniyama	Robert McCollum
Jane Elves	Risa Taneda	Sarah Wiedenheft
Mallybath Blackball	Megumi Han	Haley Esposito
Marie Spearhead	Asami Seto	Maeghan Albach
Kaori Kanzaki	Shizuka Itō	Morgan Garrett
Motoharu Tsuchimikado	Anri Katsu	Newton Pittman
Komoe Tsukuyomi	Kimiko Koyama	Jad Saxton
Sisters	Nozomi Sasaki	Brittney Karbowski
Accelerator	Nobuhiko Okamoto	Austin Tindle
Last Order	Rina Hidaka	Brittney Karbowski
Aiho Yomikawa	Yūko Kaida	Martha Harms
Laura Stuart	Ayako Kawasumi	Carli Mosier
Aleister Crowley	Toshihiko Seki	Chuck Huber
Mitsuko Kongō	Minako Kotobuki	Jamie Marchi
Kinuho Wannai	Haruka Tomatsu	Kristi Kang
Ma'aya Awatsuki	Yoshino Nanjō	Tia Ballard
Pierce Aogami	Yoshihisa Kawahara	Scott Freeman
Aisa Himegami	Mamiko Noto	Lindsay Seidel
Seiri Fukiyose	Ayumi Fujimura	Skyler McIntosh
Heaven Canceller	Yutaka Nakano	Cole Brown
Daedalus Sequenzia	Atsushi Ono	Jarrod Greene
Crow 7	Nobunaga Shimazaki	Josh Grelle

== Production ==
=== Development ===
As exemplified by the catchphrase "When science and magic intersect, the story begins," the Toaru series is rooted in the existence of supernatural, invisible forces such as magic and psychic powers. This time, however, I wanted to depict the idea of making miracles happen by reaching out for them, rather than just waiting for some mysterious power - such as fate. I depicted "miracles" as the third power along with science and magic.

— Director Hiroshi Nishikiori on the film's title

Initial talks for an anime film based on A Certain Magical Index light novel series by Kazuma Kamachi began around the end of A Certain Magical Index II (2010). In October, the start of the film's production was announced at the Dengeki Bunko Autumn Festival 2011. The content of the film began to develop by the end of 2011, with the producers requesting a "song foil festival atmosphere" theme.

In March 2012, Index light novel editor Kazuma Miki announced that Kamachi would be writing an original story for the film instead of adapting the light novel's fifteenth volume. The film's setting was confirmed to be taking place between the seventh and eighth episodes of Index II. The film took inspiration from the Greek mythology for the title "Endymion", the name of the space elevator in the film, and the origin of Ladylee Tangleroad, one of the new characters designed by Haimura Kiyotaka. In June 2012, the film's premiere was announced to be in February 2013. By the following month, J.C.Staff was announced to be animating the film.

=== Pre-production ===
In July 2012, Hiroshi Nishikiori and Hiroyuki Yoshino were announced as the film's director and scriptwriter, respectively, along with other staff, including character designer Yuichi Tanaka and cinematographer Shingo Fukuyo. In the same month, cast of the Index franchise were confirmed to be reprising their roles in the film, including Atsushi Abe as Toma Kamijo, Yuka Iguchi as Index, Rina Satō as Mikoto Misaka, Shizuka Itō as Kaori Kanzaki, Kishō Taniyama as Stiyl Magnus, Mamiko Noto as Aisa Himegami, Anri Katsu as Motoharu Tsuchimikado, Nobuhiko Okamoto as Accelerator, Nozomi Sasaki as the Sisters, Yoshihisa Kawahara as Pierce Aogami, Kimiko Koyama as Komoe Tsukuyomi, Satomi Arai as Kuroko Shirai, and Aki Toyosaki as Kazari Uiharu.

In October 2012, Yōko Hikasa, Ayane Sakura, and Sachika Misawa were announced to be respectively voicing the new characters Shutaura Sequenzia, Tangleroad, and Arisa Meigo. Nishikiori revealed that Misawa was chosen to voice Meigo because they needed "someone who could act and sing at the same time".

=== Animation ===
3D computer graphics were used for the film's mecha battles, live scenes, and background art, such as Kamijo's apartment, that was previously drawn by hand. Nishikiori revealed their decision to use 3DCG instead of the traditional method of "creating CG and art after storyboarding" was to "create a sense of scale and theatricality with limited resources". Sanzigen's CG modelers and animators and the CG department of J.C.Staff managed to handle one of the issues in animating the film such as expressing the lighting.

=== Post-production ===
Shigeru Nishiyama served as the film's editor. The cast took fifteen hours in one day to complete their voice work. In February 2013, producer Nobuhiro Nakayama revealed that the film was completed in a week before its theatrical release.

== Music ==
Maiko Iuchi of I've Sound was revealed to be composing A Certain Magical Index: The Movie – The Miracle of Endymion along with the Japanese music production company Imagine in July 2012, after previously doing so for A Certain Magical Index (2008), A Certain Scientific Railgun (2009), and Index II. The film's ending theme music, titled "Fixed Star", was composed by Tomoyuki Nakazawa and performed by Mami Kawada. Misawa performed the insert songs in the film: "Gloria" (グローリア), "Reasonable Distance" (アタリマエの距離, Atarimae no Kyori), "Brand New Bright Step", "Telepath ~Tower of Light~" (telepath ～光の塔～, telepath ~Hikari no Tou~), "I Hope It'll Be Sunny Tomorrow" (明日、晴れるかな, Ashita, Hareru Kana), and "Over". The original soundtrack is included in the film's Blu-ray and DVD that were released in Japan on August 28, 2013.

All music is composed by Iuchi, except where indicated.

A Certain Magical Index: The Movie – The Miracle of Endymion Original Soundtrack track listing
No.	Title	Composer(s)	Length
1.	"Title Back"		0:26
2.	"Hey, Toma?"		1:50
3.	"Movie Hurry Up"		1:00
4.	"You Could Call That My Dream, I Guess"		2:08
5.	"Movie Daily Life"		0:43
6.	"Movie Into Darkness"		0:21
7.	"What's Your Problem!"		1:58
8.	"Fortis931"		4:23
9.	"...I Want to Sing"		2:31
10.	"Prelude from Suite No. 1 in G major, BWV 1007"	Johann Sebastian Bach	2:35
11.	"Movie Summer Sunshine"		1:12
12.	"Movie Memories"		1:57
13.	"Movie Tokiwadai Dormitory"		1:35
14.	"We, the Black Crow Unit, Will Protect Arisa Meigo"		2:04
15.	"People are Lazy and Stupid"		2:29
16.	"Movie Inquisition"		0:26
17.	"Movie Vampire Killer"		1:08
18.	"Arisa Is a Saint?"		0:55
19.	"Innocentius"		2:53
20.	"Sumerian Ziggurat"		1:29
21.	"And Only the Miracle Remained"		2:34
22.	"Destroy the Core"		1:38
23.	"I'll Sing for Those People's Sake"		1:07
24.	"What That Bastard Did!!"		1:13
25.	"I Have Lived for a Thousand Years"		1:51
26.	"Those Cursed by Magic"		4:01
27.	"That's Why I Deny the Existence of Miracles"		2:17
28.	"Over" (performed by Sachika Misawa)		3:23
29.	"Movie Strain"		1:08
Total length:			53:14

== Marketing ==
The buyers of advance tickets that were first released in July 2012 received the film's clear file. The first promotional video for the film was released on August 10, 2012, which was also shown at the 82nd Comiket in Tokyo. In November 2012, a two-minute trailer for the film was released. In January 2013, a new trailer and two television commercials for the film were released on its official website. Kamachi wrote a light novel titled A Certain Magical Index: Road to Endymion, which was given to the first 103,000 viewers of the film on its opening day. Promotional partners for the film included Tokyo Monorail, web hosting service provider Sakura Internet, and Lawson.

== Release ==
=== Theatrical ===
A Certain Magical Index: The Movie – The Miracle of Endymion was released in Japan on February 23, 2013. Its first screening was held at Kadokawa Cinema Shinjuku in Tokyo, with Abe, Iguchi, Satō, Misawa, Nishikiori, and Kawada present during a stage greeting. In the United States, Funimation released a free screening of the film at the Alamo Drafthouse Cinema in Missouri, New York, Texas, and Virginia on January 12, 2015, with additional two theaters to screen it in other parts of Texas on January 13 and 19.

=== Home media ===
Geneon Universal Entertainment released the Blu-ray and DVD of A Certain Magical Index: The Movie – The Miracle of Endymion in Japan on August 28, 2013. The special edition includes bonus videos of the group interview and roundtable discussion with the main cast, and an original video animation. It also bundles with a bonus video of the stage greeting held in 2013 at Kadokawa Cinema Shinjuku and Cinema City in Tachikawa. By the end of 2013, Oricon reported a total sale of 42,566 copies of the film's Blu-ray release, making it the 11th top-selling animation Blu-ray discs in Japan for that year. The film was released on Hulu in Japan on March 24, 2022.

The film's Blu-ray and DVD combo set was released in North America by Funimation on February 17, 2015, and in the United Kingdom by Manga Entertainment on September 11, 2017. Crunchyroll added the film on September 18, 2017, while Netflix released it on July 1, 2021. Muse Asia streamed the film on their official YouTube channel on July 24, 2022.

== Reception ==
=== Box office ===
A Certain Magical Index: The Movie – The Miracle of Endymion grossed $4.7 million at the Japanese box office.

The film opened in 30 theaters in Japan and earned $1.1 million in its opening weekend, ranking third behind Ted (2012). It earned $548,663 in its second weekend, coming in seventh; $477,674 in its third weekend, coming in eighth; and $253,314 in its fourth weekend, coming in twelfth.

=== Critical response ===
Gareth Evans of Starburst lauded A Certain Magical Index: The Movie – The Miracle of Endymion for its pacing and action scenes that "come at the right time to punctuate the plot". Theron Martin of Anime News Network graded the film "C+", stating that it was a "hodgepodge of insufficiently developed and explored story elements padded out with a ton of cameos and plenty of action".

=== Scientific accuracy ===
Suichi Ohno, chairman of the Japan Space Elevator Association, discussed the science behind Endymion in the film. According to Ohno, tethers of Endymion would not stand upright in the Tokyo area because its shape will extend instead toward the equator, the suitable site for building a space elevator, and climb as it approaches the imaginary line. The film indicated that Endymion was completed in three years, but the National Aeronautics and Space Administration's 2003 report stated that building a space elevator takes several years to complete, while Obayashi Corporation's plan will take 18 years to build the structure.

== Manga adaptation ==
A manga adaptation of A Certain Magical Index: The Movie – The Miracle of Endymion illustrated by Ryōsuke Asakura, titled A Certain Magical Index: The Miracle of Endymion (とある魔術の禁書目録 エンデュミオンの奇蹟, Toaru Majutsu no Indekkusu: Endyumion no Kiseki), was serialized in Square Enix's Monthly Shōnen Gangan magazine from February 12 to October 12, 2013. A total of two tankōbon volumes had been published in Japan by Square Enix from August 27 to October 22, 2013.

No.	Japanese release date	Japanese ISBN
1	August 27, 2013	978-4-7575-4035-4
1. "The Miracle Girl" (奇蹟の少女, Kiseki no Shōjo); 2. "The Girl's Dream" (少女の夢, Shōjo no Yume); 3. "Dream and Hope" (夢と希望, Yume to Kibō); 4. "Hope and Conspiracy" (希望と陰謀, Kibō to Inbō)
2	October 22, 2013	978-4-7575-4088-0
5. "Beginning of the Conspiracy" (陰謀の始まり, Inbō no Hajimari); 6. "The Beginning Song" (始まりの歌, Hajimari no Uta); 7. "Promise to Sing" (歌う約束, Utau Yakusoku); 8. "Promise of Endymion" (約束の地エンデュミオン, Yakusoku no Chi Endyumion); Last. "Miracle of Endymion" (エンデュミオンの奇蹟, Endyumion no Kiseki)

== Original video animation ==
A Certain Magical Index-tan: The Movie – The Miracle of Endymion... Happened, or Maybe Not (劇場版とある魔術の禁書目録(インデックス)たん-エンデュミオンの奇蹟-があったりなかったり, Gekijōban Toaru Majutsu no Indekkusu: Endyumion no Kiseki Ga Attari Nakattari) is the original video animation included in the Blu-ray and DVD of A Certain Magical Index: The Movie – The Miracle of Endymion, which sees the return of a chibified Index named Index-tan and parodies the events of the film.

=== Plot ===
Toma finds Index-tan hanging on his apartment's balcony, only for her to fall; Index-tan complains about the producers forgetting to make bonus footage while producing the film and iterates that she is the main heroine; Kazari praises civil engineering, while Kuroko Shirai warns not to question about the film's plot hole; Arisa, speaking in her native dialect, reveals her reason for aiming to become an idol; Arisa aggressively writes a song for the film while being naked; Kazari Uiharu praises Tanashi Tower and jokingly reveals how the holes in some designs are to make them lighter, referencing Yutaka Izubuchi's hole designs in his works; Kaori jokes about fighting in vacuum space; A segment called "Ask A Certain Magical Index-tan: The Movie Anything" is hosted by Lola Stuart to answer questions about the film; Arisa sings a song comparing Academy City and her voice actress' hometown in Yamanashi; Toma, believing in gender equality, punches Shutaura; and Toma and Index-tan talk about how the series is brought to the silver screen.
