= A Certain Magical Index season 3 =

2010 Japanese television season

A Certain Magical Index
- Season 3
- First home media volume cover, featuring various characters that appear in the season
- Starring: Atsushi Abe; Yuka Iguchi; Rina Satō; Nobuhiko Okamoto; Satoshi Hino
- No. of episodes: 26

Release
- Original network: AT-X
- Original release: October 5, 2018 – April 5, 2019

Season chronology
- ← Previous; Season 2

The third season of the Japanese animated television series A Certain Magical Index, marketed as A Certain Magical Index III, is based on the light novel series of the same name written by Kazuma Kamachi and illustrated by Kiyotaka Haimura. The season follows Toma Kamijo and Index in their journey to stop the God's Right Seat of the Roman Catholic Church and their plans that would lead to World War III. Produced by J.C.Staff, the season saw Hiroshi Nishikiori and Hiroyuki Yoshino respectively serving as director and series composition writer.

Atsushi Abe and Yuka Iguchi reprise their respective roles as Kamijo and Index. They are joined by Rina Satō, Nobuhiko Okamoto, and Satoshi Hino as the season's main cast, with the latter voicing Shiage Hamazura, who appeared in the second season finale. The third season was announced in October 2017 as part of the "A Certain Project 2018" event and adapts the final nine volumes of the light novel. The third season consists of 26 episodes and ran on AT-X from October 5, 2018, to April 5, 2019, with other networks following hours later.

== Episodes ==
No. overall	No. in season	Title	Directed by	Written by	Storyboarded by	Original release date
49	1	"Unrest"; Transliteration: "Konran" (Japanese: 混乱)	Yoshiyuki Nogami	Hiroyuki Yoshino	Hiroshi Nishikiori	October 5, 2018
Tension grows between the Roman Catholic Church and Academy City since the attack by Vento of the Front. Tōma Kamijō has an unlucky day when a hungry Index bites him, Seiri Fukiyose hits his head with a ball, his teacher named Suama Oyafune attacks him for walking in her removing her skirt, and Mikoto Misaka attacks him after she found a selfie of him and her mother on his phone. Later, he is forced to follow an old woman named Monaka Oyafune, who turns out to be Suama's mother, to an empty park. Monaka reveals being one of the city's Board of Directors and her fear about the upcoming war so she wants him to investigate whether the recent worldwide protests against Academy City are the works of the Roman Catholic Church. Motoharu Tsuchimikado shows up and shoots Monaka, but the latter explains that she ordered him to shoot her to protect her family and satisfy the rest of the pro-war Board of Directors who would find out her secret meeting with Tōma soon. Tōma agrees to work with her and follows Motoharu as they head to Avignon, France via a supersonic jet.
50	2	"The Right Seat of God"; Transliteration: "Kami no Useki" (Japanese: 神の右席)	Yoshiyuki Nogami	Hiroyuki Yoshino	Kiyoko Sayama	October 12, 2018
Tōma parachutes into a river and nearly drowns, but Itsuwa of the Amakusa Church saves him. Tōma explains his mission to find the Document of Constantine, a magical artifact with the power to make whatever the Pope says seem to be the absolute truth, which results in worldwide anti-Academy City riots. While in a café, Tōma and Itsuwa flee when the rioters realize he is connected to Academy City. In London, Stiyl Magnus and Agnese Sanctis interrogate prisoners Lidvia Lorenzetti and Biagio Busoni for information about God's Right Seat. Lidvia explains they are four special individuals who sacrificed their ability to use normal magic in exchange for divine powers to rid themselves of the original sin and become closer to God. As they evade the rioters, Tōma and Itsuwa receive a call from Motoharu instructing them to find one of the city's ley lines for his Imagine Breaker to destroy the effects of the C-Document. Just before disrupting one located in a museum, they are attacked by one of the members of God's Right Seat named Terra of the Left.
51	3	"The Document of C"; Transliteration: "Shī Bunsho" (Japanese: C文書)	Hiroshi Nishikiori	Hiroyuki Yoshino	Shingo Yuki	October 19, 2018
Motoharu joins Tōma and Itsuwa in their fight against Terra, who quickly escapes after unmanned powered suits sent by Academy City arrived. He then stays behind to stop them, while Tōma and Itsuwa chase after Terra to Palais des Papes. Upon arriving, Tōma calls Mikoto to check some news in Academy City. Mikoto informs him about the city sending a cleanup operation to Avignon to deal with some dangerous religious group, but their phone call is cut short when Terra arrives with the C-Document. During their fight, Terra figures out Tōma still has not attained the full power of Imagine Breaker due to his lost memories. Tōma takes advantage of a weakness in Terra's abilities to defeat him and destroy the C-Document. Just as Tōma is about to learn from Terra the secrets of his right hand's power, a squad of stealth bombers boarded by Accelerator attack the palace, allowing Terra to escape. Later in Vatican City, Terra is killed by a member of God's Right Seat named Acqua of the Back for involving civilians to make adjustments to his spell. Acqua decides to deal with the conflict on his own after the recent failures of Vento and Terra.
52	4	"The Dark Side of Academy City"; Transliteration: "Gakuen-toshi Anbu" (Japanese: 学園都市暗部)	Yoshihiro Mori	Ryunosuke Kingetsu	Yūichi Nihei	October 26, 2018
GROUP captures an unnamed individual known as "Management", who is later killed by Banka Yobō. Etzali investigates Management's apartment when BLOCK arrives, forcing him to disguise himself as one of them. GROUP learns that Management sold a weapon to a sniper named Chimitsu Sunazara, who planned to target Monaka, but Accelerator stops the assassination attempt. They soon learn that it was a diversion from SCHOOL's actual plan of targeting the particle engineering laboratory. Other teams like MEMBER and ITEM are getting involved as well. Meanwhile, the former Skill-Out member Shiage Hamazura is now working with ITEM. Learning about the recent incident, ITEM realizes SCHOOL's real goal and heads to the laboratory. SCHOOL's leader and Academy City's #2 Level 5 esper named Teitoku Kakine escapes with the device he stole. Elsewhere, GROUP learns BLOCK is planning to steal biological weapons from the city's virus vault, but Etzali reveals the vault is a decoy since their real target is a satellite control center of Hikoboshi II orbital laser weapon. Accelerator then heads to the satellite control center alone.
53	5	"Dark Matter"; Transliteration: "Dāku Matā" (Japanese: 未元物質(ダークマター))	Takashi Kobayashi	Ryunosuke Kingetsu	Kōjin Ochi	November 2, 2018
Kazari Uiharu accompanies a runaway Last Order. Upon arriving at the satellite control center, Accelerator faces off a teleporter of MEMBER named Saraku and manages to defeat him. Elsewhere, the MEMBER's leader named "Professor" confronts Teitoku but is killed instead. Meanwhile, BLOCK begins shutting down Academy City's surveillance system to allow the entry of mercenaries from outside, but Etzali alerts the drone helicopters to stop them. The remaining BLOCK members named Tatsuhiko Saku and Megumi Teshio proceed with their plan of killing Aleister Crowley by taking Awaki Musujime's imprisoned comrades hostage in exchange for teleporting them inside the Windowless Building. Arriving at the prison, Accelerator stays behind to stop the remaining mercenaries, while Etzali confronts a MEMBER agent and his colleague from the Aztec magic cabal named Xochitl, who planned to kill him for treason. Motoharu and Awaki confront Tatsuhiko and Megumi, who then kills her partner for endangering the hostages and decided to force Awaki in working with her instead. Awaki manages to defeat her after she overcame her trauma from self-teleporting. GROUP rescues the hostages and saves Xochitl's life. Meanwhile, Teitoku arrives at ITEM's hideout after he tortured Frenda Seivelun for their location.
54	6	"Super-espers"; Transliteration: "Chō Nōryoku-sha-tachi" (Japanese: 超能力者達)	Yoshiyuki Nogami	Ryunosuke Kingetsu	Yūichi Nihei	November 9, 2018
Shiage finds the ITEM's hideout being attacked by SCHOOL. Teitoku tries to kill Shiage but is stopped by Rikō Takitsubo with her ability activated by Body Crystal drugs. SCHOOL then leaves after they achieve their mission of disabling Rikō's power. A vengeful Shizuri Mugino orders Rikō to use her ability more. Shiage confiscates the drug and takes her to Aiho Yomikawa for safety. He then confronts Shizuri, who recently killed Frenda for betraying them. As Shizuri chases him, Shiage leads her to an abandoned building and manages to defeat her. Meanwhile, Teitoku tortures Kazari for Last Order's whereabouts when Accelerator arrives. He then reveals his hatred towards Aleister after he learned that the latter only considered him as a backup for the Level 6 Shift Project. Teitoku decides to kill Accelerator to prove his superiority, but the latter manages to defeat him. Aiho tries to stop Accelerator from killing Teitoku when she is stabbed by the latter, causing Accelerator to go berserk against him. Last Order arrives and manages to pacify Accelerator. Later, Motoharu discovers one dark side organization absent in today's chaos: "DRAGON".
55	7	"The Third Level"; Transliteration: "Dai San Kaisō" (Japanese: 第三階層)	Akihiro Izumi	Kenji Sugihara	Kiyoko Sayama	November 16, 2018
Itsuwa arrives in Academy City and tells Tōma of being assigned as his bodyguard to protect him from Acqua, who wants to kill him for ruining the plans of God's Right Seat. While her fellow Amakusa Catholics observe the two and plan to get them close, Mikoto passes by as she deals with the revelation of Tōma's memory loss. Tōma brings Itsuwa to his dormitory and later finds Index accidentally destroying their bathroom. Itsuwa decides to bring Tōma and Index to a spa located in an underground level of District 22. Mikoto goes to the spa as well and has an awkward meeting with Index and Itsuwa. Afterward, Tōma and Itsuwa go for a walk at a bridge when Acqua appears after the latter defeated the rest of Amakusa Catholics. Acqua demands Tōma to hand over his right hand containing the Imagine Breaker. Tōma and Itsuwa attempt to fight back but are unable to hit him due to his Saint powers. After he beat Tōma to a pulp, Acqua gives him one more day to give up his right hand, while Itsuwa feels guilty for failing her mission.
56	8	"Saint Breakout"; Transliteration: "Seijin Kuzushi" (Japanese: 聖人崩し)	Toshikazu Hashimoto	Kenji Sugihara	Toshikazu Hashimoto	November 23, 2018
Tōma is hospitalized, while Itsuwa is still depressed but becomes motivated to fight back after Saiji Tatemiya gave her a stern lecture. The Amakusa Catholics prepare their weapons for another fight against Acqua. They receive information from Orsola Aquinas about Acqua's past and abilities, making them prepared to confront him. The Amakusa Catholics cast a curse on Acqua, but it gets nullified by his Divine Mother ability. They then cast a spell known as "Saint Destroyer" designed specifically to defeat Saints like him. Itsuwa launches the spell with her lance, but the attack seemingly fails to work against Acqua. The Amakusa Catholics are quickly overwhelmed and defeated but are spared when Acqua sensed the presence of Kaori Kanzaki, another Saint. Acqua confronts Kaori, who vows to defeat him for the sake of her Amakusa comrades.
57	9	"Holy Mother Veneration"; Transliteration: "Seibo Sūhai" (Japanese: 聖母崇拝)	Kazuma Satō	Kenji Sugihara	Kiyotaka Ohata, Kōjin Ochi & Toshikazu Hashimoto	November 30, 2018
Tōma regains his consciousness and sneaks out of the hospital to aid the Amakusa Catholics' fight against Acqua. He runs into Mikoto on his way and has a deep conversation with her. Meanwhile, Acqua continues to overpower Kaori until the Amakusa Catholics join the battle to aid her. Kaori then discovers Acqua's weakness which could make Saint Destroyer work against him, while Itsuwa learns that he prepared a defensive spell to counter-attack it in their fight earlier. Acqua prepares to launch a powerful attack against the Amakusa Catholics, but Tōma arrives and manages to cancel it out with his right hand, creating an opening for them to defeat him. Back in Vatican City, the Pope becomes aware of Acqua's defeat and is soon approached by the leader of God's Right Seat named Fiamma of the Right. Fiamma reveals his disinterest in targeting Academy City and plans to capture Index to increase his power, even at the cost of plunging Europe into conflict. The Pope attempts to subdue him, but Fiamma defeats him with his Holy Right power. Fiamma then departs for England, while the injured Pope orders Vento to pursue him.
58	10	"Sky Bus 365"; Transliteration: "Sukai Basu Sanbyaku Roku-jū Go" (Japanese: スカイバス365)	Yūsuke Onoda	Takahiro Nagase	Hideaki Kurakawa	December 7, 2018
An explosion in Eurotunnel severely damages both the English and French economies, causing heightened tensions between both countries. The British royal family summons Index to determine the cause, with Tōma acting as her guardian. Their flight experience setbacks when Tōma learned about the boarding of a member of the French anti-English terrorist organization that planned to take out England's aerial supply routes. Tōma is detained to prevent him from causing panic among the passengers, while the terrorist sits beside Index to sabotage the plane's landing stabilizers near Tōma's seat and then takes her hostage. Luckily, he manages to hear Index's struggle and rescues her. Meanwhile, Necessarius becomes aware of the hijacking and casts spells to force the plane to make an emergency landing, but their efforts are thwarted by an unidentified third party. Back in the plane, Tōma subdues the terrorist and realizes that he waited for his accomplice to sneak inside the plane's cargo hold during their stopover. He heads down and with the help of Stiyl, who arrived on board a stealth jet under the orders of Necessarius, manages to neutralize the second terrorist.
59	11	"British Labyrinth"; Transliteration: "Igirisu Meiro" (Japanese: 英国迷路)	Yoshihiro Mori	Takahiro Nagase	Kiyoko Sayama	December 14, 2018
Tōma and Index arrive in Edinburgh and are taken by Kaori to Buckingham Palace to meet Queen Elizard, First Princess Riméa, Second Princess Carissa, Third Princess Villian, and the Knight Leader. He is introduced to Curtana Original, a sword with power equally aligned to Archangel Michael, and Curtana Second, a replacement currently wielded by Elizard after the original was lost. Elizard dispatches Index, the Knight Leader, Carissa, and Villian to Eurotunnel and instructs Necessarius to determine the true goal of the magic cabal called "New Light", who was revealed to be the cause of preventing the emergency landing earlier. Meanwhile, New Light members arrive with suitcases of an excavated artifact. Tōma and Oriana Thomson, who is currently working with Necessarius, pursue one of their members named Lessar. He soon learns about the suitcases being magically linked, allowing the artifact to teleport between them. Tōma saves Lessar from being assassinated by the Knights of England. Lessar then reveals the artifact is Curtana Original, and they are working for Carissa, who planned to use it in seizing control of the monarchy to set the stage for her invasion of France.
60	12	"Mercenary"; Transliteration: "Yōhei" (Japanese: 傭兵)	Yoshiyuki Nogami	Hiroyuki Yoshino	Kōjin Ochi	December 21, 2018
Carissa begins mobilizing the Knights of England. Smartvery and her fellow witches collide with the knights near the country's border. Agnese and her fellow battle nuns are confronted by other knights but manage to escape them. While in Eurotunnel, Index confirms the involvement of France magically in the explosion, justifying Carissa's decision to invade the country. Tōma, Oriana, and a wounded Lessar struggle to sneak past the knights until Sherry Cromwell attacks them. Meanwhile, Kaori arrives to defeat Carissa but is defeated by the Knight Leader. Carissa orders him to intercept Villian's carriage and behead her. Acqua rescues Villian and sends her to safety. With Oriana's direction, Tōma sneaks aboard a train that would lead him to Index's location and encounters an imprisoned member of New Light named Floris. He frees her by destroying the restraints with his Imagine Breaker, alerting the guards in the process, but they manage to jump off the train. Elsewhere, Acqua struggles with Knight Leader's vicious attacks due to the aftermath of his defeat in Academy City, while Elizard and Archbishop of Canterbury Lola Stuart free themselves from the knights but encounter trouble returning to London.
61	13	"Curtana Original"; Transliteration: "Katēna=Orijinaru" (Japanese: カーテナ = オリジナル)	Yuki Morita	Hiroyuki Yoshino	Kiyotaka Ohata & Kōhei Hatano	December 28, 2018
Tōma and Floris encounter Villian and are found by the Amakusa Catholics. He continues to find Index and spots Acqua, who recently defeated the Knight Leader, and her carriage. Carissa arrives and attacks them, but Acqua rescues the two and leaves them to Amakusa Catholics boarding the plane. Kaori and Saiji inform Tōma of their plan to overload Curtana Original using the special railway found in the subway under the Buckingham Palace and the witches' flying fortress called "Coven Compass". Later, Tōma, Index, and Villian walk through the tunnel when they encounter a Norse clay giant. They manage to destroy it and successfully carry out their mission. Saiji prepares a huge feast for everyone before they storm the palace. The Knight Leader contacts Acqua and discusses with him what would be the result of overloading the Curtana Original, while Elizard, Riméa, and Lola are about to reach London, with the Queen mentioning the readiness of the flag stored in the British Museum.
62	14	"Heroes"; Transliteration: "Eiyū-tachi" (Japanese: 英雄達)	Yūsuke Onoda & Shigeki Awai	Hiroyuki Yoshino	Takashi Watanabe & Kōjin Ochi	January 11, 2019
The witches at Coven Compass begin to launch an attack at Buckingham Palace, while Tōma's allies manage to reach the palace and fight Carissa, but they find themselves at a disadvantage. Meanwhile, Riméa watches them from afar and learns about Carissa's true plan of getting herself to be buried along with the Curtana artifacts once she destroys the United Kingdom's domestic and foreign enemies. She then orders the forces to save her. The Knight Leader and Acqua join Kaori in defeating Carissa, but they struggle with her Curtana Original. Elizard arrives with the Union Jack that would give the British citizens to fight back. Carissa is finally defeated and is punched by Tōma. She regains consciousness in an alley and finds Fiamma telling her about his involvement in the recent events Tōma rescues her and shockingly sees that Fiamma managed to obtain the John's Pen remote control to control Index. Fiamma then leaves for Russia.
63	15	"Spark Signal"; Transliteration: "Supāku Shigunaru" (Japanese: 迎電部隊(スパークシグナル))	Yoshihiro Mori & Akihiro Izumi	Tsuyoshi Tamai	Tomoyuki Kurokawa	January 18, 2019
GROUP is tasked to eliminate a group called "Spark Signal". Shiage visits Rikō and Saiai Kinuhata in a private room, with the latter informing him later about joining a new team that consisted of defunct members from ITEM, SCHOOL, BLOCK, and MEMBER. Accelerator saves a group of children held hostage by Spark Signal in an underground particle accelerator facility and becomes bothered with the terrorists' demand to disclose all information related to DRAGON. A member of Academy City's Board of Directors named Thomas Platinaburg orders a mercenary named Stephanie Gorgeouspalace to kill Accelerator but is killed by her instead for mentioning her friend Chimitsu as collateral damage. Shiokishi, also one of the Board of Directors, tasks GROUP to kill the rest of Spark Signal. Meanwhile, Saiai decides to eliminate Spark Signal by herself as per the new team's task, but she and Shiage are suddenly pursued by a six-winged helicopter. She manages to destroy it and leaves him behind during the destruction. Shiage then receives a call from the girl in the dress informing him about Spark Signal taking over the private room building where Rikō stayed.
64	16	"The Governing Board"; Transliteration: "Tōkatsu Riji-kai" (Japanese: 統括理事会)	Toshikazu Hashimoto	Tsuyoshi Tamai	Toshikazu Hashimoto	January 25, 2019
Shiage manages to reach the private room building via helicopter. Accelerator also arrives and subdues the Spark Signal when Shiokishi's bodyguard named Sugitani appears and kills the remaining operatives. He later finds Shiage and a weakened Rikō. Saiai arrives near the building but is suddenly attacked by Stephanie. GROUP learns that every team who wants to learn about DRAGON is eliminated when their mobile hideout is destroyed. Accelerator manages to escape paralyzed but a man who saved his beloved teacher earlier from Spark Signal helps him. Motoharu contacts Accelerator and instructs him to head to District 21 to seek help from Monaka. In an underground mall, Shiage and Rikō find Saiai being attacked by Stephanie. GROUP arrives at Shiokishi's hideout, with Etzali disguising as Monaka. Accelerator and Awaki get separated from him and encounter Sugitani, while Etzali meets up with Shiokishi. He demands to stop eliminating others and asks about DRAGON, but Shiokishi gives no details of it. Etzali reveals himself, prompting Shiokishi to task his two bodyguards to kill him but only finding them dead and being replaced by Etzali's colleague at his Aztec magic cabal named Tecpatl and Tochtli.
65	17	"DRAGON"; Transliteration: "Doragon" (Japanese: 怪物(ドラゴン))	Masahiro Shinohara	Tsuyoshi Tamai	Masahiro Shinohara	February 1, 2019
While Awaki is unconscious, Accelerator faces off Sugitani and manages to defeat him despite being paralyzed. Etzali continues fighting Tecpatl wielding an original grimoire based on the Aztec calendar until he finally kills him. Meanwhile, Saiai manages to defeat Stephanie despite the lack of nitrogen supply for her ability in the area. She warns Shiage to flee since he is the real target and gets captured by operatives led by the girl in the dress, who revealed about the manhunt on Shiage due to being a threat to Aleister's plan. GROUP interrogates a dying Shiokishi about DRAGON when they lose consciousness, except Accelerator, after the angel named Aiwass manifested in front of them. Accelerator is defeated by Aiwass in their fight and is informed by the angel to head to Russia to find Index who would be able to remove the virus in Last Order. Meanwhile, Shiage and Rikō are saved from pursuing soldiers by Shizuri, who appeared to be alive. He defeats Shizuri for the second time and pilots a supersonic jet to escape Academy City with Rikō. Meanwhile, Tōma arrives in Russia.
66	18	"The Alliance of Independent Nations"; Transliteration: "Dokuritsu Gokudōmei" (Japanese: 独立国同盟)	Yoshihiro Mori	Ryunosuke Kingetsu	Shingo Yuki	February 8, 2019
The Russian government declares war on Academy City. In Russia, Shiage and Rikō arrive as the latter's health worsens, while Accelerator and Last Order board a train and encounter three unknown high-powered soldiers with a briefcase. Tōma is followed by Lessar, who attempts to seduce him to get him on the United Kingdom's side. Meanwhile, a fleet boarded by Kaori and the Agnese Forces is attacked by French magicians, but Carissa and the Knight Leader counterattack them. Tōma and Lessar infiltrate Fiamma's base and learn about his plan of capturing Sasha Kreutzev in the Elizalina Alliance of Independent Nations. The two later arrive at the country and meet its ruler named Elizalina. Fiamma also arrives and attacks them, luring out Sasha in the process. Vento shows up to capture Fiamma for causing the Roman Catholic Church trouble. As Accelerator and Last Order arrive in a destroyed military base with the parchment he retrieved from the three soldiers earlier, a masked woman boarding a plane observes them.
67	19	"Misaka Worst"; Transliteration: "Misaka Wāsuto" (Japanese: 番外個体(ミサカワースト))	Masato Miyoshi & Shigeki Awai	Ryunosuke Kingetsu	Kōjin Ochi	February 15, 2019
The masked woman confronts Accelerator and introduces herself as Misaka Worst. Meanwhile, Vento summons an ice ship from Biagio's Queen Fleet to attack Fiamma but is defeated instead. Fiamma reveals being consciously connected with Index, who currently rests in London, and mocks Tōma for lying about his memory loss in front of her. He then leaves them with an unconscious Sasha. In a village near the border of the Elizalina Alliance of Independent Nations, Rikō is being taken care of by the local doctor in exchange for Shiage's car battery to be used as their source of electricity. Suddenly, Russian military privateers arrive and start to bomb the place. Meanwhile, a terrified Accelerator runs away from Misaka Worst and is unable to fight back due to his promise of not hurting Misaka clones anymore. In the end, he decides to retaliate when she threatened to kill Last Order and brutally beats her. This causes Accelerator to recall the time he killed the 10,000 Misaka clones and become traumatized by his actions. He promises to make those responsible for their predicament pay.
68	20	"A Reason to Protect"; Transliteration: "Mamoru Riyū" (Japanese: 守る理由)	Yoshiyuki Nogami	Ryunosuke Kingetsu	Takashi Watanabe	February 22, 2019
Accelerator stops Misaka Worst from bleeding as he becomes mentally unstable, while Tōma and Lessar leave the Elizalina Alliance of Independent Nations. Meanwhile, Shiage helps the villagers to fight back the military privateers when he receives unexpected help from Acqua. Elsewhere, Carissa and her British forces continue fighting the French forces when their leader named The Maiden of Versailles arrives. Tōma and Lessar come across Accelerator. Tōma defeats him after he snaps him out of his instability and helps Last Order using his Imagine Breaker. Meanwhile, Carissa mentions to The Maiden of Versailles about the Russian defense manual involving the release of an airborne biological weapon to their nuclear launch facilities called "Kremlin Report". Back in Academy City, Mikoto and Kuroko find an online news report clip that showed Tōma in the background, prompting her to go after him. Back in Russia, Accelerator is sent to the Elizalina Alliance of Independent Nations with Last Order and a note that contained the words "Index Librorum Prohibitorum". Meanwhile, Fiamma prepares Sasha for the summoning of the Star of Bethlehem.
69	21	"The Star of B'Tselem"; Transliteration: "Betsurehemu no Hoshi" (Japanese: ベツレヘムの星)	Yoshihiro Mori & Kouzou Kaihou	Tsuyoshi Tamai	Yūichi Nihei	March 1, 2019
Vasilisa contacts the Pope to discuss their plan of dealing with the current war. Aiwass instructs Hyōka Kazakiri to stop Archangel Gabriel in Russia. Acqua and Shiage manage to free the villagers from the military privateers. He then retreats as Academy City forces close in to secure the village. Shiage and Rikō are being pursued by an Academy City-powered suit but are saved by Accelerator after they reached the Elizalina Alliance of Independent Nations. The trio meets Elizalina, who manages to cure Rikō but not Last Order due to the virus inside her being able to regenerate after being removed. Accelerator decides to seek cooperation with Misaka Worst to find ways to cure Last Order. Back in London, Stiyl confronts Lola for putting Index under her control with her backup remote control. Meanwhile, Fiamma summons a large flying fortress called "Star of Bethlehem" and calls upon Archangel Gabriel. During that time, Mikoto arrives but her plane is destroyed by the archangel. She safely lands on the ground and meets Misaka #10777.
70	22	"Angel Power (Gabriel)"; Transliteration: "Tenshi no Chikara (Gaburieru)" (Japanese: 天使の力(ガブリエル))	Yūsuke Onoda	Tsuyoshi Tamai	Shingo Yuki & Hiroshi Nishikiori	March 8, 2019
Tōma bumps into Sasha at the Star of Bethlehem, while Fiamma orders Archangel Gabriel to retrieve the parchment to complete his plan. Shiage and Rikō find the Kremlin Report and learn that it would be used in the village. Tōma is confused to see Sasha separated from Archangel Gabriel unlike during the Angel Fall incident. The rioting Vaticanians are pacified by the Pope, while Cardinal Pietro Yogdis plans to continue the papal conclave to secure his promotion as the new Pope. The Pope reassures Pietro he will be elected as the new leader of the Roman Catholic Church and only wants his permission to access the Vatican Library to find a way to counter Fiamma's plan. Carissa works with The Maiden of Versailles to defeat Archangel Gabriel and orders a surface-to-air missile attack towards the flying fortress, prompting the archangel to retreat. Archangel Gabriel finds Tōma and Sasha riding a monorail and is about to attack them when Hyōka saves them. Meanwhile, Misaka #10777 intercepts a Russian transmission ordering the launch of a nuclear warhead towards the flying fortress.
71	23	"Fuse=Kazakiri"; Transliteration: "Hyūzu=Kazakiri" (Japanese: ヒューズ = カザキリ)	Shigeki Awai	Tsuyoshi Tamai	Kōjin Ochi, Kouzou Kaihou & Hiroshi Nishikiori	March 15, 2019
Back in London, Stiyl struggles to restrain Index while in her John's Pen mode. Elsewhere, Archangel Gabriel and Hyōka continue fighting until the archangel detects the parchment being possessed by Accelerator. Accelerator decides to leave Last Order with Misaka Worst and fights the archangel, while Shiage and Rikō inform the villagers about the Kremlin Report. Meanwhile, Acqua joins the battle against Archangel Gabriel and uses his authority as a member of God's Right Seat to draw much of his Thelema to restrain her. Tōma destroys portions of the Star of Bethlehem with his Imagine Breaker to disrupt the archangel's power. Accelerator manages to defeat Archangel Gabriel with Hyōka's help, while a wounded Acqua is found by Shiage and Rikō. Fiamma gains knowledge of the parchment and personally confronts Tōma. Shiage and Rikō arrive at a missile launch facility and receive help from Academy City after they learned about the Kremlin Report. He survives the bombardment of the place conducted by their bomber plane and finds Rikō missing.
72	24	"List of Prohibited Books (Index)"; Transliteration: "Indekkusu" (Japanese: 禁書目録(インデックス))	Yoshiyuki Nogami & Kentarō Suzuki	Hiroyuki Yoshino	Kentarō Suzuki	March 22, 2019
Hyōka informs Accelerator about the song that Index sang to Last Order during Vento of the Front's attack in Academy City as a method of removing the virus. Shiage continues looking for Rikō but finds Shizuri instead. Shizuri then takes all of the Body Crystal drugs and goes berserk until her body collapses due to overdose. Shiage convinces her to change and reconciles with her. At the Star of Bethlehem, Fiamma attacks Tōma with the combined knowledge of Index's grimoires and his position as a member of God's Right Seat. He reveals his desire to restore the world before humanity started to destroy it, but Tōma rebuffs his goal since he only wants to force everyone to do his will. Fiamma manages to detach Tōma's right arm but later finds him regrowing the missing limb.
73	25	"Wings"; Transliteration: "Tsubasa" (Japanese: 翼)	Yoshihiro Mori	Hiroyuki Yoshino	Shingo Yuki & Hiroshi Kawashima	March 29, 2019
Shiage and Shizuri manage to find Rikō when they notice three powered suits dropping off from an Academy City's plane, but they manage to defeat them. Elsewhere, Accelerator obtains the data of Index's song retrieved by Misaka Worst through the Misaka Network and begins to sing it. As he continues to fight Tōma at the Star of Bethlehem, Fiamma summons gigantic golden arms around the world. The leader of the Dawn-colored Sunlight magic cabal named Leivinia Birdway destroys one of them and convinces the countries involved in the war to join forces in defeating those. In Moscow, Vasilisa defeats Fiamma's accomplice within the Russian Orthodox Church named Nikolai Tolstoy and frees the imprisoned Patriarch named Krans R. Tsarskiy. She advises him to work with the Roman Catholic Church and the Church of England to release the spell that held the flying fortress together. Lessar informs Tōma to escape the place as it is about to descend, but Fiamma mentions the accumulated Thelema that would come down to Earth with it will wipe out civilization.
74	26	"Son of God"; Transliteration: "Kami no Ko" (Japanese: 神の子)	Katsushi Sakurabi & Yoshiyuki Nogami	Hiroyuki Yoshino	Hiroshi Nishikiori & Katsushi Sakurabi	April 5, 2019
Accelerator saves Last Order despite suffering heavy injuries from using magic. Meanwhile, Tōma defeats Fiamma and decides to let him escape. He encounters Mikoto and Misaka #10777 arriving to rescue him but declines them to deal with the Star of Bethlehem's descend. Tōma then encounters Index in her John Pen's mode and apologizes for keeping his memory loss a secret to her. Stiyl contacts Tōma and instructs him to destroy the elevating magical items found in the flying fortress. Archangel Gabriel arrives but is defeated by Tōma as they plunge into the Arctic Ocean. ITEM encounters soldiers led by their liaison, who wanted to retrieve Rikō due to her potential of becoming the #8 Level 5 esper, but they are saved by the villagers. Shiage and Accelerator negotiate for their safe return to Academy City. Elsewhere, Fiamma lands on the ground but is heavily injured by Aleister for learning about Imagine Breaker. He is later found by Ollerus and Silvia. At a press conference, Krans announces the end of hostilities between Russia and Academy City. Meanwhile, Leivinia and her assistant find an unconscious Tōma floating.

== Cast and characters ==
=== Main ===
- Atsushi Abe as Toma Kamijo
- Yuka Iguchi as Index
- Rina Satō as Mikoto Misaka
- Nobuhiko Okamoto as Accelerator
- Satoshi Hino as Shiage Hamazura

=== Recurring ===
- Satomi Arai as Kuroko Shirai
- Anri Katsu as Motoharu Tsuchimikado
- Yūko Kaida as Aiho Yomikawa
- Ai Kayano as Itsuwa
- Kishō Taniyama as Stiyl Magnus
- Rie Kugimiya as Agnese Sanctis
- Hiroki Tōchi as Acqua of the Back
- Masafumi Kimura as Matthai Reese
- Harumi Sakurai as Awaki Musujime
- Daisuke Kishio as Mitsuki Unabara
- Ami Koshimizu as Shizuri Mugino
- Chinatsu Akasaki as Saiai Kinuhata
- Aya Suzaki as Rikō Takitsubo
- Rina Hidaka as Last Order
- Shiori Izawa as Kaibi Gokusai (Note: Credited as "Girl in the Dress")
- Kohsuke Toriumi as Saiji Tatemiya
- Masaki Nakanishi as Ushibuka
- Takeru Kikuchi as Kōyagi
- Hinata Tadokoro as Nomozaki
- Kōichi Sōma as Isahaya
- Eri Yukimura as Tsushima
- Shizuka Itō as Kaori Kanzaki
- Akeno Watanabe as Sherry Cromwell
- Ayako Kawasumi as Laura Stuart
- Akiko Hiramatsu as Vento of the Front
- Toshiyuki Morikawa as Fiamma of the Right
- Takehito Koyasu as the Knight Leader
- Sayaka Harada as Villian
- Yūki Takada as Lessar
- Minori Suzuki as Floris
- Kei Shindō as Carrisa
- Yoko Soumi as Elizard
- Kana Asumi as Hyōka Kazakiri
- Mitsuru Miyamoto as Aiwass
- Itaru Yamamoto as Dirguv
- Naomi Shindō as Elizalina
- Ai Kakuma as Misaka Worst
- Yuka Keichō as The Maiden of Versailles
- Nozomi Sasaki as Misaka 10777
- Yuka Terasaki as Sasha Kreutzev

== Production ==
=== Development ===
Kazuma Miki, the light novel editor, apologized to fans who attended the Dengeki Bunko Autumn Festival 2015 in October for not having a sequel to A Certain Magical Index II "yet". He teased a possible third season in April 2016 and later asked fans to "wait a little longer" for its release. At the Dengeki Bunko Autumn Festival 2017 in October, Miki confirmed the production of A Certain Magical Index III as part of several projects under "A Certain Project 2018". In June 2018, J.C.Staff was confirmed to be producing the series, while Hiroshi Nishikiori and Yuichi Tanaka returned from the previous two seasons as the director and character animation designer, respectively. Hiroyuki Yoshino, who scripted A Certain Magical Index: The Movie – The Miracle of Endymion, was confirmed to be the series composition writer, replacing Masanao Akahoshi. Additional staff members from A Certain Magical Index and A Certain Scientific Railgun anime series were confirmed in August 2018 to be returning for the third season.

=== Writing ===
Kazuma Kamachi, creator of Index franchise, revealed that there were initial talks to make the third sequel a reboot of the series. Miki said that the production committee decided in the end to adapt the remaining volumes for the new season since fans wanted the whole story to be completed. The third season adapted the fourteenth to the twenty-second volume of the light novel.

=== Casting ===
Atsushi Abe and Yuka Iguchi confirmed in October 2017 their return for the third season as Toma Kamijo and Index, respectively. In June 2018, Rina Satō, Nobuhiko Okamoto, and Satoshi Hino were confirmed to be returning as Mikoto Misaka, Accelerator, and Shiage Hamazura, respectively. Additional cast members were announced in September 2018, including Yoko Soumi as Elizard, Kei Shindou as Carissa, Sayaka Harada as Villian, Takehito Koyasu as the Knight Leader, and Toshiyuki Morikawa as Fiamma of the Right.

=== Music ===
Maiko Iuchi of I've Sound was confirmed in July 2018 to be returning from the previous two seasons to compose the series. Maon Kurosaki performed the first opening theme music titled "Gravitation", while Iguchi performed the first ending theme music titled "Eve of a Revolution" (革命前夜, Kakumei Zenya), which were used from episodes 1 to 15. Kurosaki also performed the second opening theme music titled "Roar", while Iguchi also performed the second ending theme music titled "The Never-Ending Song" (終わらない歌, Owaranai Uta), which were used from episode 16 onwards.

== Marketing ==
A teaser trailer for A Certain Magical Index III was released at Anime Expo 2018 in July, while a promotional trailer was released at the 94th Comiket in August. The cast attended a stage event for the series at Kyoto International Manga Anime Fair 2018 in September. A commercial video was released on the series' official website in October 2018.

== Release ==
=== Broadcast ===
A Certain Magical Index III began airing in Japan on AT-X on October 5, 2018, on Tokyo MX and BS11 on October 6, and on MBS on October 7. Muse Communication began airing the series in Taiwan on i-Fun Anime Channel on October 7, 2018.

=== Home media ===
Japanese Blu-ray & DVD release
Vol.	Episodes	Release date	Ref.
1	1–3	December 26, 2018	
2	4–6	January 30, 2019	
3	7–9	February 28, 2019	
4	10–12	March 27, 2019	
5	13–16	April 30, 2019	
6	17–19	May 30, 2019	
7	20–22	June 26, 2019	
8	23–26	July 31, 2019	

NBCUniversal Entertainment Japan released eight Blu-ray and DVD volumes of A Certain Magical Index III starting December 26, 2018. Each volume contains a bonus novel written by Kamachi titled A Certain Scientific Railgun SS3. The first and fifth limited-edition volumes are bundled with episodes 6 and 7 of the bonus anime A Certain Magical Index-tan. A 7-disc Blu-ray box was released on September 29, 2021. Funimation released the first combo set in North America on October 1, 2019, and the second combo set on January 7, 2020. Crunchyroll released the season on Blu-ray in North America on February 4, 2025, and in the United Kingdom on March 24.

In October 2018, Funimation announced their simulcasting and dubbing of the season, while Crunchyroll began simulcasting it outside Asia. Muse Communication started distributing the full season on their Muse Asia YouTube channel on August 21, 2019. Hulu released the season in Japan on March 24, 2022.

== Reception ==
Theron Martin of Anime News Network graded A Certain Magical Index III 'B−', stating that it was "problematic" and being mishandled as compared to A Certain Scientific Accelerator (2019) and A Certain Scientific Railgun T (2020). He also noted its pacing and complicated story arcs but praised its delivery of "what has always made the franchise entertaining". The series received heavy criticism from fans due to its "paltry" run and "wonky pacing", prompting them to send Nishikiori their hate messages.
