= A Certain Magical Index season 1 =

2008 Japanese television season

A Certain Magical Index
- Season 1
- First home media volume cover, featuring Index (L) and Toma Kamijo (R)
- Starring: Atsushi Abe; Yuka Iguchi; Rina Satō; Shizuka Itō; Kishō Taniyama; Anri Katsu; Kimiko Koyama; Satomi Arai; Nobuhiko Okamoto
- No. of episodes: 24

Release
- Original network: Chiba TV (#1–13); AT-X (#14–24)
- Original release: October 5, 2008 – March 19, 2009

Season chronology
- Next → Season 2

The first season of the Japanese animated television series A Certain Magical Index, based on the light novel series of the same name written by Kazuma Kamachi and illustrated by Kiyotaka Haimura, follows the first meeting between Toma Kamijo, a high school student in the scientific-advanced Academy City whose right hand contains a unique power, and Index, a young nun from the Church of England whose mind has been implanted with 103,000 grimoires of the Index Librorum Prohibitorum. Produced by J.C.Staff, the season saw Hiroshi Nishikiori and Masanao Akahoshi respectively serving as director and series composition writer.

Atsushi Abe, Yuka Iguchi, Rina Satō, and Satomi Arai reprise their audio drama roles and are joined by voice cast members Shizuka Itō, Kishō Taniyama, Anri Katsu, Kimiko Koyama, and Nobuhiko Okamoto. The anime adaptation of the light novels was confirmed in June 2008 and adapts its first six volumes.

The first season consists of 24 episodes and ran on Chiba TV and AT-X from October 5, 2008, to March 19, 2009, with several other networks following hours or days later. (Note: Chiba TV lists the series premiere as airing on October 4 at 25:30, which is effectively October 5 at 1:35 a.m. JST) A second season was announced in June 2010.

== Episodes ==
No. overall	No. in season	Title	Directed by	Written by	Storyboarded by	Original release date
1	1	"Academy City"; Transliteration: "Gakuen-toshi" (Japanese: 学園都市)	Hiroshi Nishikiori	Masanao Akahoshi	Hiroshi Nishikiori	October 5, 2008
Tōma Kamijō, a Level 0 student living in Academy City, has a unique ability capable of nullifying psychic, magical, and divine powers, yet negating his good luck in the process. After intruding on a confrontation, he survives a reluctant duel against Mikoto Misaka, a powerful Level 5 esper capable of controlling and generating electricity, resulting in her causing a citywide blackout. The following morning, Tōma finds a young nun from the Church of England hanging off his balcony. She introduces herself as Index and reveals being chased by magicians due to the possession of 103,000 grimoires. Index tries to explain the existence of magic and Tōma proves the power of his right hand by touching her magical habit, destroying it in the process. After their meeting, the two go their separate ways, but after returning home from a remedial class, Tōma finds a bleeding Index on the ground in front of his door and encounters a red-haired magician.
2	2	"Innocentius (The Witch Hunter King)"; Transliteration: "Inokentiusu (Majokari no Ō)" (Japanese: 魔女狩りの王(イノケンティウス))	Katsushi Sakurabi	Masanao Akahoshi	Satoshi Iwataki	October 12, 2008
The magician introduces himself as Stiyl Magnus and explains that his partner named Kaori Kanzaki unintentionally hurt Index, believing that the latter's habit would protect her from attacks. He explains to Tōma his mission to retrieve Index due to her photographic memory of 103,000 grimoires of the Index Librorum Prohibitorum. An enraged Tōma attacks Stiyl but the latter responds by using fire magic. Tōma's hand nullifies his spell attack, causing Stiyl to summon a fire monster called Innocentius in retaliation. As Tōma finds himself unable to negate the creature, Index switches to her self-protection system personality called "John's Pen" to reveal to him the runes placed around the building as the source of Innocentius' power. Tōma sets off sprinklers to erode the runes, extinguishing Innocentius in the process. After defeating Stiyl, Tōma brings Index to his teacher, Komoe Tsukuyomi, who is a non-esper and thus able to help in treating her wounds by using magic without any repercussions.
3	3	"Necessarius (The Church of Necessary Evil)"; Transliteration: "Nesesariusu (Hitsuyō Aku no Kyōkai)" (Japanese: 必要悪の教会(ネセサリウス))	Hideki Tachibana	Masanao Akahoshi	Hideki Tachibana	October 19, 2008
Komoe successfully assists Index in her ancient magic ritual to heal her wounds. The following morning, she questions Tōma about his relationship with Index, but eventually leaves the two alone. Tōma learns from Index about her religious organization called "Necessarius" and how they implanted the grimoires into her ememory to make her a living library for the Church, due to the fact that reading the original magical texts will curse and taint people. Meanwhile, Stiyl and Kaori continue to observe Index from a distance and comment her happiness will be short-lived. As the two head out to a sentō, Tōma finds himself separated from Index and encounters a girl wielding a nodachi on a suddenly empty street, who reveals herself as Kaori.
4	4	"Perfect Memory Ability"; Transliteration: "Kanzen Kioku Nōryoku" (Japanese: 完全記憶能力)	Kōsuke Kobayashi	Masanao Akahoshi	Noriyuki Nakamura & Hiroshi Nishikiori	October 26, 2008
Tōma refuses to hand Index over to Kaori despite her attacks. Kaori admits to being a fellow member of Necessarius and Index's friend. She clarifies that hurting Index in the process of "securing" her was not her intention, and that she was unaware that Index's habit had been rendered useless. She then explains that Index's brain contains eighty-five percent of the entire Index Librorum Prohibitorum, and the remaining fifteen percent needs to be annually erased to avoid any strain with any unnecessary memories, giving them three days from now before the annual limit is reached. She says that she and Stiyl had tried everything in the past to restore Index's memories but it eventually became unbearable to see her smile with each successive failure. Tōma criticizes Kaori for not considering Index's feelings and hiding this from her. After being severely injured by Kaori, Tōma wakes up three days later in Komoe's apartment under the care of Index. When Stiyl and Kaori arrive at the door, she promises to do as they ask in order to protect Tōma.
5	5	"Limit (12 o'clock)" Transliteration: "Rimitto (Jūni-toki)" (Japanese: 十二時(リミット))	Shinya Kawatsura	Masanao Akahoshi	Tetsuya Yanagisawa	November 2, 2008
Stiyl and Kaori warn Tōma that they will return at midnight to erase Index's memories, and take their leave. In pain, Index falls asleep, and Tōma attempts to find another way to save her using researchers' or espers' abilities, but ultimately remains helpless as the magicians arrive that night to prepare the spell. Stiyl admits Tōma's right hand has the power to stop them, but says he is taking her memory in order to save her life, and points out that Index will instead die if Tōma's proposed methods fail. The magicians leave Tōma alone with Index to say his farewell, but Tōma suddenly becomes suspicious of Kaori's statement about Index's precise memory capacity. Komoe confirms on the phone that humans cannot suffer or die from being exposed to too much information, and realizes that the Church made it so that Index's memory must be regularly erased as a means of ensuring her loyalty, and tricked Stiyl and Kaori. Tōma finds and dispels a magical rune in Index's throat with his ability, causing her to activate her "John's Pen" mode. Unable to analyze and devise a means of countering the Imagine Breaker, Index activates a spell called "St. George's Sanctuary" as an effective means to eliminate Tōma.
6	6	"Imagine Breaker"; Transliteration: "Imajin Bureikā" (Japanese: 幻想殺し(イマジンブレイカー))	Kei Umabiki	Masanao Akahoshi	Hiroshi Nishikiori	November 9, 2008
Tōma makes Stiyl and Kaori realize how Necessarius lied to them about Index's condition and how the rune responsible for her pain needs to be destroyed in order to allow her to live a normal life. As Index's "John's Pen" mode attacks the trio, she falls into a supine position, and a beam of light emanating from her known as "Dragon Breath" blasts a hole through the roof, destroying a satellite. With the magicians' help, Tōma manages to deactivate St. George's Sanctuary, saving Index in the process, but he is rendered unconscious when a feather from the spell touches his head. At the hospital, Index learns that Necessarius has decided to leave her alone for the time being due to Stiyl and Kaori questioning the Church's reasons for lying to them. She also learns that Tōma's brain cells and thus memories of his entire life have been destroyed after the events of the previous night. When Index enters his hospital room, Tōma is unable to recognize her, but after seeing her start to cry, brushes it off as a joke and says that he simply canceled the spell with his right hand's ability, called Imagine Breaker. After Index leaves, Tōma reaffirms the doctor that he in fact did lose his memories, and lied to avoid upsetting Index. Two weeks later, Stiyl meets Aleister Crowley, the ruler of Academy City, and to keep the status quo of non-interference between science and magic, the latter lends Tōma to him for an assignment to rescue someone capable of killing vampires called "Deep Blood" from a magician in the city.
7	7	"The Science Cult (Misawa Cram School)"; Transliteration: "Kagaku Sūhai (Misawa Juku)" (Japanese: 三沢塾(かがくすうはい))	Kazuo Tomizawa	Akira Tanizaki	Satoshi Kuwabara & Hiroshi Nishikiori	November 16, 2008
Tōma continues to keep his memory loss a secret and inadvertently upsets Index when he met with his two friends named Motoharu Tsuchimikado and Aogami Pierce, who both inadvertently insulted her. They went to a fast-food restaurant and Index goes into an argument with a girl dressed in miko, who introduced herself as a magician. The girl leaves before Index can learn about the magical organization she belonged to. On the way home, Index finds an abandoned cat and names it as Sphinx. She then chases it and runs into Stiyl, who mentioned needing Tōma to rescue "Deep Blood" named Aisa Himegami from Aureolus Izzard, an alchemist leading a secret science-worshiping cult at the Misawa Cram School. Tōma refuses to help, causing Stiyl to coerce him with threats about Necessarius taking Index away. When they arrived at the cram school, Tōma is surprised to learn "Deep Blood" is the girl he met earlier and finds a corpse in a suit of armor.
8	8	"Ars Magna (Golden Transmutation)"; Transliteration: "Arusu = Maguna (Kogane Rensei)" (Japanese: 黄金錬成(アルス = マグナ))	Noriyuki Fukuda	Masanao Akahoshi	Tetsuya Yanagisawa	November 23, 2008
Stiyl explains the dead knight is from the Thirteen Knights of the Roman Catholic Church and a magical barrier is concealing all magical occurrences inside Misawa Cram School from the public. He and Tōma are forced to separate when mind-controlled students cast an imitation of the Gregorian choir spell against them. Stiyl later finds Aureolus, while Tōma runs into Aisa, who revealed that she approached Aureolus because he has agreed to help her in curing her power that had caused people to turn into vampires if she uses her blood to lure them. Aisa then confronts Aurelous about his objectives and threatens to leave him if he continues to kill people. However, Aureolus seals Tōma and Stiyl's memories, causing the two to awaken outside the school without any recollection of their mission until Tōma uses his Imagine Breaker to nullify the spell. Meanwhile, Index has followed Stiyl's mana trail to the school and gets captured by Aureolus. The remaining knights attack the school with a true version of the Gregorian choir but it is restored by Aureolus's true power called "Ars Magna". Tōma finds Sphinx outside with Index's habit and realizes she is currently inside the school.
9	9	"Deep Blood (Vampire Killer)"; Transliteration: "Dīpu Buraddo (Kyūketsu Koroshi)" (Japanese: 吸血殺し(ディープブラッド))	Tamaki Nakatsu	Seishi Minakami	Tamaki Nakatsu	November 30, 2008
Tōma and Stiyl find Aureolus at his office, along with Aisa and an unconscious Index. It is revealed that Aureolus was Index's partner three years ago and became devastated about the need to erase her memories annually. He intends to use Ars Magna, along with Aisa's power, to turn Index into a vampire to overcome her one-year life expectancy. However, Aureolus becomes distraught when he learned Tōma already saved Index by using his ability, causing him to use his power against Tōma, Stiyl, and Aisa. He finds his reality-distorting magic useless against the Imagine Breaker. Tōma manipulates him into fearing him when he realized Ars Magna is incapable of altering reality and Aureolous' thoughts make come into it, ending in his severed right arm changing into a dragon and Aureolus passing out from fright. After the battle, Tōma is confined in the hospital to have his right arm be reattached. Stiyl visits him and explains that Aureolus lost his memories and power. He disappears when Index and Aisa came to visit, with Index revealing about the Church taking Aisa under their protection. Aisa smiles after he learned about Tōma's reason for saving her life.
10	10	"Mikoto Misaka (Sissy)"; Transliteration: "Misaka Mikoto (Onē-sama)" (Japanese: お姉様(みさかみこと))	Hideki Tachibana	Satoru Nishizono	Hideki Tachibana	December 7, 2008
A girl resembling Mikoto and wearing military goggles uses a sniper rifle to shoot a teenager named Accelerator, only for the shots to be reflected and her to wind up face-to-face against him. Tōma runs into Mikoto at a vending machine and they are caught off guard by her kōhai named Kuroko Shirai. After Kuroko teleported away, the two encounter another girl that looked exactly like Mikoto, who identified herself as her younger sister and referred to herself as Misaka. A frustrated Mikoto leads Misaka away despite the latter's objections, though Misaka approaches Tōma later that day and helps him carry tin cans. At a summer class the next day, Tōma, Motoharu, and Aogami learn that Mikoto became the third most powerful esper in Academy City, from Level 1 to 5, through hard work and effort, while Mikoto later tells Tōma her dislike of Tree Diagram, a powerful supercomputer launched on a space satellite to monitor the city. Tōma later runs into Misaka, who wanted to care for the abandoned black cat she found. As Tōma leaves her to find books about cats, Misaka senses Accelerator nearby and a fight ensues in a back alley.
11	11	"Sisters"; Transliteration: "Shisutāzu" (Japanese: 妹達(シスターズ))	Hiroshi Tsuruta	Satoru Nishizono	Tetsuya Yanagisawa	December 14, 2008
Accelerator kills Misaka using his ability to manipulate vectors. Tōma finds her dead body in the dark alley and calls the city's police force called "Anti-Skill", but they find the body missing. A confused Tōma continues to search the alley and becomes relieved to find Misaka alive but horrified to see her carrying a body bag that contained the corpse he had seen earlier. Dozens of identical girls show up and reveal to be clones of Mikoto, calling themselves "Sisters", with the one who carried the body bag introducing herself as Misaka #10032. Tōma goes to see Mikoto at her dormitory to learn the truth behind them. However, he ends up waiting with Kuroko, who turned out to be Mikoto's roommate, and is forced to hide under Mikoto's bed when the Tokiwadai Dorm Supervisor came by for an inspection. Tōma finds a report about Tree Diagram's calculated methods to make Accelerator, the most powerful Level 5 esper in Academy City, evolve into Level 6 by fighting the Sisters at special battlefields to gain experience from combat. He becomes aware of the truth and goes to confront Mikoto.
12	12	"Level 6 (Absolute Ability)"; Transliteration: "Reberu Shikkusu (Zettai Nōryoku)" (Japanese: 絶対能力(レベル6))	Shigeru Ueda	Satoru Nishizono	Hiroshi Nishikiori	December 21, 2008
Komoe demonstrates to Index and Aisa the extrasensory perception based on Schrödinger's theory. In the past, Mikoto had attracted a group of doctors who mentioned her ability may help people with muscular dystrophy, only to learn later about her DNA being used to create clones for military use, and was horrified to witness how her Sisters were used to fight Accelerator. Tōma confronts Mikoto about the experiment in which 20,000 clones of her would be used to fight against Accelerator in specific locations to advance him to Level 6. Mikoto feels helpless for being unable to stop the experiment since research centers will be created after each one she destroys. She believes sacrificing herself is the best solution to save the Sisters because the researchers no longer have the Tree Diagram (after it got destroyed by an off-course beam attack from Index) to recalculate the values for the experiment. As Tōma tries to talk her way out of considering death as her only option, a frustrated Mikoto electrifies him multiple times. Tōma is somehow able to get up each time, eventually moving Mikoto to tears. He passes out while trying to think of alternatives toward ending the experiment.
13	13	"Accelerator (One Way)"; Transliteration: "Akuserarēta (Ippōtsūkō)" (Japanese: 一方通行(アクセラレータ))	Daisuke Takashima	Satoru Nishizono	Masahiko Komino	December 28, 2008
Misaka #10032 arrives at a goods station, where she began to prepare for the upcoming battle against Accelerator, and wonders why she thought of Tōma during this time. At a bathhouse, Komoe continues explaining to Index and Aisa how espers acquired their powers by separating them from proper reality and making their reality and about Academy City's purpose to facilitate this process, though Level 0s like Tōma indicate the process has not yet been perfected. Tōma regains consciousness and tells Mikoto he, the weakest esper, will defeat Accelerator, the strongest one, to prove the experiment's underlying purpose wrong, thus ending the experiment. Mikoto attempts to make him reconsider, mainly due to his injuries, but Tōma leaves her behind. Meanwhile, Accelerator quickly defeats Misaka #10032 and is about to kill her when Tōma arrived to save her, much to her confusion over his decision to interfere. Accelerator overpowers Tōma but he becomes shocked and enraged when his ability got canceled by his right hand. Their fight causes several containers to release huge quantities of flour into the air, forcing Tōma to run as Accelerator sets off a dust explosion.
14	14	"Weakest vs. Strongest (Strongest vs. Weakest)"; Transliteration: "Saijaku tai Saikyō (Saikyō tai Saijaku)" (Japanese: 最強VS最弱(さいじゃくたいさいきょう))	Katsushi Sakurabi	Satoru Nishizono	Yūichi Nihei	January 8, 2009 (Note: Episode 14 onwards for the rest of the season began airing first on AT-X)
Tōma survives the explosion and is found by Accelerator, who became impressed by managing to bring him so close to death. He lands a hit on Accelerator and realizes his Imagine Breaker can nullify the latter's ability, making him physically beat him up with his right hand. Accelerator breaks away and begins to manipulate the air to launch projectiles at Tōma, who got saved by the arrival of Mikoto. However, Mikoto realizes Accelerator is creating a plasma attack by controlling the direction of the wind and condensing it into one place. She finds an injured Misaka #10032 and convinces her to tell the other Sisters to increase the city's wind turbines to disrupt the wind Accelerator needed for his attack. Accelerator is unable to form a plasma storm and tries to make a final lunge at Tōma, but gets knocked down by him instead. Tōma wakes up in a hospital with Misaka #10032 and learns about the cancellation of the experiment, with the surviving Sisters to be sent for treatment. In the morning, Mikoto visits Tōma and appreciates him for saving the Sisters. Index later visits him and wants him to ask her for help next time.
15	15	"Angel Fall"; Transliteration: "Enzeru Fōru" (Japanese: 御使堕し(エンゼルフォール))	Tamaki Nakatsu	Seishi Minakami	Tamaki Nakatsu	January 15, 2009
Komoe sends Tōma, with Index tagging along, off to a beach resort until things calm down in Academy City. Tōma is relieved to see his father named Tōya Kamijō but finds his cousin named Otohime Tatsugami and his mother named Shīna Kamijō resembling Mikoto and Index, respectively. Moreover, Tōma becomes confused to see the townspeople have changed to familiar faces, yet he seems to be the only one who noticed the difference. He later encounters a strange blonde girl and gets threatened by her with a saw on his neck as she questions him for being the caster of the spell that caused the disturbance. Luckily, Kaori and Motoharu arrive to prove Tōma's innocence from the spell called "Angel Fall". The blonde girl introduces herself as a magician from Annihilatus of the Russian Orthodox Church named Misha Kreutzev. They conclude Tōma is unaffected since he is at the center of this spell in which everyone had changed their appearance and the spell will end if the ritual site is destroyed or the spell caster is defeated. Motoharu reveals himself to be a member of Necessarius as a spy, surprising Tōma.
16	16	"Tōya Kamijō (Father)"; Transliteration: "Kamijō Tōya (Chichi Oya)" (Japanese: 父親(かみじょうとうや))	Takashi Kawabata	Seishi Minakami	Kazuo Takigawa	January 22, 2009
Kaori, Motoharu, and Misha, all suggesting that the spell caster must be someone close to Tōma, join him at the beach resort at night to investigate the source of the spell. Motoharu reveals being an onmyōji before becoming an esper. He and Kaori cast a spell earlier against Angel Fall but they remain affected, appearing to others as a famous pop singer named Hajime Hitotsui and Stiyl respectively. Kaori mentions being a priestess of the Amakusa Church, a Japanese Catholic organization, before leaving them due to her resentment of her position and the concept of luck and fortune, and a Saint with the ability to temporarily use holy powers called "Stigma". Tōma later gives Misha gum using his right hand but she hesitantly takes it, with her somehow indicating knowledge of Angel Fall firsthand. The following day, Misha insists on accompanying Shīna back to Kamijō's new home but Tōma and Motoharu decide to arrive first due to suspicion. Tōma finds Tōya's appearance unchanged upon seeing his family photos. He races back to the resort and confronts his father, whom he deduced to be the spell caster.
17	17	"The Power of God (Archangel)"; Transliteration: "Kami no Chikara (Dai Tenshi)" (Japanese: 大天使(かみのちから))	Toshikazu Hashimoto	Seishi Minakami	Yūichi Nihei	January 29, 2009
It turns out Tōya knows nothing about Angel Fall. Misha shows up and reveals herself to be Archangel Gabriel, the fallen angel from Heaven who took the appearance of Sasha Kreutzev, and plans to kill Tōma to grant her return. While Kaori holds the archangel off, Motoharu tells Tōma and Tōya about their residence to be the ritual site since the latter arranged occult souvenirs around the house in feng shui. He plans to destroy Tōya due to the fact of him being the cause of Angel Fall's casting. Tōma tries to stop Motoharu but the latter beat him up then knocks Tōya out. Motoharu suddenly casts a powerful spell to destroy the ritual site despite the risk of using magic, allowing Archangel Gabriel to return to Heaven. Tōma wakes up at a hospital and is surprised to see Motoharu alive and well, all thanks to his psychic healing ability called "Auto-Rebirth". Motoharu mentions being a freelance spy for many organizations. Tōya and Shīna visit Tōma, who became outraged upon learning the destruction of his family's house. However, Tōma suffers from Index's wrath for mistreating her while under the spell, appearing as Aogami the whole time.
18	18	"Replica (Impostor)"; Transliteration: "Repurika (Nise-mono)" (Japanese: 偽者(レプリカ))	Hideki Tachibana	Akira Tanizaki	Hideki Tachibana	February 5, 2009
Mikoto is being stalked by Mitsuki Unabara, the Tokiwadai Middle School principal's grandson, since the last week of summer vacation. She sees Tōma and his friends passing by her dormitory and decides to pretend to go on a date with him. After an embarrassing mix-up with hotdog sandwiches, Tōma learns from Mikoto that less than ten of the Sisters remained in Academy City. Mikoto later goes to a restaurant, while Tōma encounters Mitsuki. Tōma then sees an identical Mitsuki entering the restaurant, realizing he is with an impostor. He flees and calls Index, who revealed the impostor uses Aztecan sorcery to duplicate Mitsuki's appearance and wields the obsidian spearhead of Tlahuizcalpantecuhtli. As Tōma fights him at a construction site, the impostor reveals his mission to become close to his friends to prevent the formation of the Kamijō Faction that might destroy the truce between magic and science sides. He plans to kill Tōma to protect Mikoto, whom he had fallen in love with. After being severely injured from falling steel beams, the impostor makes Tōma promise him to protect Mikoto. Meanwhile, Mikoto listens nearby and becomes embarrassed upon hearing Tōma's response.
19	19	"Last Order (The End)"; Transliteration: "Rasuto Ōdā (Uchidome)" (Japanese: 打ち止め(ラストオーダー))	Tsuyoshi Yoshimoto	Masanao Akahoshi	Minoru Ōhara	February 12, 2009
Since his defeat, Accelerator is no longer feared by others, though he remains powerful enough to get rid of troublemakers. During the last day of summer vacation, he is approached by a younger Misaka clone capable of showing emotions, who introduced herself as Last Order, and is being followed by her as he returns to his apartment, much to his annoyance. Accelerator later takes a hungry Last Order to a restaurant and sees Ao Amai, a former researcher of the Sisters Project, but does not pursue him. As she eats, Last Order converses with Accelerator about the Sisters and her belief in him as an unwilling participant of Project Level 6 Shift. Accelerator leaves her at the restaurant to confront Kikyō Yoshikawa, a researcher in charge of Project Level 6 Shift. Kikyō informs him about Last Order's creation as the administrator of the Misaka Network and Ao injecting a virus into her, which could spread to other Sisters and cause them to go berserk. To stop the virus from being activated by midnight, she gives Accelerator the choice of finding Ao to learn how to stop it or returning Last Order to her incubator, in which he chose the latter.
20	20	"Virus Code (Final Signal)"; Transliteration: "Wirusu・Kōdo (Saishū Shingō)" (Japanese: 最終信号(ウィルス・コード))	Daisuke Takashima	Satoru Nishizono	Kunihisa Sugishima	February 19, 2009
Accelerator returns to the diner and learns about Last Order being kidnapped by Ao. He manages to track him down and knocks him out before he can escape with her. However, the virus in Last Order activates earlier than expected and Kikyō is still en route with her incubator. Accelerator uses his ability, along with the clean copy of Last Order's data, to remove the virus. Near the end of the process, Ao regains consciousness and shoots Accelerator in the head. Accelerator is unable to fully stop the bullet due to choosing to finish removing the virus instead of protecting himself and collapses afterward. Ao tries to finish him off but he gets shot by Kikyō, who recently arrived to put Last Order into her incubator. After they discussed their roles as researchers and she mentioned her dream of becoming a teacher, he and Kikyō shoot each other. Kikyō awakens in a hospital and learns from Heaven Canceller, Tōma's frog-faced doctor, about Accelerator saving her and suffering brain damage from the shot he took, which required rehabilitation.
21	21	"Counter Stop (Identity Unknown)"; Transliteration: "Kauntā Sutoppu (Shōtai Fumei)" (Japanese: 正体不明(カウンターストップ))	Shinsuke Yanagi	Satoru Nishizono	Tetsuya Yanagisawa	February 26, 2009
After the summer break, Tōma returns to school and learns Komoe is researching about AIM (An Involuntary Movement), a diffusion field of power that espers emit. Index is sent away by Komoe when she arrived at Tōma's class and Aisa introduces herself as the new transfer student. She runs into another transfer student named Hyōka Kazakiri and befriends her. Tōma later finds them, but Komoe catches him skipping the opening ceremony and they later notice Hyōka's sudden disappearance. Aisa becomes suspicious of Hyōka, whom she recalled as the top student in her previous school, and warns Tōma about her. Meanwhile, Motoharu meets with Aleister in regards to the illegal arrival of a Necessarius magician named Sherry Cromwell and, despite Motoharu's offer to take care of Sherry discreetly to preserve the peace between Necessarius and Academy City, Aleister wants Tōma to defeat her since his involvement will help the "key" to the Imaginary Number District. As Tōma, Index, and Hyōka head to an underground mall for lunch, Kuroko finds Sherry and attacks her unsuccessfully when the latter summoned a golem. She is saved by Mikoto but Sherry escapes and casts a spell to send mud eyes throughout the city.
22	22	"Golem (Stone Figure)"; Transliteration: "Gōremu (Sekizō)" (Japanese: 石像(ゴーレム))	Hiroshi Tsuruta	Masanao Akahoshi	Yūichi Nihei	March 5, 2009
Sherry begins her assault on Academy City to start a war between them and Necessarius. As a result, Tōma, Index, and Hyōka are trapped in the underground mall before they can be evacuated with other civilians. Mikoto and Kuroko find them, with the latter teleporting Index and Mikoto away to safety. Tōma confronts Sherry, who recently defeated the Anti-Skill led by one of his school teachers named Aiho Yomikawa, and leaves Hyōka to wait for Kuroko to return. Hyōka shows up as Tōma tries to fight Sherry's golem named Ellis and her face gets hit, revealing a prism-like object in her head. Sherry decides to pursue a fleeing Hyōka, while Tōma receives a call from Komoe and learns she is an artificial being created from the AIM diffusion fields. Hyōka manages to regenerate her face as Sherry insults her for being a monster. She is about to get crushed by Golem Ellis when Tōma showed up and saved her.
23	23	"Friends (Hyōka Kazakiri)"; Transliteration: "Tomodachi (Kazakiri Hyōka)" (Japanese: 風斬氷華(トモダチ))	Hideki Tachibana	Masanao Akahoshi	Yoshitomo Yonetani	March 12, 2009
Tōma successfully destroys Sherry's golem with Imagine Breaker. As Sherry summons another one, he coordinates with Anti-Skills to put her on the defensive. However, when Sherry suddenly decided to flee, Tōma realizes her target is not Hyōka specifically but anyone valuable enough to trigger a war between Necessarius and Academy City, indicating Index is Sherry's next target. Hyōka, acknowledging how she came into being, chooses to save Index and escapes the underground mall without Tōma. Meanwhile, Index separates from Mikoto to pursue a runaway Sphinx and is attacked by Golem Ellis. Though Index can hold her own against it by interfering with its remote-controlled mechanism, the golem switches to automated control and she is about to be crushed until something unexpected happens.
24	24	"Imaginary Number School District - Five-Element Agency"; Transliteration: "Kyosū Gakku - Gogyō Kikan" (Japanese: 虚数学区・五行機関)	Tamaki Nakatsu	Masanao Akahoshi	Tamaki Nakatsu	March 19, 2009
Tōma goes after Hyōka but encounters Sherry instead. He learns from her about her friend, also named Ellis, who was an esper involved in an experiment between Necessarius and Academy City twenty years ago to create the first esper-magician hybrid, but she suffered from the experiment and was killed by the Knights. Sherry intends to divide both sides forever to prevent this tragedy from occurring again. Tōma becomes outraged at Sherry for not believing how different people like Index and Hyōka could become friends and successfully knocks her down. However, her defeat results in Golem Ellis above ground losing control. Index is cornered until Hyōka suddenly appears and destroys the golem each time it reforms. After Tōma arrived to deliver the finishing blow, Index and Hyōka reconcile, with the latter later fading away to return to the Imaginary Number District. Meanwhile, Motoharu confronts Aleister upon realizing the Board Chairman is behind the whole incident and warns him about Tōma becoming his enemy if he keeps using him. In London, Stiyl meets with the Archbishop of Canterbury named Lola Stuart, who mentioned Kaori going missing in Japan after the events of Angel Fall.

== Cast and characters ==
=== Main ===
- Atsushi Abe as Toma Kamijo
- Yuka Iguchi as Index
- Rina Satō as Mikoto Misaka
- Shizuka Itō as Kaori Kanzaki
- Kishō Taniyama as Stiyl Magnus
- Anri Katsu as Motoharu Tsuchimikado
- Kimiko Koyama as Komoe Tsukuyomi
- Satomi Arai as Kuroko Shirai
- Nobuhiko Okamoto as Accelerator

=== Recurring ===
- Yoshihisa Kawahara as Pierce Aogami
- Yutaka Nakano as Heaven Canceller
- Mamiko Noto as Aisa Himegami
- Nozomi Sasaki as the Sisters
- Kana Asumi as Hyōka Kazakiri
- Yūko Kaida as Aiho Yomikawa
- Akeno Watanabe as Sherry Cromwell

== Production ==
=== Development and writing ===
In June 2008, an anime television adaptation of Kazuma Kamachi's A Certain Magical Index was confirmed through a promotional sleeve wrapper of the light novel's 16th volume. J.C.Staff was announced to be producing the series, while Hiroshi Nishikiori, who previously worked on Angelic Layer: Mobile Angel, Masanao Akahoshi, who wrote several episodes of Sky Girls, and Yuichi Tanaka were confirmed as director, series composition writer, and character animation designer, respectively. Kazuma Miki, the light novel editor, wanted to make changes during the process of adapting the light novel into anime but felt a "double-edged sword" when thinking how to bring "Kamachi's color" to it and what fans would find interesting. Nishikiori laid out the concept of "following the original story" instead and aimed to have the viewers say so as well. The series adapted the first to the sixth volume of the light novel.

=== Casting ===
Atsushi Abe, Yuka Iguchi, Rina Satō, and Satomi Arai reprise their respective roles from the drama CD of the series, which was released in 2007, as Toma Kamijo, Index, Mikoto Misaka, and Kuroko Shirai. The main cast also includes Shizuka Itō as Kaori Kanzaki, Kishō Taniyama as Stiyl Magnus, Anri Katsu as Motoharu Tsuchimikado, Kimiko Koyama as Komoe Tsukuyomi, and Nobuhiko Okamoto as Accelerator.

On August 25, 2012, Funimation announced the English dub cast for the series. These include Micah Solusod as Kamijo, Monica Rial as Index, Brittney Karbowski as Misaka, Alison Viktorin as Shirai, Morgan Garrett as Kanzaki, Robert McCollum as Magnus, Newton Pittman as Tsuchimikado, Jad Saxton as Tsukuyomi, and Austin Tindle as Accelerator.

=== Music ===
I've Sound was selected to compose the music for the series due to Nishikiori's desire to have a "trance-like" soundtrack. Mami Kawada performed the first opening theme music, which was used from episodes 1 to 16 (the DVD release updated the final use of it to episode 14), titled "PSI-Missing" and the second one, which was used from episode 17 (episode 15 in the DVD release) onwards, titled "Masterpiece". Iku performed the first ending theme music titled "Rimless ~Rimless World~" (Rimless 〜フチナシノセカイ〜, Rimless ~Fuchinashi no Sekai~) and the second one, which was used from episode 20 onwards, titled "Oath ~Just a Little Once More~" (誓い言 〜スコシだけもう一度〜, Chikaigoto ~Sukoshi Dake Mō Ichido~).

== Marketing ==
In July 2008, Geneon Entertainment released a promotional video for the upcoming release of the series. In August 2008, Iguchi hosted a talk show event alongside Eri Kitamura, who voiced Ami Kawashima from Toradora!, at the 74th Comiket in Odaiba to promote their series. In October, the staff and cast of the series were present during a stage event at Dengeki Bunko Autumn Festival 2008 in Akihabara.

== Release ==
=== Broadcast ===
A Certain Magical Index began airing in Japan on CTC, tvk, and MBS on October 5, 2008, on TVS on October 7, and on CBC and AT-X on October 9. The series began broadcasting in North America on the Funimation Channel on January 21, 2013.

=== Home media ===
Japanese Blu-ray & DVD release
Vol.	Episodes	Release date	Ref.
1	1–3	January 23, 2009	
2	4–6	February 25, 2009	
3	7–9	March 25, 2009	
4	10–12	April 24, 2009	
5	13–15	May 29, 2009	
6	16–18	June 26, 2009	
7	19–21	July 24, 2009	
8	22–24	August 21, 2009	

Geneon Entertainment released eight Blu-ray and DVD volumes of A Certain Magical Index in Japan starting January 23, 2009. Each volume contains a bonus novel written by Kamachi titled A Certain Scientific Railgun SS: Liberal Arts City, while the first and fifth volumes are bundled with episodes 1 and 2 of the bonus anime A Certain Magical Index-tan. The first DVD set containing the first twelve episodes of the season was released on December 17, 2010, while the second DVD set containing the remaining episodes was released on March 9, 2011.

Funimation began streaming the series in North America in September 2012. They later released two DVD volumes on December 18, 2012, after getting delayed from its original October 30 release, while a Blu-ray and DVD combo set was released on November 18, 2014. Universal Sony Pictures Home Entertainment released two DVD volumes in Australia on April 24, 2013. Hulu released the series in Japan on March 24, 2022. Muse Asia began streaming the series on their official YouTube channel on April 19, 2022.

== Reception ==
=== Critical response ===
Ian Wolf of Anime UK News scored A Certain Magical Index 7 out of 10, praising the action scenes, voice acting, and animation quality while calling the music "OK". Carlo Santos of Anime News Network graded the season 'C+', feeling that the "fight scenes, mind-bending story ideas, and unlikely plot twists" would delight fans but criticizing the "long-winded dialogue" and arrangement of story arcs that left "no sense of progression over the season". Nicole MacLean of THEM Anime Reviews was critical of the show's characters, describing Toma Kamijo a "boring and ineffective lead", the bond between him and Index "staler and shallower" than Toradora! characters Ryuji Takasu and Taiga Aisaka, and Mikoto Misaka a "poorly-written character", unlike her appearance in A Certain Scientific Railgun series. She rated the season 2 out of 5 stars, stating that it "isn't a total loss, but... was a bit of a tedious series".

=== Accolade ===
Abe won Best Rookie at the 4th Seiyu Awards for his role as Toma Kamijo.
