= A Certain Magical Index season 2 =

2010 Japanese television season

A Certain Magical Index
- Season 2
- First home media volume cover, featuring Toma Kamijo (L) and Index (R)
- Starring: Atsushi Abe; Yuka Iguchi; Rina Satō; Shizuka Itō; Kishō Taniyama; Anri Katsu; Kimiko Koyama; Satomi Arai; Nobuhiko Okamoto
- No. of episodes: 24

Release
- Original network: AT-X
- Original release: October 8, 2010 – April 1, 2011

Season chronology
- ← Previous; Season 1 Next → Season 3

The second season of the Japanese animated television series A Certain Magical Index, marketed as A Certain Magical Index II, is based on the light novel series of the same name written by Kazuma Kamachi and illustrated by Kiyotaka Haimura. The season follows the adventures of Toma Kamijo and Index as they face the threat of the Roman Catholic Church. Produced by J.C.Staff, the season saw Hiroshi Nishikiori and Masanao Akahoshi respectively serving as director and series composition writer.

Atsushi Abe and Yuka Iguchi reprise their respective roles as the lead characters Kamijo and Index. The returning cast also includes Rina Satō, Shizuka Itō, Kishō Taniyama, Anri Katsu, Kimiko Koyama, Satomi Arai, and Nobuhiko Okamoto. The second season was confirmed in June 2010 and adapts from the seventh to the thirteenth volume of the light novel.

The second season consists of 24 episodes and ran on AT-X from October 8, 2010, to April 1, 2011, with other networks following days later. A third season was announced in October 2017 as part of the "A Certain Project 2018" event.

== Episodes ==
No. overall	No. in season	Title	Directed by	Written by	Storyboarded by	Original release date
25	1	"The Last Day (August 31)"; Transliteration: "Saigo no Hi (Hachi-tsuki Sanjūichi-nichi)" (Japanese: 8月31日(さいごのひ))	Tamaki Nakatsu	Masanao Akahoshi	Tamaki Nakatsu	October 8, 2010
Tōma Kamijō struggles to complete his summer homework at home because Index keeps on distracting him. Tōma decides to take Index to a restaurant for a change of location but it becomes the worst day of his life when a magician named Ōma Yamisaka attacked them, kidnapped Index, and ran off. As Tōma tries to find her and runs into Mikoto Misaka along the way, Ōma prepares a ceremony that would allow him to access the grimoires inside Index's head to find a cure for a curse inflicted on a woman he fell in love with. As the ceremony begins, Ōma's body and mind are put through excruciating pain while trying to access the grimoires. Index discreetly uses her new cellphone to contact Tōma, helping him to find her and stop the ceremony. Tōma gets Ōma to snap out of his depression and offers to cure the woman's curse using his Imagine Breaker. Meanwhile, Motoharu Tsuchimikado witnesses Kaori Kanzaki fighting and defeating the Knights of England in Japan before parting ways.
26	2	"The Book of Law"; Transliteration: "Hō no Sho" (Japanese: 法の書)	Yoshitaka Koyama	Masanao Akahoshi	Michio Fukuda	October 15, 2010
Archbishop of Canterbury Lola Stuart informs Stiyl Magnus that the Amakusa Church stole The Book of the Law and kidnapped a skilled decoder named Orsola Aquinas. She sends him to Japan to work with the group of Roman Catholic battle nuns called "Agnese Forces" in searching for the grimoire as well as Orsola. Stiyl pretends to kidnap Index to get Tōma's assistance. Tōma coincidentally encounters Orsola on his way to save Index and brings her with him. The Amakusa Catholics suddenly appear via a hole in the ground and abduct her. After they determined the Amakusa Catholics' goal of using special teleportation magic to escape with Orsola before midnight, Tōma, Index, Stiyl, and the Agnese Forces set up camp at the required location. Tōma then gets into awkward situations with the force's leader named Agnese Sanctis. Stiyl knows he may have to fight Kaori if necessary since she is an Amakusa Catholic. Meanwhile, the Amakusa Catholics prepare to make their move.
27	3	"The Amakusa Church"; Transliteration: "Amakusa-shiki" (Japanese: 天草式)	Tomohiro Kamitani & Masato Jinbo	Masanao Akahoshi	Tomohiro Kamitani	October 22, 2010
The Agnese Forces face off against the Amakusa Catholics at an amusement park, while Tōma, Index, and Stiyl sneak inside. Tōma manages to escape from pursuing Amakusa Catholics and bumps into Orsola. He gives her the Celtic cross necklace that Stiyl gave him earlier. The two are reunited with Index and Stiyl then they face off against the leader of the Amakusa Church named Saiji Tatemiya. Tōma and Stiyl work together to defeat Saiji, and the rest of the Amakusa Catholics are captured by the Agnese Forces. Saiji then reveals to Tōma and Index that the Amakusa Catholics never stole The Book of the Law and the Roman Catholic Church wanted to kill Orsola to prevent the secrets of the grimoire from getting decoded and abused. The Amakusa Catholics only get involved when Orsola sought them for protection, but she runs away due to distrust. Troubled by this revelation, Tōma asks two of the Roman Catholic battle nuns named Lucia and Angelene to see Orsola again, but he accidentally angers Lucia, causing her to try to kill him, Index, and Saiji. However, she and Angelene are forced to retreat when Index used spell interception against their attacks.
28	4	"Sheol Fear (Voice of the Magicbane)"; Transliteration: "Sheōru Fia (Mametsu no Koe)" (Japanese: 魔滅の声(シェオールフィア))	Makoto Sokuza	Masanao Akahoshi	Kyo Jyumonji	October 29, 2010
Stiyl explains that the Roman Catholic Church would not kill Orsola until they could prove her to be a heretic. Saiji leaves to free his comrades and Stiyl tells Tōma and Index to go home since they have no further stake in this matter. Tōma secretly goes by himself to a church where Orsola was being held and tortured by Agnese, who revealed that her battle nuns deceived Necessarius to assist them. He is later joined by Stiyl, who revealed that the Church of England placed Orsola under their protection due to the necklace given to her by Tōma, followed by Index and the Amakusa Catholics. While Tōma is put in charge of protecting Orsola, the others fend off the battle nuns as Index utilizes her power called "Sheol Fear" to deafen and paralyze them. However, Lucia brings another force of battle nuns who willingly stabbed their ears to protect themselves from Sheol Fear.
29	5	"Lotus Wand"; Transliteration: "Rōtasu Wando" (Japanese: 蓮の杖(ロータスワンド))	Masato Jinbo	Masanao Akahoshi	Yūichi Nihei	November 5, 2010
Tōma's group barricade themselves from the battle nuns. He and Index come up with an idea to use Orsola's skill to decipher The Book of the Law in Index's head for their advantage. When Orsola mentioned her deciphering method, Index reveals her translations are false, proving her inability to decode the grimoire at all. Tōma confronts Agnese wielding a weapon called "Lotus Wand", while the others fight the battle nuns. He manages to learn her weapon's attack patterns and lands a hit on Agnese. Agnese tries to bluff Tōma sacrificing his friends as decoys, but they suddenly arrive with Innocentius, who Stiyl managed to summon with the help of Amakusa Catholics. With her confidence broken, Agnese is knocked out by Tōma, breaking the battle nuns' morale. Tōma wakes up in a hospital at Academy City and is greeted by Kaori, who thanked him for his assistance. She tells him that the Church of England would protect Orsola and the Amakusa Catholics. Back in London, Lola reveals to Stiyl her true reason for involving in the Orsola incident is to get the Amakusa Catholics under her control and use them as leverage to ensure Kaori's loyalty.
30	6	"Remnant (Wreckage)"; Transliteration: "Remunanto (Zangai)" (Japanese: 残骸(レムナント))	Mamoru Enomoto	Seishi Minakami	Tsuneo Kobayashi	November 12, 2010
Kuroko Shirai goes out shopping with Mikoto but she gets interrupted by her colleague at Judgment named Kazari Uiharu, who reported about robbers stealing an aerospace travel case. Kuroko subdues the thieves but she is then attacked and wounded by their leader and another teleporter named Awaki Musujime. She reveals to Kuroko about the Tree Diagram's destruction and how various factions planned to gather its remnants like the ones inside the travel case. Kuroko manages to escape but she becomes concerned over what Awaki had told her, particularly her mentioning about Mikoto's attempts to stop them for reasons she had kept from her, namely preventing the reconstruction of the Tree Diagram that could restart the Level 6 Shift Project. Later night, Kuroko decides to follow Mikoto and overhears her conversation with Awaki before the latter escapes. As Kuroko decides to take matters into her own hands, Misaka #10032 decides to take action.
31	7	"Move Point (Coordinate Relocation)"; Transliteration: "Mūbu Pointo (Zahyō Idō)" (Japanese: 座標移動(ムーブポイント))	Masato Jinbo	Seishi Minakami	Masayuki Miyaji	November 19, 2010
Kuroko finds Awaki at a nearby building and uses the latter's trauma of self-teleportation to make the first strike, but her injuries prevent her from teleporting to safety. Awaki explains to Kuroko that she and her organization called "Science Syndicate" planned to build a new Tree Diagram to create other species of espers. She persuades Kuroko to join her in their cause, but the latter rejects her offer and verbally abuses her for making excuses. Kuroko tries to attack Awaki but gets shot instead. After a brief traumatic loss of control over her powers, Awaki attempts to kill Kuroko by dropping the building on top of her. Mikoto and Tōma, who came to the rescue after he was alerted by Misaka #10032, arrive to save Kuroko. As the Anti-Skill apprehends the Science Syndicate, Awaki tries to escape but is confronted by Accelerator, who used the Misaka Network to utilize his powers in defeating her and destroying the Tree Diagram's remnants. The following day, Mikoto gives her thanks to Kuroko, while the latter is recovering in a hospital.
32	8	"The Daihasei Festival"; Transliteration: "Daihasei-sai" (Japanese: 大覇星祭)	Shinya Kawatsura	Miya Asakawa	Shinya Kawatsura	November 26, 2010
Academy City is hosting a sports competition between various schools of the city called "Daihaseisai Festival", allowing visitors from outside the city to enter and watch the event. While Tōma's parents, Tōya Kamijō and Shīna Kamijō, as well as Misuzu Misaka, assumed to be Mikoto's older sister, get to know each other, Tōma and Mikoto decide to make a bet to make the loser do anything the winner wants. Back in London, Lola contacts Board Chairman Aleister Crowley to inform him about the infiltration of magicians in his city to make a transaction with a magical weapon that could kill a Saint called "Stab Sword". Meanwhile, Tōma has several troubles with a hungry Index and awkward situations with the pseudo-class representative named Seiri Fukiyose. Later, Tōma runs into Stiyl and Motoharu, who told him about the intruding magicians and asked him not to get Index involved. While getting scolded by Seiri after an awkward incident with Index and Komoe Tsukuyomi, Tōma runs into a woman named Oriana Thomson. When his Imagine Breaker reacted to her, Tōma realizes she is one of the magicians in question and starts to follow her.
33	9	"Route Disturb (Pursuit Inhibited)"; Transliteration: "Rūto Disutābu (Tsuiseki Fūji)" (Japanese: 追跡封じ(ルートディスターブ))	Daisuke Tokudo	Miya Asakawa	Daisuke Tokudo	December 3, 2010
Tōma, Stiyl, and Motoharu chase Oriana through a bus station filled with magic traps but she manages to escape and uses counter magic called "Shorthand" to avoid being tracked. Stiyl and Motoharu undergo a painful magical spell to locate Shorthand despite Tōma's objections, which happened to be in the center of a middle school ball-tossing match. With the competitors in danger of being hurt by the spell if they touch it, Tōma and Motoharu infiltrate the match as contestants to destroy it but they find themselves competing against Mikoto's school. Tōma tries to protect Mikoto from one of the basket poles he believed the Shorthand attached to but Seiri ends up touching the real one, getting hit by magic and falling unconscious before Tōma destroys the spell. As Seiri is taken to the hospital, Tōma vows to make Oriana pay for what she did.
34	10	"Shorthand (Stenographic Sourcebook)"; Transliteration: "Shōtohando (Sokki Genten)" (Japanese: 速記原典(ショートハンド))	Tomohiro Kamitani	Miya Asakawa	Tomohiro Kamitani	December 10, 2010
While Heaven Canceller tends to Seiri, Stiyl manages to lead Tōma and Motoharu to Oriana's location. Oriana inflicts a curse on Motoharu and gives Tōma trouble with her variety of spells yet Tōma's determination allows him to land a hit on her. Oriana escapes but she leaves behind her cargo, which turned out to be a signboard. Lola soon learns that they used Stab Sword as a decoy for an actual artifact called "Croce di Pietro", fearing her since the Roman Catholic Church will use it to place Academy City under their control if the trade goes through. Tōma, Stiyl, and Motoharu are informed of this but they take a break for now to gather more information. Tōma takes lunch with Index, his parents, Mikoto and Misuzu, and is surprised to learn the latter is Mikoto's mother.
35	11	"Stab Sword"; Transliteration: "Sutabu Sōdo" (Japanese: 刺突杭剣(スタブソード))	Mamoru Enomoto	Kurasumi Sunayama	Kyo Jyumonji	December 17, 2010
After he encountered trouble with Index, Mikoto, and Kuroko following lunch, Tōma is informed of Oriana's location and is instructed by Motoharu to go there with Stiyl. As Motoharu tries to track her, Oriana goes straight to his location and attacks him. She defeats him and destroys his search spell but Motoharu bluffs that he called in reinforcements to trick her into running away before she finishes him off. Meanwhile, Aisa Himegami becomes worried about Tōma but Komoe suggests inviting him to a night parade instead. Meanwhile, a fleeing Oriana bumps into them and sees Aisa's Celtic cross necklace. She mistakes her for a Necessarius magician and attacks her with a vicious spell that left her brutally wounded. As Tōma falls into despair upon witnessing Aisa's state, Komoe recalls the healing spell she performed on Index so Stiyl stays to help her perform it while Tōma chases after Oriana.
36	12	"Belvedere (The Observatory)"; Transliteration: "Beruvedēre (Tenmon-dai)" (Japanese: 天文台(ベルヴェデーレ))	Makoto Sokuza	Kurasumi Sunayama	Yūichi Nihei	December 24, 2010
After they lost track of Oriana, Tōma and Motoharu realize she is scouting the city to find the perfect location to use Croce di Pietro. Orsola contacts them with information about the need for a large open area with visible constellations at sundown to activate the artifact. Motoharu figures out that the airport located at Academy City's District 23 would be the perfect area to activate the cross. Tōma, Stiyl, and Motoharu head to the location quickly as sundown is approaching. By the time they arrived at the airport, a Roman Catholic nun and Oriana's accomplice named Lidvia Lorenzetti has brought Croce di Pietro and starts activating its magic while Oriana defends her from the trio, defeating both Motoharu and Stiyl, with Tōma the only one left standing.
37	13	"Croce di Pietro (Apostolic Cross)"; Transliteration: "Kurōche di Pietoro (Shito Jūji)" (Japanese: 使徒十字(クローチェディピエトロ))	Masato Jinbo	Kurasumi Sunayama	Michio Fukuda	January 7, 2011
As Oriana and Tōma continue to battle, Stiyl recovers and summons Innocentius. Refusing to give up, Oriana uses her full powers to defeat Stiyl and Tōma. As he is about to lose consciousness, Tōma remembers his promises to his friends and recuperate himself to finally defeat Oriana. However, Lidvia contacts them and reveals she is currently outside the city along with Croce di Pietro. Luckily, the night parade that contained fireworks event has started, blocking out the stars and preventing the cross' activation. As he is confined in a hospital, Tōma is visited by Index, Kuroko, and Mikoto, who informed him about his loss in their bet. Meanwhile, Lidvia escapes via a private jet but is tracked down by Lola, with the help of Stiyl's rune cards, and ejected out of the plane. Despite Lola offering to save her if she surrenders, she refuses and chooses to fall to her death while protecting Croce di Pietro. At the same time, Aleister decides to take action personally due to these recent events. The next morning, Aisa is visited by Index and later, to her joy, Tōma.
38	14	"City of Water"; Transliteration: "Mizu no Miyako" (Japanese: 水の都)	Tamaki Nakatsu	Masanao Akahoshi	Tamaki Nakatsu	January 14, 2011
Despite a chain of bad luck with his female companions during the festival, Tōma gets lucky on the last day when he won a lottery for a one-week trip to Chioggia, Italy. When he and Index arrived at the coastal town, Tōma tries to find her after she got lost but he is found by Orsola, who managed to find Index. Later, Orsola explains to them that she and the Amakusa Catholics came to help pack and move her belongings to London. After they helped them, Tōma and Index are about to go to their hotel when two assassins tried to kill Orsola but their attempts are thwarted by Tōma and Index. One of the assassins escapes by summoning a sailing ship made of ice in the canal, causing Tōma and Orsola to accidentally board it. As they hide from their pursuers inside the ship, Tōma and Orsola realize the assassins are from the Roman Catholic Church and there is a fleet of ice ships heading towards the Adriatic Sea. When someone tried to enter the room they used to hide, Tōma prepares himself and is surprised to find out it is Agnese.
39	15	"Queen's Fleet"; Transliteration: "Joō Kantai" (Japanese: 女王艦隊)	Masato Jinbo	Masanao Akahoshi	Yūichi Nihei	January 21, 2011
Agnese reveals they are on a fleet of magical ships called the "Queen's Fleet". She agrees to let Tōma and Orsola escape in exchange for rescuing Lucia and Angelene. As Agnese goes to the fleet's flagship to meet its commander named Bishop Biagio Busoni, Tōma and Orsola manage to find and rescue Lucia and Angelene. The latter two mention the danger awaiting Agnese since she will be used for a spell that would destroy her brain. Suddenly, the other ships start shooting at them, causing them to fall into the sea, but they are rescued by Index and the Amakusa Catholics using a magical submersible boat. After they learned that the spell Biagio intended to use with Agnese could destroy cities and erase their culture, the Amakusa Catholics agree to help Tōma rescue Agnese. They launch an attack on the fleet, where Tōma and his group faced up against the Agnese Forces. The other ships attempt to sink the ship boarded both Tōma's group and the battle nuns, causing Angelene to get injured after she saved one of the nuns.
40	16	"Rosary of the Appointed Time"; Transliteration: "Kokugen no Rozario" (Japanese: 刻限のロザリオ)	Shinya Watada	Masanao Akahoshi	Tetsuya Yanagisawa	January 28, 2011
Lucia and the Amakusa Catholics hold off the battle nuns, while Tōma, Index, and Orsola continue onwards to the flagship. While he distracts an army of ice golems, Tōma soon encounters Biagio, who used his cross spell to defeat him. Meanwhile, Orsola manages to find Agnese but also meets Biagio and hears his plan of using Agnese to activate the fleet's power to destroy Academy City. As Biagio subdues them, Tōma arrives and knocks him down. With the failure of his plans, Biagio activates the fleet's self-destruction spell. Tōma orders Orsola to escape with Agnese and the others, while he fights Biagio, finally defeating him and stopping the spell despite the flagship sinking. As he wakes up in a hospital, Tōma gets a call from Heaven Canceller, who informed him about being flown back to Academy City and Mikoto's bet. In London, Kaori greets Orsola, who arrived with Agnese, after being informed of the recent events by Motoharu. In Vatican City, a piercing-covered nun from God's Right Seat forces the Pope to sign an order to investigate Tōma and eliminate him if he is seen as an enemy.
41	17	"Penalty Game"; Transliteration: "Batsu Gēmu" (Japanese: 罰ゲーム)	Shinya Kawatsura	Seishi Minakami	Shinya Kawatsura	February 4, 2011
Autumn arrives at Academy City and the students change into their winter uniforms. Accelerator, Last Order, and Kikyō Yoshikawa move out of the hospital into Aiho Yomikawa's apartment while Misaka #10032 and three other Sisters begin rehabilitation under Heaven Canceller's care. Meanwhile, Mikoto has Tōma do whatever she wants as promised in their bet by dragging him to a mobile phone shop that offered a Gekota phone strap for buyers signing a couples plan. However, they have to take a photo of themselves as a loving couple to qualify for the offer, which got ruined by a jealous Kuroko intervening them. Elsewhere, Last Order gets herself locked out of the apartment and makes Misaka #10032 fun of her situation. Last Order is jealous of being the only Misaka clone without a goggle so she steals Misaka #10032's goggle and runs off with them.
42	18	"Serial Number (Specimen Number)"; Transliteration: "Shiriaru Nanbā (Kentai Bangō)" (Japanese: 検体番号(シリアルナンバー))	Kōsuke Kobayashi	Seishi Minakami	Masayuki Miyaji	February 11, 2011
In London, the ladies of Necessarius have trouble learning how to use a new washing machine. Back in Academy City, Mikoto finally claims her phone straps while Tōma encounters Misaka #10032 searching for Last Order and buys her a necklace to distinguish her from Mikoto. When Mikoto rejoined them, Misaka #10032 starts teasing her and clinging onto Tōma, attracting the attention of Last Order before Misaka #10032 chases after her again. Elsewhere, Hyōka Kazakiri appears from the Imaginary Number District and is apprehended by the Anti-Skill. Accelerator heads to the underground mall to look for Last Order and ends up encountering Index, who decided to help him search for Last Order after he treated her to a meal. Meanwhile, Last Order approaches Tōma to thank him for stopping the Level 6 Shift experiment and mentions her hopes to protect Accelerator. Tōma and Last Order soon part ways and join up with Index and Accelerator respectively, though the two boys are unable to see each other, to head home.
43	19	"The Researcher (Amata Kihara)"; Transliteration: "Kenkyū-sha (Kihara Amata)" (Japanese: 木原数多(けんきゅうしゃ))	Daisuke Tokudo	Seishi Minakami	Daisuke Tokudo	February 18, 2011
In Russia, Sasha Kreutzev tries to learn the side effects of being possessed by Archangel Gabriel but gets harassed by her superior named Vasilisa. Back in Academy City, Last Order scrapes her knees on the way home with Accelerator, prompting him to buy her bandages. However, Accelerator is attacked by a group of armed soldiers called "Hound Dogs" led by his old mentor named Amata Kihara. He easily defeats the soldiers, but Amata manages to beat him up. Accelerator manages to muster up enough strength to blow Last Order away to safety before Index shows up on the scene. Meanwhile, Tōma goes looking for Index and witnesses a group of Anti-Skill mysteriously falling unconscious. He runs into Last Order asking for his help. Meanwhile, a magician from God's Right Seat named Vento of the Front infiltrates Academy City and contacts Aleister to inform him about how she neutralized the Anti-Skill and Judgment forces and killed three of his Board of Directors. Unfazed by her threats, Aleister orders Amata to deploy the artificial angel called "Fuse Kazakiri" and capture Last Order to eliminate Vento.
44	20	"Hound Dog (Hound Squad)"; Transliteration: "Haundo Doggu (Ryōken Butai)" (Japanese: 猟犬部隊(ハウンドドッグ))	Ayumu Kotake	Masanao Akahoshi	Ayumu Kotake	February 25, 2011
Accelerator uses Index's presence as a distraction to force a Hound Dog driver to get him and her away. Before Amata can go after them, Vento appears and defeats his soldiers. Meanwhile, Tōma and Last Order search for Accelerator and escape from the Hound Dogs chasing after her by hiding in a restaurant, where everyone fell unconscious as well. Accelerator leaves Index in the care of Heaven Canceller and is informed about Last Order's situation. In an attempt to take out the Hound Dogs hunting him, he lures them into a railway factory and kills them off. Tōma and Last Order continue to hide but are confronted by Vento, whose image caused several people, including Aiho and Kazari, to fall unconscious. Tōma defends the unconscious customers and tells Last Order to run away. Vento soon starts coughing up blood and is forced to flee. Accelerator finally kills the last Hound Dog soldier, but his actions have been witnessed by an Anti-Skill patrol unit, putting him as a wanted murder suspect. Meanwhile, Motoharu investigates Vento's actions and comes across a white spectral being.
45	21	"Testament (Learning Device)"; Transliteration: "Tesutamento (Gakushū Sōchi)" (Japanese: 学習装置(テスタメント))	Takashi Ikehata	Masanao Akahoshi	Michio Fukuda	March 4, 2011
Motoharu battles the spectral being, who turned out to be working with Vento to kill the unconscious residents of Academy City. Tōma calls Accelerator from Last Order's cellphone to update him of her status. Accelerator soon learns that Amata managed to capture Last Order, although he keeps her alive for some reason. Aleister then uses Testament with Last Order's authorization to summon an angel to appear in the city to target magic users. Index realizes the angel is Hyōka as she, Tōma, and Mikoto head towards the angel's location. Mikoto holds off the Hound Dogs while Index explains Vento's Divine Retribution targets anyone who experienced a certain emotion towards her and Hyōka is not an ordinary angel. Tōma tells her to work with Mikoto to combine their knowledge of magic and science. Meanwhile, Accelerator breaks into the Hound Dogs' headquarters and confronts Amata. As Tōma witnesses Hyōka's controlled state and feels helpless since using his right hand might kill her, Vento appears before him and threatens to kill them both so Tōma stands to defend Hyōka.
46	22	"The Divine Retribution Spell"; Transliteration: "Tenbatsu Jutsushiki" (Japanese: 天罰術式)	Masato Jinbo	Masanao Akahoshi	Masato Jinbo	March 11, 2011
Accelerator fights Amata, but his choker's battery runs out, severing his connection to the Misaka Network and becoming paralyzed. However, he begins to move again by force of will. Meanwhile, Tōma fights Vento, who continued to be weakened by Testament, while Hyōka makes snow appear over the city to protect the unconscious civilians. Vento reveals her hatred towards science when both she and her little brother got into an accident at an amusement park ride and the hospital only had enough blood to save her alone. Tōma argues against her reasoning for her actions and manages to knock her out. Index appears in the Hound Dogs' headquarters and, with Mikoto's knowledge of science, learns that Last Order served as a container to create the angel. She sings a song to severe the shackles controlling Last Order. The song resonates with Accelerator, who awakened as a result and blasted Amata into the sky. In the end, Acqua of the Back from God's Right Seat shows up and gives Vento's cross to Tōma since her Divine Retribution has been dispelled. He warns Tōma to not fight him as he is a Saint before leaving with Vento.
47	23	"Prewar"; Transliteration: "Kaisen-mae" (Japanese: 開戦前)	Masato Jinbo	Masanao Akahoshi	Tamaki Nakatsu & Hiroshi Nishikiori	March 25, 2011 (Note: Episode 47 was delayed for one week due to the 2011 Tōhoku earthquake and tsunami)
Hyōka returns to normal with Index's help and blames herself for the chaos she caused but Tōma assures her that she also protected the city's populace. Acqua retreats with Vento and the rest of her men from Academy City. Meanwhile, Accelerator is captured by the city's security forces. As the city recovers from Vento's attack, Tōma's class gathers for a dinner at a sukiyaki restaurant where they talked about the upcoming war with Academy City. Meanwhile, the Board of Directors punishes Accelerator for his actions by making him join a special team called "Group", which consisted of Motoharu, Awaki, and Etzali. After his choker's time limit increased, Accelerator joins Group's first mission of neutralizing the threat posed by a gang of Level 0 espers called "Skill Out" led by Ritoku Komaba, who took advantage of the lack of security in the city after the Anti-Skill forced to defend the city's outskirts from attacks by the Roman Catholic Church. Awaki comes across Ritoku as she and Accelerator begin their attack at the Skill Out's home turf.
48	24	"Skill Out (Armed Gang)"; Transliteration: "Sukiru Auto (Busō Shūdan)" (Japanese: 武装集団(スキルアウト))	Shinya Kawatsura	Masanao Akahoshi	Shinya Kawatsura & Hiroshi Nishikiori	April 1, 2011
Awaki finds herself disadvantaged since Ritoku is equipped with a stolen military exosuit. Ritoku then confronts Accelerator by using a chaff grenade to interfere with his choker. However, Accelerator uses a pistol to clear the air and shoot him. He later encounters a drunk Misuzu searching for a university database center. Misuzu then encounters Tōma and Index. Group's leader contacts Accelerator and reveals that Skill Out was hired to kill Misuzu, who planned to take their children out of Academy City before the impending war. Accelerator decides to rescue Misuzu and spots Tōma, who was contacted by her, running towards there as well. Tōma manages to escape with Misuzu, but they get confronted by a Skill Out member named Shiage Hamazura, who wanted to kill her to avoid them from getting exterminated by the city's management. Tōma berates him and knocks him out. Misuzu admits to him her plan to take Mikoto home but feels safe knowing there are people like him to protect her. Accelerator then meets up with Motoharu, Awaki, and Etzali, and they decide to work together so they may one day take on the higher-ups. Index and Hyōka later visit Tōma in a hospital.

== Cast and characters ==
=== Main ===
- Atsushi Abe as Toma Kamijo
- Yuka Iguchi as Index
- Rina Satō as Mikoto Misaka
- Shizuka Itō as Kaori Kanzaki
- Kishō Taniyama as Stiyl Magnus
- Anri Katsu as Motoharu Tsuchimikado
- Kimiko Koyama as Komoe Tsukuyomi
- Satomi Arai as Kuroko Shirai
- Nobuhiko Okamoto as Accelerator

=== Recurring ===
- Mamiko Noto as Aisa Himegami
- Yoshihisa Kawahara as Pierce Aogami
- Aya Endō as Orsola Aquinas
- Rie Kugimiya as Agnese Sanctis
- Mariya Ise as Lucia
- Azusa Enoki as Angelene
- Kohsuke Toriumi as Saiji Tatemiya
- Ai Kayano as Itsuwa
- Ayako Kawasumi as Laura Stuart
- Misato Fukuen as Maika Tsuchimikado
- Aki Toyosaki as Kazari Uiharu
- Harumi Sakurai as Awaki Musujime
- Rina Hidaka as Last Order
- Nozomi Sasaki as Misaka 10032
- Yūko Kaida as Aiho Yomikawa
- Ryoka Yuzuki as Oriana Thomson
- Rei Sakuma as Lidvia Lorenzetti
- Ayumi Fujimura as Seiri Fukiyose
- Kenji Nomura as Tōya Kamijō
- Kikuko Inoue as Shīna Kamijō
- Emi Shinohara as Misuzu Misaka
- Toshihiko Seki as Aleister Crowley
- Yutaka Nakano as Heaven Canceller
- Akiko Hiramatsu as Vento of the Front
- Yumi Tōma as Kikyō Yoshikawa
- Kana Asumi as Hyōka Kazakiri
- Keiji Fujiwara as Amata Kihara

== Production ==
=== Development and writing ===
The production for A Certain Magical Index II was greenlit in June 2010. J.C.Staff returned to produce the series, while Hiroshi Nishikiori, Masanao Akahoshi, and Yuichi Tanaka reunited from the previous season to serve as the director, series composition writer, and character animation designer, respectively. The second season adapted the seventh to the thirteenth volume of A Certain Magical Index light novel series. Yuka Iguchi revealed that Nishikiori instructed her to act "like a big shot with no proof" during recording. Rina Satō also revealed that the staff told her about Mikoto Misaka, her character, falling in love with Toma Kamijo in the second season but felt that their current rivalry was the "best way to go". Kishō Taniyama enjoyed Stiyl Magnus' teasing and tsundere-like nature, and noted that his character was "unbearable". Nozomi Sasaki revealed how she was told to bring out Misaka 10032's "individual differences" among the Misaka clones for the second season, which she found difficult to do since she eliminated it in the first season.

=== Casting ===
In June 2010, Atsushi Abe, Iguchi, and Satō were set to reprise their respective roles as Kamijo, Index, and Misaka. Shizuka Itō, Taniyama, Anri Katsu, Kimiko Koyama, and Nobuhiko Okamoto also reprise their respective roles as Kaori Kanzaki, Magnus, Motoharu Tsuchimikado, Komoe Tsukuyomi, and Accelerator. In September 2010, four new characters belonging to the Roman Catholic Church would be introduced in the series. They are Orsola Aquinas, voiced by Aya Endō, Agnese Sanctis, voiced by Rie Kugimiya, Lucia, voiced by Mariya Ise, and Angelene, voiced by Azusa Enoki.

In July 2014, Funimation announced the English dub cast for the new characters that appeared in the series. These include Mallorie Rodak as Aquinas, Alex Moore as Sanctis, Lauren Landa as Lucia, Kristin Sutton as Angelene, Duncan Brannan as Saiji Tatemiya, Bryn Apprill as Awaki Musujime, Jennifer Green as Oriana Thomson, Rachel Robinson as Lidvia Lorenzetti, and Skyler McIntosh as Seiri Fukiyose. By the following month, Kara Edwards and Marcus Stimac joined the cast as Vento of the Front and Amata Kihara, respectively.

=== Music ===
Maiko Iuchi of I've Sound returned to compose the second season, after previously doing so for A Certain Magical Index (2008). The opening theme music that aired from episodes 1 to 16 is "No Buts!" by Mami Kawada and was released on November 3, 2010. The first ending theme music that aired from episodes 1 to 13 is "Magic∞World" by Maon Kurosaki and was released on November 24, 2010. The second opening theme music that aired from episodes 17 onwards is "See Visions" by Kawada and was released on February 16, 2011. The second ending theme music that aired from episode 14 onwards is "Memories Last" (メモリーズ・ラスト, Memorīzu・Rasuto) by Kurosaki and was released on March 2, 2011.

== Marketing ==
In September 2010, a 15-second commercial video and two collaborative commercial videos, narrated by Oreimo characters Kirino Kosaka and Kyōsuke Kosaka, for A Certain Magical Index II were released. The series also held collaboration with Maid Sama! In the same month, the edited version of the series' first episode ("August 31st") was screened at Dengeki Bungko Autumn Festival 2010. Abe, Iguchi, Satō, Itō, Taniyama, and producer Nobuhiro Nakayama were also present at the event to promote the series.

== Release ==
=== Broadcast ===
A Certain Magical Index II began airing in Japan on AT-X on October 8, 2010, Tokyo MX on October 9, TVS, CTC, MBS, and tvk on October 10, and on CBC on October 14. The broadcast of episode 47 on all networks were delayed by one week, while the local broadcasts of episodes 46 and 47 on both CBC and MBS were delayed, all due to the impact of the 2011 Tōhoku earthquake and tsunami.

=== Home media ===
Japanese Blu-ray & DVD release
Vol.	Episodes	Release date	Ref.
1	1–3	January 26, 2011	
2	4–6	February 23, 2011	
3	7–9	April 6, 2011	
4	10–12	May 25, 2011	
5	13–15	June 22, 2011	
6	16–18	July 27, 2011	
7	19–21	August 24, 2011	
8	22–24	September 22, 2011	

Geneon Universal Entertainment released eight Blu-ray and DVD volumes of A Certain Magical Index II in Japan starting January 26, 2011. Each volume contains a bonus novel written by Kazuma Kamachi titled A Certain Scientific Railgun SS2: Ability Demonstration Trip. In October 2010, an episode of the bonus anime A Certain Magical Index-tan was announced to be included in the pre-orders of the first volume's limited edition. Funimation released the first Blu-ray and DVD combo set containing the first twelve episodes of the season in North America on October 28, 2014, which was intended to be shipped on October 14 but was delayed due to a "technical issue with the video disc replicator". The second combo set containing the remaining episodes was released on December 16, 2014, while another combo set containing the whole season was released on July 19, 2016. Manga Entertainment released the series' Blu-ray and DVD combo set in the United Kingdom on August 21, 2017.

Nico Nico Douga began streaming the series in Japan on October 14, 2010, after it aired first on television networks. Funimation began streaming the series in North America on January 14, 2014, while Crunchyroll began streaming it on December 24, 2016. Tubi added the series to its catalog for streaming in December 2017. Hulu released the series in Japan on March 24, 2022. Muse Asia began streaming the series on their official YouTube channel on June 6, 2022.

== Reception ==
=== Critical response ===
Theron Martin of Anime News Network graded A Certain Magical Index II 'B−', considering the second season "the weakest series in the franchise". Despite the flaws of the show, such as having "horribly overwritten dialogue[s]", he praised it for advancing the "storylines on both scientific and magical fronts", its action sequences, and giving viewers "opportunities to have fun with characters both old and new". Ian Wolf of Anime UK News scored the series 8 out of 10, calling its action "better" than the first season, while pointing out the "violence" in the show and finding the factions' names ("Roman Orthodox Church" for Roman Catholic Church and "English Puritan Church" for Church of England) "weird".

=== Accolade ===
Okamoto won Best Supporting Actor at the 5th Seiyu Awards for his role as Accelerator.
