= Kimiko Koyama =

Japanese voice actress

- こやま きみこ
- Born: 古山 貴実子 (Kimiko Koyama); January 27, 1979 (age 47); Tokushima City, Tokushima Prefecture, Japan
- Occupations: Voice actress; singer
- Years active: 1997–present
- Height: 152 cm (5 ft 0 in)

Kimiko Koyama (こやま きみこ, Koyama Kimiko; born January 27, 1979) is a Japanese voice actress and singer from Tokushima City, Tokushima Prefecture.

== Filmography ==
=== Anime ===
1997

- Coji-Coji (Piroro)

2001

- Comic Party (Ikumi Tachikawa)
- Chibi Maruko-chan (Natsumi Murata)

2002

- Happy Lesson (Uzuki Shitennō)
- Ground Defense Force! Mao-chan (Mao Onigawara)
- Samurai Deeper Kyo (Ruru)

2003

- Ai Yori Aoshi Enishi (Natsuki Komiya)
- Happy Lesson Advance (Uzuki Shitennō)
- Maburaho (Elizabeth)
- Raimuiro Senkitan (Akaito)

2004

- My-HiMe (Yayoi Ota)

2005

- Koi Koi Seven (Hifumi Inokai)
- Best Student Council (Maachi Hisakawa)
- Comic Party: Revolution (Ikumi Tachikawa)
- Shakugan no Shana (Marianne)
- Zoids: Genesis (Rei Mii)
- My-Otome (Yayoi Ota)
- Negima! Magister Negi Magi (Fūka Narutaki)
- MÄR (Aqua)
- Raimuiro Ryukitan X (Akaito)

2006

- Canvas 2: Niji Iro no Sketch (Yuzu Nanashiro)
- Negima!? (Fūka Narutaki)
- Black Cat (Ellie)
- Makai Senki Disgaea (Maharl)
- Mamoru-kun ni Megami no Shukufuku o! (Yūka Maruyama)
- The Wallflower (Madeleine)
- Yume Tsukai (Wakaba)
- Love Get Chu (Kiyoka Hōjō)
- Rec (Tanaka)

2007

- Kamichama Karin (Suzune Kujō)
- Shakugan no Shana Second (Marianne)
- Shugo Chara! (Pepe)
- Dōjin Work (Sōra Kitano)
- Prism Ark (Litte Ratus)
- Reideen (Kuraka Saiga)

2008

- Corpse Princess: Aka (Hikaru Yodomoe)
- Shugo Chara!! Doki- (Pepe)
- A Certain Magical Index (Komoe Tsukuyomi)
- Nabari no Ou (Jūji Minami)
- Rosario + Vampire (Yukari Sendō)
- Rosario + Vampire Capu2 (Yukari Sendō)

2009

- Asura Cryin' (Reiko Saeki)
- Asura Cryin' 2 (Reiko Saeki)
- Shugo Chara! Party! (Pepe)

2010

- Ōkami-san and Her Seven Companions (Majolica le Fay)
- Shukufuku no Campanella (Carina Verriti)
- A Certain Scientific Railgun (Komoe Tsukuyomi)
- A Certain Magical Index II (Komoe Tsukuyomi)

2011

- Shakugan no Shana Final (Rinko)
- Dream Eater Merry (Parade)

2012

- Is This A Zombie? Of The Dead (Eucliwood Hellscythe (delusion))

2013

- Soreike! Anpanman (Shimejiman)

2014

- Karen Senki (Pinky Pakuchi)

2017

- UQ Holder! (Fūka Narutaki)

2018

- A Certain Magical Index III (Komoe Tsukuyomi)

2019

- Manaria Friends (Roux)

2020

- A Certain Scientific Railgun T (Komoe Tsukuyomi)

=== OVA ===
- Happy Lesson: The Final (Uzuki Shitennō)
- Kujibiki Unbalance (Koyuki Asagiri)
- Negima! Shiroki Tsubasa Ala Alba (Fūka Narutaki)
- Negima! Mō Hitotsu no Sekai (Fūka Narutaki)
- Negima!? OVA Spring (Fūka Narutaki)
- Negima!? OVA Summer (Fūka Narutaki)
- Raimuiro Senkitan: The South Island Dream Romantic Adventure (Akaito)
- Shukufuku no Campanella (Carina Verriti)
- YU-NO: A girl who chants love at the bound of this world (Yu-no)

=== Films ===
- A Certain Magical Index: The Miracle of Endymion (Komoe Tsukuyomi)
- Dōbutsu no Mori (Timmy)
- Negima! Magister Negi Magi: Anime Final (Fūka Narutaki)
- Shakugan no Shana: The Movie (Marianne)
- Smile Pretty Cure!: The Movie (Nico)

=== Drama CD ===
- Haou Airen (Kurumi Akino)

=== Video games ===
- YU-NO: A girl who chants love at the bound of this world (Yu-no)
