= Nozomi Sasaki (voice actress) =

Japanese voice actress

- ささき のぞみ
- Born: February 19, 1983 (age 42); Kanagawa Prefecture, Japan
- Occupation: Voice actress
- Years active: 2006–present
- Agent: Haikyō

Nozomi Sasaki (ささき のぞみ, Sasaki Nozomi; born February 19, 1983) is a Japanese voice actress from Kanagawa Prefecture. She is affiliated with Haikyō.

For her stage name she has adopted the hiragana rendering ささき のぞみ instead of the original kanji representation (佐々木望) of her birth name Nozomi Sasaki. (This combination of kanji characters is also used for rendering the name of Nozomu Sasaki, a male voice actor, and she shares the same name as Nozomi Sasaki, a model, which would be too close.)

== Filmography ==
=== Anime ===
- A Certain Magical Index as Misaka Sisters
- A Certain Magical Index II as Misaka Sisters
- A Certain Magical Index III as Misaka Sisters
- A Certain Scientific Accelerator as Misaka Sisters
- A Certain Scientific Railgun S as Misaka Sisters
- Aokana: Four Rhythm Across the Blue as Mayu Ganeko
- Bokura ga Ita as Nanami Takahashi (debut)
- Durarara!! as Haruko
- Hakushaku to Yōsei as Brownie B (ep 3)
- Hell Girl: Three Vessels as Kaede Inao (ep 9)
- Honto ni Atta! Reibai-Sensei as Chinatsu Akagi
- Idolmaster: Xenoglossia as Suzuna
- Jewelpet as Sapphie/Io
- Jewelpet Kira Deco as Sapphie/Io
- Jewelpet Sunshine as Sapphie/Io
- Jewelpet Twinkle as Sapphie/Io
- Jinrui wa Suitaishimashita as Fairy
- Kimi ni Todoke as Ayako Nonohara
- Kimi ni Todoke 2nd Season as Ayako Nonohara (eps 0–1)
- Kurokami The Animation as Mayu (eps 1–2)
- Lucky Star as Patricia "Patty" Martin
- Lucky Star OVA as Patricia "Patty" Martin
- Les Misérables: Shōjo Cosette as Charlotte
- My-Otome 0~S.ifr~ (OAV) as Kyouko Tsumabuki
- Ojarumaru as Saori; Tsukimi
- Princess Lover! as Ayano Kaneko
- Rinshi!! Ekoda-chan as Mōkin
- Shiki as Ritsuko Kunihiro
- Sora no Manimani as Izumi
- Winter Garden as Aiko
- Yotsunoha (OAV) as Ren
- Yumeiro Pâtissière as Yōko Ayukawa (5 episodes)
- Yumeiro Pâtissière SP Professional as Yōko Ayukawa (eps 62–63)
- Yahari Ore no Seishun Love Come wa Machigatteiru. as Hina Ebina
- Yahari Ore no Seishun Love Come wa Machigatteiru. Zoku as Hina Ebina

=== Video games ===
- Fire Emblem Fates - Felicia, Oboro
- Fire Emblem Warriors - Oboro
- Fire Emblem Heroes - Felicia, Oboro, Sue
- Soul Calibur V - Pyrrha Alexandra
- Brave Sword × Blaze Soul (2015), Mistilteinn
- Aokana: Four Rhythm Across the Blue as Mayu Ganeko
- MeiQ: Labyrinth of Death as Glenn of Fire
- Granblue Fantasy as Danua
- Azur Lane as Eldrige
