= Kotoko discography =

This is the discography of the I've Sound singer Kotoko.

== Albums ==
=== Studio albums ===
Year	Album details	Peak Oricon chart positions	Sales	Certifications (sales thresholds)
2000	Sora o Tobetara...: Released: December 29, 2000; Label: Self-release; Format: CD	—		
2004	Hane: Released: April 24, 2004 / June 20, 2006 (US); Label: Geneon Entertainment Inc.; Format: CD	7	40,000	
2005	Garasu no Kaze: Released: June 8, 2005; Label: Geneon Entertainment Inc.; Format: CD	6	48,000	
2006	Uzu-maki: Released: December 13, 2006; Label: Geneon Entertainment Inc.; Format: CD	16	40,000	
2009	Epsilon no Fune: Released: October 14, 2009; Label: Geneon Entertainment Inc.; Format: CD, CD+DVD	12	15,500	
2011	Hiraku Uchū Pocket: Released: October 5, 2011; Label: Warner Music Japan; Format: CD	21	6,500	
2013	Kūchū Puzzle: Released: November 20, 2013; Label: Warner Music Japan; Format: CD, CD+DVD	19	7,000	
2018	Tears Cyclone: Kai: Released: June 27, 2018; Label: NBCUniversal; Format: CD	29	3,000	
2019	Tears Cyclone: Sei: Released: June 26, 2019; Label: NBCUniversal; Format: CD, CD+Blu-ray disc	26	3,000	

=== Compilation albums ===
Album information	Sales
Kotoko Anime's Compilation Best: Released: December 23, 2009; Oricon top 300 position: #32	9,801
Kotoko's Game Song Complete Box "The Bible": Released: April 21, 2020; Oricon top 300 position: #4	12,262
Kotoko Anime Song's Complete Album "The Fable": Released: November 17, 2020; Oricon top 300 position: #19	3,310
Redecorate Myself: Released: September 13, 2023; Oricon top 300 position: #36	1,161

== Singles ==
Year	Song(s)	Peak Oricon chart position	Total sales	Certification	Album
2001	"Love a Riddle"	—			
2002	"Shooting Star"	62	16,500		
2003	"Second Flight" (with Hiromi Satō)	15	35,000		
2004	"Oboetete ii yo/DuDiDuWa*lalala"	15	19,000		Garasu no Kaze
2004	"Re-sublimity"	8	50,000		Garasu no Kaze
2005	"Chi ni Kaeru (On the Earth)"	19	29,000		
2005	"421: A Will"	16	13,500		Garasu no Kaze
2006	"Face of Fact (Resolution ver.)"	21	14,000		
2006	"Being"	4	35,000		Uzu-maki
2006	"Chercher"	16	17,000		
2007	"Kirei na Senritsu"	18	12,000		
2007	"Hayate no Gotoku!"	7	33,500		Epsilon no Fune
2007	"Shichiten Hakki Shijou Shugi!"	8	28,500		
2007	"Real Onigokko"	15	14,000		Epsilon no Fune
2008	"Blaze"	13	27,000		Epsilon no Fune
2008	"Special Life!"	13	14,500		
2008	"U Make Ai Dream"	46	5,500		
2009	"Snipe"	62	2,000		
2009	"Ao-Iconoclast / Pigeon-The Green-ey'd Monster"	26	7,000		
2009	"Daily-daily Dream"	16	10,500		
2009	"Screw"	24	4,500		
2010	"Hekira no Sora e Izanaedo"	18	7,500		
2010	"Loop-the-Loop"	18	6,500		Kūchū Puzzle
2011	"Light My Fire"	19	11,000		Kūchū Puzzle
2011	"One-Chance!!" (with Hiromi Satō)				
2012	"Unfinished"	14	16,000		Kūchū Puzzle
2012	"Restart"	37	3,000		Kūchū Puzzle
2013	"Kaiki Shinsei: Recurrent Nova" / "Natsukaze Nostalgia" (with Hiromi Satō)	54	2,000		
2014	"Tough Intention"	34	4,000		
2014	"Zone-It"	48	2,000		
2015	"Art As"				
2016	"Plasmic Fire" (with Altima)	19	7,000		
2020	"Stick Out"	28	1,000		
2020	"Sweet x Sweet" / "Negaigoto"				
2021	"Internet Overdose" (with Aiobahn)				
2022	"Fastest"	59	400		
2023	"Internet Yamero" (with Aiobahn)				
2023	"Puzzle"				
2024	"Moon-Rainbow Butterfly" (with Aiobahn)				

== Other album appearances ==
Year	Song(s)	Album	Ref.
2000	"Prime" (with Aki)	Dear Feeling	
2000	"Sora Yori Chikai Yume" (Second Track)	Dear Feeling	
2000	"Ashita no Mukō"	Dear Feeling	
2002	"Namida no Chikai" (Album mix)	Disintegration	
2002	"Flow: Mizu no Umareta Basho"	Disintegration	
2002	"I Can't Get Over Your Best Smile"	Disintegration	
2002	"Resolution of Soul"	Disintegration	
2002	"Wing my Way" (Album mix)	Disintegration	
2002	"Kimi yo, Yasashii Kaze ni Nare"	Disintegration	
2002	"Dirty Boots" (as Outer)	Dirty Gift	
2002	"Ano Hi no Kimi e"	Onegai Teacher 2nd Vocal Album - Stokesia	
2002	"Snow Angel"	Onegai Teacher 2nd Vocal Album - Stokesia	
2002	"Amethyst"	Tsumamix Vocal Collection	
2003	"Face of Fact"	Lament	
2003	"Save Your Heart" (Album mix) (with Kaori Utatsuki)	Lament	
2003	"Kageri" (Album mix)	Lament	
2003	"Feel in tears"	Lament	
2003	"Natsukusa no Senro" (with Kaori Utatsuki)	Lament	
2003	"Lament"	Lament	
2003	"Heart of Hearts"	Outflow	
2003	"Close to me..."	Outflow	
2003	"Sensitive"	Outflow	
2003	"Change My Style: Anata no Konomi no Watashi ni "	Short Circuit	
2003	"Ren'ai Chu!" (Remix) (with Kaori Utatsuki)	Short Circuit	
2003	"Sakuranbo Kiss: Bakuhatsu Damo n"	Short Circuit	
2003	"You're My Treasure" (Remix) (with Aki and Rimikka)	Short Circuit	
2003	"Achichina Natsu no Monogatari"	Short Circuit	
2003	"Magical Sweetie"	Short Circuit	
2003	"Cream+Mint"	Short Circuit	
2003	"Omoide wa Kaze no Naka de..."	Short Circuit	
2003	"Short Circuit"	Short Circuit	
2004	"Namida no Chikai" (the divine pledge of tears)	I've Remix Style Mixed Up	
2004	"Boundary Line"	Silent Half Special CD	
2005	"Abyss"	Collective	
2005	"We Survive"	Collective	
2005	"Lupe"	Collective	
2005	"Imaginary Affair"	Collective	
2005	"Trust You're Truth: Ashita o mamoru yakusoku"	Collective	
2005	"Collective"	Collective	
2006	"Allegretto: Sora to Kimi"	Kono Aozora ni Yakusoku o Special CD	
2007	"Nee, ...Shiyō yo!"	Short Circuit II	
2007	"Seishun Rocket"	Short Circuit II	
2007	"Princess Bride!"	Short Circuit II	
2007	"Atarashii Koi no Katachi" (Short Circuit Edit)	Short Circuit II	
2007	"Mighty Heart: Aru Hi no Kenka, Itsu mo no Koigokoro"	Short Circuit II	
2007	"Hajimemashite, Koi"	Short Circuit II	
2007	"Otomegokoro tasu Nekomimi no Heihōkon wa Mugen" (with Eiko Shimamiya)	Short Circuit II	
2007	"Kyururun Kiss de Jumbo"	Short Circuit II	
2007	"Princess Brave!"	Short Circuit II	
2007	"Maple Syrup"	Short Circuit II	
2007	"Double Harmonize Shock!!" (with Kaori Utatsuki)	Short Circuit II	
2007	"Synthetic Organism" (as Outer)	I've Mania Tracks Vol.1	
2007	"Hallucino" (Remix)	I've Mania Tracks Vol.1	
2007	"Time Heals All Sorrows"	I've Mania Tracks Vol.1	
2007	"L.A.M Laze and Meditation" (2001 P.V Long Arrange Mix) (as Outer)	I've Mania Tracks Vol.1	
2007	"Crossed Destiny"	I've Mania Tracks Vol.1	
2007	"Philosophy" (Proto type Mix)	I've Mania Tracks Vol.1	
2007	"Leave Me Hell Alone" (as Outer)	I've Mania Tracks Vol.1	
2008	"Suppuration -core-" (G.M.S. remix)	Master Groove Circle	
2008	"Real Onigokko" (Ben Watkins from Juno Reactor remix)	Master Groove Circle	
2008	"Re-sublimity" (Shiva Joerg & Hard Stuff remix)	Master Groove Circle	
2008	"Uzu-maki" (Eat Static remix)	Master Groove Circle	
2008	"Kisetsu no Shizuku"	The Front Line Covers	
2008	"Belvedia"	The Front Line Covers	
2009	"Ha!!!ppiness" (as Outer)	I’ve Mania Tracks Vol. II	
2009	"Prime: "Thank you" and "From now""	I’ve Mania Tracks Vol. II	
2009	"Absurd"	I’ve Mania Tracks Vol. II	
2009	"Yakusoku"	I’ve Mania Tracks Vol. II	
2009	"Cave"	I’ve Mania Tracks Vol. II	
2009	"Fatally"	I’ve Mania Tracks Vol. II	
2009	"Seishun Rocket" (Short Circuit II Edit) (with Kaori Utatsuki)	I’ve Mania Tracks Vol. II	
2009	"Akanezora: Sore ga Bokura no Sekai Datta"	Maji de Watashi ni Koi Shinasai! Special CD	
2010	"Blossomdays"	Short Circuit III	
2010	"Raspberry"	Short Circuit III	
2010	"Crash Course: Koi no Tokubetsu Lesson" (with Kaori Utatsuki)	Short Circuit III	
2010	"I need magic: Tokenai Maji Kyun"	Short Circuit III	
2010	"Omamagoto"	Short Circuit III	
2010	"Stars Biscuit"	Short Circuit III	
2010	"Swift Love: Kenzen Danshi ni Monomōsu"	Short Circuit III	
2010	"Lilies line"	Short Circuit III	
2010	"Yumemishi Boom! Boom!"	Short Circuit III	
2010	"Jōshiki! Butler Kōshinkyoku"	Short Circuit III	
2010	"Hoshizora Interceptor" (with Kaori Utatsuki)	Short Circuit III	
2010	"La clef: Meikyū no Kagi"	Extract	
2010	"Restoration: Chinmoku no Sora"	Extract	
2010	"A Piacere"	Extract	
2010	"Oblivion"	Extract	
2010	"Jihad"	Extract	
2010	"Leaf Ticket"	Extract	
2010	"Ketsudan no Entrance"	Extract	
2010	"Onaji Sora no Shita de"	Extract	
2010	"Gensō no Prism"	Extract	
2010	"Hallucino"	Extract	
2010	"Undying Love"	Extract	
2010	"Cross Up"	I've Mania Tracks Vol. III	
2010	"Loose"	I've Mania Tracks Vol. III	
2010	"I Pray to Stop My Cry"	I've Mania Tracks Vol. III	
2010	"Gensō no Prism"	Prism Magical Special CD	
2011	"Fly to the Top"	Tribal Link	
2011	"Immoral"	Tribal Link	
2012	"U Make Ai Dream"	Level Octave	
2012	"Genzai no Requiem" (Album mix)	Level Octave	
2012	"Bloom"	Level Octave	
2012	"Presto"	Level Octave	
2012	"U"	Comic Market CD 83	
2012	"Wing of Zero"	Comic Market CD 83	
2013	"Kirameku Otome"	'Nekoneko Soft' Soshite Kirameku Otome to Himitsu 5 Special CD	
2014	"Wing of Zero"	Evidence Nine	
2014	"Reboot On/↓0"	Evidence Nine	
2014	"Soupir D'Ange"	Evidence Nine	
2014	"Love Mission!!: Nanda. Tada no Koi ka"	Evidence Nine	
2016	"Stardust Train"	The Time: 12 Colors	
2017	"Sign of Suspicion"	Alive	
2017	"Imaginary Affair" (2017 Version)	Alive	
2018	"Erika" (with Tatsh)	War of Brains Original Soundtrack	
2018	"Instincts Answer"	ave;new Concept Mini Album Labyrinthine Nerve	
2022	"INTERNET OVERDOSE" (with Aiobahn)	NEEDY GIRL OVERDOSE official soundtrack	

== Other appearances on albums ==
#	Album information	Sales	Notes
1	SxW EP (mini album) (SxW -Soul World-) (Luna Haruna Second Mini Album): To be release: February 22, 2017; Oricon top 200 position:		The song will be collaborating with Luna Haruna
