= Kotoko Anime Song's Complete Album "The Fable" =

Compilation album by Kotoko
- Released: November 17, 2020
- Genre: J-pop; Anime song
- Length: 2:33:37
- Label: NBCUniversal Entertainment Japan

Kotoko chronology
Kotoko's Game Song Complete Box "The Bible" (2020)	Kotoko Anime Song's Complete Album "The Fable" (2020)	Sweet Cyclone: Yay (2022)

Kotoko Anime Song's Complete Album "The Fable" is a compilation album by Japanese singer-songwriter Kotoko. It was released on November 17, 2020, through NBCUniversal Entertainment Japan.

The album is a three-disc collection featuring all 31 of Kotoko's anime theme songs, spanning her career and crossing multiple record labels. It was released simultaneously with her single “SticK Out,” the ending theme for the TV anime King's Raid: Successors of the Will.

== Background and release ==
The Fable follows Kotoko's earlier compilation, Kotoko's Game Song Complete Box "The Bible", released in April 2020. The album was conceived as part of the celebrations marking the start of Kotoko's 16th year as an artist, following her 15th anniversary in 2019. Unlike her 2009 compilation Kotoko Anime's Compilation Best, which Kotoko noted carried a sense of finality as if she was about to end her music activities upon its release, The Fable was intended to serve as a comprehensive collection of her anime songs, reflecting her confidence in moving forward while honouring her past work. The release aimed to provide newer fans with an accessible entry point to her extensive discography, as collecting her older singles could be challenging.

The compilation includes tracks from various labels, a feat Kotoko described as a significant achievement due to the complexity of securing permissions from multiple companies. She noted that the process was more challenging than for The Bible, but all labels involved granted approval, allowing for a complete representation of her anime song catalog. The album’s release coincided with the 16th anniversary of her hit single “Re-sublimity,” also released on November 17.

Kotoko expressed that the timing of The Fable's release, following her 15th anniversary projects, allowed her to reflect on her past without it feeling like mere nostalgia. She aimed for the compilation to introduce younger fans to her early work while encouraging them to attend her live performances.

== Chart performance ==
The Fable peaked at number 19 on the Oricon Weekly Albums chart, selling 2,411 copies on its first week.

== Track listing ==
All lyrics are written by Kotoko, unless otherwise noted.

The Fable - Disc 1
No.	Title	Lyrics	Music	Arrangement	Length
1.	"Love a Riddle"		Kazuya Takase	Takase	6:34
2.	"I Can't Get Over Your Best Smile"		Takase	Takase	7:13
3.	"Kirei na Senritsu" (きれいな旋律)	Oyuki Konno	Marty Friedman	Tomoyuki Nakazawa; Maiko Iuchi	3:58
4.	"Ano Hi no Kimi e" (あの日の君へ)		Takase	Takase	6:11
5.	"Sweet Songs Ever With You"	Masaki Tsuzuki	Hiroaki Sano	Ayumi Yasui	5:19
6.	"Trust You're Truth: Ashita o Mamoru Yakusoku" (Trust You’re Truth～明日を守る約束～)	Kotoko; Tsuzuki	Takase	Takase	5:25
7.	"Chi ni Kaeru: On the Earth" (地に還る～on the Earth～)		Kotoko	Yoichi Shimada (Sorma No. 1)	5:47
8.	"Snow Angel"		Takase	Takase	4:29
9.	"Shooting Star"		Shinji Orito	Takase	5:23
10.	"Call"		Kon-K	Kon-K	4:29
Total length:					54:48

The Fable - Disc 2
No.	Title	Lyrics	Music	Arrangement	Length
1.	"Re-sublimity"		Takase	Takase	5:19
2.	"Suppuration -core-"		Takase	Takase	5:38
3.	"Zone-It"		Shinya Saito	Saito	4:29
4.	"Face of Fact" (Resolution Ver.)		C.G Mix	C.G Mix	5:00
5.	"Blaze"		Takase	Takase	5:08
6.	"Inside of a Wilderness"	Tsuzuki	Sano	Yasui	4:53
7.	"Sociometry"		C.G Mix	C.G Mix	4:47
8.	"Light My Fire"	Ryo	Ryo	Ryo	3:48
9.	"Unfinished"		Satoshi Yaginuma	Yaginuma	4:42
10.	"Agony"		Nakazawa	Nakazawa	4:23
11.	"Tough Intention"		Ryo Miyata	Miyata	4:30
Total length:					52:37

The Fable - Disc 3
No.	Title	Lyrics	Music	Arrangement	Length
1.	"Being"		Kotoko	Takase	4:50
2.	"Chercher" (Chercher〜シャルシェ〜)	Konno	C.G Mix	C.G Mix	4:40
3.	"Loop-the-Loop"		Kotoko; Nakazawa	Nakazawa; Takeshi Ozaki	4:13
4.	"Mew Mew Cake" (▲MEW▲△MEW△CAKE)		Sky_Delta	Yashikin	3:53
5.	"My Gentle Days"	Tsuzuki	Happy Soulman	Yasui	4:42
6.	"DuDiDuWa*lalala"		Kotoko; Atsuhiko Nakatsubo	Nakatsubo	5:18
7.	"Hayate no Gotoku!" (ハヤテのごとく！)		Takase	Takase	4:27
8.	"Special Life!"		C.G Mix	C.G Mix	4:20
9.	"Daily-daily Dream"		C.G Mix	C.G Mix	5:07
10.	"Shichiten Hakki Shijō Shugi!" (七転八起☆至上主義！)		C.G Mix	C.G Mix	4:42
Total length:					46:12
