= Redecorate Myself =

Compilation album by Kotoko
- Released: September 13, 2023
- Genre: J-pop; Anime song; Denpa song
- Label: NBCUniversal Entertainment Japan

Kotoko chronology
Sweet Cyclone: Yay (2022)	Redecorate Myself (2023)

Redecorate Myself (リデコレイト・マイセルフ) is a compilation album by Japanese singer-songwriter Kotoko. It was released on September 13, 2023, through NBCUniversal Entertainment Japan.

It is a double-disc album to commemorate her 20th anniversary since Kotoko's major debut in 2004, and it features re-arranged versions of her iconic songs and self-covers of tracks she originally wrote for other artists. It serves as a retrospective of her career while showcasing new arrangements tailored to both long-time fans and newer audiences. The title, meaning "redecorate" or "remake oneself," reflects Kotoko's intent to revisit and reimagine her musical legacy.

== Background and release ==
Kotoko, who debuted on in 2004 with the album Hane under Geneon Entertainment (now NBC Universal), began planning Redecorate Myself around her 15th anniversary in 2019. The concept emerged from discussions with her team, including producer Jun Nishimura, to mark her 20th anniversary. Initially, Kotoko envisioned an album of self-covers of songs she had written for others. However, the project evolved to include re-arranged versions of her own popular tracks, combining two key elements: her signature songs and covers of her compositions originally performed by other artists.

The album aimed to bridge Kotoko's extensive catalog with modern music consumption trends, such as streaming platforms, to reach both dedicated fans and newer listeners. The tracklist was curated using fan surveys and streaming platform viral charts to balance nostalgia with contemporary appeal. The album is structured as a two-disc set: the first disc focuses on her anime-related songs, while the second disc highlights her denpa songs.

Redecorate Myself features re-arrangements by various producers, deliberately chosen to differ from the original arrangers to offer fresh perspectives. Kotoko personally selected collaborators based on their musical styles, aiming to contrast or complement the original arrangements. Notable contributors included Tomoyuki Nakazawa, who re-arranged iconic tracks like "Re-sublimity" and "being.". Kotoko expressed trust in Nakazawa's ability to deliver exceptional results despite the pressure of reworking these beloved songs; Kazuya Takase, who handled "radiance" and "Light My Fire," overcoming initial hesitation to create arrangements that met Kotoko's expectations; Shinya Saito was tasked with re-arranging "Shooting Star" and "Went Away," and he blended the songs' original charm with modern, grandiose elements, reflecting his long-standing collaboration with Kotoko; IOSYS, a Hokkaido-based group, contributed to the denpa songs on Disc 2, with team members enthusiastically competing to work on specific tracks; Solfa's Toru Hashisaki, who re-arranged "Pure Heart ~Sekai de Ichiban Anata ga Suki~," transformed its original chiptune-style into a stylish, modern rendition. The re-arrangements were a collaborative effort, with Kotoko and her team meticulously recreating parts of songs, often relying on ear-copying due to the absence of sheet music. This process uncovered forgotten elements, such as vocal parts in "421-a will-," which were reinstated during recording to preserve the emotional depth of the originals.

Highlights on the album include "Shooting Star", Kotoko's breakout 2002 hit, which was re-recorded to showcase her improved vocal technique while maintaining its original essence. "Re-sublimity" and "Being" were re-arranged by Tomoyuki Nakazawa; these songs carry significant emotional weight for Kotoko and were approached with care to honor their legacy; "Pure Heart ~Sekai de Ichiban Anata ga Suki~" was a song originally written by Kotoko for Aki (former I've Sound vocalist) as her first professional work as a lyricist. Kotoko's second major single "421-a will-" was also re-arranged with a grand, warm tone to symbolize her journey toward her 20th anniversary. Lastly, as a bonus track, the album also includes the song "Internet Yamero", Kotoko's second collaboration with Aiobahn and a follow-up to "Internet Overdose," which gained significant popularity on platforms like TikTok, introducing Kotoko to a younger audience unfamiliar with her gaming and anime roots.

== Chart performance ==
Redecorate Myself peaked at number 36 on the Oricon Weekly Album charts, selling 1,161 copies on its first week.

== Track listing ==
All lyrics are written by Kotoko, unless otherwise noted.

Redecorate Myself - Disc 1
No.	Title	Lyrics	Music	Arrangement	Length
1.	"Shooting Star" (Redecorate ver.)		Shinji Orito	Shinya Saito	4:51
2.	"Re-sublimity" (Redecorate ver.)		Kazuya Takase	Tomoyuki Nakazawa	5:29
3.	"Went Away" (Redecorate ver.)		Takase	Saito	6:03
4.	"Radiance" (Redecorate ver.)	Kotoko; Mami Kawada	Nakazawa	Takase	4:50
5.	"Pure Heart: Sekai de Ichiban Anata ga Suki" (Pure Heart ～世界で一番アナタが好き～) (Redecorate ver.)		Takase	Toru Hashizaki	4:56
6.	"Unfinished" (Redecorate ver.)		Satoshi Yaginuma	Yūya Kobayashi	4:22
7.	"Shichiten Hakki Shijō Shugi!" (七転八起☆至上主義!) (Redecorate ver.)		C.G Mix	Maiko Iuchi	4:17
8.	"Light My Fire" (Redecorate ver.)	Ryo	Ryo	Takase	4:12
9.	"Being" (Redecorate ver.)		Kotoko	Nakazawa	4:51
10.	"421: A Will" (Redecorate ver.)		Nakazawa	Uno	4:24

Redecorate Myself - Disc 2
No.	Title	Lyrics	Music	Arrangement	Length
1.	"Ren'ai Chu!" (恋愛CHU!) (Redecorate ver. (Note: The "Redecorate ver." subtitles on the tracks of Disc 2 are actually written in hiragana (りでこれいとばーじょん: Ridekoreito Bājon)., as opposed to Disc 1 where the subtitles are romanized.))		Nakazawa	Nami	4:28
2.	"Princess Bride!" (Redecorate ver.)	Akuta Utsuro	Kotoko	D.watt	4:02
3.	"Mighty Heart: Aru Hi no Kenka, Itsu mo no Koigokoro" (Mighty Heart ～ある日のケンカ、いつもの恋心～) (Redecorate ver.)		Kotoko, Nakazawa	C.G Mix	4:48
4.	"Change My Stile: Anata Konomi no Watashi ni" (Change my Style 〜あなた好みの私に〜)		Kotoko	Iuchi	4:47
5.	"Short Circuit"		Takase	Hashizaki	4:38
6.	"Ne, ... Shiyō yo!" (ねぇ、…しようよ!) (Redecorate ver.)		Nakazawa	Kobayashi	2:59
7.	"Kyururun Kiss de Jumbo" (きゅるるんKissでジャンボ♪♪) (Redecorate ver.)		C.G Mix	Shinji Suzuki	4:33
8.	"Maple Syrup" (めぃぷるシロップ) (Redecorate ver.)		C.G Mix	Nami	5:06
9.	"Jōshiki! Butler Kōshinkyoku" (常識!バトラー行進曲) (Redecorate ver.)		Iuchi	C.G Mix	3:55
10.	"Seishun Rocket" (↑青春ロケット↑) (Redecorate ver.)		Iuchi	Ryo Deguchi	4:24
11.	"Internet Yamero" (Bonus track)	Nyarura	Aiobahn	Aiobahn	4:05
