= Kotoko's Game Song Complete Box "The Bible" =

Box set by Kotoko
- Released: April 21, 2020
- Recorded: 2000–2020
- Studio: Various
- Genre: J-pop; Video game music
- Length: 9:42:00
- Label: NBCUniversal Entertainment Japan
- Producer: Various

Kotoko chronology
Tears Cyclone: Sei (2019)	Kotoko's Game Song Complete Box "The Bible" (2020)	Kotoko Anime Song's Complete Album "The Fable" (2020)

Kotoko's Game Song Complete Box "The Bible" (partly stylized in all caps) is a box set by Japanese singer Kotoko, released on April 21, 2020, by NBCUniversal Entertainment Japan.

The Bible is a ten-disc box set containing over 130 songs, compiling nearly all of her contributions to video game soundtracks from her singing debut in December 2000, to tracks recorded up to 2020. The box set serves as a comprehensive retrospective of Kotoko's nineteen-year career in the game music industry, coinciding with the fifteenth anniversary of her major debut on April 21, 2004.

== Background and release ==
Kotoko's major debut anniversary activities began with the release of her album Tears Cyclone: Kai and a nationwide tour, followed by festival appearances and a New Year's Eve countdown live. The compilation was conceived as the capstone of these celebrations, gathering songs from her pre-major indie era with I've Sound to her independent works post-2011. Kotoko aimed the box set at both longtime supporters, for whom it acts as a "monument" to their shared history, and newer fans encountering her via live performances to facilitate access to obscure tracks. The tracks were remastered for uniform sound quality but left unremixed, preserving original vocal performances, including "raw and unpolished" early efforts. Notable inclusions are the original game version of "Kageri" from 2002, previously unavailable outside the original game release.

The ten discs are arranged chronologically, covering Kotoko's evolution from independent game vocals to major releases and collaborations with developers like Saga Planets, Giga, PrincessSoft, among others. The first discs focus on her I've Sound era, including her debut song "Close to Me...". Later discs incorporate pop and rock influences from her solo career. The album also highlights Kotoko's role in the early-2000s denpa song movement, featuring pioneering tracks like "Change My Style: Anata Konomi no Watashi ni" (2002), and "Sakuranbo Kiss!" (2003).

The box set was released in three editions: a limited edition with ten CDs and a Blu-ray disc, a regular 10-CD edition, and an Aniversal limited edition including an original T-shirt. The Blu-ray features live footage from Kotoko's "Fifteen Tales" tour in Taipei and a special interview. Additionally, the packaging includes a 156-page lyrics booklet with artwork by UMIKo, Political Sensei Kikuchi, and Tenane Koibizumi, and notes that some titles differ from prior publications per artistic intent.

== Chart performance ==
On its first week of release, Kotoko's Game Song Complete Box "The Bible" peaked at number four on the Oricon weekly album charts with 10,064 copies sold, becoming Kotoko's first Top 5 entry on this chart since her debut. It charted for a total of 8 weeks, with cumulative sales of 12,262 copies.

On Billboard Japan, the box set peaked at number 4 on the Top Albums Sales Chart.

== Track listing ==
All lyrics written by Kotoko, unless otherwise noted.

Disc 1
No.	Title	Lyrics	Music	Arrangement	Length
1.	"Close to Me…"		Kazuya Takase	Takase	5:31
2.	"Namida no Chikai" (涙の誓い)	Takase	Takase	Takase	6:16
3.	"Sensitive"		Takase	Takase	4:57
4.	"Omoide wa Kaze no Naka de..." (想い出は風の中で…)		Takase	Atsuhiko Nakatsubo	3:58
5.	"Time Heals All Sorrows"		Takase	Takase	6:10
6.	"Flow: Mizu no Umareta Basho" (Flow 〜水の生まれた場所〜)		Tomoyuki Nakazawa	Nakazawa	6:08
7.	"Ya Ku So Ku" (YA・KU・SO・KU)		Takase	Takase	5:13
8.	"Magical Sweetie"		Takase	Nakazawa	5:21
9.	"Mirabilis"		Takase	Takase	5:13
10.	"I Pray To Stop My Cry"		Takase	Takase	5:28
11.	"Kimi yo, Yasashii Kaze ni Nare" (君よ、優しい風になれ)	Maki Tsuzuki	Takase	Takase	5:04
12.	"Feel in Tears"		Takase	Takase	4:45
13.	"Heart of Hearts"		Takase	Takase	5:43

Disc 2
No.	Title	Lyrics	Music	Arrangement	Length
1.	"Resolution of Soul"		Takase	Takase	5:58
2.	"Kageri" (遮光 〜かげり〜)		Nakazawa	Nakazawa	4:59
3.	"Onaji Sora no Shita de" (同じ空の下で)	Momo; Takase	Takase	Takase	5:25
4.	"Cave"		Takase	Nakazawa	4:57
5.	"Now and Heaven" (Kotoko ver.)	Takase	Takase	Nakatsubo	6:36
6.	"Change my Style: Anata Konomi no Watashi ni" (Change my Style 〜あなた好みの私に〜)		Kotoko	Takase	4:56
7.	"Achichi na Natsu no Monogatari" (あちちな夏の物語り)		Takase	Takase	4:48
8.	"Went Away"		Takase	Takase	6:50
9.	"Bright Wings" (Solo ver.)	Maki Tsuzuki	Happy Soul Man	Ayumi Yasui	5:48
10.	"Wing my Way"		Takase	Takase	5:58
11.	"Crossed Destiny"		Shade	Takase; Nakazawa	6:32
12.	"Time Rolls On..."		Takase	Nakatsubo	5:10

Disc 3
No.	Title	Lyrics	Music	Arrangement	Length
1.	"Face of Fact"		C.G Mix	C.G Mix; Nakatsubo	5:53
2.	"I-Doll: Song For Eternity"		Takase	Takase	5:02
3.	"Amethyst"		C.G Mix	C.G Mix	5:38
4.	"Just As Time is Running Out"		C.G Mix	C.G Mix	4:54
5.	"Unsymmetry"		C.G Mix	C.G Mix	6:53
6.	"Undying Love"	Kai	F-Ace	Takase	5:25
7.	"Zutto Soba ni…" (ずっとそばに...)	Kai	F-Ace	Takase	4:54
8.	"Sakuranbo Kiss: Bakuhatsu da mo~n" (さくらんぼキッス 〜爆発だも〜ん〜)		C.G Mix	C.G Mix	4:25
9.	"Cream+Mint"		C.G Mix	C.G Mix	4:13
10.	"Hallucino"		Nakazawa	Nakazawa	5:39
11.	"Rime"		C.G Mix	C.G Mix	5:06
12.	"Do You Feel Loved?"		Wata	Wata	5:58
13.	"Lupe"		Nakatsubo	Nakatsubo	5:02

Disc 4
No.	Title	Lyrics	Music	Arrangement	Length
1.	"Hajimemashite, Koi" (はじめまして、恋。)		Takase	Takase	4:26
2.	"Kyururun Kiss de Jumbo" (きゅるるんKissでジャンボ♪♪)		C.G Mix	C.G Mix	4:31
3.	"Jumping Note"		Wata	Wata	4:34
4.	"Absurd"		C.G Mix	C.G Mix	3:50
5.	"Boundary Line"	Kishou Ichiyanagi	Ichiyanagi	I've	2:51
6.	"Abyss"	Masaki Motonaga	Takase	Takase	4:56
7.	"We Survive"		C.G Mix	C.G Mix	4:45
8.	"Oblivion"		C.G Mix	C.G Mix	5:23
9.	"Princess Bride!"	Akuta Utsuro	Kotoko	Sorma	4:04
10.	"Ne, ... Shiyō yo!" (ねぇ、…しようよ!)		Nakazawa	Nakazawa	3:23
11.	"Raspberry" (らずべりー)		C.G Mix	C.G Mix	3:55
12.	"Cross Up"		Nakatsubo	Nakatsubo	5:08
13.	"Sledgehammer Romance"	Motonaga	Kotoko	Sorma	4:16
14.	"Imaginary Affair"		Takase	Takase	4:50

Disc 5
No.	Title	Lyrics	Music	Arrangement	Length
1.	"Allegretto: Sora to Kimi" (Allegretto 〜そらときみ〜)		C.G Mix	C.G Mix	5:25
2.	"Omamagoto" (お*ま*ま*ご*と)		C.G Mix	C.G Mix	3:40
3.	"Fusion Star"		C.G Mix	C.G Mix	4:57
4.	"Mighty Heart: Aru Hi no Kenka, Itsu mo no Koigokoro" (Mighty Heart 〜ある日のケンカ、いつもの恋心〜)		Kotoko	Miu Uetsu	4:36
5.	"Wind of Memory: Kioku no Kaze" (Wind of Memory 〜記憶の風〜)		Wata	Wata	5:50
6.	"Fatally"		C.G Mix	C.G Mix	4:07
7.	"Leaf Ticket"		C.G Mix	C.G Mix	4:57
8.	"Loose"		Takase	Nakatsubo	5:45
9.	"Genzai No Requiem" (原罪のレクイエム)		C.G Mix	C.G Mix	5:04
10.	"A Piacere"		Takase	Takase	5:52
11.	"Lilies Line"		C.G Mix	C.G Mix	5:30
12.	"Princess Brave!"	Utsuro	Nakazawa	Nakazawa; Takeshi Ozaki	5:58
13.	"Seishun Rocket" (↑青春ロケット↑)		Maiko Iuchi	Iuchi, Rich	5:02

Disc 6
No.	Title	Music	Arrangement	Length
1.	"Jōshiki! Butler Kōshinkyoku" (常識!バトラー行進曲)	Iuchi	Iuchi	3:53
2.	"I Need Magic: Tokenai Maji Kyun" (I Need Magic 〜解けないマジ☆キュン♪〜)	C.G Mix	C.G Mix	4:45
3.	"Swift Love: Kenzen Danshi ni Mono Mōsu" (Swift Love 〜健全男子にモノ申す〜)	Iuchi	Iuchi	4:09
4.	"Ketsudan no Entrance" (決断のentrance)	C.G Mix	C.G Mix	6:10
5.	"Ideal Forest"	Takase	Takase	5:34
6.	"Ao-Iconoclast" (蒼-iconoclast)	Yūgo Sasakura	Ayumi Miyazaki	4:56
7.	"Akanezora ～Sore ga Bokura no Sekai Datta～" (茜空 〜それが僕らの世界だった〜)	C.G Mix	C.G Mix	5:19
8.	"U Make Ai Dream" (U make 愛 dream)	Kotoko; Takase	Takase	5:04
9.	"Yumemiboshi Boom! Boom!" (ユメミボシ★boom!boom!)	Nakazawa	Nakazawa, Ozaki	4:08
10.	"Stars Biscuit"	Iuchi	Iuchi	4:49
11.	"Restoration: Chinmoku no Sora" (Restoration 〜沈黙の空〜)	C.G Mix	C.G Mix	5:11
12.	"Room"	C.G Mix	C.G Mix	5:23
13.	"Fickle"	Iuchi	Iuchi	3:59
14.	"Bumpy-Jumpy!"	Nakazawa; Ozaki	Nakazawa; Ozaki	3:38

Disc 7
No.	Title	Lyrics	Music	Arrangement	Length
1.	"Thyme"		Fuga Hatori	Hatori	5:21
2.	"Mirai Jigazō" (未来自画像)		C.G Mix	C.G Mix	4:52
3.	"Gensō no Prism" (幻想の宝石)		C.G Mix	C.G Mix; Takeshi Hoshino	4:33
4.	"Miracle Milky Way" (みらくる☆みるきーうぇい)		C.G Mix	C.G Mix	3:59
5.	"Mimosa"		C.G Mix	C.G Mix	5:50
6.	"Hekira no Sora e Izanaedo" (碧羅の天へ誘えど)		C.G Mix	C.G Mix	4:07
7.	"Blossomdays"	Shifumi Matsushima	C.G Mix	C.G Mix	4:13
8.	"Jihad"		C.G Mix	C.G Mix, Ozaki	4:46
9.	"Pray's Color -Link-"	Kai	Tomohiro Takeshita	Takeshita	5:15
10.	"Pray's Color -Lost-"	Kai	Takeshita	Takeshita	5:50
11.	"*Bloom*"		Iuchi	Iuchi	4:31
12.	"Crystal Moment"		C.G Mix	C.G Mix	4:56
13.	"Presto"		Nakazawa; Ozaki	Nakazawa; Ozaki	4:28

Disc 8
No.	Title	Lyrics	Music	Arrangement	Length
1.	"Unite+ReactioN"		Daisuke Kikuta	Kikuta	4:52
2.	"Flower!!"		Toru Hashizaki	Hashizaki	3:44
3.	"Sakura Mau Saki wo, Kimi to Aruku" (桜舞う坂を、君と歩く)	Tohya Okano	Masato Nakayama	Nakayama	3:44
4.	"Love Mission!!: Nanda. Tada no Koi ka w" (Love mission!! 〜なんだ。ただの恋かw〜)		C.G Mix	C.G Mix; Ozaki	5:27
5.	"Floating Up"		Kikuta	Kikuta	4:47
6.	"Asagao" (あさがお)		Tomonori Taguchi	Taguchi	4:23
7.	"U"		Kikuta	Kikuta	4:20
8.	"Teller of World"		Shinji Orito	Shinya Saito	5:40
9.	"Soupir D'Ange"		Iuchi	Iuchi	4:48
10.	"Monochrome"		C.G Mix	C.G Mix	4:33
11.	"Largo"		Kotoko	C.G Mix	5:26
12.	"Restart"		Kotoko	Iuchi	5:16
13.	"Wing of Zero"		Takase	Takase	4:31

Disc 9
No.	Title	Lyrics	Music	Arrangement	Length
1.	"Blooming!!"		Hashizaki	Hashizaki	4:09
2.	"Art as ♥"		Junpei Fujita	Fujita	3:20
3.	"Koi Kō Enishi" (恋ひ恋ふ縁)		Famishin	Satoru Inohara	3:59
4.	"Fancy Game!?"		Hashizaki	Hashizaki	4:32
5.	"Yurafuwa Sunny Day" (ゆらふわ Sunny day)		Atsushi Nido; Karin Tomonaga	Nido, omonaga	5:08
6.	"Ruin"		Jetset	Jetset	4:08
7.	"Koisuru Mori no Fairy Tale" (恋する森のfairy tale)		Akito Matsuda	Matsuda	5:07
8.	"Kirameku Otome" (きらめく乙女)	Tomo Kataoka; Kotoko	C.G Mix	C.G Mix	4:12
9.	"Sono Heart, Kikenbutsu Nitsuki Toriatsukai Chūi!!" (そのハート、危険物につき取り扱いChu♥意!!)		Kenji Arai	Arai	4:58
10.	"Reboot oN/↓0"		C.G Mix	C.G Mix	4:25
11.	"Affection"		Hashizaki	Hashizaki	4:07
12.	"Sign of Suspicion"		Takase	Takase	4:42
13.	"True-Blue"		C.G Mix	C.G Mix	4:24
14.	"Adolescence Locator"		C.G Mix	C.G Mix	3:48
15.	"Bum-Out!!"		Hashizaki	Hashizaki	4:21

Disc 10
No.	Title	Lyrics	Music	Arrangement	Length
1.	"Die or Dice?"		Saito	Saito	4:37
2.	"XXX-Revolt" (Void feat. Kotoko)		Void	Void	5:11
3.	"Sakura Hitohira Koi Moyō" (桜ひとひら恋もよう; Solfa feat. Kotoko)		Iyuna	Iyuna	5:06
4.	"One Small Step"	Mami Kawada	Nakazawa; Kawada	Nakazawa	4:27
5.	"Erica" (エリカ; Tatsh feat. Kotoko)		Tatsh	Tatsh	4:20
6.	"Gekka Ryūshin" (月下流進)		Hironori Aoki	Aoki	4:32
7.	"Instinct's Answer" (Ave;new feat. Kotoko)	a.k.a.dRESS	a.k.a.dRESS	a.k.a.dRESS	4:13
8.	"Refocus"		Kikuta	Kikuta	4:02
9.	"Shinryoku no Utopia" (新緑のユートピア)		Satoshi Yaginuma	Yaginuma	5:33
10.	"Underworld Holography" (L.E.D. feat. Kotoko)	Nana Takahashi	L.E.D.	L.E.D.	4:25
11.	"All Right!!"	Ume Akatsuki	Offshore	Yohei Sugita	3:49
12.	"Real-Reality"		C.G Mix	C.G Mix	4:26
13.	"Aonatsu Line" (アオナツライン)		Ebi Curry Hakushaku; Umigame	Ebi Curry Hakushaku; Umigame	4:06
14.	"Kotodama" (言弾 -KOTODAMA-)		C.G Mix	C.G Mix	3:31
