= Sweet Cyclone: Yay =

- Digital and standard edition cover

Studio album by Kotoko
- Released: June 22, 2022
- Genre: J-pop; Denpa song
- Label: NBCUniversal Entertainment Japan

Kotoko chronology
Kotoko Anime Song's Complete Album "The Fable" (2020)	Sweet Cyclone: Yay (2022)	Redecorate Myself (2023)

Sweet Cyclone: Yay (すぅぃ～とさいくろん-☆いぇいっ☆-) is the ninth studio album by Japanese singer-songwriter Kotoko. It was released on June 22, 2022, through NBCUniversal Entertainment Japan.

This album marks a significant return to the denpa song genre, a style of music characterized by its quirky, energetic, and often whimsical soundscapes that gained prominence in the early 2000s, particularly within the PC game music scene. The album serves as a spiritual successor to Short Circuit, a seminal denpa compilation album series released by the Hokkaido-based music collective I've during Kotoko's tenure with them. The album blends nostalgic elements with modern influences, featuring collaborations with both veteran I've composers and new-generation artists to reintroduce and redefine denpa music for contemporary audiences."

== Background and release ==
Kotoko, a pioneering figure in the denpa song genre, first rose to prominence in the early 2000s as a vocalist for I’ve, contributing iconic tracks like "Sakuranbo Kiss ~Bakuhatsu da mo~n~" to the PC game music scene. Denpa songs, known for their high-energy BPM, playful and surreal lyrics, and a mix of cute, humorous, and slightly risqué themes, became a cultural phenomenon, particularly among fans of visual novels and anime. After leaving I've in 2011, Kotoko had fewer opportunities to produce denpa music in album form, though she continued to perform denpa songs live. The idea for Sweet Cyclone had been in development for over a decade, driven by Kotoko's desire to create a definitive denpa album under her own name, akin to Short Circuit. Performances at a series of concerts during 2015-2016 under the Categorize Live series (branded as Candy Rabbit to highlight cute and denpa songs) demonstrated ongoing fan demand, gradually convincing her team of the genre’s viability. The album’s creation was further catalyzed by the viral success of "Internet Overdose", a collaboration with Aiobahn for the game Needy Girl Overdose, which reaffirmed denpa songs' relevance in the modern era. Kotoko saw Sweet Cyclone as an opportunity to both preserve the genre’s legacy and introduce it to younger audiences, ensuring it wouldn’t “dilute and fade” as a niche subculture. The album also serves as a response to the challenging social climate of the early 2020s, including the COVID-19 pandemic and global unrest, with Kotoko aiming to deliver music that liberates and uplifts listeners through its playful, carefree spirit.

Sweet Cyclone is a celebration of denpa music’s core characteristics: high-energy rhythms, eccentric and humorous lyrics, and a blend of cute, absurd, and slightly provocative themes. Kotoko described denpa as music with a “screw-loose” mentality, where the lyrical world is delightfully bizarre, often incorporating playful interjections, spoken lines, and a sense of “good-natured silliness.” The album juxtaposes this lighthearted absurdity with a serious creative intent, aiming to both honor the genre’s roots and push its boundaries by incorporating diverse musical styles.

The album’s title is a playful nod to Kotoko's previous studio albums, Tears Cyclone: Kai and Tears Cyclone: Sei, but reimagined as a “parody version” with a deliberately exaggerated, comedic tone.

== Chart performance ==
Sweet Cyclone: Yay peaked at number 29 on the Oricon Weekly Albums chart, selling 1,894 copies on its first week.

== Track listing ==
No.	Title	Lyrics	Music	Arrangement	Length
1.	"Sakuranbo Kiss ~Bakuhatsu da mo~n~" (さくらんぼキッス ～爆発だも～ん～) (2022 mix)	Kotoko	C.G Mix	Kazuya Takase	4:52
2.	"Alice in Joker?!"	Kotoko	Maiko Iuchi	Iuchi	4:18
3.	"Viking no Gyakushū" (バイきんぐの逆襲)	Kotoko	Iuchi	Iuchi	3:40
4.	"Sumaho no Koibito: Datte Oshi ga Tsuyosugiru Kara Zutto Kamitte Itteru" (スマホの恋人～だって推しが強すぎるからずっと神って言ってる～)	Kotoko	Rish	Rish	4:46
5.	"Internet Overdose"	Nyarura	Aiobahn	Aiobahn	5:34
6.	"Sakura Mau Ranshin * Iroha Uta" (桜舞乱心*いろは詩)	Kotoko	Katsuyuki Harada	Harada	4:56
7.	"Ojisan to Marshmallow" (おじさんとマシュマロ)	Kotoko	Aiobahn	Aiobahn	5:19
8.	"Miko Miko Nurse / Ai no Theme -Kotton Challenge Version-" (巫女みこナース・愛のテーマ -こっとんちゃれんじばーじょん-)	Loser Kashiwagi	Kashiwagi	Nakazawa	5:04
9.	"Happy Lucky Vegita Boy" (ハピラキ☆ベジタボーイ)	Kotoko	Toru Hashizaki	Hashizaki	4:08
10.	"Taco desu ka?" (タコですよ?)	Kotoko	D.watt	D.watt	4:24
11.	"Live House no Tenki Yōhō" (ライブハウスの天気予報)	Haruko Momoi	Momoi	Haraddy	4:04
12.	"Sweet Cyclone: Yay" (すぅぃ～とさいくろん-☆いぇいっ☆-)	Kotoko	Kotoko	C.G Mix	4:56
