= Blaze (song) =

"BLAZE"

Single by Kotoko

from the album Epsilon no Fune
- B-side: "Sociometry"
- Released: March 12, 2008
- Genre: J-pop, electronic dance
- Length: 19:43
- Label: Geneon
- Songwriters: Kazuya Takase, Kotoko
- Producer: I've Sound

Kotoko singles chronology
| "Real Onigokko" (2007) | "BLAZE" (2008) | "Special Life!" (2008) |

"Blaze" is Kotoko's eleventh maxi single produced by I've Sound under the Geneon Entertainment label. The single was released on March 12, 2008. The title track was used as the second introductory theme for the anime series Shakugan no Shana Second, starting with episode 16 which was broadcast on January 31, 2008. The B-side, "Sociometry", was used as the ending theme for Shakugan no Shana Second. This is Kotoko's second tie-in with the anime series after her "Being" single.

The CD's catalog number is GNCV-0002 (for the regular edition) and GNCV-0001 (for the special edition, which adds a DVD containing the promotional video of the title track).

== Track listing ==
1. "Blaze"—5:06
  Composition: Kazuya Takase
  Arrangement: Kazuya Takase
  Lyrics: Kotoko
2. "Sociometry"—4:47
  Composition: C.G mix
  Arrangement: C.G mix
  Lyrics: Kotoko
3. "BLAZE" (instrumental) -- 5:06
4. "Sociometry" (instrumental) -- 4:44

== Charts and sales ==
| Oricon Ranking (Weekly) | Sales |
|---|---|
| 13 | 26,813 |
