= Kūchū Puzzle =

Studio album by Kotoko
- Released: November 20, 2013
- Genres: J-pop, Anime song
- Labels: Warner Music Japan

Kotoko chronology
Hiraku Uchū Pocket (2011)	Kūchū Puzzle (2013)	Tears Cyclone: Kai (2018)

Kūchū Puzzle (空中パズル) is the sixth studio album by Japanese singer-songwriter Kotoko. It was released on November 20, 2013, through Warner Music Japan. This album, marking her first original release in two years, was also her last record to be released under Warner Music.

== Background and release ==
Kotoko, who debuted in 2004, has built a strong reputation in the anime music industry, contributing to numerous anime and game soundtracks. Since joining Warner Music Japan, notable works include "Light My Fire", used as opening theme for Shakugan no Shana III Final, and "Unfinished", used as ending theme for Accel World. Kūchū Puzzle, as her second studio album with Warner Music Japan, continues this path, as it includes contributions from well-known music creators who have previously worked with Kotoko, including Kazuya Takase (I've Sound), Satoshi Yaginuma (fripSide), Shinya Saito, Maiko Iuchi, and Deco*27, who bring a mix of electronic, pop, and anime-inspired sounds, consistent with Kotoko's signature style.

Kotoko described the album as a concentrated reflection of her inspirations, crafted with a sense of freshness and bold imagination. The conceptualization for Kūchū Puzzle began a year prior to its release, with Kotoko actively shaping the album's direction, though the intensive production process took place over approximately two months. She envisioned the album as a puzzle, piecing together contributions from creators she respected from both her I've era and her subsequent independent career. The album builds on the variety of her previous work, Hiraku Uchū Pocket, but condenses it into a richer, more cohesive sound. Kotoko described the process as a collaborative effort where she actively communicated her ideas, resulting in a work that feels distinctly her own while showcasing the unique styles of each contributor. Most recording sessions took place at Geimori Studio in Hokkaido, where the relaxed atmosphere and scenic autumn surroundings fostered creativity. Kotoko playfully acted as a tour guide, introducing collaborators to local cuisine like ramen and soup curry, enhancing the camaraderie during production.

The album was preceded by the singles "Loop-the-Loop", "Light My Fire", "Unfinished", and "Restart". A highlight of the album is the inclusion of "Shoot!", a song originally written by Kotoko for the voice actor unit Ro-Kyu-Bu!. She previously performed a self-cover of the song live at Animax Music at Yokohama Arena in 2012, and this marks its first official CD release.

Kūchū Puzzle was released in two editions: the CD-only regular edition and the CD+DVD limited edition. The limited edition DVD includes the music video of the song "My-Les", plus behind-the-scene footage from Kotoko's Asia Tour. Purchasers of first-press editions of the album received a bonus CD featuring an English version of "Unfinished", the ending theme for the anime Accel World. The English lyrics were written by Motsu of Altima, who also contributed the Accel World opening theme "Burst The Gravity."

== Chart performance ==
Kūchū Puzzle peaked at number 19 on the Oricon Weekly Album charts, selling 5,596 copies on its first week.

== Track listing ==
All lyrics written by Kotoko, unless otherwise noted.

Kūchū Puzzle - CD
No.	Title	Lyrics	Music	Arrangement	Length
1.	"My-Les"		Shinya Saito	Saito	4:26
2.	"Wing of Zero -The Ring-"		Takase	Takase	5:15
3.	"Kūchū Puzzle" (空中パズル)		Kotoko	Saito	4:47
4.	"Frozen Fir Tree"		Satoshi Yaginuma	Yaginuma	5:35
5.	"Light My Fire"	Ryo (Supercell)	Ryo	Ryo	3:47
6.	"Damare yo, Peter" (黙れよ、ピーター)		Deco*27	Deco*27	3:57
7.	"Shoot!" (Kotoko ver.)		Yaginuma	Saito	5:04
8.	"Fushi-Gino-Ana" (フシ-ギノ-アナ)		Maiko Iuchi	Iuchi	4:26
9.	"Rock De Fruit Basket" (Rock☆DE フルーツバスケット♪)		Kotoko	Toru Hashizaki	4:37
10.	"Sakura no Ame Moegi no yo" (サクラノアメモエギノヨ)		Saito	Saito	5:07
11.	"Loop-the-Loop"		Kotoko; Tomoyuki Nakazawa	Nakazawa; Takeshi Ozaki	4:14
12.	"Restart" (リスタート)		Kotoko	Iuchi	5:15
13.	"Polygon" (P◇lyG△n)		Takase	Takase	4:44
14.	"Unfinished" (Album ver.)		Yaginuma	Yaginuma	4:44
