= Ai Space =

2008 video game

- Developer: Ai Space Production Committee
- Publisher: Ai Space Production Committee
- Platform: Windows
- Release: October 15, 2008–June 30, 2011
- Genres: MMOSG, Virtual world
- Modes: Single-player, multiplayer

Ai Space (officially stylized as ai sp@ce) was a Japanese virtual 3D massively multiplayer online social game (MMOSG) developed by several companies that formed the Ai Space Production Committee which was launched on October 15, 2008 for Windows PCs, despite an earlier announcement of a Q3 2008 release. Beta testing commenced between mid-September and mid-October 2008. Primary development was handled by Headlock, and Dwango provided the world's infrastructure and Internet service. Dwango's subsidiary Niwango tied in the Nico Nico Anime Channel from the Nico Nico Douga video sharing website which provided users the opportunity to upload gameplay sequences online. The game closed down on June 30, 2011.

A downloadable client program enables its users to interact through motional avatars with each other and primarily with bishōjo game heroines from three visual novels: Clannad by Key under Visual Art's, Shuffle! by Navel under Omegavision, and Da Capo II by Circus. After a player creates an avatar, one of the bishōjo game heroines is selected as a personal character doll, or "chara-doll", to live with on one of the game's three virtual "islands" which are patterned on the worlds featured in the three visual novels. The islands are connected by a central Akihabara Island where players with their chara-dolls can gather for chatting and events. The first theme song for Ai Space is sung by Kotoko.

== Gameplay ==
Before gameplay can begin, a player must download a client program unique to Ai Space which will enable its users to interact on the game's servers. The player is given the chance to customize a motional avatar to explore the virtual world. This avatar can be chosen to take on a male or female form; the male avatars are described as "cool" while female avatars are described as "sweet". Facial expressions, figures, and hairstyle among other things are customizable, and the player can even customize personal information like birthdays and blood type. The main gameplay will begin when the player has chosen one personal bishōjo game character from the visual novels Clannad, Shuffle!, and Da Capo II, which the player will be able to customize. These bishōjo characters, known in the game as character dolls, or "chara-dolls", are able to wear different costumes (based on in-game items), and do a variety of things such as memorize various motions to act out or dance. The chara-dolls can even eventually develop a unique personality for each user, known in-game as each chara-doll having a different "aitune".

The player and the selected chara-doll are able to live together in the game on one of the game's three virtual "islands" which are designed to resemble the worlds features in the three aforementioned visual novels used as reference material for the game. The house in which the players resides is equipped with furniture, though more could potentially be bought, along with items for the chara-doll or player to wear. When inside the house together, the chara-doll moves of her own accord, though when outside the chara-doll stays with the player. The player can freely converse with their chara-doll in a manner similar to visual novels where the text appears in the lower portion of the computer screen. The three islands are connected by a central "Akihabara Island", modeled after the real Akihabara, where the different players and chara-dolls can interact via chatting and events. When in Akihabara Island, the names given to the avatars and chara-dolls are viewable above their heads.

While Ai Space can be played free of charge, a player can buy Nico Nico Points from Nico Nico Douga for use in the game to expand the gameplay. Nico Nico Points can be used to obtain special in-game items such as clothing for the player's avatar and chara-doll, and furniture for the house where the player resides. The Nico Nico Points can be purchased in 1000, 2000, 3000, and 5000 point sets with one point costing roughly one yen (about one cent).

== Development ==
Ai Space is a collaborative effort from several companies that form the Ai Space Production Committee. The project is headed by the Dwango online service provider which developed the virtual world's infrastructure and Internet service support. According to Dwango's executive vice-president Toyoki Ōta, planning for the project began in 2006. The initial idea was to make a world like Ai Space, but only incorporate the Da Capo II franchise, but this was changed to incorporate the Clannad and Shuffle! franchises as well. In 2006, Dwango was still primarily involved with the mobile phone industry, but were able to gain Internet service experience due to launching their subsidiary video sharing website Nico Nico Douga, which made it possible for Ai Space to move forward in development.

Primary development was handled by Headlock which worked in collaboration with Key under Visual Art's, Navel with Omegavision, and Circus for the design of the bishōjo game heroines featured in Ai Space from Clannad, Shuffle!, and Da Capo II. Ai Space was initially going to be a text-based game similar to that of visual novels, but this was changed in favor of a 3D environment. Dwango's subsidiary Niwango ties in the Nico Nico Anime Channel from the Nico Nico Douga video sharing website by providing users the opportunity to upload gameplay sequences online. The trading card game company Bushiroad is also involved in the project. I've Sound member Kotoko sings the first theme song for Ai Space, entitled "U Make Ai Dream" (U make 愛 dream), and the single was released on December 3, 2008. Other music provided in the game is taken from the three visual novels used as a basis for Ai Space.

=== Beta testing ===
Despite an initial announcement of a Q3 2008 release of Ai Space's full version, beta testing for the game was conducted in three separate phases between mid-September to mid-October 2008. Phase one commenced between September 16 and September 19, 2008 and was restricted to 1,010 users. People had the chance to buy one of 1,010 "Ai Space Deluxe Card Sets" for 500 yen (about US$5) each at Comiket 74 between August 15 and August 17, 2008, but those who bought the card sets also had to submit a participation application between August 18 and September 3, 2008 at Ai Space's official website. Phase two beta testing occurred between September 22 and September 26, 2008 (though not September 23) and consisted of the first 1,010 users plus another 2,525, bringing the total number to 3,535. Finally, phase three commenced between October 7 and October 14, 2008 and consisted of the previous 3,535 users plus another 2,525, bringing the total number of beta testers to 6,060.

=== Release ===
Ai Space's client program was released for free on October 15, 2008 downloadable on Ai Space's official website for Windows PCs. On opening day, the number of people able to play the game was restricted to 53,000 users, and the number was gradually increased based on the order of a registration number a given player received when registering for Ai Space. In order to register for Ai Space, a user must already have an account for Nico Nico Douga.
