= Screw (song) =

Single by Kotoko
- B-side: "Buccaneer"
- Released: December 16, 2009
- Genre: J-pop
- Length: 20:58
- Label: Geneon
- Songwriters: Kotoko, Kazuya Takase
- Producer: I've Sound

Kotoko singles chronology
"Daily-daily Dream" (2009)	"Screw" (2009)	"Hekira no Sora e Izanaedo" (2010)

"Screw" (stylized as SCREW) was 14th single by the J-pop singer, Kotoko, was released on December 16, 2009. The title track was used as the theme song for Mamoru Oshii's film Assault Girls.

The single comes in a limited CD+DVD edition (GNCV-0022) and a regular CD-only edition (GNCV-0023). The DVD contains the promotional video for "SCREW".

== Track listing ==
1. Screw—5:25
  Lyrics: Kotoko
  Composition/arrangement: Kazuya Takase
2. Buccaneer—5:06
  Lyrics: Kotoko
  Composition/arrangement: Maiko Iuchi
3. Screw (instrumental) -- 5:25
4. Buccaneer (instrumental) -- 5:02

== Charts and sales ==
- Daily chart peak - #11
- Weekly chart peak - #24
- Total sales - 4,649 units
