= Snipe (song) =

Single by Kotoko
- B-side: "Close to Me...: I've in Budokan 2009 Live Ver."
- Released: June 24, 2009
- Genre: J-pop
- Length: 13:52
- Label: Geneon
- Songwriters: Kotoko, Maiko Iuchi
- Producer: I've Sound

Kotoko singles chronology
"Ao-Iconoclast / Pigeon-The Green-ey'd Monster" (2009)	"Snipe" (2009)	"Daily-daily Dream" (2009)

"Snipe" (stylized as "snIpe") is a maxi single released by the J-pop singer, Kotoko. Released on June 24, 2009, this single is also contained in the I've Sound 10th Anniversary 「Departed to the future」 Special CD BOX, released on March 25, 2009.

The accompanying song, "Close to Me...: I've in Budokan 2009 Live Ver.", is the live version of her first visual novel theme song with I've Sound that she performed in their concert in Budokan on January 2, 2009.

The single only came in a limited CD+DVD edition (GNCV-0018). The DVD will contain the Promotional Video for snIpe.

== Track listing ==
1. Snipe—5:05
  Lyrics: Kotoko
  Composition/Arrangement: Maiko Iuchi
2. Close to Me...: I've in Budokan 2009 Live Ver. -- 3:42
  Lyrics: Kotoko
  Composition/Arrangement: Kazuya Takase
3. Snipe (instrumental) -- 5:05

== I've Sound 10th Anniversary 「Departed to the future」 Special CD BOX ==
Oricon Ranking (Weekly)	Sales
43	4,339
