= U Make Ai Dream =

Single by Kotoko

from the album Kotoko's Game Song Complete Box "The Bible"
- Released: December 3, 2008
- Genre: Single
- Label: Geneon
- Songwriters: Kotoko, Kazuya Takase

Kotoko singles chronology
"Special Life!" (2008)	"U Make Ai Dream" (2008)	"Ao-Iconoclast / Pigeon-The Green-ey'd Monster" (2009)

U Make Ai Dream is a song performed the J-pop singer, Kotoko and be composed and arranged by the I've Sound founder, Kazuya Takase. Although released as a maxi single, this single does not contain a B-side but instead contains the karaoke and instrumental version of the title track. This single contains the theme song for the MMO game Ai Sp@ce.

The single's catalog number is GNCA-7921

== Track listing ==
1. U Make Ai Dream / U make 愛 dream
  Lyrics: Kotoko
  Composition/Arrangement: Kazuya Takase
2. U Make Ai Dream: Karaoke
3. U Make Ai Dream: Instrumental
