= Kirei na Senritsu =

Single by Kotoko
- B-side: "Rush"
- Released: March 7, 2007
- Genre: J-pop
- Length: 16:23
- Label: Geneon
- Songwriters: Marty Friedman, Oyuki Konno
- Producer: I've Sound

Kotoko singles chronology
"Chercher" (2006)	"Kirei na Senritsu" (2007)	"Hayate no Gotoku!" (2007)

Kirei na Senritsu (きれいな旋律) is the seventh single by the singer Kotoko for Geneon Entertainment. The title track was used as the final ending theme for the OVA of Maria-sama ga Miteru. The lyrics to this song were written by Konno Oyuki, the creator of Maria-sama ga Miteru, and the melody was composed by the former Megadeth guitarist Marty Friedman. The single reached a peak position of 18 on the Oricon chart, becoming Friedman's first top-20 single.

== Track listing ==
1. きれいな旋律 / Kirei na Senritsu—4:00
  Composition: Marty Friedman
  Arrangement: Tomoyuki Nakazawa, Maiko Iuchi
  Lyrics: Oyuki Konno
2. Rush—4:13
  Composition: Kotoko
  Arrangement: C.G mix
  Lyrics: Kotoko
3. きれいな旋律 (Instrumental) / Kirei na Senritsu (Instrumental) -- 3:59
4. Rush (Instrumental) -- 4:11

== Charts and sales ==
Oricon Ranking (Weekly)	Sales
18	12,249
