= Oboetete ii yo/DuDiDuWa*lalala =

Single by Kotoko

from the album Garasu no Kaze
- Released: August 11, 2004
- Genre: J-pop
- Length: 18:55
- Label: Geneon
- Composers: Tomoyuki Nakazawa (Oboetete Ii yo); Atsuhiko Nakatsubo, Kotoko, Johann Strauss II (DuDiDuWa*lalala)
- Lyricist: Kotoko (both songs)
- Producer: I've Sound

Kotoko singles chronology
"Oboetete ii yo/DuDiDuWa*lalala" (2004)	"Re-sublimity" (2004)

"Oboetete ii yo/DuDiDuWa*lalala" (覚えてていいよ/DuDiDuWa*lalala) is the first single released by Kotoko produced by I've Sound and under the Geneon Entertainment label. "DuDiDuWa*lalala" was used as the ending theme for the anime Tweeny Witches. The single reached number fifteen on the Oricon weekly charts and charted for seven weeks.

== Track listing ==
1. 覚えてていいよ / Oboetete Ii yo—4:11
  Composition: Tomoyuki Nakazawa
  Arrangement: Tomoyuki Nakazawa
  Lyrics: Kotoko
2. DuDiDuWa*lalala—5:17
  Composition: Atsuhiko Nakatsubo, Kotoko, Johann Strauss II
  Arrangement: Atsuhiko Nakatsubo
  Lyrics: Kotoko
3. 覚えてていいよ / Oboetete Ii yo (Karaoke) -- 4:10
4. DuDiDuWa*lalala (Karaoke) - 5:17
