= Tears Cyclone: Sei =

- Digital and limited edition cover

Studio album by Kotoko
- Released: June 26, 2019
- Recorded: 2018–2019
- Genre: J-pop
- Label: NBCUniversal Entertainment Japan
- Producer: Tomoyuki Nakazawa

Kotoko chronology
Tears Cyclone: Kai (2018)	Tears Cyclone: Sei (2019)	Kotoko's Game Song Complete Box "The Bible" (2020)

Tears Cyclone: Sei (tears cyclone –醒-) is the eighth studio album by Japanese singer-songwriter Kotoko. It was released on June 26, 2019, through NBCUniversal Entertainment Japan.

The album serves as the second part of a two-album series commemorating her fifteenth anniversary since her major debut in 2004. The album is a collaboration with composer Tomoyuki Nakazawa, a former associate from the I've Sound creative group, and centers around the themes of "awakening" and "tears."

== Background and release ==
Following the release of Tears Cyclone: Kai in 2018, a collaboration with I’ve Sound founder Kazuya Takase, Kotoko announced Tears Cyclone: Sei as the second installment of her 15th anniversary celebration. While Kai revisited her I’ve Sound roots, Sei explores new creative ground with Nakazawa, with whom Kotoko had considerably few collaborations despite their long association.

The album’s production spanned over a year, with significant reworking in 2019 to refine its concept and sound. Kotoko described this as her "densest" collaboration, marked by intense and detailed exchanges with Nakazawa due to their shared detail-oriented, meticulous and stubborn personalities. The album’s creation process involved Kotoko providing detailed song concepts to Nakazawa, followed by extensive discussions to align each track with the album’s themes. The collaboration was challenging, with Kotoko noting moments of near-breakdown due to the intensity of their creative process. Despite these hurdles, the album blends nostalgic elements from their I’ve Sound days with fresh, melodic, and diverse arrangements, ranging from digital sounds like drum and bass and trance to emotional rock and pop influences.

The album had no commercial singles, and it includes a self-cover of "Asu e no Namida," originally written by Kotoko and Nakazawa for Mami Kawada in 2003, and whom had decided to include on the album with the purpose of connecting Kotoko’s past and present. The self-cover of "Asu e no Namida" posed unique challenges, as Kotoko struggled to differentiate her performance from Kawada’s original due to their similar vocal styles at the time. Kotoko also ventured in composing two of the songs for the album, "･Hachi･=Flunky Puppy "Eight"" and "Azure Blue: Amairo no Kakūsen".

The album was released in two formats: a CD-only standard edition, and a first-press limited edition including a Blu-ray disc featuring live footage from the Kotoko Live Tour 2018 “Tears Cyclone: Kai” performance held on September 30, 2018, at Shibuya Tsutaya O-East. Additionally, people who pre-ordered the album online received a bonus CD featuring a new version of the song "Agony" -originally a b-side of Kotoko's 2004 single "Re-sublimity"- re-arranged by Kazuya Takase.

== Chart performance ==
Tears Cyclone: Sei peaked at number 26 on the Oricon Weekly Album charts, selling 2,853 copies on its first week.

== Track listing ==
All lyrics are written by Kotoko.

No.	Title	Music	Length
1.	"Sei: Metallic Tears" (醒 -metallic tears-)	Tomoyuki Nakazawa	3:47
2.	"Minazuki no Koi: Mimetic Memory" (水無月の恋 ～mimetic memory～)	Nakazawa	5:32
3.	"Thank You Birthday!!"	Nakazawa	4:47
4.	"Scale: Hen Hotanchō no Love Letter" (scale ～変ホ短調のラブレター～)	Nakazawa	4:55
5.	"Fukigen na Mermaid" (不機嫌な人魚)	Nakazawa	4:38
6.	"Asu e no Namida -Timeless Tear mix-" (明日への涙 -timeless tear mix-)	Nakazawa	6:20
7.	"Bug"	Nakazawa	4:40
8.	"･Hachi･= Flunky Puppy "Eight""	Kotoko	4:16
9.	"Tobiuo" (トビウオ)	Nakazawa	3:28
10.	"Azure Blue: Amairo no Kakūsen" (azure blue ～天色の架空線～)	Kotoko	4:55
11.	"Namida no Enogu" (ナミダノエノグ)	Nakazawa	5:15
12.	"Opal" (オパール)	Nakazawa	4:06
