= Ao-Iconoclast / Pigeon-The Green-ey'd Monster =

"Ao-Iconoclast / PIGEON-the green-ey'd monster-"

Single by Kotoko

from the album Kotoko's Game Song Complete Box "The Bible"
- Released: June 24, 2009
- Genre: J-pop
- Length: 18:14
- Label: Geneon
- Songwriters: Kotoko, Yugo Sasakura (Ao-Iconoclast); Kotoko, Ayumi Miyazaki (Pigeon-The Green-ey'd Monster)

Kotoko singles chronology
| "U Make Ai Dream" (2008) | "Ao-Iconoclast / PIGEON-the green-ey'd monster-" (2009) | "Snipe" (2009) |

"Ao-Iconoclast / PIGEON-the green-ey'd monster-" (蒼-Iconoclast / PIGEON-the green-ey'd monster-, lit. Blue-Iconoclast/PIGEON-the green-ey'd monster-) is a maxi single released by the J-pop singer Kotoko. It is her first single not to be produced by I've Sound. It was released on June 24, 2009, the same release date of her I've Sound single "'snIpe". "Ao-Iconoclast" was used as the theme song for the video game BlazBlue: Calamity Trigger. Although the song was replaced by "Hekira no Sora e Izanaedo" (also by Kotoko) in the game's sequel, BlazBlue: Continuum Shift, "Ao-Iconoclast" remains available in the game as an optional BGM.

This single's catalog number is GNCA-0129.

Both songs are produced by Ayumi Miyazaki.

== Track listing ==
1. Ao-Iconoclast (蒼-iconoclast)—4:54
  Lyrics: Kotoko
  Composition: Yugo Sasakura
  Arrangement: Ayumi Miyazaki
2. PIGEON-the green-ey'd monster- -- 4:15
  Lyrics: Kotoko
  Composition/Arrangement: Ayumi Miyazaki
3. Ao-Iconoclast (Instrumental) (蒼-iconoclast)—4:54
4. PIGEON-the green-ey'd monster- (Instrumental) -- 4:11

== Charts and sales ==
| Oricon Ranking (Weekly) | Sales |
|---|---|
| 26 | 7,003 |
