= Hekira no Sora e Izanaedo =

Single by Kotoko

from the album Kotoko's Game Song Complete Box "The Bible"
- B-side: "DIGITAL SNAIL"
- Released: July 7, 2010
- Genre: J-pop
- Label: Geneon
- Songwriters: Kotoko, C.G mix
- Producers: C.G mix Kenji Arai (新井健史)

Kotoko singles chronology
"Screw" (2009)	"Hekira no Sora e Izanaedo" (2010)	"Loop-the-Loop" (2010)

"Hekira no Sora e Izanaedo" (碧羅の天へ誘えど, Invitation to the Blue Sky) is the 15th single of the J-pop singer Kotoko. The title track was used as the theme song for the Xbox 360/PS3 game BlazBlue: Continuum Shift. This is Kotoko's second tie-up with the game after Ao-Iconoclast.

This single's catalog number is GNCV-0024.

== Track listing ==
1. "Hekira no Sora e Izanaedo" (碧羅の天へ誘えど, Invitation to the Blue Sky) — 4:06
  Lyrics: Kotoko
  Composition/arrangement: C.G mix
2. "Digital Snail" (デジタルスネイル) — 4:33
  Lyrics: Kotoko
  Composition/arrangement: Kenji Arai
3. "Hekira no Sora e Izanaedo" (Instrumental)
4. "Digital Snail" (Instrumental)

== Charts and sales ==
- Daily chart peak - #13
- Weekly chart peak - #18
- Total sales - 7,618 units
