= Epsilon no Fune =

Studio album by Kotoko
- Released: October 14, 2009
- Recorded: 2007–2009
- Genre: J-pop; pop-rock; dance-pop; electro-industrial
- Length: 66:27
- Label: Geneon

Kotoko chronology
| Uzu-Maki (2006) | Epsilon no Fune (2009) | Hiraku Uchū Poketto (2011) |

Alternative cover
- CD only Edition

Singles from Epsilon no Fune
- 1. "Hayate no Gotoku!" Released: May 23, 2007; 2. "Real Onigokko" Released: December 19, 2007; 3. "Blaze" Released: March 12, 2008

Epsilon no Fune (イプシロンの方舟, Ark of Epsilon) is the fourth studio album by Japanese singer Kotoko. It was released on October 14, 2009 by Geneon Entertainment. The album debuted at the sixth place of the Oricon daily charts, making this album one of the most successful in Kotoko's musical career. Overall, Epsilon no Fune is Kotoko's fourth best-selling album according to Oricon.

This album covers her "Hayate no Gotoku!", "Shichiten Hakki Shijou Shugi!", "Real Onigokko", and "Blaze" singles. There are nine new songs including a cover song performed with I've Sound creator, Kazuya Takase.

The album comes in a limited CD+DVD edition (GNCV-1014) and a regular CD-only edition (GNCV-1015). The DVD contains the PV and making for ε: Epsilon. Also, the album contained a special CD which contains a 2009 remix and the original version of her song Hitorigoto (ひとりごと, Soliloquy).

== Track listing ==
All lyrics are written by Kotoko, except "Little Baby Nothing" by James Dean Bradfield, Richard Edwards, Nicholas Allen Jones and Sean Moore.

| No. | Title | Music | Arrangement | Length |
|---|---|---|---|---|
| 1. | "ε~Epsilon~" | Kazuya Takase | Kazuya Takase | 6:50 |
| 2. | "Real Onigokko (リアル鬼ごっこ)" | Kazuya Takase | Kazuya Takase | 6:37 |
| 3. | "-∞-DRIVE" | Maiko Iuchi | Maiko Iuchi | 5:17 |
| 4. | "Scene" | Kazuya Takase | Kazuya Takase | 4:47 |
| 5. | "Ame to Guitar (雨とギター)" | Tomoyuki Nakazawa | Tomoyuki Nakazawa, Takeshi Ozaki | 4:10 |
| 6. | "Genkai Daha (限界打破)" | Kazuya Takase | Kazuya Takase | 4:32 |
| 7. | "Monera no Kizuna (モネラの絆)" | C.G mix | C.G mix | 5:24 |
| 8. | "Hayate no Gotoku! (ハヤテのごとく!)" | Kazuya Takase | Kazuya Takase | 4:25 |
| 9. | "RI←SU→KU" | Tomoyuki Nakazawa | Tomoyuki Nakazawa, Charlie Tanaka | 4:07 |
| 10. | "Hellion" | Maiko Iuchi | Maiko Iuchi | 5:22 |
| 11. | "Geoglyphs" | C.G mix | C.G mix, Takeshi Hoshino | 5:22 |
| 12. | "Blaze" | Kazuya Takase | Kazuya Takase | 5:07 |
| 13. | "Little Baby Nothing" (featuring Kazuya Takase of I've Sound) (Manic Street Preachers cover) | | | 4:27 |

Special CD
| No. | Title | Length |
|---|---|---|
| 1. | "Hitorigoto -2009 ver.- (ひとりごと, Soliloquy)" | 6:30 |
| 2. | "Hitorigoto -2001 original ver.- (ひとりごと, Soliloquy)" | 6:55 |

DVD
| No. | Title | Length |
|---|---|---|
| 1. | "ε: Epsilon PV" |
| 2. | "Making of ε: Epsilon PV" |

== Charts ==
| Chart (2009) | Peak position |
|---|---|
| Japanese Weekly Albums (Oricon) | 12 |
