= Real Onigokko =

Real Onigokko (リアル鬼ごっこ) may refer to:

- Real Onigokko, a 2001 Japanese horror novel by Yusuke Yamada
  - Real Onigokko, a 2008 film adaptation of the novel
  - The Chasing World 2, a sequel made in 2010
  - The Chasing World 3, a 2012 sequel starring Kento Yamazaki
    - "Real Onigokko" (song), theme song of the 2008 film performed by Kotoko
  - Tag (film) (Real Onigokko in Japanese), a 2015 film adaptation of the novel
    - "Real Onigokko", theme song of the 2015 film performed by Glim Spanky

== See also ==
- For the Japanese game of Onigokko, see tag (game).
