= Snow Angel (disambiguation) =

A snow angel is a depression in snow in the shape of an angel.

Snow Angel(s) may also refer to:

== Fiction ==
- Snow Angel (manga), a 2023 manga by Haruka Chizu
- Snow Angel (play), a 1999 play by David Lindsay-Abaire
- Snow Angels (comic), a 2021 miniseries by Jeff Lemire and Jock
- Snow Angels (novel), a 1994 novel by Stewart O'Nan
- Snow Angels (film), a 2007 adaptation of O'Nan's novel
- Snow Angel, a 1996 novel by Thom Racina
- The Snow Angel, a 2017 children's book by Lauren St John

== Music ==
- Snow Angel (Reneé Rapp album) or the title song, 2023
- Snow Angel (Värttinä album), 2005
- Snow Angels (album), by Over the Rhine, or the title song, 2006
- "Snow Angel", a song by Kotoko, 2002
- "Snow Angel", a song by Braids from Shadow Offering, 2020

== See also ==
- Celestial Snow Angel, or Sh2-106, an emission nebula and star-formation region in the constellation Cygnus
