= Uzu-Maki =

UZU-MAKI

Studio album by Kotoko
- Released: December 13, 2006
- Recorded: 2006
- Genre: J-pop
- Label: Geneon

Kotoko chronology
Garasu no Kaze (2005)	UZU-MAKI (2006)	Epsilon no Fune (2009)

UZU-MAKI is the third album of singer Kotoko, released under Geneon Entertainment. It was released on December 13, 2006 and peaked at number 16 on Oricon Albums Chart. Work on the record started with the title track after Kotoko mentioned to her producer, Kazuya Takase, about her different impressions on swirls (渦巻き, Uzu-maki).

== Track listing ==
1. Introduction
  Composition/Arrangement: Kazuya Takase, Tomoyuki Nakazawa
2. UZU-MAKI
  Lyrics: Kotoko
  Composition: Kazuya Takase
  Arrangement: Kazuya Takase, Takeshi Ozaki
3. Cider (サイダー)
  Lyrics/Composition: Kotoko
  Arrangement: C.G mix
4. Haru (春)
  Lyrics/Composition: Kotoko
  Arrangement: Kazuya Takase
5. Shasou no Shirabe (車窓の調べ)
  Lyrics/Composition: Kotoko
  Arrangement: Maiko Iuchi
6. Tsukiyo no Butoukai (月夜の舞踏会)
  Lyrics: Kotoko
  Composition: Kazuya Takase
  Arrangement: Tomoyuki Nakazawa
7. Iruka (海豚)
  Lyrics/Composition: Kotoko
  Arrangement: Tomoyuki Nakazawa, Takeshi Ozaki
8. Shuusou (秋爽)
  Lyrics: Kotoko
  Composition/Arrangement: C.G mix
9. Fuchidori no Sekai (縁どりの世界)
  Lyrics/Composition: Kotoko
  Arrangement: Kazuya Takase
10. Kaede no Michi, Guitar no Kanaderu Oka de (楓の道、ギターの奏でる丘で)
  Lyrics/Composition: Kotoko
  Arrangement: Maiko Iuchi
11. being
  Composition/Lyrics: Kotoko
  Arrangement: Kazuya Takase
12. Goodbye Dear
  Lyrics/Composition: Kotoko
  Arrangement: Tomoyuki Nakazawa, Takeshi Ozaki
13. Sekka no Shinwa In X'mas Mix (雪華の神話)
  Lyrics: Kotoko
  Composition: Kazuya Takase
  Arrangement: Kazuya Takase, Tomoyuki Nakazawa
