= Shichiten Hakki Shijou Shugi! =

Single by Kotoko

from the album Epsilon no Fune
- B-side: "Scene"
- Released: October 17, 2007
- Genre: J-pop
- Length: 18:47
- Label: Geneon
- Producer: I've Sound

Kotoko singles chronology
"Hayate no Gotoku!" (2007)	"Shichiten Hakki Shijou Shugi!" (2007)	"Real Onigokko" (2007)

"Shichiten Hakki Shijou Shugi!" (七転八起☆至上主義！) is Kotoko's ninth single, produced by I've Sound under the Geneon Entertainment label. The title track was used as the second opening theme for the anime series Hayate no Gotoku, episodes 27–52. It peaked at the #8 position in the Oricon charts and sold a total of 15,749 copies for two weeks. As of November 26, 2007, it has sold a total of 28,619 copies.

== Track listing ==
1. 七転八起☆至上主義！ / Shichiten Hakki Shijou Shugi! -- 4:38
  Composition: C.G mix
  Arrangement: C.G mix
  Lyrics: Kotoko
2. Scene—4:47
  Composition: Kazuya Takase
  Arrangement: Kazuya Takase
  Lyrics: Kotoko
3. 七転八起☆至上主義！ (Instrumental) / Shichiten Hakki Shijou Shugi! (Instrumental) -- 4:38
4. Scene (Instrumental) -- 4:44

== Charts and sales ==
Oricon Ranking (Weekly)	Sales
8	28,619
