= Hayate no Gotoku! (song) =

Single by Kotoko

from the album Epsilon no Fune
- B-side: "Naki Takattanda"
- Released: May 23, 2007
- Genre: J-pop
- Length: 22:30
- Label: Geneon
- Songwriters: Kazuya Takase, Kotoko
- Producer: I've Sound

Kotoko singles chronology
"Kirei na Senritsu" (2007)	"Hayate no Gotoku!" (2007)	"Shichiten Hakki Shijou Shugi!" (2007)

"Hayate no Gotoku!" (ハヤテのごとく！) is Kotoko's eighth maxi single produced by I've Sound and released on May 23, 2007, under Geneon Entertainment. The title track was used as the first opening theme for the anime series Hayate no Gotoku, episodes 1–26. The single peaked at #7 in the Oricon charts selling 19,921 units in its first week of release.

== Track listing ==
1. ハヤテのごとく！ / Hayate no Gotoku! -- 4:26
  Composition: Kazuya Takase
  Arrangement: Kazuya Takase
  Lyrics: Kotoko
2. 泣きたかったんだ / Nakitakattanda—6:50
  Composition: Kotoko
  Arrangement: C.G mix
  Lyrics: Kotoko
3. ハヤテのごとく！ (Instrumental) / Hayate no Gotoku! (Instrumental) -- 4:26
4. 泣きたかったんだ (Instrumental) / Nakitakattanda (Instrumental) -- 6:48

== Charts and sales ==
Oricon Ranking (Weekly)	Sales
7	33,421
