= Animazement =

Anime convention held in Raleigh, North Carolina

Coordinates: 35°46′25″N 78°38′28″W

- Status: Active
- Genre: Anime, Manga, Japanese culture
- Venue: Raleigh Convention Center
- Location: Raleigh, North Carolina
- Country: United States
- Inaugurated: 1998
- Attendance: 12,877 in 2023
- Organizer: Educational Growth Across Oceans
- Filing status: 501(c)3
- Website: http://www.animazement.com/

Animazement is an annual three-day anime convention held during May at the Raleigh Convention Center in Raleigh, North Carolina. It is traditionally held over Memorial Day weekend. The convention is designed to be family-friendly. Animazement is run by unpaid staff and volunteers.

== Programming ==
The convention typically offers an artist alley, classes, concerts, cosplay chess, cosplay contests, dealers room, gaming tournaments, manga library, masquerade ball, musicians, panel discussions, raves, various gaming rooms (arcade, console, retro), video screenings, and voice actors.

Animazement raised over $12,000 for several charities in 2015.

== History ==
The convention originates from a 1997 36-hour anime marathon, organized by the Triangle Area Anime Society (TAAS) at North Carolina State University. It was first held in Raleigh, North Carolina at the North Raleigh Hilton in 1998, moved to the Sheraton Imperial Hotel and Convention Center in Durham, North Carolina for 2001, and to the month of May in 2002. In 2009, four Japanese guests canceled appearances due to quarantine concerns over the Swine flu. In 2009, Animazement moved to the Raleigh Convention Center. Noboru Ishiguro was scheduled to attend the 2012 event, but died prior to the event. The convention celebrated its 20th anniversary in 2017.

Animazement was canceled in 2020 and 2021 due to the COVID-19 pandemic.

=== Event history ===
Dates	Location	Atten.	Guests
March 20–22, 1998	Hilton North Raleigh; Raleigh, North Carolina	735	Steve Bennett, Michael Brady, Juliet Cesario, Rurika Fuyuki, Scott Houle, Yasuhiro Imagawa, Yuu Kamijyou, Masakazu Katsura, Lanelle Markgraf, Fred Perry, Scott Simpson, Apollo Smile, Doug Smith, Nobuyuki Takahashi, Dave Underwood, Pamela Weidner, and Amanda Winn-Lee.
March 19–21, 1999	Hilton North Raleigh; Raleigh, North Carolina	1,235	Tiffany Grant, Michael Brady, Juliet Cesario, Traci Dinwiddie, Rurika Fuyuki, Scott Houle, Yasuhiro Imagawa, Yukako Midori, Fred Perry, Scott Simpson, Nobuyuki Takahashi, Dave Underwood, Yuu Watase, Pamela Weidner, Shin Kurokawa, Nozomi Suzuki, and Toshifumi Yoshida.
March 10–12, 2000	Hilton North Raleigh; Raleigh, North Carolina	1,640	Kia Asamiya, Scott Houle, Amy Howard-Wilson, Kunihiko Ikuhara, Toshifumi Inagawa, Akira Kamiya, Hiroyuki Kitakubo, Rachael Lillis, Kazuto Nakazawa, Lisa Ortiz, Chiho Saito, Nobuyuki Takahashi, Koichi Tsunoda, Yuu Watase, Brett Weaver, and Pamela Weidner.
May 25–27, 2001	Sheraton Imperial Hotel and Convention Center; Durham, North Carolina	1,900	Scott Houle, Akira Kamiya, Tsukasa Kotobuki, Amy Tipton, Koichi Tsunoda, Yuu Watase, Pamela Weidner, and Yasuo Yamaguchi.
May 24–26, 2002	Sheraton Imperial Hotel and Convention Center; Durham, North Carolina	2,050	Jason Hatfield, Scott Houle, Hiroyuki Kitakubo, Hiroaki Sakurai, Amy Tipton, Koichi Tsunoda, Pamela Weidner, and Yasuo Yamaguchi.
May 23–25, 2003	Sheraton Imperial Hotel and Convention Center; Durham, North Carolina	2,300	Tiffany Grant, Scott Houle, Akira Kamiya, Hiroyuki Kitakubo, Kyōko Hikami, Kazuto Nakazawa, Hiroaki Sakurai, Asami Sanada, Jonathan Tarbox, Koichi Tsunoda, Brett Weaver, Pamela Weidner, Yasuo Yamaguchi, and Yoshinobu Yamakawa.
May 28–30, 2004	Sheraton Imperial Hotel and Convention Center; Durham, North Carolina	2,700	Mary Evans, Nicole B. Gibson, Scott Houle, Akira Kamiya, Charles Dee Rice, Chika Sakamoto, Koichi Tsunoda, Yuu Watase, Crystal Waters, and Yasuo Yamaguchi.
May 27–29, 2005	Sheraton Imperial Hotel and Convention Center; Durham, North Carolina	2,750	Keiko Han, Kyle Hebert, Kyōko Hikami, Aya Hisakawa, Scott Houle, Keiko Ichihara, Akira Kamiya, Chika Sakamoto, Michihiko Suwa, Koichi Tsunoda, Pamela Weidner, and Yasuo Yamaguchi.
May 26–28, 2006	Sheraton Imperial Hotel and Convention Center; Durham, North Carolina	3,275	Chris Cason, Bruce Elliott, Caitlin Glass, Keiko Han, Kyle Hebert, Scott Houle, Yuki Ito, Akira Kamiya, Yoshinori Kanemori, Trish Ledoux, Rica Matsumoto, Ryūsei Nakao, Michihiko Suwa, Nobuhiro Suzumura, Koichi Tsunoda, Pamela Weidner, Yasuo Yamaguchi, and Toshifumi Yoshida.
May 25–27, 2007	Sheraton Imperial Hotel and Convention Center; Durham, North Carolina	4,500	Juliet Cesario, Kara Edwards, Caitlin Glass, Keiko Han, Kyle Hebert, Kyōko Hikami, Scott Houle, Kikuko Inoue, Akira Kamiya, Takeshi Kusao, Trish Ledoux, Masao Maruyama, Chika Sakamoto, Michihiko Suwa, Koichi Tsunoda, Kari Wahlgren, Pamela Weidner, Yasuo Yamaguchi, Toshifumi Yoshida, and Satsuki Yukino.
May 23–25, 2008	Sheraton Imperial Hotel and Convention Center; Durham, North Carolina	5,374	Kara Edwards, Mitsuo Fukuda, Takako Furukawa, Caitlin Glass, Keiko Han, Kyle Hebert, Scott Houle, Akira Kamiya, Takeshi Kusao, Vic Mignogna, Kotono Mitsuishi, Ryūsei Nakao, Jōji Nakata, Michihiko Suwa, Koichi Tsunoda, Kumiko Watanabe, Yasuo Yamaguchi, and Maya Yamao.
May 22–24, 2009	Raleigh Convention Center; Raleigh, North Carolina	5,964	Kara Edwards, Caitlin Glass, Kyle Hebert, Scott Houle, Yusuke Igarashi, Trish Ledoux, Masao Maruyama, Ryūsei Nakao, Jun Shishido, Spike Spencer, UchuSentai:Noiz, Cristina Vee, Maya Yamao, Toshifumi Yoshida, Cherami Leigh, and Michael Sinterniklaas.
May 28–30, 2010	Raleigh Convention Center; Raleigh, North Carolina	7,070	Richard Ian Cox, Keiko Han, Noriko Hidaka, Yusuke Igarashi, Kazuhiko Inoue, Trish Ledoux, Chiho Saito, Chika Sakamoto, Spike Spencer, Koichi Tsunoda, UchuSentai:Noiz, Cristina Vee, Kappei Yamaguchi, Yasuo Yamaguchi, and Toshifumi Yoshida.
May 27–29, 2011	Raleigh Convention Center; Raleigh, North Carolina	7,000	Leah Clark, Todd Haberkorn, Kyle Hebert, Hiroaki Hirata, Cherami Leigh, Masao Maruyama, Hidenori Matsubara, Ryūsei Nakao, Jōji Nakata, Patrick Seitz, and Eric Vale.
May 25–27, 2012	Raleigh Convention Center; Raleigh, North Carolina	8,000	Jennifer Barclay, Chris Cason, Kara Edwards, Toshio Furukawa, Clarine Harp, Ichiro Itano, The Jacabal's, Kotoko, Shelby Lindley, Masao Maruyama, Hiroshi Nagahama, Fumiko Orikasa, Jez Roth, Mayu Shinjo, Spike Spencer, and Cristina Vee.
May 23–26, 2013	Raleigh Convention Center; Raleigh, North Carolina	7,500+ or 8,800	Sho Asano, Christine Marie Cabanos, Kara Edwards, Toshio Furukawa, Keiko Han, Megumi Han, Kyle Hebert, Yumi Ishiguro, The Jacabal's, Yoichi Kotabe, Laugh Out Loud, Trish Ledoux, Masao Maruyama, Haruhiko Mikimoto, Yūko Minaguchi, Hiroshi Nagahama, Ryūsei Nakao, Toshio Nakatani, Masako Nozawa, Jez Roth, Sean Schemmel, Koichi Tsunoda, UchuSentai:Noiz, and Toshifumi Yoshida.
May 23–25, 2014	Raleigh Convention Center; Raleigh, North Carolina	11,287	Sho Asano, Christine Marie Cabanos, Toshio Furukawa, Toru Furuya, Keiko Han, Takafumi Hori, Shuichi Ikeda, Yuji Kaneko, Kotoko, Lauren Landa, Laugh Out Loud, Trish Ledoux, Masao Maruyama, Kazuya Masumoto, Jason Charles Miller, Ryuusei Nakao, Ai Nonaka, Jez Roth, Shin Sasaki, Taishi Yamabe, Toshifumi Yoshida, Yoh Yoshinari, and Nobuteru Yuuki.
May 22–24, 2015	Raleigh Convention Center; Raleigh, North Carolina	11,300+	Bennett Abara, Sho Asano, Crispin Freeman, Keiko Han, Noriko Hidaka, Kikuko Inoue, The Jacabal's, Shinichiro Kashiwada, Laugh Out Loud, Trish Ledoux, Hidenori Matsubara, Ryuusei Nakao, ROOKiEZ is PUNK'D, Jez Roth, Michael Sinterniklaas, Shinichiro Watanabe, Taishi Yamabe, Toshifumi Yoshida, Linda Young.
May 27–29, 2016	Raleigh Convention Center; Raleigh, North Carolina	14,127+	Shingo Adachi, Sho Asano, Keiko Han, Kyle Hebert, Aya Hirano, The Jacabal's, Shinichiro Kashiwada, Erik Scott Kimerer, Toru Kubo, Lauren Landa, Trish Ledoux, Erica Lindbeck, Masao Maruyama, Yuu Mizushima, Sadayuki Murai, Soichi Noguchi, Oreskaband, Jez Roth, Akane Takahashi, Hidetaka Tenjin, Masuo Ueda, Toshiyuki Watanabe, Taishi Yamabe, and Toshifumi Yoshida.
May 26–28, 2017	Raleigh Convention Center; Raleigh, North Carolina		Sho Asano, Kira Buckland, Keiko Han, Hiroaki Hirata, Mari Iijima, The Jacabal's, Trish Ledoux, Masao Maruyama, Ryuusei Nakao, Jez Roth, Hidetaka Tenjin, Masuo Ueda, Eric Vale, David Vincent, Toshifumi Yoshida, and Linda Young.
May 25–27, 2018	Raleigh Convention Center; Raleigh, North Carolina		Akitaroh Daichi, Keiko Han, Someta Hayashiya, Motonobu Hori, Tomohiko Ito, J-Trap, The Jacabal's, Etsuko Kawamura, Lauren Landa, Trish Ledoux, E. Jason Liebrecht, Elizabeth Maxwell, Hiroshi Nagahama, Derek Stephen Prince, Jez Roth, Masuo Ueda, David Vincent, Steff Von Schweetz, Shinichiro Watanabe, JP Yates, and Toshifumi Yoshida.
May 23-26, 2019	Raleigh Convention Center; Raleigh, North Carolina		Morgan Berry, Cherry Tea Girl, Jennifer Cihi, Stefanie DeLeo, Keiko Han, Someta Hayashiya, J-Trap, Etsuko Kawamura, Trish Ledoux, Masao Maruyama, Kotono Mitsuishi, Ryuusei Nakao, Derek Stephen Prince, Jez Roth, Paul St. Peter, Third Impact Anime, JP Yates, Toshifumi Yoshida, and Linda Young.
May 27-29, 2022	Raleigh Convention Center; Raleigh, North Carolina	10,812	Bryson Baugus, Cynthia Cranz, Ricco Fajardo, Tiffany Grant, Keiko Han, Megumi Han, Kyle Hebert, Noriko Hidaka, Mari Iijima, Etsuko Kawamura, Mason Lieberman, Mike McFarland, Kazuto Nakazawa, Wendy Powell, Spike Spencer, Third Impact Anime, and Masuo Ueda.
May 26-28, 2023	Raleigh Convention Center; Raleigh, North Carolina	12,877	Bryn Apprill, Dani Chambers, Ricco Fajardo, Caitlin Glass, Someta Hayashiya, The Jacabal's, Etsuko Kawamura, Christina Marie Kelly, Hiroshi Nagahama, Aaron Roberts, ROOKiEZ is PUNK'D, and Jez Roth.
May 24-26, 2024	Raleigh Convention Center; Raleigh, North Carolina		Sho Asano, Morgan Berry, Toshio Furukawa, Someta Hayashiya, Noriko Hidaka, Kikuko Inoue, The Jacabal's, Shino Kakinuma, Etsuko Kawamura, Trish Ledoux, Emi Lo, Erica Mendez, Hiroshi Nagahama, Jez Roth, Keith Silverstein, Third Impact Anime, Kari Wahlgren, Howard Wang, Yoshihiro Watanabe, Taishi Yamabe, JP Yates, Toshifumi Yoshida, Jiro Ando, Koji Nagai, and Honoka Inoue.
May 23-25, 2025	Raleigh Convention Center; Raleigh, North Carolina		Aimi, Khoi Dao, Someta Hayashiya, Hiroaki Hirata, The Jacabal's, Etsuko Kawamura, Christina Marie Kelly, Chie Koujiro, Trish Ledoux, Masao Maruyama, Hiroshi Nagahama, Ryuusei Nakao, Jez Roth, Chika Sakamoto, Paul St. Peter, Laura Stahl, Sarah Anne Williams, JP Yates, and Toshifumi Yoshida.
May 22-24, 2026	Raleigh Convention Center; Raleigh, North Carolina		Kamen Casey, Aaron Dismuke, Toshio Furukawa, Someta Hayashiya, Hiroaki Hirata, The Jacabal's, Shino Kakinuma, Etsuko Kawamura, Trish Ledoux, Reagan Murdock, Lisa Ortiz, Jez Roth, Shinichiro Watanabe, Sarah Wiedenheft, JP Yates, and Toshifumi Yoshida.
