= Chercher (song) =

"Chercher: シャルシェ"

Single by Kotoko

from the album Uzu-Maki (B-side)
- B-side: "Tsukiyou no butoukai"
- Released: October 25, 2006
- Genre: J-pop
- Length: 21:05
- Label: Geneon
- Songwriters: C.G mix, Oyuki Konno
- Producer: I've Sound

Kotoko singles chronology
"Being" (2005)	"Chercher: シャルシェ" (2006)	"Kirei na Senritsu" (2007)

"Chercher" (Chercher～シャルシェ～, Chercher ~Sharushe~) is Kotoko's sixth maxi single under Geneon Entertainment. The title track was used as an ending theme for OVA of Maria-sama ga Miteru. The lyrics of the song was written by the creator of Maria-sama ga Miteru, Oyuki Konno.

== Track listing ==
1. Chercher～シャルシェ～ -- 4:39
  Composition: C.G mix
  Arrangement: C.G mix
  Lyrics: Oyuki Konno
2. 月夜の舞踏会 / Tsukiyo no Butoukai—5:55
  Composition: Kazuya Takase
  Arrangement: Tomoyuki Nakazawa
  Lyrics: Kotoko
3. Chercher: シャルシェ (Instrumental) -- 4:39
4. 月夜の舞踏会 (Instrumental) / Tsukiyo no butoukai (Instrumental) -- 5:52

== Charts and sales ==
Oricon Ranking (Weekly)	Sales
16	17,090
