= Daily-daily Dream =

"daily-daily Dream"

Single by Kotoko
- B-side: "Message"
- Released: August 26, 2009
- Genre: J-pop
- Length: 20:25
- Label: Geneon
- Songwriters: Kotoko, C.G mix
- Producer: I've Sound

Kotoko singles chronology
"Snipe" (2009)	"daily-daily Dream" (2009)	"Screw" (2009)

"daily-daily Dream' is J-pop singer Kotoko's thirteenth single and was released on August 26, 2009. The song was used as the second opening theme for the second season of Hayate the Combat Butler, making this her third tie-in with the anime series.

The single came in a limited CD+DVD edition (GNCV-0005) and a regular CD-only edition (GNCV-0006). The DVD contained the promotional video for "daily-daily Dream".

== Track listing ==
1. daily-daily Dream—5:07
  Lyrics: Kotoko
  Composition/Arrangement: C.G mix
2. Message—5:07
  Composition/Lyrics: Kotoko
  Arrangement: SORMA No.1
3. daily-daily Dream (instrumental) -- 5:07
4. Message (instrumental) -- 5:04

== Chart and sales ==
Chart (2009)	Peak position
Oricon Daily Singles Chart	13
Oricon Weekly Singles Chart	16
Sales	10,428
