= Loop-the-Loop (song) =

Single by Kotoko

from the album Kūchū Puzzle
- B-side: "Raimei ga Naku Koro"
- Released: October 20, 2010
- Genre: J-pop
- Label: Geneon
- Songwriters: Kotoko, Tomoyuki Nakazawa

Kotoko singles chronology
"Hekira no Sora e Izanaedo" (2010)	"Loop-the-Loop" (2010)	"Light My Fire" (2011)

"Loop-the-Loop" is the 16th single of the J-pop singer Kotoko, released on October 20, 2010. The title track is used as the opening theme for the anime series Motto To Love-Ru, the sequel to the anime adaptation of To Love-Ru.

This single was released in two editions: the CD+DVD edition (GNCV-0025) and CD-only edition (GNCV-0026). The DVD contains the promotional video for "'Loop-the-Loop".

== Track listing ==
1. "Loop-the-Loop" — 4:13
  Lyrics: Kotoko
  Composition: Tomoyuki Nakazawa
  Arrangement: Tomoyuki Nakazawa, Takeshi Ozaki
2. "Raimei ga Naku Koro" (雷鳴が鳴く頃) — 5:55
  Lyrics: Kotoko
  Composition/arrangement: C.G mix
3. "Loop-the-Loop" (Instrumental)
4. "Raimei ga Naku Koro" (Instrumental) (雷鳴が鳴く頃)

== Charts and sales ==
- Daily chart - #14
- Weekly chart - #18
- First week sales - 4,304 units
