= Garasu no Kaze =

Studio album by Kotoko
- Released: June 8, 2005
- Recorded: 2005
- Genre: J-pop, rock
- Length: 69:11
- Label: Geneon

Kotoko chronology
Hane (2004)	Garasu no Kaze (2005)	Uzu-Maki (2006)

Garasu no Kaze (硝子の靡風; "Dispersed Wind of Glass") is the second album by Japanese singer Kotoko. It was released June 8, 2005.

== Track listing ==
All lyrics are written by Kotoko.

No.	Title	Music	Arrangement	Length
1.	"Retrieve"	Kazuya Takase	Kazuya Takase	5:47
2.	"Wing My Way"	Kazuya Takase	Kazuya Takase	6:01
3.	"Oboetete Ii yo (覚えてていいよ)"	Tomoyuki Nakazawa	Tomoyuki Nakazawa	4:11
4.	"Tameiki Clover (ため息クローバー)"	Kotoko	Kazuya Takase	5:11
5.	"Meconopsis"	Kotoko	I've Sound	6:15
6.	"Sasakure (ささくれ)"	Kotoko	C.G mix	4:50
7.	"Kohaku (琥珀)"	Tomoyuki Nakazawa, Kotoko	Tomoyuki Nakazawa, Takeshi Ozaki	5:14
8.	"Re-sublimity"	Kazuya Takase	Kazuya Takase	5:19
9.	"Garasu no Kaze (硝子の靡風)"	Kotoko	Kazuya Takase	5:06
10.	"421-a will-"	Tomoyuki Nakazawa	Tomoyuki Nakazawa, Takeshi Ozaki	4:54
11.	"Free Angels"	Kotoko	Sorma No.1	4:21
12.	"β－Nendo no Hoshi (β－粘土の惑星)"	Kotoko	Kazuya Takase	6:04
13.	"Akai Tama, Aoi Tama (赤い玉、青い玉)"	Kotoko	Seiichi Kyouda	5:58
