= Hane (Kotoko album) =

羽 -hane-

Studio album by Kotoko
- Released: April 21, 2004
- Recorded: 2004
- Genre: J-Pop, J-Rock
- Length: 72:35
- Label: Geneon

Kotoko chronology
羽 -hane- (2004)	Garasu no Kaze (2005)

Hane (羽 -hane-) is the first full album by the Japanese artist Kotoko. It was released on April 21, 2004. Later on June 20, 2006, she released an English version of this album with the same title Hane but without its kanji.

The album consists of re-recordings of material from Kotoko's previous project, Sora o Tobetara.

== Original track listing ==
1. Introduction - 0:58
  Composition: Maiko Iuchi
  Arrangement: Kazuya Takase, Tomoyuki Nakazawa
2. Asura - 5:23
  Composition/Arrangement: Kazuya Takase
  Lyrics: Kotoko
3. Fuyu no Shizuku (冬の雫) - 7:07
  Composition/Lyrics: Kotoko
  Arrangement: Kazuya Takase
4. Hayategumo (疾風雲) - 7:06
  Composition/Lyrics: Kotoko
  Arrangement: Kazuya Takase, Tomoyuki Nakazawa
5. Gratitude: Ooki na Kuri no Ki no Shita de (大きな栗の木の下で) - 4:36
  Composition/Arrangement: Tomoyuki Nakazawa
  Lyrics: Kotoko
6. Gen'ei (幻影) - 4:26
  Composition/Lyrics: Kotoko
  Arrangement: Sorma No.3
7. Itai yo (痛いよ) - 4:48
  Composition/Lyrics: Kotoko
  Arrangement: Fish Tone
8. Hitorigoto (ひとりごと) - 6:47
  Composition/Lyrics: Kotoko
  Arrangement: Kazuya Takase
9. Koe ga Todoku Nara (声が届くなら) - 7:20
  Composition/Lyrics: Kotoko
  Arrangement: C.G mix
10. Lament - 5:47
  Composition/Arrangement: Kazuya Takase
  Lyrics: Kotoko
11. Ashiato (足あと) - 5:25
  Composition/Lyrics: Kotoko
  Arrangement: Tomoyuki Nakazawa
12. Hane (羽) - 7:39
  Composition/Lyrics: Kotoko
  Arrangement: Kazuya Takase
13. Kanariya: Sorma No.3 Re-mix (カナリヤ) - 5:13
  Composition/Lyrics: Kotoko
  Arrangement: Sorma No.3

== English track listing ==
1. Introduction
  Composition: Maiko Iuchi
  Arrangement: Kazuya Takase, Tomoyuki Nakazawa
2. Asura
  Composition/Arrangement: Kazuya Takase
  Lyrics: Kotoko
3. Droplets of Winter
  Composition/Lyrics: Kotoko
  Arrangement: Kazuya Takase
4. Whirlwind Clouds
  Composition/Lyrics: Kotoko
  Arrangement: Kazuya Takase, Tomoyuki Nakazawa
5. Gratitude: Under a Large Chestnut Tree
  Composition/Arrangement: Tomoyuki Nakazawa
  Lyrics: Kotoko
6. Illusion
  Composition/Lyrics: Kotoko
  Arrangement: Sorma No.3
7. It Hurts
  Composition/Lyrics: Kotoko
  Arrangement: Fish Tone
8. Soliloquy
  Composition/Lyrics: Kotoko
  Arrangement: Kazuya Takase
9. If My Voice Is to Be Heard
  Composition/Lyrics: Kotoko
  Arrangement: C.G mix
10. Lament
  Composition/Arrangement: Kazuya Takase
  Lyrics: Kotoko
11. Footprint
  Composition/Lyrics: Kotoko
  Arrangement: Tomoyuki Nakazawa
12. Wings
  Composition/Lyrics: Kotoko
  Arrangement: Kazuya Takase
13. Canary
  Composition/Lyrics: Kotoko
  Arrangement: Sorma No.3
