= Hitomi Momoi =

Hitomi Momoi 桃井ひとみ
- Born: 桃井ひとみ; April 1, 1974 (age 52)
- Origin: Sapporo, Hokkaidō, Japan
- Genres: J-pop, trance, techno
- Occupations: Singer, songwriter
- Years active: 1995–present
- Website: momoihitomi.com

Hitomi Momoi (桃井ひとみ, Momoi Hitomi) is a J-pop singer, songwriter who is a member of Por, a duo which she and Ryo formed. Momo is a former member of the Japanese music production, I've Sound.

== Chronology ==
- 1995—P・o・r was formed
- 2001—The name "P・o・r" changed as "Por". Momo joined I've Sound.
- 2005—Live concert in Nippon Budokan (I've in Budokan 2005: Open the Birth Gate)
- 2006—Momo graduated from I've Sound and continued her singing career with her group Por.
- 2009—Por breaks up and Momo, who changed her name to Hitomi Momoi, her real name, stars her solo career and publishes her first single, "Yuudachi". In this single, she counts with the collaboration of Atsuhiko Nakatsubo, former I've Sound instrumentist. The single contains two songs: One of them is the one that gives the name of the single and the B side's title is "Hanausagi".

== Discography ==
=== Albums ===
==== Solo albums ====
Year	Information	Oricon chart peaks			
Year	Information	Daily	Weekly	Monthly	Yearly
2011	Kaeru no Uta: Released: May 11, 2011	—	—	—	—

==== As P.O.R ====
Year	Information	Oricon chart peaks			
Year	Information	Daily	Weekly	Monthly	Yearly
1995	RISE	—	—	—	—
1997	Yuuenchi	—	—	—	—
2000	Kamihanki: Released: August 1, 2000	—	—	—	—
2001	Shimohanki: Released: March 3, 2001	—	—	—	—
2001	Orgel: Released: December 10, 2001	—	—	—	—
2003	CYCLE: Released: May 5, 2003	—	—	—	—
2004	Kotodama Sakiwau Uta: Released: January 1, 2004	—	—	—	—
2004	Thalys: Released: October 1, 2004	—	—	—	—
2006	Kono Yubi Tomare: Released: March 4, 2006	—	—	—	—

=== Singles ===
==== Maxi Singles ====
Year	Title	Oricon chart peaks				Album
Year	Title	Daily	Weekly	Monthly	Yearly	Album
2009	"Yuudachi"	—	—	—	—	—

==== As P.O.R ====
Year	Title	Oricon chart peaks				Album
Year	Title	Daily	Weekly	Monthly	Yearly	Album
2000	"Christmas☆Chef"	—	—	—	—	Orgel
2002	"Soup"	—	—	—	—	Kotodama Sakiwau Uta
2003	"Motto Motto"	—	—	—	—	Kaeru no Uta

=== Other songs ===
==== Solo works ====
Year	Title	Album	Track
2001	"The whereabouts in the sun"	—	—
2004	"Niji no Umareru Machi (虹の生まれる街)"	Spotlight Kid	#01
2009	"Wonderful Days"	SALON MUZIK	#04

==== I've Sound works ====
Year	Title	Album	Track
2001	"Uneasy -Remix-"	A Compilation Album of PC-Game Musics "G-Mix"	#05
2001	"Velocity of Sound"	Out Flow	#11
2001	"Philosophy"	Collective	#05
2002	"DROWNING"	Disintegration	#08
2002	"GREEDY"	Lament	#07
2002	"D-THREAD"	—	—
2002	"DROWNING -Ghetto Blaster Style-"	I've Mania Tracks Vol.I	#02
2003	"Koi no Magnet (恋のマグネット)"	I've Mania Tracks Vol.III	#07
2003	"D-THREAD -Remix-"	—	—
2003	"Konata Yori Kanata Made (こなたよりかなたまで)"	I've Mania Tracks Vol.II	#07
2004	"Spillage"	I've Mania Tracks Vol.III	#11
2004	"Philosophy (Mixed up ver.)"	Mixed Up	No. 04
2007	"Cherish"	EXTRACT	CD2#08

==== As I've Special Unit ====
Year	Title	Album	Track
2003	"See You ~Chiisana Eien~ (P.V Ver.) (See You 〜小さな永遠〜)"	I've Mania Tracks Vol. I	No. 13
2005	"Fair Heaven"	G.C.Best	—

==== As P.O.R ====
Year	Title	Album	Track
2001	"Kimi wo Omoidasu (君を思い出す)"	A Compilation Album of PC-Game Musics "G-Mix"	#11

Footnotes

- — = N/A
