= Hiraku Uchū Poketto =

Hiraku Uchū Pocket

Studio album by Kotoko
- Released: October 5, 2011
- Recorded: 2011
- Genre: J-pop
- Length: 61:57
- Label: Warner Music Japan

Kotoko chronology
Epsilon no Fune (2009)	Hiraku Uchū Pocket (2011)	Kūchū Puzzle (2013)

Hiraku Uchū Pocket (ヒラく宇宙ポケット) is the fifth studio album by J-pop singer Kotoko（コトコ）. It was released on October 5, 2011 under Warner Music Japan.

== Chart performance ==
It debuted at number 21 on the Oricon weekly album chart on October 17, 2011. Initial sales were 5,199 copies.

== Track listing ==
All lyrics are written by Kotoko.

No.	Title	Music	Arrangement	Length
1.	"TR∀NSFoRM"	Takase Kazuya	Takase Kazuya	4:38
2.	"☆-Mirai-Ressha-☆ (☆-未来-列車-☆)"	kz	kz	4:36
3.	"Maeterlinck (メーテルリンク)"	Deco*27	Deco*27	3:06
4.	"Love Letter (ラブレター)"	Nakazawa Tomoyuki	Nakazawa Tomoyuki, Ozaki Takeshi	4:21
5.	"Aoi Jeep de (青いジープで)"	Ozaki Takeshi	Nakazawa Tomoyuki, Ozaki Takeshi	3:43
6.	"mirror garden"	Kotoko	Masayoshi Minoshima	5:08
7.	"Command+S"	Hiroyuki ODA Pres. HSP	Hiroyuki ODA Pres. HSP	8:34
8.	"X-kai-"	Ozaki Takeshi	Nakazawa Tomoyuki, Ozaki Takeshi	4:32
9.	"Sa.yo.na...ra (サ・ヨ・ナ・・・ラ)"	Iuchi Maiko	夏目晋	4:57
10.	"beat"	Kotoko, Ozaki Takeshi	Ozaki Takeshi, Nakazawa Tomoyuki	3:39
11.	"Kikoeru (聞こえる)"	Kotoko	C.G mix	5:29
12.	"Hirake! Sora no Oto (開け！ソラノオト)"	Saito Shinya	Saito Shinya	4:32
13.	"Chikyuu -TERRA- (地球-TERRA-)"	Iuchi Maiko	Iuchi Maiko	4:54
