= Special Life! =

Single by Kotoko
- B-side: "Capriccio: Kokoro wa Itsumo Kumori Nochi Hare"
- Released: May 21, 2008
- Recorded: 2008
- Genre: J-pop
- Length: 18:43
- Label: Geneon
- Composer: C.G mix
- Lyricist: Kotoko
- Producer: I've Sound

"Special Life!" is Kotoko's twelfth maxi single produced by I've Sound and Geneon Entertainment label. This single was released on May 21, 2008. The title track was used as the opening theme for the anime Kamen no Maid Guy. The single was sold as a regular edition (CD only) and a limited edition (CD+DVD) which contained the video for the title track.

== Track listing ==
1. "Special Life!"
  Composition/Arrangement: C.G mix
  Lyrics: Kotoko
2. "Capriccio: Kokoro wa Itsumo Kumori Nochi Hare"
  Composition/Arrangement: Maiko Iuchi
  Lyrics: Kotoko
3. "Special Life!" -instrumental-
4. "Capriccio: Kokoro wa Itsumo Kumori Nochi Hare" Instrumental

== Charts and sales ==
Oricon Ranking (Weekly)	Sales
13	14,502
