= Real Onigokko (song) =

Single by Kotoko

from the album Epsilon no Fune
- B-side: "Siren"
- Released: December 19, 2007
- Genre: J-pop
- Length: 24:37
- Label: Geneon
- Composer: Kazuya Takase
- Lyricist: Kotoko
- Producer: I've Sound

"Real Onigokko" (リアル鬼ごっこ) is Kotoko's tenth maxi single under Geneon Entertainment, released on December 19, 2007. The title track was used as the theme song for the Japanese science fiction thriller movie of the same title, launched in Japan in 2008, starring Takuya Ishida and Mitsuki Tanimura. Real onigokko means "real tag game" in English. The single peaked at the #15 position in the Oricon charts selling 7,588 units in its first week of release.

== Track listing ==
1. リアル鬼ごっこ / Real Onigokko—6:39
  Composition: Kazuya Takase
  Arrangement: Kazuya Takase
  Lyrics: Kotoko
2. Siren - 5:40
  Composition: Kazuya Takase
  Arrangement: Kazuya Takase
  Lyrics: Kotoko
3. リアル鬼ごっこ / Real Onigokko (Instrumental) -- 6:39
4. Siren (Instrumental) -- 5:39

== Charts and sales ==
Oricon Ranking (Weekly)	Sales
15	13,763
