= Being (Kotoko song) =

"being"

Single by Kotoko

from the album Uzu-Maki
- B-side: "Sekka no Shinwa"
- Released: March 23, 2006
- Genre: J-pop
- Length: 22:25
- Label: Geneon
- Songwriter: Kotoko
- Producer: I've Sound

Kotoko singles chronology
"421: A Will" (2005)	"being" (2006)	"Chercher" (2006)

"being" is the fifth single by Kotoko under Geneon Entertainment. The title track was used as the second opening theme for the anime series Shakugan no Shana. As of January 2014, this remains Kotoko's most successful single since it peaked at #4 in the Oricon charts and sold a total of 34,736 copies.

== Track listing ==
1. being—4:49
  Composition: Kotoko
  Arrangement: Kazuya Takase
  Lyrics: Kotoko
2. 雪華の神話 / Sekka no Shinwa—6:25
  Composition: Kazuya Takase
  Arrangement: Kazuya Takase
  Lyrics: Kotoko
3. being (Instrumental) -- 4:49
4. 雪華の神話 (Instrumental) / Sekka no Shinwa (Instrumental) -- 6:22

== Charts ==
The song peaked at #4 on the Oricon Japanese charts.
