= Tears Cyclone: Kai =

Studio album by Kotoko
- Released: June 27, 2018
- Genre: J-pop; dance-pop
- Length: 56:00:00
- Language: Japanese
- Label: NBCUniversal
- Producer: Kazuya Takase

Kotoko chronology
Kūchū Puzzle (2013)	Tears Cyclone: Kai (2018)	Tears Cyclone: Sei (2019)

Tears Cyclone: Kai (tears cyclone -廻-) is the title of Japanese singer Kotoko's seventh studio album. It was released on June 27, 2018, through NBCUniversal.

== Background information ==
Kotoko's first studio album in five years, this record is the first of the two Tears Cyclone albums released to commemorate Kotoko's fifteenth anniversary in music as a major artist. All the songs included in this album are the result of collaborations between Kotoko and Kazuya Takase, one of the founders of the I've group. The kai of the title is intended to mean "return", as Kotoko's return to her former music working with the I've group. Kotoko wrote the lyrics and also composed 3 of the songs; Takase composed the remaining songs.

The album had no commercial singles prior or after its release; however, the song "Sign of Suspicion" was previously released as the opening theme song for the videogame Baldr Heart. For the album she also recorded "A-gain", which was originally written for former singer Ray, who released the song as her sixth single in 2016.

== Tracklisting ==
All lyrics are written by Kotoko

CD
No.	Title	Music	Length
1.	"Nonfiction: Akuma no Sumu Wakusei" (悪魔の棲む惑星; The planet inhabited by the devil)	Kazuya Takase
2.	"Hibari" (雲雀; Skylark)	Kotoko
3.	"Natsukoi" (夏恋; Summer Love)	Kotoko
4.	"Onyx"	Takase
5.	"effacer"	Takase
6.	"Sign of Suspicion"	Takase
7.	"A-gain" (Kotoko ver.)	Takase
8.	"Kaiten Mokuba" (回転木馬; Merry-go-round)	Kotoko
9.	"Myuge no Hanataba o, Kimi e" (ミュゲの花束を、君へ; A bouquet of muguets for you)	Takase
10.	"Dusty Days"	Takase
11.	"Sakura Hakusho" (SA*KU*RA 白書; Cherry blossom white paper)	Takase
12.	"Kai: Ro-tation" (廻-Ro-tation)
