= Altima (band) =

Japanese musical group

- Origin: Japan
- Genres: Eurobeat; hip hop; synthpop; trance; J-pop; Anison
- Years active: 2011–2016, 2018
- Label: Warner Bros. Home Entertainment
- Past members: Motsu (Mototaka Segawa); Sat (Satoshi Yaginuma); Maon (Maon Kurosaki)
- Website: www.whv-amusic.com/altima/

Altima were a three-member Japanese synthpop band that formed in 2011 and was signed to Warner Bros. Home Entertainment. The band consists of rapper Motsu (Mototaka Segawa) from Move, composer Sat (Satoshi Yaginuma) from fripSide and singer Maon (Maon Kurosaki). Altima released their debut single "I'll Believe" in December 2011, which is used as the first ending theme to the anime Shakugan no Shana Final.

== Members ==
- Motsu: Mototaka Segawa (瀬川 素公, Segawa Mototaka) (composition, arrangement, rap vocals, programming, leader)
- Sat: Satoshi Yaginuma (八木沼 悟志, Yaginuma Satoshi) (composition, arrangement, sound production, synthesizer, keyboards, guitar, programming)
- Maon: Maon Kurosaki (lyrics, vocals)

== History ==
After initially becoming interested in the music of the trance and pop duo fripSide, Mototaka Segawa of the band Move approached fripSide's Satoshi Yaginuma at the Animelo Summer Live concert in August 2010 wanting to collaborate with him. Around the same time, Segawa took notice of Maon Kurosaki, who at the time had just released her debut album H.O.T.D. under Geneon in September 2010. Segawa contacted Kurosaki through Yaginuma, because fripSide is also under Geneon. When Yaginuma received the request to create an ending theme for the 2011 anime television series Shakugan no Shana Final, he thought this was the perfect chance to collaborate with Segawa and Kurosaki.

At the 2011 Animelo Summer Live concert on August 28, Altima officially announced their formation and performed their debut single "I'll Believe" as secret guest performers. The single for "I'll Believe" was released on December 7, 2011, which is used as the first ending theme to Shakugan no Shana Final. Altima's second single "One" was released on February 29, 2012, which is used as the second ending theme to Shakugan no Shana Final. Altima's third single "Burst the Gravity" was released on July 25, 2012, which is used as the second opening theme to the 2012 anime television Accel World. Altima released their fourth single "Fight 4 Real" on January 29, 2014, which is used as the second opening theme to the 2013 anime television Strike the Blood. Altima released their debut studio album Tryangle on March 26, 2014. Altima collaborated with the singer Kotoko in performing the song "Plasmic Fire" released on July 20, 2016; the song is used in the 2016 anime film Accel World: Infinite Burst.

== Discography ==
=== Albums ===
Year	Album details	Peak Oricon chart positions
2014	Tryangle: Released: March 26, 2014; Label: Warner Bros. Home Entertainment (1000477756, 1000478010); Format: CD	26

=== Singles ===
Year	Song	Peak Oricon chart positions	Album
2011	"I'll Believe"	20	Tryangle
2012	"One"	27	Tryangle
2012	"Burst the Gravity"	22	Tryangle
2014	"Fight 4 Real"	26	Tryangle

==== Collaborations ====
Year	Songs	Peak Oricon chart positions	Album
2016	"Plasmic Fire" (with Kotoko)	19	

=== Music videos ===
Year	Song	Director
2011	"I'll Believe"	
2012	"One"	
2012	"Burst the Gravity"	
2014	"Fight 4 Real"	
