= Re-sublimity =

- CD+DVD Edition

Single by Kotoko

from the album Garasu no Kaze
- B-side: "Agony"
- Released: November 17, 2004
- Genre: J-pop
- Length: 23:57
- Label: Geneon
- Composer: Kazuya Takase
- Lyricist: Kotoko
- Producer: I've Sound

Audio sample
- "Re-sublimity": file; help

Alternative cover
- CD only Edition

"Re-sublimity" is Kotoko's second maxi single under Geneon Entertainment, released on November 17, 2004. The title track was used as an opening theme for the anime series Kannazuki no Miko while "Agony", its B-side, was used as the ending theme. "Suppuration -core-" was used as a soundtrack for the anime and a rearrangement of the song "Suppuration" appears in her Hane Live Tour 2004 Limited Album. The single peaked at number eight on the Oricon charts and charted for 12 weeks. Since it sold 50,119 copies, this is considered Kotoko's best selling single.

The song later appeared on Kotoko's best hits album, Kotoko Anime's Compilation Best.

== Track listing ==
1. Re-sublimity – 5:19
  Composition: Kazuya Takase
  Arrangement: Kazuya Takase
  Lyrics: Kotoko
2. Agony – 4:22
  Composition: Tomoyuki Nakazawa
  Arrangement: Tomoyuki Nakazawa
  Lyrics: Kotoko
3. Suppuration -core- – 5:37
  Composition: Kazuya Takase
  Arrangement: Kazuya Takase
  Lyrics: Kotoko
4. Re-sublimity (Karaoke) – 5:18
5. Agony (Karaoke) – 4:21

== Charts and sales ==
Oricon Ranking (Weekly)	Sales
8	50,119
