= Light My Fire (Kotoko song) =

Single by Kotoko

from the album Kūchū Puzzle
- B-side: "Candy or Chocolate"
- Released: November 16, 2011
- Recorded: 2011
- Genre: J-pop
- Length: 17:46
- Label: Warner Home Video
- Songwriter: Ryo (of Supercell)

Kotoko singles chronology
"Loop-the-Loop" (2010)	"Light My Fire" (2011)	"Unfinished" (2012)

"Light My Fire" is Kotoko's 17th single released on November 16, 2011, under Warner Home Video. The A-side of the single was used as the opening of Shakugan no Shana Final. "Light My Fire" was written and composed by Ryo of Supercell. The single peaked at number 19 on Oricon Singles Chart.

== Track listing ==
No.	Title	Writer(s)	Arrangement	Length
1.	"Light My Fire"	Ryo of Supercell	Ryo	3:48
2.	"Candy or Chocolate?"	Dixie Flatline	Dixie Flatline	5:04
3.	"Light My Fire (Instrumental)"			3:48
4.	"Candy or Chocolate? (Instrumental)"			5:04
