= C.G mix =

Japanese musician

- Born: Shinji Hatakeyama (畠山慎司 Hatakeyama Shinji); January 11
- Genres: J-pop, trance, techno
- Occupations: Composer, Singer, Songwriter
- Years active: 1994 – present
- Label: Geneon Entertainment
- Website: North Web-music-

C.G mix (畠山慎司, Hatakeyama Shinji) is one of the main composers of the Japanese music production I've Sound.

The meaning of his name is "Communication Groove mix". C.G mix has already composed many songs for visual novel games and recently, anime theme songs for the I've Sound singers. Also a singer, he also performs songs for visual games but mostly for BL (Boy's Love) games. In 2001, he joined I've Sound and immediately became a composer and arranger of the group. He also features the use of rock music when creating his music but most of his songs are rather categorized as electronica.

== Chronology ==
At the age of 3, he already learned to play the piano and eventually after 4 years of stay in the primary school, he began composing songs. He debuted in the music industry with his song "Lunar Dance" in 1994. In 1996 his "Crazy for You" was released under Fuctory Records. In 2001 he joined I've Sound, participating in his first I've Sound concert, "I've in Budokan 2005: Open the Birth Gate" on October 15, 2005. He released his debut album, In Your Life, under Geneon Entertainment on July 14, 2006.

== Discography ==
=== Indies ===
- "Lunar Dance"
  – Original Mix (Lyrics: Ayumi Kida; Composition/Arrangement: C.G mix)
  – Special S.P.R. Mix (Lyrics: Ayumi Kida; Composition: C.G mix; Arrangement: S.P.R.)
- "Crazy for You"
  – Club Mix (Lyrics: Ayumi Kida; Composition: C.G mix; Arrangement: Kazuya Takase)
  – 80's Burst Mix (Lyrics: Ayumi Kida; Composition/Arrangement: C.G mix)
  – Floor Style Instrumental (Lyrics: Ayumi Kida; Composition/Arrangement: C.G mix)
- "Miokurukara: Metamorphose" (Lyrics: Ayumi Kida; Composition/Arrangement: C.G mix) (Published on web only)

==== In Your Life ====
Released July 14, 2006

CD track listing

1. Sky was g-ray
  Lyrics: Ayumi Kida
  Composition: C.G mix
  Arrangement: Kazuya Takase
2. E.I.E.N
  Lyrics: Ayumi Kida
  Composition/Arrangement: C.G mix
3. version up
  Lyrics: Ayumi Kida
  Composition/Arrangement: C.G mix
4. Point
  Lyrics: Ayumi Kida
  Composition/Arrangement: C.G mix
5. Detect
  Lyrics: Ayumi Kida
  Composition/Arrangement: C.G mix
6. distress
  Lyrics: Ayumi Kida
  Composition/Arrangement: C.G mix
7. Aozora wo Machi Nagara
  Lyrics: Masahiro Sato
  Composition/Arrangement: C.G mix
8. preserve
  Lyrics: Ayumi Kida
  Composition/Arrangement: C.G mix
9. Please turn over
  Lyrics: Ayumi Kida
  Composition/Arrangement: C.G mix
10. Miokuru Kara
  Lyrics: Ayumi Kida
  Composition/Arrangement: C.G mix
11. in your life
  Lyrics: Ayumi Kida
  Composition/Arrangement: C.G mix
12. Welcome to Heaven! -in your life version-
  Lyrics: AIS
  Composition/Arrangement: C.G mix

==== Pray ====
Released April 29, 2009

CD track listing

1. under the darkness
  Lyrics: A.I.
  Composition: C.G mix
  Arrangement: C.G mix, Takeshi Ozaki
2. Everything is assumed to be connected
  Lyrics: Masashi Sato
  Composition/Arrangement: C.G mix
3. judge
  Lyrics: Ayumi Kida
  Composition/Arrangement: C.G mix
4. Kaze wo Ukete (風をうけて)
  Lyrics: Ayumi Kida
  Composition/Arrangement: C.G mix
5. DAY IN
  Lyrics: Ayumi Kida
  Composition/Arrangement: C.G mix
6. flat
7. Lyrics/Composition/Arrangement: C.G mix
8. Face of Fact
  Lyrics: KOTOKO
  Composition/Arrangement: C.G mix
9. Swept Away
  Lyrics: Masashi Sato
  Composition/Arrangement: C.G mix
10. Hasen no Shirushi (破線の標)
  Lyrics: Ayumi Kida
  Composition/Arrangement: C.G mix
11. pray
  Lyrics: Masashi Sato
  Composition/Arrangement: C.G mix
12. BLUE
  Lyrics: Ayumi Kida
  Composition/Arrangement: C.G mix
13. under the darkness -four piece band mix-
  Lyrics: A.I.
  Composition: C.G mix
  Arrangement: C.G mix, Takeshi Ozaki

DVD track listing

1. under the darkness (Promotional Video)

=== Other songs ===
1. Welcome to Heaven! (学園ヘヴン！ PS2版)
2. Welcome to Heaven! -Remix- (学園ヘヴン おかわりっ!)
3. Under the Darkness (鬼畜眼鏡)
4. Under the Darkness -Remix- (鬼畜眼鏡R)
5. True Eyes (STEAL!)
