= Maiko Iuchi =

Japanese composer and arranger

Maiko Iuchi 井内舞子
- Also known as: Miu Uetsu (羽越 実有)
- Born: January 2 Hiroshima, Japan
- Genres: J-pop, electronic, film score
- Occupations: Composer, arranger, producer
- Instrument: Keyboard
- Years active: 2002–present

Maiko Iuchi (井内 舞子, Iuchi Maiko; born January 2) is a Japanese composer and arranger. Much of her work is for video games and anime.

== Biography ==
Iuchi was born in Hiroshima. She learned piano and percussion from a young age. As a high school student, she performed as a drummer in various bands. She graduated from the music design program at the Kunitachi College of Music and began her career working for video game hardware and software company SNK. In 2002, she left SNK to work for music production group I've as an outsource affiliate. In 2013 she became a full time employee at I've. In 2017 she retired from her full time position at the company but remained as a partner.

As a composer, she has written music for many video games and anime series including the A Certain Magical Index series, A Certain Scientific Railgun series, WIXOSS series, and Rewrite.

== Discography ==
=== Game works ===
| Title | Year | Role(s) |
|---|---|---|
| Shinjin Kangofu Miho | 2002 | Composer (as Miu Uetsu) |
| Mugen no Meikyuu 3 Type S | 2003 | Composer (as Miu Uetsu) |
| Ryoujoku Seifuku Jogakuen ~Chimitsu ni Nureta Seifuku~ | 2003 | Composer (as Miu Uetsu) |
| Aneimo ~Ai to H no Step Up~ | 2004 | Composer (as Miu Uetsu) |
| Miko Mai ~Tada Hitotsu no Negai~ | 2004 | Composer (as Miu Uetsu) (other tracks by Tomoyuki Nakazawa) |
| Immoral | 2004 | Composer (as Miu Uetsu) |
| Nee, Chanto Shiyou Yo! 2 | 2004 | Composer |
| Tsuyokiss | 2005 | Composer (as Miu Uetsu) |
| Ace Combat X: Skies of Deception | 2006 | Composer (other tracks by Akira Yamasaki, Hitoshi Akiyama and Seiji Koike) |
| Aneimo 2 ~Second Stage~ | 2007 | Composer |
| Soshite Ashita no Sekai yori | 2007 | Composer |
| Fuyu no Rondo | 2008 | Composer |
| Futa Ane ~Bitter & Sweet~ | 2010 | Composer |
| Rewrite | 2011 | Composer (other tracks by Soshi Hosoi, Ryo Mizutsuki, and Shinji Orito) |
| Rewrite Harvest festa! | 2012 | Composer (other tracks by Soshi Hosoi, Ryo Mizutsuki, Shinji Orito and Yuichiro Tsukagoshi) |
| Hatsukoi 1/1 | 2012 | Composer (other tracks by MANYO, Ryo Mizutsuki, Donmaru and Shoyu) |

=== Anime works ===
| Title | Year | Role(s) |
|---|---|---|
| Sister Princess ~Re Pure~ | 2002 | Composer (as Miu Uetsu) (other tracks by Shinya Watabe and Tomoyuki Nakazawa) |
| A Certain Magical Index | 2008 | Composer |
| A Certain Scientific Railgun | 2009 | Composer |
| A Certain Magical Index II | 2010 | Composer |
| Dog Days | 2011 | Composer |
| Dog Days 2nd | 2012 | Composer |
| Waiting in the Summer | 2012 | Composer |
| A Certain Magical Index: The Movie – The Miracle of Endymion | 2013 | Composer |
| A Certain Scientific Railgun S | 2013 | Composer |
| Tokyo Ravens | 2013 | Composer |
| Selector Infected Wixoss | 2014 | Composer |
| Selector Spread Wixoss | 2014 | Composer |
| Heavy Object | 2015 | Composer (other tracks by Keiji Inai) |
| Lostorage Incited Wixoss | 2016 | Composer |
| Rewrite | 2016 | Composer (other tracks by Soshi Hosoi, Ryo Mizutsuki, Shinji Orito, and Yuichiro Tsukagoshi) |
| And You Thought There Is Never a Girl Online? | 2016 | Composer |
| Selector Destructed Wixoss | 2016 | Composer |
| Rewrite 2nd Season | 2017 | Composer (other tracks by Soshi Hosoi, Ryo Mizutsuki, Shinji Orito, and Yuichiro Tsukagoshi) |
| Lostorage Conflated Wixoss | 2018 | Composer |
| Hakyū Hōshin Engi | 2018 | Composer |
| A Certain Magical Index III | 2018 | Composer |
| RErideD: Derrida, who leaps through time | 2018 | Composer |
| A Certain Scientific Accelerator | 2019 | Composer |
| A Certain Scientific Railgun T | 2020 | Composer |
| Akudama Drive | 2020 | Composer (other tracks by Shigekazu Aida) |
| A Certain Dark Item | 2026 | Composer |
