= Kotoko (musician) =

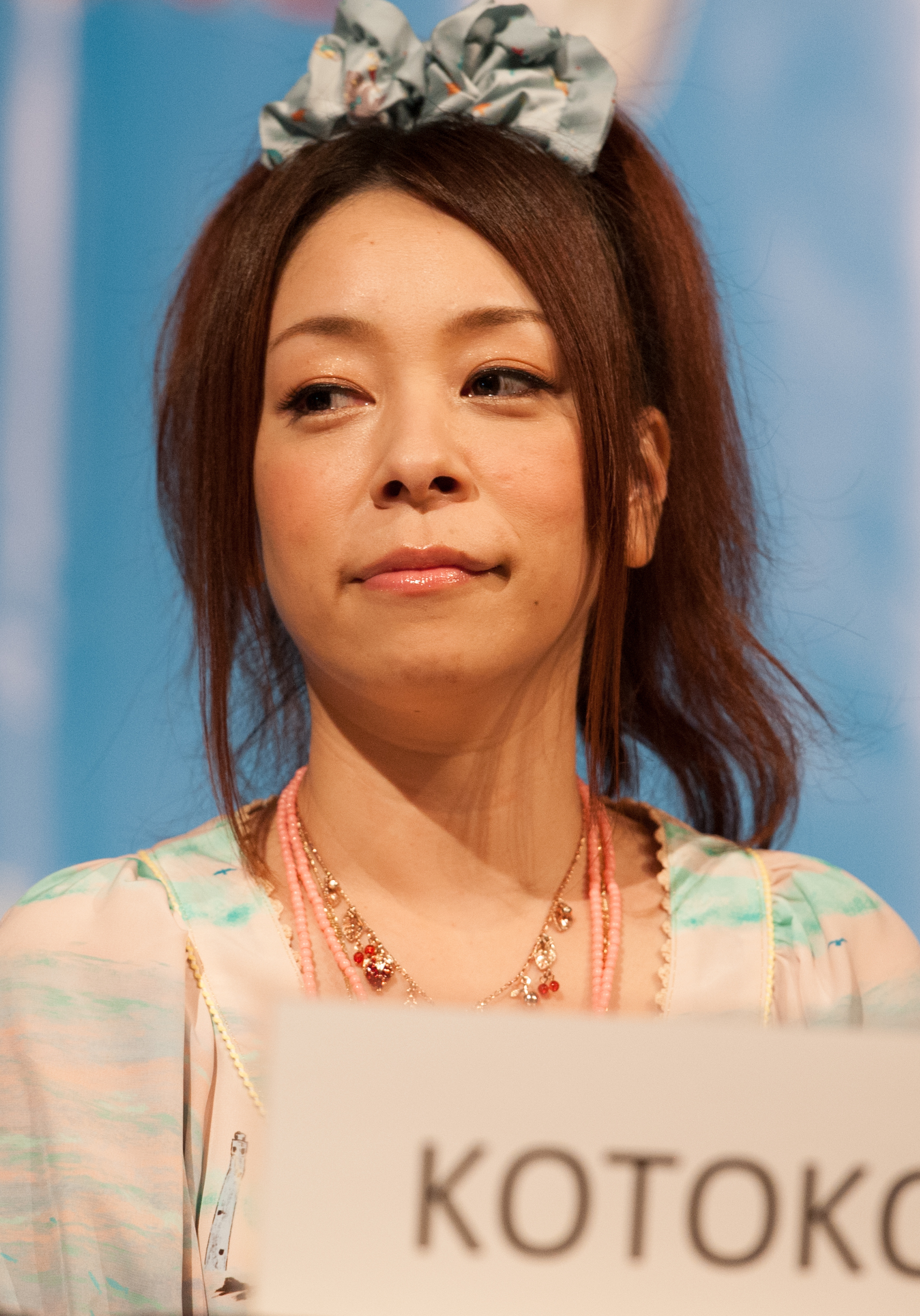
- Kotoko at Animazement in 2012

Background information
- Born: 石田琴子; Ishida Kotoko; January 19 (Note: Year of birth unknown); Sapporo, Hokkaido, Japan
- Genres: J-pop; trance; techno
- Occupations: Musician; singer; songwriter
- Instrument: Vocals
- Years active: 2000–present
- Labels: Rondorobe (2004–2010); Warner Home Video (2011–2018); NBCUniversal Entertainment Japan (2018–present)
- Website: kotoko.asia

Kotoko (stylized as KOTOKO, born January 19) is a Japanese J-pop musician, singer, and songwriter from Sapporo, Hokkaido. She began her singing career in 2000, debuting as a member of the trance group I've Sound and releasing her first mini-album Sora o Tobetara that same year. She was then signed to the Rondorobe record label from 2004 to 2010, under which she released the albums Hane, Garasu no Kaze, Uzu-Maki and Epsilon no Fune. She signed to Warner Home Video in 2011, and remained with the label until 2018. She is currently signed with NBCUniversal Entertainment Japan.

Kotoko composes and writes lyrics (for herself as well as other singers in I've Sound) for numerous other song collections. She has contributed songs to numerous anime and video games including Please Teacher!, Maria-sama ga Miteru, Hourglass of Summer, Hayate the Combat Butler, Kannazuki no Miko, Shakugan no Shana, BlazBlue: Calamity Trigger, To Love-Ru, Accel World, Phantasy Star Online, Argevollen and Baldr Sky among others.

== Life and career ==
From elementary school, Kotoko believed her career would be influenced by her voice and tried to involve herself in as many auditions as possible. In addition to regular education, she attended courses at the music school Haura where she polished her musical talents.

Kotoko became a professional singer in 2000. Her first successful audition was with I've Sound, a team of producers using the talents of various female vocalists for their productions — best recognized for their many dating sim and eroge game soundtracks. She released her first album Sora o Tobetara (空を飛べたら, I Can Fly) in 2000. Many of the tracks on this album were later re-recorded for her first I've Sound album, Hane (羽 -hane-, Feather), which is officially considered her first album. Her first I've Sound CD appearance was on the CD "Dear Feeling" sold in Comiket 59, together with singer Aki. She then appeared on the album Disintegration, a collection of various songs from I've Sound's singers. Since then, she has performed opening and ending themes for a few anime and has gained significant recognition from her two I've Sound-related album releases.

Her second album, Garasu no Kaze, released in June 2005 has been praised within multiple online communities. On October 13, 2005, she released her fourth maxi single, which featured a song from her Garasu no Kaze (硝子の靡風) album, "421: A Will" and its B-side song "Shūsō" (秋爽, The Refreshing Autumn Breeze), which is featured in her third album, Uzu-Maki. Her first official performance in North America was her highly successful American concert debut at Anime Expo 2005, soon followed by the Kotoko Lax Tour. In 2009, she wrote the song "Screw" for the Mamoru Oshii live-action movie Assault Girls. The song "Ao (Iconoclast)" (蒼-Iconoclast) was featured as the opening theme song to the console version of video game Blazblue: Calamity Trigger, and her song "Hekira no Sora e Izanaedo" was used as the opening theme for the BlazBlue sequel BlazBlue: Continuum Shift.

Her 17th single "Light My Fire" was written by Ryo of Supercell and was used as the first opening theme to the 2011 anime series Shakugan no Shana Final. She also appeared at the Animazement anime convention in 2012 and returned to the event in 2014. She collaborated with the band Altima in performing the song "Plasmic Fire", which is used in the anime film Accel World: Infinite Burst. She collaborated with Luna Haruna on the song "SxW (Soul World)"; the song is used as the theme song to the video game Accel World VS Sword Art Online: Millennium Twilight. In February 2018, she announced that she was returning to Geneon, now known as NBCUniversal Entertainment Japan. She released an album titled Tears Cyclone in June 2018.

In 2021, she released the song "Internet Overdose", which was used in the video game Needy Streamer Overload.

== Discography ==
- 2000: Sora o Tobetara
- 2004: Hane
- 2005: Garasu no Kaze
- 2006: Uzu-Maki
- 2009: Epsilon no Fune
- 2011: Hiraku Uchū Pocket
- 2013: Kūchū Puzzle
- 2018: Tears Cyclone: Kai
- 2019: Tears Cyclone: Sei
- 2022: Sweet Cyclone: Yay
