= I've Sound =

Japanese techno/trance music production group

I've logo

I've Sound, or simply called I've (アイブ, Aibu), is a Japanese techno/trance music production group based in Sapporo, Hokkaidō, Japan. Led by Kazuya Takase, it features the talents of seasoned "sound creators" and many different vocalists, known as utahime (歌姫) to their fans.

They have created the theme songs for many Japanese adult games. More recently, they have been creating the theme songs to anime series. Among anime fans, I've Sound is well known for providing the theme songs to such series as the Please! franchise (Please Teacher! and Please Twins!), Kanon, Air, Kannazuki no Miko, Black Lagoon, the Shakugan no Shana series, Starship Operators, Higurashi no Naku Koro ni, the Hayate the Combat Butler series, Nanatsuiro Drops, A Certain Magical Index, Rideback, Sky Girls, High School DxD, Jormungand, Tokyo Ravens, To Love-Ru series, Waiting in the Summer, Nagi-Asu: A Lull in the Sea, Aokana: Four Rhythm Across the Blue and Girly Air Force.

== History ==
I've was founded in 1998 by members of the six-member Takase Fight. During this time they produced music for tsushin karaoke and adult game brands based in Hokkaidō. They also made two tracks for the Dancemania series, "If You Were Here" by Jennifer and "Is This The Way You Kill A Love" by Gina, both featured in Dance Dance Revolution.

They first assumed the name "I've" while working on the eroge Lips: egao no yukue in the autumn of 1998. Although production for the game was later cancelled, they were able to establish ties with Visual Art's, a computer game and software maker that most of I've's subsequent works are released under.

The first game I've produced music for was Hakidame: Trash, produced by Zero (a brand of Visual Art's), released in February 1999, where they were credited as I've Sound. The game featured the songs "Fuck Me" and "Utsukushiku Ikitai".

I've's big break came when the popular PC game Kanon by Key was released in 1999, featuring the theme songs "Last Regrets" and "Kaze no Tadoritsuku Basho", both arranged by I've. This gained them a burst of fame among eroge gamers. These songs were later used as insert songs during Kanon's 2002 anime adaptation, and later as the main opening and ending themes in that anime's 2006 remake.

They released their first compilation album, Regret in December 1999.

In 2002, I've was hired to produce the music for their first anime series, Please Teacher!, which helped to further spread their name among otaku, and exposed them internationally.

In April 2004, Kotoko, one of I've's vocalists who worked on Please Teacher, made her major debut with the album Hane. This was followed by Mami Kawada's major debut single "Radiance" single in February 2005, and Eiko Shimamiya's Ulysses album the same year in April. Mell and sound creator C.G mix made their major releases in 2006 (Red Fraction single and In Your Life album respectively). Most recently, Kaori Utatsuki also joined the ranks in August 2007 with the single Shining Stars Bless.

I've held their first concert on October 15, 2005, at Nippon Budokan.

In 2012, Mami Kawada released her fourth album, Square the Circle including her last singles used as theme songs for the anime A Certain Magical Index and the third season of Shakugan no Shana. Larval Stage Planning released their second single, which was used as the opening song for High School DxD. In August 2012, a new volume of the Girls compilation series was released, and MAKO, a vocalist who had been a guest singer of the group twelve years before, made a surprising return.

In 2013 and after having suffered an unknown disease, MELL left I've Sound and released a compilation album of her most successful songs. Kaori Utatsuki released "Going on", her second mini album and also announced her retirement. Larval Stage Planning released "Sympathy" the opening theme song for the second season of High School DxD, and also announced that they were preparing their first album.

In 2014, Nami Maisaki and Rin Asami announced their graduation from I've Sound, leaving Larval Stage Planning only with Airi Kirishima, as a solo project. However, in the end of the year, an unexpected turnaround was announced, when Nami Maisaki returned to the group as the new Sound Creator, now stylized as NAMI. In the same year, IKU signed with I've, now as an Official I've Girl, and also three new singers called RINA, Minori Kitamura and marriage blue were presented at Comiket Market 87, with the "I've MANIA TRACKS NEW WAVE" release. Although only RINA has been confirmed as a member of the group, marriage blue remains in business with I've as a partnership.

In 2016, Mami Kawada, the last of the first generation of I've singers, announced her retirement from singing, and started her works as composer, outside I've. On the same year, IKU released a new single, called "Kimi no Namae". The three songs were composed by herself and arranged by Kazuya Takase and Takeshi Ozaki.

In 2017, Sound Creators Takeshi Ozaki, Maiko Iuchi and Tomoyuki Nakazawa left I've too. In the same year, I've released its 10th I've Girls Compilation, entitled "ALIVE". Also, YUZUNO, RINA and marriage blue made their debuts with the singles "Light and dark", "Shine your light" and "§-section-", respectively.

In 2018, IKU released her third album on March 30, called "TERMINAL", her first entirely produced by I've. On July 11, C.G mix released a single called "daybreak", and also, on August 18, YUZUNO and RINA each released their second single, called "Luminous" and "Laboratory", respectively. On December, I've announced two new singers: Asuka Sato and Leina. It was also announced Yuzuno's graduation from I've Sound, with a memorial album called "PINK POISON" to be released in March 2019.

In 2019, I've followed major releases under its own label. C.G mix released his third album "ADVANCE" and a self-cover mini-album "the other side", Asuka Sato made her debut with the EP "D＊ BACKUP" and Leina released her second EP "NOISE". Also, RINA got her first anime tie-up song "awake from the deep", which was an insert song for the fourth episode of Girly Air Force. On July 30, she released her first album "PRISMATICA". In the same year, Airi Kirishima left the group.

In 2020, Asuka Sato is going to release her second EP "CROSSOVER", on February 7.

== Sound creators ==
Member	Joined	Left
Kazuya Takase (高瀬一矢) – the founder of I've Sound	1999	Current member
Tomoyuki Nakazawa (中沢伴行)	1999	2017, partnership
Atsuhiko Nakatsubo (中坪淳彦) – also known as FISH TONE	2000	2005
C.G mix – works as sound creator and singer	2001	Current member
wata (also known as NueroSocietia, worked in I've as an outsource)	2002	2004
Maiko Iuchi (井内舞子) – also known as Miu Uetsu	2002	2017, partner ship
Takeshi Ozaki (尾崎武士)	2005	2017
NAMI (Nami Maisaki / 舞崎なみ) – started as singer in 2010 with Larval Stage Planning and became Sound Creator in 2014	2010	Current member

== Singers ==
I've Official Singers	Joined	Left
MELL	1999	2013
AKI	1999	2001
Eiko Shimamiya (島みやえい子)	1999	2011
SHIHO	2000	2006
KOTOKO	2000	2011
MOMO (Hitomi Momoi / モモイヒトミ)	2001	2006
Mami Kawada (川田まみ)	2001	2017, partner ship
Kaori Utatsuki (詩月カオリ)	2002	2013
Reina (怜奈)	2004	2006
Airi Kirishima (桐島愛里) - Larval Stage Planning sole member.	2009	2019
Rin Asami (朝見琳)	2010	2014
Yuzuno (柚子乃)	2013	2019
IKU	2014	Current member
RINA	2014	Current member
Asuka Sato (佐藤アスカ)	2018	Current member
Leina	2018	Current member

Long-term Guests & Partnerships	Joined	Left
Ayana (彩菜)	1999	2004
Lia	2000	2005
MAKO	2000 2011	2004 2015
Maon Kurosaki	2010	2023
marriage blue	2014	Still working with I've
Ray	2011	2017

== Discography ==
=== Girls Compilation albums ===
- regret (1999)
- verge (2000)
- disintegration (2002)
- Lament (2003)
- Out Flow (2003)
- Collective (2005)
- EXTRACT (2010)
- LEVEL OCTAVE (2012)
- Evidence nine (2014)
- The Time - Twelve Colors (2016)
- ALIVE (2017)

=== Concept albums ===
- Short Circuit (2003)
- Short Circuit II (2007)
- Short Circuit III (2010)

=== Comic Market releases ===
- Dirty Gift (2002)
- Mixed Up: I've Remix Style (2004)
- I've Mania Tracks Vol.I (2007)
- The Front Line Covers (2008)
- I've Mania Tracks Vol.II (2009)
- I've Mania Tracks Vol.III (2010)

=== Other CDs ===
- I've Hard Stuff - Luding Out
- I've Cure Trance Vol.1 - Psychedelic
- I've Cure Trance Vol.2 - Psychedelic GOA
- I've Trance Magic Vol.1
- I've Trance Magic Vol.2
- I've Trance Magic Vol.3
- I've verve - circle001 - Beyond the underground groove (?)
- I've verve - circle002 - beat spellbound-agitation mix (?)
- I've verve - circle003 - electronica-mayhem (?)
- I've verve - circle004 - Psychedelic Trance Edition (?)
- I've verve - circle005 - Psychedelic Trance Edition - Journey of Space Exploration -
- I've Cure Trance Vol.3 - Psychedelic IBIZA
- Master Groove Circle (2008)
- I've Sound 10th Anniversary: Departed to the future Special CD Box (2009)
- Master Groove Circle 2 (2009)
- I've Sound 10th Anniversary Departed to the Future (2009)

=== Videos ===
- I've in Budokan 2005: Open the Birth Gate (2006)
- Short Circuit II Premium Show in Tokyo (2007)
- I've in Budokan 2009: Departed to the future (2009)
