= Mami Kawada discography =

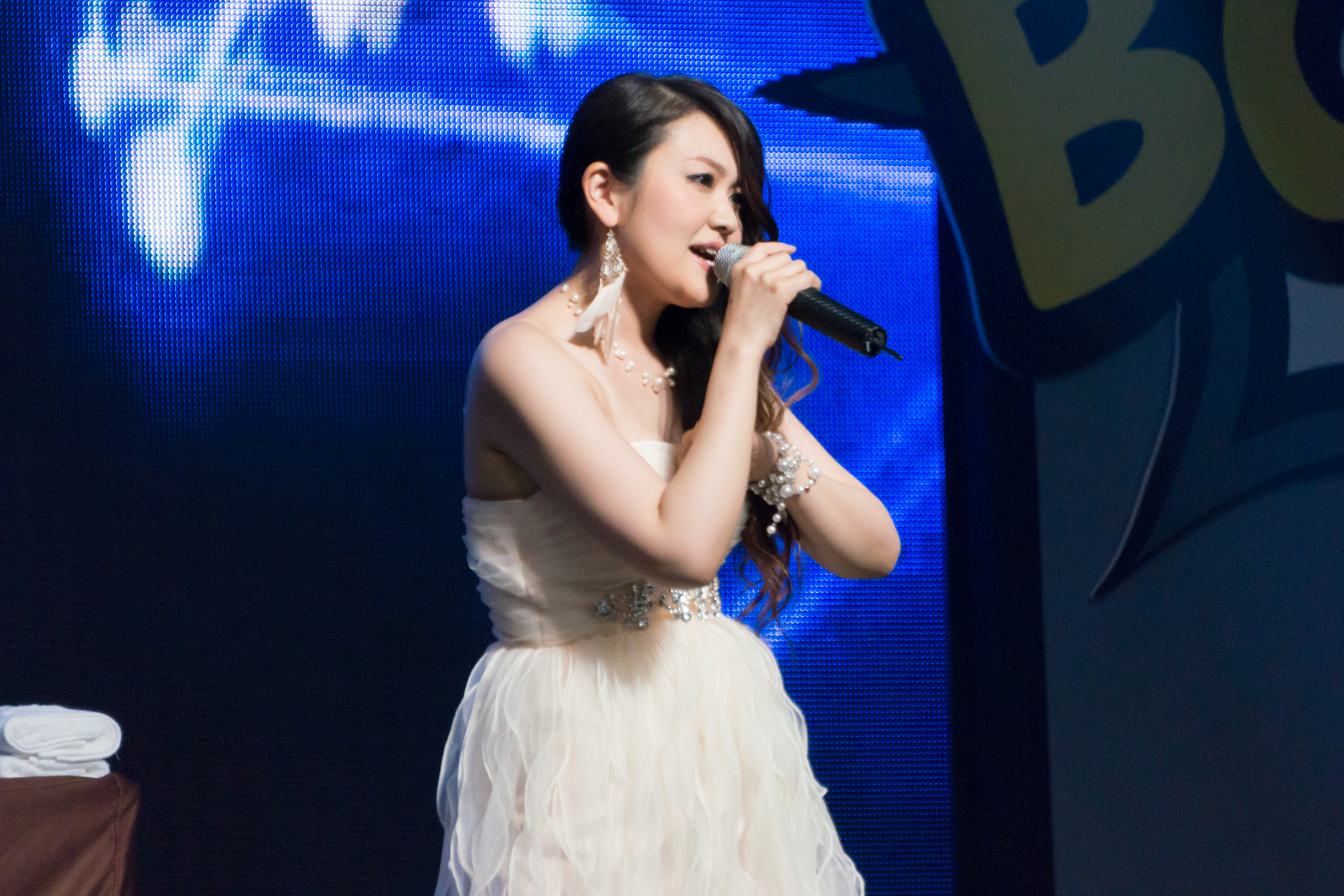
- Kawada at Bangkok Comic Com in 2014
- Studio albums: 4
- Compilation albums: 1
- Singles: 16
- Video albums: 2

The discography of Japanese singer Mami Kawada consists of four studio albums, one compilation albums, two video albums and sixteen singles. Kawada debuted as a singer as a part of the I've Sound anime and game soundtrack production group, beginning to release music for game and anime soundtracks from 2001. After signing with Geneon Entertainment, Kawada released her debut single "Radiance" in 2005, a split single also featuring fellow I've Sound musician Kotoko's "Chi ni Kaeru (On the Earth)". Kawada released her debut album Seed in 2006.

== Studio albums ==
List of albums, with selected chart positions
| Title | Album details | Peak positions | Sales (JPN) (Note: Sales provided by Oricon database and are rounded to the nearest thousand copies.) |
| Title | Album details | JPN | Sales (JPN) |
|---|---|---|---|
| Seed | Released: March 29, 2006 (JPN); Label: Geneon; Formats: CD, digital download | 12 | 25,000 |
| Savia | Released: March 26, 2008 (JPN); Label: Geneon; Formats: CD, digital download | 12 | 15,000 |
| Linkage | Released: March 24, 2010 (JPN); Label: Geneon Universal Entertainment; Formats: CD, digital download | 26 | 9,000 |
| Square the Circle | Released: August 8, 2012 (JPN); Label: Geneon Universal; Formats: CD, digital download | 22 | 7,000 |
| Parablepsia | Released: September 16, 2015 (JPN); Label: Geneon Universal; Formats: CD, digital download | 43 | 3,000 |

== Compilation albums ==
List of albums, with selected chart positions
| Title | Album details | Peak positions | Sales (JPN) |
| Title | Album details | JPN | Sales (JPN) |
|---|---|---|---|
| Mami Kawada Best: Birth | Released: February 13, 2013 (JPN); Label: Geneon; Formats: CD, digital download | 15 | 11,000 |

== Singles ==
List of singles, with selected chart positions
| Title | Year | Peak chart positions | | Sales (JPN) | Album |
| Title | Year | JPN Oricon (Note: Additional sources for chart positions are as follows: "Sora no Mori de", "Radiance", "Tenjō o Kakeru Monotachi", I've in Budokan 2005: Open the Birth Gate, I've in Budokan 2009: Departed to the Future.) | JPN Hot 100 (Note: Sources for chart positions are as follows: "No Buts!", "See Visions", "Borderland", "Contrail (Kiseki)".) | Sales (JPN) | Album |
|---|---|---|---|---|---|
| "Sora no Mori de" (空の森で; "In the Sky Forest") (Note: Released as a split single, with the leading track being Kotoko's "Shooting Star" single.) | 2002 | 62 | — | 17,000 | 'Onegai Teacher' Vocal Album: Stokesia |
| "Radiance" (Note: Released as a split single, also featuring Kotoko's "Chi ni Kaeru (On the Earth)".) | 2005 | 19 | — | 29,000 | Seed |
| "Hishoku no Sora" (緋色の空; "Scarlet-colored Sky") | 2005 | 11 | — | 37,000 | Seed |
| "Akai Namida" (赤い涙; "Red Tears") | 2007 | 21 | — | 10,000 | Savia |
| "Beehive" | 2007 | 21 | — | 10,000 | Savia |
| "Get My Way!" | 2007 | 27 | — | 12,000 | Savia |
| "Joint" | 2007 | 9 | — | 37,000 | Savia |
| "PSI-Missing" | 2008 | 14 | — (Note: Charted at number 18 on the Hot Singles Sales chart.) | 21,000 | Linkage |
| "Masterpiece" | 2009 | 12 | — (Note: Charted at number 22 on the Hot Singles Sales chart.) | 14,000 | Linkage |
| "L'Oiseau bleu" | 2009 | 113 | — | 700 | I've Sound 10th Anniversary |
| "Prophecy" | 2009 | 34 | — (Note: Charted at number 45 on the Hot Singles Sales chart.) | 5,000 | Linkage |
| "No Buts!" | 2010 | 6 | 70 | 25,000 | Square the Circle |
| "See Visions" | 2011 | 14 | 77 | 18,000 | Square the Circle |
| "Serment" | 2012 | 16 | — (Note: Charted at number 16 on the Hot Singles Sales chart.) | 7,000 | Square the Circle |
| "Borderland" | 2012 | 12 | 93 | 13,000 | Mami Kawada Best: Birth / Parablepsia |
| "Fixed Star" | 2013 | 26 | — (Note: Charted at number 30 on the Hot Singles Sales chart.) | 6,000 | Mami Kawada Best: Birth |
| "Break a Spell" | 2014 | 63 | — (Note: Charted at number 64 on the Hot Singles Sales chart.) | 2,000 | Parablepsia |
| "Gardens" | 2015 | 70 | — (Note: Charted at number 81 on the Hot Singles Sales chart.) | 2,000 | Non-album singles |
| "Contrail (Kiseki)" (軌跡; "Track") | 2016 | 39 | 85 | 4,000 | Non-album singles |
"—" denotes items which were released before the creation of the Billboard Japan Hot 100, or items that did not chart.

=== As a collaborating artist ===
List of singles, with selected chart positions
| Title | Year | Peak chart positions | | Sales (JPN) | Album |
| Title | Year | JPN Oricon | JPN Hot 100 | Sales (JPN) | Album |
|---|---|---|---|---|---|
| "Tenjō o Kakeru Monotachi" (天壌を翔る者たち; "Those Who Soar Over Heaven and Earth") (among Love Planet Five) | 2007 | 12 | — | 27,000 | Film Shakugan no Shana Original Soundtrack |
| "Orpheus (Kimi to Kanaderu Ashita e no Uta)" (Orpheus ～君と奏でる明日へのうた～; "A Song I Play with You for Tomorrow") (Lia / Aoi Tada / Mami Kawada / Eiko Shimamiya / Kotoko / Kaori Utatsuki / Chata / Rita / LiSA) | 2012 | — | — (Note: Charted at number 53 on the Billboard independent albums and singles chart.) | | Non-album single |
"—" denotes items which were released before the creation of the Billboard Japan Hot 100, or items that did not chart.

== Other appearances ==
List of other appearances that feature Mami Kawada
| Title | Year | Album |
|---|---|---|
| "Kaze to Kimi o Daite" (風と君を抱いて; "I Hold You and the Wind") | 2001 | Crowd Fan Box Plus Miss You (bonus CD) |
| "Ame ni Utau Ballad (A Rainbow After the Rain)" (雨に歌う譚詩曲; "A Ballad Sung in the Rain") (Note: Originally featured in the game Ame ni Utau Ballad (2002), released to CD in 2003.) (among Healing Leaf) | 2002 | Lament |
| "I Pray to Stop My Cry (Little Sea Style)" | 2002 | Ryōjoku Chikan Jigoku (bonus CD) |
| "Wind and Wander" (Note: Originally featured in the game Silvern: Gin no Tsuki, Mayoi no Mori (2002), released to CD in 2003.) | 2002 | Out Flow |
| "Dakishimete Itooshiku Utsukushiku" (抱きしめて 愛おしく 美しく; "Hold Me, Lovingly, Beautifully") (Note: Originally featured in the game Tearful Eyes: Anata Shika Inai (2002). Song distributed by the game's distribution company Kamen Shōkai online.) | 2002 | |
| "Akikaze ni Kimi o Omou" (秋風に君を想ふ; "Thinking of You in the Autumn Breeze") (among Healing Leaf) | 2002 | Carnaval |
| "Tiny Days" | 2002 | 'Onegai Teacher' Vocal Album: Stokesia |
| "Magnolia" (NueroSocietia featuring Mami Kawada) | 2002 | ...Split |
| "Rage" (as I've Diva) | 2003 | Verve Circle 001: Beyond the Underground Groove |
| "Asu e no Namida" (明日への涙; "Tears to Tomorrow") | 2003 | "Second Flight" (Kotoko and Hiromi Satō single) |
| "See You (Chiisa na Eien) (P.V Ver.)" (小さな永遠; "Tears to Tomorrow") (among I've Special Unit) | 2003 | I've P.V Collection Vol.3: See You |
| "Lythrum" | 2003 | Gibo Shimai DVD Special Edition (Special edition bonus CD) |
| "Rage (GMS Remix)" (as I've Diva) | 2004 | Verve-Circle Psychedelic Trance Edition 4 |
| "Immoral" | 2004 | Immoral (bonus CD) |
| "Eclipse" | 2004 | Ringetsu Mini Fan Disc (first press bonus CD) |
| "Onaji Sora no Shita de (Mixed Up Ver.)" (同じ空の下で; "Under the Same Sky") | 2004 | Mixed Up |
| "Fair Heaven" (among I've Special Unit) (Note: Special single attached to tickets for the I've in Budokan 2005: Open the Birth Gate concert.) | 2005 | |
| "Slow Step" (among Healing Leaf) | 2005 | Slow Step Original Soundtrack |
| "Vacillate" (Note: Originally released in the game Futari no Aniyome (2005). Released on CD in 2006 on the bonus soundtrack to the game Tsuma Mix and given a wide release on the I've album Extract (2010).) | 2005 | Tsuma Mix Vocal Collection |
| "Undelete" | 2006 | "Face of Fact (Resolution Ver.)" (Kotoko single) |
| "Eclipse (Uetsu Miu Style)" | 2006 | Tsuma Mix Vocal Collection |
| "Roots of Roots" (Note: Special CD attached to the pamphlet sold at Kawada's 2006 live tour.) | 2006 | |
| "Carpe Diem" | 2006 | |
| "The Maze" | 2006 | Double Solid (first press bonus CD) |
| "Melty Snow" | 2007 | AneImo 2 (first press bonus CD) |
| "Seduce" | 2007 | Shakkin Shimai (limited edition bonus CD) |
| "For Our Days" | 2007 | Soshite Asu no Sekai Yori (limited edition bonus soundtrack) |
| "Return to that Place" | 2007 | Soshite Asu no Sekai Yori (limited edition bonus soundtrack) |
| "My Friend" | 2008 | Magical Girl Lyrical Nanoha StrikerS Original Soundtracks |
| "Trill (Shiva Joerg Remix)" | 2008 | Master Groove Circle |
| "Immoral (Sorma No. 1 Remix)" | 2008 | Master Groove Circle |
| "Radiance (Joybasu Remix)" | 2008 | Master Groove Circle |
| "Hydian Way" (Note: Special single attached to tickets for the I've in Budokan 2009: Departed to the Future concert.) (among Love Planet Five) | 2008 | |
| "Ride" | 2009 | The Front Line Covers |
| "Days of Promise" | 2009 | The Front Line Covers |
| "Birthday Eve" | 2009 | The Front Line Covers |
| "Platinum" | 2009 | Mechamimi (first press bonus DVD) |
| "PSI-Missing (DJ Shiva Joerg Remix)" | 2009 | Master Groove Circle 2 |
| "Jellyfish (Mazda a.k.a. Shine6 remix)" | 2009 | Master Groove Circle 2 |
| "Dilemma" | 2010 | Little Rabbits: Wagamama Twin Tail (Special Limited Edition DVD) |
| "Extract (The Truth in Me)" | 2010 | Extract: I've Girls Compilation Vol. 7 |
| "Initiative" | 2010 | Love, Elections & Chocolate (Special Limited Edition DVD) |
| "Thankful (Kiseki no Ashita e)" (奇跡の明日へ; "To the Miracle Tomorrow") | 2011 | Nanatsu no Fushigi no Owaru Toki (Special Limited Edition DVD) |
| "Timeless Time" | 2011 | Nanatsu no Fushigi no Owaru Toki (Special Limited Edition DVD) |
| "Blaze a Trail" | 2012 | G.C. Best: I've Girls Compilation |
| "Morning Glory (Eikō no Asa)" (栄光の朝; "Morning of Glory") (Note: Released as a part of the game Natsuiro Asagao Residence. Not released to CD.) | 2012 | |
| "Ashiato (A Happiness Maker)" (あしあと; "Footprints") | 2012 | Hatsukoi 1/1 (first press bonus soundtrack) |
| "Kōbō" (光芒; "Beam of Light") | 2012 | Shakugan no Shana F Superiority Shanaiii Vol. 3 |
| "Wings of Courage (Sora o Koete)" (空を超えて; "Crossing the Sky") | 2014 | Aokana - Four Rhythms Across the Blue (Vocal & Sound Collection) |

== Video albums ==
List of media, with selected chart positions
| Title | Album details | Peak positions |
| Title | Album details | JPN DVD |
|---|---|---|
| I've in Budokan 2005: Open the Birth Gate | I've Sound concert featuring a performance set by Mami Kawada; Released: June 23, 2006 (JPN); Label: Broccoli; Formats: DVD | 229 |
| Mami Kawada First Live Tour 2006 "Seed" Live & Life Vol. 1 | Released: April 4, 2007 (JPN); Label: Geneon; Formats: DVD | 114 |
| Mami Kawada Live Tour 2008 "Savia" Live & Life Vol. 2 | Released: December 24, 2008 (JPN); Label: Geneon; Formats: DVD | — |
| I've in Budokan 2009: Departed to the Future | I've Sound concert featuring a performance set by Mami Kawada and Healing Leaf; Released: August 26, 2009 (JPN); Label: VisualArt's; Formats: DVD | 53 |
