= Mami Kawada Best: Birth =

Mami Kawada BEST ~BIRTH~

Compilation album by Mami Kawada
- Released: February 13, 2013
- Genre: J-pop
- Label: Geneon
- Producer: I've Sound

Mami Kawada chronology
Square The Circle (2012)	Mami Kawada BEST ~BIRTH~ (2013)	Parablepsia (2015)

Mami Kawada Best Birth (styled as MAMI KAWADA BEST ~BIRTH~) is a compilation album by J-pop singer Mami Kawada. It was released on February 13, 2013 under Geneon Universal Entertainment. This album tentatively contains sixteen tracks which include her singles "Masterpiece" and her newly released song "Borderland". This BEST album does not feature the opening theme for the OVA series Shakugan no Shana S entitled "Prophecy".

The album came in a limited Blu-ray edition (GNCV-1032) and a regular CD-only edition (GNCV-1033). The Blu-ray edition contains footage from Kawada’s 2012 Live Tour ~ Square the Circle ~ captured at Ebisu Liquid Room on September 17, 2012. The album peaked at number 15 on Oricon Albums Chart.

== Track listing ==
1. Radiance - 4:21
  - Lyrics by: Mami Kawada & Kotoko
  - Composition & Arrangement by: Tomoyuki Nakazawa
  - Performed by: Mami Kawada
2. Hishoku no Sora - 4:15
  - Lyrics: Mami Kawada
  - Composition/Arrangement by: Tomoyuki Nakazawa
  - Performed by: Mami Kawada
3. Akai Namida - 4:19
  - Lyrics: Mami Kawada
  - Composition: Tomoyuki Nakazawa
  - Arrangement: Tomoyuki Nakazawa
  - Performed by: Mami Kawada
4. Get My Way! - 2:56
  - Composition: Kazuya Takase
  - Arrangement by: Kazuya Takase, Takeshi Ozaki
  - Performed by: Mami Kawada
  - Lyrics: Mami Kawada
5. Joint - 4:01
  - Lyrics: Mami Kawada
  - Composition: Tomoyuki Nakazawa
  - Arrangement: Tomoyuki Nakazawa, Takeshi Ozaki
  - Performed by: Mami Kawada
6. PSI-Missing - 4:23
  - Lyrics: Mami Kawada
  - Composition: Tomoyuki Nakazawa
  - Arrangement by: Takeshi Ozaki
  - Performed by: Mami Kawada
7. Masterpiece - 4:37
  - Lyrics: Mami Kawada
  - Composition/Arrangement: Maiko Iuchi
  - Performed by: Mami Kawada
8. No Buts! - 3:37
  - Lyrics: Mami Kawada
  - Composition: Tomoyuki Nakazawa
  - Arrangement: Tomoyuki Nakazawa, Takeshi Ozaki
  - Performed by: Mami Kawad
9. See visionS - 5:26
  - Lyrics: Mami Kawada
  - Composition/Arrangement: Maiko Iuchi
  - Performed by: Mami Kawada
10. Serment - 4:17
  - Lyrics: Mami Kawada
  - Composition: Tomoyuki Nakazawa
  - Arrangement: Tomoyuki Nakazawa, Takeshi Ozaki
  - Performed by: Mami Kawada
11. Borderland - 3:43
  - Lyrics: Mami Kawada
  - Composition: Tomoyuki Nakazawa
  - Arrangement: Tomoyuki Nakazawa, Takeshi Ozaki and Kazuya Takase
  - Performed by: Mami Kawada
12. Fixed Star
  - Lyrics: Mami Kawada
  - Composition: Tomoyuki Nakazawa
  - Arrangement: Tomoyuki Nakazawa, Takeshi Ozaki
  - Performed by: Mami Kawada
13. Kaze to Kimi o Daite (2013 ver.)
  - Lyrics: TBA
  - Composition: TBA
  - Arrangement: TBA
  - Performed by: Mami Kawada
14. Eclipse
  - Lyrics: TBA
  - Composition: TBA
  - Arrangement: TBA
  - Performed by: Mami Kawada
15. Asu e no Namida
  - Lyrics: TBA
  - Composition: TBA
  - Arrangement: TBA
  - Performed by: Mami Kawada
16. Birth
  - Lyrics: TBA
  - Composition: TBA
  - Arrangement: TBA
  - Performed by: Mami Kawada
