= A Certain Magical Index (TV series) =

Japanese anime television series

- とある魔術の禁書目録(インデックス); Toaru Majustsu no Indekkusu
- Type: TV series
- Genre: Science fantasy Action
- Based on: A Certain Magical Index by Kazuma Kamachi
- Directed by: Hiroshi Nishikiori
- Series composition: Masanao Akahoshi (S1-2); Hiroyuki Yoshino (S3)
- Music by: I've Sound (S1-2); Maiko Iuchi
- Voices of: Atsushi Abe; Yuka Iguchi; Rina Satō; Kisho Taniyama; Shizuka Itō; Nobuhiko Okamoto; Satoshi Hino
- Opening themes: "PSI-Missing" by Mami Kawada (S1, eps 1-16); "Masterpiece" by Mami Kawada (S1, eps 17-24); "No Buts!" by Mami Kawada (S2); "See Visions" by Mami Kawada (S2, ep 17); "Gravitation" by Kurosaki (S3, Pt. 1); "Roar" by Kurosaki (S3, Pt. 2)
- Ending themes: "Rimless ~Rimless World~" by Iku (S1, eps 1-19); "Oath ~Just a Little Once More~" by Iku (S1, eps 20-24); "Magic∞World" by Kurosaki (S2, eps 1-13); "Memories Last" by Kurosaki (S2, eps 14-24); "Eve of a Revolution" by Yuka Iguchi (S3, Pt.1); "The Never-Ending Song" by Yuka Iguchi (S3, Pt. 2)
- No. of seasons: 3 (including OVA)
- No. of episodes: 72 (including 6 OVA episodes) (list of episodes)

Production
- Studio: J.C.Staff
- Producers: Kazuma Miki; Yasutaka Kimura; Nobuhiro Nakayama (S1-2); Satoshi Fujita (S1-2); Kentarou Hattori (S3); Kozue Kaneniwa (S3); Hiroshi Anami (S3); Yuuichirou Shiji (S3); Noritomo Isogai (S3); Michihisa Abe (S3)
- Production companies: Project-Index: Geneon Universal (Note: Credited as Geneon Entertainment for season 1); ASCII Media Works; Square Enix; J.C.Staff; AT-X; Kadokawa Mobile (S1)

Original release
- Networks: AT-X, CBC (S1-2), CTC (S1-2), MBS, Teletama (S1-2), Tokyo MX, tvk (S1-2), BS11 (S3)
- Release: October 4, 2008 – April 5, 2019

Related
- A Certain Magical Index: The Movie – The Miracle of Endymion

A Certain Magical Index (とある魔術の禁書目録(インデックス)) is a Japanese anime television series based on the light novel series of the same name by Kazuma Kamachi. Produced by J.C. Staff, the series aired from October 2008 to March 2009 and was followed up by two sequels A Certain Magical Index II, airing from October 2010 to April 2011 and A Certain Magical Index III airing from October 2018 to April 2019.

== Cast ==
Character	Japanese voice actor	English voice actor
Toma Kamijo	Atsushi Abe	Micah Solusod
Index Librorum	Yuka Iguchi	Monica Rial
Mikoto Misaka	Rina Satō	Brittney Karbowski
Stiyl Magnus	Kisho Taniyama	Robert McCollum
Kaori Kanzaki	Shizuka Itō	Morgan Garrett
Accelerator	Nobuhiko Okamoto	Austin Tindle
Shiage Hamazuma	Satoshi Hino	Clifford Chapin

== Production ==
A 24-episode anime adaptation of A Certain Magical Index was produced by J.C.Staff and directed by Hiroshi Nishikiori, which was aired in Japan from October 4, 2008, to March 19, 2009. The anime was collected into eight Blu-ray and DVD sets, which were released from January 23 to August 21, 2009.

A second season titled A Certain Magical Index II began airing in Japan from October 8, 2010, to April 1, 2011 and was also streamed on Nico Nico Douga. The second season's eight volumes of Blu-ray and DVD sets were released from January 26 to September 22, 2011.

An animated film titled A Certain Magical Index: The Movie – The Miracle of Endymion (劇場版 とある魔術の禁書目録 エンデュミオンの奇蹟, Gekijōban Toaru Majutsu no Indekkusu: Endyumion no Kiseki) was released in Japan on February 23, 2013. It is based on an original story written by Kamachi and features the main characters from both Index and Railgun anime series, along with the new ones designed by Haimura. The Blu-ray and DVD set of the film, which was released on August 28, is included with a bonus anime titled A Certain Magical Index-tan: The Movie – The Miracle of Endymion... Happened, or Maybe Not.

The 26-episode third season titled A Certain Magical Index III aired in Japan from October 5, 2018, to April 5, 2019. The third season's eight volumes of Blu-ray and DVD sets were released from December 26, 2018 to July 31, 2019, with episodes 6 and 7 of the bonus short anime parody titled A Certain Magical Index-tan, which depicted Index in her chibi form, included in the first and fifth limited edition releases. The third season was originally planned to be a reboot but it was later decided to be a sequel instead. The three seasons were released on Hulu in Japan on March 24, 2022.

In North America, Funimation (which now goes by the name of Crunchyroll LLC) has licensed the series for home video and streaming. An English language dub began streaming on their website in September 2012 and was released on DVD on December 11. The first season aired in North America on the Funimation Channel on January 21, 2013. It can also been seen on the Crunchyroll streaming service after the Funimation brand was unified with the former in 2022.

The series was released in Australia by a partnership between Universal Pictures Home Entertainment and Sony Pictures. Funimation has also licensed the film in North America and released it at theaters in the United States on January 12, 2015. Animatsu Entertainment released the series in the United Kingdom. In Southeast Asia, Muse Communication licensed the series and broadcast it through i-Fun Anime Channel and their YouTube channel.

=== Music ===
Maiko Iuchi of I've Sound is in charge of music for the series' three seasons. The first opening theme music, used in episodes 1–16 of the first season of A Certain Magical Index, is "PSI-Missing", while the second one, used in episode 17 onwards, is "Masterpiece", both performed by Mami Kawada. The first ending theme music, used in episodes 1–19, is "Rimless ~Rimless World~" (Rimless 〜フチナシノセカイ〜, Rimless ~Fuchinashi no Sekai~), while the second one, used in episode 20 onwards, is "Oath ~Just a Little Once More~" (誓い言 ～スコシだけもう一度～, Chikaigoto ~Sukoshi Dake Mō Ichido~), both performed by Iku.

The first opening theme music of A Certain Magical Index II is "No Buts!", while the second one, introduced in episode 17, is "See Visions", both performed by Kawada. The first ending theme music, used in episodes 1–13, is "Magic∞World", while the second one, used in episode 14 onwards, is "Memories Last" (メモリーズ・ラスト, Memorīzu Rasuto), both performed by Kurosaki.

The first opening theme music of A Certain Magical Index III is "Gravitation", while the second one is "Roar", both performed by Kurosaki. The first ending theme music is "Eve of a Revolution" (革命前夜, Kakumei Zenya), while the second one is "The Never-Ending Song" (終わらない歌, Owaranai Uta), both performed by Yuka Iguchi.

== Reception ==
Chris Beveridge from The Fandom Post praised the anime adaptation, calling it a "fun series" and "pretty engaging". Ian Wolf from Anime UK News also praised the series, specifically for the action, and stated the music was acceptable. Like Beveridge and Wolf, Carl Kimlinger from Anime News Network also offered praise to the series for the characters and action, while criticizing for being a bit generic at times. Like Kimlinger, Theron Martin from the same website also praised the action and characters, while criticizing it for feeling preachy at times. André Van Renssen from Active Anime called the series "a decent show", comparing it to Shakugan no Shana for its action. Despite that, they also criticized the series for being too violent at times.
