= Linkage =

Linkage may refer to:

- Linkage (album), by J-pop singer Mami Kawada, released in 2010
- Linkage (graph theory), the maximum min-degree of any of its subgraphs
- Linkage (horse), an American Thoroughbred racehorse
- Linkage (hierarchical clustering), The linkage criterion determines the distance between sets of observations as a function of the pairwise distances between observations
- Linkage (linguistics), a set of languages descended from a former dialect continuum
- Linkage (mechanical), assemblies of links designed to manage forces and movement
- Linkage (policy), a Cold War policy of the United States of America towards the Soviet Union and Communist China
- Linkage (software), a concept in computer programming
- Genetic linkage, the tendency of certain genes to be inherited together
- Glycosidic linkage, a type of covalent bond that joins a carbohydrate (sugar) molecule to another chemical group
- Flux linkage, the total flux passing through a surface formed by a closed conducting loop

== See also ==
- Hyperlink
