= Takayuki Kondo =

Japanese voice actor (born 1978)

- 近藤 孝行
- Born: June 5, 1978 (age 48); Tottori Prefecture, Japan
- Occupation: Voice actor
- Years active: 1997–present
- Height: 173 cm (5 ft 8 in)

Takayuki Kondo (近藤 孝行, Kondō Takayuki; born June 5, 1978) is a Japanese voice actor from Tottori Prefecture, Japan. He is affiliated with Aoni Production.

== Filmography ==
=== Anime ===
- A Destructive God Sits Next to Me – Homeroom Teacher
- Anohana: The Flower We Saw That Day – Tetsudō "Poppo" Hisakawa
- Aokana: Four Rhythm Across the Blue – Shion Aoyagi
- Aquarion Logos – Shintaro Hayashi
- Argevollen – Tsutomu Kutsuwada
- Atelier Rorona: The Alchemist of Arland – Tantoris
- Bakugan Battle Brawlers – Shinjiro Kuso, Rikimaru, Klaus Von Hertzon, Takashi, Preyas Angelo/Predator Angelo
- Bakugan Battle Brawlers: New Vestroia – Shinjiro Kuso, Klaus Von Hertzon
- Basquash! – Naviga Stelte
- Beelzebub - Killer Machine Abe
- Buso Renkin – Kouji Rokumasu
- Classroom Crisis – Sakugo Maioka
- Eien no 831 – Older Sakata Twin
- Genshiken Nidaime – Souichirou Tanaka
- Godannar – Go Saruwatari
- Golden Time – Hoshhi
- Hitorijime My Hero – Hōjō
- Hyōka – Jun'ya Nakajō
- Kyouran Kazoku Nikki – Ouka Midarezaki
- Medarot – as Kantaroth
- My Senpai Is Annoying – Hijikata
- One Piece - Fuga
- Otome Yōkai Zakuro – Takatoshi Hanadate
- Oscar's Oasis – Buck
- Pandora Hearts – Fang
- Paradox Live the Animation – Iori Suiseki
- Rockman EXE Stream - ShineMan, Bōsōzoku (B), Nenjiro, Observer (A)
- Shakugan no Shana – Eita Tanaka
- Shakugan no Shana Second – Eita Tanaka
- Shakugan no Shana III Final – Eita Tanaka
- Shokugeki no Soma - Donato Gotōda, Julio Shiratsu
- Starship Operators - Hide Chiba
- The Family Circumstances of the Irregular Witch – Fennel
- The Legend of Heroes: Trails of Cold Steel – Northern War – Logan Mugart, Wallace Bardias
- The Prince of Tennis – Shuichiro Oishi
- The Prince of Tennis II: U-17 World Cup – Kiko Balentien
- The Vampire Dies in No Time – Kameya
- The World is Still Beautiful – Kitora
- Tokyo Ghoul – Take Hirako
- Transformer CarRobot – Mach Alert/Super Mach Alert, Dangar
- Tsurune: The Linking Shot – Kōshirō Fuwa
- Umineko: When They Cry – Ootsuki
- Upotte!! – Genkoku
- Utawarerumono – Suwonkas
- Yu-Gi-Oh! Duel Monsters – Hiroto Honda (Tristan Taylor (Episodes 1-51))
- Yu-Gi-Oh! The Dark Side of Dimensions – Hiroto Honda

=== Advertisement ===
- Trailers for the Ace Attorney series – Ryuichi Naruhodo

=== Tokusatsu ===
- Juken Sentai Gekiranger – Confrontation Beast-Porcupine Fist Mārashiya (Episode 23)
- Engine Sentai Go-onger – Savage Water Barbaric Machine Beast Pipe Banki (Episode 2)

=== Drama CDs ===
- Samejima-kun to Sasahara-kun – Manager
- Taiyō no Ie – Mr. Nakamura
- Paradox Live – Iori Suiseki

=== Video games ===
- Aokana: Four Rhythm Across the Blue - Shion Aoyagi
- Bomberman Jetters – Sharkun
- Phoenix Wright: Ace Attorney − Spirit of Justice – Ryuichi Naruhodo
- Pokémon Go – Tropius
- Project X Zone 2 – Ryuichi Naruhodo
- Re:Birthday Song Shinigami Kareshi – Syun
- The Legend of Heroes: Trails in the Sky - Agate Crosner
- Trauma Center: Second Opinion – Kousuke Tsukimori (Derek Stiles)
- Teppen - Ryuichi Naruhodo
- Jack Jeanne - Sarafumi Takashina
