= Square the Circle (Mami Kawada album) =

Studio album by Mami Kawada
- Released: August 8, 2012
- Label: Geneon Entertainment
- Producer: I've Sound

Mami Kawada chronology
Linkage (2010)	Square the Circle (2012)	Mami Kawada BEST ~BIRTH~ (2013)

Square the Circle (stylized as SQUARE THE CIRCLE) is an unreleased album by J-pop singer Mami Kawada. It was released on August 8, 2012, by Geneon Universal Entertainment. The album includes thirteen tracks which includes her singles "No Buts!", "See Visions" and "Serment".

The album came in a limited CD+Blu-ray edition (GNCV-1030) and a regular CD-only edition (GNCV-1031). The limited edition also includes the music videos of "Hishoku no Sora", "Seed" and "Portamento".

The album has been a commercial success, reaching the peak position of #22 on the Oricon Albums Chart.

== Track listing ==
1. SQUARE THE CIRCLE—5:25
  Composition/Arrangement: Takase Kazuya
2. No Buts!—3:37
  Composition: Nakazawa Tomoyuki
  Arrangement: Nakazawa Tomoyuki, Ozaki Takeshi
3. my buddy—4:30
  Composition: Nakazawa Tomoyuki
  Arrangement: Nakazawa Tomoyuki, Ozaki Takeshi
4. Don't stop me now!—4:07
  Composition/Arrangement: Iuchi Maiko
5. Clap!Clap!Clap!—4:31
  Composition: Ozaki Takeshi
  Arrangement: Nakazawa Tomoyuki, Ozaki Takeshi
6. Usual...—3:38
  Composition/Arrangement: Kawada Mami, Nakazawa Tomoyuki, Ozaki Takeshi
7. See visionS—5:24
  Composition/Arrangement: Iuchi Maiko
8. live a lie—6:21
  Composition/Arrangement: C.G mix
9. Midnight trip // memories of childhood—4:11
  Composition/Arrangement: Takase Kazuya
10. Rasen Kaidan (らせん階段, Spiral staircase)—4:47
  Composition/Arrangement: Iuchi Maiko
11. F—5:50
  Composition/Arrangement: NakaZaki Mai (Nakazawa + Ozaki + Maiko)
12. Going back to square one—3:50
  Composition: Ozaki Takeshi
  Arrangement: Nakazawa Tomoyuki, Ozaki Takeshi
13. Serment—4:10
  Composition: Nakazawa Tomoyuki
  Arrangement: Nakazawa Tomoyuki, Ozaki Takeshi
