= Joint (song) =

Single by Mami Kawada

from the album Savia
- B-side: "Triangle"
- Released: October 31, 2007
- Genre: J-pop
- Length: 17:40
- Label: Geneon
- Songwriter: Mami Kawada
- Producer: I've Sound

Mami Kawada singles chronology
"Get My Way!" (2007)	"Joint" (2007)	"PSI-Missing" (2008)

"Joint", stylized as "JOINT", is the fifth maxi single by Japanese J-pop artist Mami Kawada, with both its A-side and B-side featured in her 2008 Savia album. It contains four tracks in both regular and instrumental versions and spans 17:40. Both its A-side and B-side tracks are featured as opening and ending themes for the second season of the anime series Shakugan no Shana. Geneon Entertainment released the single on October 31, 2007, in both a regular CD release and a limited CD and DVD that featured the music video for the track "Joint" bearing the catalog numbers GNCA-86 and GNCA-85 respectively.

== Context ==
Two years prior, Mami Kawada had written the single "Hishoku no Sora" (2005), her second most successful single, title track of which was featured as the opening theme to the first season of the anime adaptation of the light novel series Shakugan no Shana. In 2007, Kawada was pleased to be asked once more to write theme music for the upcoming second season of the anime adaptation entitled Shakugan no Shana II. Its story is focused around Yuji Sakai, an ordinary Japanese high school boy who inadvertently becomes involved in a perpetual war between forces of balance and imbalance in existence. In the process, he befriends the title character Shana, a female fighter for the balancing force, and one of his classmates named Kazumi Yoshida. During an interview, Kawada described Yuji as giving the impression of following behind Shana; however, during the second season, she described Yuji as giving off the same impression as Shana—the impression of walking together with Shana and actually providing her support during her battles.

Earlier in the year, Kawada had released her fourth single "Get My Way!" for the first season of the anime television series Hayate the Combat Butler. Up until her release of "Get My Way!", Kawada described herself as being bound by a set image of how she was meant to write and sing. After releasing her fourth single, she described having completely lost the image of how she would regularly sing. Before the release of her first two singles of the year 2007, "Akai Namida / Beehive" and "Get My Way!", she mentioned spending much time thinking, and during 2007, she began to slowly experimenting with different types of music. Thanks to this, she stated herself as being freed from image of how she was meant to perform. However, she noted it being ironic that despite the "Joint" being an experiment with this new style, she was returning for a third time to create music for Shakugan no Shana.

== Concept and creation ==
Mami Kawada choose the title "Joint" because that was the word that came strongly to her mind after completely reading the lyrics; it reflected how the protagonists of Shakugan no Shana II, Shana and Yuji, continually joined their power together to fight. After reading the script for Shakugan no Shana II, her first impression was that of the world about to fall into pieces. However, rereading the script, Kawada interpreted the work as an attempt to show that our world too is frail and could crumble at any moment as evidence by the many accidents that occur daily, which appear on the news. Thus, she try to convey the feeling everyone holding each other precious because of the miracle that everyone is alive today despite these accidents. In an effort to convey the mental state of both Yuji and Shana, Kawada tried write the lyrics to her two songs so as to "capture the world as seen through their eyes". However, she also stated that more than exclusively capturing the view points of the two protagonists, she tried to embody an image of the story as a whole but paralleling the story itself. Unlike in her previous work, "Hishoku no Sora", where she used words closely related to the series, in the lyrics for the tracks in "Joint", Kawada described wanting more emotion-inspiring lyrics. In response to comment that the expressions in her voice were very varied, Kawada stated that she simply sings with the music in the way that she most enjoys.

As a result of the love-triangle relationship between Yuji, Shana, and Kazumi in Shakugan no Shana II is still continuing, Kawada stated that her opinion of Kazumi has changed and the lyrics she wrote for the B-side "Triangle" is a testament to this. To Kawada, Kazumi changed from young girl who hid her feelings into someone more mature and strong who desired to openly declare her desire to fight for Yuji's love. She conveyed to the composer for "Triangle", Kazuya Takase, that she wanted the composition to be electronic music that combined the feelings of wanting comforting pain but also wanting to run free in resulting the trance-like feel of the song.

== Music video ==
The music video for "Joint" was directed by Ippei Morita, who has directed some of Mami Kawada's other music videos, and produced by I've Sound. It was released by Geneon Entertainment on a DVD in a limited edition of the single bearing the catalog number GNCA-85 bundled alongside the original CD containing the single's tracks.

== Reception ==
It peak ranked 9th on Oricon's Weekly Albums Chart and remained on the chart for nineteen weeks making it Mami Kawada's highest-ranking and longest-lasting single. The album's chart performance was recorded during its nineteen-week run on the Oricon chart.

== Track listing ==
1. "Joint" – 4:01
  Lyrics: Mami Kawada
  Composition: Tomoyuki Nakazawa
  Arrangement: Tomoyuki Nakazawa, Takeshi Ozaki
2. "Triangle" – 4:50
  Lyrics: Mami Kawada
  Composition & Arrangement by: Kazuya Takase
3. "Joint (Instrumental)" – 4:01
4. "Triangle (Instrumental)" – 4:48
