= Face of Fact =

"Baldr Force EXE Resolution OVA OP/ED single Face of Fact (Resolution Ver.)"

Single by Kotoko and Mami Kawada

from the album Seed
- B-side: "undelete"
- Released: March 1, 2006
- Genre: Single
- Length: 6
- Label: Geneon
- Songwriters: Kotoko, Mami Kawada
- Producer: I've Sound

This single contains the opening and ending themes for the Baldr Force EXE Resolution OVA. Face of Fact (Resolution Ver.) is the opening theme performed by Kotoko while Undelete is the ending theme which was performed by Mami Kawada.

== Track listing ==
1. Face of Fact (Resolution Ver.) (Kotoko) -- 5:01
  Lyrics: Kotoko
  Composition/Arrangement: C.G mix
2. Undelete (Mami Kawada) -- 5:19
  Lyrics: Mami Kawada
  Composition: Tomoyuki Nakazawa
  Arrangement: Tomoyuki Nakazawa, Maiko Iuchi
3. Face of Fact (Resolution Ver.) (instrumental) -- 5:01
4. Undelete (instrumental) -- 5:17

== Charts and sales ==
Oricon Ranking (Weekly)	Sales
21	14,694
