= Ray (musician) =

Japanese singer and radio personality

Ray 中山 怜香
- Also known as: Clione Reika; Reika Kisumi (木須実 怜花)
- Born: Reika Nakayama; October 14, 1990 (age 35); Hokkaido, Japan
- Genres: J-pop
- Occupations: Singer; radio personality
- Instrument: Vocals
- Years active: 2012–2017
- Labels: NBCUniversal Entertainment Japan (2012–2017); Warner Home Video (2012)
- Website: nbcuni-music.com/ray/

Reika Nakayama (中山 怜香, Nakayama Reika; born October 14, 1990), better known by her stage name Ray, is a Japanese singer and radio personality from Hokkaido. She signed to Geneon Universal Entertainment.

== Biography ==
Ray was born in Sapporo and raised in Otaru, Hokkaido. Ray originally worked as a gravure idol, performing at a singing audition event sponsored by Avex and Usen called a-motion2007, and releasing a DVD called Peach Collection and a second DVD called Pure Smile in 2008. She tried out for the All-Japan Anime Song Grand Prix in 2010. She also covered songs under the moniker Clione (クリオネちゃ).

She made her debut as a singer in 2012, performing the opening theme song "Sign" for the anime Waiting in the Summer. Her second single "Rakuen Project" (楽園PROJECT; "Paradise Project") was released on October 24, 2012, which is used as the opening theme to the 2012 anime television series To Love-Ru Darkness. Her third single "Recall" was released on February 6, 2013, which is used as the ending theme to the 2013 anime television series Amnesia.

On a blog post posted on January 25, 2017, Ray announced her retirement from singing to pursue other unspecified activities.

== Discography ==
=== Albums ===
List of albums, with selected chart positions
Title	Album information	Oricon
Title	Album information	Peak position
Rayve	Released: June 5, 2013; Label: Geneon Universal Entertainment; Format: CD (GNCA-1374)	25
Milky Ray	Released: June 4, 2014; Label: Geneon Universal Entertainment; Format: CD+DVD (GNCA-1406), CD (GNCA-1407)	28
Little Trip	Released: June 6, 2016; Label: Geneon Universal Entertainment; Format: CD+Blu-ray (GNCA-1484), CD (GNCA-1485)	14

=== Singles ===
Year	Song	Peak Oricon chart positions	Album	Theme song featured in
2012	"Sign"	11		Waiting in the Summer
2012	"Rakuen Project"	22		To Love-Ru Darkness
2013	"Recall"	30		Amnesia
2013	"lull ~Soshite Bokura wa~"	21		Nagi no Asukara
2014	"ebb and flow"	24		Nagi no Asukara
2015	"secret arms"	34		To Love-Ru Darkness 2nd
2015	"Hajimete Girls"	35		Wakaba Girl
2016	"a-gain"	23		Aokana: Four Rhythm Across the Blue
2016	"(heart)km/h"			Long Riders!

=== Other album appearances ===
Year	Song	Album	Notes	Ref.
2012	"Chigiri -Kono Hiroi Hiroi, Toki o Koete-" "Uwagoto -Shizumiyuku Watashi no-"	Yūkyū no Uta	Theme song collection for the PlayStation Portable visual novel Demons' Bond The Path of Exile	

== Appearances ==
=== Television ===
- Anime-TV (studio guest: December 29, 2011 and February 16, 2012)
- Anipara Ongakukan (live guest: March 30, 2012)

=== Radio ===
- A&G Artist Zone 2h (Tuesday host: January 3, 2012 – )
- A&G Chō Radio Show: Anisupa! (guest: January 28, 2012)
- Radio Rondo Robe (guest: February 3, 2012)
- Nonko to Nobita no Anime Scramble (guest: February 24, 2012)
- Kawada Mami no Attack Young (guest: November 14, 2012)
