= Savia (album) =

Studio album by Mami Kawada
- Released: March 26, 2008
- Recorded: 2007–2008
- Genre: J-pop
- Length: 59:05
- Label: Geneon
- Producer: I've Sound

Mami Kawada chronology
Seed (2006)	Savia (2008)	Linkage (2010)

Savia is an album by J-pop singer Mami Kawada. It is her 2nd studio album overall produced by I've Sound and Geneon Entertainment. The album was released on March 26, 2008.

This album's catalog number is GNCV-1001 for the Regular Edition (CD only) and GNCV-1002 for the Limited Edition (CD+DVD). The DVD will contain the PV for the song portamento.

The album has 13 songs and some of the songs came from her previous singles Akai Namida/Beehive, Get my way! and JOINT. There are 8 new songs plus an album remix of her song Beehive. 翡翠 -HISUI- was used as the theme song for the movie adaptation of the game Onechanbara, which marked her first non-anime tie-in. sense will be used as one of the insert songs for the anime series Shakugan no Shana II.

This album garnered the #15 position in the Oricon charts with a first-week sales of 9,504 units. This album charted for a total of 5 weeks.

== Track listing ==
1. energy flow - 2:09
  Composition: Tomoyuki Nakazawa
  Arrangement: Tomoyuki Nakazawa, Takeshi Ozaki
2. JOINT - 4:01
  Composition: Tomoyuki Nakazawa
  Arrangement: Tomoyuki Nakazawa, Takeshi Ozaki
  Lyrics: Mami Kawada
3. Beehive -album edit- - 4:28
  Composition: Tomoyuki Nakazawa
  Arrangement: Tomoyuki Nakazawa, Takeshi Ozaki
  Lyrics: Mami Kawada
4. TRILL - 4:50
  Composition/Arrangement: Kazuya Takase
  Lyrics: Mami Kawada
5. Akai Namida (赤い涙) - 4:19
  Composition/Arrangement: Tomoyuki Nakazawa
  Lyrics: Mami Kawada
6. triangle - 4:50
  Composition/Arrangement: Kazuya Takase
  Lyrics: Mami Kawada
7. sense - 4:13
  Composition: Tomoyuki Nakazawa
  Arrangement: Tomoyuki Nakazawa, Takeshi Ozaki
  Lyrics: Mami Kawada
8. DREAM - 5:35
  Composition/Arrangement: Maiko Iuchi
  Lyrics: Mami Kawada
9. intron tone - 4:22
  Composition: Tomoyuki Nakazawa
  Arrangement: Tomoyuki Nakazawa, Takeshi Ozaki, Kazuya Takase
  Lyrics: Mami Kawada
10. 翡翠 -HISUI- - 5:30
  Composition: C.G mix
  Arrangement: C.G mix, Takeshi Ozaki
  Lyrics: Mami Kawada
11. Saigo no Yakusoku (最後の約束) - 5:50
  Composition/Arrangement: Maiko Iuchi
  Lyrics: Mami Kawada
12. Get my way! - 2:56
  Composition: Kazuya Takase
  Arrangement: Kazuya Takase, Takeshi Ozaki
  Lyrics: Mami Kawada
13. portamento - 6:01
  Composition: Tomoyuki Nakazawa
  Arrangement: Tomoyuki Nakazawa, Takeshi Ozaki
  Lyrics: Mami Kawada

== Charts and sales ==
Oricon Ranking (Weekly)	Sales
15	14,867
