= Aokana - Four Rhythms Across the Blue =

2014 video game

- Original visual novel cover featuring heroines (from left to right): Misaki Tobisawa, Mashiro Arisaka, Asuka Kurashina and Rika Ichinose

蒼の彼方のフォーリズム (Ao no Kanata no Fō Rizumu)
- Genre: Drama, romance, science fiction
- Video game
- Developer: Sprite
- Publisher: Sprite
- Music by: Elements Garden
- Genre: Eroge, Visual novel
- Platform: Windows, PlayStation Vita, PlayStation 4, Nintendo Switch
- Released: Windows: JP: November 28, 2014; WW: September 27, 2019; PlayStation Vita: JP: February 25, 2016; PlayStation 4: JP: January 26, 2017; WW: TBA; Nintendo Switch: JP: March 29, 2018; WW: August 21, 2020
- Video game

Aokana - Four Rhythms Across the Blue: Eternal Sky
- Developer: Sprite
- Publisher: Sprite
- Platform: Android, iOS
- Released: October 5, 2016
- Video game

Aokana - Four Rhythms Across the Blue: Extra 1
- Developer: Sprite
- Publisher: Sprite
- Music by: Elements Garden
- Genre: Eroge, Visual novel
- Platform: Windows
- Released: June 30, 2017
- Video game

Aokana - Four Rhythms Across the Blue: Extra 2
- Developer: Sprite
- Publisher: Sprite
- Music by: Elements Garden
- Genre: Eroge, Visual novel
- Platform: Windows
- Released: May 27, 2022

Aokana - Four Rhythms Across the Blue, known in Japan as Ao no Kanata no Four Rhythm (蒼の彼方のフォーリズム, Ao no Kanata no Fō Rizumu; subtitled Beyond the sky, into the firmament), officially abbreviated as Aokana (あおかな) and translated as Four Rhythms Across the Blue, is a Japanese adult visual novel developed by Sprite and released for Windows on November 28, 2014. The game was ported to the PlayStation Vita, PlayStation 4, and Nintendo Switch. The plot follows high school student Masaya Hinata as he coaches fellow students Asuka Kurashina, Misaki Tobisawa, Mashiro Arisaka, and Shion Aoyagi in the sport of "flying circus", wherein competitors travel through the sky via shoes with anti-gravity properties. Depending on the route taken, Masaya can enter a romantic relationship with either Asuka, Misaki, Mashiro, or Rika Ichinose, a student from a rival school and his neighbor.

A manga adaptation began publication in Comp Ace magazine in October 2015. A spin-off mobile game was released in October 2016, followed by two fandiscs in 2017 and 2022 respectively. A sequel was announced for production but has since been put on hold. An anime television series adaptation, produced by Gonzo, directed by Fumitoshi Oizaki, and written by Reiko Yoshida aired between January and March 2016. Crunchyroll and Funimation co-released the anime television series on Blu-ray in North America in 2018.

== Gameplay ==
Aokana - Four Rhythms Across the Blue is a romance visual novel in which the player assumes the role of Masaya Hinata. Much of its gameplay is spent on reading the story's narrative and dialogue. The text in the game is accompanied by character sprites, which represent who Masaya is talking to, over background art. Throughout the game, the player encounters CG artwork at certain points in the story, which take the place of the background art and character sprites. The game follows a branching plot line with multiple endings, and depending on the decisions that the player makes during the game, the plot will progress in a specific direction.

There are four main plot lines that the player will have the chance to experience, one for each heroine. Throughout gameplay, the player is given multiple options to choose from, and text progression pauses at these points until a choice is made. Some decisions can lead the game to end prematurely, which offer an alternative ending to the plot. To view all plot lines in their entirety, the player will have to replay the game multiple times and choose different choices to further the plot to an alternate direction. Throughout gameplay, there are scenes with sexual CGs depicting Masaya and a given heroine having sex.

== Plot ==
In an alternate universe, shoes with anti-gravity properties are invented called Grav-Shoes, which allow people to fly freely. This leads to the development of a sport known as Flying Circus, where participants either race from one buoy to another or touch the opponent's back to score points. Masaya Hinata is a student at Kunahama Institute, which is located in a four-island archipelago south of Japan. In the past, he was active in the sport, but quit due to an overwhelming defeat. His life changes when a cheerful girl named Asuka Kurashina transfers to his school. There, Asuka becomes interested in Flying Circus, and despite being unfamiliar with the sport and a newcomer to the use of Grav-Shoes, she manages to score a point during a match with the Vice-Captain of a powerhouse school. This leads Asuka and Masaya, together with their classmate Misaki Tobisawa, first-year student Mashiro Arisaka and siblings Shion and Madoka Aoyagi to form a Flying Circus team.

== Characters ==
=== Main characters ===
Masaya Hinata (日向 晶也, Hinata Masaya)
Voiced by: Ryōta Ōsaka (Japanese); Adam Gibbs (English) (anime)
Masaya is player character in the visual novels and the supporting character in the anime. In his childhood, he was the prodigal protege of the world-famous Skywalker, Aoi Kagami; however, after suffering an especially brutal defeat, he retired from the sport and went on with his high school life wanting to have nothing to do with Flying Circus.

Asuka Kurashina (倉科 明日香, Kurashina Asuka)
Voiced by: Misato Fukuen (credited as Natsu Sawada in the PC game) (Japanese); Jill Harris (anime) (English)
A transfer student at Kunahama Institute, Asuka had never worn Grav-Shoes prior to moving to the island, but is able to pull off an air kick turn (a very difficult maneuver) her first time flying with them. Despite her ditziness she is also determined at times, training hard while having fun. She is the main protagonist of the anime. She briefly met Masaya during a previous trip to the island.

Misaki Tobisawa (鳶沢 みさき, Tobisawa Misaki)
Voiced by: Azumi Asakura (credited as Yuri Konno in the PC game) (Japanese); Anastasia Muñoz (anime) (English)
A second-year student at Kunahama Institute. Out of all the new Kunahama FC club members, she is the only one with previous experience in the sport. She and Mashiro are good friends. Has a fascination with cats and sometimes adds "nya" into her speech. Her favorite food is udon.

Mashiro Arisaka (有坂 真白, Arisaka Mashiro)
Voiced by: Nozomi Yamamoto (credited as Mito Sera in the PC game) (Japanese); Natalie Hoover (anime) (English)
A first-year student at Kunahama whose family owns a restaurant that serves udon. She is very overprotective of Misaki and joins the FC club to be with her.

Rika Ichinose (市ノ瀬 莉佳, Ichinose Rika)
Voiced by: Madoka Yonezawa (credited as Mako Mishiro in the PC game) (Japanese); Cristina Vee (anime) (English)
Masaya's neighbor and a first-year student at Takafuji Academy, a school with one of the top FC teams.

=== Other characters ===
Reiko Satōin (佐藤院 麗子, Satōin Reiko)
Voiced by: Ryōko Ono (PSV game) (credited as Rikka Kitami in the PC game), Risa Taneda (anime) (Japanese); Tia Ballard (anime) (English)
A second-year student at Takafuji and the Vice-Captain of the Takafuji FC club. She's proud and a bit self-centered, often making "grand entrances". Her family runs the Satou Food Group, a catering company famous for their high-quality seafood.

Saki Inui (乾 沙希, Inui Saki)
Voiced by: Natsumi Takamori (PSV game, anime) (credited as Yūka Kotorii in the PC game) (Japanese); Amanda Lee (anime) (English)
A second-year student at Kairyou Academy. She had previously participated in FC in England and is one of the fastest players in the world. Appears emotionless most of the time. She has been best friends with her mentor, Irina, since they were children.

Aoi Kagami (各務 葵, Kagami Aoi)
Voiced by: Megumi Ogata (Japanese); Rachel Robinson (anime) (English)
The physical and health education teacher at Kunahama Institute and a former national FC player. She serves as Masaya's mentor and the FC club's advisor.

Shion Aoyagi (青柳 紫苑, Aoyagi Shion)
Voiced by: Takayuki Kondo (PSV game, anime) (credited as Teppei Hirabayashi in the PC game) (Japanese); Christopher Wehkamp (anime) (English)
A third-year student at Kunahama Institute and the president of the Kunahama FC club. He is the last remaining member of the club before Masaya and others joined and tends to be overly dramatic in his actions.

Madoka Aoyagi (青柳 窓果, Aoyagi Madoka)
Voiced by: Naomi Wakabayashi (PSV game, anime) (credited as Miyako Suzuta in the PC game) (Japanese); Madeleine Morris (anime) (English)
Manager of the Kunahama FC club and classmate of Asuka, Masaya and Misaki. She is Shion's younger sister.

Minori Hosaka (保坂 実里, Hosaka Minori)
Voiced by: Yūko Gibu (PSV game, anime) (credited as Hozumi Momoi in the PC game) (Japanese); Felecia Angelle (anime) (English)
Mashiro's classmate and member of the newspaper club in Kunahama. She's very energetic and always carries around a microphone. She is also the commentator for the FC tournaments.

Hayato Shirase (白瀬 隼人, Shirase Hayato)
Voiced by: Takahiro Mizushima (PSV game, anime) (credited as Uta Kijima in the PC game) (Japanese); Oscar Contreras (anime) (English)
A worker at Sky Sports Shirase, a sporting goods store owned by his family that sells FC equipment.

Minamo Shirase (白瀬 みなも, Shirase Minamo)
Voiced by: Ai Shimizu (PSV game, anime) (credited as Yami Toyotaki in the PC game) (Japanese); Mikaela Krantz (anime) (English)
Hayato's younger sister. She helps out at the store and has a shy personality.

Botan Arisaka (有坂 牡丹, Arisaka Botan)
Voiced by: Hitomi Nabatame (PSV game, anime) (credited as Emi Yamato in the PC game) (Japanese); Marissa Lenti (anime) (English)
Mashiro's mother and owner of the family restaurant Mashiro Udon.

Kazunari Shindō (真藤 一成, Shindō Kazunari)
Voiced by: Kazuyuki Okitsu (PSV game, anime) (credited as Umesaki Charlie in the PC game) (Japanese); Shawn Gann (anime) (English)
Captain of the Takafuji FC club. He is a world-class FC player. He was inspired by Masaya to participate in FC hoping to beat him someday.

Irina Avalon (イリーナ・アヴァロン, Irīna Avaron)
Voiced by: Kaori Mizuhashi (PSV game, anime) (credited as Yūko Nōmi in the PC game) (Japanese); Alexis Tipton (anime) (English)
A second-year student at Kairyou Academy and Saki's coach. Originally from England, she is the daughter of a famous Grav-Shoe maker. She is obsessed in creating the "perfect and beautiful" FC based on Aoi's style.

Arika Okoze (虎魚 有梨華, Okoze Arika)
Voiced by: Ema Kogure (PSV game, anime) (credited as Hiori Hitsuki in the PC game) (Japanese); Alex Moore (anime) (English)
Flying style: Speeder
A first-year student at Shitou Suisan Academy. She is a close friend of Mashiro.

Mayu Ganeko (我如古 繭, Ganeko Mayu)
Voiced by: Nozomi Sasaki (PSV game, anime) (credited as Mima Yūki in the PC game) (Japanese); Amber Lee Connors (anime) (English)
A second-year student at Shitou Suisan Academy and Arika's senior and coach.

Kasumi Kurobuchi (黒渕 霞, Kurobuchi Kasumi)
Voiced by: Yuki Kaida (PSV game, anime) (credited as Kanami Fukashiro in the PC game) (Japanese); Colleen Clinkenbeard (anime) (English)
A second-year student at Dougaura High. A childhood friend of Rika, she was the one who introduced Rika to the world of Flying Circus.

== Development and release ==
Aokana - Four Rhythms Across the Blue is Sprite's second game after their debut title Love, Election and Chocolate. The game's producer was Akira Sakamoto. The project's planning was headed by Nachi Kio, who also contributed as the main scenario writer alongside Ryōichi Watanabe and Ryūsuke Mutsu. Artist Suzumori served as the art director and co-character designer with Itsuka Yūki. The background music was produced by members of Elements Garden. The game was released on November 28, 2014, as a limited-edition version, playable on a Windows PC. A PlayStation Vita version of the game was released on February 25, 2016, and a high-definition version for the PlayStation 4 was released on January 26, 2017. A Nintendo Switch version of the game was released in late 2017.

A smartphone game titled Aokana - Four Rhythms Across the Blue: Eternal Sky was released on October 5, 2016, and a sequel titled Aokana - Four Rhythms Across the Blue: Zwei was announced at the AnimeJapan event in March 2016. Due to Sprite going on hiatus following in 2018, development of Zwei was indefinitely put on hold.

The game was announced for an English release by NekoNyan in 2019 on Steam. A Nintendo Switch version of the game was released on August 21, 2020, in North America and Europe. However, it has been delayed to an undetermined date for PlayStation 4 after its release was limited to digital-only due to changes related to seven scenes within the game and "significantly less interest" expected in a physical version as a result. Four scenes have been modified and three have been removed completely, while the Nintendo Switch release received no changes to content or choice between physical and digital versions.

=== Fandiscs ===
A fandisc titled Aokana - Four Rhythms Across the Blue: Extra 1 was released in Japan on June 30, 2017, and worldwide on June 11, 2020. Extra 1S, a Nintendo Switch port of Extra 1, is confirmed to be in production as of June 2022, containing multiple new event scenes.

Aokana - Four Rhythms Across the Blue: Extra 2, the second fandisc, was officially announced on June 16, 2020, and was released in Japan on May 27, 2022. An English release was announced on August 19, 2022.

A new game titled Aokana - Four Rhythms Across the Blue: If 01 - Minamo Shirase - was announced by Sprite in October 2021, and is currently in development by Filmic Novel, a brand of Sprite. It will feature Minamo Shirase as the main heroine.

== Adaptations ==
- Aokana - Four Rhythms Across the Blue
- Manga
- Written by: Sprite
- Illustrated by: Hideyu Tōgarashi
- Published by: Kadokawa Corporation
- Magazine: Comp Ace
- Original run: December 2015 – present
- Volumes: 1
- Anime television series
- Directed by: Fumitoshi Oizaki
- Written by: Reiko Yoshida
- Music by: Elements Garden
- Studio: Gonzo
- Licensed by: Crunchyroll
- Original network: TV Tokyo, TVA, TVO, AT-X
- English network: SEA: Animax Asia
- Original run: January 12, 2016 – March 29, 2016
- Episodes: 12

=== Manga ===
A manga adaptation illustrated by Hideyu Tōgarashi began serialization in Kadokawa Corporation's Comp Ace magazine with the December 2015 issue sold on October 26, 2015. The first tankōbon volume was released on January 26, 2016.

=== Anime ===
An anime television series adaptation, produced by Gonzo, directed by Fumitoshi Oizaki, and written by Reiko Yoshida aired on TV Tokyo between January 12 and March 29, 2016. Crunchyroll streamed the series, which arranged Funimation to release it on home video with an English dub on September 11, 2018. Although there are romantic plot lines with Masaya and each of the four heroines in the visual novel, this is averted in the anime adaptation, and the view-point character is Asuka instead of Masaya.

| No. | Title | Original release date |
|---|---|---|
| 1 | "I'm Flying! I'm Actually Flying!" "Tondemasu, Tondemasu yo!" (Japanese: 飛んでます、飛んでますよっ!) | January 12, 2016 |
Transfer student Asuka Kurashina has just moved to the 4-Island-Archipelago, a zone where people can use a special type of shoes, Grav-Shoes, to fly. On her way to school, Asuka meets students Misaki Tobisawa and Masaya Hinata, who help her get to school on time. Once at school, Masaya and Misaki are asked to teach Asuka the basics of flying. As they fly to school next day, they see a dejected Shion Aoyagi, the president of school Flying Circus club, crouching on his knees after being defeated by Reiko Satouin, the vice-captain of the Takafuji's Flying Circus team. Asuka decides to take on Reiko herself despite the difference in their abilities. As Asuka is a beginner, Reiko decides that Asuka only needs to score once to win. At first, Asuka is completely dominated and unable to score even one point, but in the last moment she pulls off an air kick turn, an especially difficult move, and scores one point, winning the match.
| 2 | "Udon...?" "U... do... n...?" (Japanese: う…ど…ん…?) | January 19, 2016 |
After Reiko leaves, Shion begs Asuka and the others to join the Kunahama's Flying Circus team. At school, Shion's younger sister Madoka congratulates Asuka on scoring against Reiko. Madoka then encourages all of them to join the team. Asuka agrees almost immediately, but Masaya refuses and Misaki says she needs to think about it. After school, Madoka brings Asuka to the clubroom which is actually an old rundown bus. There they meet Shion and, surprisingly, Misaki and Mashiro, who have decided to join as well. They begin training, with Misaki being the best due to her having more experience. Asuka can fly but is unable to steer, and Mashiro is slow and uncoordinated. Aoi watches them while trying to encourage Masaya to join the team as well. Masaya, however, leaves without a word. The next day Madoka brings the girls to buy competition Grav-Shoes and flying suits. Afterwards, Misaki and Asuka have a practice match and Asuka's determination inspires Masaya to join the club as coach.
| 3 | "I Just Got a Little Fired Up" "Chotto Moetekita dake" (Japanese: ちょっと燃えてきただけ) | January 26, 2016 |
To boost the new recruits' skills, Aoi calls the Takafuji Flying Circus Team to arrange a training camp during spring break. During the last day of the camp, Reiko arranges some practice matches. Asuka is up against Rika Ichinose, a first-year and Speeder at Takafuji and she manages to score a point with an Air Kick Turn, surprising everyone, but ultimately loses the match. Mashiro plays Reiko but is completely defeated. Kazunari and Misaki are the last match and Kazunari immediately scores off the first buoy. Misaki, unable to keep up, takes a shortcut. He then purposely plays to her strength and proposes to take him on in a dogfight. Angered, Misaki chases after him and wants to attack but Masaya tells her to ignore the provocation and just stick to him like glue. Misaki follows and manages to score a point when they turn the corner. However, Kazunari still wins the match.
| 4 | "Meat Makes Me Happy!" "Oniku......Ureshii!" (Japanese: お肉......うれしい!) | February 2, 2016 |
Mashiro has been kept busy by make-up exams recently, causing her to often be late to FC training. Meanwhile, Misaki and Asuka are improving at a fast rate, leaving Mashiro lagging behind. After bumping into Rika by chance, Mashiro asks her to teach her the basics. Training starts the next day, and slowly Mashiro begins to pick up, and finds that she is more suited to be a Speeder like Rika than a Fighter like Misaki. As thanks, Mashiro gives Rika one of her stuffed cat toys and the two become friends. During a practice match with Asuka the next day, Mashiro manages to beat her. Misaki is pleased to see that Mashiro has finally found her own style of play instead of just blindly following her. In her way home, Asuka accidentally lets her phone slip out of her grasp and fall down a cliff, but then a white-haired girl swoops down from the sky at incredible speed and catches the phone for her before flying away.
| 5 | "Yeah, Keep Calm and Carry On" "Un, Ochitsuite Ikō" (Japanese: うん、落ち着いていこう) | February 9, 2016 |
The Summer Tournament has started, and Asuka is up against a girl named Arika Okoze from Shitou Suisan Academy. Misaki is up against Rika and Mashiro against Reiko. There, Asuka also spots the white-haired girl, Inui Saki from Kairyou Academy, who is playing against Shion. First up is Mashiro's match against Reiko. Mashiro uses a Low Yo-Yo and touches the first two buoys. However, Reiko engages her in dogfighting and wins 7-2. Next is Misaki and Rika, and Misaki wins 5-1. Shion takes on Saki with all his determination but loses 22-1. Asuka's match with Arika begins and the latter gains the advantage with a Low Yo-Yo and extremely wide Scissors, but Asuka turns the game around with an Air Kick Turn and dogfighting, winning 4-3.
| 6 | "Is That All You've Got?" "Sore ga Kimi no Jitsuryoku Kai?" (Japanese: それが君の実力かい?) | February 16, 2016 |
The second day of the Tournament has begun, and Asuka is up against Kasumi Kurobuchi from Dougaura High. Asuka wins 6-8 with an angry Kasumi wondering how Asuka can smile so happily during a serious match. Misaki is up against Kazunari next, with the latter taking the lead and avoiding the dogfight that Misaki is looking for. Following Masaya's instructions, Misaki manages to tackle Kazunari and engages him in a dogfight, scoring her first point, however Kazunari still wins 5-3. Asuka is now up against Kazunari and he scores the first point. He then scores another by using Cobra, a move mostly used by the pros. Asuka is very tired, but takes a shortcut and catches up to Kazunari. Kazunari pulls back to use Cobra again, but Asuka uses a succession of Air Kick Turns and scores four points. Kazunari gets extremely fired up and wraps up the match with another two points, winning 6-4.
| 7 | "Sting Before You're Stung!" "Sasareru Mae ni Sase!" (Japanese: 刺される前に刺せ!) | February 23, 2016 |
The second day of the Summer Tournament begins and Saki has won against Ganeko Mayu from Shitou Suisan. Only Kazunari and Saki are left for the final. During the ten-minute break, Irina approaches Aoi and explains to her that their style of FC was inspired by her, requesting that she watch the next match. Kazunari is confident but Saki slowly starts to dominate the match. Down on the sand, while everyone is shocked at the King of Kings losing, Asuka is entranced by Saki's perfectly planned moves, which unnerves Misaki greatly. Meanwhile, Saki overtakes Kazunari in the end and wins 8-6. Afterwards Madoka takes over as the new captain of the club in her brother's place. The next day, Misaki bumps into Kazunari at the bus stop. She questions him about his defeat, thinking that he would be furious and embarrassed but taking it surprisingly well instead. Kazunari explains that fear of losing means you're enjoying the sport. Shocked by his words, Misaki sits at the bus stop, deep in thought.
| 8 | "I... Can't Fly Anymore" "Mō... Tobenai" (Japanese: もう...飛べない) | March 1, 2016 |
Misaki has quit the FC team, much to the shock of the other members. Determined to work out an explanation from her, the girls try to talk to her, but Misaki is able to successfully escape their grasp each time. The next day after school the FC team sees a helicopter flying towards Kunahama Institute. Inui Saki and Irina Avalon emerge from the helicopter and request a practice match against Saki which Asuka accepts. Despite Asuka's efforts, however, the match is one-sided in Saki's favor and Asuka ends up plunging into the water, and Misaki dives in to save her. After the match, Asuka is emotionally devastated and breaks down crying as Misaki and the team tries to comfort her.
| 9 | "The Answer is in the Sky!" "Kotae wa Sora ni Arun desu!" (Japanese: 答えは空にあるんです!) | March 8, 2016 |
Misaki and the others are worried about Asuka who hasn't gone to school that day. The next day, Misaki finds Asuka in the clock tower and asks her about her feelings after losing to Saki. After school, during FC training, Asuka finds herself unable to execute moves she normally would have performed with ease. One night Misaki finds a drenched Asuka standing outside her house with a blank look on her face. Misaki invites her in for dinner and to stay the night, with Mashiro tagging along. Misaki explains to Asuka what Kazunari told her, hoping it will encourage Asuka. The next day, Asuka abruptly challenges Misaki to a match after school. If Asuka wins, Misaki will have to rejoin the FC team. After school, the girls begin the match, with Asuka getting the first point. Misaki turns the tide with 2 points. Asuka scores her second point but Misaki scores again and wins. After the match, Misaki decides to rejoin the team, much to the celebration of the other members.
| 10 | "Is That For FC, Too?" "Sore mo FC no Tame desu ka?" (Japanese: それもFCのためですか?) | March 15, 2016 |
The girls are practising harder than ever for the tournament. Halfway during a break, Asuka tries using her Grav-Shoes with balancers switched off, but finds it too hard to keep control. Meanwhile, Saki is sparring with top players. Pleased with her performance, Irina tells Saki to train with her balancers off. The next day, Reiko and Rika shows up to help the girl with their training. As Reiko and Rika land on the dock, Asuka reveals she invited them to train together. After training, Misaki takes a detour and comes to the Shindou family house, where Kazunari is meditating in preparation for the upcoming Fall Tournament, and request Kazunari train with them. Masaya also decides to take part in the training and challenges Asuka to a dogfight, in which Asuka is taught Teacher Aoi's special moves while the others learn down on the ground too. Halfway, Aoi joins the training too.
| 11 | "I Refuse to Lose!" "Watashi Makenai!" (Japanese: わたし負けない!) | March 22, 2016 |
The Fall Tournament has begun and Mashiro is up against Rika. After a close match, Mashiro wins 7-6 but loses in her second match. In the semifinals, Misaki is up against Saki. The match begins and Saki starts for the buoy while Misaki takes a shortcut. Using a Sonic Boost Misaki manages to engage Saki in a dogfight and hits Saki up into the air. Saki comes after Misaki again but Misaki hits her once more and Saki is forced to dodge as they ascend. They race together and Misaki is forced to fly upside-down so that she will not be at a disadvantage in a dogfight. Saki raises her left hand and hits out at Misaki but the latter dodges and touches her back, scoring. Saki sends her to the water but Misaki keeps coming at her. Inspired by her determination, Saki decides to dogfight wholeheartedly and scores two points. Misaki uses an Air Kick Turn and scores a point of her own but the match ends there with Saki winning by one point.
| 12 | "Let's... Keep Flying!!" "Motto...Tobō!!" (Japanese: もっと…飛ぼう!!) | March 29, 2016 |
Asuka is facing off with Saki. Asuka uses three consecutive Sonic Boosts and a new technique called Pentagram Force to score the first two points. After scoring a point herself, Saki attacks Asuka but the latter evades all her attacks and scores her third point. Now 3-1, an angry Irina orders Saki to switch off her balancer, allowing her to tap into the full potential of her shoes. Saki levels up the score and the match ends 3-3. During the break before the extra time, Asuka decides to switch off her balancer. The match restarts and Asuka plunges into the water, unable to keep control, but soon emerges from the water and resumes the match, scoring two more points. Irina orders Saki to attack Asuka while the latter is still trying to get her shoes under control but Saki ignores her. Seeing her change of heart, Asuka encourages Saki to enjoy the moment as they resume the dogfight. Saki and Asuka score a point each, leaving the score 6-4. Asuka once again encourages Saki to enjoy the match and keep flying together, to which Saki replies with a smile and proceeds to even up the score 6-6. As the extra time is up, whoever scores the next point will win. Asuka and Saki circle around each other, leaving behind a swirling ball of their contrails that leaves the audience in awe. Asuka suddenly loses control and Saki reaches out to touch her back but Asuka musters her determination and performs a backflip to touch Saki's back and win the championship. After the match, Irina apologises for her behavior. Saki and Irina becomes friends with the Kunahama girls and Masaya regains his determination to fly.

== Music ==
Aokana: Four Rhythm Across the Blue has seven pieces of theme music: one opening theme, one insert song, and five ending themes. The opening theme is "Wings of Courage (Sora o Koete)" (Wings of Courage ～空を超えて～; "Wings of Courage (Beyond the Sky)") by Mami Kawada. The insert song is "Infinite Sky" by Kotoko. Each heroine has her own ending theme, starting with Asuka's theme "Sora Koi" (空恋; "Sky Love") by Misato Fukuen. Misaki's theme is "Sense of Life" by Azumi Asakura. Mashiro's theme is "Millions of You" by Nozomi Yamamoto. Rika's theme is "Night Flight" by Madoka Yonezawa. The main ending theme is "Sky is the Limit" by Kawada. In addition, an image song single titled "Rays of the Sun" by Kawada was released on December 28, 2014, at Comiket 87. The main opening theme for the HD versions of the game is "Crossing Way" by Kawada.

The anime's opening theme is "Contrail (Kiseki)" (Contrail～軌跡～; "Contrail (Track)") by Kawada and the ending theme is "A-gain" by Ray. The single for "Contrail (Kiseki)" was released on January 27, 2016, and the single for "A-gain" was released on February 17, 2016; The opening theme to Ao no Kanata no Four Rhythm: Eternal Sky is "Believe in the Sky" by Kawada. A vocal collection of music for the series, which includes "Believe in the Sky", was released on May 1, 2016.

== Reception ==
Thomas Knight of NookGaming praised the worldbuilding, and Hey Poor Players' Kenny McKee said that "If you like VNs, you’re going to like Aokana." However, Reuben Mount of TheSixthAxis and Lyle Carr of God is a Geek felt the lewd moments and pantyshots were a negative.

In the 2014 Moe Game Awards, Aokana - Four Rhythms Across the Blue placed first.
