= Nagi-Asu: A Lull in the Sea =

Japanese anime television series and its adaptations

- Promotional poster of the Nagi no Asukara anime featuring main characters (clockwise from top): Tsumugu Kihara, Kaname Isaki, Manaka Mukaido, Hikari Sakishima and Chisaki Hiradaira

凪のあすから (Nagi no Asukara)
- Genre: Coming-of-age, fantasy, romance
- Created by: Project-118
- Manga
- Written by: Project-118
- Illustrated by: Risō Maeda
- Published by: ASCII Media Works
- Magazine: Dengeki Daioh
- Original run: April 2013 – March 2016
- Volumes: 6
- Manga

Nagi no Asukara 4-koma Gekijō: Nagiyon
- Written by: Project-118
- Illustrated by: Anko Chatō
- Published by: ASCII Media Works
- Magazine: Dengeki Daioh g
- Original run: September 27, 2013 – 2014
- Volumes: 1
- Anime television series
- Directed by: Toshiya Shinohara
- Written by: Mari Okada; Akiko Waba; Hiroyuki Yoshino; Junji Nishimura; Michiko Yokote; Toshizo Nemeto
- Music by: Yoshiaki Dewa; Depapepe; Saigenji; Shunsuke Kawata; Zentaro Watanabe
- Studio: P.A. Works
- Licensed by: AUS: Siren Visual; NA: NIS America; SEA: Muse Communication; UK: MVM Films
- Original network: Animax, Tokyo MX, Sun TV, KBS, TV Aichi, FTB, BBT, ITC
- Original run: October 3, 2013 – April 3, 2014
- Episodes: 26
- icon

Nagi-Asu: A Lull in the Sea, known in Japan as Nagi no Asukara (Japanese: 凪のあすから; lit. 'From The Calm Tomorrow'), is a 2013 Japanese anime television series animated by P.A. Works. The series centers on a group of seven friends: Hikari Sakishima, Manaka Mukaido, Chisaki Hiradaira, and Kaname Isaki, children from the sea; and Tsumugu Kihara, Miuna Shiodome, and Sayu Hisanuma, their new friends from the surface. A manga adaptation by Risō Maeda began serialization in the June 2013 issue of ASCII Media Works' Dengeki Daioh magazine.

== Plot ==
For a long time, human civilization had lived on the ocean floor, developing a scale-like layer on their skins called Ena which allows them to live underwater. However, there were many humans who wanted to live above the surface and they moved to land creating a fundamental separation between the two. After Nami Junior High School closes down, four 14-year-old students from the sea village Shioshishio have to attend Mihama Junior High School on the surface. What follows is their struggles adjusting to a new environment and the relationships between the land and sea humans, while dealing with their own newfound feelings that have just started appearing with the end of their childhood.

== Characters ==
=== Main characters ===
Hikari Sakishima (先島 光, Sakishima Hikari)
Voiced by: Natsuki Hanae (Japanese); Max Mittelman (English)
One of four childhood friends from Shioshishio. He has a short temper and usually scolds Manaka for her mistakes. Despite this, he has deep feelings for her, yet believes she is in love with Tsumugu. He is the son of Shioshishio's Chief Priest who serves the Sea God. By tradition, this makes him the future Chief Priest. At first, he hates all people from the surface, but after learning about the relationships between the land and sea humans (through Akari and Itaru), he gradually understands that there is no difference between the people from the surface and the sea. He goes into hibernation shortly after saving Akari during the Ofunehiki festival. After the 5-year time skip, Hikari reappears during a Tomoebi without any signs of aging, making him the first person to do so. He rejoins Mihama Junior High School as Miuna and Sayu's classmate and lives in the Shiodome home with his sister. In the last scene, Manaka and Hikari acknowledge each other's feelings and start a relationship, looking towards the future together.
Manaka Mukaido (向井戸 まなか, Mukaido Manaka)
Voiced by: Kana Hanazawa (Japanese); Michelle Ruff (English)
One of the students from Shioshishio. She is an indecisive junior high schooler who is prone to crying and is highly dependent on Hikari and Chisaki. At first, Manaka appears to have feelings for Tsumugu despite the taboo nature of dating someone from the surface, which Hikari gradually accepts. As time passes, she starts to become more independent. After saving Akari during the Ofunehiki festival and falling into the sea, she enters hibernation and takes on the role of the sacrificial maiden for the Sea God. After the time skip, she is found in the middle of the graveyard of Wooden Maidens near Shioshishio and brought to the surface while losing her Ena. She wakes up one week later and ends up staying with the Shiodome family. She has also lost the ability to fall in love and the associated parts of her memory as a result of leaving her post as the sacrificial maiden. Later, it is revealed that she has been in love with Hikari all along but decided to keep it a secret as she knew about Chisaki's feelings for him. In the last scene, Manaka and Hikari acknowledge each other's feelings and start a relationship, looking towards the future together.
Chisaki Hiradaira (比良平 ちさき, Hiradaira Chisaki)
Voiced by: Ai Kayano (Japanese); Brianna Knickerbocker (English)
One of the students from Shioshishio. She has feelings for Hikari but is afraid to admit it after realizing he is in love with Manaka. Because of this, she hides her true feelings as she believes that revealing her love for Hikari will affect their relationship. Chisaki is the only person among her Shioshishio friends who avoids hibernation after the Ofunehiki festival. Since the Ofunehiki festival, she has been staying with the Kihara family while studying in a nursing school. When she reunites with her Shioshishio friends, she feels left out as she is now much older than them. Chisaki fears change and feels guilty for having lived a relatively happy life during the time skip despite the absence of her friends. She has been clinging to her old feelings for Hikari as a means of claiming she has not changed over the past five years, but has actually fallen in love with Tsumugu. By the end of the story, Chisaki and Tsumugu become a couple, and she continues to live in the Kihara residence with a now-healthy Isamu, while Tsumugu is away for college.
Kaname Isaki (伊佐木 要, Isaki Kaname)
Voiced by: Ryōta Ōsaka (Japanese); Bryce Papenbrook (English)
One of four childhood friends from Shioshishio. He is quiet and mature for his age. While being the most mature among his friends, Kaname has always felt left out, not feeling that he is as loved by others the way his friends are. He has long held feelings for Chisaki and cares deeply for her. During the Ofunehiki festival, he goes into hibernation after falling off the boat while helping Chisaki save Tsumugu. After the time skip, similar to Hikari, Kaname wakes up without having aged and begins staying at the Kihara family's home. He realizes that when Chisaki's feelings for Hikari are unrequited, it is Tsumugu who she will turn to, not him. After Sayu tells him that she was waiting specifically for him, Kaname decides to start a relationship with her.
Tsumugu Kihara (木原 紡, Kihara Tsumugu)
Voiced by: Kaito Ishikawa (Japanese); Chris Hackney (English)
A boy from the surface whose grandfather is a fisherman. One day, he meets Manaka when she is caught in his net. He is quiet, stoic, and very interested in the underwater world. Tsugumu's grandfather was from the sea, while he has a complicated relationship with his mother. After the time skip, he attends college and majors in oceanography. He lives in the city and conducts research about the sea villages at his university. He becomes close to Chisaki and eventually falls in love with her. After accidentally declaring his love for Chisaki, he follows her into the sea and gains Ena. It is later revealed that he had known of Manaka's feelings for Hikari since the eve of the Ofunehiki five years previously, but agreed to keep it a secret at Manaka's request. After having a talk with Kaname about Chisaki's true feelings, Chisaki finally accepts her love for Tsumugu and they become a couple. He is last seen walking to the train station with Chisaki as he leaves for college.
Miuna Shiodome (潮留 美海, Shiodome Miuna)
Voiced by: Mikako Komatsu (Japanese); Xanthe Huynh (English)
A third grade elementary school girl who is Itaru's daughter. Miuna met Akari when she visited them shortly after she was born. She loves Akari but the thought of losing her like she did her mother caused her to refuse to accept Akari as family. Later on, she overcomes her fear and fully accepts Akari as her new mother. She also develops a crush on Hikari after he helps her accept familial love, despite the fact that he becomes her step-uncle upon Akari's marriage. During the five-year period of the time skip, Miuna could usually be found staring out at the ocean waiting for Hikari to return. After the time skip, she enters junior high school with Sayu. Her feelings for Hikari have only grown stronger, even to the point of rejecting one of her other classmates who has liked her since elementary school. When Miuna falls into the sea by accident, she develops Ena on her skin which allows her to breathe underwater like her mother. In episode 25, she becomes the new Lady Ojoshi but is later saved by Hikari. In the epilogue, she comes in terms with her unrequited feelings for Hikari, looking forward to the future where she believes new feelings will be born.
Sayu Hisanuma (久沼 さゆ, Hisanuma Sayu)
Voiced by: Kaori Ishihara (Japanese); Sarah Anne Williams (English)
A third grade elementary school girl with light brown pigtails and hazel eyes. She is Miuna's longtime best friend after she befriended her in spite of childhood bullying. After Kaname gets her to open up about her past and befriend Hikari, she develops feelings for Kaname. After the time skip, she enters junior high school with Miuna and decides to study hard to become an independent woman, but her crush on Kaname also grows stronger and she tries her best to overcome it. She eventually makes Kaname see her as not a little kid but as a girl his age, and they start a relationship.

=== Shioshishio residents ===
Tomoru Sakishima (先島 灯, Sakishima Tomoru)
Voiced by: Masuo Amada (Japanese); Richard Epcar (English)
The widowed father of Hikari and Akari. He is also the Chief Priest of Shioshishio, who performs religious duties. He cares for his children and wants them to make their own decisions. In episode 26, he wakes up from hibernation and meets his grandson, Akira.
Lord Uroko (うろこ様, Uroko-sama)
Voiced by: Kousuke Toriumi (Japanese); Chris Niosi (English)
The Sea God's messenger and namely the scale from the Sea God's shoulder blade. He appears as a man in his twenties. However, he does not seem to age. He ensures everyone follows the laws of the village. He is perverted and enjoys drinking sake. Despite this perverted attitude, he shows sincere feelings of love to the original Lady Ojoshi.

=== Oshiooshi residents ===
==== Shiodome family ====
Akari Shiodome (潮留 あかり, Shiodome Akari)
Voiced by: Kaori Nazuka (Japanese), Erica Mendez (English)
Hikari's older sister who married Itaru, Miuna's father. She was a friend of Miori and grew to love their family. When Miori died, she wanted to be there to support them. After the timeskip, she has a 4 year old son named Akira.
Itaru Shiodome (潮留 至, Shiodome Itaru)
Voiced by: Junji Majima (Japanese), Grant George (English)
Miuna's father. His first wife, Miori was from the sea. After a few years of recovering from Miori's death, he slowly begins a relationship with Akari and eventually marries her. He eventually becomes the father of Akira.
Akira Shiodome (潮留 晃, Shiodome Akira)
Voiced by: Shizuka Ishigami (Japanese); Wendee Lee (English)
Akari and Itaru's son. He is Hikari's nephew who was born during the hibernation of Shioshishio. He is mischievous and only listens to his sister, Miuna. He falls "in love" with Manaka. In the epilogue, like his sister, he also develops Ena on his skin.
Miori Shiodome (潮留 みをり, Shiodome Miori)
Voiced by: Aya Endō
Miuna's deceased mother and Akari's close friend. She was from Shioshishio but moved to the surface to marry Itaru.

==== Tsumugu's junior high school classmates ====
Takeshi Egawa (江川 岳, Egawa Takeshi)
Voiced by: Kengo Kawanishi (Japanese); Kyle McCarley (English)
A classmate who helped them built the statue for Ofunehiki. After the time skip, he ends up getting a girl pregnant and decides to quit college and work at her father's company. He later helps with the last Ofunehiki.
Shun Sayama (狭山 旬, Sayama Shun)
Voiced by: Yoshitsugu Matsuoka (Japanese); Jamal Fahim (English)
A classmate who helped them build the statue for Ofunehiki. After the time skip, he is working as the young master of Saya Mart. He loves playing pachinko. He also helps with the last Ofunehiki.
Kaori Akiyoshi (秋吉 香, Akiyoshi Kaori)
Voiced by: Yurika Kubo (Japanese); Faye Mata (English)
One of the classmates who helped build the statue for Ofunehiki. She loves to grope Chisaki. Five years later, she returns to Oshiooshi to help with the last Ofunehiki.
Yū Seiki (清木 憂, Seiki Yū)
Voiced by: Ikumi Hayama (Japanese); Mela Lee (English)
One of the classmates who helped them build the statue for Ofunehiki. She seems to have an interest in Kaname. Five years later, she returns to Oshiooshi to help with the last Ofunehiki.

==== Others ====
Atsushi Minegishi (峰岸 淳, Minegishi Atsushi)
Voiced by: Ayumu Murase (Japanese); Michael Johnston (English)
Miuna's classmate who confessed to her and was rejected. However, in the last episode, it is hinted that he has not given up on his feelings for her.
Isamu Kihara (木原 勇, Kihara Isamu)
Voiced by: Motomu Kiyokawa (Japanese); Steve Mann (English)
A former resident of Shioshishio and Tsumugu's grandfather who is also a fisherman. He accepts Chisaki into his household after the disaster that occurred during the Ofunehiki. After the time skip, he is shown recuperating in a hospital after his health deteriorated and is released from the hospital on the day of the Ofunehiki.
Satoru Mihashi (三橋 悟, Mihashi Satoru)
Voiced by: Shinji Kawada (Japanese); Matthew Mercer (English)
Tsumugu's research professor in university. He is very curious and passionate about the sea and the hibernation. Eventually, due to safety reasons, the university urged him to return as Saltflake (ぬくみ雪, nukumi-yuki) was falling more frequently.
Tsumugu's mother (紡の母, Tsumugu no Haha)
Voiced by: Akiko Kimura (Japanese); Wendee Lee (English)
Mother to Tsumugu. She lives in the city along with her husband. Tsumugu does not seem to be in a good relationship with his mother, as he tries to elude any opportunity for the two of them to speak. Tsumugu later states that she and her husband hate the sea and moved to the city, leaving behind Isamu. This may have been his reason for being hostile towards her. Despite Tsumugu running away, she doesn't seem to hold it against him that he decided to live with Isamu.
Lady Ojoshi (おじょし様, Ojoshi-sama)
Voiced by: Saori Hayami
A former sacrifice maiden to the Sea God. She once had a lover on the surface, however she developed feelings for the Sea God as well and never blamed him for anything. They also had two children together. Before the Sea God could realize this, he took her power to love someone and returned her to the surface. After Miuna is saved by Hikari, Lady Ojoshi's feelings were released into the sea, making the Sea God realize her true feelings. This, therefore, ended the Calm.

== Media ==
=== Manga ===
A manga adaptation, written by Project-118 and illustrated by Risō Maeda, began serialization in the June 2013 issue of ASCII Media Works' Dengeki Daioh magazine. The series has been collected in five tankōbon volumes as of September 2015. A second, four-panel comic strip manga titled Nagi no Asukara 4-koma Gekijō: Nagiyon (『凪のあすから』4コマ劇場 なぎよん), written by Project-118 and illustrated by Anko Chatō, began serialization on September 27, 2013, in ASCII Media Works' Dengeki Daioh g magazine. It has been collected in one tankōbon volume. Two anthology volumes were released in early 2014.

Nagi no Asukara by Risō Maeda

1. Volume 1, ISBN 978-4-04-891935-7 (September 27, 2013)
2. Volume 2, ISBN 978-4-04-866300-7 (February 27, 2014)
3. Volume 3, ISBN 978-4-04-866699-2 (July 25, 2014)
4. Volume 4, ISBN 978-4-04-869306-6 (February 27, 2015)
5. Volume 5, ISBN 978-4-04-865356-5 (September 26, 2015)
6. Volume 6, ISBN 978-4-04-865870-6 (April 26, 2016)

"Nagi no Asukara" 4-koma Gekijō: Nagiyon by Anko Chatō

- ISBN 978-4-04-866700-5 (July 25, 2014)

Anthologies

- Four-Panel Official Anthology: Nagi no Asukara (4コマ公式アンソロジー 凪のあすから, Yon-koma Kōshiki Ansorojii Nagi no Asukara), ISBN 978-4-04-866242-0 (January 27, 2014)
- Official Comic Anthology: Nagi no Asukara (公式コミックアンソロジー 凪のあすから, Kōshiki Komikku Ansorojii Nagi no Asukara), ISBN 978-4-04-866301-4 (February 27, 2014)

=== Anime ===
The anime series is produced by P.A. Works and directed by Toshiya Shinohara. The screenplay is written by Mari Okada and the original character designs are by Buriki. It started airing on October 3, 2013. For episodes 1 to 13, the opening theme is "lull ~Soshite Bokura wa~" (lull〜そして僕らは〜) by Ray and the ending theme is "Aqua Terrarium" (アクアテラリウム, Akua Terariumu) by Nagi Yanagi. For episode 14 to 25, the opening and ending themes are "Ebb and Flow" by Ray and "Mitsuba no Musubime" (三つ葉の結びめ) by Yanagi respectively. The 26th and final episode has 2 insert songs: "lull ~Earth color of a calm~" and "mnemonic", sung by Ray and Yanagi, respectively. An image song titled "Nagi" (凪) by Ray appears on her debut album Rayve. NIS America licensed the streaming and home video rights of the anime in North America. Siren Visual has licensed the series for Australia/New Zealand, and MVM Entertainment has licensed the series in the United Kingdom. NIS America released the complete series on a limited edition Blu-ray set with an artbook and two soundtrack CDs on June 30, 2015, which featured both Japanese and English audio tracks. Muse Communication licensed the series in Southeast Asia and streamed on Muse Asia YouTube channel.
