= Mami Kawada =

Japanese pop singer (born 1980)

- 川田 まみ
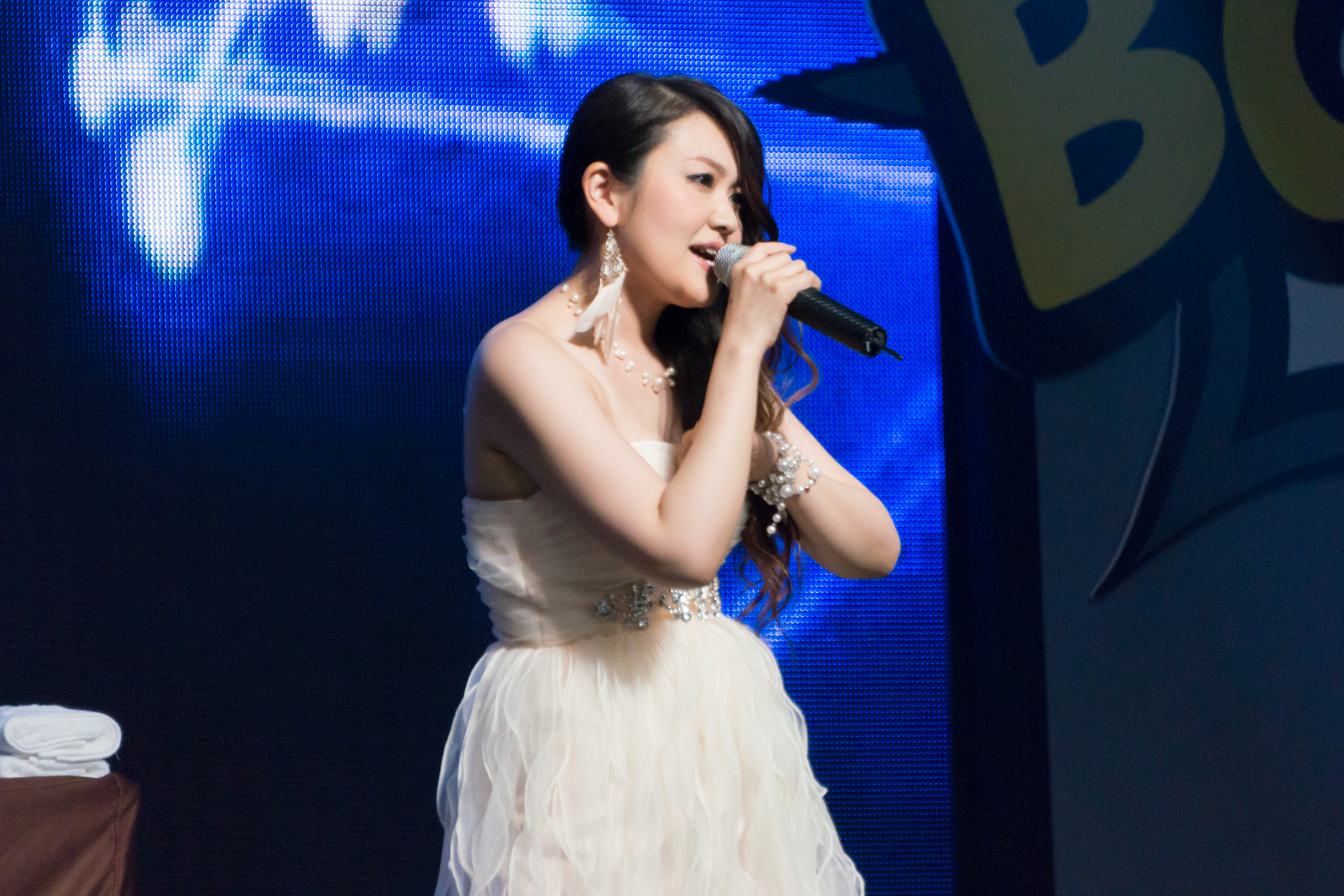
- Kawada at Bangkok Comic Con in 2014
- Born: February 13, 1980 (age 46); Sapporo, Japan
- Occupations: Singer, lyricist
- Years active: 2001–2016
- Spouse: Tomoyuki Nakazawa
- Musical career
- Genres: Electronic rock; trance
- Instrument: Vocals
- Labels: NBCUniversal Entertainment Japan (2005–2016); Warner Bros. Home Entertainment (2012)
- Website: mami-kawada.jp

Mami Kawada (川田 まみ, Kawada Mami; born February 13, 1980) is a Japanese retired pop singer and lyricist who was signed to NBCUniversal Entertainment Japan and also a member of I've Sound, a musical group which produces soundtracks for eroge (erotic games) and anime.

Born and raised in Sapporo, Japan, Kawada was discovered by her music teacher Eiko Shimamiya and joined the trance group I've Sound in 2001. She released her first single, a split-single with musician Kotoko, in 2002, and her first solo single in 2005. Her first album, Seed, was released the following year. She released four more albums throughout the remainder of her career.

Kawada's songs have been featured as theme music for various anime shows such as the Shakugan no Shana and A Certain Magical Index series. She has performed theme songs for various eroge such as Love, Election and Chocolate and Aokana: Four Rhythm Across the Blue. She has also written songs for other musicians. During the LisAni 2016 event, Kawada announced her retirement from singing activities following a final concert in May 2016.

== Biography ==
=== Debut ===
Kawada's vocal talents were first discovered by Eiko Shimamiya, who was her teacher at a vocal school in Sapporo, Hokkaido. She was introduced to I've Sound, a music production group which featured Shimamiya as a member. Kawada joined I've Sound in 2001, and in that year released her debut song titled "Kaze to Kimi o Daite" (風と君を抱いて; "Embrace You and the Wind"), which was used as the opening theme to the eroge Miss You. The song was later compiled on I've Sound's fifth compilation album Out Flow in 2003.

In 2002, she released her first song associated with an anime, "Sora no Mori de" (空の森で; "In the Forest of Sky"), the ending theme to the anime Please Teacher!. The song was released in a split single with singer Kotoko, who performed the series' opening theme "Shooting Star". That same year, Kawada and Shimamiya performed a number of theme songs for visual novels as the unit Healing Leaf, although only one of those songs, "Ame ni Utau Ballad" (雨に歌う譚詩曲; "A Ballad Sung in the Rain"), was featured in an I've Sound Compilation. In mid-2003, she performed the ending theme to the anime Please Twins!, "Asu e no Namida" (明日への涙; "Tears for Tomorrow"), which was also released in a split single with Kotoko.

=== 2005–06: Seed ===
In 2005, Kawada signed a contract with Geneon Entertainment (now NBCUniversal Entertainment Japan) and released her first major single "Radiance", which was used as the opening theme to the anime Starship Operators. Later that year, she released her second single "Hishoku no Sora", which was used as the opening theme to the anime series Shakugan no Shana. It became her best-selling single and sold approximately 37,000 copies, peaking at number 11 at the Oricon weekly charts.

In March 2006, Kawada and Kotoko released a split single for the OVA adaptation of the game Baldr Force, with Kawada performing the ending theme "Undelete" and Kotoko performing the opening theme "Face of Fact (Resolution ver.)". Four weeks later, Kawada released her debut album Seed. The album reached number 12 in the Oricon weekly charts and charted for five weeks, selling more than 25,000 copies. Later that year, Kawada held her first live tour, where she distributed a pamphlet CD containing the first instance of a song that she both performed and composed by herself, "Carpe Diem".

=== 2007: Savia ===
After her success with "Hishoku no Sora", Kawada released the single "Akai Namida / Beehive" in 2007. The single includes the song "Akai Namida", which was used as an insert song in the Shakugan no Shana movie in May 2007. She also sang "Tenjō o Kakeru Monotachi" (天壌を翔る者たち; "Those Who Scale Heaven and Earth"), the movie's ending theme, together with Kotoko, Shimamiya, Mell and Kaori Utatsuki under the name Love Planet Five. Three months later, she performed the second ending theme to the series Hayate the Combat Butler, "Get My Way!". Kawada's next single, "Joint", was released on October 31, 2007; the title track is used as the opening theme to the series Shakugan no Shana Second. The single marked the first time her single reached the Top 10 on the Oricon weekly charts as it reached number 9 in its first week; the single eventually sold 37,000 copies and charted for 19 weeks. She performed at her first live concert outside Japan on January 19, 2008, at the KHS Hall in Taiwan. In late March 2008, Kawada released her second album Savia. The album includes "Sense", used as the ending theme of episode 24 of Shakugan no Shana Second, as well as "Akai Namida" and "Get My Way!". The album also includes the song "Hisui" (翡翠 -HISUI-), which was used as the ending theme to the 2008 Japanese theatrical film OneeChan Bara. It peaked at number 15 on the weekly charts and charted for five weeks.

=== 2008–10: Linkage ===
In 2008, Kawada released "PSI-Missing" and "Masterpiece", which were used as opening theme songs to the anime series A Certain Magical Index. The singles' B-sides, "Ame" (雨; "Rain") and "Jellyfish" respectively, were also used as insert songs in the series. In late 2008, Kawada opened her official website together with her official fan club M.A.L.L., an acronym that stands for "Mami Artist Lasting Live".

In June 2009, Kawada released the single "L'Oiseau bleu", which was originally included in the I've Sound 10th Anniversary 「Departed to the future」 Special CD BOX released on March 25, 2009. Kawada also performed the opening and ending themes to the original video animation series Shakugan no Shana S. The opening theme "Prophecy" was released on November 18, 2009.

On March 24, 2010, Kawada released her third album Linkage. containing the singles "PSI-Missing", "Masterpiece" and "Prophecy", as well as the ending theme to Shakugan no Shana S, "All in Good Time", and a cover of the song "Dreams", originally performed by the Irish rock band The Cranberries. In the same year, she started writing lyrics for other I've singers, beginning with "Piece of My Heart", an insert song used in the eroge Love, Election and Chocolate, sung by Nami Maisaki; Kawada also performed the game's opening theme "Initiative".

=== 2010–12: Square the Circle ===
In autumn 2010, Kawada performed the opening theme to the second season of A Certain Magical Index, "No Buts!", which eventually became her highest charting single to date, reaching number 6 in its first week on the Oricon weekly charts.

On February 16, 2011, she released her 10th single "See Visions", the second opening theme to the second season of Index. Four months later, she wrote the lyrics for the song "Lead to the Smile", the solo debut of I've singer Rin Asami, who started her career that year. In 2012, she performed three songs for the third Shana series Shakugan no Shana Final: "Serment" was the second opening theme song; "U/N" was used as the ending theme for episode 15; and "Kōbō" (光芒; "Beam of Light") was used as the ending theme for episode 24. Later, she released the single "Borderland" on May 29, 2012; the title track is used as the opening theme to the anime television series Jormungand. She released a new album titled Square the Circle on August 8, 2012.

=== 2013–16: Parablepsia ===
Kawada wrote the song "Recall", which was used as the ending theme to the 2013 anime television series Amnesia; the song was performed by Ray. She released a greatest hits album titled Mami Kawada Best: Birth on her birthday, February 13, 2013, which includes all of her singles except for "Prophecy". It also includes "Fixed Star", the ending theme to the film A Certain Magical Index: The Movie – The Miracle of Endymion. The album peaked at number 4 on the Oricon daily charts and at 15 on the Oricon weekly charts. "Fixed Star" was released as a single on February 20, 2013. She performed the song "Snap Out of It!!" together with Maon Kurosaki, which was included on the music collection Toaru Majutsu no TV Songs released on August 28, 2013. Kawada released the single "Break a Spell" on February 26, 2014; the title track is used as the second ending theme to the anime television series Tokyo Ravens. She wrote the songs "Lull (Soshite Bokura wa)" (lull ～そして僕らは～; "Lull (And We Are)") and "Ebb and Flow", which were used as ending themes to the 2013 anime television series Nagi-Asu: A Lull in the Sea; both songs were sung by Ray.

Kawada made an appearance at the Bangkok Comic Con in Bangkok, Thailand in July 2014, and the Animao Anime Music Festival event in Shanghai, China in November 2014. She performed the song "Wings of Courage (Sora o Koete)" (Wings of Courage —空を超えて—; "Wings of Courage (Beyond the Sky)"), which is used as the opening theme to the 2014 visual novel Aokana: Four Rhythm Across the Blue, as well as the song "Belief", which is used in the 2014 video game Dengeki Bunko: Fighting Climax. She made an appearance at the Animax Carnival event in Kuala Lumpur, Malaysia in 2015. She released the single "Gardens" on August 5, 2015; the title track is used as the ending theme to the second season of the anime television series To Love-Ru Darkness. In August 2015, her fanclub merged with I've Sound's fanclub I'VEs to form a new fanclub called I've Members.

Kawada released her fifth album Parablepsia on September 16, 2015, which includes her singles "Borderland" and "Break a spell", as well as the songs "Howl" and "Here", which were used in the pachinko game Black Lagoon 2. She released the single "Contrail (Kiseki)" (Contrail～軌跡～) on January 27, 2016; the title track is used as the opening theme to the 2016 anime television series adaptation of Aokana: Four Rhythm Across the Blue.

=== Retirement ===
On January 24, 2016, during the anime concert LisAni, Kawada announced her retirement from the music industry after her final concert on May 21, 2016, at the Tokyo Dome City Hall. Her song "Believe in the sky", which is used as the theme song to the 2016 smartphone game Ao no Kanata no Four Rhythm: Eternal Sky, was released in an AoKana vocal album on May 1, 2016, A final compilation album titled Mami Kawada Best "F" was released on November 22, 2016; the limited edition includes three Blu-ray discs featuring her music videos, a video recording of her final concert, and a documentary on her career and final concert. A video recording of her final concert was made available through streaming on D Anime Store's website. She made an appearance at NBCUniversal Entertainment Japan's 25th anniversary concert on February 3, 2018, where she announced her marriage to long-time producer Tomoyuki Nakazawa. She also wrote the lyrics to the song "Gravitation", which was used as the opening theme to the anime series A Certain Magical Index III; the song was performed by Maon Kurosaki. Although retired from professional singing, she remains active as a lyricist and occasional composer.

In 2026, Kawada was announced as a vocalist on a cover of Maon Kurosaki's "Magic∞world" for Kurosaki's memorial tribute album Memories Last, marking her first studio recording since 2016.

== Musical style and influences ==
Kawada's musical style mainly fuses rock with trance. When Kawada debuted in 2001, she originally felt that the music she earned in her career was pocket money. She also felt happy that she could be based in Sapporo where she could be close to her family and friends, as well as to I've Sound who she felt was like a second family to her. After Kotoko made her major debut in 2004, I've Sound management began discussing the possibility of Kawada making a major debut. At first, she was hesitant because she felt that she would be thrust into the spotlight, but eventually she accepted the idea. For the first ten years of her career, she always felt that she was a beginner, but this began to change when younger singers made their debuts and began to treat her as an older sister.

In an interview with Famitsu, Kawada related her experience writing the lyrics for "Joint". Kawada said that she was challenged in writing lyrics for the song, since her previous single "Get My Way" was different from her previous singles. Kawada would read the source material of every anime before writing lyrics for its theme songs. She named the song "Joint" because of Shana II's theme of characters Shana and Yūji Sakai fighting together. In response to comments that the expressions in her voice were very varied, Kawada stated that she simply sings with the music in the way that she most enjoys.

Kawada's primary producer was I've producer Tomoyuki Nakazawa, who produced "Radiance" as well as her first three albums. Nakazawa also came up with each album's concept and title. However, in 2010, Kawada began to collaborate more with other producers and also began working more in Tokyo. When producing Square the Circle, Nakazawa asked Kawada what sort of album and what sort of songs did she want. Kawada said that she wanted an album whose songs would be reminiscent of her visual image and stage persona, as opposed to her private self.

In making the album Parablepsia, Kawada describes the concept of the album as "E.M.R.", which stands for "Electric. Mami Kawada. Rock". She considers "Borderland" to be most representative of her style, so she wanted to make an album which included songs which sounded similar to it. Originally, she only wanted a single song to convey the theme of the album, but for Parablepsia, several songs do. This includes the title song "Parablepsia", which she describes as a song about not losing yourself in a society which moves around in circles, "Fly Blind", which is a song about not always allowing yourself to be influenced by society, "Eager Eyes", which is the song in the album which has the closest style to "Borderland", "It's no big deal", which takes inspiration from a phrase that her father used to say to her, and "Dendritic Quartz", which is about flowers which constantly bloom and will never wither; "Dendritic Quartz" takes inspiration from a pendant she owns which has a pattern of trees.

== Discography ==
The discography of Mami Kawada consists of five studio albums, two compilation albums, two video albums, and sixteen singles.

Studio albums

- Seed (2006)
- Savia (2008)
- Linkage (2010)
- Square the Circle (2012)
- Parablepsia (2015)
