= Seed (Mami Kawada album) =

- Limited Edition

Studio album by Mami Kawada
- Released: March 29, 2006
- Genre: J-Pop
- Length: 58:10
- Label: Geneon
- Producer: I've Sound

Mami Kawada chronology
Seed (2006)	Savia (2008)

Alternative cover
- Regular Edition

Seed is Mami Kawada's debut album which was released on March 29, 2006. This album is under Geneon and was produced by I've Sound. This album also includes her first two singles "Radiance / Chi ni Kaeru: On the Earth", and "Hishoku no Sora" and the collaboration single "Face of Fact (Resolution Ver.)" with KOTOKO. It peaked at the #12 spot in the Oricon charts and charted for 5 weeks.

The album will come in a limited CD+DVD edition (GNCA-1080) and a regular CD only edition (GNCA-1081). The DVD will contain the promotional video for SEED.

== Track listing ==
1. roots—4:13
  Composition: Tomoyuki Nakazawa
  Arrangement: Tomoyuki Nakazawa, Maiko Iuchi
2. Hishoku no Sora (緋色の空)—4:15
  Composition: Tomoyuki Nakazawa
  Arrangement: Tomoyuki Nakazawa, Takeshi Ozaki
  Lyrics: Mami Kawada
3. Radiance—4:21
  Composition & Arrangement: Tomoyuki Nakazawa
  Lyrics: Mami Kawada & KOTOKO
4. Seed—5:30
  Composition: Tomoyuki Nakazawa
  Arrangement: Tomoyuki Nakazawa, Takeshi Ozaki
  Lyrics: Mami Kawada
5. Precious - 4:59
  Composition: Shinji Orito
  Arrangement: Tomoyuki Nakazawa, Takeshi Ozaki
  Lyrics: Mami Kawada
6. Kanashimi no Mori (悲しみの森)—5:45
  Composition: Tomoyuki Nakazawa
  Arrangement: C.G mix
  Lyrics: Mami Kawada
7. IMMORAL—4:26
  Composition & Arrangement: Tomoyuki Nakazawa
  Lyrics: KOTOKO
8. Hirusagari no Gogo (昼下がりの午後)—5:09
  Composition & Arrangement: Maiko Iuchi
  Lyrics: Mami Kawada
9. Not Fill—5:09
  Composition & Arrangement: Kazuya Takase, Tomoyuki Nakazawa
  Lyrics: Mami Kawada
10. Undelete—5:19
  Composition: Tomoyuki Nakazawa
  Arrangement: Tomoyuki Nakazawa, Maiko Iuchi
  Lyrics: Mami Kawada
11. You give... -- 5:02
  Composition & Arrangement: Maiko Iuchi
  Lyrics: Mami Kawada
12. another planet ～twilight～ -- 4:01
  Composition: Tomoyuki Nakazawa
  Arrangement: Maiko Iuchi
  Lyrics: Mami Kawada

== Charts and sales ==
Oricon Ranking (Weekly)	Sales
12	25,100
