= Akai Namida/Beehive =

Single by Mami Kawada

from the album SAVIA
- Released: May 9, 2007
- Genre: J-pop
- Length: 17:12
- Label: Geneon
- Songwriter: Mami Kawada
- Producer: I've Sound

Mami Kawada singles chronology
"'Hishoku no Sora'" (2005)	"Akai Namida/Beehive" (2007)	"'Get my way!'" (2007)

"Akai Namida/Beehive" (赤い涙 / Beehive, Red Tears/Beehive) is Mami Kawada's third maxi single and it was released on May 9, 2007. Akai Namida was used as an insert song for the movie of Shakugan no Shana. This single reached #21 spot on the Oricon charts and has a total sales of 10,160 copies. It stayed in the weekly charts for four weeks.

The single will come in a limited CD+DVD edition (GNCA-0053) and a regular CD only edition (GNCA-0054). The DVD will contain the promotional video for Beehive.

== Track listing ==
1. Akai Namida (赤い涙) - 4:19
  Composition by: Tomoyuki Nakazawa
  Arrangement by: Tomoyuki Nakazawa
  Lyrics: Mami Kawada
2. Beehive - 4:18
  Composition by: Tomoyuki Nakazawa
  Arrangement by: Tomoyuki Nakazawa, Takeshi Ozaki
  Lyrics: Mami Kawada
3. Akai Namida (instrumental) (赤い涙) - 4:19
4. Beehive (instrumental) - 4:16

== Charts and sales ==
Oricon Ranking (Weekly)	Sales	Time in chart
21	10,160	4 weeks
