= See Visions =

"See visionS"

Single by Mami Kawada
- B-side: "Don't interrupt me, PSI-missing -2011 remix-"
- Released: February 16, 2011
- Genre: J-pop
- Label: Geneon
- Songwriter: Mami Kawada
- Producer: I've Sound

Mami Kawada singles chronology
"No Buts!" (2010)	"See visionS" (2011)	"Serment" (2012)

"See visionS" is the tenth single released by the J-pop singer Mami Kawada on February 16, 2011. Its title track was later released on the album Square the Circle. The title track is used as the second opening theme for the second season of the anime series A Certain Magical Index. Overall, this is Kawada's sixth tie-in with said anime series.

The single came in a limited CD+DVD edition (GNCV-0029) and a regular edition (GNCV-0030). The DVD contains the promotional video for "See visionS".

== Track listing ==
1. See visionS
  Lyrics: Mami Kawada
  Composition/Arrangement: Maiko Iuchi
2. Don't interrupt me
  Lyrics: Mami Kawada
  Composition: Tomoyuki Nakazawa
  Arrangement: Tomoyuki Nakazawa, Takeshi Ozaki
3. See visionS (instrumental)
4. Don't interrupt me (instrumental)
5. PSI-Missing -2011 remix-
  Lyrics: Mami Kawada
  Composition: Tomoyuki Nakazawa
  Arrangement: Tomoyuki Nakazawa, Takeshi Ozaki

== Charts and sales ==
Chart (2010)	Peak position
Oricon Daily Chart	10
Oricon Weekly Chart	14
Sales	9,313
Total Sales	17,595
