= Radiance / Chi ni Kaeru (On the Earth) =

"radiance / Chi ni Kaeru: ～on the Earth～"
- Limited edition front cover

Single by Mami Kawada, Kotoko

from the album Seed
- Released: February 23, 2005
- Genre: J-pop
- Length: 24:27
- Label: Geneon
- Songwriters: Mami Kawada, Kotoko
- Producer: I've Sound

Alternative cover
- Limited edition back cover

Mami Kawada singles chronology
"Radiance / Chi ni Kaeru: on the Earth" (2005)	"Hishoku no Sora" (2005)

Kotoko singles chronology
"Re-sublimity" (2004)	"Radiance / Chi ni Kaeru: On the Earth" (2005)	"421: A Will" (2005)

"Radiance / Chi ni Kaeru: ～on the Earth～" (Radiance/地に還る: On the Earth) is Mami Kawada's first single for a major label and Kotoko's third, produced by I've Sound. The songs were used as the opening and ending themes, respectively, for the anime series Starship Operators. Two versions of the single were released: a limited edition (GNCA-0014) and a regular edition (GNCA-0015). The limited edition included a DVD containing the promotional video for both songs. The single reached #19 on the Oricon charts and stayed for 9 weeks. It sold a total of 28,706 copies.

== Track listing ==
1. "Radiance" 4:21
  - Lyrics by: Mami Kawada & Kotoko
  - Composition & arrangement by: Tomoyuki Nakazawa
  - Performed by: Mami Kawada
2. Chi ni Kaeru: ～on the Earth～ (地に還る) – 5:44
  - Lyrics & composition by: Kotoko
  - Arrangement by: Youichi Shimada
  - Performed by: Kotoko
3. Radiance (Original Karaoke) – 4:20
4. Chi ni Kaeru: ～on the Earth～ (Original Karaoke) (地に還る) – 5:44
5. Radiance (Instrumental) – 4:18

== Charts and sales ==
Oricon Ranking (Weekly)	Sales	Weeks on chart
19	28,706	9
