= Linkage (album) =

- CD+DVD edition

Studio album by Mami Kawada
- Released: March 24, 2010
- Genre: J-pop, Electronica, Trance
- Length: 58:10
- Label: Geneon
- Producer: I've Sound

Mami Kawada chronology
Savia (2008)	Linkage (2010)	Square The Circle (2012)

Alternative cover
- CD only Edition

Linkage (styled as LINKAGE) is the third album by J-pop singer Mami Kawada. It was released on March 24, 2010 under Geneon Universal Entertainment. This album contains thirteen tracks which includes her singles "PSI-Missing", "Masterpiece" and "Prophecy". This album also contains the ending theme for the original video animation anime series Shakugan no Shana S entitled "All In Good Time" and a cover song of The Cranberries' hit song entitled "Dreams".

This album came in a limited CD+DVD edition (GNCV-1017) and a regular CD-only edition (GNCV-1018). The DVD contains the music video for the title track "Linkage".

== Track listing ==
1. succession—0:56
  Composition: Tomoyuki Nakazawa
  Arrangement: Tomoyuki Nakazawa, Takeshi Ozaki
2. CLIMAX—4:05
  Composition: Tomoyuki Nakazawa
  Arrangement: Tomoyuki Nakazawa, Takeshi Ozaki
3. PSI-missing—4:21
  Lyrics: Mami Kawada
  Composition: Tomoyuki Nakazawa
  Arrangement: Tomoyuki Nakazawa, Takeshi Ozaki
4. TOY—4:10
  Lyrics: Mami Kawada
  Composition/Arrangement: Maiko Iuchi
5. Kotoba, Kokoro no Koe (言葉、心の声)—5:00
  Lyrics: Mami Kawada
  Composition: Kazuya Takase
  Arrangement: Mai Nakazaki
6. Prophecy—4:50
  Lyrics: Mami Kawada
  Composition/Arrangement: Tomoyuki Nakazawa, Takeshi Ozaki
7. in answer—4:52
  Lyrics: Mami Kawada
  Composition/Arrangement: C.G mix
8. masterpiece—4:37
  Lyrics: Mami Kawada
  Composition/Arrangement: Maiko Iuchi
9. Awareness (アウェアネス)—5:24
  Lyrics: Mami Kawada
  Composition/Arrangement: Kazuya Takase
10. linkage—4:26
  Lyrics: Mami Kawada
  Composition: Tomoyuki Nakazawa
  Arrangement: Tomoyuki Nakazawa, Takeshi Ozaki
11. Mirai no Tsubu ～I'm formed～ (未来の粒)—5:30
  Lyrics: Mami Kawada
  Composition/Arrangement: Maiko Iuchi
12. All in good time—5:06
  Lyrics: Mami Kawada
  Composition/Arrangement: Tomoyuki Nakazawa, Takeshi Ozaki
13. Dreams—4:43
  Lyrics: Dolores O'Riordan, Noel Hogan

== Sales trajectory ==
Chart (2009)	Peak position
Oricon Daily Chart	11
Oricon Weekly Chart	26
Time in Chart	4 weeks
Sales	9,237
