= Prophecy (Mami Kawada song) =

Single by Mami Kawada

from the album Linkage
- B-side: "a frame"
- Released: November 18, 2009
- Recorded: 2009
- Genre: J-pop
- Length: 17:58
- Label: Geneon
- Songwriter: Mami Kawada
- Producer: I've Sound

Mami Kawada singles chronology
"L'Oiseau bleu" (2009)	"Prophecy" (2009)	"No Buts!" (2010)

"Prophecy" is the eighth single released by the J-pop singer, Mami Kawada, released on November 18, 2009. The title track was used as the opening theme for Shakugan no Shana S, an OVA of the anime series Shakugan no Shana. Overall, it is Kawada's fifth tie-in with the said anime series.

The single came in a limited CD+DVD edition (GNCV-0007) and a regular edition (GNCV-0008). The DVD contains the promotional video for "Prophecy".

The single peaked at #34 in the Oricon weeklies charting for only three weeks making this Kawada's least successful single to date.

== Track listing ==
1. Prophecy
  Lyrics: Mami Kawada
  Composition/Arrangement: Tomoyuki Nakazawa, Takeshi Ozaki
2. a frame
  Lyrics: Mami Kawada
  Composition/Arrangement: Tomoyuki Nakazawa, Takeshi Ozaki
3. Prophecy -instrumental-
4. a frame -instrumental-

== Sales trajectory ==
Chart (2009)	Peak position
Oricon Daily Chart	20
Oricon Weekly Chart	34
Sales	4,713
