= Get My Way! =

"Get my way!"

Single by Mami Kawada

from the album SAVIA
- B-side: "Aozora to Taiyou"
- Released: August 8, 2007
- Genre: J-Pop
- Length: 14:31
- Label: Geneon
- Songwriter: Mami Kawada
- Producer: I've Sound

Mami Kawada singles chronology
"Akai Namida/Beehive" (2007)	"Get my way!" (2007)	"JOINT" (2007)

"Get my way!" is the fourth single from J-pop singer Mami Kawada under Geneon Entertainment. The title track was used as the second outro theme for the anime series Hayate no Gotoku. The single reached #27 on the Oricon charts selling roughly 7,253 copies making this as Kawada's least successful single to date.

The single comes in a limited CD+DVD edition (GNCA-0069) and a regular CD only edition (GNCA-0070). The DVD contains the promotional video for Get my way!.

== Track listing ==
1. Get my way! - 2:56
  Composition by: Kazuya Takase
  Arrangement by: Kazuya Takase, Takeshi Ozaki
  Lyrics: Mami Kawada
2. Aozora to Taiyou (青空と太陽) - 4:21
  Composition by: Tomoyuki Nakazawa
  Arrangement by: Tomoyuki Nakazawa, Takeshi Ozaki
  Lyrics: Mami Kawada
3. Get my way! (instrumental) - 2:56
4. Aozora to Taiyou (instrumental) (青空と太陽) - 4:18

== Charts and sales ==
Oricon Ranking (Weekly)	Sales	Time in chart
27	12,111	5 weeks
