= Masterpiece (Mami Kawada song) =

"masterpiece"

Single by Mami Kawada

from the album Linkage
- B-side: "jellyfish"
- Released: February 4, 2009
- Genre: J-Pop
- Length: 18:04
- Label: Geneon
- Songwriter: Mami Kawada
- Producer: I've Sound

Mami Kawada singles chronology
| "PSI-Missing" (2008) | "masterpiece" (2009) | "L'Oiseau bleu" (2009) |

"masterpiece" is the seventh single released by the J-pop singer, Mami Kawada, and was released on February 4, 2009. The title track was used as the second opening theme for the anime series A Certain Magical Index which is her third tie-in with the anime series. This is also Kawada's first single to be produced by a female composer/arranger of I've Sound, which is Maiko Iuchi.

The coupling song jellyfish was used as an insert song on the twenty-third episode of A Certain Magical Index making this Kawada's 4th tie-in with the said anime series.

The single will come in a limited CD+DVD edition (GNCV-0013) and a regular edition (GNCV-0014). The DVD will contain the Promotional Video for masterpiece.

== Track listing ==
1. masterpiece—4:37
  Lyrics: Mami Kawada
  Composition/Arrangement: Maiko Iuchi
2. jellyfish—4:26
  Lyrics: Mami Kawada
  Composition: Tomoyuki Nakazawa
  Arrangement: Tomoyuki Nakazawa, Takeshi Ozaki
3. masterpiece (instrumental) -- 4:37
4. jellyfish (instrumental) -- 4:24

== Reception ==
It peak ranked 12th on the weekly Oricon singles chart and remained on the chart for nine weeks.
