= No Buts! =

"No buts!"

Single by Mami Kawada
- B-side: "SATANIC"
- Released: November 3, 2010
- Genre: J-pop
- Label: Geneon
- Songwriters: Mami Kawada, Tomoyuki Nakazawa
- Producer: I've Sound

Mami Kawada singles chronology
"Prophecy" (2009)	"No buts!" (2010)	"See visionS" (2011)

"No buts!" is the ninth single released by the J-pop singer Mami Kawada. It was released as a single on November 3, 2010, and its title track was later released on the album Square the Circle. The title track is used as the first opening theme for the second season of the anime series A Certain Magical Index. Overall, this is Kawada's fifth tie-in with said anime series.

The single came in a limited CD+DVD edition (GNCV-0027) and a regular edition (GNCV-0028). The DVD contains the promotional video for "No buts!".

== Overview ==
The first limited edition (GNCV-0027) and the regular edition (GNCV-0028) were released. The former includes a DVD with the music video of "No buts!

The title song "No buts! According to Kawada, the song is based on the image of Kamijou Touma, the main character in the "Toaru Majutsu no Index" series.

No buts!" was first performed at the "Dengeki GENEON Music Fest" talk, live, and screening event held at JCB HALL on September 26, 2010, and was first aired on "A&G Super Radio Show - Anispa! before it was used in the TV anime.

This is the eighth time that Mami Kawada has tied up with an anime work written by Dengeki Bunko and produced by J.C. STAFF, following her previous song "Prophecy". (Note: 過去のタイアップは『スターシップ・オペレーターズ』、『灼眼のシャナ』シリーズ（4度）、及び『とある魔術の禁書目録』シリーズ（2度）)

On the Oricon Weekly Chart dated November 15, 2010, it entered the Oricon Top 10 for the first time since "JOINT" and reached No. 6, her highest position, surpassing her previous record of No. 9 set by "JOINT".

== Track listing ==
1. No buts!
  Lyrics: Mami Kawada
  Composition: Tomoyuki Nakazawa
  Arrangement: Tomoyuki Nakazawa, Takeshi Ozaki
2. SATANIC
  Lyrics: Mami Kawada
  Composition: Tomoyuki Nakazawa
  Arrangement: Tomoyuki Nakazawa, Takeshi Ozaki
3. No buts! (instrumental)
4. SATANIC (instrumental)

== Sales trajectory ==
Chart (2010)	Peak position
Oricon Daily Chart	5
Oricon Weekly Chart	6
Sales	12,495
Total Sales	24,551
