= Shakugan no Shana =

Japanese light novel series and its franchise

- Shakugan no Shana light novel volume 1, featuring Shana

灼眼のシャナ
- Genre: Drama, supernatural
- Light novel
- Written by: Yashichiro Takahashi
- Illustrated by: Noizi Ito
- Published by: ASCII Media Works
- English publisher: NA: Viz Media (formerly)
- Imprint: Dengeki Bunko
- Magazine: Dengeki Bunko Magazine
- Original run: November 9, 2002 – November 10, 2023
- Volumes: 27
- Manga
- Written by: Yashichiro Takahashi
- Illustrated by: Ayato Sasakura
- Published by: ASCII Media Works
- English publisher: NA: Viz Media
- Magazine: Dengeki Daioh
- Original run: February 21, 2005 – August 27, 2011
- Volumes: 10
- Anime television series
- Directed by: Takashi Watanabe
- Written by: Yasuko Kobayashi
- Music by: Kow Otani
- Studio: J.C.Staff
- Licensed by: Crunchyroll (Note: Formerly known as Funimation.); AUS: Universal/Sony; PH: TV5; UK: MVM Films
- Original network: Animax, MBS, TVA, TVS, Chiba TV, tvk
- English network: SEA: Animax Asia; US: Funimation Channel
- Original run: October 6, 2005 – March 23, 2006
- Episodes: 24
Further information
Video game
Developer	Vridge
Publisher	MediaWorks
Genre	Action RPG, Visual novel
Platform	PlayStation 2, Nintendo DS
Released	JP: March 23, 2006 (PS2); JP: March 29, 2007 (DS)
Original video animation
Shakugan no Shana SP
Directed by	Takashi Watanabe
Written by	Yasuko Kobayashi
Music by	Kow Otani
Studio	J.C.Staff
Licensed by	AUS: Universal/Sony; NA: Funimation; UK: MVM Films
Released	December 8, 2006
Runtime	24 minutes
Anime film
Directed by	Takashi Watanabe; Shigeru Ueda (co-director)
Written by	Yasuko Kobayashi
Music by	Kow Otani
Studio	J.C.Staff
Licensed by	AUS: Universal/Sony; NA: Funimation
Released	April 21, 2007
Runtime	90 minutes
Manga
Shakugan no Shana X Eternal song: Harukanaru Uta
Written by	Yashichiro Takahashi
Illustrated by	Shii Kiya
Published by	ASCII Media Works
Magazine	Dengeki Black Maoh; Dengeki Maoh
Original run	September 19, 2007 – July 26, 2012
Volumes	5
Anime television series
Shakugan no Shana Second
Directed by	Takashi Watanabe
Written by	Yasuko Kobayashi
Music by	Kow Otani
Studio	J.C.Staff
Licensed by	AUS: Universal/Sony; NA: Funimation; UK: MVM Films
Original network	MBS, TBS, CBC, Animax
English network	PH: TV5; SEA: Animax Asia
Original run	October 5, 2007 – March 28, 2008
Episodes	24
Original video animation
Shakugan no Shana S
Directed by	Takashi Watanabe
Written by	Yasuko Kobayashi
Music by	Kow Otani
Studio	J.C.Staff
Licensed by	AUS: Universal/Sony; NA: Funimation; UK: MVM Films
Released	October 23, 2009 – September 29, 2010
Runtime	24 minutes each
Episodes	4
Anime television series
Shakugan no Shana Final
Directed by	Takashi Watanabe
Written by	Yasuko Kobayashi
Music by	Kow Otani
Studio	J.C.Staff
Licensed by	AUS: Universal/Sony; NA: Funimation; UK: MVM Films
Original network	Tokyo MX, Chiba TV, TV Kanagawa, MBS, CBC, AT-X, BS11
English network	SEA: Animax Asia
Original run	October 8, 2011 – March 24, 2012
Episodes	24
- icon

Shakugan no Shana (Japanese: 灼眼のシャナ; lit. "Burning-Eyed Shana"), also known simply as Shana (シャナ), is a Japanese light novel series written by Yashichiro Takahashi with illustrations by Noizi Ito. ASCII Media Works published 27 novels from November 2002 to November 2023 under their Dengeki Bunko imprint. The story focuses on Yuji Sakai, a high school boy who becomes involved in an age-old conflict between forces of balance and imbalance in existence. In the process, he befriends a fighter for the balancing force and names her "Shana". The series also incorporates fantasy and slice of life elements.

Two manga adaptations were published by ASCII Media Works in Dengeki Daioh and Dengeki Maoh. Between 2005 and 2012, the series was adapted by J.C.Staff into three 24-episode anime television series, a four-episode original video animation (OVA) series, an animated film, and a standalone OVA episode. A PlayStation 2 video game was released in March 2006, which was ported to the Nintendo DS in March 2007. Viz Media licensed the novels and the first manga series for release in North America, but stopped publishing both prematurely. Critics praised the series for its execution of typical story elements.

== Setting and plot ==
Shakugan no Shana follows an age-old conflict between the human world and the Crimson Realm (紅世, Guze), which is its parallel universe. The inhabitants of the Crimson Realm, the Crimson Denizens (紅世の徒, Guze no Tomogara), can manipulate the Power of Existence (存在の力, Sonzai no Chikara), which serves as the "fuel" for a being's existence. Denizens with exceptional power among their peers are known as Lords of the Crimson Realm (紅世の王, Guze no Ō), while more powerful Lords are known as Gods (神, Kami). Denizens who do not care about the balance between the two realms aim to gather the Power of Existence from humans to use for their own purposes. It is the duty of Flame Hazes (フレイムヘイズ, Fureimu Heizu), humans who have contracted with a Crimson Lord, to maintain this balance by killing Denizens who disrupt it. Denizens and Flame Hazes fight using magic spells called Powers of Unrestraint (自在法, Jizaihō), which are also known as Unrestricted Spells or Unrestricted Methods. One such spell is the Seal (封絶, Fūzetsu), which creates a space where the Crimson Realm and the human world intersect and causalities, including time, are stopped.

The story mainly takes place in Misaki City in Japan. It begins when high school student Yuji Sakai enters the conflict after a Flame Haze tells him that he died some time ago and that he is a Torch (トーチ, Tōchi), a human with greatly diminished Power of Existence which will eventually run out. Yuji is also a Mystes (ミステス, Misutesu), a special kind of Torch who can move within Seals and contains a Treasure Tool (宝具, Hōgu), a magical object that the Denizens created which can provide special abilities or Powers of Unrestraint. Unfazed by his apparent death, Yuji befriends the girl and names her "Shana" after her sword. They later discover that the Treasure Tool within Yuji is the Reiji Maigo (零時迷子, Midnight Lost Child), which restores his Power of Existence every midnight.

Over time, Shana and Yuji encounter other Flame Hazes, such as Margery Daw and Wilhelmina Carmel, and an organization of Denizens called Bal Masqué discovers that Yuji possesses the Reiji Maigo and seek to use it for their own ends. The organization is led by Hecate, Sydonay, and Bel Peol, three Lords collectively known as the Trinity who serve under the Snake of the Festival (祭礼の蛇, Sairei no Hebi), a God who resides within the Reiji Maigo. When the Snake emerges, it merges its consciousness with Yuji's, taking command of Bal Masqué and plans to create a parallel world called Xanadu, which will serve as a paradise for Denizens with unlimited Power of Existence. Shana and the other Flame Hazes oppose the creation of Xanadu, as it would eventually cause large-scale disruptions in the human world, the Crimson Realm, and Xanadu itself.

Shana formulates a countermeasure and adds a law to Xanadu that forbids the Denizens from eating humans. With Xanadu created, the Denizens depart along with other Flame Hazes who are determined to help enforce order on it. Yuji intends to go to Xanadu alone and ensure that humans and Denizens can learn to coexist, but Shana refuses to be left behind. Yuji ultimately accepts Shana's feelings and the two kiss, activating a spell that Crimson Lord Lamia left for Yuji, which restores his existence and his humanity, meaning that he is no longer a Torch. With the help of another spell from Lamia, Yuji restores all humans in Misaki City whose existence the Denizens absorbed before he and Shana depart for Xanadu together.

== Production ==
In an early draft of what would later become Shakugan no Shana, Yashichiro Takahashi set the story in a different dimension and described the main character as having the initial personality of Shana, but the appearance of an older woman similar to Margery Daw. However, after talking with an editor, Takahashi rewrote the character to have the appearance of a young girl. In doing so, he used Shana's small build to symbolize a story of growth and to emphasize the physical conflict between her and her opponents. Noizi Ito was contacted in early August 2002 to be the illustrator for the series, and she was very excited to work on the project after she read the manuscript for the first novel; this was the first time Ito drew illustrations for a book.

Shortly before writing Shakugan no Shana, Takahashi made his debut as an author with A/B Extreme, which was awarded an honorable mention in the eighth Dengeki Novel Prize by MediaWorks (now ASCII Media Works) in 2001. By his own admission, A/B Extreme was too difficult for readers to understand, so for his next work, he set out to write something easier to grasp. As such, the initial premise of Shakugan no Shana was to write a boy meets girl story in a school setting, though initially love was not one of the themes included. He was given the freedom to write as he pleased based on this premise after showing it to his editor.

== Media ==
=== Light novels and books ===
Shakugan no Shana began as a light novel series written by Yashichiro Takahashi, with illustrations drawn by Noizi Ito. ASCII Media Works published 27 volumes between November 9, 2002, and November 10, 2023, under their Dengeki Bunko imprint; 22 comprise the main story, while the other five are short story collections. Some short stories were initially published in ASCII Media Works' Dengeki Bunko Magazine. Viz Media licensed the novels for English distribution in North America, but they only released two volumes in 2007. The novels are also licensed in South Korea by Daewon C.I., and in Taiwan and Hong Kong by Kadokawa Media.

A 160-page guide book titled Shakugan no Shana no Subete (灼眼のシャナノ全テ, All About Shakugan no Shana) was published on December 10, 2005, by ASCII Media Works. Two more guide books were published by ASCII Media Works for the anime adaptations: Anime Shakugan no Shana no Subete (アニメ 『灼眼のシャナ』 ノ全テ) on October 27, 2006, with 176 pages, and Anime Shakugan no Shana II no Subete (アニメ 『灼眼のシャナII』 ノ全テ) on October 19, 2009, with 168 pages. Four 128-page art books illustrated by Ito were published by ASCII Media Works: Guren (紅蓮) on February 25, 2005, Kaen (華焔) on August 9, 2007, Sōen (蒼炎) on August 10, 2009, and Shana (遮那) on August 9, 2013.

=== Manga ===
A manga adaptation, illustrated by Ayato Sasakura, was serialized in ASCII Media Works' manga magazine Dengeki Daioh between the April 2005 and October 2011 issues. The individual chapters were collected and published in ten tankōbon volumes from October 27, 2005, and October 27, 2011. A special limited-edition version of volume two was bundled with a booklet titled Grimoire including contributions from guest artists and writers for various illustrations, manga, and short stories. Viz Media licensed the manga for English distribution in North America. Viz released six volumes between April 17, 2007, and September 21, 2010, but then cancelled the release of the final four volumes. The manga is also licensed in South Korea by Daewon C.I., in Taiwan and Hong Kong by Kadokawa Media, and in Germany by Egmont.

A second manga illustrated by Shii Kiya, titled Shakugan no Shana X Eternal song: Harukanaru Uta (灼眼のシャナX Eternal song -遙かなる歌-), is based on the events of the tenth novel and began serialization in ASCII Media Works' manga magazine Dengeki Black Maoh on September 19, 2007. The manga was later transferred to Dengeki Maoh and ran in that magazine between the December 2009 and September 2012 issues. Five volumes were released between January 27, 2009, and September 27, 2012. The manga is licensed in South Korea by Daewon C.I., and in Taiwan and Hong Kong by Kadokawa Media.

=== Anime ===
A 24-episode anime television series adaptation of Shakugan no Shana aired in Japan between October 6, 2005, and March 23, 2006, on TV Kanagawa. Produced by J.C.Staff and directed by Takashi Watanabe, the screenplay was written by Yasuko Kobayashi, and chief animator Mai Otsuka based the character design used in the anime on Noizi Ito's original designs. The sound director is Jin Aketagawa, and the soundtrack is composed by Kow Otani. The series was later released by Geneon in eight DVD compilation volumes from January to August 2006. Later, an original video animation (OVA) episode titled Shakugan no Shana SP, which takes place after the events of episode 13, was released on December 8, 2006.

An anime film based on the first novel that was released in Japanese theaters on April 21, 2007, as one of three films released at Dengeki Bunko's Movie Festival. The staff who produced the anime series returned to produce the film. The version shown in theaters was 65 minutes in length. Those who saw the film in theaters could buy a short book titled Shakugan no Shana M containing two short stories written by Takahashi published by ASCII Media Works under the imprint Dengeki Gekijō Bunko. The film was released on DVD in Japan on September 21, 2007, in regular and special editions, which featured the full length 90-minute director's cut version. It was later released on Blu-ray Disc (BD) in Japan on July 27, 2011.

Shana's production staff would again return to produce two additional TV series and an OVA series. The 24-episode second season, titled Shakugan no Shana Second (灼眼のシャナII), aired between October 5, 2007, and March 28, 2008, on MBS. The series was later released by Geneon to eight DVD compilation volumes from January to August 2008. A four-episode OVA series titled Shakugan no Shana S was released on BD/DVD from October 23, 2009, to September 29, 2010. The 24-episode third season, titled Shakugan no Shana Final (灼眼のシャナIII -Final-), aired between October 8, 2011, and March 24, 2012, on Tokyo MX. The series was released by Geneon on eight BD/DVD compilation volumes from December 2011 to July 2012.

Geneon licensed the first TV series for North American distribution, but after Geneon withdrew from the North American market, Funimation took up the manufacturing, marketing, sales and distribution rights, though Geneon still retained the license. A DVD box set was released by Funimation in September 2008, and was re-released in September 2009 under Funimation's "Viridian Collection". Funimation later re-licensed the first series and re-released it in a BD/DVD combo pack on August 21, 2012. The series made its North American television debut on September 10, 2012, on the Funimation Channel. The first season and its accompanying OVA were also licensed by Madman Entertainment in Australia and New Zealand, and by MVM Films in the United Kingdom. Funimation later licensed the film, the second and third TV series, and the OVA series for release in North America, with a different English dub cast compared to the first anime season.

=== Audio CDs ===
For the first Shakugan no Shana anime series, four theme song singles were released for two opening and two ending themes. The first opening theme "Hishoku no Sora" (緋色の空, The Crimson Sky) by Mami Kawada was released in November 2005, and the second opening theme "Being" by Kotoko was released in March 2006. The first ending theme "Yoake Umarekuru Shōjo" (夜明け生まれ来る少女, The Girl Born at Dawn) by Yoko Takahashi was released in October 2005, and the second ending theme "Aka no Seijaku" (紅の静寂, Crimson Silence) by Yoko Ishida was released in February 2006. The original soundtrack for the first anime series was released in January 2006. For the Shakugan no Shana film, two theme song singles were released: the ending theme "Tenjō o Kakeru Monotachi" (天壌を翔る者たち, Those Who Scale Heaven and Earth) by Love Planet Five—made up of Kotoko, Kawada, Eiko Shimamiya, Mell, and Kaori Utatsuki—was released in April 2007; the insert song "Akai Namida" (赤い涙, Red Tears) by Kawada was released in May 2007. The film's original soundtrack was released in September 2007.

For Shakugan no Shana Second, two theme song singles were released for two opening and two ending themes. The first opening theme "Joint" by Kawada was released in October 2007, and the second opening theme "Blaze" by Kotoko was released in March 2008. The first ending theme is "Triangle" by Kawada and was released on the single for "Joint", and the second ending theme "Sociometry" by Kotoko was released on the single for "Blaze". The song "Sense" by Kawada was used as the final ending theme for episode 24, and was released on Kawada's album Savia in March 2008. The original soundtrack for Shakugan no Shana Second was released in January 2008. For Shakugan no Shana S, the single for the opening theme "Prophecy" by Kawada was released in November 2009, and the ending theme "All in Good Time" by Kawada was released on her album Linkage in March 2010. The song "Portamento" by Kawada was used as an insert song in episode 4, and was released on Savia.

For Shakugan no Shana Final, four theme song singles were released for two opening and two ending themes. The first opening theme "Light My Fire" by Kotoko was released in November 2011, and the second opening theme "Serment" by Kawada was released in February 2012. The first ending theme "I'll Believe" by Altima was released in December 2011, and the second ending theme "One" by Altima was released in February 2012. The song "Kōbō" (光芒, Beam of Light) by Kawada was used as the final ending theme for episode 24. Three insert songs by Kawada were also used in Shakugan no Shana Final: "u/n" in episode 15 released on the single for "Serment", "Akai Namida" in episode 19, and "Hishoku no Sora" in episode 24.

Three volumes of albums titled Shakugan no Shana Assorted Shana containing image songs, audio dramas and background music tracks were released between February and April 2006. Three volumes of albums titled Shakugan no Shana II Splendide Shana containing images songs and audio dramas were released between February and May 2008. Three volumes of albums titled Shakugan no Shana F Superiority Shana containing audio dramas, background music tracks, and short versions of theme songs from Shakugan no Shana Final were released between February and July 2012. The third Superiority Shana album also included the song "Kōbō". A compilation album of songs used in the series was released on January 24, 2018.

A weekly radio drama of Shakugan no Shana aired four episodes between November 29 and December 20, 2003, on Dengeki Taishō. The scenario was an original side-story written by Takahashi, and takes place between the first and second light novel volumes. The cast for the radio drama was different from the anime adaptations. A CD compilation of the radio drama titled Shakugan no Shana Drama Disc, including an additional audio drama, was eligible for mail orders up to March 31, 2004. Another drama CD was released with the April 2008 issue of Tokuma Shoten's Animage magazine; the cast is the same as with the anime versions.

=== Video games ===
An action RPG visual novel titled Shakugan no Shana, developed by Vridge and published by MediaWorks, was released on March 23, 2006, for the PlayStation 2 (PS2). A 36-page A4-sized art book titled Honō (焔) featuring illustrations by Ito was available to those who pre-ordered the game. The game was re-released as a "Best" version on February 7, 2008. The story was written by Takahashi, and features character designs by Ito. The opening theme song is "Exist" by Rie Kugimiya, which was released on volume one of the Assorted Shana albums. The player assumes the role of Yuji Sakai during the visual novel aspect, where much of the game's duration is spent on reading the text that appears on the screen, which represents the story's narrative and dialogue.

The game follows a branching plot line through eight chapters with five possible endings, and depending on the decisions that the player makes during the game, the plot will progress in a specific direction. Every so often, the player will come to a point where he or she is given the chance to choose from multiple options. Text progression pauses at these points until a choice is made. To view all plot lines in their entirety, the player will have to replay the game multiple times and choose different choices to further the plot to an alternate direction. Sometimes during text progression, an "active countdown" minigame appears, which requires the player to press the game buttons in a specific order in a set time limit. Success or failure in these minigames influence which endings are viewed. During the turn-based battle sequences, the player assumes the role of Shana. The player uses a combination of fire, powers of unrestraint, and treasure tools to battle Crimson Denizens; and Shana is also able to use a special attack and defend.

A Nintendo DS port of the game titled Shakugan no Shana DS, developed by Vridge and published by MediaWorks, was released on March 29, 2007. Those who pre-ordered the game received a calendar spanning April 2007 to March 2008, and an art book of rough sketches by Ito titled Tōka (灯火) was available for a limited time with the purchase of the game. A new story for the DS version was written by Takahashi. The game also contains an image gallery that allows the player to see what Shana and Yoshida Kazumi look like in different clothes, and a battle mode that lets the player fight against the computer with a character other than Shana.

Shana appears as a playable character in the crossover RPG Dengeki Gakuen RPG: Cross of Venus for the Nintendo DS, and other characters from Shakugan no Shana also appear in the game. Shana appears in the 2014 fighting game Dengeki Bunko: Fighting Climax, which features various Dengeki Bunko characters.

A gacha game titled Shakugan no Shana: Blaze Edge was released on the G123 platform on September 14, 2026.

== Reception ==
In October 2014, the novels were reported to have sold over 8.6 million copies. As reported on the obi strip on volume 4 of the Shakugan no Shana manga released in January 2008, 1.2 million copies of the manga had been sold. Theron Martin from Anime News Network reviewed the manga and called it "inferior" to the anime, and notes the anime develops characters better than the manga. Martin also critiques the art, saying the background art has little detail, and while the action scenes are handled well enough, they are still sub-par compared to the same scenes in the anime. Martin concludes the review by warning the readers that "[if] this is your first exposure to the franchise, look to the anime version to see it done right."

When reviewing the anime, Martin thought the first Shakugan no Shana always manages to slightly exceed expectations, and while its story elements may be typical, its execution is not. Martin noted that Shana's Flame Haze transformation is a visual highlight of the series, and other details are shown equal care. Reviewer Chris Beveridge of Mania.com felt uncomfortable about the morbid nature of the series. While Beveridge did not think the series is "groundbreaking", it proves to be a "solid title" that continuously gets better. The pacing in the middle of the first season was criticized for quickly ending an arc before "going into a storyline that feels out of character for the show." Martin's review of Shakugan no Shana Final was less positive; he described Yuji as having been made into a different character (though his complexity was praised), criticized the addition of a large number of prominent characters without sufficient development, and described some things as not making sense, although he praised Shana's development over the course of the third series.
