= Hishoku no Sora =

Single by Mami Kawada

from the album SEED
- B-side: "another planet"
- Released: November 9, 2005
- Genre: J-pop
- Length: 24:09
- Label: Geneon
- Composer: Tomoyuki Nakazawa
- Lyricist: Mami Kawada
- Producer: I've Sound

Mami Kawada singles chronology
"'radiance'" (2005)	"Hishoku no Sora" (2005)	"'Akai Namida/Beehive'" (2007)

"Hishoku no Sora" (緋色の空, Scarlet-colored Sky) is the second single of J-pop singer Mami Kawada. The title track was used as the first intro theme to the anime Shakugan no Shana. This single peaked at the #11 spot on the Oricon charts and has sold 16,503 copies on its first week. It stayed at the Oricon weekly charts for 18 weeks and sold a total of 36,661 copies overall.

The single will come in a limited CD+DVD edition (GNCA-0019) and a regular CD only edition (GNCA-0020). The DVD will contain the promotional video for Hishoku no Sora.

== Reception ==
The single peak ranked 11th on Oricon's Weekly Singles Chart and remained on the chart for eighteen weeks. Anime News Network's Theron Martin described the "synth-pop" track, "Hishoku no Sora", as "solid" and "enthusiastic (if not entirely original-sounding)".

== Track listing ==
1. Hishoku no Sora (緋色の空) - 4:15
  Lyrics: Mami Kawada
  Composition/Arrangement by: Tomoyuki Nakazawa
2. Another Planet - 5:50
  Lyrics: Mami Kawada
  Composition/Arrangement by: Tomoyuki Nakazawa
3. another planet ~twilight~ - 4:01
  Lyrics: Mami Kawada
  Composition by: Tomoyuki Nakazawa
  Arrangement by: Maiko Iuchi
4. Hishoku no Sora (instrumental) (緋色の空) - 4:14
5. another planet (instrumental) - 5:49
