= PSI-Missing =

"PSI-missing"

Single by Mami Kawada

from the album Linkage
- B-side: "Ame"
- Released: October 29, 2008
- Genre: J-pop
- Length: 18:02
- Label: Geneon
- Songwriter: Mami Kawada
- Producer: I've Sound

Mami Kawada singles chronology
"Joint" (2007)	"PSI-missing" (2008)	"Masterpiece" (2009)

"PSI-missing" is the sixth single released by the J-pop singer, Mami Kawada. This single was released on October 29, 2008, one year after the release of her fifth single, "Joint". The song was used as the first opening theme for the anime series A Certain Magical Index.

The B-side Ame (雨, Rain) was used as an insert song on the twelfth episode of A Certain Magical Index.

The single came in a limited CD+DVD edition (GNCV-0009) and a regular CD edition (GNCV-0010). The DVD contains the promotional video for "PSI-missing".

== Track listing ==
1. PSI-missing—4:23
  Composition: Tomoyuki Nakazawa
  Arrangement: Tomoyuki Nakazawa, Takeshi Ozaki
  Lyrics: Mami Kawada
2. Ame—4:40
  Composition: Tomoyuki Nakazawa
  Arrangement by: Tomoyuki Nakazawa, Takeshi Ozaki
  Lyrics: Mami Kawada
3. PSI-missing (instrumental) -- 4:23
4. Ame (instrumental) -- 4:36

== Reception ==
It peak ranked 14th on the weekly Oricon albums chart and remained on the chart for fourteen weeks.
