= List of Priyanka Chopra performances =

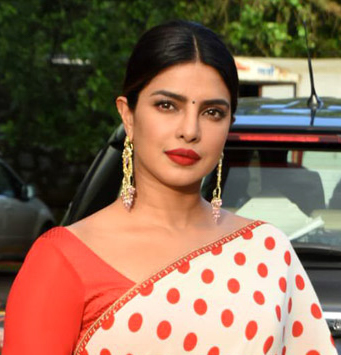
Chopra Jonas in 2019

Priyanka Chopra is an Indian actress, known for her roles in Hindi and English films. Chopra made her acting debut with the 2002 Tamil film Thamizhan. She made her Bollywood debut the following year with the spy thriller The Hero: Love Story of a Spy. The same year, Chopra's role in the box-office hit romance Andaaz won her the Filmfare Award for Best Female Debut and her first Filmfare Award for Best Supporting Actress nomination. In 2004, she starred in the commercially successful romantic comedy Mujhse Shaadi Karogi and garnered high critical acclaim for her breakthrough role in the romantic thriller Aitraaz which earned her the Filmfare Award for Best Performance in a Negative Role and a second Best Supporting Actress nomination. Chopra starred in six films in 2005, including Waqt and Bluffmaster!. In 2006, she starred in two of the highest-grossing films of the year—the superhero film Krrish and the action thriller Don.

In 2007 and 2008, Chopra starred in several critical and commercial failures, but in late 2008, her role in the acclaimed drama Fashion proved to be a turning point in her career. Her portrayal of a troubled model won her the National Film Award for Best Actress and the Filmfare Award for Best Actress. In 2009, Chopra starred in Vishal Bhardwaj's acclaimed caper thriller Kaminey, and played twelve distinct characters in the romantic comedy What's Your Raashee?. She won the Filmfare Award for Best Actress (Critics) for her portrayal of a serial killer in Bhardwaj's 2011 black comedy 7 Khoon Maaf.

Chopra subsequently starred in four of her most successful releases—the action films Don 2 (2011), Agneepath (2012) and Krrish 3 (2013), and the comedy-drama Barfi! (2012), all of which were among the highest grossing productions of their respective years. Her portrayal of an autistic woman in Barfi! and the eponymous boxer in the biographical sports drama Mary Kom earned her further acclaim. From 2015 to 2018, she starred as Alex Parrish on the ABC drama thriller series Quantico, becoming the first South Asian woman to headline an American network series. Also in 2015, Chopra starred alongside an ensemble cast in the comedy-drama Dil Dhadakne Do and won the Filmfare Award for Best Supporting Actress for portraying Kashibai in the period film Bajirao Mastani, one of the highest grossing Indian films of all time. In 2016, Chopra produced the Marathi comedy-drama Ventilator, a critical and commercial success. She appeared in multiple Hollywood films, including Baywatch (2017), and Isn't It Romantic? (2019). She (now Chopra Jonas) received praise for playing a protective mother in the biographical drama The Sky Is Pink (2019), which she also produced. Following supporting roles in the satirical drama The White Tiger and The Matrix Resurrections (both 2021), Chopra Jonas starred in the Amazon Prime Video action thriller series Citadel (2023).

== Film ==
Key
†	Denotes films that have not yet been released

=== As actress ===
Year	Title	Role	Notes	Ref.
2002	Thamizhan	Priya	Tamil film	
2003	The Hero: Love Story of a Spy	Shaheen Zakaria		
2003	Andaaz	Jiyana "Jiya" Singhania		
2004	Plan	Rani		
2004	Kismat	Sapna Gosai		
2004	Asambhav	Alisha		
2004	Mujhse Shaadi Karogi	Rani Singh		
2004	Aitraaz	Sonia Roy		
2005	Blackmail	Sanjana Rathod		
2005	Karam	Shalini Gupta		
2005	Waqt: The Race Against Time	Pooja Thakur		
2005	Yakeen	Simar Oberoi		
2005	Barsaat	Kajal Kapoor		
2005	Bluffmaster!	Simmi Ahuja		
2006	Taxi No. 9211	Herself	Cameo appearance	
2006	36 China Town	Seema	Cameo appearance	
2006	Alag	Herself	Special appearance in the song "Sabse Alag"	
2006	Krrish	Priya Mehra		
2006	Aap Ki Khatir	Anu Khanna		
2006	Don	Roma		
2007	Salaam-e-Ishq: A Tribute to Love	Kamna / Kamini Ranawat		
2007	Big Brother	Aarti Sharma		
2007	Om Shanti Om	Herself	Special appearance in the song "Deewangi Deewangi"	
2008	My Name is Anthony Gonsalves	Herself	Cameo appearance	
2008	Love Story 2050	Sana Bedi & Ziesha (Note: Chopra played dual roles in the film.)		
2008	God Tussi Great Ho	Alia Kapoor		
2008	Chamku	Shubhi		
2008	Drona	Sonia		
2008	Fashion	Meghna Mathur		
2008	Dostana	Neha Melwani		
2009	Billu	Herself	Special appearance in the song "Rockin & Reeling"	
2009	Kaminey	Sweety Bhope		
2009	What's Your Raashee?	Various (Note: Chopra played twelve distinct roles in the film: namely Anjali, Sanjana, Kajal, Hansa, Rajni, Chandrika, Mallika, Nandini, Pooja, Vishakha, Bhavna and Jhankhana.)		
2010	Pyaar Impossible!	Alisha Merchant		
2010	Jaane Kahan Se Aayi Hai	Herself	Cameo appearance	
2010	Anjaana Anjaani	Kiara Vaswani		
2011	7 Khoon Maaf	Susanna Anna-Marie Johannes		
2011	Ra.One	Desi Girl	Cameo appearance	
2011	Don 2	Roma		
2012	Agneepath	Kaali Gawde		
2012	Teri Meri Kahaani	Rukhsar, Radha & Aradhana (Note: Chopra played three distinct roles in the film.)		
2012	Barfi!	Jhilmil Chatterjee		
2013	Girl Rising	Narrator	Documentary	
2013	Planes	Ishani	Voice role	
2013	Bombay Talkies	Herself	Special appearance in the song "Apna Bombay Talkies"	
2013	Shootout at Wadala	Babli Badmaash	Special appearance in the song "Babli Badmaash Hai"	
2013	Deewana Main Deewana	Priya Singh		
2013	Zanjeer / Thoofan	Mala	Bilingual film	
2013	Krrish 3	Priya Mehra		
2013	Goliyon Ki Raasleela Ram-Leela	Herself	Special appearance in the song "Ram Chahe Leela"	
2014	Gunday	Nandita Sengupta		
2014	Mary Kom	Mary Kom		
2015	Dil Dhadakne Do	Ayesha Mehra		
2015	Bajirao Mastani	Kashibai		
2016	Jai Gangaajal	Abha Mathur		
2016	Ventilator	Herself	Cameo appearance	
2017	Baywatch	Victoria Leeds	English film	
2018	A Kid Like Jake	Amal	English film	
2019	Isn't It Romantic	Isabella Stone	English film	
2019	Chasing Happiness	Herself	Documentary	
2019	The Sky Is Pink	Aditi Chaudhary		
2020	We Are One Family	Herself	Short film	
2020	Happiness Continues	Herself	Documentary	
2020	We Can Be Heroes	Ms. Granada	English film	
2021	The White Tiger	Pinky Shah	English film	
2021	The Matrix Resurrections	Sati	English film	
2023	Love Again	Mira Ray		
2024	Tiger	Narrator	Documentary	
2024	An Emperor's Jewel: The Making of the Bulgari Hotel Roma	Herself	Documentary	
2025	Heads of State	Noel Bisset	English film	
2025	A Very Jonas Christmas Movie	Herself	Cameo appearance	
2026	The Bluff	Ercell Bodden / Mariam / "Bloody Mary"	English film	
2027	Varanasi †	Mandakini	Telugu film; Post-production	
2027	Amri †	Madame Azurie	Post-production	
TBA	Judgment Day †	TBA	Post-production	

=== As producer ===
Year	Title	Language	Notes	Ref.
2013	Girl Rising	English		
2016	Bam Bam Bol Raha Hai Kashi	Bhojpuri		
2016	Ventilator	Marathi		
2017	Sarvann	Punjabi		
2018	Kay Re Rascalaa	Marathi		
2018	Pahuna: The Little Visitors	Nepali		
2018	Kaashi Amarnath	Bhojpuri		
2019	Bhoga Khirikee	Assamese		
2019	Firebrand	Marathi		
2019	The Sky Is Pink	Hindi	Co-producer	
2020	Evil Eye	English	Executive producer	
2021	The White Tiger	English	Executive producer	
2024	WOMB: Women Of My Billion	Hindi		
2024	To Kill a Tiger	Hindi	Executive producer	
2024	Born Hungry	English		
2024	Anuja	Hindi	Executive producer	
2024	Paani	Marathi		
2025	The Cycle of Love	English	Executive producer	
2026	The Bluff	English		
2027	Ventilator 2	Marathi		
TBA	Amri †	English	Executive producer	

== Television ==
Key
†	Denotes films that have not yet been released

Year	Title	Role	Language	Notes	Ref.
2010	Fear Factor: Khatron Ke Khiladi	Host	Hindi	Season 3	
2015–2018	Quantico	Alex Parrish	English	Main role	
2016	It's My City	Herself	English	Guest role; also producer	
2019	If I Could Tell You Just One Thing	Host	English	Also producer	
2019	Activate: The Global Citizen Movement	Herself	English	Documentary series	
2020	A World of Calm	Narrator	English	Episode: "The Gift of Chocolate"	
2021	Supersoul	Herself/Guest	English	Talk show	
2021	Jonas Brothers Family Roast	Herself	English	Television special	
2023–present	Citadel	Nadia Sinh	English	Main role	
2026	Hunkkaar	—N/a	Hindi	Executive producer	

== Theatre ==
Year	Title	Role	Language	Notes	Ref.
2021	Chicken & Biscuits	N/A	English	Producer; Broadway	

== Discography ==
As lead artist

Title	Year	Peak chart positions			Certifications	Album
Title	Year	CAN	US Dance Club	US Dance Elec	Certifications	Album
"In My City" (featuring will.i.am)	2012	—	—	—	IMI: 3× Platinum	—N/a
"Exotic" (featuring Pitbull)	2013	74	12	16		—N/a
"I Can't Make You Love Me"	2014	—	—	28		—N/a

As featured artist

Title	Year	Album
"Erase" (The Chainsmokers featuring Priyanka Chopra)	2012	—N/a
"Meltdown" (N.A.S.A. featuring Priyanka Chopra & DMX)	2015	—N/a
"Young and Free" (Will Sparks featuring Priyanka Chopra)	2017	—N/a

Other appearances

Track	Year	Album	Language
"Ullathai Killathe"	2002	Thamizhan	Tamil
"Saajan Saajan"	2005	Barsaat	Hindi
"Chaoro (Lori)"	2014	Mary Kom	Hindi
"Dil Dhadakne Do"	2015	Dil Dhadakne Do	Hindi
"Baba"	2016	Ventilator	Marathi
"Need U" (Conversation with Priyanka Chopra)	2016	Hard II Love	English
"Kiss Me"	2019	Isn't It Romantic	English
"I Wanna Dance With Somebody (Who Loves Me)"	2019	Isn't It Romantic	English
"Express Yourself"	2019	Isn't It Romantic	English
"Heights"	2021	Spaceman; Background vocalist	English
Last Christmas	2025	Christmas Karma	English

== Music videos ==
Year	Title	Artist	Album	Ref.
2000	"Sajan Mere Satrangiya"	Daler Mehndi	Ek Dana	
2010	"Phir Mile Sur Mera Tumhara"	Various	—	
2011	"Mind Blowing"	Ganesh Hegde	Let's Party	
2012	"In My City"	Priyanka Chopra (featuring will.i.am)	—	
2013	"Exotic"	Priyanka Chopra (featuring Pitbull)	—	
2014	"I Can't Make You Love Me"	Priyanka Chopra	—	
2014	"Imagine" (UNICEF: World version)	Various	—	
2016	"Don't You Need Somebody"	RedOne (featuring Enrique Iglesias, R. City, Shaggy and Serayah)	—	
2019	"Sucker"	Jonas Brothers	Happiness Begins	
2020	"What a Man Gotta Do"	Jonas Brothers	—	
2020	"Until We Meet Again"	Nick Jonas	—	
2021	"Spaceman"	Nick Jonas	Spaceman	

== Video games ==
Year	Title	Voice role	Ref.
2016	Marvel Avengers Academy	Kamala Khan / Ms. Marvel	

== See also ==
- Awards and nominations received by Priyanka Chopra
