= Finisher =

Finisher may refer to:

- Finisher (wrestling), a move in professional wrestling
- Asphalt finisher or Paver
- The Finisher (series), also known as Vega Jane, a book series by David Baldacci
  - The Finisher (novel), the first book in the series
- The Finishers, a 2013 French film
- Finisher, a device for post-printing actions (stapling, hole-punching, folding, or collating) usually as a multi-function printer
- James Faulkner (cricketer), nicknamed "The Finisher" due to his ability to seal victories as a batsman

== See also ==
- Finish (disambiguation)
- Finishing (disambiguation)
