= Unfinished =

Unfinished may refer to:

- Unfinished creative work, a work which a creator either chose not to finish or was prevented from finishing.

== Music ==
- Symphony No. 8 (Schubert) "Unfinished"
- Unfinished (album), 2011 album by American singer Jordan Knight
- "Unfinished" (Kotoko song), stylized "→unfinished→", 2012
- "Unfinished" (Mandisa song), 2017
- "Unfinished", song by Stone Sour from the 2010 album Audio Secrecy
- "Unfinished", song by Mineral from the 1998 album EndSerenading

== Television and film ==
- "Unfinished" (How I Met Your Mother), 2010 television show episode
- Unfinished (film), 2018 South Korean film

== Literature ==
- The Unfinished, a 2003 novel by Reinhard Jirgl
- Unfinished (book), a 2021 memoir by Priyanka Chopra

== See also ==
- Unfinished symphony
- Unfinished building
- Finished (disambiguation)
