= List of awards and nominations received by Priyanka Chopra =

Priyanka Chopra awards and nominations
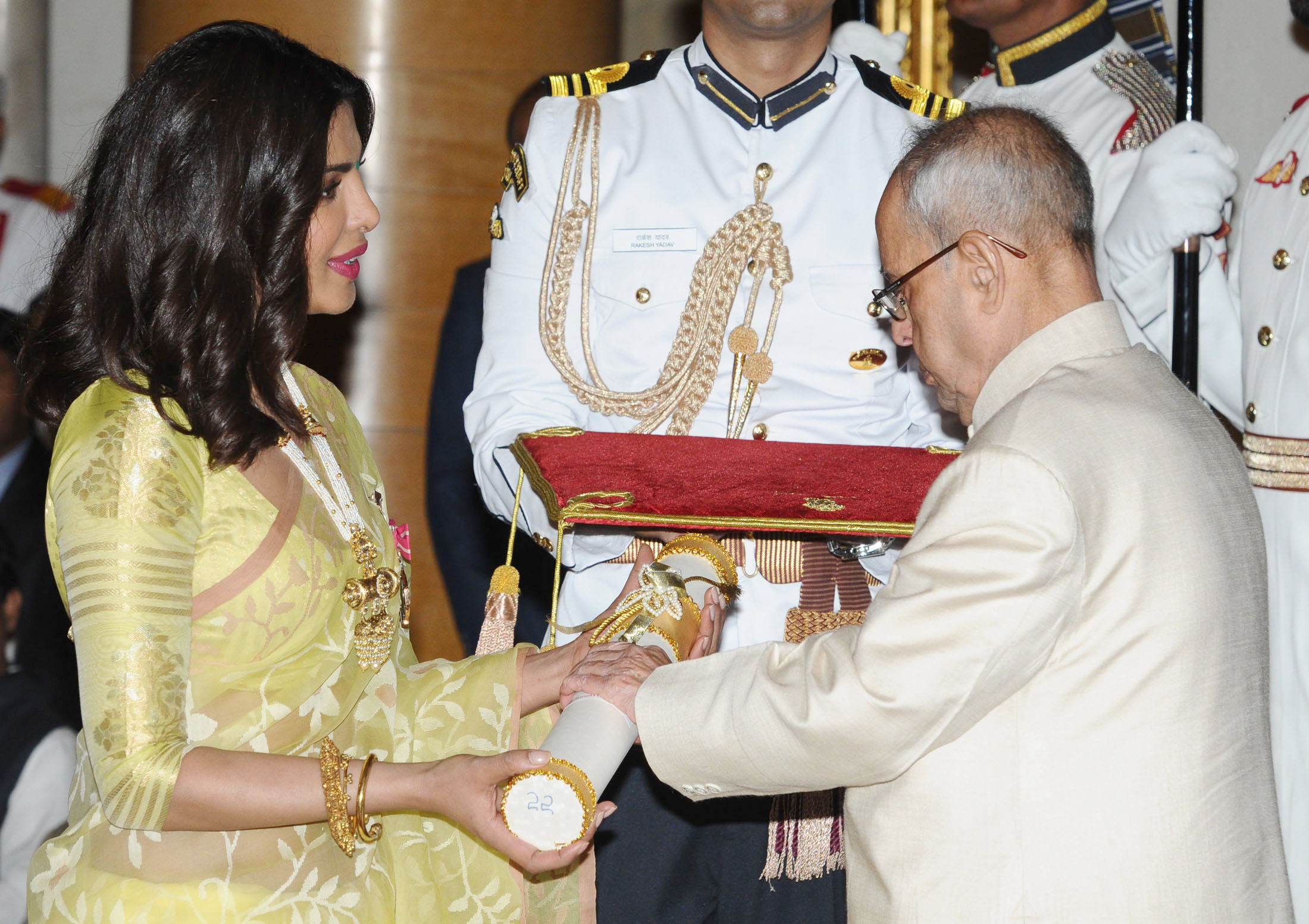
- The president of India, Pranab Mukherjee, presenting the Padma Shri award to Chopra in 2016
Awards and nominations
Award	Wins	Nominations

Totals (Note: Certain award groups do not simply award one winner. They acknowledge several different recipients, have runners-up, and have third place. Since this is a specific recognition and is different from losing an award, runner-up mentions are considered wins in this award tally. For simplification and to avoid errors, each award in this list has been presumed to have had a prior nomination.)
- Wins: 92
- Nominations: 138

Priyanka Chopra is an Indian actress who has received several awards and nominations including two National Film Award, five Filmfare Awards, eight Producers Guild Film Awards, eight Screen Awards, six IIFA Awards, and two People's Choice Awards. In 2000, she participated in the Femina Miss India contest, where she finished second, winning the Femina Miss India World title. (Note: At the time, the second place contestant of Femina Miss India was given the title "Miss India World" and sent to the Miss World competition, whereas the first place contestant was sent to Miss Universe, and third place to Miss Asia Pacific International.) She then entered the Miss World pageant and was crowned Miss World 2000, becoming the fifth Indian to win the contest. Chopra made her Bollywood film debut with a supporting role in the 2003 spy thriller The Hero, which earned her the Stardust Award for Best Supporting Actress. The same year, her performance in the romantic musical Andaaz won her the Filmfare Award for Best Female Debut and a nomination for Best Supporting Actress at the same ceremony. For her portrayal of a seductress in the romantic thriller Aitraaz, Chopra won the Filmfare Award for Best Performance in a Negative Role and received her second nomination for Best Supporting Actress. The same year, she was nominated for the IIFA Award for Best Actress for the romantic comedy Mujhse Shaadi Karogi.

Chopra starred as a troubled model in the drama Fashion (2008), for which she won many Best Actress awards in India including the National Film Award for Best Actress and the Filmfare Award in the same category. In 2010, she received several Best Actress nominations for playing a feisty Marathi woman in the caper thriller Kaminey, winning her second consecutive Producers Guild Film Award for Best Actress in a Leading Role after Fashion. The same year, she was nominated for the Screen Award for Best Actress for playing twelve distinct roles in the social comedy film What's Your Raashee?. For her portrayal of a serial killer, in the 2011 neo-noir 7 Khoon Maaf, she won the Filmfare Award for Best Actress (Critics), in addition to a Best Actress nomination at the same ceremony.

She played the role of an autistic woman in the 2012 romantic drama Barfi!, for which she won the Zee Cine Award for Best Actress and was nominated under the Best Actress category at the Filmfare, Screen, Producers Guild and IIFA awards. In 2014, Chopra's performance as Mary Kom in the eponymous biographical sports drama won her a second Screen and a third Producers Guild Film Award for Best Actress. For her debut single "In My City" (2012), she earned three nominations at the World Music Awards. She received several Best Actress nominations for her performance in the 2015 ensemble family comedy-drama Dil Dhadakne Do, winning the Screen Award for Best Ensemble Cast. The same year, she won the Filmfare Award for Best Supporting Actress, among other accolades, for portraying Kashibai in the historical romantic drama Bajirao Mastani.

In 2016, Chopra received the People's Choice Award for Favourite Actress In A New TV Series for her role in Quantico, becoming the first South Asian actress to win a People's Choice Award. The same year, she was awarded the Padma Shri, the fourth highest civilian award, by the Government of India. In 2017, she won her second People's Choice Award for Favorite Dramatic TV Actress for Quantico. Chopra received the Mother Teresa Memorial Award for Social Justice in 2016 and the Danny Kaye Humanitarian Award from UNICEF in 2019 for her philanthropic work. For playing a protective mother in the biographical drama The Sky Is Pink (2019), she received several nominations, including the Filmfare Award for Best Actress.

== Asian Film Awards ==
The Asian Film Awards are presented annually by the Hong Kong International Film Festival Society to members of Asian cinema. Chopra has received one award.

Year	Nominated artist	Category	Result	Ref.
2009	Priyanka Chopra	Outstanding Contribution to Asian Cinema	Won	

== Bengal Film Journalists' Association Awards ==
The Bengal Film Journalists' Association Awards are presented by the oldest association of film critics in India, founded in 1937. Chopra has received one award.

Year	Nominated work	Category	Result	Ref.
2005	Aitraaz	Best Actress (Hindi)	Won	

== BIG Star Entertainment Awards ==
The BIG Star Entertainment Awards is an annual event organised by the Reliance Broadcast Network. Chopra has won four awards from ten nominations.

Year	Nominated artist and work	Category	Result	Ref.
2010	Priyanka Chopra	New Talent of the Decade – Female	Won	
2011	7 Khoon Maaf	Most Entertaining Film Actor – Female	Nominated	
2012	Don 2	Most Entertaining Actor in an Action Film – Female	Nominated	
2012	Barfi!	Most Entertaining Film Actor – Female	Won	
2012	Barfi!	Most Entertaining Actor in a Romantic Film – Female	Nominated	
2013	Goliyon Ki Rasleela Ram-Leela	Most Entertaining Dancer – Male & Female (for song "Ram Chahe Leela")	Nominated	
2014	Mary Kom	Most Entertaining Actor in a Social/Drama Film – Female	Won	
2014	Mary Kom	Most Entertaining Film Actor – Female	Won	
2015	Dil Dhadakne Do	Most Entertaining Actor in a Drama Film – Female	Nominated	
2015	Dil Dhadakne Do	Most Entertaining Singer – Female (for song "Dil Dhadakne Do")	Nominated	

== Civilian Awards ==
The Civilian Awards are presented by the Government of India to citizens of India recognising their contributions to various fields such as Arts, Education, Industry, Literature, Science, Sports, Medicine, Social Service and Public Affairs. Chopra was awarded the Padma Shri, the fourth highest civilian honour in India.

Year	Nominated work	Category	Result	Ref.
2016	Priyanka Chopra	Padma Shri	Won	

== Critics' Choice Super Awards ==
Year	Nominated work	Category	Result	Ref.
2024	Citadel	Best Actress in an Action Series, Limited Series or Made-for-TV Movie	Nominated	
2026	The Bluff	Best Actress in an Action Movie	Pending	

== Filmfare Awards ==
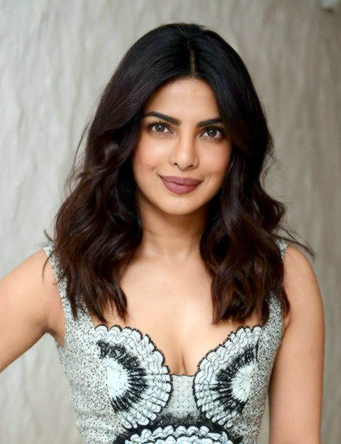
Chopra in 2016

The Filmfare Awards are presented annually by The Times Group for excellence of cinematic achievements in Hindi cinema. Chopra has won five awards in five categories from twelve nominations.

Year	Nominated work	Category	Result	Ref.
2004	Andaaz	Best Female Debut	Won (Note: Tied with Lara Dutta for the same film.)	
2004	Andaaz	Best Supporting Actress	Nominated	
2005	Aitraaz	Best Supporting Actress	Nominated	
2005	Aitraaz	Best Performance in a Negative Role	Won	
2009	Fashion	Best Actress	Won	
2010	Kaminey	Best Actress	Nominated	
2012	7 Khoon Maaf	Best Actress	Nominated	
2012	7 Khoon Maaf	Best Actress (Critics)	Won	
2013	Barfi!	Best Actress	Nominated	
2015	Mary Kom	Best Actress	Nominated	
2016	Bajirao Mastani	Best Supporting Actress	Won	
2020	The Sky Is Pink	Best Actress	Nominated	

== Filmfare Marathi Awards ==
The Filmfare Marathi Awards are presented annually by The Times Group for excellence of cinematic achievements in Marathi cinema.

Year	Nominated work	Category	Result	Ref.
2017	Ventilator	Best Film	Nominated	
2025	Paani	Best Film	Won	

== FOI Online Awards ==
FOI Online Awards is an annual online poll, researched, organised and voted by a team of film enthusiasts, honouring the artists for their artworks in Hindi cinema.

Year	Nominated work	Category	Result	Ref.
2016	Bajirao Mastani	Best Actress in a Leading Role	Nominated	
2020	The Sky Is Pink	Best Actress in a Leading Role	Nominated	

== Global Indian Film Awards ==
The Global Indian Film Awards was an awards ceremony organised by Popcorn Entertainment for the Hindi cinema. Chopra has won two awards.

Year	Nominated work and artist	Category	Result	Ref.
2005	Aitraaz	Best Villain - Female	Won	
2007	Priyanka Chopra	Most Searched Female Actor on Internet	Won	

== Indian Telly Awards ==
The Indian Telly Awards are presented annually by indiantelevision.com to honour excellence in the television industry. Chopra has received one award.

Year	Nominated work	Category	Result	Ref.
2010	Fear Factor: Khatron Ke Khiladi X 3	Most Impactful Debut on Television	Won	

== International Indian Film Academy Awards ==
The International Indian Film Academy Awards (shortened as IIFA) is annual international event organised by the Wizcraft International Entertainment Pvt. Ltd. to honour excellence in the Hindi cinema. Chopra has won six awards from twelve nominations.

Year	Nominated work	Category	Result	Ref.
2005	Mujhse Shaadi Karogi	Best Actress	Nominated	
2007	Krrish	Best On-Screen Beauty	Won	
2009	Fashion	Best Actress	Won	
2010	Kaminey	Best Actress	Nominated	
2011	Priyanka Chopra	Green Globe Award for Contribution to a Greener Earth	Won	
2012	7 Khoon Maaf	Best Actress	Nominated	
2013	Barfi!	Best Actress	Nominated	
2014	Priyanka Chopra	Woman of Substance	Won	
2015	Mary Kom	Best Actress	Nominated	
2016	Dil Dhadakne Do	Best Actress	Nominated	
2016	Bajirao Mastani	Best Supporting Actress	Won	
2016	Priyanka Chopra	Woman of the Year	Won	
2020	The Sky Is Pink	Best Actress	Nominated	

== Lions Gold Awards ==
The Lions Gold Awards are presented annually by members of the Lions Club of SOL — Mumbai to honour excellence in the Hindi cinema. Chopra has won six awards.

Year	Nominated work	Category	Result	Ref.
2009	Fashion	Favourite Actor in a Leading Role – Female	Won	
2011	Anjaana Anjaani	Favourite Popular Film Actor – Female	Won	
2012	Don 2	Favourite Actor in a Leading Role – Female	Won	
2013	Barfi!	Favourite Actor in a Leading Role – Female	Won	
2015	Mary Kom	Favourite Actor in a Leading Role – Female	Won	
2017	Ventilator	Favourite Marathi Film	Won	

== Maharashtra State Film Awards ==
The Maharashtra State Film Awards are presented annually by the Government of Maharashtra for excellence of cinematic achievements in Marathi cinema.

Year	Nominated work	Category	Result	Ref.
2017	Ventilator	Best Film	Won	

== Mirchi Music Awards ==
The Mirchi Music Awards are presented annually by Radio Mirchi to honour excellence in the Hindi language film music industry. Chopra has received two nominations.

Year	Nominated work	Category	Result	Ref.
2013	"In My City"	Indipop Song of the Year	Nominated	
2014	"Exotic"	Indipop Song of the Year	Nominated	

== Mirchi Music Awards Marathi ==
The Mirchi Music Awards Marathi are presented annually by Radio Mirchi to honour excellence in the Marathi language film music industry.

Year	Nominated work	Category	Result	Ref.
2017	"Baba"	Listeners' Choice Song of the Year	Won	

== Mother Teresa Awards ==
The Mother Teresa Awards are presented annually by the Harmony Foundation to honour social work.

Year	Nominated artist	Category	Result	Ref.
2017	Priyanka Chopra	Mother Teresa Memorial Award for Social Justice	Won	

== MTV Europe Music Awards ==
The MTV Europe Music Awards was established in 1994 by MTV Europe to award the music videos from European and international artists. Chopra has won one award from two nominations.

Year	Nominated work	Category	Result	Ref.
2015	Priyanka Chopra	Best Indian Act	Won	
2015	Priyanka Chopra	Worldwide Act: Africa / India	Nominated	

== National Film Awards ==
The National Film Awards is the most prestigious film award ceremony in India. Established in 1954, it is administered by the International Film Festival of India and the Indian government's Directorate of Film Festivals. The awards are presented by the President of India. Due to their national scale, they are considered to be the equivalent of the Academy Awards. Chopra has received two awards, first for Fashion as an actress and second for Paani as a producer.

Year	Nominated work	Category	Result	Ref.
2008	Fashion	Best Actress	Won	
2019	Paani	Best Film on Environment Conservation/Preservation	Won	

== Nickelodeon Kids' Choice Awards India ==
The Nickelodeon Kids' Choice Awards India is the Indian version of the American awards show recognising Indian Film, TV, Music and Sports. Chopra has received one award.

Year	Nominated work	Category	Result	Ref.
2013	Barfi!	Best Movie Actress	Won	
2015	Mary Kom	Best Movie Actress	Nominated	
2016	Bajirao Mastani	Best Movie Actress	Nominated	

== People's Choice Awards ==
The People's Choice Awards is an annual awards show recognising the people and the work of popular culture, voted by the general public. Chopra has won two awards. She is the first South Asian actress to win a People's Choice Award.

Year	Nominated work	Category	Result	Ref.
2016	Quantico	Favorite Actress In A New TV Series	Won	
2017	Quantico	Favorite Dramatic TV Actress	Won	

== People's Choice Awards India ==
The People's Choice Awards India is the Indian version of the American awards show recognising Indian film, television, music and sports. Chopra has received one award.

Year	Nominated work	Category	Result	Ref.
2012	Agneepath	Favourite Ensemble Cast	Nominated	
2012	"In My City"	Favourite International Music Debut	Won	

== Producers Guild Film Awards ==
The Producers Guild Film Awards (previously known as Apsara Film & Television Producers Guild Awards) is an annual event organised by the Film Producers Guild of India. Chopra has won eight awards from thirteen nominations.

Year	Nominated work	Category	Result	Ref.
2006	Aitraaz	Best Actress in a Supporting Role	Nominated	
2009	Fashion	Best Actress in a Leading Role	Won	
2010	Kaminey	Best Actress in a Leading Role	Won	
2012	7 Khoon Maaf	Best Actress in a Leading Role	Nominated	
2012	7 Khoon Maaf and Don 2	Entertainer of the Year	Won	
2013	Agneepath and Barfi!	Star of the Year - Female	Won	
2013	Barfi!	Best Actress in a Leading Role	Nominated	
2015	Mary Kom	Best Actress in a Leading Role	Won	
2015	Mary Kom	Dialogue of the Year	Won	
2015	Priyanka Chopra	Hindustan Times Celebrity for a Cause	Won	
2016	Dil Dhadakne Do	Best Actress in a Leading Role	Nominated	
2016	Bajirao Mastani	Best Actress in a Leading Role	Nominated	
2016	Priyanka Chopra	Guild Global Honor	Won	

== Screen Awards ==
The Screen Awards are annually presented by the Indian Express Limited to honour excellence of cinematic achievements in Hindi and Marathi cinema. Chopra has won eight awards from twenty seven nominations.

Year	Nominated work	Category	Result	Ref.
2004	Andaaz	Most Promising Newcomer – Female	Nominated	
2005	Aitraaz	Best Actor in a Negative Role	Won	
2005	Aitraaz	Jodi No. 1 (along with Akshay Kumar)	Nominated	
2009	Fashion	Best Actress	Won	
2009	Fashion	Best Actress (Popular Choice)	Nominated	
2010	Kaminey	Best Actress (Popular Choice)	Nominated	
2010	Kaminey	Best Actress	Nominated	
2010	Kaminey	Jodi No. 1 (along with Shahid Kapoor)	Nominated	
2010	What's Your Raashee?	Best Actress	Nominated	
2010	What's Your Raashee?	Best Actress (Popular Choice)	Nominated	
2011	Anjaana Anjaani	Best Actress (Popular Choice)	Nominated	
2012	7 Khoon Maaf	Best Actress	Nominated	
2012	7 Khoon Maaf	Best Actor in a Negative Role – Female	Won	
2012	Don 2	Best Actress (Popular Choice)	Nominated	
2012	Don 2	Jodi No. 1 (along with Shahrukh Khan)	Won	
2013	Barfi!	Best Actress	Nominated	
2013	Barfi!	Jodi No. 1 (along with Ranbir Kapoor)	Won	
2013	Barfi!	Best Actress (Popular Choice)	Nominated	
2014	Krrish 3	Best Actress (Popular Choice)	Nominated	
2015	Mary Kom	Best Actress (Popular Choice)	Nominated	
2015	Mary Kom	Best Actress	Won	
2016	Dil Dhadakne Do	Best Actress	Nominated	
2016	Dil Dhadakne Do	Best Ensemble Cast	Won	
2016	Dil Dhadakne Do and Bajirao Mastani	Best Actress (Popular Choice)	Nominated	
2016	Bajirao Mastani	Best Supporting Actress	Won	
2019	The Sky Is Pink	Best Film (Critics)	Nominated	
2019	The Sky Is Pink	Best Actress (Critics)	Nominated	

== Shanghai International Film Festival ==
The Shanghai International Film Festival is one of the largest film festivals in East Asia. Chopra has received one award.

Year	Nominated work	Category	Result	Ref.
2009	Priyanka Chopra	"Golden Goblet" (Jin Jue) Award for Contribution to Cinema	Won	

== Stardust Awards ==
The Stardust Awards are an annual event organised by Magna Publishing Company Limited to honour excellence in the Hindi cinema. Chopra has won seven awards from fifteen nominations.

Year	Nominated work	Category	Result	Ref.
2004	The Hero: Love Story of a Spy	Best Supporting Actress	Won	
2005	Mujhse Shaadi Karogi	Superstar of Tomorrow – Female	Won	
2006	Waqt: The Race Against Time	Superstar of Tomorrow – Female	Nominated	
2009	Fashion and Dostana	Star of the Year – Female	Won	
2010	Kaminey	Star of the Year – Female	Nominated	
2012	7 Khoon Maaf and Don 2	Star of the Year – Female	Nominated	
2012	Don 2	Best Actress – Thriller/Action	Nominated	
2012	7 Khoon Maaf	Best Actress – Drama	Nominated	
2013	Barfi!	Best Actress – Drama	Won (Note: Tied with Sridevi for English Vinglish.)	
2013	Barfi!	Star of the Year – Female	Won	
2014	Gunday	Best Actress – Thriller/Action	Nominated	
2014	Mary Kom	Star of the Year – Female	Nominated	
2014	Mary Kom	Best Actress – Drama	Won	
2015	Dil Dhadakne Do	Actor of the Year – Female	Nominated	
2017	Priyanka Chopra	Global Icon of the Year	Won	

== Teen Choice Awards ==
The Teen Choice Awards is an annual awards show that airs on the Fox Network. The awards honor the year's biggest achievements in music, movies, sports, television, fashion and other categories, voted by teen viewers.

Year	Nominated work	Category	Result	Ref.
2016	Quantico	Choice TV: Breakout Star	Nominated	
2017	Baywatch	Choice Movie: Villain	Nominated	

== Times of India Film Awards ==
The Times of India Film Awards (shortened as TOIFA) is an international event organised by The Times Group to reward excellence in Hindi cinema. Chopra has received two awards.

Year	Nominated work	Category	Result	Ref.
2013	Barfi!	Best Actress	Won	
2016	Bajirao Mastani	Best Supporting Actress	Won	

== World Music Awards ==
The World Music Awards is an international awards ceremony founded in 1989 that annually honours recording artists based on worldwide sales figures provided by the International Federation of the Phonographic Industry (IFPI). Chopra has received three nominations.

Year	Nominated work	Category	Result	Ref.
2012	Priyanka Chopra	World's Best Female Artist	Nominated	
2012	"In My City"	World's Best Song	Nominated	
2012	"In My City"	World's Best Video	Nominated	

== Zee Cine Awards ==
The Zee Cine Awards are an annual award ceremony organised by the Zee Entertainment Enterprises. Chopra has won two awards from ten nominations.

Year	Nominated work	Category	Result	Ref.
2004	The Hero: Love Story of a Spy and Andaaz	Best Female Debut	Nominated	
2005	Aitraaz	Best Actor in a Negative Role	Nominated	
2011	Priyanka Chopra	International Female Icon	Nominated	
2012	7 Khoon Maaf	Best Actor – Female	Nominated	
2013	Barfi!	Best Actor – Female	Won	
2014	Priyanka Chopra	International Female Icon	Won	
2016	Dil Dhadakne Do	Best Actor – Female	Nominated	
2016	Bajirao Mastani	Best Actor – Female	Nominated	
2016	Bajirao Mastani	Best Actor – Female (Critics)	Nominated	
2017	Priyanka Chopra	Global Icon Extraordinaire	Won	

== Zee Gaurav Puraskar ==
The Zee Gaurav Puraskar are presented annually by Zee Network for excellence of cinematic achievements in Marathi cinema.

Year	Nominated work	Category	Result	Ref.
2017	Ventilator	Best Film	Nominated	

== Other awards ==
Year	Nominated work and artist	Award	Category	Result	Ref.
2009	Priyanka Chopra	FICCI Frames Excellence Honours	Most Powerful Entertainer of the Decade	Won	
2010	Priyanka Chopra	NDTV Indian of the Year Awards	Female Entertainer of the Year	Won	
2016	Priyanka Chopra	Shorty Awards	Best Actress in Social Media	Nominated	
2016	Priyanka Chopra	CNN-IBN Indian of the Year	Indian of the Year (Entertainment)	Nominated	
2019	Bhoga Khirikee	Indian Film Festival of Melbourne	Best Indie Film	Nominated	
2019	Priyanka Chopra	UNICEF Danny Kaye Humanitarian Award	—	Won	
2022	Book- Unfinished	Golden Book Awards	Best Book	Won	
2026	Priyanka Chopra	Gold Gala	Global Vanguard Honor	Won	

== Pageants ==
Year	Recipient	Honour	Result	Ref.
2000	Priyanka Chopra	Femina Miss India	Won	
2000	Priyanka Chopra	Miss World	Won	
2000	Priyanka Chopra	Miss World Continental Queen of Beauty − Asia & Oceania	Won	
