= Finished =

Finished may refer to:

- Finished (novel), a 1917 novel by H. Rider Haggard
- Finished (film), a 1923 British silent romance film
- "Finished" (short story), a science fiction short story by L. Sprague de Camp
- Finished "Manchester United"

== See also ==
- Finishing (disambiguation)
- Finish (disambiguation)
