= An Emperor's Jewel: The Making of the Bulgari Hotel Roma =

Amazon Prime documentary with Priyanka Chopra on Bulgari's new Hotel in Rome

- Directed by: Andrea Rovetta
- Written by: Andrea Rovetta
- Produced by: Gianluigi Attorre; Caterina Mollica
- Starring: Priyanka Chopra Jonas
- Production company: Atomic Production
- Distributed by: Amazon Prime
- Release date: 7 June 2024
- Country: Italy
- Language: Italian

An Emperor's Jewel: The Making of the Bulgari Hotel Roma is a 2024 documentary written and directed by Andrea Rovetta with the participation of actress Priyanka Chopra Jonas.

== Plot ==
The documentary is the behind the scenes of the birth of the Bulgari luxury hotel in Piazza Augusto Imperatore in Rome and tells the story of how the hotel has evolved from a 1930s government building designed by Benito Mussolini to the five-star hotel it is today, thanks to the Italian craftsmanship involved

== Release ==
The documentary was released on June 7, 2024 on Amazon Prime Video after a premiering in Ara Pacis museum in Rome, in Los Angeles and at Morgan Library in New York.
