= Unfinished (Kotoko song) =

2012 single by Kotoko

"→unfinished→"

Single by Kotoko

from the album Kūchū Puzzle
- B-side: "Sakura no Ame mo Egi no yo"
- Released: May 16, 2012
- Recorded: 2012
- Genre: J-pop
- Length: 19:34
- Label: Warner Home Video
- Songwriters: Kotoko, Satoshi Yaginuma

Kotoko singles chronology
"Light My Fire" (2011)	"→unfinished→" (2012)	"Restart" (2012)

"→unfinished→" is the 18th single released by the Japanese-pop singer Kotoko. The title track, composed by Satoshi Yaginuma of fripSide, was used as the ending theme song for the anime, Accel World. It was released under Warner Music Japan.

→unfinished→ spent 9 weeks in the Japanese singles chart, peaking at number 14.

== Track listing ==
No.	Title	Writer(s)	Arrangement	Length
1.	"→unfinished→"	Kotoko	Satoshi Yaginuma (fripSide)	4:42
2.	"Sakura no Ame mo Egi no yo"	Kotoko	Shinya Saito	5:06
3.	"→unfinished→ -instrumental-"			4:41
4.	"Sakura no Ame mo Egi no yo -instrumental-"			5:05
