= Priyanka Chopra =

Indian actress and film producer (born 1982)

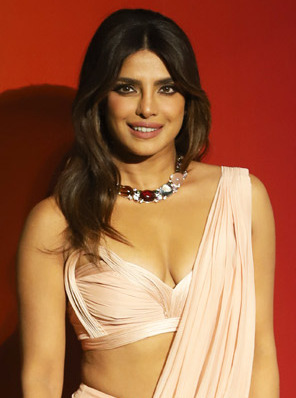
- Chopra in 2024
- Born: 18 July 1982 (age 44); Jamshedpur, Bihar, India
- Occupations: Actress; film producer; singer
- Years active: 2002–present
- Works: Full list
- Title: Miss World 2000
- Spouse: Nick Jonas (m. 2018)
- Children: 1
- Relatives: Chopra family
- Awards: Full list
- Honours: Padma Shri (2016)

Priyanka Chopra Jonas (née Chopra; born 18 July 1982) is an Indian actress, film producer and singer. The winner of the Miss World 2000 pageant, she is India's highest-paid actress and her accolades include two National Film Awards and five Filmfare Awards. In 2016, the Government of India honoured her with the Padma Shri, and Time named her one of the 100 most influential people in the world. Forbes listed her among the World's 100 Most Powerful Women, and in 2022, she was named in the BBC 100 Women list.

Chopra accepted offers to join the Indian film industry following her pageant wins. Her acting debut came in the Tamil film Thamizhan (2002), followed by her Bollywood debut in The Hero: Love Story of a Spy (2003). She played the leading lady in the box-office hits Andaaz (2003) and Mujhse Shaadi Karogi (2004) and had her breakout role in the 2004 romantic thriller Aitraaz. Chopra established herself with starring roles in the top-grossing productions Krrish and Don (both 2006), and later reprised her role in their successful sequels Krrish 3 (2013) and Don 2 (2011). For playing a troubled model in the drama Fashion (2008), Chopra won a National Film Award and a Filmfare Award for Best Actress. Chopra gained further praise for portraying a range of characters in the films Dostana (2008), Kaminey (2009), 7 Khoon Maaf (2011), Barfi! (2012), Mary Kom (2014), Dil Dhadakne Do (2015), and Bajirao Mastani (2015).

From 2015 to 2018, Chopra starred as Alex Parrish in the ABC thriller series Quantico, becoming the first South Asian to headline an American network drama series. Founding the production company Purple Pebble Pictures in 2015, she produced several films under it, including the Marathi films Ventilator (2016) and Paani (2019), and the self-starring Hindi biopic The Sky Is Pink (2019). Chopra has also appeared in Hollywood films, such as Baywatch (2017), Isn't It Romantic (2019), The White Tiger (2021), and The Matrix Resurrections (2021), and starred in the action thriller series Citadel (2023–present).

Chopra ventured into music by releasing three singles and into writing with her memoir Unfinished (2021), which reached The New York Times Best Seller list. Her other ventures include tech investments, a haircare brand, a restaurant, and a homeware line. She promotes social causes such as environment and women's rights and is vocal about gender equality, the gender pay gap, and feminism. She has worked with UNICEF since 2006 and was appointed as the national and global UNICEF Goodwill Ambassador for child rights in 2010 and 2016, respectively. Her namesake foundation for health and education works towards providing support to underprivileged Indian children. Chopra has walked the Met Gala red carpet in Manhattan five times as of 2025. Despite maintaining privacy, Chopra's off-screen life, including her marriage to American singer and actor Nick Jonas, is the subject of substantial media coverage.

== Early life and career ==
Chopra was born on 18 July 1982 in Jamshedpur, Bihar (present-day Jharkhand), to Ashok and Madhu Chopra, both physicians in the Indian Army. Her father was a Punjabi Hindu from Ambala. Her mother is a Bhojpuriya Hindu from Jharkhand and is the eldest daughter of Dr. Manohar Kishan Akhouri, a former Congress veteran, and Madhu Jyotsna Akhouri, a former member of Bihar Legislative Assembly. Chopra's maternal grandmother, Mrs. Akhouri, was a Malayali Jacobite Syrian Christian originally named Mary John, from Kumarakom, Kerala. Chopra has a brother, Siddharth, who is seven years younger. Film actresses Parineeti Chopra, Meera Chopra and Mannara Chopra are her cousins and Neelam Upadhyaya is her sister-in-law.

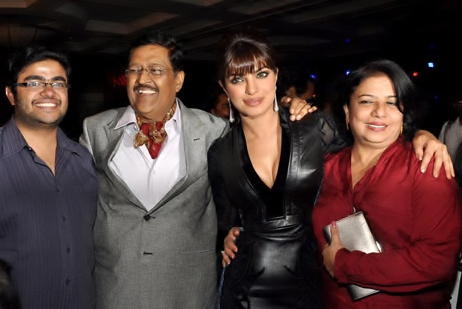
Chopra with her parents and brother in 2012

Owing to Chopra's parents' professions as military physicians, the family was posted in a number of places in India, including Delhi, Chandigarh, Ambala, Ladakh, Lucknow, Bareilly, and Pune. Among the schools she attended were La Martiniere Girls' School in Lucknow and St. Maria Goretti College in Bareilly. In an interview published in Daily News and Analysis, Chopra said that she did not mind travelling regularly and changing schools; she welcomed it as a new experience and a way to discover India's multicultural society. Among the many places that she lived, Chopra has fond memories as a child of playing in the valleys of Leh, in the cold northwestern Indian desert region of Ladakh. She had said: "I think I was in Class 4 when I was in Leh. My brother was just born. My dad was in the army and was posted there. I stayed in Leh for a year, and my memories of that place are tremendous. We were all army kids there. We weren't living in houses, we were in bunkers in the valley and there was a stupa right on top of a hill which used to overlook our valley. We used to race up to the top of the stupa". She now considers Bareilly her home town, and maintains strong connections there.

At 13, Chopra moved to the United States to study, living with her aunt, and attending schools in Newton, Massachusetts, and Cedar Rapids, Iowa, after a stop in Queens, New York, as her aunt's family also moved frequently. While in Massachusetts, she participated in several theatre productions, and studied Western classical music, and choral singing. During her teenage years in the United States, Chopra sometimes faced racial issues and was bullied for being Indian by an African-American classmate. She has said: "I was a gawky kid, had low self-esteem, came from a modest middle-class background, had white marks on my legs. But I was damn hard working. Today, my legs sell 12 brands." After three years, Chopra returned to India, finishing the senior year of her high-school education at the Army Public School in Bareilly.

During this period, Chopra won the local May Queen beauty pageant, after which she was pursued by admirers; her family equipped their home with bars for her protection. Her mother entered her in the Femina Miss India contest of 2000; she finished second, (Note: At the time, the first runner-up of Femina Miss India was given the title "Miss India World" and sent to the Miss World competition, whereas the winner was sent to Miss Universe, and the second runner-up competed at Miss Asia Pacific International.) winning the Femina Miss India World title. Chopra next won the Miss World pageant, where she was crowned Miss World 2000 and Miss World Continental Queen of Beauty—Asia & Oceania at the Millennium Dome in London on 30 November 2000. Chopra was the fifth Indian contestant to win Miss World, and the fourth to do so within seven years, she also reigned along with Miss Universe 2000 titleholder, Lara Dutta also from India. She had enrolled in college, but left after winning the Miss World pageant. Chopra said that the Miss India and Miss World titles brought her recognition, and she began receiving offers for film roles. In 2001, the bridge of Chopra's nose collapsed during nasal surgery to remove a polyp. She fell into depression over her "completely different" appearance, but was satisfied with the results of corrective surgeries. She eventually crowned Agbani Darego in Miss World 2001 held in South Africa on 16 November 2001.

== Acting career ==
=== Career beginnings and breakthrough (2002–2004) ===
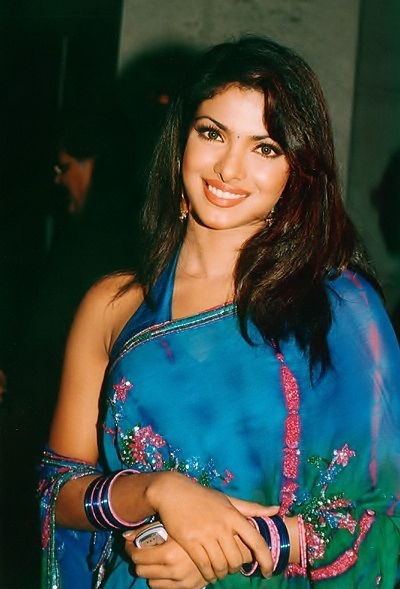
Chopra at a celebration party of Andaaz in 2003

After winning Miss India World, Chopra was cast as the female lead in Abbas–Mustan's romantic thriller Humraaz (2002), in which she was to make her film debut. However, this fell through for various reasons: she stated the production conflicted with her schedule, while the producers said they recast because Chopra took on various other commitments. Her screen debut occurred in the 2002 Tamil film Thamizhan as the love interest of the protagonist, played by Vijay. A review published in The Hindu was appreciative of the film for its wit and dialogue; however it felt that Chopra's role was limited from an acting viewpoint.

In 2003, Chopra made her Bollywood film debut as the second female lead opposite Sunny Deol and Preity Zinta in Anil Sharma's The Hero: Love Story of a Spy. Set against the backdrop of the Indian Army in Kashmir, the film tells the story of an RAW agent's fight against terrorism. She later recounted her experience, admitting she was very nervous and "shaking" when she first met Deol. Despite rumors that she was not a good actress and discussions about possibly removing her from the film, Deol recognized her potential and insisted on giving her a chance to prove herself. The Hero emerged as one of the highest-grossing Bollywood films that year, but received mixed reviews from critics. Derek Elley from Variety said that "mega-looker Chopra makes a solid screen debut." Later that year, she appeared in Raj Kanwar's box-office success Andaaz with Akshay Kumar, sharing the female lead with debutante Lara Dutta. Chopra played a vivacious young woman who falls in love with Kumar's character. The Hindustan Times noted the glamour that she brought to the role; Kunal Shah of Sify praised her performance and stated she had "all the qualities to be a star." Her performance earned her the Filmfare Award for Best Female Debut (along with Dutta) and a Best Supporting Actress nomination.

Chopra's first three releases in 2004—Plan, Kismat, and Asambhav—performed poorly at the box office. Chopra was typically cast during this earlier period as a "glamour quotient", in roles that were considered forgettable by film critic Joginder Tuteja. Later that year, she starred with Salman Khan and Akshay Kumar in David Dhawan's romantic comedy Mujhse Shaadi Karogi, which opened to commercial success and emerged the third-highest-grossing film of the year in India.

In late 2004, she starred opposite Kumar and Kareena Kapoor in Abbas–Mustan's romantic thriller Aitraaz. Chopra considers her first role as an antagonist, portraying Soniya Roy, an ambitious woman who accuses her employee of sexual harassment, as the "biggest learning experience of her career". The film was a critical and commercial success, and Chopra's performance received critical acclaim. The Hindustan Times cited it as the film that changed her career significantly. A reviewer writing for the BBC said: "Aitraaz is Chopra's film. As the deliciously wicked, gold digging, scheming seductress, she chews up every scene she is in with her magnetic screen presence." She won a Filmfare Award for Best Performance in a Negative Role, becoming the second and final actress to win the award after Kajol (the category was discontinued in 2008). Chopra also received a nomination for the Filmfare Award for Best Supporting Actress, and the Producers Guild Film Award for Best Actress in a Supporting Role.

=== Rise to prominence (2005–2006) ===
In 2005, Chopra appeared in 6 films. Her first two releases, the action thrillers Blackmail and Karam, were critically and commercially unsuccessful. Shilpa Bharatan-Iyer of Rediff.com considered Blackmail to be a very predictable film and believed that her role as a police commissioner's wife was very limited from an acting point of view. Her performance in Karam was better received, Subhash K. Jha wrote that Chopra "with her poised interpretation of high drama, flies high creating a character whose vulnerability and beauty are endorsed by both the inner and outer worlds created for her character." Later that year, Chopra played the wife of Akshay Kumar in Vipul Amrutlal Shah's family drama Waqt: The Race Against Time, the story of a small businessman (played by Amitabh Bachchan) who, hiding his illness, wants to teach his irresponsible son some lessons before he dies. During production, Chopra revisited Leh, a favourite childhood haunt, for the shooting of the song "Subah Hogi". She suffered an accident during the filming for the song "Do Me A Favour Let's Play Holi" when she electrocuted herself, spending a day recovering in hospital. The film was well received by critics, and was a commercial success.

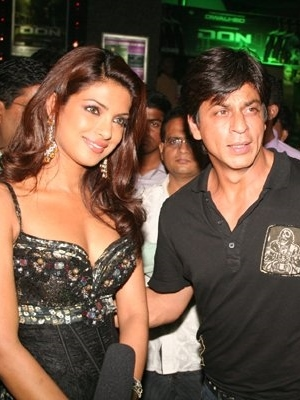
Chopra with co-star Shah Rukh Khan at the premiere of Don (2006)

She next starred opposite Arjun Rampal in the romantic mystery thriller Yakeen, portraying the role of a possessive lover. Critical reaction towards the film was mixed, but her performance received praise. Taran Adarsh wrote that Chopra "is bound to win laurels yet again [...] the actor is emerging as one of the finest talents in these fast-changing times". Her next release was Suneel Darshan's romance Barsaat, co-starring Bobby Deol and Bipasha Basu. The film was a critical and commercial failure in India, but fared better in the overseas market. Chopra's performance received mixed reviews, with Bollywood Hungama describing it as "mechanical". However, Rediff.com considered Chopra to be an "epitome of calm intelligence, who underplayed her role to perfection". Later that year, Rohan Sippy cast her alongside Abhishek Bachchan, Ritesh Deshmukh and Nana Patekar in the comedy Bluffmaster!. Chopra played independent working woman Simran Saxena, Bachchan's love interest. The film proved to be a box-office success.

After starting 2006 with special appearances in three films, Chopra starred in Rakesh Roshan's superhero film Krrish (a sequel to the 2003 science-fiction film Koi... Mil Gaya). Co-starring with Hrithik Roshan, Rekha and Naseeruddin Shah, Chopra played a young television journalist who schemes to take advantage of an innocent young man with remarkable physical abilities, but eventually falls in love with him. The film was the second-highest-grossing film of the year in India and grossed over ₹1.17 billion (US$12 million) worldwide attaining a blockbuster status. Her next film was Dharmesh Darshan's romantic comedy Aap Ki Khatir, co-starring Akshaye Khanna, Ameesha Patel and Dino Morea. Neither the film nor Chopra's performance were well received. Sukanya Verma of Rediff.com stated that Chopra's portrayal of Anu was "erratically sketched" and that her character was never consistent: "first flaky, then cool, and later, sensitive".

Chopra's final release of 2006 was Farhan Akhtar's action-thriller Don (a remake of the 1978 film of the same name), with Shah Rukh Khan. Chopra portrayed Roma (played by Zeenat Aman in the original film), who joins the underworld to avenge Don for killing her brother. Chopra received martial-arts training for her role in the movie, and performed her own stunts. The film was declared a box-office success in India and overseas, with revenues of ₹1.05 billion (US$11 million). Raja Sen of Rediff.com found Chopra to be film's "big surprise"; he believed that Chopra convincingly portrayed Roma, "looking every bit the competent woman of action" and wrote "This is an actress willing to push herself, and has definite potential for screen magic. Not to mention a great smile."

=== Setbacks and resurgence (2007–2008) ===
In 2007, Chopra had two leading roles. Her first film was Nikhil Advani's Salaam-e-Ishq: A Tribute to Love, a romantic comedy-drama in six chapters with an ensemble cast. She was featured opposite Salman Khan in the first chapter as Kamini, an item girl and aspiring actress who tries to land the lead role in a Karan Johar film with a publicity gimmick. Film critic Sukanya Verma praised her flair for comedy, especially her impressions of Meena Kumari, Nargis and Madhubala. Both Salaam-e-Ishq: A Tribute to Love and her next film, Big Brother, proved unsuccessful at the domestic box office.

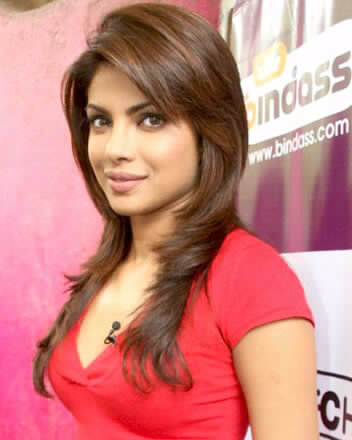
Chopra at an event

In 2008, Chopra starred opposite Harman Baweja in his father's Love Story 2050. Chopra played a double role, so she coloured her hair twice; once red to portray the girl from the future and then black for the girl of the past. Her performance was poorly received; Rajeev Masand was unimpressed with Chopra's chemistry with her co-star, remarking that her character "fails to inspire either affection or sympathy". She next appeared in the comedy God Tussi Great Ho, portraying a TV anchor opposite Salman Khan, Sohail Khan and Amitabh Bachchan. Chopra next starred as a kindergarten teacher in Chamku opposite Bobby Deol and Irrfan Khan, and played the role of Sonia in Goldie Behl's fantasy superhero film Drona opposite Abhishek Bachchan and Jaya Bachchan. Drona, widely criticized for its extensive use of special effects, marked Chopra's sixth film in succession which had failed at both the box-office and critically, although Sukanya Verma of Rediff.com stated that Chopra displayed convincing action heroine skills. Critics generally perceived at this time that her career was over.

The string of poorly received films ended when Chopra starred in Madhur Bhandarkar's Fashion, a drama about the Indian fashion industry which followed the lives and careers of several fashion models. She portrayed the ambitious supermodel Meghna Mathur, a role which she initially thought was out of her depth, but after six months' consideration she accepted the role, inspired by Bhandarkar's confidence in her. For the role, Chopra had to gain 6 kilograms (13 lb) and steadily shed the weight during the production as the character progressed in the film. Both the film and her performance received critical acclaim, proving to be a major turning point in her career. Rajeev Masand felt that she "turns in a respectable performance, one that will inevitably go down as her best." For her performance, she won several awards, including the National Film Award for Best Actress, the Filmfare Award for Best Actress, the IIFA Award for Best Actress, the Screen Award for Best Actress, and the Producers Guild Film Award for Best Actress in a Leading Role. With a worldwide revenue of ₹600 million (US$6 million), Fashion emerged as a commercial success, and was listed by Subhash K. Jha as one of the best films of the decade with women protagonists. It was noted for being commercially successful despite being a women-centric film with no male lead. Chopra said in 2012: "I think actually Fashion kick started ... the process of female dominated films. Today you have so many other films which have done well with female leads."

Chopra's final film of the year was Tarun Mansukhani's romantic comedy Dostana, with Abhishek Bachchan and John Abraham. Set in Miami, the film tells the story of a friendship between her character and two men who pretend to be gay to share an apartment with her. Chopra played a stylish young fashion-magazine editor Neha Melwani, who is trying to deal with professional pressures in her life. Produced by Dharma Productions, the film was a financial success with worldwide revenues of over ₹860 million (US$9 million). Chopra's performance and look in the film were praised. For her performances in both Fashion and Dostana, she jointly won the Stardust Award for Actor of the Year – Female.

=== Experiment with unconventional roles (2009–2011) ===
In 2009, Chopra played a feisty Marathi woman named Sweety in Vishal Bhardwaj's caper thriller Kaminey (co-starring Shahid Kapoor), about twin brothers and the journey in their life linked with the underworld. The film received critical acclaim and became successful at the box-office with the worldwide gross earnings of ₹710 million (US$8 million). Nikhat Kazmi of The Times of India thought that Chopra's role completely reinvented her, and Rajeev Masand wrote: "Springing a delightful surprise in a smaller part is [Chopra], who sprinkles her lines with a smattering of fluent Marathi and emerges one of the film's most lovable characters." Raja Sen of Rediff.com named Chopra's performance as the best by an actress that year. Her role earned her several awards and nominations, including a second consecutive Producers Guild Film Award for Best Actress in a Leading Role after Fashion and Best Actress nominations at the Filmfare, Screen and IIFA awards.

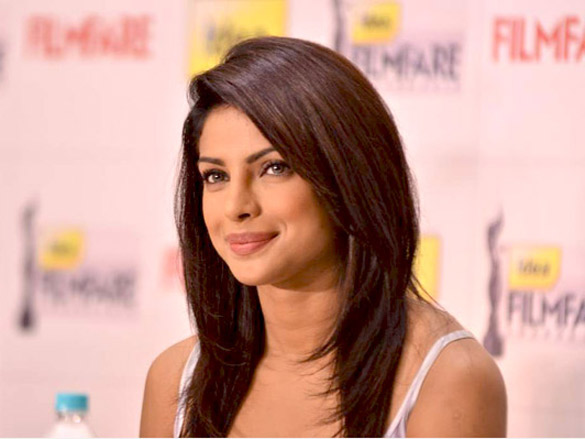
Chopra at a Filmfare Awards press conference in 2011

Chopra subsequently appeared in Ashutosh Gowariker's romantic comedy What's Your Raashee?, based on the novel Kimball Ravenswood by Madhu Rye. The film depicts the story of a US-based Gujrati NRI in search of his soulmate among 12 girls (all played by Chopra) associated with the 12 zodiac signs. She received a nomination for the Screen Award for Best Actress for her performance in the film. She was considered for inclusion in the Guinness World Records book for being the first film actress to portray 12 distinct characters in one film. Chopra's heavy workload—filming for several productions, travelling for endorsements and performing at live shows (including the Miss India pageant)—took its toll; she fainted during filming, and was admitted to hospital. In 2010, Chopra starred with Uday Chopra in Jugal Hansraj's romantic comedy Pyaar Impossible! as Alisha, a popular college girl (and later a working mother) who falls in love with a socially inept man. Later that year, she starred with Ranbir Kapoor in Siddharth Anand's romantic comedy-drama Anjaana Anjaani. Set in New York and Las Vegas, the film follows the story of two suicidal strangers who fall in love with each other. The film received mixed-to-positive reviews from critics and was a commercial success at the box office.

She starred as a femme fatale in her first film of 2011, Vishal Bhardwaj's black comedy 7 Khoon Maaf. Based on the short story Susanna's Seven Husbands by Ruskin Bond, 7 Khoon Maaf centers on Chopra's Susanna Anna-Marie Johannes, an Anglo-Indian woman who murders her husbands in an unending quest for love. The film and her performance received acclaim from critics. Nikhat Kazmi labelled the film "a milestone in Chopra's career graph", complimenting her "exquisite command over a complex character that is definitely a first in Indian cinema". Rachel Saltz of New York Times felt that Susanna was more conceit than a character and that Chopra "though charming as always, can't make her cohere". Chopra's performance earned her the Filmfare Award for Best Actress (Critics) and a nomination for the Filmfare Award, IIFA Award, Producers Guild Film Award, and Screen Award for Best Actress.

Chopra's final release of the year saw her reprising her role as Roma in the second installment of the Don franchise, Don 2. Although the film received mixed reviews, Chopra's performance earned positive feedback from critics. According to The Express Tribune, "Chopra ... seems to be the perfect choice for an action heroine. As you watch her effortlessly beat up some thugs in the movie, you come to the realization that she may be the first proper female action hero in Bollywood." Don 2 was a major success in India and overseas, earning over ₹2.06 billion (US$22 million) worldwide.

=== Further success (2012–2014) ===
Chopra's first film of 2012 was Karan Malhotra's action drama Agneepath, in which she starred with Hrithik Roshan, Sanjay Dutt and Rishi Kapoor. Produced by Karan Johar, the film is a remake of his father's 1990 production of the same name. In one of several accidents to happen during production, Chopra's lehenga (a traditional skirt) caught fire while filming a sequence for an elaborate Ganpati festival song. She featured as Kaali Gawde, Roshan's loquacious love interest in the film. Mayank Shekhar noted how much Chopra stood out in the male-dominated film. Agneepath broke Bollywood's highest opening-day earnings record, and had a worldwide gross of ₹1.93 billion (US$21 million). Chopra next co-starred with Shahid Kapoor in Kunal Kohli's romance, Teri Meri Kahaani. The film relates the stories of three unconnected couples (each played by Kapoor and Chopra), born in different eras.

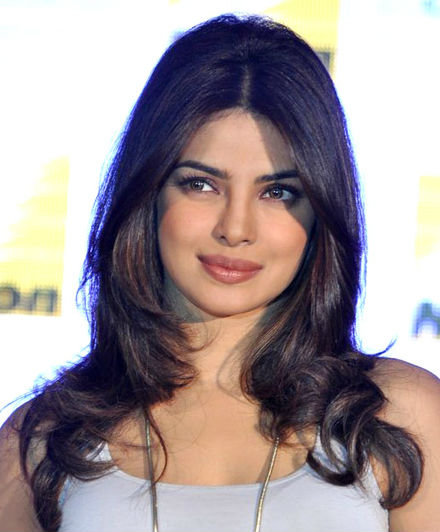
Chopra at an event in 2012

Anurag Basu's Barfi!, with Ranbir Kapoor and Ileana D'Cruz, was her final appearance of 2012. Set in the 1970s, the film tells the story of three people, two of whom are physically disabled. Chopra played Jhilmil Chatterjee, an autistic woman who falls in love with a deaf, mute man (Kapoor). Director Rituparno Ghosh considered it a "very, very brave" role to accept given how demanding it is for an actor to convincingly portray a woman with autism. To prepare for the role, Chopra visited several mental institutions and spent time with autistic people. The film received critical acclaim and was a major commercial success, earning ₹1.75 billion (US$19 million) worldwide. Rachit Gupta of Filmfare found Chopra to be the film's "surprise package" and found her performance to be "the best representation of [autism] on Indian celluloid". Pratim D. Gupta of The Telegraph highly praised Kapoor and Chopra, although he found her to be a "tad showy" in her part. Chopra received Best Actress nominations at the Filmfare, Screen, IIFA and Producers Guild Film Awards. The film was chosen as India's entry for the 85th Academy Awards. Agneepath and Barfi! ranked among the highest grossing Bollywood films to that point.

In 2013, she lent her voice to the character of Ishaani, the reigning Pan-Asian champion from India and the love interest of the main protagonist in the Disneytoon Studios film Planes, a spinoff of Pixar's Cars franchise. Chopra, a fan of Disney films, had fun voicing the character saying "The closest I could come to being a Disney princess, I think, was Ishaani". The film was a commercial success, grossing approximately US$240 million worldwide. She played an NRI girl in the Apoorva Lakhia's bilingual action drama Zanjeer (Thoofan in Telugu), a remake of the 1973 Hindi film of the same name, which met with poor reactions from critics and was unsuccessful at the box office. Chopra next reprised her role of Priya in Rakesh Roshan's Krrish 3—a sequel to the 2006 superhero film Krrish—with Hrithik Roshan, Vivek Oberoi and Kangana Ranaut. Critics felt that Chopra had very little to do in the film. Saibal Chatterjee of NDTV writing that she "is saddled with a sketchily written role and is reduced to the status of a hanger-on waiting for things to unfold". The feature became a box-office success, earning over ₹3 billion (US$32 million) worldwide, to become Chopra's biggest commercial success to that point and her fourth major hit in two years. She danced a contemporary mujra in the song "Ram Chahe Leela" for Sanjay Leela Bhansali's Goliyon Ki Raasleela Ram-Leela.

In 2014, Chopra played the lead female role in Yash Raj Films's romantic action drama Gunday directed by Ali Abbas Zafar, alongside Ranveer Singh, Arjun Kapoor and Irrfan Khan. She portrayed Nandita, a cabaret dancer in Calcutta. Set in the 1970s, the film tells the story of two best friends who fall in love with Nandita. Chopra next starred as the title character in Mary Kom, a biographical film of the five time world boxing champion and Olympic bronze medalist Mary Kom. To prepare for the role, she spent time with Kom and received four months of boxing training. The film premiered at the 2014 Toronto International Film Festival, received positive reviews from critics, and her performance received critical acclaim. Sudhish Kamath from The Hindu criticized the film's screenplay but praised Chopra's "knockout" performance, writing "The spirited actress rises above the material and makes us invest in her and does full justice to the spirit" of the boxer. The Indo-Asian News Service review noted the actress for expressing every shade of the character with "a pitch-perfect bravado". Mary Kom emerged as a commercial success, with revenues of ₹1.04 billion (US$11 million) at the box office. She won the Screen Award for Best Actress, the Producers Guild Film Award for Best Actress in a Leading Role, and received another nomination for the Filmfare Award for Best Actress.

=== Expansion into American film and television (2015–2019) ===
In 2015, Chopra starred in Zoya Akhtar's Dil Dhadakne Do, an ensemble comedy-drama, featuring Anil Kapoor, Shefali Shah, Ranveer Singh and Anushka Sharma. The film tells the story of a dysfunctional Punjabi family (the Mehras), who invite their family and friends on a cruise trip to celebrate the parents' 30th wedding anniversary. She portrayed the role of Ayesha Mehra, a successful entrepreneur and the eldest child. Pratim D. Gupta from The Telegraph wrote of Chopra, "From the propah body language to the measured speech [...] shows the kind of depth she is able to bring to her lines and characters these days. Conversely, Shubhra Gupta of The Indian Express commented that it was time for her "to being a little messy: all these not-a-hair-out-place roles are making her constrained." The cast of Dil Dhadakne Do won the Screen Award for Best Ensemble Cast, and Chopra was nominated for a Screen Award, IIFA Award, and Producers Guild Film Award for Best Actress. In 2016, she dubbed for Kaa, a female python, in the Hindi version of the film The Jungle Book.

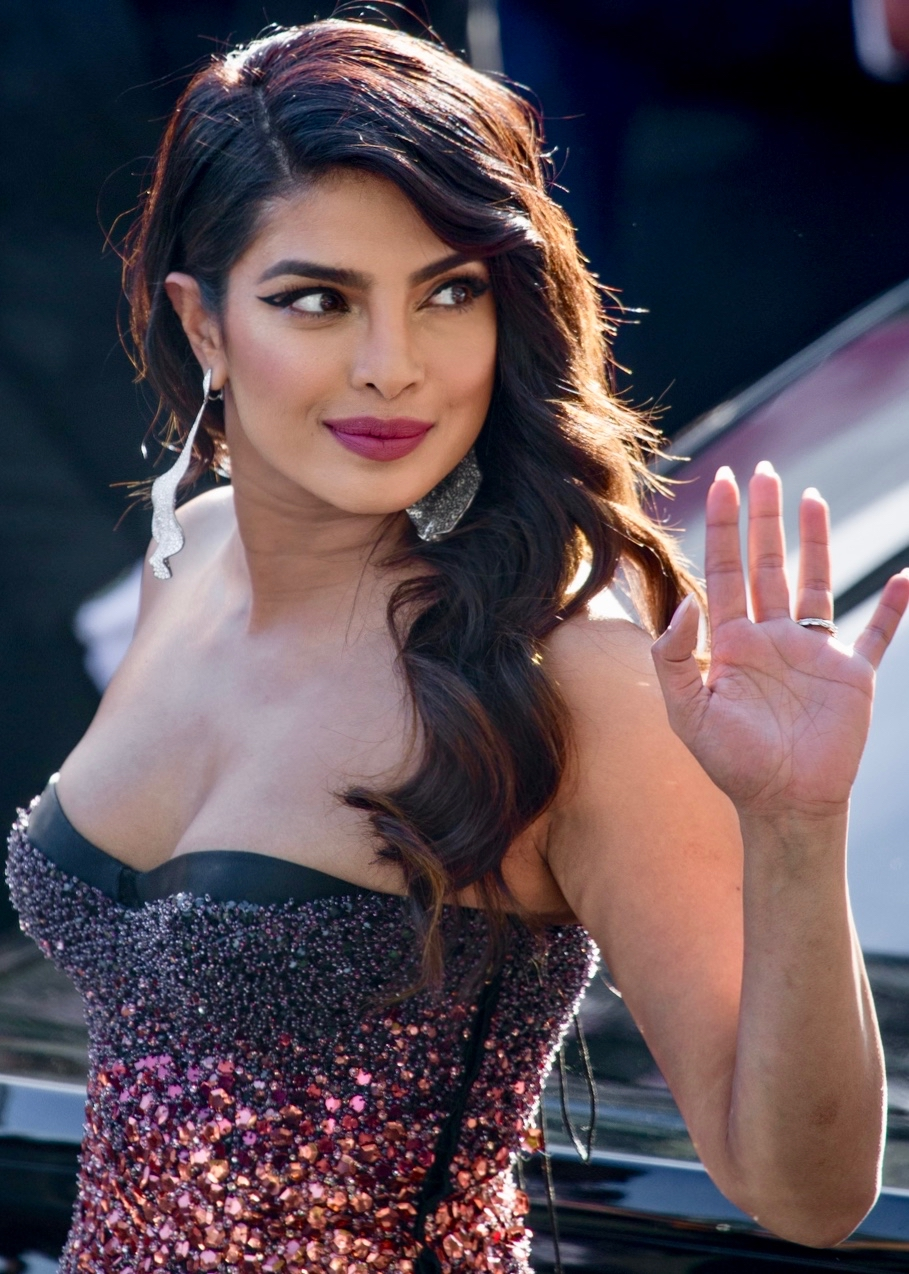
Chopra at the 2019 Cannes Film Festival

Chopra signed a talent holding deal with ABC Studios and was later cast in the American thriller series Quantico as the character Alex Parrish. The series premiered in 2015 on ABC, making Chopra the first South Asian to headline an American network drama series. The series received positive reviews from television critics and Chopra was praised for her performance. Rob Lowman of the Los Angeles Daily News applauded her "dynamic screen presence" and James Poniewozik of The New York Times named Chopra as the "strongest human asset" of the show, and added that "she is immediately charismatic and commanding." She received the People's Choice Award for Favourite Actress In A New TV Series for her role in Quantico, becoming the first South Asian actress to win a People's Choice Award. The following year, Chopra won a second People's Choice Award for Favorite Dramatic TV Actress. Quantico was cancelled after three seasons in 2018. Chopra later said that her move to America was prompted by disagreements with people in Bollywood: "I had people not casting me, I had beef with people, I am not good at playing that game so I kind of was tired of the politics and I said I needed a break.”

Chopra next portrayed Kashibai, the first wife of the Maratha general Peshwa Bajirao I, in Sanjay Leela Bhansali's epic historical romantic drama Bajirao Mastani, alongside Ranveer Singh and Deepika Padukone. The feature opened to highly positive reviews, and Chopra received widespread praise for her portrayal which several reviewers regarded as her best performance to date. Rajeev Masand wrote "the film benefits from a nice touch of playfulness and humor in Priyanka Chopra's Kashibai. Chopra brings grace to the character, and practically steals the film." Film critic Raja Sen thought that Chopra, despite not being in the title role, owned the film, and wrote "Chopra's terrific in the part, her intelligently expressive eyes speaking volumes and her no-nonsense Marathi rhythm bang-on." A major commercial success, Bajirao Mastani grossed ₹3.5 billion (US$37 million) at the box office, becoming one of the highest-grossing Indian films of all time. For her performance, she won the Filmfare Award, IIFA Award, and Screen Award for Best Supporting Actress, and received a nomination for the Producers Guild Film Award for Best Actress in a Leading Role.

In 2016, Chopra starred as a police officer in Prakash Jha's social drama Jai Gangaajal. Writing for The Hindu, Namrata Joshi thought that she "looks off-colour, disinterested and uninvolved with the goings on through most of the film". It did not perform well commercially. The following year, Chopra made her Hollywood live-action film debut by playing the antagonist Victoria Leeds in Seth Gordon's action comedy Baywatch opposite Dwayne Johnson and Zac Efron. The feature received unfavorable reviews. IGN declared Chopra as the highlight of the film, noting she "outshines pretty much anyone she's in a scene with" and wrote "Chopra's engaging and interesting and is the only character that speaks with any kind of distinctive cadence." Scott Mendelson of Forbes wrote "Chopra has fun as the baddie, but she stays in the background until the end of the movie and really only gets one big scene at the end of the picture." Baywatch was not a commercial success in North America but the film performed well in the overseas markets, grossing approximately $178 million at the worldwide box office. The 2018 Sundance Film Festival marked the release of Chopra's next American film, A Kid Like Jake, a drama about gender variance, starring Jim Parsons and Claire Danes. Amy Nicholson of Variety commended her "charming presence" but thought that her role added little value to the film. In early 2019, she had signed on to play the leading lady opposite Salman Khan in Bharat, but opted out days before filming her scenes. Nikhil Namit, a producer of the film, said that she quit due to her engagement to Nick Jonas and accused her of being "a little unprofessional".

In 2019, Chopra had another supporting part, as a yoga ambassador, in Todd Strauss-Schulson's comedy Isn't It Romantic, which starred Rebel Wilson. The film was well received by critics and grossed approximately $49 million at the North American box office. Dana Schwartz of Entertainment Weekly considered her to be "perfectly cast" but Benjamin Lee of The Guardian thought that she was "not quite interesting enough". She returned to Hindi cinema (as Priyanka Chopra Jonas) later in 2019 with Shonali Bose's biographical drama The Sky Is Pink, in which she played mother to Aisha Chaudhary, a teenager suffering from a terminal illness. She also produced the project, and connected with the story for its blend of humour and tragedy. Kate Erbland of IndieWire found her to be "extraordinary" as "the film's driving force, a tough-talking mama bear", and Anna M. M. Vetticad took note of the "simmering restraint" in her performance. The film did not do well at the box office. She received another nomination for the Filmfare Award for Best Actress.

=== Streaming projects (2020–present) ===
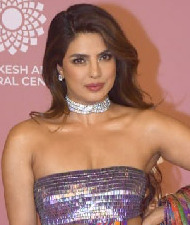
Chopra Jonas in 2023

In 2020, Chopra Jonas signed a two-year multimillion-dollar first-look TV deal with Amazon Prime Video to back content by first time BIPOC and female filmmakers. Her release that year was Netflix's children superhero film We Can Be Heroes directed by Robert Rodriguez. She starred as Ms. Granada, the director of a superhero organisation called Heroics. The feature received generally positive reviews; Richard Roeper from the Chicago Sun-Times praised the actress for "livening up the proceedings" as the strait-laced Ms. Granada, and Ian Freer of Empire felt that she did the "kids' film acting to the hilt". Her first film of 2021 was Ramin Bahrani's The White Tiger, an adaptation of Aravind Adiga's satirical novel of the same name. She starred alongside Adarsh Gourav and Rajkummar Rao as Pinky Shah, the latter's character's wife, and also executive produced this Netflix production. Critical reviews towards the film and her performance were positive. Variety described her role as a "feminist who [cannot] fathom how mired in the dark ages [her husband's family] can be". Writing for The Times, film critic Kevin Maher deemed Chopra's performance "impressive" and The Hollywood Reporter's David Rooney commended her for bringing "emotional depth" to her role. The film received a Best Adapted Screenplay nomination at the 93rd Academy Awards. Later that year, Chopra appeared in the stand-up comedy special Jonas Brothers Family Roast on Netflix. Her final film release of 2021 was the science fiction film The Matrix Resurrections, the fourth installment in The Matrix film series, appearing in a supporting role alongside Keanu Reeves, Carrie-Anne Moss, Yahya Abdul-Mateen II, Jessica Henwick, and Jonathan Groff. She played a grown-up version of Sati, an exile program that was introduced in the previous film. Resurrections received mixed reviews and underperformed at the box office, grossing US$160 million against a US$190 million budget. NDTV's Saibal Chatterjee wrote that Chopra's role "makes an impact despite its limited length".

In 2023, Chopra Jonas next starred opposite Richard Madden in Prime Video's action thriller series Citadel. She played Nadia Sinh, a top-class spy who partners with Madden's character to take down the criminal syndicate that destroyed the spy agency Citadel and erased their memories. With a production budget of US$300 million, the six-episode first season made the series one of the most-expensive television shows. It marked the first time in her 22-year career—at that point—thar Chopra received equal pay with her male co-star. She performed many of her own stunts, and suffered a permanent scar from an injury on her eyebrow. Critics had mixed opinions on the series, but Jasper Rees of The Daily Telegraph was particularly impressed by Chopra Jonas' potential as a female James Bond, finding her "flirty and funny and hard as a bag of nine-inch nails". Nick Allen of Roger Ebert wrote that Citadel positioned her as a "future action star", praising her "ass-kicking choreography" and "mix of determination and humor". Chopra and Madden's chemistry was remarked by critics among the show's strong and redeeming features. Citadel was renewed for a second season, which will premiere in mid-2026. Chopra then led the romantic comedy drama Love Again, opposite Sam Heughan and Celine Dion, an English remake of the 2016 German film SMS für Dich. The film was panned by critics and became a box office bomb. In 2024, Chopra served as the narrator of Disneynature's Tiger, a documentary about Bengal tigers which was released on Disney+.

She starred alongside John Cena and Idris Elba in the action comedy Heads of State, which released on Prime Video in July 2025. Chopra Jonas played a senior MI6 agent who is tasked with protecting the prime minister of the United Kingdom and the president of the United States from a foreign adversary. The film was met with mixed reviews from critics. Chopra's performance was received favorably; The A.V. Club's Tim Grierson described her as "the film's true action star". She played the leading role in another Russo brothers–Prime Video film: the swashbuckler action thriller The Bluff, which released in February 2026. Starring alongside Karl Urban, Chopra will portray a former pirate in late 19th century Cayman Islands who confronts her violent past.

She will star opposite Mahesh Babu in filmmaker S. S. Rajamouli's action-adventure Varanasi, her first Indian film since 2019 and first Telugu-language film since 2013. With a budget of ₹13 billion (US$150 million), it is the most expensive Indian film made. The film is slated for release in 2027. Chopra Jonas joined the cast of the comedy Judgment Day in April 2025 with Zac Efron.

== Music career ==
Chopra's main vocal influence was her father, who helped develop her interest in singing. She used her vocal talent early in her pageantry career. Her first recording, the song "Ullathai Killathe" in the Tamil film Thamizhan (2002), was made at the urging of her director and co-star, Vijay (who had noticed her singing on the set). She declined to sing playback for "Tinka Tinka" in her film Karam (2005), preferring to concentrate on her acting career, but later sang the song live on the television programme Sa Re Ga Ma Pa. Chopra recorded an unreleased song for Bluffmaster! (2005). In August 2011, Universal Music Group signed Chopra to a worldwide recording agreement with DesiHits. The deal indicated that her first studio album would be released by Interscope Records in North America and by Island Records elsewhere.

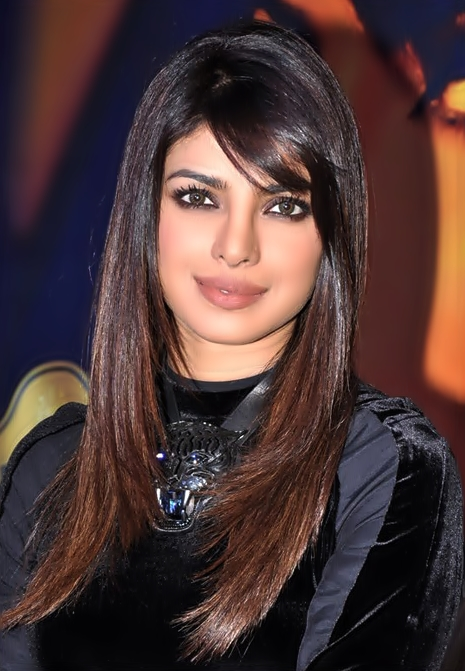
Chopra promoting her song In My City

In July 2012, Chopra became the first Bollywood star signed by Creative Artists Agency, an entertainment and sports agency based in Los Angeles. The album was produced by RedOne. Her first single, "In My City", debuted in the US on 13 September 2012 in a TV spot for the NFL Network's Thursday Night Football; a shortened version of the song was used to open each show of the season. "In My City" features rapper will.i.am; according to Chopra, a co-writer, the song was inspired by her unsettled childhood and her journey from a small-town girl to a celebrity. The song received mixed reviews from critics, and was a commercial success in India; it sold more than 130,000 copies in its first week, topped the Hindi pop chart and was certified triple platinum. In the United States the single was unsuccessful, with 5,000 digital downloads in its first week according to Nielsen SoundScan, and did not receive radio play. In October 2012, the single won her the Best International Debut award at the People's Choice Awards India. In December 2012, she received three nominations: Best Female Artist, Best Song and Best Video (for "In My City") at the World Music Awards. Chopra was also featured on "Erase", an EDM song produced by the American DJ and producer duo The Chainsmokers.

In July 2013, Chopra released her second single "Exotic" featuring American rapper Pitbull, along with its music video. "Exotic" debuted at number 16 on the Billboard Dance/Electronic Songs and number 11 on the Dance/Electronic Digital Songs chart on 27 July 2013 issue. The single also entered at number 74 on the Canadian Hot 100 chart. "Exotic" debuted at number 44 on the Billboard Hot Dance Club Songs chart and peaked at number 12. Her third single, a cover of Bonnie Raitt's "I Can't Make You Love Me" was released in April 2014. The song peaked at number 28 on the Billboard Hot Dance/Electronic Songs chart.

Chopra's first song as a playback singer in Bollywood was "Chaoro", a lullaby from Mary Kom (2014). In 2015, she sang the title song, a duet with Farhan Akhtar, for Dil Dhadakne Do. She recorded a promotional song for Ventilator (2016), making her Marathi language playback singing debut with "Baba". In 2017, Chopra collaborated with the Australian DJ Will Sparks for "Young and Free", an EDM song which she also wrote. Chopra later said that her music career "was not living up to my standards" and that it would have been "futile" to have kept pursuing it.

== Philanthropy ==
Chopra supports various causes through her foundation "The Priyanka Chopra Foundation for Health and Education", which works towards providing support to unprivileged children across the country in the areas of Education and Health. She donates ten percent of her earnings to fund the foundation's operations, and pays for educational and medical expenses for seventy children in India, fifty among whom are girls. She speaks out on women's issues: against female infanticide and foeticide, and in support of education for girls. A believer in feminism, Chopra has been vocal about women's rights, gender equality, and gender pay gap. In 2006, a "day with Chopra" was auctioned on eBay; the proceeds were donated to an NGO, Nanhi Kali, which helps educate girls in India. She has made appearances in support of other charities, such as the 2005 HELP! Telethon Concert to raise funds for the victims of the 2004 Indian Ocean earthquake.

She has worked with UNICEF since 2006, recording public-service announcements and participating in media panel discussions promoting children's rights and the education of girls, and also participated in celebrating the 20th anniversary of the Convention on the Rights of the Child. She was appointed as the national UNICEF Goodwill Ambassador for Child Rights on 10 August 2010. UNICEF Representative Karin Hulshof said of the appointment: "She is equally passionate about her work on behalf of children and adolescents. We are proud of the work she has done with us so far on child rights, and, we are thrilled about all what we will be doing together so that no child gets left behind." In 2009, she shot a documentary for the organisation Alert India to increase understanding of leprosy. She modelled for designer Manish Malhotra and Shaina NC's charity fashion show to raise funds for the Cancer Patients Aid Association NGO. In 2010 Chopra was one of several celebrities who created promotional messages for Pearls Wave Trust, which campaigns against violence and abuse of women and girls. Chopra also launched the "Save the Girl Child" campaign, which aims to change the attitudes of Indians towards girls. In 2012 Chopra spoke at the launch of Awakening Youth, an anti-addiction programme.

At a public event in 2019, an activist criticised Chopra for a tweet in which she hailed India's military forces while tensions amid Pakistan and India were escalating. The main line of argument was that she was warmongering and that was incompatible with her job as UN Peace Ambassador. Chopra's response at the event was that she is patriotic. Pakistan asked for Chopra being sacked from her UN job but UN supported Chopra's right to talk for herself.

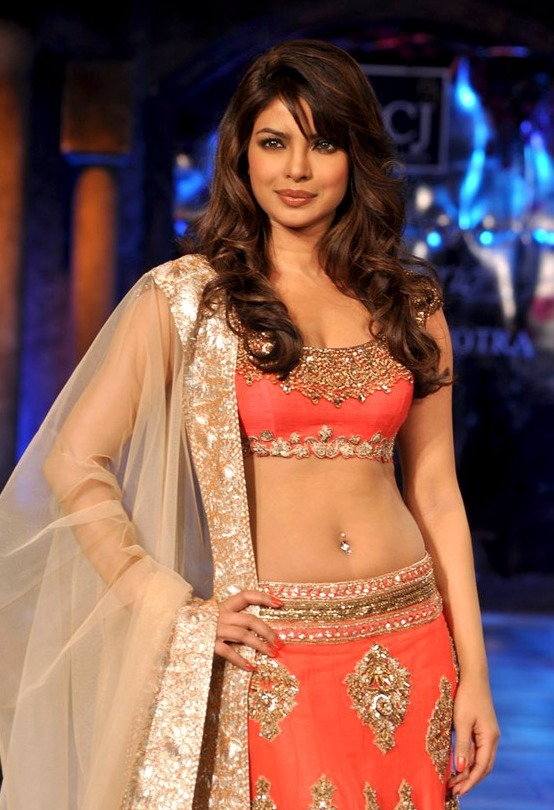
Chopra on the ramp for Mijwan charity fashion show in 2012

Chopra is a supporter of environmental charities and is brand ambassador for NDTV Greenathon, an initiative to support eco-friendliness and provide solar power to rural villages without electricity supplies. She appeared with children in an animated video to support the cause, and removed rubbish from the banks of the Yamuna river in Agra to increase awareness of environmental issues. During the third and fourth editions of Greenathon, She adopted up to seven villages to provide with a regular supply of electricity. She adopted a tigress in 2011 and a lioness in 2012 at the Birsa biological park, paying for both animals upkeep for a year. To promote organ donation, Chopra pledged to donate her own organs after death and was co-keynote speaker at the University of Pittsburgh Medical Center's Bollywood-themed 20th-anniversary celebration of its liver-transplant programme in 2012.

She donated ₹5 million (US$53,000) to Nanavati hospital to build a cancer ward. The ward, which is named after her late father, was inaugurated by her in 2013. The same year, she provided voice-over in English and Hindi for the documentary film Girl Rising for the organisation of the same name. She was invited as one of the speakers alongside Gordon Brown, Steve Wozniak, Bill Clinton, and Charlie Baker for the 50th anniversary of the World Leaders Conference at the Hynes Convention Center, Boston. She spoke about women empowerment through education, discussing inequality and the challenges of education for women. Chopra also lent her voice to a music video of John Lennon's "Imagine". The video featuring her along with other singers, including Katy Perry, and The Black Eyed Peas was created as part of a global campaign by UNICEF to celebrate the 25th anniversary of the Convention on the Rights of the Child.

Indian prime minister Narendra Modi selected Chopra as one of his nine nominees called "Navratna" in 2014 for the Swachh Bharat Abhiyan, a national cleanliness campaign by the Government of India. She lent her support to the campaign by working as a sanitation worker for a day, cleaning and rehabilitating a garbage-laden neighbourhood in Mumbai, and urged people to maintain the cleanliness.

In 2015, she voiced People for the Ethical Treatment of Animals (PETA's) life-size robotic elephant named "Ellie", who visited schools across the United States and Europe to educate kids about elephants and captivity, and to urge people to boycott circuses. Chopra was appointed as the global UNICEF Goodwill Ambassador in December 2016. In 2017, Variety honoured her with the Power of Women award for her philanthropic work with UNICEF and she received the Mother Teresa Memorial Award for Social Justice for her contribution towards social causes. Two years later, Chopra was awarded the Danny Kaye Humanitarian Award by UNICEF for her "philanthropic work and dedication towards the welfare of the society" at the UNICEF Snowflake Ball 2019.

In December 2019, Chopra teamed-up with the United Nations Children's Fund and the Crocs Company to donate 50,000 pairs of shoes to school children in the Central American country, Belize.

In late April 2021, due to the COVID-19 pandemic in India, Chopra along with husband Nick opened a fundraiser along with NGO GiveIndia to get donations for oxygen supply, COVID-19 care centers, testing, and vaccination efforts. The fundraiser had achieved US$400,000 in the first few days. By 13 May 2021, the fundraiser had achieved the $1 million landmark and put its newer target at $3 million for COVID-19 relief.

== Other works ==
=== Film production and entrepreneurship ===
Chopra set up her production company Purple Pebble Pictures with an aim to produce small budget films and introduce and promote new talent in the Indian film industry, particularly regional Indian films. Her first Marathi film, the 2016 comedy-drama Ventilator, was a box office success and went on to win three awards at the 64th National Film Awards. She went on to produce several Indian regional language films, including Pahuna: The Little Visitors (2018) and Paani (2019), which won the National Film Award for Best Film on Environment Conservation/Preservation at the 66th National Film Awards. In 2025, she attached herself as an executive producer on the short film Anuja.

Chopra started investing in tech companies in 2018 by investing in a coding education startup called Holberton School and Bumble. Bumble was launched in India with the help of Chopra in October 2018. In 2021, it was reported that she had invested in the US-based rental marketplace Apartment List. At the Startup India Prarambh event 2021, Chopra said that "ideas are the currency of the present" and that she was looking forward to further invest in a mix of beauty and tech startups. The same month, she launched a haircare line called "Anamoly Haircare" which became available exclusively in Target stores in the United States on 1 February 2021 and was planned to be available internationally later that year. In March 2021, Chopra opened her new restaurant Sona in Manhattan, featuring haute-couture Indian cuisine.

=== Television presenting and stage performances ===
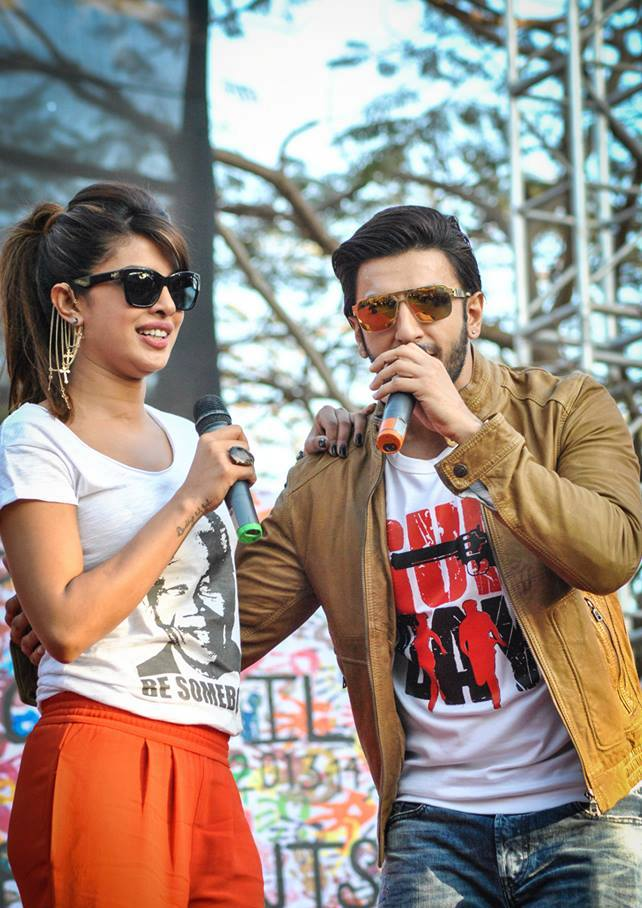
Chopra with Ranveer Singh at an event

In 2007, Chopra was on the judges' panel of the Miss India pageant. She stated, "Miss India will always remain special. That's where it all started for me. And maybe that's where it would've ended if I hadn't won the crown." She also served as a judge at Miss World 2009. She visited Jawan troops in Tenga, in eastern India, for a special episode of the NDTV show Jai Jawan celebrating the 60th anniversary of India's independence.

In 2010, she hosted the third season of the reality show Fear Factor: Khatron Ke Khiladi on the Colors channel, taking over from previous host Akshay Kumar. According to contestants, in hosting the series, Chopra had "transformed into quite a whip-wielding dictator", relentlessly pushing the contestants to work. She performed most of her own stunts, adamant to prove that she could rival Akshay Kumar, who had hosted the previous two seasons. The opening ratings of the show topped those of the two previous seasons. The show was praised by critics, and earned her the Indian Telly Award for Most Impactful Debut on Television. In February 2016, Chopra presented the award for Best Film Editing at the 88th Academy Awards.

Chopra has participated in a number of world tours and concerts. She took part in a world concert tour, "Temptations 2004", and performed with other Bollywood actors (including Shah Rukh Khan, Saif Ali Khan, Rani Mukerji, Preity Zinta and Arjun Rampal) in 19 stage shows. In 2011, she participated (with Shahid Kapoor and Shah Rukh Khan) in a concert in Durban, South Africa celebrating 150 years of India–South Africa friendship. In 2012, she performed at M. A. Chidambaram Stadium, Chennai in the opening ceremony of the fifth season of cricket's Indian Premier League with Amitabh Bachchan, Salman Khan, Kareena Kapoor and Katy Perry. The same year, she performed at Dubai Festival City's Ahlan Bollywood Concert with other Bollywood stars such as Salman Khan and Sophie Choudry.

In 2021, Chopra along with her husband Nick Jonas, announced the nominees for the 93rd Academy Awards.

=== Writing ===
Chopra began writing an opinion column for the Hindustan Times in 2009. She wrote a total of 50 columns for the newspaper. She said after her first year of writing: "I'm a private person and never thought that I could express my feelings. But strangely enough, whenever I sat down to write this column, my inner most thoughts came to the fore." In March 2009, she met several readers who had submitted feedback on her weekly column. She continued to write sporadically for newspapers. In August 2012 she wrote a column published in The Times of India titled "No woman in Mumbai feels safe any longer", discussing the murder of 25-year-old Pallavi Purkayastha, whom she met while working on Don. In the article, Chopra expressed her views about the safety of women in cities. In a July 2014 article published in The Guardian, Chopra criticised female genital mutilation and child marriage.

Later that year, Chopra wrote an op-ed for The New York Times titled "What Jane Austen Knew" about the importance of education for girls. She praised and quoted Nobel Peace Prize winners Malala Yousafzai and Kailash Satyarthi, and described how her desire to help others was triggered when, at 9, she joined her parents while they volunteered their spare time to offer modern health care to the rural poor. In late 2014, Chopra began writing a monthly column, "Pret-a-Priyanka", for Elle. In an article published in January 2015, she expressed her views on diversity and being a global citizen. Released by Penguin Random House, Chopra published her first memoir titled Unfinished on 9 February 2021. In a rave review, Associated Press's Molly Sprayregen termed the book "deeply open and honest account" and wrote "Chopra Jonas' writing is open, engaging, and full of energy. She writes, it seems, to connect. The experience feels intimate, like Chopra Jonas is exchanging stories with a friend over coffee. Her stories are exceedingly personal, and despite being an international movie star, many of them even feel relatable." Unfinished reached The New York Times Best Seller list in the United States.

== Personal life ==
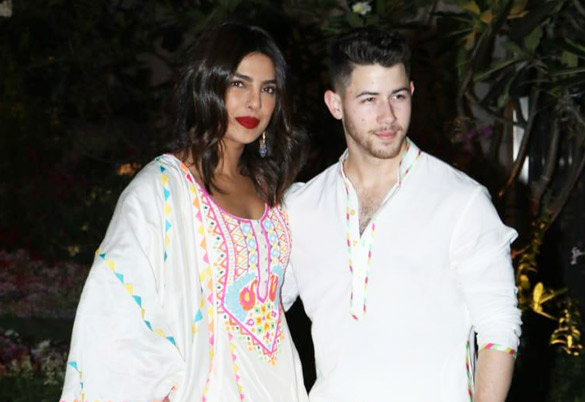
Chopra with her husband Nick Jonas at a Holi celebration party in Mumbai in 2020

Chopra lived in an apartment on the same floor as her family before moving to the US. She was especially close to her father, who died in 2013; in 2012, she got a tattoo reading "Daddy's lil girl" in his handwriting. Not having come from a film background, she has called herself a self-made woman. Her mother, a well-established gynaecologist in Bareilly, gave up her practice to support Chopra as she embarked upon a film career.

A practising Hindu, Chopra performs a puja every morning at a small shrine consisting of various murtis of Hindu deities. Although known for her media-friendly attitude, she is publicly reticent about her personal life. Chopra started dating American singer and actor Nick Jonas in May 2018. Jonas proposed to her on 19 July 2018 in Crete. Chopra and Jonas became engaged in August 2018 in a Punjabi Roka ceremony in Mumbai. In December 2018, they married at Umaid Bhawan Palace, Jodhpur, in Hindu and Christian ceremonies. Chopra legally changed her full name to "Priyanka Chopra Jonas". In January 2022, the couple had a daughter, Malti Marie Chopra Jonas, via surrogacy.

== Public and media image ==
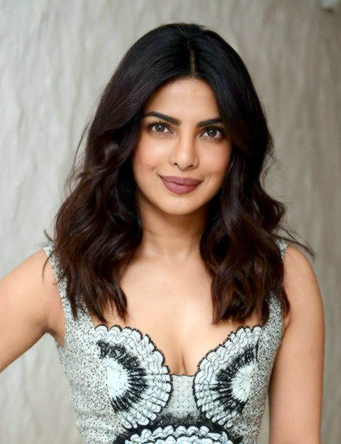
Chopra in 2016

Chopra is known in the Indian media and film industry for her professionalism and is popularly known as "PeeCee", "PC", and "Piggy Chops". She has had a Twitter account since 2009, and was the tenth-most followed Indian on the platform as of 2012. In 2012, she was declared the most influential Indian on social media in a survey conducted by Pinstorm, and in 2015, she appeared on HuffPost's "100 Most Influential Women on Twitter" list, ranking first among Indians. As of August 2024, she is one of the most-followed people on Instagram.

Remarking upon her role choices, CNN-IBN described Chopra as a powerful modern actress unafraid of experimenting with roles. Analysing Chopra's career, Bollywood Hungama noted her constant growth as a performer despite career fluctuations. The Times of India called her a "game changer" for changing "the age-old demarcation between a hero and heroine". In 2012, film critic Subhash K. Jha labelled her "the best actress in the post-Sridevi generation" and listed her character in Barfi! as being "one of the finest inwardly ravaged characters in Bollywood." Chopra has often featured on Rediff.com's annual listing of "Bollywood's Best Actresses", ranking first in 2009, and was featured in their list of "Top 10 Actresses of 2000–2010".

A high-profile and popular celebrity in India, Chopra is described as a sex symbol and a style icon. Her figure, eyes, lips and looks have been cited by the media as her distinctive physical features. Designers Falguni and Shane Peacock wrote, "She is comfortable in her own skin and looks ravishing in whatever she wears, be it a bikini, short or long dress or even a sari." She was named "India's Best-Dressed Woman of the Year" by People India in 2011. She ranks highly on various beauty listings in the world. The UK magazine Eastern Eye ranked her first on their list of "World's Sexiest Asian Women" for a record five times (2006, 2012, 2014, 2015 and 2017). Chopra also topped the Maxim India's Hot 100 list in 2011, 2013, 2016 and 2018. In 2017, Buzznet named her the world's second most beautiful woman after Beyoncé. Chopra was named one of People magazine's Most Beautiful Women in the World in 2017 and 2019.

Chopra has featured on power listings, including Verve's most powerful Indian women (2009, 2010, 2013, 2015, and 2016), The Indian Express's most powerful Indians (2016 and 2017), and India Today's 50 most powerful people in India (2017 and 2018). After debuting in Hollywood, Chopra appeared in other lists, including People's Most Intriguing People of the Year (2015), Time's 100 Most Influential People in the World (2016), Forbes' World's 100 Most Powerful Women (2017 and 2018), Variety's 500 most influential business leaders (2017 and 2018), and USA Today's 50 most powerful women in entertainment (2019). The market research firm YouGov named her the world's twelfth and fourteenth most-admired woman in 2018 and 2019, respectively.

Chopra is also one of the highest-paid Indian celebrities and the highest paid actress in Bollywood. She has featured in the Indian edition of "Celebrity 100" every year since its inception in 2012, ranking under top fifteen each year except 2018. Chopra ranked as the highest earning Indian female celebrity in 2016 and 2017 with respective earnings of ₹760 million (US$8.1 million) and ₹680 million (US$7.3 million), peaking at the seventh position in 2017. The global edition of Forbes named her the world's eighth-highest-paid TV actress both years. Chopra is a prominent celebrity endorser for brands and products. She ranked second in the list of brand ambassadors of 2008 (after Shah Rukh Khan) in a survey conducted by TAM AdEx. The following year, she topped their list, becoming the first woman in India to do so. Chopra has represented many brands, including TAG Heuer, Pepsi, Nikon, Nokia, Garnier and Nestlé; she was the first female representative of Hero Honda. In 2016, Chopra became the first Indian woman to represent Pantene as its global brand ambassador. In 2017, Forbes reported that Chopra earned at least $1 million per endorsement deal. In 2020, Chopra was one among several Bollywood actors who were criticised on social media for posting Instagram messages showing solidarity with the Black Lives Matter movement, despite their previous work advertising skin-lightening products which perpetuate colourism. In the past Chopra has expressed regret for promoting such products.

Chopra and three other Bollywood actors (Shah Rukh Khan, Kajol and Hrithik Roshan) had their likenesses made into a series of miniature dolls for U.S. toy manufacturer Hasbro and the UK-based Bollywood Legends Corporation. In 2009, Chopra became the first Indian actress to cast a foot impression at the Salvatore Ferragamo Museum in Florence, Italy, and she received custom-designed shoes from the Ferragamo house. Madame Tussauds museum installed four wax sculptures of her in 2019 at four locations, including New York, London, Sydney, and a traveling exhibit between several Asian cities, making her the first Indian actor to have wax statues in four Madame Tussauds museums. In 2013, she became the first Indian model to represent Guess, whose CEO Paul Marciano called her "the young Sophia Loren". Chopra's life, pictures of her family and win at the Miss World in 2000 were depicted in a chapter of Roving Families, Shifting Homes, a book taught at Springdales School. Three unauthorised biographies of her have been published: Indu Prabhu's Priyanka Chopra: Road To Destiny (2016), Aseem Chhabra's Priyanka Chopra: The Incredible Story of a Global Bollywood Star (2018) and Bharathi S. Pradhan's Priyanka Chopra: The Dark Horse (2018).

== Awards and nominations ==
Chopra has won a National Film Award for Best Actress for Fashion (2008) and five Filmfare Awards: Best Female Debut for Andaaz (2003), Best Performance in a Negative Role for Aitraaz (2004), Best Actress for Fashion (2008), Critics Award for Best Actress for 7 Khoon Maaf (2011), and Best Supporting Actress for Bajirao Mastani (2015). She has also won two People's Choice Awards: "Favourite Actress In A New TV Series", and "Favorite Dramatic TV Actress" for Quantico. She is the first South Asian actress to win a People's Choice Award. In 2016, she was awarded the Padma Shri, the fourth highest civilian award, by the Government of India for her contribution to arts and was honored as one of the BBC 100 Women in 2022.

== Bibliography ==
- Chopra Jonas, Priyanka (9 February 2021). Unfinished. New York: Penguin Random House. ISBN 978-1-984819-21-5.

== See also ==
- List of Priyanka Chopra performances

== Explanatory notes ==
Awards and achievements
Preceded by Yukta Mookhey	Miss World; 2000	Succeeded by Agbani Darego
Preceded by Yukta Mookhey	Miss World Asia & Oceania; 2000	Succeeded by Li Bing
Preceded by Yukta Mookhey	Femina Miss India World; 2000	Succeeded by Sara Corner
