= Unfinished (book) =

2021 memoir by Priyanka Chopra

- Author: Priyanka Chopra Jonas
- Language: English
- Genre: Memoir
- Published: 9 February 2021
- Publisher: Penguin Random House
- Publication place: India; United States
- Pages: 256
- ISBN: 978-1984819215

Unfinished is a 2021 memoir by Indian actress Priyanka Chopra Jonas. Described as a "collection of personal essays, stories and observations", the book chronicles important moments in Chopra Jonas' life and her twenty-year-long career, such as working as an actress-producer and UNICEF Goodwill Ambassador and her marriage to the American singer and actor Nick Jonas.

After facing a one-month postponement, it was released by Penguin Random House on 9 February 2021 and reached The New York Times Best Seller list in the United States and topped the Nielsen BookScan best seller list in India.

== Synopsis ==
It has been described as a collection of personal essays, stories and observations by Chopra Jonas. Unfinished chronicles important moments in Chopra Jonas' life and her twenty-year-long career, such as working as an actress-producer and a UNICEF Goodwill Ambassador.

== Background and release ==
In June 2018, it was announced that Indian actress Priyanka Chopra Jonas would publish her memoir titled Unfinished in 2019 by Penguin Books in India, Ballantine Books in the United States, and Michael Joseph in the United Kingdom. In October 2020, Chopra Jonas announced that the book would go on sale on 19 January 2021. Pre-orders started on 2 October 2020. The release, however, was postponed to 9 February 2021.

== Reception ==
Unfinished received critical acclaim. Writing for Associated Press, Molly Sprayregen, who termed the book as "deeply open and honest account", wrote, "Chopra Jonas' writing is open, engaging, and full of energy. She writes, it seems, to connect. The experience feels intimate, like Chopra Jonas is exchanging stories with a friend over coffee. Her stories are exceedingly personal, and despite being an international movie star, many of them even feel relatable." Shaistha Khan from Arab News felt that the book was "written for a Western audience, further strengthening Chopra's foothold in Hollywood". Divya Kala Bhavani of The Hindu called it "an unapologetic tribute to how hard Chopra Jonas worked and continues to work in contentious Hollywood but how she thrives in it". In a review published in The Quint, Karishma Upadhyay spoke of how Chopra Jonas' writing "sounds exactly how she talks—measured, engaging and full of humour and energy".

Unfinished reached The New York Times Best Seller list in the United States and topped the Nielsen BookScan best seller list in India.
