= Vega Jane =

Series of four novels by David Baldacci

- The Finisher (U.K.: The Secrets of Sorcery); The Keeper (U.K.: The Maze of Monsters); The Width of the World (U.K.: The Rebels' Revolt); The Stars Below (U.K.: The End of Time)
- Author: David Baldacci
- Illustrator: Nathan Aardvark; Matthew Laznicka
- Country: United States
- Genre: fantasy
- Publisher: Scholastic Press
- Published: 2014 - 2019
- Media type: Print (hardback & paperback); Audiobook; E-book

Vega Jane is a series of four young adult fantasy novels written by American author David Baldacci. It follows the adventures of a teenage girl as she uncovers secrets about the fictional village of Wormwood and faces the dangers of the 'Quag', a forest filled with beasts. The series was first published in the US in 2014 by Scholastic Press. The Finisher (novel) and The Keeper spent a collective 41 weeks on The New York Times Best Seller list for Children's Middle Grade E-books with The Finisher peaking at number one, and The Keeper peaking at number three.

The series consists of four novels with the final release, The Stars Below, published in 2019. In 2013, a year before the release of the series, it was announced that Sony Pictures had acquired the rights to Baldacci's The Finisher, the first Vega Jane novel.

In the U.K. the books were published as The Secrets of Sorcery, The Maze of Monsters, The Rebels' Revolt, and The End of Time.

== Origin ==
Author David Baldacci spoke about his inspiration for the series in an interview with WFSB; he stated that "I think one reason I did it was cause I loved reading fantasy when I was a kid, I was a big Lord of the Rings fan." He then goes on to list fantasy authors such as C. S. Lewis and Lewis Carroll as childhood inspirations of his, stating that the fantasy genre "really had an impact on me, it made me a reader for life... and a fantasy if you understand, it really liberates your imagination... so I was able to build, literally, a world from scratch, and put every element into that world that I wanted"

Baldacci began writing The Finisher in 2008, after receiving a blank page book for Christmas. In preparation for writing his first fantasy novel Baldacci re-read his favorite fantasy books, including works by Jasper Fforde and modern fantasy novels such as Harry Potter. Baldacci also read books on mythology, religion and ancient worlds for inspiration for his story. He also researched slang and old English to create a unique language for his characters.

=== Publishing history ===
After completing The Finisher, the first novel in the Vega Jane series, Baldacci sent the book to publishers under the name Janus Pope, in an interview with WUSA, Baldacci stated: "I didn't want publishers to buy the book just because my name was on it and they could sell a million copies." Baldacci used the name Janus Pope as a reference to the two-faced Roman god of the same name, stating that he "thought it appropriate for someone hiding his real identity" The novel was bought by Scholastic in August 2013.

== Plot ==
=== The Finisher (U.K.: The Secrets of Sorcery) ===
The first novel in the series follows Vega Jane, a fourteen-year-old girl, as she uncovers secrets about the fictional village of Wormwood. The village is surrounded by the 'Quag' a dark forest filled with dangerous beasts and 'outliers', the Quag is described in the book as "an impenetrable barrier that circled Wormwood like a noose." Vega lives in a boarding house called 'The Loons' with her intelligent younger brother called John Jane. Vega works as a 'Finisher', a person whose job it is to add the final touches to handicrafts before they are purchased. One morning Vega witnesses Quentin Herms, her colleague and mentor, being chased into the Quag by the village Council and their attack canines. She later finds a note written by Quentin stating that he had left her something, she later finds this object hidden in her treehouse, it is a map of the Quag with detailed descriptions of the creatures it contains. Vega's younger brother John is then taken by Morrigone, the 'keeper of Wormwood', he is chosen for his exceptional intelligence to help the Council in constructing a wall to keep out dangers from the Quag. Vega then inherits 'Destin', a chain that allows her to fly when worn. She also finds an Adder stone with magical properties that can heal cuts and bruises when you think good thoughts. She also acquires an 'Elemental', a shield of sorts that can grow and shrink. The Council discovers Vega is in possession of a map of the Quag, they imprison her and put her on trial, threatening her with execution before offering her a chance at freedom in return for fighting in the 'Duelum', a twice a year event where all between 20 and 24 years old must fight until there is only one winner. Vega accepts and goes on to be declared the "champion of the Duelum". However, after winning the Duelum, Vega decides to escape Wormwood with her dog 'Harry Two' and her friend Delph. With Morrigone and the council after her, they use the magical chain Destin to fly over the wall surrounding Wormwood, into the Quag. They are then chased by monsters to the edge of a cliff where they are forced to jump.

=== The Keeper (U.K.: The Maze of Monsters) ===
The second novel in the series follows the events directly after the ending of the first, with the trio, Vega, her dog Harry Two, and her friend Delph, jumping off a cliff after being chased by monsters in the Quag. The plot focuses on the companions and their journey through the Quag as they battle monsters and try to stay alive. The trio survive the fall from the cliff but they are soon captured and taken prisoner by the 'Ekos', a subterranean society led by a former resident of Wormwood that calls himself 'King Thorne'. However, Vega and Delph, along with help from some of the Ekos, are able to defeat Thorne and escape. Soon after they escape a storm comes, separating Vega and Delph. Vega then comes across Astrea Prine, the 'Keeper' of the Quag and a being that is over 800 years old. Astrea led the people who would go on to found Wormwood, and was alive when they went to war with the 'Maladon', a group of people described as thriving on pain and suffering. Astrea and her people lost the battle with the Maladon and the remaining survivors retreated to found the settlement of Wormwood where they used magic to build the Quag as a defense system to keep the Maladon out. Astrea finds Delph and explains that as the Keeper of the Quag, she must keep them prisoner as no-one is supposed to cross the Quag. However, Vega has learnt that like Astrea, she too is a powerful sorceress; Vega then fights back against her imprisonment, escaping with Delph. After fleeing from Astrea, Vega and Delph continue to proceed through the five 'circles' of the Quag, where they meet Lackland and Petra who decide to join them in their journey. Together the companions face numerous creatures such as 'Garms', 'Amarocs', 'Lycans', 'Jabbits', Wendigos and 'Hyperbores'. Lackland is killed in the fifth circle of the Quag by 'Asurter', a fire monster. After Lackland's death Vega is able to escape the Quag with her companions and they begin to head towards a modern-looking town that is nothing like the primitive village of Wormwood.

=== The Width of the World (U.K.: The Rebels' Revolt) ===
The third novel follows the story directly after the ending of The Keeper with the companions escaping the Quag and heading towards a modern-looking town. The plot focuses on Vega's family history and her fight against the 'Maladon' an evil race that are enslaving the minds of people. After escaping the Quag, Vega, Delph, and Petra arrive in a modern town that they come to learn is called True. True is a town of modern innovation, extremely different to the primitive village of Wormwood. The companions are then attacked by the Maladon, this confuses Vega and she discovers that a mark on her hand that she obtained in the Quag is acting as a beacon to the Maladon; however, Vega is able to place a magical glove on her hand which prevents the mark from drawing the Maladon's attention. The companions then discover that the Maladon are enslaving the residents of True by brainwashing them so they remain docile and submissive. They are attacked by the Maladon again and fly away to a clearing in a wood, there they find a house owned by Vega's ancestors, they learn that the house is somehow invisible to the Maladons. They decide to stay at the house while they plan an attack on the Maladons. Vega follows a Maladon to a castle where she witnesses them turning magical people into slaves by draining their power into a bottle. Vega returns to the castle along with Delph and Petra where they then steal bottles of power belonging to the magical people, including a bottle with her grandfathers name on it. Vega then decides to return the power of those that have been turned into slaves and train them to create an army of sorcerers. Vega is later visited by the ghost of Morrigone who tells her that the Maladon destroyed Wormwood and killed almost everyone; she uses a spell to teleport to Wormwood and finds the town in ruins. She learns from the only surviving resident Thansius, that her brother, John, was taken and not killed. She then vows to take her revenge.

=== The Stars Below (U.K.: The End of Time) ===
In The Stars Below, the fourth and final novel in the series, Vega Jane and her companions face Necro, an archmage and leader of the Maladons. Together with her companions and army of sorcerers, Vega plans an assault on Necro and his forces. However, while Vega and Delph were out meeting up with allies, Necro attacks and due to Necro's strength and ability, they are outmatched and lose a large number of their forces, as well as friends and family they found earlier, and the hidden mansion that they used as a refuge from the Maladons. Vega's army lost the battle against Necro; however, with the aid of a divinity, Vega is able to duel Necro alone. With the help of the oath of oblivion, Delph asked her and Petra to take back the third novel that gives her a second chance if she dies, she is able to defeat Necro.

== Critical reception ==
Vega Jane was initially praised for its story and world, with The Guardian stating that The Finisher was "gripping" and "written well". Another critic stated that the world was "richly imagined and vividly realized" while The Bulletin of the Center for Children's Books stated that the world was "clever, intriguing, and refreshingly different". The Keeper was also praised for its fast pace; however, it was criticized for plot conveniences with Kirkus Reviews criticizing the novel for its lack of suspense and sense of danger. The series was also criticized for its similarity to other young adult novels such as Harry Potter with one critic stating that the use of spells and wands "beg (unfavorable) comparison to JK Rowling". Another critic stated that the series "felt unoriginal" and was "full of recycled clichés from the fantasy genre" The language used in the series was also criticized as many common words were replaced by fictional ones, critics stated that this language change was unnecessary and confusing; yet others claimed it made the novel more immersive for the reader.

== Proposed film adaptation ==
In September 2013, a year before the release of the first Vega Jane novel, it was announced that Sony Pictures had acquired the rights to Baldacci's novel The Finisher. The novel was brought to the studio's attention by New York-based book scout Mark James. It was also claimed that Matt Tolmach would be producing. However, the status of the project remains unknown.
