= Finishing =

Finishing can refer to:

- Finishing (whisky), a whisky making method that involves aging of multiple casks
- Finishing (bookbinding), the process of embellishing a book
- Finishing (manufacturing), processes that are applied to a workpiece's surface
- Finishing (textiles), processes applied to fabrics after weaving
- Wood finishing, the process of embellishing and/or protecting the surface
- Attendance at a finishing school
- Finishing, the act or skill of scoring in soccer
- Reaching orgasm during sexual intercourse or masturbation

== See also ==
- Finish (disambiguation)
