= In My City =

Single by Priyanka Chopra featuring will.i.am
- Released: 14 September 2012
- Recorded: 2012
- Genre: Dance-pop
- Length: 3:40
- Label: 2101; Interscope
- Songwriters: Brian Kennedy; Ester Dean; RedOne; Rush; Brett James; Dante Jones; will.i.am
- Producers: RedOne; Rush; Brian Kennedy

Priyanka Chopra singles chronology
| "In My City" (2012) | "Exotic" (2013) |

will.i.am singles chronology
| "Hall of Fame" (2012) | "In My City" (2012) | "Scream & Shout" (2012) |

"In My City" is the debut single by Indian recording artist and actress Priyanka Chopra, featuring American rapper will.i.am. The song was produced by RedOne, Rush and Brian Kennedy, and was co-written by Ester Dean, who provides additional vocals. The demo version of "In My City" was first played by will.i.am to Chopra, who was impressed with the track and decided to record it. The song is a homage to Chopra's nomadic childhood and journey from being a small-town girl to being a successful actor. "In My City" premiered on 13 September 2012, at the NFL Network's Thursday Night Football. The next day, the song was released for digital downloads to Nokia Music Store along with CD single.

"In My City" received mixed reviews from music critics; some complimented Chopra's vocals, while some criticised the generic sound of the song. In India, "In My City" was a commercial success. It sold 130,000 copies in its first week and was certified triple platinum by Indian Music Industry (IMI). The accompanying video for "In My City" was directed by Joseph Kahn and was released in January 2013.

== Writing and production ==
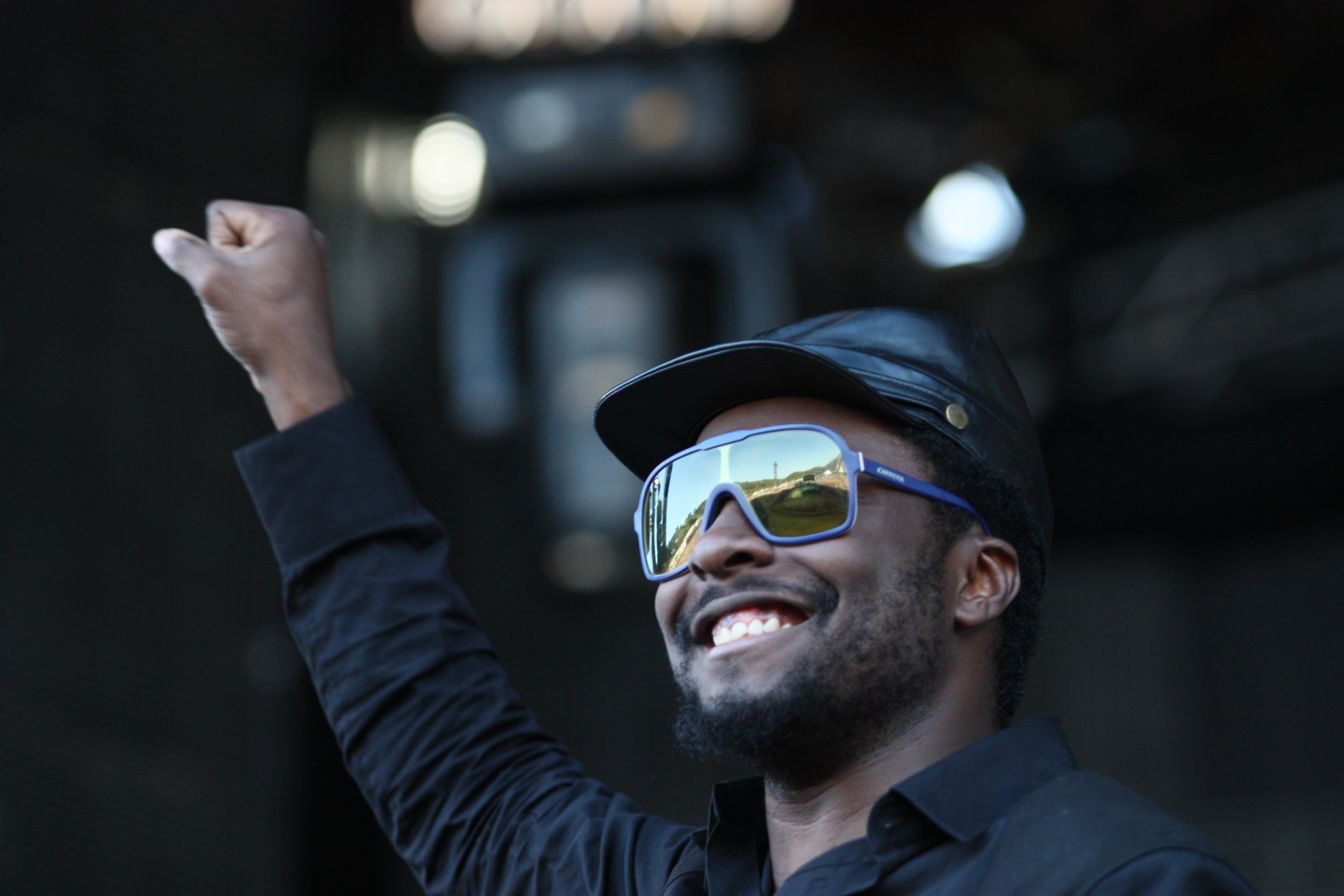
American rapper will.i.am was the featured artist on the single.

"In My City" was written by Brian Kennedy, Ester Dean, RedOne, Rush, Brett James, Dante Jones and will.i.am. RedOne also produced the track with producer Rush, and worked on the instrumentation and programming. American rapper will.i.am played Chopra a demo of "In My City" and advised her to record it. Chopra liked the song and decided to proceed with the recording.

Brian Kennedy assisted with the production, while Trevor Muzzy, will.i.am and Aubrey "Juice" Delaine engineered the track. The song was recorded at Chalice Recording Studios in Los Angeles, California, and mixed by Muzzy (mixing engineer) under RedOne Productions Ltd. Chopra and will.i.am were in the studios for two days while recording; Chopra said she poured her "blood and soul" into it. Gene Grimaldi mastered the track at Oasis Mastering Studios in Burbank, California. "In My City" also features background vocals from Dean, RedOne, Rush and Muzzy.

"In My City" talks about resonating with the party culture of urban cities. Chopra said that the song was not inspired by one city, since her father was an army doctor, and her family travelled all over India to cities like Jamshedpur, Lucknow, Delhi, Pune, Bareily, Chandigarh, Mumbai and Ladakh. Chopra told the Hindustan Times that the song was "about being proud of where I come from. It's inviting the world to my city and my city could be anywhere." The song pays homage to her nomadic childhood and her journey from being a small-town girl to being a successful actor.

== Release ==
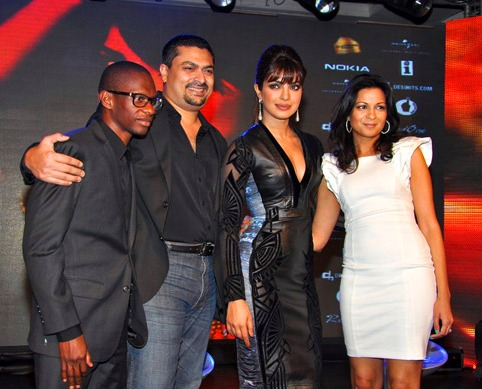
The release event for "In My City", from left: Troy Carter, Chopra and Anjula Acharia Bath, editor of DesiHits website.

"In My City" was released in India 12 hours before its US NFL launch because Chopra wanted her fans in India to hear it before the American release. A press release said that "Priyanka has always been very clear that India would hear her music first. So all plans have been worked out to ensure that. She will be in India for the launch when the song and special video will air during the TV telecast of NFL." The song was showcased in an event on 13 September in Mumbai, which was transmitted live on the YouTube and Bollywood Hungama websites.

"In My City" debuted on 13 September 2012, on the NFL Network's sports programme Thursday Night Football . Chopra filmed a video that aired every Thursday night before and after Thursday Night Football on the NFL Network. The day after the NFL launch, the song was released on CD single as well as for digital download in India.

Nokia provided exclusive downloads of the song and was chosen as a key feature for Blenders Pride Fashion Tour. "In My City" was released to the iTunes Store of the United States on 2 October 2012, for digital downloads. In an interview with The Economic Times, the singer expressed her nervousness about the single release, describing it as the culmination of a two-year journey which "has been the toughest yet most enriching experience of my life while also marking the beginning of an exciting new chapter."

== Critical reception ==
Hindustan Times writer Robin Bansal was impressed with the song, and called it "eclectic, peppy, and electrifying from the start... The song explodes after a point in its massiveness and stays in the head. The impeccable notes and pitch makes one wonder if it's really Priyanka." He added that the song had a high tempo and pitch, making it more like a track by The Black Eyed Peas. Chopra refuted the claims that her voice was digitally modulated, and said she has a high range in her voice, and that she always had an accent while speaking English. Perdy Mohindru from The Times of India described the lyrics as simple and beautiful, and complemented Chopra's accent and voice.

Neha Mujumdar of The Hindu was extremely disappointed with the track, calling it "musically generic" and "lyrically filled with platitudes". She gave a negative review of the production, and panned Chopra's "auto-tuned" vocals. Mujumdar wrote that will.I.am's rapping "does little to relieve the monotony; indeed, it manages to increase it, because of how predictable his exhortations are", and that apart fulfilling a desire for "the sort of over-produced music that typically fills up a fast-food chain store", the song is indistinguishable "from the large body of repetitive, unoriginal dance-pop". Writing for the US online news portal GlobalPost, Jason Overdorf did not agree with early reviews that said "In My City" sounded like the music of The Black Eyed Peas.

== Commercial performance ==
"In My City" was a commercial success in India, and reached number-one on the International downloads chart of Nokia Music Store India. The CD single debuted at the top of the pan-India Planet M and Music World retail chain charts. According to the Los Angeles Times, the single broke records by selling more than 130,000 copies within the first week of its release. The single was certified triple platinum by the Indian Music Industry (IMI). In the United States the single was unsuccessful, with 5,000 digital downloads in its first week on iTunes according to Nielsen SoundScan, and did not receive radio play.

Chopra expressed her amazement at the single's success in India. She said, "I am so overwhelmed! I can't even begin to explain what I'm feeling... it's so amazing that it's been just a few days since launch and my debut single is now number one on the charts. Thank you so much for the support and appreciation. This means the world to me." At the fourth Nokia Music Connect video conference, Chopra said that the commercial numbers for "In My City" were all the more surprising, since the music sales in the Indian market is not that much. Universal Music MD, India, Saarc Devraj Sanyal said that the label was surprised with the instant sales of the song. "We have been in the non-film music business for a while and I must admit to mounting engines across all platforms that have been fired like never before on Priyanka's global single debut. But to see these results so quickly is beyond gratifying," Sanyal said, before saying that the single debut would be followed by many promotional campaigns targeting different multimedia facets.

== Promotions ==
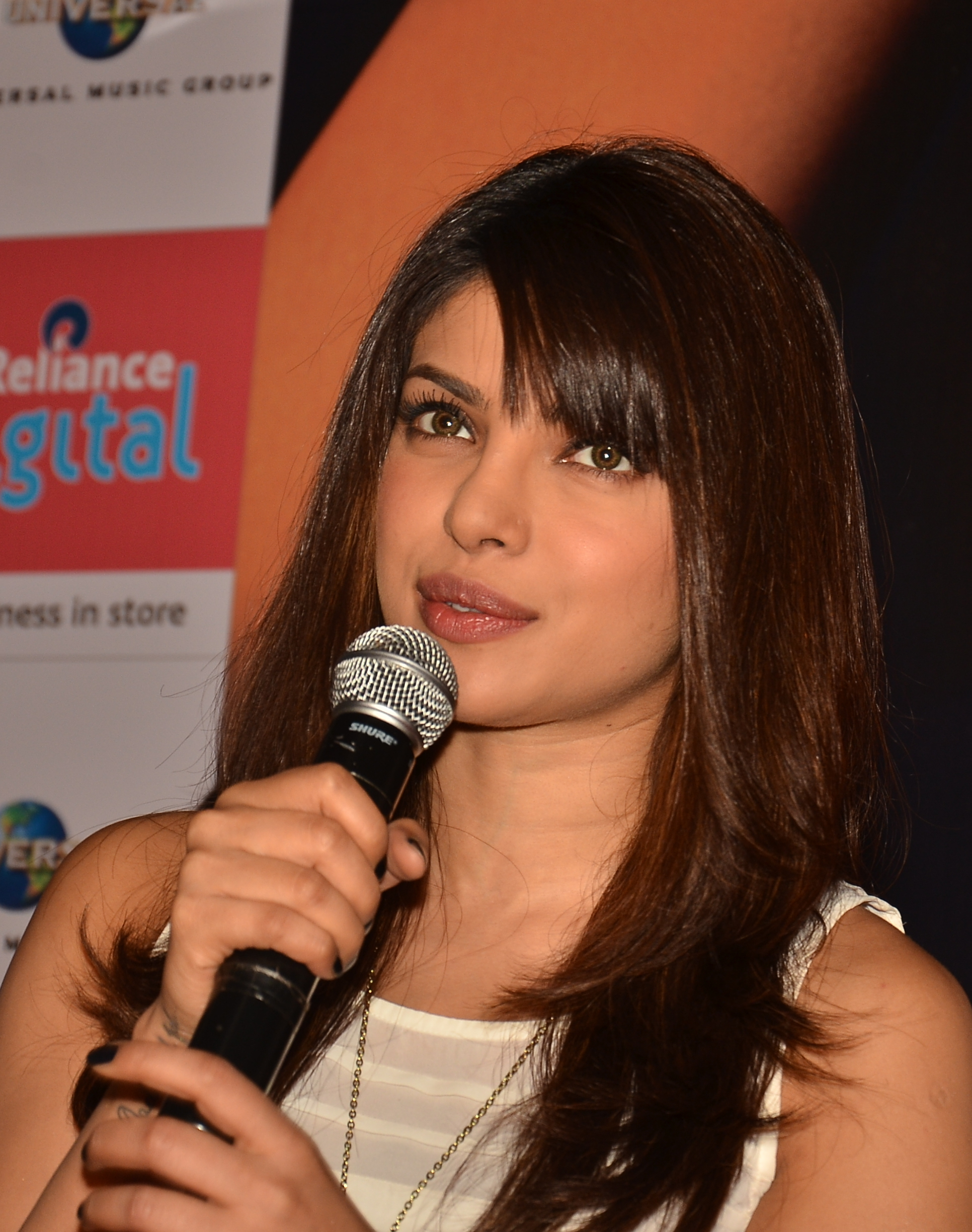
Chopra promoting "In My City" at the Reliance Digital store in Malad, Mumbai

"In My City" was first promoted during a TV spot for the NFL Network's "Thursday Night Football" show, where the single was the music bed. The single was played every Thursday in pre-game shows and began on 13 September. A different promo aired every week with Chopra wearing jerseys of each of the two teams playing that week. Chopra also said that 33 different looks were designed for the commercial based on the teams.

The single was also promoted at Blenders Pride Fashion Tour in cities across India, and was used as the anthem for the tour. On 26 October 2012, Chopra promoted "In My City" by DJing in four clubs in the National Capital Region, including Hard Rock Cafe and Buzz in Delhi, and Striker and Seven Degrees in Gurgaon. Chopra mingled with the crowd as she MCed and DJed, followed by playing her single. In Bangalore, Chopra visited several clubs with DJ Nash to promote "In My City". At a Reliance Digital store in Mumbai, Chopra spent time with autistic children and played her song to them. The event was broadcast live on YouTube and on screens in Reliance Digital stores across India.

== Music video ==
A promotional video documenting the recording of "In My City" debuted during an NFL game on 13 September 2012. Later, Chopra posted on her Twitter account that she was in Los Angeles to shoot an official music video for the track. The video, directed by Joseph Kahn, was released on 29 January 2013.

The video begins with Chopra coming out of a BMW and sending a message with her cellphone to her friends. They all get it, and join her in dancing the song. In the middle, there is an Indian-African influenced drum beat with elaborate choreography. The song continues with more dancing, until it ends with Chopra and all her friends laughing.

== In popular culture ==
- "In My City" was played on 8 May 2013 broadcast of American Idol during a clip when the Top 3 visit their home towns.
- "In My City" was selected as the theme song for 2013 season of the NFL' network Thursday Night Football.
- "In My City" was selected as the theme song for the 2016 Centennial Cup America.

== Track listings and formats ==
- Digital Download / CD single
1. "In My City" (feat. will.i.am) – 3:40
- Digital Remixes EP
1. "In My City" (R3hab and ZROQ remix) – 3:54
2. "In My City" (Maestro remix) – 5:57
3. "In My City" (LA Riots remix) – 5:28
4. "In My City" (Mr. Morris remix) – 3:12
5. "In My City" (Wideboys remix) – 6:34
6. "In My City" (ANSOL remix) – 5:32
7. "In My City" (DesiHits Rishi Rich remix) – 3:58

== Credits and personnel ==
Credits are adapted from the liner notes of the CD single.

- Priyanka Chopra – lead vocals
- will.i.am – guest vocals, engineer, songwriter
- RedOne – producer, writer, background vocals, instrumentation, executive producer
- Ester Dean – writer, background vocals
- Rush – producer, background vocals, instrumentation, songwriter
- Brian Kennedy – producer, songwriter
- Brett James – writer
- Trevor Muzzy – mixing, engineer, background vocals
- Dante Jones – writer
- Gene Grimaldi – mastering at Oasis Mastering Studios, Los Angeles, California
- Aubry "Juice" Delalne – engineer
- Julian Peploe – art direction, design
- Stevie and Mada – photography
- Anjula Acharia-Bath – executive producer
- Jimmy Iovine – executive producer
- Troy Carter – management
- Richy Jackson – choreographer

== Certifications ==
| Country | Provider | Certification |
|---|---|---|
| India | Indian Music Industry (IMI) | 3× Platinum |

== Release history ==
| Country | Date | Format | Label |
|---|---|---|---|
| India | 14 September 2012 | Digital download | Universal Music India |
| India | 14 September 2012 | CD single | Universal Music India |
| United States | 2 October 2012 | Digital download | Interscope Records |
| United States | 11 December 2012 | Digital download – Remixes | Interscope Records |

== Accolades ==
| Award | Category | Nominee | Result | Ref |
|---|---|---|---|---|
| 5th Mirchi Music Awards | Indie Pop Song of the Year | - | Nominated | |
