= Finish =

Finish may refer to:

- Finishing (whisky), in the distillation of Scotch
- The aftertaste of an alcoholic beverage, particularly for:
  - wine
- Finished good, a good that is completed as to manufacturing but not yet sold or distributed to the end-user
- Surface finishing, various industrial processes for modifying a workpiece's surface
  - Mechanical finish, processes that modify a surface using mechanical means
- Wood finishing, the process of embellishing and/or protecting the surface of wooden objects

== People ==
- Eli Finish (born 1975), Israeli comedian

== Brands ==
- Finish, A dishwasher detergent brand owned by Reckitt and known as Calgonit in Continental Europe, formerly known as Electrasol.

== See also ==
- Finishing (disambiguation)
- Finish line (disambiguation)
- Finnish (disambiguation)
