= Exotic (Priyanka Chopra song) =

2013 single by Priyanka Chopra featuring Pitbull

Single by Priyanka Chopra featuring Pitbull
- Released: 9 July 2013
- Recorded: 2013
- Genre: Dance-pop
- Length: 4:06
- Label: Interscope; 2101; DesiHits
- Songwriters: Pitbull; Priyanka Chopra; RedOne
- Producer: RedOne

Priyanka Chopra singles chronology
"In My City" (2012)	"Exotic" (2013)	"I Can't Make You Love Me" (2014)

Pitbull singles chronology
"Habibi I Love You" (2013)	"Exotic" (2013)	"Can't Believe It" (2013)

"Exotic" is the second single by Indian recording artist Priyanka Chopra, featuring American rapper Pitbull. The song was released as a single by Interscope Records on July 9, 2013. "Exotic" was written by Chopra, Pitbull and RedOne, who also produced the song. It contains both English and Hindi lyrics.

The single debuted and peaked on Billboard's Hot Dance Club Songs at No. 12 and on Dance/Electronic Digital Songs at No. 16. The single also debuted and peaked on the Canadian Hot 100 at No. 74. The song was selected as the official theme song of Guinness International Champion Cup 2013. The accompanying music video for "Exotic" was filmed in Miami and was released on July 11, 2013.

== Background and composition ==
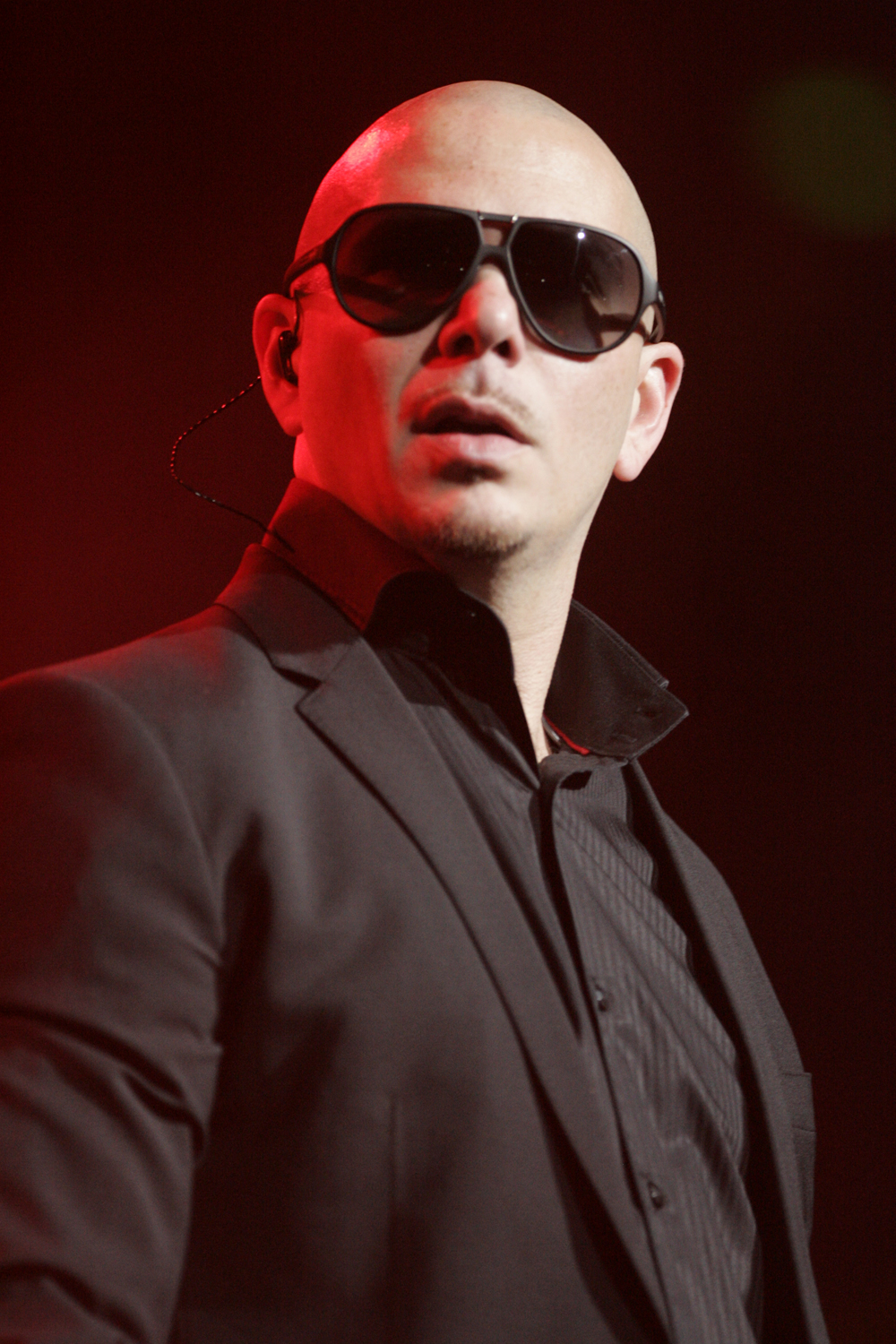
Pitbull is featured in "Exotic" and co-wrote the song.

"Exotic" was written by Pitbull, Chopra and RedOne and produced by RedOne. The song contains both English and Hindi lyrics. Chopra spoke to The Hollywood Reporter about the song's composition and about the inclusion of Hindi language lyrics: "My upcoming album is in English and 'Exotic' was initially going to be in English too. But in all my tracks I want to have some aspect of my Indian identity. 'In My City' has some Indian instrumentation to give it flavour. For me, being Indian is very exotic. After Pitbull sent me his lyrics I suggested to 'Exotic' producer RedOne that we could consider having some Hindi lyrics. He said, 'Yeah, let's try that'—and I quickly wrote the lyrics and sang it and he loved it. As I said, this is a summer song and we have so much fun in our Hindi movies and songs. We Indians really know how to party, man! And the world needs to see that. So the video has Indian-inspired dance steps too. It has a mix of Hindi and English, since the world is so global. An all-Korean song topped the Billboard charts, so why not a Hindi song?" Chopra also commented on her collaboration with Pitbull: "Working with Pitbull was great—he is hugely creative. The lyrics he wrote are so personal, and he made the song about me and us. He made it real and I loved it. We only met during the shooting of the video and after that we have been in touch. I had a great time during the video shoot, which was all laughter and jokes. He was great fun and I was pleasantly surprised." "Exotic" is written in the initial key of D minor.

== Reception ==
=== Critical response ===
Amy Sciarretto from 105.7 FM ("PopCrush 105.7") generally gave the song a positive review ahead of the release of the music video, saying "[the song] has quite the Indian flair and flavor, something the singer [Chopra] wanted to celebrate."

=== Chart performance ===
"Exotic" was released on 9 July 2013. "Exotic" debuted at No. 16 on Billboard's Dance/Electronic Songs chart and No. 11 on the Dance/Electronic Digital Songs chart in the 27 July 2013 issue, but failed to chart on the Hot 100. The single also debuted at No. 74 on the Canadian Hot 100. "Exotic" has witnessed over 300,000 cumulative physical plus digital sales in India.

== Music video ==
=== Synopsis ===
The music video showcases elements of Indian culture such as the thumka dance, as shown, and yoga.

Shot in South Beach, Miami, the accompanying music video for "Exotic", directed by Emil Nava, shows Chopra wearing a monokini in the ocean as well as scenes with Pitbull filmed in a mansion and outdoor scenes in a forest. Chopra spoke to The Hollywood Reporter about the music video for "Exotic," saying: "It's exotic! According to me, exotic is beaches and sun and dancing. It's a summer song, a summer anthem. It's really about feeling hot and sexy. I am from Mumbai; Pitbull is from Cuba -- and we meet in Miami." In an interview with Katie Van Buren of Fuse on 15 August 2013, Chopra showed how to do some of the Bollywood-inspired dance moves that are featured in the music video, including the thumka and Bollywood-inspired hand motions. Chopra jokingly called this move "the Priyanka", commenting "it's not narcissistic at all!" Writer Jeff Benjamin from Fuse commented, "the accompanying music video features Chopra busting out super-sexy Indian dance moves" and concluded, "it's all about the hips."

=== Reception ===
"Thank you all for your support and love. 30 million views is overwhelming. Yay."

—Priyanka Chopra posting to Twitter, thanking her fans for the success of the music video for "Exotic" on YouTube/Vevo.

Amy Sciarretto from 105.7 FM ("PopCrush 105.7") gave the video a more positive review, commenting that Chopra looks "breathtakingly hot in a nude-hued bathing suit" as she "whips her soaking wet hair back and forth and gives off a smoldering stare". Sciarretto also comments that "watching her cool off by taking a dip in the water will certainly make the viewer work up a sweat". As of now, the music video has acquired over 269 million views.

== Track listing and formats ==
CD single

1. "Exotic" – 4:06
2. "Exotic" (Moto Blanco remix) – 6:40
3. "Exotic" (Cahill radio remix) – 3:27

Digital download

1. "Exotic" (featuring Pitbull) – 4:06

Remixes

1. "Exotic" (featuring Pitbull) [Popeska remix] - 4:36
2. "Exotic" (featuring Pitbull) [La'Reda remix] - 4:43
3. "Exotic" (featuring Pitbull) [Hardstorm remix] - 5:19
4. "Exotic" (featuring Pitbull) [Aylen remix] - 2:55
5. "Exotic" (featuring Pitbull) [Cahill Club remix] - 6:16
6. "Exotic" (featuring Pitbull) [Moto Blanco remix] - 6:40

== Credits and personnel ==
Credits adapted from the single's official liner notes.

- Pitbull – vocals, songwriter
- Priyanka Chopra – vocals, songwriter
- RedOne – record producer, songwriter

== Charts ==
=== Weekly charts ===
Chart (2013)	Peak position
Canada Hot 100 (Billboard)	74
Suriname (Nationale Top 40)	9
Turkey (Number One Top 20)	19
US Dance Club Songs (Billboard)	12
US Hot Dance/Electronic Songs (Billboard)	16

=== Year-end charts ===
Chart (2013)	Position
US Hot Dance/Electronic Songs (Billboard)	55

== Release history ==
Region	Date	Format
United States	9 July 2013	CD single, digital download
