= List of A Certain Scientific Railgun episodes =

Limited edition cover for the first home media volume of the series, illustrated by Motoi Fuyukawa and released by Geneon Entertainment, featuring Kuroko Shirai (L) and Mikoto Misaka (R)

A Certain Scientific Railgun is an anime television series based on the manga series of the same name, which in itself is a spin-off to Kazuma Kamachi's light novel series A Certain Magical Index. The manga is serialized in Dengeki Daioh and is written by Kazuma Kamachi and illustrated by Motoi Fuyukawa. The series is set in Academy City before and during the events of A Certain Magical Index, in which the plot focuses on Mikoto Misaka, an electromaster who is the third strongest esper in Academy City, along with her friends: Kuroko Shirai, a teleporter and Mikoto's roommate; Kazari Uiharu, Kuroko's partner in Judgment, the city's public safety committee; and Ruiko Saten, Kazari's friend and classmate.

The anime series is produced by J.C.Staff and directed by Tatsuyuki Nagai, with series composition by Seishi Minakami, music by Maiko Iuchi, character design by Yuichi Tanaka and art and sound direction by Tomonori Kuroda and Jin Aketagawa respectively. The first season began airing on Tokyo MX from October 3, 2009, to March 20, 2010, and were later aired days later on Chiba Television Broadcasting, Mainichi Broadcasting System, Television Saitama and Television Kanagawa. (Note: Tokyo MX lists the series premiere as October 2 at 26:30, which is effectively October 3 at 2:30 a.m. JST. After the first episode, the season aired an hour earlier at 25:30 (1:30 a.m. JST).) The first twelve episodes of the series closely follow the manga its based on, with a few changes and several anime-original episodes and characters, while the second half of the first season is an entirely original plot written by Kazuma Kamachi. The season released on eight home media volumes, containing three episodes each and a mini A Certain Magical Index novel written by Kazuma Kamachi and illustrated by Haimura Kiyotaka which features Kaori Kanzaki as the protagonist, were released since February 7, 2010. A five-minute bonus animation was included with the official visual book of the series, which released on July 24, 2010. An original video animation (OVA) was released shortly thereafter on October 29, 2010. Funimation licensed the series in North America and released the season on home media in April 2013. A second season, titled A Certain Scientific Railgun S, aired from April 12 to September 27, 2013, and was simulcast by Funimation, who released the season on home media between July and August 2014. Another visual book containing another bonus animation was released on March 27, 2014. A third season, titled A Certain Scientific Railgun T, aired from January 10 to September 25, 2020. A fourth season was announced during the Dengeki Bunko Winter Festival 2025 livestream event held on February 16, 2025.

== Series overview ==
Season	Episodes	Originally released		
Season	Episodes	First released	Last released	Network
1	24	October 3, 2009	March 20, 2010	Tokyo MX
2	24	April 12, 2013	September 27, 2013	AT-X
3	25	January 10, 2020	September 25, 2020	AT-X

== Episodes ==
=== Season 1 (2009–10) ===
No. overall	No. in season	Title	Directed by	Written by	Storyboarded by	Original release date
1	1	"Electromaster"; Transliteration: "Erekutoromasutā" (Japanese: 電撃使い(エレクトロマスター))	Tatsuyuki Nagai	Seishi Minakami	Tatsuyuki Nagai	October 3, 2009
2	2	"When Working Under a Hot Sun, Rehydration Is Essential"; Transliteration: "Entenka no Sagyō ni wa Suibun Hokyū ga Hissu desu no yo" (Japanese: 炎天下の作業には水分補給が必須ですのよ)	Tamaki Nakatsu	Hiroshi Ōnogi & Seishi Minakami	Tamaki Nakatsu	October 10, 2009
3	3	"Tokiwadai Is Targeted"; Transliteration: "Nerawareta Tokiwadai" (Japanese: ねらわれた常盤台)	Takashi Kawabata	Kurasumi Sunayama	Tetsuya Yanagisawa (Note: Credited as Sōma Ōgami)	October 17, 2009
4	4	"Urban Legends"; Transliteration: "Toshi Densetsu" (Japanese: 都市伝説)	Hideki Tachibana	Miya Asakawa	Hideki Tachibana	October 24, 2009
5	5	"A Certain Pair of New Trainees"; Transliteration: "Toaru Futari no Shinjin Kenshū" (Japanese: とある二人の新人研修)	Tomohiro Kamitani	Nobuhiko Tenkawa	Tomohiro Kamitani	October 31, 2009
6	6	"Everyone Is Proactive When It Comes to This"; Transliteration: "Kō Iu Koto ni wa Minna Sekkyokuteki Nan desu yo" (Japanese: こういうことにはみんな積極的なんですよ)	Toshio Ishikawa	Mariko Kunisawa	Yūichi Nihei	November 7, 2009
7	7	"Abilities and Powers"; Transliteration: "Nōryoku to Chikara" (Japanese: 能力とちから)	Kenichi Yatagai	Michiko Itō	Kenichi Yatagai	November 14, 2009
8	8	"Level Upper"; Transliteration: "Reberu Appā" (Japanese: 幻想御手(レベルアッパー))	Makoto Sokuza	Nobuhiko Tenkawa	Masayuki Miyaji (Note: Credited as Sakomi Yajima)	November 21, 2009
9	9	"Majority Report"; Transliteration: "Majoriti・Ripōto" (Japanese: マジョリティ・リポート)	Shigeyasu Yamauchi	Hiroshi Ōnogi	Shigeyasu Yamauchi	November 28, 2009
10	10	"Silent Majority"; Transliteration: "Sairento・Majoriti" (Japanese: サイレント・マジョリティ)	Daisuke Takashima	Hiroshi Ōnogi	Tsuneo Kobayashi	December 5, 2009
11	11	"Dr. Kiyama"; Transliteration: "Kiyama-sensei" (Japanese: 木山せんせい)	Kei Umabiki	Kurasumi Sunayama	Yūichi Nihei	December 12, 2009
12	12	"AIM Burst"; Transliteration: "ĒMU Bāsuto" (Japanese: AIMバースト)	Hideki Tachibana	Seishi Minakami	Michio Fukuda	December 19, 2009
13	13	"A Bikini Divides the Eyeline Between Top and Bottom, but a One-Piece Shows off the Figure, so They Only Flatter the Slender"; Transliteration: "Bikini wa Mesen ga Jōge ni Wakaremasu kedo Wanpīsu wa Karada no Rain ga Demasu kara Hosoi Kata Shika Niawanain desu yo" (Japanese: ビキニは目線が上下に分かれますけどワンピースは身体のラインが出ますから細い方しか似合わないんですよ)	Tomohiro Kamitani	Michiko Itō	Tamaki Nakatsu	December 26, 2009
14	14	"Special Workshop"; Transliteration: "Tokubetsu Kōshū" (Japanese: 特別講習)	Takashi Kawabata	Miya Asakawa	Masayuki Miyaji	January 9, 2010
15	15	"Skill Out"; Transliteration: "Sukiru Auto" (Japanese: スキルアウト)	Makoto Sokuza	Hiroshi Ōnogi	Yūichi Nihei	January 16, 2010
16	16	"Academy City"; Transliteration: "Gakuen-toshi" (Japanese: 学園都市)	Daisuke Takashima	Hiroshi Ōnogi	Yūichi Nihei	January 23, 2010
17	17	"Tsuzuri's Summer Vacation"; Transliteration: "Natsuyasumi no Tsuzuri" (Japanese: 夏休みのつづり)	Kei Umabiki	Kurasumi Sunayama	Masato Suma	January 30, 2010
18	18	"Asunaro Park"; Transliteration: "Asunaro-en" (Japanese: あすなろ園)	Yoshitaka Koyama	Mariko Kunisawa	Yoshitaka Koyama	February 6, 2010
19	19	"Midsummer Festival"; Transliteration: "Seika-sai" (Japanese: 盛夏祭)	Hideki Tachibana	Nobuhiko Tenkawa	Hideki Tachibana	February 13, 2010
20	20	"Poltergeist"; Transliteration: "Porutāgaisuto" (Japanese: 乱雑開放(ポルターガイスト))	Masato Jinbo	Miya Asakawa	Yūichi Nihei	February 20, 2010
21	21	"Voices"; Transliteration: "Koe" (Japanese: 声)	Tomohiro Kamitani	Seishi Minakami	Tomohiro Kamitani	February 27, 2010
22	22	"Level 6 (The One Who Obtains the Power of God Whilst Still Possessing a Mortal Body)"; Transliteration: "Reberu Shikkusu (Kami Naranu Mi ni te Tenjō no Ishi ni Tadoritsuku Mono)" (Japanese: レベル6(神ならぬ身にて天上の意志に辿り着くもの))	Ken'ichi Kasai	Kurasumi Sunayama	Masato Suma & Yūichi Nihei	March 6, 2010
23	23	"What Is It You See in Your Eyes Right Now?"; Transliteration: "Ima, Anata no Me ni wa Nani ga Mietemasu ka?" (Japanese: いま、あなたの目には何が見えてますか?)	Daisuke Takashima	Miya Asakawa	Naoto Hosoda	March 13, 2010
24	24	"Dear My Friends"	Tatsuyuki Nagai	Seishi Minakami	Tatsuyuki Nagai	March 20, 2010

=== Season 2: S (2013) ===
No. overall	No. in season	Title	Directed by	Written by	Storyboarded by	Original release date
25	1	"Railgun"; Transliteration: "Rērugan" (Japanese: 超電磁砲(レールガン))	Tatsuyuki Nagai	Seishi Minakami	Tatsuyuki Nagai	April 12, 2013
26	2	"Critical"; Transliteration: "Kuritikaru" (Japanese: 寿命中断(クリティカル))	Daisuke Takashima	Seishi Minakami	Shigehito Takayanagi	April 19, 2013
27	3	"Project Radio Noise"; Transliteration: "Redio Noizu Keikaku" (Japanese: 超電磁砲量産計画(レディオノイズけいかく))	Masahiro Sonoda	Seishi Minakami	Yūichi Nihei	April 26, 2013
28	4	"Sisters"; Transliteration: "Shisutāzu" (Japanese: 妹達(シスターズ))	Katsushi Sakurabi	Kurasumi Sunayama	Yasuo Muroi	May 3, 2013
29	5	"Project Level 6 Shift"; Transliteration: "Reberu Shikkusu Shifuto Keikaku" (Japanese: 絶対能力進化計画(レベル6シフトけいかく))	Daisuke Takashima	Seishi Minakami	Yūichi Nihei	May 10, 2013
30	6	"I... Can See All of You"; Transliteration: "Atashi... Minna no Koto Mieteru kara" (Japanese: あたし...みんなのこと見えてるから)	Kazuhiko Ishii	Seishi Minakami	Michio Fukuda	May 17, 2013
31	7	"I... I Want to Be of Help to You, Sissy"; Transliteration: "Onee-sama no Chikara ni Naritai desu no" (Japanese: お姉さまの力になりたいですの)	Kouhei Hatano	Yasunori Yamada	Shigehito Takayanagi	May 24, 2013
32	8	"ITEM"; Transliteration: "Aitemu" (Japanese: Item(アイテム))	Katsushi Sakurabi	Jukki Hanada	Yasuo Muroi	May 31, 2013
33	9	"AIM Stalker"; Transliteration: "ĒMU Sutōkā" (Japanese: 能力追跡(AIMストーカー))	Naoyuki Konno	Yasunori Yamada	Naoyuki Konno	June 7, 2013
34	10	"Meltdowner"; Transliteration: "Merutodaunā" (Japanese: 原子崩し(メルトダウナー))	Takashi Ikehata	Michihiro Tsuchiya	Yūichi Nihei	June 14, 2013
35	11	"The Vending Machine"; Transliteration: "Jidō Hanbaiki" (Japanese: 自動販売機)	Kazuhiko Ishii	Kurasumi Sunayama	Tatsuyuki Nagai	June 21, 2013
36	12	"Tree Diagram"; Transliteration: "Tsurī Daiaguramu" (Japanese: 樹形図の設計者(ツリーダイアグラム))	Masahiro Sonoda	Jukki Hanada	Yūichi Nihei	June 28, 2013
37	13	"Accelerator"; Transliteration: "Akuserarēta" (Japanese: 一方通行(アクセラレータ))	Kensuke Ishikawa	Michihiro Tsuchiya	Kensuke Ishikawa	July 5, 2013
38	14	"The Promise"; Transliteration: "Yakusoku" (Japanese: 約束)	Daisuke Takashima	Jukki Hanada	Kiyoko Sayama	July 12, 2013
39	15	"Kamijo Toma" (Japanese: 最弱(かみじょうとうま))	Katsushi Sakurabi	Kurasumi Sunayama	Satoshi Iwataki	July 19, 2013
40	16	"Sisterhood"; Transliteration: "Shimai" (Japanese: 姉妹)	Ken'ichi Kasai	Yasunori Yamada	Yoshimitsu Ohashi	July 26, 2013
41	17	"Study Group"; Transliteration: "Benkyō-kai" (Japanese: 勉強会)	Takashi Ikehata	Michihiro Tsuchiya	Kiyoko Sayama	August 2, 2013
42	18	"Moving"; Transliteration: "O Hikkoshi" (Japanese: お引越し)	Daisuke Takashima	Kurasumi Sunayama	Yūichi Nihei	August 16, 2013 (Note: A 22-minute preview of A Certain Magical Index: The Movie – The Miracle of Endymion aired on August 9, 2013, in place of episode 43)
43	19	"Academy City Research Exhibit Assembly"; Transliteration: "Gakuen-toshi Kenkyū Happyōkai" (Japanese: 学園都市研究発表会)	Keiji Gotoh	Hiroyuki Yoshino	Keiji Gotoh	August 23, 2013
44	20	"Febri"; Transliteration: "Feburi" (Japanese: フェブリ)	Yōhei Suzuki	Yasunori Yamada	Kiyoko Sayama	August 30, 2013
45	21	"Darkness"; Transliteration: "Yami" (Japanese: 闇)	Katsushi Sakurabi	Michihiro Tsuchiya	Yūichi Nihei	September 6, 2013
46	22	"STUDY"	Daisuke Takashima	Michihiro Tsuchiya	Kiyoko Sayama	September 13, 2013
47	23	"Dawn of a Revolution (Silent Party)"; Transliteration: "Kakumei Mimei (Sairento Pātī)" (Japanese: 革命未明(Silent Party))	Takashi Ikehata	Hiroyuki Yoshino	Yoshimitsu Ohashi & Yūichi Nihei	September 20, 2013
48	24	"Eternal Party"	Tatsuyuki Nagai & Naoyuki Konno	Hiroyuki Yoshino	Tatsuyuki Nagai & Naoyuki Konno	September 27, 2013

=== Season 3: T (2020) ===
No. overall	No. in season	Title	Directed by	Written by	Storyboarded by	Original release date
49	1	"Super-Powered (Level 5)"; Transliteration: "Chō Nōryoku-sha (Reberu Faibu)" (Japanese: 超能力者(レベル5))	Kazuki Horiguchi	Shōgo Yasukawa	Tatsuyuki Nagai	January 10, 2020
50	2	"The Daihasei Festival"; Transliteration: "Daihasei-sai" (Japanese: 大覇星祭)	Yoshihiro Mori	Shōgo Yasukawa	Yūichi Nihei	January 17, 2020
51	3	"Balloon Hunter"; Transliteration: "Barūn Hantā" (Japanese: バルーンハンター)	Yūsuke Onoda	Shōgo Yasukawa	Shingo Yuki	January 24, 2020
52	4	"Tampering"; Transliteration: "Kaizan" (Japanese: 改竄)	Makoto Sokuza	Shōgo Yasukawa	N/A	January 31, 2020
53	5	"Trust"; Transliteration: "Shinrai" (Japanese: 信頼)	Toshikazu Hashimoto	Atsuo Ishino	Toshikazu Hashimoto	February 7, 2020
54	6	"The Battle Begins"; Transliteration: "Kaisen" (Japanese: 開戦)	Kōsaku Taniguchi & Yūsuke Onoda	Hiroki Uchida	Kōichirō Sohtome & Tatsuyuki Nagai	February 14, 2020
55	7	"Auribus oculi fideliores sunt. (The eyes are more trustworthy than the ears)" Transliteration: "Ōribazu okarī fideriarezu santo. (Miru koto wa kiku koto yori shinjiru ni ataisuru)" (Japanese: Auribus oculi fideliores sunt.(見ることは聞くことより信じるに値する))	Yoshihiro Mori	Shinichi Inotsume	Yūichi Nihei	February 28, 2020 (Note: This episode was delayed from its original scheduled airing date of February 21, 2020, due to the COVID-19 pandemic. Subsequent episodes would be delayed by another two weeks.)
56	8	"Railgun × Mental Out"; Transliteration: "Rērugan × Mentaru Auto" (Japanese: 超電磁砲(レールガン)×心理掌握(メンタルアウト))	Makoto Sokuza	Shōgo Yasukawa	Kouichi Takada	March 20, 2020
57	9	"Kōzaku Mitori" (Japanese: 警策看取(こうざくみとり))	Ryūta Kawahara	Shōgo Yasukawa	Ryūta Kawahara	March 27, 2020
58	10	"Clone Dolly"; Transliteration: "Kurōn Dorī" (Japanese: 才人工房(クローンドリー))	Yuuki Nagasawa & Takayuki Kuriyama	Shinichi Inotsume	Yūichi Nihei	April 3, 2020
59	11	"Joining the Battle"; Transliteration: "Sansen" (Japanese: 参戦)	Yōsuke Yamamoto	Atsuo Ishino	Hideki Tachibana & Kazuki Horiguchi	April 10, 2020
60	12	"Exterior"; Transliteration: "Ekusuteria" (Japanese: 外装代脳(エクステリア))	Yoshihiro Mori	Hiroki Uchida	Hideki Tachibana & Tetsuya Yanagisawa	April 17, 2020
61	13	"SYSTEM (Those Who Arrive at Heaven's Will in an Only Human Body)"; Transliteration: "SHISUTEMU (Kaminaranumi nite Tenjō no Ishi ni Tadoritsuku Mono)" (Japanese: SYSTEM(神ならぬ身にて天上の意志に辿り着くもの))	Daizou Yase & Akari Ranzaki	Shōgo Yasukawa	Kazuo Takigawa, Kōichirō Sohtome & Tatsuyuki Nagai	May 1, 2020 (Note: This episode was delayed from its original scheduled airing date of April 24, 2020, due to the COVID-19 pandemic)
62	14	"Dragon Strike (Jaw of the Dragon King)"; Transliteration: "Doragon Sutoraiku (Ryūō no Ago)" (Japanese: 竜王の顎(ドラゴンストライク))	Shuuji Miyazaki	Shōgo Yasukawa	Hideki Tachibana	May 15, 2020 (Note: This episode was delayed from its original scheduled airing date of May 8, 2020, due to the COVID-19 pandemic)
63	15	"Promise"; Transliteration: "Yakusoku" (Japanese: やくそく)	Kiyoko Sayama	Shōgo Yasukawa	Kiyoko Sayama	May 22, 2020
64	16	"Dream Ranker"; Transliteration: "Dorīmu Rankā" (Japanese: 天賦夢路(ドリームランカー))	Kazuki Horiguchi & Makoto Sokuza	Shinichi Inotsume	Kazuki Horiguchi	July 24, 2020 (Note: This episode was delayed from its original scheduled airing date of May 29, 2020, due to the COVID-19 pandemic)
65	17	"Precognition"; Transliteration: "Yochi" (Japanese: 予知)	Yoshihiro Mori	Shinichi Inotsume	Yūichi Nihei	July 31, 2020
66	18	"Bust Upper"; Transliteration: "Basuto Appā" (Japanese: 巨乳御手(バストアッパー))	Sho Kitamura	Shōgo Yasukawa	Yoshiki Yamakawa	August 7, 2020
67	19	"Strange Coincidence"; Transliteration: "Kien" (Japanese: 奇縁)	Akari Ranzaki	Shōgo Yasukawa	Kouichi Takada	August 14, 2020
68	20	"Ha det bra"	Makoto Sokuza, Takayuki Kuriyama & Yuuki Nagasawa	Hiroki Uchida	Yūichi Nihei	August 21, 2020
69	21	"Doppelganger"; Transliteration: "Dopperugengā" (Japanese: ドッペルゲンガー)	Shuuji Miyazaki	Shinichi Inotsume	Shuuji Miyazaki	August 28, 2020
70	22	"Scavenger"; Transliteration: "Sukabenjā" (Japanese: 屍喰部隊(スカベンジャー))	Katsushi Sakurabi	Shinichi Inotsume	Yoshimitsu Ohashi	September 4, 2020
71	23	"Possession"; Transliteration: "Hyōi" (Japanese: 憑依)	Makoto Sokuza, Kazuki Horiguchi & Tetsuro Tanaka	Shōgo Yasukawa	Kouichi Takada, Tōru Yoshida & Tatsuyuki Nagai	September 11, 2020
72	24	"Diffusion"; Transliteration: "Kakusan" (Japanese: 拡散)	Tetsuro Tanaka, Akari Ranzaki, & Yoshihiro Mori	Shōgo Yasukawa	Takashi Iida & Tatsuyuki Nagai	September 18, 2020
73	25	"My Dear Friends"; Transliteration: "Watashi no, Taisetsu na Tomodachi" (Japanese: 私の、大切な友達)	Tatsuyuki Nagai	Shōgo Yasukawa	Tatsuyuki Nagai	September 25, 2020

== OVAs ==
No.	Title	Directed by (Note: Production staff information is taken from the ending credits of each OVA / short)	Written by	Chief animation directed by	Original release date
13' (Note: Although effectively an OVA, its official listing designation is the "13'th episode" of the series)	"Being a Photo Shoot Model Under the Sun Isn't Easy, You Know."; Transliteration: "Entenka no Satsuei Moderu mo Raku Ja Arimasen wa ne." (Japanese: 炎天下の撮影モデルも楽じゃありませんわね。)	Masato Jinbo	Shōgo Yasukawa	Naoto Nakamura	July 24, 2010
During the photo shoot, Kuroko attempts to seduce Mikoto by swapping a suntan lotion Kazari was rubbing on her with one filled with aphrodisiacs. However, her plan backfires when Ruiko takes Mikoto's place, leading her to become aroused instead and lecherously chase after Kazari. Mikoto discovers that Kuroko is the culprit and punishes her, and when the four of them return, they find Mitsuko had accidentally used Kuroko's lotion on her pet snake.
1	"Since Misaka-san Is the Center of Attention Right Now..."; Transliteration: "Misaka-san wa Ima Chūmoku no Mato desukara" (Japanese: 御坂さんはいま注目の的ですから)	Directed by : Daisuke Takashima; Storyboarded by : Tatsuyuki Nagai	Seishi Minakami	Naoto Nakamura	October 29, 2010
One day, shortly following the events of the Level Upper incident, Mikoto starts to feel an eerie feeling like someone is stalking her. As Mikoto continues to feel this discomforting sensation everywhere, she starts to become very paranoid and afraid. Looking into a related rumor, Kuroko and the others learn other students have also been experiencing the same sensation. While Ruiko and Konori take Mikoto to the public bath, where Ruiko gives her some encouragement, Kuroko and Kazari interview Mitsuko, Maaya and Kinuho, whose senior is also one of the victims. Thanks to Ruiko's advice and Kuroko's research, Mikoto finds the culprit behind the sensations to be Asako Jonan, an Anti-Skill officer and former Nagatenjōki Academy teacher. Having been fired from her teaching job, supposedly due to not being able to produce any Level 5 espers, Asako blamed Tokiwadai and used a device to produce special electromagnetic waves and cause discomfort in electromasters. Asako tries to escape but, thanks to Ruiko's assistance, she is quickly captured by Mikoto and the Anti-Skills. As Mikoto rewards her friends for their help, Kazari unintentionally reveals Kuroko was also legitimately stalking Mikoto at the same time, prompting a swift punishment.
2	"All the Important Things I Learned in a Bathhouse"; Transliteration: "Daiji na Koto wa Zenbu Sentō ni Osowatta" (Japanese: 大事なことはぜんぶ銭湯に教わった)	Yōhei Suzuki	N/A	Kiyoshi Komatsubara	March 27, 2014
As the local bathhouse comes under threat of being closed down, Mii enlists the help of Mikoto, Kuroko, Kazari, and Ruiko to help promote interest, coming up with a Mikoto-powered "electric bath" to bring in more customers. At first, the baths become a success which attracts the attention of Erii, Mitsuko, Wannai, Atsuki, Yomikawa, Tsuzuri, Komoe, Shizuri, Frenda, Saiai, Rikō, and the Dorm Supervisor. However, the baths are almost ruined after Kuroko adds too much bubble bath soap in one of her schemes to seduce Mikoto. After the customers go home, the girls celebrate by having a bath and drinking milk.

== Shorts ==
These shorts are released as bonus animation features on Japanese home media volumes for each season.

No.	Title	Directed by	Animation directed by	Original release date
1	"Much More Railgun"; Transliteration: "Motto Marutto Rērugan" (Japanese: もっとまるっと超電磁砲(レールガン))	Shingo Fukuyo	Shigeki Kimoto & Shinsuke Yanagi	February 7, 2010
A series of outtakes and bizarre sketches as experienced by the characters of the anime. Mikoto and her friends discuss internet rumors that the Dorm Supervisor was once a commando. Ruiko's class discuss Schrödinger's cat where the cat in question becomes a Palmtop Tiger. Yomikawa, Komoe and Tsuzuri have Nabe while Yomikawa talks about people and things which start with "Jan" like Jean-Claude Van Damme. Meanwhile, the gang wonders about Academy City's wind turbines and Mikoto makes a PSA about conserving electricity.
2	"Much More Railgun II"; Transliteration: "Motto Marutto Rērugan Ni" (Japanese: もっとまるっと超電磁砲(レールガン) II)	Shingo Fukuyo	Tomohiro Kamitani	May 28, 2010
More outtakes and bizarre sketches as experienced by the characters. Kuroko gives some peculiar lessons to her class. Ruiko and Kuroko get brainfreeze from eating their frozen treats. Harumi tries to explain what AIM Burst is but is interrupted by Mikoto and Kazari. Mitsuko is fishing while Kazari narrates. The gang drinks milk while watching the sunset. Mikoto tells her friends their lives are being watched by an unknown audience.
3	"Much More Railgun III"; Transliteration: "Motto Marutto Rērugan San" (Japanese: もっとまるっと超電磁砲(レールガン) III)	Shingo Fukuyo	Yukie Hiyamizu	July 24, 2013
Ruiko uses her nose to smell if Mikoto's lunches have gone bad. Shinobu teaches Mikoto some English words and punishes her when she gets them wrong. Misaka 9982 jokingly plays a Kōan on Mikoto. Shinobu gives a Misaka clone expert gaming knowledge which ends up making her a hardcore gamer. Accelerator and Misaka 9982 discuss their voice acting careers since starting in 2006. Mikoto and the others failed to notice that Kazari is with them, due to the latter not wearing her flower headband.
4	"Much More Railgun IV"; Transliteration: "Motto Marutto Rērugan Yon" (Japanese: もっとまるっと超電磁砲(レールガン) IV)	Shingo Fukuyo	Kiyoshi Komatsubara	November 27, 2013
Mikoto suspects Academy City may come under attack by Kaijus from a certain movie and how they must prepare themselves. The girls wonder if Turtle blood really has aphrodisiac effects and Misaka 10032-tan replaces Index-tan's role on Toma's head.
5	"Much More Railgun V"; Transliteration: "Motto Marutto Rērugan Go" (Japanese: もっとまるっと超電磁砲(レールガン) V)	Kazuki Horiguchi	Mineko Ueda	April 30, 2020
6	"Much More Railgun VI"; Transliteration: "Motto Marutto Rērugan Roku" (Japanese: もっとまるっと超電磁砲(レールガン) VI)	Kazuki Horiguchi	N/A	October 9, 2020
