= Robin Anthony =

American chef and restaurateur

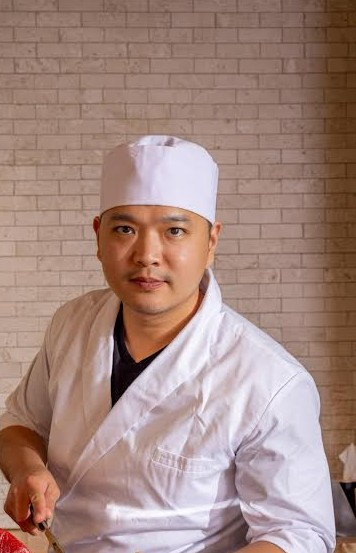
- Born: Indonesia
- Culinary career
- Current restaurants
- Prime Fish; Omakase Experience by Prime Fish; Prime Fish Cellar
- Awards
- James Beard Award Best Chef (Southeast) Semifinalist (2026)

Robin Anthony is an Indonesian-born chef, restaurateur, and sushi specialist based in Charlotte, North Carolina. He is the executive chef and owner of Prime Fish, Omakase Experience by Prime Fish, and Prime Fish Cellar.

He was named a semifinalist for the James Beard Foundation Award for Best Chef: Southeast in 2026. Restaurants associated with Anthony, including Omakase Experience by Prime Fish, have also been recognized by the Michelin Guide in its American South selections.

== Biography ==
Anthony was born in Indonesia and spent part of his childhood around Bali Island, where he was exposed to Indonesian seafood and regional culinary traditions from an early age. He later relocated to the United States, where he began pursuing a culinary career focused primarily on Japanese cuisine and sushi preparation.

Anthony later earned certification as a Certified Sake Adviser through the Sake School of America and completed sommelier training through the Court of Master Sommeliers Americas.

Anthony began his culinary career working in sushi restaurants in Raleigh, North Carolina, before relocating to Charlotte. He later worked as a sushi chef at Yama Waverly and participated in the development of Red Sake in Ballantyne.

In 2021, Anthony opened '''Prime Fish''' in Charlotte’s Ballantyne neighborhood. The restaurant specializes in sushi, seafood, and Japanese cuisine influenced by Edomae-style techniques and New York-style sushi service.

In 2022, Anthony opened '''Omakase Experience by Prime Fish''', a chef-curated omakase restaurant.

Anthony later expanded the Prime Fish brand with Prime Fish Cellar, a hybrid retail and dining concept focused on wine, sake, seafood, and speciality Japanese ingredients.

== Awards ==
Anthony was named a semifinalist for the James Beard Foundation Award for Best Chef: Southeast in 2026.

Restaurants associated with Anthony have received recognition from the Michelin Guide’s American South selections.
