= List of Otaku Elf chapters =

Otaku Elf is a Japanese manga series written and illustrated by Akihiko Higuchi. It began serialization in Kodansha's Shōnen Magazine Edge on June 17, 2019. After the magazine ended publication on October 18, 2023, the series was transferred to the Comic Days website starting on December 20. As of June 2026, 13 tankōbon volumes have been published. In North America, Seven Seas Entertainment has licensed the series in print and digital formats.

== Volumes ==
No.	Original release date	Original ISBN	English release date	English ISBN
1	November 15, 2019	978-4-06-517625-2	March 23, 2021	978-1-64-827078-9
1. "Story of the Otaku Elf" (東京のエルフのはなし, Tōkyō no Erufu no Hanashi); 2. "About the Parishioners" (氏子のみなさんのこと, Ujiko no Minasan no Koto); 3. "Tokyo and Our Past and Present" (東京と私達のいまむかし, Tōkyō to Watashitachi no Ima Mukashi); 4. "What the Otaku Elf Doesn't Know" (江戸前エルフと知らないこ, Edomae Erufu to Shiranai Ko); 5. "Our Comfort Food War" (ぼくらのソウルフード戦争, Bokura no Souru Fūdo Sensō); 6. "Let's Head Out to Monja Street" (いこうぜもんじゃストリート, Ikouze Monja Sutorīto); 7. "1/3 Innocent Desire" (1/3の純情な欲望, Sanbun no Ichi no Junjō na Yokubō); 8. "I'm Lovin' It" (Note: This chapter is stylized as "I'm lovin' it" in the Japanese version.); 9. "Otaku Elf and the Tokyoite Girls" (江戸前エルフと江戸っ子少女, Edomae Erufu to Edokko Shōjo); 10. "The School Girl and the Miko Succession Ceremony" (JK巫女と継承の儀, JK Miko to Keishō no Gi); 11. "The Otaku Elf and the School Girl" (江戸前エルフとJK巫女, Edomae Erufu to JK Miko); 12. "Go East!" (Note: This chapter is stylized in all caps in the Japanese version.)
2	April 16, 2020	978-4-06-519249-8	July 20, 2021	978-1-64-827247-9
13. "Friends from the Distant West" (朋有り西方より来る, Tomo Ari Seihō Yori Kitaru); 14. "The East-West Elf Battle" (古今東西エルフ合戦, Kokon Tōzai Erufu Kassen); 15. "The Reason for the Elf's Journey" (エルフが旅に出る理由, Erufu ga Tabi ni Deru Riyū); 16. "Season of Elfluenza" (物言えば唇寒しエルフ風邪, Mono Ieba Kuchibiru Samushi Erufu Kaze); 17. "Just Want Some Interaction" (かまってほしくて, Kamatte Hoshikute); 18. "Chef Koito's Impulsive Porridge" (小糸シェフのきまぐれおかゆ, Koito Shefu no Kimagure Okayu); 19. "Goddess's Dinner" (女神の晩餐, Megami no Bansan); 20. "Tsukishima Girl's Collection" (月島ガールズコレクション, Tsukishima Gāruzu Korekushon); 21. "The Collected Flower" (繋ぐ花, Tsunagu Hana); 22. "Reach Her Ears" (耳に届け, Mimi ni Todoke); 23. "The Otaku Elf's Cultural Enlightenment" (江戸前エルフの文明開化, Edomae Erufu no Bunmei Kaika); 24. "The Divine Troll of Tsukishima Shrine" (月島の女神はクソリプしか送ってこない, Tsukishima no Megami wa Kusoripu Shika Okutte Konai); 25. "Fly Me to the Tokyo Sky" (フライ・ミー・トゥー・ザ・トーキョー・スカイ, Furai Mi tu za Tōkyō Sukai); 26. "The Elf and Me and Old Mt. Fuji" (エルフと私と、時々、富士山, Erufu to Watashi to, Tokidoki, Fujisan); 27. "Stand By Me" (Note: This chapter is stylized as "Stand by Me" in the Japanese version.)
3	October 16, 2020	978-4-06-520771-0	December 28, 2021	978-1-64-827374-2
28. "Humble Long-Eared One" (卑しき耳のながいもの, Iyashiki Mimi no Nagai Mono); 29. "The Seasons Only Change You" (季節が君だけを変える, Kisetsu ga Kimi Dake wo Kaeru); 30. "Mail-Order Sugar High" (おとりよせシュガーハイ, Otoriyose Shugāhai); 31. "Master of Amusement" (あそびの達人, Asobi no Tatsujin); 32. "Enjoy! Edo Games!" (エンジョイ！ 江戸あそび！, Enjoi! Edo Asobi!); 33. "Bubbles of the Tamaya" (玉や、玉や, Tamaya, Tamaya); Extra: "An Elf's (Entirely Normal) Long Day" (エルフの（いつもどおりの）長い一日, Erufu no (Itsumo Dōri no) Nagai Ichinichi); 34. "The Longed-for Golden One" (憧れのゴールデン, Akogareno Gōruden); 35. "That Smell in the Streets" (街の匂いは, Machi no Nioi wa); 36. "You Are Rolling Thunder" (ゆーあーろーりんぐさんだー, Yū Ā Rōring Sandā); Extra: "Koito's (Entirely Normal) Short Day" (小糸の（いつもどおりの）短い一日, Koito no (Itsumo Dōri no) Mijikai Ichinichi); 37. "Elf-stagrammable" (エルフ映え, Erufu Bae); 38. "The Trick to Getting Along" (なかよしの秘訣, Nakayoshi no Hiketsu); 39. "Commotion..." (ざわ..., Zawa...)
4	May 17, 2021	978-4-06-523214-9	June 28, 2022	978-1-63-858322-6
40. "The Miko, Isuzu" (巫女いすゞ, Miko Isuzu); 41. "Didn't You Promise?" (約束したもんね？, Yakusoku shita mon ne?); 42. "A Girl and Her Elf's Circumstances" (彼女とエルフの事情, Kanojo to Erufu no jijō); 43. "The Cheater" (誤解です, Gokaidesu); 44. "Gotta Study" (勉強しなくちゃ, Benkyō shinakucha); 45. "You're an Elf, Teach Me!" (おしえてエルフ先生, Oshiete Erufu-sensei); 46. "Rainy Day Homebodies" (雨の日は家にいて, Ame no hi wa uchi ni ite); 47. "When I Get There, It's Always Drizzling" (たどり着いたらいつも雨降り, Tadoritsuitara itsumo amefuri); 48. "Raindrops Keep Fallin' on My Head" (雨にぬれても, Ame ni nurete mo); 49. "The Elf's Hidden Treasure" (エルフの秘宝, Erufu no hihō); 50. "Memory Set" (おもいでカセット, Omoide kasetto); 51. "Time After Time"; 52. "The Full Ceremony" (祭りだ祭りだ, Matsurida matsurida); 53. "The Legendary Elf Splash" (ムーンアイランド伝説, Mūn'airando densetsu); 54. "Sudden Headshot" (ヘッドショットは突然に, Heddo shotto wa totsuzen ni); Extra: "Story of Elves in Osaka" (大阪のエルフのはなし, Ōsaka no Erufu no hanashi)
5	November 17, 2021	978-4-06-526109-5	February 28, 2023	978-1-63-858898-6
55. "Srsly Yikes – One Week to Go" (MajiでHsする1週間前, Maji de Hs suru 1-shūkan mae); 56. "Let Fly the Arrows" (御弓を申す, Oyumi o mōsu); 57. "This Is My Deity" (これが私の御祭神, Kore ga watashi no gosaishin); 58. "(Don't) Believe in Yourself" (自分を信じるってステキな言葉だけどいちばん信じられないのって自分だよね, Jibun o shinjiru tte sutekina kotobadakedo ichiban shinjirarenai notte jibunda yo ne); 59. "Elves Loves Fizzies" (エルフはシュワシュワがお好き, Erufu wa shuwashuwa ga osuki); 60. "Now You've Got Me Wanting to Give It a Go" (やりたくなっちゃうんです, Yaritaku natchau desu); 61. "Just Plain Unlucky" (どうにもこうにもアンラッキー, Dōnimo kō ni mo anrakkī); 62. "Beckon, Lucky Cat" (招いてラッキーキャット, Maneite rakkīkyatto); 63. "The Elf Does Everything for Good Luck!" (開運！なんでもやるエルフ, Kaiun! Nan demo yaru Erufu); 64. "Detective Koma-chan" (名探偵コマちゃん, Meitantei Koma-chan); 65. "Brand-Name Box" (ブランドものの匣, Burando mono no hako); 66. "And Then There Were None to Profit" (そして誰も得しなかった, Soshite dare mo toku shinakatta); 67. "Lotsa Cookies" (クッキーがいっぱい, Kukkī ga ippai); 68. "Encircled Elf" (丸にエルフ, Maru ni Erufu); 69. "Hello, Pre-Grown-Up" (こんにちは赤さん, Kon'nichiwa Aka-san); Extra: "Tale of the Kaga Elf" (加賀のエルフのはなし, Kaga no Erufu no hanashi)
6	June 16, 2022	978-4-06-528054-6	September 5, 2023	979-8-88-843007-1
70. "Let's Play with the Baby!" (赤さんとあそぼう!, Aka-san to asobō!); 71. "Let's Go Out, Baby" (旅に出ようぜbaby, Tabi ni deyō ze baby); 72. "Ito, a Thread" (糸, Ito); 73. "We Have No Money!" (お金がない, Okane ga nai); 74. "Do You Have a Treasure?" (お宝あるかな, Otakara aru kana); 75. "The Million Yen of Our Dreams" (夢の100万円, Yume no 100 man-en); 76. "Gossip Spreads Like Wildfire" (ゴシップ千里を走る, Goshippu senri o hashiru); 77. "Takamimi Meme" (高耳ミーム, Takamimi mīmu); 78. "The Parishioners Cannot Be Silenced" (氏子の口に戸は立てられぬ, Ujiko no kuchi ni to wa tate rarenu); 79. "(After Waking Up in the Afternoon) She's Sure to Appear" ((昼過ぎにようやく起きて)きっと来る, (Hirusugi ni yōyaku okite) kittokuru); 80. "Kawaii!" (kawaii!); 81. "My Favorite Hairstyle" (わたしの好きな髪, Watashi no sukina kami); 82. "The Elf Takes a Jab Too" (寸鉄エルフも刺す, Suntetsu Erufu mo sasu); 83. "The Anatomy of Crass" (野暮の構造, Yabo no kōzō); 84. "The Story of the Girl She Doesn't Know" (彼女の知らない彼女のはなし, Kanojo no shiranai kanojo no hanashi); 85. "Make It Happen, Fairy!" (醸せ! 精霊ちゃん!, Kamose! Seirei-chan!); 86. "On the Defense and Offense When Protecting Feelings" (気遣いの攻防, Kidzukai no kōbō); 87. "What's in the Box?" (箱の中身はなんだろな, Hako no nakami wa nandaro na)
7	March 16, 2023	978-4-06-530958-2	May 28, 2024	979-8-88-843633-2
88. "What's in the Box? Part 2" (箱の中身はなんだろな II, Hako no nakami wa nandaro na II); 89. "Finally, the Unsealing Ceremony" (いざ開封の儀, Iza kaifū no gi); 90. "The Useless Pandora's Box" (ろくでもないパンドラの箱, Ro kude mo nai pandora no hako); 91. "If an Elf Buys a Tent" (エルフがテントを買ったなら, Erufu ga tento o kattanara); 92. "Awkward as the Countless Ocean Waves" (波の数だけ気まずくなって, Nami no kazu dake kimazuku natte); 93. "Take the Elf Camping" (エルフをキャンプに連れてって, Erufu o kyanpu ni tsuretette); 94. "The Amazing Vanishing Elf" (エルフの消失マジック, Erufu no shōshitsu majikku); 95. "There's Nothing Up My Sleeve" (タネも仕掛けもありますん, Tane mo shikake mo arimasun); 96. "Behold, a Perfectly Ordinary Miko" (ここに何の変哲もない巫女がいます, Koko ni nan'nohentetsumonai miko ga imasu); 97. "Something Koyuzu Can't Do" (小柚子の苦手なもの, Koyuzu no nigatena mono); 98. "Fun with Drawing" (お絵描きは楽しく, O ekaki wa tanoshiku); 99. "The World as I See It" (わたしから見える世界, Watashi kara mieru sekai); 100. "Gate to Elf" (エルフの岩戸, Erufu no Iwato); 101. "Open the Door" (扉をあけて, Tobira o akete); 102. "Where to Put Your Bias" (推しの置き場所, Oshi no oki basho); 103. "If Uramimi-sama Borrowed It" (麗耳様が借りたらば, Uramimi-sama ga karitaraba); 104. "Takamimi-sama's Lent and Borrowed Things" (高耳様の貸借事情, Takamimi-sama no taishaku jijō); 105. "Hiromimi-sama Loves a Whoop" (廣耳様はアゲアゲがお好き, Hiromimi-sama wa ageage ga o suki)
8	August 17, 2023	978-4-06-532718-0	January 28, 2025	979-8-89-160195-6
106. "Oh! Sushi!" (スシ食いねェ！, Sushi kuine!); 107. "What Can I Say...but Sushi" (何も言えなくて...寿司, Nani mo ienakute... sushi); 108. "Like This Evening's Sushi" (今宵の寿司のように, Koyoi no sushi no yō ni); 109. "Osaka Strut" (大阪ストラット, Ōsaka sutoratto); 110. "Can You Give Me a Discount?" (お値下げできます？, O nesage dekimasu?); 111. "Just a Small Token of Appreciation" (お気持ちていどで, O kimochite ido de); 112. "A Miko's Silly Riddles" (巫女の愚問, Miko no gumon); 113. "The Elf and the Riddle" (エルフのリドル, Erufu no ridoru); 114. "Puzzle It Out" (判じましょう, Hanjimashō); 115. "Elf Around and Find Out" (エルフも歩けば棒に当たる, Erufu mo arukeba bō ni ataru); 116. "Uramimi Can't Believe Her Ears" (麗耳へ水の果報, Uramimi e mizu no kahō); 117. "Better Luck Miko Time" (河豚にもあたれば巫女にもあたる, Fugu ni mo atareba miko ni mo ataru); 118. "Playback, Part Miko" (プレイバック part miko, Pureibakku part miko); 119. "Season of Bare Feet" (裸足の季節, Hadashi no kisetsu); 120. "Time Will Tell"; 121. "The Miko Who Will Be Cornered by a Delinquent in a Week" (1週間後にヤンキーに絡まれる巫女, 1-Shūkan-go ni yankī ni karama reru miko); 122. "The Neesan Incident" (姐さん、事件です, Nēsan, jiken desu); Extra: "Cat and the Elf" (ねことエルフ, Neko to Erufu)
9	February 16, 2024	978-4-06-534613-6	July 1, 2025	979-8-89373-008-1
123. "Secret Tsutome-chan" (秘密のつとめちゃん, Himitsu no Tsutome-chan); 124. "Panya-sama's Secret" (パンニャ様の秘密, Pan'nya-sama no himitsu); 125. "Let's Become Literary Novelists" (文筆家になろう, Bunpitsuka ni narō); 126. "Swingin' Sendai" (スウィンギン・センダイ, Sūingin Sendai); 127. "OH MY LITTLE GIRL"; 128. "Girls Bravo" (ガールズ・ブラボー！, Gāruzu burabō!); 129. "Legend of Elda: The Miko's Argument" (エルダの伝説 ～巫女の正論～, Eruda no densetsu ~ miko no seiron ~); 130. "First Harvest Capriccio" (初物カプリチオ, Hatsumono kapurichio); 131. "A Fun Paid Vacation" (楽しい有給休暇, Tanoshī yūkyū kyūka); 132. "Oh, the Unidentified" (ああ未確認, Ā mikakunin); 133. "A Shrine Deity YouTuber" (御祭神系ユーチューバー, Gosaishin-kei YūChūbā); 134. "E-san Born in Another World" (異世界生まれのEさん, Isekai umare no E-san); 135. "Elf vs. Mosquito" (エルフvs.蚊, Erufu vs. Ka); 136. "Sniping (the Elf)" (狙いうち(エルフを), Nerai uchi (Erufu o)); 137. "Fight Without Honor" (仁義なき たたかい, Jingi naki tatakai); 138. "Tsukishima Chainsaw" (ツキシマ・チェーンソー, Tsukishima chēnsō); 139. "Let's Go to the Culture Festival" (文化祭へ行こう, Bunka matsuri e ikou)
10	September 9, 2024	978-4-06-536784-1	December 9, 2025	979-8-89373-949-7
140. "Welcome to the Zombie Café" (ゾンビ喫茶にいらっしゃい, Zonbi kissa ni irasshai muryō); 141. "Whereabouts of the Deity" (御祭神のゆくえ, Gosaishin no yukue); 142. "For Whom the Bell Tolls" (誰がために鐘は鳴る, Daregatameni kane wa naru); 143. "Cruel Miko's Thesis" (残酷な巫女の提言, Zankokuna miko no teigen); 144. "So I Can't Escape..." (逃げちゃ駄目か～, Nigecha dame ka ~); 145. "The Miko Who Can Sleep in the Day" (眠れる昼の巫女, Nemureru hiru no miko); 146. "The Miko Who Can't Sleep at Night" (眠れぬ夜の巫女, Nemurenu yoru no miko); 147. "Night Stars" (夜の星, Yoru no hoshi); 148. "Let's Celebrate" (言祝ぎましょう, Kotohogai gima shou); 149. "Let's Be Positive" (ポジティブにいこう, Pojitibunīkō); 150. "Just Maybe..." (もしかしてだけど, Moshikashitedakedo); 151. "In Need of a Dentist" (歯医者さんを求めて, Haisha-san o motomete); Extra: "A Story About the Sendai Elf" (仙台のエルフのはなし, Sendai no Erufu no hanashi)
11	March 7, 2025	978-4-06-538734-4	May 12, 2026	979-8-89561-922-3
152. "The Deity's Depression" (御祭神の憂鬱, Gosaishin no yūutsu); 153. "Osaka Eats" (大阪うまいもん, Ōsaka umaimon); 154. "Party Night at Hiromimi-san's Place" (廣耳さんちはパーリナイ, Hiromimi-san chi wa pārinai); 155. "Shouting for the Businesses in the Middle of Osaka" (大阪の中心で商売繫盛を叫ぶ, Ōsaka no chūshin de shōbai kei sakari wo sakebu); 156. "The Rain's Sad, Huh?" (悲しい雨やね, Kanashī ameya ne); 157. "Elf, Wind & Fire"; 158. "Takamimi-sama's Osaka Souvenirs" (高耳様の下りもの, Takamimi-sama's no kudari mono); 159. "Memento Osaka" (メメント大阪, Memento Ōsaka); 160. "The Elf's Karma Farming" (エルフの積ん徳, Erufu no Tsun Toku); 161. "The Miko Has Ten Times Karma" (巫女に十の徳あり, Miko ni Jū no Toku Ari); 162. "Beyond Reach" (花は折りたし梢は高し, Hana wa Oritashi Kozue wa Takashi); 163. "When the Elf Sows the Seeds, the Miko Withers" (エルフが種蒔きゃ巫女が枯らす, Erufu ga Tanemaki Kya Miko ga Karasu); 164. "I'm Scared of Thieves" (どろぼうこわい, Doro bō Kowai); 165. "The Plan to Protect Takamimi Shrine" (高耳神社の防犯計画, Takamimi Jinja no Bōhan Keikaku); Extra: "Talking About Elf Flowers" (エルフの花のはなし, Erufu no Hana no Hanashi)
12	October 9, 2025	978-4-06-540631-1	November 10, 2026	979-8-89863-221-2
166. "Officer, That's the Elf" (お巡りさんこのエルフです, Omawarisan Kono Erufu Desu); 167. "The Self-Defense of Suspect Elf" (容疑者エルフの保身, Yōgi-sha Erufu no Hoshin); 168. "Absolutely Anonymous!" (Zettai！匿名！, Zettai! Tokumei!); 169. "Your Name (Anon)" (君の（匿）名は。, Kimi no (Toku) Na wa); 170. "How's Your Progress Going?" (進捗どうだが？, Shinchoku Dōdaga?); 171. "Y'Can Do It, Yahogu-sensei" (けっぱれ夜鳳宮先生, Keppare Yahogu-sensei); 172. "I Can Fix It" (お直しできます, Onaoshi Dekimasu); 173. "Do It Yourself?" (どぅーいっとゆあせるふ？, Do u Itto yu Aseru fu?); 174. "The Miko's Time Off" (巫女はお休み, Miko wa o Yasumi); 175. "Danny Boy"; 176. "Elda, Once Again" (エルダふたたび, Eruda Futatabi); 177. "Wi-Fi Lovers" (Wi-Fiの恋人, Waifai no Koibito); 178. "Run, Part-Timer" (走れアルバイター, Hashire Arubaitā); 179. "The Person in the Deity" (御祭神は中の人, Gosaishin wa Nakanojin)
13	June 9, 2026	978-4-06-543129-0	May 25, 2027	979-8-89863-999-0
180. Nakanojin wa Dare Deshou (中の人は誰でしょう); 181. Tobidase! Takamimi-chan (とびだせ! たかみみちゃん); 182. Yaritanai Miko (やりたない巫女); 183. Machi to Hito to Erufu to (街と人とエルフと); 184. Goshoubai Masumasu Hanjō (一斗二升五合(ごしょうばいますますはんじょう)); 185. Chotto Sorezore (一寸それぞれ); 186. Na wa Tai o Arawasun (名は体を表すん); 187. Kono ji nan no ji? (この字なんの字？); 188. Bihada no Hiketsu (びはだのひけつ); 189. O Hada ga Hyakusai Wakagaeru Sukinkea (お肌が100歳若返るスキンケア); 190. "Hello, World!"; 191. Inu wa OK? (犬はOK?); 192. Yappari Inu ga Kowai (やっぱり犬がこわい。)

=== Chapters not yet published in volume format ===
193. Inu no na wa (犬の名は)
194. Maigo Inu to Erufu no Bīto (や迷子犬とエルフのビート)
195. "Hello, World!"
196. ★ Ni Negai o (★に願いを)
197. Miagete Goran Rebyū no ★ o (見上げてごらんレビューの★を)
198. Kimi wa Tennen Shoku (君は天然色)
199. Puro to Shiteーーー (プロとしてーーー)
200. Megane ga ne (メガネがね)
201. "Black Tide"
202. Are mo Hoshii Kore mo Hoshii (あれも欲しいこれも欲しい)
203. Ryōte ja Kakae Kirenai (両手じゃ抱えきれない)
204. Tsuru wa Chitose Erufu wa Fukasetsufukasetsuten-toshi (鶴は千年 エルフは不可説不可説転年)
205. Imōto wa Hyakuyaku no Chō (妹は百薬の長)
206. Amai Seikatsu (甘い生活)
207. Futari de Dekiru Mon! (ふたりでできるもん!)
208. Niwakamen Butōkai (にわか面舞踏会)
209. Hiromimi-san Chi no Juyohin Jijō (廣耳さんちの授与品事情)
