= List of Hayate the Combat Butler albums =

This is a list of albums attributed to the anime adaptation of Hayate the Combat Butler.

== Opening and ending themes ==
=== Hayate no Gotoku! ===
Hayate no Gotoku! (ハヤテのごとく！) is a single by Kotoko released on May 23, 2007, in Japan by Geneon. The song "Hayate no Gotoku!" was the first opening theme to the anime Hayate the Combat Butler that aired with episodes one to twenty-six. The single peaked at 7th place on the Oricon singles charts.

No.	Title	Lyrics	Music	Length
1.	"Hayate no Gotoku! (ハヤテのごとく！)"	Kotoko	Kazuya Takase	4:26
2.	"Nakitakattanda (泣きたかったんだ)"	Kotoko	C.G Mix	6:50
3.	"Hayate no Gotoku! -instrumental- (ハヤテのごとく！ -instrumental-)"			4:26
4.	"Nakitakattanda -instrumental-(泣きたかったんだ -instrumental-)"			6:47
Total length:				22:29

=== Proof/no vain ===
Proof/no vain is a single by Mell released on May 30, 2007, in Japan by Geneon. The song "Proof" was the first ending theme to the anime Hayate the Combat Butler that aired with episodes one to thirteen.

No.	Title	Lyrics	Music	Length
1.	"Proof"	Mell	Kazuya Takase	5:33
2.	"no vain"	Mell	Kazuya Takase	6:00
3.	"Proof -Instrumental-"			5:33
4.	"no vain -Instrumental-"			5:58
Total length:				23:04

=== Get my way! ===
Get my way! is a single by Mami Kawada released on August 8, 2007, in Japan by Geneon. The song "Get my way" was the second ending theme to the anime Hayate the Combat Butler aired from episode fourteen to twenty-six.

No.	Title	Lyrics	Music	Length
1.	""Get my way!""	Mami Kawada	Kazuya Takase	2:56
2.	"Aozora to Taiyō (青空と太陽)"	Mami kawada	Tomoyuki Nakazawa	4:24
3.	""Get my way! -instrumental-""			2:56
4.	"Aozora to Taiyō -instrumental-" (青空と太陽 -instrumental-)"			4:18
Total length:				14:31

=== Shichiten Hakki Shijōshugi! ===
Shichiten Hakki Shijōshugi! (七転八起☆至上主義!) is a single by Kotoko released on October 17, 2007, in Japan by Geneon. The song "Shichiten Hakki ☆ Shijōshugi!" is the second opening theme to the anime Hayate the Combat Butler which began airing at episode twenty-seven.

No.	Title	Lyrics	Music	Length
1.	"Shichiten Hakki Shijōshugi!(七転八起☆至上主義!)"	Kotoko	C.G Mix	4:38
2.	"scene"	Kotoko	Kazuya Takase	4:47
3.	"Shichiten Hakki Shijōshugi! -instrumental-(七転八起☆至上主義! -instrumental-)"			4:38
4.	"scene -instrumental-"			4:44
Total length:				18:47

=== Chasse ===
Chasse is a single by Kaori Utatsuki that was released on November 21, 2007, in Japan by Geneon. The song "Chasse" is the third ending theme to the anime Hayate the Combat Butler which began airing at episode twenty-seven.

No.	Title	Lyrics	Music	Length
1.	"Chasse"	Kotoko	Kazuya Takase	3:45
2.	"Change of heart"	Kaori Utatsuki	Maiko Iuchi	5:12
3.	"Chasse -instrumental-"			3:45
4.	"Change of heart -instrumental-"			5:11
Total length:				17:23

=== Oto no nai Yozora ni/Ko no me kaze ===
Oto no nai Yozora ni/Ko no me kaze (音のない夜空に/木の芽風) is IKU's debut single released on March 19, 2008, in Japan by Geneon. The song "Ko no me kaze" is the fourth ending theme to the anime Hayate the Combat Butler which began airing at episode forty.

No.	Title	Lyrics	Music	Length
1.	""Oto no nai Yozora ni""
2.	""Ko no me kaze""	Iku	Kazuya Takase
3.	""Oto no nai Yozora ni" -instrumental-"
4.	""Ko no me kaze" -instrumental-"

== Soundtracks ==
=== Original Soundtrack 1 ===
Hayate the Combat Butler Original Soundtrack 1

Soundtrack album by Kōtarō Nakagawa
- Released: June 22, 2007
- Recorded: 2007
- Genre: Anime soundtrack
- Length: 36:56
- Label: Geneon

The Hayate the Combat Butler Original Soundtrack 1 is the first soundtrack to the anime version of Hayate the Combat Butler released by Geneon on June 22, 2007. The soundtrack is composed and arranged by Kōtarō Nakagawa.

No.	Title	Length
1.	"Sassō(颯爽)"	1:12
2.	"Kimama(気儘)"	1:23
3.	"Subtitle(サブタイトル)"	0:10
4.	"Sōrei(壮麗)"	1:08
5.	"Katsugeki(活劇)"	1:30
6.	"Hanmon(煩悶)"	1:12
7.	"Fungeki"(奮激)"	1:42
8.	"Soso(楚々)"	1:23
9.	"Yūyū(悠々)"	1:09
10.	"Heion(平穏)"	1:05
11.	"Kyasha(華奢)"	1:30
12.	"Eyecatch I(アイキャッチ い)"	0:09
13.	"Koga(古雅)"	1:29
14.	"Naniwa(浪花)"	1:26
15.	"Eyecatch Ro(アイキャッチ ろ)"	0:09
16.	"Kesshi(決死)"	1:21
17.	"Nonki(暢気)"	1:33
18.	"Jiai(慈愛)"	1:26
19.	"Onjū(温柔)"	1:27
20.	"Hippaku(逼迫)"	1:34
21.	"Kiki(嬉々)"	1:30
22.	"Shōchin(消沈)"	1:16
23.	"Chame(茶目)"	1:27
24.	"Akkei(悪計)"	1:07
25.	"Ihyō(意表)"	0:38
26.	"Kikyoku(危局)"	1:16
27.	"Tōjō(登場)"	1:13
28.	"Ketsui(決意)"	1:28
29.	"Seishuku(静淑)"	1:33
30.	"Nodaka(長閑)"	1:16
31.	"Teikyō Back (提供バック)"	0:14
Total length:		36:56

=== Original Soundtrack 2 ===
Hayate the Combat Butler Original Soundtrack 2

Soundtrack album by Kōtarō Nakagawa
- Released: February 22, 2008
- Recorded: 2007
- Genre: Anime soundtrack
- Label: Geneon

The Hayate the Combat Butler Original Soundtrack 2 is the second soundtrack to the anime version of Hayate the Combat Butler that was released by Geneon on February 22, 2008. The soundtrack is composed and arranged by Kōtarō Nakagawa.

== Audio dramas ==
=== Drama CDs ===
==== Hermione Ayasaki and the Private Lessons ====
Hayate the Combat Butler Drama CD 1: Hermione Ayasaki and the Private Lessons

Studio album by 10 voice actors
- Released: August 24, 2007
- Recorded: 2007
- Genre: Drama
- Length: 37:54
- Label: Geneon

Hayate the Combat Butler Drama CD 1: Hermione Ayasaki and the Private Lessons is the first drama CD based on the anime version of the series Hayate the Combat Butler. It was first released on August 24, 2007, by Geneon.

Track listing

1. "Hayate no Yume"
2. "Title Call"
3. "Sore, Donna Josō Gaku"
4. "Character Song no Zensetsu no Yōna"
5. "Motto Sugao de Hermione"
  - Vocals: Hitomi Nabatame featuring Ryōko Shiraishi
  - Lyrics: Mike Sugiyama
  - Music: Kōhei Tanaka
  - Arrangement: Minoru Maruo
6. "Character Song no Nochi Setsu no Yōna"
7. "Munasawagi no Hōkago"
8. "Arigachi na Gokai"
9. "Gofukuya Pierre to Mayutsuba na Shinjitsu"
10. "Mahō Shōjo Tanjō!"
11. "Fushigi O Jikū ni Hikizuri Kome!"
12. "Ai to Jounetsu no Carnaval"
  - Vocals: Shizuka Itō
  - Lyrics: Mike Sugiyama
  - Music: Kōhei Tanaka
  - Arrangement: Takayuki Negishi
13. "Kettō! BGM wa Kenka wo Yamete"
14. "Daidanen"
15. "Hayate no Gotoku! Owari Shō Shutsuensha go Aisatsu"

Cast listing

- Ryōko Shiraishi as Hayate/Hermione
- Rie Kugimiya as Nagi Sanzenin
- Rie Tanaka as Maria
- Shizuka Itō as Hinagiku Katsura
- Hitomi Nabatame as Yukiji Katsura
- Miyu Matsuki as Isumi/Isumiso
- Sayuri Yahagi as Izumi Segawa
- Eri Nakao as Miki Hanabishi
- Masumi Asano as Risa Asakaze
- Norio Wakamoto as the Narrator

==== Hakuo Gakuin Bus Tour and Maria Talking to Herself ====
Hayate the Combat Butler Drama CD 2: Hakuo Gakuin Bus Tour and Maria Talking to Herself

Studio album by 10 voice actors
- Released: March 7, 2008
- Genre: Drama
- Label: Geneon

Hayate the Combat Butler Drama CD 2: Hakuo Gakuin Bus Tour and Maria Talking to Herself is the second drama CD based on the anime version of the series Hayate the Combat Butler. It was scheduled for release on February 22, 2008, but it was later changed to March 7, 2008, by Geneon.

Track listing

TBA

Cast listing

- Ryōko Shiraishi as Hayate/Hermione
- Rie Kugimiya as Nagi Sanzenin
- Rie Tanaka as Maria
- Shizuka Itō as Hinagiku Katsura
- Marina Inoue as Wataru Tachibana
- Mikako Takahashi as Ayumu Nishizawa
- Hitomi Nabatame as Yukiji Katsura
- Sayuri Yahagi as Izumi Segawa
- Eri Nakao as Miki Hanabishi
- Masumi Asano as Risa Asakaze

==== First Love ====
Hayate the Combat Butler Drama CD 3: First Love

Studio album by 10 voice actors
- Released: March 21, 2008
- Genre: Drama
- Label: Geneon

Hayate the Combat Butler Drama CD 3: First Love is the third drama CD based on the anime version of the series Hayate the Combat Butler. It was released on March 21, 2008, by Geneon.

Track listing

TBA

Cast listing

- Ryōko Shiraishi as Hayate/Hermione
- Rie Kugimiya as Nagi Sanzenin
- Rie Tanaka as Maria
- Shizuka Itō as Hinagiku Katsura
- Marina Inoue as Wataru Tachibana
- Mikako Takahashi as Ayumu Nishizawa
- Hitomi Nabatame as Yukiji Katsura
- Sayuri Yahagi as Izumi Segawa
- Eri Nakao as Miki Hanabishi
- Masumi Asano as Risa Asakaze

==== Gōgō Seitokai Tenkenjā VS Kyōfu no Donperi Kaijin Yukijin ====
Hayate the Combat Butler Nekketsu Drama CD Gōgō Seitokai Tenkenjā VS Kyōfu no Donperi Kaijin Yukijin

Studio album by 8 voice actors
- Released: August 2007
- Recorded: 2007
- Genre: Drama
- Length: 20:15

Hayate the Combat Butler Nekketsu Drama CD Gōgō Seitokai Tenkenjā VS Kyōfu no Donperi Kaijin Yukijin (Hayate the combat butler 熱血ドラマCD 轟轟生徒会タンケンジャー VS 恐怖のドンペリ怪人ユキジン) is a promotional released drama CD released through the magazine Shōnen Sunday based on the anime version of the series Hayate the Combat Butler!.

Track listing

1. "Prologue"
2. "Aku no Himitsu Kichinite"
3. "Hiruyasumi no Seitokai Shitsu"
4. "Kasettotēpu no Aru Heya"
5. "Zawameku Kyōshitsu"
6. "Shukkin"
7. "CM"
8. "Surechigau Hitobito"
9. "Tankenjaa Idō Chū"
10. "Kessen"
11. "Epilogue"
12. "[Gōgō Seitokai Tankenjā] Shudaika"
  - Vocals: Masaaki Endoh
  - Lyrics: Mike Sugiyama
  - Music: Kōhei Tanaka
  - Arrangement: PE
13. "Jikai Yokoku"

Cast listing

- Ryōko Shiraishi as Hayate Ayasaki
- Rie Kugimiya as Nagi Sanzenin
- Shizuka Itō as Hinagiku Katsura
- Hitomi Nabatame as Yukiji Katsura
- Sayuri Yahagi as Izumi Segawa
- Eri Nakao as Miki Hanabishi
- Masumi Asano as Risa Asakaze
- Norio Wakamoto as the Narrator

=== Radio CDs ===
==== Radio the Combat Butler Volume 1 ====
Radio the Combat Butler Vol. 1

Studio album
- Released: September 21, 2007
- Recorded: 2007
- Genre: Radio drama
- Label: Geneon

Radio the Combat Butler Volume 1 is the first compilation of the web radio show Radio the Combat Butler, featuring Rie Kugimiya, the voice actor for Nagi Sanzenin, Ryōko Shiraishi, the voice actor for Hayate Ayasaki, and occasionally replacing Ryoko Shiraishi, Rie Tanaka, the voice actor for Maria. It was released by Geneon on September 21, 2007, on two CDs. The first CD contains new recordings that never aired and the second CD contains thirteen episodes of the web radio show that aired between April 6, 2007, and June 29, 2007.

Track Listing

Disk One

1. Opening
2. Challenge 1! Yuumei Retro Game ni Challenge
3. Challenge 2! Messe
4. Challenge 3! Kuzusu na!
5. Challenge 4! Kuroge Kiki Hatsu
6. Challenge 5! Star
7. Challenge 6! Noban
8. Challenge 7! Un mo Jitsuryouku no Uchi!
9. Ending

Disk Two

1. April 6, 2007
2. April 12, 2007
3. April 20, 2007
4. April 27, 2007
5. May 4, 2007
6. May 11, 2007
7. May 18, 2007
8. May 25, 2007
9. June 1, 2007
10. June 8, 2007
11. June 15, 2007
12. June 22, 2007
13. June 29, 2007

==== Radio the Combat Butler Volume 2 ====
Radio the Combat Butler Vol. 2

Studio album
- Released: December 21, 2007
- Recorded: 2007
- Genre: Radio drama
- Length: 54:18 and 6:22:16
- Label: Geneon

Radio the Combat Butler Volume 2 is the second compilation of the web radio show Radio the Combat Butler, featuring Rie Kugimiya and Ryōko Shiraishi, the voice actor for Nagi Sanzenin and Hayate Ayasaki respectively. It was released by Geneon on December 21, 2007. Like the first volume, volume two is two disks. The first CD contains new recordings and the second CD contains thirteen web radio episodes that aired between July 6, 2007, and September 28, 2007, in mp3 format.

Track Listing

Disk One

1. Tokubetsu Hen

Disk Two

1. July 6, 2007
2. July 13, 2007
3. July 20, 2007
4. July 27, 2007
5. August 3, 2007
6. August 10, 2007
7. August 17, 2007
8. August 24, 2007
9. August 31, 2007
10. September 7, 2007
11. September 14, 2007
12. September 21, 2007
13. September 28, 2007

== Character song albums ==
Twelve music albums for Hayate the Combat Butler have been released featuring songs sung by the voice actors for not only the main cast, but also from the supporting cast of characters. The first two albums, released on May 25, 2007, include songs by Ryōko Shiraishi as Hayate Ayasaki and Rie Tanaka as Maria. The next two, released on July 25, 2007, include songs by Rie Kugimiya as Nagi Sanzenin and Shizuka Itō as Hinagiku Katsura. Volumes five and six, released on September 21, 2007, contained songs by Miyu Matsuki as Isumi Saginomiya and Kana Ueda as Sakuya Aizawa. Volume seven, released on November 21, 2007, contained songs by Marina Inoue as Wataru Tachibana and Saki Nakajima as Saki Kijima, while volume eight released on the same day contained songs by Mikako Takahashi as Ayumu Nishizawa. Album number nine, released on January 25, 2008, includes songs by Hitomi Nabatame as Yukiji Katsura, and volume ten released on the same day is a trio between Eri Nakao, Sayuri Yahagi, and Masumi Asano as Miki Hanabishi, Izumi Segawa, and Risa Asakaze respectively. The eleventh release, on March 21, 2008, is another album by Rie Kugimiya, and the twelfth album, released on the same day, is a duet with Rie Tanaka and Shizuka Itō.
