= Your Wear =

Studio album by Iku
- Released: March 25, 2009
- Genre: J-Pop
- Length: 62 minutes
- Label: Geneon-Universal Entertainment Japan

Your Wear (ユアウエア) is the debut album by Japanese pop singer Iku. It was released on March 25, 2009 under the Geneon and Universal labels. The album contains tracks from all three of her previously released singles.

The album was released in a regular CD-only edition (GNCL-1199) as well as a CD+DVD (GNCL-1198) limited edition. The limited edition contains the promotional videos for "Oto no nai Yozora ni" (音のない夜空に), "Rimless: Fuchinashi no Sekai" (Rimless 〜フチナシノセカイ〜) and "Chikaigoto: Sukoshi Dake Mou Ichido" (誓い言 ～スコシだけもう一度～).

== Track listing ==
1. Spring up – 1:22
  Composer/arrangement： Maiko Iuchi
2. Ko no me Kaze (木の芽風) – 4:44
  Lyrics/composer： Iku, Arrangement： Kazuya Takase
  (Ending theme from TV Tokyo anime series Hayate no Gotoku!)
3. Sasayaka na Koto (ささやかなこと) – 4:54
  Lyrics: Iku, Composer/arrangement： Bassy
4. Kanashii Seiza (悲しい星座) – 6:14
  Lyrics: Iku, Composer/arrangement： Satoshi Yaginuma
5. Oto no nai Yozora ni (音のない夜空に) – 5:29
  Lyrics： Iku, Composer/arrangement：Kazuya Takase
  (Nippon Television Series Purin Su theme song)
6. Under the Bed – 4:27
  Lyrics/composer： Rubina, Arrangement： Zentaro Watanabe
7. The Winds of Change – 5:48
  Lyrics: Iku, Composer/arrangement： Hiroyuki Oshima
8. Rimless： Fuchinashi no Sekai (Rimless 〜フチナシノセカイ〜) – 3:59
  Lyrics： Iku, Composer： Iku, Kazuya Takase/Arrangement： Kazuya Takase
  (Ending theme from TV Kanagawa anime series Toaru Majutsu no Index)
9. Harukana Sekai (ハルカナセカイ) – 5:35
  Lyrics: Hiiro Misaki, Composer： Nao, Arrangement： Zentaro Watanabe
10. Oshimai no Uso (おしまいの嘘) – 4:57
  Lyrics/composer： Iku, Arrangement： Kazuya Takase
11. Fine – 5:09
  Lyrics: Iku, Composer/Arrangement： Shigetoshi Yamada
12. Chikaigoto: Sukoshi Dake Mou Ichido (誓い言 〜スコシだけもう一度〜) – 4:23
  Lyrics/composer： Iku, Arrangement： Kazuya Takase
  (Ending theme from TV Kanagawa anime series Toaru Majutsu no Index)
13. Kingyo to Awatsubu (金魚と泡粒) – 4:47
  Lyrics: Hiiro Misaki, Composer： Yoshiaki Dewa, Arrangement： Ryuuji Yamamoto
