= A Certain Dark Item =

Japanese light novel series

- First light novel volume cover, featuring Frenda Seivelun and Shizuri Mugino

とある暗部の少女共棲(アイテム) (Toaru Anbu no Aitemu)
- Genre: Action; Science fiction
- Light novel
- Written by: Kazuma Kamachi
- Illustrated by: Nilitsu
- Published by: ASCII Media Works
- Imprint: Dengeki Bunko
- Original run: March 10, 2023 – present
- Volumes: 7
- Manga
- Written by: Kazuma Kamachi
- Illustrated by: strelka
- Published by: ASCII Media Works
- Imprint: Dengeki Comics NEXT
- Magazine: Dengeki Daioh
- Original run: October 27, 2023 – present
- Volumes: 2
- Anime television series
- Directed by: Tatsuyuki Nagai
- Written by: Shōgo Yasukawa
- Music by: Maiko Iuchi
- Studio: J.C.Staff
- Licensed by: Crunchyroll: SEA: Muse Communication
- Original network: AT-X, Tokyo MX, BS11
- Original run: October 9, 2026 – present
- Episodes: 6
- icon

A Certain Dark Item (Japanese: とある暗部の少女共棲(アイテム), Hepburn: Toaru Anbu no Aitemu) (Note: The kanji 少女共棲 in the Japanese title is read as Shōjo Kyōsei.) is a Japanese light novel series written by Kazuma Kamachi and illustrated by Nilitsu, which is a spin-off of Kamachi's A Certain Magical Index series, focusing on the women belonging to Academy City's dark side. ASCII Media Works have published seven volumes since March 2023 under their Dengeki Bunko imprint. A manga adaptation with art by strelka has been serialized in ASCII Media Works' shōnen manga magazine Dengeki Daioh since October 2023 and has been collected in two tankōbon volumes. An anime television series adaptation produced by J.C.Staff premiered in October 2026.

== Plot ==
Inside Academy City exists ITEM, an elite group of four girls: Rikou Takitsubo, who can track the powers emitted by espers; Frenda Seivelun, who excels in combat; Saiai Kinuhata, who can control nitrogen; and Shizuri Mugino, who is one of Academy City's seven Level 5s. They live in the underworld of Academy City and are devoted to carrying out their mission.

== Characters ==
Shizuri Mugino (麦野沈利, Mugino Shizuri)
Voiced by: Ami Koshimizu
Rikou Takitsubo (滝壺理后, Takitsubo Rikō)
Voiced by: Aya Suzaki
Frenda Seivelun (フレンダ セイヴェルン, Furenda Seivuerun)
Voiced by: Maaya Uchida
Saiai Kinuhata (絹旗最愛, Kinuhata Saiai)
Voiced by: Chinatsu Akasaki
Chōbi Hanano (華野超美, Hanano Chōbi)
Voiced by: Hana Hishikawa

== Media ==
=== Light novels ===
Written by Kazuma Kamachi and illustrated by Nilitsu, A Certain Dark Item began publication under ASCII Media Works' Dengeki Bunko light novel imprint on March 10, 2023. Seven volumes have been released as of October 9, 2026.

No.	Release date	ISBN
1	March 10, 2023	978-4-04-914939-5
Prologue: Feminine, Dangerous, Bright (序章 フェミニンデンジャラスブライト); Chapter 1: The Fifth Girl (第一章『五』人目の少女); Chapter 2: >>Colosseum. (第二章 >>Colosseum.); Chapter 3: A Certain Courage, A Secret Reward (第三章 とある勇気、秘密の報酬); Chapter 4: Level 5 Roars (第四章 超能力者は咆哮する); Epilogue: A Road That Leads to Somewhere Someday (終章 いつかどこかに繋がる道)
2	August 10, 2023	978-4-04-915081-0
3	June 7, 2024	978-4-04-915699-7
4	March 7, 2025	978-4-04-916233-2
5	September 10, 2025	978-4-04-916593-7
6	February 10, 2026	978-4-04-916884-6
7	October 9, 2026	978-4-04-952405-5

=== Manga ===
A manga adaptation illustrated by strelka began serialization in ASCII Media Works' shōnen manga magazine Dengeki Daioh on October 27, 2023. The manga's chapters have been compiled into two tankōbon volumes as of April 2025.

No.	Release date	ISBN
1	June 26, 2024	978-4-04-915751-2
2	April 24, 2025	978-4-04-916381-0

=== Anime ===
An anime television series adaptation was announced during the "Dengeki Bunko Winter Festival 2025" livestream event on February 16, 2025. The series is produced by J.C.Staff and directed by Tatsuyuki Nagai, with Shōgo Yasukawa handling series composition, Shigeki Kimoto designing the characters and Maiko Iuchi composing the music. It premiered in October 9, 2026, on AT-X and other networks. The opening theme song is "Ghost Sequence", performed by East of Eden, and the ending theme song is "Genshi Kuzushi (Meltdowner)" (原子崩し（メルトダウナー）), performed by Kisida Kyodan & The Akebosi Rockets. Crunchyroll will stream the series. Muse Communication licensed the series in Southeast Asia.
