= Teru Ikuta =

Japanese actress

- 生田 輝
- Born: 30 April 1991 (age 35)
- Education: Toho Gakuen College of Drama and Music
- Occupations: Actress; singer
- Years active: 2015–present
- Employer: Queens Avenue
- Notable work: Revue Starlight as Futaba Isurugi; The Idolmaster Cinderella Girls as Natalia; Otaku Elf as Himawari Kohinata

Teru Ikuta (Japanese: 生田 輝, Hepburn: Ikuta Teru; born 30 April 1991) is a Japanese actress and singer from Osaka Prefecture, affiliated with Queens Avenue. She is known for playing Futaba Isurugi in Revue Starlight, Natalia in The Idolmaster Cinderella Girls, Himawari Kohinata in Otaku Elf. She has also appeared in several stage productions, including adaptations of Basara and Cutie Honey.

== Biography ==
Teru Ikuta, a native of Osaka Prefecture, was born on 30 April 1991 and educated at the Toho Gakuen College of Drama and Music. Her first film role was as Satsuki in the 2015 film Akagire.

In April 2017, it was announced that she would portray Futaba Isurugi in Bushiroad's Revue Starlight franchise. In addition to the franchise's 2018 anime adaptation., she also reprised the role in the video game Revue Starlight: Re LIVE and the franchise's stage plays, concert performances, and music releases.

In September 2019, she was cast as Natalia in The Idolmaster Cinderella Girls. Since then, she has performed as a singer on several Idolmaster music releases, including the April 2022 single The Idolmaster Cinderella Master 061-063: Akari Tsujino, Hayate Hisakawa, Natalia (which charted at #9 in the Oricon Singles Chart) and the June 2022 single The Idolmaster Cinderella Girls Starlight Master R/Lock On! 17: Demolish (which charted at #17 in the Oricon Singles Chart).

In November 2018, she was cast in Basara Gaiden: Katana Niji no Hanashi: Ginnan, the January 2019 stage adaptation of Basara at Kinokuniya Hall in Tokyo. In December 2019, she was cast as Aoi Hayami in Cutie Honey Emotional, the February 2020 stage adaptation of Cutie Honey at the Ikebukuro Sunshine Gekijō. In April 2023, she was cast as Himawari Kohinata in Otaku Elf.

== Filmography ==
=== Live-action television ===
2015

- Dr. Storks

2016

- 99.9 Criminal Lawyer
- Knight Hero Naoto

2017

- Mahiru no Akuma

2022

- Kojinsa Arimasu, Aoi

=== Animated television ===
2018

- Revue Starlight, Futaba Isurugi

2022

- Crayon Shin-chan, Yoshimi Yagio

2023

- Doraemon, Ashita no Shinbun
- Otaku Elf, Himawari Kohinata

=== Web Animation ===
- The Idolmaster Cinderella Girls Theater Extra Stage, Natalia

=== Video games ===
2018

- Revue Starlight: Re LIVE, Futaba Isurugi

2019

- The Idolmaster Cinderella Girls: Starlight Stage, Natalia

2023

- Reverse: 1999, Centurion

2024

- Touhou LostWord, Sakuya Izayoi

=== Stage performances ===
2019

- Basara Gaiden: Katana Niji no Hanashi: Ginnan

2020

- Cutie Honey Emotional, Aoi Hayami

2021

- Joō Rinbu

2023

- Joō Gensō Kageki
- Neo Doll
