= Kien Romance =

Single by Nanawo Akari
- Language: Japanese
- Released: April 8, 2023
- Genre: Rock
- Length: 3:41
- Label: Sony Music Entertainment Japan
- Songwriter: Wanuka
- Producer: 100kaiouto

Music video
- "Kien Romance" on YouTube

"Kien Romance" (奇縁ロマンス) is a song by Japanese singer Nanawo Akari. The song serves as the theme song for the anime Otaku Elf.

== Personnel ==
Credits adapted from Apple Music.

Musicians

- Nanawo Akari – Vocals

Technical

- Wanuka – Songwriter
- 100kaiouto – Arranger
- Akihiro Shib – Mastering Engineer
- Hiroto Aoki – Mixing Engineer

== Charts ==
Chart performance for "Kien Romance"
Chart (2023)	Peak position
Japan Combined Singles (Oricon)	32
