= Otaku Elf =

Japanese manga series by Akihiko Higuchi

- First tankōbon volume cover, featuring Koito Koganei (left) and Elda (right)

江戸前エルフ (Edomae Erufu)
- Genre: Fantasy comedy
- Manga
- Written by: Akihiko Higuchi
- Published by: Kodansha
- English publisher: NA: Seven Seas Entertainment
- Imprint: Magazine Edge KC
- Magazine: Shōnen Magazine Edge (2019–2023); Comic Days (2023–present)
- Original run: June 17, 2019 – present
- Volumes: 13
- Anime television series
- Directed by: Takebumi Anzai
- Written by: Shōgo Yasukawa
- Music by: Akito Matsuda
- Studio: C2C
- Licensed by: Sentai Filmworks: SA/SEA: Medialink
- Original network: MBS, TBS, BS-TBS, AT-X
- Original run: April 8, 2023 – June 24, 2023
- Episodes: 12
- icon

Otaku Elf (Japanese: 江戸前エルフ, Hepburn: Edomae Erufu) is a Japanese manga series written and illustrated by Akihiko Higuchi. It began serialization in Kodansha's Shōnen Magazine Edge in June 2019. After the magazine ended publication, the series was moved to the Comic Days website in December 2023. Its chapters have been collected in 13 tankōbon volumes as of June 2026. An anime television series adaptation produced by C2C aired from April to June 2023.

== Plot ==
Sixteen-year-old Koito Koganei has recently become a miko at the Takamimi Shrine, and thus the caretaker of the shrine's living "deity", a beautiful ageless elf by the name of Elda. However, Elda is a shut-in who greatly fears going beyond the boundaries of the shrine ever since a boy accidentally taunted her about her ears 60 years ago. As a result, Koito tries to get Elda out of her self-made shell and enjoy life in the larger world, with somewhat mixed success.

== Characters ==
Koito Koganei (小金井 小糸, Koganei Koito)
Voiced by: Yuka Ozaki
Koito inherited her miko position in the 15th generation of her family after her mother died, along with a lot of frustration since her shrine's "goddess" - an elf summoned hundreds of years ago - is not the kind of awe-inspiring being outlined in fantasy fiction. Despite this, she cares for Elda after the elf had comforted her over her mother's death when she was six years old.
Elda (エルダ, Eruda) / Eldarie Irma Fanomene (エルダリエ・イルマ・ファノメネル, Erudarie Iruma Fanomeneru)
Voiced by: Ami Koshimizu
A beautiful female elf, age 621, who was summoned from another world to Earth over 400 years ago by Tokugawa Ieyasu. She became the local "deity" of the Takamimi Shrine under the title Takamimi Hime no Mikoto (高耳毘売命), but instead of attending to her "divine" duties, she has become a hardline otaku who prefers to lounge in the house and pass her time with watching anime, playing video games, eating food and drinking energy drinks. Her only magical talent is making telepathic contact with other persons. Despite her faults and her extreme shyness, she is immensely popular in the local neighborhood, mostly because of her unaging nature.
Koma Sakuraba (桜庭 高麗, Sakuraba Koma)
Voiced by: Haruka Aikawa
Koito's schoolmate and best friend.
Koyuzu Koganei (小金井 小柚子, Koganei Koyuzu)
Voiced by: Hitomi Sekine
Koito's younger sister. Despite her tender age, she is a well-rounded and talented cook whose dishes are greatly favored by Elda. She is also a famous person at the local wholesale seafood market, and is admired by everyone there.
Yord (ヨルデ, Yorude) / Yordeilla Lila Fenomenea (ヨルデリラ・リラ・フェノメネア, Yoruderira Rira Fenomenea)
Voiced by: Rie Kugimiya
A 622-year-old female dark elf and the "deity" of the Hiromimi Shrine bearing the honorary name Hiromimi Hime no Mikoto (廣耳比売命). She was summoned to Earth at the same time as Elda, except by Toyotomi Hideyoshi. She is extremely energetic and, unlike Elda, has traveled far and wide across Japan, but has in turn a bad sense of orientation. And despite being Elda's elder by one year, she looks and behaves much like a child.
Himawari Kohinata (小日向 向日葵, Kohinata Himawari)
Voiced by: Teru Ikuta
A blonde girl who, like Koito, is sixteen years old, fifteenth miko in her family line, and Yord's caretaker.
Haira (ハイラ) / Hylaria Aira Mirarasta (ハイラリア・アイラ・ミララスタ, Hairaria Aira Mirarasuta)
Voiced by: Mamiko Noto
Known as Uramimi Hime no Mikoto (麗耳毘売命), and by her nickname "Haira", she is the enshrined deity of Uramimi Shrine summoned by Lord Maeda Toshiie. At the age of 726, she is the oldest of the three elves summoned to this world, thus her demanding that Elda call her "onee-sama". She has a gambling addiction, much to the partial dismay of her miko.
Isuzu Koimari (小伊万里 いすず, Koimari Isuzu)
Voiced by: Kana Ichinose
She is Haira's caretaker who is the same age as Koito. She is also a famous influencer, of which Koito is a fan of. Though she scolds Haira for her gambling, she loves to take photo portraits of her and spends all of her allowance printing them at a print shop as a hobby.

== Media ==
=== Manga ===
Written and illustrated by Akihiko Higuchi, Otaku Elf began serialization in Kodansha's Shōnen Magazine Edge on June 17, 2019. After the magazine ended publication on October 18, 2023, the series was transferred to the Comic Days website starting on December 20. As of June 2026, 13 tankōbon volumes have been published. In North America, Seven Seas Entertainment has licensed the series in print and digital formats.

=== Anime ===
An anime television series adaptation was announced in June 2022. It was produced by C2C and directed by Takebumi Anzai, with scripts written by Shōgo Yasukawa, character designs handled by Takeshi Oda, who also serves as chief animation director, and music composed by Akito Matsuda. The series aired from April 8 to June 24, 2023, on the Animeism programming block on MBS and other affiliates. (Note: MBS listed the series premiere at 26:25 on April 7, 2023, which is effectively April 8 at 2:25 a.m.) The opening theme, "Kien Romance" (奇縁ロマンス), was performed by Nanawo Akari, and the ending theme, "Odoru Hikari" (おどる ひかり), was performed by Cody Lee. Sentai Filmworks licensed the series, and they streamed it on Hidive. Medialink licensed the series in Asia-Pacific and they streamed on the Ani-One Asia YouTube channel.

==== Episodes ====
No.	Title (Note: All English titles are taken from Hidive.)	Directed by	Written by	Storyboarded by	Original release date
1	"The Elf of Tokyo"; Transliteration: "Tōkyō no Erufu no Hanashi" (Japanese: 東京のエルフのはなし)	Ayaka Tsujihashi	Shōgo Yasukawa	Takebumi Anzai	April 8, 2023 (Note: This episode aired at 2:53 a.m. JST, 28 minutes after the original air time.)
Koito Koganei is the miko of the Takamimi Shrine and cares for the goddess Takamimi Hime no Mikoto, who in reality is a hikikomori otaku elf named Elda who was summoned by Koito's ancestor 400 years ago. Despite this, Elda is beloved by the locals. Koito has vague memories of a woman in white from her childhood who helped her cope with her mother's death. Koito suspects Elda is popular because her immortality makes her a comforting presence. Koito later learns from Elda she became a hikikomori after a child insulted her 60 years ago. They argue about Elda's selfishness so Koito resigns. Koito returns to the park where she met the woman in white. She suddenly realizes that as an immortal, Elda eventually loses everyone she cares about and stays inside to avoid that pain. Elda goes outside for the first time in years to find Koito. Elda reveals she became a goddess at the request of her good friend Tokugawa Ieyasu. She also reveals it has been ten years since she visited the park with Koito, causing Koito to realize Elda was the woman in white.
2	"Let's Go to Monja Street"; Transliteration: "Ikō ze, Monja Sutorīto" (Japanese: いこうぜ、もんじゃストリート)	Yoshihiko Iwata	Shōgo Yasukawa	Takebumi Anzai	April 15, 2023 (Note: This episode aired at 2:23 a.m. JST, 2 minutes before the original air time.)
Elda practices speaking with people again by thanking Koyuzu, Koito's younger sister, who cooks Elda's meals. Elda spends a lot of money completing a set of toys from a restaurant chain, causing Koito to worry she is gaining weight. As Elda is seeing more people, Koito invites her best friend Koma Sakuraba to the shrine. Elda is unsure about her outgoing personality, but they get along talking about her toys, with Elda revealing she has enjoyed collecting free merchandise since the Edo period when pharmacists gave out free woodblock prints with medicine purchases. Elda is sad that one of the toys she is missing is only sold by collectors at inflated prices. Koma reveals a shop by her house sells old toys and is able to buy the toy for Elda cheaply. Koito and Elda disagree on whether Tsukishima's cultural meal is monjayaki or tsukudani and it transpires Elda has been isolated for so long the old names of foods have changed and some modern foods she has never tried before. Elda is convinced to visit a monja restaurant for dinner. However, she eats so much it costs Koito her entire week's miko wages.
3	"The New Priestess and the Ritual of Succession"; Transliteration: "Shinmai Miko to Keishō no Gi" (Japanese: 新米巫女と継承の儀)	Tsuyoshi Nagasawa	Shōgo Yasukawa	Takebumi Anzai	April 22, 2023 (Note: This episode aired at 2:38 a.m. JST, 13 minutes after the original air time.)
Elda orders a limited edition pudding, marveling that thanks to delivery services, products can be sent anywhere all year. Elda recalls the first delivery service in the Edo period. Elda and Koito begin indulging on Elda's stash of limited edition cakes, pastries, snacks and drinks and are scolded by Koyuzu when they are too full to eat dinner. Koito undergoes her succession ritual where she and Elda walk the streets at night to formally introduce herself as Elda's new miko. The ritual is personally precious to Elda, surprising Koito that Elda willingly spends so long outdoors. Their route ends at a convenience store and Koito furiously learns the entire ritual began 400 years ago when Elda forced the first miko to get ramen for her late at night, and has no spiritual relevance at all. Elda reveals the ramen Koito picked is the same one her mother Sayoko chose during her succession, making Koito slightly happier about the ritual. At another shrine elsewhere in Japan, an elf named Yord and her miko Himawari decide to visit Elda.
4	"The Elf Battle of All Times and Places"; Transliteration: "Kokon Tōzai Erufu Kassen" (Japanese: 古今東西エルフ合戦)	Masahiko Watanabe	Shōgo Yasukawa	Noriaki Saitō	April 29, 2023
While shopping, Koito encounters Yord crying as Himawari is missing. Seeing she is an elf like Elda, Koito invites her to the shrine where Himawari had already gone looking for her. Elda is extremely uncomfortable around Yord; they were summoned at the same time but by two different summoners in different cities, and despite Yord's childlike appearance, she is older than Elda and has a habit of tormenting her. Yord insists on settling their elven duel, Ringberry Bjorling, which turns out to be just tic-tac-toe in which they have been in a stalemate for 400 years, but only because the more intelligent Elda cannot handle Yold's tantrum should she actually beat her. Yold and Himawari abruptly leave, having only visited on their way to a concert in Tokyo, leaving Elda and Koito exhausted. Elda ends up catching an elvish cold from Yord. Koito discovers Elda has been a patient at the same nearby clinic since the Edo period. She later attempts to make rice porridge, but Koyuzu already made Elda pork cutlets. Elsewhere, Yord's cold is much worse and she craves meat skewers. Himawari suspects elves must crave fried food when sick.
5	"Tsukishima Girls' Collection"; Transliteration: "Tsukishima Gāruzu Korekushon" (Japanese: 月島ガールズコレクション)	Yoshihiko Iwata	Shōgo Yasukawa	Takebumi Anzai	May 6, 2023
Elda overworks the spirits she uses to send psychic messages, so Koito gives her a smartphone. Elda is embarrassed to recall how in the Edo period, she and Yord used the express messenger service founded by Tokugawa Ieyasu to aid his Unification of Japan to pass childish jokes back and forth. When she eventually realizes her spirits are sulking from being neglected, Elda gives up texting and resumes using psychic messages. Trying to appear mature, Koito buys a coat for her coming of age ceremony that does not suit her. For fun, Koito and Koma dress Elda in the coat, making her look like a fashion model. Koito actually becomes flustered when Elda trips and traps her against a wall. Elda is uncomfortable around fashion since there was a time in the Edo period where extravagant clothes were illegal. For her ceremony, Elda gives Koito the shrine's furisode, a stunning antique kimono passed down from Koito's mother, grandmother and great-grandmother all the way back to Elda's first miko 400 years ago. Seeing Koito try it on, Elda wishes Koito did not have to grow up so fast.
6	"Stand by Me"	Naoki Horiuchi	Shōgo Yasukawa	Noriaki Saitō	May 13, 2023
Koito decides to spend more time studying, causing Elda to worry Koito is sick of her. She frets further when Koito buys an academic achievement charm from another shrine. Seeing Koito study Elda recalls when she was summoned she had to learn Japanese at a temple school. Due to boredom, Elda keeps interrupting Koito until she realizes she can ask Elda all about history since she lived through it. Unfortunately, Elda's stories are tainted by complaints about how hard life was back then. Koito ends up passing her test when Elda impulsively offers to pay for sushi as a reward. An important ritual held every fifty years to honor Mt. Fuji distresses Elda as it is at the tallest point in Tokyo, the Tokyo Skytree, and Elda is scared of heights. To distract herself, Elda recalls how the name Mt. Fuji was inspired by The Tale of the Bamboo Cutter. Even though mikos are forbidden to enter the sanctuary with Elda, she insists Koito stays. The occasion is slightly ruined when Elda prays for Koito to be nicer to her, while Koito prays Elda stops buying so many expensive games.
7	"The Aroma of the Town"; Transliteration: "Machi no Nioi wa" (Japanese: 街の匂いは)	Ayaka Tsujihashi	Shōgo Yasukawa	Kagetsu Aizawa	May 20, 2023
Koyuzu is given homework to write about old games. Elda teaches her about takoage, big sister dolls, and origami in which Elda is a 400 year expert. Elda's particular favorite from the Edo period was blowing soap bubbles. After playing all afternoon, Koyuzu admits she did not have homework, she just wanted Koito's attention. Elda has a nightmare caused by her inability to obtain a super rare toy. By coincidence, the toy is the fifth place prize in the upcoming shopping arcade raffle, but entry requires five stamps from arcade stores. Forced to collect the stamps, Elda realizes many locals still grow Daphne odora in her honor for its symbolism of immortality. After collecting the last stamp from Kadoi and a drunk Akane at the monja restaurant, Elda heads to the raffle. Kadoi soon realizes Akane already won the toy earlier and manages to convince the organizers to rig the raffle and let Elda believe she won it fairly. While Elda is pleased to win the toy, Koito is disappointed she missed the first place prize, a Hawaiian vacation.
8	"Her and the Elf's Situation"; Transliteration: "Kanojo to Erufu no Jijō" (Japanese: 彼女とエルフの事情)	Fumihiro Ueno	Shōgo Yasukawa	Noriaki Saitō	May 27, 2023
The shrine is visited by another elf, Haira, who was summoned to Kanazawa by Lord Maeda Toshiie in the 1500s. She insists she is Yord and Elda's big sister as she is 100 years older than them. Koito is amazed with Haira's maturity. Haira is having trouble with her miko who is experiencing teenage rebellion and hopes Koito will become friends with her. It transpires that Haira lost the money her miko gave her, with Elda revealing Haira's gambling addiction since the Edo period. Haira's miko also arrives, Isuzu Koimari, a social media influencer Koito admires, but she turns out to be antisocial with no real interest in her miko duties. While Haira goes to great lengths preventing Isuzu from discovering she lost their money, Isuzu eventually learns what happened. Once she calms down, she secretly reveals to Koito her own expensive hobby of producing photographic portraits of Haira, whom she actually deeply admires. Before Haira and Isuzu leave, Koito reassures Isuzu when she expresses her worry about how their inevitable deaths will effect Elda and Haira.
9	"Time After Time"	Yoshihiko Iwata	Shōgo Yasukawa	Noriaki Saitō	June 3, 2023
Koito discovers Elda loves the rain because it allows her to laze around. However, when a leaky roof threatens Elda's collection, she is forced to allow a carpenter into her room. Elda is amazed at modern raincoats since in the Edo period they only had oil-paper umbrellas. Once the rain stops, Koito, Koyuzu, and Elda go outside so they can enjoy the smell of fresh rain. Due to the mess that was made, Koito decides to rearrange Elda's closet, but is delayed by Elda rediscovering toys she has not seen in decades. Elda is reminded of the Edo period's Susuhaki, a traditional day of cleaning on December 13 to sweep away soot. They find old videotapes, including a Betamax of the shrine from 20 years ago. Watching it, Koito finds Elda has not changed at all. She then unexpectedly sees the previous miko, her mother Sayako as a teenager, upsetting her. Elda unintentionally cheers her up by offering to lift her into the air, the traditional symbolic ending of Susuhaki, but Koito refuses as it is embarrassing.
10	"The Elves and Miko of 3 Cities"; Transliteration: "Mittsu no Miyako no Erufu to Miko no Hanashi" (Japanese: みっつの都のエルフと巫女のはなし)	Michita Shiraishi	Shōgo Yasukawa	Shinpei Nagai	June 10, 2023
Elda wakes up at 10 am, games all day, avoids people, performs a few shrine duties and stays awake gaming until 4am. Koito concludes it is actually a pretty sad existence. Yord avoids her duties and is scolded by Himawari. They discuss the foods they want to try the next time they visit Elda. They also wonder if they should try to drop their Osaka dialects and learn the standard dialect spoken by Elda, which Yord fails horribly. Isuzu is excited she will soon publish her 200th album of Haira photographs, but she needs the most special photograph yet for the cover. She catches Haira planning to gamble despite already owing Isuzu money she borrowed. Haira tends her garden, which Isuzu notes only contains edible plants to make up for gambling away their grocery money. Haira takes an amateur selfie of them which Isuzu ends up using as her album's cover. Koito starts working at 5 am for morning shrine duties and attempts to wake Elda before going to school. After school, she works the shrine's visitor shop and performs ceremonies with Elda. After dinner and a bath, she spends time with Elda and goes to bed at 11pm.
11	"Detective Koma-chan"; Transliteration: "Meitantei Koma-chan" (Japanese: 名探偵コマちゃん)	Yoshihiko Iwata	Shōgo Yasukawa	Takebumi Anzai	June 17, 2023
When Elda cannot find her rare Gongnam model, she tells Koito and Koma she think a burglar has entered her room. They then decide to find it while Koma plays detective. Koito later confesses she inadvertently stepped on the model while she was cleaning up Elda's room. A mock trial is held with Kadoi and Akane acting as jurors. Though the jurors say it was Elda's fault because her room was messy, Koito insists on being punished. Elda decides to make Koito watch all the episodes of Gongnam with her. The Yumimimi Festival is in a week and Koito is busy. It includes for the first time in ten years the Oyumi ritual, where an arrow is shot from a boat towards a target on the shore which will determine how bountiful the fish harvest will be. After a brief discussion on how Tokugawa Ieyasu turned Tokyo into a progressive city, Koito gives it a try, but she is a bad shot. Worse, Koyuzu reveals Koito has to do the ritual herself after their grandfather hurt himself, much to Koito and Elda's shock.
12	"This Is My Shrine Deity"; Transliteration: "Kore ga Watashi no Gosaijin" (Japanese: これが私のご祭神)	Yoshifumi Sasahara	Shōgo Yasukawa	Takebumi Anzai	June 24, 2023
After a few more practice sessions, Koito proceeds with the Oyuki ritual and misses the first two shots. On the third try, she points the arrow skyward and fires. To everyone's shock, Elda jumps off the boat she is standing on and catches it with the target she is holding, which hits right in the middle. The parishioners offer a food stall gourmet as a result. Days later, Elda has been encountering one bad situation after the other. Fearing she is cursed, she decides to purify herself by doing the Tsujiura ritual with Koito, but when Koyuzu comes along asking what Elda would want for dinner, she has an "oracle". Elda then asks Koyuzu for a sea bream dinner, with the aim of making its cheekbones as a lucky charm. All Koyuzu had was mackerel, though, but it is enough. They put it to the test using the fortune telling slips. With a bit of encouragement from Koito and Koyuzu, Elda gets a good fortune slip. However, they are busted by Koito and Koyuzu's grandfather.

== Reception ==
Alex Henderson of Anime Feminist reviewed the first episode, stating that the series understands the importance of having "endearing character dynamics and deeper themes", with Elda not only loving gaming, but has a "deep sense of care for the community" she cares for, and described it as a supernatural comedy with silliness grounded in characters that are not "one-off jokes", without any fan service.

Burkeley Hermann of Pop Culture Maniacs appreciated the "slice-of-life nature" of the anime, stating how that "makes it different from magic-themed series such as Healer Girl and Management of a Novice Alchemist."
