= Akari Nanawo =

Japanese musician (born 1995)

Nanawo Akari ナナヲ アカリ
- Born: November 12, 1995 (age 30); Abeno, Osaka, Japan
- Genres: Rock, denpa song
- Years active: 2011–present
- Label: Sony Music Associated Records (2018–present)
- Spouse: Akira Akirakani (m. 2025)
- Website: www.nanawoakari.com

Akari Nanawo (ナナヲ アカリ, Nanawo Akari; born November 12, 1995), also known as Nanaoakari is a Japanese musician and YouTuber from Osaka who is signed to Sony Music Associated Records. Starting her career as an independent musician in 2011, Akari gained a following performing at various live houses in Japan, as well as through uploading songs on the website Niconico. She was also cast in a stage play adaptation of the mobile game Fate/Grand Order. She made her major debut in 2018, performing the opening theme to the anime television series Happy Sugar Life. She released her first full album in October of that year.

== Early life and career ==
Akari was born in Osaka on November 12, 1995. She had been interested in music for much of her life, and in junior high school, she primarily listened to anison and Vocaloid music. In particular, she had become a major fan of the dōjin music producer Deco*27. She was inspired to become a singer after listening to the music of Bump of Chicken and discovering YouTube.

Akari made her debut as a singer in 2011, performing in an indie band which held live shows throughout Japan. After the band broke up, she pursued a solo career. In 2014, Akari beat over 5,000 others who had participated in an audition held by Sony Music Artists. In 2016, she began uploading dōjin music on the Japanese video-sharing website Niconico. She also became the second host of the music program Rock Brothers in January. She self-released her debut EP Shiawase ni Naritai in September 2016 and her second EP Nekuraroid no Tsukurikata in November. She quickly gained a following on Niconico: as of March 2018, her videos had been viewed at least 9 million times. She also began collaborating with other dōjin artists for her songs, including Deco*27. In 2017, she was cast as the character Mash Kyrielight in Fate/Grand Order: The Stage – Shinsei Entaku Ryōiki Camelot, a stage play adaptation of the mobile game Fate/Grand Order. She reprised the role in the sequel stage plays Zettai Majū Sensen Babylonia (2019) and Kani Jikan Shinden Solomon (2020).

During a live performance in Tokyo, in March 2018, Akari announced that she would make her major debut under Sony Music Associated Records later that year. Her first single, "One Room Sugar Life/Nantoka Narukunai?/Ai no Uta Nante" was released on August 22, 2018; the song "One Room Sugar Life" is used as the opening theme to the anime television series Happy Sugar Life. The single peaked at #33 on Oricon's weekly charts and charted for nine weeks. She released her first major album Flying Best: Shiranaino? Chimata de Uwasa no Dame Tenshi on October 3, 2018. Her second major single, "Turing Love feat. Sou/Piyo" was released on February 5, 2020; the song "Turing Love" is used as the ending theme to the anime television series Science Fell in Love, So I Tried to Prove It. Her third major single "Higher's High" was released on October 21, 2020; the title song is used as the opening theme to the anime television series Warlords of Sigrdrifa.

In 2022, she had her first overseas performance at Anime Festival Asia Singapore 2022.

Two of her songs, "Love Brain" and "Good Luck to Me Tomorrow", are included in the 2026 video game Forza Horizon 6's in-game radio station Gacha City Radio.

== Personal life ==
On February 27, 2025, Nanawo and the Oral Cigarettes's bass guitarist Akira Akirakani jointly announced their marriage.

== Discography ==
=== Independent releases ===
==== Extended plays ====
List of EPs, with selected details and chart positions
Title	EP details	Peak chart positions		
Title	EP details	JPN	JPN Comb.	JPN Hot
Shiawase ni Naritai (しあわせになりたい)	Released: September 22, 2016; Label: Self-released; Formats: CD, digital download, streaming	—	—	—
Nekuraroid no Tsukurikata (ネクラロイドのつくりかた)	Released: November 5, 2016; Label: Self-released; Formats: CD, digital download, streaming	—	—	—
Nekuraroid no Aishikata (ネクラロイドのあいしかた)	Released: August 22, 2017; Label: Self-released; Formats: CD, digital download, streaming	—	—	— (Note: Nekuraroid no Aishikata did not enter the Hot Albums chart but peaked at number 85 on the Top Albums Sales chart.)
Iroiro Iukedo Ii ne ga Hoshii (いろいろいうけど「♡」(いいね)がほしい)	Released: February 14, 2018; Label: Self-released; Formats: CD, digital download, streaming	—	—	— (Note: Iroiro Iukedo Ii ne ga Hoshii did not enter the Hot Albums chart but peaked at number 66 on the Top Albums Sales chart.)
"—" denotes an EP that did not chart or was not eligible to chart.

=== Major releases ===
==== Full albums ====
List of full albums, with selected details and chart positions
Title	Album details	Peak chart positions		
Title	Album details	JPN	JPN Comb.	JPN Hot
Flying Best: Shiranaino? Chimata de Uwasa no Dame Tenshi (フライングベスト〜知らないの？巷で噂のダメ天使〜)	Released: October 3, 2018; Label: Sony Music Associated Records; Formats: CD, digital download, streaming	15	— (Note: Flying Best: Shiranaino? Chimata de Uwasa no Dame Tenshi did not enter the Oricon Combined Albums Chart but peaked at number eight on the Digital Albums Chart.)	14
Nanakorobi Nanaoki (七転七起)	Released: December 9, 2020; Label: Sony Music Associated Records; Formats: CD, digital download, streaming	24	27	21
"—" denotes an album that did not chart or was not eligible to chart.

==== Extended plays ====
List of EPs, with selected details and chart positions
Title	EP details	Peak chart positions		
Title	EP details	JPN	JPN Comb.	JPN Hot
Shiawase Syndrome (しあわせシンドローム)	Released: April 10, 2019; Label: Sony Music Associated Records; Formats: CD, digital download, streaming	16	20	20
Dameleon	Released: October 2, 2019; Label: Sony Music Associated Records; Formats: CD, digital download, streaming	20	23	16
Manga Mitai na Koibito ga Hoshii (マンガみたいな恋人がほしい)	Released: April 8, 2020; Label: Sony Music Associated Records; Formats: CD, digital download, streaming	17	20	19
Doping!!!!!!	Released: February 21, 2024; Label: Sony Music Associated Records; Formats: CD, digital download, streaming	44	—	41
"—" denotes an EP that did not chart or was not eligible to chart.

==== Best-of albums ====
List of best-of albums, with selected details and chart positions
Title	Album details	Peak chart positions		
Title	Album details	JPN	JPN Comb.	JPN Hot
Flying Best 2 (フライングベスト2)	Released: August 20, 2025; Label: Sony Music Associated Records; Formats: CD, digital download, streaming	22	— (Note: Flying Best 2 did not enter the Oricon Combined Albums Chart but peaked at number 20 on the Digital Albums Chart.)	— (Note: Flying Best 2 did not enter the Hot Albums chart but peaked at number 26 on the Download Albums chart.)
"—" denotes an album that did not chart or was not eligible to chart.

==== Singles ====
List of singles, with selected chart positions, certifications, and associated album
Title	Year	Peak chart positions			Certifications	Album
Title	Year	JPN	JPN Comb.	JPN Hot (Note: For multiple A-side singles, each row corresponds to the chart position of each track in the single.)	Certifications	Album
"One Room Sugar Life" (ワンルームシュガーライフ) "Nantoka Narukunai?" (なんとかなるくない？) "Ai no Uta Nante" (愛の歌なんて) (triple A-side single)	2018	33	—	90		Flying Best: Shiranaino? Chimata de Uwasa no Dame Tenshi and Flying Best 2
"One Room Sugar Life" (ワンルームシュガーライフ) "Nantoka Narukunai?" (なんとかなるくない？) "Ai no Uta Nante" (愛の歌なんて) (triple A-side single)	2018	33	—	—		Flying Best: Shiranaino? Chimata de Uwasa no Dame Tenshi
"One Room Sugar Life" (ワンルームシュガーライフ) "Nantoka Narukunai?" (なんとかなるくない？) "Ai no Uta Nante" (愛の歌なんて) (triple A-side single)	2018	33	—	—		—N/a
"Turing Love" (チューリングラブ) (featuring Sou) "Piyo" (ピヨ) (double A-side single)	2020	13	44	91	RIAJ (streaming): Gold	Nanakorobi Nanaoki and Flying Best 2
"Turing Love" (チューリングラブ) (featuring Sou) "Piyo" (ピヨ) (double A-side single)	2020	13	44	—		—N/a
"Higher's High"	2020	15	—	— (Note: "Higher's High" did not enter the Japan Hot 100 but peaked at number 39 on the Download Songs chart.)		Nanakorobi Nanaoki and Flying Best 2
"Raika" (雷火; lit. 'Lightning Flash') "Magic" (魔法, Mahō) (double A-side single)	2021	27	—	—		Flying Best 2
"Raika" (雷火; lit. 'Lightning Flash') "Magic" (魔法, Mahō) (double A-side single)	2021	27	—	—		Flying Best 2
"Love Brain" (恋愛脳, Renai Nō) "Higasa" (陽傘; lit. 'Sun Umbrella') (double A-side single)	2022	21	—	— (Note: "Love Brain" did not enter the Japan Hot 100 but peaked at number 76 on the Download Songs chart.)		Flying Best 2
"Love Brain" (恋愛脳, Renai Nō) "Higasa" (陽傘; lit. 'Sun Umbrella') (double A-side single)	2022	21	—	—		Flying Best 2
"Kien Romance" (奇縁ロマンス; lit. 'Strange Coincidence Romance')	2023	32	—	— (Note: "Kien Romance" did not enter the Japan Hot 100 but peaked at number 35 on the Download Songs chart.)		Flying Best 2
"Seikai wa Iranai" (正解はいらない; lit. 'Correct Answer Isn't Needed')	2024	40	—	— (Note: "Seikai wa Iranai" did not enter the Japan Hot 100 but peaked at number 96 on the Download Songs chart.)		Flying Best 2
"Blueprint" (ブループリント)	2024	—	—	—		Flying Best 2
"Good Luck to Me Tomorrow" (明日の私に幸あれ, Ashita no Watashi ni Sachi Are)	2025	25	—	96		Flying Best 2
"Muri Muri Evolution" (ムリムリ進化論, Muri Muri Shinkaron)	2025	50	—	— (Note: "Muri Muri Evolution" did not enter the Japan Hot 100 but peaked at number 41 on the Download Songs chart.)		Flying Best 2
"Boys & Girls" (ボーイゼンガールズ) "Infinity Inferior Star" (∞劣等星, ∞Rettōsei) (double A-side single)	2026	—	—	—		TBA
"Boys & Girls" (ボーイゼンガールズ) "Infinity Inferior Star" (∞劣等星, ∞Rettōsei) (double A-side single)	2026	—	—	— (Note: "Infinity Inferior Star" did not enter the Japan Hot 100 but peaked at number 67 on the Download Songs chart.)		TBA
"Pit" (ぴ, Pi)	2026	—	—	— (Note: "Pit" did not enter the Japan Hot 100 but peaked at number 35 on the Download Songs chart.)		TBA
"—" denotes a single that did not chart or was not eligible to chart.
