= A Certain Magical Index =

Japanese light novel series

- First light novel volume cover, featuring Index

とある魔術の禁書目録(インデックス) (Toaru Majutsu no Indekkusu)
- Genre: Fantasy, science fiction
- Created by: Kazuma Kamachi
- Light novel
- Written by: Kazuma Kamachi
- Illustrated by: Kiyotaka Haimura
- Published by: MediaWorks (2004–2008); ASCII Media Works (2008–2010)
- English publisher: NA: Yen Press
- Imprint: Dengeki Bunko
- Original run: April 10, 2004 – October 10, 2010
- Volumes: 22
Further information
Manga
Written by	Kazuma Kamachi
Illustrated by	Chuya Kogino
Published by	Square Enix
English publisher	NA: Yen Press
Magazine	Monthly Shōnen Gangan
Original run	April 12, 2007 – present
Volumes	34
Light novel
A Certain Magical Index SS
Written by	Kazuma Kamachi
Illustrated by	Kiyotaka Haimura
Published by	ASCII Media Works
English publisher	NA: Yen Press
Imprint	Dengeki Bunko
Original run	July 10, 2007 – November 10, 2008
Volumes	2
Video game
Developer	Shade
Publisher	ASCII Media Works
Genre	Fighting game
Platform	PlayStation Portable
Released	JP: January 27, 2011
Light novel
A Certain Magical Index: New Testament
Written by	Kazuma Kamachi
Illustrated by	Kiyotaka Haimura
Published by	ASCII Media Works
English publisher	NA: Yen Press
Imprint	Dengeki Bunko
Original run	March 10, 2011 – July 10, 2019
Volumes	23
Light novel
A Certain Magical Index SP
Written by	Kazuma Kamachi
Illustrated by	Kiyotaka Haimura
Published by	ASCII Media Works
Imprint	Dengeki Bunko
Published	August 10, 2011
Volumes	1
Video game
A Certain Magical Index: Struggle Battle
Developer	Heroz
Publisher	ASCII Media Works
Genre	Social card game
Platform	Android iOS
Released	JP: December 25, 2012
Video game
A Certain Magical and Scientific Ensemble
Developer	Guyzware
Publisher	Namco Bandai Games
Genre	Visual novel
Platform	PlayStation Portable; PlayStation Vita
Released	JP: February 21, 2013
Manga
A Certain Everyday Index-san
Written by	Kazuma Kamachi
Illustrated by	Mijin Kouka
Published by	Square Enix
Magazine	Monthly Shōnen Gangan
Original run	September 12, 2013 – May 12, 2016
Volumes	5
Video game
A Certain Magical and Scientific Puzzdex
Developer	Heroz
Publisher	ASCII Media Works
Genre	Action puzzle game
Platform	Android iOS
Released	Android: JP: March 16, 2014; iOS: JP: April 2014
Light novel
A Certain Magical Index × Cyber Troopers Virtual-On: A Certain Magical Virtual-On
Written by	Kazuma Kamachi
Illustrated by	Hajime Katoki; Kiyotaka Haimura
Published by	ASCII Media Works
Imprint	Dengeki Bunko
Published	May 10, 2016
Volumes	1
Manga
A Certain Magical Index × Cyber Troopers Virtual-On: A Certain Magical Virtual-On
Written by	Kazuma Kamachi
Illustrated by	Hibipon
Published by	ASCII Media Works
Magazine	Monthly Denplay Comic
Original run	December 28, 2017 – May 28, 2019
Volumes	3
Video game
A Certain Magical Virtual-On
Developer	Access Games
Publisher	Sega
Genre	Fighting game
Platform	PlayStation 4 PlayStation Vita
Released	JP: February 15, 2018
Video game
A Certain Magical Index: Imaginary Fest
Developer	Headlock
Publisher	Square Enix
Genre	Role-playing game
Platform	Android iOS
Released	JP: July 4, 2019
Light novel
A Certain Magical Index: Genesis Testament
Written by	Kazuma Kamachi
Illustrated by	Kiyotaka Haimura
Published by	ASCII Media Works
Imprint	Dengeki Bunko
Original run	February 7, 2020 – present
Volumes	16
Light novel
A Certain Magical Index: Apocrypha Archive
Written by	Kazuma Kamachi
Illustrated by	Kiyotaka Haimura; Motoi Fuyukawa
Published by	ASCII Media Works
Imprint	Dengeki Bunko
Original run	June 10, 2020 – February 7, 2025
Volumes	4
Anime television series
A Certain Magical Index (2008–2019)
Other
A Certain Magical Index: The Movie – The Miracle of Endymion; A Certain Scientific Railgun; A Certain Scientific Railgun: Astral Buddy; A Certain Scientific Accelerator; A Certain Scientific Dark Matter; A Certain Scientific Mental Out; A Certain Dark Item
- icon

A Certain Magical Index (Japanese: とある魔術の禁書目録(インデックス), Hepburn: Toaru Majutsu no Indekkusu) (Note: The kanji 禁書目録 in the Japanese title, glossed with furigana as Indekkusu (インデックス), are normally read as Kinsho Mokuroku (the Japanese name for the Index Librorum Prohibitorum).) is a Japanese light novel series written by Kazuma Kamachi and illustrated by Kiyotaka Haimura, which has been published by ASCII Media Works under their Dengeki Bunko imprint since April 2004 in a total of three separate series. The first ran from April 2004 to October 2010, the second from March 2011 to July 2019, and the third from February 2020 to present.

The plot is set in a world where humans called espers possess supernatural abilities. The light novels focus on Toma Kamijo, a young high school student in Academy City with the ability to cancel other espers' powers, as he encounters an English nun named Index. His ability, which allows him to cancel other powers by touching them, and his relationship with Index prove dangerous to other sorcerers and espers who wanted to discover the secrets behind him and Index, as well as the city.

After being rejected for the Dengeki Novel Prize, Kamachi was contacted by Kazuma Miki, an editor at ASCII Media Works who had him write several test novels. He got the chance to write a full series and decided to create it with the concept of exploring the rules of magic, rather than just having it exist, and the inclusion of science to oppose its elements. The resulting series has seen success with both critics and audiences, with critics praising the action and characters.

A manga adaptation by Chuya Kogino began serialization in Monthly Shōnen Gangan in April 2007. J.C.Staff produced two 24-episode anime television series between 2008 and 2011. An animated film was released in February 2013. A 26-episode third season aired between 2018 and 2019. Several spin-offs and other adaptations have also been made, including several video games.

== Synopsis ==
=== Setting ===
A Certain Magical Index is set in a world where supernatural abilities are a reality. Individuals who possess special powers acquired via science are called Espers (超能力者, Chōnōryokusha). Those Espers who gain their abilities without the aid of special scientific instruments, whether at birth or otherwise, are referred to as Gemstones (原石, Genseki). Others, known as Sorcerers (魔術師, Majutsushi), gain their powers upon mastering the power of magic, either from obtaining knowledge from different mythologies or by using mystical artifacts, although the existence of sorcerers is a secret to the public. While Sorcerers align themselves with different beliefs, Espers are aligned with scientific institutions. This leads to a power struggle between the magic and science factions for control of the world.

=== Plot ===
The story is set in Academy City (学園都市, Gakuen Toshi), a technologically advanced independent city-state located in the west of Tokyo, Japan, which is known for its educational and research institutions. Toma Kamijo is a student in Academy City whose right hand's power called the Imagine Breaker could negate any supernatural powers but also his luck, much to his chagrin. One day, Toma meets a young English girl named Index, a nun from Necessarius, a secret magic branch of the Church of England, whose mind had been implanted with the Index Librorum Prohibitorum – 103,000 forbidden magical books the Church stored in secret locations. His encounter with her leads him to meet others from the secret worlds of science and magic. Toma's unusual power places him at the center of conflicts between the Sorcerers and Espers in Academy City who planned to unravel the secrets behind Academy City, Index, and Toma's special power.

Besides its manga adaptation, the series also has spin-offs focusing on the level 5 espers, the top ranked espers in Academy city. One of them is A Certain Scientific Railgun, which focuses on Mikoto Misaka, an Electromaster and the third most powerful Esper in Academy City. The second, A Certain Scientific Accelerator, focuses on Accelerator, a teenager capable of controlling vectors and the most powerful Esper in Academy City. The third, A Certain Scientific Dark Matter, deals with the second most powerful Esper in Academy City named Teitoku Kakine and his past. The fourth, A Certain Scientific Mental Out, follows the fifth Level 5 Esper and most powerful psychological psychic named Misaki Shokuhō in her election campaign for the next president of Tokiwadai Middle School's student body.

== Development ==
Kazuma Kamachi started his work with A Certain Magical Index when he received a call from Kazuma Miki, the light novel editor, after his submission was rejected at the 9th Dengeki Game Novel Prize (now Dengeki Novel Prize) in 2002. Miki began to train him in writing multiple test novels, including a story about a girl sister and a boy with a mysterious arm that became the basis for his light novel.

In his essay titled "If It's Interesting Anything Goes: 600 Million Copies Printed—The Day in the Life of a Certain Editor", Miki stated that the light novel was originally called Last Memory (ラストメモリー, Rasuto Memorī) but he chose the current title because the word "Index" left a "strong personality in the sense and direction" upon his reading of the manuscript. Kamachi revealed that Index's name was derived from the "Kinsho Mokuroku" (禁書目録) kanji he found from looking in the encyclopedia since he wanted a name that would "stand out for the character the story was centered around". He avoided using difficult kanji for Toma Kamijo's name to help readers able to read it but he kept the meaning behind the character's epithet ("The One Who Purifies God and Slays Demons") a secret for now.

When it came the time to write the story, Kamachi investigated the terms "sorcerer" and "real" online for him to build the world of magic and the magicians' existence in his light novel. He also realized that most other Dengeki Bunko novels had magic as a main theme; however, none of them actually invested much into its inner-workings. As such, he decided to use this as the premise for the series. In setting up the world of science, Kamachi "needed some kind of power to oppose" the magic side. This helped him to create the idea of Toma Kamijo's known power, the Imagine Breaker, and set the stage for the world-building of Academy City "where science, espers, and magic would gather".

Upon the release of the first volume of the light novel, Miki stated that "(to be blunt) it sold like crazy. Shortly after the official release date, we had to do a reprint half the size of the original printing. It was on a Monday. I still remember it now. It was quite an achievement for an unknown newcomer". After the success of the first volume, the second volume was completed in 17 days. Subsequent volumes were also completed quickly, with the story for the ninth volume completed before the release of the fifth volume.

== Media ==
=== Light novels ===
A Certain Magical Index is a light novel series written by Kamachi and illustrated by Kiyotaka Haimura. ASCII Media Works published 25 volumes between April 10, 2004, and August 10, 2011, under their Dengeki Bunko imprint; 22 comprise the main story while the other three are short story collections. On May 4, 2021, all volumes were free to read for one day in the Dengeki Novekomi app developed by Kadokawa Corporation. Yen Press licensed the series in North America in April 2014, which began releasing under their Yen On imprint in November, and its omnibus edition in November 2022.

A sequel series, titled A Certain Magical Index: New Testament (新約 とある魔術の禁書目録, Shinyaku Toaru Majutsu no Indekkusu), began publication on March 10, 2011 and concluded on July 10, 2019, with the publication of its 23rd volume. On May 4, 2021, they began to be published in the Dengeki Novekomi app. A third light novel series, titled A Certain Magical Index: Genesis Testament (創約 とある魔術の禁書目録, Sōyaku Toaru Majutsu no Indekkusu), began publication on February 7, 2020. Yen Press has acquired New Testament for English publication.

Kamachi wrote short novels exclusively for Haimura's three artbook collections. The first short novel, titled A Certain Magical Index SS: Love Letter Competition, was included in the release of Kiyotaka Haimura Artbook rainbow spectrum:colors on February 28, 2011. The second short novel, titled New Testament: A Certain Magical Index SS, was included in the release of Kiyotaka Haimura Artbook 2 rainbow spectrum:notes on September 9, 2014. The third short novel, titled Genesis Testament: A Certain Magical Index SS, was included in the release of Kiyotaka Haimura Artbook 3 CROSS on May 9, 2020.

The bonus novels that Kamachi wrote for the series' Blu-ray/DVD releases were compiled into four volumes titled A Certain Magical Index: Apocrypha Archive (とある魔術の禁書目録 外典書庫, Toaru Majutsu no Indekkusu: Gaiten Shoku), with the first two released to commemorate the 15th anniversary of his debut. They were published from June 10, 2020 to February 7, 2025.

A spin-off novel series written by Kamachi and illustrated by Nilitsu focusing on the women belonging to Academy City's dark side, titled A Certain Dark Item (とある暗部の少女共棲(アイテム), Toaru Anbu no Aitemu), (Note: The kanji 少女共棲 in the Japanese title is read as Shōjo Kyōsei.) was announced in January 2023. The first volume was released on March 10, 2023.

=== Manga ===
The series has been adapted into two manga series. The one based on the novels is illustrated by Chuya Kogino and started serialization in the May 2007 issue of Square Enix's Monthly Shōnen Gangan. The first tankōbon volume was released in Japan on November 10, 2007. As of September 11, 2026, 34 volumes have been published. Yen Press has licensed the series in North America and has been publishing the manga since May 19, 2015. The manga is also licensed in Italy by Star Comics.

The other manga adaptation based on A Certain Magical Index: The Movie – The Miracle of Endymion is illustrated by Ryōsuke Asakura and was serialized from February 12 to October 12, 2013. Square Enix published the first volume on August 27 and the second one on October 22.

==== Spin-offs ====
A side-story manga series illustrated by Motoi Fuyukawa, titled A Certain Scientific Railgun, started serialization in the April 2007 issue of Dengeki Daioh. As of March 2023, 18 volumes have been released. Its spin-off, titled A Certain Scientific Railgun: Astral Buddy, was serialized in Dengeki Daioh from April 27, 2017, to July 27, 2020. It was published in four volumes. A second side-story manga series illustrated by Arata Yamaji, titled A Certain Scientific Accelerator, was serialized in Dengeki Daioh from December 27, 2013, to July 27, 2020. It was published in twelve volumes. A third side-story manga series illustrated by Nankyoku Kisaragi, titled A Certain Scientific Dark Matter (とある科学の未元物質, Toaru Kagaku no Dāku Matā), (Note: The official title is A Certain Magical Index Side Story: A Certain Scientific Dark Matter (とある魔術の禁書目録(インデックス)外伝 とある科学の未元物質(ダークマター), Toaru Majutsu no Indekkusu Gaiden: Toaru Kagaku no Dāku Matā).) was serialized in ASCII Media Works magazine Dengeki Daioh from August 27, 2019, to March 26, 2020, (the same day the compiled volume was published). A fourth side-story manga series illustrated by Yasuhito Nogi, titled A Certain Scientific Mental Out (とある科学の心理掌握, Toaru Kagaku no Mentaru Auto), (Note: The official title is A Certain Magical Index Side Story: A Certain Scientific Mental Out (とある魔術の禁書目録(インデックス)外伝 とある科学の心理掌握(メンタルアウト), Toaru Majutsu no Indekkusu Gaiden: Toaru Kagaku no Mentaru Auto).) began serialization in Comic Newtype website on July 27, 2021. As of February 25, 2026, five volumes have been published.

A yonkoma manga spin-off illustrated by Mijin Kouka, titled A Certain Everyday Index-san (とある日常のいんでっくすさん, Toaru Nichijō no Indekkusu-san), was serialized in Square Enix's Monthly Shōnen Gangan magazine from September 12, 2013, to May 12, 2016. A total of five tankōbon volumes had been published in Japan from February 22, 2014, to May 21, 2016. In March 2023, Kamachi revealed the manga adaptation of A Certain Dark Item by Strelka, which is serialized in Dengeki Daioh magazine starting October 26 of that year.

=== Anime ===
A 24-episode anime adaptation of A Certain Magical Index was produced by J.C.Staff and directed by Hiroshi Nishikiori, which was aired in Japan from October 4, 2008, to March 19, 2009. The anime was collected into eight Blu-ray and DVD sets, which were released from January 23 to August 21, 2009.

A second season titled A Certain Magical Index II began airing in Japan from October 8, 2010, to April 1, 2011 and was also streamed on Nico Nico Douga. The second season's eight volumes of Blu-ray/DVD sets were released from January 26 to September 22, 2011.

An animated film titled A Certain Magical Index: The Movie – The Miracle of Endymion (劇場版 とある魔術の禁書目録 エンデュミオンの奇蹟, Gekijōban Toaru Majutsu no Indekkusu: Endyumion no Kiseki) was released in Japan on February 23, 2013. It is based on an original story written by Kamachi and features the main characters from both Index and Railgun anime series, along with the new ones designed by Haimura. The Blu-ray/DVD set of the film, which was released on August 28, is included with a bonus anime titled A Certain Magical Index-tan: The Movie – The Miracle of Endymion... Happened, or Maybe Not.

The 26-episode third season titled A Certain Magical Index III aired in Japan from October 5, 2018, to April 5, 2019. The third season's eight volumes of Blu-ray/DVD sets were released from December 26, 2018 to July 31, 2019, with episodes 6 and 7 of the bonus short anime parody titled A Certain Magical Index-tan, which depicted Index in her chibi form, included in the first and fifth limited edition releases. The third season was originally planned to be a reboot but it was later decided to be a sequel instead. The three seasons were released on Hulu in Japan on March 24, 2022.

In North America, Funimation (which now goes by the name of Crunchyroll LLC) has licensed the series for home video and streaming. An English language dub began streaming on their website in September 2012 and was released on DVD on December 11. The first season aired in North America on the Funimation Channel on January 21, 2013. It can also been seen on the Crunchyroll streaming service after the Funimation brand was unified with the former in 2022.

The series was released in Australia by a partnership between Universal Pictures Home Entertainment and Sony Pictures. Funimation has also licensed the film in North America and released it at theaters in the United States on January 12, 2015. Animatsu Entertainment released the series in the United Kingdom. In Southeast Asia, Muse Communication licensed the series and broadcast it through i-Fun Anime Channel and their YouTube channel.

==== Music ====
Maiko Iuchi of I've Sound is in charge of music for the series' three seasons. The first opening theme music, used in episodes 1–16 of the first season of A Certain Magical Index, is "PSI-Missing", while the second one, used in episode 17 onwards, is "Masterpiece", both performed by Mami Kawada. The first ending theme music, used in episodes 1–19, is "Rimless ~Rimless World~" (Rimless 〜フチナシノセカイ〜, Rimless ~Fuchinashi no Sekai~), while the second one, used in episode 20 onwards, is "Oath ~Just a Little Once More~" (誓い言 ～スコシだけもう一度～, Chikaigoto ~Sukoshi Dake Mō Ichido~), both performed by Iku.

The first opening theme music of A Certain Magical Index II is "No Buts!", while the second one, introduced in episode 17, is "See Visions", both performed by Kawada. The first ending theme music, used in episodes 1–13, is "Magic∞World", while the second one, used in episode 14 onwards, is "Memories Last" (メモリーズ・ラスト, Memorīzu Rasuto), both performed by Kurosaki.

The ending theme music of A Certain Magical Index: The Movie – The Miracle of Endymion is "Fixed Star" by Kawada and the single was released on February 20, 2013. The first opening theme music of A Certain Magical Index III is "Gravitation", while the second one is "Roar", both performed by Kurosaki. The first ending theme music is "Eve of a Revolution" (革命前夜, Kakumei Zenya), while the second one is "The Never-Ending Song" (終わらない歌, Owaranai Uta), both performed by Yuka Iguchi.

=== Video games ===
A 3D fighting game titled A Certain Magical Index was developed by Shade for the PlayStation Portable (PSP) and published by ASCII Media Works on January 27, 2011. Heroz developed a social card game for Mobage titled A Certain Magical Index: Struggle Battle, which was published by ASCII Media Works on December 25, 2012. The game was updated to A Certain Magical Index: Struggle Battle II, but was later announced at the end of its service on March 30, 2018.

Guyzware and Namco Bandai Games announced on June 8, 2012, a collaboration project for a game adaptation of the series, which was revealed to be a crossover visual novel game for PSP between A Certain Magical Index and A Certain Scientific Railgun franchises titled A Certain Magical and Scientific Ensemble. The game was released on February 21, 2013. Heroz also developed an action puzzle game titled A Certain Magical and Scientific Puzzdex, which was published by ASCII Media Works in 2014. NetEase Games developed a massively multiplayer online role-playing game based on the series with supervision from Kadokawa Corporation, titled A Certain Magical Index: Genuine Mobile Game, which was released to the Chinese market in 2017.

On January 4, 2019, Square Enix released a teaser trailer that announced their game titled A Certain Magical Index: Imaginary Fest, which was released on July 4. Fuji Shoji, a Japanese company known for their pachinko and pachislot products, released a teaser trailer on August 24, 2020, for the series' pachinko, which was later launched in November. Sun Electronics adapted it into a mobile game and launched it on December 17, 2020.

=== Other media ===
A radio drama was broadcast in Dengeki Taishō, narrating the story of an encounter with the mysterious self-proclaimed "former" sorcerer by Toma Kamijo and Index in a family restaurant after Mikoto Misaka decided to go back due to urgent business. It was later released as a drama CD, which was included in the mail-in order of the 48th volume of Dengeki hp. The drama CD, which contains a new story about Misaka and Kuroko Shirai with their "urgent business" and a duel request by a Level 3 psychic girl from Tokiwadai Middle School, became available for purchase in December 2007.

Geneon Universal Entertainment (now NBCUniversal Entertainment Japan) released four audio dramas for the first season of Index under the title A Certain Magical Index Archives from March 25 to August 21, 2009. The same enterprise released another four audio dramas for the second season from May 25 to August 24, 2011. A drama CD for A Certain Magical Index III was released as a bonus for customers who purchased the limited edition volume sets of the series via Amazon's Japanese website.

Several characters from A Certain Magical Index cross over with other characters created by Kamachi in his light novel The Circumstance Leading to a Simple Killer Princess' Marriage Was a Certain Magical Heavy Zashiki Warashi, which was published on February 10, 2015. As a collaboration with Sega's Virtual On video game franchise, Kamachi wrote the crossover light novel titled A Certain Magical Index × Cyber Troopers Virtual-On: A Certain Magical Virtual-On (とある魔術の禁書目録×電脳戦機バーチャロン とある魔術の電脳戦機, Toaru Majutsu no Indekkusu × Den'nō Senki Bācharon: Toaru Majutsu no Bācharon) with mecha illustrations designed by Hajime Katoki, which was released on May 10, 2016. One of Kamachi's light novel works, Apocalypse Witch, crosses over with A Certain Magical Index under the title A Certain Magical Index × Apocalypse Witch Collaboration SS (とある魔術の禁書目録×アポカリプス・ウィッチ コラボSS), which was released in May 2020.

A manga adaptation of The Circumstance Leading to a Simple Killer Princess' Marriage Was a Certain Magical Heavy Zashiki Warashi was serialized on Monthly Shōnen Gangan from February 12 to October 10, 2015. The first tankōbon volume was published on November 21, 2015, and the final volume on December 22. A manga adaptation of A Certain Magical Virtual-On began publication in ASCII Media Works' Monthly Denplay Comic magazine from March 10, 2018, to June 26, 2019, with a total of three tankōbon volumes.

The series is featured in Dengeki Gakuen RPG: Cross of Venus for the Nintendo DS, with Index appearing as a supporting character. The series was also adapted into Bushiroad's Weiß Schwarz collectible card game, which was released on April 24, 2010. Index also makes a cameo appearance in the Oreimo PSP game. Sega's Dengeki Bunko: Fighting Climax brings Mikoto Misaka as a playable character, while Toma Kamijo and Accelerator are assist characters. Sega and Dengeki Bunko later collaborated to develop A Certain Magical Virtual-On for the PlayStation 4 and PlayStation Vita, which was released on February 15, 2018. Toma, Mikoto, Accelerator, Kuroko Shirai, and Kazari Uiharu appear as playable characters in Dengeki Bunko: Crossing Void, a 2018 mobile game developed by 91Act and Sega.

== Reception ==
=== Awards ===
The light novel series has consistently ranked in the top ten light novels in Takarajimasha's guidebook Kono Light Novel ga Sugoi!. Notably, the series ranked first in 2011, while also ranking in the top three in 2012, 2013, 2014, and 2017. In 2020, the series was inducted into the hall of fame, thus barred from ranking in future years. Kamachi, Haimura, and several of the series' characters have also ranked in the guidebook, notably with Mikoto Misaka winning the award for best female character nine times in ten years.

In Kadokawa Shoten's Light Novel Award contest held in 2007, A Certain Magical Index was a runner-up in the action category. The series also ranked in Kadokawa Light Novel Expo 2020's top light novels in the infinite passion category.

=== Sales ===
In May 2010, it was reported that A Certain Magical Index became Dengeki Bunko's number one bestseller and it became the first Dengeki Bunko series to sell over 10 million copies. Later that year, it became the fifth best-selling light novel in Japan, beating other popular series such as Full Metal Panic! and Haruhi Suzumiya. It was reported in October 2014 that the entire franchise, including the light novels and manga, had sold over 28 million copies. It was reported in August 2017 that the light novels have sold over 16.35 million copies. In July 2018, the series was reported to have sold over 30 million copies. It was reported with the release of Sorcery Hacker >> Divulge the Magic Vulnerability that the physical sales of the series had reached 18 million copies. As of May 2021, it was reported that the light novel, manga, and spin-off series reached 31 million copies.

=== Critical reception ===
Matthew Warner from The Fandom Post rated the first volume of the light novel an 'A', calling it a "fantastic start". Sean Gaffney from A Case Suitable for Treatment also praised it, calling it a "solid beginning", while also noted that it can be a bit slow at times. Theron Martin from Anime News Network also praised it for the concept, as well as for keeping Toma Kamijo balanced, while also criticizing the illustrations.

Richard Gutierrez from The Fandom Post praised the premise of the manga, but criticized the execution due to the lack of background it provides. Leroy Douresseaux from Comic Book Bin praised the volume he reviewed, stating the art by Chuya Kogino fits the series perfectly. However, Erkael from Manga News was more critical, specifically for the artwork, but he did praise the story and concept.

Chris Beveridge from The Fandom Post praised the anime adaptation, calling it a "fun series" and "pretty engaging". Ian Wolf from Anime UK News also praised the series, specifically for the action, while calling the music "[just] okay". Like Beveridge and Wolf, Carl Kimlinger from Anime News Network also offered praise to the series for the characters and action, while criticizing for being a bit generic at times. Like Kimlinger, Theron Martin from the same website also praised the action and characters, while criticizing it for feeling preachy at times. André Van Renssen from Active Anime called the series "a decent show", comparing it to Shakugan no Shana for its action. Despite that, they also criticized the series for being too violent at times.
