= Shōgo Yasukawa =

Japanese anime screenwriter

- ヤスカワショウゴ
- Occupations: Anime screenwriter, head writer
- Years active: 2007–present
- Notable work: Food Wars!: Shokugeki no Soma

Shōgo Yasukawa (Japanese: ヤスカワショウゴ or 安川正吾, Hepburn: Yasukawa Shōgo) is a Japanese anime scriptwriter and head writer.

== Biography ==
On May 16, 2002, he launched Anime Store (アニメストア) on Amazon Japan.

== Works ==
=== TV anime ===
Year	Title	Role	Ref
2008	Persona: Trinity Soul	Episode Writer	
2012	The Familiar of Zero: F	Head Writer, Episode Writer	
2013	Hyperdimension Neptunia: The Animation	Script Writer, Head Writer	
2014	Invaders of the Rokujouma!?	Episode Writer, Head Writer	
2014	Terra Formars	Episode Writer, Head Writer	
2015	Food Wars!: Shokugeki no Soma	Episode Writer, Head Writer	
2015	Chivalry of a Failed Knight	Episode Writer, Head Writer	
2016	Food Wars! The Second Plate	Episode Writer, Head Writer	
2016	Alderamin on the Sky	Episode Writer, Head Writer	
2017	Alice and Zoroku	Episode Writer	
2017	UQ Holder!	Episode Writer, Head Writer	
2017	Food Wars! The Third Plate	Episode Writer, Head Writer	
2018	Mitsuboshi Colors	Head Writer	
2018	Hakata Tonkotsu Ramens	Episode Writer, Head Writer	
2018	Angolmois: Record of Mongol Invasion	Head Writer	
2018	The Girl in Twilight	Head Writer	
2019	Food Wars! Shokugeki no Soma: The Fourth Plate	Head Writer	
2020	A Certain Scientific Railgun T	Episode Writer, Head Writer	
2020	Food Wars! Shokugeki no Soma: The Fifth Plate	Head Writer	
2022	The Executioner and Her Way of Life	Head Writer	
2023	Ayakashi Triangle	Episode Writer, Head Writer	
2023	My Clueless First Friend	Episode Writer, Head Writer	
2023	Otaku Elf	Episode Writer, Head Writer	
2023	Reign of the Seven Spellblades	Episode Writer, Head Writer	
2024	The Wrong Way to Use Healing Magic	Episode Writer, Head Writer	
2024	Studio Apartment, Good Lighting, Angel Included	Episode Writer, Head Writer	
2024	Quality Assurance in Another World	Episode Writer, Head Writer	
2025	Rock Is a Lady's Modesty	Head Writer	
2026	A Certain Dark Item	Head Writer	
2027	The Moon on a Rainy Night	Episode Writer, Head Writer	

=== Movies ===
Year	Title	Role	Ref
2016	Planetarian: Storyteller of the Stars	Writer (Note: Alongside Naokatsu Tsuda)	
2021	Pretenders	Associate Producer (Note: During Broadcast.)	
2023	Ano ko wo Wasurete	Executive Producer	
2026	Lost Land	Executive Producer	

=== Video games ===
Year	Title	Role	Ref
2000	Phantom of Inferno	Writer	
