= Iku (singer) =

Japanese singer

IKU
- Born: January 22
- Origin: Hokkaido, Japan
- Genres: Pop; trance; psytrance
- Occupations: Singer, songwriter
- Instruments: Vocals, piano
- Years active: 2008–present
- Labels: NBCUniversal (2008–2011); FUCTORY Records (2014–present)
- Website: www.ive.mu/artist_iku.html

Iku (stylized as IKU) is a Japanese singer who was signed to NBCUniversal Entertainment Japan. She debuted in 2008 with the single "Oto no nai Yozora ni/Ko no Me Kaze" (音のない夜空に/木の芽風), produced by the music production group I've Sound. She worked with them only as a guest vocalist initially and the partnership lasted until 2009, when her first album came out, however, in 2014, she officially joined the group.

== Discography ==
=== Albums ===
Title	Year	Formats	Label	Oricon Rank	Sales
Your Wear	2009	CD, digital download	NBCUniversal	91	1,929
ROBE	2011	CD, digital download	NBCUniversal	193	592
TERMINAL	2018	CD, digital download	FUCTORY Records	—	—
"—" denotes items which didn't chart on the Oricon Weekly Album Rank.

=== Singles ===
Title	Year	Formats	Label	Oricon Rank	Sales	Album
Oto no Nai Yozora ni	2008	CD, digital download	NBCUniversal	64	2,891	Your Wear
Ko no Me Kaze	2008	CD, digital download	NBCUniversal	64	2,891	Your Wear
Rimless ~Fuchinashi no Sekai~	2008	CD, digital download	NBCUniversal	55	3,070	Your Wear
Chikaigoto ~Sukoshi Dake Mou Ichido~	2009	CD, digital download	NBCUniversal	70	2,632	Your Wear
Kimi no Namae	2016	CD, digital download	FUCTORY Records	—	—	TERMINAL
"—" denotes items which didn't chart on the Oricon Weekly Single Rank.

== Live performances ==
- I've in Budokan 2009: Departed to the future (January 2, 2009)
- Dengeki Geneon Music festival (September 26, 2010)
- Geneon FripSide festival 2010 (December 5, 2010)
- DK anime complex festival 2011 (January 23, 2011)
