= ClariS discography =

Japanese girl group discography

- Studio albums: 7
- EPs: 3
- Compilation albums: 4
- Singles: 31
- Music videos: 22

The discography of the Japanese girl group ClariS consists of seven studio albums, four compilation albums, three extended plays, and thirty-one singles. The group is composed of three members: Clara, Elly, and Anna, and was formed in 2009.

== Albums ==
=== Studio albums ===
List of albums, showing selected details, selected chart positions, sales figures, and certifications
Title	Album details	Peak chart positions			Certifications (sales thresholds)
Title	Album details	JPN	JPN Comb.	JPN Hot	Certifications (sales thresholds)
Birthday	Released: April 11, 2012; Label: SME (SECL-1111–1113, SECL-1114, SECL-1115–1116); Formats: CD, CD+DVD, CD+CD+Figures, digital download, streaming	2	—	—	RIAJ: Gold
Second Story	Released: June 26, 2013; Label: SME (SECL-1331–1333, SECL-1334–1335, SECL-1336); Formats: CD, CD+DVD, digital download, streaming	6	—	—	
Party Time	Released: June 4, 2014; Label: SME (SECL-1507–1508, SECL-1509–1510, SECL-1511); Format: CD, CD+DVD, digital download, streaming	2	—	—	
Fairy Castle	Released: January 25, 2017; Label: SME (SECL-2106–2107, SECL-2108–2109, SECL-2110); Format: CD, CD+BD, CD+Illustration collection, digital download, streaming	10	—	13	
Fairy Party	Released: November 21, 2018; Label: Sacra Music VVCL-1375–1376, VVCL-1377–1378, VVCL-1379); Format: CD, CD+BD, digital download, streaming	8	—	9	
Parfaitone	Released: April 6, 2022; Label: Sacra Music; Format: CD, digital download, streaming	8	10	9	
Iris	Released: May 15, 2024; Label: Sacra Music; Format: CD, digital download, streaming	10	19	9	
"—" denotes releases that did not chart.

=== Compilation albums ===
Title	Album details	Peak chart positions		
Title	Album details	JPN	JPN Comb.	JPN Hot
ClariS: Single Best 1st	Released: April 15, 2015; Label: SME (SECL-1663, SECL-1657–1658, SECL-1659–1660, SECL-1661–1662); Format: CD, CD+DVD, CD+BD, digital download, streaming	4	—	73
ClariS 10th Anniversary Best: Pink Moon	Released: October 21, 2020; Label: Sacra Music (VVCL-1732, VVCL-1730–1731, VVCL-1736–1738); Format: CD, CD+BD, digital download, streaming	10	11	11
ClariS 10th Anniversary Best: Green Star	Released: October 21, 2020; Label: Sacra Music (VVCL-1735, VVCL-1733–1734, VVCL-1736–1738); Format: CD, CD+BD, digital download, streaming	9	10	9
ClariS: Single Best 2nd	Released: October 23, 2024; Label: Sacra Music; Format: CD, digital download, streaming	12	18	12
"—" denotes releases that did not chart.

== Extended plays ==
Title	Album details	Peak chart positions		
Title	Album details	JPN	JPN Comb.	JPN Hot
Spring Tracks: Haru no Uta	Released: March 2, 2016; Label: SME (SECL-1856, SECL-1857); Format: CD, digital download, streaming	8	—	16
Summer Tracks: Natsu no Uta	Released: August 14, 2019; Label: Sacra Music (VVCL-1470~1, VVCL-1472); Format: CD, digital download, streaming	8	8	9
Winter Tracks: Fuyu no Uta	Released: December 7, 2022; Label: Sacra Music; Format: CD, digital download, streaming	16	23	14
Autumn Tracks: Aki no Uta	Released: October 16, 2024; Label: Sacra Music; Format: CD, digital download, streaming	20	39	17
Links	Scheduled: December 10, 2025; Label: Sacra Music; Formats: CD, CD+BD, digital download, streaming	To be released		
"—" denotes releases that did not chart.

== Singles ==
Title	Year	Peak chart positions			Certifications	Album
Title	Year	JPN	JPN Comb.	JPN Hot	Certifications	Album
"Drop"	2010	— (Note: As a bonus CD released with issues of the anime music magazine LisAni!, these songs were ineligible to chart on the Oricon singles chart.)	—	—		ClariS: Single Best 1st
"Kimi no Yume o Miyō" (君の夢を見よう)	2010	—	—	—		ClariS: Single Best 1st
"Irony"	2010	7	—	55	RIAJ (cellphone): Gold	Birthday
"Connect" (コネクト)	2011	5	—	17	RIAJ (digital): Platinum; RIAJ (physical): Gold; RIAJ (cellphone): Gold; RIAJ (streaming): Gold	Birthday
"Nexus"	2011	5	—	22		Birthday
"Naisho no Hanashi" (ナイショの話)	2012	2	—	6		Birthday
"Wake Up"	2012	12	—	45		Second Story
"Luminous" (ルミナス)	2012	4	—	5	RIAJ (physical): Gold; RIAJ (digital): Gold	Second Story
"Reunion"	2013	2	—	3		Second Story
"Colorful" (カラフル)	2013	3	—	2	RIAJ (digital): Gold	Party Time
"Click"	2014	7	—	11		Party Time
"Step"	2014	3	—	5		Party Time
"Clear Sky"	2014	—	—	—		ClariS: Single Best 1st
"Border" (Note: "Border" is also included on the album Fairy Castle.)	2015	4	—	6		ClariS: Single Best 1st
"Anemone" (アネモネ)	2015	13	—	27		Fairy Castle
"Prism"	2015	25	—	85		Fairy Castle
"Gravity"	2016	25	—	49		Fairy Castle
"Again"	2016	21	—	76		Fairy Castle
"Hitorigoto" (ヒトリゴト)	2017	9	—	13	RIAJ (digital): Gold	Fairy Party
"Shiori"	2017	7	—	30		Fairy Party
"Primalove"	2018	15	—	71		Fairy Party
"CheerS"	2018	13	—	21		Fairy Party
"Alethea / Signal" (アリシア/シグナル)	2020	15	17	66		ClariS 10th Anniversary Best: Green Star
"Fight!!"	2021	12	—	— (Note: "Fight!!" did not enter the Billboard Japan Hot 100 chart but peaked at number 94 on the component Download Songs chart.)		Parfaitone
"Careless" (ケアレス)	2021	8	—	— (Note: "Careless" did not enter the Billboard Japan Hot 100 chart but peaked at number 33 on the component Download Songs chart.)		Parfaitone
"Alive"	2022	8	37	— (Note: "Alive" did not enter the Billboard Japan Hot 100 chart but peaked at number 12 on the component Download Songs chart.)		Iris
"Masquerade"	2022	13	—	—		Iris
"Koi Sekai" (コイセカイ)	2023	20	—	— (Note: "Koi Sekai" did not enter the Billboard Japan Hot 100 chart but peaked at number 90 on the component Download Songs chart.)		Iris
"Folila" (ふぉりら)	2023	13	—	—		Iris
"Andante" (アンダンテ)	2024	17	—	— (Note: "Andante" did not enter the Billboard Japan Hot 100 chart but peaked at number 49 on the component Download Songs chart.)		ClariS: Single Best 2nd
"Umitsuki"	2025	18	—	— (Note: "Umitsuki" did not enter the Billboard Japan Hot 100 chart but peaked at number 48 on the component Download Songs chart.)		TBA
"Revive"	2026					
"Hitokoto" (ヒトコト)	2026					
"Synchro Blue" (シンクロブルー)	2026					
"—" denotes a recording that did not chart.

== Collaborations ==
Title	Year	Peak chart positions		Album
Title	Year	JPN	JPN Hot	Album
"Clever" (with Garnidelia)	2016	21	33	Fairy Castle

== Promotional singles ==
Title	Year	Peak chart positions	Album
Title	Year	JPN Down.	Album
"Blue Canvas"	2023	100	"Koi Sekai" (single)
"Kogarashi ni Dakarete" (木枯しに抱かれて)	2024	85	Autumn Tracks: Aki no Uta

== Music videos ==
Year	Song	Director
2010	"Irony"	
2011	"Connect"	Takumi Shiga
2011	"Nexus"	Kazuaki Nakamura
2012	"Naisho no Hanashi"	Kazuaki Nakamura
2012	"Wake Up"	Junya Morita
2012	"Luminous"	
2013	"Reunion"	Jungo
2013	"With You"	
2013	"Colorful"	Jungo
2014	"Click"	Jungo
2014	"Step"	Jungo
2015	"Border"	Naoyuki Fujise
2015	"Anemone"	
2015	"Prism"	
2016	"Gravity"	
2016	"Clever"	
2016	"Again"	
2017	"Hitorigoto"	
2017	"Shiori"	
2018	"Primalove"	
2018	"CheerS"	
2020	"Alethea"	

=== Other album appearances ===
Year	Song	Album	Notes	Ref.
2011	"Irony"	Ore no Imōto ga Konna ni Kawaii Wake ga Nai Original Soundtrack (俺の妹がこんなに可愛いわけがない オリジナルサウンドトラック)	TV-size version theme song to Ore no Imōto ga Konna ni Kawaii Wake ga Nai anime series.	
2011	"True Blue"	Zone Tribute: Kimi ga Kureta Mono (ZONEトリビュート～君がくれたもの～)	Tribute album for the band Zone. "True Blue" is a cover of Zone's 2003 single and the first opening theme of the 2003 Astro Boy anime series.	
2011	"Irony"	Ore no Imōto ga Konna ni Kawaii Wake ga Nai Complete Collection+ (俺の妹がこんなに可愛いわけがない Complete Collection+)	TV-size version theme song to Ore no Imōto ga Konna ni Kawaii Wake ga Nai anime series.	
2012	"Wake Up"	Moyashimon Returns Original Soundtrack (もやしもんリターンズ オリジナルサウンドトラック)	TV-size version theme song to Moyashimon Returns anime series.	
2013	"Connect"	Puella Magi Madoka Magica Music Collection (魔法少女まどか☆マギカ MUSIC COLLECTION)	A collection of music from the Puella Magi Madoka Magica anime series.	
