= List of Moyashimon chapters =

Thirteenth tankōbon volume cover of Moyasimon (limited edition), released by Kodansha on March 20, 2014

Moyasimon: Tales of Agriculture, known in Japan as Moyashimon (もやしもん), is a manga series written and illustrated by Masayuki Ishikawa. It was serialized in Kodansha's seinen manga magazine Evening from July 2004 to April 2013. It was moved to Kodansha's seinen magazine Monthly Morning Two on June that same year, and continued serialization until January 2014. Originally titled Nōdai Monogatari (農大物語; 'Tales of an Agricultural University'), its title was changed in the second chapter to Nōdai Monogatari Moyasimon (農大物語もやしもん; 'Moyasimon: Tales of an Agricultural University'), then simply Moyashimon in the third chapter, before gaining the English subtitle Tales of Agriculture from the eighth chapter onward. Kodansha published its chapters in 13 tankōbon volumes between May 23, 2005, and March 20, 2014. Del Rey Manga licensed the manga for North American distribution in September 2008, releasing two volumes in English between November 2009 and June 2010.

== Volume list ==
No.	Original release date	Original ISBN	English release date	English ISBN
1	May 23, 2005	978-4-06-352106-1	November 24, 2009	978-0-345-51472-1
001. "Enrollment" (入学, Nyūgaku); 002. "Ability" (能力, Nōryoku); 003. "Hiochi" (ヒオチ, Hiochi); 004. "Senpai" (先輩, Senpai); 005. "Night" (夜, Yoru); 006. "Second Day" (2日目, 2 nichime); 007. "Orientation" (オリエンテーション, Orientēshon); 008. "Sterilization" (除菌, Jokin); 009. "Time to Brew" (かもすぞ, Kamosuzo); 010. "Spring" (はる, Haru); 011. "Battle of the Benign Bacteria" (たたかう善玉菌, Tatakau zendama kin); "Omake" (おまけ, Omake)
2	October 21, 2005	978-4-06-352126-9	June 22, 2010	978-0-345-51473-8
012. "A New Power" (新たな能力者, Aratana nōryokusha); 013. "Do You Hate Nihonshu?" (日本酒はお嫌いですか?, Nihonshu wa okirai desu ka?); 014. "Miss Medium" (ミス媒体, Misu baitai); 015. "Smallest Enemy of Mankind" (人類最小の敵, Jinrui saishō no kataki); 016. "Are You Drinking Good Sake?" (おいしいお酒を飲んでいますか?, Oishi osake o nonde imasu ka?); 017. "See Things from Their Perspective" (相手の目線に立ってみよう, Aite no mesen ni tatte miyou); 018. "Spring Festival" (春祭り, Haru matsuri); 019. "Raid" (襲撃, Shūgeki); 020. "Fighting Men" (戦う男ども, Tatakau otoko domo); 021. "Let's End the Spring Festival" (春祭りを終わらせよう, Haru matsuri wo owarase you); 022. "After the Festival" (祭りあと, Matsuri ato); 023. "Mornings" (それぞれの朝, Sore zore no asa); "Omake" (おまけ, Omake)
3	July 27, 2006	978-4-06-352151-1; 978-4-06-372153-9 (SE)	—	—
024. Nattō kū kansaijin to tsukko mu kikokushijo (納豆食う関西人とツッコむ帰国子女); 025. "Underwear" (アンダーウエア, Andā uia); 026. "DRC"; 027. "Root of Evil" (禍根, Kakon); 028. Koko ni chi hate umi ga hajimeru (ここに地果て海が始める。); 029. Sukanjinabia no kaori (スカンジナビアの香り♪); 030. "One Day in Early Summer" (とある初夏の日, Toaru shoka no hi); 031. "Teamwork" (チームワーク, Chīmu wāku); 032. "Enough for Today" (おつかれさま。, Otsukare sama); 033. "Summer Vacation" (夏休み, Natsu yasumi); 034. Shurei no kuni no osake (守礼の国のお酒); 035. Chōki jukusei (長期熟成); 036. "Salvage" (サルベージ, Sarubēji); 037. "I wish you are Happy Tomorrow" (明日もあなたが幸せでありますように, Ashitamo anata ga shiawase de arimasu you ni); "Bonus Comic" (おまけ, Omake)
4	December 22, 2006	978-4-06-352171-9; 978-4-06-358234-5 (SE)	—	—
038. "Oryzae's Melancholy" (オリゼーの憂鬱, Orizē no yūutsu); 039. Takaku hishō shinai mono ha ookiku ochiru kotomo nai (高く飛翔しない者は大きく墜ちる事も無い); 040. "The Perfect Woman" (完璧な女, Kanpeki na onna); 041. "Shorty and Gothic Lolita" (チビとゴスロリ, Chibi to gosu rori); 042. Chibi to jokin onna (チビと除菌女); 043. "Midsummer Night's Miracle" (真夏の夜の不思議, Manatsu no yoru no fushigi); 044. "War of the Worlds" (宇宙戦争, Uchiyū sensō); 045. "Uncovered" (発覚, Hakkaku); 046. "Controversy" (物議, Butsugi); 047. "Purpose" (目的, Mokuteki); 048. "Autumn Comes" (初秋へ, Shoshū he); "Bonus Comic" (おまけ, Omake); Moyashimon Shucchō hen nose te moraou (「もやしもん」出張編 載せてもらおう)
5	June 22, 2007	978-4-06-352192-4; 978-4-06-362082-5 (SE)	—	—
049. "Autumn" (秋, Aki); 050. "The Changes in Autumn" (変化の秋, Henka no aki); 051. "Thank You Very Much for Visiting us Today" (本日は御利用頂き誠に有難う御座居ます, Honjitsu wa goriyō itadaki makoto ni arigatō gozaimasu); 052. "The Eve of the Harvest Festival" (収穫祭前夜, Shūkakusai zenya); 053. "Harvest Festival" (収穫祭, Shūkakusai); 054. "Open Gate" (開門, Kaimon); 055. "A Long Autumn Night" (秋の夜長, Aki no yonaga); 056. "Teamwork 2" (チームワーク2, Chīmu wāku 2); 057. "Kouyasai" (後夜祭, Kōyasai); 058. "France" (フランスへ, Furansu he); 059. "At Night in France" (フランスの夜, Furansu no yoru); 060. "Trois foie gras S'il vous plaît" (トロワ フォアグラ シルブ プレ, Torowa foagura shirubu pure); Moyashimon Shucchō hen zōkan komikku ran (「もやしもん」出張編 増刊コミック乱); "Bonus Comic" (オマーケ, Omake)
6	February 22, 2008	978-4-06-352213-6; 978-4-06-358243-7 (SE)	—	—
061. "Bourgogne Blanc" (ブルゴーニュ ブラン, Burigōnyu buran); 062. "Margin just aren't Enough" (欄外だけでは足りないの, Rangai dake de wa tarinai no); 063. "Mariage" (マリアージュ, Mariāju); 064. "Angry Women" (怒る女達, Ikaru onnatachi); 065. "A Couple's Birthday" (カップル誕生, Kappuru tanjō); 066. "Soy un mexicano."; 067. "Everyone's Thoughts (Germs included)" (それぞれの悩み、思惑(菌含む), Sore zore no nayami, omowaku (kin fukumu)); 068. "Grand Cru Trail" (グラン=クリュ街道にて, Guran = kuryu kaidōnita); 069. "Boy who see Germs" (菌が見える少年, Kin ga mieru shōnen); 070. Surechigau omoi (すれちがう思い); 071. "Travaillez par tous."; 072. "Now it's New Morning" (そして朝がはじまる, Soshite asaga wa jimaru); 073. "Back Home" (ただいま, Tadaima); Moyashimon Shucchō hen ō tī kūsō komikku ran (「もやしもん」出張編 OT空想コミック乱); "Bonus Comic" (おまけ, Omake)
7	December 22, 2008	978-4-06-352244-0; 978-4-06-362127-3 (SE)	—	—
075. "Germs, Law and Haduki Oikawa" (菌と法律と及川葉月, Kin to hōritsu to Oikawa Hazuki); 076. "Fermentation Cellar Activates" (発酵蔵始動, Hakkō kura shidō); 077. "Renewal" (リニューアルしました, Rinyūaru shimashita); 078. "Moyashis Stand Up" (もやしども立つ, Moyashi domo tatsu); 079. "Chance Meeting" (邂逅, Kaigō); 080. "Secret in Long Autumn's Night" (秋の夜長の秘め事, Aki no yonaga no himegoto); 081. "Oikawa is Angry" (及川怒る, Oikawa okoru); 082. "Oikawa pretends" (及川、よそおう, Oikawa, yosoou); 083. "Team Oikawa" (チーム及川, Chīmu Oikawa); 084. "Kaneshiro is Confused" (金城、困惑する, Kaneshiro, konwaku suru); 085. "Sawaki's Confession" (沢木告白する, Sawaki kokuhaku suru); 086. "Shared Secret" (共有される秘密, Kyōyuu sareru himitsu); "Bonus Comic" (おまけ, Omake)
8	July 23, 2009	978-4-06-352272-3; 978-4-06-362148-8 (SE)	—	—
087. "Let's talk about beer" (とりあえずビールのおはなし, Toriaezu bīru no ohanashi); 088. "Itsuki's Beer" (樹のビール, Itsuki no bīru); 089. "Mutō, Running Drunk or Wild" (酩酊あるいは暴走するムトー, Meitei aruiha bōsō suru mutō); 090. "What's Beer?" (ビールって何だろう?, Bīru tte nan darō?); 091. "Serve Yourself with Fine Beer" (おいしいビールをめしあがれ, Oishi bīru o meshiagare); 092. "What's Beer? Itsuki ver." (ビールとは? 樹Ver., Bīru to wa? Itsuki Ver.); 093. "Kanō farm" (かのうファーム, Kanō fāmu); "Sincerely, to Beer Brewers in this Country" (全国ビール蔵の皆様へ, Zenkoku bīru kura no minasama e); 094. "Muto Notices Things" (ムトー、色々気付く., Mutō, iroiro kizuku); 095. "Miss Nōdai" (ミス農大, Misu nōdai); 096. "Oktoberfest" (オクトーバーフェスト, Okutōbāfesuto); 097. "Sawaki's Secret" (沢木の秘密, Sawaki no Himitsu); 098. "Smile and Beer" (笑顔でビールを, Egao de bīru o); "Bonus Comic 1" (おまけ1, Omake 1); "Bonus Comic 2" (おまけ2, Omake 2)
9	July 6, 2010	978-4-06-352312-6; 978-4-06-362169-3 (SE)	—	—
Moyashimon ni misekake ta are no kai (もやしもんにみせかけたアレの回); 099. "How about some Tea?" (お茶でもいかが?, Ocha demo ikaga?); 100. "Ag-school Students and Agriculture" (農大生と農業, Nōdai sei to nōkyō); 101. "Food Self-Sufficiency Rate" (食料自給率, Shokuryō jikyuu ritsu); 102. "Thanks to the fast" (いただきます, Itadakimasu); 103. "Party comes to End" (酣ではございますが, Takenawa dewa gozaimasu ga); 104. "Pioneers" (先達, Sendatsu); 105. "Secret Time" (ナイショの時間, Naisho no jikan); 106. "Winter Comes" (冬の訪れ, Fuyu no otozure); 107. "Surprise and Joy of Knowledge" (知る喜びと驚き, Shiru yorokobi to odoroki); 108. "Sake-brewery Eve" (日本酒醸造前夜, Nihonshu shōzō zenya); 109. "Feel Winter" (冬の予感, Fuyu no yokan); 110. "Calling on Marie" (おむかえ, "Omukae"); "Bonus Comic" (おまけ, Omake)
10	March 25, 2011	978-4-06-352350-8; 978-4-06-376056-9 (SE)	—	—
111. Tadaima idō chu (只今移動中); 112. Sawaki, sagasu. (沢木、探す。); 113. Kei, hashiru (蛍、走る); 114. Tabi wa michizure (旅は道連れ); 115. 5 bangai 34 chōme no marī (5番街34丁目のマリー); 116. Amerika gasshūkoku (アメリカ合衆国); 117. Saikai e (再会へ); 118. Nihongomuzukashiidesu (ニホンゴムズカシイデス); 119. Nyūorinzu e (ニューオリンズへ); 120. Sawaki Souemon naotsugu (沢木惣右衛門直継); 121. Kizuna (絆); 122. Bābonsutorīto no yoru (バーボンストリートの夜); "Bonus Comic" (おまけ(1), Omake (1)); "Bonus Comic" (おまけ(2)笑い飯全一冊出張版, Omake (2) Warai meshi zen issatsu shutchō-ban); "Bonus Comic" (おまけ(3), Omake (3))
11	March 23, 2012	978-4-06-352408-6; 978-4-06-362212-6 (SE)	—	—
123. Fuyu no nōdai (冬の農大); 124. Misu nōdai shinmon (ミス農大審問); Bangai-hen: Fukuin kara saiyaku e (番外編 福音から災厄へ); 125. Jichi ryō kinkyū kaigi (自治寮緊急会議); 126. Hōki suru megami-tachi (蜂起する女神達); 127. Oikawa no riyū (及川の理由); 128. Nihonshu to gara sutokkingu (日本酒と柄ストッキング); 129. Go-banme no onna (五番目の女); 130. Misu nōdai otoshi (ミス農大落とし); 131. Hirooka Aya vs. Otokotachi (宏岡亜矢vs.男達); 132. Kangaeru otokotachi (考える男達); 133. Itoshino Kyasarin (愛しのキャサリン); 134. Joō kōrin (女王降臨); 135. Hoshi furu seiya ni (星降る聖夜に); Omake (おまけ)
12	April 5, 2013	978-4-06-352456-7; 978-4-06-362247-8 (SE)	—	—
136. Soshite sakezukuri wa tsuzuku (そして酒造りは続く); 137. Makikoma reru otoko no honryō (巻き込まれる男の本領); 138. Sawaki en aruiwa Nishino Nao Tadayasu (kari) (沢木円あるいは西野直保(仮)); 139. Nishino en, dokusō (西野円、独走); 140. Yome (kari) VS. Kanojo (otoko) (嫁(仮)VS.彼女(男)); 141. Nihonshu e no ai (日本酒への愛); 142. Itsuka sōiu hi ga kuru to wa omotte imashitaga yahari odoroku monodesu by A. orizē (いつかそういう日が来るとは思っていましたが やはりおどろくものですby A・オリゼー); 143. Otoko no ketsudan (男の決断); 144. Nishino en ni tsuite omoi ni fuke, kureru. (西野円について思いにふけ、暮れる。); 145. Oshōgatsu (お正月); 146. Minna mada kodomo (みんなまだ子供); 147. Nishino no riyū (西野の理由); 148. Miseinen no shuchō (未成年の主張); 149. Atarashī nakama (新しい仲間); Omake (おまけ); Senden to kokuchi no kai (宣伝と告知の回)
13	March 20, 2014	978-4-06-388306-0; 978-4-06-358705-0 (SE)	—	—
150. Fuyu no shin teian (冬の新提案); 151. Suketto shūketsu (助っ人集結); 152. Ikinari yamaba (いきなり山場); 153. Shiken zenya (試験前夜); 154. Shin misu nōdai (新ミス農大); 155. Hotaru no kokuhaku (蛍の告白); 156. Hasegawa haruka no kokuhaku (長谷川遥の告白); 157. Tōji to kōbo to jōzō arukōru (杜氏と酵母と醸造アルコール); 158. Yo sake wa jō (良酒和醸); 159. Soshite atarashī toshi ga hajimaru (そして新しい年がはじまる); Omake (おまけ)
