= Party Time (ClariS album) =

Studio album by ClariS
- Released: June 4, 2014
- Recorded: 2013–2014
- Genre: J-pop
- Length: 52:46
- Label: SME

ClariS chronology
Second Story (2013)	Party Time (2014)	ClariS: Single Best 1st (2015)

Singles from Party Time
- 1. "Colorful" Released: October 30, 2013; 2. "Click" Released: January 29, 2014; 3. "Step" Released: April 16, 2014

Party Time is the third studio album by the Japanese pop music duo ClariS, released on June 4, 2014, by SME Records. The album contains 12 music tracks, three of which were previously released on three of ClariS' singles. Three different editions of the album were released: a regular CD version and two limited editions. Party Time was the last time Clara and Alice performed as ClariS, with Alice leaving the duo. Party Time peaked at No. 2 on the Japanese Oricon weekly albums chart.

Three of the songs were used as theme songs for anime: "Click" and "Step" were used as the opening theme songs to the 2014 anime television series Nisekoi and "Colorful" was the opening theme to the film Puella Magi Madoka Magica: Rebellion.

== Release and reception ==
Party Time was released on June 4, 2014, in three editions: a regular CD version and two limited editions. One of the limited edition versions was bundled with two Nendoroid figures of ClariS. The other limited-edition version came with a DVD containing music videos of the songs "Click", "Step" and "Colorful", as well as non-credit opening videos for "Colorful", "Click" and "Reunion", and a collection of television commercials for each of ClariS' singles. For the week of June 2, 2014 on Oricon's weekly albums chart, Party Time was reported to have sold 43,146 copies in its first week of sales, peaking at No. 2, and charted for 12 weeks.

== Track listing ==
No.	Title	Lyrics	Music	Arrangement	Length
1.	"Drawing"	Toshikazu Kadono	Toshikazu Kadono	Toshikazu Kadono	4:28
2.	"Click"	Kz	Kz	Kz	4:29
3.	"Nemurihime" (眠り姫 Sleeping Beauty)	Ryōsuke Shigenaga	Ryōsuke Shigenaga	Ryōsuke Shigenaga	4:00
4.	"Time"	Koh	Koh	Koh	4:14
5.	"Restart"	Mayuko Maruyama	Mayuko Maruyama	Mayuko Maruyama	4:07
6.	"Koinomi" (コイノミ)	Yoshie Isogai	Takamitsu Ono	Takamitsu Ono, Chihiro Tamaki	3:17
7.	"Step"	Kz	Kz	Kz	4:15
8.	"Dry Flower" (ドライフラワー Dorai Furawā)	Ion Okumura	Makoto Sakuma	Atsushi Yuasa	4:56
9.	"Topaz" (トパーズ Topāzu)	Shō Watanabe	Shō Watanabe	Atsushi Yuasa	3:54
10.	"Kakurenbo" (かくれんぼ Hide and Seek)	Manabu Ida	Manabu Ida	Ryōsuke Shigenaga	5:06
11.	"Colorful" (カラフル Karafuru)	Shō Watanabe	Shō Watanabe	Atsushi Yuasa	4:30
12.	"Orange"	Mayuko Maruyama	Mayuko Maruyama	Mayuko Maruyama	5:14
Total length:					52:46

Bonus DVD
No.	Title	Length
1.	"Colorful (Music Video)" (カラフル Karafuru)
2.	"Click (Music Video)"
3.	"Step (Music Video)"
4.	"TV Anime Ore no Imōto ga Konna ni Kawaii Wake ga Nai. Non-credit Opening Eizō" (TVアニメ「俺の妹がこんなに可愛いわけがない。」ノンクレジットオープニング映像 TV Anime Ore no Imōto ga Konna ni Kawaii Wake ga Nai. Non-credit Opening Video)
5.	"Puella Magi Madoka Magica: Rebellion Non-credit Opening Eizō" (「劇場版 魔法少女まどか☆マギカ[新編]叛逆の物語」ノンクレジットオープニング映像 Puella Magi Madoka Magica: Rebellion Non-credit Opening Video)
6.	"TV Anime Nisekoi First-half Non-credit Opening Eizō" (TVアニメ「ニセコイ」前期ノンクレジットオープニング映像 TV Anime Nisekoi First-half Non-credit Opening Video)
7.	"Tie-up Anime Shutsuen no Seiyū mo Sanka Shita Kaku Single no TV CM-shū" (タイアップアニメ出演の声優も参加した各シングルのTV CM集 TV CM Collection of Each Single with the Voice Actors from the Tie-up Anime Also Participating)

== Personnel ==
ClariS

- Clara – vocals
- Alice – vocals

Additional musicians

- Hiroomi Shitara – guitar
- Atsushi Yuasa – bass guitar

Production

- Daisuke Katsurada – executive producer
- Chiemi Kominami – executive producer
- Shunsuke Muramatsu – executive producer
- Ken'ichi Nakata – executive producer
- Tadayuki Kominami – producer
- Dai Ishikawa – director
- Takashi Koiwa – mixer
- Yuji Chinone – mastering
- Shinobu Matsuoka – management
- Megumi Hirose – products coordination
- Tatsuo Murai – art direction, design
