= Oto Wakka =

Japanese Internet meme

[Collaboration] Oto Wakka (【合作】おとわっか), also known as Oto Wakka (おとわっか), is an Oto MAD video derived from Final Fantasy X. It was posted on YouTube and Niconico on May 7, 2022, and was deleted on June 6, about a month later. Before its deletion, the video earned more than 3.1 million views. The video's most popular section (a parody of Connect) comedically portrayed the game's characters as homosexual, which has been viewed by some as mocking LGBT. The word "Oto Wakka" was given the silver award of the "Gadget News Internet Buzzword Award in the first half of 2022" (ガジェット通信ネット流行語大賞2022上半期).

== Timeline ==
Oto Wakka was posted on Niconico by Rug Mat (ラグマット) on May 7, 2022, and it quickly amassed many views. As it became popular, "FINAL FANTASY X | X-2 HD Remaster" became one of Steam's most popular games in the "RPG" category. At the same time, there was a debate among viewers about the morality of mockingly portraying the characters as homosexual. On June 6, about a month after the video was posted, it was deleted from Niconico at the request of Square Enix. Before its deletion, it earned more than 3.1 million views. After the deletion, Rug Mat tweeted: "Thanks for watching the video! I'm sorry!" and declared that he had no plans to repost the video.

== Content ==
Oto Wakka is a derivative work of Final Fantasy X. It is a video of a genre called otoMAD, which combines a medley style music with jokes surrounding Wakka, a character from the game. In the part using "Connect" (the opening theme of Puella Magi Madoka Magica), Wakka is treated as a homosexual who repeatedly shouts obscene words and yearns for Tidus. (Note: Origin of the phrase that appears in this part is based on the sentence "Tidus's combo feels very good!" (ティーダのコンボ気持ちよすぎだろ！), previously used in a commercial for Final Fantasy X.) This part was spread as a meme on social media, and many derivative videos were made.

== Influence and reaction ==
Since more than ten years ago, there have been topics on the Internet that treat Wakka as a homosexual arose from his body and molding. Also, in Niconico, content that treats homosexuals as ridiculous or insulting, such as the topic of "A Midsummer Night's Wet Dream" (content modified from a video works for homosexuals), has acquired deep-rooted popularity. There were many criticisms of Oto Wakka (to be descended from this), but the direction of consumption as an entertainment was also large. There is an objection that this is bright humor and not discrimination, and a refutation that it is an era that cannot be evasion as humor. On the other hand, there were many opinions that it was appropriate to be deleted by copyright infringement, and there were also positive opinions about the deletion. Within the day it was deleted, Shigetaka Kurita (chief operating officer of Dwango, which operates Niconico) didn't use the name explicitly and tweeted, "It's become a legend, don't be sad. It was fun".

AUTOMATON (video game website) published the article on 25 May. On 7 June, they changed the author to the AUTOMATON editorial department and apologized for this article with strikethroughs throughout the article. The reason is that they received a series of criticisms that it should not be published uncritically because it contains expressions that insult homosexuality. They also say they will re-examine the handling of Internet culture and take measures to prevent recurrence.

== See also ==
- YouTube
- Niconico
- Final Fantasy X
- otoMAD
