= Second Story (ClariS album) =

Studio album by ClariS
- Released: June 26, 2013
- Recorded: 2012–2013
- Genre: J-pop
- Length: 53:02
- Label: SME

ClariS chronology
Birthday (2012)	Second Story (2013)	Party Time (2014)

Singles from Second Story
- 1. "Wake Up" Released: August 15, 2012; 2. "Luminous" Released: October 10, 2012; 3. "Reunion" Released: April 17, 2013

Second Story is the second studio album of the Japanese pop music duo ClariS, released on June 26, 2013 by SME Records. The album contains 12 music tracks, three of which were previously released on three of ClariS' singles. Three different editions of the album were released: a regular CD version and two CD+DVD limited editions. Second Story peaked at No. 6 on the Japanese Oricon weekly albums chart.

Four of the songs were used as theme songs for various media: "Wake Up" was used as the opening theme to the 2012 anime television series Moyashimon Returns; "With You" was the theme song to 2013 video game Exstetra; "Luminous" used as the opening theme to the first two Puella Magi Madoka Magica anime films; and "Reunion" was the opening theme to the second season of the anime series Oreimo in 2013.

== Release and reception ==
Second Story was released on June 26, 2013, in three editions: a regular CD version and two CD+DVD limited editions. The DVD from both limited editions contained music videos of the songs "Wake Up", "With You", "Luminous" and "Reunion", as well as a collection of television commercials featuring advertising "Wake Up", "Luminous", "Reunion" and Second Story. One of the limited edition versions also came bundled with Graphig paper figures of ClariS, while the other limited-edition version came with a special album sleeve featuring art of ClariS drawn by Hideyuki Morioka of Shaft. For the week of June 24, 2013 on Oricon's weekly albums chart, Second Story was reported to have sold 38,940 copies in its first week of sales, peaking at No. 6, and charted for 13 weeks.

== Track listing ==
No.	Title	Lyrics	Music	Arrangement	Length
1.	"Second Story"	ClariS	Nori	Atsushi Yuasa	4:10
2.	"Halla" (ハルラ Harura)	Toshikazu Kadono	Toshikazu Kadono	Toshikazu Kadono	4:37
3.	"Wake Up"	Mayuko Maruyama	Mayuko Maruyama	Mayuko Maruyama	4:13
4.	"Rainy Day"	Koh	Koh	Koh	4:37
5.	"Hanabi"	Mayuko Maruyama	Mayuko Maruyama	Mayuko Maruyama	4:27
6.	"With You"	Mayuko Maruyama	Mayuko Maruyama	Mayuko Maruyama	3:55
7.	"Luminous" (ルミナス Ruminasu)	Shō Watanabe	Shō Watanabe	Atsushi Yuasa	4:12
8.	"Diary" (ダイアリー Daiarī)	Koh	Koh	Koh	3:44
9.	"Eternally"	Mayuko Maruyama	Mayuko Maruyama	Mayuko Maruyama	4:32
10.	"Hitotsu Dake" (ひとつだけ Just One)	Ryōsuke Shigenaga	Ryōsuke Shigenaga	Ryōsuke Shigenaga	5:49
11.	"Grasp" (グラスプ Gurasupu)	Shō Watanabe	Shō Watanabe	Atsushi Yuasa	3:58
12.	"Reunion"	Kz	Kz	Kz	4:51
Total length:					53:02

Bonus DVD
No.	Title	Length
1.	"Wake Up (Music Video)"
2.	"Luminous (Music Video)" (ルミナス Ruminasu)
3.	"Reunion (Music Video)"
4.	"With You (Music Video)"
5.	"Wake Up (TV CM)"
6.	"Luminous (TV CM)" (ルミナス Ruminasu)
7.	"Reunion (TV CM-shū)" (reunion (TV CM集) Reunion (TV CM Collection))
8.	"Second Story (TV CM-shū)" (SECOND STORY (TV CM集) Second Story (TV CM Collection))

== Personnel ==
ClariS

- Clara – vocals
- Alice – vocals

Additional musicians

- Hiroomi Shitara – guitar
- Atsushi Yuasa – bass

Production

- Daisuke Katsurada – executive producer
- Chiemi Kominami – executive producer
- Shunsuke Muramatsu – executive producer
- Ken'ichi Nakata – executive producer
- Tadayuki Kominami – producer
- Dai Ishikawa – director
- Takashi Koiwa – mixer
- Yuji Chinone – mastering
- Shinobu Matsuoka – management
- Kaori Kimura – products coordination
- Tatsuo Murai – art direction, design
