= Click (ClariS song) =

Single by ClariS

from the album Party Time
- Released: January 29, 2014
- Recorded: 2014
- Genre: J-pop
- Length: 4:32
- Label: SME Records
- Songwriter: Kz

ClariS singles chronology
"Colorful" (2013)	"Click" (2014)	"Step" (2014)

Audio sample
- file; help

"Click" is a pop song by the Japanese duo and idol unit ClariS, written by Kz. It was released as the unit's ninth single on January 29, 2014, by SME Records. The song was used as the first opening theme to the 2014 anime series Nisekoi. A music video was produced for "Click", directed by Jungo. The single peaked at No. 7 on Japan's weekly Oricon singles chart.

== Composition ==
"Click" is a synthpop song with instrumentation from a synthesizer. It is set in common time and moves at a tempo of 135 beats per minute in the B-flat major key throughout the song. The introduction starts with the synthesized music accompanying ClariS' vocals, and uses a bridge to transition into the first verse, followed by the chorus. After another bridge, this pattern is repeated for the second verse and chorus featuring the same music with different lyrics. A break is used to transition into the third verse, immediately followed by a short fourth verse. The chorus is used as the outro, and an instrumental coda is used to close the song.

== Release and reception ==
"Click" was released in a regular edition and two limited editions on January 29, 2014, as a CD by SME Records in Japan. One of the limited edition versions was packaged with Nisekoi artwork and also contained a short version of "Click" instead of its instrumental version. The other limited-edition version came bundled with a DVD containing the music video for "Click". The song peaked at No. 7 on Japan's weekly Oricon singles chart and charted for 16 weeks. "Click" debuted and peaked on the Billboard Japan Hot 100 at No. 11.

== Track listing ==
No.	Title	Lyrics	Music	Arrangement	Length
1.	"Click"	Kz	Kz	Kz	4:32
2.	"Shirushi" (シルシ Symbol)	Toshikazu Kadono	Toshikazu Kadono	Toshikazu Kadono	3:53
3.	"Next To You"	Manabu Ida	Manabu Ida	Atsushi Yuasa	4:50
4.	"Click (Instrumental)"		Kz	Kz	4:32
Total length:					17:48

Nisekoi limited edition
No.	Title	Lyrics	Music	Arrangement	Length
1.	"Click"	Kz	Kz	Kz	4:32
2.	"Shirushi" (シルシ Symbol)	Toshikazu Kadono	Toshikazu Kadono	Toshikazu Kadono	3:53
3.	"Next To You"	Manabu Ida	Manabu Ida	Atsushi Yuasa	4:50
4.	"Click (TV Mix)"	Kz	Kz	Kz	1:30
Total length:					14:47

DVD
No.	Title	Length
1.	"Click" (Music Video)	4:32

== Personnel ==
ClariS

- Clara – vocals
- Alice – vocals

Production

- Takashi Koiwa – mixer
- Yuji Chinone – mastering
- Tatsuo Murai – art direction, design

== Charts ==
Chart (2014)	Peak position
Japan Billboard Japan Hot 100	11
Japan Oricon Weekly Singles	7
