= Birthday (ClariS album) =

Studio album by ClariS
- Released: April 11, 2012
- Recorded: 2010–2012
- Genre: J-pop
- Length: 57:52
- Label: SME

ClariS chronology
Birthday (2012)	Second Story (2013)

Singles from Birthday
- 1. "Irony" Released: October 20, 2010; 2. "Connect" Released: February 2, 2011; 3. "Nexus" Released: September 14, 2011; 4. "Naisho no Hanashi" Released: February 1, 2012

Birthday is the debut studio album of the Japanese pop music duo ClariS, released on April 11, 2012 by SME Records. The album contains 12 music tracks, four of which were previously released on four of ClariS' singles. Three different editions of the album were released: a regular CD version, a two-CD limited edition and a CD+DVD limited edition. Birthday peaked at No. 2 on the Japanese Oricon weekly albums chart and was awarded a Gold Disc by the Recording Industry Association of Japan in May 2012.

Five of the songs were used as theme songs for various media: "Irony" was used as the opening theme to the 2010 anime television series Oreimo; "Koi Jishaku" was the first ending theme to the 2012 variety show Koekita!!; "Nexus" was the opening theme of the Ore no Imōto ga Konna ni Kawaii Wake ga Nai Portable ga Tsuzuku Wake ga Nai video game, as well as the theme for the ninth volume of the Oreimo light novels; "Connect" was used as the opening theme to the 2011 anime television series Puella Magi Madoka Magica; and "Naisho no Hanashi" was the ending theme to the 2012 anime television series Nisemonogatari.

== Release and reception ==
Birthday was released on April 11, 2012 in three editions: a regular CD version, a two-CD limited edition and a CD+DVD limited edition. The second CD bundled with the first limited-edition version contained a short version of their song "Anata ni Fit" from their third single "Nexus" and the theme song to the Nendoroid brand of plastic figures, "Nen-Do-Roido"; this version also included two Nendoroid figures of ClariS. The DVD bundled with the second limited-edition version contained non-credit opening and ending videos for "Irony", "Connect" and "Naisho no Hanashi" and a collection of television commercials featuring those songs. For the week of April 9, 2012 on Oricon's weekly albums chart, Birthday was reported to have sold 53,909 copies in its first week of sales, peaking at No. 2, and charted for 28 weeks. In May 2012, Birthday was awarded a Gold Disc by the Recording Industry Association of Japan for having exceeded 100,000 copies shipped in a single year.

== Track listing ==
No.	Title	Lyrics	Music	Arrangement	Length
1.	"Sayonara wa Iwanai" (サヨナラは言わない I Won't Say Goodbye)	Toshikazu Kadono	Toshikazu Kadono	Toshikazu Kadono	4:54
2.	"Irony"	Kz	Kz	Kz	4:18
3.	"Koi Jishaku" (恋磁石 Love Magnet)	Kazunori Watanabe	Kazunori Watanabe	Kazunori Watanabe	4:52
4.	"Memory" (メモリー Memorī)	Mayuko Maruyama	Mayuko Maruyama	Mayuko Maruyama	4:29
5.	"Nexus"	Kz	Kz	Kz	4:51
6.	"Flowery"	Kz	Kz	Kz	5:25
7.	"Connect" (コネクト Konekuto)	Shō Watanabe	Shō Watanabe	Atsushi Yuasa	4:30
8.	"Promise" (プロミス Puromisu)	Shō Watanabe	Shō Watanabe	Atsushi Yuasa	4:57
9.	"Graduation"	Mayuko Maruyama	Mayuko Maruyama	Mayuko Maruyama, Atsushi Yuasa	5:46
10.	"Treasure"	Ryōsuke Shigenaga	Ryōsuke Shigenaga	Ryōsuke Shigenaga	4:20
11.	"Naisho no Hanashi" (ナイショの話 Secret Conversation)	Ryo	Ryo	Ryo, Takuya	4:21
12.	"Zutto"	ClariS	Mayuko Maruyama	Mayuko Maruyama	4:59
Total length:					57:52

Bonus CD
No.	Title	Lyrics	Music	Arrangement	Length
1.	"Anata ni Fit (Puchi ver.)" (アナタニFIT -ぷち ver.-)	Hiroo Ōyagi	Hiroo Ōyagi	Hiroo Ōyagi	1:38
2.	"Nen-Do-Roido"	Tsukasa	Tsukasa	Tsukasa	1:58
Total length:					3:36

Bonus DVD
No.	Title	Length
1.	"TV Anime Ore no Imōto ga Konna ni Kawaii Wake ga Nai Non-credit OP Eizō" (TVアニメ「俺の妹がこんなに可愛いわけがない」ノンクレジットOP映像 TV Anime Ore no Imōto ga Konna ni Kawaii Wake ga Nai Non-credit OP Video)
2.	"TV Anime Puella Magi Madoka Magica Non-credit OP Eizō" (TVアニメ「魔法少女まどか☆マギカ」ノンクレジットOP映像 TV Anime Puella Magi Madoka Magica Non-credit OP Video)
3.	"TV Anime Nisemonogatari Non-credit ED Eizō" (TVアニメ「偽物語」ノンクレジットED映像 TV Anime Nisemonogatari Non-credit ED Video)
4.	"Irony TV CM-shū" (irony TV CM集 Irony TV CM Collection)
5.	"Connect TV CM-shū" (コネクト TV CM集 Connect TV CM Collection)
6.	"Naisho no Hanashi TV CM-shū" (ナイショの話 TV CM集 Naisho no Hanashi TV CM Collection)

== Personnel ==
ClariS

- Clara – vocals
- Alice – vocals

Additional musicians

- Takuya – chorus
- Hiroomi Shitara – guitar
- Takuya – guitar
- Manabu Nimura – bass
- Atsushi Yuasa – bass
- Takashi Kashikura – drums, tambourine
- Atsuhiro Murakami – drum tech
- Ryo – organ

Production

- Daisuke Katsurada – executive producer
- Chiemi Kominami – executive producer
- Shunsuke Muramatsu – executive producer
- Ken'ichi Nakata – executive producer
- Tadayuki Kominami – producer
- Dai Ishikawa – director
- Takashi Koiwa – mixer
- Shunroku Hitani – mixer
- Kazuhiro Yamada – mixer
- Yuji Chinone – mastering
- Shinobu Matsuoka – management
- Kaori Kimura – products coordination
- Motohiro Yamazaki – art direction, design
