= Maria the Virgin Witch =

Japanese manga series

- First tankōbon volume cover, featuring Maria

純潔のマリア (Junketsu no Maria)
- Genre: Comedy; Historical fantasy
- Manga
- Written by: Masayuki Ishikawa
- Published by: Kodansha
- English publisher: NA: Kodansha USA
- Magazine: Good! Afternoon
- Original run: November 7, 2008 – July 5, 2013
- Volumes: 3
- Manga

Maria the Virgin Witch Exhibition
- Written by: Masayuki Ishikawa
- Published by: Kodansha
- English publisher: NA: Kodansha USA
- Magazine: Good! Afternoon
- Original run: July 7, 2014 – January 7, 2015
- Volumes: 1
- Anime television series
- Directed by: Gorō Taniguchi
- Produced by: Jun'ichirō Tsuchiya; Kazuyoshi NIshikawa; Norie Shimizu; Takayuki Tabata; Taro Tanaka; Yōhei Kisara
- Written by: Hideyuki Kurata
- Music by: Masato Koda
- Studio: Production I.G
- Licensed by: AUS: Madman Entertainment; NA: Funimation
- Original network: Tokyo MX, Sun TV, KBS, TV Aichi, AT-X, BS11
- Original run: January 11, 2015 – March 29, 2015
- Episodes: 12
- icon

Maria the Virgin Witch (Japanese: 純潔のマリア, Hepburn: Junketsu no Maria; lit. 'Maria the Virgin'), subtitled Sorcière de gré, pucelle de force ("Witch by choice[free will], maiden by force"), is a Japanese manga series written and illustrated by Masayuki Ishikawa. Kodansha USA licensed the manga and released the series and its spin-off Exhibition from February 24 to August 25, 2015. An anime adaptation aired from January to March 2015.

== Plot ==
Set in France during the Hundred Years' War, it follows Maria, who is one of the most powerful witches of her era. She intervenes against the warring nations by using her succubus and incubus familiars to manipulate the opposing factions, as well as large-scale illusions, all for the sake of helping the people and maintaining peace. As a result, she has gained the appreciation of several villagers and the hostility of the Church, which considers her a heretic. Yet Maria is still a virgin and her own familiars tease her about it. As news of her actions spreads, Archangel Michael focuses on Maria and rejects her interference in human affairs. After a direct confrontation, Michael ultimately decides that Maria will lose her magical powers if she loses her virginity and also forbids her from publicly using magic, sending an angel called Ezekiel to oversee this decree.

== Characters ==
Maria (マリア, Maria)
Voiced by: Hisako Kanemoto (Japanese); Alexis Tipton (English)
A very powerful witch that hates conflicts, and because of her interference in the battles, she's forced by Heaven to stop using magic in front of common people, and the moment she loses her virginity, she will lose her powers. Later, she falls in love with Joseph. It has been hinted that she may be much older than she seems.
Artemis (アルテミス, Arutemisu)
Voiced by: Yōko Hikasa (Japanese); Whitney Rodgers (English)
Maria's succubus familiar, who enjoys teasing Maria for her virginity and lack of experience. Despite that she's very protective of her mistress.
Priapus (プリアポス, Puriaposu)
Voiced by: Mikako Komatsu (Japanese); Jerry Jewell (English)
Maria's incubus familiar who, unfortunately, lacks a penis since Maria doesn't know male anatomy very well. The same as Artemis, he is protective of Maria.
Ezekiel (エゼキエル, Ezekieru)
Voiced by: Kana Hanazawa (Japanese); Leah Clark (English)
An angel sent by Heaven to ensure that Maria doesn't use magic in public, although Maria and her familiars always find loopholes to do so. She takes the form of a white dove and is nicknamed Popo by Anne and Marias familiars. She eventually comes to sympathize with Maria and prevents herself from killing her when Michael gives her the order. For this insubordination she's sentenced by the archangel to become fallen, but is promised to be reincarnated as a human. Michael commands her to choose the one who will be bearing her and, without hesitating, Ezekiel chooses Maria to become her mother.
Joseph (ジョセフ, Josefu)
Voiced by: Kenshō Ono (Japanese); Austin Tindle (English)
A young man serving under Guillaume, who gets Maria's protection and becomes infatuated with the young witch and her dreams. He's also a virgin and tries to support Maria in any way he knows.
Anne (アン, An)
Voiced by: Ai Kakuma (Japanese); Lara Woodhull (English)
A girl that takes a liking towards Maria. A surprising fact is that the female narrator is Anne as a grandmother.
Bonne (ボンネ, Bonne)
Voiced by: Yuka Keichō (Japanese); Cynthia Cranz (English)
The mother of Anne and daughter of Martha.
Martha (マーサ, Māsa)
Voiced by: Miyuki Ichijo (Japanese); Linda Leonard (English)
Anne's grandmother and a good friend of Maria.
Guillaume (ギヨーム, Giyōmu)
Voiced by: Bin Shimada (Japanese); Barry Yandell (English)
Bernard's uncle and Joseph's master, who follows his nephew's plan into using Maria for their own goals.
Viv (ビブ, Bibu)
Voiced by: Mamiko Noto (Japanese); Colleen Clinkenbeard (English)
A witch from England who fights for whoever pays her. She takes an interest in Maria and tries to convince her of losing her virginity. Later she becomes friends with Maria.
Michael (ミカエル, Mikaeru)
Voiced by: Kikuko Inoue (Japanese); Caitlin Glass (English)
The Head angel of Heaven who, after seeing Anne and Joseph's love for Maria, decides to give her another chance and assigns Ezekiel to watch her.
Edwina (エドウィナ, Edowina)
Voiced by: Yumi Uchiyama (Japanese); Trina Nishimura (English)
A shy witch who gives Maria the ingredients to make her medicines. She uses her cat familiar as messenger and to communicate with the other witches. She keeps to herself and hides away in a rundown stone building. She finally leaves her home to help Maria from burning at the stake.
Garfa (ガルファ, Garufa)
Voiced by: Yūki Ono (Japanese); Chris Rager (English)
A mercenary of the French army who gets upset when Maria interferes with battles, since it means he doesn't get paid. He's assigned by Bernard and Guillaume into killing Maria if she keeps interfering. After killing Yvain, he loses his left arm by a straight cannonball during battle. He survives and fully gives his support to Bernard, receiving a metal arm and becomes the leader of the mercenary group.
Lolotte (ロロット, Rorotto)
Voiced by: Sachiko Kojima (Japanese); Alex Moore (English)
A prostitute who works alongside the mercenary company Garfa belongs to. She's the only one who knows Garfa killed Yvain.
Yvain (イーヴァン, Īvan)
Voiced by: Kenta Miyake (Japanese); Jeremy Inman (English)
The leader of the mercenary force Garfa belongs to. He's murdered by Garfa during a battle when he threatens to take away all his earnings and insults his Moorish descent.
Bernard (ベルナール, Berunāru)
Voiced by: Takahiro Sakurai (Japanese); Sonny Strait (English)
A cunning and ruthless monk from the Roman Catholic Church, who starts manipulating Maria's actions into benefiting him and the French army. He later has a divine revelation when he questions Maria's interventions in jail. He dies when trying to choke Michael in the last episode.
Gilbert (ジルベール, Jirubēru)
Voiced by: Natsuki Hanae (Japanese); Joel McDonald (English)
A novice Monk from the Roman Catholic Church who works under Bernard.
Cernunnos (ケルヌンノス, Kerununnosu)
Voiced by: Takaya Hashi (Japanese); Kent Williams (English)
The old God of Celtic mythology, whose influence has dwindled with the expansion of Christianity and tries to convince Maria in joining him.

== Anime ==
An anime adaptation aired on January 11, 2015, and ended on March 29, 2015. "Philosophy of Dear World" by ZAQ is the opening song of the anime while "ailes" by TRUE is the ending song.

=== Episode list ===
No.	Title	Original release date
1	"Perfect Virgin" "Virgo Intacta: Kanzen'naru otome" (VIRGO INTACTA: 完全なる乙女)	January 11, 2015
Maria is a witch living in France during the events of the Hundred Years' War. Loathing war and strife, she usually interferes in the battles between the French and English, drawing the attention of the heavens.
2	"Against the World" "Contra Mundum: Sekai ni taisu" (CONTRA MUNDUM: 世界に対す)	January 18, 2015
The Archangel Michael descends from heaven to reprimand Maria's meddling with the humans' affairs, but she refuses to comply and just when she is about to be killed, her friends Joseph and Anna intervene at her favor.
3	"By Faith, Not Arms" "Fide, Non Armis: Bukidenaku shinkō de" (FIDE, NON ARMIS: 武器でなく信仰で)	January 25, 2015
Despite being spared, Maria was sentenced by the heavens to lose her powers should she loses her virginity, and Michael sends the angel Ezekiel to watch over her. Meanwhile, Maria's feats draw her some unwanted attention from the church.
4	"Remember to Die" "Memento Mori: Shi o omoe" (MEMENTO MORI: 死を思え)	February 1, 2015
Having no success in stopping Maria from interfering on the war, Ezekiel learns more about her past from her familiars, the succubus Artemis and the incubus Priapus.
5	"Courage, Prudence" "Sapere Aude: Yūki o, funbetsu o" (SAPERE AUDE: 勇気を, 分別を)	February 8, 2015
When Joseph's friend, the mercenary Garfa is caught in an affair with a knight's lover, he must fight for his life and honor in a duel, a conflict Maria decides to sit out.
6	"Under the Rose" "Sub Rosa: Bara no shita de" (SUB ROSA: 薔薇の下で)	February 15, 2015
Joseph is tasked to convince Maria to stay out of an important battle that may bring an end to the war, but when she finds that he and Anna's father are involved, she decides to intervene nonetheless, with tragic consequences.
7	"The War Will Feed Itself" "Bellum Se Ipsum Alet: Sensō wa sensō o kuu" (BELLUM SE IPSUM ALET: 戦争は戦争を食う)	February 22, 2015
Despite ordered by Michael to kill Maria should she uses her magic in front of the people again, Ezekiel barely avoids to fatally wound her instead. Meanwhile, Garfa, who lost an arm during the battle, blames Maria for it and swears revenge on her, assisted by the church who views her as a hindrance.
8	"Man Is a Wolf to Man" "Lupus Est Homo Homini: Hito wa, hito ni totte ōkami" (LUPUS EST HOMO HOMINI: 人は, 人にとって狼)	March 1, 2015
Despite not fully healed, Maria returns home just to find that she is being blamed for the French defeat in the last battle and the sudden worsening of Martha's condition. Meanwhile, Brother Bernard conspires to bring her down.
9	"With a Grain of Salt" "Cum Grano Salis: Hito-tsumami no shio o" (CUM GRANO SALIS: 一つまみの塩を)	March 8, 2015
Thanks to Bernard's machinations, Maria is captured and imprisoned by the church. Realizing that she still has not lost her virginity, and her powers as well, her friends join forces to rescue her, as the English prepare another attack.
10	"I Hate and I Love" "Odi Et Amo: Ware nikumi, Ware aisu" (ODI ET AMO: 我憎み, 我愛す)	March 15, 2015
Viv fights Michael and gets injured by Ezekiel. While recuperating at Edwina's, Viv convinces her to come out of hiding and save Maria. Meanwhile, Joseph and Garfa go off to war and confront each other in a church.
11	"If You Wish to be Loved, Love" "Si Vis Amari, Ama: Ai o Nozomu nara Aise" (SI VIS AMARI, AMA: 愛を望むなら愛せ)	March 22, 2015
While Joseph and Garfa fight, Maria has Edwina take her to the town England is occupying to save Joseph. When the fight ends with Garfa's fall, Maria and Joseph argue over each others personal flaws and in the end realize their true feelings for each other. Joseph proposes marriage, and Maria, over come with joy, and regains her magic. After using it to end the battle they are summoned by Michael.
12	"Love Conquers All" "Omnia Vincit Amor: Ai wa subete ni katsu" (OMNIA VINCIT AMOR: 愛は全てに勝つ)	March 29, 2015
As Michael prepares to execute Maria, she is saved by Viv, Edwina, and the other witches. Spurred by their desire to protect Maria, Michael uses his powers to ask persons who have met Maria for their opinions. After passing judgement and sparing Maria, Michael prepared to judge Ezekiel for siding with Maria. It is decided that she will be reborn as a human with Maria as her mother. Joseph leaves the service of his lord, and takes Maria (presumably pregnant with Ezekiel) as his wife, who says her goodbyes to Cernunnos as they live together in Ann's village.

== Reception ==
By February 14, 2010, volume 1 of the manga had sold 81,643 copies. By October 16, 2011, volume 2 had sold 94,578 copies. As of October 13, 2013, volume 3 has sold 57,516 copies.
