= Luminous (ClariS song) =

Single by ClariS

from the album Second Story
- Released: October 10, 2012
- Recorded: 2012
- Genre: J-pop
- Length: 4:08
- Label: SME
- Songwriter: Shō Watanabe

ClariS singles chronology
"Wake Up" (2012)	"Luminous" (2012)	"Reunion" (2013)

Audio sample
- A 23-second sample from "Luminous", featuring ClariS singing the end the first verse and chorus.: file; help

"Luminous" (ルミナス, Ruminasu) is a pop song by the Japanese duo and idol unit ClariS, written by Shō Watanabe. It was released as the unit's sixth single on October 10, 2012, by SME Records. The song was used as the opening theme to the anime films Puella Magi Madoka Magica: Beginnings and Eternal (2012). A music video was produced for "Luminous". The single peaked at No. 4 on Japan's weekly Oricon singles chart, and was later awarded a Gold Disc by the Recording Industry Association of Japan for having exceeded 100,000 copies shipped in a single year.

== Composition ==
"Luminous" is a J-pop song with instrumentation from piano, violin and drums. It is set in common time and moves at a tempo of 173 beats per minute. Beginning in the G major key, the introduction starts with only piano and adds drums and violin to transition into the first verse in C-sharp minor, followed by the chorus. After a bridge in G major, the key shifts back to C-sharp minor for the second verse and chorus, which use the same music with different lyrics. The key shifts from C-sharp minor to G major with a short break used to transition into the third verse, immediately followed by the chorus in C-sharp minor as the outro. A short coda is used to close the song.

== Release and reception ==
"Luminous" was released in a regular edition and two limited editions on October 10, 2012, as a CD by SME Records in Japan. One of the limited edition versions was packaged with Puella Magi Madoka Magica artwork and instead of containing an instrumental version of "Luminous" as in the other two editions, it has a short version of the song in addition to a short orchestral version of "Connect". The other limited-edition version came bundled with a DVD containing the music video for "Luminous". The song peaked at No. 4 on Japan's weekly Oricon singles chart, selling over 39,000 copies in its first week of sales, and charted for 18 weeks. In December 2014, "Luminous" was certified gold by the Recording Industry Association of Japan (RIAJ) for having exceeded 100,000 copies shipped in a single year. "Luminous" debuted and peaked on the Billboard Japan Hot 100 at No. 5.

== Music video ==
The music video is entirely animated. It features throughout the video semi-animated illustrations of ClariS by Hideyuki Morioka blended with scenes from the first Puella Magi Madoka Magica anime film, Puella Magi Madoka Magica: Beginnings.

== Track listing ==
No.	Title	Lyrics	Music	Arrangement	Length
1.	"Luminous" (ルミナス Ruminasu)	Shō Watanabe	Shō Watanabe	Atsushi Yuasa	4:08
2.	"Friends"	Toshikazu Kadono	Toshikazu Kadono	Toshikazu Kadono	3:49
3.	"Blossom"	Ryōsuke Shigenaga	Ryōsuke Shigenaga	Ryōsuke Shigenaga	4:04
4.	"Luminous (Instrumental)" (ルミナス Ruminasu)		Shō Watanabe	Atsushi Yuasa	4:08
Total length:					16:22

Madoka Magica limited edition
No.	Title	Lyrics	Music	Arrangement	Length
1.	"Luminous" (ルミナス Ruminasu)	Shō Watanabe	Shō Watanabe	Atsushi Yuasa	4:08
2.	"Friends"	Toshikazu Kadono	Toshikazu Kadono	Toshikazu Kadono	3:49
3.	"Blossom"	Ryōsuke Shigenaga	Ryōsuke Shigenaga	Ryōsuke Shigenaga	4:04
4.	"Luminous (Movie Mix)" (ルミナス Ruminasu)	Shō Watanabe	Shō Watanabe	Atsushi Yuasa	1:42
5.	"Connect (Orchestra ver.) (Short Edit)" (コネクト Konekuto)	Shō Watanabe	Shō Watanabe	Atsushi Yuasa	1:37
Total length:					15:35

DVD
No.	Title	Length
1.	"Luminous" (Music Video)	4:08

== Personnel ==
ClariS

- Clara – vocals
- Alice – vocals

Production

- Takashi Koiwa – mixer
- Kōtarō Kojima – mastering
- Tatsuo Murai – art direction, design

== Charts ==
Chart (2012)	Peak position
Japan Billboard Japan Hot 100	5
Japan Oricon Weekly Singles	4
