= Colorful (ClariS song) =

Single by ClariS

from the album Party Time
- Released: October 30, 2013
- Recorded: 2013
- Genre: J-pop
- Length: 4:33
- Label: SME
- Songwriter: Shō Watanabe

ClariS singles chronology
"Reunion" (2013)	"Colorful" (2013)	"Click" (2014)

"Colorful" (カラフル, Karafuru) is a pop song by the Japanese duo and idol unit ClariS, written by Shō Watanabe. It was released as the unit's eighth single on October 30, 2013, by SME Records. The song was used as the opening theme to the film Puella Magi Madoka Magica: Rebellion (2013). A music video was produced for "Colorful", directed by Jungo. The single peaked at No. 3 on Japan's weekly Oricon singles chart.

== Composition ==
"Colorful" is a J-pop song with instrumentation from piano, violin, electric guitar, bass guitar, and drums. It is set in common time and moves at a tempo of 178 beats per minute. Beginning in the G-flat major key, the introduction starts with a music box and adds piano, drums and violin to transition into the first verse, followed by the chorus in A-flat major. After a short bridge, the key shifts back to G-flat major for the second verse and is again followed by the chorus in A-flat major, which use the same music with different lyrics. This is immediately followed by the third verse, interposed with a short break in F major followed by G-flat major, before finishing the third verse still in G-flat major. This is immediately followed by the chorus in A-flat major as the outro. A coda is used to close the song.

== Release and reception ==
"Colorful" was released in a regular edition and two limited editions on October 30, 2013, as a CD by SME Records in Japan. One of the limited edition versions was packaged with Puella Magi Madoka Magica artwork and instead of containing an instrumental version of "Colorful" as in the other two editions, it has a short version of the song. The other limited-edition version came bundled with a DVD containing the music video for "Colorful". The song peaked at No. 3 on Japan's weekly Oricon singles chart, and charted for 19 weeks. "Colorful" debuted and peaked on the Billboard Japan Hot 100 at No. 2.

== Track listing ==
No.	Title	Lyrics	Music	Arrangement	Length
1.	"Colorful" (カラフル Karafuru)	Shō Watanabe	Shō Watanabe	Atsushi Yuasa	4:33
2.	"Surely"	Manabu Ida	Manabu Ida	Manabu Ida	4:21
3.	"Pieces"	Mayuko Maruyama	Mayuko Maruyama	Mayuko Maruyama	4:18
4.	"Colorful (Instrumental)" (カラフル Karafuru)		Shō Watanabe	Atsushi Yuasa	4:33
Total length:					17:45

Madoka Magica limited edition
No.	Title	Lyrics	Music	Arrangement	Length
1.	"Colorful" (カラフル Karafuru)	Shō Watanabe	Shō Watanabe	Atsushi Yuasa	4:33
2.	"Surely"	Manabu Ida	Manabu Ida	Manabu Ida	4:21
3.	"Pieces"	Mayuko Maruyama	Mayuko Maruyama	Mayuko Maruyama	4:18
4.	"Colorful (Movie Mix)" (カラフル Karafuru)	Shō Watanabe	Shō Watanabe	Atsushi Yuasa	1:35
Total length:					14:47

DVD
No.	Title	Length
1.	"Colorful" (Music Video)	4:33

== Personnel ==
ClariS

- Clara – vocals
- Alice – vocals

Production

- Takashi Koiwa – mixer
- Kōtarō Kojima – mastering
- Tatsuo Murai – art direction, design

== Charts ==
Chart (2013)	Peak position
Japan Billboard Japan Hot 100	2
Japan Oricon Weekly Singles	3
