= Naisho no Hanashi =

Single by ClariS

from the album Birthday
- Released: February 1, 2012
- Recorded: 2012
- Genre: J-pop
- Length: 4:18
- Label: SME
- Songwriter: Ryo

ClariS singles chronology
"Nexus" (2011)	"Naisho no Hanashi" (2012)	"Wake Up" (2012)

Audio sample
- A 30-second sample from "Naisho no Hanashi", featuring ClariS singing the end the first verse and chorus.: file; help

"Naisho no Hanashi" (ナイショの話) is a pop song by the Japanese duo and idol unit ClariS, written by Ryo. It was released as the unit's fourth single on February 1, 2012, by SME Records. The song was used as the ending theme to the 2012 anime series Nisemonogatari. A music video was produced for "Naisho no Hanashi", directed by Kazuaki Nakamura. The single peaked at No. 2 on Japan's weekly Oricon singles chart.

== Composition ==
"Naisho no Hanashi" is a J-pop song with instrumentation from electric and bass guitars and drums. According to a book of sheet music published by Shinko Music Entertainment, it is set in common time and moves at a tempo of 194 beats per minute. Beginning in the A major key, the introduction starts with ClariS' vocals and adds drums and guitars to transition into the first verse followed by the chorus. After a short bridge, this pattern is repeated for the second verse and chorus featuring the same music with different lyrics. A break is used to transition into the chorus, immediately followed by another chorus as the outro in B-flat major. An instrumental coda is used to close the song.

Clara and Alice were already big fans of Ryo's music before singing the song and were very excited at the prospect of working with him. Per Ryo's request, Clara and Alice were recorded doing the count at the beginning of the song five separate times: normally, playing innocent, using a hoarse voice, acting excited, and acting energetic. According to Alice, the lyrics express the feelings of irritation and anguish of a girl with a one-sided crush on someone. Alice thought about the girl's feelings as she sang it. The cover artwork features a translucent ice pop with a bite taken out of it containing frozen fruit with "ClariS" printed on it. The art direction and design was handled by Motohiro Yamazaki.

== Release and reception ==
"Naisho no Hanashi" was released in a regular edition and two limited editions on February 1, 2012, as a CD by SME Records in Japan. One of the limited edition versions was packaged with Nisemonogatari artwork and also contained a short version of "Naisho no Hanashi" instead of its instrumental version. The other limited-edition version came bundled with a DVD containing the music video for "Naisho no Hanashi". The song peaked at No. 2 on Japan's weekly Oricon singles chart, selling over 35,000 copies in its first week of sales, and charted for 12 weeks. "Naisho no Hanashi" debuted and peaked on the Billboard Japan Hot 100 at No. 6.

== Music video ==
The music video is entirely animated and is directed by Kazuaki Nakamura. It begins with the illustrations of Clara and Alice by Akio Watanabe, which are shown throughout the video over various rapidly changing patterns. Animated silhouettes of the girls shown to be running are also seen throughout the video, either alongside the previous illustrations, now semi-animated, or simply overlaid on top of the patterns, some of which are kaleidoscopic in nature. Early 20th-century architecture, as well as a tram and a vintage car, also appear in the video. It concludes with Watanabe's illustration in an antique picture frame alongside an antique record player.

== Track listing ==
No.	Title	Lyrics	Music	Arrangement	Length
1.	"Naisho no Hanashi" (ナイショの話 Secret Conversation)	Ryo	Ryo	Ryo, Takuya	4:18
2.	"I'm in love'"	Mayuko Maruyama	Mayuko Maruyama	Mayuko Maruyama	4:23
3.	"Hontō wa" (本当は The Truth is)	Carlos K.	Carlos K.	Carlos K.	4:19
4.	"Naisho no Hanashi (Instrumental)" (ナイショの話 Secret Conversation)		Ryo	Ryo, Takuya	4:18
Total length:					17:18

Nisemonogatari limited edition
No.	Title	Lyrics	Music	Arrangement	Length
1.	"Naisho no Hanashi" (ナイショの話 Secret Conversation)	Ryo	Ryo	Ryo, Takuya	4:18
2.	"I'm in love'"	Mayuko Maruyama	Mayuko Maruyama	Mayuko Maruyama	4:23
3.	"Hontō wa" (本当は The Truth is)	Carlos K.	Carlos K.	Carlos K.	4:19
4.	"Naisho no Hanashi (TV Mix)" (ナイショの話 Secret Conversation)		Ryo	Ryo, Takuya	1:32
Total length:					14:32

DVD
No.	Title	Length
1.	"Naisho no Hanashi" (Music Video)	4:18

== Personnel ==
ClariS

- Clara – vocals
- Alice – vocals

Production

- Shunroku Hitani – mixer
- Takashi Koiwa – mixer
- Yuji Chinone – mastering
- Motohiro Yamazaki – art direction, design

== Charts ==
Chart (2012)	Peak position
Japan Billboard Japan Hot 100	6
Japan Oricon Weekly Singles	2
