= Wake Up (ClariS song) =

Single by ClariS

from the album Second Story
- Released: August 15, 2012
- Recorded: 2012
- Genre: J-pop, synthpop
- Length: 4:13
- Label: SME
- Songwriter: Mayuko Maruyama

ClariS singles chronology
"Naisho no Hanashi" (2012)	"Wake Up" (2012)	"Luminous" (2012)

Audio sample
- A 28-second sample from "Wake Up", featuring ClariS singing the end the first verse and chorus.: file; help

"Wake Up" is a pop song by the Japanese duo and idol unit ClariS, written by Mayuko Maruyama. It was released as the unit's fifth single on August 15, 2012, by SME Records. The song was used as the opening theme to the 2012 anime series Moyashimon Returns. A music video was produced for "Wake Up", directed by Junya Morita. The single peaked at No. 12 on Japan's weekly Oricon singles chart.

== Composition ==
"Wake Up" is a synthpop song with instrumentation from a synthesizer. It is set in common time and moves at a tempo of 132 beats per minute in the G major key throughout the song. The introduction starts with the synthesized music and moves into the first verse with ClariS' vocals followed by the chorus. After a bridge, this pattern is repeated for the second verse and chorus featuring the same music with different lyrics. A break is used to transition into the third verse, immediately followed by the chorus as the outro. A coda is used to close the song.

According to Clara and Alice, the songwriter Mayuko Maruyama has a strong understanding of ClariS' image and writes music for them that matches their feelings. Lyrically, Alice describes it as a "girly" song about the excitement that accompanies becoming interested in someone but not yet knowing what to do. Clara and Alice related the lyrics referring to a transition to a new lifestyle to their enrollment into high school earlier in 2012. The cover artwork features a pink macaron with blue filling and "ClariS" printed on top of it. The art direction and design was handled by Tatsuo Murai.

== Release and reception ==
"Wake Up" was released in limited and regular editions on August 15, 2012, as a CD by SME Records in Japan. The limited edition was packaged with Moyashimon artwork and came bundled with a DVD containing the music video for "Wake Up" and a non-credit opening video from Moyashimon Returns. The song peaked at No. 12 on Japan's weekly Oricon singles chart and charted for 9 weeks. "Wake Up" debuted and peaked on the Billboard Japan Hot 100 at No. 45.

== Music video ==
The music video is entirely animated and is directed by Junya Morita, with character design by Satomi Higuchi. It begins with anime depictions of Clara and Alice and shows the microbes from Moyashimon throughout the video. The microbes are initially shown dancing around an alarm clock, and chibi versions of Clara and Alice are also introduced. It moves on to the microbes and the girls on a swing, followed by them all floating in the air. It then moves on to the original depictions of Clara and Alice performing on a stage with a crowd of microbes in the background. The chibi versions of the girls also join the crowd and dance down towards the stage. It concludes with a shot of the girls with the microbes around them.

== Track listing ==
No.	Title	Lyrics	Music	Arrangement	Length
1.	"Wake Up"	Mayuko Maruyama	Mayuko Maruyama	Mayuko Maruyama	4:13
2.	"Nakanai yo" (泣かないよ I Won't Cry)	Ryōsuke Shigenaga	Ryōsuke Shigenaga	Ryōsuke Shigenaga	4:24
3.	"A Moment"	Ion Okumura	Makoto Sakuma	Atsushi Yuasa	4:52
4.	"Wake Up (Instrumental)"		Mayuko Maruyama	Mayuko Maruyama	4:13
Total length:					17:43

Moyashimon limited edition
No.	Title	Lyrics	Music	Arrangement	Length
1.	"Wake Up"	Mayuko Maruyama	Mayuko Maruyama	Mayuko Maruyama	4:13
2.	"Nakanai yo" (泣かないよ I Won't Cry)	Ryōsuke Shigenaga	Ryōsuke Shigenaga	Ryōsuke Shigenaga	4:24
3.	"A Moment"	Ion Okumura	Makoto Sakuma	Atsushi Yuasa	4:52
4.	"Wake Up (TV Mix)"	Mayuko Maruyama	Mayuko Maruyama	Mayuko Maruyama	1:33
Total length:					15:05

DVD
No.	Title	Length
1.	"Moyashimon Returns Non-credit OP" (もやしもん リターンズ ノンクレジットOP)	1:33
2.	"Wake Up" (Music Video)	1:31
Total length:		3:04

== Personnel ==
ClariS

- Clara – vocals
- Alice – vocals

Additional musicians

- Masaomi Shiroishi – guitar
- Hiroomi Shitara – guitar
- Yūto Matsumoto – bass
- Atsushi Yuasa – bass
- Ryōsuke Shigenaga – keyboard

Production

- Takashi Koiwa – mixer
- Yuji Chinone – mastering
- Tatsuo Murai – art direction, design

== Charts ==
Chart (2012)	Peak position
Japan Billboard Japan Hot 100	45
Japan Oricon Weekly Singles	12
