= ClariS =

Japanese pop band

Background information
- Origin: Hokkaido, Japan
- Genres: Synth-pop; J-pop; Anison
- Years active: 2009–present
- Labels: SME Records (2010–2017); Sacra Music (2017–present)
- Members: Clara; Elly; Anna
- Past members: Alice; Karen
- Website: www.clarismusic.jp

ClariS is a Japanese pop music group formed in 2009, originally composed of Hokkaido junior high schoolers Clara and Alice. Once a duo, the lineup consisted of the two before Alice's departure in mid-2014, with Karen joining later that year. Following Karen's departure in 2024, Elly and Anna joined Claris in early 2025.

Clara and Alice began singing covers and submitting them to Japanese video sharing website Niconico between 2009 and 2010. ClariS later signed to SME Records and released their debut single "Irony" in October 2010. Three more singles were released between 2011 and 2012, followed by their debut album Birthday (2012). Birthday was awarded a Gold Disc by the Recording Industry Association of Japan for having exceeded 100,000 copies shipped in a single year. Six more singles were released between 2012 and 2014, which were featured on their second album Second Story (2013) and third album Party Time (2014). ClariS moved to the Sacra Music record label under Sony Music Entertainment Japan in 2017.

ClariS' music has been featured in anime series such as Oreimo, Puella Magi Madoka Magica, Nisemonogatari, Nisekoi, and Eromanga Sensei. They have also performed at the Nippon Budokan, and at anime music events in Japan such as Animax Musix and Animelo Summer Live. In November 2017, they made their first overseas appearance at Anime Festival Asia in Singapore.

The group was known for its members not showing their faces in public or revealing their identities. The group's members wear masks during live performances, and their persona has been represented by illustrations drawn by various artists for promotional material. However, they unmasked their faces twice while performing at their Pacifico Yokohama concert in 2017 and during their 10th anniversary concert in 2020. In 2022, they unmasked their faces in a music video for a remake of their song "Connect".

== Name ==
ClariS is a portmanteau of the pseudonyms Clara and Alice, when the two were known as "Alice Clara" on Niconico, and was picked as a homage to the character Clarisse from the anime film The Castle of Cagliostro. As listed on their website, "ClariS" can also carry the meaning of the Latin word clarus, which means "clear" and "bright".

== History ==
=== 2009–2011: Formation, debut, and anisong success ===
On October 10, 2009, Clara and Alice submitted a cover of the Vocaloid song "Step to You" onto the Niconico website as "Alice Clara", marking their official debut. The two would then go on to release seven more covers later that year.

On April 24, 2010, the publisher Sony Magazines under Sony Music Entertainment Japan launched the anime music magazine LisAni! with an attached CD containing the original song "Drop" composed by Kz of Livetune and sung by ClariS. ClariS released five more covers for the year, ending with the song "Listen!!" from the anime K-On!! as their 13th cover submitted on June 5. On July 24, the second issue of LisAni! was released with another attached CD containing the original song "Kimi no Yume o Miyō" (君の夢を見よう), again composed by Kz and sung by ClariS. A single containing both songs was released exclusively at Comiket 78 on August 13. By September, ClariS had signed to SME Records, much to the duo's disbelief. AClariS released their major debut single "Irony" on October 20. Composed by Kz, "Irony" debuted at No. 7 on Oricon's weekly singles chart, and was used as the opening theme of the anime television series Oreimo. Good Smile Company would later release a Nendoroid Petit set of ClariS in January 2012 based on the illustrations by Hiro Kanzaki for "Irony".

On February 2, 2011, ClariS released their second single "Connect" (コネクト). "Connect" debuted at No. 5 on Oricon's weekly singles chart, and was used as the opening theme of the 2011 anime television series Puella Magi Madoka Magica. "Connect" was later awarded the Gold Disc by the Recording Industry Association of Japan (RIAJ) later in January 2012 for having exceeded 100,000 copies shipped in a single year. ClariS contributed the song "True Blue" on the Zone tribute album Zone Tribute: Kimi ga Kureta Mono (ZONEトリビュート～君がくれたもの～) released on August 10; "True Blue" is a cover of Zone's 2003 single. ClariS released their third single "Nexus" on September 14, and it debuted at No. 5 on Oricon's weekly singles chart. Again composed by Kz, "Nexus" was used as the opening theme of the Ore no Imōto ga Konna ni Kawaii Wake ga Nai Portable ga Tsuzuku Wake ga Nai video game, as well as the theme song for the ninth volume of the Ore no Imōto ga Konna ni Kawaii Wake ga Nai light novels; ClariS make a cameo appearance in the same volume. The song "Don't Cry" on the "Nexus" single was used as the theme song for volume 0.5 of Shueisha's Aoharu magazine.

=== 2012–2014: Debut album release, Alice's departure, and Karen's debut ===
ClariS released their fourth single "Naisho no Hanashi" (ナイショの話; "Secret Conversation") on February 1, 2012, and it debuted at No. 2 on Oricon's weekly singles chart. "Naisho no Hanashi" was composed by Ryo of Supercell and is used as the ending theme of the 2012 anime television series Nisemonogatari. Clara and Alice graduated from junior high school in March 2012. ClariS released their debut studio album Birthday on April 11. The album was released in three editions: a regular CD edition, a limited edition bundled with a DVD, and another limited edition bundled with two Nendoroid Petit figures of ClariS based on the illustrations of Clara and Alice by Ume Aoki for "Connect", and a bonus CD with two Nendoroid theme songs. Birthday was awarded a Gold Disc by the RIAJ in May 2012. ClariS released their fifth single "Wake Up" on August 15; the song was used as the opening theme to the 2012 anime television series Moyashimon Returns. Their sixth single "Luminous" (ルミナス) was released on October 10; the song was used as the opening theme to the first two Puella Magi Madoka Magica anime films. "Luminous" was awarded a Gold Disc by the RIAJ in December 2014.

ClariS's seventh single "Reunion", composed by Kz, was released on April 17, 2013, which was used for the opening theme to the 2013 anime television series Ore no Imōto ga Konna ni Kawaii Wake ga Nai., the series' second season. ClariS released their second studio album Second Story on June 26. Their eighth single "Colorful" (カラフル) was released on October 30, which was used for the opening theme to the film Puella Magi Madoka Magica: Rebellion.

ClariS made their first live performance at Zepp Tokyo on January 5, 2014, where they performed "Reunion" at a sold-out event behind a curtain and only visible as silhouettes. Their ninth single "Click", composed by Kz, was released on January 29, which was used for the first opening theme to the 2014 anime television series Nisekoi. Their tenth single "Step", again composed by Kz, was released on April 16, which was used for the second opening theme to Nisekoi. ClariS released their third studio album Party Time on June 4, which was Alice's last contribution to ClariS.

Following Alice's departure, Clara denied rumors that ClariS would disband. On November 8, volume 19 of M-ON! Entertainment's LisAni! magazine was released with an attached CD containing the original song "Clear Sky" sung by ClariS, now composed of Clara and Karen, who, like Clara, was still in high school at the time.

=== 2015–2019: Subsequent album releases, label move, and continued success ===
On January 7, 2015, ClariS released their 11th single "Border", which was used for the ending theme to the 2014 anime series Tsukimonogatari. ClariS performed live at the LisAni! Live-5 concert on January 25 at the Nippon Budokan. ClariS released their first compilation album ClariS: Single Best 1st on April 15. ClariS released their 12th single "Anemone" (アネモネ) on July 29, which was used for the ending theme to the 2015 anime series Classroom Crisis. ClariS performed live at Zepp Tokyo on July 31. ClariS released their 13th single "Prism" on November 25; the song was used to promote the 40th anniversary of Sanrio's mascots Kiki and Lala.

On March 2, 2016, ClariS released their first EP Spring Tracks: Haru no Uta (Spring Tracks -春のうた-). ClariS released their 14th single "Gravity" on July 27, which was used for the first ending theme to the 2016 anime series Qualidea Code. ClariS collaborated with Garnidelia in performing the song "Clever" released on September 14, which was used for the third ending theme to Qualidea Code. ClariS released their 15th single "Again" on November 30, which was used for the theme song of the video game Akiba's Beat.

On January 25, 2017, ClariS released their fourth studio album Fairy Castle. ClariS performed their first concert at Nippon Budokan on February 10. They then moved to the Sacra Music record label under Sony Music Entertainment Japan in April. They released their 16th single "Hitorigoto" (ヒトリゴト, Soliloquy) on April 26, which was used for the opening theme to the 2017 anime series Eromanga Sensei. They released their 17th single "Shiori" on September 13, which was used for the ending theme to the second season of the anime series Owarimonogatari. They revealed their faces during their second concert in Pacifico Yokohama National Hall Convention on September 16, 2017. They also appeared at Animelo Summer Live 2017. They made their first appearance at a foreign anime convention at Anime Festival Asia in Singapore in November 2017.

On January 20, 2018, their 18th single "Primalove" was released digitally, receiving a physical release on February 28; the song became the ending theme of the 2018 anime series Beatless. They released their 19th single "CheerS" digitally on August 4, similarly receiving a physical release later on August 15, and used for the ending theme to the 2018 anime series Cells at Work!. They released their fifth studio album Fairy Party on November 21.

ClariS released their second EP Summer Tracks: Natsu no Uta (Summer Tracks -夏のうた-) on August 14, 2019.

=== 2020–2024: 10th year anniversary, face reveals, and Karen's departure ===
They released their 20th single "Alethea / Signal" (アリシア/シグナル) on March 4, 2020; "Alethea" is used as the ending theme to the 2020 anime series Magia Record. "Signal" was used as an image song for the Magia Record mobile game app; "Signal" was originally released digitally on August 13, 2019. On February 17, 2021, their 21st single "Fight!!" was released, which was used for the ending theme to the second season of the anime series Cells at Work!. On August 3, 2022, they released the single "Alive"; the title song was used as the opening theme to the anime series Lycoris Recoil. On June 8, 2023, the duo released a cover of Wink's 1989 single "Samishii Nettaigyo", featuring an arrangement nearly identical to the original. The music video is structured as a segment on the 1980s music countdown television show The Best Ten, complete with presenters resembling Hiroshi Kume and Tetsuko Kuroyanagi. ClariS performed in Brazil at Anime Friends in July. On September 1, ClariS announced that Karen would leave the group following their "ClariS Autumn Tour 2024", which ran from October to November.

=== 2025–present: Elly and Anna's debut ===
After Karen's departure in November 2024, ClariS restarted as a trio at the "LisAni! Live 2025" event on January 25, 2025, with two new members, Elly and Anna. On July 11, 2025, ClariS released their 29th single, "Umitsuki", which was used as the opening theme for Rent-A-Girlfriend's fourth season. This marks ClariS's first single as a trio. On April 12, 2026, ClariS released "Revive", their 30th single, for the anime adaptation of Scum of the Brave. On July 5, 2026, Claris released their 31st single, "Hitokoto" (ヒトコト; 'A Word'), for the The Ogre's Bride. On October 24, 2026, Claris released the music video for their 32nd single, "Synchro Blue" (シンクロブルー), which was used for the opening theme for Vertex Force. The single will be released on streaming platforms on November 11, 2026.

== Image ==
Much focus was put on Clara and Alice being in junior high school at the time of their debut. From early on when they uploaded their covers onto Niconico, there was some disbelief whether the girls were actually in junior high school due to their adult-sounding voices. Despite this, Clara and Alice were described as simply normal junior high school girls; composer Kz felt much of their appeal came from them being in junior high school and felt their future potential played a part in it. Their original anonymity was also emphasized for this reason in order to place priority on their school work, with the two preserving such with pseudonyms, as well as donning masks whilst performing. Additionally, to further preserve said anonymity, the two had not told anyone they knew (aside from their families) that they had debuted as music artists. During their junior high and high school years, ClariS had not released photos of themselves to the public, instead employing illustrators to draw their likenesses.

The group is known for their fantastical image; when drawn, Clara is depicted wearing pastel pink items with a crescent moon used as a motif, and Alice is shown wearing blue items with a sun motif, stemming from their personal preferences. Karen was depicted wearing pastel green items, and images of stars were used to represent her. Following the debuts of Elly and Anna, the two were represented with the colors blue and orange.

ClariS made their first face reveal in a 2017 concert, at Pacific Yokohama. During their tenth year anniversary, Clara and Karen both unveiled their faces on their online 10th anniversary concert in 2020. Since then, the two have made appearances in-person, namely collaborating with THE FIRST TAKE in 2022 for "Connect" and "Alive", and in 2024 with "Hitorigoto".

== Members ==
Originally a duo, ClariS was composed of Clara and Alice, who met at music school as classmates. With the latter departing in 2014 to focus on her studies, Karen, a friend of Clara's who was also a classmate at same music school, was nominated by Clara to become the second member of ClariS.

After 10 years, in 2024, Karen left the group, citing her desire to get married and raise a family. On January 25, 2025, members Elly and Anna debuted.

Current members

- Clara (クララ) (2009–present)
- Elly (エリー) (2025–present)
- Anna (アンナ) (2025–present)

Former members

- Alice (アリス) (2009–2014)
- Karen (カレン) (2014–2024)

== Discography ==
- Birthday (2012)
- Second Story (2013)
- Party Time (2014)
- Fairy Castle (2017)
- Fairy Party (2018)
- Parfaitone (2022)
- Iris (2024)

=== Niconico cover songs ===
#	Upload date	Song	Original artist(s)	Notes
1	October 10, 2009	"Step to You"	40meter-P	Vocaloid songs originally sung by Hatsune Miku.
2	October 17, 2009	"Black Rock Shooter (2M Mix)" (ブラック★ロックシューター)	Supercell	Vocaloid songs originally sung by Hatsune Miku.
3	November 3, 2009	"Scrap & Build"	40meter-P	Vocaloid songs originally sung by Hatsune Miku.
4	November 14, 2009	"Watashi ga Kami o Kitta Riyū" (私が髪を切った理由)	40meter-P	Vocaloid songs originally sung by Hatsune Miku.
5	November 29, 2009	"Only My Railgun"	fripSide	TV anime A Certain Scientific Railgun first opening theme.
6	December 12, 2009	"Kimi no Shiranai Monogatari" (君の知らない物語)	Supercell	TV anime Bakemonogatari ending theme.
7	December 26, 2009	"Amefuri" (アメフリ)	Koko	Composed by Kz of Livetune.
8	December 31, 2009	"Lion" (ライオン)	May'n, Megumi Nakajima	TV anime Macross Frontier second opening theme. A full cover version was uploaded on January 16, 2010.
9	February 6, 2010	"Finder" (ファインダー)	Kz of Livetune	Vocaloid song originally sung by Hatsune Miku.
10	March 5, 2010	"Level 5 (Judgelight)"	fripSide	TV anime A Certain Scientific Railgun second opening theme.
11	April 3, 2010	"Polyrhythm" (ポリリズム)	Perfume	Composed by Yasutaka Nakata.
12	May 8, 2010	"Don't Say 'Lazy'"	Yōko Hikasa, Aki Toyosaki, Satomi Satō and Minako Kotobuki	TV anime K-On! ending theme.
13	June 5, 2010	"Listen!!"	Yōko Hikasa, Aki Toyosaki, Satomi Satō, Minako Kotobuki and Ayana Taketatsu	TV anime K-On!! first ending theme.
