= Masayuki Ishikawa =

Japanese manga artist

Masayuki Ishikawa 石川 雅之
- Born: October 23, 1974 (age 52) Sakai, Osaka Prefecture
- Notable works: Moyasimon: Tales of Agriculture; Maria the Virgin Witch
- Awards: 32nd Kodansha Manga Award General category (2008); Tezuka Osamu Cultural Prize (2008)

Masayuki Ishikawa (Japanese: 石川 雅之, Hepburn: Ishikawa Masayuki; born 23 October 1974 in Sakai, Osaka Prefecture) is a Japanese manga artist. He is best known for Moyasimon: Tales of Agriculture and Maria the Virgin Witch; both of which were adapted into anime television series.

== Career ==
He made his debut as a manga artist in 1997 with the short story Nippon Seifu Chokkatsu Kidō Sentai Kōmuin V in the magazine Bessatsu Young Magazine. In 1999 he won the Tetsuya Chiba Award for the short story Kami no Sumu Yama, which was later collected in the collection Hitokiri Ryōma.

His commercial and critical breakthrough came in 2004 with the series Moyasimon: Tales of Agriculture, which was serialized in the magazine Evening. The series won him the Kodansha Manga Award and the Tezuka Osamu Cultural Prize, both in 2008, as well as the Seiun Award in 2015.

He later worked on the series Madowanai Hoshi for the magazines Morning Two from 2015 to 2016, and Morning from 2016 on, set in a world devastated by climate change in which humanity is forced to live in a dome. It completed serialization in 2024.

== Works ==
- Nippon Seifu Chokkatsu Kidō Sentai Kōmuin V (日本政府直轄機動戦隊コームインV) (1997)
- Kataribe (カタリベ) (1998–1999)
- Kami no Sumu Yama (神の棲む山) (1999)
- Shūkan Ishikawa Masayuki (週刊石川雅之) (2002–2003)
  - Kanojo no Kokuhaku (彼女の告白)
- Moyasimon: Tales of Agriculture (もやしもん, Moyashimon) (2004–2014)
- Hitokiri Ryōma (人斬り龍馬) (2005)
- Maria the Virgin Witch (純潔のマリア, Junketsu no Maria) (2008–2013)
- Junketsu no Maria Exhibition (純潔のマリア exhibition) (2014)
- Teşekkür ederim (2014)
- Madowanai Hoshi (惑わない星) (2015–2024)
- Moyashimon+ (もやしもん+) (since 2024)
