= Irony (ClariS song) =

Single by ClariS

from the album Birthday
- Released: October 20, 2010
- Recorded: 2010
- Genre: J-pop, synthpop
- Length: 4:19
- Label: SME
- Songwriter: Kz

ClariS singles chronology
"Irony" (2010)	"Connect" (2011)

Audio sample
- A 32-second sample from "Irony", featuring ClariS singing the chorus after the first verse.: file; help

"Irony" is a pop song by the Japanese duo and idol unit ClariS, written by Kz. It was released as the unit's debut single on October 20, 2010, by SME Records. The song was used as the opening theme to the 2010 anime series Oreimo. A music video was produced for "Irony". The single peaked at No. 7 on Japan's weekly Oricon singles chart.

== Background ==
In preparation for the launch of LisAni!, an anime music magazine published by Sony Magazines under Sony Music Entertainment Japan, the editors aimed to discover new singing talent to showcase in the magazine's debut issue. Kz was brought up early on as a potential candidate to compose a song for LisAni! due in part to his prior activity of uploading original music to the Niconico video sharing website. For this reason, LisAni!'s editors went to Niconico to discover a singer. After some searching for young singers on the website, music critic Akihiro Tomita who had been helping in the search came across covers sung by first-year junior high school students Clara and Alice, who were subsequently chosen to sing the song for the magazine. Tomita then approached Kz to compose the song for the girls' debut.

Kz and ClariS would go on to collaborate on two songs for LisAni! in 2010: "Drop" with the magazine's debut issue released on April 24 and "Kimi no Yume o Miyō" (君の夢を見よう) with the second issue released on July 24. During the production of the 2010 anime series Oreimo, the anime's producer Atsuhiro Iwakami became aware of ClariS via LisAni!. Iwakami took into account that ClariS' members were in junior high school, the same as Kirino Kosaka in Oreimo, and that their voices were very beautiful, so he thought it would be interesting to have them sing the opening theme song for Oreimo, which would later become "Irony".

== Composition ==
"Irony" is a synthpop song with instrumentation from a synthesizer. According to a book of sheet music published by Shinko Music Entertainment, it is set in common time and moves at a tempo of 134 beats per minute in the E major key throughout the song. The introduction starts with the synthesized music accompanying ClariS' vocals in the chorus melody. A bridge is used to transition into the first verse followed by the chorus. After another bridge, this pattern is repeated for the second verse and chorus featuring the same music with different lyrics. A break is used to transition into the third verse, followed by the chorus as the outro. An instrumental coda is used to close the song.

When writing the song, Kz aimed to give it a cheerful feeling with more of a "junior high school student" impression rather than a more mature sensation. For the lyrics, Kz attempted to write from a perspective slightly above that of normal junior high school students with a feeling of stretching oneself. According to Alice, the lyrics express the feeling typical of teen girls like her and Clara who want to be more honest with their feelings. Clara felt the lyrics fit well with Kirino Kosaka's feelings in Oreimo, and both she and Alice were able to easily empathize with the words. The lyrics tell the story of a girl who wishes to grow closer to someone but has trouble conveying her feelings. The cover artwork features chocolate formed into "ClariS" and a parfait topped with a cherry; the design was handled by Motohiro Yamazaki.

== Release and reception ==
"Irony" was released in a regular edition and two limited editions on October 20, 2010, as a CD by SME Records in Japan. One of the limited edition versions was packaged with Oreimo artwork and also contained a short version of "Irony" instead of its instrumental version. The other limited-edition version came bundled with a DVD containing the music video for "Irony". The song peaked at No. 7 on Japan's weekly Oricon singles chart and charted for 27 weeks. "Irony" debuted and peaked on the Billboard Japan Hot 100 at No. 55. In April 2013, "Irony" was certified gold by the Recording Industry Association of Japan (RIAJ) for 100,000 full-track ringtone digital music downloads (Chaku Uta Full).

== Music video ==
The music video was shot in Chiyoda, Tokyo, Japan. It begins with outlined illustrations representing Clara in pink and Alice in blue which are seen throughout the video. A young girl and her mother are shown looking into an ice cream shop at a parfait, which then cuts to a shot of the girl dancing to the music alongside the illustrations of Clara and Alice. Other people are shown in the video in locales around Chiyoda, such as a high school boy and girl and an office worker, who are later shown dancing with the girl. Near the end of the video, many more people join in to dance, and the outlined illustrations of Clara and Alice are filled out to no longer appear as outlines.

== Track listing ==
No.	Title	Lyrics	Music	Arrangement	Length
1.	"Irony"	Kz	Kz	Kz	4:19
2.	"Kokoro no Inryoku" (ココロの引力 Heart's Attractiveness)	Mavie	Tadasu Nakamura	SiZK	3:49
3.	"Neo Moon"	Ion Okumura	Isao Yoshida	Kōhei Yokono	3:59
4.	"Irony (Instrumental)"		Kz	Kz	4:17
Total length:					16:24

Oreimo limited edition
No.	Title	Lyrics	Music	Arrangement	Length
1.	"Irony"	Kz	Kz	Kz	4:19
2.	"Kokoro no Inryoku" (ココロの引力 Heart's Attractiveness)	Mavie	Tadasu Nakamura	SiZK	3:49
3.	"Neo Moon"	Ion Okumura	Isao Yoshida	Kōhei Yokono	3:59
4.	"Irony (TV Mix)"	Kz	Kz	Kz	1:29
Total length:					13:36

DVD
No.	Title	Length
1.	"Irony" (Music Video)	4:19

== Personnel ==
ClariS

- Clara – vocals
- Alice – vocals

Production

- Takashi Koiwa – mixer
- Hidekazu Sakai – mastering
- Motohiro Yamazaki – design

== Charts ==
Chart (2010)	Peak position
Japan Billboard Japan Hot 100	55
Japan Oricon Weekly Singles	7
