= Hitorigoto =

- The regular edition cover

Single by ClariS

from the album Fairy Party
- Released: April 26, 2017
- Recorded: 2017
- Studio: Sony Music Studios Tokyo (Tokyo, Japan)
- Genre: J-pop
- Length: 3:55
- Label: Sacra Music
- Songwriter: Kelly

ClariS singles chronology
| "Again" (2016) | "Hitorigoto" (2017) | "Shiori" (2017) |

Alternative cover
- The limited anime edition cover

Music video
- Hitorigoto -Short Ver- on YouTube

"Hitorigoto" (Japanese: ヒトリゴト; lit. "Soliloquy") is a pop song by the Japanese duo and idol unit ClariS, written by Kelly. It was released as the unit's sixteenth single on April 26, 2017, by Sacra Music. The song was used as the opening theme to the 2017 anime series Eromanga Sensei. It reached number 9 on Japan's weekly Oricon singles chart, and number 13 on Japan Hot 100.

== Release and reception ==
On 10 February 2017, the musical duo ClariS announced at their "ClariS 1st Budōkan Concert ~Futatsu no Kamen to Ushinawareta Taiyō~" (ClariS 1st Budōkan Concert: Two Masks and the Lost Sun) on Friday that they would perform the opening theme song to the 2017 anime series Eromanga Sensei, titled "Hitorigoto" . The song was released on 26 April 2017 on three edition; Regular edition, Limited edition and Limited anime edition. The single reached number 9 on Oricon, 13 on Japan Hot 100, and 3 on Japan Hot Animation with spent 13, 10 and 11 weeks respectively. In June 2017, "Hitorigoto" was certified gold by the Recording Industry Association of Japan (RIAJ) for 100,000 full-track ringtone digital music downloads (Chaku Uta Full). The song was featured in their fifth album "Fairy Party".

== Music video ==
The music video for "Hitorigoto" was directed by Mitsugu Matsumoto. The video shows Clara and Karen singing and dancing in the shadow. (Note: This music video also mark their first appearances on music video, instead of using the animation like their previous MV) Some scene show them doing the things normally, like eat a cake, drink a tea, and playing with some miniatures of the nature like a tree, a grass, and a butterfly. Also, some scene show some miniatures like a rabbit, a cloud, an air balloon, and a horse. The video ends in the scene that show where Clara and Karen doing the things normally, with some miniatures of carnival show in the table.

== Track listing ==
Regular and Limited edition
| No. | Title | Lyrics | Music | Arrangement | Length |
|---|---|---|---|---|---|
| 1. | "Hitorigoto" (ヒトリゴト Soliloquy) | Kelly | Yoichiro Nomura | Yoichiro Nomura | 3:55 |
| 2. | "Irodori" (イロドリ White Bird) | Karen | Atsushi Yuasa | Atsushi Yuasa | 4:41 |
| 3. | "Butterfly Regret" | Chiaki Nagasawa, Saori Nagano | Chiaki Nagasawa, Saori Nagano | Chiaki Nagasawa, Saori Nagano | 4:10 |
| 4. | "Hitorigoto" (ヒトリゴト Soliloquy) (Instrumental) | | Yoichiro Nomura | Yoichiro Nomura | 3:54 |
| Total length: | | | | | 16:40 |

Limited Anime Edition
| No. | Title | Lyrics | Music | Arrangement | Length |
|---|---|---|---|---|---|
| 1. | "Hitorigoto" (ヒトリゴト Soliloquy) | Kelly | Yoichiro Nomura | Yoichiro Nomura | 3:55 |
| 2. | "Irodori" (イロドリ White Bird) | Karen | Atsushi Yuasa | Atsushi Yuasa | 4:41 |
| 3. | "Butterfly Regret" | Chiaki Nagasawa, Saori Nagano | Chiaki Nagasawa, Saori Nagano | Chiaki Nagasawa, Saori Nagano | 4:10 |
| 4. | "Hitorigoto" (ヒトリゴト Soliloquy) (Eromanga Sensei OP ver) | | Yoichiro Nomura | Yoichiro Nomura | 1:34 |
| Total length: | | | | | 14:20 |

DVD Limited Edition
| No. | Title | Length |
|---|---|---|
| 1. | "Hitorigoto" (Music Video) | 3:54 |

== Personnel ==
ClariS

- Clara – vocals
- Karen – vocals

Additional musicians

- Yoichiro Nomura – music arranger
- Atsushi Yuasa - music arranger
- Chiaki Nagasawa - music arranger
- Saori Nagano - music arranger

Production

- Takashi Koiwa – mixer
- Yuji Chinone – mastering

== Charts ==
| Chart (2017) | Peak position |
|---|---|
| Japan Oricon Weekly Singles | 9 |
| Japan Billboard Japan Hot 100 | 13 |
| Japan Billboard Hot Animation | 3 |

== Certifications ==
| Region | Certification | Certified units/sales |
|---|---|---|
| Japan (RIAJ) Digital | Gold | 100,000^{*} |
^{*} Sales figures based on certification alone.

== Release history ==
| Region | Date | Label | Format | Catalog |
|---|---|---|---|---|
| Japan | 26 April 2017 | Sacra Music | CD | VVCL-1012 |
| Japan | 26 April 2017 | Sacra Music | CD+DVD | VVCL-1010 |
| Japan | 26 April 2017 | Sacra Music | CD+DVD | VVCL-1013 |
