= Nexus (ClariS song) =

Single by ClariS

from the album Birthday
- Released: September 14, 2011
- Recorded: 2011
- Genre: J-pop
- Length: 4:52
- Label: SME
- Songwriter: Kz

ClariS singles chronology
"Connect" (2011)	"Nexus" (2011)	"Naisho no Hanashi" (2012)

Audio sample
- A 31-second sample from "Nexus", featuring ClariS singing the end the first verse and chorus.: file; help

"Nexus" is a pop song by the Japanese duo and idol unit ClariS, written by Kz. It was released as the unit's third single on September 14, 2011, by SME Records. The song was used as the theme song for the ninth volume of the Oreimo light novels and the opening theme of the Ore no Imōto ga Konna ni Kawaii Wake ga Nai Portable ga Tsuzuku Wake ga Nai video game. A music video was produced for "Nexus", directed by Kazuaki Nakamura. The single peaked at No. 5 on Japan's weekly Oricon singles chart.

== Composition ==
"Nexus" is a synthpop song with instrumentation from a synthesizer. According to a book of sheet music published by Shinko Music Entertainment, it is set in common time and moves at a tempo of 130 beats per minute in the E-flat major key throughout the song. The introduction starts with the synthesized music and moves into the first verse with ClariS' vocals followed by the chorus. After a short bridge, this pattern is repeated for the second verse and chorus featuring the same music with different lyrics. The third verse starts immediately after the second, followed by another short bridge before the chorus as the outro. A coda accompanied by ClariS' vocals is used to close the song.

When writing the song, Kz aimed to compose a very complex melody that would excite its listeners, and although he loved the final product, he noted that it would be difficult for others to sing it together. According to Clara, the lyrics are connected to Kirino Kosaka and Kuroneko in Oreimo and how they feel towards the protagonist Kyosuke Kosaka. Alice explains how the lyrics tell the story of gradually moving towards a happy ending even if you cannot honestly put your feelings into words. The cover artwork features translucent glass formed into "ClariS" with air bubbles around it from a soft drink, and the art direction and design was handled by Motohiro Yamazaki.

== Release and reception ==
"Nexus" was released in limited and regular editions on September 14, 2011, as a CD by SME Records in Japan. The limited edition was packaged with Oreimo artwork and came bundled with a DVD containing the music video for "Nexus" in short and full versions. The song peaked at No. 5 on Japan's weekly Oricon singles chart, selling 19,478 copies in its first week of sales, and charted for 10 weeks. "Nexus" debuted and peaked on the Billboard Japan Hot 100 at No. 22.

== Music video ==
The music video is entirely animated and is directed by Kazuaki Nakamura. It begins with a computer desktop and the opening of a file which starts the song. The video primarily shows scenes from the 2010 anime series Oreimo blended with semi-animated illustrations of ClariS by Hiro Kanzaki, the original character designer of Oreimo.

== Track listing ==
No.	Title	Lyrics	Music	Arrangement	Length
1.	"Nexus"	Kz	Kz	Kz	4:52
2.	"Don't cry"	Yūki Odagiri	Yūki Odagiri	Yūki Odagiri	4:59
3.	"Anata ni Fit" (アナタニFIT Fit for You)	Hiroo Ōyagi	Hiroo Ōyagi	Hiroo Ōyagi	4:11
4.	"Nexus (Instrumental)"		Kz	Kz	4:52
Total length:					18:54

DVD
No.	Title	Length
1.	"Nexus (full ver.)" (Music Video)	4:52
2.	"Nexus (short ver.)" (Music Video)	2:16
Total length:		7:08

== Personnel ==
ClariS

- Clara – vocals
- Alice – vocals

Production

- Takashi Koiwa – mixer
- Kazuhiro Yamada – mixer
- Yuji Chinone – mastering
- Motohiro Yamazaki – art direction, design

== Charts ==
Chart (2011)	Peak position
Japan Billboard Japan Hot 100	22
Japan Oricon Weekly Singles	5
