= Spring Tracks: Haru no Uta =

EP by ClariS
- Released: March 2, 2016
- Recorded: 2015–2016
- Genre: J-pop
- Length: 24:24
- Label: SME

ClariS chronology
ClariS: Single Best 1st (2015)	Spring Tracks: Haru no Uta (2016)

Spring Tracks: Haru no Uta (Spring Tracks -春のうた-) is an EP by the Japanese pop music duo ClariS, released on March 2, 2016 by SME Records. The EP contains five music tracks, four of which are covers.

== Release and reception ==
Spring Tracks: Haru no Uta was released on March 2, 2016 in a regular edition and a limited edition bundled with five postcards featuring illustrations of ClariS by various artists. For the week of February 29, 2016 on Oricon's weekly albums chart, Spring Tracks: Haru no Uta was reported to have sold 7,503 copies in its first week of sales, peaking at No. 8, and charted for six weeks.

== Track listing ==
No.	Title	Lyrics	Music	Arrangement	Length
1.	"Hirahira Hirara" (ひらひら ひらら)	Ion Okumura	Makoto Sakuma	Atsushi Yuasa	5:13
2.	"Sayonara Memories" (さよならメモリーズ) (Originally recorded by Supercell)	Ryo	Ryo	Koh	6:08
3.	"Sakura" (Originally recorded by Nirgilis)	Acchu Iwata	Ko-ki Ito, Acchu Iwata, Minoru Kurihara	Ryosuke Shigenaga	4:37
4.	"Ashita, Haru ga Kitara" (明日、春が来たら) (Originally recorded by Takako Matsu)	Yūji Sakamoto	Daisuke Hinata	Atsushi Yuasa	4:44
5.	"Akai Sweet Pea" (赤いスイートピー) (Originally recorded by Seiko Matsuda)	Takashi Matsumoto	Yumi Matsutoya	Atsushi Yuasa	3:42
Total length:					24:24
