= Moyasimon: Tales of Agriculture =

Japanese manga series and its adaptations

- Thirteenth tankōbon volume cover (limited edition), featuring (from left to right) Hazuki Oikawa, Tadayasu Sawaki and Kei Yūki; Aspergillus oryzae is shown at their feet

もやしもん (Moyashimon)
- Genre: Comedy; Educational
- Manga
- Written by: Masayuki Ishikawa
- Published by: Kodansha
- English publisher: NA: Del Rey Manga (discontinued)
- Imprint: Evening KC (2004–2013); Morning KC (2014)
- Magazine: Evening; (July 27, 2004 – April 23, 2013); Monthly Morning Two; (June 22, 2013 – January 22, 2014)
- Original run: July 27, 2004 – January 22, 2014
- Volumes: 13
- Anime television series
- Directed by: Yūichirō Yano
- Written by: Natsuko Takahashi
- Music by: Naoki Satō
- Studio: Shirogumi; Telecom Animation Film
- Licensed by: Crunchyroll
- Original network: Fuji TV (Noitamina)
- Original run: October 12, 2007 – December 21, 2007
- Episodes: 11
- Television drama
- Produced by: Naomi Tanaka; Yoshinori Takeda (Fuji TV)
- Written by: Masayuki Ishikawa; Natsuko Takahashi; Junki Takegami; Shinichi Izonume; Daisuke Watanabe
- Music by: Ryo Kamomiya
- Studio: Fuji Television; Asmik Ace Entertainment; Shirogumi; Sony Music Entertainment Japan; Dentsu; Toho
- Original network: Fuji TV (Noitamina)
- Original run: July 9, 2010 – September 17, 2010
- Episodes: 11
- Anime television series

Moyasimon Returns
- Directed by: Yūichirō Yano
- Music by: Takefumi Haketa
- Studio: Shirogumi; Telecom Animation Film
- Licensed by: Crunchyroll
- Original network: Fuji TV (Noitamina)
- Original run: July 6, 2012 – September 14, 2012
- Episodes: 11
- Manga

Moyashimon+
- Written by: Masayuki Ishikawa
- Published by: Kodansha
- Imprint: Afternoon KC
- Magazine: Monthly Afternoon
- Original run: November 25, 2024 – present
- Volumes: 2
- icon

Moyasimon: Tales of Agriculture, known in Japan as Moyashimon (Japanese: もやしもん), is a Japanese manga series by Masayuki Ishikawa. It was serialized in Kodansha's seinen manga magazine Evening from July 2004 to June 2013 and moved to the magazine Monthly Morning Two, where it concluded in January 2014. The series follows Tadayasu Sawaki, a first-year college student at an agricultural university, who has a unique ability to see and communicate with microorganisms. Del Rey Manga licensed the manga, but only released two volumes in English in North America. An 11-episode anime television series adaptation, animated by Shirogumi and Telecom Animation Film, aired between October and December 2007 on Fuji TV's Noitamina programming block. An 11-episode live action adaptation was aired on Noitamina between July and September 2010. An 11-episode animated second season titled Moyasimon Returns aired from July to September 2012. A sequel manga series began serialization in Kodansha's Monthly Afternoon magazine in November 2024.

The manga, anime, and live action series have all been generally well-received by reviewers, with praise received for the artwork and sustaining the viewer's interest through clear presentation of a difficult topic. It won the 2008 Tezuka Osamu Cultural Prize for Grand Prize and the 2008 Kodansha Manga Award for general manga.

== Plot ==
Moyasimon follows the life of Tadayasu Sawaki, a first-year college student at an agricultural university, who has the unique ability to see and communicate with microorganisms. Additionally, these organisms look very different to him, and much larger than what can be seen under a microscope by normal people. This ability has brought him a bit of fame as when he entered the university, Tadayasu discovered that one of the professors there, Keizō Itsuki, already knew about his gift via Tadayasu's grandfather. Professor Itsuki's coworker Haruka Hasegawa has trouble believing what Tadayasu claims at first, but later comes to accept it. Tadayasu enters the university with his good friend Kei Yūki whose family runs a sake brewery.

== Characters ==
Tadayasu Souemon Sawaki (沢木 惣右衛門 直保, Sawaki Souemon Tadayasu)
Voiced by: Daisuke Sakaguchi
Portrayed by: Yuichi Nakamura
Tadayasu Souemon Sawaki is the main protagonist of Moyasimon and attends an agricultural university in Tokyo as a freshman. His middle name is the yagō of his family home; it is usually omitted, and he is called "Tadayasu Sawaki". He is a childhood friend of Kei Yūki and his parents run a mold-starter producer (種麹屋, tane-kōji-ya). He is able to see and communicate with microorganisms. Sawaki is shown to have feelings for Haruka in the live action version.
Kei Yūki (結城 蛍, Yūki Kei)
Voiced by: Mitsuki Saiga
Portrayed by: Azusa Okamoto
Kei is Sawaki's childhood friend and is also a freshman. His parents run a sake brewery (making them customers for the mold starter from Sawaki's parents). Kei disappears from the story soon after he and Sawaki enter college. He comes back cross-dressed in black Gothic Lolita clothing, and reveals he has stronger feelings for Sawaki than initially let on.
Keizō Itsuki (樹 慶蔵, Itsuki Keizō)
Voiced by: Tomomichi Nishimura
Portrayed by: Kurosawa Toshio
Keizō Itsuki is a professor at the university and an acquaintance of Sawaki's family, who know of his ability. His age is a mystery, but there are reports of his works back to World War II.
Haruka Hasegawa (長谷川 遥, Hasegawa Haruka)
Voiced by: Sayaka Ohara
Portrayed by: Natsuki Katō
Haruka Hasegawa is a postgraduate student. She wears a lab coat over revealing clothing. She is a violent, somewhat sadistic woman from a wealthy, over-protective family. Her family arranged a marriage for her, against her will. However, she does not have to marry him until she is finished with her studies at the university. This is the main reason why she decided to stay there until she receives her doctorate. Hasegawa is not very good at communicating with people, and her harsh personality is used to mask this handicap. She has known Itsuki since she was in middle school. Haruka is shown to have feelings for Misato in the manga. Haruka is shown to have feelings for Sawaki in the live action version.
Hazuki Oikawa (及川 葉月, Oikawa Hazuki)
Voiced by: Akemi Kanda
Portrayed by: Haneyuri
Hazuki Oikawa is a freshman at the same agricultural university. She is a compulsive neat freak and always carries disinfectant tissues and antibacterial spray with her.
Kaoru Misato (美里 薫, Misato Kaoru)
Voiced by: Katsuyuki Konishi
Portrayed by: Nishida Koji
Kaoru Misato is a sophomore who tries to use his knowledge of bacteria to earn easy money, who becomes friends with Sawaki. He speaks in the Kansai dialect. He shares a run-down, dirty dorm room with his best friend, Kawahama. Misato is shown to have feelings for Haruka in the manga.
Takuma Kawahama (川浜 拓馬, Kawahama Takuma)
Voiced by: Noriaki Sugiyama
Portrayed by: Kimura Akihiko
Takuma Kawahama is a short, overweight sophomore and Misato's best friend. He is a returnee from Mexico, which amounts to his knowledge of insects and pulque.
Aoi Mutō (武藤 葵, Mutō Aoi)
Voiced by: Mamiko Noto
Portrayed by: Chisun
Possessing the unofficial title of "Miss Agriculture" due to her beauty, Mutō is also an assistant to Itsuki and Hasegawa. She is also president of the UFO club, which she joined to escape reality.
Aya Hirooka (宏岡 亜矢, Hirooka Aya)
Voiced by: Chiaki Takahashi
Portrayed by: Yōko Chōsokabe
Aya is a third-year economics student at the university. She also works as a bartender at a local pub.
Yū Kaneshiro (金城 優, Kaneshiro Yū)
Yū is the keeper of Okinawa proving ground of the agricultural university. She is a look-alike to Kei, except she has dark skin.
Marie (マリー, Marī)
Voiced by: Miyuki Sawashiro
Marie is a French girl Sawaki meets in France. She is born in an old family Burgundy Domaine specializing in wine brewery and speaks fluent Japanese. She wears white Lolita clothing and is the second look-alike to Kei. She is knowledgeable about wine brewery but has some disagreements with her father, who is in charge of the winery business.
Hana Kanō (加納 はな, Kanō Hana)
Hana comes to meet Kei at the Hiyoshi Liquor Shop to sell beer she brews in her farm. She is short, wears glasses, and looks very young.

=== Microorganisms ===
Microorganisms as depicted in Moyasimon

Acetobacter aceti (A.アセチ, A. asechi)
A variety of acetic acid bacteria.
Alternaria alternata (A.アルテルナータ, A. aruterunāta)
Also known as "soot fungus."
Aspergillus awamori (A.アワモリ, A. awamori)
Voiced by: Hisanori Yoshida
Used in the production of awamori.
Aspergillus oryzae (A.オリゼー, A. orizē)
Voiced by: Yumi Touma
A. oryzae is the main character of the microorganism side. Traditionally known in Japan as kōji (麹) and used to saccharify the starches in rice to make sake and shōchū.
Aspergillus sojae (A.ソーエ, A. sōe)
Used to make miso.
Aspergillus niger (A.ニガー, A. nigā)
Used in the production of shōchū.
Bacillus halodurans (B. ハロヂュランス, B. harodyuransu)
Seen on hongeohoe by Tadayasu.
Bacillus subtilis natto (B.ナットー, B. nattō)
Used to make natto.
Cladosporium trichoides (C.トリコイデス, C. torikoidesu)
Voiced by: Moody Katsuyama
Clostridium botulinum (C.ボツリナム, C. botsurinamu)
Cordyceps sinensis (C. シネンシス, C. shinenshisu)
A caterpillar fungus prized in Traditional Chinese medicine.

Hiochi Kin (火落菌)
Lactobacillus homohiochi, Lactobacillus fructivorans the "bad guy" of the series. A fructivoran which makes sake go bad.
Lactobacillus bifidum (L. ビフィダム, L. bifidamu)
Used to make Western yogurt.
Lactobacillus brevis (L. ブレビス, L. burebisu)
Found in fermented vegetables like kimchi and Japanese pickles.
Streptococcus lactis (S.ラクチス, S. rakuchisu)
Lactobacillus plantarum (L. プランタルム, L. purantarumu)
Used to make sauerkraut and other fermented vegetables.
Lactobacillus yogurti (L.ヨグルティ, L. yoguruti)
Used to make Japanese yogurt. Speaks in a very formal accent.
Penicillium chrysogenum (P.クリソゲヌム, P. kurisogenumu)
A common green mold used to produce antibiotics (most notably, penicillin)
Pediococcus pentosaceus (P. ペントサセウス, P. pentosaseusu)
Also seen on hongeohoe by Tadayasu.
Saccharomyces cerevisiae (S.セレビシエ, S. serebishie)
Creates alcohol out of sugars. Hangs around Kei in the anime.
Trichophyton rubrum (T.ルブラム, T. ruburamu)
The cause of Hasegawa's athlete's foot.

== Development ==
In early 2004, the editor-in-chief of Kodansha's Evening magazine at the time, Kazuya Kajiwara, gave Masayuki Ishikawa the opportunity to draw a manga that would appear in that year's 16th issue sold on July 27, 2004. Kajiwara told Ishikawa to draw a storyboard for five chapters, and only after Kajiwara approved the storyboard would Ishikawa be allowed to draw the manuscript for the first chapter. Following this, Ishikawa worked on several proposals for a story about an agricultural university with his supervising editor and submitted them to Kajiwara, but he rejected every one. As the deadline approached, Ishikawa asked his editor what was wrong with his proposals, to which his editor casually suggested that one of the characters could have the ability to see microorganisms with the naked eye. After submitting this idea to Kajiwara, he immediately approved it.

In 2004, Ishikawa was living in Sakai not far from Osaka Prefecture University, so to better understand microorganisms, Ishikawa spent long days from morning until evening reading technical books on microorganisms in the university's library. During this time, Ishikawa always had lunch at the university's dining hall where he would hear students and faculty talking about various topics. This led him to solidify the story's concept about college life using microorganisms as a motif and self-reliance as a theme. The series was originally titled Nōdai Monogatari (農大物語; 'Tales of an Agricultural University'), but this was changed in the second chapter to Nōdai Monogatari Moyasimon (農大物語もやしもん; 'Moyasimon: Tales of an Agricultural University') and then simply Moyasimon with chapter three; the subtitle Tales of Agriculture was added with chapter eight.

Even after serialization began, Kajiwara continued to suggest ideas for future chapters, such as adding the police to one chapter, or including a mysterious microorganism that could threaten humanity. However, Ishikawa did not feel any of these proposals were interesting, and instead decided to work with his editor to get ranked No. 1 among the series serialized in Evening without any other outside help. Shortly thereafter, while Kajiwara went on a short vacation to Germany, Ishikawa and his editor worked feverishly on the next chapter, which ultimately led Moyasimon to achieve a No. 1 ranking for the first time in its history. When writing Moyasimon, Ishikawa aimed to take difficult to understand information from technical books and present it in a way that was easier for readers to grasp. Themes and motifs Ishikawa developed led him to learn more about additional topics to better flesh out the initial idea. When deciding on certain fashion for the characters, Ishikawa wanted clothing that would not degrade with age as new fashion trends were introduced, which is one of the reasons for Haruka Hasegawa's distinctive bondage-esque fashion.

== Media ==
=== Manga ===
Written and illustrated by Masayuki Ishikawa, Moyasimon was serialized in Kodansha's seinen manga magazine Evening from July 27, 2004, in the 16th issue of that year, to April 23, 2013, in the 10th issue of that year. Following this, it moved to Kodansha's Monthly Morning Two magazine and ran in that magazine from the August 2013 issue sold on June 22, 2013, to the March 2014 issue sold on January 22, 2014. The individual chapters were collected and published in 13 tankōbon volumes by Kodansha from May 2005 to March 2014. Limited editions were also released for volumes 3 through 13.

The manga was licensed in North America by Del Rey Manga, but they only released the first two volumes in November 2009 and June 2010. Further English volumes were discontinued after Kodansha USA took over the manga published by Del Rey Manga. The manga is also published by Glénat Manga in France, GP Publishing and later RW Edizioni in Italy, and Sharp Point Press in Taiwan.

In the December 2024 issue of Kodansha's seinen manga magazine Monthly Afternoon released on October 25, 2024, it was announced that Ishikawa would launch a new sequel series in the next month's issue, accompanied by a one-shot story featuring Sawaki and Kei Yūki before they entered university. Titled Moyashimon+ (もやしもん+), it began serialization on November 25, 2024. The first volume was released on October 23, 2025. As of November 20, 2026, two tankōbon volumes has been released.

=== Anime ===
An 11-episode anime adaptation aired on Fuji TV's Noitamina block between October 12 and December 21, 2007. The series was produced by Shirogumi and Telecom Animation Film with Yuichiro Yano as series director. Natsuko Takahashi served as screenwriter with Junichi Takaoka as character designer and Naoki Satō as sound director. The opening theme is "Curriculum" (カリキュラム, Karikyuramu) by Sarasa Ifu and the ending theme is "Rocket" by Polysics. The opening theme video was directed by noted film director Takashi Yamazaki. Crunchyroll streamed the first season of the anime. At the Tokyo International Film Festival, it was explained that over 100 types of bacteria appear in the anime and that a combination of CG animation and live-action shots were used in the animation opening sequence. The anime's original soundtrack was released on November 28, 2007. ASMIK released the anime over 4 DVDs between December 21, 2007, and March 19, 2008. ASMIK also released a DVD box on May 26, 2010, and a Blu-ray box on October 26, 2011. The ninth volume of the manga was released with a CG anime DVD on July 6, 2010, which contained a six-minute short film about the microorganisms.

A second season titled Moyasimon Returns aired on Noitamina for 11 episodes between July 6 and September 14, 2012. (Note: Moyasimon Returns aired on Noitamina on Thursday 24:45, effectively Friday at 12:45 a.m. JST.) Crunchyroll simulcasted the second season of the anime. Yuichiro Yano and Natsuko Takahashi returned as series director and screenwriter. Takefumi Haketa replaced Naoki Satō as sound director. The opening theme is "Wake Up" by ClariS and the ending theme is "Saikin" (最近; 'Recently') by Hiiragi. ASMIK released the second season over 6 DVDs as well as 6 Blu-rays, with the corresponding volumes being released on the same date, between September 5, 2012, and February 6, 2013.

=== Live action TV series ===
Moyasimon has been adapted into a live action television series. It was also broadcast on the mainly anime-based programing block Noitamina that the anime aired on. The series aired on Fuji TV between July 9 and September 17, 2010. (Note: Moyasimon aired on Fuji TV on Thursday 24:45, effectively Friday at 12:45 a.m. JST.) Akira Iwamoto is series director, with Natsuko Takahashi as screenwriter. Shirogumi handled production and visual effects, with a live demonstration of augmented reality technology used for Moyashimon's super deformed germs at the press conference. Funimation announced a license to simulcast the series at their panel at Anime Expo 2010. ASMIK released the live action series over 4 DVDs between December 23, 2010, and March 16, 2011.

== Reception ==
The Moyasimon manga was awarded the Grand Prize for the 12th Tezuka Osamu Cultural Prize in 2008. It was also awarded the 2008 Kodansha Manga Award for general manga. It was selected as one of the best manga in Japan in 2008 by Tamaki Seto. It was nominated for the first Manga Taishō awards in 2008. In 2006, the manga and its animated adaptation were finalists in the 2007 Japan Media Arts Festival. In 2006, the manga was a finalist in the 10th Tezuka Osamu Cultural Prize.

Zoltan Fehervari writing for Cell commends the manga's art for being "generally excellent throughout, with crisp detail, expressive characters, and fluid action." Brigid Alverson commends the manga with "while this series showcases the author's zany sense of humor, the series is so scientifically accurate it's legitimately educational, too!" Ain't It Cool News' Scott Green comments on the presentation of the bacteria in the manga "basically shapes with faces", highlighting the differences between their "broad and cute" character design and Jessica Rabbit. He also praises the art with "characters appear in thought out backgrounds with plenty of line work, an abundance of zip tones, margin illustrations and notes." However the density of the information given leads to "a viscous manga that moves slowly. Even if there aren't dead stops, it doesn't flow easily." Satsuki Murakami and Mio Bryce writing for the International Journal of the Humanities commend the manga by stating that "key concepts are repeatedly presented in the entertaining format, making Moyashimon representative of manga that successfully promotes readers' interest in, and effective understanding of, difficult subjects such as brewing technology." Jason Thompson, in his online appendix to Manga: The Complete Guide, comments that "Ishikawa sometimes errs on the side of too much info, resulting in pages and pages filled with text, and not so much in the way of plot or character development in the macroscopic human world." Carlo Santos from Anime News Network commended Ishikawa's art stating "lots of careful shading to bring out the depth and texture in each scene, as well as distinctive character designs for each of the newcomers."

Ishikawa is an excellent artist. His backgrounds are beautifully detailed and make you feel like you're looking at a real college. For the most part, his characters are also drawn realistically, but he does like to throw in exaggeration for comedic and emotional effect. This realism helps in making the world come alive and drawing the reader into the surreal events. He gives each strain of microorganism its own character design. That's an impressive feat when you consider the sheer number of varieties of microbes that exist.

— Ed Sizemore, Comics Worth Reading

Jake Godek from THEM Anime commends the anime for its portrayal of the microorganism stating that they are "so adorable it's easy to see one in the show and want to hug it." He also praises the "catchy beyond needed" music, however he criticizes the weak story stating "it feels like the story really is being decided on step-by-step during production rather than before it." Carl Kimlinger from Anime News Network commends the anime's setting for "capturing that collegiate feeling: the freedom, the newness, the adventure; the bad roommates, the bizarre school activities, the drunken sexual experimentation." Kimlinger compared the two seasons of anime: "This season is the sharper looking of the two, with cleaner designs and more detailed settings; season two is the more vivid, with brighter colors and more expressive designs. This season's score is sometimes incongruously serious (which actually adds to the humor on occasion), and its fan service level is orders of magnitude higher. (Remember the drunken sexual experimentation? Let's just say no men were involved)." Kimlinger, in his review of the second season, commends the "great ensemble cast" and "pleasing pace" but criticizes the first three episodes of "inconsequential filler and food-science lectures".

Clarissa Graffeo from Anime World Order comments on "gross" practice of preparing kiviak in the live action and Itsuki consumes the fermented meal. Erin Finnegan from Anime News Network comments on the denseness of the live action, comparing the live action to Nodame Cantabile's live action, "which seemed to cover one entire volume of manga per episode." Mania.com's Chris Beveridge comments on the "mildly comical microbes that are reminiscent of the aliens from Toy Story except that they talk more." In a review of the fifth episode, Beveridge criticizes the introduction of gothic lolita girl, saying "that while cute in manga and anime, looks ridiculous in person." A review of the final episode has Beveridge commending the "CG work both for the bacteria and all the campus oddities". He further applauds the live action with "Moyashimon overacts everything in just the right way, rarely taking it too far and instead being just goofy and unrealistic enough to make you laugh while still going with the core concept."

== See also ==
- Silver Spoon, a similar manga and anime series by Hiromu Arakawa set at the fictional Ooezo Agricultural High School
