= Reunion (ClariS song) =

Single by ClariS

from the album Second Story
- Released: April 17, 2013
- Recorded: 2013
- Genre: J-pop, synthpop
- Length: 4:53
- Label: SME
- Songwriter: Kz

ClariS singles chronology
"Luminous" (2012)	"Reunion" (2013)	"Colorful" (2013)

Audio sample
- A 28-second sample from "Reunion", featuring ClariS singing the end the first verse and chorus.: file; help

"Reunion" is a pop song by the Japanese duo and idol unit ClariS, written by Kz. It was released as the unit's seventh single on April 17, 2013, by SME Records. The song was used as the opening theme to the 2013 anime series Ore no Imōto ga Konna ni Kawaii Wake ga Nai.. A music video was produced for "Reunion", directed by Jungo. The single peaked at No. 2 on Japan's weekly Oricon singles chart.

== Composition ==
"Reunion" is a synthpop song with instrumentation from a synthesizer. It is set in common time and moves at a tempo of 135 beats per minute in the E-flat major key throughout the song. The introduction starts with the synthesized music accompanying ClariS' vocals, and uses a bridge to transition into the first verse, followed by the chorus. After another bridge, this pattern is repeated for the second verse and chorus featuring the same music with different lyrics. A break is used to transition into the third verse, immediately followed by the fourth verse in the chorus melody. The chorus is used as the outro, and an instrumental coda is used to close the song.

== Release and reception ==
"Reunion" was released in a regular edition and two limited editions on April 17, 2013, as a CD by SME Records in Japan. One of the limited edition versions was packaged with Oreimo artwork and also contained a short version of "Reunion" instead of its instrumental version. The other limited-edition version came bundled with a DVD containing the music video for "Reunion". The song peaked at No. 2 on Japan's weekly Oricon singles chart and charted for 12 weeks. "Reunion" debuted and peaked on the Billboard Japan Hot 100 at No. 3.

== Music video ==
The music video is entirely animated and is directed by Jungo. It begins with a set of metal gates that open up into a park where trees, flowers and a fountain sprout out of the ground. Semi-animated illustrations of ClariS by Hiro Kanzaki, the original character designer of Oreimo, are introduced singing in front of the fountain. The park is soon replaced with an urban cityscape on a street lined with shops and streetlamps with skyscrapers in the background. A red double-decker bus and other smaller vehicles are also shown during this time. The landscape is once again converted into a twilight view of the skyscrapers behind a large bridge, which soon dims to full night. The scene is replaced with a public school courtyard featuring cherry blossom trees and petals all around Clara and Alice. Shots from the park and street scenes are again shown overlaid with the cherry blossom petals, and it concludes with a shot of the girls at the school.

== Track listing ==
No.	Title	Lyrics	Music	Arrangement	Length
1.	"Reunion"	Kz	Kz	Kz	4:53
2.	"Tik Tak"	Kiyosumi Iida	Kiyosumi Iida	Kiyosumi Iida	4:13
3.	"Mint Gum" (ミントガム Minto Gamu)	Ion Okumura	Makoto Sakuma	Atsushi Yuasa	4:26
4.	"Reunion (Instrumental)"		Kz	Kz	4:53
Total length:					18:27

Oreimo limited edition
No.	Title	Lyrics	Music	Arrangement	Length
1.	"Reunion"	Kz	Kz	Kz	4:53
2.	"Tik Tak"	Kiyosumi Iida	Kiyosumi Iida	Kiyosumi Iida	4:13
3.	"Mint Gum" (ミントガム Minto Gamu)	Ion Okumura	Makoto Sakuma	Atsushi Yuasa	4:26
4.	"Reunion (TV Mix)"	Kz	Kz	Kz	1:30
Total length:					15:04

DVD
No.	Title	Length
1.	"Reunion" (Music Video)	4:53

== Personnel ==
ClariS

- Clara – vocals
- Alice – vocals

Production

- Takashi Koiwa – mixer
- Yuji Chinone – mastering
- Tatsuo Murai – art direction, design

== Charts ==
Chart (2013)	Peak position
Japan Billboard Japan Hot 100	3
Japan Oricon Weekly Singles	2
