= Connect (song) =

Single by ClariS

from the album Birthday
- Released: February 2, 2011
- Recorded: 2011
- Genre: J-pop
- Length: 4:27
- Label: SME
- Songwriter: Shō Watanabe

ClariS singles chronology
| "Irony" (2010) | "Connect" (2011) | "Nexus" (2011) |

Audio sample
- A 23-second sample from "Connect", featuring ClariS singing the first verse as it transitions from C minor to G♭ major at 0:11.: file; help

"Connect" (コネクト, Konekuto) is a pop song by the Japanese duo and idol unit ClariS, written by Shō Watanabe. It was released as the unit's second single on February 2, 2011, by SME Records. The song was used as the opening theme to the 2011 anime series Puella Magi Madoka Magica. A music video was produced for "Connect", directed by Takumi Shiga. The single peaked at No. 5 on Japan's weekly Oricon singles chart, and was later awarded a Gold Disc by the Recording Industry Association of Japan for having exceeded 100,000 copies shipped in a single year.

== Composition ==
"Connect" is a J-pop song with instrumentation from piano, violin, acoustic guitar, electric guitar, drums, and a synthesizer. According to a book of sheet music published by Shinko Music Entertainment, it is set in common time and moves at a tempo of 175 beats per minute. Beginning in the D minor key, the introduction starts with only piano accompanying ClariS' vocals in the chorus melody. A bridge is used in G♭ major with added drums and violin to transition into the first verse in C minor, which shifts back to G♭ major with the chorus. After another bridge, still in G♭ major, this pattern is repeated for the second verse and chorus featuring the same music with different lyrics. The second key shift from C minor to G♭ major is the final key change of the song. A break is used to transition into a short third verse, followed by the chorus as the outro. A coda is used to close the song.

When Shō Watanabe was writing the song, Aniplex producer Atsuhiro Iwakami intervened to change it from its original composition to what it eventually became. Clara initially found it difficult to express her emotion in the first half of the song, so she carefully sang without putting in too much strain on herself. Clara and Alice were able to easily empathize with the lyrics. The cover artwork features multicolored candy balls formed into "ClariS", and the art direction and design was handled by Motohiro Yamazaki.

== Release and reception ==
"Connect" was released in a regular edition and two limited editions on February 2, 2011, as a CD by SME Records in Japan. One of the limited edition versions was packaged with Puella Magi Madoka Magica artwork and also contained a short version of "Connect" instead of its instrumental version. The other limited-edition version came bundled with a DVD containing the music video for "Connect". The song peaked at No. 5 on Japan's weekly Oricon singles chart and charted for 53 weeks. "Connect" debuted and peaked on the Billboard Japan Hot 100 at No. 17. In January 2012, "Connect" was certified gold by the Recording Industry Association of Japan (RIAJ) for having exceeded 100,000 copies shipped in a single year.

== Music video ==
The music video is entirely computer-generated and is directed by Takumi Shiga. It begins with the image of a revolving carousel orbited by two small balls, one pink and the other blue. Throughout the video, various objects are primarily shown revolving while surrounded by numerous multicolored balls, though most of the images consist of fruits and desserts. Other objects shown less prominently include such things as scissors, high heels, a clock, a set of doors and an eyeball. The video concludes with the two pink and blue balls orbiting continuously closer to each other until they overlap.

== Track listing ==
| No. | Title | Lyrics | Music | Arrangement | Length |
|---|---|---|---|---|---|
| 1. | "Connect" (コネクト Konekuto) | Shō Watanabe | Shō Watanabe | Atsushi Yuasa | 4:27 |
| 2. | "Dreamin'" | Toshikazu Kadono | Toshikazu Kadono | Takuya Harada, Toshikazu Kadono | 4:33 |
| 3. | "Kimi to Futari" (キミとふたり Paired with You) | Carlos K. | Carlos K. | Carlos K. | 4:09 |
| 4. | "Connect (Instrumental)" (コネクト Konekuto) | | Shō Watanabe | Atsushi Yuasa | 4:27 |
| Total length: | | | | | 17:48 |

Madoka Magica limited edition
| No. | Title | Lyrics | Music | Arrangement | Length |
|---|---|---|---|---|---|
| 1. | "Connect" (コネクト Konekuto) | Shō Watanabe | Shō Watanabe | Atsushi Yuasa | 4:27 |
| 2. | "Dreamin'" | Toshikazu Kadono | Toshikazu Kadono | Takuya Harada, Toshikazu Kadono | 4:33 |
| 3. | "Kimi to Futari" (キミとふたり Paired with You) | Carlos K. | Carlos K. | Carlos K. | 4:09 |
| 4. | "Connect (TV Mix)" | Shō Watanabe | Shō Watanabe | Atsushi Yuasa | 1:33 |
| Total length: | | | | | 14:55 |

DVD
| No. | Title | Length |
|---|---|---|
| 1. | "Connect" (Music Video) | 4:27 |

== Personnel ==
ClariS

- Clara – vocals
- Alice – vocals

Production

- Takashi Koiwa – mixer
- Kōtarō Kojima – mastering
- Motohiro Yamazaki – art direction, design

== Charts ==
| Chart (2011) | Peak position |
|---|---|
| Japan Billboard Japan Hot 100 | 17 |
| Japan Oricon Weekly Singles | 5 |
