= Livetune =

Japanese electro band

- Kz performing at SMASH! 2025 in Sydney, Australia

Background information
- Origin: Japan
- Genres: J-pop; electro; Shibuya-kei
- Years active: 2007–present
- Labels: Victor Entertainment (2008–2011); Toy's Factory (2012–present); TamStar Records
- Members: Kz
- Past members: Kajuki P

Livetune (stylized in lowercase) is a Japanese electro band which formed in 2007 as a dōjin music circle signed to Toy's Factory. The band originally consisted of two members, Kz and Kajuki P, but Kajuki P left the band in March 2009. Livetune started out by making use of the Hatsune Miku singing synthesizer to produce vocals for songs submitted to the Nico Nico Douga video sharing website. The popularity of the songs led the band to release the independent album Re:package at Comiket 73 in December 2007. Livetune made its major debut with Victor Entertainment with the professional release of their Re:package album in August 2008, which was updated with more songs. Livetune began collaborating with other artists in 2009, and has since composed music for such artists as Kotoko, ClariS, Maon Kurosaki, and fellow dōjin musician Ryo of Supercell.

== Members ==
- Kz (pronounced "K-Zet") (music, lyrics)

Former member

- Kajuki P (music, lyrics) (2007–2009)

== History ==
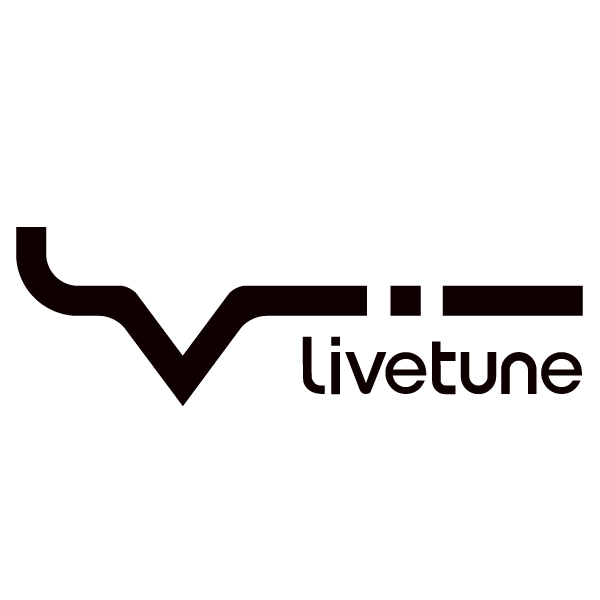
Logo

=== 2007–2011 ===
Following the release of the Vocaloid 2 singing synthesizer software Hatsune Miku on August 31, 2007, Kz submitted a short version of the song "Packaged" to the Nico Nico Douga video sharing website on September 21, 2007 using Miku for the vocals. The full version was submitted on September 24, 2007 and has since been viewed over one million times. The song was also posted on the Muzie music sharing website. Kajuki P released the song "Shooting Star" (シューティング☆スター) on September 23, 2007. Kz and Kajuki P continued to release songs online, leading to the release of their album Re:package at Comiket 73 in December 2007. Re:package contained their previously released songs in addition to several previously unreleased songs. The album was so popular that it was reported to sell out in a flash.

Livetune made their major debut with Victor Entertainment with the professional release of their Re:package album on August 27, 2008. The updated release contained three more songs than the original, as well as the full version of "Over16bit!" and an updated version of "Packaged (piano ver.)". The album obtained a No. 5 ranking on Oricon's weekly albums chart after selling over 20,000 copies in its first week. Livetune released the remix album Re:Mikus on March 25, 2009 under Victor Entertainment, which contained remixed song from R:package, as well as four additional songs. Kajuki P left Livetune in March 2009. Kz collaborated with manga artist Masami Yuki to produce the concept album Crosslight released on August 26, 2009 containing tracks sung by Hatsune Miku and Vocaloid 2 Gumi.

Livetune's first single "Kotchi Muite Baby / Yellow" (こっち向いて Baby / Yellow) is a split single with fellow dōjin musician Ryo of Supercell; both songs are theme songs to the video game Hatsune Miku: Project Diva 2nd. The single was released by Sony Music Direct on July 14, 2010 in Japan. Kz composed the song "Irony" sung by ClariS, which was used as the opening theme song to the anime series Ore no Imōto ga Konna ni Kawaii Wake ga Nai; the single for "Irony" was released on October 20, 2010.

In late 2010, Shibuya-based company INCS toenter established the major record label TamStar Records for musicians and artists who originally made their debut as dōjin music artists online. Livetune joined the label as one of the inaugural members, including others such as Supercell, Gom, Rapbit, and Nagi Yanagi. Livetune collaborated on a compilation album titled TamStar Records Collection Vol. 0 released as a limited edition at Comiket 79 in December 2010. Kz again collaborated with ClariS by composing their third single "Nexus", which was released on September 14, 2011. Kz composed the song "-Mirai-Ressha-" (☆-未来-列車-☆) for Kotoko, which appeared on her 2011 album Hiraku Uchuu Pocket. Kz later collaborated with Kotoko on the song "Love 0 Jetcoaster" on Maon Kurosaki's 2011 album Butterfly Effect; Kz composed the song, and Kotoko wrote the lyrics. Kz composed the songs "New World" and "Stand Up" sung by Twill; both songs are used as opening themes to the anime Digimon Xros Wars.

=== 2012–present ===
In 2012, Livetune left Victor Entertainment and transferred to the record label Toy's Factory. Livetune released the single "Tell Your World" on January 18, 2012 as a digital release online in the iTunes Store available in 217 countries. An EP titled Tell Your World EP was released on March 14, 2012; it reached No. 4 on Oricon's weekly albums chart. On June 21, Kodansha began streaming a 12-minute animated short adaptation of Sai Sumimori's fantasy light novel series Mahō Tsukai Nara Miso o Kue! for which Livetune composed the music. Livetune released the split single "Weekender Girl / Fake Doll" with dōjin musician Hachiōji P on August 29, 2012. Kz and Hachiōji P composed "Weekender Girl", and HachiōjiP composed "Fake Doll"; both songs are sung by Hatsune Miku. "Weekender Girl" is featured in Hatsune Miku: Project DIVA F.

Livetune released the single "Transfer" on September 26, 2012. "Transfer" is sung by Megumi Nakajima, and the single's B-side "Sign" is sung by Yun*chi, which was the ending theme to Mahō Tsukai Nara Miso o Kue!. Livetune contributed a new arrangement of the song "Invoke" on T.M.Revolution's second self-cover album Under:Cover 2 (2013). Livetune released a compilation album titled Re:Dial on March 20, 2013, along with a music video directed by Takashi Murakami. A remix of Zedd's single "Spectrum" by Livetune was featured on the Japanese release of Zedd's album Clarity. Livetune had originally remixed the song as a fan of Zedd's music and Zedd was impressed with the result of the remix, which features English vocals by Hatsune Miku, tuned by CircusP. Kz again collaborated with ClariS by composing their seventh single "Reunion", which is used as the opening theme to the 2013 anime television series Ore no Imōto ga Konna ni Kawaii Wake ga Nai., the series' second season. Livetune's single "Take Your Way" was released on June 5, 2013; the title song is used as the opening theme to the 2013 anime Devil Survivor 2: The Animation. The single "Pink or Black" was released on November 6, 2013 and was used for the promotion of the 6▼Princess by Takashi Murakami for Shu Uemura cosmetics line.

== Discography ==
=== Albums ===
Studio albums
Year	Album details	Peak Oricon chart positions
2008	Re:package: Released: August 27, 2008; Label: Victor Entertainment (VICL-62928, VICL-70077); Format: CD, SHM-CD (Super High Material CD)	5
2014	To: Released: September 10, 2014; Label: Toy's Factory (TFCC-86485, TFCC-86486); Format: CD, Digital Download	33

Extended plays
Year	EP details	Peak Oricon chart positions
2012	Tell Your World EP: Released: March 14, 2012; Label: Toy's Factory (TFCC-86378, TFCC-86379); Format: CD+DVD, CD	4
2014	Decorator EP: Released: March 5, 2014; Label: Toy's Factory (TFCC-86462); Format: CD+DVD, CD	19

Compilation albums
Year	Album details	Peak Oricon chart positions
2013	Re:Dial: Released: March 20, 2013; Label: Toy's Factory (TFCC-86427, TFCC-86428); Format: CD, CD+DVD	12

Remix albums
Year	Album details	Peak Oricon chart positions
2009	Re:Mikus: Released: March 29, 2009; Label: Victor Entertainment (VICL-63271, VICL-70078); Format: CD, SHM-CD	18

=== Singles ===
Year	Song	Peak Oricon chart positions	Album
2012	"Tell Your World"	—	Tell Your World EP
2012	"Transfer"	29	
2013	"Take Your Way"	12	
"—" denotes releases that did not chart.

Collaborations
Year	Song	Peak Oricon chart positions	Album
2010	"Kotchi Muite Baby / Yellow" (with Ryo of Supercell)	9	Re:Dial
2012	"Weekender Girl / Fake Doll" (with Hachiōji P)	21	Re:Dial

=== Various artist compilation albums ===
Year	Song(s)	Album	Notes	Ref.
2009	"Packaged"	Exit Tunes Presents Vocarhythm feat. Hatsune Miku	An album containing original songs sung by Hatsune Miku.	
2009	"Far Away" "Star Story"	Hatsune Miku: Project Diva Original Song Collection	Original soundtrack to the video game Hatsune Miku: Project Diva.	
2009	"Packaged"	Hatsune Miku Best: Memories	Two best of albums sold in commemoration of Hatsune Miku's second anniversary.	
2009	"Last Night, Good Night"	Hatsune Miku Best: Impacts	Two best of albums sold in commemoration of Hatsune Miku's second anniversary.	
2009	"Meari Hito"	Henji ga nai, Tada no Shitsuren no Yō da	Kz composed the song for Haruko Momoi's album.	
2009	"Finder"	Exit Tunes Presents Shinkyoku o Utattemita	An album containing Vocaloid songs sung by popular Internet singers. "Finder" is sung by Ritsuka.	
2009	"Haruka Naru Toki no Kanata e"	Love SQ	A remix album with songs related to Square Enix video games. "Haruka Naru Toki no Kanata e" is from Chrono Trigger.	
2010	"Henji ga nai, Tada no Shitsuren no Yō da"	Momo-i Reixes Akihaba Love	A remix album for Haruko Momoi.	
2010	"Finder" "Yellow"	Hatsune Miku: Project Diva 2nd Nonstop Mix Collection	A compilation album for the video game Hatsune Miku: Project Diva 2nd.	
