= Nqrse =

Japanese rapper and songwriter (born 1995)

- Born: January 13, 1995 (age 31); Nagasaki Prefecture, Japan
- Genres: J-pop; Hip hop
- Occupations: Rapper, songwriter, vocalist
- Years active: 2013–present

Nqrse (stylized in all-lowercase), read as Naruse (Japanese: なるせ; born 13 January 1995), is a Japanese rapper, songwriter, and vocalist from Nagasaki Prefecture.

== Biography and career ==
Nqrse was born in Nagasaki Prefecture, Japan on 13 January, 1995. On March 23, 2013, at the age of 18, he started his musical activities by posting his original rap song "Emotional" on Nico Nico Douga. His Twitter account has over 500,000 followers, and videos featuring him have been viewed over a total of 550 million times. He is known for using a pink-haired girl character as his persona, which contrasts with his low-pitched rapping voice. His first solo EP, "Negative", was released in 2016.

He is a member of Internet rap collective StudioLama, which was founded in 2014. Since 2015, he has toured with other fellow utaite in the "XYZ Tour" series, under which he performed at Yokohama Arena in 2019. In 2017, he released the album "Will O Wisp" in collaboration with singer Araki, for which he went on a tour of the same name. He has also appeared in Mafumafu's Hikikomori-tachi demo Fesu ga Shitai! (ひきこもりたちでもフェスがしたい！, Even if we're shut-ins, we want to do a music fest!) live performances since 2017. Notable venues he has performed in include Saitama Super Arena, Makuhari Messe, and Seibu Dome.

In January 2020, he started activities under the group "AraNaruMey" (あらなるめい), with long-time utaite collaborators Araki and Meychan. Under their YouTube account, the group have been livestreaming and posting weekly, and also going on live tours.

Since 2021, he has been actively releasing his original songs, and his first solo song, "Utakata no Yoru," is ranked on the viral chart.

His favorites are snow, sushi, and snacks.

== Discography ==
=== Albums and EPs ===
Title	Year	Album details	Note
Natsu komi otoshimashita	2016	Released: 31 August 2016; Track listing: 1. N 2. Ginsei; 3. Yomosugara kimi sō fu 4. Yukiatari hattari 5. Mermaid	Joint work with Natsushiro Takaaki.
Negative	2016	Released: 31 December 2016; Track listing: 1. Seiza to mahō (feat. Soraru); 2. Emerald City -Rewind arrange-; 3. Kisaragi station 4. Higaimōzō keitai joshi (Emi) (feat. Araki); 5. skit 6. Parasite (feat. Mafumafu, luz); 7. Mr.montage	First solo EP.
Will O Wisp	2017	Released: 1 September 2017; Track listing: 1. PROLOGUE; 2. Will O Wisp; 3. Internets Disco; 4. STARGAZER; 5. Heather; 6. Discord; 7. Intrusion; 8. IN THIS DIARY; 9. The North Wind and the Sun, 10. Shooting Star	Joint work with Araki.

=== Singles ===
Released	Title	Note
July 24, 2021	Utakata no Yoru	
August 13, 2022	Byoushin	
December 17, 2022	CR Anthem	Featuring Fake Type The official theme song of the professional gaming team Crazy Raccoon.
January 13, 2023	Lemonade	
April 19, 2023	Diorama	Featuring Mafumafu.
May 23, 2023	PUA	Featuring Amatsuki and Tonari no Sakata.
September 18, 2024	Ultra C	Featuring Reol
June 18, 2025	OoedoRanvu -10th Edition-	Featuring Reol
