= Wataru Urata =

Japanese singer and voice actor

- 浦田 わたる
- Born: 9 August 1989 (age 36); Saitama Prefecture, Japan
- Other name: Uratanuki (うらたぬき)
- Occupations: Voice actor, singer (utaite)
- Years active: 2009–present
- Height: 162.5 cm (5 ft 4 in)
- Musical career
- Genres: J-pop; Anison; Vocaloid
- Instrument: Vocals
- Years active: 2014–present
- Member of: Urashimasakatasen
- Website: swallow-p.com/actor/va_urata.html

Wataru Urata (Japanese: 浦田わたる, Hepburn: Urata Wataru; born 9 August 1989), also known professionally as Uratanuki (うらたぬき), is a Japanese singer and voice actor. He is a member and leader of the 4 member Japanese boy band Urashimasakatasen.

== Life and career ==
=== Early life ===
Born as Wataru Takahashi (Japanese: 高橋 渉, Hepburn: Takahashi Wataru) on 9 August 1989 in Saitama Prefecture, Japan

=== 2009–present ===
He has been working under the stage name Uratanuki on NicoNico Douga and YouTube since 2009. His image color is green. The name of his raccoon dog on his shoulder is Yamadanuki, and his listeners are known as Kotanuki.

Uratanuki is named after his real name "Wataru" in Roman letters (Wataru), since when read backward it becomes "Urata". In 2013, his names including animal names were popular, together with the most comfortable Tanuki (raccoon dog), it became Uratanuki.

Along with Tonari no sakata, Shima and Senra, he is a member, as well as leader, of the utaite group Urashimasakatasen. He is on good terms with the utaite singers Mafumafu, Soraru, Amatsuki, and others.

Every Monday, they have a distribution called Monday of Urashimasakatasen (浦島坂田船のげつようび。) live on Niconico douga, Twitcasting and Youtube.

== Filmography ==
=== Anime ===
| Year | Title | Role | Note | Source |
|---|---|---|---|---|
| 2014 | No-Rin | Student | | |
| 2016 | All Out!! | Tomomichi Takebe | | |
| 2016 | Days | Torikai Sho | | |
| 2016 | Rainbow Days | Kakei | | |
| 2017 | Boruto: Naruto Next Generations | Taori Kuroyagi | | |
| 2017 | Pikaia! | Harry | | |
| 2017 | Akashic Records of Bastard Magic Instructor | Student A | | |
| 2017 | In Another World with My Smartphone | Man, soldier, Dullahan | | |
| 2018 | Kaiju Girls | | | |
| 2018 | Sanrio Boys | Kyudo member | | |
| 2018 | Cutie Honey Universe | Announcer, PCIS Investigator 1, Cop, Puppet Panther 1, Honey Corps 1 | | |
| 2018–2020 | Dropkick on My Devil! | Macaulay, Foreign people B | 2 Series | |
| 2018 | Sono Toki, Kanojo wa. | Yuuta, Bartender | | |
| 2018–2020 | Kiratto Pri Chan | Takaya Saegusa | | |
| 2019 | Forest of Piano | Ann Chance | | |
| 2019 | King of Prism: Shiny Seven Stars | Kokoro Gotanda, Contest moderator | | |
| 2019 | Midnight Occult Civil Servants | Constable Nakamura | | |
| 2019–2020 | Ace of Diamond act II | Hiroomi Takatsu | | |
| 2019 | Try Knights | Yukiya Katashiro | | |
| 2019 | Urashima Sakata sen no nichijō | Uratanuki | Himself | |
| 2019 | Actors: Songs Connection | Kagura Sosuke | | |
| 2019 | Case File nº221: Kabukicho | Mattsun | | |
| 2019 | African Office Worker | Subservient rabbit | | |
| 2020 | Toilet-Bound Hanako-kun | Male student A | | |
| 2021 | Ancient Girl's Frame | Bombarder 2 | | |
| 2022 | Smile of the Arsnotoria | Hus, Alfred | | |
| 2022 | Lookism | Lee, Jin Sung | | |
| 2023 | Farming Life in Another World | Gucci | | |

=== Film ===
| Year | Title | Role |
|---|---|---|
| 2016–2017 | King of Prism by Pretty Rhythm | Idol A, Kokoro Gotanda |
| 2016 | Kokuhaku Jikkō Iinkai: Ren'ai Series | Male student B |

=== OVA ===
| Year | Title | Role | Note | Source |
|---|---|---|---|---|
| 2016 | Rainbow Days | Kei | Comic Volume 13 Anime DVD Bundled Version | |

=== ONA ===
| Year | Title | Role | Note | Source |
|---|---|---|---|---|
| 2022 | Gaiken Shijō Shugi | Ryūsei Kitahara | | |

== Discography ==
=== Album ===
| Title | Year | Album details |
|---|---|---|
| Hakozume Clover | 2014 | Released: 17 August 2014; Label: Uratanuki; Formats: CD; Track listing: 1. Hashire; 2. Hydra no Circus; 3. Noisy Rubber Soul; 4. I love you I love you 5. Setsuna Trip; 6. Yume hanabi 7. Soba ni ite 8. Sekai jumyō to saigo no tsuitachi 9. Lost one no Gōkoku; 10. Hōkago Stride (ft.Tonari no sakata); 11. Nōshō sakuretsu Girl; 12. Kashokushō: Idol Shōkōgun; 13. Nakimushi Fantasy; 14. Halo Line; 15. Mayoigo no boku ni 16. Atogasa |
| Remember | 2016 | Released: 8 May 2016; Label: Uratanuki; Formats: CD; Track listing: 1. Poko poko tanuki ni zenbu wo makase!; 2. Kono fuzaketa subarashiki sekai wa, boku no tame ni aru 3. Sakaseyo otome, kurae yo danji 4. Kimiiro ni somaru 5. Koi no sainō 6. Dreamer (Piano arrangement ver.); 7. Yakimochi no kotae 8. Kokuhaku yokō renshū – another story –; 9. Usotsuki majo to haiiro no niji 10. Tsukisase; 11. Ren'ai yūsha 12. Remember (Piano arrangement ver.); 13. Remember |
| GreedyWorld | 2018 | Released: 2 August 2018; Label: Uratanuki; Formats: CD; Track listing: 1. Sect no Chūbatsu; 2. My Shadow; 3. Oxytocin no Dorei-tachi; 4. Itoshi teruga ienai 5. Kotchiwomuite; 6. O tomodachide wa i rarenai 7. Pink; 8. High heel princess (Uratanuki ver.); 9. Diamirai |
| Unlimited | 2019 | Released: 30 July 2019; Label: Uratanuki; Formats: CD; Track listing: 1. Good test ruler 2. GANGEROUS PRINCESS; 3. Paranoid Kyokō geki 4. Yūwaku; 5. Inarilation; 6. Come on tonight 7. Boo boo!; 8. Power of LOVE; 9. Here We Are |
| Date | 2021 | Released: August 2021; Label: Uratanuki; Formats: CD; Track listing: 1. Library libra 2. Bow Wow; 3. You need"ESCALATING"; 4. Orokana orca 5. Scarle; 6. SHIORI; 7. Miwaku no Date plan 8. MAKE WITH LOVE; 9. Love song |
| Love! Love! | 2022 | Released: 1 August 2022; Label: Uratanuki; Formats: CD; Track listing: 1. Dokkyun; 2. Super Darling; 3. Urataneko♀; 4. Mount Rita Girl; 5. Rudia; 6. Kiss mark 7. Ooshiki Ookami; 8. Kaijuu; 9. Again, Again; 10. Love letter 11. Love song (piano arrangement ver.); 12. CLAP! YOUR HANDS! |

=== Single ===
| Title | Year | Release date |
|---|---|---|
| Koi no MAGIC | 2021 | August 6, 2021 |
| SWEETS DATE | 2021 | August 6, 2021 |
| OHAYO | 2021 | October 15, 2021 |

=== Voice Drama CD ===
| Title | Year | Album details |
|---|---|---|
| Boku no seishun nikki 〜 kono kimochi ni kidzuku made 〜 (僕の青春日記 〜この気持ちに気づくまで〜) | 2015 | Released: 26 April 2015; Label: Uratanuki; Formats: CD; Track listing: 1. Heart no atoaji 2. Densha no naka de 3. 2-Dome no chikoku 4. Odaijini; 5. Migime ga akai sakanaya 6. Tachifusagaru; 7. Jikaku shita kimochi 8. Koi no jōsha-ken |
