= Mafumafu =

Japanese singer (born 1991)

- Born: 18 October 1991 (age 34); Tokyo, Japan
- Genres: J-pop; anime song; game music; Vocaloid
- Occupations: Singer; songwriter; composer
- Years active: 2010–present
- Labels: NBCUniversal (2016–2019); A-Sketch (2019–present)
- Member of: After the Rain
- Spouse: Mikeneko (m. 2021–2022)
- Website: uni-mafumafu.jp

YouTube information
- Channel: まふまふちゃんねる
- Subscribers: 3.6 million
- Views: 2.5 billion
- Last updated: 3 March 2026

Mafumafu (Japanese: まふまふ; born October 18, 1991) is a Japanese singer-songwriter. In addition to his solo work, he is one half of the music duo After the Rain with fellow utaite singer Soraru. His broad vocal range, spanning over five octaves, allows him to sing in an extremely high register, and in addition to his original music, he often covers Vocaloid songs in their original key. He represents himself with a white-haired, red-eyed character with a barcode on his left cheek. As of 2025, his YouTube channel has over 3.6 million subscribers, and his videos have amassed over 2.25 billion views.

Mafumafu plays guitar and piano. He has written and produced music for video games, anime, and other artists.

On June 5, 2022, Mafumafu announced on Twitter that after his concerts on June 12 at Tokyo Dome, he would go on an indefinite hiatus from all personal music activities as Mafumafu for the first time in 11 years, citing his medical condition. On January 8, 2023, Mafumafu announced that he would slowly resume activities.

== Early life ==
Mafumafu grew up in a strict household where he had to take multiple lessons, including piano lessons. As a child he wished to become a scientist or an astronomer. His first experience with composing music was when he was in elementary school and composed a ringtone for a flip phone given to him by his father.

He was bullied as a student and felt a disconnection between the upbeat music popular in society and his own situation. He began to feel understood by the music made by rock bands and artists who produced darker songs. He also felt that expressing the reasons and pain he felt about giving up on life was easier to express through music than using words. This led to him wanting to become a musician at the age of 15.

After entering university, he used his tuition exemption to buy Cubase and a guitar. In university, he formed a visual kei rock band with his friends where he played guitar and vocals, vocals, guitar, and drums. The guitarist in the band introduced him to the culture of vocaloid songs and utaite on the internet. This inspired him to upload his songs on the internet.

== Music career ==
He began publishing song cover videos on Niconico in late 2010. In interviews, he has said that he enjoys listening to a variety of music including electronic, and that he was drawn to music because his childhood was painful and he felt he could convey in music the emotions he had difficulty expressing otherwise. He also believes he grows when he is able to overcome the things he did not know or was unable to do before. Since his life in the music industry began, he has stored vocabulary and experiences within himself, which he pulls on when composing and writing lyrics.

While Mafumafu primarily works on his solo dōjin albums, he has done two albums with utaite singer Soraru. On 13 April 2016, they released Crocrest Story under the name After the Rain under the Universal Entertainment Japan label. Mafumafu handled most of the composition and arrangement for the album. He said that he tried to create songs that matched both of their musical ranges, was fun for them, and that drew out both of their strengths. The album reached second place on Oricon's weekly charts.

His first solo tour ran from 15 January to 5 February 2017. On 7 May, Mafumafu hosted Hikikomori-tachi demo Fest ga shitai! (ひきこもりたちでもフェスがしたい！) and performed alongside Soraru, Amatsuki, Urashimasakatasen, luz, un:c, Araki, nqrse, and kradness. On 18 October 2017, he released the album titled Ashita-iro World end (明日色ワールドエンド), an album which looks at the end of the world.

Connected to Disney, an official Disney cover album, was released on 13 March 2019. Mafumafu helped produce the album, as well as performed alongside six other singers. On 22 June 2019, he held a solo live performance at the MetLife Dome with an audience of 35,000 people. On the next day, 23 June, Mafumafu hosted the annual Hikikomori-tachi demo Fest ga shitai! (ひきこもりたちでもフェスがしたい！). In July, Mafumafu released the single Sacrifice (サクリファイス). This was his first time creating music for an anime, this time for the anime To the Abandoned Sacred Beasts (Season 1). His album titled Kagura-iro Artifact (神楽色アーティファクト) was released through A-Sketch Inc. on 16 October. There were 20 songs in the album, more than any other album Mafumafu had previously released. He attempted to select the best 20 songs he was capable of creating and included songs with a variety of musical styles, which was a different trend from previous albums. Mafumafu also wrote the lyrics, composed, and arranged the music for the opening theme of Pokémon Journeys, scheduled to first air on 17 November 2019, on TV Tokyo. The opening theme "One, Two, Three" is sung by After the Rain, Mafumafu and Soraru's music duo, for the first 31 episodes.

On 16 February 2020, Mafumafu was found unconscious in his living room by staff visiting his home. He was transported to a medical institution, where he was diagnosed with cardiogenic syncope.

Mafumafu was scheduled to hold a solo show at the Tokyo Dome on 25 March 2020 as well as his Hikikomori-tachi demo Fest ga shitai! (ひきこもりたちでもフェスがしたい！) in the Tokyo Dome on 26 March. However, he announced on 12 March that he would hold off on the performances due to the impacts of COVID-19. While he did consider postponing the events to a later date, it was officially announced on 31 March that they were canceled.

Sales of Mafumafu's first video release was scheduled to go on sale on 14 October 2020, consisting of video shot during his 2019 performance at the MetLife Dome.

Mafumafu continues to be active on both YouTube and Niconico. He has participated in live shows and summer comic market events. He is currently posting videos with fellow utaite singers and friends Soraru, Amatsuki, Uratanuki, Aho no sakata, as well as game commentator Kiyo.

Mafumafu has a Teru teru bōzu character called Mafuteru (まふてる) which acts as his guardian. Mafuteru is sometimes said to help Mafumafu with the illustrations and editing for his music videos.

The internet series Hikikomori demo maru maru ga shitai! (ひきこもりでも○○がしたい!), also known as Hikimaru (ひきまる), started on 19 December 2018, with appearances by Mafumafu. The second season, Hikimaru 2nd, started on 26 September 2019, with a line up of eight people consisting of Mafumafu, Soraru, Amatsuki, luz, Uratanuki, Shima, Tonari no sakata, and Senra.

Mafumafu appeared in the 72nd NHK Kōhaku Uta Gassen on 31 December 2021, the first utaite to do so.

On 5 June 2022, Mafumafu announced on Twitter that after his following live performances on 11 and 12 June, he would go on an indefinite hiatus from all personal musical activities as Mafumafu for the first time in 11 years, citing his medical condition. He still plans to be active as a songwriter for other artists, as well as continue to participate in group collaborations.

== Other activities ==
On 23 October 2021, Mafumafu, Soraru, VTuber Hal Shibuya (渋谷ハル), and the esports team Crazy Raccoon jointly established the VTuber agency "merise". Merise was later renamed Neo-Porte.

== Personal life ==
For much of his career up to spring 2021, Mafumafu maintained that he could not fall in love and had not been involved in romantic relationships. On January 25, 2024, the weekly tabloid Josei Seven reported that Mafumafu had been married for a short period from December 2021 to July 2022 and was involved in legal proceedings against his ex-wife at the time of the report. Mafumafu confirmed the reports on his blog the next day, explaining that he had been subjected to various emotional abuse, cheating, and defamation through online harassment by his ex-wife, who he referred to as Girl A (A子).

On January 28, the online streamer and VTuber Mikeneko posted a response, confirming she was Girl A in the process. She denied Mafumafu's allegations of cheating, said she did not consider what she did to constitute emotional abuse, and stated she has countersued since her legal team considered Mafumafu's comments against her to be defamatory.

Mikeneko and Mafumafu both released statements on October 8, 2024 announcing that they have dropped legal proceedings against each other. Mafumafu expresses gratefulness for the legal guarantee that "both parties will have no contact or involvement whatsoever."

== Discography ==
=== Album ===
==== Solo albums ====
The highest rank is based on Oricon weekly charts.

#	Released date	Title	Label	Standard	Standard product number	List of recorded songs and benefits	Highest rank
1	11 August 2012	夢色シグナル (Yumeiro signal)	Mafumafu	CD	—	13 Songs CD: 1. AM 4:00; 2. 人生リセットボタン (Jinsei reset button); 3. サクラ唄 (Sakura uta) (Album ver.); 4. 孤独ノ隠レンボ (Kodoku no komo lembo); 5. 千本桜 (Senbonzakura); 6. PM 10:00; 7. イカサマライフゲイム (Ikasama life game); 8. Caseaman (Album ver.); 9. 完全犯罪ラブレター (Kanzen hanzai love letter); 10. ポーカーフェイス (Poker face) feat. Suzumu; 11. カミサマネジマキ (Kamisamane jimaki); 12. AM 5:00; 13. DAYBREAK	
2nd	31 December 2013	刹那色シンドローム (Setsuna-iro syndrome)	Mafumafu	CD	—	16 Songs CD: 1. 京華創造 (Kyō hana sōzō) (Instrumental); 2. 仇返しシンドローム (Ada-gaeshi Syndrome); 3. 命のユースティティア (Inochi no Eustatia); 4. 夢花火 (Yume hanabi); 5. ハッピーチューン (Happy tune); 6. 緑青色の憂鬱 (Ryokushōiro no yūutsu); 7. かなしみのなみにおぼれる (Kanashimi no nami ni oboreru); 8. 永眠童話 (Eimin dōwa) (Instrumental); 9. ラストエフェクト (Last effect); 10. ギガンティックO.T.N (Gigantic O.T.N); 11. 延命治療 (Enmei chiryō) – Arranged version 12. 後書きの始まり、虚無の目次 (Atogaki no hajimari, kyomu no mokuji); 13. ラストリーフ (Last leaf); 14. 睡杯 (Nemu-hai) (Instrumental); --Bonus Track--: 15. 仇返しシンドローム (Ada-gaeshi Syndrome) (Instrumental setsunairo +3 ver.); 16. 緑青色の憂鬱 (Setsuna-iro syndrome) (Instrumental setsunairo ver.)	
3rd	25 April 2015	闇色ナイトパレード (Yami-iro Night parade)	Mafumafu	CD	—	15 Songs CD: 1. [Trance] (Inst); 2. キューソネコカミのすゝめ (Kyūsonekokami no Susu me); 3. 忘却のクオーレ (Bōkyaku no Quare); 4. 林檎花火とソーダの海 (Ringo hanabi to soda no umi); 5. プラスティック (Plastic); 6. ハーテッド・ドール (Hearted Doll); 7. ショパンと氷の白鍵 (Shopan to Kōri no hakken); 8. [Vulgar entertainment] (Inst); 9. 戯曲とデフォルメ都市 (Gikyoku to Deforma toshi); 10. 落書きの隠しかた (Rakugaki no kakushi kata); 11. 空を駆け下りて (Sora o kake orite); 12. クリスナイトパレード (Chris night parade); 13. Septet Minus a fear 14. [Before goodbye] (Inst); 15. 夢と泡沫 (Yume to utakata)	
4th	18 October 2017	明日色ワールドエンド (Ashita-iro World end)	NBCUniversal	First Press Limited Edition A (with benefits)	GNCL-1274	16 Songs CD: 1. [Nexus]; 2. 輪廻転生 (Rin'netensei); 3. 立ち入り禁止 (Tachiiri kinshi); 4. 眠れる森のシンデレラ (Nemurerumori no Cinderella); 5. 水彩銀河のクロニクル (Suisei ginga no Chronicle); 6. 夢のまた夢 (Yume no mata yume); 7. ふたりぼっち (Futaribocchi); 8. [Anonymous]; 9. 罰ゲーム (Batsu Game); 10. フューリー (Fury); 11. 悪魔の証明 (Akuma no shōmei); 12. 恋と微炭酸ソーダ (Koi to bitansan Soda); 13. 常夜の国の遊び方 (Tokoyo no kuni no asobikata); 14. すーぱーぬこになりたい (Super nuko ni naritai); 15. [Lycoris]; 16. 終点 (Shūten)	2
4th	18 October 2017	明日色ワールドエンド (Ashita-iro World end)	NBCUniversal	First limited-edition B (with benefits)	GNCL-1275	16 Songs CD: 1. [Nexus]; 2. 輪廻転生 (Rin'netensei); 3. 立ち入り禁止 (Tachiiri kinshi); 4. 眠れる森のシンデレラ (Nemurerumori no Cinderella); 5. 水彩銀河のクロニクル (Suisei ginga no Chronicle); 6. 夢のまた夢 (Yume no mata yume); 7. ふたりぼっち (Futaribocchi); 8. [Anonymous]; 9. 罰ゲーム (Batsu Game); 10. フューリー (Fury); 11. 悪魔の証明 (Akuma no shōmei); 12. 恋と微炭酸ソーダ (Koi to bitansan Soda); 13. 常夜の国の遊び方 (Tokoyo no kuni no asobikata); 14. すーぱーぬこになりたい (Super nuko ni naritai); 15. [Lycoris]; 16. 終点 (Shūten)	2
4th	18 October 2017	明日色ワールドエンド (Ashita-iro World end)	NBCUniversal	Normal Edition	GNCL-1276	16 Songs CD: 1. [Nexus]; 2. 輪廻転生 (Rin'netensei); 3. 立ち入り禁止 (Tachiiri kinshi); 4. 眠れる森のシンデレラ (Nemurerumori no Cinderella); 5. 水彩銀河のクロニクル (Suisei ginga no Chronicle); 6. 夢のまた夢 (Yume no mata yume); 7. ふたりぼっち (Futaribocchi); 8. [Anonymous]; 9. 罰ゲーム (Batsu Game); 10. フューリー (Fury); 11. 悪魔の証明 (Akuma no shōmei); 12. 恋と微炭酸ソーダ (Koi to bitansan Soda); 13. 常夜の国の遊び方 (Tokoyo no kuni no asobikata); 14. すーぱーぬこになりたい (Super nuko ni naritai); 15. [Lycoris]; 16. 終点 (Shūten)	2
5th	16 October 2019	神楽色アーティファクト (Kagura-iro Artifact)	A-Sketch	First limited-edition A	AZZS-90	20 Songs CD: 1. 忍びのすゝめ (Shinobi no Susume); 2. 自壊プログラム (Jikai Program); 3. サクリファイス (Sacrifice); 4. ジグソーパズル (Jigsaw puzzle); 5. マルファンクション (Malfunction); 6. 朧月 (Oborodzuki); 7. すーぱーぬこになれんかった (Super nuko ni narenkatta); 8. 女の子になりたい (On'nanoko ni naritai); 9. 動かざること山の如し (Ugokazaru koto yama no gotoshi); 10. 君のくれたアステリズム (Kimi no kureta Asterism); 11. リライトザサーガ (Rewrite the saga); 12. 曼珠沙華 (Manjushage); 13. とおせんぼう (Toosenbou); 14. 傀儡の心臓 (Kugutsu no shinzō); 15. 廃墟の国のアリス (Haikyo no kuni no Alice); 16. 生まれた意味などなかった。 (Umareta imi nado nakatta); 17. アートを科学する (Art wo Kagakusuru); 18. それは恋の終わり (Sore wa koi no owari); 19. 拝啓、桜舞い散るこの日に (Haikei, sakura maichiru kono hi ni); 20. あさきゆめみし (Asakiyumemishi)	2
5th	16 October 2019	神楽色アーティファクト (Kagura-iro Artifact)	A-Sketch	First limited-edition B	AZZS-91		2
5th	16 October 2019	神楽色アーティファクト (Kagura-iro Artifact)	A-Sketch	Normal Edition	AZCS-1082		2
6th	25 December 2024	世会色ユニバース (Sekaiiro Universe)	A-Sketch	Limited edition/ Type A	AZZS-152	34 Songs CD Disc 1: 1. [Killing time]; 2. 神様の遺伝子 (Kami-sama no Idenshi); 3. 悔やむと書いてミライ (Kuyamu to Kaite Mirai); 4. トロイア (Trojan); 5. オーダーメイド (Order-Made); 6. 成れの果てのグリフ (Nare no Hate no Grief); 7. 空腹 (Kuufuku); 8. カラスとうさぎ (Karasu to Usagi); 9. おとといきやがれ (Ototoi Kiyagare); 10. 禁じられた果実 (Kinjirareta Kajitsu); 11. クロスワードパズル (Crossword Puzzle); 12. 心恋花火 (Uragoi Hanabi); 13. ウィッチハント・アンドゥ (Witch-Hunt Undo); 14. エグゼキューション (Execution); 15. 最果てのユニバース (Saihate no Universe); 16. [Impermanence of all things]; 17. 栞 (Shiori); Disc 2: 1. 最終宣告 (Saishuu Senkoku); 2. ラットキング (Rat King); 3. アンダーコントロール (Under Control); 4. 携帯恋話 (Keitai Renwa); 5. バニーボイラー (Bunny Boiler); 6. 音楽を恨んでいる (Ongaku o Urandeiru); 7. 二千五百万分の一 (Nisengohyakumanbun no Ichi); 8. [Passphrase]; 9. 神様の言うとおり (Kami-sama no Iutoori); 10. 嘘ラック (Lielac); 11. 逃非行 (Touhikou); 12. 暗い微睡みの呼ぶほうへ (Kurai Madoromi no Yobu Hou e); 13. 失意のエチュード (Shitsui no Étude); 14. 一生不幸でかまわない (Isshou Fukou de Kamawanai); 15. 忘れていいよ (Wasurete Ii yo); 16. [Submerged city]; 17. ひともどき (Hitomodoki)	5
6th	25 December 2024	世会色ユニバース (Sekaiiro Universe)	A-Sketch	Limited edition/ Type B	AZZS-156		5
6th	25 December 2024	世会色ユニバース (Sekaiiro Universe)	A-Sketch	Standard Edition	AZCS-1127		5

==== Vocaloid original albums ====
#	Released date	Title	Label	List of recorded song
1st	27 April 2013	明鏡止水 (Meikyō shisui)	Mafumafu	10 Song CD: 1. ヤクビョウガミ (Yakubyougami); 2. グッドスリープコンソール (Good sleep console); 3. 仇返しシンドローム (Kyū-gaeshi syndrome); 4. 後書きの始まり、虚無の目次 (Atogaki no hajimari, kyomu no mokuji); 5. 緑青色の憂鬱 (Ryokushōiro no yūutsu); 6. かくしごと (Kakushi goto); 7. カラクリ遺伝子脳 (Karakuri Idenshi nō); 8. 夕暮れ蝉日記 (Yūgure semi nikki); 9. 明鏡止水 (Meikyō shisui); 10. 透明パレット (Tōmei palette)

=== Singles ===
	Released date	Title	Formats	Album	Billboard Japan Download songs
From Music label A-Sketch
1	1 July 2019	サクリファイス (Sacrifice)	Digital download	Kagura-iro Artifact	41
2	21 February 2020	それを愛と呼ぶだけ (Sore o ai to yobu dake)	Digital download	N/A	36
3	1 April 2020	最終宣告 (Saishū senkoku)	Digital download	Sekaiiro Universe	82
4	10 January 2021	ナイティナイト (Nighty night)	Digital download	N/A	N/A
5	10 January 2021	デジャヴ (Deja vu)	Digital download	N/A	N/A
6	10 January 2021	ノンタイトル (Non-title)	Digital download	N/A	N/A
7	10 January 2021	リア充になりたい (Rear jū ni naritai)	Digital download	N/A	N/A
8	10 January 2021	悔やむと書いてミライ (Kuyamu to kaite mirai)	Digital download	Sekaiiro Universe	N/A
9	10 January 2021	携帯恋話 (Keitai renwa)	Digital download	N/A	N/A
10	10 January 2021	アルターエゴ (Alter ego)	Digital download	N/A	N/A
11	10 January 2021	夜空のクレヨン (Yozora no Crayon)	Digital download	N/A	N/A
12	10 January 2021	赤い風船 (Akaifusen)	Digital download	N/A	N/A
13	10 January 2021	百鬼夜行 (Hyakkiyakō)	Digital download	N/A	N/A
14	10 January 2021	ひともどき (Hitomodoki)	Digital download	Sekaiiro Universe	N/A
15	10 January 2021	イカサマダンス (Ikasama Dance)	Digital download	N/A	N/A
16	10 January 2021	ユウレイ (Yūrei)	Digital download	N/A	92
17	10 January 2021	夜想と白昼夢 (Yoru sō to hakuchūmu)	Digital download	N/A	N/A
18	12 March 2021	片恋 (Katakoi)	Digital download	N/A	N/A
19	3 December 2021	ブレス (Breath)	Digital download	N/A	N/A
20	4 February 2022	二千五百万分の一 (Nisengo Hyaku man-bu No ichi)	Digital download	Sekaiiro Universe	N/A
21	18 February 2022	栞 (Shiori)	Digital download	Sekaiiro Universe	N/A
22	12 October 2022	失楽園 (Shitsurakuen)	Digital download	N/A	N/A
23	22 October 2022	青春切符 (Seishun Kippu)	Digital download	N/A	N/A
24	25 December 2023	君のオシゴト手伝います! (Kimi no oshigoto tetsudaimasu!, I'll support you with your fave!)	Digital download	Sekaiiro Universe	N/A
25	4 October 2024	オーダーメイド (Order-Made)	Digital download	Sekaiiro Universe	N/A
26	24 July 2025	死神様にお願い (Shinigami-sama ni onegai)	Digital download	N/A	N/A
27	29 December 2025	レッツゴー！まふまふ (Let's go! Mafumafu)	Digital download	N/A	N/A
28	29 December 2025	死んだらどこへ行くのかな (shindara dokone ikunokana)	Digital download	N/A	N/A
29	29 December 2025	どーでもいいよ (Do-demoiiyo)	Digital download	N/A	N/A

=== Other charted songs ===
Year	Title	Japan Hot 100 Peak position	Album
2019	女の子になりたい (Onnanoko ni naritai)	85	Kagura-iro Artifact
2021	タクト (Takt) by ryo (supercell) feat. mafumafu, gaku		

== Performances ==
=== Voice actor ===
- 2016 – Theater anime Sukininaru sono shunkan wo.~ Kokuhaku jikkō iinkai ~ (The moment love it Confession Executive Committee) role as School boy A
- 2017 – TV Anime – Atom: The Beginning Role as Student 2 (EP.4)

=== TV program ===
- 19 October 2019 – Hikikomori kara dōmu e netto jidai no senku-sha ma fuma fu on NHK

=== Internet TV ===
- 27 January 2018 – Wakeari veggie on AbemaTV Ultra games (Note: The cast changes with each broadcast, but it is credited as one of the main casts for each broadcast.)
- 19 December 2018 – Hikikomori demo maru maru ga shitai! (also known as Hikimaru) on Yahoo! JAPAN
