= Pokémon Journeys: The Series =

Twenty-third season of the Pokémon animated television series

- Season 23
- Pokémon Journeys: The Series poster
- No. of episodes: 48

Release
- Original network: TV Tokyo
- Original release: November 17, 2019 – December 4, 2020

Season chronology
- ← Previous; Ultra Legends Next → Master Journeys

Pokémon Journeys: The Series is the twenty-third season of the Pokémon anime series and the first and titular season of Pokémon Journeys: The Series, known in Japan as Pocket Monsters (ポケットモンスター, Poketto Monsutā). The season premiered in Japan on TV Tokyo from November 17, 2019, to December 4, 2020. On April 23, 2020, The Pokémon Company International announced that Netflix has secured the U.S. rights to release future seasons, starting with "Pokémon Journeys", episodes were released in quarterly groups of twelve. This season follows the adventures of Ash Ketchum and his new friend Goh as they travel across all eight regions of the Pokémon franchise, including the new Galar region from Pokémon Sword and Shield.

== Episode list ==
Jap. overall (Note: The English episode numbers are based on their first streaming in the United States on Netflix. Other English-speaking nations largely follow either this order or the Japanese order. Episodes released on Netflix in the U.S. are released on a quarterly basis while those on TV networks outside of the U.S. are aired on a weekly basis.)	Eng. overall	No. in season	English title Japanese title	Original release date	English release date
1088	1081	1	"Enter Pikachu!" (Pikachu is Born!); Transliteration: "Pikachū tanjō!" (Japanese: ピカチュウ誕生！)	November 17, 2019	June 12, 2020
In this episode reveals Ash's Pikachu's backstory as a Pichu, his being cared for by a Kangaskhan after falling off a cliff, and the events leading Pichu to his evolution into a Pikachu and eventually meeting Ash for first time are revealed.: Note: In this episode, Hana Takeda voices 6-year-old Ash Ketchum, Kei Shindō voices 6-year-old Goh, and Ikue Ōtani voices Pichu. In the English dub, they are voiced by the same actors that voice their more grown-up counterparts aided by some technical tweaking.
1089	1082	2	"Legend? Go! Friends? Go!" (Satoshi and Gō, Let's Go by Lugia!); Transliteration: "Satoshi to Gō, Rugia de Gō!" (Japanese: サトシとゴウ、ルギアでゴー！)	November 24, 2019	June 12, 2020
After returning from Alola region, Ash, his mother Delia, Mr. Mime, and Professor Oak travel to Vermilion City to attend the opening of Professor Cerise's new research lab. Cerise wants the now 10-year-old Goh to choose his first Pokémon from among the Kanto starters, but he refuses because he wants to choose Mew instead. The sudden appearance of Legendary Pokémon Lugia causes Ash and Goh to meet and both of them to go on the ride of a lifetime to learn more about Lugia.
1090	1083	3	"Ivysaur's Mysterious Tower!" (Fushigisō, Isn't it Mysterious?); Transliteration: "Fushigisōtte Fushigidane?" (Japanese: フシギソウってフシギだね？)	December 1, 2019	June 12, 2020
A bunch of Ivysaur are causing chaos throughout Vermilion City, and Professor Cerise sends Ash and Goh to investigate. While learning the cause of the trouble, they not only learn more about each other but also clash with Team Rocket, who are now using Pokéballs supplied by Giovanni via a Pelipper that arrives whenever they call it. With the help of the Ivysaur, Pikachu defeats Team Rocket and the Ivysaur evolve into Venusaur.
1091	1084	4	"Settling the Scorbunny!" (Let's Go to the Galar Region! An Encounter with Hibanny!!); Transliteration: "Ikuze Gararu Chihō! Hibanī Tono Deai!!" (Japanese: 行くぜガラル地方！ヒバニーとの出会い！！)	December 8, 2019	June 12, 2020
Ash and Goh travel to the Galar region to investigate reports that Pokémon are growing giant-sized. While waiting for their train to the Wild Area, they meet up with a trio of food-thieving Nickit, led by a mischievous Scorbunny that seems to connect with Goh.
1092	1085	5	"Mind-Boggling Dynamax!" (Kabigon Became Gigantic!? The Mystery of Daimax!!); Transliteration: "Kabigon Kyodai ka!? Daimakkusu no Nazo!!" (Japanese: カビゴン巨大化！？ダイマックスの謎！！)	December 15, 2019	June 12, 2020
Ash and Goh continue their investigation in Galar's Wild Area, encountering a Snorlax affected by the mysterious phenomenon, now called "Dynamax". Meanwhile, the Scorbunny from the previous episode has been following them.
1093	1086	6	"Working My Way Back to Mew!" (Catch a Lot of Pokémon! The Path to Mew!!); Transliteration: "Pokémon Tairyō Getto Daze! Myū e no Michi!!" (Japanese: ポケモン大量ゲットだぜ！ミュウへの道！！)	December 22, 2019	June 12, 2020
Goh and Scorbunny have become partners, but Goh is still determined to catch Mew someday. However, he finds that catching certain Pokémon is not as easy as he thinks.
1094	1087	7	"Serving Up the Flute Cup!" (The Hoenn Region, Site of Fierce Fights! The Battle Frontier Challenge!!); Transliteration: "Gekitō no Hōen Chihō! Chōsen Batoru Furontia!!" (Japanese: 激闘のホウエン地方！挑戦バトルフロンティア！！)	December 29, 2019	June 12, 2020
Hearing about the Battle Frontier Flute Cup held in the Hoenn region, Ash immediately signs both himself and Goh up. Goh's battling inexperience gets him knocked out in the first round, but Ash, Pikachu, and Mr. Mime show him that battling can be fun.
1095	1088	8	"The Sinnoh Iceberg Race!" (Don't Lose, Pochama! The Drift Ice Race in the Sinnoh Region!!); Transliteration: "Makeruna Potchama! Shin'ō Chihō no Ryūhyō Rēsu!!" (Japanese: 負けるなポッチャマ！シンオウ地方の流氷レース！！)	January 12, 2020	June 12, 2020
Ash and Goh meet a Piplup from the Sinnoh region that has run (actually swam) away from its owner Lauren. Travelling to Sinnoh to return it, they learn that Piplup ran away because of its jealousy about Lauren's Croagunk, who is competing with Piplup for her attention. The two Pokémon decide to settle their quarrel by competing in the Pokémon Iceberg Race, which Ash and Goh decide to enter as well, while Team Rocket plans to sabotage the race by capturing all the Pokémon that have entered.
1096	1089	9	"Finding a Legend!" (The Promise We Made that Day! The Houou Legend of the Johto Region!!); Transliteration: "Ano Hi no Chikai! Jōto Chihō no Hōō Densetsu!!" (Japanese: あの日の誓い！ジョウト地方のホウオウ伝説！！)	January 19, 2020	June 12, 2020
Reports from the Johto region of sightings of Ho-Oh, the Legendary Pokémon that Ash and Pikachu saw long ago, send Ash and Goh to Johto in the hope of seeing it. At an ancient bell tower, they meet a boy who also wants to see Ho-Oh and his grandfather who has lost his belief in the Legendary Pokémon.
1097	1090	10	"A Test in Paradise!" (The Kairyu Paradise and Hakuryu's Ordeal!); Transliteration: "Kairyū no Rakuen, Hakuryū no Shiren!" (Japanese: カイリューの楽園、ハクリューの試練！)	January 26, 2020	June 12, 2020
Acting on reports about Dragonite, Ash and Goh begin a search for a mysterious island that may be the Dragonite habitat. To get there, Goh catches a Dewgong to use as a Ride Pokémon, but its chasing a female Dewgong it has fallen in love with sends them headlong into a storm; fortunately, they are rescued by Dragonite who bring them to their island. While learning about the Dratini, Dragonair, and Dragonite living there, Ash and Pikachu help a Dragonair who's having trouble learning how to fly. Following an attack from Team Rocket, the Dragonair evolves into Dragonite and allows Ash to catch it.
1098	1091	11	"Best Friend... Worst Nightmare!" (Koharu, Wanpachi, and Sometimes Gangar Too); Transliteration: "Koharu to Wanpachi to, Tokidoki, Gengā" (Japanese: コハルとワンパチと、時々、ゲンガー)	February 2, 2020	June 12, 2020
A Gengar is revealed to be responsible for poltergeist activity at the Cerise Institute, and Ash and Goh race to catch it. Meanwhile, Chloe is unsure what her dream for the future is and whether or not she even likes Pokémon, but returning to the lab she becomes caught up in the battle between Ash and Goh against Gengar.
1099	1092	12	"Flash of the Titans!" (Daimax Battle! Dande, The Greatest of Them All!!); Transliteration: "Daimakkusu Batoru! Saikyō Ōja Dande!!" (Japanese: ダイマックスバトル！最強王者ダンデ！！)	February 9, 2020	June 12, 2020
Professor Cerise gives Ash and Goh tickets to the World Coronation Series, a competition to officially decide the strongest Pokémon Trainer in the world. The Masters Eight Tournament Finals of the previous season of the World Coronation Series are is being held in Wyndon (a city in the Galar region). Ash and Goh discover that Dynamax can be controlled during the final battle between Kanto Elite Four member Lance and Galar League Champion Leon, in which Leon's Charizard defeats Lance's Gyarados, becoming Leon the World Coronation Series Champion and giving the title of Monarch. Meanwhile, Team Rocket attempts to capture a Drednaw by battling it with a Bellsprout, but Drednaw then goes into Gigantamax form and goes on a rampage.
1100	1093	13	"The Climb to Be the Very Best!" (Satoshi vs. Dande! The Road to the Strongest!!); Transliteration: "Satoshi tai Dande! Saikyō e no Michi!!" (Japanese: サトシ対ダンデ！最強への道！！)	February 16, 2020	September 11, 2020
While the Gigantamax Drednaw chases Team Rocket, Ash and Goh lure it to them and battle with Pikachu and Scorbunny. When a strike from the Gigantamax Drednaw cracks open the ground and releases energy, Pikachu becomes a Gigantamax form without the use of a Dynamax Band. With help from Leon, Ash and Gigantamax Pikachu defeat Gigantamax Drednaw, with both Pokémon returning to normal after the battle. Ash asks to have an unofficial battle with Leon, who later sneaks up on Ash and Goh and agrees to the former's request. Though Ash battles hard and well with the new Dynamax Band gifted by Leon, the Galar League Champion wins, though the two promise to have an official battle in the next World Coronation Series season.
1101	1094	14	"Raid Battle in the Ruins!" (First in the Unova Region! The Raid Battle at the Ruins!!); Transliteration: "Hatsu Isshu Chihō! Iseki de Reidobatoru!!" (Japanese: 初イッシュ地方！遺跡でレイドバトル！！)	February 23, 2020	September 11, 2020
Ash and Goh travel to the Unova region to explore the Ruins of the Titan, located in the middle of the Desert Resort. Due to the hot sand making walking difficult, Pokémon Ranger Keira suggests that they use their Pokémon to sled across. Reaching the ruin, Ash, Goh, and Keira meet the Group Leader and explore the ruins, but find that the path to face the Ancient Titan, a giant Golurk, is set with deadly traps, leading up to a battle.
1102	1095	15	"A Snow Day for Searching!" (On a Snowy Day, Where Is Karakara's Bone?); Transliteration: "Yuki no Hi, Karakara no Hone wa Doko?" (Japanese: 雪の日、カラカラのホネはどこ？)	March 1, 2020	September 11, 2020
With the systems down at the Cerise Institute due to a major snowfall, Goh decides to go home to visit his family. While waiting for his parents to arrive, he and Scorbunny spot a Cubone being bullied by a gang of Mankeys. When the Mankeys steal Cubone's bone, Goh, Scorbunny, and some of his Pokémon decide to help Cubone get its precious bone back. Meanwhile, because Goh had left behind his present to his parents, Ash and Pikachu come looking for him, and after learning what happened volunteer to help.
1103	1096	16	"A Chilling Curse!" (Cursed Satoshi...!); Transliteration: "Norowareta Satoshi...!" (Japanese: 呪われたサトシ...！)	March 8, 2020	September 11, 2020
The Gengar that "haunted" the Cerise lab is back, and it is as mischievous as ever. Ash and Goh resume their race to catch it, but it gets away. Goh starts insinuating that Gengar might be back to curse Ash and all of a sudden, strange incidents start happening to Ash. Later, he literally runs into a Trainer whom Gengar (who's been hiding in Ash's shadow) recognizes as its former Trainer who had abandoned it three years ago. Ash intervenes when the enraged Gengar attacks its former Trainer, and Team Rocket (who've been watching from the sidelines) decides that they want Gengar for themselves. Ash and Gengar team up to defeat Team Rocket, and Gengar decides to allow Ash to catch it.
1104	1097	17	"Kicking It From Here Into Tomorrow!" (Hibanny, Use Your Flaming Kick! Face Tomorrow!!); Transliteration: "Hibanī, Honō no Kikku! Asunimukatte!!" (Japanese: ヒバニー、炎のキック！明日に向かって！！)	March 15, 2020	September 11, 2020
While training with Ash and Pikachu, Scorbunny is teased by Goh's Darmanitan into using a Fire-type move, but things do not go well. Scorbunny is frustrated, and when Goh seems unsympathetic Scorbunny runs away. It manages to learn Ember, but Goh is too interested in catching Pokémon to notice. Chasing after a Pelipper, Goh, and Scorbunny run into Team Rocket, who attacks them using a Poliwrath and a Chewtle. Scorbunny is quickly defeated when its Sparks move fails again, and Ash and Pikachu join in, with Pikachu "blasting off" Team Rocket. When Goh again seems unsympathetic, Scorbunny runs away again and again runs into Team Rocket, who battles it again. This time, Goh and Scorbunny work as a team, causing Scorbunny to evolve into Raboot, whose new Ember defeats Team Rocket. However, in the battle's aftermath, the relationship between Goh and the former Scorbunny may never be the same.
1105	1098	18	"Destination: Coronation!" (Satoshi Participates! The Pokémon World Championships!!); Transliteration: "Satoshi Sansen! Pokémon Wārudo Chanpionshippusu! !" (Japanese: サトシ参戦！ポケモンワールドチャンピオンシップス！！)	March 22, 2020	September 11, 2020
In order to battle Leon again, Ash officially enters the new season of the World Coronation Series, though he must win his way up the ranks to the Master Class and battle Leon. Ash arrives at the Vermillion City Gym to face the Gym Leader Lt. Surge. However, with Surge away, the Gym is now being run by Visquez, whom becomes Ash's first World Coronation Series' Normal Class opponent. Their battle is a two-on-two match, with Ash's Pikachu and Gengar facing Visquez's Raichu and Electrode. Ash emerges victorious, rising to 3,763 in the WCS.
1106	1099	19	"A Talent for Imitation!" (I Am Metamon!); Transliteration: "Watashi wa Metamon!" (Japanese: ワタシはメタモン！)	March 29, 2020	September 11, 2020
Jessie still has dreams of being an actress, so she and Team Rocket try to sneak into a studio shooting a film in which one of the actors is a Ditto that cannot transform properly. Terrified by the film's dictatorial director, Ditto runs away by secretly hiding in Jessie's bag. When Team Rocket finds it after returning to their hideout, Jessie decides to train it to transform properly. Meanwhile, Ash and Goh are searching for the missing Ditto.
1107	1100	20	"Dreams Are Made of These!" (Go Towards Your Dream! Satoshi and Go!!); Transliteration: "Yume e Mukatte Gō! Satoshi to Gō!!" (Japanese: 夢へ向かってゴー！サトシとゴウ！！)	April 5, 2020	September 11, 2020
During Pokémon Orientation Day at the Cerise Institute, the six visiting children are split into three teams: Team Blue escorted by Ash and Pikachu; Team Red by Goh, Raboot and Chloe; Team Yellow by Professor Cerise and Chloe's Yamper, to explore a section of the city and learn about the Pokémon they meet. Naturally, the kids are in for different but interesting experiences: Ash and Pikachu show their kids Pokémon-battling (getting involved in a World Coronation Series ranking match along the way), and Goh goes on a Pokémon-catching spree with his duo. Trouble strikes when Team Rocket tries to steal Pikachu, Raboot, and Yamper by using a fake Lugia.
1108	1101	21	"Caring for a Mystery!" (Convey the Wave Guidance! Satoshi and the Mysterious Egg!!); Transliteration: "Todoke-ha Shirube! Satoshi to Fushigina Tamago! !" (Japanese: とどけ波導！サトシと不思議なタマゴ！！)	April 12, 2020	September 11, 2020
While out searching for Pokémon eggs, Ash and Goh encounter Hayden, a Trainer who challenges Ash to a World Coronation Series ranking match, but his Tauros is defeated by Pikachu. At the Vermillion City Pokémon Center, while Pikachu is being treated, a Pokémon egg from the Sinnoh Region that hasn't been willing to hatch yet reacts to Ash, and Nurse Joy entrusts the egg to him. That night at the Cerise Institute, the egg hatches to reveal a Riolu, who runs away and starts attacking wild Pokémon indiscriminately, including an Onix that is too strong for Riolu. Fortunately, Ash and Pikachu arrive to assist, the resulting battle leaving Riolu as the newest addition to Ash's team.
1109	1102	22	"Goodbye, Friend!" (Goodbye, Rabbifoot!); Transliteration: "Sayonara, Rabbifuto!" (Japanese: さよなら、ラビフット！)	April 19, 2020	September 11, 2020
Ash and Goh have gone to the Hoenn Region to investigate the phenomenon that causes Beautifly to migrate, but the rift between Raboot and Goh seems to be getting worse and worse than ever to the point where Raboot is refusing to listen to Goh. While they're all staying at the Pokémon Center, Raboot keeps sneaking out at night. Ash, Pikachu, and Goh follow him to an underground Pokémon Dance Club where Raboot seems to be quite the dance star and appears quite happy. Believing that Raboot would be better off without him, Goh decides to release Raboot, but Raboot decides to stay with its Trainer, much to Goh's delight.
1110	1103	23	"Panic in the Park!" (A Massive Panic! Sakuragi Park!); Transliteration: "Dai Panikku! Sakuragi Pāku!" (Japanese: 大パニック！サクラギパーク！！)	June 7, 2020 (Note: This episode was originally scheduled to air on April 26, 2020, and the six following were to air in the subsequent weeks but did not due to the production shutdown caused by the COVID-19 pandemic in Japan.)	September 11, 2020
All the food in the Cerise Park has disappeared, and all the Pokémon there are starting to fight out of hunger. Ash and Goh decide to stake out the park overnight to catch the culprit.
1111	1104	24	"A Little Rocket R&R!" (Take a Break! Rocket-dan!!); Transliteration: "Yasume! Roketto-dan!!" (Japanese: 休め！ロケット団！！)	June 14, 2020	September 11, 2020
Team Rocket receives orders from Giovanni to take a vacation, an order which apparently applies to all Team Rocket members, but while they are taking things easy in the Sinnoh Region Resort Area, Matori and her Elite Team swoop in and start snatching up Pokémon. Now Jessie, James, Meowth, and Wobbuffet have to work with Ash and Goh, who are also in Sinnoh, to stop Matori without anyone finding out who they are or face punishment for violating their orders from HQ.
1112	1105	25	"A Festival Reunion!" (A Battle Festival Exploding With Life! VS Mega Lucario!!); Transliteration: "Inochi Bakuhatsu Batoru Fesu! Buiesu Mega Rukario!!" (Japanese: 命爆発バトルフェス！VSメガルカリオ！！)	June 21, 2020	December 4, 2020
Ash returns to the Kalos region with Goh to compete in the Battle Festival, in which a lot of the participants are also competing in the World Coronation Series. During the competition, while Goh, as usual, is out catching new Pokémon. In a World Coronation Series Ranking Match, Ash comes face to face with an old opponent and friend: Gym Leader Korrina and her Lucario! It is a two-on-two battle, with Ash's Gengar and Dragonite vs. Korrina's Mienshao and Lucario! Facing off against Korrina's Mega Lucario yet again, Ash emerges victorious and advances to the Great Class.
1113	1106	26	"Splash, Dash, and Smash for the Crown!" (Jump! Koiking); Transliteration: "Hanero! Koikingu" (Japanese: はねろ！コイキング)	June 28, 2020	December 4, 2020
1113	1106	26	"Slowking's Crowning!" (Put it On! Yadoking); Transliteration: "Kabure! Yadoking" (Japanese: かぶれ！ヤドキング)	June 28, 2020	December 4, 2020
"Splash, Dash, and Smash for the Crown!": Goh decides to enter his new Magikarp in a Magikarp High Jump Tournament, but his Magikarp has gotten too big and fat to jump, so he decides to train it using training tapes by Pokémon World High Jump Champion Kasuking...plus a special secret technique of his own. "Slowking's Crowning!": Ash and Goh travel to an island habitat for Slowpoke, and when an udon-eating Slowking appears, Ash shares some of his ramen with it. The Slowking likes it so much it exchanges its Shellder for the ramen, but when the Shellder latches onto Ash's head he becomes Ash-king with the brainwashed!: Note: In this episode, Kasukarp is voiced by comedian Toshiaki Kasuga. This episode also consists of two 11-minute stories rather than a full-length story.
1114	1107	27	"Toughing It Out!" (Legends of Heroes! Dande's Greatest Battle!!); Transliteration: "Hideo Densetsu! Dande Saikyō Batoru!!" (Japanese: 英雄伝説！ダンデ最強バトル！！)	July 5, 2020	December 4, 2020
Accompanied by Pikachu, Raboot, Riolu and Goh's Farfetch'd, Ash and Goh return to the Galar Region to see a World Coronation Series Master Class Match between Leon and his rival: Hammerlocke Gym Leader and Dragon-type user Raihan. Both trainers duke it out using Gigantamax, but Leon emerges victorious. Later, Ash and Goh meet a young woman named Sonia, an old friend of Leon, who tells them something disturbing about the power behind Dynamax and Gigantamax, and Riolu gets its first real chance to battle when they encounter a tough Galarian Farfetch'd.
1115	1108	28	"Sobbing Sobble!" (Sobbing Messon); Transliteration: "Mesomeso Messon" (Japanese: めそめそメッソン)	July 12, 2020	December 4, 2020
While still in the Galar region, Ash and Goh come across a timid Sobble that not only will not stop crying, but whose crying causes other people to cry as well. Goh manages to catch it, but when he uses it to try and catch a Silicobra, it runs away. Later, it encounters Team Rocket, who, after having a bad time with a hungry Morpeko, decides to use it as bait to catch Pikachu but instead get caught up in the waterworks, forcing Ash and Goh to battle them to free Sobble.
1116	1109	29	"There's a New Kid in Town!" (Electrifying Jealousy! Wanpachi's Feelings); Transliteration: "Pachipachi Yaki Mochi! Wanpachi no Kimochi" (Japanese: パチパチやきもち！ワンパチのきもち)	July 19, 2020	December 4, 2020
Yamper finds an injured Pidove and brings it to the Cerise house, and the Cerise family decides to take care of it. The problem is, as time goes on Pidove becomes firmly (and physically) attached to Yamper, but when Yamper becomes jealous of the growing attachment between Pidove and Chloe, Chloe needs to be reminded of her own history with Yamper.
1117	1110	30	"Betrayed, Bothered, and Beleaguered!" (The Reluctant Pikachu and the Exasperated Barrierd); Transliteration: "Iyaiya Pikachū, Yareyare Bariyādo" (Japanese: いやいやピカチュウ、やれやれバリヤード)	July 26, 2020	December 4, 2020
When Ash seems fixated on training Riolu, Pikachu, feeling left out and jealous with betrayal, bonds with Ash's mother Delia and decides to run away back to Pallet Town to join her. Mr. Mine chases after him, but Pikachu will not listen, so he determinedly follows him. This begins a journey in which not only are memories revived and re-experienced, but also both old and new bonds are formed and re-forged.
1118	1111	31	"The Cuteness Quotient!" (Hinbass's Beautiful Scale); Transliteration: "Hinbasu no Kireina Uroko" (Japanese: ヒンバスのきれいなウロコ)	August 2, 2020	December 4, 2020
Parker's friend Jinny is upset because everyone keeps telling her that her Pokémon, a Feebas (said to be the shabbiest Pokémon in the world) is not cute. However, Jinny and Feebas aim to win the Friendship Contest. With Chloe, Parker, Ash, and Goh's encouragement, they begin training for the contest, but it may not be so easy, especially since Jinny needs to first learn how to swim and Team Rocket, hearing of the contest, decides to crash it to steal all the competing Pokémon.
1119	1112	32	"Time After Time!" (Celebi: A Timeless Promise); Transliteration: "Serebī Toki o Koeta Yakusoku" (Japanese: セレビィ 時を超えた約束)	August 9, 2020	December 4, 2020
Goh has a flashback about three years ago, where the 7-year-old Goh met a 7-year-old boy named Horace on a family trip to Azalea Town in the Johto region. Horace was searching for the Mythical Pokémon Celebi and the two decided to search for it together, but Celebi was hard to find. The two of them promised to meet up again the next day to continue their search, but Horace never showed up, causing the promises get broken. After Goh's flashback ends, Goh returns to Azalea Town and ends up encountering the ghosts of his past.: Note: Ash and Pikachu are absent from this episode.
1120	1113	33	"Trade, Borrow, and Steal!" (Would You Like To Do a Pokémon Trade?); Transliteration: "Pokemon Kōkan Shimasenka?" (Japanese: ポケモン交換しませんか？)	August 16, 2020	December 4, 2020
While attending the Pokémon Exchange Event in Vermillion City Ash and Goh meet bug-type enthusiast and self-proclaimed "Bug Pokémon Queen of the Sinnoh Region" Kriketina Kylie, who is looking to collect Kanto Bug-type Pokémon. Kricketina wants to trade her Heracross for Goh's Pinsir, but Goh cannot bring himself to do it. So, he and Ash try to help her catch a wild Pinsir using Kricketina's special food bait, with interesting results courtesy of Team Rocket (who happen to be starving, thanks to Morpeko) and Kricketina's Heracross. In addition, Ash battles Kylie in a Great Class match, resulting in another win and rank increase for Ash.
1121	1114	34	"Solitary and Menacing!" (The Solitary Fighter Saito! The Threatening Otosupus!!); Transliteration: "Kokō no Tōshi Saitō！Otosupasu no Kyōi! !" (Japanese: 孤高の闘士サイトウ！オトスパスの脅威！！)	August 23, 2020	December 4, 2020
Ash and Goh are visiting the Fighting Dojo in Saffron City, where the Karate Master has just suffered a rough defeat at the hands of Bea, a Fighting-type Gym Leader from the Galar region. Eager to raise his World Coronation Series ranking and continue his winning streak, Ash challenges Bea to an official battle. Ash's Riolu and Farfetch'd have trained hard, but prove no match at all for Bea's Hawlucha and Grapploct, resulting in a humiliating defeat and Ash's first loss in the World Coronation Series.
1122	1115	35	"Gotta Catch a What?!" (Pikachu, I'll Get You!!); Transliteration: "Pikachu, Getto Daze!!" (Japanese: ピカチュウ、ゲットだぜ！！)	August 30, 2020	December 4, 2020
Having caught lots of Pokémon so far, Goh admires the close bond between Ash and Pikachu, so decides to catch a Pikachu of his own. Coincidentally, Cerise wants Ash and Goh to research a Pikachu outbreak. When they arrive, Goh catches a female Pikachu, whose friends are digging Thunder Stones out of the nearby rocks so they can evolve into Raichu. But Team Rocket arrives, and they manage to round up not just the wild Pikachu, but Ash's Pikachu, too. But Goh's Pikachu knows just what to do to send Team Rocket blasting off.
1123	1116	36	"Making Battles in the Sand!" (Satoshi and Go, Crawl Up From the Sand Hell!); Transliteration: "Satoshi to Gō, Suna Jigoku Kara Hai Agare" (Japanese: サトシとゴウ、砂地獄から這い上がれ！)	September 6, 2020	December 4, 2020
As a result of his battle with Bea, Ash's confidence has been shaken, sending him into a 3-loss losing streak and dropping him down from the Great Class back into the Normal Class in the World Coronation Series. Meanwhile, a mysterious whirling sandstorm has appeared in Mauville City, drawing people in with a strange singing noise. Ash and Goh investigate and find that the storm is being caused by a powerful Flygon. Just when it seems Ash may be defeated, Goh comes up with a brilliant new strategy.
1124	1117	37	"That New Old Gang of Mine!" (I'm Back! Nice to Meet You, Alola!); Transliteration: "Tadaima！ Hajimemashite, Arōra！" (Japanese: ただいま！はじめましてアローラ！)	September 13, 2020	March 5, 2021
After Goh's Exeggcute is evolved into an Exeggutor, Ash tells him about Alolan Exeggutor and Goh becomes fired up with the idea of catching one. Ash and Goh travel to the Alola region where Ash is reunited with his Alolan Pokémon and his old friends, Pokémon, and his mentor Professor Kukui (as well the new addition to the Kukui family). At the party Ash's friends are throwing for him, Kiawe challenges Goh to a battle to see if Goh is a fitting rival for Ash. It is Goh's Raboot against Kiawe's Turtonator in a battle in which Goh is introduced to Z-moves, with a surprise ending.
1125	1118	38	"Restore and Renew!" (Miracle Restoration, the Fossil Pokémon!); Transliteration: "Kiseki no Fukugen, Kaseki no Pokemon!" (Japanese: 奇跡の復元、化石のポケモン！)	September 20, 2020	March 5, 2021
Chloe has decided on her school research project: Pokémon fossils. Ash and Goh accompany her to an excavation site, with Goh becoming excited at the thought of possibly catching a Fossil-type Pokémon, but Team Rocket follows them with the same idea in mind. Goh finds a Secret Amber, which that night (after Team Rocket breaks into the Restoration Room and meddles with the machinery) is revived into an Aerodactyl, which escapes! But while Goh is determined to catch the new Aerodactyl, Ash must battle Team Rocket on his own.
1126	1119	39	"Octo-Gridlock at the Gym!" (Satoshi Vs Saito! Conquer the Octopus Hold!!); Transliteration: "Satoshi tai Saitō! Kōryaku Tako ga Tame!!" (Japanese: サトシ対サイトウ！攻略たこがため！！)	September 27, 2020	March 5, 2021
After having battled his way back into the Great Class and hearing that Bea is in the Johto Region, Ash heads out to challenge her once again. At the Cianwood City Gym, headed by Ash's former opponent Gym Leader Chuck, Ash faces Bea, with Pikachu and Riolu battling Bea's Grapploct and Hitmontop to avenge their previous defeat. Pikachu takes down Hitmontop but is brutally defeated by Grapploct. Riolu faces off against Grapploct next, and thanks to a surprising strategy from Ash, manages to overcome Grapploct's signature Octolock move. However, the battle results in a draw, leaving no change in the rankings for either trainer. Ash and Bea vow to rematch each other again in the Ultra Class.
1127	1120	40	"A Crackling Raid Battle!" (VS Thunder! A Legendary Raid Battle!!); Transliteration: "Buiesu Sandā! Densetsu Reido Batoru!!" (Japanese: VSサンダー！伝説レイドバトル！！)	October 9, 2020	March 5, 2021
Something is interfering with and draining the electrical power from Vermillion City. Thinking the cause may be the Legendary Pokémon Zapdos, Professor Cerise sends Ash and Goh to investigate, with both boys wanting to catch Zapdos for themselves. Tracking Zapdos to the Kanto Power Plant, a major Raid Battle begins, with Ash and Goh joined by the most unexpected of allies: Team Rocket, who also want Zapdos for themselves. They manage to work together for a while, but when it looks like Zapdos is escaping, Team Rocket turns on Ash, who orders Goh to go after Zapdos while he and Pikachu deal with Team Rocket. Goh calls on his Flygon to help Raboot, but he fails to catch Zapdos, who uses its accumulated power to recharge all the area's Electric Pokémon, including Pikachu.
1128	1121	41	"Pikachu Translation Check..." (The Great Pikachu Dubbing Operation!); Transliteration: "Pikachū Atereko Dai Sakusen!" (Japanese: ピカチュウ アテレコ大作戦！)	October 16, 2020	March 5, 2021
1128	1121	41	"Up To Your Neck!" (Half, Numacraw.); Transliteration: "Hanbun, Numakurō." (Japanese: 半分、ヌマクロー。)	October 16, 2020	March 5, 2021
"Pikachu Translation Check...": Meowth has caught a bad cold, and the rest of Team Rocket are not providing much comfort. Meowth realizes just what it is that Team Rocket is lacking but falls asleep before he can tell the rest. After seeing some drone footage of Pikachu in action, Jessie and James decide to make a serious study of Pikachu in order to finally catch him. The trouble is, Jessie's plan to dub over Pikachu in order to understand his speech may not be as brilliant as she thinks since neither Team Rocket human really understands Pikachu. "Up To Your Neck!": Ash, Goh, and their Pokémon are enjoying the nice weather when they come across a Marshtomp half-buried inside a field of completely parched earth. The ground is too hard for them to dig Marshtomp out, and Goh's various plans to free it, such as by catching it or using Sobble's Water Gun move, fail completely. As Ash and Goh try to figure out a way to get water to free the Marshtomp, a Ludicolo Runpappa might just provide the solution...if they can get it to understand what they need.
1129	1122	42	"Sword and Shield, Slumbering Weald!" (Sword & Shield I - "Slumbering Forest"); Transliteration: "Sōdo Ando Shīrudo I "Madoromi no Mori"" (Japanese: ソード&シールドI 「まどろみの森」)	October 23, 2020	March 5, 2021
After Ash's Dynamax Band suddenly starts to glow on its own, he and Goh decide to visit the Galar region and see Professor Magnolia, the leading authority on Dynamax research, but on their way there their train is stopped by a mysterious fog. Leaving the train to chase after a Bunnelby, they get separated in a forest shrouded in thick mist after Goh pursues the Bunnelby on his own. Trying to find each other, they encounter two mysterious Pokémon. Meanwhile, the Galar region is experiencing a phenomenon where Pokémon are dynamaxing in places where it is normally impossible for them to do so and going on rampages, leaving Ash and Leon to stop the crisis.
1130	1123	43	"Sword and Shield: The Darkest Day!" (Sword & Shield II - "Black Night"); Transliteration: "Sōdo Ando Shīrudo II "Burakku Naito"" (Japanese: ソード&シールドII 「ブラックナイト」)	October 30, 2020	March 5, 2021
Goh and Sonia travel to Turffield to investigate some ruins that may hold a clue to the secret of Dynamax and then to Professor Magnolia's laboratory to consult with her, where Goh receives his own Dynamax Band. Ash and Leon continue battling Dynamax Pokémon, meeting Rose, Galar League Chairman and Leon's largest sponsor. Rose tries to offer specialized support to Ash in exchange for aid in the former's personal projects, but Ash declines, wanting to follow his own dream of becoming a Pokémon Master (enraging Rose's assistant Oleana). The next day while Sonia and Goh are visiting a mural at Stow-on-Side, Oleana's henchman, who's been tailing them, tries to kidnap them on Oleana's orders, but a Dynamax battle between Raboot and the henchman's Garbodor reveals some startling new evidence about the legend of Galar.
1131	1124	44	"Sword and Shield: "From Here to Eternatus!"" (Sword & Shield III - "Mugendaina"); Transliteration: "Sōdo Ando Shīrudo III "Mugendaina"" (Japanese: ソード&シールドIII 「ムゲンダイナ」)	November 6, 2020	March 5, 2021
Dynamax Raboot defeats Oleana's henchman's Gigantamax Garbodor, sending the henchman fleeing. The revealed statues are images of Zacian and Zamazenta holding the Sword and Shield, shining new light on Galar's history. Leon sees the Legendary Pokémon Eternatus break free from Rose's Energy Plant core, unleashing the Darkest Day catastrophe. Ash races to stop it, while Goh returns to Slumbering Weald with Sonia where they not only meet Zacian and Zamamenta, but also uncover the artifacts which may save the world. At the Energy Plant, Rose reveals his true nature and intentions to Ash and Leon. Eternatus breaks free and escapes; while Leon goes after it, Ash prepares to battle Rose's Copperajah and Ferrothorn with Pikachu and Riolu. When Goh arrives, he and Raboot face off against Oleana and her Milotic.
1132	1125	45	"Sword and Shield... The Legends Awaken!" (Sword & Shield IV - "The Ultimate Sword and Shield"); Transliteration: "Sōdo Ando Shīrudo IV "Saikyō no Ken to Tate"" (Japanese: ソード&シールドIV 「最強の剣と盾」)	November 13, 2020	March 5, 2021
Ash, Goh, and Leon's respective battles continue. During the battles, Riolu evolves into Lucario, Raboot evolves into Cinderace, and both Rose and Oleana are defeated. After Leon fails to capture Eternatus, it takes on its Eternamax form and Leon and Charizard are injured. Ash and Goh take up the Sword and Shield to battle Eternamax Eternatus, summoning Zacian and Zamazenta to help them and their Pokémon defeat Eternatus. Ash and Goh use Goh's Poké Ball to catch Eternatus, ending the Darkest Day threat and return the Sword and Shield to Slumbering Weald. Sonia is officially appointed a Pokémon Professor by her grandmother, while Rose and Oleana's whereabouts are hidden.
1133	1126	46	"Getting More Than You Battled For!" (Battle & Get! The Revival of Mewtwo); Transliteration: "Batoru Ando Getto! Myūtsū no Fukkatsu" (Japanese: バトル&ゲット！ミュウツーの復活)	November 20, 2020	March 5, 2021
Psychic energy thought to belong to Mew has been detected on Cero Island, and Ash and Goh leave immediately, hoping to find Mew. Arriving at the island, they meet up with lots of different Pokémon (many of which Goh immediately catches) and encounter the Legendary Pokémon Mewtwo. Goh announces his determination to catch Mew, and when Ash asks to battle Mewtwo, it agrees to face them both at the same time. Aided by Pikachu, Lucario, and Cinderace, Ash and Goh begin their toughest battle yet with their dreams on the line.
1134	1127	47	"Crowning the Chow Crusher!" (Pokémon Champion! Gluttony King Playoff!!); Transliteration: "Pokemon Chanpion! Ōgui-ō Kettei-sen!!" (Japanese: ポケモンチャンピオン！大食い王決定戦！！)	November 27, 2020	March 5, 2021
Ash and Goh decide to compete in Vermillion City's Eating Contest, Ash with his Dragonite and Goh with his Skwovet, but Team Rocket also joins in with their Morpeko. Ash and Dragonite are eliminated in the first round and both Skwovet and Morpeko move on, but before the second round, Team Rocket's cheating eliminates quite a few contestants. Skwovet and Morpeko make it to the finals and Team Rocket are confident of success, but then discover that Morpeko is totally full while Skwovet looks to be in the same predicament. Fortunately, Skwovet evolves into Greedent, gobbles down the rest of the food, and gives Goh the victory in the contest.
1135	1128	48	"A Close Call... Practically!" (A Close Call with Practically Pikachu!); Transliteration: "Hobo Hobo Pikachū Kiki Ippatsu!" (Japanese: ほぼほぼピカチュウ危機一髪！)	December 4, 2020	March 5, 2021
Ash and Goh are visiting Castelia City in the Unova region. However, Team Rocket secretly gets there before them, intending to steal Pikachu by swapping it with their mech "Almost Pikachu", which looks and acts just like Pikachu. The problem is, when the two Pikachu start playing together and moving about, they cannot tell which is which! When they do finally grab one of them (which is actually the fake Pikachu), Lucario and Cinderace (who have not been getting along very well) see this happen, and chase after Team Rocket and rescue the fake Pikachu, all the while being stuck together by Team Rocket's sticky grabber. Meanwhile, Ash, Goh and the real Pikachu, oblivious to the whole thing are having a great time tasting the dessert delicacies of the Unova region.

== Release ==
The season premiered from November 17, 2019, to December 4, 2020, on TV Tokyo channel 7, and in the United States, it releases as a streaming television season that premiered from June 12, 2020, to March 5, 2021, on Netflix, making it the first Pokémon series not to air on conventional broadcast television in the USA, unlike previous series. It premiered in Canada on Teletoon on a weekly basis from May 9, 2020, to June 5, 2021.

The Pokémon Company International said on April 23, 2020, that Netflix has acquired the U.S. rights to future seasons, beginning with "Pokémon Journeys," for release in the country. Episodes were released in quarterly groups of twelve. On September 13, 2020, it was announced the anime will switch from airing on Sundays to Fridays on October 9, 2020. The show began airing on September 1, 2020, on Pop in the United Kingdom. The show aired on Pop Max on August 30, 2021.

== Music ==
The Japanese opening song is "One, Two, Three" (1(ワン)・2(ツー)・3(スリー), Wan, Tsū, Surī) by After the Rain's Soraru and Mafumafu for 31 episodes, and by Nishikawa-kun and Kirishō (Takanori Nishikawa and Shō Kiryūin) for 17 episodes (The first episode is used as the ending theme, credited as the main theme song). The ending songs are "Pokémon Shiritori" (ポケモンしりとり, Pokemon Shiritori) by the Pokémon Music Club's Junichi Masuda, Pasocom Music Club, and Pokémon Kids 2019, divided into two parts: the Pikachu → Mew Ver. (ピカチュウ→ミュウVer., Pikachū → Myū Ver.) for 18 episodes and for 5 episodes ended in even numbers, 40, 42, 44, 46, and 48; and the Mew → Zamazenta Ver. (ミュウ→ザマゼンタVer., Myū → Zamazenta Ver.) for 20 episodes and for 4 episodes ended in odd numbers, 41, 43, 45, and 47, the Japanese main theme song of Pokémon the Movie: Secrets of the Jungle, "Strange and Wonderful Creatures" (ふしぎなふしぎな生きもの, Fushigi na Fushigi na Ikimono) by Tortoise Matsumoto (Ulfuls) for 1 episode to promote the movie, and the English opening song is "The Journey Starts Today" by Walk off the Earth. Its instrumental version serves as the ending theme.

== Reception ==
=== Critical response ===
The series received a B+ score at Anime News Network.
