= Sayaka Kinoshita =

Japanese voice actress

Sayaka Kinoshita (木下 紗華, Kinoshita Sayaka) is a Japanese voice actress. She is the official Japanese dubbing voice for Kristen Stewart, especially in The Twilight Saga series.

== Filmography ==
=== Television animation ===
- Blue Dragon (2007-2008) – Valkyrie
- Net Ghost PiPoPa (2008) – Eriko Murata, Bot
- Princess Tutu (2004) – female student (ep 16); Girl (ep 15); Waniko (ep 10)
- Magical Girl Lyrical Nanoha (2004) – director Makihara (ep 1); Player (ep 3); Student (ep 9); Woman (ep 2)
- Elemental Gelade (2005) – Lapis; Mode
- Mahoraba: Heartful days (2005) – Miyabi Shirogane; Tachibana
- Musashi Gundoh (2006) – Yukimura Sanada
- Night Head Genesis (2006) – Hiroko Sato
- Strawberry Panic! (2006) – Kaname Kenjo
- Kanon (2007) – Waitress
- The Familiar of Zero: Rondo of Princesses (2008) – Brigitte
- Phantom: Requiem for the Phantom (2009) – Eva Stone
- Beelzebub (2011) – Misaki Oga, Lord En
- Level E (2011) – Tachibana
- The File of Young Kindaichi Returns (2014) – Kiyoko Shikibu
- Pikaia! (2015) – Irma
- Gravity Rush: Overture (2016) – Raven
- Pocket Monsters: Sun & Moon (2017-18) – Lusamine
- Kamisama Minarai: Himitsu no Cocotama (2017) – Tama-Shine
- Pikaia!! (2017) – Irma
- The Ancient Magus' Bride (2018) – Elias Ainsworth (Female Form)
- The Legend of the Galactic Heroes: Die Neue These Kaikō (2018) – Jessica Edwards
- Karakuri Circus (2018) - Naya Steele
- Boogiepop and Others (2019) – Makiko Kisugi
- Pocket Monsters: Sun & Moon (2018-19) – Lusamine
- One Piece (2019) – Mororon
- My Hero Academia (2020) - Rumi Usagiyama/Mirko
- Black Clover (2020) – Bow Nokde
- Birdie Wing: Golf Girls' Story (2022) – Klein Clara
- Pocket Monsters: The Series (2022) – Lusamine

=== Original video animation (OVA) ===
- Papillon Rose (2003) – Sister Biene
- Aki Sora (2009) – Sora Aoi
- Brotherhood: Final Fantasy XV (2016) – Gentiana

=== Video games ===
- Gravity Rush (2012) – Raven
- Gravity Rush Remastered (2015) – Raven
- Overwatch (2016) - Athena
- Final Fantasy XV (2016) – Gentiana
- Gravity Rush 2 (2017) – Raven
- Action Taimanin (2019) – Ingrid
- Genshin Impact (2020) – Apep
- Biohazard Village (2021) – Mother Miranda*

=== Dubbing ===
==== Live-action ====
- Kristen Stewart
  - Twilight – Bella Swan
  - The Twilight Saga: New Moon – Bella Swan
  - The Twilight Saga: Eclipse – Bella Swan
  - The Twilight Saga: Breaking Dawn – Part 1 – Bella Swan
  - The Twilight Saga: Breaking Dawn – Part 2 – Bella Swan
  - Still Alice – Lydia Howland
  - American Ultra – Phoebe Larson
  - Personal Shopper – Maureen Cartwright
  - Billy Lynn's Long Halftime Walk – Kathryn Lynn
  - Charlie's Angels – Sabina Wilson
  - Seberg – Jean Seberg
  - Underwater – Norah Price
- 50/50 – Rachael (Bryce Dallas Howard)
- Abduction – Karen Murphy (Lily Collins)
- Almost Never – Sasha (Kimberly Wyatt)
- Anaconda 3: Offspring – Dr. Amanda Hayes (Crystal Allen)
- Anna Karenina – Princess Darya "Dolly" Alexandrovna Oblonskaya (Kelly Macdonald)
- Ava – Ava Faulkner (Jessica Chastain)
- Babylon A.D. – Aurora (Mélanie Thierry)
- Bacurau – Teresa (Bárbara Colen)
- Batman Begins (2008 Fuji TV edition) – Rachel Dawes (Katie Holmes)
- Beverly Hills Cop II (Netflix edition) – Karla Fry (Brigitte Nielsen)
- Bleeding Steel – Xiao Su (Erica Xia-hou)
- Brawl in Cell Block 99 – Lauren Thomas (Jennifer Carpenter)
- Broadchurch – Tom Miller (Adam Wilson), Abby Thompson (Phoebe Waller-Bridge)
- The Butterfly Effect 3: Revelations – Jenna Reide (Rachel Miner)
- By Way of Helena – Marisol (Alice Braga)
- The Chaser – Kim Mi-jin (Seo Young-hee)
- The Continental: From the World of John Wick – KD (Mishel Prada)
- Death Race – Case (Natalie Martinez)
- Deep Blue Sea 3 – Emma Collins (Tania Raymonde)
- The Descendants – Alexandra "Alex" King (Shailene Woodley)
- The Devil Inside – Isabella Rossi (Fernanda Andrade)
- Dreamland – Trish (Freema Agyeman)
- Final Destination 5 – Olivia Castle (Jacqueline MacInnes Wood)
- From Vegas to Macau – Detective Luo Xin (Jing Tian)
- Game of Thrones – Shae (Sibel Kekilli)
- Gossip Girl – Elise Wells (Emma Demar), Agnes Andrews (Willa Holland), Lisa Loeb
- Grand Piano – Ashley (Tamsin Egerton)
- Great White – Kaz Fellows (Katrina Bowden)
- House of Cards – Zoe Barnes (Kate Mara)
- I Feel Pretty – Mallory (Emily Ratajkowski)
- Jigsaw – Anna (Laura Vandervoort)
- John Carter – Sarah Carter (Amanda Clayton)
- Krampus – Max Engel (Emjay Anthony)
- Live by Night – Graciela Corrales (Zoe Saldaña)
- The Lord of the Rings: The Rings of Power – Míriel (Cynthia Addai-Robinson)
- Magic Mike XXL – Zoe (Amber Heard)
- Martha Marcy May Marlene – Martha/Marcy May/"Marlene" Lewis (Elizabeth Olsen)
- MaXXXine – Elizabeth Bender (Elizabeth Debicki)
- Morgan – Lee Weathers (Kate Mara)
- The Mortal Instruments: City of Bones – Clarissa Fray/Clarissa Morgenstern (Lily Collins)
- Nelyubov – Zhenya (Maryana Spivak)
- Mortal Kombat – Sonya Blade (Jessica McNamee)
- Mortal Kombat II – Sonya Blade (Jessica McNamee)
- NCIS: Los Angeles – Kensi Blye (Daniela Ruah)
- New Amsterdam – Dr. Helen Sharpe (Freema Agyeman)
- Numb – Cheryl (Marie Avgeropoulos)
- Office Christmas Party – Tracey Hughes (Olivia Munn)
- Once Upon a Time – Queen Elsa (Georgina Haig)
- Patient Zero – Dr. Gina Rose (Natalie Dormer)
- Penny Dreadful – Vanessa Ives (Eva Green)
- Peter Rabbit – Mopsy Rabbit
- Peter Rabbit 2: The Runaway – Mopsy Rabbit
- Police Story 2013 – Miao Miao (Jing Tian)
- The Predator – Dr. Casey Bracket (Olivia Munn)
- Push – Kira Hudson / Hollis (Camilla Belle)
- Quantico – Alex Parrish (Priyanka Chopra)
- Ruby Sparks – Ruby Tiffany Sparks (Zoe Kazan)
- Santa's Slay – Mary McKenzie (Emilie de Ravin)
- Scream – Amber Freeman (Mikey Madison)
- Shang-Chi and the Legend of the Ten Rings – Ying Li (Fala Chen)
- Stalingrad – Katya (Maria Smolnikova)
- Step Up: All In – Alexxa Brava (Izabella Miko)
- The Strangers – Dollface (Gemma Ward)
- Straw Dogs – Amy Sumner (Kate Bosworth)
- Stuber – Becca (Betty Gilpin)
- Supergirl – Lena Luthor (Katie McGrath)
- Taken – Sheerah (Holly Valance)
- Taxi Driver – Iris "Easy" Steensma (Jodie Foster)
- Tekken – Christie Monteiro (Kelly Overton)
- Transformers: The Last Knight – Quintessa (Gemma Chan)
- The Transporter Refueled – Anna (Loan Chabanol)
- Turistas – Bea (Olivia Wilde)
- Tusk – Ally Leon (Genesis Rodriguez)
- Un plan parfait – Isabelle (Diane Kruger)
- The Vampire Diaries – Elena Gilbert (Nina Dobrev)
- Wanted (2019 BS Japan edition) – Cathy (Kristen Hager)
- War Dogs – Iz (Ana de Armas)
- The Ward – Kristen (Amber Heard)
- Warrior – Ah Toy (Olivia Cheng)
- White House Down – Jenna (Jackie Geary)
- Wild Romance – Yoo Eun-jae (Lee Si-young)

==== Animation ====
- Avengers Assemble – Black Widow
- Code Lyoko – Yumi Ishiyama
- Pucca – Pucca
- Tinker Bell and the Lost Treasure – Viola
- Ultimate Spider-Man – Black Widow
- Winter Sonata Anime – Oh Chae-rin
