= Pikaia! =

Anime television series

ピカイア!
- Genre: Drama, Slice of Life
- Anime television series
- Directed by: Daiki Tomiyasu
- Studio: OLM; Production I.G. (pilot)
- Original network: NHK Educational TV
- Original run: April 29, 2015 – July 30, 2015
- Episodes: 13
- Anime television series

Pikaia!!
- Studio: OLM
- Original network: NHK Educational TV
- Original run: February 26, 2017 – May 27, 2017
- Episodes: 13

Pikaia! (ピカイア!) is a Japanese educational anime series produced by NHK Educational. The first season started airing on April 29, 2015, for 13 episodes before ending on July 30, 2015. It is renewed with a second season in February 2017.

== Plot ==
The story begins in the future when Earth itself is no longer inhabitable by living creatures. Humans began their interstellar migration with space colonies. Vince and Hana work as researchers in the Cambrian Project. Together with the creature Pikaia, they seek the Lost Code, the key to restoring Earth, and aim to return to Cambrian-era Earth.

== Characters ==
Hannah Anning (ハンナ = アニング, Hanna Aningu)
Voiced by: Ayaka Suwa
Vincent Light (ヴィンセント = ライト, Vinsento Raito)
Voiced by: Hayato Taka
Pikaia (ピカイア, Pikaia)
Voiced by: Kaori Mizuhashi
Dr. Parker (パーカー博士, Pākā Hakase)
Voiced by: Toru Ohkawa
Morris (モーリス, Mōrisu)
Voiced by: Hirofumi Nojima
Will (ウィル, Wiru)
Voiced by: Akira Nishitani
Harry (ハリー, Harī)
Voiced by: Wataru Urata
President Irma (イルマ大統領, Iruma Daitōryō)
Voiced by: Sayaka Kinoshita
Vice-President Frazer (フレイザー副大統領, Fureizā Fuku Daitōryō)
Voiced by: Tetsu Inada
Wendy Owen (ウェンディ・オーウェン, Wendi Ōwen)
Voiced by: Aimi Tanaka
Edward Edwards (エドワルド・エドワーズ, Edowarudo Edowāzu)
Voiced by: Nobuyuki Hiyama
Evol (エヴォル, Evoru)
Voiced by: Takuma Nagatsuka
Shadow A, Shadow B (影A、影B, Kage A, Kage B)
Voiced by: Hiroaki Tajiri (A), Isamu Yūsen (B)
Characters who appear only in the pilot.
Dr. Parker (パーカー博士, Pākā Hakase)
Voiced by: Miyuu Tsuji (Miyuu), Rie Hanafusa (Rie), Shio Kisui (Mii)
The members of elfin', who sing the openings and endings and appear in an educational segment with Morris. Shio was known as Mii Takahashi when the series aired.
