= After the Rain (duo) =

Japanese supergroup

- Also known as: Soraru X Mafumafu; Sorairo Mafura; SoraMafu
- Origin: Japan
- Genres: J-pop, anison
- Years active: 2016–present
- Label: NBC Universal (2016–present)
- Spinoffs: SoraMafuUraSaka
- Members: Soraru; Mafumafu
- Website: https://nbcuni-music.com/aftertherain/

After the Rain is a Japanese superduo under the music label NBCUniversal Entertainment Japan. The group abbreviations are mainly AtR and SoraMafu. The group consists of two members who were famous on Niconico for their covers: Soraru and Mafumafu.

== History ==
The group is active on Niconico. The official name of the group was formed by Mafumafu and Soraru. Previously, their group was active as Soraru X Mafumafu (also known as Sorairo Muffler (そらいろまふらー, Sorairo Mafurā)). They made collaboration videos and the radio show Hikikomoranai Radio. They released the albums After the Rain Quest and Prerhythm Arch. In music making, Soraru performs vocals, mixing and mastering and Mafumafu is in charge of vocals, songwriting and arrangement. In this way, they share all the work between themselves. In addition, they work on live performances and merchandise.

The origin of the name was revealed in an interview. They said: "We were often sad and in pain, but from now on, we want to walk in the world after such rain".

In the winter of 2015, before the unit group name was officially announced, the After the Rain Winter Tour 2015 was held in Nagoya, Osaka, Fukuoka and Tokyo. Additionally, a one-man live show, After the Rain (Mafumafu X Soraru) Ryogoku Kokugikan 2016 Morning Glow After Glow, was held at Ryogoku Kokugikan for two days on July 16 and 17, and attended by 12,000 people.

In April 2016, After the Rain's official homepage featured a joke that they would now be known as Mahō Shōjo After the Rain (魔法少女あふた〜ざ☆れいん, Mahō shōjo afuta za rein), a unit consisting of Soraruko-chan (Soraru) and Mafuyuchan (Mafumafu). It was actually to promote their album Mahō Shōjo After the Rain Miracle Box (魔法少女あふた〜ざ☆れいん ミラクルBOX, Mahō shōjo afuta za rein mirakuru bokkusu), which was sold at the venue of their After the Rain Ryogoku Kokugikan 2016 tour and sold out. Kurocrest Story, the band's first proper album followed on April 13, 2016, and made it into the top 100 yearly ranking.

In 2015, the After the Rain Tour 2016 Winter Garden was held in Sapporo, Osaka, Nagoya, and Tokyo in winter 2016. Also, because Soraru was ill, the Tokyo performance was postponed and a transfer performance was held on February 23.

On April 12, 2017, the duo made their debut with the simultaneous release of two singles, "Kaidoku Funō" and "Anticlockwise", the opening and ending songs of the anime Atom: The Beginning and Clockwork Planet, respectively. On the weekly Oricon Singles Chart dated April 24, "Anticlockwise" debuted in 3rd place and "Kaidoku Funō" debuted at number 4.

On August 9–10, 2017, the live After the Rain Nippon Budokan 2017: Clockwise / Anti-Clockwise tour was held at Nippon Budokan and was attended by 26,000 fans.

Continuing on from 2016, 2017 and 2018, on April Fool's Day a new song was announced by the two who became girls with Mahō Shōjo After the rain specifications.

The live After the Rain Saitama Super Arena 2018 Rain-making Feast/Feast of Begging was held on August 7 and 8, 2018. It was attended by 36,000 people in total across two days.

On September 5 of the same year, the duo's second album Izanaware Traveler was released, making it their first album in two-and-a-half years. On the weekly Oricon Albums Chart dated September 17, 2018, the initial sales were 82,280, which greatly exceeded the previous work's 36,000, and debuted in second place. The album was certified gold on October 10, 2018.

The duo's song 1・2・3 was the Japanese opening theme of Pokémon Journeys: The Series from November 2019 until December 2022; being sung by various artists throughout the series's run, including After the Rain themselves.

== Members ==
List of members
Name		Position	Color
English	Japanese	Position	Color
Soraru	そらる	Vocal, partial lyrics / composition, mixing, mastering, guitar	Blue
Mafumafu	まふまふ	Vocal, songwriting, arrangement, guitar, bass, piano	White

== Discography ==
=== Album ===
List of albums, with selected details and peak chart positions
Title	Album details	Peak position
Title	Album details	JPN
Crocrest Story	Released: April 13, 2016; Label: NBCUniversal; Formats: CD, CD+DVD, digital download; Track listing: 1. "Ōka ni Tsukiyo to Sode Shigure"; 2. "Mōmoku Shōjo to Grizaille"; 3. "Ten Yadori"; 4. "Garakuta no Tsukuri-kata"; 5. "Wasuremono"; 6. "Insomnia"; 7. "Spica"; 8. "Sekai Chic ni Shōnen Shōjo"; 9. "Tamen Kusa"; 10. "Machibōke no Kanata"; 11. "Saezuri"; 12. "Chocolate to Himitsu no Recipe"; 13. "Never Ending Reversi"; 14. "Aster"; 15. "Eye Sleep Well"	2
Izanaware Traveler	Released: September 5, 2018; Label: NBCUniversal; Formats: CD, CD+DVD, digital download; Track listing: 1. "Kaidoku Funō"; 2. "Antivirus"; 3. "Senri no Yume to Mayu"; 4. "Shiki Oriori ni Tayutaite"; 5. "Hanamai no March"; 6. "Merry Bad End"; 7. "Hello Distopia"; 8. "Fortune"; 9. "Dorobō Kenmonroku"; 10. "Marine Snow no Hanataba wo" 11. "Hakoniwa Kaagami"; 12. "Kaisei no Basuninoru"; 13. "Zettai Yoi ko No Et Cetera"; 14. "Anticlockwise"; 15. "Elix"; 16. "Samayō Bokura no Sekai Kikō"	—
I'm Your Hero	Released: October 18, 2023; Label: Universal Music LLC; Formats: CD, CD+DVD, digital download; Track listing: 1. "1・2・3 (2023 ver.)" 2. "Ice Cream Complex"; 3. "Red Sprite"; 4. "Moa"; 5. "Tokyo Clone"; 6. "Origami to Hakkei"; 7. "Banka Ryouran"; 8. "Raia"; 9. "Hello Mujika"; 10. "Nightcrawler"; 11. "Remu"; 12. "Terrestial"; 13. "Wedding Dress"; 14. "Mekakushi Shoujo to Shinkiro"; 15. "10 Suu Nen Mae no Bokutachi he" 16. "I'm Your Hero"	
春夏秋冬 (Shunkashuutou)	Released: September 16, 2026; Label: Universal Music LLC; Formats: CD, CD+DVD, digital download; Track listing: 1. "As Time Goes By (Inst)"; 2. "Shutter Chance"; 3. "Gemini"; 4. "Hydrangea (Soraru solo)" 5. "Ao no Tarinai Sekai"; 6. "Murakumo ni Kaze, Hana ni Tsuki"; 7. "Ephemeron (Mafumafu solo)" 8. "Hello After Dark"; 9. "Blowout Ceremony (Soraru solo)" 10. "Jingle Bell ga Kikoenai"; 11. "Aruba no Reidou (Mafumafu solo)" 12. "Hayariyamai"; 13. "Harutsugedori"; 14. "Exit (Inst)"	

=== Doujin albums ===
List of doujin albums, with selected details
Title	Album details
After the Rain Quest	Released: April 1, 2014; Label: Celo Project; Formats: CD; Track listing: 1. "Prologue"; 2. "Kūsō Sekai to Omocha no Shinzō"; 3. "Tsukisase"; 4. "Eimin Dōwa"; 5. "Kakushi Goto"; 6. "Scheme"; 7. "Irie no Kuni"; 8. "Ryokushōiro no Yūutsu"; 9. "Dai 2-ji Karakuri Kokka Keikaku"; 10. "Poco"; 11. "Cradle; 12. "Super Nuko World"; 13. "Sora Iro ma Furaji wo (Soshitedensetsuhe)"
Prerhythm Arch	Released: August 16, 2015; Label: Celo Project; Formats: CD; Track listing: 1. "Memory"; 2. "Monochro to Yūsha no Idenshi"; 3. "Usotsuki Majo to Haiiro no Niji"; 4. "Kagami Hanamidzuki"; 5. "Gikyoku to Deforume Toshi"; 6. "Vil"; 7. "Heart no Atoaji"; 8. "Sei ni Sugari Tsuku"; 9. "Ai no Sample"; 10. "Shopan to Kōri no Hakken"; 11. "Insomnia"; 12. "Sekaishikku ni Shōnen"; 13. "Shutchō-ban Hikikomoranai Radio II"
7 × 2 Tsu no Taizai	Released: August 7, 2020; Label: After the Rain; Formats: CD; Track listing: 1. "Judge"; 2. "Kuimyo Shino Idea"; 3. "Cipher"; 4. "Konoyubitomare"; 5. "Karasu"; 6. "Jinsei Gyakuten no Kamiwaza"; 7. "Natsuzora to Sōmatō"; 8. "Rakugakisama"; 9. "Void"; 10. "Yūkoku, Yume to mi Fun-u"

=== Singles ===
List of singles
Title	Release date
"Kaidoku Funō"	April 12, 2017
"Anti-Clockwise"	April 12, 2017
"1・2・3"	December 15, 2019

== Filmography ==
=== TV shows ===
List of TV shows
Date	Title	Japanese title	Network
April 4 – May 2, 2016	Music Ru TV	musicるTV	TV Asahi
