= Amatsuki (musician) =

Japanese musician (born 1991)

Amatsuki 天月-あまつき-
- Born: 30 June 1991 (age 35); Tokyo, Japan
- Genres: J-pop; anison; Vocaloid
- Years active: 2010–present
- Labels: King (2014–2018); Universal Music Japan (2018–present)
- Website: 天月 Official Website

Amatsuki (Japanese: 天月-あまつき-; born 30 June 1991) is a Japanese utaite musician and YouTuber.

== Biography ==
=== Early life ===
Amatsuki was born on 30 June 1991 in Tokyo, Japan. During his childhood, he dreamed of becoming Kamen Rider. When he was young, he was bullied at school, and he struggled to build trusting friendships. He liked to sing and was enthusiastic about listening to music from his favorite movies and video games. At that time, Amatsuki purchased Porno Graffiti's single, Melissa, the first opening theme song to the anime Full Metal Alchemist, as his first CD, liking the band's music and influenced by the single's music producer, Akimitsu Honma, to this day. Since 2007, he has been interested in cover videos (歌ってみた) posted by active members on the video sharing site NicoNico, including those by other cover artists known as utaite (歌い手) with whom he later became friends such as Tonari no Sakata (隣の坂田), Tomohisa Sako (佐香智久), Kuroneko (96猫), Shima (志麻), etc.

=== 2014–present: Career ===
After joining the baseball team in high school, he was put in charge of vocals in a friend's band for the school festival. After 2009, he bought a cheap Skype microphone and started live streaming with a mix of expectation and nerves. In 2010, he uploaded his first Vocaloid song cover and began his activities as an utaite. Worried about his singing abilities as a novice, he increased his work in order improve. In the beginning, he did not imagine performing live on stage. However, through his activities on video sharing sites he gained recognition and increased his network such that in 2010 he participated in a live concert with other utaites. At the time, he was attending university to become a primary school teacher but drawn by the reciprocal charm of streaming and music where the performer and the audience can both have fun, he gradually began to consider pursuing music. Following this, from 2012 to 2016, along with four friends he met through various video sites (Hashiyan, Kashitaro Ito, un;c, and Kony), Amatsuki went on a live tour with the group performing under the name Circle of Friends (COF). With his first solo live in 2012, he performed music to his audience face-to-face, experiencing the unity and reciprocity that could not be obtained just through online views. In the same year, he released his first CD, Melodic note. On July 16th 2014, he debuted his first major album Hello, World! under King Records, announcing the release via his YouTube channel. In 2015, he released an album with fellow singer, Hashiyan, under the unit name Melost.

In 2016, Amatsuki released his 2nd album, Hakoniwa Dramatic (箱庭ドラマチック), focusing on the "dramatic" points in one's life. In this album, he also participates in lyric writing and composition. Through his various collaborations with film projects (such as creating the opening theme song to the Digimon series of which he was a childhood fan), live concerts, festival appearances, and a wide variety of promotional activities, Amatsuki has expanded his audience to include a wide range of ages as well as male listeners. In June 2018, he released his 3rd album, Sorewa Kitto Koi Deshita. (それはきっと恋でした。), which presents various perspectives on romance. In addition to the songs, the white background and the blue roses of the album's cover carry deep meaning to the artist. On August 23rd 2018, Amatsuki realized his dream and performed a one-man concert at the Nippon Budokan. As in all of his live performances, he reflected on his life and career thus far and thanked all the people who supported him. In October 2018, he transferred to Universal Music Japan. In July 2019, Amatsuki held a 10-year anniversary live at Osaka-jō Hall. Through December 2019 to January 2020, he held a live tour at the Tokyo International Forum Hall A to celebrate all the miracles and encounters he had experienced over the past 10 years.

In April 2020, as part of his 10-year anniversary tour, Amatsuki had planned a 2-day solo concert at the Makuhari Event Hall, however, due to the spread of COVID-19, the performance was postponed. On August 29th and 30th of that year, in the same event hall, he performed a solo concert to an empty theatre, live streaming his performance with approximately 50,000 people attending virtually over the two days. On December 30th 2020, he held a live stream of his Resfeber solo concert at the Tokyo International Forum Hall A.

As both a listener and an artist, Amatsuki enjoys releasing music. Since his major debut, he has continued to release albums in cooperation with his label. At the same time, since the beginning of his career, Amatsuki has continued to regularly upload videos and live stream on NicoNico and YouTube, following his unchanging desire to share his videos and music. He also continues to deepen his friendships with the artists he has met during his singing career (such as Mafumafu, Eve, etc.) through mutual collaborations on songs and by contributing to their lyric writing and music production. In addition to performing concerts overseas, Amatsuki has increased the range and variety of his activities to include voice acting, theatrical plays, closet dramas, and television appearances. In July 2021, Amatsuki joined the professional gaming team Crazy Raccoon as a streamer.

== Discography ==
=== Single ===
	Date Released	Title	Label	Standard	Standard part code	List of music	Highest ranks
1st	7 October 2015	虹の向こうへ/星月夜 (Niji no mukō e/ hoshidzukiyo)	King Records	First limited edition (with DVD)	KICM-91623	3 songs CD: 1. 虹の向こうへ (Niji no mukō e); 2. 星月夜 (Hoshizukiyo); 3. Dear Moon; DVD: 1. 虹の向こうへ (Niji no mukō e) Music Video; 2. 星月夜 (Hoshizukiyo) Music Video～short ver.～; 3. 虹の向こうへ メイキング映像 (Niji no mukō e meikingu eizō)	15
1st	7 October 2015	虹の向こうへ/星月夜 (Niji no mukō e/ hoshidzukiyo)	King Records	Normal Edition	KICM-1623	3 songs CD: 1. 虹の向こうへ (Niji no mukō e); 2. 星月夜 (Hoshizukiyo); 3. Dear Moon; DVD: 1. 虹の向こうへ (Niji no mukō e) Music Video; 2. 星月夜 (Hoshizukiyo) Music Video～short ver.～; 3. 虹の向こうへ メイキング映像 (Niji no mukō e meikingu eizō)	15
2nd	14 December 2016	DiVE!!	King Records	Limited Edition	KICM-9174	4 song CD: 1. DiVE!!; 2. 明星の刃 (Myōjō no ha); 3. プレゼント (Present); 4. 小さな恋のうた (Chīsanakoinōta) -cover ver.-; DVD: 1. 「DiVE!!」Music Video; 2. ジャケット (Jacket) & Music Video Shooting making video	12
2nd	14 December 2016	DiVE!!	King Records	Normal Edition	KICM-91741	4 Songs CD: 1. DiVE!!; 2. 明星の刃 (Myōjō no ha); 3. プレゼント (Present); 4. 君が待つあの丘へ Kimi ga matsu ano oka e	12
2nd	14 December 2016	DiVE!!	King Records	Anime board	KICM-91745	2 Songs CD: 1. DiVE!!; 2. DiVE!! -off vocal ver	12
3rd	19 July 2017	Mr.Fake/ツナゲル (Mr.Fake/Tsunageru)	King Records	First Press Limited Edition TYPE-A	KICM-91773	全5曲 CD: 1. Mr.Fake; 2. 明星の刃 (Myōjō no ha); 3. ツナゲル (Tsunageru); 4. 未来の星命 (Mirai no seimei); 5. ハートフルエッジ (Heart full edge) -Acoustic Arrange-; DVD-A: 1. Mr.fake Music Video; 2. 「Mr.Fake/ツナゲル」Photo&Music Video Shooting close contact special; DVD-B: 1. 「箱庭ドラマチックTOUR 2016~今夜、君が待つあの丘へ~」厳選ライブ映像	6
3rd	19 July 2017	Mr.Fake/ツナゲル (Mr.Fake/Tsunageru)	King Records	First Press Limited Edition TYPE-B	KICM-91774	全5曲 CD: 1. Mr.Fake; 2. 明星の刃 (Myōjō no ha); 3. ツナゲル (Tsunageru); 4. 未来の星命 (Mirai no seimei); 5. ハートフルエッジ (Heart full edge) -Acoustic Arrange-; DVD-A: 1. Mr.fake Music Video; 2. 「Mr.Fake/ツナゲル」Photo&Music Video Shooting close contact special; DVD-B: 1. 「箱庭ドラマチックTOUR 2016~今夜、君が待つあの丘へ~」厳選ライブ映像	6
3rd	19 July 2017	Mr.Fake/ツナゲル (Mr.Fake/Tsunageru)	King Records	Normal Edition	KICM-1775	3 songs CD: 1. Mr.Fake; 2. ツナゲル (Tsunageru); 3. 未来の星命 (Mirai no seimei)	6
4th	16 January 2019	恋人募集中（仮）(Koibito boshū-chū (kari))	Universal Music Group	First Press Limited Edition A	UICZ-9106	4 songs CD: 1. 恋人募集中（仮）(Koibito boshū-chū (kari)); 2. STARTRAiN; 3. 恋に溺れて (Koi ni oborete); 4. ほしのこもりうた (Hoshino komori uta)	2
4th	16 January 2019	恋人募集中（仮）(Koibito boshū-chū (kari))	Universal Music Group	First Press Limited Edition B	UICZ-9107	4 songs CD: 1. 恋人募集中（仮）(Koibito boshū-chū (kari)); 2. STARTRAiN; 3. 恋に溺れて (Koi ni oborete); 4. StarMan!!!	2
4th	16 January 2019	恋人募集中（仮）(Koibito boshū-chū (kari))	Universal Music Group	Normal Edition	UICZ-5101	3 songs CD: 1. 恋人募集中（仮）(Koibito boshū-chū (kari)); 2. STARTRAiN; 3. 恋に溺れて (Koi ni oborete)	2

=== Album ===
	Date released	Title	Label	List of Song album	Highest ranks
1st	27 June 2012	Melodic note.	Bellwood Records	12 Songs CD: 1. 天ノ弱164 (Ten no yowa 164); 2. Japanese Ninja No.1; 3. ノイジーラバーソウル (Noisy Rubber Soul); 4. エンヴィキャットウォーク (Envicat Walk) ～Last Note. Arrange Ver.～; 5. アンチ閑古鳥計画 (Anti Kankodori keikaku); 6. スイート・シュガースティック天月 (Sweet sugar stick Amatsuki); 7. チェックメイト (Checkmate); 8. セツナトリップ (Setsuna trip); 9. 夏の日と、幽霊と、かみさま (Natsu no hi to, yūrei to, kami-sa ma); 10. ポーカーフェイス (Poker face); 11. ハッピーシンセサイザ (Happy Synthesizer); 12. 泣き虫アンサンブル (Nakimushi ensemble)	19
2nd	27 February 2013	君ヲ想フ月 (Kimi wo sō fu tsuki)	Bellwood Records	13 songs CD: 1. START; 2. 影踏みエトランゼ (Kagefumi etoranze); 3. -EARTH DAY-; 4. ハートフルエッジ (Heart full edge); 5. アブラカタブラ！ (Abracadabra!); 6. 1/6 -out of the gravity-; 7. こちら、幸福安心委員会です。(Kochira, kōfuku anshin iinkaidesu.); 8. 月光戦争 (Gekkō sensō); 9. HELLO; 10. ネトゲ廃人シュプレヒコール (Netoge haijin Sprechchor); 11. え？あぁ、そう。(E? A~a,-sō.); 12. Calc.; 13. 恋愛勇者 (Ren'ai yūsha)	16

=== Major album ===
	Date released	Title	Label	Highest ranks
1st	16 July 2014	Hello world	King Records	4
2nd	27 July 2016	Hakoniwa Dramatic	King Records	8
3rd	27 June 2018	Sore wa kitto koideshita	King Records	5

==== Mini album ====
	Date released	Title	Label	List of Song
1st	12 August 2013	StarT LiNe	Amatsuki	8 Songs CD: 1. はじまりのうた (Hajimari no uta); 2. 酸素の海 (Sanso no umi); 3. キミノオト (Kimi no oto); 4. 学級レジスタンス (Gakkyū resistance); 5. 迷子の僕に (Maigo no boku ni); 6. アイロニ (Ironi); 7. シューティングスター (Shooting star); 8. You
2nd	2 March 2015	僕+君の約束。(Boku + kimi no yakusoku.)	Amatsuki	4 Songs CD: 1. 桜のじゅもん (Sakura no jumon); 2. 空の飛び方 (Soranotobikata); 3. With all one's might 4. 花信風 (Kashin-fū)
