= Atom: The Beginning =

Japanese manga series

- First volume cover, featuring A106

アトム ザ・ビギニング (Atomu za Biginingu)
- Genre: Science fiction
- Created by: Osamu Tezuka (concept); Tezuka Productions (cooperation)
- Manga
- Written by: Masami Yuki (concept works); Makoto Tezuka (supervision)
- Illustrated by: Tetsurō Kasahara
- Published by: Hero's Inc.
- English publisher: NA/UK: Titan Publishing Group
- Imprint: Hero's Comics
- Magazine: Monthly Hero's (December 1, 2014 – October 30, 2020); Comiplex (November 27, 2020 – present)
- Original run: December 1, 2014 – present
- Volumes: 27
- Anime television series
- Directed by: Katsuyuki Motohiro (chief); Tatsuo Satō
- Produced by: Naohiko Furuichi; Fuminori Yamazaki; Kazuaki Takahashi; Mariko Satō; Isamu Yoshikuni; Masato Ishiwatari; Shinichi Nakatsuka; Nobuko Irie
- Written by: Junichi Fujisaku
- Music by: Noriyuki Asakura
- Studio: OLM; Production I.G; Signal.MD
- Licensed by: NA: Sentai Filmworks
- Original network: NHK G
- Original run: April 15, 2017 – July 8, 2017
- Episodes: 12
- icon

Atom: The Beginning (Japanese: アトム ザ・ビギニング, Hepburn: Atomu za Biginingu) is a Japanese manga series written and illustrated by Tetsurō Kasahara, with writing contributions by Makoto Tezuka and Masami Yuki. It was serialized in Hero's Inc.'s Monthly Hero's magazine from December 2014 to October 2020 and transferred to the Comiplex digital platform in November 2020. Its chapters have been collected in 27 tankōbon volumes as of November 2026. An anime television series adaptation aired from April to July 2017.

The manga is based on Osamu Tezuka's Astro Boy series and is initially set up as a prequel, depicting the events up until the birth of Astro Boy. However, as the story progresses, discrepancies with the main story of Astro Boy emerge, and it is later revealed to be a different world with a divergent history from that of Astro Boy after an incident in 1969.

== Plot ==
It is five years after a catastrophe of unknown cause occurred in Japan. The young genius duo from Nerima University, Umatarō Tenma and Hiroshi Ochanomizu, work together to develop a new type of artificial intelligence called Bewußtsein, which has an "ego" or "mind". Equipped with it, they create an autonomous robot named A106 ("Atom" in Japanese wordplay), which has a will and a personality. However, their Laboratory 7 is chronically short of funds. In addition, it is difficult for the faculty to understand them. To earn funds, they participate in a Robot Wrestling tournament for the prize money. They win by exploiting the weaknesses of their opponents, and in the end, they shut down the previous champion, Mars, to win the tournament, and become the center of attention.

However, things take an unexpected turn when they try to find out more about Dr. Lolo, the developer of Mars, out of curiosity. As a result, both Umatarō and Hiroshi end up being targeted by a mysterious organization, as they get involved in the secrets of the underworld, the murkiness of the government, and the darkness of the catastrophe five years ago, but this does not damper their spirits. At the request of the Ministry of Science and the university's upper management, they are asked to participate in the World Robot Battling (WRB) event in Australia with the successor to A106, A107 (Yuran). However, as Yuran's enthusiasm for the competition spread, the other robots began to run amok. In the end, the WRB is cancelled, and when they return to Japan, Hiroshi's grandfather, who had been out of town, appeared before them. What he told them was an unbelievable story about a "boy-shaped robot from the future" (which Hiroshi had heard of before). Based on the information his grandfather had given him, Umatarō and Hiroshi headed for Ho Chi Minh City in Vietnam. There, they incompletely solve the mystery of the boy-shaped robot in question.

== Characters ==
Umatarō Tenma (天馬 午太郎, Tenma Umatarō)
Voiced by: Yuichi Nakamura
A 19-year-old graduate student doing robotics research at Laboratory 7, Department of Robotics, Nerima University, who skipped five years of school, earning his undergraduate credits within a year of entering the university and moving on to the master's program. In terms of age, he is of the same generation as the university's freshmen. He is also working on a new type of AI, the Bewußtsein, and is also involved in the development of onboard equipment and power units for robots, with the one currently under development capable of 100,000 horsepower.
Hiroshi Ochanomizu (お茶の水 博志, Ochanomizu Hiroshi)
Voiced by: Takuma Terashima
A 26-year-old graduate student who works with Umatarō on robotics research at Laboratory 7 of the Department of Robotics at Nerima University. He is righteous, gentle, and good-natured. Because of his face, which is also called "little koala" by Umatarō, he is not popular with women, but he doesn't seem to mind as he has little desire of that kind. He is tall and thin at first glance, but he is reasonably strong, likely because he used to organize the scrap material around the laboratory.
A106
Voiced by: Yūki Inoue
Also known as Six. He is the sixth model of the autonomous "A10 Series" robots equipped with Bewußtsein, currently under development in Laboratory 7. His catchphrase in Robot Wrestling is "kindhearted science boy." He was originally conceived by Umatarō as an "ultimate superhuman with seven powers," but Hiroshi decided to change it. He is equipped with Boost Cylinders in his lower arms and legs, which are operated by high-pressure gas, and uses Boost Jumps to enhance his jumping power, a fist attack called the Impact Attack, and a High Speed Beat Punch that is operated continuously.
Motoko Tsutsumi (堤 茂斗子, Tsutsumi Motoko)
Voiced by: Mikako Komatsu
A 20-year-old second-year student at Nerima University's Department of Robotics who specializes in system-related fields such as programming. She is the younger sister of Moriya Tsutsumi. She is the daughter of a wealthy man, and is a beautiful, stylish, and talented young woman.
Ran Ochanomizu (お茶の水 蘭, Ochanomizu Ran)
Voiced by: Ayane Sakura
Hiroshi's half-sister, a 16-year-old girl with glasses who hangs out in her brothers' lab. Her hobby is disassembling machines, often scavenging for parts from the scrap yard in Lab 7. She is a member of her high school's robotics club.
A107
Also known as Yuran. The successor to Six, this autonomous robot was created to complete the A10 series. She has three times the power of Six, a U-shaped muon sensor, and the ability to fly with her microjet system. On the other hand, her batteries are severely depleted, and she is equipped with two spare Sphere Tank batteries.
Kensaku Ban (伴 健作, Ban Kensaku)
Voiced by: Nobuo Tobita
The president of Maruhige Shipping, an anything-goes store where Umatarō and Hiroshi go to work part-time to earn money. He is an old-fashioned type and does not trust robots or computers.
Shunsaku Ban (伴 俊作, Ban Shunsaku)
Voiced by: Kengo Kawanishi
High school student and son of Kensaku. Unlike his father, he loves robots and is a fan of Robot Wrestling. He falls in love with Ran at first sight when they first meet. He calls himself a detective and is inquisitive. He also uses the family tradition of jujutsu for self-defense.
Moriya Tsutsumi (堤 茂理也, Tsutsumi Moriya)
Voiced by: Takahiro Sakurai
A top research student in lab 1 of the Department of Robotics at Nerima University. Like Umatarō, he lost his parents in a major disaster five years ago. He himself is debilitated from the injuries he sustained during the disaster, and uses a robotic chair that he designed himself.
Dr. Lolo (Dr.ロロ, Dr. Roro)
Voiced by: Mitsuki Saiga
A beautiful woman whose identity is unknown except that she is the development designer and owner of Mars. Her true identity is a disguised Moriya Tsutsumi. The only people who know about this are Bremner, who is an acquaintance, and Hiroshi, who learned about it during the WRB commotion, as well as robots such as A106 who are not fooled by the disguise. Motoko notices that she looks a lot like him, but she doesn't think that her brother is dressed as a woman, so she and Umatarō make a wild guess that she is their parents' illegitimate child.
Mars (マルス, Marusu)
Voiced by: Takahiro Sakurai
190 centimeters tall, 120 kilograms in weight, and with 1800 horsepower, this robot was developed as a test bed for military weapons, and is a two-time champion of the robot martial arts event Robot Wrestling. Its catchphrase is "invincible god of war." In addition to an excellent AI comparable to that of the A106, it is equipped with the Knife Hand Strike, a slashing attack that uses super vibration, the Jeter Shield, wings that enables it to fly, and a body made of Zeronium, a new alloy that is still under development, so that even A106's sensors cannot see through Mars's body.
Hikozō Saruta (佐流田 彦蔵, Saruta Hikozō)
Professor of the Department of Robotics at Nerima University. He is an authority on the development of electronic brains, and although he is eccentric, he has overwhelming authority within the university. According to Hiroshi's grandfather, the ultimate goal of his research is to use robotic technology to immortalize humans, which is why he turned his daughter into a cyborg. In WRB, he comes to Australia as a chaperone for all the members of Lab 7, but disappears amidst the runaway commotion.
Hiroshi's Grandfather (博志の祖父, Hiroshi no sofu)
First mentioned in conversations between Hiroshi and Kensaku, he makes his full-scale appearance in chapter 35 of volume 7 of the manga. His real name is unknown. The nickname given to him by Umatarō is "Ochagran." According to him, when Japan was poor after the Pacific War, his parents were forced to work hard and died early because of it, so he decided to create a robot that could work with people. However, he said it should not be a slave that works in place of people, nor should it take work away from people, but a robot with a heart that can work with people, live with them, and share their joy. In order to achieve this goal, he invented many things and developed a number of programming languages, including "N-eva18," which laid the foundation for subsequent robot technology. However, his research was interrupted in 1969 when he encountered a "boy-shaped robot from the future," and he has since been wandering the world looking for the robot that disappeared.
Tsukie Saruta (佐流田 月江, Saruta Tsukie)
Voiced by: Mamiko Noto
The daughter of Professor Saruta and member of the special investigations division of ICE, the International Crime Enquiry organization. She lost her mother in an accident 18 years ago, and also lost her right eye and part of her brain, but her father gave her the ability to see beyond normal human vision and access electronic devices directly.
Hoshie (星江)
Daughter of Tsukie and granddaughter of Professor Saruta. When Tsukie is away for long periods of time on business, she is left in the care of her grandfather, Hikozō. She was brought in by Professor Saruta, who appeared at WRB as a chaperone for Lab 7. She is still in elementary school, but she seems to be conscious of Umatarō.
Maria (マリア)
Voiced by: Yoshino Nanjō
A robot that performs demonstrations for guests at the theme park Mecha City. Her upper body is human-like, but from the waist down, she looks like a spider with six legs (four legs in the anime). In the anime, the parent company of Mecha City also sponsors the Robot Wrestling, so the Robot Wrestling participants attend events in the city, and Maria also serves as the host of Robot Wrestling.

== Media ==
=== Manga ===
Tetsurō Kasahara's Atom: The Beginning began serialization in the Monthly Hero's magazine published by Hero's Inc. on December 1, 2014. Makoto Tezuka and Masami Yuki are responsible for the manga series's editorial supervision and concept design, respectively, with Tezuka Productions collaborating. The magazine ceased publication on October 30, 2020, and the series was transferred to the Comiplex digital platform, starting publication on November 27, 2020. Hero's has collected its chapters into individual tankōbon volumes. The first volume was released on June 5, 2015. As of November 5, 2026, twenty-seven volumes have been released.

The manga is licensed in English by Titan Publishing Group, in partnership with StoneBot Comics. The first volume was released under its Titan Manga imprint on October 11, 2022.

==== Volumes ====
No.	Original release date	Original ISBN	English release date	English ISBN
1	June 5, 2015	978-4-86-468417-0	October 11, 2022	978-1-78773-957-4
2	December 4, 2015	978-4-86-468441-5	December 13, 2022	978-1-78773-958-1
3	June 3, 2016	978-4-86-468462-0	February 14, 2023	978-1-78774-000-6
4	December 5, 2016	978-4-86-468482-8	April 11, 2023	978-1-78774-001-3
5	April 5, 2017	978-4-86-468495-8	July 18, 2023	978-1-78774-002-0
6	June 5, 2017	978-4-86-468503-0	November 7, 2023	978-1-78774-003-7
7	December 5, 2017	978-4-86-468528-3	April 9, 2024	978-1-78774-004-4
8	June 5, 2018	978-4-86-468570-2	July 2, 2024	978-1-78774-005-1
9	December 29, 2018	978-4-86-468607-5	October 22, 2024	978-1-78774-104-1
10	July 5, 2019	978-4-86-468656-3; 978-4-86-468657-0 (SE)	February 4, 2025	978-1-78774-105-8
11	December 5, 2019	978-4-86-468680-8	June 24, 2025	978-1-78774-106-5
12	June 5, 2020	978-4-86-468727-0	September 23, 2025	978-1-78774-107-2
13	December 4, 2020	978-4-86-468765-2	January 20, 2026	978-1-78774-108-9
14	March 5, 2021	978-4-86-468790-4	June 23, 2026	978-1-78774-109-6
15	August 5, 2021	978-4-86-468822-2	—	—
16	January 5, 2022	978-4-86-468863-5	—	—
17	May 27, 2022	978-4-86-468887-1	—	—
18	March 29, 2023	978-4-86-468161-2	—	—
19	September 5, 2023	978-4-86-468198-8	—	—
20	March 5, 2024	978-4-86-468244-2	—	—
21	September 5, 2024	978-4-86-468287-9	—	—
22	December 26, 2024	978-4-86-805038-4; 978-4-86-805039-1 (SE)	—	—
23	May 15, 2025	978-4-86-805068-1	—	—
24	August 29, 2025	978-4-86-805107-7	—	—
25	February 5, 2026	978-4-86-805156-5	—	—
26	June 5, 2026	978-4-86-805184-8	—	—
27	November 5, 2026	978-4-86-805239-5	—	—

=== Anime ===
An anime television series adaptation was announced in June 2016. The anime series is directed by Katsuyuki Motohiro and Tatsuo Satō, with series composition by Junichi Fujisaku and animation produced by OLM, Inc., Production I.G and Signal.MD. Takahiro Yoshimatsu designed the characters and Noriyuki Asakura composed the series's soundtrack. Shinobu Tsuneki, Yoshihiro Ishimoto and Shinichi Miyazaki are responsible for mechanical design. The 12-episode series aired from April 15 to July 8, 2017, on NHK G. It was streamed by Amazon on their Amazon Prime Video service. Sentai Filmworks has licensed the series for home video and exclusively streamed the series on Amazon's Anime Strike streaming service. The opening theme song, titled "Kaidoku Funō" (解読不能; lit. "Indecipherable"), is performed by After the Rain, while the ending theme song, titled "Hikari no Hajimari" (光のはじまり; lit. "The Beginning of Light"), is performed by Yoshino Nanjō.

==== Episodes ====
No.	Title (Note: English titles are taken from Amazon Video.)	Directed by	Written by	Original release date
1	"Birth of the Mighty Atom"; Transliteration: "Tetsuwan kidō" (Japanese: 鉄腕起動)	Kaito Asakura	Junichi Fujisaku	April 15, 2017
Five years have passed since the catastrophe. Robots for reconstruction had become an indispensable part of people's lives, spurring technological development. At Lab 7 in Nerima University, Umatarō Tenma and Hiroshi Ochanomizu are struggling to install the next-generation artificial intelligence "Bewußtsein" into their new prototype, A106. However, they've already used up all their research funds, so part-time jobs are a must. Today, it was time for another part-time job at the Mecha City theme park. The two of them rush out of the lab in a hurry.
2	"Bewußtsein"; Transliteration: "Bevusutozain" (Japanese: ベヴストザイン)	Takahiro Natori	Junichi Fujisaku	April 22, 2017
A regular debriefing is held at the graduate school of Nerima National University. Umatarō Tenma and Hiroshi Ochanomizu are also present at this important meeting, which decides the budget of the laboratories. As they listen to the reports of the other laboratories, the rivalry between Umatarō and the innocent Hiroshi burns. While the two were away from Lab 7, there were figures sneaking in there. One of them is Ochanomizu's sister, Ran. The other is Motoko, the younger sister of Moriya Tsutsumi, the genius of lab 1. There is another big shadow creeping in as well.
3	"Pursuing the Respective Leads"; Transliteration: "Sorezore no tsuiseki" (Japanese: それぞれの追跡)	Satoshi Kuwabara	Bun-O Fujisawa	April 29, 2017
A suspicious man arrives at Lab 7. It was Kensaku Ban, a handyman named "Maruhige." Kensaku was looking for the pet robot, Marron, on request. Motoko also shows up and suggests that they hire Umatarō and Hiroshi as part-timers and use A106. However, Kensaku argues that investigating is a job that only humans can do, and opposes using A106 to search for the robot. He decides to compete with A106.
4	"Welcome to Nerima U Festival"; Transliteration: "Neri taisai e yōkoso" (Japanese: 練大祭へようこそ)	Tomohiro Matsukawa	Shigeru Morita	May 6, 2017
Nerima University's school festival, the "Nerima U Festival," begins. Umatarō and Hiroshi's Lab 7 also sets up a stall at the outskirts of the refreshment booth street. Since they can't pay for the parts of A106 with their part-time jobs, they decide to make some money by setting up a booth. Making udon noodles were the A10 series robots from Lab 7. Hiroshi and A106 went out with Ran to promote the Lab 7 udon. The robots work diligently, but for some reason, A105 is nowhere to be found.
5	"Step on it! Maruhige Shipping"; Transliteration: "Gekisō Maruhige unsō" (Japanese: 激走マルヒゲ運送)	Fumio Maezono	Atsuhiro Tomioka	May 13, 2017
Tenma and Ochanomizu came along with A106 to work part-time at Maruhige Shipping, a company headed by the detective Maruhige. After seeing A106, President Maruhige insists that he can't trust a robot with no heart to do his job. However, when an urgent moving request comes in from a major customer lady, Maruhige decides to put Tenma, Ochanomizu, and A106 to work. When Tenma and Ochanomizu arrive on the scene, they find Motoko waiting for them.
6	"Lab 7's Annihilation!"; Transliteration: "7-ken kaimetsu su!" (Japanese: 7研壊滅す！)	Yūki Arie	Junichi Fujisaku	May 20, 2017
Motoko is still trying to figure out how to approach Ochanomizu. Just then, Ochanomizu bursts out of Lab 7, having had a fight with Tenma over the repair of A106. Ochanomizu is angry with Tenma, and Moriya from lab 1 approaches him and invites Ochanomizu to join him. Seeing this situation, Motoko asks Ochanomizu why he is doing research with Tenma. Ochanomizu begins to talk about his encounter with Tenma.
7	"Ran and Princess Teru"; Transliteration: "Ran to TERU hime" (Japanese: 蘭とTERU姫)	Hiromichi Matano	Shigeru Morita	June 3, 2017
Ochanomizu's younger sister, Ran, is a member of the robotics research club at Tokyo Metropolitan Sanpōji High School. The robotics club is going through a trial and error process before participating in the robot contest. However, creating a humanoid robot is difficult, and the members of the club, except for Ran, feel lost. Then Ochanomizu, an alumnus of the club, comes over and gives advice to the members who are worried that they are slowing Ran down. Finally, the day of the robot contest arrives.
8	"Robot Wrestling"; Transliteration: "Roboresu" (Japanese: ロボレス)	Tomohiro Matsukawa	Atsuhiro Tomioka	June 10, 2017
Tenma and Ochanomizu enter A106 into the robot wrestling tournament. Ochanomizu, seeing the robot wrestling for the first time, is stunned by the fierce battle. On the other hand, Tenma is as confident as ever, believing their A106 will not be defeated. A106's first round opponent was Mojican Vasso. Even though it is the first generation of remote-controlled units, its power is not to be underestimated. In addition, the owner of Mars, Dr. Lolo, was sure to be there. Amidst the tension, the match was about to begin.
9	"Six is Unfit to Fight"; Transliteration: "Shikkusu sentō funō" (Japanese: シックス戦闘不能)	Fumio Maezono	Bun-O Fujisawa	June 17, 2017
A106's ability to shut down his opponent's functions without damaging him was an impressive feat, and the audience and contestants alike went wild at the sight of this fully autonomous thinker. However, A106's body was severely damaged. The dipole regulator that supports the body had burned out. Ochanomizu, Shunsaku, and Motoko rush around looking for replacement parts. Dr. Lolo is also quietly watching the scene.
10	"Battle Royale"; Transliteration: "Batoru roiyaru" (Japanese: バトルロイヤル)	Hiromichi Matano	Shigeru Morita	June 24, 2017
The finals would be held in a battle royale format. Dr. Lolo, the owner of the defending champion Mars, made an unexpected proposal that shocked the Robot Wrestling audience. Dr. Lolo declared that Mars would be the one to defeat all the rivals who entered the tournament under the same conditions. Ran watches A106 recharge as the crowd goes wild. The final match begins at last.
11	"A Dialogue"; Transliteration: "Taiwa" (Japanese: 対話)	Naoki Matsuura	Atsuhiro Tomioka	July 1, 2017
The battle royale-style Robot Wrestling finals begin. Only the autonomous robots, A106 and Mars, remain. A106 accurately dodges Mars's quick attacks and performs a boost jump, but Mars also avoids it. When Tenma saw this, he shouted that Mars was different from the others and that if A106 didn't finish him off quickly, he would be torn apart like the others. Just as Ochanomizu was sharing his concern, A106 begins talking to Mars wirelessly, asking him to respond.
12	"Beginning"; Transliteration: "Biginingu" (Japanese: ビギニング)	Tatsuo Satō	Junichi Fujisaku	July 8, 2017
When A106 reboots, Ochanomizu shows him the victory trophy for the Robot Wrestling tournament. The flashbacks of the Robot Wrestling tournament come back to A106's memory, and various other memories come back to A106 one after another. A106 is slowly being repaired, and something is about to awaken within him.

== See also ==
- Rideback, a manga series illustrated by Tetsuro Kasahara
