= Soraru =

Japanese male singer (born 1988)

Soraru そらる
- Born: November 3, 1988 (age 37); Miyagi Prefecture, Japan
- Genres: J-Pop, Anison, Vocaloid, utaite
- Occupations: Singer; Songwriter; Audio engineer
- Years active: 2008–present
- Labels: EXIT TUNES (2012); Virgin Music (2016-2023); Pony Canyon (2024-Present)
- Member of: After the Rain
- Website: そらる Official Website

YouTube information
- Channel: そらる / soraru
- Subscribers: 1.2 million
- Views: 441 million
- Last updated: 3 March 2026

Soraru (Japanese: そらる, Hepburn: Soraru; born 3 November 1988) is a Japanese male utaite singer and songwriter. He is a member of the music unit After the Rain and is a co-founder of the virtual Youtuber agency, Neo-Porte.

The origin of his name is from the word Sora because he likes to look at the sky and the intonation is the same as panda. In addition, he has said his real name also contains the kanji character for "sky" (空).

== Biography ==
Soraru was born on 3 November 1988 in Miyagi Prefecture, Japan. He started activities on Niconico in 2008 and began posting videos on YouTube in 2015. His CD release in addition to video posting, Niconico live broadcasting, live activities, etc. In 2016, he co-founded Cielkocka alongside a friend. He is affiliated with the company as a support artist, entrusting the company with management and production for his activities. In 2021, he co-founded the virtual YouTuber agency “Neo-Porte” with Crazy Raccoon CEO Ojiji, VTuber Shibuya Haru and singer-songwriter Mafumafu.

== Discography ==
=== Limited Single ===
	Date Released	Title	Music label	Standard
1st	May 3, 2019	Eye fake me	Virgin Music	Digital Download

=== Single ===
	Date Released	Title	Music label	Highest Ranks
1st	November 28, 2018	銀の祈誓 (Gin no kisei)	Virgin Music	2
2nd	March 6, 2019	ユーリカ (Eureka)	Virgin Music	3

=== Album ===
==== Solo Album ====
	Date Released	Title	Music label	Highest Ranks
1st	June 6, 2012	そらあい (Sora Ai)	Virgin Music	7
2nd	April 22, 2015	夕溜まりのしおり (Yū tamari no shiori)	Subcul-rise Record	10
3rd	July 19, 2016	ビー玉の中の宇宙 (Bee Tama no naka no uchū)	Virgin Music	223
4th	July 17, 2019	ワンダー (Wonder)	Virgin Music	2
5th	September 29, 2021	ゆめをきかせて (Yume o kikasete)	Virgin Music	5
6th	February 12, 2025	ユメトキ (Yumetoki)	Pony Canyon	5

==== Mini Album ====
	Date Released	Title	Music label
1st	November 8, 2017	夢見るたまごの育て方 (Yumemiru tama go no sodate-kata)	Virgin Music
2nd	October 1, 2022	創空とメルヒェン讃歌 (Sō sora to Meruhyen sanka)	Cielkocka

=== Collab Album ===
	Date Released	Title	Collab with	Music label
1	January 16, 2011	Space Ship	Shonen T	Celo Project
2	November 19, 2014	音ギ話劇場 (Oto gi-banashi gekijō)	YASUHIRO	Celo Project
3	July 21, 2017	Reverse in Wonderland	YASUHIRO	Universal Music Japan
