= Luz (singer, born 1993) =

Japanese musical artist (1993–2025)

Background information
- Born: Kōji Tatewaki; July 23, 1993; Fukui Prefecture, Japan
- Died: August 19, 2025 (aged 32)
- Genres: J-pop; rock; anime song
- Occupations: Singer
- Years active: 2010–2025
- Label: Exit Music Publishing Inc. (Pony Canyon) (2014–2024)
- Website: luz-web.com

Kōji Tatewaki (Japanese: 帯刀光司; July 23, 1993 – August 19, 2025), also known professionally as Luz, was a Japanese singer. He released five original albums and two singles, and he was leader of the unit Royal Scandal and organizer for the XYZ Tour.

== Early life ==
Luz was born in Fukui Prefecture, Japan, on July 23, 1993. He was born to a Japanese father and a mother who is of American, German, and Filipino descent—his grandmother was Filipino and his grandfather was American and German. He was part of a light music club in high school, choosing to be a vocalist instead of a guitarist because the club lacked vocalists.

== Career ==
He made his music debut in 2010 by publishing videos on Nico Nico Douga, and rose in popularity through live events. His stage name "Luz" came from a suggestion from a livestream chat after he suggested one with 光, a kanji within his real name.

His first album, tWoluz, was released in 2014. In 2015, he released two versions of Labyrinth; the "White" edition charted at #3 on the Oricon Albums Chart. He made his first tour, Genesis, in 2016. In 2017, he released his third album Reflexión, and toured with it. In June 2018, Luz released his first single, "Sister", which was the ending song for the anime Cutie Honey Universe, and held a Sister tour that year.

He formed the unit Royal Scandal with Kanon69 and Rahwia, and they made their debut with the album Q&A -Queen and Alice- in December 2019. He was also organizer for the XYZ Tour, which in 2019 had an All Night Nippon 0 edition at Yokohama Arena. Also in 2019, he performed on the solo Fanatic tour.

In January 2021, Luz released the single "Rose", which he wrote himself. In October 2021, he released Faith. In 2021, he had his fifth and sixth solo tours, Eleven and Faith. His song "Kakuriyo" was the opening song for the 2023 anime adaptation of Dark Gathering.

On January 30, 2024, Pony Canyon announced that it had terminated its contract with Luz after he was arrested for possession and use of illegal drugs. After the guilty verdict, he issued a public apology.

== Personal life and death ==
Luz's fan mark was the rose, which he adopted after learning that his fans were already using it to represent him. He cited singer-songwriter Yasu as a major influence. He owned a ragdoll cat named Rei-kun (レイくん).

Luz died on August 19, 2025, aged 32; the announcement by his agency said his death was "sudden" but gave no further details. His Luz Anniversary Live XI concert had been planned for August 31.

== Discography ==
=== Albums ===
No.	Released	Title
1st	October 1, 2014	tWoluz
2nd	October 7, 2015	Labyrinth -black-
2nd	October 7, 2015	Labyrinth -white-
3rd	June 28, 2017	Reflexión
4th	October 27, 2021	Faith

=== Singles ===
No.	Released	Title
1st	June 20, 2018	"Sister"
2nd	January 27, 2021	"Rose"
