= Tomohisa Sako =

Japanese singer (born 1991)

- Also known as: Tomohisa, Syounen T (少年T, Shōnen T)
- Born: December 26, 1991 (age 34); Sapporo, Hokkaido, Japan
- Origin: Japan
- Genres: pop
- Occupation: Singer-songwriter
- Instruments: Vocals, guitar
- Years active: 2009–present
- Labels: SME Records, Celo Project, Sambafree inc., Sacra Music, Avex Trax
- Website: sakotomohisa.com

Tomohisa Sako (佐香 智久, Sakō Tomohisa; born December 26, 1991, Sapporo, Hokkaido) is a Japanese singer. He has several singles and albums that have charted on the Oricon charts, including "Zutto", which reached at number 12 on the Oricon Singles Chart, and "Kimi Koi Calendar", which peaked at number 13, both in 2012. His album Hajimemashite reached at number 27 on the Oricon Albums Chart.

== Discography ==
=== Studio album ===
List of albums, with selected chart positions
Title	Album details	Peak positions	
Title	Album details	JPN	TWN East Asian (Note: Position was taken from 2014 week 50 for Hajimemashite..)
Hajimemashite. (はじめまして。; "How Do You Do.")	Released: February 27, 2013; Label: SME Records; Formats: CD, CD/DVD, digital download	27	7
Boku kara Kimi e (僕から君へ; "From Me to You")	Released: July 22, 2015; Label: SME Records; Formats: CD, CD/DVD, CD/Blu-ray, digital download	16	—

=== Extended plays ===
List of albums, with selected chart positions
Title	Album details	Peak positions
Title	Album details	JPN
Spaceship	Independent release collaboration, as Soraru x Shounen T (そらる×少年T); Released: January 16, 2011; Label: Celo Project; Formats: CD	—
Promise	Independent release as Tomohisa.; Released: February 9, 2011; Label: Sambafree inc.; Formats: CD	49

=== Singles ===
List of singles, with selected chart positions
Title	Year	Peak chart positions			Album
Title	Year	Oricon Singles Charts	Billboard Japan Hot 100 (Note: The Japan Hot 100 was established in February 2008.) (Note: Sources for chart positions are as follows: "Zutto", "Hanbunko", "Kimi Koi Calendar", "Bye Bye", "Colorful World", "Mahō no Yoru to Fushigi na Waltz", "Getta Banban".)	TWN East Asian (Note: Position was taken from 2012 week 17 for "Aikotoba," 2012 week 28 for "Zutto," 2013 week 49 for "Colorful World.")	Album
"Ai Kotoba" (愛言葉; "Words of Love")	2012	16	— (Note: Charted at number 18 on the Hot Single Sales chart.)	17	Hajimemashite.
"Zutto" (ずっと; "Forever")	2012	12	34	11	Hajimemashite.
"Hanbunko" (はんぶんこ; "Half")	2012	28	52	—	Hajimemashite.
"Kimi Koi Calendar" (君恋カレンダー; "Calendar of Loving You")	2012	13	77	—	Hajimemashite.
"Bokutachi no Uta" (僕たちの歌; "Our Song")	2013	17	— (Note: Charted at number 7 on the Hot Animation chart and number 16 on the Hot Single Sales chart.)	—	Hajimemashite.
"Bye Bye" (バイバイ, Baibai)	2013	25	58	—	Boku Kara Kimi e
"Colorful World" (カラフルワールド, Karafuru Wārudo)	2013	31	57	12	Boku Kara Kimi e
"Mahō no Yoru to Fushigi na Waltz" (魔法の夜と不思議なワルツ; "A Magical Night and a Strange Waltz")	2014	31	57	—	Boku Kara Kimi e
"Shōnen to Robot" (少年とロボット; "Boy and Robot")	2014	48	— (Note: Charted at number 40 on the Hot Single Sales chart.)	—	Boku Kara Kimi e
"Getta Banban" (ゲッタバンバン)	2015	19	39	—	Boku Kara Kimi e
