= Urashimasakatasen =

Japanese music group

- Origin: Japan
- Years active: 2013-present
- Labels: JVCKenwood Victor Entertainment (2016); NBCUniversal Entertainment Japan (2017-2025); Warner Music Japan (2025-present)
- Members: Uratanuki; Shima; Tonari no Sakata; Senra
- Website: nbcuni-music.com/urashimasakatasen/

Urashimasakatasen (Japanese: 浦島坂田船, Hepburn: Urashimasakatasen) is a male Japanese music group consisting of four members, Uratanuki, Shima, Tonari no Sakata (Aho no Sakata) and Senra. The group's name was created from a combination of the members' names. They are mainly active on YouTube.

The band formed in 2013; they began by posting singing videos on video sites. In 2015, they made their CD debut with the release of the mini album Hajimari no Aizu (はじまりの合図). In 2016, they released the album Cruise Ticket from music label JVCKenwood Victor Entertainment and made a major debut. The 5th (3rd major) album V-enus released in 2018, The albums both topped the Oricon and Billboard Japan music charts. In 2019, they won a gold disc with the album $HUFFLE, and their next release L∞VE (2021) topped the Oricon a few days after its initial release.

== Members ==
- Uratanuki (うらたぬき) – Leader group, Vocalist, Voice acting
- Shima (志麻) – Vocalist, Voice acting
- Tonari no Sakata (となりの坂田。) – Vocalist, Voice acting
- Senra (センラ) – Vocalist

== Discography ==
=== Albums ===
Title	Year	Album details	Peak position
Cruise Ticket	2016	Released: March 23, 2016; Label: Victor Entertainment; Formats: CD, CD+DVD, digital download; Track listing: 1. Pathfinders; 2. Idol poi kyoku o tsukutta 3. Koshitantan; 4. Breriko; 5. Okocha ma sensō 6. Shiawase wa daihon no soto kara 7. Notebook love 8. Super hero 9. Iroko; 10. Dreamer; 11. Mermaid; 12. Deai ga nai!; 13. Fire◎Flower; 14. Shoutër	5
Four the C	2017	Released: July 5, 2017; Label: NBCUniversal; Formats: CD, CD+DVD, digital download; Track listing: 1. Sailor's High; 2. Kami no manimani 3. Kin'yōbi no ohayō 4. Ghost rule 5. Reach; 6. Recoup; 7. NO DRIVE, NO LIFE; 8. Slumber number 9. Princess ni kuchidzuke wo 10. Chōshō Polaroid; 11. SHOW MUST GO ON!!; 12. Summertime Record; 13. Carry Forward	4
V-enus	2018	Released: July 4, 2018; Label: NBCUniversal; Formats: CD, CD+DVD, digital download; Track listing: 1. Starry Cruise; 2. Nen ni ichiya no koi moyō 3. Peacock Epoch; 4. Brikino Dance; 5. Life goes on 6. Spill; 7. School boy 8. Make a pass 9. Yumemidori; 10. Galaxy; 11. Romeo; 12. Waifu ai Nōzō boy 13. Secret base ~ Kimi ga kureta mono ~ 14. Sora ni, hirari	1
$huffle	2019	Released: June 26, 2019; Label: NBCUniversal; Formats: CD, CD+DVD, digital download; Track listing: 1. Poker fake 2. Fortune!!; 3. Game Changer; 4. Beetle Battle; 5. No.1 Girl; 6. CRAZY BUNNY!!; 7. Mikansei Utopia; 8. Freja; 9. Trip-Trap, Love Trap!!; 10. Kessen zen'ya 11. Tōkyō Summer session 12. ROULETTE; 13. ARK; 14. Makoto -Live for Justice-; 15. Hanafubuki	2
Rainbow	2020	Released: November 25, 2020; Label: NBCUniversal; Formats: CD, CD+DVD, digital download; Track listing: 1. RAINBOW; 2. Aokunurikaero!; 3. Saikyō Drive!!; 4. Bishō, kaori, kimitoboku o tsunagu 5. Red hot Crazy night 6. YELLOW FINEST; 7. GET UP; 8. Shiun no tsubasa 9. Meido; 10. Sweet Magic; 11. VS; 12. Fighting Summer Carnival; 13. Whale Hole; 14. Coco Mademoiselle	3
L∞ve	2021	Released: July 7, 2021; Label: NBCUniversal; Formats: CD, CD+DVD, digital download; Track listing: 1. Sekai de ichiban suki na namae 2. Save Me; 3. SWEET TASTE PRESENT; 4. Cinderella Step; 5. Tsukiyo; 6. Colors; 7. Tokyo Deadman's Wonderland; 8. Aranami; 9. Sugary; 10. Shougai Raibaru; 11. Aozora Picasso; 12. Wannabe Queen Bee; 13. Furanma; 14. Boohoo; 15. Scissor Knife; 16. Goodbye; 17. Starry Heaven; 18. PIRATES A GO GO	1
Toni9ht	2022	Released: July 6, 2022; Label: NBCUniversal; Formats: CD, CD+DVD, digital download; Track listing: 1. Piece Piece Piece; 2. Yoni Game; 3. Shalala; 4. Hon'nō zenkai zorezorezore!; 5. Mada; 6. Izayoi Night fever 7. Yume no monomane 8. DREAM BABY; 9. Docchi tsukazu LOVERS; 10. Ride The Night; 11. Hidoi Hydra; 12. Dekiai; 13. Nibiiro Wheels; 14. Nagareboshi nante iranai 15. Boku no Cinderella; 16. Encore	1
Plusss	2023	Released: July 12, 2023; Label: NBCUniversal; Formats: CD, CD+DVD, digital download	3
Weddiing	2024	Released: July 10, 2024; Label: NBCUniversal; Formats: CD, CD+DVD, digital download	2
Warn12g	2025	Released: June 25, 2025; Label: Warner Music Japan; Formats: CD, digital download	2
Ta13oo	2026	Released: July 1, 2026; Label: Warner Music Japan; Formats: CD, digital download	4

=== Doujin albums ===
#	Date released	Title	Music label
1	December 31, 2015	はじまりの合図 (Hajimari No Aizu)	Urashimasakatasen
2	August 21, 2016	Memory Log	Urashimasakatasen

=== Singles ===
#	Release date	Title	Music label	List of music	Highest rank
1	April 26, 2017	SHOW MUST GO ON!!	NBCUniversal Entertainment Japan	3 Songs CD: 1. SHOW MUST GO ON!!; 2. 花鳥風月 (Kachofugetsu); 3. 百花繚乱 (Hyakkaryoran); Bonus CD Voice drama Urashimasakatasen Quest	8
1	April 26, 2017	SHOW MUST GO ON!!	NBCUniversal Entertainment Japan	4 Songs CD: 1. SHOW MUST GO ON!!; 2. 花鳥風月 (Kachofugetsu); 3. 百花繚乱 (Hyakkaryoran); 4. SHOW MUST GO ON!!(Instrumental)	8
2	August 28, 2019	明日へのBye Bye (Ashita e no Bye Bye)	NBCUniversal Entertainment Japan	4 Songs CD: 1. 明日へのBye Bye (Ashita e no Bye Bye); 2. シンプルLOVE (Simple Love); 3. アワ・ダンサー (Awa Dancer); 4. 合戦(Gassen); Bonus CD: 1. Voice drama Moero! Supo ne ? Urashima Sakata fune	4
2	August 28, 2019	明日へのBye Bye (Ashita e no Bye Bye)	NBCUniversal Entertainment Japan	5 Songs CD: 1. 明日へのBye Bye (Ashita e no Bye Bye); 2. シンプルLOVE(Simple Love); 3. アワ・ダンサー (Awa Dancer); 4. 合戦 (Gassen); 5. 明日へのBye Bye (Ashita e no Bye Bye) (Instrumental)	4
3	December 25, 2019	Gotcha!!	NBCUniversal Entertainment Japan	4 Songs CD: 1. Gotcha!!; 2. 共鳴コントラスト (Kyomei contrast); 3. 4 REAL IN ACTION!!!!; 4. ハングリー・ゴースト (Hungry Ghost); Bonus CD: 1. Voice drama Urashima Sakata fune no hi joe duel master Hen	4
3	December 25, 2019	Gotcha!!	NBCUniversal Entertainment Japan	5 Songs CD: 1. Gotcha!!; 2. 共鳴コントラスト (Kyomei contrast); 3. 4 REAL IN ACTION!!!!; 4. ハングリー・ゴースト (Hungry Ghost); 5. Gotcha!! (Instrumental)	4

=== DVD&Blu-ray ===
#	Date released	Title	Music label
1	unknown	浦島坂田船SUMMER TOUR	Urashimasakatasen

== TV anime series ==
They received their own short anime series titled, Urashima Sakata sen no nichijō (浦島坂田船の日常, lit. Everyday of Urashimasakatasen) which was broadcast on Tokyo MX. The anime is an original story about Urashimasakatasen's youth following their transfer into a high school. Each member voices their own character.
