= List of Oreimo light novels =

The Oreimo series of light novels is written by Tsukasa Fushimi with accompanying illustrations by Hiro Kanzaki. It follows the story of Kyosuke Kosaka as he learns that his younger sister, Kirino Kosaka, with whom he has had a distant relationship for years, has been living a secret life as an otaku. Now he acts as her confidant and the series follows Kyosuke's efforts to help his sister to reconcile her personal life with her secret hobbies, while restoring their broken relationship and coming to terms with their true feelings for each other.

The first volume was published on August 10, 2008, by ASCII Media Works's imprint Dengeki Bunko, and as of September 10, 2021, 17 volumes have been published.

== Volume list ==
No.	Title	Release date	ISBN
1	My Little Sister Can't Be This Cute; Ore no Imōto ga Konna ni Kawaii Wake ga Nai (俺の妹がこんなに可愛いわけがない)	August 10, 2008	978-4-04-867180-4
2	My Little Sister Can't Be This Cute (2); Ore no Imōto ga Konna ni Kawaii Wake ga Nai (Ni) (俺の妹がこんなに可愛いわけがない(2))	December 10, 2008	978-4-04-867426-3
3	My Little Sister Can't Be This Cute (3); Ore no Imōto ga Konna ni Kawaii Wake ga Nai (San) (俺の妹がこんなに可愛いわけがない(3))	April 10, 2009	978-4-04-867758-5
4	My Little Sister Can't Be This Cute (4); Ore no Imōto ga Konna ni Kawaii Wake ga Nai (Yon) (俺の妹がこんなに可愛いわけがない(4))	August 10, 2009	978-4-04-867934-3
5	My Little Sister Can't Be This Cute (5); Ore no Imōto ga Konna ni Kawaii Wake ga Nai (Go) (俺の妹がこんなに可愛いわけがない(5))	January 10, 2010	978-4-04-868271-8
6	My Little Sister Can't Be This Cute (6); Ore no Imōto ga Konna ni Kawaii Wake ga Nai (Roku) (俺の妹がこんなに可愛いわけがない(6))	May 10, 2010	978-4-04-868538-2
7	My Little Sister Can't Be This Cute (7); Ore no Imōto ga Konna ni Kawaii Wake ga Nai (Nana) (俺の妹がこんなに可愛いわけがない(7))	November 10, 2010	978-4-04-870052-8
8	My Little Sister Can't Be This Cute (8); Ore no Imōto ga Konna ni Kawaii Wake ga Nai (Hachi) (俺の妹がこんなに可愛いわけがない(8))	May 10, 2011	978-4-04-870486-1
9	My Little Sister Can't Be This Cute (9); Ore no Imōto ga Konna ni Kawaii Wake ga Nai (Kyū) (俺の妹がこんなに可愛いわけがない(9))	September 10, 2011	978-4-04-870813-5
10	My Little Sister Can't Be This Cute (10); Ore no Imōto ga Konna ni Kawaii Wake ga Nai (Jyū) (俺の妹がこんなに可愛いわけがない(10))	April 10, 2012	978-4-04-886519-7
11	My Little Sister Can't Be This Cute (11); Ore no Imōto ga Konna ni Kawaii Wake ga Nai (Jyūichi) (俺の妹がこんなに可愛いわけがない(11))	September 10, 2012	978-4-04-886887-7
12	My Little Sister Can't Be This Cute (12); Ore no Imōto ga Konna ni Kawaii Wake ga Nai (Jyūni) (俺の妹がこんなに可愛いわけがない(12))	June 7, 2013	978-4-04-891607-3
13	My Little Sister Can't Be This Cute (13) Ayase IF (Part 1); Ore no Imōto ga Konna ni Kawaii Wake ga Nai (Jyūsan) Ayase Ifu Jyō (俺の妹がこんなに可愛いわけがない(13)あやせif 上)	August 10, 2019	978-4-04-893285-1
14	My Little Sister Can't Be This Cute (14) Ayase IF (Part 2); Ore no Imōto ga Konna ni Kawaii Wake ga Nai (Jyūshi) Ayase Ifu Ge (俺の妹がこんなに可愛いわけがない(14)あやせif 下)	June 10, 2020	978-4-04-912896-3
15	My Little Sister Can't Be This Cute (15) Kuroneko IF (Part 1); Ore no Imōto ga Konna ni Kawaii Wake ga Nai (Jyūgo) Kuroneko Ifu Jyō (俺の妹がこんなに可愛いわけがない(15)黒猫if 上)	September 10, 2020	978-4-04-913270-0
16	My Little Sister Can't Be This Cute (16) Kuroneko IF (Part 2); Ore no Imōto ga Konna ni Kawaii Wake ga Nai (Jyūroku) Kuroneko Ifu Ge (俺の妹がこんなに可愛いわけがない(16)黒猫if 下)	March 10, 2021	978-4-04-913436-0
17	My Little Sister Can't Be This Cute (17) Kanako IF; Ore no Imōto ga Konna ni Kawaii Wake ga Nai (Jyūnana) Kanako Ifu (俺の妹がこんなに可愛いわけがない(17) 加奈子if)	September 10, 2021	978-4-04-913445-2

== See also ==
- List of Oreimo characters
- List of Oreimo episodes
