= Kazuma Miki =

Japanese light novel editor

- 三木一馬
- Born: September 12, 1977 (age 48); Tokushima prefecture, Japan
- Education: Sophia University
- Occupations: Editor, writer
- Writing career
- Genres: Fiction, light novel
- Website: Official website

Kazuma Miki (三木一馬, Miki Kazuma; born September 12, 1977) is a Japanese light novel editor. He is CEO of Straight Edge Inc, editor-in-chief of LINE novel, and outside director of Egg Firm. He is from the Tokushima prefecture. He graduated from Sophia University as a physics major.

== Overview ==
After graduating from the Faculty of Science and Engineering at Sophia University, Miki joined Media Works (the predecessor of the current Kadokawa ASCII Media Works brand) in 2000, and was assigned to the editorial department of Dengeki Bunko in 2001.

After serving as editor-in-chief of Dengeki Bunko and Dengeki Bunko Magazine, he left Kadokawa on March 31, 2016, and established Straight Edge Inc on April 1, 2016, but continues to work for Dengeki Bunko as an external editor.

In February 2020, Miki began posting his original fiction on the website Shōsetsuka ni Narō.

He is a close friend of YouTuber Kunhiro and often appears in his videos.

== Notable authors under his supervision ==
- Nekotarou Aizome – Tōkyō Soul Wizards
- Shun Ayasaki – Sōkyū Shigure, Hatsuko Suisei, Toiki Yukiiro, The Noble Children Series
- Yūsaku Igarashi – Nogizaka Haruka no Himitsu
- Hitoma Iruma – Usotsuki Mii-kun to Kowareta Maa-chan, Ground Control to Psychoelectric Girl, The Lizard King
- Masaki Okayu – Bludgeoning Angel Dokuro-Chan
- Yomoji Otono – Minutes
- Kazuma Kamachi – Heavy Object, A Certain Magical Index
- Reki Kawahara – Accel World, Sword Art Online
- Tsukasa Kōzuki – Ladies versus Butlers!
- Tsutomu Satō – The Irregular at Magic High School
- Yasichiro Takahashi – A/B Extreme, Shakugan no Shana, Kanae no Hoshi
- K-Ske Hasegawa – Ballad of a Shinigami
- Kazuho Hyōdō – S-CRY-ED New Order, S-CRY-ED After
- Tsukasa Fushimi – Jūsanbanme no Alice, Oreimo, Eromanga Sensei, Neko Sis
- Rin Yuuki – Varukyuria no Kikō
- Eiji Mikage – The Empty Box and Zeroth Maria, Anata ga Naku made Fumu no wo Yamenai!
- Rakuda – Oresuki

== Involvement in the industry ==
Miki believes in selling original works through media franchising in hopes to appeal to markets outside traditional publishing. As such, many of the works he supervised have had manga and anime adaptations.

In the initial draft of Shakugan no Shana, the titular protagonist Shana was in her twenties and resembled Margery Daw, another character in the series, in appearance, however following Miki's suggestions, the character was reworked.

The concept of Oreimo as a slice of life comedy based on otaku culture was planned by Miki based on the style of the author, Tsukasa Fushimi. Kirino Kosaka, the main heroine of the series, was proposed by Miki as like "a gyaru character taken from the works of Tooru Fujisawa." As a native of Tokushima, he often appears at Machi Asobi which is held in Tokushima City, along with Fushimi.

== Bibliography ==
- Omoshirokereba Nandemoari Hakkō Ruikei 6000 Manbu -- Toaru Henshū no Shigoto Mokuroku (面白ければなんでもあり 発行累計6000万部――とある編集の仕事目録) (Illustrated by abec, published by Kadokawa, 2016, ISBN 9784048657150)

== Other credits ==
=== Anime ===
Miki has been credited as a producer in all anime adaptations of series he was editor of, such as the Sword Art Online anime series. In addition to this, he has also been credited in:

- Ittadaki no e Katētan – Script Writer
- Nogizaka Haruka no Himitsu – DVD Episode 4 Audio Commentary

=== Games ===
- Oreimo Portable – Manami Tamura's Route Supervising Director
- Toaru Majutsu to Kagaku Gunsou Katsugeki – Supervising Director
- Tokyo Cronos – Producer
