= List of Oreimo episodes =

Cover art of the first BD compilation released by Aniplex, featuring main characters Kirino (left) and Kyosuke Kosaka (right)

The Japanese anime television series Ore no Imōto ga Konna ni Kawaii Wake ga Nai, also known as Oreimo, is based on the light novel series of the same name, written by Tsukasa Fushimi, with illustrations provided by Hiro Kanzaki. It is directed by Hiroyuki Kanbe and produced by the animation studio AIC Build and production company Aniplex. Kana Ishida and Tetsuya Kawakami are the chief animators, and the main character designer is Hiroyuki Oda. The screenplay was written by Hideyuki Kurata, with Tsukasa Fushimi writing episode nine. Composed by Satoru Kōsaki, the music is produced by Aniplex with Satoshi Motoyama as the sound director. The story depicts high school student Kyosuke Kosaka who discovers that his standoffish younger sister Kirino is actually an otaku with an extensive collection of moe anime and younger sister-themed eroge she has been collecting in secret. Kyosuke quickly becomes Kirino's confidant for her secret hobby.

The series aired 12 episodes between October 3 and December 19, 2010, on the Tokyo MX television station. It aired at later dates on BS11, Chiba TV, MBS, TV Aichi, TVH, TVK, TV Saitama, and TVQ. Aniplex USA began streaming and simulcasting the series in North America through Anime News Network (ANN) under the shortened name Oreimo, but security issues involving the illegal leaking of episode two online resulted in the stream being placed on hold. The stream of Oreimo returned to ANN with the first four episodes on November 8, 2010. The series was released on eight BD/DVD compilation volumes, with two episodes each, between December 22, 2010, and July 27, 2011.

Four original net animation episodes were streamed through the official website, as well as several other websites such as Nico Nico Douga, Showtime Japan, and MovieGate, beginning February 22, 2011, with each succeeding episode to be shown in one month intervals up until May 31, 2011. They were later released in the final two BD/DVD volumes on June 27, 2011, for volume seven and July 27, 2011, for volume eight. These episodes feature a break in the original story arc starting at episode 12 and offer an alternate ending from the TV broadcast. An English-subtitled DVD box set, containing both the broadcast and ONA episodes, was released in North America by Aniplex of America in October 2011.

A 13-episode second anime season, titled Ore no Imōto ga Konna ni Kawaii Wake ga Nai. (俺の妹がこんなに可愛いわけがない。) (with a period at the end), aired between April 7 and June 30, 2013. The series is produced by the same staff as the first season, albeit at A-1 Pictures. An additional three episodes were streamed worldwide on August 18, 2013.

The first season makes use of 13 pieces of theme music: one opening theme and 12 ending themes. The opening theme for the anime is "Irony" sung by ClariS and composed by Kz of Livetune, while each episode features a different ending theme sung by one of the voice actors. The second season's opening theme is "Reunion" by ClariS, while a contest was held for the second season's ending themes.

== Episode list ==
=== Oreimo (2010–2011) ===
No.	Title	Ending theme	Original air date
1	"There's No Way I Could Love My Sister"; Transliteration: "Ore ga Imōto to Koi o Suru Wake ga Nai" (Japanese: 俺が妹と恋をするわけがない)	"Imōto, Plea~se!" (妹プリ〜ズ!, Imōto Purīzu!; "Little Sister, Plea~se!") by Ayana Taketatsu	October 3, 2010
After bumping into his little sister, Kirino, in the hall, Kyosuke Kosaka finds a magical girl anime DVD which contains a little-sister themed eroge (erotic game) inside. Kyosuke soon learns the game belongs to Kirino and confronts her about it, though says she would not be weird for having such a hobby and would offer his advice any time. Later that night, Kirino brings Kyosuke into her room, where she reveals her secret stash of erotic games and anime, explaining that she loves little sister types, though is unable to explain how she got into it. Having not had anyone to share her hobby with, Kirino gets Kyosuke, who promises to keep her obsession a secret from their parents, to play through one of her eroge for an unbiased opinion.
2	"There's No Way I'd Go to an IRL Meetup with My Sister"; Transliteration: "Ore ga Imōto to Ofu Kai ni Iku Wake ga Nai" (Japanese: 俺が妹とオフ会に行くわけがない)	"Shine!" by Ayana Taketatsu	October 10, 2010
Noticing Kirino has no one to share her hobbies with, Kyosuke asks for advice from his friend, Manami Tamura, who suggests that she make some otaku friends. Kirino joins an online community and is invited to an otaku tea party at a maid café in Akihabara, but has trouble talking to any of the other members. However, she is later asked to join members Saori Vageena and Kuroneko, the latter of which gets into a heated debate with her about their favorite anime. After a day of shopping around Akihabara, they decide to keep sharing messages while Kyosuke finishes the game Kirino asked him to complete.
3	"There's No Way My Little Sister Can Be This Cute"; Transliteration: "Ore no Imōto ga Konna ni Kawaii Wake ga Nai" (Japanese: 俺の妹がこんなに可愛いわけがない)	"Horaism" (ほらいずむ, Horaizumu) by Ayana Taketatsu	October 17, 2010
Kirino hangs out with Saori and Kuroneko again and is surprised to find that they do not have to worry about hiding their hobbies. Later that day, Kirino's father learns of her hobby and becomes angry at her. Kirino becomes upset that her hobby has been called "worthless" and runs off, prompting Kyosuke to catch up with her. After seeing Kirino show no desire to give up a part of her life, Kyosuke stands up to his father for her. Though he allows Kirino to keep her hobby, he still shows concern for the eroge Kirino had been seen with, so Kyosuke claims they are his, earning him a punch in the face. Kirino later gives her thanks to Kyosuke, who is taken aback by her unexpected cuteness.
4	"There's No Way My Little Sister Would Go To Summer Comiket"; Transliteration: "Ore no Imōto ga Natsu Komi Toka Iku Wake ga Nai" (Japanese: 俺の妹が夏コミとか行くわけがない)	"White Heart" (白いココロ, Shiroi Kokoro) by Saori Hayami	October 24, 2010
When Kirino forces Kyosuke to play a beat-em-up eroge, he asks Saori for some playing advice. While Kirino has her school friends over, she receives a package from Saori, unaware it is a collection of erotic dōjinshi, forcing Kyosuke to stop her from opening it in front of her regular friends, but his attempts to protect it from her land them in an even more awkward situation. Afterwards, one of Kirino's friends, Ayase Aragaki, apologizes to Kyosuke on Kirino's behalf and exchanges phone numbers with him. As way of apology for the incident, Kirino forces Kyosuke to take her to Summer Comiket, along with Saori and Kuroneko. When a special data disc Kirino wants is sold out, Kuroneko wins it for her in a beat-em-up contest. Just as they leave the Comiket, they are spotted by Ayase.
5	"There's No Way My Little Sister's Friend Can Be This XX"; Transliteration: "Ore no Imōto no Shin'yū ga Konna Batsubatsu na Wake ga Nai" (Japanese: 俺の妹の親友がこんなＸＸなわけがない)	"Orange" (オレンジ, Orenji) by Ayana Taketatsu	October 31, 2010
When Ayase suspects Kirino is hiding something, she puts pressure on her and eventually discovers her hobby, telling her they can no longer be friends. Noticing Kirino falling into despair, Kyosuke resumes his life counseling duties and tries talking to Ayase, who says she wants to make up with her, but cannot accept her hobby having seen reports of crimes relating to eroge. Kyosuke asks for advice from his father, who helps him by giving the full story on those reports. Although Ayase still refuses to make up with Kirino after Kyosuke reveals the truth behind the news story, Kirino gains the courage to stand up to her and expresses her love for both her friends and eroge. When Ayase still has doubts about her hobby, Kyosuke puts on a bold act, which causes Ayase to hate him. However, Ayase realizes that her fight with Kirino is pointless in comparison and apologizes to Kirino for her harsh words. Shortly after, Kyosuke receives a text from Ayase thanking him for helping her and Kirino make up, though warns him not to do anything indecent to Kirino.
6	"There's No Way My Childhood Friend Can Be This Cute"; Transliteration: "Ore no Osananajimi ga Konna ni Kawaii Wake ga Nai" (Japanese: 俺の幼馴染がこんなに可愛いわけがない)	"Bangs☆" (マエガミ☆, Maegami☆) by Satomi Satō	November 7, 2010
At school, Manami invites Kyosuke over to her house to try out some sweets made by her family's shop for a Halloween event. One of Kyosuke's friends points out that he and Manami are very close, but Kyosuke denies there is anything romantic; however, he admits he would not allow any guy to go out with her. Later at Manami's house, Kyosuke tries out the sweets made by Manami and ends up helping her family prepare for the event; he agrees to spend the night. Manami's grandpa tricks them into sharing the same room that night, which prompts them to talk. Kyosuke reveals to Manami that if he was confessed to, he would reject the confession in order to maintain his peaceful lifestyle. Meanwhile, back at the Kosaka house, Kirino is noticeably frustrated that Kyosuke is staying over at Manami's house.
7	"There's No Way My Little Sister Can Write a Novel"; Transliteration: "Ore no Imōto ga Konna ni Shōsetsuka na Wake ga Nai" (Japanese: 俺の妹がこんなに小説家なわけがない)	"Masquerade!" by Kana Hanazawa	November 14, 2010
Having read Kuroneko's fanfiction online, Kirino decides to write some of her own. The two of them get into a fight concerning their literature tastes. After Kirino posts her novel online, she receives a tentative publishing offer. In order to get inspiration for her next novel, Kirino drags Kyosuke around the city on Christmas Eve. She manages to get Kyosuke to buy her some earrings, claiming that they were for emotional support. When Kyosuke claims that Kirino is doing this simply for her own self-gratification, she pours a bucket of cold water over her head to prove otherwise. They stop by a hotel so Kirino can shower and change her clothes. Out on the streets again, Kyosuke feels closer to Kirino as he notices her warm smile while wearing the earrings that he bought her.
8	"There's No Way My Little Sister Could Get an Anime"; Transliteration: "Ore no Imōto ga Konna ni Anime-ka na Wake ga Nai" (Japanese: 俺の妹がこんなにアニメ化なわけがない)	"Chameleon Daughter" (カメレオンドーター, Kamereon Dōtā) by Hitomi Nabatame	November 21, 2010
While Kirino's novel becomes increasingly popular, her editor reveals that it may be adapted into an anime. Overjoyed, she invites Saori and Kuroneko with her to the anime staff meeting. However, she is shocked at the number of changes the anime staff requested, most notably changing the lead protagonist from female to male. Kirino collapses from exhaustion after returning home, so Kyosuke takes Kirino's place at the next meeting in order to plead her case. During the meeting, Kyosuke begs the anime staff to reconsider Kirino's decisions, with Kuroneko also providing her opinions, both for and against. After some back and forth, the anime staff finally agree to some of their requests. On the train ride home, Kyosuke tells Kuroneko and Saori to keep his involvement a secret from Kirino. Kuroneko questions Kyosuke's dedication to his sister and then expresses envy at having older siblings. Later, Kirino tells Kyosuke that the next life counseling will be the last.
9	"There's No Way My Little Sister Can Play Eroge Like This"; Transliteration: "Ore no Imōto ga Konna ni Erogē Zanmai na Wake ga Nai" (Japanese: 俺の妹がこんなにエロゲー三昧なわけがない)	"'Cause I Love You!" (好きなんだもん!, Suki Nanda mon!) by Ayana Taketatsu	November 28, 2010
Kirino gets a long awaited eroge in the post and spends the entire day playing it, despite some frustration in the beginning when one character is cold towards her. Unfortunately for Kyosuke, who is trying to study in the next room, Kirino gets really interactive with the eroge. Meanwhile, Kuroneko stays at home and tends to her little sister, who is a Meruru fan. Elsewhere, Saori plans for a maid-themed party for Kirino and Kuroneko.
10	"There's No Way My Little Sister Can Cosplay Like This"; Transliteration: "Ore no Imōto ga Konna ni Kosupure na Wake ga Nai" (Japanese: 俺の妹がこんなにコスプレなわけがない)	"No, Tom Has Learned Sexual Arousal for His Little Sister" (いいえ、トムは妹に対して性的な興奮をおぼえています, Iie, Tomu wa Imōto ni Taishite Seiteki na Kōfun o Oboete imasu) by Yukari Tamura	December 5, 2010
After Kirino gets annoyed with her for not understanding certain aspects of her hobby, Ayase asks Kyosuke to give her advice on a present she can give her to make up with her. After shopping around with Kuroneko and Saori for ideas, Kyosuke learns of a cosplay contest offering a rare Meruru figurine for the winner. With Ayase objecting to cosplaying, they manage to trick her model friend, Kanako Kurusu, into cosplaying as Meruru for the contest. However, when they spot Kirino in the audience, Kyosuke has to make sure Kanako does not spot her. Kanako manages to put on a winning performance and win the prize and, despite the disgust she felt towards the otaku fans, admits that she had fun while doing it.
11	"There's No Way My Little Sister Can Be a Maid"; Transliteration: "Ore no Imōto ga Konna ni Meido na Wake ga Nai" (Japanese: 俺の妹がこんなにメイドなわけがない)	"Akihabara☆Dance☆Now!!" (アキハバラ☆だんす☆なう!!, Akihabara☆Dansu☆Nau!!) by Ayana Taketatsu, Kana Hanazawa and Hitomi Nabatame	December 12, 2010
After running into her at the supermarket, Kyosuke invites Manami over to his house to help him make lunch. However, Kirino is not too pleased with having Manami around and makes various plans to hamper her visit, ranging from giving her arduous tasks to laying embarrassing pornographic traps in Kyosuke's room. Later, Saori holds a "personal harem party" for Kyosuke with Kirino, Kuroneko and herself dressed as maids. There, Kuroneko shows off a perverted manga with characters based on Kirino and Kyosuke, and later even starts calling him "nii-san" much to the ire of Kirino. Kyosuke has a small outburst at Kirino for her behavior, until she gives him a present, saying she is grateful for all his help. It is later revealed that the present was one of Kirino's favorite sis-con games.
12 (TV)	"There's No Way My Little Sister's Life Advice Can End Like This (Good End)"; Transliteration: "Ore no Imōto no Jinsei Sōdan ga Kore de Owaru Wake ga Nai -Good End-" (Japanese: 俺の妹の人生相談がこれで終わるわけがない ～GOOD END～♥)	"I'm Home." (ただいま。, Tadaima.) by Ayana Taketatsu	December 19, 2010
One morning, Kyosuke is surprised to find Kirino behaving politely to him. That evening, while Kyosuke worries about whether she is forcing an act in front of everyone, Kirino uses her final life counseling session to ask Kyosuke to buy her an eroge that is launching at midnight in Akihabara. As Kyosuke gets in line, he runs into his classmate, Kouhei Akagi, who is buying a yaoi eroge for his own sister. Meanwhile, Kuroneko calls Kirino about the cat ears she is making for her and also tells Kirino that she might be going to change "her way of calling" Kyosuke. After Kyosuke gets back home with the game, Kirino asks him to play with her. Later that night, Kyosuke learns that Kirino plans to leave home for America in the morning for track and field training, which disappoints him since she never told him about it before. Kirino becomes enraged when Kyosuke does not show the behavior she expected of him and beats him up. The next morning, Kirino decides not to go, and later also announces to Kyosuke her life counseling is not over yet, which makes Kyosuke happy.
12 (ONA)	"There's No Way My Little Sister's Life Advice Can End Like This (True Route)"; Transliteration: "Ore no Imōto no Jinsei Sōdan ga Kore de Owaru Wake ga Nai -True Route-" (Japanese: 俺の妹の人生相談がこれで終わるわけがない TRUE ROUTE)	"Ready" by Ayana Taketatsu	February 22, 2011 (ONA)
One morning, Kyosuke is surprised to find Kirino behaving politely to him. That evening, while Kyosuke worries about whether she is forcing an act in front of everyone, Kirino uses her final life counseling session to ask Kyosuke to buy her an eroge that is launching at midnight in Akihabara. As Kyosuke gets in line, he runs into his classmate, Kouhei Akagi, who is buying a yaoi eroge for his own sister. Meanwhile, Kuroneko calls Kirino about the cat ears she is making for her and also tells Kirino that she might be going to change "her way of calling" Kyosuke. Kyousuke, after realizing that the trains are no longer running, manages to convince one of the other customers to lend him his bike so he can ride back home. After Kyosuke gets back home with the game, Kirino asks him to play with her. She then shows him all of the medals and report cards with bad grades she had received throughout the years. The next morning, Kyosuke learns that Kirino has left home for America for track and field training, leaving him to wonder about the night before and why she never told him about her departure. In the beginning of the new school term, Kyosuke meets up with Kuroneko, who would be attending his school as his underclassman.
13	"There's No Way My Junior Can Be This Rotten"; Transliteration: "Ore no Kōhai ga Konna ni Kusatteru Wake ga Nai" (Japanese: 俺の後輩がこんなに腐ってるわけがない)	"†Inochi Mijikashi Koiseyo Otome†" (†命短し恋せよ乙女†) by Kana Hanazawa	March 29, 2011 (ONA)
As Kuroneko, whose real name is revealed to be Ruri Gokō, enrolls in Kyosuke's school, Saori feels a bit downhearted that she has not heard from Kirino. Kyosuke notices that Ruri is having trouble making friends due to her personality. Kyosuke and Ruri decide to take a look at the Games Research club, which is run by Gennosuke Miura, the guy Kyosuke had borrowed the bike from, and they eventually decide to join. As Kyosuke and Manami try their best to help Ruri, Ruri accuses Kyosuke of treating her like a replacement for Kirino. A welcoming party is held at the club, where Kyosuke meets Kōhei's younger sister, Sena Akagi, who goes a little crazy when her obsession with yaoi is revealed and she accidentally reveals her perverted fantasies to the rest of the club, forcing Kyosuke to call up Kōhei to calm her down. At the end of the day, Kyosuke admits that, despite feeling lonely without Kirino, he will not stop helping out Ruri, which makes her feel a bit happier.
14	"There's No Way My Junior Can Be This Cute"; Transliteration: "Ore no Kōhai ga Konna ni Kawaii Wake ga Nai" (Japanese: 俺の後輩がこんなに可愛いわけがない)	"Serenade of Atonement" (贖罪のセレナーデ, Shokuzai no Serenāde) by Kana Hanazawa and Yuichi Nakamura	April 26, 2011 (ONA)
Ruri and Sena are asked to work together to create a game for an online contest, with Kyosuke supervising them. After thinking about his options, Kyosuke suggests that they make an eroge. As the girls pitch their concepts, Ruri comes up with an expansive novel-based game, mentioning how she wants to do it in order to show Kirino up. Sena then gets upset when her concept is rejected due to its explicit hardcore yaoi themes and stops coming to the club, leaving Kyosuke and Ruri to work on their game alone. Just as Kyosuke and Ruri start to warm up to each other, several bugs show up in the game's code which the club cannot get fixed in time for the contest's deadline, so Ruri begs Sena to help her out, realising it's okay to lean on others sometimes. Working together, they manage to finish the game, which ends up winning the "Worst Game Award".
15	"There's No Way This Is My Little Sister's Last Episode"; Transliteration: "Ore no Imōto ga Kore de Saishūkai na Wake ga Nai" (Japanese: 俺の妹がこれで最終回なわけがない)	"keep on runnin" by Ayana Taketatsu	May 31, 2011 (ONA)
As Ruri and Sena's game is bashed on the internet, they decide to work harder towards making a better game. As Kyosuke prepares to go home, he receives a text from Kirino telling him to throw away her collection of eroge and anime goods. Kyosuke contacts Ayase, who reveals Kirino has not been in contact with her since she left either. Kyosuke then meets up with Ruri, who reveals her heartfelt thanks for helping her fit into school and encourages Kyosuke to fly to America to find the root of Kirino's problem, giving him a kiss on the cheek as he goes. Arriving in Los Angeles, Kyosuke meets up with Kirino at her track camp and plays eroge with her, cheering her up as she has not had time to play her collection. Kirino reveals that she had wanted to challenge herself and be more independent, saying she would not contact anyone until she managed to beat someone in a time trial, which she has not been able to do. Kyosuke tells Kirino that he is lonely without her and asks her to come back to Japan, which encourages Kirino to beat her elementary school roommate in a race and go home with him, reuniting with her friends and her anime.

=== Oreimo 2 (2013) ===
No.	Title	Ending theme	Original air date
1	"My Little Sister Can't Come Back Home Again"; Transliteration: "Ore no Imōto ga Futatabi Kaettekuru Wake ga Nai" (Japanese: 俺の妹が再び帰ってくるわけがない)	"Kanjō-sen Loop" (感情線loop) by Ayana Taketatsu ("Reunion" by ClariS in the television broadcast)	April 7, 2013
While Kirino organizes things with school and friends following her return from America, Kyosuke grows concerned that she might start ignoring him again due to the way he forced her to come back. At the same time, he struggles to find the meaning behind the kiss Ruri gave him when he went to retrieve her. Later, Kirino once again calls upon Kyosuke for life consultation, having him take her to Akihabara to watch a trailer for the next Meruru season before engaging in a long-missed shopping expedition she spent the entire night planning. As thanks for his help, and to celebrate a year of life consultation, Kirino gives one of her eroge purchases to Kyosuke to play.
2	"The Big Brother I Trusted and Sent Off Can't Get This Addicted to a Mobile Dating Sim and Commit Sexual Harassment"; Transliteration: "Shinjite Okuridashita Onii-san ga Keitai Bishōjo Gēmu ni Dohamari shite Sekuhara shite Kuru yō ni Naru Wake ga Nai" (Japanese: 信じて送り出したお兄さんが携帯美少女ゲームにドハマリしてセクハラしてくるようになるわけがない)	"Filter" (フィルター, Firutā) by Saori Hayami	April 14, 2013
Feeling frustrated that Kirino is ignoring her in favour of a popular mobile game called Love Touch that lets you exchange texts with virtual girls, Ayase asks Kyosuke to do something about it. After Kyosuke brings it up to Kirino, she gives him Love Touch to avoid being tempted by it, only for Kyosuke to end up becoming addicted himself. As Ayase becomes angered upon learning of this from Manami, Kyosuke attempts to explain how the game's heroine is similar to Ayase. He suggests imitating the heroine to better hold Kirino's interest, but this is soon met with violent backlash from Ayase when dubious phrases are brought up. After Ayase goes to Manami for advice, Kyosuke is shown the error of his ways when Ayase decides to imitate the game's yandere route in front of Kirino.
3	"My Friend Can't Take Off Her Glasses"; Transliteration: "Ore no Tomodachi ga Megane o Hazusu Wake ga Nai" (Japanese: 俺の友達が眼鏡を外すわけがない)	"Zutto..." (ずっと...; Always...) by Hitomi Nabatame, Ayana Taketatsu and Kana Hanazawa	April 21, 2013
As Kyosuke, Kirino and Ruri decide to visit Saori's apartment as a surprise for her birthday, they finally see what she looks like without glasses. Four years ago, Saori was a weak bodied girl who was shy about showing her face to others. One evening, she was brought by her older sister, Kaori, to a special apartment where she indulges in otaku activities alongside her flatmates, Shinya Sanada and a budding manga artist named Kanata Yamanashi. Kanata took an instant liking towards Saori and soon taught her about the otaku lifestyle. However, the circle soon starts to dwindle after Kaori left to get married, leaving Saori alone once more. Feeling betrayed by Kaori, Saori became determined to start her own circle and help others like she helped her, receiving her trademark swirly glasses from Kanata to help her on her way. This would eventually lead to the start of her otaku life and her meeting with Kirino and Ruri. Back in the present, Kaori, Kanata and the rest of the old gang also show up to check up on Saori's new friends. After Kanata reminds Saori to pass down her glasses once she doesn't need them anymore, Saori begins her birthday party.
4	"My Little Sister's Rival Can't Come to Japan"; Transliteration: "Ore no Imōto no Raibaru ga Rainichi suru Wake ga Nai" (Japanese: 俺の妹のライバルが来日するわけがない)	"Honest Rhapsody" (ほねすと☆ラプソディー, Honesuto Rapusodī) by Ayana Taketatsu	April 28, 2013
Kirino's track rival from her time in America, Ria Hagry, comes to Japan and stays over at her house. Kirino feels a bit protective of her, often dishing out punishment at Kyosuke following every little misunderstanding. Kirino and Kyosuke take Ria to Akihabara to show her Kirino's various hobbies. Afterwards, Ria challenges Kirino to a race, understanding what drove her to beat her back in America. Although Kyosuke cheers Kirino on, Ria manages to beat her, feeling proud of getting her revenge. Before leaving Japan, Ria hints to Kyosuke that he is the reason Kirino works so hard, though Kyosuke is a bit skeptical of that. After Ria leaves, Kirino brings up an odd request for Kyosuke to be her 'boyfriend'.
5	"I Can't Be My Little Sister's Boyfriend and My Little Sister Can't Have a Boyfriend"; Transliteration: "Ore ga Imōto no Kareshi na Wake ga Naishi, Ore no Imōto ni Kareshi ga Iru Wake ga Nai" (Japanese: 俺が妹の彼氏なわけがないし、俺の妹に彼氏がいるわけがない)	"Keep" by Ayana Taketatsu	May 5, 2013
Kirino asks Kyosuke to pretend to be her boyfriend whilst they meet with a company director, Misaki Fujima. Misaki wants Kirino to work abroad as one of their exclusive models, forcing Kirino to have Kyosuke to act as her boyfriend as a reason not to leave. As such, they end up going on a 'date' together in order to keep up the act in case Misaki is spying on them, which proves more awkward when Manami sees them together. Whilst stopping at a place to eat, they encounter Kanako and her model acquaintance, Bridget Evans, and are forced to act in front of them too. Things become even more awkward when they encounter Ruri at the arcades. At the end of the day, Kirino becomes disappointed by Kyosuke's behaviour, saying she'll use a 'real boyfriend' next time. After Kyosuke clears things up with Ruri and hears her thoughts, he asks Kirino directly if she has a boyfriend, only to receive a cryptic response. Later, the gang get together at Summer Comiket and put out a collaborative doujinshi which, to Ruri's surprise, manages to sell out. Whilst visiting the industry booths afterwards, they end up encountering a curious male acquaintance of Kirino's.
6	"There's No Way My Sister Would Bring Her Boyfriend Home!"; Transliteration: "Ore no Imōto ga Ie ni Kareshi o Tsuretekuru Wake ga Nai" (Japanese: 俺の妹が家に彼氏をつれてくるわけがない)	"Monochrome☆HAPPY DAY" (モノクロ☆HAPPY DAY, Monokuro Happy Day) by Kana Hanazawa	May 12, 2013
The boy is introduced to be Kouki Mikagami, a designer from Misaki's company who, to Kirino's surprise, is also an otaku. Later, after Kyosuke explains the 'fake date' scenario to Ayase and asks her opinion on whether Kirino has a boyfriend, things get tense at the after-party when Kirino witnesses Ruri assumedly confessing to Kyosuke. Irritated, Kirino announces that Kouki is her boyfriend, pushing Ruri to leave and angering Kyosuke with her remarks. Later, Kyosuke becomes irritated when Kirino invites Kouki to their house, receiving an angered slap from her when he shows his distaste. After speaking with a drunken Daisuke, Kyosuke grovels before Kirino, explaining his honest feelings and stating he won't allow Kirino to date Kouki until he proves himself worthy. Kirino eventually breaks down and reveals she lied about dating Kouki because she was jealous of Kyosuke and Ruri, with Kouki agreeing to pretend to be her boyfriend. As the two siblings make up and decide to redo the party, Ruri finally asks Kyosuke to go out with her.
7	"I Can't Become A Couple With My Underclassman"; Transliteration: "Ore ga Kōhai to Koibito Dōshi ni Naru Wake ga Nai" (Japanese: 俺が後輩と恋人同士になるわけがない)	"Kyō mo Shiawase" (きょうもしあわせ; Happy Today) by Yui Ogura	May 19, 2013
With Kyosuke unable to give her a straight answer, Ruri asks that he give her his response after the party the next day. Speaking with both Kirino and Manami, they both tell him to think over this decision carefully. During the party, Kyosuke thinks back on the past year after he began his life counselling with Kirino, whilst also taking an opportunity to tease her. After the party, Kyosuke agrees to go out with Ruri, officially making them a couple. As Kyosuke becomes stressed over how to act like a proper boyfriend, he brings Kouki along with him to the Games Research club, where the other members claim that they always knew Kyosuke and Ruri liked each other, and are surprised to learn that they decided to go out just recently. After being given some time alone, Ruri admits she has also been stressing about how to act in front of Kyosuke and simply asks that they go on a date.
8	"I Can't Create a Summer Memory with My Underclassman"; Transliteration: "Ore ga Kōhai to Hito Natsu no Omoide o Tsukuru Wake ga Nai" (Japanese: 俺が後輩とひと夏の思い出を作るわけがない)	"Setsuna no Destiny" (刹那のDestiny; Destiny of Moment) by Kana Hanazawa	May 26, 2013
While being treated by Kirino after getting his face wounded by some reason, Kyosuke reveals to her that he and Ruri decided to start dating, and much to his surprise, she does not complain about it. In their first date, Ruri wears a special cosplay she designed specially for the occasion, much to Kyosuke's astonishment. As the day pass, Ruri shows more about her tastes and preferences to Kyosuke and she reveals that it was written in a special guidebook made by her in order to attain her wish, which according to her is to have him and Kirino get on terms with each other. Despite not understanding the meaning behind her plans, he agrees to help her with it. The two then spend the following days hanging out together at their houses, with Kyosuke being introduced to her younger sisters in the occasion, and by the end of summer break, they go to a festival together. Knowing that school is to resume in a few days, Kyosuke claims to Ruri that he will always treasure the moments they passed together during the summer, while she is about to take the next step of her guidebook, which is to break up with him.
9	"My Little Sister Can't Be This Cute!"; Transliteration: "Ore no Imōto ga Konna ni Kawaii Wake ga Nai!" (Japanese: 俺の妹がこんなに可愛いわけがない！)	"Answer" by Ayana Taketatsu (none in the television broadcast)	June 2, 2013
After hearing no word from Ruri following their alleged break up, Kyosuke is shocked to learn from Sena that Ruri has transferred schools, later finding her house completely vacated. Troubled by this, Kyosuke comes to Kirino, who gives him his own life counselling and decides to help him search for her in a hot spring town. After they eventually manage to find her, Ruri points out that Kirino hadn't truly accepted her dating Kyosuke, forcing her to confess her true feelings that she didn't want him to have a girlfriend, which was the reason she passed off Kouki as her boyfriend. Kirino states that despite this, she doesn't want to see her brother cry even more than that and wants to get the two back together to repay how much he has supported her over the past year. After Ruri hears all this and a makes a curious remark towards Kyosuke before temporarily passing out, she reveals she is simply moving to a nearby town for family reasons, having only been in the town on vacation, and will still be relatively close to the others. After Kyosuke decides he is probably not ready for a girlfriend just yet, Ruri states the next stage in her plan is for her, Kyosuke and Kirino to get along with each other.
10	"My Little Sister Can't Wear a Wedding Dress"; Transliteration: "Ore no Imōto ga Uedingu Doresu o Kiru Wake ga Nai" (Japanese: 俺の妹がウエディングドレスを着るわけがない)	"Hoshikuzu Cosplay☆Witch! Desu! Omega" (星くずこすぷれ☆うぃっち！です！・おめが, Hoshikuzu Kosupure☆Witchi! Desu! Omega; lit. I'm The Stardust Cosplay☆Witch! Omega) by Misaki Kuno	June 9, 2013
After hearing about Kyosuke and Ruri's breakup, Ayase becomes irritated that it had nothing to do with her. Nonetheless, she asks Kyosuke to take up his 'manager' role once more as she asked to help out at a Meruru concert that Kanako and Bridget are participating in. After hearing Kirino will be unable to attend the concert due to her work schedule, he borrows a bike from Kouki and rushes over to pick her up. After managing to get to the concert in time for ClariS to perform, Kirino feels thankful towards Kyosuke for his efforts.
11	"Little Sisters Can't Barge In On Their Brother Who Lives Alone"; Transliteration: "Hitorigurashi no Aniki no Heya ni Imōto-tachi ga Oshikakeru Wake ga Nai" (Japanese: 一人暮らしの兄貴の部屋に妹たちが押しかけるわけがない)	"Arifureta Mirai e" (ありふれた未来へ) by Satomi Satō	June 16, 2013
Concerned by how seemingly close Kyosuke and Kirino have gotten, their parents arrange for Kyosuke to live on his own so he can focus on his exams. With Kyosuke needing to earn an A grade before he can move back, Kirino adds that if he does succeed, she'll do any one thing he asks. Later, Kanako decides to pay Kyosuke a visit in his new apartment, proving awkward when she finds an eroge Kirino lent him. She proves smart enough to guess that Kirino is his sister, but is still oblivious to her being an otaku. The next day, Ayase visits Kyosuke to deliver a housewarming present, shortly followed by Ruri, leading to an awkward and embarrassing confrontation. After Ayase takes her leave, Kyosuke and Ruri reconfirm their stance on their relationship, with Kyosuke stating he won't start dating until he settles things with Kirino.
12	"Total Angel Ayase-tan Can't Descend Upon My Place Where I Live Alone"; Transliteration: "Maji Tenshisugiru Ayase-tan ga Hitorigurashi no Orenchi ni Kōrin Suru Wake ga Nai" (Japanese: マジ天使すぎるあやせたんが一人暮らしの俺んちに降臨するわけがない)	"Omou Koto" (思うコト) by Saori Hayami	June 23, 2013
A party is held for Kyosuke at his new apartment and Kirino arrives there just to find Manami, and despite her animosity towards her brother's classmate, she decides to put it aside for his sake. Ayase, Ruri, Saori and Kanako also attend the party, but chaos ensues when they start arguing about who among them should take care of Kyosuke as he prepares himself for the mock exams and Kirino settles it by appointing Ayase to the task. The mock exams come and thanks to Ayase's support, Kyosuke manages to earn an A grade and the right to return home. As he is preparing to move back, Ayase confesses her feelings for him, but he politely declines, revealing that he is already in love with someone else. Instead of kicking him like she usually does, Ayase kisses Kyosuke on his cheek and bids farewell to him.
13	"Little Sisters Can't Fall in Love With Their Older Brothers!"; Transliteration: "Imōto ga Ani ni Koi Nante Suru Wake Nai" (Japanese: 妹が兄に恋なんてするわけない)	"Honto no Kimochi" (ホントの気持ち; True Feelings) by Ayana Taketatsu and Satomi Satō	June 30, 2013
Kirino reminisces on her childhood, when she was very fond of Kyosuke and always looked up to him, until he stopped giving his all and adopted a more relaxed lifestyle. Blaming Manami for the sudden change in him, Kirino confronted her, asking her to give back the brother she loved so much, just to hear from her that the Kyosuke she envisioned never existed in the first place. To get back at Kyosuke, Kirino focused to improve herself and started avoiding him. Years later, she starts working as a model and befriends Ayase, but also develops her otaku hobbies, and becomes too ashamed to share them with anyone else. The issues she had with her secret were what somehow reapproached her with Kyosuke, who since then always stood by Kirino's side to support and protect her, even though she no longer sees him as the brother she once idolized.
14	"I Can't Confess to Her"; Transliteration: "Ore ga Kanojo ni Kokuhaku Nante Aru Wake ga Nai" (Japanese: 俺が彼女に告白なんてあるわけがない)	"The last ceremony" by Kana Hanazawa	August 18, 2013 (ONA)
As Christmas Day draws near, Kyosuke meets with Ruri on a rainy night and rejects her after confessing his love for another girl. The next day, Kyosuke tempts Kirino out to a Christmas date in Akihabara. As their date draws to a close that night, Kirino reveals her intention of going abroad once more. This prompts Kyosuke to tell her he has fallen in love with a girl, but this upsets Kirino and causes her to run off. Kyosuke gives chase but quickly loses sight of her when at that moment Kaori, Saori and Ruri show up in a minivan; Saori apologizes for stalking their date. As the group gives chase to Kirino, Saori also reveals her and Kaori's repaired relationship. Kyosuke jumps out of the van upon spotting Kirino and begins proclaiming his love for her. As Kirino starts rebuffing Kyosuke's strange words, his true feelings are revealed when Ruri blares Kyosuke's love confession to Kirino from speakers at the back of Kaori's minivan, which she had secretly recorded during their breakup. Kyosuke publicly confirms his own words, and asks Kirino to stay in Japan and marry him, which Kirino tearfully accepts.
15	"My Little Sister Is This Cute"; Transliteration: "Ore no Imōto ga Kon'nani Kawaii" (Japanese: 俺の妹がこんなに可愛い)	"will" by Ayana Taketatsu	August 18, 2013 (ONA)
The Kosaka siblings head back to their hotel room to sort out their actions after agreeing that siblings cannot get married in real life. Here, Kyosuke gives her a ring as a Christmas present, and he puts it on her finger as a pseudo-engagement ring. Having already given thought into their next move, Kirino shares this with Kyosuke. Sometime later, the siblings formally acknowledge their relationship to Saori and Ruri before Kyosuke leaves to meet up with Kanako at her latest concert, where she confesses her love for him which he rejects. The next day, Kirino shows Kyosuke the box she had denied showing him previously and reveals its contents, including a photo album containing pictures of when they were younger. Kirino has Kyosuke listen to the diaries she had been recording since she was young, documenting the feelings she started to develop for him. Among them is a message where her younger self desperately asks for advice on how to be with Kyosuke. Afterwards, both Kirino and Kyosuke smile in that at the end, their relationship had finally been repaired.
16	"My Little Sister Can't Be This Cute."; Transliteration: "Ore no Imōto ga Kon'nani Kawaii Wake ga Nai." (Japanese: 俺の妹がこんなに可愛いわけがない。)	"Thank You" by Ayana Taketatsu	August 18, 2013 (ONA)
On the day of Kyosuke's high school graduation, he has a final reunion with the gaming club. After the graduation ceremony, Kirino arrives to pick Kyosuke up following the end of her middle school graduation, and both head out to meet Manami. As the group sit in the park, Manami becomes visibly angered upon learning of the Kosaka siblings' relationship and following Kirino's provocation, they start physically fighting. After Kyosuke breaks them up, Manami begins brutally attacking their illicit relationship while citing the damage they would cause to their social reputations. Manami ultimately confesses her love for Kyosuke and pleads with him to reconsider, but he chooses Kirino and vows to defy the societal norm to be with her, causing Manami to hit him before leaving in defeat. Afterwards, Kirino laments that Kyosuke sacrificed so much for her impossible dream, to which he contently accepts. Sometime later, the Kosaka siblings arrange a pseudo-marriage at a church, where they reveal their genuine happiness for being siblings with a kiss. Kirino gives Kyosuke back the ring, ending their relationship with her request of being a couple until graduation finally fulfilled, and they go back to being normal siblings. Shortly thereafter, Kyosuke and Kirino go to Akihabara to meet a new girl Saori recruited to her online community. As they head to the meet-up, Kyosuke casually kisses Kirino on the cheek, much to her surprise, and she states he is in for some "serious life-counselling" when they get home. As Kirino runs off, Kyosuke fondly recalls the adventure with his little sister.
