= Seiichiro Yamashita =

Japanese voice actor (born 1992)

- 山下誠一郎
- Born: May 21, 1992 (age 34); Fukuyama, Hiroshima, Japan
- Occupation: Voice actor
- Years active: 2012–present
- Agent: Office Osawa
- Height: 170 cm (5 ft 7 in)

Seiichiro Yamashita (山下誠一郎, Yamashita Seiichirō; born May 21, 1992) is a Japanese voice actor from Fukuyama, Hiroshima. He is affiliated with Office Osawa. His major roles include Kakeru Naruse in Orange, Takahiro Mizuno in Walkure Romanze, Buntarō Hōjō in Girls Beyond the Wasteland, Rekka Yukimura in Battle Spirits: Burning Soul, and Cid Kagenou / Shadow in The Eminence in Shadow.

== Biography ==
Initially, he wanted to be an actor, but since he was from Hiroshima Prefecture, even if he wanted to become an actor, there were no auditions and he was not in an environment where he could move to Tokyo. After entering high school, he made many friends, got deeply involved in anime and manga, and thought that a career as a voice actor might be interesting, which led to him aiming to become a voice actor.

After graduating from high school, he enrolled in Amusement Media Academy. After he debuted in dubbing in The Good Doctor in 2012 during his time at the school, he passed the "Internal Audition for Production Affiliation" held from January to March 2013 at the Office Osawa. In October of the same year, he made his first starring role as Takahiro Mizuno in the TV anime Walkure Romanze.

== Filmography ==
=== Anime series ===
2013

- Aikatsu! as Male
- Arpeggio of Blue Steel as Student C
- Ore no Imōto ga Konna ni Kawaii Wake ga Nai. as Staff member A (ep 10)
- Sunday Without God as Student (ep 7), Teserick (eps 10, 12)
- A Certain Scientific Railgun S as Anti-Skill B (ep 13), Bullied Man (ep 12), Thief (ep 18)
- White Album 2 as Deliveryman (ep 9)
- Walkure Romanze as Takahiro Mizuno
- Stella Women's Academy, High School Division Class C³ as College student B (ep 10)

2014

- Amagi Brilliant Park as Nick
- M3 the dark metal as Policeman A, Commandment
- Wolf Girl and Black Prince as Junya Ōno
- Gaist Crusher as Barry member
- If Her Flag Breaks as Student A, Male student, Seite ikoujita kamori
- Golden Time as Nakagawa
- Jewelpet Happiness as Schoolboy 2
- Soul Eater Not! as Clay
- Celestial Method as Student
- Nagi-Asu: A Lull in the Sea as Jin Iimori (ep 14), Hama Junior High student A (ep 16)
- Lord Marksman and Vanadis as Follower (ep 1), Soldier, Patrolman (ep 3), Hoplite (ep 5), Officer (ep 9), Aide (ep 10)
- The Irregular at Magic High School as Terrorist
- Encouragement of Climb 2nd Season as Announcer (ep 4), Firefly ghost (ep 13), Kenichi Kuraue (youth; ep 6), Mountain climber (ep 11), Mountain climber A (ep 10), Mountain hut person (ep 9), Mūma-kun (eps 1-2, 20, 24), Official (ep 21), Student (ep 15), Student B (ep 12), Taishi (ep 19), TV voice (ep 7)
- Lady Jewelpet as Prince Soarer, Police officer
- Wizard Barristers as Crime Lab Technician (ep 7)

2015

- Go! Princess PreCure as Firefighter
- Battle Spirits: Burning Soul as Yukimura Rekka
- Is It Wrong to Try to Pick Up Girls in a Dungeon? as Adventurer B
- Food Wars: Shokugeki no Soma as Male student B (ep 8), Male student C (ep 3), Schoolboy A (ep 22), Spectator C (ep 23), Staff C (ep 12)
- Ultimate Otaku Teacher as Mamoru
- Akagami no Shirayukihime as Official, Soldier B
- Shimoneta as Underwear Thief A
- Gate: Jieitai Kano Chi nite, Kaku Tatakaeri as Lancer, SDF personnel
- Comet Lucifer as Guard, Soldier
- Seraph of the End: Battle in Nagoya as Eita Kusunoki
- Mobile Suit Gundam: Iron-Blooded Orphans as Masahiro Altland, Tekkadan member

2016

- Girls Beyond the Wasteland as Buntarō Hōjō
- Haruchika as Keisuke Katagiri
- Orange as Kakeru Naruse
- Touken Ranbu: Hanamaru as Yagen Tōshirō, Aizen Kunitoshi
- Mob Psycho 100 as Mameta Inukawa, Sagawa
- Whistle! as Yoshihiko Koga (voice remake)
- The Disastrous Life of Saiki K. as Student C
- And You Thought There Is Never a Girl Online? as Cloud
- Puzzle & Dragons X as Walter
- BBK/BRNK as Dersu Nizhny
- Prince of Stride as Classmate, Cameraman

2017

- Idol Time PriPara as Shogo Yumekawa
- Katsugeki/Touken Ranbu as Yagen Tōshirō
- Hitorijime My Hero as Jirō Yoshida
- A Centaur's Life as Takamichi Koma
- Tsurezure Children as Chiaki Uchimura
- Eromanga Sensei as Chris Yamada
- Seiren as Camera kid
- Gamers! as Taiju
- Dia Horizon as Rian
- Blend S as Customer, Cool guy
- Children of the Whales as Tokusa

2018

- How to Keep a Mummy as Daichi Tachiaki
- Butlers: Chitose Momotose Monogatari as Daichi Kurosawa
- Lost Song as Henry Leobort
- Touken Ranbu: Hanamaru 2 as Yagen Tōshirō, Aizen Kunitoshi
- Forest of Piano as Mozart, Older brother of Sophie
- Hanebado! as Gaku Isehara
- 100 Sleeping Princes and the Kingdom of Dreams as Kegaremaru

2019

- The Case Files of Lord El-Melloi II: Rail Zeppelin Grace Note as Svin Glascheit
- Case File nº221: Kabukicho as James Moriarty
- Stand My Heroes: Piece of Truth as Aki Kagura
- That Time I Got Reincarnated as a Slime as Phobio

2020

- My Roomie Is a Dino as Shōta
- Appare-Ranman! as Kosame Isshiki
- The Case Files of Jeweler Richard as male clerk
- Ahiru no Sora as Rokurō Hirai
- Wandering Witch: The Journey of Elaina as Guard A

2021

- Suppose a Kid from the Last Dungeon Boonies Moved to a Starter Town as Allan Twein Lidcain
- Horimiya as Toru Ishikawa
- 86 as Raiden Shuga
- My Hero Academia Season 5 as Geten
- The Vampire Dies in No Time as Kantarō Kei
- Rumble Garanndoll as Hosomichi Kudō
- Skate-Leading Stars as Banri Mikado
- Mewkledreamy as Hanasaki
- Idolish7 as Banri's Friend
- How a Realist Hero Rebuilt the Kingdom as Gatsby Colbert
- The Fruit of Evolution as Orpheus Almond

2022

- Aoashi as Sōichirō Tachibana
- The Eminence in Shadow as Cid Kagenou / Shadow
- More Than a Married Couple, But Not Lovers as Jirō Yakuin
- Play It Cool, Guys as Kida
- My Hero Academia Season 6 as Geten
- Futsal Boys!!!!! as Satoru Usami
- Tomodachi Game as Friend A

2023

- Flaglia as Kanchi
- Sugar Apple Fairy Tale as Edmund II
- The Ancient Magus' Bride Season 2 as Rian Scrimgeour
- Edens Zero as Cure
- Ninjala as Robbit
- Insomniacs After School as Tao Ukegawa
- Horimiya: The Missing Pieces as Toru Ishikawa
- Undead Girl Murder Farce as Bernt
- The Eminence in Shadow as Cid Kagenou / Shadow
- Shangri-La Frontier as Orcelott
- Captain Tsubasa: Junior Youth Arc as Ramon Victorino
- Tokyo Revengers: Tenjiku Arc as Kakucho
- Overtake! as Jin Yuitani

2024

- Classroom of the Elite season 3 as Ikuto Kiriyama
- Chained Soldier as Male student A
- The Demon Prince of Momochi House as Hayato Hidaka
- Villainess Level 99 as Linus
- Touken Ranbu Kai: Kyoden Moyuru Honnōji as Yagen Tōshirō
- Gods' Games We Play as Ashuran
- Black Butler as Edward Midford
- Go! Go! Loser Ranger! as Eigen Urabe
- Why Does Nobody Remember Me in This World? as Ashuran
- Shoshimin: How to Become Ordinary as Yūto Hiya
- Nina the Starry Bride as Yor

2025

- From Bureaucrat to Villainess: Dad's Been Reincarnated! as Lambert Balance
- Flower and Asura as Matsuyuki Akiyama
- I Have a Crush at Work as Masugu Tateishi
- Sword of the Demon Hunter: Kijin Gentōshō as Naotsugu Miura
- Mobile Suit Gundam GQuuuuuuX as Xavier Olivette
- Sakamoto Days as Tanaka
- Shabake as Matsunosuke

2026

- Akane-banashi as Guriko Arakawa
- The Other World's Books Depend on the Bean Counter as Norbert
- Mistress Kanan Is Devilishly Easy as Yōji Kyōgi
- Dr. Stone: Science Future as Sai Nanami
- Nippon Sangoku as Jien Hibi

=== Anime films ===
- High Speed! Free! Starting Days (2015) as Yuuma Mochizuki
- Gekijōban Kyōkai no Kanata I'll Be Here (2015) as Ikaishi
- The Anthem of the Heart (2015) as Nishikori
- Harmony (2015)
- Orange: Future (2016) as Kakeru Naruse
- Black Butler: Book of the Atlantic (2017) as Edward Midford
- Happy-Go-Lucky Days (2020) as Yagasaki-kun
- Child of Kamiari Month (2021) as Snake god
- Eien no 831 (2022) as Donki
- The Eminence in Shadow: Lost Echoes (2027) as Cid Kagenou / Shadow

=== Original net animation ===
- Ore no Imōto ga Konna ni Kawaii Wake ga Nai. (2013) as Passerby
- Monster Strike (2015) as Middle schooler A
- Whistle! (2016) as Yoshihiko Koga
- Jinryoku Senkan!? Shiokaze Sawakaze (2017) as Shinpei Hoshi
- Gundam Build Divers Re:Rise (2019-2020) as Gojo
- Nocturne Boogie (2020) as Kiriya Kyuuketsu
- Idol Land PriPara (2021-2024) as Shogo Yumekawa
- Kakegurui Twin (2022) as Aoi Mibuomi
- Disney Twisted-Wonderland the Animation (2025) as Ace Trappola

=== Drama CD ===
- Kyouichi-kun to no Isshou as Kyouichi
- Like a Butterfly as Schoolboy
- Minato's Laundromat as Akira
- Ninja Slayer as Jade Sword
- Overlord as Tōkeru
- Yōkoso seiyū ryō e! 201-Gōshitsu ~ hōgen seiyū ~ as Sōta Narumi

=== Video games ===
2013

- Hakkenden: Eight Dogs of the East as Sosuke Inukawa

2014

- Oreshika: Tainted Bloodlines as Ikadzuchimaru, Asuka Ōtori
- Gundam Breaker 2 as Ruslan
- NAtURAL DOCtRINE as Nebula
- Freedom Wars as Billy "Leopard" Koller
- Koe kare ~ hōkago kimi ni ai ni iku ~ as Kaname Shitara

2015

- Atelier Sophie: The Alchemist of the Mysterious Book as Oskar Behlmer
- Touken Ranbu as Yagen Tōshirō, Aizen Kunitoshi
- Yume ōkoku to nemureru 100-ri no ōji-sama as Kalt

2016

- Girls Beyond the Wasteland as Buntarō Hōjō
- Atelier Firis: The Alchemist and the Mysterious Journey as Oskar Behlmer
- Stand My Heroes as Aki Kagura

2017

- Akane-sasu Sekai de Kimi to Utau as Hiraga Gennai

2020

- Disney: Twisted-Wonderland as Ace Trappola

2026

- Samurai Pizza Cats: Blast from the Past! as Guido Anchovy (replacing Jūrōta Kosugi)

=== Dubbing ===
- Pilgrimage (Brother Diarmuid (Tom Holland))
