= Kirino Kosaka =

Fictional character in the light novel series Oreimo

- Oreimo character
- Kirino as she appears in the manga adaptation of Oreimo
- First appearance: Oreimo volume 1 (August 10, 2008)
- Created by: Tsukasa Fushimi; Hiro Kanzaki
- Voiced by: Ayana Taketatsu
- Birthday: April 8

In-universe information
- Full name: Kirino Kosaka
- Nicknames: Kiririn; Rino
- Gender: Female
- Occupation: Student; Model; Novelist
- Relatives: Daisuke Kosaka (father); Yoshino Kosaka (mother); Kyosuke Kosaka (older brother; lover)
- Nationality: Japanese

Kirino Kousaka (Japanese: 高坂 桐乃, Hepburn: Kōsaka Kirino) is a fictional character and the main female protagonist of the light novel, anime, and manga series Oreimo, written by Tsukasa Fushimi and illustrated by Hiro Kanzaki. In the series, Kirino is a model student with excellent grades, competent athletic skill and great popularity. On the other hand, she's secretly an otaku with a fetish for "little sister"-themed eroge she has been collecting in secret. With the help of her older brother Kyousuke, who becomes her confidant, Kirino tries to reconcile her personal life with her secret hobby.

In the anime adaptation of Oreimo, Kirino is voiced by Ayana Taketatsu. Although Kirino has become an extremely popular and somewhat of a breakout character in anime and manga fandom, she still received mixed critical responses from both fans and reviewers due to the character's "hostile behavior" in the anime.

== Conception and creation ==
In September 2013, during an interview with Crunchyroll, Tsukasa Fushimi, the writer of Oreimo, was questioned why he made Kirino an otaku and he replied, "Now that I think about it, there might have been something like that going on, but originally I was only trying to make characters that I would find fun. And there is a part where I thought that by making Kirino an otaku, the viewers who are otaku could relate to her, 'Oh, I'm like that, too.'"

Regarding the character's closure in the series, Fushimi stated that there was not a completely happy ending for Kirino, revealing that he couldn't write an ending where Kirino's affection and feelings were "truly and entirely rewarded", saying that "various circumstances prevented me from plainly writing that sort of ending. Nonetheless, I realized that she cared deeply for [Kyousuke], and so I felt I had to do something for her." However, Fushimi still decided to give Kirino a happy ending, something he found very difficult to accomplish, because according to him, "I did my best to set up as good a situation for her as possible, for the sake of [Kirino's] future."

== Appearances ==
=== In Oreimo ===
In the light novel series Oreimo, Kirino is the 14-year-old younger sister of the protagonist Kyousuke. She is normally mature and independent for her age. However, this is a facade and she only reveals her true personality—immature, abusive, and ungrateful with an aggressive, tsundere-like character—to Kyousuke, whom she orders to play her games and care for the characters, only to accuse him of being a pervert and a lolicon. She is secretly an otaku with an obsession for "little sister"-themed eroge, as well as the children's anime series Stardust Witch Meruru. She works as a magazine model and later becomes a novelist, the funds from which she uses to support her hobby. Despite her interests, she states she does not know why she started liking eroge and denies having a brother complex. Nevertheless, she frequently forces Kyousuke to spend time with her, whether it is playing games or taking her out, but denies that she actually enjoys the time they spend together.

Kirino is also shown to become frustrated whenever Kyousuke is with or shows interest in other girls. She even goes so far as to sabotage his time with another girl. Despite this, she is genuinely grateful to her brother. Although she states that she only likes eroge because of their cute characters, she shows a perverted side of herself when playing those games. She uses the screen name Kiririn when with her otaku friends. She used to admire Kyousuke in the past, whom she saw as a perfect brother. Kyousuke started distancing himself from her during elementary school. Kirino once tried to chase after Kyousuke (who ran away to play with his friends) but she tripped and cried in disappointment. This spurred her to start working hard on her academics and sports. She was also severely disappointed in Kyousuke's change in personality after the incident with Akimi.

Eventually, the two siblings fall in love with each other and Kyousuke asks Kirino to marry him, which she accepts. However, immediately after that, the two agree that siblings cannot get married in real life. They then decide to be a couple only temporarily, with Kyousuke putting a ring on Kirino's finger as a pseudo-engagement ring. They later arrange a pseudo-marriage at a church, where they reveal their genuine happiness for being siblings with a kiss. Kirino gives Kyousuke back the ring, ending their relationship with the promise of being a couple only temporarily finally fulfilled, and they go back to being normal siblings.

=== In other media ===
In addition to the Oreimo series, Kirino also makes a cameo appearance in the 11th episode of the anime adaptation of Eromanga Sensei, another light novel series written by Fushimi and illustrated by Kanzaki. Kirino can be seen in the 11th episode of Haganai, although she is only shown from the back. Kirino appears in the crossover story Ore no Imōto to Railgun Collaboration Project!, which features characters from both the Oreimo and A Certain Magical Index series. Kirino makes a brief appearance in the A Certain Magical Index PSP game, and she also appears as a playable character in Dengeki Bunko: Fighting Climax.

== Reception ==
=== Popularity ===
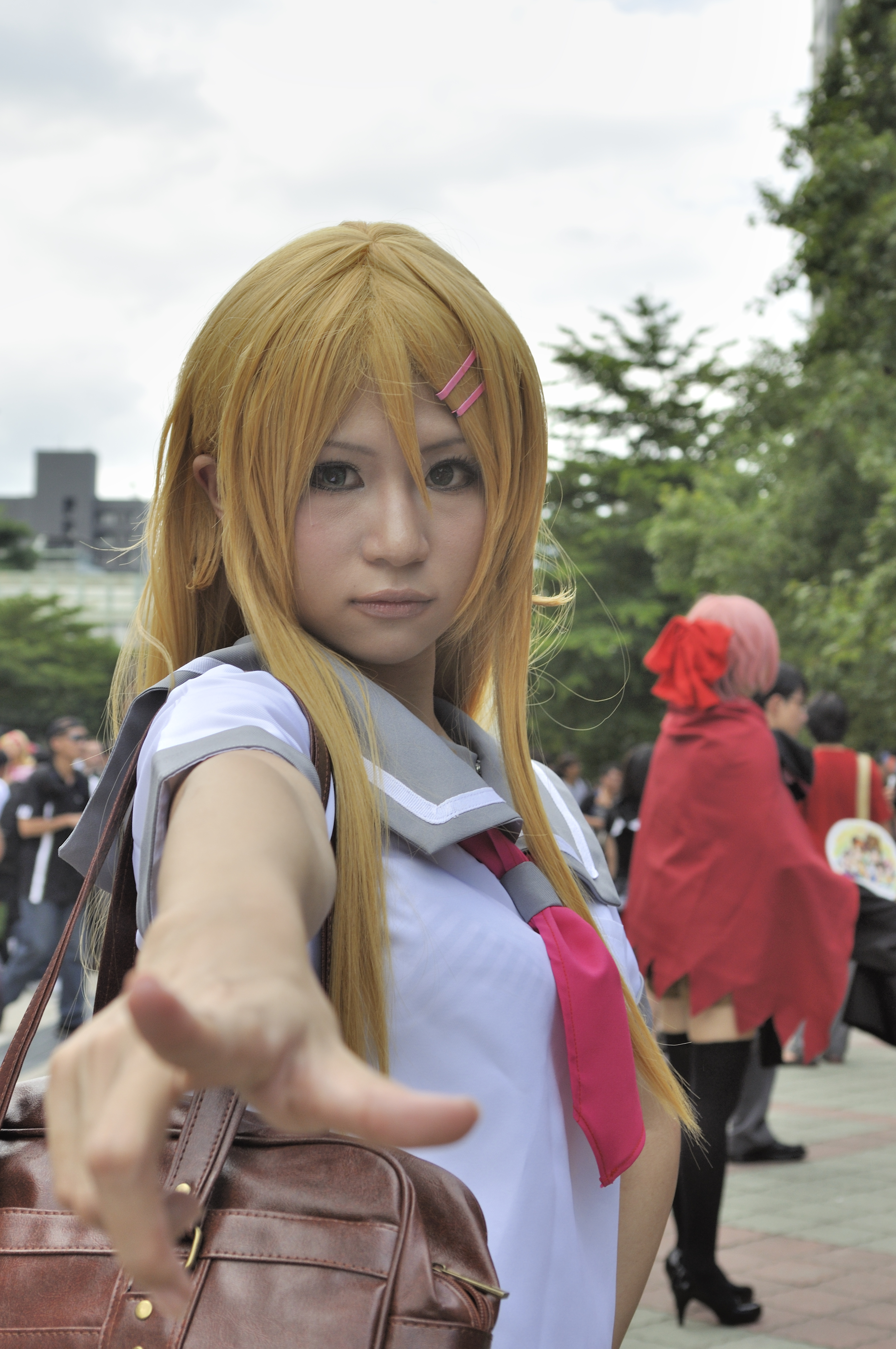
A fan cosplaying as Kirino

The character of Kirino has become extremely popular in anime and manga fandom. Since the release of the first volume of Oreimo, the pose that Kirino does on its cover has become a popular meme on internet, with several netizens editing Kirino's pose to make it look like other characters from various anime/manga series. In February 2016, the Ministry of Internal Affairs and Communications announced that it would use Kirino as spokesmodel for its teen education efforts, with Kirino appearing in informational booklets that were distributed for free at select election symposiums.

In July 2014, Kirino was voted third in the "Favorite Tsundere Anime Girl Poll" poll by 489 votes. In August 2014, Kirino was ranked 18th among the "Top 20 Meanest Characters In Anime History" by 221 votes. In June 2018, Kirino was voted fourth and third among the "5 Most Loved Snaggleteeth in Anime" and the "5 Most Hated Snaggleteeth in Anime", respectively. In May 2020, Kirino's relationship with Kyousuke ranked third on the "5 Worst Anime Relationships" list.

=== Critical response ===
In a review for Oreimo, Theron Martin of Anime News Network (ANN) compared Kirino to Nogizaka Haruka no Himitsu's character Haruka Nogizaka, commenting, "Where Haruka Nogizaka was a delicate, gentle flower of womanhood, Kirino is cut more from a tsundere mold. While the former was merely into anime series, the latter escalates dramatically to ero games (though she is also a fan of certain anime)." In a later review, Martin noted that Kirino is "still her usual irritatingly mercurial self", in addition to suggesting that Kirino's fascination with "little sister"-type ero games has a "deeper meaning". Kim Morrissy of ANN made a comparison between Kirino and Eromanga Sensei's Sagiri Izumi, with Morrissy believing that the latter, unlike Kirino, "matches the otaku's image of the ideal little sister: a quiet, doe-eyed girl who exudes moe appeal."

Reviewing for OTAQUEST, Hope Kim praised Kirino as "confident, headstrong, and knows what she wants". Kim also said, "I think the non-incest aspects to Kirino Kousaka and her sisterly fantasy that make her an appealing love interest are also worth talking about. Kirino's hobby of choice happens to be a pastime that caters to men in fiction and in real life. Thus, making her 'one of the boys.' She's cool. She's with it. She gets what it means to have a sister complex. Which in turn, makes it 'okay' for her brother Kyousuke to be into it!" UltraMunch wrote, "She may not look like it to the untrained eye, but Kirino is actually a tsundere evolution. Her character combines tsundere with the 'imouto,' or cute little sister archetype, creating an interesting new formula that had audiences thrilled until things got a bit uncomfortable towards the end there. Regardless, Kirino is the ultimate hot and cold woman with an attitude that switches so fast it can give you whiplash."

Tim Jones of THEM Anime Reviews strongly criticized Kirino by describing her as being "immensely unlikable", apart from also calling her an "abusive, unfunny creep", as the character's behavior in the anime becomes more hostile as it progresses, remarking that "[t]here is no absolutely no avoiding her selfish, haughty, jackass ways". Another reviewer of THEM Anime Reviews, Allen Moody, gave his opinion on how Kirino was the "scariest" part of the second season of the anime.

== See also ==
- List of Oreimo characters
