= Watashi no Hatsukoi wa Hazukashisugite Dare ni mo Ienai =

Japanese light novel series

- First light novel volume cover

私の初恋は恥ずかしすぎて誰にも言えない
- Genre: Romantic comedy
- Light novel
- Written by: Tsukasa Fushimi
- Illustrated by: Hiro Kanzaki
- Published by: ASCII Media Works
- Imprint: Dengeki Bunko
- Original run: January 10, 2024 – present
- Volumes: 3
- Manga
- Written by: Tsukasa Fushimi
- Illustrated by: Jako
- Published by: Hakusensha
- Imprint: Young Animal Comics
- Magazine: Young Animal
- Original run: March 8, 2024 – November 14, 2025
- Volumes: 4

Watashi no Hatsukoi wa Hazukashisugite Dare ni mo Ienai (私の初恋は恥ずかしすぎて誰にも言えない; "My First Love Is So Embarrassing, I Can't Tell Anyone") is a Japanese light novel series written by Tsukasa Fushimi and illustrated by Hiro Kanzaki. The series began publication under ASCII Media Works' Dengeki Bunko imprint on January 10, 2024. A manga adaptation illustrated by Jako was serialized in Hakusensha's Young Animal magazine from March 2024 to November 2025.

== Characters ==
Chiaki Yasumi (八隅 千秋, Yasumi Chiaki)
The protagonist who became a girl upon entering high school.
Kaede Yasumi (八隅 楓, Yasumi Kaede)
Chiaki's twin sister who has a cool personality.
Yūko Yasumi (八隅 夕子, Yasumi Yūko)
Chiaki and Kaede's older sister, who is a mad scientist.
Mei Nishiarai (西新井 メイ, Nishiarai Mei)
Chiaki's childhood friend and a popular student in their class.

== Media ==
=== Light novels ===
No.	Japanese release date	Japanese ISBN
1	January 10, 2024	978-4-04-915441-2
2	May 10, 2024	978-4-04-915590-7
3	November 8, 2024	978-4-04-915856-4

=== Manga ===
No.	Japanese release date	Japanese ISBN
1	October 29, 2024	978-4-592-16437-1
2	February 28, 2025	978-4-592-16438-8
3	July 29, 2025	978-4-592-16439-5
4	January 29, 2026	978-4-592-16440-1
