= Snaggletooth =

Snaggletooth may refer to:

- A protruding, broken or misaligned tooth; a crooked tooth.
- Yaeba, an atypical form of fang-like human canine teeth, trendy in Japan.
- "Snaggletooth", a 1984 song by English rock band Motörhead from No Remorse
- Snaggletooth a.k.a. Warpig, the mascot of English rock band Motörhead
- Snivvian (a.k.a. Snaggletooth), a character seen in Star Wars Episode IV: A New Hope, as known as Zutton
- Snaggletooth (fish), predatory fish of the genus Astronesthes
- Snaggletooth shark, Hemipristis elongatus, is a species of weasel shark, family Hemigaleidae, and the only extant member of the genus Hemipristis
- Snagglepuss, originally known as "Snaggletooth", a Hanna-Barbera cartoon character
