= Oreimo =

Japanese light novel series by Tsukasa Fushimi and Hiro Kanzaki

- The cover for the first light novel volume, featuring the main characters; Kirino Kosaka (left) and Kyosuke Kosaka (right)

俺の妹がこんなに可愛いわけがない (Ore no Imōto ga Konna ni Kawaii Wake ga Nai)
- Genre: Comedy
- Light novel
- Written by: Tsukasa Fushimi
- Illustrated by: Hiro Kanzaki
- Published by: ASCII Media Works
- Imprint: Dengeki Bunko
- Original run: August 10, 2008 – September 10, 2021
- Volumes: 17
- Manga
- Written by: Tsukasa Fushimi
- Illustrated by: Sakura Ikeda
- Published by: ASCII Media Works
- English publisher: NA: Dark Horse Comics
- Magazine: Dengeki G's Magazine
- Original run: January 30, 2009 – April 4, 2011
- Volumes: 4
- Anime television series
- Directed by: Hiroyuki Kanbe
- Written by: Hideyuki Kurata; Tsukasa Fushimi
- Music by: Satoru Kōsaki
- Studio: AIC Build
- Licensed by: AUS: Madman Entertainment; NA: Aniplex of America; UK: MVM Films; SA/SEA: Muse Communication
- Original network: Tokyo MX, TV Saitama, tvk, CTC, TV Aichi, TVQ, TVh, MBS, AT-X, BS11
- Original run: October 3, 2010 – December 19, 2010
- Episodes: 12
- Original net animation
- Directed by: Hiroyuki Kanbe
- Written by: Hideyuki Kurata
- Music by: Satoru Kōsaki
- Studio: AIC Build
- Licensed by: NA: Aniplex of America
- Released: February 22, 2011 – May 31, 2011
- Runtime: 24 minutes each
- Episodes: 4
- Manga

Ore no Kōhai ga Konna ni Kawaii Wake ga Nai
- Written by: Tsukasa Fushimi
- Illustrated by: Sakura Ikeda
- Published by: ASCII Media Works
- Magazine: Dengeki G's Magazine; Dengeki G's Comic
- Original run: May 30, 2011 – May 30, 2015
- Volumes: 6
- Anime television series

Ore no Imōto ga Konna ni Kawaii Wake ga Nai.
- Directed by: Hiroyuki Kanbe
- Written by: Hideyuki Kurata; Tsukasa Fushimi
- Music by: Satoru Kōsaki
- Studio: A-1 Pictures
- Licensed by: AUS: Madman Entertainment; NA: Aniplex of America; UK: MVM Films
- Original network: Tokyo MX, tvk, Tochigi TV, Gunma TV, TV Saitama, CTC, TV Aichi, TVQ, TVh, ABC, BS11, AT-X
- Original run: April 7, 2013 – June 30, 2013
- Episodes: 13
- Original net animation

Ore no Imōto ga Konna ni Kawaii Wake ga Nai.
- Directed by: Hiroyuki Kanbe
- Written by: Hideyuki Kurata
- Music by: Satoru Kōsaki
- Studio: A-1 Pictures
- Licensed by: NA: Aniplex of America
- Released: August 18, 2013
- Episodes: 3
- Manga

Ore no Imōto ga Konnani Kawaii Wake ga Nai Kuroneko If
- Written by: Airi Mori
- Published by: Kadokawa Shoten
- Magazine: Monthly Shōnen Ace
- Original run: July 26, 2021 – January 26, 2024
- Volumes: 4
- Video games
- Oreimo video games
- icon

Oreimo, short for Ore no Imōto ga Konna ni Kawaii Wake ga Nai, (Note: 俺の妹がこんなに可愛いわけがない, lit. "My Little Sister Can't Be This Cute") (Note: Also sometimes known as Ore no Imōto (俺の妹)) is a Japanese light novel series written by Tsukasa Fushimi, with illustrations provided by Hiro Kanzaki. The story depicts high school student Kyosuke Kosaka who discovers that his standoffish younger sister Kirino is actually an otaku with an extensive collection of moe anime and younger sister–themed eroge she has been collecting in secret. Kyosuke quickly becomes Kirino's confidant for her secret hobby.

ASCII Media Works has published 17 volumes in the series under its Dengeki Bunko imprint from August 2008 to September 2021. A manga adaptation drawn by Sakura Ikeda was serialized in ASCII Media Works' Dengeki G's Magazine between 2009 and 2011. AIC produced a 12-episode anime adaptation in 2010, with four additional episodes streamed online in 2011. A-1 Pictures produced a 13-episode second anime season in 2013 with 3 more episodes streamed online later that year. Bandai Namco Games developed three visual novel video games from 2011 to 2013 for the PlayStation Portable and PlayStation 3 consoles.

== Plot ==
Kyosuke Kosaka, a normal 17-year-old high school student living in Chiba, has not gotten along with his younger sister Kirino in years. For longer than he can remember, Kirino has ignored his comings and goings and looked at him with spurning eyes. It seems as if the relationship between Kyosuke and his sister, now 14, will continue this way forever. One day, however, Kyosuke finds a DVD case of a magical girl anime which had fallen in his house's entranceway. To Kyosuke's surprise, he finds a hidden eroge inside the case and he soon learns that both the DVD and the game belong to Kirino. That night, Kirino brings Kyosuke to her room and reveals herself to be an otaku with an extensive collection of moe anime and younger-sister-themed eroge she has been collecting in secret. Kyosuke quickly becomes Kirino's confidant for her secret hobby. The series then follows Kyosuke's efforts to help his sister to reconcile her personal life with her secret hobbies, while restoring their broken relationship and coming to terms with their true feelings for each other.

== Characters ==
The main characters of Oreimo. From left to right: Saori Makishima, Ruri Gokō, Kirino Kosaka, Manami Tamura and Kyosuke Kosaka.

=== Main ===
Kyosuke Kosaka (高坂 京介, Kōsaka Kyōsuke)
Voiced by: Yuichi Nakamura, Mami Fujita (young)
Kyosuke is the 17-year-old protagonist of Oreimo. He has a distant relationship with his sister, and feels that this will never change. However, this suddenly changes when he finds one of her eroge and, after confronting her with it, learns that she is an otaku. Through this experience he realizes that he knows very little about his sister, including her being a model as well as an exemplary student. He decides to become more of an older brother to her. Despite Kyosuke being older, his sister is generally the dominant person in their relationship, with Kyosuke only standing up to her in truly serious situations. Kyosuke initially claims to prefer a relatively peaceful and simple life, but grows to enjoy spending time with his sister as well as the drama she causes to the point where he becomes lonely when she is not around. Kyosuke helped Ruri make friends and joins the Game Research Club with her during his third year when Ruri becomes his junior. Kyosuke dates Ruri during summer vacation but she breaks up with him. In the Oreimo: Kuroneko spin-off manga, the two wind up back together ten years later as an alternate ending to the canonical story written in the original light novels.
In the past, Kyosuke had good grades and was the fastest runner in his elementary school. He also had the tendency to shoulder everything himself, thinking that there was nothing that he could not achieve, and often said "Leave it to me". However, after a hiking accident, Kyosuke was convinced by Manami that he should not try so hard at everything, which drastically changed his personality. He turned into someone who only desired to live a normal lifestyle, and his studies and athleticism worsened over time.
Kirino Kosaka (高坂 桐乃, Kōsaka Kirino)
Voiced by: Ayana Taketatsu

Kirino is Kyosuke's 14-year-old younger sister. She is normally mature and independent for her age. However, this is a facade and she only reveals her true personality—immature, abusive, and ungrateful with an aggressive, tsundere-like character—to Kyosuke, whom she orders to play her games and care for the characters, only to accuse him of being a pervert and a lolicon. She is secretly an otaku with an obsession for "little sister"-themed eroge, as well as the children's anime series Stardust Witch Meruru. Despite her interests, she states she does not know why she started liking eroge and denies having a brother complex. Nevertheless, she frequently forces Kyosuke to spend time with her, whether it is playing games or taking her out, but denies that she actually enjoys the time they spend together.
Ruri Gokō (五更 瑠璃, Gokō Ruri)
Voiced by: Kana Hanazawa
Ruri is a 15-year-old otaku girl who lives near Kirino and later enrolls in Kyosuke's school. She often wears Gothic Lolita clothing based on a character from her favorite anime, even during hot weather, and will sometimes add cat ears and a tail. She calls herself Kuroneko (黒猫; lit. Black Cat) and wears contact lenses to make her blue eyes appear red. Due to both of their tsundere-type personalities, she constantly clashes with Kirino. However, both girls genuinely care for each other and value the time they spend together. Like Kirino, Kuroneko is very prideful but is willing to swallow her pride to achieve a goal. Unlike Kirino, who likes little sister–themed games and magical girl anime, Kuroneko enjoys teen-centered fantasy anime. She often mentions "dark magic", claiming that she has it. She is noted to have a very large vocabulary - Kirino once comments that she needed to use a dictionary to translate her novel.
Kuroneko has two younger sisters, Hinata and Tamaki, whom she cares for dearly, although they and her mother worry about Ruri when she is in otaku mode. At school, Kuroneko wears normal clothes and at home takes care of her younger sisters. She later joins the video game club after she enrolls into Kyosuke's school; she is very good at playing video games. She dates Kyosuke for over summer vacation before breaking up with him.
The Oreimo: Kuroneko spin-off manga, written by author Tsukasa Fushimi, sets an alternate ending to the original canonical story. Ruri still breaks up with him as to not upset Kirino, but he tells her to wait for him. In the manga's epilogue set ten years later, the couple are married, and have at least three children together.
Saori Makishima (槇島 沙織, Makishima Saori)
Voiced by: Hitomi Nabatame
Saori, under the alias Saori Vageena (沙織・バジーナ, Saori Bajīna), is the leader of the "Anime Girls Unite!" group on the Internet, whom Kirino encounters in a meet-up. She wears very thick glasses (shown as swirls) and speaks with an exaggerated tone. She is a fan of Gundam (her alias is named after the character, Quattro Bajeena) and is also a collector of their model kits. Despite her general appearance in public, Saori is actually from a wealthy family and speaks formally when not with her friends. As Kyosuke notes, Saori is drastically different in person as compared to how she communicates over the Internet or the phone.
According to Kyosuke, she dresses as a stereotypical otaku, but has the body of a supermodel. She is tall and usually has to have cosplay costumes tailor-made for her. Despite being a middle school girl around Kirino and Kuroneko's ages, she is around the same height as Kyosuke, which surprises him when he first meets her. Despite her cheery attitude, Saori is quite lonely, living by herself, and has always feared that one day her true friends (Kirino, Kyosuke, and Ruri) will leave her in a similar way that her older sister (who married and moved away) left her. The reason she set up a hobby group of her own is that she was "just the sister of a member" of her sister's hobby group "Pretty Garden," and was severely disappointed and angry when the group eventually dissolved after her sister moved away.
Ayase Aragaki (新垣 あやせ, Aragaki Ayase)
Voiced by: Saori Hayami
Ayase is Kirino's classmate who is her best friend and also works as a model. She admired Kirino for being seemingly perfect in every way and she used to have a crush on Kyosuke, thinking of him as Kirino's caring brother. She was greatly disappointed when she found out about Kirino's otaku hobby and how Kyosuke was aware of it and helped support it. Ayase later reconciled with Kirino, but not as much with Kyosuke. Ayase is normally a friendly, nice, and refined girl, but becomes agitated and somewhat violent at the thought that she is being lied to, which she hates above all else. She also believes what she hears on the news, thus explaining her disapproval of anime and manga, calling it a disgusting hobby, especially eroge, due to the media's portrayal that otaku will eventually become criminals (a clear reference of the Tsutomu Miyazaki case). Once she develops a dislike and contempt for someone, she shows a much ruder and even hostile side of herself. She stubbornly maintains a strong dislike and disrespect for Kyosuke, convincing herself that he is really the pervert she persistently calls him. She becomes good friends with Manami and often confides private matters to her. She eventually overcomes her prejudice and harbors romantic feelings for Kyosuke.
Manami Tamura (田村 麻奈実, Tamura Manami)
Voiced by: Satomi Satō
Manami is Kyosuke's childhood friend. She wears glasses and is described as "plain", something she views as a compliment from Kyosuke. She has a crush on Kyosuke and blushes whenever he compliments her. Due to the amount time they spend together, people around them assume that they are dating. Kyosuke explains that although he does not have feelings for her beyond being close friends, for some reason he does not like the idea of Manami having a boyfriend. Kyosuke is unaware of the many times that Manami has attempted to become closer to him by trying to do things that couples do and how she is willingly doing things to please him in any way, such as cooking and cleaning. According to Kyosuke, her speech patterns resemble those of a grandmother or an old lady. After Kyosuke's accident it was Manami who convinced him to stop trying his best in everything, and made him into the average person today, which severely disappointed Kirino and caused the rift between her and Kirino. She manages to make up with Kirino after Kyosuke gets them to talk. Manami later confesses to Kyosuke but he rejects her.
Kanako Kurusu (来栖 加奈子, Kurusu Kanako)
Voiced by: Yukari Tamura
Kanako is Kirino and Ayase's fellow friend, classmate and model, who sometimes swaps between a cute and a bratty personality. She is a talented singer who dreams of becoming an idol and attends many auditions. She frequently goes to karaoke and is capable of perfectly remembering any song that she has heard once. She is unaware of Kirino's hobby and generally finds anime childish and otaku disgusting, though on one occasion she was tricked into cosplaying as Kirino's favorite anime character, Meruru, for a contest and won. Despite winning the contest, she was disgusted by what she had gone through, but liked the idea of being praised and the event even helped her career. She later realized that Kyosuke, who acted as her manager, was Kirino's brother. She also asked Manami to teach her to cook in order to be able to cook for her parents.
Sena Akagi (赤城 瀬菜, Akagi Sena)
Voiced by: Mariya Ise
Kōhei's little sister and a member of the Games Research club, as well as Ruri's classmate. Similar to Kirino, she has an obsession with eroge, albeit she prefers hardcore yaoi. She even fantasies about her other clubmates, imagining her brother and Kyosuke as a couple and becoming visibly disappointed when Kyosuke assures her that he is straight. The relationship she has with her brother is quite strong yet it is unclear how they feel about each other. She joined the Games Research club in order to learn how to become a games designer. She is also very good at games, and skilled in programming. In volume 12, she ends up dating Makabe.

=== Supporting ===
Daisuke Kosaka (高坂 大介, Kōsaka Daisuke)
Voiced by: Fumihiko Tachiki
He is Kirino and Kyosuke's domineering father. He is a high-ranking police officer and has a no nonsense policy at home. He does not like the fact that Kirino is a model, but allows her to do so if she does well in school. He is severely against otaku, believing them to be a waste of a life, so when he finds out Kirino is one, he orders her to throw away all of her otaku-related material. When Kyosuke challenges him, he allows her to keep everything except the eroge, although Kyosuke manages to protect even that by claiming that they belong to him. He is shown to truly care for Kirino despite his gruff exterior, as he has saved every article and picture of all her accomplishments. He claims that he knows best of what is going on in the family and he has always known that the eroge belonged to Kirino, despite Kyosuke's effort to convince him otherwise. In Ore no Imōto ga Konna ni Kawaii Wake ga Nai Portable ga Tsuzuku Wake ga Nai, he is Kyosuke's uncle.
Yoshino Kosaka (高坂 佳乃, Kōsaka Yoshino)
Voiced by: Akeno Watanabe
She is Kirino and Kyosuke's loving mother. She is aware of her daughter's obsession, as she has referred to her as "my otaku daughter". She is aware of many things going on in her family and helps keep the peace in the house. She is the first one to question the improving relationship between Kyosuke and Kirino, which in turn resulted in Kyosuke moving out in order to prepare for his examinations. However, she never considered Kyosuke and Kirino to have an unhealthy relationship and was instead using this improved relationship in order to improve Kyosuke's grades. In Ore no Imōto ga Konna ni Kawaii Wake ga Nai Portable ga Tsuzuku Wake ga Nai, she is Kyosuke's aunt.
Iwao Tamura (田村 いわお, Tamura Iwao)
Voiced by: Hiromi Ohtsuda
Manami's little brother, whose attempts to follow the cool trends often backfire on him. He sports a buzzcut having been convinced that he was getting a skinhead look. It is hinted that he formed a pact with Kirino during primary school to boycott Kyosuke and Manami, but apologized to Kyosuke after Kyosuke helped him in school and has been a loyal follower of Kyosuke since then.
Kōhei Akagi (赤城 浩平, Akagi Kōhei)
Voiced by: Junji Majima
Kyosuke's classmate who, similar to Kyosuke, often has to support his little sister's hobby for eroge. Unlike Kyosuke's strained relationship with Kirino, Kōhei's relationship with Sena is much better, although Kyosuke considers him to be somewhat of a siscon. While he is a huge siscon, his feelings for his little sister are completely unromantic and only loves her as a little sister.
Gennosuke Miura (三浦 絃之介, Miura Gennosuke)
Voiced by: Go Inoue
The president of the Games Research club at Kyosuke's school, which both Kyosuke and Ruri end up joining. He is also into little sister–themed eroge and Kyosuke first meets him when trying to borrow a bike to ride home following a midnight eroge launch.
Kaede Makabe (真壁 楓, Makabe Kaede)
Voiced by: Yoshitsugu Matsuoka
Kaede is a second year member of the Games Research club, and also the most normal member of the club. He dates Sena in volume 12 and calls Kōhei "Aniki".
Iori Fate Setsuna (伊織・フェイト・刹那, Iori Feito Setsuna)
Voiced by: Shizuka Itō
Iori is the editor who published Kirino's work. In the light novel, she stole Kirino's work and passed it off as her own.
Misaki Fujima (藤真 美咲, Fujima Misaki)
Voiced by: Yū Asakawa
Misaki is the president of Eternal Blue who tried to persuade Kirino to pursue a modelling career abroad.
Kōki Mikagami (御鏡 光輝, Mikagami Kōki)
Voiced by: Yūichi Iguchi
Kōki is a model who is secretly an otaku. Kirino asked him to pretend to be her boyfriend in order to make Kyosuke understand how she felt when he hung out with other girls. Later on, he befriended Kyosuke and helped him several times, such as giving dating advice. However, he also caused trouble for Kyosuke, such as when he gave Kyosuke an expensive set of adult game figures as a housewarming gift.
Hinata Gokō (五更 日向, Gokō Hinata)
Voiced by: Kana Hanazawa
The elder of Ruri's little sisters. Despite her young age, she is able to understand the situation her sister is in. She once thought that her sister was pretending to have a boyfriend and was surprised to find out that Kyosuke was real. She also understands the circumstances of Ruri's breakup with Kyosuke.
Tamaki Gokō (五更 珠希, Gokō Tamaki)
Voiced by: Yui Ogura
The younger of Ruri's little sisters. She was scared by Kirino's beastly act upon seeing her. She loves her older sisters dearly and gets along well with Kyosuke.
Bridget Evans (ブリジット・エヴァンス, Burijitto Evansu)
Voiced by: Misaki Kuno
Bridget is the winner of the first Meruru cosplay event. However, she lost to Kanako in the second event. She later grew to be quite close to Kanako.
Ria Hagry (リア・ハグリィ, Ria Hagurī)
Voiced by: Ibuki Kido
Ria is Kirino's roommate during her stay in the United States who devotes her life to running. Known as the fastest elementary school runner, Kirino outran her when Kyosuke came to pick Kirino up in the United States. Ria came to Japan seeking revenge, and was able to beat Kirino in another race.
Kaori Makishima (槇島 香織, Makishima Kaori)
Voiced by: Houko Kuwashima
Kaori is Saori's elder sister who created the group "Pretty Garden," which Saori participated in. However, she left a bad impression on Saori after she left for America, which caused Pretty Garden to dissolve and eventually influenced Saori to create her own hobby group. It is revealed that after the misunderstandings between the sisters was solved, they became close.
Kanata Kurusu (来栖 彼方, Kurusu Kanata)
Voiced by: Rie Kugimiya
Kanata is Kanako's sister and a manga author who was a prominent member of Pretty Garden. She was Saori's biggest influence in her otaku hobbies.
Shinya Sanada (真田 信也, Sanada Shinya)
Voiced by: Masayuki Katō
Shinya was another prominent member of Pretty Garden.
Sayaka Kakei (筧 沙也加, Kakei Sayaka)
Sayaka is the owner of Ayase's fan blog who stalks Ayase. Sayaka admires Ayase, and was disappointed in the misunderstanding that Ayase started dating Kyosuke as Ayase went to Kyosuke's house every day during his mock-exam period. Kyosuke eventually mediated the relationship between Sayaka and Ayase while Sayaka said that she aspires to be a photographer.
Akimi Sakurai (櫻井 秋美, Sakurai Akimi)
Voiced by: Ayane Sakura
Akimi is Kyosuke's middle school classmate who refused to come to school during middle school. After several attempts, Kyosuke managed to convince her to come to school and even forged her parents' signature so that she could go on a field trip. Unfortunately Akimi was injured falling from a tree in a restricted area that Kyosuke brought her to. As a result, her parents moved her to another school and forbade Kyosuke from interacting with her again, which was the main cause for Kyosuke's change in personality. Three years after the incident, Akimi managed to find Kyosuke and confessed to him, but was rejected.

== Media ==
=== Light novels ===
Oreimo began as a light novel series written by Tsukasa Fushimi, with illustrations provided by Hiro Kanzaki. ASCII Media Works published 12 novels under their Dengeki Bunko imprint between August 10, 2008, and June 7, 2013. The first volume of a two-part alternative ending of the series subtitled Ayase if was released on August 10, 2019, and the second volume was released on June 10, 2020. The first volume of a two-part alternative ending of the series subtitled Kuroneko if was released on September 10, 2020, and the second volume was released on March 10, 2021. One volume of an alternative ending of the series subtitled Kanako if was released on September 10, 2021.

=== Manga ===
A manga adaptation based on the light novels drawn by Sakura Ikeda was serialized in ASCII Media Works' Dengeki G's Magazine between the March 2009 and May 2011 issues. Four tankōbon volumes were released under ASCII Media Works' Dengeki Comics imprint between October 27, 2009, and April 27, 2011. The third volume was released in regular and special editions; the special edition came bundled with an Ayase Aragaki figurine. The manga has been licensed in North America by Dark Horse Comics. A follow-up manga, Ore no Kōhai ga Konna ni Kawaii Wake ga Nai, (Note: 俺の後輩がこんなに可愛いわけがない; lit. My Junior Can't Be This Cute) began serialization in the July 2011 issue of Dengeki G's Magazine and features Ruri Goko as the main heroine. The manga ended serialization in the magazine's May 2014 issue and continued serialization in Dengeki G's Comic between the June 2014 and July 2015 issues. Six tankōbon volumes were released under ASCII Media Works' Dengeki Comics imprint between May 26, 2012, and July 27, 2015, with the first volume special edition coming bundled with a Kuroneko figurine.

A spin-off manga series by Airi Mori, titled Ore no Imōto ga Konnani Kawaii Wake ga Nai Kuroneko If was serialized in Kadokawa Shoten's Monthly Shōnen Ace magazine from July 26, 2021, to January 26, 2024. The first volume was released on March 10, 2022, and the fourth and last was released on February 26, 2024.

=== Drama CD ===
A drama CD, based on events from the first and third volumes of the novels as well as a newly written scenario by Tsukasa Fushimi, was released by ASCII Media Works on March 31, 2010. The CD stars Ayana Taketatsu as Kirino and Yūichi Nakamura as Kyōsuke.

=== Internet radio shows ===
An Internet radio show, titled Ore no Imōto ga (Radio de mo) Konna ni Kawaii Wake ga Nai, (Note: 俺の妹が(ラジオでも)こんなに可愛いわけがない, There's No Way My Little Sister (Radio Version) Can Be This Cute) to promote the anime adaptation streamed 24 episodes between August 13, 2010, and July 22, 2011, via the official website of the anime. The show was hosted by Taketatsu, who plays Kirino in the anime, and Kana Hanazawa, who plays Kuroneko. A second Internet radio show to promote the second season of the anime started on April 11, 2013. The show was again hosted by Taketatsu and Hanazawa. Even though the show was limited to the Japanese speaking audience, the e-mails and comments from fans outside Japan were also accepted and sometimes read during the show, and the official website of the show has been translated into English.

=== Anime ===
A 12-episode anime adaptation produced by AIC, directed by Hiroyuki Kanbe, and with screenplay by Hideyuki Kurata aired in Japan between October 3 and December 19, 2010. The series was released over eight BD/DVD compilation volumes, each holding two episodes, between December 22, 2010, and July 27, 2011. Four original net animation episodes were streamed through the official website, as well as several other websites such as Nico Nico Douga, Showtime Japan, and MovieGate, which began on February 22, 2011. The first two were released on June 27, 2011, together with the seventh BD/DVD volume and the last two were released on July 27, 2011, together with the eighth. These episodes feature a break in the original story arc starting at episode 12 and offer an alternate ending from the TV broadcast. The anime retains the voice cast from the drama CD. The opening theme for the anime is "Irony" by ClariS and is composed by Kz of Livetune, while each episode features a different ending theme sung by one of the voice actors. The music of the anime is composed by Satoru Kōsaki and a soundtrack was released on January 12, 2011. Aniplex of America began streaming and simulcasting the series in North America through Anime News Network (ANN), but security issues involving the illegal leaking of episode two online resulted in the stream being placed on hold. The stream of Oreimo returned to ANN with the first four episodes on November 8, 2010. Aniplex of America released the series on an English-subtitled DVD box set in October 2011. The anime is licensed by MVM Films in the United Kingdom.

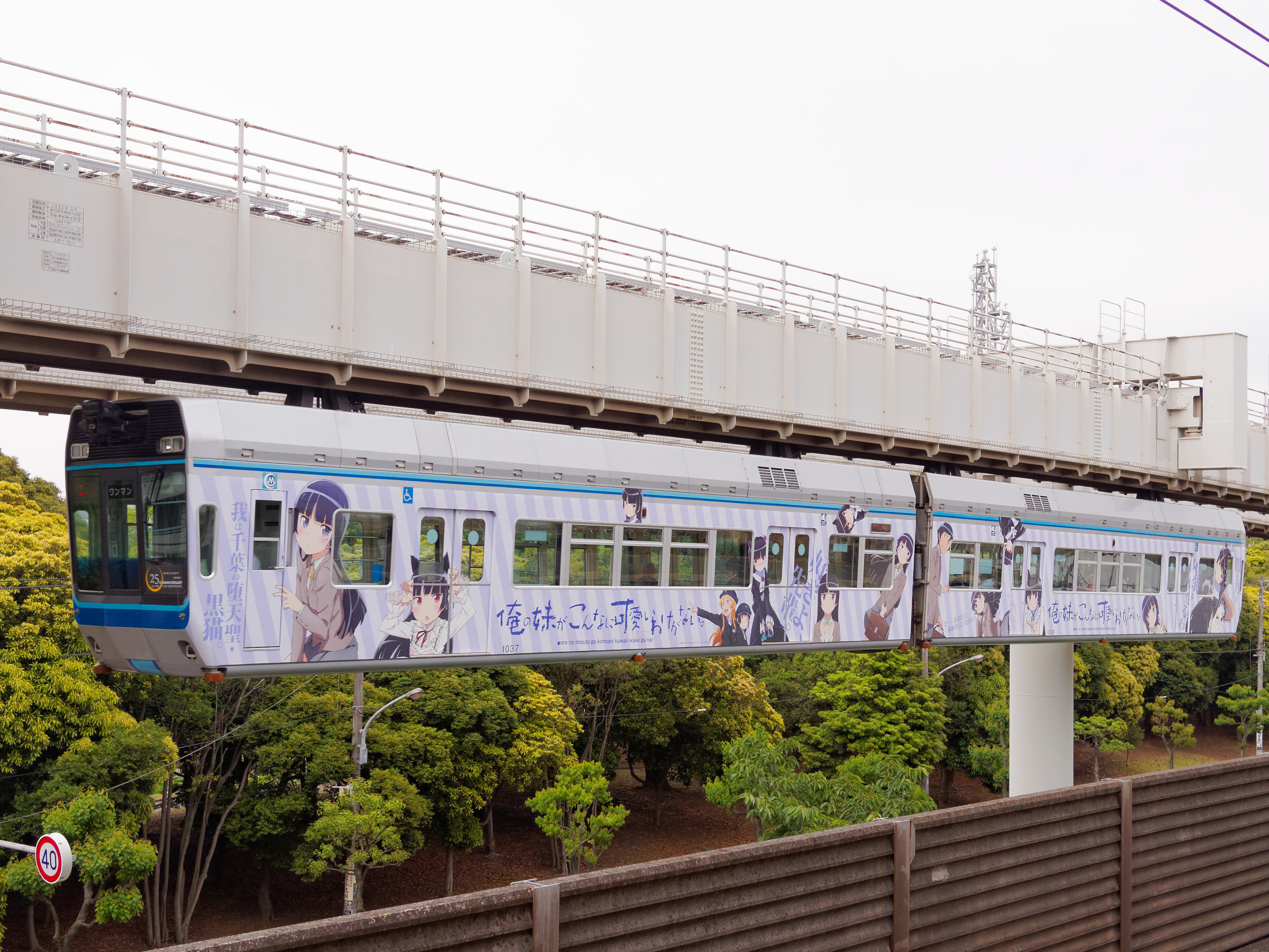
Oreimo train of Chiba Urban Monorail

A second 13-episode anime season, titled Ore no Imōto ga Konna ni Kawaii Wake ga Nai., (Note: 俺の妹がこんなに可愛いわけがない。; with a period at the end) and produced by A-1 Pictures, aired between April 7 and June 30, 2013 and was simulcast by Crunchyroll. An additional three episodes were screened at Otakon 2013 on August 9, 2013, and then streamed worldwide on August 18. The episodes were simulcast by Crunchyroll at the same time as the Japanese broadcast and were available until August 31, 2013. Despite the change in animation studio from the first season, the second season has the same staff as the first. The opening theme is "Reunion" by ClariS, while a contest was held for the second season's ending themes. This series has also been licensed by Aniplex of America. A-1 Pictures collaborated with Chiba Urban Monorail to promote the second season by making an Oreimo-themed monorail train, which remained in operation until September 30, 2013. In addition to decorating the exterior of the train, the anime characters were featured in in-train advertising to provide passengers with helpful tips about local sightseeing facilities and shops.

In addition to their own series, the characters from Oreimo also make cameo appearances in the episodes of the anime adaptation of Eromanga Sensei, another light novel series written by Fushimi and illustrated by Kanzaki.

=== Video games ===
A PlayStation Portable visual novel titled Ore no Imōto ga Konna ni Kawaii Wake ga Nai Portable was developed by Bandai Namco Games and released on January 27, 2011. The limited edition bundle included an OAD, a sister-talk bonus CD, and an additional game for the PSP. A fighting game titled Shin Imōto Taisen Siscalypse, (Note: 真妹大戦シスカリプス; lit. True Little Sister War, Siscalypse) based on the fictional game in the series, was released by Kadokawa Contents Gate on the Yahoo! MobaGe Service on January 20, 2011. A second PSP title, Ore no Imōto ga Konna ni Kawaii Wake ga Nai Portable ga Tsuzuku Wake ga Nai, (Note: 俺の妹がこんなに可愛いわけがない ポータブルが続くわけがない; lit. There's No Way "My Little Sister Can't Be This Cute Portable" Could Continue) was released on May 17, 2012. The opening theme of the second PSP game is "Nexus" by ClariS. A PlayStation 3 game, Ore no Imōto ga Konna ni Kawaii Wake ga Nai Happy End, (Note: 俺の妹がこんなに可愛いわけがない。 ハッピーエンド) was released on September 26, 2013, in Japan.

Kirino also makes a cameo appearance in the A Certain Magical Index PSP game, being another game based on a light novel series published by ASCII Media Works. Kirino also appears as a playable character in Dengeki Bunko: Fighting Climax, with Kuroneko as a supporting character.

== Reception ==
The Mainichi Shimbun reported that the fourth volume sold the most copies of any light novel in August 2009. Anime News Network (ANN) reported in April 2012 that the first nine light novels had collectively sold 3.7 million copies in Japan.

ANN writer Kim Morrissy cited Oreimo as the series that revived the little sister boom, and made comparisons to Tsukasa Fushimi's later series Eromanga Sensei. Morrissy stated that the key difference between the two, despite sharing a little sister moe theme, is that Oreimo has committed the ultimate incest taboo due to Kyosuke and Kirino being related by blood, whereas the siblings in Eromanga Sensei lack a blood relation, hence "allowing the romance to play out with a less direct connection to real-life incest".

== Notes ==
Japanese
