= Eromanga Sensei =

Japanese light novel series by Tsukasa Fushimi and Hiro Kanzaki

- Cover of the first light novel featuring Sagiri (left) and Masamune (right)

エロマンガ先生
- Genre: Romantic comedy
- Light novel
- Written by: Tsukasa Fushimi
- Illustrated by: Hiro Kanzaki
- Published by: ASCII Media Works
- Imprint: Dengeki Bunko
- Original run: December 10, 2013 – August 10, 2022
- Volumes: 13
- Manga
- Written by: Tsukasa Fushimi
- Illustrated by: Rin
- Published by: ASCII Media Works
- English publisher: NA: Dark Horse Comics
- Imprint: Dengeki Comics
- Magazine: Dengeki Daioh
- Original run: May 27, 2014 – May 27, 2021
- Volumes: 12
- Anime television series
- Directed by: Ryohei Takeshita
- Produced by: Shinichiro Kashiwada; Shōki Niwa; Kazuma Miki; Noriko Kosukegawa; Kozue Kananiwa; Tomoyuki Ohwada
- Written by: Tatsuya Takahashi; Gō Zappa; Tsukasa Fushimi
- Music by: Tomoki Kikuya
- Studio: A-1 Pictures
- Licensed by: AUS: Madman Entertainment; NA: Aniplex of America; UK: MVM Films
- Original network: Tokyo MX, MBS, TVA, GTV, GYT, BS11, AT-X
- Original run: April 9, 2017 – June 25, 2017
- Episodes: 12
- Manga

Eromanga Sensei The Great Teacher Elf Yamada's Cooked Meals of Pure Love
- Published by: ASCII Media Works
- Imprint: Dengeki Comics
- Magazine: Dengeki Daioh
- Original run: July 27, 2018 – November 27, 2019
- Volumes: 3
- Original video animation
- Directed by: Ryohei Takeshita
- Written by: Ryohei Takeshita; Tatsuya Takahashi
- Music by: Tomoki Kikuya
- Studio: A-1 Pictures
- Released: January 16, 2019
- Runtime: 24 minutes each
- Episodes: 2
- icon

Eromanga Sensei (Japanese: エロマンガ先生; lit. "Erotic Manga Author/Eromanga Author") is a Japanese light novel series written by Tsukasa Fushimi and illustrated by Hiro Kanzaki. ASCII Media Works has published thirteen volumes in the series under its Dengeki Bunko imprint from December 2013 to August 2022. A manga adaptation illustrated by Rin has been serialized in Dengeki Daioh from May 2014 to May 2021. An anime adaptation produced by A-1 Pictures aired from April to June 2017.

== Premise ==
The story revolves around high school student Masamune Izumi who loves writing light novels. Having no artistic skill himself, Masamune always gets his novels illustrated by an anonymous partner using the pen name "Eromanga", who is known for drawing questionably perverted images despite being extremely reliable. In addition to balancing his passion and school, Masamune is also stuck with taking care of his only family member—his younger stepsister Sagiri Izumi. A hikikomori by nature, Sagiri shut herself in her room for over a year and constantly bosses Masamune around despite his attempts to get her to leave her room. However, when Masamune inadvertently discovers that his anonymous partner has been Sagiri all along, their sibling relationship quickly leaps to new levels of excitement, especially when a beautiful, female, best-selling light novel author enters the fray.

== Characters ==
Masamune Izumi (和泉 正宗, Izumi Masamune)
Voiced by: Yoshitsugu Matsuoka
The protagonist of the series, he is a 15-year-old first-year high school student. When he was in junior high school, he won an award for writing a light novel series. He later writes a series known as Silverwolf of Reincarnation and hires an anonymous illustrator named "Eromanga", but discovers that Eromanga is his own stepsister Sagiri.
Sagiri Izumi (和泉 紗霧, Izumi Sagiri)
Voiced by: Akane Fujita
The heroine of the series and the titular Eromanga Sensei, she is a 12-year-old first-year junior high school student. She is a hikikomori who never leaves her room, even to eat, instead relying on her stepbrother to bring food to her room. She later starts inviting her brother into her room and opens up more to the world, even venturing outside the boundaries of her room. Even though Masamune and several other people know that she is "Eromanga Sensei", she always stalls the conversation by saying she does not know someone of that name. According to her blog, the pen name is derived from the name of an island and does not have any relationship with any ecchi manga. Prior to her mother marrying Masamune's father, she had unknowingly known him as an online friend. In the anime, Sagiri's illustrations are drawn by Tiv.
Elf Yamada (山田エルフ, Yamada Erufu)
Voiced by: Minami Takahashi
Elf is a 14-year-old popular light novel author who has sold over 2 million copies. She starts living next door to Masamune and is famed for dressing in a lolita style. She has shown to have developed romantic feelings for Masamune and has confessed to him. Elf Yamada is her pen name. Her real name is Emily Granger (エミリー・グレンジャー, Emirī Gurenjā).
Muramasa Senju (千寿 ムラマサ, Senju Muramasa)
Voiced by: Saori Ōnishi
Muramasa is a successful light novel writer who has sold over 14.5 million copies of her novel series. She is a fan of Masamune's Silverwolf of Reincarnation series, and gets upset after he ends the series. She tried to stop him from writing romantic comedy series but admitted defeat after losing to him in the Light Novel Tenkaichi Butōkai (ラノベ天下一武闘会, Ranobe Tenkaichi Butōkai) competition. She is in love with Masamune, but he rejects her after she confesses her feelings to him. Muramasa Senju is her pen name. Her real name is Hana Umezono (梅園 花, Umezono Hana).
Megumi Jinno (神野 めぐみ, Jinno Megumi)
Voiced by: Ibuki Kido
Megumi is a classmate of Sagiri, and a former amateur model. While initially believed to be a perverted girl, however, Megumi is actually quite innocent, and just pretends to be experienced about relationships and the opposite sex in order to make herself look "cool".
Tomoe Takasago (高砂 智恵, Takasago Tomoe)
Voiced by: Yui Ishikawa
Tomoe is Masamune's childhood and his best friend whose family runs a local bookstore, Takasago Shoten (たかさご書店).
Kunimitsu Shidō (獅童 国光, Shidō Kunimitsu)
Voiced by: Nobunaga Shimazaki
Shidō is one of the participants of the Light Novel Tenkaichi Butōkai competition, but he lost the event since Masamune won first place and he only won second place.
Ayame Kagurazaka (神楽坂 あやめ, Kagurazaka Ayame)
Voiced by: Mikako Komatsu
Kagurazaka is Masamune's and Muramasa's executive editor.
Chris Yamada (山田 クリス, Yamada Kurisu)
Voiced by: Seiichiro Yamashita
Chris is Elf's older brother and her executive editor.

== Media ==
=== Light novel ===
The light novels are written by Tsukasa Fushimi and illustrated by Hiro Kanzaki. The series is published by ASCII Media Works under their Dengeki Bunko imprint, and the first volume was released on December 10, 2013. The thirteenth and the final volume was released on August 10, 2022.

==== Volumes ====
| No. | Title | Japanese release date | Japanese ISBN |
|---|---|---|---|
| 1 | My Little Sister and the Sealed Room; Imōto to Akazu no Ma (妹と開かずの間) | December 10, 2013 | 978-4-04-866081-5 |
| 2 | My Little Sister and the Most Interesting Novel in the World; Imōto to Sekai de Ichiban Omoshiroi Shōsetsu (妹と世界で一番面白い小説) | May 10, 2014 | 978-4-04-866531-5 |
| 3 | My Little Sister and Fairy Island; Imōto to Yōsei no Shima (妹と妖精の島) | October 10, 2014 | 978-4-04-866937-5 |
| 4 | Eromanga Sensei VS Eromanga Sensei G Eromanga-sensei VS Eromanga-sensei G (エロマンガ先生VSエロマンガ先生G) | March 10, 2015 | 978-4-04-869334-9 |
| 5 | Sagiri Izumi's School Debut; Izumi Sagiri no Hatsutōkō (和泉紗霧の初登校) | September 10, 2015 | 978-4-04-865381-7 |
| 6 | Ten Reasons to be Married to Elf Yamada-chan; Yamada Erufu-chan to Kekkon Subeki Jū no Riyū (山田エルフちゃんと結婚すべき十の理由) | March 10, 2016 | 978-4-04-865808-9 |
| 7 | Cohabitation Starting with Anime; Anime de Hajimaru Dōsei Seikatsu (アニメで始まる同棲生活) | August 10, 2016 | 978-4-04-892249-4 |
| 8 | Masamune Izumi's Holiday; Izumi Masamune no Kyūjitsu (和泉マサムネの休日) | January 10, 2017 | 978-4-04-892597-6 |
| 9 | Sagiri's New Married Life; Sagiri no Shinkon Seikatsu (紗霧の新婚生活) | June 9, 2017 | 978-4-04-892950-9 |
| 10 | Muramasa Senju and the Cultural Festival of Love; Senju Muramasa to Koi no Bunkasai (千寿ムラマサと恋の文化祭) | July 10, 2018 | 978-4-04-893914-0 |
| 11 | My Little Sister's Pajama Party; Imōto-tachi no Pajama Pāti (妹たちのパジャマパーティ) | January 10, 2019 | 978-4-04-912198-8 |
| 12 | Elf Yamada Reversal Victory; Yamada Erufu-chan Gyakuten Shōri no Maki (山田エルフちゃん逆転勝利の巻) | November 9, 2019 | 978-4-04-912892-5 |
| 13 | Eromanga Festival; Eromanga Fesutibaru (エロマンガフェスティバル) | August 10, 2022 | 978-4-04-914493-2 |

=== Manga ===
A manga adaptation illustrated by Rin has been serialized in ASCII Media Works' Dengeki Daioh magazine from May 27, 2014 to May 27, 2021. The manga has been compiled into twelve tankōbon volumes since November 10, 2014. Dark Horse Comics licensed the series in North America and released the first three volumes. In July 2020, the manga became one of seven titles to be removed from Books Kinokuniya in Australia for claims of promoting child pornography.

| No. | Original release date | Original ISBN | English release date | English ISBN |
|---|---|---|---|---|
| 1 | November 10, 2014 | 978-4-04-866922-1 | October 3, 2018 | 978-1-5067-0984-0 |
| 2 | May 9, 2015 | 978-4-04-865087-8 | March 20, 2019 | 978-1-5067-0985-7 |
| 3 | January 9, 2016 | 978-4-04-865518-7 | July 3, 2019 | 978-1-5067-0986-4 |
| 4 | August 10, 2016 | 978-4-04-892172-5 | — | — |
| 5 | March 10, 2017 | 978-4-04-892718-5 | — | — |
| 6 | October 7, 2017 | 978-4-04-893431-2 | — | — |
| 7 | June 9, 2018 | 978-4-04-893849-5 | — | — |
| 8 | February 2, 2019 | 978-4-04-912351-7 | — | — |
| 9 | November 9, 2019 | 978-4-04-912837-6 | — | — |
| 10 | June 10, 2020 | 978-4-04-913234-2 | — | — |
| 11 | February 10, 2021 | 978-4-04-913660-9 | — | — |
| 12 | September 10, 2021 | 978-4-04-913990-7 | — | — |

A spin-off manga focusing on the character Elf Yamada began serialization in the September issue of Dengeki Daioh on July 27, 2018. It ended on November 27, 2019 and was collected into three volumes.

| No. | Title | Japanese release date | Japanese ISBN |
|---|---|---|---|
| 1 | Eromanga Sensei The Great Teacher Elf Yamada's Cooked Meals of Pure Love 1 エロマンガ先生 山田エルフ大先生の恋する純真ごはん（１） | February 9, 2019 | 978-4-04-912352-4 |
| 2 | Eromanga Sensei The Great Teacher Elf Yamada's Cooked Meals of Pure Love 2 エロマンガ先生 山田エルフ大先生の恋する純真ごはん（２） | October 10, 2019 | 978-4-04-912705-8 |
| 3 | Eromanga Sensei The Great Teacher Elf Yamada's Cooked Meals of Pure Love 3 エロマンガ先生 山田エルフ大先生の恋する純真ごはん（３） | February 10, 2020 | 978-4-04-913023-2 |

=== Anime ===
An anime television series adaptation is directed by Ryohei Takeshita, written by Tatsuya Takahashi, and produced by Shinichiro Kashiwada and Aniplex, featuring animation by the studio A-1 Pictures. It was announced in September 2016 via a Nico Nico Live stream. On January 8, 2017, Ryohei announced that he will recruit more animators via Twitter. The anime aired from April 9 (Note: The first episode was broadcast on April 8, 2017 at 24:30, which is essentially April 9 at 12:30 a.m.) to June 25, 2017. Two original video animation episodes were scheduled to be released in 2018 but were pushed back to January 16, 2019. The opening theme is "Hitorigoto" (ヒトリゴト, Soliloquy) by ClariS, and the ending theme is "Adrenaline!!!" by TrySail, with episode 8 featuring "Natsuiro Koi Hanabi" (夏色恋花火, The Summer Colored Fireworks of Love) by Akane Fujita. Aniplex of America has licensed the series in North America. Crunchyroll streamed the series in the Americas, Australia, New Zealand, United Kingdom and Ireland.

==== Episodes ====
| No. | Title (Note: All English titles are taken from Crunchyroll.) | Original air date |
|---|---|---|
| 1 | "My Little Sister, and the Sealed Room"; Transliteration: "Imōto to Akazu no Ma" (Japanese: 妹と開かずの間) | April 9, 2017 |
High School student Masamune Izumi lives a balanced life between his career as a novelist, and looking after his foster sister Sagiri who became a shut-in a year prior. When Masamune's books became popular on the charts, he is demanded to be seen in public along with his illustrator, an anonymous person who goes by the pen name "Eromanga". Later on, when Masamune watches Eromanga Sensei's live stream as she was illustrating and chatting with her fans, he discovers that Eromanga Sensei's real identity is none other than Sagiri.
| 2 | "Class Rep with a Normie Life, and a Fearless Fairy"; Transliteration: "Riajū Inchō to Futeki na Yōsei" (Japanese: リア充委員長と不敵な妖精) | April 16, 2017 |
Sagiri's junior high school classmate Megumi Jinno visits Masamune's home in a bid to get Sagiri to return to school. After Sagiri refuses, Masamune convinces Megumi to leave. Later that evening, he goes to a local bookstore where he meets his friend Tomoe Takasago, who introduces Masamune to a collection of new books written by Elf Yamada on the recommended shelf. After Masamune buys Elf's books, he witnesses Elf in a dispute with his editor, Ayame Kagurazaka, over Eromanga Sensei being Elf's new illustrator, much to Masamune's dismay. Ayame refuses, and Elf leaves in anger.
| 3 | "Buck Naked Mansion and the Fallen Master"; Transliteration: "Zenra no Yakata to Daraku no Aruji" (Japanese: 全裸の館と堕落の主) | April 23, 2017 |
Megumi brings the rest of the class to Masamune's home in an attempt and get Sagiri to go back to school, but Masamune refuses. Later on, Masamune learns that Elf lives next door after he hears Sagiri's complaints about piano sounds coming from next door. Masamune visits Elf's home where he learns that she is a well-received author, and is curious to learn more about how she works. They become great friends, but also great rivals, and decide to have a contest to decide who gets to partner with Eromanga Sensei for their next novel. Later on, Sagiri accuses Masamune of lying about his relationship with Elf and orders him to leave her room for the remainder of the day.
| 4 | "Eromanga Sensei"; Transliteration: "Eromanga Sensei" (Japanese: エロマンガ先生) | April 30, 2017 |
The contest ends in Masamune's favor. Although Elf's manuscript was better than his, she tears it apart after learning of Eromanga Sensei's real identity as Sagiri. After brimming with happiness, Masamune jumps back home through Sagiri's bedroom window, where they make amends and clear up some misunderstandings. A worried Sagiri believed that Masamune wanted to replace her with Elf as his new illustrator, which causes her to lock herself up in her room and spends time watching battle scenes and analyzing weapons to draw out better battle scenes and girls with larger breasts. Masamune tells a touched Sagiri the truth after showing her his manuscript, which tells a story about her. Masamune wants to publish it as a book, which would then earn them much money. Afterwards, Sagiri opens her door, and steps out of her room for the first time.
| 5 | "Let's Make a Light Novel Plan with My Little Sister"; Transliteration: "Imōto to Ranobe Kikaku o Tsukurō" (Japanese: 妹とラノベ企画を創ろう) | May 7, 2017 |
Sagiri confesses to Masamune that she loves someone. Masamune attempts to confess to Sagiri, but is unsure of how Sagiri responds to the confession. A frustrated Sagiri returns to drawing practice when Masamune receives a call from a highly distressed Elf after her editor has arrived on her doorstep to monitor her work progress. Elf begs Masamune to shelter her for a while, and in return teaches him how to write a project proposal and shows Sagiri her panties for inspiration. After Masamune becomes inspired by Sagiri's drawings, she tells him that she has an "artist's block", and that she needs Masamune to find her pretty girl models with large breasts and a willingness to show off their panties. A disturbed Masamune is contacted by Megumi to check up on Sagiri, and after learning of Sagiri's friendship with Elf, she decides to read light novels so that she can befriend Sagiri.
| 6 | "Masamune Izumi and the Nemesis of Ten Million Copies"; Transliteration: "Izumi Masamune to Issen-man-bu no Shukuteki" (Japanese: 和泉マサムネと一千万部の宿敵) | May 14, 2017 |
Megumi agrees to be blindfolded and immobile for Sagiri to draw her so that she can borrow Sagiri's light novels. Although Megumi successfully receives Sagiri's books, she fails to befriend Sagiri. Meanwhile, Masamune finishes the manuscript and takes it to Ayame, who tells Masamune that his book can only be published a year later due to her priority for Muramasa Senju, a bestselling author who has sold a total of 14.5 million copies. Distressed, Masamune confides in Sagiri about their financial crisis of finding a new editorial company, and how he had promised his aunt to regularly publish books so that the siblings can continue their present way of life. While searching for editorial companies with Elf, Masamune meets a strange girl in a kimono who accompanies them as Masamune goes to consult Ayame. Ayame tells Masamune about a competition between five authors who compete for a publishing spot, and the winner has their short story published in September. After Masamune eagerly signs up, Muramasa, who happens to be the girl in the kimono, arrives and signs up for the competition as well, and declares to Masamune that she will defeat him and crush his dreams.
| 7 | "Little Sister and the Most Interesting Novel in the World"; Transliteration: "Imōto to Sekai de Ichiban Omoshiroi Shōsetsu" (Japanese: 妹と世界で一番面白い小説) | May 21, 2017 |
An aggravated Masamune declares that whoever wins the publishing spot can then give any order to the loser, to which Muramasa happily agrees. Masamune and Sagiri get to work together, with Masamune asking Elf for help writing a short story less than 60 pages, and Sagiri starting on her erotic art. After four days of training, and two days left before the deadline, Muramasa visits Masamune, and attempts to convince him to surrender and instead write novels for her, as well as explaining her past. Muramasa never found any novel interesting from the bottom of her heart, so she decided to write one herself for her to read. So far, there had only been one book that interested her, which was what Masamune wrote, and she wants to defeat Masamune as she cannot forgive him for starting a new romantic comedy series. Muramasa goes on to explain her dream, which took root when her first ever fan letter gave her book a one million score out of a hundred, and from then on Muramasa had been desperately creating a novel that she could find truly interesting and give herself a one million score out of a hundred. Afterwards, Sagiri appears and declares to Muramasa that Masamune is her brother and refuses to give him away. Masamune then rejects Muramasa, who leaves with her promise of defeating Masamune. On the day of the competition, Muramasa ends up being disqualified due to her manuscript exceeding the page limit, and Masamune wins. Muramasa confesses her love for Masamune, but he politely declines. Later on, Masamune receives a letter from Muramasa, who encloses her favorite notebook and a note describing how interesting his novel was and that she would give him a score of one million out of one hundred.
| 8 | "Dreaming Sagiri and Summer Fireworks"; Transliteration: "Yumemiru Sagiri to Natsu Hanabi" (Japanese: 夢見る紗霧と夏花火) | May 28, 2017 |
Masamune finds Sagiri in a yukata, and deduces that she wants to see the fireworks but doesn't want to leave her room either. He invites Elf, Muramasa, and the 3rd place author of the competition, Kunimitsu Shidō, for an after-party at his house. After the party, the three authors go out to watch the fireworks, but Masamune chooses to stay with Sagiri in her room as they watch it from her room instead.
| 9 | "Little Sister and Fairy Island"; Transliteration: "Imōto to Yōsei no Shima" (Japanese: 妹と妖精の島) | June 4, 2017 |
During the after-party at Masamune's house, Elf invites Masamune, Muramasa and Kunimitsu to travel to "Fairy Island", a southern island owned by the Yamada family with "writing camp" as an excuse. When Elf and the company land on the island, they meets Chris Yamada, Elf's older brother and her executive editor. At "Fairy Island", Masamune is rewarded with more writing material, but is also confronted by Elf and Chris about marriage into the Yamada family. Elf, as a show of trust and as an 'in-case' of proposal, reveals her true name to be Emily.
| 10 | "Masamune Izumi and the Younger Senpai"; Transliteration: "Izumi Masamune to Toshishita no Senpai" (Japanese: 和泉マサムネと年下の先輩) | June 11, 2017 |
Masamune promises to Muramasa that he will write an after-story to the Silverwolf of Reincarnation series and give it to her, which she finds incredibly interesting and touching. Meanwhile, Elf takes the opportunities without her brother's constant supervision to play games that often involve the two girls fighting for Masamune's attention. During the trip, Muramasa becomes embarrassed with confessing her love for Masamune in public, and later declares that she will not write stories anymore as she had fulfilled her dream of reading a story she could give a one million score out of a hundred, which were Masamune's books. Later that day, Masamune shows Muramasa one of the latest fan letters written by a middle-school girl named Hana Umezono. He tells her that the girl's letters were always highly passionate and that they always encouraged him especially. Masamune then reveals that Muramasa was the one behind all those letters by pairing up their handwriting, which she confirms, and explains that while her current dream is fulfilled, she should keep striving to fulfill other dreams she has by continuing to write. Muramasa changes her mind and decides that her next dream will be to start a relationship with Masamune.
| 11 | "How the Two Met and Future Siblings"; Transliteration: "Futari no Deai to Mirai no Futari" (Japanese: 二人の出会いと未来の兄妹(ふたり)) | June 18, 2017 |
Back from the trip, Masamune decides to set off to Akihabara to watch the debut of his and Sagiri's new work while talking with her via VOIP. During the way, both of them recall their past. Masamune reminisces about the time when he wrote his first novel and published it online in a bid to occupy himself after his mother's death. At that time, seven-year-old Sagiri, who was an avid fan of his work, provided him with illustrations for the series while not revealing her identity to him. Masamune and Sagiri's interactions inspired each other to follow their careers as writer and illustrator respectively, and Sagiri decided to cease her conversations with him and dedicate herself to be a professional. Once reaching Akihabara, Masamune is apprehensive about the reception of the book, until he is reassured when a group of characters from Oreimo pass by while praising it. Upon returning home, Masamune is surprised upon seeing Sagiri out of her room and she reveals that she is training herself to eventually become able to leave home. The two then renew their promise to move forward and make their dreams come true, together.
| 12 | "Eromanga Festival"; Transliteration: "Eromanga Fesutibaru" (Japanese: エロマンガフェスティバル) | June 25, 2017 |
Elf and Muramasa arrive at Masamune's house to fulfill their part of her bargain with Sagiri, that she would allow Masamune to go with them for the trip in exchange to have both pose for her. As Sagiri draws with the two posing as models, Tomoe arrives at Masamune's home and delivers him a copy of an erotic doujinshi that is inspired on his most recent work. Sagiri arrives and snatches the book from Masamune and after reading it, is determined to make her own version of it. After reading Sagiri's version, Masamune realizes that the main character's penis was incorrectly drawn, but is too embarrassed to explain it to Sagiri. He then calls Megumi for help to no avail, and Muramasa shows the others a sketch of Michelangelo's David Sculpture to prove Masamune's point. The episode ends as Elf and Muramasa leave, with Masamune watching in joy as Sagiri waves goodbye at them to see them off.
| OVA–1 | "Elf Yamada's Love Song"; Transliteration: "Yamada Erufu no Rabu Songu" (Japanese: 山田エルフのラブソング) | January 16, 2019 |
| OVA–2 | "Sagiri Izumi's First Kiss"; Transliteration: "Izumi Sagiri no Fāsuto Kisu" (Japanese: 和泉紗霧のファーストキス) | January 16, 2019 |

== Reception ==
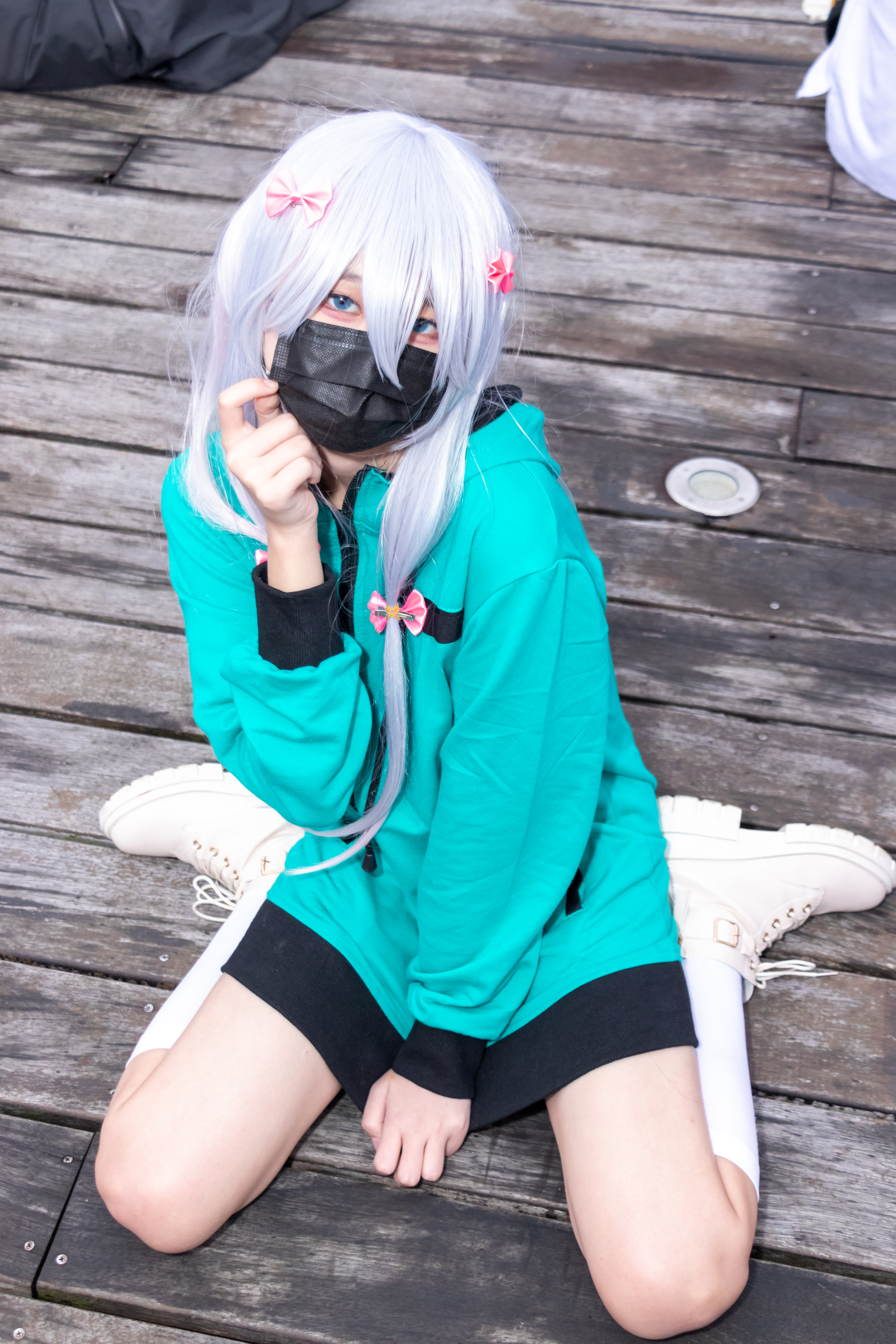
Cosplay of Sagiri Izumi at Fancy Frontier 40

The light novel had a million copies in print as of April 2017.

Reviewing Eromanga Sensei, THEM Anime Reviews wrote that between the two principal female characters featured in the series besides Sagiri, Elf is the "better one" compared to Muramasa. The website also wrote, "Elf, like Masamune, is a 'light novelist', and she's apparently much more successful at it than he is. She goofs off most of the time, only doing actual writing when the mood strikes her. Elf is also a bit of an egomaniac- though in fairness, she DOES have a nice smile- and at the beginning of the show she moves in next door to Masamune. Of course she comes to love him- ALL the girls in this show love him. She at least does exhibit flashes of self-awareness, and even humor."

== See also ==
- Oreimo – A light novel series by the same authors.
