= Pseudo- =

Greek prefix: false

Pseudo- (from Greek: ψευδής, pseudḗs 'false') is a prefix used in a number of languages, often to mark something as a fake or insincere version.

In English, the prefix is used on both nouns and adjectives. It can be considered a privative prefix specifically denoting disproximation, i.e. that the resulting word refers to something that has moved away from the core meaning of the base that the prefix is added to. The meaning is the same in French and Greek, but in Greek it also attaches to other word classes such as verbs and adverbs.
