= Tsukasa Fushimi =

Japanese author of light novels (born 1981)

- Born: 1981 (age 44–45); Japan
- Occupation: Author
- Writing career
- Pen name: Tsukasa Fushimi (伏見 つかさ, Fushimi Tsukasa)
- Notable works: Oreimo; Eromanga Sensei
- Website: fusi.blog10.fc2.com

Tsukasa Fushimi (伏見 つかさ, Fushimi Tsukasa; born 1981) is a Japanese author of light novels. He made his debut in 2006 with the novel series Jūsanbanme no Alice. This was followed in 2008 by his well-known novel series Oreimo, which spawned a media franchise encompassing multiple manga, anime, and video game adaptations. In 2013, Fushimi began writing his novel series Eromanga Sensei which ended in 2022.

== Career ==
Originally from Chiba, Tsukasa Fushimi entered the first volume of Jūsanbanme no Alice into the 12th Dengeki Novel Prize in 2005. While the work did not win a prize, it survived through the third selection process and was ultimately published by ASCII Media Works under their Dengeki Bunko imprint in 2006 as Fushimi's debut work. Following the end of Jūsanbanme no Alice with volume four in 2007, Fushimi began writing the first novel of Oreimo, published in 2008. Fushimi would go on to write 12 volumes in total of Oreimo, ending in 2013. Over the course of the series, Oreimo spawned a media franchise encompassing multiple manga, anime and video game adaptations. Fushimi began his next novel series Eromanga Sensei in 2013.

== Writing style ==
His debut work, Jūsanbanme no Alice, despite depicting a violent conflict between two of the female leads, Fushimi's editor Kazuma Miki has said that he enjoys the everyday comedy found within Fushimi's work, and how amusing the male characters within his work interact with one another. According to Miki, Fushimi is a writer who initially keeps backstory and setting to a minimum, and only after receiving feedback from his editors and readers does he integrate it into his work.

Fushimi has stated that he prefers tall female characters, and that the height of the characters in his writings is a reflection of this. In particular, Fushimi cites Saori Makishima, a 180 centimeters tall junior high school girl character in Oreimo, as his favorite character. Fushimi states, however, that he does not give preferential treatment to characters based on his personal tastes. For example, he revealed that he intentionally depicted the central heroine of Oreimo, Kirino Kōsaka, as a detestable person.

Fushimi has also stated that Kirino is a character he dislikes but needs to be there to "pull the story along", and he also revealed his personal theory that the critical evaluation of characters from readers also reveals how well they made an impression. When analyzing reader surveys, Fushimi says that he judges the popularity of certain characters by counting negative reviews as half as much as a positive review, and explains that characters with different likes and dislikes can be turned into favorable results if handled well.

In Oreimo, the story is focused on the relationship between a brother and a sister, and within the work, the main character repeatedly complains about the hardships of having a sister and hopes that the reader would agree with him. However, Fushimi says that he himself does not have a sister and that this aspect of the character was purely drawn from his imagination.

== Works ==
Light novels

- ASCII Media Works
  - Jūsanbanme no Alice (十三番目のアリス; illustrations by Sikorsky) (2006–2007, 4 volumes)
  - Oreimo (俺の妹がこんなに可愛いわけがない, Ore no Imōto ga Konna ni Kawaii Wake ga Nai; illustrations by Hiro Kanzaki) (2008–2013, 2019–2021, 17 volumes)
  - Neko Sis (ねこシス; illustrations by Hiro Kanzaki) (2009, 1 volume)
  - Eromanga Sensei (エロマンガ先生; illustrations by Hiro Kanzaki) (2013–2022, 13 volumes)
  - Watashi no Hatsukoi wa Hazukashisugite Dare ni mo Ienai (私の初恋は恥ずかしすぎて誰にも言えない, illustrations by Hiro Kanzaki) (2024–present)
- Visual Art's / Paradigm
  - Meitantei Shikkaku na Kanojo (名探偵失格な彼女; illustrations by Eran Hasumi) (2008, 1 volume)
- Square Enix
  - Chūnibyō de Go!! (中二病でGO!!) (2009, co-authored short story anthology)
- Ichijinsha
  - School Heart's Tsuki to Hanabi to Yakusoku to (School Heart's 月と花火と約束と) (2008, co-authored short story anthology)

Visual novels

- Meitantei Shikkaku na Kanojo (名探偵失格な彼女) by Issue (Visual Art's) (2009)

Video game

- Gakuen Idolmaster
