= Television Hokkaido =

Television station in Sapporo, Japan

JOHI-DTV

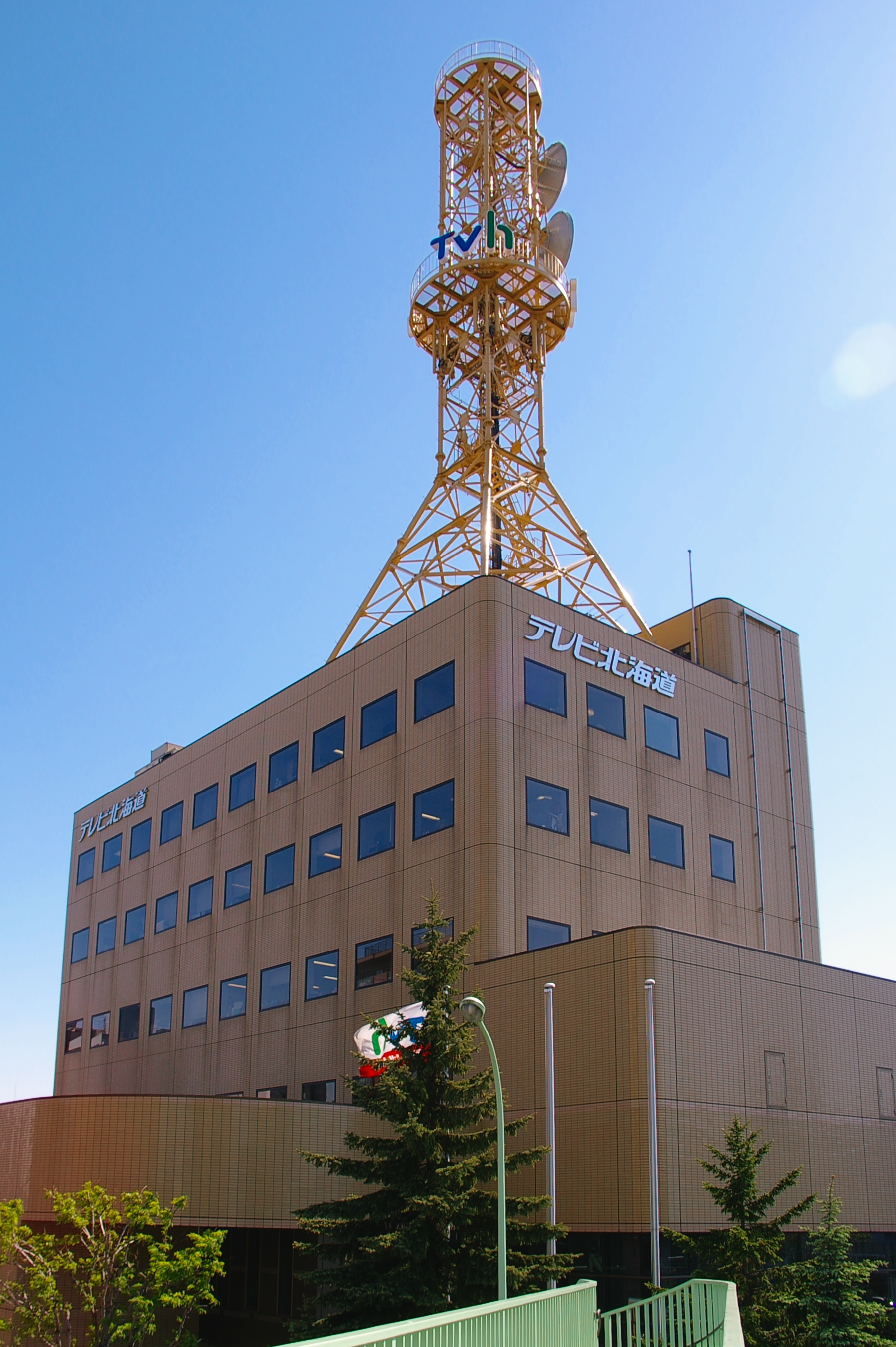
- Headquarters in Odori Park, Chuo, Sapporo
- Hokkaido; Japan
- City: Sapporo
- Channels: Digital: 14 (UHF); Virtual: 7
- Branding: TVh; Television Hokkaido

Programming
- Language: Japanese
- Affiliations: TX Network

Ownership
- Owner: Television Hokkaido Broadcasting Co., Ltd.

History
- Founded: August 24, 1988
- First air date: October 1, 1989
- Former call signs: JOHI-TV (1989-2011)
- Former channel numbers: 17 (UHF, analog, 1989–2011)
- Call sign meaning: H and I from Hokkaido

Technical information
- Licensing authority: MIC

Links
- Website: https://www.tv-hokkaido.co.jp/

Television Hokkaido Broadcasting Co., Ltd. (株式会社テレビ北海道, Kabushiki-gaisha Terebi Hokkaidō; TVh), callsigns JOHI-DTV (channel 7) is a Japanese television station based in Sapporo serving as the affiliate of the TX Network for Hokkaido. TVh started broadcasting in 1989. Nikkei, Inc. is the biggest shareholder of TVh.

== History ==
In June 1985, Yoshiro Ito, the then president of Ito-gumi Civil Engineering, requested the release of the Shintai license from the Postal Ministry on behalf of the Sapporo City financial circle. In December of the same year, the Ministry of Post and Telecommunications issued the policy of establishing four private television stations nationwide and five private television stations in central cities in the north and south of Japan. The environment for the establishment of the fifth private television station in Hokkaido gradually matured. In 1986, the Postal Ministry released the fifth private television license in Hokkaido, attracting 176 companies to apply. Under the adjustment of Hokkaido's financial circles, these applications were consolidated into TV Hokkaido. In June 1988, TV Hokkaido obtained a television broadcasting license, held a founding meeting on August 22 of the same year, and was officially established on August 24. The headquarters of TV Hokkaido were built on land provided by Ito Group Civil Engineering. Construction started on September 3, 1988 and was completed on August 24, 1989. The land where TV Hokkaido's signal transmitting station is located in Mount Teine was built on land owned by Oji Paper.

TV Hokkaido officially launched at 6 a.m. on October 1, 1989, covering 52.5% of households in Hokkaido. Due to the vast area of Hokkaido and the large number of transmitting stations, TV Hokkaido could not afford the expenses of setting up stations in sparsely populated areas in the prefecture's northeast. These stations weren't built in the analog age, but did not cover all of Hokkaido until after the analog signals were turned off. On September 21, 1991, TV Hokkaido established a broadcast station in Asahikawa, increasing TV Hokkaido's household coverage rate in the prefecture to 62.7%. TV Hokkaido continued to set up new broadcast stations in Muroran and Hakodate in 1993, allowing 80.7% of Hokkaido households to watch TV Hokkaido's programs. That year, TV Hokkaido’s average ratings during the prime time period (19:00 to 22:00) reached 9%, and the average ratings during the evening period (19:00 to 23:00) reached 8%, setting the highest record since the launch. On the eve of the 10th anniversary of the founding in 1998, TV Hokkaido held the largest flea market event in North Japan.

In response to the demand for digital TV broadcasts, TV Hokkaido introduced high-definition TV program production equipment in 2004, allowing Studio 1 to produce high-definition programs. On June 1, 2006, TV Hokkaido started broadcasting digital television signals. On the same day, TV Hokkaido also broadcast special programs with five other TV stations in Hokkaido to increase awareness of digital TV. The following year, TV Hokkaido's Asahikawa, Muroran, and Hakodate broadcast stations were also digitized. Also in 2006 and 2007, TV Hokkaido's average daily ratings reached 4.1%, setting the highest record since its launch.

On July 24, 2011, TV Hokkaido stopped broadcasting analog TV signals and fully entered the digital TV era. In the same year, TV Hokkaido set up broadcast stations in Kushiro, Obihiro, Kitami, and Abashiri, marking that the eastern area can also start to watch TV Hokkaido's programs. In 2014, TV Hokkaido opened broadcast stations in Wakkanai. Broadcasting stations were set up in Nemuro City and other places, allowing TV Hokkaido to successfully cover basically all households in Hokkaido 26 years after its launch.

In order to expand advertising revenue, TV Hokkaido also has branches in Tokyo and Osaka. In 2010, TV Hokkaido established a branch in Fukuoka City to develop the Kyushu market.
