= Kimi no Shiranai Monogatari =

Single by Supercell

from the album Today Is a Beautiful Day
- Released: August 12, 2009
- Recorded: 2009
- Genre: J-pop; pop rock
- Length: 5:40
- Label: Sony Music
- Songwriter: Ryo
- Producer: Ryo

Supercell singles chronology
"Melt" (2007)	"Kimi no Shiranai Monogatari" (2009)	"Sayonara Memories" (2010)

"Kimi no Shiranai Monogatari" (君の知らない物語; lit. 'The Story You Don't Know') is a J-pop song by the Japanese band Supercell, written by Ryo. Supercell released it as their major label debut single in August 2009 by Sony Music. The title track was the ending theme song to the 2009 Bakemonogatari anime series, and the B-side track "Love & Roll" was the theme song for the 2009 Cencoroll anime film. A music video was produced for "Kimi no Shiranai Monogatari", directed by Hirohisa Sasaki. Lyrically, the song deals with an unrequited love.

This single was the first release by Supercell which did not use the Vocaloid singing synthesizer Hatsune Miku as the vocalist, as they had done for their debut album Supercell (2009). Instead, Supercell employed the singer Nagi Yanagi, a vocalist who had previously submitted cover versions of songs to the Nico Nico Douga video sharing website under the name Gazelle. The single peaked at No. 5 on Japan's weekly Oricon singles chart, and in February 2010 was awarded a Gold Disc by the Recording Industry Association of Japan for having exceeded 100,000 copies shipped in a single year.

== Background ==
During the production of the 2009 anime series Bakemonogatari, Supercell was asked to compose what would later become the ending theme song "Kimi no Shiranai Monogatari". It was already decided that Supercell would release their debut album Supercell in March 2009, which used the Vocaloid singing synthesizer Hatsune Miku as the vocalist. In place of Miku, Supercell employed the singer Nagi Yanagi, a vocalist who had previously submitted cover versions of songs to the Nico Nico Douga video sharing website under the name Gazelle. "Kimi no Shiranai Monogatari" was the first release by Supercell to not use Miku as the vocalist. Yanagi was chosen for "Kimi no Shiranai Monogatari" by Ryo, who had been a fan of her voice even before uploading his own songs to Nico Nico Douga in late 2007. Roughly the next day after Ryo uploaded Supercell's first song "Melt" onto Nico Nico Douga in December 2007, Yanagi uploaded a cover of her singing the song. Yanagi, who was herself a fan of Ryo's music, contacted him and the two talked about someday collaborating.

After asking Yanagi to be the singer for "Kimi no Shiranai Monogatari", Supercell decided that Yanagi would be the singer for Supercell's second album Today Is A Beautiful Day (2011), though officially Yanagi is not a member of Supercell. In switching to a human singer, Ryo said "that although he loses absolute control over the tone of each and every phrase, working with a singer adds a human element that resonates better with listeners." After Ryo used Hatsune Miku for the demo of "Kimi no Shiranai Monogatari", he thought the vocal range would wear out any human singer, but was pleased to find Yanagi had just as wide a vocal range as Miku. After listening to Yanagi sing the song, Ryo realized just how difficult it was to sing, but he did not deliberately change the song during the creation process to make it easier on Yanagi's voice.

== Composition ==
"Kimi no Shiranai Monogatari"
A 30-second sample from "Kimi no Shiranai Monogatari", featuring Nagi Yanagi singing the beginning of the second verse, which mentions the Summer Triangle.

"Kimi no Shiranai Monogatari" is a J-pop song with instrumentation from electric and bass guitars, drums and piano. According to a book of sheet music published by Yamaha Corporation, it is set in common time, and moves at a quick tempo of 165 beats per minute in the A major key throughout the song. The introduction starts with only piano accompanying Yanagi's vocals, and uses a bridge with added guitars and drums to transition into the first verse. Another bridge is used between the first and second verses; both verses use the same music with different lyrics. After the third verse, a break is employed, followed by the fourth verse. After a short outro, an instrumental coda is used to close the song. When writing the lyrics, Ryo did not want to copy the tone or style of the original Bakemonogatari novels, because he felt the author Nisio Isin would enjoy the song more if it was more original. Thus, Ryo wrote a different story after borrowing the general setting of the novels. The lyrics tell the story of a girl with an unrequited love who was never able to convey her feelings to the person she loved.

The cover artwork features an illustration by Shirow Miwa with the Summer Triangle depicted in the starry sky. The Summer Triangle is mentioned in the second verse of the song and stargazing in general is featured throughout the lyrics. The art direction and designs were handled by Yoshiki Usa. Before designing the cover, Ryo had Miwa and Usa listen to the song and told them the image of it in a word or two, but otherwise gave them full freedom to design the artwork.

== Release and reception ==
"Kimi no Shiranai Monogatari" was released in limited and regular editions on August 12, 2009, as a CD by Sony Music in Japan. The limited edition came bundled with a DVD containing the music video and TV commercial advertisement for "Kimi no Shiranai Monogatari", as well as bundled with stickers featuring characters from Bakemonogatari illustrated by Redjuice of Supercell. The song peaked at No. 5 on Japan's weekly Oricon singles chart, selling over 30,000 copies in its first week of sales. It stayed in the top 10 for the following week, peaking at No. 6, and charted for 66 weeks. "Kimi no Shiranai Monogatari" debuted and peaked on the Billboard Japan Hot 100 at No. 9. In January 2010, "Kimi no Shiranai Monogatari" was certified gold by the Recording Industry Association of Japan (RIAJ) for 100,000 full-track ringtone digital music downloads (Chaku Uta Full), and was again awarded a Gold Disc by the RIAJ in February 2010 for having exceeded 100,000 copies shipped in a single year.

== Music video ==
Kitade, Tanabe and Fukunaga (respectively) gaze up at the Summer Triangle with Inubōsaki lighthouse in the background in the music video.

The music video was shot in Chōshi, Chiba, Japan. Tokawa Station on the Chōshi Electric Railway Line and Inubōsaki lighthouse can be seen in the video. The video, directed by Hirohisa Sasaki, does not feature any members of Supercell nor the singer Nagi Yanagi. Instead, the video prominently follows the actors Marika Fukunaga, Shuto Tanabe and Naho Kitade, who play members of a high school astronomy club with five others. Fukunaga, Tanabe and Kitade are in a love triangle where Fukunaga initially holds feelings for Tanabe, who pursues a relationship with Kitade. Time passes in the video, going through summer vacation and eventually graduation. As a parting gift, Tanabe gives Fukunaga his address, written on an ice cream stick, to where he is moving to in Tokyo, and he parts with Kitade at the train station, hinting that he broke off his relationship with Kitade to possibly start over with Fukunaga. More time passes, and Fukunaga is shown throwing the ice cream stick into the ocean after being reminded of the time she spent with Tanabe. The video ends with a flashback showing Fukunaga, Tanabe and Kitade happily gazing at the Summer Triangle at Inubōsaki lighthouse. The Summer Triangle is shown twice in the video as an allusion to the beginning of the second verse of the song which mentions it.

== Track listing ==
All tracks are written by Ryo.

No.	Title	Length
1.	"Kimi no Shiranai Monogatari" (君の知らない物語)	5:40
2.	"Love & Roll"	4:53
3.	"Theme of 'Cencoroll'"	1:24
4.	"Kimi no Shiranai Monogatari (TV Edit)" (君の知らない物語 -TV Edit-)	1:29
5.	"Kimi no Shiranai Monogatari (Instrumental)" (君の知らない物語 -Instrumental-)	5:40

== Personnel ==
Supercell

- Ryo – writer
- Yoshiki Usa – art direction, design
- Shirow Miwa – illustrations
- Redjuice – illustrations

Additional musicians

- Nagi Yanagi – vocals
- Susumu Nishikawa – guitar
- Okiya Okoshi – guitar
- Hiroo Yamaguchi – bass
- Yuichi Takama – bass
- Tom Tamada – drums
- Shunsuke Watanabe – piano

Production

- Shunsuke Muramatsu – executive producer
- Yu Tamura – executive producer
- Eiji "Q" Makino – mixer
- Koji Morimoto – mixer
- Yuji Chinone – mastering
- Masami Hatta – products coordination
- Eiichi Maruyama – director
- Taishi Fukuyama – vocal direction
- Madoka Yanagi – A&R

== Charts ==
Weekly chart (2009)	Peak position
Japan Billboard Japan Hot 100	9
Japan Oricon Weekly Singles	5

Yearly chart (2017)	Peak position
Billboard Japan Streaming	78
