= Zigaexperientia =

Studio album by Supercell
- Released: November 27, 2013
- Recorded: 2011−2013
- Genre: J-pop
- Length: 71:32
- Label: SME
- Producer: Ryo

Supercell chronology
Today Is A Beautiful Day (2011)	Zigaexperientia (2013)

Singles from Zigaexperientia
- 1. "My Dearest" Released: November 23, 2011; 2. "Kokuhaku" Released: March 7, 2012; 3. "Bokura no Ashiato" Released: March 7, 2012; 4. "Gin'iro Hikōsen" Released: December 19, 2012; 5. "The Bravery" Released: March 13, 2013; 6. "Hakushukassai Utaawase" Released: June 12, 2013

Zigaexperientia is the third and final studio album by the Japanese J-pop band Supercell, released on November 27, 2013 by SME. The album contains 15 music tracks written by Ryo, and sung by Koeda, though officially Koeda is not a member of Supercell. Six of the tracks were previously released on five of Supercell's singles. Three different editions of the album were released: a regular CD version, a CD+DVD limited edition, and a CD+BD limited edition. Zigaexperientia peaked at No. 7 on the Japanese Oricon weekly albums chart.

Seven of the songs were used as theme songs for various media: "My Dearest" and "Kokuhaku" were used as theme songs for the 2011 anime television series Guilty Crown; "Hakushukassai Utaawase" was used as the opening theme for the 2013 rebroadcast of the 2010 anime series Katanagatari; "Yeah Oh Ahhh Oh!" was used in a television commercial for the vocational school HAL; "Gin'iro Hikōsen" was the theme song to the 2012 anime film Nerawareta Gakuen; "The Bravery" was used as the second ending theme to the 2012 anime series Magi: The Labyrinth of Magic; and "Bokura no Ashiato" was used as the ending theme to the 2012 anime series Black Rock Shooter.

== Production ==
Between 2009 and 2011, Nagi Yanagi provided the vocals for Supercell's releases, ending with Supercell's second studio album Today Is A Beautiful Day (2011). Following this, Supercell held auditions from May 25 to June 19, 2011 for the vocalist on the band's third album. The main criteria for the vocalist was his or her voice, as Supercell was not concerned with the singer's gender or age. Out of about 2,000 candidates, then 15-year-old female singer Koeda was chosen. Ryo began by thinking about what kind of melody would fit Koeda's aggressive voice. He brought together various guitars and sound effectors and started composing music for the album once he found the desired timbre using drop D tuning, which also influenced the writing of the lyrics. Ryo was partially influenced by watching Pink Floyd's Live at Pompeii concert film and bought a vintage Marshall guitar amp after seeing it used in the film. Ryo also cited Muse as an influence, wanting to make music that makes people smile. According to Ryo, the album's title is a portmanteau of the Japanese word for ego, jiga (自我) (or ziga in kunrei or nihon romanization), and the Latin word for experience, experientia.

=== Artwork ===
The limited editions of Zigaexperientia came bundled with a 38-page full-color illustration booklet titled Supercell Works 3. The booklet contains color illustrations for the songs including lyrics, as well as comments by Ryo and Koeda, and production photos. The albums' packaging, designed by Yoshiki Usa, includes the song lyrics and the illustrations featured in Supercell Works 3. Excluding the final track "We're Still Here", each song is given an illustration by one of four artists, three of whom are members of Supercell. These illustrators are listed below with the track listing. The cover art is a black and white illustration by Shirow Miwa and shows a barefoot girl in a white dress and jacket holding a traffic sign shaped like a triangular yield sign on a black background.

== Release and reception ==
Zigaexperientia was released on November 27, 2013 in three editions: a regular CD version, a CD+DVD limited edition, and a CD+BD limited edition. The DVD and BD contained music videos of the songs "My Dearest", "Hakushukassai Utaawase", "Gin'iro Hikōsen", "The Bravery", "Bokura no Ashiato", "Kokuhaku", and "No.525300887039". For the week of November 25, 2013 on Oricon's weekly albums chart, Zigaexperientia was reported to have sold over 26,000 copies in its first week of sales, peaking at No. 7, and charted for 13 weeks.

== Track listing ==
All tracks are written by Ryo.

No.	Title	Illustrator	Length
1.	"Journey's End"	Huke	1:49
2.	"No.525300887039"	Huke	5:56
3.	"Mr.Downer"	Huke	4:11
4.	"My Dearest (Album Mix)"	Redjuice	5:36
5.	"Jūzoku Ningen" (従属人間 Dependent Human)	Redjuice	3:34
6.	"White Seiyaku" (ホワイト製薬 White Drug)	Redjuice	3:20
7.	"Hakushukassai Utaawase" (拍手喝采歌合 Applause Singing Contest)	Shirow Miwa	3:58
8.	"Yeah Oh Ahhh Oh!"	Shirow Miwa	3:41
9.	"Hyakukaime no Kiss" (百回目のキス 100th Kiss)	Atsuya Uki	4:46
10.	"Gin'iro Hikōsen" (銀色飛行船 Silver Blimp)	Shirow Miwa	7:03
11.	"The Bravery (Album Mix)"	Shirow Miwa	6:04
12.	"Bokura no Ashiato (Album Mix)" (僕らのあしあと Our Footprints)	Huke	7:07
13.	"Kokuhaku (Album Mix)" (告白 Confession)	Redjuice	5:26
14.	"Jikan Ressha" (時間列車 Time Train)	Atsuya Uki	3:56
15.	"We're Still Here"	no illustration	5:11
Total length:			71:38

=== Music videos ===
No.	Title	Director	Length
1.	"My Dearest"	Ryūji Seki	5:36
2.	"Kokuhaku" (告白 Confession)	Ryūji Seki	5:26
3.	"Bokura no Ashiato" (僕らのあしあと Our Footprints)	Ryūji Seki	7:07
4.	"Gin'iro Hikōsen" (銀色飛行船 Silver Blimp)	Kazuaki Seki	7:03
5.	"The Bravery"	Kazuaki Seki	6:04
6.	"Hakushukassai Utaawase" (拍手喝采歌合 Applause Singing Contest)	Hideaki Fukui	3:58
7.	"No.525300887039"	Kazuaki Seki	5:56

== Personnel ==
Supercell

- Ryo – writer
- Shirow Miwa – cover illustration, illustrations
- Redjuice – illustrations
- Huke – illustrations
- Yoshiki Usa – creative direction

Additional musicians

- Koeda – vocals, chorus

Production

- Shunsuke Muramatsu – executive producer
- Yū Tamura – executive producer
- Takayuki Ishiyama – director
- Keisuke Fujimaki – mixer
- Shunroku Hitani – mixer
- Ted Jensen – mastering
- Crusher Kimura – strings arrangement
- Yōko Sakurai – product coordination
- Rei Nara – artist management
- Mami Kumagawa – artist management
