= Utaite =

Japanese term for Internet cover singers

Utaite (歌い手) is a Japanese term for amateur singers who post covers on the Internet, especially on sites like Niconico and YouTube. The term utattemita (歌ってみた; lit. 'I tried singing') refers to the genre and culture surrounding covers by utaite, as well as to the cover songs themselves, and is often put into the titles of such videos.

== Background ==
Although utaite can refer to any amateur cover singer on the Internet, the term is closely associated with the Vocaloid scene, and there is much overlap between these cultures; they are said to have grown alongside each other. Some famous utaite even double as Vocaloid producers and songwriters themselves, such as Mafumafu and Eve. Many, but not all, utaite do not show their face online, and instead use a character to represent them. Many utaite have gone on to reveal their identity, sign to major labels, and distance themselves from the utaite label to become mainstream artists in Japan; however, increasingly, utaite like Ado have been able to enjoy mainstream success while still maintaining their anonymous persona, and continue to be involved with utaite culture. Utaite groups have also been popular in recent years, a notable example being Strawberry Prince.

Utaite became increasingly popular after the release of the Vocaloid library Hatsune Miku on August 31, 2007. The release of "Melt" (メルト, Meruto) by Ryo on Nico Nico Douga in December 2007 played a significant role in boosting the utaite community after the song was covered by numerous utaite including halyosy and Gazelle.

Part of the reason why Vocaloid songs are so often covered by utaite is because the complexity of Vocaloid songs, often written to take advantage of the inhuman capabilities of synthesized vocals, provide a challenge to human singers, and allows them to demonstrate their singing skills. Also, many Vocaloid producers choose to make the instrumental versions of their songs readily available on sites such as Piapro, allowing and directly encouraging utaite to use them for covers.

== Etymology ==
The word utaite (歌い手), although literally translating as "singer", has a meaning distinct from kashu (歌手), the typical word in Japanese for a professional singer. Utaite refers more broadly to "a person who sings" or "the person who is singing something"; i.e. not necessarily someone who sings as a line of work. Because of this, the word was adopted by amateur cover singers on the Internet to distinguish themselves from kashu, to avoid presenting themselves as on the same scale or skill level as a professional. This usage stuck, and the term utaite is now widely understood in Japanese as a specific reference to this subculture of online cover singers, typically of Vocaloid songs.

== Youtaite ==
Youtaite is a term for a utaite who is not Japanese, and also refers to the larger international offshoot of the main utaite culture in Japan. Youtaite typically adopt many of the same characteristics as their Japanese counterparts, such as not showing their face and using a persona; they may cover Japanese-language Vocaloid songs using the original lyrics despite not being able to speak the language, or they may write translated lyrics ("translyrics") to sing in their own language. An example of a famous youtaite who covers Vocaloid songs in English is JubyPhonic.

The "you" in "youtaite" derives from YouTube; in the earlier days, many Japanese utaite exclusively posted to the Japanese site Nico Nico Douga, and so English-speaking utaite, who used YouTube instead, created this portmanteau as a designation for themselves. Although most Japanese utaite now also post to YouTube, this naming convention is still very common as a way to refer to utaite in the English-speaking or otherwise international scene. The term "youtaite" does not exist in Japanese; youtaite are instead simply referred to as kaigai no utaite (海外の歌い手; (lit. overseas utaite), gaikokujin no utaite (外国人の歌い手; lit. foreigner utaite), or other such terms.

== See also ==
- Vocaloid
- Category:Utaite
- User-generated content
