= Owari no Hoshi no Love Song =

Studio album by Jun Maeda, Nagi Yanagi
- Released: April 25, 2012
- Genre: J-pop
- Length: 69:33
- Label: Flaming June
- Producer: Jun Maeda

Singles from Owari no Hoshi no Love Song
- 1. "Killer Song" Released: December 29, 2011

Owari no Hoshi no Love Song (終わりの惑星のLove Song) is a Japanese pop music concept album produced by Jun Maeda featuring vocalist Nagi Yanagi. It was released on April 25, 2012 by Flaming June, an independent record label established by Maeda. Two of the album's thirteen tracks were previously released on the single "Killer Song" at Comiket 81 on December 29, 2011. Two different editions of the album were released: a regular CD version and a CD+DVD limited edition. Owari no Hoshi no Love Song peaked at No. 6 on the Japanese Oricon weekly albums chart.

== Production ==
Before production began on Owari no Hoshi no Love Song, songwriter Jun Maeda of Key had known about Nagi Yanagi through her collaborations with the band Supercell. When Key was developing their visual novel Rewrite (2011), music director Shinji Orito was searching for a singer for two pieces of theme music Orito composed for use in Rewrite. Orito's friend Manyo introduced Yanagi to him, who agreed to collaborate with Key on Rewrite, which is how Maeda met her. Maeda loved Yanagi's voice, and frequently listened to Supercell's album Today Is a Beautiful Day shortly after it was released in 2011. Around that time, Maeda was depressed and thought about what he wanted to do, leading him to want to collaborate with Yanagi. In thinking about what he wanted to do if he could work with Yanagi, he touched on doing a concept album that would make free use of his world view and a series of settings and stories.

Maeda credits Yanagi for being a single ray of hope in the middle of his depression and for giving him something to work towards. Maeda did not expect it would be easy to get her to collaborate with him, but then he saw on her personal website that she was open to offers for work, and he quickly sent Yanagi an email about working together. Yanagi had known about Maeda before they met, she herself being a fan of Key's visual novels Air (2000) and Clannad (2004). Despite Owari no Hoshi no Love Song sharing part of its title with Maeda's previous concept album Love Song (2005), Maeda points out that there is no connection between the two albums.

=== Composition ===
The album's concept is for a set of songs revolving around "worlds that are headed towards destruction". Although Maeda notes that each song is a self-contained story, he aimed for the whole album to have a single overarching story. In mid-2011, Maeda was so enthusiastic about writing the songs that it took him a little less than one month from beginning to end to write all 13 tracks. Maeda spent about three days writing each song: two days for composing the music and one day for writing the lyrics. Maeda had originally wanted to write enough songs for a two-CD album, but he realized that it would take too long to record so many songs. Instead of writing lyrics that would fit with Yanagi's image as a singer, Maeda wanted to take a different approach to writing lyrics than he had done up to that point. This is one reason why he wrote "Killer Song" as a song about killing people. "Kōru Yume" (literally: "Frozen Dream") was Maeda's first attempt at writing a song as a poetry reading because he thought a song like that would be interesting in an album. Instead of writing it as a song, Maeda tried to focus on the mood expressed in the song through diary entries. For the high-tempo songs, Maeda made it a point to overall increase the beats per minute compared to songs he had written up to then.

"Muteki no Soldier"
"Muteki no Soldier" has the highest tempo of any song on the album at 210 beats per minute.

The concept for "Muteki no Soldier" (literally: "Invincible Soldier") was to write a song similar to a battle theme from a role-playing video game during a fight against a boss. When Yanagi first heard "Muteki no Soldier", she did not think someone could sing it because of its high tempo, and its rapid and dense lyrics. When Yanagi tried to practice singing it at home, she would lose her breath trying to keep up with the song. Maeda had thought about removing half the lyrics, but Yanagi was invigorated by the challenge and eventually was able to sing it. During the recording of "Killer Song", one of the first songs to be recorded, Maeda felt that the song improved in unexpected ways. Compared to when Yanagi practiced singing the songs at home, she found different ways to sing them when being directed during the recording sessions. Yanagi felt that the songs required a determined focus, and that if she cut corners even slightly, the songs would end up disjointed.

All of the music was written exclusively by Maeda except for "Hero no Jōken" (literally: "Conditions of a Hero") which was a joint composition with his friend Taisei Nakagawa. An assortment of session musicians perform the songs on the album, including a guitarist, a drummer, two pianists, three violinists, two violists, and a cellist. The Suginami Junior Chorus is credited for the chorus of the song "Kono Hoshi no Birthday Song" (literally: "This World's Birthday Song"), which includes Kōjirou Ōishi, Kazuma Miyajima, Airi Honda, Riko Takao, Hinata Kurioka and Risa Kubo. Owari no Hoshi no Love Song was mixed by Shunroku Hitani, Kentarō Ino, Katsumi Inoue, Kafuka P and Eiichi Nishizawa. Kōtarō Kojima provided the mastering.

=== Artwork ===
The albums' packaging, designed by Minato Kawai of PMMK, includes the song lyrics in Japanese, English, Chinese and Korean. Each song is given an illustration by an artist, and these illustrators are listed below with the track listing. The cover art is by GotoP, and features different art for the limited and regular editions. The limited edition shows a boy in tattered clothes sitting in a forest with his back to a tree, and a girl in a white dress is resting her head on his lap. The regular edition features the same girl as before, but she is now standing in front of a nearly all-white background looking down at some flowers. Maeda handled the art direction.

== Release and reception ==
Prior to the release of the album, the single "Killer Song" was released at Comiket 81 on December 29, 2011. Of the three songs on the single, only "Kimi no Airplane" (きみのairplane) was not later included on the album. Owari no Hoshi no Love Song was released on April 25, 2012 in two editions: a regular CD version and a CD+DVD limited edition. The DVD contained music videos of the songs "Owari no Sekai Kara", "Killer Song", "Muteki no Soldier", "Last Smile" and "Hibukiyama no Mahōtsukai". The album peaked at No. 6 on Oricon's weekly albums chart and charted for five weeks. Owari no Hoshi no Love Song debuted at No. 1 on the Billboard Top Independent Albums and Singles chart.

== Track listing ==
All tracks are written by Jun Maeda, except where noted.

No.	Title	Arrangement / Illustrator	Length
1.	"Owari no Sekai Kara" (終わりの世界から From the World of the End)	Shogo / Yuriko Asami	5:58
2.	"Futari Dake no Ark" (ふたりだけのArk An Ark Just for Two)	Ken Itō / Nanakusa	5:35
3.	"Killer Song"	Takahiro Furukawa / Zen	4:36
4.	"Flower Garden"	Ken Itō / Nanakusa	5:39
5.	"Muteki no Soldier" (無敵のSoldier Invincible Soldier)	Kōichirō Takahashi / Sō Hamayumiba	5:14
6.	"Kōru Yume" (凍る夢 Frozen Dream)	Ken Itō / Juri Misaki	5:11
7.	"Executioner no Koi" (Executionerの恋 The Executioner's Love)	Takahiro Yamada / Na-Ga	4:51
8.	"Toaru Kaizokuō no Kimagure" (とある海賊王の気まぐれ The Whims of a Certain Pirate King)	Masatomo Ōta / Sō Hamayumiba	5:10
9.	"Yuki no Furanai Hoshi" (雪の降らない星 A World With No Snow)	Keiji Inai / Yae	4:57
10.	"Hibukiyama no Mahōtsukai" (火吹き山の魔法使い The Sorcerer of the Volcano)	Yuyoyuppe / Zen	4:37
11.	"Last Smile"	Keiji Inai / Yae	6:20
12.	"Hero no Jōken" (Heroの条件 Conditions of a Hero) (Joint composition with Taisei Nakagawa)	Tomohiro Nakatsuchi / Zen	5:04
13.	"Kono Hoshi no Birthday Song" (この惑星のBirthday Song This World's Birthday Song)	Ryosuke Nakanishi / GotoP	6:21
Total length:			69:33

Music videos
No.	Title	Length
1.	"Owari no Sekai Kara" (終わりの世界から From the World of the End)	5:58
2.	"Killer Song"	4:36
3.	"Muteki no Soldier" (無敵のSoldier Invincible Soldier)	5:14
4.	"Last Smile"	6:20
5.	"Hibukiyama no Mahōtsukai" (火吹き山の魔法使い The Sorcerer of the Volcano)	4:37

== Personnel ==
Musicians

- Jun Maeda – writer, air director
- Taisei Nakagawa – writer
- Nagi Yanagi – vocals, chorus
- Suginami Junior Chorus
  - Kōjirou Ōishi – chorus
  - Kazuma Miyajima – chorus
  - Airi Honda – chorus
  - Riko Takao – chorus
  - Hinata Kurioka – chorus
  - Risa Kubo – chorus
- Ryō Takahashi – guitar
- Masanori Yabuki – drums
- Keiji Inai – piano
- Effy – piano
- Aya Itō – violin
- Shiori Takeda – violin
- Kōichirō Muroya (credited as Daisensei Muroya) – violin, viola
- Mikiyo Kikuchi – viola
- Masami Horisawa – cello

Production

- Kumiko Takeyama – executive producer
- Yū Tamura – executive producer
- Ken Kobayashi – director
- Kōhei Yamada – director
- Shunroku Hitani – mixer
- Kentarō Ino – mixer
- Katsumi Inoue – mixer
- Kafuka P – mixer
- Eiichi Nishizawa – mixer
- Kōtarō Kojima – mastering
- Shōta Tatano – artist management
- Kosachi Hata – artist management
- Minato Kawai – design
