= Today Is a Beautiful Day =

Today Is A Beautiful Day

Studio album by Supercell
- Released: March 16, 2011
- Recorded: 2009–2010
- Genre: J-pop
- Length: 58:20
- Label: SME
- Producer: Ryo

Supercell chronology
Supercell (2009)	Today Is A Beautiful Day (2011)	Zigaexperientia (2013)

Singles from Today Is A Beautiful Day
- 1. "Kimi no Shiranai Monogatari" Released: August 12, 2009; 2. "Sayonara Memories" Released: February 10, 2010; 3. "Utakata Hanabi" Released: August 25, 2010; 4. "Hoshi ga Matataku Konna Yoru ni" Released: August 25, 2010

Today Is A Beautiful Day is the second studio album by Japanese J-pop band Supercell, released on March 16, 2011 by SME. The album contains 13 music tracks written by Ryo, and sung by Nagi Yanagi, though officially Yanagi is not a member of Supercell. Five of the tracks were previously released on three of Supercell's singles. Two different editions of the album were released: a regular CD version and a CD+DVD limited edition. Today Is A Beautiful Day peaked at No. 3 on the Japanese Oricon weekly albums chart, and in July 2011 was awarded a Gold Disc by the Recording Industry Association of Japan for having exceeded 100,000 copies shipped in a single year.

Five of the songs were used as theme songs for various media: "Kimi no Shiranai Monogatari" was used as the ending theme to the 2009 anime television series Bakemonogatari; "Hero" was the theme song to Shueisha's manga magazine Aoharu, a special edition version of Young Jump; "Love & Roll" was the theme song to the 2009 anime film Cencoroll; "Hoshi ga Matataku Konna Yoru ni" was used as the ending theme to Type-Moon's visual novel Mahōtsukai no Yoru; and "Utakata Hanabi" was used as the 14th ending theme for the Naruto: Shippuden anime series.

== Production ==
Up to and including the release of Supercell's debut album Supercell (2009), songwriter Ryo had been using the Vocaloid singing synthesizer software Hatsune Miku for the vocals of the songs he produced. In transitioning to a human singer, then 21-year-old singer Nagi Yanagi was approached by Ryo to sing the vocals for Supercell's debut single "Kimi no Shiranai Monogatari" (2009). Yanagi had previously submitted cover versions of songs to the Nico Nico Douga video sharing website under the name Gazelle, and Ryo had been a fan of her voice even before uploading his own songs to Nico Nico Douga in late 2007. According to Ryo, other staff members wanted to try having all the songs on the album sung by different artists, but Ryo wanted her for the entire album. Thus, Supercell decided to stick with Yanagi as the vocalist for their second album. The album's title was partially inspired by the 2010 film Confessions and its accompanying theme song "Last Flower" by Radiohead. Ryo was impressed by the melancholic feel of the song in a film that expresses the theme that "life is wonderful", and he wanted to go with a title whose meaning would change depending on how it is perceived. In doing so, Ryo suggests that the title Today Is A Beautiful Day can be taken literally or sarcastically.

=== Composition ===
Ryo likes expressing human emotions in his music, so for Today Is A Beautiful Day, he wanted to combine feelings such as lifelong experiences and memories. He describes the process as expressing each memory as an individual story. Ryo composed the songs on the album around the idea of starting and ending with "Kimi no Shiranai Monogatari" (literally: "The Story You Don't Know"). As such, the second track on the album is "Kimi no Shiranai Monogatari", and the final track "Watashi e" (literally: "To Me") uses the same tune. For "Kimi no Shiranai Monogatari", Ryo was offered to compose the ending theme song to the 2009 anime series Bakemonogatari. Ryo did not want to copy the tone or style of the original Bakemonogatari novels, because he felt the author Nisio Isin would enjoy the song more if it was more original. Thus, Ryo wrote a different story after borrowing the general setting of the novels. While creating the album, Ryo thought it would be interesting if the first song on the album was the end of the story. The album's first track "Owari e Mukau Hajimari no Uta" (literally: "The First Song That Heads Toward the End") was composed with the image of starting with a flashback scene, diving into the past, and once again returning to the present.

For "Hero", Ryo was asked to compose a theme song for Shueisha's manga magazine Aoharu, a special edition version of Young Jump. The artists whose manga would be serialized in Aoharu were asked to draw "heroines they think are cute," and Ryo was asked to compose the song with the same theme. Ryo thought of a boy aiming to be a manga artist as the song's protagonist, and wrote it with the concept of wanting to support those who get victimized for being otaku. Since the song reflects different points of view between the protagonist and the heroine, Nagi Yanagi switches her singing style from cool to cute sounding. Ryo describes "Perfect Day" with an image close to the album title and feels the song symbolizes the album. "Perfect Day" was born from the nuance that undoubtedly tomorrow will be a perfect day.

Ryo wrote the song "Fukushū" (literally: "Revenge") with the theme of anger, and was influenced by "Snow White" to include a line in the song describing someone being told to wear red hot iron shoes and dance. Ryo wanted a song to describe emotions that would continue past adolescence, compared to the rest of the songs on the album. Yanagi found it difficult to capture the right emotions in the song. "Rock 'n' Roll Nan desu no" (literally: This Is Rock 'n' Roll) was composed with a strong drum component as the initial concept and Ryo wanted to create a song with a fast tempo and rock and roll nuance to it; the song's tempo is over 200 beats per minute. Ryo worked in collaboration with Yanagi to write the song based on the initial demo. Ryo did not initially intend on putting "Love & Roll" on the album, but others in the staff convinced him to include it.

For the middle of the album, Ryo wanted a lower tempo song with a different mood and composed "Feel So Good" based on this concept. When it was decided Ryo would compose the theme song to Type-Moon's visual novel Mahōtsukai no Yoru, he first read the original novel by Kinoko Nasu the visual novel is based on to get a feel for the work. Ryo wrote "Hoshi ga Matataku Konna Yoru ni" (literally: "The Stars Twinkle on a Night Like This") for the theme song, and there was not much trial and error in the composition of this song. Fireworks were an influence in the writing of "Utakata Hanabi" (literally: "Bubble Fireworks"). Ryo wanted the song to reflect how fireworks, which are initially brilliant, are hard to vividly remember afterwards. "Yoru ga Akeru yo" (literally: "Dawn Will Break") was the last song on the album Ryo composed, and was born from the feeling of lying in bed being unable to sleep. Ryo was inspired by the layout of the room where he works and how when dawn is breaking, the temperature slowly starts to rise, and a school near his home starts to bustle. Since "Sayonara Memories" was initially released in February 2010, Ryo used that month as the song's theme. He attempted to write a song that reflected February as the time of year in Japan when people are reminded of farewells they made the previous year, as well as the time when people think about meeting others for the first time. The last song "Watashi e" is meant to convey perseverance through tough times.

While Ryo writes all the music, an assortment of session musicians perform the songs on the album, including four guitarists and bassists, five drummers, three pianists, and a violinist. Ryo cites drummer Masayuki Muraishi as an influence in the composition of "Rock 'n' Roll Nan desu no"; Muraishi contributes on several songs on the album. In composing "Feel So Good", Ryo employed bassist Kenji Hino, son of Terumasa Hino, after he became interested in a performance of his on a TV music program. Ryo felt using strings in "Hoshi ga Matataku Konna Yoru ni" was an essential part of the song; Crusher Kimura provides the strings for three songs on the album. Haruko Ohinata is credited for the chorus of the song "Utakata Hanabi". Today Is A Beautiful Day was mixed by Takeshi Hara, Yasuhisa Kataoka, Keiji Kondo, Masashi Kudo, Eiji Makino, Koji Morimoto, Okuda Supa, and Shuji Yamaguchi. Yuji Chinone provided the mastering.

=== Artwork ===
The limited edition of Today Is A Beautiful Day came bundled with a 36-page full-color illustration booklet titled Supercell Works 2: 2009 Summer–2011 Spring. The booklet contains color illustrations for the songs, as well as comments by Ryo, Nagi Yanagi and the illustrators, an interview of Supercell members, and other details about the songs and artwork, including lyrics. The albums' packaging, designed by Yoshiki Usa, includes the song lyrics and some of the illustrations featured in Supercell Works 2. Each song is given an illustration by an artist, which include members outside of the band in addition to members of Supercell. These illustrators are listed below with the track listing. The cover art is by Shirow Miwa and shows a girl in a blue dress smiling in front of an assortment of flowers on a tan background. The limited edition came with a design case illustrated by Redjuice featuring a girl with luggage in tow in a rural setting walking next to an old-fashioned blue car.

== Release and reception ==
Today Is A Beautiful Day was released on March 16, 2011 in two editions: a regular CD version and a CD+DVD limited edition. The DVD contained an anime music video of the song "Perfect Day". Also on the DVD are trailers for the anime film Cencoroll, the visual novel Mahōtsukai no Yoru, and Shueisha's manga magazine Aoharu, as well as a commercial for "Kimi no Shiranai Monogatari" and the anime Bakemonogatari. For the week of March 14, 2011 on Oricon's weekly albums chart, Today Is A Beautiful Day was reported to have sold over 34,000 copies in its first week of sales, peaking at No. 3, and charted for 42 weeks. In July 2011, Today Is A Beautiful Day was awarded a Gold Disc by the Recording Industry Association of Japan for having exceeded 100,000 copies shipped in a single year.

== Music video ==
The DVD bundled with the album's limited edition included an anime music video of the song "Perfect Day" produced by Madhouse. It was directed by Ryōsuke Nakamura, with animation direction by Mieko Hosoi. The character design is based on original designs by Shirow Miwa. The video shows a girl with short, blue hair coming back to the town where she used to live. The girl reminisces about the time she spent with another girl with long, light brown hair years before when they were children. The two had fun around town, and during one day the wind blew the hat off the girl with brown hair. While walking around town, the two girls meet by chance, shocking both of them, but both are happy to each other again. The hat from years before lands in front of the blue-haired girl, much to her surprise, and she puts it on. Contrails are mentioned twice in the song as a part of the chorus and images of them are seen throughout the video. Nakamura says the video is about life and dreams, and he used the song as inspiration to make the video as a side story to the song's lyrics. He explains that the two girls are actually one person that chose different paths in life, and describes their chance meeting as a "somewhat magical winter day."

== Track listing ==
All tracks are written by Ryo.

No.	Title	Illustrator	Length
1.	"Owari e Mukau Hajimari no Uta" (終わりへ向かう始まりの歌 The First Song That Heads Toward the End)	Redjuice	2:09
2.	"Kimi no Shiranai Monogatari" (君の知らない物語 The Story You Don't Know)	Shirow Miwa	5:39
3.	"Hero" (ヒーロー Hīrō)	Shirow Miwa	5:08
4.	"Perfect Day"	Shirow Miwa	4:46
5.	"Fukushū" (復讐 Revenge)	Yusuke Kozaki	3:23
6.	"Rock 'n' Roll Nan desu no" (ロックンロールなんですの Because It's Rock 'N' Roll)	Yu	3:34
7.	"Love & Roll"	Atsuya Uki	4:53
8.	"Feel So Good"	Yukihiro Kofuyu	5:00
9.	"Hoshi ga Matataku Konna Yoru ni" (星が瞬くこんな夜に The Stars Twinkle on a Night Like This)	Hirokazu Koyama	4:26
10.	"Utakata Hanabi" (うたかた花火 Bubble Fireworks)	Huke	6:00
11.	"Yoru ga Akeru yo" (夜が明けるよ Dawn Will Break)	Nagimiso	4:50
12.	"Sayonara Memories" (さよならメモリーズ Goodbye Memories)	Redjuice	6:05
13.	"Watashi e" (私へ To Me)	Shirow Miwa	2:06
Total length:			58:20

== Personnel ==
Supercell

- Ryo – writer
- Shirow Miwa – cover illustration, illustrations
- Redjuice – cover illustration, illustrations
- Huke – illustrations
- Yoshiki Usa – art direction, design

Additional musicians

- Nagi Yanagi – vocals, chorus
- Haruko Ohinata – chorus
- Masato Ishinari – guitar, acoustic guitar
- Yukio Nagoshi – guitar
- Susumu Nishikawa – guitar
- Okiya Okoshi – guitar
- Kenji "Jino" Hino – bass
- Chiharu Mikuzuki – bass
- Yuichi Takama – bass
- Hirō Yamaguchi – bass
- Noriyasu "Kaasuke" Kawamura – drums
- Masayuki Muraishi – drums, tambourine
- Masuke Nozaki – drums
- Jay Stixx – drums
- Tom Tamada – drums
- Makoto Minagawa – piano
- Yasuharu Nakanishi – piano, Wurlitzer electric piano, electronic organ
- Shunsuke Watanabe – piano
- Crusher Kimura Strings – strings

Production

- Shunsuke Muramatsu – executive producer
- Takayuki Ishiyama – director
- Eiichi Maruyama – director
- Takeshi Hara – mixer
- Yasuhisa Kataoka – mixer
- Keiji Kondo – mixer
- Masashi Kudo – mixer
- Eiji "Q" Makino – mixer
- Koji Morimoto – mixer
- Okuda Supa – mixer
- Shuji Yamaguchi – mixer
- Yuji Chinone – mastering
- Keiko Koishi – products coordination
- Kumiko Torigoe – products coordination
- Kosachi Hata – artist management
