= Sayonara Memories =

Single by Supercell

from the album Today Is A Beautiful Day
- Released: February 10, 2010
- Genre: J-pop
- Length: 6:05
- Label: Sony Music
- Songwriter: Ryo
- Producer: Ryo

Supercell singles chronology
"Kimi no Shiranai Monogatari" (2009)	"Sayonara Memories" (2010)	"Kotchi Muite Baby/Yellow" (2010)

"Sayonara Memories" (さよならメモリーズ, Sayonara Memorīzu; lit. "Goodbye Memories") is a J-pop song by the Japanese band Supercell, written by Ryo. Supercell released it as their second single in February 2010 by Sony Music. A music video was produced for "Sayonara Memories", directed by Takahiro Miki and Taiki Ueda. Lyrically, the song deals with an unrequited love. The single peaked at No. 7 on Japan's weekly Oricon singles chart.

== Background ==
From August 2009 when Supercell released their debut single "Kimi no Shiranai Monogatari", it took Ryo about a month to compose a demo of "Sayonara Memories". Continuing from "Kimi no Shiranai Monogatari", Supercell again employed the vocalist Nagi Yanagi to sing "Sayonara Memories", though officially Yanagi is not a member of Supercell. After becoming a fan of the music composed by Ryo of Supercell, Yanagi contacted him and the two talked about someday collaborating. After being offered to be the singer for "Kimi no Shiranai Monogatari", it was decided that Yanagi would be the singer for Supercell's second album Today Is A Beautiful Day (2011). Previously, Ryo had used the Vocaloid singing synthesizer Hatsune Miku as the vocalist of Supercell's debut album Supercell (2009). In switching to a human singer, Ryo said "that although he loses absolute control over the tone of each and every phrase, working with a singer adds a human element that resonates better with listeners."

== Composition ==
"Sayonara Memories" is a J-pop song with instrumentation from electric and bass guitars, drums, piano and violin. According to a book of sheet music published by Yamaha Corporation, it is set in common time, and moves at a quick tempo of 160 beats per minute in the B major key throughout the song. The introduction starts with only piano accompanying Yanagi's vocals, and uses a bridge with added guitar, drums and violin to transition into the first verse. The song continues with the second and third verses, which also serves as the chorus melody, before employing another bridge. The musical structure used in the first three verses is repeated for the next three with different lyrics. After a short seventh verse, a break is employed, followed by the eighth verse. After a short instrumental outro, the song ends with Yanagi singing "Aa, yatto ieta" (ああ やっと言えた; "Ah I finally said it"), referring to a love confession at the end of the eighth verse.

"Sayonara Memories"
A 32-second sample from "Sayonara Memories", featuring Nagi Yanagi singing the third verse, which includes the title of the song.

Since "Sayonara Memories" was released in February, Ryo used February as the song's theme for the lyrics. Ryo commented that "in Japan, this is the graduation season, so I tried to express those farewells, the anxiety for the future, as well as hope for the future." Ryo described February as the time of year when people are reminded of farewells they made the previous year, as well as the time when people think about meeting others for the first time. He attempted to write a song with that sentiment. Ryo especially likes this time of year. The lyrics tell the story of a girl with an unrequited love who was never able to convey her feelings to the person she loved.

The cover artwork features an illustration by Redjuice, and Yanagi is credited as helping on part of the butterfly. The art direction and designs were handled by Yoshiki Usa. Redjuice and Usa received a rough mix of the song near the end of October 2009 and they began work on the artwork from there. Redjuice got much inspiration from the introduction of the song, which sounded similar to a school song to him. Despite "school" not appearing in the lyrics, Redjuice got a strong "school" impression from the song. Ryo likened Redjuice's illustrations to a shōjo manga style and Usa felt they had a nostalgic and retro feeling to them.

== Release and reception ==
"Sayonara Memories" was released in limited and regular editions on February 10, 2010 as a CD by Sony Music in Japan. The limited edition came bundled with a DVD containing the music video and TV commercial advertisement for "Sayonara Memories". The song peaked at No. 7 on Japan's weekly Oricon singles chart, selling about 20,000 copies in its first week of sales; it charted 16 weeks. "Sayonara Memories" debuted and peaked on the Billboard Japan Hot 100 at No. 31.

== Music video ==
The music video, directed by Takahiro Miki and Taiki Ueda, features a singer and four band members, who are not the studio band that plays the song. The band members in the video include: Yoshiya Hizawa on guitar, Tatsuhiro Endo on bass, Yu Watanabe on drums, and Jun Imai on piano. The video follows actress Ema Sakura who plays a girl who was not able to hand over a love letter to a boy she liked in her class, played by Hiroki Ino, before they graduated high school. At the beginning of the video, Sakura is awakened to find an astral projection of her past self (when she was still in high school) taking her love letter. Sakura runs through the city chasing after her projection and eventually comes to her high school where she is led to her classroom. Upon entering, she finds herself back in time with the letter in hand and only herself and Ino in the classroom. She hands over the letter and he thanks her for it, which brings her back to the present. She exits the school satisfied that she was finally able to convey her feelings. Throughout the song, the video shifts back and forth between shots the band members and Sakura. Ryo and Yoshiki Usa were actively involved in the creation of the music video, including during the audition process for who would play the girl in the video.

== Track listing ==
All tracks are written by Ryo.

No.	Title	Length
1.	"Sayonara Memories" (さよならメモリーズ Goodbye Memories)	6:05
2.	"Oshiete Ageru" (教えてあげる I'll Tell You)	4:38
3.	"Yakusoku o Shiyō" (約束をしよう Let's Make A Promise)	3:27
4.	"Sayonara Memories (Instrumental)" (さよならメモリーズ)	6:05
5.	"Oshiete Ageru (Instrumental)" (教えてあげる)	4:38

== Personnel ==
Supercell

- Ryo – writer
- Yoshiki Usa – art direction, design
- Redjuice – illustrations

Additional musicians

- Nagi Yanagi – vocals
- Susumu Nishikawa – guitar
- Masato Ishinari – guitar
- Yuichi Takama – bass
- Shinsuke Nozaki – drums, shaker
- Shunsuke Watanabe – piano
- Crusher Kimura – violin

Production

- Shunsuke Muramatsu – executive producer
- Yu Tamura – executive producer
- Keiji Kondo – mixer
- Yuji Chinone – mastering
- Masami Hatta – products coordination
- Eiichi Maruyama – director
- Taishi Fukuyama – vocal direction
- Madoka Yanagi – A&R

== Charts ==
Chart (2010)	Peak position
Japan Billboard Japan Hot 100	31
Japan Oricon Weekly Singles	7
