= David Production =

Japanese animation studio

David Production, Inc.
- Native name: 株式会社デイヴィッドプロダクション
- Romanized name: Kabushiki-gaisha Deividdo Purodakushon
- Type: Kabushiki gaisha
- Industry: Japanese animation
- Founded: September 2007
- Founder: Kōji Kajita; Taito Okiura
- Headquarters: Nishitōkyō, Tokyo, Japan
- Key people: Shūichirō Tanaka (CEO)
- Number of employees: 105 (as of June 2026)
- Parent: Fuji Television
- Website: davidproduction.jp

David Production, Inc. (Japanese: 株式会社デイヴィッドプロダクション, Hepburn: Kabushiki-gaisha Deividdo Purodakushon) is a Japanese animation studio founded in September 2007 by former Gonzo producers Kōji Kajita and Taito Okiura, and is based in Nishitōkyō, Tokyo. Notable works from the studio include JoJo's Bizarre Adventure, Cells at Work!, the 2018 adaptation of Captain Tsubasa, Fire Force, and the 2022 adaptation of Urusei Yatsura.

== Establishment ==
The company was founded by former Gonzo president and producer Kōji Kajita and fellow producer Taito Okiura in September 2007 upon having left Gonzo. The company's first work was as an animation subcontractor, but in 2009 David Production undertook their first full animation production as a primary contractor with Ristorante Paradiso.

Fuji Television acquired the studio on August 1, 2014.

The company's name is a reference to the Biblical story of David and Goliath, a story chosen to represent "[the creation of] good animation with great storytelling and characters" despite being smaller than other well-known studios. It is also short for "Design Audio & Visual Illusion Dynamics", which signifies the studio's impactful animations.

== Productions ==
=== Anime television series ===
| Year | Title | Director(s) | Eps. | Note(s) |
|---|---|---|---|---|
| 2009 | Ristorante Paradiso | Mitsuko Kase | 11 | Adaptation of the manga series by Natsume Ono. |
| 2009–2010 | Tatakau Shisho: The Book of Bantorra | Toshiya Shinohara | 27 | Adaptation of the light novel series by Ishio Yamagata. |
| 2011 | Level E | Toshiyuki Kato | 13 | Adaptation of the manga series by Yoshihiro Togashi. Co-production with Pierrot. |
| 2011 | Ben-To | Shin Itagaki | 12 | Adaptation of the light novel series by Asaura. |
| 2012 | Inu × Boku SS | Naokatsu Tsuda | 12 +OVA | Adaptation of the manga series by Cocoa Fujiwara. |
| 2012–2013 | JoJo's Bizarre Adventure | Naokatsu Tsuda; Kenichi Suzuki (Note: Credited as Series Director (シリーズディレクター, Shirīzu Direkutā).) | 26 | Adaptation of the first two parts of the manga series by Hirohiko Araki. |
| 2013 | Hyperdimension Neptunia: The Animation | Masahiro Mukai | 12 +OVA | Based on a video game series by Idea Factory and Compile Heart. |
| 2014–2015 | JoJo's Bizarre Adventure: Stardust Crusaders | Naokatsu Tsuda; Kenichi Suzuki | 48 | Adaptation of the third part of the manga series by Hirohiko Araki. |
| 2016 | JoJo's Bizarre Adventure: Diamond Is Unbreakable | Naokatsu Tsuda; Toshiyuki Kato | 39 | Adaptation of the fourth part of the manga series by Hirohiko Araki. |
| 2016–2018 | Monster Hunter Stories: Ride On | Mitsuru Hongo | 75 | Based on a video game series by Capcom. |
| 2017 | Sagrada Reset | Shinya Kawatsura | 24 | Adaptation of the light novel series by Yutaka Kōno. |
| 2018–2019 | Captain Tsubasa | Toshiyuki Kato; Hirofumi Ogura | 52 | Adaptation of the manga series by Yōichi Takahashi. |
| 2018 | Cells at Work! | Kenichi Suzuki | 13 | Adaptation of the manga series by Akane Shimizu. |
| 2018–2019 | JoJo's Bizarre Adventure: Golden Wind | Naokatsu Tsuda (Note: Credited as Chief Director (総監督, Sō Kantoku).); Yasuhiro Kimura; Hideya Takahashi | 39 | Adaptation of the fifth part of the manga series by Hirohiko Araki. |
| 2019–2026 | Fire Force | Yuki Yase (season 1); Tatsuma Minamikawa (season 2-3) | 73 | Adaptation of the manga series by Atsushi Ōkubo. |
| 2019 | Ensemble Stars! | Mazakazu Hishida; Yasufumi Soejima | 24 | Based on a smartphone game by Happy Elements. |
| 2020 | Strike Witches: Road to Berlin | Kazuhiro Takamura; Hideya Takahashi | 12 | Third season of Strike Witches. |
| 2021 | 2.43: Seiin High School Boys Volleyball Team | Yasuhiro Kimura | 12 | Adaptation of the light novel series by Yukako Kabei. |
| 2021 | Cells at Work!! | Hirofumi Ogura | 8 | Second season of Cells at Work!. |
| 2021–2022 | JoJo's Bizarre Adventure: Stone Ocean | Kenichi Suzuki Toshiyuki Kato | 38 | Adaptation of the sixth part of the manga series by Hirohiko Araki. |
| 2022–2024 | Urusei Yatsura | Yasuhiro Kimura; Hideya Takahashi; Takahiro Kamei | 46 | Second adaptation of the manga series by Rumiko Takahashi; with the first being in 1981. |
| 2023–2024 | Undead Unluck | Yuki Yase | 24 | Adaptation of the manga series by Yoshifumi Tozuka. Co-produced with TMS Entertainment. |
| 2025 | Onmyo Kaiten Re:Birth Verse | Hideya Takahashi | 12 | Original work. |
| 2026 | Firefly Wedding | Takahiro Kamei | 12 | Adaptation of the manga series by Oreco Tachibana. |

=== Anime films ===
| Year | Title | Director(s) | Dur. | Note(s) |
|---|---|---|---|---|
| 2016 | Planetarian: Storyteller of the Stars | Naokatsu Tsuda | 117m | Based on a visual novel by Key. |
| 2020 | "Hataraku Saibō!!" Saikyō no Teki, Futatabi. Karada no Naka wa "Chō" Ōsawagi! | Hirofumi Ogura | 112m | Adaptation of the manga series by Akane Shimizu. |
| 2021 | The House of the Lost on the Cape | Shin'ya Kawatsura | 100m | Adaptation of the novel by Sachiko Kashiwaba. |
| 2022 | Ensemble Stars!! Road to Show!! | Asami Nakatani; Masakazu Hishida | 72m | Based on a smartphone game by Happy Elements. |

=== Original video animations (OVAs) ===
| Year | Title | Director(s) | Eps. | Note(s) |
|---|---|---|---|---|
| 2009 | Dogs: Stray Dogs Howling in the Dark | Tatsuya Abe | 4 | Adaptation of the manga series by Shirow Miwa. |
| 2012 | Lost Forest | Yasufumi Soejima | 1 | Music video by MOKA. |
| 2017–2019 | Thus Spoke Kishibe Rohan | Toshiyuki Kato; Yasufumi Soejima | 4 | Adaptation of the one-shot manga by Hirohiko Araki. |

=== Original net animations (ONAs) ===
| Year | Title | Director(s) | Eps. | Note(s) |
|---|---|---|---|---|
| 2016 | Planetarian: The Reverie of a Little Planet | Naokatsu Tsuda | 5 | Based on a visual novel by Key. |
| 2021–2022 | JoJo's Bizarre Adventure: Stone Ocean | Kenichi Suzuki; Toshiyuki Kato | 38 | Netflix; adaptation of the sixth part of the manga series by Hirohiko Araki. |
| 2022 | Spriggan | Hiroshi Kobayashi | 6 | Netflix; adaptation of the manga series by Hiroshi Takashige and Ryōji Minagawa. |
| 2025 | Star Wars: Visions | Shinya Ohira | Volume 3, episode 9 | |
| 2026 | Steel Ball Run: JoJo's Bizarre Adventure | Yasuhiro Kimura; Hideya Takahashi; Toshiyuki Kato | TBA | Netflix; adaptation of the seventh part of the manga series by Hirohiko Araki. |

== See also ==
- Okuruto Noboru – An animation studio founded in 2017 by line producer Wani Koguchi and other former production staff members
- Shaft – Producers Reo Honjouya and Kousuke Matsunaga, as well as CG director Shinya Takano, were part of Shaft prior to their joining of David Production around 2018
