= Dogs (manga) =

Japanese manga series

- Dogs: Bullets & Carnage
- First tankōbon volume cover
- Genre: Action, mystery
- Manga

Dogs: Stray Dogs Howling in the Dark
- Written by: Shirow Miwa
- Published by: Shueisha
- English publisher: NA: Viz Media
- Magazine: Ultra Jump
- Original run: 2000 – 2001
- Volumes: 1
- Manga
- Written by: Shirow Miwa
- Published by: Shueisha
- English publisher: AUS: Madman Entertainment; NA: Viz Media
- Magazine: Ultra Jump
- Original run: June 18, 2005 – present
- Volumes: 10
- Original video animation

Dogs: Stray Dogs Howling in the Dark
- Directed by: Tatsuya Abe
- Produced by: Tetsuro Saito; Takashi Takano
- Written by: Kiyoko Yoshimura
- Music by: Kennosuke Suemura
- Studio: David Production
- Released: May 19, 2009 – May 29, 2009
- Runtime: 16 minutes
- Episodes: 4
- icon

Dogs: Bullets & Carnage (stylized as DOGS / BULLETS & CARNAGE) is a Japanese manga series, written and illustrated by Shirow Miwa. A first one-shot series Dogs: Prelude (originally titled Dogs: Stray Dogs Howling in the Dark), was published in Shueisha's seinen manga magazine Ultra Jump from 2000 to 2001. Dogs: Bullets & Carnage started in the same magazine in June 2005. The manga was licensed for English release in North America by Viz Media. Dogs: Prelude was adapted into a two-volume original video animation (OVA) by David Production in 2009.

== Premise ==
Dogs is set in a dystopic European city where violence, crime, genetic manipulation and other scientific brutalities have become common. The story focuses on four antihero protagonists who, through a series of coincidences, meet as they search for a way down to "the Below", looking for answers to their individual pasts.

== Media ==
=== Manga ===
Written and illustrated by Shirow Miwa, the first series, Dogs (狗-DOGS-, Ku Doggusu), was published in Shueisha's seinen manga magazine Ultra Jump from 2000 to 2001. Its chapters were collected in a single tankōbon volume, titled Dogs: Stray Dogs Howling in the Dark (グッドドッグ・ステイ, Guddo Doggu: Sutei; lit. 'Good Dog: Stay'). The sequel, Dogs: Bullets & Carnage started in Ultra Jump on June 18, 2005. Its latest chapter was released on March 19, 2015, and the manga has been on hiatus since. Miwa stated in February 2017, that he was planning to resume the series. Shueisha thas collected its chapters into individual tankōbon volumes. The first volume was released on October 19, 2006. As of August 20, 2014, ten volumes have been released.

In July 2008, Viz Media announced that it had licensed the series. Releases began in April 2009.

=== Drama CD ===
The original Dogs: Stray Dogs Howling into the Dark volume was adapted into a drama CD released in 2007. A second drama CD was released on October 23, 2010, adapting the first volume of Dogs: Bullets & Carnage.

=== Anime ===
On November 19, 2008, an OVA adaptation of Dogs: Stray Dogs Howling in the Dark was announced in Ultra Jump. The two-volume OVA series was produced by David Production and featured the same voice cast as the drama CD. The first DVD volume, released on May 19, 2009, with the fourth volume of Dogs: Bullets & Carnage, featured adaptations of the first two chapters, "Weepy Old Killer" and "Gun Smoker". The second DVD volume, featuring "Blade Maiden" and "Stray Dogs Howling in the Dark", was initially released on May 29, 2009, for a limited time and later released on July 17, 2009, along with a limited edition reissue of the first Dogs manga which included new story material.

== Reception ==
Carlo Santos of Anime News Network stated that Shirow Miwa raised "gunplay to the level of art" and that the loosely connected characters "provide the backdrop for mouth-watering eye candy". He also stated that the "bent-perspective and striking layouts" will dazzle the reader "with split-second bullet-time acrobats". The most striking aspect is how the sparse backgrounds and lack of special effects make each scene more effective because the critical moments have a "frozen in time" quality more effective than a comic book's attempt to capture motion in a still frame. Santos also credits Miwa's ability to "craft a manga storyline about an old man who's the very opposite of a spunky teenage protagonist". However, Santos commented that it is another "pompous, preening '_____ with guns' series" and that it is hard to find any substance of artistry when the Miwa is "cycling through all the usual tough-guy tropes". The characters fall into clichés and the entire series is "cliché city". He stated that the stories are too loosely connected. Even though the characters encounter each other eventually, it is "not the same thing as actually kicking off a storyline together".

Leroy Douresseaux of Comic Book Bin stated the volume is "a stylishly violent crime thriller in the vein of Asian film-influenced movies like Pulp Fiction and The Matrix" and that Miwa's art reflects the elegance such a manga needs. He thought that the characters dress well and that most of characters "sport top-of-the-line hair styles". The series is not empty either. Douresseaux called the series "visually sharp" and said that it bears some weight behind each swing. He commented that Garth Ennis fans and fans of violent anime will like the series.

Manga Recon's Ken Haley stated that although all four stories in the volume were enjoyable and entertaining, the fourth story involving Heine "feels cut off and adrift from the other three" because it incorporated science fiction elements the other three did not hint at. He felt that Miwa's artwork is engaging and the characters designs are interesting and "contemporary with a vague hint of industrial/goth at times". Miwa's use of heavy blacks and stark whites reminded Haley of Shou Tajima, illustrator of Multiple Personality Detective Psycho, although there is no further similarity. He said that Miwa's style is dynamic and the action sequences are "fast-paced and kinetic" because of liberal use of extreme depth cues, an artistic technique which exaggerates the sense of distance. However, the technique does seem a bit overused as it is used in every action sequence, causing it to lose impact. Haley commented that Miwa used the technique in a satirical manner and, if so, "it worked". He praised the lack of backgrounds as they give the stories a "universal feeling" and allows them to be set in any modern-day city. However, the lack of backgrounds means that important setting information needs to be expressed through dialogue. Despite this, Haley is curious to see what will happen next and how the plots will connect to one another.
