= Melt (Supercell song) =

Single by Ryo feat. Hatsune Miku

from the album Supercell
- Language: Japanese
- B-side: "Kimi o Wasurenai"
- Released: December 31, 2007
- Genre: J-pop; Vocaloid
- Length: 4:16
- Songwriter: Ryo

Supercell singles chronology
"Melt" (2007)	"Kimi no Shiranai Monogatari" (2009)

"Melt" (メルト, Meruto) is a song by Japanese band Supercell, particularly its frontman Ryo, featuring vocals from Vocaloid voice synthesizer Hatsune Miku. It was released on Niconico on December 7, 2007, and as a single on CD on December 31 at Comiket 73, and later rerecorded and included as an additional track for the Sony Music rerelease of the unit's debut self-titled album Supercell. The song is widely considered to be one of the Vocaloid scene's earliest hits, and a classic of the community.

It has been remixed and covered numerous times, including as a special track for the 2026 film Cosmic Princess Kaguya!, and helped to establish the utaite subculture of Niconico. The song has also been performed at several Vocaloid concerts and makes appearances in games such as Hatsune Miku: Project Diva.

== Composition ==
"Melt" was composed and produced by Ryo after obtaining Hatsune Miku while working as a temporary dispatch worker at an electronics company. After discovering Vocaloid, he decided to change his career path, applying to a sound design job that required ten sound effect tracks and three original musical compositions. "Melt" was his first ever Vocaloid song. The song's backing track features a piano, played at an upbeat, fast tempo that utilizes complex sixteenth note drum rhythms.

Ryo - メルト
The chorus of "Melt", featuring piano and complex drum rhythms to back up Miku's high-pitched vocals.

The lyrics portray Miku as a regular teenage girl, focusing on cuteness, depicting her as a shy girl who cuts her bangs in the hopes of being noticed by her crush. She is deeply in love, but unable to confess her feelings. Academic writer Keisuke Yamada notes in his book Supercell's Supercell Featuring Hatsune Miku that fans have thoroughly analyzed the song's lyrics, which include anecdotes about Miku and her crush getting caught in the rain and having to share her small umbrella, which in Japan has romantic connotations. Fans have speculated on the connection between the girl narrating the song and the pop idol persona of Hatsune Miku – whether they are the same, or if Miku is simply singing a song about another person.

== Release ==
"Melt" was first released online on the video sharing site Niconico on December 7, 2007, just four months after the release of Hatsune Miku, and surpassed 3.3 million views in its first year. The CD single was released later that month on December 31, 2007, at Comiket 73.

According to Ryo, the cover illustration by artist 119 was originally used without permission after Ryo found the artwork on a wallpaper site, but also that 119 "really liked" the song. 119 granted Ryo permission to use the image, and even suggested he release a CD. Supercell was formed accidentally as a result of this interaction, as they began collaborating together frequently and 119 invited other illustrators to work alongside them.

The song would also appear on Supercell's debut album, Supercell, upon its Sony Music rerelease on March 4, 2009. The track, alongside the others, was rerecorded for the album with bassist Tissue Hime and guitarist Ōkoshi Okiya. The album's rerelease also came bundled with a bonus DVD that included 4 music videos, one of which was for "Melt".

== Track listing ==
No.	Title	Length
1.	"Melt" (メルト)	4:16
2.	"Melt (Karaoke ver.)" (メルト)	4:16
3.	"Kimi o Wasurenai" (きみをわすれない)	5:25
4.	"Kimi o Wasurenai (Arrange ver.)" (きみをわすれない)	5:45
Total length:		19:42

== Reception and legacy ==
"Melt" is widely considered to be a classic Vocaloid song, one of the scene's first big hits, and one of the representative songs of early Niconico. Within its first year, it amassed over three million views on Niconico. The song was the number one most viewed video on Niconico in 2007. Upon first hearing "Melt", Sony Music executive producer Kazumitsu Shimizu said that the song gave him goosebumps, and that "the lyrics were truly wonderful".

"Melt" has been remixed, covered, and rearranged by numerous other artists. The song reached 11 million views on November 23, 2016. For its 10th anniversary, the song was covered in an enka style by singer Sachiko Kobayashi. In 2025, the song was covered for the anime series Puniru Is a Cute Slime, complete with a music video for the cover version. The song was also remixed as a special track for the 2026 film Cosmic Princess Kaguya!. The remixed version, "Melt (CPK! Remix)", debuted at number one on Billboard Japan's Niconico Vocaloid Songs Top 20 chart. The song has been performed at several live events, including Hatsune Miku Symphony. The song also features in rhythm game series such as Hatsune Miku: Project Diva and Taiko no Tatsujin.

"Melt" directly contributed to the formation of the utaite subculture, built around amateur online cover singers. Searching for "Melt utaittemita" on YouTube produced approximately 68 thousand results in August 2016, with many of these videos having over ten thousand views each. Despite this, blogger Sunagi Izumo noted that its melodic range would be difficult for an amateur to sing, as it spans two whole octaves from A3 to A5, but this did not stop them from singing the song anyways. The 2009 rankings for karaoke service Joysound placed "Melt" in the number one spot of their newly created Vocaloid song chart. Even outside of the specific Vocaloid chart, it also ranked ninth in the overall annual rankings for 2009, and seventh in 2010.
