= Witch on the Holy Night =

Japanese visual novel

- Cover art of the original release, featuring Soujyuro Sizuki (left), Aoko Aozaki (center) and Alice Kuonji (right)
- Developer: Type-Moon
- Publishers: Type-Moon (Windows); Aniplex (NS, PS4, Steam, iOS, Android)
- Director: Monoji Tsukuri
- Artist: Hirokazu Koyama
- Writer: Kinoko Nasu
- Composer: Hideyuki Fukasawa
- Platforms: Windows; Nintendo Switch; PlayStation 4; iOS; Android
- Release: Windows: JP: April 12, 2012; WW: December 14, 2023; Nintendo Switch, PS4: WW: December 8, 2022; iOS, Android: WW: November 20, 2026
- Genre: Visual novel
- Mode: Single-player

Witch on the Holy Night (Japanese: 魔法使いの夜) is a Japanese visual novel developed and published by Type-Moon. It was first released for Windows on April 12, 2012, in Japan. An enhanced remastered version with voice acting and updated graphics was released by Aniplex worldwide for Nintendo Switch and PlayStation 4 on December 8, 2022, for Windows via Steam on December 14, 2023, and for iOS and Android on November 20, 2026 alongside an anime film adaptation by Ufotable. The game is often regarded as a kinetic novel: the user experiences a linear plotline with little variation and few player choices. The game is a prequel to Tsukihime and explores the backstory of Shiki Tohno's master Aoko Aozaki.

== Plot ==
Near the end of the Shōwa era, in Misaki town, an old mansion is rumored to be the home of a witch. After moving there, Aoko Aozaki begins to learn sorcery from a young mage, Alice Kuonji, the rumored witch of the mansion. The Aozaki family oversees the land on which Misaki is built, and the heir (Aoko) is tasked with protecting it. Mysterious intruders have been disrupting the bounded field in Misaki, leading Alice and Aoko to investigate. A mannequin or puppet attacks them and is incinerated. As this happens, both of them spot someone running away, a civilian who must not get away, having seen magic alive. Unexpectedly, a young boy named Sōjūrō Shizuki is drawn to the mansion and comes to reside with them as well. Eventually, it is revealed that the intruder who had been disrupting the bounded field is Touko Aozaki, Aoko's older sister. She, having killed their grandfather, now seeks to unveil the Aozaki's path to the root.

The game takes place in the shared "Nasuverse" a colloquial term referring to a shared universe within the works created by Type-Moon, and takes place many years before the events of the original 2000 release of Tsukihime. The remakes of Tsukihime, titled Tsukihime: A Piece of Blue Glass Moon and Tsukihime: The Other Side of Red Garden, take place within the same universe as Witch on the Holy Night.

== Characters ==
=== Main characters ===
Aoko Aozaki (蒼崎青子, Aozaki Aoko)
Voiced by: Haruka Tomatsu
The first protagonist of the story and a high school student who has just begun to learn sorcery after moving into an old mansion where a witch was rumored to live. At school, she is the student council president. Aoko first appeared as a minor character in Tsukihime and its sequels Kagetsu Tohya and Melty Blood, and has appeared in several other non-Tsukihime-related Type-Moon games and media such as Fate/Extra.

Alice Kuonji (久遠寺有珠, Kuonji Arisu)
Voiced by: Kana Hanazawa
A natural-born witch, the daughter of the elder son of the wealthy Kuonji family and a witch he fell in love with, who lives alone in a mansion. She is emotionally detached and self-abusive; thus, she does not form relationships easily but gradually comes to accept Aoko as a friend. She has been acquainted with the Aozaki family for over ten years and serves as Aoko's partner and teacher.

Sōjūrō Shizuki (静希草十郎, Shizuki Sōjūrō; romanized as Soujyuro Sizuki in the English version)
Voiced by: Yūsuke Kobayashi
The second protagonist of the story and a young man from a rural location who is still adjusting to living in the city and is a normal high school student. He is quiet and reserved, but warm-hearted and stable in contrast to Aoko and Alice. He winds up living at the Kuonji mansion as well, despite Alice's attempts to drive him away by ignoring him, and Alice develops uncertain feelings toward him.

=== Supporting characters ===
Touko Aozaki (蒼崎橙子, Aozaki Tōko)
Voiced by: Ruriko Aoki
Aoko's older sister, regarded as a genius magus in the Aozaki family, believed that their magical lineage was dying out. She and Aoko never get along particularly well. Alice enjoys Touko's company because she is a person who can truly understand Alice, though Alice does little to stop Aoko and Touko from fighting. Touko previously appeared in The Garden of Sinners.
Lugh Beowulf (ルゥ ベオウルフ, Ruu Beoworufu)
Voiced by: Atsumi Tanezaki
The antagonist of the story, an ageless nature spirit whose true form is a golden werewolf, though he appears as a fair-haired young boy. His existence is similar to the True Ancestors that appeared in Tsukihime. Other werewolves once revered him as the werewolf who would revive their race, but he was ostracized and later sold to Touko Aozaki when it became apparent he was not a true werewolf. He is badly injured in mortal combat with Sōjūrō, who destroys his heart with two concentrated blows. As Lugh is immortal, he easily regenerates, but the horrific nature of the wound, the pain he suffered from the injury and subsequent regeneration, and Sōjurō's bizarre nature cause Lugh to become catatonic with fear and be emotionally reduced to the child he appears to be.
Tobimaru Tsukiji (槻司鳶丸, Tsukiji Tobimaru)
Voiced by: Toshinari Fukamachi
The popular vice-president of the Student Council, a classmate of Aoko who becomes Sojuro's best friend. He and Aoko were close friends as children, though they both deny having any feelings for one another. His family life is apparently complicated, and he is known to casually smoke and spend nights out. Tobimaru happens to have unrequited feelings for Kojika Kumari.
Kojika Kumari (久万梨金鹿, Kumari Kojika)
Voiced by: Chika Anzai
The treasurer of the Student Council, a friend and classmate of Aoko who possesses a cool-mannered and realistic personality. She is very responsible as a result of being in charge of a household of brothers, but she dislikes how the men in her life look down on her. Though her father disapproves of her desire to attend college, Kojika still works hard to save money to attend anyway.
Hōsuke Kinomi (木乃美芳助, Kinomi Hōsuke)
Voiced by: Shohei Kajikawa
A classmate of Sojuro, Hosuke is a cheerful young man whose primary interests are the attractive girls in class and becoming rich someday. He often tries to organize the male students in class, though his cunning often fails, and the girls wind up pitying him instead. He is also Sojuro's co-worker at their part-time job.
May Riddell Archelot (メイ・リデル・アーシェロット, Mei Rideru Āsherotto)
Voiced by: Natsumi Takamori
An idol singer who has travelled around the world, May is also a mage with an eccentric personality. She is acquainted with Sojuro by unknown means and is known by the church. As a mage, her ability is considerable enough to cause trouble for Lugh.
Ritsuka Suse (周瀬律架, Suse Ritsuka)
Voiced by: Shizuka Itō
A member of the Mage's Association, though she has only been part of the organization for a year after leaving the Church. It is believed that Ritsuka is apprenticed to the Aozaki family to act as a watchdog, which is why Aoko is suspicious of Ritsuka's intentions.
Yuika Suse (周瀬唯架, Suse Yuika)
Voiced by: Akiha Matsui
Ritsuka's twin sister, a member of the church, is well-known in town as a pious nun. She possesses a genetic condition that results in heightened senses and is skilled in rougher acts as well.
Eiri Fumizuka (文柄詠梨, Fumizuka Eiri)
Voiced by: Hiromichi Tezuka
A member of the Church. Despite his gentle personality, his advice is often critical and harsh. He was once apprenticed to the Aozaki family and happens to be Touko's old lover. Because he was strong enough to kill a witch, Touko remains vigilant around him.
Yurihiko Tokitsu (土桔由里彦, Tokitsu Yurihiko)
Voiced by: Nobuo Tobita
Owner of an antiques shop.
Kazuki Yamashiro (山城和樹, Yamashiro Kazuki)
Voiced by: Satoshi Hino
A teacher of Aoko and Sōjurō's class.

== Development and release ==
Kinoko Nasu was inspired in late 1995 by the first episode of Neon Genesis Evangelion to write a novel, something he had been thinking of doing since he was in high school. Nasu originally wrote Mahōtsukai no Yoru on the spur of the moment as a roughly 400-page novel in winter 1996. He tried to enter it into several writing competitions, but was ultimately unsuccessful, leaving the work merely being passed around by his friends. Later, Nasu planned to submit it to Fujimi Shobo, but had difficulty keeping the page count under 350 pages, and left the novel unreleased. After forming Type-Moon with Takashi Takeuchi and releasing several projects under it, Takeuchi suggested remaking Mahōtsukai no Yoru so it could be released before their next planned project Girls' Work.

In April 2008, a game version of Mahōtsukai no Yoru was announced. Unlike Type-Moon's previous games, Mahōtsukai no Yoru is not an adult game, and features Hirokazu Koyama as the lead artist in place of Takeuchi. The game was set to be released sometime in 2009, but after several delays, the game received a September 2010 release date. In September, however, Type-Moon announced that the release date had been pushed back to winter 2011, and later to sometime in 2011. A free game demo was made available on December 15, 2011, and the full game was released on April 12, 2012 for Windows PCs.

An enhanced version for Nintendo Switch and PlayStation 4 was announced in April 2022, and published by Aniplex on December 8, 2022 in Japan. A demo version was released on November 3, 2022. In June 2022, it was confirmed that the game would also launch worldwide under the title Witch on the Holy Night on the same date. It features a higher resolution than the original PC release and full voice acting along with English, Simplified Chinese and Traditional Chinese language options. A Windows port of this version was announced in September 2023, and was released via Steam on December 14, 2023. A smartphone version is to be released on November 20, 2026 in conjunction with the movie.

Two visual novel sequels are planned by Type-Moon, though no updates have been made since 2012.

== Reception ==
Reception

Aggregate score
Aggregator	Score
Metacritic	83/100 (PS4); 81/100 (NS)

Review scores
Publication	Score
Hardcore Gamer	3.5/5
Play	7/10
Anime News Network	B+
Siliconera	8/10

Upon release, Witch on the Holy Night received "generally favorable" reviews from video game publications based on the review aggregate website Metacritic aimed towards the Nintendo Switch port.

Jason Bohn of Hardcore Gamer had called Witch on the Holy Night a "fun, but flawed" game, and criticized the pacing, saying "there are periods that just drag on", but also felt that it "does earn its reading time". The reviewer had criticized the localization, noting that "there are errant keystrokes or obvious grammatical errors." While Donald Theriault writing for Nintendo World Report said the game was "a 12 chapter novel with high resolution graphics, full voice acting, and no discernible gameplay beyond changing how text is displayed" and called it "a well-written story that sets up a lot of things for the future" while noting that "most of the text is well translated; although a few typos were present [...] they weren't occurring frequently enough to be a concern." Anime News Network's Jean-Karlo Lemus felt that the game had lots to offer. The reviewer explained that "While Nasu's stiff, wordy narration might be a turn-off, the characters and their interactions more than redeem it, and the primary conflict is engrossing and moving." While Stephanie Liu at Siliconera said it "tells a fun and engaging story with tons of well-written and fleshed-out characters".

== Music ==
The game's three disc original soundtrack was released on May 9, 2012, composed by Hideyuki Fukasawa and Keita Haga. A two disc arrangement album featuring tracks from the game titled Witch on the Holy Night Original Soundtrack Repetition was released on December 29, 2013.

Witch on the Holy Night's ending theme song is "Hoshi ga Matataku Konna Yoru ni" (星が瞬くこんな夜に) by Supercell, and was released with the game's soundtrack.

== Media ==
- Witch on the Holy Night

魔法使いの夜 (Mahōtsukai no Yoru)
- Created by: Type-Moon; Aniplex
- Novel series
- Written by: Kinoko Nasu
- Illustrated by: Hirokazu Koyama
- Published by: Seikaisha
- Imprint: Seikaisha Fictions
- Original run: August 27, 2026 – November 10, 2026
- Volumes: 3
- Manga

Witch on the Holy Night: Witch Records
- Written by: Type-Moon
- Illustrated by: Nakatani
- Published by: Kadokawa Shoten
- Imprint: Kadokawa Comics A
- Published: November 10, 2026
- Volumes: 1
- Manga
- Written by: Type-Moon
- Illustrated by: Keigo Maki
- Published by: Kodansha
- English publisher: Kodansha
- Magazine: Weekly Shōnen Magazine
- Original run: November 11, 2026 – present
- Anime film
- Directed by: Hikaru Kondo (chief); Masashi Takeuchi
- Written by: Ufotable
- Music by: Hideyuki Fukasawa
- Studio: Ufotable
- Licensed by: Crunchyroll (Note: Through Sony Pictures Releasing.)
- Released: November 20, 2026
- Runtime: 130 minutes
- icon

=== Novels ===
In July 2026, it was announced that a three-volume novelization of Witch on the Holy Night would be released by Seikaisha from August 27 to November 10, 2026. The novels were written by Kinoko Nasu and illustrated by Hirokazu Koyama.

No.	Japanese release date	Japanese ISBN
1	August 27, 2026	978-4-06-544395-8
2	September 30, 2026	978-4-06-545012-3
3	November 10, 2026	978-4-06-545364-3

=== Manga ===
A manga collection illustrated by Nakatani, titled Witch on the Holy Night: Witch Records (魔法使いの夜 ウィッチレコーズ, Mahōtsukai no Yoru: Witchi Rekōzu), was released by Kadokawa Shoten under their Kadokawa Comics A imprint on November 10, 2026.

No.	Japanese release date	Japanese ISBN
1	November 10, 2026	978-4-04-117949-9

A manga adaptation illustrated by Keigo Maki began serialization in Kodansha's Weekly Shōnen Magazine on November 11, 2026. The series' chapters are published in English on Kodansha's K Manga app.

=== Anime film ===
In December 2021, it was announced that the game would be adapted into an anime film produced by Ufotable. It is directed by Masashi Takeuchi, with Hikaru Kondo serving as chief director, with Ufotable handling script production, Moe Tsuzuki designing the characters, Hideyuki Fukasawa composing the music. The cast from the visual novel are reprising their roles. The film was released in Japan on November 20, 2026. The film's theme song is "Yoru to Ao" (夜と青; 'Night and Blue'), performed by Supercell. Crunchyroll has licensed the film and will release it on January 29, 2027 in the United States and Canada, along with an English dub.
