= Nagi Yanagi =

Japanese singer-songwriter (born 1987)

- やなぎ なぎ
- Born: May 31, 1987 (age 39); Osaka Prefecture, Japan
- Occupations: Singer; songwriter
- Years active: 2006–present
- Agent: INCS toenter
- Musical career
- Genre: J-pop
- Instruments: Vocals; piano
- Labels: NBCUniversal Entertainment Japan (2012–present); Avex Pictures Inc. (2020); JVR Music (2025–present); Alfa Music (2005–2013)
- Website: yanaginagi.net

Nagi Yanagi (やなぎ なぎ, Yanagi Nagi; born May 31, 1987), stylized as yanaginagi (やなぎなぎ), is a Japanese singer and songwriter from Osaka Prefecture who is signed to NBCUniversal Entertainment Japan. After becoming interested with music in her childhood, she began singing and writing original songs. In 2006, she began uploading her music to Niconico and other websites, gaining the attention of the J-pop band Supercell, who featured Yanagi as the guest vocalist from 2009 to 2011.

Yanagi made her solo debut in February 2012 with the release of the single "Vidro Moyō", which is used as the ending theme to the anime Waiting in the Summer. Her music has been featured in anime series such as My Youth Romantic Comedy Is Wrong, As I Expected, Jormungand, Seraph of the End, and Nagi-Asu: A Lull in the Sea. She has also performed at overseas events in Southeast Asia, China, and Europe. In 2012, Yanagi collaborated with composer Jun Maeda of Key to produce the original concept album Owari no Hoshi no Love Song, which finished 6th on the Oricon charts, marking her first album to chart.

Yanagi has written the song for 2014's Kamigami no Asobi. Aside from singing and songwriting, Yanagi served as the music producer of the 2017 anime series Just Because!. She announced her marriage on her official blog on August 5, 2019.

== Early life ==
Yanagi was born in Osaka Prefecture on May 31, 1987. From an early age, she had become interested in music, playing with an electronic keyboard her neighbor originally intended to throw away. She also sang to nursery rhymes, making up tunes as she saw fit. When she was in junior high school, her brother bought computer programs used for producing music, which she decided to experiment on. During her junior high school years, because of her belief that "her voice was mediocre", she decided to make music instead.

== Career ==
=== 2006–2011: Early career and Supercell ===
Yanagi began posting cover versions of songs online in 2006, and started producing original dōjin music under the name CorLeonis. She released four studio albums individually: EN (2006), Leonis (2007), Freirinite (2008), and Oort no Yume (オールトの夢) (2010). Leonis was only released online via Yanagi's website. Two more releases followed in 2011: the single "Hyōka no Kuni" (氷下の国) and the best of album Ame no Umi (雨の海). In May 2006, she formed the music duo Binaria with female singer Annabel. Between 2007 and 2011, Binaria released two mini-albums (Alhaja (2007) and Forma (2007)), one best of album (Sonido (2010)), and four singles ("Epoca" (2008), "Alba" (2009), "Delightful Doomsday" (2010), and "Nachtflug" (2011)). Binaria also collaborated with the singer Cassini for the single "Rueda" (2007). In January 2007, Yanagi formed the musical unit Inochi Kokonotsu with composer KTG (an acronym of Ken The Garage), and the group put out a single album, Tortoiseshell (トーティシェル), on April 29, 2007, before disbanding in June 2007. Yanagi sang and composed ending song "~Tsuki no Terasu~" for the dōjinshi visual novel Moonshine (月照～ツキノテラス～) released on July 31, 2007.

As early as 2007, Yanagi began submitting cover versions of songs to the Nico Nico Douga video sharing website under the name Gazelle. Roughly the next day after Supercell's songwriter Ryo uploaded the music group's first song "Melt" in December 2007, Yanagi uploaded a cover of her singing the song. Yanagi, who was herself a fan of Ryo's music, contacted him and the two talked about someday collaborating. Ryo, who had been a fan of Yanagi's voice even before uploading his own songs to Nico Nico Douga, approached her to sing the vocals for Supercell's debut single "Kimi no Shiranai Monogatari" (2009). Yanagi continued as the vocalist of Supercell until 2011, and in that time provided vocals for two more singles in 2010—"Sayonara Memories" and "Utakata Hanabi / Hoshi ga Matataku Konna Yoru ni"—and Supercell's second studio album Today Is A Beautiful Day (2011). Later in 2011, Yanagi sang two songs on the original soundtrack for Key's visual novel Rewrite.

=== 2012–2016: Solo debut ===
Yanagi collaborated with Jun Maeda of Key to produce the original concept album Owari no Hoshi no Love Song released on April 25, 2012. A single from the album, "Killer Song", was released at Comiket 81 on December 29, 2011. Yanagi made her solo debut signed to Geneon and Alfa Music with the single "Vidro Moyō" (ビードロ模様) released on February 29, 2012. "Vidro Moyō" is used as the ending theme to the 2012 anime series Waiting in the Summer. Yanagi's second single "Ambivalentidea" was released on June 6, 2012; the title track is used as the ending theme to the 2012 anime series Jormungand. Her third single "Laterality" (ラテラリティ) was released on November 7, 2012; the title track is used as the ending theme to Jormungand's second season Jormungand: Perfect Order.

Yanagi released her fourth single "Zoetrope" on January 30, 2013; the title track is used as the opening theme to the 2013 anime series Amnesia. Yanagi released her fifth single "Yukitoki" (ユキトキ) on April 17, 2013; the song is used as the opening theme to the 2013 anime series My Youth Romantic Comedy Is Wrong, As I Expected. Yanagi's solo debut album Euaru (エウアル) was released on July 3, 2013. Yanagi released her sixth single "Aqua Terrarium" (アクアテラリウム) on November 20, 2013; the song is used as the first ending theme to the 2013 anime series Nagi-Asu: A Lull in the Sea. Her seventh single "Mitsuba no Musubime" (三つ葉の結びめ) was released on February 19, 2014; the song is used as the second ending theme to Nagi-Asu. Yanagi's eighth single "Tokohana" (トコハナ) was released on June 4, 2014; the song is used as the ending theme to the 2014 anime series Black Bullet. The third song of the single is used in the Z-kai Group promotion video Cross Road (クロスロード) in collaboration with Makoto Shinkai. She made an appearance at Anime Festival Asia Singapore in November 2014.

Yanagi's second solo album Polyomino (ポリオミノ) was released on December 10, 2014. Her ninth single "Sweet Track" was released on December 24, 2014. Her tenth single "Foe" was released on March 18, 2015. Yanagi's 11th single "Harumodoki" (春擬き) was released on June 3, 2015; the song is used as the opening theme to the second season of My Youth Romantic Comedy Is Wrong, As I Expected. In July 2015, she made appearances at Japan Expo in Paris and Hyper Japan in London. She also made an appearance at SMASH! in Sydney in August 2015, and later at Anime Festival Asia Indonesia in September 2015. Her 12th single "Orarion" (オラリオン) was released on December 9, 2015; the song is used as the ending theme to the 2015 anime series Seraph of The End: Battle in Nagoya. Her 13th single "Kazakiri" (カザキリ) was released on February 24, 2016; the song is used as the opening theme to the 2016 anime series Norn9; Yanagi also played the role of Aion in the series. Yanagi's third solo album Follow My Tracks was released on April 20, 2016. Yanagi's 14th single "Meimoku no Kanata" (瞑目の彼方; lit. "Beyond Closed Eyes") was released on August 31, 2016; the song is used as the ending theme to the 2016 anime series Berserk. She appeared at Animax Carnival Malaysia in March 2016, and at Animax Carnival Philippines in October 2016.

=== 2017–present: Professional expansion ===
Yanagi collaborated with Yoshino Nanjō in performing the song "Issai wa Monogatari" (一切は物語; lit. "Everything is the Story") released on May 17, 2017; the song is used as the ending theme to the second season of Berserk. Her 15th single "Jikan wa Mado no Mukōgawa" (時間は窓の向こう側; lit. "Time Is on the Other Side of the Window") was released on August 2, 2017; the song is used as the ending theme for the 2017 anime series Chronos Ruler. Yanagi's 16th single "Over and Over" was released on November 1, 2017; the song was used as the opening theme for the 2017 anime series Just Because!, where she also served as the music producer. Her 17th single "Here and There / Satōdama no Tsuki" (砂糖玉の月) was released on November 1, 2017; "Here and There" and "Satōdama no Tsuki" was used as the opening and ending themes to the 2017 anime television series Kino's Journey – The Beautiful World.

Yanagi's fourth solo album "Natte" (ナッテ) was released on January 17, 2018. Her 18th single "Madōi Mirai" (間遠い未来; lit. "A Far-Away Future") was released on February 21, 2018; the song is used as the first ending theme to the 2018 anime series Hakyū Hōshin Engi. Her 19th single "Mukei no Outline" (無形のアウトライン; lit. " Intangible Outline") was released on May 30, 2018; the song is used as the second ending theme to Hakyū Hōshin Engi. Her 20th single "Mimei no Kimi to Hakumei no Mahō" (未明の君と薄明の魔法; lit. "Magical Twilight of Your Early Dawn") was released on October 31, 2018; the song is used as the ending theme to 2018 anime series Iroduku: The World in Colors. She was released two compilation albums titled Yanagi Nagi Best Album -Library- and Yanagi Nagi Best Album -Museum- on January 9, 2019. In August 2019, she performed in North America for the first time at Anime Revolution in Vancouver.

Her 21st single "Houseki no Umareru Toki" (宝石の生まれるとき; lit. "When Gemstones Are Born") was released on February 19, 2020; the song is used as the opening theme song to anime series The Case Files of Jeweler Richard. Her 22nd single "Megumi no Ame" (芽ぐみの雨; lit. "Sprouting Rain") was released on July 15, 2020; the song is used as the opening theme song to the third season of My Youth Romantic Comedy Is Wrong, As I Expected. (Note: This single was originally scheduled to be released on May 13, 2020, but was delayed due to the postponement of the anime because of the COVID-19 pandemic.) Her 23rd single "Kimi to Iu Shinwa" (君という神話; lit. "Your Myth") / "Goodbye Seven Seas" was released on October 28, 2020; "Kimi to Iu Shinwa" and "Goodbye Seven Seas" were used as the opening and ending themes to the 2020 anime television series The Day I Became a God. Her 24th single "Shirushibi" (標火; lit. "Mark of Fire") was released on November 3, 2021; the song is used as the ending theme song to the first season of the anime series The Faraway Paladin. Her 25th single was "Yukiharuame" (ユキハルアメ; lit. Snow, Spring and Rain), and her 26th single was "Inochibi" (命火; lit. Life of Fire), which was used as the opening theme of the second season of The Faraway Paladin. On March 20, 2024, she released an album "White Cube" (ホワイトキューブ). On April 15, 2025, she was signed to Jay Chou's record label, JVR Music.

== Artistry ==
=== Influences ===
Yanagi cites Akino Arai, Yoko Kanno, and Maaya Sakamoto as well as the 1996 song "Flower Crown" by the musical unit Goddess in the Morning as some of her musical influences; early on, she decided that she wanted to write music "just like Arai". In an interview with Japanese website Natalie, she describes how desktop music software was magical for her, as it allowed her to make music without playing instruments. She later bought an audio interface for the software to allow her to experiment more.

=== Musical style ===
In an interview with Animate Times, Yanagi discussed her experiences in making the single "Ambivalentidea", as well as her early career. She describes how she originally did not intend to pursue a career in music, as producing dōjin music was just a hobby and she was working at a non-music related job. She started out performing covers of songs, but due to positive reception online, she was persuaded to make original songs as well. For the single "Ambivalentidea", she wanted to incorporate Jormungand's theme of "contradiction" in the song. To accomplish this, she included figurative and abstract words in the song's lyrics. The song's title comes from the words ambivalent and idea, which when put together were intended to express the idea of a contradiction of visualization. In an interview with Natalie, she described how because she wanted the song to have a "more literary feel", she would frequently consult a dictionary while writing the lyrics.

In an interview with Entertainment Station, Yanagi discussed her role as music producer of the anime series Just Because!, and the making of the series' opening theme "Over and Over". It was the first time that she served as a music producer for an anime series, so she would discuss ideas with anime staff. As Just Because! is set in a high school, she set out to write music that would fit scenes, deciding when instruments such as the piano or guitar would be used depending on the scene. She used picture stories as references in making the soundtrack; she also used high school baseball cheering songs as references in writing a track for scenes involving baseball. The intro of "Over and Over" was influenced by two of her earlier songs "Yukitoki" and "Harumodoki", which were both used in My Youth Romantic Comedy Is Wrong, As I Expected. For the song, she wanted to incorporate the series plot point of transferring schools; she aimed for the song to have a happy feeling, but she took time finding a way to express it.

== Filmography ==
=== Anime ===
Year	Title	Role	Notes	Ref
2013	Norn9: Norn + Nonette	Aion	Voice role	

=== Video games ===
Year	Title	Role	Notes	Ref
2013	Norn9	Aion	Voice role	

== Discography ==
=== Albums ===
==== Studio albums ====
Year	Album details	Peak Oricon chart positions
2006	EN: Released: August 13, 2006; Label: CorLeonis; Format: CD	—
2007	Leonis: Released: March 21, 2007; Label: CorLeonis; Format: Web album	—
2008	Freirinite: Released: March 9, 2008; Label: CorLeonis; Format: CD	—
2010	Oort no Yume: Released: May 5, 2010; Label: CorLeonis; Format: CD	—
2012	Owari no Hoshi no Love Song: Released: April 25, 2012; Label: Flaming June (FJMC-0002, FJMC-0003); Format: CD, CD+DVD	6
2013	Euaru: Released: July 3, 2013; Label: Geneon (GNCA-1376, GNCA-1377, GNCA-1378); Format: CD, CD+DVD, CD+BD	4
2014	Polyomino: Released: December 10, 2014; Label: Geneon (GNCA-1421, GNCA-1422, GNCA-1423); Format: CD, CD+DVD, CD+BD	7
2016	Follow My Tracks: Released: April 20, 2016; Label: Geneon (GNCA-1477, GNCA-1478, GNCA-1479); Format: CD, CD+DVD, CD+BD	7
2018	Natte: Released: January 17, 2018; Label: Geneon (GNCA-1521, GNCA-1522, GNCA-1523); Format: CD, CD+DVD, CD+BD	10
2020	Emeraro Type: Released: December 9, 2020; Label: Geneon (GNCA-1593, GNCA-1594, GNCA-1595); Format: CD, CD+DVD, CD+BD	29
2022	Branch: Released: December 23, 2022; Label: Geneon (GNCA-1634, GNCA-1633); Format: CD, CD+BD	—
2024	White Cube: Released: March 20, 2024; Label: Geneon (GNCA-1657, GNCA-1656); Format: CD, CD+DVD, CD+BD	28
2025	ENcore: Released: June 25, 2025; Label: CorLenios; Format: CD	32
"—" denotes releases that did not chart.

==== Compilation albums ====
Year	Album details	Peak Oricon chart positions
2011	Ame no Umi: Released: September 6, 2011; Label: CorLeonis; Format: CD	—
2019	Yanagi Nagi Best Album -Library-: Released: January 9, 2019; Label: Geneon; Format: CD, CD+BD	11
2019	Yanagi Nagi Best Album -Museum-: Released: January 9, 2019; Label: Geneon; Format: CD, CD+BD	12
2019	Memorandum: Released: November 13, 2019; Label: NBCUniversal Entertainment Japan; Format: CD	29
2022	Yanagi Nagi 10th Anniversary Selection Album -Roundabout-: Released: February 23, 2022; Label: NBCUniversal Entertainment Japan; Format: CD, CD+BD	34
"—" denotes releases that did not chart.

=== Singles ===
Year	Song	Peak Oricon chart positions	Album
2011	"Hyōka no Kuni"	—	—N/a
2011	"Killer Song"	—	Owari no Hoshi no Love Song
2012	"Vidro Moyō"	11	Euaru
2012	"Ambivalentidea"	23	Euaru
2012	"Laterality"	20	Euaru
2013	"Zoetrope"	13	Euaru
2013	"Yukitoki"	17	Euaru
2013	"Aqua Terrarium"	22	Polyomino
2014	"Mitsuba no Musubime"	27	Polyomino
2014	"Tokohana"	12	Polyomino
2014	"Sweet Track"	68	Polyomino
2015	"Foe"	50	Follow My Tracks
2015	"Harumodoki"	8	Follow My Tracks
2015	"Orarion"	22	Follow My Tracks
2016	"Kazakiri"	30	Follow My Tracks
2016	"Meimoku no Kanata"	46	Natte
2017	"Jikan wa Mado no Mukōgawa"	58	Natte
2017	"Over and Over"	30	Natte
2017	"Here and There / Satōdama no Tsuki"	25	Natte
2018	"Madōi Mirai"	59	Yanagi Nagi Best Album -Library-
2018	"Mukei no Outline"	54	Yanagi Nagi Best Album -Library-
2018	"Mimei no Kimi to Hakumei no Mahō"	31	Yanagi Nagi Best Album -Museum-
2020	"Hōseki no Umareru Toki"	48	Emeraro Type
2020	"Megumi no Ame"	7	Emeraro Type
2021	"Shirushibi"	45	—N/a
2023	"Yukiharuame"	TBA	—N/a
"—" denotes releases that did not chart.

==== Digital singles ====
Year	Title	Album	Ref.
2022	"Branch"	Branch	
2022	"dream puff"	Branch	
2022	"Echo"	Branch	
2022	"more than enough"	Branch	
2022	"For good"	Branch	

==== Collaborations ====
Year	Songs	Peak Oricon chart positions	Album
2017	"Issai wa Monogatari" (with Yoshino Nanjō)	7	Nanjo Yoshino Best Album: The Memories Apartment -Anime-
2020	"Kimi to Iu Shinwa / Goodbye Seven Seas" (with Jun Maeda)	15	Yanagi Nagi 10th Anniversary Selection Album -Roundabout-
2020	"Natsu Nagi / Takaramono ni Natta Hi" (with Jun Maeda)	27	—N/a
2022	"Level" (with The Sixth Lie)	44	—N/a

=== Other album appearances ===
Year	Song	Album	Notes	Ref.
2007	"~Tsuki no Terasu~"	Moonshine Original Soundtrack	Ending song of dōjinshi visual novel Moonshine.	
2011	"Hitoshizuku"	Zone Tribute: Kimi ga Kureta Mono	Tribute album for the band Zone. "Hitoshizuku" is a cover of Zone's 2002 single.	
2011	"Koibumi" "Itsuwaranai Kimi e"	Rewrite Original Soundtrack	Soundtrack to Key's visual novel Rewrite. The songs are in original and short versions.	
2011	"Little Forest" "Reply"	Branch	Remix album to tracks from Rewrite	
2012	"Dr. Schrodinger, tell me please? (Mikoto's Theme)"	Time Travelers Original Soundtrack	Soundtrack to Level-5's video game Time Travelers; composed by Hideki Sakamoto.	
2012	"Koibumi" "Itsuwaranai Kimi e"	Circle of Fifth	Compilation album of songs composed by Shinji Orito.	
2012	"Koibumi"	Dye Mixture	Remix album to Key's visual novels Rewrite and Rewrite Harvest festa!	
2020	"re:fruition"	Frontiers	Fifth studio album for jazz fusion band Dezolve	
2022	"Rhythm Emotion"	Two-Mix Tribute Album: Crysta Rhythm	Tribute album for the band Two-Mix. "Rhythm Emotion" is a cover of Two-Mix's 2020 digital single.	
