= Cencoroll =

- Cencoroll DVD cover
- Directed by: Atsuya Uki
- Written by: Atsuya Uki
- Produced by: Hiroaki Takeuchi
- Starring: Kana Hanazawa; Hiro Shimono; Ryōhei Kimura; Satomi Moriya
- Music by: Ryo (Supercell)
- Production companies: Anime Innovation Tokyo; Aniplex
- Distributed by: Aniplex
- Release dates: July 28, 2009 (Canada); August 22, 2009 (Japan)
- Running time: 30 minutes
- Country: Japan
- Language: Japanese

Cencoroll (Japanese: センコロール, Hepburn: Senkorōru) is a 2009 Japanese animated science fiction action film written, designed, directed, and animated by manga author Atsuya Uki. Produced by Anime Innovation Tokyo and Aniplex, the film had its world premiere at Canada's Fantasia International Film Festival on July 28, 2009. The film made its Japanese debut on August 22, 2009, in Tokyo and Osaka. Cencoroll made its debut in the United States at the New York Anime Festival on September 25, 2009. A sequel, Cencoroll 2, was released on June 29, 2019, in a dual-screening featuring the first film as Cencoroll Connect. Another sequel titled Cencoroll 3 has been green-lit for production.

== Plot ==
In Cencoroll, large, mostly white amorphous creatures have been appearing in a town modeled after Sapporo, Hokkaidō, Japan. Tetsu (テツ) (Hiro Shimono) is a male high school student who keeps one such shapeshifting creature named Cenco (センコ, Senko), which he can control via telepathy, though wants to keep it a secret. An inquisitive girl named Yuki (ユキ) (Kana Hanazawa) chances upon Cenco at school when it is transformed into a bicycle. After Tetsu arrives to retrieve the bicycle, Yuki inadvertently causes Cenco to transform back into its normally large form by poking it in the eye. Yuki is much more interested in Cenco than Tetsu and accompanies them into town. There, a boy named Shū (シュウ) (Ryōhei Kimura), who controls two of the creatures, confronts Tetsu in order to obtain Cenco. Tetsu manages to fend off Shū's attacks while also protecting Yuki, and they leave while Shū's creature is incapacitated. Shū confronts Yuki later that day and gets her to tell Tetsu to meet and fight Shū again.

The following day, Shū takes Yuki hostage to force Tetsu to come, and places her on a ledge of a tall building. After Tetsu arrives, Shū attacks from afar and manages to cut off one of Cenco's arms. To repair the arm, Cenco removes one of Tetsu's arms, which incapacitates him momentarily. Shū arrives with a much larger creature and Cenco takes Yuki within its body where Tetsu already is. Yuki gets Cenco to change control of it from Tetsu to herself, and after Shū's larger creature eats Cenco along with Yuki, she manages to take control of the larger creature as well. They are subsequently attacked by the military with tanks and missiles, but are protected for the time being when Yuki changes the creature's shape to that of a massive walnut. Tetsu and Yuki are separated and Shū attempts to take control back from Yuki, but he cannot control the creature anymore and severs the link, effectively killing it. Tetsu makes it back with Cenco to where Yuki and Shū are, and Yuki knocks Shū out with Cenco transformed into a baseball bat. Afterwards, Yuki transforms Cenco into Tetsu's lost arm, which gives him back control of his limb. Shū is later shown having been rescued by his other creature.

== Production ==
Cencoroll is based on a one-shot manga entitled Amon Game (アモン・ゲーム), written and illustrated by Atsuya Uki. The manga won the Grand Prize in Kodansha's Spring 2005 Afternoon Shiki Shō, later being published in the September 2005 issue of Monthly Afternoon. In 2006, Anime Innovation Tokyo began an initiative to sponsor anime produced by independent animators and small studios and chose Cencoroll as their first sponsored project. In 2007, Uki created a Cencoroll short film and distributed it over the Internet; due to the praise it received, Uki decided to nearly singlehandedly write, design, direct, and animate a 30-minute Cencoroll film. Cencoroll marked the first time the production company Aniplex had agreed to back a project that was animated almost entirely by one person. Originally, the film was given the tentative title Untitle.

Ryo of Supercell produced the film's music. The film's theme song is "Love & Roll" by Supercell, and was released on August 12, 2009, on Supercell's debut single "Kimi no Shiranai Monogatari" (君の知らない物語) along with an instrumental track featured in the trailer for Cencoroll called "Theme of 'Cencoroll'".

== Release ==
Cencoroll had its world premiere at Canada's Fantasia International Film Festival on July 28, 2009, and was subtitled in English. The film was released to a small number of theaters in Tokyo and Osaka, Japan on August 22, 2009. Cencoroll made its debut in the United States at the New York Anime Festival on September 25, 2009, and was subtitled in English. A 90-second trailer was available at Tokyo International Anime Fair in March 2009, and three television commercials were released between July and August 2009. A DVD of the film in limited and regular editions was released by Aniplex on October 28, 2009.

== Reception ==
Justin Sevakis of Anime News Network (ANN) praised Cencoroll's "visual inventiveness", stating that it had "a raw and immediate feel." Sevakis' review was strongly positive, describing Cencoroll as defying "any and all expectations of both medium and genre." Cencoroll was awarded the Best Hokkaidō Production Award at the 2009 Sapporo International Short Film Festival and Market. The film was selected as a recommended work by the awards jury of the thirteenth Japan Media Arts Festival in 2009.
