= Supercell (band) =

Japanese band

- Origin: Japan
- Genres: J-pop; pop rock
- Years active: 2007–present
- Labels: Sony Music Records (2009–present); TamStar Records
- Members: Supercell: Ryo; Shirow Miwa; Huke; Redjuice; Suga; Maque; Yoshiki Usa; Hei8ro; Guitar; Crow; Golv; Guest vocalists: Ann; Gaku
- Past members: Supercell: 119; Guest vocalists: Nagi Yanagi (2009–2011, 2026); Koeda (2011–2013)
- Website: www.supercell.jp

Supercell (stylized as supercell) is an 11-member Japanese pop rock band led by musician and songwriter Ryo, which formed in 2007 as a doujin music band. The other 10 members are artists and designers who provide illustrations in album booklets and music videos. Supercell started out by making use of the Hatsune Miku Vocaloid singing synthesizer to produce vocals for songs submitted to the Nico Nico Douga video sharing website, releasing their independent debut single "Melt" at Comiket 73 in 2007. The popularity of the songs led the band to release their independent self-titled album Supercell (2008). Supercell later signed to Sony Music Entertainment Japan and had a professional release of their Supercell album in March 2009, which was updated with more songs.

Supercell made a transition to vocalist Nagi Yanagi with their major label debut single "Kimi no Shiranai Monogatari" (2009). Two more singles featuring Yanagi were released in 2010, followed by Supercell's second album Today Is A Beautiful Day (2011), which was Yanagi's last contribution with Supercell. Following Yanagi's departure, Supercell held auditions for vocalists, and 15-year-old female singer Koeda was chosen out of about 2,000 candidates. Koeda's first single with Supercell is "My Dearest" (2011), and four more singles featuring Koeda were released between 2012 and 2013, followed by Supercell's third album Zigaexperientia (2013), which was Koeda's last contribution with Supercell. In 2019, Supercell chose the singers Ann and Gaku to be their new vocalists.

Supercell and Today Is A Beautiful Day were awarded a Gold Disc by the Recording Industry Association of Japan for having exceeded 100,000 copies shipped in a single year, and Supercell was chosen as one of the best five new Japanese artists of 2009 during the 2010 Japan Gold Disc Award competition.

== History ==
=== 2007–2008: Formation and indie releases ===
On December 7, 2007, Ryo submitted the song "Melt" (メルト, Meruto) to the Nico Nico Douga video sharing website, and since then the video has been viewed over 14 million times. For the song's vocals, Ryo used the Vocaloid singing synthesizer software Hatsune Miku, and he used an illustration of Miku by an artist named 119 (pronounced Hikeshi) on the video without his permission. After Ryo contacted 119 with an apology, 119 responded with great interest in "Melt" and began to work together with Ryo, thus forming Supercell. More members joined Supercell since its formation, which led to 11 members by the time the group made its major debut. In an article in The Japan Times, Ryo admitted that he did not have any "big intentions" in uploading "Melt" to Nico Nico Douga and was not someone who "set out to find success" as he put it.

Ryo chose to distribute his music on Nico Nico Douga because he liked the website along with its response system, which enables user's comments to appear overlaid on the video screen. Ryo did not originally intend to use Hatsune Miku as the vocalist for his songs, and most members of Supercell did not even know of Miku until after "Melt" gained popularity. Since Ryo did not know any singers, he was recommended by his friends to use Miku, which he thought was a good idea since videos using Miku were already widely being distributed on Nico Nico Douga at the time.

In 2008, Supercell continued to release songs on Nico Nico Douga which quickly became popular. Supercell's releases of "Koi wa Sensō" (恋は戦争) on February 22, "World is Mine" (ワールドイズマイン, Wārudo izu Main) on May 31, and "Black Rock Shooter" (ブラック★ロックシューター, Burakku Rokku Shūtā) on June 13; all have received over 4 million views. Ryo composed the song "Kibō no Neiro" (キボウノネイロ), released as a limited edition image song CD with the fifth volume of Shū Shirase's light novel series Oto × Maho on July 15, 2008. The song was released in two versions: one sung by Hatsune Miku sold at Animate and one sung by the human singer Sari sold at Comic Toranoana. At Comiket 74 in August 2008, Supercell released the independent self-titled album Supercell containing their most popular songs in addition to several previously unreleased tracks. On December 12, 2008, Supercell released "Hajimete no Koi ga Owaru Toki" (初めての恋が終わる時) on Nico Nico Douga, which has since received over 3 million views.

=== 2009–2011: Major debut and vocalist Nagi Yanagi ===
Supercell made their major debut with Sony Music Entertainment Japan with the professional release of their Supercell album on March 4, 2009. The updated release included the art book originally bundled with the indie version, contained more songs than the original, and included a DVD with music videos for four songs. The album obtained a No. 4 ranking on Oricon's weekly albums chart, and in June 2009 was awarded the Gold Disc by the Recording Industry Association of Japan for having exceeded 100,000 copies shipped in a single year. Ryo approached singer Nagi Yanagi to be the vocalist for Supercell's major debut single "Kimi no Shiranai Monogatari" (君の知らない物語), who was known for her uploads to Nico Nico Douga under the name Gazelle. The single was released on August 12, 2009 and ranked No. 5 on Oricon's weekly singles chart. The song "Kimi no Shiranai Monogatari" was used as the ending theme song for the 2009 Bakemonogatari anime series, and the single also included two tracks featured in the 2009 animated film Cencoroll. Supercell was chosen as one of the best five new Japanese artists of 2009 during the 2010 Japan Gold Disc Award competition.

A second single, "Sayonara Memories" (さよならメモリーズ), was released on February 10, 2010. Supercell's third single, "Utakata Hanabi / Hoshi ga Matataku Konna Yoru ni" (うたかた花火 / 星が瞬くこんな夜に), is a double A-side and was released on August 25, 2010. "Utakata Hanabi" was used as the 14th ending theme for the Naruto: Shippuden anime series and "Hoshi ga Matataku Konna Yoru ni" was used as the ending theme for Type-Moon's visual novel Mahōtsukai no Yoru. Supercell released a split single in collaboration with Kz of Livetune called "Kotchi Muite Baby / Yellow" (こっち向いて Baby / Yellow) on July 14, 2010 by Sony Music Direct, which is the theme song of Hatsune Miku: Project DIVA 2nd. Ryo composed "Kotchi Muite Baby" and Livetune composed "Yellow"; both songs are sung by Hatsune Miku. Supercell produced the song "Hero" (ヒーロー) as a theme song to Shueisha's manga magazine Aoharu, a special edition version of Young Jump, which had its first issue on November 30, 2010.

A 50-minute original video animation project titled Black Rock Shooter was released on July 24, 2010 based on the song "Black Rock Shooter" and its original music video featuring illustrations by Huke. A "Pilot Edition" of the anime was released on DVD and Blu-ray Disc on September 30, 2009. Ryo and Huke collaborated on the project with supervisor Yutaka Yamamoto and his animation studio Ordet; Shinobu Yoshioka directed the project. Black Rock Shooter is Ordet's first solo production as the main animation studio. Some footage of the anime was shown at Anime Expo on July 4, 2010.

In late 2010, Shibuya, Tokyo-based company INCS toenter established the major record label TamStar Records for musicians and artists who originally made their debut as dōjin music artists online. Supercell joined the label as one of the inaugural members, including others such as Livetune, Gom, Rapbit, and Nagi Yanagi. Supercell collaborated on a compilation album titled TamStar Records Collection Vol. 0 released as a limited edition at Comiket 79 in December 2010; on the album is Ryo's "Kibō no Neiro" sung by Hatsune Miku and "Ashita e" (アシタヘ) sung by Rapbit and Clear. TamStar Records released a remix album of Supercell's debut album Supercell as a tribute to the band titled Stowaways on January 17, 2011. Supercell released their second studio album Today Is A Beautiful Day on March 16, 2011, which was Yanagi's last contribution with Supercell.

=== 2011–2013: Vocalist Koeda ===
Supercell held auditions from May 25 to June 19, 2011 for a guest vocalist on the band's third album. The main criteria for the vocalist was his or her voice, as Supercell was not concerned with the singer's gender or age. Out of about 2,000 candidates, then 15-year-old female singer Koeda was chosen. Also, then 17-year-old female singer Chelly was selected to be the vocalist for Ryo's separate music act Egoist. Supercell collaborated with the dōjin musician Dixie Flatline to produce the split single "Sekiranun Graffiti (積乱雲グラフィティ) / Fallin' Fallin' Fallin'" released on August 31, 2011 by Sony Music Direct. Ryo composed "Sekiranun Graffiti" and Dixie Flatline composed "Fallin' Fallin' Fallin'"; both songs are sung by Hatsune Miku. "Sekiranun Graffiti" is used as the opening theme to Hatsune Miku: Project DIVA Extend. The theme songs for the 2011 anime series Guilty Crown were produced by Ryo. The band's fourth single "My Dearest" and was released on November 23, 2011; the song was used as the anime's first opening theme.

Supercell's fifth single, also released on March 7, 2012, is the double A-side "Kokuhaku / Bokura no Ashiato" (告白 / 僕らのあしあと). "Kokuhaku" was used as Guilty Crown's second ending theme, and "Bokura no Ashiato" was used as the ending theme to the 2012 anime series Black Rock Shooter. Ryo wrote the song "Light My Fire" sung by Kotoko, which was used as the first opening theme to the 2011 anime series Shakugan no Shana Final. Ryo also wrote the song "Naisho no Hanashi" sung by ClariS, which was used as the ending theme to the 2012 anime series Nisemonogatari. Ryo collaborated with the dōjin musician Jin to produce the split single "Odds & Ends / Sky of Beginning" released on August 29, 2012 by Sony Music Direct. Ryo composed "Odds & Ends" and Jin composed "Sky of Beginning"; both songs are sung by Hatsune Miku. "Odds & Ends" is the opening theme song to Hatsune Miku: Project DIVA F.

In 2012, designer Yoshika Usa collaborated with illustrator Tomoko Fujinoko to create the manga Wooser's Hand-to-Mouth Life, which was adapted into a CG anime series by Sanzigen in 2012. The anime's ending theme song "Love Me Gimme" (ラブミーギミー, Rabu Mī Gimī) by Tia is written by Ryo, who has continued to produce music for the singer. Supercell's sixth single "Gin'iro Hikōsen" (銀色飛行船) was released on December 19, 2012; the song is used as the opening theme to the 2012 anime film Nerawareta Gakuen. Supercell's seventh single "The Bravery" was released on March 13, 2013; the song is used as the second ending theme to the 2012 anime series Magi: The Labyrinth of Magic. Supercell's eighth single "Hakushukassai Utaawase" (拍手喝采歌合) was released on June 12, 2013; the song is used as the opening theme for the 2013 rebroadcast of the 2010 anime series Katanagatari. Supercell released their third studio album Zigaexperientia on November 27, 2013, which was Koeda's last contribution with Supercell.

=== 2015–present: Vocalists Ann and Gaku and Nagi Yanagi return ===
Ryo composed the music for the 2015 video game Bravely Second: End Layer. Ryo produced the single "Great Distance" featuring Chelly released on May 20, 2015; this song is used as the opening theme song to Bravely Second. Also included on the single is "Last Song", which is used as the ending theme to Bravely Second. Ryo released the digital single "Tsumi no Namae" (罪の名前) featuring Hatsune Miku on June 8, 2016. Supercell took applications for a new vocalist from July 11 to August 31, 2016. Supercell announced they had chosen Ann and Gaku as their new vocalists on July 29, 2019, and they also released a music video of their new single "#Love" featuring both vocalists. Supercell's ninth single "#Love feat. Ann, Gaku" was released on September 11, 2019; the song was used as the theme song for the 2019 film Cencoroll Connect.

After fifteen years since her departure, Nagi Yanagi would return as Supercell's vocalist on September 30, 2026 for "Yoru to Ao" (夜と青), the theme song of the 2026 Mahōtsukai no Yoru animated film.

== Musical style and influences ==
Daniel Robson of The Japan Times described Supercell's music as "sentimental J-pop...[that] also explores the genre's jazzier, spunkier and dancier elements." Their sound has been compared to pop singers Aiko and Yui, and Ryo has stated himself that he likes expressing human emotions in his music. When creating a song, Ryo has often hummed a tune into a digital recorder, or starts by playing the piano. While it depends on the song, Ryo has stated he generally "play[s] the piano and take[s] notes of the chord progression" and then writes the lyrics. Ryo has cited "artists that blend rock and hip-hop styles with today's latest technology" as influencing his music, including: Massive Attack, Boom Boom Satellites, Portishead, Tricky, and Unkle.

Ryo found it difficult at first to write "tenderhearted" lyrics for songs meant to be sung by young women. When describing the lyrics for his songs using Hatsune Miku as the vocalist, Ryo felt that writing without hesitation based on his initial ideas with minimal editing was best, because the singer, as a computer program, would not feel embarrassed about singing the lyrics. He admitted that his friends would laugh when he played the songs, but he thought that "if a 16-year-old girl is supposed to be singing...it is best if she sings about romance." When writing lyrics for human singers, Ryo takes more care in writing lyrics that singers would not be embarrassed to sing. When Ryo receives an offer to compose theme music, he writes lyrics that tie in with the theme and mood of the given work, such as the ending themes "Kimi no Shiranai Monogatari" for the anime Bakemonogatari, and "Hoshi ga Matataku Konna Yoru ni" for the visual novel Mahōtsukai no Yoru.

== Members ==
Supercell is made up of 11 members led by Ryo, who produces the music and writes the lyrics. The other 10 members provide illustrations, animation, design, and photography in album booklets, cases and music videos.

- Ryo (music, lyrics)
- Shirow Miwa (illustration)
- Huke (illustration)
- Redjuice (illustration)
- Suga (illustration)
- Maque (illustration and animation)
- Yoshiki Usa at Wooserdesign (design)
- Hei8ro (Heihachiro) (support in illustration and photography)
- Guitar (support in illustration)
- Crow (support)
- Golv (support)

Former members

- 119 (Hikeshi) (illustration)

Guest vocalists

- Nagi Yanagi (2009–2011)
- Koeda (2011–2013)
- Ann (2019–present)
- Gaku (2019–present)

== Discography ==
=== Studio albums ===
List of albums, with selected chart positions and certifications
Title	Album details	Peak positions					Sales (JPN) (Note: Sales provided by Oricon database and are rounded to the nearest thousand copies.)	Certifications
Title	Album details	JPN	KOR (Note: Week references for Gaon: Supercell, Today Is a Beautiful Day Zigaexperientia.)	KOR Overseas (Note: Week references for Gaon: Supercell, Today Is a Beautiful Day Zigaexperientia.)	TWN	TWN East Asian (Note: Week references for G-Music: Supercell 2011 week 37 and 2012 week 9, Today Is a Beautiful Day 2011 week 49, "My Dearest" 2011 week 49, "Sekiranun Graffiti / Fallin' Fallin' Fallin'" 2011 week 37, "Kotchi Muite Baby / Yellow" 2012 week 9, "Kokuhaku / Bokura no Ashiato" 2013 week 32, "Odds & Ends / Sky of Beginning" 2012 week 50, "Gin'iro Hikōsen" 2012 week 51, "The Bravery" 2013 week 11, Zigaexperientia 2013 week 48.)	Sales (JPN)	Certifications
Supercell	Released: March 4, 2009 (JPN); Label: Sony Music Records; Formats: CD+DVD+Image collection, CD+DVD	4	63	9	13	4	109,000	RIAJ: Gold
Today Is a Beautiful Day	Released: March 16, 2011 (JPN); Label: Sony Music Records; Formats: CD, CD+DVD	3	48	2	—	10	88,000	RIAJ: Gold
Zigaexperientia	Released: November 27, 2013 (JPN); Label: Sony Music Records; Formats: CD, CD+DVD, CD+Blu-ray	7	32	3	—	9	45,000	

=== Singles ===
List of singles, with selected chart positions and certifications
Title	Year	Peak chart positions			Sales (JPN)	Certifications	Album
Title	Year	JPN Oricon	JPN Hot 100 (Note: Sources for chart positions are as follows: "Kimi no Shiranai Monogatari", "Sayonara Memories", "Kotchi Muite Baby", "Utakata Hanabi", "My Dearest", "Kokuhaku", "Bokura no Ashiato", "Gin'iro Hikōsen", "Odds & Ends", "The Bravery", "Hakushukassai Utaawase", "Great Distance")	TWN East Asian	Sales (JPN)	Certifications	Album
"Melt" (Note: As "Ryo feat. Hatsune Miku", cover additionally lists "Supercell 01".)	2007	—	—	—			Supercell
"Kimi no Shiranai Monogatari" (Note: 君の知らない物語 ("The Story You Don't Know"))	2009	5	9	—	105,000	RIAJ (download): 2× Platinum; RIAJ (physical): Gold	Today Is a Beautiful Day
"Sayonara Memories" (Note: さよならメモリーズ ("Goodbye Memories"))	2010	7	31	—	36,000		Today Is a Beautiful Day
"Utakata Hanabi" (Note: うたかた花火 ("Bubble Fireworks"))	2010	9	24	—	31,000		Today Is a Beautiful Day
"Hoshi ga Matataku Konna Yoru ni" (Note: 星が瞬くこんな夜に ("In Star Twinkling Nights Like These"))	2010	9	—	—	31,000		Today Is a Beautiful Day
"My Dearest"	2011	10	22	13	55,000	RIAJ (digital): Gold	Zigaexperientia
"Kokuhaku" (Note: 告白 ("Confession"))	2012	8	28	11	43,000		Zigaexperientia
"Bokura no Ashiato" (Note: 僕らのあしあと ("Our Footprints"))	2012	8	90	11	43,000		Zigaexperientia
"Gin'iro Hikōsen" (Note: 銀色飛行船 ("Silver Blimp"))	2012	11	26	14	14,000		Zigaexperientia
"The Bravery"	2013	11	17	17	18,000		Zigaexperientia
"Hakushukassai Utaawase" (Note: 拍手喝采歌合 ("Applause Contest"))	2013	9	17	—	27,000	RIAJ (digital): Gold	Zigaexperientia
"#Love feat. Ann, Gaku"	2019	44	—	—	1,818		Non-album singles
"Yoru to Ao"	2026	TBA					Non-album singles

==== Other singles ====
List of singles, with selected chart positions
Title	Year	Peak chart positions				Sales (JPN)
Title	Year	JPN Oricon (Note: Additional collaboration references: "Kotchi Muite Baby / Yellow", "Sekiranun Graffiti / Fallin' Fallin' Fallin'", "Odds & Ends / Sky of Beginning".)	JPN Hot 100	TWN	TWN East Asian	Sales (JPN)
"Kotchi Muite Baby" (Note: こっち向いて Baby ("Face This Way Baby")) (by Ryo feat. Hatsune Miku / Split with "Yellow" by Livetune)	2010	9	63	13	5	23,000
"Sekiranun Graffiti" (Note: 積乱雲グラフィティ ("Cumulonimbus Graffiti")) (by Ryo feat. Hatsune Miku / Split with "Fallin' Fallin' Fallin'" by Dixie Flatline)	2011	19	— (Note: Charted at number 16 on the Hot Singles Sales chart.)	—	4	9,000
"Odds&Ends" (by Ryo feat. Hatsune Miku / Split with "Sky of Beginning" by Jin)	2012	14	20	—	3	23,000
"Great Distance" (by Ryo feat. Chelly)	2015	18	33	—	—	11,500
"Tsumi no Namae" (Note: 罪の名前 ("Name of the Sin")) (Note: Released exclusively as a digital single.) (by Ryo feat. Hatsune Miku)	2016	—	—	—	—	
"Takt" (by Ryo feat. Mafumafu, Gaku)	2021	50	—	—	—	1,390
"waraunijuujinnkaku" (by Ryo feat. yoei)	2023	—	—	—	—	
"fate and struggle / I promise you" (by Ryo feat. Hiro (My First Story))	2024	—	—	—	—	
"CPK! Remix" (by Ryo feat. Nagi Yanagi, Hatsune Miku)	2026	26	—	—	—	1,217
"Ex-Otogibanashi" (by Ryo feat. Kaguya (CV: Yūko Natsuyoshi), Yachiyo Runami (CV: Saori Hayami))	2026	20	—	—	—	1,455
"Legends" (by Ryo feat. Hatsune Miku)	2026	63	—	—	—	
"1996" (by Ryo feat. Hatsune Miku)	2026	—	—	—	—	

==== Other charted songs ====
List of songs not released as singles, with selected chart positions and certifications
Title	Year	Peak chart positions	Certifications	Album
Title	Year	RIAJ Digital Track Chart	Certifications	Album
"Black Rock Shooter" (Note: Burakku Rokku Shūtā (ブラック★ロックシューター))	2009	—	RIAJ (digital): Gold	Supercell
"Melt" (Note: Meruto (メルト))	2009	—	RIAJ (cellphone): Gold	Supercell
"World Is Mine" (Note: Wārudo Izu Main (ワールドイズマイン))	2009	—	RIAJ (cellphone): Gold	Supercell
"Hero" (Note: Hīrō (ヒーロー))	2011	62		Today Is a Beautiful Day

=== Music videos ===
Year	Song	Director(s)
2009	"Kimi no Shiranai Monogatari"	Hirohisa Sasaki
2010	"Sayonara Memories"	Takahiro Miki; Taiki Ueda
2010	"Kotchi Muite Baby"	Takuya Imamura
2010	"Utakata Hanabi"	Kazuto Nakazawa
2011	"Perfect Day"	Ryōsuke Nakamura
2011	"Sekiranun Graffiti"	Yūichi Takahashi
2011	"My Dearest"	Ryūji Seki
2012	"Kokuhaku"	Ryūji Seki
2012	"Bokura no Ashiato"	Ryūji Seki
2012	"Odds & Ends"	
2012	"Gin'iro Hikōsen"	Kazuaki Seki
2013	"The Bravery"	Kazuaki Seki
2013	"Hakushukassai Utaawase"	Hideaki Fukui
2013	"No.525300887039"	Kazuaki Seki
2019	"#Love feat. Ann, Gaku"	

=== Other album appearances ===
Year	Song(s)	Album	Ref.
2009	"Black Rock Shooter"	Nico Nico Douga Selection: Sainō no Mudazukai	
2009	"Melt" "World is Mine"	Hatsune Miku Best: Memories	
2009	"Black Rock Shooter" "Koi wa Sensō"	Hatsune Miku Best: Impacts	
2010	"Hajimete no Koi ga Owaru Toki" "Kotchi Muite Baby" "Melt"	Hatsune Miku: Project Diva 2nd Nonstop Mix Collection	
2010	"Ashita e" "Kibō no Neiro"	TamStar Records Collection Vol. 0	
2011	"Kimi no Shiranai Monogatari"	Bakemonogatari Ongaku Zenshū Songs & Soundtracks	
2012	"Hoshi ga Matataku Konna Yoru ni"	Mahōtsukai no Yoru Original Soundtrack	
2012	"Utakata Hanabi"	Naruto Greatest Hits!!!!!	
2012	"E.D.E.N"	TamStar Records presents All Vocaloid Attack #1	

=== Other video album appearances ===
Year	Song(s)	Video album	Artist(s)	Notes	Ref.
2010	"Black Rock Shooter" "World is Mine"	Hatsune Miku DVD: Memories	Various artists	A collection of music videos related to Hatsune Miku.	
2010	"Koi wa Sensō"	Hatsune Miku DVD: Impacts	Various artists	A collection of music videos related to Hatsune Miku.	
2010	"Melt" "World is Mine"	Miku no Hi Kanshasai 39's Giving Day Project Diva Presents Hatsune Miku Solo Concert: Konban wa, Hatsune Miku desu.	Various artists		
