= Supercell (album) =

2009 album by Supercell

Studio album by Supercell
- Released: March 4, 2009
- Recorded: 2007–2008
- Genre: J-pop
- Length: 48:34
- Label: Sony Music
- Producer: Kazumitsu Shimizu

Supercell chronology
Supercell (2009)	Today Is A Beautiful Day (2011)

Supercell (stylized as supercell) is the debut studio album of Japanese J-pop band Supercell, released on March 4, 2009 by Sony Music. Supercell had originally released a dōjin (independent) version at Comiket 74 on August 16, 2008, before the band signed a record deal with Sony Music. The album contains twelve music tracks written by Ryo and the singing synthesizer Hatsune Miku was used to provide the vocals.

The major release of the album featured two songs not on the independent (indie) version, "Melt" and "Hajimete no Koi ga Owaru Toki", but which had already previously been released online and on the Nico Nico Douga video sharing website. All of the music on the indie release was remixed and remastered for the major release to greatly improve the sound quality. The album was released in limited and regular editions, each containing a bonus DVD containing music videos for four of the songs, but only the limited edition came bundled with a special illustration booklet titled Supercell Works; the indie release also came with the booklet. Supercell peaked at No. 4 on the Japanese Oricon weekly albums chart, and in June 2009 was awarded a Gold Disc by the Recording Industry Association of Japan for having exceeded 100,000 copies shipped in a single year.

== Production ==
Original recordings of songs on Supercell date back to the release of the song "Melt" online on the Nico Nico Douga video sharing website on December 7, 2007. Composer and lyricist Ryo used the Vocaloid singing synthesizer software Hatsune Miku for the vocals and continued to use the program for the remaining songs on the album. The video of "Melt" posted online used an illustration of Miku without the permission of the drawing's illustrator 119 (pronounced Hikeshi). After Ryo contacted 119 with an apology, 119 responded with great interest in "Melt" and began to work together with Ryo, thus forming Supercell.

Supercell continued to gain members—including the illustrators Shirow Miwa, Redjuice, and Huke—and released three more songs online in 2008: "Koi wa Sensō" on February 22, "The World Is Mine" on May 31, and "Black Rock Shooter" on June 13. Ryo continued to be the sole member involved in musical composition and the writing of lyrics, while the other members provided illustrations, animation, design, and photography in album booklets, cases, and music videos. At Comiket 74 on August 16, 2008, Supercell released a dōjin (independent) version of Supercell containing the three songs released earlier that year, in addition to seven previously unreleased songs; "Melt" was not included on the indie release. The album also came with a DVD containing music videos for three of the songs. On December 12, 2008, Supercell released "Hajimete no Koi ga Owaru Toki" on Nico Nico Douga, and was the last song Supercell posted on the website.

"Heartbreaker" (2008)
"Heartbreaker" on the independent release.

"Heartbreaker" (2009)
"Heartbreaker" on Sony Music's release; the tempo of the song was increased with the re-recording.

By that time, Supercell had signed a record deal with Sony Music, which announced plans to re-release Supercell in March 2009 with remastered tracks to greatly improve the sound quality of the music, as well as plans to include "Melt" and "Hajimete no Koi ga Owaru Toki" on the album. With the exception of the synthesized percussion used in the songs, the five songs originally released online, and the songs on the album's indie version, are substantially different compared to the major release. Like the indie version, the album would come bundled with a DVD containing music videos for four of the songs, including the six music videos previously released with the indie version, plus three more. By the time Supercell made its major debut, the group contained 11 members, not including 119 who left the group after the indie release of Supercell.

=== Composition ===
Supercell boasts a diversity of subjects and themes in regards to the lyrics and musical style. "Koi wa Sensō" (literally "Love is War") uses the concept of never giving up in regards to love, and was composed with the intention of it being the first track on the album. Ryo wanted the song to have a "cool" feeling, and cited The White Stripes' "Blue Orchid" as an influence, as it too is the first song on their fifth album Get Behind Me Satan. Ryo began writing the lyrics for "Koi wa Sensō" on New Year's Day 2008, and by mid-January, the song's composition was also complete. "Sono Ichibyō Slow Motion" (literally "That One Second Slow Motion") features the concept of love at first sight—specifically the single moment when this occurs; for all the songs on the album, Ryo described the song as a typical pop song he would create.

Ryo experimented with other music genres, such as using the image of a "garage band's vigorous performance" for "Usotsuki no Parade" (literally "Liar Parade"). "Heartbreaker" was written to sound like a song from a somewhat old-fashioned band, and the aim for "Hinekuremono" (literally "A Rebel") was to make an oldies-like feeling song. Like "Koi wa Sensō", powerful emotions are used as a concept in other songs, such as "Melt", which is described as a song that depicts a vibrant, trembling girl's emotions; or "The World Is Mine", which uses the concept of a selfish, but cute girl. "Parting" is used as the theme in "Hajimete no Koi ga Owaru Toki" (literally "When My First Love Ends") and was written to tell the story of an unrequited love. Ryo took about half a day to compose "Hajimete no Koi ga Owaru Toki", leaving the mixing and arrangement to take the most time. In contrast to the other songs, "Kurukuru Mark no Sugoi Yatsu" was written with a different impression where Ryo wanted to convey the fun of a comical song. For the song "Black Rock Shooter", Ryo was inspired by an illustration of an original character by Huke and created the song based on that character.

When writing lyrics for the songs on Supercell, Ryo felt that writing without hesitation based on his initial ideas with minimal editing was best, because the singer, as a computer program, would not feel embarrassed about singing the lyrics. Ryo found it difficult at first with writing lyrics for songs meant to be sung by young women. He admitted that his friends would laugh when he played the songs, but he thought that "if a 16-year-old girl is supposed to be singing...it is best if she sings about romance."

In addition to Ryo using a synthesizer as the main musician, guitarist Okiya Okoshi and bass guitarist Miruku "Hime" Kokumaro are credited on the songs "Line" and "Sono Ichibyō Slow Motion". Furthermore, Sariya provided the inhalation of breath for these two songs in order to make the vocals seem more authentic. Ryo cited an unnamed friend as providing the guitar in "The World Is Mine" and "Hajimete no Koi ga Owaru Toki". The major release of Supercell was mixed by Keiji Kondo, Yasuo Matsumoto, and Okuda Supa; Hidekazu Sakai provided the mastering.

=== Artwork ===
The limited edition of the major release of Supercell, as well as the indie version, came bundled with a 36-page illustration booklet titled Supercell Works. The booklet contains color illustrations for ten of the songs, as well as comments by the illustrators, an interview of Ryo, and other details about the songs and artwork, including lyrics. The two songs "Hajimete no Koi ga Owaru Toki" and "Mata ne" are excluded from the booklet. The albums' packaging, designed by Yoshiki Usa, includes the song lyrics and some of the illustrations featured in Supercell Works, but while the lyrics for "Mata ne" are included, no illustration is provided. The illustrators for the songs are members of Supercell (excluding the artist 119 who is a former member) and are listed below with the track listing. The cover art features an illustration of Hatsune Miku by Shirow Miwa on a cloudy sky background designed by Maque.

== Release and reception ==
Supercell was released in limited and regular editions on March 4, 2009 as a CD, bundled with a DVD containing music videos for four of the songs, by Sony Music in Japan. For the week of March 3, 2009 on the Japanese Oricon daily albums chart, Supercell was reported to have sold approximately 20,000 copies on the first day of its release, peaking at No. 2. For the week of March 16, 2009 on Oricon's weekly albums chart, Supercell was reported to have sold about 56,000 copies in its first week of sales, peaking at No. 4, and charted for 40 weeks. This was a record for Hatsune Miku-related albums, having beaten out the previous record holder Re:package (2008) by Livetune, which peaked at No. 5. By the week of March 30, 2009 on Oricon's weekly albums chart, Supercell was reported to have sold over 70,000 copies, and ranked at No. 24. Furthermore, for the week of April 6, 2009 on Oricon's weekly albums chart, Supercell ranked at No. 36, along with three other Hatsune Miku-related albums: Re:Mikus by Livetune (No. 18), Unformed by Doriko (No. 26), and Exit Tunes Presents Vocarhythm feat. Hatsune Miku by Super Producers (No. 96). "The World Is Mine" was also ranked No. 3 on the Billboard US World Digital Song Sales Chart in October 2011.

In June 2009, Supercell was awarded a Gold Disc by the Recording Industry Association of Japan for having exceeded 100,000 copies shipped in a single year. The sell ratio of those who reserved Supercell online was reported by the Asahi Shimbun to be 55%/45% for men/women. The album's producer Kazumitsu Shimizu stated that while it is not rare for something related to Japanese Internet culture to typically have a 90% support from males, the female support for the album was described as "very strong".

== Track listing ==
All tracks are written by Ryo.

Independent release
No.	Title	Length
1.	"Koi wa Sensō" (恋は戦争 Love Is War)	3:57
2.	"Heartbreaker" (ハートブレイカー Hātobureikā)	4:39
3.	"Black Rock Shooter" (ブラック★ロックシューター Burakku Rokku Shūtā)	4:50
4.	"Kurukuru Mark no Sugoi Yatsu" (くるくるまーくのすごいやつ Let's Spin Wildly)	3:42
5.	"Line" (ライン Rain)	4:53
6.	"The World Is Mine" (ワールドイズマイン Wārudo Izu Main)	4:13
7.	"Usotsuki no Parade" (嘘つきのパレード The Liar's Parade)	3:53
8.	"Sono Ichibyō Slow Motion" (その一秒 スローモーション That One Second, in Slow Motion)	4:08
9.	"Hinekuremono" (ひねくれ者 The Rebel)	4:12
10.	"Mata Ne" (またね See You Soon)	0:41
Total length:		39:08

Major release
No.	Title	Illustrator	Length
1.	"Koi wa Sensō" (恋は戦争 Love Is War)	Shirow Miwa	3:58
2.	"Heartbreaker" (ハートブレイカー Hātobureikā)	Redjuice	4:21
3.	"Melt" (メルト Meruto)	119	4:17
4.	"Black Rock Shooter" (ブラック★ロックシューター Burakku Rokku Shūtā)	Huke	4:53
5.	"Kurukuru Mark no Sugoi Yatsu" (くるくるまーくのすごいやつ Let's Spin Wildly)	Suga	3:43
6.	"Line" (ライン Rain)	Maque	4:55
7.	"The World Is Mine" (ワールドイズマイン Wārudo Izu Main)	Redjuice	4:13
8.	"Hajimete no Koi ga Owaru Toki" (初めての恋が終わる時 When Love Ends for the First Time)	Shirow Miwa	5:15
9.	"Usotsuki no Parade" (嘘つきのパレード The Liar's Parade)	Shirow Miwa	3:55
10.	"Sono Ichibyō Slow Motion" (その一秒 スローモーション That One Second, in Slow Motion)	Shirow Miwa/Maque	4:08
11.	"Hinekuremono" (ひねくれ者 The Rebel)	Huke	4:14
12.	"Mata Ne" (またね See You Soon)	no illustration	0:42
Total length:			48:34

=== DVD ===
Independent release
No.	Title	Length
1.	"Koi wa Sensō" (恋は戦争)	3:58
2.	"The World Is Mine" (ワールドイズマイン Wārudo Izu Main)	4:13
3.	"The World Is Mine (subtitled)" (ワールドイズマイン（字幕入り） Wārudo Izu Main (jimaku iri))	4:13
4.	"Black Rock Shooter" (ブラック★ロックシューター Burakku Rokku Shūtā)	4:53
5.	"Black Rock Shooter (subtitled)" (ブラック★ロックシューター（字幕入り） Burakku Rokku Shūtā (jimaku iri))	4:53
6.	"Koi wa Sensō Rough Sketch Slide Show" (恋は戦争 ラフスケッチスライドショウ Koi wa Sensō Rafu Sukecchi Suraido Shō)	3:58

Major release
No.	Title	Length
1.	"Koi wa Sensō" (恋は戦争)	3:58
2.	"Koi wa Sensō (subtitled)" (恋は戦争（字幕入り） Koi wa Sensō (jimaku iri))	3:58
3.	"The World Is Mine" (ワールドイズマイン Wārudo Izu Main)	4:13
4.	"The World Is Mine (subtitled)" (ワールドイズマイン（字幕入り） Wārudo Izu Main (jimaku iri))	4:13
5.	"Black Rock Shooter" (ブラック★ロックシューター Burakku Rokku Shūtā)	4:53
6.	"Black Rock Shooter (subtitled)" (ブラック★ロックシューター（字幕入り） Burakku Rokku Shūtā (jimaku iri))	4:53
7.	"Koi wa Sensō Rough Sketch Slide Show" (恋は戦争 ラフスケッチスライドショウ Koi wa Sensō Rafu Sukecchi Suraido Shō)	3:58
8.	"Melt" (メルト Meruto)	4:17
9.	"Melt (subtitled)" (メルト（字幕入り） Meruto (jimaku iri))	4:17

== Personnel ==
Supercell

- Ryo – writer
- Shirow Miwa – cover illustration, illustrations
- Huke – cover & label artwork, illustrations
- Redjuice – illustrations
- Suga – illustrations
- Maque – cover background, illustrations
- Yoshiki Usa – package design
- Hei8ro – photography
- 119^{[A]} – illustrations

Additional musicians

- Okiya Okoshi – guitar
- Miruku "Hime" Kokumaro – bass

Production

- Kazumitsu Shimizu – producer
- Toyohiko Arimoto – executive producer
- Yu Tamura – executive producer
- Keiji Kondo – mixer
- Yasuo Matsumoto – mixer
- Okuda Supa – mixer
- Hidekazu Sakai – mastering
- Yukiko Takata – products coordination
- Takayasu Kuroda – director, artist management
- Yoshiaki Fukuda – products management

== Notes ==
- ^{A} By the major release of Supercell, the illustrator 119 was no longer a member of Supercell.
