= Shirow Miwa =

Japanese manga artist and illustrator (born 1978)

Shirow Miwa 三輪士郎
- Born: November 9, 1978 (age 48) Toyama, Toyama, Japan
- Areas: Character design, Writer, Manga artist
- Pseudonym: Ikura Moto
- Notable works: Dogs

Shirow Miwa (三輪士郎, Miwa Shirō; born November 9, 1978) is a Japanese manga artist and illustrator. He is best known as the writer and artist for the Dogs manga series, but has also contributed illustrations to various tribute books, and magazines, including Square Enix's Monthly Shōnen Gangan. Miwa sometimes publishes under the circle name of m.m.m. + Gee. He is also an official member of Doujin Band Supercell as Illustrator and Designer. Miwa also worked on the character designs for most games in the 7th Dragon series and Soul Hackers 2.

== Works ==
Shirow's debut manga, Black Mind, a short series created in collaboration with Darai Kusanagi, was serialized in Ultra Jump in 1999, and was followed by his first solo series, Dogs, which was serialized from 2000 to 2001. The sequel, Dogs: Bullets & Carnage, began serialization in 2005. In August 2008, the Dogs prequel and sequel were announced to have been licensed by Viz Media; Dogs was subsequently released in April 2009 as Dogs, Volume 0: Prelude using the Bullets & Carnage logo. In 2009, Dogs was adapted into a 4 episode OVA series by David Production. Shirow also made the character designs for the anime Joker Game and Kiznaiver in 2016. He has also worked with Rooster Teeth to make a novel for their animated series RWBY, which was published on May 19, 2017.

=== Publications ===
- Black Mind
- Devil May Cry light novel
- Dogs
- Dogs: Bullets & Carnage
- RWBY

=== Anime ===
- Kiznaiver (character designer)
- Joker Game (character designer)

=== Video games ===
- 7th Dragon 2020, 7th Dragon 2020-II, 7th Dragon III Code: VFD (artist and character designer)
- Soul Hackers 2 (character designer)
- Fate/Grand Order (artist)
