= Satomi Arai =

Japanese voice actress

- 新井 里美
- Born: July 4, 1980 (age 46); Saitama Prefecture, Japan
- Occupation: Voice actress
- Years active: 2001–present
- Notable work: A Certain Magical Index/A Certain Scientific Railgun as Kuroko Shirai; Fairy Tail as Bisca Connell; Seitokai Yakuindomo as Ranko Hata; Re:Zero − Starting Life in Another World as Beatrice
- Spouse: Yoshimitsu Shimoyama (m. 2008)
- Children: 1
- Website: arai-satomi.com

Satomi Arai (新井 里美, Arai Satomi; born July 4, 1980) is a Japanese voice actress. She married Yoshimitsu Shimoyama in 2008 and had a son in 2010. Her husband's identity was later disclosed in 2016.

== Filmography ==
=== Anime series ===
List of voice performances in anime TV series
Year	Title	Role	Notes	Source
2002	Digimon Frontier	second Trailmon (Mole)	ep. 18	
2004	Mermaid Melody Pichi Pichi Pitch	Coco	eps. 50–52	
2004	Mermaid Melody Pichi Pichi Pitch Pure	Coco		
2004	Fafner in the Azure	Sakura Kaname		
2004	Viewtiful Joe (season 1)	Cherry Blossom	also voiced Mary (ep. 15)	
2005	Starship Operators	Yukino Nanase		
2005	Mahoraba ~Heartful Days~	Kozue Aoba	also voiced Chiyuri Midorikawa, Nanako Kanazawa, Natsume Konno, and Saki Akasaka	
2005	Loveless	Natsume's mother	also voiced a female student (eps. 1–2, 4)	
2005	Lupin III: An Angel's Tactics – Fragments of a Dream Are the Scent of Murder	Bomber Linda	TV special	
2005	Pokémon: Advanced Battle (Note: Known in Japan as Pocket Monsters: Advanced Generation.)	Tsuguyo	ep. 145	
2005	Shakugan no Shana	Rinko	ep. 1	
2005	Trinity Blood	Jinny	ep. 21	
2005	Hell Girl	Junko Kanno	ep. 4	
2006	Tactical Roar	Mashū Akoya		
2006	Ray the Animation	Masami		
2006	The Familiar of Zero	Verdande	also voiced Bugbear (ep. 4), Fureimu (eps. 1–2), Kōmori (ep. 7), and Robin (ep. 9)	
2006	Coyote Ragtime Show	March	also voiced September (eps. 1, 3)	
2006	La Corda d'Oro ~Primo Passo~	Mio Takatō		
2006	Code Geass: Lelouch of the Rebellion	Sayoko Shinozaki	also voiced an announcer (eps. 1, 4, 7) and a reporter (ep. 8)	
2007	Nodame Cantabile	Saya Suganuma	eps. 2, 11–12	
2007	Tokyo Majin Gakuen: Kenpuchō Tō	Komaki Sakurai		
2007	Gintama (season 1)	Waki Kaoru	eps. 44, 48, 97	
2007	Heroic Age	Bee	also voiced Semele (ep. 12)	
2007	Blue Dragon	Innkeeper's shadow		
2007	The Familiar of Zero: Knight of the Twin Moons	Motsognir	eps. 1, 5	
2007	Tokyo Majin Gakuen: Kenpuchō Tō Dainimaku	Komaki Sakurai		
2007	Pokémon: Diamond and Pearl (Note: Aired in Japan as Pocket Monsters Diamond & Pearl.)	Mira	ep. 47	
2007	Shakugan no Shana Second	Giant Kewpie	ep. 8	
2008	Shugo Chara!	Snoppe	eps. 14–15	
2008	Shigofumi: Letters from the Departed	Nanae Yotsugi	ep. 4	
2008	To Love Ru	Peke		
2008	Net Ghost PiPoPa	Pot		
2008	Glass Maiden	Manami		
2008	Code Geass: Lelouch of the Rebellion R2	Sayoko Shinozaki	also voiced Nonette Enneagram (eps. 2, 21)	
2008	CHIKO, Heiress of the Phantom Thief	Tome		
2008	The Familiar of Zero: Rondo of Princesses	Sylphid	eps. 8–9, 12; also voiced Motsognir (ep. 7) and Verdande (ep. 5)	
2008	A Certain Magical Index (season 1)	Kuroko Shirai		
2009	La Corda d'Oro ~Secondo Passo~	Mio Takatō	TV special	
2009	Taishō Baseball Girls	Anna Curtland		
2009	Hanasakeru Seishōnen	Najayra		
2009	A Certain Scientific Railgun	Kuroko Shirai		
2009	Fairy Tail season 1	Bisca Mulan		
2010	Mayoi Neko Overrun!	Suzuki		
2010	Okami-san & her Seven Companions	Narrator		
2010	Seitokai Yakuindomo	Ranko Hata		
2010	Nura: Rise of the Yokai Clan (season 1)	Nattō Kozō		
2010	Motto To Love Ru	Peke		
2010	A Certain Magical Index II	Kuroko Shirai		
2011	Is This a Zombie?	Jellyfish Megalo	ep. 7	
2011	Fairy Tail season 2	Bisca Mulan	ep. 71	
2011	Fairy Tail season 3	Bisca Mulan		
2011	Sket Dance	Ge-chan	eps. 11–13	
2011	Nura: Rise of the Yokai Clan - Demon Capital	Nattō Kozō		
2011	Nekogami Yaoyorozu	Ama no Kura no Moriakari no Hime		
2011	Hanasaku Iroha	Kayoko Oshimizu	ep. 18	
2011	Beyblade: Metal Fury (Note: Known in Japan as Metal Fight Beyblade 4D.)	Tithi		
2011	Shakugan no Shana Final	Rinko	ep. 3	
2012	Kill Me Baby	Et Cetera Girl		
2012	Fairy Tail season 4	Bisca Mulan	eps. 118, 123–125	
2012	Nyarko-san: Another Crawling Chaos	Shantak-kun	also voiced Isuka (eps. 9–10)	
2012	Fairy Tail season 5	Bisca Connell	also voiced Asuka Connell (eps. 128, 138, 140)	
2012	Saki Achiga-hen episode of Side-A	Kirame Hanada		
2012	Humanity Has Declined	Fairy		
2012	To Love Ru Darkness	Peke	eps. 1, 7, 11	
2012	Fairy Tail season 6	Asuka Connell, Bisca Connell, Bisca Mulan		
2012	Ixion Saga DT	Gabriella	ep. 4	
2012	The Pet Girl of Sakurasou	Akiko Kanda	eps. 7, 15	
2013	Problem Children Are Coming from Another World, Aren't They?	Shiroyasha		
2013	Nyarko-san: Another Crawling Chaos W	Shantak-kun		
2013	A Certain Scientific Railgun S	Kuroko Shirai		
2014	Seitokai Yakuindomo*	Ranko Hata		
2014	Saki: The Nationals	Kirame Hanada	ep. 3	
2014	Knights of Sidonia	Lala Hiyama		
2014	Fairy Tail season 7	Asuka Connell, Bisca Connell	also voiced Nōra (ep. 234)	
2014	Mekakucity Actors	Azami		
2014	selector infected WIXOSS	Eldora	ep. 6	
2014	Magica Wars	Mosuke		
2014	Argevollen	Liz Roderick		
2014	selector spread WIXOSS	Eldora		
2015	Fafner in the Azure: Exodus (season 1)	Sakura Kaname		
2015	Knights of Sidonia: Battle for Planet Nine	Lala Hiyama		
2015	Magical Girl Lyrical Nanoha ViVid	Els Tasmin	eps. 9, 12	
2015	To Love Ru Darkness 2nd	Peke		
2015	Shimoneta	Otome Saotome		
2015	Fafner in the Azure: Exodus (season 2)	Sakura Kaname		
2015	YuruYuri San☆Hai!	Hatsumi Kitamiya	eps. 1, 11	
2016	Witchy PreCure!	Magic Crystal		
2016	Heavy Object	Wydine Uptown	eps. 21–22, 24	
2016	Re:Zero − Starting Life in Another World (season 1)	Beatrice		
2016	Active Raid (season 2)	Abigail Martinez	eps. 13, 17	
2016	Tales of Zestiria the X (season 1)	Seres	eps. 6–7	
2016	Food Wars! Shokugeki no Soma	Lucie Hugo	eps. 12–13	
2016	Magical Girl Raising Project	Magicaloid 44	eps. 3, 5–6; also voiced Makoto Andō (ep. 6)	
2016	ViVid Strike!	Els Tasmin		
2017	Monster Hunter Stories: Ride On	Fifi		
2017	Anonymous Noise	Tsukika Kuze		
2017	Magical Circle Guru Guru	Piccia	eps. 18–19, 24	
2017	Food Wars! Shokugeki no Soma (season 3) – Part 1	Lucie Hugo	eps. 11–12	
2018	Overlord (season 2)	Pestonya Shortcake Wanko	eps. 1, 13	
2018	Dragon Pilot: Hisone and Masotan	Liliko Kinutsugai		
2018	High Score Girl	Namie Yaguchi		
2018	A Certain Magical Index III	Kuroko Shirai		
2018	Fairy Tail season 9	Asuka Connell, Bisca Connell		
2018	Hug! Pretty Cure	Bicine		
2019	Isekai Quartet	Beatrice		
2019	Do You Love Your Mom and Her Two-Hit Multi-Target Attacks?	Masumi Shirase		
2019	High Score Girl II	Namie Yaguchi		
2019	Welcome to Demon School! Iruma-kun (season 1)	Stolas Suzy		
2020	Hatena Illusion	Mariah Grene		
2020	A Certain Scientific Railgun T	Kuroko Shirai		
2020	Isekai Quartet (season 2)	Beatrice	eps. 1–3	
2020	Bofuri	Kanade	also voiced a teacher (ep. 6)	
2020	Re:Zero − Starting Life in Another World (season 2) – Part 1	Beatrice		
2021	Re:Zero − Starting Life in Another World (season 2) – Part 2	Beatrice		
2021	Ex-Arm	Kaori Munakata		
2021	Seven Knights Revolution: Hero Successor	Rachel		
2021	The World Ends with You the Animation	Uzuki Yashiro		
2021	The Fruit of Evolution	Hitsuji-san		
2022	She Professed Herself Pupil of the Wise Man	Lilly	Episode 6	
2022	Birdie Wing: Golf Girls' Story	Kuyou Iseshiba		
2023	Ayakashi Triangle	Ponosuke Ninokuru		
2024	Chillin' in Another World with Level 2 Super Cheat Powers	Phufun		
2024	Dungeon People	Binky	eps. 4, 10, 12	
2024	Quality Assurance in Another World	Akane		
2025	9-Nine: Ruler's Crown	Sophitia		
2026	Sgt. Frog☆	Narrator		

=== Original video animation ===
List of voice performances in OVA
Year	Title	Role	Notes	Source
2008	Case Closed: High School Girl Detective Sonoko Suzuki's Case Files	Eiko Nishizaki		
2009	To Love Ru	Peke	eps. 1–2, 6	
2010	A Certain Scientific Railgun: Being a Photo Shoot Model Under the Sun Isn't Easy, You Know.	Kuroko Shirai	bundled with Toaru Kagaku no Railgun Official Visual Book	
2010	A Certain Scientific Railgun: Since Misaka-san is the Center of Attention Right Now...	Kuroko Shirai		
2010	Yuri Seijin Naoko-san	Naoko-san	bundled with the third volume of Yuri Seijin Naoko-san manga series	
2011	Fairy Tail	Bisca Mulan	eps. 1–3; also voiced Bisca Connell (ep. 5)	
2011	Seitokai Yakuindomo OAD	Ranko Hata	eps. 14, 15, 17, 18, and 21 of Seitokai Yakuindomo anime TV series	
2012	Yuri Seijin Naoko-san	Naoko-san		
2012	Seitokai Yakuindomo OVA	Ranko Hata	eps. 16, 19, and 20 of Seitokai Yakuindomo anime TV series	
2012	Corpse Party: Missing Footage	Seiko Shinohara		
2012	To Love Ru Darkness	Peke		
2012	This Boy Caught a Merman	Shima's mother	also voiced over the phone	
2012	Nura: Rise of the Yokai Clan	Nattō Kōzō		
2013	Corpse Party: Tortured Souls	Seiko Shinohara	eps. 1, 4	
2014	A Certain Scientific Railgun S: All the Important Things I Learned in a Bathhouse	Kuroko Shirai	bundled with A Certain Scientific Railgun S Official Visual Book	
2014	Seitokai Yakuindomo* OAD	Ranko Hata	ep. 14, 16, 17, 18, 19, 22, 23, and 24 of Seitokai Yakuindomo* anime TV series	
2014	Seitokai Yakuindomo* OVA	Ranko Hata	ep. 15 of Seitokai Yakuindomo* anime TV series	
2015	Mobile Suit Gundam: The Origin	Haro		
2015	Nyarko-san: Another Crawling Chaos F	Shantak-kun		
2017	To Love Ru: Multiplication ~From the Front and From Behind~	Peke	bundled with To Love-Ru -Trouble- Series 10-Shūnen Anniversary Book Trouble Chronicle	
2018	Re:Zero − Starting Life in Another World: Memory Snow	Beatrice		
2019	Hi Score Girl: Extra Stage	Namie Yaguchi		

=== Original net animation ===
List of voice performances in ONA
Year	Title	Role	Notes	Source
2016	Zonmi-chan: Meat Pie of the Dead	Necro		
2016	Gijinka de Manabo!	IP (Internet Protocol)		
2017	Recovery of an MMO Junkie	Narration	ep. 8	
2018	Isekai Izakaya: Japanese Food from Another World	Korona	ep. 13; also voiced Eva's younger brother (ep. 11)	
2020	The House Spirit Tatami-chan	Ōya		
2021	The Way of the Househusband	Housewife A	ep. 2; also voiced a housewife (ep. 5)	

=== Anime films ===
List of voice performances in anime films
Year	Title	Role	Notes	Source
2005	Mobile Suit Zeta Gundam: A New Translation – Heirs to the Stars	Fa Yuiry	part of Mobile Suit Zeta Gundam: A New Translation film trilogy	
2005	Mobile Suit Zeta Gundam: A New Translation II – Lovers	Cheimin Noa, Fa Yuiry	part of Mobile Suit Zeta Gundam: A New Translation film trilogy	
2006	Mobile Suit Zeta Gundam: A New Translation III – Love Is the Pulse of the Stars	Fa Yuiry	part of Mobile Suit Zeta Gundam: A New Translation film trilogy	
2007	Shakugan no Shana	Rinko	eps. 1–3 recap and eps. 4–6 alternate version of Shakugan no Shana (season 1)	
2010	Fafner in the Azure: Heaven and Earth	Sakura Kaname		
2012	Fairy Tail the Movie: Phoenix Priestess	Bisca Connell		
2013	A Certain Magical Index: The Movie – The Miracle of Endymion	Kuroko Shirai		
2015	Knights of Sidonia	Lala Hiyama	recap of Knights of Sidonia (season 1)	
2016	selector destructed WIXOSS	Eldora		
2016	Pop in Q	Rupy		
2017	Seitokai Yakuindomo: The Movie	Ranko Hata		
2017	Code Geass: Lelouch of the Rebellion I – Initiation	Sayoko Shinozaki	part of Code Geass: Lelouch of the Rebellion film trilogy	
2018	Code Geass: Lelouch of the Rebellion II – Transgression	Sayoko Shinozaki	part of Code Geass: Lelouch of the Rebellion film trilogy	
2018	Code Geass: Lelouch of the Rebellion III – Glorification	Sayoko Shinozaki	part of Code Geass: Lelouch of the Rebellion film trilogy	
2019	Code Geass: Lelouch of the Re;surrection	Sayoko Shinozaki		
2021	Seitokai Yakuindomo: The Movie 2	Ranko Hata		
2021	Knights of Sidonia: Ai Tsumugu Hoshi	Lala Hiyama		
2022	Mobile Suit Gundam: Cucuruz Doan's Island	Mirai Yashima		
2026	Mobile Suit Gundam: Hathaway – The Sorcery of Nymph Circe	Mirai Noa		

=== Tokusatsu ===
List of voice performances in tokusatsu
Year	Title	Role	Notes	Source
2018	Kaitou Sentai Lupinranger VS Keisatsu Sentai Patranger	Naiyo Kapaja	ep. 13	

=== Video games ===
List of voice performances in video games
Year	Title	Role	Platform	Source
2004	The Legend of Heroes: Trails in the Sky	Dorothy Hyatt	PlayStation 3, PlayStation Portable, PlayStation Vita, Microsoft Windows	
2005	Crash Tag Team Racing	Coco Bandicoot	GameCube, PlayStation 2, PlayStation Portable, Xbox	
2007	The World Ends with You (Note: Known in Japan as It's a Wonderful World.)	Uzuki Yashiro	Nintendo DS, Nintendo Switch, Android, iOS	
2008	Tales of Vesperia	Gauche	Nintendo Switch, PlayStation 3, PlayStation 4, Xbox 360, Xbox One, Microsoft Windows	
2010	Corpse Party Blood Covered: ... Repeated Fear	Seiko Shinohara	PlayStation Portable, iOS	
2011	Toaru Majutsu no Index	Kuroko Shirai	PlayStation Portable	
2011	Moe Moe Daisensou☆Gendaibaan	Aoi	Microsoft Windows	
2011	Corpse Party: Book of Shadows	Seiko Shinohara	PlayStation Portable, Microsoft Windows, iOS	
2011	Moe Moe Daisensou☆Gendaibaan +	Aoi	PlayStation Portable	
2011	Toaru Kagaku no Railgun	Kuroko Shirai	PlayStation Portable	
2011	Moe Moe Daisensou☆Gendaibaan 3D	Aoi	Nintendo 3DS	
2012	Moe Moe Daisensou☆Gendaibaan ++	Aoi	PlayStation 3	
2012	Moe Moe Daisensou☆Gendaibaan ++	Aoi	PlayStation Vita	
2012	Corpse Party: Sweet Sachiko's Hysteric Birthday Bash	Seiko Shinohara	PlayStation Portable, Microsoft Windows	
2012	Bravely Default	Mephilia Venus	Nintendo 3DS	
2014	Corpse Party: Blood Drive	Seiko Shinohara	Nintendo Switch, PlayStation Vita, PC, Android, iOS	
2014	Omega Quintet	Ayumi	PlayStation 4, Microsoft Windows	
2015	Bravely Second: End Layer	Mephilia Venus	Nintendo 3DS	
2015	The Legend of Heroes: Trails in the Sky FC Evolution	Dorothy Hyatt	PlayStation Vita	
2016	Tales of Berseria	Seres	PlayStation 3, PlayStation 4, Microsoft Windows	
2016	Touhou Kobuto V: Burst Battle	Remilia Scarlet	Nintendo Switch, PlayStation 4, PlayStation Vita, Microsoft Windows	
2018	Fire Emblem Heroes	Loki	Android, iOS	
2019	A Certain Magical Index: Imaginary Fest	Kuroko Shirai	Android, iOS	
2019	Astral Chronicles (Law of Creation II)	Kalypso	Android, iOS	
2020	Illusion Connect	Hachi Shiki	Android, iOS	
2020	The King of Fighters All Star	Rachel	Android, iOS	
2021	Neo: The World Ends with You	Uzuki Yashiro	Nintendo Switch, PlayStation 4, Microsoft Windows	
2021	Cookie Run: Kingdom	Carrot Cookie	Android, iOS	
2022	Fate/Grand Order	Don Quixote (Sancho)	Android, iOS	
2022	Goddess of Victory: Nikke	Syuen	Android, iOS	
2022	Dragon Quest Treasures	Purrsula	Nintendo Switch	
2023	Octopath Traveler II	Dolcinaea	Nintendo Switch, PlayStation 4, PlayStation 5, Microsoft Windows	
2023	Blue Archive	Meru Himeki	Android, iOS	
2023	Zenless Zone Zero	Alexandrina Sebastiane	Microsoft Windows, Android, iOS, PlayStation 5	
2025	Trickcal: Chibi Go	Vivi	Android, iOS	
2026	Magical Princess	Mary	Microsoft Windows	

=== Dubbing ===
==== Live-action TV series ====
List of performances in live-action TV series
Year	Title	Role	Original performer	Source
2001	Caitlin's Way	Caitlin Seeger	Lindsay Felton	
2002	The West Wing	Zoey Bartlet	Elisabeth Moss	
2003	Chicago Hope (season 4)	Jessica Walters	Brittany Alyse Smith	
2003	All That	Christina Kirkman		
2005	The Suite Life of Zack & Cody	London Tipton	Brenda Song	
2008	The Suite Life on Deck	London Tipton	Brenda Song	

==== Live-action films ====
List of performances in live-action films
Year	Title	Role	Original performer	Source
	Animal House	Shelly Dubinsky	Lisa Baur	
	That Darn Cat	Patti Randall	Christina Ricci	
2004	Catch That Kid	Madeline "Maddy" Rose Phillips	Kristen Stewart	
2006	The Pink Panther	Cherie	Kristin Chenoweth	
2009	The Butterfly Effect 3: Revelations	Vicky	Melissa Jones	
2010	Blizzard	Zoe Warner	Katie Andrews	
2011	Final Destination 5	Candice Hooper	Ellen Wroe	

==== Animated series ====
List of performances in animated TV series
Year	Title	Role	Source
2004	Kim Possible	Joss Possible	
2004	Hi Hi Puffy AmiYumi	Harmony	
2005	Sabrina: The Animated Series	Gem Stone	
2008	Chowder	Panini	
2022	Oni: Thunder God's Tale	Kappa	
