= Yoshimitsu Shimoyama =

Japanese voice actor (born 1976)

- 下山 吉光
- Born: May 6, 1976 (age 50); Yokohama, Kanagawa Prefecture, Japan
- Occupation: Voice actor
- Years active: 1997–present
- Spouse: Satomi Arai (m. 2008)
- Children: 1
- Website: y-shimoyama.com

Yoshimitsu Shimoyama (下山 吉光, Shimoyama Yoshimitsu; born May 6, 1976) is a Japanese voice actor. He married Satomi Arai in 2008 and had a son in 2010. He revealed his marital status in 2016.

== Filmography ==
=== Anime films ===
- Yo-kai Watch Shadowside: Oni-ō no Fukkatsu (2017) as the Onimaro Leader

=== Anime series ===
- Rockman EXE (2002–2003) as GutsMan
- Naruto (2002–2009) as Inabi Uchiha, Tobio's Father
- Hamtaro (2003) as Dukusuke the owl
- Rockman EXE Axess (2003–2004) as GutsMan and GravityMan
- Rockman EXE Stream (2004–2005) as GutsMan and GravityMan
- Rockman EXE Beast (2005–2006) as GutsMan
- Rockman EXE Beast+ (2006) as GutsMan
- Gintama (2006-2018) as shop owner, Muu-san, Arsonist, others.
- Tokyo Majin (2007) as Tsutsumidoori
- Black Butler (2009) as Harold West (eps 14–15)
- Fairy Tail (2009–2019) as Alzack Connell, Cancer, Earthland Sugarboy, Obra, Sugarboy, Semmes, Bora, Warcry, Kurohebi, Motherglare
- Bakuman (2011–2013) as Naoto Ogawa
- Mobile Suit Gundam-san (2014) as Kai-san
- Legend of the Galactic Heroes (2018) as the narrator
- Dragon Pilot: Hisone and Masotan (2018) as Iboshi
- Star Twinkle PreCure (2019) as Notrei and Notrigger
- Vinland Saga (2019) as Halfdan
- True Cooking Master Boy (2019–2021) as Zhou Yu
- In/Spectre (2020) as Kappa, Ochimusha, Ushi no Ayakashi
- Ranking of Kings (2021) as Desha
- Shenmue (2022) as Chai
- Metallic Rouge (2024) as Roy Yunghart
- Sgt. Frog☆ (2026) as Paul Moriyama

=== Original video animation ===
- Utawarerumono (2009) as Mukkuru

=== Original net animation ===
- Star Wars: Visions – The Village Bride (2021) as Izuma

=== Tokusatsu ===
- Tokusou Sentai Dekaranger (2004) as Beesian Beeling (ep. 26)
- Juken Sentai Gekiranger (2007) as Five Venom Fist Confrontation Beast Centipede-Fist Kademu (ep. 4 - 5)
- Kamen Rider Kiva (2008) as Tortoise Fangire (ep. 32 - 33)
- Samurai Sentai Shinkenger (2009) as Ayakashi Hachouchin (ep. 14)
- Kamen Rider × Kamen Rider OOO & W Featuring Skull: Movie War Core (2010) as Pteranodon Yummy (Male)
- Kaizoku Sentai Gokaiger (2011) as Sugormin
- Shin Godzilla (2016)

=== Video games ===
- Mega Man Network Transmission (2003) as GutsMan and GravityMan
- Fairy Tail: Gekitou! Madoushi Kessen (2010) as Lullaby
- Black Rock Shooter: The Game (2011) as Kali
- Fighting EX Layer (2018) as Cracker Jack
- Fairy Tail (2020) as Motherglare
- Fairy Tail: Guild Masters (2021) as Bora

=== Dubbing ===
==== Live-action ====
- Power Rangers Turbo as Blue Senturion
- Power Rangers in Space as Blue Senturion, Gold Ranger
- Red Dawn as Robert Kitner (Josh Hutcherson)
- Roboshark as Bill Glates
- Tekken as Marshall Law

==== Animation ====
- Rango as Jedidiah
- Uncle Grandpa as Belly Bag
