= List of La Corda d'Oro episodes =

Cover of the first English subtitled DVD compilation released by Sentai Filmworks.

The episodes from the anime La Corda d'Oro are based on the manga of the same name written and illustrated by Yuki Kure, that is itself an adaptation of a video game with designs done by Kure. The series is produced by Ruby Party (a division of Koei), animated by Yumeta Company, and directed by Kōjin Ochi. The story is about a high school girl, Kahoko, who is given a magic violin by a musical fairy and must take part in an elite music competition surrounded by attractive men, but at the same time it's about her love for the violin and none of the men.

The series is made of two seasons. The first, entitled La Corda d'Oro: Primo Passo, aired on Japanese television from October 2, 2006, to March 26, 2007. The 25 TV episode and one OVA were compiled into 9 DVD volumes. The second season has only two episodes, the first of which aired on March 26, 2009, and the second on June 5, 2009. Both seasons are available for streaming on Crunchyroll and the first has been licensed by Sentai Filmworks.

Two pieces of theme music were used for the first season of the anime; The opening theme was "Brand New Breeze", performed by Kanon, and the ending theme was "Crescendo", performed by Stella Quintet. The second season has only an ending theme: 蒼穹のスコア ～The score in blue～ by Stella Quintet.

== ~Primo Passo~ ==
No.	Title	Original Air Date	English Air Date
1	"An Impossible Prelude"; Transliteration: "Arienai Pureryūdo" (Japanese: ありえないプレリュード)	October 1, 2006	August 18, 2010
Episode one introduces the main characters, Lili and Kahoko Hino, and the Seiso Academy setting. Lili is a fairy involved with the school's music contest, the Intramural concours; Hino is a student who is chosen to enter the competition by Lili, despite not being a music student, because she is able to see Lili. Lili presents Hino with a magic violin, which can be played by any true lover of music. Another character introduced is Shoko Fuyuumi, a first year student who is bullied by other music students because she was entered into the concours. When Hino defends Fuyuumi, the music students challenge Hino to play, and she agrees to play before the concours in one week's time. Also introduced is Ryotaro Tsuchiura, when he accidentally bumps into her and she nearly falls off the stairs, but he catches her just in time.
2	"The Future Troubles of Gavotte"; Transliteration: "Zentotanan na Gavotto" (Japanese: 前途多難なガヴォット)	October 8, 2006	August 19, 2010
Episode two introduces Len Tsukimori, a highly talented but very conceited second year music student. He is disdainful towards Hino and her friend Tsuchiura, a member of the Soccer Club, when they meet. Despite this, when she hears Tsukimori practicing the violin, she is greatly moved and gives him great praise, which he haughtily dismisses. After hearing him play, Hino is able to recall the feelings and with the magic violin, she is able to play the piece, which Lili tells her is Schubert's Ave Maria. Hino also meets the friendly, outgoing third-year music student, Kazuki Hihara, on the rooftop. Hihara tries playing Gavotte, Hino's practice piece, on his trumpet, but Hino is puzzled that the melody sounds different from when she plays it.
3	"The Anonymous Chopin"; Transliteration: "Tokumei Kibō no Shopan" (Japanese: 匿名希望のショパン)	October 15, 2006	August 20, 2010
Hino decides to help Lili and to practice hard. Hino rescues Tsukimori from being cornered by two other music students by splashing them with water from a vase; however, the vase breaks and cuts her fingers. Tsukimori shows concern, though ostensibly because this will affect the overall performance of the concours, and not on Hino's behalf. Later Tsukimori and Tsuchiura get into an altercation over Hino and music. Tsukimori informs Tsuchiura disdainfully that general education students have no right to say anything about music. Afterwards, Hino was informed that she needs an accompanist for the first selection. Then, Hino discovers Tsuchiura playing the piano beautifully in a music shop. When Tsuchiura notices Hino, he becomes upset and makes Hino promise not to tell anybody about it. Hino seeks a piano accompanist, which proves difficult because she is a general education student. She is wary of an offer by Azuma Yunoki to find her an accompanist. Eventually another girl offers to accompany her and she accepts.
4	"The Waltz of the Bewildered Heart"; Transliteration: "Mayoi Kokoro no Warutsu" (Japanese: 迷い心のワルツ)	October 22, 2006	TBA
Hino visits the shop after practice, where the manager offers to show her a video recording of a young prodigy, who turns out to be Tsuchiura. She is amazed at his piano playing, and is overwhelmed with emotion, which makes her cry. She laments that as a violinist, she cannot play Chopin's pieces. The manager manages to find the score, Chopin's Allegro, for the violin. She makes up her mind to play this in the concours. Later, Hino encounters Tsuchiura, and on her request, he plays for her. When she tells him about the video she saw, her feelings about his playing, and her regret that he no longer plays the piano in public, Tsuchiura becomes upset and leaves but then regrets it.
5	"The Barefooted Vibrato"; Transliteration: "Hadashi no Viburāto" (Japanese: 裸足のヴィブラート)	October 29, 2006	TBA
On the day of the first selection, Hino turns up dressed informally through her ignorance. Thankfully, Lili shows up in her dressing room and uses magic to provide her with a selection of dresses. At one point, Hihara enters without knocking and sees her wearing a nun's habit. However, Lili quickly switches her back to the school uniform and Hino attempts to pass it off as "seeing things". A teacher then directs Hihara away from the girls' dressing room. Hino and Lili eventually choose a knee-length white dress. During the performance, Hino's accompanist ducks out, criticizing Hino's lack of commitment to music practice. Tsukimori arrives at the scene and defends Hino, and her accompanist runs away crying. Hino goes on without accompaniment, and to keep herself from running away and eliminate the pain of the shoe sore she got from running in her heels, she slips out of them and takes the stage in her bare feet as part of that resolve, surprising her friends in the audience; after a few notes, she is asked to leave the stage because all participants are required to have an accompaniment. Tsuchiura steps forward from the audience and takes the place of Hino's accompanist. Tsuchiura tells Hino to forget their arguments, and the two take the stage. Hino plays Chopin's Tristesse, or "song of parting" but she feels that it is not an ending, but a beginning, during the performance; Tsuchiura admires Hino and her way of performing. Everybody, even the judges, remarks on how joyful and vibrant the piece sounds when Hino plays it. The concourse members, too, are overcome with emotion. Then Tsukimori goes on and gives a powerful performance. In the end, Hino comes last in the selection and Tsukimori comes first.
6	"The Uneasy Polka"; Transliteration: "Munasawagi no Poruka" (Japanese: 胸騒ぎのポルカ)	November 5, 2006	TBA
After the first selection, Tsuchiura is added to the participants for the concours. All seven participants including Kanazawa go to Fuyuumi's family villa for four days and three nights. Hino apologizes to Tsuchiura about him being in the concours and he rubs her head and says that it's alright and she begins to blush. After a night of sharing a room with each other, Tsukimori and Tsuchiura demand that Kanazawa change their rooms. So, Tsukimori rooms with Yunoki and Tsuchiura rooms with Hihara and Shimizu. Hihara is shown for the first time as being serious in his huge crush on Hino, which comes out when he falls on her by accident. He also is shown as someone who thinks of girls as very different from guys ("smell like sunshine and butterflies" to be exact) and Tsuchiura gets irritated when that happens.
7	"The Secret Duet"; Transliteration: "Himeyaka na Dyuetto" (Japanese: 秘めやかなデュエット)	November 12, 2006	TBA
Kanazawa asks Hino to come with them shopping for food and souvenirs, leaving Tsuchiura, Hihara, Yunoki and Tsukimori at home. Kanazawa leaves a note saying that they can pre-heat the food for lunch. Unfortunately, Tsukimori burns the food, thus having Tsuchiura make lunch. After dinner, Tsukimori falls asleep. When he wakes up, he hears Hino playing and he plays a duet with her. Upon returning to school, Tsukimori is chased by school newspaper reporter Nami Amou. He stumbles upon Hino who just finished practicing her violin and covers her mouth when Amou's voice is heard just outside. After Amou passes, he releases his hand over her mouth, prompting Hino to leave. While walking away, Hino comments on how she felt Tsukimori's cold hand before and this time it was hot with a burning feeling. Realizing that Tsukimori is sick, Hino runs back to the practice room to discover Tsukimori leaning against the wall almost unconscious. As she is about to call for a doctor, Tsukimori stops her. Losing complete conscious, his head falls on her shoulder.
8	"The Heart-Spun Canon"; Transliteration: "Kokoro Tsumugu Kanon" (Japanese: こころ紡ぐカノン)	November 19, 2006	TBA
The second selection is coming close and Hino still hasn't decided what song she will play. Being stressed like she is, practicing violin every time she has the chance causes her to get into a fight with her friends. At home, Hino accidentally breaks her music box, which was a birthday present from Mio and Nao which played Pachelbel's Canon. After fixing her music box and reconciling with her friends, Hino decides to play Canon for the second selection.
9	"A Peaceful Concerto"; Transliteration: "Yasuragi no Koncheruto" (Japanese: 安らぎのコンチェルト)	November 26, 2006	TBA
Hino is having problems with her performance because she thinks that her performance is not good enough. Tsuchiura advises her to perform in a public place to build confidence. The next day, Hino goes to practice outside but Amou sees her and Fuyuumi. Amou helps the both of them to choose the clothes for the upcoming selection. On her way home, Hino meets Manami, the owner of the music shop; he tells her about a salon concert so she goes to watch it. There she meets Shimizu and they watch the concert together. Afterwards, they get to meet the performers and Hino is asked to play her violin. At Shimizu's request, Hino plays Ave Maria for them.
10	"The Aloof Virtuoso"; Transliteration: "Kokō no Virutuōso" (Japanese: 孤高のヴィルトゥオーソ)	December 3, 2006	TBA
The second selection starts. After the performances by Tsuchiura and Hino, Tsukimori goes to the waiting room to calm his nerves as he is performing last. However, when he goes to put his things away in a closet, someone knocks him out from behind and locks him inside the closet. After Hihara finishes, Hino notices that Tsukimori hasn't returned, and Yunoki suggests that Tsukimori probably went to the waiting room, but Hino doesn't see him there. After Fuyuumi's performance, Tsuchiura and Hihara join the search, but are misled by those who had locked Tsukimori in the closet. Eventually, Hino finds Tsukimori, but by the time they return to the backstage area, the audience is already leaving. After everybody has gone home, Tsukimori's mother and Hino hear him play in the auditorium.
11	"The Black and White Adagio"; Transliteration: "Shiro to Kuro no Adājo" (Japanese: 白と黒のアダージョ)	December 10, 2006	TBA
Hino begins to feel guilty about getting second place when she's not using her own talent but the magic violin's. Hihara cheers her up when he asks Hino and Yunoki to help him find a present for his older brother. After shopping for the present (a cap), they rest for a while near the harbor, where Hihara explains to the curious Hino how he and Yunoki met. After the flashback, Hihara reveals that after high school, he will be attending a university that has musicology. Yunoki, on the other hand, will abandon music to study business, which surprises Hino, who believed Yunoki will pursue music. The next day, Hino goes to the roof to practice, hoping to immerse herself with practice other than drowning in her guilt, discovers Yunoki already practicing on the roof. After exchanging pleasantries, Yunoki begins to get hostile and calls Hino annoying.
12	"The Guilty Pianissimo"; Transliteration: "Ushirometasa no Pianisshimo" (Japanese: 後ろめたさのピアニッシモ)	December 17, 2006	TBA
Yunoki continues to insult Hino, telling her to quit the concourse. The next day, Hino tries to tell her two friends about Yunoki's sudden negative personality but they interrupt her with their love for Yunoki before Hino could tell them. She encounters Amo at the stair way. As she tries to tell her about Yunoki, she hears Yunoki's voice behind her. Surprised, she slips on the stairs and falls down. During the fall, she had acquired a bruise on her knee. Yunoki takes her hand and drags her to the nurse's office. Putting up a smiling facade, Yunoki inquires Hino if she thought about what he said, about quitting the concourse. Hino hesitantly says that she'll stay in the concourse despite anything. Yunoki's facade falls off as he approaches Hino. He pushes Hino onto the bed and threatens her. Hino realizes that she has no choice but to keep Yunoki's personality to herself because no one will believe her compared to the perfect, kind student, Yunoki. She feels more dejected and guilty that she's deceiving everyone. Hino decides to skip practice and leave school when she meets up with Hihara. Hihara invites Hino and Yunoki to his orchestra. After hearing a first year try her hardest on a piece of music, she becomes filled with guilt and runs out, resulting in her meeting Shinobu Osaki. He manages to comfort Hino.
13	"The Irreplaceable Melody"; Transliteration: "Kakegaenaki Merodi" (Japanese: かけがえなきメロディ)	December 24, 2006	TBA
Hino tries to immerse herself in practice to keep from feeling that pang of guilt for placing 2nd. She's so immersed in practice that she doesn't even think about the upcoming mid term exam. Lili, seeing her neglect her studies, takes away her violin until after the mid terms. Lili tells Hino that she shouldn't ignore things like sleep to practice the violin. Hino starts to catch up on her social life. As she begins to study, she realizes how much she misses the violin. After feeling like she failed the mid term exam, she goes to the music room to receive her theme for the 3rd selection, which is the irreplaceable thing. After receiving the theme, Hino hurries to find Lili for him to return the magic violin but Lili has reason not to return it. On the way, she meets up with Tsuchira and Tsukimori as they get into an intense argument. After calming them down, Tsukimori shows a little compassion as he corrects Hino's hand position on the violin and advises that she looks in the mirror to ensure the positioning. When she arrives home, her mother sends her on an errand to deliver something to her older sister. After delivering it, she catches sight of a museum showcase on the history of stringed instruments. She meets Shimizu there. While there, Shimizu tells her a truth; that she herself did not know about her: She loves the violin. Lili returns the magic violin, proud that she finally figured it out. The next day, she gets her exam back. Her score is 53. Yunoki interrupts her despair. After teasing her and calling her names, he calls her by her first name, indicating intimacy.
14	"The Capriccio of Maiden's Mind"; Transliteration: "Otomegokoro no Kapurichio" (Japanese: 乙女心のカプリチオ)	January 7, 2007	TBA
Kazuki overhears Hino muttering about Yunoki and her and he thinks they are getting married. Actually, Yunoki told Kahoko about a fiance "candidate", Ayano, and how she was being too persistent in chasing after him. Azuma lied and told her someone else was in his heart, and asks Hino to pose as his "love". Meanwhile, Kazuki has told everyone in the concourse (except Shoko) about what he heard, and they visit the Yunoki house. Hino meets Azuma's younger sister, Miyabi, and thinks that she is a bishōjo (a beautiful girl). Ayano comes, (another bishōjo) and she immediately tells him that she doesn't mind if there were someone in his heart, she would always be ready to marry him. Miyabi says that Ayano is a 1st year in high school, and although she has a pedigree, is pretty, and studies hard, she is "terribly good at getting the wrong impression". Azuma's grandmother returns though, forcing Shimizu, Kahoko, Kazuki, Len, Miyabi, Ayano, and Ryotaro to hide. She is very strict and tells them to leave. Hino later confesses to Ayano that the relationship between her and Yunoki was a lie, but Azuma tells her that she should try other different things, as she is still beginning high school. Later, Ryotaro meets his ex-girlfriend Mizue Sakimoto. She accidentally thinks that Hino is the girlfriend of either him or Len.
15	"An Aria of the Rapidly Beating Heart"; Transliteration: "Takanaru Mune no Aria" (Japanese: 高鳴る胸のアリア)	January 14, 2007	TBA
In the conference room, for the concourse meeting, Amou and Mori talk about their impression of the male participants while Hino and Shoko just listen to them. Amou also talks about the "Violin Romance" and asks Hino, who is a violinist, who she's most interested among the male participants. None of them know that Kazuki, Ryotaro, Len and Keiichi were eavesdropping on their conversation. While Amou asks Hino which one of the five she likes the guys look waiting for her answer until Azuma comes and makes eavesdropping done for. The next day, Hino can't practice at home so she goes to the park to practice. She then sees Kazuki playing basketball with his elder brother and friends. Suddenly, his brother and other friends go home saying they have something to do. The both of them see Ryotaro with his ex-girlfriend, Sakimoto, and they join them. After, Ryotaro and Kazuki play a one-on-one basketball game. Sakimoto tells Hino about her junior high relationship with Ryotaro. When Kazuki is injured, Hino runs inside the court to aid him. Sakimoto, then, asks Ryotaro to escort her on going home. After having Hino washing his injury, Kazuki realizes that he has feelings for her.
16	"The Lying Violin"; Transliteration: "Usotsuki na Vaiorin" (Japanese: うそつきなヴァイオリン)	January 21, 2007	TBA
Osaki asks the concourse participants to help him on a violin class. Kahoko, Len, Keiichi and Kazuki helps him. After a quartet performance, the children start to practice. Kahoko seems to be guilty and jealous of not being able to play normally. After class, Hino comes back to the room to get the other violin. Alone, she tries to play and it does not sound good. Len comes in and interrogate her about the awful sound. She runs out to the swing and cries. Near in the end of the episode, Len tells Hino that he thinks that Hino's violin is the only one she can play. But then Hino replies that there is no such thing. Len says to Hino that there are many things that he doesn't understand about her.
17	"The Impatient Crescendo"; Transliteration: "Shōsō no Kuresshendo" (Japanese: 焦燥のクレッシェンド)	January 28, 2007	TBA
Hino is still affected of what Tsukimori has said. It seems that even Hihara, Tsuchiura, Tsukimori and Shimizu are also affected by Hino's troubles. Moreover, it affects their performance in the third selection. Seeing how great Tsukimori and Tsuchiura's performance level, Hino has felt that she is never going to be as good as them. She wishes strongly to the magic violin to help her have a good performance, causing the strings to snap during her performance.
18	"The Heartbreaking Partita"; Transliteration: "Shōshin no Parutīta" (Japanese: 傷心のパルティータ)	February 4, 2007	TBA
Yunoki is the one last to perform. In some way, it seems that he is also affected by what's happening because it is said that his performance was more serious than before. Nevertheless, he says that such things will not affect him. At home, his grandmother tells him that he will continue his high school education abroad. At the waiting room, Lili tries to fix the magic violin but couldn't. After the 3rd selection, Hino goes home. The next day, she lives her life before the concourse. She doesn't play anymore saying that she doesn't have the right to play and love the violin. Tsuchiura confronts her but it's no good because she says that she is going to withdraw from the concourse. Going home, he passes across the soccer club. The team captain says to him that he has to choose. If he decides to continue soccer, he must withdraw from the concourse. If not, he can't return to the soccer club anymore.
19	"Pavane of the Lost Heart"; Transliteration: "Nakushita Kokoro no Pavānu" (Japanese: 失くした心のパヴァーヌ)	February 11, 2007	TBA
Azuma tells Kanazawa that he will withdraw from the concourse because he's going to study in England. This rumor started to spread in the music department. Azuma then confronts Kahoko about this. Kazuki is also dismayed of hearing this without Azuma telling him. Like Azuma, Kahoko also tells Kanazawa that she will withdraw. The next day, Keiichi looks for her in the practice room but instead saw Len and told him that he wants to hear Kahoko's music. Len also overhears Kazuki, that Kahoko is giving-up violin. Therefore, he confronts her. He tells about his childhood memory about almost losing his ability to play the violin. He then asks her if she doesn't like playing the violin. She says she doesn't while crying then runs out.
20	"A Tear-Colored Rondo"; Transliteration: "Namida Iro no Rondo" (Japanese: 涙色のロンド)	February 18, 2007	TBA
At the beginning of the episode Hino tries to return the violin to Lili but a cat interfered. On her way home, she meets Shimizu. He plays a song for her and requests her to play one for him yet she refuses and leave while crying. She then sees Osaki and they ride a ferris wheel. He tells her about his perspective about music. The next day, Hino again brings the violin. She puts it on the ground and turns away. She then hears Tsukimori playing Ave Maria and it reminded her about experiences because of the violin. She has then decided that she doesn't want to be parted with her violin and wants to continue to play it. Lili shows up happy but tells her that even if the strings are replaced, it won't be a magical violin anymore. It will become just an ordinary one.
21	"Once More, Andante"; Transliteration: "Mō Ichido, Andante" (Japanese: もう一度、アンダンテ)	February 25, 2007	TBA
Hino asks Tsukimori how to restring violins. He takes her to a violin artisan, Mr. Nakata, out-of-town. Mr. Nakata is amazed how the violin was built but he is surprised not to see any label on the violin. After going to Mr. Nakata, they go to Manami Instruments to buy new string. They meet Tsuchiura, playing the piano, there. After picking and restringing the violin, Tsuchiura helps Hino on tuning the violin though it doesn't sound good. The next day, Hino starts to practice again. Tsuchiura finally decides to quit soccer to pursue the concourse. He then thanks Hino for helping him play in public again.
22	"A Fanfare for You"; Transliteration: "Kimi no Tame no Fanfāre" (Japanese: 君のためのファンファーレ)	March 4, 2007	TBA
Since Hino has started to play the violin without the magic, it sounds horrible. She tries her best and keeps on practicing. Moreover, it has been the talk of the school. Hihara is greatly affected of what is happening and Hino tries to cheer him up. Hihara also tells her his story about the time he quit track team to play the trumpet. Because of the intrigue about her around the school, her friends cheer her up. Hino is about to go home then she saw Yunoki's car at the gate. He takes her away by force to have his last dinner in Japan with her.
23	"Our Cadenza"; Transliteration: "Oretachi no Kadentsua" (Japanese: 俺たちのカデンツァ)	March 11, 2007	TBA
Yunoki has already left and the theme for the final selection has been decided. "Setting Free". After class, Hino returns Amou's lost negatives to her. While returning the negatives to their closet, Amou drops a box of old stuff from a shelf. The girls find a cassette tape in it which Amou plays on her tape player to hear a mysterious male opera singer. Kanazawa then rushes into the room and tells the girls to not tell anyone about the tape. At home, Tsukimori accepts his mother's offer to accompany her in a charity concert. The next day, Hino goes to Manami Instruments to buy a tuning fork and sees Tsuchiura practicing. Outside the store, Hihara and Tsukimori are there. Hihara tells that in front of the store was where he decided that he would leave track team to join the brass band. Inside the store, the storeowner shows a video of Tsukimori when he was still in elementary where he joined a concourse. This video was the one that inspired Tsuchiura to join a concourse once when he was in elementary, too. Going home, they meet Osaki with some children handing flyers to a volunteer concert. Hihara and Tsuchiura plays Entertainer to get the attention of people so that they can handout the flyers. After that, Tsuchiura walks Hino home and told her that just as Paganini inspired Liszt, her violin playing inspires him and Hino started to blush.
24	"A Heart Filling Harmony"; Transliteration: "Kokoro Mitasu Hāmonī" (Japanese: 心満たすハーモニー)	March 18, 2007	TBA
At the rooftop, Hino meets Tsukimori and gives her a ticket to the charity concert. He says he wants her to hear his music. The next day, practicing at the park, Kazuki waits for Kahoko to finish practice and they go to a cake shop. Lili says to Kahoko that she and not anyone else play the violin. Keiichi also tells her that her sheet music is in her heart. Before the concert begins, Kahoko sees Tsukimori on the seaside and tells her that her music is sincere. At the concert hall, Kahoko sees the other concourse participants. Kahoko is surprised to know that all of them got their ticket from Misa Hamai, Tsukimori's mom. She realizes that she is the only one that he invited. Tsuchiura somehow realizes that and gets a little irritated. After the concert, all of them went backstage to the waiting room to thank his mother for the wonderful concert. After the concert, Hino tells everyone that she will play a song that is more like her and says she's going to do her best. She then hugs Shoko and Kazuki is somehow jealous. Then she invites Shoko to eat cake and all the guys were fascinated to see the real Hino.
25	"The Beloved Ave Maria"; Transliteration: "Itoshi no Ave Maria" (Japanese: 愛しのアヴェ·マリア)	March 25, 2007	TBA
It's the day of the last selection and everyone is surprised to know that Yunoki has come back from England. He only went there to cancel the transfer. Hino is in the dressing room to change outfits but is interrupted by Amou and Mori with some bad news. Mori's arm is sprained. She got in a bicycle accident. Making it even worse is that Hino is supposed to be the first to perform. Having no accompanist, Shoji, her former accompanist, replaces Mori. Everyone also agrees to change the order of performance for Hino to practice with Shoji. First to perform is Yunoki. She thanks him because he is the reason that she forgave herself for deceiving everyone because he himself deceives everyone. Second, to perform is Hihara. She says that he is the first person who told her to enjoy music and he has always helped her. She will do her best performance in gratitude of his encouragement. Next is Fuyuumi. She is not as nervous as she was before when the concourse started. Next, to perform is Shimizu. He changed his cello to a baroque style to fit with his song. She thanks him because he taught her many things about music and she learned a lot from him as well. Next is Tsukimori. Hino is called to come back from practice because it's almost time for her to perform. She thanks him because he is the first person who showed her the beauty of the sound of the violin. Second to the last, Tsuchiura. He has always been worried of Hino. She says that she wouldn't have gotten this far if it wasn't of his encouragements. Lastly, she performs Ave Maria in her school uniform. She thanks the violin for it brought her to many wonderful encounters and memories. She thanks Lili because he was the one who introduced her to music. At the end of the selection, Tsuchiura, Tsukimori, Yunoki, Hihara and Shimizu plays Elgar's Salut d'Amour for Hino and are all heard saying her first name.
26	"A Summer Encore"; Transliteration: "Hito Natsu no Ankōru" (Japanese: ひと夏のアンコール)	DVD only	TBA
The principal arranged for a 3 day-2 night training camp. The theme is "The one and only tune". Hino wants to go sight seeing but doesn't know where to start so Hihara asks her to go with him to the park. They both played Gavotte there. After they play, Hino goes by herself but gets lost. Fortunately, Osaki, who's there to help a friend in a beach resort, finds her in the street. At the rest house, Yunoki tells Hino to go to the entrance hall after dinner. Yunoki shows Hino the Queen of the Night flower which only blooms once on a summer night. He plays a song just for her while the flowers bloom. It's already late at night and Hino can't sleep. She finds Kanazawa making a snack for himself and asks her to join him. Next day, they go to the beach to have some fun. Then Shimizu asks Hino if she can listen to his music. He takes her to a church and plays. After that, she goes to the aquarium where she sees Tsukimori. He was asked to help cheer up a dolphin by playing the violin. Before dinner, Tsuchiura asks Hino to accompany him. He plays a song just for her and as the room is filled with a romantic feeling, the ceiling lights up and shows the constellation. It's the last night of the camp and Amou shows up. Everyone then asks Hino to play a song for them, she then plays Elgar's Salut d'Amour, being accompanied by Fuyuumi.

== ~Secondo Passo~ ==
No.	Title	Original Air Date	English Air Date
Special	"First Movement"; Transliteration: "Daiichigakushō" (Japanese: 第一楽章)	March 26, 2009	TBA
The contest has long ended. Kahoko continues to play the violin. A mysterious student transfers into her class. The new principal decides to form an ensemble out of the participants in the contest, but excludes only Kahoko.
Special	"Second Movement"; Transliteration: "Dainigakushō" (Japanese: 第二楽章)	June 5, 2009	TBA
Kahoko struggles with her self-doubt and admits to being afraid of appearing on stage again while Kaji says that he'd long given up on playing music. Kaji faces the stage again and plays beautifully with everyone, after Hino plays her violin in Ousaki's place. To thank her Kaji kisses her hand.
