= List of Fafner in the Azure episodes =

The anime series Fafner in the Azure has 26 episodes. The opening theme is "Shangri-La", the insert theme in episode 15 is "Proof" and the ending theme is "Separation".

A two-part OVA subtitled Arcadian Memory, summarizing the series in its entirety, was released on November 2, 2005, and January 12, 2006.

A prequel television special subtitled RIGHT OF LEFT aired on December 30, 2005. The theme song is "Peace of mind" and the insert song is "Hatenaki Monologue" (果て無きモノローグ, lit. "Unending Monologue").

A sequel theatrical film subtitled HEAVEN AND EARTH premiered on December 25, 2010. It is set two years after the end of the original TV series. The theme song is "Soukyuu" (蒼穹, lit. "Azure") and the insert song is "Sayonara no Toki Kurai Hohoende" (さよならの時くらい微笑んで, lit. "Smile at the Time of Goodbye").

A sequel TV series subtitled EXODUS has 26 episodes, the first half aired between January and April 2015 and the second half airs between October and December 2015. It takes place two and a half years after the events in Heaven and Earth. The first opening theme is "EXIST" and the first ending theme is "An'ya Kōro" (暗夜航路, lit. "Dark Night Route"). Both songs are replaced in episode 18 with "DEAD OR ALIVE" as the new opening and "Horizon" as the new ending. The insert song in episode 9 is "Sono toki, Soukyuu e" (その時、蒼穹へ, lit. "At that Time, to the Azure"), the special ending theme in episode 17 is "Aisuru koto" (愛すること, lit. "To Love").

All opening, insert and ending theme songs are written and performed by Japanese band angela.

== Episode list ==
=== Fafner in the Azure: Dead Aggressor (2004) ===
No.	Title	Original release date
1	"Paradise ~ The Beginning"; Transliteration: "Rakuen ~ Hajimari" (Japanese: 楽園 ～ はじまり)	July 4, 2004
Maya Tōmi visits Shōko Hazama, who is sick in bed, before heading to school. Sōshi Minashiro, given a book sealed in an envelope, is believed to have returned from Tokyo. Kazuki Makabe senses a strange feeling in the sky. All schoolchildren are requested to be sheltered while the Alvis base has detected a Sphinx Type Festum. The pilots are overwhelmed by the Festum's attacks. Kazuki is convinced by Sōshi to pilot the Fafner Mark Elf, while Sōshi links with the Siegfried System to be directly connected to Kazuki.
2	"Confession ~ Life"; Transliteration: "Kokuchi ~ Inochi" (Japanese: 告知 ～ いのち)	July 11, 2004
The Festum is able to sense and anticipate Kazuki's moves. Kazuki is given a rail gun at the last moment and is able to defeat the enemy. In the aftermath, many children were oblivious to find out of their parents' involvement with previous alien invasions. Sōshi reveals to Kazuki that Japan was destroyed twenty-nine years ago. When Kazuki comes home, he tells his father, Fumihiko Makabe, that he will become a pilot. During his first training session, Kazuki tries on a synergetic suit for the first time.
3	"Labyrinth ~ Truth"; Transliteration: "Meikyū ~ Shinjitsu" (Japanese: 迷宮 ～ しんじつ)	July 18, 2004
Various children on the island are selected by Fumihiko and Dr. Chizuru Tōmi for enrollment into the service, much to the despair of many parents. The children, having been chosen to be candidates for piloting the Fafners, go through their first training sessions. Meanwhile, Kazuki follows after a red female ghost, discovering that her body is confined in the basement of the base. The island is scheduled to be relocated, however a search plane flies in the direction of the island, and an enemy appears at a bad time.
4	"Escape ~ Departure"; Transliteration: "Tōkō ~ Funade" (Japanese: 逃航 ～ ふなで)	July 25, 2004
Kazuki rescues the search plane, which was being chased by the Festum, despite the specific instruction not to do so. As the island begins to move, the search plane watches as the two battle the Festum. The island releases its camouflage to prevent any further damage to occur. The female core saves the Fafner from falling into the ocean, while trapping the Festum at the same time, allowing Kazuki to shoot down the alien. However, due to the island being seen, the search plane gives a report back to its headquarters.
5	"Promise ~ Pledge"; Transliteration: "Yakusoku ~ Chikai" (Japanese: 約束 ～ ちかい)	August 1, 2004
The Neo UN secretary general, Hester Gallop, requests that the Alvis base should give the Fafner Mark Sechs to the Neo UN fleet via submarine. After Shōko faints in her anemic condition, Kōyō Kasugai visits her in the nurse's office, and Kazuki and Maya later come by as well. As the Neo UN fleet approaches the island, it is suddenly attacked by a Festum. Kazuki prepares to face the Festum while concurrently saving the fleet. A second Festum breaches the security of the island and begins to attack the pilots.
6	"Soaring Sky ~ Sacrifice"; Transliteration: "Kakezora ~ Gisei" (Japanese: 翔空 ～ ぎせい)	August 15, 2004
While Kazuki is preoccupied with dealing with the first Festum, Shōko acts decisively to save the island by piloting the Fafner Mark Sechs. Even as Shōko repeatedly attacks the second Festum with a mine blade, the alien manages to pierce the Fafner. Out of ideas, Shōko launches the Festum into the atmosphere, activating a self-destruction sequence. The other children watch as Shōko disappears along with the Festum attached to her.
7	"Family ~ Parents and Children"; Transliteration: "Kazoku ~ Oyako" (Japanese: 家賊 ～ おやこ)	August 22, 2004
Kōyō mourns for Shoko's death, wishes that there was a way to bring her back. Sakura Kaname, on the other hand, sees her death as a sign of valor. Kōyō and Sakura train against Kazuki using paintball pellet guns. It is found out that Kōyō's chromosomes began to change during the training session, while Sakura appears to be normal. Another island is discovered, in which a scouting team is assembled to investigate the area. Sōshi suggest that Sakura should stay behind to be ready for a possible enemy attack.
8	"Strife ~ Kouyou"; Transliteration: "Kakushitsu ~ Kōyō" (Japanese: 確執 ～ こうよう)	August 29, 2004
The team arrives on the apparently uninhabited island, and various units set out to explore it. Maya is summoned to treat people who were wounded in a submarine hangar. Meanwhile, some others find a red male core inside an abandoned command center, who surrounds the island with a horde of Festums. Kyōsuke Mizoguchi finds Maya, who is still in the hangar, however he is forced by Yukie Kariya to activate the self-destruction sequence. Sōshi allows Kōyō to rescue Maya and Kyōsuke underground into the ocean, while Kazuki and Sakura help fight off the Festums on the surface.
9	"Assimilation ~ Parting"; Transliteration: "Dōka ~ Wakare" (Japanese: 同化 ～ わかれ)	September 5, 2004
Kōyō, being suddenly attacked by a Festum, gives Kazuki the submarine containing Maya and Kyōsuke, before being dragged down into the ocean. Sakura manages to take Kōyō's cockpit out his Fafner, moments before the vacant island is demolished. It is seen that Kōyō began to lose much of his memories. The other children find out that his central nervous system was assimilated. Meanwhile, Kōyō's parents are distraught to have raised a useless child, as they are now banished from the island.
10	"Disintegration ~ Crossing Paths"; Transliteration: "Bunkai ~ Surechigai" (Japanese: 分解 ～ すれちがい)	September 12, 2004
Kazuki recalls that he caused Sōshi to lose his left eye. Hiroto Dōma rebels and locks himself up in the school's broadcasting studio, apparently upset that his dreams of stardom may not be fulfilled. He feels like he is trapped in a cage, unable to see the real world. Once convinced of unlocking the door, he apologizes for his action. Later that day, Maya invites Kazuki over to her house for dinner with her family. After Kazuki voices to Maya how he has changed since the alien invasions, he suddenly feels a sharp pain in his chest. When Maya leaves, he is shown to have green crystals growing from his hands.
11	"Old & New ~ The Neo U.N. Force"; Transliteration: "Kyūshin ~ Jinruigun" (Japanese: 旧新 ～ じんるいぐん)	September 19, 2004
Kazuki leaves the remote island with Yukie, taking the Fafner Mark Elf with him, arriving at a rundown city. Both Fumihiko and Kyōsuke speculate about the sudden departure. After Kazuki and Yukie decide to make camp, they are then attacked by a Festum. Michio Hino and Canon Memphis, both piloting Fafners, appear and annihilate the Festum. However, the two then turn on Kazuki and disable his Fafner. Both Kazuki and Yukie is taken prisoner aboard the Neo UN fleet, having the Fafner Mark Elf in its possession. Sōshi tells Maya that Kazuki wanted to escape from the island, though she disagrees with him.
12	"Absence ~ Desperation"; Transliteration: "Fuzai ~ Aseri" (Japanese: 不在 ～ あせり)	September 26, 2004
Mamoru Kōdate, Kenji Kondō, and Sakura Kaname are among the candidates to pilot the Fafners. Meanwhile, Kazuki and Yukie are questioning the reason of their imprisonment. As a new Festum approaches, the new pilots are soon tested to defeat it. Mamoru devises a plan, ignoring Sōshi's specified orders. The three collaboratively succeed in defeating the Festum, yet they are put in confinement for acting on their own judgment. Sōshi learns from Fumihiko that Kazuki denies himself daily, bypassing any assimilation. Maya realizes that Sōshi has feelings for Kazuki. Michio brings Kazuki to the deck of the ship, also encountering Canon, before arriving at the Moldova base.
13	"Erosion ~ Festum"; Transliteration: "Shinshoku ~ Fesutumu" (Japanese: 侵蝕 ～ フェストゥム)	October 3, 2004
Mitsuhiro Bertrand says that Japan was destroyed thirty years ago when toxins were emitted from the core, which prevented citizens unable to produce offspring, marking the beginning of the attempted genocide of humanity by the Festums. When the Alvis base was founded, children were able to become immune to the Festums through gene manipulation. Hester deceptively announces of a new weapon capable of defeating Festums, having the Fafner Mark Elf displayed. Yōji Hino, who revealed he had left the island five years ago to create weapons for the Neo UN fleet, offers Kazuki to work for him as a staff member. The Grendel Type Festums invade the Moldova, prompting Kazuki to fight back.
14	"Awakening ~ Occupation"; Transliteration: "Kakusei ~ Senryō" (Japanese: 覚醒 ～ せんりょう)	October 10, 2004
Maya and Kyōsuke go on a mission to rescue Kazuki at Moldova base. At the same time, the Neo UN fleet invades the Alvis base, trying to secure the island by taking control of the red female core, revealed to be a Coagula Type Festum, however it has left its container. Meanwhile, Yōji manages to persuade Mjölnir, the Master Type Festum which has assimilated Akane Makabe, to give the Fafner Mark Sein to Kazuki. Yukie, as well as Col. Dudley Barns, questions Fumihiko and Sōshi concerning the whereabouts of the female core, but the latter two are unaware of its current location. While Kyōsuke fends off the Festum in the laboratory, Yōji gives Maya the research data of the Fafner Mark Sein.
15	"Memory ~ Scream"; Transliteration: "Kioku ~ Sakebi" (Japanese: 記憶 ～ さけび)	October 17, 2004
The Neo UN fleet occupies the Alvis base, however the female island core is still reported missing. Back at the Moldova base, Kazuki receives the Fafner Mark Sein from Mjölnir. Idun, another Master Type Festum, consumes Mjölnir, enraging Kazuki as he continues to fight. Both Kazuki and Idun sink into a lava pit generated by the Fafner Mark Sein. Kazuki confronts his internal conflicts about his past of when Sōshi's left eye was first injured and of how the green crystals were first implanted in his body. Maya and Kyōsuke witness Kazuki defeating Idun in the lava pit. Kazuki later tells Maya and Kyōsuke that he is looking forward to protect the island after knowing what he is dealing with.
16	"Friends ~ Welcome Home"; Transliteration: "Hōyū ~ Okaeri" (Japanese: 朋友 ～ おかえり)	October 24, 2004
The Neo UN fleet, taking control of the Alvis base, is faced with a new Festum that begins to assault the island. It is shown that Seri Tatekami was with the female island core, recognized as Tsubaki Minashiro, before she returns to the base. Chizuru later finds Tsubaki and takes her to the lighthouse. Tsubaki leads Fumihiko and Sōshi into a second command center. Mamoru, Kenji, and Sakura barely put up a fight against the Festum, as they are consequently defeated. Kazuki, in the Fafner Mark Sein, arrives in time, synchronizes himself with Sōshi, and eradicates the Festum using a rifle gun and then a lance sword.
17	"Survival ~ Device"; Transliteration: "Seizon ~ Shikake" (Japanese: 生存 ～ しかけ)	October 31, 2004
Maya gives Fumihiko the research data, while Kyōsuke informs that Yōji sacrificed himself to destroy the Festums in the laboratory. Tsubaki, now in the Alvis base, is revealed to be Sōshi's younger sister. Michio is ordered to depart from the island, while Canon is requested to stay. Yukie docks a submarine near the island, and she activates the Fenrir System self-activation sequence. Michio becomes aware of this and warns the base of the threat. Kyōsuke attempts to disarm the sequence, but Canon overrides the system. Michio takes care of the missiles launched by the fleet, while Kazuki, now released from probation, confronts Canon, managing to convince her to disarm the sequence.
18	"Father ~ Memory"; Transliteration: "Chichioya ~ Omoide" (Japanese: 父親 ～ おもいで)	November 7, 2004
Adjusting to life on the island, Michio stays with Yumiko Tōmi, while Canon resides with Yōko Hazama. All the children enjoy a moment at the beach. However, Mitsuhiro visits the island, soon discovering that the results of Maya's pilot aptitude test was falsified. He takes the issue to trial and tries to claim custody of Maya. Nevertheless, he is prevented from doing so by the testimonies of other pilots about the skewing of the test data. Tsubaki verifies all the claims and admits her involvement as well. Mitsuhiro leaves the island, warning the pilots of what is to come.
19	"Maya ~ Sight"; Transliteration: "Maya ~ Manazashi" (Japanese: 真矢 ～ まなざし)	November 14, 2004
Maya, after showing progress during her training session, is assigned to be a sniper with the other pilots. Both Kazuki and Fumihiko are later invited by Michio and Yumiko to eat dinner with Maya and Chizuru. A notice is sent to inform of a bone festival that will take place in the evening to honor those to have been deceased. However, a group of Rare Type Festums soon approach the island, in which all pilots engage in battle against them. Sakura is caught by one of the Festums, and Kazuki manages to save her. Moreover, when another Festum attacks Maya from above, she shoots it at point blank, achieving victory.
20	"Lantern ~ Light"; Transliteration: "Tōka ~ Tomoshibi" (Japanese: 燈火 ～ ともしび)	November 21, 2004
The preparation of the bone festival is underway. Canon and Sakura make amends for what happened during the recent alien invasion. It is seen that Kōyō, in his assimilated state, is released by Tsubaki after Chizuru had froze him in the capsule. The islanders enjoy the evening at the bone festival. The following day, the pilots realize that Kōyō has left the base. They barricade him in a shrine to protect him. Sōshi spars with Kazuki, while Kyōsuke prepares to snipe Kōyō. When Canon arrives, Kōyō is reminded of Shōko from her clothing, as he is brought back to normal from his assimilated state.
21	"Sakura ~ Future"; Transliteration: "Sakura ~ Mirai" (Japanese: 咲良 ～ みらい)	November 28, 2004
After the pilots relax in the bathhouse, they are told that a training camp will be conducted during the weekend. Meanwhile, Fumihiko deduces that the recent strings of alien invasions may be a diversion to a separate agenda. As the pilots later defeat eight Festums spotted coming towards the island, sunflowers and cherry blossoms spontaneously begin to bloom. During the second phase of the training camp, the pilots are given assigned cleaning duties. They each then deal with their personal feelings and fears after the training camp.
22	"Protection ~ Power"; Transliteration: "Ibutsu ~ Chikara" (Japanese: 守護 ～ ちから)	December 5, 2004
Sakura has revealed to have undergone assimilation, due to the recent alien invasion when she was caught by one of the Rare Type Festums. After the pilots defeat three Festums, they all react upon seeing Sakura hospitalized. Fumihiko confronts Tsubaki about the string of alien invasions and the island's change of weather and wildlife. The idea of integrating the Siegfried System within the Fafner Mark Sein is mentioned and discussed at the base. A new Festum appears and counters each attack of the pilots, leaving them unable to fight. Mamoru desperately attempts to immobilize the Festum, while Kazuki successfully runs the lance sword through the Festum. However, Mamoru is killed in the process.
23	"Pillage ~ Decoy"; Transliteration: "Gōka ~ Otori" (Japanese: 劫掠 ～ おとり)	December 12, 2004
At a Neo UN development base, Yukie is being tested to pilot the Fafner Mark Nicht, however Idun, who has taken human form, assimilates Yukie and destroys the development facility. Kazuki, Maya, and Canon are unable to bring Kenji back to the Alvis base, following Mamoru's death. Sōshi, still in the Siegfried System, faces his past. Kazuki, assisted by Tsubaki, tries to save Sōshi. However, Idun suddenly attacks the island and attempts to assimilate the entire base. Though Maya, Michio, and Canon intercept, they are easily defeated. Michio then activates the self-destruction sequence and attempts to ejects, but he is captured and dies in the blast. Also, Sōshi disappears, along with the Siegfried System, infuriating Kazuki.
24	"Conversation ~ Mir"; Transliteration: "Kyokugen ~ Mīru" (Japanese: 対話 ～ ミール)	December 19, 2004
Akane, still assimilated with Mjolnir, is rejected from merging with Meir, as she proceeds to the island. Kazuki and Maya visit Kenji with Kiyomi Kaname, in which Kenji challenges Kazuki to a match. Fumihiko decides to join the Neo UN fleet in an operation to take the core of the Festums, much to the dismay of Kyouhei. Before the deployment of the remaining pilots, Mjolnir arrives on the island, explaining Fumihiko how Akane has accepted and blessed the Festums. Mjolnir then gives them data to reduce the assimilation process and to restore people who have been assimilated. Both Koyo and Mjolnir fend off the Festums attacking the island, as the pilots prepare for departure to the final battle.
25	"Azure ~ The Sky"; Transliteration: "Sōkyū ~ Sora" (Japanese: 蒼穹 ～ そら)	December 26, 2004

For the DVD version, the special final 25th episode was split into two parts:

No.	Title	Original release date
25	"The Final Battle ~ Symbiosis"; Transliteration: "Kessen ~ Kyōsei" (Japanese: 決戦 ～ きょうせい)	December 26, 2004
Kazuki, Maya, Kenji, and Canon, all accompanied by Kyōsuke, charge straight towards the entrance of the core in order to rescue Sōshi, who is revealed to be inside the core. During the operation, Tsubaki is experiencing the death process to complete the learning process for the Festums to understand life and death. Moreover, she will need to return to the core to complete this process. Kenji maps out a plan of attack, Canon confirms the battle formations, and Maya reminds that all pilots will return to the island alive. Sōshi is being controlled by Idun, who uses the Siegfried System to exploit the weaknesses of the pilots, that being to break their battle formation.
26	"Azure ~ The Sky"; Transliteration: "Sōkyū ~ Sora" (Japanese: 蒼穹 ～ そら)	December 26, 2004
The four pilots all reunite and defeat Idun together. Meanwhile, Tsubaki struggles with her emotions at leaving to synchronize with the island core. Kazuki, with the help of Akane, manages to rescue Sōshi, bearing the assimilation. but Kazuki loses his vision due to the assimilation phenomenon. As the Meir begins to make its way to the atmosphere, Maya snipes at it, preventing it from spreading all over the world. Tsubaki has become one with island, as she dissolves into thin air. Idun, barely alive in the Fafner Mark Nicht, hinders Kazuki and Sōshi from leaving the battlefield, but Kōyō is able to save the two. On their way to the island, Sōshi vanishes because of his near assimilated state.

=== Fafner in the Azure: Arcadian Memory (2005) ===
No.	Title	Original release date
OVA	"Fafner in the Azure: Arcadian Memory I"; Transliteration: "Soukyuu no Fafner: Arcadian Memory I - Tsuioku no Rakuen" (Japanese: 蒼穹のファフナー Arcadian memory I 追憶の楽園)	November 2, 2005
First part of the two-part OVA that summarizes the series.
OVA	"Fafner in the Azure: Arcadian Memory II"; Transliteration: "Soukyuu no Fafner: Arcadian Memory II - Taiwa no Sekai" (Japanese: 蒼穹のファフナー Arcadian memory II 対話の世界)	January 12, 2006
Final part of the two-part OVA that summarizes the series.

=== Fafner in the Azure: Right of Left (2005) ===
No.	Title	Original release date
TV–Special	"Fafner in the Azure: Right of Left"; Transliteration: "Sōkyū no Fafunā Raito obu Refuto" (Japanese: 蒼穹のファフナー RIGHT OF LEFT)	December 30, 2005
Yumi and Ryō are children who have been selected to take part in a top secret mission, to be the pilots of the first Fafner combat units, the last chance of survival for the human race. The enemy is ruthless, remorseless and able to read the minds of humans. Therefore, the details of this mission are kept secret, even from the personnel involved. The young pilots must use all their courage and faith in order to survive and complete their mission, or the fate of mankind would be compromised.

=== Fafner in the Azure: Heaven and Earth (2010) ===
No.	Title	Original release date
Film	"Fafner in the Azure: Heaven and Earth" (Japanese: 蒼穹のファフナー HEAVEN AND EARTH)	December 25, 2010
The year is 2148. Two years after the end of the original Fafner in the Azure TV series, Tatsumiya Island and its surviving residents have returned to some semblance of recovery. However, things have become desperate for our hero, Kazuki; nearly blind now, and partially crippled from his battles with the Festum two years earlier, he clings to the promise his fallen friend Sōshi made to him to return to the island and set things right again. Kazuki's hopes flare when a lifeform is detected within an unmanned submarine that comes floating into Tatsumiya Bay one night, but the person aboard isn't Sōshi; it is a mysterious "boy" named Misao Kurusu who may not be entirely human, and who claims to have been sent by Sōshi. With Misao's arrival, hostilities break out anew between the Human Army and the Festum, and the Fafner pilots are thrown into the most desperate battle of their lives--this time, with the fate of TWO races riding on their shoulders.

=== Fafner in the Azure: Exodus (2015) ===
No.	Title	Original release date
1	"Visitors"; Transliteration: "Raihōsha" (Japanese: 来訪者)	January 8, 2015
2	"The Name of Hope"; Transliteration: "Kibō no Na wa" (Japanese: 希望の名は)	January 15, 2015
3	"The Price of A Conversation"; Transliteration: "Taiwa no Daishō" (Japanese: 対話の代償)	January 22, 2015
4	"The Successors"; Transliteration: "Keishoushatachi" (Japanese: 継承者たち)	January 29, 2015
5	"To A New World"; Transliteration: "Shinsekai e" (Japanese: 新世界へ)	February 5, 2015
6	"Blessed Time"; Transliteration: "Shukufuku no Toki" (Japanese: 祝福のとき)	February 12, 2015
7	"Battle in A New Dimension"; Transliteration: "Shin Jigen Sentō" (Japanese: 新次元戦闘)	February 19, 2015
8	"Dreaming of Peace"; Transliteration: "Heiwa wo Yume Mite" (Japanese: 平和を夢見て)	February 26, 2015
9	"The Two Heroes"; Transliteration: "Eiyū Futari" (Japanese: 英雄二人)	March 5, 2015
10	"To the Land of Hope"; Transliteration: "Kibō no Chi e" (Japanese: 希望の地へ)	March 12, 2015
11	"Transformation"; Transliteration: "Henbō" (Japanese: 変貌)	March 19, 2015
12	"Children of the Battlefield"; Transliteration: "Senjō no Kodomotachi" (Japanese: 戦場の子供たち)	March 26, 2015
13	"A Future Within the Darkness"; Transliteration: "Yami no Naka no Mirai" (Japanese: 闇の中の未来)	April 2, 2015
14	"The March for Dawn"; Transliteration: "Yoake no Kōshin" (Japanese: 夜明けの行進)	October 2, 2015
15	"ROE Alpha"; Transliteration: "Kōsen Kitei Arufa" (Japanese: 交戦規定アルファ)	October 9, 2015
16	"Where Life Is"; Transliteration: "Inochi no Yukue" (Japanese: 命の行方)	October 16, 2015
17	"Flames of the Final Farewell"; Transliteration: "Eiketsu no Hi" (Japanese: 永訣の火)	October 23, 2015
18	"Layering Sins Upon Sins"; Transliteration: "Tsumi wo Kasanete" (Japanese: 罪を重ねて)	October 30, 2015
19	"The Oath of the Living"; Transliteration: "Shōja no Chikai" (Japanese: 生者の誓い)	November 6, 2015
20	"The Soldiers Return Home"; Transliteration: "Senshi no Kikan" (Japanese: 戦士の帰還)	November 13, 2015
21	"Time of Awakening"; Transliteration: "Mezame no Toki" (Japanese: 目覚めの時)	November 20, 2015
22	"Memories of Hatred"; Transliteration: "Nikushimi no Kioku" (Japanese: 憎しみの記憶)	November 27, 2015
23	"Power Without Reason"; Transliteration: "Riyū Naki Chikara" (Japanese: 理由なき力)	December 4, 2015
24	"The Third Alvis"; Transliteration: "Dai San Aruvisu" (Japanese: 第三アルヴィス)	December 11, 2015
25	"Operation Azure"; Transliteration: "Soukyuu Sakusen" (Japanese: 蒼穹作戦)	December 18, 2015
26	"Tatsumiyajima"; Transliteration: "Tatsumiyajima" (Japanese: 竜宮島)	December 25, 2015
