= List of Hanasakeru Seishōnen episodes =

The cover of the first DVD compilation released by Studio Pierrot.

The episodes of Hanasakeru Seishōnen are produced by Studio Pierrot. The series premiered on April 5, 2009, on the NHK, and ended in 2010. It has a total of 39 episodes. The series was directed by Chiaki Kon until episode 20, but changed afterward to Hajime Kamegaki for unknown reasons. Two pieces of theme music are used, one opening theme and one ending theme. The opening theme, "Change", and the ending theme, "One", are both performed by J-Min.

== Episode listings ==
No.	Title	Original release date
1	"Innocent Girl"; Transliteration: "Inosento gāru" (Japanese: イノセントガール)	April 5, 2009
Kajika transfers to a Japanese middle school from America and becomes good friends with her classmate Yui Yamate, and stays in Japan for a day. However, on the day she arrives, Kajika attracts the attention of a bad senior, and at the end of school, she is cornered by that senior and her gang. Kajika's bodyguard Haga Toranosuke comes to save her but is unable to because one guy holds her, so she gets into the car and agrees to go. Once there, the leader decides that he wants her to be his but she states, "How do you intend to make me yours, my heart isn't even here". Just as the gang is about to attack her, Li-Ren, who Kajika has the utmost faith in, appears and protects her. This encounter foreshadows a dangerous conflict, setting the stage for Kajika's journey of navigating both school life and hidden threats.
2	"Circling Love"; Transliteration: "Meguriai" (Japanese: 廻り愛)	April 12, 2009
Kajika accepts a proposal to participate in a "marriage game" from her father, Harry Burnsworth. One day, she meets Eugene Du Vorkan, whom Kajika believes is the reincarnation of her beloved white leopard Mustafa. She visits his apartment to confirm her suspicions. Li-Ren who is in charge of overseeing the "marriage game" suspects that Eugene is one of the husband candidates chosen by Harry. In addition to Eugene's candidacy suspicion, Li-Ren also has an uneasy feeling about him, and looks into his background. At the same time that Li-Ren is receiving the background report on him, a woman appears in Eugene's room with a gun.
3	"Sleepless Night"; Transliteration: "nemurenu yoru" (Japanese: 眠れぬ夜)	April 19, 2009
Li-Ren determines that getting involved with Eugene is dangerous, and locks Kajika in her room. However, irritated by Li-Ren's actions, Eugene decides that he won't let things end like that and that very night, Eugene sneaks Kajika out of the house right past Li-Ren's security. They hide out in his father's secondary residence and end up talking for quite a while. Kajika tells Eugene—who doesn't care what happens to himself—how she feels. Eugene's two older brothers come to see what all the commotion is about. Li-Ren arrives and takes Kajika home. Later, Li-Ren tells Kajika she can go to Paris for Eugene's birthday. The episode ends with Li-Ren learning that Eugene probably isn't Baron Vulcan's real son.
4	"The Day When the Long Night Ends"; Transliteration: "Nagaki yoru no akeru hi" (Japanese: 長き夜の明ける日)	April 26, 2009
Kajika visits the Vorkan house on the day that Eugene is set to celebrate his twentieth birthday with his family. Thrown off balance by Kajika's unexpected visit, Eugene yells at Kajika to get out, but his family intervenes and invites her to stay. Because of Eugene's outburst, Kajika becomes extremely worried. The Vorkan's butler pleads with her to save Eugene's soul. As such, Kajika and the others wait on standby in another room as Eugene's birthday party commences. At the party, Eugene reveals to the others that he knows about the secret surrounding his birth and that this has severely depressed him. He then hands his father a gun and pleads to be put out of his misery. Feeling hurt, Eugene runs to the 3rd floor of the mansion and wanted to jump out the very same window as his mother did. Kajika hurries to the room and shoots Eugene's reflection in the mirror and she then says that the old Eugene is now dead and now a new Eugene has been born. Kajika lovingly calls Eugene out using the name Mustafa and Eugene embraces Kajika whilst crying.
5	"Encounters ~ Reunions"; Transliteration: "deai ~ saikai" (Japanese: 出会い～再会)	May 3, 2009
Kajika and Haga Toranosuke go to Li-Ren's party and meet several people. Kajika starts talking to Li-Ren's aunt, who gives her a key to the greenhouse saying that she should go out the back and take a breather. Haga cannot find her and everyone starts to look for her. Meanwhile the aunt is planning something bad in regards to Kajika and tells Leon "she should be helpless against the wiles of a city man, pull this off nicely, Leon". Inside the greenhouse, Kajika meets Leon for the first time, and he begins to hit on her; but she is oblivious as ever and starts to walk away saying she won't talk to him because she doesn't know him that well. He carries on saying that he's in love and she's ignoring him, she tells him that he's not one of the men her dad picked for the game and in enters, Rumati Ivan, the second prince of Raginei. The man hitting on Kajika tells him to go away and Rumati beats him up for hitting him on the head and knocking his sunglasses off. Kajika sees that the boy has blue eyes with black hair and finds it strange and interesting. Back in his room, Rumaty is stubbornly disagreeing with Quinza; his serving man, over wearing the holy cloth, which is worn on the head to show respect to their sun god; Quinza threatens to slit his own throat unless he wears the cloth. Kajika sneaks out because she can't sleep and meets Rumati on the way out, they start to talk, unwanted by Rumati, and learn new stuff about each other, Rumati gives his cloth to Kajika and minutes later they run into assassins.
6	"Pure Heart"; Transliteration: "Junshin" (Japanese: 純心)	May 10, 2009
Kajika and Rumati both take a stroll and Rumati asks Kajika to leave him alone. Kajika mildly threatens to shout and alert the others of Rumati's absence and this causes Rumati to allow Kajika to follow him. Kajika introduces herself and asks Rumati all sorts of questions. There was an instance where when Kajika showed admiration for the Raginei's headgear and clothing, Rumati took off his headgear and gave it to Kajika. Kajika placed the headgear on her head and under the romantic moonlight, Rumati was briefly enchanted with Kajika's beauty that is, until a lorry sped and wanted to ram into Rumati. Sensing something amiss, Rumati took hold of Kajika and both try to escape the assassins. In the woods, they encountered two persons from the Hong Kong Street Kids ( a small scale gangster group). One of the guys wanted to toy with Kajika and suddenly a third guy, who appears to have a higher authority allowed both Kajika and Rumati to tell their story and that is when he gave both of them shelter for the night. Meanwhile, Li-Ren as trusted by Quinza to, used the Huang's family influences to hurriedly find both Kajika and Rumati. As the search for Rumati and Kajika was on, Kajika was quick to make friends with all three guys from the HK Street Kids throughout the night but suddenly, the assassins, who included Lieutenant Noei from Raginei, found the hideout and attacked incessantly.
7	"Feelings for Someone"; Transliteration: "Taga tameno Omoi" (Japanese: 誰が為の想い)	May 17, 2009
As Noei grabbed hold of the knife to stab Rumati, he couldn't bring himself to kill him and even took a shot for Rumati in order to save him. Later, the police, together with Li-Ren and Toranosuke arrives in time to save them and capture the faulters. Noei was then treated and he refused to admit that it was Rumati's older brother( who fears that Rumati will succeed the throne) who ordered the killing.
8	"Promise"; Transliteration: "Puromisu" (Japanese: プロミス)	May 24, 2009
Noei was cast off as a Ragineian and decides to then work with the Burnsworths as a bodyguard. He was still loyal to the Raginei royalty though. The episode ends with Rumati and his fellow men leaving for Raginei. Rumati receives a peck on the cheek from Kajika, which made him blush and also take a liking to Kajika. He promises her that he'll return soon.
9	"Something that Never Changes"; Transliteration: "Kawaranai mono" (Japanese: 変わらないもの)	May 31, 2009
Eugene, unable to contact Kajika, decides to go to Japan to meet her friend Yui. He goes to Yui's school and introduced himself as Kajika's fiance, Yui is overjoyed that Kajika has not forgotten her. Afterward, Eugene asks Yui if he could see her house too. Meanwhile, Kajika finds out that Eugene is also in Japan. Together with Toranoske and Li-Ren they also go to Yui's house. They find Eugene there, wearing a yukata. Sparks ignite between Li-Ren and Eugene (who doesn't know a word in Japanese, hence is talking in English), ending with Li-Ren cooking Beijing style food to prove that he is better. They have dinner with Yui's family and then they take their picture together.
10	"Cross Days"; Transliteration: "Kurosu Deizu" (Japanese: クロス・デイズ)	June 7, 2009
In the flashback set in 1955, Mahaty, grandfather of Rumati, who was then just Crown Prince of Raginei comes to America for a conference. He is attacked by assassins in his hotel room and fled by hiding in a laundry cart. He later finds himself in the slums where he meets Kathleen (or Katherine). They go into a bar where she introduces Mahaty to Fred Burnsworth, Kajika's grandfather. Mahaty gets drunk on champagne and ends up sleeping in Kathleen's apartment. In the morning they discover who Mahaty really was. In the present, Kajika visits Fred. They talk about the husband hunting game and Kajika shows Fred, pictures of the 2 candidates. When Fred sees the picture of Rumaty, he thought it was Mahaty. He gets a heart attack.
11	"Shape of Love"; Transliteration: "Ai no Katachi" (Japanese: アイのカタチ)	June 14, 2009
Mahaty, for his protection, resides with Kathleen, who was made Lady of the Inner Court by Mahati. Assassins once again came for Mahaty and both he and Kathleen flee through the fire escape while Mahaty's attendant holds the assassin back. Mahaty and Kathleen were cornered however, Mahaty was able to subdue the pursuers using his word as King. Mahaty and Kathleen talked. And one thing led to another. Mahaty proposed to Kathleen then returned to Raginei to get permission from his father, leaving Kathleen in Fred's hands and promising to return. In the present, Kajika learns of the truth behind her father's lineage. Fred then burns the manuscript of the novel he was writing. A novel about Mahaty.
12	"Alone"; Transliteration: "Hitori" (Japanese: ヒトリ)	June 21, 2009
Eugene has been kicked out of his apartment and stays with Kajika for the time being. Meanwhile, Rumati returns to America and stays in Kajika's mansion for one week. Later, he finds that his father has died, and he has been accused of high treason.
13	"Country of the Sun"; Transliteration: "Taiyō no Kuni" (Japanese: 太陽の国)	July 5, 2009
Kajika, Toranosuke and Eugene leave for Raginei. Li-Ren finds out about the unusual succession system in Raginei and realizes that Kajika is first in line for the throne. Carl Rosenthal meets the head chamberlain and finds out that the country is unstable. Later, in the hotel, Eugene declares that he will be attending Prince Izmal's party.
14	"Warmth"; Transliteration: "Nukumori" (Japanese: ぬくもり)	July 12, 2009
Eugene visits Rumaty's cousin at his mansion and learns that there is someone else pulling the strings from the shadows. Noei, sensing the presence of a shadow behind Somand, tells only Sezun that he plans to return to Raginei using a secret route through Malaysia. Rumaty, hiding in the shadows overhears the conversation. Meanwhile, Kajika worries about Eugene who has decided to go alone to a royal family party hosted by Izmal. She decides to do anything in her power to help him. However, in the next moment, the hotel elevator where she had coincidentally met Carl breaks down, and the two are trapped inside.
15	"Moonlight Medium"; Transliteration: "Gekka no Miko" (Japanese: 月下の巫女)	July 19, 2009
While at Izmal's manson, Eugene is summoned by Najayra, who, apart from being part of royalty, also possesses authority as a shaman. Najayra, who had been interested in Kajika, mentions to Eugene that she had wanted to meet him, since he was Kajika's friend. Eugene uses this opportunity to find out more about Najayra's secrets. However, Eugene becomes overwhelmed by Najayra's strong personality. Meanwhile, Kajika arrives at the US embassy and finds out that Carl's father has resentment towards Harry.
16	"Pride"; Transliteration: "Puraido" (Japanese: プライド)	July 26, 2009
Eugene returns to the hotel where Kajika was waiting. Kajika is relieved that he was safe. Then she receives two letters; an invitation to Somand's enthronement celebration held one month later, and a letter from Najayra. At that time, Rumaty was being hidden in the Burnsworth residence, but he escapes. As he is rejoicing his freedom, Rumaty is discovered by the people hired by Raginei.
17	"Feelings That Don't Reach"; Transliteration: "Todokanu Omoi" (Japanese: 届かぬ想い)	August 2, 2009
Li-Ren sustains a gun wound in a failed attempt to rescue Rumaty. Unsure if his tactics may work, in a last-ditch effort, he tries to leverage his position as the leader of the Huang group to pay off the men who were hired by Raginei. Though the men are shaken by his offer and waver from deep inside, they bring Rumaty and Li-Ren on board their boat, one step closer to being handed over.
18	"Opposition"; Transliteration: "Opojishon" (Japanese: オポジション)	August 23, 2009
Najayra invites Kajika to her mansion. Although she seems welcoming on the outside, deep down, Najayra has her own agenda. However, Kajika is not intimidated by her intentions, while Toranosuke feels the uneasy tension between them. In addition, Najayra has invited Carl to her mansion. Knowing that Kajika and Carl are corporate enemies, Najayra enjoys trying to elicit a reaction from the two. Despite Najayra's plot, Kajika is not affected by this and asks Carl about the quarrels between their fathers.
19	"Uncontrollable Emotions"; Transliteration: "Osaekirenai Kimochi" (Japanese: おさえきれない気持ち)	August 30, 2009
Suddenly, Quinza appears in front of Kajika to check if Rumaty was not injured by the previous kidnapping incident. Kajika, sensing a deep compassion in Quinza's eyes towards Rumaty, asks of his intentions. Meanwhile, Carl quickly returns home after hearing from his father, Nelson. Upon arrival, Carl finds out about the investigation of Harry's birth and Nelson's attempt to take back Raginei from Burnsworth.
20	"Turning Point"; Transliteration: "Taaningu Pointo" (Japanese: ターニングポイント)	September 6, 2009
Hearing from Kajika that she met Quinza, Rumaty does not inquire about anything and quietly accepts the fact. After a while, Harry appears before Rumaty, who is alone in the garden. Rumaty is initially cautious of Harry since he does not know him but is intrigued by his words. At this time, Harry tells Rumaty to become the king. Oddly, Rumaty feels as if he was told by his father. Then Harry meets Eugene and Carl later on to talk about Kajika.
21	"Unforgettable Feelings"; Transliteration: "Wasurenu Omoi" (Japanese: 忘れえぬ想い)	September 13, 2009
Kajika enters Raginei a moment before the coronation of the new king, Somand. When the group arrives at the hotel, Harry asks for Li-Ren. Harry insists that Li-Ren comes by himself and confesses to him the true purpose of Kajika's husband hunting. Although Li-Ren suspected something, he was not able to contain his disbelief in regards to the heavy fate Kajika carried. Furthermore, Harry strikes an emotional blow to Li-Ren with more grueling reality.
22	"Repose"; Transliteration: "Ripōsu" (Japanese: リポーズ)	September 20, 2009
This episodes starts out with a letter addressed to Kajika's Japanese school friend Yui. While Yui is being flown to New York, Eugene is away in Austria as it is the anniversary of his mother's death. Yui meets Rumaty and automatically thinks of him as having the appearance of a prince. Due to the dangerous nature of his identity he is introduced as Rumanty Ivan a visiting friend from Singapore. While in Singapore Li-Ren meets with Carl, where he reveals who the Rosenthal group intends to support. He explains that the plan is to force both Rumaty and Somand into a confrontation in which the hope is that they would both destroy each other. Carl and his father are opposed, Carl can not support the idea of determining one nation's future on the basis of one company's profit. What is even worse is the fact that his father has based this decision on his emotions and grudges. Carl admits to Li-Ren that when he thinks of Kajika he can imagine there being no quarrel between Rosenthal and Burnsworth. Carl tells Li-Ren of how Harry Burnsworth came to him almost a year ago and said "If you want her, you can have her. It all depends on Kajika". Carl wants Kajika and intends to take him up on that offer.
23	"Farewell"; Transliteration: "Ketsubetsu" (Japanese: 決別)	September 27, 2009
This episode starts off by Kajika putting forth the idea to cut Eugene's hair! Things have changed in the last year, there is an uprising in the North of Raginei and while Noei is rallying forces to fight he doesn't believe that having no monarchy is in the best interest for the country. With the firm belief that Rumaty is the best choice for king he decides to go to America in order to convince him to return to Raginei. Eddie the reporter turns up at Kajika's house with evidence of corruption, there are slums where there previously weren't, prison and execution camps where people are killed without trial. Rumaty has been shown photos that proves all of this is true. While Rumaty ponders this he comes to choose what he will do about it. Will he leave it for his brother to rule? Or will he rise up and take the throne?
24	"Confusion"; Transliteration: "Tomdadoi" (Japanese: とまどい)	October 11, 2009
Everyone is worried about how Rumaty will receive the news about Raginei. He decides to grant an interview in Singapore. Rumaty knows that he will not see Kajika for a while so he asks if he can give her a lover's kiss; he kisses her, but Li-Ren sees the kiss and it seems to make him angry. Kajika is confused about what kind of love she feels for her friends and has a talk with Eugene about it. Rumaty realizes that Li-Ren loves Kajika and has an argument with him. He asks Li-Ren why he won't tell Kajika how he feels. Later, Rumaty apologizes and both of them go to Singapore where the prince gives an interview in which he states that he'll return to Raginei even if just one of his people call for him.
25	"Missing Piece"; Transliteration: "Umaranu Kakera" (Japanese: 埋まらぬ欠片)	October 11, 2009
Mr. Burnsworth is informed on the phone by Li-Ren that the next day Kajika would be flying to Singapore to visit Rumaty. That night, Kajika goes to Carl Rosenthal's apartment in New York to get the update of what was happening in Raginei. Kajika sits there and waits until Carl comes from work. Surprised, he leads her in. Before they can talk much, Carl's three sisters barge in, filled with anger about lowering their allowance to 100,000 a month. Carl gets them even more frustrated and is about to leave the room when one of his sisters turns off the lights, knowing that he is claustrophobic and the dark reminds him of when he was trapped in a well. He falls to the ground, grabbing at his throat while the sisters taunt him. Kajika bursts in from behind a door with a lighter, disgusted. She turns on the lights and throws a vase of flowers at them. She yells, telling them how low it was to use someone's weakness against them. The sisters shriek and leave, telling Kajika that she would regret it. Carl thanks Kajika, as it was the second time she had saved him. He hugs her, saying that he loves her and made him not hate women anymore. He says that he will always wait for her, that she was the girl who opened everything to him.
26	"Puppet"; Transliteration: "Kairai" (Japanese: 傀儡)	October 25, 2009
Eugene attends King Somand's tea party and meets Najayra there, who offers to grant him an audience with King Somand. Noei arrives in Singapore and is shocked by how much Rumaty has changed. Kajika tells Li-Ren that she wants to go to Raginei but he becomes worried about Kajika and refuses. Najayra and Eugene arrive at the Royal Palace. Eugene is shocked when Quinza tells him that Najayra was betrothed to Somand and was supposed to become Queen. Moreover, Najayra is revealed to be Quinza's beloved. When Eugene confronts Quinza about this Quinza tells him that he was going to be detained at the Palace for a while, just to make Kajika worried. Kajika later thinks about the strange connection she feels towards Raginei and wonders why she feels that way.
27	"Heavy Chains"; Transliteration: "Omoi Kusari" (Japanese: 重い鎖)	November 1, 2009
Kajika is set on going to Raginei. Li-Ren has refused. Kajika explains to both Li-Ren and Toranosuke that she believes she must go. Meanwhile news of Eugene's abduction reaches Li-Ren, thinking that there's a high probability that Najayra is behind it. Meanwhile Noei gains the support of Lieutenant Kopel, in which the lieutenant vows to hold soldiers back in order to fight for Rumaty's return. The elders of the Huang group visit in order to inform Li-Ren that a bride has been chosen for him, his cousin Ling-lee. Argument ensues that as the head of the Huang group it is his obligation to settle down and produce an heir, to which Li-Ren refuses. With this in mind Kajika visits Rumaty and shows a flashback to a time in which she and Li-Ren seemed to be closer. Having made up her mind Kajika says farewell to Rumaty and vows that she will see Raginei with her own eyes. To do this she stows away in Ling-lee's car and escapes the property.
28	"Beyond the Differences"; Transliteration: "Surechigai no Saki" (Japanese: すれ違いの先)	November 8, 2009
Kajika successfully escapes from the Huang's country house. Meanwhile, Rumaty questions Li-Ren's decision of strictly not allowing Kajika to go Raginei. He feels that Li-Ren is hiding something important to them and he needs to know it. Li-Ren follows Kajika all by himself. When Kajika arrives at the Raginei Airport, she accidentally sees Carl and asks him if she could come along in search for Eugene. However, Carl refuses but swears to Kajika that he will bring a good outcome. He offers Kajika to stay in his hotel. While waiting for Kajika to get her baggage, Carl suddenly meets Li-Ren who just arrived at the Raginei Airport. Complications arise when the military forces arrived and turned the airport into a war zone. Worried about Kajika's safety, Li-Ren immediately goes inside to find her. Li-Ren injures himself as he tries to protect Kajika. Unexpectedly, Isaac, who was asked by Rumaty to safeguard Kajika, helps them to escape. Towards the end of the episode, Kajika finally confesses that she loves Li-Ren and she does not want him to be in love with another girl. Li-Ren in response tells her that he can never choose any other woman except her. Finally, Li-Ren realizes that he can give up everything he has just to be with Kajika.
29	"Within the Circle of Destiny"; Transliteration: "Unmei no Wa no Naka de" (Japanese: 運命の輪の中で)	November 15, 2009
Toranosuke goes to Harry, since contact with Li-Ren has ceased. Thinking that there is a high possibility of both Li-Ren and Kajika caught up in the coup d'état, Toranosuke, being the first to hear Kajika's feelings, regrets not restraining Kajika from going to Raginei. While at Harry's, new information pops in. On the other hand, Carl visits the American embassy seeking more information on Kajika's whereabouts. While at the embassy Carl's father, Nelson appears and reveals a shocking truth to Carl. Carl ends up finding out about Kajika's lineage from his father but his father wants nothing but to get revenge on the Burnsworths.
30	"Unstoppable Progress"; Transliteration: "Tomaranu Ayumi" (Japanese: 止まらぬ歩み)	November 22, 2009
Quinza plans on capturing Noei and his group but keeping them alive to prove that someone from the government was leaking information about the secret police. The police Quinza sent arrive at the hideout. Kajika, Goslen and Li-Ren escape the hideout using an underground maze. Kajika saves the group from being discovered by pretending to be Rumaty, and asking the members of the police to help her save Raginei from destruction, they believe her and lead the group out of the maze and into safety. Near the end of the episode, Noei is captured by the police. Li-Ren, Goslen and Kajika find a new hideout. Kajika tells Li-Ren that Goslen is trying to get them out of Raginei but she won't leave, because she loves the people of Raginei and the country itself. At the end Quinza meets Noei who was captured and now kept imprisoned.
31	"Unmerging Ideas"; Transliteration: "Majiwaranu Rinen" (Japanese: 交わらぬ理念)	November 29, 2009
Noei tries to convince Quinza to stop his evil tactics, but Quinza declares that their opinions are too different to get along. Eugene's letter reaches Kajika through the American Embassy and Toranosuke. They reunite with Sezun, who reveals that Noei can be rescued before his execution. Kajika declares that she will go to rescue Noei and Eugene, and she manages to convince Li-Ren to let her go. However, in exchange, Li-Ren says that he will step down as the leader of the Huangs. Rumaty decides to return to Raginei.
32	"Lies and Truths"; Transliteration: "Uso to Makoto" (Japanese: 嘘と真)	December 6, 2009
Kajika, Li-Ren, and Sezun have entered the palace in order to rescue Eugene and Noei. Disguised as tailors they reunite with Eugene. Li-Ren leaves Kajika with Eugene in order to head to the jail cell where Noei is held captive. Li-Ren was able to rescue Noei with the help of the priest though on the way to meeting up with Kajika, they come face to face with the guards. On the other hand, danger is approaching Kajika and Eugene, who are waiting for Li-Ren's arrival. Kajika finds out about her lineage.
33	"Seeds of Catastrophe"; Transliteration: "Wazawai no Tane" (Japanese: 災いの種)	December 13, 2009
Najayra realizes that she is both afraid of and loves Quinza. Li-Ren and Eugene head to the airport to welcome Rumaty. Quinza finds out from Carl's elder sister about Kajika's lineage and decides that she must be killed to protect Rumaty.
34	"Triumphant Return"; Transliteration: "Gaisen" (Japanese: 凱旋)	December 20, 2009
After finding out about Kajika's lineage, Quinza set out to kill her. When he was about to stab her with a dagger, Li-Ren appears and shoots Quinza and he falls off the building. After Kajika told Li-Ren how much she wanted to see him because she knows that she's going to die, they share a romantic kiss together.
35	"The Beginning of 1,000 Years"; Transliteration: "Sennen no Makuake" (Japanese: 千年の幕開け)	January 17, 2010
Toranosuke finds Kajika and Li-Ren who were looking for Quinza after his fall and takes them to the airport. Quinza is found and taken to the hospital. In the meantime, Prince Rumaty gives a speech to the crowd at the airport, affirming his will as the last king of Raginei. Kajika and Li-Ren are reunited with Prince Rumaty who was welcomed by Eugene. Eugene notices changes in Kajika and leaves the airport thinking about his feelings. Princess Najayra finds Quinza who came back to the palace, he told her to be happy, she realizes that he never loved her and that she could not kill him. Quinza heads to Prince Somand's room, telling him to listen to a gentle person who is coming to protect him, Quinza badly hurt eventually waits for Prince Rumaty to come.
36	"For Eternity"; Transliteration: "Eien Ni" (Japanese: 永遠に)	January 24, 2010
Rumaty arrives at the palace to Quinza dying and grants him permission to die. He then finds his brother promising to protect him and his brother embraces him. Rumaty then ask Kajika to become his queen yet again when she tells him she has started to realize who it is she loves without having to tell him he knows it was Li-Ren. Rumaty then contemplates the loneliness he will feel without them around when his brother shows up and Rumaty realizes he won't be alone anymore.
37	"Relying on the Course of Love"; Transliteration: "Aisuru ga Yue" (Japanese: 愛するがゆえ)	January 31, 2010
Li-Ren agrees to go back to being the leader of the Huang group and to marry Ling-Lee in order to keep Kajika alive. Meanwhile Maria comes to visit Kajika. Maria says she once knew the day would come when Li-Ren would become Kajika's boyfriend. Li-Ren used to be a lonely person but whenever Kajika shows up he would be happy from the bottom of his heart. Kajika becomes determined to find out the reason that Li-Ren broke his promise to go to Gibori island with her and why he would marry Ling-Lee. Just then Toranosuke bursts in the room saying that Kajika's biological grandfather, Mahaty is in critical condition.
38	"Sharp Words"; Transliteration: "Kizamu Kotoba" (Japanese: 刻む言葉)	February 7, 2010
Carl meets the very depressed Li-Ren for an explanation of the sudden news that he'll be married to his cousin and at the same time tries to convince him to fight his way through this hurdle. Li-Ren was somehow motivated by Carl's words and simultaneously learns of King Mahaty's grave condition. Kajika, Fred and Harry heads to Raginei to visit Mahaty. Kajika who meets her biological grandfather for the first time was motivated to go all the way and fight for her love after listening to Mahaty's words. Rumaty on the other hand is surprised to find out that Kajika is his blood related cousin. After the meet, Kajika tells Harry that she wants to cut ties with him in order to be able to leave out the Burnsworth name and find Li-Ren again. Harry agrees instantaneously although he seemed rather shocked at first. Harry also states that he will only be giving Kajika the Gibori Island, which made Kajika rather happy. Toranosuke was told by Harry that his contract is up but he was persistent on continuing to follow and help Kajika at his own free will. Outside of the Raginei Palace, when Kajika was trying to borrow money from Toranosuke for the taxi and airfare for her journey to Singapore, Eugene appears to be waiting for Kajika and asks Kajika what she really wants at this instant. Kajika tells him that she wants Li-Ren and Eugene states that since that is what she wants, that is what he'll be giving her (Li-Ren).
39	"The Promised Sky"; Transliteration: "Yakusoku no Sora" (Japanese: 約束の空)	February 14, 2010
Li-Ren expresses his gratitude and appreciation towards Zao for helping and caring for him previously although at the same time mentioned that Zao was somehow led astray in the midst of things. Li-Ren tells Zao that he won't be able to do anything now that Li-Ren has allowed Fi to be the Head of the Huangs. Li-Ren points a gun at Zao stating that both of them should wait whilst the Elders decide what to do with Li-Ren but as Zao was to command his personally hired bodyguards to his aid, Lieutenant Noei, sent by Rumaty to help Kajika, appears together with his comrades to save Li-Ren from being held captive in his mansion in Singapore. A great deal of damage was done to the Huang family's property but Noei told Zao to send the invoices to Rosenthal Corp as Carl Rosenthal had offered to pay for the losses. Eugene's personal helicopter then flew just outside Li-Ren 's balcony and Kajika opened the copter's door. She told Li-Ren to decide whether to stay on or follow her and he decides to follow Kajika. Kajika then told him that she'll not let go of Li-Ren. Toranosuke who was then maneuvering the helicopter asks Kajika where she is headed to next as there is a plane already waiting for her at the airport. She says that she wishes to go back to the Gibori Islands and Eugene was interested in following her. Li-Ren was slightly jealous and questioned Eugene's decision. Eugene naughtily told Li-Ren that he could get off his personal copter if he wasn't happy about it. The unhappy yet childish side of Li-Ren surfaced when he silently said to himself that he had a helicopter too. Kajika on the other hand was elated that both Li-Ren and Eugene(Mustafa) will be joining her in the Gibori Islands but she first told Toranosuke to head off to Raginei as she wants her dying grandfather, King Mahaty to meet her husband Li-Ren. Back in Raginei, both Harry Burnsworth and Rumaty have a good chat. Harry says that Kajika should be arriving soon and Rumaty was quite delighted at his uncle's optimism. Rumaty jokingly tells Harry that he is somewhat heartbroken and thought that he was the perfect match for Kajika. Harry tells Rumaty that he'll surely be able to find a lover this time and not a friend. Harry asks if he should introduce some gals to Rumaty and Rumaty keenly asked if Harry was planning on a Marriage game for him. It is then that the palace officials suddenly summon the presence of both Rumaty and Harry ...(probably alerting them of Kajika, Li-Ren, Toranosuke and Eugene's arrival). Later on, Kajika and Li-Ren are portrayed to be living blissfully in each other's embrace in Gibori.

== List of Specials ==
No.	Title	Original release date
12.5	"Toranosuke's Bodyguard Journal"	June 28, 2009
A recap of episodes 1–12 as told by Toranosuke.
25.5	"Zao's Raginei Super Secret File"	October 18, 2009
A recap of episodes 13–25 as told by Zao.

== DVD releases ==
A total of 13 DVD releases are set to be published by Studio Pierrot, each containing three episodes. The first was released in July 2009 and the last will be released in July 2010.

Japanese Hanasakeru Seishounen DVD Releases
Volume	Date	Episodes
Volume 1	July 31, 2009	1–3
Volume 2	August 28, 2009	4–6
Volume 3	September 25, 2009	7–9
Volume 4	October 30, 2009	10–12
Volume 5	November 27, 2009	13–15
Volume 6	December 25, 2009	16–18
Volume 7	January 29, 2010	19–21
Volume 8	February 26, 2010	22–24
Volume 9	March 26, 2010	25–27
Volume 10	April 23, 2010	28–30
Volume 11	May 28, 2010	31–33
Volume 12	June 25, 2010	34–36
Volume 13	July 30, 2010	37–39
