= List of Heavy Object episodes =

Heavy Object is a Japanese light novel series, written by Kazuma Kamachi and illustrated by Ryō Nagi. An anime television series adaptation by J.C. Staff was announced at the Dengeki Bunko Fall Festival event on October 5, 2014, and aired from October 2, 2015 to March 26, 2016. The first opening theme is "One More Chance!!" by ALL OFF and the first ending theme is "Dear Brave" by Kano while the second opening theme is "Never Gave Up" by ALL OFF and the second ending theme is "Strength to Change" by Yuka Iguchi.

== Episode list ==
No.	Title	Original release date
1	"The Little Soldiers Who Tie Down Gulliver / The Snowy Deep Winter Battle of Alaska I"; Transliteration: "Garibā o shibaru zōhyō-tachi 〜 Arasuka gokkan kankyō setsujō-sen Ichi 〜" (Japanese: ガリバーを縛る雑兵たち〜アラスカ極寒環境雪上戦I〜)	October 2, 2015
On a snowy outpost, Qwenthur Barbotage and Havia Winchell meet and befriend Milinda Brantini, the sole pilot of the giant war machine (also known as "Object") "Baby Magnum", unaware that their peaceful days on guard are about to end when the Faith Organization attacks.
2	"The Little Soldiers Who Tie Down Gulliver / The Snowy Deep Winter Battle of Alaska II"; Transliteration: "Garibā o shibaru zōhyō-tachi 〜 Arasuka gokkan kankyō setsujō-sen Ni 〜" (Japanese: ガリバーを縛る雑兵たち〜アラスカ極寒環境雪上戦II〜)	October 9, 2015
The base is attacked and Milinda's Baby Magnum is defeated by a more advanced and well equipped Object called the "Water Strider", forcing the rest of the military, led by Frolaytia Capistrano to retreat, while Milinda decides to stay behind and serve as a decoy. But Qwenthur refuses to abandon her and returns with Havia to aid her.
3	"The Little Soldiers Who Tie Down Gulliver / The Snowy Deep Winter Battle of Alaska III"; Transliteration: "Garibā o shibaru zōhyō-tachi 〜 Arasuka gokkan kankyō setsujō-sen San 〜" (Japanese: ガリバーを縛る雑兵たち〜アラスカ極寒環境雪上戦III〜)	October 16, 2015
Reunited with Milinda, Qwenthur and Havia infiltrate the enemy base looking for a way to disable the Water Strider and allow Frolaytia's forces to launch a counterattack, but things go south when Milinda is captured and it's up to Qwenthur to challenge all odds to make sure his plan works. He manages to sabotage the Water Strider's self destruct mechanism, causing it to explode and allowing Frolaytia to capture the enemy base. Qwenthur and Havia are hailed as heroes, and then are immediately transferred to a new front, much to their dismay.
4	"Tom Thumb Races Through the Oil Field / Battle to Blockade the Gibraltar I"; Transliteration: "Oyayubi Tomu wa yuden o hashiru 〜 Jiburarutaru tsūkō soshi-sen Ichi 〜" (Japanese: 親指トムは油田を走る〜ジブラルタル通行阻止戦I〜)	October 23, 2015
Because of the success of their escapades with the first Object, Qwenthur and Havia are transferred to the entrance of the Mediterranean to assist in combating another Object which has been drilling and selling oil to terrorists. After the Object attacks, they are able to infiltrate it and attach bombs to it, but they are unable to destroy it, until Milinda arrives in time for support.
5	"Tom Thumb Races Through the Oil Field / Battle to Blockade the Gibraltar II"; Transliteration: "Oyayubi Tomu wa yuden o hashiru 〜 Jiburarutaru tsūkō soshi-sen Ni 〜" (Japanese: 親指トムは油田を走る〜ジブラルタル通行阻止戦II〜)	October 30, 2015
With Milinda facing the hostile Object, Qwenthur and Havia's part in the battle seemed over, but the enemy Object begins systematically disabling Baby Magnum's weapons. Qwenthur uses a series of mines to damage the Object's rudders, causing it to break apart under the stress of its own high speed maneuvering.
6	"The War of the Ant and the Grasshopper / The Invasion of the Oceanian Military State I"; Transliteration: "Ari to kirigirisu no sensō 〜 Oseania gunji-koku kōryaku-sen Ichi 〜" (Japanese: 蟻とキリギリスの戦争〜オセアニア軍事国攻略戦I〜)	November 6, 2015
Qwenthur and co. are sent to a joint operation in Oceania with another Object from the Information Alliance. Milinda quickly grows jealous of Qwenthur's fascination with the rival Object and its pilot. Quenser and Havia are then sent to scout a jungle for enemies, and stumble across Oceanian soldiers massacring a village.
7	"The War of the Ant and the Grasshopper / The Invasion of the Oceanian Military State II"; Transliteration: "Ari to kirigirisu no sensō 〜 Oseania gunji-koku kōryaku-sen Ni 〜" (Japanese: 蟻とキリギリスの戦争〜オセアニア軍事国攻略戦II〜)	November 13, 2015
After defeating the Oceanian soldiers and stopping the massacre, Qwenthur and Havia learn from Froylatia that Oceania plans to use their Object to destroy more villages and frame the joint task force for the atrocities, thereby turning public favor against the joint operation. The joint task force heads off to the suspected hiding place of the Oceanian Object, but Qwenthur realizes that it is a decoy and deduces the Oceanian Object's true hiding place.
8	"The War of the Ant and the Grasshopper / The Invasion of the Oceanian Military State III"; Transliteration: "Ari to kirigirisu no sensō 〜 Oseania gunji-koku kōryaku-sen San 〜" (Japanese: 蟻とキリギリスの戦争〜オセアニア軍事国攻略戦III〜)	November 20, 2015
Qwenthur and Havia discovers the enemy's object's hideout. However, Councilor Flide, the commander of the joint task force, prevents them from calling in backup since his business interests are directly related with the outcome of the operation, and that Qwenthur and Havia's deaths will reaffirm Objects are the ultimate weapons. Despite the setback, Qwenthur and Havia manage to destroy the Oceanian Object by overloading its reactor. Qwenthur, Havia, Froylatia, and Milinda then head to Flide's headquarters and arrest Flide for his interference in the mission.
9	"In an Obstacle Course Race It's Normal to Get Covered in Mud / The Battle for Supremacy in Antarctica"; Transliteration: "Shōgaibutsu kyōsō nara futsū wa doro mamire 〜 Nankyoku tairiku seiatsu-sen 〜" (Japanese: 障害物競走なら普通は泥まみれ〜南極大陸制圧戦〜)	November 27, 2015
Qwenthur and Havia are sent to a reconnaissance mission in Antarctica and confront a terrorist force that has occupied a Legitimacy Kingdom research station. After Milinda destroys the sentry guns defending the outpost, the duo discover that the terrorists are attempting to hack a military satellite so they can fire its laser at a remote lunar resort. Since the target is a mutual enemy of the Legitimacy Kingdom, Froylatia orders them to allow the terrorists to fire the laser. Havia then finds out his fiancé is at the targeted resort and "accidentally" interrupts the hack, saving her life. Meanwhile, Milinda finds evidence of a submersible Object having recently been in the area.
9.5	"Special Edition ~ 37th Mobile Maintenance Battalion Strategy Record ~"; Transliteration: "Tokubetsu-hen 〜 Dai Sanjūnana kidō seibi daitai sakusen kiroku 〜" (Japanese: 特別編〜第37機動整備大隊作戦記録〜)	December 4, 2015
A recap of the previous episodes.
10	"Three Legged Mountain Climbing is Life and Death / The Artillery Battle in the Iguazu Mountains I"; Transliteration: "Ninin sankyaku tozan wa inochigake de 〜 Iguasu sangaku hōgeki-sen Ichi 〜" (Japanese: 二人三脚登山は命懸けで〜イグアス山岳砲撃戦I〜)	December 11, 2015
Qwenthur and Havia's unit is sent to intercept forces from the Mass Driver Conglomerate in the Iguazu region of South America. Meanwhile, Milinda receives an invitation for a "mock battle" against the Legitimacy Kingdom's newest Object, the Bright Hopper, under the implicit understanding that she deliberately lose against it. After Qwenthur and Havia land in Iguazu, they find no evidence of any Object. At the command center, Froylatia is contacted by Halreed, a high ranking noble and the pilot of the Bright Hopper, who requests that Froylatia allow him to defeat the enemy Object. In response, Froylatia orders Qwenthur and Havia to find and destroy the enemy Object before the Bright Hopper's arrival. Judging from their conversation, Havia theorizes that Froylatia and Halreed have some sort of personal connection to each other.
11	"Three Legged Mountain Climbing is Life and Death / The Artillery Battle in the Iguazu Mountains II"; Transliteration: "Ninin sankyaku tozan wa inochigake de 〜 Iguasu sangaku hōgeki-sen Ni 〜" (Japanese: 二人三脚登山は命懸けで〜イグアス山岳砲撃戦II〜)	December 18, 2015
The Bright Hopper is destroyed while en route to the battlefield by the Mass Driver Conglomerate's ultimate weapon, a railgun capable of firing artillery shells at a velocity of Mach 25. The MDC then attempts to target Baby Magnum, but thanks to a timely warning from Qwenthur, Milinda is barely able to dodge the attack, but Baby Magnum still suffers heavy damage. Meanwhile, the Bright Hopper's support forces arrive and announce that they plan to disable the MDC's Object by destroying a dam and flooding the entire Iguazu region, despite the fact that it would kill tens of thousands of civilians. Havia goes to stop the destruction of the dam while Qwenthur and Froylatia move to scout the enemy Object's (dubbed "Break Carrier") location. Froylatia then tells Qwenthur how she joined the military in order to avoid being forced into an arranged marriage, and that Halreed was one of her potential suitors. They then hear the Break Carrier approaching, but cannot pinpoint its location.
12	"Three Legged Mountain Climbing is Life and Death / The Artillery Battle in the Iguazu Mountains III"; Transliteration: "Ninin sankyaku tozan wa inochigake de 〜 Iguasu sangaku hōgeki-sen San 〜" (Japanese: 二人三脚登山は命懸けで〜イグアス山岳砲撃戦III〜)	December 25, 2015
Havia manages to delay the demolition dam while Qwenthur and Froylatia split up to find the Break Carrier. Qwenthur spots the Break Carrier and manages to signal its position to Milinda, who uses Baby Magnum's plasma cannon to fire straight through a mountain and destroy the Break Carrier. Victorious, Halreed's unit withdraws from the dam. However, Quenser suspects that the MDC may have a second Object that they have kept hidden. Halreed then contacts Froylatia announcing that he has been advanced to be the first place suitor, and attempts to force her out of the army to marry him. Qwenthur, on his own initiative, fools Halreed into believing that he has had an illicit relationship with Froylatia. Disgusted that Froylatia would sleep with a commoner, Halreed scraps his marriage plans, much to Froylatia's embarrassment and relief.
13	"In a Cavalry Battle, Knock Down the Foothold / The All-Out War in Amazon City I"; Transliteration: "Kibasen wa ashimoto o kuzusubeshi 〜 Amazon Shiti sōryoku-sen Ichi 〜" (Japanese: 騎馬戦は足元を崩すべし〜アマゾンシティ総力戦I〜)	January 8, 2016
With the Break Carrier destroyed, the Legitimate Kingdom pursues the remnants of the MDC to the abandoned Amazon City, where Qwenthur and Havia are given the mission to assassinate the MDC's leader, Sladder Honeysuckle. However, Qwenthur notices that the MDC is not trying to run, but instead trying to hole up in the city. The Capitalist Enterprise warns Froylatia that Honeysuckle is attempting to seek asylum with the Intelligence Union, and that the Intelligence Union is preparing to invade Amazon City to rescue him. Realizing that the Capitalist Enterprise will intervene to prevent Honeysuckle's escape, Froylatia orders her forces to accelerate their search to prevent a potential 4-way battle.
14	"In a Cavalry Battle, Knock Down the Foothold / The All-Out War in Amazon City II"; Transliteration: "Kibasen wa ashimoto o kuzusubeshi 〜 Amazon Shiti sōryoku-sen Ni 〜" (Japanese: 騎馬戦は足元を崩すべし〜アマゾンシティ総力戦II〜)	January 15, 2016
While pursuing Honeysuckle, Baby Magnum accidentally runs into a trap set by the MDC, forcing Milinda to eject and causing Qwenthur and Havia to be separated. Qwenthur finds himself in a duel with Honesuckle himself, who, like him, dreams of finding a way to destroy Objects without having to use another Object. Qwenthur manages to outsmart Honesuckle with clever bomb placement, and both he and Havia capture him. The Capitalist Enterprise and Intelligence Union call off their attacks, and Froylatia prepares to send the team to the next battlefield.
15	"The Graveyard of Junk is a Mountain of Rare Metals / Interception at the Site of the Alaska Battle I"; Transliteration: "Janku no haka wa reametaru no yama 〜 Arasuka senjō ato geigeki-sen Ichi 〜" (Japanese: ジャンクの墓はレアメタルの山〜アラスカ戦場跡迎撃戦I〜)	January 22, 2016
Qwenthur and Havia are sent back to Alaska in order to destroy the Water Strider's remains and prevent the Information Alliance from gathering any valuable data from it. Opposing them is the Elite codenamed "Ohoho", who battles Milinda, but both Objects disable each other. Qwenthur moves to sabotage Ohoho's Object by climbing aboard and breaking into the cockpit.
16	"The Graveyard of Junk is a Mountain of Rare Metals / Interception at the Site of the Alaska Battle II"; Transliteration: "Janku no haka wa reametaru no yama 〜 Arasuka senjō ato geigeki-sen Ni 〜" (Japanese: ジャンクの墓はレアメタルの山〜アラスカ戦場跡迎撃戦II〜)	January 29, 2016
Still surprised with Ohoho's true appearance, Qwenthur attempts to subdue her but she easily subdues him. Returning to the battle in a much better condition, Ohoho apparently gains the upper hand against Milinda, but Qwenthur uses his wits to send a coded message to Havia that instructs him to set a trap that brings the Rush's AI to a deadlock. Qwenthur then tricks Ohoho into believing that her superiors have activated the Rush's self destruct system, and allows her to eject and escape, leaving the Rush to be captured intact. However, Ohoho's superiors promise that her next Object will be far more powerful.
17	"The Coal Mine Littered with Stacks of Money / The Kamchatka Peninsula Nighttime Blitz I"; Transliteration: "Satsutaba no chirabaru tankō 〜 Kamuchakka hantō yakan kishū dengeki-sen Ichi 〜" (Japanese: 札束の散らばる炭鉱〜カムチャッカ半島夜間奇襲電撃戦I〜)	February 5, 2016
Qwenthur and Havia are tasked with assisting on an offensive against the Faith Organization's coal mines in Kamchatka. Qwenthur is tasked with leading a team to hack the Faith Organization's surveillance UAVs, allowing a team led by Havia to sabotage a radar facility and giving Milinda an edge over the Wing Balancer, the Object defending the mines. Accompanying Qwenthur's team is Charlotte Zoom, an oversight officer who is interested in Qwenthur. Unfortunately, before they can hack the UAVs, Nutsley, one of the team members, betrays them and shoots both Quenser and Charlotte in the back, leaving them for dead.
18	"The Coal Mine Littered with Stacks of Money / The Kamchatka Peninsula nighttime Blitz II"; Transliteration: "Satsutaba no chirabaru tankō 〜 Kamuchakka hantō yakan kishū dengeki-sen Ni 〜" (Japanese: 札束の散らばる炭鉱〜カムチャッカ半島夜間奇襲電撃戦II〜)	February 12, 2016
Qwenthur and Charlotte barely survive Nutsley's betrayal thanks to the heavy gear they were carrying on their backs. Meanwhile, Havia' team attempts to sabotage the Wing Balancer, but it is a failure and two members of Havia's team are apparently killed. Milinda engage the Wing Balancer in combat. Qwenthur and Havia reunite inside the mines, where they deduce that the coal mines are in fact diamond mines which are owned by an antiwar faction within the Faith Organization. They further deduce that the Faith Organization is attempting to trick the Legitimacy Kingdom into destroy the mines and the antiwar faction along with it. The group is then attacked by Nutsley, who is piloting a powered armor suit.
19	"The Coal Mine Littered with Stacks of Money / The Kamchatka Peninsula nighttime Blitz III"; Transliteration: "Satsutaba no chirabaru tankō 〜 Kamuchakka hantō yakan kishū dengeki-sen San 〜" (Japanese: 札束の散らばる炭鉱〜カムチャッカ半島夜間奇襲電撃戦III〜)	February 19, 2016
The group is rescued from Nutsley's attack by one of the antiwar civilians, and Qwenthur and Havia then lead Nutsley into a trap, killing him. Qwenthur then heads for the surface to witness the battle between Baby Magnum and Wing Balancer. Realizing that Wing Balancer requires delicate IR sensors to control its landings, Qwenthur uses an IR laser to disable one of the sensors, causing the Wing Balancer to land improperly and cripple itself and is subsequently destroyed by Baby Magnum. However, even with hostilities over, another Legitimate Kingdom Object, Indigo Plasma, arrive and destroys mines to eliminate the antiwar activists. Fortunately, Frolaytia managed to warn the activists in time for them to safely escape the mines. Qwenthur then realizes that Nutsley was not working for the Faith Organization, but for a radical faction of the Legitimate Kingdom. With Indigo Plasma's treachery, a civil war within the Legitimacy Kingdom is inevitable.
20	"You Can't Put a Price on Honor / The Critical Running Battle on Victoria Island I"; Transliteration: "Meiyo ni nedan wa tsuke rarenai 〜 Bikutoriatō kinkyū tsuigeki-sen Ichi 〜" (Japanese: 名誉に値段はつけられない〜ビクトリア島緊急追撃戦I〜)	February 26, 2016
The Legitimate Kingdom stages an operation at Victoria Island including Baby Magnum and two other Objects, Snow Quake and Active Sledge, to ambush Indigo Plasma and stop the man behind it, Prizewell City Slicker. As Indigo Plasma also uses infantry as part of its tactics, just like Qwenthur and Havia had assisted Baby Magnum on past occasions, several detachments were sent to assist on the mission. After helping to deal with an enemy platoon, Qwenthur and Havia discover that the soldiers are dispersing some sort of gas that triggers a massive explosion once ignited by the enemy Object's Plasma Cannons, putting both Baby Magnum and Snow Quake in a disadvantage. To make matters worse, the Legitimate Kingdom forces are informed that the Active Sledge is ambushed and sunk by six other Objects which appeared by surprise, and quickly regroup with Indigo Plasma, whose pilot, who is no other than City Slicker himself, demands them to surrender.
21	"You Can't Put a Price on Honor / The Critical Running Battle on Victoria Island II"; Transliteration: "Meiyo ni nedan wa tsuke rarenai 〜 Bikutoriatō kinkyū tsuigeki-sen Ni 〜" (Japanese: 名誉に値段はつけられない〜ビクトリア島緊急追撃戦II〜)	March 4, 2016
With Baby Magnum, Snow Quake, and Active Sledge disabled, City Slicker proceeds to lead his seven Objects to destroy a nearby immigrant city. Granny, fearing for her family that is living in the city, abandons her post to try and rescue them. Meanwhile, Qwenthur deduces that City Slicker's sick extra Objects are actually decoys, with inferior armor and run by an AI. Before he and Havia can do anything, they are captured by the Battlefield Cleaning Service, a Capitalist Enterprise private military company who are trapped on Victoria Island due to a failed operation. Qwenthur uses a stash of diamonds he stole from the Kamchatka mines to hire the Battlefield Cleaning Service to assist him in stopping City Slicker. They then contact Granny and tell her to return to her post and repair Baby Magnum, as they will handle the defense of the city.
22	"You Can't Put a Price on Honor / The Critical Running Battle on Victoria Island III"; Transliteration: "Meiyo ni nedan wa tsuke rarenai 〜 Bikutoriatō kinkyū tsuigeki-sen San 〜" (Japanese: 名誉に値段はつけられない〜ビクトリア島緊急追撃戦III〜)	March 11, 2016
With the Battlefield Cleaning Service's assistance, Qwenthur manages to stage a diversionary attack on City Slicker's Objects, damaging one of them and knocking off a piece of its armor. Upon analyzing the armor, and with assistance from Granny, Qwenthur discovers that dummy Objects are built out of a low cost ceramic material. Using a drone, Qwenthur takes advantage of the dummy Objects' faulty AI to trick them into firing on their own support convoy, setting off the volatile plasma gas they are carrying and inducing thermal shock on the dummy Objects' ceramic hulls, causing them to shatter. Milinda then arrives and destroys Indigo Plasma, killing City Slicker as well. Upon returning to base, Qwenthur finds out that the BCS is not a registered company under the Capitalist Enterprise. In fact, it turns out the BCS is a front for the Intelligence Union, who assisted Qwenthur in order to destroy the strategic AI technology the Legitimiate Kingdom stole from them.
23	"A Requiem for the Flowers Blooming in the Field / The Battle to Destroy the Baby Magnum I"; Transliteration: "Nonisakuhana ni chinkon no uta o 〜 Beibī Magunamu hakai-sen Ichi〜" (Japanese: 野に咲く花に鎮魂の歌を〜ベイビーマグナム破壊戦I〜)	March 18, 2016
Qwenthur and his unit are sent to oversee a hostage trade with the Intelligence Union, where they are sending Guru Klondike to them in return for valuable intelligence. Due to the importance of the Guru, the Capitalist Enterprise and Faith Organization send their own Objects to observe. However, Baby Magnum is hacked, and Qwenthur and Havia go to investigate the source when they are warned by Charlotte that Flide is responsible. They track down Flide's hideout, but fail to stop him from executing the Mirror of Truth program, which brainwashes Milinda into aggressively attacking anything she considers a threat. Flide explains that he is doing this both as revenge against Qwenthur as well as provoking a full scale world war between the four powers. Flide then has the brainwashed Milinda bombard his own hideout, killing himself and erasing the evidence of the hack. Milinda then attacks Ohoho's new Rush, provoking a major battle between the two as Qwenthur tries to figure out a way to stop her.
24	"A Requiem for the Flowers Blooming in the Field / The Battle to Destroy the Baby Magnum II"; Transliteration: "Nonisakuhana ni chinkon no uta o 〜 Beibī Magunamu hakai-sen Ni 〜" (Japanese: 野に咲く花に鎮魂の歌を〜ベイビーマグナム破壊戦II〜)	March 26, 2016
While trying to stop Milinda, Qwenthur and Havia's vehicle is hit by stray fire, leaving Qwenthur critically wounded. They are both recovered by the Intelligence Union and have their wounds treated. Qwenthur then warns them about the Mirror of Truth, and convinces Ohoho to help him save Milinda. Frolaytia warns Qwenthur that her superiors have declared that the Baby Magnum has gone rogue, and will allow the Faith Organization and Capital Enterprise Objects to intervene to destroy it. Needing to find a way to deal enough damage to Baby Magnum to force Milinda to eject while at the same time not completely destroying it, Qwenthur lures Baby Magnum into the line of fire of one of Baby Magnum's spare cannons, which fires a shell full of CVD particles. The particles foul the barrels of Baby Magnum's cannons, causing them to explode and forcing Milinda to eject, breaking the brainwashing on her. Afterwards, Milinda parachuted to safety and tells Qwenthur and Havia to go on vacation together. However, Honeysuckle warns Charlotte that the organization that targeted Qwenthur will only see him as a bigger threat to their plans now.
