= // =

Two slashes (//) are:

== Computing ==
- The prefix for a line comment in C-family computer languages
- The root directory in the Domain/OS Shell — see Path (computing) § Summary of systems
- The operator for integer division, in Python 2.2+ and other programming languages
- An empty regular expression, in ed-style syntax
- The logical defined-or (null coalescing) operator in Perl
- The prefix for the authority component of a Uniform Resource Identifier (URI) — always preceded by a colon, as in scheme://authority…
- The abbreviated syntax for the "descendant-or-self" axis specifier in XPath

== Mathematics ==
- Historically used to express ratio by Nicolo Tartaglia

== Other uses ==
- 𝄓, a caesura in musical notation
- ⫽, the prefix and suffix for a diaphoneme in linguistic transcription
- ⫽, Unicode character U+2AFD DOUBLE SOLIDUS OPERATOR, in Supplemental Mathematical Operators
- ◌⃫, Unicode character U+20EB COMBINING LONG DOUBLE SOLIDUS OVERLAY, in Combining Diacritical Marks for Symbols

== See also ==
- / (disambiguation)
  - Slash (punctuation)
- Vertical bar (disambiguation), for "‖" stylized in pseudo-italics
- \\ (disambiguation)
- /\ (disambiguation)
- \/ (disambiguation)
- /r/ (disambiguation)
- (///), the logo of TV Rain, an independent Russian-language television channel
- - :///CODENAME: dustsucker, 2004 album by Bark Psychosis
  - (///M), the logo of BMW M GmbH, a manufacturer of high-performance luxury cars
  - /// Cheers!, a publication by the Apple Pugetsound Program Library Exchange (A.P.P.L.E.)
  - "//aguardiente y limón %ᵕ‿‿ᵕ%", a song by Kali Uchis on Sin Miedo (del Amor y Otros Demonios), 2020
  - //build/, an annual conference event held by Microsoft
  - //Khara Hais Local Municipality (merged 2016), in the Northern Cape province of South Africa
  - ://Neuromance, 2005 album by Dope Stars Inc.
- EUPHORIC /// HEARTBREAK \\\, 2011 album by Glasvegas
- Dreaming Is Sinking /// Waking Is Rising, 2017 album by Dayseeker
- IN///PARALLEL, 2017 album by Dhani Harrison
- Apple ///, a personal computer model
- ht://Dig, an indexing and searching system
- The Unexplored Summon://Blood-Sign (Japanese: 未踏召喚://ブラッドサイン), 2014–2019 Japanese light novel series written by Kazuma Kamachi and illustrated by Waki Ikawa
- .hack//Sign, 2002 Japanese anime television series
  - .hack, the franchise based on it, consisting of various works starting with ".hack//"
- Pärnu maantee 36 // Roosikrantsi 23, a mixed-use building in Estonia
- Lello//Arnell, a collaborative duo of artists Jørgen Craig Lello and Tobias Arnell
- Blitz//Berlin, a trio of Canadian composers based in California
- Yamantaka // Sonic Titan, a Canadian experimental music and performance art collective
- Girl Walk // All Day, 2011 dance music video directed by Jacob Krupnick
- "Finally // Beautiful Stranger", 2019 single by Halsey, from Manic
- "Blood // Water", 2017 single by Grandson, from A Modern Tragedy Vol. 1
- Pompeii // Utility, 2026 album by Earl Sweatshirt, Mike, and Surf Gang
- Primeval: Obsession // Detachment, 2025 album by Tallah
- Past // Present // Future, 2023 album by Meet Me at the Altar
- Prey//IV, 2022 album by Alice Glass
- Lost Forever // Lost Together, 2014 album by Architects
- Flourish // Perish, 2013 album by Braids
- Invisible Empire // Crescent Moon, 2013 album by KT Tunstall
- Warrior // Worrier, 2012 album by Outlandish
- YT//ST, 2011 album by Yamantaka // Sonic Titan
- Health//Disco, 2008 album by Health
- Amplified // A Decade of Reinventing the Cello, 2006 album by Apocalyptica
- My Passion // Your Pain, 2003 album by Callenish Circle
- strange haircuts // cardboard guitars // and computer samples, 2001 album by Information Society
