= Di Lello =

Di Lello or DiLello may refer to:

- Alessandro Di Lello (born 1977), Italian Paralympic athlete
- Ed Di Lello (born 1952), American composer, choreographer, director, dancer and actor
- Luigi Di Lello (born 1968), Italian male marathon runner
- Mauro Di Lello (born 1978), professional footballer
- Richard DiLello, author of the 1973 rock history book The Longest Cocktail Party

== See also ==
- Lello (disambiguation)
