= Lello =

Lello is a surname. It may refer to:

== Given name ==
- Lello Arena (born 1953) Italian actor, comedian and television personality
- Lello da Orvieto (1315–1340), Italian painter and mosaicist
- Lello Voce (born 1957), Italian poet, writer and journalist

== Surname ==
- Christopher Lello (born 1971), English cricketer
- Cyril Lello (1921–1997), English footballer
- Henry Lello (fl. late 16th–early 17th century), English diplomat, warden of the Fleet Prison, and Keeper of the Palace of Westminster

== See also ==
- LELLO//ARNELL, a Norwegian/Swedish collaborative artistic duo
- Livraria Lello, a Portuguese bookstore
