= Kazuma Kamachi =

Pen name of the creator of A Certain Magical Index franchise

- Occupation: Author
- Writing career
- Pen name: Kazuma Kamachi (鎌池和馬, Kamachi Kazuma)
- Language: Japanese
- Period: April 2004–present
- Genres: Light novel, manga
- Notable works: A Certain Magical Index; A Certain Scientific Railgun; A Certain Scientific Accelerator; Heavy Object
- Website: dengekibunko.jp/author/kamachikazuma/

Kazuma Kamachi (鎌池和馬, Kamachi Kazuma) is the pen name of a Japanese author who has published over 100 light novel volumes. He is best known for the creation of the A Certain Magical Index franchise which, as of 2019, has sold over 30 million copies worldwide and has been licensed in North America by Yen Press with the first novel being released in Q4 2014.

== Career ==
Kazuma Kamachi has stated that ever since he was a child, he had always wanted to become a novelist, spending his student days in trying to achieve this dream. However, his intention was never to become a popular writer. From the time he was in junior high school, bit-by-bit he started writing, but it was not until he graduated from high school that he ever completed any of his work.

Kamachi submitted his novel Schrödinger's Machi (シュレディンガーの街) to the 9th Dengeki Game Novel Prize, but it was rejected in the third round. Despite this, his work caught the attention of editor-in-charge of the award, Kazuma Miki, who offered him a chance to write another work. For around a year, Kamachi exchanged and discussed prototype stories with Miki, and made his debut with A Certain Magical Index in April 2004 after 6 or 7 revisions. The initial volume was written as a complete story in case that it would not sell; however, after selling well, it was decided that it would become a series. A Certain Magical Index would soon be adapted to a manga, then to an anime, a movie, games, etc. Thus turning into an extremely popular franchise. This, in turn, led to the series breaking many Dengeki Bunko, the series' publisher, records, such as being the first series to have 1, 2, and then 3 million copies in circulation. In April 2016, Kamachi signed a contract to write for Kazuma Miki's new company Straight Edge Inc. On July 10, 2020, he became the first Dengeki writer to have published 100 volumes under their label.

He states that many of his pre-debut works, including the prototypes he sent to Miki, remain stored away at his house.

== Personal life ==
Not much is known about Kazuma Kamachi's personal life, which is also true for other light novel authors in Japan. As an author, he is known for his consistent output in writing his books, releasing at least 3 per year. Starting in December 2014, Kazuma has been releasing novels monthly in 4 different titles while working on 3 different manga titles.

Kazuma Miki, editor of the A Certain Magical Index series, released a book and a chapter named Kamachi Kazuma the Legend which confirms as well as debunks rumors about him and talks about him.

== Works ==
=== Novels ===
Light novels by Kazuma Kamachi
Title	Year(s)	Volumes	Ref.
A Certain Magical Index とある魔術の禁書目録(インデックス) Toaru Majutsu no Index	2004–2010	24	
Heavy Object ヘヴィーオブジェクト	2009–2021	20	
A Certain Magical Index: New Testament 新約 とある魔術の禁書目録(インデックス) Shin'yaku Toaru Majutsu no Index	2011–2019	23	
Intellectual Village no Zashiki Warashi インテリビレッジの座敷童 (lit. "The Zashiki Warashi of Intellectual Village")	2012–2015	9	
Kantan na Enquete desu 簡単なアンケートです (lit. "A Simple Survey")	2012	1	
Waltraute-san no Konkatsu Jijou ヴァルトラウテさんの婚活事情 (lit. "The Circumstances Leading to Waltraute's Marriage")	2012	1	
Kantan na Monitor desu 簡単なモニターです (lit. "A Simple Monitoring")	2013	1	
The Unexplored Summon://Blood-Sign 未踏召喚://ブラッドサイン Mitou Shoukan://Blood Sign	2014–2019	10	
Toaru Majutsu no Heavy na Zashiki-warashi ga Kantan na Satsujinki no Konkatsu Jijou とある魔術のへヴィーな座敷童が簡単な殺人妃の婚活事情 (lit. "A Certain Magical Heavy Zashiki-Warashi Deals With a Simple Killer Princess' Marriage Circumstances")	2015	1	
Saikyou wo Kojiraseta Level Counter Stop Kenseijo Beatrice no Jakuten Sono Na wa "Buu Buu" 最強をこじらせたレベルカンスト剣聖女ベアトリーチェの弱点 その名は「ぶーぶー」 (lit. "The Weakness of Beatrice the Level Cap Holy Swordswoman That Made Being the Strongest Even More Trouble – His Name? Boo Boo ")	2016–2019	7	
Magistellus Bad Trip マギステルス・バッドトリップ	2019–2020	3	
Apocalypse Witch アポカリプス・ウィッチ	2019–2022	5	
A Certain Magical Index: Genesis Testament 創約 とある魔術の禁書目録(インデックス) Souyaku Toaru Majutsu no Index	2020–present	15	
Shin Kaku Gi Kou to 11-nin no Hakaisha 神角技巧と11人の破壊者 Godhorn Tech and the 11 Destroyers	2021	3	
A Certain Dark Item とある暗部の少女共棲(アイテム) Toaru Anbu no Shōjo Kyōsei (Aitemu)	2023	6	

=== Manga ===
Manga by Kazuma Kamachi
Title	Year(s)	Volumes	Ref.
A Certain Scientific Railgun とある科学の超電磁砲(レールガン) Toaru Kagaku no Rērugan	2007–2026	21	
A Certain Magical Index とある魔術の禁書目録(インデックス) Toaru Majutsu no Indekkusu	2007–present	31	
Heavy Object ヘヴィーオブジェクト	2009–2011	1	
Heavy Object S ヘヴィーオブジェクトS	2011–2013	3	
A Certain Magical Index: Endymion's Miracle とある魔術の禁書目録 エンデュミオンの奇蹟 Toaru Majutsu no Indekkusu: Endymion no Kiseki	2013	2	
A Certain Everyday Index-san とある日常のいんでっくすさん Toaru Nichijō no Indekkusu-san	2013–2016	5	
A Certain Scientific Accelerator とある科学の一方通行(アクセラレータ) Toaru Kagaku no Akuserarēta	2013–2020	12	
Heavy Object A ヘヴィーオブジェクトA	2015–2016	3	
A Certain Idol Accelerator-sama とある偶像(アイドル)の一方通行(アクセラレータ)さま Toaru Gūzō no Ippō Tsūkō-sama	2015–2018	4	
A Certain Scientific Railgun: Astral Buddy とある科学の超電磁砲(レールガン)外伝 アストラル・バディ Toaru Kagaku no Rērugan Gaiden: Asutoraru Badi	2017–2020	4	
A Certain Scientific Dark Matter とある科学の未元物質(ダークマター) Toaru Kagaku no Dāku Matā	2019–2020	1	
A Certain Scientific Mental Out とある科学の心理掌握(メンタルアウト) Toaru Kagaku no Mentaru Auto	2021–present	4	

=== Film ===
Film by Kazuma Kamachi
Title	Year	Role	Ref.
A Certain Magical Index: The Movie – The Miracle of Endymion 劇場版 とある魔術の禁書目録 エンデュミオンの奇蹟 Gekijōban Toaru Majutsu no Indekkusu: Endyumion no Kiseki	2013	story writer	

=== Video games ===
Video games by Kazuma Kamachi
Title	Year	Platform	Role	Ref.
Kakusansei Million Arthur 拡散性ミリオンアーサー	2011	Android, iOS	scenario writer	
A Certain Magical Index とある魔術の禁書目録(インデックス) Toaru Majutsu no Index	2011	PlayStation Portable	story writer	
A Certain Scientific Railgun とある科学の超電磁砲(レールガン) Toaru Kagaku no Rērugan	2011	PlayStation Portable	story writer	
A Certain Magical Index: Struggle Battle 拡散性ミリオンアーサー Toaru Majutsu no Index Struggle Battle	2012	Android, iOS	story writer	
Toaru Majutsu to Kagaku no Ensemble とある魔術と科学の群奏活劇(アンサンブル) (lit. "A Certain Magical and Scientific Ensemble")	2013	PlayStation Portable	story writer	
Kairisei Million Arthur 拡散性ミリオンアーサー	2016	Android, iOS; PS4, PS Vita	scenario writer	

== Awards ==
- Kono Light Novel ga Sugoi!
  - 2009 - 4th Place in Best Novel Series, A Certain Magical Index
  - 2010 - 9th Place in Best Novel Series, A Certain Magical Index
  - 2011 - 1st Place in Best Novel Series, A Certain Magical Index
  - 2012 - 2nd Place in Best Novel Series, A Certain Magical Index
  - 2013 - 2nd Place in Best Novel Series, A Certain Magical Index
  - 2014 - 3rd Place in Best Novel Series, A Certain Magical Index
  - 2015 - 4th Place in Best Novel Series, A Certain Magical Index
  - 2016 - 7th Place in Best Novel Series, A Certain Magical Index
  - 2017 - 3rd Place in Best Novel Series, A Certain Magical Index
  - 2019 - 9th Place in Best Novel Series, A Certain Magical Index
