= A Certain Scientific Accelerator =

Japanese manga series

- Cover of the first volume featuring Accelerator (top) and Last Order (bottom)

とある科学の一方通行(アクセラレータ) (Toaru Kagaku no Akuserarēta)
- Genre: Science fiction, supernatural
- Manga
- Written by: Kazuma Kamachi
- Illustrated by: Arata Yamaji
- Published by: ASCII Media Works
- English publisher: NA: Seven Seas Entertainment
- Magazine: Dengeki Daioh
- Original run: December 27, 2013 – July 27, 2020
- Volumes: 12
- Manga

A Certain Idol Accelerator-sama
- Written by: Kazuma Kamachi
- Illustrated by: Teto Tachitsu
- Published by: ASCII Media Works
- Magazine: Dengeki Daioh
- Original run: October 27, 2015 – November 27, 2018
- Volumes: 4
- Anime television series
- Directed by: Nobuharu Kamanaka
- Produced by: Kazuma Miki; Kenji Tsuji; Yūichirō Shiji; Kentarō Hattori; Takehiro Nakakura; Michihisa Abe; Kozue Kananiwa; Noritomo Isogai
- Written by: Kenji Sugihara
- Music by: Maiko Iuchi
- Studio: J.C.Staff
- Licensed by: Crunchyroll (Note: In North America through Crunchyroll, LLC (formerly known as Funimation)); IN: Netflix (streaming); SEA: Muse Communication
- Original network: AT-X, BS11, MBS, Tokyo MX
- Original run: July 12, 2019 – September 27, 2019
- Episodes: 12

A Certain Scientific Accelerator (Japanese: とある科学の一方通行(アクセラレータ), Hepburn: Toaru Kagaku no Akuserarēta) (Note: The official full title is A Certain Magical Index Side Story: A Certain Scientific Accelerator (とある魔術の禁書目録(インデックス)外伝 一方通行(アクセラレータ), Toaru Majutsu no Indekkusu Gaiden: Toaru Kagaku no Akuserarēta)) is a Japanese manga series written by Kazuma Kamachi and illustrated by Arata Yamaji. It is a spin-off of A Certain Magical Index light novel series, which focuses on Academy City's most powerful Level 5 esper named Accelerator. The manga was serialized by ASCII Media Works through their monthly magazine Dengeki Daioh from December 2013 to July 2020 and published in English by Seven Seas Entertainment. Kamachi and Teto Tachitsu wrote and illustrated its manga spin-off titled A Certain Idol Accelerator-sama, which was published from October 2015 to November 2018. An anime television series adaptation by J.C.Staff aired from July 12 to September 27, 2019.

== Plot ==
After protecting Last Order at the cost of much of his power, Accelerator now finds himself dragged into a new conflict in the form of an organization called Disciplinary Action which plots to use Last Order for a dangerous mission. Now that they have set their plan into motion and are in pursuit of the young girl, it is up to the world's most powerful esper and his newfound companion, Esther Rosenthal, to protect Last Order and defend Academy City in the process.

== Media ==
=== Manga ===
The October 2013 issue of Dengeki Daioh magazine announced a manga spin-off of A Certain Magical Index series to be written by Kazuma Kamachi and illustrated by Arata Yamaji and Kiyotaka Haimura, which began serialization in the magazine's February 2014 issue on December 27, 2013. On March 25, 2015, Seven Seas Entertainment announced the English publication of A Certain Scientific Accelerator in North America. The manga concluded in the September issue of Dengeki Daioh on July 27, 2020.

No.	Original release date	Original ISBN	English release date	English ISBN
1	July 26, 2014	978-4-04-866702-9	October 27, 2015	978-1-626921-86-3
Chapters 1–3
2	November 27, 2014	978-4-04-866988-7	January 5, 2016	978-1-626922-28-0
Chapters 4–8
3	April 27, 2015	978-4-04-869345-5	May 31, 2016	978-1-626922-64-8
Chapters 9–13
4	October 27, 2015	978-4-04-865430-2	October 25, 2016	978-1-626923-37-9
Chapters 14–18
5	May 27, 2016	978-4-04-892121-3	March 7, 2017	978-1-626924-35-2
Chapters 19–24
6	November 26, 2016	978-4-04-892430-6	August 29, 2017	978-1-626925-10-6
Chapters 25–30
7	August 26, 2017	978-4-04-892917-2	January 16, 2018	978-1-626926-68-4
Chapters 31–37
8	March 24, 2018	978-4-04-893719-1	February 12, 2019	978-1-626928-22-0
Chapters 38–43
9	October 11, 2018	978-4-04-912054-7	June 18, 2019	978-1-642750-88-1
Chapters 44–48
10	June 26, 2019	978-4-04-912586-3	April 28, 2020	978-1-642757-33-0
Chapters 49–52
11	March 26, 2020	978-4-04-913114-7	December 1, 2020	978-1-64505-449-8
Chapters 53–58
12	August 27, 2020	978-4-04-913394-3	June 8, 2021	978-1-64505-827-4
Chapters 59–61

==== Spin-off ====
A four-panel comedy manga spin-off of the series written by Kamachi and illustrated by Teto Tachitsu, titled A Certain Idol Accelerator-sama (とある偶像(アイドル)の一方通行(アクセラレータ)さま, Toaru Gūzō no Ippō Tsūkō-sama), was serialized in Dengeki Daioh from October 27, 2015, to November 27, 2018. It focuses on Accelerator's career as an idol, along with other Level 5 espers.

No.	Japanese release date	Japanese ISBN
1	November 26, 2016	978-4-04-892363-7
Chapters 1–10
2	August 26, 2017	978-4-04-892916-5
Chapters 11–19
3	March 24, 2018	978-4-04-893715-3
Chapters 20–29
4	December 25, 2018	978-4-04-912240-4
Chapters 30–39

=== Anime ===
Logo for the anime

In October 2018, an anime television series adaptation of A Certain Scientific Accelerator was announced. The anime series is produced by J.C.Staff and directed by Nobuharu Kamanaka, with Kenji Sugihara handling series composition and Yohei Yaegashi designing the characters. Maiko Iuchi, the composer of A Certain Magical Index and A Certain Scientific Railgun, was confirmed in March 2019 to be composing the series. The Sixth Lie and Sajou no Hana performed the opening and ending theme music titled "Shadow is the Light" and "Parole", respectively. Twelve episodes were aired in Japan on AT-X, Tokyo MX, BS11, and MBS from July 12 to September 27, 2019. The first Blu-ray and DVD volumes of the series were published on October 30, 2019, followed by the second and final volumes on December 25, and February 28, 2020.

Crunchyroll streamed the series worldwide outside of Asia beginning July 12, 2019, while Muse Communication began distributing it on their Muse Asia YouTube channel on the same date. Funimation streamed the series in the United States, Canada, the United Kingdom, Ireland, Australia, and New Zealand with an English dub beginning July 26, 2019, and Netflix released it in India on September 1, 2020. The series was released on Hulu in Japan on March 24, 2022.

==== Episodes ====
No.	Title	Directed by	Written by	Storyboarded by	Original release date
1	"Accelerator (Academy City's Mightiest Esper)"; Transliteration: "Akuserarēta (Gakuentoshi Saikyō Nōryoku-sha)" (Japanese: 学園都市最強能力者(アクセラレータ))	Nobuharu Kamanaka	Kenji Sugihara	Nobuharu Kamanaka	July 12, 2019
An ultra-high-pressure experimental water cutter weapon is stolen in a secret research facility at District 4 in Academy City. Later, three high school students, Yōko Takada, Minori Kidera, and Hiromi Nakahara, assault the hospital at District 7, where Accelerator is confined, using the stolen weapon to obtain his genetic data and sell it to the highest bidder. Hiromi is knocked down by Accelerator's attack, while Yōko and Minori retreat after they stole Last Order's gift containing his blood that accidentally dropped from his open wound. Accelerator manages to stop them and retrieve the gift to return it to Last Order. In a post-credits scene, a hooded woman is observing the hospital afar with a picture of Last Order.
2	"Necromancer (Raiser of the Dead)"; Transliteration: "Nekuromansā (Shiryō Jutsu-shi)" (Japanese: 死霊術師(ネクロマンサー))	Nobuharu Kamanaka	Kenji Sugihara	Nobuharu Kamanaka	July 19, 2019
Three days ago, a suicidal student named Hasami Hitokawa was rescued by Anti-Skills, who introduced themselves as from DA, but later got killed by them to use her dead body for an experimental weapon. In the present, the hooded woman flees from pursuing DA operatives and enters Accelerator's room in the hospital. She later gets apprehended and drops the picture of Last Order, which Accelerator noticed. Accelerator confronts the DA operatives and destroys the experimental machine, known as Coffin, that they launched against him, which contained Hasami's dead body. Aiho Yomikawa and her Anti-Skill unit arrive at the scene, and she denies knowledge of DA's existence. Accelerator encounters the hooded woman introducing herself as Esther Rosenthal and learns about the machine's purpose of controlling the dead. Esther seeks his help to stop the individuals she taught about necromancy as they plan to use Last Order.
3	"Numbers (Charms of the Four Perils)"; Transliteration: "Nanbāzu (Shikyō no Fu)" (Japanese: 四凶の符(ナンバーズ))	Tsuneo Tominaga	Asami Ishikawa	Nobuharu Kamanaka	July 26, 2019
Accelerator and Esther arrive in a warehouse where she used to be imprisoned and encounter Qiong Qi, a Coffin operated by Mikihiko Hishigata which uses one of the Rosenthal family's charms that are part of the artificial souls called Numbers. Mikihiko retreats after a scuffle between him and Accelerator. Accelerator and Esther return to the hospital and later bond with Last Order in a restaurant. Afterward, Heaven Canceller visits them and presents a charm he retrieved from Hasami's corpse. Esther brings Accelerator to the morgue and summons a pseudo-soul called Huotō to close Hasami's open spiritual circuit and lay her rest properly. Two DA operatives arrive and attempt to dissolve the corpse with a solution, but they are stopped by Accelerator.
4	"Third Number (The Pseudo-Soul, Huotou)"; Transliteration: "Sādo Nanbā (Giji Konpaku・Wazawai to)" (Japanese: 擬似魂魄・禍斗(サードナンバー))	Hiroaki Takagi	Noboru Takagi	Hiroaki Takagi	August 2, 2019
Huotō possesses Hasami's corpse and helps Accelerator in dealing with the DA operatives. One of them escapes and takes Misaka #10046 hostage. Kazari Uiharu and Ruiko Saten discuss an urban legend about a train that continues to run without stopping at any station, which revealed to be the mobile hideout of one of Academy City's Board of Directors named Rizō Nakimoto. Rizō contacts the liaison of the dark side organization Scavenger to have them eradicate DA due to their recent actions causing a nuisance. Meanwhile, Accelerator regains consciousness after his fight with DA and receives a call from Kikyō Yoshikawa about her findings of the organization. A Misaka clone visits Accelerator to give him a letter from Esther telling him that they are pursuing the DA hostage-taker and informs him about the abduction of Misaka #10046. Meanwhile, the Scavengers destroy a warehouse in District 3 where DA's hideout is located.
5	"DA (Security Officer Darkness)"; Transliteration: "Dī-Ā (Anchisukiru no Yami)" (Japanese: 警備員の闇(DA))	Tsuneo Tominaga	Masaharu Amiya	Takashi Watanabe	August 9, 2019
Anti-Skills raid a supplement factory, where DA used it as their hideout, and outnumber them, but DA manages to counter-attack with their Tarantula machine. During the fight, Aiho notices a group of DA retreating with a body bag containing Misaka #10046 and stops them. The Scavengers arrive at the scene and disable the machine with the help of Tarōmaru Seike's ability to manipulate friction coefficients, while Esther and Huotō rescue Misaka #10046 from falling to the ground. Meanwhile, Accelerator exits the hospital with a recently-charged choker to rescue the abducted Misaka clone.
6	"Scavenger (Corpse-Eating Squad)"; Transliteration: "Sukabenjā (Shikabane-Cān Butai)" (Japanese: 屍喰部隊(スカベンジャー))	Hiroaki Takagi	Masaharu Amiya	Hiroaki Takagi	August 16, 2019
One of the Scavenger operatives named Naruha Sakuragi fights Huotō and overwhelms her with her ability to manipulate paper into shapes and sizes. Accelerator arrives before Naruha finishes off Huotō. Rita Īzumi, the leader of the Scavengers, soon realizes that they are fighting the ranked-one Level 5 esper of Academy City after hearing his name from Esther. Accelerator defeats the rest of the Scavengers.
7	"Download (Time Limit)"; Transliteration: "Daunrōdo (Seigen Jikan)" (Japanese: 制限時間(ダウンロード))	Taiji Kawanishi	Kenji Sugihara	Hidefumi Kimura	August 23, 2019
After the fight, Esther commends Accelerator for not killing the Scavengers despite his great power and offers herself to be his student, while a mysterious woman watches them through a surveillance camera. They later encounter three Coffins operated by the mysterious woman, revealed to be Mikihiko's younger sister named Hirumi. The machines successfully abduct Misaka #10046, making Accelerator to pursue them. Esther reveals to Aiho her involvement with Mikihiko and the Coffins through necromancy. Meanwhile, Mikihiko begins downloading the memories of the 10,031 dead Misaka clones from Misaka #10046 as he taunts Accelerator for his past involvement in the Level 6 Shift Project, while Esther and Huotō arrive in an abandoned building to help Accelerator in her own way.
8	"Friend (Hirumi)"; Transliteration: "Furendo (Hirumi)" (Japanese: 蛭魅(フレンド))	Tsuneo Tominaga	Tsuyoshi Tamai	Nobuharu Kamanaka	August 30, 2019
9	"Memory of Death (10031 Deaths)"; Transliteration: "Memorī obu Desu (Ichiman Sanjūichi-gō Kai no Shi)" (Japanese: 10031回の死(メモリー オブ デス))	Hidekazu Satō	Masaharu Amiya	Takashi Watanabe	September 6, 2019
10	"Catastrophe (Awakening)"; Transliteration: "Katasutorofu (Mezame)" (Japanese: 目覚め(カタストロフ))	Shigeki Awai	Kenji Sugihara	Takashi Watanabe	September 13, 2019
11	"Perfect Golem (Perfect Body)"; Transliteration: "Pāfekuto Goremu (Kanzen Karada)" (Japanese: 完全体(パーフェクトゴレム))	Tsuneo Tominaga	Tsuyoshi Tamai	Takashi Watanabe	September 20, 2019
12	"Something to Protect"; Transliteration: "Mamoru-beki Mono" (Japanese: まもるべきもの)	Hiroaki Takagi & Tsuneo Tominaga	Tsuyoshi Tamai	Takashi Watanabe & Nobuharu Kamanaka	September 27, 2019

== Reception ==
=== Sales ===
The first volume of A Certain Scientific Accelerator sold 39,039 copies in the first week of its release, ranking 27th behind Kuroko's Basketball, and 54,093 copies in the second week, coming in twelfth.

=== Critical response ===
Evan Minto of Otaku USA found A Certain Scientific Accelerator lacking an "establishing exposition" and noted its "confusing starting point" but commended Yamaji's "comfortable" handling of action scenes.

Theron Martin of Anime News Network rated the first episode of the series' anime adaptation 4 out of 5 stars, describing the overall production "at least... impressive" despite his concerns with Kamanaka and Sugihara due to their previous works and the show a "sharp enough addition to the franchise that... should not disappoint any established fan of the franchise".
