= Heavy Object =

Japanese light novel series

- First light novel volume cover, featuring Milinda Brantini

ヘヴィーオブジェクト (Hevī Obujekuto)
- Created by: Kazuma Kamachi
- Light novel
- Written by: Kazuma Kamachi
- Illustrated by: Ryō Nagi
- Published by: ASCII Media Works
- Imprint: Dengeki Bunko
- Original run: October 10, 2009 – October 8, 2021
- Volumes: 20
- Manga
- Written by: Kazuma Kamachi
- Illustrated by: Shinsuke Inue
- Published by: ASCII Media Works
- Magazine: Dengeki Black Maoh; Dengeki Maoh
- Original run: December 17, 2009 – February 26, 2011
- Volumes: 1
- Manga

Heavy Object S
- Written by: Kazuma Kamachi
- Illustrated by: Sakae Saitō
- Published by: ASCII Media Works
- Magazine: Dengeki Maoh
- Original run: December 27, 2011 – June 27, 2013
- Volumes: 3
- Manga

Heavy Object A
- Written by: Kazuma Kamachi
- Illustrated by: Sakae Saitō
- Published by: ASCII Media Works
- Magazine: Dengeki Maoh
- Original run: February 27, 2015 – October 27, 2016
- Volumes: 3
- Anime television series
- Directed by: Takashi Watanabe
- Written by: Hiroyuki Yoshino
- Music by: Maiko Iuchi; Keiji Inai
- Studio: J.C.Staff; Sanzigen (3DCG)
- Licensed by: Crunchyroll: BI: Anime Limited (expired); SEA: Muse Communication
- Original network: Tokyo MX, MBS, TVA, BS11, AT-X, NTV
- Original run: October 2, 2015 – March 25, 2016
- Episodes: 24
- icon

Heavy Object (Japanese: ヘヴィーオブジェクト, Hepburn: Hevī Obujekuto) is a Japanese light novel series written by Kazuma Kamachi and illustrated by Ryō Nagi. ASCII Media Works published the series in twenty volumes from 2009 to 2021 under their Dengeki Bunko label. It has received three manga adaptations. A 24-episode anime television series adaptation produced by J.C.Staff (with 3DCG provided by Sanzigen) aired from October 2015 to March 2016.

== Plot ==
In the future, the development of massive war machines with spherical main bodies called Objects, due to their firepower and, most important of all, their integrity, have rendered all manner of conventional warfare, and even tactical nuclear weapons seemingly obsolete. As a result of this military upheaval, all of the nations of the world have fractured into four coalitions which constantly wage war on each other; the "Legitimacy Kingdom", focused on tradition; the "Capitalist Corporation" (in the anime the "Capitalist Enterprise"), which values profit; the "Information Alliance" (in the anime the "Intelligence Union"), focused on knowledge; and the "Faith Organization", which values religion above everything else. With the perception that Objects can only be destroyed by other Objects, modern-day warfare has been virtually reduced to duels between Objects, resulting in shorter, cleaner, and safer wars. However, two regular soldiers from the Legitimate Kingdom, Qwenthur Barbotage and Havia Winchell, change all of this when, convinced by Qwenthur, they use their smarts and their ingenuity to successfully destroy the "Water Strider" Object of the Faith Organization all by themselves. Having now proven Objects created by man can also be destroyed by man and not just by other Objects, Qwenthur and Havia are thrown into a new world of harrowing adventures and dangerous suicide missions, with Qwenthur also befriending the Legitimate Kingdom's Elite Milinda Brantini, pilot of the Object "Baby Magnum", having saved her during the events of which resulted in the destruction of the Object of the Faith Organization.

== Characters ==
=== Main characters ===
Qwenthur Barbotage (Kuwensā Bābotāju)
Voiced by: Natsuki Hanae (Japanese); Justin Briner (English)
Qwenthur is a young military cadet studying to be a Heavy Object engineer due to his fascination with Objects. His kindness and chivalry is only second to his quick wit. He is Havia's best friend and partner in their missions and usually acts as the brains of the duo. He is also close friends with Milinda after saving her from capture by the Faith Organization.
Havia Winchell (Heivia Wincheru)
Voiced by: Kaito Ishikawa (Japanese); Micah Solusod (English)
Havia is a member of the powerful Winchell family, and joins the military in the hopes of gaining enough fame and renown to earn his inheritance as the head of the Winchell family. He is Qwenthur's best friend and partner in their missions and typically handles all of the fighting. It is later revealed that he wishes to take control of the Winchell family in order to end its feud with the rival Vanderbilt family, so that he can marry his fiance who is part of the Vanderbilts.
Milinda Brantini (Mirinda Burantīni)
Voiced by: Eri Suzuki (Japanese); Alexis Tipton (English)
Milinda, often nicknamed "The Princess", is the pilot of the Legitimate Kingdom's Heavy Object "Baby Magnum", a first generation Object. After being saved by Qwenthur and Havia, Milinda quickly befriends the two soldiers and happily provides whatever support she can to their missions within Baby Magnum. She also develops a crush on Qwenthur following him rescuing her, and often communicates with him via texts. Her jealous outbursts whenever Qwenthur is involved have led most other characters to learn this fact, though Qwenthur himself remains oblivious, believing her to be out of his league as an Elite.
Frolaytia Capistrano (Furōreitia Kapisutorāno)
Voiced by: Shizuka Itō (Japanese); Morgan Garrett (English)
Frolaytia is Qwenthur and Havia's strict and heartless commanding officer. She's often happy to throw the pair into extremely dangerous missions and is quick to punish them for any disobedience. However, she secretly does care for Qwenthur and Havia and does whatever she can to make sure they complete their missions and survive. Her reason for joining the military is because she wants to avoid an arranged marriage with a long list of suitors who want to use her to produce a male heir offspring. Qwenthur's actions help end the pressure of her 3rd suitor, Halreed Copacabana, who had just become 1st on the list.

=== Legitimacy Kingdom ===
Ayami Cherryblossom (Ayami Cherīburossamu)
Voiced by: Mari Yokoo (Japanese); Wendy Powell (English)
The chief mechanic overseeing Milinda and Baby Magnum. Qwenthur was apprenticed under her before his act of heroism, and it is through her that he meets Milinda.
Flide (フライド, Furaido)
Voiced by: Ryusuke Obayashi (Japanese); R. Bruce Elliott (English)
A lead councilman in the Legitimacy Kingdom. He believes that the current state of conflict in the world is the ideal situation for the world, and is willing to sacrifice his own troops to keep it that way.
Seawax (シーワックス, Shīwakkusu)
Voiced by: Rikiya Koyama (Japanese); Ian Sinclair (English)
A journalist who believes that Objects have caused lesser soldiers to become unrecognized. He stages a solo sniping job on the Oceanic Kingdom to turn the tide against them, only to instigate another war between them, causing him to regret his actions.
Vanderbilt (バンダービルト, Bandābiruto)
Voiced by: Maaya Uchida (Japanese); Bryn Apprill (English)
Havia's betrothed who is from a rival family. Although Havia seems to act cold towards her, he truly does care for her as he fears for her life during "The Battle for Supremacy in Antarctica". Also although their families are against their betrothal Havia plans to end the feud once he takes over the Winchell family.
Halreed Copacabana (Harurīdo Kopakabāna)
Voiced by: Ryōta Takeuchi (Japanese); J. Michael Tatum (English)
Halreed is the pilot of the Legitimate Kingdom's Heavy Object "Bright Hopper", a second generation Object. Assigned to defeat the Mass Driver Conglomerate's Heavy Object, Halreed was injured after the Bright Hopper was destroyed by the MDC's railgun. A high ranking noble, Halreed was one of the top suitors to be in an arranged marriage with the Kingdom's commanding officer Frolaytia and produce a male heir offspring out of it. But he canceled those plans after Qwenthur fooled him into thinking that Frolaytia was in an illicit relationship with one of her soldiers.
Bilany Saronno (Bairanī Sarōno)
Voiced by: Minami Takahashi (Japanese); Anastasia Muñoz (English)
Staccato Raylong (Stakkāto Reirongu)
Voiced by: Shinobu Matsumoto (Japanese); Marcus D. Stimac (English)
Staccato is a jet fighter pilot who goes under the codename "Burning Alpha". He assists Qwenthur in freeing the Kingdom's Object Baby Magnum from debris during a mission in the abandoned Amazon City.
Charlotte Zoom (Sharurotto Zūmu)
Voiced by: Saori Ōnishi (Japanese); Felecia Angelle (English)
An oversight officer who is interested in Qwenthur. She joins Qwenthur's team during a mission in Kamchatka that involved infiltrating a radar facility where her and Qwenthur are almost killed.
Myonri (ミョンリ, Myonri)
Voiced by: Kaede Hondo (Japanese); Tia Ballard (English)
Myonri is a soldier assigned to Havia's team during a mission in Kamchatka that involved infiltrating a radar facility. She survives the failed attempt at sabotaging the Faith Organization's Heavy Object "Wing Balancer" and makes it back to base with Havia, Qwethur, and Charlotte.
Westy (ウェスティ Wesuti)
Voiced by: Yuna Yoshino (Japanese); Apphia Yu (English)
Westy is a soldier assigned to Havia's team during a mission in Kamchatka that involved infiltrating a radar facility. She's killed along with Cookman during a failed attempt at sabotaging the Faith Organization's Heavy Object "Wing Balancer".
Charles (チャールズ, Chāruzu)
Voiced by: Daiki Yamashita (Japanese); Clifford Chapin (English)
Charles is the shy and barely speaking military tech expert assigned to Qwenthur's team during a mission in Kamchatka that involved hacking surveillance UAVs belonging to the Faith Organization. He was killed by Nutley who betrayed the group.
Cookman (クックマン, Kukkuman)
Voiced by: Itaru Yamamoto (Japanese); Rick Keeling (English)
Cookman is a soldier assigned to Havia's team during a mission in Kamchatka that involved infiltrating a radar facility. He's killed along with Westy during a failed attempt at sabotaging the Faith Organization's Heavy Object "Wing Balancer".

=== Information Alliance ===
Lendy Farolito (Rendi Farorīto)
Voiced by: Rina Sato (Japanese); Jamie Marchi (English)
Lendy is the Lieutenant Colonel of the Information Alliance. She takes an interest in Qwenthur later on in the series after Qwethur's confrontation with Oh ho ho.
Oh ho ho (おほほ, Ohoho)
Voiced by: Hisako Kanemoto (Japanese); Monica Rial (English)
Oh ho ho is the code name given by the Legitimate Kingdom for the pop idol and pilot of the Information Alliance's Heavy Object "Rush", a second generation Object. Originally assigned to a joint operation in Oceania with the Kingdom's Object Baby Magnum, Oh ho ho prevented Milinda from providing backup to Qwenthur and Havia's mission under the orders of the joint task force commander Councillor Flide. They would cross paths again in Alaska in a battle between Rush and Baby Magnum, where Qwenthur confronts the pilot in her cockpit and finds out her true appearance is child-like due to genetic enhancements. After this confrontation she seems to have developed a crush on Qwethur. She even wanted him as her personal object maintainer.

==== Battlefield Cleanup Service ====
Wydine Uptown (Waidīne Apputaun)
Voiced by: Satomi Arai (Japanese); Carli Mosier (English)
Leader of the team; She will do anything for money. Qwethur convinces her and her team to help them in the Victoria Island battle by paying with the diamonds he found in the mine from his last mission.
Charm (チャーム, Chāmu)
Voiced by: Mari Nakatsu (Japanese); Kristen McGuire (English)
A battle maid serving under Wydine.
Lemish (レミッシュ, Remisshu)
Voiced by: Juri Kimura (Japanese); Natalie Hoover (English)
Another battle maid serving under Wydine.

=== Capitalist Corporations ===
Buffer Planters (Baffa Purantāzu)
Voiced by: Takayuki Sugo (Japanese); Greg Dulcie (English)

=== 24th Mobile Maintenance Battalion ===
Nutley (ナッツレイ, Nattsurei)
Voiced by: Yasuaki Takumi (Japanese); Jessie James Grelle (English)
Prizewell City Slicker (Puraizuweru Shiti Surikkaa)
Voiced by: Katsuyuki Konishi (Japanese); Eric Vale (English)
Prizewell is the pilot of the Legitimate Kingdom's Heavy Object "Indigo Plasma", a second generation Object.

=== Faith Organization ===
Klondike (クロンダイク, Kurondaiku)
Voiced by: Shinpachi Tsuji (Japanese); Mark Stoddard (English)

=== Other characters ===
Monica (モニカ, Monika)
Voiced by: Rumi Okubo (Japanese); Sarah Wiedenheft (English)
Monica is a starlet and battlefield reporter for the CS Military Channel. She is the spoiled daughter of a wealthy noble family, before they lost everything and accepted refuge from Qwenthur's father to hideout in his storehouse. Her position as reporter was set up by Qwenthur himself.
Sladder Honeysuckle (Suraddā Hanīsakkuru)
Voiced by: Yoshimasa Hosoya (Japanese); Ricco Fajardo (English)
The leader of the Mass Driver Foundation, a terrorist group collecting and selling Object weapons in order to use them as an alternative against Objects, inspired by Qwenthur and Havia's actions. He aligns himself with the Intelligence Union, but is captured by Qwenthur and Havia.
Shikibu (シキブ, Shikibu)
Voiced by: Ikumi Hayama (Japanese); Mallorie Rodak (English)
Iekazu (イエカズ, Iekazu)
Voiced by: Junichi Yanagita (Japanese); Anthony Bowling (English)
Orihime (オリヒメ, Orihime)
Voiced by: Inori Minase (Japanese); Alison Viktorin (English)

== Media ==
=== Light novels ===
The series was written by Kazuma Kamachi and illustrated by Nagi. The first light novel volume was published on October 10, 2009, by ASCII Media Works under their Dengeki Bunko imprint. The series ended in its 20th volume, which was released on October 8, 2021.

==== Volume list ====
No.	Title	Japanese release date	Japanese ISBN
1	Heavy Object; Hevī Obujekuto (ヘヴィーオブジェクト)	October 10, 2009	978-4-04-868069-1
2	Heavy Object: Recruitment War; Hevī Obujekuto Saiyō Sensō (ヘヴィーオブジェクト 採用戦争)	June 10, 2010	978-4-04-868594-8
3	Heavy Object: Shadow of the Giants; Hevī Obujekuto Kyōjin-tachi no Kage (ヘヴィーオブジェクト 巨人達の影)	November 10, 2010	978-4-04-870051-1
4	Heavy Object: The Electric Mathematic Treasure; Hevī Obujekuto Denshi Sūgaku no Zaihō (ヘヴィーオブジェクト 電子数学の財宝)	September 10, 2011	978-4-04-870549-3
5	Heavy Object: Festival of Death; Hevī Obujekuto Shi no Saiten (ヘヴィーオブジェクト 死の祭典)	November 10, 2011	978-4-04-870997-2
6	Heavy Object: Path to the Third Generation; Hevī Obujekuto Daisansedai e no Michi (ヘヴィーオブジェクト 第三世代への道)	June 10, 2012	978-4-04-886624-8
7	Heavy Object: Ghost Police; Hevī Obujekuto Bōrei-tachi no Keisatsu (ヘヴィーオブジェクト 亡霊達の警察)	November 9, 2013	978-4-04-866080-8
8	Heavy Object: The 7X% Governor; Hevī Obujekuto Nanamaru Pāsento no Shihaisha (ヘヴィーオブジェクト 七〇%の支配者)	March 8, 2014	978-4-04-866379-3
9	Heavy Object: The Salvation of Negative 195 Degrees; Hevī Obujekuto Hyōtenka Ichikyūgodo no Kyūsai (ヘヴィーオブジェクト 氷点下一九五度の救済)	April 10, 2015	978-4-04-865064-9
10	Heavy Object: The Outer Gods; Hevī Obujekuto Sotonaru Kami (ヘヴィーオブジェクト 外なる神)	October 10, 2015	978-4-04-865452-4
11	Heavy Object: Dance With Noble Sister; Hevī Obujekuto Banira Aji no Kagaku-shiki (ヘヴィーオブジェクト バニラ味の化学式)	February 10, 2016	978-4-04-865764-8
12	Heavy Object: 0.01mm War; Hevī Obujekuto Ichiban Chīsana Sensō (ヘヴィーオブジェクト 一番小さな戦争)	September 10, 2016	978-4-04-892353-8
13	Heavy Object: Northern Empire Cinderella Story ヘヴィーオブジェクト 北欧禁猟区シンデレラストーリー	April 10, 2017	978-4-04-892835-9
14	Heavy Object: Project Whiz Kid ヘヴィーオブジェクト 最も賢明な思考放棄	September 8, 2017	978-4-04-893331-5
15	Heavy Object: Manhattan On Stage ヘヴィーオブジェクト 最も賢明な思考放棄 #予測不能の結末	April 10, 2018	978-4-04-893787-0
16	Heavy Object: Deception Cavalry Quenko-chan へヴィーオブジェクト 欺瞞迷彩クウェン子ちゃん	December 7, 2018	978-4-04-912207-7
17	Heavy Object: Snow White Countdown へヴィーオブジェクト 純白カウントダウン	October 10, 2019	978-4-04-912668-6
18	Heavy Object: The Spear of Desire That Penetrates the Heavens へヴィーオブジェクト 天を貫く欲望の槍	September 10, 2020	978-4-04-913450-6
19	Heavy Object: The Day When People Destroy People (Start) へヴィーオブジェクト 人が人を滅ぼす日（上）	September 10, 2021	978-4-04-913997-6
20	Heavy Object: The Day When People Destroy People (Finish) へヴィーオブジェクト 人が人を滅ぼす日（下）	October 8, 2021	978-4-04-914033-0

=== Manga ===
A manga adaptation with art by Shinsuke Inue was serialized in ASCII Media Works's seinen manga magazines Dengeki Black Maoh and Dengeki Maoh from December 17, 2009, to February 26, 2011. A single tankōbon of the manga was released on May 27, 2011. A second manga adaptation, with art by Sakae Saitō, titled Heavy Object S, was also serialized in Dengeki Maoh from December 27, 2011, to June 27, 2013. Three tankōbon volumes of the manga were released between August 27, 2012, and July 27, 2013. A third manga adaptation, titled Heavy Object A, also by Saitō, was serialized in Dengeki Maoh from February 27, 2015, to October 27, 2016. It also received three tankōbon volumes, released between January 27, 2016, and December 10, 2016.

=== Anime ===
An anime television series adaptation was announced at the Dengeki Bunko Fall Festival event on October 5, 2014. The series was animated by J.C.Staff with 3D computer graphics by Sanzigen. It was directed by Takashi Watanabe, with Hiroyuki Yoshino writing the scripts, Atsuko Watanabe designing the characters, and Maiko Iuchi and Keiji Inai composing the music. The series aired on Tokyo MX, MBS, TV Aichi, BS11, and AT-X from October 2, 2015, to March 25, 2016, and was 24 episodes long. ALL OFF performed the series' first opening theme, titled "One More Chance!!", while Kano performed the series' first ending theme, titled "Dear Brave". ALL OFF also performed the series' second opening theme, titled "Never Gave Up", while Yuka Iguchi performed the series' second ending theme, titled "Strength to Change".

In an episode of Anime News Network's podcast ANNCast, Funimation announced they licensed the series. Anime Limited, in partnership with Funimation, released the series in the United Kingdom. However, in 2019 the series became one of many series to be listed as "sold out" by UK retailers and unavailable from the Anime Limited website. Madman Entertainment licensed the series in Australia and streamed it on their streaming service, AnimeLab. Muse Communication licensed the series in Southeast Asia. They streamed it on their YouTube channel until September 30, 2020.

=== Video games ===
Several characters from the series appeared in the sequel to Dengeki Bunko: Fighting Climax, a fighting game by Sega featuring various characters from works published under the Dengeki Bunko imprint. Specifically, Qwenthur is a playable character, assisted by Milinda and Havia, and Frolaytia is a support character.

== Reception ==
Richard Eisenbeis of Kotaku wrote: "While the characters are static (though enjoyable) and the fanservice heavy, as a thought experiment about the future of war and its impact on our world, Heavy Object certainly excites the imagination." Paul Jensen of Anime News Network reviewed the home video releases in 2017: He felt the first half's delivery of technological information, "fairly underwhelming" drama and "blatant and clumsy" fanservice will put off general audiences, but praised the "buddy cop" banter between Qwenthur and Havia while against some "detailed backgrounds and big explosions" in the battles. While still suffering from heavy "geeky mechanical details" in the dialogue and less than stellar storylines to grab a wider audience, Jensen praised the second half for its inclusion of new supporting characters to help the "overworked main cast" and some "new narrative twists" that breathe new life into the series' formula while being visually consistent in the battlefields.
