= List of A Certain Magical Index light novels =

Cover of the first volume of A Certain Magical Index light novel series released by Dengeki Bunko in Japan on April 10, 2004

A Certain Magical Index is a Japanese light novel series written by Kazuma Kamachi and illustrated by Kiyotaka Haimura. The first volume of the series was published in Japan by ASCII Media Works under their Dengeki Bunko imprint on April 10, 2004, and the twenty-second and final volume was released on October 10, 2010. Two short stories for the series, titled A Certain Magical Index SS, were published in Japan on July 10, 2007, and on November 10, 2008. The series was licensed by Yen Press for English publication in North America on April 19, 2014, with the first volume published on November 18 and the final volume on March 24, 2020.

A sequel to the series, titled A Certain Magical Index: New Testament, published its first volume in Japan on March 10, 2011, and concluded with its twenty-third volume on July 10, 2019. The third sequel, titled A Certain Magical Index: Genesis Testament, published its first volume in Japan on February 7, 2020. As of May 9, 2026, a total of fifteen volumes have been published for Genesis Testament.

== Main series ==
=== A Certain Magical Index (2004–2010) ===
| No. | Original release date | Original ISBN | English release date | English ISBN |
|---|---|---|---|---|
| 01 | April 10, 2004 | 978-4-04-866304-5 | November 18, 2014 | 978-0-316-33912-4 |
Prologue: The Tale of the Illusion Killer Boy – The_Imagine-Breaker. (序章 幻想殺しの少年のお話 The_Imagine-Breaker.); Chapter 1: The Sorcerer Lands in the Town – FAIR,_Occasionally_GIRL. (第一章 魔術師は塔に降り立つ FAIR,_Occasionally_GIRL.); Chapter 2: The Conjurer Bestows Demise – The_7th-Egde. (第二章 奇術師は終焉を与える The_7th-Egde.); Chapter 3: The Grimoire Peacefully Smiles – "Forget_me_not." (第三章 魔道書は静かに微笑む "Forget_me_not."); Chapter 4: The Retiring Sorcerer Chooses the End – (N)Ever_Say_Good_bye. (第四章 退魔師は終わりを選ぶ (N)Ever_Say_Good_bye.); Epilogue: The Conclusion of the Index of Prohibited Books Girl – Index-Librorum-Prohibitorum. (終章 禁書目録の少女の結末 Index-Librorum-Prohibitorum.)
Toma Kamijo, a student of Academy City in Japan with the power of Imagine Breaker in his right hand, finds Index, a young nun from the Anglican Church, hanging on his balcony. Index is being pursued by magicians who seek the Index Librorum Prohibitorum, a collection of 103,000 grimoires within her mind. As he tries to protect her, Kamijo soon learns there is more to Index's pursuers than meets the eye and a secret about her of which he is unaware.
| 02 | June 10, 2004 | 978-4-04-866515-5 | February 24, 2015 | 978-0-316-25942-2 |
Prologue: The Same Usual Every Day – The_Beginning_of_The_End. (序章 相変わらずな日々 The Beginning_of_The_End.); Chapter 1: A Tower of Glass – The_Tower_of_BABEL. (第一章 ガラスの要塞 The_Tower_of_BABEL.); Chapter 2: The Witch-Hunter Moves Along With the Flames – By_The_Holy_Rood... (第二章 魔女狩りは炎と共に By_The_Holy_Rood...); Chapter 3: The Master Has Shut Off the World Like a God – DEUS_EX_MACHINA. (第三章 主は閉じた世界の神のごとく DEUS_EX_MACHINA.); Chapter 4: The Deadly Seven – Deadly_Sins. (第四章 殺しの七並べ Deadly_Sins.); Epilogue: Deep Blood of Corruption – Devil_or_God. (終章 浸食のディープブラッド Devil_or_God.)
Stiyl Magnus asks Kamijo to help him defeat a powerful alchemist named Aureolus Izzard, who kidnaps a miko with the power to kill vampires. Things are not what they appear to be when Kamijo meets the miko herself named Aisa Himegami and learns the alchemist's true goal.
| 03 | September 10, 2004 | 978-4-04-866432-5 | May 19, 2015 | 978-0-316-34054-0 |
Prologue: Radio Noise – Level2 (序章 レディオノイズ Level2); Chapter 1: Imagine Breaker – Level0(and_More) (第一章 イマジンブレイカー Level0(and_More)); Chapter 2: Radio Noise – Level2(Product_Model) (第二章 レディオノイズ Level2(Product_Model)); Chapter 3: Railgun – Level5 (第三章 レールガン Level5); Chapter 4: Accelerator – Level5(Extend) (第四章 アクセラレータ Level5(Extend)); Epilogue: Only One – ID_NoT_Found (終章 オンリーワン ID_NoT_Found)
Kamijo is surprised to discover that Mikoto Misaka has a twin sister, but he learns the latter is actually her clone and there is more of them involved in an experiment involving Accelerator, the most powerful Level 5 esper in Academy City.
| 04 | December 10, 2004 | 978-4-04-866516-2 | August 18, 2015 | 978-0-316-34056-4 |
Prologue: Parallel World in Real World (序章 現実世界のパラレルワールド); Chapter 1: Hex Suspect of the Magician World (第一章 魔術世界のヘクスサスペクト); Chapter 2: The Detectives of This World at War (第二章 戦闘世界のディティクティブ); Chapter 3: The Descent of the Angel That Harms This World (第三章 有害世界のエンゼルフォース); Chapter 4: The Last Sorcerer of This One World (第四章 単一世界のラストウィザード); Epilogue: The Sinners of This Everyday World Who Breached the Trust (終章 日常世界のマイベトレイヤー)
Kamijo goes on vacation to a seaside hotel with Index and his family. Things get weird (except for himself) when everyone in town appears to have switched appearances and nobody notices the change. He joins forces with a Saint named Kaori Kanzaki, his classmate named Motoharu Tsuchimikado, and a Russian magician named Misha Kreutzev, all of whom manage to keep their original appearance, to investigate the cause of this incident and learns somebody is keeping secrets.
| 05 | April 10, 2005 | 978-4-04-866631-2 | November 17, 2015 | 978-0-316-34059-5 |
Prologue: Night of Opening – Good_Bye_Yesterday. (序章 始まりの夜 Good_Bye_Yesterday.); Chapter 1: A Certain Scientific One-Way Road – Last_Order. (第一章 とある科学の一方通行 Last_Order.); Chapter 2: A Certain Ojou's Railgun – Doubt_Lovers. (第二章 とあるお嬢の超電磁砲 Doubt_Lovers.); Chapter 3: A Certain Misaka's Final Signal – Tender_or_Sugary. (第三章 とある御坂の最終信号 Tender_or_Sugary.); Chapter 4: A Certain Freeloading Forbidden Index – Arrow_Made_of_AZUSA. (第四章 とある居候の禁書目録 Arrow_Made_of_AZUSA.); Epilogue: Night of Ending – Welcome_to_Tomorrow. (終章 終わりの夜 Welcome_to_Tomorrow.)
Three stories are set on August 31: Misaka is asked out on a date by the grandson of the principal of her school, Tokiwadai Middle School, but she goes out with Kamijo instead; a suited man armed with a magical crossbow seeks a book from Index's mind; and Accelerator struggles to save the 20,001st Misaka clone named Last Order, who has escaped the laboratory.
| 06 | July 10, 2005 | 978-4-04-866770-8 | February 23, 2016 | 978-0-316-34060-1 |
Prologue: On the Front Side of the Stage (序章 舞台裏の表側); Chapter 1: Opening Ceremony – Baby_Queen. (第一章 始業式 Baby_Queen.); Chapter 2: After School – Break_Time. (第二章 放課後 Break_Time.); Chapter 3: Closure – Battle_Cry. (第三章 閉鎖化 Battle_Cry.); Chapter 4: Stop Sign – Beast_Body,Human_Heart. (第四章 終止符 Beast_Body,Human_Heart.); Epilogue: On the Other Side of the Stage (終章 表舞台の裏側)
On the first day of the new semester, Kamijo meets Hyōka Kazakiri, a strange new transfer student at his school who befriends Index. Meanwhile, a rogue magician from the Anglican Church's Necessarius named Sherry Cromwell infiltrates Academy City to incite a war between magic and science sides.
| 07 | November 10, 2005 | 978-4-04-866517-9 | June 28, 2016 | 978-0-316-27223-0 |
Prologue: Begin Action – The_Page_is_Opened. (序章 行動開始 The_Page_is_Opened.); Chapter 1: Academy City – Science_Worship. (第一章 学園都市 Science_Worship.); Chapter 2: Roman Orthodox Church – The_Roman_Catholic_Church. (第二章 ローマ正教 The_Roman_Catholic_Church.); Chapter 3: British Puritan Church – Anglican_Church. (第三章 イギリス清教 Anglican_Church.); Chapter 4: Amakusa-Style Church of Distinct Doctrines – AMAKUSA_Style_Remix_of_Church. (第四章 天草式十字凄教 AMAKUSA_Style_Remix_of_Church.); Epilogue: End Action – The_Page_is_Shut. (終章 行動終了 The_Page_is_Shut.)
The Roman Catholic Church and the Anglican Church send a joint team to rescue Orsola Aquinas, a Roman Catholic nun who possesses knowledge of decoding a powerful grimoire, from the Amakusa-Style Remix of Church, with Kamijo accidentally getting involved.
| 08 | January 10, 2006 | 978-4-04-866518-6 | August 23, 2016 | 978-0-316-35992-4 |
Prologue: One of Five Fingers – A_TOKIWA-DAI's_World. (序章 五本の指の一本 A_TOKIWA-DAI's_World.); Chapter 1: After School of Girls – After_School_of_Angels. (第一章 彼女達の放課後 After_School_of_Angels.); Chapter 2: Girls Facing Off – Space_and_Point. (第二章 向き合う乙女達 Space_and_Point.); Chapter 3: Hiding Lit Debris – "Remnant" (第三章 残骸が秘める光 "Remnant"); Chapter 4: The Judger – Break_or_Crash? (第四章 決着をつける者 Break_or_Crash?); Epilogue: Every Single Day – One_Place,One_Scene. (終章 それぞれの日々 One_Place,One_Scene.)
Kuroko Shirai, a student of Tokiwadai Middle School and member of Judgment, is in charge of investigating a case of theft, but she soon realizes this is no ordinary theft when Misaka, her beloved onē-sama, and Awaki Musujime, another teleportation esper more powerful than her, get involved.
| 09 | April 10, 2006 | 978-4-04-866632-9 | November 15, 2016 | 978-0-316-35996-2 |
Prologue: Preparations Stage Seen from Third-Person – Parent's_View_Point. (序章 第三者から見た準備期間 Parent's_View_Point.); Chapter 1: Under the Blazing Sun from the Starting Signal – Commence_Hostilities. (第一章 炎天下の中での開始合図 Commence_Hostilities.); Chapter 2: A Stadium of Magicians and Espers – "Stab_Sword." (第二章 魔術師と能力者の競技場 "Stab_Sword."); Chapter 3: Tactics of the Pursuers and Pursued – Worst_Counter. (第三章 追う者と逃げる者の戦略 Worst_Counter.); Chapter 4: Did the Battle End in Victory or Not? – Being_Unsettled. (第四章 戦いの結末は勝利か否か Being_Unsettled.)
The Academy City's sports festival called "Daihaseisai" is officially opened. Kamijo deals with the arrival of his parents and Misaka's mother named Misuzu, while also finding himself in another desperate situation when another magician sneaks into the city.
| 10 | May 10, 2006 | 978-4-04-866519-3 | February 21, 2017 | 978-0-316-35998-6 |
Chapter 5: An Intermission on a Thread of Tension – Resumption_of_Hostilities. (第五章 緊張の糸の上の休息時間 Resumption_of_Hostilities.); Chapter 6: Resumption of Pursuit with an End – Accidental_Firing. (第六章 追撃の再開とその終わり Accidental_Firing.); Chapter 7: The Foe Who Should Be Beaten, the Person Who Should Be Protected – Parabolic_Antenna. (第七章 倒すべき敵、守るべき者 Parabolic_Antenna.); Chapter 8: The Reason for the Clenched Right Fist – Light_of_a_Night_Sky. (第八章 右の拳を握り締める理由 Light_of_a_Night_Sky.); Epilogue: The Awaiting People After the Conclusion – Those_Who_Hold_Out_a_Hand. (終章 終わった後に待つもの達 Those_Who_Hold_Out_a_Hand.)
Kamijo must stop Oriana Thomson and Lidvia Lorenzetti from using the magical artifact Croce di Pietro to take over Academy City and ruin the sports festival while he deals with his parents, Index, his classmates, and Misaka and her mother at the same time.
| 11 | October 10, 2006 | 978-4-04-869395-0 | May 23, 2017 | 978-0-316-36000-5 |
Prologue: The Trip of Northern Italy – Un_Viaggio_in_Italia. (序章 北イタリアの旅行 Un_Viaggio_in_Italia.); Chapter 1: The Streets of Chioggia – Il_Vento_di_Chioggia. (第一章 キオッジオの街並み II_Vento_di_Chioggia.); Chapter 2: The Preparations for Going to London – Un_Frammento_di_un_Piano. (第二章 ロンドンへの準備 Un_Frammento_di_un_Piano.); Chapter 3: Aboard the Capital of Water's Vessel – Il_Mare_e_la_Sconfitta. (第三章 水の都の船の上で II_Mare_e_la_Sconfitta.); Chapter 4: Fireboats and a Battle of Gunfire – Lotte_di_Liberazione. (第四章 火船と砲火の戦い Lotte_di_Liberazione.); Chapter 5: Queen of the Adriatic Sea – La_Regina_del_Mare_Adriático. (第五章 アドリア海の女王 La_Regina_del_Mar_Adriatico.); Epilogue: Return to Academy City – L'inizio_Nuovo••••••. (終章 学園都市への帰還 L'inizio_Nuovo••••••.)
Kamijo wins a trip to the distant island of Chioggia in northern Italy, but he gets caught in the middle of the Adriatic Sea while Roman Catholic Bishop Biagio Busoni's plan to destroy Academy City using the Queen's Fleet flagship The Queen of the Adriatic Sea is underway.
| 12 | January 10, 2007 | 978-4-04-866633-6 | August 22, 2017 | 978-0-316-36002-9 |
Prologue: Shirai Kuroko, Pillow, and Bed – Suffering_of_a_Negligee. (序章 白井黒子と枕とベッド Suffering_of_a_Negligee.); Chapter 1: Sunny Morning Classes – Winter_Clothes. (第一章 午前中授業のひだまり Winter_Clothes.); Chapter 2: What Kind of Penalty Game? – Pair_Contract. (第二章 バツゲームはどんな味？ Pair_Contract.); Chapter 3: Misaka and Misaka's Younger Sister – Sister_and_Sisters. (第三章 ミサカとミサカの妹と Sister_and_Sisters.); Chapter 4: Gently Crossing Pairs – Boy_Meets_Girl(x2). (第四章 緩やかに交差する二組 Boy_Meets_Girl(×2).); Chapter 5: Sunset Unknowingly Passing By – Hard_Way,Hard_Luck. (第五章 曖昧に過ぎていく日没 Hard_Way,Hard_Luck.)
Kamijo and Misaka go on a date as promised in a bet they made during Daihaseisai, but hilarity ensues when Shirai stalks Misaka. Misaka #10032 is tricked by Last Order for her goggles and later takes Kamijo away. Meanwhile, Index meets Accelerator for the first time as they try to find their friends, the nuns at Necessarius try to figure out how to use a new Academy City-made washing machine, and Magnus tries to handle Archbishop of Canterbury Laura Stuart's bathing as her favorite pastime.
| 13 | April 10, 2007 | 978-4-04-866634-3 | November 14, 2017 | 978-0-316-44267-1 |
Chapter 6: Streets Beaten by the Cold Rain – Battle_Preparation. (第六章 冷たい雨に打たれた街 Battle_Preparation.); Chapter 7: Changing Raindrops into the Color of Blood – Revival_of_Destruction. (第七章 雨粒を血の色に変える Revival_of_Destruction.); Chapter 8: Right Seat of Gods and the Imaginary Number School District – Fuse=KAZAKIRI. (第八章 神の右席と虚数学区と Fuse=KAZAKIRI.); Chapter 9: The Differences of Obstacles that Stand in One's Way – Two_Kinds_of_Enemies. (第九章 立ちふさがる障害の違い Two_Kinds_of_Enemies.); Chapter 10: Their Respective Battlefields – The_Way_of_Light_and_Darkness. (第十章 彼らのそれぞれの戦場 The_Way_of_Light_and_Darkness.); Epilogue: The Paths Which the Winners and the Losers Must Go Through – The_Branch_Road. (終章 正と負の進むべき道へ The_Branch_Road.)
A member of God's Right Seat of the Roman Catholic Church named Vento of the Front invades Academy City to kill Kamijo. She defeats the city's security forces with ease and causes havoc, pushing the Board of Directors to release a secret experimental weapon to stop her. Meanwhile, Accelerator faces off against the black ops group called "Hound Dog" led by his former "master" named Amata Kihara.
| 14 | November 10, 2007 | 978-4-04-866433-2 | February 20, 2018 | 978-0-316-44270-1 |
Prologue: An All-Too-Gloomy Church – Bread_and_Wine. (序章 あまりにも暗い聖堂 Bread_and_Wine.); Chapter 1: A Too-Quick Rate of Change – In_a_Long_Distance_Country. (第一章 早すぎる変化の速度 In_a_Long_Distance_Country.); Chapter 2: A Trigger that Becomes a Decisive Blow – Muzzle_of_a_Gun. (第二章 決定打となる引き金 Muzzle_of_a_Gun.); Chapter 3: Something Far Removed from Magicians – Power_Instigation. (第三章 魔術師から遠いもの Power_Instigation.); Chapter 4: A Collection of Steel that Blocks Out the Sky – Cruel_Troopers. (第四章 空を覆う鋼鉄の群れ Cruel_Troopers.); Epilogue: That Answer Leads to the Next Mystery – Question. (終章 その解は次の謎へと Question.)
Kamijo and Tsuchimikado go on a secret mission in Avignon, France to deal with anti-Academy City riots caused by the magical artifact Document of Constantine. Kamijo meets Itsuwa of the Amakusa-Style Remix of Church as she investigates the artifact as well. The trio encounters a member of God's Right Seat named Terra of the Left, who holds the secrets to Kamijo's power. Meanwhile, a special forces group sent by Academy City invades the city.
| 15 | January 10, 2008 | 978-4-04-866434-9 | May 22, 2018 | 978-0-316-44272-5 |
Prologue: The Finest Lead Bullet for You, My Dear – Management. (序章 愛しい貴方へ極上の鉛弾を Management.); Chapter 1: An Unmistakable Gun, Unheard by All – Compass. (第一章 誰にも聞こえぬ確かな号砲 Compass.); Chapter 2: The People Who Have Slowly Begun To Move – Hikoboshi_II. (第二章 ゆっくりと動き出した者達 Hikoboshi_II.); Chapter 3: In the Land of Sealed Powers – Reformatory. (第三章 超能力を封じられた土地で Reformatory.); Chapter 4: The Paper-Thin Difference Between Self-Derision and Pride – Enemy_Level5. (第四章 自嘲と誇りの紙一重の違い Enemy_Level5.); Chapter 5: Defeat the Person with the Strongest Black Wings – Dark_Matter. (第五章 最強の黒い翼に打ち勝つ者 Dark_Matter.); Epilogue: The Victory Prize for Those Who Survived – Nano_Size_Data. (終章 生き残った者が得る戦利品 Nano_Size_Data.)
Chaos breaks out in Academy City when the city's dark side organizations battle each other, with one of them attempting to kill the Board Chairman. But for some, it is the time when old grudges and rivalries will finally come to an end.
| 16 | June 10, 2008 | 978-4-04-867086-9 | August 21, 2018 | 978-0-316-44274-9 |
Prologue: The Standing of a Leader – Stage_in_Roma. (序章 指導者としての立ち位置 Stage_in_Roma.); Chapter 1: From Peace to Ruin on the Proceeding Path – Battle_of_Collapse. (第一章 平穏から破滅へ続く道筋 Battle_of_Collapse.); Chapter 2: The People Who Stood Up from Defeat – Flere210. (第二章 敗北から立ち上がる者達 Flere210.); Chapter 3: The Duel to the Death Between Entirely Different Monsters – Saint_VS_Saint. (第三章 桁の違う怪物同士の死闘 Saint_VS_Saint.); Chapter 4: Who Is Protected by Whom? – Leader_is_All_Members. (第四章 誰が誰を守り守られるか Leader_is_All_Members.); Epilogue: The Guide to Even More Mayhem – True_Target_is•••••• (終章 さらなる騒乱への案内人 True_Target_is••••••)
Itsuwa is tasked to protect Kamijo by becoming his bodyguard and caretaker, resulting in their relationship becoming closer and causing Index to become jealous. Misaka finally realizes her feelings for Kamijo after confronting him about his memory loss. When another member of the God's Right Seat named Acqua of the Back arrives in Academy City to deal with Kamijo's Imagine Breaker, the members of Amakusa-Style Remix of Church, Kanzaki, and Kamijo try to defeat the powerful enemy.
| 17 | March 10, 2009 | 978-4-04-867591-8 | November 13, 2018 | 978-0-316-47454-2 |
Prologue; Chapter 1: The Incongruity of Casual Conversation – Irregular_Spark. (第一章 何気ないやり取りの違和 Irregular_Spark.); Chapter 2: A Steel Battlefield Floating Above the Clouds – Sky_Bus_365. (第二章 雲の上に浮かぶ鋼の戦場 Sky_Bus_365.); Chapter 3: Magic Cabal of the British Labyrinth – N∴L∴ (第三章 イギリス迷路の魔術結社 N∴L∴); Chapter 4: The Sword that Brings War and Disaster – Sword_of_Mercy. (第四章 その剣は戦と災厄を招く Sword_of_Mercy.); Epilogue: Everyone's Expectations and In Their Hearts – War_in_Britain. (終章 それぞれの思惑と胸の内 War_in_Britain.)
Index is summoned by the British royal family to return to the United Kingdom and investigate the mysterious explosion at Eurotunnel. At first, the incident seems to be caused by a group of magicians called "New Light", but Index, Kanzaki, and Itsuwa soon find themselves caught in a power struggle between Necessarius, the royal family, and the Knights of England.
| 18 | July 10, 2009 | 978-4-04-867897-1 | February 19, 2019 | 978-0-316-47456-6 |
Chapter 5: The Mercenary and the Knight's Encounter and Clash – Another_Hero. (第五章 傭兵と騎士の邂逅と激突 Another_Hero.); Chapter 6: Destruction of the Knights' and Princess's Defensive Line – Safety_in_Subway. (第六章 騎士と王女の防衛線破壊 Safety_in_Subway.); Chapter 7: A Wonderful Enemy Who Is Both a Princess and a Queen – Curtana_Original. (第七章 王女と女王の素敵な悪党 Curtana_Original.); Chapter 8: The Queen and the People's General Election – Union_Jack. (第八章 女王と国家の国民総選挙 Union_Jack.); Epilogue: The Nation and a Powerful Enemy Even Further Behind It All – Next_Step. (終章 国家と黒幕の更なる強敵 Next_Step.)
The coup d'état in the United Kingdom known as "British Halloween" continues between the Knights of England under Princess Carissa's leadership and Necessarius with Princess Villian's support. Kamijo goes to face the leaders of the rebels himself, but he gets help from an unexpected ally.
| 19 | November 10, 2009 | 978-4-04-868137-7 | June 18, 2019 | 978-1-9753-5756-6 |
Prologue: The Uninteresting Exchanges Between Evil-doers – Key_Shop. (序章 悪党の退屈なやりとり Key_Shop.); Chapter 1: Goodwill Shall Be Trusted for Now – Dark_Hero. (第一章 善意ぐらい信じている Dark_Hero.); Chapter 2: A Simple Yet Complex Problem – V.S._Calamity. (第二章 単純かつ複雑な問題点 V.S._Calamity.); Chapter 3: Destruction Will Open Up a Wider Path – Battle_to_Die. (第三章 破滅はさらに道を開く Battle_to_Die.); Chapter 4: Two Monsters Inviting You to Hell – Dragon(≠Angel). (第四章 地獄へ誘う二つの怪物 Dragon(≠Angel).); Epilogue: They Will Not Let It End a Tragedy – Brave_in_Hand. (終章 悲劇では終わらせない Brave_in_Hand.)
Academy City's dark side organization GROUP finds themselves caught in a conspiracy involving Board Chairman Aleister Crowley with the mysterious DRAGON. A massive hunt is launched throughout the city to assassinate Shiage Hamazura, who is seen as a threat to Crowley's plans.
| 20 | March 10, 2010 | 978-4-04-868393-7 | October 1, 2019 | 978-1-9753-3124-5 |
Proclamation of War (宣戦布告); Prologue: A Sky that Stinks of Gunpowder – Shooting_Game. (序章 火薬が鼻につく天空 Shooting_Game.); Chapter 1: Good and Evil, They Each Enter the Country – World_War_III. (第一章 善と悪、各々の入国 World_War_III.); Chapter 2: The Beginning of the Invasion and the Counterattack – Angel_Stalker. (第二章 侵攻と逆襲の幕開け Angel_Stalker.); Chapter 3: The Stand-Off Against the Wall of Doubt – Great_Complex. (第三章 疑念の壁と対峙せよ Great_Complex.); Chapter 4: Now Is the Time to Strike Back – Heroes_Congregate. (第四章 ここからが反撃の時 Heroes_Congregate.); War Report (戦況報告)
Russia declares war against Academy City, resulting in the city and its allied nations preparing to invade the country. As the world braces for World War III, Kamijo and Lessar head to Moscow to stop the leader of God's Right Seat named Fiamma of the Right, who has finally gained control of the Index Librorum Prohibitorum and seeks Sasha Kreutzev next as part of his goals. At the same time, Accelerator (with Last Order in tow), Hamazura, and Rikō Takitsubo escape from the forces of Academy City and go to Russia, where Accelerator seeks Index in hopes of obtaining the knowledge to cure Last Order.
| 21 | August 10, 2010 | 978-4-04-868762-1 | December 17, 2019 | 978-1-9753-3126-9 |
War Report (戦況報告); Chapter 5: The Complex Game Board that Is a Battlefield – Enter_Project. (第五章 戦場という複雑な盤 Enter_Project.); Chapter 6: The True Darkness Unfolds – Up_the_Castle. (第六章 展開される本物の闇 Up_the_Castle.); Chapter 7: An Angel Massacring from the Heavens – MISHA_the_Angel_"GABRIEL" (第七章 天空に皆殺しの天使 MISHA_the_Angel_"GABRIEL".); Chapter 8: Their Many-Sided Counterattack – Combination. (第八章 彼らの多角的な反撃 Combination.); War Report (戦況報告)
Fiamma gains Archangel Gabriel's powers and summons the Star of Bethlehem. To prevent Gabriel from destroying Russia, Accelerator, Acqua, and Kazakiri join forces to stop the archangel. Meanwhile, Mikoto, Misaka #10707, and Hamazura try to stop a nuclear attack from Russia.
| 22 | October 10, 2010 | 978-4-04-868972-4 | March 24, 2020 | 978-1-9753-3128-3 |
War Report (戦況報告); Chapter 9: The Time When a Huge Distortion Has Been Corrected – Broken_Right_Hand. (第九章 巨大な歪みを正す時 Broken_Right_Hand.); Chapter 10: Completion of the Final Spell's Preliminary Preparations – Rebirth_the... (第一〇章 最終術式下準備完了 Rebirth_the...); Chapter 11: In the Shining Golden Sky – Star_of_B'stelem. (第一一章 黄金に輝く天空にて Star_of_Bethlehem.); Chapter 12: Final Battle at the Arctic Ocean – Last_Fight. (第一ニ章 北極海の最後の決着 Last_Fight.); Epilogue: Silence and the End of the Boy – Silent_to_Small_Fire. (終章 静寂と少年の終わり Silent_to_Small_Fire.); Proclamation of Armistice (終戦宣言)
With the war coming to a close, Hamazura must now face a vengeful Shizuri Mugino. Accelerator learns how to cure Last Order, which comes with a "price", and Kamijo faces Fiamma on the Star of Bethlehem to free Index from his control and stop his plans of destroying the world.

=== A Certain Magical Index: New Testament (2011–2019) ===
| No. | Original release date | Original ISBN | English release date | English ISBN |
|---|---|---|---|---|
| 01 | March 10, 2011 | 978-4-04-870319-2 | December 12, 2023 | 978-1-9753-8065-6 |
Prologue: The People Who Became the Protagonists By Some Kind of Mistake – War? (序章 何かの手違いで主役になった人達 War?); Chapter 1: A Peaceful Academy City Without "Him" – City. (第一章 "彼"のいない平和的な学園都市 City.); Chapter 2: What Lies Ahead, What Should Be Chosen – Dream. (第二章 これから先の事、選択するべき事 Dream.); Chapter 3: A Slight Margin and an Omen That Connects to the Next – Girl. (第三章 わずかな余白と次へと繋がる予兆 Girl.); Chapter 4: The Right to Become a Good Person and the Right to Reject It – Black. (第四章 善人になる権利と突っぱねる権利 Black.); Chapter 5: Even If He Does Not Become a Hero – Knight(s). (第五章 たとえヒーローにはなれなくても Knight(s).); Epilogue: A Modest Feast and Invited Dark Clouds – Witch. (終章 ささやかなる祝宴と招かれる暗雲 Witch.)
Accelerator and Shiage Hamazura safely return to Academy City and must join forces to rescue the little sister of late Frenda Seivelun named Fremea from the city's new dark side organization called "Freshmen". As they face the Freshmen operative with Bomber Lance ability named Umidori Kuroyoru, Accelerator and Hamazura receive unexpected help from someone thought to be dead after World War III.
| 02 | August 10, 2011 | 978-4-04-870738-1 | May 21, 2024 | 978-1-9753-8835-5 |
Prologue: Unknown Purpose, but Still a Threat — Radiosonde Castle. (序章 使途不明、それでも脅威 Radiosonde Castle.); Chapter 1: A New Territory, Magic Afterwards — Lecture One. (第一章 新たな領域、のちに魔術 Lecture One.); Chapter 2: Unchanging Days, Occasional Differences — Lecture Two. (第二章 変わらぬ日々、時折異質 Lecture Two.); Chapter 3: Accepted One, but There is Unrest — Lecture Three. (第三章 受け入れる者、だが不穏 Lecture Three.); Chapter 4: Invitation, and That Name is... — Lecture Four (and More). (第四章 招待状、そしてその名は Lecture Four (and More).); Epilogue: A Rest, but a Mixture in the Dark Side — Birdway's Speech. (終章 休息、しかし暗部で交錯 Birdway's Speech.)
After the rescue of Fremea from Freshmen, Toma Kamijo invites Accelerator and Hamazura to his dormitory, where the two are introduced to magic by the leader of the Dawn-colored Sunlight magic cabal named Leivinia Birdway, who saved Kamijo at the end of World War III. Elsewhere, Kaori Kanzaki and Necessarius investigate the appearance of a giant floating fortress known as Radiosonde Castle.
| 03 | December 10, 2011 | 978-4-04-886240-0 | September 17, 2024 | 978-1-9753-8837-9 |
Prologue: In the Fiftieth State — Crisis of Blue Ocean. (序章 五〇番目の州で Crisis_of_Blue_Ocean.); Chapter 1: Which Side Will Deliver a Preemptive Strike? — First Contact. (第一章 先制攻撃はどっちがやる First_Contact.); Chapter 2: The Trigger — Natural Bomb. (第二章 起爆剤 Natural_Bomb.); Chapter 3: The Target of the Scorching Lava — Case to War. (第三章 灼熱の溶岩の狙い Case_to_War.); Chapter 4: Isolation and the Collapse of the Rules — Trident. (第四章 孤立とルールの崩壊 Trident.); Chapter 5: For What Purpose Should That Strength Be Used? — The Old Glory. (第五章 その強さは何のためにあるべきか The_Old_Glory.); Epilogue: Reliable Birdway — Queen Period. (終章 頼りになるバードウェイ Queen_Period.)
Birdway leads a group composed of Kamijo, Mikoto Misaka, Accelerator, Hamazura, Misaka Worst, and Kuroyoru to Hawaii to investigate GREMLIN, an organization that aims for the destruction of Academy City and its espers. Upon their arrival at New Honolulu International Airport, the group is attacked by GREMLIN members, but they receive unexpected help from the president of the United States Roberto Katze.
| 04 | March 10, 2012 | 978-4-04-886373-5 | March 18, 2025 | 978-1-9753-8839-3 |
Chapter 01: Main.01; Chapter 02: Sub.02; Chapter 03: Sub.03; Chapter 04: Sub.04; Chapter 05: Sub.05; Chapter 06: Sub.06; Chapter 07: Period.07; Chapter 08: Sub.08; Chapter 09: Sub.09; Chapter 10: Sub.10; Chapter 11: Main.11; Chapter 12: Main.12; Chapter 13: Sub.13; Chapter 14: Sub.14; Chapter 15: Sub.15; Chapter 16: Sub.16; Chapter 17: Sub.17; Chapter 18: Sub.18; Chapter 19: Sub.19; Chapter 20: Main.20; Chapter 21: Period.21; Chapter 22: Sub.22; Chapter 23: Sub.23; Chapter 24: Sub.24; Chapter 25: Sub.25; Chapter 26: Sub.26; Chapter 27: Sub.27; Chapter 28: Sub.28; Chapter 29: Sub.29; Chapter 30: Main.30; Chapter 31: Main.31; Chapter 32: Period.32; Chapter 33: Sub.33; Chapter 34: A_Cardinal_Error.34; Chapter 35: Connection Process (接続過程); Chapter n: Even Though There Was Death — Dead_to... (第n章 たとえ死があったとしても Dead_to...); Chapter 37: Profound Destruction. ﾙ9ﾆ1bｶｹrｻ991ﾏ (深刻な破損 ﾙ9ﾆ1bｶｹrｻ991ﾏ)
Anti-Academy City forces hold a tournament called "Natural Selector" at Baggage City located in Eastern Europe with the purpose of finding a magic power more superior than esper powers. Aided by GREMLIN, they hope to use that power to destroy Academy City. In response, Academy City sends three members of the Kihara family to stop them. Meanwhile, the little sister of Seria Kumokawa named Maria arrives in Baggage City to look for her missing beloved teacher.
| 05 | October 10, 2012 | 978-4-04-886978-2 | December 30, 2025 | 978-1-9753-8841-6 |
Prologue: The Greatest Proposition — Question_01. (序章 最大の命題 Question_01.); Chapter 1: All of a Sudden, It Begins — Open_the_Festival. (第一章 気がつけば開幕 Open_the_Festival.); Chapter 2: Who is the Real Enemy? — Secret_Promise. (第二章 本当の敵は誰なのか Secret_Promise.); Chapter 3: The Gate Opens — Impregnable. (第三章 開門 Impregnable.); Chapter 4: Peace Seen From a Strange Form — Release_Monster. (第四章 異形から見た平穏 Release_Monster.); Epilogue: Remove the Restraints — Install......Completion (終章 箍を外す Install......Completion.)
Ollerus and Fiamma of the Right return Kamijo to Academy City after his brutal defeat at the hands of Othinus. Every school in the city is preparing for a big cultural festival known as Ichihanaransai. A member of GREMLIN named Thor infiltrates the city and asks for Kamijo's help to rescue Fräulein Kreutune from the mysterious Windowless Building.
| 06 | January 10, 2013 | 978-4-04-891253-2 | July 14, 2026 | 978-1-9753-8843-0 |
Chapter 5: Surely Justice Can be Found Anywhere — Black_to_Light. (第五章 きっと正義はどこにでも Black_to_Light.); Chapter 6: Monster, Monster, Monster, Monster — All_Bad_Stars. (第六章 怪物、怪物、怪物、怪物 All_Bad_Stars.); Chapter 7: One Need Not be a Protagonist — Girls_Battle_Talk. (第七章 主人公である必要はなに Girls_Battle_Talk.); Chapter 8: The Simplest Structure in the World — One_on_One. (第八章 この世で最も単純な構図 One_on_One.); Epilogue: Let the Next Fight Begin — Next_Batter_Circle. (終章 次の喧嘩を始めましょう Next_Batter_Circle.)
On the day of Ichihanaransai, Ollerus' forces and GREMLIN are on the verge of a clash in Academy City over Kreutune, causing a great amount of chaos. Kamijo and Thor attempt to find ways to stop the conflict. Adding to the chaos is the return of the once dead second-most powerful Level 5 esper Teitoku Kakine, who is rampaging throughout the city to seek vengeance on Accelerator.
| 07 | May 10, 2013 | 978-4-04-891604-2 | April 13, 2027 | 979-8-8554-4458-2 |
Prologue: A Sweet Smelling Inviolable Territory — Girls'_School. (序章 甘い匂いの不可侵領域 Girls'_School.); Chapter 1: Altar of the Wisdom King — Foreign_matter. (第一章 明王の壇 Foreign_matter.); Chapter 2: The Wandering Beast and Outside the Cage — Dead_Girl. (第二章 彷徨う獣と檻の外 Dead_Girl.); Chapter 3: ??? — Agitate_Halation. (第三章 ??? Agitate_Halation.); Chapter 4: Destruction of the Pre-Established Harmony — Total_Hero. (第四章 予定調和の破壊 Total_Hero.); Epilogue: Once It's Over — To_the_Main_Line. (終章 終わってみれば To_the_Main_Line.)
Kamijo wakes up in a mysterious small black space, which turns out to be a box, and finds himself in the School Garden located in Tokiwadai Middle School after Motoharu Tsuchimikado sent him to stop a magician named Yūga Umezaki from using the highly destructive homa altar known as the Altar of the Wisdom King inside the area. Meanwhile, Tsuchimikado is going on a rampage after the supposed death of his stepsister Maika while also investigating the mysterious Agitate Halation Project. The project involves Fremea and can supposedly create a world without heroes.
| 08 | September 10, 2013 | 978-4-04-891904-3 | — | — |
Prologue: Return of the God of Magic — None_Signal_Island. (序章 魔術の神の帰還 None_Signal_Island.); Chapter 1: Preparations in the Background of Peace — A_Terrestrial_Globe. (第一章 平穏の裏の準備 A_Terrestrial_Globe.); Chapter 2: Miniature Garden Within the Investigation — Area_No.23. (第二章 探査の内の箱庭 Area_No.23.); Chapter 3: Doubt at the Edge of Decision — Turning_Point. (第三章 確定の隅の疑念 Turning_Point.); Chapter 4: Disaster in the Depths of Fertility — Goddess_of_Fertility. (第四章 豊穣の奥の災厄 Goddess_of_Fertility.); Epilogue: Lance — Lance_of_"Gungnir". (終章 槍 Lance_of_"Gungnir".)
Ollerus disguises as Thor and infiltrates GREMLIN to stop Othinus from becoming a complete Magic God. Kamijo, Index, Misaka, Birdway, Lessar, and Maria travel to Tokyo to find the GREMLIN base known as Sargasso. The group is separated after their plane got destroyed. GREMLIN ends up attacking Tokyo, creating chaos throughout the city. During this chaos, the Norse fertility goddess named Freyja attacks Kamijo, who is trying to locate his friends and reach Tokyo Bay.
| 09 | January 10, 2014 | 978-4-04-866222-2 | — | — |
Prologue: The End of a Certain World - Game_Over. (序章 ある世界の終わり Game_Over.); Chapter 5: Further than the Farthest Reaches - Point_Unknown. (第五章 最果てよりも遠く Point_Unknown.); Chapter 6: Shifting and Fluctuating World - Version_Alpha. (第六章 移ろい揺らぐ世界 Version_Alpha.); Chapter 6: Shifting and Fluctuating World - Version_Beta. (第六章 移ろい揺らぐ世界 Version_Beta.); Chapter 6: Shifting and Fluctuating World - Version_Omega. (第六章 移ろい揺らぐ世界 Version_Omega.); Chapter 7: "A Normal High School Boy" - Black_or_White. (第七章「平凡な高校生」Black_or_White.); Chapter 8: Girl Phase, Hundreds of Billions - Create_V.S._Break. (第八章 少女位相、幾千億 Create_V.S._Break.); Epilogue: Will You Accept It, or Not? - Continue. (終章 認めるのか、否か Continue.)
Othinus becomes a complete Magic God and destroys the world, leaving only herself and Kamijo. She desires to isolate the power of his Imagine Breaker by breaking his spirit. Kamijo must now survive an infinite number of worlds she created specifically to break him.
| 10 | May 10, 2014 | 978-4-04-866532-2 | — | — |
Prologue: A Certain Boy Becomes Humanity's Enemy - Introduction_00. (序章 とある少年は人類の敵となりて Introduction_00.); Chapter 9: V.S. "The One who Bears White and Black Wings and Opposes the World" - Round_01. (第〇九章 V.S.『白と黒の翼携え世に抗う者』 Round_01.); Chapter 10: V.S. "The Fury of Two Billion" - Round_02. (第一〇章 V.S.『二〇億の猛威』Round_02.); Chapter 11: V.S. "The Nuns Wavering in God's Majesty" - Round_03. (第一一章 V.S.『神威にたゆたう修道女達』Round_03.); Chapter 12: V.S. "The Four Demon-Slaying Swords" - Round_04. (第一二章 V.S.『魔を屠る四つの刃』Round_04.); Chapter 13: V.S. "The Blacksmith who Releases the Magic Sword" - Round_05. (第一三章 V.S.『魔剣を解放せし鍛冶師』Round_05.); Chapter 14: V.S. "The Police of the Front Stage" - Round_06. (第一四章 V.S.『表舞台の警察』Round_06.); Chapter 15: V.S. "The Merciless Scientific Vanguard" - Round_07. (第一五章 V.S.『無慈悲なる科学の尖兵』Round_07.); Chapter 16: V.S. "The Heaven-Sent Child Loved by Electrons" - Round_08. (第一六章 V.S.『電子に愛されし申し子』Round_08.); Chapter 17: V.S. "The Master of the Library and the Magic Queen" - Round_09. (第一七章 V.S.『図書館の主と魔術の女王』Round_09.); Chapter 18: V.S. "The One who Opposes the Magic God" - Round_10. (第一八章 V.S.『魔神に対する者』Round_10.); Chapter 19: V.S. "The Hammer-Wielding Almighty God" - Round_11. (第一九章 V.S.『槌振るいし全能神』Round_11.); Chapter 20: V.S. "???" - Round_12(Secret). (第二〇章 V.S.『？？？』Round_12(Secret).); Epilogue: What does the Right Hand Grasp After the Fighting? — Finale_∞ (終章 争いの果てに、右手が掴むものは Finale_∞.)
Othinus decides to return Kamijo to his original world. Due to her actions, the whole world wants Othinus dead and is hunting her down. To make the situation worse, Ollerus' fairy spell is slowly killing her from the inside. Despite everything the Magic God has done, Kamijo decides to become the enemy of the entire world and helps her to retrieve her right eye from the spring of Mímir in Denmark. If the eye is reattached to Othinus then she will return to being a human, which is the only solution to both of their problems. Unfortunately, Kamijo is pitied by many of his friends and former enemies.
| 11 | October 10, 2014 | 978-4-04-866938-2 | — | — |
Prologue: A Certain Entrance — No.05_Open (序章 ある入口 No.05_Open); Chapter 1: Reminiscence >> Front Hall — Episode_"the_Girl". (第一章 追憶＞＞正面ホール Episode_"the_Girl".); Chapter 2: Blank Paper >> Labyrinth — Broken_road. (第二章 白紙＞＞迷宮 Broken_road.); Chapter 3: True Motive >> Gallery — Another_Answer. (第三章 真意＞＞ギャラリー Another_Answer.); Chapter 4: Chance Meeting >> Audience Chamber — Duel_in_the_Mind. (第四章 邂逅＞＞謁見の間 Duel_in_the_Mind.); Epilogue: A Certain Exit — No.05_Closed(and_Next_Door). (終章 ある出口 No.05_Closed(and_Next_Door).)
Misaki Shokuhou's past with Kamijo comes into question when she notices major changes in the landmark they spent time together. She decides to investigate and seek help from Seria. Shokuhou eventually runs into someone thought to be dead who wants revenge on her for more than one reason.
| 12 | March 10, 2015 | 978-4-04-869333-2 | — | — |
Prologue: Limit of the World's Allowance — Foreign_GODs,or_Evil_KINGs. (序章 世界の許容その限界 Foreign_GODs,or_Evil_KINGs.); Chapter 1: Steamed Buns and Diamonds — to_the_DIANOID. (第一章 饅頭とダイヤモンド to_the_DIANOID.); Chapter 2: Chance Meeting between a Magic God and a Liar — St.Germain,and_LIAR. (第二章 魔神と嘘つきの邂逅 St.Germain,and_LIAR.); Chapter 3: The Vanishing Girl's Legacy — Hard_MEMORY. (第三章 消え入る少女の遺産 Hard_MEMORY.); Chapter 4: A Single Breakthrough — Hand_Made_ROUTE. (第四章 ただ一つ突き抜ける Hand_Made_ROUTE.); Epilogue: End of the Extremely Passionate Quickening — CRAZY_1st_cry. (終章 狂熱の胎動の終わり CRAZY_1st_cry.)
Kamijo, Index, and Othinus (now stands at 15 centimeters) arrive in the commercial building complex known as Dianoid at Academy City's District 15 to buy the latter a dollhouse where she can hide from Sphynx. Afterward, all of the doors in Dianoid lock and trap them inside, along with ITEM members and other visitors. Even worse, a magician named St. Germain, who claims to be a Magic God, is inside the building and has a strange interest in a boy pretending to be the sixth-most powerful Level 5 esper Etsu Aihana.
| 13 | July 10, 2015 | 978-4-04-865244-5 | — | — |
Prologue: Another Possible Demise — Before_the_End. (序章 あるいはこんな終焉も Before_the_End.); Chapter 1: The Magic God is Always There — Sword_and_Sheath. (第一章 魔神はいつでもそこに Sword_and_Sheath.); Chapter 2: Run, or Die — Chase_With_the_Girl. (第二章 走れ、さもなくば死ね Chase_With_the_Girl.); Chapter 3: Beyond the Broken Spider Web — Nightmare_to_Ray_of_Hope. (第三章 千切れた蜘蛛の糸の先 Nightmare_to_Ray_of_Hope.); Chapter 4: End of an Unwinnable Battle — A.A.A. (第四章 勝利なき戦いの終わり A.A.A.); Epilogue: Another Possible Beginning — The_End_is_Named... (終章 あるいはこんな開幕も The_End_is_Named...)
Kamijo refuses High Priest's offer to become a scorer, causing the Magic God to go on a rampage throughout Academy City. He must escape while riding one of the new hi-tech Acrobikes with an uninformed Misaka by his side.
| 14 | November 10, 2015 | 978-4-04-865507-1 | — | — |
Prologue: The Magic God is Now Nearby — Home_Party? (序章 魔神が身近になりました Home_Party?); Chapter 1: Imagine Breaker and World Rejecter — One_Night_Encount. (第一章 幻想殺しと理想送り One_Night_Encount.); Chapter 2: Freeloaders Tend to Grow in Number — Cannibalization. (第二章 居候とは増えるもの Cannibalization.); Chapter 3: The Girls' Desires and Their Intersection — Winner's_"APPLE". (第三章 少女願望、その交差 Winner's_"APPLE".); Chapter 4: Tōma Kamijō and Kakeru Kamisato — Attack_the_Fist. (第四章 上条当麻と上里駆流 Attack_the_Fist.); Epilogue: The Time for the Cradle Comes to an End — More_Purely,More_Bloody. (終章 揺りかごの時間の終わり More_Purely,More_Bloody.)
Kakeru Kamisato wields a power opposite to Imagine Breaker called "World Rejecter" in his right hand, which can banish anyone with conflicting desires (or anything created by someone with conflicting desires) to a "new world". With this power, he has banished every Magic God in existence except for Othinus. Kamisato confronts Kamijo, but they soon get involved in an even bigger conflict between the Birdway sisters about the virus known as Sample Shoggoth.
| 15 | April 9, 2016 | 978-4-04-865884-3 | — | — |
Prologue: The Reverse Reverse Side of the Coin — Rock_on_Right_Arm. (序章 コインの裏の裏 Rock_on_Right_Arm.); Chapter 1: Confrontation, or New Days — Turn_a_New-Leaf. (第一章 対峙、あるいは新たな日々 Turn_a_New-Leaf.); Chapter 2: Peace, or a Trap Laid — Board_Game. (第二章 平穏、あるいは巣を張る罠 Board_Game.); Chapter 3: Conversion, or a Change of Viewpoint — Not_Fiend, Not_Enemy. (第三章 転換、あるいは視点の変更 Not_Fiend, Not_Enemy.); Chapter 4: Despair, or an Objective Revealed — Artificial_Disaster. (第四章 絶望、あるいは目的の明示 Artificial_Disaster.); Chapter 5: Hope, or Depthless Darkness — To_the_Magic. (第五章 光明、あるいは底なしの闇 To_the_Magic.); Epilogue: The Front Front Side of the Coin — Lock_on_Light_Girl. (終章 コインの表の表 Lock_on_Light_Girl.)
Kamijo and his classmates temporarily attend a different high school after their facility got destroyed by the High Priest's rampage. He finds Kamisato transferring to this new school. To make matters worse, Kamisato's non-biological sister named Salome infiltrates Academy City to kill members of the Kamijo Faction. Meanwhile, Yuītsu Kihara plots her revenge against Kamisato for killing her sensei.
| 16 | August 10, 2016 | 978-4-04-892251-7 | — | — |
Prologue: Holing Up at School, Starting with Swimsuits – Melt_the_Asphalt. (序章 水着で始める学校籠城 Melt_the_Asphalt.); Chapter 1: Securing Safety in the Scorching Heat – Water_Hunt. (第一章 灼熱で続ける安全確保 Water_Hunt.); Chapter 2: Attacking a Base with a High-Class Girl – Tower_of_the_Crystal. (第二章 お嬢と進める拠点攻略 Tower_of_the_Crystal.); Chapter 3: Mutual Request for Assistance Between Enemies – Double_Enemy. (第三章 宿敵と交わす協力要請 Double_Enemy.); Chapter 4: A Sudden Change That Tells of Ruin – Operation_Right_Hand. (第四章 破滅を伝える急転直下 Operation_Right_Hand.); Epilogue: A Model Answer That Exceeds Disaster – Nightmare_by_Lost_Boy. (終章 災厄を超える模範解答 Nightmare_by_Lost_Boy.)
A mysterious 55 °C (131 °F) heat wave has overtaken Academy City during the December chill. Everyone is forced to stay in shelters and find ways to get water. Making the situation way worse is the appearance of the Elements, large creatures that resemble either plants or animals and have elemental powers controlled by their cores. Kamijo and his classmates venture outside to hunt for water. He gets separated from the group after the Elements attacked them, but he is saved by Misaka and is brought to Tokiwadai Middle School's School Garden to plot their counterattack.
| 17 | November 10, 2016 | 978-4-04-892486-3 | — | — |
Prologue: Or the Assumptions Include the Conclusion – to_the_Girl's_ABYSS. (序章 あるいは前提こそ結論を含む to_the_Girl's_ABYSS.); Chapter 1: Or Cutting Off Leads to Diffusion – Gray_City. (第一章 あるいは遮断こそ拡散へ至る Gray_City.); Chapter 2: Or Escape Provides a Counterattack – Social_Network_Slayer. (第二章 あるいは逃走こそ逆襲を得る Social_Network_Slayer.); Chapter 3: Or Isolation Surpasses a Group – Engage_U.F.O. (第三章 あるいは孤独こそ集団に勝る Engage_U.F.O.); Chapter 4: Or a Taboo Brings Peace – Salvage_XXX. (第四章 あるいは禁忌こそ安寧を掴む Salvage_XXX.); Epilogue: Or Doubt Contains the Truth – Bet_Time,Red_or_Black. (終章 あるいは疑念こそ真理は宿る Bet_Time,Red_or_Black.)
Yuītsu manages to wield World Rejecter via Kamisato's severed right hand and banishes him to the "new world". The Kamisato Faction is forcibly placed under her control, except for the UFO girl named Fran Karasuma who sides with Kamijo as they search for a way to rescue Kamisato to free the Kamisato Faction from Yuītsu. The problem is aside from being chased by 100 girls of the faction, a unit that will restore Academy City called "Useful Spider" brands them as criminals. "Using Final Bosses to Determine a Sociological Threat": Kuroko Shirai and Kazari Uiharu visit the Board of Directors Library to learn how final bosses of video games predict real-life scenarios.
| 18 | May 10, 2017 | 978-4-04-892893-9 | — | — |
Prologue: Connection Point – Destiny_Joint. (序章 連結点 Destiny_Joint.); Chapter 1: That Which Is Necessary to Survive – X. (第一章 生き残るために必要な事 X.); Chapter 2: To Where Should You Flee? – Escape_to_Central. (第二章 逃げ込むべき先は Escape_to_Central.); Chapter 3: Golden – A.D.1900_Invisible_War. (第三章『黄金』A.D.1900_Invisible_War.); Chapter 4: A Worthwhile Battle at Heaven's Peak – "Light". (第四章 天の項にて価値ある一戦を "Light".); Epilogue: Bursting Malice – Devil_in_Evil. (終章 破裂する悪意 Devil_in_Evil.)
Karasuma and Motoharu are being hunted down by Academy City's Board Chairman Aleister Crowley. The two decide to flee the city, but a curse is placed on Maika. Kamijo, Index, Othinus, the Tsuchimikado siblings, and Karasuma raid the Windowless Building to find a way to remove the curse. As they ascend the building, Kamijo is forced to hallucinate flashbacks at the leisure of a black cat witch named Mina Mathers and Crowley himself, whose plan is on the verge of completion due to Kamijo's presence. Bonus short story: Kamijo and Index play a game called "1st Never-Leaving-the-Kotatsu Championship", during which they find clever ways to make the other leave the kotatsu.
| 19 | October 7, 2017 | 978-4-04-893405-3 | — | — |
Prologue: An Oracle from a Holy Guardian Angel – the_Angel "A". (序章 聖守護天使より神託を込めて the_Angel "A".); Chapter 1: A Small Light Beginning with an L – Lost_Princess. (第一章 Lの冠を頭に戴く小さな輝き Lost_Princess.); Chapter 2: An Awakening Beast Visits a City of Steel – X = Scarlet. (第二章 目を覚ます獣、鋼の街を行く X = Scarlet.); Chapter 3: That Person Cannot Forget the Kindness of Man – Gift_of_the_Hope. (第三章 かの者は人の優しさを忘れず Gift_of_the_Hope.); Chapter 4: Are you Prepared to Distort the Laws of the World? – Human. (第四章 理をねじ曲げる覚悟はあるか Human.); Epilogue: A Throneless Demon Roars in Hell – the_Devil "C". (終章 王座なき悪魔は地獄で吼える the_Devil "C".)
Crowley's plan, the very purpose behind Academy City's creation and his sole goal for centuries, has failed by the efforts of Kamijo and his friends. Archbishop of Canterbury Laura Stuart makes her move and kills Crowley with the Sword of Damocles, revealing herself to be the Great Demon Coronzon. Crowley diffuses the many alternate possibilities of himself to survive and takes a young female possibility named Aleis-tan. She allies with Kamijo and launches the Windowless Building with Coronzon inside into space to buy some time. The two must reunite with Kamijo's friends and find a way to stop Coronzon. Meanwhile, Hamazura finds himself wearing the powerful Processor Suit and learns he is being framed for a crime he didn't commit. He later finds an abandoned baby named Lilith while on the run from the true criminal and Accelerator and decides to take her with him to protect her. "Thus Spoke the Kumokawa Sisters": Maria visits Seria as she saddens about Maika leaving their school.
| 20 | June 9, 2018 | 978-4-04-893871-6 | — | — |
Prologue: Science and Magic are Reversed — Become_to_War. (序章 科学と魔術はひっくり返る Become_to_War.); Chapter 1: The Unwavering Magical Kingdom and the Pervert — Welcome_Home, A.C!! (第一章 揺るぎなき魔術大国と変態 Welcome_Home, A.C!!); Chapter 2: The Execution Tower Opens Its Large Maw and Waits — the_Abyss_of_London. (第二章 処刑塔は大顎を開いて待つ the_Abyss_of_London.); Chapter 3: Blood Selection, a Devout Weapon — SISTER(xN.A._Weapon). (第三章 血の選択、ある敬虔な兵器 SISTER(xN.A._Weapon).); Chapter 4: Crowley's Most Hated Thing — Justice. (第四章 クロウリーが一番嫌いな物 Justice.); Epilogue: The Golden Approaches from the Distant Horizon — Dawn_to_the_... (終章 地平の彼方より黄金は迫る Dawn_to_the_...)
Aleis-tan sends her unique possibilities dubbed as "Crowley's Hazards" to attack all traces of Coronzon throughout the Commonwealth of Nations to ease her defeat. She leads a group consisting of Kamijo, Index, Othinus, Accelerator, Hamazura, Rikō Takitsubo, and Karasuma to attack London, where Crowley's former home and Coronzon's base are located. They find themselves facing the Anglican Church and the Knights of England, both being possessed by the Madness of War. As she stages their attack, Aleis-tan infects Academy City with a virus to protect its cutting-edge technology from Coronzon, forcing an evacuation of its students to various places around the world. Bonus short story: Misaka and Shokuhou discuss what country their class can visit to relax while Academy City ceases to function.
| 21 | October 10, 2018 | 978-4-04-912025-7 | — | — |
Prologue: The Golden and Its Past – True_Wizards. (序章 黄金、その遍歴 True_Wizards.); Chapter 1: Frenzy – Welcome_to_GD_Paradise!! (第一章 狂乱 Welcome_to_GD_Paradise!!); Chapter 2: That Which Human Wisdom Compiled – Grimoire_Nova. (第二章 ヒトの叡智が編み上げたモノ Grimoire_Nova.); Chapter 3: Highway Lock On – Speed_Freaks. (第三章 ハイウェイ・ロックオン Speed_Freaks.); Chapter 4: I'm No Messiah – Battle_of_Scotland. (第四章 メサイアにはなれない Battle_of_Scotland.); Epilogue: I Can't Let It End Like This – Go_for_Broke!! (終章 こんな結末許せるか Go_for_Broke!!)
Aleis-tan, Kamijo, and Accelerator search for the remains of Samuel Liddell MacGregor Mathers in the graveyard of Westminster Abbey for them to control Coronzon due to her past contract with him. They find the body fake and somehow, the supposed-to-be-dead members of Golden Dawn appear to hunt them down. The trio takes a detour in their plans against Coronzon to ward off the powerful magic cabal and defend the British royal family against them. Meanwhile, Heaven Canceller arrives in Egypt along with Nōkan Kihara to help Mina prepare a body for Lilith, who turns out to be Crowley's daughter. Hamazura, Takitsubo, and the Magic Gods Nephthys and Niang-Niang encounter a Golden Dawn magician named Dion Fortune. Misaka and Shokuhou travel to the United Kingdom after learning from the former's father of Kamijo's presence in the country. Orsola Aquinas and Kanzaki aid Index and Karasuma to make up their actions when they were previously possessed by the Divine Mixture Isis-Demeter and the Madness of War.
| 22 | March 9, 2019 | 978-4-04-912385-2 | — | — |
Prologue: (Untitled) – ARCHENEMY_with_the_ABYSS. (序章（無題）ARCHENEMY_with_the_ABYSS.); Chapter 1: (Untitled) – Break_a_Right_and_Hope. (第一章（無題）Break_a_Right_and_Hope.); Chapter 2: (Untitled) – Over_the_Checkmate. (第二章（無題）Over_the_Checkmate.); Chapter 3: (Untitled) – World_Decomposer. (第三章（無題）World_Decomposer.); Chapter 4: (Untitled) – MAGICK_Warfare. (第四章（無題）MAGICK_Warfare.); Epilogue: A Man's Life Comes to an End After Receiving Countless Wounds Over the Course of a Long Journey – (Untitled) (終章 あるいは多くの傷を負いながら永き道のりを歩き通した末一人の男の人生に終止符が打たれるまでの物語 (Untitled))
Coronzon is finally free of the contract and begins her plan to hijack the United Kingdom using the Honors of Scotland. While a fatally-wounded Aleis-tan and right-hand-less Kamijo recover in Edinburgh Castle, Accelerator makes full use of his contract with an artificial demon named Qliphah Puzzle 545 to fight Coronzon separate from the British forces. However, things get complicated even further when Hamazura sides with Coronzon to seek her help in returning Fortune to life, leading him to uncover her true nature and deadly scheme. The current chaos attracts the attention of Anna Sprengel, a fabled woman supposedly responsible for the creation of the Golden Dawn, and draws all involved towards a final battle onboard the weaponized ship known as Queen Britannia.
| 22R | July 10, 2019 | 978-4-04-912667-9 | — | — |
Prologue: The Path to Battle's End – Road_to_the_Peace. (序章 終戦までの流れ Road_to_the_Peace.); Chapter 1: Smile – After_Battle. (第一章 笑顔 After_Battle.); Chapter 2: Small Glory – Party_for_Winners. (第二章 ささやかな栄冠 Party_for_Winners.); Chapter 3: Reverse Position – Winged_Lizard. (第三章 リバースポジション Winged_Lizard.); Chapter 4: Surmount the Difficulty Called Himself – Break_the_Wall. (第四章 自己という関門を超える Break_the_Wall.); Epilogue: Gold and Rose – Change_the_Rail. (終章 黄金と薔薇 Change_the_Rail.)
After the defeat of Coronzon, Kamijo, Index, Misaka, and Shokuhou attend a party at Windsor Castle to celebrate the victory when a massive dragon appears. The dragon transforms itself into the real Kamijo, revealing the other one to be the doppelgänger that got separated from him at the end of the battle with Coronzon. Kamijo must face his other self and save the worlds of magic and science from the conflict.

=== A Certain Magical Index: Genesis Testament (2020–present) ===
| No. | Release date | ISBN |
|---|---|---|
| 01 | February 7, 2020 | 978-4-04-912809-3 |
Prologue: At an Early Christmas Eve Intersection – Prepare_for_Xmas_Eve! (序章 イヴの最初に交差点で Prepare_for_Xmas_Eve!); Chapter 1: Just Like an Amusement Park – Red_Wear,Big_Bag,and_Flying_Sledge. (第一章 まるで遊園地のような Red_Wear,Big_Bag,and_Flying_Sledge.); Chapter 2: A Changing Academy City, the Night Before – the_24th,Showdown. (第二章 変わる学園都市、前夜 the_24th,Showdown.); Chapter 3: A Dark Conspiracy and a Barrier Gone – Enemy_Use_XXX. (第三章 黒い陰謀と障壁の消失 Enemy_Use_XXX.); Chapter 4: Interaction with Another World, the Starting Point – "R&C OCCULTICS Co.Ltd." (第四章 異世界交流、その始点 "R&C OCCULTICS Co.Ltd."); Epilogue: Snow and Crimson Cover All – White_End.(and_Merry_Xmas!!) (終章 雪と真紅が覆い尽くす White_End.(and_Merry_Xmas!!))
Toma Kamijo, Index, and Mikoto Misaka celebrate Christmas ahead on Christmas Eve when a member of the Board of Directors instructs a Level 4 telekinetic esper to abduct Last Order to use her as a bargaining chip for the Academy City's new Board Chairman Accelerator, who plans to eliminate the city's dark side.
| 02 | July 10, 2020 | 978-4-04-913321-9 |
Prologue: The Bloody Christmas Begins – 12/24_to_12/25. (序章 血の降誕祭、開宴 12/24_to_12/25.); Chapter 1: This is the Real Battle – Home_Ground_Hospital. (第一章 実はこちらが本番 Home_Ground_Hospital.); Chapter 2: Black Pill, White Snow – and_RED_Rose. (第二章 黒の丸薬、白の雪 and_RED_Rose.); Chapter 3: In the Void of Zero – Contact_6. (第三章 ゼロの空白の中で Contact_6.); Chapter 4: The Phenomenon of Toma Kamijo – Not_Right_Hand. (第四章 上条当麻なる現象 Not_Right_Hand.); Epilogue: Greeting Through the Bars – Matching_Complete. (終章 鉄格子より挨拶を Matching_Complete.)
Kamijo is infected with the St. Germain microbe by Anna Sprengel and is confined in the Academy City's District 7 hospital on Christmas Day. Index, Misaka, and Misaki Shokuhou visit him to take care of him. After finding out that Kamijo has few days left to live, the third and fifth-most powerful Level 5 espers join forces to confront the leader of the Rosicrucian Order and C.E.O. of R&C Occultics for a cure.
| 03 | November 10, 2020 | 978-4-04-913500-8 |
Prologue: Look What I Found Under This Big Rock — OP. "Hand_Cuffs" (序章 大きな石をめくってみたらこうなった OP. "Hand_Cuffs"); Chapter 1: A Scab Torn Away – City_Warfare. (第一章 抉られたかさぶた City_Warfare.); Chapter 2: Dark Side – Ghost, Android, and... (第二章『暗部』Ghost, Android, and...); Chapter 3: Academy City's Greatest Taboo – Safety_Zero, Control_Free. (第三章 学園都市最大の禁忌 Safety_Zero, Control_Free.); Chapter 4: The Demon Lord's Young – the_LIGHT. (第四章 魔王の仔 the_LIGHT.); Epilogue: Cry of a Newborn Darkness – Over_the_C. Point, Now. (終章 闇の産声は高らかに Over_the_C. Point, Now.)
On Christmas Day, Operation Handcuffs is in effect to eliminate Academy City's dark side. Being a member of Judgment, Kuroko Shirai joins the Anti-Skill and encounters different members of the dark side. Meanwhile, Shiage Hamazura and Rikō Takitsubo, being hunted by the Anti-Skill for their involvement in the dark side, must learn the secrets of the Greatest Taboo to escape the city with the aid of the Coin of Nicholas, a magical item that grants the user's wishes.
| 04 | May 8, 2021 | 978-4-04-913730-9 |
Prologue: A Picture Book That Slipped Through the Cracks — Magic_Side,Open (序章 隙間に落ちた絵本 Magic_Side,Open); Chapter 1: The Full Population of Los Angeles is Missing — 26_the_West_Coast_Warfare. (第一章 ロサンゼルス全人口、消失 26_the_West_Coast_Warfare.); Chapter 2: Suspected and Alone – Los_Angeles. (第二章 疑わしきは一人きり Los_Angeles.); Chapter 3: The Counterattack Begins — Boy_not_"DARK". (第三章 反撃開始 Boy_not_"DARK".); Chapter 4: Beyond the Two Choice — Duel_Against_R∴C∴O (for_Save_Mother). (第四章 二者択一の外側 Duel_Against_R∴C∴O (for_Save_Mother).); Epilogue: The Return of That "Human" — Science_Side,Interrupt. (終章 その「人間」は帰還せり Science_Side,Interrupt.)
Kamijo joins Index, Stiyl Magnus, and Kaori Kanzaki in their mission to investigate the disappearance of 30 million residents of Los Angeles, California and finds the sole survivor named Helcalia Grocery as they learn the truth behind the cause and the involvement of R&C Occultics in the broken relationship between the survivor and her mother.
| 05 | December 10, 2021 | 978-4-04-914135-1 |
Prologue: Visitor from Picture Book Land – Girl_Name_is_"ALICE". (序章 絵本の国より来たる Girl_Name_is_"ALICE".); Chapter 1: A Year Ending, a Wallet Emptying, a Struggle Ensuing – Winter_Vacation. (第一章 年末、金欠、そして争奪戦 Winter_Vacation.); Chapter 2: The Puzzle of Salvation is Right in Front — Travel. (第二章 救済のパズルは目の前にある Travel.); Chapter 3: Welcome to Another World Without the Goddess's Blessings — Difficulty_the_ABYSS. (第三章 女神の加護なき異世界へようこそ Difficulty_the_ABYSS.); Chapter 4: If There Are Still People Left to Be Saved — Final_Exams_"Handcuffs". (第四章 まだ救える人が残っているならば Final_Exams_"Handcuffs".); Epilogue: Even If I Let Go of Your Hand — Not_Enemy. (終章 たとえその手は離れても Not_Enemy.)
When the eccentric Alice Anotherbible appears in Kamijo's dormitory, calling him "teacher", he finds himself dealing with end of the year financial struggles alongside questions on Alice's whimsical nature. But when the duo are caught up in the crash of the Overhunting; a train carrying prisoners arrested during the failed Operation Handcuffs, and the ensuing chaotic aftermath of the prisoners' escape; the mystery surrounding Alice and her true, shocking nature impacts Kamijo and Shirai Kuroko's pursuit of the prisoners in an unexpected way.
| 06 | April 8, 2022 | 978-4-04-914350-8 |
Prologue: Body Weight Is Surprisingly Not Dropping — Dying_Hungry. (序章 体重は意外と落ちない Dying_Hungry.); Chapter 1: Part Time Job at the End of the Year Out of Nowhere — Away_SHIBUYA,31. (第一章 飛び込め年末アルバイト Away_SHIBUYA,31.); Chapter 2: Goddess of the Night, the Moon, and the Witches — "ARADIA"×03. (第二章 夜と月と魔女達の女神 "ARADIA"×03.); Chapter 3: Blossoming of the Transcendent — Sabbat_VS_Witch_Hunt. (第三章 超絶者、開花 Sabbat_VS_Witch_Hunt.); Chapter 4: What's Wrong with Being Mere Humans — Save_the_Stray_Devil. (第四章 ただの人間で何が悪い Save_the_Stray_Devil.); Epilogue: The Needle on the Record Skips — Irregular_Counter. (終章 レコードの針が飛ぶ Irregular_Counter.)
On New Year's Eve, Kamijo, Index, and Othinus accompany Seria Kumokawa to Shibuya in hopes of Kamijo finding a job to ease his current financial situation. But when Kamijo is targeted by the Witch Goddess Aradia and saved by the Bologna Succubus; both beings known as Transcendents who are tied to Alice Anotherbible, Kamijo must fight for his survival and to help the Transcendent who saved him.
| 07 | September 9, 2022 | 978-4-04-914585-4 |
Prologue: Capture the Powerful Witch – Happy? New_Year!! (序章 力持つ魔女を捕らえよ Happy? New_Year!!); Chapter 1: Happy New Hell, Another Year of Panic – KOTATU_Syndrome. (第一章 あけまして地獄 、ことしもパニック KOTATU_Syndrome.); Chapter 2: Which of Them Was Caught? – the_Consulate. (第二章 釣り上げたのはどちらか the_Consulate.); Chapter 3: The Next Move — Witch_Trial. (第三章 次の一手 Witch_Trial.); Chapter 4: Hear the Name of Thy Ruin, World – Call_"XXXXX". (第四章 破滅の名を聞け、世界 Call_"XXXXX".); Epilogue: Saving Her Is Unconditional – Join_to…? (終章 かの者の救済は善悪を問わず Join_to......?)
Kamijo, Index, and Othinus return to Academy City on New Year's Day, having captured Aradia, unsure of what to do with her. Adding to their troubles, the Transcendents of the Bridge Builders Cabal set up a consulate within Academy City, leading to a reunion between Kamijo and Alice. With the Transcendents in conflict with each other, Kamijo takes a stand when he learns of both sides' plans for Anna Sprengel.
| 08 | May 10, 2023 | 978-4-04-915010-0 |
Prologue: The Three-way Attacks — Proclaim_ML. (序章 三つ巴が襲ってくる Proclaim_ML.); Chapter 1: I'm Tired of Running Away — Break_Through_MCV. (第一章 逃げるのはもう飽きた Break_Through_MCV.); Chapter 2: The Transcendent, Mut Thebes — the_Death_Penalty_WH. (第二章 超絶者ムト = テーベ the_Death_Penalty_WH.); Chapter 3: The Day to Hang on to R&C Occultics — Secret_DB. (第三章 R&Cオカルティクスにすがる日 Secret_DB.); Chapter 4: You Decide Which Girl to Save — Battle_of_HsB-AD-CVA01. (第四章 救う少女は自分で決めろ Battle_of_HsB-AD-CVA01.); Epilogue: End of Optimism — Catastrophe_XXX. (終章 楽観の果て Catastrophe_XXX.)
After saving Anna Sprengel alongside Aradia, Kamijo finds himself on the run from Academy City's forces, Aleister Crowley's group which includes the powerful Anna Kingsford, and the Bridge Builder's Cabal who are on the cusp of fulfilling their mysterious plans. Hoping to escape the pursuit, Kamijo's group seek to expose the Bridge Builder's Cabal's plan.
| 09 | December 8, 2023 | 978-4-04-915384-2 |
Prologue: Battle of the Best – Zenith_of_the_Magic. (序章 頂点の削り合い Zenith_of_the_Magic.); Chapter 1: Determine Your Stance – Right_or_Wicked. (第一章 スタンスを決めろ Right_or_Wicked.); Chapter 2: So Much Like Tree Rings — Open_War,1st_Defense_Line. (第二章 それはまるで年輪のような Open_War,1st Defense Line.); Chapter 3: Journey — Cut_a_Road_to_Allover_the_Goal. (第三章 踏破 Cut a Road to Allover the Goal.); Chapter 4: At the Center — Duel_and_Struggle,CRC. (第四章 中心点にて Duel_and_Struggle,CRC.); Epilogue: A Certain Truth and the Collapse of It All — Black_Humor. (終章 とある真実と全ての崩壊 Black Humor.)
After the Bridge Builder's Cabal successfully revived and then were betrayed by the legendary Magician Christian Rosenkreutz (CRC), Alice has seemingly been killed and now CRC plans to kill Anna Sprengel, who lays hospitalized due to the Shrink Drink Spiritual Item bringing her near death. Despite Sprengel's wicked actions, Kamijo manages to convince his friends and allies to help him protect her, leading them into a battle against one of the strongest Magicians in history.
| 10 | April 10, 2024 | 978-4-04-915601-0 |
Prologue: Alice Anotherbible – Back_to_Memory. (序章 アリス = アナザーバイブル Back_to_Memory.); Chapter 1: The World is Not So Strong – the_End_of_Real. (第一章 世界はそこまで強くない the_End_of_Real.); Chapter 2: Welcome to the Psychedelic – Little_Queen_Wonderland. (第二章 極彩色へようこそ Little_Queen_Wonderland.); Chapter 3: Prophecy – Last_Branch(of_Die). (第三章 予言 Last_Branch(of_Die).); Chapter 4: The Unfortunate Boy’s Focus – Over_the_River. (第四章 不幸な少年がそれでも見据えたもの Over_the_River.); Epilogue: Kamijou Touma – Notice_of_the_Death. (終章 上条当麻 Notice_of_the_Death.)
Alice Anotherbible has returned and not only has this exacerbated the recently ongoing phenomenon known as Kotatsu Syndrome, but she and her Transcendent butler H.T. Trismegistus have captured Index for their own reason. Hoping to rescue Index, Kamijo finds himself confronting Alice despite their bond, learning a dark truth about himself in the process.
| 11 | September 10, 2024 | 978-4-04-915853-3 |
Prologue: Welcome – the_DIE_After_Tomorrow. (序章 ようこそ the_DIE_After_Tomorrow.); Chapter 1: The Other Side of the Ordinary – Hell,Hades,and_Gehenna. (第一章 当たり前の反対側 Hell,Hades,and_Gehenna.); Chapter 2: Journey – What's_That_Adventurer's_Party?. (第二章 旅路 What's_That_Adventurer's_Party?); Chapter 3: The Only Lie: Answers – Seat_the_Only_One. (第三章 たった一つの嘘・解答編 Seat_the_Only_One.); Chapter 4: I Wanted to Do This with You – Duel_and_Struggle,XXX.Revenge. (第四章 お前とこうしてみたかった Duel_and_Struggle,XXX.Revenge.); Epilogue: The End of the Ritual – Flat_Line... (終章 儀式の結末 Flat_Line...)
Having died when settling his battle against Alice, Kamijo finds himself met with a chance to return to life, offered by Kingsford. To achieve this, they must go on a "Hell Tour", with the emergence from this supposed Hell being the chance to return to the world of the living. However, they soon find themselves joined by another person seeking to return to life; Johann Valentin Andreae, otherwise known as their recently slain enemy Christian Rosenkreutz.
| 12 | April 10, 2025 | 978-4-04-916226-4 |
| 13 | August 8, 2025 | 978-4-04-916533-3 |
| 14 | December 10, 2025 | 978-4-04-916707-8 |
| 15 | May 9, 2026 | 978-4-04-916966-9 |
| 16 | September 10, 2026 | 978-4-04-952300-3 |

== Short stories ==
=== A Certain Magical Index SS (2007–2008) ===
| No. | Original release date | Original ISBN | English release date | English ISBN |
|---|---|---|---|---|
| 1 | July 10, 2007 | 978-4-8402-3912-7 | November 17, 2020 | 978-1-9753-1797-3 |
Prologue: The Calm Before the Start of War – Breakfast. (序章 開戦前の穏やかな一日 Breakfast.); Chapter 1: Pot with Meat and the Appetite for Great Tactics – A_Required_Thing. (第一章 鍋と肉と食欲の大戦術 A_Required_Thing.); Chapter 2: A Dull Gray Alley – Skill_Out. (第二章 灰色の無味乾燥な路地 Skill_Out.); Chapter 3: Women's Dorm of the Anglican Church – Russian_Roulette. (第三章 イギリス清教の女子寮 Russian_Roulette.); Chapter 4: A Drunk Mother's Circumstances – The_Two_Leading_Roles. (第四章 酔っ払った母親の事情 The_Two_Leading_Roles.); Epilogue: A Single Will and a Small Key – The_Present_Target. (終章 一つの意志と小さな鍵 The_Present_Target.)
A series of short stories set before the events of the fourteenth volume of A Certain Magical Index light novel series, including the formation of Academy City's dark side organization GROUP and the assassination attempt on Misuzu Misaka.
| 2 | November 10, 2008 | 978-4-04-867342-6 | March 2, 2021 | 978-1-9753-1799-7 |
Chapter 1: Those Who Seek Bundles of Cash and a Battle – The Third Friday of January. (第一章 札束とバトルを求める者達 一月、第三金曜日); Chapter 2: A Warrior and Dancer from Norse Mythology – The First Friday of February. (第二章 北欧神話圏の戦士と踊り子 二月、第一金曜日); Chapter 3: A Father's Wish Creates a Point of Contact and an Interaction – The Fourth Friday of February. (第三章 父の願いは接点と交流を 二月、第四金曜日); Chapter 4: The True Strength of the Seventh of the Seven – The Third Friday of March. (第四章 七人の内の七番目の実力は 三月、第三金曜日); Chapter 5: What Is It that the World Lacks? – The First Friday of April. (第五章 世界に足りないものは何か 四月、第一金曜日); Chapter 6: Getting to the Heart of the Discussion at the Beauty Salon – The Fourth Friday of April. (第六章 美容院にて世間話と核心を 四月、第四金曜日); Chapter 7: Someone Behind the Scenes is Unprepared and Has to Clean Up – The Second Friday of May. (第七章 ある黒幕の下準備と後始末 五月、第二金曜日); Chapter 8: A Kunoichi Is Someone Who Appears Unexpectedly – The Fourth Friday of May. (第八章 くノ一は突然出現するもの 五月、第四金曜日); Chapter 9: The Relations of the Real World Are Unneeded in the Electric World – The Second Friday of June. (第九章 電子に現世の関係性は不要 六月、第二金曜日); Chapter 10: Would You Accept or Decline an Invitation for the Night? – The First Friday of July. (第一〇章 一夜の誘いは乗るか蹴るか 七月、第一金曜日); Chapter 11: Every Field Has Exceptions – The Second Friday of July. (第一一章 例外はどんな分野にもある 七月、第二金曜日); Chapter 12: A Debate Between a Sniper and a Bomber – The Fourth Friday of July. (第一二章 狙撃手と爆弾魔による討論 七月、第四金曜日); Chapter 13: The Accuracy of Their Collective Fortunes – The Fourth Friday of August. (第一三章 彼女達の集団的占いの精度 八月、第四金曜日); Chapter 14: The Dance Between Gatekeeper and Intruder – The Third Friday of September. (第一四章 門番と侵入者は踊り踊られ 九月、第三金曜日); Chapter 15: Art Is Divided Between Geniuses and Eccentrics – The Fourth Friday of September. (第一五章 芸術は天才と変人を分ける 九月、第四金曜日); Chapter 16: There Is a Reason They Do Not Look Like Mothers – The Fifth Friday of September. (第一六章 母に見えないのは訳がある 九月、第五金曜日); Chapter 17: B Movies and Unpolished Gemstones – The First Friday of October. (第一七章 B級映画と未研磨の原石 一〇月、第一金曜日); Chapter 18: Worthy of Carrying On That Name – The First Friday of October. (第一八章 その名を継ぐにふさわしき 一〇月、第一金曜日); Chapter 19: Shining Gemstones and Bloodstained Rights – The Second Friday of October. (第一九章 輝く原石と血みどろの利権 一〇月、第二金曜日); Chapter 20: How to Respond to a Number of Simultaneous Tragedies – The Second Friday of October. (第二〇章 複数同時悲劇への対応とは 一〇月、第二金曜日); Chapter 21: Those with an Undetermined Identity – The Second Friday of October. (第二一章 正体など判断できない者達 一〇月、第二金曜日); Chapter 22: The Conclusion Cannot Be Grasped Individually – The Second Friday of October. (第二二章 個人にその結末は掴めない 一〇月、第二金曜日)
A series of short stories involving magic and science sides, which takes place on various Fridays: Shiage Hamazura, Ritoku Komaba, and Hanzō Hattori are pursued by Aiho Yomikawa after they stole an ATM; Kaori Kanzaki meets the self-proclaimed Valkyrie called the Jeans Slasher; Tōya Kamijo travels to Italy and plans to purchase good luck charms for his son when he meets Lidvia Lorenzetti; Gunha Sogīta saves a young man from Skill-Out members; Tabigake Misaka meets a young Latin girl named Ines while on his business trip in Brazil; Kuroko Shirai visits the hair salon designated by the Tokiwadai Middle School; Ollerus saves 100 children from human trafficking and returns home with them in the apartment he shared with Sylvia; Hamazura meets Kuruwa, who is looking for Hattori, and they discuss the latter's connection to ninja; a cyber hacker is caught by Anti-Skill after he got traced by the legendary hacker known as "Goalkeeper", who turns out to be Kazari Uiharu; Tōya and Tabigake drink beers together in a bar at London; Seria Kumokawa and Tsugutoshi Kaizumi discuss the situation of Gemstones around the world; and Ollerus defeats some of Misaka clones and then encounters Sogīta while looking for Gemstones in Academy City.

=== A Certain Magical Index SP (2011) ===
| No. | Release date | ISBN |
|---|---|---|
| 1 | August 10, 2011 | 978-4-04-870775-6 |
Stiyl Magnus (ステイル = マグヌス); Mark Space (マーク = スペース); Toma Kamijo (上条当麻); Kazari Uiharu (初春飾利)
A collection of four previously released short stories, each based around different characters: Stiyl Magnus, Mark Space, Toma Kamijo, and Kazari Uiharu.

=== A Certain Magical Index: Apocrypha Archive (2020–2025) ===
| No. | Release date | ISBN |
|---|---|---|
| 01 | June 10, 2020 | 978-4-04-913201-4 |
Toaru Majutsu no Index SS: Kanzaki Kaori; Toaru Majutsu no Index: Road to Endymion; Toaru Majutsu no Index SS: Necessarius Special Admission Test
Toaru Majutsu no Index SS: Kanzaki Kaori: Kaori Kanzaki goes on seemingly unrelated missions for Necessarius. However, the missions all end up relating to a Saint and Valkyrie named Brunhild Eiktobel who tries to construct the Gungnir as means of saving a seemingly helpless boy. Toaru Majutsu no Index: Road to Endymion: A prequel to A Certain Magical Index: The Movie – The Miracle of Endymion. The novel entails Tōma Kamijō, Index, and Stiyl Magnus battling a magic cabal with deadly plans after they infiltrated Academy City. However, not everything is as it seems. Toaru Majutsu no Index SS: Necessarius Special Admission Test: The Amakusas take a test to become official members of Necessarius. However, a conspiracy begins building around them and brands them as traitors. Now, the group must fight for their innocence and to foil the plans of the true enemy behind the conspiracy.
| 02 | August 7, 2020 | 978-4-04-913202-1 |
Toaru Kagaku no Railgun SS: Liberal Arts City; Toaru Kagaku no Railgun SS2: Ability Demonstration Trip; Toaru Kagaku no Railgun: Cold Game
Toaru Kagaku no Railgun SS: Liberal Arts City: Academy City launches a student exchange program that allows its students to be sent to the outside world from September 3rd to 10th. Mikoto Misaka, Kuroko Shirai, Kazari Uiharu, and Ruiko Saten are in Liberal Arts City, an artificial island off the west coast of the United States, when an Aztec magic cabal called "Return of the Winged One" arrives. Toaru Kagaku no Railgun SS2: Ability Demonstration Trip: Academy City sends Mikoto to a shopping mall in Russia for an ability demonstration, where she meets a member of the New Light magic cabal named Lessar. Toaru Kagaku no Railgun: Cold Game: Mikoto, Kuroko, Kazari, and Ruiko become involved in the Cold Sleep Murder Case, a case that involves a serial killer abducting a small girl and placing her below an ice skating rink using cold sleep methods, during their trip to an Anti-Skill station
| 03 | December 10, 2024 | 978-4-04-916055-0 |
Toaru Majutsu no Index SS: Agnese's Magic Side Work Experience; Toaru Majutsu no Index SS: Biohacker
Toaru Majutsu no Index SS: Agnese's Magic Side Work Experience: Agnese Sanctis and members of Agnese Forces have joined the Church of England. They must do some odd jobs given by Stiyl, such as holding a mass, proselyting and even doing cleanup after a magic battle, to prove their place even as freeloaders. Toaru Kagaku no Index SS: Biohacker: In his third-year middle school days, Tōma Kamijō meets Ayu Mitsuari, a student from Tokiwadai Middle School with an ability called "Mental Stinger", and Seria Kumokawa, a high school student who could control people's minds without any power. Tōma must protect the girls as they get involved in Academy City's deep darkness.
| 04 | February 7, 2025 | 978-4-04-916225-7 |
Toaru Kagaku no Railgun SS3: Stativarius; A Truly Crazy Way to Get Misaka Mikoto and Shokuhou Misaki to Flirt
Toaru Kagaku no Railgun SS3: Stativarius: Mikoto Misaka and Kuroko Shirai accept a violin challenge from Yuri Sakibasu, a member of Misaki Shokuhō's clique. They seek help from Kazari Uiharu and Ruiko Saten to unveil the secrets of Stativarius (a pun to the actual string instrument).

== Crossover ==
=== A Certain Magical Index × Cyber Troopers Virtual-On: A Certain Magical Virtual-On ===
| No. | Release date | ISBN |
|---|---|---|
| 1 | May 10, 2016 | 978-4-04-865945-1 |
Prologue; Chapters 1–4; Epilogue
A game known as Virtual On, about giant "Virtualoid" robots who do battle, takes Academy City by storm. When he is introduced to the game by Index, Tōma Kamijō soon gets caught up in a conspiracy surrounding the game and a girl named Ririn Furashina, which threatens Academy City and the lives of all the students in it.
