= \\ =

The sequence of two backslashes, \\, may represent:

- The prefix of a Microsoft Windows UNC pathname
- An escaped backslash character

== See also ==
- // (disambiguation)
