= Christopher Lello =

English cricketer

Personal information
- Full name: Christopher Paul Lello
- Born: 23 March 1971 (age 55); Penzance, Cornwall, England
- Batting: Left-handed
- Bowling: Right-arm medium

Domestic team information
- Years: Team
- 1994-2000: Cornwall

Career statistics
Competition	LA
Matches	3
Runs scored	37
Batting average	12.33
100s/50s	–/–
Top score	20
Balls bowled	48
Wickets	1
Bowling average	55.00
5 wickets in innings	–
10 wickets in match	–
Best bowling	1/43
Catches/stumpings	2/–
- Source: Cricinfo, 17 October 2010

Christopher Paul Lello (born 23 February 1971) is a former English cricketer. Lello was a left-handed batsman who bowled right-arm medium pace. He was born at Penzance, Cornwall.

Lello made his Minor Counties Championship debut for Cornwall in 1994 against Wiltshire. From 1994 to 2000, he represented the county in 30 Minor Counties Championship matches, the last of which came against Cheshire. Lello also represented Cornwall in the MCCA Knockout Trophy. His debut in that competition came against Wales Minor Counties in 1996. From 1996 to 2000, he represented the county in 6 Trophy matches, the last of which came against Devon.

Lello also represented Cornwall in 3 List A matches. These came against Warwickshire in the 1996 NatWest Trophy, Cumberland in the 1999 NatWest Trophy and Norfolk in the 2000 NatWest Trophy. In his 3 List A matches, he scored 20 runs at a batting average of 12.33, with a high score of 20. In the field he took 2 catches. With the ball he took a single wicket at a bowling average of 55.00, with best figures of 1/43.
