= Vertical bar (disambiguation) =

Vertical bar | and vertical bars ‖ are typographical symbols.

They may also refer to:

- Chōonpu, a character in vertical Japanese writing, ー
- Dental click, ǀ
- Lateral click, a character in African languages, ǁ
- Parallel (geometry), ∥
- Parallel (operator), also ∥
- Logical disjunction, || in several programming languages
