= Alessandro Di Lello =

Italian Paralympic athlete

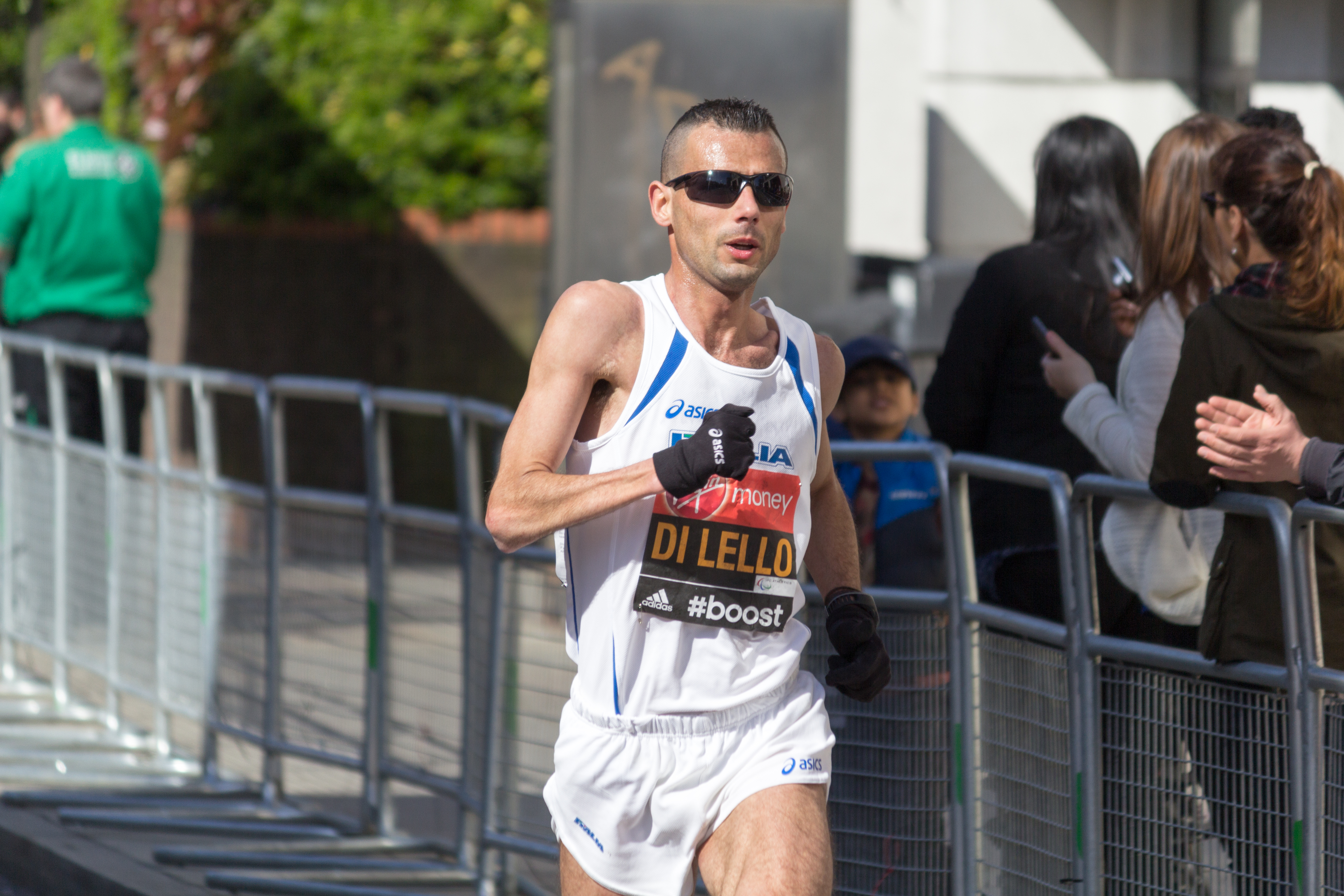
- Di Lello at the 2014 London Marathon

Personal information
- Full name: Alessandro Di Lello
- Nationality: Italian
- Born: 18 July 1977 (age 48) Tivoli, Italy

Sport
- Country: Italy
- Sport: Athletics
- Event: T46 Marathon
- Club: Athletic Terni

Achievements and titles
- Paralympic finals: 2012
Medal record
Track and field (athletics)
Representing Italy
IPC World Championships
Gold medal – first place	2013 Lyon	Marathon - T46

Alessandro Di Lello (born 18 July 1977) is a Paralympic athlete from Italy competing mainly in category T46 long distance events. In 2012 Di Lello won the marathon at the IPC World Championships and followed this with victory in the T46 classification at the 2013 London Marathon.

== Sports career ==
Di Lello first began running in an attempt to lose weight, and in 1992 he started competing in long distance races. A motor bike accident resulted in a muscle impairment and Di Lello was subsequently classified as a T46 parasport athlete. One of the first major competitions he entered was the 2009 New York Marathon, but he was forced to retire from the event with an Achilles tendon inflammation. In 2012 he competed alongside fellow countryman Walter Endrizzi in the Summer Paralympics in London. Di Lello finished 8th with a time of 2.46:27.

The next year Di Lello competed in T46 marathon at the 2013 IPC Athletics World Championships in Lyon. Di Lello ran a time of 2:33.42 to take the gold ahead of Portugal's Pedro Meza. 2013 also saw Di Lello win the T44-46 category in the London Marathon with a time of 2:32.06.
