= The Unexplored Summon://Blood-Sign =

Japanese light novel series

- First light novel volume cover featuring the character Shiroki Joou

未踏召喚://ブラッドサイン (Mitō Shōkan://Buraddo Sain)
- Genre: Fantasy
- Light novel
- Written by: Kazuma Kamachi
- Illustrated by: Waki Ikawa
- Published by: ASCII Media Works
- Imprint: Dengeki Bunko
- Original run: September 10, 2014 – June 8, 2019
- Volumes: 10

The Unexplored Summon://Blood-Sign (Japanese: 未踏召喚://ブラッドサイン, Hepburn: Mitō Shōkan://Buraddo Sain) is a Japanese light novel series written by Kazuma Kamachi and illustrated by Waki Ikawa. ASCII Media Works have published ten volumes from 2014 to 2019 under their Dengeki Bunko label.

== Characters ==
Kyousuke Shiroyama (城山恭介, Shiroyama Kyōsuke)
An ace summoner of considerable talent from one of the three main summoner factions, Freedom, but he's considering retiring from the summoning business. However, he constantly suffers from an uncontrollable urge to assist those who ask him for help that prevents him from doing so.
The "White" Queen who Wields the Sword of Unsullied Truth (iu – nu – fb – a – wuh – ei –kx – eu – pl – vjz) (穢れなき真実の剣持つ「白き」女王, Kegarenaki shinjitsu no ken motsu `shiroki' Jo'ou)
The strongest Unexplored-class Material, one of the beings said to lurk "beyond the realm of the gods".

== Media ==
=== Light novel ===
The first light novel volume was published on September 10, 2014, by ASCII Media Works under their Dengeki Bunko imprint. As of June 2019, ten volumes have been published.

No.	Japanese release date	Japanese ISBN
1	September 10, 2014	978-4-04-866861-3
2	January 10, 2015	978-4-04-869164-2
3	August 8, 2015	978-4-04-865310-7
4	January 9, 2016	978-4-04-865660-3
5	June 10, 2016	978-4-04-892116-9
6	December 10, 2016	978-4-04-892550-1
7	June 9, 2017	978-4-04-892951-6
8	February 10, 2018	978-4-04-893678-1
9	November 10, 2018	978-4-04-912166-7
10	June 8, 2019	978-4-04-912566-5
