= Lello//Arnell =

Lello//Arnell is a collaborative duo of contemporary artists Jørgen Craig Lello (born 1978) and Tobias Arnell (born 1978). Having met at the National Academy of Fine Arts, they started collaborating in 2003. They live and work in Oslo, Norway.

According to their artist statement, they "utilize logically broken lines of thought, false statements and fictional scenarios in their examination of how the world is interpreted and understood".

They have participated in exhibitions such as the Norwegian Sculpture Biennal (2006) at the Vigeland Museum, Lights On: norsk samtidskunst at the Astrup Fearnley Museum of Modern Art and the Biennale of Graphic Art at the International Center of Graphic Arts in Ljubljana, Slovenia.

== Representation ==
In 2009 they entered into a collaboration with Galleri Erik Steen in Oslo. They have had two solo exhibitions at Galleri Erik Steen: Rediscovery in 2008 and The Charlatan Mind in 2011.
