= A Certain Scientific Railgun season 3 =

2020 Japanese television season

A Certain Scientific Railgun T
- Season 3
- First home media volume cover, featuring Kuroko Shirai (L) and Mikoto Misaka (R)
- Starring: Rina Satō; Satomi Arai; Aki Toyosaki; Kanae Itō; Azumi Asakura
- No. of episodes: 25

Release
- Original network: AT-X
- Original release: January 10 – September 25, 2020

Season chronology
- ← Previous; Season 2: S

The third season of the Japanese animated television series A Certain Scientific Railgun, marketed as A Certain Scientific Railgun T, is based on the manga series of the same name written by Kazuma Kamachi and illustrated by Motoi Fuyukawa. The season follows Mikoto Misaka teaming up with Misaki Shokuhō to stop the plans of Academy City's dark side during Daihasei Festival. Produced by J.C.Staff, the season was directed by Tatsuyuki Nagai with series composition supervised by Shōgo Yasukawa.

A Certain Scientific Railgun T sees the return of the main cast members Rina Satō, Satomi Arai, Aki Toyosaki, and Kanae Itō. Azumi Asakura joins them as Shokuhō, whom she also voiced in the first and final episodes of A Certain Scientific Railgun S. Production of the third season was announced in October 2018, with Nagai returning as the director. Yasukawa was confirmed as the head of series composition for the season in September 2019.

The third season consists of 25 episodes and ran on AT-X from January 10 to September 25, 2020, with other networks following days later. Several episodes got delayed due to the COVID-19 pandemic, which caused the season to conclude a full three months later than originally scheduled. The series was announced to be renewed for a fourth season in February 2025.

== Episodes ==
No. overall	No. in season	Title	Directed by	Written by	Storyboarded by	Original release date
49	1	"Super-Powered (Level 5)"; Transliteration: "Chō Nōryoku-sha (Reberu Faibu)" (Japanese: 超能力者(レベル5))	Kazuki Horiguchi	Shōgo Yasukawa	Tatsuyuki Nagai	January 10, 2020
In the run-up to the Daihasei Sports Festival, Mikoto Misaka, along with other Level 5 espers, is approached with the offer of giving the athlete's pledge during the festival's opening ceremony. Meanwhile, when a fight breaks out between cheer squads over the use of the main stage, Kazari Uiharu steps in to try and stop them. This attracts the attention of the seventh-ranked Level 5 esper, Gunha Sogīta, who ends up causing more harm than good with his powerful yet unknown ability. As Kazari and Ruiko Saten try to save the civilians, Mikoto steps in to protect them from falling wreckage. In the end, as the offer are declined by Accelerator, Teitoku Kakine (the second-ranked Level 5 esper), Shizuri Mugino, and Mikoto, the representative roles are given to Gunha and Misaki Shokuhō, the latter of which shows an interest in the Sisters.
50	2	"The Daihasei Festival"; Transliteration: "Daihasei-sai" (Japanese: 大覇星祭)	Yoshihiro Mori	Shōgo Yasukawa	Yūichi Nihei	January 17, 2020
Following some explosive improv from Gunha, the Daihasei Festival begins with a three-legged race, with Mitsuko Kongō pairing up with Mikoto in place of the injured Kuroko Shirai. While Mikoto goes to change her outfit after winning her race, Misaka 10032 is mistaken for Mikoto and brought to take part in Tokiwadai's next event, Balloon Hunter, where someone has his sights set on her.
51	3	"Balloon Hunter"; Transliteration: "Barūn Hantā" (Japanese: バルーンハンター)	Yūsuke Onoda	Shōgo Yasukawa	Shingo Yuki	January 24, 2020
Tokiwadai begins the Balloon Hunter event against the opposing school, who gains an early lead due to intel on Tokiwadai's espers provided by MEMBER operative Yoshio Baba. Believing Misaka 10032 to be Mikoto, Yoshio sends his teammates to gang up on her while he sends a robotic mosquito to inject her with a nanodevice. After the event ends in Tokiwadai's defeat, Mikoto goes to have lunch with her mother Misuzu Misaka, having a run-in with Toma Kamijo and Misaki while getting drinks, while Ruiko and Kazari decide to search for a rumored metal known as Shadow Metal. Meanwhile, Misaka 10032 collapses from the nanodevice, at which point she is discovered by Misaki.
52	4	"Tampering"; Transliteration: "Kaizan" (Japanese: 改竄)	Makoto Sokuza	Shōgo Yasukawa	N/A	January 31, 2020
Mikoto rushes in to rescue Ruiko from some suited people as she searches one of the unused grounds for Shadow Metal, only to discover they were simply security officers doing their job. Meanwhile, Kazari uses her hacking skills to discover the site that Ruiko got the rumor about Shadow Metal, keeping what she learned to herself. The next day, Mikoto discovers that Misaka 10032 has gone missing, learning that she was taken away by an ambulance whose drivers were being manipulated by Misaki. After failing to get any answers out of the drivers, Mikoto finds herself being placed under the guard of Misaki's clique before discovering that Kuroko, Ruiko, and Kazari have all had their memories of her stolen from them by Misaki.
53	5	"Trust"; Transliteration: "Shinrai" (Japanese: 信頼)	Toshikazu Hashimoto	Atsuo Ishino	Toshikazu Hashimoto	February 7, 2020
Mitsuko, who was able to recognize Misaka 10032 as a different person, learns from Mikoto about Misaki's wrongdoings and decides to search for Misaka 10032 in her stead. Finding a cat at the scene of Misaka 10032's disappearance, Mitsuko learns that it belonged to the sister from Kinuho Wannai, who goes to fetch another esper who can help understand animals. This attracts the attention of Yoshio, who lures Mitsuko away and sends a group of robotic dogs to attack her. Yoshio manages to hit Mitsuko with a disabling nanodevice, but she is saved by the arrival of Kinuho and Ma'aya Awatsuki, who asks Ruiko to look after Mitsuko and the cat while they face off against him.
54	6	"The Battle Begins"; Transliteration: "Kaisen" (Japanese: 開戦)	Kōsaku Taniguchi & Yūsuke Onoda	Hiroki Uchida	Kōichirō Sohtome & Tatsuyuki Nagai	February 14, 2020
Yoshio uses the lure of the nanomachine, which could potentially be used to help Mitsuko, to split up Kinuho and Ma'aya. Meanwhile, Ruiko brings Mitsuko to the hospital, where Mikoto discovers her condition and angrily breaks away from Misaki's clique. Yoshio tries to overwhelm Kinuho by taking her away from the water source so she can't use her Hydro Hand ability, but she takes advantage of the water she carried through an underground drain to defeat him. He attempts to use the nanomachine mosquito against Kinuho but is thwarted by Ma'aya's ability to manipulate buoyancy. Yoshio runs off and brings out his most powerful robot, but it is easily destroyed by Mikoto, who threatens him to never approach her friends ever again.
55	7	"Auribus oculi fideliores sunt. (The eyes are more trustworthy than the ears)" Transliteration: "Ōribazu okarī fideriarezu santo. (Miru koto wa kiku koto yori shinjiru ni ataisuru)" (Japanese: Auribus oculi fideliores sunt.(見ることは聞くことより信じるに値する))	Yoshihiro Mori	Shinichi Inotsume	Yūichi Nihei	February 28, 2020 (Note: This episode was delayed from its original scheduled airing date of February 21, 2020, due to the COVID-19 pandemic. Subsequent episodes would be delayed by another two weeks.)
With the help of an esper, Kinuho, Ma'aya, and Ruiko learn some of the circumstances of Misaka 10032's disappearance from the cat. Just as Mikoto receives this information from Ruiko, she is approached by a girl named Mitori Kōzaku, who has taken both Kazari and Misuzu hostage. As Kuroko arrives to help Mikoto rescue both hostages, they discover Mitori's partner is a mass of liquid metal controlled by her ability. After getting Kazari and Misuzu to safety, Ruiko explains that something Misaki mentioned in the cat's memories relates to the urban legend site she looked at before. Realizing that Kazari must've investigated it, Mikoto reconstructs the site's data, revealing information about Misaki.
56	8	"Railgun × Mental Out"; Transliteration: "Rērugan × Mentaru Auto" (Japanese: 超電磁砲(レールガン)×心理掌握(メンタルアウト))	Makoto Sokuza	Shōgo Yasukawa	Kouichi Takada	March 20, 2020
Mikoto tracks down Misaki, who reveals she had hidden Misaka 10032 to keep her safe from the group pursuing the Sisters to access the Misaka Network. She further reveals that the man behind it is Gensei Kihara, who was the advocate of the Level 6 Shift Project and Misaki's worst enemy. As the two of them head towards a conference building where Gensei awaits, Kuroko, Kazari, and Ruiko look for information about Mitori.
57	9	"Kōzaku Mitori" (Japanese: 警策看取(こうざくみとり))	Ryūta Kawahara	Shōgo Yasukawa	Ryūta Kawahara	March 27, 2020
While Mikoto and Misaki take their approaches in infiltrating Gensei's headquarters, Kuroko and Kazari head to the Bank Control Center to look for more information about Mitori. They find out that she is declared dead 2 years ago. Meanwhile, Ruiko lends her good luck charm to Tōma for a scavenger hunt, after which she spots an abandoned factory that once produced the liquid metal Mitori controlled, finding it is still in use. Ruiko is caught by Mitori's liquid metal clone but is rescued by MEMBER affiliate Xochitl, who realized Mitori had been using her and Yoshio. Mikoto and Misaki allegedly find Gensei, only to discover it to be a decoy in disguise to distract them while forces are sent to attack the building where Misaka 10032 is being kept.
58	10	"Clone Dolly"; Transliteration: "Kurōn Dorī" (Japanese: 才人工房(クローンドリー))	Yuuki Nagasawa & Takayuki Kuriyama	Shinichi Inotsume	Yūichi Nihei	April 3, 2020
As Misaki is forced to use a power booster called Exterior to push her abilities to the limits and get through a traffic jam, she recalls her time in a training facility. Here, she was asked by scientists to use her powers to have a clone named Dolly recognize her as her friend Mi. After Dolly suddenly died, Misaki learned that the scientists were planning to use the Exterior Project to allow anyone to use Mental Out, leading her to brainwash the entire personnel to keep it under control. As Mikoto and Misaki arrive at the facility, where it is revealed Exterior is formed from a piece of Misaki's brain, Gensei manages to attune his waves to the Exterior to undo the protection on Misaka 10032 and plant a virus into the Misaka Network. It is then that Gensei commences his true experiment, using the energy formed from the virus to forcibly attempt to turn Mikoto into a Level 6 esper.
59	11	"Joining the Battle"; Transliteration: "Sansen" (Japanese: 参戦)	Yōsuke Yamamoto	Atsuo Ishino	Hideki Tachibana & Kazuki Horiguchi	April 10, 2020
Tōma, having learned about the situation from Xochitl, is given instructions from Misaki on how to deal with Mikoto, who is manipulated by Mitori's usage of Misaki's powers into attacking the Windowless Building. After Kuroko arrives and gets Misaka 10032 to safety, she is tasked with finding Mitori to stop her control on Mikoto, facing up against her metal puppet along the way. As Gunha arrives on the scene to assist Tōma in stopping Mikoto, Misaki goes to confront Gensei himself.
60	12	"Exterior"; Transliteration: "Ekusuteria" (Japanese: 外装代脳(エクステリア))	Yoshihiro Mori	Hiroki Uchida	Hideki Tachibana & Tetsuya Yanagisawa	April 17, 2020
Realizing Gensei is trying to obtain the limiter unlock code for Exterior from her to control Mikoto further, Misaki attempts to trap him only to discover he possesses Multiskill, allowing him to use multiple abilities. Meanwhile, Kuroko begins to close in on Mitori, facing tougher opposition from the puppet. Misaki sets up a multi-phase trap to try and stop Gensei, but he manages to see through every step, ultimately managing to get past Misaki's mental defenses and obtain the code.
61	13	"SYSTEM (Those Who Arrive at Heaven's Will in an Only Human Body)"; Transliteration: "SHISUTEMU (Kaminaranumi nite Tenjō no Ishi ni Tadoritsuku Mono)" (Japanese: SYSTEM(神ならぬ身にて天上の意志に辿り着くもの))	Daizou Yase & Akari Ranzaki	Shōgo Yasukawa	Kazuo Takigawa, Kōichirō Sohtome & Tatsuyuki Nagai	May 1, 2020 (Note: This episode was delayed from its original scheduled airing date of April 24, 2020, due to the COVID-19 pandemic)
After Kazari discovers that Mitori had hijacked an Anti-Skill camera drone to help control her liquid metal clone, she hijacks the camera herself to fake Kuroko's death, allowing the real Kuroko to find Mitori hiding in the sewers and take her down. Meanwhile, Gensei discovers too late that the input code he got from Misaki was Exterior's self-destruct code, which Misaki had tricked him into using by rewriting her memory. With Exterior destroyed, Mikoto regains her senses but is still unable to stop her power from going out of control.
62	14	"Dragon Strike (Jaw of the Dragon King)"; Transliteration: "Doragon Sutoraiku (Ryūō no Ago)" (Japanese: 竜王の顎(ドラゴンストライク))	Shuuji Miyazaki	Shōgo Yasukawa	Hideki Tachibana	May 15, 2020 (Note: This episode was delayed from its original scheduled airing date of May 8, 2020, due to the COVID-19 pandemic)
Working along with Gunha, Tōma uses the power that lies beyond Imagine Breaker, finally stopping Mikoto's rampage and returning her to normal. Afterward, Mikoto goes to visit Mitsuko, who feels happy upon hearing that Kinuho and Ma'aya came to her aid. After restoring the memories of Kuroko and the others, while rewriting others of the whole incident to appear like a terrorist attack, Misaki approaches Mitori. As the Daihasei Festival comes to a close without further incident, Ruiko arranges for Mikoto to dance with Tōma.
63	15	"Promise"; Transliteration: "Yakusoku" (Japanese: やくそく)	Kiyoko Sayama	Shōgo Yasukawa	Kiyoko Sayama	May 22, 2020
Mitori recalls her time in a facility where she ended up being befriended by Dolly before she met with Misaki. After discovering that Dolly was a clone that was being fed experimental drugs, she was caught and confined for several months, leading to a building hatred towards the governing board. In the present, Misaki brings Mitori to meet Dolly's "little sister" that has inherited her memories, leading to a touching reunion between the three of them.
64	16	"Dream Ranker"; Transliteration: "Dorīmu Rankā" (Japanese: 天賦夢路(ドリームランカー))	Kazuki Horiguchi & Makoto Sokuza	Shinichi Inotsume	Kazuki Horiguchi	July 24, 2020 (Note: This episode was delayed from its original scheduled airing date of May 29, 2020, due to the COVID-19 pandemic)
Junko Hokaze, a member of Misaki's clique, gives Mikoto an Indian Poker card that allegedly lets people experience other people's dreams. Trying out the card for herself, Mikoto experiences Junko's dream, which turns out to be less pleasant than she originally expected. The next day, Junko tries holding a tea party to help Mikoto and Misaki get along, but they become angered after overhearing a certain blue-haired boy giving out cards based on his dubious fantasies of them. Meanwhile, Kuroko and Kazari look into an app that allegedly shows the location of accidents before they happen. Scouting out the location of one of these future accidents, Kuroko saves someone from a traffic accident at that very location. Kuroko then confronts a precognitive esper boy named Shaei Miyama, who states that he created the app so he could find an esper that can prevent these accidents from happening.
65	17	"Precognition"; Transliteration: "Yochi" (Japanese: 予知)	Yoshihiro Mori	Shinichi Inotsume	Yūichi Nihei	July 31, 2020
Working together, Kuroko manages to use her teleportation to prevent more accidents predicted by Shaei's precognitions. As Judgment takes countermeasures to prevent multiple potential accidents predicted to happen near each other at the park, Shaei collapses as a result of overusing his ability. At the predicted time, cherry blossom trees suddenly set ablaze, which Kuroko deduces is due to a chemical that was injected into them to bloom all year round. As Kuroko works to save civilians, Shaei desperately asks Kuroko to save a stray dog named Perro, which she manages to do. After learning that the ones who created the chemical learned it from Indian Poker, Kuroko encourages Shaei to approach her again once he has better control of his ability.
66	18	"Bust Upper"; Transliteration: "Basuto Appā" (Japanese: 巨乳御手(バストアッパー))	Sho Kitamura	Shōgo Yasukawa	Yoshiki Yamakawa	August 7, 2020
Coming across an Indian Poker trader on the street, Saiai Kinuhata, one of the ITEM's members with a complex about her figure, fights with Mikoto over a card relating to something called the "Bust Upper". After their fight causes all the cards to become mixed up, Mikoto and Saiai, realizing they have the same goal, purchase all the cards and try them out one by one in search of the Bust Upper. Despite trying out all the cards, including one that gives Mikoto a rather foreboding dream, the pair are unable to find the Bust Upper, as it is stolen by a crow during their sleep and falls into the hands of another girl.
67	19	"Strange Coincidence"; Transliteration: "Kien" (Japanese: 奇縁)	Akari Ranzaki	Shōgo Yasukawa	Kouichi Takada	August 14, 2020
After Ruiko ends up buying the last cans of mackerel she wanted to buy, Frenda Seivelun tries to get some off of her and ends up having dinner with her, leading the two of them to become friends. Sometime later, as Ruiko buys herself another Indian Poker card, a group called SCHOOL looking for a card about something called Tweezers arrange for her to be kidnapped, prompting Frenda to go and rescue her. After the kidnap attempt is foiled, SCHOOL calls upon the sniper Rakko Yumiya to hunt down Ruiko and Frenda.
68	20	"Ha det bra"	Makoto Sokuza, Takayuki Kuriyama & Yuuki Nagasawa	Hiroki Uchida	Yūichi Nihei	August 21, 2020
Despite dealing multiple shots to Frenda as she pursues them into a shopping mall, Yumiya falls for a trap by Frenda and Ruiko, exposing herself as their pursuer. While Ruiko escapes with the other customers, Frenda faces off against Yumiya in a one-on-one duel, winning against her using her bombs. As SCHOOL, led by Teitoku, plan their next move regarding the tweezers, Ruiko never hears from Frenda again.
69	21	"Doppelganger"; Transliteration: "Dopperugengā" (Japanese: ドッペルゲンガー)	Shuuji Miyazaki	Shinichi Inotsume	Shuuji Miyazaki	August 28, 2020
Misaki looks into Ryōko Kuriba, who allegedly came up with the plans for Indian Poker. She learns that Ryōko was part of her experiment using cyborg technology to turn her into two people before being rejoined to determine if a soul could be created. As Mikoto is sent by Misaki to investigate the results of the experiments, the cyborg Doppelganger of Ryōko left after the experiment, who believed herself to be human, experiences an identity crisis and breaks out of her facility. Mikoto and Misaki then confront the original Ryōko about the threat Doppelganger poses, while another underground group known as Scavenger is dispatched to hunt down Doppelganger.
70	22	"Scavenger"; Transliteration: "Sukabenjā" (Japanese: 屍喰部隊(スカベンジャー))	Katsushi Sakurabi	Shinichi Inotsume	Yoshimitsu Ohashi	September 4, 2020
Ryōko states that she believes destroying Doppelganger's body could cause calamity to befall Academy City, leading her to invent Indian Poker as a means to crowdsource a solution. Later on, Ryōko is confronted by Doppelganger, before Scavenger shows up to try and detain Doppelganger. As the other members struggle again with Doppelganger's power, Ryōko is pursued by Tarōmaru Seike but is rescued by Mikoto after she learns that Ryōko created Doppelganger as a means to save her mother. Upon receiving heavy damage to her body, Doppelganger begins to absorb other forms of matter to repair herself and become more powerful, at which point Mikoto, having just defeated Tarōmaru, confronts the other Scavenger members.
71	23	"Possession"; Transliteration: "Hyōi" (Japanese: 憑依)	Makoto Sokuza, Kazuki Horiguchi & Tetsuro Tanaka	Shōgo Yasukawa	Kouichi Takada, Tōru Yoshida & Tatsuyuki Nagai	September 11, 2020
Wanting to avoid a fight, Scavenger leader Rita Īzumi somehow manages to convince Mikoto that she's a member of Judgment sent to recover Doppelganger. While Mikoto pursues Doppelganger, who's targeting an airship filled with secret information, Rita guides them towards the facility the Scavengers were supposed to deliver Doppelganger to so they can sign off their job and escape. Facing off against Mikoto, Doppelganger continues to absorb more matter to grow to an enormous size.
72	24	"Diffusion"; Transliteration: "Kakusan" (Japanese: 拡散)	Tetsuro Tanaka, Akari Ranzaki, & Yoshihiro Mori	Shōgo Yasukawa	Takashi Iida & Tatsuyuki Nagai	September 18, 2020
Mikoto uses her ability to create her giant out of iron sand, using its properties to fire off a powerful electrical that can cut through Doppelganger's body. Doppelganger responds by forcing Mikoto to shoot down fuel tanks to protect civilians, exposing the airship in the process. As Ryōko tries to reason with Doppelganger to let her find a way to eliminate her soul, she attempts to jump to her death but is saved by the Scavengers. Learning from Misaki and Rita that Doppelganger's ability is a form of artificial muscle, which Doppelganger intends to use to set off a citywide explosion, Mikoto confronts her aboard the airship with Rita's assistance.
73	25	"My Dear Friends"; Transliteration: "Watashi no, Taisetsu na Tomodachi" (Japanese: 私の、大切な友達)	Tatsuyuki Nagai	Shōgo Yasukawa	Tatsuyuki Nagai	September 25, 2020
Learning that Doppelganger's objective was to end her life and destroy the data that could rebuild her, Mikoto respects her wishes and destroys the airship. Before Mikoto can finish off Doppelganger, one of the scientists' attempts to take Ryōko hostage to stop her, accidentally shooting her in the process. In her final moments, Doppelganger asks Mikoto to use what's left of her cyborg body to save Ryōko. Later, the Scavengers increase their rank in exchange for not getting paid for their mission while Mitsuko is formally introduced to Misaka 10032. Meanwhile, Doppelganger appears in Ryōko's dream, suggesting that she now coexists inside her body.

== Cast and characters ==
=== Main ===
- Rina Satō as Mikoto Misaka
- Satomi Arai as Kuroko Shirai
- Aki Toyosaki as Kazari Uiharu
- Kanae Itō as Ruiko Saten
- Azumi Asakura as Misaki Shokuhō

=== Recurring ===
- Kengo Kawanishi as Gunha Sogīta
- Minako Kotobuki as Mitsuko Kongō
- Haruka Tomatsu as Kinuho Wannai
- Yoshino Nanjō as Ma'aya Awatsuki
- Minami Tsuda as Junko Hokaze
- Nozomi Sasaki as the Sisters
- Maaya Uchida as Frenda Seivelun
- Kazuyoshi Hayashi as Keitz Nokleben
- Kana Ueda as Mī Konori
- Emi Shinohara as Misuzu Misaka
- Hitomi Ōwada as Xochitl
- Daichi Hayashi as Yoshio Baba
- Miyu Tomita as Mitori Kōzaku
- Atsushi Abe as Toma Kamijo
- Hazuki Ogino as Satori Kobayashi
- Binbin Takaoka as Gensei Kihara
- Konomi Kohara as Dolly
- Atsumi Tanezaki as Ryōko Kuriba / Doppelganger
- Akane Fujita as Rita Īzumi / Leader
- Aoi Koga as Naruha Sakuragi
- Yuka Nukui as Tarōmaru Seike
- Nozomi Nishida as Itsuki Yakumaru

== Production ==
=== Development and writing ===
During the Dengeki Bunko 25th Anniversary Fall Dengeki Festival event in October 2018, an untitled third season of A Certain Scientific Railgun television series was announced, with Tatsuyuki Nagai confirming his return to direct at J.C.Staff. Kazuma Kamachi, the creator of A Certain Magical Index series, and light novel editor Kazuma Miki revealed in November 2018 that the series was slated to be released in 2019 along with A Certain Scientific Accelerator television series, but it was delayed to January 2020.

In September 2019, staff members from the previous season were confirmed to be returning for the series, including character animation designer Yuichi Tanaka, art director Kentaro Izumi, and cinematographer Shingo Fukuyo, with Shogo Yasukawa handling the series composition. The title of the series was revealed in the same month to be A Certain Scientific Railgun T. The series' premiere date was revealed in November 2019 to be on January 10, 2020, and it would consist of twenty-five episodes. The Daihasei Festival story arc from A Certain Scientific Railgun manga series were adapted into the first half of the series, while the sixteenth episode onwards were based on the Dream Ranker arc.

=== Casting ===
With the announcement of a third season in October 2018, Rina Satō, Satomi Arai, Aki Toyosaki, Kanae Itō, and Azumi Asakura were also confirmed to reprise their respective roles as Mikoto Misaka, Kuroko Shirai, Kazari Uiharu, Ruiko Saten, and Misaki Shokuhō. Additional cast were confirmed in December 2019, including Kengo Kawanishi as Gunha Sogīta and Miyu Tomita as Mitori Kōzaku. In February 2020, Konomi Kohara joined the cast as Dolly, as did Atsumi Tanezaki in April as Ryōko Kuriba / Doppelganger.

=== Music ===
Maiko Iuchi returned to compose A Certain Scientific Railgun T. From episodes 1 to 15, the opening theme music is "Final Phase" by fripSide, while the ending theme music is "Nameless Story" by Kishida Kyoudan & The Akeboshi Rockets. From episode 16 onwards, the opening theme music is "Dual Existence" by fripSide, while the ending theme music is "Aoarashi no Ato de" (青嵐のあとで) by sajou no hana.

== Marketing ==
A full promotional video for A Certain Scientific Railgun T was released in December 2019. The series had the Daihaseisai guidebook and Mikoto Style booklet, which were given for free at the 97th Comiket. EJ Anime Hotel in Tokorozawa used the series as a theme in one of its rooms, which was opened by October 2020. Promotional partners for the series included Atré and Animate stores in Akihabara.

== Release ==
=== Broadcast ===
A Certain Scientific Railgun T began airing in Japan on AT-X, Tokyo MX, BS11, and MBS on January 10, 2020.

=== Home media ===
A Certain Scientific Railgun T was simulcast on the Japanese streaming website AbemaTV. The season was also streamed on Crunchyroll and Funimation. Hulu released it in Japan on March 24, 2022.

NBCUniversal Entertainment Japan released the first Blu-ray and DVD volumes on April 30, 2020, and the eighth and final volumes on December 25. They contain a bonus novel written by Kamachi titled A Certain Magical Index SS: Agnese's Magic Side Work Experience, while the first and fifth volumes contain the fifth and sixth episodes of the original video animation Much More Railgun (もっとまるっと超電磁砲, Motto Marutto Rērugan). A bonus two-track drama CD could be received when all eight volumes were purchased on Amazon Japan website. Funimation released the first volume set in North America on March 2, 2021, while the second volume set was released on June 29. Crunchyroll released the season on Blu-ray in North America on April 8, 2025, and in the United Kingdom on May 5.
