= Okami-san and Her Seven Companions =

Japanese light novel series

- Okami-san
- Cover of Okami-san light novel first volume featuring Ryoko Okami (left) and Ringo Akai (right)

オオカミさん
- Genre: Action, romantic comedy
- Light novel
- Written by: Masashi Okita
- Illustrated by: Unaji
- Published by: ASCII Media Works
- Imprint: Dengeki Bunko
- Original run: August 10, 2006 – April 8, 2017
- Volumes: 13
- Manga
- Written by: Masashi Okita
- Illustrated by: Kurumi Suzushiro
- Published by: ASCII Media Works
- Magazine: Dengeki Daioh
- Original run: April 2010 – October 2012
- Volumes: 4
- Anime television series

Okami-san & her Seven Companions
- Directed by: Yoshiaki Iwasaki
- Produced by: Nobuhiro Osawa; Tatsuhiro Nitta; Hatsu Takabayashi
- Written by: Michiko Itō
- Music by: Megumi Ōhashi
- Studio: J.C.Staff
- Licensed by: AUS: Madman Entertainment; NA: Funimation Entertainment; UK: Manga Entertainment
- Original network: AT-X, CTC, tvk, TV Saitama, Tokyo MX, TV Aichi, Sun TV
- English network: US: Funimation Channel
- Original run: July 1, 2010 – September 16, 2010
- Episodes: 12

The Okami-san (Japanese: オオカミさん) series is a collection of Japanese light novels by Masashi Okita, with illustrations by Unaji. The series started with the release of the first volume in August 2006, titled Okami-san & her Seven Companions (オオカミさんと七人の仲間たち, Ōkami-san to Shichinin no Nakama-tachi), and the 13th and last volume was released in April 2017. The series was published by ASCII Media Works under their Dengeki Bunko imprint. A manga adaptation by Kurumi Suzushiro was serialised from April 2010 to October 2012 issues of ASCII Media Works' shōnen manga magazine Dengeki Daioh and collected in four volumes. A 12-episode anime adaptation by J.C.Staff aired in Japan on AT-X between July 1 and September 16, 2010, and has been licensed and dubbed into English by Funimation Entertainment to be aired on American network television and released to DVD. The English-dubbed version of the anime adaptation was subsequently licensed and distributed by Madman Entertainment and Manga Entertainment to Australia and the United Kingdom, respectively.

== Plot ==
Set in the fictional Otogibana City, Okami-san & her Seven Companions follows the lives of Ryoko Okami (the eponymous Okami-san) and her friends, or companions, throughout their service as members of a "trading" club known as the Otogi High School Bank. At the start of the series, Ryoko and her partner, Ringo, are on a routine service assignment when an unseen stranger assists them. The following day, Ryoko encounters a boy in her class named Ryōshi Morino, a secret admirer of hers, on her way home from school. After being confronted by Ryoko, Ryōshi confesses his love for her and that he had been following her, a confession that is immediately turned down by Ryoko on the basis that he is weak. However, Ryōshi vows that he will become strong enough to be worthy to stand by her side. Later on in the series and with the help of the bank, Ryoko and Ringo discover that Ryōshi was the person who helped them on their service assignment and Ryōshi aids the pair in a fight on another service assignment, thereby prompting Ryoko to accept Ryōshi as someone who she can trust to watch her back. The series progresses in this manner as Ryoko develops romantic feelings for Ryōshi, while also parodying fairy tales such as "Little Red Riding Hood", "The Ant and the Grasshopper", "The Tortoise and the Hare", "Cinderella", "Hansel and Gretel", "The Little Match Girl", and so on.

== Characters ==
=== Otogi Bank ===
The main characters are part of a high school club called the Otogi Bank. The bank is an organization which sends its members to solve issues from various students seeking help, who then incur debts that they must repay with favors at the Otogi Bank's discretion. Ryoko is a member of the club, and her seven companions are the other members of the club at the start of the series (Ryoshi joins the club in the first episode but is not one of Ryoko's seven companions).

Ryoko Okami (大神 涼子, Ōkami Ryōko)
Voiced by: Shizuka Itō (Japanese); Brina Palencia (English)
A tomboyish high school girl who is fierce like a wolf and fights thugs using special Neko Neko Knuckles developed by one of the members of the Otogi Bank, Majolica le Fay. In everyday life, she maintains a strong, dismissive facade to disguise her true self: a kind person that is quite fearful of particular things. Although generally hostile towards Ryōshi due to his cowardice, she accepts him as someone who can watch her back in fights soon after they first fight together. As the series progresses, she develops romantic feelings for Ryōshi, going as far as to dream about him, but continues to treat him roughly. Because of this, Ryoko's character fits into the tsundere category of anime idioms. In addition, she is a close friend of Ringo Akai, whom she met shortly after leaving her junior high and was the first person that she befriended in Otogibana City. When her boyfriend Shirō attempted to rape her, he tricked everyone she knew into thinking that she was the one responsible for it. Unable to convince them of the truth, she left her junior high. Ryoko is based on the wolf from the various fairy tales, such as "Little Red Riding Hood", though on several occasions she is shown to be very different from her base character.

Ryoshi Morino (森野 亮士, Morino Ryōshi; also Ryoshi)
Voiced by: Miyu Irino (Japanese); Joel McDonald (English)
A shy boy who cowers when confronted by other people and so keeps his distance. It is explained in the anime that he suffers from ophthalmophobia, a fear of people staring at him. He has a crush on Ryoko and following a failed confession to her, he is somehow enrolled into Otogi Bank, where the others hope to use his low noticeability to avoid being detected. However, Ryōshi is much braver when hidden in darkness, and fights from afar using a wrist-mounted slingshot armed with pachinko balls with extreme precision, as shown when he knocks a baseball flying in midair about to hit Otsū. He is also known to perform well in fist fights if Ryoko is in danger. He is based on the hunter in the fairytale "Little Red Riding Hood" who captures the wolf or Okami-san.

Ringo Akai (赤井 林檎, Akai Ringo)
Voiced by: Kanae Itō (Japanese); Monica Rial (English)
A petite red-haired girl who has been longtime friends with Ryoko. She is the one who recruits Ryōshi into Otogi Bank. She is a close friend of Ryoko Okami, and is always trying to involve herself with her best friend's love life. Like Ryoko, she tends to smile to hide her true feelings, and admires Ryoko for trying to become stronger. She is based on the Little Red Riding Hood from the folktale of the same name, though some aspects of her scheming, manipulative personality closer resemble the poisoned apple ("Ringo" means apple) of Snow White, a fact which is occasionally referenced by the narrator and other characters. She is also the half sister of "Snow White" Shirayuki Himeno and feels responsible for her past. However, thanks to Ryoko, she moves on from the past. Aiden Foote of THEM Anime Reviews describes her as the "most conniving of all Lolitas and frequently referred to as evil by the dry voiced and witted narrator."

Liszt Kiriki (桐木 リスト, Kiriki Risuto; also Liszt)
Voiced by: Hirofumi Nojima (Japanese); Micah Solusod (English)
Liszt is the president of Otogi Bank; he is described as clever and laid-back, but resourceful. He sometimes disguises himself and cross-dresses in order to gather information. He is based on the grasshopper in "The Ant and the Grasshopper".

Alice Kiriki (桐木 アリス, Kiriki Arisu)
Voiced by: Yui Horie (Japanese); Terri Doty (English)
Liszt's cousin and secretary in the club. Does most club paperwork, and is based on the ant in "The Ant and the Grasshopper".

Otsu Tsurugaya (鶴ヶ谷 おつう, Tsurugaya Otsū)
Voiced by: Ayako Kawasumi (Japanese); Colleen Clinkenbeard (English)
The club's maid who has an obsession for returning favors. When she was young, she was saved from a car accident by a boy who died before she could thank him, resulting in her having a fear of not being able to return a favor. She is based on the crane from the Japanese tale Tsuru no Ongaeshi.

Taro Urashima (浦島 太郎, Urashima Tarō)
Voiced by: Shintaro Asanuma (Japanese); Todd Haberkorn (English)
A first-year transfer student who is a year older than the rest of the gang. He acts as a playboy and sometimes flirts with girls although he has a girlfriend, Otohime. He is based on the title character from the Japanese tale Urashima Tarō. It is heavily implied that he is in an intimate relationship with Otohime, and he occasionally enters a "gentleman mode".

Otohime Ryugu (竜宮 乙姫, Ryūgū Otohime)
Voiced by: Aki Toyosaki (Japanese); Caitlin Glass (English)
A girl with an obsessive crush on Tarō, who cares for her greatly but on some occasions is scared of her. It was thanks to Tarō's motivation that she changed from a chubby bullied elementary student to a thin beauty. Although Tarō often runs from her advances, he does have special feelings for her, and can even be considered her boyfriend. She is based on Princess Otohime from the Japanese tale Urashima Tarō. The reason she is called turtle is because Otohime from the legend was a turtle on land when she met Tarō. Her relationship with Mimi Usami is related to the fable, The Tortoise and the Hare.

Majolica le Fay (マジョーリカ・ル・フェイ, Majōrika Ru Fei; also Majolica)
Voiced by: Kimiko Koyama (Japanese); Lindsay Seidel (English)
Called Majo for short, she is a self-proclaimed mad scientist who builds various devices such as Ryoko's Neko Neko Knuckles. She is based on the sorceress Morgan le Fay. She takes the role of a fairy godmother at times.

=== Secondary characters ===
Momoko Kibitsu (吉備津 桃子, Kibitsu Momoko)
Voiced by: Yūko Kaida (Japanese); Stephanie Young (English)
Nicknamed Momo-chan-senpai, she is disciplinary committee member of Otogi High School. She is bisexual and will sometimes make suggestive passes at Ryoko, while using her 'dumplings' to get assistance from naive boys. She is based on the titular character from the Japanese tale Momotarō, and is often accompanied by a trio of students whose names and appearances are based on the Monkey, Dog and Pheasant that accompany Momotaro on his journeys.

Yukime Murano (村野 雪女, Murano Yukime)
Voiced by: Hitomi Nabatame (Japanese); Lydia Mackay (English)
She is Ryōshi's aunt. She is a novelist who writes romance stories, using her pen name "Yuki" and just happens to be Ryoko's favorite, and landlady of apartment "Okashisou" where Ryoshi lives. She is based on Japanese tale Yuki-onna.

Mimi Usami (宇佐見 美々, Usami Mimi)
Voiced by: Rie Kugimiya (Japanese); Jad Saxton (English)
She is based on the hare from the Aesop's fable "The Tortoise and the Hare". She is Tarō's and Otohime's childhood friend, and since very little she has held hostility towards Otohime, calling her with the mocking nickname of "turtle".

Ami Jizo (地蔵 亜美, Jizō Ami)
Voiced by: Mikako Takahashi (Japanese); Tia Ballard (English)
A second year student that requested aide from the Otogi Bank in episode 7, where she went on a double date with Okami and Ryoshi. Afterwards, she occasionally makes appearances. She is based on the Jizō from the Japanese tale Kasajizō.

Ranpu Aragami (荒神 洋燈, Aragami Ranpu)
Voiced by: Atsushi Ono (Japanese); R Bruce Elliott (English)
The principal of Otogi High School, who often requests certain 'services' from the bank in exchange for a lot of the club's more expensive items. He is based on the Genie of the Lamp from Aladdin.

Shirō Hitsujikai (羊飼 士狼, Hitsujikai Shirō)
Voiced by: Junichi Suwabe (Japanese); Ian Sinclair (English)
The main antagonist of the series. He is the student council president of Onigashima High School, a school of delinquents intended to conflict with Otogi High School. During middle school, he attempted to rape Ryoko but after that he spread bad rumors about Ryoko. He is based partially on The Boy Who Cried Wolf. However, like other characters, he's drawn from multiple sources; in this case, he is also based on the wolf in sheep's clothing figure. It may be noted that the kanji 狼(Rō) translates as wolf.

Himeno Shirayuki (白雪 姫乃, Shirayuki Himeno)
Voiced by: Yukari Fukui (Japanese); Kara Edwards (English)
She is the half-sister of Ringo. She is based on Snow White. (Shiro means white, Yuki means snow.) Himeno is often seen providing for her seven younger siblings (presumably septuplets) who are based on the Seven Dwarves from the same story.

Saburo Nekomiya (猫宮 三郎, Nekomiya Saburō)
Voiced by: Yūki Kaji (Japanese); Jerry Jewell (English)
A third-year student at Otogi described by the narrator as a "pretty boy." Knowledgeable about Ryōshi and the Otogi Bank, he takes it upon himself to "train" Ryōshi, even taking part in joining Ryōshi and company to Onigashima High School to save Okami because when he was younger, he was saved by Okami from a bunch of delinquents. His hair is shaped into cat ears, and his name, attitude and mannerisms are catlike. He is apparently a skilled fighter who easily overcomes Ryōshi. He is based on Puss in Boots. He is first shown in episode 6 where Ryoko saved him from the delinquents in a flashback. Neko means cat in Japanese.

Machiko Himura (火村 真知子, Himura Machiko)
Voiced by: Satomi Satō (Japanese); Cherami Leigh (English)
She is Ryoko, Ringo, and Ryōshi's classmate. She is based on The Little Match Girl. "Machi" in her name, Machiko, sounds like the word match. She appears in the last episode of the anime, attempting to win over Ryoshi. She and her father had been in serious debt, so she had been working towards paying off their debt. Her reason was so she could marry into his family, as she believed he was rather wealthy after seeing him outside his aunt's boarding complex with his "expensive" dogs. Later, when Ryoshi protects her from a group of debt collectors, she begins to really develop a crush on him. She becomes the newest resident of the boarding complex where Ryoshi lives and was able to let go of him after hearing just how much Ryoko meant to him.

Narrator
Voiced by: Satomi Arai (Japanese); Luci Christian (English)
In the anime, the narrator tells the tale and regularly makes sarcastic and offensive remarks about the characters at which main characters often break the fourth wall to glare at her.

== Media ==
=== Light novel ===
No.	Release date	ISBN
01	August 10, 2006	4-8402-3524-4
02	December 10, 2006	4-8402-3643-7
03	April 10, 2007	978-4-8402-3806-9
04	October 10, 2007	978-4-8402-4024-6
05	February 10, 2008	978-4-8402-4160-1
06	July 10, 2008	978-4-04-867134-7
07	January 10, 2009	978-4-04-867464-5
08	May 10, 2009	978-4-04-867822-3
09	September 10, 2009	978-4-04-868015-8
10	January 10, 2010	978-4-04-868279-4
11	July 10, 2010	978-4-04-868645-7
12	January 10, 2011	978-4-04-870130-3
13	April 8, 2017	978-4-04-869268-7

=== Manga ===
A manga adaptation, illustrated by Kurumi Suzushiro and titled Okami-san & her Seven Companions (オオカミさんと七人の仲間たち, Okami-san to Shichinin no Nakamatachi), was serialized between the April 2010 and October 2012 issues of ASCII Media Works' Dengeki Daioh. The first tankōbon volume was released on September 27, 2010, the fourth volume was released on November 27, 2012.

No.	Release date	ISBN
1	September 27, 2010	978-4-04-868914-4
2	May 27, 2011	978-4-04-870532-5
3	January 27, 2012	978-4-04-886281-3
4	November 27, 2012	978-4-04-891192-4

=== Anime ===
The anime series by J.C.Staff, titled Okami-san & her Seven Companions (オオカミさんと七人の仲間たち, Okami-san to Shichinin no Nakamatachi), aired from July 2, 2010, to September 17, 2010. The opening theme is "Ready Go!" by May'n while the ending theme is "Akazukin-chan Goyoujin" (赤頭巾ちゃん御用心, Careful Akazukin-chan) by OToGi8. At Otakon 2010, North American anime distributor Funimation Entertainment announced that they had acquired the right to the anime and streamed the series on their video portal before releasing the series on home video on April 3, 2012. The series made its North American television debut on September 10, 2012, on the Funimation Channel.

==== Episode list ====
No.	Title	Original release date
1	"Okami-san and Her Otogi Bank Companions" "Okami-san to Otogi Ginkō no Nakama-tachi" (おおかみさんと御伽銀行の仲間たち)	July 2, 2010
After beating someone wielding a knife with the aid of a mysterious savior, Ryōko Okami is confessed to by a shy Ryōshi Morino, and subsequently turns him down. When her friend Ringo Akai does a background check on him, she decides to recruit him into the Otogi Bank, a business that fulfills various requests for students in return for some favors. A client, Kakari Haibara arrives and requests for them to keep her senpai, Akihiro Ōji, from quitting the tennis club due to an injury. The Otogi Bank tries using Ryōshi's ability to remain unnoticed to stop Akihiro's resignation form from being approved, but with unsuccessful results. With only a matter of time before the form is handed in, Ryōshi rides Kakari to Akihiro in a pumpkin bicycle constructed by Majolica le Fay, though due to its lack of brakes, it crashes and Kakari ends up knocking him out, leaving her shoe behind in the retreat. Later that day, Ryōko and Ringo are confronted by the thug from earlier along with his buddies, and Ryōshi gets injured protecting her from a surprise attack. After defeating the thugs, Ryōko accepts Ryōshi as one of her companions. The next day, Akihiro, realizing by way of a Cinderella method that Kakari was the one who kicked him, promises her that they will play tennis together.
2	"Okami-san the Liar and Ryōshi-kun" "Usotsuki Okami-san to Ryōshi-kun" (うそつきおおかみさんと亮士くん)	July 9, 2010
Ryōshi tells Ringo about why he fell for Ryōko, which Ringo tells her about later that night. The next day while the other members go shopping, Ryōshi hangs around the Otogi Bank with Tarō Urashima, who quickly gets dragged away by Otohime Ryūgū when a female customer comes in, worried about having to see her violent ex-boyfriend. When Ryōko and Ryōshi investigate the meeting place, it turns out to be a trap laid out by thugs from Onigashima High School. Ryōko is overwhelmed and kidnapped while Ryōshi informs the other club members. Ryōko hides her true feelings of fear as she faces the gang's boss, who attempts to humiliate her by fondling her breasts. Ryōshi and Ringo use his dogs to discover the base, and Ryōshi uses a wrist mounted slingshot to attack the thugs from the shadows, helping to set Ryōko free to join the fight. When the boss tries to take Ryōko hostage, Ryōshi fights him one-on-one and manages to beat him while fueled by his feelings for her before passing out.
3	"Okami-san Gets Caught in the Fight between the Tortoise and the Hare" "Okami-san Usagi to Kame no Minikui Arasoi ni Makikomareru" (おおかみさんうさぎとかめの醜い争いに巻き込まれる)	July 16, 2010
Otohime is in a rivalry with Mimi Usami who used to call her names when she was a chubby elementary school student. They decide to enter the Otogi Academy pageant, being loosely based on the story of "The Tortoise and the Hare". Otohime requests the assistance of the Otogi Bank to help her win. Both sides end up using slander campaigns on their opponents, while Ryōko and the other girls somehow get entered as well. Otohime reminisces of how she first became Mimi's rival as well as Tarō's friend. During the pageant, all the females showcase their swimsuit attire, catching the eyes of the audience, though neither Otohime nor Mimi end up ranking. However Liszt Kiriki tells Otohime that she won the attention of Tarō as her only vote.
4	"Okami-san and Otsū-senpai's Favor Repayments" "Okami-san to Otsū-senpai no Ongaeshi" (おおかみさんとおつう先輩の恩返し)	July 23, 2010
When Ryōshi protects Otsū Tsurugaya from a stray baseball, she, being obsessed with repaying favors, becomes his maid and does all various things which makes him uncomfortable. While visiting Ryōshi's house to check on the situation, Ryōko and Ringo meet his aunt named Yukime Murano, an author whom Ryōko is a big fan of, who points out Ryōko's potential feelings for Ryōshi. Otsū soon gets a fever from overworking and collapses due to fatigue. The others learn about Otsū's childhood, where she was protected from a car by a boy who died before she could thank him, resulting in her having a fear of being unable to return favors. Ringo comes up with the idea of having everyone dress up as maids and serve Otsū, reminding her that there is no such thing as favors between friends.
5	"Okami-san Goes Oni-Hunting with Momo-chan-senpai" "Okami-san Momo-chan-senpai to Oni-taiji ni Yuku" (おおかみさん桃ちゃん先輩と鬼退治に行く)	July 30, 2010
Ryōko has trouble dealing with Momoko Kibitsu, a disciplinary committee member who is also a bisexual with a crush on her. Momoko comes to the Otogi Bank to request assistance for an attack on Onigashima High School. After getting through the initial waves of delinquents, the members are soon separated and communications are blocked off. Ryōko soon comes against Onigashima's student council president, Shirō Hitsujikai, who Ryōko fears greatly until Ryōshi and the others arrive to back her up, asking him to keep the delinquents in check. As the group wonders just what Shirō may be up to, Ryōko thanks Ryōshi for helping her.
6	"Okami-san and Akazukin-chan, and While We're at It, Ryōshi-kun" "Okami-san to Akazukin-chan, Tsuide ni Ryōshi-kun" (おおかみさんと赤ずきんちゃん、ついでに亮士くん)	August 6, 2010
Concerned about Ryōko, Ryōshi meets up with Ringo to ask about her relationship with Shirō, though she says it would be best to ask her himself once he gains her trust. Ringo recalls when she first met Ryōko in middle school and saw her true side for the first time. Noticing Ryōko pushing herself and getting into needless fights to hide her true feelings, Ringo came to understand her and offered her friendship. Ryōshi recalls when he started observing Ryōko and inevitably falling in love with her and decides to become stronger so he can protect her.
7	"Okami-san Goes on a Double Date with Jizō-san" "Okami-san Jizō-san to Daburu Dēto Suru" (おおかみさん地蔵さんとダブルデートする)	August 13, 2010
A girl named Ami Jizō has been secretly preparing food for baseball player Jin Hanasaki, as she has a crush on him, but is too shy to talk to him. Although he does not have feelings for her, he offers a date to repay her, with Ringo making it a double date with Ryōko and Ryōshi to ease her nerves. They go to the cinema, the arcade, the pet store, and the park. Halfway through the date, Ryōko spots a cat stuck up in a tree and, upon going to rescue it, falls into the pond and hits her head. She ends up contracting amnesia, believing she is thirteen years old, and has a completely different personality to her usual self. While Ryōshi looks after her in this state, Ami and Jin are left alone on their date. When Ryōshi and Ringo try to figure out how best to deal with it, Ryōko feels she is being ignored and runs off into the rain where she runs into Shirō. As Ryōshi catches up with her, he learns that Shirō assaulted her when she was younger and that she was unable to convince her classmates of the truth. In response, Ryōshi swears to hunt him down, however Shirō, before taking his leave, says that his story was just a lie. Ryōko later regains her memories, while Ami and Jin's date ended well enough.
8	"Okami-san and the Mouse Bride's Search, and This Is How Pigs Should Be Treated" "Okami-san to Nezumi no Yomesagashi to Yappari Buta wa Kō Iu Atsukai" (おおかみさんとねずみの嫁探しとやっぱり豚はこういう扱い)	August 20, 2010
The Otogi Bank receives a request to find Chūtarō Nezumi, the heir to a large company, a bride before his twelfth birthday. Alice Kiriki, along with Ami and Otohime, are listed as candidates, but are rejected by Hammel, his butler, for their personality flaws. After several other failed candidates, some of which are from A Certain Scientific Railgun and Toradora!, such as Mikoto Misaka, Hammel inadvertently insults Ryōko, Ringo, and Momoko. Later on, Hammel points Chūtarō in the direction of Uika, his childhood friend. The two get together, but Ryōko and the other girls are not happy about the pointless request, so Liszt buy them all expensive cakes in apology.
9	"Okami-san and Snow White, Who Is Immune to Poison Apples" "Okami-san to Doku-Ringo ga Kikanai Shirayuki-Hime" (おおかみさんと毒りんごが効かない白雪姫)	August 27, 2010
Ringo is having trouble confronting her friend Himeno Shirayuki, who looks after seven siblings. When Ryōshi inquires into the matter, Ringo explains that three years earlier, shortly after she first became friends with Himeno, she discovered that they were half-sisters. Himeno's mother and their father had just finalized their divorce and Ringo and her mother moved into the house, displacing Himeno and her mother. Feeling as though she had forced Himeno out of her home, Ringo was unable to bring herself to talk to her since. The following day, the Otogi Bank, along with Himeno and her siblings, go to a swimming pool and Ringo watches from afar. When Himeno almost drowns after rescuing one of her siblings, Ringo saves her using CPR, and the two finally have their long awaited reunion. The next day, Ringo convinces the school director, Ranpu Aragami, to give Himeno a special scholarship to university.
10	"Okami-san and the Otogi Bank's Really Long Day" "Okami-san to Otogi Ginkō no Sugoku Nagai Ichinichi" (おおかみさんと御伽銀行のすごく長い一日)	September 3, 2010
The Otogi Bank learned that someone has leaked information about their secret underground base to the press, believing it may be the work of Shirō. They decide to hold a discount on requests which makes everyone very busy. Ryōko, who had a strange dream involving Ryōshi, starts avoiding him. Later, Ryōshi encounters a catlike boy named Saburō Nekomiya, who offers to train Ryōshi to be a real man. Meanwhile, Ryōko and Ringo find a beaten up Onigashima high school student named Reiko Kokono injured outside their dorms. She explains that she was a girlfriend of Shirō who was cast aside and left at the hands of the delinquents. Ryōko allows Reiko to stay with her while arranging for her transfer to Otogi Academy. While Ryōshi trains with Saburō, Ringo asks Liszt to look into Reiko's background while Otsū keeps watch over her. However, Reiko turns out to be working for Shirō and this is part of a plan. Otsū, Ryōko and Otohime are kidnapped throwing the Otogi Bank into disarray.
11	"Okami-san and the Wolf in Sheep's Clothing" "Okami-san to Hitsuji no Kegawa o Kita Okami" (おおかみさんと羊の毛皮を着た狼)	September 10, 2010
Ryōshi continues his training with Saburō. A call from the president interrupts the lesson and he learns of Ryōko's kidnapping. Ryōko wakes up in Onigashima High School where she is confronted by Shirō. Elsewhere, Tarō rescues Otohime, Majolica rescues Otsū, and Liszt saves Alice and Mimi. Ryōshi and Saburō break through Onigashima's defenses with the help of Momoko and her subordinates along with the reunited members of the Otogi Bank. Sabōru finally explains that he decided to train Ryōshi because he once abandoned Ryōko when she was in danger and felt guilty. Soon after, Ryōshi faces Shirō and, while initially overwhelmed by his fighting ability, remembers his training and feelings and lands a hit on Shirō before Liszt arrives and declares the fight over. After Ryōko thanks everyone, they return to their daily routines.
12	"Okami-san and the Girl Who Doesn't Sell Matches But is Misfortunate Anyway" "Okami-san to Matchi-Uri ja Nai kedo Fukō na Shōjo" (おおかみさんとマッチ売りじゃないけど不幸な少女)	September 17, 2010
A poor papergirl named Machiko Himura notices her classmate, Ryōshi, leaving his dorm to walk his dogs and mistakenly believes that the Onotnashi dorm is a single residence and that his family owns it, which technically it does since his aunt and uncle are the proprietors. Believing she can marry out of poverty, Machiko confronts Ryōshi in class the following day and asks him to marry her. Later, to further her plans, she requests a date with him through the Otogi Bank. Ringo manipulates Ryōko's feelings for Ryōshi and gets her to follow him on his date, hoping that she will be more honest about herself. The date progresses well when Machiko abruptly ends it. A confused Ryōshi leaves but returns in time to save Machiko from loan sharks. A grateful Machiko reveals her motives for the date and proposal, which is that she has been paying off the family debt with the money from her part-time job, but her father ran away with the latest payment. Ryōshi, angry, not at Machiko, but at the situation life has put her in, calls the Otogi Bank to arrange matters. The loan sharks reappear and Ryōshi takes them on with Ryōko joining the fight unexpectedly. After the debt collectors are arrested, the Otogi Bank pays off Machiko's debt and arranges for her to become a tenant at the Otohashi residence. That evening, at Machiko's housewarming party, Machiko wants to confess again but before she can, Ryōshi tells Machiko that he can be manly because of Ryōko, who happens to be eavesdropping. Machiko later bluntly asks Ryōko if she likes him and agrees to back off when, true to her nature, she says that she does not dislike him.
