= A Certain Scientific Railgun: Astral Buddy =

2017 spin-off manga series of A Certain Scientific Railgun

- Cover of the first volume featuring Kuroko Shirai (left), Junko Hokaze and Senya Yūri (center), and Misaki Shokuhō

とある科学の超電磁砲(レールガン) アストラル・バディ (Toaru Kagaku no Rērugan: Asutoraru Badi)
- Genre: Science fiction, supernatural
- Created by: Kazuma Kamachi; Yasuhito Nogi
- Manga
- Written by: Kazuma Kamachi
- Illustrated by: Yasuhito Nogi
- Published by: ASCII Media Works
- English publisher: NA: Seven Seas Entertainment
- Magazine: Dengeki Daioh
- Original run: April 27, 2017 – July 27, 2020
- Volumes: 4

A Certain Scientific Railgun: Astral Buddy (Japanese: とある科学の超電磁砲(レールガン) アストラル・バディ, Hepburn: Toaru Kagaku no Rērugan: Asutoraru Badi), (Note: The official title of the manga is A Certain Scientific Railgun Side Story: Astral Buddy (とある科学の超電磁砲(レールガン)外伝 アストラル・バディ, Toaru Kagaku no Rērugan Gaiden: Asutoraru Badi).) often shortened to Astral Buddy, is a Japanese manga series written by Kazuma Kamachi and illustrated by Yasuhito Nogi, which was serialized by ASCII Media Works through their monthly magazine Dengeki Daioh from April 2017 to July 2020. The manga is a spin-off of A Certain Scientific Railgun series, focusing on a Tokiwadai Middle School student named Junko Hokaze and her encounter with the "ghost" named Senya Yūri. Seven Seas Entertainment publishes the manga in English.

== Premise ==
Junko Hokaze, the second-in-command of Misaki Shokuhō's clique known for her lavender ringlet hair, is being stalked by a "ghost" girl and begins to investigate her presence. The event takes place in conjunction with the Dream Ranker story arc of A Certain Scientific Railgun series.

== Media ==
=== Manga ===
A spin-off of A Certain Scientific Railgun was announced in the May issue of Dengeki Daioh on March 27, 2017, which began serialization in its next issue on April 27. Kentarō Ogino, the manga editor, announced that the spin-off's first release coincided with the 10th anniversary of its parent manga. The manga is written by Kazuma Kamachi and illustrated by Yasuhito Nogi, with characters designed by Kiyotaka Haimura. Astral Buddy concluded upon the magazine's release of the September 2020 issue on July 27, 2020. The manga was collected into four tankōbon volumes. Seven Seas Entertainment announced the acquisition of the manga's license at Anime Expo 2018 in Los Angeles, California.

No.	Original release date	Original ISBN	English release date	English ISBN
1	November 27, 2017	978-4-0489-3434-3	February 19, 2019	978-1-642750-36-2
Chapter 1: Stay Away from My Onee-sama! (私のお姉様に近づくな！, Watashi no Onē-sama ni Chikazukuna!); Chapter 2: What in the World Exactly Are You? (あなたいったい何者ですか？, Anata Ittai Nanimono desu ka?); Chapter 3: As I Thought, the Queen Does Not Have the Bag with Her (やはり女王にはそのお鞄がありませんと, Yahari Jo'ō ni wa Sono O-kaban ga Arimasen to); Chapter 4: I Don't Know If I Should Carry Out My Duty (私でお役にたてるかわかりませんけど, Watashi de o-yaku ni Tateru ka Wakarimasen kedo); Chapter 5: If I Win, I'll Take This as a Present! (優勝したらこいつをプレゼントだ！, Yūshō Shitara Koitsu o Purezento da!); Bonus Chapter
Junko Hokaze and Kuroko Shirai work together to solve a case that involved people close to Junko being harassed by a "ghost" due to their relationship with her. After the incident, Junko finally meets the ghost girl who could not remember her past. She tries to run away from the ghost using her Rampage Dress ability but she is unable to lose sight of her and decides to help her instead. During a clique meeting, Misaki Shokuhō arrives without her sling bag that contained her remotes after it got stolen by a lemur but it is later returned with the help of clique members under Satori Kobayashi's command. Misaki discovers Junko is looking for information about a certain girl. With Kuroko's suggestion, Junko visits Kazari Uiharu to look for information about the drawing of the ghost girl she found. Ruiko Saten introduces Junko to the Indian Poker cards since it is related to urban legends the ghost girl is connected to. Meanwhile, Misaki instructs Keitz Nokleben to investigate the Indian Poker cards as she holds a peculiar card. During the powers development exam, Junko, Kuroko, and Iruka Yumiya compete to win a Gekota makeup pouch from their teacher. Afterward, Misaki confronts the student who controlled the lemur but she gets knocked down when she read her memory that contained a flash of light from Iruka. A bonus chapter takes place after the lemur incident. Junko and the ghost girl argue for the use of makeup but the former decides to try it on. Later night, the ghost girl possesses the sleeping Junko to dress her up and bring her to Misaki to be complimented.
2	September 27, 2018	978-4-0491-2050-9	July 23, 2019	978-1-642750-76-8
Chapter 6: Final Weapon (最後の武器, Saigo no Buki); Chapter 7: The Serious You is Unbeatable (本気の貴女は無敵なんです, Honki no Kijo wa Muteki nan desu); Chapter 8: Innermost Feelings (女王, Jo'ō); Chapter 9: Does Your Head Hurt? (あたま痛いのぉ?, Atama Itai no~o?); Chapter 10: Welcome to 'Ideal' ☆ (ようこそ『内部進化(アイデアル)』へ☆, Yōkoso 'Aidearu' e ☆); Chapter 11: This Time for Real (今度こそ本気で, Kondo koso Honki de); Chapter 12: Even Though I Had No Talent (私に才能はなかったけれど, Watashi ni Sainō wa Nakatta Keredo); Bonus Chapter: Private Lesson (個人レッスン, Kojin Ressun)
Komaki Makigami arrives to rescue Misaki and manages to restrain Iruka but she gets defeated by Arei Hōjō. Junko arrives in time and fights Arei until Iruka stops them and traps Junko. The two retreat along with an unconscious Misaki and place her under a dream using an Indian Poker card. In the dream, Misaki is confronted by a person who took her appearance for toying the minds of people despite the intention of helping them and distancing herself from happiness in hopes for a miracle that a certain someone could remember her to happen. The ghost girl manages to possess Misaki's body, freeing her from the dream, and contacts Junko for her location. Junko then heads to District 10, where she located the GPS of Misaki's cellphone. The ghost girl tries to move Misaki's body, attracting the attention of Iruka and Arei, and the body is placed under a dream again. The ghost girl witnesses a memory that contained the meeting between Iruka, her older sister Rakko Yumiya, and Ayu Mitsuari, who welcomed the sibling to the Ideal lab; Iruka's first time meeting Junko despite the latter's hostility and her aspiration to be like her when she witnessed her superhuman strength; and how Misaki helped Junko be relieved of her headache with her power. The ghost girl's way of viewing the events from the ceiling turns out to be her memories when she observed them during her time in the Ideal lab. Meanwhile, Junko arrives in an abandoned factory and fights Iruka. She manages to render her Wave Conductor ability useless, by raining down water from the roof's water storage tank, and deflect her flash of light attacks but Iruka's right eye releases tiny lasers around them. A bonus chapter shows Junko teaching Mikoto Misaka how to strengthen her body, causing Kuroko to become jealous.
3	July 26, 2019	978-4-0491-2643-3	July 14, 2020	978-1-642757-45-3
Chapter 13: The World Where That Person Is (あの人のいる世界, Ano Hito no Iru Sekai); Chapter 14: Everyone's 'Big Sister' (みんなの『お姉さん』, Min'na no 'Onē-san'); Chapter 15: The Meaning of Being Born in this World (この世に生まれた意味, Konoyo ni Umareta Imi); Chapter 16: Strong (強く, Tsuyoku); Chapter 17: So, At Least... (だから せめて, Dakara Semete); Chapter 18: Close Friends (親友, Shin'yū); Chapter 19: Astral Buddy (アストラル・バディ, Asutoraru Badi)
Junko strengthens her body to block the tiny lasers released by Iruka. Afterward, the two finally reconcile as they realize their powers are not strong enough. In the past, Ayu is told to choose among the candidates who would advance to the next experiment of becoming a Level 5 because of budget restraints. This causes a heavy burden for her since she is the oldest among them and witnesses their efforts to gain power. Iruka cheers up everyone by bringing them to the rooftop. Ayu decides to withdraw from the experiment. The ghost girl's past is revealed to be a patient named Senya Yūri with incurable lung disease, who befriended Junko and met Ayu for the first time. She becomes an integral part of the experiment in the Ideal lab, which would study the concept of mesmerism, due to her ability to separate her AIM diffusion field from her body. Senya's power turns unstable during the experiment and possesses a researcher. Ayu struggles to restrain him using her Mental Stinger ability and Rakko gets hurt when she protected her sister from him. As he is about to attack Iruka, who got her right eye wounded by him, Junko arrives in time to save her. Kanari Tōmine, a fellow researcher who took care of Senya, distracts him enough for Ayu to stop him but she gets killed in the process. After the incident, Nōkan Kihara visits the head of Ideal lab named Toshizō Shundō to warn him about his continuous use of subjects for his gruesome experiments. Misaki is in contact with a female member of the Board of Directors, who decided to stop funding the lab in exchange for Misaki to enroll at Tokiwadai Middle School. Back in the present, Senya saves Misaki and arrives in time to help Junko defeat Arei and save Iruka from being killed by poison that Arei injected. Gunha Sogīta shows up and saves the unconscious Junko from falling debris. Kuroko later visits Komaki in a hospital, while Misaki visits Junko and Iruka. Arei releases the footage of Junko's ability to the public. Gunha assumes Junko is the perpetrator behind Indian Poker cards and fights her. She struggles to counter his attacks when Senya regained her memories and assisted her using her Astral Buddy ability.
4	October 26, 2020	978-4-0491-3390-5	June 22, 2021	978-1-64505-468-9
Chapter 20: Rarity Ability (稀少力, Kishōryoku); Chapter 21: ...Somewhat Ticked Me Off (少しカチンときました, Sukoshi Kachin to Kimashita); Chapter 22: If I Had Been Stronger (力があればなんてのは, Chikara ga Areba Nante no wa); Chapter 23: If I Was A Level 5 (私が超能力者なら, Watashi ga Reberu 5 Nara); Chapter 24: Even I Have An Intelligent Side (わたくしだって頭脳派な一面が, Watakushi Datte Zunō-hana Ichimen ga); Chapter 25: Coupling (共有, Kappuringu); Chapter 26: How Can I Ever Beat These Geniuses (どうやって天才共に, Dōyatte Koitsura ni); Chapter 27: Rampage Dress (天衣装着(ランペイジドレス), Ranpeiji Doresu); Chapter 28: Because We... (だってわたくしたち, Datte Watakushi-tachi); Chapter 29: The Wind in My Sails (帆を押す風, Ho o Osu Kaze); Chapter 30: Selfish (わがまま, Wagamama); Omake
Misaki agrees to work with Kuroko in her investigation about Arei. Meanwhile, the battle between Junko and Gunha continues until Misaki arrives with Kuroko and puts him under mind control. Gunha manages to break out of her control and becomes friends with Junko as they acknowledge their incredible powers. Misaki consoles Junko when she blamed herself for not becoming strong enough to save others. A disturbance suddenly absorbs Senya in front of Junko and Misaki. Misaki uses her ability to relay the information she read from Gunha's memories to Junko, revealing Gunha's discovery of miasmas from people who used Indian Poker cards. Kazari contacts Junko to inform her about her search of the ghost girl's drawing and its connection to Indian Poker cards with Academy City's urban legends. It turns out Ayu is the mastermind behind the recent events and is working with Seigo Hōjō to continue the Ideal experiment. Misaki and Kuroko team up to neutralize people who were affected by the Indian Poker card. With Kazari's help, Junko and Iruka arrive in the former Ideal lab. On the other hand, Misaki and Kuroko are attacked by Arei but they manage to evade her attacks. Kuroko fights Arei until she manages to defeat her. Meanwhile, Junko and Iruka reunite with Seigo, who turned out to be the possessed researcher in the past. Gunha also arrives and fights him. Junko reaches the room where Senya's body rested and reunites with Senya's ghost form. Senya tells Junko once the device connected to her deactivates, her memories with her and Misaki will disappear but she will still regain consciousness with a different persona. Misaki arrives after she covered up the urban legend about Senya online with another rumor to stop Ayu's plan and works with the two to revive Senya's body. Meanwhile, Gunha defeats Seigo and meets Ayu. He brings them to a secluded area as per Seigo's request. Ayu witnesses his death and laments how the kindest people always suffered. The next day, Junko and Senya visit Kanari's grave. An extra chapter shows Komaki returning to work in Judgment and Iruka's wish to meet Arei soon after the latter escaped from the hospital.

== Reception ==
=== Sales ===
Astral Buddy ranked 49th on Oricon's top weekly manga between November 27 and December 3, 2017, with 16,711 estimated total copies of the first volume sold. The spin-off took 64th place on Amazon's weekly manga ranking dated October 26–November 1, 2020.

=== Critical response ===
Robert McCarthy of Otaku USA reviewed the first volume of Astral Buddy, lauding the plot of the manga but describing the panels and pages of it as a mess because some parts of them were hard to tell what it wanted to convey. He criticized the cluttered speed lines and the visual presentation of espers' powers. The continuous use of panty flashing and the "romance" between female characters led him to consider the manga as a fan service.
