= Toma Kamijo =

Fictional character from A Certain Magical Index

- A Certain Magical Index and A Certain Scientific Railgun character
- Toma Kamijo as he appears in the anime
- First appearance: A Certain Magical Index vol.1, prologue "The Tale of the Boy Who Could Kill Illusions – The_Imagine-Breaker." (序章 幻想殺しの少年のお話 The_Imagine-Breaker.)
- Created by: Kazuma Kamachi
- Voiced by: Atsushi Abe; (Japanese); Micah Solusod; (English)

In-universe information
- Full name: Toma Kamijo
- Nickname: Imagine Breaker
- Species: Human
- Gender: Male
- Occupation: Student
- Family: Toya Kamijo; (father); Shiina Kamijo; (mother); Otohime Tatsugami; (cousin)
- Nationality: Japanese

Toma Kamijo (Japanese: 上条 当麻, Hepburn: Kamijō Tōma) is a fictional character created by Kazuma Kamachi and first illustrated by Kiyotaka Haimura. He is the main protagonist of the light novel series A Certain Magical Index and a major character in its manga spin-off series A Certain Scientific Railgun.

A high school student living in Academy City, Toma possesses a rare ability in his right arm dubbed the Imagine Breaker which allows certain types of power to be nullified at the cost of his luck. Upon coming into contact with a mysterious nun named Index, Toma is caught in a crossfire between various factions of espers and sorcerers whose goals are deeply rooted on uncovering the City's secrets, and the duo.

The character has been praised by both fans and critics alike for his personality, role in the series' plot, and the way he uses the Imagine Breaker ability. He also consistently ranks high in popularity polls, and has been featured in several items and promotions.

== Creation and conception ==
According to Kamachi, Toma was created with Index at the concept stage, with the concept of "what type of hero can save [the girl]" and "how would a boy who mysteriously sees a girl who came from a completely different civilization called the magic side react". Since most readers of Dengeki Bunko were teenage boys, Kamachi made Toma a teenage boy in order to "get closer to the reader's point of view".

His ability, Imagine Breaker, was created with the concept that Kamachi wanted the power to be unique and able to "reverse any [other power] with a single shot if he releases it". He eventually decided on a power that could cancel out other powers, since it met those criteria and it "can't be effective unless it's used in a specific situation".

== Characteristics and appearances ==
Toma is a first-year high-school student. Despite the fact that he is a level zero (powerless), his right hand has an ability called Imagine Breaker (幻想殺し(イマジンブレイカー), Imajin Bureikā; "Illusion/Fantasy Killer"), which allows him to cancel out any other power by touching it. As a result of that power, he is very unlucky and is also occasionally referred to as "the Imagine Breaker". After freeing Index from the church's curse, he ends up losing all of his memories. His memory loss is kept a secret and known only to himself and a few others, including his doctor Heaven Canceller, Terra of the Left, Mikoto Misaka, Fiamma of the Right, Index, Seria Kumokawa, and Misaki Shokuhō. Toward the end of the third season of the anime (light novel volumes 14–22), Toma's right hand is cut off. A dragon head referred to as Dragon Strike (竜王の顎(ドラゴンストライク), Doragon Sutoraiku; "Jaw of the Dragon King") emerges briefly from the stump. After it dissipates, his hand grows back.

=== In A Certain Magical Index ===
In A Certain Magical Index, Toma is the main protagonist. The series mostly focuses on Toma's relationship with Index and Mikoto, as well as the magic side of the world. He is also the main protagonist of its movie spin-off A Certain Magical Index: The Movie – The Miracle of Endymion, as well as the series' other various spin-offs.

=== In A Certain Scientific Railgun ===
In A Certain Scientific Railgun, Mikoto is the main protagonist. Since that is the case, Toma's involvement in this series is usually just with Mikoto and the science side of the world. In the series, he helps her get out of trouble multiple times, even stopping her from committing suicide once. Mikoto develops tsundere-like feelings for Toma as a result, though he does not seem to reciprocate.

=== Other appearances ===
Toma appears in Kamachi's one-volume crossover series Toaru Majutsu no Heavy na Zashiki-warashi ga Kantan na Satsujinki no Konkatsu Jijou (とある魔術のへヴィーな座敷童が簡単な殺人妃の婚活事情; lit. A Certain Magical Heavy Zashiki-Warashi Deals With a Simple Killer Princess' Marriage Circumstances). He also appears as an assist character to Mikoto in the crossover video game Dengeki Bunko: Fighting Climax.

== Reception ==
=== Popularity ===
In a 2010 poll which asked subscribers to the Dengeki Online website "Which anime and game characters would you like to name your children after?" Toma ranked first on the list of male names. In another poll, this time surveying male otaku and asking them what male character they would like as their boyfriend, Toma ranked twenty-fourth. In another poll surveying Japanese Otaku, but instead asking them what is their favorite characters based on season of the year, Toma was one of the forty-seven chosen for summer. In a popularity poll for the series, he ranked fourth, with over 5,000 people voting for him. In a poll asking about best couple ship, him and Mikoto Misaka ranked third overall and second among male voters. Many fans of the series in Japan refer to him as "Kamijo-san magi paneesu", translating to "Kamijo-san is never half-assed", a statement akin to "the absolute madman".

Various pieces of merchandise have been made using Toma's likeness, such as action figures, keychains, and cosplay costumes. Merchandise depicting the character was also given out in a promotion with Lawson. His ability, Imagine Breaker, also inspired a menu item at NBCUniversal Entertainment Japan's anime cafe. The item was a drink with a hand in it.

=== Accolades and critical reception ===
Toma won the award for best male character in the 2011, 2017, and 2019 issues of Kono Light Novel ga Sugoi!. He has been featured in the top ten every year since 2007, getting second in 2012, 2013, 2014, and 2015, third in 2008, 2009, 2010, 2016, 2018, and 2020, seventh in 2021, and ninth in 2007.

Critics have given praise to Toma. Carl Kimlinger from Anime News Network praised the character, stating that the series is "a thrill on every relevant level: emotional, mental, and visceral" when Toma gets into action. Matthew Warner from The Fandom Post praised him, saying he was "fun to watch". Chris Beveridge from the same website also praised the character. Theron Martin from the same website as Kimlinger concurred, calling the character "energetic", though criticizing him for being a bit preachy at times.

Toma's involvement in the Scientific Railgun plot has also been praised. In her review of A Certain Scientific Railgun S, Rebecca Silverman called Toma's role a "highlight [of the series]". Andy Hanley from UK Anime Network also praised Toma's role in the series and his relationship with Mikoto, stating that "Mikoto's relationship with Toma [in the series] also works exceedingly well". Theron Martin from Anime News Network also praised Toma's involvement in the third season of the series, called A Certain Scientific Railgun T. Specifically, he called a moment involving him was one of the best scenes in the entire series.

Toma's ability Imagine Breaker has also been praised. Warner praised Toma's ability, calling it "unique". Chris Beveridge from the same website also praised Toma's ability, calling it "intriguing". Kim Morrissy from Anime News Network also praised Toma's ability, stating that it makes him a wild-card of the series and entertaining to watch.

Toma's portrayals have also been praised. Theron Martin from Anime News Network praised Toma and the rest of the dub performances, calling them "very solid". Chris Beveridge concurred, stating that it was "clear the cast members were having fun with their roles".
