= Atsushi Abe =

Japanese voice actor and narrator

- 阿部 敦
- Born: March 25, 1981 (age 45); Ashikaga, Tochigi, Japan
- Occupations: Voice actor; narrator
- Years active: 2006–present
- Agent: Ken Production

Atsushi Abe (阿部 敦, Abe Atsushi; born March 25, 1981) is a Japanese voice actor and narrator represented by Ken Production. Some of his major roles include Toma Kamijo in the A Certain Magical Index and A Certain Scientific Railgun series, Kukai Soma in Shugo Chara!, Moritaka Mashiro in Bakuman, Takashi Kosuda in B Gata H Kei, Koichi Sakakibara in Another, Touichirou Izumida in Yowamushi Pedal, and Kokonotsu Shikada in Dagashi Kashi.

Abe has used aliases for some of his work, especially when voicing adult games, visual novels, and drama CDs. He has also been credited as Jun Teradake (寺竹 順, Teradake Jun), Hakana Kannagi (神凪 儚, Kannagi Hakana), Magic (マジック, Majikku), Kaoru Nagihara (凪原 薫, Nagihara Kaoru), and Tatsumi Shirogane (銀 巽, Shirogane Tatsumi).

== Filmography ==
=== Anime ===
Year	Series	Role	Notes	Source
2005	Kotencotenco			
2006	Nana	Man		
2006	Coyote Ragtime Show	Alex		
2006	Kekkaishi	Classmate B, Boy A	Eps. 19, 38	
2007–09	Shugo Chara!	Kukai Soma	Also Doki and Party	
2008	Rosario + Vampire			
2008	Kimi ga Aruji de Shitsuji ga Ore de	Assassin	Ep. 7	
2008	Shigofumi: Letters from the Departed	Tooru Kotake	Eps. 3, 6, 12–13	
2008	Kyo kara Maoh! 3rd Series			
2008	Nabari no Ou	Kazemanin		
2008	Sands of Destruction	Karakuri soldier		
2008	Xam'd: Lost Memories	Akiyuki Takehara		
2008	Toradora!	Schoolboy, Boy	Eps. 8–7, 12, 17	
2008	Linebarrels of Iron	Student		
2008–10	A Certain Magical Index	Toma Kamijo	Best New Actor Award, 4th Seiyu Awards	
2008	Tytania	Various characters		
2009	Slap Up Party -Arad Senki-	Kadin		
2009	Guin Saga	Marius		
2009–13	A Certain Scientific Railgun	Toma Kamijo	Also Railgun S, OVA	
2010	Ookiku Furikabutte ~Natsu no Taikai-hen~	Atsushi Yano, Pitcher Kobayashi		
2010	Maid Sama!	Hinata Shintani		
2010	B Gata H Kei	Takashi Kosuda		
2010-11	Metal Fight Beyblade	Zeo Abyss		
2010–12	Bakuman	Moritaka Mashiro		
2010	Megane na Kanojo		OVA	
2010	Goulart Knights	Hokuto	OVA	
2011–2019	Cardfight!! Vanguard	Ren Suzugamori, Mark-sensei	Also Asia Circuit, Link Joker, Legion Mate, G GIRS Crisis, Stride Gate, and 2018 Series	
2011	Gosick	Ambrose		
2011	X-Men	Takeo Sasaki		
2011	Blood-C	Itsuki Tomofusa	Also The Last Dark film	
2011	Last Exile: Fam, The Silver Wing	Heine		
2012	Another	Kōichi Sakakibara		
2012	Hyouka	Tomohiro Haba		
2012	Aesthetica of a Rogue Hero	Motoharu Kaidou		
2012	My Little Monster	Masahiro Ayanokouji		
2012	Initial D: Fifth Stage	Shinji Inui		
2013–14	Yowamushi Pedal	Tōichirō Izumida	Also OVA	
2015	Gunslinger Stratos: The Animation	Tohru Kazasumi		
2015	Danchigai	Haruki Nakano		
2015	Boruto: Naruto the Movie	Inojin Yamanaka		
2016	Haikyū!! 2	Takeru Nakashima		
2016–18	Dagashi Kashi	Kokonotsu Shikada		
2016	Norn9	Sorata Suzuhara		
2017-23	Boruto: Naruto Next Generations	Inojin Yamanaka, White Zetsu (biological weapon)	Ep. 51	
2018	Fate/Extra Last Encore	Hakuno Kishinami		
2018–22	IDOLiSH7	Sōgo Ōsaka		
2018	Free! Dive to the Future	Romio Hayahune		
2018	Planet With	Sōya Kuroi		
2018–19	Hinomaru Sumo	Hinomaru Ushio		
2019–20	Beyblade Burst GT	Amane Kusaba		
2019	Kochoki: Wakaki Nobunaga	Nobutomo Oda		
2020–22	Princess Connect! Re:Dive	Yuuki		
2020	Magatsu Wahrheit -Zuerst-	Inumaeru		
2020	Yes, No, or Maybe?	Kei Kunieda		
2021	To Your Eternity	Shin		
2021	The Deer King		Film	
2022	Toku Touken Ranbu: Hanamaru ~Setsugetsuka~	Suishinshi Masahide	Film	
2023	Farming Life in Another World	Hiraku Machio		
2023	Chillin' in My 30s After Getting Fired from the Demon King's Army	Bashvaza		
2023	The Iceblade Sorcerer Shall Rule the World	Evan Bernstein		
2023	The Tale of the Outcasts	Watson		
2023	16bit Sensation: Another Layer	Mamoru Rokuda		
2024	Spice and Wolf: Merchant Meets the Wise Wolf	Evan		
2025	9-Nine: Ruler's Crown	Kakeru Niimi		
2025	The Banished Court Magician Aims to Become the Strongest	Regulus Caldana		
2026	My Ribdiculous Reincarnation	"I"		

=== Video games ===
Year	Series	Role	Notes	Source
2010	Last Escort: Club Katze	Sato	PS2 and PSP	
2010–13	Natsuzora no Monologue series	Ikki Kinose	PS2 and PSP versions	
2011	Star Fox 64 3D	ROB 64, Bill Grey, Andrew Oikonny	Japanese version	
2011	7th Dragon 2020	Unit 13		
2012–14	Initial D Arcade Stage series	Shinji Inui		
2013	Norn 9	Sorata Suzuhara		
2015	Haruka: Beyond the Stream of Time 6	Kohaku (age 17)		
2015	Xuccess Heaven	Students at Red Academy	Smartphone RPG	
2015	Stella Glow	Alto		
2015	Revenant Dogma	Caine		
2015	Tokyo Xanadu	Ryōta Ibuki	PS Vita, PS4, PC	
2016	Alchemist Code	Vettel	iOS, Android	
2018	Princess Connect! Re:Dive	Yuuki	iOS, Android	
2018	Food Fantasy	Cola, Eclair, Pancake	iOS, Android	
2019	Starlink: Battle for Atlas	Andrew Oikonny	Nintendo Switch	
2019	Arknights	Castle-3, Spot	iOS, Android	
2019	A Certain Magical Index: Imaginary Fest	Tōma Kamijō	iOS, Android	
2022	Digimon Survive	Minoru Hinata	PC, PS4, Xbox One, Nintendo Switch	
2024	Eiyuden Chronicle: Hundred Heroes	Pohl	PC, PS4, PS5, Nintendo Switch, Xbox One, Xbox Series X/S	
2024	Zenless Zone Zero	Wise	PC, PS5, iOS, Android	

=== Drama CDs ===
Year	Series	Role	Notes	Source
	Kanikosen	Kenichi Yamada		
	Poe-clan			
	Maid Sama!	Hinata Shintani		
	Kami-sama no Memo-chu	Narumi		
	A Certain Magical Index	Tōma Kamijō		
	A Certain Scientific Railgun	Tōma Kamijō		

=== Overseas dubbing ===
Series	Role	Notes	Source
Alone in Love	Lee Dong-jin	Dub voice for Kam Woo-sung	
Astro Boy	Zane	2009 feature film	
Beethoven Virus	Kang Gun-woo (trumpeter, young)		
Drake & Josh	Craig Ramirez	Dub voice for Alec Medlock	
ER	Vail???		
Euphoria	Christopher McKay	Dub voice for Algee Smith	
Even Stevens	Zack Estrada	Dub voice for Brandon Baker	
Full-Court Miracle	Alex Schlotsky		
Ghost Whisperer	Jason	2nd season	
The Girl Next Door	William "Willie" Chandler Jr.	2007 film, Dub voice for Graham Patrick Martin	
Hannah Montana	Max	Dub voice for Teo Olivares	
Harry Potter and the Half-Blood Prince	Boy 1		
Hot Shot	Dong Fang Xiang	Dub voice for Jerry Yan	
Kickin' It	Jack	Dub voice for Leo Howard	
Kim Su-ro, The Iron King	young Tal-hae	Dub voice for Shin Dong-ki	
Miss Granny	Ban Ji-ha	Dub voice for Jinyoung	
One Tree Hill	Russ???		
Queen Seondeok	young Bojong	Dub voice for Kwak Jung-wook	
Where the Wild Things Are	Friend 2		
Without a Trace	Alex		
