= A Certain Scientific Railgun season 2 =

2013 Japanese television season

A Certain Scientific Railgun S
- Season 2
- First home media volume cover, featuring Mikoto Misaka (L) and Kuroko Shirai (R)
- Starring: Rina Satō; Satomi Arai; Aki Toyosaki; Kanae Itō; Nozomi Sasaki; Atsushi Abe
- No. of episodes: 24

Release
- Original network: AT-X
- Original release: April 12 – September 27, 2013

Season chronology
- ← Previous; Season 1 Next → Season 3: T

The second season of the Japanese animated television series A Certain Scientific Railgun, marketed as A Certain Scientific Railgun S, is based on the manga series of the same name written by Kazuma Kamachi and illustrated by Motoi Fuyukawa. The season follows Mikoto Misaka in her attempt to stop the deadly project that involves her clones and the most powerful esper in Academy City named Accelerator, with unlikely help from Toma Kamijo. Produced by J.C.Staff, the season was directed by Tatsuyuki Nagai with series composition supervised by Seishi Minakami.

A Certain Scientific Railgun S sees the return of the main cast members Rina Satō, Satomi Arai, Aki Toyosaki, and Kanae Itō, with the addition of Nozomi Sasaki and Atsushi Abe from A Certain Magical Index television series.

The second season consists of 24 episodes and ran on AT-X from April 12 to September 27, 2013, with other networks following days later. A third season was announced in October 2018.

== Episodes ==
No. overall	No. in season	Title	Directed by	Written by	Storyboarded by	Original release date
25	1	"Railgun"; Transliteration: "Rērugan" (Japanese: 超電磁砲(レールガン))	Tatsuyuki Nagai	Seishi Minakami	Tatsuyuki Nagai	April 12, 2013
Following a run-in with Misaki Shokuhō, another Level 5 esper from Tokiwadai Middle School, Mikoto Misaka meets up with Kuroko Shirai, Kazari Uiharu, Ruiko Saten, and Erii Haruue as they visit Banri Edasaki in a hospital. While Erii rekindles with Banri, who is undergoing physiotherapy, Mikoto tries to come up with a way to surprise Banri with a present everyone bought for her, only to realize she had left the bag containing the present in Banri's ward. Meanwhile, a criminal patient that was under watch by Anti-Skill is broken free by his companions and takes Erii as a hostage. Upon learning of the situation from Aiho Yomikawa and Tsuzuri Tessō, Mikoto heads to the rooftop to try and prevent the culprits from escaping via helicopter. They throw Erii off the side of the building to break free, but she is saved thanks to Ruiko and Kuroko. Learning that her bag is onboard the fleeing helicopter, Mikoto has Kuroko teleport her to the skies and destroys the helicopter, with Kuroko safely apprehending the culprits. With the incident dealt with, Banri finally opens her present from everyone, which is a Sakugawa Middle School uniform for her to wear once she recovers.
26	2	"Critical"; Transliteration: "Kuritikaru" (Japanese: 寿命中断(クリティカル))	Daisuke Takashima	Seishi Minakami	Shigehito Takayanagi	April 19, 2013
Mikoto dreams of her younger self being approached by scientists wanting to use her DNA map to help cure patients with muscular dystrophy. The next morning, Kuroko tries to take Mikoto through an alleyway to get to the mall, and they encounter a few people passing by. They learn about envelopes containing cash cards being placed in the alleyways, piquing people's curiosity to search for them. After running into Ruiko, who is also on the hunt for the cards, Mikoto overhears some Skill-Out members who have managed to locate the source of the envelopes and follows them. Ruiko grows curious as she had allegedly seen Mikoto at the mall, while Mii Konori explains to Kazari about a rumor about clones of a Level 5 esper. The Skill-Out members eventually trace the envelopes to a female student of Nagatenjōki Academy and demand she hand over them. Things get tense, however, when it appears the Skill-Out members are gradually getting killed off by her, who claims to be able to freely kill anyone she has touched. When Mikoto arrives on the scene, the girl, who had simply knocked out all the Skill-Out members using anesthetic and clever acting skills, recognizes her as the "original".
27	3	"Project Radio Noise"; Transliteration: "Redio Noizu Keikaku" (Japanese: 超電磁砲量産計画(レディオノイズけいかく))	Masahiro Sonoda	Seishi Minakami	Yūichi Nihei	April 26, 2013
Mikoto is reminded of rumors about having a clone and attempts to question the girl, who was responsible for distributing the envelopes to fill the alleyways that security cameras cannot reach with human eyes. However, the girl leaves after inadvertently setting the building on fire whilst burning the evidence, simply stating Mikoto is better off not knowing as she would be unable to stop what was happening with her power. After saving the Skill-Out members, Mikoto looks up for information on the girl, whose name is revealed to be Shinobu Nunotaba, who worked at the same medical facility where she had given the scientists her DNA map years ago. Mikoto infiltrates the facility and comes across a hidden room. Mikoto hacks into the database and is shocked to learn that the scientists tricked her into giving them her DNA map to create clones called "Sisters" under Project Radio Noise. However, the project was canceled when the Tree Diagram supercomputer deduced that the clones would not come close to matching Mikoto's level of power. Believing there were not any clones of her after all, Mikoto feels relieved and leaves the facility, unaware of a clone arriving later to delete the database.
28	4	"Sisters"; Transliteration: "Shisutāzu" (Japanese: 妹達(シスターズ))	Katsushi Sakurabi	Kurasumi Sunayama	Yasuo Muroi	May 3, 2013
Three months earlier, in an unknown facility, a pair of women scientists named Yumi Kusakabe and Eiga Kanmi had mentored the birth of a clone of Mikoto, labeled Misaka 9982, and installed her memory functions via a capsule-like machine called Testament. Back in the present, Mikoto, who is feeling cheerful with the clone rumors being seemingly debunked, goes shopping with Kuroko and the others at the mall and helps Kazari and Erii buy a rice cooker whilst also picking out things for an upcoming school trip. The next day, as Mikoto ends up having nothing to do, some young children, including the girl whose bag she previously found, pick up on her boredom and have her play with them. Noticing one of the kids wearing a Gekota badge, Mikoto frantically goes through a whole bunch of capsule vendors to win one for herself. As the day comes to an end, Mikoto suddenly senses a power identical to her own and, upon chasing after its source, comes across Misaka 9982.
29	5	"Project Level 6 Shift"; Transliteration: "Reberu Shikkusu Shifuto Keikaku" (Japanese: 絶対能力進化計画(レベル6シフトけいかく))	Daisuke Takashima	Seishi Minakami	Yūichi Nihei	May 10, 2013
After unwillingly helped her rescue a kitten from a tree, Mikoto tries to question Misaka 9982 but is unable to decipher a codeword that the clone gave. She follows her around in case she returns to her facility, but they end up doing some sisterly activities instead. Later that evening, as Misaka 9982 points out that she is not returning to her point of origin, Mikoto leaves her with the Gekota badge she won earlier. After Kazari helped her in decoding the codeword, Mikoto is horrified to learn about Project Level 6 Shift, in which 20,000 Sisters from Project Radio Noise are to be killed in 20,000 battles to evolve Academy City's most powerful Level 5 esper, Accelerator, into Level 6. Whilst learning of this, Misaka 9982 engages in her assigned battle with Accelerator and finds herself helpless against his reflective abilities. Fleeing the railway yard, she attempts a sneak attack on him using a planted mine, only for him to survive and her leg to tear off. Mikoto arrives on the scene, only to look in horror as Accelerator crushes Misaka 9982 to death with a train and sends her in a furious rage.
30	6	"I... Can See All of You"; Transliteration: "Atashi... Minna no Koto Mieteru kara" (Japanese: あたし...みんなのこと見えてるから)	Kazuhiko Ishii	Seishi Minakami	Michio Fukuda	May 17, 2013
Mikoto unleashes her anger at Accelerator, who quickly deduces she is the original, and further enrages upon seeing Misaka 9982's torn leg and hearing Accelerator's selfish reasons for participating in the experiment. However, even her most powerful attacks are simply reflected by his ability. Just then, the fight is halted by the arrival of dozens of other Sisters, who request Accelerator to stop fighting Mikoto to avoid throwing off the experiment's calculations. As Accelerator takes his leave, Mikoto feels no comfort in hearing the Sisters' acknowledgment of themselves being as nothing more than guinea pigs. After a restless night, Mikoto is approached by Shinobu, who explains why she chose to oppose the experiment. Having been called back from Project Radio Noise to assist in Project Level 6 Shift, Shinobu got to see the sensitive side of one of the Sisters and became unable to see them as anything other than human. Upon hearing this, Mikoto takes it upon herself to destroy the facilities involved in the experiment, keeping this a secret from Kuroko and the others.
31	7	"I... I Want to Be of Help to You, Sissy"; Transliteration: "Onee-sama no Chikara ni Naritai desu no" (Japanese: お姉さまの力になりたいですの)	Kouhei Hatano	Yasunori Yamada	Shigehito Takayanagi	May 24, 2013
Eliminating as many facilities involved with Project Level 6 Shift through electronic warfare before she gets shut out from their communication lines, Mikoto starts spending several nights attacking the other facilities directly. Kuroko, who has grown concerned about Mikoto constantly being out at night, comes across a group of girls who are looking for a "lucky card", based on an urban legend spawned from the cash card incident. The next day, Kuroko encounters one of the girls, Minori, saving her from being hit by a car during her search, hearing how she wanted to find a lucky item for her friend who is moving away. After pointing out cash cards would be out of the question since they would need to be turned into Judgment, Mii suggests that they instead search for a four-leaf clover. During their search, Kazari and Ruiko give Kuroko some assurance that Mikoto, along with themselves, appreciates her efforts. Both Kuroko and Mii find four-leaved clovers, with Kuroko keeping hers and resolving to always wait for Mikoto. Meanwhile, as Mikoto manages to dwindle the remaining facilities to two, Keitz Nokleben, a higher up in the project, prepares a counter-plan.
32	8	"ITEM"; Transliteration: "Aitemu" (Japanese: Item(アイテム))	Katsushi Sakurabi	Jukki Hanada	Yasuo Muroi	May 31, 2013
With only two facilities remaining, Keitz calls upon the service of the mercenary team ITEM. As Mikoto infiltrates one of these facilities, she finds herself against one of its members, Frenda Seivelun, who causes trouble for her using flammable tape and stuffed dolls containing bombs. Meanwhile, Shinobu arrives at the other remaining facility, where they are attempting to transport the data whilst the other facility is being attacked. Mikoto chases down Frenda, who fills the room up with nitrogen and bluffs that it is an explosive gas to prevent Mikoto from using her electricity against her. However, Mikoto, refusing to simply give up and be killed, manages to fight back against Frenda, leading to her bluff becoming exposed. As Mikoto tries to interrogate Frenda, who is unable to respond due to being shocked by her, she is suddenly attacked by ITEM's leader and the fourth-ranked Level 5 esper, Shizuri Mugino.
33	9	"AIM Stalker"; Transliteration: "ĒMU Sutōkā" (Japanese: 能力追跡(AIMストーカー))	Naoyuki Konno	Yasunori Yamada	Naoyuki Konno	June 7, 2013
Mikoto attempts to escape from Shizuri's attacks, which proves difficult due to ITEM's third member, Rikō Takitsubo, using her AIM Stalker ability to help Shizuri and Frenda home their attacks on her position. Meanwhile, Shinobu, who felt Mikoto should not have to carry her burden alone, sneaks into the basement of her facility where the incubated Sisters are being held, hoping to install emotions into all of the remaining Sisters via the Misaka Network in the hopes that it may move the organizers to suspend the experiments. However, she is apprehended by ITEM's fourth member, Saiai Kinuhata, who was guarding the facility in case a second party was involved in the attacks. Shinobu manages to get the program installing, but it is suddenly blocked by an unforeseen error code. Shinobu fires a gun at Saiai, but her attack fails due to Saiai's Offense Armor ability, and she is taken into custody. Back at the other facility, a weakened Mikoto is forced to use her ability to deflect Shizuri's Meltdowner attack, making her realize who the intruder's identity is. Learning of this, Shizuri decides to send the injured Frenda and exhausted Rikō away so she can settle things with Mikoto herself.
34	10	"Meltdowner"; Transliteration: "Merutodaunā" (Japanese: 原子崩し(メルトダウナー))	Takashi Ikehata	Michihiro Tsuchiya	Yūichi Nihei	June 14, 2013
Coming face to face with Shizuri, Mikoto uses some of the explosive dolls that Frenda inadvertently left behind to compensate for her weakened powers. Shizuri fights off these dolls by using silicon shards cards to divide her lasers, but Mikoto manages to knock her out with one of the remaining dolls. After finding and destroying the facility's data bank, Mikoto finds herself on the run from an angered Shizuri. Fleeing to a bridge, Mikoto manages to get the best of Shizuri by using Frenda's flammable tape to collapse the walkway underneath her and cause her to fall. As Mikoto makes her escape, Shizuri manages to learn about Project Level 6 Shift from one of the staff and decides it would be more amusing to let Mikoto suffer. The next day, Mikoto investigates the remaining facility, only to find it completely abandoned, allegedly having gone bankrupt. Believing the experiments to finally be over, Mikoto comes across Toma Kamijo by the vending machines.
35	11	"The Vending Machine"; Transliteration: "Jidō Hanbaiki" (Japanese: 自動販売機)	Kazuhiko Ishii	Kurasumi Sunayama	Tatsuyuki Nagai	June 21, 2013
Mikoto runs into Tōma, who appears to have trouble remembering who she is, and vandalizes a vending machine to spit out drinks to compensate for some money it had stolen from him. Kuroko arrives on the scene and, despite not being pleased over the presence of a supposed "boyfriend", feels relieved that Mikoto appears to be back to her cheerful self. However, Mikoto's joy is short-lived when another Sister, Misaka 10031, appears before her, telling her in private that the experiments are still ongoing. Horrified to learn more Sisters have died because of her, Mikoto ends up yelling at Misaka 10031 for reminding her of Misaka 9982. Later discovering that countless other facilities have picked up the experiment, Mikoto comes to realize that her enemy is Academy City itself. Meanwhile, Accelerator recalls how he was first approached about Project Level 6 Shift. Deciding that she will need to do something drastic to stop the experiments, Mikoto feels relieved that Kuroko would still perform her duty as a Judgment officer should she be labeled a criminal for doing so.
36	12	"Tree Diagram"; Transliteration: "Tsurī Daiaguramu" (Japanese: 樹形図の設計者(ツリーダイアグラム))	Masahiro Sonoda	Jukki Hanada	Yūichi Nihei	June 28, 2013
Mikoto resolves to hack into and destroy the Tree Diagram, the supercomputer responsible for the experiment's calculations, in the hope she may be able to stop them. Meanwhile, Tōma encounters Misaka 10032, who coerces him into helping her look after an abandoned kitten she had found. As Tōma goes into a bookstore to look for a book to help him with his cat, Misaka 10032 goes off to observe Accelerator as he begins his scheduled battle with Misaka 10031. Arriving at Tree Diagram's control center, hoping to hack into Tree Diagram to order a halt to the experiment, Mikoto is confused to find it not only heavily low on security but completely abandoned as well. Hacking into the system, she is horrified to learn the truth, in that Tree Diagram had been destroyed for months, with the experiments continuing regardless.
37	13	"Accelerator"; Transliteration: "Akuserarēta" (Japanese: 一方通行(アクセラレータ))	Kensuke Ishikawa	Michihiro Tsuchiya	Kensuke Ishikawa	July 5, 2013
Realizing that with Tree Diagram destroyed, Mikoto begins to despair, knowing she has no way of stopping the experiments. To cling onto her cause, she mercilessly destroys another facility, but loses all hope when she sees a live feed of Misaka 10031 being killed by Accelerator. As Accelerator reminisces about his first experiment and his first time killing a Sister, Tōma discovers Misaka 10031's corpse and calls Anti-Skill to investigate it, only to find it gone when they arrive, with no evidence it ever occurred. After Anti-Skill leaves, Misaka 10032 and the rest of the Sisters appear before Tōma, who comes to learn the true nature of the experiment. Tōma heads for the Tokiwadai dorms to try to get some answers from Mikoto, who at the same time is contemplating her last resort.
38	14	"The Promise"; Transliteration: "Yakusoku" (Japanese: 約束)	Daisuke Takashima	Jukki Hanada	Kiyoko Sayama	July 12, 2013
Tōma arrives at the Tokiwadai dorms where he is reluctantly greeted by Kuroko. When the Tokiwadai Dorm Supervisor comes by for an inspection, Kuroko is forced to hide Tōma under Mikoto's bed due to his Imagine Breaker negating her teleportation. There, he finds the details concerning Project Level 6 Shift stuffed inside a teddy bear, learning that Misaka 10032's experiment is next. Tōma leaves and finds Mikoto at the bridge and confronts her about her actions. Mikoto feels convinced that letting herself be immediately killed by Accelerator is the only way to stop the experiments, as it would disprove scientists' assumptions that it would take multiple hits to kill her. However, Tōma, feeling her way will not save anyone, decides to stand in her way, refusing to fight back or even defend himself from Mikoto's lightning. Mikoto's emotions soon build up into a large shock wave that Tōma takes the full brunt of, helping her to see his resolve. After regaining consciousness and being greeted by a tearful Mikoto, Tōma decides to defeat Accelerator in her stead, making the experiment futile, showing that the strongest esper can be defeated by a mere Level 0 like him. Despite Mikoto's objection, Tōma rushes where Misaka 10032's experiment is being held.
39	15	"Kamijo Toma" (Japanese: 最弱(かみじょうとうま))	Katsushi Sakurabi	Kurasumi Sunayama	Satoshi Iwataki	July 19, 2013
Tōma arrives at the site where Accelerator and Misaka 10032 are fighting and states his firm desire to rescue the Sister. As their fight begins, Tōma initially struggles against Accelerator as he launches projectiles at him and sets off a dust explosion. However, Accelerator is shocked when Tōma can punch him with his right hand without being affected by his ability, also coming as a surprise to Mikoto, who had soon after followed him to the scene. Angered, Accelerator starts using his ability to manipulate the wind, creating a huge hurricane that and hurting to Tōma. Mikoto attempts to save Tōma, only to realize it would be futile upon witnessing Accelerator begin to use his power to compress the air and create a plasma storm that would wipe out everything. She goes over to Misaka 10032 and begs for her help in protecting Tōma's dream. Moved by these words, Misaka 10032 uses the Misaka Network to command the other Sisters in Academy City to manipulate the city's windmills with their electricity, affecting Accelerator's calculations of stabilizing the plasma. As Mikoto prepares to stand off against Accelerator once more, Tōma gathers the strength to stand up.
40	16	"Sisterhood"; Transliteration: "Shimai" (Japanese: 姉妹)	Ken'ichi Kasai	Yasunori Yamada	Yoshimitsu Ohashi	July 26, 2013
Accelerator demands to know why Mikoto is protecting Misaka 10032, to which she responds that it is simply because she is her sister. Before Accelerator can attempt to kill them, Tōma manages to regain his footing and uses the remainder of his strength to knock Accelerator out with one final punch. As he loses consciousness, Accelerator realizes that the reason he wanted to become a Level 6 in the first place was so that he would not have to attract so much attention or hurt anyone anymore. After the experiments are canceled as a result of Accelerator's defeat, Mikoto goes to the hospital to visit Tōma, who assures her that even though many Sisters died, it was thanks to her that they got to be born in the first place. Afterward, Mikoto takes a walk with Misaka 10032, where they play with a pair of young sisters at the playground and think about the future that lies ahead. The next day, Mikoto borrows Ruiko's kitchen to make some handmade cookies for Tōma as thanks for his help. Despite being too embarrassed to give them to him, Mikoto feels pleased when he finally calls her by her real name.
41	17	"Study Group"; Transliteration: "Benkyō-kai" (Japanese: 勉強会)	Takashi Ikehata	Michihiro Tsuchiya	Kiyoko Sayama	August 2, 2013
When asked by the Tokiwadai Dorm Supervisor to explain her absences, Mikoto bluffs that she was having study sessions with her friends. As Ruiko arranges a get-together so she can hear who Mikoto was making cookies for the other day, Kuroko comes across Minori again before being dragged along by Mitsuko Kongō to a pet shop. Meanwhile, Mikoto visits Heaven Canceller to hear about the status of the Sisters, and learns that they are being "reconfigured" so they may live longer than their originally intended two-year lifespan. As Mikoto and Kuroko meet up at a family restaurant, they come across Shizuri and Frenda, leading to an awkward argument between Kuroko and Frenda over their respective partners, which is inevitably followed by an explosive punishment. After having a nabe party with everyone, Kuroko is relieved to see Mikoto back to her usual self.
42	18	"Moving"; Transliteration: "O Hikkoshi" (Japanese: お引越し)	Daisuke Takashima	Kurasumi Sunayama	Yūichi Nihei	August 16, 2013 (Note: A 22-minute preview of A Certain Magical Index: The Movie – The Miracle of Endymion aired on August 9, 2013, in place of episode 43)
A mysterious organization oversees ITEM as they fight against a group of mechs. The next day, Mikoto and her friends visit Banri, who is due to be discharged from the hospital soon and will be moving into an apartment with Erii. As the gang discusses the move, Kuroko and Kazari reveal Judgement will be on duty for the upcoming Academy City Research Exhibition Assembly, where the city's top genius students will attend. Meanwhile, Mitsuko uses her power to stop a purse thief but gets berated by a certain man for her actions. As the group gets together to celebrate Banri being discharged, Kuroko and Kazari are called off for Judgment duties when the city's traffic signals suddenly go out. After finishing her duties, Kazari gives a box of taiyaki to Erii, serving as a memento of when she first told Erii about her ability of temperature preservation, and the two have a tearful farewell as roommates. As the group takes a detour home, they come across a curious white-haired girl named Febri, who appears to know Mikoto. Meanwhile, the mysterious organization begins its next plan to show its power against espers.
43	19	"Academy City Research Exhibit Assembly"; Transliteration: "Gakuen-toshi Kenkyū Happyōkai" (Japanese: 学園都市研究発表会)	Keiji Gotoh	Hiroyuki Yoshino	Keiji Gotoh	August 23, 2013
The girls are unable to find out any more information from Febri, who appears to be a bit cautious around Mikoto and takes a liking to Ruiko. After Febri spends a night with Ruiko at Kazari's apartment, the group, believing Febri to be a Child Error, makes arrangements for her to be moved to the orphanage in Asunaro Park in a week. As the gang heads to where the Academy City Research Exhibition Assembly will be held, Ruiko sets up some time for Mikoto to get along with Febri on their own. When Febri wanders off while Mikoto is not looking, the man from before spots her and sends some security bots after her. Luckily, Mikoto manages to rescue Febri, who apologizes for making her worry and comes to accept her. With Mikoto now involved, the man and his colleagues decide to include her in their experiments.
44	20	"Febri"; Transliteration: "Feburi" (Japanese: フェブリ)	Yōhei Suzuki	Yasunori Yamada	Kiyoko Sayama	August 30, 2013
As Aiho becomes curious over how the security bots functioned without any batteries, Mii treats Mikoto and the others by taking them to the public baths, where Mikoto lets Febri keep her rare pink Gekota finger puppet from her collection. Whilst heading home, the girls are led on a detour to a warehouse, where they are attacked by a mech. As Mikoto fights against the mech, which seems resilient to her electricity, the mech suddenly stops functioning when it comes close to attacking Febri, allowing Mitsuko to defeat it with her Aero Hand ability. After Mikoto discovers the mech to be curiously unmanned, Febri comes down with a fever and is admitted into the hospital. Meanwhile, it is shown that Shinobu is working with the group targeting Febri. Back at the hospital, Mitsuko informs the others about how she, Kinuho Wannai and Ma'aya Awatsuki came to learn that the man from before was attempting to "reclaim" Febri. The next morning as Febri seems to make a full recovery, Heaven Canceller informs Mikoto in private that Febri is in fact an artificial human.
45	21	"Darkness"; Transliteration: "Yami" (Japanese: 闇)	Katsushi Sakurabi	Michihiro Tsuchiya	Yūichi Nihei	September 6, 2013
Heaven Canceller explains to Mikoto that Febri's body secretes a poison and requires her to suck special lollipops to neutralize it. Whilst keeping this a secret from the others, Mikoto runs into Misaka 10032 who, having visited Febri the previous night, informs her that Febri had been wanting to meet her big sister. She also reveals Febri gained her knowledge via the Testament, leading Mikoto to believe Shinobu is involved. After receiving a call from Mitsuko about the importance of trusting friends, Mikoto decides to inform Kuroko and the others about Febri's condition, becoming surprised and relieved to find they are more than willing to help. As Mikoto and her friends try to find clues related to Febri, Aiho gives Mikoto a capsule found in the unmanned mech suit. Heaven Canceller examines the capsule which contains a strand of hair similar to Febri's, possibly belonging to her sister. However, he also reveals to Mikoto that Febri only has enough lollipops to stay alive for another 72 hours. With Mikoto deciding to face the darkness of Academy City once more to save Febri, Heaven Canceller arranges for her to meet someone familiar with the underground, that being Therestina Kihara Lifeline.
46	22	"STUDY"	Daisuke Takashima	Michihiro Tsuchiya	Kiyoko Sayama	September 13, 2013
Mikoto refuses to leave until she gets information from Therestina to save Febri. Therestina hesitantly reveals that Febri is an artificial human called a Chemicaloid, which her creators were going to showcase at the Academy City Research Exhibition Assembly. Mitsuko, Kinoho, and Maaya help Kazari identify the mysterious man as Haruki Aritomi, a longtime winner of the Academy City Research Exhibition Assembly. Kazari discovers that Aritomi and other student geniuses formed the STUDY Corporation and purchased a factory, which Kazari suspects are where Febri and her lollipops were being made. Mikoto heads to the factory, spots ITEM fighting mechs sent by STUDY, and overhears that the mechs are controlled via a form of psychogenesis by the capsules inside them. Mikoto then enters the factory and finds Shinobu, who had taught Febri how to say Mikoto's name so she would be protected by her. Shinobu gives Mikoto the data to make more neutralizer lollipops, only to learn that the information is fake. Aritomi orders Shinobu to inject Mikoto with a tranquilizer in exchange for the real neutralizer data, but after Shinobu does it, he destroys the data. Febri is revealed to be a spare to his true project, Janie.
47	23	"Dawn of a Revolution (Silent Party)"; Transliteration: "Kakumei Mimei (Sairento Pātī)" (Japanese: 革命未明(Silent Party))	Takashi Ikehata	Hiroyuki Yoshino	Yoshimitsu Ohashi & Yūichi Nihei	September 20, 2013
Aritomi reveals he started Project Chemicaloid, which created Janie and Febri due to his bitterness that espers gain fame and recognition while intellectuals like him are ignored. To finally show their power, STUDY found a way to mass-produce espers which will bring forth a revolution upon Academy City tomorrow. Later, Shinobu explains to Mikoto how she was sold to STUDY after being captured by ITEM and was forced to work on the Chemicaloids, which were born from her research, becoming determined to save them. Using her electricity to counter the paralysis in her body, Mikoto assures Shinobu that she does not need to take everything on by herself. Kuroko and the others arrive to rescue Mikoto, whilst Shinobu chooses to stay behind to do her part. After learning that 20,000 mechs, controlled by Janie's Diffusion Ghost ability, have been snuck into the Academy City Research Exhibition Assembly, with Anti-Skill prevented from interfering, the girls make preparations to save Shinobu, Febri, and Janie. The next morning, Kuroko, Kazari, Ruiko, Mii, Mitsuko, Kinoho, and Ma'aya step up to face the mechs, whilst Mikoto and Febri head off in search of Janie.
48	24	"Eternal Party"	Tatsuyuki Nagai & Naoyuki Konno	Hiroyuki Yoshino	Tatsuyuki Nagai & Naoyuki Konno	September 27, 2013
The entirety of Judgment joins in fighting off against STUDY's mechs. Meanwhile, Mikoto and Febri arrive at STUDY's hidden base at a stadium. STUDY responds by sending a signal to cut off everyone's communications and sending more advanced mechs after each group. However, they overcome this with Erii and Banri's network of telepaths, and Kazari and Ruiko piloting the mech that Mitsuko's father sent over, whilst ITEM destroys the mechs sent after Mikoto. Mikoto and Febri soon arrive underground, where Aritomi resorts to initiating a cluster missile containing Diffusion Ghost from space that will destroy Academy City by causing a chain reaction with the city's AIM fields. Aritomi attempts to kill himself but is stopped by Mikoto, who is determined to save everyone. Mikoto rides in Mitsuko's mech as it launches into the atmosphere and uses the mech as ammunition for a massive railgun to destroy the missile. After freeing Janie from STUDY's control and reuniting her with Febri, who is given more neutralizer lollipops, Shinobu makes plans to bring the twins to an overseas research facility to cure their condition. After saying their goodbyes to Shinobu and the twins, Mikoto and her friends discuss their upcoming vacation.

== Cast and characters ==
=== Main ===
- Rina Satō as Mikoto Misaka
- Satomi Arai as Kuroko Shirai
- Aki Toyosaki as Kazari Uiharu
- Kanae Itō as Ruiko Saten
- Nozomi Sasaki as the Sisters
- Atsushi Abe as Toma Kamijo

=== Recurring ===
- Minako Kotobuki as Mitsuko Kongō
- Haruka Tomatsu as Kinuho Wannai
- Yoshino Nanjō as Ma'aya Awatsuki
- Kana Ueda as Mī Konori
- Ikumi Hayama as Shinobu Nunotaba
- Nobuhiko Okamoto as Accelerator
- Ami Koshimizu as Shizuri Mugino
- Maaya Uchida as Frenda Seivelun
- Chinatsu Akasaki as Saiai Kinuhata
- Aya Suzaki as Rikō Takitsubo
- Yutaka Nakano as Heaven Canceller
- Iori Nomizu as Febrie

== Production ==
=== Development ===
A sequel to the 2009 anime television series A Certain Scientific Railgun was announced at Dengeki 20th Anniversary Festival in October 2012. A few days after it was announced, J.C.Staff was confirmed to be returning from the first season to produce the sequel, with the returning staff members Tatsuyuki Nagai as the director, Seishi Minakami as the series composition writer, and Yuichi Tanaka as the character animation designer. The series would be premiered in 2013, later announced to be on April 12, and consists of twenty-four episodes.

=== Writing ===
The series adapted the Sisters story arc from A Certain Scientific Railgun manga series. J.C.Staff producer Yuji Matsukura was glad that the popular story arc would be animated in the second season since it was still in the middle of serialization during the production of the first season. Nagai revealed that an original summer vacation story would be included in the series upon the conclusion of the Sisters story arc.

=== Casting ===
In October 2012, Rina Satō, Satomi Arai, Aki Toyosaki, and Kanae Itō were confirmed to be reprising their respective roles from the first season as Mikoto Misaka, Kuroko Shirai, Kazari Uiharu, and Ruiko Saten, with the addition of Nozomi Sasaki as the Sisters and Atsushi Abe as Toma Kamijo, both reprising their roles from A Certain Magical Index television series. In March 2013, Ikumi Hayama was revealed to be voicing Shinobu Nunotaba, a researcher associated with Level 6 Shift Project. In May 2013, additional voice actors were announced to be voicing the members of dark side organization ITEM, including Ami Koshimizu as Shizuri Mugino, Chinatsu Akasaki as Saiai Kinuhata, Maaya Uchida as Frenda Seivelun, and Aya Suzaki as Rikō Takitsubo.

Funimation announced in April 2014 the English dub cast for the series, including Mariela Ortiz as Nunotaba, Leah Clark as Seivelun, Lydia Mackay as Mugino, Apphia Yu as Kinuhata, and Megan Shipman as Takitsubo.

=== Music ===
Maiko Iuchi of I've Sound served as the composer of A Certain Scientific Railgun S. The second season uses six pieces of theme music: two openings and four endings. For the first sixteen episodes, the opening theme is "Sisters' Noise" by fripSide whilst the main ending theme is "Grow Slowly" by Yuka Iguchi. The ending theme for episodes 11 and 14 is "Stand Still" by Iguchi. From episode 17 onwards, the opening theme is "Eternal Reality" by fripSide whilst the ending theme is "Links" (リンクス, Rinkusu) by Sachika Misawa. The ending theme for episode 23 is "Infinia" (インフィニア) by Misawa.

== Marketing ==
A TV commercial ad, narrated by Satō, for A Certain Scientific Railgun S was aired on AT-X in March 2013. In the same month, Satō, Arai, Toyosaki, and Itō were present at Anime Contents Expo 2013 in Makuhari Messe to promote the series, where a 90-second promo video was released. Additional three TV commercial ads were aired on Tokyo MX in April 2013, each narrated by Arai, Toyosaki, and Itō.

== Release ==
=== Broadcast ===
A Certain Scientific Railgun S began airing in Japan on AT-X on April 12, 2013, on Tokyo MX on April 13, on MBS on April 14, on CBC on April 18, on BS11 on April 20, and on GYT on April 24.

=== Home media ===
Japanese Blu-ray & DVD release
Vol.	Episodes	Release date	Ref.
1	1–3	July 24, 2013	
2	4–6	August 28, 2013	
3	7–9	September 25, 2013	
4	10–12	October 23, 2013	
5	13–15	November 27, 2013	
6	16–18	December 25, 2013	
7	19–21	January 29, 2014	
8	22–24	February 26, 2014	

Geneon Universal Entertainment released eight Blu-ray and DVD volumes of A Certain Scientific Railgun S in Japan starting July 24, 2013. Each volume contains a bonus novel written by Kazuma Kamachi titled A Certain Magical Index: Necessarius Special Admission Test. Funimation released a DVD volume containing the first twelve episodes of the series in North America on July 1, 2014, and another DVD volume containing the final twelve episodes on August 19, while a Blu-ray and DVD combo set containing the full season was released on January 19, 2016. Manga Entertainment released a Blu-ray and DVD combo set for the series in the United Kingdom on August 21, 2017. Crunchyroll released the season on Blu-ray in North America on March 4, 2025, and will release it in the United Kingdom on March 31.

Funimation began streaming the season on April 14, 2013, while it was added to Crunchyroll in December 2016 and to Tubi TV in December 2017. Hulu released it in Japan on March 24, 2022. Muse Asia began streaming it on their official YouTube channel on June 30, 2022.

== Reception ==
=== Critical response ===
Rebecca Silverman of Anime News Network gave a 'B' rating to A Certain Scientific Railgun S, lauding Misaka's appearance in it, and stating that the Sisters story arc resulted in "increased interest" rather than feeling rehashed, given its earlier portrayal in the first season of A Certain Magical Index. Ian Wolf of Anime UK News scored the series 8 out of 10, describing the Sisters storyline as "feel[ing] a lot more emotional" than in Index, but also noted that some may feel that it is "reused" and indicates a "lack of imagination", despite being told in a different approach (from Misaka's viewpoint rather than Kamijo's).

=== Scientific accuracy ===
Tsukasa Kano, a science writer who graduated from Nihon University and member of the Space Authors Club, discussed human cloning in A Certain Scientific Railgun S. He stated that there is a possibility but currently impractical due to the low yield rate among humans, while contradicted the 14-day development of a clone to a full appearance of a junior high school student as depicted in the series since it naturally needs to grow for up to 14 years, which requires 80,000 eggs harvested from people and 80,000 women to serve as "borrowed bellies" for impregnation.

== Other media ==
A puzzle game by ASCII Media Works based on A Certain Scientific Railgun S, titled A Certain Scientific Railgun S Puzzle, was released on July 26, 2013. An 80-page official visual book for the series was released on March 27, 2014, which was bundled with a Blu-ray disc containing a brand-new OVA episode titled "All the Important Things I Learned in a Bathhouse" (大事なことはぜんぶ銭湯に教わった, Daiji na Koto wa Zenbu Sentō ni Osowatta).
