= Mikoto Misaka =

Fictional character from the A Certain Magical Index series

- A Certain Magical Index and A Certain Scientific Railgun character
- Mikoto Misaka as seen alongside her clones in an illustration from A Certain Magical Index. Art by Kiyotaka Haimura.
- First appearance: A Certain Magical Index vol.1, prologue "The Tale of the Boy Who Could Kill Illusions – The_Imagine-Breaker." (序章 幻想殺しの少年のお話 The_Imagine-Breaker.)
- Created by: Kazuma Kamachi
- Voiced by: Rina Satō; (Japanese); Brittney Karbowski; (English)

In-universe information
- Full name: Mikoto Misaka
- Nicknames: Railgun; Biribiri (Note: Translated as "Zapper" in the English dub by Funimation Productions and "Sparky" in the English release of the manga by Seven Seas Entertainment); Electromaster
- Species: Human
- Gender: Female
- Occupation: Student
- Family: Misuzu Misaka (mother); Tabigake Misaka (father); Misaka Sisters and Last Order (clones)
- Nationality: Japanese

Mikoto Misaka (Japanese: 御坂 美琴, Hepburn: Misaka Mikoto) is a fictional character created by Kazuma Kamachi and first illustrated by Kiyotaka Haimura. She is a major character in the A Certain Magical Index light novel series and the main protagonist of its manga spin-off series A Certain Scientific Railgun.

As an Academy City Resident, Mikoto is one of the most powerful espers in the city, ranking at Level 5 and possessing powers associated with electricity. Despite this, her personality comes off as brash, short-tempered, and often has a rough relationship with her younger friend Kuroko Shirai, though they do tend to get along at times. Though she appears as a major character in Magical Index, she plays a much larger role in the spin-off Scientific Railgun.

Mikoto's character was written as a means to showcase the social hierarchy of the world, as well as the power of the main character. In early stages of development, Mikoto was originally going to have long hair, something in which would apply to the titular character later on. There were also plans for her hair to act as a semiconductor to enable her railgun ability, but this idea was scrapped.

She has been praised by both fans and critics alike for her personality and relationships with other characters of the series. Many pieces of merchandise have also been made using the character's likeness.

== Creation and conception ==
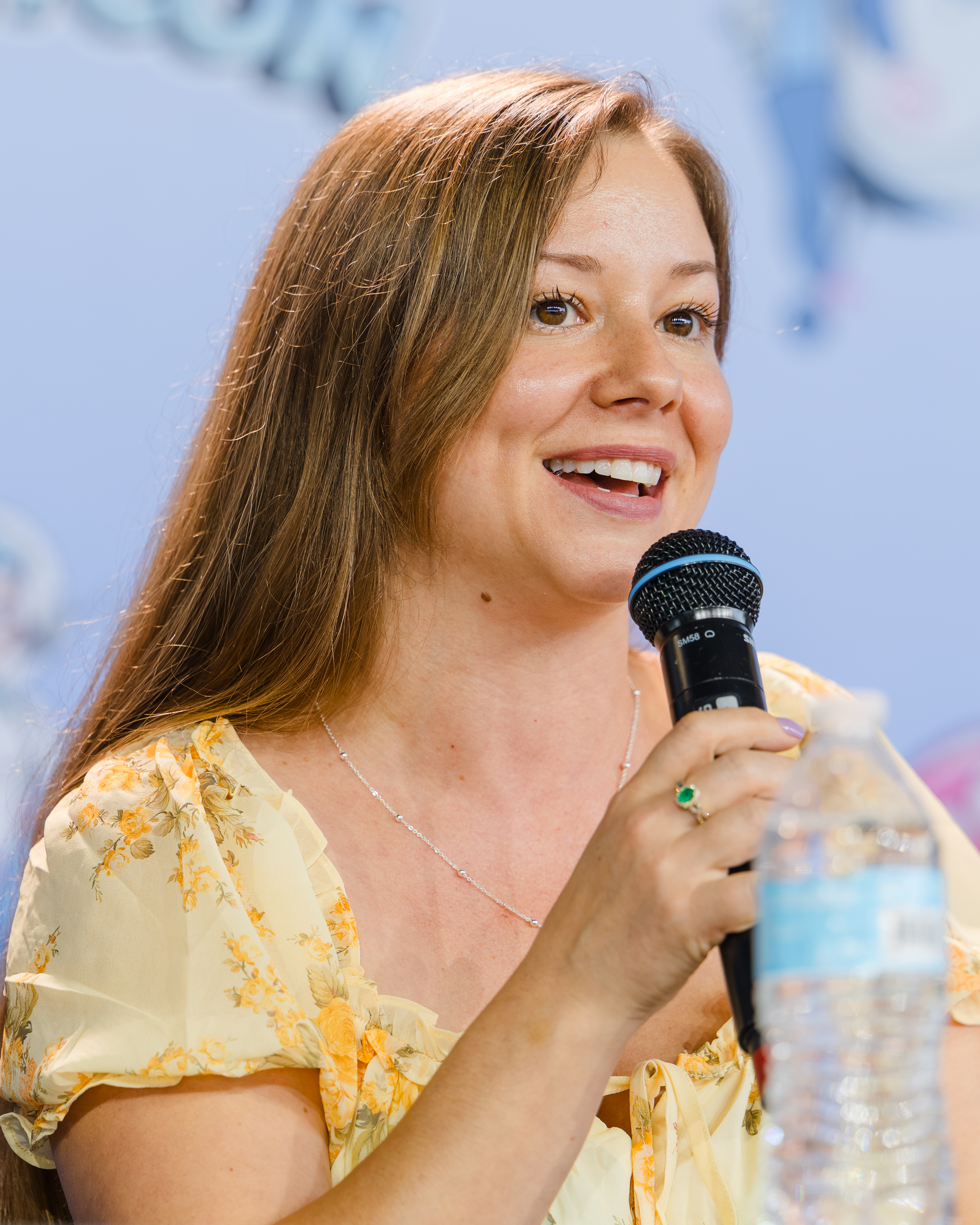
In the Funimation Entertainment dubs of the franchise, Mikoto is voiced in English by Brittney Karbowski.

According to Kamachi, Mikoto was created as "a way of showing the existence of a power class (hierarchy) in a way that is easy to understand". Specifically, Mikoto was designed so that despite the fact that she was a character with strong and versatile attack power abilities, she was still inferior to Toma Kamijo. He also added that he made her "easy to write in any scene, from serious to comedic".

At the design stage, Mikoto was originally planned to have long hair. There were also plans for her to "fire" her Railgun power with hair bundled as rails. However, it was scrapped because the long hairstyle was thought to be more synonymous with Index's character.

== Characteristics and appearances ==
Mikoto as she appears in the anime adaptation of A Certain Scientific Railgun

Mikoto is an eighth-grade junior high school student at Tokiwadai Middle School. She is ranked third of the seven Level Five (most powerful) espers in Academy City. She has the ability to use electricity in various ways, such as shooting it, using it to shoot other items as projectiles (hence her nickname "Railgun"), and electromagnetism. As a child, she was tricked into giving up her DNA map, which allowed scientists to make 20,001 clones of her for experimental use.

=== In A Certain Magical Index ===
In the A Certain Magical Index series, she appears as a friend of Index's main protagonist Toma Kamijo. Toma often gets involved in her affairs and helps her get out of trouble multiple times, even stopping her from committing suicide once. Due to this, she develops tsundere-like feelings toward Toma. She also appears in the spin-off movie A Certain Magical Index: The Movie – The Miracle of Endymion, as well as the series' various spin-off novels and games.

=== In A Certain Scientific Railgun ===
In A Certain Scientific Railgun, she appears as the series' main protagonist. In this series, it focuses more on her relationship with Kuroko Shirai, Kazari Uiharu, and Ruiko Saten. However, it does eventually cross-over with the story of Magical Index, which it retells from her perspective, thus giving new background to several of the events of that series. She also appears in its spin-off series A Certain Scientific Railgun: Astral Buddy, as well as the series' other various spin-off media.

=== Other appearances ===
Mikoto appears in Kamachi's one-volume crossover series Toaru Majutsu no Heavy na Zashiki-warashi ga Kantan na Satsujinki no Konkatsu Jijou (とある魔術のへヴィーな座敷童が簡単な殺人妃の婚活事情; lit. A Certain Magical Heavy Zashiki-Warashi Deals With a Simple Killer Princess' Marriage Circumstances). She also appears in the crossover video game Dengeki Bunko: Fighting Climax as a playable character.

Mikoto makes a cameo appearance in the eighth episode of the anime series Okami-san and Her Seven Companions. She was presented as a potential candidate to be married to the young millionaire Nezumi Chūtaro.

Mikoto appears in the Death Battle episode "Killua VS Misaka (Hunter X Hunter VS A Certain Magical Index)", in which she fights and kills Killua Zoldyck from Hunter × Hunter.

== Reception ==
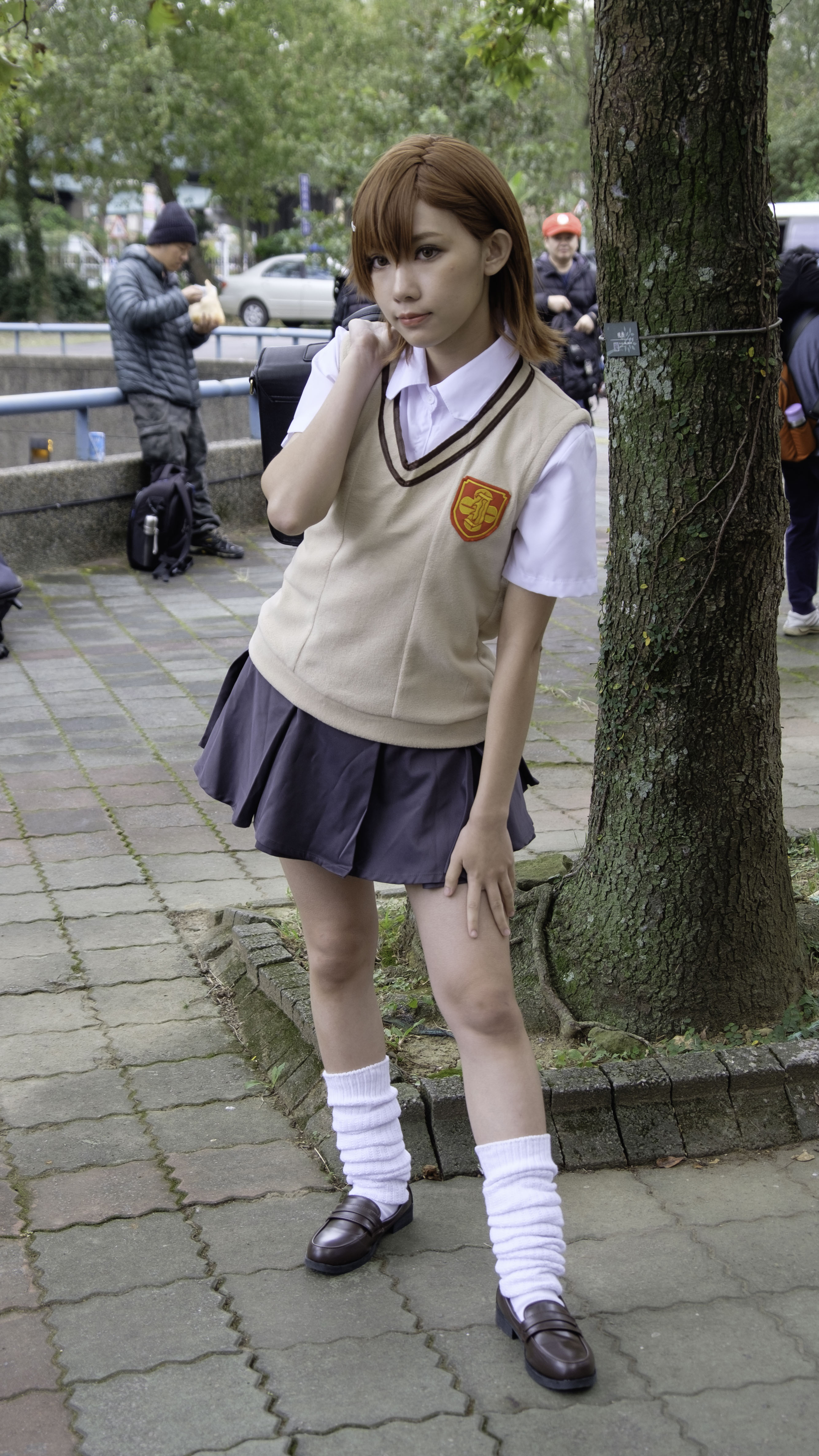
A fan cosplaying as Mikoto

=== Popularity ===
In a 2010 poll asking people what fictional character they would name their potential child after, Mikoto was first on the list of female names.

Many products and other merchandise have been made depicting her, such as a computer, nendoroids, plush dolls, action figures, and soccer jerseys. A kick-able vending machine and special coins have also been made, both of which are based on actions the character performs in the series.

=== Accolades and critical reception ===
Mikoto was awarded best female character in the Kono Light Novel ga Sugoi! guidebook nine times in ten years, winning it more times than any other female character in the history of the publication. In the years she did not win, she ranked fifth in 2009, second in 2015, third in 2020, and seventh in 2021.

She has been well received by critics. Theron Martin from Anime News Network praised her character and her relationships with other characters of the series, saying that it was entertaining to watch. Chris Beveridge from The Fandom Post also praised her character and her relationships with other characters. In their review of the first two light novel volumes, Matthew Warner from The Fandom Post criticized Mikoto, saying she had potential but was underdeveloped. However, in their review of the third volume, they praised Mikoto, saying that she got the attention she deserved.

Mikoto's involvement in the Magical Index plot was also praised. Chris Beveridge from The Fandom Post said that he enjoyed watching Toma and Mikoto's relationship unfold, and that he "wanted them to get closer together". Theron Martin from Anime News Network also praised Mikoto's role in the series.

Mikoto's portrayals have also been praised by critics. In her review of A Certain Scientific Railgun S, Rebecca Silverman from Anime News Network praised both the original Japanese and the English dub, however, she gave special praise to Brittney Karbowski's portrayal of Mikoto, stating its worth listening to even to people who don't normally like dubs, and ultimately rating the dubbed version a higher score than the original Japanese version. Theron Martin from the same website also praised Karbowski's performance, saying it was "a good fit for [the character]."

=== Impact ===
Her nickname "Biribiri" (ビリビリ; the Japanese onomatopoeia of electric shocks) was used as inspiration to create the name of the Chinese streaming website Bilibili. The website has also named some of its various features for her and other characters of the series and celebrates her birthday every year on May 2. The Chinese streaming website also owns an esports team named Hangzhou Spark, which was also named with inspiration from the character, as well as having its logos designed after her.

Hsiao Bi-khim, the Vice President of the Republic of China (Taiwan), was nicknamed "Houshan Railgun" (後山電磁炮) because of her namesake same with Mikoto (Chinese: 蕭美琴, Japanese: (御坂 美琴)). "Houshan" refers to Eastern Taiwan, and Hsiao once served as a Member of the Legislative Yuan in Hualien County, which is a county located in Eastern Taiwan.
