= A Certain Scientific Railgun =

Manga spin-off series of A Certain Magical Index

- Cover of the first volume featuring Kuroko Shirai (left) and Mikoto Misaka

とある科学の超電磁砲(レールガン) (Toaru Kagaku no Rērugan)
- Genre: Adventure, science fiction
- Manga
- Written by: Kazuma Kamachi
- Illustrated by: Motoi Fuyukawa
- Published by: MediaWorks (2007–2008); ASCII Media Works (2008–2026)
- English publisher: NA: Seven Seas Entertainment
- Magazine: Dengeki Daioh
- Original run: February 21, 2007 – March 27, 2026
- Volumes: 21
Further information
Anime television series
Directed by	Tatsuyuki Nagai
Produced by	Kazuma Miki; Nobuhiro Nakayama; Satoshi Fujita; Kozue Kaneniwa; Kenji Mine
Written by	Seishi Minakami
Music by	Maiko Iuchi
Studio	J.C.Staff
Licensed by	AUS: Universal/Sony; NA: Funimation; SEA: Muse Communication; UK: Animatsu Entertainment
Original network	AT-X, Chiba TV, MBS, Teletama, tvk, Tokyo MX
English network	NA: Funimation Channel
Original run	October 3, 2009 – March 20, 2010
Episodes	24 + 2 OVAs
Video game
Developer	Shade
Publisher	ASCII Media Works
Genre	Action-adventure game
Platform	PlayStation Portable
Released	December 8, 2011
Anime television series
A Certain Scientific Railgun S
Directed by	Tatsuyuki Nagai
Produced by	Kazuma Miki; Nobuhiro Nakayama; Satoshi Fujita; Kozue Kaneniwa; Kenji Mine; Kentarou Hattori
Written by	Seishi Minakami
Music by	Maiko Iuchi
Studio	J.C.Staff
Licensed by	AUS: Universal/Sony; NA: Funimation; SEA: Muse Communication; UK: Animatsu Entertainment
Original network	AT-X, Tokyo MX
Original run	April 12, 2013 – September 27, 2013
Episodes	24 + OVA
Video game
A Certain Scientific Railgun S Puzzle
Developer	ASCII Media Works
Genre	Puzzle game
Platform	iOS
Released	July 26, 2013
Anime television series
A Certain Scientific Railgun T
Directed by	Tatsuyuki Nagai
Produced by	Kazuma Miki; Kozue Kaneniwa; Kentarou Hattori; Yuuichirou Shiji; Michihisa Abe; Noritomo Isogai; Seihiro Asada; Takehiro Nakakura
Written by	Shougo Yasukawa
Music by	Maiko Iuchi
Studio	J.C.Staff
Licensed by	NA: Funimation
Original network	AT-X, BS11, MBS, Tokyo MX
Original run	January 10, 2020 – September 25, 2020
Episodes	25
Video game
A Certain Scientific Railgun: Spectrum Story
Developer	Now Production
Publisher	D-techno
Genre	Adventure game
Platform	Android; iOS
Released	March 27, 2020
Anime television series
A Certain Scientific Railgun Season 4
Directed by	Tatsuyuki Nagai
Studio	J.C.Staff
Other
A Certain Scientific Railgun: Astral Buddy (spin-off)
- icon

A Certain Scientific Railgun (Japanese: とある科学の超電磁砲(レールガン), Hepburn: Toaru Kagaku no Rērugan) (Note: Official title is A Certain Magical Index Side Story: A Certain Scientific Railgun (とある魔術の禁書目録(インデックス)外伝 とある科学の超電磁砲(レールガン), Toaru Majutsu no Indekkusu Gaiden: Toaru Kagaku no Rērugan).) is a Japanese manga series written by Kazuma Kamachi and illustrated by Motoi Fuyukawa, was serialized from the April 2007 issue to the May 2026 issue of ASCII Media Works' Dengeki Daioh magazine. The manga is a spin-off of Kamachi's A Certain Magical Index light novel series, taking place before and during the events of the main story. Seven Seas Entertainment began publishing the series in North America in June 2011. The series focuses on Mikoto Misaka and her friends—and the dangerous situations they find themselves in—as they get caught up in the matter of the Level Upper.

An anime television series adaptation by J.C.Staff aired in Japan between October 2009 and March 2010, followed by an original video animation released in October 2010. A second season titled A Certain Scientific Railgun S aired between April and September 2013. A spin-off manga series titled A Certain Scientific Railgun: Astral Buddy began serialization in Dengeki Daioh from April 2017 to July 2020. A third season titled A Certain Scientific Railgun T aired between January and September 2020. A fourth season has been announced.

== Premise ==
In the futuristic Academy City, which is made up of 80% students, many of whom are espers possessing unique psychic powers, Mikoto Misaka is an electromaster who is the third strongest of seven espers who have been given the rank of Level 5. The series focuses on the exploits of Mikoto and her friends Kuroko Shirai, Kazari Uiharu, and Ruiko Saten, prior to and during the events of A Certain Magical Index.

== Media ==
=== Manga ===
A Certain Scientific Railgun is illustrated by Motoi Fuyukawa and was serialized from the April 2007 issue to the May 2026 issue of ASCII Media Works' Dengeki Daioh. The first volume was released on November 10, 2007, and as of October 27, 2026, 21 volumes have been published. North American publisher Seven Seas Entertainment began distributing the Railgun manga from June 2011.

=== Anime ===
A 24-episode anime television series adaptation that was produced by J.C. Staff and directed by Tatsuyuki Nagai aired in Japan between October 3, 2009, and March 20, 2010. The anime was collected into eight DVD and Blu-ray Disc sets released between January 29 and August 27, 2010, with each volume containing a short story series titled A Certain Magical Index: Kanzaki SS. The series was licensed in North America by Funimation, who released the series on DVD on April 16, 2013. A bonus episode was included with a visual book released on July 24, 2010, and an original video animation (OVA) was released in Japan on October 29, 2010.

A 24-episode second season, also directed by Nagai, titled A Certain Scientific Railgun S, aired in Japan between April 12 and September 27, 2013. It was simulcast by Funimation, who released the series on DVD in North America in two parts on July 1, 2014, and August 19, 2014, respectively. Another bonus episode was released with a visual book released on March 27, 2014.

A third season titled A Certain Scientific Railgun T aired from January 10 to September 25, 2020. The third season ran for 25 episodes. Two bonus anime were released from the third season's first and fifth Blu-Ray/DVD volumes. Unlike previous seasons, the season was simulcasted on both Funimation and Crunchyroll, with Crunchyroll streaming the series in Japanese with English subtitles, and Funimation streaming the English dub. The three seasons, including the OVA, were released on Hulu in Japan on March 24, 2022.

A fourth season was announced during the "Dengeki Bunko Winter Festival 2025" livestream event on February 16, 2025.

==== Music ====
The anime adaptation of A Certain Scientific Railgun has five pieces of theme music, two opening themes and three ending themes. The first opening theme is "Only My Railgun" by fripSide, and the first ending theme is "Dear My Friend -Mada Minu Mirai e-" (Dear My Friend －まだ見ぬ未来へ－; lit. 'Dear My Friend (Toward a Future We Haven't Seen Yet)') by Elisa. The song "Smile (You & Me)" by Elisa, which uses the same tune as "Dear My Friend (Mada Minu Mirai e)", is featured as the ending theme for episode twelve. The second opening theme is "Level 5 Judgelight" by fripSide and the third ending theme is "Real Force" by Elisa. "Only My Railgun" appears in Konami's arcade music games Pop'n Music 20: Fantasia, Dance Dance Revolution X2 and Jubeat Knit. For the OVA, the opening theme music is "Future Gazer" by fripSide, the single of which was released on October 13, 2010, while the ending theme is "Special One" by Elisa, the single of which was released on October 27, 2010. The opening theme for the A Certain Scientific Railgun PSP game is "Way to answer" by fripSide.

For A Certain Scientific Railgun S, it has six pieces of theme music, two opening themes and four ending themes. The first opening theme is "Sister's Noise" by fripSide and the first ending theme is "Grow Slowly" by Yuka Iguchi, the latter of which was released on May 15, 2013. The song "stand still" by Iguchi is featured as the second ending theme for episodes 11 and 14. The second opening theme is "Eternal Reality" by fripSide and the third ending theme is "Links" by Sachika Misawa. The song "Infinia" by Misawa is featured as the fourth ending theme for episode 23.

For A Certain Scientific Railgun T, the first opening theme is "final phase" by fripSide and the first ending theme is "nameless story" by Kishida Kyoudan & The Akeboshi Rockets. The second opening theme is "dual existence" by fripSide, and the second ending theme is "Aoarashi no Ato de" (lit. 'After the summer storm') by Sajou no Hana.

=== Video games ===
A visual novel based on A Certain Scientific Railgun for the PSP was released on December 8, 2011, after facing several delays, and comes in a special edition which includes a Kuroko Shirai Figma figure. Fuji Shoji released a pachinko based on the series, titled A Certain Scientific Railgun P, on January 24, 2022.

=== Light novel ===
A light novel consisting of four stories about Mikoto, Kuroko, Kazari, and Ruiko was released in Japan on June 10, 2022. It is written by Kamachi and illustrated by Kiyotaka Haimura, Fuyukawa, Chuya Kogino, Arata Yamaji, Yasuhito Nogi, Teto Tachitsu, and Nankyoku Kisaragi.

== Reception ==
Four manga volumes distributed by Seven Seas Entertainment have been featured on The New York Times manga bestsellers list, with the most frequently listed (A Certain Scientific Railgun vol. 7) staying on the list for 4 weeks.

The opening theme music for the first season of A Certain Scientific Railgun, "Only My Railgun", won Best Theme Song at the 2010 Animation Kobe Awards. In September 2020, the anime series garnered over 300 million views in China through the Chinese streaming platform Bilibili.

Nicole MacLean of THEM Anime Reviews had mixed feelings on the first season of the series. Comparing the series to Aoi Hana, Bodacious Space Pirates, and Inari Kon Kon, she criticized the relationships between the characters but praised the narrative it added to the Index franchise.
