= List of A Certain Scientific Railgun albums =

This is a list of albums attributed to the Japanese animated and video game adaptations of A Certain Scientific Railgun manga series written by Kazuma Kamachi and illustrated by Motoi Fuyukawa.

== Singles ==
=== Anime ===
==== Opening theme ====
| Title | Release date | Peak chart positions | Anime |
| Title | Release date | Oricon | Anime |
|---|---|---|---|
| "Only My Railgun" | November 4, 2009 | 3 | A Certain Scientific Railgun |
| "Level 5 Judgelight" | February 17, 2010 | 4 | A Certain Scientific Railgun |
| "Future Gazer" | October 13, 2010 | 4 | A Certain Scientific Railgun OVA |
| "Sister's Noise" | May 8, 2013 | 1 | A Certain Scientific Railgun S |
| "Eternal Reality" | August 21, 2013 | 9 | A Certain Scientific Railgun S |
| "Final Phase" | February 26, 2020 | 10 | A Certain Scientific Railgun T |
| "Dual Existence" | August 19, 2020 | 11 | A Certain Scientific Railgun T |

==== Ending theme ====
| Title | Release date | Peak chart positions | Anime |
| Title | Release date | Oricon | Anime |
|---|---|---|---|
| "Dear My Friend Towards an Unseen Future" | November 4, 2009 | 22 | A Certain Scientific Railgun |
| "Real Force" | February 24, 2010 | 14 | A Certain Scientific Railgun |
| "Special One" | October 27, 2010 | 23 | A Certain Scientific Railgun OVA |
| "Grow Slowly" | May 15, 2013 | 10 | A Certain Scientific Railgun S |
| "Links" | August 21, 2013 | 20 | A Certain Scientific Railgun S |
| "Nameless Story" | January 29, 2020 | 42 | A Certain Scientific Railgun T |
| "After The Summer Storm" | August 19, 2020 | 41 | A Certain Scientific Railgun T |

=== Video game ===
| Title | Release date | Peak chart positions | Video game |
| Title | Release date | Oricon | Video game |
|---|---|---|---|
| Way to Answer | December 14, 2011 | 15 | A Certain Scientific Railgun (PSP) |

== Soundtracks ==
=== Spark!! (A Certain Scientific Railgun Official Soundtrack 1) ===
Spark!! (A Certain Scientific Railgun Official Soundtrack 1)

Soundtrack album by Maiko Iuchi
- Released: January 29, 2010
- Genre: J-pop
- Length: 45:57
- Language: Japanese
- Labels: Geneon Universal; Rondo Robe

Maiko Iuchi chronology
| Ar Tonelico Qoga 3 Hymmnos Concert (2010) | Spark!! (A Certain Scientific Railgun Official Soundtrack 1) (2010) | Shakkin Shimai Complete Soundtrack (2010) |

Spark!! (A Certain Scientific Railgun Original Soundtrack 1) is the first soundtrack for the first season of A Certain Scientific Railgun, which was released by Geneon Universal Entertainment on January 29, 2010.

==== Track listing ====
All music is composed by Maiko Iuchi, except where indicated.

Spark!! (A Certain Scientific Railgun Original Soundtrack 1) track listing
| No. | Title | Composer(s) | Length |
|---|---|---|---|
| 1. | "Only My Railgun (TV Size)" | Satoshi Yaginuma | 1:36 |
| 2. | "Tokiwadai Junior High" | | 2:26 |
| 3. | "Judgment's Activities" | | 1:44 |
| 4. | "This is Judgment!" | | 2:00 |
| 5. | "Kazari Uiharu" | | 1:57 |
| 6. | "School Garden" | | 1:42 |
| 7. | "Big Sister..." | | 1:11 |
| 8. | "Kuroko's Plan" | | 1:50 |
| 9. | "With the Usual Friend (from A Certain Magical Index soundtrack)" | | 1:38 |
| 10. | "Plot" | | 1:56 |
| 11. | "Searcher" | | 2:45 |
| 12. | "Battle Area" | | 2:28 |
| 13. | "Precious Friends" | | 1:58 |
| 14. | "Desire" | | 2:44 |
| 15. | "That Which is Rumored" | | 3:12 |
| 16. | "Anti-Skill" | | 1:38 |
| 17. | "Little Wish" | | 2:10 |
| 18. | "Railgun Shoot" | | 2:36 |
| 19. | "Turnabout (from A Certain Magical Index soundtrack)" | | 2:11 |
| 20. | "Bygone Promise" | | 2:11 |
| 21. | "Ms. Kiyama" | | 2:31 |
| 22. | "Dear My Friend -Towards an Unseen Future- (TV Size)" | Takuya Watanabe | 1:33 |
| Total length: | | | 45:57 |

=== Moment (A Certain Scientific Railgun Original Soundtrack 2) ===
Moment (A Certain Scientific Railgun Official Soundtrack 2)

Soundtrack album by Maiko Iuchi
- Released: May 28, 2010
- Studio: Studio Greenbird (Tokyo)
- Genre: J-pop
- Length: 54:06
- Language: Japanese
- Labels: Geneon Universal; Rondo Robe

Maiko Iuchi chronology
| Futa·Ane ~Bitter & Sweet~ Original Soundtrack (2010) | Moment (A Certain Scientific Railgun Official Soundtrack 2) (2010) | Rolling Star (2010) |

Moment (A Certain Scientific Railgun Original Soundtrack 2) is the second soundtrack for the first season of A Certain Scientific Railgun, which was released by Geneon Universal Entertainment on May 28, 2010.

==== Track listing ====
All music is composed by Maiko Iuchi, except where indicated.

Moment (A Certain Scientific Railgun Original Soundtrack 2) track listing
| No. | Title | Composer(s) | Length |
|---|---|---|---|
| 1. | "Level 5 -Judgelight- (TV Size)" | Satoshi Yaginuma | 1:42 |
| 2. | "After School" | | 2:17 |
| 3. | "Tokiwadai Dormitory" | | 1:36 |
| 4. | "Tea Time" | | 2:12 |
| 5. | "Oh Dear!" | | 1:36 |
| 6. | "This..." | | 1:57 |
| 7. | "Is it Really OK?" | | 1:59 |
| 8. | "Skill Out" | | 2:07 |
| 9. | "Memories" | | 2:11 |
| 10. | "Strong-minded" | | 3:54 |
| 11. | "High Speed" | | 3:20 |
| 12. | "Level Upper" | | 1:43 |
| 13. | "That Day Continued" | | 3:28 |
| 14. | "Hopeless Feelings" | | 2:18 |
| 15. | "Determination" | | 2:02 |
| 16. | "Reality to Confront" | | 3:17 |
| 17. | "AIM Burst" | | 1:47 |
| 18. | "Imminent Crisis (from A Certain Magical Index soundtrack)" | | 3:01 |
| 19. | "Unstoppable Reason" | | 1:50 |
| 20. | "Place to Return" | | 3:17 |
| 21. | "With a Smile" | | 2:10 |
| 22. | "Evening at Academy City" | | 2:50 |
| 23. | "Real Force (TV Size)" | Daisuke Kikura | 1:32 |
| Total length: | | | 54:06 |

=== A Certain Scientific Railgun S Original Soundtrack Vol. 1 ===
A Certain Scientific Railgun S Original Soundtrack Vol. 1

Soundtrack album by Maiko Iuchi
- Released: July 24, 2013
- Length: 38:19
- Language: Japanese
- Label: Warner Home Video

Maiko Iuchi chronology
| Sympathy (2013) | A Certain Scientific Railgun S Original Soundtrack Vol. 1 (2013) | A Certain Magical Index: The Movie – The Miracle of Endymion (2013) |

A Certain Scientific Railgun S Original Soundtrack Vol. 1 is the first soundtrack for A Certain Scientific Railgun S, which is bundled in the series' first limited-edition Blu-ray and DVD volumes that were released by Warner Home Video on July 24, 2013.

==== Track listing ====
All music is composed by Maiko Iuchi.

A Certain Scientific Railgun S Original Soundtrack Vol. 1 track listing
| No. | Title | Length |
|---|---|---|
| 1. | "Railguns Shoot" | 2:12 |
| 2. | "Cruel Reality" | 2:05 |
| 3. | "Esper" | 1:56 |
| 4. | "Absolute Ability Evolution Project" | 4:04 |
| 5. | "Accelerator" | 2:21 |
| 6. | "Search" | 2:05 |
| 7. | "Invader" | 2:11 |
| 8. | "Life Interrupt" | 2:47 |
| 9. | "Quiet Stratagem" | 2:15 |
| 10. | "The Usual 5 People" | 1:54 |
| 11. | "Old Feelings" | 2:00 |
| 12. | "Misaka's Sister" | 2:26 |
| 13. | "Gentle Feelings" | 2:02 |
| 14. | "Daily Kuroko" | 1:40 |
| 15. | "So, I Decided" | 2:03 |
| 16. | "Feeling for the First Time" | 1:41 |
| 17. | "Memories of Younger Days" | 2:37 |
| Total length: | | 38:19 |

=== A Certain Scientific Railgun S Original Soundtrack Vol. 2 ===
A Certain Scientific Railgun S Original Soundtrack Vol. 2

Soundtrack album by Maiko Iuchi
- Released: November 27, 2013
- Studio: Studio Mice (Osaka Prefecture)
- Length: 35:51
- Language: Japanese
- Label: Warner Home Video

Maiko Iuchi chronology
| Kimi ga Emu Yuugure (2013) | A Certain Scientific Railgun S Original Soundtrack Vol. 2 (2013) | Hi-Black (2013) |

A Certain Scientific Railgun S Original Soundtrack Vol. 2 is the second soundtrack for A Certain Scientific Railgun S, which is bundled in the series' fifth limited-edition Blu-ray and DVD volumes that were released by Warner Home Video on November 27, 2013.

==== Track listing ====
All music is composed by Maiko Iuchi.

A Certain Scientific Railgun S Original Soundtrack Vol. 2 track listing
| No. | Title | Length |
|---|---|---|
| 1. | "Weakest vs. Strongest" | 2:15 |
| 2. | "STUDY" | 1:51 |
| 3. | "Pressure" | 2:30 |
| 4. | "Number 3 vs. Number 4" | 2:08 |
| 5. | "Time Limit" | 2:14 |
| 6. | "ITEM" | 2:08 |
| 7. | "Meltdowner" | 1:49 |
| 8. | "The Strongest" | 1:57 |
| 9. | "System of the Darkness" | 2:36 |
| 10. | "Another Level 5" | 1:52 |
| 11. | "The Exceeding Despair" | 2:02 |
| 12. | "Frenda" | 2:20 |
| 13. | "Febrie" | 1:22 |
| 14. | "Mistakes Born Out of Purity" | 1:59 |
| 15. | "The Only Way" | 4:12 |
| 16. | "Determination and Resolution" | 2:36 |
| Total length: | | 35:51 |

=== A Certain Scientific Railgun T Original Soundtrack ===
A Certain Scientific Railgun T Original Soundtrack

Soundtrack album by Maiko Iuchi
- Released: October 9, 2020
- Length: 71:57
- Language: Japanese
- Label: Warner Bros. Home Entertainment

Maiko Iuchi chronology
| Acoustic For You. (2020) | A Certain Scientific Railgun T Original Soundtrack (2020) | Is the Order a Rabbit? Rearrange & Cover Album (2020) |

A Certain Scientific Railgun T Original Soundtrack is the soundtrack for A Certain Scientific Railgun T, which is bundled in the series' fifth limited-edition Blu-ray and DVD volumes that were released by Warner Bros. Home Entertainment on October 9, 2020.

==== Track listing ====
All music is composed by Maiko Iuchi.

A Certain Scientific Railgun T Original Soundtrack track listing
| No. | Title | Length |
|---|---|---|
| 1. | "Strawberry Fried Noodles" | 1:46 |
| 2. | "Let the Daihaseisai Commence!" | 2:03 |
| 3. | "Only My Undo-kai" | 1:56 |
| 4. | "These Two People on the 4th Course!" | 1:36 |
| 5. | "Tokiwadai's Gods of Wind and Thunder" | 2:25 |
| 6. | "My Smart Ability☆" | 1:23 |
| 7. | "Leave it to Mitsuko Kōngo!" | 1:52 |
| 8. | "Girls at Full Power!" | 2:15 |
| 9. | "Exterior" | 2:03 |
| 10. | "Psychological Control" | 2:44 |
| 11. | "Balloon Hunter" | 2:19 |
| 12. | "Factions and Plots" | 3:30 |
| 13. | "Limiter Release Code" | 2:33 |
| 14. | "Memory Manipulation" | 2:20 |
| 15. | "SCHOOL" | 1:47 |
| 16. | "I Cannot Hold My Anger Any Longer" | 2:34 |
| 17. | "Why is Mikoto Misaka Here?!" | 1:56 |
| 18. | "Memories of Dolly and Mi-chan" | 2:44 |
| 19. | "Experimental Lab Rats" | 2:56 |
| 20. | "Now, Let the Experiment Begin!" | 2:39 |
| 21. | "Steps to Evolution" | 3:08 |
| 22. | "Versatility Ability" | 2:39 |
| 23. | "Scientific Development and Sacrifice" | 3:06 |
| 24. | "Those Who are Not Deities" | 2:20 |
| 25. | "Girly Things" | 2:38 |
| 26. | "Hyper Amazing Punch!" | 2:29 |
| 27. | "Days of Childhood" | 2:18 |
| 28. | "Dream Ranker" | 1:52 |
| 29. | "Little by Little" | 3:06 |
| 30. | "Railgun T's theme" | 3:00 |
| Total length: | | 71:57 |
