= FripSide =

Japanese pop and trance duo

fripSide
- Official logo

Background information
- Origin: Japan
- Genres: Trance; synthpop; dance-rock
- Years active: 2002–present
- Labels: elseena-music entertainment (2006–2008); Visual Arts (2008–2009); MAGES. (2008); Pony Canyon Inc. (2008); NBCUniversal Entertainment Japan (2009–present); Avex Pictures Inc. (2016); Republic Records (2022–present)
- Members: Satoshi Yaginuma; Mao Uesugi; Hisayo Abe
- Past members: Nao (2002–2009); Yoshino Nanjō (2009–2022)
- Website: www.fripside.net

Fripside (stylized as fripSide) is a Japanese pop/trance duo originally formed by composer Satoshi Yaginuma (Sat) and singer Nao in February 2002.

== History ==
In a 2008 interview, Satoshi said that he was a fan of TM Network and its member Tetsuya Komuro in his elementary and junior high school days and began to produce his music at the age of 14.

When the group started, they were releasing their songs on the Japanese amateur and indie community, Muzie. fripSide's albums were always high in sales at Muzie's online CD shop. As of July 2006, more than 6,000 copies of the three original albums have been sold.

They officially became a part of Visual Arts in 2006. They released their works under elseena-music entertainment and many of their songs were created for Visual Arts' games, as well as other erotic game companies. In addition, fripSide had a side group, called "fripSide NAO Project" which started on March 30, 2007. fripSide NAO Project released songs different from the usual style of fripSide, and did not follow fripSide's motto of "creating songs that everyone can relate to". One album and one single were released under fripSide NAO project.

On March 15, 2009, Nao stated on the fripSide Official Website that she had graduated from fripSide. Sat and Nao want to pursue different musical careers, as Nao intends to pursue a solo singing career. Meanwhile, Sat will continue in fripSide with a new project called, fripside: THE NEXT PROJECT.

Voice actress Yoshino Nanjō replaced Nao as the new lead singer of fripSide. They re-debuted under the record label Geneon Universal Entertainment with single "Only My Railgun", the opening theme to the anime series A Certain Scientific Railgun, on November 4, 2009. The single debuted at the number-three position on the Japanese Oricon weekly single charts with the first week sales of about 26,000 copies, which was higher than the position of single "Flower of Bravery" (No. 26) in 2008. On May 8, 2013, fripSide release their 6th single, "Sister's Noise" which was used as the first opening theme for A Certain Scientific Railgun S and was their first-ever to reach #1 spot single in the weekly charts, #9 on the monthly charts, with 42,632 units sold for May beating Uta-Pri Maji Love 2000% Idol Song Singles.

On August 21, 2013, fripSide released their 7th single, "Eternal Reality" which was used as the second opening theme for A Certain Scientific Railgun S. The single was made in collaboration with Tetsuya Komuro for its composition and arrangement and was released into 3 editions, the Regular (CD only), Limited (CD+DVD edition) and Anime editions.

During the fripSide Announcement Special livestream on October 31, 2021, Nanjō announced her retirement from fripSide. She still performed with Yaginuma in a virtual concert on January 8, 2022, and will join him again at a concert tour in April.

On April 24, 2022, the fripSide Phase 2 Final Arena Tour ended with the announcement of Phase 3's two new singers, Mao Uesugi and Hisayo Abe. Phase 2 singer, Yoshino Nanjo, performed "infinite synthesis" then was joined by Phase 3's singers during the song. The emcee then introduced the duo before they performed their debut song "dawn of infinity", which premiered as the opening theme to the anime series The Dawn of the Witch on April 8. The single was released on May 18.

== Members ==
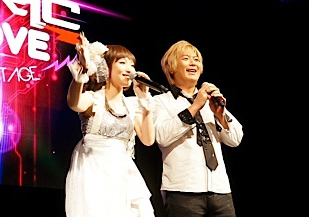
Fripside at Anime Festival Asia 2012. from left to right : Yoshino Nanjō, Satoshi Yaginuma.

=== Main members ===
- Satoshi Yaginuma (nickname "Sat") (composer, arrangement, vocals, lyrics, synthesizer, guitar, programming)
- Mao Uesugi (vocals, lyrics) – announced as one of the two lead singers of fripSide on April 24, 2022.
- Hisayo Abe (vocals, lyrics) – announced as one of the two lead singers of fripSide on April 24, 2022.

=== Former members ===
- Nao (vocals, lyrics) – graduated on March 15, 2009
- Yoshino Nanjō (nickname "Nanjolno") (vocals, lyrics) – announced as the new lead singer of fripSide on July 28, 2009. Graduated on April 24, 2022.

=== Sound staff ===
- Kenji (sound director)
- Takumi Okamoto (sound director)
- masa (chorus, synthesizer)
- Mayu (guitar)
- Takahiro Toguchida (guitar)
- a2c (guitar)
- Shinichiro Yamashita (lyrics)
- Graphica3810 (design)
- Kula (management)
- riko (chorus)
- Kai Kawasaki (nickname: "DJ Hentai") (arranger, DJ, synthesizer)
- shin kurokawa (lyrics, composition)
- Shinya Saito (arranger)
- Hoshino takeshi (guitar)
- Yagi kazumi (drum)
- Kitamura Yuta (bass guitar)

== Discography ==
=== fripSide (Nao) ===
==== Singles ====
	Release date	Title	Tracklist	Charts
1st	July 16, 2008	Flower of Bravery	1. Flower Of Bravery (Koihime Musō opening theme); 2. Sky – version 2008; 3. Flower Of Bravery （off vocal）; 4. Sky – version 2008 （instrumental）	Japanese Oricon weekly single charts #26

==== Original albums ====
	Release date	Title	Tracklist
1st	April 12, 2003	First Odyssey of fripSide	1. Introduction; 2. Distant Moon; 3. Come to Mind; 4. Love to Sing; 5. Colorless Fate; 6. Your Ocean (Azure Reproduct mix); 7. Be Sure... (album mix); 8. Bright Days<; 9. In the Future – side 2; 10. Love to Sing (Hevens Wire rmx); 11. End Game
2nd	March 28, 2004	2nd Fragment of fripSide	1. Second Fragment; 2. Sky; 3. Transitory Orbit; 4. Message; 5. Save Me Again; 6. Tearful Voice; 7. Belief; 8. Stellar; 9. Detour – fripSide edition 10. Crying Moon; 11. Belief (Tri-Hedge rmx); 12. Storm of Sorrow
3rd	June 23, 2005	3rd Reflection of fripSide	1. An Evening Calm; 2. Reminiscense Blue; 3. Nostalgia; 4. Transient Wind; 5. Vanity Destroyer – fripSide edition 6. Velocity – fripSide+vin-PRAD; 7. Splash Emotion; 8. Colors of Summer Dream; 9. Planet Illusion; 10. Sky (slab reproduct mix); 11. Bright Days – version 2005; 12. Distant Moon – version 2005
4th	August 24, 2007	Binarydigit	1. Binary Digit; 2. Hurting Heart (Shinkyoku Sōkai Polyphonica THE BLACK opening theme); 3. Misery (Kanojotachi no Ryuugiimage song); 4. Prominence – version 2007; 5. Refine Progress (Scramble Heart opening theme); 6. Heat Your Wave; 7. Libration Crisis (Scramble Heart opening theme); 8. Never No Astray (Katakoi no Tsuki ending theme); 9. Transient Wind – version 2007; 10. Dream Myself! (Keitai Keiji ~Ozemichi Sakurako no Jiken-bo Midori no Megane Satsujin Jiken~Drama CD theme song); 11. True Eternity – album version 12. Brave New World (Planetarian Drama CD insert song)
4th	August 24, 2007	Binarydigit	Bonus disc(初回盤のみ付属): 1. Hurting Heart – Nao piano arrange 2. Feeling Trust
5th	ソフトウェア流通盤; September 16, 2008	Split Tears	1. Before Dawn Daybreak (Before Dawn Daybreak ~Shinen no Utahime~ theme song); 2. Split Tears (Katakoi no Tsuki insert song); 3. Praying Over (album version); 4. Magicaride (Magica Ride insert song); 5. Fictional Moon (album version); 6. Snow Blind (album version); 7. Snow Blind – after 8. Spiral of Despair; 9. Escape –version 2008; 10. Tomorrow (Katakoi no Tsuki ending theme); 11. Eternal Twinkle (Twinkle Crusaders ending theme)
5th	メジャー流通盤; September 17, 2008	Split Tears	1. Before Dawn Daybreak (Before Dawn Daybreak ~Shinen no Utahime~ theme song); 2. Split Tears (Katakoi no Tsuki insert song); 3. Praying Over (album version); 4. Magicaride (Magica Ride insert song); 5. Fictional Moon (album version); 6. Snow Blind (album version); 7. Snow Blind – after 8. Spiral of Despair; 9. Escape –version 2008; 10. Tomorrow (Katakoi no Tsuki ending theme); 11. Eternal Twinkle (Twinkle Crusaders ending theme)

==== Other albums ====
	Release date	Title	Tracklist
Best	July 15, 2006	The Very Best Of fripSide 2002–2006 （Coterie board）	Disc1 Nao Side: 1. Come To Mind; 2. Sky; 3. An Evening Calm; 4. Save Me Again; 5. Nostalgia （Computer game ending theme 'Reminiscence Blue'）; 6. Transitory Orbit; 7. Colorless Fate; 8. Crescendo; 9. Velocity – fripSide+vin-PRAD; 10. Bright Days – version 2005; 11. Splash Emotion; 12. End Game; 13. Crying Moon; 14. Distant Moon
Best	July 15, 2006	The Very Best Of fripSide 2002–2006 （Coterie board）	Disc2 sat Side: 1. The Chaostic World; 2. Vanity Destroyer; 3. Message; 4. Reminiscence Blue （Computer game opening theme 'Reminiscence Blue'）; 5. Melody – reset+fripSide; 6. Love To Sing; 7. Stellar; 8. Transient Wind （Computer game theme song 'Four-leaf'）; 9. Absolute One; 10. Colors Of Summer Dream; 11. Planet Illusion; 12. Be Sure... – album mix 13. Belief; 14. Your Ocean – azure reproduct mix
Best	December 29, 2006	The Very Best Of fripSide 2002-2006 （commercial distribution board）	Disc1 Nao Side: 1. Red – reduction division (Kanojotachi no Ryuugi opening theme); 2. Sky; 3. An Evening Calm; 4. Save Me Again; 5. Nostalgia; 6. Transitory Orbit; 7. Colorless Fate; 8. Crescendo; 9. Velocity – fripSide+vin-PRAD; 10. Bright Days – version 2005; 11. Splash Emotion; 12. Come To Mind; 13. Crying Moon; 14. Distant Moon
Best	December 29, 2006	The Very Best Of fripSide 2002-2006 （commercial distribution board）	Disc 2 sat Side: 1. The Chaostic World; 2. Vanity Destroyer; 3. Message; 4. Reminiscence Blue; 5. Melody – reset+fripSide; 6. True Eternity (Kanojotachi no Ryuugi ending theme); 7. Stellar; 8. Transient Wind; 9. Absolute One; 10. Love To Sing; 11. Planet Illusion; 12. Belief; 13. Your Ocean –azure reproduct mix 14. Red –reduction division (tkm vs sat rmx)
Remix	December 28, 2008	Re:product mixes ver.0.1（Comic Market 75 Limited）	1. Hurting Heart (Jju-Ri-mix); 2. Red – reduction division (sat vs tkm rmx ver.2.1); 3. Magicaride (Kai Re:Product rmx); 4. Vanity Destroyer (Tkm Re:Product rmx); 5. Spiral Of Despair (Tkm Re:product rmx); 6. An Evening Calm (Kai Re:product rmx); 7. Red –reduction division (sat vs tkm rmx)
CD-box	First edition Limited edition 2009; July 17, 2009	Nao Complete Anthology 2002-2009 – My Graduation	* 105 songs
CD-box	Edition; Comic market 77 pre-sale December 29, 2009	Nao Complete Anthology 2002-2009 – My Graduation	* 105 songs
CD-box	Edition; General sale March 26, 2010	Nao Complete Anthology 2002-2009 – My Graduation	* 105 songs

==== fripSide NAO project! ====
===== Singles =====
	Release date	Title	Tracklist	Oricon
1st	August 20, 2008	Yappari sekaiha atashi☆legend!!	1. Yappari sekaiha atashi☆legend!! (Koihime Musō anime ending theme); 2. Pool • Vacation; 3. Yappari sekaiha atashi☆legend!! (Off Vocal); 4. Pool • Vacation (Off Vocal)	Japanese Oricon weekly single charts #32

===== Original album =====
	Release date	Title	Tracklist
1st	January 25, 2008	Rabbit Syndrome	1. Assenburu Love Sannburu (Ane wa Erokomi Henshuusha – Injuu Bukkake Seishidou) theme song）; 2. Sena★Sena@Surprise!! （(Sena★Sena theme song); 3. Rabbit Syndrome; 4. Konniro∞tokimeki!! – Kigasetara Nugasanai~ (Imouto ni! Sukumizu Kisetara Nugasanai! theme song); 5. Kagayake! dreamin'gir' 6. Koibito☆Accent!! (Koibito Doushi de Suru Koto Zenbu theme song); 7. Wireless Cosmic （Web Radio theme song self cover 'Radio ティンクル☆くるせいだーす'）; 8. Reversible Romance; 9. Happy Generation (Moe Dora CD School Heart's Drama CD theme song); 10. Sena★Sena@Surprise!! – 生物rmx 11. Assenburu☆LOVE sannburu – R.S.PV rmx

=== fripSide (Yoshino) ===
==== Singles ====
	Release date	Title	Track listing	Charts
1st	November 4, 2009	only my railgun	1. Only My Railgun (Toaru Kagaku no Railgun anime opening theme); 2. Late In Autumn; 3. Only My Railgun (Instrumental); 4. Late In Autumn (instrumental)	Japanese Oricon weekly single charts #3
2nd	February 17, 2010	Level 5: Judgelight	1. Level 5 Judgelight (Toaru Kagaku no Railgun anime second opening theme); 2. Memory of Snow; 3. Level 5 Judgelight (instrumental) 4.memory of snow (instrumental)	Japanese Oricon weekly single charts #4
3rd	October 13, 2010	Future Gazer	1. Future Gazer (Toaru Kagaku no Railgun OVA opening theme); 2. Fortissimo – The Ultimate Crisis (Fortissimo Akkord:Bsusvier theme song); 3. Future Gazer (instrumental); 4. Fortissimo – The Ultimate Crisis (instrumental)	Japanese Oricon weekly single charts #4
4th	August 24, 2011	Heaven is a Place on Earth	1. Heaven is a Place on Earth (Hayate no Gotoku! movie opening theme); 2. The end of Summer; 3. Heaven is a Place on Earth (instrumental); 4. The end of Summer (instrumental)	Japanese Oricon weekly single charts #19
5th	December 14, 2011	Way to Answer	1. Way to Answer (Toaru Kagaku no Railgun PSP game opening theme); 2. Last Fortune (Twinkle Crusaders – Passion Star Stream PC game opening theme); 3. Way to Answer (instrumental); 4. Last Fortune (instrumental)	Japanese Oricon weekly single charts #15
6th	May 8, 2013	Sister's Noise	1. Sister's Noise (opening theme for Toaru Kagaku no Railgun S); 2. I'm Believing You; 3. Sister's Noise (instrumental); 4. I'm Believing You(instrumental)	Japanese Oricon weekly single charts #1
7th	August 21, 2013	eternal reality	1. Eternal Reality (2nd opening theme for Toaru Kagaku no Railgun S); 2A. Scorching Heart (B-side track for the regular and limited editions); 2B. Waiting for the Moment (B-side track for the anime edition); 3A. Eternal Reality (instrumental) (regular and limited editions only); 3B. Eternal Reality (TV Size) (anime edition only); 4A. Scorching Heart(instrumental) (regular and limited editions only); 4B. Eternal Reality (instrumental) (anime edition only)	Japanese Oricon weekly single charts #9
8th	May 14, 2014	black bullet	1. black bullet (Black Bullet opening theme); 2. Pico Scope – SACLA ( mirai koshi: harima SACLA theme song); 3. Black Bullet (instrumental); 4. Pico Scope – SACLA (instrumental)	Japanese Oricon weekly single charts #6
9th	May 20, 2015	Luminize	1. Luminize (future card buddyfight 100 opening theme); 2. Unlimited Destiny (hyper galaxy fleet opening theme); 3. Luminize (instrumental); 4. Unlimited Destiny (instrumental)	Japanese Oricon weekly single charts #11
10th	December 2, 2015	Two Souls – Toward The Truth	1. Two Souls – Toward The Truth ( Seraph of the End : Battle for Nagoya opening theme); 2. Fuyu no Kakera; 3. Two Souls – Toward The Truth (instrumental); 4. Fuyu no Kakera (instrumental)	Japanese Oricon weekly single charts #12
11th	February 10, 2016	White Forces	1. White Forces (Schwarzesmarken Anime Opening Theme); 2. 1983 – Schwarzesmarken (PC Game : Schwarzesmarken OP Theme); 3. White Forces (instrumental); 4. 1983 – Schwarzesmarken (instrumental)	Japanese Oricon weekly single charts #7
12th	May 3, 2017	clockwork planet	1. clockwork planet (Clockwork Planet opening theme); 2. Break Our Limit; 3. clockwork planet (instrumental); 4. Break Our Limit (instrumental)	Japanese Oricon weekly single charts #9
13th	February 28, 2018	killing bites	1. killing bites (Killing Bites opening theme); 2. three count 3. killing bites (instrumental); 4. three count (instrumental)	Japanese Oricon weekly single charts #16
14th	May 16th, 2018	divine criminal	1. divine criminal (Dances with the Dragons opening theme); 2. I believe in my heart 3. brave new world -crossroads version- (fripSide only); 4. divine criminal (instrumental); 5. I believe in my heart (instrumental); 6. brave new world -crossroads version- (fripSide only) (instrumental)	Japanese Oricon weekly single charts #11
15th	November 7th, 2018	Love with You	1. Love with You (Boarding School Juliet opening theme); 2. Blue Moon; 3. Love with You (instrumental); 4. Blue Moon (instrumental)	Japanese Oricon weekly single charts #12
16th	February 26th, 2020	final phase	1. final phase (Toaru Kagaku no Railgun T opening theme); 2. promenade 3. final phase (instrumental); 4. promenade (instrumental)	Japanese Oricon weekly singles charts #10
17th	August 19th, 2020	dual existence	1. dual existence (Toaru Kagaku no Railgun T second opening theme); 2. Reason to be here 3. dual existence (instrumental); 4. Reason to be here (instrumental)	Japanese Oricon weekly singles charts #11
18th	November 4th, 2020	legendary future	1. legendary future (King's Raid: Successors of the Will opening theme); 2. a new day will come 3. legendary future (instrumental); 4. a new day will come (instrumental)	Japanese Oricon weekly single charts #12
19th	February 2, 2022	Leap of faith	1. Leap of faith (The Strongest Sage With the Weakest Crest opening theme); 2. passage 3. Leap of faith (instrumental); 4. passage (instrumental)	Japanese Oricon weekly single charts #9

==== Albums ====
	Release date	Title	Songs
1st	December 1, 2010	infinite synthesis	1. Only My Railgun (To Aru Kagaku no Railgun anime opening theme); 2. Level 5 – Judgelight (To Aru Kagaku no Railgun anime second opening theme); 3. Everlasting (Aa! Megami-sama! volume 42's limited edition theme song); 4. Late In Autumn; 5. Future Gazer (To Aru Kagaku no Railgun OVA opening theme); 6. Kanashii Seiza; 7. Crossing Over; 8. Closest Love (Areas ~Koi Suru Otome no 3H~ opening and ending theme); 9. Meditations; 10. Trusty Snow; 11. Lost Answer; 12. Eternal Pain; 13. Stay with You
2nd	January 1, 2012	fripSide PC game compilation vol. 01	1. Hidamari Basket (eufonie’s Hidamari Basket opening theme song); 2. Trust in You (Lillian’s RADIO Twinkle Crusaders vol. 3); 3. Aliss in Losso (Ningyou Yuugisha’s Aliss Muppet theme song); 4. Colorless Fate – ver. Luna 2011 (manatsu_8′s Ima mo Itsuka mo Faluna Luna image song); 5. Triptych – fripSide arrange version (from ALcot’s vocal arrange album growing); 6. Spiral of Despair – Resurrection (Frill’s Chikan Senyou Sharyou 2 theme song); 7. Miracle Luminous (Riffraff’s Ren’ai Katei Kyoushi Rurumi★Coordinate! theme song); 8. Star Carnival (Twinkle☆Crusaders GoGo! STARLIT BRAVE theme song); 9. Prismatic Fate (Pajamasoft’s Prism☆Magical ending theme); 10. Prism (Eufonie’s Hidamari Basket ending theme song); 11. Whisper of Winter (album exclusive)
3rd	December 5, 2012	Decade	1. Decade; 2. Way to Answer (To aru Kagaku no Railgun PSP game opening theme); 3. Fortissimo – The Ultimate Crisis (Fortissimo//Akkord:Bsusvier theme song); 4. Come to Mind – ver. 3; 5. Heaven is a Place on Earth (Hayate no Gotoku! movie opening theme); 6. Fortissimo – From Insanity Affection (Fortissimo EXS//Akkord:nächsten Phase theme song); 7. Grievous Distance; 8. Whitebird; 9. A Silent Voice; 10. Message – ver. 2; 11. Re:ceptivity; 12. Infinite Orbit (Galaxy Dungeon theme song); 13. Endless Memory – Refrain as Da Capo (D.C.III R ~ Da Capo III ~ Earl theme song)
4th	September 10, 2014	infinite synthesis 2	1. Sister's Noise (To aru Kagaku no Railgun S anime opening theme); 2. Infinite Synthesis; 3. Fermata~Akkord:fortissimo~ (Kadenz fermata//Akkord:fortissimo PSV game theme song); 4. Lost Dimension (Lost Dimension PS3/PS Vita game main theme); 5. I'm Believing You; 6. Secret Of My Heart; 7. Eternal Reality (To aru Kagaku no Railgun S anime 2nd opening theme); 8. Black Bullet (Black Bullet anime opening theme); 9. Rain Of Tears; 10. Scorching Heart; 11. Waiting For The Moment; 12. Always Be With You; 13. True Resonance
5th	August 26, 2015	fripSide PC game compilation vol. 02	1. Hesitation Snow (Saga Planets' Hatsuyuki Sakura theme song); 2. Before Dawn Daybreak – version 2015; 3. Sword Of Virgin (Eufonie’s Koiken Otome opening theme song); 4. Fortuna On The Sixteenth Night (Lapis Lazuli's Izayoi no Fortuna opening theme song); 5. Glow In The Darkness (Studio Rokucha's Minamijuusei Renka: Southern Cross Love Song theme song); 6. Blaze Of Reunion (eufonie’s Koiken Otome ~Revive~ opening theme song); 7. Keep Your Promise (Regulus' 1/7 no Mahotsukai opening theme song); 8. Absolute Wish (mirai's Hanahime Absolute theme song); 9. Precious Time; 10. Join Forces (Regulus' 1/7 no Mahotsukai ending theme song); 11. With The Light (Lapis Lazuli's Izayoi no Fortuna ending theme song); 12. Passion Fruits (album exclusive)
6th	October 5, 2016	infinite synthesis 3	1. 2016 – Third Cosmic Velocity; 2. Luminize; 3. 1983 – Schwarzesmarken (IS3 version); 4. Determination; 5. Magicaride – version 2016; 6. Answer; 7. Two Souls – Toward The Truth; 8. White Forces – IS3 edition 9. Crescendo – version 2016; 10. Run Into The Light; 11. Dry Your Tears; 12. Unlimited Destiny; 13. One And Only; 14. Side By Side
7th	October 4, 2017	crossroads	Disc 1: 1. sky -crossroads version-; 2. Red "reduction division" -crossroads version-; 3. hurting heart -crossroads version-; 4. an evening calm -crossroads version-; 5. split tears -crossroads version-; 6. the chaostic world -crossroads version-; 7. prominence -crossroads version-; 8. distant moon -crossroads version-; 9. escape -crossroads version-; 10. before dawn daybreak -crossroads version-; 11. snow blind -crossroads version-; 12. brave new world -crossroads version-
7th	October 4, 2017	crossroads	Disc 2: 1. clockwork planet 2. The end of escape -fripSide edition-; 3. crossroads 4. a gleam of prologue 5. pico scope -SACLA-; 6. only me and the moon
8th	October 10, 2018	infinite synthesis 4	1. Edge of the Universe; 2. Killing Bites; 3. Divine Criminal; 4. Snow of Silence; 5. White Relation (IS4 version); 6. Colorless Fate - version 2018; 7. Under a Starlit Sky; 8. Breaking Dawn; 9. One Dream; 10. Adverse Wind; 11. Beyond the Horizon; 12. You Only Live Once; 13. Close to You; 14. Like a Blink, a Short Night.
9th	October 30, 2019	infinite synthesis 5	1. When Chance Strikes; 2. Love With You; 3. Perpetual Wishes; 4. Rain of Blossoms; 5. Lighting of my Heart; 6. As Before; 7. Light at the End; 8. Frosty Breeze; 9. Change Your Core Self; 10. Brand New World; 11. Endless Entropy; 12. Glorious Wind; 13. Believe in Your Future
10th	March 23, 2022	infinite synthesis 6	1. stay with you -ver.2022-; 2. Leap of faith 3. endless voyage 4. legendary future 5. Your breeze 6. for Seasons; 7. worlds collide (To Aru Majutsu no Index: Imaginary Fest second theme song); 8. The wind in your heart 9. faraway sky 10. With falling snow 11. preparedness star 12. on this night 13. regret 14. Dear All

==== Collaboration Singles ====
1. 僕は僕であって (Boku wa Boku de Atte) [as angela x fripSide]
  - Release date : 19 October 2016
  1. 僕は僕であって (Boku wa Boku de Atte)
  2. 僕は僕であって (TV size)
  3. 僕は僕であって (off vocal version)
2. The end of escape [as fripSide x angela]
  - Release date: 7 December 2016

=== fripSide (Mao & Hisayo) ===
==== Singles ====
	Release date	Title	Track listing	Charts
1st	May 18, 2022	dawn of infinity	1. dawn of infinity (The Dawn of the Witch anime opening theme); 2. Regeneration; 3. dawn of infinity (instrumental); 4. Regeneration (instrumental)	Japanese Oricon weekly single charts #18
2nd	October 11, 2023	Red Liberation	1. Red Liberation (The Vexations of a Shut-In Vampire Princess anime opening theme); 2. more than you know 3. Red Liberation (instrumental); 4. more than you know (instrumental)	Japanese Oricon weekly single charts #35
3rd	August 21, 2024	Secret Operation	1. Secret Operation (Mission: Yozakura Family anime opening theme 2); 2. Secret Operation - fripSide Edition; 3. Secret Operation - Yoshino Nanjo Edition; 4. Secret Operation (instrumental)	Japanese Oricon weekly single charts #26

==== Albums ====
	Release date	Title	Track listing	Charts
1st	October 19, 2022	double Decades	1. double Decades (vocal：nao（Phase1 vo.）, Yoshino Nanjo（Phase2 vo.）, Mao, Hisayo（Phase3 vo.）); 2. magicaride -version 2022-; 3. BLACKFOX -version 2022-; 4. trusty snow -version 2022-; 5. fermata～Akkord:fortissimo～-version 2022-; 6. transitory orbit -version 2022-（vocal：Mao); 7. LEVEL5-judgelight- -version 2022-; 8. come to mind -version 2022-; 9. crescendo -version 2022-; 10. sister’s noise -version 2022-; 11. before dawn daybreak -version 2022-（vocal：Hisayo）	Japanese Oricon weekly album charts #12
1st	October 19, 2022	infinite Resonance	1. infinite Resonance; 2. dawn of infinity (The Dawn of the Witch anime opening theme); 3. Flames (vocal：Hisayo); 4. Insoluble snow 5. trust in you -version 2022-; 6. with a smile（vocal：Hisayo); 7. Your Way; 8. Distance（vocal：Mao); 9. Reach for the light（vocal：Mao); 10. Forget-me-not; 11. an Effect of Fate; 12. New World; 13. Shape of Delight	Japanese Oricon weekly album charts #12
2nd	November 8, 2023	infinite Resonance 2	1. Invisible Wings; 2. Red Liberation (The Vexations of a Shut-In Vampire Princess anime opening theme); 3. final phase (version 2023); 4. Freezing rain 5. save me again (version 2023); 6. The Light of Darkness; 7. black bullet (version 2023); 8. Two souls -toward the truth- (version 2023); 9. Trust in my soul 10. dual existence (version 2023); 11. Distance to starry sky 12. Newage; 13. You	Japanese Oricon weekly album charts #19
3rd	October 9, 2024	infinite Resonance 3	1. Starlit Moment; 2. Unbroken Resolve; 3. Solitude in Autumn; 4. Winterfade; 5. Gratitude to You (vocal: Hisayo); 6. Secret Operation -fripSide Edition-; 7. Twinkle Star Nights; 8. killing bites (version 2024); 9. Salvation (vocal: Mao); 10. Turn Night Into Day; 11. Against the World; 12. Hesitation Snow (version 2024); 13. future gazer (version 2024)	Japanese Oricon weekly album charts #15

=== Video games ===
Release date	Title	Single
December 29, 2007	ALcot Vocal Arrange Album Growing	1. Triptych – fripSide arrange version 2. Tsuki To Yume – fripSide arrange version
February 27, 2009	RADiO Twinkle☆Crusaders vol.3	1. Trust In You; 2. Trust In You (instrumental)
December 11, 2009	Hidamari Basket Vocal Collection	1. Hidamari Basket （Hidamari Basket Opening Theme）; 2. Prism （Hidamari Basket Ending Theme）; 3. Hidamari Basket （instrumental）; 4. Prism （instrumental）
March 26, 2010	Areas～Koi Suru Otome no 3H～ Theme Song CD'	1. Closest Love (Areas ~Koi Suru Otome no 3H~ theme song); 2. Closest Love （karaoke ver.）; 3. Closest Love （instrumental）; 4. Closest Love （short ver.
July 7, 2010	Dance Dance Revolution X2; Jubeat Knit (July 29, 2010); Pop'n Music 19 (December 9, 2010); Gitadora (February 14, 2013); Sound Voltex Vivid Wave (February 28, 2019)	"only my railgun" (also present in subsequent games); Pop'n Music, Gitadora and the 2021 jubeat feature a cover version.; Removed from Dance Dance Revolution A in the April 2021 build; Removed from Dance Dance Revolution A20 Plus on June 28, 2021
August 27, 2010	Prism☆Magical ~PRISM Generations!~ Magical☆Vocal Collection'	Prismatic Fate （Prism☆Magical 2nd Opening Theme）
August 26, 2011	"Ren’ai Katei Kyoushi Rurumi★Coordinate!" Original Soundtrack	Miracle Luminous (Ren’ai Katei Kyoushi Rurumi★Coordinate! Opening Theme)
November 16, 2011	Dance Dance Revolution X3 vs. 2ndMix; Reflec Beat Limelight	"Future gazer" (also present in subsequent games until 2016); Exclusive to Asia; unavailable in North America and Europe; Removed from Reflec Beat Volzza 2 on October 3, 2016; Removed from Dance Dance Revolution A on November 7, 2016
February 24, 2012	Hatsuyuki Sakura Special Soundtrack	1. Hesitation Snow (Hatsuyuki Sakura Opening Theme); 2. Hesitation Snow (instrumental)
May 25, 2012	Hatsuyuki Sakura Complete Soundtrack	Hesitation Snow (Hatsuyuki Sakura Opening Theme)
December 24, 2012	Koiken Otome Vocal Collection	1. Sword of Virgin (Koiken Otome Opening Theme); 2. Happy Go Round (Koiken Otome Ending Theme); 3. Sword of Virgin (instrumental); 4. Happy Go Round (instrumental)
November 29, 2013	Izayoi no Fortuna Original Soundtrack CD	Fortuna on the Sixteenth Night (Izayoi no Fortuna Opening Theme); With the Light (Izayoi no Fortuna Ending Theme); Fortuna on the Sixteenth Night (instrumental); With the Light (instrumental)
March 28, 2014	Clover Heart's -Reproduct mix-	1. Clover Heart's – Re:product mix full chorus ver.; 2. Clover Heart's – Re:product mix half chorus ver.; 3. Clover Heart's – Re:product mix off chorus ver.
April 25, 2014	Koiken Otome ~Revive~ Original Soundtrack	Blaze of Reunion (Koiken Otome ~Revive~ Opening Theme); Blaze of Reunion -instrumental-

=== Contributions ===
- magic "a" ride Vocal CD (Opening theme for magic "a" ride) - Released on July 4, 2008. This vocal CD was only a bonus disc for those who pre-ordered the game. Only the first track is done by fripSide.
- Katakoi no Tsuki First Edition Special Vocal Collection – Tracks 2–4 were done by fripSide (Split Tears, Tomorrow, and Never no Astray).
- spiral of despair – resurrection – (Opening for Chikan Senyou Sharyou 2 – Houfiku no Chijyoku Densha) – Under the name fripSide featuring Rita. This song was made after Nao left.
- brave new world (insert song from the Key/Visual Arts drama CD adaptation of Planetarian) was done by fripSide.
- Ryuusei no Bifrost (opening theme of the first Hyperdimension Neptunia game) was done by Nao in 2011, after she graduated.
- re:ceptivity (featured in Decade Album) is vocalized by Nao.
