= Only My Railgun =

Single by fripSide
- Language: Japanese
- B-side: "Late in Autumn"
- Released: November 4, 2009
- Genre: Electronic; J-pop
- Length: 20:48
- Label: Geneon Universal
- Composer: Satoshi Yaginuma
- Lyricists: Satoshi Yaginuma; Yoshino Nanjō; Yuki-ka
- Producer: Jun Nishimura

fripSide singles chronology
"Yappari Sekai wa Atashi☆Legend!!" (2008)	"Only My Railgun" (2009)	"Level 5 Judgelight" (2010)

A Certain Scientific Railgun album chronology
A Certain Scientific Railgun (2009)	A Certain Scientific Railgun OVA (2010)

"Only My Railgun" (stylized as "only my railgun") is a Japanese single by the pop and trance duo fripSide, which was released by Geneon Universal Entertainment on November 4, 2009. It is used as the first opening theme music for J.C.Staff's anime television series A Certain Scientific Railgun.

== Background ==
"Only My Railgun" is the first single by fripSide to feature Yoshino Nanjō as its new lead vocalist since her joining in August 2009. Nanjō described it as having the "electric elements" of science and "fantastic elements" of magic, while Satoshi Yaginuma felt that it was a "difficult song" with a "fast pitch and high keys". He cited his fondness of Western hard rock music when composing the song to achieve a native singing speed and rhythm with two or three syllables in every note. The tempo was revealed to have 130 beats per minute (BPM). As for the coupling song "Late in Autumn", Nanjō felt that it was "bright" enough to make its lyrics "sadder", while Yaginuma described it as the "standard song for the new fripSide".

Magician Shinji Maggy made an appearance in the "Only My Railgun" promotional video (PV). The song was included in the 2020 smartphone game D4DJ Groovy Mix on April 4, 2022.

== Track listing ==
All music is composed by Satoshi Yaginuma.

"Only My Railgun" CD track listing
No.	Title	Lyrics	Length
1.	"Only My Railgun"	Satoshi Yaginuma; Yuki-ka	4:17
2.	"Late in Autumn"	Yoshino Nanjō; Yuki-ka	6:09
3.	"Only My Railgun" (instrumental)		4:16
4.	"Late in Autumn" (instrumental)		6:06
Total length:			20:48

=== Limited edition ===
The single's limited edition is bundled with a DVD and was also released on November 4, 2009.

"Only My Railgun" DVD track listing
No.	Title	Lyrics	Length
1.	"Only My Railgun (PV)"	Yuki-ka
2.	"Making"
3.	"Spot (In Stores Now ver.)"
4.	"Spot (Special ver.)"

== Reception ==
=== Sale ===
"Only My Railgun" sold 26,000 copies in its first weekend since its release. The song has been certified Gold by the Recording Industry Association of Japan for both physical and streaming department.

=== Chart ===
Year	Chart	Peak position
2009	Japan Oricon Singles Chart (Oricon)	3

=== Accolade ===
In October 2010, "Only My Railgun" won the Radio Kansai Award at Animation Kobe Awards.

== Other versions ==
Machico did a cover version of "Only My Railgun" song, which became available on iTunes Store on December 10, 2014, as part of her second album COLORS II -RML- that was released in April 2015.

"Only My Railgun" song received a new arrangement from fripSide, which is titled "Only My Railgun Version 2020" (stylized as "only my railgun -version2020-"). It was released by NBCUniversal Entertainment Japan on April 1, 2020. The new song is included in fripSide's visual album "fripSide infinite video clips 2009–2020" that was released on Blu-ray on the same date.
