= Ren'ai CHU! =

2001 video game

- Japanese Dreamcast cover art
- Developer(s): Saga Planets
- Publisher(s): Saga Planets (Windows); GN Software (DC)
- Platform(s): Dreamcast, Windows
- Release: JP: March 23, 2001; JP: November 27, 2003 (DC)
- Genre(s): Erotic game

Ren'ai CHU! is a Japanese erotic game released by Saga Planets in 2001. A non-hentai disc of bonus extras called "Motto Love-CHU!" was released in the same year, and the Dreamcast version, Renai Chu! Happy Perfect, released by GN Software in 2003.

It is well known for its theme song, of the same name as the game. Two Para Para remix versions are contained on the fun disc, and also the original and another vocal edition exist.

== Characters ==
- Nanami Kanzaki
- Miduki Saeki
- Rei Sudo
- Karin Tsukishima
- Nonoka Tsukishima - Karin's sister
- Wakana Higuchi
- Lime Regan
- Yayoi Nishina
- Taiyou Kawasaki
- Hikaru Ijuin
