= Mao Uesugi =

Mao Uesugi 上杉 真央
- Born: December 21, 1992 (age 33); Nagoya, Japan
- Genre: Anison
- Occupation: Singer
- Years active: 2012–present
- Label: NBCUniversal Entertainment Japan
- Member of: fripSide
- Formerly of: Spoon

Mao Uesugi (上杉 真央, Uesugi Mao; born December 21, 1992) is a Japanese singer from Osaka Prefecture who is signed to NBCUniversal Entertainment Japan and is affiliated with Hive Six. After initially starting her career in 2012 following an audition held by the anime publication LisAni!, she largely worked as a doujin singer from 2018 onwards. In 2022, she became one of the two new vocalists of the vocal unit fripSide. She made her major debut as a solo artist in 2025 with the release of her first single "Zero Ignition".

== Biography ==
Uesugi was born in Nagoya on December 21, 1992, and spent her early life in Osaka Prefecture. Her music career began in 2012 when, following an audition co-organized by the anime publication LisAni! and fripSide composer Satoshi Yaginuma, she became one of three members of the music unit Spoon; the unit released one single titled "Silverlight" before ceasing activities. She studied at Doshisha University, before spending time working at Japan Post, eventually leaving her job to move to Tokyo to pursue a solo music career. During this time, she performed under the stage name mAO, being active as a doujin singer and performing at live venues in Tokyo. She also remained in contact with Yaginuma, who trained to be a future vocalist for fripSide.

In 2022, Uesugi and Hisayo Abe became fripSide's two new vocalists following the departure of its previous vocalist Yoshino Nanjō. In 2025, she made her solo debut under NBCUniversal Entertainment Japan, releasing the single "Zero Ignition" on March 5, 2025; the title was used as the opening theme to the anime television series Grisaia: Phantom Trigger.

== Discography ==
=== Singles ===
- "Zero Ignition" (March 5, 2025)
