= Shiden Kanzaki =

Japanese novelist (born 1985)

Shiden Kanzaki 神崎紫電
- Born: 1985 (age 40–41); Hokkaido Prefecture, Japan
- Occupation: Novelist
- Writing career
- Language: Japanese
- Period: 2007 –
- Genres: Light novel, mystery, suspense, gakuen novel, science fiction
- Notable works: Marginal series Black Bullet series
- Notable awards: 1st Shogakukan Light Novel Award (2007)

Shiden Kanzaki (神崎紫電, Kanzaki Shiden; born 1985) is a Japanese novelist. He is from the Hokkaido Prefecture, however currently resides in Tokyo.

== Career ==
In 2007, he debuted with the first volume of the Marginal (マージナル) series after it won the 1st Shogakukan Light Novel Awards.

In 2011, his series Black Bullet (ブラック・ブレット) began publishing. The same year, his novel Koi no Cupid wa Handgun o Buppanasu (恋のキューピッドはハンドガンをぶっ放す。) was published.

Black Bullet received an anime adaptation in 2014.

== Works ==
- Marginal (マージナル) series (Illustrated by kyo, published by Gagaga Bunko, 6 volumes, 2007 –)
- Black Bullet (ブラック・ブレット) series (Illustrated by Saki Ukai, published by Dengeki Bunko, 7 volumes, 2011 –)
- Koi no Cupid wa Handgun o Buppanasu (恋のキューピッドはハンドガンをぶっ放す。) (Illustrated by aki, published by Gagaga Bunko, 2011, ISBN 9784094512885)
