= Black Bullet =

Japanese light novel series

- Cover of the first light novel volume

ブラック・ブレット (Burakku Buretto)
- Genre: Action, post-apocalyptic
- Light novel
- Written by: Shiden Kanzaki
- Illustrated by: Saki Ukai
- Published by: ASCII Media Works
- English publisher: NA: Yen Press
- Imprint: Dengeki Bunko
- Original run: July 10, 2011 – April 10, 2014
- Volumes: 7
- Light novel

Black Bullet: New World Order
- Written by: Shiden Kanzaki
- Illustrated by: Saki Ukai
- Published by: ASCII Media Works
- Imprint: Dengeki Bunko
- Original run: November 10, 2026 – present
- Volumes: 8
- Manga
- Written by: Shiden Kanzaki
- Illustrated by: Morinohon
- Published by: ASCII Media Works
- English publisher: NA: Yen Press
- Magazine: Dengeki Maoh
- Original run: August 27, 2012 – June 27, 2014
- Volumes: 4
- Anime television series
- Directed by: Masayuki Kojima
- Produced by: Asuka Yamazaki; Fuminori Yamazaki; Mitsutoshi Ogura; Yasutaka Kurosaki
- Written by: Tatsuhiko Urahata
- Music by: Shirō Sagisu
- Studio: Kinema Citrus; Orange
- Licensed by: AUS: Hanabee; NA: Sentai Filmworks; UK: Animatsu Entertainment (former); Anime Limited (current); SA / SEA: Muse Communication
- Original network: AT-X, Tokyo MX, Sun TV, tvk, KBS, TV Aichi, BS11, TSC
- English network: SEA: Animax Asia
- Original run: April 8, 2014 – July 1, 2014
- Episodes: 13

Black Bullet (Japanese: ブラック・ブレット(黒の銃弾), Hepburn: Burakku Buretto) is a Japanese light novel series written by Shiden Kanzaki and illustrated by Saki Ukai, published under ASCII Media Works's Dengeki Bunko imprint. The story takes place during a parasitic epidemic, and follows Rentarō Satomi and Enju Aihara, two Civil Security workers who take missions to protect the Tokyo Area from destruction.

The series began publication in July 2011, and 7 volumes have been published as of April 2014. A manga series began serialization in August 2012 in ASCII Media Works's Dengeki Maoh. An anime television series adaptation animated by Kinema Citrus and Orange was broadcast from April to July 2014, and was simulcast outside Japan by Crunchyroll. The Black Bullet franchise was localized in three countries by several companies: the anime was licensed by Sentai Filmworks for North America, Animatsu Entertainment and later Anime Limited for the United Kingdom and Ireland, and Hanabee for Australia. Both the manga and light novel series are published in North America by Yen Press. In September 2026, Dengeki Bunko would announce the publication of Black Bullet: New World Order, which is a reboot that drastically expands upon and continues the plotline of the original novella series.

== Plot ==
In the year 2021, mankind is ravaged by the epidemic of Gastrea, a parasitic virus, and is forced to live within the Monolith walls, which are created from Varanium: a metal that is able to subdue Gastrea. Soon, children who were born with the Gastrea virus and obtained superhuman abilities as a result, are discovered and dubbed "Cursed Children". Due to the Gastrea virus' intervention, the Cursed Children could only be female. Civil Securities are formed to specialize fighting against Gastrea, operating with the pair of an Initiator, who are cursed children, and a Promoter, serving to lead the cursed children. Ten years after the epidemic, Rentarō Satomi, a high school student who is also a Promoter in Tendō Civil Security Agency owned by his childhood friend Kisara Tendō, along with his Initiator, Enju Aihara, conducts missions to prevent the destruction of the Tokyo Area and the world.

== Characters ==
=== Tendō Civil Security ===
Rentarō Satomi (里見 蓮太郎, Satomi Rentarō)
Voiced by: Yuki Kaji (Japanese); Chris Patton (English)
Rentarō is a second year student in Magata High School and a Promoter in Tendō Civil Security. Rentarō's parents died in the war against Gastrea ten years ago, and was adopted by the Tendō family, but left the family along with Kisara. Rentarō lost his right leg, right arm and left eye in a fight with Gastrea to protect Kisara, and was saved by Doc's "New Human Creation Plan" which replaced his lost limbs with Varanium. Due to his kind and sincere nature Rentaro is one of the few sympathizers of the cursed children. He usually goes to extreme lengths to help them. This trait also leads many cursed children to either take an interest in him or become infatuated with him. He uses an XD and is a beginner in Tendō style martial arts in the beginning of the story.
Enju Aihara (藍原 延珠, Aihara Enju)
Voiced by: Rina Hidaka (Japanese); Luci Christian (English)
Enju is a Cursed Child, and is Rentarō's Model Rabbit Initiator in Tendō Civil Security. She lives with Rentarō and goes to primary school normally until her status as a Cursed Child was revealed during the incident involving Kagetane Hiruko, and was forced to transfer to a new school. When first introduced to Rentarō by the International Initiator Supervising Organization (IISO), Enju had severe trust issues, but this has since improved through getting along with Rentarō and eventually becoming infatuated with him despite her young age. She is a fan of the Tenchuu Girls anime.
Kisara Tendō (天童 木更, Tendō Kisara)
Voiced by: Yui Horie (Japanese); Christina Kelly (English)
Kisara is the president of Tendō Civil Security. Originally from the Tendō clan, she left the family after a certain conflict along with her childhood friend Rentarō. Kisara's kidneys are barely functioning due to the trauma of witnessing her parents being eaten alive by Gastrea. Believing that her parents' deaths were connected to the Tendō family, she swore to avenge them and has been searching for the murderers. She is extremely skilled at the Tendō style of martial arts, but is unable to fight for extended periods of time due to her condition. Kisara has feelings for Rentarō, who has shown the attraction to be mutual, but their attempts to communicate their feelings towards one another are usually interrupted, most of the time by Enju. However, her obsession with exacting revenge on the Tendō clan is a source of concern for Rentarō, who fears it may one day lead to them parting ways.
Tina Sprout (ティナ・スプラウト, Tina Supurauto)
Voiced by: Tomoyo Kurosawa (Japanese); Caitlynn French (English)
Tina is a product of Ayn Rand's mechanized soldiers and his Model Owl Initiator. Tina was ordered to assassinate Seitenshi by Ayn but was instead foiled by Enju's interference and eventually defeated by Rentarō. Seitenshi gave her special treatment and only ordered to keep her under observation, and was hired by Tendō Civil Security when she was released. She later on forms a pair with Kisara, while becoming infatuated with Rentarō just like Enju, with whom she competes for his attention.

=== Tokyo Area ===
Seitenshi (聖天子, Seitenshi)
Voiced by: Aki Toyosaki (Japanese); Carli Mosier (English)
Real name unknown, Seitenshi is the ruler of Tokyo Area, one of the five largest areas in Japan after the war. She is idealistic and wishes for everyone to be able to live in harmony. Recently pushed through basic human right laws for the Cursed Children and has incited dissatisfaction from the Deprived Generation. She seems to have an interest in Rentaro though it is currently unknown if it's just an interest or something more.
Kikunojō Tendō (天童 菊之丞, Tendō Kikunojō)
Voiced by: Tamio Ōki (Japanese); John Swasey (English)
Kikunojō acts as Seitenshi's adviser and holds the greatest political power. He is Kisara's grandfather and also Rentarō's foster father. Due to his wife being killed by Gastrea 10 years ago, he is unhappy about Seitenshi implementing human rights for the Cursed Children, thus requesting the Hiruko pair to create an upheaval.
Miori Shiba (司馬 未織, Shiba Miori)
Voiced by: Ami Koshimizu (Japanese); Margaret McDonald (English)
Miori is the student council president of Magata High School and Rentarō's sponsor. She and Kisara hate each other due to the fact that both of them have a crush on Rentarō. She once tried to seduce Rentaro into helping create and then join her own civilian security, though when Kisara showed up it caused a confrontation between the two.
Kagetane Hiruko (蛭子 影胤, Hiruko Kagetane)
Voiced by: Rikiya Koyama (Japanese); Jay Hickman (English)
Kagetane was a Promoter in a Civil Security, but had his license revoked due to excessive killing. Kagetane is a product of the "New Human Creation Plan", and was requested to destroy the Tokyo Area. His pair is eventually defeated by Rentarō and Enju, but later reappear to assist them in the Third Kanto War.
Kohina Hiruko (蛭子 小比奈, Hiruko Kohina)
Voiced by: Aoi Yūki (Japanese); Krystal LaPorte (English)
Kohina is Kagetane's daughter and bloodthirsty Model Mantis Initiator.
Shōgen Ikuma (伊熊 将監, Ikuma Shōgen)
Voiced by: Hiromichi Tezuka (Japanese); Andrew Love (English)
Shōgen is a battle-crazed Promoter who dies in a fight against Kagetane Hiruko. At first glance he is uncaring to his Initiator, calling her his weapon. In the manga only, in his last moments he revealed he viewed them as the same - beings who only had meaning in battle and together they proved each other's existence.
Kayo Senju (千寿 夏世, Senju Kayo)
Voiced by: Megumi Han (Japanese); Hilary Haag (English)
Kayo is Shōgen's Model Dolphin Initiator. She has an IQ of 210 but is unsuited to front-line battles. During her mission to eliminate the Hiruko pair, she was separated from Shōgen and met Rentarō. As she protected the area from Gastrea led by the Hiruko pair's battle, the amount of Gastrea virus in her body exceeded the critical value, thus she requested Rentarō to shoot her while she was still human.
Takuto Yasuwaki (保脇 卓人, Yasuwaki Takuto)
Voiced by: Subaru Kimura (Japanese); Scott Gibbs (English)
Seitenshi's personal guard who is conceited and unhappy about Rentarō being hired as part of Seitenshi's protection squad from Tina's assassination attempts.
Kazumitsu Tendō (天童 和光, Tendō Kazumitsu)
Voiced by: Kazuyuki Okitsu (Japanese); Houston Hayes (English)
Kazumitsu is one of Kisara's four brothers who conspired against their parents, leading to their deaths. He is a politician who earned his position with money he embezzled during the construction of one of the Monoliths, by reducing the concentration of Varanium to cut costs. However, after the weakened Monolith is destroyed by a Gastrea invasion, Kisara obtains proof of his fraud and uses it to force a confrontation with her, succeeding in obtaining a confession from him before he dies by her hands.

=== Four Sages ===
Sumire Muroto (室戸 菫, Muroto Sumire)
Voiced by: Yūko Kaida (Japanese); Joanne Bonasso (English)
Sumire is one of the Four Sages and the person in charge of the "New Human Creation Plan". She is a researcher in a medical school near Magata High School, and is Rentarō's mentor. Ten years ago, she is the one who gave Rentarō the choice to live and be converted into a Mechanical Soldier. Sumire is rather caring towards Rentarō and loves to play pranks. She enjoys Rentarō's small visits to her lab.
Ayn Rand (エイン・ランド, Ein Rando)
Voiced by: Kōsuke Toriumi (Japanese); Mark X. Laskowski (English)
Ayn is one of the Four Sages, and heads the American Division of the Mechanized Soldier Plan, "NEXT". Ayn breached the agreement between the Four Sages and mechanized healthy Cursed Children, creating mechanized Initiators called "HYBRID". Ayn was the Promoter of Tina Sprout, but as Ayn does not possess combat abilities, he acts as a command tower instead.
Arthur Zanuck (アーサー･ザナック, Āsā Zanakku)
Arthur is one of the Four Sages, and heads the Australian Division of the Mechanized Soldier Plan, "Obelisk".
Albrecht Grünewald (アルブレヒト・グリューネワルト, Aruburehito Guryūnewaruto)
Albrecht is the leader of the Four Sages who assembled all of them, and heads the German Division of the Mechanized Soldier Plan.

=== Third Kanto War Troops ===
Tamaki Katagiri (片桐 玉樹, Katagiri Tamaki)
Voiced by: Yoshimasa Hosoya (Japanese); Adam Gibbs (English)
Tamaki is Civil Security's president who accepted Rentarō's request to join his support group for the Third Kanto War.
Yuzuki Katagiri (片桐 弓月, Katagiri Yuzuki)
Voiced by: Rumi Ōkubo (Japanese); Brittney Karbowski (English)
Yuzuki is Tamaki's sister and his Model Spider Initiator.
Shōma Nagisawa (薙沢 彰磨, Nagisawa Shōma)
Voiced by: Shinichiro Miki (Japanese); Mike Yager (English)
Shōma is Rentarō's longtime friend and senior in Tendō style martial arts. He joined Rentarō's support group during the war. He sacrificed himself to activate the bomb that destroyed the leader of the Gastrea Army, Aldebaran.
Midori Fuse (布施 翠, Fuse Midori)
Voiced by: Yui Ogura (Japanese); Cynthia Martinez (English)
Midori was Shōma's Model Cat Initiator. She was attacked by a Gastrea that injected her with the virus to the point of shortening her life span to a month. She later committed suicide by a self-inflicted gunshot wound to the head under a tree.
Nagamasa Gadō (我堂 長政, Gadō Nagamasa)
Voiced by: Tesshō Genda (Japanese); George Manley (English)
Nagamasa was the leader of the private security troops during the war. He disbanded Rentarō's support group when the latter's team disobeyed orders, and sent him on a suicide mission to kill the Gastrea Pleiades in lieu of capital punishment. He later died in battle.
Asaka Mibu (壬生 朝霞, Mibu Asaka)
Voiced by: Inori Minase (Japanese); Cara Duncan (English)
Asaka is Nagamasa's Initiator. Formed an impromptu pairing with Shōma as both lost their partners.
Hidehiko Gadō (我堂 英彦, Gadō Hidehiko)
Voiced by: Shinji Kawada (Japanese); Clint Bickham (English)
Hidehiko was Nagamasa's son and leader of Rentarō's division during the war. He was devoured by a Gastrea.
Kokone (心音, Kokone)
Kokone is Hidehiko's Initiator. She dies during the battle.

=== Others ===
Matsuzaki (松崎, Matsuzaki)
Voiced by: Tomomichi Nishimura (Japanese); Chris Ayres (English)
Matsuzaki is an elderly man who cares for the Cursed Children in the Outer Area of Tokyo.
Sōgen Saitake (斉武 宗玄, Saitake Sōgen)
Voiced by: Unshō Ishizuka (Japanese); Ty Mahany (English)
Sōgen is the ruler of Osaka Area, and an ambitious man who dreams of one day ruling the world.
Kihachi Suibara (水原 鬼八, Suibara Kihachi)
Kihachi is an old friend of Rentarō's.
Hotaru Kōro (紅露 火垂, Kōro Hotaru)
Hotaru is Kihachi's Model Planarian Initiator.
Yūga Mitsugi (巳継 悠河, Mitsugi Yūga)
Codenamed "Darkstalker".
Rika Kurume (久留米 リカ, Kurume Rika)
Rika is a soldier of the New World Creation Plan. Codenamed "Hummingbird".
Jūgo Katake (鹿嶽 十五, Katake Jūgo)
Codenamed "Swordtail".
Shigetoku Tadashima (多田島 茂徳, Tadashima Shigetoku)
Voiced by: Takashi Matsuyama (Japanese); Rob Mungle (English)
Atsurō Hitsuma (櫃間 篤朗, Hitsuma Atsurō)

== Media ==
=== Light novels ===
No.	Title	Original release date	English release date
1	Those Who Would Be Gods; Kami o Mezashita Mono Tachi (神を目指した者たち)	July 10, 2011; 978-4-04-870596-7	August 18, 2015; 978-0-31-630499-3
2	Against a Perfect Sniper; VS Shinsan Kibō no Sogekihei (VS神算鬼謀の狙撃兵)	October 8, 2011; 978-4-04-870820-3	December 15, 2015; 978-0-31-634489-0
3	The Destruction of the World by Fire; Honō ni yoru Sekai no Hametsu (炎による世界の破滅)	May 10, 2012; 978-4-04-886477-0	April 19, 2016; 978-0-31-634490-6
4	Vengeance is Mine; Fukushū Suru wa Ware ni Ari (復讐するは我にあり)	August 10, 2012; 978-4-04-886797-9	August 30, 2016; 978-0-316-34491-3
5	Rentaro Satomi, Fugitive; Tōbōhan, Satomi Rentarō (逃亡犯、里見蓮太郎)	July 10, 2013; 978-4-04-891761-2	December 20, 2016; 978-0-316-34492-0
6	Purgatory Strider; Rengoku no Hōkōsha (煉獄の彷徨者)	October 10, 2013; 978-4-04-866008-2	April 18, 2017; 978-0-316-34494-4
7	The Bullet That Changed the World; Sekai Henkaku no Jūdan (世界変革の銃弾)	April 10, 2014; 978-4-04-866472-1	September 19, 2017; 978-0-316-51064-6

=== Manga ===
A manga adaptation illustrated by Morinohon was serialized in ASCII Media Works' Dengeki Maoh magazine from August 27, 2012, to June 27, 2014.

No.	Original release date	Original ISBN	English release date	English ISBN
1	May 27, 2013	978-4-04-891196-2	September 22, 2015	978-0-31-634503-3
2	July 11, 2013	978-4-04-891805-3	December 15, 2015	978-0-31-634513-2
3	October 11, 2013	978-4-04-891970-8	March 22, 2016	978-0-31-634532-3
4	June 27, 2014	978-4-04-866665-7	June 28, 2016	978-0-31-627236-0

=== Anime ===
An anime television series adaptation animated by Kinema Citrus and Orange was announced at Dengeki Bunko's Autumn Festival 2013 on October 6, 2013, and premiered in April 2014. The series was picked up by Crunchyroll for online simulcast streaming in North America and other select parts of the world. The anime has been licensed by Sentai Filmworks for a digital and home video release in North America. Muse Communication licensed the anime to Southeast Asia and South Asia region

The opening theme is "black bullet" by fripSide and the ending theme is "Tokohana" (トコハナ) by Nagi Yanagi.

== Reception ==
Anime News Network had five editors review the first episode of the anime: Hope Chapman, while finding it watchable with its action scenes despite being another lazy light novel adaptation, found the female supporting cast reprehensible, singling out the portrayal of Enju Aihara as otaku bait; Bamboo Dong and Carl Kimlinger similarly praised it for being decently written and leaving enough room for story and character developments, the former saying that it might get better with later episodes while the latter criticized it for being the same as every other anime of its ilk; Rebecca Silverman said that the premise had intrigue with visuals that catch the eyes' attention but it needs to work on its pacing and story developments to reach its potential. The fifth reviewer, Theron Martin, while finding the story schematics generic and filled with otaku trappings was hopeful because of the technical aspects that complement the action scenes and the sense of intrigue throughout, concluding that "it looks like it could be an entertaining (if not necessarily original) action romp, especially if the kinks get ironed out." Kotaku's Richard Eisenbeis was negative towards the series, saying it had a good concept but was bogged down by an amalgam of genres that don't go together, follows a formulaic blueprint set by other anime series and is filled with plot holes that require a suspension of disbelief, concluding that, "In the end, I simply would not recommend Black Bullet to anyone. It's a mess of an anime." Allen Moody, writing for THEM Anime Reviews, was critical of the series' cliché harem aspects but gave praise to both Seitenshi and Enju, crediting the former's trait of being "gentle while still being strong and decisive," and the latter for her relationship with Rentaro being "emotionally deeper and more complex than a lolicon crush." Moody also gave praise to the action scenes for their mixture of both CG and traditional animation, and the "imaginatively conceived" designs of the Gastrea that occupy them.
