= A Certain Scientific Railgun season 1 =

2009 Japanese television season

A Certain Scientific Railgun
- Season 1
- First home media volume cover, featuring Kuroko Shirai (L) and Mikoto Misaka (R)
- Starring: Rina Satō; Satomi Arai; Aki Toyosaki; Kanae Itō; Atsushi Abe
- No. of episodes: 24

Release
- Original network: Tokyo MX
- Original release: October 3, 2009 – March 20, 2010

Season chronology
- Next → Season 2: S

The first season of the Japanese animated television series A Certain Scientific Railgun, based on the manga series of the same name written by Kazuma Kamachi and illustrated by Motoi Fuyukawa, follows the third Level 5 esper in Academy City named Mikoto Misaka. Produced by J.C.Staff, the season was directed by Tatsuyuki Nagai with series composition supervised by Seishi Minakami.

An anime adaptation of the manga series was announced in March 2009, with Nagai and Minakami being revealed to be part of the staff in June. That month, Rina Satō, who voiced Misaka in A Certain Magical Index (2008), was announced to be reprising the character, along with Satomi Arai as Kuroko Shirai and Atsushi Abe as Toma Kamijo. Additionally, Aki Toyosaki, and Kanae Itō joined the cast as Kazari Uiharu and Ruiko Saten, respectively.

The first season consists of 24 episodes and ran on Tokyo MX from October 3, 2009, to March 20, 2010, with other networks following days later. (Note: Tokyo MX lists the series premiere as October 2 at 26:30, which is effectively October 3 at 2:30 a.m. JST. After the first episode, the season aired an hour earlier at 25:30 (1:30 a.m. JST).) A second season was announced in October 2012.

== Episodes ==
No. overall	No. in season	Title	Directed by	Written by	Storyboarded by	Original release date
1	1	"Electromaster"; Transliteration: "Erekutoromasutā" (Japanese: 電撃使い(エレクトロマスター))	Tatsuyuki Nagai	Seishi Minakami	Tatsuyuki Nagai	October 3, 2009
In Academy City, Kuroko Shirai, a member of a public moral committee group known as Judgment, finds that her senior at Tokiwadai Middle School, Mikoto Misaka, has already dispatched some thugs that were targeted, much to Kuroko's chagrin. After physical exams at school, at which Mikoto is ranked a Level-5 esper, Kuroko invites her colleague Kazari Uiharu to meet Mikoto, and Kazari decides to brings along her friend and classmate, Ruiko Saten, as well. As the four go to a crêperie, where Kazari and Ruiko are surprised to find Mikoto nothing like the snobby socialite image that they had in mind, a bank robbery takes place nearby. Kuroko uses her teleportation ability to apprehend two robbers, but a third robber attempts to kidnap a wandering kid, hurting Ruiko when she attempts to stop him. This angers Mikoto, who uses her electromagnetic powers to fire her signature railgun attack at the robber and stop his escape. With the robbers apprehended by the Anti-Skills, the city's police and security, Ruiko is thanked by everyone for her brave rescue.
2	2	"When Working Under a Hot Sun, Rehydration Is Essential"; Transliteration: "Entenka no Sagyō ni wa Suibun Hokyū ga Hissu desu no yo" (Japanese: 炎天下の作業には水分補給が必須ですのよ)	Tamaki Nakatsu	Hiroshi Ōnogi & Seishi Minakami	Tamaki Nakatsu	October 10, 2009
Mikoto invites Kazari and Ruiko over to her dorm room to hang out, ruining Kuroko's plans of celebrating her one-month anniversary as Mikoto's roommate. Upon learning that Kuroko had ordered aphrodisiacs for the occasion, Mikoto ends up fighting her in the hallway, only for both of them to be caught using their power by the fearsome Tokiwadai Dorm Supervisor. As punishment, both are sent to clean the school pool, where Mikoto is introduced to Kuroko's classmates, Kinuho Wannai and Maaya Awatsuki. When Kinuho offers to help Mikoto clean the pool with her aquakinetic powers as thanks for rescuing her from some thugs a while back, Kuroko gets jealous of how well Mikoto gets on with others, believing that Mikoto has no use for her. To cheer her up, Mikoto gives Kuroko a present celebrating a slightly different anniversary, being the day when they became friends. However, whilst toasting, Kuroko accidentally drinks the aphrodisiac she had intended to give to Mikoto, becoming so overcome with lust that she steals Mikoto's underwear while she is still wearing them, prompting an electrical punishment.
3	3	"Tokiwadai Is Targeted"; Transliteration: "Nerawareta Tokiwadai" (Japanese: ねらわれた常盤台)	Takashi Kawabata	Kurasumi Sunayama	Tetsuya Yanagisawa (Note: Credited as Sōma Ōgami)	October 17, 2009
Kazari and Ruiko are invited by Mikoto and Kuroko to visit the School Garden, a private district of Academy City where a large number of elite girls' schools are located. On the way, Ruiko ends up getting her uniform wet and has to borrow a Tokiwadai uniform. Whilst visiting a cake shop, Kuroko and Kazari are called back to Judgment and are informed of a case where several Tokiwadai students have been tased and had exaggerated eyebrows drawn on with permanent marker. Due to the uniform Ruiko is mistaken for a Tokiwadai student and is attacked in the shop's bathroom, becoming the latest victim. Kuroko and Uiharu narrow down the suspects to a Level-2 esper named Miho Jūfuku, who can turn herself invisible to the naked eye. After Ruiko confirms this, having seen Miho's reflection in the bathroom mirror, the girls use the garden's camera system to track down and corner Miho. She reveals that her boyfriend dumped her in favor of a Tokiwadai student because of her weird eyebrows, which led her to target other Tokiwadai students. Sympathetically, Ruiko forgives Miho and compliments her eyebrows, making her happy. As Miho is taken into custody, Mikoto wonders how a Level-2 esper managed to get so powerful.
4	4	"Urban Legends"; Transliteration: "Toshi Densetsu" (Japanese: 都市伝説)	Hideki Tachibana	Miya Asakawa	Hideki Tachibana	October 24, 2009
Mikoto and the others discuss urban legends they have seen on the internet, including one about a mysterious woman who undresses in public. Of particular interest to Mikoto is one rumor concerning a boy with the ability to cancel out other abilities, reminding her of when she first met Toma Kamijo during an encounter with a group of thugs. While in town, Mikoto runs into Tōma as he tries to help a woman look for where she parked her car. When the woman suddenly starts undressing herself, Tōma runs away from the misunderstanding bystanders, leaving Mikoto to help the woman find her car, where they have some curious conversations. Later that day, Mikoto runs into Tōma again and gets him to agree to a fight near a riverbank. Despite Mikoto's creative use of her powers, she is unable to stop Tōma's ability to negate her attacks. Tōma pretends to lose after seeing Mikoto flinching, but this only serves to agitate her even more as she proceeds to chase him all night.
5	5	"A Certain Pair of New Trainees"; Transliteration: "Toaru Futari no Shinjin Kenshū" (Japanese: とある二人の新人研修)	Tomohiro Kamitani	Nobuhiko Tenkawa	Tomohiro Kamitani	October 31, 2009
Whilst out on patrol, Kuroko and Kazari come across a couple of petty thieves stealing from a car in broad daylight. However, when Kuroko charges in, the thieves ambush her and injure Kazari as they make a quick getaway. Kazari scolds Kuroko for not only ignoring her warning, but also forgetting the promise they made together. Later that day, Mikoto is told the story about how Kuroko and Kazari first met in Judgment a few years ago. When Kuroko and her senior, Mii Konori, had gotten involved in a bank robbery, Kuroko's rash actions had led to Kazari being taken hostage by one of the robbers, an esper who can throw balls at a constant speed, and had caused Konori to become injured protecting her from one of his attacks. Having realized her mistakes, Kuroko had managed to teleport Kazari outside to safety, staying behind to face the robber. In the end, Kuroko had been saved thanks to Mikoto, who anonymously answered Kazari's pleas for help, and had managed to apprehend the robber. Through telling the story, Kuroko remembers the promise she made with Kazari was to be true to themselves and become full-fledged members of Judgment together. Realizing her folly, Kuroko catches up to Kazari and joins her in pursuing the car thieves.
6	6	"Everyone Is Proactive When It Comes to This"; Transliteration: "Kō Iu Koto ni wa Minna Sekkyokuteki Nan desu yo" (Japanese: こういうことにはみんな積極的なんですよ)	Toshio Ishikawa	Mariko Kunisawa	Yūichi Nihei	November 7, 2009
When an esper starts using gravitons to cause aluminum hidden inside stuffed animals to explode all over the city, Judgment struggles to identify the culprit as the only esper whose ability is known to match the necessary level of the incidents is in a coma. Kuroko warns Mikoto not to do anything drastic like track down the culprit herself, but after Kazari leaves her Judgment armband behind, Mikoto uses the chance of being mistaken for a member of Judgment by Konori to show Kuroko that she too has what it takes to be in Judgment. However, she finds that being a Judgment member is not the exciting job she thought it was when she ends up doing a lot of menial, difficult tasks. When the pair are tasked to find a little girl's bag, Mikoto, assuming it is related to the graviton bomb case, takes drastic measures to retrieve the bag from a dog, only to discover no bomb was involved at all. Despite having her real identity exposed by Kuroko and Kazari, she is nevertheless thanked for her help, and by the end of the day, Mikoto has a new appreciation for a Judgment member's work. The next day, however, a Judgment member is injured protecting a civilian from a graviton explosion.
7	7	"Abilities and Powers"; Transliteration: "Nōryoku to Chikara" (Japanese: 能力とちから)	Kenichi Yatagai	Michiko Itō	Kenichi Yatagai	November 14, 2009
As Judgment and the Anti-Skills join forces to find the culprit behind the increasingly severe graviton bombings, Ruiko talks to Mikoto about the Level Upper, a rumored object said to increase an esper's level. The next day, Mikoto accompanies Ruiko and Kazari to the mall, where she runs into Tōma with the little girl whose bag she recovered the other day. After noticing a connection tying the graviton incidents, Kuroko and Konori realize that the culprit is targeting Judgment members, with Kazari set to be the next target. After an evacuation is mandated, Kazari, Mikoto, Tōma, and the young girl are left in the store with a graviton bomb hidden inside a stuffed animal. Mikoto fumbles her railgun trying to stop it, but everyone is saved by Tōma's right hand. Mikoto manages to find the culprit, Hatsuya Kaitabi, who wanted to punish Judgment for not protecting him from bullies, believing people with power like her and Judgment are corrupt. Mikoto punches him for using that as an excuse to hurt others, with Kuroko later telling him Mikoto would have still stood up to him even if she remained a Level-1 esper. The next day, Mikoto once again runs into Tōma, who explains why he did not seek recognition for rescuing everyone, only serving to aggravate Mikoto further.
8	8	"Level Upper"; Transliteration: "Reberu Appā" (Japanese: 幻想御手(レベルアッパー))	Makoto Sokuza	Nobuhiko Tenkawa	Masayuki Miyaji (Note: Credited as Sakomi Yajima)	November 21, 2009
After Mikoto and the others visit an ill Kazari, Kuroko becomes curious as to how Level-2 esper Hatsuya had powers equivalent to those of a Level-4 esper. When Mikoto brings up the Level Upper urban legend Ruiko had mentioned before, Kuroko points out this is not the first time an esper's power and recorded level have been vastly different. Mikoto goes to a restaurant and pretends to be an interested customer to a group of male delinquents who may have relevant information. Mikoto eventually gives up the act when they refuse to tell her, soon facing their leader, a girl named Elder Sister with the ability to manipulate the viscosity of asphalt. Mikoto wins the fight, though she does end up damaging a nearby generator in the process, causing a citywide blackout. The next day, Kuroko and Mikoto discover that Hatsuya, along with several other espers who had shown abnormally strong powers, have all fallen into comas. Meanwhile, Ruiko comes across a hidden link whilst browsing the internet on her music player, discovering a download for the Level Upper.
9	9	"Majority Report"; Transliteration: "Majoriti・Ripōto" (Japanese: マジョリティ・リポート)	Shigeyasu Yamauchi	Hiroshi Ōnogi	Shigeyasu Yamauchi	November 28, 2009
Mikoto and the others meet with AIM specialist Harumi Kiyama, the immodest woman Mikoto had previously met, about the Level Upper. Ruiko, who had downloaded the Level Upper, keeps it to herself when Kuroko mentions its relation to criminal activities. Noticing Ruiko feeling down about being a Level-0 esper, Mikoto tries to assure her that an esper's level is not important, though this secretly irritates Ruiko further. The next day, Ruiko stumbles upon a boy being conned by a group of thugs over Level Upper and, unable to just run away, decides to confront them. Coincidentally, Kuruko arrives before Ruiko gets hurt and subdues two of the thugs, but she has trouble using her teleportation powers against their boss, Trick, due to his light-distortion ability which affects her calculations. Trick chases Kuroko through an abandoned building, till Kuroko is able to teleport the building's windows directly into its supports, cutting right through them and causing the building to collapse. Having barely survived, Trick surrenders his Level Upper, which is revealed to be a music file. Meanwhile, as Ruiko feels even more conflicted about what to do with the Level Upper, she is approached by some of her classmates and, upon hearing that they are also interested in the Level Upper, decides to share it with them.
10	10	"Silent Majority"; Transliteration: "Sairento・Majoriti" (Japanese: サイレント・マジョリティ)	Daisuke Takashima	Hiroshi Ōnogi	Tsuneo Kobayashi	December 5, 2009
Ruiko uses the Level Upper on herself and her friends, becoming happy just to have an ability of her own. Meanwhile, Kuroko takes care of more Level Upper offenders and gains more injuries in the process, keeping them a secret from Mikoto. Remembering when they ate shaved ice the other day, Mikoto and Kuroko come to the conclusion that the Level Upper is using synesthesia to manipulate multiple senses via a single stimulus. Kazari hears from Ruiko that her friends had suddenly fallen unconscious due to the Level Upper, later arriving at Ruiko's apartment to find her unconscious as well. After Ruiko is admitted into the hospital, Mikoto, believing she hurt Ruiko's feelings by saying an esper's level does not matter, asks to cooperate with Judgment in finding the culprit. After learning from the frog-faced doctor, Heaven Canceller, that the Level Upper victims seem to share a brainwave pattern with someone, Mikoto and the others discover the culprit is Kiyama, who had been using the Level Upper to connect the thoughts of espers like a parallel computing network. Kazari, who had visited Kiyama earlier and discovered her notes on synesthesia, is taken hostage by her. Noticing Kuroko's injuries, Mikoto goes by herself to rescue Kazari and stop Kiyama.
11	11	"Dr. Kiyama"; Transliteration: "Kiyama-sensei" (Japanese: 木山せんせい)	Kei Umabiki	Kurasumi Sunayama	Yūichi Nihei	December 12, 2009
Kiyama explains that she used the Level Upper Network to connect many brains as an alternative supercomputer since she was not allowed to use the Tree Diagram supercomputer. She assures Kazari that the victims will be released soon and gives her a cure program. When she is roadblocked by the Anti-Skills, she harnesses the power of the Level Upper Network, called Multi-Skill, to utilize the various abilities of the victims to defeat them. Mikoto arrives and battles Kiyama, who blocks her every attack until she lets her guard down, during which Mikoto gets close enough to shock her directly. In the process, Mikoto experiences flashes of Kiyama's past, in which Kiyama had been assigned by her boss, Gensei Kihara, to be a teacher to a group of orphaned children, known as Child Errors, to prepare them for an experiment, growing fond of them in the process. However, the experiment had gone horribly wrong and the children had ended up in comas or worse, and Gensei choose to cover it up in the interests of science. Kiyama explains that she wanted to find a cure to save her students by using Tree Diagram but was denied every time, which led to her creating the Level Upper Network. As Kiyama's anger suddenly causes her to lose control of the network and fall unconscious, a strange fetus-like creature emerges from her head.
12	12	"AIM Burst"; Transliteration: "ĒMU Bāsuto" (Japanese: AIMバースト)	Hideki Tachibana	Seishi Minakami	Michio Fukuda	December 19, 2009
Mikoto attempts to fight the creature as it heads towards a nuclear power plant, but finds her attacks only cause it to regenerate and to grow larger. With the network out of control, the comatose Level Upper users start screaming in pain. Kiyama explains how the creature, called AIM Burst, is the result of the 10,000 Level Upper users' AIM fields and their negative thoughts. With the help of Anti-Skill members Aiho Yomikawa and Tsuzuri Tessō, Kazari manages to upload the cure Kiyama gave her, a song file, which is played all over the city, calming the Level Upper users and weakening AIM Burst. Despite losing its regenerative ability, AIM Burst is still able to use the abilities of the Level Upper victims, emitting their negative thoughts to Mikoto and Kiyama. Mikoto apologizes to the victims for not understanding their feelings, telling them not to give up on their dreams, and shoots a railgun to defeat AIM Burst by destroying its core. Kiyama is taking into custody by the Anti-Skills, still hoping to find a way to cure her students and challenging Mikoto to stop her again if she does not agree with her methods. Kazari rushes over to Ruiko, who, having recovered from her coma and lost her powers, apologizes to her for forgetting what was truly important.
13	13	"A Bikini Divides the Eyeline Between Top and Bottom, but a One-Piece Shows off the Figure, so They Only Flatter the Slender"; Transliteration: "Bikini wa Mesen ga Jōge ni Wakaremasu kedo Wanpīsu wa Karada no Rain ga Demasu kara Hosoi Kata Shika Niawanain desu yo" (Japanese: ビキニは目線が上下に分かれますけどワンピースは身体のラインが出ますから細い方しか似合わないんですよ)	Tomohiro Kamitani	Michiko Itō	Tamaki Nakatsu	December 26, 2009
Kinuho and Maaya ask Mikoto and Kuroko to help them be models for an online swimsuit catalog, also inviting Kazari, Ruiko, Konori and Kuroko's rival, Mitsuko Kongō. After choosing their swimsuits, the girls begin their shoot in a holographic studio that can replicate various environments down to the touch. The shoot goes well at first but the hologram system malfunctions, causing the environment to switch into weird settings, including a blizzard, a desert, a hurricane, and even the moon (with a homage to 2001: A Space Odyssey). While the camera is repaired, the girls make some curry for lunch, with Mitsuko opting to make her own curry though she has no cooking experience. After having trouble, Mitsuko finally admits it to Kinuho and Maaya who ask Konori for help, and both teams produce good curry for a photo op. After the others go home, Mikoto stays behind to try a frilly swimsuit, her first choice though the others made her feel ashamed because of its childish style, and unwittingly broadcasts her antics to the company's public billboard, which Tōma observes while passing by.
14	14	"Special Workshop"; Transliteration: "Tokubetsu Kōshū" (Japanese: 特別講習)	Takashi Kawabata	Miya Asakawa	Masayuki Miyaji	January 9, 2010
Ruiko, along with other students who had used the Level Upper, must attend a special class at a certain high school. Their first lesson, taught by the petite teacher Komoe Tsukuyomi, is about the importance of having a personal reality for ability development. During lunch, Ruiko once again encounters Miho, with whom she had been exchanging letters since their incident. Later, for their PE segment, Yomikawa has the class continuously run laps as an example of how one can surpass one's own limits. Elder Sister, the female gangster whom Mikoto fought before, complains that the classes are simply a form of punishment for using Level Upper, but Ruiko stands up to her, telling her they all deserved what they got for cheating. In their next class, Komoe explains that the special classes are not intended to be punishment, but rather lessons designed to motivate the students to try to surpass their limits and to regain the powers they once had. Komoe's speech impresses the class, including Ruiko, who remembers the kind words and advice her friends gave her and is encouraged to keep trying. After receiving a letter from Miho, who wants to follow her example, Ruiko reunites with Mikoto, Kuroko and Kazari.
15	15	"Skill Out"; Transliteration: "Sukiru Auto" (Japanese: スキルアウト)	Makoto Sokuza	Hiroshi Ōnogi	Yūichi Nihei	January 16, 2010
Mitsuko finds herself attacked by a Skill-Out gang called the Big Spiders, but is saved by a long-haired man with a spider tattoo, the description of whom Konori seems to recognize. This incident is shown to be the latest in a string of indiscriminate attacks on espers by the Big Spiders, led by one calling himself Wataru Kurozuma. Whilst investigating the gang's home turf in Academy City's 10th District, Mikoto and Kuroko come across the long-haired man who becomes their guide to the district. Mikoto and Kuroko head to the Big Spiders' hideout, but run into trouble when the gang use a sound system device called Capacity Down, which disrupts their esper abilities. The device is disabled by the long-haired man from before, who recognizes Big Spider's leader as Hebitani Tsuguo and claims himself to be the real Kurozuma. After Kurozuma singlehandedly defeats the gang, he is approached by Konori, who is revealed to be an old acquaintance of his.
16	16	"Academy City"; Transliteration: "Gakuen-toshi" (Japanese: 学園都市)	Daisuke Takashima	Hiroshi Ōnogi	Yūichi Nihei	January 23, 2010
While Konori avoids coming to work following her encounter with Kurozuma, Mikoto and the others meet up with Konori's roommate, Aomi Yanagisako. Aomi reveals that Konori was once a member of the Big Spiders, which was a friendlier group back then and, despite being an esper, she was allowed to stay by Kurozuma, with whom she fell in love. When Mikoto receives word that the Anti-Skills will be leading a surprise crackdown against the Skill-Out gangs the next day, she confronts Konori to ask why she will not leave the past behind. Konori explains that she left the gang when Kurozuma supposedly died during a fire; she later became a member of Judgment. Kurozuma explains to Konori how he was hospitalized after the fire, while she tries to convince him not to try to end the Big Spiders all by himself. Later, Mikoto has an epiphany and finally understands Konori's reasons. As the crackdown begins, Mikoto, Kuroko and Konori help Kurozuma fight the Big Spiders and destroy their weapons, including Capacity Down. With his gang members incapacitated, Hebitani threatens to light a bomb strapped on his chest, but he is knocked out by Kurozuma. As the Big Spiders are arrested by the Anti-Skills, Kurozuma asks Konori to arrest him as well, rekindling her trust and their friendship.
17	17	"Tsuzuri's Summer Vacation"; Transliteration: "Natsuyasumi no Tsuzuri" (Japanese: 夏休みのつづり)	Kei Umabiki	Kurasumi Sunayama	Masato Suma	January 30, 2010
After having a bad day, Tsuzuri does a curfew run at an arcade where she meets a boy named Haruki Kōnoe, one of Kazari and Ruiko's classmates. As Tsuzuri's Anti-Skill duties get worse, Yomikawa gives her a day off to finish her teacher work. Later that day, she encounters Kōnoe at the arcade and teaches him how to get a secret character in her favorite beat 'em up game, "Gekisho 9". While carrying a drunken Yomikawa home, Komoe gives Tsuzuri a speech about the joys of helping others, inspiring her to do better the next day. After dealing with a mischievous nun, a burger-loving miko, a small earthquake occurs while she tries to help a girl with a missing pendant. Tsuzuri then returns to the arcade, where she ends up playing against Kōnoe on Gekisho 9, both using the secret character. As the two walk home, Kōnoe becomes interested when Tsuzuri brings up the idea of another Gekisho sequel, giving his thanks to her when they part ways. Sometime afterward, Tsuzuri learns that Kōnoe has transferred to a game-design school, sponsored by Gekisho's creators, which makes her happy to know she inspired him and strengthens her resolve to do better herself.
18	18	"Asunaro Park"; Transliteration: "Asunaro-en" (Japanese: あすなろ園)	Yoshitaka Koyama	Mariko Kunisawa	Yoshitaka Koyama	February 6, 2010
After suffering the wrath of the Dorm Supervisor yet again, Kuroko seeks revenge and takes Mikoto with her to follow the Dorm Supervisor on her day off. They eventually arrive at an orphanage for Child Errors in Asunaro Park where, to their surprise, the Dorm Supervisor shows a kinder side to the children there. After spotting Kazari and Ruiko, who are helping out with their teacher Daigo, the girls realize that the Dorm Supervisor is in love with Daigo. Hoping it will change her attitude at the dorms, Kuroko offers to help her get the two of them together. The next day, the girls help mind the children while the Dorm Supervisor and Daigo make a birthday cake for one of the orphans, which fails due to her nervousness. During the party, the Dorm Supervisor protects one of the children when an earthquake kicks in, receiving praise from Daigo. The two later meet for dinner, where Daigo asks if there is anything wrong with a younger man marrying an older woman, which the girls interpret as a potential marriage proposal. However Daigo is actually planning to propose to Kazuko Shigenomori, the caretaker of the orphanage. Deciding to remain friends with Daigo and to give him her blessing, the Dorm Supervisor soon returns to her normal disciplinarian self.
19	19	"Midsummer Festival"; Transliteration: "Seika-sai" (Japanese: 盛夏祭)	Hideki Tachibana	Nobuhiko Tenkawa	Hideki Tachibana	February 13, 2010
The Tokiwadai Middle School dormitory hosts the Midsummer Festival, an invitation-only event with most of the students dressed as maids. As Kuroko gets dragged by Maika Tsuchimikado to help in the kitchen, Mikoto gives a tour of the festival to Ruiko and Kazari, the latter of whom is very excited to experience the life of a Tokiwadai student. Mikoto, however, grows anxious as news of her upcoming stage performance spreads and raises expectations. As she nervously prepares for her stage debut, Mikoto meets Tōma backstage and, believing he was simply there to make fun of her, chases him away. In the process, she manages to force out all of her worries and performs a beautiful violin solo to the crowd.
20	20	"Poltergeist"; Transliteration: "Porutāgaisuto" (Japanese: 乱雑開放(ポルターガイスト))	Masato Jinbo	Miya Asakawa	Yūichi Nihei	February 20, 2010
The episode starts off with a moderate sized night time earthquake that disrupts Mitsuko from studying. After the quake subsides, Mitsuko's teacup mysteriously falls down from her desk, along with her entire doll collection floating around. The next day, Kazari is informed by Daigo that she is getting a new roommate, a transfer student named Erii Haruue. Mikoto and Ruiko take Erii out to show her around while Kazari, Kuroko and Konori attend a meeting held by Therestina Kihara Lifeline of the Multi Active Rescue (MAR), concerning earthquake-like "Poltergeist incidents" caused by multiple espers simultaneously losing control of their abilities. That night, Mikoto and Kuroko skip out on their curfew to celebrate Erii's arrival with Ruiko and Konori at the local fireworks festival. Erii starts to reminisce about her past with her new friends, falling into a trance and wandering off on her own. Kuroko gets a call from Konori, who has discovered the Poltergeist incidents have been created on purpose, but another Poltergeist incident occurs near Kazari and Erii, who are saved from a falling lamppost by Therestina. As the girls slowly realize what has happened, a familiar woman is seen in the crowd below.
21	21	"Voices"; Transliteration: "Koe" (Japanese: 声)	Tomohiro Kamitani	Seishi Minakami	Tomohiro Kamitani	February 27, 2010
Following the Poltergeist incident, Mikoto wonders if Kiyama is once again involved, though Kuroko reminds her that Kiyama is supposedly still in custody. Kuroko instead suspects Erii as the cause, since most of the Poltergeist attacks have been occurring at places she has been. Both of them do a clandestine background check on Erii and learn that, despite being a Level-2 telepathic esper, she can exhibit Level-4 powers under certain catalysts. Kazari takes Erii to the park, where Erii explains that she had been looking for a childhood friend. Erii goes into another trance, and a violent Poltergeist attack occurs at the park. Kazari becomes angry at Kuroko for suspecting Erii, so Therestina performs some tests on Erii at the MAR Base Research Laboratory to prove her innocence. Upon waking up, Erii explains to everyone that she falls into a trance upon hearing the voice of her friend, Banri Edasaki, who apparently is another telepath. When Erii shows everyone a photo of Banri inside her pendant, Mikoto recognizes Banri as one of Kiyama's Child Error students who went into a coma.
22	22	"Level 6 (The One Who Obtains the Power of God Whilst Still Possessing a Mortal Body)"; Transliteration: "Reberu Shikkusu (Kami Naranu Mi ni te Tenjō no Ishi ni Tadoritsuku Mono)" (Japanese: レベル6(神ならぬ身にて天上の意志に辿り着くもの))	Ken'ichi Kasai	Kurasumi Sunayama	Masato Suma & Yūichi Nihei	March 6, 2010
Erii explains that both she and Banri were both telepaths who had grown up in an orphanage for Child Errors before Banri had moved, but she has recently begun hearing Banri suffering and has been trying to find her ever since. Mikoto explains about the Level Upper experiment to Therestina, who theorizes that Kiyama's comatose students are the cause of the Poltergeist incidents. However, this theory divides Kazari and Kuroko even more, as Kazari thinks Kuroko is now blaming them instead. The next day, Mikoto learns that Kiyama has been released from custody, later learning that the Poltergeists could potentially destroy Academy City if not resolved. Whilst investigating one of Gensei's old facilities, Mikoto encounters Kiyama herself, who shows her to a hospital where all of her comatose students are under the care of Heaven Canceller. He explains Gensei's conviction that an esper can become a Level 6 by taking Ability Crystals made from the essence of comatose espers who have lost control of their AIM fields. He has gathered the Child Errors and bailed Kiyama to find a cure, but without the "First Sample", the first test subject of Gensei's Ability Crystal program, their attempts at waking the students have caused Poltergeist incidents. Therestina, who followed Mikoto and Kiyama to their location, arrives and demands the children to her custody. Forced to choose, Mikoto takes Therestina's side to potentially give the children a chance, convincing the heartbroken Kiyama to put her trust in the authorities.
23	23	"What Is It You See in Your Eyes Right Now?"; Transliteration: "Ima, Anata no Me ni wa Nani ga Mietemasu ka?" (Japanese: いま、あなたの目には何が見えてますか?)	Daisuke Takashima	Miya Asakawa	Naoto Hosoda	March 13, 2010
Still feeling concerned, Kazari goes to see Kiyama and convinces her to share information with MAR to help her students. However, Therestina destroys Kiyama's data and refuses to let them see either Erii or the children. When Kazari tells her friends what happened, they learn that Therestina is in fact Gensei's granddaughter, who was the first test subject of his Ability Crystal program. Realizing she was tricked, Mikoto confronts a battle-suited Therestina at the MAR Base Research Laboratory, but is outmatched when Therestina uses Capacity Down on her, revealing she intends to finish Gensei's work. As Therestina and MAR leave with Erii and the children, Mikoto is rescued by Mitsuko, who had been resting nearby following a previous Poltergeist incident. When Mikoto awakens, she blames herself and attempts to go off on her own again. However, Ruiko stands in her way, reminding Mikoto that she does not have to do everything by herself and getting Kazari and Kuroko to make up with each other. Learning Kiyama is chasing after the MAR trailers to their destination, Mikoto, Kuroko, Kazari, Ruiko, Konori and Mitsuko head out to save Erii and the others.
24	24	"Dear My Friends"	Tatsuyuki Nagai	Seishi Minakami	Tatsuyuki Nagai	March 20, 2010
Kiyama is after the MAR trailers, unaware they are decoys filled with the MAR Troops, but is saved by Mikoto. Kuroko, Mitsuko, Yomikawa, Tsuzuri and the Anti-Skills hold off the rest of the MAR Troops. Kiyama, Kazari and Ruiko head towards Kihara's laboratory, whilst Mikoto defends them from Therestina, who attacks with a giant large mech. Although Therestina's mech is unaffected by Mikoto's basic attacks, Kuroko helps Mikoto destroy the mech by using its own arm as an improvised railgun. Mikoto, Kuroko, Kazari, Ruiko and Kiyama finally arrive at the underground lab where Erii and the children are being held. However, Therestina, who had survived, suddenly activates the lab's Capacity Down and attacks the weakened espers, revealing her plan to use the First Sample from herself and the children to force Erii to become a Level 6 esper, destroying the city in the process. As all hope seems lost, Ruiko, the only one not affected by Capacity Down, destroys its controls, allowing Mikoto to defeat Therestina with her railgun. With the First Sample in hand, Kiyama creates the cure and finally awakens Banri and the other children, giving her thanks to Mikoto. In the aftermath, the recovering children give a birthday message to Kiyama via a blimp as Mikoto and her friends watch.

== Production ==
=== Development and writing ===
In March 2009, a flyer announced the anime television series adaptation of Motoi Fuyukawa's manga series A Certain Scientific Railgun. The final episode's ending of A Certain Magical Index (2008) confirmed that the series was greenlit. In June 2009, Tatsuyuki Nagai joined the staff at J.C.Staff as the director, along with Seishi Minakami as the series composition writer and Yuichi Tanaka as the character animation designer. Rina Satō, the voice of Mikoto Misaka, revealed that the series would explore her character's daily life and her interaction with other characters aside Toma Kamijo, the main character of A Certain Magical Index franchise. The series would also explore the science side since Index mainly focused on the magic side. With the Railgun series, Satomi Arai, the voice of Kuroko Shirai, hoped that her character and Misaka would have more interaction than what they had in Index.

=== Casting ===
In June 2009, Satō, Arai, and Atsushi Abe were confirmed to be reprising their respective roles from A Certain Magical Index as Misaka, Shirai, and Kamijo, along with Aki Toyosaki as Kazari Uiharu and Kanae Itō as Ruiko Saten.

=== Music ===
Maiko Iuchi was revealed to be composing the series in August 2009, after previously doing so for A Certain Magical Index (2008). For the first fourteen episodes, the opening theme music is "Only My Railgun" by fripSide, while the ending theme music is "Dear My Friend -Mada Minu Mirai e-" (Dear My Friend －まだ見ぬ未来へ－, Dear My Friend -Towards an Unseen Future-) by Elisa. A special ending theme music, titled "Smile: You & Me" by Elisa, was aired on episode 12. From episodes 15 onwards, the opening theme music is "Level 5 Judgelight" by fripSide, while the ending theme music is "Real Force" by Elisa.

== Marketing ==
In August 2009, the official website of A Certain Scientific Railgun was launched, and a promotional video for the series was released. Satō, Arai, Toyosaki, and Itō attended a stage event at Dengeki Character Festival 2009 in October to promote the series.

== Release ==
=== Broadcast ===
A Certain Scientific Railgun began airing in Japan on Tokyo MX on October 3, 2009, on TVS, CTC, MBS, and tvk on October 4, on AT-X on October 5, and on CBC on October 8. The season was also broadcast on Funimation Channel in the United States in 2013.

=== Home media ===
Japanese Blu-ray & DVD release
Vol.	Episodes	Release date	Ref.
1	1–3	January 29, 2010	
2	4–6	February 26, 2010	
3	7–9	March 26, 2010	
4	10–12	April 28, 2010	
5	13–15	May 28, 2010	
6	16–18	June 25, 2010	
7	19–21	July 30, 2010	
8	22–24	August 27, 2010	

Geneon Universal Entertainment released eight Blu-ray and DVD volumes of the series in Japan starting January 29, 2010. Each volume contains a bonus novel written by Kazuma Kamachi titled A Certain Magical Index SS: Kaori Kanzaki, which follows one of the most powerful Saint named Kaori Kanzaki. The fifth volume is bundled with an episode of the bonus anime Much More Railgun.

In December 2016, Crunchyroll added the series to their catalog. Hulu released the series in Japan on March 24, 2022, while Muse Asia began streaming it on their official YouTube channel on May 13.

== Reception ==
=== Critical response ===
Theron Martin of Anime News Network gave a 'B' rating to A Certain Scientific Railgun, feeling that it was a "fun and engaging series that effectively mixes comedy, action, and some more serious elements and can stand plenty well on its own". He lauded the core cast's dynamics and chemistry, and praised the lack of "preachiness", which he claimed was the "biggest downfall" of A Certain Magical Index . Ian Wolf of Anime UK News gave the series 8 out of 10, finding it "funnier" than Index. Despite praising the creative team for getting the right balance of humor, he criticized the music as being "not that exciting", characterized plots as "a bit badly written", and described the show's central villain as "stereotypically evil rather than anything more subtle".

=== Accolade ===
Satomi Arai was nominated for Best Actress in Supporting Roles at the 5th Seiyu Awards for her role as Kuroko Shirai.
