= Level 5: Judgelight =

Single by fripSide
- Language: Japanese
- B-side: "Memory of Snow"
- Released: February 17, 2010
- Genre: J-pop
- Length: 18:50
- Label: Geneon Universal
- Composer: Satoshi Yaginuma
- Lyricists: fripSide; Satoshi Yaginuma; Yuki-ka
- Producer: Jun Nishimura

fripSide singles chronology
"Only My Railgun" (2009)	"Level 5: Judgelight" (2010)	"Future Gazer" (2010)

A Certain Scientific Railgun album chronology
A Certain Scientific Railgun (2009)	A Certain Scientific Railgun OVA (2010)

"Level 5: Judgelight" (stylized as "LEVEL5 -judgelight-") is a Japanese single by the pop and trance duo fripSide, which was released by Geneon Universal Entertainment on February 17, 2010. The track serves as the second opening theme music for J.C.Staff's anime television series A Certain Scientific Railgun.

== Background ==
"Level 5: Judgelight" is the first single for which fripSide was credited as a group for its lyrics. The title, coined by Satoshi Yaginuma, combines the words "judgement" and the "light" emitted by Mikoto Misaka's Railgun ability. Yaginuma described it as representing the "light of justice that gathers around Mikoto as a collective of longing, trust, and bond".

== Track listing ==
All music is composed by Satoshi Yaginuma.

"Level 5: Judgelight" CD track listing
No.	Title	Lyrics	Length
1.	"Level 5: Judgelight"	fripSide	4:25
2.	"Memory of Snow"	Satoshi Yaginuma; Yuki-ka	5:02
3.	"Level 5: Judgelight" (instrumental)		4:25
4.	"Memory of Snow" (instrumental)		4:58
Total length:			18:50

=== Limited edition ===
The single's limited edition is bundled with a DVD and was also released on February 17, 2010.

"Level 5: Judgelight" DVD track listing
No.	Title	Length
1.	"Level 5 Judgelight (PV)"
2.	"Making"
3.	"Spot (In Stores Now ver.)"
4.	"Spot (Special ver.)"

== Chart ==
Year	Chart	Peak position
2010	Japan Oricon Singles Chart (Oricon)	4
