= Saga Planets =

Japanese video game company

- Company type: Independent Visual Novel Brand
- Industry: Computer games
- Genre: Eroge & Visual novels
- Founded: Osaka, Japan (1998)
- Headquarters: Kita, Osaka, Japan
- Area served: Japan
- Key people: Furu (spokesperson)
- Website: sagaplanets.product.co.jp

Saga Planets (サガプラネッツ, Saga Puranettsu) (often stylized as SAGA PLANETS), is a Japanese adult visual novel brand and a formerly subsidiary of Visual Arts. Their debut title, Mukuro ~Mesu o Nerau Agito~, was released in 1998 and their most recent work, AMBITIOUS MISSION, was released in 2022. Among Saga Planets' most notable releases is the Four Seasons Series (四季シリーズ, Shiki Shirīzu): Coming x Humming!! (representing spring), Natsuyume Nagisa (representing summer), Kisaragi Gold ★ Star (representing autumn), and Hatsuyuki Sakura (representing winter).

== Releases ==
Title	Release date	Ref
Mukuro ~Mesu o Nerau Agito~	February 27, 1998	
Marionette -Kugutsu-	April 30, 1999	
Tsumi no Batsu	October 1, 1999	
Pure Heart ~Sekai de Ichiban Anata ga Suki~	July 28, 2000	
Ren'ai Chu! ~Kanojo no Himitsu wa Otoko no Ko?~	March 23, 2001	
Motto Love Chu! ~Ren'ai Chu! Fandisk~	August 31, 2001	
Oni Isha	April 26, 2002	
Mugyu~tto! Pet Maid	April 25, 2003	
Haa Haa Telepath ~Hajimete na no ni Chou Binkan~	January 30, 2004	
Usotsuki wa Tenshi no Hajimari	March 25, 2005	
Fushigi no Kuni no Kanojo	March 6, 2006	
Kou Ki	April 3, 2006	
Seien Tenshi Eleanor	June 29, 2007	
Coming x Humming!!	June 27, 2008	
Binkan Joshikousei, Tsukushitai no!	December 19, 2008	
Natsuyume Nagisa	July 31, 2009	
Kisaragi Gold ★ Star	October 29, 2010	
Hatsuyuki Sakura	February 24, 2012	
Karumaruka ＊ Circle	September 27, 2013	
Hanasaki Work Spring!	March 27, 2015	
Floral Flowlove	July 29, 2016	
Kin'iro Loveriche	December 22, 2017	
Kin'iro Loveriche -Golden Time-	February 22, 2019	
Kakenuke★Seishun Sparking!	August 28, 2020	
AMBITIOUS MISSION	May 27, 2022	

== Awards ==
- Natsuyume Nagisa
  - 2009 Getchu Bishoujo Game Awards
    - 12th place: Overall
    - 8th place: Scenario
- Kisaragi Gold ★ Star
  - 2010 Getchu Bishoujo Game Awards
    - 15th place: Overall
    - 7th place: Music
    - 12th place: Opening Movie
    - 12th place: Character (Haotone Tsubasa)
- Hatsuyuki Sakura
  - 2012 Getchu Bishoujo Game Awards
    - 1st place: Overall
    - 1st place: Scenario
    - 1st place: Music
    - 2nd place: Character (Tamaki Sakura)
    - 7th place: Character (Kozaki Aya)
    - 7th place: Opening Movie
    - 11th place: Art
    - 20th place: Game Engine
- Karumaruka ＊ Circle
  - 2013 Getchu Bishoujo Game Awards
    - 17th place: Overall
    - 9th place: Art
    - 18th place: Character (Asahina Shin)
- Hanasaki Work Spring!
  - 2015 Getchu Bishoujo Game Awards
    - 9th place: Overall
    - 8th place: Art
    - 2nd place: Music
    - 7th place: Opening Movie
    - 3rd place: Character (Hanasaki Nonoka)
    - 6th place: Character (Shiranui Inori)
    - 8th place: Character (Kuon Ayano)
    - 11th place: Character (Soramori Wakaba)
  - 2015 Moe Game Awards
    - 3rd place: Overall
    - Best Theme Song
