= Hatsuyuki Sakura =

2012 video game

- Cover art

はつゆきさくら
- Genre: Romance, Fantasy
- Video game
- Developer: Saga Planets
- Publisher: Saga Planets & Visual Art's, Entergram, Inc. (Vita)
- Genre: Visual novel, eroge
- Platform: Microsoft Windows
- Released: February 24, 2012 (Windows), March 23, 2017 (Vita)
- Manga
- Written by: Daisuke Takino
- Published by: Kadokawa Shoten
- Magazine: Comp Ace
- Original run: January 2012 – May 26, 2012
- Volumes: 2

Hatsuyuki Sakura (Japanese: はつゆきさくら), also known as Hatsuyuki Sakura: White Graduation, is a Japanese adult visual novel developed and published by Saga Planets under Visual Art's. It was released on February 24, 2012. A PlayStation Vita port has been released on March 23, 2017, by Entergram, Inc. NekoNyan released an English release on PC.

A manga adaptation was serialized on Comp Ace. The first volume was released on May 25, 2012; volume 2 was released on October 25, 2012. The manga was written and illustrated by Daisuke Takino.

== Plot ==
Hatsuyuki Kawano is a third-year student, one of the rare delinquents at his school. He reluctantly shows up in order to fulfill his graduation requirements. As the first snow of the year falls in December, Hatsuyuki encounters a beautiful girl wearing a white dress in the old town. She is wandering the streets in search of a rabbit. A few days later, the girl in the dress, Sakura, transfers into his school to take Hatsuyuki along towards the last winter.

== Characters ==
=== Main characters ===
Hatsuyuki Kawano (河野 初雪, Kawano Hatsuyuki)
Voiced by: none
The protagonist of the story and is a third-year student of Shirasaki Academy (白咲学園, Shirasaki Gakuen).

Sakura Tamaki (玉樹 桜, Tamaki Sakura)
Voiced by: Minto Yamaha (Ai Shimizu)
Sakura Tamaki is a mysterious girl Hatsuyuki meets in the ruined old town, while she is searching for her bunny Nemu. She is somewhat weird and likes to use Nemu for BUNNY impersonations, which include things like the simple bunny, bunny-copter, old man’s beard, muffler, etc. She is strangely attracted to Hatsuyuki and has the habit of holding his hands whenever they are together, saying that his hands feel good. Highly allergic to adult themes in conversation, she is prone to scream "pyaa pyaa" and escape the scene whenever she hears it. She attends the same class as Hatsuyuki and seems to be a normal genki girl who gets along with everyone.

Aya Kozakai (小坂井 綾, Kozakai Aya)
Voiced by: Fūri Samoto (Michiru Yuimoto)
Aya Kozakai is Hatsuyuki’s senior by one year. She works with him at a café filled with dolls, while waiting to get into college after failing the college entrance exam. She used to be the student council president and was the perfect student everyone looked up to but did not dare to get close to. No one knows what she is thinking, but she has a curious familiarity with Hatsuyuki despite having already graduated and supposedly never spending time with him before working at the café.

Yoru Azuma (あずま 夜, Azuma Yoru)
Voiced by: Hana Kiritani (Atsumi Tanezaki)
Yoru Azuma is Hatsuyuki’s junior by one year and an expert ice skater who practices on the skating rinks every day after school. She is so good at it that she once had a shot at competing in the world championship but blew it in the preliminary matches. She is quite popular in school and the most level-headed of the bunch, often stopping Sakura and Nozomu from doing stupid things and providing valuable tsukkomi that only such a level-headed person could muster.

Nozomu Shinonome (東雲 希, Shinonome Nozomu)
Voiced by: Mitsu Anzu (Mai Kadowaki)
Nozomu Shinonome is Hatsuyuki’s junior by two years and the leader of the committee who guides students on their futures. Having grown up around her older brother Sai’s guy friends, she looks up to Hatsuyuki like a hero and speaks like a boy to forge a “manly” relationship with him. She is kind of air-headed and easily manipulated by Hatsuyuki, though genuinely helpful to anyone who asks for her advice.

Shirokuma (シロクマ; "white bear")
Voiced by: Sui Suzumiya (Motomi Nanaho)
Shirokuma is a mysterious loli who claims to have come from Russia despite obviously not being Russian. Everyone calls her Shirokuma, though that is not her real name. She is highly dependent on other people, like a princess shut in her home surrounded by servants. Her real name is Takara Mochizuki (望月 宝, Mochizuki Takara).

=== Secondary characters ===
Ran (ラン)
Voiced by: Kotomi Nanahara (Kaori Suzumoto)
Ran is Hatsuyuki’s caretaker and guardian, having taken care of him for as long as he can remember. It is an incident involving Ran that propels Hatsuyuki to complete his mission before spring comes.

Sakuya (サクヤ, Sakuya)
Voiced by: Iria Hoshizaki (Airi Sakuno)

Naoko Takeda (竹田 直子, Takeda Naoko)
Voiced by: Yuina (Mei Kojima)

Megumi Kanezaki (金崎 恵, Kanezaki Megumi)
Voiced by: Aoi Kisaragi (Airi Yoshida)

Miki Kurusu (来栖 三木, Kurusu Miki)
Voiced by: Michi Tanaka

Shizuka Miyatou (宮棟 閑, Miyatō Shizuka)
Voiced by: Mitsuki (Keiko Kobayashi)

Tamotsu Kubo (久保 完, Kubo Tamotsu)
Voiced by: Miku Nishino (Yoriko Nagata)

Sai Shinonome (東雲 妻, Shinonome Sai)
Voiced by: Shinichi Chanama

Miku Fujieda (藤枝 ミク, Fujieda Miku)
Voiced by: none

Tooru Muroya (室屋 透, Muroya Tōru)
Voiced by: Takezo Koike (Hideki Ogihara)

Akira Kozakai (小坂井 アキラ, Kozakai Akira)
Voiced by: Chisato Suzumori (Keiko Suzuki)

Nemu (ネム)
Voiced by: none

== Reception ==
In Getchu.com, Hatsuyuki Sakura was the 3rd best selling game the month of its release and 29th best selling game in March. The game was also Getchu's 7th best selling game for the first half of 2012 and 10th best selling games for 2012.

In Getchu.com's 2012 Bishoujo Game Awards (based on user votes), Hatsuyuki Sakura took first place overall, winning first place in the Scenario and Music Categories, 7th in the Movies category, 11th in Graphics, and 20th in the System category.
